= 2026 LA Galaxy season =

American soccer club season

LA Galaxy
2026 season
- General manager: Will Kuntz
- Head coach: Greg Vanney
- Stadium: Dignity Health Sports Park
- MLS: Conference: 11th Overall: 20th
- MLS Cup playoffs: Did not qualify
- CONCACAF Champions Cup: Quarter-finals
- Top goalscorer: League: João Klauss (10); All: João Klauss (11)
- Highest home attendance: 25,025
- Lowest home attendance: 15,435
- Average home league attendance: 19,452
- Biggest win: LA 4–1 Austin FC (regular season)
- Biggest defeat: St. Louis City SC 6–2 LA (regular season)
Home colors	Away colors

The 2026 season was the 31st season for the LA Galaxy, a team in Major League Soccer (MLS), the top tier of the American soccer pyramid. The Galaxy played their home matches at Dignity Health Sports Park in the Los Angeles suburb of Carson, California, and were coached by Greg Vanney in his sixth season as the head coach. The team opened the season on February 22, 2026, at home to a 1–1 draw to New York City FC and ended the season on November 7, 2026, on the road against Real Salt Lake.

In addition to competing in MLS, the club played in the CONCACAF Champions Cup, attempting to win their first Champions Cup title since the 2000 edition.

== Management team ==
Position	Name
Owner	(United States) Philip Anschutz
President and CEO	(United States) Dan Beckerman
General Manager	(United States) Will Kuntz
Technical Director	(Denmark) Mikkel Dencher
Head coach	(United States) Greg Vanney
Assistant coach	(United States) Dan Calichman
Assistant coach	(United States) Nick Theslof
Assistant coach	(Canada) Jason Bent
Goalkeeping Coach	(United States) Kevin Hartman

== Squad information ==
As of August 17, 2026

Note: Flags indicate national team as defined under FIFA eligibility rules; some limited exceptions apply. Players may hold more than one non-FIFA nationality.

No.	Pos.	Nation	Player
1	GK	SRB	Novak Mićović
2	DF	BRA	Lucas Calegari
3	DF	ARG	Julián Aude
4	DF	JPN	Maya Yoshida (captain)
5	DF	NOR	Jakob Glesnes
6	DF	ESP	Sergi Roberto
7	FW	JPN	Kyōgo Furuhashi
8	MF	URU	Lucas Sanabria
10	MF	ESP	Riqui Puig (DP)
11	FW	MEX	Hirving Lozano (DP; on loan from San Diego FC)
12	GK	USA	JT Marcinkowski
14	DF	USA	John Nelson
15	MF	USA	Justin Haak
16	MF	USA	Isaiah Parente

No.	Pos.	Nation	Player
17	MF	ARG	Pablo Ruiz
18	FW	GER	Marco Reus
20	DF	USA	Chris Rindov
21	FW	FIN	Robert Taylor
22	MF	USA	Elijah Wynder
25	DF	COL	Carlos Garcés
26	DF	USA	Harbor Miller
27	MF	GER	Erik Thommy
28	FW	GHA	Joseph Paintsil (DP)
31	GK	USA	Brady Scott
50	DF	USA	Riley Dalgado
76	FW	USA	Troy Elgersma
99	FW	BRA	João Klauss (DP)

=== On loan ===
Note: Flags indicate national team as defined under FIFA eligibility rules; some limited exceptions apply. Players may hold more than one non-FIFA nationality.

No.	Pos.	Nation	Player
24	FW	USA	Ruben Ramos (on loan to Sporting Kansas City)
30	MF	CRC	Gino Vivi (on loan to Tampa Bay Rowdies)

No.	Pos.	Nation	Player
51	DF	CMR	Ascel Essengue (on loan to Phoenix Rising)
—	FW	USA	Tucker Lepley (on loan to Oakland Roots)

=== Transfers ===
==== Transfers in ====
Pos.	Player	Transferred from	Fee/notes	Date
DF	(United States) Riley Dalgado	(United States) Ventura County FC	Homegrown player	November 12, 2025
DF	(Norway) Jakob Glesnes	(United States) Philadelphia Union	Trade	December 15, 2025
DF	(United States) Jamir Johnson	(United States) Philadelphia Union	Trade	December 15, 2025
MF	(United States) Justin Haak	(United States) New York City FC	Free	December 29, 2025
FW	(Brazil) João Klauss	(United States) St. Louis City SC	Trade	January 27, 2026
MF	(Germany) Erik Thommy	(United States) Sporting Kansas City	Free	January 28, 2026
FW	(Finland) Robert Taylor	(United States) Austin FC	Free	July 15, 2026
FW	(Japan) Kyōgo Furuhashi	(England) Birmingham City	Transfer	July 21, 2026
FW	(Mexico) Hirving Lozano	(United States) San Diego FC	Loan	August 7, 2026
MF	(Spain) Sergi Roberto	(Italy) Como	Free	August 8, 2026
DF	(Brazil) Lucas Calegari	(Turkey) Eyüpspor	Transfer	September 3, 2026
MF	(Argentina) Pablo Ruiz	(United States) Real Salt Lake	Trade	September 3, 2026

==== Transfers out ====
Pos.	Player	Transferred to	Fee/notes	Date
FW	(Spain) Miguel Berry	(United States) Charleston Battery	Free	January 27, 2026
MF	(Costa Rica) Gino Vivi	(United States) Tampa Bay Rowdies	Loan	February 13, 2026
FW	(United States) Christian Ramirez	(United States) Austin FC	Waivers	February 27, 2026
MF	(Uruguay) Diego Fagúndez	(United States) New England Revolution	Free	March 13, 2026
DF	(United States) Mauricio Cuevas	(Mexico) Santos Laguna	Transfer	July 1, 2026
MF	(Brazil) Gabriel Pec	(Brazil) Cruzeiro	Transfer	July 7, 2026
MF	(United States) Edwin Cerrillo	(Mexico) Club América	Transfer	August 8, 2026
DF	(Japan) Miki Yamane	(Japan) Urawa Red Diamonds	Transfer	August 16, 2026
MF	(United States) Ruben Ramos Jr	(United States) Sporting Kansas City	Loan	September 3, 2026
DF	(Cameroon) Ascel Essengue	(United States) Phoenix Rising	Loan	September 4, 2026

== Draft picks ==
=== MLS Re-Entry Draft picks ===
2025 LA Galaxy Re-Entry Picks
Round	Selection	Player	Position	Team	Notes
1 (Stage 1)	5	PASS	PASS	PASS	PASS
2 (Stage 2)	5	PASS	PASS	PASS	PASS

=== MLS SuperDraft picks ===
Draft picks are not automatically signed to the team roster. Only those who are signed to a contract will be listed as transfers in.

2026 LA Galaxy SuperDraft Picks
Round	Pick	Player	Position	College	Conference

== Non-competitive matches ==
=== Preseason ===
January 23 Closed-Door Scrimmage	LA Galaxy	1–0	Portland Timbers	Carson, California
11:00 AM PST	Parente			Stadium: Dignity Health Sports Park; Attendance: 0 Referee: NA

January 31 Closed-Door Scrimmage	LA Galaxy	4–1	D.C. United	Carson, California
11:00 AM PST	Reus; Nascimento; Aude; Sanabria		Clark	Stadium: Dignity Health Sports Park; Attendance: 0

February 4 Closed-Door Scrimmage	LA Galaxy	2–0	Orange County SC	Carson, California
11:00 AM PST				Stadium: Dignity Health Sports Park; Attendance: 0

February 8 Coachella Valley Invitational	LA Galaxy	2–3	Chicago Fire FC	Indio, California
10:00 AM PST	Pec 51', 77'	Report	Cuypers 29'; Zinckernagel 38'; Mueller 84'	Stadium: Empire Polo Club

February 11 Coachella Valley Invitational	LA Galaxy	3–0	St. Louis City SC	Indio, California
11:00 AM PST	Ramos Jr 54'; Nascimento 59'; Pec 90'	Report		Stadium: Empire Polo Club

February 13 Coachella Valley Invitational; Closed-Door Scrimage	LA Galaxy	v	Real Salt Lake	Indio, California
11:00 AM PST				Stadium: Empire Polo Club; Attendance: 0

== Competitions ==
=== Overview ===
Competition	First match	Last match	Starting round	Final position	Record							
Competition	First match	Last match	Starting round	Final position	Pld	W	D	L	GF	GA	GD	Win %
Major League Soccer	February 22, 2026	November 7, 2026	Matchday 1	11th	34	11	11	12	50	57	−7	32.35
CONCACAF Champions Cup	February 19	April 15	Round One	Quarterfinals	6	2	2	2	9	7	+2	33.33
Total					40	13	13	14	59	64	−5	32.50

Last updated: November 7, 2026
Source: Competitions

Win Draw Loss

All matches are in Pacific Time

=== Major League Soccer (MLS) ===
==== Standings ====
MLS Western Conference table (2026)
Pos	Team	Pld	W	L	T	GF	GA	GD	Pts	Qualification
9	Real Salt Lake	34	13	15	6	53	52	+1	45	Qualification for the wild card round
10	Minnesota United FC	34	11	12	11	56	58	−2	44	
11	LA Galaxy	34	11	12	11	50	57	−7	44	
12	Colorado Rapids	34	12	15	7	47	50	−3	43	
13	San Diego FC	34	9	14	11	57	63	−6	38	

Source: MLS
Rules for classification: 1) points; 2) total wins; 3) total goal differential; 4) total goals scored; 5) fewer disciplinary points; 6) away goal differential; 7) away goals scored; 8) home goals differential; 9) home goals scored; 10) coin toss (2 clubs tied) or drawing of lots (≥3 clubs tied)

Overall MLS standings table
Pos	Team	Pld	W	L	T	GF	GA	GD	Pts
18	Real Salt Lake	34	13	15	6	53	52	+1	45
19	Minnesota United FC	34	11	12	11	56	58	−2	44
20	LA Galaxy	34	11	12	11	50	57	−7	44
21	Colorado Rapids	34	12	15	7	47	50	−3	43
22	New York Red Bulls	34	12	16	6	48	62	−14	42

Source: MLS
Rules for classification: 1) points; 2) total wins; 3) total goal differential; 4) total goals scored; 5) fewer disciplinary points; 6) away goal differential; 7) away goals scored; 8) home goals differential; 9) home goals scored; 10) coin toss (2 clubs tied) or drawing of lots (≥3 clubs tied)

=== Results summary ===
Overall								Home						Away					
Pld	Pts	W	L	T	GF	GA	GD	W	L	T	GF	GA	GD	W	L	T	GF	GA	GD
34	44	11	12	11	51	56	−5	7	4	6	26	21	+5	4	8	5	25	35	−10

Last updated: November 7, 2026
Source: MLS Results
Pld = Matches played; Pts = Points; W = Matches won; T = Matches tied; L = Matches lost; GF = Goals for; GA = Goals against; GD = Goal difference

==== Results by round ====
Round	1	2	3	4	5	6	7	8	9	10	11	12	13	14	15	16	17	18	19	20	21	22	23	24	25	26	27	28	29	30	31	32	33	34
Stadium	H	H	A	H	A	H	A	A	A	H	H	A	A	A	H	H	H	A	H	A	H	A	A	H	A	H	A	H	A	H	H	A	H	A
Result	D	W	L	L	D	L	W	D	L	W	D	W	L	W	D	L	L	D	D	L	W	D	L	W	L	D	W	W	L	W	D	D	W	L
Points	1	4	4	4	5	5	8	9	9	12	13	16	16	19	20	20	20	21	22	22	25	26	26	29	29	30	33	36	36	39	40	41	44	44
Position (West)	12	5	8	10	10	12	10	11	11	10	10	9	11	9	9	9	10	11	12	13	10	12	13	10	12	10	8	8	9	8	8	9	7	11

Updated to match(es) played on November 7, 2026. Source: Match reports
A = Away; H = Home; N = Neutral; W = Win; D = Draw; L = Loss; = Conference leader; = Playoffs berth; = Wild card berth

==== Match results ====
The MLS regular season schedule was released on November 20, 2025. The LA Galaxy will play 34 matches—17 at home and 17 away—primarily against the 14 other teams in the Western Conference; the team will also play six opponents from the Eastern Conference.

Win Draw Loss Void Postponed

=== February ===
February 22 1	LA Galaxy	1–1	New York City FC	Carson, California
4:00 p.m. PST	Klauss 2'; Garcés (yellow card) 59' (yellow-red card) 65'; Aude (yellow card) 59'	Report	Gray (yellow card) 42'; Trewin (yellow card) 56'; Fernández 66' (pen.); Parks (yellow card) 86'	Stadium: Dignity Health Sports Park; Attendance: 25,025; Referee: Victor Rivas

February 28 2	LA Galaxy	3–0	Charlotte FC	Carson, California
7:30 p.m. PST	Sanabria 8', (yellow card) 90+2'; Klauss 11', 13'; Ramos Jr. (yellow card) 89'	Report	Zaha (yellow card) 30'; Toklomati (yellow card) 43'; Agyemang (yellow card) 74'; Westwood (yellow card) 80'	Stadium: Dignity Health Sports Park; Attendance: 20,205; Referee: Joe Dickerson

=== March ===
March 7 3	Colorado Rapids	4–1	LA Galaxy	Commerce City, Colorado
6:30 p.m. PST	Yapi 23'; Manyoma 76'; R. Navarro 85', 89'	Report	Pec (yellow card) 45+1' (yellow-red card) 60'; Klauss 56'; Glesnes (yellow card) 88'	Stadium: Dick's Sporting Goods Park; Attendance: 14,568; Referee: Allen Chapman

March 14 4	LA Galaxy	1–2	Sporting Kansas City	Carson, California
6:30 p.m. PDT	Cerrillo (yellow card) 78'; Reus 82'	Report	Joveljić 45+2'; Meyer (yellow card) 69'; Berg Johnsen 74'	Stadium: Dignity Health Sports Park; Attendance: 18,232; Referee: Ismail Elfath

March 22 5	Portland Timbers	1–1	LA Galaxy	Portland, Oregon
1:30 p.m. PDT	Velde 13'; K. Miller (red card) 20'; Bye (yellow card) 61'; Smith (yellow card) 77'; Antony (yellow card) 81'; Bonetig (yellow card) 84'	Report	Klauss 30'; Sanabria (yellow card) 90+3'	Stadium: Providence Park; Attendance: 23,075; Referee: Drew Fischer

=== April ===
April 4 6	LA Galaxy	1–2	Minnesota United FC	Carson, California
7:30 p.m. PDT	Reus 57'; Wynder (yellow card) 70'; Garcés (yellow card) 90+8'	Report	Markanich (yellow card) 44', (goal) 51'; Duggan (yellow card) 64'; Yeboah 67'; Duncan (yellow card) 90+8'	Stadium: Dignity Health Sports Park; Attendance: 22,447; Referee: Malik Badawi

April 11 7	Austin FC	1–2	LA Galaxy	Austin, Texas
11:30 a.m. PDT	Sabovic (yellow card) 52'; Biro (yellow card) 75'; Uzuni 85'; Desler (yellow card) 90+4'	Report	Cuevas (yellow card) 24'; Yoshida 34'; Cerrillo (yellow card) 42'; Thommy 78'; Marcinkowski (yellow card) 90'; Klauss (yellow card) 90+4'	Stadium: Q2 Stadium; Attendance: 20,738; Referee: Tori Penso

April 18 8	FC Dallas	2–2	LA Galaxy	Frisco, Texas
5:30 p.m. PDT	Musa 7', 38'; Ibeagha (yellow card) 28'; Johansson (yellow card) 83'	Report	Sanabria 43'; Paintsil 45+3'	Stadium: Toyota Stadium; Attendance: 11,004; Referee: Marcos de Oliveira

April 22 9	Columbus Crew	2–1	LA Galaxy	Columbus, Ohio
4:30 p.m. PDT	Gazdag 40'; Rossi 47'	Report	Pec (yellow card) 45+5', (goal) 86'	Stadium: ScottsMiracle-Gro Field; Attendance: 19,049; Referee: Marcos de Oliveira

April 26 10	LA Galaxy	2–1	Real Salt Lake	Carson, California
4:00 p.m. PDT	Reus 9', 85' (pen.); Haak (yellow card) 21'; Sanabria (yellow card) 42'; Cuevas (yellow card) 57'; Wynder (yellow card) 90+3'	Report	Marcinkowski 45+4' (o.g.); Caliskan (yellow card) 48'; Sanabria (yellow card) 55'; Luna (yellow card) 63'; Junqua (yellow card) 83'	Stadium: Dignity Health Sports Park; Attendance: 19,773; Referee: Victor Rivas

=== May ===
May 2 11	LA Galaxy	1–1	Vancouver Whitecaps FC	Carson, California
7:30 p.m. PDT	Cuevas (yellow card) 26'; Paintsil 46'; Sanabria (yellow card) 65'; Cerrillo (yellow card) 67'; Glesnes (yellow card) 90+1'; Pec (yellow card) 90+3'	Report	Cubas (yellow card) 33'; Ocampo (yellow card) 66'; Laborda 81'; Berhalter (yellow card) 84'; Blackmon (yellow card) 87'; Larraz (yellow card) 90+5'	Stadium: Dignity Health Sports Park; Attendance: 19,429; Referee: Alexis Da Silva

May 9 12	Atlanta United FC	1–2	LA Galaxy	Atlanta, Georgia
4:30 p.m. PDT	Gregersen (yellow card) 26'; Sanchez (yellow card) 28'; Berrocal (yellow card) 30'; Fortune 69'	Report	Glesnes (yellow card) 53'; Pec 74', 79'	Stadium: Mercedes-Benz Stadium; Attendance: 40,392; Referee: Fotis Bazakos

May 13 13	Sporting Kansas City	3–1	LA Galaxy	Kansas City, Kansas
5:30 p.m. PDT	Capemba 32'; Bassong (yellow card) 41'; Joveljić 45+4'; Harris 70'	Report	Cuevas (yellow card) 49'; Pec (yellow card) 79', (goal) 89'	Stadium: Sporting Park; Attendance: 14,188; Referee: Ricardo Montero

May 16 14	Seattle Sounders FC	0–2	LA Galaxy	Seattle, Washington
6:00 p.m. PDT	Kingston (yellow card) 44'	Report	Haak (yellow card) 12'; Pec 23'; Yamane (yellow card) 45+4'; Marcinkowski (yellow card) 89'; Cerrillo (yellow card) 89'; Nascimento 90+2'	Stadium: Lumen Field; Attendance: 32,659; Referee: Joe Dickerson

May 23 15	LA Galaxy	1–1	Houston Dynamo FC	Carson, California
7:30 p.m. PDT	Paintsil 30', (yellow card) 37'	Report	Bogusz (yellow card) 20'; Resch (yellow card) 38'; Guilherme 41'; Andrade (yellow card) 57'	Stadium: Dignity Health Sports Park; Attendance: 23,638; Referee: Lorenzo Hernandez

=== July ===
July 17 16	LA Galaxy	0–3	Los Angeles FC	Carson, California
7:30 p.m. PDT	Cerrillo (yellow card) 34'; Glesnes (yellow card) 45+2'; Miller (yellow card) 80'	Report	Delgado 26'; Bouanga 45+1' (pen.); Son Heung-Min 57'	Stadium: Dignity Health Sports Park; Attendance: 24,325; Referee: Rubiel Vazquez

July 22 17	LA Galaxy	1–3	St. Louis City SC	Carson, California
7:30 p.m. PDT	Garcés (yellow card) 45+1' (yellow-red card) 49'; Reus (yellow card) 45+3'; Glesnes (yellow card) 71'; Elgersma 86'	Report	MacNaughton 42', (yellow card) 56'; Hartel 45+1'; Becher 68'	Stadium: Dignity Health Sports Park; Attendance: 17,322; Referee: Malik Badawi

July 25 18	San Jose Earthquakes	1–1	LA Galaxy	Stanford, California
7:30 p.m. PDT	Roberts 63'; Leroux (yellow card) 80'; Harkes (yellow card) 81'; Ricketts (yellow card) 90'; Kikanović (yellow card) 90+7'	Report	Paintsil 13', (yellow card) 90+7'; Sanabria (yellow card) 43'; Aude (yellow card) 45'	Stadium: Stanford Stadium; Attendance: 43,026; Referee: Armando Villarreal

=== August ===
August 1 19	LA Galaxy	0–0	FC Dallas	Carson, California
7:30 p.m. PDT	Glesnes (yellow card) 53'; Nelson (yellow card) 86'	Report	Delgado (yellow card) 4'; Cappis (yellow card) 31'; Kaick (yellow card) 35'; Norris (yellow card) 63'	Stadium: Dignity Health Sports Park; Attendance: 18,122; Referee: Fotis Bazakos

August 15 20	Houston Dynamo FC	1–0	LA Galaxy	Houston, Texas
5:30 p.m. PDT	Guilherme 21' (pen.); Herrera (yellow card) 45+1'; Ennali (yellow card) 56'; Aliyu (yellow card) 90+9' (yellow-red card) 90+11'	Report	Garcés (red card) 58'; Lozano (yellow card) 90+4'	Stadium: Shell Energy Stadium; Attendance: 21,063; Referee: Ricardo Fierro

August 19 21	LA Galaxy	1–0	San Jose Earthquakes	Carson, California
7:30 p.m. PDT	Miller (yellow card) 24'; Sanabria (yellow card) 37', (yellow card) 45' (red card); Paintsil 79'; Haak (yellow card) 90+2'	Report	Fernandez (yellow card) 29'; Romney (yellow card) 57'; Jasinski (yellow card) 84'	Stadium: Dignity Health Sports Park; Attendance: 15,435; Referee: Ramy Touchan

August 22 22	CF Montréal	2–2	LA Galaxy	Montreal, Quebec
4:30 p.m. PDT	Ríos 16'; Craig (yellow card) 67'; Owusu 79'; Ceballos (yellow card) 90+1'	Report	Ramos Jr. 19'; Yoshida 48'; Marcinkowski (red card) 68'	Stadium: Saputo Stadium; Attendance: 19,619; Referee: Lorenzo Hernandez

August 29 23	San Diego FC	3–1	LA Galaxy	San Diego, California
7:30 p.m. PDT	Achouri 11'; Tverskov (yellow card) 23' (red card) 50'; Pirani (yellow card) 30'; Godoy (yellow card) 39'; Sargeant 48'; Pellegrino 70'; dos Santos (yellow card) 89'	Report	Reus (yellow card) 21'; Lozano 55'; Paintsil (yellow card) 65'	Stadium: Snapdragon Stadium; Attendance: 27,971; Referee: Tori Penso

=== September ===
September 5 24	LA Galaxy	2–1	New England Revolution	Carson, California
6:30 p.m. PDT	Reus 11' (pen.); Taylor 33'; Miller (yellow card) 59'; Lozano (yellow card) 62'	Report	Sands (yellow card) 10'; Harrison (yellow card) 44'; Fofana (yellow card) 76'; Gil 90+6' (pen.)	Stadium: Dignity Health Sports Park; Attendance: 18,353; Referee: Drew Fischer

September 9 25	Vancouver Whitecaps FC	3–0	LA Galaxy	Vancouver, British Columbia
7:30 p.m. PDT	White 8'; Gauld 57'; Caicedo 90' (pen.); Diaby (yellow card) 90+2'	Report	Haak (yellow card) 74'; Roberto (yellow card) 74'; Garcés (yellow card) 89'	Stadium: BC Place; Attendance: 20,947; Referee: Pierre-Luc Lauziére

September 12 26	LA Galaxy	1–1	Seattle Sounders FC	Carson, California
7:30 p.m. PDT	Reus 44' (pen.)	Report	Arriola 81'; Kingston (yellow card) 90+5'; Dotson (yellow card) 90+8'	Stadium: Dignity Health Sports Park; Attendance: 20,489; Referee: Marcos de Oliveira

September 19 27	Minnesota United FC	2–3	LA Galaxy	Saint Paul, Minnesota
5:30 p.m. PDT	Caldeira 23'; Yeboah 30' (pen.); Harvey (yellow card) 69'	Report	Ruiz 12'; Taylor (yellow card) 26'; Klauss 76'; Reus 80'	Stadium: Allianz Field; Attendance: 19,634; Referee: Sergii Demianchuk

September 26 28	LA Galaxy	3–2	Colorado Rapids	Carson, California
7:30 p.m. PDT	Ruiz (yellow card) 46'; Cannon 54' (o.g.); Klauss 66'; Haak 74'	Report	Phillip 4'; Rosenberry (yellow card) 10'; Holding (yellow card) 31'; Aaronson 39'; Atencio (yellow card) 53'	Stadium: Dignity Health Sports Park; Attendance: 19,452; Referee: Armando Villarreal

=== October ===
October 11 29	St. Louis City SC	6–2	LA Galaxy	St. Louis, Missouri
4:00 p.m. PDT	Holse 2', 7', 21'; Durkin (yellow card) 39'; Navarro 45' (pen.), 53'; MacNaughton 45+7'; Wallem (yellow card) 63'	Report	Taylor 31'; Aude (yellow card) 67'; Klauss 71'; Miller (yellow card) 75'	Stadium: Energizer Park; Attendance: 22,423; Referee: Joe Dickerson

October 14 30	LA Galaxy	2–0	Portland Timbers	Carson, California
7:30 p.m. PDT	Reus 18'; Ruiz (yellow card) 29'; Roberto (yellow card) 31'; Haak (yellow card) 47', (goal) 80'	Report	Fory (yellow card) 39'; Velde (yellow card) 62'; Da Costa (yellow card) 82'	Stadium: Dignity Health Sports Park; Attendance: 13,337; Referee: Chris Penso

October 17 31	LA Galaxy	2–2	San Diego FC	Carson, California
7:30 p.m. PDT	Klauss 4', (yellow card) 45+1'; Thommy 17'; Reus (yellow card) 90+3'	Report	Dreyer 10' (pen.); Godoy (yellow card) 35'; Pirani 39'	Stadium: Dignity Health Sports Park; Attendance: 21,264; Referee: Rubiel Vazquez

October 25 32	Los Angeles FC	2–2	LA Galaxy	Los Angeles, California
6:00 p.m. PDT	Bouanga 53'; Porteous (yellow card) 55'; Walta 62'	Report	Paintsil 34', 51'; Ruiz (yellow card) 90+3'	Stadium: BMO Stadium; Attendance: 22,323; Referee: Armando Villarreal

October 31 33	LA Galaxy	4–1	Austin FC	Carson, California
2:00 p.m. PDT	Klauss 10'; Lozano 38'; Taylor 48'; Roberto 66'; Reus (yellow card) 87'	Report	Šabović (yellow card) 23'; Torres 54'; Kolmanič (red card) 90+5'	Stadium: Dignity Health Sports Park; Attendance: 17,238; Referee: Lukasz Szpala

=== November ===
November 7 34	Real Salt Lake	2–1	LA Galaxy	Sandy, Utah
4:00 p.m. PST	Solans 10', (yellow card) 77'; Booth 13'; Henry (yellow card) 16'; Sanabria (yellow card) 45+3'	Report	de Fougerolles 40' (o.g.), (yellow card) 55'; Garcés (yellow card) 87'	Stadium: America First Field; Attendance: 20,738; Referee: Joe Dickerson

=== CONCACAF Champions Cup ===
==== Round One ====
February 19 Round One; 1st Leg	Sporting San Miguelito (Panama)	1–1	(United States) LA Galaxy	Penonomé, Panama
5:00 p.m. PST	Tello 37'; Avila (yellow card) 83'; Betancourt (yellow card) 90'	Report	Paintsil 68'; Sanabria (yellow card) 76'	Stadium: Estadio Universidad Latina; Attendance: 4,064; Referee: Nelson Salgado (Honduras)

February 25 Round One; 2nd Leg	LA Galaxy (United States)	0–0 (1(a)–1 agg.)	(Panama) Sporting San Miguelito	Carson, California
8:00 p.m. PST	Nascimento (red card) 90+5'	Report	Ramírez (yellow card) 90+6'	Stadium: Dignity Health Sports Park; Attendance: 11,603; Referee: Iván Barton (El Salvador)
Note: 1–1 on aggregate. LA Galaxy won on away goals.

==== Round of 16 ====
March 11 Round of 16; 1st Leg	LA Galaxy (United States)	3–0	(Jamaica) Mount Pleasant	Carson, California
6:30 PM PDT	Pec 6', 89', 90+6'; Nelson (yellow card) 26'; Klauss (yellow card) 53'; Wynder (yellow card) 90+4'	Report	Phillips (yellow card) 36'; Chambers (yellow card) 64'	Stadium: Dignity Health Sports Park; Attendance: 4,287; Referee: Reon Radix (Grenada)

March 19 Round of 16; 2nd Leg	Mount Pleasant (Jamaica)	0–3 (0–6 agg.)	(United States) LA Galaxy	Kingston, Jamaica
4:00 PM PDT		Report	Klauss 18'; Pec 61', 87'	Stadium: National Stadium; Attendance: 1,765; Referee: Kwinsi Williams (Trinidad and Tobago)
Note: LA Galaxy won 6–0 on aggregate.

==== Quarterfinals ====
April 8 Quarterfinals; 1st Leg	Toluca (Mexico)	4–2	(United States) LA Galaxy	Toluca, Mexico
8:00 PM PDT	Castro 12'; Paulinho 43', 73', 86'; Méndez (yellow card) 89'	Report	Cerrillo (yellow card) 36'; Pec 66'; Reus 77'	Stadium: Estadio Nemesio Díez; Attendance: 27,035; Referee: Saíd Martínez (Honduras)

April 15 Quarterfinals; 2nd Leg	LA Galaxy (United States)	0–3 (2–7 agg.)	(Mexico) Toluca	Carson, California
6:00 PM PDT		Report	Gallardo 10'; Barbosa (yellow card) 54'; Paulinho 58', 64'	Stadium: Dignity Health Sports Park; Attendance: 15,473; Referee: Mario Escobar (Guatemala)
Note: Toluca won 7–2 on aggregate.
