= 2025 LA Galaxy season =

American soccer club season

LA Galaxy
2025 season
- General manager: Will Kuntz
- Head coach: Greg Vanney
- Stadium: Dignity Health Sports Park
- MLS: Conference: 14th Overall: 26th
- MLS Cup playoffs: Did not qualify
- Leagues Cup: Third place
- CONCACAF Champions Cup: Quarter-finals
- Campeones Cup: Runners-up
- Top goalscorer: League: Joseph Paintsil (10); All: Joseph Paintsil (15)
- Average home league attendance: 20,067
Home colors	Away colors

The 2025 season was the 30th season for the LA Galaxy, a team in Major League Soccer, the top tier of the American soccer pyramid. The Galaxy played their home matches at Dignity Health Sports Park in the Los Angeles suburb of Carson, California. The team opened the season on February 23, 2025, losing at home to expansion team San Diego FC.

In addition to competing in MLS, the club also competed in Leagues Cup and hosted the Campeones Cup. They also qualified for the CONCACAF Champions Cup for the first time since 2015–16 and were eliminated in the quarterfinals by Tigres UANL.

The Galaxy entered the season as defending MLS Cup champions after winning their record sixth title in the 2024 final. With no wins in their first ten matches, they set the worst record for a defending MLS Cup champion.

== Management team ==
Position	Name
Owner	(United States) Philip Anschutz
President and CEO	(United States) Dan Beckerman
General Manager	(United States) Will Kuntz
Technical Director	(Denmark) Mikkel Dencher
Head coach	(United States) Greg Vanney
Assistant coach	(United States) Dan Calichman
Assistant coach	(United States) Nick Theslof
Assistant coach	(Canada) Jason Bent
Goalkeeping Coach	(United States) Kevin Hartman

== Squad information ==
As of August 22, 2025

Note: Flags indicate national team as defined under FIFA eligibility rules; some limited exceptions apply. Players may hold more than one non-FIFA nationality.

No.	Pos.	Nation	Player
1	GK	SRB	Novak Mićović
2	DF	JPN	Miki Yamane
3	DF	ARG	Julián Aude
4	DF	JPN	Maya Yoshida (captain)
5	DF	DEN	Mathias Jørgensen
6	MF	USA	Edwin Cerrillo
7	MF	URU	Diego Fagúndez
8	MF	URU	Lucas Sanabria
9	FW	BRA	Matheus Nascimento (on loan from Botafogo)
10	MF	ESP	Riqui Puig (DP)
11	FW	BRA	Gabriel Pec (DP)
12	GK	USA	JT Marcinkowski
14	DF	USA	John Nelson
15	DF	ESA	Eriq Zavaleta

No.	Pos.	Nation	Player
16	MF	USA	Isaiah Parente
17	FW	USA	Christian Ramirez
18	MF	GER	Marco Reus
19	DF	USA	Mauricio Cuevas
21	FW	USA	Tucker Lepley
22	MF	USA	Elijah Wynder
24	FW	USA	Rubén Ramos
25	DF	COL	Carlos Garcés
26	DF	USA	Harbor Miller
27	FW	ESP	Miguel Berry
28	FW	GHA	Joseph Paintsil (DP)
30	MF	CRC	Gino Vivi
31	GK	USA	Brady Scott
63	DF	USA	Chris Rindov

=== Transfers ===
==== Transfers In ====
Pos.	Player	Transferred from	Fee/notes	Date
MF	(United States) Sean Davis	(United States) Nashville SC	Trade	December 19, 2024
DF	(Denmark) Mathias Jørgensen	(Belgium) Anderlecht	Transfer	January 15, 2025
GK	(United States) JT Marcinkowski	(United States) San Jose Earthquakes	Free	January 16, 2025
MF	(United States) Elijah Wynder	(United States) Louisville City FC	Transfer	January 26, 2025
MF	(Uruguay) Lucas Sanabria	(Uruguay) Nacional	$5,000,000 ($200,000 GAM)	February 8, 2025
FW	(United States) Christian Ramirez	(United States) Columbus Crew	Trade	February 12, 2025
FW	(Brazil) Matheus Nascimento	(Brazil) Botafogo	Loan	February 19, 2025

==== Transfers Out ====
Pos.	Player	Transferred to	Fee/notes	Date
MF	(Uruguay) Gastón Brugman	(United States) Nashville SC	Trade	December 19, 2024
DF	(United States) Jalen Neal	(Canada) CF Montréal	Trade	January 6, 2025
MF	(United States) Mark Delgado	(United States) Los Angeles FC	Trade	January 22, 2025
FW	(Serbia) Dejan Joveljić	(United States) Sporting Kansas City	Trade	February 1, 2025
FW	(Cameroon) Aaron Bibout	(Sweden) Västerås SK	Transfer	March 25, 2025
MF	(Mexico) Jonathan Pérez	(United States) Nashville SC	Trade	August 21, 2025
GK	(United States) John McCarthy	(United States) New York Red Bulls	Trade	August 22, 2025

== Draft picks ==
=== MLS Re-Entry Draft picks ===
2024 LA Galaxy Re-Entry Picks
Round	Selection	Player	Position	Team	Notes
1 (Stage 1)	29	PASS	PASS	PASS	PASS
2 (Stage 2)	29	PASS	PASS	PASS	PASS

=== MLS SuperDraft picks ===
Draft picks are not automatically signed to the team roster. Only those who are signed to a contract will be listed as transfers in.

2025 LA Galaxy SuperDraft Picks
Round	Pick	Player	Position	College	Conference
1	20 (Note: The LA Galaxy acquired the natural first round pick for FC Cincinnati in the 2025 MLS SuperDraft and a conditional $50,000 in 2025 GAM in exchange for the Right of First Refusal to sign Teenage Hadebe.)	(United States) Jason Bucknor	DF	University of Michigan; Big Ten Conference	
2	60	(United States) Jacob Woznicki	FW	Hofstra University; Coastal Athletic Association	
3	90	(United States) Nicklaus Sullivan	FW	Los Angeles FC 2 MLS Next Pro	

== Competitions ==
=== Overview ===
Competition	First match	Last match	Starting round	Final position	Record							
Competition	First match	Last match	Starting round	Final position	Pld	W	D	L	GF	GA	GD	Win %
Major League Soccer	February 23, 2025	October 18, 2025	Matchday 1	14th	34	7	9	18	46	66	−20	20.59
Leagues Cup	July 31, 2025	August 31, 2025	League Phase	Third Place	5	4	1	0	14	5	+9	80.00
CONCACAF Champions Cup	March 5, 2025	April 8, 2025	Round of 16	Quarterfinals	4	1	1	2	6	5	+1	25.00
Campeones Cup	October 1, 2025		Final	Runners-up	1	0	0	1	2	3	−1	0.00
Total					44	12	11	21	68	79	−11	27.27

Last updated: October 18, 2025
Source: Competitions

Win Draw Loss

All matches are in Pacific Time

=== Preseason ===
January 27 Friendly	LA Galaxy	0–2	New York City FC	Carson, California
1:00 p.m. PST			Bakrar (2nd half); Fernández (2nd half)	Stadium: Dignity Health Sports Park; Attendance: 0
Note: Played behind closed doors.

February 5 Coachella Valley Invitational	LA Galaxy	1–1	Austin FC	Indio, California
11:00 a.m. PST	Pec 8'	Report	Bukari 79'	Stadium: Empire Polo Club; Attendance: N/A; Referee: N/A

February 9 Coachella Valley Invitational	LA Galaxy	2–2	Charlotte FC	Indio, California
10:00 a.m. PST	Yoshida 24'; Berry 69'	Report	Bronico 15'; Abada 68' (pen.)	Stadium: Empire Polo Club; Attendance: N/A; Referee: N/A

February 12 Coachella Valley Invitational	LA Galaxy	2–1	Minnesota United FC	Indio, California
11:00 a.m. PST	Lepley 50', 58'	Report	Markanich 69'	Stadium: Empire Polo Club; Attendance: N/A; Referee: N/A

February 15 Coachella Valley Invitational	LA Galaxy	0–1	Chicago Fire FC	Indio, California
12:00 p.m. PST	Garcés (yellow card) 53'		Gutiérrez 22'; Bamba (yellow card) 62'	Stadium: Empire Polo Club

=== Major League Soccer (MLS) ===
==== Standings ====
MLS Western Conference table (2025)
Pos	Team	Pld	W	L	T	GF	GA	GD	Pts
11	Colorado Rapids	34	11	15	8	44	56	−12	41
12	Houston Dynamo FC	34	9	15	10	43	56	−13	37
13	St. Louis City SC	34	8	18	8	44	58	−14	32
14	LA Galaxy	34	7	18	9	46	66	−20	30
15	Sporting Kansas City	34	7	20	7	46	70	−24	28

Source: MLS
Rules for classification: 1) points; 2) total wins; 3) total goal differential; 4) total goals scored; 5) fewer disciplinary points; 6) away goal differential; 7) away goals scored; 8) home goals differential; 9) home goals scored; 10) coin toss (2 clubs tied) or drawing of lots (≥3 clubs tied)

Overall MLS standings table (2025)
Pos	Team	Pld	W	L	T	GF	GA	GD	Pts	Qualification
24	St. Louis City SC	34	8	18	8	44	58	−14	32	
25	Toronto FC	34	6	14	14	37	44	−7	32	
26	LA Galaxy	34	7	18	9	46	66	−20	30	Qualification for the CONCACAF Champions Cup round one (Note: As third place of Leagues Cup)
27	Sporting Kansas City	34	7	20	7	46	70	−24	28	
28	CF Montréal	34	6	18	10	34	60	−26	28	

Source: MLS
Rules for classification: 1) points; 2) total wins; 3) total goal differential; 4) total goals scored; 5) fewer disciplinary points; 6) away goal differential; 7) away goals scored; 8) home goals differential; 9) home goals scored; 10) coin toss (2 clubs tied) or drawing of lots (≥3 clubs tied)

==== Results summary ====
Overall								Home						Away					
Pld	Pts	W	L	T	GF	GA	GD	W	L	T	GF	GA	GD	W	L	T	GF	GA	GD
34	30	7	18	9	46	66	−20	7	8	2	27	28	−1	0	10	7	19	38	−19

Last updated: Complete
Source: MLS results
Pld = Matches played; Pts = Points; W = Matches won; T = Matches tied; L = Matches lost; GF = Goals for; GA = Goals against; GD = Goal difference

==== Results by round ====
Round	1	2	3	4	5	6	7	8	9	10	11	12	13	14	15	16	17	18	19	20	21	22	23	24	25	26	27	28	29	30	31	32	33	34
Stadium	H	A	H	A	A	H	A	H	A	H	A	A	A	H	A	H	H	H	A	A	H	H	H	A	H	A	H	A	A	H	H	A	H	H
Result	L	L	L	D	D	L	L	D	L	L	L	L	L	D	L	L	W	D	L	D	W	W	L	D	L	L	W	D	D	L	W	L	W	W
Points	0	0	0	1	2	2	2	3	3	3	3	3	3	4	4	4	7	8	8	9	12	15	15	16	16	16	19	20	21	21	24	24	27	30
Position (West)	13	14	15	15	14	14	15	15	15	15	15	15	15	15	15	15	15	15	15	15	15	15	15	15	15	15	15	15	15	15	15	15	15	14

Source: Match reports
A = Away; H = Home; N = Neutral; W = Win; D = Draw; L = Loss; = Conference leader; = Playoffs berth; = Wild card berth

==== Match results ====
The MLS regular season schedule was released on December 19, 2024. The LA Galaxy will play 34 matches—17 at home and 17 away—primarily against the 14 other teams in the Western Conference; the team will also play six opponents from the Eastern Conference. The regular season will include a break for the FIFA Club World Cup in June and for the 2025 Leagues Cup in August.

Win Draw Loss Void Postponed

February 23 1	LA Galaxy	0–2	San Diego FC	Carson, California
4:00 p.m. PST		Report	Godoy (yellow card) 45'; Dreyer 52', 90+3'; Negri (yellow card) 56'	Stadium: Dignity Health Sports Park; Attendance: 25,224; Referee: Allen Chapman

March 2 2	Vancouver Whitecaps FC	2–1	LA Galaxy	Vancouver, British Columbia
2:00 p.m. PST	Adekugbe 3'; Berhalter (yellow card) 35'; Ocampo (yellow card) 78'; White 87', (yellow card) 88'	Report	Pec (yellow card) 18', (goal) 39'; Cerrillo (yellow card) 42'; Fagúndez (yellow card) 52'	Stadium: BC Place; Attendance: 21,124; Referee: Drew Fischer

March 9 3	LA Galaxy	0–3	St. Louis City SC	Carson, California
4:00 p.m. PDT	Cerrillo (yellow card) 33'	Report	Teuchert 44'; Hartel 49'; Horn (yellow card) 52'; Yaro (yellow card) 72'; Becher 84'	Stadium: Dignity Health Sports Park; Attendance: 19,271; Referee: Jair Marrufo

March 16 4	Portland Timbers	1–1	LA Galaxy	Portland, Oregon
1:30 p.m. PDT	Fory (yellow card) 26'; Mora 49'	Report	Miller (yellow card) 47'; Ramírez 81'; Garcés (yellow card) 90+6'	Stadium: Providence Park; Attendance: 20,153; Referee: Lukasz Szpala

March 22 5	Minnesota United FC	2–2	LA Galaxy	Saint Paul, Minnesota
1:30 p.m. PDT	Jeong (yellow card) 12'; Yeboah 19', 87' (pen.); Romero (yellow card) 73'	Report	Ramírez 26'; Pec (yellow card) 45+2'; Wynder (yellow card) 56'; Fagúndez (yellow card) 69'; Garcés 90'	Stadium: Allianz Field; Attendance: 19,607; Referee: Chris Penso

March 29 6	LA Galaxy	1–2	Orlando City SC	Carson, California
7:30 p.m. PDT	Ramírez 14'; Yamane (yellow card) 28'; Pec (yellow card) 62'; Parente 89'	Report	Araújo (yellow card) 52'; Atuesta (yellow card) 62'; Ojeda 76' (pen.); Muriel 90'; Gallese (yellow card) 90+6'	Stadium: Dignity Health Sports Park; Attendance: 21,722; Referee: Jon Freemon

April 5 7	Real Salt Lake	2–0	LA Galaxy	Sandy, Utah
1:30 p.m. PDT	Vera (yellow card) 3'; Luna 21', 26'; Katranis (yellow card) 70'; Marczuk (yellow card) 74'	Report	Lepley (yellow card) 72'; Jørgensen (yellow card) 89'	Stadium: America First Field; Attendance: 19,304; Referee: Guido Gonzales Jr.

April 12 8	LA Galaxy	1–1	Houston Dynamo FC	Carson, California
7:30 p.m. PDT	Garcés (yellow card) 20'; Cerrillo (yellow card) 25'; Jørgensen (red card) 28'; Fagúndez 57'	Report	Ponce 14'; Dorsey (yellow card) 35'	Stadium: Dignity Health Sports Park; Attendance: 23,685; Referee: Joe Dickerson

April 19 9	Austin FC	1–0	LA Galaxy	Austin, Texas
10:45 a.m. PDT	Vázquez 81'; Hines-Ike (yellow card) 90+2' (yellow-red card) 90+2'	Report	Parente (yellow card) 53'; Cerrillo (yellow card) 58'; Garcés (yellow card) 90+1'	Stadium: Q2 Stadium; Attendance: 20,738; Referee: Rosendo Mendoza

April 27 10	LA Galaxy	2−4	Portland Timbers	Carson, California
6:00 p.m. PDT	Paintsil (yellow card) 45+1'; Ramírez 67'; Reus 69'; Yoshida (yellow card) 82'	Report	da Costa 38'; Moreno 53'; Kelsy 63'; Rodríguez 76' (pen.), (yellow card) 77'; Miller (yellow card) 90+4'	Stadium: Dignity Health Sports Park; Attendance: 21,215; Referee: Filip Dujic

May 4 11	Sporting Kansas City	1–0	LA Galaxy	Kansas City, Kansas
4:00 p.m. PDT	Yoshida 13' (o.g.); Leibold (yellow card) 42'	Report	Paintsil (yellow card) 38'; Garcés (yellow card) 45+2'	Stadium: Children's Mercy Park; Attendance: 17,902; Referee: Chris Penso

May 10 12	New York Red Bulls	7–0	LA Galaxy	Harrison, New Jersey
4:30 p.m. PDT	Choupo-Moting 7', 31'; Forsberg 16', 50'; Harper 68'; Eile (yellow card) 74'; Nealis (yellow card) 74'; Gjengarr 88'; Yamane 90+3' (o.g.)	Report	Garcés (yellow card) 10'; Aude (yellow card) 49'; Cuevas (yellow card) 73'; Cerrillo (yellow card) 74'; Wynder (yellow card) 78'	Stadium: Sports Illustrated Stadium; Attendance: 23,225; Referee: Guido Gonzales Jr.

May 14 13	Philadelphia Union	3–2	LA Galaxy	Chester, Pennsylvania
4:30 p.m. PDT	Harriel (yellow card) 6'; Glesnes 48'; Baribo 50', 90+6'	Report	Cuevas 31'; Fagúndez 37'; Ramírez (yellow card) 90+6'; Nelson (yellow card) 90+9'	Stadium: Subaru Park; Attendance: 15,539; Referee: Fotis Bazakos

May 18 14	LA Galaxy	2–2	Los Angeles FC	Carson, California
6:00 p.m. PDT	Reus 6', 87'; Yamane (yellow card) 45+2'; Cerrillo (yellow card) 77'	Report	Bouanga 13', (yellow card) 73'; Delgado (yellow card) 25'; Palencia (yellow card) 48'; Ordaz 50'	Stadium: Dignity Health Sports Park; Attendance: 23,083; Referee: Drew Fischer

May 24 15	San Diego FC	2–1	LA Galaxy	San Diego, California
1:30 p.m. PDT	Lozano (yellow card) 30', (goal) 90+5'; de la Torre 41'	Report	Cerrillo (yellow card) 37'; Fagúndez 40'; Pec (yellow card) 45+3'; Yamana (yellow card) 62'; Reus (yellow card) 84'	Stadium: Snapdragon Stadium; Attendance: 30,114; Referee: Jon Freemon

May 28 16	LA Galaxy	0–1	San Jose Earthquakes	Carson, California
7:15 p.m. PDT		Report	Kikanović (yellow card) 69'; Bouda 74'; Costa (yellow card) 90+1'	Stadium: Dignity Health Sports Park; Attendance: 15,345; Referee: Alexis Da Silva

May 31 17	LA Galaxy	2–0	Real Salt Lake	Carson, California
7:30 p.m. PDT	Sanabria 17'; Parente (yellow card) 54'; Paintsil 55'; Cerrillo (yellow card) 90+2'	Report	Vera (yellow card) 75'	Stadium: Dignity Health Sports Park; Attendance: 23,210; Referee: Rubiel Vazquez

June 14 18	St. Louis City SC	3−3	LA Galaxy	St. Louis, Missouri
1:30 p.m. PDT	Klauss 35', 47', 90+5'	Report	Pec 41', 87'; Nascimento 51'; Lepley (yellow card) 90+4'	Stadium: Energizer Park; Attendance: 22,423; Referee: Marcos de Oliveira

June 25 19	Colorado Rapids	2−0	LA Galaxy	Commerce City, Colorado
6:30 p.m. PDT (Note: The match between the Colorado Rapids vs LA Galaxy was in a 2+ hour weather delay.)	Mihailovic 24'; Harris 28'; Navarro (yellow card) 88'	Report	Sanabria (yellow card) 16'; Cerrillo (yellow card) 64'; Parente (yellow card) 89'	Stadium: Dick's Sporting Goods Park; Attendance: 14,497; Referee: Sergii Boiko
Note: The game was in a 2+ hour weather delay due to thunder and lightning in the Denver metropolitan area.

June 28 20	San Jose Earthquakes	1–1	LA Galaxy	Stanford, California
7:30 p.m. PDT	Rodrigues (yellow card) 11'; Leroux 16'; Floriani (yellow card) 46'	Report	Jørgensen (yellow card) 1'; Aude (yellow card) 42'; Garcés (yellow card) 50'; Reus 70'	Stadium: Stanford Stadium; Attendance: 42,881; Referee: Jair Marrufo

July 4 21	LA Galaxy	3−0	Vancouver Whitecaps FC	Carson, California
7:30 p.m. PDT	Nascimento 2', (yellow card) 18'; Paintsil 60', 77' (pen.)	Report	Laborda (yellow card) 35'; Nelson (yellow card) 55' (yellow-red card) 90+2'; Ocampo (yellow card) 72'; Veselinovic (yellow card) 74'; Utvik (yellow card) 86'	Stadium: Dignity Health Sports Park; Attendance: 19,557; Referee: Victor Rivas

July 12 22	LA Galaxy	2−1	D.C. United	Carson, California
7:30 p.m. PDT	Reus 23'; Yoshida (yellow card) 49'; Fagúndez 53'; Gabriel Pec (yellow card) 81'; Paintsil (yellow card) 90+6'	Report	Hopkins (yellow card) 12'; Bartlett (yellow card) 14'; Schnegg (yellow card) 63'; Pirani 77'; Herrera (yellow card) 88'; Servania (yellow card) 90+2'	Stadium: Dignity Health Sports Park; Attendance: 21,113; Referee: Timothy Ford

July 16 23	LA Galaxy	1−2	Austin FC	Carson, California
7:30 p.m. PDT	Cerrillo (yellow card) 3'; Aude (yellow card) 11'; Paintsil 90+3' (pen.)	Report	Uzuni 40'; Biro (yellow card) 44'; Bukari (yellow card) 52'; Desler (yellow card) 58'; Stuver (yellow card) 62'; Wolff 63'	Stadium: Dignity Health Sports Park; Attendance: 16,272; Referee: Ricardo Fierro

July 19 24	Los Angeles FC	3−3	LA Galaxy	Los Angeles, California
7:30 p.m. PDT	Bouanga 26', 67'; Dilrosun 31'; Palencia (yellow card) 39'; Segura (red card) 90+1'; Lloris (yellow card) 90+6'	Report	Pec 36' (pen.), 79', (yellow card) 90+3'; Sanabria (yellow card) 45+1'; Cuevas (yellow card) 90+1'; Fagúndez (yellow card) 90+1'; Yoshida 90+7'	Stadium: BMO Stadium; Attendance: 22,301; Referee: Guido Gonzales Jr.

August 10 25	LA Galaxy	0–4	Seattle Sounders FC	Carson, California
7:00 pm PDT		Report	Aude 25' (o.g.); Musovski 37', 54'; Brunell 85'	Stadium: Dignity Health Sports Park; Attendance: 18,748; Referee: Allen Chapman

August 16 26	Inter Miami CF	3–1	LA Galaxy	Fort Lauderdale, Florida
4:30 p.m. PDT	Alba 43'; Messi 83'; Suárez 90'	Report	Paintsil 59'	Stadium: Chase Stadium; Attendance: 20,846; Referee: Drew Fischer

August 23 27	LA Galaxy	3–0	Colorado Rapids	Carson, California
7:30 p.m. PDT	Miller 7'; Wynder 55', (yellow card) 69'; Pec 75'; Sanabria (yellow card) 90+2'	Report	Cannon (yellow card) 61'	Stadium: Dignity Health Sports Park; Attendance: 20,203; Referee: Pierre-Luc Lauziere

September 6 28	Houston Dynamo FC	1–1	LA Galaxy	Houston, Texas
5:30 p.m. PDT	Ponce 35'; Urso (yellow card) 71'	Report	Yoshida (yellow card) 52'; Cuevas (yellow card) 58'; Pec (yellow card) 90'; Sanabria 90+9'; Nelson (yellow card) 90+10'	Stadium: Shell Energy Stadium; Attendance: 18,471; Referee: Marcos de Oliveira
Note: Match moved from July 25 due to inclement weather in the Houston area.

September 13 29	Seattle Sounders FC	2–2	LA Galaxy	Seattle, Washington
5:30 p.m. PDT	Ferreira 5'; Ragen (yellow card) 6'; Baker-Whiting (yellow card) 36'; Musovski 41'	Report	Yoshida 44'; Yamane 87'	Stadium: Lumen Field; Attendance: 31,952; Referee: Rosendo Mendoza

September 20 30	LA Galaxy	2–3	FC Cincinnati	Carson, California
7:30 p.m. PDT	Paintsil 39'; Fagúndez (yellow card) 43'; Parente (yellow card) 45+4' (yellow-red card) 51'; Cuevas 90+1'	Report	Echenique 10'; Brenner 22', 88'; Hagglund (yellow card) 59'	Stadium: Dignity Health Sports Park; Attendance: 18,518; Referee: Malik Badawi

September 27 31	LA Galaxy	4–1	Sporting Kansas City	Carson, California
7:30 p.m. PDT	Paintsil 4', 25', 43'; Fagúndez 60'; Yamane (yellow card) 87'; Garcés (yellow card) 90+1'	Report	Joveljić 28'; Suleymanov (red card) 83'	Stadium: Dignity Health Sports Park; Attendance: 17,903; Referee: Fotis Bazakos

October 4 32	FC Dallas	2–1	LA Galaxy	Frisco, Texas
1:30 p.m. PDT	Musa 35'; Delgado 45+3'; Julio (yellow card) 90'	Report	Fagundez 4'; Cuevas (yellow card) 33'	Stadium: Toyota Stadium; Attendance: 11,004; Referee: Serhiy Boyko

October 11 33	LA Galaxy	2–1	FC Dallas	Carson, California
7:30 p.m. PDT	Wynder 42'; Pec (yellow card) 62', (goal) 87'; Cerrillo (yellow card) 82'; Parente (yellow card) 90+3'; Fagundez (yellow card) 90+4'	Report	Farrington (red card) 16'; Ramiro (yellow card) 21'; Julio 52'; Abubakar (yellow card) 61'; Musa (yellow card) 79'	Stadium: Dignity Health Sports Park; Attendance: 18,312; Referee: Jair Marrufo
Note: Match moved from August 30 due to LA Galaxy's participation in the 2025 Leagues Cup semifinal.

October 18 34	LA Galaxy	2–1	Minnesota United FC	Carson, California
6:00 p.m. PDT	Nascimento 12'; Paintsil 52'; Cerrillo (yellow card) 67' (yellow-red card) 90+7'	Report	Triantis (yellow card) 61'; Romero (yellow card) 79'; Pereyra 90+5'	Stadium: Dignity Health Sports Park; Attendance: 17,765; Referee: Rosendo Mendoza

=== U.S. Open Cup ===
LA Galaxy did not send their senior squad to the U.S. Open Cup as they were participating in the 2025 CONCACAF Champions Cup and the 2025 Leagues Cup; Ventura County FC were sent instead.

=== Leagues Cup ===
==== League stage ====
Pos	Team	Pld	W	PW	PL	L	GF	GA	GD	Pts	Qualification
1	Seattle Sounders FC	3	3	0	0	0	11	2	+9	9	Advance to knockout stage
2	Inter Miami CF	3	2	1	0	0	7	4	+3	8	Advance to knockout stage
3	LA Galaxy	3	2	0	1	0	10	3	+7	7	Advance to knockout stage
4	Orlando City SC	3	2	0	1	0	9	3	+6	7	Advance to knockout stage
5	Portland Timbers	3	2	0	1	0	6	1	+5	7	
6	Columbus Crew	3	2	0	1	0	6	3	+3	7	
7	Real Salt Lake	3	1	1	1	0	5	4	+1	6	

Source: Leagues Cup

Matchday	1	2	3
Ground	H	H	H
Result	W	D	W
Position	3	5	3
Points	3	4	7

Updated to match(es) played on August 7, 2025. Source: Leagues Cup
A = Away; H = Home; W = Win; D = Draw; L = Loss

July 31 Group Stage	LA Galaxy (United States)	5−2	(Mexico) Tijuana	Carson, California
8:00 pm PDT	Nascimento 16' (pen.); Pec 39'; Paintsil 65', 90+1'; Reus 82'	Report	Mora 21', 59'	Stadium: Dignity Health Sports Park; Attendance: 15,183; Referee: Mario Escobar (Gualtemala)

August 3 Group Stage	LA Galaxy (United States)	1−1 (7−8 p)	(Mexico) Cruz Azul	Carson, California
7:30 pm PDT	Reus (yellow card) 14'; Paintsil (yellow card) 70'; Fagúndez (yellow card) 72'; Pec 81'; Yoshida (yellow card) 90+1'; Garcés (yellow card) 90+3'	Report	Rodríguez 22'; Rivero (yellow card) 47'; Lira (yellow card) 70'; Márquez (yellow card) 84'	Stadium: Dignity Health Sports Park; Attendance: 24,285; Referee: Filiberto Martínez (El Salvador)
	Penalties
	Reus (penalty scored); Pec (penalty scored); Nascimento (penalty scored); Fagúndez (penalty scored); Paintsil (penalty scored); Cuevas (penalty scored); Nelson (penalty scored); Cerrillo (penalty missed); Garcés (penalty missed)		(penalty scored) Lira; (penalty scored) Rivero; (penalty scored) Piovi; (penalty scored) Rodríguez; (penalty scored) Ditta; (penalty scored) Márquez; (penalty scored) Romero; (penalty missed) Orozco; (penalty scored) Levy

August 7 Group Stage	LA Galaxy (United States)	4−0	(Mexico) Santos Laguna	Carson, California
8:15 pm PDT	Paintsil 1'; Nascimento 39', 74'; Yoshida 45+5'; Jørgensen (yellow card) 84'	Report	Lozano (yellow card) 25' (yellow-red card) 45'; Sordo (red card) 45+6'; Govea (yellow card) 53'	Stadium: Dignity Health Sports Park; Attendance: 12,883; Referee: Mario Escobar (Gualtemala)

==== Knockout stage ====
August 20 Quarterfinals	LA Galaxy (United States)	2−1	(Mexico) Pachuca	Carson, California
8:45 p.m. PDT	Aceves 27' (o.g.); Cerrillo (yellow card) 28'; Reus 37'; Mićović (yellow card) 55'; Cuevas (yellow card) 58'	Report	Pedraza (yellow card) 15'; Rodríguez (yellow card) 61'; Zurawski 90+6'	Stadium: Dignity Health Sports Park; Attendance: 16,559; Referee: Oshane Nation (Jamaica)

August 27 Semifinals	LA Galaxy (United States)	0−2	(United States) Seattle Sounders FC	Carson, California
7:45 p.m. PDT	Fagúndez (yellow card) 16'; Cuevas (yellow card) 20'; Aude (yellow card) 35'; Pec (yellow card) 62'; Yoshida (yellow card) 75'	Report	de la Vega 7'; Rothrock (yellow card) 35'; De Rosario 57'; C. Roldán (yellow card) 67'; Nouhou (red card) 83'	Stadium: Dignity Health Sports Park; Attendance: 16,255; Referee: Adonai Escobedo (Mexico)

August 31 Third place	LA Galaxy (United States)	2−1	(United States) Orlando City SC	Carson, California
2:00 p.m. PDT	Reus 9'; Paintsil 67'; Pec (yellow card) 90+6'	Report	Atuesta (yellow card) 37'; Ojeda 60'	Stadium: Dignity Health Sports Park; Attendance: 12,129; Referee: Pierre-Luc Lauziere (Canada)

With this win, the LA Galaxy have qualified for the 2026 CONCACAF Champions Cup.

=== CONCACAF Champions Cup ===
==== Round of 16 ====
March 5 Round of 16; 1st Leg	Herediano (Costa Rica)	1–0	(United States) LA Galaxy	Heredia, Costa Rica
5:30 p.m. PST	Aguilar 65'; Walker (yellow card) 85'; Amador (yellow card) 85'; Quirós (yellow card) 88'	Report	Ramos Jr. (yellow card) 30'; Yoshida (yellow card) 49'; Cerrillo (yellow card) 67'; Aude (yellow card) 84'	Stadium: Estadio Fello Meza; Attendance: 7,773; Referee: Adonai Escobedo (Mexico)

March 12 Round of 16; 2nd Leg	LA Galaxy (United States)	4–1 (4–2 agg.)	(Costa Rica) Herediano	Carson, California
7:30 p.m. PST	Aude 30'; Miller (yellow card) 35'; Berry 38'; Pec 53'; Ramírez 76'	Report	Tejeda 83'	Stadium: Dignity Health Sports Park; Attendance: 9,011; Referee: Ismael Cornejo (El Salvador)
Note: LA Galaxy win 4–2 on aggregate

==== Quarterfinals ====
April 1 Quarterfinals; 1st Leg	LA Galaxy (United States)	0–0	(Mexico) UANL	Carson, California
8:15 p.m. PDT	Parente (yellow card) 58'	Report	Angulo (yellow card) 57'	Stadium: Dignity Health Sports Park; Attendance: 13,434; Referee: Kwinsi Williams (Trinidad and Tobago)

April 8 Quarterfinals; 2nd Leg	UANL (Mexico)	3–2 (3–2 agg.)	(United States) LA Galaxy	San Nicolás de los Garza, Mexico
6:00 p.m. PDT	Ibáñez 9'; Antuna 11'; Gorriarán (yellow card) 38'; Zwarg 57'; Guzmán (yellow card) 61'	Report	Jørgensen (yellow card) 38'; Paintsil 40', (yellow card) 74'; Garcés 60'	Stadium: Estadido Universitario; Attendance: 34,435; Referee: Selvin Brown (Honduras)
Note: UANL won 3–2 on aggregate.

=== Campeones Cup ===
October 1 Final	LA Galaxy (United States)	2–3	(Mexico) Toluca	Carson, California
7:30 p.m. PST	Fagúndez 36' (pen.); Pec (yellow card) 39', (goal) 83'; Cerrillo (yellow card) 45+2'; Garcés (yellow card) 76'; Paintsil (yellow card) 80'	Report	Ruiz (yellow card) 34'; Pereira (yellow card) 35'; Castro 53'; Gallardo (yellow card) 62'; Romero 88', 90+4'	Stadium: Dignity Health Sports Park; Referee: Iván Barton (El Salvador)

== Friendlies ==
November 15 Friendly	LA Galaxy (United States)	v	(Mexico) Club America	Carson, California
6:30 p.m. PST				Stadium: Dignity Health Sports Park
