= 2024 LA Galaxy season =

American soccer club season

LA Galaxy
2024 season
- General manager: Will Kuntz
- Head coach: Greg Vanney
- Stadium: Dignity Health Sports Park
- MLS: Conference: 2nd Overall: 4th
- MLS Cup playoffs: Winners
- Leagues Cup: Round of 32
- Top goalscorer: League: Dejan Joveljić (19); All: Gabriel Pec (21)
- Highest home attendance: 70,076
- Lowest home attendance: 12,554
- Average home league attendance: 26,135
- Biggest win: LA 5–0 Colorado (Round 1)
- Biggest defeat: LA 1–3 Seattle (League Cup KO Stage)
Home colors	Away colors

The 2024 LA Galaxy season was the club's 29th season in Major League Soccer, the top tier of the American soccer pyramid. LA Galaxy play their home matches at Dignity Health Sports Park in the Los Angeles suburb of Carson, California. The Galaxy opened the season on February 25, 2024, hosting Inter Miami CF.

The Galaxy qualified for the playoffs for the first time since 2022 on September 14, and made their first MLS Cup appearance since 2014, winning a record-extending sixth MLS Cup.

== Squad information ==
As of August 16, 2024

Note: Flags indicate national team as defined under FIFA eligibility rules; some limited exceptions apply. Players may hold more than one non-FIFA nationality.

No.	Pos.	Nation	Player
2	DF	JPN	Miki Yamane
3	DF	ARG	Julián Aude
4	DF	JPN	Maya Yoshida (captain)
5	MF	URU	Gastón Brugman
7	FW	URU	Diego Fagúndez
8	MF	USA	Mark Delgado
9	FW	SRB	Dejan Joveljić
10	MF	ESP	Riqui Puig
11	FW	BRA	Gabriel Pec
14	DF	USA	John Nelson
15	DF	ESA	Eriq Zavaleta
18	MF	GER	Marco Reus
19	DF	USA	Mauricio Cuevas

No.	Pos.	Nation	Player
20	MF	USA	Edwin Cerrillo
21	MF	USA	Tucker Lepley
22	DF	URU	Martín Cáceres
24	DF	USA	Jalen Neal
25	DF	COL	Carlos Emiro Garcés
27	FW	ESP	Miguel Berry
28	FW	GHA	Joseph Paintsil
30	MF	CRC	Gino Vivi
31	GK	USA	Brady Scott
35	GK	SRB	Novak Mićović (on loan from Čukarički)
52	MF	USA	Isaiah Parente
77	GK	USA	John McCarthy
84	GK	USA	Ruben Ramos Jr

=== Transfers ===
==== Transfers In ====
Pos.	Player	Transferred from	Fee/notes	Date	Source
FW	(Spain) Miguel Berry	(United States) Atlanta United FC	Trade	December 19, 2023	
DF	(United States) John Nelson	(United States) St. Louis City SC	Free	December 21, 2023	
GK	(United States) John McCarthy	(United States) Los Angeles FC	Free	January 5, 2024	
DF	(Japan) Miki Yamane	(Japan) Kawasaki Frontale	Free	January 6, 2024	
FW	(Brazil) Gabriel Pec	(Brazil) Vasco da Gama	Transfer	January 30, 2024	
MF	(Ghana) Joseph Paintsil	(Belgium) Genk	Transfer	February 21, 2024	
FW	(Cameroon) Aaron Bibout	(United States) LA Galaxy II	Free	February 23, 2024	
MF	(United States) Tucker Lepley	(United States) UCLA Bruins	SuperDraft	February 23, 2024	
GK	(United States) Brady Scott	(United States) Columbus Crew	Free	March 8, 2024	
DF	(Colombia) Emiro Garcés	(Colombia) Deportivo Pereira	Loan	April 2, 2024	
MF	(United States) Isaiah Parente	(United States) Ventura County FC	Free	July 12, 2024	
MF	(Germany) Marco Reus	(Germany) Borussia Dortmund	Free	August 15, 2024	

==== Transfers Out ====
Pos.	Player	Transferred to	Fee/notes	Date	Source
MF	(Canada) Raheem Edwards	(Canada) CF Montréal	Trade	December 11, 2023	
FW	(United States) Preston Judd	(United States) San Jose Earthquakes	Trade	December 14, 2023	
DF	(Mexico) Tony Alfaro	(United States) El Paso Locomotive FC	Free	December 18, 2023	
MF	(United States) Tyler Boyd	(United States) Nashville SC	Trade	December 30, 2023	
FW	(England) Billy Sharp	(England) Hull City	Free	January 1, 2024	
FW	(Colombia) Michael Barrios	(Colombia) América de Cali	Free	January 4, 2024	
FW	(Mexico) Javier Hernández	(Mexico) Guadalajara	Free	January 24, 2024	
MF	(Brazil) Douglas Costa	(Brazil) Fluminense	Free	January 28, 2024	
DF	(Suriname) Kelvin Leerdam	(Netherlands) Heracles Almelo	Free	February 8, 2024	
DF	(Democratic Republic of the Congo) Chris Mavinga		Waivers	February 21, 2024	
GK	(England) Jonathan Bond	(England) Watford	Free	February 22, 2024	
MF	(United States) Adam Saldana	(Norway) KFUM Oslo	Free	March 27, 2024	
DF	(United States) Marcus Ferkranus	(Australia) Brisbane Roar FC	Transfer	June 6, 2024	
MF	(United States) Daniel Aguirre	(Mexico) Guadalajara	Transfer	June 10, 2024	
MF	(Mexico) Jonny Pérez	(United States) Nashville SC	Loan	July 30, 2024	

==== Draft picks ====
Draft picks are not automatically signed to the team roster. Only those who are signed to a contract will be listed as transfers in.

Round	Pick	Player	Position	College Conference
2	46	(United States) Ethan Brandt	GK	Western Michigan (MVC)
3	62	(United States) Tucker Lepley	MF	UCLA (Pac-12)

== Competitions ==
=== Preseason ===
The preseason schedule was announced on December 19, 2023.

February 3, 2024	LA Galaxy	1–2	St. Louis City SC	Carson, California
1:00 p.m. PST				Stadium: Dignity Health Sports Park

February 7, 2024 Coachella Valley Invitational	LA Galaxy	0–3	Charlotte FC	Indio, California
11:00 a.m. PST				Stadium: Empire Polo Club

February 11, 2024 Coachella Valley Invitational	LA Galaxy	1–3	Austin FC	Indio, California
10:00 a.m. PST				Stadium: Empire Polo Club

February 14, 2024 Coachella Valley Invitational	LA Galaxy	2–2	New York City FC	Indio, California
12:00 p.m. PST				Stadium: Empire Polo Club

February 17, 2024 Coachella Valley Invitational	LA Galaxy	2–0	New York Red Bulls	Indio, California
10:00 a.m. PST				Stadium: Empire Polo Club

=== Major League Soccer ===
==== Standings ====
MLS Western Conference table (2024)
Pos	Team	Pld	W	L	T	GF	GA	GD	Pts	Qualification
1	Los Angeles FC	34	19	8	7	63	43	+20	64	Qualification for round one, the Leagues Cup and the CONCACAF Champions Cup round one
2	LA Galaxy	34	19	8	7	69	50	+19	64	Qualification for round one and the Leagues Cup
3	Real Salt Lake	34	16	7	11	65	48	+17	59	Qualification for round one and the Leagues Cup
4	Seattle Sounders FC	34	16	9	9	51	35	+16	57	Qualification for round one and the Leagues Cup
5	Houston Dynamo FC	34	15	10	9	47	39	+8	54	Qualification for round one and the Leagues Cup

Source: MLS
Rules for classification: 1) points; 2) total wins; 3) total goal differential; 4) total goals scored; 5) fewer disciplinary points; 6) away goal differential; 7) away goals scored; 8) home goals differential; 9) home goals scored; 10) coin toss (2 clubs tied) or drawing of lots (≥3 clubs tied)

Overall MLS standings table
Pos	Team	Pld	W	L	T	GF	GA	GD	Pts	Qualification
2	Columbus Crew (L)	34	19	6	9	72	40	+32	66	Qualification for the CONCACAF Champions Cup round of 16 (Note: As winners of Leagues Cup)
3	Los Angeles FC (U)	34	19	8	7	63	43	+20	64	Qualification for the CONCACAF Champions Cup round one (Note: As runners-up of Leagues Cup)
4	LA Galaxy (C)	34	19	8	7	69	50	+19	64	Qualification for the CONCACAF Champions Cup round of 16 (Note: As 2024 MLS Cup champions)
5	FC Cincinnati	34	18	11	5	58	48	+10	59	Qualification for the CONCACAF Champions Cup round one (Note: As highest-ranked club in 2024 MLS Supporters' Shield not already qualified)
6	Real Salt Lake	34	16	7	11	65	48	+17	59	Qualification for the CONCACAF Champions Cup round one (Note: As second highest-ranked club in 2024 MLS Supporters' Shield not already qualified)

Source: MLS
Rules for classification: 1) points; 2) total wins; 3) total goal differential; 4) total goals scored; 5) fewer disciplinary points; 6) away goal differential; 7) away goals scored; 8) home goals differential; 9) home goals scored; 10) coin toss (2 clubs tied) or drawing of lots (≥3 clubs tied)
(C) MLS Cup champions; (L) Leagues Cup winners; (U) U.S. Open Cup winners

== Overview ==
Competition	First match	Last match	Starting round	Final position	Record							
Competition	First match	Last match	Starting round	Final position	Pld	W	D	L	GF	GA	GD	Win %
Major League Soccer	February 25, 2024	October 19, 2024	Matchday 1	2nd	34	19	7	8	69	50	+19	55.88
MLS Cup Playoffs	October 26, 2024	December 7, 2024	Round One	Champions	5	5	0	0	18	4	+14	100.00
Leagues Cup	July 31, 2024	August 8, 2024	Group Stage	Round of 32	3	2	0	1	5	6	−1	66.67
Total					42	26	7	9	92	60	+32	61.90

Last updated: November 30th, 2024
Source: Competitions

=== Results summary ===
Overall								Home						Away					
Pld	Pts	W	L	T	GF	GA	GD	W	L	T	GF	GA	GD	W	L	T	GF	GA	GD
34	64	19	8	7	69	50	+19	13	1	3	43	25	+18	6	7	4	26	25	+1

Last updated: December 9th, 2024
Source: MLS Results
Pld = Matches played; Pts = Points; W = Matches won; T = Matches tied; L = Matches lost; GF = Goals for; GA = Goals against; GD = Goal difference

==== Results by round ====
Round	1	2	3	4	5	6	7	8	9	10	11	12	13	14	15	16	17	18	19	20	21	22	23	24	25	26	27	28	29	30	31	32	33	34
Stadium	H	A	A	H	A	H	A	A	H	A	A	H	A	A	H	H	A	H	H	A	A	N	H	A	H	H	H	A	H	A	H	A	H	A
Result	D	W	D	D	W	W	L	W	W	L	D	D	D	D	W	W	L	W	W	W	W	L	W	L	W	W	W	L	W	L	W	W	W	L
Points	1	4	5	6	9	12	12	15	18	18	19	20	21	22	25	28	28	31	34	37	40	40	43	43	46	49	52	52	55	55	58	61	64	64
Position (West)	8	2	3	4	2	1	2	1	1	4	3	3	5	4	3	2	4	3	3	3	2	3	3	3	1	1	1	1	1	1	1	1	1	2

Updated to match(es) played on December 9th, 2024. Source: Match reports
A = Away; H = Home; W = Win; D = Draw; L = Loss; P = Postponed

=== Match results ===
Win Draw Loss Void Postponed

=== February ===
February 25 1	LA Galaxy	1–1	Inter Miami CF	Carson, California
6:00 p.m. PST	Delgado (yellow card) 46' (yellow-red card) 88'; Joveljić 75'	Report	Gressel (yellow card) 11'; Busquets (yellow card) 21'; Alba (yellow card) 51'; Messi 90+2'	Stadium: Dignity Health Sports Park; Attendance: 27,642; Referee: Gabriele Ciampi

=== March ===
March 2 2	San Jose Earthquakes	1–3	LA Galaxy	San Jose, California
7:30 p.m. PST	Akapo (yellow card) 35'; Judd 70', (yellow card) 74'; Vítor Costa (yellow card) 90+3'	Report	Paintsil 18'; Delgado (yellow card) 29'; Joveljić 43'; Puig 48'	Stadium: PayPal Park; Attendance: 18,000; Referee: Cristian Campo Hernandez

March 10 3	Nashville SC	2–2	LA Galaxy	Nashville, Tennessee
12:00 p.m. PDT	Yearwood (yellow card) 39', (goal) 58'; Bunbury 54' (pen.); Shaffelburg (yellow card) 90+6'	Report	Cáceres (yellow card) 42'; Puig 67', (yellow card) 89'; Joveljić 82'	Stadium: Geodis Park; Attendance: 28,316; Referee: Wesley Costa

March 16 4	LA Galaxy	3–3	St. Louis City SC	Carson, California
7:30 p.m. PDT	Joveljić 3'; Cáceres (yellow card) 35', (red card) 90+9'; Paintsil (yellow card) 45+1', (goal) 51'; Puig (yellow card) 65'; Yoshida 90+5'	Report	Ostrák 27'; Jackson (yellow card) 51'; Nilsson 61', (yellow card) 70'; Adeniran (yellow card) 83'; McCarthy 89' (o.g.)	Stadium: Dignity Health Sports Park; Attendance: 25,174; Referee: Atahan Yaya

March 23 5	Sporting Kansas City	2–3	LA Galaxy	Kansas City, Kansas
5:30 p.m. PDT	Radoja 34'; Agada 45+3'; Thommy (yellow card) 53'; Leibold (yellow card) 69'	Report	Zavaleta 72'; Joveljić 75'; Delgado 80'; Brugman (yellow card) 88'	Stadium: Children's Mercy Park; Attendance: 18,102; Referee: Aleksandar Zhelyazkov

March 30 6	LA Galaxy	1–0	Seattle Sounders FC	Carson, California
7:30 p.m. PDT	Pec 4'	Report	Roldán (yellow card) 60'; Ruidíaz (yellow card) 68'; Nouhou (yellow card) 90+3'	Stadium: Dignity Health Sports Park; Attendance: 22,736; Referee: Ismail Elfath

=== April ===
April 6 7	Los Angeles FC	2–1	LA Galaxy	Los Angeles, California
4:30 p.m. PDT	Tillman 4', (yellow card) 21'; Bouanga 35' (pen.); Murillo (yellow card) 44'; Hollingshead (yellow card) 61'; Palencia (yellow card) 75'	Report	Aude 29'	Stadium: BMO Stadium; Attendance: 22,321; Referee: Jon Freemon

April 13 8	Vancouver Whitecaps FC	1–3	LA Galaxy	Vancouver, British Columbia
7:30 p.m. PDT	Cubas (yellow card) 20'; Veselinović (yellow card) 45+2'; Ahmed (yellow card) 54'; White 77', (yellow card) 85'	Report	Yamane (yellow card) 25'; Joveljić 56'; Paintsil 80'; Fagúndez 82'	Stadium: BC Place; Attendance: 25,026; Referee: Ismir Pekmic

April 21 9	LA Galaxy	4–3	San Jose Earthquakes	Carson, California
5:15 p.m. PDT	Paintsil (yellow card) 7', (goal) 24' (pen.); Pec 14'; Yoshida 30'; Puig 56', (yellow card) 70'; Zavaleta (red card) 70'	Report	Rodrigues 32'; Espinoza (yellow card) 45'; Gruezo (yellow card) 54'; Kikanović 58'; Vítor Costa (yellow card) 65'; Ebobisse 72' (pen.); Skahan (yellow card) 76'	Stadium: Dignity Health Sports Park; Attendance: 25,335; Referee: Rosendo Mendoza
Note: Greg Vanney got a yellow card at (yellow card) 90+1'

April 27 10	Austin FC	2–0	LA Galaxy	Austin, Texas
10:30 a.m. PDT	Rubio 7'; Obrian 19', (yellow card) 27'; Pereira (yellow card) 44'; Valencia (yellow card) 89'	Report	Cáceres (yellow card) 9'; Puig (yellow card) 22'	Stadium: Q2 Stadium; Attendance: 20,738; Referee: Victor Rivas

=== May ===
May 5 11	Seattle Sounders FC	0–0	LA Galaxy	Seattle, Washington
3:45 p.m. PDT	Morris (yellow card) 75'	Report	Paintsil (yellow card) 81'; Cerrillo (yellow card) 83'	Stadium: Lumen Field; Attendance: 31,102; Referee: Drew Fischer

May 11 12	LA Galaxy	2–2	Real Salt Lake	Carson, California
7:30 p.m. PDT	Aude (yellow card) 18'; Pec 54'; Berry 90+4'	Report	Arango 20', 40'; Crooks (yellow card) 23'	Stadium: Dignity Health Sports Park; Attendance: 25,220; Referee: Rubiel Vazquez

May 15 13	Minnesota United FC	2–2	LA Galaxy	Saint Paul, Minnesota
5:30 p.m. PDT	Hlongwane 30'; Oluwaseyi (yellow card) 45'; Rosales (yellow card) 58'; Arriaga 80'	Report	Joveljić 61'; Fagúndez 68', (yellow card) 90+6'	Stadium: Allianz Field; Attendance: 18,722; Referee: Lukasz Szpala

May 18 14	Charlotte FC	0–0	LA Galaxy	Charlotte, North Carolina
4:30 p.m. PDT	Dejaegere (yellow card) 31'; Bronico (yellow card) 82'	Report	Aude (yellow card) 29'	Stadium: Bank of America Stadium; Attendance: 29,099; Referee: Joe Dickerson

May 25 15	LA Galaxy	2–1	Houston Dynamo FC	Carson, California
7:30 p.m. PDT	Pec 44'; Puig 59'; Brugman (yellow card) 90+4'	Report	Blessing 18'	Stadium: Dignity Health Sports Park; Attendance: 21,707; Referee: Allen Chapman

May 29 16	LA Galaxy	3–1	FC Dallas	Carson, California
7:30 p.m. PDT	Joveljić 4', 66' (pen.); Yoshida (yellow card) 89'; Puig 90+4'	Report	Delgado (yellow card) 19', (goal) 22'; Tafari (yellow card) 34' (yellow-red card) 82'; Arriola (yellow card) 35'; Farfan (yellow card) 45+4'	Stadium: Dignity Health Sports Park; Attendance: 19,505; Referee: Filip Dujic

=== June ===
June 1 17	Chicago Fire FC	2–1	LA Galaxy	Chicago, Illinois
5:30 p.m. PDT	Pineda (yellow card) 29'; Cuypers 32'; Gutiérrez 61'; Hebers (yellow card) 75'; Arigoni (yellow card) 90+5'	Report	Puig 7'; Cerrillo (yellow card) 45+4'; Cuevas (yellow card) 77'	Stadium: Soldier Field; Attendance: 25,237; Referee: Marcos DeOliveira II

June 15 18	LA Galaxy	4–2	Sporting Kansas City	Carson, California
7:30 p.m. PDT	Joveljić 40', (yellow card) 44'; Neal (yellow card) 49'; Pec 54'; Paintsil (yellow card) 68', (goal) 75'; Berry 90+2'	Report	Afrifa 66'; Castellanos 82'; Davis (yellow card) 90+3'	Stadium: Dignity Health Sports Park; Attendance: 22,198; Referee: Chris Penso

June 19 19	LA Galaxy	2–0	New York City FC	Carson, California
7:30 p.m. PDT	Neal (yellow card) 19'; Aude (yellow card) 29'; Joveljić 41'; Fagúndez 49'; Delgado (yellow card) 62'	Report	Rodríguez (yellow card) 31'; Wolf (yellow card) 45+1'	Stadium: Dignity Health Sports Park; Attendance: 20,043; Referee: Rubiel Vazquez

June 22 20	Real Salt Lake	0–1	LA Galaxy	Sandy, Utah
7:30 p.m. PDT	Oviedo (yellow card) 55'; Gómez (yellow card) 78'	Report	Yamane (yellow card) 59'; Pec 74'	Stadium: America First Field; Attendance: 21,570; Referee: Jair Marrufo

June 29 21	San Jose Earthquakes	0–3	LA Galaxy	Stanford, California
7:30 p.m. PDT	Rodrigues (yellow card) 45+3'	Report	Delgado (yellow card) 22'; Cerrillo (yellow card) 29'; Paintsil 37'; Neal (yellow card) 39'; Joveljić 72'; McCarthy (yellow card) 75'; Cuevas 90+1'	Stadium: Stanford Stadium; Attendance: 40,844; Referee: Guido Gonzales Jr.

=== July ===
July 4 22	LA Galaxy	1–2	Los Angeles FC	Pasadena, California
7:30 p.m. PDT	Cerrillo (yellow card) 22'; Pec 56'; Puig (yellow card) 90+1'	Report	Kamara 39'; Bouanga 44' (pen.); Tillman (yellow card) 63'	Stadium: Rose Bowl; Attendance: 70,076; Referee: Drew Fischer

July 7 23	LA Galaxy	2–1	Minnesota United FC	Carson, California
7:30 p.m. PDT	Nelson (yellow card) 20'; Piug (yellow card) 22'; Pec 25', 90'	Report	Pukki 73'; Bin Jeong (yellow card) 89'	Stadium: Dignity Health Sports Park; Attendance: 19,302; Referee: Pierre-Luc Lauziere

July 13 24	FC Dallas	2–0	LA Galaxy	Frisco, Texas
5:30 p.m. PDT	Musa 28'; Farrington 55'	Report		Stadium: Toyota Stadium; Attendance: 19,096; Referee: Ramy Touchan

July 17 25	LA Galaxy	3–2	Colorado Rapids	Carson, California
7:30 p.m. PDT	Fagúndez 12'; Paintsil 38'; Puig 43'; Cerrillo (yellow card) 67'	Report	Maxsø (yellow card) 8'; Cabral 32'; Bassett 45+10'; Löffelsend (yellow card) 46'; Bombito (yellow card) 71'	Stadium: Dignity Health Sports Park; Attendance: 19,488; Referee: Ismir Pekmic

July 20 26	LA Galaxy	3–2	Portland Timbers	Carson, California
7:45 p.m. PDT	Pec 38'; Puig 48'; Paintsil 58'; Nelson (yellow card) 90'; Berry (yellow card) 90+6'	Report	Evander (yellow card) 14'; Chará (yellow card) 42'; Rodríguez 52', (yellow card) 90+9'; Župarić (yellow card) 62'; Moreno 73'; Miller (yellow card) 90+5'	Stadium: Dignity Health Sports Park; Attendance: 23,586; Referee: Sergii Boiko

=== August ===
August 24 27	LA Galaxy	2–0	Atlanta United FC	Carson, California
7:30 p.m. PDT	Paintsil (yellow card) 46'; Puig (yellow card) 71', (goal) 76'; Reus 84'	Report	Fortune (yellow card) 65'	Stadium: Dignity Health Sports Park; Attendance: 25,174; Referee: Rubiel Vazquez

=== September ===
September 1 28	St. Louis City SC	2–1	LA Galaxy	St. Louis, Missouri
11:30 a.m. PDT	Teuchert 9', (yellow card) 38'; Horn (yellow card) 53'; Hartel 68'; Durkin (yellow card) 74'; Klauss (yellow card) 81'	Report	Pec 46'; Paintsil (yellow card) 90+3'	Stadium: CityPark; Attendance: 22,423; Referee: Joe Dickerson

September 14 29	LA Galaxy	4–2	Los Angeles FC	Carson, California
7:30 p.m. PDT	Fagúndez (yellow card) 34'; Neal (yellow card) 37'; Pec (yellow card) 49'; Joveljić 53', 67'; Cerrillo 55', (yellow card) 89'; Puig 86', (yellow card) 86'	Report	Bogusz 4'; Bouanga 15'; Sánchez (yellow card) 45+3'; Long (yellow card) 71'; O'Brien (red card) 79'	Stadium: Dignity Health Sports Park; Attendance: 25,174; Referee: Ted Unkel

September 18 30	Portland Timbers	4–2	LA Galaxy	Portland, Oregon
7:30 p.m. PDT	Župarić (yellow card) 13'; Rodríguez 18'; Evander 39', 51'; Crépeau (yellow card) 45'; Ayala (yellow card) 52'; Mora 80'	Report	Brugman (yellow card) 45+2'; Pec 45+3'; Paintsil 59'; Yoshida (yellow card) 82'	Stadium: Providence Park; Referee: Timothy Ford

September 21 31	LA Galaxy	4–2	Vancouver Whitecaps FC	Carson, California
7:30 p.m. PDT	Pec 32'; Berhalter 50' (o.g.); Paintsil 69'; Piug 90+3'	Report	Berhalter (yellow card) 8'; White 63'; Armstrong (yellow card) 86'; Vite (yellow card) 88'; Adekugbe 90+7'	Stadium: Dignity Health Sports Park; Attendance: 25,387; Referee: Jair Marrufo

=== October ===
October 2 32	Colorado Rapids	1–3	LA Galaxy	Commerce City, Colorado
6:30 p.m. PDT	Ronan 45'; Mihailovic (yellow card) 61'	Report	Pec 50'; Puig 58', 90+1'; Delgado (yellow card) 73'	Stadium: Dick's Sporting Goods Park; Attendance: 15,196; Referee: Pierre-Luc Lauziere

October 5 33	LA Galaxy	2–1	Austin FC	Carson, California
7:30 p.m. PDT	Brugman (yellow card) 8'; Puig (yellow card) 14'; Pec 31'; Delgado (yellow card) 60'; Mićović (yellow card) 62'; Joveljić 76', (yellow card) 90+5'; Cerrillo (yellow card) 90+11'	Report	Hines-Ike (yellow card) 26'; Pereira (yellow card) 31'; Cascante (yellow card) 50'; Driussi 55'; Wolff (yellow card) 87'; Biro (red card) 90+13'	Stadium: Dignity Health Sports Park; Attendance: 26,574; Referee: Ted Unkel

October 19 34	Houston Dynamo FC	2–1	LA Galaxy	Houston, Texas
6:00 p.m. PDT	Bassi (yellow card) 10'; Ponce 44'; Raines (yellow card) 90+6'; Steres 90+11'	Report	Paintsil (yellow card) 55'; Pec 90+6' (pen.)	Stadium: Shell Energy Stadium; Attendance: 20,800; Referee: Rosendo Mendoza

=== MLS Cup playoffs ===
==== Round One ====
October 25 Game 1	LA Galaxy	5–0	Colorado Rapids	Carson, California
8:00 p.m. PDT	Joveljić 32', 75'; Nelson 52'; Puig 54', 87'	Report	Navarro (yellow card) 37'; Cannon (yellow card) 40'; Abubaker (yellow card) 49'	Stadium: Dignity Health Sports Park; Attendance: 24,537; Referee: Lukasz Szpala

November 1 Game 2	Colorado Rapids	1–4	LA Galaxy	Commerce City, Colorado
6:30 p.m. PDT	Abubaker (yellow card) 3'; Larraz 19'; Cannon (yellow card) 85'	Report	Pec 8'; Paintsil 45+3'; Cerrillo (yellow card) 72'; Nelson (yellow card) 90'; Puig 90+1', 90+4'	Stadium: Dick's Sporting Goods Park; Attendance: 16,010; Referee: Victor Rivas
Note: LA Galaxy won the series 2–0.

LA Galaxy advances with a 2–0 record.

==== Conference semifinals ====
November 24 Conference Semifinals	LA Galaxy	6–2	Minnesota United FC	Carson, California
3:15 p.m. PST	Pec 1', 50'; Joveljic 18', 89'; Paintsil 37', (yellow card) 45', (goal) 86'; Puig (yellow card) 58'; Delgado (yellow card) 90+4'	Report	Yeboah 6', 45+4' (pen.); Hlongwane (yellow card) 53'; Dotson (yellow card) 62'; Díaz (yellow card) 68' (yellow-red card) 82'	Stadium: Dignity Health Sports Park; Attendance: 26,192; Referee: Rosendo Mendoza

==== Conference Finals ====
November 30 Conference Finals	LA Galaxy	1–0	Seattle Sounders FC	Carson, California
7:00 p.m. PST	Joveljic 85'	Report	de la Vega (yellow card) 55'; C. Roldan (yellow card) 61'; Nouhou (yellow card) 74'; Ragen (yellow card) 90+6'	Stadium: Dignity Health Sports Park; Attendance: 26,327; Referee: Drew Fischer

==== MLS Cup 2024 ====
December 7, 2024 Final	LA Galaxy	2–1	New York Red Bulls	Carson, California
1:00 p.m. PST	Paintsil 9'; Joveljić 13'; Delgado (yellow card) 38'	Report	S. Nealis 28'; Eile (yellow card) 35'; Harper (yellow card) 71'	Stadium: Dignity Health Sports Park; Attendance: 26,812; Referee: Guido Gonzales Jr.

=== U.S. Open Cup ===
LA Galaxy was not sent to the tournament, but their MLS Next Pro team LA Galaxy II was sent instead following the deal reached on March 1, 2024.

=== Leagues Cup ===
==== Group Stage (West 2) ====
Pos	Team	Pld	W	PW	PL	L	GF	GA	GD	Pts	Qualification	LAX	SJE	GUA
1	(United States Soccer Federation) LA Galaxy	2	1	1	0	0	4	3	+1	5	Advance to knockout stage	—	—	—
2	(United States Soccer Federation) San Jose Earthquakes	2	0	1	0	1	2	3	−1	2	Advance to knockout stage	1–2	—	—
3	(Mexican Football Federation) Guadalajara	2	0	0	2	0	3	3	0	2		2–2	1–1	—

Source: Leagues Cup
Rules for classification: Tiebreakers

July 31 Group stage	San Jose Earthquakes (United States)	1–2	(United States) LA Galaxy	San Jose, California
7:30 p.m. PDT	Espinoza (yellow card) 56'; Ebobisse 75'	Report	Fagúndez 41'; Nelson (yellow card) 60'; Yoshida (yellow card) 82'; Berry 89'; Yamane (yellow card) 90+6'	Stadium: PayPal Park; Attendance: 12,554; Referee: Lukasz Szpala

August 4 Group stage	Guadalajara (Mexico)	2–2 (4–5 p)	(United States) LA Galaxy	Carson, California
7:30 p.m. PDT	Mozo 8'; Briseño (yellow card) 13'; Martin (yellow card) 45+3'; González (yellow card) 45+3'; Sepúlveda (yellow card) 80'; Cowell 90+1'; Olivas (yellow card) 90+4'	Report	Painstsil 11'; Cáceres (yellow card) 45+3'; Pec 67'	Stadium: Dignity Health Sports Park; Attendance: 25,174; Referee: Pierre-Luc Lauziere
	Penalties
	Cowell (penalty scored); Mozo (penalty scored); Alvarado (penalty scored); Govea (penalty missed); Gutiérrez (penalty scored); Sepúlveda (penalty missed)		(penalty scored) Pec; (penalty missed) Fagúndez; (penalty scored) Delgado; (penalty scored) Paintsil; (penalty scored) Puig; (penalty scored) Yamane

==== Knockout stage ====
August 8 Round of 32	Seattle Sounders FC (United States)	3–1	(United States) LA Galaxy	Seattle, Washington
7:30 p.m. PDT	Yeimar 4'; Ragen 7', (yellow card) 45'; João Paulo (yellow card) 19'; Roldan 45+4'; Rothrock (yellow card) 52'; Vargas (yellow card) 66'; Baker-Whiting (yellow card) 84'	Report	Cerrillo (yellow card) 44'; Puig (yellow card) 80'; Pec 83'; Paintsil (yellow card) 90+2'	Stadium: Lumen Field; Attendance: 17,242; Referee: Lukasz Szpala
