= Matheus Nascimento =

Matheus Nascimento may refer to:

- Matheus (footballer, born 1983), Brazilian footballer
- Matheus Nascimento (footballer, born 2004), Brazilian footballer
