= Edwin Cerrillo =

American soccer player

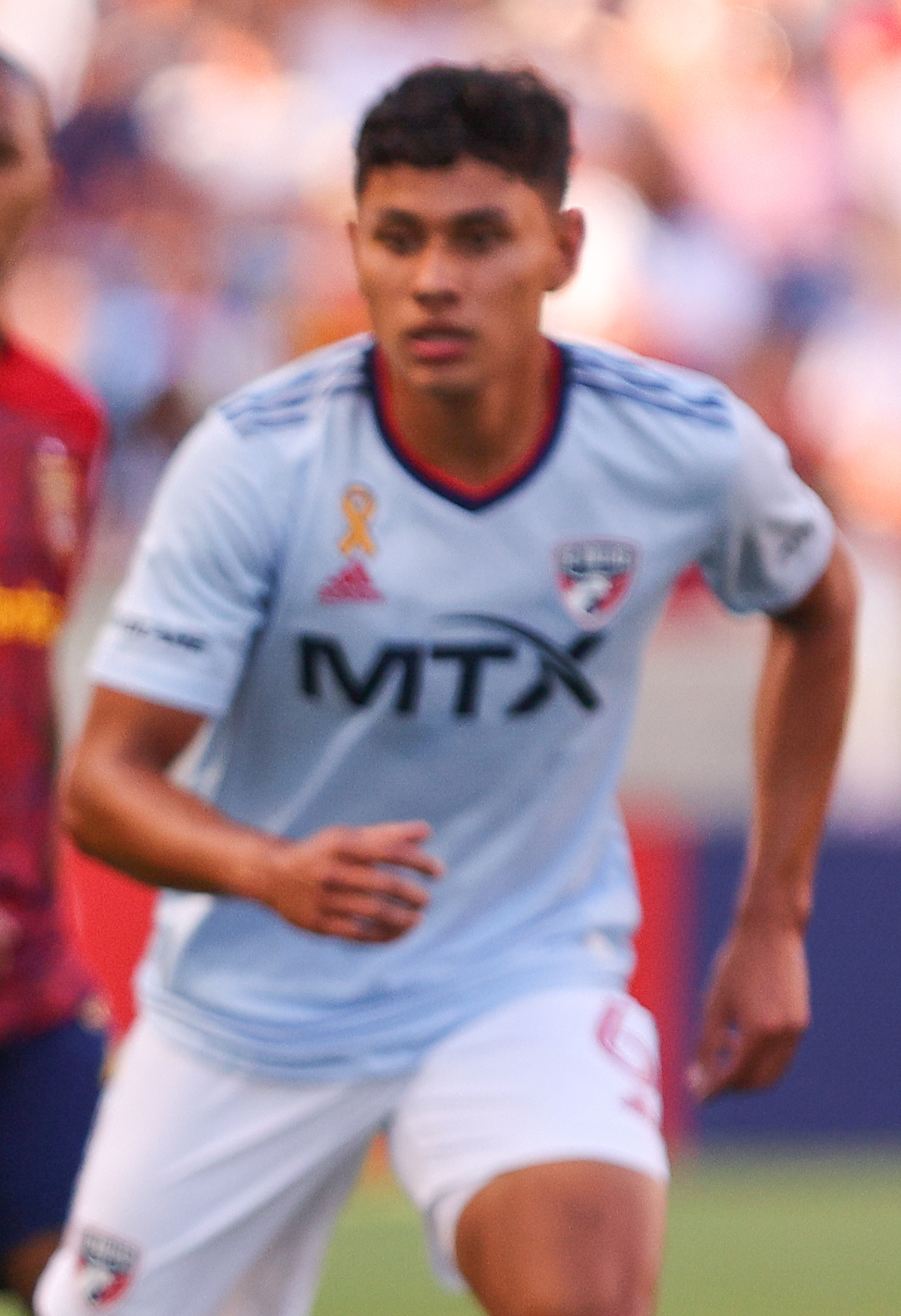
- Cerrillo with FC Dallas in 2021

Personal information
- Full name: Edwin Javier Cerrillo
- Date of birth: October 3, 2000 (age 26)
- Place of birth: Waco, Texas, United States
- Height: 5 ft 9 in (1.75 m)
- Position: Defensive midfielder

Team information
- Current team: América
- Number: 6

Youth career
- 2015–2018: FC Dallas

Senior career*
Years	Team	Apps	(Gls)
2019–2023	FC Dallas	89	(0)
2019–2021	→ North Texas SC	15	(1)
2023–2026	LA Galaxy	97	(1)
2026–	América	10	(0)

International career
2019	United States U20	1	(0)
2019	United States U23	1	(0)
- * Club domestic league appearances and goals as of November 21, 2026

Edwin Javier Cerrillo (born October 3, 2000) is an American professional soccer player who plays as a defensive midfielder for Liga MX club América.

== Early life ==
Born in Waco, Texas, Cerrillo is of Mexican descent.

== Youth career ==
Cerrillo joined the FC Dallas academy in 2015, scoring 12 goals in 71 games throughout all levels.

== Club career ==
Cerrillo committed to playing college soccer at the University of Maryland, but opted to sign a Homegrown Player contract with Major League Soccer side FC Dallas on February 14, 2019. He made his professional debut as a 79th-minute substitute in a 2–0 win over LA Galaxy on March 9, 2019. On August 23, 2020, Cerrillo scored his first professional goal while on loan to North Texas SC.

On August 3, 2023, Cerrillo was traded to LA Galaxy in exchange for up to $600,000 in General Allocation Money, with $200,000 guaranteed and $400,000 that's conditional on performance metrics. Dallas also retained a sell-on percentage.

In August 2026, Cerrillo was transferred to América in Mexico's top division.

== International career ==
Cerrillo was called up on the back of good league form to the 2019 FIFA U-20 World Cup; although, he did not play in that tournament. He was subsequently called up to the United States national under-23 team for a camp later during the 2019 MLS season. He is also eligible to play for Mexico.

== Career statistics ==
=== Club ===
As of match played on November 21, 2026

Club	Season	League			National cup		Continental		Other		Total	
Club	Season	Division	Apps	Goals	Apps	Goals	Apps	Goals	Apps	Goals	Apps	Goals
FC Dallas	2019	MLS	13	0	2	0	—		—		15	0
FC Dallas	2020	MLS	2	0	—		—		—		2	0
FC Dallas	2021	MLS	22	0	—		—		—		22	0
FC Dallas	2022	MLS	33	0	2	0	—		—		35	0
FC Dallas	2023	MLS	19	0	1	0	—		2 (Note: Appearance(s) in Leagues Cup)	0	22	0
FC Dallas	Total		89	0	5	0	—		2	0	96	0
North Texas SC (loan)	2019	USL League One	7	0	—		—		—		7	0
North Texas SC (loan)	2020	USL League One	7	1	—		—		—		7	1
North Texas SC (loan)	2021	USL League One	1	0	—		—		—		1	0
North Texas SC (loan)	Total		15	1	—		—		—		15	1
LA Galaxy	2023	MLS	11	0	—		—		—		11	0
LA Galaxy	2024	MLS	38	1	—		—		3	0	41	1
LA Galaxy	2025	MLS	32	0	—		4 (Note: Appearances in CONCACAF Champions Cup)	0	7 (Note: One appearance in Campeones Cup and six in Leagues Cup)	0	43	0
LA Galaxy	2026	MLS	16	0	—		6	0	—		22	0
LA Galaxy	Total		97	1	—		10	0	10	0	117	1
América	2026–27	Liga MX	10	0	—		—		2	0	12	0
Career Total			211	1	5	0	10	0	14	0	240	1

== Honors ==
North Texas SC

- USL League One Regular Season Title: 2019
- USL League One Championship: 2019

LA Galaxy

- MLS Cup: 2024
