= Gabriel Pec =

Brazilian footballer (born 2001)

Personal information
- Full name: Gabriel Fortes Chaves
- Date of birth: 11 February 2001 (age 25)
- Place of birth: Petrópolis, Brazil
- Height: 1.74 m (5 ft 9 in)
- Positions: Winger; attacking midfielder

Team information
- Current team: Cruzeiro
- Number: 77

Youth career
- 2009–2021: Vasco da Gama

Senior career*
Years	Team	Apps	(Gls)
2019–2023	Vasco da Gama	168	(25)
2024–2026	LA Galaxy	76	(27)
2026–	Cruzeiro	0	(0)
- * Club domestic league appearances and goals as of 8 July 2026

Gabriel Fortes Chaves (born 11 February 2001), known as Gabriel Pec, is a Brazilian professional footballer who plays as a winger or attacking midfielder for Campeonato Brasileiro Série A club Cruzeiro.

== Career ==
=== Vasco da Gama ===
Pec joined the youth academy of Vasco da Gama in 2009. Pec made his professional debut for Vasco da Gama in a 2–0 Campeonato Brasileiro Série A loss to EC Bahia on 7 September 2019.

In 2023, in the debut of the 2023 Campeonato Brasileiro Série A for Vasco da Gama against Atlético Mineiro, Pec participated in the two goals of Vasco da Gama winning 2–1 against Atlético Mineiro. In the 23rd round, a valid game against Fluminense, Gabriel Pec came on in the 15th minute of the second half and received a yellow card. However, he was decisive in scoring Vasco's last two goals against Fluminense in a 4–2 victory.

=== LA Galaxy ===
On 30 January 2024, MLS club LA Galaxy announced the signing of Pec on a five-year Young Designated Player contract ahead of the 2024 season.

=== Cruzeiro ===
On 7 July 2026, Pec returned to Brazil, and signed with Cruzeiro in exchange for up to $13.5 million.

== Personal life ==
Born in Brazil, Pec is of Portuguese descent and holds dual-citizenship.

== Career statistics ==
As of match played 13 April 2025

Appearances and goals by club, season and competition
Club	Season	League			State league (Note: Includes Campeonato Carioca)		National cup (Note: Includes Copa do Brasil, U.S. Open Cup)		Continental		Other		Total	
Club	Season	Division	Apps	Goals	Apps	Goals	Apps	Goals	Apps	Goals	Apps	Goals	Apps	Goals
Vasco da Gama	2019	Série A	8	0	0	0	0	0	—		—		8	0
Vasco da Gama	2020	Série A	16	1	4	0	1	0	0	0	—		21	1
Vasco da Gama	2021	Série B	34	1	13	5	5	1	—		—		52	7
Vasco da Gama	2022	Série B	33	1	12	3	2	0	—		—		47	4
Vasco da Gama	2023	Série A	37	8	11	6	2	0	—		—		50	14
Vasco da Gama	Total		128	11	40	14	10	1	0	0	—		178	26
LA Galaxy	2024	MLS	33	16	—		0	0	—		8 (Note: Three appearances and two goals in Leagues Cup, five appearances in and three goals in MLS Cup playoffs)	5	41	21
LA Galaxy	2025	MLS	7	1	—		0	0	4 (Note: Appearances in CONCACAF Champions Cup)	1	—		11	2
LA Galaxy	Total		40	17	—		0	0	4	1	8	5	52	23
Career total			168	28	40	14	10	1	4	1	8	5	230	49

== Honours ==
Vasco da Gama

- Taça Rio: 2021

LA Galaxy

- MLS Cup: 2024
- Western Conference (MLS): 2024

Individual

- MLS All-Star: 2024
- MLS Newcomer of the Year: 2024
- CONCACAF Champions Cup Best XI: 2026
