= Matheus Nascimento (footballer, born 2004) =

Brazilian footballer

Personal information
- Full name: Matheus Nascimento de Paula
- Date of birth: 3 March 2004 (age 22)
- Place of birth: Niterói, Brazil
- Height: 1.82 m (6 ft 0 in)
- Position: Striker

Team information
- Current team: Grêmio
- Number: 30

Youth career
- 2015–2020: Botafogo

Senior career*
Years	Team	Apps	(Gls)
2020–2026	Botafogo	43	(1)
2025–2026	→ LA Galaxy (loan)	22	(4)
2026–	Grêmio	0	(0)

International career^{‡}
2019	Brazil U15	6	(4)
2022–2023	Brazil U20	3	(3)
2023	Brazil U23	4	(0)
Medal record
Men's football
Representing Brazil
Pan American Games
Winner	2023 Santiago
- * Club domestic league appearances and goals as of 04:21, 4 January 2026 (UTC) ‡ National team caps and goals as of 4 November 2023

Matheus Nascimento de Paula (born 3 March 2004) is a Brazilian professional footballer who plays as a striker for Campeonato Brasileiro Série A club Grêmio.

== Club career ==
Originally a member of the Trops youth development center (based in Niterói, Rio de Janeiro) Matheus joined Botafogo at the age of 11, thanks to a partnership between the school and the fellow Carioca club. He quickly established himself as one of the most promising prospects in the team's academy ever since, having scored more than 150 goals with several different formations.

Following his impressive performances in the youth sector, in 2020 Matheus was first introduced to Botafogo's first team during their campaign in the Campeonato Brasileiro Série A, and signed his first professional contract on 12 June, establishing his link with the club until 2023. Some months after, on 6 September, he proceeded to make his professional debut, coming in for Matheus Babi at the 80th-minute of a 2–2 away draw against Corinthians: at 16 years, 6 months and 3 days, he also became the youngest player ever to get on the pitch for the Rio-based team.

Although he eventually got involved in Botafogo's third relegation to the Série B, Matheus still managed to get his first feature in the starting XI, as well: in fact, as Alexander Lecaros got ruled out after testing positive for COVID-19, on 20 January 2021, Matheus was chosen to start the home match against Atlético Goianiense, which ended in a 3–1 loss for his side.

On 19 February 2025, Major League Soccer club LA Galaxy signed Nascimento on a season-long loan with a purchase option. On 14 June, Nascimento scored his first goal for the team in a 3–3 draw with St. Louis City SC through an assist from Marco Reus. At the conclusion of the season, the Galaxy entered discussions to resign him for the 2026 season.

== Career statistics ==
As of 19 October 2025

Appearances and goals by club, season and competition
Club	Season	League			State league		National cup		Continental		Other		Total	
Club	Season	Division	Apps	Goals	Apps	Goals	Apps	Goals	Apps	Goals	Apps	Goals	Apps	Goals
Botafogo	2020	Série A	11	0	—		—		—		—		11	0
Botafogo	2021	Série B	3	0	10 (Note: Appearances in Campeonato Carioca)	1	2	0	—		—		15	1
Botafogo	2022	Série A	23	0	10	5	4	2	—		—		37	7
Botafogo	2023	Série A	5	1	10	1	3	1	1 (Note: Appearances in Copa Sudamericana)	0	—		18	3
Botafogo	2024	Série A	1	0	5	1	0	0	2 (Note: Appearances in Copa Libertadores)	0	—		7	1
Botafogo	Total		43	1	35	8	9	3	3	0	—		88	12
LA Galaxy (loan)	2025	Major League Soccer	22	4	—		—		1 (Note: Appearance in CONCACAF Champions Cup)	0	5 (Note: Four appearances and three goals in Leagues Cup, one appearance in Campeones Cup)	3	28	7
Career total			65	5	35	8	9	3	4	0	5	3	90	12

== Honours ==
Botafogo

- Campeonato Brasileiro Série B: 2021
- Taça Rio: 2023, 2024
- Copa Libertadores: 2024
- Campeonato Brasileiro Série A: 2024

Brazil U23

- Pan American Games: 2023
