= Tucker Lepley =

American soccer player (born 2002)

Personal information
- Full name: Tucker Lee Erman Lepley
- Date of birth: January 17, 2002 (age 24)
- Place of birth: Charlotte, North Carolina, United States
- Height: 1.70 m (5 ft 7 in)
- Position: Midfielder

Team information
- Current team: Oakland Roots SC (on loan from LA Galaxy)

Youth career
- 2015–2018: Charlotte Soccer Academy
- 2018–2020: Sporting Kansas City

College career
Years	Team	Apps	(Gls)
2020–2023	UCLA Bruins	45	(11)

Senior career*
Years	Team	Apps	(Gls)
2019	Swope Park Rangers	10	(0)
2024–	LA Galaxy	19	(0)
2024–2026	→ Ventura County FC (loan)	23	(1)
2026	→ Oakland Roots SC (loan)	18	(1)
- * Club domestic league appearances and goals as of November 10, 2026

Tucker Lee Erman Lepley (born January 17, 2002) is an American professional soccer player who plays for Oakland Roots SC of the USL Championship on loan from Major League Soccer club LA Galaxy.

== Career ==
Lepley played with USL Championship side Swope Park Rangers during their 2019 season from Sporting Kansas City's academy. He made his first professional appearance on July 20, 2019, as an 83rd-minute substitute during a 4–0 loss to Ottawa Fury.

In 2020, Lepley began playing college soccer at the University of California, Los Angeles.

Los Angeles Galaxy drafted Lepley in the third round (62 overall) of the 2024 MLS SuperDraft. He signed with LA Galaxy on February 23, 2024.

On May 7th, 2026 Oakland Roots SC announced they had acquired Lepley on loan from LA Galaxy for the remainder of the 2026 USL Championship season.

== Internet presence ==
On February 3, 2024, a brief interview of Lepley was uploaded to the official LA Galaxy YouTube channel. Lepley also has his own channel on the website where he posts highlight reels of his plays.

== Honors ==
- LA Galaxy : MLS Cup 2024
- NCAA Third-Team All-American: 2023
