= Novak Mićović =

Serbian footballer (born 2001)

Personal information
- Full name: Novak Mićović
- Date of birth: 25 October 2001 (age 25)
- Place of birth: Belgrade, FR Yugoslavia
- Height: 1.90 m (6 ft 3 in)
- Position: Goalkeeper

Team information
- Current team: LA Galaxy
- Number: 1

Youth career
- –2020: Čukarički

Senior career*
Years	Team	Apps	(Gls)
2020–2023	Čukarički	30	(0)
2020	→ IMT (loan)	11	(0)
2023–	LA Galaxy	4	(0)
2023	→ LA Galaxy II (loan)	5	(0)
- * Club domestic league appearances and goals as of 1 April 2023

Novak Mićović (Serbian Cyrillic: Новак Мићовић; born 25 October 2001) is a Serbian professional footballer who plays as a goalkeeper for Major League Soccer club LA Galaxy.

== Career statistics ==
As of 4 August 2024

Appearances and goals by club, season and competition
Club	Season	League			National cup		Continental		Other		Total	
Club	Season	Division	Apps	Goals	Apps	Goals	Apps	Goals	Apps	Goals	Apps	Goals
Čukarički	2018–19	Serbian SuperLiga	0	0	0	0	—		—		0	0
Čukarički	2019–20	Serbian SuperLiga	0	0	0	0	0	0	—		0	0
Čukarički	2020–21	Serbian SuperLiga	2	0	—		—		—		2	0
Čukarički	2021–22	Serbian SuperLiga	14	0	1	0	0	0	—		15	0
Čukarički	2022–23	Serbian SuperLiga	14	0	2	0	3	0	—		19	0
Čukarički	Total		30	0	3	0	3	0	—		36	0
IMT (loan)	2020–21	Serbian First League	11	0	2	0	—		—		13	0
LA Galaxy (loan)	2023	Major League Soccer	2	0	0	0	—		2	0	4	0
LA Galaxy	2024	Major League Soccer	2	0	—		—		2	0	4	0
LA Galaxy	Total		4	0	0	0	—		4	0	8	0
LA Galaxy II (loan)	2023	MLS Next Pro	5	0	—		—		—		5	0
Career total			50	0	5	0	3	0	4	0	62	0

== Honours ==
LA Galaxy

- MLS Cup: 2024
