= MLS Cup 2024 =

2024 edition of the MLS Cup

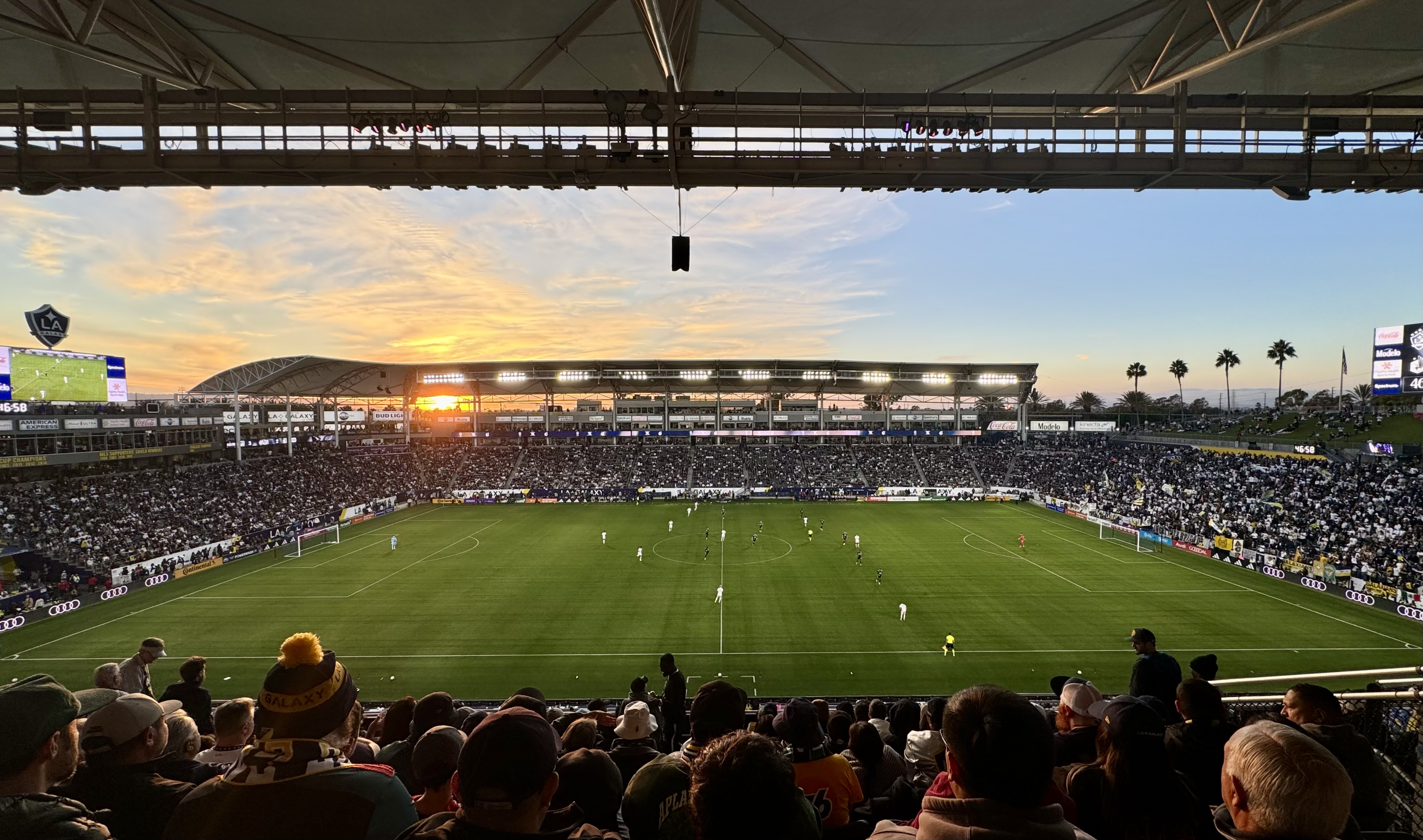
- Dignity Health Sports Park, the host venue of MLS Cup 2024
- Event: MLS Cup
LA Galaxy	New York Red Bulls
2	1
- Date: December 7, 2024
- Venue: Dignity Health Sports Park; Carson, California
- MLS Cup MVP: Gastón Brugman (LA Galaxy)
- Referee: Guido Gonzales Jr.
- Attendance: 26,812
- Weather: Sunny, 81 °F (27 °C)

MLS Cup 2024 was the 29th edition of the MLS Cup, the championship match of Major League Soccer (MLS), the top-flight soccer league in the United States and Canada. The match was played on December 7, 2024, at Dignity Health Sports Park in Carson, California, United States. It was contested by the Western Conference champions LA Galaxy and the Eastern Conference champions New York Red Bulls and determined the champions of the 2024 season. The match also marked the conclusion of the MLS Cup playoffs, which was contested by the top 18 teams based on their regular season records.

The LA Galaxy won 2–1 and clinched a record-extending sixth MLS Cup title with two goals in the first half. Galaxy midfielder Gastón Brugman was named the match's most valuable player.

== Road to the final ==
The MLS Cup is the post-season championship of Major League Soccer (MLS), the top-flight club soccer league in the United States and Canada. The 2024 season was the 29th in MLS history, and was contested by 29 teams organized into the eastern and western conferences. Each team played 34 matches during the regular season, which runs from February to October, twice against each intra-conference opponent and six to seven times for inter-conference opposition in an unbalanced schedule. The regular season included a month-long break for the Leagues Cup, which comprised all MLS and Liga MX teams. The nine clubs in each conference with the most points qualified for the MLS Cup playoffs, which was played over five rounds from October to December. Most rounds were a single-elimination match hosted by the higher-seeded team; the exception was Round One, which was a best-of-three series with the first and third (if necessary) match hosted by the higher-seeded team.

Both of the finalists, the LA Galaxy and New York Red Bulls, were among the ten original teams that joined the league for the inaugural season in 1996. The 2024 final is the first MLS Cup to not feature an expansion team since MLS Cup 2014, which was contested by the Galaxy and New England Revolution. It is also the first championship match between teams from New York City and Los Angeles—the two largest metropolitan areas in the United States. The metropolitan areas also each have two MLS teams, with their newer counterparts established in the 2010s having each won the MLS Cup. The Galaxy and Red Bulls last played each other during the 2021 regular season, which ended in a 3–2 victory for the Galaxy.

=== LA Galaxy ===
The LA Galaxy are the most successful team in MLS Cup history, having won five titles in nine appearances in the final; their most recent was in 2014 against the New England Revolution, who they previously defeated in 2002 and 2005. The team had won three MLS Cup championships in a four-year span under head coach Bruce Arena, who left in 2016. In the following seven seasons, the Galaxy qualified for the playoffs only twice and finished with the worst record in the league once despite making several star signings. They finished in 26th place during the 2023 season, their worst performance in club history, and fired longtime club president Chris Klein and technical director Jovan Kirovski in response to a boycott from fans.

Head coach Greg Vanney was retained and worked with new general manager Will Kuntz to acquire 20 players over a 16-month period to overhaul the Galaxy roster; the attack would also remain under the leadership of star midfielder Riqui Puig. The club remained under transfer sanctions during the 2023 season that limited their early rebuild to free agent signings and trades. Starting goalkeeper Jonathan Bond was replaced by free agent John McCarthy, who had won MLS Cup 2022 with cross-town rivals Los Angeles FC. Two of the Galaxy's Designated Players, Javier "Chicharito" Hernández and Douglas Costa, left during the winter transfer window and were replaced by young wingers Gabriel Pec and Joseph Paintsil at a reported combined cost of $19 million in transfer fees. The moves marked a change from the club's traditional Designated Player signings, which had included veteran European stars, but aligned with other MLS teams who pursued younger talent.

The team were undefeated in their first six matches of the regular season, including two matches where they were trailing 2–0, until a loss to Los Angeles FC in the El Tráfico derby. The Galaxy's schedule included nine away matches in the first fourteen weeks of the season, which was followed by a home stand of four matches during a five-week stretch. Prior to the home stand, the team had a five-match winless streak in May that included four consecutive draws that dropped them to fourth place in the Western Conference. The Galaxy won six of their next seven matches through the end of June and tied for the top spot in the conference despite injuries to midfielders Riqui Puig and Gastón Brugman. The team entered the midseason break for the Leagues Cup atop the Western Conference standings with a record of 14 wins, 5 losses, and 7 draws.

The Galaxy advanced from their Leagues Cup group but were eliminated in the round of 32 by Seattle Sounders FC. Before MLS play resumed in late August, the team signed German midfielder Marco Reus from Borussia Dortmund; he scored in his debut match for the club, a 2–0 defeat of Atlanta United FC that was also the 400th win in franchise history. The Galaxy had a pair of losses on the road in September, but clinched a playoff spot and remained atop the conference standings. The team lost on Decision Day to Houston Dynamo FC and ended the regular season tied on points with Los Angeles FC, but finished second in the conference on goal differential. The Galaxy finished with an undefeated record at their primary home stadium, Dignity Health Sports Park, and equaled their franchise records for wins (19) and goals scored (69) in the season. Pec, who was awarded Newcomer of the Year, led the team in scoring with 16 goals and 14 assists, followed by Puig with 13 goals and 15 assists; the Galaxy set an MLS record with four players who scored ten or more goals during the season.

LA played seventh-seeded Colorado Rapids in the first round of the playoffs, a best-of-three series. The Galaxy won 5–0 in the first matched, played at home, and 4–1 in the second match at the Rapids' home stadium. The two-match sweep gave the team a three-week break until the next playoff match, which Puig criticized in a tweet directed at the league. In the Conference Semifinals, the Galaxy hosted Minnesota United FC and won 6–2, setting an MLS record with 15 goals scored in the first three playoff games. Paintsil, Pec, and Dejan Joveljić all scored two goals each in the victory, which equaled the most goals scored in a single playoff match. LA hosted the Western Conference Final against Seattle Sounders FC, who had defeated top-seeded Los Angeles FC in the previous round and had the fewest goals conceded during the 2024 regular season. The Galaxy won 1–0 with a goal in the 85th minute by Joveljić after struggling against Seattle's defense and control of the game. The team returned to the MLS Cup final for the first time in ten years but lost Puig, who tore his anterior cruciate ligament during the match but continued to play for 30 minutes.

=== New York Red Bulls ===
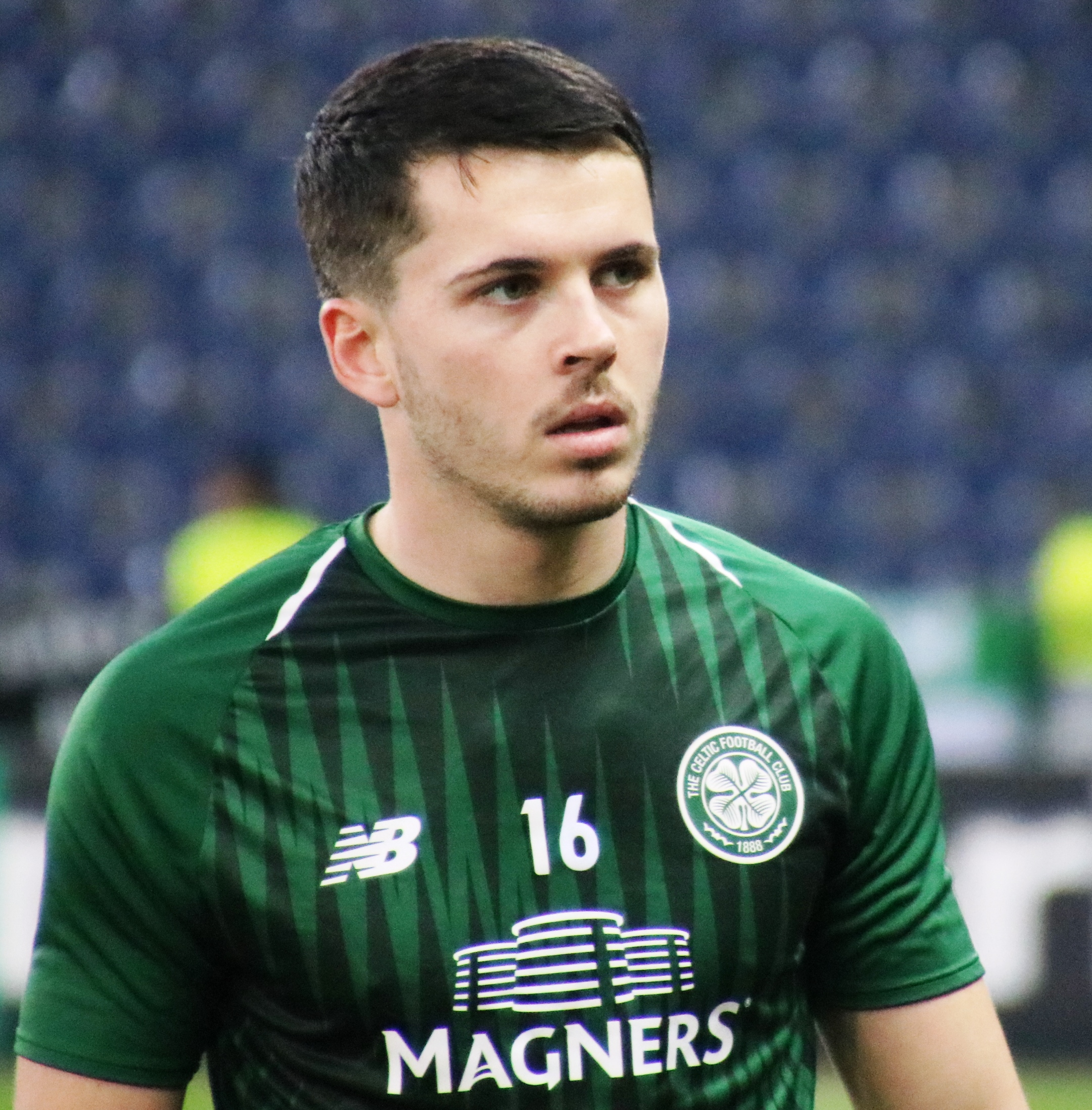
Scottish winger Lewis Morgan (pictured in 2018) led the Red Bulls in scoring during the regular season after returning from injuries in 2023

The New York Red Bulls joined MLS in the inaugural season as the MetroStars and adopted their current name after their acquisition by Austrian energy drink company Red Bull GmbH was completed in 2006. The team finished as runners-up to the Columbus Crew in MLS Cup 2008, their first championship appearance, and had yet to return to the MLS Cup. The Red Bulls had the MLS record for longest playoffs streak, having qualified for 15 consecutive seasons between 2010 and 2024. Despite their playoff struggles, the team had won the Supporters' Shield, awarded for the best regular season record, three times in a six-year stretch from 2013 to 2018. They finished the 2023 regular season as the eighth seed in the Eastern Conference and defeated Charlotte FC in the wild card round of the playoffs before being eliminated by FC Cincinnati in two matches. It was the fifth consecutive season where the Red Bulls had not advanced beyond the first round proper of the playoffs.

German manager Sandro Schwarz was hired as head coach in December 2023 from Hertha BSC in the Bundesliga; the hiring was intended to align with the "high-press" style used by the Red Bull teams. Later that month, New York signed Swedish midfielder Emil Forsberg from sister club RB Leipzig to a Designated Player contract. He was acquired to become captain of the team, which primarily relied on a core of young homegrown players from New York and New Jersey. The Red Bulls also signed Swedish defender Noah Eile and benefited from the return of Scottish winger Lewis Morgan, who missed most of the previous season with a hip injury and underwent surgery.

The Red Bulls began the regular season with 14 points in their first seven matches as they led the Eastern Conference and league standings. Through their first ten matches, the team lost only once, but also had five draws from goals conceded late in matches; by early May, they had dropped to third in the conference standings. After a 6–2 loss to Inter Miami CF in early May, the Red Bulls won four of their next five matches and maintained a fourth-place position in the conference. The team lost Forsberg to a leg injury while he was playing for the Sweden national team during an international friendly on June 8; he was placed on the injury list at the end of the month after attempting to play as a late substitute. The Red Bulls entered the Leagues Cup break on an eight-match unbeaten streak but only won twice despite outshooting their opponents—an attacking discrpency that was blamed on the absence of Forsberg.

New York finished at the bottom of their group in Leagues Cup play after losing two penalty shootouts to Toronto FC and C.F. Pachuca. During their tournament break in August, Uruguayan midfielder Felipe Carballo was acquired on loan from Grêmio in Brazil and filled the team's last remaining Designated Player slot. The Red Bulls had their 12-match home unbeaten streak in league play snapped by the Philadelphia Union and won once in their final nine matches of the regular season. Forsberg returned to the team in October as the team finished seventh in the Eastern Conference and qualified for the playoffs for the 15th consecutive season. Lewis Morgan was the top goalscorer for the Red Bulls, with 14 in MLS matches, and named the Comeback Player of the Year for his performance during the regular season.

The Red Bulls opened the playoffs with a two-match sweep of the Columbus Crew, the defending MLS Cup champions and top seed in the Eastern Conference. They earned an upset 1–0 victory in Columbus through a goal by Carballo and a shutout by goalkeeper Carlos Coronel. In the second match, the Red Bulls played to a 2–2 draw and defeated the Crew in the penalty shootout with three saves from Coronel to advance to their first Conference Semifinals since 2018. They then faced cross-town rivals New York City FC for the first time in the playoffs; the match was played at Citi Field, which was used in place of Yankee Stadium due to a scheduling conflict with the Army–Notre Dame college football game. The Red Bulls won 2–0 with goals in the first half by Carballo from a long-distance strike and Dante Vanzeir on a corner kick. The team clinched their second Eastern Conference championship with a 1–0 defeat of hosts Orlando City SC; the lone goal was a header scored by defender Andrés Reyes, while Coronel kept a shutout amid nine shots from Orlando City. The Red Bulls were the lowest-ever seed to play in an MLS Cup final and the first team since the 1998 Chicago Fire to win three consecutive road games in the MLS Cup Playoffs.

=== Summary of results ===
Note: In all results below, the score of the finalist is given first (H: home; A: away).

LA Galaxy				Round	New York Red Bulls			
2nd place in Western Conference MLS Western Conference table (2024): Pos / Team / Pld / Pts; 1 / Los Angeles FC / 34 / 64; 2 / LA Galaxy / 34 / 64; 3 / Real Salt Lake / 34 / 59; 4 / Seattle Sounders FC / 34 / 57; 5 / Houston Dynamo FC / 34 / 54; 6 / Minnesota United FC / 34 / 52; 7 / Colorado Rapids / 34 / 50; Source: MLS Qualified for playoffs Qualified for CONCACAF Champions Cup				Regular season	7th place in Eastern Conference MLS Eastern Conference table (2024): Pos / Team / Pld / Pts; 4 / Orlando City SC / 34 / 52; 5 / Charlotte FC / 34 / 51; 6 / New York City FC / 34 / 50; 7 / New York Red Bulls / 34 / 47; 8 / CF Montréal / 34 / 43; 9 / Atlanta United FC / 34 / 40; 10 / D.C. United / 34 / 40; Source: MLS Qualified for playoffs Qualified for CONCACAF Champions Cup			
Opponent (Games)	1st leg	2nd leg	3rd leg	MLS Cup Playoffs	Opponent (Games)	1st leg	2nd leg	3rd leg
Colorado Rapids (2–0)	5–0 (H)	4–1 (A)	—	Round One	Columbus Crew (2–0)	1–0 (A)	2–2 (5–4 p.) (H)	—
Opponent	Score				Opponent	Score		
Minnesota United FC	6–2 (H)			Conference Semifinals	New York City FC	2–0 (A)		
Seattle Sounders FC	1–0 (H)			Conference Finals	Orlando City SC	1–0 (A)		

== Venue ==
MLS Cup 2024 was hosted by the LA Galaxy at their home stadium Dignity Health Sports Park in Carson, California, near Los Angeles. The Galaxy won the right to host the match due to their higher finish during the 2024 regular season. Dignity Health Sports Park has 27,000 seats and is part of a multi-use sports complex on the campus of California State University, Dominguez Hills. It opened in 2003 for the Galaxy and was also home to Chivas USA, another MLS franchise, from 2005 to 2014 and the Los Angeles Chargers of the National Football League from 2017 to 2019. MLS Cup 2024 is the seventh MLS Cup final to be played at Dignity Health Sports Park; it had been selected as a neutral venue in 2003, 2004, and 2008, and the MLS Cup was hosted by the Galaxy in 2011, 2012 and 2014. It is also the ninth MLS Cup final to be played in the Los Angeles area; the Rose Bowl in Pasadena hosted MLS Cup 1998 and Banc of California Stadium in Los Angeles hosted MLS Cup 2022.

The Galaxy announced a sellout for the match on December 6. The pre-match ceremonies included a performance by rapper Warren G and a festival at Galaxy Park. Shuttle buses to Dignity Health Sports Park were offered from Del Amo station and the Harbor Gateway Transit Center before and after the match. The New York Red Bulls acquired 2,000 tickets and distributed them to team staff, supporters' groups, and season-ticket holders. The team also provided a $300 travel stipend for 700 members of the supporters' groups.

== Broadcasting ==
The MLS Cup final was broadcast worldwide for free in English and Spanish on MLS Season Pass, a subscription streaming service operated by Apple under their Apple TV+ brand. The English commentary team was led by play-by-play announcer Jake Zivin and analyst Taylor Twellman; the Spanish team comprised Sammy Sadovnik and Diego Valeri. MLS Season Pass also aired pre-game and post-game shows in English and Spanish. The match was also broadcast on U.S. terrestrial television by Fox Sports in English and Fox Deportes in Spanish. Fox Sports primarily used the MLS Season Pass feed, which included 17 cameras, and added four of their own cameras. The English commentary team for Fox was led by play-by-play announcer John Strong and analyst Stu Holden; the Spanish team for Fox Deportes comprised Rodolfo Landeros and John Laguna as play-by-play announcers for each half, respectively. The Canadian television broadcast was carried by TSN in English and Réseau des sports (RDS) in French. The match was also shown live in Times Square in New York City on a large digital billboard that measures 330 by 78 feet (101 by 24 m).

The Fox broadcast drew 427,000 viewers and Fox Deportes had 41,000 viewers; the combined average of 468,000 viewers was a 47 percent decrease from MLS Cup 2023, which was also broadcast simultaneously on MLS Season Pass and Fox. The decrease in ratings was attributed to competition from the Apple broadcast as well as college football championship games; the 2024 SEC Championship Game kicked off at the same time as the MLS Cup. The match also drew a smaller television audience than the 2024 NWSL Championship and 2024 USL Championship Final, which both aired on CBS in November.

== Match ==
=== Summary ===
The MLS Cup final was played with a sellout crowd of 26,812 spectators at Dignity Health Sports Park, including 2,200 supporters and staff from the New York Red Bulls. The Galaxy used a 4–3–3 formation with two changes from the Western Conference Final as manager Greg Vanney replaced the injured Riqui Puig and Marco Reus in the midfield with Gastón Brugman, Edwin Cerrillo, and Mark Delgado. The Red Bulls intended to use an unchanged lineup with their 3–4–1–2 formation, but defender Andrés Reyes fell ill before kickoff and was replaced with Noah Eile. The referee for the match was Guido Gonzales Jr., who previously officiated the 2018 NWSL Championship.

The first goal was scored in the ninth minute by Joseph Paintsil at the end of a 15-pass sequence through the center of the Red Bulls defense with a through-ball by Brugman. Painstil celebrated by holding up Puig's jersey. The Galaxy extended their lead four minutes later with a 40-yard (37 m) run by Dejan Joveljić that ended with a successful shot into the goal while he fell to the ground. Joveljić's celebration included an homage to former Galaxy forward Robbie Keane's signature celebration. During a corner kick for the Red Bulls in the 28th minute, defender Sean Nealis controlled the ball and shot a slow volley into the goal to cut the lead to 2–1.

Near the end of the second half's six minutes of stoppage time, a whistle for an offside Red Bulls player was mistaken for the final whistle. Bench players and staff from the Galaxy began to run onto the field until the match could resume for a few seconds. The Philip F. Anschutz Trophy was presented to Galaxy captain Maya Yoshida by team owner and trophy namesake Philip Anschutz, who thanked "the fans who continued to have faith in the Galaxy".

=== Details ===
December 7, 2024
1:10 p.m. PST

LA Galaxy	2–1	New York Red Bulls
Paintsil 9'; Joveljić 13'	Report	S. Nealis 28'

Dignity Health Sports Park, Carson, California
Attendance: 26,812
Referee: Guido Gonzales Jr.

LA Galaxy	New York Red Bulls

GK	77	(United States) John McCarthy
RB	2	(Japan) Miki Yamane
CB	25	(Colombia) Carlos Emiro Garcés
CB	4	(Japan) Maya Yoshida (c)
LB	14	(United States) John Nelson
CM	8	(United States) Mark Delgado	(yellow card) 38'
CM	20	(United States) Edwin Cerrillo
CM	5	(Uruguay) Gastón Brugman		(substituted off) 75'
FW	28	(Ghana) Joseph Paintsil		(substituted off) 90+4'
FW	9	(Serbia) Dejan Joveljić		(substituted off) 78'
FW	11	(Brazil) Gabriel Pec
Substitutions:
GK	35	(Serbia) Novak Mićović
DF	15	(El Salvador) Eriq Zavaleta
DF	24	(United States) Jalen Neal		(substituted on) 90+4'
DF	3	(Argentina) Julián Aude
DF	19	(United States) Mauricio Cuevas
MF	7	(United States) Diego Fagúndez		(substituted on) 78'
MF	52	(United States) Isaiah Parente
MF	18	(Germany) Marco Reus		(substituted on) 75'
FW	27	(Spain) Miguel Berry
Manager:
(United States) Greg Vanney

GK	31	(Paraguay) Carlos Coronel
CB	12	(United States) Dylan Nealis		(substituted off) 84'
CB	3	(Sweden) Noah Eile	(yellow card) 35'
CB	15	(United States) Sean Nealis
RM	17	(United States) Cameron Harper	(yellow card) 71'
CM	75	(United States) Daniel Edelman		(substituted off) 84'
CM	5	(United States) Peter Stroud		(substituted off) 65'
LM	47	(United States) John Tolkin
AM	10	(Sweden) Emil Forsberg (c)
CF	13	(Belgium) Dante Vanzeir		(substituted off) 65'
CF	9	(Scotland) Lewis Morgan
Substitutions:
GK	18	(United States) Ryan Meara
DF	19	(Venezuela) Wikelman Carmona		(substituted on) 84'
MF	48	(Ghana) Ronald Donkor		(substituted on) 65'
FW	11	(Brazil) Elias Manoel		(substituted on) 65'
FW	22	(United States) Serge Ngoma
FW	7	(Jamaica) Cory Burke		(substituted on) 84'
FW	16	(United States) Julian Hall
FW	2	(Norway) Dennis Gjengaar
Manager:
(Germany) Sandro Schwarz

MLS Cup MVP: Gastón Brugman (LA Galaxy)

Assistant referees:
Kyle Atkins
Logan Brown
Fourth official:
Ismir Pekmic
Reserve assistant referee:
Joe Dickerson
Video assistant referee:
Younes Marrakchi
Assistant video assistant referee:
TJ Zablocki
Reserve video assistant referee:
Jose Da Silva

Match rules

- 90 minutes of regulation time
- 30 minutes of extra time if necessary
- Penalty shootout if scores still level
- Maximum of nine named substitutes
- Maximum of five substitutions, with a sixth allowed in extra time. Each team was only given three opportunities to make substitutions, excluding substitutions made at half-time, before the start of extra time, and at half-time in extra time. Two additional substitutions were available for players with concussion symptoms.

== Post-match ==
The Galaxy won their record-extending sixth MLS Cup championship and maintained their home undefeated streak at Dignity Health Sports Park. Greg Vanney became the fourth head coach to win an MLS Cup with two different teams, having previously managed Toronto FC at MLS Cup 2017. The Galaxy's eighteen goals scored in the playoffs surpassed the record set in the 2016 playoffs by Toronto FC, also coached by Vanney. Gastón Brugman was named the MLS Cup Most Valuable Player, becoming the first Uruguayan player to win the award. The 2024 final was the third consecutive MLS Cup match for Galaxy goalkeeper John McCarthy, who won titles with both Los Angeles clubs.

A victory celebration was held with fans on December 8 at Dignity Health Sports Park. As winner of the MLS Cup, the Galaxy qualified for the 2025 CONCACAF Champions Cup, an annual international competition for the top clubs in North America, Central America, and the Caribbean. The team had already qualified for another berth based on their finish during the regular season and the berth was transferred to the next team in the standings, Seattle Sounders FC. The Galaxy began their 2025 season without Puig and failed to win in the first sixteen matches of the regular season.
