= Lucas Sanabria (Uruguayan footballer) =

Uruguayan footballer (born 2003)

Personal information
- Full name: Lucas Agustín Sanabaria Magolé
- Date of birth: 26 December 2003 (age 22)
- Place of birth: Florida, Uruguay
- Height: 1.77 m (5 ft 10 in)
- Position: Midfielder

Team information
- Current team: LA Galaxy
- Number: 8

Youth career
- Nacional Florida
- Nacional

Senior career*
Years	Team	Apps	(Gls)
2024–2025	Nacional	29	(2)
2025–	LA Galaxy	21	(2)
- * Club domestic league appearances and goals as of 14:10, 1 June 2025 (UTC)

Lucas Agustín Sanabria Magolé (born 26 December 2003) is a Uruguayan professional footballer who plays as a midfielder for LA Galaxy in Major League Soccer.

== Club career ==
=== Nacional ===
Born in Florida, Sanabria began playing football aged eight with Nacional de Florida. Aged 17, he arrived at Nacional of Montevideo. He played two seasons in the fourth team, and one in the third team, under Álvaro Recoba.

Sanabria signed a professional contract in January 2024. He made his debut in the Uruguayan Primera División on 16 February 2024, starting in a 2–1 home win over River Plate Montevideo, and five days later he scored his first goal to open a 2–0 win away to Academia Puerto Cabello of Venezuela in the Copa Libertadores.

In April 2024, Sanabria missed some matches, which manager Álvaro Recoba credited to tendonitis. He scored his first goal on 23 June in a 4–0 win away to Cerro Largo, heading before half time. In July, with his contract lasting until December 2026, he was linked with a move to the Portland Timbers of Major League Soccer.

=== LA Galaxy ===
On 8 February 2025, Sanabria signed a five-year deal with LA Galaxy, reigning holders of the MLS Cup. He was allocated one of the club's under-22 slots. The transfer fee was US$5 million, with Nacional to receive US$1.8 million more if conditional clauses were met, in addition to 20% of the next transfer fee. Nacional president Flavio Perchman revealed that the club owned only 60% of Sanabria's economic rights to begin with, which he considered "something unusual".

Sanabria made his debut on 23 February in a 2–0 home loss to new MLS club San Diego FC, and in the following game, he suffered a collarbone injury against Vancouver Whitecaps FC and was ruled out for over a month. On 31 May, he scored his first goal to open a 2–0 home win over Real Salt Lake, as the Galaxy ended a 16-game winless start to the season that was the worst in MLS history.

== International career ==
In October 2024, Sanabria was called up to the Uruguay national team by manager Marcelo Bielsa, ahead of 2026 FIFA World Cup qualifiers against Peru and Ecuador.

== Personal life ==
Sanabria is the younger brother of footballer Juan Manuel Sanabria. He remained living with his family in Florida while playing for Nacional, commuting 75 minutes.

== Career statistics ==
As of match played 6 October 2024

Appearances and goals by club, season and competition
Club	Season	League			National cup (Note: Includes Copa Uruguay)		Continental		Other		Total	
Club	Season	Division	Apps	Goals	Apps	Goals	Apps	Goals	Apps	Goals	Apps	Goals
Nacional	2023	UPD	—		1	0	—		—		1	0
Nacional	2024	UPD	22	1	1	0	11 (Note: Appearances in Copa Libertadores)	1	1 (Note: Appearance in Torneo Intermedio final)	0	35	2
Career total			22	1	2	0	11	1	1	0	36	2
