= Harbor Miller =

American soccer player (born 2007)

Personal information
- Full name: Harbor Miller
- Date of birth: 21 June 2007 (age 19)
- Place of birth: Fullerton, California, United States
- Position: Defender

Team information
- Current team: LA Galaxy
- Number: 26

Youth career
- –2024: LA Galaxy Academy

Senior career*
Years	Team	Apps	(Gls)
2024–2025	Ventura County FC	40	(6)
2024–	LA Galaxy	47	(1)
- * Club domestic league appearances and goals

Harbor Miller (born June 21, 2007) is an American professional soccer player who plays as a defender and winger for MLS club LA Galaxy.

== Biography ==
Miller was born on 21 June 2007 in Fullerton, California. Miller began his career in the LA Galaxy Academy. He was named the MLS Next Cup MVP in the U17 MLS Next Cup final in a 4-2 victory over Real Colorado.

In February 2024, Miller joined Ventura County FC, LA Galaxy's reserve team. At the same time, he signed a three-year contract beginning in 2025 to join LA Galaxy's first team in their Homegrown player slot.

Miller joined the LA Galaxy MLS roster in 2025. He scored his first goal for the Galaxy on August 23, 2025 against the Colorado Rapids in a 3-0 win. He established himself as a regular starter while playing for the club.

On October 19, 2026, Miller was named to his first MLS Team of the Matchday for his performance in a 2-2 draw against San Diego FC, in which he recorded an assist.

== Style of play ==
Miller plays as a defender. American news website U.S. Soccer Collective wrote in 2026 that he "is an explosive, strong left-back who excels in one-touch scenarios and runs the wide channels well. He is comfortable pushing forward into the final third and solid defensively".
