= Chris Rindov =

American soccer player (born 2001)

Personal information
- Full name: Christopher Rindov
- Date of birth: October 8, 2001 (age 25)
- Place of birth: Silver Spring, Maryland, United States
- Height: 6 ft 2 in (1.88 m)
- Position: Center-back

Team information
- Current team: LA Galaxy
- Number: 20

Youth career
- –2019: Olney Soccer

College career
| Years | Team | Apps | (Gls) |
| 2019–2022 | Maryland Terrapins | 58 | (4) |

Senior career*
| Years | Team | Apps | (Gls) |
| 2023–2024 | Sporting Kansas City II | 48 | (1) |
| 2023–2024 | Sporting Kansas City | 1 | (0) |
| 2025– | Ventura County FC | 20 | (1) |
| 2025– | LA Galaxy | 5 | (0) |
- * Club domestic league appearances and goals as of 07:06, 29 September 2025 (UTC)

Christopher Rindov (born October 8, 2001) is an American professional soccer player who plays as a center-back for MLS club LA Galaxy.

== Career ==
=== Youth ===
Rindov attended Rockville High School, where he was a Washington Post All-Metro Honorable Mention selection and a First-team All-Montgomery County selection. He also played club soccer for Olney Boys & Girls Club, where he won four consecutive state championships between 2016 and 2019.

=== College ===
In 2019, Rindov attended the University of Maryland and was a walk-on player for the Terrapins. Over four seasons, Rindov went on to make 58 appearances, scoring four goals and tallying five assists, also captaining the team in his senior year. During his college soccer career, he was an Academic All-Big Ten Selection on three occasions, and in 2022 was a First Team All-Big Ten selection and Third Team United Soccer Coaches All-Region.

In Dec-2022 Rindov graduated with his Bachelor’s of Science in Mechanical Engineering from the University of Maryland.

=== Professional ===
On December 22, 2022 Rindov was selected 37th overall in the 2023 MLS SuperDraft by Sporting Kansas City. On February 10, 2023, Rindov signed a professional contract with Kansas City for the 2023 season, with club options until 2026.

In March 2025, he signed contract with LA Galaxy affiliated MLS Next Pro club Ventura County FC, before being drafted by LA Galaxy first team in September 2025. He made his MLS debut for LA Galaxy on 24 August, being priced for his good play. On 4 September he signed a contract through the 2026 season with club options for 2027 and 2028.

== Personal ==
Rindov holds American and Bulgarian citizenship.
