= Mauricio Cuevas =

American soccer player

Personal information
- Full name: Mauricio Aimar Cuevas
- Date of birth: February 10, 2003 (age 23)
- Place of birth: Los Angeles, California, United States
- Height: 1.70 m (5 ft 7 in)
- Position: Defender

Team information
- Current team: Santos Laguna
- Number: 3

Youth career
- 2016–2019: LA Galaxy

Senior career*
| Years | Team | Apps | (Gls) |
| 2019–2021 | LA Galaxy II | 21 | (4) |
| 2022–2023 | Club NXT | 23 | (0) |
| 2023–2026 | LA Galaxy | 63 | (3) |
| 2023–2024 | → Ventura County (loan) | 7 | (0) |
| 2026– | Santos Laguna | 17 | (0) |

International career^{‡}
| 2018 | United States U16 | 7 | (1) |
| 2019 | United States U17 | 6 | (0) |
| 2022–2023 | United States U20 | 10 | (1) |
| 2023– | United States U23 | 2 | (0) |
- * Club domestic league appearances and goals as of November 21, 2026 ‡ National team caps and goals as of March 25, 2024

Mauricio Aimar Cuevas (born February 10, 2003) is an American professional soccer player who plays as a defender for Liga MX club Santos Laguna.

== Club career ==
=== LA Galaxy II ===
Cuevas signed with USL Championship side LA Galaxy II on April 30, 2019. Following the 2021 season, Cuevas was released by the Galaxy.

=== Santos Laguna ===
On July 1, 2026, Cuevas signed with Santos Laguna.

== Personal life ==
Born in the United States, Cuevas is of Mexican descent.

== Honors ==
LA Galaxy

- MLS Cup: 2024
- 2025 LA Galaxy Humanitarian of the Year

United States U20

- CONCACAF U-20 Championship: 2022
