= Carlos Emiro Garcés =

Colombian footballer (born 2001)

Personal information
- Full name: Carlos Emiro Garcés Torres
- Date of birth: 11 October 2001 (age 25)
- Place of birth: López de Micay, Colombia
- Height: 1.86 m (6 ft 1 in)
- Position: Defender

Team information
- Current team: LA Galaxy
- Number: 25

Senior career*
Years	Team	Apps	(Gls)
2021–2024	Deportivo Pereira	53	(1)
2024–	LA Galaxy	39	(2)
2024–	→ Ventura County FC (loan)	2	(0)
- * Club domestic league appearances and goals

Carlos Emiro Garcés Torres (born 11 October 2001) is a Colombian footballer who plays as a defender for LA Galaxy.

== Career ==
He started his career with Colombian side Deportivo Pereira. He helped the club win the league.

== Style of play ==
He mainly operates as a defender. He is right-footed.

== Personal life ==
He was born in 2001 in Colombia. He is a native of López de Micay, Colombia.

== Honors ==
LA Galaxy

- MLS Cup: 2024
