= 2026 San Jose Earthquakes season =

San Jose Earthquakes
2026 season
- Head coach: Bruce Arena
- Stadium: PayPal Park; San Jose, California
- MLS: Conference: TBD; Overall: TBD
- MLS Cup playoffs: TBD
- Leagues Cup: Did not qualify
- U.S. Open Cup: Round of 32
Home colors	Away colors

The 2026 season is going to be the San Jose Earthquakes' 44th year of existence, their 29th season in Major League Soccer and their 19th consecutive season in the top-flight of American soccer.

== Roster ==
As of August 26, 2026

Note: Flags indicate national team as defined under FIFA eligibility rules; some limited exceptions apply. Players may hold more than one non-FIFA nationality.

No.	Pos.	Nation	Player
1	GK	SCO	Angus Gunn
2	DF	USA	Jamar Ricketts
3	DF	FRA	Paul Marie
4	DF	USA	Dave Romney
5	DF	USA	Daniel Munie
6	MF	USA	Ian Harkes
7	FW	BFA	Ousseni Bouda
9	FW	AUS	Luka Jovanović
10	MF	USA	Niko Tsakiris
11	FW	GER	Timo Werner
14	MF	GBS	Ronaldo Vieira
16	MF	USA	Jack Skahan
17	MF	USA	Jack Jasinski
18	DF	USA	Reid Roberts
19	FW	USA	Preston Judd
20	MF	USA	Nick Fernandez

No.	Pos.	Nation	Player
21	MF	ENG	Noel Buck
22	GK	USA	Nate Crockford
23	MF	GER	Eduard Löwen
24	DF	USA	DeJuan Jones
25	DF	USA	Max Floriani
28	DF	USA	Benji Kikanović
29	MF	USA	Kaedren Spivey
31	GK	USA	Francesco Montali
32	FW	NGR	Nonso Adimabua
34	MF	USA	Beau Leroux
35	MF	USA	Rohan Rajagopal
36	GK	USA	Earl Edwards Jr.
38	MF	USA	Edwyn Mendoza
40	MF	MEX	Jonathan González
79	FW	GRN	Darius Johnson
87	DF	BRA	Vítor Costa

=== Out on loan ===
Note: Flags indicate national team as defined under FIFA eligibility rules; some limited exceptions apply. Players may hold more than one non-FIFA nationality.

No.	Pos.	Nation	Player
15	MF	USA	Cruz Medina (on loan to Tapatío)
—	MF	ARG	Hernán López (on loan to Argentinos Juniors)
—	FW	COL	Chicho Arango (on loan to Atlético Nacional)

== Transfers ==
=== In ===
Date	No.	Pos.	Player	Transferred from	Fee/notes	Source
December 18, 2025	17	DF	(United States) Jack Jasinski	(United States) Princeton University	Selected 41st overall in the 2026 MLS SuperDraft	
January 12, 2026	22	GK	(United States) Nate Crockford	(United States) FC Cincinnati	2027 MLS SuperDraft 3rd Round pick	
January 29, 2026	11	FW	(Germany) Timo Werner	(Germany) RB Leipzig	Free	
February 20, 2026	32	FW	(Nigeria) Nonso Adimabua	(United States) San Jose Earthquakes II	Free	
February 20, 2026	40	MF	(Mexico) Jonathan González	(Mexico) FC Juárez	Free	
May 19, 2026	79	FW	(Grenada) Darius Johnson	(United States) Phoenix Rising FC	Undisclosed fee	
July 8, 2026	1	GK	(Scotland) Angus Gunn	(England) Nottingham Forest	Free	
July 16, 2026	9	FW	(Australia) Luka Jovanović	(Australia) Adelaide United	$700,000	
August 26, 2026	23	MF	(Germany) Eduard Löwen	(United States) St. Louis City SC	$425,000 2026 GAM $500,000 Conditional GAM	

=== Out ===
Date	No.	Pos.	Player	Transferred to	Fee/notes	Source
November 19, 2025	33	DF	(United States) Oscar Verhoeven	(United States) San Diego FC	$350,000 2026 GAM; Undisclosed sell-on fee	
November 26, 2025	4	DF	(Portugal) Bruno Wilson	Ararat-Armenia	Declined Contract Option	
November 26, 2025	14	MF	(Canada) Mark-Anthony Kaye	(United States) Sacramento Republic	Declined Contract Option	
November 26, 2025	17	FW	(Venezuela) Josef Martínez	(Mexico) Tijuana	Declined Contract Option	
November 26, 2025	26	FW	(Brazil) Rodrigues	(Brazil) Mirassol	Declined Contract Option	
December 19, 2025	27	DF	(United States) Wilson Eisner	(United States) San Diego FC	Free; Claimed off Waivers	
December 31, 2025	10	FW	(Argentina) Cristian Espinoza	(United States) Nashville SC	End of Contract	
January 2, 2026	47	MF	(United States) Chance Cowell	(United States) Real Salt Lake	$650,000 GAM; 2027 MLS SuperDraft 3rd Round pick swap Undiscolsed sell-on fee	
January 16, 2026	24	DF	(United States) Nick Lima	Retired		
January 21, 2026	15	MF	(United States) Cruz Medina	(Mexico) C.D. Tapatío	Loan + Buy option	
February 2, 2026	9	FW	(Colombia) Chicho Arango	(Colombia) Atletico Nacional	Loan + Buy option	
July 9, 2026	42	GK	(Brazil) Daniel	(United States) FC Dallas	$300,000 2026 GAM $400,000 2027 GAM $300,000 Conditional GAM	

=== MLS SuperDraft picks ===
2026 San Jose Earthquakes SuperDraft Picks
Round	Selection	Player	Position	College	Notes	Ref.
1	11				Traded to Houston Dynamo FC for $75,000 2026 GAM and $75,000 2027 GAM.	
2	11 (41)	(United States) Jack Jasinski	DF	Princeton University		
3	11 (71)				Traded to New York City FC for Alfredo Morales	

=== MLS Re-Entry Draft picks ===
2025 San Jose Earthquakes Re-Entry Picks
Round	Selection	Player	Position	Team	Notes	Ref.
1	11	PASS				
2	11 (41)	PASS				

== Competitions ==
=== Friendlies ===
February 7 Coachella Valley Invitational	San Jose Earthquakes (United States)	1–0	(United States) Charlotte FC	Indio, California
12:00 p.m. PDT	Leroux 41'	Report		Stadium: Empire Polo Club

February 11 Coachella Valley Invitational	San Jose Earthquakes (United States)	3–2	(United States) Portland Timbers	Indio, California
3:00 p.m. PDT	Judd 20'; Adimabua 71'; Marie 75'	Report	Velde 31', 36'	Stadium: Empire Polo Club

February 14 Coachella Valley Invitational	New York City FC (United States)	0–2	(United States) San Jose Earthquakes	Indio, California
1:00 p.m. PDT		Report	Bouda 71'; Tsakiris 88' (pen.)	Stadium: Empire Polo Club

July 3 Friendly	San Jose Earthquakes (United States)	1–2	(Mexico) Club Tijuana	San Jose, California
7:30 p.m. PDT	Leroux 16'	Report	Preciado 6', 43'	Stadium: Paypal Park; Referee: Victor Rivas

=== Major League Soccer ===
==== Standings ====
MLS Western Conference table (2026)
Pos	Team	Pld	W	L	T	GF	GA	GD	Pts	Qualification
2	FC Dallas	34	16	8	10	62	51	+11	58	Qualification for round one
3	St. Louis City SC	34	15	10	9	59	48	+11	54	Qualification for round one
4	San Jose Earthquakes	34	14	10	10	57	51	+6	52	Qualification for round one
5	Houston Dynamo FC	34	14	11	9	43	43	0	51	Qualification for round one
6	Los Angeles FC	34	12	11	11	52	40	+12	47	Qualification for round one

Source: MLS
Rules for classification: 1) points; 2) total wins; 3) total goal differential; 4) total goals scored; 5) fewer disciplinary points; 6) away goal differential; 7) away goals scored; 8) home goals differential; 9) home goals scored; 10) coin toss (2 clubs tied) or drawing of lots (≥3 clubs tied)

==== Overall table ====
Overall MLS standings table
Pos	Team	Pld	W	L	T	GF	GA	GD	Pts	Qualification
7	Charlotte FC	34	15	10	9	66	51	+15	54	
8	St. Louis City SC (U)	34	15	10	9	59	48	+11	54	Qualification for the CONCACAF Champions Cup round one (Note: As winners of U.S. Open Cup)
9	San Jose Earthquakes	34	14	10	10	57	51	+6	52	
10	Houston Dynamo FC	34	14	11	9	43	43	0	51	
11	Philadelphia Union	34	14	12	8	66	52	+14	50	

Source: MLS
Rules for classification: 1) points; 2) total wins; 3) total goal differential; 4) total goals scored; 5) fewer disciplinary points; 6) away goal differential; 7) away goals scored; 8) home goals differential; 9) home goals scored; 10) coin toss (2 clubs tied) or drawing of lots (≥3 clubs tied)
(U) U.S. Open Cup winners

==== Regular season ====
The MLS regular season schedule was released on November 20, 2025. The Earthquakes will play 34 matches—17 at home and 17 away—primarily against the 14 other teams in the Western Conference; the team is scheduled to play six opponents from the Eastern Conference. The regular season will include a six-week break for the 2026 FIFA World Cup in May and June. 15 of the Earthquakes' home matches will be played at PayPal Park, with their annual California Clásico game against the Los Angeles Galaxy on July 25 being played at Stanford Stadium and the September 19 game against Los Angeles FC being played at Levi's Stadium.

February 21 1	San Jose Earthquakes	3–0	Sporting Kansas City	San Jose, California
7:30 pm PST	Munie (yellow card) 36', (goal) 42', 54'; Judd 45+1'	Report		Stadium: PayPal Park; Attendance: 16,367; Referee: Alexis Da Silva

February 28 2	San Jose Earthquakes	2–0	Atlanta United FC	San Jose, California
4:30 pm PST	Judd 24'; Bouda 79'; Jones (yellow card) 90'	Report	Latte Lath (yellow card) 16'; Sanchez (yellow card) 39'; Hernández (yellow card) 52'	Stadium: PayPal Park; Attendance: 16,159; Referee: Ricardo Fierro

March 7 3	Philadelphia Union	0–1	San Jose Earthquakes	Chester, Pennsylvania
4:30 pm PST	Lukić (yellow card) 20'; Harriel (yellow card) 65'; Alladoh (yellow card) 88'	Report	Kikanović (yellow card) 15'; Bouda 59'; Judd (yellow card) 75'	Stadium: Subaru Park; Attendance: 17,410; Referee: Armando Villarreal

March 14 4 (HC)	San Jose Earthquakes	0–1	Seattle Sounders FC	San Jose, California
4:00 pm PDT	Tsakiris (yellow card) 86'	Report	Nouhou (yellow card) 10'; Rothrock 20'; Petković (yellow card) 46'; Musovski (yellow card) 56'; Kingston (yellow card) 59'	Stadium: PayPal Park; Attendance: 18,251; Referee: Victor Rivas

March 21 5	Vancouver Whitecaps FC	0–1	San Jose Earthquakes	Vancouver, British Columbia
7:30 pm PDT	Ngando (yellow card) 60'	Report	Werner (yellow card) 31'; Leroux 45+2'; Jones (yellow card) 50'; Judd (yellow card) 90+6'	Stadium: BC Place; Attendance: 21,261; Referee: Chris Penso

April 4 6	San Jose Earthquakes	3–0	San Diego FC	San Jose, California
7:30 pm PDT	Bouda (yellow card) 11'; Tsakiris 13', 34' (pen.), (yellow card) 90+3'; Judd 45+3'; González (yellow card) 77'	Report	Duah (red card) 32'; Søe (yellow card) 52'; Tverskov (yellow card) 59'	Stadium: PayPal Park; Attendance: 17,410; Referee: Fotis Bazakos

April 11 7	Sporting Kansas City	1–3	San Jose Earthquakes	Kansas City, Kansas
5:30 pm PDT	Bartlett 27'; Suleymanov (yellow card) 54'; Calheira (yellow card) 82'	Report	Skahan 45', 49'; Romney 75'	Stadium: Sporting Park; Attendance: 16,921; Referee: Allen Chapman

April 19 8	Los Angeles FC	1–4	San Jose Earthquakes	Los Angeles, California
4:00 pm PDT	Tillman (yellow card) 24'; Porteous (yellow card) 58'; Bouanga (yellow card) 63'; Roberts 75' (o.g.)	Report	Leroux (yellow card) 52'; Bouda 54', 80'; Werner 57'; Porteous 59' (o.g.); Roberts (yellow card) 62'; Harkes (yellow card) 90'	Stadium: BMO Stadium; Attendance: 22,114; Referee: Joe Dickerson

April 22 9	San Jose Earthquakes	5–1	Austin FC	San Jose, California
7:30 pm PDT	Edwards Jr. (yellow card) 45+1'; Roberts (yellow card) 54'; Jasinski 58', (yellow card) 68'; Werner 78' (pen.); Judd 83', 89'; Bouda 85'	Report	Rosales 9', (yellow card) 71'	Stadium: PayPal Park; Attendance: 12,276; Referee: Timothy Ford

April 25 10	St. Louis City SC	2–3	San Jose Earthquakes	St. Louis, Missouri
4:30 pm PDT	Córdova 52'; Hartel 53'; Durkin (yellow card) 84'; Polvara (yellow card) 90+5'	Report	Judd 8', (yellow card) 59'; Werner 69' (pen.), 83'; Daniel (yellow card) 75'; Ricketts (yellow card) 84'	Stadium: Energizer Park; Attendance: 22,423; Referee: Drew Fischer

May 2 11	Toronto FC	1–1	San Jose Earthquakes	Toronto, Ontario
10:00 am PDT	Sallói 2'; Osorio (yellow card) 75'; Coello (yellow card) 90+1'	Report	Judd 13'; Leroux (yellow card) 17'; Vieira (yellow card) 36'	Stadium: BMO Field; Attendance: 19,021; Referee: Michael Venne

May 9 12	San Jose Earthquakes	1–1	Vancouver Whitecaps FC	San Jose, California
7:30 pm PDT	Judd 4'; Vieira (yellow card) 25'; Kikanović (yellow card) 36'; Daniel (yellow card) 36'	Report	Berhalter (yellow card) 55', (goal) 76'	Stadium: PayPal Park; Attendance: 18,000; Referee: Malik Badawi

May 13 13 (HC)	Seattle Sounders FC	3–2	San Jose Earthquakes	Seattle, Washington
7:30 pm PDT	Rusnák 43' (pen.); Ferreira 55'; De Rosario 89'	Report	Fernandez 2'; Roberts (yellow card) 45+2'; Judd (yellow card) 58', (goal) 69'	Stadium: Lumen Field; Attendance: 28,726; Referee: Filip Dujic

May 16 14	San Jose Earthquakes	2–3	FC Dallas	San Jose, California
7:30 pm PDT	Leroux 18'; Munie (yellow card) 48'; Roberts 81'; Kikanović (yellow card) 85'; Daniel (yellow card) 90+4'	Report	Delgado 1'; Musa 49'; Ramiro (yellow card) 62'; Norris (yellow card) 90+1'; Cappis (yellow card) 90+3'; Sarver 90+3'	Stadium: PayPal Park; Attendance: 18,000; Referee: Chris Penso

May 23 15	Portland Timbers	1–3	San Jose Earthquakes	Portland, Oregon
6:30 pm PDT	Antony 18'; K. Miller (yellow card) 51'; Vieira (yellow card) 73'	Report	Judd 2' 12'; Munie 24'; Roberts (yellow card) 41'; Kikanović (yellow card) 45+2'; Daniel (yellow card) 85'	Stadium: Providence Park; Attendance: 24,686; Referee: Timothy Ford

July 22 16	San Jose Earthquakes	0–4	Orlando City SC	San Jose, California
7:30 pm PDT	Werner (yellow card) 45+1'; Vieira (yellow card) 52'; Judd (yellow card) 67'; Munie (yellow card) 90+4'	Report	Brekalo 7'; Angulo 29'; Atuesta (yellow card) 36'; Griezmann 48'; B. Ojeda 73'; Sarajian (yellow card) 81'	Stadium: PayPal Park; Attendance: 16,211; Referee: Elijio Arreguin

July 25 17 (CC)	San Jose Earthquakes	1–1	LA Galaxy	Stanford, California
7:30 pm PDT	Roberts 63'; Leroux (yellow card) 80'; Harkes (yellow card) 81'; Ricketts (yellow card) 90'; Kikanović (yellow card) 90+7'	Report	Paintsil 13', (yellow card) 90+7'; Sanabria (yellow card) 43'; Aude (yellow card) 45'	Stadium: Stanford Stadium; Attendance: 43,026; Referee: Armando Villarreal

August 1 18	FC Cincinnati	4–2	San Jose Earthquakes	Cincinnati, Ohio
4:30 pm PDT	Smith (yellow card) 20'; Ramírez 33'; Barlow 79'; Evander 82'; Bucha (yellow card) 87'; Robinson (yellow card) 89'; Jabbari 90+5'	Report	Munie 26'; Werner 56'	Stadium: TQL Stadium; Attendance: 25,513; Referee: Victor Rivas

August 15 19	San Jose Earthquakes	1–3	St. Louis City SC	San Jose, California
7:30 pm PDT	Leroux 47'; Roberts (yellow card) 82'	Report	Edelman 8'; Becher 27', 55'; Wallem (yellow card) 78'; Totland (yellow card) 84'	Stadium: PayPal Park; Attendance: 15,344; Referee: Jon Freemon

August 19 20 (CC)	LA Galaxy	1–0	San Jose Earthquakes	Carson, California
7:30 pm PDT	Miller (yellow card) 24'; Sanabria (yellow card) 37', (yellow card) 45' (red card); Paintsil 79'; Haak (yellow card) 90+2'	Report	Fernandez (yellow card) 29'; Romney (yellow card) 57'; Jasinski (yellow card) 84'	Stadium: Dignity Health Sports Park; Attendance: 15,435; Referee: Ramy Touchan

August 22 21	San Jose Earthquakes	1–5	Minnesota United FC	San Jose, California
7:30 pm PDT	Werner 4' (pen.); Kikanović (yellow card) 85'	Report	Pereyra 10'; Yeboah 40', 44'; Caldeira 65'; González 86'	Stadium: PayPal Park; Attendance: 14,517; Referee: Jair Marrufo

August 29 22	Houston Dynamo FC	0–0	San Jose Earthquakes	Houston, Texas
5:30 pm PDT		Report	Roberts (yellow card) 58'	Stadium: Shell Energy Stadium; Attendance: 20,308; Referee: Pierre-Luc Lauziere

September 5 23	Austin FC	1–1	San Jose Earthquakes	Austin, Texas
7:30 pm PDT	Stuver (yellow card) 87'; Guilherme Biro 90+6'	Report	Leroux 8'; Roberts (yellow card) 65'	Stadium: Q2 Stadium; Attendance: 20,738; Referee: Sergii Boiko

September 9 24	San Diego FC	2–3	San Jose Earthquakes	San Diego, California
5:30 pm PDT	dos Santos (yellow card) 7' (red card) 80'; McVey (yellow card) 18'; Dreyer 42'; Tverskov (yellow card) 52'; Bakambu 90+4' (pen.)	Report	Tsakiris 3', (penalty missed) 8'; Judd 12', (yellow card) 13'; Bouda 35', (yellow card) 37'; Leroux (yellow card) 45+3'; Floriani (yellow card) 75' (red card) 90+2'; Vieira (yellow card) 90+5'	Stadium: Snapdragon Stadium; Attendance: 18,799; Referee: Alexis Da Silva

September 12 25	San Jose Earthquakes	1–0	Houston Dynamo FC	San Jose, California
7:30 pm PDT	Vieira (yellow card) 1'; Leroux (yellow card) 19'; Munie 38'; Kikanović (yellow card) 90'	Report	Resch (yellow card) 75'	Stadium: PayPal Park; Attendance: 15,204; Referee: Rosendo Mendoza

September 19 26	San Jose Earthquakes	2–2	Los Angeles FC	Santa Clara, California
4:30 pm PDT	Judd (yellow card) 66', (goal) 70'; Tsakiris (yellow card) 90+6'; Roberts 90+8'	Report	Son Heung-min 34'; Long (red card) 36'; Bouanga 53'; Delgado (yellow card) 73'; Palacios (yellow card) 75'	Stadium: Levi's Stadium; Attendance: 40,518; Referee: Drew Fischer

September 26 27	San Jose Earthquakes	3–1	Portland Timbers	San Jose, California
4:00 pm PDT	Judd 4', 29', (yellow card) 30'; Löwen 24'; Roberts (yellow card) 40'	Report	Miller (yellow card) 76'	Stadium: PayPal Park; Attendance: 15,061; Referee: Lorenzo Hernandez

October 10 28	Colorado Rapids	1–1	San Jose Earthquakes	Commerce City, Colorado
5:30 pm PDT	Phillip 27'; Williams (yellow card) 45+3'	Report	Jasinski (yellow card) 44'; Romney 57'	Stadium: Dick's Sporting Goods Park; Attendance: 15,112; Referee: Filip Dujic

October 14 29	Real Salt Lake	1–1	San Jose Earthquakes	Sandy, Utah
6:30 pm PDT	de Fougerolles 79'; Piol (yellow card) 90+2'	Report	Jasinski 90+5'	Stadium: America First Field; Attendance: 19,783; Referee: Sergii Demianchuk

October 17 30	San Jose Earthquakes	1–1	Nashville SC	San Jose, California
7:30 pm PDT	Leroux (yellow card) 39'; Judd (yellow card) 45+3', (goal) 70'; Harkes (yellow card) 90'	Report	Mohammed (yellow card) 28'; Mukhtar 34'	Stadium: PayPal Park; Attendance: 16,425; Referee: Joe Dickerson

October 24 31	FC Dallas	3–0	San Jose Earthquakes	Frisco, Texas
5:30 pm PDT	Musa 83', 88' (pen.); Moreno 90+4'	Report	Roberts (yellow card) 29'; Gunn (yellow card) 64'	Stadium: Toyota Stadium; Attendance: 10,925; Referee: Rubiel Vazquez

October 28 32	San Jose Earthquakes	2–2	Colorado Rapids	San Jose, California
7:30 pm PDT	Roberts 15'; Werner (red card) 71'; Judd (yellow card) 82'; Jasinski 83'; Bouda (yellow card) 90+5'	Report	Atencio (yellow card) 22'; Whittaker 26'; Phillip (yellow card) 50'; Williams (yellow card) 62'; Minoungou (yellow card) 65'; Yapi 73'; Thompson (red card) 75'; Abu Farki (yellow card) 90+2'	Stadium: PayPal Park; Attendance: 15,034; Referee: Ramy Touchan

October 31 33	San Jose Earthquakes	2–1	Real Salt Lake	San Jose, California
2:00 pm PDT	Bouda 2'; Kikanović 17'; Roberts (yellow card) 46'; Tsakiris (yellow card) 60'	Report	Sanabria 23'; Quinton (yellow card) 63'; Katranis (yellow card) 90+6'	Stadium: PayPal Park; Attendance: 12,911; Referee: Lorenzo Hernandez

November 7 34	Minnesota United FC	3–1	San Jose Earthquakes	Saint Paul, Minnesota
4:00 pm PST	Gene (yellow card) 54'; Chancalay 58', (yellow card) 87'; Duggan (yellow card) 60'; Gunn 82' (o.g.); Triantis 90+5'	Report	Vieira (yellow card) 47'; Ricketts (yellow card) 68'; Judd (yellow card) 69'	Stadium: Allianz Field; Attendance: 19,714; Referee: Alexis da Silva

=== MLS Cup playoffs ===
November 24 Round one match 1	San Jose Earthquakes	v	Houston Dynamo FC	San Jose, California
7:00 pm PST				Stadium: PayPal Park

November 28 Round one match 2	Houston Dynamo FC	v	San Jose Earthquakes	Houston, Texas
11:30 am PST				Stadium: Shell Energy Stadium

December 2 Round one match 3	San Jose Earthquakes	v	Houston Dynamo FC	San Jose, California
pm PST				Stadium: PayPal Park

=== U.S. Open Cup ===
On December 4, 2025, U.S. Soccer announced the Earthquakes would take part in the 2026 U.S. Open Cup, entering in the Round of 32 along with all MLS teams participating in this iteration of the tournament.

April 15 Round of 32	San Jose Earthquakes (California)	2–0	(Arizona) Phoenix Rising FC	San Jose, California
7:00 pm PDT	Fernandez 3'; González (yellow card) 13' (yellow-red card) 39'; Jasinski 23', (yellow card) 37'; Marie (yellow card) 28'	Report	Pelayo (yellow card) 46'; Dennis (yellow card) 84'; Capetillo (yellow card) 90+1'	Stadium: PayPal Park; Attendance: 7,868; Referee: Elton García

April 28 Round of 16	San Jose Earthquakes (California)	4–2	Minnesota United FC	San Jose, California
7:00 pm PDT	Leroux 15', 73'; Vieira (yellow card) 27'; Judd (yellow card) 45'; Padelford 68' (o.g.); Tsakiris 75'	Report	Vieira 59' (o.g.); Chancalay 63'	Stadium: PayPal Park; Referee: Lorenzo Hernandez

May 20 Quarterfinals	Colorado Rapids	2–0	(California) San Jose Earthquakes	Commerce City, Colorado
7:00 pm PDT	Yapi 40'; R. Navarro 45+10' (pen.); Hansen (yellow card) 89'; Travis (yellow card) 90'	Report	Vieira (yellow card) 21'; Roberts (yellow card) 36'; Kikanović (yellow card) 53'	Stadium: Dick's Sporting Goods Park; Referee: Fotis Bazakos

=== Leagues Cup ===
The Earthquakes did not qualify for the 2026 Leagues Cup as they were not one of the top 9 teams in the Western Conference for the 2025 season.
