= 2023 San Jose Earthquakes season =

San Jose Earthquakes
2023 season
- Head coach: Luchi Gonzalez
- Stadium: PayPal Park; San Jose, California
- MLS: Conference: 9th (of 14); Overall: 16th (of 29)
- MLS Cup Playoffs: Wild Card
- U.S. Open Cup: Third Round
- Leagues Cup: Group stage
- Average home league attendance: 18,412
Home colors	Away colors

The 2023 season was the San Jose Earthquakes' 41st year of existence, their 26th season in Major League Soccer and their 16th consecutive season in the top-flight of American soccer.

== Roster ==
As of August 4, 2023

No.	Pos.	Nation	Player
1	GK	USA	JT Marcinkowski (HG)
3	DF	FRA	Paul Marie
4	DF	GHA	Jonathan Mensah
7	MF	ECU	Carlos Gruezo (DP)
10	FW	ARG	Cristian Espinoza (DP)
11	FW	USA	Jeremy Ebobisse
12	FW	USA	Matthew Hoppe (on loan from Middlesbrough)
13	DF	BRA	Nathan
14	MF	USA	Jackson Yueill
15	DF	USA	Tanner Beason
16	MF	USA	Jack Skahan
17	DF	USA	Keegan Tingey (HG)
19	MF	USA	Cam Cilley (HG)
20	MF	USA	Will Richmond (HG)
21	DF	PER	Miguel Trauco
22	DF	USA	Tommy Thompson (HG)
23	DF	SWE	Oskar Ågren
24	DF	USA	Daniel Munie
25	FW	BFA	Ousseni Bouda (GA)
26	DF	BRA	Rodrigues (on loan from Grêmio)
28	FW	USA	Benjamin Kikanović
29	DF	EQG	Carlos Akapo
30	MF	USA	Niko Tsakiris (HG)
35	MF	CPV	Jamiro Monteiro (DP)
41	GK	USA	Emi Ochoa (HG)
42	GK	BRA	Daniel
44	FW	USA	Cade Cowell (HG)
55	MF	CAN	Michael Baldisimo
77	DF	USA	Casey Walls (HG)
93	MF	BRA	Judson
99	MF	USA	Cruz Medina (HG)

== Transfers ==
=== In ===
No.	Pos.	Player	Previous club	Fee/notes	Date
19	MF	(United States) Cam Cilley	(United States) Stanford Cardinal	Homegrown Signing	January 6, 2023
17	DF	(United States) Keegan Tingey	(United States) Stanford Cardinal	Homegrown Signing	January 6, 2023
55	MF	(Canada) Michael Baldisimo	(Canada) Vancouver Whitecaps FC	Supplemental Draft Pick	January 9, 2023
42	GK	(Brazil) Daniel	(Brazil) Internacional	Undisclosed fee	January 21, 2023
7	MF	(Ecuador) Carlos Gruezo	(Germany) FC Augsburg	Undisclosed fee	January 31, 2023
4	DF	(Ghana) Jonathan Mensah	(United States) Columbus Crew	Trade	February 11, 2023
24	DF	(United States) Daniel Munie	(United States) Indiana Hoosiers	2023 MLS SuperDraft pick	February 24, 2023

=== Out ===
No.	Pos.	Player	Transferred to	Fee/notes	Date
6	MF	(United States) Shea Salinas	Retirement		November 14, 2022
5	MF	(Argentina) Eric Remedi	(Argentina) Banfield	Out of Contract	November 14, 2022
18	MF	(Ghana) George Asomani	Free Agency	Option Declined	November 14, 2022
21	MF	(United States) Gilbert Fuentes	Free Agency	Option Declined	November 14, 2022
17	MF	(Slovakia) Ján Greguš	(United States) Nashville SC	Option Declined	November 14, 2022
12	GK	(United States) Matt Bersano	(United States) Austin FC	Option Declined	November 14, 2022
19	MF	(Somalia) Siad Haji	(United States) FC Tulsa	Option Declined	November 14, 2022

== Competitions ==
=== Friendlies ===
February 4 Preseason	Monterey Bay FC	1–2	San Jose Earthquakes	Seaside, California
7:00 PM PST	Martinez 44'	Report	Ebobisse 28'; Munie 85'	Stadium: Cardinale Stadium; Attendance: 4,648

February 9 Coachella Valley Invitational	San Jose Earthquakes	2–1	D.C. United	Indio, California
11:00 AM PST	Monteiro 23'; Espinoza 31'	Report	Fountas 70' (pen.)	Stadium: Empire Polo Club

February 15 Coachella Valley Invitational	Minnesota United F.C.	1–4	San Jose Earthquakes	Indio, California
12:00 PM PST	García 14' (pen.)	Report	Espinoza 7', 9'; Tsakiris 61'; Munie 78'	Stadium: Empire Polo Club

February 18 Coachella Valley Invitational	San Jose Earthquakes	0–2	New York Red Bulls	Indio, California
10:00 AM PST		Report	Barlow 11', 17'	Stadium: Empire Polo Club

=== Major League Soccer ===
==== Standings ====
MLS Western Conference table (2023)
Pos	Team	Pld	W	L	T	GF	GA	GD	Pts	Qualification
7	FC Dallas	34	11	10	13	41	37	+4	46	Qualification for round one
8	Sporting Kansas City	34	12	14	8	48	51	−3	44	Qualification for the wild-card round
9	San Jose Earthquakes	34	10	10	14	39	43	−4	44	Qualification for the wild-card round
10	Portland Timbers	34	11	13	10	46	58	−12	43	
11	Minnesota United FC	34	10	13	11	46	51	−5	41	

Source: MLS
Rules for classification: 1) points; 2) total wins; 3) total goal differential; 4) total goals scored; 5) fewer disciplinary points; 6) away goal differential; 7) away goals scored; 8) home goals differential; 9) home goals scored; 10) coin toss (2 clubs tied) or drawing of lots (≥3 clubs tied)

==== Match results ====
February 25 1	Atlanta United FC	2–1	San Jose Earthquakes	Atlanta, Georgia
4:30 PM PST	Ibarra (yellow card) 90+1'; Almada 90+3', (yellow card) 90+8', (goal) 90+9'	Report	Ebobisse 12'; Gruezo (yellow card) 13'; Kikanovic (yellow card) 90+1'	Stadium: Mercedes Benz Stadium; Attendance: 67,538; Referee: Jon Freemon

March 4 2	San Jose Earthquakes	2–1	Vancouver Whitecaps FC	San Jose, California
7:30pm PST	Yueill (yellow card) 58'; Ebobisse 68'; Akapo 77'; Espinoza (yellow card) 83'	Report	Schöpf 17', (yellow card) 69'; Veselinović (yellow card) 36'; Cubas (yellow card) 41'; Martins (yellow card) 68'	Stadium: PayPal Park; Attendance: 18,000; Referee: Mark Allatin

March 11 3	San Jose Earthquakes	1–0	Colorado Rapids	San Jose, California
7:30 PM PST	Espinoza 78'; Monteiro (red card) 90+3'	Report	Acosta (yellow card) 45+2'; Price (yellow card) 90+3'	Stadium: PayPal Park; Attendance: 13,383; Referee: Ramy Touchan

March 18 4	St. Louis City SC	3–0	San Jose Earthquakes	St. Louis, Missouri
5:30 PM PDT	Gioacchini 34'; Klauss 45+3'; Ostrák 68'; Löwen (yellow card) 90+4'	Report	Rodrigues (yellow card) 14'; Trauco (yellow card) 40'; Kikanovic (yellow card) 46'; Cowell (yellow card) 64'; Baldisimo (yellow card) 66'	Stadium: Citypark; Attendance: 22,000; Referee: Rosendo Mendoza

March 25 5	San Jose Earthquakes	0–0	Toronto FC	San Jose, California
7:30 PM PDT	Marie (yellow card) 30'	Report	Bernardeschi (yellow card) 77'	Stadium: PayPal Park; Attendance: 12,434; Referee: Fotis Bazakos

April 1 6	San Jose Earthquakes	2–1	Houston Dynamo FC	San Jose, California
7:30 PM PDT	Espinoza 7' (pen.), 65' (pen.); Mensah (yellow card) 17'; Akapo (yellow card) 33'; Monteiro (yellow card) 59'	Report	Bassi 42' (pen.); Artur (yellow card) 44'; Escobar (yellow card) 64'	Stadium: PayPal Park; Attendance: 12,786; Referee: Tori Penso

April 8 7	New York Red Bulls	1–1	San Jose Earthquakes	Harrison, New Jersey
4:30 PM PDT	Fernandez (yellow card) 11'; Nealis (yellow card) 54'; Barlow 90+17'	Report	Rodrigues (yellow card) 24'; Judson (yellow card) 56'; Espinoza 80'; Marie (yellow card) 90+19'	Stadium: Red Bull Arena; Attendance: 15,939; Referee: Ismir Pekmic

April 15 8	San Jose Earthquakes	3–0	Sporting Kansas City	San Jose, California
7:30 PM PDT	Espinoza 9', (yellow card) 59'; Ebobisse 40' (pen.), 51'; Gruezo (yellow card) 77'	Report	Thommy (yellow card) 31'; Castellanos (red card) 90+3'	Stadium: PayPal Park; Attendance: 14,212; Referee: Timothy Ford

April 22 9	Real Salt Lake	3-1	San Jose Earthquakes	Sandy, Utah
6:30PM PDT	Löffelsend 39'; Ruiz (yellow card) 45'; Savarino 54'; Gómez 80'	Report	Espinoza 49'	Stadium: America First Field; Attendance: 16,666; Referee: Filip Dujic

April 29 10	Austin FC	2–2	San Jose Earthquakes	Austin, Texas
5:30PM PDT	Rigoni 40'; Driussi 78'; Pereira (yellow card) 90+5'	Report	Yueill 21', (yellow card) 90+5'; Monteiro (yellow card) 68'; Ebobisse 75'	Stadium: Q2 Stadium; Attendance: 20,738; Referee: Guido Gonzales Jr.

May 6 11	San Jose Earthquakes	2–1	Los Angeles FC	Santa Clara, California
4:30 PM (PDT)	Espinoza 8', 83' (pen.)	Report	Bogusz (yellow card) 29'; Bouanga 30'; Maldonado (yellow card) 83'	Stadium: Levi's Stadium; Attendance: 45,112; Referee: Rubiel Vazquez

May 14 12 – California Clasico	LA Galaxy	2–1	San Jose Earthquakes	Carson, California
6:30 PM PDT	Hernández (yellow card) 27'; Delgado (yellow card) 35'; Cáceres 60'; Joveljić 90+1', (yellow card) 90+1'	Report	Rodrigues (yellow card) 46'; Mensah (yellow card) 73'; Judson (yellow card) 82'; Bouda (yellow card) 89', (goal) 90+4'	Stadium: Dignity Health Sports Park; Attendance: 16,035; Referee: Joe Dickerson

May 20 13	Los Angeles FC	2–1	San Jose Earthquakes	Los Angeles, California
7:30 PM PDT	Biuk 3'; Maldonado (yellow card) 29'; Vela 90+5' (pen.)	Report	Trauco 52'; Judson (yellow card) 89'	Stadium: BMO Stadium; Attendance: 22,030; Referee: Ismail Elfath

May 27 14	San Jose Earthquakes	1–1	FC Dallas	San Jose, California
7:30 PM PT	Yueill (yellow card) 25'; Marie (yellow card) 49'; Kikanović 70'; Judson (yellow card) 90' (yellow-red card) 90+10'; Gruezo (yellow card) 90+9'	Report	Farfan (yellow card) 69'; Velasco (yellow card) 90'; Tafari 90+4'	Stadium: PayPal Park; Attendance: 13,409; Referee: Filip Dujic

May 31 15 – Heritage Cup	Seattle Sounders FC	0–1	San Jose Earthquakes	Seattle, Washington
7:30 PM PDT	A. Roldán (yellow card) 19'; Ragen (yellow card) 43'; Atencio (yellow card) 86'	Report	Ebobisse 48'; Marie (yellow card) 66'; Yueill (yellow card) 77'	Stadium: Lumen Field; Attendance: 30,013; Referee: Ramy Touchan

June 3 16	Colorado Rapids	0–0	San Jose Earthquakes	Commerce City, Colorado
6:30 PM PDT	Bombito (yellow card) 44' (yellow-red card) 51'; Cabral (yellow card) 59'	Report		Stadium: Dick's Sporting Goods Park; Attendance: 15,038; Referee: Sergii Boiko

June 10 17	San Jose Earthquakes	2–1	Philadelphia Union	San Jose, California
7:30 PM PDT	Ebobisse 8'; Trauco 57'	Report	Lowe 17'	Stadium: PayPal Park; Attendance: 15,512; Referee: Nima Saghafi

June 17 18	San Jose Earthquakes	0–0	Portland Timbers	San Jose, California
7:30 PM PDT	Cowell (yellow card) 51'; Marie (yellow card) 54'; Thompson (yellow card) 90+1'	Report	Moreno (yellow card) 18'; Zuparic (yellow card) 44'; Miller (yellow card) 64'	Stadium: PayPal Park; Attendance: 14,188; Referee: Alex Chilowicz

June 21 19	Houston Dynamo FC	4–1	San Jose Earthquakes	Houston, Texas
5:30PM PDT	Bassi 3'; Baird 5'; Sviatchenko (yellow card) 37'; Úlfarsson 77', 89'; Herrera (yellow card) 86'	Report	Ebobisse (yellow card) 38'; Akapo; Bouda (yellow card) 50'; Judson (yellow card) 67'; Yueill (yellow card) 81'; Skahan (yellow card) 85'	Stadium: Shell Energy Stadium; Attendance: 14,249; Referee: Ismir Pekmic

June 24 20	San Jose Earthquakes	1–2	St. Louis City SC	San Jose, California
7:30 PM PDT	Monteiro 47', (yellow card) 49'; Tsakiris (yellow card) 84'; Akapo (yellow card) 90+1'	Report	Adeniran 41', 58' (pen.); Jackson (yellow card) 59'; Pompeu (yellow card) 90+2'; Ostrák (yellow card) 90+6'	Stadium: PayPal Park; Attendance: 15,074; Referee: Marcos de Oliveira

July 1 21 – California Clasico	San Jose Earthquakes	2–2	LA Galaxy	Stanford, California
7:30 PM PDT	Espinoza (yellow card) 20', (goal) 81'; Skahan 42'; Tsakiris (yellow card) 57'; Yueill (yellow card) 90+4'	Report	Edwards 31', (yellow card) 40'; Judd 47'; Calegari (yellow card) 78'; Aude (yellow card) 90+8'	Stadium: Stanford Stadium; Attendance: 42,823; Referee: Ramy Touchan

July 8 22	Los Angeles FC	1–1	San Jose Earthquakes	Los Angeles, California
7:30 PM PDT	Bouanga 37' (pen.)	Report	Mensah (yellow card) 22'; Gruezo (yellow card) 27'; Espinoza 30'; Daniel (red card) 56'; Marcinkowski (yellow card) 90+2'	Stadium: BMO Stadium; Attendance: 22,033; Referee: Lukasz Szpala

July 12 23 – Heritage Cup	San Jose Earthquakes	2–0	Seattle Sounders FC	San Jose, California
7:30PM PDT	Espinoza 19' (pen.); Trauco 65'	Report	Nouhou (yellow card) 41'; Léo Chú (yellow card) 45+4'	Stadium: PayPal Park; Attendance: 13,577; Referee: Fotis Bazakos

August 20 24	Vancouver Whitecaps FC	0–1	San Jose Earthquakes	Vancouver, British Columbia
7:30 PM PDT	Gauld (yellow card) 90'	Report	Monteiro (yellow card) 39'; Espinoza 43'; Gruezo (yellow card) 62'; Tsakiris (yellow card) 79'; Daniel (yellow card) 82'; Marie (yellow card) 89'; Rodrigues (yellow card) 90'	Stadium: BC Place; Attendance: 16,765; Referee: Ismir Pekmic

August 25 25	Sporting Kansas City	3–0	San Jose Earthquakes	Kansas City, Kansas
5:30 PM PDT	Sallói 3'; Russell 42'; Thommy 69'	Report		Stadium: Children's Mercy Park; Attendance: 18,892; Referee: Pierre-Luc Lauziere

August 30 26 – California Clasico	San Jose Earthquakes	2–3	LA Galaxy	San Jose, California
7:30 PM PDT	Rodrigues (yellow card) 19'; Calegari 29' (o.g.); Ebobisse 31'; Akapo (yellow card) 43'; Trauco (yellow card) 65'; Gruezo (yellow card) 75'; Marie (yellow card) 90+2'	Report	Boyd 16'; Puig 50'; Joveljić 61' (pen.); Cerrillo (yellow card) 83'; Aude (yellow card) 90+9'	Stadium: PayPal Park; Attendance: 16,224; Referee: Lukasz Szpala

September 2 27	San Jose Earthquakes	1–1	Minnesota United FC	San Jose, California
7:30 PM PDT	Cowell 16'; Gruezo (yellow card) 31'	Report	Pukki 4'; Reynoso (yellow card) 40'; Boxall (yellow card) 85'	Stadium: PayPal Park; Attendance: 16,151; Referee: Alexis Da Silva

September 9 28	D.C. United	0–0	San Jose Earthquakes	Washington D.C.
4:30 PM (PDT)	Santos (yellow card) 65'	Report	Munie (yellow card) 51'; Rodrigues (yellow card) 57'; Ebobisse (yellow card) 63'; Beason (red card) 90'	Stadium: Audi Field; Attendance: 17,255; Referee: Tori Penso

September 16 29	San Jose Earthquakes	2–1	Real Salt Lake	San Jose, California
7:30PM PDT	Ebobisse 2'; Rodrigues 15'	Report	Vera (yellow card) 13'; Arango 44', (yellow card) 69'	Stadium: PayPal Park; Attendance: 15,390; Referee: Natalie Simon

September 20 30	Portland Timbers	2–1	San Jose Earthquakes	Portland, Oregon
7:30 PM PDT	Paredes (yellow card) 41', (goal) 45+3'; Evander 58'; Bingham (yellow card) 90+9'	Report	Marie (yellow card) 32'; Gruezo (yellow card) 35'; Hoppe 60'; Espinoza (yellow card) 90+2'	Stadium: Providence Park; Attendance: 21,518; Referee: Ramy Touchan

September 23 31	San Jose Earthquakes	1–1	Nashville SC	San Jose, California
7:30PM PDT	Espinoza (yellow card) 10'; Gruezo (yellow card) 54'; Hoppe 74'	Report	Godoy (yellow card) 11'; Bunbury 50'; Zimmerman (yellow card) 89'	Stadium: PayPal Park; Attendance: 16,728; Referee: Joseph Dickerson

September 30 32	Minnesota United FC	1–1	San Jose Earthquakes	Saint Paul, Minnesota
5:30PM PDT	Pukki 56'; Arriaga (yellow card) 90+1'	Report	Marie 82'	Stadium: Allianz Field; Attendance: 19,645; Referee: Ted Unkel

October 7 33	FC Dallas	1–1	San Jose Earthquakes	Frisco, Texas
5:30 PM PDT	Obrian 57'; Ibeagha (yellow card) 60'; Twumasi (yellow card) 90+2'	Report	Ebobisse 3', (yellow card) 21'	Stadium: Toyota Stadium; Attendance: 17,474; Referee: Filip Dujic

October 21 34	San Jose Earthquakes	1–1	Austin FC	San Jose, California
6:00 PM PDT	Espinoza 17', (yellow card) 72'; Tsakiris (yellow card) 22'	Report	Wolff 32'; Valencia (yellow card) 66'	Stadium: PayPal Park; Attendance: 18,000; Referee: Rosendo Mendoza

=== MLS Cup Playoffs ===
October 25 Wild Card	Sporting Kansas City	0–0 (4–2 p)	San Jose Earthquakes	Kansas City, Kansas
6:30 pm PDT	Fontàs (yellow card) 59'	Report	Hoppe (yellow card) 55'; Skahan (yellow card) 80'; Judson (yellow card) 87'	Stadium: Children's Mercy Park; Attendance: 17,437; Referee: Allen Chapman
	Penalties
	Russell (penalty scored); Pulido (penalty missed); Thommy (penalty scored); Kinda (penalty scored); Sallói (penalty scored)		(penalty missed) Espinoza; (penalty missed) Yueill; (penalty scored) Skahan; (penalty scored) Akapo

=== U.S. Open Cup ===
The Earthquakes will enter the 2023 U.S. Open Cup in the third round as part of the lower tranche of MLS teams, as determined by their final position in the 2022 regular season. The third round is scheduled for April 18 and 19.

April 25	Monterey Bay (USLC) (California)	1–0	(California) San Jose Earthquakes (MLS)	Seaside, CA
7:00 PM PDT	Volesky 26'; Martinez (yellow card) 41'; Rebollar (yellow card) 87'; Siaha (yellow card) 90+3'	Report	Trauco (yellow card) 32'	Stadium: Cardinale Stadium; Attendance: 4,010; Referee: Christopher Calderon

=== Leagues Cup ===
The 2023 Leagues Cup, an expanded version of the inter-league competition between MLS and Liga MX, is scheduled to begin on July 21. All MLS matches will be paused until the end of the tournament on August 19. The Earthquakes were drawn into the West 1 group alongside Portland Timbers and Liga MX's Tigres UANL. MLS teams will play a minimum of two matches in the tournament, of which they will host at least one.

==== West 1 ====
Pos	Team	Pld	W	PW	PL	L	GF	GA	GD	Pts	Qualification	UAN	POR	SJE
1	(Mexico) UANL	2	2	0	0	0	3	1	+2	6	Advance to knockout stage	—	2–1	1–0
2	(United States) Portland Timbers	2	1	0	0	1	3	2	+1	3	Advance to knockout stage	—	—	2–0
3	(United States) San Jose Earthquakes	2	0	0	0	2	0	3	−3	0		—	—	—

Source: Leagues Cup
Rules for classification: Tiebreakers

July 22 GS	Portland Timbers (United States)	2–0	(United States) San Jose Earthquakes	Portland
7 PM PDT	Evander 33'; Paredes (yellow card) 45+2'; Mora 86'	Report	Gruezo (yellow card) 35'	Stadium: Providence Park; Attendance: 21,137; Referee: Víctor Alfonso Cáceres Hernández

July 30 GS	San Jose Earthquakes (United States)	0–1	(Mexico) UANL	San Jose, California
8 PM PDT	Akapo (yellow card) 41'; Ebobisse (yellow card) 76'	Report	Gorriarán 19'; Reyes (yellow card) 44'	Stadium: PayPal Park; Attendance: 17,449; Referee: Marcos de Oliveira
