= 2022 San Jose Earthquakes season =

San Jose Earthquakes
2022 season
- Head coach: Alex Covelo (interim)
- Stadium: PayPal Park; San Jose, California
- Major League Soccer: Conference: 14th Overall: 26th
- MLS Cup Playoffs: Did not qualify
- U.S. Open Cup: Round of 16
- Heritage Cup: Winner
- Highest home attendance: 16,146 (2/26 v. NSH)
- Lowest home attendance: 10,394 (4/16 v. NSH)
- Average home league attendance: 15,260
- Biggest win: SJ 5–0 BCFC (Apr 19, USOC)
- Biggest defeat: CIN 6–0 SJ (Sep 10, MLS)
Home colors	Away colors

The 2022 season was the San Jose Earthquakes' 40th year of existence, their 25th season in Major League Soccer and their 15th consecutive season in the top-flight of American soccer.

== Roster ==
As of July 5, 2022

No.	Pos.	Nation	Player
1	GK	USA	JT Marcinkowski (HG)
3	DF	FRA	Paul Marie
5	MF	ARG	Eric Remedi
6	MF	USA	Shea Salinas
10	FW	ARG	Cristian Espinoza (DP)
11	FW	USA	Jeremy Ebobisse
12	GK	USA	Matt Bersano
13	DF	BRA	Nathan
14	MF	USA	Jackson Yueill
15	DF	USA	Tanner Beason
16	MF	USA	Jack Skahan
17	MF	SVK	Ján Greguš
18	MF	GHA	George Asomani
19	MF	SOM	Siad Haji (GA)
20	MF	USA	Will Richmond (HG)
21	MF	GUA	Gilbert Fuentes (HG)
22	DF	USA	Tommy Thompson (HG)
23	DF	SWE	Oskar Ågren
25	FW	BFA	Ousseni Bouda (GA)
27	DF	PER	Marcos López
28	FW	USA	Benji Kikanovic
30	MF	USA	Niko Tsakiris (HG)
35	MF	CPV	Jamiro Monteiro (DP)
41	GK	MEX	Emi Ochoa (HG)
44	FW	MEX	Cade Cowell (HG)
77	DF	USA	Casey Walls (HG)
93	MF	BRA	Judson
99	MF	USA	Cruz Medina (HG)

== Transfers ==
=== In ===
No.	Pos.	Player	Previous club	Fee/notes	Date
17	MF	(Slovakia) Ján Greguš	(United States) Minnesota United FC	Supplemental Draft pick	January 6, 2022
20	DF	(United States) Will Richmond	(United States) Stanford Cardinal	Homegrown Signing	January 10, 2022
25	MF	(Burkina Faso) Ousseni Bouda	(United States) Stanford Cardinal	2022 MLS SuperDraft pick	January 11, 2022
30	DF	(United States) Niko Tsakiris	(United States) San Jose Earthquakes academy	Homegrown Signing	January 13, 2022
80	DF	(Costa Rica) Francisco Calvo	(United States) Chicago Fire FC	Free transfer	January 26, 2022
35	MF	(Cape Verde) Jamiro Monteiro	(United States) Philadelphia Union	Trade	February 14, 2022
23	DF	(Sweden) Oskar Ågren	(United States) Clemson Tigers	2022 MLS SuperDraft pick	February 18, 2022
99	MF	(United States) Cruz Medina	(United States) San Jose Earthquakes academy	Homegrown Signing	June 3, 2022
26	DF	(Brazil) Rodrigues	(Brazil) Grêmio	Loan	August 6, 2022
29	MF	(Equatorial Guinea) Carlos Akapo	(Spain) Cádiz CF	Free transfer	August 5, 2022
21	DF	(Peru) Miguel Trauco	(France) AS Saint-Étienne	Free transfer	September 2, 2022

=== Out ===
No.	Pos.	Player	Transferred to	Fee/notes	Date
2	DF	(Argentina) Luciano Abecasis	(Argentina) Banfield	Option declined	December 1, 2021
29	DF	(United States) Jacob Akanyirige	(United States) Rochester New York FC	Option declined	December 1, 2021
4	DF	(Mexico) Oswaldo Alanís	(Mexico) C.D. Guadalajara	End of Loan	December 1, 2021
8	MF	(El Salvador) Eric Calvillo	(United States) El Paso Locomotive FC	Option declined	December 1, 2021
7	MF	(Mexico) Carlos Fierro	(Mexico) FC Juárez	Option declined	December 1, 2021
25	FW	(Argentina) Andrés Ríos	(Argentina) Club Atlético Aldosivi	Option declined	December 1, 2021
5	MF	(Argentina) Daniel Vega	Retirement		December 1, 2021
—	FW	(United States) Thomas Williamson	(United States) Minnesota United FC 2	Option declined	December 1, 2021
8	FW	(United States) Chris Wondolowski	Retirement		December 1, 2021
9	MF	(Mexico) Javier López	(Mexico) C.D. Guadalajara	End of Loan	July 4, 2022
17	MF	(Costa Rica) Francisco Calvo	(Turkey) Konyaspor	Undisclosed Fee	July 7, 2022
27	MF	(Peru) Marcos López	(Netherlands) Feyenoord	Undisclosed Fee	August 8, 2022

== Competitions ==
=== Major League Soccer ===
==== Standings ====
Pos	Team	Pld	W	L	T	GF	GA	GD	Pts
10	Colorado Rapids	34	11	13	10	46	57	−11	43
11	Seattle Sounders FC	34	12	17	5	47	46	+1	41
12	Sporting Kansas City	34	11	16	7	42	54	−12	40
13	Houston Dynamo FC	34	10	18	6	43	56	−13	36
14	San Jose Earthquakes	34	8	15	11	52	69	−17	35

Source: MLS
Rules for classification: 1) points; 2) total wins; 3) total goal differential; 4) total goals scored; 5) fewer disciplinary points; 6) away goal differential; 7) away goals scored; 8) home goals differential; 9) home goals scored; 10) coin toss (2 clubs tied) or drawing of lots (≥3 clubs tied)

==== Match results ====
February 26 1	San Jose Earthquakes	1–3	New York Red Bulls	San Jose, California
6:00PM EST	J. López 69'	Report	Klimala 45+1'; Fernandez 72'; Barlow 90+2'	Stadium: PayPal Park; Attendance: 18,000; Referee: Drew Fischer

March 5 2	San Jose Earthquakes	3–3	Columbus Crew	San Jose, California
2:30 PM PST	Espinoza 9' (pen.); Remedi (yellow card) 16'; Monteiro (red card) 33'; Judson (yellow card) 75'; Kikanovic (yellow card) 79'; Calvo 84' 90+6'	Report	Zelarayán 40' 73' (yellow card) 90'; Santos (yellow card) 45+6'; Zardes 68'; Igbekeme (yellow card) 83'; Anibaba (yellow card) 90+5'	Stadium: PayPal Park; Attendance: 12,888; Referee: Guido Gonzales Jr.

March 12 3	Philadelphia Union	2–0	San Jose Earthquakes	Chester, Pennsylvania
7:30 PM EDT	Burke 23'; Santos (yellow card) 27'; Gazdag (yellow card) 43' (goal) 58' (pen.); Harriel (yellow card) 62'	Report	Espinoza (yellow card) 11'; Remedi (yellow card) 26'; Bouda (yellow card) 90+2'	Stadium: Subaru Park; Referee: Victor Rivas

March 19 4	Minnesota United FC	1–0	San Jose Earthquakes	St. Paul, Minnesota
5:00 PM PDT	Trapp (yellow card) 39'; Amarilla 32' (yellow card) 70'	Report	M. Lopez (yellow card) 10'; Calvo (yellow card) 43'; Cowell (yellow card) 83'	Stadium: Allianz Field; Attendance: 18,685; Referee: Pierre-Luc Lauziere

April 2 5	San Jose Earthquakes	2–2	Austin FC	San Jose, California
4:30 PM PDT	Marie (yellow card) 31'; Ebobisse 70' (pen.); Cowell 72'; Calvo (yellow card) 79'; Bouda (yellow card) 85'	Report	Urruti 11'; Fagúndez (yellow card) 42'; Driussi 52' (pen.); Pereira (yellow card) 71'; Redes (yellow card) 77'	Stadium: PayPal Park; Attendance: 13,062; Referee: Alex Chilowicz

April 9 6	Houston Dynamo FC	4–3	San Jose Earthquakes	Houston, Texas
5:30 PM PDT	Ferreira 8' (yellow card) 27' (goal) 68'; Quintero (yellow card) 18' (goal) 43'; Hadebe 57' (yellow card) 58'; Picault (yellow card) 63'; Cerén (yellow card) 89'; Bartlow (yellow card) 90+2'	Report	Marie (yellow card) 20'; M. López (yellow card) 22'; Ebobisse 25' 28'; Thompson 77'; Yueill (yellow card) 90+1'	Stadium: PNC Stadium; Attendance: 15,414; Referee: Ismir Pekmic

April 16 7	San Jose Earthquakes	2–2	Nashville SC	San Jose, California
10:30 PM PDT	Cowell (yellow card) 21'; Ebobisse 52', 72'	Report	Mukhtar 38', 63'; Lovitz (yellow card) 51'; Haakenson (yellow card) 90+5'	Stadium: PayPal Park; Attendance: 10,394; Referee: Timothy Ford

April 23 8	San Jose Earthquakes	4–3	Seattle Sounders FC	San Jose, California
7:30 PM PDT	Nathan (yellow card) 11'; Espinoza 45+2' 64' 90+4'; Yueill 65'; Remedi (yellow card) 67'; Calvo (yellow card) 67'	Report	Lodeiro 14'; Roldan 20'; Morris 57'; Vargas (yellow card) 83'	Stadium: PayPal Park; Attendance: 12,467; Referee: Ted Unkel

May 1 9	New York City FC	3–0	San Jose Earthquakes	New York, New York
10:00AM PDT	Parks 74'; Callens (yellow card) 77'; Pereira 78'; Castellanos (yellow card) 80'; Rodríguez (yellow card) 82'; Gloster 88'	Report		Stadium: Yankee Stadium; Attendance: 17,174; Referee: Guido Gonzales, Jr.

May 7 10	San Jose Earthquakes	1–0	Colorado Rapids	San Jose, California
7:00PM PDT	Nathan 64'; Calvo (yellow card) 73'	Report		Stadium: PayPal Park; Attendance: 14,077; Referee: Tori Penso

May 14 11	Vancouver Whitecaps FC	3–3	San Jose Earthquakes	Vancouver, British Columbia
4:00 PM (PDT)	Godoy (yellow card) 5', (goal) 90+1'; Teibert (yellow card) 14'; Dájome (yellow card) 33'; Cavallini 52'; Raposo 75'	Report	Nathan (yellow card) 27'; Monteiro 62'; Ebobisse 73', 81'	Stadium: BC Place; Attendance: 15,087; Referee: Timothy Ford

May 18 12	San Jose Earthquakes	3–2	Portland Timbers	San Jose, California
7:30 PM PDT	Yueill 31'; Monteiro 44', 80'; Remedi (yellow card) 59'; M. Lopez (yellow card) 66'	Report	Paredes 18'; Župarić (yellow card) 35'; Tuiloma 56'; Rasmussen (yellow card) 70'; Williamson (yellow card) 90+5'	Stadium: PayPal Park; Attendance: 11,788; Referee: Lukasz Szpala

May 22 13	San Jose Earthquakes	1–1	Sporting Kansas City	San Jose, California
7:30 PM PDT	Yueill 46'; Marie (yellow card) 88'	Report	Russell 44'; Espinoza (yellow card) 58'; Rosell (yellow card) 74'	Stadium: PayPal Park; Attendance: 14,233; Referee: Pierre-Luc Lauziere

May 28 14	Los Angeles FC	3–2	San Jose Earthquakes	Los Angeles
3:00 PM PT	Arango 7' (pen.); Hollingshead 13'; Rodríguez (yellow card) 19', (goal) 47'; Musovski (yellow card) 73'; Acosta (yellow card) 77'; Crisostomo (yellow card) 90+4'	Report	Ebobisse 16', 31'; Espinoza (yellow card) 17'	Stadium: Banc of California Stadium; Attendance: 22,007; Referee: Ismail Elfath

June 11 15	Nashville SC	0–0	San Jose Earthquakes	Nashville, Tennessee
5:00 PM PDT	Anunga (yellow card) 74'	Report	Remedi (yellow card) 67'; Judson (yellow card) 83'; Marie (yellow card) 89'	Stadium: Geodis Park; Attendance: 28,672; Referee: Allen Chapman

June 18 16	Real Salt Lake	2–0	San Jose Earthquakes	Sandy, Utah
7:30 PM PDT	Silva 22'; Schmitt (yellow card) 31'; Savarino 81'; Luiz (yellow card) 84'	Report	Espinoza (yellow card) 68'; Nathan (yellow card) 79'	Stadium: Rio Tinto Stadium; Attendance: 20,517; Referee: Alex Chilowicz

July 3 18	San Jose Earthquakes	2–1	Chicago Fire FC	San Jose, California
6:00 PM PDT	Kikanovic 47', (yellow card) 73', (goal) 87'; Marie (yellow card) 63'; López (yellow card) 75'	Report	Mueller (yellow card) 27'; Giménez (yellow card) 43'; Gutiérrez 90+5'	Stadium: PayPal Park; Attendance: 13,224; Referee: Victor Rivas

July 9 19	Toronto FC	2–2	San Jose Earthquakes	Toronto, Ontario
4:30 PM EDT	Kerr 71', (yellow card) 86'; Osorio 75'	Report	Ebobisse 26'; Skahan 90+2'; Yueill (yellow card) 90+5'	Stadium: BMO Field; Attendance: 27,149; Referee: Fotis Bazakos

July 13 20	LA Galaxy	2–3	San Jose Earthquakes	Carson, California
7:00PM PST, FS1	Grandsir (yellow card) 33'; Joveljić 48', 88'	Report	Espinoza 13' (pen.); Ebobisse 14'; López 40', (yellow card) 41'	Stadium: Dignity Health Sports Park; Attendance: 18,453; Referee: Allen Chapman

July 17 21	San Jose Earthquakes	1–2	Houston Dynamo	San Jose, California
8:30 PM CDT	Monteiro (yellow card) 45'; Yueill 53'	Report	Parker (yellow card) 28'; Vera (yellow card) 43'; Ferreira 71'; Úlfarsson 76'; Picault (yellow card) 90'	Stadium: PayPal Park; Attendance: 13,445; Referee: Tim Ford

July 23 22	Portland Timbers	2–1	San Jose Earthquakes	Portland, Oregon
7:30 PM PDT	Van Rankin (yellow card) 39'; Y. Chará (yellow card) 40'; Bravo (yellow card) 41'; Niezgoda 53'; Asprilla (yellow card) 67', (goal) 71'	Report	Kikanovic 42'; Nathan (yellow card) 49'; Remedi (yellow card) 53'; Yueill (yellow card) 78'	Stadium: Providence Park; Attendance: 23,795; Referee: Jon Freemon

July 30 23	San Jose Earthquakes	2–2	Real Salt Lake	San Jose, California
7:00 PM PDT	Espinoza 12' (pen.), (yellow card) 45+2'; Ebobisse 62'; Yueill (yellow card) 85'; Greguš (yellow card) 90+4'; M. López (yellow card) 90+7' (yellow-red card) 90+7'	Report	Glad (yellow card) 12'; MacMath (yellow card) 14'; Löffelsend 21'; Chang (yellow card) 37'; Savarino 90+5', (yellow card) 90+6'	Stadium: PayPal Park; Attendance: 12,411; Referee: Nima Saghafi

August 3 24	San Jose Earthquakes	0–1	Inter Miami CF	San Jose, California
7:30PM PDT		Report	Mota 12'; Yedlin (yellow card) 73'	Stadium: PayPal Park; Attendance: 11,806; Referee: Mark Allatin

August 6 25	Austin FC	3–3	San Jose Earthquakes	Austin, Texas
6:00 PM PDT	Cascante 6'; Driussi (yellow card) 23', (goal) 26', 44'; Stuver (yellow card) 60'	Report	Kikanovic 8'; Marie 20'; Beason (yellow card) 39'; Yueill (yellow card) 84'; Ebobisse 88'	Stadium: Q2 Stadium; Attendance: 20,738; Referee: Lukasz Szpala

August 13 26	FC Dallas	4–1	San Jose Earthquakes	Frisco, Texas
6:00 PM PDT	Ferreira 3', 41'; Farfan 20'; Cerrillo (yellow card) 45'; Velasco 57'; Pomykal (yellow card) 67'	Report	Ebobisse 60'; Nathan (yellow card) 90+1'	Stadium: Toyota Stadium; Attendance: 15,106; Referee: Victor Rivas

August 20 27	San Jose Earthquakes	2–1	Los Angeles FC	San Jose, California
7:00 PM PDT	Kikanovic 14', (yellow card) 60'; Thompson (yellow card) 30'; Nathan (yellow card) 31'; Remedi (yellow card) 74'; Cowell 77'	Report	Ibeagha (yellow card) 42'; Opoku 54'; Acosta (yellow card) 67'; Sánchez (yellow card) 67' (yellow-red card) 79'; Cifuentes (yellow card) 86'; Arango (yellow card) 90+6'	Stadium: PayPal Park; Attendance: 18,000; Referee: Michael Radchuk

August 27 28	Sporting Kansas City	1–0	San Jose Earthquakes	Kansas City, Kansas
6:55 PM CDT	Sallói 10'; Sweat (yellow card) 42'; Agada (yellow card) 45'; Fontàs (yellow card) 88'	Report	Beason (yellow card) 57'; Ågren (yellow card) 90+1'	Stadium: Children's Mercy Park; Attendance: 18,241; Referee: Guido Gonzales, Jr.

September 4 29	San Jose Earthquakes	2–0	Vancouver Whitecaps FC	San Jose, California
6:30 PM (PDT)	Ebobisse 4'; Monteiro 34'; Kikanović (yellow card) 90+1'	Report	Cubas (yellow card) 31'; Gauld (yellow card) 43'; Blackmon (yellow card) 62'	Stadium: PayPal Park; Attendance: 13,211; Referee: Rosendo Mendoza

September 10 30	FC Cincinnati	6–0	San Jose Earthquakes	Cincinnati, Ohio
4:30PM PDT	Barreal 45'; Brenner 47', 90', 90+5' (pen.), (yellow card) 90'; Cameron (yellow card) 57'; Acosta 71' (pen.); Kubo 77'	Report	Monteiro (yellow card) 8'; Nathan (yellow card) 46'	Stadium: TQL Stadium; Attendance: 22,557; Referee: Ismir Pekmic

September 14 31	Colorado Rapids	2–1	San Jose Earthquakes	Commerce City, Colorado
7:00 PM PDT	Rubio 21'; Rosenberry 77'; Warner (yellow card) 90+4'	Report	Nathan 37'; Remedi (yellow card) 48'; Judson (yellow card) 90'	Stadium: Dick's Sporting Goods Park; Attendance: 11,938; Referee: Pierre-Luc Lauziere

September 17 32	San Jose Earthquakes	1–1	FC Dallas	San Jose, California
7:30PM PDT	Ebobisse 24' (pen.); Nathan (yellow card) 58'	Report	Obrian (yellow card) 12' (goal) 16'; Farfan (yellow card) 34'; Martínez (yellow card) 60'; Cerrillo (yellow card) 68'; Arriola (red card) 83'	Stadium: PayPal Park; Attendance: 12,355; Referee: Drew Fischer

September 24 17	San Jose Earthquakes	2–3	LA Galaxy	Stanford, California
7:00PM PDT	Judson (yellow card) 29'; Tsakiris (yellow card) 47'; Espinoza 74' (pen.); Remedi (yellow card) 83'; Nathan 90+5'	Report	Hernández 12', 69', (yellow card) 31'; Brugman 42'; Grandsir (yellow card) 56'; Bond (yellow card) 73'	Stadium: Stanford Stadium; Attendance: 44,200; Referee: Alex Chilowicz
Note: This match originally scheduled for June 25, was postponed to September 24, due to issues involving a power outage in the area.

October 1 33	San Jose Earthquakes	2–0	Minnesota United FC	San Jose, California
9:00 PM CT	Yueill (yellow card) 9'; Salinas 52', (yellow card) 53'; Kikanovic 71', (yellow card) 86'	Report	Arriaga (yellow card) 10'; Amarilla (yellow card) 23'; Boxall (yellow card) 50'	Stadium: PayPal Park; Attendance: 15,709; Referee: Nima Saghafi

October 9 34	Seattle Sounders FC	2–2	San Jose Earthquakes	Seattle, Washington
2:00 PM PDT	Lodeiro 1', 49'; Rusnák (yellow card) 42'	Report	Ebobisse 4'; Rodrigues (yellow card) 52'; Cowell 75'	Stadium: Lumen Field; Attendance: 33,910; Referee: Marcos de Oliveira

=== U.S. Open Cup ===
April 19 Third Round	San Jose Earthquakes (MLS) (California)	5–0	(California) Bay Cities FC (NISA)	San Jose, California
7:30 pm PDT	Skahan 25'; Marie 36'; Cowell 59' (pen.); Taskiris 83'; Bouda 88'	Report	Turgeon (yellow card) 16'	Stadium: PayPal Park; Attendance: 6,598; Referee: Malik Badawi

May 11 Round of 32	Seattle Sounders FC (MLS) (Washington (state))	2–2 (a.e.t.) (9–10 p)	(California) San Jose Earthquakes (MLS)	Tukwila, Washington
7:00 PM (PDT)	Medranda (yellow card) 26' (goal) 54'; Ragen (yellow card) 63'; Montero (yellow card) 68' (goal) 77'; Adeniran (yellow card) 95'; Cissoko (yellow card) 120+2'	Report	Skahan 10' (pen.) (yellow card) 30'; Kikanovic (yellow card) 48'; Calvo (yellow card) 49'; Cowell 50'; Ågren (yellow card) 62'; Beason (yellow card) 72'	Stadium: Starfire Sports Complex; Attendance: 3,773; Referee: Esad Omanovic
	Penalties
	Montero (penalty scored); Cissoko (penalty scored); Chú (penalty missed); Teves (penalty scored); Adeniran (penalty scored); Rowe (penalty scored); Ragen (penalty scored); Atencio (penalty scored); Vargas (penalty scored); Nouhou (penalty scored); Cleveland (penalty missed)		(penalty scored) Espinoza; (penalty missed) Yueill; (penalty scored) Ebobisse; (penalty scored) Calvo; (penalty scored) Monteiro; (penalty scored) M. López; (penalty scored) Beason; (penalty scored) Skahan; (penalty scored) Ågren; (penalty scored) Remedi; (penalty scored) Bersano

May 25 Round of 16	Sacramento Republic FC (USLC) (California)	2–0	(California) San Jose Earthquakes (MLS)	Sacramento, California
7:30 pm PDT	Luis Felipe 28'; López 83'	Report		Stadium: Heart Health Park; Attendance: 11,569; Referee: Elijio Arreguin
