= Timo Werner =

German footballer (born 1996)

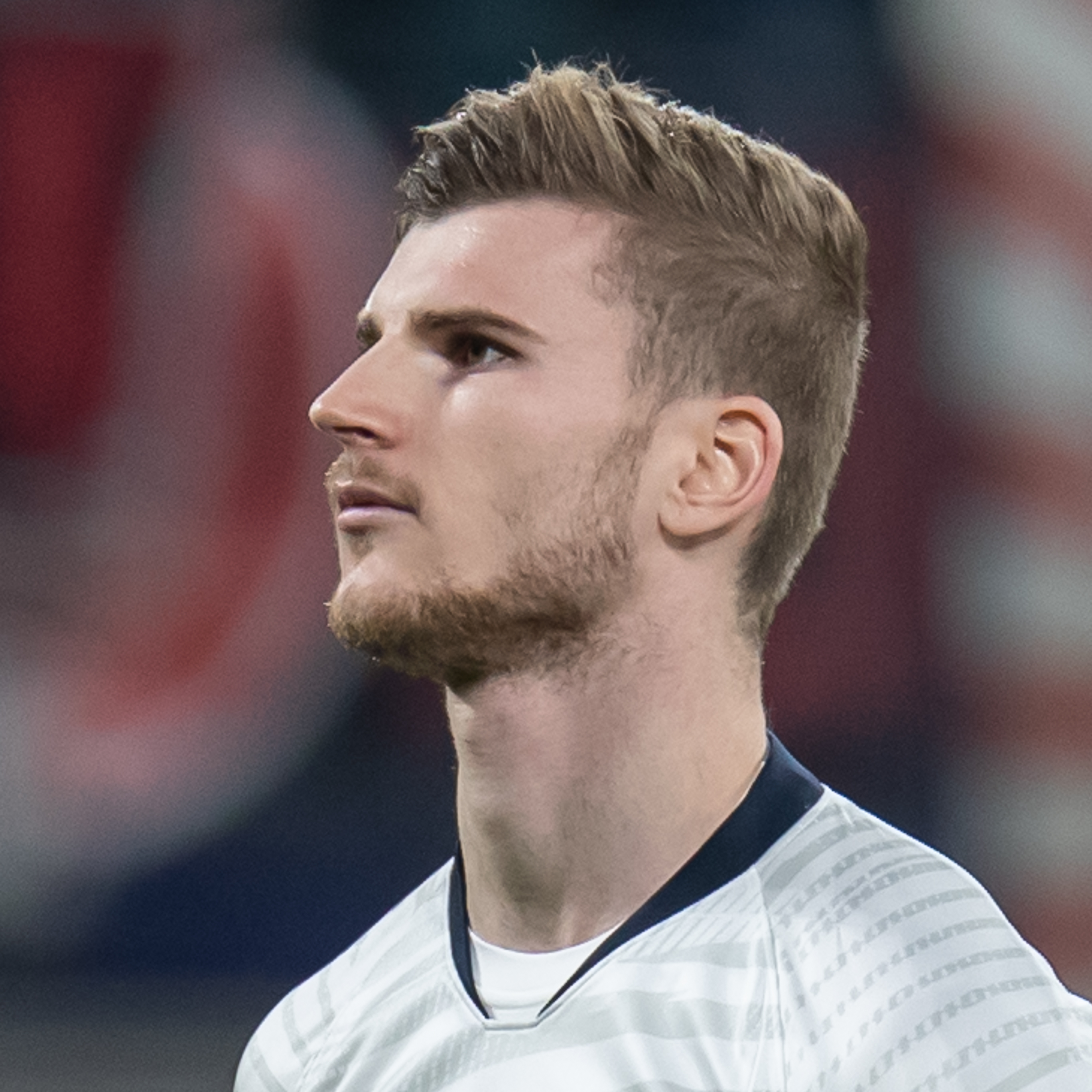
- Werner with RB Leipzig in 2020

Personal information
- Full name: Timo Werner
- Date of birth: 6 March 1996 (age 30)
- Place of birth: Stuttgart, Germany
- Height: 1.80 m (5 ft 11 in)
- Position: Forward

Team information
- Current team: San Jose Earthquakes
- Number: 11

Youth career
- TSV Steinhaldenfeld
- 2002–2013: VfB Stuttgart

Senior career*
Years	Team	Apps	(Gls)
2013–2016	VfB Stuttgart	95	(13)
2014	VfB Stuttgart II	1	(1)
2016–2020	RB Leipzig	127	(78)
2020–2022	Chelsea	56	(10)
2022–2026	RB Leipzig	38	(11)
2024–2025	→ Tottenham Hotspur (loan)	31	(2)
2026–	San Jose Earthquakes	21	(6)

International career^{‡}
2010–2011	Germany U15	4	(3)
2011–2012	Germany U16	5	(2)
2012–2013	Germany U17	18	(16)
2013–2015	Germany U19	14	(10)
2015–2016	Germany U21	7	(3)
2017–2023	Germany	57	(24)
Medal record
Men's football
Representing Germany
FIFA Confederations Cup
Winner	2017
- * Club domestic league appearances and goals as of 03:57, 8 November 2026 (UTC) ‡ National team caps and goals as of 20:40, 28 March 2023 (UTC)

Timo Werner (German pronunciation: [ˈtiːmoː ˈvɛʁnɐ]; born 6 March 1996) is a German professional footballer who plays as a forward for Major League Soccer club San Jose Earthquakes.

Werner began his senior club career in 2013 playing for VfB Stuttgart, becoming the club's youngest debutant and youngest goalscorer. He signed for RB Leipzig in 2016, aged 20, for a then club record transfer fee of €10 million. With Leipzig, he set the record as the youngest player to reach 150 and 200 appearances in the Bundesliga. Werner also finished as the league's second highest goalscorer in the 2019–20 season. After becoming Leipzig's all-time top goalscorer, Werner departed to Chelsea in 2020 for a reported fee worth €50 million, winning the UEFA Champions League in his first season at the club. He later returned to Leipzig in August 2022 for a reported fee of £25.3 million.

A German international, Werner was a prolific goalscorer at youth international level for Germany, scoring 34 goals in 48 appearances across the various age group levels. Werner made his senior debut in 2017 and helped Germany win the 2017 FIFA Confederations Cup, winning the Golden Boot as the tournament's highest goalscorer. He also represented Germany at the 2018 FIFA World Cup and UEFA Euro 2020.

== Early and personal life ==
Timo Werner was born on 6 March 1996 in Stuttgart, Baden-Württemberg, to Günther Schuh, a footballer, and Sabine Werner.

In June 2025, Werner married Paula Lense in a ceremony in Mallorca.

== Club career ==
=== VfB Stuttgart ===
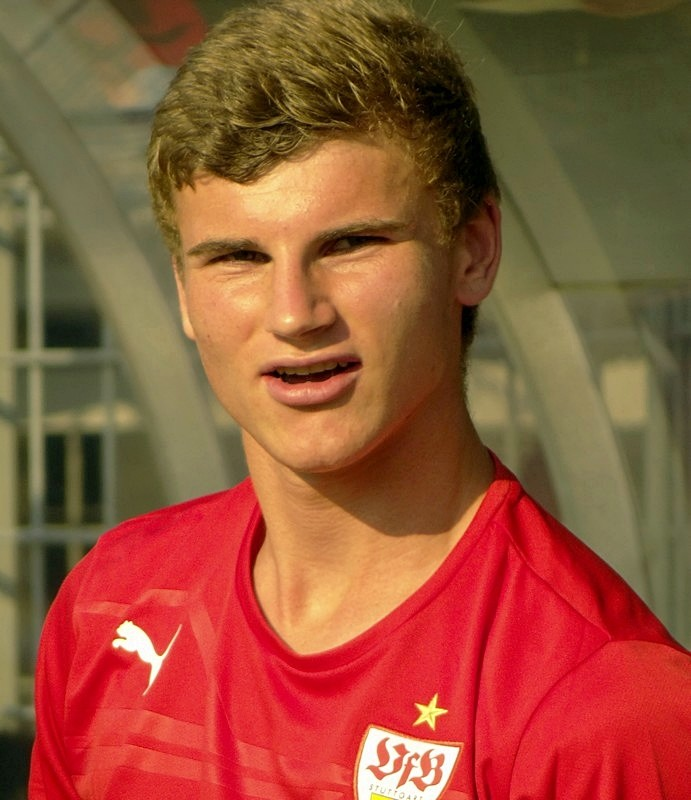
Werner with VfB Stuttgart in 2013

Werner played for TSV Steinhaldenfeld before joining VfB Stuttgart's academy in 2002. During the 2012–13 season, he was promoted to the U-19 team despite only being 16-years old at the time. He scored 24 goals that season and was rewarded for his form when he won the Gold U-17 Fritz Walter Medal in 2013.

Werner made his senior debut later that year in a 2013–14 UEFA Europa League qualifying phase match against Botev Plovdiv. Upon doing so, he became the youngest player to ever play in an official match for Stuttgart at the age of 17 years, four months and 25 days, breaking the record previously held by Gerhard Poschner. In the following weeks he also became Stuttgart's youngest ever player in the Bundesliga and in the DFB-Pokal, and youngest ever goalscorer after netting his first goal for the club against Eintracht Frankfurt. He broke another record on 10 November when he scored a brace in a 3–1 win over SC Freiburg, thereby becoming the youngest player in Bundesliga history to score two goals in one game.

On his 18th birthday, Werner signed a professional contract until June 2018 with Stuttgart. He went on to score 13 goals in 95 league appearances, during which time he became the youngest player to make 50 Bundesliga appearances in the competition's history. The record was later broken by Kai Havertz in 2018. Stuttgart were relegated in May 2016 which prompted him to join newly promoted club RB Leipzig the following month.

=== RB Leipzig ===
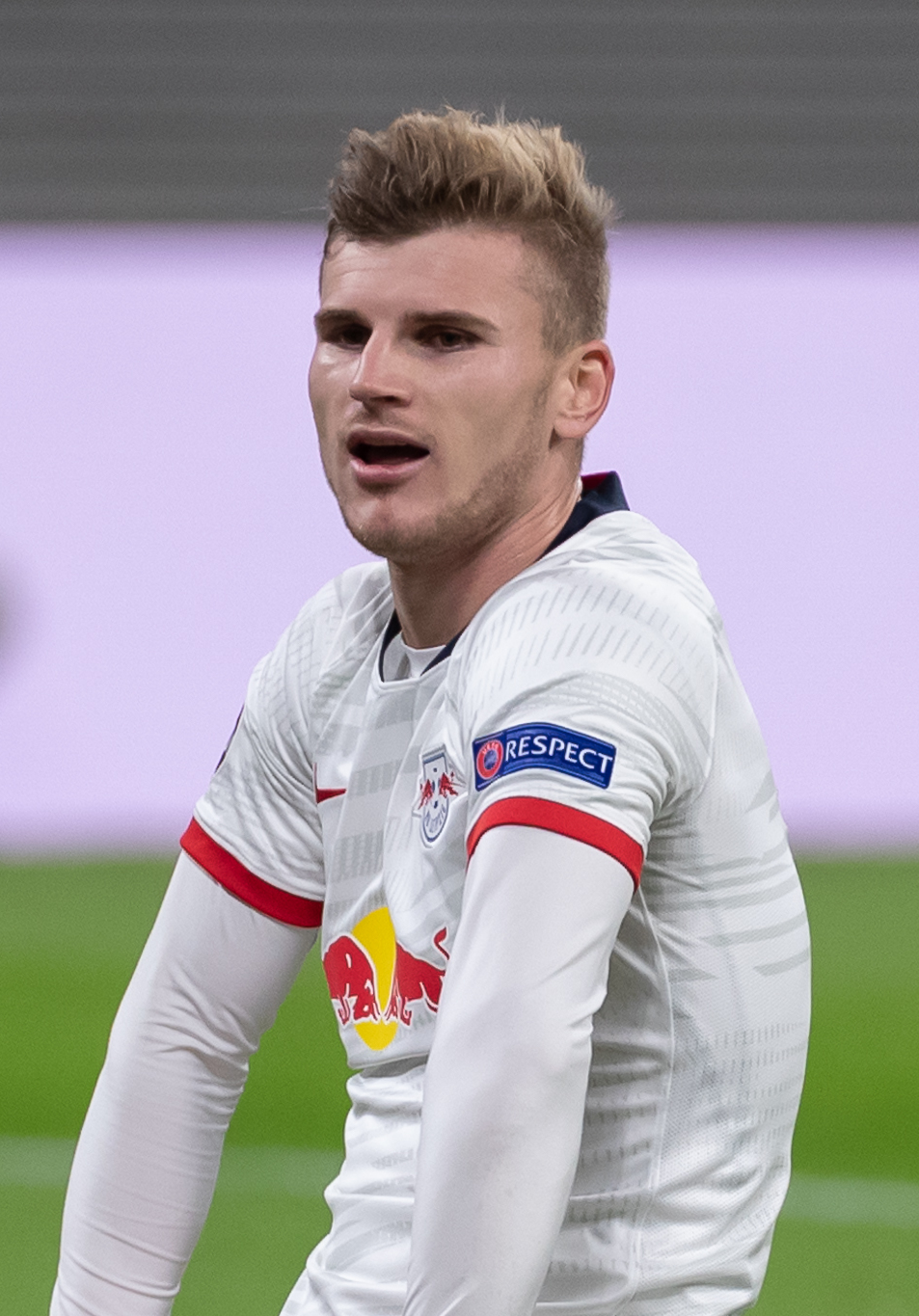
Werner playing for RB Leipzig in 2019

On 11 June 2016, Werner agreed to a four-year contract with RB Leipzig for a reported transfer fee of €10 million, the largest in the club's history. He became the youngest player to play in 100 Bundesliga matches when he appeared in a fixture against 1. FC Köln at the age of 20 years and 203 days on 26 September 2016. In doing so, he broke the record previously held by Julian Draxler by 22 days, although he was again surpassed by Havertz in 2019. Werner ended the 2016–17 Bundesliga season with 21 goals, making him the leading German goalscorer in the division, and helped RB Leipzig qualify for the UEFA Champions League for the first time in the club's history.

In a match against his former club Stuttgart in March 2018, Werner became the youngest player to reach the milestone of 150 Bundesliga appearances, eclipsing the record previously held by Charly Körbel. Later that month, he helped Leipzig defeat Bayern Munich for the first time ever when he scored the winning goal in a 2–1 victory. He ultimately went on to score 13 goals and record seven assists for the season.

On 7 October 2018, Werner scored his 50th Bundesliga goal in a 6–0 league win over 1. FC Nürnberg. The result was also RB Leipzig's biggest ever win in the competition. The following month, he scored a twice in a 3–0 league win over Hertha BSC and in doing so recorded the tenth competitive brace of his career. He reached the milestone of 10 league goals for the season on 16 December after scoring twice in a 4–1 win over Mainz 05. His double against Mainz was his fifth brace of the campaign, meaning that by that stage of season every time he scored in a match he went on to score a brace. He made his 100th appearance for RB Leipzig when he started in a 4–0 league win over Fortuna Düsseldorf on 27 January 2019. He became the first player to score 50 Bundesliga goals for the club on 4 May when he scored once and assisted another in a 3–3 draw with Mainz.

Werner scored his first Bundesliga hat-trick in a 3–1 away victory against Borussia Mönchengladbach on 30 August 2019. He made his 100th league appearance for the club on 5 October, during a 1–1 draw with Bayer Leverkusen. At the start of the following month, he scored another hat-trick and recorded three assists to guide Leipzig to an 8–0 win over Mainz, their biggest-ever win in the Bundesliga. On 23 November, he became the youngest ever player to reach the milestone of 200 Bundesliga appearances.

In his final match as a Leipzig player on 27 June 2020, Werner scored both of his side's goals in a 2–1 win away to Augsburg. Hence, he finished his tenure at Leipzig with 95 goals, overtaking Daniel Frahn to become the club's record goalscorer.

=== Chelsea ===
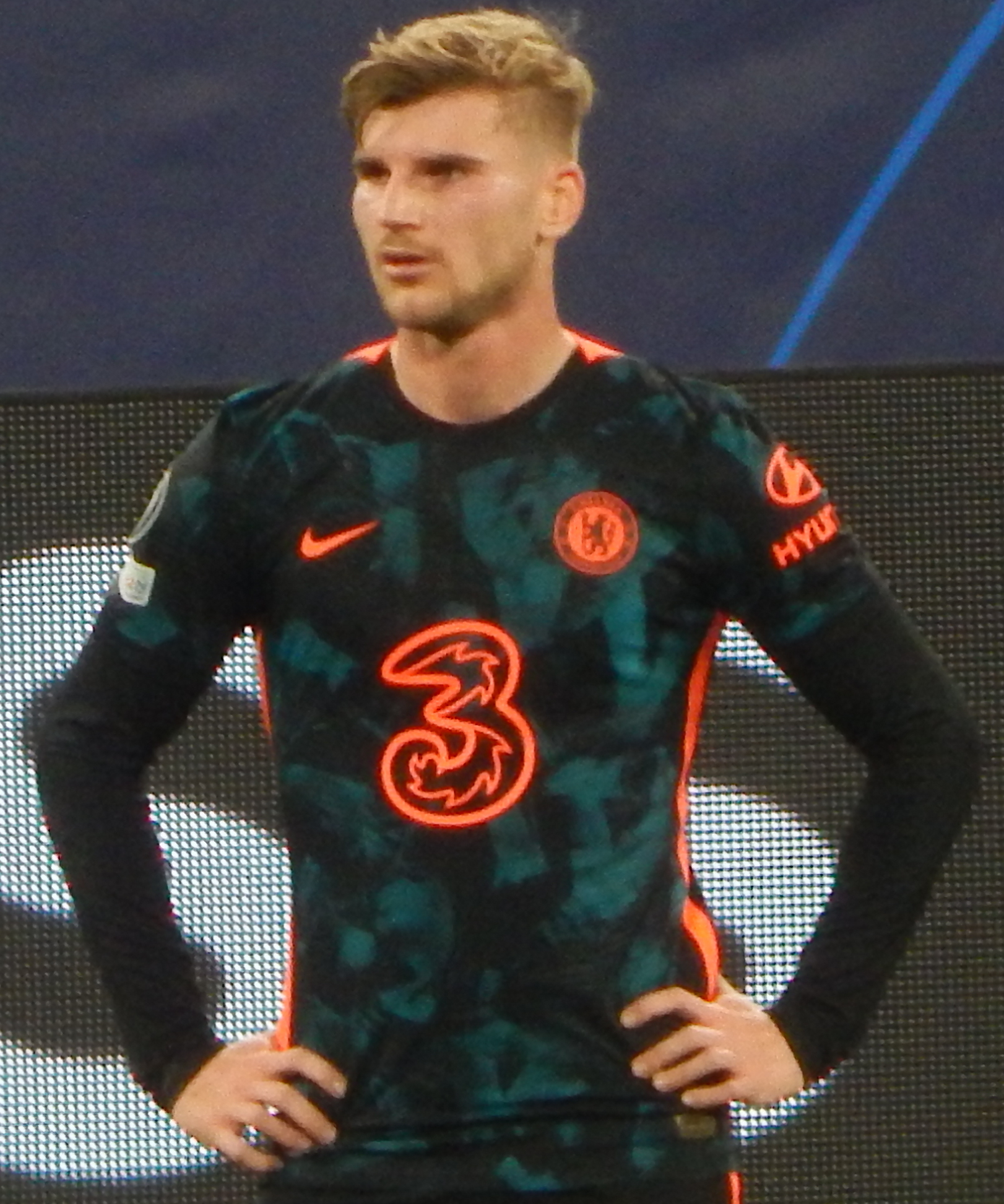
Werner playing for Chelsea in 2021

On 18 June 2020, Werner agreed to sign for Premier League club Chelsea, who activated his £47.5 million release clause, on a five-year contract. He joined the club on 1 July. He made his league debut with the club on 14 September, in a 3–1 away win against Brighton & Hove Albion. On 29 September, Werner scored his first goal for Chelsea in a 1–1 draw against Tottenham Hotspur which they lost 4–5 on penalties in the fourth round of the EFL Cup. On 17 October, Werner scored his first Premier League goals with a brace and assisted Kai Havertz for the third as Chelsea drew Southampton 3–3 at home. He scored his first Champions League goal for Chelsea, a penalty against Russian side Krasnodar on 28 October.

On 15 February 2021, Werner scored in a 2–0 win over Newcastle United in the Premier League and ended his 14-game goal drought in the league. On 5 May, he scored the first goal in a 2–0 win over Real Madrid, to help his team book a place in the Champions League final against fellow Premier League side Manchester City. On 29 May, he won his first-ever Champions League after Chelsea defeated Manchester City in the final in Porto.

Werner started the 2021–22 season in the 2021 UEFA Super Cup match against Villarreal on 11 August 2021, and following a 1–1 draw after extra time, Chelsea won the penalty shoot-out 6–5. He scored his first goal of the season during a Carabao Cup clash against Aston Villa. The match ended 1–1 after regular time and Chelsea eventually won 4–3 on penalties. His first Premier League goal of the season came on 2 October in a 3–1 win against Southampton. On 8 December 2021, Werner scored the fastest goal for Chelsea in their Champions League history, after only 82 seconds away to Zenit Saint Petersburg. He also scored a second goal in the 3–3 draw away to Zenit. On 12 April 2022, he scored the third goal for Chelsea to be 3–0 ahead away to Real Madrid in the second leg of the Champions League quarter-finals; however, Real Madrid managed to score a goal later on, then another goal in extra time, to qualify eventually to the semi-finals by winning 5–4 on aggregate.

=== Return to RB Leipzig ===
On 9 August 2022, Werner re-signed for Bundesliga club RB Leipzig on a four-year contract for a reported fee of £25.3 million. On 13 August, Werner made his return debut in a 2–2 draw against Köln. He also scored, firing a dipping shot from outside the box at Köln goalkeeper Marvin Schwäbe, who let it slip through his hands to give Leipzig the opener in the 36th minute. On 1 October 2022, Werner scored a brace against Bochum to score his 100th and 101st goals in 169 matches in all competitions for Leipzig. This made him the first player to score a century of goals for the club.

On 2 November 2022, Werner suffered an ankle injury and had to be substituted in Leipzig's 4–0 Champions League victory over Shakhtar Donetsk, which saw him ruled out of the 2022 FIFA World Cup in Qatar for Germany. Werner scored his 100th Bundesliga goal on 15 April 2023 in a 3–2 victory over Augsburg.

==== Loan to Tottenham Hotspur ====
On 9 January 2024, Werner joined Premier League club Tottenham Hotspur on loan until the end of the 2023–24 season, with an option for the transfer to become permanent at the end of the season. He made his debut for the club on 14 January, assisting Rodrigo Bentancur's equaliser in a 2–2 draw against Manchester United at Old Trafford. He scored his first goal for the club on 2 March in a 3–1 home win over Crystal Palace. Werner scored for his second game in a row, netting the final goal in a 4–0 away win over Aston Villa from the bench.

Later that year in late May, Tottenham extended Werner's spell for a season-long loan with an option to buy clause in the region of £8.5 million.

Werner scored his only goal of the 2024–25 season on 30 October during the EFL Cup tie against Manchester City, which Tottenham went on to win 2–1 to advance to the quarter-finals. On 12 January 2025, he suffered a hamstring injury during the FA Cup tie against Tamworth. Since then, Werner was cut from the Europa League playing squad and has made the Tottenham matchday squad on a single occasion, playing 8 minutes of the 1–0 Premier League defeat against Manchester City in February. On 21 May, Werner was awarded Europa League winner's medal after Tottenham beat Manchester United in the final.

Werner's loan spell with Tottenham ended on 31 May 2025. RB Leipzig's top earner, with €10 million-a-year contract running until June 2026, Werner was not part of the club's plans. They wanted him to leave during the summer transfer window, but Werner couldn't agree to terms with clubs that expressed interest. During the 2025–26 season, Werner made the RB Leipzig matchday squad twice, playing a single minute as a substitute in September.

=== San Jose Earthquakes ===
On 29 January 2026, Werner signed for the San Jose Earthquakes in Major League Soccer on a deal until 2028, joining the side as a Designated Player. He scored his first goal for the Earthquakes on 19 April in a 4–1 win over Los Angeles FC. On 25 April 2026, Werner became the first player in the club's history to have at least one goal and one assist in three consecutive matches. Werner was named MLS Player of the Month for April 2026, as he helped San Jose win nine of their opening 10 games, five of which were away games, and recorded four goals and three assists during the month.

== International career ==
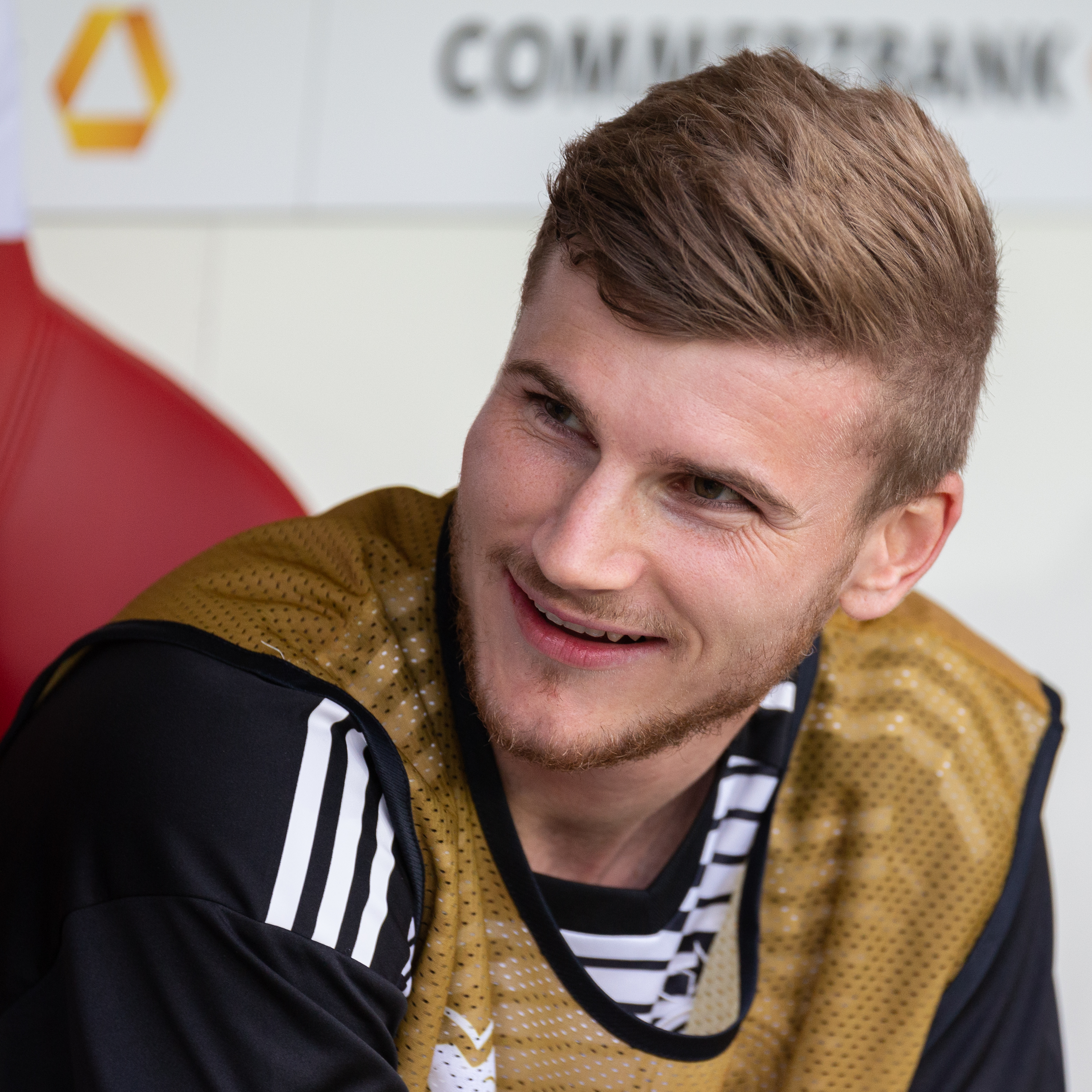
Werner with Germany in 2019

Werner represented Germany at youth level, playing for the U15, U16, U17, U19 and U21 teams, scoring 34 goals in 48 matches overall. In 2010, he scored a hat-trick on his first appearance for Germany U15 in a match against Poland. Two years later, he was a part of the Germany team that finished runner-up in the 2012 UEFA European Under-17 Championship.

Werner was called up to the German senior squad in 2017 by head coach Joachim Löw for the friendly against England and the 2018 World Cup qualification match against Azerbaijan on 22 and 26 March 2017 respectively.

On 17 May 2017, Werner was named in Germany's squad for the 2017 FIFA Confederations Cup held in Russia. He appeared as a substitute for Sandro Wagner in the team's opening game of the tournament against Australia, before scoring his first two international goals when selected to start in Germany's final group match against Cameroon on 25 June. Four days later, Werner scored Germany's third goal in a 4–1 semi-final victory over Mexico. On 2 July 2017, Werner assisted Lars Stindl's tournament winning goal in the 2017 FIFA Confederations Cup Final against Chile. With three goals and two assists, Werner was awarded the tournament's Golden Boot.

On 4 June 2018, Werner was included in Germany's final 23-man squad for the 2018 FIFA World Cup. He made his first World Cup appearance on 17 June, starting in a 1–0 loss to Mexico in Germany's opening match. He featured in both of the remaining group stage fixtures but failed to score as Germany were eliminated at the first round for the first time since 1938.

On 19 May 2021, he was selected to the squad for the UEFA Euro 2020. On 14 June 2022, he scored a brace in a 5–2 win over Italy in the 2022–23 UEFA Nations League in what was Italy's first match where they conceded five or more goals since the 6–1 defeat to Yugoslavia on 12 May 1957. He was not included in the 2022 FIFA World Cup squad due to his ankle injury.

== Style of play ==
Nicknamed "Turbo Timo", Werner is known for his acceleration and pace. A direct, hard-working, and energetic forward, he initially played as a winger in his youth, before being switched to a striker or centre-forward role. An intelligent player, he has been praised in the media for his determination and willingness to drop deep to retrieve the ball or link-up with midfielders. While he is not known for his physicality, aerial game, or hold–up play, he is a prolific goalscorer, possessing excellent movement off the ball, as well as a powerful and accurate shot with his right foot from both inside and outside the penalty area; he usually prefers to cut inside from the left flank and shoot on goal with his stronger foot, although he is also capable of cutting inside from the right and striking with his left.

== Career statistics ==
=== Club ===
As of match played 7 November 2026

Appearances and goals by club, season and competition
Club	Season	League			National cup (Note: Includes DFB-Pokal, FA Cup, U.S. Open Cup)		League cup (Note: Includes EFL Cup)		Continental		Other		Total	
Club	Season	Division	Apps	Goals	Apps	Goals	Apps	Goals	Apps	Goals	Apps	Goals	Apps	Goals
VfB Stuttgart	2013–14	Bundesliga	30	4	2	0	—		2 (Note: Appearances in UEFA Europa League)	0	—		34	4
VfB Stuttgart	2014–15	Bundesliga	32	3	1	0	—		—		—		33	3
VfB Stuttgart	2015–16	Bundesliga	33	6	3	1	—		—		—		36	7
VfB Stuttgart	Total		95	13	6	1	—		2	0	—		103	14
VfB Stuttgart II	2013–14	3. Liga	1	1	—		—		—		—		1	1
RB Leipzig	2016–17	Bundesliga	31	21	1	0	—		—		—		32	21
RB Leipzig	2017–18	Bundesliga	32	13	2	1	—		11 (Note: Six appearances and three goals in UEFA Champions League, five appearances and four goals in UEFA Europa League)	7	—		45	21
RB Leipzig	2018–19	Bundesliga	30	16	4	3	—		3	0	—		37	19
RB Leipzig	2019–20	Bundesliga	34	28	3	2	—		8 (Note: Appearances in UEFA Champions League)	4	—		45	34
RB Leipzig	Total		127	78	10	6	—		22	11	—		159	95
Chelsea	2020–21	Premier League	35	6	4	1	1	1	12	4	—		52	12
Chelsea	2021–22	Premier League	21	4	5	2	4	1	5	4	2 (Note: One appearance in UEFA Super Cup, one appearance in FIFA Club World Cup)	0	37	11
Chelsea	Total		56	10	9	3	5	2	17	8	2	0	89	23
RB Leipzig	2022–23	Bundesliga	27	9	5	5	—		8	2	—		40	16
RB Leipzig	2023–24	Bundesliga	8	2	1	0	—		4	0	1 (Note: Appearance in DFL-Supercup)	0	14	2
RB Leipzig	2025–26	Bundesliga	3	0	0	0	—		—		—		3	0
RB Leipzig	Total		38	11	6	5	—		12	2	1	0	57	18
Tottenham Hotspur (loan)	2023–24	Premier League	13	2	1	0	—		—		—		14	2
Tottenham Hotspur (loan)	2024–25	Premier League	18	0	1	0	3	1	5	0	—		27	1
Tottenham Hotspur (loan)	Total		31	2	2	0	3	1	5	0	—		41	3
San Jose Earthquakes	2026	Major League Soccer	21	6	2	0	—		—		0	0	23	6
Career total			369	121	35	15	8	3	58	21	3	0	473	160

=== International ===
As of match played 28 March 2023

Appearances and goals by national team and year
National team	Year	Apps	Goals
Germany	2017	10	7
Germany	2018	13	2
Germany	2019	6	2
Germany	2020	6	4
Germany	2021	12	6
Germany	2022	8	3
Germany	2023	2	0
Total		57	24

As of match played 28 March 2023
Germany score listed first, score column indicates score after each Werner goal

List of international goals scored by Timo Werner
No.	Date	Venue	Cap	Opponent	Score	Result	Competition	Ref.
1	25 June 2017	Fisht Olympic Stadium, Sochi, Russia	4	Cameroon	2–0	3–1	2017 FIFA Confederations Cup	
2	25 June 2017	Fisht Olympic Stadium, Sochi, Russia	4	Cameroon	3–1	3–1	2017 FIFA Confederations Cup	
3	29 June 2017	Fisht Olympic Stadium, Sochi, Russia	5	Mexico	3–0	4–1	2017 FIFA Confederations Cup	
4	1 September 2017	Eden Arena, Prague, Czech Republic	7	Czech Republic	1–0	2–1	2018 FIFA World Cup qualification	
5	4 September 2017	Mercedes-Benz Arena, Stuttgart, Germany	8	Norway	3–0	6–0	2018 FIFA World Cup qualification	
6	4 September 2017	Mercedes-Benz Arena, Stuttgart, Germany	8	Norway	4–0	6–0	2018 FIFA World Cup qualification	
7	14 November 2017	RheinEnergieStadion, Cologne, Germany	10	France	1–1	2–2	Friendly	
8	8 June 2018	BayArena, Leverkusen, Germany	14	Saudi Arabia	1–0	2–1	Friendly	
9	19 November 2018	Arena AufSchalke, Gelsenkirchen, Germany	23	Netherlands	1–0	2–2	2018–19 UEFA Nations League A	
10	11 June 2019	Opel Arena, Mainz, Germany	25	Estonia	7–0	8–0	UEFA Euro 2020 qualifying	
11	13 October 2019	Lilleküla Stadium, Tallinn, Estonia	28	Estonia	3–0	3–0	UEFA Euro 2020 qualifying	
12	3 September 2020	Mercedes-Benz Arena, Stuttgart, Germany	30	Spain	1–0	1–1	2020–21 UEFA Nations League A	
13	13 October 2020	RheinEnergieStadion, Cologne, Germany	33	Switzerland	1–2	3–3	2020–21 UEFA Nations League A	
14	14 November 2020	Red Bull Arena, Leipzig, Germany	34	Ukraine	2–1	3–1	2020–21 UEFA Nations League A	
15	14 November 2020	Red Bull Arena, Leipzig, Germany	34	Ukraine	3–1	3–1	2020–21 UEFA Nations League A	
16	7 June 2021	Merkur Spiel-Arena, Düsseldorf, Germany	39	Latvia	6–0	7–1	Friendly	
17	2 September 2021	Kybunpark, St. Gallen, Switzerland	43	Liechtenstein	1–0	2–0	2022 FIFA World Cup qualification	
18	5 September 2021	Mercedes-Benz Arena, Stuttgart, Germany	44	Armenia	4–0	6–0	2022 FIFA World Cup qualification	
19	8 September 2021	Laugardalsvöllur, Reykjavík, Iceland	45	Iceland	4–0	4–0	2022 FIFA World Cup qualification	
20	11 October 2021	Toše Proeski Arena, Skopje, North Macedonia	47	North Macedonia	2–0	4–0	2022 FIFA World Cup qualification	
21	11 October 2021	Toše Proeski Arena, Skopje, North Macedonia	47	North Macedonia	3–0	4–0	2022 FIFA World Cup qualification	
22	26 March 2022	Rhein-Neckar-Arena, Sinsheim, Germany	48	Israel	2–0	2–0	Friendly	
23	14 June 2022	Borussia-Park, Mönchengladbach, Germany	53	Italy	4–0	5–2	2022–23 UEFA Nations League A	
24	14 June 2022	Borussia-Park, Mönchengladbach, Germany	53	Italy	5–0	5–2	2022–23 UEFA Nations League A	

== Honours ==
Chelsea

- UEFA Champions League: 2020–21
- UEFA Super Cup: 2021
- FIFA Club World Cup: 2021
- EFL Cup runner-up: 2021–22

RB Leipzig

- DFB-Pokal: 2022–23
- DFL-Supercup: 2023

Tottenham Hotspur

- UEFA Europa League: 2024–25

Germany

- FIFA Confederations Cup: 2017

Individual

- Fritz Walter Medal U17 Gold: 2013
- Fritz Walter Medal U19 Silver: 2015
- UEFA Champions League Breakthrough XI: 2017
- FIFA Confederations Cup Golden Boot: 2017
- UEFA Europa League Squad of the Season: 2017–18
- Bundesliga Team of the Season: 2019–20
- kicker Bundesliga Team of the Season: 2019–20
- Bundesliga Player of the Month: November 2019, December 2019
- MLS Player of the Month: April 2026
