= Niko Tsakiris =

American soccer player (born 2005)

Personal information
- Full name: Nikolas Diego Tsakiris
- Date of birth: June 19, 2005 (age 21)
- Place of birth: Saratoga, California, U.S.
- Height: 5 ft 10 in (1.78 m)
- Position: Midfielder

Team information
- Current team: San Jose Earthquakes
- Number: 10

Youth career
- De Anza Force
- 2015–2017: IMG Academy
- 2017–2022: San Jose Earthquakes

Senior career*
| Years | Team | Apps | (Gls) |
| 2022– | San Jose Earthquakes II | 10 | (2) |
| 2022– | San Jose Earthquakes | 80 | (4) |

International career^{‡}
| 2022–2025 | United States U20 | 28 | (10) |
| 2025– | United States U23 | 2 | (0) |
Medal record
Men's football
Representing United States
CONCACAF U-20 Championship
| Gold medal – first place | 2022 Honduras |
| Silver medal – second place | 2024 Mexico |
- * Club domestic league appearances and goals as of October 21, 2026 ‡ National team caps and goals as of November 18, 2025

Nikolas Diego Tsakiris (born June 19, 2005) is an American professional soccer player who plays as a midfielder for Major League Soccer club San Jose Earthquakes.

== Club career ==
=== Youth career ===
Tsakiris started playing academy soccer with De Anza Force. In 2015, at the age of 10, he moved to Florida to play with IMG Academy. A couple years later in 2017 he returned to the Bay Area and began play with the San Jose Earthquakes academy for four years, until receiving his first professional contract with San Jose at the beginning of 2022.

=== Professional career ===
On January 13, 2022, Tsakiris signed as a Homegrown Player for Major League Soccer side San Jose Earthquakes. He was the tenth homegrown signed by the Quakes in their history and the fifth youngest player they had ever signed.

Tsakiris made his professional debut with San Jose on March 12, 2022, in an MLS match away to Philadelphia Union. Tsakiris became the third youngest player to appear in MLS for San Jose. Tsakiris made his professional start in San Jose's matchup against Bay Cities FC in the third round of the 2022 U.S. Open Cup. Tsakiris also scored his first professional goal in the 83rd minute of the match.

== International career ==
On March 3, 2020, Tsakiris was called up to a training camp for the United States national under-15 team. On April 20, 2022, Tsakiris was called up to a training camp for the United States national under-20 team. He was the second youngest player called for the camp.

== Personal life ==
Niko's father is Shaun Tsakiris, an American former soccer player who is currently an assistant coach of the U.S. under-20 men's soccer team and the director of Los Gatos United academy. He is of Greek and Portuguese descent.

== Career statistics ==
As of match played September 19, 2026

Appearances and goals by club, season and competition
| Club | Season | League | | | U.S. Open Cup | | Continental | | Other | | Total | |
| Club | Season | Division | Apps | Goals | Apps | Goals | Apps | Goals | Apps | Goals | Apps | Goals |
|---|---|---|---|---|---|---|---|---|---|---|---|---|
| San Jose Earthquakes II | 2022 | MLS Next Pro | 6 | 1 | — | | — | | — | | 6 | 1 |
| San Jose Earthquakes II | 2023 | MLS Next Pro | 1 | 0 | — | | — | | — | | 1 | 0 |
| San Jose Earthquakes II | 2025 | MLS Next Pro | 3 | 1 | — | | — | | — | | 3 | 1 |
| San Jose Earthquakes II | Total | | 10 | 2 | — | | — | | — | | 10 | 2 |
| San Jose Earthquakes | 2022 | MLS | 10 | 0 | 2 | 1 | — | | — | | 12 | 1 |
| San Jose Earthquakes | 2023 | MLS | 15 | 0 | — | | — | | 3 (Note: One appearance in MLS Cup playoffs, two appearances in Leagues Cup) | 0 | 18 | 0 |
| San Jose Earthquakes | 2024 | MLS | 25 | 0 | 2 | 0 | — | | 2 (Note: Appearances in Leagues Cup) | 0 | 29 | 0 |
| San Jose Earthquakes | 2025 | MLS | 11 | 1 | 1 | 0 | — | | — | | 12 | 1 |
| San Jose Earthquakes | 2026 | MLS | 19 | 3 | 2 | 1 | — | | — | | 21 | 4 |
| San Jose Earthquakes | Total | | 80 | 4 | 7 | 2 | — | | 5 | 0 | 92 | 6 |
| Career total | | | 90 | 6 | 7 | 2 | 0 | 0 | 5 | 0 | 102 | 8 |

== Honors ==
United States U20

- CONCACAF U-20 Championship: 2022; runner-up: 2024

Individual

- CONCACAF U-20 Championship Golden Ball: 2024
