= Angus Gunn =

English-Scottish footballer (born 1996)

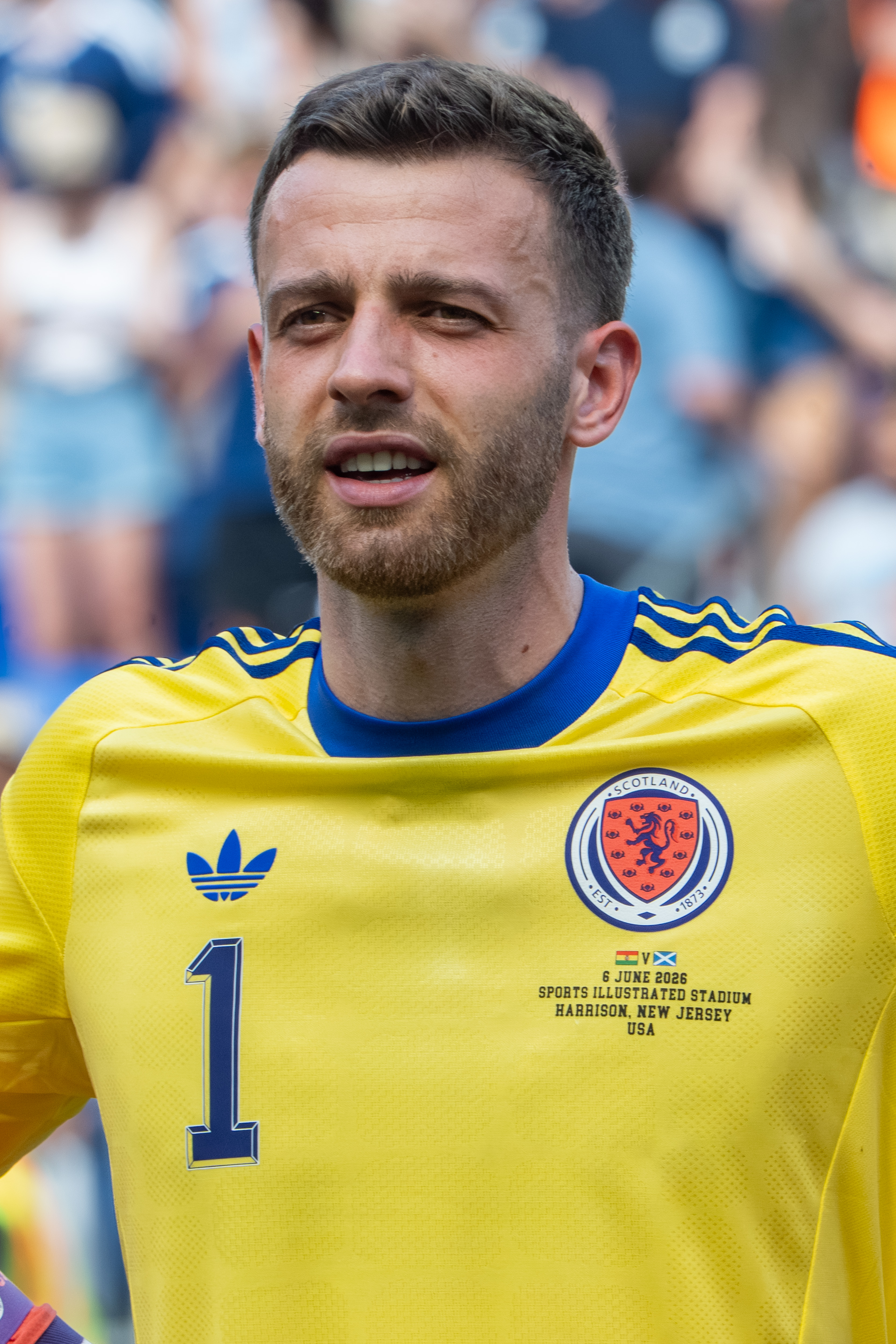
- Gunn with Scotland in 2026

Personal information
- Full name: Angus Fraser James Gunn
- Date of birth: 22 January 1996 (age 30)
- Place of birth: Norwich, Norfolk, England
- Height: 6 ft 5 in (1.96 m)
- Position: Goalkeeper

Team information
- Current team: San Jose Earthquakes
- Number: 1

Youth career
- Norwich City
- 2011–2017: Manchester City

Senior career*
Years	Team	Apps	(Gls)
2017–2018	Manchester City	0	(0)
2017–2018	→ Norwich City (loan)	46	(0)
2018–2021	Southampton	22	(0)
2020–2021	→ Stoke City (loan)	15	(0)
2021–2025	Norwich City	114	(0)
2025–2026	Nottingham Forest	1	(0)
2026–	San Jose Earthquakes	16	(0)

International career^{‡}
2011	England U16	4	(0)
2011–2013	England U17	6	(0)
2014–2015	England U19	4	(0)
2016	England U20	2	(0)
2015–2019	England U21	12	(0)
2023–	Scotland	31	(0)
- * Club domestic league appearances and goals as of 03:56, 8 November 2026 (UTC) ‡ National team caps and goals as of 22:40, 16 November 2026 (UTC)

Angus Fraser James Gunn (born 22 January 1996) is a professional footballer who plays as a goalkeeper for Major League Soccer club San Jose Earthquakes. Born in England, he represents the Scotland national team.

Gunn began his career at his hometown club Norwich City, before joining Manchester City in 2011, signing his first professional contract in 2013. After spending the 2017–18 season on loan at Norwich, Gunn signed for Southampton in the summer of 2018, for a transfer fee of £13.5 million. After a return to the Championship with Stoke City for the 2020–21 season, he returned to Norwich on a permanent basis following their promotion back to the Premier League.

Gunn represented England at under-21 level but declared for Scotland in March 2023. He made his senior debut later that month, and was part of Scotland's squad at UEFA Euro 2024 and the 2026 FIFA World Cup.

== Early life ==
Gunn was born in Norwich, Norfolk, to Norwich City's former goalkeeper and manager Bryan and artist Susan Gunn. His father is originally from Thurso in the far north of Scotland. He has two sisters; another, Francesca, died four years before he was born.

Gunn attended Alpington Primary School and Framingham Earl High School.

== Club career ==
=== Manchester City ===
Gunn began his career at his hometown club Norwich City, before moving to Manchester City in 2011, for which a tribunal decided Manchester City had to pay £250,000. He signed a three-year professional contract in June 2013. He was named on the substitutes bench on a number of occasions throughout the 2016–17 season, but did not play for Manchester City that season.

For the 2017–18 season, Gunn was loaned back to Norwich of the EFL Championship. He made his first-team debut in Norwich's first match of the season, away to Fulham. He got his first professional football clean sheet on 16 August 2017, in a 2–0 home win over Queens Park Rangers at Carrow Road. He would ultimately be the only player to be ever present for Norwich in the league during the season, also being ever present in the FA Cup and making three appearances in the EFL Cup. At the end of the season, Norwich fans voted him third in the Player of the Season vote behind James Maddison and Grant Hanley.

=== Southampton ===
Gunn joined Southampton in July 2018, signing a five-year deal with the club, for a fee estimated at £13.5 million. He made his debut for the club on 28 August 2018 in an EFL Cup tie against Brighton & Hove Albion, and his Premier League debut on 2 January 2019, making several vital saves and keeping a clean sheet and earning the man of the match award in a 0–0 draw against Chelsea.

==== Stoke City (loan) ====
In October 2020 Gunn joined EFL Championship side Stoke City on loan for the 2020–21 season as a replacement for the departing Jack Butland. Gunn made his debut on 27 October 2020 against Swansea City coming on as a half time substitute for the injured Adam Davies. He kept his place for the next three matches before he suffered an ankle injury. Josef Bursik took his place in goal until both Gunn and Davies returned to fitness in January. Gunn made 15 appearances for Stoke until his season was ended by a foot injury in April 2021.

=== Norwich City ===
On 23 June 2021, Gunn made a permanent return to Norwich, for an undisclosed fee. On 28 April 2025, it was announced that Gunn would leave the club at the end of the season, when his contract expired.

=== Nottingham Forest ===
On 6 August 2025, Gunn joined Nottingham Forest on a one-year deal. He made his Forest debut on 1 February 2026 in a Premier League match against Crystal Palace at the City Ground as a half-time replacement for the injured Matz Sels. This turned out to be his only game for the club as he was released on 10 June 2026.

=== San Jose Earthquakes ===
On 8 July 2026, it was announced that Gunn would join Major League Soccer side San Jose Earthquakes on five days later when the MLS transfer window opened. His contract with the club would run until the end of the 2029–30 Major League Soccer season.

== International career ==
=== England ===
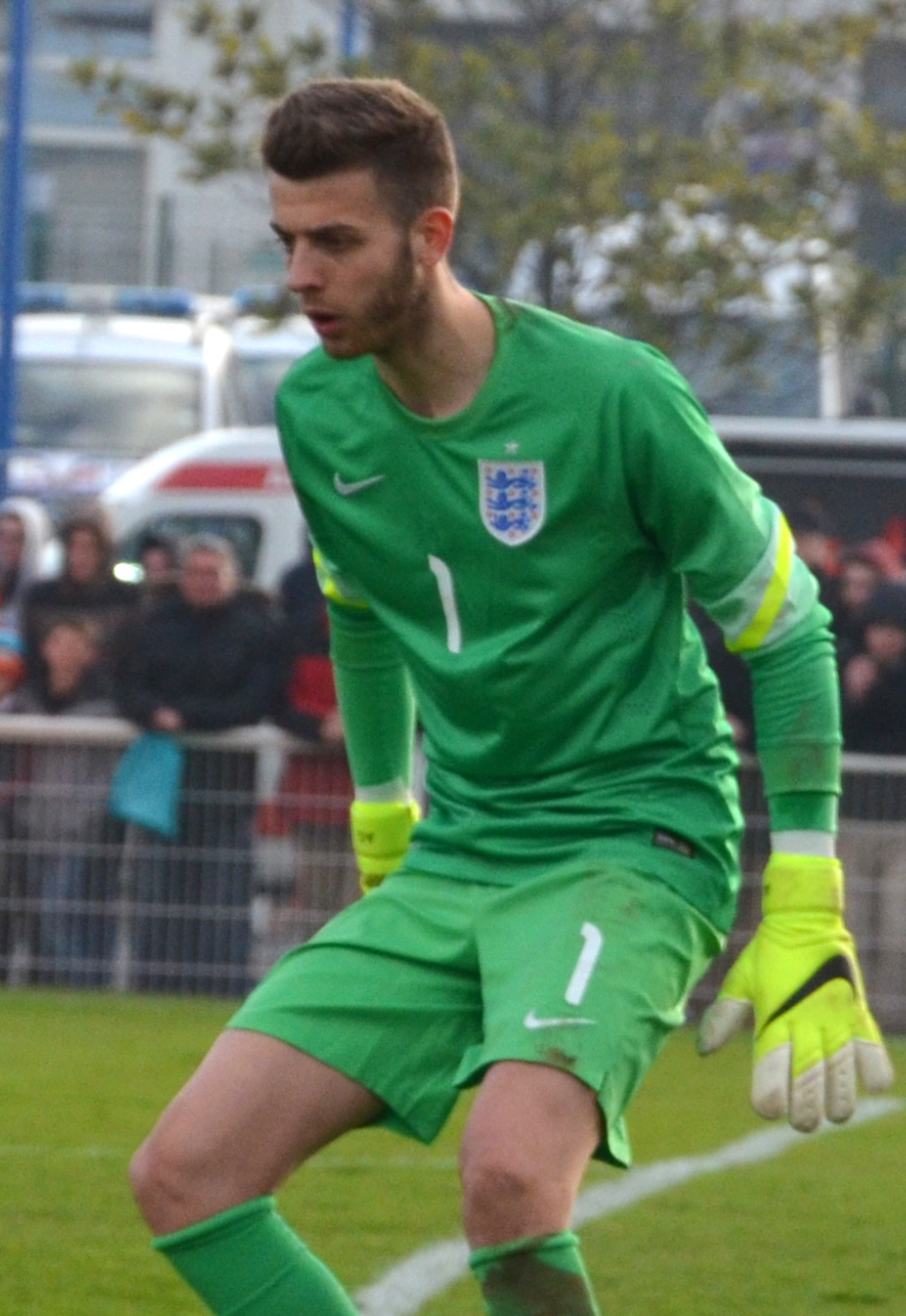
Gunn playing for the England under-19 team in 2015

Despite his father Bryan representing Scotland at international level, Angus represented England at various youth levels. Gunn received his first call up to the England national team in November 2017 for a friendly match against Brazil, after Jack Butland withdrew from the squad with an injury. In March 2018, Gunn was offered the opportunity by Scotland manager Alex McLeish to switch allegiances to Scotland, but decided to stay with the England national team, and was called up by Gareth Southgate to their training camp ahead of the 2018 FIFA World Cup.

=== Scotland ===
Gunn switched his international allegiance to Scotland in March 2023, and was selected in their squad for UEFA Euro 2024 qualifying matches that month.

He made his debut on 25 March against Cyprus at Hampden Park, keeping a clean sheet in a 3–0 victory. Three days later, Gunn recorded his second clean sheet in his second appearance for Scotland as they defeated Spain 2–0 to go top of Group A. Overall, Gunn made six appearances for Scotland during Euro 2024 qualification, keeping four clean sheets as the Scots reached a second consecutive European Championship.

On 7 June 2024, Gunn was named in Scotland's squad for the UEFA Euro 2024 finals in Germany. A week later, he started the opening match of the tournament, where he was beaten five times as Scotland lost 5–1 to hosts Germany in Munich. He went on to start against both Switzerland and Hungary as Scotland finished bottom of Group A with one point from three matches.

On 19 May 2026, Gunn was selected in Steve Clarke's 26-man squad for the 2026 FIFA World Cup. He was selected ahead of Craig Gordon for the tournament, keeping a clean sheet in the opening game against Haiti as the Scots won 1–0. He subsequently conceded four goals in two games against Morocco and Brazil as Scotland failed to make it out of the group stage.

== Career statistics ==
=== Club ===
As of match played 7 November 2026

Appearances and goals by club, season and competition
Club	Season	League			National cup (Note: Includes FA Cup)		League cup (Note: Includes EFL Cup)		Continental		Other		Total	
Club	Season	Division	Apps	Goals	Apps	Goals	Apps	Goals	Apps	Goals	Apps	Goals	Apps	Goals
Manchester City	2017–18	Premier League	—		—		—		—		—		—	
Norwich City (loan)	2017–18	Championship	46	0	2	0	3	0	—		—		51	0
Southampton	2018–19	Premier League	12	0	2	0	3	0	—		—		17	0
Southampton	2019–20	Premier League	10	0	3	0	0	0	—		—		13	0
Southampton	2020–21	Premier League	0	0	—		0	0	—		—		0	0
Southampton	Total		22	0	5	0	3	0	—		—		30	0
Stoke City (loan)	2020–21	Championship	15	0	0	0	0	0	—		—		15	0
Norwich City	2021–22	Premier League	9	0	0	0	2	0	—		—		11	0
Norwich City	2022–23	Championship	30	0	0	0	2	0	—		—		32	0
Norwich City	2023–24	Championship	40	0	0	0	1	0	—		2 (Note: Appearances in Championship play-offs)	0	43	0
Norwich City	2024–25	Championship	35	0	0	0	0	0	—		—		35	0
Norwich City	Total		114	0	0	0	5	0	—		2	0	121	0
Nottingham Forest	2025–26	Premier League	1	0	0	0	0	0	0	0	—		1	0
San Jose Earthquakes	2026	Major League Soccer	16	0	—		—		—		0	0	16	0
Career total			214	0	7	0	11	0	0	0	2	0	234	0

=== International ===
As of match played 16 November 2026

Appearances and goals by national team and year
National team	Year	Apps	Goals
Scotland	2023	7	0
Scotland	2024	8	0
Scotland	2025	5	0
Scotland	2026	11	0
Total		31	0

== Honours ==
England U21

- Toulon Tournament: 2016
