= Reid Roberts =

American soccer player (born 2003)

Personal information
- Date of birth: December 9, 2003 (age 22)
- Place of birth: Fort Collins, Colorado, United States
- Position: Defender

Team information
- Current team: San Jose Earthquakes
- Number: 18

College career
Years	Team	Apps	(Gls)
2022–2024	San Francisco Dons	50	(2)

Senior career*
Years	Team	Apps	(Gls)
2025–	San Jose Earthquakes	14	(0)
2025–	→ The Town FC (loan)	3	(0)
- * Club domestic league appearances and goals

Reid Roberts (born December 9, 2003) is an American professional soccer player who plays as a defender for Major League Soccer club San Jose Earthquakes.

== Career ==
=== San Francisco ===
Roberts played for San Francisco for three seasons from 2022 to 2024.

Roberts was one of 44 college players invited to the 2024 Adidas MLS College Showcase. He was considered among the top prospects heading into the 2025 MLS Draft.

=== San Jose Earthquakes ===
Roberts was selected with the No. 5 overall selection by the San Jose Earthquakes in the 2025 MLS SuperDraft.

On March 22, 2025, Roberts made his MLS debut for the Earthquakes in a 4-1 loss to Charlotte FC. On March 29, 2025, Roberts made his first career MLS start, playing 72 minutes in a 1-1 draw against the Seattle Sounders.
