= Joaquín Pereyra =

Joaquín Pereyra may refer to:

- Joaquín Pereyra (Argentine footballer) (born 1998), Argentine football winger
- Joaquín Pereyra (Uruguayan football defender) (born 1994), Uruguayan football centre-back
- Joaquín Pereyra (Uruguayan football midfielder) (born 1994), Uruguayan football midfielder

== See also ==
- Pereyra
