= Will Richmond =

American professional soccer player (born 2000)

Personal information
- Full name: William Jacob Richmond
- Date of birth: April 6, 2000 (age 26)
- Place of birth: San Francisco, California, United States
- Height: 5 ft 10 in (1.78 m)
- Position: Midfielder

Youth career
- 2014–2015: Ballistic United
- 2015–2016: De Anza Force
- 2016–2018: San Jose Earthquakes

College career
Years	Team	Apps	(Gls)
2018–2021	Stanford Cardinal	72	(11)

Senior career*
Years	Team	Apps	(Gls)
2022–2024	San Jose Earthquakes	3	(0)
2022–2024	The Town FC	44	(7)
- * Club domestic league appearances and goals as of February 6, 2025

William Jacob Richmond (born April 6, 2000) is a former American professional soccer player who plays as a midfielder.

== Career ==
=== College and amateur ===
Richmond played four years of college soccer at Stanford University between 2018 and 2021. As a member of Stanford Cardinal men's soccer he won Pac-12 Conference championships in 2018 and 2020, and made a College Cup appearance in the 2019 NCAA Division I tournament.

=== Professional ===
On January 10, 2022, Richmond signed as a Homegrown Player for Major League Soccer side San Jose Earthquakes. He was the ninth homegrown signed by the Quakes in their history. He retired after the 2024 season.
