= Daniel Munie =

American soccer player (born 2000)

Personal information
- Date of birth: February 10, 2000 (age 26)
- Place of birth: Maryland Heights, Missouri, United States
- Height: 6 ft 0 in (1.83 m)
- Position: Defender

Team information
- Current team: San Jose Earthquakes
- Number: 5

Youth career
- St. Louis Scott Gallagher
- Saint Louis FC

College career
Years	Team	Apps	(Gls)
2018–2022	Indiana Hoosiers	79	(8)

Senior career*
Years	Team	Apps	(Gls)
2021	St. Louis Scott Gallagher	5	(0)
2023–	San Jose Earthquakes	45	(5)
2023	San Jose Earthquakes II	7	(0)
- * Club domestic league appearances and goals as of February 26, 2026

Daniel Munie (born February 10, 2000) is an American professional soccer player who plays as a defender for Major League Soccer club San Jose Earthquakes.

== Career ==
=== Youth, college & amateur ===
Munie attended Parkway North High School, also playing club soccer with St. Louis Scott Gallagher and later the Saint Louis FC academy.

In 2018, Munie attended Indiana University Bloomington to play college soccer after only receiving two Division 1 offers, the other being Saint Louis University. Munie redshirted his freshman season, but went on to appear in 79 games for the Hoosiers, scoring eight goals and tallying five assists. Munie became only the second player ever to earn back-to-back Big Ten Defensive Player of the Year awards, during his time at Indiana. He also earned United Soccer Coaches Third-Team All-America honors on consecutive occasions and led Indiana to the national championship game in 2020 and 2022. Notably, Munie was never booked once during his entire college career.

During his 2021 season at college, Munie also appeared in the USL League Two with St. Louis Scott Gallagher where he made five appearances.

=== Professional ===
Ahead of the 2023 MLS SuperDraft, Munie was considered a top prospect at central defense. On December 22, 2022, Munie was selected 10th overall in the SuperDraft by the San Jose Earthquakes. The Earthquakes acquired the tenth pick from the New England Revolution alongside $250,000 in General Allocation Money in exchange for the fourth-overall pick. He signed with San Jose on February 24, 2023. Munie made his debut for the first team on May 31, 2023, appearing as a 72nd-minute substitute during a 1–0 win at Seattle Sounders FC. Munie also spent time with San Jose Earthquakes II in the MLS Next Pro.

== Honors ==
Individual

- MLS All-Star: 2026
