= Benji Kikanović =

American soccer player (born 2000)

Personal information
- Full name: Benjamin Kikanović
- Date of birth: January 6, 2000 (age 26)
- Place of birth: San Jose, California, U.S.
- Height: 6 ft 1 in (1.85 m)
- Positions: Forward; winger; full-back

Team information
- Current team: San Jose Earthquakes
- Number: 28

Youth career
- Placer United

College career
| Years | Team | Apps | (Gls) |
| 2018–2019 | Sacramento State Hornets | 34 | (9) |

Senior career*
| Years | Team | Apps | (Gls) |
| 2019 | Sacramento Gold | 2 | (0) |
| 2020 | Reno 1868 | 12 | (2) |
| 2021– | San Jose Earthquakes | 105 | (14) |
| 2025– | The Town FC | 0 | (0) |
- * Club domestic league appearances and goals as of 11 February 2026

Benjamin "Benji" Kikanović (born January 6, 2000) is an American professional soccer player who plays as a full-back for Major League Soccer club San Jose Earthquakes.

== Career ==
=== College and amateur ===
Kikanović played two years of college soccer at California State University, Sacramento between 2018 and 2019, making 34 appearances, scoring 9 goals and tallying 5 assists.

In 2019, Kikanović played with NPSL side Sacramento Gold.

=== Professional career ===
On January 13, 2020, Kikanović joined USL Championship side Reno 1868. He had been scouted at a San Jose Earthquakes combine and was offered a contract with Reno, their USL affiliate. Reno folded their team on November 6, 2020, due to the financial impact of the COVID-19 pandemic.

On February 16, 2021, Kikanović joined MLS side San Jose Earthquakes on a one-year deal with club options through the 2024 MLS season.

== Personal life ==
Born in the United States, Kikanović is of Bosnian descent. He grew up in Antelope, California and played in AYSO, Placer United and at Antelope High School.
