= Jack Skahan =

American soccer player (born 1998)

Personal information
- Full name: John Skahan
- Date of birth: February 7, 1998 (age 28)
- Place of birth: Memphis, Tennessee, US
- Height: 5 ft 10 in (1.78 m)
- Position: Midfielder

Team information
- Current team: San Jose Earthquakes
- Number: 16

Youth career
- –2015: Philadelphia Union

College career
Years	Team	Apps	(Gls)
2016–2019	North Carolina Tar Heels	71	(12)

Senior career*
Years	Team	Apps	(Gls)
2016	Memphis City FC		(1)
2017	Wilmington Hammerheads	9	(1)
2018	San Francisco City FC	3	(0)
2019	North Carolina FC U23	1	(0)
2020–	San Jose Earthquakes	63	(3)
2020	→ Reno 1868 (loan)	1	(1)
2022–	San Jose Earthquakes II	4	(2)
- * Club domestic league appearances and goals as of 11 February 2026

John "Jack" Skahan (born February 7, 1998) is an American professional soccer player who plays as a midfielder for Major League Soccer club San Jose Earthquakes.

== Career ==
=== Youth, college, and amateur ===
Skahan played with the Philadelphia Union academy, and later as an amateur player in the National Premier Soccer League with Memphis City FC.

Skahan went on to play four years of college soccer at the University of North Carolina at Chapel Hill between 2016 and 2019, making a total of 71 appearances, scoring 12 goals and tallying 12 assists.

While at college, Skahan appeared for USL League Two sides Wilmington Hammerheads, San Francisco City FC and North Carolina FC U23.

=== Professional ===
Skahan was selected by the San Jose Earthquakes with the 27th pick in the second round of the 2020 MLS SuperDraft. In February 2020, the Earthquakes signed Skahan to a multi-year contract.
