= Ousseni Bouda =

Burkinabé footballer (born 2000)

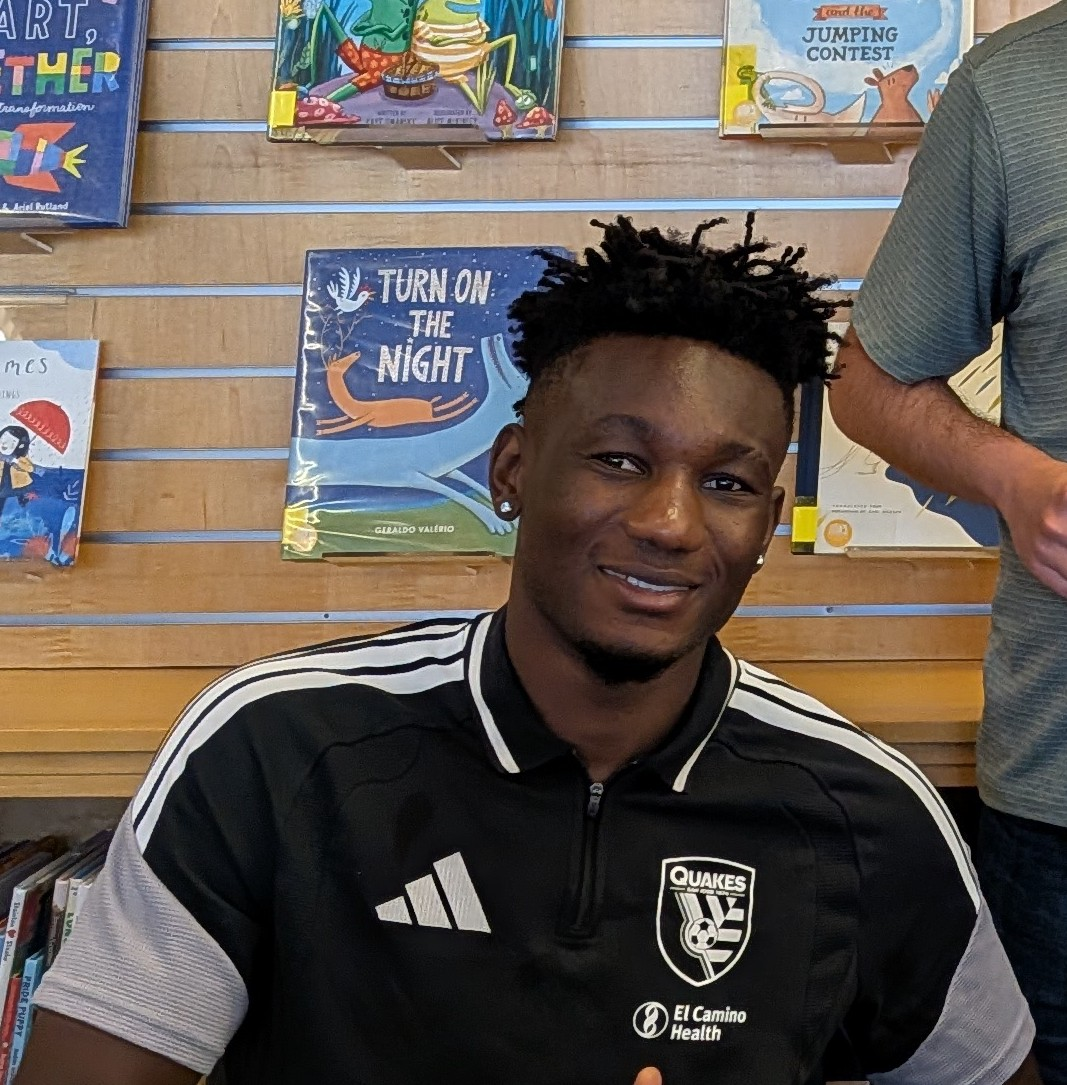
- Bouda at a community event in 2026

Personal information
- Full name: Ousseni Bouda
- Date of birth: 28 April 2000 (age 26)
- Place of birth: Ouagadougou, Burkina Faso
- Height: 5 ft 11 in (1.80 m)
- Positions: Forward; winger

Team information
- Current team: San Jose Earthquakes
- Number: 7

Youth career
- 2012–2015: Right to Dream Academy
- 2015–2018: Millbrook Mustangs
- 2015–2019: Black Rock FC

College career
Years	Team	Apps	(Gls)
2019–2021	Stanford Cardinal	39	(10)

Senior career*
Years	Team	Apps	(Gls)
2018–2019	Black Rock FC	7	(8)
2022–	San Jose Earthquakes	88	(10)
2022–2024	→ The Town FC (loan)	11	(9)
2024	→ Monterey Bay FC (loan)	3	(1)

International career^{‡}
2022–	Burkina Faso	12	(2)
- * Club domestic league appearances and goals as of 8 August 2026 ‡ National team caps and goals as of 6 January 2026

Ousseni Bouda (born 28 April 2000) is a Burkinabé professional footballer who plays for Major League Soccer club San Jose Earthquakes and the Burkina Faso national team.

Bouda was the recipient of the Gatorade National Boys Soccer Player of the Year award for the 2017–18 season. The award is a nationally recognized honor given to the best high school athlete in each sport in the United States.

== Early life ==
Born in Burkina Faso, Ousseni Bouda spent four years at the Right To Dream Academy in Ghana. He then moved to the Millbrook School in New York, and led the Millbrook Mustangs to a class c championship in the New England Preparatory School Athletic Council. He was honored with the Gatorade National Soccer Player of the Year, a national award given to the best boys' high school soccer player. Bouda finished his high school career with 82 appearances for the Mustangs, scoring 156 goals. In his last two high school games, Bouda scored five goals in each game leading the Mustangs to win the championship. Bouda made his amateur club debut with Black Rock FC as a substitute in their 1–1 draw with Seacoast United Phantoms on May 23, 2018. Ahead of his first college season, Bouda once again played with Black Rock in the 2019 USL League Two season, scoring 8 goals in only 6 matches played.

== Stanford Cardinal ==
Listed as a five-star recruit by Top Drawer Soccer, Bouda played college soccer for the Stanford Cardinal men's soccer program. He was the first Stanford soccer player to win the Gatorade High School Player of the Year Award. On August 30, 2019, Bouda made his collegiate debut for Stanford, in a 5–0 win against Penn State. In the same match, Bouda made his first college start and scored his first college goal. On October 15, 2019, Bouda earned the Pac-12 Men's Soccer Player of the Week, being the first freshman of the season to earn the honor. On November 20, 2019, concluding the 2019 Pac-12 Conference men's soccer season, Bouda was named the Pac-12 Freshman of the Year.

Bouda sat out the 2020 season due to injury. In the 2021 season, he led Stanford with nine assists and five goals, and was named to the United Soccer Coaches All-Region first team and to the All-Pac-12 first team.

== Professional career ==

On January 6, 2022, Bouda was announced as one of the eight members of the 2022 Generation Adidas class ahead of the 2022 MLS SuperDraft. Five days later, he was chosen by the San Jose Earthquakes as their first and the eighth overall selection in the MLS SuperDraft. Bouda made his professional debut on March 5th, 2022, as a substitute in San Jose's draw with the Columbus Crew. Bouda made his first professional start and scored his first professional goal on April 19, 2022, in San Jose's 5–0 victory over Bay Cities FC in the Third Round of the 2022 U.S. Open Cup. Bouda also played three matches with San Jose Earthquakes II in MLS Next Pro during the 2022 season, scoring 2 goals.

In the 2023 season Bouda would make the most MLS appearances of his career, appearing 15 times for the Earthquakes during the regular season. Bouda would once again see time with San Jose's second team, appearing in 8 matches and scoring 7 goals during the 2023 MLS Next Pro regular season, helping propel them to the MLS Next Pro playoffs for the first time. Bouda started and scored in Earthquakes II's first ever playoff victory, a 2–0 win away to St. Louis City SC 2 in the Western Conference quarter-finals.

Bouda scored the game-winning goal for the Earthquakes in their 2024 U.S. Open Cup Round of 32 match against Oakland Roots SC on May 7th, 2024.

On June 28, 2024, Bouda moved on loan to USL Championship side Monterey Bay FC for the remainder of their 2024 season, with San Jose retaining the right to recall him at any time before the set completion of the loan deal. Bouda made his debut with Monterey Bay on June 29th, 2024, as a substitute in the 66th minute in a 1–0 loss away to Colorado Springs Switchbacks. The following week Bouda had his first start with Monterey Bay away to Pittsburgh Riverhounds SC. He scored the 91st minute game winner in the 1–0 away result, the goal his first for the club. Bouda was recalled to the Earthquakes on July 20, 2024, ahead of San Jose's match away to Minnesota United FC.

== International career ==
Bouda is a member of the Burkina Faso senior national team. Bouda received his first call up in June 2022, making his senior team debut as a 63rd-minute substitute on June 7th, 2022 in a 2023 Africa Cup of Nations qualification match away to Eswatini. Bouda scored his first international goal on March 22, 2024, the lone goal in a 2–1 friendly loss to Libya.

He also appeared with the Burkina Faso U-20 team in 2019.

== Personal life ==
Bouda obtained his U.S. Green Card in 2023. He is a Muslim from the Mossi and Bissa ethnic groups, and he speaks Mossi, French, and English.

== Career statistics ==
=== Club ===
As of 23 April 2026

Club	Season	League			Cup		Playoffs (Note: Includes MLS & MLS Next Pro Playoffs)		Total	
Club	Season	Division	Apps	Goals	Apps	Goals	Apps	Goals	Apps	Goals
Black Rock FC	2018	Premier Development League	1	0	—		0	0	1	0
Black Rock FC	2019	USL League Two	6	8	0	0	—		6	8
San Jose Earthquakes	2022	Major League Soccer	9	0	3	1	—		12	1
San Jose Earthquakes	2023	Major League Soccer	15	0	1	0	0	0	16	0
San Jose Earthquakes	2024	Major League Soccer	6	0	2	1	—		8	1
San Jose Earthquakes	2025	Major League Soccer	34	3	2	0	—		36	3
San Jose Earthquakes	2026	Major League Soccer	9	5	1	0	—		10	5
San Jose Earthquakes II	2022	MLS Next Pro	3	2	—		—		3	2
San Jose Earthquakes II	2023	MLS Next Pro	8	7	—		2	1	10	8
Monterey Bay FC	2024	USL Championship	2	1	0	0	—		2	1
Career total			93	26	9	2	2	1	104	29

== Honors ==
Individual

- Pac-12 Freshman of the Year: 2019
- Pac- 12 Player of the Week (Oct. 15, 2019; Sept. 3, 2021; Oct. 4, 2021)
- Gatorade High School Player of the Year: 2017–18
- Top Drawer Soccer Best XI Freshman First Team: 2019
- College Soccer News All – Freshman First Team: 2019
- United Soccer Coaches All – Far West Region: 2019, 2021
- All-PAC 12 First Team: 2019, 2021
- High School All American: 2018–2019
- United Soccer Coaches All American: 2018–2019
- New England Soccer Journal Player of the year: 2018–2019
- USA TODAY – ALL AMERICAN boys soccer player of the year: 2018–2019
