= Paul Marie =

French footballer (born 1995)

Personal information
- Full name: Paul Marie
- Date of birth: 24 March 1995 (age 31)
- Place of birth: Saint-Aubin-des-Bois, France
- Height: 1.73 m (5 ft 8 in)
- Position: Right-back

Team information
- Current team: San Jose Earthquakes
- Number: 3

Youth career
- 2001–2002: UA Saint-Sever
- 2002–2005: GRF Severin
- 2005–2007: Grab Sourdin
- 2007–2010: Avranches
- 2010–2013: Caen

College career
Years	Team	Apps	(Gls)
2014	Newberry Wolves	16	(4)
2015–2017	FIU Panthers	52	(14)

Senior career*
Years	Team	Apps	(Gls)
2013–2014	Caen II	6	(1)
2015–2017	Reading United	30	(14)
2018–	San Jose Earthquakes	138	(7)
2018	→ Reno 1868 (loan)	18	(1)
2025	The Town FC	4	(3)
2025	→ Tampa Bay Rowdies (loan)	0	(0)

International career^{‡}
2011	France U16	3	(0)
- * Club domestic league appearances and goals as of 29 August 2025 ‡ National team caps and goals as of 16 March 2018 (UTC)

Paul Marie (born 24 March 1995) is a French professional footballer who plays as a right-back for Major League Soccer club San Jose Earthquakes.

== Career ==
=== College ===
Born in Saint-Aubin-des-Bois, France, Marie moved to the United States as a teenager to attend college. He began at Newberry College in 2014, where he played one season of Division II soccer for the Wolves. He scored four goals and added one assist during sixteen appearances, and received an all-South Atlantic Conference honorable mention.

Marie transferred to Florida International University in 2015, where he studied sports management. He played three seasons of Division I soccer for the Panthers, registering 14 goals and 14 assists in 52 appearances. Eight of these goals and six of these assists came during 17 appearances his senior season in 2017, earning him Third Team All-America, First Team All-Southeast Region and First Team All-Conference USA honors.

=== Professional ===
On 10 January 2018, Marie was selected 12th overall by the San Jose Earthquakes during the 2018 MLS SuperDraft. San Jose general manager Jesse Fioranelli described Marie as "an offensive-minded outside back that has technical qualities and the ability to read the game", which motivated his choice as San Jose's first draft pick. He was officially signed by the club on 16 March 2018, and immediately sent on loan to San Jose's USL affiliate Reno 1868 FC, alongside fellow SuperDraft picks Danny Musovski and Mohamed Thiaw.

On 29 August 2025, Marie joined the Tampa Bay Rowdies in the USL Championship on a loan deal for the remainder of the 2025 season.

== Career statistics ==
As of matches played 2 June 2019

Club	Season	League			National Cup (Note: Includes appearances in U.S. Open Cup)		League Cup		Total	
Club	Season	Division	Apps	Goals	Apps	Goals	Apps	Goals	Apps	Goals
San Jose	2018	MLS	0	0	0	0	0	0	0	0
San Jose	2019	MLS	3	0	0	0	0	0	3	0
San Jose	Total		3	0	0	0	0	0	3	0
Reno (loan)	2018	USL	18	1	0	0	0	0	0	0
Reno (loan)	Total		18	1	0	0	0	0	18	1
Career total			21	1	0	0	0	0	21	1

== Honours ==
Collegiate

- 2014 Honorable Mention All-South Athletic Conference
- 2016 Second Team All-Southeast Region
- 2016 First Team All-Conference USA
- 2017 Third Team All-America
- 2017 First Team All-Southeast Region
- 2017 First Team All-Conference USA
