= RB Leipzig in European football =

German club in European football

- Club: RB Leipzig
- Seasons played: 9
- First entry: 2017–18 UEFA Champions League
- Latest entry: 2026–27 UEFA Champions League

Titles
- Champions League: 0
- Europa League: 0
- Cup Winners' Cup: 0
- Intertoto Cup: 0
- Super Cup: 0

RB Leipzig is a German association football club based in Leipzig, Saxony. The club was founded in 2009 by initiative of the company Red Bull GmbH—which purchased the playing rights of a fifth-tier side, SSV Markranstädt, with the intent of advancing the new club to the top-flight Bundesliga within eight years. Men's professional football is run by the spin-off organization RasenballSport Leipzig GmbH. RB Leipzig plays its home matches at the Red Bull Arena.

Having finished as runners-up in their debut season in the German top flight, RB Leipzig gained entry to continental football for the first time, specifically the 2017–18 Champions League for which Red Bull Salzburg had also qualified as Austrian champions; this raised the issue of a possible conflict of interest between the clubs due to the level of influence exerted by Red Bull over both teams and the close sporting relationship between them in various aspects. After examining the operational structures during June 2017, UEFA declared themselves satisfied under their regulations that the two clubs (particularly Salzburg) were suitably independent from the Red Bull corporation, and sufficiently distinct from one another, for both be admitted to their competitions.

In the first season following that ruling, both reached the quarter-finals of the 2017–18 Europa League but did not play each other, with RB Leipzig eliminated by Olympique de Marseille who then also knocked out Salzburg in the semi-finals. However, in the next edition of the same competition, RB Leipzig and Red Bull Salzburg were drawn together in Group B to meet competitively for the first time.

RB Leipzig is one of the first clubs in history to qualify for the Champions League so soon (eight years) after its creation. Salzburg were the victors in both fixtures between the clubs (3–2 in Germany, 1–0 in Austria) and also won all their other matches to top the group, while Leipzig failed to progress after dropping further points against Celtic and Rosenborg.

== Matches ==
Season	Competition	Round	Opponent	Home	Away	Aggregate
2017–18	UEFA Champions League	Group G	(France) Monaco	1–1	4–1	3rd
2017–18	UEFA Champions League	Group G	(Turkey) Beşiktaş	1–2	0–2	3rd
2017–18	UEFA Champions League	Group G	(Portugal) Porto	3–2	1–3	3rd
2017–18	UEFA Europa League	R32	(Italy) Napoli	0–2	3–1	3–3 (a)
2017–18	UEFA Europa League	R16	(Russia) Zenit Saint Petersburg	2–1	1–1	3–2
2017–18	UEFA Europa League	QF	(France) Marseille	1–0	2–5	3–5
2018–19	UEFA Europa League	2QR	(Sweden) BK Häcken	4–0	1–1	5–1
2018–19	UEFA Europa League	3QR	(Romania) Universitatea Craiova	3–1	1–1	4–2
2018–19	UEFA Europa League	PO	(Ukraine) Zorya Luhansk	3–2	0–0	3–2
2018–19	UEFA Europa League	Group B	(Scotland) Celtic	2–0	1–2	3rd
2018–19	UEFA Europa League	Group B	(Norway) Rosenborg	1–1	3–1	3rd
2018–19	UEFA Europa League	Group B	(Austria) Red Bull Salzburg	2–3	0–1	3rd
2019–20	UEFA Champions League	Group G	(Portugal) Benfica	2–2	2–1	1st
2019–20	UEFA Champions League	Group G	(France) Lyon	0–2	2–2	1st
2019–20	UEFA Champions League	Group G	(Russia) Zenit Saint Petersburg	2–1	2–0	1st
2019–20	UEFA Champions League	R16	(England) Tottenham Hotspur	3–0	1–0	4–0
2019–20	UEFA Champions League	QF	(Spain) Atlético Madrid	2–1		
2019–20	UEFA Champions League	SF	(France) Paris Saint-Germain	0–3		
2020–21	UEFA Champions League	Group H	(Turkey) İstanbul Başakşehir	2–0	4–3	2nd
2020–21	UEFA Champions League	Group H	(France) Paris Saint-Germain	2–1	0–1	2nd
2020–21	UEFA Champions League	Group H	(England) Manchester United	3–2	0–5	2nd
2020–21	UEFA Champions League	R16	(England) Liverpool	0–2	0–2	0–4
2021–22	UEFA Champions League	Group A	(England) Manchester City	2–1	3–6	3rd
2021–22	UEFA Champions League	Group A	(Belgium) Club Brugge	1–2	5–0	3rd
2021–22	UEFA Champions League	Group A	(France) Paris Saint-Germain	2–2	2–3	3rd
2021–22	UEFA Europa League	KRPO	(Spain) Real Sociedad	2–2	3–1	5–3
2021–22	UEFA Europa League	R16	(Russia) Spartak Moscow	Bye (Note: Spartak Moscow, as well as other Russian clubs and national teams, were excluded from all competitions organized by UEFA and FIFA due to the 2022 Russian invasion of Ukraine.)		
2021–22	UEFA Europa League	QF	(Italy) Atalanta	1–1	2–0	3–1
2021–22	UEFA Europa League	SF	(Scotland) Rangers	1–0	1–3	2–3
2022–23	UEFA Champions League	Group F	(Ukraine) Shakhtar Donetsk	1–4	4–0	2nd
2022–23	UEFA Champions League	Group F	(Spain) Real Madrid	3–2	0–2	2nd
2022–23	UEFA Champions League	Group F	(Scotland) Celtic	3–1	2–0	2nd
2022–23	UEFA Champions League	R16	(England) Manchester City	1–1	0–7	1–8
2023–24	UEFA Champions League	Group G	(Switzerland) Young Boys	2–1	3–1	2nd
2023–24	UEFA Champions League	Group G	(England) Manchester City	1–3	2–3	2nd
2023–24	UEFA Champions League	Group G	(Serbia) Red Star Belgrade	3–1	2–1	2nd
2023–24	UEFA Champions League	R16	(Spain) Real Madrid	0–1	1–1	1–2
2024–25	UEFA Champions League	League phase	(Spain) Atlético Madrid	—N/a	1–2	32nd
2024–25	UEFA Champions League	League phase	(Italy) Juventus	2–3	—N/a	32nd
2024–25	UEFA Champions League	League phase	(England) Liverpool	0–1	—N/a	32nd
2024–25	UEFA Champions League	League phase	(Scotland) Celtic	—N/a	1–3	32nd
2024–25	UEFA Champions League	League phase	(Italy) Inter Milan	—N/a	0–1	32nd
2024–25	UEFA Champions League	League phase	(England) Aston Villa	2–3	—N/a	32nd
2024–25	UEFA Champions League	League phase	(Portugal) Sporting CP	2–1	—N/a	32nd
2024–25	UEFA Champions League	League phase	(Austria) Sturm Graz	—N/a	0–1	32nd
2026–27	UEFA Champions League	League phase	(Italy) Como	—N/a	1–4	
2026–27	UEFA Champions League	League phase	(Netherlands) PSV Eindhoven	1–0	—N/a	
2026–27	UEFA Champions League	League phase	(Spain) Real Madrid	—N/a	1–4	
2026–27	UEFA Champions League	League phase	(England) Manchester City		—N/a	
2026–27	UEFA Champions League	League phase	(France) Lens		—N/a	
2026–27	UEFA Champions League	League phase	(England) Manchester United	—N/a		
2026–27	UEFA Champions League	League phase	(Ukraine) Shakhtar Donetsk		—N/a	
2026–27	UEFA Champions League	League phase	(Netherlands) Feyenoord	—N/a		

Source: UEFA.com, Last updated on 21 October 2026

Notes

- 2QR: Second qualifying round
- 3QR: Third qualifying round
- PO : Play-off round
- KRPO : Knockout round play-offs
- R32: Round of 32
- R16: Round of 16
- QF : Quarter-finals
- SF : Semi-finals

== Overall record ==
=== By competition ===
As of 21 October 2026

Competition	Pld	W	D	L	GF	GA	GD	Win%
UEFA Champions League	57	24	6	27	91	105	−14	42.11
UEFA Europa League	24	11	7	6	40	30	+10	45.83
Total	81	35	13	33	131	135	−4	43.21

=== By club ===
As of 21 October 2026

Opponent	Pld	W	D	L	GF	GA	GD	W %
(England) Aston Villa	1	0	0	1	2	3	−1	0.00
(Italy) Atalanta	2	1	1	0	3	1	+2	50.00
(Spain) Atlético Madrid	2	1	0	1	3	3	+0	50.00
(Portugal) Benfica	2	1	1	0	4	3	+1	50.00
(Turkey) Beşiktaş	2	0	0	2	2	4	−2	0.00
(Scotland) Celtic	5	3	0	2	9	6	+3	60.00
(Belgium) Club Brugge	2	1	0	1	6	2	+4	50.00
(Italy) Como	1	0	0	1	1	4	−3	0.00
(Sweden) BK Häcken	2	1	1	0	5	1	+4	50.00
(Italy) Inter Milan	1	0	0	1	0	1	−1	0.00
(Turkey) İstanbul Başakşehir	2	2	0	0	6	3	+3	100.00
(Italy) Juventus	1	0	0	1	2	3	−1	0.00
(England) Liverpool	3	0	0	3	0	5	−5	0.00
(France) Lyon	2	0	1	1	2	4	−2	0.00
(England) Manchester City	6	1	1	4	9	21	−12	16.67
(England) Manchester United	2	1	0	1	3	7	−4	50.00
(France) Marseille	2	1	0	1	3	5	−2	50.00
(France) Monaco	2	1	1	0	5	2	+3	50.00
(Italy) Napoli	2	1	0	1	3	3	+0	50.00
(France) Paris Saint-Germain	5	1	1	3	6	10	−4	20.00
(Portugal) Porto	2	1	0	1	4	5	−1	50.00
(Netherlands) PSV Eindhoven	1	1	0	0	1	0	+1	100.00
(Scotland) Rangers	2	1	0	1	2	3	−1	50.00
(Spain) Real Madrid	5	1	1	3	5	10	−5	20.00
(Spain) Real Sociedad	2	1	1	0	5	3	+2	50.00
(Austria) Red Bull Salzburg	2	0	0	2	2	4	−2	0.00
(Serbia) Red Star Belgrade	2	2	0	0	5	2	+3	100.00
(Norway) Rosenborg	2	1	1	0	4	2	+2	50.00
(Ukraine) Shakhtar Donetsk	2	1	0	1	5	4	+1	50.00
(Portugal) Sporting CP	1	1	0	0	2	1	+1	100.00
(Austria) Sturm Graz	1	0	0	1	0	1	−1	0.00
(England) Tottenham Hotspur	2	2	0	0	4	0	+4	100.00
(Romania) Universitatea Craiova	2	1	1	0	4	2	+2	50.00
(Switzerland) Young Boys	2	2	0	0	5	2	+3	100.00
(Russia) Zenit Saint Petersburg	4	3	1	0	7	3	+4	75.00
(Ukraine) Zorya Luhansk	2	1	1	0	3	2	+1	50.00

=== By country ===
As of 21 October 2026

Opponent	Played	Won	Drawn	Lost	For	Against	Difference	Win percentage
Austria	3	0	0	3	2	5	−3	0.00
Belgium	2	1	0	1	6	2	+4	50.00
England	14	4	1	9	18	36	−18	28.57
France	11	3	3	5	16	21	−5	27.27
Italy	7	2	1	4	9	12	−3	28.57
Netherlands	1	1	0	0	1	0	+1	100.00
Norway	2	1	1	0	4	2	+2	50.00
Portugal	5	3	1	1	10	9	+1	60.00
Romania	2	1	1	0	4	2	+2	50.00
Russia	4	3	1	0	7	3	+4	75.00
Scotland	7	4	0	3	11	9	+2	57.14
Serbia	2	2	0	0	5	2	+3	100.00
Spain	9	3	2	4	13	16	−3	33.33
Sweden	2	1	1	0	5	1	+4	50.00
Switzerland	2	2	0	0	5	2	+3	100.00
Turkey	4	2	0	2	8	7	+1	50.00
Ukraine	4	2	1	1	8	6	+2	50.00
