= 2017–18 RB Leipzig season =

RB Leipzig
2017–18 season
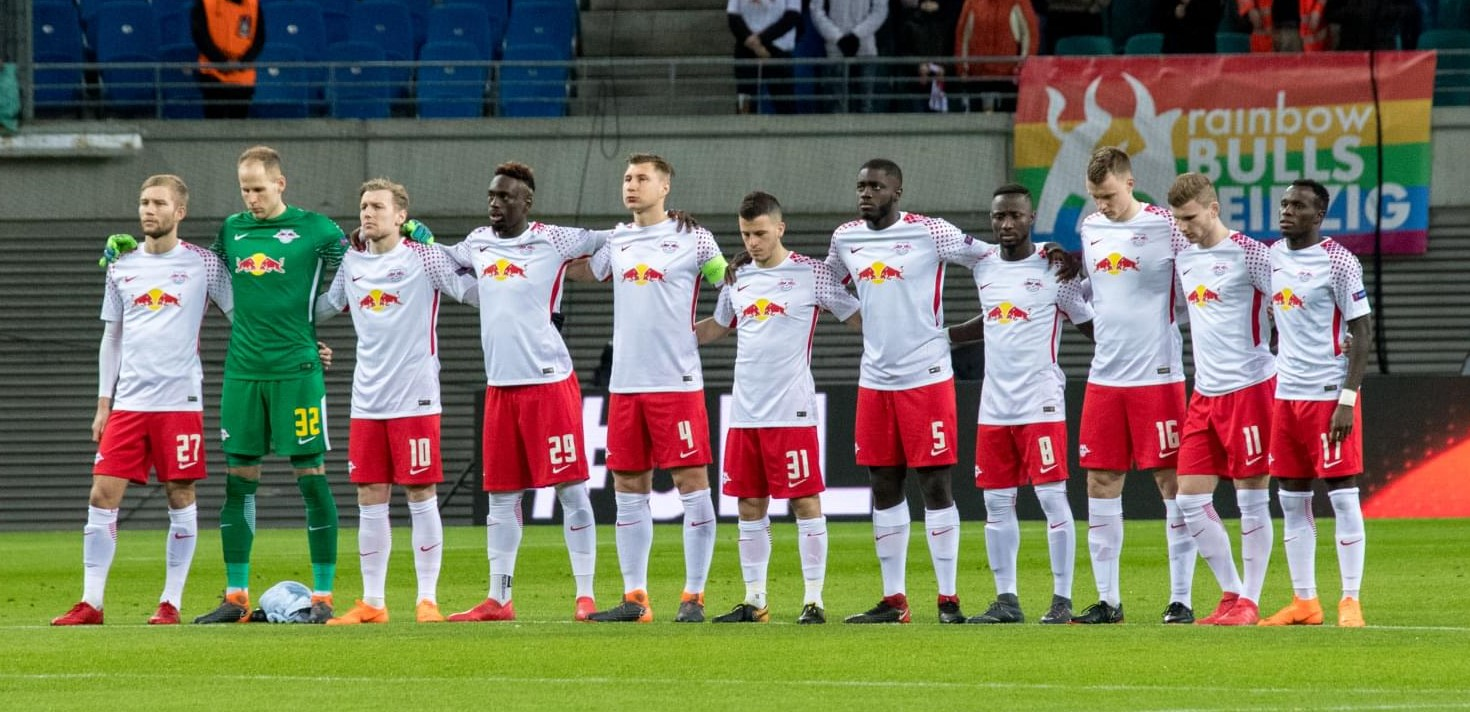
- Chairman: Oliver Mintzlaff
- Sporting director: Ralf Rangnick
- Manager: Ralph Hasenhüttl
- Stadium: Red Bull Arena
- Bundesliga: 6th
- DFB-Pokal: Second round
- UEFA Champions League: Group stage
- UEFA Europa League: Quarter-finals
- Top goalscorer: League: Timo Werner (13); All: Timo Werner (21)
- Highest home attendance: 42,558
- Lowest home attendance: 19,877
- Average home league attendance: 39,397
- Biggest win: Dorfmerkingen 0–5 Leipzig, DFB-Pokal, 13 August 2017
- Biggest defeat: Hoffenheim 4–0 Leipzig, Bundesliga, 2 December 2017
Home colours	Away colours	Third colours

The 2017–18 RB Leipzig season was the 9th season in the football club's history and 2nd consecutive and overall season in the top flight of German football, the Bundesliga, having been promoted from the 2. Bundesliga in 2016. In addition to the domestic league, RB Leipzig also participated in the season's editions of the domestic cup, the DFB-Pokal, and the first-tier continental cup, the UEFA Champions League. This was the 8th season for Leipzig in the Red Bull Arena, located in Leipzig, Saxony, Germany. The season covers a period from 1 July 2017 to 30 June 2018.

== Players ==
=== Squad information ===
As of 2 February 2018

Note: Flags indicate national team as defined under FIFA eligibility rules; some limited exceptions apply. Players may hold more than one non-FIFA nationality.

No.	Pos.	Nation	Player
1	GK	SUI	Fabio Coltorti
3	DF	BRA	Bernardo
4	DF	HUN	Willi Orbán (vice-captain)
5	DF	FRA	Dayot Upamecano
6	DF	FRA	Ibrahima Konaté
7	MF	AUT	Marcel Sabitzer
8	MF	GUI	Naby Keïta
9	FW	DEN	Yussuf Poulsen
10	FW	SWE	Emil Forsberg
11	FW	GER	Timo Werner
13	MF	AUT	Stefan Ilsanker
16	DF	GER	Lukas Klostermann

No.	Pos.	Nation	Player
17	FW	POR	Bruma
18	FW	ENG	Ademola Lookman (on loan from Everton)
20	DF	GER	Benno Schmitz
22	GK	SUI	Philipp Köhn
23	DF	GER	Marcel Halstenberg
24	MF	GER	Dominik Kaiser (captain)
27	MF	AUT	Konrad Laimer
28	GK	SUI	Yvon Mvogo
29	FW	FRA	Jean-Kévin Augustin
31	MF	GER	Diego Demme
32	GK	HUN	Péter Gulácsi
44	MF	SVN	Kevin Kampl

=== Transfers ===
==== In ====
No.	Pos	Player	From	Type	Window	Ends	Fee	Source
6	DF	(France) Ibrahima Konaté	(France) Sochaux	Transfer	Summer	2022	Free	
17	FW	(Portugal) Bruma	(Turkey) Galatasaray	Transfer	Summer	2022	€12,500,000	
18	FW	(England) Ademola Lookman	(England) Everton	Loan	Winter	2018	Free	
22	GK	(Switzerland) Philipp Köhn	VfB Stuttgart U19	Transfer	Summer	2021	Free	
27	MF	(Austria) Konrad Laimer	(Austria) Red Bull Salzburg	Transfer	Summer	2021	€7,000,000	
28	GK	(Switzerland) Yvon Mvogo	(Switzerland) Young Boys	Transfer	Summer	2021	€5,000,000	
29	FW	(France) Jean-Kévin Augustin	(France) Paris Saint-Germain	Transfer	Summer	2022	€13,000,000	
38	FW	(Germany) Federico Palacios	RB Leipzig II	Transfer	Summer	2018	Free	
40	FW	(Germany) Elias Abouchabaka	RB Leipzig U17	Transfer	Summer	2018	Free	
44	MF	(Slovenia) Kevin Kampl	Bayer Leverkusen	Transfer	Summer	2021	€20,000,000	
—	MF	(Germany) Felix Beiersdorf	RB Leipzig II	Transfer	Summer	2021	Free	
—	MF	(Germany) Felix Beiersdorf	(Austria) Wiener Neustadt	Loan Return	Winter	2021	Free	
—	FW	(Germany) Agyemang Diawusie	RB Leipzig U19	Transfer	Summer	2020	Free	
—	DF	(Germany) Anthony Jung	FC Ingolstadt	Loan Return	Summer	2019	Free	
—	MF	(Hungary) Zsolt Kalmár	(Denmark) Brøndby IF	Loan Return	Summer	2019	Free	
—	FW	(Germany) Nicolas Kühn	RB Leipzig U17	Transfer	Summer	2018	Free	
—	DF	(Turkey) Atinc Nukan	(Turkey) Beşiktaş	Loan Return	Summer	2020	Free	
—	FW	(Germany) Nils Quaschner	VfL Bochum	Loan Return	Summer	2020	Free	

==== Out ====
No.	Pos	Player	To	Type	Window	Fee	Source
6	MF	(Germany) Rani Khedira	FC Augsburg	Transfer	Summer	Free	
19	FW	(Scotland) Oliver Burke	(England) West Bromwich Albion	Transfer	Summer	€15,200,000	
21	GK	(Germany) Marius Müller	1. FC Kaiserslautern	Loan	Summer	Free	
27	FW	(Germany) Davie Selke	Hertha BSC	Transfer	Summer	€8,000,000	
33	DF	(Germany) Marvin Compper	(Scotland) Celtic	Transfer	Winter	€1,140,000	
38	FW	(Germany) Federico Palacios Martinez	1. FC Nürnberg	Transfer	Winter	Undisclosed	
—	MF	(Germany) Felix Beiersdorf	(Austria) Wiener Neustadt	Loan	Summer	Free	
—	MF	(Germany) Felix Beiersdorf	Chemie Leipzig	Loan	Winter	Free	
—	FW	(Germany) Agyemang Diawusie	Wehen Wiesbaden	Loan	Summer	Free	
—	DF	(Germany) Anthony Jung	(Denmark) Brøndby IF	Loan	Summer	Free	
—	MF	(Hungary) Zsolt Kalmár	(Slovakia) Dunajská Streda	Loan	Summer	Free	
—	FW	(Turkey) Atinc Nukan	(Turkey) Beşiktaş	Loan	Summer	€200,000	
—	FW	(Germany) Nils Quaschner	Arminia Bielefeld	Transfer	Summer	Undisclosed	

== Kits ==
Home	Home alt.	Home alt. 2	Away	Away alt.	Third

== Competitions ==
Win Draw Loss

=== Overview ===
Competition	First match	Last match	Starting round	Final position	Record							
Competition	First match	Last match	Starting round	Final position	Pld	W	D	L	GF	GA	GD	Win %
Bundesliga	19 August 2017	12 May 2018	Matchday 1	6th	34	15	8	11	57	53	+4	44.12
DFB-Pokal	13 August 2017	25 October 2017	First round	Second round	2	1	1	0	6	1	+5	50.00
Champions League	13 September 2017	6 December 2017	Group stage	Group stage	6	2	1	3	10	11	−1	33.33
Europa League	15 February 2018	12 April 2018	Round of 32	Quarter-finals	6	3	1	2	9	10	−1	50.00
Total					48	21	11	16	82	75	+7	43.75

Last updated: 21 May 2018
Source: Competitions

=== Bundesliga ===
==== League table ====
Pos	Team	Pld	W	D	L	GF	GA	GD	Pts	Qualification or relegation
4	Borussia Dortmund	34	15	10	9	64	47	+17	55	Qualification for the Champions League group stage
5	Bayer Leverkusen	34	15	10	9	58	44	+14	55	Qualification for the Europa League group stage
6	RB Leipzig	34	15	8	11	57	53	+4	53	Qualification for the Europa League second qualifying round
7	VfB Stuttgart	34	15	6	13	36	36	0	51	
8	Eintracht Frankfurt	34	14	7	13	45	45	0	49	Qualification for the Europa League group stage (Note: Eintracht Frankfurt qualified for the Europa League group stage by winning the 2017–18 DFB-Pokal.)

Source: DFB
Rules for classification: 1) Points; 2) Goal difference; 3) Goals scored; 4) Head-to-head results; 5) Head-to-head away goals scored; 6) Away goals scored; 7) Play-off.

==== Results summary ====
Overall								Home						Away					
Pld	W	D	L	GF	GA	GD	Pts	W	D	L	GF	GA	GD	W	D	L	GF	GA	GD
34	15	8	11	57	53	+4	53	9	4	4	34	26	+8	6	4	7	23	27	−4

Last updated: 21 May 2018.
Source: Bundesliga

==== Results by round ====
Round	1	2	3	4	5	6	7	8	9	10	11	12	13	14	15	16	17	18	19	20	21	22	23	24	25	26	27	28	29	30	31	32	33	34
Ground	A	H	A	H	A	H	A	A	H	A	H	A	H	A	H	A	H	H	A	H	A	H	A	H	H	A	H	A	H	A	H	A	H	A
Result	L	W	W	D	L	W	W	W	W	L	W	D	W	L	D	D	L	W	L	D	W	W	L	L	D	D	W	W	L	D	L	L	W	W
Position	16	7	4	6	9	6	4	3	3	3	2	3	2	2	2	3	5	2	4	5	3	2	5	6	6	6	6	4	6	5	6	6	6	6

Updated to match(es) played on 21 May 2018. Source: Bundesliga
A = Away; H = Home; W = Win; D = Draw; L = Loss

==== Matches ====
19 August 2017 1	Schalke 04	2–0	RB Leipzig	Gelsenkirchen
18:30 CEST (UTC+2)	Bentaleb 43' (pen.); Konoplyanka 73'	Report		Stadium: Veltins-Arena; Attendance: 61,435; Referee: Felix Zwayer

27 August 2017 2	RB Leipzig	4–1	SC Freiburg	Leipzig
15:30 CEST (UTC+2)	Werner 48', 71'; Orbán 55'; Bruma 80'	Report	Niederlechner 23'	Stadium: Red Bull Arena; Attendance: 39,265; Referee: Christian Dingert

8 September 2017 3	Hamburger SV	0–2	RB Leipzig	Hamburg
20:30 CEST (UTC+2)		Report	Keïta 67'; Werner 75'	Stadium: Volksparkstadion; Attendance: 50,231; Referee: Deniz Aytekin

16 September 2017 4	RB Leipzig	2–2	Borussia Mönchengladbach	Leipzig
18:30 CEST (UTC+2)	Werner 17'; Augustin 31'	Report	Hazard 25' (pen.); Stindl 61'	Stadium: Red Bull Arena; Attendance: 42,558; Referee: Marco Fritz

19 September 2017 5	FC Augsburg	1–0	RB Leipzig	Augsburg
20:30 CEST (UTC+2)	Gregoritsch 4'	Report		Stadium: WWK Arena; Attendance: 26,113; Referee: Daniel Siebert

23 September 2017 6	RB Leipzig	2–1	Eintracht Frankfurt	Leipzig
15:30 CEST (UTC+2)	Augustin 28'; Werner 67'	Report	Rebić 77'	Stadium: Red Bull Arena; Attendance: 40,606; Referee: Benjamin Brand

1 October 2017 7	1. FC Köln	1–2	RB Leipzig	Cologne
18:00 CEST (UTC+2)	Osako 82'	Report	Klostermann 30'; Poulsen 80'	Stadium: RheinEnergieStadion; Attendance: 48,700; Referee: Felix Zwayer

14 October 2017 8	Borussia Dortmund	2–3	RB Leipzig	Dortmund
18:30 CEST (UTC+2)	Aubameyang 4', 64' (pen.)	Report	Sabitzer 10'; Poulsen 25'; Augustin 49' (pen.)	Stadium: Signal Iduna Park; Attendance: 80,100; Referee: Deniz Aytekin

21 October 2017 9	RB Leipzig	1–0	VfB Stuttgart	Leipzig
15:30 CEST (UTC+2)	Sabitzer 23'	Report		Stadium: Red Bull Arena; Attendance: 42,558; Referee: Sven Jablonski

28 October 2017 10	Bayern Munich	2–0	RB Leipzig	Munich
18:30 CEST (UTC+2)	Rodríguez 19'; Lewandowski 38'	Report		Stadium: Allianz Arena; Attendance: 75,000; Referee: Daniel Siebert

4 November 2017 11	RB Leipzig	2–1	Hannover 96	Leipzig
15:30 CET (UTC+1)	Poulsen 70'; Werner 85'	Report	Jonathas 56'	Stadium: Red Bull Arena; Attendance: 40,461; Referee: Martin Petersen

18 November 2017 12	Bayer Leverkusen	2–2	RB Leipzig	Leverkusen
15:30 CET (UTC+1)	Bailey 44'; Volland 74'	Report	Werner 13' (pen.); Forsberg 54' (pen.)	Stadium: BayArena; Attendance: 29,218; Referee: Harm Osmers

25 November 2017 13	RB Leipzig	2–0	Werder Bremen	Leipzig
15:30 CET (UTC+1)	Keïta 34'; Bernardo 87'	Report		Stadium: Red Bull Arena; Attendance: 40,172; Referee: Sascha Stegemann

2 December 2017 14	1899 Hoffenheim	4–0	RB Leipzig	Sinsheim
15:30 CET (UTC+1)	Amiri 13'; Gnabry 52', 62'; Uth 87'	Report		Stadium: Wirsol Rhein-Neckar-Arena; Attendance: 28,299; Referee: Daniel Siebert

9 December 2017 15	RB Leipzig	2–2	Mainz 05	Leipzig
15:30 CET (UTC+1)	Kampl 29'; Werner 45+3' (pen.)	Report	Quaison 39'; Berggreen 86'	Stadium: Red Bull Arena; Attendance: 32,817; Referee: Patrick Ittrich

12 December 2017 16	VfL Wolfsburg	1–1	RB Leipzig	Wolfsburg
18:30 CET (UTC+1)	Verhaegh 15' (pen.)	Report	Halstenberg 52'	Stadium: Volkswagen Arena; Attendance: 22,827; Referee: Guido Winkmann

17 December 2017 17	RB Leipzig	2–3	Hertha BSC	Leipzig
18:00 CET (UTC+1)	Orbán 68'; Halstenberg 90+2'	Report	Selke 5', 51'; Kalou 31'	Stadium: Red Bull Arena; Attendance: 36,109; Referee: Frank Willenborg

13 January 2018 18	RB Leipzig	3–1	Schalke 04	Leipzig
18:30 CET (UTC+1)	Keïta 41'; Werner 69'; Bruma 71'	Report	Naldo 55'	Stadium: Red Bull Arena; Attendance: 42,558; Referee: Deniz Aytekin

20 January 2018 19	SC Freiburg	2–1	RB Leipzig	Freiburg
15:30 CET (UTC+1)	Haberer 72'; Koch 76'	Report	Werner 65'	Stadium: Schwarzwald-Stadion; Attendance: 23,700; Referee: Benjamin Brand

27 January 2018 20	RB Leipzig	1–1	Hamburger SV	Leipzig
15:30 CET (UTC+1)	Bruma 9'	Report	Kostić 29'	Stadium: Red Bull Arena; Attendance: 42,558; Referee: Benjamin Cortus

3 February 2018 21	Borussia Mönchengladbach	0–1	RB Leipzig	Mönchengladbach
18:30 CET (UTC+1)		Report	Lookman 89'	Stadium: Borussia-Park; Attendance: 49,018; Referee: Tobias Stieler

9 February 2018 22	RB Leipzig	2–0	FC Augsburg	Leipzig
20:30 CET (UTC+1)	Upamecano 17'; Keïta 70'	Report		Stadium: Red Bull Arena; Attendance: 34,286; Referee: Sven Jablonski

19 February 2018 23	Eintracht Frankfurt	2–1	RB Leipzig	Frankfurt
20:35 CET (UTC+1)	Chandler 22'; Boateng 26'	Report	Augustin 13'	Stadium: Commerzbank-Arena; Attendance: 45,100; Referee: Felix Zwayer
Note: The match, originally scheduled for 20:30 CET, was delayed to 20:35 CET due to a fan protest.

25 February 2018 24	RB Leipzig	1–2	1. FC Köln	Leipzig
18:00 CET (UTC+1)	Augustin 5'	Report	Koziello 70'; Bittencourt 77'	Stadium: Red Bull Arena; Attendance: 31,793; Referee: Harm Osmers

3 March 2018 25	RB Leipzig	1–1	Borussia Dortmund	Leipzig
18:30 CET (UTC+1)	Augustin 29'	Report	Reus 38'	Stadium: Red Bull Arena; Attendance: 42,558; Referee: Felix Brych

11 March 2018 26	VfB Stuttgart	0–0	RB Leipzig	Stuttgart
15:30 CET (UTC+1)		Report		Stadium: Mercedes-Benz Arena; Attendance: 53,548; Referee: Tobias Stieler

18 March 2018 27	RB Leipzig	2–1	Bayern Munich	Leipzig
18:00 CET (UTC+1)	Keïta 37'; Werner 56'	Report	Wagner 12'	Stadium: Red Bull Arena; Attendance: 42,558; Referee: Marco Fritz

31 March 2018 28	Hannover 96	2–3	RB Leipzig	Hanover
15:30 CEST (UTC+2)	Sané 71'; Füllkrug 78'	Report	Forsberg 16'; Orbán 53'; Poulsen 76'	Stadium: HDI-Arena; Attendance: 42,300; Referee: Guido Winkmann

9 April 2018 29	RB Leipzig	1–4	Bayer Leverkusen	Leipzig
20:30 CEST (UTC+2)	Sabitzer 17'	Report	Havertz 45'; Brandt 51'; Retsos 56'; Volland 69'	Stadium: Red Bull Arena; Attendance: 35,617; Referee: Deniz Aytekin

15 April 2018 30	Werder Bremen	1–1	RB Leipzig	Bremen
18:00 CEST (UTC+2)	Moisander 28'	Report	Lookman 50'	Stadium: Weser-Stadion; Attendance: 42,100; Referee: Christian Dingert

21 April 2018 31	RB Leipzig	2–5	1899 Hoffenheim	Leipzig
15:30 CEST (UTC+2)	Keïta 59'; Upamecano 88'	Report	Uth 14', 59'; Gnabry 35'; Kadeřábek 45'; Rupp 64'	Stadium: Red Bull Arena; Attendance: 41,780; Referee: Tobias Welz

29 April 2018 32	Mainz 05	3–0	RB Leipzig	Mainz
15:30 CEST (UTC+2)	De Blasis 29' (pen.); Maxim 85'; Baku 90'	Report		Stadium: Opel Arena; Attendance: 30,083; Referee: Bastian Dankert

5 May 2018 33	RB Leipzig	4–1	VfL Wolfsburg	Leipzig
15:30 CEST (UTC+2)	Lookman 24', 52'; Werner 33'; Augustin 63'	Report	Didavi 47'	Stadium: Red Bull Arena; Attendance: 41,487; Referee: Marco Fritz

12 May 2018 34	Hertha BSC	2–6	RB Leipzig	Berlin
15:30 CEST (UTC+2)	Ibišević 4'; Kalou 64'	Report	Upamecano 2'; Lookman 8'; Augustin 22', 54'; Werner 49'; Bruma 82'	Stadium: Olympiastadion Berlin; Attendance: 60,502; Referee: Sven Jablonski

=== DFB-Pokal ===
13 August 2017 First round	Sportfreunde Dorfmerkingen	0–5	RB Leipzig	Aalen
15:30 CEST (UTC+2)		Report	Sabitzer 4', 47'; Werner 56'; Poulsen 59' (pen.); Keïta 65'	Stadium: Ostalb Arena; Attendance: 10,460; Referee: Florian Badstübner

25 October 2017 Second round	RB Leipzig	1–1 (a.e.t.) (4–5 p)	Bayern Munich	Leipzig
20:45 CEST (UTC+2)	Forsberg 68' (pen.)	Report	Thiago 73'	Stadium: Red Bull Arena; Attendance: 42,558; Referee: Felix Zwayer
	Penalties
	Bernardo (penalty scored); Kampl (penalty scored); Halstenberg (penalty scored); Orbán (penalty scored); Werner (penalty missed)		(penalty scored) Lewandowski; (penalty scored) Alaba; (penalty scored) Hummels; (penalty scored) Rudy; (penalty scored) Robben

=== UEFA Champions League ===
==== Group stage ====
Pos	Team	Pld	W	D	L	GF	GA	GD	Pts	Qualification	BES	POR	RBL	MON
1	(Turkey) Beşiktaş	6	4	2	0	11	5	+6	14	Advance to knockout phase	—	1–1	2–0	1–1
2	(Portugal) Porto	6	3	1	2	15	10	+5	10	Advance to knockout phase	1–3	—	3–1	5–2
3	(Germany) RB Leipzig	6	2	1	3	10	11	−1	7	Transfer to Europa League	1–2	3–2	—	1–1
4	(France) Monaco	6	0	2	4	6	16	−10	2		1–2	0–3	1–4	—

Source: UEFA
Rules for classification: Group stage tiebreakers

13 September 2017 1	RB Leipzig (Germany)	1–1	(France) Monaco	Leipzig, Germany
20:45 CEST (UTC+2)	Forsberg 33'	Report	Tielemans 34'	Stadium: Red Bull Arena; Attendance: 40,068; Referee: Michael Oliver (England)

26 September 2017 2	Beşiktaş (Turkey)	2–0	(Germany) RB Leipzig	Istanbul, Turkey
21:45 TRT (UTC+3); 20:45 CEST (UTC+2)	Babel 11'; Talisca 43'	Report		Stadium: Vodafone Park; Attendance: 36,641; Referee: Sergei Karasev (Russia)

17 October 2017 3	RB Leipzig (Germany)	3–2	(Portugal) Porto	Leipzig, Germany
20:45 CEST (UTC+2)	Orbán 8'; Forsberg 38'; Augustin 41'	Report	Aboubakar 18'; Marcano 44'	Stadium: Red Bull Arena; Attendance: 41,496; Referee: Paolo Tagliavento (Italy)

1 November 2017 4	Porto (Portugal)	3–1	(Germany) RB Leipzig	Porto, Portugal
19:45 WET (UTC); 20:45 CET (UTC+1)	Herrera 13'; Danilo 61'; Pereira 90+3'	Report	Werner 48'	Stadium: Estádio do Dragão; Attendance: 41,616; Referee: Ovidiu Hațegan (Romania)

21 November 2017 5	Monaco (France)	1–4	(Germany) RB Leipzig	Fontvieille, Monaco
20:45 CET (UTC+1)	Falcao 43'	Report	Jemerson 6' (o.g.); Werner 9', 31' (pen.); Keïta 45'	Stadium: Stade Louis II; Attendance: 9,029; Referee: Alberto Undiano Mallenco (Spain)

6 December 2017 6	RB Leipzig (Germany)	1–2	(Turkey) Beşiktaş	Leipzig, Germany
20:45 CET (UTC+1)	Keïta 87'	Report	Negredo 10' (pen.); Talisca 90'	Stadium: Red Bull Arena; Attendance: 42,558; Referee: Viktor Kassai (Hungary)

=== UEFA Europa League ===
==== Knockout phase ====
===== Round of 32 =====
15 February 2018 First leg	Napoli (Italy)	1–3	(Germany) RB Leipzig	Naples, Italy
21:05 CET (UTC+1)	Ounas 52'	Report	Werner 61', 90+3'; Bruma 74'	Stadium: Stadio San Paolo; Attendance: 14,554; Referee: Artur Soares Dias (Portugal)

22 February 2018 Second leg	RB Leipzig (Germany)	0–2 (3a–3 agg.)	(Italy) Napoli	Leipzig, Germany
19:00 CET (UTC+1)		Report	Zieliński 33'; Insigne 86'	Stadium: Red Bull Arena; Attendance: 36,163; Referee: Anthony Taylor (England)

===== Round of 16 =====
8 March 2018 First leg	RB Leipzig (Germany)	2–1	(Russia) Zenit Saint Petersburg	Leipzig, Germany
21:05 CET (UTC+1)	Bruma 56'; Werner 77'	Report	Criscito 86'	Stadium: Red Bull Arena; Attendance: 19,877; Referee: Ovidiu Hațegan (Romania)

15 March 2018 Second leg	Zenit Saint Petersburg (Russia)	1–1 (2–3 agg.)	(Germany) RB Leipzig	Saint Petersburg, Russia
19:00 CET (UTC+1)	Driussi 45+1'	Report	Augustin 22'	Stadium: Krestovsky Stadium; Attendance: 43,000; Referee: Daniele Orsato (Italy)

===== Quarter-finals =====
5 April 2018 First leg	RB Leipzig (Germany)	1–0	(France) Marseille	Leipzig, Germany
21:05 CEST (UTC+2)	Werner 45+1'	Report		Stadium: Red Bull Arena; Attendance: 34,043; Referee: Alberto Undiano Mallenco (Spain)

12 April 2018 Second leg	Marseille (France)	5–2 (5–3 agg.)	(Germany) RB Leipzig	Marseille, France
21:05 CEST (UTC+2)	Ilsanker 6' (o.g.); Sarr 9'; Thauvin 38'; Payet 60'; Sakai 90+4'	Report	Bruma 2'; Augustin 55'	Stadium: Stade Vélodrome; Attendance: 60,000; Referee: Björn Kuipers (Netherlands)

== Statistics ==
=== Appearances and goals ===
No.	Pos	Nat	Player	Total		Bundesliga		DFB-Pokal		UEFA Champions League		UEFA Europa League	
No.	Pos	Nat	Player	Apps	Goals	Apps	Goals	Apps	Goals	Apps	Goals	Apps	Goals
Goalkeepers
1	GK	(Switzerland) SUI	Fabio Coltorti	0	0	0	0	0	0	0	0	0	0
22	GK	(Switzerland) SUI	Philipp Köhn	0	0	0	0	0	0	0	0	0	0
28	GK	(Switzerland) SUI	Yvon Mvogo	1	0	1	0	0	0	0	0	0	0
32	GK	(Hungary) HUN	Péter Gulácsi	47	0	33	0	2	0	6	0	6	0
Defenders
3	DF	(Brazil) BRA	Bernardo	27	1	15+3	1	1	0	1+2	0	2+3	0
4	DF	(Hungary) HUN	Willi Orbán	37	4	25+1	3	2	0	6	1	3	0
5	DF	(France) FRA	Dayot Upamecano	41	3	25+3	3	2	0	5	0	6	0
6	DF	(France) FRA	Ibrahima Konaté	20	0	14+2	0	0	0	0	0	3+1	0
16	DF	(Germany) GER	Lukas Klostermann	39	1	25+1	1	1+1	0	4+2	0	5	0
20	DF	(Germany) GER	Benno Schmitz	2	0	1+1	0	0	0	0	0	0	0
23	DF	(Germany) GER	Marcel Halstenberg	23	2	14+1	2	2	0	6	0	0	0
Midfielders
7	MF	(Austria) AUT	Marcel Sabitzer	34	5	21+1	3	2	2	5	0	3+2	0
8	MF	(Guinea) GUI	Naby Keïta	39	9	23+4	6	2	1	5	2	5	0
13	MF	(Austria) AUT	Stefan Ilsanker	28	0	14+7	0	0+1	0	3	0	1+2	0
24	MF	(Germany) GER	Dominik Kaiser	12	0	3+7	0	0+1	0	0+1	0	0	0
27	MF	(Austria) AUT	Konrad Laimer	29	0	14+8	0	1+1	0	0+1	0	4	0
31	MF	(Germany) GER	Diego Demme	41	0	25+5	0	0+1	0	3+1	0	5+1	0
44	MF	(Slovenia) SVN	Kevin Kampl	37	1	22+4	1	1	0	4+2	0	3+1	0
Forwards
9	FW	(Denmark) DEN	Yussuf Poulsen	41	5	18+12	4	2	1	2+2	0	2+3	0
10	FW	(Sweden) SWE	Emil Forsberg	33	5	15+6	2	1	1	5	2	3+3	0
11	FW	(Germany) GER	Timo Werner	45	21	28+4	13	1+1	1	4+2	3	5	4
17	FW	(Portugal) POR	Bruma	40	7	16+12	4	1	0	3+2	0	6	3
18	FW	(England) ENG	Ademola Lookman	11	5	7+4	5	0	0	0	0	0	0
29	FW	(France) FRA	Jean-Kévin Augustin	37	12	14+11	9	1	0	4+1	1	4+2	2
Players transferred out during the season
33	DF	(Germany) GER	Marvin Compper	3	0	1+1	0	0	0	0+1	0	0	0
19	FW	(Scotland) SCO	Oliver Burke	1	0	0	0	0+1	0	0	0	0	0

Last updated: 12 May 2018
Source: Competitions
