= Ibrahima Konaté =

French footballer (born 1999)

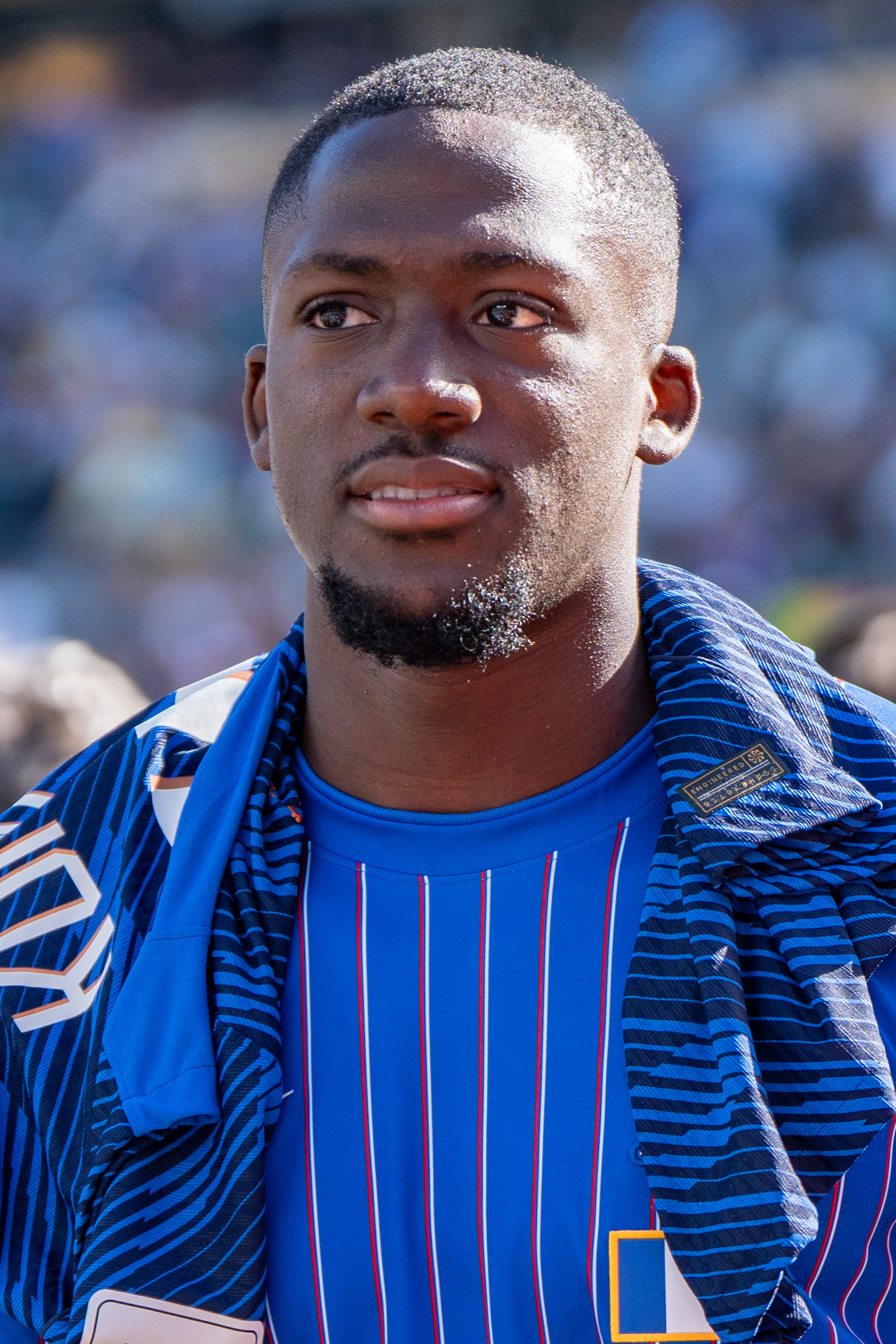
- Konaté with France in 2026

Personal information
- Full name: Ibrahima Konaté
- Date of birth: 25 May 1999 (age 27)
- Place of birth: Paris, France
- Height: 1.94 m (6 ft 4 in)
- Position: Centre-back

Team information
- Current team: Real Madrid
- Number: 16

Youth career
- 2009–2014: Paris FC
- 2014–2017: Sochaux

Senior career*
Years	Team	Apps	(Gls)
2016–2017	Sochaux II	9	(1)
2017	Sochaux	12	(1)
2017–2021	RB Leipzig	66	(2)
2021–2026	Liverpool	118	(2)
2026–	Real Madrid	12	(0)

International career^{‡}
2014–2015	France U16	12	(2)
2015–2016	France U17	7	(0)
2017	France U19	1	(0)
2018	France U20	1	(0)
2019–2021	France U21	13	(0)
2022–	France	31	(0)
Medal record
Men's football
Representing France
FIFA World Cup
Runner-up	2022 Qatar
UEFA Nations League
Third place	2025 Germany
- * Club domestic league appearances and goals as of 22:05, 21 November 2026 (UTC) ‡ National team caps and goals as of 22:22, 15 November 2026 (UTC)

Ibrahima Konaté (Note: French pronunciation: [ibʁaimˈa konatˈe]) (born 25 May 1999) is a French professional footballer who plays as a centre-back for La Liga club Real Madrid and the France national team.

Konaté started off his professional career with Sochaux, and moved to RB Leipzig in 2017. After four years with the club, Liverpool signed him in 2021 for a fee of £36 million. He won the EFL Cup and FA Cup in his first season, and later won the Premier League title with the club in the 2024–25 season, exiting the club as a free agent in July 2026 to join Real Madrid.

After representing them at various youth levels, Konaté made his senior debut for France in 2022 and was a member of the team that reached the final of the 2022 FIFA World Cup.

== Early life ==
Ibrahima Konaté was born on 25 May 1999 in Paris. He grew up in public housing in the 11th arrondissement of Paris, the second youngest of eight children born to parents from Mali.

== Club career ==
=== Early career ===
Konaté played as a teen for Paris FC youth teams. When he was 14, he left for Sochaux and joined their boarding academy at the age of 15. He started his career as a striker before moving to the defence, becoming a centre-back.

Konaté made his professional debut for Sochaux in a 1–0 Ligue 2 loss to Auxerre on 7 February 2017, at the age of 17.

=== RB Leipzig ===
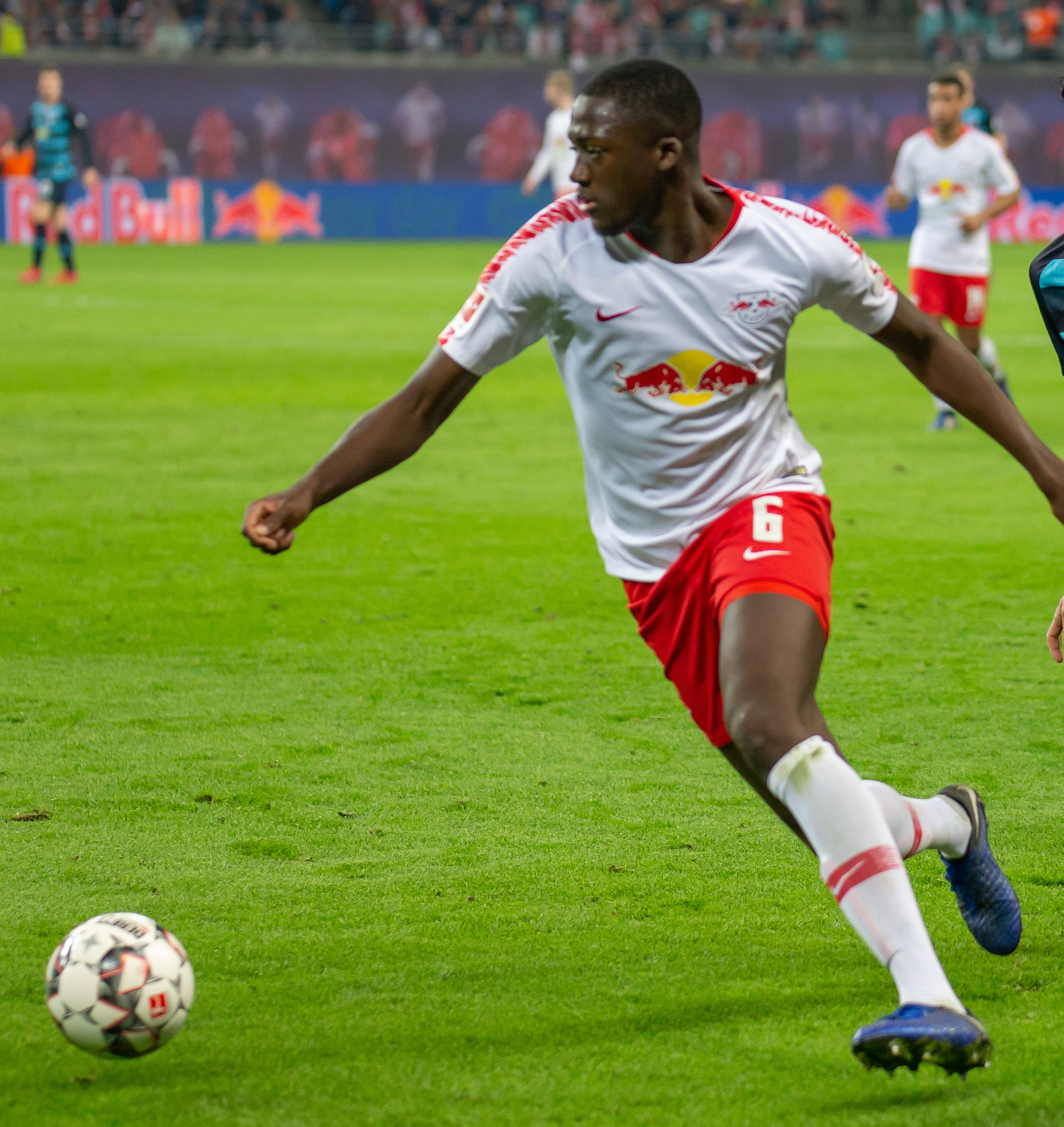
Konaté playing for RB Leipzig in 2019

After a successful debut season, with 12 games and 1 goal in half a season, Konaté joined RB Leipzig in the Bundesliga on 12 June 2017 on a five-year contract by free transfer. On 27 January 2019, Konaté scored his first Leipzig goal in a 4–0 win against Fortuna Düsseldorf.

=== Liverpool ===
On 28 May 2021, Premier League side Liverpool announced that they had reached an agreement with RB Leipzig to acquire Konaté on 1 July, pending international clearance and a work permit being granted to him. The club had already agreed personal terms with the player in April, and triggered his release clause of approximately £36 million in May 2021.

On 18 September, Konaté made his Liverpool and Premier League debut, starting alongside Virgil van Dijk and keeping a clean sheet in a 3–0 victory against Crystal Palace. He made his second start of the season partnering Virgil van Dijk in the first Northwest derby of the season, in which Liverpool beat Manchester United 5–0. It was the heaviest defeat inflicted on United by Liverpool since 1895 and the heaviest defeat United had suffered without scoring in since 1955. Konaté won plaudits for how he handled star players like Cristiano Ronaldo and Marcus Rashford, and featured in Garth Crooks' team of the week, with Crooks saying, "No frills or skills but he does use his power and strength to maximum effect."

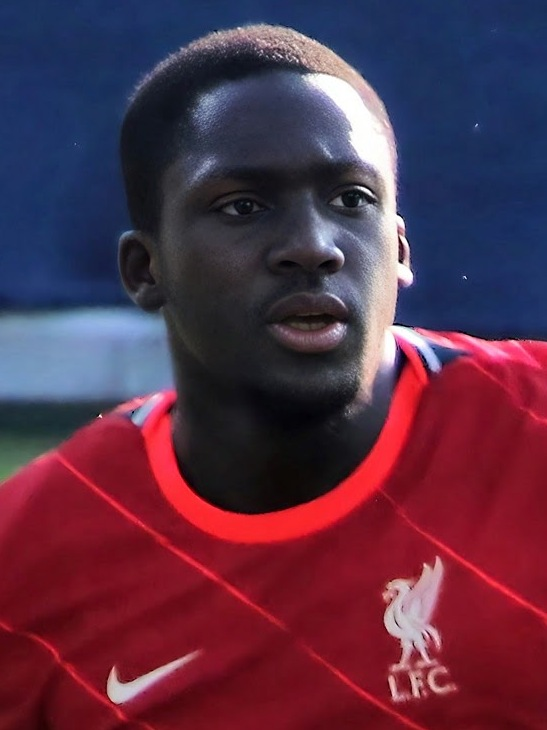
Konaté with Liverpool in 2021

On 5 April 2022, Konaté scored his first goal for Liverpool, a header in a 3–1 away victory against Benfica in the UEFA Champions League quarter-final first leg. He scored again in the second leg at home on 13 April, which ended in a 3–3 draw with his side winning 6–4 on aggregate to progress to the next round. Three days later on 16 April, he scored in a 3–2 FA Cup semi-final win over Manchester City at Wembley Stadium, helping Liverpool advance to the final. Konaté later missed the beginning of the 2022–23 season through injury.

Having not registered a goal since April 2022, Konaté returned to scoring ways on 17 September 2024 with a header in Liverpool's 3–1 away victory over AC Milan in the UEFA Champions League. On 28 September, he scored his first Premier League goal in a 2–1 away win against Wolverhampton Wanderers.

During the 2025–26 season, Konaté's performances have received criticism from the fans and media. On 31 January 2026, after being absent for three games due to the death of his father, Konaté returned to the squad and scored a late goal in a 4–1 win over Newcastle United.

On 20 March 2026, Liverpool released a statement that they are "appalled and disgusted" after racial abuse was targeted towards Konaté on social media. On 31 May 2026, Liverpool announced that Konaté would depart the club in the summer following unsuccessful negotiations over a new contract extension.

=== Real Madrid ===
On 18 June 2026, Konate signed for La Liga club Real Madrid on a four-year contract.

== International career ==
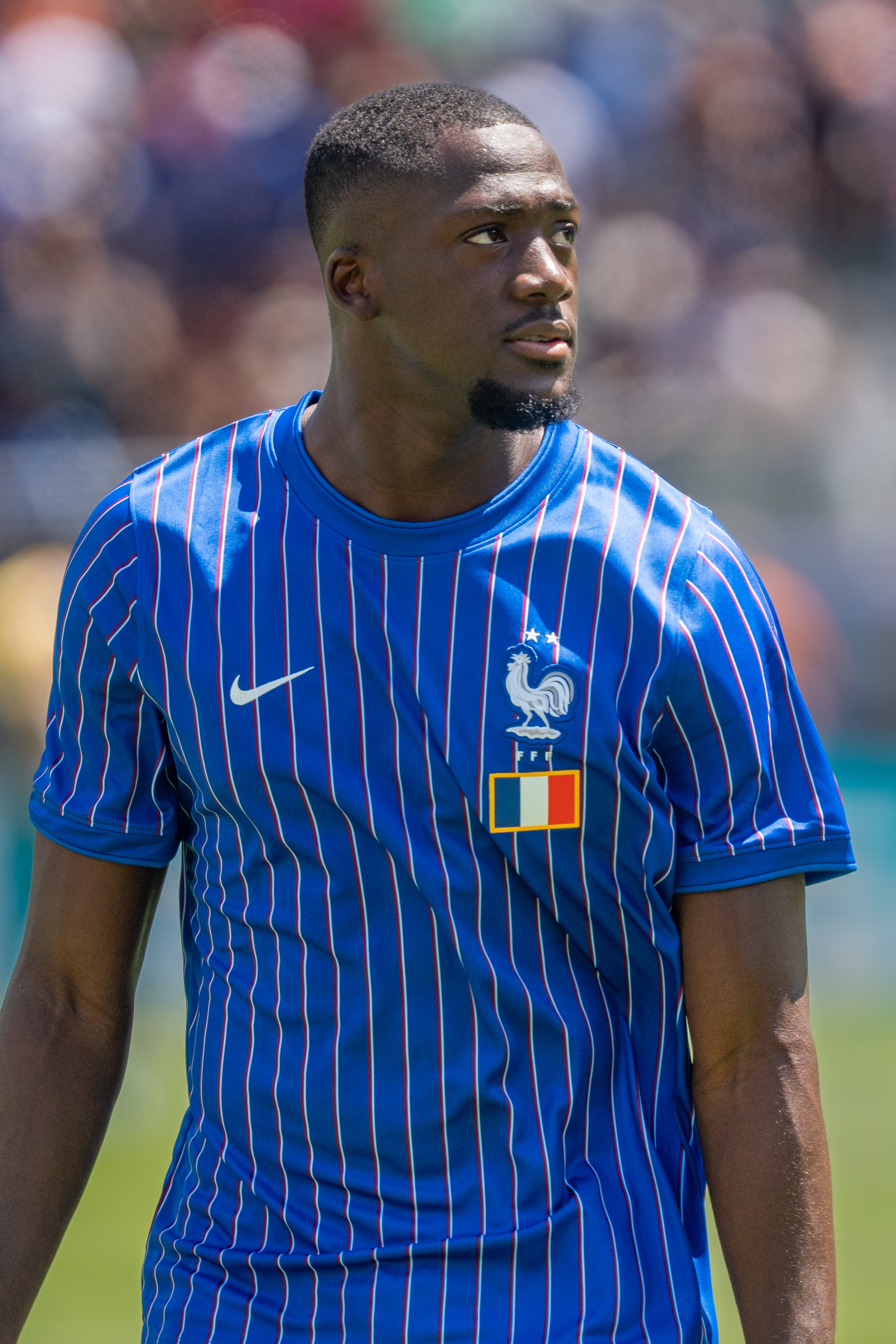
Konaté with France at the 2026 FIFA World Cup

Konaté received his first call-up to the senior France national team on 4 June 2022 for the UEFA Nations League, replacing Raphaël Varane due to injury. He made his full international debut on 10 June in a 1–1 draw against Austria. On 9 November, Konaté was included in Didier Deschamps's squad for the 2022 FIFA World Cup, where he helped France reach the final. On 18 November 2024, he captained his country in a 3–1 UEFA Nations League victory against Italy.

On 14 May 2026, Konaté was selected in the 26-man squad for the 2026 FIFA World Cup.

== Style of play ==
Konaté has been compared to Virgil van Dijk due to his positional play, tackling, pace and strength. Guido Schafer said that: "he is tall, fast, good technique and he is a little bit of Virgil van Dijk. He has very high-class potential. He is a great athlete, he has good speed and there are no silly tackles – he is an intelligent player." Konaté is also well known for his passing and strength in the air.

== Personal life ==
Konaté is a practising Muslim. He is a fan of anime and manga, with his favourite series being Attack on Titan.

Konaté's father, Hamady, died on 21 January 2026.

== Career statistics ==
=== Club ===
As of match played 21 November 2026

Appearances and goals by club, season and competition
Club	Season	League			National cup (Note: Includes DFB-Pokal, FA Cup, Copa del Rey)		League cup (Note: Includes Coupe de la Ligue, EFL Cup)		Europe		Other		Total	
Club	Season	Division	Apps	Goals	Apps	Goals	Apps	Goals	Apps	Goals	Apps	Goals	Apps	Goals
Sochaux II	2016–17	CFA 2	9	1	—		—		—		—		9	1
Sochaux	2016–17	Ligue 2	12	1	0	0	1	0	—		—		13	1
RB Leipzig	2017–18	Bundesliga	16	0	0	0	—		4 (Note: Appearances in UEFA Europa League)	0	—		20	0
RB Leipzig	2018–19	Bundesliga	28	1	6	0	—		9	2	—		43	3
RB Leipzig	2019–20	Bundesliga	8	0	1	0	—		2 (Note: Appearances in UEFA Champions League)	0	—		11	0
RB Leipzig	2020–21	Bundesliga	14	1	1	0	—		6	0	—		21	1
RB Leipzig	Total		66	2	8	0	—		21	2	—		95	4
Liverpool	2021–22	Premier League	11	0	6	1	4	0	8	2	—		29	3
Liverpool	2022–23	Premier League	18	0	3	0	0	0	3	0	0	0	24	0
Liverpool	2023–24	Premier League	22	0	3	0	5	0	7	0	—		37	0
Liverpool	2024–25	Premier League	31	1	0	0	4	0	7	1	—		42	2
Liverpool	2025–26	Premier League	36	1	4	0	0	0	10	1	1 (Note: Appearance in FA Community Shield)	0	51	2
Liverpool	Total		118	2	16	1	13	0	35	4	1	0	183	7
Real Madrid	2026–27	La Liga	12	0	0	0	—		2	0	0	0	14	0
Career total			217	6	24	1	14	0	58	6	1	0	314	13

=== International ===
As of match played 15 November 2026

Appearances and goals by national team and year
National team	Year	Apps	Goals
France	2022	7	0
France	2023	6	0
France	2024	8	0
France	2025	5	0
France	2026	5	0
Total		31	0

== Honours ==
RB Leipzig

- DFB-Pokal runner-up: 2018–19, 2020–21

Liverpool

- Premier League: 2024–25
- FA Cup: 2021–22
- EFL Cup: 2021–22, 2023–24; runner-up: 2024–25
- FA Community Shield: 2022
- UEFA Champions League runner-up: 2021–22

France

- FIFA World Cup runner-up: 2022
- UEFA Nations League third place: 2024–25
