= Yvon Mvogo =

Footballer (born 1994)

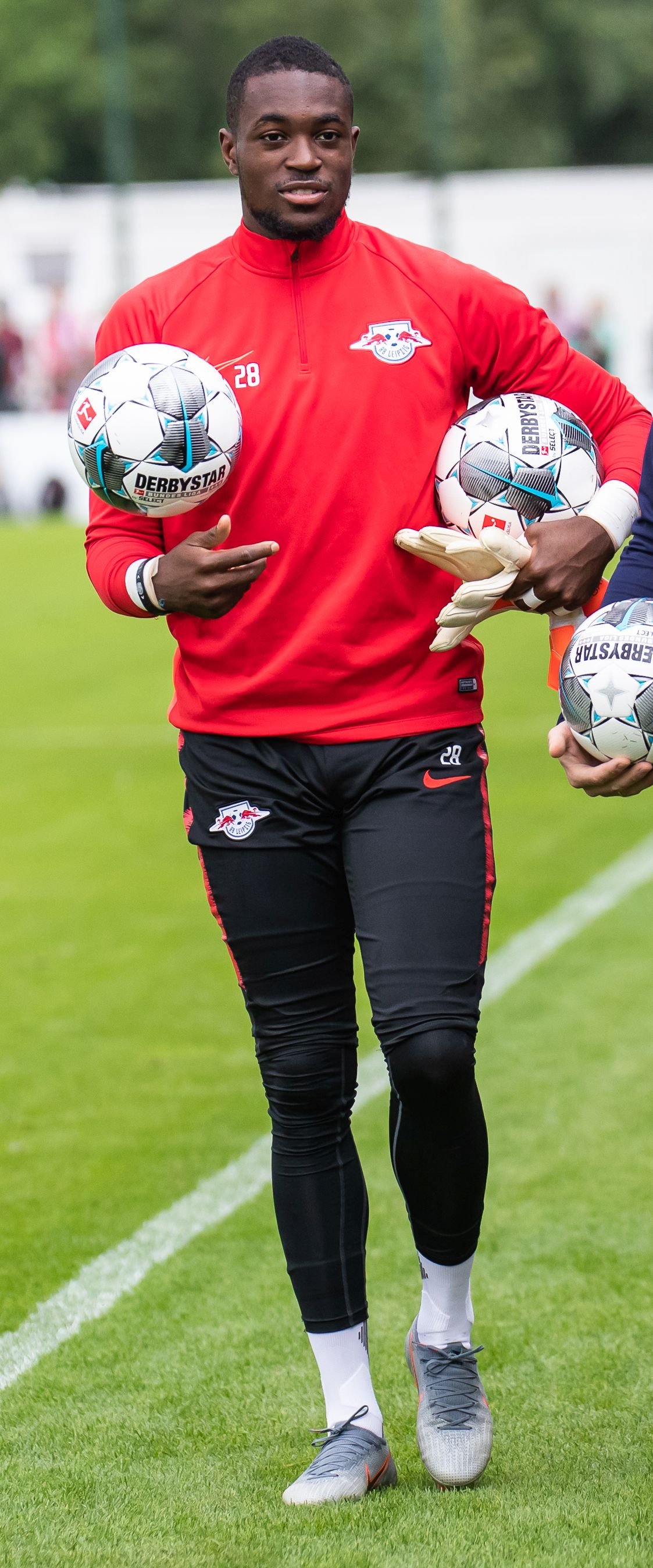
- Mvogo with RB Leipzig in 2019

Personal information
- Full name: Yvon Landry Mvogo Nganoma
- Date of birth: 6 June 1994 (age 32)
- Place of birth: Yaoundé, Cameroon
- Height: 1.87 m (6 ft 2 in)
- Position: Goalkeeper

Team information
- Current team: Lorient
- Number: 38

Youth career
- –2012: Young Boys

Senior career*
Years	Team	Apps	(Gls)
2011–2017	Young Boys	124	(0)
2017–2022	RB Leipzig	5	(0)
2020–2022	→ PSV (loan)	41	(0)
2022–	Lorient	119	(0)

International career^{‡}
2009	Switzerland U15	1	(0)
2009–2010	Switzerland U16	4	(0)
2011	Switzerland U17	4	(0)
2011–2012	Switzerland U18	5	(0)
2012–2013	Switzerland U18	9	(0)
2015	Switzerland U20	1	(0)
2013–2016	Switzerland U21	15	(0)
2018–	Switzerland	15	(0)
- * Club domestic league appearances and goals as of 19 May 2026 ‡ National team caps and goals as of 16 November 2026

Yvon Landry Mvogo Nganoma (born 6 June 1994) is a Swiss professional footballer who plays as a goalkeeper for Ligue 1 club Lorient. Born in Cameroon, he plays for the Switzerland national team.

== Club career ==
Mvogo was born in Yaoundé, Cameroon. He made his professional debut at 17 August 2013 in the Swiss Cup against Veyrier. He played the full game in an 8-0 away win.

In April 2017, it was revealed that Mvogo will be joining Bundesliga and future UEFA Champions League debutants Leipzig on 1 July 2017, after signing a four-year deal with the Saxony-based club.

On 25 August 2020, Mvogo signed for PSV on a two-year loan. On 14 July 2022, he signed a two-year contract with Lorient in France.

== International career ==
Mvogo got his first call up to the Switzerland senior national team squad for a UEFA Euro 2016 qualifier against Lithuania in June 2015. He was included in Switzerland's 23-man squad for the 2018 FIFA World Cup. He made his first appearance for the national team on 15 October 2018 against Iceland for a 2018–19 UEFA Nations League group match.

In May 2019, he was named to the national team for the 2019 UEFA Nations League Finals, but did not play in either of Switzerland's matches as his side finished fourth. In 2021 he was called up to the national team for the 2020 UEFA European Championship, where the team created one of the main sensations of the tournament reaching the quarter-finals.

Mvogo returned to the Switzerland national team in September 2023 and played during a pair of matches against Andorra and Romania during UEFA Euro 2024 qualification.

On 20 May 2026, Mvogo was selected in the 26-man squad for the 2026 FIFA World Cup.

== Career statistics ==
=== Club ===
As of match played 17 May 2026

Appearances and goals by club, season and competition
Club	Season	League			National cup		Europe		Other		Total	
Club	Season	Division	Apps	Goals	Apps	Goals	Apps	Goals	Apps	Goals	Apps	Goals
Young Boys	2011–12	Swiss Super League	0	0	0	0	0	0	—		0	0
Young Boys	2012–13	Swiss Super League	0	0	0	0	0	0	—		0	0
Young Boys	2013–14	Swiss Super League	20	0	1	0	—		—		21	0
Young Boys	2014–15	Swiss Super League	35	0	0	0	11 (Note: Appearances in UEFA Europa League)	0	—		46	0
Young Boys	2015–16	Swiss Super League	34	0	2	0	4 (Note: Two appearances in UEFA Champions League, two appearances in UEFA Europa League)	0	—		40	0
Young Boys	2016–17	Swiss Super League	35	0	2	0	10 (Note: Four appearances in UEFA Champions League, six appearances in UEFA Europa League)	0	—		47	0
Young Boys	Total		124	0	5	0	25	0	—		154	0
RB Leipzig	2017–18	Bundesliga	1	0	0	0	0	0	—		1	0
RB Leipzig	2018–19	Bundesliga	2	0	0	0	10	0	—		12	0
RB Leipzig	2019–20	Bundesliga	2	0	3	0	1 (Note: Appearance in UEFA Champions League)	0	—		6	0
RB Leipzig	Total		5	0	3	0	11	0	—		19	0
PSV Eindhoven (loan)	2020–21	Eredivisie	33	0	0	0	10	0	—		43	0
PSV Eindhoven (loan)	2021–22	Eredivisie	8	0	1	0	2 (Note: Appearances in UEFA Europa Conference League)	0	0	0	11	0
PSV Eindhoven (loan)	Total		41	0	1	0	12	0	0	0	54	0
Lorient	2022–23	Ligue 1	21	0	0	0	—		—		21	0
Lorient	2023–24	Ligue 1	34	0	0	0	—		—		34	0
Lorient	2024–25	Ligue 2	33	0	0	0	—		—		33	0
Lorient	2025–26	Ligue 1	31	0	0	0	—		—		31	0
Lorient	2026–27	Ligue 1	0	0	0	0	—		—		0	0
Lorient	Total		119	0	0	0	—		—		119	0
Career total			289	0	9	0	58	0	0	0	356	0

=== International ===
As of match played 16 November 2026

Appearances and goals by national team and year
National team	Year	Apps	Goals
Switzerland	2018	2	0
Switzerland	2019	0	0
Switzerland	2020	1	0
Switzerland	2021	1	0
Switzerland	2022	0	0
Switzerland	2023	2	0
Switzerland	2024	4	0
Switzerland	2025	1	0
Switzerland	2026	5	0
Total		15	0

== Honours ==
PSV

- KNVB Cup: 2021–22
- Johan Cruyff Shield: 2021

Lorient

- Ligue 2: 2024–25

Individual

- Eredivisie Team of the Month: May 2022
- UNFP Ligue 2 Goalkeeper of the Year: 2024–25
- UNFP Ligue 2 Team of the Year: 2024–25
