= Péter Gulácsi =

Hungarian footballer (born 1990)

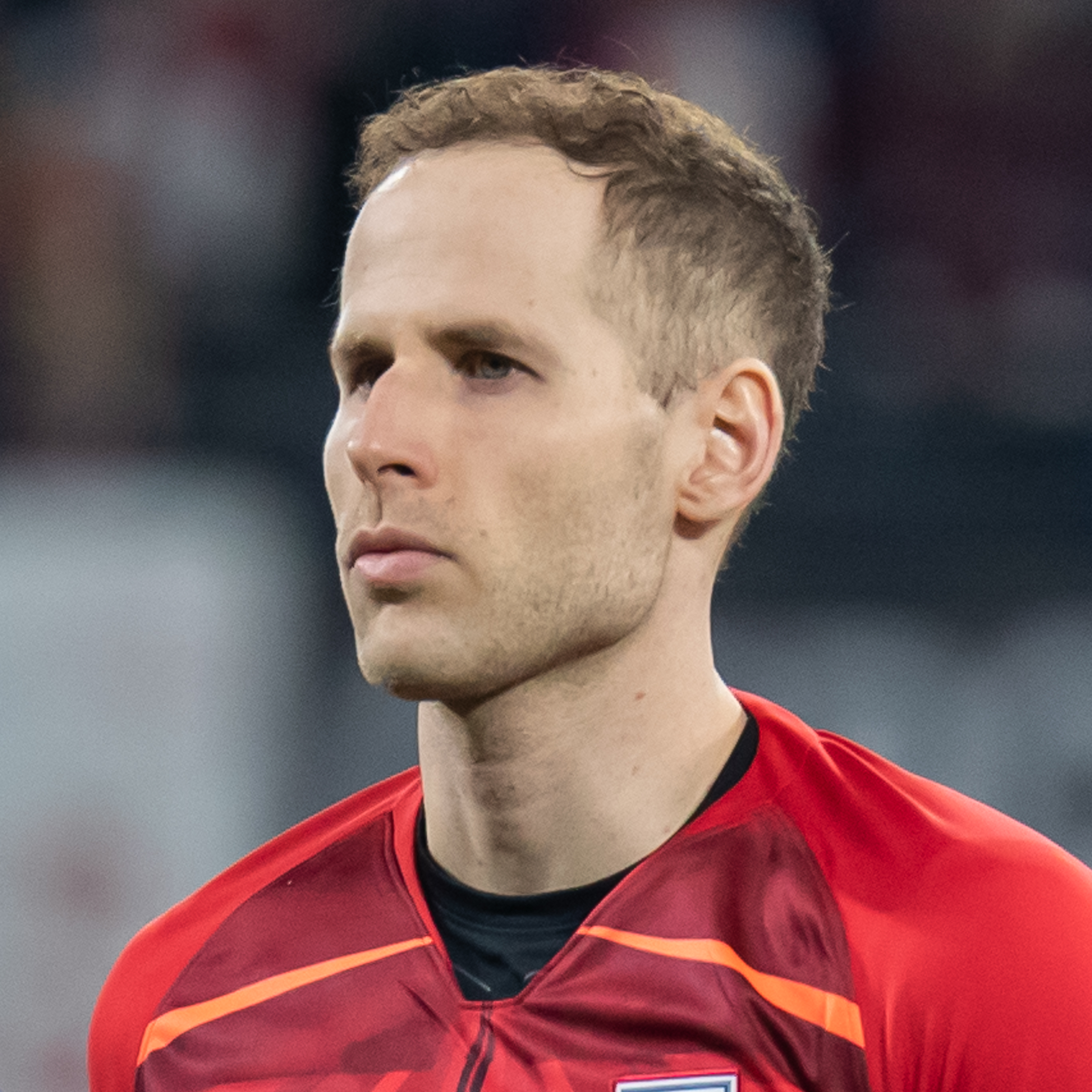
- Gulácsi with RB Leipzig in 2020

Personal information
- Full name: Péter Gulácsi
- Date of birth: 6 May 1990 (age 36)
- Place of birth: Budapest, Hungary
- Height: 1.93 m (6 ft 4 in)
- Position: Goalkeeper

Team information
- Current team: Villarreal
- Number: 25

Youth career
- 2007–2008: MTK Budapest
- 2007–2008: → Liverpool (loan)

Senior career*
Years	Team	Apps	(Gls)
2008–2013	Liverpool	0	(0)
2009	→ Hereford United (loan)	18	(0)
2010	→ Tranmere Rovers (loan)	17	(0)
2011–2012	→ Hull City (loan)	15	(0)
2013–2015	Red Bull Salzburg	65	(0)
2015–2026	RB Leipzig	284	(0)
2026–	Villarreal	9	(0)

International career
2007	Hungary U17	4	(0)
2008	Hungary U19	15	(0)
2008–2009	Hungary U20	12	(0)
2009–2012	Hungary U21	26	(0)
2014–2025	Hungary	58	(0)
Medal record
Representing Hungary
Men's football
FIFA U-20 World Cup
Bronze medal – third place	2009
- * Club domestic league appearances and goals as of 17:48, 22 November 2026 (UTC)

Péter Gulácsi (born 6 May 1990) is a Hungarian professional footballer who plays as a goalkeeper for La Liga club Villarreal.

Gulácsi began his career at Liverpool but did not make a senior appearance, spending loan spells at fellow English clubs Hereford United, Tranmere Rovers, and Hull City. In 2013, he joined Red Bull Salzburg, where he won a domestic double twice, namely the Austrian Bundesliga and Austrian Cup. He later moved to RB Leipzig in 2015, becoming a key figure in their rise to the Bundesliga and UEFA Champions League contention. Appointed captain in 2021, he played a key role in securing the club's first-ever DFB-Pokal title in 2022. After eleven years at the German club, Gulácsi signed for La Liga side Villarreal in 2026.

A full international for Hungary between 2014 and 2025, Gulácsi had represented his country in multiple major tournaments, featuring in the 2016, 2020, and 2024 editions of the UEFA European Championship.

== Club career ==
=== Liverpool ===
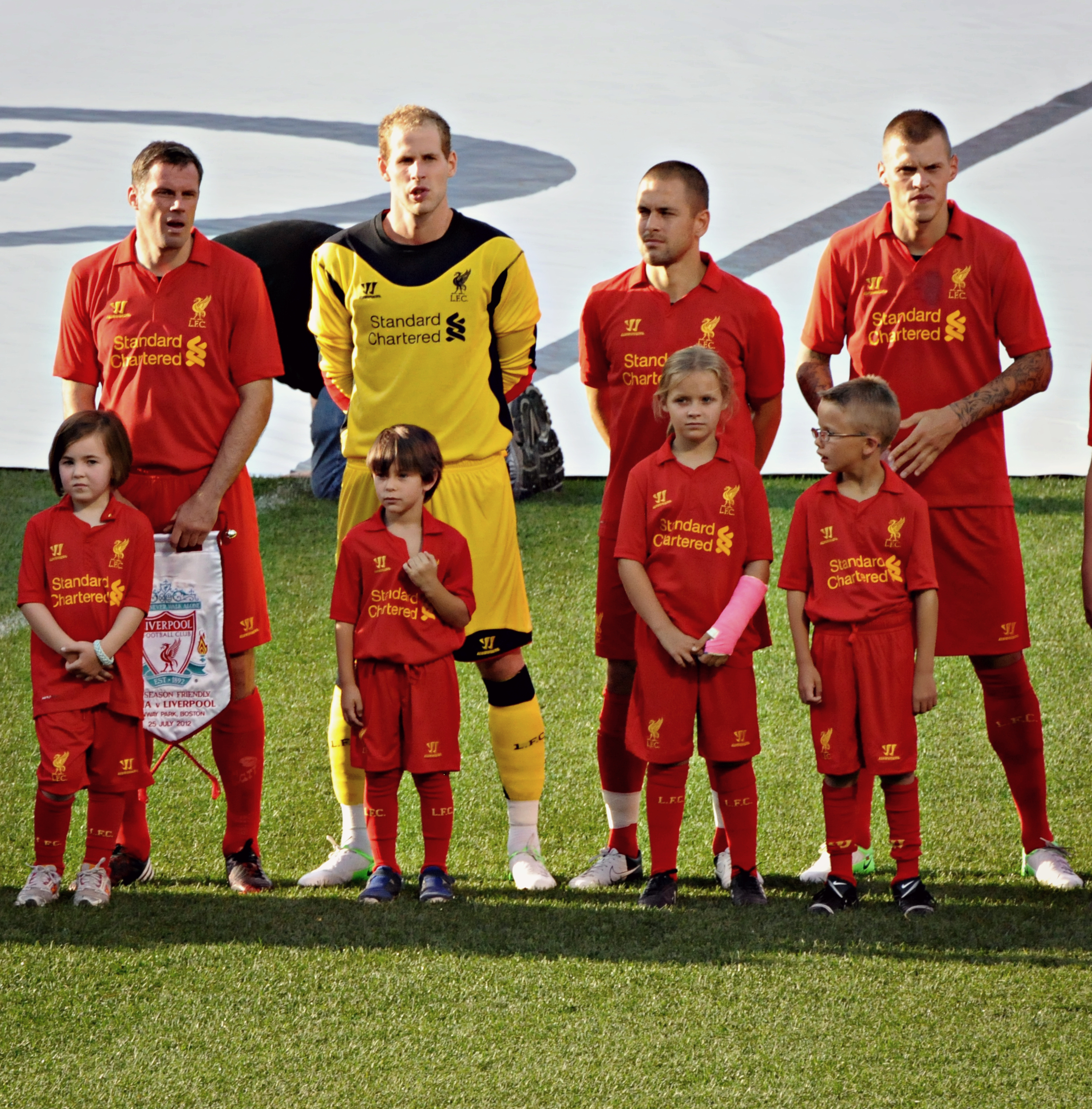
Gulácsi (in yellow) lining up with (from left to right) Jamie Carragher, Joe Cole and Martin Škrtel for Liverpool

English Premier League club Liverpool signed Gulácsi from MTK Budapest on a one-year loan in 2007, with the player competing in the treble winning reserve team. Liverpool had an option to buy him at the end of this loan deal, which they exercised on the last day of the transfer window, 1 September 2008. Gulácsi was the third person to sign for Liverpool from MTK, with previous signings being compatriots András Simon and Krisztián Németh.

On 29 July and 5 August 2010 respectively, he was the substitute goalkeeper in both of Liverpool's UEFA Europa League ties against Rabotnički, with Liverpool winning 2–0 on both occasions. He also found himself on the bench on 26 August in Liverpool's Europa League tie against Trabzonspor. He was a frequent presence on the subs bench in January 2011, with Brad Jones away at the AFC Asian Cup. With Jones still away at the Asian Cup, Gulácsi was the substitute keeper for their 1–0 Premier League win over Chelsea at Stamford Bridge. Gulácsi retained his spot as back-up to Pepe Reina after Brad Jones returned from international duty, with the latter moving to Derby County on a loan transfer in March 2011.

In the 2009 transfer window in January, Gulácsi was loaned to Hereford United, where he made his league debut. He went on to make 18 league appearances for the club.

On 16 April 2010, Gulácsi joined Tranmere Rovers on an emergency seven-day loan deal and made his debut for the club on 17 April against Exeter City in a 3–1 win for Tranmere. His loan was subsequently extended for an additional seven days and into a third week.

He re-joined Rovers on a one-month emergency loan on 17 September 2010 after Tranmere's two goalkeepers Gunnar Nielsen and Simon Miotto were ruled out with injuries. In October, his loan deal was extended into a second month until 24 November 2010.

==== Hull City (loan) ====
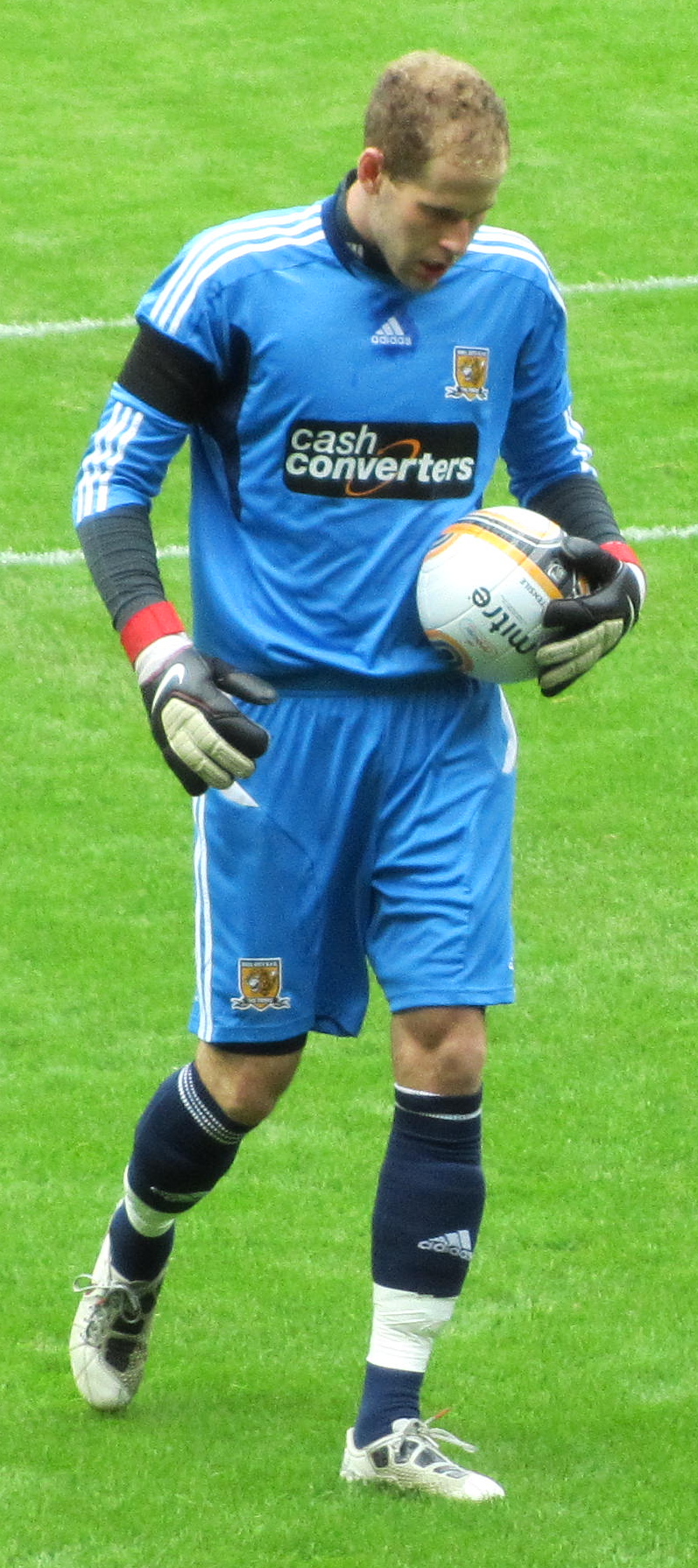
Gulácsi playing for Hull City in 2011

On 19 July 2011, he signed a new contract with Liverpool and joined Championship team Hull City in a year-long loan move. He made his full debut for Hull in a start of the season clash against then-recently relegated Blackpool at the KC Stadium.

He received a knee injury in a 1–0 defeat at Burnley on 31 December 2011 and was substituted for Adriano Basso on the 42nd minute mark, shortly after conceding a goal, scored by Martin Paterson, as a result of a defensive mix-up with Jack Hobbs. Following the injury, Gulácsi returned to Liverpool for a scan on his knee.

On 11 April 2012, Liverpool contacted Hull with a view to recalling Gulácsi from his loan subject to Premier League, Football League and FA approval. Liverpool were at that time suffering a goalkeeper shortage, with both Pepe Reina and Doni serving suspensions, leaving Brad Jones as their only remaining senior goalkeeper. He finished his time with Hull City with 15 appearances.

==== Return to Liverpool ====
The loan recall was approved and Gulácsi took his place on the bench for the FA Cup semi-final, which Liverpool won 2–1. He featured in all three of Liverpool's pre-season games in North America.

=== Red Bull Salzburg ===
On 7 June 2014, Austrian side Red Bull Salzburg announced they had signed Gulácsi on a free transfer from Liverpool on a four-year deal. He played his first match for Salzburg colors in the ÖFB-Cup, against Union St. Florian from the third division, in an eventual 9–0 away win. On 20 July 2013, he made his debut in the Austrian Bundesliga against Wiener Neustadt at an eventual 5–1 away win.

=== RB Leipzig ===
==== 2015–2020: 2. Bundesliga to Champions League semi-finals ====
On 1 July 2015, Gulácsi transferred to RB Leipzig, the sister club of Red Bull Salzburg, for a fee of 3 million pounds. He finished the 2015–16 season by making 15 appearances for the first team and two appearances in the Regionalliga Nordost for the reserve team.

On 17 December 2017, Gulácsi signed a new contract with RB Leipzig. His contract with the club would have expired in 2020 but he prolonged it by 2022. He finished the 2016–17 season with 34 appearances. Gulácsi was selected as the best goalkeeper of the autumn part of the 2017–18 Bundesliga season by the German sport magazine Kicker. He finished the 2017–18 season with 47 appearances. According to leading German sports magazine Kicker, Gulácsi performed best in the Bundesliga's 2018–19 season matchday ratings with an average score of 2.61 and 16 clean sheets.

In the 2019–20 season, Gulácsi made history by qualifying as the first Hungarian for the UEFA Champions League semi-finals, the first time ever for RB Leipzig.

==== 2021–2026: Contract extension and club captaincy ====
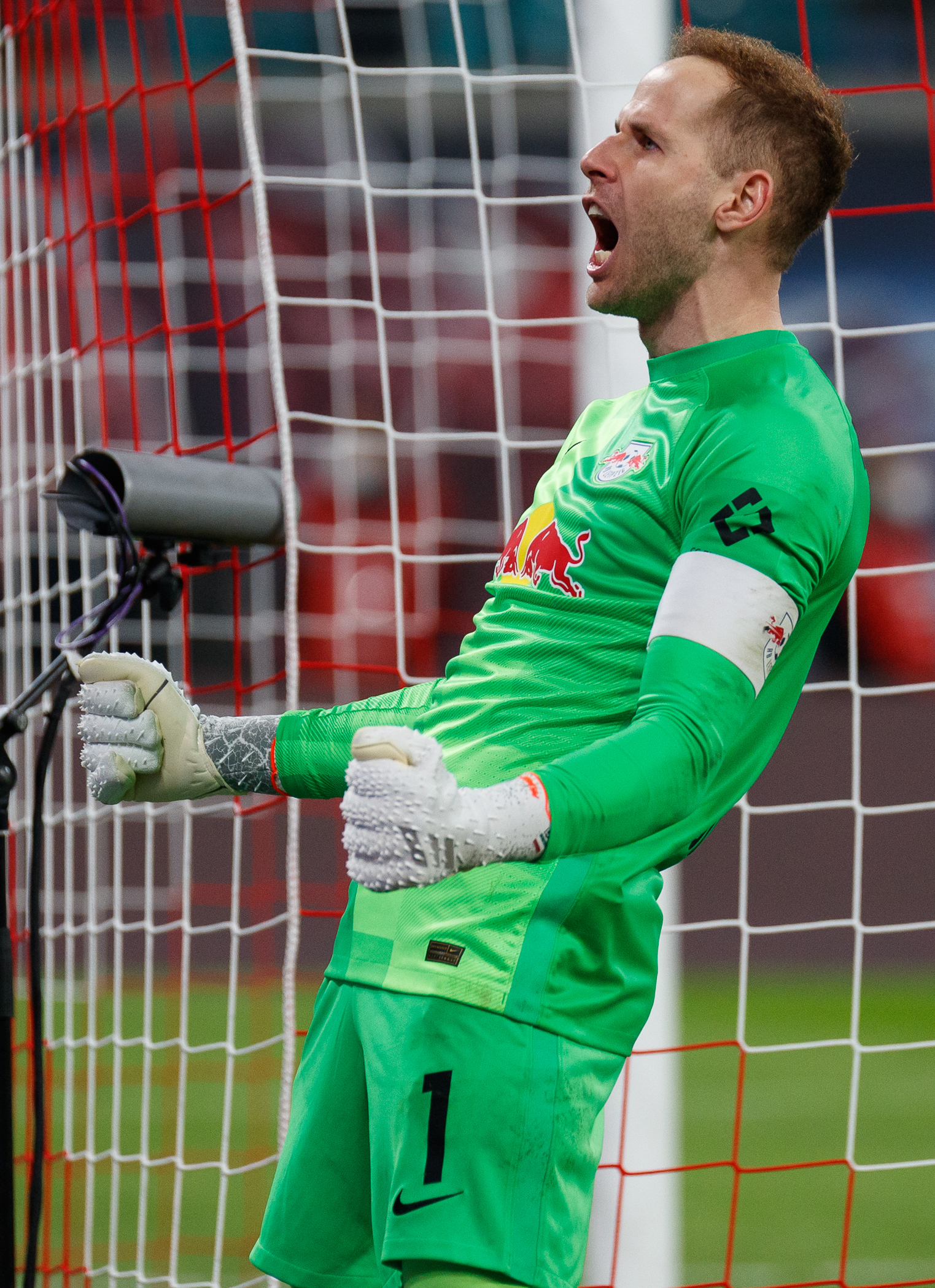
Gulácsi with RB Leipzig in 2021

On 7 May 2021, Gulácsi signed a four-year contract extension with Leipzig, keeping him with the club until June 2025. Following the departure of Marcel Sabitzer to Bayern Munich, Gulácsi was appointed as Leipzig's captain in September. On 23 May 2022, Gulácsi helped Leipzig claim their first piece of major silverware in club history in winning the DFB-Pokal. In the final against Freiburg, Gulácsi forced two misses in the penalty shoot-out. On 5 October, he tore the anterior cruciate ligament (ACL) in his right knee, in a 3–1 win against Celtic in the Champions League, which forced him to miss the rest of the season, with compatriot Willi Orbán quietly replacing Gulácsi as captain.

On 27 September 2023, he returned from his injury and played the entire match against Wehen Wiesbaden in the 2023–24 DFB-Pokal, which ended with a 3–2 away victory for Leipzig. On 4 February 2024, he played his first Bundesliga match since recovering in a 2–0 victory over Union Berlin on game week 20 of the 2023–24 season, returning to the starting line-up after a lengthy absence. In December, he was rated as the best goalkeeper of the first half of the 2024–25 Bundesliga season by Kicker.

=== Villarreal ===
On 3 August 2026, Gulácsi departed Leipzig and moved to La Liga side Villarreal on a two-year deal.

== International career ==
=== Youth ===
Gulácsi helped Hungary prevail over the Czech Republic in the 2009 FIFA U-20 World Cup in the penalty shoot-outs. In the third-place match between Hungary and Costa Rica at the tournament, he saved three penalties during the penalty shoot-out, leading his team to victory and bronze medals.

=== Senior ===
Gulácsi made his senior debut for Hungary on 22 May 2014 in a 2–2 friendly draw against Denmark. He was selected for Hungary's UEFA Euro 2016 squad, serving as second-choice goalkeeper to Gábor Király. After Király's retirement from the national team in August 2016, Gulácsi became Hungary's first-choice goalkeeper, playing in every match during the 2018 FIFA World Cup qualification campaign, where they eventually failed to qualify for the tournament.

On 1 June 2021, Gulácsi was included in the final 26-man squad for the rescheduled UEFA Euro 2020 tournament. He played all three Group F matches as the Hungarians lost to Portugal and drew with both France and Germany.

On 23 September 2022, Gulácsi made his 50th appearance for Hungary, keeping a clean sheet against Germany in a 1–0 UEFA Nations League fixture at his club RB Leipzig's Red Bull Arena. His cruciate ligament injury in October saw Dénes Dibusz replacing him as first-choice goalkeeper for the UEFA Euro 2024 qualifying campaign, with the Hungarians going unbeaten throughout 2023. Gulácsi returned to the Hungarian line-up on 22 March 2024, keeping a clean sheet in a 1–0 victory against Turkey at the Puskás Aréna.

On 14 May 2024, Gulácsi was named in Hungary's squad for UEFA Euro 2024. He was selected to start ahead of Dibusz by coach Marco Rossi for the team's opening Group A match against Switzerland which they lost 3–1. On 23 June, he kept his first clean sheet at a major international tournament as Hungary beat Scotland 1–0 in Stuttgart.

On 19 May 2025, Gulácsi announced his retirement from international football.

== Personal life ==
In 2021, a post on Gulácsi's Facebook page expressed his wish to join the Family Is Family campaign in Hungary, a campaign that promotes acceptance of same-sex marriage and LGBT rights in Hungary. Former Hungary international player János Hrutka stood by Gulácsi's decision. Subsequently, Hrutka was fired from the TV channel Spíler TV he was working for as a commentator.

== Career statistics ==
=== Club ===
As of match played 22 November 2026

Appearances and goals by club, season and competition
Club	Season	League			National cup (Note: Includes FA Cup, Austrian Cup, DFB-Pokal)		Europe		Other		Total	
Club	Season	Division	Apps	Goals	Apps	Goals	Apps	Goals	Apps	Goals	Apps	Goals
Liverpool	2008–09	Premier League	0	0	0	0	0	0	0	0	0	0
Liverpool	2009–10	Premier League	0	0	0	0	0	0	0	0	0	0
Liverpool	2010–11	Premier League	0	0	0	0	0	0	0	0	0	0
Liverpool	2011–12	Premier League	0	0	0	0	0	0	0	0	0	0
Liverpool	2012–13	Premier League	0	0	0	0	0	0	0	0	0	0
Liverpool	Total		0	0	0	0	0	0	0	0	0	0
Hereford United (loan)	2008–09	League One	18	0	0	0	—		—		18	0
Tranmere Rovers (loan)	2009–10	League One	5	0	0	0	—		—		5	0
Tranmere Rovers (loan)	2010–11	League One	12	0	0	0	—		2 (Note: Appearances in Football League Trophy)	0	14	0
Tranmere Rovers (loan)	Total		17	0	0	0	—		2	0	19	0
Hull City (loan)	2011–12	Championship	15	0	0	0	—		—		15	0
Red Bull Salzburg	2013–14	Austrian Bundesliga	31	0	5	0	14 (Note: Two appearances in UEFA Champions League, twelve appearances in UEFA Europa League)	0	—		50	0
Red Bull Salzburg	2014–15	Austrian Bundesliga	34	0	5	0	11 (Note: Four appearances in UEFA Champions League, seven appearances in UEFA Europa League)	0	—		50	0
Red Bull Salzburg	Total		65	0	10	0	25	0	—		100	0
RB Leipzig II	2015–16	Regionalliga Nordost	2	0	—		—		—		2	0
RB Leipzig	2015–16	2. Bundesliga	14	0	1	0	—		—		15	0
RB Leipzig	2016–17	Bundesliga	33	0	1	0	—		—		34	0
RB Leipzig	2017–18	Bundesliga	33	0	2	0	12 (Note: Six appearances in UEFA Champions League, six appearances in UEFA Europa League)	0	—		47	0
RB Leipzig	2018–19	Bundesliga	33	0	6	0	1 (Note: Appearance(s) in UEFA Europa League)	0	—		40	0
RB Leipzig	2019–20	Bundesliga	32	0	0	0	10	0	—		42	0
RB Leipzig	2020–21	Bundesliga	33	0	6	0	8 (Note: Appearances in UEFA Champions League)	0	—		47	0
RB Leipzig	2021–22	Bundesliga	33	0	5	0	11 (Note: Five appearances in UEFA Champions League, six appearances in UEFA Europa League)	0	—		49	0
RB Leipzig	2022–23	Bundesliga	6	0	0	0	3	0	1 (Note: Appearance in DFL-Supercup)	0	10	0
RB Leipzig	2023–24	Bundesliga	13	0	2	0	3	0	0	0	18	0
RB Leipzig	2024–25	Bundesliga	30	0	1	0	6	0	—		37	0
RB Leipzig	2025–26	Bundesliga	23	0	0	0	—		—		23	0
RB Leipzig	Total		283	0	24	0	54	0	1	0	362	0
Villarreal	2026–27	La Liga	9	0	0	0	3	0	—		12	0
Career total			409	0	34	0	82	0	3	0	528	0

=== International ===
Appearances and goals by national team and year
National team	Year	Apps	Goals
Hungary	2013	0	0
Hungary	2014	2	0
Hungary	2015	0	0
Hungary	2016	5	0
Hungary	2017	7	0
Hungary	2018	9	0
Hungary	2019	8	0
Hungary	2020	5	0
Hungary	2021	10	0
Hungary	2022	5	0
Hungary	2023	0	0
Hungary	2024	7	0
Hungary	2025	0	0
Total		58	0

== Honours ==
Red Bull Salzburg

- Austrian Bundesliga: 2013–14, 2014–15
- Austrian Cup: 2013–14, 2014–15

RB Leipzig

- DFB-Pokal: 2021–22, 2022–23; runner-up: 2018–19, 2020–21

Hungary U20

- FIFA U-20 World Cup third place: 2009

Individual

- kicker Bundesliga Team of the Season: 2018–19, 2024–25
- Hungarian Footballer of the Year (Golden Ball): 2018, 2019
