= 2018–19 RB Leipzig season =

RB Leipzig
2018–19 season
- Chairman: Oliver Mintzlaff
- Manager: Ralf Rangnick
- Stadium: Red Bull Arena
- Bundesliga: 3rd
- DFB-Pokal: Runners-up
- UEFA Europa League: Group stage
- Top goalscorer: League: Timo Werner (16); All: Yussuf Poulsen; Timo Werner (19 each)
- Highest home attendance: 41,939
- Lowest home attendance: 16,648
- Average home league attendance: 38,380
- Biggest win: Leipzig 6–0 Nürnberg
- Biggest defeat: Dortmund 4–1 Leipzig; Freiburg 3–0 Leipzig; Leipzig 0–3 Bayern
Home colours	Away colours	Third colours

The 2018–19 RB Leipzig season was the 10th season in the club's history and 3rd consecutive and overall season in the top flight of German football, the Bundesliga, having been promoted from the 2. Bundesliga in 2016. In addition to the domestic league, RB Leipzig also participated in the season's editions of the domestic cup, the DFB-Pokal, and the second-tier continental cup, the UEFA Europa League. This was the 9th season for Leipzig in the Red Bull Arena, located in Leipzig, Saxony, Germany. The season covers a period from 1 July 2018 to 30 June 2019.

== Players ==
=== Transfers ===
==== In ====
No.	Pos	Player	From	Type	Window	Ends	Fee	Source
3	DF	(Uruguay) Marcelo Saracchi	(Argentina) River Plate	Transfer	Summer	2023	€12,000,000	
8	MF	(Mali) Amadou Haidara	(Austria) RB Salzburg	Transfer	Winter	2023	Undisclosed	
18	MF	(England) Emile Smith Rowe	(England) Arsenal FC	Loan	Winter	2019	N/A	
20	FW	(Brazil) Matheus Cunha	(Switzerland) FC Sion	Transfer	Summer	2023	€15,000,000	
21	GK	(Germany) Marius Müller	1. FC Kaiserslautern	Loan return	Summer	2019	Free	
22	DF	(France) Nordi Mukiele	(France) Montpellier	Transfer	Summer	2023	€16,000,000	
33	DF	(Turkey) Atınç Nukan	(Turkey) Beşiktaş	Loan return	Summer	2020	Free	
35	MF	(Belgium) Massimo Bruno	(Belgium) Anderlecht	Loan return	Summer	2019	Free	
–	MF	(Germany) Elias Abouchabaka	RB Leipzig U19	Promoted	Summer	2021	Free	
–	MF	(Germany) Felix Beiersdorf	Chemie Leipzig	Loan return	Summer	2021	Free	
–	FW	(Israel) Omer Damari	(Israel) Maccabi Haifa	Loan return	Summer	2018	Free	
–	MF	(Germany) Agyemang Diawusie	Wehen Wiesbaden	Loan return	Summer	2020	Free	
–	MF	(Germany) Vitaly Janelt	VfL Bochum	Loan return	Summer	2021	Free	
—	DF	(Germany) Anthony Jung	(Denmark) Brøndby IF	Loan return	Summer	2019	Free	
—	MF	(Hungary) Zsolt Kalmár	(Slovakia) Dunajská Streda	Loan return	Summer	2019	Free	
—	DF	(Germany) Dominic Minz	RB Leipzig U19	Promoted	Summer	Undisclosed	Free	

==== Out ====
No.	Pos	Player	To	Type	Window	Fee	Source
1	GK	(Switzerland) Fabio Coltorti		End of contract	Summer	Free	
3	DF	(Brazil) Bernardo	(England) Brighton & Hove Albion	Transfer	Summer	€10,000,000	
8	MF	(Guinea) Naby Keïta	(England) Liverpool	Transfer	Summer	€60,000,000	
18	FW	(England) Ademola Lookman	(England) Everton	Loan return	Summer	Free	
20	DF	(Germany) Benno Schmitz	1. FC Köln	Transfer	Summer	€1,500,000	
22	GK	(Switzerland) Philipp Köhn	(Austria) RB Salzburg	Transfer	Summer	Undisclosed	
24	MF	(Germany) Dominik Kaiser	(Denmark) Brøndby IF	Transfer	Summer	Free	
—	MF	(Germany) Elias Abouchabaka	Greuther Fürth	Loan	Summer	Free	
–	MF	(Germany) Felix Beiersdorf	ZFC Meuselwitz	Loan	Summer	Free	
—	FW	(Israel) Omer Damari	(Israel) Hapoel Tel Aviv	Transfer	Summer	Free	
—	FW	(Germany) Agyemang Diawusie	Ingolstadt 04	Transfer	Summer	€500,000	
—	MF	(Germany) Vitaly Janelt	VfL Bochum	Transfer	Summer	Undisclosed	
—	DF	(Germany) Anthony Jung	(Denmark) Brøndby IF	Transfer	Summer	€800,000	
—	MF	(Hungary) Zsolt Kalmár	(Slovakia) Dunajská Streda	Transfer	Summer	Undisclosed	

== Kits ==
Home	Home alt.	Home alt. 2	Away	Away alt.	Third	Third alt.	10th Anniversary (2018–19)

== Competitions ==
Win Draw Loss

=== Overview ===
Competition	First match	Last match	Starting round	Final position	Record							
Competition	First match	Last match	Starting round	Final position	Pld	W	D	L	GF	GA	GD	Win %
Bundesliga	26 August 2018	18 May 2019	Matchday 1	3rd	34	19	9	6	63	29	+34	55.88
DFB-Pokal	19 August 2018	25 May 2019	First round	Runners-up	6	5	0	1	11	6	+5	83.33
Europa League	26 September 2018	13 December 2018	Second qualifying round	Group stage	12	5	4	3	21	13	+8	41.67
Total					52	29	13	10	95	48	+47	55.77

Last updated: 25 May 2019
Source: Competitions

=== Bundesliga ===
==== League table ====
Pos	Team	Pld	W	D	L	GF	GA	GD	Pts	Qualification or relegation
1	Bayern Munich (C)	34	24	6	4	88	32	+56	78	Qualification for the Champions League group stage
2	Borussia Dortmund	34	23	7	4	81	44	+37	76	Qualification for the Champions League group stage
3	RB Leipzig	34	19	9	6	63	29	+34	66	Qualification for the Champions League group stage
4	Bayer Leverkusen	34	18	4	12	69	52	+17	58	Qualification for the Champions League group stage
5	Borussia Mönchengladbach	34	16	7	11	55	42	+13	55	Qualification for the Europa League group stage (Note: Since the winners of the 2018–19 DFB-Pokal, Bayern Munich, qualified for the Champions League based on league position, the Europa League group stage spot was passed to the sixth-placed team, and the Europa League second qualifying round spot was passed to the seventh-placed team.)

Source: DFB
Rules for classification: 1) Points; 2) Goal difference; 3) Goals scored; 4) Head-to-head results; 5) Head-to-head away goals scored; 6) Away goals scored; 7) Play-off
(C) Champions

==== Results summary ====
Overall								Home						Away					
Pld	W	D	L	GF	GA	GD	Pts	W	D	L	GF	GA	GD	W	D	L	GF	GA	GD
34	19	9	6	63	29	+34	66	10	6	1	34	9	+25	9	3	5	29	20	+9

Last updated: 25 May 2019.
Source: Bundesliga

==== Results by round ====
Round	1	2	3	4	5	6	7	8	9	10	11	12	13	14	15	16	17	18	19	20	21	22	23	24	25	26	27	28	29	30	31	32	33	34
Ground	A	H	H	A	H	A	H	A	H	A	H	A	H	A	H	A	H	H	A	A	H	A	H	A	H	A	H	A	H	A	H	A	H	A
Result	L	D	W	D	W	W	W	D	D	W	W	L	W	L	W	L	W	L	W	W	D	W	D	W	D	W	W	W	W	W	W	D	D	L
Position	18	14	10	10	8	6	2	5	5	4	3	4	3	4	4	4	4	4	4	4	4	4	4	3	3	3	3	3	3	3	3	3	3	3

Updated to match(es) played on 25 May 2019. Source: DFB
A = Away; H = Home; W = Win; D = Draw; L = Loss

==== Matches ====
26 August 2018 1	Borussia Dortmund	4–1	RB Leipzig	Dortmund
18:00 CEST (UTC+2)	Dahoud 21'; Sabitzer 40' (o.g.); Witsel 43'; Reus 90+1'	Report	Augustin 1'	Stadium: Signal Iduna Park; Attendance: 80,365; Referee: Deniz Aytekin

2 September 2018 2	RB Leipzig	1–1	Fortuna Düsseldorf	Leipzig
15:30 CEST (UTC+2)	Augustin 68'	Report	Zimmermann 47'	Stadium: Red Bull Arena; Attendance: 34,975; Referee: Marco Fritz

15 September 2018 3	RB Leipzig	3–2	Hannover 96	Leipzig
15:30 CEST (UTC+2)	Poulsen 9'; Werner 40', 63'	Report	Füllkrug 13'; Albornoz 65'	Stadium: Red Bull Arena; Attendance: 38,937; Referee: Robert Kampka

23 September 2018 4	Eintracht Frankfurt	1–1	RB Leipzig	Frankfurt
18:00 CEST (UTC+2)	Fernandes 26'	Report	Forsberg 53' (pen.)	Stadium: Commerzbank-Arena; Attendance: 43,800; Referee: Felix Brych

26 September 2018 5	RB Leipzig	2–0	VfB Stuttgart	Leipzig
20:30 CEST (UTC+2)	Orbán 45+1'; Augustin 80'	Report		Stadium: Red Bull Arena; Attendance: 32,187; Referee: Robert Schröder

29 September 2018 6	1899 Hoffenheim	1–2	RB Leipzig	Sinsheim
15:30 CEST (UTC+2)	Kramarić 90+3' (pen.)	Report	Poulsen 53', 73'	Stadium: Wirsol Rhein-Neckar-Arena; Attendance: 28,115; Referee: Deniz Aytekin

7 October 2018 7	RB Leipzig	6–0	1. FC Nürnberg	Leipzig
18:00 CEST (UTC+2)	Kampl 3'; Poulsen 7'; Sabitzer 21', 55'; Werner 32', 59'	Report		Stadium: Red Bull Arena; Attendance: 37,389; Referee: Tobias Stieler

20 October 2018 8	FC Augsburg	0–0	RB Leipzig	Augsburg
15:30 CEST (UTC+2)		Report		Stadium: WWK Arena; Attendance: 28,703; Referee: Tobias Welz

28 October 2018 9	RB Leipzig	0–0	Schalke 04	Leipzig
15:30 CET (UTC+1)		Report		Stadium: Red Bull Arena; Attendance: 41,939; Referee: Felix Brych

3 November 2018 10	Hertha BSC	0–3	RB Leipzig	Berlin
18:30 CET (UTC+1)		Report	Werner 7', 53'; Cunha 75'	Stadium: Olympiastadion Berlin; Attendance: 50,382; Referee: Deniz Aytekin

11 November 2018 11	RB Leipzig	3–0	Bayer Leverkusen	Leipzig
15:30 CET (UTC+1)	Poulsen 27', 85'; Klostermann 68'	Report		Stadium: Red Bull Arena; Attendance: 36,155; Referee: Martin Petersen

24 November 2018 12	VfL Wolfsburg	1–0	RB Leipzig	Wolfsburg
15:30 CET (UTC+1)	Roussillon 50'	Report		Stadium: Volkswagen Arena; Attendance: 22,832; Referee: Tobias Stieler

2 December 2018 13	RB Leipzig	2–0	Borussia Mönchengladbach	Leipzig
15:30 CET (UTC+1)	Werner 3', 45+1'	Report		Stadium: Red Bull Arena; Attendance: 41,939; Referee: Markus Schmidt

8 December 2018 14	SC Freiburg	3–0	RB Leipzig	Freiburg
15:30 CET (UTC+1)	Petersen 12'; Waldschmidt 45+1' (pen.); Frantz 52'	Report		Stadium: Schwarzwald-Stadion; Attendance: 23,800; Referee: Tobias Welz

16 December 2018 15	RB Leipzig	4–1	Mainz 05	Leipzig
15:30 CET (UTC+1)	Poulsen 14', 19'; Werner 74', 88'	Report	Onisiwo 38'	Stadium: Red Bull Arena; Attendance: 30,136; Referee: Martin Petersen

19 December 2018 16	Bayern Munich	1–0	RB Leipzig	Munich
20:30 CET (UTC+1)	Ribéry 83'	Report		Stadium: Allianz Arena; Attendance: 75,000; Referee: Marco Fritz

22 December 2018 17	RB Leipzig	3–2	Werder Bremen	Leipzig
15:30 CET (UTC+1)	Klostermann 22'; Werner 44'; Bruma 87'	Report	Kruse 67'; Sargent 77'	Stadium: Red Bull Arena; Attendance: 40,455; Referee: Bibiana Steinhaus

19 January 2019 18	RB Leipzig	0–1	Borussia Dortmund	Leipzig
18:30 CET (UTC+1)		Report	Witsel 19'	Stadium: Red Bull Arena; Attendance: 41,939; Referee: Deniz Aytekin

27 January 2019 19	Fortuna Düsseldorf	0–4	RB Leipzig	Düsseldorf
18:00 CET (UTC+1)		Report	Poulsen 2', 16'; Konaté 9'; Laimer 68'	Stadium: Merkur Spiel-Arena; Attendance: 34,394; Referee: Robert Hartmann

1 February 2019 20	Hannover 96	0–3	RB Leipzig	Hanover
20:30 CET (UTC+1)		Report	Halstenberg 45+3' (pen.); Orbán 64', 85'	Stadium: HDI-Arena; Attendance: 32,400; Referee: Daniel Schlager

9 February 2019 21	RB Leipzig	0–0	Eintracht Frankfurt	Leipzig
15:30 CET (UTC+1)		Report		Stadium: Red Bull Arena; Attendance: 38,330; Referee: Guido Winkmann

16 February 2019 22	VfB Stuttgart	1–3	RB Leipzig	Stuttgart
15:30 CET (UTC+1)	Zuber 16' (pen.)	Report	Poulsen 6', 74'; Sabitzer 68'	Stadium: Mercedes-Benz Arena; Attendance: 46,072; Referee: Felix Zwayer

25 February 2019 23	RB Leipzig	1–1	1899 Hoffenheim	Leipzig
20:30 CET (UTC+1)	Orbán 89'	Report	Kramarić 22'	Stadium: Red Bull Arena; Attendance: 33,569; Referee: Felix Brych

2 March 2019 24	1. FC Nürnberg	0–1	RB Leipzig	Nuremberg
15:30 CET (UTC+1)		Report	Klostermann 40'	Stadium: Max-Morlock-Stadion; Attendance: 34,532; Referee: Daniel Schlager

9 March 2019 25	RB Leipzig	0–0	FC Augsburg	Leipzig
15:30 CET (UTC+1)		Report		Stadium: Red Bull Arena; Attendance: 38,590; Referee: Sven Jablonski

16 March 2019 26	Schalke 04	0–1	RB Leipzig	Gelsenkirchen
15:30 CET (UTC+1)		Report	Werner 14'	Stadium: Veltins-Arena; Attendance: 59,913; Referee: Guido Winkmann

30 March 2019 27	RB Leipzig	5–0	Hertha BSC	Leipzig
18:30 CET (UTC+1)	Forsberg 17'; Poulsen 27', 56', 62'; Haidara 64'	Report		Stadium: Red Bull Arena; Attendance: 41,939; Referee: Sören Storks

6 April 2019 28	Bayer Leverkusen	2–4	RB Leipzig	Leverkusen
15:30 CEST (UTC+2)	Havertz 11' (pen.), 23'	Report	Sabitzer 17'; Werner 64'; Forsberg 71' (pen.); Cunha 83'	Stadium: BayArena; Attendance: 28,845; Referee: Tobias Welz

13 April 2019 29	RB Leipzig	2–0	VfL Wolfsburg	Leipzig
15:30 CEST (UTC+2)	Kampl 16'; Werner 28'	Report		Stadium: Red Bull Arena; Attendance: 41,212; Referee: Daniel Siebert

20 April 2019 30	Borussia Mönchengladbach	1–2	RB Leipzig	Mönchengladbach
18:30 CEST (UTC+2)	Pléa 61'	Report	Halstenberg 17' (pen.), 53'	Stadium: Borussia-Park; Attendance: 51,757; Referee: Harm Osmers

27 April 2019 31	RB Leipzig	2–1	SC Freiburg	Leipzig
15:30 CEST (UTC+2)	Werner 19'; Forsberg 78' (pen.)	Report	Grifo 66'	Stadium: Red Bull Arena; Attendance: 40,826; Referee: Robert Schröder

3 May 2019 32	Mainz 05	3–3	RB Leipzig	Mainz
20:30 CEST (UTC+2)	Onisiwo 43'; Niakhaté 67'; Mateta 83'	Report	Klostermann 20', 32'; Werner 49'	Stadium: Opel Arena; Attendance: 23,805; Referee: Bibiana Steinhaus

11 May 2019 33	RB Leipzig	0–0	Bayern Munich	Leipzig
15:30 CEST (UTC+2)		Report		Stadium: Red Bull Arena; Attendance: 41,939; Referee: Manuel Gräfe

18 May 2019 34	Werder Bremen	2–1	RB Leipzig	Bremen
15:30 CEST (UTC+2)	Rashica 35'; Pizarro 89'	Report	Mukiele 86'	Stadium: Weser-Stadion; Attendance: 42,100; Referee: Felix Brych

=== DFB-Pokal ===
19 August 2018 First round	Viktoria Köln	1–3	RB Leipzig	Cologne
15:30 CEST (UTC+2)	Golley 39'	Report	Poulsen 60'; Forsberg 69'; Augustin 90+3'	Stadium: Sportpark Höhenberg; Attendance: 6,000; Referee: Martin Petersen

31 October 2018 Second round	RB Leipzig	2–0	1899 Hoffenheim	Leipzig
20:45 CET (UTC+1)	Werner 48', 56'	Report		Stadium: Red Bull Arena; Attendance: 21,042; Referee: Marco Fritz

6 February 2019 Round of 16	RB Leipzig	1–0	VfL Wolfsburg	Leipzig
18:30 CET (UTC+1)	Cunha 9'	Report		Stadium: Red Bull Arena; Attendance: 21,135; Referee: Christian Dingert

2 April 2019 Quarter-finals	FC Augsburg	1–2 (a.e.t.)	RB Leipzig	Augsburg
20:45 CEST (UTC+2)	Finnbogason 90+4'	Report	Werner 74'; Halstenberg 120+1' (pen.)	Stadium: WWK Arena; Attendance: 25,263; Referee: Tobias Stieler

23 April 2019 Semi-finals	Hamburger SV	1–3	RB Leipzig	Hamburg
20:45 CEST (UTC+2)	Jatta 24'	Report	Poulsen 12'; Janjičić 53' (o.g.); Forsberg 72'	Stadium: Volksparkstadion; Attendance: 52,365; Referee: Felix Brych

25 May 2019 Final	RB Leipzig	0–3	Bayern Munich	Berlin
20:00 CEST (UTC+2)		Report	Lewandowski 29', 85'; Coman 78'	Stadium: Olympiastadion Berlin; Attendance: 74,322; Referee: Tobias Stieler

=== UEFA Europa League ===
==== Second qualifying round ====
26 July 2018 First leg	RB Leipzig (Germany)	4–0	(Sweden) BK Häcken	Leipzig, Germany
18:30 CEST (UTC+2)	Bruma 35'; Cunha 39'; Kampl 50'; Augustin 84'	Report		Stadium: Red Bull Arena; Attendance: 18,126; Referee: Aleksandar Stavrev (Macedonia)

2 August 2018 Second leg	BK Häcken (Sweden)	1–1 (1–5 agg.)	(Germany) RB Leipzig	Gothenburg, Sweden
18:30 CEST (UTC+2)	Irandust 85'	Report	Bruno 47'	Stadium: Bravida Arena; Attendance: 2,968; Referee: Mete Kalkavan (Turkey)

==== Third qualifying round ====
9 August 2018 First leg	RB Leipzig (Germany)	3–1	(Romania) Universitatea Craiova	Leipzig, Germany
18:30 CEST (UTC+2)	Konaté 25'; Cunha 77'; Poulsen 87'	Report	Martić 90+3'	Stadium: Red Bull Arena; Attendance: 16,648; Referee: Paweł Gil (Poland)

16 August 2018 Second leg	Universitatea Craiova (Romania)	1–1 (2–4 agg.)	(Germany) RB Leipzig	Craiova, Romania
19:30 EEST (UTC+3); 18:30 CEST (UTC+2)	Baicu 85'	Report	Sabitzer 39'	Stadium: Stadionul Ion Oblemenco; Attendance: 12,050; Referee: Miroslav Zelinka (Czech Republic)

==== Play-off round ====
23 August 2018 First leg	Zorya Luhansk (Ukraine)	0–0	(Germany) RB Leipzig	Zaporizhia, Ukraine
21:30 EEST (UTC+3); 20:30 CEST (UTC+2)		Report		Stadium: Slavutych-Arena; Attendance: 5,127; Referee: Benoît Bastien (France)

30 August 2018 Second leg	RB Leipzig (Germany)	3–2 (3–2 agg.)	(Ukraine) Zorya Luhansk	Leipzig, Germany
18:30 CEST (UTC+2)	Cunha 7'; Augustin 69'; Forsberg 90' (pen.)	Report	Rafael Ratão 35'; Hordiyenko 48'	Stadium: Red Bull Arena; Attendance: 17,644; Referee: Danny Makkelie (Netherlands)

==== Group stage ====
Pos	Team	Pld	W	D	L	GF	GA	GD	Pts	Qualification
1	(Austria) Red Bull Salzburg	6	6	0	0	17	6	+11	18	Advance to knockout phase
2	(Scotland) Celtic	6	3	0	3	6	8	−2	9	Advance to knockout phase
3	(Germany) RB Leipzig	6	2	1	3	9	8	+1	7	
4	(Norway) Rosenborg	6	0	1	5	4	14	−10	1	

Source: UEFA
Rules for classification: Group stage tiebreakers

20 September 2018 1	RB Leipzig (Germany)	2–3	(Austria) Red Bull Salzburg	Leipzig, Germany
21:00 CEST (UTC+2)	Laimer 70'; Poulsen 82'	Report	Dabbur 20'; Haidara 22'; Gulbrandsen 89'	Stadium: Red Bull Arena; Attendance: 24,057; Referee: Andreas Ekberg (Sweden)

4 October 2018 2	Rosenborg (Norway)	1–3	(Germany) RB Leipzig	Trondheim, Norway
18:55 CEST (UTC+2)	Jebali 79'	Report	Augustin 12'; Konaté 54'; Cunha 61'	Stadium: Lerkendal Stadion; Attendance: 11,484; Referee: Marco Guidone (Italy)

25 October 2018 3	RB Leipzig (Germany)	2–0	(Scotland) Celtic	Leipzig, Germany
18:55 CEST (UTC+2)	Cunha 31'; Bruma 35'	Report		Stadium: Red Bull Arena; Attendance: 38,126; Referee: Pavel Královec (Czech Republic)

8 November 2018 4	Celtic (Scotland)	2–1	(Germany) RB Leipzig	Glasgow, Scotland
20:00 GMT (UTC±0); 21:00 CET (UTC+1)	Tierney 11'; Édouard 79'	Report	Augustin 78'	Stadium: Celtic Park; Attendance: 56,027; Referee: Xavier Estrada Fernández (Spain)

29 November 2018 5	Red Bull Salzburg (Austria)	1–0	(Germany) RB Leipzig	Salzburg, Austria
18:55 CET (UTC+1)	Gulbrandsen 74'	Report		Stadium: Red Bull Arena; Attendance: 29,520; Referee: Orel Grinfeld (Israel)

13 December 2018 6	RB Leipzig (Germany)	1–1	(Norway) Rosenborg	Leipzig, Germany
21:00 CET (UTC+1)	Cunha 47'	Report	Reginiussen 86'	Stadium: Red Bull Arena; Attendance: 16,957; Referee: Serhiy Boyko (Ukraine)

== Statistics ==
=== Appearances and goals ===
No.	Pos	Nat	Player	Total		Bundesliga		DFB-Pokal		Europa League	
No.	Pos	Nat	Player	Apps	Goals	Apps	Goals	Apps	Goals	Apps	Goals
Goalkeepers
1	GK	(Hungary) HUN	Péter Gulácsi	40	0	33	0	6	0	1	0
21	GK	(Germany) GER	Marius Müller	1	0	0	0	0	0	1	0
28	GK	(Switzerland) SUI	Yvon Mvogo	12	0	1+1	0	0	0	10	0
32	GK	(Germany) GER	Julian Krahl	0	0	0	0	0	0	0	0
Defenders
3	DF	(Uruguay) URU	Marcelo Saracchi	20	0	7+2	0	0+1	0	9+1	0
4	DF	(Hungary) HUN	Willi Orbán	39	4	23+1	4	4	0	11	0
5	DF	(France) FRA	Dayot Upamecano	22	0	14+1	0	2+1	0	4	0
6	DF	(France) FRA	Ibrahima Konaté	42	3	26+1	1	5+1	0	9	2
16	DF	(Germany) GER	Lukas Klostermann	40	5	22+4	5	5	0	5+4	0
22	DF	(France) FRA	Nordi Mukiele	31	1	14+5	1	1+3	0	7+1	0
23	DF	(Germany) GER	Marcel Halstenberg	37	4	27+1	3	5	1	1+3	0
33	DF	(Turkey) TUR	Atınç Nukan	0	0	0	0	0	0	0	0
Midfielders
7	MF	(Austria) AUT	Marcel Sabitzer	43	5	26+4	4	5	0	5+3	1
8	MF	(Mali) MLI	Amadou Haidara	12	1	4+5	1	0+3	0	0	0
13	MF	(Austria) AUT	Stefan Ilsanker	34	0	10+9	0	2+2	0	9+2	0
14	MF	(United States) USA	Tyler Adams	12	0	8+2	0	2	0	0	0
18	MF	(England) ENG	Emile Smith Rowe	3	0	0+3	0	0	0	0	0
26	MF	(Germany) GER	Niclas Stierlin	2	0	0	0	0	0	1+1	0
27	MF	(Austria) AUT	Konrad Laimer	43	2	20+9	1	4+2	0	8	1
31	MF	(Germany) GER	Diego Demme	39	0	24+2	0	4+1	0	6+2	0
40	MF	(Germany) GER	Erik Majetschak	2	0	0	0	0	0	0+2	0
41	MF	(Germany) GER	Oliver Bias	1	0	0	0	0	0	0+1	0
44	MF	(Slovenia) SVN	Kevin Kampl	40	3	25+2	2	4+1	0	7+1	1
Forwards
9	FW	(Denmark) DEN	Yussuf Poulsen	45	19	27+4	15	6	2	2+6	2
10	FW	(Sweden) SWE	Emil Forsberg	29	7	14+6	4	3+1	2	2+3	1
11	FW	(Germany) GER	Timo Werner	37	19	29+1	16	3+1	3	3	0
17	FW	(Portugal) POR	Bruma	27	3	6+8	1	2	0	9+2	2
20	FW	(Brazil) BRA	Matheus Cunha	39	9	9+16	2	1+1	1	12	6
29	FW	(France) FRA	Jean-Kévin Augustin	30	8	4+13	3	2	1	9+2	4
38	FW	(Germany) GER	Lukas Krüger	1	0	0	0	0	0	0+1	0
39	FW	(Germany) GER	Fabrice Hartmann	1	0	0	0	0	0	0+1	0
Players transferred out during the season
35	MF	(Belgium) BEL	Massimo Bruno	1	1	0	0	0	0	1	1

Last updated: 25 May 2019
Source: Competitions
