= Jean-Kévin Augustin =

French footballer (born 1997)

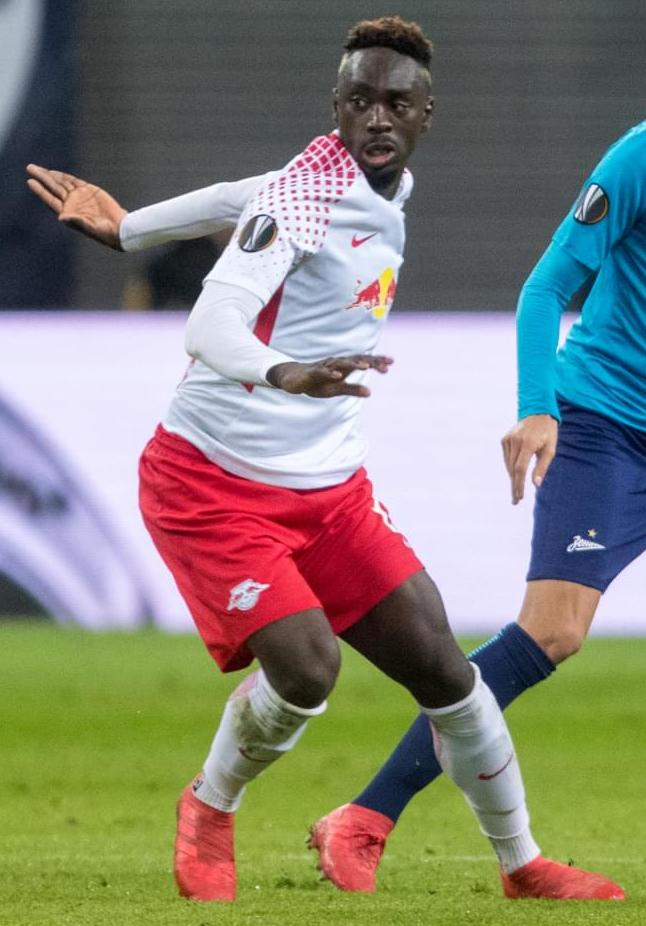
- Augustin with RB Leipzig in 2018

Personal information
- Full name: Jean-Kévin Augustin
- Date of birth: 16 June 1997 (age 29)
- Place of birth: Paris, France
- Height: 1.77 m (5 ft 10 in)
- Position: Striker

Team information
- Current team: Yverdon-Sport
- Number: 17

Youth career
- 2004–2006: FO Plaisir
- 2006–2009: AC Boulogne-Billancourt
- 2009–2015: Paris Saint-Germain

Senior career*
Years	Team	Apps	(Gls)
2014–2017	Paris Saint-Germain B	38	(22)
2015–2017	Paris Saint-Germain	23	(2)
2017–2020	RB Leipzig	42	(12)
2019–2020	→ Monaco (loan)	10	(0)
2020	→ Leeds United (loan)	3	(0)
2020–2022	Nantes	10	(0)
2021–2022	Nantes B	4	(0)
2022–2024	Basel	38	(5)
2025	Motor Lublin	4	(1)
2026–	Yverdon-Sport	8	(1)

International career
2012–2013	France U16	7	(2)
2013	France U17	2	(0)
2014–2015	France U18	4	(0)
2015–2016	France U19	13	(12)
2017	France U20	6	(5)
2016–2018	France U21	9	(5)
- * Club domestic league appearances and goals as of 20 September 2026

Jean-Kévin Augustin (born 16 June 1997) is a French professional footballer who plays as a striker for Swiss Challenge League club Yverdon-Sport.

An academy graduate of French club Paris Saint-Germain, Augustin made his senior debut in 2015 and made 31 appearances for the club, scoring two goals, and won eight national honours. In 2017, he joined RB Leipzig for a €13 million fee.

Augustin has also represented France at various youth levels and was part of the France U19 which won the 2016 European U19 Championship. His performances throughout the tournament earned him the Golden Boot and Player of the Tournament awards.

== Club career ==
=== Paris Saint-Germain ===
Augustin was first called up for a professional match for Paris Saint-Germain on 5 October 2014, remaining unused in a 1–1 home draw with Monaco. He made his professional debut on 8 April 2015 in the 2014–15 Coupe de France semi-finals against Saint-Étienne at the Parc des Princes, replacing Javier Pastore after 88 minutes in a 4–1 home win.

He played in PSG's 2–0 victory over Lyon on 1 August in the 2015 Trophée des Champions at the Stade Saputo in Montreal, replacing Edinson Cavani after 63 minutes. Six days later he made his Ligue 1 debut, replacing Lucas Moura for the final minute of a 1–0 win at Lille. On 16 August, he was given a first start, in a 2–0 win over Gazélec Ajaccio at the Parc des Princes. In all competitions, Augustin made 17 appearances across the season, scoring once in a 4–1 home win over Troyes four minutes after coming on for Edinson Cavani on 28 November.

On 19 November 2016, Augustin made his first start of the season, providing the assist for Ángel Di María in the 13th minute in a 2–0 Ligue 1 home win against Nantes. He made 13 official appearances over the campaign, and scored the last goal of a 6–0 win at Caen on 16 September. At PSG, Augustin scored two goals in 23 league games and was mainly used as back up to main Strikers Zlatan Ibrahimovic and Edinson Cavani.

=== RB Leipzig ===
On 6 July 2017, RB Leipzig completed the €13 million signing of Augustin on a five-year deal. He made his Bundesliga debut on 19 August, replacing Konrad Laimer for the final 14 minutes of a 2–0 loss at Schalke. On 16 September, he scored his first goal for his new team, in a 2–2 draw with Borussia Mönchengladbach at the Red Bull Arena.

Augustin scored a match-winning penalty away to Borussia Dortmund on 14 October, becoming the first team of the season to win at the Westfalenstadion. Three days later, he scored his first Champions League goal in a 3–2 home win over Porto in the group stage, Leipzig's first win in the competition. He scored against Borussia Dortmund on 3 March 2018 to help earn Leipzig a 1–1 draw. On 12 April 2018, Augustin scored in the Europa League quarter final defeat to Marseille in a 5–2 defeat, which saw Leipzig eliminated 5–3 on aggregate.

He scored 12 goals in all competitions and gained 6 assists in 37 appearances during the 2017–18 RB Leipzig season, with Augustin competing with the likes of Timo Werner and Yussuf Poulsen for starting places.

In September 2018, Augustin was disciplined by the club for using his mobile phone in the pre-match build up against RB Salzburg in a 3–2 defeat in the Europa League. In November 2018, he scored in the Europa League in a 2–1 defeat against Celtic. He was linked with a £37 million transfer to Premier League side Everton in December 2018, however remained at Leipzig. He scored 8 goals in 30 appearances during the 2018–19 RB Leipzig season helping RB Leipzig finish 3rd in Bundesliga under Head Coach Ralf Rangnick.

==== Loan to Monaco ====
On 1 September 2019, Augustin joined Monaco on a season-long loan deal including an optional buyout clause. He made his debut for the club on 15 September in a 3–4 loss against Marseille in Ligue 1.

He scored his first goal for the club on 30 October 2019, scoring a powerful right footed volley against Marseille in a 2–1 victory in the Coupe de la Ligue. However, Augustin found himself competing for limited striking places with Wissam Ben Yedder, Islam Slimani, Stevan Jovetić and Keita Baldé. On 27 January 2020, RB Leipzig and Augustin agreed to cut his loan spell at Monaco short in order to secure his move to Leeds United on the same day.

==== Loan to Leeds United ====
On 27 January 2020, Augustin joined EFL Championship side Leeds United on loan until the end of the season, with the club reportedly having the option to sign him permanently for £17.7 million. Augustin revealed that working with Leeds' head coach Marcelo Bielsa was a big factor in his decision to sign for the club. Augustin made his debut for Leeds on 8 February 2020, coming on as a 71st minute substitute for Patrick Bamford in a 2–0 defeat to Nottingham Forest. After three substitute appearances for Leeds, each one replacing Bamford with 15–20 minutes to play, Augustin suffered a muscular injury in late February, which ruled him out for the next three games. He eventually left Leeds at the end of his loan deal, having only played 48 minutes of football for Leeds. Ex-Leeds striker Jermaine Beckford revealed that the lack of playing time, and the reason for not extending the loan deal in light of the delayed season end, was down to Augustin not following instructions from management, and not putting in the required work.

It was later reported that Leeds had the obligation to complete a permanent transfer of Augustin due to a clause on Leeds achieving promotion to the Premier League at the end of the 2019-20 season, however Leeds claimed "extenuating circumstances" surrounding the COVID-19 pandemic "nullify the deal". RB Leipzig threatened legal action over failure to complete the deal, claiming "the legal situation is clear". Leeds boss Marcelo Bielsa however was quoted as saying it was "convenient" for Augustin to return to RB Leipzig. The disagreement lay with the date specified in the contract which stated that should Leeds have been promoted by 30 June, the clause would have been legally activated, however with Leeds still having six games to play by this date, Augustin's loan period ended and he was released by the club, with Leeds securing promotion on 17 July. Leipzig however argued that under the "spirit of the rules", the transfer should have taken place, as football contracts specify 30 June as the "end of a season", thus the circumstances surrounding the COVID-19 pandemic should be taken into account. FIFA confirmed on 8 December 2020 that Leipzig had officially filed a claim against Leeds over the aborted transfer. On 8 June 2021, a FIFA court sided with Leipzig and against Leeds, however Leeds appealed this decision to the Court of Arbitration for Sport providing details on communications between the clubs showing that they had tried to extend the loan deal, which included the dates for the transfer to become a requirement, but an agreement with Leipzig couldn't be reached.

On 4 November 2022, Court of Arbitration for Sport dismissed Leeds' appeal upholding FIFA's decision "in its entirety" and ordered Leeds to pay Leipzig a fee of €21m (£18.4m). However, Leeds released a statement confirming that they would review their "legal options with a view to an immediate appeal." On 5 December, Leeds released a statement confirming an "amicable resolution of the dispute".

On 10 April 2023, The Athletic reported that Leeds were ordered to pay Augustin £24.5m (€27.9m) in compensation for breach of contract by FIFA’s Dispute Resolution Chamber, but appealed the decision.

=== Nantes ===
On 6 October 2020, Nantes announced the signing of Augustin on a two-year deal, being signed as a free-agent, with both RB Leipzig and Leeds providing written permission, and relinquishing any claim to Augustin's registration. On 4 March 2021, Nantes announced that Augustin was suffering from Long COVID.

=== Basel ===
On 18 June 2022, it was announced that Augustin would join FC Basel on a free transfer with a three-year deal. He joined Basel's first team for their 2022–23 season under head coach Alexander Frei. After playing in one test game, Augustin played his domestic league debut for his new club in the away game in the Letzigrund on 28 August as Basel won 4–2 against Zürich. He scored his first two goals for Basel in a 5–1 home win over Grasshopper Club at St. Jakob-Park on 11 September. In the 2022–23 Super League, Basel were not very successful, ending in just fifth position in the table. However, they rescued the season with their performances in that season's Europa Conference League; in the knockout phase, they reached the semi-finals, where they were knocked out by ACF Fiorentina 4–3 on aggregate. Augustin made 20 appearances in the league, scoring five goals and nine appearances in the Conference League, scoring twice.

Basel did not start the 2023–24 league campaign well, and Augustin was used mainly as a substitute. In November 2024, the club announced that he had incurred an injury, tearing a muscle bundle in his right thigh during a match against Yverdon on 5 November 2023. Augustin felt slight pain during the game and was subsequently substituted out in the 56th minute. Due to the injury, Augustin was out for several weeks. He made his last appearance of the season on 2 April 2024, when he started in a 0–2 away loss to FC Lugano. He was subsequently left out of the matchday squad for the remainder of the season, as well as at the start of the 2024–25 season. With the signing of Xherdan Shaqiri to Basel on 16 August 2024, he also lost shirt number 10 to the returnee. On 31 August 2024, following weeks of being excluded from team training, his contract with Basel was dissolved by mutual consent.

=== Motor Lublin ===
On 21 March 2025, Augustin joined Ekstraklasa side Motor Lublin on a three-month deal, with an option for a further year. On 14 April, he made his debut as a substitute in a 1–2 loss to Lech Poznań. Augustin scored his first goal in his first start on 9 May 2025, opening the scoring in a 1–4 loss to Piast Gliwice. Five days later, during a match against Pogoń Szczecin, Augustin suffered an injury which would sideline him for several months; as a result, he was released by Motor at the end of his contract in June.

=== Yverdon-Sport ===
On 7 July 2026, Augustin joined Swiss Challenge League club Yverdon-Sport, signing a one-year contract.

== International career ==
Augustin is eligible for selection in both the France and Haiti national football teams. He played for the France under-19s in qualification for the 2016 UEFA European Under-19 Championship. There he scored five goals in six games, including a first-half hat-trick in a 9–0 win over Gibraltar in Dax on 9 October 2015.

He was the top scorer with six goals and Player of the Tournament at the finals in Germany in July 2016. He scored in all three group matches, including a hat-trick in a 5–1 win over the Netherlands. In the final at the Rhein-Neckar-Arena, he opened a 4–0 win over Italy. He finished top scorer for France in the tournament ahead of strike partner Kylian Mbappe.

Augustin was chosen for the under-20 team at the 2017 FIFA U-20 World Cup in South Korea. He scored four goals in as many games, including a penalty in the 2–1 quarter-final elimination by Italy on 1 June. In a group game against Vietnam, he scored twice in a 4–0 victory after missing a penalty by attempting a Panenka.

In September 2018, France national under-21 football team Head Coach Sylvain Ripoll proclaimed that Augustin rejected a call up to the under-21 team due to muscle fatigue, the dispute with the Head Coach led to his 'non selection' for the national team, Augustin revealed in December 2019 that he had spoken to Ripoll and was available for selection for the national team and was hoping to make the France national football team for the 2020 Summer Olympics.

== Style of play ==
Augustin plays as a striker capable of playing anywhere across the forward line, with Bundesliga describing Augustin as 'powerful, quick, direct and capable of making things happen outside, as well as inside, the box.'

His former RB Leipzig Head Coach Ralph Hasenhüttl said of Augustin, 'He's the full package. He's going to be a really important player'. in 2016, Augustin was listed by Barcelona forward Lionel Messi as a wonderkid in a list of his top 9 future prospects in football.

== Personal life ==
Augustin is of Afro-Haitian descent.

== Career statistics ==
As of match played 14 May 2025

Appearances and goals by club, season and competition
Club	Season	League			National cup (Note: Includes Coupe de France, DFB-Pokal, Swiss Cup)		League cup (Note: Includes Coupe de la Ligue)		Continental		Other		Total	
Club	Season	Division	Apps	Goals	Apps	Goals	Apps	Goals	Apps	Goals	Apps	Goals	Apps	Goals
Paris Saint-Germain	2014–15	Ligue 1	0	0	1	0	0	0	—		—		1	0
Paris Saint-Germain	2015–16	Ligue 1	13	1	1	0	1	0	1 (Note: Appearance in UEFA Champions League)	0	1 (Note: Appearance in Trophée des Champions)	0	17	1
Paris Saint-Germain	2016–17	Ligue 1	10	1	1	0	1	0	1	0	0	0	13	1
Paris Saint-Germain	Total		23	2	3	0	2	0	2	0	1	0	31	2
Paris Saint-Germain B	2014–15	Championnat de France Amateur	18	6	0	0	0	0	—		—		18	6
Paris Saint-Germain B	2015–16	Championnat de France Amateur	8	6	0	0	0	0	—		—		8	6
Paris Saint-Germain B	2016–17	Championnat de France Amateur	12	10	0	0	0	0	—		—		12	10
Paris Saint-Germain B	Total		38	22	0	0	0	0	0	0	0	0	38	22
RB Leipzig	2017–18	Bundesliga	25	9	1	0	—		11 (Note: Five appearances and one goal in UEFA Champions League, six appearances and two goals in UEFA Europa League)	3	—		37	12
RB Leipzig	2018–19	Bundesliga	17	3	2	1	—		11 (Note: Appearances in UEFA Europa League)	4	—		30	8
RB Leipzig	Total		42	12	3	1	—		22	7	—		67	20
Monaco (loan)	2019–20	Ligue 1	10	0	1	0	2	1	—		—		13	1
Leeds United (loan)	2019–20	Championship	3	0	0	0	0	0	—		—		3	0
Nantes	2020–21	Ligue 1	3	0	0	0	—		—		—		3	0
Nantes	2021–22	Ligue 1	7	0	1	0	—		—		—		8	0
Nantes	Total		10	0	1	0	—		—		—		11	0
Nantes B	2021–22	Championnat National 2	4	0	0	0	—		0	0	—		4	0
FC Basel	2022–23	Swiss Super League	20	3	2	1	—		7 (Note: Appearances in UEFA Europa Conference League)	1	—		29	5
FC Basel	2023–24	Swiss Super League	18	2	2	0	—		2	1	—		22	3
FC Basel	Total		38	5	4	1	—		9	2	—		51	8
Motor Lublin	2024–25	Ekstraklasa	4	1	—		—		—		—		4	1
Career total			172	42	12	2	4	1	33	9	1	0	222	54

== Honours ==
Paris Saint-Germain

- Ligue 1: 2015–16
- Coupe de France: 2014–15, 2015–16, 2016–17
- Coupe de la Ligue: 2015–16, 2016–17
- Trophée des Champions: 2015, 2016

Nantes

- Coupe de France: 2021–22

France U19

- UEFA European Under-19 Championship: 2016

Individual

- UEFA European Under-19 Championship Team of the Tournament: 2016
- UEFA European Under-19 Football Championship Golden Player: 2016
- UEFA European Under-19 Football Championship Top goalscorer: 2016
- FIFA U-20 World Cup Bronze Boot: 2017
