= Felix Beiersdorf =

German footballer

Personal information
- Date of birth: 1 August 1998 (age 28)
- Place of birth: Leipzig, Germany
- Height: 1.82 m (6 ft 0 in)
- Position: Midfielder

Youth career
- 2004–2009: Sachsen Leipzig
- 2009–2016: RB Leipzig

Senior career*
Years	Team	Apps	(Gls)
2016–2017	RB Leipzig II	22	(2)
2017–2019	RB Leipzig	0	(0)
2017	→ Wiener Neustadt (loan)	2	(0)
2018	→ Chemie Leipzig (loan)	1	(0)
2018	→ ZFC Meuselwitz (loan)	1	(0)
2019–2022	Leipziger SV Südwest		
2022–	FC Grimma	63	(9)

International career^{‡}
2012–2013	Germany U15	3	(0)
2014	Germany U16	1	(0)
2015–2016	Germany U18	9	(2)
- * Club domestic league appearances and goals as of 01:29, 4 July 2024 (UTC) ‡ National team caps and goals as of 22:08, 17 September 2020 (UTC)

Felix Beiersdorf (born 1 August 1998) is a German footballer who most recently played as a midfielder for FC Grimma.

== Career ==
Beiersdorf made his professional debut for Wiener Neustadt in the Austrian First League on 29 September 2017, coming on as a substitute in the 84th minute for Fabian Miesenböck against TSV Hartberg, with the away match finishing as a 1–0 win.

Beiersdorf joined Leipziger SV Südwest in early 2019. He achieved promotion to the sixth-tier Landesliga with the club. Beiersdorf moved to FC Grimma of the fifth-tier Oberliga NOFV-Süd in January 2022.
