= 2025 San Jose Earthquakes season =

San Jose Earthquakes
2025 season
- Head coach: Bruce Arena
- Stadium: PayPal Park; San Jose, California
- MLS: Conference: 10th Overall: 20th
- MLS Cup playoffs: Did not qualify
- Leagues Cup: Did not qualify
- U.S. Open Cup: Quarterfinals
- Average home league attendance: 19,614
Home colours	Away colours	Third colours

The 2025 season was the San Jose Earthquakes' 43rd year of existence, their 28th season in Major League Soccer and their 18th consecutive season in the top-flight of American soccer.

== Roster ==
As of August 7, 2025

Note: Flags indicate national team as defined under FIFA eligibility rules; some limited exceptions apply. Players may hold more than one non-FIFA nationality.

No.	Pos.	Nation	Player
2	DF	USA	Jamar Ricketts
3	DF	FRA	Paul Marie
4	DF	POR	Bruno Wilson
5	DF	USA	Daniel Munie
6	MF	USA	Ian Harkes
7	FW	NOR	Amahl Pellegrino
9	FW	COL	Chicho Arango (DP)
10	FW	ARG	Cristian Espinoza (captain; DP)
11	FW	BFA	Ousseni Bouda
12	DF	USA	Dave Romney
14	MF	CAN	Mark-Anthony Kaye
15	MF	USA	Cruz Medina
16	MF	USA	Jack Skahan
17	FW	VEN	Josef Martínez
18	DF	USA	Reid Roberts
19	FW	USA	Preston Judd
20	MF	USA	Nick Fernandez

No.	Pos.	Nation	Player
21	MF	ENG	Noel Buck
22	DF	USA	DeJuan Jones
24	DF	USA	Nick Lima
25	DF	USA	Max Floriani
26	DF	BRA	Rodrigues
27	DF	USA	Wilson Eisner
28	FW	USA	Benji Kikanović
29	MF	USA	Kaedren Spivey
30	MF	USA	Niko Tsakiris
31	GK	USA	Francesco Montali
34	MF	USA	Beau Leroux
36	GK	USA	Earl Edwards Jr.
37	MF	GNB	Ronaldo Vieira
38	MF	USA	Edwyn Mendoza
42	GK	BRA	Daniel
44	FW	USA	Chance Cowell
94	DF	BRA	Vítor Costa
97	GK	USA	Luca Ulrich

== Transfers ==
=== In ===
No.	Pos.	Player	Previous club	Fee/notes	Date	Ref.
6	MF	(United States) Ian Harkes	(United States) New England Revolution	Trade	December 9, 2024	
14	MF	(Canada) Mark-Anthony Kaye	(United States) New England Revolution	Trade	December 9, 2024	
12	MF	(United States) Dave Romney	(United States) New England Revolution	Trade	December 9, 2024	
24	DF	(United States) Nick Lima	(United States) New England Revolution	Free	December 18, 2024	
25	DF	(United States) Max Floriani	(United States) Saint Louis Billikens	2025 MLS SuperDraft	December 20, 2024	
18	DF	(United States) Reid Roberts	(United States) University of San Francisco	2025 MLS SuperDraft	December 20, 2024	
20	MF	(United States) Nick Fernandez	(United States) University of Portland	2025 MLS SuperDraft	December 20, 2024	
36	GK	(United States) Earl Edwards Jr.	(United States) New England Revolution	Trade	December 30, 2024	
9	FW	(Colombia) Cristian Arango	(United States) Real Salt Lake	Trade	January 11, 2025	
17	FW	(Venezuela) Josef Martínez	(United States) CF Montréal	Free	January 13, 2025	
29	MF	(United States) Kaedren Spivey	(United States) San Jose Earthquakes Academy	Homegrown Player	January 17, 2025	
20	MF	(United States) Nick Fernandez	(United States) Portland Pilots	SuperDraft	February 21, 2025	
34	MF	(United States) Beau Leroux	(United States) The Town FC	Homegrown Player	February 21, 2025	
31	GK	(United States) Francesco Montali	(United States) Philadelphia Union	SuperDraft	February 21, 2025	
22	DF	(United States) DeJuan Jones	(United States) Columbus Crew	Trade	April 22, 2025	
21	MF	(England) Noel Buck	(United States) New England Revolution	Trade	April 23, 2025	

=== Out ===
No.	Pos.	Player	Transferred to	Fee/notes	Date	Ref.
98	GK	(United States) Jacob Jackson	(United States) San Diego FC	Re-Entry Draft Stage 1	December 13, 2024	
14	MF	(United States) Jackson Yueill	(United States) New England Revolution	Free	December 18, 2024	
15	DF	(United States) Tanner Beason	(United States) New England Revolution	Free	December 20, 2024	
11	MF	(United States) Jeremy Ebobisse	(United States) Los Angeles FC	Free agent	December 23, 2024	
12	GK	(United States) JT Marcinkowski	(United States) LA Galaxy	Free	January 16, 2025	
30	GK	(Mexico) Emi Ochoa	(Mexico) Cruz Azul	Transfer	January 17, 2025	
7	MF	(Ecuador) Carlos Gruezo	(Ecuador) L.D.U. Quito	Free	February 4, 2025	
27	MF	(United States) Alfredo Morales	(United States) St. Louis City SC	Free	February 21, 2025	
33	DF	(United States) Oscar Verhoeven	(United States) San Diego FC	Loan	April 21, 2025	

== Competitions ==
=== Friendlies ===
February 5 Coachella Valley Invitational	Portland Timbers	2–1	San Jose Earthquakes	Indio, California
12:30 p.m. PDT	Chará (yellow card) 33'; Župarić 44'; Johnston 48'	SJ report POR report	Ricketts (yellow card) 35'; Lima (yellow card) 68'; Bouda 72'	Stadium: Empire Polo Club

February 8 Coachella Valley Invitational	San Jose Earthquakes	0–1	New York Red Bulls	Indio, California
1:30 p.m. PDT	Harkes (yellow card) 54'; Munie (yellow card) 68'	Report	Hack 42'; Collahuazo (yellow card) 90'	Stadium: Empire Polo Club

February 12 Coachella Valley Invitational	San Jose Earthquakes	1–5	Chicago Fire FC	Indio, California
10:30 p.m. PDT	Wilson (yellow card) 27'; Arango 56'; Rodrigues (yellow card) 81'	Report	Bamba 5' (pen.), 34'; Gutiérrez 13', 26' (pen.); Zinckernagel 16'; Acosta (yellow card) 18'	Stadium: Empire Polo Club

=== Major League Soccer ===
==== Standings ====
MLS Western Conference table (2025)
Pos	Team	Pld	W	L	T	GF	GA	GD	Pts	Qualification
8	Portland Timbers	34	11	12	11	41	48	−7	44	Qualification for the wild-card round
9	Real Salt Lake	34	12	17	5	38	49	−11	41	Qualification for the wild-card round
10	San Jose Earthquakes	34	11	15	8	60	63	−3	41	
11	Colorado Rapids	34	11	15	8	44	56	−12	41	
12	Houston Dynamo FC	34	9	15	10	43	56	−13	37	

Source: MLS
Rules for classification: 1) points; 2) total wins; 3) total goal differential; 4) total goals scored; 5) fewer disciplinary points; 6) away goal differential; 7) away goals scored; 8) home goals differential; 9) home goals scored; 10) coin toss (2 clubs tied) or drawing of lots (≥3 clubs tied)

=== Overall table ===
Overall MLS standings table (2025)
Pos	Team	Pld	W	L	T	GF	GA	GD	Pts
18	New York Red Bulls	34	12	15	7	48	47	+1	43
19	Real Salt Lake	34	12	17	5	38	49	−11	41
20	San Jose Earthquakes	34	11	15	8	60	63	−3	41
21	Colorado Rapids	34	11	15	8	44	56	−12	41
22	Houston Dynamo FC	34	9	15	10	43	56	−13	37

Source: MLS
Rules for classification: 1) points; 2) total wins; 3) total goal differential; 4) total goals scored; 5) fewer disciplinary points; 6) away goal differential; 7) away goals scored; 8) home goals differential; 9) home goals scored; 10) coin toss (2 clubs tied) or drawing of lots (≥3 clubs tied)

==== Match results ====
February 22 1	San Jose Earthquakes	4–0	Real Salt Lake	San Jose, California
7:30 pm PST	Ricketts 28'; Rodrigues 70'; Espinoza (yellow card) 73'; Bouda 74'; Harkes (yellow card) 81'; Costa 83'; Kaye (yellow card) 87'; Daniel (yellow card) 90+4'	Report	Katranis (yellow card) 54'; Luna (yellow card) 90+3'	Stadium: PayPal Park; Attendance: 17,432; Referee: Malik Badawi

March 2 2	Sporting Kansas City	1–2	San Jose Earthquakes	Kansas City, Kansas
5:30 pm PST	Leibold (yellow card) 5'; Bartlett (yellow card) 16'; Joveljić 27' (pen.); Davis (yellow card) 45'; Radoja (yellow card) 67'	Report	Arango 3'; Martínez 19'; López (yellow card) 45+5' (yellow-red card) 52'	Stadium: Children's Mercy Park; Attendance: 16,277; Referee: Sergii Boiko

March 8 3	San Jose Earthquakes	0–1	Minnesota United FC	San Jose, California
7:30 pm PST	Leroux (yellow card) 61'	Report	Yeboah 33'; Dotson (yellow card) 45'	Stadium: PayPal Park; Attendance: 16,102; Referee: Ricardo Fierro

March 15 4	San Jose Earthquakes	1–2	Colorado Rapids	San Jose, California
7:30 pm PDT	Arango 45+1', (yellow card) 81'	Report	Bassett 38'; Cannon (yellow card) 57'; Harris 71'; Steffen (yellow card) 90+1'	Stadium: PayPal Park; Attendance: 15,302; Referee: Alexis Da Silva

March 22 5	Charlotte FC	4–1	San Jose Earthquakes	Charlotte, North Carolina
4:30 pm PDT	Biel 11'; Westwood 36'; Bronico 40', (yellow card) 40'; Vargas 52'; Diani (yellow card) 73'; Privett (red card) 74'	Report	Arango 77' (pen.); Rodrigues (yellow card) 80'	Stadium: Bank of America Stadium; Attendance: 27,463; Referee: Armando Villarreal

March 29 6	San Jose Earthquakes	1–1	Seattle Sounders FC	San Jose, California
7:30 pm PDT	Leroux 32'; Espinoza (yellow card) 35'; Bouda (yellow card) 59'	Report	Rusnák 80'; Ragen (yellow card) 90+2'	Stadium: PayPal Park; Attendance: 15,228; Referee: Guido Gonzales Jr.

April 6 7	San Jose Earthquakes	6–1	D.C. United	San Jose, California
2:00 pm PDT	Arango 8'; Martínez 16', 81', 90+2'; Espinoza 20' (pen.); Romney (yellow card) 59'; Costa (yellow card) 70'; Pellegrino 90'	Report	Benteke (yellow card) 18', (goal) 45+2'; Bartlett (yellow card) 72'	Stadium: PayPal Park; Attendance: 14,196; Referee: Victor Rivas

April 12 8	Los Angeles FC	2–1	San Jose Earthquakes	Los Angeles, California
7:30 pm PDT	Palencia 65'; Bouanga 86'	Report	Wilson (yellow card) 42'; Espinoza 90+5'	Stadium: BMO Stadium; Attendance: 22,110; Referee: Drew Fischer

April 19 9	San Jose Earthquakes	3–5	Sporting Kansas City	San Jose, California
7:30 pm PDT	Martínez 30'; Kaye (yellow card) 36'; Arango 42', 90+4' (pen.); Rodrigues (yellow card) 52'	Report	Ndenbe 18', (yellow card) 41'; Sallói 20', 73'; García 24'; Thommy 85'; Pulskamp (yellow card) 90+2'	Stadium: PayPal Park; Attendance: 14,147; Referee: Joe Dickerson

April 26 10	Columbus Crew	2–1	San Jose Earthquakes	Columbus, Ohio
4:30 pm PDT	Zawadzki 29'; Arfsten 62'; Moreira (yellow card) 84'; Schulte (yellow card) 86'	Report	Martínez 40'	Stadium: Lower.com Field; Attendance: 20,737; Referee: Guido Gonzales Jr.

May 3 11	San Jose Earthquakes	4–1	Portland Timbers	San Jose, California
7:30 pm PDT	Espinoza 16', 24'; Arango 27'; Harkes (yellow card) 38'; Munie (yellow card) 40'; Romney (yellow card) 55'; Bouda 88'; Costa (yellow card) 90+4'	Report	Mora 42'; Miller (yellow card) 90+2'	Stadium: PayPal Park; Attendance: 12,122; Referee: Fotis Bazakos

May 10 12	Colorado Rapids	0–2	San Jose Earthquakes	Commerce City, Colorado
6:30 pm PDT	Awaziem (yellow card) 28'; Atencio (yellow card) 38'; Maxsø (yellow card) 62'; Cabral (yellow card) 82'	Report	Bouda (yellow card) 36'; Jones 45+2'; Arango 67'	Stadium: Dick's Sporting Goods Park; Attendance: 15,003; Referee: Elijio Arreguin

May 14 13	San Jose Earthquakes	3–3	Inter Miami CF	San Jose, California
7:30 pm PDT	Arango 3'; Leroux 37'; Harkes 45+4'; Costa (yellow card) 45+7'; Bouda (yellow card) 66'; Romney (yellow card) 74'	Report	Falcón 1'; Allende 44', 52'; Allen (yellow card) 74'	Stadium: PayPal Park; Attendance: 18,000; Referee: Joe Dickerson

May 17 14	New England Revolution	0–0	San Jose Earthquakes	Foxborough, Massachusetts
4:30 pm PDT	Ceballos (yellow card) 31'; Beason (yellow card) 65'	Report	Floriani (yellow card) 35'; Leroux (yellow card) 78'; Lima (yellow card) 82'	Stadium: Gillette Stadium; Attendance: 31,078; Referee: Ricardo Montero

May 24 15	San Jose Earthquakes	3–3	Houston Dynamo FC	San Jose, California
7:30 pm PDT	Judd 66', 72', (yellow card) 89'; Munie 76'; Roberts (yellow card) 90+7'	Report	Ponce 31', (yellow card) 53'; Andrade 50'; Ortiz (yellow card) 89'; Dorsey 90+1'	Stadium: PayPal Park; Attendance: 15,457; Referee: Sergii Demianchuk

May 28 16	LA Galaxy	0–1	San Jose Earthquakes	Carson, California
7:00 pm PDT		Report	Kikanović (yellow card) 69'; Bouda 74'; Costa (yellow card) 90+1'	Stadium: Dignity Health Sports Park; Attendance: 15,345; Referee: Alexis Da Silva

May 31 17	St. Louis City SC	2–1	San Jose Earthquakes	St. Louis, Missouri
11:30 am PDT	Klauss (yellow card) 30', (goal) 45+2'; Silva (yellow card) 43'; Löwen 90+2' (pen.); Wallem (yellow card) 90+4' (yellow-red card) 90+6'	Report	Floriani (yellow card) 35'; Martínez 83'; Edwards Jr. (yellow card) 90'	Stadium: Energizer Park; Attendance: 22,423; Referee: Ismir Pekmic

June 13 18	Portland Timbers	1−1	San Jose Earthquakes	Portland, Oregon
7:30 pm PDT	Mosquera 71'	Report	Harkes (yellow card) 34' (yellow-red card) 52'; Espinoza (yellow card) 39'; Jones (yellow card) 46'; Judd 90+3'	Stadium: Providence Park; Attendance: 22,157; Referee: Victor Rivas

June 25 19	FC Dallas	2–4	San Jose Earthquakes	Frisco, Texas
5:30 pm PDT	Musa 30'; Moore 68'; Kaick (red card) 79'; Ibeagha (red card) 85'	Report	Munie (yellow card) 45+6'; Arango 50', (yellow card) 80'; Martínez 57'; Leroux 76'; Kaye (yellow card) 90+1', (goal) 90+9'	Stadium: Toyota Stadium; Attendance: 11,004; Referee: Timothy Ford
Note: 90-minute lightning delay

June 28 20	San Jose Earthquakes	1–1	LA Galaxy	Stanford, California
7:30 pm PDT	Rodrigues (yellow card) 11'; Leroux 16'; Floriani (yellow card) 46'	Report	Jørgensen (yellow card) 1'; Aude (yellow card) 42'; Garcés (yellow card) 50'; Reus 70'	Stadium: Stanford Stadium; Attendance: 42,881; Referee: Jair Marrufo

July 5 21	San Jose Earthquakes	1–1	New York Red Bulls	San Jose, California
7:30 pm PDT	Jones (yellow card) 54' (yellow-red card) 64'; Sofo 58' (o.g.); Judd (yellow card) 80'	Report	Forsberg 19'; Edelman (yellow card) 60'; Edwards (red card) 87'; Donkor (yellow card) 90+2'	Stadium: PayPal Park; Attendance: 17,580; Referee: Malik Badawi

July 12 22	Minnesota United FC	4–1	San Jose Earthquakes	Saint Paul, Minnesota
5:30 pm PDT	Oluwaseyi 3'; Yeboah 42'; Markanich 45+5'; Rosales 90+5'	Report	Harkes (yellow card) 9'; Rodrigues (yellow card) 38'; Roberts (yellow card) 64'; Munie (yellow card) 65'; Wilson 70'; Arango (yellow card) 84'	Stadium: Allianz Field; Attendance: 19,743; Referee: Ismir Pekmic

July 16 23	San Jose Earthquakes	2–2	FC Dallas	San Jose, California
7:30 pm PDT	Harkes 21', (yellow card) 68'; Costa (yellow card) 33'; Espinoza (yellow card) 45+8'; Wilson (yellow card) 80'; Daniel (yellow card) 85'; Martínez 86'	Report	Musa 45+3', 85'	Stadium: PayPal Park; Attendance: 15,304; Referee: Ramy Touchan

July 19 24	Seattle Sounders FC	3–2	San Jose Earthquakes	Seattle, Washington
5:30 pm PDT	Musovski 28', 54'; de la Vega 69'; Baker-Whiting (yellow card) 90+3'	Report	Judd 26'; Arango 64'; Espinoza (yellow card) 88'; Leroux (yellow card) 90'; Roberts (yellow card) 90+8'	Stadium: Lumen Field; Attendance: 30,129; Referee: Drew Fischer

July 26 25	Real Salt Lake	2–1	San Jose Earthquakes	Sandy, Utah
6:30 pm PDT	Caliskan (yellow card) 9'; Gozo (yellow card) 24'; Luna (yellow card) 42'; Ricketts 57' (o.g.); Ojeda 81'; Marczuk (yellow card) 83'; Cabral (yellow card) 90'	Report	Harkes (yellow card) 33'; Wilson (yellow card) 42'; Roberts (yellow card) 45+5' (yellow-red card) 83'; Martínez 51'; Floriani (yellow card) 54'	Stadium: America First Field; Attendance: 19,238; Referee: Pierre-Luc Lauziere

August 9 26	San Jose Earthquakes	2–1	Vancouver Whitecaps FC	San Jose, California
7:30 pm PDT	Bassi (yellow card) 34'; Raines (yellow card) 49'; Kowalczyk (yellow card) 76'; Awodesu (yellow card) 89'; Escobar (yellow card) 90+7'	Report	Sabbi 4' (yellow card) 38'; Berhalter (yellow card) 15' (goal) 42'; White (yellow card) 50' (goal) 56'; Johnson (yellow card) 70'	Stadium: PayPal Park; Attendance: 15,266; Referee: Rubiel Vazquez

August 17 27	San Jose Earthquakes	1–2	San Diego FC	San Jose, California
4:00 pm PDT	Martínez 72'; Daniel (yellow card) 80'; Judd (yellow card) 89'	Report	Ingvartsen 80'; Duah (yellow card) 83'; Dreyer 84' (yellow card) 84'; Boateng (yellow card) 86'	Stadium: PayPal Park; Attendance: 17,546; Referee: Joe Dickerson

August 23 28	Houston Dynamo FC	1–2	San Jose Earthquakes	Houston, Texas
5:30 pm PDT	McGlynn (yellow card) 21'; Ponce (yellow card) 35'; Antônio Carlos 72'	Report	Arango 28'; Kaye (yellow card) 30'; Espinoza (yellow card) 55'; Judd 64'; Roberts (yellow card) 90+3'	Stadium: Shell Energy Stadium; Attendance: 17,359; Referee: Sergii Boiko

August 30 29	Austin FC	3–1	San Jose Earthquakes	Austin, Texas
5:30 pm PDT	Bukari 12'; Uzuni 33'; Biro (yellow card) 67'; Wilson 77' (o.g.); Svatok (yellow card) 86'	Report	Vieira (yellow card) 41'; Munie 53'; Arango (yellow card) 71'	Stadium: Q2 Stadium; Attendance: 20,738; Referee: Jon Freemon

September 13 30	San Jose Earthquakes	2–4	Los Angeles FC	Santa Clara, California
5:30 pm PDT	Judd 18'; Arango (yellow card) 21'; Vieira (yellow card) 57'; Palencia 90' (o.g.)	Report	Son Heung-Min 1'; Bouanga 9' 12' 87'; Porteous (yellow card) 67'	Stadium: Levi's Stadium; Attendance: 50,978; Referee: Rubiel Vazquez

September 20 31	San Jose Earthquakes	1–3	St. Louis City SC	San Jose, California
7:30 pm PDT	Arango 31' (pen.); Vieira (yellow card) 45+2'; Judd (yellow card) 72'; Kikanović (yellow card) 81'	Report	McSorley 10', 45'; Hartel 19'; Becher (yellow card) 81'	Stadium: PayPal Park; Attendance: 15,337; Referee: Sergii Demianchuk

September 27 32	San Diego FC	0–1	San Jose Earthquakes	San Diego, California
7:30 pm PDT		Report	Martínez 14'; Vieira (yellow card) 71'; Bouda (yellow card) 83'	Stadium: Snapdragon Stadium; Attendance: 29,437; Referee: Armando Villarreal

October 5 33	Vancouver Whitecaps FC	4–1	San Jose Earthquakes	Vancouver, British Columbia
6:00 pm PDT	Elloumi 39'; Cubas (yellow card) 45+1'; Ocampo (yellow card) 47'; Müller 57'; Berhalter 74', 90+2'	Report	Espinoza (yellow card) 12'; Kikanović (yellow card) 38'; Arango (yellow card) 42'; Judd (yellow card) 67'; Leroux 89'	Stadium: BC Place; Attendance: 25,292; Referee: Rosendo Mendoza

October 18 34	San Jose Earthquakes	2–1	Austin FC	San Jose, California
6:00 pm PDT	Martínez 74'; Tsakiris 77'	Report	Wolff 22'; Dubersarsky (yellow card) 52'; Kolmanič (yellow card) 68'; Biro (yellow card) 90+2'	Stadium: PayPal Park; Attendance: 17,033; Referee: Filip Dujic

=== U.S. Open Cup ===
May 7 Round of 32	San Jose Earthquakes (California)	2–1	(California) Sacramento Republic FC	San Jose, California
7:30 pm PDT	Pellegrino 2'; Tsakiris (yellow card) 36'; Judd 43'; Buck (yellow card) 76'; Ricketts (red card) 83'	Report	Portillo (yellow card) 17'; Wanner (yellow card) 25'; Edwards (yellow card) 77'; Amann 90+6'	Stadium: PayPal Park; Attendance: 9,327; Referee: Ekaterina Koroleva

May 20 Round of 16	San Jose Earthquakes (California)	1−0 (a.e.t.)	(Oregon) Portland Timbers	San Jose, California
7:30 pm PDT	López (yellow card) 40'; Romney (yellow card) 77'; Costa (yellow card) 92'; Floriani (yellow card) 107'; Skahan 116'	Report	Antony (yellow card) 39'; Župarić (yellow card) 75'; Mora (yellow card) 86'; K. Miller (yellow card) 87'; Rodríguez (yellow card) 87'	Stadium: PayPal Park; Referee: Ramy Touchan

July 8 Quarterfinals	San Jose Earthquakes (California)	2−2 (2–4 p)	(Texas) Austin FC	San Jose, California
7:30 pm PDT	Arango 12', (yellow card) 57'; Daniel (yellow card) 63'; Kikanović 99'	Report	Hines-Ike (yellow card) 13'; Wolff (yellow card) 50'; Vázquez 65'; Svatok (yellow card) 90+1'; Desler (yellow card) 90+6'; Dubersarsky (yellow card) 98'; Uzuni 115'	Stadium: PayPal Park; Attendance: 10,754; Referee: Brandon Stevis
	Penalties
	Arango (penalty missed); Martínez (penalty scored); Jones (penalty missed); Harkes (penalty scored)		(penalty scored) Rubio; (penalty scored) Uzuni; (penalty scored) Taylor; (penalty scored) Wolff

=== Leagues Cup ===
San Jose Earthquakes did not qualify for the 2025 Leagues Cup as they were not one of the top 9 teams in the Western Conference for the 2024 season.
