= 2024 San Jose Earthquakes season =

San Jose Earthquakes
2024 season
- Head coach: Luchi Gonzalez
- Stadium: PayPal Park; San Jose, California
- MLS: Conference: 14th Overall: 29th
- MLS Cup Playoffs: Did not qualify
- U.S. Open Cup: Round of 16
- Leagues Cup: Round of 16
- Average home league attendance: 17,501
Home colors	Away colors

The 2024 season was the San Jose Earthquakes' 42nd year of existence, their 27th season in Major League Soccer, and their 17th consecutive season in the top-flight of American soccer. The season marked the 50th anniversary of the original San Jose Earthquakes' first season in the NASL. The club's jerseys unveiled for their season campaign, had commemorated the Earthquakes legacy, and donned the NASL Earthquakes' logo.

== Roster ==
As of December 7, 2023

No.	Pos.	Nation	Player
1	GK	USA	JT Marcinkowski (HG)
3	DF	FRA	Paul Marie
7	MF	ECU	Carlos Gruezo (DP)
10	FW	ARG	Cristian Espinoza (DP)
11	FW	USA	Jeremy Ebobisse
14	MF	USA	Jackson Yueill
15	DF	USA	Tanner Beason
20	MF	USA	Will Richmond (HG)
24	DF	USA	Daniel Munie
25	FW	BFA	Ousseni Bouda (GA)
26	DF	BRA	Rodrigues
28	FW	USA	Benjamin Kikanović
29	DF	EQG	Carlos Akapo
30	MF	USA	Niko Tsakiris (HG)
41	GK	USA	Emi Ochoa (HG)
42	GK	BRA	Daniel
55	MF	PHI	Michael Baldisimo
77	DF	USA	Casey Walls (HG)
99	MF	USA	Cruz Medina (HG)

== Transfers ==
=== In ===
No.	Pos.	Player	Previous club	Fee/notes	Date	Ref.
26	MF	(Brazil) Rodrigues	(Brazil) Grêmio	Loan purchase option	December 1, 2023	
19	FW	(United States) Preston Judd	(United States) LA Galaxy	Trade	December 14, 2023	
	MF	(United States) Alfredo Morales	(United States) New York City FC	Free transfer	January 4, 2024	
25	GK	(United States) William Yarbrough	(United States) Colorado Rapids	Free transfer	January 16, 2024	
	DF	(Brazil) Vítor Costa	(Portugal) Marítimo	Undisclosed fee	February 7, 2024	
	GK	(Poland) Mikołaj Biegański	(Poland) Wisła Kraków	Loan	February 8, 2024	
	DF	(Portugal) Bruno Wilson	(Portugal) Vizela	Undisclosed fee	February 8, 2024	
	FW	(Norway) Amahl Pellegrino	(Norway) Bodø/Glimt	Undisclosed fee	February 9, 2024	

=== Out ===
No.	Pos.	Player	Transferred to	Fee/notes	Date	Ref.
23	DF	(Sweden) Oskar Ågren	(Sweden) IK Brage	Option Declined	December 1, 2023	
9	FW	(Canada) Ayo Akinola	(Canada) Toronto FC	Loan ended	December 1, 2023	
19	MF	(United States) Cam Cilley	(United States) St. Louis City SC 2	Optioned Declined	December 1, 2023	
12	MF	(United States) Matthew Hoppe	(England) Middlesbrough	Loan ended	December 1, 2023	
93	MF	(Brazil) Judson	(Brazil) Avaí FC	Option Declined	December 1, 2023	
13	DF	(Brazil) Nathan	(United States) Seattle Sounders FC	Option Declined	December 1, 2023	
4	DF	(Ghana) Jonathan Mensah	(United States) New England Revolution	Out of contract	December 1, 2023	
35	MF	(Cape Verde) Jamiro Monteiro	(Turkey) Gaziantep	Option Declined	December 1, 2023	
17	DF	(United States) Keegan Tingey	(United States) Loudoun United	Option Declined	December 1, 2023	
21	DF	(Peru) Miguel Trauco	(Brazil) Criciúma	Option Declined	December 1, 2023	
44	FW	(United States) Cade Cowell	(Mexico) C.D. Guadalajara	Club record transfer, 3.65m	January 15, 2024	

== Competitions ==
=== Friendlies ===
January 27	San Jose Earthquakes	1–1	LA Galaxy
	Skahan	Report	Berry
Note: Closed-door friendly

February 2	San Jose Earthquakes	v	Sacramento Republic FC	San Jose, California
TBA				Stadium: PayPal Park
Note: Closed-door friendly

February 7 Coachella Valley Invitational	New York City FC	v	San Jose Earthquakes	Indio, California
12:00 pm PDT PST				Stadium: Empire Polo Club

February 10 Coachella Valley Invitational	Charlotte FC	v	San Jose Earthquakes	Indio, California
11:00 AM PST				Stadium: Empire Polo Club

February 14 Coachella Valley Invitational	San Jose Earthquakes	v	Portland Timbers	Indio, California
11:00 AM PST				Stadium: Empire Polo Club

February 17	San Jose Earthquakes	v	Vancouver Whitecaps FC	Indio, California
				Stadium: Empire Polo Club

May 23 Friendly	Guatemala	4–0	(United States) San Jose Earthquakes	San Jose, United States
	Carlos Santos; Rubio Rubin; Olger Escobar; Christopher Maldonado	Report		Stadium: PayPal Park

=== Major League Soccer ===
==== Standings ====
MLS Western Conference table (2024)
Pos	Team	Pld	W	L	T	GF	GA	GD	Pts
10	Austin FC	34	11	14	9	39	48	−9	42
11	FC Dallas	34	11	15	8	54	56	−2	41
12	St. Louis City SC	34	8	13	13	50	63	−13	37
13	Sporting Kansas City	34	8	19	7	51	66	−15	31
14	San Jose Earthquakes	34	6	25	3	41	78	−37	21

Source: MLS
Rules for classification: 1) points; 2) total wins; 3) total goal differential; 4) total goals scored; 5) fewer disciplinary points; 6) away goal differential; 7) away goals scored; 8) home goals differential; 9) home goals scored; 10) coin toss (2 clubs tied) or drawing of lots (≥3 clubs tied)

=== Overall table ===
Overall MLS standings table
Pos	Team	Pld	W	L	T	GF	GA	GD	Pts	Qualification
25	Nashville SC	34	9	16	9	38	54	−16	36	Qualification for the U.S. Open Cup Round of 32 (Note: As one of the U.S. teams who did not qualify for the 2025 CONCACAF Champions Cup or the 2025 Leagues Cup)
26	New England Revolution	34	9	21	4	37	74	−37	31	Qualification for the U.S. Open Cup Round of 32
27	Sporting Kansas City	34	8	19	7	51	66	−15	31	Qualification for the CONCACAF Champions Cup Round One (Note: Sporting Kansas City qualified as 2024 U.S. Open Cup finalists as the winners, Los Angeles FC, had already qualified via the 2024 Leagues Cup)
28	Chicago Fire FC	34	7	18	9	40	62	−22	30	Qualification for the U.S. Open Cup Round of 32
29	San Jose Earthquakes	34	6	25	3	41	78	−37	21	Qualification for the U.S. Open Cup Round of 32

Source: MLS
Rules for classification: 1) points; 2) total wins; 3) total goal differential; 4) total goals scored; 5) fewer disciplinary points; 6) away goal differential; 7) away goals scored; 8) home goals differential; 9) home goals scored; 10) coin toss (2 clubs tied) or drawing of lots (≥3 clubs tied)

==== Match results ====
February 24 1	FC Dallas	2–1	San Jose Earthquakes	Frisco, Texas
5:30 pm PST	Illarramendi 25'; Sealy 90+4'	Report	Kikanović 6'; Gruezo (yellow card) 21'; Rodrigues (yellow card) 45'	Stadium: Toyota Stadium; Attendance: 19,096; Referee: DeShun Beard

March 2 2	San Jose Earthquakes	1–3	LA Galaxy	San Jose, California
7:30 pm PST	Akapo (yellow card) 35'; Judd 70', (yellow card) 74'; Vítor Costa (yellow card) 90+3'	Report	Paintsil 18'; Delgado (yellow card) 29'; Joveljić 43'; Puig 48'	Stadium: PayPal Park; Attendance: 18,000; Referee: Cristian Campo Hernandez

March 9 3	San Jose Earthquakes	0–2	Vancouver Whitecaps FC	San Jose, California
7:30 pm PDT	Wilson (yellow card) 62'; Judd (yellow card) 73'; Morales (yellow card) 80'; Thompson (yellow card) 90+3'	Report	Schöpf 74'; Picault (yellow card) 80'; Ahmed 86'	Stadium: PayPal Park; Attendance: 16,045; Referee: Christopher Calderon

March 16 4	Sporting Kansas City	2–1	San Jose Earthquakes	Kansas City, Kansas
5:30 pm PDT	Rosero 18', (yellow card) 35'; Pulido 29'; Sallói (yellow card) 82'; Thommy (yellow card) 90+1'	Report	Vítor Costa 11'; Bouda (yellow card) 66'; Espinoza (yellow card) 81'	Stadium: Children's Mercy Park; Attendance: 18,219; Referee: Amin Hadzic

March 23 5	San Jose Earthquakes	3–2	Seattle Sounders FC	San Jose, California
7:30 pm PDT	Vítor Costa 42'; Espinoza 43'; Ebobisse 82'; Skahan (yellow card) 90+3'	Report	Teves (yellow card) 52'; Ragen (yellow card) 65'; Ruidíaz 72' (pen.); Musovski 81'	Stadium: PayPal Park; Attendance: 16,109; Referee: Gabriele Ciampi

March 30 6	Houston Dynamo FC	2–1	San Jose Earthquakes	Houston, Texas
5:30 pm PDT	Carrasquilla (yellow card) 45+2'; Ferreira 81', (yellow card) 88'; Escobar 85'	Report	Wilson 1'; Marie (yellow card) 9'; Judd (red card) 34'; Akapo (yellow card) 76'; Yueill (yellow card) 87' (yellow-red card) 90+5'; Gruezo (yellow card) 90+5'	Stadium: Shell Energy Stadium; Attendance: 16,184; Referee: Ismir Pekmic

April 6 7	Austin FC	4–3	San Jose Earthquakes	Austin, Texas
5:30 pm PDT	Gallagher (yellow card) 29'; Obrian (yellow card) 40', (goal) 63'; Driussi 62' (pen.), 90+11'; Biro 67'; Stuver (yellow card) 88'	Report	Beason (yellow card) 11'; Marie 20', (yellow card) 40'; Akapo (yellow card) 34'; Ebobisse 58'; Pellegrino 74'	Stadium: Q2 Stadium; Attendance: 20,738; Referee: Lukasz Szpala

April 13 8	San Jose Earthquakes	0–3	Colorado Rapids	San Jose, California
7:30 pm PDT	Morales (yellow card) 32'; Marie (yellow card) 48'; Judd (yellow card) 80'	Report	Navarro 10', 60'; Bassett (yellow card) 37', (goal) 80'	Stadium: PayPal Park; Attendance: 14,232; Referee: Malik Badawi

April 21 9	LA Galaxy	4–3	San Jose Earthquakes	Carson, California
5:15 pm PDT	Paintsil (yellow card) 7', (goal) 24' (pen.); Pec 14'; Yoshida 30'; Puig 56', (yellow card) 70'; Zavaleta (red card) 70'	Report	Rodrigues 32'; Espinoza (yellow card) 45'; Gruezo (yellow card) 54'; Kikanović 58'; Vítor Costa (yellow card) 65'; Ebobisse 72' (pen.); Skahan (yellow card) 76'	Stadium: Dignity Health Sports Park; Attendance: 25,335; Referee: Rosendo Mendoza
Note: Greg Vanney got a yellow card at (yellow card) 90+1'

April 27 10	Nashville SC	1–1	San Jose Earthquakes	Nashville, Tennessee
5:30 pm PDT	Lovitz (yellow card) 4'; Mukhtar 19'	Report	Tsakiris (yellow card) 14'; Kikanović (yellow card) 40'; Akapo (yellow card) 51'; Skahan 63'; Vítor Costa (yellow card) 90'	Stadium: Geodis Park; Attendance: 28,984; Referee: Allen Chapman

May 4 11	San Jose Earthquakes	3–1	Los Angeles FC	Santa Clara, California
4:30 pm PDT	Rodrigues 5'; Skahan (yellow card) 10'; Pellegrino 55'; Bouanga 59' (o.g.); Vítor Costa (yellow card) 75'	Report	Chanot (yellow card) 25'; Palencia (yellow card) 61'; Olivera 69'	Stadium: Levi's Stadium; Attendance: 43,774; Referee: Victor Rivas

May 11 12	Colorado Rapids	2–3	San Jose Earthquakes	Commerce City, Colorado
6:30 pm PDT	Mihailović (yellow card) 15'; Navarro 33', (yellow card) 84'; Fernandez 42'	Report	Pellegrino 44'; López 45+6'; Espinoza 66'; Vítor Costa (yellow card) 68'; Wilson (yellow card) 72'	Stadium: Dick's Sporting Goods Park; Attendance: 15,557; Referee: Natalie Simon

May 15 13	Portland Timbers	4–2	San Jose Earthquakes	Portland, Oregon
7:30 pm PDT	Evander 74'; Rodríguez 80', 90+10'; K. Miller (yellow card) 82'; Mora 90'	Report	Pellegrino 31'; López 34'; Wilson (red card) 71'; Yarbrough (yellow card) 89'	Stadium: Providence Park; Attendance: 19,113; Referee: Pierre-Luc Lauziere

May 18 14	San Jose Earthquakes	0–1	Orlando City SC	San Jose, California
7:30 pm PDT	Vítor Costa (yellow card) 70'; Espinoza (yellow card) 90+5'	Report	Lynn 89'	Stadium: PayPal Park; Attendance: 14,172; Referee: Malik Badawi

May 25 15	San Jose Earthquakes	1–1	Austin FC	San Jose, California
7:30 pm PDT	Ebobisse 10'; Wilson (yellow card) 41'; Espinoza (yellow card) 42'; Akapo (yellow card) 57'; Vítor Costa (yellow card) 64'	Report	Hines-Ike 45'; Driussi (yellow card) 48'	Stadium: PayPal Park; Attendance: 13,744; Referee: Chris Penso

May 31 16	New York City FC	5–1	San Jose Earthquakes	New York, New York
4:30 pm PDT	Fernández (yellow card) 15'; Tanasijević (yellow card) 17'; Wolf 50'; Sands (yellow card) 60'; Rodríguez 80'; Martínez 85', 90+2', 90+5'	Report	Yueill (yellow card) 23'; Pellegrino 53'	Stadium: Yankee Stadium; Attendance: 20,188; Referee: Mark Allatin

June 15 17	San Jose Earthquakes	2–4	FC Cincinnati	San Jose, California
7:30 pm PDT	López 57', (yellow card) 90+4'; Espinoza 72'	Report	Bucha 53'; Kelsy (yellow card) 66'; Kubo 78', 80', 87'	Stadium: PayPal Park; Attendance: 14,182; Referee: Lukasz Szpala

June 19 18	San Jose Earthquakes	1–2	Portland Timbers	San Jose, California
7:30 pm PDT	Marie 50'	Report	Evander 22', (yellow card) 76'; Bravo (yellow card) 48'; Rodríguez 72'; Fogaça (yellow card) 87'; Moreno (yellow card) 89'; E. Miller (yellow card) 90+4'	Stadium: PayPal Park; Attendance: 12,122; Referee: Marcos DeOliveira II

June 22 19	Los Angeles FC	6–2	San Jose Earthquakes	Los Angeles, California
7:30 pm PDT	Bogusz 15', 48'; Bouanga 26'; Kamara 33'; Hollingshead 42'; Ángel 87'	Report	Rodrigues 45+3'; Vítor Costa (yellow card) 46'; Kikanović 57'	Stadium: BMO Stadium; Attendance: 22,146; Referee: Segrii Boiko

June 29 20	San Jose Earthquakes	0–3	LA Galaxy	Stanford, California
7:30 pm PDT	Rodrigues (yellow card) 45+3'	Report	Delgado (yellow card) 22'; Cerrillo (yellow card) 29'; Paintsil 37'; Neal (yellow card) 39'; Joveljić 72'; McCarthy (yellow card) 75'; Cuevas 90+1'	Stadium: Stanford Stadium; Attendance: 40,844; Referee: Guido Gonzales Jr.

July 3 21	St. Louis City SC	2–0	San Jose Earthquakes	St. Louis, Missouri
5:30 pm PDT	Löwen 28'; Kijima 41'; Reid (yellow card) 56'; Vassilev (yellow card) 61'	Report	López (yellow card) 66'; Vítor Costa (yellow card) 72'	Stadium: CityPark; Attendance: 22,500; Referee: Malik Badawi

July 7 22	San Jose Earthquakes	1–0	Chicago Fire FC	San Jose, California
7:30 pm PDT	López 49', (yellow card) 62'; Skahan (yellow card) 87'	Report	Czichos (yellow card) 24'; Acosta (yellow card) 37'; Herbers (yellow card) 90+5'	Stadium: PayPal Park; Referee: Ramy Touchan

July 13 23	San Jose Earthquakes	1–2	Sporting Kansas City	San Jose, California
7:30 pm PDT	Kikanović (yellow card) 37'; Shelton 83' (o.g.); Skahan (yellow card) 87'	Report	Leibold (yellow card) 38'; Thommy 48'; Pulido 57'	Stadium: PayPal Park; Attendance: 12,034; Referee: Alexis Da Silva

July 17 24	San Jose Earthquakes	0–1	Houston Dynamo FC	San Jose, California
7:30 pm PDT		Report	Bassi (yellow card) 15'; Steres 86'	Stadium: PayPal Park; Attendance: 12,177; Referee: Natalie Simon

July 20 25	Minnesota United FC	2–0	San Jose Earthquakes	Saint Paul, Minnesota
5:30 PM	Bran (yellow card) 25'; Beason 38' (o.g.); Rosales (yellow card) 59'; Lod (yellow card) 68'; Hlongwane 75'	Report	Gruezo (yellow card) 45'; Judd (yellow card) 79'	Stadium: Allianz Field; Attendance: 19,679; Referee: Ismir Pekmic

August 24 26	Real Salt Lake	0–2	San Jose Earthquakes	Sandy, Utah
6:30 pm PDT	Brook (yellow card) 81'	Report	Espinoza 20'; Pellegrino 33'; Gruezo (yellow card) 37'; Daniel (yellow card) 87'	Stadium: America First Field; Attendance: 21,015; Referee: Ricardo Fierro

August 31 27	San Jose Earthquakes	1–2	Minnesota United FC	San Jose, California
7:30 pm PDT	Bouda 33'; Gruezo (yellow card) 87'	Report	Hlongwane 9', 64'; Díaz (yellow card) 79'	Stadium: PayPal Park; Referee: Sergii Demianchuk

September 14 28	Vancouver Whitecaps FC	2–0	San Jose Earthquakes	Vancouver, British Columbia
7:30 pm PDT	Picault 35'; Priso (yellow card) 41'; Armstrong 86'	Report	Akapo (yellow card) 26'; Skahan (yellow card) 89'	Stadium: BC Place; Attendance: 21,309; Referee: Lukasz Szpala

September 18 29	Seattle Sounders FC	2–2	San Jose Earthquakes	Seattle, Washington
7:30 pm PDT	Morris 21', 39'	Report	Pellegrino 15'; López (yellow card) 20'; Espinoza (yellow card) 38'; Gruezo (yellow card) 51'; Marie 89'	Stadium: Lumen Field; Attendance: 29,326; Referee: Victor Rivas

September 21 30	San Jose Earthquakes	1–2	St. Louis City SC	San Jose, California
7:30 pm PDT	Ebobisse 40'	Report	Teuchert 4'; Hartel 13' (pen.), (yellow card) 39'	Stadium: PayPal Park; Attendance: 15,112; Referee: Ricardo Montero

September 28 31	CF Montréal	3–0	San Jose Earthquakes	Montreal, Quebec
4:30 pm PDT	Marshall-Rutty (yellow card) 48'; Martínez 51', 55'; Edwards (yellow card) 52'; Clark 72'; Pearce (yellow card) 90+1'	Report	Gruezo (yellow card) 60'; Yueill (yellow card) 66'; Morales (yellow card) 86'	Stadium: Saputo Stadium; Attendance: 19,619; Referee: Armando Villarreal

October 2 32	San Jose Earthquakes	3–2	FC Dallas	San Jose, California
7:30 pm PDT	López 13', 79'; Marie (yellow card) 37'; Gruezo (yellow card) 73'; Ebobisse 83'	Report	Tafari (yellow card) 15'; Velasco 41', (yellow card) 55'; Ibeagha (yellow card) 60', (goal) 90'; Arriola (yellow card) 74'	Stadium: PayPal Park; Referee: Lorenzo Hernandez

October 5 33	San Jose Earthquakes	0–1	Real Salt Lake	San Jose, California
7:30 pm PDT		Report	Katranis (yellow card) 45'; Julio (yellow card) 53'; Luna 78'; MacMath (yellow card) 85'; Glad (yellow card) 90+5'	Stadium: PayPal Park; Attendance: 16,322; Referee: Mark Allatin

October 19 34	Los Angeles FC	3–1	San Jose Earthquakes	Los Angeles, California
6:00 pm PDT	Bouanga 64'; Atuesta 75'; Marlon 90+1'	Report	Yueill 9'; Rodrigues (yellow card) 31'; Akapo (yellow card) 53'; Verhoeven (yellow card) 85'	Stadium: BMO Stadium; Attendance: 22,137; Referee: Pierre-Luc Lauziere

=== U.S. Open Cup ===
May 7 Round of 32	San Jose Earthquakes (California)	1–0	(California) Oakland Roots SC	San Jose, California
7:00 pm PDT	Bouda (yellow card) 51', (goal) 76'; Judd (yellow card) 84'	Report	Rasmussen (yellow card) 19'; Hackshaw (yellow card) 24'; Rodriguez (red card) 82'	Stadium: PayPal Park; Referee: Jeffrey Greeson

May 21 Round of 16	Sacramento Republic FC (California)	4–3 (a.e.t.)	(California) San Jose Earthquakes	Sacramento, California
7:00 pm PDT	Phillips 17', 38'; R. López (yellow card) 56'; Amann (yellow card) 70'; Rodrigues (yellow card) 79', (goal) 106'; Wiedt (yellow card) 105+1'; Herrera 107'	Report	Judd 11', (yellow card) 53'; Espinoza 80', (yellow card) 104'; H. López 100'	Stadium: Heart Health Park; Attendance: 11,569; Referee: Filip Dujic

=== Leagues Cup ===
==== West 2 ====
Pos	Team	Pld	W	PW	PL	L	GF	GA	GD	Pts	Qualification	LAX	SJE	GUA
1	(United States Soccer Federation) LA Galaxy	2	1	1	0	0	4	3	+1	5	Advance to knockout stage	—	—	—
2	(United States Soccer Federation) San Jose Earthquakes	2	0	1	0	1	2	3	−1	2	Advance to knockout stage	1–2	—	—
3	(Mexican Football Federation) Guadalajara	2	0	0	2	0	3	3	0	2		2–2	1–1	—

Source: Leagues Cup
Rules for classification: Tiebreakers

July 27 Group stage	Guadalajara (Mexico)	1–1 (3–4 p)	(United States) San Jose Earthquakes	Santa Clara, California
7:00 pm PDT	González (yellow card) 41'; Briseño (yellow card) 54'; Rangel (yellow card) 87'; Beltrán (yellow card) 88'; Alvarado 90+8'	Report	Ebobisse 6'; Gruezo (yellow card) 41'; Daniel (yellow card) 55'; López (yellow card) 72'; Rodrigues (yellow card) 87'; Yueill (yellow card) 88'; Morales (yellow card) 90+6'	Stadium: Levi's Stadium; Attendance: 50,675; Referee: Mario Escobar
	Penalties
	Alvarado (penalty missed); Mozo (penalty scored); Gutiérrez (penalty scored); Cowell (penalty missed); Beltrán (penalty scored)		(penalty scored) Skahan; (penalty missed) Marie; (penalty scored) Rodrigues; (penalty scored) Morales; (penalty scored) Vítor Costa

July 31 Group stage	San Jose Earthquakes (United States)	1–2	(United States) LA Galaxy	San Jose, California
7:30 pm PDT	Espinoza (yellow card) 56'; Ebobisse 75'	Report	Fagúndez 41'; Nelson (yellow card) 60'; Yoshida (yellow card) 82'; Berry 89'; Yamane (yellow card) 90+6'	Stadium: PayPal Park; Attendance: 12,554; Referee: Lukasz Szpala

==== Knockout stage ====
August 8 Round of 32	San Jose Earthquakes (United States)	5–0	(Mexico) Necaxa	San Jose, California
8:00 pm PDT	Yueill 5'; López 17'; Ebobisse 29', 35'; Rodrigues (yellow card) 45+4'; Espinoza (yellow card) 76'; Judd (yellow card) 77'; Marie 88'	Report	Montes (red card) 43'; Andrade (yellow card) 53'; Monreal (yellow card) 57'; Badaloni (yellow card) 82'	Stadium: PayPal Park; Referee: Lukasz Szpala (United States)

August 13 Round of 16	Los Angeles FC (United States)	4–1	(United States) San Jose Earthquakes	Los Angeles, California
	Olivera 17'; Bouanga 45+5' (pen.), 66'; Bogusz 61'	Report	López 41'; Yarbrough (yellow card) 45+2'	Stadium: BMO Stadium
