= Carlos Gruezo =

Carlos Gruezo may refer to:

- Carlos Gruezo (footballer, born 1975), former Ecuadorian footballer
- Carlos Gruezo (footballer, born 1995), Ecuadorian footballer
