= Cristian Arango =

Colombian footballer (born 1995)

Personal information
- Full name: Cristian Daniel Arango Duque
- Date of birth: 9 March 1995 (age 31)
- Place of birth: Medellín, Colombia
- Height: 1.78 m (5 ft 10 in)
- Position: Forward

Team information
- Current team: Atlético Nacional (on loan from San Jose Earthquakes)
- Number: 17

Youth career
- 2012: Envigado

Senior career*
Years	Team	Apps	(Gls)
2012–2016	Envigado	71	(7)
2015–2016	→ Valencia B (loan)	26	(8)
2017	Millonarios	12	(3)
2017–2019	Benfica	0	(0)
2017–2018	→ Aves (loan)	19	(1)
2018–2019	→ Tondela (loan)	16	(1)
2019–2021	Millonarios	53	(21)
2021–2022	Los Angeles FC	54	(32)
2023	Pachuca	11	(5)
2023–2024	Real Salt Lake	45	(23)
2025–	San Jose Earthquakes	30	(13)
2026–	→ Atlético Nacional (loan)	15	(2)

International career^{‡}
2021–	Colombia	2	(0)
- * Club domestic league appearances and goals as of 8 July 2026 ‡ National team caps and goals as of 28 January 2023

Cristian Daniel "Chicho" Arango Duque (born 9 March 1995) is a Colombian professional footballer who plays as a forward for Colombian club Atlético Nacional, on loan from San Jose Earthquakes, and the Colombia national football team.

== Club career ==
=== Early career ===
Arango began his professional career with Envigado in 2012, aged 17. For the 2015–16 season, he was loaned out to Valencia B, Valencia's reserve team in the third division, where he scored eight goals in 26 games. At the end of the season, he returned to Envigado to play the 2016 Finalizacion season, where he played in all 20 games, scoring four goals.

In January 2017, his move to Millonarios was made official. He played with them in the 2017 Apertura and the 2017 Copa Libertadores, and although he did not get much playing time due to injuries, his performance interested many European clubs.

=== Portugal ===
On 28 June 2017, he was confirmed as a Benfica player, signing a five-year contract After playing the preseason with the club, the board decided to send him on loan. In August 2017, Desportivo Aves signed him on a one-year loan. On 10 January 2018, he scored two important goals in a match against Rio Ave; first, he scored in the last minute of the game to tie the score at 3-3 and send the game into extra time. He added another in extra time, and scored his penalty in the shootout to help his club qualify to the semi-finals of the Taça de Portugal. Aves later won the cup, defeating Sporting CP in the final, although Arango did not play.

On 9 July 2018, he was loaned out again, this time to Tondela.

=== Return to Millonarios ===
On 10 July 2019, Arango returned to Millonarios, signing a three-year contract.

=== Los Angeles FC ===
On 2 August 2021, Arango joined Major League Soccer club Los Angeles FC. Arango made an immediate impact, scoring 14 goals in 17 league matches, and was named Newcomer of the Year.

=== C.F. Pachuca ===
In February 2023 Chicho joined Liga MX Mexican side team C.F. Pachuca from LAFC on a three-year contract.

Arango played the Clausura 2023 with the Tuzos where he was active in 11 games, five as a starter, and scored five goals.

=== Real Salt Lake ===
On 10 June 2023, Major League Soccer club Real Salt Lake signed Arango through 2025 with an option for 2026. He made his first appearance for the club on 8 July 2023, scoring the opening goal in a 4–0 home win over Orlando City. On 20 February 2024, it was announced that Arango would be the new captain of Real Salt Lake. On 30 March Arango scored a second-half hat-trick, with one of the goals being a penalty, in a 3–1 victory over St. Louis City. On 1 June Arango scored another hat trick in a 5–1 win against Austin FC.

=== San Jose Earthquakes ===
On 11 January 2025 it was announced that Arango had been traded to San Jose Earthquakes from Real Salt Lake, for $1.4 million in GAM (General Allocation Money) and one international roster spot for the 2026 season.

== International career ==
On 16 November 2021, Arango made his senior national team debut in a World Cup qualifier against Paraguay.

== Career statistics ==
=== Club ===
As of match played 6 April 2025

Appearances and goals by club, season, and competition
Club	Season	League			National cup (Note: Includes Copa Colombia, Taça de Portugal and U.S. Open Cup)		League cup (Note: Includes Taça da Liga)		Continental (Note: Includes Copa Libertadores, Copa Sudamericana, CONCACAF Champions Cup and Leagues Cup)		Total	
Club	Season	Division	Apps	Goals	Apps	Goals	Apps	Goals	Apps	Goals	Apps	Goals
Envigado	2012	Categoría Primera A	0	0	2	0	—		—		2	0
Envigado	2013	Categoría Primera A	18	1	4	0	—		—		22	1
Envigado	2014	Categoría Primera A	7	0	2	0	—		—		9	0
Envigado	2015	Categoría Primera A	26	2	5	2	—		—		31	4
Envigado	2016	Categoría Primera A	20	4	1	0	—		—		21	4
Envigado	Total		71	7	14	2	0	0	0	0	85	9
Valencia B (loan)	2015–16	Segunda División B	26	8	—		—		—		26	8
Millonarios	2017	Categoría Primera A	12	3	0	0	—		1	0	13	3
Aves (loan)	2017–18	Primeira Liga	19	1	3	2	0	0	—		22	3
Tondela (loan)	2018–19	Primeira Liga	16	1	1	0	3	2	—		20	3
Millonarios	2019	Categoría Primera A	10	2	2	1	—		—		12	3
Millonarios	2020	Categoría Primera A	21	10	1	1	—		3	1	23	12
Millonarios	2021	Categoría Primera A	22	9	0	0	—		—		22	9
Millonarios	Total		53	21	3	2	0	0	3	1	57	24
Los Angeles FC	2021	MLS	17	14	0	0	—		—		17	14
Los Angeles FC	2022	MLS	37	18	3	3	—		—		40	21
Los Angeles FC	Total		54	32	3	3	0	0	0	0	57	35
Pachuca	2022–23	Liga MX	11	5	0	0	—		2	0	13	5
Real Salt Lake	2023	MLS	13	6	1	0	—		4	2	18	8
Real Salt Lake	2024	MLS	32	17	1	0	—		1	0	34	17
Real Salt Lake	Total		45	23	2	0	0	0	5	2	52	25
San Jose Earthquakes	2025	MLS	7	4	0	0	—		—		7	4
Career total			314	105	26	9	3	2	11	3	354	119

== Honours ==
Aves

- Taça de Portugal: 2017–18

Los Angeles FC

- MLS Cup: 2022
- Supporters' Shield: 2022

Individual

- MLS Newcomer of the Year: 2021
- MLS All-Star: 2024
