= California Clásico =

Soccer rivalry between the LA Galaxy and the San Jose Earthquakes

- Location: California, U.S.
- Teams: LA Galaxy; San Jose Earthquakes
- First meeting: April 28, 1996; MLS regular season LA 2–1 SJ
- Latest meeting: June 28, 2025; MLS regular season SJ 1–1 LA
- Next meeting: July 25, 2026; MLS regular season SJ v LA

Statistics
- Total meetings: 104
- Most wins: LA Galaxy (50)
- Top scorer: Landon Donovan (16)
- All-time series: LA: 50; Drawn: 20; SJ: 34
- Largest victory: LA 0–4 SJ; MLS regular season (October 14, 2020)

The California Clásico is the name given to the soccer rivalry between the LA Galaxy and the San Jose Earthquakes. This Major League Soccer rivalry reached its zenith from 2001 to 2005, during which time the Earthquakes and the Galaxy combined to win four MLS Cup titles. The term "Clasico" is commonly used to refer to other rivalries in Spanish-speaking countries, most prominently, the Spanish Clásico between Barcelona and Real Madrid, or the Argentine Superclásico between Boca Juniors and River Plate.

Los Angeles and San Jose is considered to be one of the most historical rivalries in U.S. soccer. The British daily newspaper The Guardian rates "the California Clasico is perhaps the most historic and intense rivalry the league has." Todd Dunivant, the retired U.S. national team and MLS player, when asked about the rivalry stated "I think it's the best rivalry in MLS, I think it's got the most history, it's got the most meaningful big games".

The rivalry originated from the historical Northern California vs. Southern California sporting and cultural rivalries, as well as from the relative proximity of the cities, which are about 360 miles (580 km) apart, which allows rival fans to attend each other's games.

== History ==
=== 1996–2005 ===
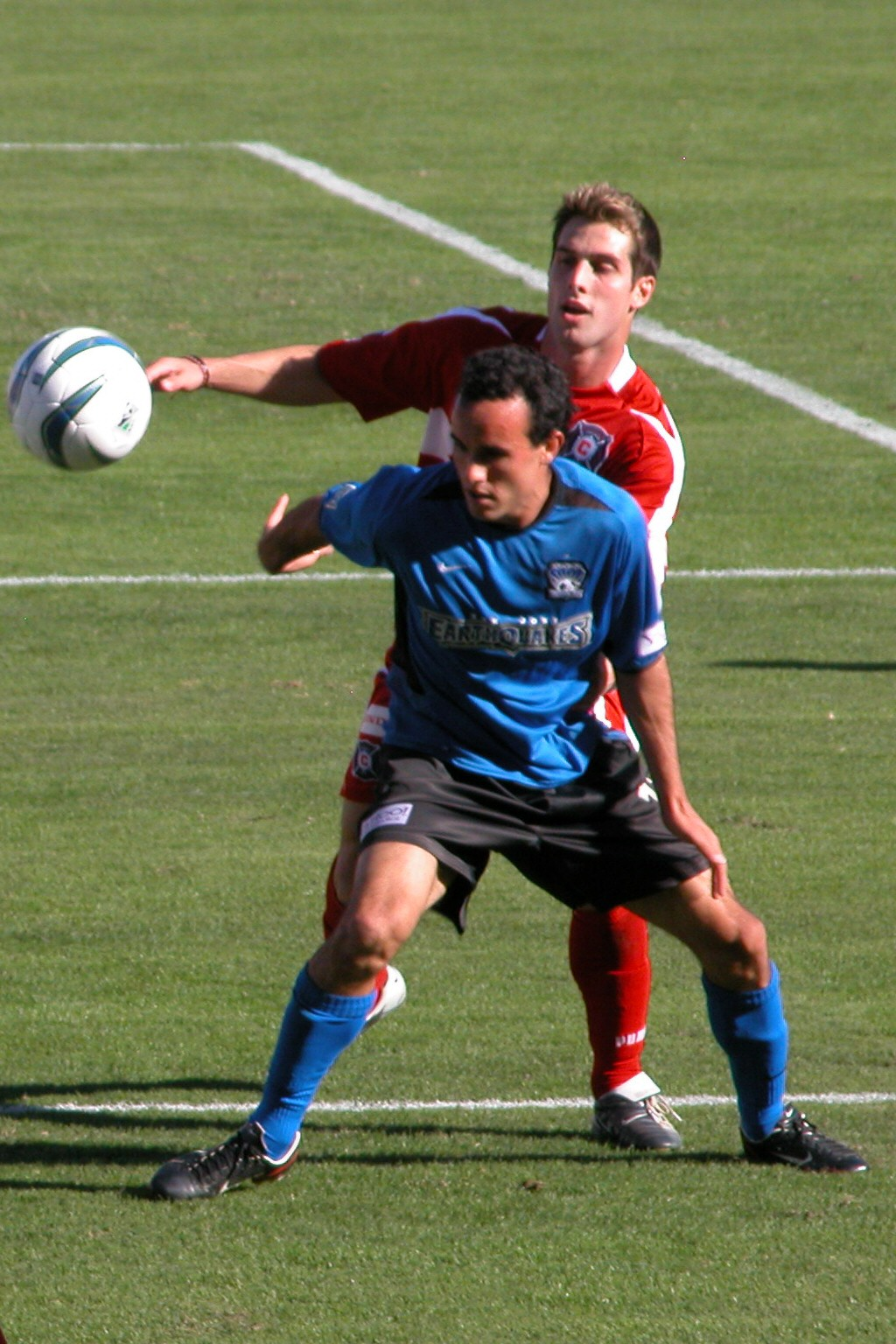
Donovan with the San Jose Earthquakes at the 2003 MLS Cup

Unified as one single state, Northern California and Southern California share a notorious rivalry. Historically, rivalries have manifested prominently in the state's professional sports including MLB, NBA, NFL and NHL. For some fans, it is traditional to hate teams from Northern or Southern California.

Both clubs were charter members of Major League Soccer in its inaugural season, with the San Jose Clash hosting the very first MLS game, shortly before their first home Clásico against the Los Angeles Galaxy in a match that drew 31,728 fans to Spartan Stadium, setting the record for attendance at a sporting event in the city of San Jose. The Clash became the Earthquakes on October 27, 1999, in readiness for the 2000 season. In 2001, both teams reached the MLS Cup 2001, with San Jose posting a 2–1 overtime victory on goals by Landon Donovan and Dwayne DeRosario. While next season, Carlos Ruiz led Los Angeles to its first MLS Cup title over the New England Revolution after San Jose was previously upset in the playoffs by the Columbus Crew. While there have been several players to play for both teams beforehand, the rivalry intensified after the Anschutz Entertainment Group (owner of the Los Angeles Galaxy) took sole ownership of the San Jose Earthquakes in December 2002.

The two teams squared off again in the first round of the 2003 MLS Cup playoffs in what would become an epic series. Los Angeles won the first game at home 2–0 in the two-game aggregate-goal series. The Galaxy led by four goals after the first two minutes of the second game in San Jose, but San Jose responded with five unanswered goals to take the game and the series, 5–4. That contest was regarded as the best in league history by many impartial MLS analysts at the time. After eliminating the Galaxy, San Jose went on to defeat the Kansas City Wizards en route to winning its second MLS Cup title (over the Chicago Fire) in three years.

After a rumored buyout of the Quakes by Mexican soccer side Club América in January 2004, Earthquakes general manager Johnny Moore resigned prior to the 2004 season and was replaced by former U.S. and Galaxy defender Alexi Lalas. Under Lalas, 2004 ended up being a down year for the Quakes as it barely made the playoffs on the final day of the regular season. Both San Jose and Los Angeles were eliminated from the playoffs by Kansas City. Afterward, when Earthquakes star player Landon Donovan briefly returned to German club Bayer 04 Leverkusen after his loan agreement with San Jose expired, Lalas traded away his return rights, after which Donovan returned to play for the Galaxy. Many Earthquake fans felt betrayed and welcomed Donovan with a hostile reception when Galaxy would play at Spartan Stadium, he would be often referred to as the "American Luís Figo" as to when Figo made a hugely controversial move from Barcelona to bitter rivals Real Madrid. Several San Jose fans altered their Donovan jerseys name on the back to read "Donowho". They also brought signs with explicit messages like "Landon Judas Donovan", "PrimaDonovan Traitor" and "Donovan Is Traitor Scum."

Following the departure of Lalas to become the general manager of the MetroStars early in 2005, San Jose returned to form and captured the MLS Supporters' Shield, awarded to the league's best team during the regular season. The two clubs met again in the playoffs, with Los Angeles finally winning a playoff series against San Jose thanks largely to the play of Donovan on its way to defeating New England in MLS Cup 2005.

=== On hiatus ===
The Earthquakes took a two-year hiatus from the league in 2006 and 2007 due to stadium and ownership issues. During that period, the Quakes' players and head coach were relocated to Houston, where they won both season's MLS Cups at the Houston Dynamo. Meanwhile, shortly after Lalas' brief stint with the MetroStars, he moved on to become the general manager of the Galaxy, who failed to make the playoffs during both years of San Jose's hiatus from the league.

=== 2008–present ===
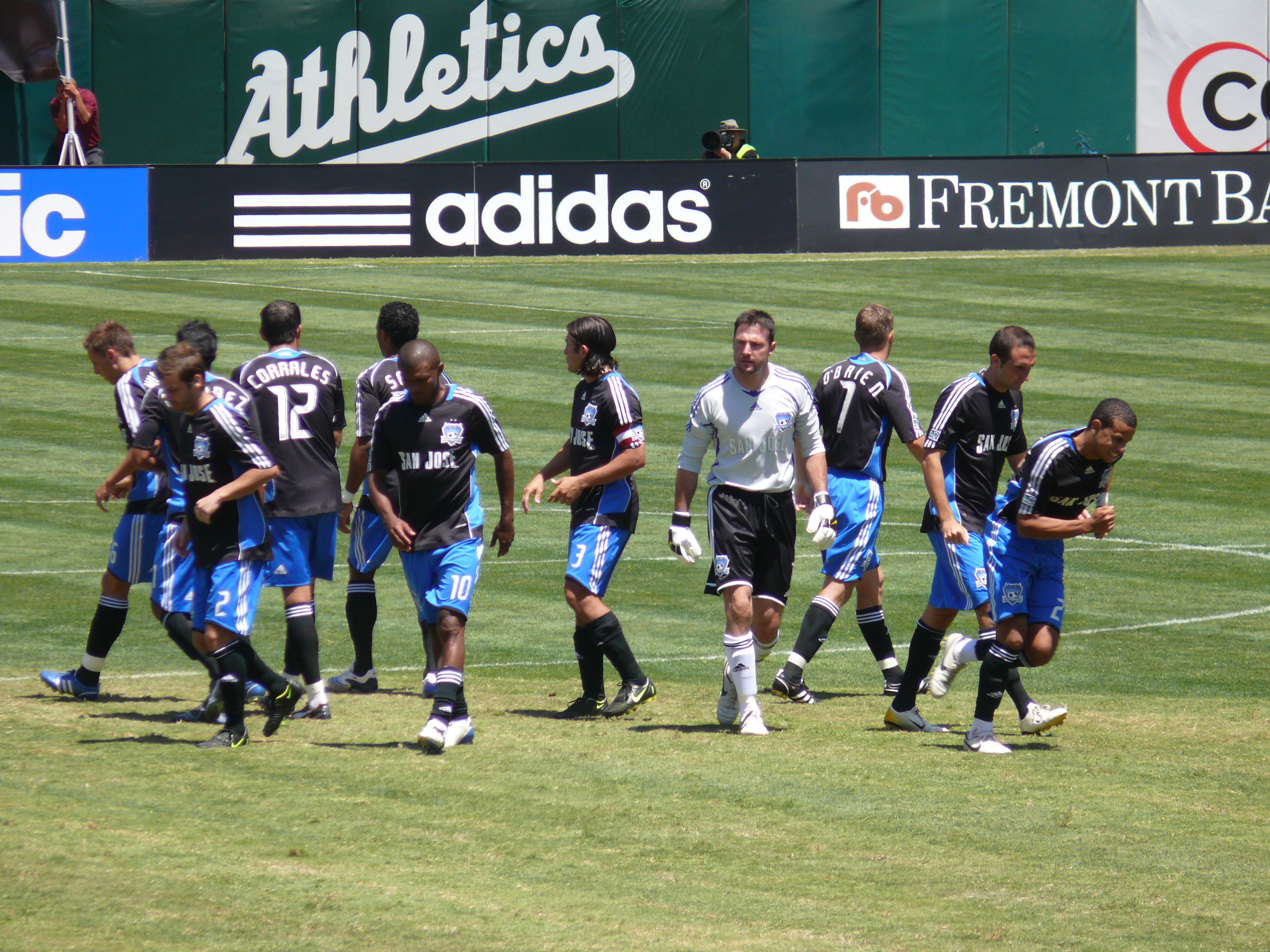
The Earthquakes on the field at the O.co Coliseum in 2008 Clasico

The San Jose Earthquakes franchise was revived by Lewis Wolff and Earthquakes Soccer, LLC, restarting the rivalry in 2008. Ignominiously, both the Quakes and Galaxy tied for the worst record that season. The Quakes lost the series and thus received the dubious distinction.

On June 25, 2011, Josh Saunders came in for injured goalie Donovan Ricketts. Saunders received a red card for what appeared to be an intentional elbow to the face of Steven Lenhart. Galaxy had no more substitute goalies and were forced to use forward Mike Magee as a last resort. Magee kept a shutout as the game ended 0-0.

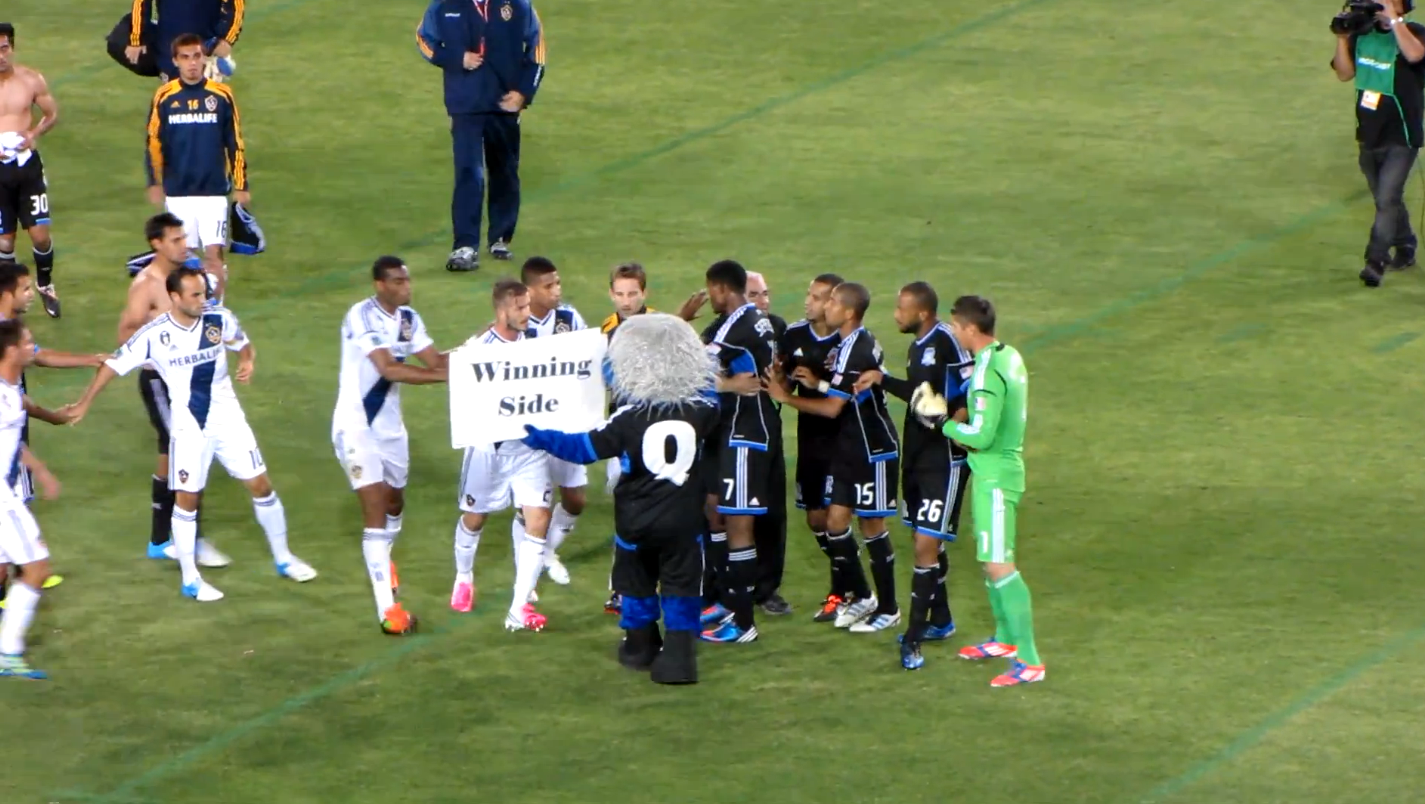
Scuffles between the two teams in 2012

The rivalry further intensified in 2012 when the Galaxy hosted the Earthquakes at The Home Depot Center with Galaxy taking the lead 2–0 but with 15 minutes left the Earthquakes came back and won the game 3–2. In late June, the Earthquakes played the Galaxy in front of 50,391 spectators at Stanford Stadium marking an attendance record for the Earthquakes franchise. Once again the Galaxy took the lead 3–2 at half time but the Earthquakes managed to score two goals to defeat the Galaxy 4–3, David Beckham was involved in scuffles during and after the match, he was handed a one-match ban by the MLS Disciplinary Committee. The match itself was credited as one of the best MLS games in history. Galaxy's Omar Gonzalez expressed that the Earthquakes were "embarrassing", "obnoxious" and "a bunch of jokes" after a 2–2 draw.

The two teams met again in the Western Conference Semi-finals. San Jose defeated Los Angeles 1–0 in the first leg but the Galaxy came back and defeated the Earthquakes 3–1 at Buck Shaw Stadium, (3–2 on aggregate). It was the Earthquakes only loss at Buck Shaw all season.

In June 2013, the Clásico returned to Stanford Stadium and in stunning comeback fashion, the Earthquakes defeated the Galaxy with two goals by Shea Salinas and Alan Gordon in stoppage time (92',93') to win the game 3–2, after they trailed 0–2 after 68 minutes. San Jose became the first MLS team ever to win a game in added time with 10 men after Víctor Bernárdez was red carded in the 77th minute.

For the first time, the California Clásico was hosted in Fresno, California, as part of the inaugural Central California Cup on February 15, 2014. The preseason exhibition match marked the first time two MLS franchises played each other in the city of Fresno.

In June 2015, the Earthquakes hosted the Galaxy at Stanford in front of 50,422 spectators. The June 2016 match set a new attendance record of 50,816.

The first Clásico of 2017 took place during preseason, at Cashman Field in Las Vegas on February 11, and San Jose won after Olmes García, acquired by San Jose in the Waiver Draft but released later on during preseason, scored in the 89th minute. The Earthquakes lost the first regular season Clásico of 2017 at home by a score of 4–2. During this match, new Earthquake Danny Hoesen scored his first goal for the club, Giovani dos Santos scored a penalty after a foul in the box by Kofi Sarkodie, and Víctor Bernárdez scored an own goal to give Los Angeles the 3–2 lead just before halftime. The two teams met again a month later at Stanford on July 1 in front of a crowd of 50,617. Jelle van Damme opened the scoring for LA in the 11th minute off of a corner kick set piece, and LA remained in the lead until the 75th minute, when San Jose goalkeeper David Bingham earned an assist on Chris Wondolowski's equalizer. Shea Salinas scored the winner in the third minute of stoppage time, bringing his total of stoppage time Clasico winners up to two, and he received a yellow card for taking off his shirt in celebration as a tribute to former teammate and fellow stoppage time hero Alan Gordon. The third official Clásico was fought just a week later on July 10, when San Jose and Los Angeles met again at Avaya Stadium, this time in the quarterfinals of the U.S. Open Cup. LA captain van Damme once again opened the scoring off of a corner kick, and once again San Jose came back to win, this time 3–2, on a Chris Wondolowski brace assisted entirely by Tommy Thompson and Hoesen's winner scored on a counter launched by Jahmir Hyka, with LA's second tally coming after an own goal that deflected off the back of San Jose keeper Andrew Tarbell. San Jose advanced to the semifinals of the tournament for the first time since 2004 and only the second time in franchise history. This match also saw Wondolowski tie Ronald Cerritos for the team's top goalscorer in the Open Cup.

On April 21, 2024, the Galaxy survived a late resurgence from the Quakes to win the 100th edition of the Clásico in LA. The Galaxy, leading for much of the game with a two/three goals cushion, played with 10 men for the final 27 minutes of the game after Eriq Zavaleta was sent off for a foul in the penalty area. Despite scoring in the 70th minute, San Jose weren't able to score another and the match ended 4–3 with Riqui Puig scored the winning goal for LA in the 56th minute.

== Supporter groups ==
Although historically there have been rivalries between Northern California and Southern California supporters, a bitter rivalry exists between the San Jose Ultras and the Angel City Brigade, who support Los Angeles. Supporters from both teams taunt each other with elaborate tifo displays and chants due to the passion and hate there is. Heightened security is used to ensure no violence between the opposing groups. Social networking sites such as Facebook have also been used to jeer rival fans ensuring the rivalry continues outside of soccer.

Due to the relative proximity of the cities, which are about 360 miles (580 km) apart, charter buses and shuttle vans are used to allow rival fans to attend each other's games.

== Incidents ==
On October 21, 2012, during a regular season game at Buck Shaw Stadium, several LA Galaxy fans were arrested after violent altercations erupted in the stands and smoke bombs were set off during half time. In fear of causing a riot, Santa Clara and Sunnyvale police officers, some dressed in riot uniforms, arrived and cleared the Galaxy supporters section during the game.

== Crossing the divide ==
=== Player transfers ===
While the transfer of Landon Donovan from San Jose to Los Angeles caused an uproar amongst the fans, the rivalry between the two teams has not prevented players from switching teams.

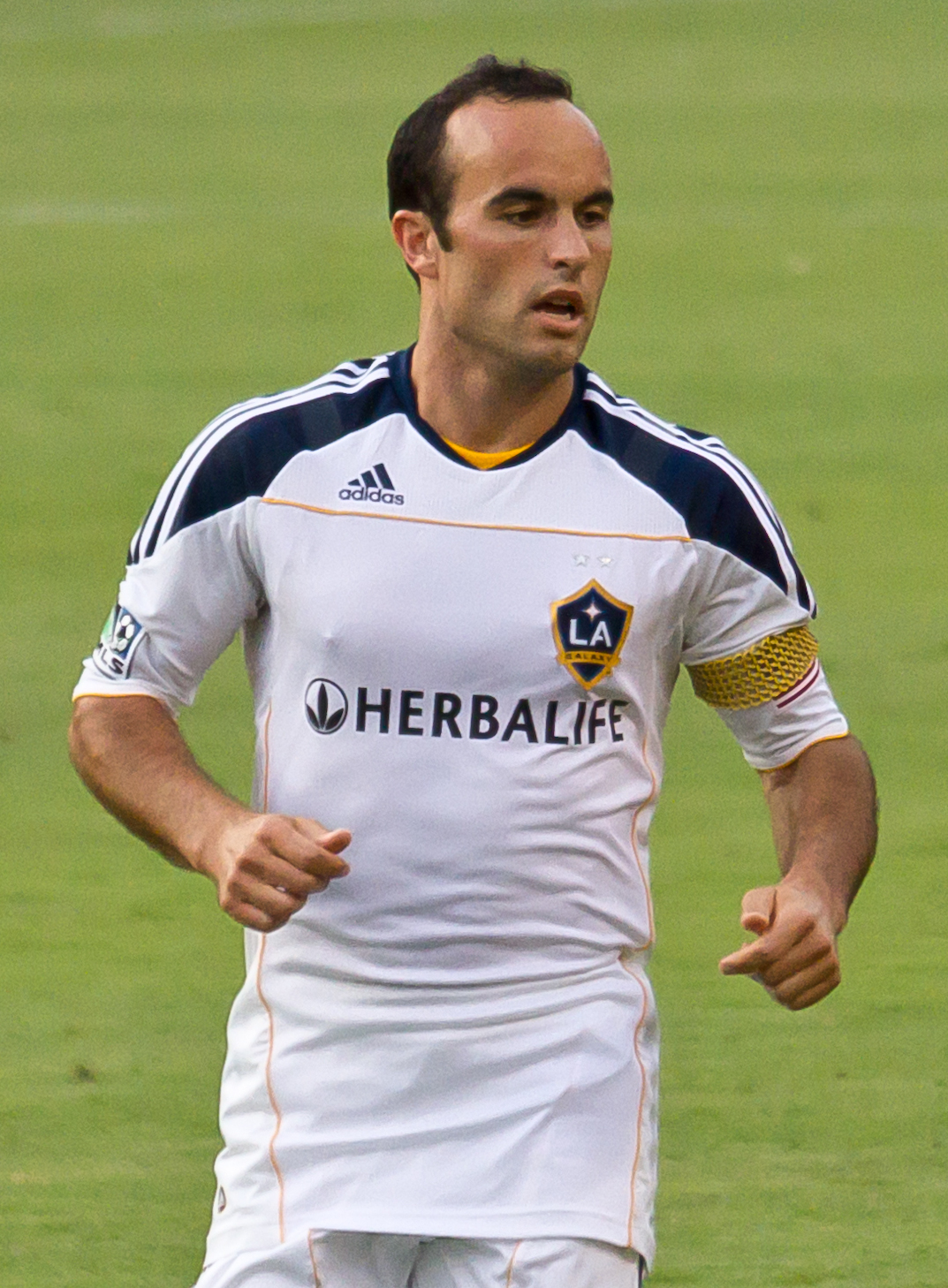
Landon Donovan playing for Los Angeles

- (United States) Curt Onalfo – with Galaxy: 1996; with San Jose: 1997
- (United States) David Kramer – with Galaxy: 1996–1997; with San Jose: 1997–1999
- (Armenia) Harut Karapetyan – with Galaxy: 1996–1998; with San Jose: 1998, 2000
- (United States) Dan Calichman – with Galaxy: 1996–1998; with San Jose: 2000
- (United States) Eddie Lewis – with San Jose: 1996–1999; with Galaxy: 2008–2010
- (United States) Lawrence Lozzano – with San Jose: 1997–1998; with Galaxy: 1998–1999
- (United States) Gabe Eastman – with Galaxy: 1999; with San Jose: 2000
- (United States) Adam Frye – with San Jose: 1999; with Galaxy: 2000–2002
- (United States) Zak Ibsen – with Galaxy: 1999–2000; with San Jose: 2001–2002
- (United States) Joe Cannon – with San Jose: 1999–2002, 2008–2010; with Galaxy: 2007
- (New Zealand) Simon Elliott – with Galaxy: 1999–2003; with San Jose: 2009
- (United States) Danny Califf – with Galaxy: 2000–2004; with San Jose: 2005
- (United States) Ian Russell – with San Jose: 2000–2005; with Galaxy: 2007
- (United States) Brian Ching – with Galaxy: 2001; with San Jose: 2003–2005
- (United States) Brian Mullan – with Galaxy: 2001–2002; with San Jose: 2003–2005
- (United States) Craig Waibel – with Galaxy: 2001–2002; with San Jose: 2003–2005
- (United States) Landon Donovan – with San Jose: 2001–2004; with Galaxy: 2005–2014, 2016
- (Turks and Caicos Islands) Gavin Glinton – with Galaxy: 2002–2003, 2006–2007; with San Jose: 2008
- (Venezuela) Alejandro Moreno – with Galaxy: 2002–2004; with San Jose: 2005
- (United States) Todd Dunivant – with San Jose: 2003–2004; with Galaxy: 2005–2006, 2009–2015
- (United States) Chris Aloisi – with Galaxy: 2004; with San Jose: 2005
- (United States) Jovan Kirovski – with Galaxy: 2004–2005, 2009–2011; with San Jose: 2008
- (United States) Ned Grabavoy – with Galaxy: 2004–2006; with San Jose: 2008
- (United States) Alan Gordon – with Galaxy: 2004–2010, 2014–2016; with San Jose: 2011–2014
- (United States) Kelly Gray – with San Jose: 2005, 2008–2009; with Galaxy: 2007
- (Trinidad and Tobago) Cornell Glen – with Galaxy: 2006; with San Jose: 2009–2010
- (United States) Ty Harden – with Galaxy: 2007; with San Jose: 2013–2015
- (United States) Brandon McDonald – with Galaxy: 2008; with San Jose: 2009–2011
- (United States) Dan Gargan – with San Jose: 2013; with Galaxy: 2014–2015
- (United States) David Bingham – with San Jose: 2011–2017; with Galaxy: 2018–2020
- (United States) Matthew Hoppe – with Galaxy: 2014–2015; with San Jose: 2023
- (United States) Preston Judd – with Galaxy: 2022–2023; with San Jose: 2024–present
- (United States) JT Marcinkowski – with San Jose: 2018–2024; with Galaxy: 2025–present

=== Staff ===
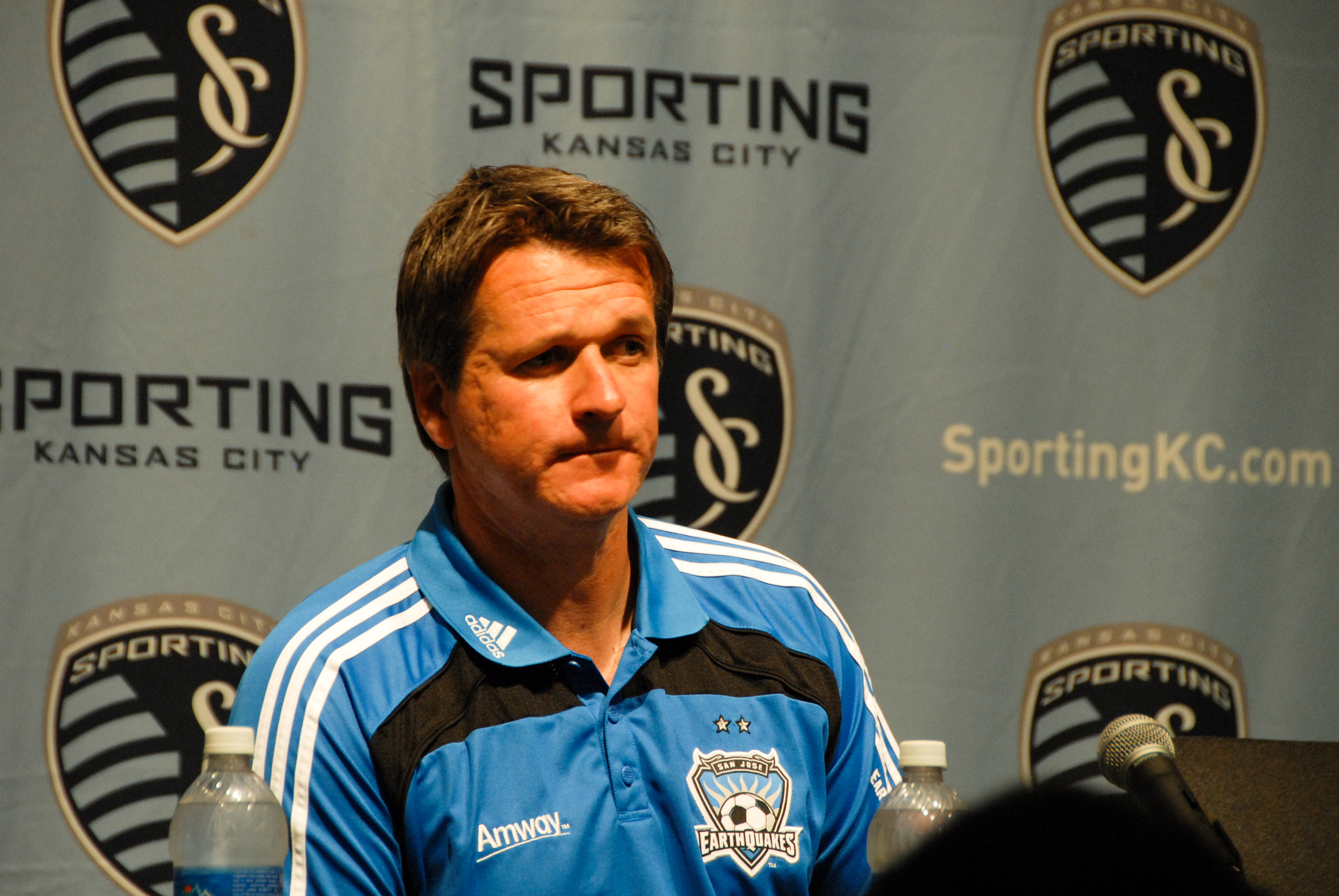
Frank Yallop is the second coach to have coached both teams

- (Germany) Lothar Osiander – coached Galaxy 1996–1997; coached San Jose 1999–2000
- (Canada) Frank Yallop – coached San Jose 2001–2003, 2008–2013; coached Galaxy 2006–2007
- (United States) Dominic Kinnear – coached San Jose 2001–2003, coached San Jose 2004–2005, 2014–2017; coached Galaxy 2017–present, interim coach at Galaxy 2018

== Record ==
=== Games ===
As of June 28, 2025
Including penalty kick wins from 1996 to 1999 seasons

| Competition | LA wins | Draws | SJ wins | LA goals | SJ goals |
|---|---|---|---|---|---|
| MLS regular season | 40 | 18 | 29 | 135 | 119 |
| MLS Cup playoffs | 5 | 1 | 4 | 16 | 12 |
| U.S. Open Cup | 4 | 1 | 1 | 9 | 5 |
| Leagues Cup | 1 | 0 | 0 | 2 | 1 |
| Total | 50 | 20 | 34 | 162 | 137 |

=== Trophies ===
As of December 7, 2024

| Team | MLS Cup | Supporters' Shield | U.S. Open Cup | Champions' Cup | Total |
|---|---|---|---|---|---|
| LA Galaxy | 6 | 4 | 2 | 1 | 13 |
| San Jose Earthquakes | 2 | 2 | 0 | 0 | 4 |

== Results ==
=== MLS regular season ===
| April 28, 1996 | LA Galaxy | 2–1 | SJ Clash | Pasadena, California |
| | Vasquez 26'; Cienfuegos 44' | Report | Bravo 77' | Stadium: Rose Bowl; Attendance: 40,347 |

| May 12, 1996 | SJ Clash | 1–2 | LA Galaxy | San Jose, California |
| | Bravo 75' | Report | Hurtado 9'; Vanney 82' | Stadium: Spartan Stadium; Attendance: 31,728 |

| September 1, 1996 | SJ Earthquakes | 1–1 (1–3 p) | LA Galaxy | San Jose, California |
| | Espinoza 26' | Report | Jones 53' | Stadium: Spartan Stadium; Attendance: 26,184 |

| September 15, 1996 | LA Galaxy | 4–2 | SJ Clash | Pasadena, California |
| | Karapetyan 12'; Armas 32'; Hurtado 78', 83' | Report | Bravo 69'; Wynalda 86' | Stadium: Rose Bowl; Attendance: 14,179 |

| April 12, 1997 | SJ Earthquakes | 4–1 | LA Galaxy | San Jose, California |
| | Kinnear 9'; Doyle 61'; Cerritos 70'; Urbanyi 89' | Report | Cienfuegos 38' | Stadium: Spartan Stadium; Attendance: 17,628 |

| May 18, 1997 | LA Galaxy | 1–1 (3–2 p) | SJ Clash | Pasadena, California |
| | Melo 32' | Report | Lozzano 47' | Stadium: Rose Bowl; Attendance: 10,338 |

| August 17, 1997 | LA Galaxy | 2–3 | SJ Earthquakes | Pasadena, California |
| | Lozzano 15'; Baicher 27', 36' | Report | Machón 48'; Cienfuegos 80' | Stadium: Rose Bowl; Attendance: 22,621 |

| September 21, 1997 | SJ Clash | 2–3 | LA Galaxy | San Jose, California |
| | Cerritos 22'; Lewis 68' | Report | Vasquez 71', 76', 80' | Stadium: Spartan Stadium; Attendance: 20,117 |

| March 21, 1998 | LA Galaxy | 3–3 (3–1 p) | SJ Clash | Pasadena, California |
| | Machón 17'; Hurtado 27'; Melo 48' | Report | Lozzano 43'; Mella 61'; Wynalda 78' | Stadium: Rose Bowl; Attendance: 36,281 |

| June 27, 1998 | SJ Clash | 1–2 | LA Galaxy | San Jose, California |
| | Gough 15' | Report | Caligiuri 64'; Karapetyan 85' | Stadium: Spartan Stadium; Attendance: 22,694 |

| September 16, 1998 | SJ Earthquakes | 0–0 (3–4 p) | LA Galaxy | San Jose, California |
| | | Report | | Stadium: Spartan Stadium; Attendance: 15,893 |

| September 20, 1998 | SJ Clash | 1–0 | LA Galaxy | San Jose, California |
| | Cerritos 41' | Report | | Stadium: Spartan Stadium; Attendance: 11,123 |

| April 3, 1999 | SJ Earthquakes | 1–1 (4–2 p) | LA Galaxy | San Jose, California |
| | Arce 9' | Report | Mathis 86' | Stadium: Spartan Stadium; Attendance: 12,017 |

| April 24, 1999 | LA Galaxy | 1–0 | SJ Clash | Pasadena, California |
| | Caligiuri 58' | Report | | Stadium: Rose Bowl; Attendance: 16,700 |

| August 7, 1999 | SJ Earthquakes | 1–4 | LA Galaxy | San Jose, California |
| | Cloutier 84' | Report | Ibsen 14'; Jones 74'; Cienfuegos 79'; George 82' | Stadium: Spartan Stadium; Attendance: 15,648 |

| September 1, 1999 | LA Galaxy | 3–1 | SJ Clash | Pasadena, California |
| | Myers 2', 58'; Vanney 71' | Report | Sequeira 59' | Stadium: Rose Bowl; Attendance: 8,662 |

| May 17, 2000 | SJ Earthquakes | 0–0 | LA Galaxy | San Jose, California |
| | | Report | | Stadium: Spartan Stadium; Attendance: 12,692 |

| May 27, 2000 | LA Galaxy | 1–1 | SJ Earthquakes | Pasadena, California |
| | Elliott 22' | Report | Solís 32' | Stadium: Rose Bowl; Attendance: 17,831 |

| August 26, 2000 | SJ Earthquakes | 0–3 | LA Galaxy | San Jose, California |
| | | Report | Elliott 29', 61'; Hernández 75' | Stadium: Spartan Stadium; Attendance: 15,683 |

| August 30, 2000 | LA Galaxy | 2–1 | SJ Earthquakes | Pasadena, California |
| | George 40'; Vorbe 93' | Report | Brose 89' | Stadium: Rose Bowl; Attendance: 11,974 |

| April 7, 2001 | LA Galaxy | 2–3 | SJ Earthquakes | Pasadena, California |
| | Victorine 80'; Frye 83' | Report | Dayak 9'; Cerritos 24'; De Rosario 27' | Stadium: Rose Bowl; Attendance: 17,386 |

| June 9, 2001 | SJ Earthquakes | 3–1 | LA Galaxy | San Jose, California |
| | Donovan 31', 91'; Russell 55' | Report | Victorine 68' | Stadium: Spartan Stadium; Attendance: 13,361 |

| July 4, 2002 | LA Galaxy | 2–1 | SJ Earthquakes | Pasadena, California |
| | Ruiz 34', 87' | Report | Lagos 30' | Stadium: Rose Bowl; Attendance: 55,234 |

| July 7, 2002 | SJ Earthquakes | 1–0 | LA Galaxy | San Jose, California |
| | Donovan 35' | Report | | Stadium: Spartan Stadium; Attendance: 12,528 |

| September 14, 2002 | LA Galaxy | 1–0 | SJ Earthquakes | Pasadena, California |
| | Ruiz 94' | Report | | Stadium: Rose Bowl; Attendance: 32,874 |

| September 21, 2002 | SJ Earthquakes | 0–1 | LA Galaxy | San Jose, California |
| | | Report | Ruiz 94' | Stadium: Spartan Stadium; Attendance: 26,229 |

| April 26, 2003 | SJ Earthquakes | 1–0 | LA Galaxy | San Jose, California |
| | Donovan 54' | Report | | Stadium: Spartan Stadium; Attendance: 9,187 |

| June 18, 2003 | LA Galaxy | 1–1 | SJ Earthquakes | Carson, California |
| | Victorine 21' | Report | Walker 63' | Stadium: Home Depot Center; Attendance: 13,867 |

| October 18, 2003 | LA Galaxy | 3–0 | SJ Earthquakes | Carson, California |
| | Moreno 6', 35'; Elliott 61' | Report | | Stadium: Home Depot Center; Attendance: 27,000 |

| October 25, 2003 | SJ Earthquakes | 1–1 | LA Galaxy | San Jose, California |
| | Walker 80' | Report | Moreno 56' | Stadium: Spartan Stadium; Attendance: 16,282 |

| May 22, 2004 | SJ Earthquakes | 4–2 | LA Galaxy | San Jose, California |
| | Ching 45', 48'; Mullan 54'; De Rosario 79' | Report | Herzog 61'; Ngwenya 74' | Stadium: Spartan Stadium; Attendance: 12,207 |

| July 4, 2004 | LA Galaxy | 2–1 | SJ Earthquakes | Carson, California |
| | Ruiz 45', 55' | Report | De Rosario 41' | Stadium: Home Depot Center; Attendance: 27,000 |

| September 11, 2004 | LA Galaxy | 2–1 | SJ Earthquakes | Carson, California |
| | Victorine 36'; Torres 75' | Report | Ekelund 77' | Stadium: Home Depot Center; Attendance: 27,000 |

| September 25, 2004 | SJ Earthquakes | 0–0 | LA Galaxy | San Jose, California |
| | | Report | | Stadium: Spartan Stadium; Attendance: 27,030 |

| May 21, 2005 | LA Galaxy | 2–1 | SJ Earthquakes | Carson, California |
| | Kirovski 39'; Vagenas 77' | Report | Cerritos 69' | Stadium: Home Depot Center; Attendance: 22,207 |

| June 25, 2005 | SJ Earthquakes | 3–0 | LA Galaxy | San Jose, California |
| | Moreno 37'; Umana 65' (o.g.); Marshall 68' (o.g.) | Report | | Stadium: Spartan Stadium; Attendance: 15,917 |

| August 27, 2005 | SJ Earthquakes | 2–1 | LA Galaxy | San Jose, California |
| 17:00 PDT | Moreno 23'; Califf 75' | Report | Donovan 37' | Stadium: Spartan Stadium; Attendance: 24,112 |

| October 15, 2005 | LA Galaxy | 1–3 | SJ Earthquakes | Carson, California |
| 16:00 PDT | Donovan 68' | Report | Chung 42'; De Rosario 45'; Ching 51'; Mullan 77' | Stadium: Home Depot Center; Attendance: 27,000 |

| April 3, 2008 | LA Galaxy | 2–0 | SJ Earthquakes | Carson, California |
| 19:30 PDT | Beckham 9'; Donovan 37' | Report | | Stadium: Home Depot Center; Attendance: 27,000 |

| June 14, 2008 | SJ Earthquakes | 0–3 | LA Galaxy | Oakland, California |
| 19:00 PDT | | Report | Buddle 6', 63', 68' | Stadium: McAfee Coliseum; Attendance: 39,872 |

| August 3, 2008 | SJ Earthquakes | 3–2 | LA Galaxy | Oakland, California |
| 12:00 PDT | Álvarez 8'; Huckerby 40'; Cochrane 90' | Report | Donovan 42'; Buddle 76' | Stadium: McAfee Coliseum; Attendance: 26,701 |

| April 18, 2009 | SJ Earthquakes | 1–1 | LA Galaxy | Santa Clara, California |
| 19:30 PDT | Campos 5' | Report | Jordan 76' | Stadium: Buck Shaw Stadium; Attendance: 15,862 |

| June 20, 2009 | SJ Earthquakes | 2–1 | LA Galaxy | Santa Clara, California |
| 13:30 PDT | Campos 6'; Johnson 54' | Report | Kirovski 65' | Stadium: Buck Shaw Stadium; Attendance: 17,128 |

| October 24, 2009 | LA Galaxy | 2–0 | SJ Earthquakes | Carson, California |
| 19:30 PDT | Burling 24' (o.g.); Donovan 77' | Report | | Stadium: Home Depot Center; Attendance: 27,000 |

| July 22, 2010 | LA Galaxy | 2–2 | SJ Earthquakes | Carson, California |
| 19:30 PDT | Buddle 58'; Donovan 90' | Report | Convey 1'; McDonald 71' | Stadium: Home Depot Center; Attendance: 17,712 |

| August 21, 2010 | SJ Earthquakes | 1–0 | LA Galaxy | Santa Clara, California |
| 13:00 PDT | Wondolowski 4' | Report | | Stadium: Buck Shaw Stadium; Attendance: 10,799 |

| June 25, 2011 | SJ Earthquakes | 0–0 | LA Galaxy | Santa Clara, California |
| 15:30 PDT | | Report | | Stadium: Buck Shaw Stadium; Attendance: 10,872; Referee: Juan Guzmán |

| August 20, 2011 | LA Galaxy | 2–0 | SJ Earthquakes | Carson, California |
| | Keane 21'; Magee 90' | Report | | Stadium: Home Depot Center; Attendance: 27,000; Referee: Andrew Chapin |

| May 23, 2012 | LA Galaxy | 2–3 | SJ Earthquakes | Carson, California |
| | Jiménez 3'; Magee 73' | Report | Lenhart 76'; Stephenson 82'; Gordon 90' | Stadium: Home Depot Center; Attendance: 16,512; Referee: Jair Marrufo |

| June 30, 2012 | SJ Earthquakes | 4–3 | LA Galaxy | Stanford, California |
| | Lenhart 7'; Bernárdez 44'; Cronin 47'; Wondolowski 61' | Report | Beckham 31'; Hernandez 36' (o.g.); Donovan 41' | Stadium: Stanford Stadium; Attendance: 50,391; Referee: Hilario Grajeda |

| October 21, 2012 | SJ Earthquakes | 2–2 | LA Galaxy | Santa Clara, California |
| | Chávez 61'; Wondolowski 73' | Report | Keane 59'; Buddle 69' | Stadium: Buck Shaw Stadium; Attendance: 10,744; Referee: Jair Marrufo |

| June 29, 2013 | SJ Earthquakes | 3–2 | LA Galaxy | Stanford, California |
| | Gordon 68', 93'; Salinas 92' | Report | Sarvas 20'; Jiménez 65' | Stadium: Stanford Stadium; Attendance: 50,028; Referee: Armando Villarreal |

| August 31, 2013 | LA Galaxy | 3–0 | SJ Earthquakes | Carson, California |
| | Donovan 26'; Keane 43', 67' | Report | | Stadium: StubHub Center; Attendance: 27,000; Referee: Kevin Stott |

| October 20, 2013 | LA Galaxy | 0–0 | SJ Earthquakes | Carson, California |
| | | Report | | Stadium: StubHub Center; Attendance: 25,418; Referee: Baldomero Toledo |

| June 28, 2014 | SJ Earthquakes | 0–1 | LA Galaxy | Stanford, California |
| | | Report | Zardes 61' | Stadium: Stanford Stadium; Attendance: 50,006; Referee: Baldomero Toledo |

| August 8, 2014 | LA Galaxy | 2–2 | SJ Earthquakes | Carson, California |
| 19:30 PDT | Zardes 29'; Gonzalez 49' | Report | Wondolowski 18'; Pérez García 31' | Stadium: StubHub Center; Attendance: 19,719; Referee: Alan Kelly |

| September 14, 2014 | SJ Earthquakes | 1–1 | LA Galaxy | Santa Clara, California |
| 12:00 PDT | Wondolowski 65' | Report | Gonzalez 28' | Stadium: Buck Shaw Stadium; Attendance: 10,525; Referee: Sorin Stoica |

| June 27, 2015 | SJ Earthquakes | 3–1 | LA Galaxy | Stanford, California |
| 19:30 PDT | Wondolowski 28'; Goodson 53'; Cato 72' | Report | Juninho 17' | Stadium: Stanford Stadium; Attendance: 50,422 |

| July 17, 2015 | LA Galaxy | 5–2 | SJ Earthquakes | Carson, California |
| 20:00 PDT | Keane 30', 64', 80'; Gerrard 37'; Lletget 90+2' | Report | Amarikwa 22', 25' | Stadium: StubHub Center; Attendance: 27,000; Referee: Alan Kelly |

| August 28, 2015 | SJ Earthquakes | 1–0 | LA Galaxy | San Jose, California |
| 20:00 PDT | Salinas 18' | Report | | Stadium: Avaya Stadium; Attendance: 18,000; Referee: Jose Carlos Rivero |

| March 19, 2016 | LA Galaxy | 3–1 | SJ Earthquakes | Carson, California |
| 19:30 PDT | Zardes 56', 62'; Keane 90+1' | Report | Wondolowski 89' | Stadium: StubHub Center; Attendance: 25,667; Referee: Ismail Elfath |

| May 22, 2016 | LA Galaxy | 1–1 | SJ Earthquakes | Carson, California |
| 16:00 PDT | Wynne 83' (o.g.) | Report | Alashe 87' | Stadium: StubHub Center; Attendance: 27,162; Referee: Kevin Stott |

| June 25, 2016 | SJ Earthquakes | 1–1 | LA Galaxy | Stanford, California |
| 19:00 PDT | Barrett 90' | Report | dos Santos 69' | Stadium: Stanford Stadium; Attendance: 50,816; Referee: Kevin Stott |

| May 27, 2017 | SJ Earthquakes | 2–4 | LA Galaxy | San Jose, California |
| 19:00 PDT | Wondolowski 10'; Hoesen 37' | Report | João Pedro 19' dos Santos 35', 64'; Bernárdez 44' (o.g.) | Stadium: Avaya Stadium; Attendance: 18,000; Referee: Ricardo Salazar |

| July 1, 2017 | SJ Earthquakes | 2–1 | LA Galaxy | Stanford, California |
| 19:30 PDT | Wondolowski 75'; Salinas 90+3' | Report | Van Damme 11' | Stadium: Stanford Stadium; Attendance: 50,617; Referee: Allen Chapman |

| August 27, 2017 | LA Galaxy | 0–3 | SJ Earthquakes | Carson, California |
| 16:00 PDT | | Report | Vako 45+3'; Ureña 80'; Wondolowski 90+2' | Stadium: StubHub Center; Attendance: 19,237; Referee: Chris Penso |

| May 26, 2018 | LA Galaxy | 1–0 | SJ Earthquakes | Carson, California |
| 20:00 PDT | Alessandrini 82' | Report | | Stadium: StubHub Center; Attendance: 23,118; Referee: Kevin Stott |

| July 1, 2018 | SJ Earthquakes | 3–3 | LA Galaxy | Stanford, California |
| 19:00 PDT | Wondolowski 15', 69'; Vako 39' | Report | Ibrahimovic 1', 25'; Alessandrini 20' | Stadium: Stanford Stadium; Attendance: 50,743; Referee: Jose Carlos Rivero |

| June 29, 2019 | SJ Earthquakes | 3–0 | LA Galaxy | Stanford, California |
| 19:00 PDT | Vako 11'; Salinas 82'; Thompson 85' | Report | | Stadium: Stanford Stadium; Attendance: 50,850; Referee: Kevin Stott |

| July 12, 2019 | LA Galaxy | 1–3 | SJ Earthquakes | Carson, California |
| 20:00 PDT | Feltscher 2' | Report | Vako 61'; Hoesen 63'; Yueill 85' | Stadium: Dignity Health Sports Park; Attendance: 22,508; Referee: Nima Saghafi |

| August 29, 2020 | LA Galaxy | 3–2 | SJ Earthquakes | Carson, California |
| 19:30 PDT | Steres 33'; Pavón 72' (pen.); Lletget 82' | Report | Vako 11'; Cowell 59' | Stadium: Dignity Health Sports Park; Attendance: 0 (Note: No fans due to the COVID-19 pandemic restrictions.); Referee: Victor Rivas |

| September 13, 2020 | SJ Earthquakes | 0–0 | LA Galaxy | San Jose, California |
| 20:00 PDT | | Report | | Stadium: Earthquakes Stadium; Attendance: 0 Referee: Timothy Ford |

| October 3, 2020 | SJ Earthquakes | 2–1 | LA Galaxy | San Jose, California |
| 19:30 PDT | López 42'; Ríos 82' | Report | Lletget 4' | Stadium: Earthquakes Stadium; Attendance: 0 Referee: Robert Sibiga |

| October 14, 2020 | LA Galaxy | 0–4 | SJ Earthquakes | Carson, California |
| 19:30 PDT | | Report | Lima 44', 90+3'; Ríos 52'; Thompson 76' | Stadium: Dignity Health Sports Park; Referee: Alex Chilowicz |

| May 29, 2021 | LA Galaxy | 1–0 | SJ Earthquakes | Carson, California |
| 16:00 PDT | Beason 70' (o.g.) | Report | | Stadium: Dignity Health Sports Park; Referee: Joe Dickerson |

| June 26, 2021 | SJ Earthquakes | 1–3 | LA Galaxy | San Jose, California |
| 20:00 PDT | Cowell 82' | Report | Chicharito 11', 50'; Jungwirth 76' (o.g.) | Stadium: PayPal Park; Attendance: 18,000; Referee: Armando Villarreal |

| August 20, 2021 | LA Galaxy | 1–2 | SJ Earthquakes | Carson, California |
| 19:30 PST | Vázquez 65' | Report | Ebobisse 52'; Hämäläinen 71' (o.g.) | Stadium: Dignity Health Sports Park; Attendance: 17,568; Referee: Armando Villarreal |

| July 13, 2022 | LA Galaxy | 2–3 | SJ Earthquakes | Carson, California |
| 18:30 PDT | Joveljić 48', 88' | Report | Espinoza 13' (pen.); Ebobisse 14'; López 40' | Stadium: Dignity Health Sports Park; Attendance: 18,453; Referee: Allen Chapman |

| September 24, 2022 | SJ Earthquakes | 2–3 | LA Galaxy | Stanford, California |
| 19:00 PST | Espinoza 74' (pen.); Nathan 90+4' | Report | Chicharito 12', 69'; Brugman 42' | Stadium: Stanford Stadium; Attendance: 44,200; Referee: Alex Chilowicz |

| May 14, 2023 | LA Galaxy | 2–1 | SJ Earthquakes | Carson, California |
| 18:30 PDT | Cáceres 60'; Joveljić 90+1' | Report | Bouda 90+4' | Stadium: Dignity Health Sports Park; Attendance: 16,035; Referee: Joe Dickerson |

| July 1, 2023 | SJ Earthquakes | 2–2 | LA Galaxy | Stanford, California |
| 19:30 PDT | Espinoza 81'; Skahan 42' | Report | Edwards 31'; Judd 47' | Stadium: Stanford Stadium; Attendance: 42,823; Referee: Ramy Touchan |

| August 30, 2023 | SJ Earthquakes | 2–3 | LA Galaxy | San Jose, California |
| 19:30 PDT | Calegari 29' (o.g.); Ebobisse 31' | Report | Boyd 16'; Puig 50'; Joveljić 61' (pen.) | Stadium: PayPal Park; Attendance: 16,224; Referee: Lukasz Szpala |

| March 2, 2024 | SJ Earthquakes | 1–3 | LA Galaxy | San Jose, California |
| 19:30 PST | Judd 70' | Report | Paintsil 18'; Joveljić 43'; Puig 48' | Stadium: PayPal Park; Attendance: 18,000; Referee: Cristian Campo Hernández |

| April 21, 2024 | LA Galaxy | 4–3 | SJ Earthquakes | Carson, California |
| 17:15 PDT | Gabriel Pec 14'; Paintsil 24' (pen.); Yoshida 30'; Puig 56' | Report | Rodrigues 32'; Kikanović 58'; Ebobisse 72' | Stadium: Dignity Health Sports Park; Attendance: 25,335; Referee: Rosendo Mendoza |

| June 29, 2024 | SJ Earthquakes | 0–3 | LA Galaxy | Stanford, California |
| 19:30 PDT | | Report | Paintsil 37'; Joveljić 72'; Cuevas 90+1' | Stadium: Stanford Stadium; Attendance: 40,844; Referee: Guido Gonzales Jr. |

| May 28, 2025 | LA Galaxy | 0–1 | SJ Earthquakes | Carson, California |
| 19:00 PDT | | Report | Bouda 74' | Stadium: Dignity Health Sports Park; Attendance: 15,345; Referee: Alexis Da Silva |

| June 28, 2025 | SJ Earthquakes | 1–1 | LA Galaxy | Stanford, California |
| 19:30 PDT | Leroux 16' | Report | Reus 70' | Stadium: Stanford Stadium; Attendance: 42,881; Referee: Jair Marrufo |

| July 25, 2026 | SJ Earthquakes | 1-1 | LA Galaxy | Stanford, California |
| 19:30 PDT | Roberts 62' | Report | Paintsil 13' | Stadium: Stanford Stadium; Attendance: 43,026; Referee: Armando Villarreal |

| August 19, 2026 | LA Galaxy | 1-0 | SJ Earthquakes | Carson, California |
| 19:30 PDT | Sanabria (yellow card) 45' (yellow-red card) , Paintsil 79' | Report | | Stadium: Dignity Health Sports Park; Attendance: 15,435; Referee: Ramy Touchan |

=== MLS Cup playoffs ===
| September 26, 1996 Conference semifinal leg 1 | SJ Clash | 1–0 | LA Galaxy | San Jose, California |
| | Ianni 36' | Report | | Stadium: Spartan Stadium; Attendance: 17,209; Referee: Kevin Stott |

| September 29, 1996 Conference semifinal leg 2 | LA Galaxy | 2–0 | SJ Earthquakes | Pasadena, California |
| | Hurtado 90'; Fraser 84' | Report | | Stadium: Rose Bowl; Attendance: 27,833; Referee: Joshua Patlak |

| October 2, 1996 Conference semifinal playoff | LA Galaxy | 2–0 | SJ Clash | Pasadena, California |
| | Hurtado 31'; Cienfuegos 36' | Report | | Stadium: Rose Bowl; Attendance: 30,231; Referee: Esse Baharmast |

| October 21, 2001 MLS Cup | SJ Earthquakes | 2–1 | LA Galaxy | Columbus, Ohio |
| | Donovan 43'; De Rosario 96' | Report | Hernandez 21' | Stadium: Columbus Crew Stadium; Attendance: 21,626; Referee: Kevin Stott |

| November 1, 2003 Conference semifinal leg 1 | LA Galaxy | 2–0 | SJ Earthquakes | Carson, California |
| | Victorine 59'; Ruiz 62' | Report | | Stadium: Home Depot Center; Attendance: 20,201 |

| November 9, 2003 Conference semifinal leg 2 | SJ Earthquakes | 5–2 | LA Galaxy | San Jose, California |
| | Agoos 21'; Donovan 35'; Walker 50'; Roner 90'; Faria 96' | Report | Ruiz 7'; Vagenas 13' | Stadium: Spartan Stadium; Attendance: 14,145; Referee: Alex Prus |

| October 23, 2005 Conference semifinal leg 1 | LA Galaxy | 3–1 | SJ Earthquakes | Carson, California |
| | Gomez 13'; Donovan 39', 87' | Report | Clark 68' | Stadium: Home Depot Center; Attendance: 17,466; Referee: Abiodun Okulaja |

| October 29, 2005 Conference semifinal leg 2 | SJ Earthquakes | 1–1 | LA Galaxy | San Jose, California |
| | Ching 42' | Report | Grabavoy 67' | Stadium: Spartan Stadium; Attendance: 17,824; Referee: Alex Prus |

| November 4, 2012 Conference semifinal leg 1 | LA Galaxy | 0–1 | SJ Earthquakes | Carson, California |
| 18:00 PST | | Report | Bernardez 90' | Stadium: Home Depot Center; Attendance: 27,000; Referee: Ricardo Salazar |

| November 7, 2012 Conference semifinal leg 2 | SJ Earthquakes | 1–3 | LA Galaxy | Santa Clara, California |
| 20:00 PST | Gordon 82' | Report | Keane 21', 34'; Magee 39' | Stadium: Buck Shaw Stadium; Attendance: 10,744; Referee: Kevin Stott |

=== U.S. Open Cup ===
| August 9, 2000 Quarterfinal | LA Galaxy | 2–0 | SJ Earthquakes | Fullerton, California |
| | Cienfuegos 77'; George 81' | Report | | Stadium: Titan Stadium; Attendance: 4,345; Referee: Gus St. Silva |

| July 24, 2001 Quarterfinal | SJ Earthquakes | 1–1 (9–10 p) | LA Galaxy | San Francisco, California |
| | Agogo 81' | Report | Elliott 73' | Stadium: Negoesco Stadium; Attendance: 1,881; Referee: Michael Kennedy |
| | Penalties |
| | Agoos (penalty scored); Lagos (penalty scored); Corrales (penalty scored); Cerritos (penalty scored); De Rosario (penalty scored); Agogo (penalty scored); Ibsen (penalty scored); Russell (penalty scored); Conrad (penalty scored); Barrett (penalty missed) | | (penalty scored) Vanney; (penalty scored) Vagenas; (penalty scored) Elliott; (penalty scored) Cienfuegos; (penalty scored) Hendrickson; (penalty scored) Waibel; (penalty scored) Caligiuri; (penalty scored) Jones; (penalty scored) Bardales; (penalty scored) Califf |

| August 7, 2002 Quarterfinal | SJ Earthquakes | 0–1 | LA Galaxy | San Jose, California |
| | | Report | Ruiz 101' | Stadium: Spartan Stadium; Attendance: 6,481; Referee: Terry Vaughn |

| August 24, 2005 Quarterfinal | SJ Earthquakes | 1–2 | LA Galaxy | San Jose, California |
| | Cerritos 76' | Report | Gómez 5', 31' | Stadium: Spartan Stadium; Attendance: 5,134; Referee: Terry Vaughn |

| July 1, 2015 Fifth round | SJ Earthquakes | 0–1 | LA Galaxy | San Jose, California |
| 19:30 PT | | Report | Villarreal 6' | Stadium: Avaya Stadium; Attendance: 13,329; Referee: Allen Chapman |

| July 10, 2017 Quarterfinal | SJ Earthquakes | 3–2 | LA Galaxy | San Jose, California |
| 19:30 PT | Wondolowski 16', 51'; Hoesen 62' | Report | Van Damme 3'; Tarbell 84' (o.g.) | Stadium: Avaya Stadium; Attendance: 14,056; Referee: Allen Chapman |

=== Leagues Cup ===
| July 31, 2024 Group stage | SJ Earthquakes | 1–2 | LA Galaxy | San Jose, California |
| 19:30 PDT | Ebobisse 75' | Report | Fagúndez 41'; Berry 89' | Stadium: PayPal Park; Attendance: 12,554; Referee: Lukasz Szpala |

== Winners ==
Each season, a cup is awarded to the team that won the most points in the California Clasico during the MLS regular season. Between 1996 and 1999, matches ending in draws were culminated in a penalty shoot-out with the winner of the shootout gaining one point while the losing team left with no points. This system was abolished starting with the 2000 season; a draw awarded each team 1 point.

Key
| † | Tie broken on goal difference |

| Season | Winner | Points comparison |
|---|---|---|
| 1996 | Los Angeles Galaxy | 10–0 |
| 1997 | San Jose Clash | 6–4 |
| 1998 | Los Angeles Galaxy | 5–3 |
| 1999 | Los Angeles Galaxy | 9–1 |
| 2000 | Los Angeles Galaxy | 8–2 |
| 2001 | San Jose Earthquakes | 6–0 |
| 2002 | Los Angeles Galaxy | 9–3 |
| 2003 | Los Angeles Galaxy | 5–5 (5–3)† |
| 2004 | Los Angeles Galaxy | 7–4 |
| 2005 | San Jose Earthquakes | 9–3 |
| 2008 | Los Angeles Galaxy | 6–3 |
| 2009 | Los Angeles Galaxy | 4–4 (4–3)† |
| 2010 | San Jose Earthquakes | 4–1 |
| 2011 | Los Angeles Galaxy | 4–1 |
| 2012 | San Jose Earthquakes | 7–1 |
| 2013 | Los Angeles Galaxy | 4–4 (5–3)† |
| 2014 | Los Angeles Galaxy | 5–2 |
| 2015 | San Jose Earthquakes | 6–3 |
| 2016 | Los Angeles Galaxy | 4–1 |
| 2017 | San Jose Earthquakes | 6–3 |
| 2018 | Los Angeles Galaxy | 4–1 |
| 2019 | San Jose Earthquakes | 6–0 |
| 2020 | San Jose Earthquakes | 7–4 |
| 2021 | Los Angeles Galaxy | 6–3 |
| 2022 | Tied | 3–3 (5–5) |
| 2023 | Los Angeles Galaxy | 7–1 |
| 2024 | Los Angeles Galaxy | 9–0 |
| 2025 | San Jose Earthquakes | 4–1 |

== Popular culture ==
On October 13, 2013, the California Clasico was highlighted on the TV series, MLS Insider, explaining the history of the rivalry from the different perspectives of players such as Chris Wondolowski and Landon Donovan.

== See also ==
- Northern California – Southern California rivalry
- Dodgers–Giants rivalry
- Angels–Athletics rivalry
- 49ers–Rams rivalry
- Lakers–Warriors rivalry
- Kings–Sharks rivalry
