= Lucas Sanabria =

Lucas Sanabria is the name of:

- Lucas Sanabria (Paraguayan footballer) (born 1999)
- Lucas Sanabria (Uruguayan footballer) (born 2003)
