= Carlos Gruezo (footballer, born 1975) =

Ecuadorian footballer

Personal information
- Full name: Carlos Armando Gruezo Quiñónez
- Date of birth: 18 September 1975 (age 51)
- Place of birth: Quinindé, Ecuador
- Height: 1.82 m (5 ft 11 1/2 in)
- Position: Forward

Team information
- Current team: São Paulo (assistant)

Senior career*
Years	Team	Apps	(Gls)
1993–1994	Barcelona SC		
1995	Aucas		
1996	Barcelona SC		
1997–2001	ESPOLI		
2001	UDJ Quinindé		
2002	ESPOLI		
2003	El Nacional		
2004–2005	Deportivo Cuenca		
2005	LDU Portoviejo		
2006	Deportivo Quito		

International career
1995	Ecuador U20	3	(2)
1995–1996	Ecuador U23	9	(3)
1998	Ecuador	1	(0)

Managerial career
- 2010–2013: Barcelona SC (assistant)
- 2010: Barcelona SC (interim)
- 2014–2015: LDU Quito (assistant)
- 2015–2016: Santos Laguna (assistant)
- 2016–2017: Independiente Medellín (assistant)
- 2018: Cerro Porteño (assistant)
- 2018–2021: Lanús (assistant)
- 2022–2024: LDU Quito (assistant)
- 2024–: São Paulo (assistant)
- * Club domestic league appearances and goals

Carlos Armando Gruezo Quiñónez (born September 18, 1975 in Quinindé) is a retired football forward from Ecuador, who earned one cap for the Ecuador national team during his career. His only appearance came on 14 October 1998 when Ecuador lost 5–1 in a friendly against Brazil, and Gruezo was a second-half substitute for Ariel Graziani. He is the father of Carlos Armando Gruezo Arboleda.

== Honors ==
=== Club ===
- Deportivo Cuenca
  - Serie A de Ecuador: 2004
