= Beau Leroux =

American soccer player (born 2003)

Personal information
- Full name: Beau Matthew Lovie Leroux
- Date of birth: August 31, 2003 (age 23)
- Place of birth: San Jose, California, U.S.
- Height: 6 ft 0 in (1.83 m)
- Position: Midfielder

Team information
- Current team: San Jose Earthquakes
- Number: 34

Youth career
- Santa Cruz Breakers
- Santa Teresa High School

College career
Years	Team	Apps	(Gls)
2021–2023	San Jose State Spartans	43	(7)

Senior career*
Years	Team	Apps	(Gls)
2022	Project 51O	2	(0)
2024	The Town FC	22	(4)
2025–	San Jose Earthquakes	33	(5)
- * Club domestic league appearances and goals as of October 18, 2025

Beau Matthew Lovie Leroux (born August 31, 2003) is an American professional soccer player who plays as a midfielder for Major League Soccer club San Jose Earthquakes.

== Early life ==
Leroux was born in San Jose, California, to an American father and Taiwanese mother. He attended Santa Teresa High School and played for the school's soccer team. Leroux played club soccer with Santa Cruz Breakers.

== College career ==
In 2021, Leroux attended San Jose State University, where he made 43 appearances over three seasons, scoring seven goals and tallying three assists. He was named WAC All-Freshman Team in 2021 and United Soccer Coaches All-Region Team and All-WAC First Team in 2022.

During his 2022 season, Leroux also appeared in the USL League Two with Project 51O, making two appearances.

== Club career ==
On December 19, 2023, Leroux was selected 42nd overall in the 2024 MLS SuperDraft by San Jose Earthquakes. He joined San Jose's MLS Next Pro side The Town FC on March 15, 2024, ahead of their 2024 season. On February 21, 2025, Leroux signed with the San Jose Earthquakes MLS team. He made his debut for the club the next day, starting in a 4–0 victory over Real Salt Lake, where he provided an assist.

== Career statistics ==
As of match played October 18, 2025

Appearances and goals by club, season and competition
Club	Season	League			National cup (Note: Includes U.S. Open Cup)		League cup (Note: Includes MLS Cup playoffs)		Continental		Other		Total	
Club	Season	Division	Apps	Goals	Apps	Goals	Apps	Goals	Apps	Goals	Apps	Goals	Apps	Goals
The Town FC	2024	MLS Next Pro	22	4	—		—		—		—		22	4
San Jose Earthquakes	2025	MLS	33	5	2	0	—		—		—		35	5
Career total			55	9	2	0	0	0	0	0	0	0	57	9
