= Max Floriani =

American soccer player (born 2003)

Personal information
- Date of birth: February 6, 2003 (age 23)
- Place of birth: Gurnee, Illinois, U.S.
- Position: Defender

Team information
- Current team: San Jose Earthquakes
- Number: 25

College career
Years	Team	Apps	(Gls)
2022–2024	Saint Louis Billikens	56	(4)

Senior career*
Years	Team	Apps	(Gls)
2025–	San Jose Earthquakes	14	(0)
- * Club domestic league appearances and goals as of 11 February 2026

Max Floriani (born February 6, 2003) is an American professional soccer player who plays as a defender for Major League Soccer club San Jose Earthquakes.

== Career ==
=== Saint Louis Billikens ===
Floriani played for Saint Louis Billikens for three seasons from 2022 until 2024, he played 56 games with 53 starts for the Billikens during his college career.

=== San Jose Earthquakes ===
Floriani was selected with the No. 2 overall selection by the San Jose Earthquakes in the 2025 MLS SuperDraft on December 20, 2024. On April 19, 2025, Floriani made his MLS debut for the Earthquakes in a 5–3 loss to Sporting Kansas City. Floriani played three minutes in the match. On April 26, Floriani made his first MLS start in a 2–1 loss to the Columbus Crew. Floriani played 90 minutes in the match.
