= Hernán López (footballer) =

Argentine footballer (born 2000)

Personal information
- Full name: Hernán López Muñoz
- Date of birth: 7 September 2000 (age 26)
- Place of birth: Villa del Parque, Argentina
- Height: 1.68 m (5 ft 6 in)
- Position: Attacking midfielder

Team information
- Current team: Argentinos Juniors
- Number: 23

Youth career
- Pacífico Villa del Parque
- Juventud de Devoto
- Agronomía
- Cultural de Tapiales
- Argentinos Juniors
- 2014–2019: River Plate

Senior career*
Years	Team	Apps	(Gls)
2019–2024	River Plate	1	(1)
2021–2022	→ Central Córdoba SdE (loan)	29	(4)
2023	→ Godoy Cruz (loan)	36	(5)
2024	Godoy Cruz	10	(2)
2024–	San Jose Earthquakes	29	(6)
2025	→ The Town FC (loan)	2	(1)
2025–	→ Argentinos Juniors (loan)	30	(8)
- * Club domestic league appearances and goals as of 17:27, 10 July 2026 (UTC)

Hernán López Muñoz (born 7 September 2000) is an Argentine professional footballer who plays as an attacking midfielder or right winger for Argentine Primera División club Argentinos Juniors, on loan from San Jose Earthquakes.

== Career ==
López played for Dublin United Soccer League (DUSL), Juventud de Devoto, Agronomía, Cultural de Tapiales and Argentinos Juniors at youth level in his hometown Dublin, California. He lived in Positano Parkway, Dublin, before joining the academy ranks of Primera División side River Plate in 2014; where he'd notably win the Generation Adidas Cup in back-to-back years from 2016. His breakthrough into senior football came on the final day of the 2018–19 campaign, with Marcelo Gallardo selecting the midfielder off the bench in a Primera División fixture versus Tigre on 7 April 2019. He came on with thirty-one minutes left in place of Jorge Carrascal, prior to scoring for 2–2 with four minutes remaining; though Tigre went on to win.

On 25 April 2024, López signed with Major League Soccer side San Jose Earthquakes.

On 5 July 2025, López returned to Argentina to join Argentinos Juniors on loan for 18 months with an option to buy.

== Personal life ==
López is a great-nephew of the Argentine international footballer Diego Maradona. His father, Sergio Daniel López Maradona, was also a professional footballer with Argentinos Juniors. His paternal great-grandfather Diego Maradona "Chitoro" (1927–2015), who worked at a chemicals factory, was of Guaraní (Indigenous) and Spanish (Galician) descent, and his paternal great-grandmother Dalma Salvadora Franco, "Doña Tota" (1929–2011), was of Italian descent.

== Career statistics ==
As of 20 October 2024

Appearances and goals by club, season and competition
Club	Season	League			National cup (Note: Includes Copa Argentina, U.S. Open Cup)		Continental		Other		Total	
Club	Season	Division	Apps	Goals	Apps	Goals	Apps	Goals	Apps	Goals	Apps	Goals
River Plate	2018–19	Argentine Primera División	1	1	0	0	0	0	—		1	1
River Plate	2019–20	Argentine Primera División	3	0	0	0	0	0	—		3	0
River Plate	Total		4	1	0	0	0	0	—		4	1
Central Córdoba (SE) (loan)	2021	Argentine Primera División	9	0	—		—		—		9	0
Central Córdoba (SE) (loan)	2022	Argentine Primera División	20	4	—		—		—		20	4
Central Córdoba (SE) (loan)	Total		29	4	—		—		—		29	4
Godoy Cruz (loan)	2023	Argentine Primera División	36	5	2	0	—		—		38	5
Godoy Cruz	2024	Argentine Primera División	10	2	1	0	2 (Note: Appearances in Copa Libertadores)	0	—		13	2
Godoy Cruz	Godoy Cruz total		46	7	3	0	2	0	—		51	7
San Jose Earthquakes	2024	Major League Soccer	24	6	2	1	—		4 (Note: Appearances in Leagues Cup)	2	30	9
Career total			103	18	5	1	2	0	4	2	114	21
