= Vítor Costa (footballer) =

Brazilian footballer (born 1994)

Personal information
- Full name: Vítor Costa de Brito
- Date of birth: 1 July 1994 (age 32)
- Place of birth: Valente, Brazil
- Height: 1.82 m (6 ft 0 in)
- Position: Left-back

Team information
- Current team: San Jose Earthquakes
- Number: 87

Senior career*
| Years | Team | Apps | (Gls) |
| 2015 | Bahia | 17 | (2) |
| 2016–2020 | Inter de Lages | 0 | (0) |
| 2015–2016 | → Avaí (loan) | 20 | (0) |
| 2016–2018 | → Arouca (loan) | 55 | (0) |
| 2018–2019 | → Aves (loan) | 30 | (1) |
| 2019–2020 | → Lens (loan) | 5 | (0) |
| 2021 | CSA | 21 | (0) |
| 2021–2024 | Marítimo | 72 | (2) |
| 2024– | San Jose Earthquakes | 54 | (3) |
- * Club domestic league appearances and goals as of 11 February 2026

Vítor Costa de Brito (born 1 July 1994) is a Brazilian professional footballer who plays as a left-back for Major League Soccer club San Jose Earthquakes.

== Career ==
On 9 July 2021, Costa joined Portuguese Primeira Liga club Marítimo.

On 7 February 2024, Costa signed a two-year contract, with an option for a further year, with Major League Soccer club San Jose Earthquakes.

== Career statistics ==
=== Club ===
As of 29 March 2024

Appearances and goals by club, season and competition
| Club | Season | League | | | State League | | Cup | | Continental | | Other | | Total | |
| Club | Season | Division | Apps | Goals | Apps | Goals | Apps | Goals | Apps | Goals | Apps | Goals | Apps | Goals |
|---|---|---|---|---|---|---|---|---|---|---|---|---|---|---|
| Bahia | 2015 | Série B | 17 | 2 | — | | — | | 0 | 0 | — | | 17 | 2 |
| Avaí (loan) | 2016 | Série B | 1 | 0 | 15 (Note: Appearance(s) in Campeonato Catarinense) | 0 | 4 | 0 | — | | 0 | 0 | 20 | 0 |
| Arouca (loan) | 2016-17 | Primeira Liga | 8 | 0 | — | | — | | 0 | 0 | 3 (Note: Appearance(s) in Taça da Liga) | 0 | 11 | 0 |
| Arouca (loan) | 2017-18 | Liga Portugal 2 | 38 | 0 | — | | 1 | 0 | — | | 2 | 0 | 41 | 0 |
| Arouca (loan) | Total | | 46 | 0 | — | | 1 | 0 | 0 | 0 | 5 | 0 | 52 | 0 |
| Aves (loan) | 2018-19 | Primeira Liga | 25 | 1 | — | | 2 | 0 | — | | 3 | 0 | 30 | 1 |
| Lens (loan) | 2019-20 | Ligue 2 | 1 | 0 | — | | 2 | 0 | — | | 2 (Note: Appearance(s) in Coupe de la Ligue) | 0 | 5 | 0 |
| Lens II (loan) | 2019-20 | Championnat National 2 | 1 | 0 | — | | — | | — | | — | | 1 | 0 |
| CSA | 2021 | Série B | 7 | 0 | 4 (Note: Appearance(s) in Campeonato Alagoano) | 0 | 2 | 0 | — | | 8 (Note: Appearance(s) in Copa do Nordeste) | 0 | 21 | 0 |
| Marítimo | 2021-22 | Primeira Liga | 31 | 0 | — | | 1 | 0 | — | | 0 | 0 | 32 | 0 |
| Marítimo | 2022-23 | Primeira Liga | 28 | 2 | — | | 1 | 0 | — | | 5 (Note: Three appearances in Taça da Liga, Two appearances in relegation play-offs) | 0 | 34 | 2 |
| Marítimo | 2023-24 | Liga Portugal 2 | 13 | 0 | — | | 0 | 0 | — | | 1 | 0 | 14 | 0 |
| Marítimo | Total | | 72 | 2 | — | | 2 | 0 | — | | 6 | 0 | 80 | 2 |
| San Jose Earthquakes | 2024 | MLS | 5 | 2 | — | | — | | — | | — | | 5 | 2 |
| Career Total | | | 175 | 7 | 19 | 0 | 13 | 0 | 0 | 0 | 24 | 0 | 231 | 7 |

== Honours ==
CSA

- Campeonato Alagoano: 2021
