= Carlos Gruezo (footballer, born 1995) =

Ecuadorian footballer (born 1995)

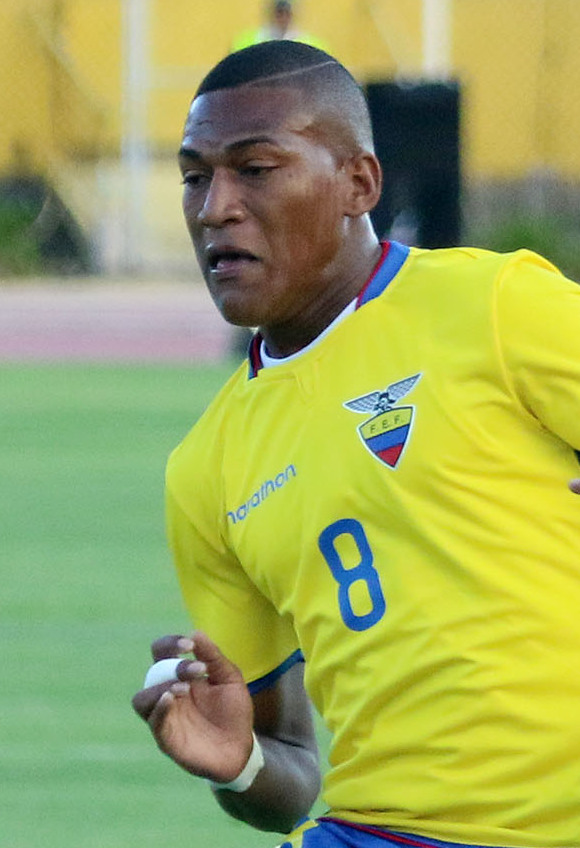
- Gruezo with Ecuador in 2015

Personal information
- Full name: Carlos Armando Gruezo Arboleda
- Date of birth: 19 April 1995 (age 31)
- Place of birth: Santo Domingo, Ecuador
- Height: 1.73 m (5 ft 8 in)
- Positions: Midfielder; centre-back; sweeper

Youth career
- Unión Deportiva Juvenil
- 2008: LDU Quito
- 2009: Defensor Sporting
- 2010: Independiente DV

Senior career*
| Years | Team | Apps | (Gls) |
| 2011 | Independiente DV | 4 | (0) |
| 2012–2014 | Barcelona SC | 77 | (3) |
| 2014–2016 | VfB Stuttgart | 18 | (1) |
| 2016–2019 | FC Dallas | 98 | (3) |
| 2019–2023 | FC Augsburg | 69 | (0) |
| 2023–2024 | San Jose Earthquakes | 47 | (0) |
| 2025 | L.D.U. Quito | 23 | (1) |
| 2026 | Santos Laguna | 14 | (1) |

International career^{‡}
| 2011 | Ecuador U17 | 13 | (1) |
| 2013 | Ecuador U20 | 9 | (0) |
| 2014– | Ecuador | 64 | (1) |
- * Club domestic league appearances and goals as of 19 August 2025 ‡ National team caps and goals as of 19 November 2024

Carlos Armando Gruezo Arboleda (Spanish pronunciation: [ˈkaɾlos ˈɣɾweso]; born 19 April 1995) is an Ecuadorian professional footballer who plays as a defensive midfielder or central defender for the Ecuador national team. He is the son of Carlos Armando Gruezo Quiñónez.

He is described by FIFA's official website as "a technically adept holding midfielder and a precise passer of the ball".

== Club career ==
Gruezo began his career with Independiente del Valle before joining Ecuadorian club Barcelona SC.

Gruezo went on trial for VfB Stuttgart in their pre season friendlies in South Africa. On 30 January 2014, he signed a four-year contract with Stuttgart. He scored his first goal for the club in a 4–1 victory over Freiburg on 28 November 2014, becoming the first Ecuadorian to score in the Bundesliga. In 2015 however, he lost his spot in the starting lineup and only had a few more appearances for Stuttgart.

He moved to FC Dallas on 23 January 2016.

On 2 July 2019, Gruezo returned to Germany, joining FC Augsburg on a five-year deal.

On 31 January 2023, Gruezo returned to the United States, joining San Jose Earthquakes on a three-year deal. San Jose and Gruezo mutually agreed to terminate his contract with the club on 4 February 2025 and joined L.D.U. Quito soon after.

== International career ==
Gruezo played for the Ecuador U17 national team at the 2011 FIFA U-17 World Cup and at the 2013 South American Youth Championship.

He made his debut for the senior national team on 17 May 2014, coming in as a second-half substitute for Christian Noboa against the Netherlands. On 6 June, he was named in Ecuador's squad for the 2014 FIFA World Cup.

Gruezo was selected in the 23 player Ecuador squad for the Copa América Centenario.

Gruezo was selected in the 23-man Ecuador squad for the 2019 Copa América, released on 20 May 2019.

Gruezo was selected in the 28 player Ecuador squad for the 2021 Copa América.

Gruezo was named in the Ecuadorian squad for the 2022 FIFA World Cup

Gruezo was called up to the final 26-man Ecuador squad for the 2024 Copa América.

== Personal life ==
In February 2019, Gruezo obtained a U.S. green card, which qualified him as a domestic player for MLS roster purposes.

== Career statistics ==
=== Club ===
As of match played on 19 October 2024

Appearances and goals by club, season and competition
| Club | Season | League | | | Cup | | Continental | | Other | | Total | |
| Club | Season | Division | Apps | Goals | Apps | Goals | Apps | Goals | Apps | Goals | Apps | Goals |
|---|---|---|---|---|---|---|---|---|---|---|---|---|
| Independiente del Valle | 2011 | Ecuadorian Serie A | 4 | 0 | — | | 0 | 0 | — | | 4 | 0 |
| Barcelona SC | 2012 | Ecuadorian Serie A | 39 | 1 | — | | 1 | 0 | — | | 40 | 1 |
| Barcelona SC | 2013 | Ecuadorian Serie A | 38 | 2 | — | | 3 | 0 | — | | 41 | 2 |
| Barcelona SC | Total | | 77 | 3 | — | | 4 | 0 | — | | 81 | 3 |
| VfB Stuttgart | 2013–14 | Bundesliga | 8 | 0 | 0 | 0 | — | | — | | 8 | 0 |
| VfB Stuttgart | 2014–15 | Bundesliga | 8 | 1 | 0 | 0 | — | | — | | 8 | 1 |
| VfB Stuttgart | 2015–16 | Bundesliga | 2 | 0 | 1 | 0 | — | | — | | 3 | 0 |
| VfB Stuttgart | Total | | 18 | 1 | 1 | 0 | — | | — | | 19 | 1 |
| FC Dallas | 2016 | MLS | 27 | 0 | 3 | 0 | — | | 2 | 0 | 32 | 0 |
| FC Dallas | 2017 | MLS | 31 | 0 | 1 | 0 | 6 | 1 | — | | 38 | 1 |
| FC Dallas | 2018 | MLS | 31 | 2 | 1 | 1 | 2 | 0 | 1 | 0 | 35 | 3 |
| FC Dallas | 2019 | MLS | 9 | 1 | 0 | 0 | — | | — | | 9 | 1 |
| FC Dallas | Total | | 98 | 3 | 5 | 1 | 8 | 1 | 3 | 0 | 114 | 5 |
| Augsburg | 2019–20 | Bundesliga | 11 | 0 | 1 | 0 | — | | — | | 12 | 0 |
| Augsburg | 2020–21 | Bundesliga | 28 | 0 | 2 | 0 | — | | — | | 30 | 0 |
| Augsburg | 2021–22 | Bundesliga | 17 | 0 | 1 | 0 | — | | — | | 18 | 0 |
| Augsburg | 2022–23 | Bundesliga | 13 | 0 | 2 | 0 | — | | — | | 15 | 0 |
| Augsburg | Total | | 69 | 0 | 6 | 0 | — | | — | | 75 | 0 |
| San Jose Earthquakes | 2023 | MLS | 28 | 0 | 1 | 0 | 0 | 0 | 2 | 0 | 31 | 0 |
| San Jose Earthquakes | 2024 | MLS | 24 | 0 | 0 | 0 | — | | 4 (Note: Appearances in Leagues Cup) | 0 | 28 | 0 |
| San Jose Earthquakes | Total | | 52 | 0 | 1 | 0 | 0 | 0 | 6 | 0 | 57 | 0 |
| Career total | | | 318 | 7 | 13 | 1 | 12 | 1 | 9 | 0 | 352 | 9 |

=== International ===
As of match played 19 November 2024

Ecuador
| Year | Apps | Goals |
|---|---|---|
| 2014 | 8 | 0 |
| 2015 | 2 | 0 |
| 2016 | 7 | 0 |
| 2018 | 4 | 0 |
| 2019 | 5 | 0 |
| 2020 | 3 | 1 |
| 2021 | 10 | 0 |
| 2022 | 8 | 0 |
| 2023 | 7 | 0 |
| 2024 | 10 | 0 |
| Total | 64 | 1 |

List of international goals scored by Carlos Gruezo
| No. | Date | Venue | Opponent | Score | Result | Competition |
|---|---|---|---|---|---|---|
| 1 | 12 November 2020 | Estadio Hernando Siles, La Paz, Bolivia | Bolivia | 3–2 | 3–2 | 2022 FIFA World Cup qualification |

== Honours ==
Barcelona S.C.

- Serie A de Ecuador: 2012

FC Dallas

- U.S. Open Cup: 2016
- Supporters' Shield: 2016
