= 2026 St. Louis City SC season =

St. Louis City 2026 soccer season

St. Louis City
2026 season
- Sporting director: Corey Wray
- Head coach: Yoann Damet
- Stadium: Energizer Park
- Major League Soccer: Conference: 2nd Overall: 4th
- MLS Cup playoffs: Qualified
- U.S. Open Cup: Winners
- Top goalscorer: League: Simon Becher (9); All: Simon Becher (10)
Home colors	Away colors

The 2026 season is the fourth season for St. Louis City SC. It is also the club's fourth season in Major League Soccer (MLS). This is the first season of head coach Yoann Damet, who was appointed on December 16, 2025.

In addition to playing in the MLS regular season, St. Louis City SC are competing in the U.S. Open Cup.

== Club ==
=== Team management ===
Role	Name	Nationality
Sporting Director	Corey Wray	Canada
Assistant Sporting Director	Ally Mackay	Scotland
Head Coach	Yoann Damet	France
Assistant Coach	David Sauvry	Canada
Assistant Coach	Marcelo Sarvas	Brazil
Assistant Coach / Individual Development	Baggio Hušidić	Bosnia-Herzegovina
Director of Goalkeeping / Set-piece Coach	Alex Langer	Germany
Director of Scouting	Colin Rooney	United States

=== First-team roster ===
As of February 24, 2026

Note: Flags indicate national team as defined under FIFA eligibility rules; some limited exceptions apply. Players may hold more than one non-FIFA nationality.

No.	Pos.	Nation	Player
1	GK	SUI	Roman Bürki (captain)
4	DF	SEN	Mamadou Mbacke Fall
5	DF	CAN	Lukas MacNaughton
6	MF	NOR	Conrad Wallem
7	MF	CZE	Tomáš Ostrák
8	MF	USA	Chris Durkin
10	MF	GER	Eduard Löwen
11	FW	USA	Simon Becher
12	MF	BRA	Célio Pompeu
14	DF	NOR	Tomas Totland
15	DF	GHA	Joshua Yaro
16	FW	VEN	Sergio Córdova (on loan from Young Boys)
20	DF	BRA	Rafael Santos
21	MF	USA	Dante Polvara

No.	Pos.	Nation	Player
23	MF	ROU	Alexandru Mățan
22	DF	CAN	Kyle Hiebert
24	MF	USA	Daniel Edelman
27	DF	SEN	Fallou Fall
28	MF	USA	Miguel Perez (HG)
32	DF	GER	Timo Baumgartl
33	MF	USA	Tyson Pearce (HG)
36	FW	GER	Cedric Teuchert
39	GK	GER	Ben Lundt
46	FW	USA	Caden Glover (HG)
59	FW	USA	Mykhi Joyner (HG)
77	FW	KOR	Jeong Sang-bin
80	FW	USA	Brendan McSorley
99	DF	MEX	Jaziel Orozco

=== Out on loan ===
Note: Flags indicate national team as defined under FIFA eligibility rules; some limited exceptions apply. Players may hold more than one non-FIFA nationality.

No.	Pos.	Nation	Player
3	MF	AUS	Jake Girdwood-Reich (on loan to Auckland FC)
31	GK	USA	Christian Olivares (on loan to Sporting JAX)

== Transfers ==
=== Transfers in ===
Pos	Player	Transferred from	Fee/Notes	Date	Source
MF	(United States) Daniel Edelman	(United States) Red Bull New York	Trade	January 13, 2026	
MF	(Norway) Conrad Wallem	(Czech Republic) Slavia Prague	Transfer	January 20, 2026	
DF	(Brazil) Rafael Santos	(United States) Colorado Rapids	Free	January 27, 2026	
DF	(Senegal) Mamadou Mbacke	(Spain) Barcelona	Free	January 29, 2026	
MF	(United States) Dante Polvara	(Scotland) Aberdeen	Transfer	January 30, 2026	
DF	(Canada) Lukas MacNaughton	(United States) D.C. United	Free	February 10, 2026	
MF	(Romania) Alexandru Mățan	(Greece) Panetolikos	Transfer	July 21, 2026	

=== Transfers out ===
Pos	Player	Transferred to	Fee/Notes	Date	Source
MF	(Germany) Cedric Teuchert	Free Club	Free	July 1, 2026	
DF	(Australia) Jake Girdwood-Reich	(Scotland) Motherwell FC	Transfer	July 15, 2026	
MF	(Germany) Marcel Hartel	(Germany) Hannover 96	Transfer	August 11, 2026	
MF	(Germany) Eduard Löwen	(United States) San Jose Earthquakes	Transfer	August 26, 2026	

=== Loan in ===
Pos	Player	Loaned from	Start	End	Source
FW	(Venezuela) Sergio Córdova	(Switzerland) Young Boys	February 24, 2026	June 30, 2026	

=== Loan out ===
Pos	Player	Loaned to	Start	End	Source
MF	(Australia) Jake Girdwood-Reich	(New Zealand) Auckland	September 15, 2025	June 30, 2026	
GK	(United States) Christian Olivares	(United States) Sporting JAX	January 9, 2026	December 1, 2026	

== Non-competitive ==
=== Preseason exhibitions ===
February 14	D.C. United	4–1	St. Louis City	Indio, California
TBD				Stadium: Empire Polo Club

== Competitions ==
=== Overall ===
Competition	Started round	Final position	First match	Last match
MLS	Match day 1	In progress	February 21, 2026	November 7, 2026
U.S. Open Cup	Round of 32	Winners	April 14, 2026	October 21, 2026

=== Major League Soccer ===
==== Western Conference table ====
MLS Western Conference table (2026)
Pos	Team	Pld	W	L	T	GF	GA	GD	Pts	Qualification
1	Vancouver Whitecaps FC	34	19	8	7	74	34	+40	64	Qualification for round one and the CONCACAF Champions Cup round one
2	FC Dallas	34	16	8	10	62	51	+11	58	Qualification for round one
3	St. Louis City SC	34	15	10	9	59	48	+11	54	Qualification for round one
4	San Jose Earthquakes	34	14	10	10	57	51	+6	52	Qualification for round one
5	Houston Dynamo FC	34	14	11	9	43	43	0	51	Qualification for round one

Source: MLS
Rules for classification: 1) points; 2) total wins; 3) total goal differential; 4) total goals scored; 5) fewer disciplinary points; 6) away goal differential; 7) away goals scored; 8) home goals differential; 9) home goals scored; 10) coin toss (2 clubs tied) or drawing of lots (≥3 clubs tied)

==== Overall table ====
Overall MLS standings table
Pos	Team	Pld	W	L	T	GF	GA	GD	Pts	Qualification
6	Chicago Fire FC	34	16	11	7	64	54	+10	55	
7	Charlotte FC	34	15	10	9	66	51	+15	54	
8	St. Louis City SC (U)	34	15	10	9	59	48	+11	54	Qualification for the CONCACAF Champions Cup round one (Note: As winners of U.S. Open Cup)
9	San Jose Earthquakes	34	14	10	10	57	51	+6	52	
10	Houston Dynamo FC	34	14	11	9	43	43	0	51	

Source: MLS
Rules for classification: 1) points; 2) total wins; 3) total goal differential; 4) total goals scored; 5) fewer disciplinary points; 6) away goal differential; 7) away goals scored; 8) home goals differential; 9) home goals scored; 10) coin toss (2 clubs tied) or drawing of lots (≥3 clubs tied)
(U) U.S. Open Cup winners

==== Match results ====
February 21 1	St. Louis City SC	1–1	Charlotte FC	St. Louis, Missouri
1:30 pm CST	Baumgartl (yellow card) 40'; Hartel 60'; Orozco (yellow card) 66'	Report	Privett (yellow card) 7'; Zaha (yellow card) 71'; Biel 73'	Stadium: Energizer Park; Attendance: 22,423; Referee: Ismail Elfath

March 1 2	San Diego FC	2–0	St. Louis City SC	San Diego, California
6:00 pm CST	Dreyer 3'; Ingvartsen 54'	Report	Durkin (yellow card) 45+1'	Stadium: Snapdragon Stadium; Attendance: 21,969; Referee: Drew Fischer

March 7 3	St. Louis City SC	0–1	Seattle Sounders FC	St. Louis, Missouri
7:30 pm CST	Durkin (yellow card) 33'	Report	A. Roldán (yellow card) 44'; Kossa-Rienzi 47'; Dotson (yellow card) 74'; Arriola (yellow card) 81'	Stadium: Energizer Park; Attendance: 22,423; Referee: Timothy Ford

March 14 4	Los Angeles FC	2–0	St. Louis City SC	Los Angeles, California
9:30 pm CDT	Choinière 73', 81'	Report		Stadium: BMO Stadium; Attendance: 22,266; Referee: Rosendo Mendoza

March 21 5	St. Louis City SC	3–1	New England Revolution	St. Louis, Missouri
7:30 pm CDT	Becher 29'; Santos (yellow card) 38'; Durkin 45+3'; Hartel 83'; Orozco (yellow card) 88'; Bürki (yellow card) 90+10'	Report	Feingold 14'; Ceballos (yellow card) 52'; Fofana (yellow card) 66'	Stadium: Energizer Park; Attendance: 22,423; Referee: Sergii Boiko

April 4 6	New York City FC	1–1	St. Louis City SC	New York, New York
6:30 pm CDT	Wolf 51', (yellow card) 58'	Report	Edelman (yellow card) 43'; Orozco (yellow card) 56'; Polvara (yellow card) 61'; McSorley 90+6'	Stadium: Citi Field; Attendance: 20,867; Referee: Pierre-Luc Lauziere

April 11 7	FC Dallas	1–1	St. Louis City SC	Frisco, Texas
7:30 pm CDT	Cappis (yellow card) 40'; Urhoghide (yellow card) 40'; Deedson 48'; Collodi (yellow card) 58'	Report	Córdova (yellow card) 32'; Baumgartl 61'	Stadium: Toyota Stadium; Attendance: 11,004; Referee: Filip Dujic

April 18 8	Seattle Sounders FC	4−1	St. Louis City SC	Seattle, Washington
8:30 pm CDT	C. Roldan 22', 37'; Rusnák 49' (pen.); De Rosario 86'	Report	Löwen 90+2'	Stadium: Lumen Field; Attendance: 30,596; Referee: Chris Penso

April 25 9	St. Louis City SC	2–3	San Jose Earthquakes	St. Louis, Missouri
7:30 pm CDT	Córdova 52'; Hartel 53'; Durkin (yellow card) 84'; Polvara (yellow card) 90+5'	Report	Judd 8', (yellow card) 59'; Werner 69' (pen.), 83'; Daniel (yellow card) 75'; Ricketts (yellow card) 84'	Stadium: Energizer Park; Attendance: 22,423; Referee: Drew Fischer

May 3 10	Austin FC	2–0	St. Louis City SC	Austin, Texas
4:30 pm CDT	Biro (yellow card) 36'; Ramirez 69'; Uzuni 81'; Hines-Ike (yellow card) 87'	Report	Baumgartl (yellow card) 51'; Durkin (yellow card) 68'; McSorley (yellow card) 90+5'	Stadium: Q2 Stadium; Attendance: 20,738; Referee: Jon Freemon

May 9 11	Colorado Rapids	0–1	St. Louis City SC	Commerce City, Colorado
8:30 pm CDT	Ojediran (yellow card) 19'; R. Navarro (yellow card) 44'; Holding (red card) 51'; M. Navarro (yellow card) 55'	Report	Jeong Sang-bin 26'; McSorley (yellow card) 58'; Wallem (yellow card) 67'; Durkin (yellow card) 86' (yellow-red card) 87'; Perez (yellow card) 90+4'	Stadium: Dick's Sporting Goods Park; Attendance: 16,028; Referee: Timothy Ford

May 13 12	St. Louis City SC	2–1	Los Angeles FC	St. Louis, Missouri
7:30 pm CDT	Totland 4', (yellow card) 49'; Polvara (yellow card) 60'; Santos 64'; Becher (yellow card) 76'	Report	Segura (yellow card) 58'; Long (yellow card) 67'; Martínez 73'; Raposo (yellow card) 83'	Stadium: Energizer Park; Attendance: 22,423; Referee: Lorenzo Hernandez

May 16 13	D.C. United	1–1	St. Louis City SC	Washington, D.C.
6:30 pm CDT	Hopkins (yellow card) 60'; Hefti (yellow card) 70'; Peglow 90'; Rowles (yellow card) 90+4'	Report	F. Fall (yellow card) 28'; Wallem (yellow card) 41' (yellow-red card) 90+2'; Durkin 50'; Perez (yellow card) 59'; M. Fall (yellow card) 90+6'	Stadium: Audi Field; Attendance: 16,888; Referee: Rodrigo Albuquerque

May 23 14	St. Louis City SC	3–0	Austin FC	St. Louis, Missouri
1:30 pm CDT	Biro 40' (o.g.); F. Fall 56'; Durkin (yellow card) 84'; Edelman 90'	Report	Dubersarsky (yellow card) 80'	Stadium: Energizer Park; Attendance: 22,423; Referee: Pierre-Luc Lauziere

July 16 15	St. Louis City SC	3–2	Sporting Kansas City	St. Louis, Missouri
7:30 pm CDT	Jeong Sang-bin 28'; Hartel 36'; Löwen 85' (pen.); Lundt (yellow card) 90'; Edelman (yellow card) 90+7'	Report	Capita 42', (yellow card) 78'; Joveljić 76'	Stadium: Energizer Park; Attendance: 22,423; Referee: Allen Chapman

July 22 16	LA Galaxy	1–3	St. Louis City SC	Carson, California
9:30 pm CDT	Garcés (yellow card) 45+1' (yellow-red card) 49'; Reus (yellow card) 45+3'; Glesnes (yellow card) 71'; Elgersma 86'	Report	MacNaughton 42', (yellow card) 56'; Hartel 45+1'; Becher 68'	Stadium: Dignity Health Sports Park; Attendance: 17,322; Referee: Malik Badawi

July 25 17	St. Louis City SC	1–0	Colorado Rapids	St. Louis, Missouri
7:30 pm CDT	Durkin (yellow card) 45+3'; Ostrák 83'	Report	Holding (red card) 12'; Ojediran (yellow card) 25'; Atencio (yellow card) 68'; Thompson (yellow card) 90+6'	Stadium: Energizer Park; Attendance: 22,423; Referee: Nabil Bensalah

August 1 18	St. Louis City SC	1–1	Real Salt Lake	St. Louis, Missouri
7:30 pm CDT	Löwen (yellow card) 28'; Durkin (yellow card) 43'; Hartel 72'; Jeong Sang-bin (yellow card) 80'	Report	Booth (yellow card) 5'; Quintin (yellow card) 29'; Yedlin (yellow card) 40'; Solans 60'	Stadium: Energizer Park; Attendance: 22,423; Referee: Chris Penso

August 15 19	San Jose Earthquakes	1–3	St. Louis City SC	San Jose, California
9:30 pm CDT	Leroux 47'; Roberts (yellow card) 82'	Report	Edelman 8'; Becher 27', 55'; Wallem (yellow card) 78'; Totland (yellow card) 84'	Stadium: PayPal Park; Attendance: 15,344; Referee: Jon Freemon

August 19 20	Sporting Kansas City	1–1	St. Louis City SC	Kansas City, Kansas
7:00 pm CDT	Bassong (yellow card) 15'; Miller (yellow card) 45'; Harris 55'	Report	Durkin (yellow card) 21'; Löwen 45+2'; Wallem (yellow card) 61'	Stadium: Sporting Park; Attendance: 15,355; Referee: Victor Rivas

August 22 21	St. Louis City SC	2–1	Houston Dynamo FC	St. Louis, Missouri
7:30 pm CDT	Becher 23', (yellow card) 63'; Mățan (yellow card) 27'; Holse (yellow card) 70'; Polvara 85'; Totland (yellow card) 90+8'	Report	Bogusz (yellow card) 58'; Bouzat (yellow card) 58'; Aliyu 75'; Halter (yellow card) 81'	Stadium: Energizer Park; Attendance: 22,423; Referee: Alexis Da Silva

August 30 22	St. Louis City SC	3–3	FC Dallas	St. Louis, Missouri
6:00 pm CDT	Becher 3'; Edelman 43'; Holse 64'; MacNaughton (yellow card) 90+7'	Report	Ramiro (yellow card) 14'; Moore 18'; Ibeagha 81'; Musa (yellow card) 89'; Farrington 90+7'	Stadium: Energizer Park; Attendance: 22,243; Referee: Jair Marrufo

September 5 23	Vancouver Whitecaps FC	1–3	St. Louis City SC	Vancouver, British Columbia
9:30 pm CDT	Sabbi 2', (yellow card) 50'; Müller (yellow card) 26'; Laborda (yellow card) 49'; Gauld (yellow card) 71'	Report	Becher 23'; Wallem (yellow card) 36', (goal) 45'; Totland 41'; Durkin (yellow card) 84'; Fal (yellow card) 90+3'	Stadium: BC Place; Attendance: 22,320; Referee: Michael Venne

September 9 24	Portland Timbers	2–2	St. Louis City SC	Portland, Oregon
9:30 pm CDT	Velde 32', 89'; E. Miller (yellow card) 58'	Report	Navarro 1', 51', (yellow card) 67'; Polvara (yellow card) 31'; Orozco (yellow card) 36'; Totland (yellow card) 45+2'	Stadium: Providence Park; Attendance: 19,351; Referee: Fotis Bazakos

September 12 25	St. Louis City SC	4–2	Minnesota United FC	St. Louis, Missouri
7:30 pm CDT	Edelman 18'; Holse 22'; Navarro 38', 57' (pen.)	Report	Chancalay 5'; Boxall (yellow card) 47'; Yeboah 61' (pen.); Duncan (yellow card) 64' (red card) 80'	Stadium: Energizer Park; Attendance: 22,423; Referee: Ricardo Montero

September 19 26	St. Louis City SC	3–1	Toronto FC	St. Louis, Missouri
7:30 pm CDT	Wallem (yellow card) 28'; Holse 41'; Totland 54'; Becher 68'; Fall (yellow card) 72'	Report	Zimmerman (yellow card) 23'; Coello (yellow card) 74'; Corbeanu 90+7'	Stadium: Energizer Park; Attendance: 22,423; Referee: Lukasz Szpala

September 30 27	New York Red Bulls	0–3	St. Louis City SC	Harrison, New Jersey
6:30 pm CDT	Forsberg (yellow card) 86'	Report	Navarro 5'; Baumgartl (yellow card) 35'; Becher 87'; Ostrák 90+1'	Stadium: Sports Illustrated Stadium; Attendance: 15,147; Referee: Rubiel Vazquez
Note: The match was originally scheduled for September 26 at 7:30 PM ET but was postponed and later rescheduled for September 30 due to inclement weather from a nor'easter.

October 11 28	St. Louis City SC	6–2	LA Galaxy	St. Louis, Missouri
6:00 pm CDT	Holse 2', 7', 21'; Durkin (yellow card) 39'; Navarro 45' (pen.), 53'; MacNaughton 45+7'; Wallem (yellow card) 63'	Report	Taylor 31'; Aude (yellow card) 67'; Klauss 71'; Miller (yellow card) 75'	Stadium: Energizer Park; Attendance: 22,423; Referee: Joe Dickerson

October 14 29	St. Louis City SC	0–0	Vancouver Whitecaps FC	St. Louis, Missouri
7:30 pm CDT	Fall (yellow card) 45+1'; Mățan (yellow card) 85'	Report	Ocampo (yellow card) 45+2'; Priso (yellow card) 81'	Stadium: Energizer Park; Attendance: 22,423; Referee: Filip Dujic

October 17 30	Minnesota United FC	3–2	St. Louis City SC	Saint Paul, Minnesota
3:30 pm CDT	Jackson (yellow card) 24', (goal) 49'; Yeboah 68'; Caldeira 86'; Díaz (yellow card) 90'	Report	Navarro 4'; Perez (yellow card) 26'; Jeong Sang-bin 10', (yellow card) 51'	Stadium: Allianz Field; Attendance: 19,616; Referee: Ramy Touchan

October 24 31	Real Salt Lake	3–0	St. Louis City SC	Sandy, Utah
8:30 pm CDT	Quinton (yellow card) 40'; Solans 41', 59'; Marczuk 52'; Sanabria (yellow card) 64'	Report	Santos (yellow card) 3'; Ostrák (yellow card) 30' (red card) 44'	Stadium: America First Field; Attendance: 20,614; Referee: Drew Fischer

October 28 32	St. Louis City SC	2–3	Portland Timbers	St. Louis, Missouri
7:30 pm CDT	Edelman 58'; Navarro 90+1'	Report	Velde 42', 48'; Da Costa 45+3'; Izoita (yellow card) 62'; Miller (yellow card) 71' (red card) 90+6'; Janssen (yellow card) 84'; Smith (yellow card) 88'	Stadium: Energizer Park; Referee: Rubiel Vazquez

October 31 33	St. Louis City SC	0–1	San Diego FC	St. Louis, Missouri
2:00 pm CDT	MacNaughton (yellow card) 74'; Holse (yellow card) 87'	Report	Dreyer 39'; Alvarado Jr. (yellow card) 56'	Stadium: Energizer Park; Attendance: 22,423; Referee: Jon Freemon

November 7 34	Houston Dynamo FC	0–1	St. Louis City SC	Houston, Texas
6:00 pm CST	Halter (yellow card) 82'	Report	MacNaughton 90+7'	Stadium: Shell Energy Stadium; Attendance: 19,886; Referee: Allen Chapman

=== MLS Cup playoffs ===
November 23 Round one match 1	St. Louis City SC	v	Los Angeles FC	St. Louis, Missouri
7:00 pm CST				Stadium: Energizer Park

November 28 Round one match 2	Los Angeles FC	v	St. Louis City SC	Los Angeles, California
7:30 pm CST				Stadium: BMO Stadium

December 2 Round one match 3	St. Louis City SC	v	Los Angeles FC	St. Louis, Missouri
pm CST				Stadium: Energizer Park

=== U.S. Open Cup ===
April 15 Round of 32	St. Louis City SC (Missouri)	4–0	(Oklahoma) FC Tulsa	St. Louis, Missouri
7:00 pm CDT	Hartel 20'; Joyner (yellow card) 35', (goal) 61'; Sang-bin 36'; Ostrak 78'	Report	Sparks (yellow card) 22'; Pierre (yellow card) 47'; Cissoko (yellow card) 59'; Stauffer (red card) 65'; Webber (yellow card) 72'	Stadium: Energizer Park; Referee: Servando Berna Rico

April 29 Round of 16	Chicago Fire FC (Illinois)	1–2	(Missouri) St. Louis City SC	Bridgeview, Illinois
7:00 pm CDT	Radojević (yellow card) 28'; Salétros 63'; Waterman (yellow card) 82'	Report	Polvara (yellow card) 64'; MacNaughton (yellow card) 68'; Totland 71'; Löwen 78'; Becher (yellow card) 87'	Stadium: SeatGeek Stadium; Attendance: 3,426; Referee: Joshua Encarnación

May 19 Quarterfinals	St. Louis City SC (Missouri)	2–2 (a.e.t.) (4–2 p)	(Texas) Houston Dynamo FC	St. Louis, Missouri
7:00 pm CDT	Hartel 10', 51' (pen.); Edelman (yellow card) 57'; Durkin (yellow card) 90+7'; Joyner (yellow card) 117'	Report	Bogusz 11'; Ennali (yellow card) 29' (yellow-red card) 109'; Artur 42', (yellow card) 110'; Guilherme (yellow card) 59'; Bouzat (yellow card) 90+4'	Stadium: Energizer Park; Referee: Sergii Demianchuk
	Penalties
	Löwen (penalty scored); Hartel (penalty scored); Baumgartl (penalty scored); Durkin (penalty scored)		(penalty missed) Guilherme; (penalty scored) Lingr; (penalty scored) Holmes; (penalty missed) Herrera

September 16 Semifinals	Colorado Rapids	0–3	(Missouri) St. Louis City SC	Commerce City, Colorado
8:30 pm CDT	Cannon (yellow card) 43'; Whittaker (yellow card) 44'; Aaronson (yellow card) 58'; Williams (yellow card) 83'	Report	Sang-bin 32'; Polvara (yellow card) 38'; Becher 52'; Mățan 59'; Totland (yellow card) 64'	Stadium: Dick's Sporting Goods Park; Referee: Alexis Da Silva

==== Final ====
October 21, 2026
20:00 EDT

Columbus Crew (Ohio)	0–0 (a.e.t.)	(Missouri) St. Louis City SC
	Report
Penalties
Rodríguez (penalty missed); Amundsen (penalty scored); Tapia (penalty scored); Herrera (penalty scored)	3–5	(penalty scored) Baumgartl; (penalty scored) MacNaughton; (penalty scored) Durkin; (penalty scored) Downs; (penalty scored) Edelman

ScottsMiracle-Gro Field, Columbus, Ohio
Attendance: 20,250
Referee: Guido Gonzales Jr.

== Statistics ==
=== Appearances and goals ===
Numbers after plus-sign(+) denote appearances as a substitute.

As of March 1, 2026

No.	Pos	Nat	Player	Total		MLS		MLS Cup		U.S. Open Cup	
No.	Pos	Nat	Player	Apps	Goals	Apps	Goals	Apps	Goals	Apps	Goals
1	GK	(Switzerland) SUI	Roman Bürki	2	0	2+0	0	0+0	0	0+0	0
4	DF	(Senegal) SEN	Mamadou Mbacke Fall	0	0	0+0	0	0+0	0	0+0	0
5	DF	(Canada) CAN	Lukas MacNaughton	0	0	0+0	0	0+0	0	0+0	0
6	MF	(Norway) NOR	Conrad Wallem	2	0	2+0	0	0+0	0	0+0	0
7	MF	(Czech Republic) CZE	Tomáš Ostrák	0	0	0+0	0	0+0	0	0+0	0
8	MF	(United States) USA	Chris Durkin	2	0	2+0	0	0+0	0	0+0	0
10	MF	(Germany) GER	Eduard Löwen	0	0	0+0	0	0+0	0	0+0	0
11	FW	(United States) USA	Simon Becher	2	0	2+0	0	0+0	0	0+0	0
12	MF	(Brazil) BRA	Célio Pompeu	1	0	0+1	0	0+0	0	0+0	0
14	DF	(Norway) NOR	Tomas Totland	2	0	0+2	0	0+0	0	0+0	0
15	DF	(Ghana) GHA	Joshua Yaro	0	0	0+0	0	0+0	0	0+0	0
16	FW	(Venezuela) VEN	Sergio Córdova	0	0	0+0	0	0+0	0	0+0	0
17	MF	(Germany) GER	Marcel Hartel	1	1	1+0	1	0+0	0	0+0	0
20	DF	(Brazil) BRA	Rafael Santos	2	0	2+0	0	0+0	0	0+0	0
21	MF	(United States) USA	Dante Polvara	2	0	2+0	0	0+0	0	0+0	0
22	DF	(Canada) CAN	Kyle Hiebert	0	0	0+0	0	0+0	0	0+0	0
23	MF	(Romania) ROU	Alexandru Mățan	0	0	0+0	0	0+0	0	0+0	0
24	MF	(United States) USA	Daniel Edelman	2	0	2+0	0	0+0	0	0+0	0
27	DF	(Senegal) SEN	Fallou Fall	0	0	0+0	0	0+0	0	0+0	0
28	MF	(United States) USA	Miguel Perez	1	0	1+0	0	0+0	0	0+0	0
32	DF	(Germany) GER	Timo Baumgartl	2	0	2+0	0	0+0	0	0+0	0
33	MF	(United States) USA	Tyson Pearce	0	0	0+0	0	0+0	0	0+0	0
36	FW	(Germany) GER	Cedric Teuchert	1	0	0+1	0	0+0	0	0+0	0
39	GK	(Germany) GER	Ben Lundt	0	0	0+0	0	0+0	0	0+0	0
46	FW	(United States) USA	Caden Glover	0	0	0+0	0	0+0	0	0+0	0
59	FW	(United States) USA	Mykhi Joyner	0	0	0+0	0	0+0	0	0+0	0
77	FW	(South Korea) KOR	Jeong Sang-bin	2	0	2+0	0	0+0	0	0+0	0
80	FW	(United States) USA	Brendan McSorley	2	0	0+2	0	0+0	0	0+0	0
99	DF	(Mexico) MEX	Jaziel Orozco	2	0	2+0	0	0+0	0	0+0	0
