= 2025 St. Louis City SC season =

St. Louis City 2025 soccer season

St. Louis City SC
2025 season
- Sporting director: Lutz Pfannenstiel
- Head coach: Olof Mellberg (until May 27); David Critchley (interim, from May 27)
- Stadium: Energizer Park
- Major League Soccer: Conference: 13th Overall: 24th
- MLS Cup playoffs: Did not qualify
- U.S. Open Cup: Round of 16
- Top goalscorer: League: João Klauss (10); All: João Klauss (12)
- Average home league attendance: 21,969
Home colors	Away colors

The 2025 season was the third season (in operation) for St. Louis City SC. It was also the club's third season in Major League Soccer (MLS).

In addition to playing in the MLS regular season, St. Louis City SC competed in the U.S. Open Cup.

== Club ==
=== Management ===
Position	Name
OWNERSHIP
Chairman & Majority Owner	(United States) Carloyn Kindle
Co-Owner	(United States) Jo Ann Taylor Kindle
Co-Owner	(United States) Jim Kavanaugh
FRONT OFFICE
President & General Manager	(Argentina) Diego Gigliani
Sporting Director	(Germany) Lutz Pfannenstiel
COACHING STAFF
Interim Head Coach	(England) David Critchley
Technical Director	(United States) John Hackworth
Assistant Coach	(Bosnia and Herzegovina) Azrudin Valentić
Assistant Coach	(Bosnia and Herzegovina) Elvir Kafedžić
Goalkeeper Coach	(Germany) Alex Langer
Director of Sports Performance	(United States) Jarryd Phillips
Head of Sports Science	(United States) Kelly Roderick

=== Roster ===
As of September 12, 2025

Note: Flags indicate national team as defined under FIFA eligibility rules; some limited exceptions apply. Players may hold more than one non-FIFA nationality.

No.	Pos.	Nation	Player
1	GK	SUI	Roman Bürki (captain)
2	DF	USA	Devin Padelford (on loan from Minnesota United)
5	DF	USA	Henry Kessler
6	MF	NOR	Conrad Wallem (on loan from Slavia Prague)
7	MF	CZE	Tomáš Ostrák
8	MF	USA	Chris Durkin
9	FW	BRA	João Klauss
10	MF	GER	Eduard Löwen
11	FW	USA	Simon Becher
12	MF	BRA	Célio Pompeu
13	DF	USA	Michael Wentzel
14	DF	NOR	Tomas Totland
15	DF	GHA	Joshua Yaro
17	MF	GER	Marcel Hartel
20	DF	USA	Akil Watts

No.	Pos.	Nation	Player
21	MF	SWE	Rasmus Alm
22	DF	CAN	Kyle Hiebert
27	MF	USA	Alfredo Morales
28	MF	USA	Miguel Perez
31	GK	USA	Christian Olivares
32	DF	GER	Timo Baumgartl
36	MF	GER	Cedric Teuchert
39	GK	GER	Ben Lundt
46	FW	USA	Caden Glover
49	MF	GHA	Seth Antwi
59	FW	USA	MyKhi Joyner
71	DF	USA	Joey Zalinsky
77	FW	KOR	Jeong Sang-bin
80	FW	USA	Brendan McSorley
91	DF	USA	Jaziel Orozco
95	DF	SEN	Fallou Fall
99	DF	USA	Jayden Reid

== Competitions ==
=== Preseason ===
January 25	New England Revolution	1–0	St. Louis City SC	Bradenton, Florida
TBD CST	Yusuf 18'	Report		Stadium: IMG Academy

January 29	New York Red Bulls	0–1	St. Louis City SC	Bradenton, Florida
10:00 am CDT		Report	Teuchert 27'	Stadium: IMG Academy

February 5 CVI	Real Salt Lake	1–1	St. Louis City SC	Indio, California
2:30 pmCST	Brook 70'	Report	Katranis 37' (o.g.)	Stadium: Empire Polo Club

February 8 CVI	Austin FC	1–1	St. Louis City SC	Indio, California
1:00 pm CST	Obrian 46'	Report	Totland 88'	Stadium: Empire Polo Club

February 12 CVI	New York City FC	1–3	St. Louis City SC	Indio, California
TBD CST	Risa 86'	Report	Hartel 9'; Becher 67', 79'	Stadium: Empire Polo Club

February 15	San Jose Earthquakes	1–2	St. Louis City SC	Indio, California
TBD CST				Stadium: Empire Polo Club

=== Friendlies ===
July 30 Friendly	St. Louis City SC	v	Aston Villa	St. Louis, Missouri
7:30 PM CDT				Stadium: Energizer Park

=== Major League Soccer ===
==== Standings ====
===== Western Conference =====
MLS Western Conference table (2025)
Pos	Team	Pld	W	L	T	GF	GA	GD	Pts
11	Colorado Rapids	34	11	15	8	44	56	−12	41
12	Houston Dynamo FC	34	9	15	10	43	56	−13	37
13	St. Louis City SC	34	8	18	8	44	58	−14	32
14	LA Galaxy	34	7	18	9	46	66	−20	30
15	Sporting Kansas City	34	7	20	7	46	70	−24	28

Source: MLS
Rules for classification: 1) points; 2) total wins; 3) total goal differential; 4) total goals scored; 5) fewer disciplinary points; 6) away goal differential; 7) away goals scored; 8) home goals differential; 9) home goals scored; 10) coin toss (2 clubs tied) or drawing of lots (≥3 clubs tied)

===== Overall =====
Overall MLS standings table (2025)
Pos	Team	Pld	W	L	T	GF	GA	GD	Pts	Qualification
22	Houston Dynamo FC	34	9	15	10	43	56	−13	37	
23	New England Revolution	34	9	16	9	44	51	−7	36	
24	St. Louis City SC	34	8	18	8	44	58	−14	32	
25	Toronto FC	34	6	14	14	37	44	−7	32	
26	LA Galaxy	34	7	18	9	46	66	−20	30	Qualification for the CONCACAF Champions Cup round one (Note: As third place of Leagues Cup)

Source: MLS
Rules for classification: 1) points; 2) total wins; 3) total goal differential; 4) total goals scored; 5) fewer disciplinary points; 6) away goal differential; 7) away goals scored; 8) home goals differential; 9) home goals scored; 10) coin toss (2 clubs tied) or drawing of lots (≥3 clubs tied)

==== Match results ====
February 22 1	St. Louis City SC	0–0	Colorado Rapids	St. Louis, Missouri
7:30 pm CST	Watts (yellow card) 80'	Report	Frederick (yellow card) 80'	Stadium: Energizer Park; Attendance: 22,423; Referee: Jon Freemon

March 1 2	San Diego FC	0–0	St. Louis City SC	San Diego, California
9:30 pm CST	Negri (yellow card) 37'; Godoy (yellow card) 68'; McVey (yellow card) 90+1'	Report	Löwen (yellow card) 39'; Becher (yellow card) 44'; Wallem (yellow card) 73'; Durkin (yellow card) 76'; Hiebert (yellow card) 87'	Stadium: Snapdragon Stadium; Attendance: 34,506; Referee: Lukasz Szpala

March 9 3	LA Galaxy	0–3	St. Louis City SC	Carson, California
6:00 pm CDT	Cerrillo (yellow card) 33'	Report	Teuchert 44'; Hartel 49'; Horn (yellow card) 52'; Yaro (yellow card) 72'; Becher 84'	Stadium: Dignity Health Sports Park; Attendance: 19,271; Referee: Jair Marrufo

March 15 4	St. Louis City SC	1–0	Seattle Sounders FC	St. Louis, Missouri
7:30 pm CDT	Löwen 15'; Kessler (yellow card) 72'; Becher (yellow card) 81'	Report	Ragen (yellow card) 14'; Ferreira (yellow card) 45+1'; Vargas (yellow card) 64'; Roldán (yellow card) 83'	Stadium: Energizer Park; Attendance: 22,423; Referee: Fotis Bazakos

March 22 5	Philadelphia Union	1–0	St. Louis City SC	Chester, Pennsylvania
6:30 pm CDT	Glavinovich 8', (yellow card) 27'; Mbaizo (yellow card) 58'; Rick (yellow card) 81'	Report	Hiebert (yellow card) 20'; Durkin (yellow card) 26'; Löwen (yellow card) 55' (yellow-red card) 66'; Morales (yellow card) 85'	Stadium: Subaru Park; Attendance: 18,639; Referee: Ricardo Fierro

March 30 6	St. Louis City SC	0–1	Austin FC	St. Louis, Missouri
1:00 pm CDT	Horn (yellow card) 40'	Report	Uzuni 33', (yellow card) 45'; Vázquez (yellow card) 80'; Obrian (yellow card) 83'; Šabović (yellow card) 90+2'	Stadium: Energizer Park; Attendance: 22,423; Referee: Sergii Boiko

April 5 7	Sporting Kansas City	2–0	St. Louis City SC	Kansas City, Kansas
7:30 pm CDT	Bartlett (yellow card) 39'; Joveljić 71', 88'	Report	Wallem (yellow card) 28'; Ostrák (yellow card) 78'	Stadium: Children's Mercy Park; Attendance: 18,116; Referee: Tori Penso

April 13 8	St. Louis City SC	1–2	Columbus Crew	St. Louis, Missouri
6:00 pm CDT	Klauss 7'; Pompeu (yellow card) 39'; Kessler (yellow card) 90+5'	Report	Moreira 45+2'; Rossi 55'; Arfsten (yellow card) 76'	Stadium: Energizer Park; Attendance: 22,423; Referee: Rosendo Mendoza

April 19 9	St. Louis City SC	0–0	Vancouver Whitecaps FC	St. Louis, Missouri
7:30 pm CDT	Klauss (yellow card) 36'; Wallem (yellow card) 62'	Report	Sabbi (yellow card) 42'; Cubas (yellow card) 56'; Vite (yellow card) 66'; Ahmed (yellow card) 90+2'	Stadium: Energizer Park; Attendance: 17,097; Referee: Pierre-Luc Lauziere

April 27 10	Los Angeles FC	2–2	St. Louis City SC	Los Angeles, California
6:00 pm CDT	Bouanga 70', 90+9'; Tillman (yellow card) 78'	Report	Morales (yellow card) 48' (yellow-red card) 83'; Teuchert 51'; Ordaz 89' (o.g.)	Stadium: BMO Stadium; Attendance: 22,212; Referee: Jair Maruffo

May 3 11	Seattle Sounders FC	4–1	St. Louis City SC	Seattle, Washington
9:30 pm CDT	A. Roldán (yellow card) 29'; Rusnák 33' (pen.); Vargas (yellow card) 35', (goal) 61'; Rothrock (yellow card) 43'; Musovski 81'; Nouhou 90+1'	Report	Hartel 29' (pen.); Teuchert (yellow card) 41'; Hiebert (yellow card) 66'	Stadium: Lumen Field; Attendance: 31,236; Referee: Lorenzo Hernandez

May 10 12	St. Louis City SC	1–2	San Diego FC	St. Louis, Missouri
7:30 pm CDT	Ostrák (yellow card) 59'; Hiebert 90+1'; Baumgartl (yellow card) 90+6'	Report	Valakari (yellow card) 39'; Iloski 79'; Dreyer 87'; Verhoeven (yellow card) 90+6'	Stadium: Energizer Park; Attendance: 22,423; Referee: Allen Chapman

May 14 13	St. Louis City SC	2–2	Sporting Kansas City	St. Louis, Missouri
7:30 pm CDT	Pompeu 15'; Teuchert 44'; Zalinsky (yellow card) 85'	Report	Voloder (yellow card) 31'; Sallói (yellow card) 45+2'; Bassong (yellow card) 50'; Leibold 71'; Joveljić 77'	Stadium: Energizer Park; Attendance: 22,423; Referee: Lukasz Szpala

May 17 14	Minnesota United FC	3–0	St. Louis City SC	Saint Paul, Minnesota
7:30 pm CDT	Pereyra (yellow card) 3', (goal) 62'; Oluwaseyi 33'; Gressel 78'	Report	Baumgartl (yellow card) 11'	Stadium: Allianz Field; Attendance: 19,643; Referee: Ricardo Fierro

May 24 15	Colorado Rapids	1–0	St. Louis City SC	Commerce City, Colorado
7:30 pm CDT	Yapi 41', (yellow card) 90+3'	Report	Reid (yellow card) 82'; Pompeu (yellow card) 88'	Stadium: Dick's Sporting Goods Park; Attendance: 15,109; Referee: Tori Penso

May 31 16	St. Louis City SC	2–1	San Jose Earthquakes	St. Louis, Missouri
1:30 pm CDT	Klauss (yellow card) 30', (goal) 45+2'; Silva (yellow card) 43'; Löwen 90+2' (pen.); Wallem (yellow card) 90+4' (yellow-red card) 90+6'	Report	Floriani (yellow card) 35'; Martínez 83'; Edwards Jr. (yellow card) 90'	Stadium: Energizer Park; Attendance: 22,423; Referee: Ismir Pekmic

June 8 17	Portland Timbers	2−1	St. Louis City SC	Portland, Oregon
6:00 pm CDT	Fory (yellow card) 13'; Antony 55'; Ayala 90+2'; Miller (yellow card) 90+4'; Mora (yellow card) 90+8'	Report	Baumgartl (yellow card) 45'; Watts 50'; Becher (yellow card) 68'	Stadium: Providence Park; Attendance: 21,675; Referee: Malik Badawi

June 14 18	St. Louis City SC	3−3	LA Galaxy	St. Louis, Missouri
3:30 pm CDT	Klauss 35', 47', 90+5'	Report	Pec 41', 87'; Nascimento 51'; Lepley (yellow card) 90+4'	Stadium: Energizer Park; Attendance: 22,423; Referee: Marcos de Oliveira

June 25 19	St. Louis City SC	2–4	Orlando City SC	St. Louis, Missouri
7:30 pm CDT	Becher 40'; Klauss 45+3'; Reid (yellow card) 67'; Wentzel (yellow card) 90'	Report	Enrique 7', 22'; Pašalić 9', 82'	Stadium: Energizer Park; Attendance: 22,422; Referee: Guido Gonzales Jr.

June 28 20	Houston Dynamo FC	1–0	St. Louis CIty SC	Houston, Texas
7:30 pm CDT	Ortiz (yellow card) 38'; Ponce 66'; Escobar (yellow card) 90+6'	Report	Zalinsky (yellow card) 2'; Reid (yellow card) 21'; Lundt (yellow card) 42'	Stadium: Shell Energy Stadium; Attendance: 16,886; Referee: Alexis Da Silva

July 5 21	Real Salt Lake	3–2	St. Louis City SC	Sandy, Utah
8:30 pm CDT	Caliskan 6'; Russell (yellow card) 32'; Gonçalves 43'; Yaro 64' (o.g.)	Report	Wallem (yellow card) 17'; Klauss 51'; Yaro 81'	Stadium: America First Field; Attendance: 20,036; Referee: Allen Chapman

July 13 22	St. Louis City SC	2−1	Portland Timbers	St. Louis, Missouri
6:00 pm CDT	Hartel 54', 67'; Klauss (yellow card) 90+2'; Orozco (yellow card) 90+3'	Report	da Costa 19'; Ortiz (yellow card) 59'; Kelsy (yellow card) 64'; Mosquera (yellow card) 77'; K. Miller (yellow card) 79'	Stadium: Energizer Park; Attendance: 22,423; Referee: Ricardo Montero

July 19 23	FC Dallas	3–0	St. Louis City SC	Frisco, Texas
7:30 pm CDT	Kaick 24'; Kamungo (yellow card) 59'; Farrington (yellow card) 77'; Musa 79', 88' (pen.)	Report		Stadium: Toyota Stadium; Attendance: 11,006; Referee: Marcos de Oliveira

July 26 24	St. Louis City SC	1–2	Minnesota United FC	St. Louis, Missouri
7:30 pm CDT	Löwen 36' (pen.); Wallem (yellow card) 47'; Durkin (red card) 73'	Report	Markanich (yellow card) 56'; Yeboah 75' (pen.), 90' (pen.)	Stadium: Energizer Park; Attendance: 22,423; Referee: Victor Rivas

August 9 25	St. Louis City SC	3−1	Nashville SC	St. Louis, Missouri
7:30 pm CDT	Orozco 23'; Klauss 39'; Morales (yellow card) 55'; Jeong Sang-bin 66'; Joyner (yellow card) 90+3'	Report	Mukhtar 85' (pen.); Muyl (yellow card) 90+6'	Stadium: Energizer Park; Attendance: 22,423; Referee: Lorenzo Hernandez

August 16 26	Chicago Fire FC	3–2	St. Louis City SC	Bridgeview, Illinois
7:30 pm CDT	Cuypers 16'; Zinckernagel 67'; Gutiérrez 87'	Report	Hartel (yellow card) 36' (goal) 59'; Ostrák 47' (yellow card) 61'; Löwen (yellow card) 90+1'; Bürki (yellow card) 90+3'	Stadium: SeatGeek Stadium; Attendance: 17,485; Referee: Jair Marrufo

August 23 27	Vancouver Whitecaps FC	3–2	St. Louis City SC	Vancouver, British Columbia
8:30 pm CDT	White 45+4' (pen.); Cubas (yellow card) 69'; Rios 79'; Müller 90+14' (pen.)	Report	Löwen 14'; Klauss 73'	Stadium: BC Place; Attendance: 26,031; Referee: Fotis Bazakos

August 30 28	St. Louis City SC	2–3	Houston Dynamo FC	St. Louis, Missouri
7:30 pm CDT	Löwen (yellow card) 43', (goal) 86'; Morales (yellow card) 53'; Joyner 89', (yellow card) 90+1'	Report	Ponce 20', (yellow card) 45+2'; Kessler 50' (o.g.); Antônio Carlos (yellow card) 54'; Andrade (yellow card) 58'; Holmes 72'	Stadium: Energizer Park; Attendance: 22,423; Referee: Ricardo Montero

September 6 29	St. Louis City SC	1–1	FC Dallas	St. Louis, Missouri
7:30 pm CDT	Pompeu 32'	Report	Collodi (red card) 16'; Musa 35'; Delgado (yellow card) 60'	Stadium: Energizer Park; Attendance: 22,423; Referee: Allen Chapman

September 13 30	CF Montréal	0–2	St. Louis City SC	Montreal, Quebec
6:30 pm CDT	Piette (yellow card) 51'; Loturi (yellow card) 85'	Report	Wallem 11'; Durkin (yellow card) 18'; Hartel 55'	Stadium: Saputo Stadium; Attendance: 15,316; Referee: Ismir Pekmic

September 20 31	San Jose Earthquakes	1–3	St. Louis City SC	San Jose, California
7:30 pm CDT	Arango 31' (pen.); Vieira (yellow card) 45+2'; Judd (yellow card) 72'; Kikanović (yellow card) 81'	Report	McSorley 10', 45'; Hartel 19'; Becher (yellow card) 81'	Stadium: PayPal Park; Attendance: 15,337; Referee: Sergii Demianchuk

September 27 32	St. Louis City SC	0–3	Los Angeles FC	St. Louis, Missouri
7:30 pm CDT	Jeong Sang-bin (yellow card) 3'; Pompeu (yellow card) 66'; Löwen (yellow card) 73'; Baumgartl (yellow card) 90'; Klauss (yellow card) 90+10'	Report	Bouanga 15'; Son Heung-Min 45+4', 60'; Segura (yellow card) 51'	Stadium: Energizer Park; Attendance: 22,423; Referee: Victor Rivas

October 4 33	Austin FC	1–3	St. Louis City SC	Austin, Texas
7:30 pm CDT	Svatok 36'; Sánchez (yellow card) 43'; Taylor (yellow card) 90+6'; Rubio (yellow card) 90+6'	Report	Hartel 28', 45'; Morales (yellow card) 34'; McSorley (yellow card) 72'; Becher 90+3'	Stadium: Q2 Stadium; Attendance: 20,738; Referee: Ricardo Fierro

October 18 34	St. Louis City SC	2–2	Real Salt Lake	St. Louis, Missouri
8:00 pm CDT	Durkin (yellow card) 21'; Löwen 42' (pen.); Fall (yellow card) 79'; Klauss 88'; Ostrák (yellow card) 90+7'	Report	Olatunji 17', 32'; Luna (yellow card) 24'; Glad (yellow card) 74'; Yedlin (yellow card) 85'	Stadium: Energizer Park; Referee: Armando Villarreal

=== U.S. Open Cup ===
May 7 Round of 32	St. Louis City SC (Missouri)	2–0	(Nebraska) Union Omaha	St. Louis, Missouri
7:00 pm CDT	Zalinsky 68'; Klauss 87'; Joyner (yellow card) 90+3'	Report	Knapp (yellow card) 45+3'; Gallardo (yellow card) 62'; Ostrem (yellow card) 90'	Stadium: Energizer Park; Referee: William Hale

May 21 Round of 16	Minnesota United FC	3–2	(Missouri) St. Louis City SC	Saint Paul, Minnesota
6:30 pm CDT	Yeboah 10'; Harvey (yellow card) 26'; Markanich (yellow card) 42', (goal) 85', 88'	Report	Durkin (yellow card) 24'; Hartel 55'; Klauss 65'	Stadium: Allianz Field; Attendance: 3,325; Referee: Brandon Stevis

=== Leagues Cup ===
St. Louis City SC did not qualify for the 2025 Leagues Cup as they were not one of the top 9 teams in the Western Conference for the 2024 season.

== Transfers ==
=== In ===
No.	Pos.	Player	Transferred from	Type	Date	Ref.
32	DF	(Germany) Timo Baumgartl	Free agent	Free	November 29, 2024	
28	MF	(United States) Miguel Perez	(United States) Birmingham Legion FC	Loan return	January 1, 2025	
6	MF	(Norway) Conrad Wallem	(Czech Republic) Slavia Prague	Loan	January 17, 2025	
27	MF	(United States) Alfredo Morales	Free agent	Free	February 21, 2025	
71	DF	(United States) Joey Zalinsky	(United States) Rutgers University	MLS SuperDraft	February 22, 2025	
45	FW	(Portugal) Xande Silva	(United States) Atlanta United	$100,000 GAM	April 23, 2025	
6	MF	(South Africa) Njabulo Blom	(South Africa) Kaizer Chiefs	Loan return	July 1, 2025	
95	DF	(Senegal) Fallou Fall	(Norway) Fredrikstad	Transfer	July 15, 2025	
91	DF	(United States) Jaziel Orozco	(United States) St. Louis City 2	Homegrown player	July 18, 2025	
77	FW	(South Korea) Jeong Sang-bin	(United States) Minnesota United	Trade	July 21, 2025	
2	DF	(United States) Devin Padelford	(United States) Minnesota United	Loan	July 22, 2025	
80	FW	(United States) Brendan McSorley	(United States) St. Louis City 2	Homegrown	September 5, 2025	
49	MF	(Ghana) Seth Antwi	(United States) St. Louis City 2	Homegrown	September 12, 2025	

=== Out ===
No.	Pos.	Player	Transferred to	Type	Date	Ref.
41	MF	(United States) John Klein	(United States) Charleston Battery	Option declined	October 22, 2024	
2	DF	(United States) Jake Nerwinski	Unattached	Option declined	October 22, 2024	
85	MF	(Japan) Hosei Kijima	(United States) San Diego FC	Expansion draft	December 12, 2024	
29	FW	(Iceland) Nökkvi Thórisson	(Netherlands) Sparta Rotterdam	Loan	January 14, 2025	
19	MF	(United States) Indiana Vassilev	(United States) Philadelphia Union	$1,000,000 GAM	February 21, 2025	
29	FW	(Iceland) Nökkvi Thórisson	(Netherlands) Sparta Rotterdam	Transfer	June 3, 2025	
38	DF	(Germany) Jannes Horn	(Germany) 1. FC Nürnberg	Loan return	June 30, 2025	
6	MF	(South Africa) Njabulo Blom	(Vietnam) Thep Xanh Nam Dinh	Transfer	July 24, 2025	
4	DF	(Sweden) Joakim Nilsson	Unattached	Buyout	August 5, 2025	
45	MF	(Portugal) Xande Silva	(Israel) Hapoel Tel Aviv	Transfer	August 19, 2025	
3	MF	(Australia) Jake Girdwood-Reich	(Australia) Auckland FC	Loan	September 12, 2025	
