= Alexandru Mățan =

Romanian footballer (born 1999)

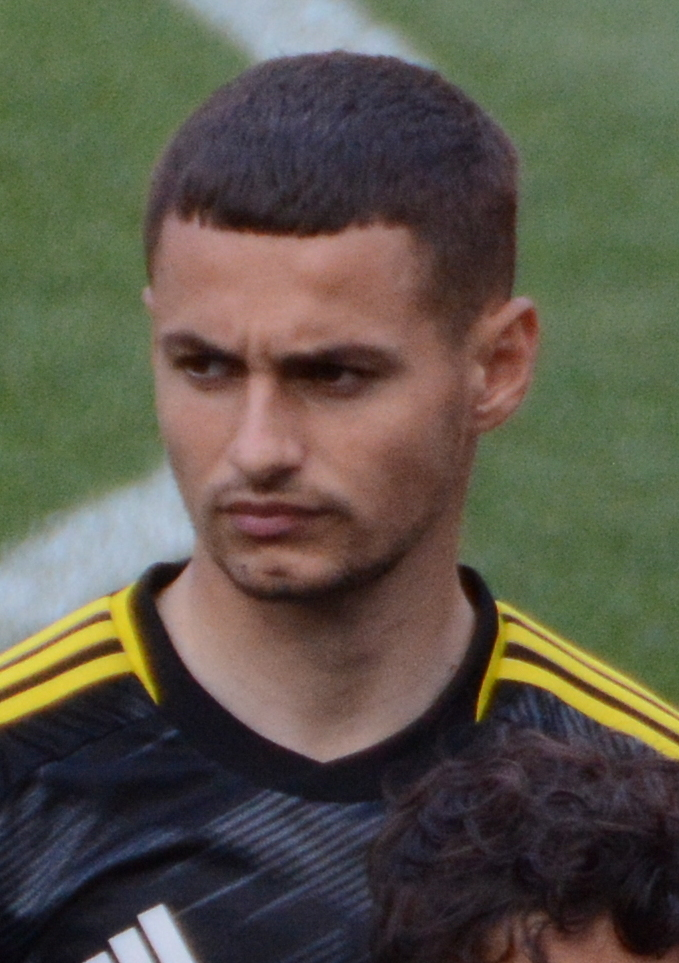
- Mățan with the Columbus Crew in 2023

Personal information
- Full name: Alexandru Irinel Mățan
- Date of birth: 29 August 1999 (age 27)
- Place of birth: Galați, Romania
- Height: 1.65 m (5 ft 5 in)
- Positions: Attacking midfielder; winger

Team information
- Current team: St. Louis City
- Number: 23

Youth career
- 2006–2009: Jiul Petroșani
- 2009–2017: Gheorghe Hagi Academy

Senior career*
Years	Team	Apps	(Gls)
2016–2021	Viitorul Constanța	53	(3)
2019–2020	→ Voluntari (loan)	25	(1)
2021–2024	Columbus Crew	93	(5)
2022	Columbus Crew 2	4	(0)
2022	→ Rapid București (loan)	6	(0)
2025	Dibba Al-Hisn	3	(0)
2025–2026	Panetolikos	34	(5)
2026–	St. Louis City	10	(0)

International career
2014–2015	Romania U16	4	(0)
2015–2016	Romania U17	3	(0)
2016	Romania U18	1	(1)
2017–2018	Romania U19	6	(8)
2017–2021	Romania U21	11	(2)
2021	Romania Olympic	2	(0)
- * Club domestic league appearances and goals as of 1 October 2026

Alexandru Irinel Mățan (Romanian pronunciation: [alekˈsandru məˈt͡san]; born 29 August 1999) is a Romanian professional footballer who plays as an attacking midfielder or a winger for Major League Soccer club St. Louis City.

== Club career ==
=== Viitorul Constanța ===
An academy graduate of Viitorul Constanța, Mățan made his Liga I debut on 6 May 2016, aged 16. He entered as a 63rd-minute substitute for Ciprian Perju and converted a penalty kick in the 3–3 away draw at Dinamo București.

In 2017, he struggled with a nagging sports hernia injury for two years, limiting his appearances. Mățan made his first appearance in European competitions on 12 July 2018, starting in a 2–0 away win over Luxembourgish team Racing FC in the first qualifying round of the UEFA Europa League.On 6 July 2019, Mățan played the full 90 minutes in a 1–0 victory over CFR Cluj for the season's Supercupa României. He subsequently participated in five of the following six games, starting all of them, which included both legs of his team's 7–5 aggregate loss to Gent in the second qualifying round of the Europa League. He was then sent on a loan for the remainder of the season to fellow league club Voluntari, amassing 25 games and netting once during his stint.

=== Columbus Crew ===
"The first 2 years in America were not the most pleasant for me, but the last 2 were incredible. I was reborn as a person, as a footballer."

— Alexandru Mățan

On 8 March 2021, Mățan joined American team Columbus Crew in a transfer rumored to be worth around €1.5 million. He made his Major League Soccer debut on 18 April, coming on as an 88th-minute substitute for Pedro Santos in a goalless draw with Philadelphia Union.

Mățan registered his first CONCACAF Champions League game 11 days later, a 2–2 home draw with Mexican side Monterrey. Playing mainly as a left winger, he totaled 30 matches in all competitions during his first season in Columbus, starting only nine of them and failing to score.

==== Loan to Rapid București ====
After falling down the pecking order for the Columbus Crew and featuring for the reserve team, Mățan was sent on a five-month loan to Rapid București on 9 August 2022, with the loan also including a purchase option. He made his debut for "the White-Burgundies" four days later, in a 1–0 away derby loss to Petrolul Ploiești.

On 23 December 2022, it was announced that Mățan's loan ended, with the player having made only six appearances due to a stress fracture suffered on his toe.

==== Return to Columbus Crew ====
Mățan returned to Columbus at the start of 2023, after Rapid București did not trigger the purchase option in his loan. On 18 March, he scored his first goal for the Crew in a 2–1 league loss to New York Red Bulls.

On 12 October 2024, Mățan scored his first professional hat-trick against the New England Revolution at Lower.com Field.

=== Dibba Al-Hisn ===
After a four-year tenure with Columbus, Mățan left as a free agent to sign with UAE Pro League club Dibba Al-Hisn in February 2025. He left the club after just six months.

=== Panetolikos ===
Mățan joined Greek club Panetolikos on 11 August 2025, signing a one-year contract.

=== St. Louis City SC ===
Mățan made his return to Major League Soccer, signing with St. Louis City SC, with the signing being announced on 21 July 2026.

== International career ==
On 21 March 2018, Mățan scored twice for the Romania national under-19 team in a 4–0 victory over Serbia at the Ilie Oană Stadium in Ploiești.

In 2021, Mățan featured for the under-21 side in the UEFA European Championship. He made three appearances in the eventual group-stage exit, and contributed with the equaliser in a 2–1 win against hosts Hungary on 27 March.

== Style of play ==
A diminutive playmaker, Mățan is typically deployed as an attacking midfielder, though he is also capable of playing as a left winger. In that role, he often cuts inside onto his stronger right foot, using his dribbling ability and flair to create opportunities. He is known for his high work rate, contributing to both attacking and defensive phases of play. Mățan is particularly noted for his dribbling skills, as well as his speed, agility, and vision.

== Career statistics ==
As of match played 1 October 2026

Appearances and goals by club, season and competition
Club	Season	League			National cup (Note: Includes Cupa României, U.S. Open Cup, Greek Cup)		Continental		Other		Total	
Club	Season	Division	Apps	Goals	Apps	Goals	Apps	Goals	Apps	Goals	Apps	Goals
Viitorul Constanța	2015–16	Liga I	1	1	—		—		—		1	1
Viitorul Constanța	2017–18	Liga I	14	1	1	1	—		1 (Note: Appearance in Supercupa României)	0	16	2
Viitorul Constanța	2018–19	Liga I	13	0	3	1	4 (Note: Appearances in UEFA Europa League)	0	—		20	1
Viitorul Constanța	2019–20	Liga I	3	0	—		2	0	1	0	6	0
Viitorul Constanța	2020–21	Liga I	22	1	1	0	—		—		23	1
Viitorul Constanța	Total		53	3	5	2	6	0	2	0	66	5
Voluntari (loan)	2019–20	Liga I	25	1	1	0	—		—		26	1
Columbus Crew	2021	Major League Soccer	28	0	—		2 (Note: Appearances in CONCACAF Champions Cup)	0	—		30	0
Columbus Crew	2022	Major League Soccer	6	0	1	0	—		—		7	0
Columbus Crew	2023	Major League Soccer	31	1	1	0	—		8 (Note: Two appearances and one goal in Leagues Cup, six appearances and one goal in MLS Cup playoffs)	2	40	3
Columbus Crew	2024	Major League Soccer	28	4	0	0	5	1	7 (Note: Four appearances in Leagues Cup, one appearance in Campeones Cup, two appearances in MLS Cup playoffs)	0	40	5
Columbus Crew	Total		93	5	2	0	7	1	15	2	117	8
Columbus Crew 2	2022	MLS Next Pro	4	0	—		—		—		4	0
Rapid București (loan)	2022–23	Liga I	6	0	—		—		—		6	0
Dibba Al-Hisn	2024–25	UAE Pro League	3	0	—		—		—		3	0
Panetolikos	2025–26	Super League Greece	34	5	6	1	—		—		40	6
St. Louis City SC	2026	Major League Soccer	10	0	1	1	–		–		11	1
Career total			228	14	15	4	13	1	17	2	273	21

== Honours ==
Viitorul Constanța

- Liga I: 2016–17
- Cupa României: 2018–19
- Supercupa României: 2019

Columbus Crew

- MLS Cup: 2023
- CONCACAF Champions Cup runner-up: 2024
- Campeones Cup: 2021; runner-up: 2024
- Leagues Cup: 2024

St. Louis City

- U.S. Open Cup: 2026
