= Roman Bürki =

Swiss footballer (born 1990)

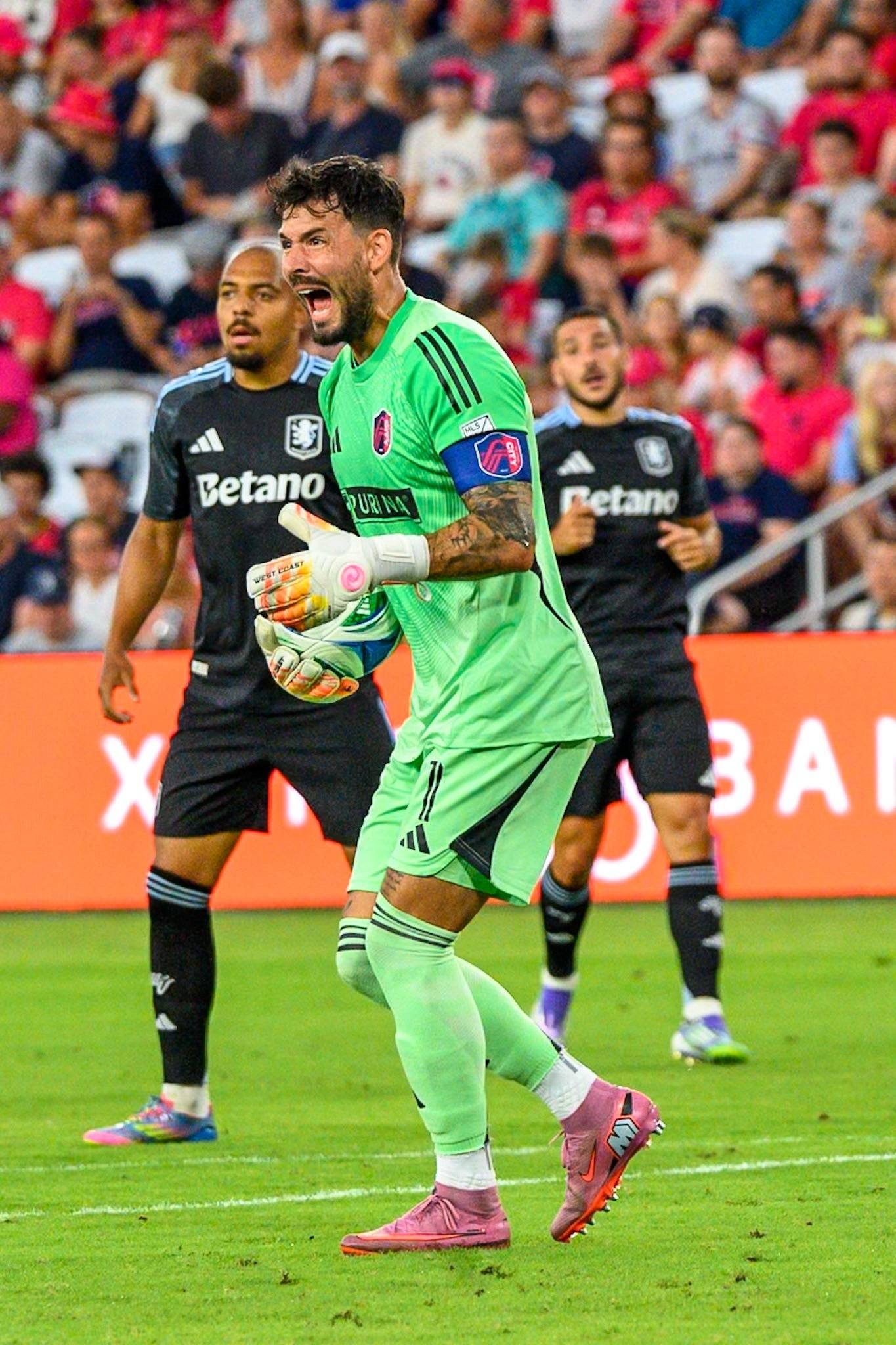
- Bürki with St. Louis City SC in 2025

Personal information
- Full name: Roman Bürki
- Date of birth: 14 November 1990 (age 36)
- Place of birth: Münsingen, Switzerland
- Height: 1.87 m (6 ft 2 in)
- Position: Goalkeeper

Team information
- Current team: St. Louis City SC
- Number: 1

Youth career
- 1999–2005: FC Münsingen
- 2005–2009: Young Boys

Senior career*
Years	Team	Apps	(Gls)
2009–2013	Young Boys	2	(0)
2009–2010	→ FC Thun (loan)	4	(0)
2010	→ FC Schaffhausen (loan)	9	(0)
2011–2013	→ Grasshoppers (loan)	76	(0)
2013–2014	Grasshoppers	34	(0)
2014–2015	SC Freiburg	34	(0)
2015–2022	Borussia Dortmund	176	(0)
2022	St. Louis City 2	4	(0)
2023–	St. Louis City SC	118	(0)

International career^{‡}
2011–2012	Switzerland U21	12	(0)
2014–2018	Switzerland	9	(0)
- * Club domestic league appearances and goals as of 17 October 2026 ‡ National team caps and goals as of 22 June 2018

Roman Bürki (born November 14 1990) is a Swiss professional footballer who plays as a goalkeeper for Major League Soccer club St. Louis City SC. From 2014 to 2018, he played for the Switzerland national team.

== Club career ==
=== Switzerland ===
Bürki began his career in 2007 with the reserve squad of the BSC Young Boys. In 2009, he moved to FC Thun, and half a year later to FC Schaffhausen. In the summer of 2010 he went back to BSC Young Boys, and again half a year later he was transferred to Grasshopper Club Zürich. First, he was the back-up goalkeeper, later the first goalkeeper. He was on loan until 2013, when Grasshoppers bought his rights.

=== SC Freiburg ===
On 24 May 2014, he signed a contract with SC Freiburg.

For 2014–15 Bundesliga season he succeeded Oliver Baumann as number one goalkeeper. He played in all 34 games, while being unable to prevent the team from being relegated to 2. Bundesliga.

=== Borussia Dortmund ===
On 14 June 2015, he signed for Borussia Dortmund. He made his formal debut for the team on 15 August 2015, in a 4–0 win over Borussia Mönchengladbach. He kept 12 clean sheets for Dortmund in the league, making 33 appearances. In the 2016–17 season, he made 27 league appearances, keeping nine clean sheets.

In the 2017–18 season, Bürki became the first goalkeeper to keep five clean sheets in the first five Bundesliga games.

=== St. Louis City SC ===
On 16 March 2022, Bürki agreed to a deal that would send him to Major League Soccer expansion franchise St. Louis City SC for their inaugural season in 2023. He is the highest-paid goalkeeper in the league and would earn a $1.5 million base salary. Bürki played four matches for reserve squad St. Louis City 2 in 2022 along with several other future St. Louis players.

On 20 February 2023, Bürki was named the club's captain.

In November of 2023, Bürki was named MLS Goalkeeper of the Year

== International career ==
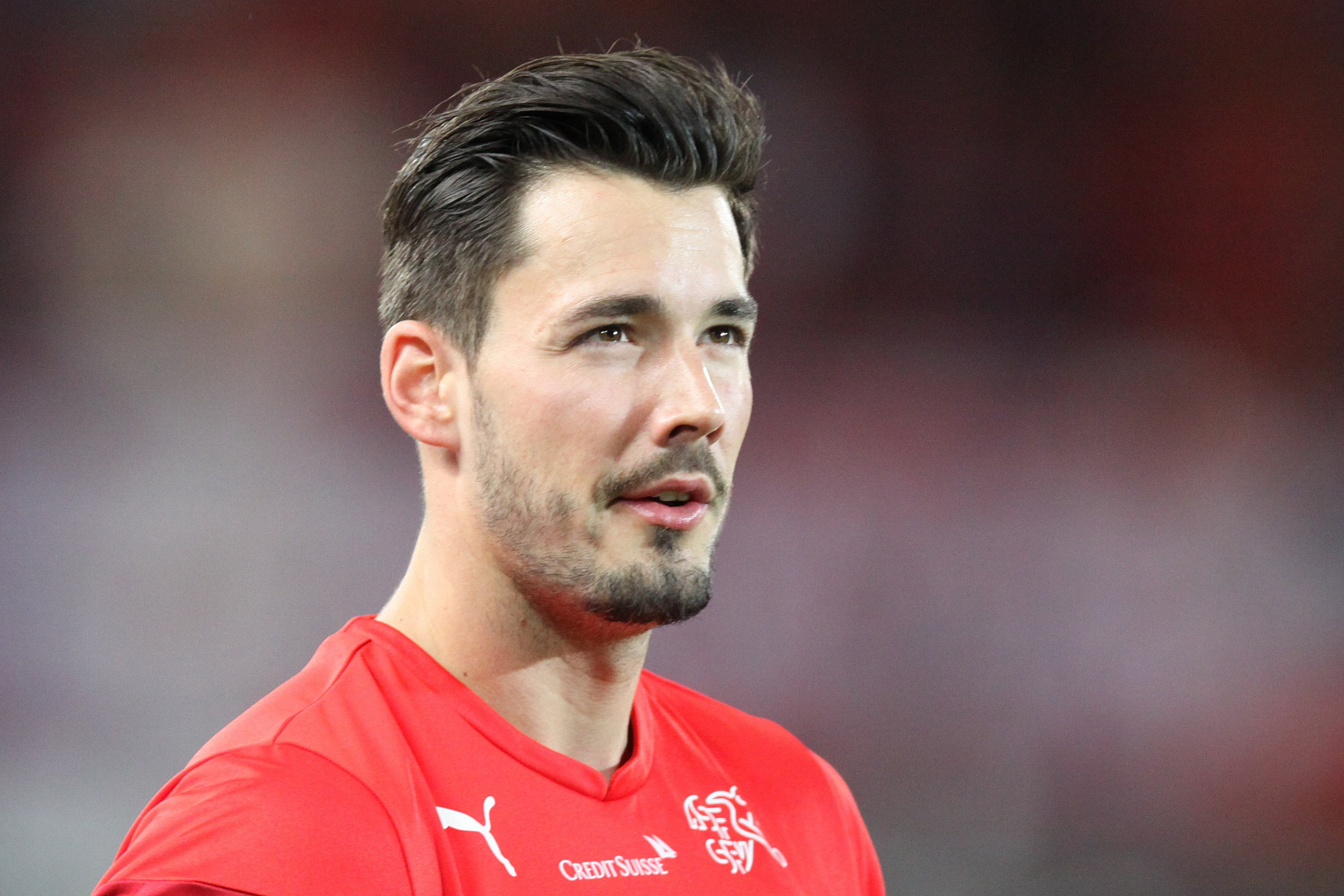
Bürki with Switzerland in 2015

Bürki played for Switzerland U-21 in the 2011 European Under-21 Championship.

In 2014, Bürki was first called up for Switzerland and was also in the squad for the 2014 World Cup in Brazil. On 18 November 2014, he made his debut in a friendly match against Poland. He was part of the squad for the 2016 European Championships, but never made it to any match. Ultimately, his team was eliminated in the round of 16 away after losing 5–4 on penalties against Poland.

He was included in Switzerland's 23-man squad for the 2018 World Cup.

In 2018, Burki stated that he did not want to be called up to the Switzerland squad in order to focus on the 2018–19 season at Dortmund.

== Personal life ==
Bürki is the older brother of FC Thun defender Marco Bürki. He is married to Oana, with whom he has three children: a daughter born in 2010, and two sons born in 2012 and 2013.

== Career statistics ==
=== Club ===
As of match played 21 October 2026

Appearances and goals by club, season and competition
Club	Season	League			National cup (Note: Includes Swiss Cup, DFB-Pokal, U.S. Open Cup)		Continental		Other		Total	
Club	Season	Division	Apps	Goals	Apps	Goals	Apps	Goals	Apps	Goals	Apps	Goals
FC Thun (loan)	2009–10	Swiss Challenge League	4	0	2	0	—		—		6	0
FC Schaffhausen (loan)	2009–10	Swiss Challenge League	9	0	0	0	—		—		9	0
Young Boys	2010–11	Swiss Super League	2	0	0	0	2	0	—		4	0
Grasshoppers (loan)	2010–11	Swiss Super League	11	0	0	0	0	0	—		11	0
Grasshoppers (loan)	2011–12	Swiss Super League	31	0	0	0	—		—		31	0
Grasshoppers (loan)	2012–13	Swiss Super League	34	0	4	0	—		—		38	0
Grasshoppers (loan)	Total		76	0	4	0	0	0	—		80	0
Grasshoppers	2013–14	Swiss Super League	34	0	3	0	4	0	—		41	0
SC Freiburg	2014–15	Bundesliga	34	0	2	0	—		—		36	0
Borussia Dortmund	2015–16	Bundesliga	33	0	6	0	3 (Note: Appearances in UEFA Europa League)	0	—		42	0
Borussia Dortmund	2016–17	Bundesliga	27	0	4	0	8 (Note: Appearances in UEFA Champions League)	0	1 (Note: Appearance in DFL-Supercup)	0	40	0
Borussia Dortmund	2017–18	Bundesliga	33	0	3	0	10 (Note: Six appearances in UEFA Champions League, four appearances in UEFA Europa League)	0	1	0	47	0
Borussia Dortmund	2018–19	Bundesliga	32	0	1	0	7	0	—		40	0
Borussia Dortmund	2019–20	Bundesliga	31	0	0	0	8	0	0	0	39	0
Borussia Dortmund	2020–21	Bundesliga	19	0	1	0	4	0	0	0	24	0
Borussia Dortmund	2021–22	Bundesliga	1	0	0	0	0	0	0	0	1	0
Borussia Dortmund	Total		176	0	15	0	40	0	2	0	233	0
St. Louis City 2	2022	MLS Next Pro	4	0	0	0	—		0	0	4	0
St. Louis City SC	2023	MLS	33	0	0	0	—		3 (Note: One appearance in Leagues Cup, two appearances in MLS Cup playoffs)	0	36	0
St. Louis City SC	2024	MLS	32	0	—		2 (Note: Appearances in CONCACAF Champions Cup)	0	3 (Note: Appearances in Leagues Cup)	0	37	0
St. Louis City SC	2025	MLS	25	0	1	0	—		—		26	0
St. Louis City SC	2026	MLS	28	0	5	0	—		0	0	33	0
St. Louis City SC	Total		118	0	6	0	2	0	6	0	132	0
Career total			457	0	32	0	48	0	8	0	545	0

=== International ===
As of 22 June 2018

Appearances and goals by national team and year
National team	Year	Apps	Goals
Switzerland	2014	1	0
Switzerland	2015	3	0
Switzerland	2016	2	0
Switzerland	2017	1	0
Switzerland	2018	2	0
Total		9	0

== Honours ==
Grasshoppers

- Swiss Cup: 2012–13

Borussia Dortmund

- DFB-Pokal: 2016–17, 2020–21
- DFL-Supercup: 2019

St. Louis City SC

- U.S. Open Cup: 2026
- Western Conference (regular season): 2023

Individual

- MLS Best XI: 2023
- MLS All-Star: 2023, 2024
- MLS Goalkeeper of the Year: 2023
