= St. Louis City SC =

American professional soccer club based in St. Louis, Missouri

- Full name: St. Louis City Soccer Club
- Founded: August 20, 2019; 7 years ago
- Stadium: Energizer Park; St. Louis, Missouri
- Capacity: 22,423
- Owners: Carolyn Kindle; Jo Ann Taylor Kindle; Jim Kavanaugh
- Chairman: Carolyn Kindle
- Sporting director: Corey Wray
- Coach: Yoann Damet
- League: Major League Soccer
- 2026: Western Conference: 3rd Overall: 8th Playoffs: TBD
- Website: stlcitysc.com
Home colors	Away colors

St. Louis City Soccer Club (stylized as St. Louis CITY SC) is an American professional soccer club based in St. Louis. The club competes in Major League Soccer (MLS) as a member of the Western Conference. City SC was established in 2019 as an expansion team; the team began play in 2023. The team plays its home matches at Energizer Park, a soccer-specific stadium across from Union Station in Downtown West.

== History ==
=== Previous attempts ===
Soccer has had an established history at both the professional and amateur levels in Greater St. Louis for more than a century. In 2007, St. Louis was considered a possible destination for Real Salt Lake after the club founder announced he would sell the club if a new stadium was not built. From 2008 to 2009, St. Louis lawyer Jeff Cooper led a group of would-be owners who attempted to bring an MLS expansion team to Greater St. Louis, only to have the bids turned down in favor of other cities. Despite approved plans to build the $600 million Collinsville Soccer Complex, MLS was unimpressed with the bid's financial backing and suggested Cooper expand his group of investors. Cooper instead launched a second division men's club and a Women's Professional Soccer franchise. AC St. Louis played only one season in Division 2 before folding in 2011; the Saint Louis Athletica folded midway through its second season in 2010.

In late 2014, the city announced plans for a new stadium to host both American football and soccer. MLS commissioner Don Garber said in January 2015, "St. Louis has got a lot of activity going on with a stadium that they're trying to get done for the NFL's Rams. There's a big soccer community out there and we'd love to see a soccer stadium downtown like they're thinking about a football stadium." In May 2015, Garber visited St. Louis to talk about a possible new multi-purpose stadium that could host soccer games. Garber cautioned that any possible expansion to St. Louis would occur after 2020. On January 12, 2016, the Rams moved to Los Angeles after playing in St. Louis for 21 seasons. The Rams' move initially accelerated the talks of an MLS expansion team.

In 2017, MLS began to consider adding a team in St. Louis, beginning in 2020. The proposed ownership group sought public funds to help build a $200 million soccer-specific stadium next to Union Station in downtown St. Louis. On January 26, 2017, a funding plan was approved by the city's Aldermanic Ways and Means Committee, and later by the entire Board of Aldermen, that would have directed $60 million in city tax revenue to the new stadium. Voters rejected the plan in an April 4, 2017, referendum, leaving the city's MLS future in doubt.

=== 2018–2019: Expansion bid ===
In September 2018, the St. Louis Post-Dispatch reported that officials with the Missouri Department of Economic Development and MLS representatives had met and discussed a stadium proposal; St. Louis Mayor Lyda Krewson later confirmed that a new group was trying to bring a team to St. Louis. St. Louis's MLS bid was effectively re-launched on October 9 of that year, with Carolyn Kindle and other heirs to the Enterprise Rent-A-Car fortune as the primary investors. The stadium location remained near Union Station in the same area as in the original 2016 bid. This bid did not seek public funding through taxes or from the city and was not required to be decided in a public vote. On November 28, 2018, the Board of Aldermen's Housing, Urban Development, and Zoning Committee voted 8–0 to approve the stadium plan.

On April 18, 2019, the MLS announced plans to expand to 30 teams, up from the previous plan of 28. The league, then at 27 teams, advised the Commissioner's office to advance the discussions with the Sacramento Republic and St. Louis bids, who would make presentations to the expansion committee. Two days later, the St. Louis group unveiled their stadium plan with a design produced by HOK and Snow Kreilich Architects. All 22,423 seats would be within 120 feet of the field and under a canopy.

On August 20, 2019, MLS announced it had approved St. Louis as the league's 28th franchise, with play expected to begin in the 2022 season. The ownership group, led by Carolyn Kindle Betz and female members of the Taylor family, is the first female majority-owned team in MLS.

=== 2019–present ===
On October 19, 2019, the ownership group released new plans for the planned soccer-specific stadium. The area was extended to encompass a 31-acre (13 ha) plan and would likely exceed the original $200 million cost estimate. The ownership group agreed to purchase and own the land along with the stadium and will not seek tax revenue or public financing. The Missouri state government had promised $30 million in tax credits for the stadium project, but withdrew their offer in December 2019. The Missouri Development Finance Board instead approved a package of incentives worth $5.7 million in tax credits to help with construction of the $458 million stadium and surrounding area. Site preparation for the stadium, including demolition of highway ramps, began in early 2020 and continued through the early stages of the COVID-19 pandemic.

On August 17, 2020, former Fortuna Düsseldorf managing director of sports Lutz Pfannenstiel was introduced as sporting director of St. Louis City SC. Bradley Carnell, a former assistant coach at the New York Red Bulls, was named as the team's first head coach in January 2022.

On February 25, 2023, St. Louis City SC played in their first MLS match and defeated Austin FC 3–2 at Q2 Stadium in Austin, Texas. The team won their first home game 3–1 against Charlotte FC on March 4 at CityPark. St. Louis City SC became the first MLS expansion team team to win their first five matches; they also matched the points record to open the season set by the Los Angeles Galaxy in 1996 and Sporting Kansas City in 2012.

On April 1, 2023, St. Louis City SC lost their first game in their history against Minnesota United FC with the score 0–1 in CityPark. The club broke the record for most wins by an MLS expansion club, defeating Sporting Kansas City 4-1 and reaching 17 wins in September. At the end of their inaugural season, St. Louis City SC finished first in the Western Conference and qualified for the 2024 CONCACAF Champions Cup. They were eliminated from the MLS Cup Playoffs by eighth-seeded rivals Sporting Kansas City in the first round after losing the first two games in the best-of-three series.

St. Louis City would begin their 2024 campaign with a five-match undefeated streak, but only won one match. On July 1, 2024, the club fired head coach Bradley Carnell, citing the club's poor performance through the first half of the 2024 season. John Hackworth, the club's Technical Director, was named as the interim head coach.

Historic 2026 Season

=== Unbeaten Streak ===
On October 14, 2026 St. Louis City SC played a match against the Vancouver Whitecaps FC, and the final score was 0-0. The result of a tie extended their unbeaten run to 19 regular-season games, and 21-match unbeaten streak across all of the games. This game helped them write history and set an MLS record for consecutive regular season matches without a loss. Before this historic comeback the club had only six points in their first 10 matches, but this dynasty-like run enabled the team to reach the MLS Cup playoffs.

=== US Open Cup Victory 2026 ===
On October 21, 2026 St. Louis City FC made history by securing their first trophy in the club's history as they won the 2026 US Open Cup. They played the Columbus Crew and beat them in a penalty-kick shootout 5-3 after they ended up drawing 0-0 in the 120 minutes of regulation. The team's goalkeeper Ben Lundt was the hero of the night as he saved Columbus’ opening penalty after Roman Burki got injured. The players kicking the penalties were also a big part of this milestone, going a perfect five-for-five on their kicks.

== Colors, badge, and sponsorship ==
The crest features the iconic Gateway Arch, and the two curved lines symbolize the confluence of North America's two longest rivers, the Mississippi River and the Missouri River, which is located just a few miles north of Downtown St. Louis. Officially, the team color is CITY Red. River Blue, Energy Yellow, and Arch Steel Gray, colors announced by the club in 2022, were later abandoned and are no longer in use. The shade of red can easily be mistaken as a shade of magenta or pink, or bright maroon depending on the lighting.

=== Sponsorship ===
Period	Kit Manufacturer	Shirt Sponsor	Sleeve Sponsor
2023–present	Adidas	Purina	BJC HealthCare

On March 31, 2021, Purina, a pet food maker founded and based in St. Louis, became the club's first jersey sponsor and founding partner. On July 14, 2021, Together Credit Union, a local credit union, became the club's second founding partner and the official banking partner.

== Stadium ==
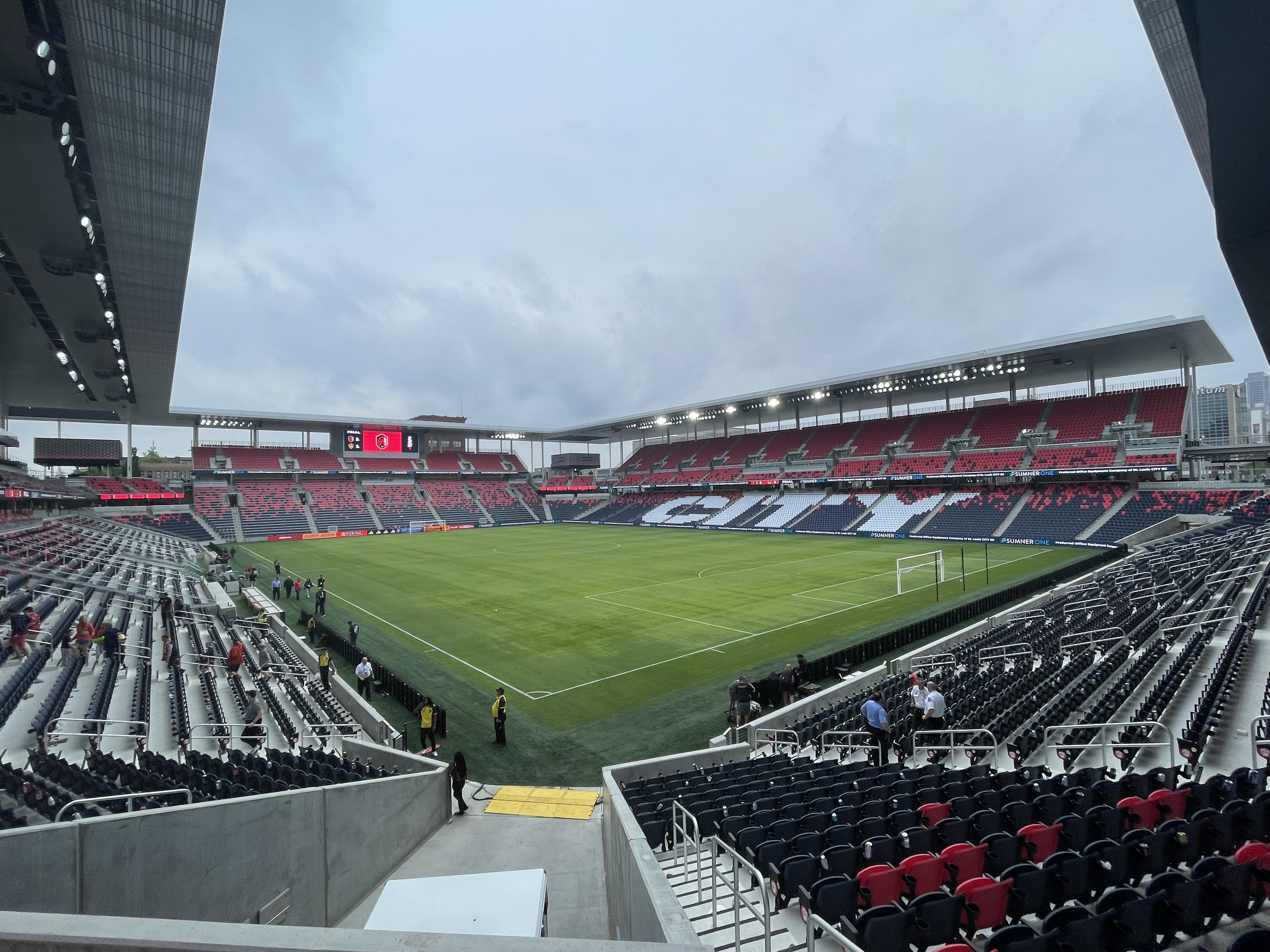
Energizer Park

The team plays in Energizer Park in downtown St. Louis that is the anchor of a 31-acre (13 ha) development area that includes team offices, training facilities, and commercial districts. The stadium is intended to field 17 to 23 soccer games a year and serve as a venue for concerts, high school sports, and more. The design of the stadium is intended to connect the surrounding area and the downtown area together while blending with the neighborhood.

== Ownership and management ==
The St. Louis City SC ownership group consists of Enterprise Holdings Foundation president Carolyn Kindle and female members of the Taylor family (Enterprise Holdings), and is the first female majority-owned team in MLS. The group also includes CEO of World Wide Technology, Jim Kavanaugh and members of the Kavanaugh family.

== Club culture ==
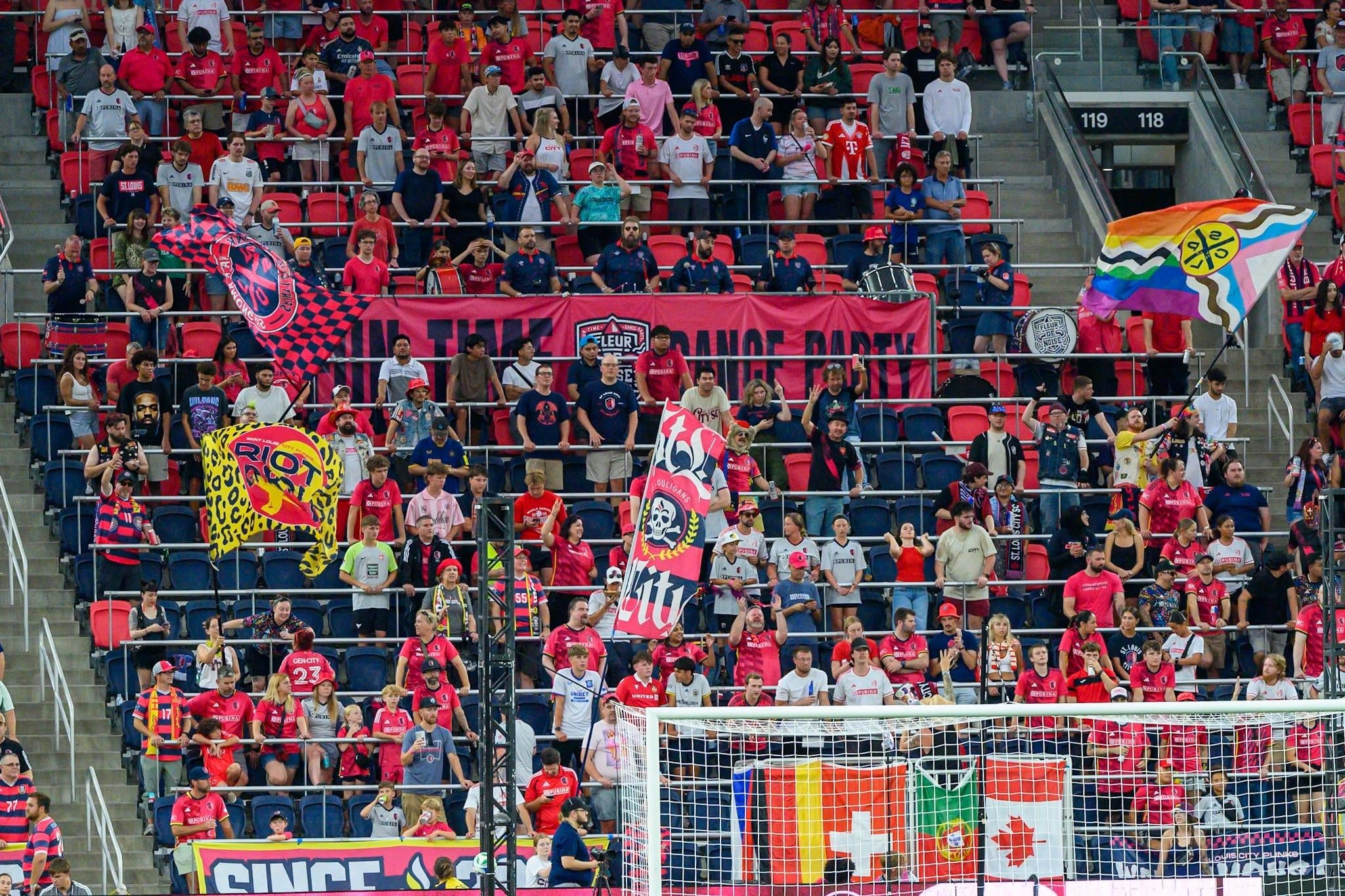
St. Louis City SC supporters in 2025

=== Supporters ===
Many new independent supporters' groups were organized in anticipation of the MLS squad's arrival, supporting City 2 throughout their 2022 campaign. These groups include Saint Louis City Punks, sporting denim vests and Punk rock vibes, as well as the No Nap City Ultras, a supporters' group of parents and their young children, and STL Santos, a supporters' group for Spanish speakers. 2022 also saw the arrival of a new drum corps and supporters' group, the Fleur de Noise, who will take up the role of drumming and leading chants for the supporters.

The oldest active soccer supporters' group in the St. Louis area is the St. Louligans, though they are far from the only supporters' group in St. Louis. Their name references football hooliganism, the disruptive and disorderly behavior of soccer fans, though this type of phenomenon is not generally found among soccer fans in North America. The St. Louligans were founded in 2010 when several local soccer fan groups joined forces at AC St. Louis home games. They have provided strong support for a number of St. Louis area soccer teams, including AC St. Louis, Saint Louis Athletica, St. Louis Lions, Illinois Piasa, and Saint Louis FC.

The new stadium contains a supporters' section with space for more than 3,000 standing spectators, three capo stands, a 257-foot (78 m) long integrated tifo rigging system, a drum riser for drum corps during matches, and a dedicated supporters bar.

In 2026, St. Louis City SC introduced new rules that banned Black Lives Matter displays and the Transgender flag from supporters groups.

== Rivalries ==
=== Chicago Fire FC ===
The Chicago Fire have emerged as a regional rival for St. Louis City SC, mirroring the 160-year sporting and cultural dislike between the two Midwestern cities, most evident in the Cardinals-Cubs rivalry in Major League Baseball and the Blues-Blackhawks rivalry in the National Hockey League. For their first encounters in 2023, the two teams met twice in the space of a week, and Chicago won both matches despite their visitors sending large numbers of traveling supporters. On May 11, 2024, St. Louis beat Chicago for the first time by a score of 3-1 at home in the first meeting between the two sides in the 2024 season.

=== Sporting Kansas City ===
St. Louis City has also developed an early rivalry with Sporting Kansas City. Prior to the first meeting, a St. Louis fan podcast, the Soccer Capitol Podcast, became the center of attention and heightening tensions between supporters. A series of emails from Sporting Kansas City's front office arrived in the inbox of the podcast's Gmail account. The club believed the Soccer Capitol Podcast was infringing on the trademark "The Soccer Capital of America," which was registered to Kansas Training Partners LLC, an affiliate company of Sporting Kansas City. St. Louis City SC won the first match between the two clubs on May 20 at CityPark. On September 30, 2023, St. Louis fans unfurled a huge banner reading 'You're not in Kansas anymore.' The two teams played in their first postseason matchup in the 2023 MLS Cup Playoffs, with Sporting Kansas City (the #8 seed) upsetting the #1 seeded St. Louis in a best-of-three series.

== Players and staff ==
=== Roster ===
As of September 24, 2026

Note: Flags indicate national team as defined under FIFA eligibility rules; some limited exceptions apply. Players may hold more than one non-FIFA nationality.

No.	Pos.	Nation	Player
1	GK	SUI	Roman Bürki (captain; DP)
3	DF	USA	Tahir Reid-Brown
4	DF	SEN	Mamadou Mbacke Fall
5	DF	CAN	Lukas MacNaughton
6	MF	NOR	Conrad Wallem
7	MF	CZE	Tomáš Ostrák
8	MF	USA	Chris Durkin
9	FW	BRA	Rafael Navarro (DP)
11	FW	USA	Simon Becher
12	MF	BRA	Célio Pompeu
14	DF	NOR	Tomas Totland
18	MF	CAN	Charles-Emile Brunet (on loan from Nashville SC)
19	FW	DEN	Carlo Holse (DP)
20	DF	BRA	Rafael Santos
21	MF	USA	Dante Polvara
22	DF	CAN	Kyle Hiebert
23	MF	ROU	Alexandru Mățan

No.	Pos.	Nation	Player
24	MF	USA	Daniel Edelman
27	DF	SEN	Fallou Fall
28	MF	USA	Miguel Perez (HG)
29	FW	USA	Palmer Ault
31	GK	USA	Christian Olivares
32	DF	GER	Timo Baumgartl
33	MF	USA	Tyson Pearce (HG)
39	GK	GER	Ben Lundt
42	FW	USA	Damion Downs (on loan from Southampton)
46	FW	USA	Caden Glover (HG)
59	FW	USA	Mykhi Joyner (HG)
77	FW	KOR	Jeong Sang-bin
80	FW	USA	Brendan McSorley
91	MF	USA	Zach Zengue (on loan from Columbus Crew)
99	DF	MEX	Jaziel Orozco
—	GK	USA	Zack Campagnolo (on loan from Colorado Rapids)

=== Out on loan ===
Note: Flags indicate national team as defined under FIFA eligibility rules; some limited exceptions apply. Players may hold more than one non-FIFA nationality.

No.	Pos.	Nation	Player
15	DF	GHA	Joshua Yaro (on loan to Athletic Club Boise)

=== Technical staff ===
As of March 20, 2026

Role	Name	Nationality
Sporting Director	Corey Wray	Canada
Assistant Sporting Director	Ally Mackay	Scotland
Head Coach	Yoann Damet	France
Assistant Coach	David Sauvry	Canada
Assistant Coach	Marcelo Sarvas	Brazil
Assistant Coach / Individual Development	Baggio Hušidić	Bosnia-Herzegovina
Director of Goalkeeping / Set-piece Coach	Alex Langer	Germany
Director of Scouting	Colin Rooney	United States
First Team Analyst	Mareé Romain	France

=== Head coaches ===
As of November 7, 2026

- Includes regular season, playoff, CONCACAF Champions Cup, Leagues Cup, and U.S. Open Cup games.

Name	Nationality	Tenure	GP	W	D	L	Win %
Bradley Carnell	South Africa	January 5, 2022 – July 1, 2024	62	22	15	25	35.48
John Hackworth (interim)	United States	July 1, 2024 – November 26, 2024	18	7	4	7	38.89
Olof Mellberg	Sweden	November 26, 2024 – May 27, 2025	17	3	5	9	17.65
David Critchley (interim)	England	May 27, 2025 – December 16, 2025	19	6	3	10	31.58
Yoann Damet	France	December 16, 2025 – present	39	18	11	10	46.15

=== Executive staff ===
As of March 6, 2024

Role	Name	Nationality
Owner & CEO	Carolyn Kindle	United States
President & General Manager	Diego Gigliani	Argentina

== Club record and statistics ==
=== Year-by-year ===
As of November 9, 2026

Season	League									Position		Playoffs	USOC	Continental / Other		Average attendance	Top goalscorer(s)	
Season	Pld	W	L	D	GF	GA	GD	Pts	PPG	Conf.	Overall	Playoffs	USOC	Continental / Other		Average attendance	Player(s)	Goals
2023	34	17	12	5	62	45	+17	56	1.65	1st	4th	Rnd 1	Round of 32	LC	Group Stage	22,423	(United States) Nicholas Gioacchini (Brazil) João Klauss	10
2024	34	8	13	13	50	63	−13	37	1.09	12th	24th	DNQ	DNE	CCC LC	R1 R16	22,423	(Germany) Cedric Teuchert	7
2025	34	8	18	8	44	58	−14	32	0.94	13th	24th	DNQ	Round of 16	DNQ		22,423	(Brazil) João Klauss	12
2026	34	15	10	9	59	48	+11	54	1.59	3rd	8th	TBD	Champions	DNQ		22,423	(United States) Simon Becher	10

=== International tournaments ===
The following is a list of results for St. Louis City SC in international competitions. St. Louis City SC's scores are listed first.

Year	Tournament	Round	Opponent	Home	Away	Agg.
2023	Leagues Cup	Group Stage	(United States) Columbus Crew		1–2	
2023	Leagues Cup	Group Stage	(Mexico) América	0–4		
2024	CONCACAF Champions Cup	Round One	(United States) Houston Dynamo FC	2–1	0–1	2–2
2024	Leagues Cup	Group Stage	(United States) FC Dallas	2–1		
2024	Leagues Cup	Group Stage	(Mexico) Juárez	1–1		
2024	Leagues Cup	Round of 32	(United States) Portland Timbers	3–1		
2024	Leagues Cup	Round of 16	(Mexico) América		2–4	
2027	CONCACAF Champions Cup	TBD	TBD			

=== Record by opponent ===
Team	Pld	W	D	L	GF	GA	GD	WPCT
(Mexico) América	2	0	0	2	2	8	−6	0.00
(United States) Columbus Crew	1	0	0	1	1	2	−1	0.00
(United States) FC Dallas	1	1	0	0	2	1	+1	100.00
(United States) Houston Dynamo FC	2	1	0	1	2	2	0	50.00
(Mexico) Juárez	1	0	1	0	1	1	0	0.00
(United States) Portland Timbers	1	1	0	0	3	1	+2	100.00
Total	8	3	1	4	11	15	−4	37.50

Source: Results

== Player records ==
- MLS = Major League Soccer
- PO = MLS Cup playoffs
- OC = U.S. Open Cup
- LC = Leagues Cup
- CCC = CONCACAF Champions Cup

Current players on the St. Louis roster are shown in bold.

As of November 9, 2026

=== Most appearances ===
Rank	Player	Nat.	Period	MLS	PO	OC	LC	CCC	Total
1	**Roman Bürki**	(Switzerland)	2023–	118	2	6	4	2	132
2	Eduard Löwen	(Germany)	2023–2026	84	2	5	6	2	99
3	**Chris Durkin**	(United States)	2024–	76	0	6	4	2	88
4	**Tomáš Ostrák**	(Czech Republic)	2023–	75	1	6	2	2	86
5	**Simon Becher**	(United States)	2024–	74	0	6	4	0	85
5	João Klauss	(Brazil)	2023–2025	79	2	2	0	2	85
5	**Tomas Totland**	(Norway)	2024–	75	0	5	3	1	84
8	**Célio Pompeu**	(Brazil)	2023–	74	2	3	2	2	83
9	**Kyle Hiebert**	(Canada)	2023–	69	2	3	5	0	79
10	Indiana Vassilev	(United States)	2023–2024	63	2	2	6	2	75

=== Top goalscorers ===
Rank	Player	Nat.	Period	MLS	PO	OC	LC	CCC	Total (Note: Numbers in brackets indicate appearances made.)	Ratio
1	João Klauss	(Brazil)	2023–2025	25	0	2	0	0	**27** (85)	0.32
2	Marcel Hartel	(Germany)	2024–2026	18	0	4	2	0	**24** (67)	0.36
3	Eduard Löwen	(Germany)	2023–2026	20	0	2	1	0	**23** (99)	0.23
4	**Simon Becher**	(United States)	2024–	16	0	1	2	0	**19** (85)	0.22
5	Nicholas Gioacchini	(United States)	2023	10	0	0	0	0	**10** (37)	0.27
5	Samuel Adeniran	(United States)	2023–2024	10	0	0	0	0	**10** (41)	0.24
5	Cedric Teuchert	(Germany)	2024–2026	8	0	0	2	0	**10** (49)	0.20
8	**Rafael Navarro**	(Brazil)	2026–	9	0	0	0	0	**9** (12)	0.75
9	**Tomáš Ostrák**	(Czech Republic)	2023–	7	0	1	0	0	**8** (86)	0.09
10	**Célio Pompeu**	(Brazil)	2023–	6	1	0	0	0	**7** (83)	0.08

=== Top assisters ===
Rank	Player	Nat.	Period	MLS	PO	OC	LC	CCC	Total	Ratio
1	Eduard Löwen	(Germany)	2023–2026	16	0	1	3	0	**20** (99)	0.20
2	Marcel Hartel	(Germany)	2024–2026	12	0	1	0	0	**13** (67)	0.19
3	Indiana Vassilev	(United States)	2023–2024	8	0	0	0	1	**9** (75)	0.12
4	**Conrad Wallem**	(Norway)	2025–	7	0	1	0	0	**8** (67)	0.12
4	**Célio Pompeu**	(Brazil)	2023–	5	0	3	0	0	**8** (83)	0.10
4	**Tomas Totland**	(Norway)	2024–	6	0	2	0	0	**8** (85)	0.09
7	Cedric Teuchert	(Germany)	2024–2026	6	0	1	0	0	**7** (49)	0.14
8	**Alexandru Mățan**	(Romania)	2026–	6	0	0	0	0	**6** (14)	0.43
8	**Simon Becher**	(United States)	2024–	6	0	0	0	0	**6** (85)	0.07
8	João Klauss	(Brazil)	2023–2025	6	0	0	0	0	**6** (85)	0.07
8	**Chris Durkin**	(United States)	2024–	6	0	0	0	0	**6** (88)	0.07

== Honors ==
Domestic
Competitions	Titles	Seasons
U.S. Open Cup	1	2026
Western Conference (Regular Season)	1	2023

=== Individual awards ===
Year	Player	Country	Position	Honor
2023	Roman Bürki	Switzerland	Goalkeeper	MLS Goalkeeper of the Year

== Player development ==
=== Reserve team ===
On December 6, 2021, the club announced it would be fielding a reserve team in the new MLS Next Pro league, in the third tier of US Soccer. St. Louis City 2 began play in the 2022 season, despite the MLS side not beginning play until 2023.

=== Academy ===
The St. Louis City SC Academy was announced by the club in August 2020 and joined MLS Next in the 2021–21 season. The academy were granted an expansion team in the United Premier Soccer League in 2022. The team competes in the KY / TN Conference - Premier Division. In the 2023 fall season, the Academy was the runner-up in the UPSL National Finals, falling 2-1 to Chiriaco FC. In the 2024 spring season, the Academy became the UPSL Gateway Premier champions and secured a spot in the National Round of 32.

== See also ==
- Sports in St. Louis
- Soccer in St. Louis
