= Timo Baumgartl =

German footballer (born 1996)

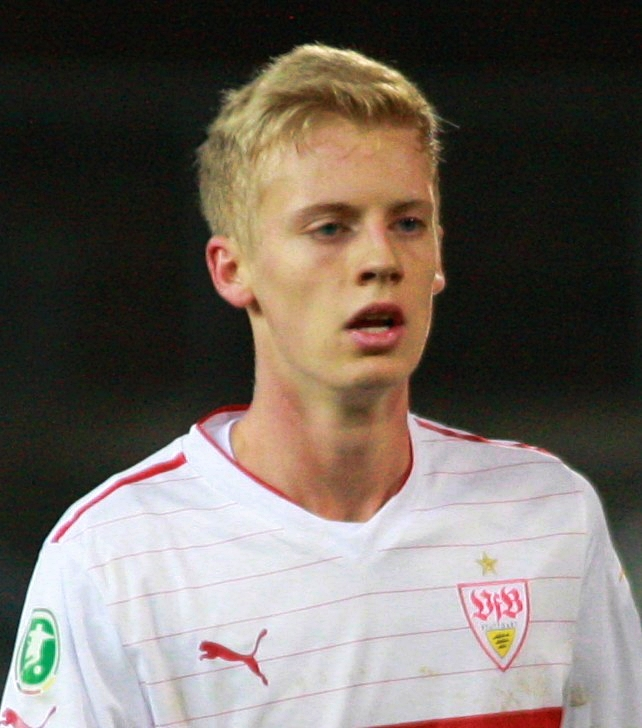
- Baumgartl playing for VfB Stuttgart II in 2013

Personal information
- Date of birth: 4 March 1996 (age 30)
- Place of birth: Böblingen, Germany
- Height: 1.90 m (6 ft 3 in)
- Position: Centre-back

Team information
- Current team: St. Louis City SC
- Number: 32

Youth career
- 2002–2010: GSV Maichingen
- 2010–2011: SSV Reutlingen
- 2011–2014: VfB Stuttgart

Senior career*
Years	Team	Apps	(Gls)
2013–2019	VfB Stuttgart II	24	(3)
2014–2019	VfB Stuttgart	115	(2)
2019–2023	PSV	21	(1)
2021–2023	→ Union Berlin (loan)	33	(1)
2023–2024	Schalke 04	12	(0)
2025–	St. Louis City	55	(1)
2025	St. Louis City 2	1	(0)

International career
2011	Germany U15	2	(0)
2013–2014	Germany U18	3	(0)
2014–2016	Germany U19	5	(0)
2016–2019	Germany U21	20	(1)
Medal record
Men's football
Representing Germany
UEFA European Under-21 Championship
Runner-up	2019 Italy–San Marino
- * Club domestic league appearances and goals as of 18:31, 3 November 2026 (UTC)

Timo Baumgartl (born 4 March 1996) is a German professional footballer who plays as a centre-back for Major League Soccer club St. Louis City SC.

== Club career ==
=== VfB Stuttgart ===
Baumgartl made his debut on 18 December 2013 for VfB Stuttgart II in the 3. Liga against Borussia Dortmund II in a 2–1 home defeat. He played the full game as a centre-back.

He made his Bundesliga debut for the first team of VfB Stuttgart on 8 November 2014 against Werder Bremen. On 26 January 2015, Baumgartl extended his contract with VfB Stuttgart until June 2018. He renewed his contract again until June 2020 on 11 August 2015. On 3 December 2017, Baumgartl signed a new five-year contract with VfB, keeping him at Stuttgart until June 2022.

=== PSV ===
On 25 July 2019, PSV Eindhoven announced the signing of Baumgartl on a five-year deal.

==== Union Berlin (loan) ====
On 1 July 2021, it was announced that Baumgartl returned to Germany to play for Union Berlin on a season-long loan deal with an option to buy. On 15 June 2022, PSV announced that Baumgartl's loan at Union had been extended through the 2022-23 season.

=== Schalke 04 ===
On 26 July 2023, he signed with Schalke 04 on a two-year contract. On 29 August 2024, his contract with Schalke was mutually terminated.

=== St. Louis City SC ===
On 29 November 2024, St. Louis City SC announced the signing of Baumgartl on a two-year contract (through 2026), with a club option for 2027.

== Career statistics ==
As of match played 31 October 2026

Appearances and goals by club, season and competition
Club	Season	League			National cup (Note: Includes DFB-Pokal, KNVB Cup, U.S. Open Cup)		Other		Total	
Club	Season	Division	Apps	Goals	Apps	Goals	Apps	Goals	Apps	Goals
VfB Stuttgart II	2013–14	3. Liga	6	1	—		—		6	1
VfB Stuttgart II	2014–15	3. Liga	16	2	—		—		16	2
VfB Stuttgart II	2015–16	3. Liga	1	0	—		—		1	0
VfB Stuttgart II	2018–19	Regionalliga Südwest	1	0	—		—		1	0
VfB Stuttgart II	Total		24	3	—		—		24	3
VfB Stuttgart	2014–15	Bundesliga	20	0	0	0	—		20	0
VfB Stuttgart	2015–16	Bundesliga	19	0	2	0	—		21	0
VfB Stuttgart	2016–17	2. Bundesliga	29	1	1	0	—		30	1
VfB Stuttgart	2017–18	Bundesliga	29	0	2	0	—		31	0
VfB Stuttgart	2018–19	Bundesliga	18	1	1	0	—		19	1
VfB Stuttgart	Total		115	2	6	0	—		121	2
PSV	2019–20	Eredivisie	13	1	2	0	7 (Note: Appearances in UEFA Europa League)	1	22	2
PSV	2020–21	Eredivisie	8	0	2	0	4	0	14	0
PSV	Total		21	1	4	0	11	1	36	2
Union Berlin (loan)	2021–22	Bundesliga	25	1	5	0	5 (Note: Appearances in UEFA Europa Conference League)	0	35	1
Union Berlin (loan)	2022–23	Bundesliga	8	0	0	0	0	0	8	0
Union Berlin (loan)	Total		33	1	5	0	5	0	43	1
Schalke 04	2023–24	2. Bundesliga	12	0	1	0	—		13	0
St. Louis City	2025	MLS	22	0	2	0	—		24	0
St. Louis City	2026	MLS	33	1	5	0	0	0	38	1
St. Louis City	Total		55	1	7	0	0	0	62	1
St. Louis City 2	2025	MLS Next Pro	1	0	—		—		1	0
Career total			261	6	23	0	16	1	300	9

== Honours ==
St. Louis City SC

- U.S. Open Cup: 2026
