= Marcel Hartel =

German footballer (born 1996)

Personal information
- Date of birth: 19 January 1996 (age 30)
- Place of birth: Cologne, Germany
- Height: 1.76 m (5 ft 9 in)
- Position: Midfielder

Team information
- Current team: Hannover 96
- Number: 10

Youth career
- –2002: SC West Köln
- 2002–2016: 1. FC Köln

Senior career*
Years	Team	Apps	(Gls)
2015–2017	1. FC Köln II	37	(6)
2016–2017	1. FC Köln	8	(0)
2017–2019	Union Berlin	54	(4)
2019–2021	Arminia Bielefeld	55	(1)
2021–2024	FC St. Pauli	98	(24)
2024–2026	St. Louis City SC	59	(18)
2026–	Hannover 96	0	(0)

International career
2017–2018	Germany U21	9	(4)
- * Club domestic league appearances and goals as of 19:57, 11 August 2026 (UTC)

Marcel Hartel (born 19 January 1996) is a German professional footballer who plays as a midfielder for 2. Bundesliga side Hannover 96.

== Club career ==
=== Early career ===
Born in Cologne, Hartel started playing football as a youth for SC West Köln. In 2002, he joined 1. FC Köln's youth system. He was able to move through the club's youth ranks and made his Bundesliga debut on 20 February 2016, in a 1–0 away defeat against Borussia Mönchengladbach. During the 2016–17 season, he made 12 appearances for 1. FC Köln's reserves, scoring three goals and contributing five assists.

=== Union Berlin ===
In May 2017, Union Berlin announced the signing of Hartel on a three-year deal. He scored his first goal for the club in a 1–1 draw with Arminia Bielefeld. On 31 January 2019, he scored against his former side, Köln, after controlling the ball up into the air and hitting a stunning bicycle kick. The goal was voted Goal of the Month by viewers of Sportschau on ARD, and later also Goal of the Year.

=== Arminia Bielefeld ===
On 27 July 2019, after playing a key role in Union Berlin's historic promotion to the Bundesliga, Hartel joined Arminia Bielefeld. In the 2019–20 season, he was part of the title-winning team winning promotion to the Bundesliga. He showed a strong performance during pre-season, and he became one of the undisputed regulars of Arminia at the start of the 2020–21 season. This led him to appear in all the games in the first half of the season. As head coach Uwe Neuhaus was replaced by Frank Kramer in March 2021, Hartel lost his place in midfield. He finished the season with 22 league appearances and one in the cup by the end of the season, as they were eliminated in the first round against Regionalliga side Rot-Weiss Essen.

=== FC St. Pauli ===
Hartel joined 2. Bundesliga club FC St. Pauli on 10 August 2021 on an undisclosed deal.

=== St. Louis City SC ===
On 2 July 2024, Hartel signed for Major League Soccer club St. Louis City SC on a four-year contract as a Designated Player.

=== Hannover 96 ===
On 11 August 2026, Hartel departed St. Louis for personal reasons, halfway through their season and his contract, and returned to Germany to join 2. Bundesliga club Hannover 96 on a three-year contract.

== Career statistics ==
As of match played 2 August 2026

Appearances and goals by club, season and competition
Club	Season	League			National cup (Note: Includes DFB-Pokal, U.S. Open Cup)		Other		Total	
Club	Season	Division	Apps	Goals	Apps	Goals	Apps	Goals	Apps	Goals
1. FC Köln II	2014–15	Regionalliga West	7	0	—		—		7	0
1. FC Köln II	2015–16	Regionalliga West	20	4	—		—		20	4
1. FC Köln II	2016–17	Regionalliga West	12	3	—		—		12	3
1. FC Köln II	Total		39	7	—		—		39	7
1. FC Köln	2015–16	Bundesliga	6	0	—		—		6	0
1. FC Köln	2016–17	Bundesliga	2	0	—		—		2	0
1. FC Köln	Total		8	0	0	0	—		8	0
Union Berlin	2017–18	2. Bundesliga	28	2	2	0	—		30	2
Union Berlin	2018–19	2. Bundesliga	26	2	2	0	2 (Note: Appearances in Bundesliga relegation play-offs)	0	30	2
Union Berlin	Total		54	4	4	0	2	0	60	4
Arminia Bielefeld	2019–20	2. Bundesliga	33	1	2	0	—		35	1
Arminia Bielefeld	2020–21	Bundesliga	22	0	1	0	—		23	0
Arminia Bielefeld	Total		55	1	3	0	—		58	1
FC St. Pauli	2021–22	2. Bundesliga	31	2	3	0	—		34	2
FC St. Pauli	2022–23	2. Bundesliga	34	5	2	0	—		36	5
FC St. Pauli	2023–24	2. Bundesliga	33	17	4	4	—		37	21
FC St. Pauli	Total		98	24	9	4	—		107	28
St. Louis City SC	2024	MLS	9	3	—		4 (Note: Appearances in Leagues Cup)	2	13	5
St. Louis City SC	2025	MLS	34	9	1	1	—		35	10
St. Louis City SC	2026	MLS	16	6	3	3	—		19	9
St. Louis City SC	Total		59	18	4	4	4	2	67	24
Hannover 96	2026–27	2. Bundesliga	0	0	0	0	—		0	0
Career total			313	54	20	8	6	2	339	64

== Honours ==
Arminia Bielefeld

- 2. Bundesliga: 2019–20

FC St. Pauli

- 2. Bundesliga: 2023–24

Individual

- Sportschau Goal of the Month: January 2019
- Sportschau Goal of the Year: 2019
