= Ally Mackay =

Scottish football executive

Personal information
- Date of birth: 20 August 1986 (age 40)
- Place of birth: Bayble, Point, Lewis, Scotland
- Position: Defender

Youth career
- 2005–2006: Partick Thistle

College career
Years	Team	Apps	(Gls)
2007–2009	Evansville Purple Aces	24	(0)

Managerial career
- 2020–2022: Nashville SC (general manager)
- 2023–2025: D.C. United (general manager)
- 2026–: St. Louis City SC (assistant Sporting Director)

Ally Mackay (born 20 August 1986) is a Scottish football executive and former player who is currently Assistant Sporting Director for St. Louis City SC in Major League Soccer.

Prior to his role with St. Louis City, Mackay was the General Manager and Chief Soccer Officer of D.C. United after serving as Assistant General Manager of Nashville SC, both in MLS.

Mackay played American college soccer for the University of Evansville and academy youth football for Partick Thistle.

== Early life and football career ==
Mackay was born in the Outer Hebrides of Scotland, and at the age of 18 moved to Glasgow to play football with Partick Thistle's youth academy, where he ultimately captained the under-19 side. This followed a spell playing in the youth teams of Ross County FC. Instead of going pro, Mackay opted to accept an athletic scholarship to play college soccer for the University of Evansville's men's soccer program. At Evansville, he played three seasons with the program, making 24 appearances.

== Management career ==
Going undrafted in both the 2011 MLS SuperDraft and 2011 MLS Supplemental Draft, Mackay went into sports management, specifically becoming a player agent for the Stellar Group Agency, where he worked as an agent for footballers across the United States and Europe for about 10 years. In 2020, Mackay joined Nashville SC as a general manager, where he helped sign several notable players for the club such as Hany Mukhtar and Walker Zimmerman. In 2023, he was hired by D.C. United as both their general manager and Chief Soccer Officer. He departed the club in September 2025.. On February 5th, St. Louis City SC announcement that the club hiring Ally Mackay as an assistant Sporting Director.
