= Jeong Sang-bin =

South Korean footballer (born 2002)

Personal information
- Date of birth: 1 April 2002 (age 24)
- Place of birth: Cheonan, South Korea
- Height: 1.75 m (5 ft 9 in)
- Positions: Winger; right wing-back

Team information
- Current team: St. Louis City
- Number: 77

Youth career
- 2011: Cheonan Elementary School
- 2012–2014: Daejeon Jungang Elementary School
- 2015–2020: Suwon Samsung Bluewings (Note: Played for Maetan Middle School from 2015 to 2017, and Maetan High School from 2018 to 2020, which were academies of Suwon Samsung Bluewings.)

Senior career*
Years	Team	Apps	(Gls)
2020–2021	Suwon Samsung Bluewings	28	(6)
2022–2023	Wolverhampton Wanderers	0	(0)
2022–2023	→ Grasshopper (loan)	13	(0)
2022–2023	→ Grasshopper II (loan)	4	(2)
2023–2025	Minnesota United	70	(7)
2025–	St. Louis City	28	(3)
2026–	St. Louis City 2	1	(0)

International career^{‡}
2017–2019	South Korea U17	13	(8)
2021–	South Korea U23	9	(3)
2021–	South Korea	3	(1)
- * Club domestic league appearances and goals as of 20 September 2026 ‡ National team caps and goals as of 9 September 2025

- Jeong Sang-bin
- Hangul: 정상빈
- RR: Jeong Sangbin
- MR: Chŏng Sangbin

Jeong Sang-bin (Korean: 정상빈; born 1 April 2002) is a South Korean professional footballer who plays as a winger for Major League Soccer club St. Louis City and the South Korea national team.

== Club career ==
On 28 January 2022, Jeong joined Premier League club Wolverhampton Wanderers and was immediately loaned to Grasshopper in Swiss Super League. However, he only made 15 appearances with the Swiss club, including five starts, due to frequent injuries. On 17 March 2023, Grasshopper and Wolves mutually agreed to terminate Jeong's loan early.

On 22 March 2023, Jeong officially joined Major League Soccer side Minnesota United for an undisclosed fee, signing a three-year contract, with a club option for the 2026 season.

On 21 July 2025, St. Louis City announced they had acquired Jeong in a cash-for-player trade with Minnesota United for $1.6 million and up to $400,000 in conditional cash based on performance incentives.

== International career ==
Jeong made his debut for the South Korean senior national team on 9 June 2021, in a World Cup qualifier against Sri Lanka, scoring one of the goals in the 5–0 victory, which was also his first international goal.

== Career statistics ==
=== Club ===
As of 20 September 2026

Appearances and goals by club, season and competition
Club	Season	League			National cup (Note: Includes Korean FA Cup, Swiss Cup, U.S. Open Cup)		Continental		Other		Total	
Club	Season	Division	Apps	Goals	Apps	Goals	Apps	Goals	Apps	Goals	Apps	Goals
Suwon Samsung Bluewings	2020	K League 1	0	0	0	0	2 (Note: Appearances in AFC Champions League)	0	—		2	0
Suwon Samsung Bluewings	2021	K League 1	28	6	1	0	—		—		29	6
Suwon Samsung Bluewings	Total		28	6	1	0	2	0	—		31	6
Wolverhampton Wanderers	2021–22	Premier League	0	0	0	0	—		—		0	0
Grasshopper (loan)	2021–22	Swiss Super League	6	0	0	0	—		—		6	0
Grasshopper (loan)	2022–23	Swiss Super League	7	0	2	0	—		—		9	0
Grasshopper (loan)	Total		13	0	2	0	—		—		15	0
Grasshopper II (loan)	2021–22	Swiss 1. Liga	1	0	—		—		—		1	0
Grasshopper II (loan)	2022–23	Swiss 1. Liga	3	2	—		—		—		3	2
Grasshopper II (loan)	Total		4	2	—		—		—		4	2
Minnesota United	2023	Major League Soccer	23	1	3	0	—		3 (Note: Appearances in Leagues Cup)	0	29	1
Minnesota United	2024	Major League Soccer	32	6	—		—		3 (Note: Appearances in MLS Cup playoffs)	0	35	6
Minnesota United	2025	Major League Soccer	15	0	3	0	—		—		18	0
Minnesota United	Total		70	7	6	0	—		6	0	82	7
St. Louis City	2025	Major League Soccer	9	1	—		—		—		9	1
St. Louis City	2026	Major League Soccer	19	2	3	2	—		—		22	4
St. Louis City	Total		28	3	3	2	—		—		31	5
Career total			143	18	12	2	2	0	6	0	163	20

=== International ===
Scores and results list South Korea's goal tally first.

List of international goals scored by Jeong Sang-bin
No.	Date	Venue	Opponent	Score	Result	Competition
1	9 June 2021	Goyang Stadium, Goyang, South Korea	Sri Lanka	5–0	5–0	2022 FIFA World Cup qualification
