= Jaziel Orozco =

Mexican footballer (born 2004)

Personal information
- Full name: Jaziel Alberto Orozco Landeros
- Date of birth: 2 June 2004 (age 22)
- Place of birth: Ciudad Juárez, Chihuahua, Mexico
- Height: 5 ft 9 in (1.75 m)
- Positions: Defender; defensive midfielder

Team information
- Current team: St. Louis City
- Number: 99

Youth career
- 2019–2021: Real Salt Lake

Senior career*
Years	Team	Apps	(Gls)
2021–2022	Real Monarchs	39	(0)
2022–2024	Real Salt Lake	5	(0)
2023	→ Santos Laguna U20 (loan)	10	(0)
2023–2024	→ Larne (loan)	26	(0)
2024	Real Monarchs	10	(1)
2025–	St. Louis City 2	19	(0)
2025–	St. Louis City	7	(1)
- * Club domestic league appearances and goals as of October 22, 2025

Jaziel Alberto Orozco Landeros (Note: In this Spanish name, the first or paternal surname is Orozco and the second or maternal family name is Landeros.) (born 2 June 2004) is a Mexican professional footballer who currently plays as a defensive midfielder for Major League Soccer club St. Louis City.

== Career ==
Born in Ciudad Juárez, Orozco was raised in El Paso, Texas. He is the son of former professional player, Alberto Orozco. Prior to joining the Real Salt Lake youth setup, Orozco had participated in trials with Liga MX clubs Tigres UANL and Santos Laguna. He also played with Intercups MX, a club side which played in tournaments around the world and the Dallas Cup. In 2019, Orozco was selected to join a trial for the Real Salt Lake youth academy and passed.

On October 4, 2020, Orozco was called in to Real Monarchs, an affiliate club of Real Salt Lake, for their match against El Paso Locomotive but did not come off the bench. On April 7, 2021, Orozco received his first appearance with the main team in their pre-season match against Phoenix Rising. He then made his professional debut on May 8, 2021, for Real Monarchs in their USL Championship opener against San Antonio FC, starting in the 2–2 draw. Following the match, Orozco signed a professional contract with Real Monarchs.

On January 13, 2022, Orozco signed a homegrown player contract with Major League Soccer side Real Salt Lake.

On March 26, 2022, Orozco made his MLS debut for Real Salt Lake, after being subbed on at half-time for defender Erik Holt in a 1–0 loss away at Sporting Kansas City.

On February 3, 2023, Orozco joined Mexican club Santos Laguna on a season-long loan. The loan deal was terminated in August of the same year, with the defender subsequently joining NIFL Premiership side Larne on loan for the rest of the 2023–24 season: the player was granted international clearance on August 31.

On September 2, 2023, Orozco made his debut for Larne, starting in a 4–0 league win over Newry City.

On January 1, 2025, he signed his permanent contract with St. Louis City 2.

On July 18, 2025, he signed his permanent contract with first team St. Louis City SC.

== Career statistics ==
As of match played 22 July 2025

Appearances and goals by club, season and competition
Club	Season	League			Cup		Continental		Other		Total	
Club	Season	Division	Apps	Goals	Apps	Goals	Apps	Goals	Apps	Goals	Apps	Goals
Real Monarchs	2021	USL Championship	24	0	—		—		—		24	0
Real Monarchs	2022	MLS Next Pro	15	0	—		—		—		15	0
Real Monarchs	Total		39	0	—		—		—		39	0
Real Salt Lake	2022	Major League Soccer	4	0	1	0	—		—		5	0
Larne	2023–24	NIFL Premiership	1	0	0	0	0	0	0	0	1	0
St. Louis City 2	2025	MLS Next Pro	12	0	0	0	0	0	0	0	12	0
St. Louis City SC (loan)	2025	Major League Soccer	2	0	0	0	0	0	0	0	2	0
St. Louis City SC	2025	Major League Soccer	1	0	0	0	0	0	0	0	1	0
Career total			59	0	1	0	0	0	0	0	59	0

== Honours ==
Larne

- County Antrim Shield: 2023-24
- NIFL Premiership: 2023-24
