= Célio Pompeu =

Brazilian footballer (born 1999)

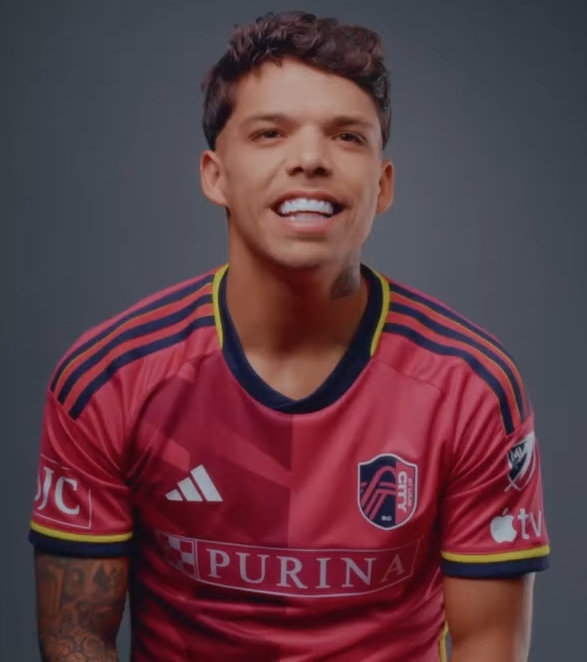
- Pompeu with St. Louis City SC in 2024

Personal information
- Full name: Célio Antônio Pompeu Pinheiro Martins
- Date of birth: 10 December 1999 (age 26)
- Place of birth: Fortaleza, Brazil
- Height: 1.78 m (5 ft 10 in)
- Position: Winger

Team information
- Current team: St. Louis City
- Number: 12

Youth career
- 2009–2011: Ceará
- 2011: Botafogo
- Fortaleza
- Ceará
- 2019: Cedar Stars Rush

College career
Years	Team	Apps	(Gls)
2019–2021	VCU Rams	21	(8)

Senior career*
Years	Team	Apps	(Gls)
2022–2023	St. Louis City 2	27	(5)
2023–	St. Louis City	71	(6)
- * Club domestic league appearances and goals as of October 22, 2025

Célio Antônio Pompeu Pinheiro Martins (born 10 December 1999) is a Brazilian professional footballer who plays as a winger for St. Louis City in Major League Soccer.

== Club ==
Pompeu began his professional career with MLS Next Pro team St. Louis City 2 in 2022, helping the club to win the regular-season Western Conference Championship that same year. In 2022, Pompeu had the most successful dribbles in the league with 49.

On November 18, 2022, Pompeu joined St. Louis City SC after having his MLS option exercised for the 2023 season. On April 26, 2024, Pompeu signed a new contract with the club through the 2026 season, with an option for 2027.

Pompeu was sidelined for last half of the 2024 season after suffering an ankle dislocation and fibula fracture during a match against FC Dallas on June 15, 2024.

== Career statistics ==
As of match played 16 June 2024

Appearances and goals by club, season and competition
Club	Season	League			National cup		Continental		Other		Total	
Club	Season	Division	Apps	Goals	Apps	Goals	Apps	Goals	Apps	Goals	Apps	Goals
St. Louis City 2	2022	MLS Next Pro	24	5	2 (Note: Appearances in US Open Cup)	0	—		3 (Note: Appearances in MLS Next Pro playoffs)	2	29	7
St. Louis City 2	2023	MLS Next Pro	3	0	—		—		—		3	0
St. Louis City 2	Total		27	5	2	0	0	0	3	2	32	7
St. Louis City SC	2023	MLS	26	1	2	0	—		4 (Note: Appearances in Leagues Cup and MLS Cup playoffs)	1	32	2
St. Louis City SC	2024	MLS	17	3	—		2 (Note: Appearances in CONCACAF Champions Cup)	0	—		19	3
St. Louis City SC	Total		43	4	2	0	2	0	4	1	51	5
Career total			70	9	4	0	2	0	7	3	83	12

== Honours ==
St. Louis City 2

- Western Conference (regular season): 2022
- Western Conference: 2022

St. Louis City SC

- Western Conference (regular season): 2023
