= Tomas Totland =

Norwegian footballer (born 1999)

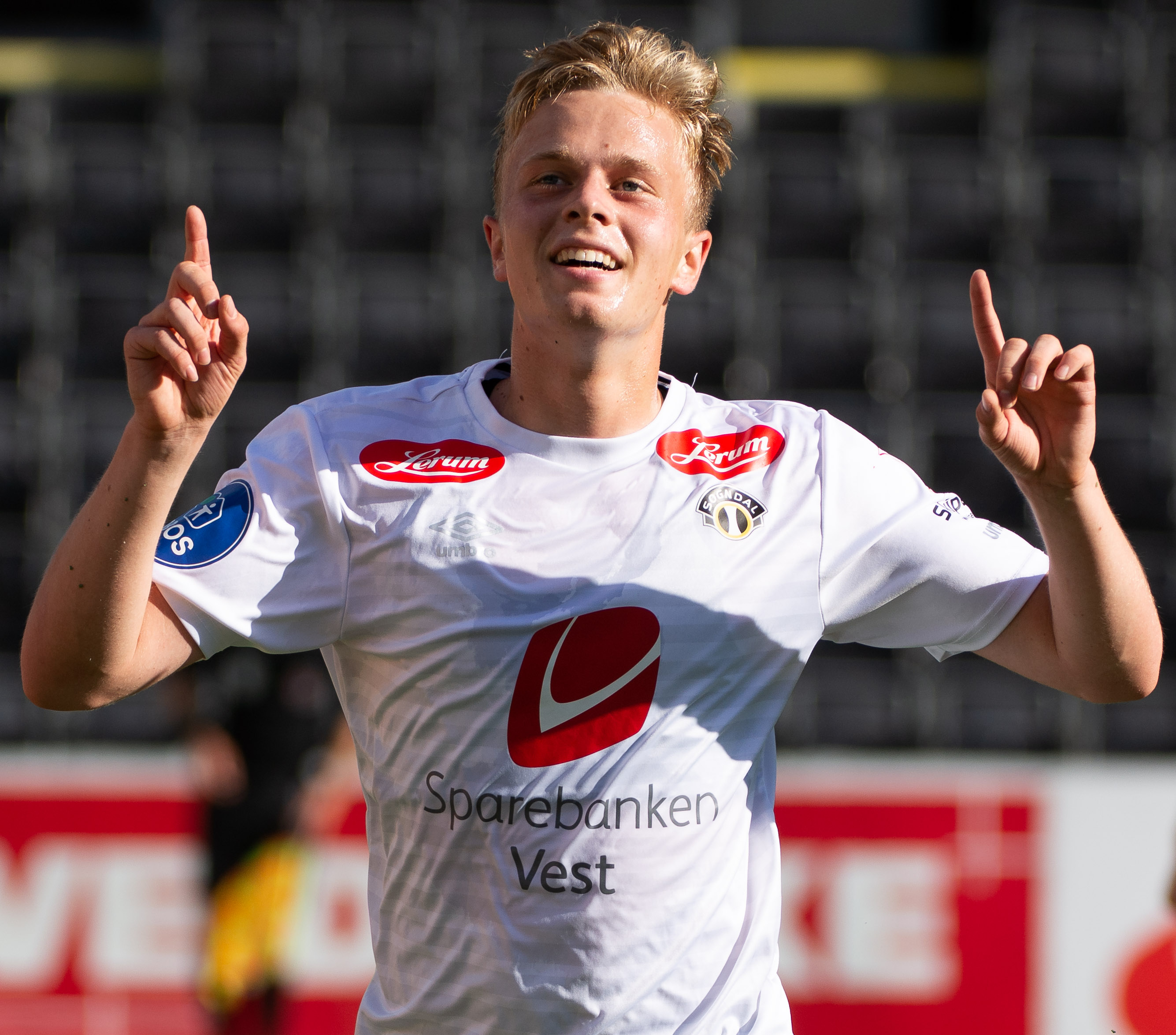
- Totland with Sogndal in 2020

Personal information
- Full name: Tomas Olai Totland
- Date of birth: 28 September 1999 (age 27)
- Place of birth: Bergen, Norway
- Height: 1.80 m (5 ft 11 in)
- Position: Right-back

Team information
- Current team: St. Louis City
- Number: 14

Youth career
- Fana

Senior career*
Years	Team	Apps	(Gls)
2015–2016	Fana	30	(1)
2017–2020	Sogndal	72	(7)
2017	→ Fana (loan)	8	(1)
2021	Tromsø	27	(5)
2022–2023	Häcken	44	(1)
2024–	St. Louis City	47	(2)
2026–	St. Louis City 2	1	(0)

International career^{‡}
2017	Norway U18	3	(0)
2020	Norway U20	1	(0)
2018–2019	Norway U21	3	(0)
- * Club domestic league appearances and goals as of 22 October 2025 ‡ National team caps and goals as of 9 May 2021

Tomas Olai Totland (born 28 September 1999) is a Norwegian professional footballer who plays as a right back for Major League Soccer club St. Louis City.

== Career ==
He started his career in Fana, playing on the senior team in 2015 before joining Sogndal in the winter of 2017. He was loaned back to Fana until the summer of 2017. The same year he became a Norway youth international player. In 2021 Totland went on to Tromsø IL and made his Eliteserien debut in May 2021 against Bodø/Glimt.

Totland signed with Major League Soccer club, Saint Louis City SC in December 2023.

== International career ==
He can represent both Norway, his native country, and the United States, on his mother's side. He is a youth international for Norway.

On 6 November 2018, he was selected for his first Norway U21 national team squad for the match against Turkey U21 on 20 November. He played his first U21 international match for Norway against Turkey on 20 November 2018.

Following Nicholas Mickelson withdrawal due to injury, he was added to Norway's squad for the 2019 FIFA U-20 World Cup in Poland.

== Personal life ==
Totland was born in Norway to a Norwegian father and American mother and holds dual-citizenship.

== Honours ==
BK Häcken

- Allsvenskan: 2022
