= Tomáš Ostrák =

Czech footballer (born 2000)

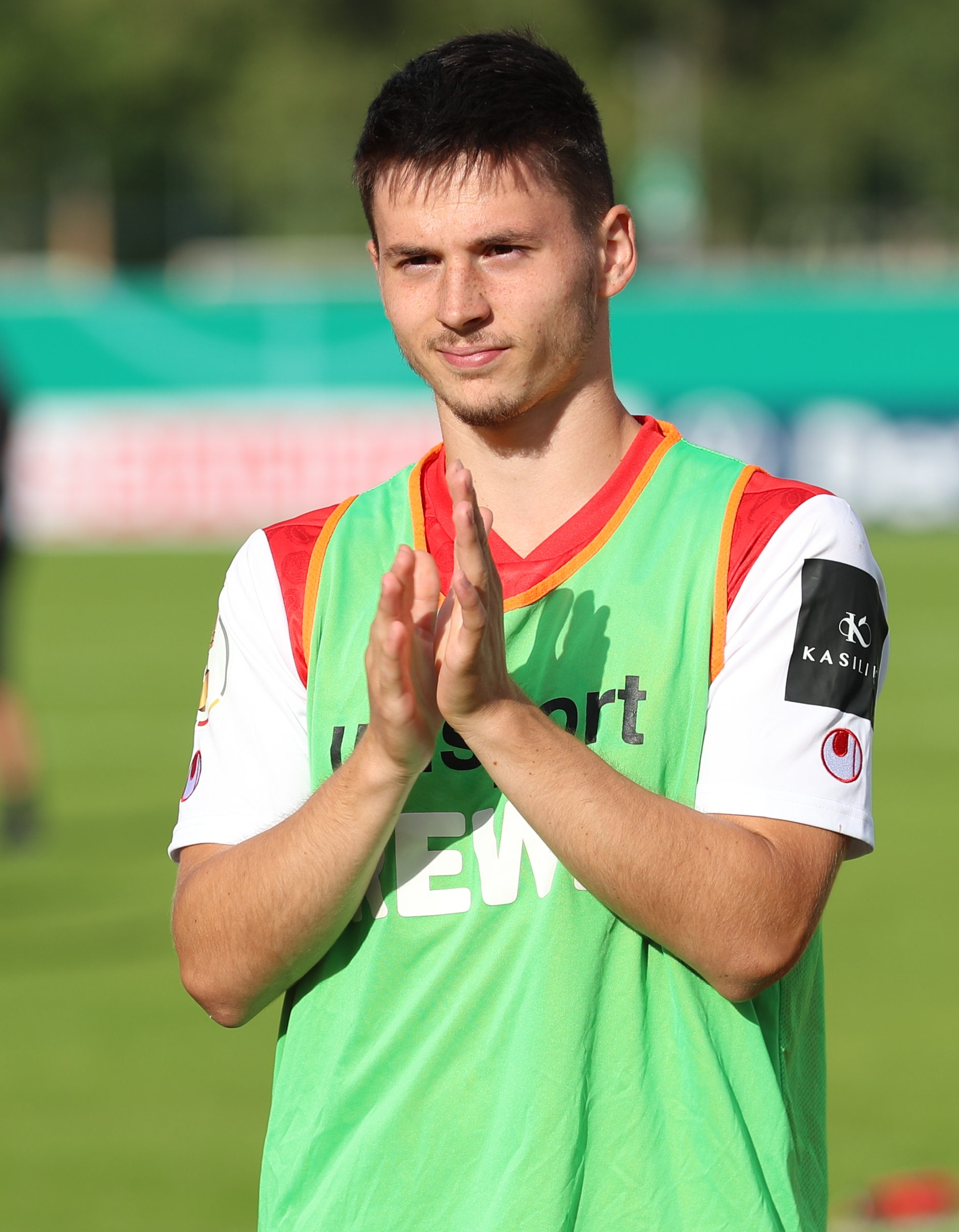
- Ostrák in 2021

Personal information
- Date of birth: 5 February 2000 (age 26)
- Place of birth: Frýdek-Místek, Czech Republic
- Height: 1.76 m (5 ft 9 in)
- Position: Midfielder

Team information
- Current team: St. Louis City SC
- Number: 7

Youth career
- 2016: MFK Frýdek-Místek
- 2016–2019: 1. FC Köln

Senior career*
Years	Team	Apps	(Gls)
2019–2022	1. FC Köln	5	(0)
2019–2020	→ TSV Hartberg (loan)	6	(0)
2020–2021	→ MFK Karviná (loan)	26	(1)
2022	St. Louis City 2	7	(1)
2023–	St. Louis City SC	65	(5)

International career^{‡}
2017	Czech Republic U17	3	(0)
2018–2019	Czech Republic U19	5	(0)
2020–	Czech Republic U21	5	(1)
- * Club domestic league appearances and goals as of 30 April 2023 ‡ National team caps and goals as of 22:02, 22 October 2025 (UTC)

Tomáš Ostrák (born 5 February 2000) is a Czech professional footballer who plays as a midfielder for Major League Soccer club St. Louis City SC.

== Club career ==
Ostrák began his career at the Czech club MFK Frýdek-Místek. In 2016, he joined the youth academy of Bundesliga side 1. FC Köln. In January 2019, he was given the opportunity to train with the club's first team squad by manager Markus Anfang. Ostrák later spent two seasons on loan: during the 2019–20 season, he played for the Austrian club TSV Hartberg and, during the 2020–2021 season, for MFK Karviná in the Czech Republic.

On 28 August 2021 Ostrák made his debut appearance for Köln in a 2–1 home win against VfL Bochum. He came on as a substitute and provided and assisted on a goal by Tim Lemperle. In February 2022, it was announced that Ostrák would not renew his contract with Köln and join the Major League Soccer club St. Louis City SC, who would begin play in 2023, joining the second team first in July 2022.

== International career ==
Ostrák has represented the Czech Republic as a youth international. Starting in 2017, he has played for his country's under-17, under-19, and under-21 teams.

== Honours ==
St. Louis City SC

- Western Conference (regular season): 2023
