= Ben Lundt =

German footballer (born 1995)

Personal information
- Full name: Benjamin Maximilian Lundt
- Date of birth: 24 September 1995 (age 31)
- Place of birth: Berlin, Germany
- Height: 1.98 m (6 ft 6 in)
- Position: Goalkeeper

Team information
- Current team: St. Louis City SC
- Number: 39

Youth career
- 2011–2013: Hertha BSC

College career
Years	Team	Apps	(Gls)
2015	Lenoir–Rhyne Bears	5	(0)
2016–2018	Akron Zips	64	(0)

Senior career*
Years	Team	Apps	(Gls)
2013–2015	Hertha BSC II	3	(0)
2017	Reading United	2	(0)
2019–2021	FC Cincinnati	0	(0)
2019–2020	→ Louisville City (loan)	27	(0)
2021	→ Phoenix Rising (loan)	9	(0)
2022	Phoenix Rising	33	(0)
2023–	St. Louis City	13	(0)
2023–	→ St. Louis City 2 (loan)	6	(0)
- * Club domestic league appearances and goals as of October 22, 2025

Benjamin Maximilian Lundt (born 24 September 1995) is a German professional footballer who plays as a goalkeeper for St. Louis City SC of Major League Soccer.

== Career ==
Lundt was selected by FC Cincinnati with the 37th selection in the 2019 MLS SuperDraft.

On 9 February 2019, Lundt joined USL Championship side Louisville City FC on loan ahead of the 2019 season.

On 6 May 2021, Lundt joined Phoenix Rising FC for the 2021 USL Championship season.

Following the 2021 season, Cincinnati declined their contract option on Lundt. Lundt then signed a multi-year contract with Phoenix Rising FC on 24 January 2022.

In January 2023, he joined St. Louis City SC in Major League Soccer.

== Honours ==
St. Louis City SC

- Western Conference (regular season): 2023
- U.S. Open Cup: 2026

Individual

- USL Championship All League First Team: 2020
- USL Championship Goalkeeper Of The Year: 2020
