= Conrad Wallem =

Norwegian footballer (born 2000)

Personal information
- Full name: Conrad Wallem
- Date of birth: 9 June 2000 (age 26)
- Place of birth: Tønsberg, Norway
- Height: 1.80 m (5 ft 11 in)
- Position: Midfielder

Team information
- Current team: St. Louis City
- Number: 6

Youth career
- –2013: Husøy & Foynland
- 2013–2015: Nøtterøy
- 2016: Tønsberg

Senior career*
Years	Team	Apps	(Gls)
2016–2018	Tønsberg	40	(11)
2018–2020	Arendal	53	(10)
2021–2023	Odd	71	(8)
2021–2022	Odd II	8	(1)
2023–2026	Slavia Prague	31	(6)
2025	→ St. Louis City (loan)	32	(1)
2025	→ St. Louis City 2 (loan)	1	(0)
2026–	St. Louis City	0	(0)

International career
2019	Norway U19	2	(0)
- * Club domestic league appearances and goals as of 9 January 2026

Conrad Wallem (born 9 June 2000) is a Norwegian professional footballer who plays as a midfielder for Major League Soccer club St. Louis City.

== Club career ==
On 5 July 2023, Wallem signed a four-year contract with Czech side Slavia Prague.

On 17 January 2025, Wallem joined Major League Soccer club St. Louis City on a one-year loan deal with an option to make the transfer permanent.
