= Brendan McSorley =

American soccer player (born 2002)

Personal information
- Full name: Brendan McSorley
- Date of birth: February 1, 2002 (age 24)
- Place of birth: Randolph, New Jersey, U.S.
- Height: 1.80 m (5 ft 11 in)
- Position: Forward

Team information
- Current team: St. Louis City SC
- Number: 80

Youth career
- 2020: Delbarton School
- Player Development Academy

College career
Years	Team	Apps	(Gls)
2020–2023	Providence Friars	62	(23)

Senior career*
Years	Team	Apps	(Gls)
2021	New York Red Bulls U-23	4	(0)
2023	FC Motown	10	(5)
2024–	St. Louis City SC	9	(2)
2024–	→ St. Louis City 2 (loan)	49	(18)
- * Club domestic league appearances and goals as of October 22, 2025

Brendan McSorley (born February 1, 2002) is an American professional soccer player who plays for Major League Soccer club St. Louis City SC.

Raised in Randolph, New Jersey, McSorley played prep soccer at Delbarton School.
