= Fallou Fall =

Senegalese footballer (born 2004)

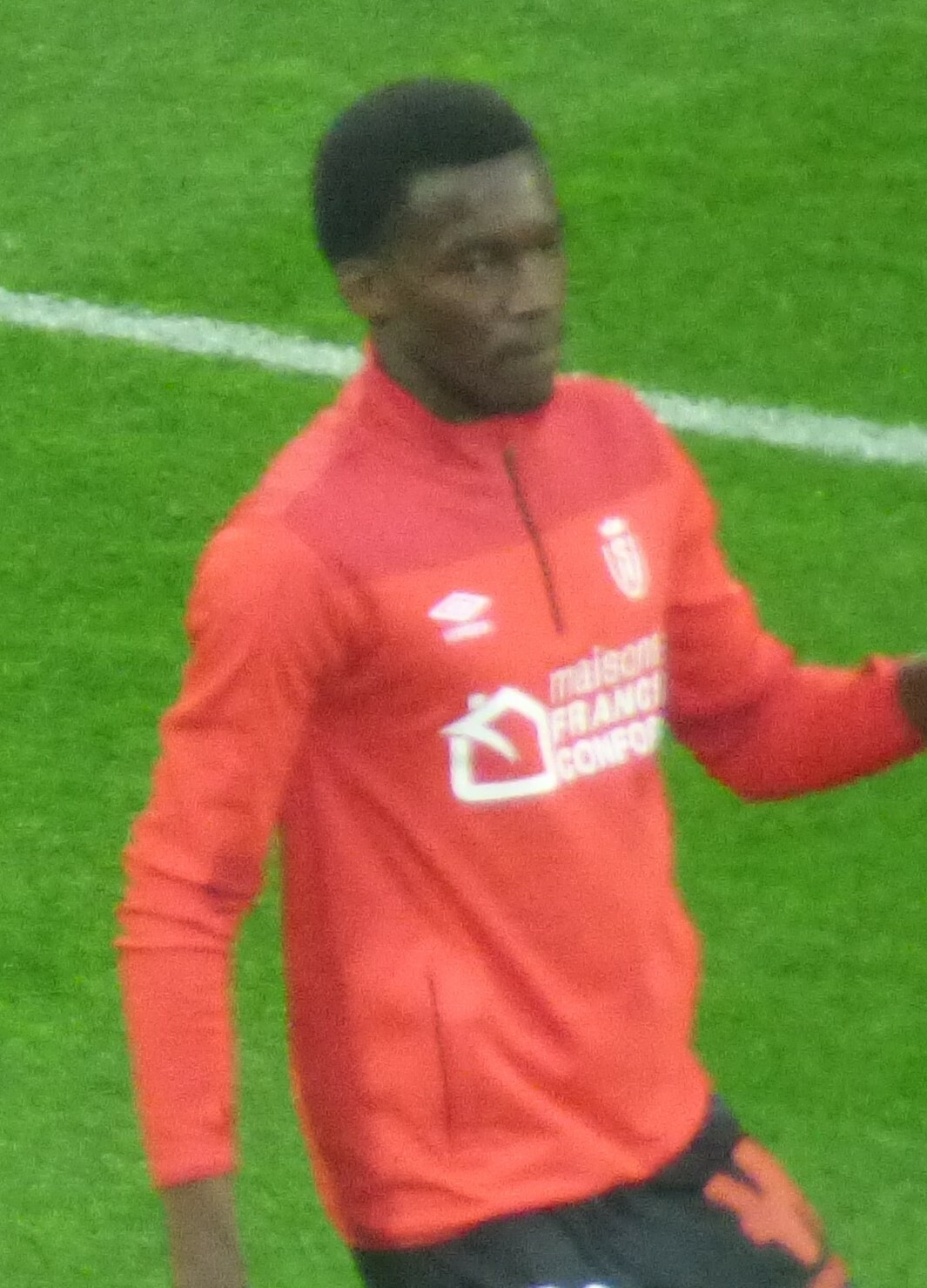
- Fall in 2023

Personal information
- Date of birth: 15 April 2004 (age 22)
- Place of birth: Rufisque, Senegal
- Height: 1.92 m (6 ft 4 in)
- Position: Centre-back

Team information
- Current team: St. Louis City
- Number: 27

Senior career*
Years	Team	Apps	(Gls)
2022–2023	Grafičar	14	(1)
2023–2025	Reims II	24	(1)
2023–2025	Reims	1	(0)
2024–2025	→ Fredrikstad (loan)	16	(2)
2025	Fredrikstad	5	(1)
2025–	St. Louis City	8	(0)

International career
2022	Senegal U23	2	(0)
- * Club domestic league appearances and goals as of 22 October 2025

Fallou Fall (born 15 April 2004) is a Senegalese professional footballer who plays as a centre-back for Major League Soccer club St. Louis City.

== Club career ==
On 8 July 2022, Fall signed a professional contract with the Serbian club Grafičar on a three-year contract. He began his senior career in the Serbian First League for the 2022–23 season, making 14 appearances and scoring 1 goal. On 27 January 2023, he transferred to the French club Reims until 2027 and was initially assigned to their reserves. He made his professional debut with Reims in a 3–0 Ligue 1 loss to Lyon on 27 May 2023.

On 10 July 2024, Fall was loaned to Eliteserien club Fredrikstad for the remainder of the season.

On 28 April 2025, Fall signed a permanent deal with Fredrikstad.

On July 15, 2025, Fall signed a permanent deal with St. Louis City.

== International career ==
Fall is a youth international for Senegal, having played for the Senegal U23s.

== Honours ==
Fredrikstad

- Norwegian Cup: 2024

Individual

- Eliteserien Player of the Month: April 2025
