= Lucas Hufnagel =

Georgian professional footballer (born 1994)

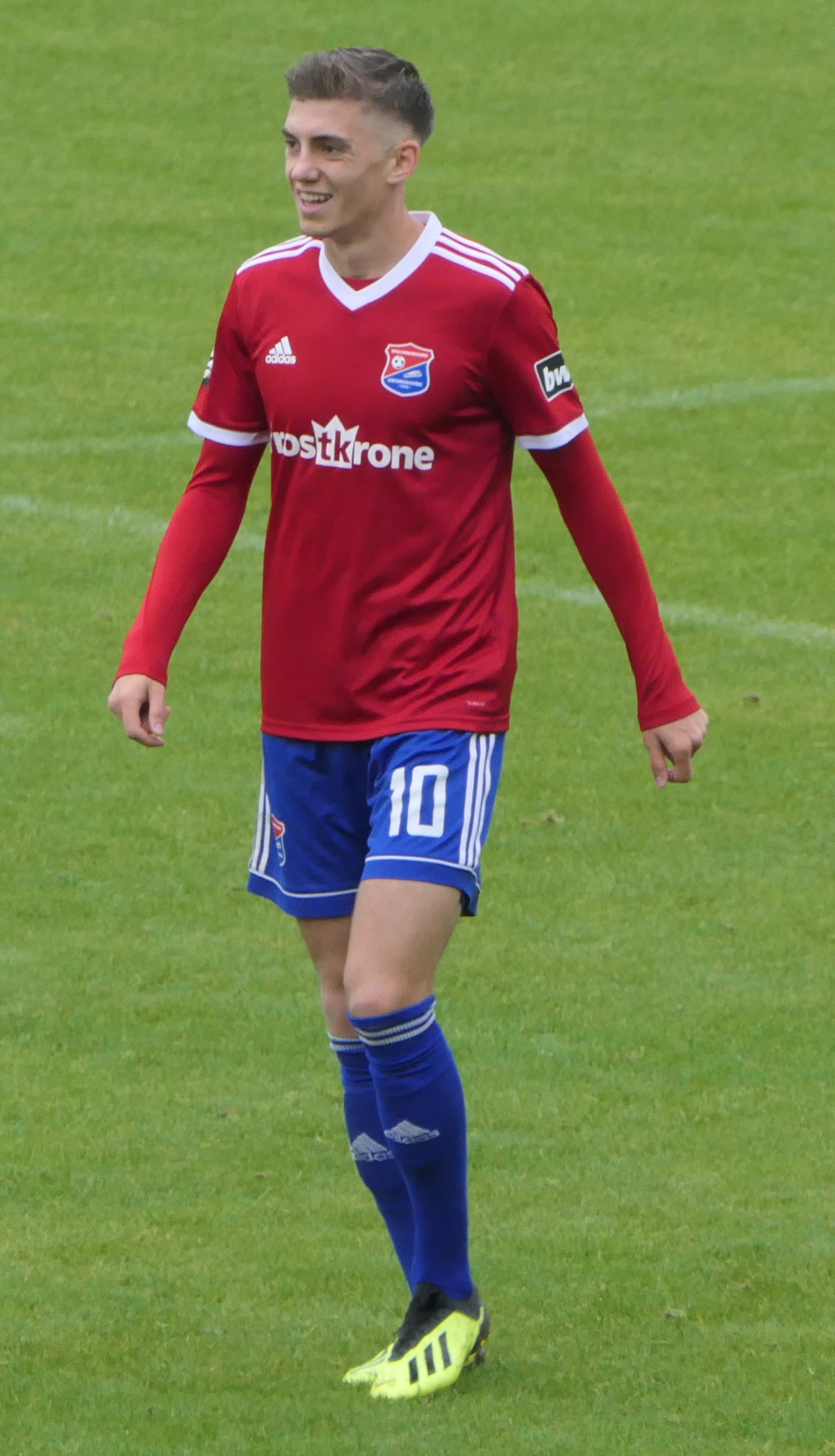
- Hufnagel playing for SpVgg Unterhaching in 2018

Personal information
- Full name: Lucas Hufnagel
- Date of birth: 29 January 1994 (age 32)
- Place of birth: Munich, Germany
- Height: 1.84 m (6 ft 0 in)
- Position: Midfielder

Team information
- Current team: SV Donaustauf
- Number: 8

Youth career
- 1999–2001: TSV Milbertshofen
- 2001–2011: Bayern Munich
- 2011–2012: FC Ingolstadt
- 2012–2013: SpVgg Unterhaching

Senior career*
Years	Team	Apps	(Gls)
2012–2015	SpVgg Unterhaching	48	(4)
2014	SpVgg Unterhaching II	3	(1)
2015–2018	SC Freiburg	19	(1)
2015–2016	SC Freiburg II	16	(4)
2017–2018	→ 1. FC Nürnberg (loan)	16	(0)
2017–2018	→ 1. FC Nürnberg II (loan)	5	(1)
2018–2021	SpVgg Unterhaching	86	(6)
2021–	SV Donaustauf	44	(13)

International career^{‡}
2010–2011	Georgia U17	10	(0)
2012–2013	Georgia U19	5	(0)
2015–2017	Georgia	2	(0)
- * Club domestic league appearances and goals as of 11:09, 24 September 2022 (UTC) ‡ National team caps and goals as of 21 November 2017

Lucas Hufnagel (born 29 January 1994) is a Georgian professional footballer who plays as a midfielder for Bayernliga club SV Donaustauf and the Georgia national team

== Club career ==
Hufnagel made his debut for SpVgg Unterhaching on 6 April 2013, in a 3. Liga match against Karlsruher SC. this was his only appearance during the 2012–13 season. During the 2013–14 season, he scored a goal in 18 appearances. His only goal came against VfL Osnabrück in a 3–0 league win. During the 2014–15 season, Hufnagel player for both the first and reserve teams. He scored three goals in 29 appearances for the first team and a goal in three appearances for the reserve team.

Hufnagel transferred to SC Freiburg for the 2015–16 season. He made his debut in the German Cup on 9 August 2015.

During the 2016–17 winter transfer window in 2017, Hufnagel joined 1. FC Nürnberg on a loan deal until the end of the season. In June, his loan was extended for the 2017–18 season.

In July 2018, Hufnagel returned to his former club Unterhaching signing a three-year contract.

== International career ==
Hufnagel was born and raised in Germany to a mother of Georgian descent. He was called up for and plays for Georgia.

== Career statistics ==
As of 2 July 2018

Appearances and goals by club, season and competition
Club	Season	League			Cup^{1}		Total		Ref.
Club	Season	League	Apps	Goals	Apps	Goals	Apps	Goals	Ref.
SpVgg Unterhaching	2012–13	3. Liga	1	0	0	0	1	0	
SpVgg Unterhaching	2013–14	3. Liga	18	1	—		18	1	
SpVgg Unterhaching	2014–15	3. Liga	29	3	—		29	3	
SpVgg Unterhaching	Total		48	4	0	0	48	4	—
SpVgg Unterhaching II	2014–15	Bayernliga Süd	3	1	—		3	1	
SC Freiburg II	2015–16	Regionalliga Südwest	3	1	—		3	1	
SC Freiburg II	2016–17	Oberliga Baden-Württemberg	10	3	—		10	3	
SC Freiburg II	Total		13	4	0	0	13	4	—
SC Freiburg	2015–16	2. Bundesliga	19	1	2	0	21	1	
1. FC Nürnberg	2016–17	2. Bundesliga	10	0	0	0	10	0	
1. FC Nürnberg	2017–18	2. Bundesliga	6	0	0	0	6	0	
1. FC Nürnberg	Total		16	0	0	0	16	0	—
Career total			99	10	2	0	101	10	—

- 1.Includes German Cup.
