= 2024 St. Louis City SC season =

St. Louis City 2024 soccer season

St. Louis City SC
2024 season
- Sporting director: Lutz Pfannenstiel
- Head coach: Bradley Carnell (until July 1); John Hackworth (interim, from July 1)
- Stadium: Energizer Park
- MLS: Conference: 12th Overall: 24th
- MLS Cup playoffs: Did not qualify
- CONCACAF Champions Cup: Round one
- Leagues Cup: Round of 16
- Top goalscorer: League: João Klauss; Eduard Löwen; Cedric Teuchert (5 each); All: Cedric Teuchert (7)
- Average home league attendance: 22,455
Home colors	Away colors

The 2024 season was the second season for St. Louis City SC. It was the club's second season in existence, their second in the top-tier of American soccer, and their second season in Major League Soccer.

2024 was the second year since 2023 that a top division club from Greater St. Louis played in the first tier of U.S. soccer, the last being the St. Louis Stars who played in the North American Soccer League from 1968 until 1977, and the old National Professional Soccer League in 1967.

Outside of MLS play, St. Louis City SC participated in the 2024 CONCACAF Champions Cup and the 2024 Leagues Cup.

== Summary ==
=== CONCACAF Champions Cup ===
St. Louis City SC opened the 2024 season in the 2024 CONCACAF Champions Cup playing against the Houston Dynamo. St. Louis earned its berth in the continental cup by winning the Western Conference of MLS. City SC was knocked out by Houston in the first round, tying the two-legged fixture 2-2 but losing the first tiebreaker to Houston based on away goals scored.

=== MLS Season ===
City SC began the MLS season slower than the previous year, taking 1 win and 4 draws among 6 matches in March, and closing out the month with 7 points and sitting 9th among 14 teams in the Western Conference.

As the 2024 season went on, City SC experienced several notable player absences, with midfielder Celieu Pompeau suffering a season-ending ankle injury in June, and hamstring injuries suffered by all three of midfielder Njabulo Blom, defender Joshua Yaro, and midfielder Eduard Löwen. Löwen missed further time for personal matters, announcing in May that his wife had been undergoing treatment for brain cancer.

The team struggled through the middle third of its schedule, with a 15-game stretch from May 15 to August 24 in which they only won a single game and took 8 of a possible 45 points, falling from 9th to 13th in the conference, and from a 5-point buffer ahead of the first non-playoff spot to sitting 10 points out of a playoff position. Following a 9-game stretch without a win, City SC fired head coach Bradley Carnell on July 1, replacing him for the remainder of the season with Technical Director and former St. Louis City 2 head coach John Hackworth.

City SC's performance improved slightly following the coaching change, with a win over San Jose in their first match under Hackworth, and a record of 5-6-3 in their final 14 games of the season; but it wasn't enough to return to the playoffs, with the team finishing the season 12th in the Western Conference and with 37 points.

== Club ==
=== Management ===
Position	Name
OWNERSHIP
Chairman & Majority Owner	(United States) Carloyn Kindle
Co-Owner	(United States) Jo Ann Taylor Kindle
Co-Owner	(United States) Jim Kavanaugh
FRONT OFFICE
President & General Manager	(Argentina) Diego Gigliani
Sporting Director	(Germany) Lutz Pfannenstiel
COACHING STAFF
Head Coach	(United States) John Hackworth (interim)
Director of Coaching	(United States) John Hackworth
Assistant Coach	(United States) Mitch Hildebrandt
Assistant Coach	(Germany) Rainer Kraft
Goalkeeper Coach	(Germany) Alex Langer
Director of Sports Performance	(United States) Jarryd Phillips
Head of Sports Science	(United States) Kelly Roderick

=== Roster ===
As of September 5, 2024

Note: Flags indicate national team as defined under FIFA eligibility rules; some limited exceptions apply. Players may hold more than one non-FIFA nationality.

No.	Pos.	Nation	Player
1	GK	SUI	Roman Bürki (captain)
2	DF	USA	Jake Nerwinski
3	MF	AUS	Jake Girdwood-Reich
4	DF	SWE	Joakim Nilsson
5	DF	USA	Henry Kessler
7	MF	CZE	Tomáš Ostrák
8	MF	USA	Chris Durkin
9	FW	BRA	João Klauss
10	MF	GER	Eduard Löwen
11	FW	USA	Simon Becher
12	MF	BRA	Célio Pompeu
14	DF	NOR	Tomas Totland
15	DF	GHA	Joshua Yaro
17	MF	GER	Marcel Hartel
19	MF	USA	Indiana Vassilev

No.	Pos.	Nation	Player
20	DF	USA	Akil Watts
21	MF	SWE	Rasmus Alm
22	DF	CAN	Kyle Hiebert
29	FW	ISL	Nökkvi Thórisson
31	GK	USA	Christian Olivares
33	MF	USA	Tyson Pearce
36	FW	GER	Cedric Teuchert
38	DF	GER	Jannes Horn
39	GK	GER	Ben Lundt
40	DF	USA	Michael Wentzel
41	MF	USA	John Klein
46	FW	USA	Caden Glover
85	MF	JPN	Hosei Kijima
99	DF	USA	Jayden Reid

== Competitions ==
=== Major League Soccer ===
==== Standings ====
===== Western Conference =====
MLS Western Conference table (2024)
Pos	Team	Pld	W	L	T	GF	GA	GD	Pts
10	Austin FC	34	11	14	9	39	48	−9	42
11	FC Dallas	34	11	15	8	54	56	−2	41
12	St. Louis City SC	34	8	13	13	50	63	−13	37
13	Sporting Kansas City	34	8	19	7	51	66	−15	31
14	San Jose Earthquakes	34	6	25	3	41	78	−37	21

Source: MLS
Rules for classification: 1) points; 2) total wins; 3) total goal differential; 4) total goals scored; 5) fewer disciplinary points; 6) away goal differential; 7) away goals scored; 8) home goals differential; 9) home goals scored; 10) coin toss (2 clubs tied) or drawing of lots (≥3 clubs tied)

===== Overall =====
Overall MLS standings table
Pos	Team	Pld	W	L	T	GF	GA	GD	Pts	Qualification
22	Toronto FC	34	11	19	4	40	61	−21	37	
23	Philadelphia Union	34	9	15	10	62	55	+7	37	Qualification for the U.S. Open Cup round of 32 (Note: As one of the U.S. teams who did not qualify for the 2025 CONCACAF Champions Cup or the 2025 Leagues Cup)
24	St. Louis City SC	34	8	13	13	50	63	−13	37	Qualification for the U.S. Open Cup round of 32
25	Nashville SC	34	9	16	9	38	54	−16	36	Qualification for the U.S. Open Cup round of 32
26	New England Revolution	34	9	21	4	37	74	−37	31	Qualification for the U.S. Open Cup round of 32

Source: MLS
Rules for classification: 1) points; 2) total wins; 3) total goal differential; 4) total goals scored; 5) fewer disciplinary points; 6) away goal differential; 7) away goals scored; 8) home goals differential; 9) home goals scored; 10) coin toss (2 clubs tied) or drawing of lots (≥3 clubs tied)

==== Match results ====
February 24 1	St. Louis City SC	1–1	Real Salt Lake	St. Louis, Missouri
7:30 p.m. CST	Pompeu (yellow card) 24'; Adeniran 78'	Report	Arango 74'	Stadium: CityPark; Attendance: 22,500; Referee: Lorenzo Hernandez

March 2 2	St. Louis City SC	2–0	New York City FC	St. Louis, Missouri
7:30 p.m. CST	Markanich 21'; Pompeu (yellow card) 35'; Vassilev (yellow card) 41'; Totland (yellow card) 45+3'; Adeniran 72'; Durkin (yellow card) 82'; Ostrák (yellow card) 90'	Report	Perea (yellow card) 28'; Sands (yellow card) 52' (red card) 83'; Ilenič (yellow card) 88'	Stadium: CityPark; Attendance: 22,423; Referee: Erick Lezama Pavon

March 9 3	Austin FC	2–2	St. Louis City SC	Austin, Texas
7:30 p.m. CST	Hedges 14'; Cascante 51', (yellow card) 77'	Report	Pompeu (yellow card) 31', (goal) 90+3'; Löwen 49' (pen.); Parker (yellow card) 61'; Totland (yellow card) 66'	Stadium: Q2 Stadium; Attendance: 20,738; Referee: Guilherme Cerretta

March 16 4	LA Galaxy	3–3	St. Louis City SC	Carson, California
9:30 p.m. CDT	Joveljić 3'; Cáceres (yellow card) 35', (red card) 90+9'; Paintsil (yellow card) 45+1', (goal) 51'; Puig (yellow card) 65'; Yoshida 90+5'	Report	Ostrák 27'; Jackson (yellow card) 51'; Nilsson 61', (yellow card) 70'; Adeniran (yellow card) 83'; McCarthy 89' (o.g.)	Stadium: Dignity Health Sports Park; Attendance: 25,174; Referee: Atahan Yaya

March 23 5	St. Louis City SC	2–2	D.C. United	St. Louis, Missouri
7:30 p.m. CDT	Yaro 19'; Nilsson (yellow card) 43'; Klauss 70' (pen.); Durkin (yellow card) 73'; Blom (yellow card) 90+12'; Alm (yellow card) 90+14'	Report	Ku-DiPietro 21', (yellow card) 82'; Hopkins (yellow card) 24'; Benteke 38'; Pirani (yellow card) 88'; Murrell (yellow card) 90+13'	Stadium: CityPark; Attendance: 22,423; Referee: Amin Hadzic

March 30 6	Real Salt Lake	3–1	St. Louis City SC	Sandy, Utah
8:30 p.m. CDT	Hidalgo (yellow card) 28'; Arango 70', 84', 90+1'	Report	Vassilev 3'; Markanich (yellow card) 30'; Parker (yellow card) 90+9'	Stadium: America First Field; Attendance: 19,357; Referee: Drew Fischer

April 6 7	St. Louis City SC	0–0	FC Dallas	St. Louis, Missouri
7:30 p.m. CDT	Parker (yellow card) 15'; Durkin (yellow card) 69'; Totland (yellow card) 82'	Report	Fraser (yellow card) 12'	Stadium: CityPark; Attendance: 22,423; Referee: Marcos DeOliveira II

April 14 8	St. Louis City SC	1–0	Austin FC	St. Louis, Missouri
3:35 p.m. CDT	Ostrák (yellow card) 3'; Durkin (yellow card) 37'; Klauss 57'	Report	Cascante (yellow card) 10'; Gallagher (yellow card) 67'	Stadium: CityPark; Attendance: 22,423; Referee: Ted Unkel

April 20 9	Sporting Kansas City	3–3	St. Louis City SC	Kansas City, Kansas
7:30 p.m. CDT	Pulido 17'; Sallói (yellow card) 45+7'; Radoja (yellow card) 47'; Bürki 65' (o.g.); Davis (yellow card) 71'; Thommy 77'	Report	Klauss 31'; Pompeu 45+3', (yellow card) 85'; Parker (yellow card) 63'; Totland 90+2'	Stadium: Children's Mercy Park; Attendance: 19,637; Referee: Allen Chapman

May 4 10	Houston Dynamo FC	0–0	St. Louis City SC	Houston, Texas
7:30 p.m. CDT	Schmitt (yellow card) 85'	Report	Ostrák (yellow card) 74'; Jackson (yellow card) 87'	Stadium: Shell Energy Stadium; Attendance: 22,039; Referee: Sergii Boiko

May 11 11	St. Louis City SC	3–1	Chicago Fire FC	St. Louis, Missouri
7:30 p.m. CDT	Alm 2', (yellow card) 45+1'; Klauss 56', 67'	Report	Herbers (yellow card) 22'; Cuypers 46'; Shaqiri (yellow card) 61'; Terán (yellow card) 90+1'	Stadium: CityPark; Attendance: 22,500; Referee: Pierre-Luc Lauziere

May 15 12	St. Louis City SC	0–2	Los Angeles FC	St. Louis, Missouri
7:30 p.m. CDT	Markanich (yellow card) 27' (yellow-red card) 75'; Pompeu (yellow card) 58'; Blom (yellow card) 82'; Jackson (yellow card) 84'; Vassilev (yellow card) 90+2'	Report	Tillman (yellow card) 45+6'; Bouanga 59', 90+5'; Dueñas (yellow card) 86'	Stadium: CityPark; Attendance: 22,423; Referee: Joe Dickerson

May 18 13	FC Cincinnati	3–1	St. Louis City SC	Cincinnati, Ohio
6:30 p.m. CDT	Acosta 26'; Murphy (yellow card) 36'; Kubo 49'; Santos 80'	Report	Kijima (yellow card) 35'; Adeniran (yellow card) 44'; Miazga 54' (o.g.)	Stadium: TQL Stadium; Attendance: 25,513; Referee: Timothy Ford

May 25 14	St. Louis City SC	1–2	Seattle Sounders FC	St. Louis, Missouri
7:30 p.m. CDT	Vassilev (yellow card) 35'; Blom (yellow card) 39'; Durkin (yellow card) 48'; Totland 82'	Report	Hiebert 66' (o.g.); Morris 69'; Kossa-Rienzi (yellow card) 80'; Yeimar (yellow card) 85'	Stadium: CityPark; Attendance: 22,500; Referee: Lukasz Szpala

June 1 15	Inter Miami CF	3–3	St. Louis City SC	Fort Lauderdale, Florida
6:30 p.m. CDT	Messi 25'; Suárez 45+2'; Alba 85'; Busquets (yellow card) 90'	Report	Durkin 15'; Vassilev 41'; Parker (yellow card) 61'; Suárez 68' (o.g.)	Stadium: Chase Stadium; Attendance: 20,793; Referee: Allen Chapman

June 8 16	St. Louis City SC	0–0	Portland Timbers	St. Louis, Missouri
7:30 p.m. CDT	Markanich (yellow card) 45+2'; Nilsson (yellow card) 45+4'; Kijima (yellow card) 51'; Pompeu (yellow card) 67'; Durkin (yellow card) 81'; Totland (yellow card) 82'	Report	Župarić (yellow card) 53'; Mora (yellow card) 83'	Stadium: CityPark; Attendance: 22,500; Referee: Ismir Pekmic

June 15 17	FC Dallas	2–0	St. Louis City SC	Frisco, Texas
7:30 p.m. CDT	Ferreira 28'; Illarramendi (yellow card) 45+11'; Ibeagha (yellow card) 65'; Tafari 81'	Report	Nilsson (yellow card) 26'; Parker (yellow card) 34'; Löwen (yellow card) 68'; Þórisson (yellow card) 75'	Stadium: Toyota Stadium; Attendance: 19,096; Referee: Jon Freemon

June 19 18	St. Louis City SC	0–3	Colorado Rapids	St. Louis, Missouri
7:30 p.m. CDT	Klauss (yellow card) 15'; Yaro (yellow card) 64'; Kijima (yellow card) 81'; Watts (yellow card) 90+5'	Report	Mihailovic 9', 60', 90+6', (yellow card) 57'; Ronan (yellow card) 73'	Stadium: CityPark; Attendance: 22,500; Referee: Guido Gonzales, Jr.

June 22 19	St. Louis City SC	1–1	Atlanta United FC	St. Louis, Missouri
7:30 p.m. CDT	Vassilev 50', (yellow card) 85'; Reid (yellow card) 58'	Report	Gregersen (yellow card) 46'; Ríos 71'	Stadium: CityPark; Referee: Filip Dujic

June 29 20	Vancouver Whitecaps FC	4–3	St. Louis City SC	Vancouver, British Columbia
9:30 p.m. CDT	Brown (yellow card) 12'; White 37', 54', 61'; Picault 90'	Report	Blo 7'; Löwen 12'; Markanich (yellow card) 26'; Nerwinski (yellow card) 49'; Þórisson 90+3'	Stadium: BC Place; Attendance: 24,662; Referee: Mark Allatin

July 3 21	St. Louis City SC	2–0	San Jose Earthquakes	St. Louis, Missouri
7:30 p.m. CDT	Löwen 28'; Kijima 41'; Reid (yellow card) 56'; Vassilev (yellow card) 61'	Report	López (yellow card) 66'; Vítor Costa (yellow card) 72'	Stadium: CityPark; Attendance: 22,500; Referee: Malik Badawi

July 7 22	Colorado Rapids	4–1	St. Louis City SC	Commerce City, Colorado
8:30 p.m. CDT	Cabral 6'; Bassett 35'; Lewis 81'; Yapi 90'	Report	Klein III 12'; Durkin (yellow card) 75'	Stadium: Dick's Sporting Goods Park; Attendance: 16,331; Referee: Drew Fischer

July 13 23	St. Louis City SC	1–4	Vancouver Whitecaps FC	St. Louis, Missouri
7:30 p.m. CDT	Blom (yellow card) 19'; Þórisson 28'; Reid (yellow card) 53'; Durkin (yellow card) 71'	Report	White 9', 44'; Berhalter (yellow card) 45+7'; Raposo 63'; Cubas (yellow card) 88'; Picault 90+2'; Johnson (yellow card) 90+6'	Stadium: CityPark; Attendance: 22,500; Referee: Pierre-Luc Lauziere

July 17 24	Seattle Sounders FC	2–0	St. Louis City SC	Seattle, Washington
9:30 p.m. CDT	Parker 27' (o.g.); Bell 49'; Rothrock (yellow card) 90+2'	Report	Durkin (yellow card) 4'; Totland (yellow card) 38'	Stadium: Lumen Field; Attendance: 30,032; Referee: Alexis Da Silva

July 20 25	Sporting Kansas City	1–1	St. Louis City SC	Kansas City, Kansas
7:30 p.m. CDT	Agada 73'; Leibold (yellow card) 84'; Shelton (yellow card) 89'	Report	Thórisson (yellow card) 34', (goal) 42'; Watts (yellow card) 45+1'; Kijima (yellow card) 90+4'	Stadium: Children's Mercy Park; Attendance: 19,876; Referee: Rubiel Vazquez

August 24 26	Portland Timbers	4–4	St. Louis City SC	Portland, Oregon
9:30 p.m. CDT	Araujo (yellow card) 34'; Rodríguez 39', (yellow card) 73'; Mora 57', 64', (red card) 90+3'; Evander (yellow card) 65', (goal) 90+9'; Williamson (yellow card) 76'	Report	Becher 10'; Löwen 36' (pen.); Teuchert 45+2'; Thórisson (yellow card) 50', (goal) 58'; Hartel (yellow card) 60'; Horn (yellow card) 89'	Stadium: Providence Park; Attendance: 22,583; Referee: Ramy Touchan

September 1 27	St. Louis City SC	2–1	LA Galaxy	St. Louis, Missouri
2:30 p.m. CDT	Teuchert 9', (yellow card) 38'; Horn (yellow card) 53'; Hartel 68'; Durkin (yellow card) 74'; Klauss (yellow card) 81'	Report	Pec 46'; Paintsil (yellow card) 90+3'	Stadium: CityPark; Attendance: 22,423; Referee: Joe Dickerson

September 7 28	New England Revolution	2–2	St. Louis City SC	Foxborough, Massachusetts
6:30 p.m. CDT	Vrioni (yellow card) 16'; Langoni 28'; C. Gil 40'	Report	Horn (yellow card) 21'; Kessler 23', (yellow card) 51'; Löwen (yellow card) 56'; Hiebert (yellow card) 59'; Becher 73'	Stadium: Gillette Stadium; Attendance: 30,512; Referee: Timothy Ford
Note: Match was originally scheduled for June 21

September 14 29	St. Louis City SC	1–3	Minnesota United FC	St. Louis, Missouri
7:30 p.m. CDT	Teuchert 4'; Löwen (yellow card) 90+1'	Report	Boxall (yellow card) 20'; Hlongwane 24'; Reid 52' (o.g.); Yeboah 62' (pen.); Jeong Sang-bin (yellow card) 90+4'	Stadium: CityPark; Attendance: 22,423; Referee: Marcos DeOliveira II

September 21 30	San Jose Earthquakes	1–2	St. Louis City SC	San Jose, California
9:30 p.m. CDT	Ebobisse 40'	Report	Teuchert 4'; Hartel 13' (pen.), (yellow card) 39'	Stadium: PayPal Park; Attendance: 15,112; Referee: Ricardo Montero

September 28 31	St. Louis City SC	3–1	Sporting Kansas City	St. Louis, Missouri
7:30 p.m. CDT	Teuchert 33', (yellow card) 80'; Klauss (yellow card) 39'; Alm 54'; Löwen 75'; Horn (yellow card) 86'	Report	Rosero (yellow card) 45'; Pulskamp (yellow card) 45'; Voloder (yellow card) 45+5'; Afrifa 63'	Stadium: CityPark; Attendance: 22,423; Referee: Guido Gonzales, Jr.

October 2 32	Los Angeles FC	1–0	St. Louis City SC	Los Angeles, California
9:30 p.m. CDT	Bogusz (yellow card) 8'; Chanot (yellow card) 12'; Bouanga 45+1'	Report	Hartel (yellow card) 7'; Becher (yellow card) 90+5'	Stadium: BMO Stadium; Attendance: 22,064; Referee: Victor Rivas

October 5 33	St. Louis City SC	3–0	Houston Dynamo FC	St. Louis, Missouri
7:30 p.m. CDT	Becher 14', 47'; Totland (yellow card) 39'; Nilsson (yellow card) 85'; Nerwinski 90+2'	Report	Escobar (yellow card) 19' (yellow-red card) 79'	Stadium: CityPark; Attendance: 22,423; Referee: Tori Penso

October 19 34	Minnesota United FC	4–1	St. Louis City SC	Saint Paul, Minnesota
8:00 p.m. CDT	Lod 21'; Pereyra (yellow card) 59'; Yeboah (yellow card) 66'; Jeong Sang-bin 72', 83'; Kessler 78' (o.g.)	Report	Alm (yellow card) 74'; Hartel 75'	Stadium: Allianz Field; Attendance: 19,881; Referee: Lukasz Szpala

=== U.S. Open Cup ===
St. Louis City SC was not sent to the tournament, and neither was their MLS Next Pro team St. Louis City 2 following the deal reached on March 1, 2024, due to their participation in the 2024 CONCACAF Champions Cup.

=== CONCACAF Champions Cup ===
February 20 Round one	St. Louis City SC (United States)	2–1	(United States) Houston Dynamo FC	St. Louis, Missouri
7:00 p.m. CST	Parker 61'; Kijima 90+1'	Report	Clark (yellow card) 21'; Kowalczyk 72'; Dorsey (yellow card) 89'; Segal (yellow card) 90'	Stadium: CityPark; Attendance: 20,900; Referee: Adonai Escobedo

February 27 Round one	Houston Dynamo FC	1–0 (2–2 agg.)	St. Louis City SC	Houston, Texas
9:30 p.m. CST	Sviatchenko 60'; Escobar (yellow card) 90+3'	Report	Nerwinski (yellow card) 42'; Wentzel (yellow card) 90'	Stadium: Shell Energy Stadium; Attendance: 5,007; Referee: Marco Ortíz
Note: 2–2 on aggregate. Houston Dynamo FC won on away goals.

=== Leagues Cup ===
==== Group stage (West 3) ====
Pos	Team	Pld	W	PW	PL	L	GF	GA	GD	Pts	Qualification	JUA	STL	DAL
1	(Mexican Football Federation) Juárez	2	1	1	0	0	3	1	+2	5	Advance to knockout stage	—	—	—
2	(United States Soccer Federation) St. Louis City SC	2	1	0	1	0	3	2	+1	4	Advance to knockout stage	1–1	—	2–1
3	(United States Soccer Federation) FC Dallas	2	0	0	0	2	1	4	−3	0		0–1	—	—

Source: Leagues Cup
Rules for classification: Tiebreakers

July 27 Group stage	St. Louis City SC (United States)	2–1	(United States) FC Dallas	St. Louis, Missouri
8:00 p.m. CDT	Teuchert 27'; Hartel 49' (pen.); Reid (yellow card) 54'; Hiebert (yellow card) 65'; Parker (yellow card) 66'	Report	Junqua 18'; Ntsabeleng (yellow card) 21'; Ibeagha (yellow card) 64'	Stadium: CityPark; Attendance: 17,584; Referee: Katja Koroleva

August 4 Group stage	St. Louis City SC (United States)	1–1 (1–4 p)	(Mexico) Juárez	St. Louis, Missouri
21:00 (20:00 UTC−5)	Becher 58'	Report	Villalpando 62', (yellow card) 79'	Stadium: CityPark; Attendance: 16,256; Referee: Jesús López (Mexico)
	Penalties
	Teuchert (penalty missed); Þórisson (penalty scored); Hartel (penalty missed)		(penalty scored) Hurtado; (penalty scored) Calvo; (penalty scored) Zaldívar; (penalty scored) Ortega

==== Knockout stage ====
August 9 Round of 32	St. Louis City SC (United States)	3–1	(United States) Portland Timbers	St. Louis, Missouri
20:30 ET	Teuchert 51'; Hartel 83'; Becher 88'	Report	Bravo 54'	Stadium: CityPark; Attendance: 10,833; Referee: Pierre-Luc Lauzière (Canada)

August 13 Round of 16	América (Mexico)	4–2	(United States) St. Louis City SC	Carson, California
22:30 (19:30 UTC−7)	Rodríguez 18', 86' (pen.); Valdés (yellow card) 45+3' (goal) 79'; Malagón (yellow card) 90+4'; Aguirre 90+8'	Report	Vassilev 49'; Löwen 55' (pen.)	Stadium: Dignity Health Sports Park; Attendance: 11,553; Referee: Marco Ortiz

== Statistics ==
=== Goalscorers ===
Rank	Player	MLS	CONCACAF	Leagues Cup	Total
1	(Germany) Cedric Teuchert	5	0	2	7
2	(United States) Simon Becher	4	0	2	6
2	(Germany) Eduard Löwen	5	0	1	6
5	(Germany) Marcel Hartel	3	0	2	5
5	(Brazil) João Klauss	5	0	0	5
6	(Iceland) Nökkvi Thórisson	4	0	0	4
6	(United States) Indiana Vassilev	3	0	1	4
8	(Brazil) Célio Pompeu	3	0	0	3
9	(Sweden) Rasmus Alm	2	0	0	2
9	(United States) Samuel Adeniran	2	0	0	2
9	(Japan) Hosei Kijima	1	1	0	2
9	(Norway) Tomas Totland	2	0	0	2
13	(South Africa) Njabulo Blom	1	0	0	1
13	(United States) Chris Durkin	1	0	0	1
13	(United States) Henry Kessler	1	0	0	1
13	(United States) John Klein	1	0	0	1
13	(United States) Jake Nerwinski	1	0	0	1
13	(Sweden) Joakim Nilsson	1	0	0	1
13	(Czech Republic) Tomáš Ostrák	1	0	0	1
13	(United States) Tim Parker	0	1	0	1
13	(Ghana) Joshua Yaro	1	0	0	1
Own goals		3	0	0	3
Total		50	2	8	60

== Awards ==
=== MLS Goal of the Matchday ===
The MLS Goal of the Matchday is selected each Matchday of the regular season through fan voting in a process conducted by MLS Communications.

Matchday	Player	Opponent	Score	Result	Vote %
5	(Sweden) Joakim Nilsson	@ LA Galaxy	2-2	D 3-3	43%
10	(Brazil) Célio Pompeu	@ Sporting Kansas City	2-1	D 3-3	41%
18	(United States) Chris Durkin	@ Inter Miami	1-0	D 3-3	48%
31	(United States) Simon Becher	@ New England Revolution	2-2	D 2-2	49.2%

=== MLS Team of the Matchday ===
Matchday	Selection(s)		Opponent
3
3	XI	(Brazil) Célio Pompeu	New York City FC
3	BENCH	(Sweden) Joakim Nilsson	New York City FC
4	BENCH	(Brazil) Célio Pompeu	@ Austin FC
5	XI	(Switzerland) Roman Bürki	@ LA Galaxy
6	BENCH	(Ghana) Joshua Yaro	DC United
9	BENCH	(Brazil) Joao Klauss	Austin FC
10	XI	(Norway) Tomas Totland	@ Sporting Kansas City
10	BENCH	(Brazil) Joao Klauss	@ Sporting Kansas City
12	XI	(Switzerland) Roman Bürki	@ Houston Dynamo
13	XI	(Brazil) Joao Klauss	Chicago Fire FC
24	BENCH	(United States) Indiana Vassilev	San Jose Earthquakes
28	XI	(Switzerland) Roman Bürki	@ Sporting Kansas City
29	XI	(Germany) Marcel Hartel	@ Portland Timbers
30	BENCH	(Germany) Marcel Hartel	LA Galaxy
31	BENCH	(Germany) Marcel Hartel (United States) Simon Becher	@ New England Revolution
35	XI	(Germany) Cedric Teuchert	Sporting Kansas City
37	XI	(Germany) Marcel Hartel (United States) Simon Becher	Houston Dynamo

=== MLS All-Star Selections ===
The 2024 MLS All-Star Game was held on July 24, 2024, at Lower.com Field in Columbus, Ohio against the Liga MX All-Stars.

No.	Position	Name	All-Star Selection	Start/Bench	Minutes
1	GK	(Switzerland) Roman Bürki	2nd	Start	46

== Transfers ==
=== In ===
No.	Pos.	Player	Transferred from	Type	Date	Ref.
8	MF	(United States) Chris Durkin	(United States) D.C. United	Traded+$300,000 GAM	December 12, 2023	
14	DF	(Norway) Tomas Totland	(Sweden) BK Häcken	Undisclosed	December 21, 2023	
33	MF	(United States) Tyson Pearce	(United States) St. Louis City Academy	Homegrown player	January 1, 2024	
44	DF	(Denmark) Nikolas Dyhr	(Denmark) FC Midtjylland	Undisclosed	January 8, 2024	
85	MF	(Japan) Hosei Kijima	(United States) Wake Forest University	MLS SuperDraft	February 20, 2024	
36	FW	(Germany) Cedric Teuchert	(Germany) Hannover 96	Free	May 28, 2024	
3	MF	(Australia) Jake Girdwood-Reich	(Australia) Sydney FC	Undisclosed	June 3, 2024	
41	MF	(United States) John Klein	(United States) St. Louis City 2	Homegrown player	June 22, 2024	
17	MF	(Germany) Marcel Hartel	(Germany) FC St. Pauli	Free	July 2, 2024	
40	DF	(United States) Michael Wentzel	(United States) St. Louis City 2	Homegrown player	July 3, 2024	
99	DF	(United States) Jayden Reid	(United States) St. Louis City 2	Homegrown player	July 7, 2024	
11	FW	(United States) Simon Becher	(Denmark) AC Horsens	Loan	July 23, 2024	
38	DF	(Germany) Jannes Horn	(Germany) 1. FC Nürnberg	Loan	August 2, 2024	
5	DF	(United States) Henry Kessler	(United States) New England Revolution	Traded	August 3, 2024	

=== Out ===
No.	Pos.	Player	Transferred to	Type	Date	Ref.
23	DF	(United States) Jon Bell	(United States) Seattle Sounders FC	Out of contract	November 29, 2023	
31	GK	(United States) Michael Creek	(United States) FC Tulsa	Option declined	November 29, 2023	
14	DF	(United States) John Nelson	(United States) LA Galaxy	Out of contract	November 29, 2023	
18	DF	(United States) Owen O'Malley	(United States) Tacoma Defiance	Walved	November 29, 2023	
44	MF	(Germany) Max Schneider	(United States) Indy Eleven	Option declined	November 29, 2023	
8	MF	(United States) Jared Stroud	(United States) D.C. United	Traded	December 12, 2023	
24	DF	(United States) Lucas Bartlett	(United States) D.C. United	Traded	December 12, 2023	
28	MF	(United States) Miguel Perez	(United States) Birmingham Legion FC	Loan	January 22, 2024	
11	FW	(United States) Nicholas Gioacchini	(Italy) Como 1907	Undisclosed	January 24, 2024	
25	MF	(United States) Aziel Jackson	(United States) Columbus Crew	$650,000 GAM	June 18, 2024	
44	DF	(Denmark) Nikolas Dyhr	(Denmark) Randers	Undisclosed	June 18, 2024	
16	FW	(United States) Samuel Adeniran	(United States) Philadelphia Union	$150,000 GAM	July 18, 2024	
26	DF	(United States) Tim Parker	(United States) New England Revolution	Traded+$600,000 GAM	August 3, 2024	
13	DF	(United States) Anthony Markanich	(United States) Minnesota United	$50,000 GAM	August 15, 2024	
6	MF	(South Africa) Njabulo Blom	(South Africa) Kaizer Chiefs	Loan	September 3, 2024	
