= Sporting Kansas City–St. Louis City SC rivalry =

Soccer rivalry between St. Louis City SC and Sporting Kansas City

- Other names: Heartland derby, I-70 derby, Soccer Capital derby
- Location: Missouri; Midwestern United States
- Teams: Sporting Kansas City; St. Louis City SC
- First meeting: May 20, 2023; MLS regular season STL 4–0 SKC
- Latest meeting: August 19, 2026; MLS regular season SKC 1–1 STL

Statistics
- Total meetings: 12
- Most wins: Both clubs (4 each)
- Top scorer: Dejan Joveljić (4 goals)
- Largest victory: STL 4–0 SKC; MLS regular season (May 20, 2023)
- Location of the two teams' stadiums in Kansas and Missouri

The Sporting Kansas City–St. Louis City SC rivalry, is a soccer rivalry between the two Major League Soccer (MLS) clubs Sporting Kansas City and St. Louis City SC.

== Background ==
The cities of St. Louis and Kansas City have a longstanding rivalry, being the two major metropolitan areas in the state of Missouri. St. Louis's addition to MLS for the 2023 season created a new outlet for the inter-city rivalry.

Prior to the clubs' first meeting, Sporting Kansas City accused the Soccer Capitol Podcast, a St. Louis fan podcast, of infringing on the trademark "The Soccer Capital of America," which was registered to Kansas Training Partners LLC, an affiliate company of Sporting Kansas City.

St. Louis City won the first meeting at CityPark in May 2023, but Sporting KC won the second meeting, which took place at Children's Mercy Park the following September. The two teams played in their first postseason matchup in the 2023 MLS Cup playoffs, with Sporting Kansas City (the #8 seed) upsetting the #1 seeded St. Louis in a best-of-three series.

Supporters, players, and staff of St. Louis City SC have referenced the fact that Sporting Kansas City, despite previously claiming to represent the state of Missouri in MLS, plays in Kansas City, Kansas, often referring to the club simply as "kansas".

Names for the rivalry include:

- Soccer Capital Derby - A reference to the trademark dispute between Sporting Kansas City and the Soccer Capital Podcast, as well as both franchise's claim to their home city being "The Soccer Capital of America".
- I-70 Derby - A reference to the I-70 Series of Major League Baseball, and the Interstate highway connecting the two cities.
- The Darbecue - A reference to the barbecue cultures of both St. Louis and Kansas City.
- Heartland Derby
- Cease & Desist Derby - Another reference to the trademark dispute.

== Results ==
=== Summary ===
As of August 19, 2026

Competition	Matches	SKC wins	Draws	STL wins	SKC goals	STL goals
MLS regular season	10	2	4	4	15	22
MLS Cup playoffs	2	2	0	0	6	2
Total	12	4	4	4	21	24

=== Matches ===
Season	Date	Competition	Stadium	Home team	Result	Away team	Attendance	Series	Ref
2023	May 20	MLS	CityPark	St. Louis City SC	4–0	Sporting Kansas City	22,423	STL 1–0–0	
2023	September 2	MLS	Children's Mercy Park	Sporting Kansas City	2–1	St. Louis City SC	21,650	Tied 1–1–0	
2023	September 30	MLS	CityPark	St. Louis City SC	4–1	Sporting Kansas City	22,423	STL 2–1–0	
2023	October 30	MLS Cup playoffs	CityPark	St. Louis City SC	4–1	Sporting Kansas City	22,423	Tied 2–2–0	
2023	November 5	MLS Cup playoffs	Children's Mercy Park	Sporting Kansas City	2–1	St. Louis City SC	21,650	SKC 3–2–0	
2024	April 20	MLS	Children's Mercy Park	Sporting Kansas City	3–3	St. Louis City SC	21,650	SKC 3–2–1	
2024	July 20	MLS	Children's Mercy Park	Sporting Kansas City	1–1	St. Louis City SC	19,876	SKC 3–2–2	
2024	September 28	MLS	CityPark	St. Louis City SC	3–1	Sporting Kansas City	22,423	Tied 3–3–2	
2025	April 5	MLS	Children's Mercy Park	Sporting Kansas City	2–0	St. Louis City SC	18,116	SKC 4–3–2	
2025	May 14	MLS	Energizer Park	St. Louis City SC	2–2	Sporting Kansas City	22,423	SKC 4–3–3	
2026	July 16	MLS	Energizer Park	St. Louis City SC	3–2	Sporting Kansas City	22,423	Tied 4–4–3	
2026	August 19	MLS	Sporting Park	Sporting Kansas City	1–1	St. Louis City SC	15,355	Tied 4–4–4	
2027	April 3	MLS	Sporting Park	Sporting Kansas City		St. Louis City SC			

=== Western Conference standings finishes ===
As of November 9, 2026

Teams above red line qualified for the MLS Cup playoffs.
SKC STL

P.	2023	2024	2025	2026
1	1			
2				
3				3
4				
5				
6				
7				
8	8			
9				
10				
11				
12		12		
13		13	13	
14				
15			15	15

• Total: STL with 4 higher finishes, SKC with 0.

== Top goalscorers ==
As of October 12, 2026

Rank	Nation	Player	Team	Goals
1	SRB	Dejan Joveljić	Sporting Kansas City	4
1	GER	Eduard Löwen	St. Louis City SC	4
3	BRA	João Klauss	St. Louis City SC	3
3	BRA	Célio Pompeu	St. Louis City SC	3
3	MEX	Alan Pulido	Sporting Kansas City	3
6	USA	Samuel Adeniran	St. Louis City SC	2
6	NGA	William Agada	Sporting Kansas City	2
6	BEL	Logan Ndenbe	Sporting Kansas City	2
6	HUN	Dániel Sallói	Sporting Kansas City	2
6	GER	Cedric Teuchert	St. Louis City SC	2
6	USA	Indiana Vassilev	St. Louis City SC	2
