= 2017–18 1. FC Nürnberg season =

1. FC Nürnberg
2017–18 season
- Manager: Michael Köllner
- Stadium: Max-Morlock-Stadion
- 2. Bundesliga: 2nd (promoted to Bundesliga)
- DFB-Pokal: 3rd Round
- Top goalscorer: League: Hanno Behrens (14); All: Hanno Behrens (15)
- Highest home attendance: 50,000 vs Düsseldorf
- Lowest home attendance: 21,872 vs Bochum
- Average home league attendance: 30,522
Home colours	Away colours	Third colours

The 2017–18 1. FC Nürnberg season is the 118th season in the club's football history.

== Review and events ==
In 2017–18 the club plays in the 2. Bundesliga.

The club also took part in the 2017–18 edition of the DFB-Pokal, the German Cup.

== Friendly matches ==
23 June 2017	SC 04 Schwabach	0–5	1. FC Nürnberg	Schwabach
19:00 CEST (UTC+02)				Stadium: Stadion an der Nördlinger Straße; Attendance: 4,000; Referee: Patrick Hanslbauer

27 June 2017	VfB Eichstätt	1–2	1. FC Nürnberg	Eichstätt
18:30 CEST (UTC+02)				Stadium: Liqui-Moly-Stadion; Attendance: 3,800; Referee: Steffen Grimmeißen

1 July 2017	Bohemians 1905	0–4	1. FC Nürnberg	Weiden
18:00 CEST (UTC+02)				Stadium: Sparda Bank-Stadion; Attendance: 1,230; Referee: Christian Dietz

4 July 2017	Eintracht Bamberg	0–9	1. FC Nürnberg	Bamberg
18:30 CEST (UTC+02)				Stadium: Fuchs-Park-Stadion; Attendance: 2,478; Referee: Markus Pflaum

11 July 2017	VfR Garching	2–5	1. FC Nürnberg	Natz-Schabs, Italy
18:00 CEST (UTC+02)				Stadium: Laugen-Arena; Attendance: 150

15 July 2017	Inter Milano	1–2	1. FC Nürnberg	Reischach, Italy
17:00 CEST (UTC+02)				Stadium: Sportpark Reischach; Attendance: 4,000; Referee: Matt Cecchin

23 July 2017	1. FC Nürnberg	2–1	Borussia Mönchengladbach	Nuremberg
14:30 CEST (UTC+02)	Löwen 11'; Behrens 28'		Zakaria 2'	Stadium: Max-Morlock-Stadion; Attendance: 10,329; Referee: Felix Brych

30 August 2017	TSV Windsbach	1–13	1. FC Nürnberg	Windsbach
18:00 CEST (UTC+02)				Attendance: 2,000

1 September 2017	1. FC Nürnberg	1–1	FK Dukla Prague	Raigering
18:00 CEST (UTC+02)				Stadium: Pandurenpark; Attendance: 1,000; Referee: Florian Kornblum

6 October 2017	TSV Meckenhausen	1–6	1. FC Nürnberg	Meckenhausen
18:00 CEST (UTC+02)				Attendance: 1,200

10 October 2017	FC Schweinfurt 05	0–7	1. FC Nürnberg	Schweinfurt
19:00 CEST (UTC+02)				Stadium: Willy-Sachs-Stadion; Attendance: 597; Referee: Markus Pflaum

11 November 2017	VfR Garching	0–2	1. FC Nürnberg	Garching
14:00 CET (UTC+01)				Stadium: Stadion am See; Attendance: 160; Referee: Michael Bacher

9 January 2018	KAA Gent (Belgium)	1–0	1. FC Nürnberg	Oliva Nova, Spain
15:30 CET (UTC+01)				Attendance: 200

13 January 2018	Heart of Midlothian	0–5	1. FC Nürnberg	Oliva Nova, Spain
15:30 CET (UTC+01)				Attendance: 120

17 January 2018	1. FC Nürnberg	2–1	FK Dukla Prague	Nuremberg
14:00 CET (UTC+01)				Stadium: Max-Morlock-Platz; Attendance: 350

23 March 2018	SV Ried	1–2	1. FC Nürnberg	Kelheim
18:00 CET (UTC+01)				Stadium: Städtisches Stadion; Attendance: 300

== Competitions ==
Win Draw Loss

=== 2. Bundesliga ===
==== League table ====
Pos	Team	Pld	W	D	L	GF	GA	GD	Pts	Promotion, qualification or relegation
1	Fortuna Düsseldorf (C, P)	34	19	6	9	57	44	+13	63	Promotion to Bundesliga
2	1. FC Nürnberg (P)	34	17	9	8	61	39	+22	60	Promotion to Bundesliga
3	Holstein Kiel	34	14	14	6	71	44	+27	56	Qualification for promotion play-offs
4	Arminia Bielefeld	34	12	12	10	51	47	+4	48	
5	Jahn Regensburg	34	14	6	14	53	53	0	48	

Source: DFB
Rules for classification: 1) Points; 2) Goal difference; 3) Goals scored
(C) Champions; (P) Promoted

==== Matches ====
30 July 2017 1	1. FC Nürnberg	3–0	1. FC Kaiserslautern	Nürnberg
13:30 CEST (UTC+02)	Behrens 13'; Müller 25' (o.g.); Möhwald 54'	Report		Stadium: Max-Morlock-Stadion; Attendance: 30,569; Referee: Markus Schmidt; Man of the Match: Kerk

6 August 2017 2	SSV Jahn Regensburg	0–1	1. FC Nürnberg	Regensburg
13:30 CEST (UTC+02)		Report	Möhwald 78'	Stadium: Continental Arena; Attendance: 15,000 (sell-out); Referee: Harm Osmers; Man of the Match: Möhwald

20 August 2017 3	1. FC Nürnberg	2–2	1. FC Union Berlin	Nürnberg
13:30 CEST (UTC+02)	Teuchert 55'; Behrens 90'	Report	Hedlund 47'; Polter 66'	Stadium: Max-Morlock-Stadion; Attendance: 29,813; Referee: Robert Schröder; Man of the Match: Polter

26 August 2017 4	FC Erzgebirge Aue	3–1	1. FC Nürnberg	Aue
13:00 CEST (UTC+02)	Wydra 60'; Nazarov 73'; Köpke 77'	Report	Möhwald 87'	Stadium: Erzgebirgsstadion; Attendance: 9,000 (sell-out); Referee: Lasse Koslowski; Man of the Match: Wydra

11 September 2017 5	1. FC Nürnberg	0–1	FC St. Pauli	Nürnberg
20:30 CEST (UTC+02)		Report	Sobota 63'	Stadium: Max-Morlock-Stadion; Attendance: 27,375; Referee: Daniel Schlager; Man of the Match: Sobota

16 September 2017 6	MSV Duisburg	1–6	1. FC Nürnberg	Duisburg
13:00 CEST (UTC+02)	Stoppelkamp 82' (pen.)	Report	Ishak 10', 25', 74'; Löwen 51', 76'; Teuchert 89'	Stadium: MSV-Arena; Attendance: 17,788; Referee: Timo Gerach; Man of the Match: Ishak

21 September 2017 7	1. FC Nürnberg	3–1	VfL Bochum	Nürnberg
20:30 CEST (UTC+02)	Löwen 28'; Behrens 52'; Ishak 86'	Report	Diamantakos 13' (pen.)	Stadium: Max-Morlock-Stadion; Attendance: 21,872; Referee: Florian Heft; Man of the Match: Löwen

24 September 2017 8	SpVgg Greuther Fürth	1–3	1. FC Nürnberg	Fürth
13:30 CEST (UTC+02)	Gjasula 79' (pen.)	Report	Ishak 9'; Teuchert 58'; Behrens 90+3'	Stadium: Sportpark Ronhof; Attendance: 13,550; Referee: Felix Zwayer; Man of the Match: Teuchert

30 September 2017 9	1. FC Nürnberg	1–2	Arminia Bielefeld	Nürnberg
13:00 CEST (UTC+02)	Ishak 79'	Report	Sporar 61'; Kerschbaumer 86'	Stadium: Max-Morlock-Stadion; Attendance: 26,186; Referee: Matthias Jöllenbeck; Man of the Match: Ortega

16 October 2017 10	SV Darmstadt 98	3–4	1. FC Nürnberg	Darmstadt
20:30 CEST (UTC+02)	Y. Stark 6'; Platte 72'; Löwen 87' (ogg.)	Report	Teuchert 23', 58'; Ishak 51'; Leibold 74'	Stadium: Merck-Stadion am Böllenfalltor; Attendance: 17,100; Referee: Bibiana Steinhaus; Man of the Match: Teuchert

22 October 2017 11	1. FC Nürnberg	2–1	Dynamo Dresden	Nürnberg
13:30 CEST (UTC+02)	Ishak 7'; Teuchert 82'	Report	Mlapa 69' (pen.)	Stadium: Max-Morlock-Stadion; Attendance: 33,601; Referee: Robert Kempter; Man of the Match: Teuchert

29 October 2017 12	1. FC Heidenheim	1–0	1. FC Nürnberg	Heidenheim
13:30 CET (UTC+01)	Glatzel 67'	Report		Stadium: Voith-Arena; Attendance: 12,600; Referee: Robert Schröder; Man of the Match: Wittek

6 November 2017 13	1. FC Nürnberg	1–2	FC Ingolstadt 04	Nürnberg
20:30 CET (UTC+01)	Möhwald 36'	Report	Kutschke 14'; Lezcano 81' (pen.)	Stadium: Max-Morlock-Stadion; Attendance: 24,191; Referee: Felix Zwayer; Man of the Match: Nyland

18 November 2017 14	1. FC Nürnberg	2–2	Holstein Kiel	Nürnberg
13:00 CET (UTC+01)	Behrens 54'; Ishak 62'	Report	Seydel 70'; Mühling 88'	Stadium: Max-Morlock-Stadion; Attendance: 27,274; Referee: Daniel Siebert; Man of the Match: Ishak

25 November 2017 15	Eintracht Braunschweig	2–3	1. FC Nürnberg	Braunschweig
13:00 CET (UTC+01)	Khelifi 38'; Abdullahi 64'	Report	Behrens 36'; Ishak 68', 83'	Stadium: Eintracht-Stadion; Attendance: 21,605; Referee: Sören Storks; Man of the Match: Ishak

2 December 2017 16	1. FC Nürnberg	1–0	SV Sandhausen	Nürnberg
13:00 CET (UTC+01)	Leibold 68'	Report		Stadium: Max-Morlock-Stadion; Attendance: 23,586; Referee: Patrick Alt; Man of the Match: Schuhen

11 December 2017 17	Fortuna Düsseldorf	0–2	1. FC Nürnberg	Düsseldorf
20:30 CET (UTC+01)		Report	Werner 67'; Margreitter 77'	Stadium: Esprit Arena; Attendance: 22,248; Referee: René Rohde; Man of the Match: Margreitter

16 December 2017 18	1. FC Kaiserslautern	1–1	1. FC Nürnberg	Kaiserslautern
13:00 CET (UTC+01)	Bredlow 61' (ogg.)	Report	Ishak 25'	Stadium: Fritz-Walter-Stadion; Attendance: 19,790; Referee: Christof Günsch; Man of the Match: Müller

23 January 2018 19	1. FC Nürnberg	2–2	SSV Jahn Regensburg	Nürnberg
20:30 CET (UTC+01)	Behrens 10'; Salli 49'	Report	Lais 6'; Grüttner 28'	Stadium: Max-Morlock-Stadion; Attendance: 26,231; Referee: Manuel Gräfe; Man of the Match: Vrenezi

26 January 2018 20	1. FC Union Berlin	0–1	1. FC Nürnberg	Berlin
18:30 CET (UTC+01)		Report	Ewerton 11'	Stadium: Stadion An der Alten Försterei; Attendance: 21,734; Referee: Patrick Ittrich; Man of the Match: Ewerton

2 February 2018 21	1. FC Nürnberg	4–1	FC Erzgebirge Aue	Nürnberg
18:30 CET (UTC+01)	Möhwald 37', 47'; Erras 71'; Werner 76'	Report	Soukou 72'	Stadium: Max-Morlock-Stadion; Attendance: 24,451; Referee: Johann Pfeifer; Man of the Match: Möhwald

12 February 2018 22	FC St. Pauli	0–0	1. FC Nürnberg	Hamburg
20:30 CET (UTC+01)		Report		Stadium: Millerntor-Stadion; Attendance: 29,313; Referee: Felix Zwayer; Man of the Match: Bredlow

18 February 2018 23	1. FC Nürnberg	3–1	MSV Duisburg	Nürnberg
13:30 CET (UTC+01)	Behrens 8', 23'; Löwen 71'	Report	Stoppelkamp 41'	Stadium: Max-Morlock-Stadion; Attendance: 25,257; Referee: Arne Aarnink; Man of the Match: Behrens

25 February 2018 24	VfL Bochum	0–0	1. FC Nürnberg	Bochum
13:30 CET (UTC+01)		Report		Stadium: Ruhrstadion; Attendance: 14,016; Referee: Lasse Koslowski; Man of the Match: Fabian

3 March 2018 25	1. FC Nürnberg	0–2	SpVgg Greuther Fürth	Nürnberg
13:00 CET (UTC+01)		Report	Narey 49'; Steininger 90'	Stadium: Max-Morlock-Stadion; Attendance: 47,489; Referee: Manuel Gräfe; Man of the Match: Narey

9 March 2018 26	Arminia Bielefeld	1–0	1. FC Nürnberg	Bielefeld
18:30 CET (UTC+01)	Kerschbaumer 90'	Report		Stadium: Bielefelder Alm; Attendance: 18,542; Referee: Robert Kampka; Man of the Match: Kerschbaumer

18 March 2018 27	1. FC Nürnberg	1–1	SV Darmstadt 98	Nürnberg
13:30 CET (UTC+01)	Margreitter 78'	Report	Boyd 18'	Stadium: Max-Morlock-Stadion; Attendance: 27,007; Referee: Daniel Schlager; Man of the Match: Stark

31 March 2018 28	Dynamo Dresden	1–1	1. FC Nürnberg	Dresden
13:00 CEST (UTC+02)	Benatelli 45'	Report	Behrens 53'	Stadium: DDV-Stadion; Attendance: 30,765; Referee: Bibiana Steinhaus; Man of the Match: Benatelli

7 April 2018 29	1. FC Nürnberg	3–2	1. FC Heidenheim	Nürnberg
13:00 CEST (UTC+02)	Behrens 30'; Löwen 31'; Stefaniak 38'	Report	Verhoek 28'; Dovedan 52'	Stadium: Max-Morlock-Stadion; Attendance: 29,351; Referee: Johann Pfeifer; Man of the Match: Ishak

15 April 2018 30	FC Ingolstadt 04	1–1	1. FC Nürnberg	Ingolstadt
13:30 CEST (UTC+02)	Leipertz 50'	Report	Zreľák 74'	Stadium: Audi-Sportpark; Attendance: 15,200 (sell-out); Referee: Frank Willenborg; Man of the Match: Ewerton

23 April 2018 31	Holstein Kiel	1–3	1. FC Nürnberg	Kiel
20:30 CEST (UTC+02)	Schindler 12' (pen.)	Report	Margreitter 9'; Behrens 25', 51'	Stadium: Holstein-Stadion; Attendance: 11,874; Referee: Harm Osmers; Man of the Match: Behrens

30 April 2018 32	1. FC Nürnberg	2–0	Eintracht Braunschweig	Nürnberg
20:30 CEST (UTC+02)	Petrák 45'; Möhwald 48'	Report		Stadium: Max-Morlock-Stadion; Attendance: 45,238; Referee: Felix Zwayer; Man of the Match: Leibold

6 May 2018 33	SV Sandhausen	0–2	1. FC Nürnberg	Sandhausen
15:30 CEST (UTC+02)		Report	Behrens 38'; Leibold 76'	Stadium: Hardtwaldstadion; Attendance: 12,537; Referee: Florian Heft; Man of the Match: Behrens

13 May 2018 34	1. FC Nürnberg	2–3	Fortuna Düsseldorf	Nürnberg
15:30 CEST (UTC+02)	Margreitter 6'; Leibold 12'	Report	Usami 37'; Gießelmann 59'; Ayhan 90'	Stadium: Max-Morlock-Stadion; Attendance: 50,000 (sell-out); Referee: Bibiana Steinhaus; Man of the Match: Gießelmann

=== DFB-Pokal ===
14 August 2017 First round	MSV Duisburg	1–2	1. FC Nürnberg	Duisburg
18:30 CEST (UTC+02:00)	Wolze 90' (pen.)	Report	Behrens 21'; Margreitter 41'	Stadium: MSV-Arena; Attendance: 15,576; Referee: Christian Dingert

25 October 2017 Second round	VfL Osnabrück	2–3	1. FC Nürnberg	Osnabrück
18:30 CEST (UTC+02:00)	Álvarez 4'; Groß 64'	Report	Iskak 38'; Leibold 50'; Valentini 72'	Stadium: Stadion an der Bremer Brücke; Attendance: 13,557; Referee: Bastian Dankert; Man of the Match: Valentini

19 December 2017 Last 16	1. FC Nürnberg	0–2 (a.e.t.)	VfL Wolfsburg	Nürnberg
20:45 CET (UTC+01:00)		Report	Uduokhai 96'; Didavi 118'	Stadium: Max-Morlock-Stadion; Attendance: 26,104; Referee: Daniel Siebert; Man of the Match: Uduokhai

== Overall ==
Matches played	34
Matches won	17
Matches drawn	9
Matches lost	8
Goals scored	61
Goals conceded	39
Goal difference	+22
Clean sheets	9
Yellow cards	
Red cards	1
Best result(s)	6–1 vs Duisburg
Worst result(s)	0–2 vs Fürth
Points earned	60/102
