= Simon Becher =

American soccer player (born 1999)

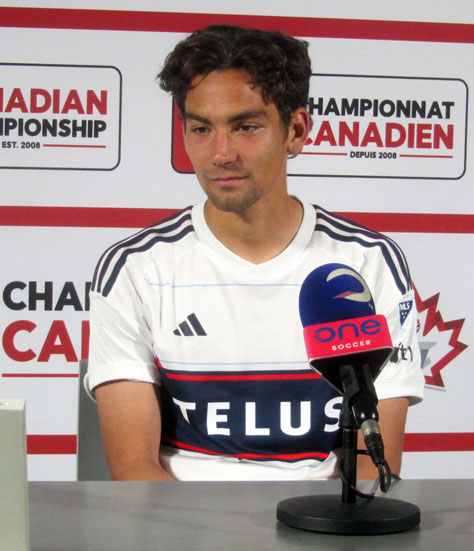
- Becher with the Vancouver Whitecaps in 2023

Personal information
- Full name: Simon Michael Becher
- Date of birth: July 20, 1999 (age 27)
- Place of birth: Topeka, Kansas, U.S.
- Height: 6 ft 1 in (1.85 m)
- Position: Forward

Team information
- Current team: St. Louis City
- Number: 11

College career
| Years | Team | Apps | (Gls) |
| 2018 | Holy Cross Crusaders | 17 | (7) |
| 2019–2021 | Saint Louis Billikens | 47 | (21) |

Senior career*
| Years | Team | Apps | (Gls) |
| 2019 | Reading United | 10 | (7) |
| 2021 | Ocean City Nor'easters | 12 | (11) |
| 2022 | Whitecaps FC 2 | 22 | (8) |
| 2022 | → Vancouver Whitecaps FC (loan) | 1 | (1) |
| 2023 | Vancouver Whitecaps FC | 19 | (4) |
| 2023 | → Whitecaps FC 2 (loan) | 1 | (0) |
| 2024–2025 | Horsens | 14 | (3) |
| 2024–2025 | → St. Louis City (loan) | 18 | (5) |
| 2025– | St. Louis City | 53 | (10) |
- * Club domestic league appearances and goals as of August 30, 2026

Simon Michael Becher (born July 20, 1999) is an American professional soccer player who plays as a forward for Major League Soccer club St. Louis City.

== Early life ==
Becher was born in Topeka, Kansas, and raised in Brooklyn, Connecticut. He went to high school at The Woodstock Academy in Woodstock, CT.

== College career ==
Becher played as a first year player for the Holy Cross Crusaders before transferring. Becher appeared in 47 games at Saint Louis University and during that time he scored 21 goals and had 13 assists. At the end of his collegiate career, he was named Saint Louis University's Most Outstanding Male Athlete.

== Club career ==
In 2019, Becher played with Reading United AC in USL League Two. In 2021, he played with the Ocean City Nor'easters.

In January 2022, Becher was drafted by the Whitecaps in the 1st round (16th pick) of the 2022 MLS SuperDraft. In March 2022, he signed a professional contract with the second team, Whitecaps FC 2 in MLS Next Pro. He led the team in scoring that season with eight goals.

On August 4, 2022, he joined the Whitecaps first team on a short-term loan. He made his Major League Soccer debut on August 5, scoring his first goal as well against the Houston Dynamo. In September, he signed a second short-term loan agreement. In November 2022, he signed a contract with the first team for the 2023 season, with club options for the following three seasons. Following his two-goal performance on April 1 against CF Montreal, he set an MLS record becoming the fastest player in MLS history to score his first four goals – in only 87 minutes of action (across three games). The performance earned him MLS Player of the Week honors.

The Whitecaps transferred Becher to Danish 1st Division club AC Horsens on January 17, 2024. Seven months later, Becher returned to MLS, joining St. Louis City on a one-year loan deal until June 2025. On April 25, 2025, St. Louis opted to make the loan permanent.

== Career statistics ==
=== Club ===
As of match played on April 20, 2025

Club statistics
| Club | Season | League | | | Playoffs | | National cup (Note: Includes U.S. Open Cup) | | Continental | | Other | | Total | |
| Club | Season | Division | Apps | Goals | Apps | Goals | Apps | Goals | Apps | Goals | Apps | Goals | Apps | Goals |
|---|---|---|---|---|---|---|---|---|---|---|---|---|---|---|
| Reading United AC | 2019 | USL League Two | 10 | 7 | — | | 2 | 0 | — | | — | | 12 | 7 |
| Ocean City Nor'easters | 2021 | USL League Two | 12 | 11 | 2 | 1 | — | | — | | — | | 14 | 12 |
| Whitecaps FC 2 | 2022 | MLS Next Pro | 22 | 8 | — | | — | | — | | — | | 22 | 8 |
| Vancouver Whitecaps FC (loan) | 2022 | MLS | 1 | 1 | — | | — | | — | | — | | 1 | 1 |
| Vancouver Whitecaps FC | 2023 | MLS | 19 | 4 | 1 | 0 | 2 | 2 | 2 (Note: Appearances in CONCACAF Champions Cup) | 1 | 1 (Note: Appearances in Leagues Cup) | 0 | 25 | 7 |
| Whitecaps FC 2 (loan) | 2023 | MLS Next Pro | 1 | 0 | — | | — | | — | | — | | 1 | 0 |
| AC Horsens | 2023–2024 | Danish 1st Division | 14 | 3 | — | | — | | — | | — | | 14 | 3 |
| St. Louis City SC (loan) | 2024 | MLS | 9 | 4 | — | | — | | — | | 4 | 2 | 13 | 6 |
| St. Louis City SC (loan) | 2025 | MLS | 9 | 1 | — | | — | | — | | — | | 9 | 1 |
| St. Louis City SC (loan) | Total | | 18 | 5 | 0 | 0 | 0 | 0 | 0 | 0 | 4 | 2 | 22 | - |
| St. Louis City SC | 2025 | MLS | 0 | 0 | — | | — | | — | | — | | 0 | 0 |
| Career totals | | | 83 | 36 | 3 | 1 | 4 | 2 | 2 | 1 | 1 | 0 | 93 | 40 |

== Honors ==
Vancouver Whitecaps

- Canadian Championship: 2023
