= Alessandro Schöpf =

Austrian footballer

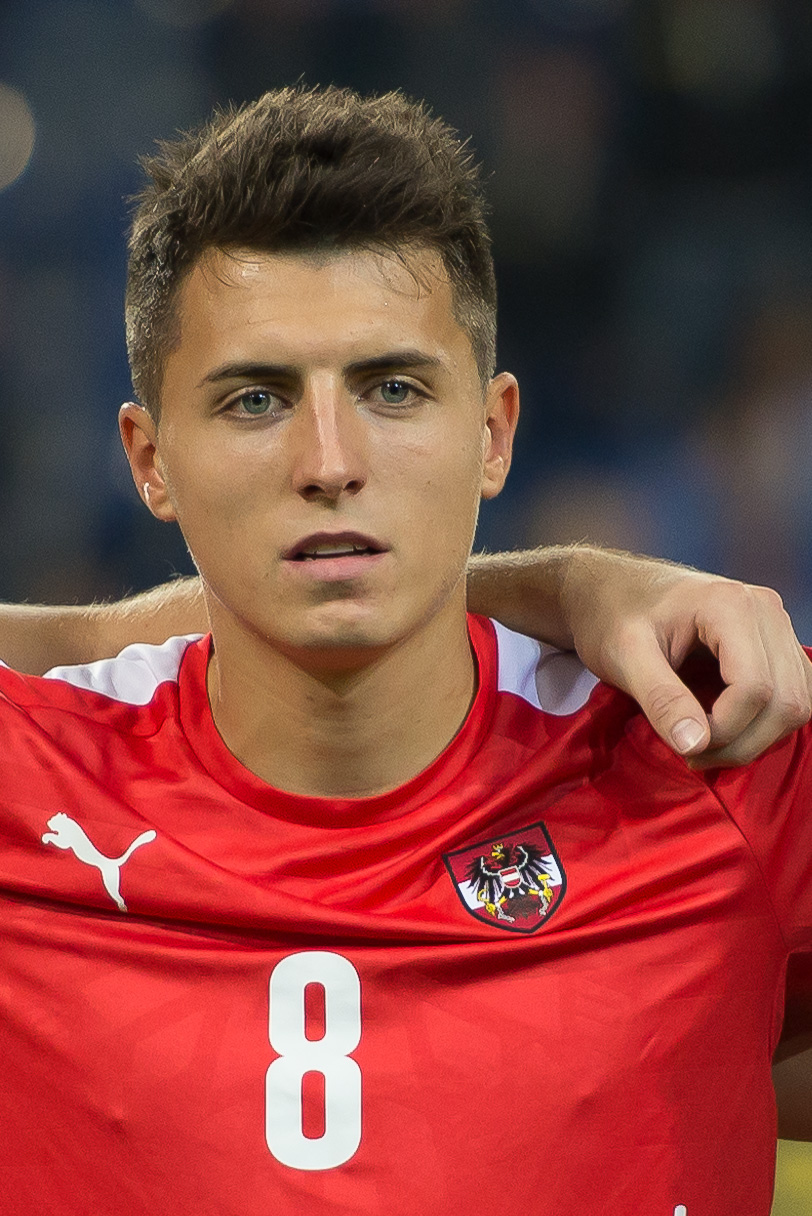
- Schöpf with Austria U21 in 2014

Personal information
- Full name: Alessandro André Schöpf
- Date of birth: 7 February 1994 (age 32)
- Place of birth: Umhausen, Tyrol, Austria
- Height: 1.78 m (5 ft 10 in)
- Position: Midfielder

Team information
- Current team: LASK
- Number: 18

Youth career
- 1999–2007: SV Längenfeld
- 2007–2009: AKA Tirol
- 2009–2012: Bayern Munich

Senior career*
Years	Team	Apps	(Gls)
2012–2014	Bayern Munich II	63	(22)
2014–2016	1. FC Nürnberg	51	(11)
2016–2021	Schalke 04	112	(10)
2017–2019	Schalke 04 II	3	(1)
2021–2022	Arminia Bielefeld	33	(1)
2022–2024	Vancouver Whitecaps FC	65	(2)
2025–2026	Wolfsberger AC	32	(7)
2026–	LASK	9	(2)

International career^{‡}
2012–2013	Austria U19	10	(2)
2013–2016	Austria U21	20	(8)
2016–	Austria	35	(6)
- * Club domestic league appearances and goals as of 31 October 2026 ‡ National team caps and goals as of 23:23, 18 November 2025 (UTC)

Alessandro André Schöpf (German pronunciation: [aleˈsandʁo ˈʃœpf]; born 7 February 1994) is an Austrian professional footballer who plays as a midfielder for Austrian Bundesliga club LASK and the Austria national team.

== Club career ==
=== Bayern Munich II ===
Schöpf joined Bayern Munich in 2009 and spent three years in the junior team before being promoted to the reserve squad in 2012. He made his debut on the opening day of the 2012–13 season in a 1–1 draw with Augsburg II, and would go on to make another 28 appearances as Bayern II finished in second place in the Regionalliga Bayern. His eleven goals that season made him the team's top scorer, behind Marius Duhnke with fourteen. The following season, Schöpf made 34 appearances, again scoring 11 goals, as Bayern II won the Regionalliga Bayern title, but missed out on promotion after losing on away goals in a playoff against SC Fortuna Köln. In November 2013, Schöpf along with teammate Julian Green was given a first-team contract, although he made no appearances during the 2013–14 season as Bayern went on to win the Bundesliga and DFB-Pokal.

=== 1. FC Nürnberg ===
In July 2014, Schöpf signed for 2. Bundesliga club 1. FC Nürnberg, and was one of six new players to make their debut for the club on the opening day of the 2014–15 season, a 1–0 win over Erzgebirge Aue.

=== Schalke 04 ===
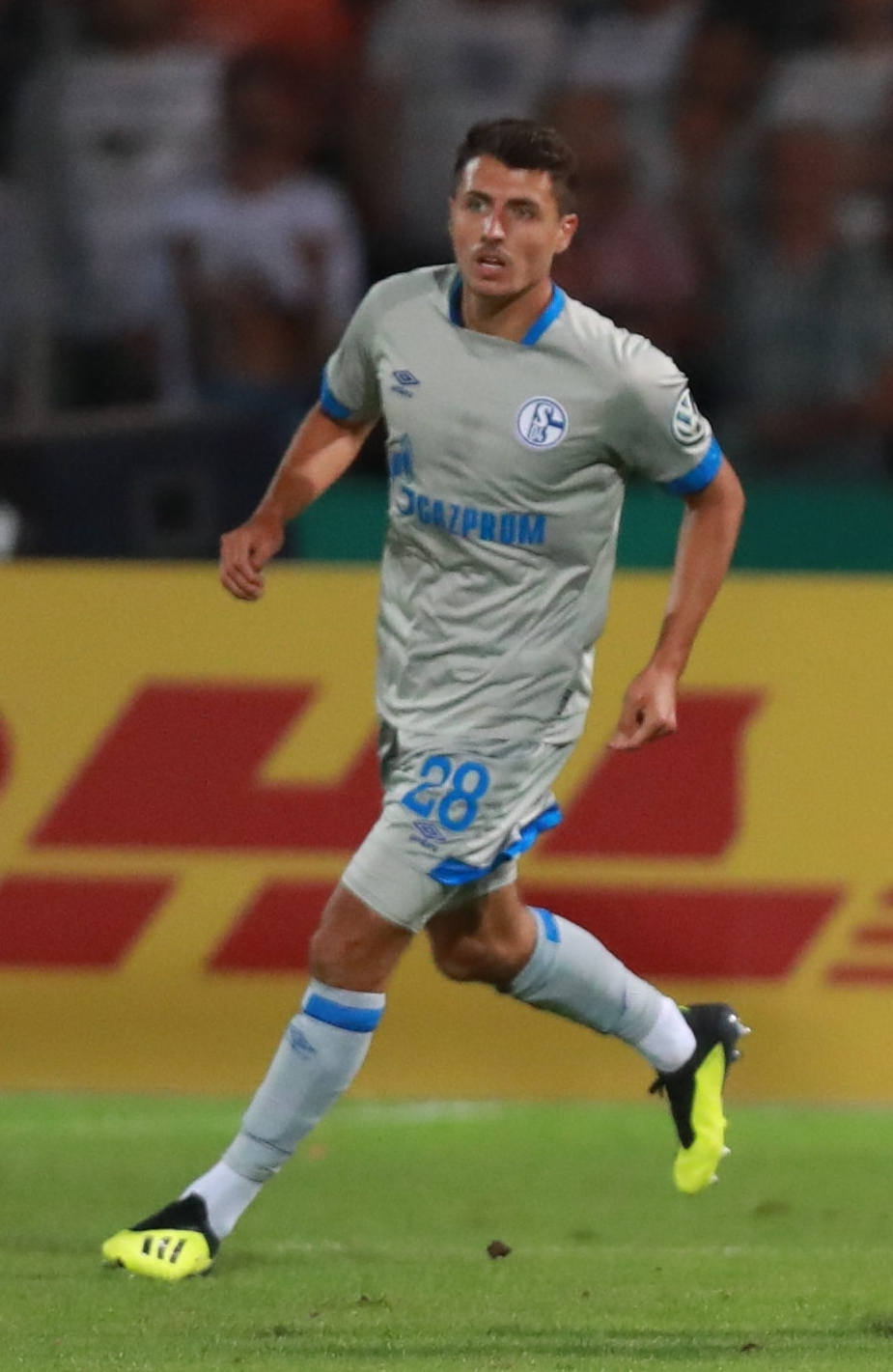
Schöpf with Schalke 04 in 2018

In January 2016, Schöpf moved to Schalke 04 and signed a contract until 2019. Despite suffering a cruciate knee injury, he impressed Schalke manager Domenico Tedesco enough to earn a contract extension to 2021, being praised by Tedesco as "Almost a complete player. He is very diligent and runs many, many kilometres in each game. He is versatile and always wants to play, no matter which position it is. In addition, he is technically savvy, is brave and a great person. We're delighted to be able to continue working with him."

=== Arminia Bielefeld ===
On 19 July 2021, Schöpf joined Bundesliga club Arminia Bielefeld after signing a two-year contract. He left Arminia as it was relegated from Bundesliga at the end of the 2021–22 season.

=== Vancouver Whitecaps ===
On 3 August 2022, Schöpf joined the MLS club Vancouver Whitecaps FC signing through the 2024 season with a club option for 2025.

=== Wolfsberger AC ===
On 6 February 2025, Schöpf signed with Wolfsberger AC.

== International career ==
Schöpf has represented Austria at under-16, under-18, under-19 and under-21 level.

He made his senior debut for Austria on 27 March 2016, coming on as 87th-minute substitute in a friendly against Albania. He was selected for the UEFA Euro 2016, scoring his first goal in a pre-tournament friendly against Malta on 31 May. He scored Austria's only goal of the tournament, equalising against Iceland as they finished bottom of the group with only one point. In May 2021, he was named in the 26-man squad for the Euro 2020.

On 18 May 2026, Schöpf was selected in Ralf Rangnick’s 26-man squad for the 2026 FIFA World Cup, marking Austria’s first appearance in the tournament since 1998.

== Career statistics ==
=== Club ===
As of 3 November 2026

Appearances and goals by club, season and competition
Club	Season	League			Cup		Europe		Other		Total	
Club	Season	Division	Apps	Goals	Apps	Goals	Apps	Goals	Apps	Goals	Apps	Goals
Bayern Munich II	2012–13	Regionalliga Bayern	29	11	—		—		—		29	11
Bayern Munich II	2013–14	Regionalliga Bayern	34	11	—		—		2 (Note: Appearances in the Regionalliga promotion play-off.)	0	36	11
Bayern Munich II	Total		63	22	—		—		2	0	65	22
Nürnberg	2014–15	2. Bundesliga	32	5	1	0	—		—		33	5
Nürnberg	2015–16	2. Bundesliga	19	6	3	0	—		—		22	6
Nürnberg	Total		51	11	4	0	—		—		55	11
Schalke 04	2015–16	Bundesliga	13	3	0	0	2 (Note: Appearances in the UEFA Europa League.)	0	—		15	3
Schalke 04	2016–17	Bundesliga	28	6	4	1	10	1	—		42	8
Schalke 04	2017–18	Bundesliga	15	0	4	0	—		—		19	0
Schalke 04	2018–19	Bundesliga	15	1	2	0	4 (Note: Appearances in the UEFA Champions League.)	1	—		21	2
Schalke 04	2019–20	Bundesliga	22	0	3	1	—		—		25	1
Schalke 04	2020–21	Bundesliga	19	0	2	2	—		—		21	2
Schalke 04	Total		112	10	15	4	16	2	—		143	16
Schalke 04 II	2017–18	Oberliga Westfalen	1	1	—		—		—		1	1
Schalke 04 II	2019–20	Regionalliga West	2	0	—		—		—		2	0
Schalke 04 II	Total		3	1	—		—		—		3	1
Arminia Bielefeld	2021–22	Bundesliga	31	1	2	0	—		—		33	1
Vancouver Whitecaps	2022	MLS	7	0	—		—		—		7	0
Vancouver Whitecaps	2023	MLS	28	1	—		—		6 (Note: Three appearances in Leagues Cup, one appearance in Canadian Championship, two appearances in MLS Cup playoffs)	0	34	1
Vancouver Whitecaps	2024	MLS	30	1	—		2 (Note: Appearances in CONCACAF Champions Cup)	0	11 (Note: Three appearances in Leagues Cup, four appearances in Canadian Championship, four appearances in MLS Cup playoffs)	0	43	1
Vancouver Whitecaps	Total		65	2	—		2	0	17	0	84	2
Wolfsberger AC	2024–25	Austrian Bundesliga	8	2	1	0	—		—		9	2
Wolfsberger AC	2025–26	Austrian Bundesliga	24	5	4	0	4 (Note: Two appearances in UEFA Europa League, two appearances in UEFA Conference League)	0	1 (Note: Appearance in European play-offs)	0	33	5
Wolfsberger AC	Total		32	7	5	0	4	0	1	0	42	7
LASK	2026–27	Austrian Bundesliga	9	2	2	0	6 (Note: Appearances in UEFA Champions League)	0	—		17	2
Career total			366	56	28	4	27	2	21	0	442	62

=== International ===
As of match played 18 November 2025

Appearances and goals by national team and year
National team	Year	Apps	Goals
Austria	2016	11	2
Austria	2017	2	0
Austria	2018	9	2
Austria	2019	0	0
Austria	2020	2	1
Austria	2021	7	0
Austria	2022	1	1
Austria	2023	0	0
Austria	2024	0	0
Austria	2025	3	0
Total		35	6

Scores and results list Austria's goal tally first, score column indicates score after each Schöpf goal.

List of international goals scored by Alessandro Schöpf
No.	Date	Venue	Cap	Opponent	Score	Result	Competition
1	31 May 2016	Wörthersee Stadion, Klagenfurt, Austria	3	Malta	2–0	2–1	Friendly
2	22 June 2016	Stade de France, Saint-Denis, France	7	Iceland	1–1	1–2	UEFA Euro 2016
3	30 May 2018	Tivoli-Neu, Innsbruck, Austria	16	Russia	1–0	1–0	Friendly
4	2 June 2018	Wörthersee Stadion, Klagenfurt, Austria	17	Germany	2–1	2–1	Friendly
5	14 October 2020	Ilie Oană Stadium, Ploiești, Romania	24	Romania	1–0	1–0	2020–21 UEFA Nations League B
6	29 March 2022	Ernst-Happel-Stadion, Vienna, Austria	32	Scotland	2–2	2–2	Friendly

== Honours ==
Bayern Munich II

- Regionalliga Bayern: 2013–14
