= 2014–15 1. FC Nürnberg season =

1. FC Nürnberg
2014–15 season
- Manager: Valérien Ismaël / René Weiler
- Stadium: Frankenstadion
- 2. Bundesliga: 9th
- DFB-Pokal: 1st Round (knocked out)
- Top goalscorer: League: Sylvestr (9); All: Sylvestr (9)
- Highest home attendance: 47,501 vs Fürth
- Lowest home attendance: 25,130 vs Kaiserslautern
- Average home league attendance: 30,743
Home colours	Away colours	Third colours

The 2014–15 1. FC Nürnberg season is the 115th season in the club's football history.

== Review and events ==
In 2014–15 the club plays in the 2. Bundesliga.

The club also took part in the 2014–15 edition of the DFB-Pokal, the German Cup, where it was knocked out by 3. Liga side MSV Duisburg, losing 0–1.

== Matches ==
=== Legend ===
Win Draw Loss Postponed

=== Friendly matches ===
28 June 2014	TSV 09 Gräfenberg	0–13	1. FC Nürnberg	Gräfenberg
16:00 CEST (UTC+02)				Attendance: 1.200

2 July 2014	TSV 1860 Weißenburg	0–10	1. FC Nürnberg	Weißenburg
18:30 CEST (UTC+02)				Attendance: 2,500

9 July 2014	Kempten Selection	0–7	1. FC Nürnberg	Kempten
18:30 CEST (UTC+02)				Attendance: 720

13 July 2014	FC Terek Grozny	1–2	1. FC Nürnberg	Mindelheim
15:00 CEST (UTC+02)				Attendance: 500

19 July 2014	1. FC Nürnberg	3–1	Valencia CF	Weismain
17:00 CEST (UTC+02)				Stadium: Waldstadion; Attendance: 3,500

22 July 2014	1. FC Nürnberg	1–2	FC Ingolstadt 04	Roth
17:30 CEST (UTC+02)				Attendance: 2,600

27 July 2014	1. FC Nürnberg	1–1	RCD Mallorca	Nuremberg
15:30 CEST (UTC+02)				Stadium: Frankenstadion; Attendance: 10,379; Referee: Benjamin Cortus

2 September 2014	FSV Erlangen-Bruck	1–4	1. FC Nürnberg	Erlangen
18:00 CEST (UTC+02)				Stadium: Sportanlage Erlangen-Bruck; Attendance: 800; Referee: Benjamin Cortus

5 September 2014	1. FC Nürnberg	3–3	FK Baník Most	Nuremberg
17:00 CEST (UTC+02)				Stadium: Valznerweiher; Attendance: 500; Referee: Benjamin Cortus

10 October 2014	1. FC Nürnberg	3–2	SK Slavia Prague	Nuremberg
16:00 CEST (UTC+02)				Stadium: Valznerweiher; Attendance: 500; Referee: Benjamin Brand

13 January 2015	VfB Stuttgart	2–0	1. FC Nürnberg	Stuttgart
15:00 CET (UTC+01)				Stadium: Robert-Schlienz-Stadion; Attendance: 0 Referee: Martin Petersen

17 January 2015	1. FC Nürnberg	1–2	SCR Altach	Nuremberg
14:00 CET (UTC+02)				Stadium: Valznerweiher; Attendance: 550; Referee: Benjamin Cortus

21 January 2015	1. FC Nürnberg	3–1	Jeju United FC	Belek, Turkey
14:00 CET (UTC+02)				Attendance: 250; Referee: Lasse Koslowski

24 January 2015	1. FC Nürnberg	2–0	FC Aarau	Belek, Turkey
15:00 CET (UTC+02)				Attendance: 80; Referee: Patrick Alt

=== DFB-Pokal ===
15 August 2014 Round 1	MSV Duisburg	1–0	1. FC Nürnberg	Duisburg
20:00 CEST (UTC+02)	Janjić 11' (pen.)	Match Report		Stadium: MSV-Arena; Attendance: 18,108; Referee: Christian Dingert

=== 2. Bundesliga ===
==== League results and fixtures ====
3 August 2014 1	1. FC Nürnberg	1–0	FC Erzgebirge Aue	Nuremberg
15:30 CEST (UTC+02)	Sylvestr 69'	Match Report		Stadium: Frankenstadion; Attendance: 37,116; Referee: Sascha Stegemann; Man of the Match: Polák

11 August 2014 2	SpVgg Greuther Fürth	5–1	1. FC Nürnberg	Fürth
20:15 CEST (UTC+02)	Baba 8', 57'; Šukalo 17' (pen.); Weilandt 76'; Žulj 87'	Match Report	35' Pinola	Stadium: Stadion am Laubenweg; Attendance: 17,200 (sell-out); Referee: Wolfgang Stark; Man of the Match: Baba

23 August 2014 3	1. FC Nürnberg	0–1	FSV Frankfurt	Nuremberg
13:00 CEST (UTC+02)		Match Report	29' Balitsch	Stadium: Frankenstadion; Attendance: 26,856; Referee: Bastian Dankert; Man of the Match: Klandt

29 August 2014 4	1. FC Union Berlin	0–4	1. FC Nürnberg	Berlin
18:30 CEST (UTC+02)		Match Report	7' Candeias; 30' Gebhart; 67' Mlapa; 78' Koch	Stadium: Stadion An der Alten Försterei; Attendance: 20,421; Referee: Frank Willenborg; Man of the Match: Candeias

15 September 2014 5	1. FC Nürnberg	0–2	Fortuna Düsseldorf	Nuremberg
20:15 CEST (UTC+02)		Match Report	23' Hoffer; 62' da Silva Pinto	Stadium: Frankenstadion; Attendance: 26,558; Referee: F. Meyer; Man of the Match: Hoffer

21 September 2014 6	Karlsruher SC	3–0	1. FC Nürnberg	Karlsruhe
13:30 CEST (UTC+02)	Yamada 9'; Yabo 20', 40'	Match Report		Stadium: Wildparkstadion; Attendance: 19,944; Referee: Daniel Siebert; Man of the Match: Yabo

24 September 2014 7	1. FC Heidenheim	3–0	1. FC Nürnberg	Heidenheim
17:30 CEST (UTC+02)	Schnatterer 3'; Kraus 9'; Mayer 59' (pen.)	Match Report		Stadium: Voith-Arena; Attendance: 13,000 (sell-out); Referee: René Rohde; Man of the Match: Kraus

29 September 2014 8	1. FC Nürnberg	3–2	1. FC Kaiserslautern	Nuremberg
20:15 CEST (UTC+02)	Candeias 24'; Schöpf 41', 51'	Match Report	62' Ring; 71' Löwe	Stadium: Frankenstadion; Attendance: 25,130; Referee: Thorsten Kinhöfer; Man of the Match: Schöpf

3 October 2014 9	VfL Bochum	1–1	1. FC Nürnberg	Bochum
18:30 CEST (UTC+02)	Gregoritsch 44'	Match Report	56' Sylvestr	Stadium: Ruhrstadion; Attendance: 25,094; Referee: Peter Gagelmann; Man of the Match: Gregoritsch

17 October 2014 10	1. FC Nürnberg	1–0	RB Leipzig	Nuremberg
20:30 CEST (UTC+02)	Schöpf 74'	Match Report		Stadium: Frankenstadion; Attendance: 28,571; Referee: Jochen Drees; Man of the Match: Schöpf

27 October 2014 11	SV Darmstadt 98	3–0	1. FC Nürnberg	Darmstadt
20:15 CET (UTC+01)	Stroh-Engel 39'; Balogun 70'; Kempe 82'	Match Report		Stadium: Stadion am Böllenfalltor; Attendance: 16,150 (sell-out); Referee: Martin Petersen; Man of the Match: Heller

1 November 2014 12	1. FC Nürnberg	2–2	FC St. Pauli	Nuremberg
13:00 CET (UTC+01)	Sylvestr 18', 87'	Match Report	1' Rzatkowski; 59' Maier	Stadium: Frankenstadion; Attendance: 37,033; Referee: Bibiana Steinhaus; Man of the Match: Sylvestr

7 November 2014 13	SV Sandhausen	2–1	1. FC Nürnberg	Sandhausen
18:30 CET (UTC+01)	Bieler 26'; Wooten 77'	Match Report	16' Füllkrug	Stadium: Hardtwaldstadion; Attendance: 6,436; Referee: Norbert Grudzinski; Man of the Match: Knaller

23 November 2014 14	1. FC Nürnberg	2–1	FC Ingolstadt 04	Nuremberg
13:30 CET (UTC+01)	R. Koch 16'; Sylvestr 25'	Match Report	71' Mo. Hartmann	Stadium: Frankenstadion; Attendance: 32,065; Referee: Peter Sippel; Man of the Match: Rakovsky

1 December 2014 15	Eintracht Braunschweig	1–0	1. FC Nürnberg	Braunschweig
20:15 CET (UTC+01)	Nielsen 38'	Match Report		Stadium: Eintracht-Stadion; Attendance: 21,515; Referee: Guido Winkmann; Man of the Match: Nielsen

8 December 2014 16	1. FC Nürnberg	2–1	TSV 1860 München	Nuremberg
20:15 CET (UTC+01)	Schöpf 14'; Sylvestr 17'	Match Report	28' (ogg.) Mössmer	Stadium: Frankenstadion; Attendance: 31,079; Referee: Robert Kampka; Man of the Match: Schöpf

14 December 2014 17	VfR Aalen	1–2	1. FC Nürnberg	Aalen
13:30 CET (UTC+01)	Gjasula 64' (pen.)	Match Report	11', 60' Füllkrug	Stadium: Scholz-Arena; Attendance: 11,184; Referee: Frank Willenborg; Man of the Match: Füllkrug

17 December 2014 18	FC Erzgebirge Aue	0–1	1. FC Nürnberg	Aue
17:30 CET (UTC+01)		Match Report	64' Sylvestr	Stadium: Erzgebirgsstadion; Attendance: 8,200; Referee: Tobias Stieler; Man of the Match: Sylvestr

20 December 2014 19	1. FC Nürnberg	0–0	SpVgg Greuther Fürth	Nuremberg
13:00 CET (UTC+01)		Match Report		Stadium: Frankenstadion; Attendance: 47,501; Referee: Florian Meyer; Man of the Match: Röcker

8 February 2015 20	FSV Frankfurt	2–1	1. FC Nürnberg	Frankfurt
13:30 CET (UTC+01)	Roshi 21'; Grifo 60'	Match Report	41' Hovland	Stadium: Stadion am Bornheimer Hang; Attendance: 9,152; Referee: Harm Osmers; Man of the Match: Grifo

15 February 2015 21	1. FC Nürnberg	3–1	1. FC Union Berlin	Nuremberg
13:30 CET (UTC+01)	Mlapa 4'; Sylvestr 54', 87'	Match Report	17' Polter	Stadium: Frankenstadion; Attendance: 29,166; Referee: Robert Kempter; Man of the Match: Sylvestr

22 February 2015 22	Fortuna Düsseldorf	1–3	1. FC Nürnberg	Düsseldorf
13:30 CET (UTC+01)	Pohjanpalo 67'	Match Report	71' Stark; 77' Blum; 88' Kerk	Stadium: Esprit Arena; Attendance: 30,213; Referee: Tobias Stieler; Man of the Match: Füllkrug

28 February 2015 23	1. FC Nürnberg	1–1	Karlsruher SC	Nuremberg
13:00 CET (UTC+01)	Burgstaller 4'	Match Report	45' Hennings	Stadium: Frankenstadion; Attendance: 30,458; Referee: Guido Winkmann; Man of the Match: Burgstaller

6 March 2015 24	1. FC Nürnberg	0–1	1. FC Heidenheim	Nuremberg
18:30 CET (UTC+01)		Match Report	28' Wittek	Stadium: Frankenstadion; Attendance: 31,263; Referee: Frank Willenborg; Man of the Match: Wittek

14 March 2015 25	1. FC Kaiserslautern	2–1	1. FC Nürnberg	Kaiserslautern
13:00 CET (UTC+01)	Ring 14'; Hofmann 30'	Match Report	90' Schöpf	Stadium: Fritz-Walter-Stadion; Attendance: 35,830; Referee: Tobias Welz; Man of the Match: Ring

23 March 2015 26	1. FC Nürnberg	1–2	VfL Bochum	Nuremberg
20:15 CET (UTC+01)	Mlapa 70'	Match Report	38' Terrazzino; 64' Terodde	Stadium: Frankenstadion; Attendance: 25,528; Referee: Harm Osmers; Man of the Match: Esser

5 April 2015 27	RB Leipzig	2–1	1. FC Nürnberg	Leipzig
13:30 CEST (UTC+02)	Reyna 46'; Kaiser 76'	Match Report	29' Burgstaller	Stadium: Red Bull Arena; Attendance: 30,479; Referee: Sven Jablonski; Man of the Match: Coltorti

10 April 2015 28	1. FC Nürnberg	1–1	SV Darmstadt 98	Nuremberg
18:45 CEST (UTC+02)	Burgstaller 34'	Match Report	73' Sailer	Stadium: Frankenstadion; Attendance: 30,648; Referee: Sascha Stegemann; Man of the Match: Sailer

17 April 2015 29	FC St. Pauli	1–0	1. FC Nürnberg	Hamburg
18:30 CEST (UTC+02)	Sobiech 90'	Match Report		Stadium: Millerntor-Stadion; Attendance: 23,854 (sell-out); Referee: Manuel Gräfe; Man of the Match: Himmelmann

24 April 2015 30	1. FC Nürnberg	2–0	SV Sandhausen	Nuremberg
18:30 CEST (UTC+02)	Kerk 75'; Burgstaller 90'	Match Report		Stadium: Frankenstadion; Attendance: 25,233; Referee: Martin Petersen; Man of the Match: Pinola

4 May 2015 31	FC Ingolstadt 04	1–1	1. FC Nürnberg	Ingolstadt
20:15 CEST (UTC+02)	Pinola 70' (ogg.)	Match Report	72' Blum	Stadium: Audi Sportpark; Attendance: 15,000 (sell-out); Referee: Markus Schmidt; Man of the Match: Hovland

10 May 2015 32	1. FC Nürnberg	3–1	Eintracht Braunschweig	Nuremberg
13:30 CEST (UTC+02)	Reichel 32' (ogg.); Blum 52'; Burgstaller 67'	Match Report	68' Berggreen	Stadium: Frankenstadion; Attendance: 27,985; Referee: René Rohde; Man of the Match: Burgstaller

17 May 2015 33	TSV 1860 München	2–1	1. FC Nürnberg	Munich
15:30 CEST (UTC+02)	Vallori 56'; Adlung 72' (pen.)	Match Report	45' Stark	Stadium: Allianz Arena; Attendance: 68,500; Referee: Jochen Drees; Man of the Match: Adlung

24 May 2015 34	1. FC Nürnberg	2–1	VfR Aalen	Nuremberg
15:30 CEST (UTC+02)	Bulthuis 28'; Burgstaller 87'	Match Report	50' J. Gjasula	Stadium: Frankenstadion; Attendance: 30,433; Referee: Sascha Stegemann; Man of the Match: Bulthuis

==== League table ====
Pos	Team	Pld	W	D	L	GF	GA	GD	Pts
7	Union Berlin	34	12	11	11	46	51	−5	47
8	1. FC Heidenheim	34	12	10	12	49	44	+5	46
9	1. FC Nürnberg	34	13	6	15	42	47	−5	45
10	Fortuna Düsseldorf	34	11	11	12	48	52	−4	44
11	VfL Bochum	34	9	15	10	53	55	−2	42

Source: DFB
Rules for classification: 1) Points; 2) Goal difference; 3) Goals scored

=== Overall ===
Matches played	34
Matches won	13
Matches drawn	6
Matches lost	15
Goals scored	42
Goals conceded	47
Goal difference	−5
Clean sheets	6
Yellow cards	
Red cards	5
Best result(s)	4–0 vs Union Berlin
Worst result(s)	1–5 vs Fürth
Points earned	45/102
