= Cedric Teuchert =

German footballer (born 1997)

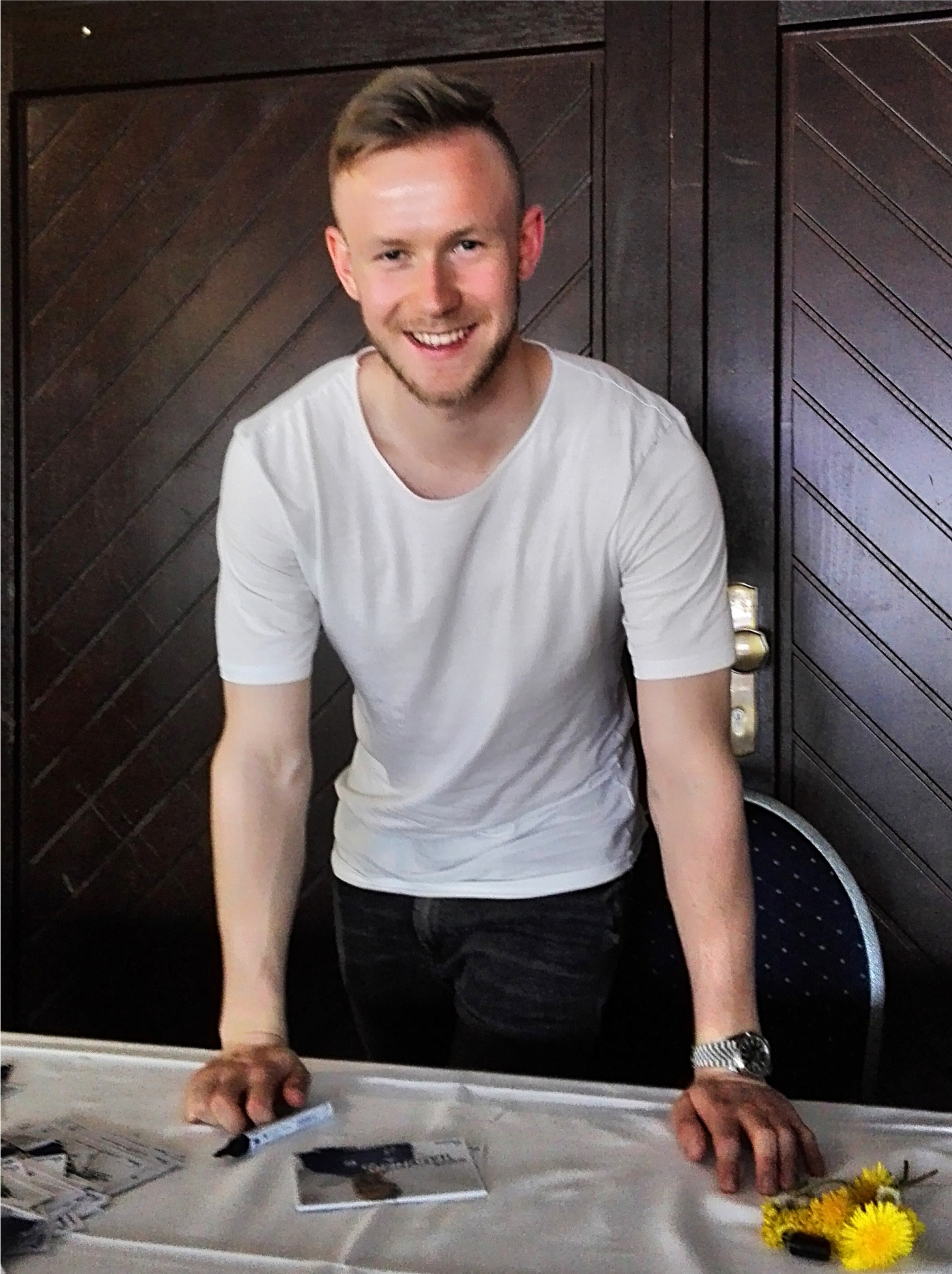
- Teuchert in 2018

Personal information
- Full name: Cedric Teuchert
- Date of birth: 14 January 1997 (age 29)
- Place of birth: Coburg, Germany
- Height: 1.83 m (6 ft 0 in)
- Position: Forward

Team information
- Current team: St. Louis City
- Number: 36

Youth career
- 2001–2009: DVV Coburg
- 2009–2015: 1. FC Nürnberg

Senior career*
Years	Team	Apps	(Gls)
2014–2016	1. FC Nürnberg II	13	(5)
2014–2018	1. FC Nürnberg	41	(11)
2018–2020	Schalke 04	9	(0)
2019	Schalke 04 II	2	(3)
2019–2020	→ Hannover 96 (loan)	23	(6)
2020–2021	Union Berlin	30	(3)
2022–2024	Hannover 96	70	(27)
2024–2026	St. Louis City	49	(10)

International career
2011	Germany U15	1	(1)
2012–2013	Germany U16	11	(3)
2014	Germany U17	3	(0)
2015	Germany U18	3	(1)
2016	Germany U19	6	(2)
2016	Germany U20	2	(1)
2017–2018	Germany U21	8	(8)
2021	Germany Olympic	3	(0)
- * Club domestic league appearances and goals as of 26 May 2026

Cedric Teuchert (German pronunciation: [ˈtɔʏ̯çɐt]; born 14 January 1997) is a German professional footballer who plays as a forward. He is a free agent, most recently playing for MLS club St. Louis City SC.

== Club career ==
Teuchert made his 2. Bundesliga debut with 1. FC Nürnberg in 2014 as a 17-year-old. In the first half of the 2017–18 season he scored six goals and made two assists in 15 league matches. In his time at the club, he made a total of 45 appearances, scoring 11 goals and assisting six times.

On 3 January 2018, it was announced that Teuchert had joined Bundesliga club FC Schalke 04 from 1. FC Nürnberg for a reported €1 million transfer fee, agreeing a 3 1/2-year contract.

Teuchert joined Union Berlin on 1 August 2020.

On 2 January 2022, Teuchert returned to Hannover 96 and signed a contract until 30 June 2024.

On 28 May 2024, Teuchert was transferred to MLS club St. Louis City SC. Teuchert was St. Louis City's leading goal scorer in the 2024 season, scoring 7 goals across all competitions.

On 26 May 2026, it was announced that Teuchert would be departing St. Louis City SC upon the expiration of his contract on 30 June 2026.

== International career ==
Teuchert is a former youth international for Germany. In October 2017, he made his debut for the U21 side.

== Career statistics ==
As of match played 20 October 2024

Appearances and goals by club, season and competition
Club	Season	League			Cup		Europe		Other		Total	
Club	Season	League	Apps	Goals	Apps	Goals	Apps	Goals	Apps	Goals	Apps	Goals
1. FC Nürnberg	2014–15	2. Bundesliga	1	0	0	0	—		—		1	0
1. FC Nürnberg	2015–16	2. Bundesliga	4	1	0	0	—		—		4	1
1. FC Nürnberg	2016–17	2. Bundesliga	21	4	2	0	—		—		23	4
1. FC Nürnberg	2017–18	2. Bundesliga	15	6	2	0	—		—		17	6
1. FC Nürnberg	Total		41	11	4	0	—		—		45	11
Schalke 04	2017–18	Bundesliga	4	0	2	0	—		—		6	0
Schalke 04	2018–19	Bundesliga	5	0	2	0	2 (Note: Appearances in UEFA Champions League)	0	—		9	0
Schalke 04	Total		9	0	4	0	2	0	—		15	0
Hannover 96 (loan)	2019–20	2. Bundesliga	23	6	1	0	—		—		24	6
Union Berlin	2020–21	Bundesliga	24	3	2	0	—		—		26	3
Union Berlin	2021–22	Bundesliga	6	0	1	0	4 (Note: Appearances in UEFA Europa Conference League)	0	—		11	0
Union Berlin	Total		30	3	3	0	4	0	—		37	3
Hannover 96	2021–22	2. Bundesliga	14	2	1	0	—		—		15	2
Hannover 96	2022–23	2. Bundesliga	29	14	1	0	—		—		30	14
Hannover 96	2023–24	2. Bundesliga	27	11	1	1	—		—		28	12
Hannover 96	Total		70	27	3	1	—		—		73	28
St. Louis City	2024	MLS	10	5	—		—		4 (Note: Appearances in Leagues Cup)	2	14	7
Career total			183	52	15	1	6	0	4	2	208	55
