= 2016–17 1. FC Nürnberg season =

1. FC Nürnberg
2016–17 season
- Manager: Alois Schwartz / Michael Köllner
- Stadium: Stadion Nürnberg
- 2. Bundesliga: 12th
- DFB-Pokal: 2nd Round
- Top goalscorer: League: Guido Burgstaller (14); All: Guido Burgstaller (14)
- Highest home attendance: 44,089 vs Stuttgart
- Lowest home attendance: 23,152 vs Braunschweig
- Average home league attendance: 28,834
| Home colours | Away colours | Third colours |

The 2016–17 1. FC Nürnberg season is the 117th season in the club's football history.

== Review and events ==
In 2016–17 the club plays in the 2. Bundesliga.

The club also took part in the 2016–17 edition of the DFB-Pokal, the German Cup.

== Friendly matches ==
| 30 June 2016 | TSV Kornburg | 2 – 3 | 1. FC Nürnberg | Nürnberg |
| 18:00 CEST (UTC+02) | | | | Attendance: 2,500; Referee: Florian Badstübner |

| 5 July 2016 | Wacker Innsbruck | 0 – 2 | 1. FC Nürnberg | Grassau |
| 18:00 CEST (UTC+02) | | | | Attendance: 400 |

| 9 July 2016 | FC Winterthur | 1 – 5 | 1. FC Nürnberg | Feuchtwangen |
| 18:00 CEST (UTC+02) | | | | Stadium: Heinz-Seidel-Stadion; Attendance: 1,400 |

| 14 July 2016 | 1. FC Nürnberg | 2 – 0 | FSV Zwickau | Nuremberg |
| 17:30 CEST (UTC+02) | | | | Attendance: 1,000; Referee: Florian Kornblum |

| 24 July 2016 | Chemnitzer FC | 1 – 1 | 1. FC Nürnberg | Hof |
| 15:00 CEST (UTC+02) | | | | Stadium: Stadion Grüne Au; Attendance: 1,700; Referee: Deniz Aytekin |

| 29 July 2016 | 1. FC Nürnberg | 2 – 1 | FC Augsburg | Nuremberg |
| 19:00 CEST (UTC+02) | | | | Stadium: Stadion Nürnberg; Attendance: 8,434; Referee: Robert Hartmann |

| 1 September 2016 | FC Ingolstadt 04 | 1 – 2 | 1. FC Nürnberg | Kösching |
| 18:00 CEST (UTC+02) | | | | Stadium: TSV Sportplatz; Attendance: 1,500; Referee: Benjamin Cortus |

| 7 October 2016 | 1. FC Nürnberg | 1 – 2 | SSV Jahn Regensburg | Nuremberg |
| 14:00 CEST (UTC+01) | | | | Stadium: Max-Morlock-Platz; Attendance: 400; Referee: Benjamin Brand |

| 15 January 2017 | FC Ingolstadt 04 | 0 – 0 | 1. FC Nürnberg | Ingolstadt |
| 13:30 CEST (UTC+01) | | | | Stadium: AUDI Sportpark Platz 4 Attendance: 0 |

| 18 January 2017 | FC Sion | 2 – 3 | 1. FC Nürnberg | La Manga, Spain |
| 15:30 CEST (UTC+01) | | | | Attendance: 30 |

| 22 January 2017 | 1. FC Nürnberg | 3 – 1 | VfR Aalen | Nuremberg |
| 13:30 CEST (UTC+01) | | | | Stadium: Max-Morlock-Platz; Attendance: 450 |

== Competitions ==
Win Draw Loss

=== 2. Bundesliga ===
==== League table ====
| Pos | Team | Pld | W | D | L | GF | GA | GD | Pts |
|---|---|---|---|---|---|---|---|---|---|
| 10 | SV Sandhausen | 34 | 10 | 12 | 12 | 41 | 36 | +5 | 42 |
| 11 | Fortuna Düsseldorf | 34 | 10 | 12 | 12 | 37 | 39 | −2 | 42 |
| 12 | 1. FC Nürnberg | 34 | 12 | 6 | 16 | 46 | 52 | −6 | 42 |
| 13 | 1. FC Kaiserslautern | 34 | 10 | 11 | 13 | 29 | 33 | −4 | 41 |
| 14 | Erzgebirge Aue | 34 | 10 | 9 | 15 | 37 | 52 | −15 | 39 |

Source: DFB
Rules for classification: 1) Points; 2) Goal difference; 3) Goals scored

==== Matches ====
| 6 August 2016 1 | Dynamo Dresden | 1–1 | 1. FC Nürnberg | Dresden |
| 15:30 CEST (UTC+02) | Testroet 90+4' | Match Report | Burgstaller 45' (pen.) | Stadium: Stadion Dresden; Attendance: 29,453; Referee: Tobias Welz; Man of the Match: Stefaniak |

| 12 August 2016 2 | 1. FC Nürnberg | 1–1 | 1. FC Heidenheim | Nuremberg |
| 18:30 CEST (UTC+02) | Sylvestr 11' | Match Report | Thomalla 56' | Stadium: Stadion Nürnberg; Attendance: 25,769; Referee: Harm Osmers; Man of the Match: Feick |

| 28 August 2016 3 | Eintracht Braunschweig | 6–1 | 1. FC Nürnberg | Braunschweig |
| 13:30 CEST (UTC+02) | Kumbela 43'; Decarli 45+2', 55'; Bulthuis 64' (ogg.); Omladic 86'; Nyman 88' | Match Report | Burgstaller 8' | Stadium: Eintracht-Stadion; Attendance: 20,840; Referee: Felix Zwayer; Man of the Match: Decarli |

| 12 September 2016 4 | 1. FC Nürnberg | 1–2 | TSV 1860 Munich | Nuremberg |
| 20:15 CEST (UTC+02) | Matavž 17' | Match Report | Mölders 11'; Liendl 79' | Stadium: Stadion Nürnberg; Attendance: 30,635; Referee: Bastian Dankert; Man of the Match: Liendl |

| 16 September 2016 5 | VfL Bochum | 5–4 | 1. FC Nürnberg | Bochum |
| 18:30 CEST (UTC+02) | Stöger 4'; Bastians 7' (pen.); Mlapa 27', 55'; Quaschner 89' | Match Report | Salli 18', 45+3' (pen.); Bulthuis 34'; Parker 90+2' | Stadium: Ruhrstadion; Attendance: 16,050; Referee: Lasse Koslowski; Man of the Match: Mlapa |

| 20 September 2016 6 | 1. FC Nürnberg | 1–2 | SpVgg Greuther Fürth | Nuremberg |
| 18:30 CEST (UTC+02) | Burgstaller 90+3' | Match Report | Dursun 40'; Steininger 54' | Stadium: Stadion Nürnberg; Attendance: 32,363; Referee: Tobias Stieler; Man of the Match: Franke |

| 25 September 2016 7 | Arminia Bielefeld | 1–3 | 1. FC Nürnberg | Bielefeld |
| 13:30 CEST (UTC+02) | Schuppan 42' | Report | Burgstaller 52', 81'; Matavž 86' | Stadium: Bielefelder Alm; Attendance: 16,671; Referee: Markus Schmidt; Man of the Match: Burgstaller |

| 30 September 2016 8 | 1. FC Nürnberg | 2–0 | Union Berlin | Nuremberg |
| 18:30 CEST (UTC+02) | Möhwald 45'; Teuchert 83' | Report | | Stadium: Stadion Nürnberg; Attendance: 24,465; Referee: Daniel Schlager; Man of the Match: Möhwald |

| 16 October 2016 9 | Karlsruher SC | 0–3 | 1. FC Nürnberg | Karlsruhe |
| 13:30 CEST (UTC+02) | | Report | Burgstaller 61', 67'; Matavž 86' | Stadium: Wildparkstadion; Attendance: 16,065; Referee: Felix Zwayer; Man of the Match: Burgstaller |

| 23 October 2016 10 | 1. FC Nürnberg | 2–0 | Hannover 96 | Nuremberg |
| 13:30 CEST (UTC+02) | Matavž 4'; Burgstaller 21' | Report | | Stadium: Stadion Nürnberg; Attendance: 27,378; Referee: Matthias Jöllenbeck; Man of the Match: Kirschbaum |

| 31 October 2016 11 | FC St. Pauli | 1–1 | 1. FC Nürnberg | Hamburg |
| 20:15 CET (UTC+01) | Buchtmann 6' | Report | Burgstaller 20' | Stadium: Millerntor-Stadion; Attendance: 29,546 (sell-out); Referee: Harm Osmers; Man of the Match: Buchtmann |

| 4 November 2016 12 | FC Erzgebirge Aue | 1–2 | 1. FC Nürnberg | Aue |
| 18:30 CET (UTC+01) | Adler 60' | Report | Möhwald 44'; Burgstaller 77' | Stadium: Erzgebirgsstadion; Attendance: 9,000; Referee: Benedikt Kempkes; Man of the Match: Möhwald |

| 18 November 2016 13 | 1. FC Nürnberg | 2–2 | Würzburger Kickers | Nuremberg |
| 18:30 CET (UTC+01) | Burgstaller 45'; Hovland 89' | Report | Soriano 54'; Pisot 56' (pen.) | Stadium: Stadion Nürnberg; Attendance: 37,673; Referee: Timo Gerach; Man of the Match: Burgstaller |

| 28 November 2016 14 | VfB Stuttgart | 3–1 | 1. FC Nürnberg | Stuttgart |
| 20:15 CET (UTC+01) | Terodde 3', 33'; Asano 90+3' | Report | Möhwald 80' | Stadium: Mercedes-Benz Arena; Attendance: 42,000; Referee: Drees; Man of the Match: Baumgartl |

| 3 December 2016 15 | 1. FC Nürnberg | 1–3 | SV Sandhausen | Nuremberg |
| 13:00 CET (UTC+01) | Burgstaller 82' | Report | Wooten 28'; Klingmann 55'; Łukasik 76' | Stadium: Stadion Nürnberg; Attendance: 25,250; Referee: Martin Thomsen; Man of the Match: Knaller |

| 9 December 2016 16 | Fortuna Düsseldorf | 0–2 | 1. FC Nürnberg | Düsseldorf |
| 18:30 CET (UTC+01) | | Match Report | Burgstaller 6'; Matavž 66' | Stadium: Esprit Arena; Attendance: 25,739; Referee: René Rohde; Man of the Match: Burgstaller |

| 19 December 2016 17 | 1. FC Nürnberg | 2–1 | 1. FC Kaiserslautern | Nuremberg |
| 20:15 CET (UTC+01) | Behrens 51'; Burgstaller 90' | Report | Zoua 78' | Stadium: Stadion Nürnberg; Attendance: 24,406; Referee: Markus Schmidt; Man of the Match: Margreitter |

| 29 January 2017 18 | 1. FC Nürnberg | 1–2 | Dynamo Dresden | Nuremberg |
| 13:30 CET (UTC+01) | Mühl 71' | Report | Heise 31'; Berko 46' | Stadium: Stadion Nürnberg; Attendance: 35,984; Referee: Florian Heft; Man of the Match: Berko |

| 4 February 2017 19 | 1. FC Heidenheim | 2–3 | 1. FC Nürnberg | Heidenheim |
| 13:00 CET (UTC+01) | Kleindienst 41'; Verhoek 90' | Match Report | Sabiri 4', 79'; Kammerbauer 68' | Stadium: Voith-Arena; Attendance: 13,300; Referee: Arne Aarnink; Man of the Match: Sabiri |

| 10 February 2017 20 | 1. FC Nürnberg | 1–1 | Eintracht Braunschweig | Nuremberg |
| 18:30 CET (UTC+01) | Sabiri 53' | Report | Nyman 23' | Stadium: Stadion Nürnberg; Attendance: 23,152; Referee: Marco Fritz; Man of the Match: Hernandez |

| 20 February 2017 21 | TSV 1860 Munich | 2–0 | 1. FC Nürnberg | Munich |
| 20:15 CET (UTC+01) | Ba 16'; Lumor 39' | Match Report | | Stadium: Allianz Arena; Attendance: 24,100; Referee: Frank Willenborg; Man of the Match: Ba |

| 26 February 2017 22 | 1. FC Nürnberg | 0–1 | VfL Bochum | Nuremberg |
| 13:30 CET (UTC+01) | | Report | Quaschner 35' | Stadium: Stadion Nürnberg; Attendance: 25,700; Referee: Alexander Sather; Man of the Match: Riemann |

| 5 March 2017 23 | SpVgg Greuther Fürth | 1–0 | 1. FC Nürnberg | Fürth |
| 13:30 CET (UTC+01) | Zulj 77' | Match Report | | Stadium: Sportpark Ronhof; Attendance: 13,015 (sell-out); Referee: Harm Osmers; Man of the Match: Zulj |

| 12 March 2017 24 | 1. FC Nürnberg | 1–0 | Arminia Bielefeld | Nuremberg |
| 13:30 CET (UTC+01) | Petrák 35' | Report | | Stadium: Stadion Nürnberg; Attendance: 24,324; Referee: Lasse Koslowski; Man of the Match: Petrák |

| 20 March 2017 25 | 1. FC Union Berlin | 1–0 | 1. FC Nürnberg | Berlin |
| 20:15 CET (UTC+01) | Hosiner 83' | Match Report | | Stadium: Stadion An der Alten Försterei; Attendance: 21,210; Referee: Jochen Drees; Man of the Match: Hosiner |

| 31 March 2017 26 | 1. FC Nürnberg | 2–1 | Karlsruher SC | Nuremberg |
| 18:30 CEST (UTC+02) | T. Kempe 65' (pen.), 70' (pen.) | Report | Sallahi 24' | Stadium: Stadion Nürnberg; Attendance: 25,113; Referee: Martin Petersen; Man of the Match: T. Kempe |

| 4 April 2017 27 | Hannover 96 | 1–0 | 1. FC Nürnberg | Hannover |
| 17:30 CEST (UTC+02) | Harnik 47' | Match Report | | Stadium: HDI Arena; Attendance: 34,000; Referee: René Rohde; Man of the Match: Sané |

| 7 April 2017 28 | 1. FC Nürnberg | 0–2 | FC St. Pauli | Nuremberg |
| 18:30 CEST (UTC+02) | | Report | Bouhaddouz 51', 70' | Stadium: Stadion Nürnberg; Attendance: 28,889; Referee: Daniel Schlager; Man of the Match: Bouhaddouz |

| 15 April 2017 29 | 1. FC Nürnberg | 2–1 | FC Erzgebirge Aue | Nuremberg |
| 13:00 CEST (UTC+02) | T. Kempe 24'; Teuchert 82' | Report | Kvesić 51' | Stadium: Stadion Nürnberg; Attendance: 24,707; Referee: Arne Aarnink; Man of the Match: Teuchert |

| 23 April 2017 30 | Würzburger Kickers | 1–1 | 1. FC Nürnberg | Würzburg |
| 13:30 CEST (UTC+02) | Rama 10' | Match Report | Teuchert 80' | Stadium: flyeralarm Arena; Attendance: 12,450 (sell-out); Referee: Matthias Jöllenbeck; Man of the Match: Fröde |

| 29 April 2017 31 | 1. FC Nürnberg | 2–3 | VfB Stuttgart | Nuremberg |
| 13:00 CEST (UTC+02) | Behrens 25'; Teuchert 33' | Report | Terodde 47' (pen.); Ginczek 50'; Klein 90' | Stadium: Stadion Nürnberg; Attendance: 44,089; Referee: Bastian Dankert; Man of the Match: Terodde |

| 6 May 2017 32 | SV Sandhausen | 0–1 | 1. FC Nürnberg | Sandhausen |
| 13:00 CEST (UTC+02) | | Match Report | Sabiri 70' | Stadium: Hardtwaldstadion; Attendance: 8,408; Referee: Florian Heft; Man of the Match: Sabiri |

| 14 May 2017 33 | 1. FC Nürnberg | 2–3 | Fortuna Düsseldorf | Nuremberg |
| 15:30 CEST (UTC+02) | Sabiri 13'; Möhwald 75' | Report | Kiesewetter 27'; Hennings 70'; Sabiri 88' (ogg.) | Stadium: Stadion Nürnberg; Attendance: 30,279; Referee: René Rohde; Man of the Match: Bebou |

| 21 May 2017 34 | 1. FC Kaiserslautern | 1–0 | 1. FC Nürnberg | Kaiserslautern |
| 15:30 CEST (UTC+02) | Halfar 20' | Match Report | | Stadium: Fritz-Walter-Stadion; Attendance: 38,423; Referee: Markus Schmidt; Man of the Match: Halfar |

=== DFB-Pokal ===
| 20 August 2016 First round | Viktoria Köln | 1–1 (a.e.t.) (5–6 p) | 1. FC Nürnberg | Cologne |
| 15:30 CEST (UTC+02:00) | Wunderlich 80' | Report | Margreitter 76' | Stadium: Sportpark Höhenberg; Attendance: 4,787; Referee: Daniel Schlager |
| | Penalties |
| | Wunderlich (penalty scored); Nottbeck (penalty scored); Backszat (penalty scored); Koronkiewicz (penalty scored); Schwarz (penalty scored); Holzweiler (penalty missed) | | (penalty scored) Burgstaller; (penalty scored) Behrens; (penalty scored) Kempe; (penalty scored) Brečko; (penalty scored) Leibold; (penalty scored) Alushi |

| 26 October 2016 Second round | 1. FC Nürnberg | 2–3 | FC Schalke 04 | Nuremberg |
| 20:45 CEST (UTC+02) | Baba 59' (ogg.); T. Kempe 68' (pen.) | Report | Konoplyanka 20', 45'; Huntelaar 31' | Stadium: Stadion Nürnberg; Attendance: 28,281; Referee: Frank Willenborg; Man of the Match: Konoplyanka |

== Overall ==
| Matches played | 34 |
| Matches won | 12 |
| Matches drawn | 6 |
| Matches lost | 16 |
| Goals scored | 46 |
| Goals conceded | 52 |
| Goal difference | -6 |
| Clean sheets | 6 |
| Yellow cards | |
| Red cards | 3 |
| Best result(s) | 3-0 vs Karlsruhe |
| Worst result(s) | 1-6 vs Braunschweig |
| Points earned | 42/102 |
