= Eduard Löwen =

German footballer (born 1997)

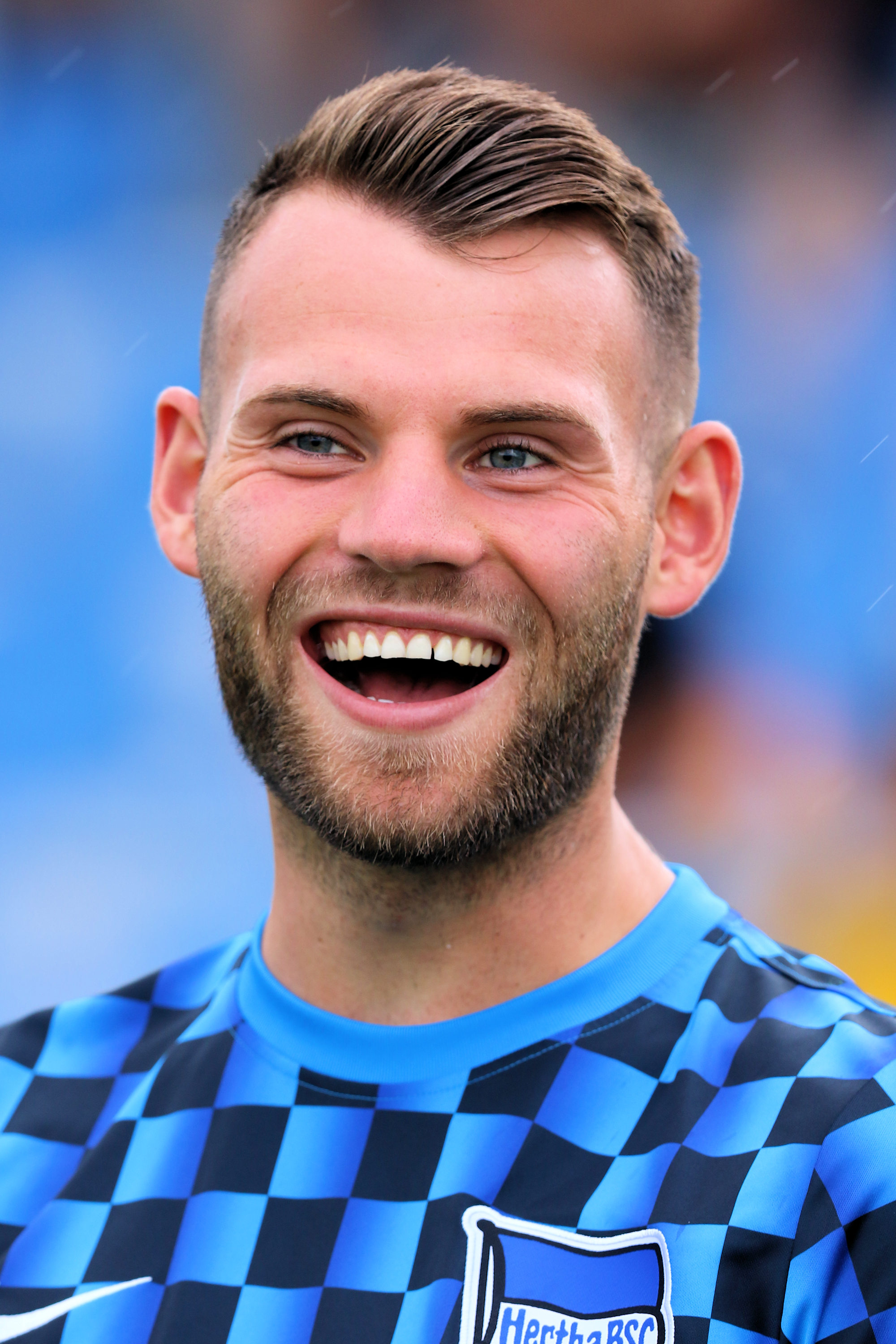
- Löwen with Hertha BSC in 2019

Personal information
- Date of birth: 28 January 1997 (age 29)
- Place of birth: Idar-Oberstein, Germany
- Height: 1.88 m (6 ft 2 in)
- Position: Midfielder

Team information
- Current team: San Jose Earthquakes
- Number: 10

Youth career
- –2008: SV Hottenbach
- 2008–2015: 1. FC Kaiserslautern
- 2015–2016: 1. FC Saarbrücken

Senior career*
Years	Team	Apps	(Gls)
2016–2017	1. FC Nürnberg II	14	(0)
2017–2019	1. FC Nürnberg	65	(8)
2019–2022	Hertha BSC	14	(0)
2019	Hertha BSC II	1	(0)
2020	→ FC Augsburg (loan)	16	(2)
2021–2022	→ VfL Bochum (loan)	26	(2)
2022	St. Louis City 2	2	(0)
2023–2026	St. Louis City SC	99	(23)
2026–	San Jose Earthquakes	7	(1)

International career
2017	Germany U20	2	(1)
2017–2019	Germany U21	7	(1)
2021	Germany Olympic	3	(1)
Medal record
UEFA European Under-21 Championship
Runner-up	2019
- * Club domestic league appearances and goals as of October 12th 2026

Eduard Löwen (German pronunciation: [ˈeːdu.aʁt ˈløːvn̩]; born 28 January 1997) is a German professional footballer who plays as a midfielder for Major League Soccer club San Jose Earthquakes.

== Club career ==
Löwen began his club career with 1. FC Nürnberg in 2016–2017, playing 14 games with the reserve squad and 11 with the primary club in 2. Bundesliga. After three seasons that included the club's promotion to Bundesliga in 2018-2019, Löwen signed with Bundesliga club Hertha BSC for 7 million Euros during the Summer 2019 transfer period. Over the ensuing three seasons, Lowen alternated between games for Hertha BSC and their reserve squad, and loans out to Bundesliga clubs FC Augsburg in 2020 and VfL Bochum in 2021-2022.

On 24 June 2022, Löwen signed a contract with MLS club St. Louis City SC, who would begin play in the 2023 season, through the 2026 season with an option for 2027. He would join the second team in 2022.

In week two of the 2023 season, Löwen was named to the league's Team of the Matchday after scoring the game-winning goal in a 3–1 victory over Charlotte FC.

Through his first season with City SC, Löwen earned praise for his creativity, versatility, and field awareness in the St. Louis midfield, frequently among the most impactful players on the pitch for City SC. Löwen missed multiple games in 2023 with a quadriceps injury, and again in 2024 with a hamstring injury. Despite those games missed, Löwen was a finalist in MLS' Newcomer of the Year voting, finishing third behind Lionel Messi and winner Giorgos Giakoumakis.

On August 26, 2026, Löwen went to San Jose Earthquakes.

== Personal life ==
Born in Germany, Löwen is of Russia German descent. Löwen was married, and he took an extended leave of absence during the 2024 MLS season to be with his wife, Ilona, as she underwent treatment for brain cancer. Löwen's wife died on 9 March 2026.

== Career statistics ==
As of end of season 2025

Appearances and goals by club, season and competition
Club	Season	League			National cup (Note: Includes DFB-Pokal, U.S. Open Cup)		Continental		Other		Total	
Club	Season	Division	Apps	Goals	Apps	Goals	Apps	Goals	Apps	Goals	Apps	Goals
1. FC Nürnberg II	2016–17	Regionalliga Bayern	14	0	—		—		—		14	0
1. FC Nürnberg	2016–17	2. Bundesliga	11	0	0	0	—		—		11	0
1. FC Nürnberg	2017–18	2. Bundesliga	32	5	3	0	—		—		35	5
1. FC Nürnberg	2018–19	Bundesliga	22	3	1	0	—		—		23	3
1. FC Nürnberg	Total		79	8	4	0	—		—		83	8
Hertha BSC	2019–20	Bundesliga	7	0	0	0	—		—		7	0
Hertha BSC	2020–21	Bundesliga	7	0	0	0	—		—		7	0
Hertha BSC	Total		14	0	0	0	—		—		14	0
Hertha BSC II	2019–20	Regionalliga Nordost	1	0	—		—		—		1	0
FC Augsburg (loan)	2019–20	Bundesliga	16	2	0	0	—		—		16	2
VfL Bochum (loan)	2021–22	Bundesliga	26	2	2	1	—		—		28	3
St. Louis City 2	2022	MLS Next Pro	2	0	—		—		—		2	0
St. Louis City SC	2023	MLS	29	6	2	1	—		4 (Note: Two appearances in Leagues Cup, two appearances in MLS Cup playoffs)	0	35	7
St. Louis City SC	2024	MLS	23	5	—		2 (Note: Appearances in CONCACAF Champions Cup)	0	4 (Note: Appearances in Leagues Cup)	1	29	6
St. Louis City SC	2025	MLS	19	6	1	0	—		—		20	6
St. Louis City SC	Total		71	17	3	1	2	0	8	1	84	19
Career total			209	29	9	2	2	0	8	1	208	32

== Honors ==
St. Louis City SC

- Western Conference (regular season): 2023
