= Jayden Reid (American soccer) =

American soccer player (born 2001)

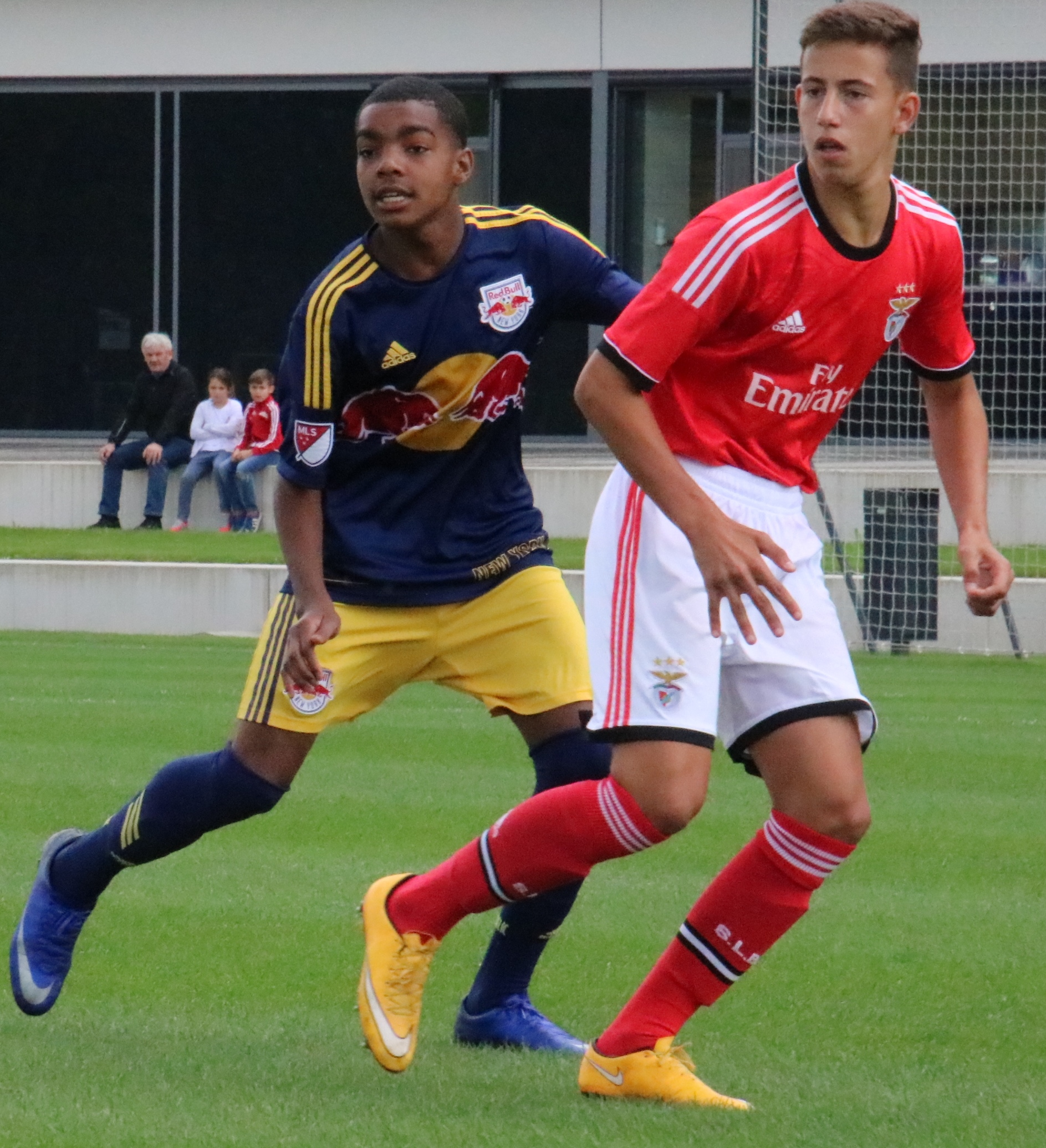
- Jayden Reid (left) playing for New York Red Bulls Academy in 2018.

Personal information
- Full name: Jayden Reid
- Date of birth: August 30, 2001 (age 25)
- Place of birth: Elmont, New York, United States
- Height: 6 ft 0 in (1.83 m)
- Position: Left-back

Team information
- Current team: Sporting Kansas City
- Number: 99

Youth career
- –2013: Jigs Soccer Academy
- 2013–2015: New York Red Bulls Academy
- 2015–2017: Blau Weiss Gottschee
- 2017–2019: New York Red Bulls Academy

College career
Years	Team	Apps	(Gls)
2019–2022	Connecticut Huskies	51	(3)

Senior career*
Years	Team	Apps	(Gls)
2021	New York Red Bulls U-23	6	(0)
2022	Long Island Rough Riders	9	(1)
2023	New York Red Bulls	1	(0)
2023	→ New York Red Bulls II (loan)	21	(0)
2024	St. Louis City 2	13	(0)
2024	→ St. Louis City SC (loan)	2	(0)
2024–2025	St. Louis City SC	19	(0)
2025	→ St. Louis City 2 (loan)	9	(0)
2026–	Sporting Kansas City	0	(0)
- * Club domestic league appearances and goals as of February 3, 2026

Jayden Reid (born August 30, 2001) is an American professional soccer player who plays as a left-back for Major League Soccer club Sporting Kansas City.

== Early life ==
Reid began playing youth soccer with Jigs Soccer Academy at age eight, before joining the New York Red Bulls Academy, where he spent five years. He later played with Blau Weiss Gottschee.

== College career ==
In 2019, Reid began attending the University of Connecticut, where he played for the UConn Huskies men's soccer team. On September 14, 2021, he scored his first collegiate goal and recorded two assists in a 4–0 victory over the Yale Bulldogs. For his senior season in 2022, he was named a team captain. Following the 2022 season, Reid was named to the All-Big East Third Team.

== Club career ==
In 2021, Reid played with the New York Red Bulls U23 team in USL League Two. In 2022, he joined the Long Island Rough Riders in USL League Two.

In December 2022, Reid signed a homegrown player contract with Major League Soccer club New York Red Bulls ahead of the 2023 season, with club options for 2024 through 2026. He spent most of the season with the second team, New York Red Bulls II in MLS Next Pro, making his professional debut on March 25, 2023, against Columbus Crew 2. Reid made his MLS debut on May 17, 2023, against Toronto FC. At the conclusion of the 2023 season, the Red Bulls declined his contract option for 2024.

In February 2024, Reid signed with St. Louis City 2 in MLS Next Pro for the 2024 season, with an option for 2025. In June and July 2024, he was signed to the St. Louis City SC first team on three short-term loan agreements. He made his first-team debut on June 22, 2024, against Atlanta United FC, playing the full 90 minutes and recording an assist. In July 2024, Reid signed a full first-team contract with St. Louis City SC for the remainder of the 2024 season, with options for 2025 and 2026. On November 25, 2025, Reid's contract option was declined.

On February 3, 2026, Reid signed a one-season contract with Sporting Kansas City with a team option for two more seasons.

== Style of play ==
Primarily deployed as a left-back, Reid is also capable of playing as a wing-back or a wide midfielder. Known for his exceptional acceleration and pace, he frequently beats defenders on overlapping runs. Reid often attempts tricks and skill moves with varying degrees of success.
