= Kevin Holzweiler =

German footballer (born 1994)

Personal information
- Date of birth: 16 October 1994 (age 32)
- Place of birth: Jülich, Germany
- Height: 1.63 m (5 ft 4 in)
- Position: Right winger

Team information
- Current team: SF Lotte
- Number: 31

Youth career
- 2002–2013: Borussia Mönchengladbach

Senior career*
| Years | Team | Apps | (Gls) |
| 2013–2016 | Borussia Mönchengladbach II | 72 | (14) |
| 2016–2021 | Viktoria Köln | 153 | (17) |
| 2021–2023 | Rot-Weiss Essen | 22 | (1) |
| 2024 | Fortuna Köln | 10 | (1) |
| 2024– | SF Lotte | 12 | (2) |

International career
| 2009 | Germany U15 | 1 | (0) |
| 2010 | Germany U16 | 1 | (0) |
| 2010–2011 | Germany U17 | 4 | (0) |
| 2011–2012 | Germany U18 | 6 | (2) |
| 2013 | Germany U19 | 5 | (0) |
- * Club domestic league appearances and goals as of 1 January 2025

Kevin Holzweiler (born 16 October 1994) is a German professional footballer who plays as a right winger for SF Lotte.

== Career ==
Holzweiler made his professional debut in the 3. Liga for Viktoria Köln on 20 July 2019, starting in the away match against Hansa Rostock. He scored the second goal for Köln, reducing the deficit to 3–2, with the match finishing as a 3–3 draw.
