= Mathias Wittek =

German footballer

Personal information
- Date of birth: 30 March 1989 (age 37)
- Place of birth: Kędzierzyn-Koźle, Poland
- Height: 1.93 m (6 ft 4 in)
- Position: Defender

Youth career
- MBB SG Augsburg
- –2004: TSV Aindling
- 2004–2007: 1860 Munich

Senior career*
Years	Team	Apps	(Gls)
2007–2010	1860 Munich II	28	(2)
2009–2010	1860 Munich	0	(0)
2010–2011	FC Ingolstadt 04	16	(0)
2011–2019	1. FC Heidenheim	182	(9)
2019–2021	Darmstadt 98	14	(2)

International career
2005–2006	Germany U17	5	(1)
2007	Germany U18	1	(0)
- * Club domestic league appearances and goals as of 21:38, 2 August 2021 (UTC)

Mathias Wittek (born Maciej Witek on 30 March 1989) is a professional footballer who most recently played as a defender for Darmstadt 98. Born in Poland, he has represented Germany at youth level.
