= Georg Margreitter =

Austrian footballer

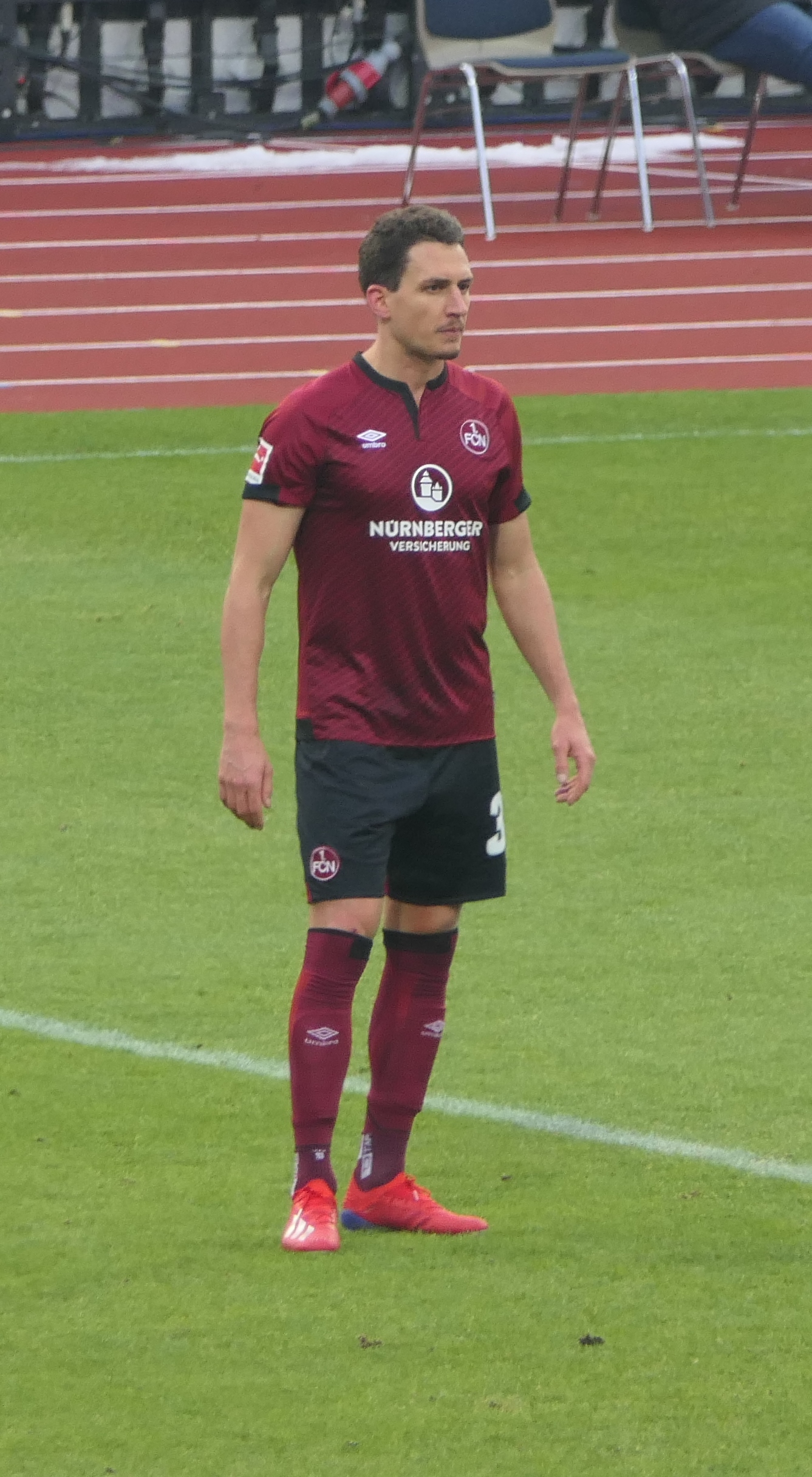
- Margreitter with 1. FC Nürnberg in 2019

Personal information
- Date of birth: 7 November 1988 (age 37)
- Place of birth: Schruns, Austria
- Height: 1.87 m (6 ft 2 in)
- Position: Defender

Youth career
- FC Schruns
- BNZ Vorarlberg

Senior career*
| Years | Team | Apps | (Gls) |
| 2007–2010 | LASK Linz | 28 | (2) |
| 2008–2009 | → Magna Wiener Neustadt (loan) | 30 | (4) |
| 2010–2012 | Austria Vienna | 59 | (2) |
| 2012–2015 | Wolverhampton Wanderers | 1 | (0) |
| 2013–2014 | → Copenhagen (loan) | 13 | (0) |
| 2014 | → Chesterfield (loan) | 13 | (1) |
| 2015–2021 | 1. FC Nürnberg | 129 | (9) |
| 2021–2023 | Grasshopper Club Zürich | 37 | (4) |

International career^{‡}
| | Austria U-19 | 6 | (0) |
| | Austria U-20 | 7 | (0) |
| | Austria U-21 | 11 | (3) |
- * Club domestic league appearances and goals as of 5 June 2023 ‡ National team caps and goals as of 7 February 2011

Georg Margreitter (born 7 November 1988) is an Austrian professional footballer who plays as a central defender.

== Career ==
Margreitter began his professional career with Austrian Bundesliga club LASK Linz in 2007, making his first team debut on 28 July 2007 against Red Bull Salzburg.

=== Early career ===
In Summer 2008 he was loaned out to the newly formed Magna Wiener Neustadt. Margreitter established himself as a regular member of their central defence as the club won the Austrian Football First League (second tier).

He returned to LASK for the 2009–10 season and was made captain. In Summer 2010 he moved to fellow top flight side Austria Vienna, where he signed a contract until 2013. Here, he played European football with the team in the UEFA Europa League.

=== Wolverhampton Wanderers ===
On 24 August 2012, Margreitter joined English side Wolverhampton Wanderers signing a four-year contract for an undisclosed fee, reported to be around £500,000. He made his club debut on 30 August 2012 in a 3–1 League Cup win at Northampton. Much of his season was however affected by injury problems, as well as the departure of Ståle Solbakken as manager, while subsequent managers did not select Margreitter. His sole league appearance for the club during the 2012–13 campaign was a ten-minute spell as a substitute in a match at Ipswich. His third and what turned out to be final appearance for the club came in a 6–0 defeat to Chelsea in the League Cup. The season saw the club relegated for a consecutive season, prompting to Margreitter to blog that there had been a "lack of hunger" among the players to win matches.

Out of the plans of new Wolves manager Kenny Jackett, Margreitter was sent on a season-long loan to Copenhagen in September 2013, where he reunited with his former Wolves manager Ståle Solbakken and played in the Champions League.

After returning to Wolves he was loaned out again, joining English League One side Chesterfield in September 2014 in a three-month deal, making 14 appearances in total, scoring once against Notts County.

On 4 August 2015, Wolves announced that Margreitter and the club had reached an agreement to cancel his contract, which had one year left to run.

=== 1. FC Nürnberg ===
On 24 August he signed a deal with German 2. Bundesliga side 1. FC Nürnberg. He quickly grew out to become an integral part of the defense. In 2018, Margreitter and Nürnberg reached promotion to the Bundesliga, after having been down in the second tier for four years. On 3 December 2018, he scored his first Bundesliga-goal in a 1–1 draw against Bayer Leverkusen.

=== Grasshopper Club Zürich ===
On 5 July 2021, Margreitter signed with Grasshopper Club Zürich for one year. He quickly established himself as the leader of Grasshopper's defence and of the team as a whole, even captaining the squad on occasion. He shot his first goal in the Super League on 21 August 2021, in a 2–1 loss against city rivals FC Zürich. His contract was extended by a further year on 20 April 2022.

In his second season, he picked up where he left off, starting in most of the games in the first half of the season. However, in the second half he had fallen out of favor in the Grasshoppers' defense and would not start again until the end of the season. On 25 May 2023, it was announced that he would depart the club at the end of the season, following the expiration of his contract.
