= All-time St. Louis City SC roster =

St. Louis City SC is an American soccer club founded in 2019, after the city of St. Louis was awarded a Major League Soccer (MLS) franchise. St. Louis City SC began playing competitive soccer in the 2023 season. It plays its home games at CityPark, competing in the Western Conference of MLS.

== Players ==
All statistics are for MLS regular season games only and are correct through the 2023 season.

Key

DF = Defender

MF = Midfielder

FW = Forward/striker

=== Outfield players ===
Name	Position	Country	Years	Games	Goals	Assists	Notes
Samuel Adeniran	FW	USA	2023–	18	8	1	
Rasmus Alm	MF	Sweden	2023–	21	3	4	
Lucas Bartlett	DF	USA	2023	14	0	1	
Jon Bell	DF	Jamaica	2023	3	0	0	
Njabulo Blom	MF	South Africa	2023–	26	1	1	
Nicholas Gioacchini	FW	USA	2023–	32	10	1	
Caden Glover	FW	USA	2023–	1	0	0	
Kyle Hiebert	DF	Canada	2023–	27	2	1	
Aziel Jackson	MF	USA	2023–	25	1	4	
Isak Jensen	MF	Denmark	2023–	11	0	0	
João Klauss	FW	Brazil	2023–	19	10	4	
John Klein	MF	USA	2023–	2	0	0	
Eduard Löwen	MF	Germany	2023–	29	6	14	
Anthony Markanich	DF	USA	2023–	10	1	0	
John Nelson	DF	USA	2023	17	0	1	
Jake Nerwinski	DF	USA	2023–	29	0	2	
Joakim Nilsson	DF	Sweden	2023–	8	0	0	
Tomáš Ostrák	MF	Czech Republic	2023–	30	3	2	
Tim Parker	DF	USA	2023–	29	4	0	
Miguel Perez	MF	USA	2023–	15	1	0	
Selmir Pidro	DF	Bosnia and Herzegovina	2023–	2	0	0	
Célio Pompeu	MF	Brazil	2023–	26	1	2	
Jared Stroud	MF	USA	2023	31	5	5	
Nökkvi Thórisson	FW	Iceland	2023–	9	1	0	
Indiana Vassilev	MF	USA	2023–	34	2	5	
Akil Watts	MF	USA	2023–	18	0	1	
Joshua Yaro	DF	Ghana	2023–	16	0	0	

=== Goalkeepers ===
Name	Country	Years	Games	Conceded	Shutouts	Notes
Roman Bürki	Switzerland	2023–	33	42	8	
Ben Lundt	Germany	2023–	1	3	0	

== By nationality ==
MLS regulations permit teams to name eight players from outside of the United States in their rosters. However, this limit can be exceeded by trading international slots with another MLS team, or if one or more of the overseas players is a refugee or has permanent residency rights in the USA.

Country	Number of players	Games
Bosnia and Herzegovina	1	2
Brazil	2	45
Canada	1	27
Czech Republic	1	30
Denmark	1	11
Germany	2	30
Ghana	1	16
Iceland	1	9
Jamaica	1	3
South Africa	1	26
Sweden	2	29
Switzerland	1	33
USA	14	275
