= 2023 St. Louis City SC season =

St. Louis City 2023 soccer season

St. Louis City SC
2023 season
- Sporting director: Lutz Pfannenstiel
- Head coach: Bradley Carnell
- Stadium: CityPark
- MLS: Conference: 1st Overall: 4th
- MLS Cup playoffs: Round one
- U.S. Open Cup: Round of 32
- Leagues Cup: Group stage
- Top goalscorer: League: Nicholas Gioacchini; João Klauss (10 each); All: Nicholas Gioacchini; João Klauss (10 each)
- Highest home attendance: 22,423
- Lowest home attendance: 22,423
- Average home league attendance: 22,423
- Biggest win: STL 5–1 CIN (Apr. 15, MLS); STL 5–1 OMA (Apr. 25, Open Cup)
- Biggest defeat: STL 0–4 AMÉ (July 27, Leagues Cup)
Home colors	Away colors

The 2023 season was the inaugural season for St. Louis City SC. It was the club's first season in existence, their first in the top-tier of American soccer, and their first season in Major League Soccer.

During the regular season, City SC became the first expansion team to win its conference, finishing first in the Western Conference, and earned the most wins; the team fell short of the all-time points record for an expansion team set by Los Angeles FC in 2018. Head coach Bradley Carnell used 32 different starting lineups during the regular season's 34 matches.

2023 was the first year since 1977 that a top division club from Greater St. Louis played in the first tier of U.S. soccer, the last being the St. Louis Stars who played in the North American Soccer League from 1968 until 1977, and the old National Professional Soccer League in 1967.

Outside of MLS play, St. Louis City SC also participated in the U.S. Open Cup and the Leagues Cup.

== Drafts ==
=== Expansion Draft ===
CITY were allowed to select 5 players from a list of 23 teams as part of building out their inaugural roster in the 2022 MLS Expansion Draft.

Name	Age	Selected from	Status
(United States) Niko Gioachinni	21	Orlando City SC	Signed
(United States) Indiana Vassilev	21	Inter Miami CF	Signed
(United States) Jon Bell	25	New England Revolution	Signed
(United States) John Nelson	24	FC Cincinnati	Signed
(United States) Jake LaCava	21	New York Red Bulls	Traded (Inter Miami CF)

== Summary ==
=== February and March ===
St. Louis City SC opened their inaugural MLS season on the road Feb 25 at Austin FC. Tim Parker opened up the scoring by heading home the first goal in franchise history, coming off a corner kick in the 24th minute. After going down 2–1, St. Louis City SC got second-half goals from Jared Stroud (78’) and João Klauss (86’) to come from behind and earn their first win as a franchise, 3–2. St. Louis City SC midfielder Indiana Vassilev suffered a broken nose in the 17th minute.

The following week, Mar 4, Charlotte FC came to town to open CityPark for the first home game in franchise history. Enzo Copetti scored the first goal in CityPark history (25’) to give Charlotte a 1–0 lead, but a Bill Tuiloma own goal (41’) and an Eduard Löwen PK (45+5’) gave St. Louis City SC a 2–1 lead heading into halftime. João Klauss (71’) closed out the scoring to give St. Louis City SC a 3–1 win, their first home win as a franchise. With the win, St. Louis City SC became just the fourth expansion team to start their existence 2–0. Indiana Vassilev returned while wearing a mask in the 73rd minute.

revise this kind of wording, the tone is unbalanced

"St. Louis City SC's second away game came March 11 at Portland Timbers. A quick Timbers goal to start the game put St. Louis City SC behind 1–0, but Jared Stroud tied it up in first half stoppage time (45+1’). What looked like a road draw in an away environment turned into St. Louis City SC's 3rd win out of 3 when Kyle Hiebert headed in (75’) an Eduard Löwen free kick to put St. Louis City SC ahead 2–1. This was not only their 3rd come-from-behind win, but also tied the 2009 Seattle Sounders for most wins by an expansion franchise to start a season (3–0–0).[1]"

San Jose Earthquakes came to CityPark March 18 for Matchday 4. Goals from Niko Gioacchini (34’), João Klauss (45+3) and Tomáš Ostrák (68’) led to a 3–0 win — St. Louis City SC's 4th straight, and first Clean Sheet in franchise history. The win set a new record for an expansion franchise start at 4–0–0.

A trip to Real Salt Lake on March 25 finished out the month of March. St. Louis City SC were in good form coming off the 3–0 win the previous week. After a 0–0 first half, Niko got the scoring started in the 47th minute, followed by 2 goals from Klauss (61’, 66’) and a finisher from Rasmus Alm (76’) to cap a 4–0 win. It was Roman Bürki's second Clean Sheet of the season and St. Louis City SC's 5th straight win, further extending the new record for most wins by an expansion franchise to start a season at 5–0–0.

=== April ===
Coming home for April Fools' Day, St. Louis City SC had the tough task of breaking apart Minnesota United's low block system. The game was 0–0 late and was inching towards St. Louis City SC's first draw on the year. However, a foul in the box by Kyle Hiebert in the 76th minute led to a penalty kick, which was converted to give Minnesota a 1–0 lead. Despite a flurry of an attack at the end of the game and a great chance on goal by Sam Adeniran, Minnesota held on to give St. Louis City SC their first loss on the season. Of note, Njabulo Blom joined the team for the first time since Match 2 against Charlotte FC, coming on as a sub in the 60th minute. He had missed the previous 3 games due to COVID.

What many penciled in as St. Louis City SC's first true test of the season came on Matchday 7 at Seattle Sounders FC the following week, Apr 8. For the first half, St. Louis City SC were up to the task, taking a 0–0 game into the locker room. But just after the hour mark Josh Atencio scored a screamer to put the Sounders ahead 1–0. From there, momentum and strategy shifted. St. Louis City SC were on the back foot and conceded a second goal at 71’. With the game in hand Seattle capped off a 3–0 win with help from a Jake Nerwinski own goal (another St. Louis City SC first) at 89’. Of note, Njabulo Blom came off in the 64th minute with a groin injury and would miss 5–6 weeks.

Following two straight losses, St. Louis City SC had another tough task welcoming FC Cincinnati to CityPark on Apr 15. At the time, both teams had led the Supporters Shield race at one point in the season with St. Louis City SC carrying a 5–2–0 record, while Cincy came in undefeated at 5–0–2. Just prior to the game a line of thunderstorms ripped through the St. Louis area setting off tornado sirens downtown at CityPark. The game was delayed for hours while fans took shelter in nearby bars and Union Station. By 10 pm local time, the storms had passed and the field was ready for playing. St. Louis City SC did not waste any more time to get on the scoresheet, with Jared Stroud's 3rd goal of the year coming in just the 3rd minute of play. St. Louis City SC added two more goals in the first half from Löwen (39’) and Hiebert (45+2’) to lead 3–0. The second half was much the same. A quick goal by Niko at 53’ and an own goal on GK Roman Celentano (57’; shot by Rasmus Alm) put St. Louis City SC up 5-0 inside an hour. Cincy did respond five minutes later with a goal by Sergio Santos at 62’, but that ended the scoring on the night with a 5–1 St. Louis City SC win and a move back into 1st place in the Shield race.

Matchday 9 on Apr 22 at Colorado Rapids wasn't going to be an easy task and St. Louis City SC wouldn't come away unscathed. After a quiet, 0–0 first half Rasmus Alm gave St. Louis City SC the lead in the 57th minute. Not long after, in the 61st minute, João Klauss went down away from play rubbing his quad and was subbed off due to injury. Colorado made wholesale changes at 70’ to change the dynamic of the game. Roman Bürki was truly tested for the rest of the half. One of those Colorado subs, Michael Barrios, got the equalizer in stoppage time to give St. Louis City SC their first draw in franchise history. Klauss, initially thought to be out 10–14 days, would end up missing 17 weeks and 14 games due to the injury.

While St. Louis has a long and storied history with the U.S. Open Cup, going back over 100 years, St. Louis City SC's first game in the tournament came on Tuesday, Apr 25 at CityPark – a matchup against Union Omaha of USL League One. A sold-out crowd of 22,423 would not only set an attendance record for a U.S. Open Cup Third Round match, but also see St. Louis City SC cruise to a 5–1 win on the backs of Aziel Jackson (3’, 66’), Akil Watts (62’), Löwen (86’) and an Omaha own goal (48’). Prior to the game, St. Louis City SC loaned out Sam Adeniran to San Antonio FC of USL Championship.

St. Louis City SC were back in MLS action the following Saturday, Apr 29, welcoming Portland Timbers to CityPark. It was the second matchup of the season between the two teams, with St. Louis City SC winning 2–1 in Portland on Matchday 3. The teams went into halftime at 0–0 and it was looking like neither wanted the win. But with the weather turning cold and rainy, a foul in the box gave Evander a PK at 63’ to put Portland up 1–0. Célio Pompeu would give St. Louis City SC hope, equalizing at 81’, but Portland immediately answered at 82’ to take the lead and the game 2–1.

=== May ===
By May the MLS Scheduling Gods introduced themselves to the new boys of the league. On May 6, St. Louis City SC visited Frisco, TX for their first matchup against FC Dallas. The first half ended at 0–0. But coming back from halftime the weather was about to turn sour. Five minutes into the second half, with thunderstorms near, the referee stopped play and sent both teams back to their locker rooms. Play never resumed, but rather than restart the next day, it was determined the game would be postponed until a later date. It ended up being rescheduled for Wednesday, June 7 and play would resume at the 50’ mark. Furthermore, the same starters and subs for both teams must be on the field exactly as they were when play was halted.

After traveling to Texas to play half of a game, St. Louis City SC's next match was Tuesday, May 9 at Chicago Fire for their Round 32 matchup in the U.S. Open Cup. Chicago kicked things off early with a goal at 3’ by Maren Haile-Selassie. From there they cruised, never really being challenged in St. Louis City SC's worst game of the season to date. A goal by Fabian Herbers at 75’ put Chicago up 2–0. A stoppage time goal by Miggy Perez (90+3’) made the scoreline seem much closer than the game actually was. St. Louis City SC were officially out of U.S. Open Cup.

Four days later, St. Louis City SC again traveled to Chicago. This time for MLS Matchday 11 on May 13. Njabulo Blom was back from his injury woes, but Tim Parker served a 1-game suspension due to yellow card accumulation. The game was closer than May 9, but the result was the same – a 1–0 Chicago win on the back of a Rafael Czichos goal in the 40th minute. Of note in this game, St. Louis City SC defender Johnny Nelson picked up the franchise's first red card in the 70th minute after receiving his second yellow card of the game. 16-year-old Caden Glover made his debut appearance in the 77th minute.

On May 20, St. Louis City SC returned home from that away-double against a potential rival only to welcome another potential rival, Sporting KC, to CityPark for the first time. With goals from Löwen (19’), Indiana Vassilev (25’, 75’) and Niko (55’), St. Louis City SC secured a 4–0 win and Bürki's 3rd Clean Sheet of the season.

Vancouver Whitecaps FC came into CityPark the following week, May 27. St. Louis City SC took a 1–0 lead at 10’ on a Löwen free kick from about 35 yards out that subsequently won Goal of the Matchday. A Vancouver own goal in the 45th minute and a stoppage time goal by Miggy Perez (90+4’) sealed the 3–1 win.

St. Louis City SC's first MLS midweek game was due to be played May 31 at LAFC. However, due to LAFC's advancement to the CONCACAF Champions League Final, the first leg of that Final was scheduled to be played May 31. As a result, the MLS matchup between LAFC and St. Louis City SC was rescheduled for July 12.

=== June ===
Houston Dynamo visited CityPark for the first time Jun 3. St. Louis City SC started the game off quick with a goal by Löwen in the 9th minute, then followed with goals by Ostrák (51’) and Niko (83’) leading to a 3–0 win. The shutout was Bürki's 4th Clean Sheet of the season.

St. Louis City SC next headed back to Dallas Jun 7 for the restart of the postponed game from May 6. It resumed with the score 0–0 and 40 minutes left to play. Much of the half was uneventful, but in the 80th minute Jesus Ferreira struck to put Dallas up 1–0. Not long after, Marco Farfan joined him to make it 2–0 and sealed Dallas's long-waited result over St. Louis City SC.

Looking to turn the page, St. Louis City SC welcomed 13th place LA Galaxy to CityPark on Jun 11. The teams played to a 1–1 draw with Niko scoring first in the 68th minute. But St. Louis City SC were not able make it stand up, allowing the equalizer in the 85th.

Eduard Löwen developed a quad injury in training leading up to the game at Nashville SC June 17 causing him to miss the game and sit out until Aug 20. The game didn't provide much better news. Hany Mukhtar put Nashville ahead in the 11th minute, but Niko (41’) was able to equalize right before half to give St. Louis City SC hope. However Kyle Hiebert earned a red card due to his second yellow of the game in the 68th minute. Down to 10 men, St. Louis City SC tried to hold the draw as best they could. But two more goals by Hany Mukhtar (70’, 75’) put the game away and gave Nashville the 3–1 win.

Amidst their toughest stretch of games of the season St. Louis City SC came back home to welcome Real Salt Lake to CityPark on Jun 21. The two teams had played earlier in the season with St. Louis City SC grabbing a 4–0 win. Coming into the game, RSL were the best away team in the league and they showed why. After falling behind 1–0, Niko equalized in the 21st minute. But RSL quickly went back on top soon after coming out of halftime. In the 66th minute RSL scored their third goal to leave town with a 3–1 win.

Playing their 6th game in 21 days, St. Louis City SC went to San Jose on Jun 24 to play the Earthquakes in a rematch from earlier in the season. Sam Adeniran was called back from loan in San Antonio and placed in the lineup as a starter. The move paid off as Adeniran scored a brace (41’, 58’) to take the double from San Jose on the season, winning 2–1.

=== July ===
Colorado Rapids came to town on Jul 1 with St. Louis City SC looking for revenge for the late draw in April. It did not take long to strike. Goals by Parker (4’) and Stroud (11’) were enough to secure a 2–0 win and Bürki's 5th Clean Sheet.

St. Louis City SC's first visit to Canada came on Jul 8 against Toronto FC. Looking to make it 3 wins in 3, it took until the 50th minute before Aziel Jackson slid home his first-ever MLS goal to give St. Louis City SC a 1–0 lead. It was enough to claim all 3 points on the day and give Bürki his 6th Clean Sheet.

In the rescheduled game against LAFC (May 31), St. Louis City SC travelled to LA Jul 12 for a midweek matchup that many were anticipating. For 70 minutes it did not disappoint. But a similar late-game letdown at Seattle (Matchday 7) unfolded with LAFC getting goals at 72’, 82’ and 90+2’ amounting to a 3–0 win. In the 69th minute Eduard Löwen returned from a quad injury he developed prior to the matchup against Nashville (Jun 17), missing 5 total games.

The final game before the All-Star/Leagues Cup break, St. Louis City SC welcomed Inter Miami CF to CityPark on Jul 15. It would also be Miami's last game prior to Lionel Messi's first appearance. St. Louis City SC won the match 3–0 on the strength of goals by Adeniran (28’), Parker (40’) and Löwen (80’). Bürki logged his 7th Clean Sheet of the season.

=== MLS All-Star Game ===
St. Louis City SC had two players named to the MLS All-Star team: goalie Roman Bürki and defender Tim Parker. For both, it was their first selection. The game was played at Audi Field (home of D.C. United) on July 19 against Arsenal FC. Bürki started the game in goal and played 34 minutes, being subbed out for Tyler Miller. Parker played 45 minutes, coming on at half time for Walker Zimmerman and seeing the game out.

Bürki also participated in the All-Star Skills Challenge, serving as goalie in the Cross & Volley Challenge.

=== Leagues Cup ===
The MLS seeding for Leagues Cup was determined by every team's final position for the 2022 season. Since St. Louis City SC did not field an MLS team in 2022 they were considered 29th of 29 MLS teams and seeded as such. This, despite coming into Leagues Cup sitting in 1st place in the Western Conference and 3rd place in the overall Shield race, meant that St. Louis City SC were placed in an unfavorable group with Columbus Crew and Club América. (The Crew would go on to win MLS Cup 2023 in the fall; América would go on to win the 2023 Liga MX Apertura.)

Originally set to kick off at 7:30 pm local time, Jul 23, St. Louis City SC's first visit to Columbus was beset by weather and delayed for nearly four hours. When play finally did start, St. Louis City SC found themselves down quickly. A Lucas Zelarayán free kick (11’) and a Cucho Hernández PK (29’) was all Columbus would need to control the game. A late own goal by Columbus made things interesting, but they secured the 3 points by holding on to a 2–1 win.

St. Louis City SC then welcomed Club América to CityPark Jul 27, but due to the quirks of Leagues Cup, they did so as an away team playing in their home stadium. Furthermore, despite the game starting after 9 pm local time to accommodate Mexico City, temps were hovering at 100 °F. América got down to business early with Henry Martín scoring in the 5th minute and América controlling the game thereafter. They would add 3 goals in the second half in yet another game of two halves by St. Louis City SC. The 4–0 loss eliminated St. Louis City SC from Leagues Cup and meant they would be sitting idle for more than three weeks while the rest of the tournament played out.

=== August ===
During the summer transfer window, St. Louis City SC added two players: forward Nökkvi Thórisson from Beerschot VA in Belgium and defender Anthony Markanich from the Colorado Rapids.

The MLS season picked back up Aug 20 and Austin FC came to town for what would be another steamy night in St. Louis. With temps pushing 100 °F at game time, Tim Parker got St. Louis City SC on the board in the 22nd minute. Niko added a second goal before halftime (45+2’) and a third just after (50’). Austin would try to climb back into the game with a Sebastián Driussi PK (61’), but from there the two teams would trade goals. Sam Adeniran (72’, 90+5’) and Tomáš Ostrák (88’) kept Austin at arms length to seal a 6–3 win. The 6 goals in a single game would be the most St. Louis City SC would score all season across all competitions. The game marked the long-awaited debut of Joakim Nilsson who came on in the 87th minute.

The long-awaited return of Klauss came Aug 26 at Orlando City SC. A steady first half by both teams left the game scoreless, but St. Louis City SC found themselves down 1–0 within moments of starting the second half. A number of subs for St. Louis City SC after the 70th minute would be key in getting an equalizer from Alm (79’). The goal was St. Louis City SC's 50th on the season in just 25 games – the fastest expansion team to accomplish the feat. However just ten minutes later St. Louis City SC would again find themselves in the unfortunate position of giving up a handball in the box and a resulting PK. That stoppage time goal would seal Orlando's win over St. Louis City SC.

In their third meeting in two games, FC Dallas came to St. Louis on Aug 30 for a midweek matchup. A 12th minute red card on Dallas GK Maarten Paes saw St. Louis City SC up a man for much of the game. Yet it wasn't until after the 80th minute that they got on the board. Anthony Markanich scored his first St. Louis City SC goal in the 82nd minute, quickly followed by Nökkvi Thórisson's first St. Louis City SC goal in the 85th. Dallas would claw back a stoppage time goal, but St. Louis City SC took the win 2–1 to split the season's meetings.

=== September ===
St. Louis City SC's first-ever visit to Sporting KC came in a Labor Day weekend matchup Sep 2. Sam Adeniran got scoring started in the 22nd minute to put St. Louis City SC up 1–0, but two goals by Alan Pulido sent SKC into half with a 2–1 lead. That score would stand, but not without controversy. A second half equalizer by Adeniran was called back for being offside, however it was not reviewed by either VAR or the referee. Replays suggest he was indeed onside and the goal should have stood. Later, an apparent SKC handball in the box was missed and not reviewed.

Coming off that tight game, St. Louis City SC traveled to the west coast for a Sep 10 matchup against LA Galaxy. In what was probably the best half of soccer all season, St. Louis City SC jumped out to a 2–0 lead on goals by Sam Adeniran (4’) and Klauss (28’). Things unraveled in the second half, however. In a string of bad luck, Sam Adeniran was given a yellow card for a handball in the box and LA converted the resulting PK. Less than ten minutes later, Adeniran again was called for a yellow and sent off. St. Louis City SC, now playing down a man tried to hold on, but conceded the equalizer late and left LA with a 2–2 draw.

A third straight road game, a tough match at Houston Dynamo on Sep 16, followed. Houston took a 1–0 lead into halftime and seemed capable of holding that scoreline for the entire game. Yet a late goal by Klauss (88’) would prove to secure a second consecutive road draw at 1–1.

Coming back to CityPark for a midweek matchup Sep 20 against LAFC, St. Louis City SC had a chance to secure a playoff spot with a win. However, both teams played tight to a 0–0 draw. It was Roman Bürki's 8th clean sheet of the season. Following the game, results elsewhere around the league came together to indeed secure St. Louis City SC's playoff berth — the sixth expansion team to do so.

A quick turnaround saw St. Louis City SC back on the road Sep 23 for a Matchday 31 revenge game at Minnesota United FC. In a downpour from start to finish, Minnesota took a 1–0 lead on a PK given up by Bürki moments into the second half. However, shortly after coming on as a sub in the 58th minute, Klauss equalized with a header in the 64th. Less than ten minutes later, Njabulo Blom (73’) would give St. Louis City SC the lead and the win with his first goal of the season (and which would win Goal of the Matchday).

In a month bookended by matches with Sporting KC, September was capped off with a Sep 30 meeting between the two for the second time at CityPark, and third time on the season. A tight game for much of the match was broken open quickly with a Sam Adeniran goal in the 73rd minute. The floodgates then burst with three more goals: one by Jared Stroud (75’) and two by Klauss (79’ and 85’). With the game in hand, St. Louis City SC looked to close out another 4–0 win over Kansas at CityPark. However, a goal at the death made it 4–1 and denied Bürki a 9th Clean Sheet on the season. The win would be St. Louis City SC's 17th on the season, most ever by an expansion team. It also gave them 56 points, good for second-most ever by an expansion team (2018 LAFC 57pts). Furthermore, with LAFC's loss to Real Salt Lake the next day, St. Louis City SC clinched the #1 seed in the Western Conference — the first expansion team ever to accomplish the feat.

=== October ===
Undefeated in five games for the second time on the season, St. Louis City SC headed to Vancouver Whitecaps FC Oct 4 to try to stretch it to six. However, having secured their season accolades, St. Louis City SC seemed to take their foot off the gas and played all game on the back heel. The first half ended 0–0 despite two disallowed Vancouver goals. But Vancouver came out in the second half with purpose and took the game 3–0. St. Louis City SC were never the same after.

Two and half weeks later, the Seattle Sounders FC came into CityPark for Decision Day (the final day of the regular season) Oct 21. However, the malaise from Vancouver earlier in the month carried over. Seattle went up 1–0 in the 23rd minute and then benefitted from a Tim Parker own goal in the 38th. They would hold on to win the game 2–0, thwarting St. Louis City SC's chance to tie or overtake LAFC's 57 points in their inaugural 2018 season.

=== MLS Cup ===
The 2023 version of MLS Cup initiated a new structure which saw a total of 9 teams from each conference qualify. The Nos. 8 and 9 teams in each conference played each other in a play-in game, with the winner going on to play the #1 seed in the First Round. That First Round was a best-of-3 matchup, with games 1 and 3 at the higher seed and game 2 at the lower seed. As the #1 seed, St. Louis City SC would play Sporting KC as their First Round opponent.

St. Louis City SC's first-ever playoff appearance came Oct 30 against Sporting KC on a cold and rainy night in St. Louis. It was already their 4th matchup in the rivalry's short existence. At first it seemed these two would play a tight game. SKC went up 1–0 in the 27th minute, but St. Louis City SC responded a minute later with Tim Parker scoring St. Louis City SC's first playoff goal in franchise history (28') off a corner kick. Unfortunately though, St. Louis City SC's late-season funk came right back to haunt them. Two more first-half goals followed for SKC as they took control of the game into halftime. SKC added a 4th goal in the 61st minute and won Game 1 by a score of 4–1.

=== November ===
In their 5th matchup of the season, St. Louis City SC traveled west to Kansas for Game 2 of Round 1 of MLS Cup. Much of the first half was tight and looked to be going into halftime tied. However SKC scored in stoppage time to make it 1–0. A 73rd-minute goal gave SKC a lead it wouldn't relinquish, despite a Célio Pompeu goal in the 86th and a flurry of offense for 12 minutes of stoppage time. SKC ended St. Louis City SC's season with a 2–1 loss, its fourth straight.

== Club ==
=== Management ===
Position	Name
OWNERSHIP
Chairman & Majority Owner	(United States) Carloyn Kindle
Co-Owner	(United States) Jo Ann Taylor Kindle
Co-Owner	(United States) Jim Kavanaugh
FRONT OFFICE
President & General Manager	(Argentina) Diego Gigliani
Sporting Director	(Germany) Lutz Pfannenstiel
COACHING STAFF
Head Coach	(South Africa) Bradley Carnell
Assistant Coach	(United States) John Hackworth
Assistant Coach	(United States) John Miglarese
Assistant Coach	(Bosnia and Herzegovina) Elvir Kafedžić
Goalkeeper Coach	(Germany) Alex Langer
Director of Sports Performance	(United States) Jarryd Phillips
Head of Sports Science	(United States) Kelly Roderick

=== Inaugural Roster ===
As of August 30, 2023

Note: Flags indicate national team as defined under FIFA eligibility rules; some limited exceptions apply. Players may hold more than one non-FIFA nationality.

No.	Pos.	Nation	Player
1	GK	SUI	Roman Bürki
2	DF	USA	Jake Nerwinski
4	DF	SWE	Joakim Nilsson
6	MF	RSA	Njabulo Blom
7	MF	CZE	Tomáš Ostrák
8	MF	USA	Jared Stroud
9	FW	BRA	João Klauss
10	MF	GER	Eduard Löwen
11	FW	USA	Nicholas Gioacchini
12	MF	BRA	Célio Pompeu
14	DF	USA	John Nelson
15	DF	GHA	Joshua Yaro
16	FW	USA	Samuel Adeniran
17	DF	BIH	Selmir Pidro
18	MF	USA	Owen O'Malley
19	FW	USA	Indiana Vassilev

No.	Pos.	Nation	Player
20	MF	USA	Akil Watts
21	MF	SWE	Rasmus Alm
22	DF	CAN	Kyle Hiebert
23	DF	USA	Jon Bell
24	DF	USA	Lucas Bartlett
25	MF	USA	Aziel Jackson
26	DF	USA	Tim Parker
28	MF	USA	Miguel Perez
29	FW	ISL	Nökkvi Thórisson
30	MF	DEN	Isak Jensen
31	GK	USA	Michael Creek
39	GK	GER	Ben Lundt
41	MF	USA	John Klein
44	MF	GER	Max Schneider
46	FW	USA	Caden Glover

== Competitions ==
=== Major League Soccer ===
==== Standings ====
===== Western Conference =====
MLS Western Conference table (2023)
Pos	Team	Pld	W	L	T	GF	GA	GD	Pts	Qualification
1	St. Louis City SC	34	17	12	5	62	45	+17	56	Qualification for round one and the CONCACAF Champions Cup round one
2	Seattle Sounders FC	34	14	9	11	41	32	+9	53	Qualification for round one
3	Los Angeles FC	34	14	10	10	54	39	+15	52	Qualification for round one
4	Houston Dynamo FC	34	14	11	9	51	38	+13	51	Qualification for round one
5	Real Salt Lake	34	14	12	8	48	50	−2	50	Qualification for round one

Source: MLS
Rules for classification: 1) points; 2) total wins; 3) total goal differential; 4) total goals scored; 5) fewer disciplinary points; 6) away goal differential; 7) away goals scored; 8) home goals differential; 9) home goals scored; 10) coin toss (2 clubs tied) or drawing of lots (≥3 clubs tied)

===== Overall =====
Overall MLS standings table
Pos	Team	Pld	W	L	T	GF	GA	GD	Pts	Qualification
2	Orlando City SC	34	18	7	9	55	39	+16	63	Qualification for the CONCACAF Champions Cup round one (Note: As highest-ranked club in 2023 MLS Supporters' Shield not already qualified)
3	Columbus Crew (C)	34	16	9	9	67	46	+21	57	Qualification for the CONCACAF Champions Cup round of 16 (Note: As MLS Cup 2023 champions)
4	St. Louis City SC	34	17	12	5	62	45	+17	56	Qualification for the CONCACAF Champions Cup round one (Note: As 2023 Western Conference regular season champions)
5	Philadelphia Union	34	15	9	10	57	41	+16	55	Qualification for the CONCACAF Champions Cup round one (Note: As 2023 Leagues Cup third place)
6	New England Revolution	34	15	9	10	58	46	+12	55	Qualification for the CONCACAF Champions Cup round one (Note: As second highest-ranked club in 2023 MLS Supporters' Shield not already qualified)

Source: MLS
Rules for classification: 1) points; 2) total wins; 3) total goal differential; 4) total goals scored; 5) fewer disciplinary points; 6) away goal differential; 7) away goals scored; 8) home goals differential; 9) home goals scored; 10) coin toss (2 clubs tied) or drawing of lots (≥3 clubs tied)
(C) MLS Cup champion

==== Results summary ====
Overall								Home						Away					
Pld	W	D	L	GF	GA	GD	Pts	W	D	L	GF	GA	GD	W	D	L	GF	GA	GD
34	17	5	12	62	45	+17	56	11	2	4	41	17	+24	6	3	8	21	28	−7

Last updated: October 27, 2023.
Source: MLS, FBref

==== Results by season splits ====
First Third								Middle Third								Final Third							
Pld	W	D	L	GF	GA	GD	Pts	Pld	W	D	L	GF	GA	GD	Pts	Pld	W	D	L	GF	GA	GD	Pts
11	6	1	3	22	13	+9	19	12	7	1	3	21	14	+7	22	11	4	3	4	19	18	+1	15

Source: MLS

==== Results by match ====
Match	1	2	3	4	5	6	7	8	9	10	11	12	13	14	15	16	17	18	19	20	21	22	23	24	25	26	27	28	29	30	31	32	33	34
Ground	@	H	@	H	@	H	@	H	@	H	@	H	H	H	@	H	@	H	@	H	@	@	H	H	@	H	@	@	@	H	@	H	@	H
Result	W	W	W	W	W	L	L	W	D	L	L	W	W	W	L	D	L	L	W	W	W	L	W	W	L	W	L	D	D	D	W	W	L	L
West	2	3	1	1	1	1	3	1	1	3	3	3	2	1	1	1	2	2	1	1	1	1	1	1	1	1	1	1	1	1	1	1	1	1
Shield	5	5	1	1	1	1	5	1	3	5	5	5	3	2	2	4	6	6	5	3	2	3	3	2	3	2	3	3	3	4	3	3	3	4
Points	3	6	9	12	15	15	15	18	19	19	19	22	25	28	28	29	29	29	32	35	38	38	41	44	44	47	47	48	49	50	53	56	56	56
GD	1	3	4	7	11	10	7	11	11	10	9	13	15	18	16	16	14	12	13	15	16	13	16	19	18	19	18	18	18	18	19	22	19	17

Updated to match(es) played on October 21, 2023. Source: MLS
H = Home; W = Win; D = Draw; L = Loss; @ = Away

==== Matches ====
February 25 1	Austin FC	2–3	St. Louis City SC	Austin, Texas
7:30pm (CST)	Driussi 45+4'; Gallagher 72'	Report	Ostrák (yellow card) 17'; Parker 24'; Stroud 78'; Klauss 86'	Stadium: Q2 Stadium; Attendance: 20,738; Referee: Allen Chapman

March 4 2	St. Louis City SC	3–1	Charlotte FC	St Louis, Missouri
7:30 pm (CST)	Tuiloma 41' (o.g.); Hiebert (yellow card) 43'; Parker (yellow card) 45'; Löwen 45+5' (pen.); Stroud (yellow card) 61'; Klauss 71'	Report	Copetti 25'; Malanda (yellow card) 39'; Westwood (yellow card) 45+1'; Swiderski (yellow card) 45+4'; Shinyashiki (yellow card) 64'; Byrne (yellow card) 87'	Stadium: CityPark; Attendance: 22,423; Referee: Ted Unkel

March 11 3	Portland Timbers	1–2	St. Louis City SC	Portland, Oregon
9:30 PM PST	McGraw 3', (yellow card) 74'; Zuparic (yellow card) 54'; Moreno (yellow card) 68'	Report	Stroud (yellow card) 29', (goal) 45+1'; Perez (yellow card) 65'; Hiebert 75'	Stadium: Providence Park; Attendance: 23,386; Referee: Victor Rivas

March 18 4	St. Louis City SC	3–0	San Jose Earthquakes	St Louis, Missouri
7:30 pm (CST)	Gioacchini 34'; Klauss 45+3'; Ostrák 68'; Löwen (yellow card) 90+4'	Report	Rodrigues (yellow card) 14'; Trauco (yellow card) 40'; Kikanovic (yellow card) 46'; Cowell (yellow card) 64'; Baldisimo (yellow card) 66'	Stadium: CityPark; Attendance: 22,423; Referee: Rosendo Mendoza

March 25 5	Real Salt Lake	0–4	St. Louis City SC	Sandy, Utah
8:30pm (CST)	Kreilach (yellow card) 24'; Eneli (yellow card) 68'; Glad (yellow card) 75'	Report	Gioacchini 47'; Bartlett (yellow card) 55'; Klauss 61', 66'; Alm 76', (yellow card) 85'	Stadium: America First Field; Attendance: 19,508; Referee: Mark Allatin

April 1 6	St. Louis City SC	0–1	Minnesota United FC	St Louis, Missouri
7:30 pm (CST)	Stroud (yellow card) 28'; Parker (yellow card) 61'; Hiebert (yellow card) 76'	Report	Fragapane (yellow card) 19'; Amarilla 78' (pen.); Arriaga (yellow card) 83'	Stadium: CityPark; Attendance: 22,423; Referee: Jon Freemon

April 8 7	Seattle Sounders FC	3–0	St. Louis City SC	Seattle, Washington
9:30pm (CST)	Atencio 65'; Ruidíaz 71'; Nerwinski 89' (o.g.)	Report	Bartlett (yellow card) 6'; Parker (yellow card) 84'	Stadium: Lumen Field; Attendance: 31,789; Referee: Rubiel Vazquez

April 15 8	St. Louis City SC	5–1	FC Cincinnati	St Louis, Missouri
7:30 pm (CST)	Stroud 3', (yellow card) 80'; Löwen 39'; Hiebert 45+2'; Gioacchini 53'; Celentano 57' (o.g.); Ostrák (yellow card) 76'	Report	Nwobodo (yellow card) 27'; Santos (yellow card) 43', (goal) 62'	Stadium: CityPark; Attendance: 22,423; Referee: Lukasz Szpala

April 22 9	Colorado Rapids	1–1	St. Louis City SC	Commerce City, Colorado
8:30pm (CST)	Abubakar (yellow card) 89'; Barrios 90+2'; Priso (yellow card) 90+6'	Report	Stroud (yellow card) 47'; Alm 57'; Pompeu (yellow card) 79'; Parker (yellow card) 90+5'	Stadium: Dick's Sporting Goods Park; Attendance: 15,045; Referee: Marcos de Oliveira

April 29 10	St. Louis City SC	1–2	Portland Timbers	St Louis, Missouri
7:30 pm (CST)	Hiebert (yellow card) 71'; Pompeu 81'	Report	McGraw (yellow card) 8'; Evander 63' (pen.); Chará 82'; Mosquera (yellow card) 90+2'	Stadium: CityPark; Attendance: 22,423; Referee: Ismail Elfath

May 13 11	Chicago Fire FC	1–0	St. Louis City SC	Chicago, Illinois
12:00 pm (CST)	40' Czichos; (yellow card) 59' Giménez; (yellow card) 64' Herbers	Report	(yellow card) 26' Perez; (yellow card) 43' (yellow-red card) 70' Nelson; (yellow card) 49' Gioacchini	Stadium: Soldier Field; Attendance: 18,231; Referee: Filip Dujic

May 20 12	St. Louis City SC	4–0	Sporting Kansas City	St Louis, Missouri
8:30 pm (CST)	Löwen 19'; Vassilev 25', 75'; Nerwinski (yellow card) 30'; Gioacchini 55'	Report	Kinda (yellow card) 28'; Sallói (yellow card) 42'	Stadium: CityPark; Attendance: 22,423; Referee: Chris Penso

May 27 13	St. Louis City SC	3–1	Vancouver Whitecaps FC	St Louis, Missouri
7:30 pm (CST)	Löwen 10'; Nerwinski (yellow card) 20'; Parker (yellow card) 23'; Blackmon 45' (o.g.); Stroud (yellow card) 60'; Blom (yellow card) 86'; Perez 90+4'	Report	Berhalter (yellow card) 49'; White 83'; Gressel (yellow card) 90+3'; Gauld (yellow card) 90+4'	Stadium: CityPark; Attendance: 22,423; Referee: Serhiy Boyko (Ukraine)

June 3 14	St. Louis City SC	3–0	Houston Dynamo FC	St Louis, Missouri
7:30 pm (CST)	Löwen 9'; Blom (yellow card) 45+5'; Ostrák 51'; Jackson (yellow card) 69'; Gioacchini 83'; Alm (yellow card) 90+1'	Report	Caicedo (yellow card) 45+2'; Carrasquilla (yellow card) 45+5'; Franco (yellow card) 45+7'; Bartlow (yellow card) 78'	Stadium: CityPark; Attendance: 22,423; Referee: Joseph Dickerson

June 7 15	FC Dallas	2–0	St. Louis City SC	Frisco, Texas
7:30pm (CST)	Ferreira 80'; Farfan 89'	Report	Gioacchini (yellow card) 25'; Ostrák (yellow card) 45+3'; Parker (yellow card) 47'; Bartlett (yellow card) 67'	Stadium: Toyota Stadium; Attendance: 19,096; Referee: Drew Fischer
Note: Match originally began on May 6 but was postponed due to inclement weather. It resumed at the 50 minute mark.

June 11 16	St. Louis City SC	1–1	LA Galaxy	St Louis, Missouri
12 pm (CST)	Löwen (yellow card) 8'; Blom (yellow card) 40'; Alm (yellow card) 45+4'; Gioacchini 68'; Ostrák (yellow card) 83'	Report	Brugman (yellow card) 52'; Neal (yellow card) 54'; Aguirre 85'	Stadium: CityPark; Attendance: 22,423; Referee: Victor Rivas

June 17 17	Nashville SC	3–1	St. Louis City SC	Nashville, Tennessee
7:30 pm (CST)	Mukhtar 11', 70', 75'; Bauer (yellow card) 37'; McCarty (yellow card) 45+1'; Washington (yellow card) 83'; Zubak (yellow card) 87'	Report	Vassilev (yellow card) 33'; Gioacchini 41'; Hiebert (yellow card) 54' (yellow-red card) 68'	Stadium: Geodis Park; Attendance: 30,109; Referee: Nima Saghafi

June 21 18	St. Louis City SC	1–3	Real Salt Lake	St Louis, Missouri
7:30 pm (CST)	Gioacchini 21'; Stroud (yellow card) 29'; Ostrák (yellow card) 30'; Nerwinski (yellow card) 47'; Bartlett (yellow card) 55'	Report	Luna 15'; Kreilach 48', 66'; Vera (yellow card) 54'; Beavers (yellow card) 71'	Stadium: CityPark; Attendance: 22,423; Referee: Lukasz Szpala

June 24 19	San Jose Earthquakes	1–2	St. Louis City SC	San Jose, California
9:30 pm (CST)	Monteiro 47', (yellow card) 49'; Tsakiris (yellow card) 84'; Akapo (yellow card) 90+1'	Report	Adeniran 41', 58' (pen.); Jackson (yellow card) 59'; Pompeu (yellow card) 90+2'; Ostrák (yellow card) 90+6'	Stadium: PayPal Park; Attendance: 15,074; Referee: Marcos de Oliveira

July 1 20	St. Louis City SC	2–0	Colorado Rapids	St Louis, Missouri
7:30 pm (CST)	Parker 4'; Stroud 11'	Report	Priso (yellow card) 75'	Stadium: CityPark; Attendance: 22,423; Referee: Fotis Bazakos

July 8 21	Toronto FC	0–1	St. Louis City SC	Toronto, Canada
6:30 pm (CST)	Antonoglou (yellow card) 90+4'	Report	Blom (yellow card) 38'; Parker (yellow card) 47'; Jackson 50'	Stadium: BMO Field; Attendance: 26,156; Referee: Filip Dujic

July 12 22	Los Angeles FC	3–0	St. Louis City SC	Los Angeles, California
9:30 pm (CST)	Cifuentes (yellow card) 14', (goal) 90+2'; Maldonado (yellow card) 30'; Vela 72'; Biuk 82'	Report	Bell (yellow card) 51'; Nerwinski (yellow card) 77'	Stadium: BMO Stadium; Attendance: 22,010; Referee: Joseph Dickerson
Note: Match was rescheduled due to Los Angeles FC's participation in 2023 CONCACAF Champions League.

July 15 23	St. Louis City SC	3–0	Inter Miami CF	St Louis, Missouri
7:30 pm (CST)	Adeniran 28'; Parker 40'; Löwen 80'; Yaro (yellow card) 90+3'	Report	Cremaschi (yellow card) 70'; Miller (yellow card) 79'	Stadium: CityPark; Attendance: 22,423; Referee: Lukasz Szpala

August 20 24	St. Louis City SC	6–3	Austin FC	St Louis, Missouri
8:30 pm (CST)	Blom (yellow card) 17'; Parker 22'; Gioacchini 45+2', 50'; Adeniran 72', 90+5'; Ostrák 88'	Report	Driussi 61' (pen.); Bruin 87'; Rigoni 90+1'	Stadium: CityPark; Attendance: 22,423; Referee: Timothy Ford

August 26 25	Orlando City SC	2–1	St. Louis City SC	Orlando, Florida
6:30 pm (CST)	Torres 48', 90+1' (pen.); Pereyra (yellow card) 56'; Cartagena (yellow card) 73'	Report	Jackson (yellow card) 50'; Adeniran (yellow card) 50'; Alm 79'; Nerwinski (yellow card) 87' (red card) 90+10'; Markanich (yellow card) 90'	Stadium: Exploria Stadium; Attendance: 22,156; Referee: Joseph Dickerson

August 30 26	St. Louis City SC	2–1	FC Dallas	St Louis, Missouri
7:30 pm (CST)	Stroud (yellow card) 44'; Markanich 82'; Thórisson 85'; Vassilev (yellow card) 90+4'	Report	Paes (red card) 12'; Obrain (yellow card) 46'; Farfan (yellow card) 60'; Illarramendi (yellow card) 67'; Quignon (yellow card) 75'; Ansah 90+5'	Stadium: CityPark; Attendance: 22,423; Referee: Guido Gonzales Jr.

September 2 27	Sporting Kansas City	2–1	St. Louis City SC	Kansas City, Kansas
7:30 pm (CST)	Pulido 31', 44', (yellow card) 71'; Melia (yellow card) 86'; Espinoza (yellow card) 90+7'	Report	Adeniran 22'; Alm (yellow card) 81'; Klauss (yellow card) 89'	Stadium: Children's Mercy Park; Attendance: 21,650; Referee: Allen Chapman

September 10 28	LA Galaxy	2–2	St. Louis City SC	Carson, California
7:00 pm (CST)	Mavinga (yellow card) 50'; Puig 53' (pen.); Sharp 82'; Cuevas (yellow card) 90+3'	Report	Adeniran 4', (yellow card) 52' (yellow-red card) 60'; Nilsson (yellow card) 22'; Klauss 28'; Markanich (yellow card) 82'; Hiebert (yellow card) 85'	Stadium: Dignity Health Sports Park; Attendance: 19,554; Referee: Filip Dujic
Note: Match rescheduled from July 4 due to rescheduling of the February 25 Rose Bowl El Tráfico match as a result of inclement weather.

September 16 29	Houston Dynamo	1–1	St. Louis City SC	Houston, Texas
7:30 pm (CST)	Sviatchenko (yellow card) 8'; Escobar (yellow card) 22'; Herrera (yellow card) 25'; Baird 42'; Carrasquilla (yellow card) 61'	Report	Blom (yellow card) 34'; Klauss 87'; Parker (yellow card) 90+5'	Stadium: Shell Energy Stadium; Attendance: 14,369; Referee: Ismir Pekmic

September 20 30	St Louis City SC	0–0	Los Angeles FC	St Louis, Missouri
7:30 pm (CST)	Markanich (yellow card) 89'; Ostrák (yellow card) 90+2'	Report	Palencia (yellow card) 53'; Acosta (yellow card) 84'	Stadium: CityPark; Attendance: 22,423; Referee: Rubiel Vazquez

September 23 31	Minnesota United FC	1–2	St. Louis City SC	Saint Paul, Minnesota
7:30 pm (CST)	St. Clair (yellow card) 20'; Greguš (yellow card) 31'; Pukki 48' (pen.); Boxall (yellow card) 79'; Taylor (yellow card) 85'	Report	Yaro (yellow card) 29'; Bürki (yellow card) 47'; Bell (yellow card) 59'; Klauss 64'; Blom 73'	Stadium: Allianz Field; Attendance: 19,197; Referee: Victor Rivas

September 30 32	St Louis City SC	4–1	Sporting Kansas City	St Louis, Missouri
7:30 pm (CST)	Markanich (yellow card) 41'; Adeniran 73'; Stroud 75'; Klauss 80', 85'; Parker (yellow card) 87'	Report	Agada 90+3'	Stadium: CityPark; Attendance: 22,423; Referee: Armando Villarreal

October 4 33	Vancouver Whitecaps FC	3–0	St. Louis City SC	Vancouver, Canada
9:30 pm (CST)	White 59'; Gauld (yellow card) 79'; Berhalter 82'; Laryea 90+6'	Report	Löwen (yellow card) 42'	Stadium: BC Place; Attendance: 13,776; Referee: Pierre-Luc Lauziere

October 21 34	St. Louis City SC	0–2	Seattle Sounders FC	St Louis, Missouri
8:00 pm (CST)	Parker (yellow card) 75'	Report	Yeimar (yellow card) 18'; Rusnák 23'; C. Roldan (yellow card) 32'; Parker 38' (o.g.); Ragen (yellow card) 71'; Léo Chú (yellow card) 80'; Atencio (yellow card) 87'; Lodeiro (yellow card) 90+5'	Stadium: CityPark; Attendance: 22,423; Referee: Jair Marrufo

=== MLS Cup Playoffs ===
October 29 Round One	St. Louis City SC	1–4	Sporting Kansas City	St. Louis, Missouri
9:00 pm CDT	Parker 28'; Jackson (yellow card) 45'; Stroud (yellow card) 58'; Löwen (yellow card) 70'; Blom (yellow card) 78'; Adeniran (yellow card) 87'	Report	Kinda (yellow card) 15', (goal) 39'; Ndenbe 27'; Walter 36'; Sallói 61'	Stadium: CityPark; Attendance: 22,423; Referee: Ted Unkel

November 5 Round One	Sporting Kansas City	2–1	St. Louis City SC	Kansas City, Kansas
4:00 pm CST	Pulido (yellow card) 42'; Ndenbe 45+1', (yellow card) 69'; Sallói 73'; Rosero (yellow card) 81'; Espinoza (yellow card) 90+14'	Report	Löwen (yellow card) 23'; Parker (yellow card) 32'; Pompeu 86'; Hiebert (yellow card) 90+6'	Stadium: Children's Mercy Park; Attendance: 21,650; Referee: Ismail Elfath
Note: Sporting Kansas City won the series 2–0.

=== U.S. Open Cup ===
April 25 Third Round	St. Louis City SC (MLS) (Missouri)	5–1	(Nebraska) Union Omaha (USL1)	St. Louis, Missouri
7:00 PM CDT	Jackson 3', 66'; Gallardo 48' (o.g.); Watts 62'; Löwen 86'	Report	Palacios (yellow card) 25'; Dolabella 79'	Stadium: CityPark; Attendance: 22,423; Referee: Lorenzo Hernandez

May 9 Round of 32	Chicago Fire FC (MLS) (Illinois)	2–1	(Missouri) St. Louis City SC (MLS)	Bridgeview, Illinois
7:00 PM CDT	Haile-Selassie 3'; Herbers 75'	Report	Pompeu (yellow card) 70'; Perez 90+3'	Stadium: SeatGeek Stadium; Attendance: 4,371; Referee: Brandon Stevis

=== Leagues Cup ===
==== Central 1 ====
Pos	Team	Pld	W	PW	PL	L	GF	GA	GD	Pts	Qualification	CLB	CAM	STL
1	(United States) Columbus Crew	2	2	0	0	0	6	2	+4	6	Advance to knockout stage	—	—	2–1
2	(Mexico) América	2	1	0	0	1	5	4	+1	3	Advance to knockout stage	1–4	—	4–0
3	(United States) St. Louis City SC	2	0	0	0	2	1	6	−5	0		—	—	—

Source: Leagues Cup
Rules for classification: Tiebreakers

July 23 Group stage	Columbus Crew (United States)	2–1	(United States) St. Louis City SC	Columbus, Ohio
7:30 pm ET	Zelarayán 11'; Hernández 29' (pen.); Cheberko (yellow card) 88'; Farsi (yellow card) 90+3'	Report	Adeniran (yellow card) 56'; Russell-Rowe 85' (o.g.); Pompeu (yellow card) 90+5'	Stadium: Lower.com Field; Attendance: 20,533; Referee: Reon Radix

July 27 Group stage	St. Louis City SC (United States)	0–4	(Mexico) América	St. Louis, Missouri
10:00 pm ET	Parker (yellow card) 16'; Löwen (yellow card) 81'; Hiebert (yellow card) 84'; Jackson (yellow card) 85'	Report	Martín 5'; Santos (yellow card) 49'; Quiñones 51'; Álvarez 54'; Zendejas 77'	Stadium: CityPark; Attendance: 22,430; Referee: Selvin Brown

== Statistics ==
=== Appearances ===
As of match played October 29, 2023

No.	Pos.	Name	Total		MLS		U.S. Open Cup		Leagues Cup		MLS Cup	
No.	Pos.	Name	Start	Sub	Start	Sub	Start	Sub	Start	Sub	Start	Sub
1	GK	(Switzerland) Roman Bürki	36	0	33	0	0	0	1	0	2	0
2	DF	(United States) Jake Nerwinski	27	5	25	4	0	0	1	1	1	0
4	DF	(Sweden) Joakim Nilsson	8	1	7	1	0	0	0	0	1	0
6	MF	(South Africa) Njabulo Blom	23	7	21	5	0	1	0	1	2	0
7	MF	(Czech Republic) Tomáš Ostrák	15	20	13	17	1	1	1	1	0	1
8	MF	(United States) Jared Stroud	29	8	25	6	1	1	1	1	2	0
9	FW	(Brazil) Joao Klauss	16	5	14	5	0	0	0	0	2	0
10	MF	(Germany) Eduard Löwen	34	5	29	4	1	1	2	0	2	0
11	FW	(United States) Nicholas Gioacchini	25	12	24	8	0	1	1	1	0	2
12	MF	(Brazil) Célio Pompeu	12	20	9	17	2	0	1	1	0	2
13	DF	(United States) Anthony Markanich	8	3	7	3	0	0	0	0	1	0
14	DF	(United States) John Nelson	15	3	14	3	0	0	1	0	0	0
15	DF	(Ghana) Joshua Yaro	12	7	9	7	1	0	1	0	1	0
16	FW	(United States) Samuel Adeniran	13	9	11	7	0	0	1	1	1	1
17	DF	(Bosnia and Herzegovina) Selmir Pidro	2	2	0	2	2	0	0	0	0	0
19	MF	(United States) Indiana Vassilev	29	11	25	9	1	1	1	1	2	0
20	MF	(United States) Akil Watts	15	8	11	7	2	0	1	0	1	1
21	MF	(Sweden) Rasmus Alm	15	8	13	8	0	0	2	0	0	0
22	DF	(Canada) Kyle Hiebert	27	4	24	3	1	0	1	0	1	1
23	DF	(United States) Jon Bell	3	2	2	1	0	1	1	0	0	0
24	DF	(United States) Lucas Bartlett	14	3	12	2	1	0	1	1	0	0
25	MF	(United States) Aziel Jackson	16	15	12	13	2	0	1	1	1	1
26	DF	(United States) Tim Parker	33	0	29	0	1	0	1	0	2	0
28	MF	(United States) Miguel Perez	10	8	7	8	2	0	1	0	0	0
29	FW	(Iceland) Nökkvi Thórisson	1	8	1	8	0	0	0	0	0	0
30	MF	(Denmark) Isak Jensen	2	11	0	11	2	0	0	0	0	0
31	GK	(United States) Michael Creek	0	0	0	0	0	0	0	0	0	0
39	GK	(Germany) Ben Lundt	4	0	1	0	2	0	1	0	0	0
46	FW	(United States) Caden Glover	0	1	0	1	0	0	0	0	0	0

=== Goalkeeper statistics ===
As of match played October 29, 2023

	(Switzerland) Roman Bürki					(Germany) Ben Lundt				
	MIN	GA	GAA	SV	CS	MIN	GA	GAA	SV	CS
MLS	2,970	42	1.27	123	8	90	3	3.00	4	0
U.S. Open Cup	0	0	0	0	0	180	3	1.50	4	0
Leagues Cup	90	4	4.00	3	0	90	2	2.00	7	0
MLS Cup	180	6	3.00	8	0	0	0	0	0	0
Total	3,240	52	1.44	134	8	360	8	2.00	15	0

=== Goals & Assists ===
As of match played October 29, 2023

No.	Pos.	Name	Total		MLS		U.S. Open Cup		Leagues Cup		MLS Cup	
No.	Pos.	Name	Goals	Assists	G	A	G	A	G	A	G	A
2	DF	(United States) Jake Nerwinski	0	2	0	2	0	0	0	0	0	0
6	MF	(South Africa) Njabulo Blom	1	2	1	1	0	0	0	0	0	1
7	MF	(Czech Republic) Tomáš Ostrák	3	2	3	2	0	0	0	0	0	0
8	MF	(United States) Jared Stroud	5	5	5	5	0	0	0	0	0	0
9	FW	(Brazil) Joao Klauss	10	4	10	4	0	0	0	0	0	0
10	MF	(Germany) Eduard Löwen	7	15	6	14	1	1	0	0	0	0
11	FW	(United States) Nicholas Gioacchini	10	1	10	1	0	0	0	0	0	0
12	MF	(Brazil) Célio Pompeu	2	5	1	2	0	3	0	0	1	0
13	DF	(United States) Anthony Markanich	1	0	1	0	0	0	0	0	0	0
14	DF	(United States) John Nelson	0	1	0	1	0	0	0	0	0	0
16	FW	(United States) Samuel Adeniran	8	1	8	1	0	0	0	0	0	0
19	MF	(United States) Indiana Vassilev	2	5	2	5	0	0	0	0	0	0
20	MF	(United States) Akil Watts	1	1	0	1	1	0	0	0	0	0
21	MF	(Sweden) Rasmus Alm	3	4	3	4	0	0	0	0	0	0
22	DF	(Canada) Kyle Hiebert	2	1	2	1	0	0	0	0	0	0
24	DF	(United States) Lucas Bartlett	0	1	0	1	0	0	0	0	0	0
25	MF	(United States) Aziel Jackson	3	4	1	4	2	0	0	0	0	0
26	DF	(United States) Tim Parker	5	0	4	0	0	0	0	0	1	0
28	MF	(United States) Miguel Perez	2	0	1	0	1	0	0	0	0	0
29	FW	(Iceland) Nökkvi Thórisson	1	0	1	0	0	0	0	0	0	0
Total			66	54	59	49	5	4	0	0	2	1
			5	×	3	×	1	×	1	×	0	×

=== Disciplinary record ===
As of match played October 29, 2023

No.	Pos.	Name	Total		MLS		U.S. Open Cup		Leagues Cup		MLS Cup	
No.	Pos.	Name	Yellow card	Red card	Yellow card	Red card	Yellow card	Red card	Yellow card	Red card	Yellow card	Red card
1	G	(Switzerland) Roman Bürki	1	0	1	0	0	0	0	0	0	0
2	DF	(United States) Jake Nerwinski	5	1	5	1	0	0	0	0	0	0
4	DF	(Sweden) Joakim Nilsson	1	0	1	0	0	0	0	0	0	0
6	MF	(South Africa) Njabulo Blom	7	0	6	0	0	0	0	0	1	0
7	MF	(Czech Republic) Tomáš Ostrák	7	0	7	0	0	0	0	0	0	0
8	MF	(United States) Jared Stroud	9	0	8	0	0	0	0	0	1	0
9	FW	(Brazil) Joao Klauss	1	0	1	0	0	0	0	0	0	0
10	MF	(Germany) Eduard Löwen	6	0	3	0	0	0	1	0	2	0
11	FW	(United States) Nicholas Gioacchini	2	0	2	0	0	0	0	0	0	0
12	MF	(Brazil) Célio Pompeu	3	0	2	0	1	0	0	0	0	0
13	DF	(United States) Anthony Markanich	4	0	4	0	0	0	0	0	0	0
14	DF	(United States) John Nelson	1	1	1	1	0	0	0	0	0	0
15	DF	(Ghana) Joshua Yaro	2	0	2	0	0	0	0	0	0	0
16	FW	(United States) Samuel Adeniran	4	1	2	1	0	0	1	0	1	0
19	MF	(United States) Indiana Vassilev	2	0	2	0	0	0	0	0	0	0
21	MF	(Sweden) Rasmus Alm	4	0	4	0	0	0	0	0	0	0
22	DF	(Canada) Kyle Hiebert	7	1	5	1	0	0	1	0	1	0
23	DF	(United States) Jon Bell	2	0	2	0	0	0	0	0	0	0
24	DF	(United States) Lucas Bartlett	4	0	4	0	0	0	0	0	0	0
25	MF	(United States) Aziel Jackson	5	0	3	0	0	0	1	0	1	0
26	DF	(United States) Tim Parker	12	0	10	0	0	0	1	0	1	0
28	MF	(United States) Miguel Perez	2	0	2	0	0	0	0	0	0	0
Total			91	4	77	4	1	0	5	0	8	0

== Awards ==
=== MLS Player of the Matchday ===
Matchday	Player	Opponent	Contribution	Minutes	Result
35	(Brazil) Joao Klauss	Sporting Kansas City	2 Goals	90	W 4-1

=== MLS Goal of the Matchday ===
The MLS Goal of the Matchday is selected each Matchday of the regular season through fan voting in a process conducted by MLS Communications.

Matchday	Player	Opponent	Score	Result	Vote %
5	(Brazil) Joao Klauss	Real Salt Lake	2-0	W 4-0	38.1%
15	(Germany) Eduard Löwen	Vancouver Whitecaps FC	1-0	W 3-1	63.8%
26	(Germany) Eduard Löwen	Inter Miami CF	3-0	W 3-0	45%
27	(United States) Samuel Adeniran	Austin FC	4-1	W 6-3	51.1%
34	(South Africa) Njabulo Blom	Minnesota United FC	2-1	W 2-1	57.7%

=== MLS Team of the Matchday ===
Matchday	Selection(s)		Opponent
1	XI	(Germany) Eduard Löwen	@ATX
1	BENCH	(Brazil) Joao Klauss	@ATX
1	COACH	(South Africa) Bradley Carnell	@ATX
2	XI	(Germany) Eduard Löwen	CLT
3	XI	(Canada) Kyle Hiebert	@POR
3	BENCH	(United States) Jared Stroud	@POR
3	COACH	(South Africa) Bradley Carnell	@POR
4	XI	(Brazil) Joao Klauss	SJ
4	BENCH	(United States) Jake Nerwinski	SJ
5	XI	(Brazil) Joao Klauss	@RSL
5	BENCH	(Switzerland) Roman Bürki	@RSL
5	COACH	(South Africa) Bradley Carnell	@RSL
8	XI	(Germany) Eduard Löwen (United States) Jared Stroud	CIN
9	XI	(Switzerland) Roman Bürki	@COL
12	BENCH	(Switzerland) Roman Bürki	@CHI
14	XI	(United States) Indiana Vassilev (United States) Tim Parker (Switzerland) Roman Bürki	SKC
15	XI	(Germany) Eduard Löwen	VAN
17	XI	(Germany) Eduard Löwen	HOU
18	BENCH	(United States) Tim Parker	LA
21	XI	(United States) Sam Adeniran (Switzerland) Roman Bürki	@SJ
22	XI	(United States) Tim Parker	COL
24	BENCH	(United States) Aziel Jackson	@TOR
26	XI	(United States) Tim Parker	MIA
26	BENCH	(Switzerland) Roman Bürki	MIA
27	XI	(United States) Niko Gioacchini (Germany) Eduard Löwen	ATX
27	BENCH	(United States) Sam Adeniran	ATX
29	BENCH	(Ghana) Josh Yaro (Germany) Eduard Löwen	DAL
31	BENCH	(United States) Aziel Jackson	@LA
32	BENCH	(Brazil) Joao Klauss	@HOU
33	XI	(Switzerland) Roman Bürki	LAFC
34	XI	(South Africa) Njabulo Blom	@MIN
35	XI	(Brazil) Joao Klauss (Germany) Eduard Löwen	SKC
35	BENCH	(Switzerland) Roman Bürki	SKC

=== MLS All-Star Selections ===
The 2023 MLS All-Star game was held on July 19, 2023, at Audi Field in Washington D.C. against Arsenal FC.

No.	Position	Name	All-Star Selection	Start/Bench	Minutes
1	GK	(Switzerland) Roman Bürki	1st	Start	34
26	DF	(United States) Tim Parker	1st	Bench	45

=== MLS Year-End Awards ===
==== Individual Awards ====
CITY, along with FC Cincinnati and Atlanta United FC are the most represented clubs with finalists in four award categories each.

Award	Name	Status
Allstate MLS Goalkeeper of the Year	(Switzerland) Roman Bürki	Winner
MLS Defender of the Year	(United States) Tim Parker	Finalist
MLS Newcomer of the Year	(Germany) Eduard Löwen	Finalist
Sigi Schmid MLS Coach of the Year	(South Africa) Bradley Carnell	Finalist

==== MLS Best XI ====
CITY were one of four clubs to have two honorees for 2023 MLS Best XI.

No.	Position	Name	Best XI Selection
1	GK	(Switzerland) Roman Bürki	1st
26	DF	(United States) Tim Parker	1st

== Transfers ==
=== In ===
No.	Pos.	Player	Transferred from	Fee	Date	Source
17	DF	(Bosnia and Herzegovina) Selmir Pidro	(Bosnia and Herzegovina) FK Sarajevo	Undisclosed	February 2, 2022	
7	MF	(Czech Republic) Tomáš Ostrák	(Germany) 1. FC Koln	Free	March 1, 2022	
9	FW	(Brazil) Joao Klauss	(Germany) TSG 1899 Hoffenheim	Undisclosed	March 3, 2022	
1	GK	(Switzerland) Roman Bürki	(Germany) Borussia Dortmund	Free	March 16, 2022	
4	DF	(Sweden) Joakim Nilsson	(Germany) Arminia Bielefeld	Free	June 1, 2022	
10	MF	(Germany) Eduard Löwen	(Germany) Hertha BSC	Undisclosed	June 24, 2022	
30	MF	(Denmark) Isak Jensen	(Denmark) SonderjyskE Fodbold	Free	July 11, 2022	
22	DF	(Canada) Kyle Hiebert	(United States) St. Louis City 2	Free	August 3, 2022	
15	DF	(Ghana) Joshua Yaro	(United States) St. Louis City 2	Free	August 3, 2022	
25	MF	(United States) Aziel Jackson	(United States) Minnesota United FC	Undisclosed	November 7, 2022	
8	MF	(United States) Jared Stroud	(United States) Austin FC	Undisclosed	November 7, 2022	
21	MF	(Sweden) Rasmus Alm	(Sweden) IF Elfsborg	Free	November 8, 2022	
11	FW	(United States) Nicholas Gioacchini	(United States) Orlando City SC	Undisclosed	November 12, 2022	
19	MF	(United States) Indiana Vassilev	(United States) Inter Miami CF	Undisclosed	November 12, 2022	
23	DF	(United States) Jon Bell	(United States) New England Revolution	Undisclosed	November 12, 2022	
14	DF	(United States) John Nelson	(United States) FC Cincinnati	Undisclosed	November 12, 2022	
—	FW	(United States) Jake LaCava	(United States) New York Red Bulls	Undisclosed	November 12, 2022	
26	DF	(United States) Tim Parker	(United States) Houston Dynamo	Undisclosed	November 12, 2022	
20	MF	(United States) Akil Watts	(United States) St. Louis City 2	Free	November 17, 2022	
12	MF	(Brazil) Célio Pompeu	(United States) St. Louis City 2	Free	November 17, 2022	
44	MF	(Germany) Max Schneider	(United States) St. Louis City 2	Free	November 18, 2022	
2	DF	(United States) Jake Nerwinski	(Canada) Vancouver Whitecaps FC	Free	November 28, 2022	
16	FW	(United States) Samuel Adeniran	(United States) Seattle Sounders FC	Undisclosed	December 15, 2022	
18	MF	(United States) Owen O'Malley	(United States) Creighton University	Free (SuperDraft)	December 22, 2022	
41	MF	(United States) John Klein	(United States) Saint Louis University	Free (SuperDraft)	December 22, 2022	
6	MF	(South Africa) Njabulo Blom	(South Africa) Kaizer Chiefs	Undisclosed	December 23, 2022	
39	GK	(Germany) Ben Lundt	(United States) Phoenix Rising FC	Free	January 6, 2023	
46	FW	(United States) Caden Glover	(United States) St. Louis City SC Academy	Free	January 9, 2023	
19	FW	(United States) Indiana Vassilev	(England) Aston Villa	Free	January 31, 2023	
28	MF	(United States) Miguel Perez	(United States) St. Louis City SC Academy	Free	February 21, 2023	
31	GK	(United States) Michael Creek	(United States) St. Louis City 2	Free	March 1, 2023	
24	DF	(United States) Lucas Bartlett	(United States) FC Dallas	Free	March 8, 2023	
29	FW	(Iceland) Nökkvi Thórisson	(Belgium) K Beerschot VA	Undisclosed	July 21, 2023	
13	DF	(United States) Anthony Markanich	(United States) Colorado Rapids	Undisclosed	August 1, 2023	

=== Out ===
No.	Pos.	Player	Transferred to	Fee	Date	Source
—	FW	(United States) Jake LaCava	(United States) Inter Miami CF	$150,000	November 11, 2022	
—	MF	(United States) John Klein III	(United States) St. Louis City 2	Free	February 28, 2023	

=== Loan in ===
No.	Pos.	Player	Transferred from	Fee	Date	Source
41	MF	(United States) John Klein III	(United States) St. Louis City 2	Loan	May 20, 2023	

=== Loan out ===
No.	Pos.	Player	Transferred to	Fee	Date	Source
31	GK	(United States) Michael Creek	(United States) St. Louis City 2	Loan	March 26, 2023	
18	MF	(United States) Owen O' Malley	(United States) St. Louis City 2	Loan	March 26, 2023	
25	MF	(United States) Aziel Jackson	(United States) St. Louis City 2	Loan	March 26, 2023	
30	MF	(Denmark) Isak Jensen	(United States) St. Louis City 2	Loan	March 26, 2023	
44	MF	(Germany) Max Schneider	(United States) St. Louis City 2	Loan	March 26, 2023	
12	MF	(Brazil) Célio Pompeu	(United States) St. Louis City 2	Loan	April 2, 2023	
20	DF	(United States) Akil Watts	(United States) St. Louis City 2	Loan	April 2, 2023	
39	GK	(Germany) Ben Lundt	(United States) St. Louis City 2	Loan	April 2, 2023	
46	FW	(United States) Caden Glover	(United States) St. Louis City 2	Loan	April 7, 2023	
16	FW	(United States) Samuel Adeniran	(United States) San Antonio FC	Loan	April 25, 2023	
23	DF	(United States) Jon Bell	(United States) St. Louis City 2	Loan	April 30, 2023	
30	MF	(Denmark) Isak Jensen	(Denmark) Viborg FF	Loan	August 30, 2023	
