= João Klauss =

Brazilian footballer (born 1997)

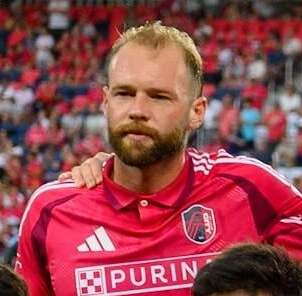
- Klauss with St. Louis City in 2025

Personal information
- Full name: João Klauss de Mello
- Date of birth: 1 March 1997 (age 29)
- Place of birth: Criciúma, Brazil
- Height: 1.90 m (6 ft 3 in)
- Position: Striker

Team information
- Current team: LA Galaxy
- Number: 99

Youth career
- 2006–2010: Internacional
- 2010–2011: Juventude
- 2011–2016: Grêmio

Senior career*
Years	Team	Apps	(Gls)
2017–2020	TSG Hoffenheim II	27	(6)
2018	→ HJK (loan)	33	(21)
2019–2020	→ LASK (loan)	42	(15)
2020–2022	TSG Hoffenheim	4	(0)
2021–2022	→ Standard Liège (loan)	39	(7)
2022	→ Sint-Truiden (loan)	8	(2)
2022	St. Louis City 2	4	(4)
2023–2025	St. Louis City	79	(25)
2026–	LA Galaxy	12	(8)
- * Club domestic league appearances and goals as of 12 October 2026

João Klauss de Mello (born 1 March 1997), sometimes known as just Klauss, is a Brazilian professional footballer who plays as a striker for Major League Soccer club LA Galaxy.

== Early life ==
João Klauss de Mello was born in Criciúma, Santa Catarina. He began his career with Internacional in Porto Alegre, joining the club at the age of nine. Klauss moved with his mother to Porto Alegre after his parents separated. Both parents supported his football career from early on. At the age of 13, he was released from Internacional's youth program and moved to Juventude in Caxias do Sul. After a year, he moved back to Porto Alegre and joined the Grêmio's youth academy.

== Club career ==
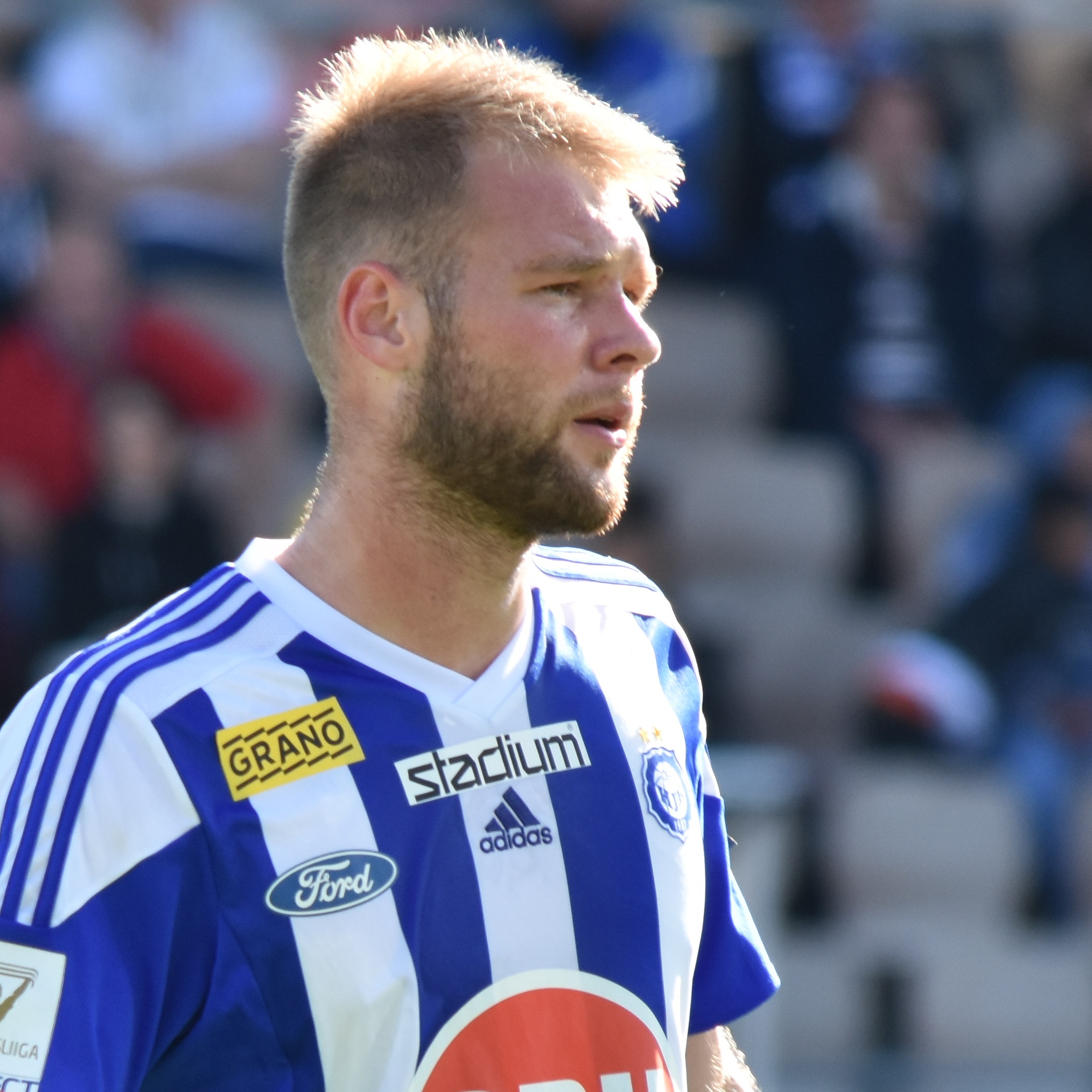
Klauss with HJK in 2018

Klauss signed for his first European club in January 2017, when he moved to TSG Hoffenheim in Germany. He initially struggled with the cultural change. He played 17 matches and scored four goals for Hoffenheim II in the Regionalliga Südwest.

He was loaned to HJK in March 2018. On 8 April, he scored in his debut in the Veikkausliiga against Ilves.

On 8 January 2019, Klauss was loaned out to LASK until 30 June 2020. On 31 January 2022, Klauss joined Sint-Truiden on loan.

Klauss joined Major League Soccer side St. Louis City SC in July 2022, following his loan at Sint-Truiden. He was the club's first designated player. On February 25, 2023, the opening match of the MLS season, Klauss scored the winning goal in a 3–2 victory over Austin FC, the first win in St. Louis's franchise history. At the end of the 2023 season, Klauss was tied with Nicholas Gioacchini for being the club's leading goal scorer, after scoring 10 goals. On June 14, 2025, Klauss scored the first hat trick in St. Louis City SC history in a home match against the Los Angeles Galaxy. Once again at the end of the 2025 season, Klauss was the club's leading goal scorer with 10 goals.

On January 27, 2026, Saint Louis City SC announced that the club had received $2.375 million for Klauss in a trade with LA Galaxy.

== Personal life ==
Born in Brazil, Klauss is of German descent through his father, and Italian descent through his mother. He holds an Italian passport.

== Career statistics ==
As of match played 22 March 2026

Appearances and goals by club, season and competition
Club	Season	League			National cup (Note: Includes Finnish Cup, Austrian Cup, DFB-Pokal, Belgian Cup, U.S. Open Cup)		Continental		Other		Total	
Club	Season	Division	Apps	Goals	Apps	Goals	Apps	Goals	Apps	Goals	Apps	Goals
TSG 1899 Hoffenheim II	2016–17	Regionalliga Südwest	7	1	–		–		–		7	1
TSG 1899 Hoffenheim II	2017–18	Regionalliga Südwest	17	4	–		–		–		17	4
TSG 1899 Hoffenheim II	2020–21	Regionalliga Südwest	3	1	–		–		–		3	1
TSG 1899 Hoffenheim II	Total		27	6	–		–		–		27	6
HJK (loan)	2018	Veikkausliiga	33	21	3	2	6 (Note: Four appearances and one goal in UEFA Champions League, two appearances in UEFA Europa League)	1	–		42	24
LASK (Loan)	2018–19	Austrian Bundesliga	14	3	2	1	–		–		16	4
LASK (Loan)	2019–20	Austrian Bundesliga	28	12	4	3	13 (Note: Four appearances and two goals in UEFA Champions League, nine appearances and three goals in UEFA Europa League)	5	–		45	20
LASK (Loan)	Total		42	15	6	4	13	5	–		61	24
TSG Hoffenheim	2020–21	Bundesliga	4	0	1	0	5 (Note: Appearances in UEFA Europa League)	0	–		10	0
Standard Liège (loan)	2020–21	Belgian First Division A	19	5	5	1	–		–		24	6
Standard Liège (loan)	2021–22	Belgian First Division A	20	2	3	1	–		–		23	3
Standard Liège (loan)	Total		39	7	8	2	–		–		47	9
Sint-Truiden (loan)	2021–22	Belgian First Division A	8	2	–		–		–		8	2
St. Louis City 2	2022	MLS Next Pro	4	4	–		–		–		4	4
St. Louis City	2023	MLS	19	10	0	0	–		2 (Note: Appearances in MLS Cup Playoffs)	0	21	10
St. Louis City	2024	MLS	27	5	–		2 (Note: Appearances in CONCACAF Champions Cup)	0	–		29	5
St. Louis City	2025	MLS	33	10	2	2	–		–		35	12
St. Louis City	Total		79	25	2	2	2	0	2	0	85	27
LA Galaxy	2026	MLS	5	5	–		4	1	–		9	6
Career total			241	85	20	10	30	7	2	0	293	102

== Honours ==
HJK

- Veikkausliiga: 2018

St. Louis City SC

- Western Conference (regular season): 2023

Individual

- Veikkausliiga Player of the Year: 2018
- Veikkausliiga Top scorer: 2018
- Veikkausliiga Striker of the Year: 2018
- Veikkausliiga Breakthrough the Year: 2018
- Veikkausliiga Team of the Year: 2018
- Veikkausliiga Player of the Month: August 2018, September 2018
