= Kyle Hiebert =

Canadian soccer player (born 1997)

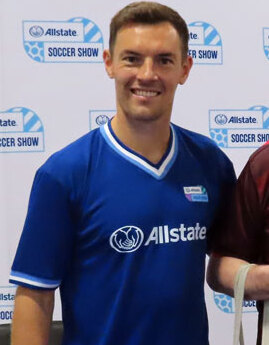
- Hiebert in 2026

Personal information
- Full name: Kyle Anthony Hiebert
- Date of birth: July 30, 1997 (age 29)
- Place of birth: Winnipeg, Manitoba, Canada
- Height: 1.83 m (6 ft 0 in)
- Position: Defender

Team information
- Current team: St. Louis City SC
- Number: 22

Youth career
- Linden Woods CC
- WSA Winnipeg

College career
Years	Team	Apps	(Gls)
2015–2021	Missouri State Bears	88	(6)

Senior career*
Years	Team	Apps	(Gls)
2013–2017	WSA Winnipeg	54	(0)
2022	St. Louis City 2	24	(3)
2023–	St. Louis City SC	69	(3)
2024–	→ St. Louis City 2 (loan)	4	(1)

International career^{‡}
2014	Canada U18	3	(0)
2023–	Canada	2	(0)
- * Club domestic league appearances and goals as of February 28, 2026 ‡ National team caps and goals as of June 9, 2024

Kyle Anthony Hiebert (born July 30, 1997) is a Canadian professional soccer player who plays for Major League Soccer club St. Louis City SC and the Canada national team.

== Early life ==
Born in Winnipeg, Hiebert grew up in La Salle, Manitoba. He started playing soccer at age 3, beginning playing organized soccer at age eight with Linden Woods CC. He began playing with WSA Winnipeg's youth sides at age 10. In 2012, he was part of a Manitoba-Saskatchewan team that competed in the national all-stars competition in Newfoundland. In his youth, he attempted to trial with the Vancouver Whitecaps Academy, but it did not work out. He was named the 2016 Manitoba Soccer Player of the Year.

== College career ==
In 2015, he committed to Missouri State University to play for the men's soccer team. Due to injury, he was forced to redshirt both the 2015 and 2016 seasons, after tearing the medial collateral ligament in his left knee in 2015 while playing with WSA Winnipeg in the PDL and then tearing the posterior cruciate ligament in his right knee during the 2016 pre-season with Missouri State.

He scored his first goal on October 24, 2017 against the Valparaiso Crusaders. That year, he was named to the United Soccer Coaches All-West Region Second Team and earned Scholar All-North/Central Region, CoSIDA Academic All-American Third team, CoSIDA Academic All-District VI team, and Missouri Valley Conference Scholar-Athlete first team honours.

In 2018, he earned United Soccer Coaches Scholar All-American Third Team, CoSIDA Academic All-America Division I First Team, MVC Scholar-Athlete First Team, CoSIDA All-District VI Team and MVC Scholar-Athlete Spotlight, MVC All-Conference Second Team and United Soccer Coaches All-West Region Third Team honours and was named Missouri State Male Junior of the Year.

In 2019, he was named to the United Soccer Coaches All-America Second Team, was named MVC Defensive Player of the Year, and earned All-MVC First Team, Valley’s All-Tournament team, MVC Defensive Player of the Week on Sept. 17, All-West Region First Team, CoSIDA Academic All-America First Team, United Soccer Coaches Scholar All-America First Team, CoSIDA Academic All-District VI Team, and United Soccer Coaches Scholar All-North/Central Region Team distinctions and was named MVC Scholar-Athlete of the Year for men’s soccer.

In the spring of 2021 (due to the postponed 2020 season), he was named MVC Defensive Player of the Year, a United Soccer Coaches First Team All-American, United Soccer Coaches All-West Region first team, All-MVC first team, MVC Scholar-Athlete of the Year, United Soccer Coaches National Scholar of the Year, United Soccer Coaches Scholar All-America first team, MVC Scholar-Athlete first team, United Soccer Coaches Scholar All-Region and CoSIDA Academic All-District honours. He was also a MAC Hermann Trophy semifinalist.

In 2021, he was named a CoSIDA Academic All-America Team Member, first-team All-MVC, MVC Scholar Athlete team, United Soccer Coaches All-American distinction. Senior Class Award All-American First Team), earned the MVC Elite 17 Award and was named to the MSU Athletic Director's Honor Roll. He was also named MVC Defender of the Year for the third-straight year, becoming the first player to do so and was a semifinalist for the MAC Hermann Trophy for the second consecutive year.

== Club career ==
He began playing for WSA Winnipeg in the Premier Development League in 2013 at the age of 15.

After not being selected in the 2022 MLS SuperDraft, Hiebert signed a professional contract with St. Louis City 2 in MLS Next Pro in February 2022. He scored his first professional goal on June 25 against the Real Monarchs. He appeared in every match for the team that season. At the end of the season, he was named to the MLS Next Pro Best XI.

In August 2022, Hiebert signed a pre-contract with St. Louis City SC to join the team for their debut season in Major League Soccer in 2023. He made his MLS debut in their inaugural match against Austin FC on February 25, 2023. On March 11 he scored his first MLS goal, scoring the winning goal in a 2-1 victory over the Portland Timbers. As a result, he was named to the league's Team of the Matchday for week three. In December 2023, he signed an extension with the club through the 2026 season, with an option for 2027.

== International career ==
In April 2014, he was called up to a camp for the Canada U18 team. In October, he was named to the roster for the U18 Tournoi Limoges, where he made 3 appearances.

In March 2023, he was called up to the Canada senior team for the first time, ahead of a pair of CONCACAF Nations League matches as a replacement for the injured Kamal Miller. He made his debut on March 28, in a substitute appearance, against Honduras.

In June 2024, Hiebert was named to Canada's squad for the 2024 Copa América.

== Personal life ==
Hiebert holds a U.S. Green Card, making him a domestic player for United States soccer leagues. After earning his bachelor's and master's degree in accounting, Hiebert worked as an accountant while also playing professionally with St. Louis City 2.

== Career statistics ==
=== Club ===
As of match played October 18, 2025

Appearances and goals by club, season and competition
Club	Season	League			National cup		Continental		Other		Total	
Club	Season	Division	Apps	Goals	Apps	Goals	Apps	Goals	Apps	Goals	Apps	Goals
WSA Winnipeg	2013	PDL	11	0	—		—		—		11	0
WSA Winnipeg	2014	PDL	14	0	—		—		—		14	0
WSA Winnipeg	2015	PDL	10	0	—		—		—		10	0
WSA Winnipeg	2016	PDL	7	0	—		—		—		7	0
WSA Winnipeg	2017	PDL	12	0	—		—		—		12	0
WSA Winnipeg	Total		54	0	0	0	0	0	0	0	54	0
St. Louis City 2	2022	MLS Next Pro	24	3	2	0	—		3 (Note: Appearances in MLS Next Pro playoffs)	0	29	3
St. Louis City SC	2023	MLS	27	2	1	0	—		3 (Note: Appearances in Leagues Cup and MLS Cup playoffs)	0	31	2
St. Louis City SC	2024	MLS	20	0	—		—		4 (Note: Appearances in Leagues Cup)	0	24	0
St. Louis City SC	2025	MLS	20	1	2	0	0	0	0	0	22	1
St. Louis City SC	Total		67	3	3	0	0	0	7	0	77	3
St. Louis City 2	2024	MLS Next Pro	1	1	—		—		—		1	1
Career total			146	7	5	0	0	0	10	0	161	7

=== International ===
As of match played June 9, 2024

Appearances and goals by national team and year
National team	Year	Apps	Goals
Canada	2023	1	0
Canada	2024	1	0
Total		2	0

== Honors ==
St. Louis City SC

- Western Conference (regular season): 2023
