= Miguel Perez (soccer, born 2005) =

American soccer player (born 2005)

Personal information
- Date of birth: April 28, 2005 (age 21)
- Place of birth: St. Louis, Missouri, United States
- Height: 5 ft 11 in (1.80 m)
- Position: Midfielder

Team information
- Current team: St. Louis City
- Number: 28

Youth career
- 2021–2023: St. Louis City

Senior career*
Years	Team	Apps	(Gls)
2022–2023	St. Louis City 2	13	(0)
2023–	St. Louis City	15	(1)
2024	→ Birmingham Legion (loan)	27	(0)
2026–	St. Louis City 2	0	(0)

International career
2023	United States U19	2	(1)
- * Club domestic league appearances and goals as of October 27, 2024

Miguel Perez (born April 28, 2005) is an American professional soccer player who plays as a midfielder for Major League Soccer club St. Louis City SC.

== Career ==
=== Youth ===
Perez was born in St. Louis, Missouri, and graduated from Pattonville High School. He played varsity soccer for his high school team and also joined several clubs associated with the Olympic Development Program. Perez was scouted by the St. Louis City SC academy in November 2020 and joined them the following year. In 2022, Perez made seven appearances for St. Louis City 2, the club's reserve and development team in MLS Next Pro.

=== St. Louis City ===
On February 21, 2023, Perez signed a three-year homegrown player deal with Major League Soccer's St. Louis City SC ahead of their inaugural season. He made his MLS debut on February 26, 2023, appearing as a 59th-minute substitute during a 3–2 win over Austin FC. He scored his first MLS goal in the St. Louis City SC home game against the Vancouver Whitecaps, on May 27, 2023, two days after graduation from high school.

==== Birmingham Legion (loan) ====
On January 22, 2024, Perez was loaned to USL Championship club Birmingham Legion. St. Louis maintained the option to recall Perez at any point throughout the season.

== Career statistics ==
=== Club ===
As of October 27, 2024

Club	Season	League			National cup		Continental		Other		Total	
Club	Season	Division	Apps	Goals	Apps	Goals	Apps	Goals	Apps	Goals	Apps	Goals
St. Louis City 2	2022	MLS Next Pro	7	0	–		–		–		7	0
St. Louis City 2	2023	MLS Next Pro	6	0	–		–		–		6	0
St. Louis City SC	2023	MLS	15	1	2 (Note: Appearance in US Open Cup)	1	–		1 (Note: Appearance in Leagues Cup)	0	18	2
Birmingham Legion FC loan	2024	USL Championship	27	0	2	0	–		–		29	0
Career total			55	1	4	1	0	0	1	0	60	2

== Honors ==
St. Louis City SC

- Western Conference (regular season): 2023
