= Tim Parker (soccer) =

American soccer player (born 1993)

- Parker with the New York Red Bulls in 2026

Personal information
- Full name: Timothy Ryan Parker
- Date of birth: February 23, 1993 (age 33)
- Place of birth: Hicksville, New York, United States
- Height: 6 ft 2 in (1.88 m)
- Position: Center-back

Team information
- Current team: New York Red Bulls
- Number: 26

College career
Years	Team	Apps	(Gls)
2011–2014	St. John's Red Storm	79	(4)

Senior career*
Years	Team	Apps	(Gls)
2012	Long Island Rough Riders	7	(0)
2013	Brooklyn Italians	5	(0)
2015–2017	Vancouver Whitecaps FC	76	(1)
2015	→ Whitecaps FC 2 (loan)	7	(0)
2018–2020	New York Red Bulls	79	(1)
2021–2022	Houston Dynamo	62	(0)
2023–2024	St. Louis City SC	50	(4)
2024	New England Revolution	7	(0)
2025–	New York Red Bulls	30	(1)

International career
2011	United States U18		
2016	United States U23	1	(0)
2018	United States	2	(0)
- * Club domestic league appearances and goals as of November 6, 2026

Timothy Ryan Parker (born February 23, 1993) was an American professional soccer player who plays as a center-back for Major League Soccer club New York Red Bulls.

== Early career ==
Parker played his high school soccer at Hicksville High School, serving as team captain for his final two seasons. During his senior season, Parker scored 25 goals and had eight assists, earning him numerous accolades, including being named the 2010–11 Gatorade New York Boys Soccer Player of the Year.

He played four seasons of college soccer at St. John's University. He made a total of 79 appearances for the Red Storm and tallied four goals and four assists. He helped St. John's win the 2011 Big East Conference Men's Soccer Tournament and qualify for the NCAA Tournament from 2011 to 2013. He captained the Red Storm for his senior season. He made the 2011 Big East All-Freshman team, 2012 All-Big East 2nd team, and the 2013 and 2014 All-Big East 1st teams. Parker also made the 2012 and 2013 NSCAA All-Region 1st team and the 2014 NSCAA All-Region 3rd team.

While at St. John's, he also played in the Premier Development League for the Long Island Rough Riders and appeared for the Brooklyn Italians in the National Premier Soccer League in 2013.

== Professional career ==
=== Vancouver Whitecaps FC ===
On January 15, 2015, Parker was selected 13th overall in the 2015 MLS SuperDraft by Vancouver Whitecaps FC. On March 30, he made his professional debut for Vancouver's USL affiliate club Whitecaps FC 2 in a 4–0 defeat to Seattle Sounders FC 2. Parker made his debut for the Whitecaps first team, as well as MLS debut, on May 2, coming on as a late substitute in a 0–0 draw with Cascadia Cup rivals Portland Timbers. He made his first start for the Whitecaps in their next match, a 3–0 win against the Philadelphia Union. On August 5, he scored in his CONCACAF Champions League debut against Cascadia Cup rivals Seattle Sounders FC. Parker made four appearances and scored one goal during the CCL group stage as the Whitecaps finished last in their group. In Canadian Championship play, Parker started all four of Vancouver's matches. On August 26, he scored in the second leg of the final against the Montreal Impact, helping Vancouver win their first championship 4–2 on aggregate. He made 15 appearances in MLS regular season play, helping the Whitecaps finish 2nd in the Western Conference and qualify for the playoffs. Parker was part of a Vancouver defense that allowed 36 goals during the season, tied for the fewest in the league. Vancouver's first opponent in the playoffs was Portland, and despite Parker playing every minute of both legs, the Whitecaps would lose 2–0 on aggregate to the eventual MLS Cup champion Timbers.

Parker and Vancouver opened the 2016 season on March 6 with a 3–2 loss to the Impact. On June 29, 2016, Parker scored in his second straight Canadian Championship final, giving the Whitecaps a 2–0 lead in the match and 2–1 aggregate lead. Vancouver gave up a goal in five minutes into stoppage time to Will Johnson, leveling the aggregate score at 2–2 and giving Toronto FC the win on away goals. Parker ended the 2016 MLS season with 29 appearances. However, it was a poor season for the Whitecaps, finishing 8th in the conference and missing out on the playoffs. In Champions League play, Parker made three appearances in the group stage, helping Vancouver finish top of their group.

The first match of the 2017 season for the Whitecaps came on February 22 in the Champions League knockout stage, a 1–1 draw with the New York Red Bulls in leg 1 of the quarterfinals. Parker played in all 4 of Vancouver's CCL games in 2017, helping the Whitecaps reach the semifinals, where they lost to Tigres 4–1 on aggregate. Vancouver and Parker opened the 2017 MLS season on March 5 with a 0–0 draw against Philadelphia. On May 20, he scored his first career MLS goal in a 2–0 victory against Sporting Kansas City. Parker ended the regular season with 32 appearances, one goal and one assist, helping the Whitecaps finish 3rd in the Western Conference and qualify for the playoffs. In the first round of the playoffs, Parker had an assist as Vancouver defeated the San Jose Earthquakes 5–0. He started both legs of the conference semifinals, a 2–0 aggregate loss to the Seattle Sounders.

=== New York Red Bulls ===
"There's no doubt that he's changed our backline and changed our team entirely, He's an unbelievable player, since he's come here we've been a rock defensively. To sign a guy like that is unbelievable for us."

— Aaron Long on the impact of Parker on the Red Bulls, October 2018.

On March 2, 2018, Parker was traded to the New York Red Bulls in exchange for Felipe, $500,000 in targeted allocation money (TAM), and a 2018 international roster slot. On March 6, 2018, he made his Red Bulls debut, appearing as a starter in a 2–0 victory in Mexico over Club Tijuana in the CONCACAF Champions League. He made 4 CCL appearances during 2018, helping New York reach the semifinals, where they lost to eventual champions Guadalajara 1–0 on aggregate. He played his first MLS game with the Red Bulls on March 17, a 1–0 loss to Real Salt Lake. On September 30, 2018, Parker scored his first goal for New York in a 2–0 victory over Atlanta United FC. He ended his first season with the Red Bulls with one goal and two assists in 29 MLS regular season appearances. Parker partnered with fellow center-back Aaron Long to anchor the best defense in MLS, allowing a league low 33 goals and keeping a league leading 15 clean sheets. Parker helped the Red Bulls win the Supporters' Shield with a then-record 71 points. Parker played every minute of the playoffs as the Red Bulls reached the conference finals, where they lost 3–1 on aggregate to eventual MLS Cup champions Atlanta United, with Parker scoring New York's goal. Following the 2018 season, Parker signed a new contract with the Red Bulls.

Parker and the Red Bulls opened the 2019 season on February 20 with a 2–0 win over Atlético Pantoja in the CONCACAF Champions League. Parker made four appearances in the Champions League as New York reached the quarterfinals, where they lost to Santos Laguna with an aggregate score of 6–2. He made 31 MLS regular season appearances in 2019, helping the Red Bulls finish 6th in the Eastern Conference and qualify for the playoffs. On October 20, scored in the Red Bulls opening game of the playoffs, however, New York would lose 4–3 to the Philadelphia Union in extra time.

On October 28, 2020, Parker got an assist in the 89th minute to give the Red Bulls a 1–0 win over the New England Revolution, heading a corner kick onto Aaron Long, who put the ball into the net. In a shortened season due to the COVID-19 pandemic, Parker ended the regular season with one assist from 19 appearances (out of a possible 23), helping New York finish 6th in the Eastern Conference and qualify for the playoffs. In the Red Bulls' first playoff game, Parker played the full 90 minutes, but New York lost to eventual MLS Cup champions Columbus Crew 3–2.

=== Houston Dynamo ===
On January 19, 2021, Parker was traded to the Houston Dynamo in exchange for $450,000 of General Allocation Money, and a further $600,000 in performance-based incentives. He made his Dynamo debut on April 16, playing the full 90 minutes in a 2–1 win over the San Jose Earthquakes. On June 23, Parker signed a contract extension with Houston until 2024. Parker played every minute of the season for Houston, making 34 appearances, however the team did not enjoy a successful campaign, finishing last in the Western Conference and failing to qualify for the playoffs. Parker was named co-captain before the season, but actually wore the captain's armband for most of the season due to veteran Boniek García, the primary captain, only starting six games.

Parker made 28 appearances, 26 of them starts, in the 2022 regular season, but Houston missed the playoffs again after finishing 13th in the conference. He also made an appearance in the Open Cup.

=== St. Louis City SC ===
On November 11, 2022, Parker was traded to St. Louis City SC ahead of their inaugural season for $500,000 of GAM, with Houston paying a portion of his salary. On February 25, 2023, the opening match of the season, Parker scored the first goal in St. Louis' franchise history against Austin FC, as the match eventually ended in a 3-2 victory for his side. In his first season with St. Louis, Parker was voted in to the 2023 MLS Best XI as he helped guide the club to an appearance in the MLS Cup Playoffs in the club's inaugural season. Parker netted a career-best five goals during the 2023 season across 33 overall appearances.

=== New England Revolution ===
On August 2, 2024, St. Louis City traded Parker plus $600,000 in General Allocation Money to the New England Revolution, in exchange for Henry Kessler.

=== Return to New York Red Bulls ===
On February 6, 2025, Parker returned to the New York Red Bulls on a one year deal with an option for 2026. On September 20, 2025, Parker helped New York to a 2-0 victory over CF Montréal, scoring the opening goal of the match.

== International career ==
In January 2016, Parker received his first call-up to the senior United States squad for friendlies against Iceland and Canada. He did not appear in either of the two matches. Two years later, he was called up for a friendly against Bosnia and Herzegovina. Parker made his senior team debut against Ireland on June 2, 2018.

== Personal life ==
Parker was born and raised in Hicksville, New York to Ken and Kathy Parker. He has one older brother, Kevin. He attended Hicksville High School and St. John's University, where he majored in finance. Before committing to soccer, Parker also played lacrosse.

== Career statistics ==
=== Club ===
As of match played November 6, 2026

Appearances and goals by club, season and competition
Club	Season	League			Playoffs (Note: Includes MLS Cup playoffs, USL Championship playoffs)		National cup (Note: Includes Canadian Championship, U.S. Open Cup)		Continental		Total	
Club	Season	Division	Apps	Goals	Apps	Goals	Apps	Goals	Apps	Goals	Apps	Goals
Vancouver Whitecaps FC	2015	Major League Soccer	15	0	2	0	4	1	4 (Note: Appearances in CONCACAF Champions League)	1	25	2
Vancouver Whitecaps FC	2016	Major League Soccer	29	0	—		3	1	3	0	35	1
Vancouver Whitecaps FC	2017	Major League Soccer	32	1	3	0	1	0	4	0	40	1
Vancouver Whitecaps FC	Total		76	1	5	0	8	2	11	1	100	4
Whitecaps FC 2 (loan)	2015	USL Championship	7	0	—		—		—		7	0
New York Red Bulls	2018	Major League Soccer	29	1	4	1	1	0	4	0	38	2
New York Red Bulls	2019	Major League Soccer	31	0	1	1	1	0	4	0	37	1
New York Red Bulls	2020	Major League Soccer	19	0	1	0	—		—		20	0
New York Red Bulls	Total		79	1	6	2	2	0	8	0	95	3
Houston Dynamo	2021	Major League Soccer	34	0	—		—		—		34	0
Houston Dynamo	2022	Major League Soccer	28	0	—		1	0	—		29	0
Houston Dynamo	Dynamo Total		62	0	0	0	1	0	0	0	63	0
St Louis City SC	2023	Major League Soccer	29	4	2	1	1	0	1 (Note: Appearance(s) in Leagues Cup)	0	33	5
St Louis City SC	2024	Major League Soccer	21	0	0	0	0	0	2 (Note: One appearance and one goal in CONCACAF Champions Cup, one appearance in Leagues Cup)	1	23	1
St Louis City SC	Total		50	4	2	1	1	0	3	1	56	6
New England Revolution	2024	Major League Soccer	7	0	—		—		—		7	0
New York Red Bulls	2025	Major League Soccer	13	1	0	0	1	0	2	0	16	1
New York Red Bulls	2026	Major League Soccer	17	0	—		1	0	—		18	0
New York Red Bulls	Total		30	1	0	0	2	0	2	0	34	1
Career total			311	7	13	3	14	2	24	2	362	14

=== International ===
As of June 10, 2018

Appearances and goals by national team and year
National team	Year	Apps	Goals
United States	2018	2	0
Total		2	0

== Honors ==
Vancouver Whitecaps

- Canadian Championship: 2015

New York Red Bulls

- MLS Supporters' Shield: 2018

St. Louis City SC

- Western Conference (regular season): 2023

Individual

- MLS All-Star: 2023
- MLS Best XI: 2023
