= Nökkvi Þeyr Þórisson =

Icelandic footballer (born 1999)

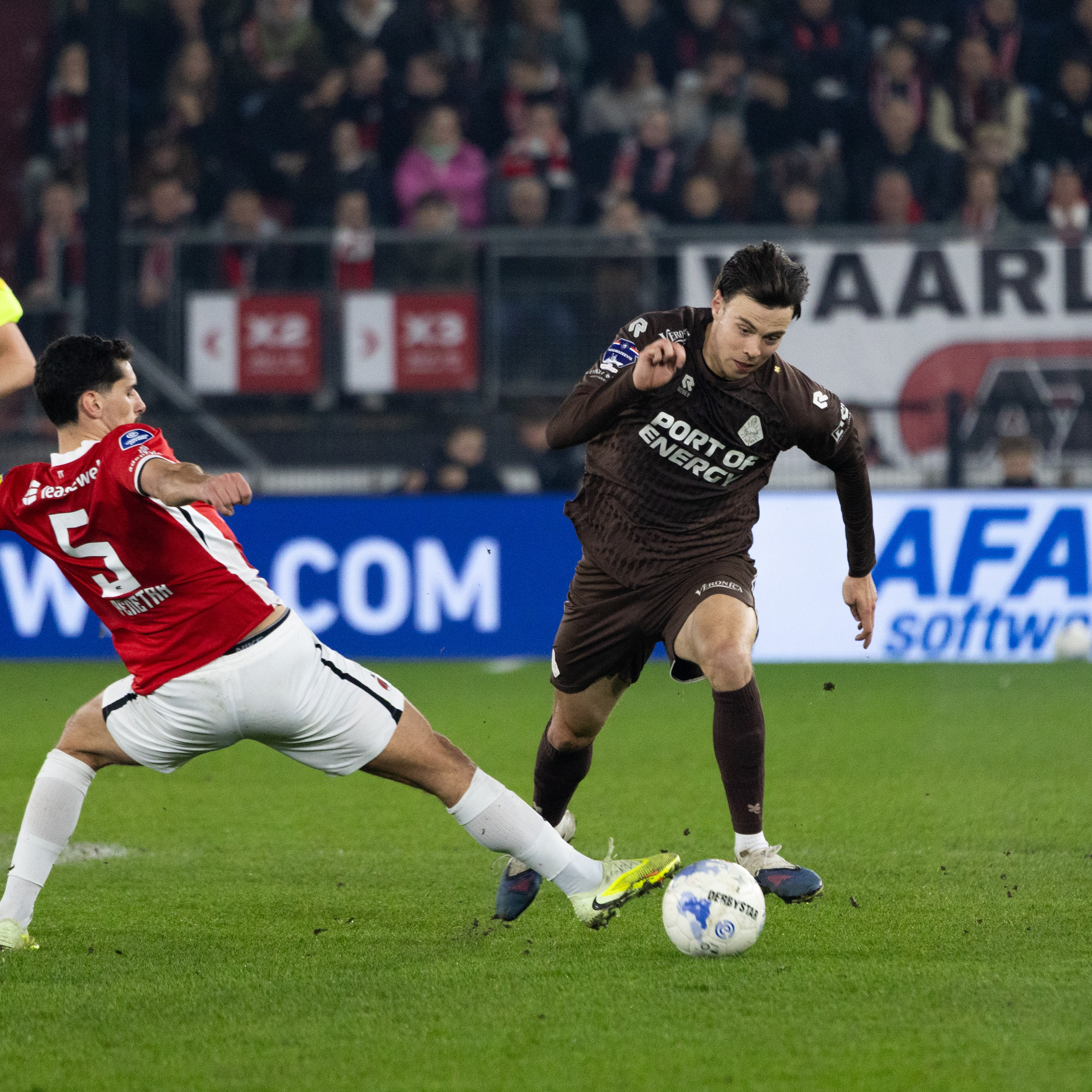
- Nökkvi with Telstar in 2026

Personal information
- Date of birth: 13 August 1999 (age 27)
- Place of birth: Dalvík, Iceland
- Height: 1.88 m (6 ft 2 in)
- Position: Winger

Team information
- Current team: Telstar (on loan from Sparta Rotterdam)
- Number: 11

Youth career
- –2011: Dalvík
- 2011–2012: Þór Akureyri
- 2012–2013: Dalvík
- 2014–2015: Þór Akureyri
- 2015–2018: Hannover

Senior career*
Years	Team	Apps	(Gls)
2018	Dalvík/Reynir	16	(10)
2019–2022	KA Akureyri	65	(23)
2022–2023	Beerschot	28	(7)
2023–2025	St. Louis City SC	39	(5)
2025	→ Sparta Rotterdam (loan)	12	(2)
2025–	Sparta Rotterdam	13	(1)
2026	→ Telstar (loan)	7	(1)
2026–	→ Telstar (loan)	4	(0)

International career^{‡}
2013	Iceland U15	1	(0)
2023	Iceland	1	(0)
- * Club domestic league appearances and goals as of 12:24, 14 October 2026 (UTC) ‡ National team caps and goals as of 8 January 2023

Nökkvi Þeyr Þórisson, transliterated as Nökkvi Theyr Thórisson in English, (born 13 August 1999) is an Icelandic professional footballer who plays as a winger for Eredivisie club Telstar, on loan from Sparta Rotterdam, and the Iceland national team.

== Club career ==
=== Early years ===
He started training with his local club Dalvík, switching to his father's old club Þór Akureyri for two separate spells before joining German side Hannover's youth team along with his twin brother Þorri Mar Þórisson.

In 2018 the brothers returned to their first club Dalvík/Reynir and played with them in the Icelandic fourth tier, with Nökkvi scoring 10 goals in 16 appearances. The next season they joined KA Akureyri in the Icelandic top tier and Nökkvi played with them for four seasons. In his final season with KA he helped them achieve 2nd place, their best result since winning the league for the only time in 1989, by becoming the top scorer of the 2022 Besta deild karla with 17 goals, despite leaving to join Belgian side Beerschot before the end of the season. By joining Beerschot, he and his twin brother were now playing for separate clubs for the first time.

=== St. Louis City ===
On 21 July 2023, Nökkvi signed with Major League Soccer side St. Louis City for an undisclosed transfer fee.

=== Sparta Rotterdam ===
On 14 January 2025, Nökkvi moved on loan to Sparta Rotterdam until the end of June, with an option to buy. He scored twice in twelve appearances over the half-season. On 3 June 2025, Sparta exercised the option and Nökkvi signed a contract until mid-2028. Technical director Gerard Nijkamp said that taking up the option had been one of the club's first priorities for the summer.

Nökkvi played less under Maurice Steijn in the 2025–26 season than he had during the loan. During pre-season he had scored a first-half hat-trick for Jong Sparta in a 5–0 friendly win over Telstar, who fielded a mixture of young players and a trialist.

==== Loans to Telstar ====
On 3 February 2026, Sparta loaned Nökkvi to fellow Eredivisie club Telstar for the remainder of the season, with no option to buy included. He had by then made 25 appearances for Sparta in all, scoring three times. Injury restricted him at Telstar to eight appearances, seven of them in the league. The club finished fourteenth and stayed up.

Nökkvi returned to Sparta for the 2026–27 season and was preferred to Milan Zonneveld at centre-forward by manager Rogier Meijer in the opening rounds. On 14 August he set up the opening goal and scored the second in a 2–1 win at Telstar, Sparta's first of the season. He had made three appearances and scored once when, on 29 August 2026, he rejoined Telstar on loan for the rest of the season. Technical director Peter Hofstede said that Nökkvi knew the club and what was expected of him.

== International career ==
Nökkvi made his international debut for Iceland on 8 January 2023 in a friendly match against Estonia.

== Career statistics ==
=== Club ===
As of match played 11 October 2026

Appearances and goals by club, season and competition
Club	Season	League			National cup (Note: Includes Icelandic Men's Football Cup, Belgian Cup, KNVB Cup)		Europe		Other		Total	
Club	Season	Division	Apps	Goals	Apps	Goals	Apps	Goals	Apps	Goals	Apps	Goals
Dalvík/Reynir	2018	3. deild karla	16	10	—		—		—		16	10
KA Akureyri	2019	Úrvalsdeild	17	2	1	0	—		—		18	2
KA Akureyri	2020	Úrvalsdeild	9	1	1	2	—		—		10	3
KA Akureyri	2021	Úrvalsdeild	19	3	1	0	—		—		20	3
KA Akureyri	2022	Besta deild karla	20	17	3	5	—		—		23	22
KA Akureyri	Total		65	23	6	7	0	0	0	0	71	30
Beerschot	2022-23	Belgian Pro League	28	7	2	1	—		—		30	8
St. Louis City SC	2023	MLS	9	1	—		—		—		9	1
St. Louis City SC	2024	MLS	30	4	—		1 (Note: Appearances in CONCACAF Champions Cup)	0	4 (Note: Appearances in Leagues Cup)	0	35	4
St. Louis City SC	Total		39	5	0	0	1	0	4	0	44	5
Sparta Rotterdam (loan)	2024–25	Eredivisie	12	2	—		—		—		12	2
Sparta Rotterdam	2025–26	Eredivisie	10	0	3	1	—		—		13	1
Sparta Rotterdam	2026–27	Eredivisie	3	1	0	0	—		—		3	1
Sparta Rotterdam	Total		13	1	3	1	—		—		16	2
Telstar (loan)	2025–26	Eredivisie	7	1	1	0	—		—		8	1
Telstar (loan)	2026–27	Eredivisie	4	0	0	0	—		—		4	0
Career total			184	49	12	9	1	0	4	0	201	58

=== International ===
As of match played 8 January 2023

Appearances and goals by national team and year
National team	Year	Apps	Goals
Iceland	2023	1	0
Total		1	0

== Honors ==
St. Louis City SC

- Western Conference (regular season): 2023
