= Rasmus Alm =

Swedish footballer (born 1995)

Personal information
- Date of birth: 17 August 1995 (age 31)
- Place of birth: Landskrona, Sweden
- Height: 1.74 m (5 ft 9 in)
- Positions: Left midfielder; right midfielder; attacking midfielder

Team information
- Current team: Örgryte IS
- Number: 10

Youth career
- Borstahusens BK
- IK Wormo
- Landskrona BoIS

Senior career*
Years	Team	Apps	(Gls)
2013–2017	Landskrona BoIS	77	(12)
2018	Brommapojkarna	7	(0)
2019	Degerfors	15	(5)
2019–2022	Elfsborg	89	(23)
2023–2025	St. Louis City SC	42	(5)
2025	St. Louis City 2	1	(0)
2026–	Örgryte IS	1	(0)
- * Club domestic league appearances and goals as of February 28, 2026

Rasmus Alm (born 17 August 1995) is a Swedish professional footballer who plays as a midfielder for Örgryte IS.

== Career ==
Alm started his career with Borstahusens BK before moving to IK Wormo at the age of 14 and later Landskrona BoIS.

After his time with Landskrona BolS, Alm joined IF Brommapojkarna in 2018 totaling seven appearances. In 2019, Alm joined Degerfors IF, playing in sixteen matches with five goals and four assists. In 2019, Alm signed with IF Elfsborg for four seasons.

On November 8, 2022, Alm signed with Major League Soccer side, St. Louis City SC, for the club's inaugural season in 2023. Alm was signed through the 2025 season with a club option for 2026. On May 11, 2024, Alm scored the fastest goal in club history, scoring against Chicago Fire 1 minute and 24 seconds into the match.

On July 7, 2025, Alm was placed on the MLS Season-Ending Injury list due to osteitis pubis, an inflammation of the pubic bone, as well as sports hernias and adductor strains.

Following Alm's placement on the Season-Ending Injury list, St. Louis City SC announced in October 2025 that the club declined his contract option for the 2026 season.

== Career statistics ==
=== Club ===
As of match played 4 May 2025

Appearances and goals by club, season and competition
Club	Season	League			National cup (Note: Includes Svenska Cupen, U.S. Open Cup)		Continental		Other		Total	
Club	Season	Division	Apps	Goals	Apps	Goals	Apps	Goals	Apps	Goals	Apps	Goals
Landskrona BoIS	2013	Superettan	4	0	0	0	—		—		4	0
Landskrona BoIS	2014	Superettan	16	1	1	0	—		—		17	1
Landskrona BoIS	2015	Division 1	23	2	2	0	—		—		25	2
Landskrona BoIS	2016	Division 1	19	5	2	0	—		—		21	5
Landskrona BoIS	2017	Division 1	15	4	5	0	—		—		20	4
Landskrona BoIS	Total		77	12	10	0	—		—		87	12
Brommapojkarna	2018	Allsvenskan	8	0	1	0	—		0	0	9	0
Degerfors IF	2019	Superettan	15	5	3	1	—		—		18	6
Elfsborg	2019	Allsvenskan	9	2	1	0	—		—		10	2
Elfsborg	2020	Allsvenskan	30	9	5	2	—		—		35	11
Elfsborg	2021	Allsvenskan	24	6	4	1	6 (Note: Appearance(s) in UEFA Europa Conference League)	0	—		34	7
Elfsborg	2022	Allsvenskan	26	6	5	2	2	1	—		33	9
Elfsborg	Total		89	23	15	5	8	1	—		112	29
St. Louis City SC	2023	MLS	21	3	0	0	2 (Note: Appearance(s) in Leagues Cup)	0	0	0	23	3
St. Louis City SC	2024	MLS	20	2	0	0	0	0	—		20	2
St. Louis City SC	2025	MLS	0	0	0	0	—		—		0	0
St. Louis City SC	Total		41	5	0	0	2	0	0	0	43	5
St. Louis City 2	2025	MLS Next Pro	1	0	—		—		—		1	0
Career total			231	45	29	6	10	1	0	0	270	52

== Honors ==
St. Louis City SC

- Western Conference (regular season): 2023
