= Akil Watts =

American soccer player (born 2000)

Personal information
- Full name: Akil Amen-Diop Watts
- Date of birth: February 4, 2000 (age 26)
- Place of birth: Fort Wayne, Indiana, United States
- Height: 5 ft 10 in (1.78 m)
- Position: Right-back

Team information
- Current team: Loudoun United
- Number: 23

Youth career
- 2015–2017: IMG Academy
- 2017–2018: Portland Timbers
- 2018–2019: Mallorca

Senior career*
Years	Team	Apps	(Gls)
2019	Mallorca B	1	(0)
2019–2021	Louisville City	34	(0)
2022	St. Louis City 2	24	(6)
2023–2025	St. Louis City	57	(1)
2023–2025	→ St. Louis City 2 (loan)	15	(3)
2026–	Loudoun United	12	(0)

International career
2016–2017	United States U17	17	(2)
- * Club domestic league appearances and goals as of October 31, 2026

Akil Amen-Diop Watts (born February 4, 2000) is an American professional soccer player who plays as a right-back.

== Career ==
=== Club ===
Watts started his career playing for Portland Timbers Academy. In 2018, after his performances at the 2017 FIFA U-17 World Cup, he signed a professional contract with Spanish team RCD Mallorca. On August 6, 2019, he signed with Louisville City FC at the USL Championship. On August 30, 2019, Watts made his professional debut when he started and played 56 minutes of the 1–1 draw against Indy Eleven at the USL Championship. Following the 2021 season, Louisville opted to decline their contract option on Watts. In 2022, Watts signed with MLS Next Pro team, St. Louis City 2, for the club's inaugural season. He later signed to the club's affiliate Major League Soccer team, St. Louis City SC in November 2022.

=== International ===
Watts represented the United States at the 2017 CONCACAF U-17 Championship and the 2017 FIFA U-17 World Cup. At the World Cup, he played three, of the five matches, the Americans played at the World Cup, including the "Round of 16" 5–0 win against Paraguay (when he started and played the entire match) and the "Quarter-finals" 4–1 defeat against England (when he started and played 86 minutes).

== Honors ==
St. Louis City SC

- Western Conference (regular season): 2023
