= Samuel Adeniran =

American soccer player

Personal information
- Full name: Samuel Oluwabukunmi Adeniran
- Date of birth: September 30, 1998 (age 28)
- Place of birth: Houston, Texas, United States
- Height: 6 ft 4 in (1.93 m)
- Position: Forward

Team information
- Current team: LASK
- Number: 7

Youth career
- Houston Texans
- Houston Express
- 2016–2017: Belenenses

Senior career*
| Years | Team | Apps | (Gls) |
| 2018–2019 | Leganés B | 0 | (0) |
| 2018 | → Chacarita Juniors (loan) | 0 | (0) |
| 2018 | → Guadalajara (loan) | 14 | (7) |
| 2019 | → Castellón (loan) | 0 | (0) |
| 2019–2020 | Kickers Emden | 13 | (6) |
| 2020–2021 | Atlas Delmenhorst | 7 | (2) |
| 2021 | Tacoma Defiance | 30 | (13) |
| 2021–2022 | Seattle Sounders FC | 3 | (0) |
| 2022 | → Tacoma Defiance (loan) | 8 | (2) |
| 2022 | → San Antonio FC (loan) | 23 | (12) |
| 2023–2024 | St. Louis City SC | 35 | (10) |
| 2023 | → San Antonio FC (loan) | 7 | (4) |
| 2024 | Philadelphia Union | 7 | (0) |
| 2025– | LASK | 51 | (16) |
- * Club domestic league appearances and goals as of October 31, 2026

Samuel Oluwabukunmi Adeniran (born September 30, 1998) is an American professional soccer player who plays as a forward for Austrian Football Bundesliga club LASK.

== Youth career ==
=== Early career ===
Adeniran began his soccer career playing in Houston area youth clubs, including Houston Texans and Houston Express. He played two seasons of high school varsity soccer at Cypress Christian School in Houston, scoring 21 goals in 18 games as a freshman and 31 goals in 23 games as a sophomore.

=== Liverpool Foundation College ===
When he has 16, Adeniran moved to England to attend the Liverpool Foundation College (now called the Steven Gerrard Academy) designed to develop football talent and progress in education. With the college's U19 team, he returned to Texas in 2016 to play in the Dallas Cup.

=== Belenenses ===
After his time at Liverpool Foundation College, Adeniran went to Portugal, where his brother was playing at the time. He signed for Belenenses and joined its U19 team. Adeniran played 4 games for the U19 team, scoring his lone goal in a 3–1 loss to Benfica's U19 team on April 1, 2017.

== Career ==
=== Leganés ===
Adeniran began his professional career by signing with Leganés B in Spain in January 2018. He would then go on a series of loans, never playing for the team before he departed it.

=== Chacarita Juniors ===
In January 2018, Adeniran's first loan, which began as a trial, was with Chacarita in Argentina Prima Division. During his preseason trial, he scored for both the first team and reserve team in friendlies. The loan became official for the 2018 Clausura, in which he became the first United States player on the team, was part of an initial player exchange with CD Leganes, which saw Lautaro Ruiz go to the Spanish team. The exchange was initiated by a minority owner of Leganes who sought to build an informal partnership between the teams. Adeniran's stint was with the reserve team and he made no first team appearances. On April 20, 2018, the Chacarita Juniors Board of Directors ended the player exchange and both players returned to their respective teams.

=== Guadalajara (Spain) ===
On July 1, 2018, after he returned to Spain, Adeniran was loaned to Guadalajara in the 4th tier of Spanish football. For the first time in his professional career, Samuel's brother, Ayodeji Adeniran, would later join him at the team yet not play in a game together. Samuel made his debut on August 26, 2018, in the team's 3–2 win over Azaqueca. He ultimately scored 7 goals in 13 games, with Leganes then ending his loan early so he could play in a higher division.

=== Castellón ===
On January 1, 2019, Adeniran was loaned to Castellón in the 3rd tier of Spanish football. He made no first team appearances and made just three gameday rosters as an unused reserve. Both Adeniran's loan with CD Castellon and his contract with Leganes expired on June 30, 2019, at which point Adeniran became a free agent.

=== Kickers Emden ===
On August 1, 2019, Adeniran signed with Kickers Emden in the OL Niedersachsen, German 5th tier of football, after he completed a successful trial. Once again, he would be joined by his brother, Ayodeji Adeniran, at the team. Samuel scored in his debut on September 7, 2019, in a 2–0 win over HSC/BW Tudern. The brothers' first game together as gameday teammates was September 22, 2019, in a 2–2 tie against MTV Gifhorn. Samuel ultimately scored 6 goals in 13 games during the season.

=== Atlas Delmenhorst ===
On August 18, 2020, Adeniran signed with Atlas Delmenhorst of the German fourth-tier Regionalliga Nord. He would score 2 goals in 7 games before games began to be cancelled in Germany due to the COVID-19 pandemic.

In early January 2021 as the German leagues were cancelling games due to the COVID-19 pandemic, Adeniran requested his contract with the club be terminated to allow him to play in the United States.

=== Tacoma Defiance ===
On March 15, 2021, Adeniran signed with USL Championship side Tacoma Defiance. He made his debut for Tacoma on May 16, 2021, appearing as a 75th-minute substitute during a 1–0 win over Orange County SC.

He was USL Championship Player of the Week in week 25 after scoring a second half hat trick in a 4–1 win against Orange County SC on October 9, 2021.

In his 30 games, he scored 13 goals, which were tied for 12th most in the league.

While on Seattle's roster in 2022, Adeniran played 8 games for Tacoma, scoring 2 goals.

=== Seattle Sounders ===
During the 2021 MLS season, Adeniran was recalled several times from Tacoma by the Seattle Sounders FC when the team had roster hardships. He made his Seattle debut on July 18, 2021, in a 1–0 loss against Minnesota United FC.

On December 14, 2021, Adeniran made the permanent move to the Seattle Sounders FC first team roster.

Between the 2021 and 2022 seasons, he played 6 games across all competitions before being loaned again in the pursuit of more playing time.

=== San Antonio FC ===
Based on his performances with Tacoma, On June 9, 2022, Seattle loaned Adeniran to San Antonio FC of USL Championship. He made his debut on June 11, 2022, in a 3–2 win over Monterey Bay FC. He finished the regular season with 10 goals in 20 games while scoring 2 goals in 3 playoff games. Adeniran scored the game-winning goal for San Antonio in its 3–1 win over Louisville City FC in the USL Championship title game.

In 2023, he would be loaned to San Antonio FC a second time as he sought more playing time then he was getting at St. Louis City SC. In the short loan, he would score 4 goals in 7 games before being recalled to St. Louis City SC.

=== St. Louis City SC ===
On December 15, 2022, Adeniran was traded to St. Louis City SC in exchange for $100,000 of General Allocation Money. He received minimal playing time in the early games of St. Louis City SC initial season in 2023, so he again sought a loan in search of more playing time. He was recalled hours ahead of the June 24 game against San Jose and was immediately placed in the starting line-up, scoring both goals in a 2–1 win over San Jose Earthquakes, which landed him on the MLS Team of Matchday 21. Adeniran continued to produce at an effective strike rate for the rest of the 2023 season. He scored eight goals in 18 games (950 minutes) for 0.76 goals/game, which was tied for 5th highest in MLS. His goal-scoring prowess saw multiple European clubs showing interest in Adeniran, including Rapid Vienna, Sparta Prague, Rosenborg BK and FC Ingolstadt 04.

As the 2024 season began, Adeniran started strong (two goals in first two games of the season). As the season continued, Adeniran's playing time dwindled as he began having challenges with Coach Bradley Carnell. Adeniran was held out of two games with the team, after Carnell was reportedly dissatisfied with his work rate, and trained on his own for a while.

In July 2024, after Carnell parted ways with the team, Adeniran was brought back into the first team gameday roster by interim manager, John Hackworth.

=== Philadelphia Union ===
On July 18, 2024, Adeniran was traded from St. Louis City SC to Philadelphia Union for $150,000 in General Allocation Money, plus $300,000 in additional add-ons. The Union had been tracking Adeniran since his German playing days. On July 20, 2024, he made his Union debut in a 3–0 over Nashville SC.

=== LASK ===
On December 2, 2024, Adeniran signed a 3.5-year contract with LASK in Austria, effective 1 January 2025. He achieved a domestic double with the club in the 2025–26 season. On 25 August 2026, he scored a brace, including the winner in extra time, and missed a penalty in a 5–1 victory over Celtic in the Champions League qualifying play-off, securing his club's qualification for the league phase and its first-ever participation in the competition.

== Personal life ==
Born in the United States, Adeniran is of Nigerian descent. He comes from a soccer-playing family. His father, Victor Adebesi Adeniran, formerly known as Victor Ogunsanya, played for Nigeria in the 1988 Olympics as did his uncle, Andrew Uwe. His father was also a member of the Brooklyn Italians, 1991 U.S. Open Cup champion. His brother, Ayodeji Adeniran, played with Samuel on various teams throughout their careers.

Adeniran and his two brothers and sister are the owners of VAPS Dynasty Clothing, a multidimensional custom fashion label and lifestyle brand that specializes in bespoke African and contemporary formal attire.

== Career statistics ==
As of match played November 3, 2026

Appearances and goals by club, season and competition
| Club | Season | League | | | National cup (Note: Includes U.S. Open Cup, Austrian Cup) | | Continental | | Other | | Total | |
| Club | Season | Division | Apps | Goals | Apps | Goals | Apps | Goals | Apps | Goals | Apps | Goals |
|---|---|---|---|---|---|---|---|---|---|---|---|---|
| Leganés B | 2018–19 | Segunda División B | 0 | 0 | — | | — | | — | | 0 | 0 |
| Chacarita (loan) | 2018–19 | AFA Liga Profesional de Fútbol | 0 | 0 | 0 | 0 | — | | — | | 0 | 0 |
| Guadalajara (loan) | 2018–19 | Tercera Federación | 14 | 7 | 0 | 0 | — | | — | | 14 | 7 |
| Castellón (loan) | 2018–19 | Segunda División B | 0 | 0 | — | | — | | — | | 0 | 0 |
| Kickers Emden | 2019–20 | Oberliga Niedersachsen | 13 | 6 | — | | — | | 1 (Note: Appearance in Lower Saxony Cup) | 0 | 14 | 6 |
| Atlas Delmenhorst | 2020–21 | Regionalliga Nord | 7 | 1 | — | | — | | — | | 7 | 1 |
| Tacoma Defiance | 2021 | USL Championship | 30 | 13 | — | | — | | — | | 30 | 13 |
| Seattle Sounders | 2021 | Major League Soccer | 2 | 0 | 0 | 0 | 0 | 0 | 0 | 0 | 2 | 0 |
| Seattle Sounders | 2022 | Major League Soccer | 2 | 0 | 1 | 0 | 1 (Note: Appearance in CONCACAF Champions Cup) | 0 | 0 | 0 | 4 | 0 |
| Seattle Sounders | Total | | 4 | 0 | 1 | 0 | 1 | 0 | 0 | 0 | 6 | 0 |
| Tacoma Defiance (loan) | 2022 | MLS Next Pro | 8 | 2 | — | | — | | — | | 8 | 2 |
| San Antonio (loan) | 2022 | USL Championship | 23 | 12 | 0 | 0 | — | | — | | 23 | 12 |
| St. Louis City | 2023 | Major League Soccer | 18 | 8 | 0 | 0 | — | | 4 (Note: Two appearances in Leagues Cup, two appearances in MLS Cup playoffs) | 0 | 22 | 8 |
| St. Louis City | 2024 | Major League Soccer | 17 | 2 | 0 | 0 | 2 | 0 | — | | 19 | 2 |
| St. Louis City | Total | | 35 | 10 | 0 | 0 | 2 | 0 | 4 | 0 | 41 | 10 |
| San Antonio (loan) | 2023 | USL Championship | 7 | 4 | 1 | 0 | — | | — | | 8 | 4 |
| Philadelphia Union | 2024 | Major League Soccer | 7 | 0 | 0 | 0 | — | | 7 (Note: Appearances in Leagues Cup) | 0 | 14 | 0 |
| LASK | 2024–25 | Austrian Bundesliga | 14 | 1 | 2 | 1 | 0 | 0 | — | | 16 | 2 |
| LASK | 2025–26 | Austrian Bundesliga | 29 | 9 | 5 | 5 | — | | — | | 34 | 14 |
| LASK | 2026–27 | Austrian Bundesliga | 8 | 6 | 2 | 2 | 5 (Note: Appearances in UEFA Champions League) | 3 | — | | 15 | 11 |
| LASK | Total | | 51 | 16 | 9 | 8 | 5 | 3 | — | | 65 | 27 |
| Career total | | | 197 | 71 | 11 | 8 | 8 | 3 | 11 | 0 | 227 | 82 |

== Honors ==
St. Louis City SC

- Western Conference (regular season): 2023

LASK

- Austrian Bundesliga: 2025–26
- Austrian Cup: 2025–26
