= Caden Glover =

American soccer player (born 2007)

Personal information
- Full name: Caden Edward Glover
- Date of birth: March 8, 2007 (age 19)
- Place of birth: Columbia, Illinois, U.S.
- Position: Forward

Team information
- Current team: St. Louis City
- Number: 46

Youth career
- 2021: St. Louis Scott Gallagher
- 2021–2023: St. Louis City

Senior career*
Years	Team	Apps	(Gls)
2022–	St. Louis City 2	64	(14)
2023–	St. Louis City	6	(0)
- * Club domestic league appearances and goals

Caden Edward Glover (born March 8, 2007) is an American professional soccer player who plays as a forward for Major League Soccer club St. Louis City SC. He became the first homegrown player for St. Louis, and the first MLS player born in 2007.

== Honors ==
St. Louis City SC

- Western Conference (regular season): 2023
