= John Klein (soccer, born 1999) =

American soccer player

Johnny Klein
Personal information
- Full name: John David Klein III
- Date of birth: November 7, 1999 (age 26)
- Place of birth: Kansas City, Missouri, United States
- Height: 5 ft 7 in (1.70 m)
- Position: Attacking midfielder

Team information
- Current team: Brooklyn FC
- Number: 8

Youth career
- Sporting Kansas City
- –2018: Portland Timbers

College career
Years	Team	Apps	(Gls)
2018–2022	Saint Louis Billikens	88	(29)

Senior career*
Years	Team	Apps	(Gls)
2018	Portland Timbers 2	0	(0)
2019	Chicago FC United	10	(4)
2021	St. Louis Scott Gallagher	8	(4)
2022	Kaw Valley FC	0	(0)
2023–2024	St. Louis City 2	50	(19)
2023–2024	St. Louis City	12	(1)
2025	Charleston Battery	16	(1)
2025–2026	Monterey Bay FC	15	(1)
2026–	Brooklyn FC	10	(1)
- * Club domestic league appearances and goals as of November 4, 2026

John David Klein III (born November 7, 1999) is an American professional soccer player who plays as a midfielder for USL Championship club Brooklyn FC.

== Career ==
=== Youth, college, and amateur ===
Born in Kansas City, Missouri, Klein attended Rock Bridge High School in Columbia, Missouri, where he played one year of high school soccer and was named the district's Player of the Year. He later joined the academy teams in Sporting Kansas City and Portland Timbers. With the latter, Klein signed a USL academy contract with Portland Timbers 2 but never made an appearance for the team.

In 2018, Klein attended Saint Louis University to play college soccer. Across five seasons with the Billikens, including a truncated season due to the COVID-19 pandemic, Klein made 88 appearances, scoring 29 goals and tallying 27 assists. Klein won numerous awards and accolades during his college career, including A-10 Conference Freshman of the Year in 2018, All-Conference in 2018, 2020, 2021, and 2022 and the A-10 co-Offensive Player of the Year in 2022.

While at college, Klein also spent various spells with clubs competing in the USL League Two; Chicago FC United in 2019, St. Louis Scott Gallagher SC in 2021, and Kaw Valley FC in 2022.

=== Professional ===
Following college, Klein was selected 9th overall in MASL draft by Kansas City Comets. One day later on December 21, 2022, Klein was selected 30th overall in the 2023 MLS SuperDraft by St. Louis City SC. On February 28, 2023, Klein signed a professional contract with the club's MLS Next Pro side St. Louis City 2, a club he had trained with the previous year. On May 19, 2023, Klein signed a short-term deal to join the club's Major League Soccer roster for their upcoming fixture against Sporting Kansas City. On June 22, 2024, St. Louis Klein's move to the first team permanent. Klein was released by St. Louis on October 22, 2024, following their 2024 season.

On January 10, 2025, the Charleston Battery of the USL Championship announced they had signed Klein. On August 5, 2025, Klein was transferred to USL Championship side Monterey Bay FC.

On May 15, 2026 Brooklyn FC announced they had acquired Klein via transfer from Monterey Bay FC.

== Personal ==
He is the son of former professional soccer player and current coach John Klein.
