= Nicholas Gioacchini =

American soccer player (born 2000)

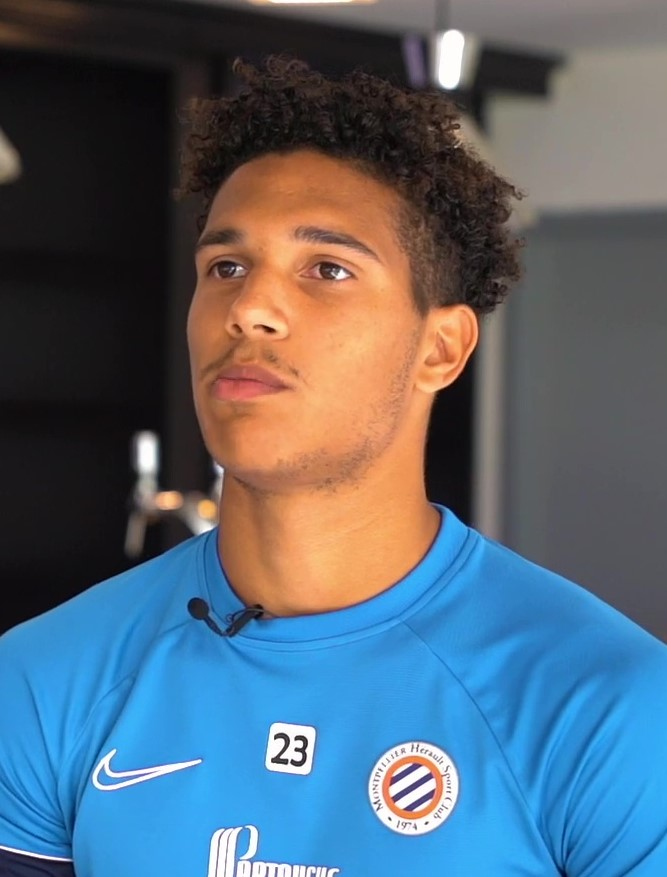
- Gioacchini with Montpellier in 2021

Personal information
- Full name: Nicholas Selson Gioacchini
- Date of birth: July 25, 2000 (age 26)
- Place of birth: Kansas City, Missouri, U.S.
- Height: 6 ft 0 in (1.83 m)
- Positions: Forward; winger

Team information
- Current team: Sabadell
- Number: 16

Youth career
- 2015–2017: Paris FC

Senior career*
| Years | Team | Apps | (Gls) |
| 2017–2018 | Paris FC B | 6 | (2) |
| 2018–2019 | Caen B | 22 | (7) |
| 2019–2022 | Caen | 49 | (6) |
| 2021 | Caen B | 1 | (0) |
| 2021–2022 | → Montpellier B (loan) | 3 | (4) |
| 2021–2022 | → Montpellier (loan) | 28 | (0) |
| 2022 | Orlando City | 6 | (0) |
| 2022 | Orlando City B | 1 | (0) |
| 2023 | St. Louis City | 34 | (10) |
| 2024–2025 | Como | 9 | (0) |
| 2024 | → FC Cincinnati (loan) | 8 | (0) |
| 2025–2026 | Asteras Tripolis | 30 | (2) |
| 2026– | Sabadell | 4 | (3) |

International career^{‡}
| 2020–2021 | United States | 8 | (3) |
Medal record
Representing United States
| Winner | CONCACAF Gold Cup | 2021 |
- * Club domestic league appearances and goals as of 21:44, 12 September 2026 (UTC) ‡ National team caps and goals as of August 1, 2021

Nicholas Selson Gioacchini (born July 25, 2000) is an American professional soccer player who plays as a forward or a winger for Segunda División club Sabadell.

== Early life and youth soccer ==
Gioacchini was born in Kansas City, Missouri, to an Italian father and Jamaican mother. He played for Blue Valley Soccer Club when he was young as well as for the Orange Stars. He moved to Parma, Italy at the age of 8. He returned to the United States at the age of 12. The family settled in Bethesda, Maryland, and he played for Bethesda Soccer Club, Cerritos Soccer Academy, D.C. United Academy, Olney Soccer Club, and ESSA Soccer Academy.

== Club career ==
At the age of 15, Gioacchini moved with his family to France. He joined Paris FC in 2015. On May 14, 2018, Gioacchini signed a two-year contract with Caen. He made his debut for Caen in a 4–2 Ligue 2 win over his former club Paris FC on October 25, 2019, scoring his side's first goal in the 25th minute. He scored another goal against Nancy on December 2, 2019.

On July 20, 2022, it was announced Gioacchini had signed a two-and-a-half-year contract, plus an option for another year, with Orlando City of Major League Soccer. On November 11, he was selected by St. Louis City in the 2022 MLS Expansion Draft ahead of their inaugural season in MLS.

On January 24, 2024, Gioacchini joined Italian club Como for an undisclosed fee, signing a three-year-and-a-half contract. On August 15, he was loaned to FC Cincinnati throughout the rest of the 2024 MLS season.

On January 26, 2025, Gioacchini signed with Asteras Tripolis in Greece. On August 17, 2026, he joined Segunda División side CE Sabadell.

== International career ==
Before being cap-tied to the United States, Gioacchini was also eligible to play for Italy and Jamaica. He received his first call up to the senior United States squad for matches against Wales and Panama in November 2020. Gioacchini made his debut for the senior team as a late substitute against Wales on November 12, 2020. He started the next match which was against Panama on November 16, scoring two goals despite missing a penalty in a 6–2 friendly victory.

Gioacchini was named to the United States roster for the 2021 CONCACAF Gold Cup.

== Career statistics ==
=== Club ===
As of match played November 9, 2024

Appearances and goals by club, season and competition
| Club | Season | League | | | National cup (Note: Includes Coupe de France, U.S. Open Cup, Greek Cup) | | League cup (Note: Includes Leagues Cup) | | Other (Note: Includes MLS Cup playoffs) | | Total | |
| Club | Season | Division | Apps | Goals | Apps | Goals | Apps | Goals | Apps | Goals | Apps | Goals |
|---|---|---|---|---|---|---|---|---|---|---|---|---|
| Paris FC B | 2017–18 | Championnat National 3 | 6 | 2 | — | | — | | — | | 6 | 2 |
| Caen B | 2018–19 | Championnat National 3 | 18 | 5 | — | | — | | — | | 18 | 5 |
| Caen B | 2019–20 | Championnat National 3 | 4 | 2 | — | | — | | — | | 4 | 2 |
| Caen B | Total | | 22 | 7 | — | | — | | — | | 22 | 7 |
| Caen | 2019–20 | Ligue 2 | 16 | 2 | 2 | 2 | — | | — | | 18 | 4 |
| Caen | 2020–21 | Ligue 2 | 30 | 4 | 2 | 1 | — | | — | | 32 | 5 |
| Caen | 2021–22 | Ligue 2 | 3 | 0 | — | | — | | — | | 3 | 0 |
| Caen | Total | | 49 | 6 | 4 | 3 | — | | — | | 53 | 9 |
| Montpellier B (loan) | 2021–22 | Championnat National 2 | 3 | 4 | — | | — | | — | | 3 | 4 |
| Montpellier (loan) | 2021–22 | Ligue 1 | 28 | 0 | 3 | 0 | — | | — | | 31 | 0 |
| Orlando City | 2022 | MLS | 6 | 0 | 1 | 0 | — | | — | | 7 | 0 |
| Orlando City B | 2022 | MLS Next Pro | 1 | 0 | — | | — | | — | | 1 | 0 |
| St. Louis City | 2023 | MLS | 32 | 10 | 1 | 0 | 2 | 0 | 2 | 0 | 37 | 10 |
| Como | 2023–24 | Serie B | 9 | 0 | — | | — | | — | | 9 | 0 |
| FC Cincinnati (loan) | 2024 | MLS | 8 | 0 | — | | — | | 1 | 0 | 9 | 0 |
| Asteras Tripolis | 2024–25 | Super League Greece | 0 | 0 | 1 | 0 | 0 | 0 | 0 | 0 | 1 | 0 |
| Career total | | | 163 | 29 | 10 | 3 | 2 | 0 | 3 | 0 | 178 | 32 |

=== International ===
As of August 1, 2021

Appearances and goals by national team and year
| National Team | Year | Apps | Goals |
|---|---|---|---|
| United States | 2020 | 2 | 2 |
| United States | 2021 | 6 | 1 |
| Total | | 8 | 3 |

As of July 15, 2021
Scores and results list United States' goal tally first, score column indicates score after each Gioacchini goal.

List of international goals scored by Nicholas Gioacchini
| No. | Date | Venue | Opponent | Score | Result | Competition |
|---|---|---|---|---|---|---|
| 1 | November 16, 2020 | Stadion Wiener Neustadt, Wiener Neustadt, Austria | Panama | 2–1 | 6–2 | Friendly |
| 2 | November 16, 2020 | Stadion Wiener Neustadt, Wiener Neustadt, Austria | Panama | 3–1 | 6–2 | Friendly |
| 3 | July 15, 2021 | Children's Mercy Park, Kansas City, United States | Martinique | 6–1 | 6–1 | 2021 CONCACAF Gold Cup |

== Honors ==
Orlando City

- U.S. Open Cup: 2022

St. Louis City SC

- Western Conference (regular season): 2023

United States

- CONCACAF Gold Cup: 2021
