= St. Louis City 2 =

Reserve team of St Louis City SC

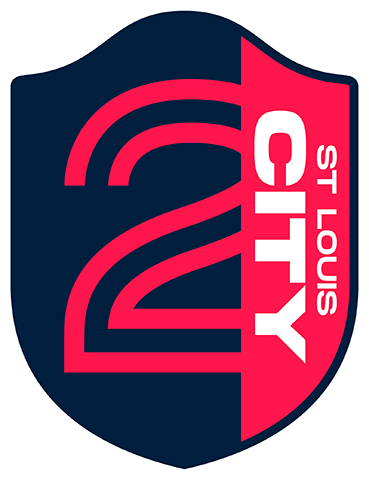
- Full name: St. Louis City Soccer Club 2
- Founded: December 6, 2021; 4 years ago
- Stadium: Energizer Park; St. Louis, Missouri
- Capacity: 22,423
- Owners: Carolyn Kindle; Jo Ann Taylor Kindle; Jim Kavanaugh
- Chairman: Carolyn Kindle
- Sporting director: Corey Wray
- Coach: David Critchley
- League: MLS Next Pro
- 2025: 1st, Western Conference; Playoffs: Conference Semifinals
- Website: stlcitysc.com/city2
Home colors	Away colors

St. Louis City 2, often shortened to City2 (stylized as CITY2), is an American professional soccer team located in St. Louis, Missouri. It is the reserve team of St. Louis City SC and participates in MLS Next Pro. The team plays its home games at Energizer Park, home of St. Louis City SC in St. Louis, Missouri.

== History ==
On December 6, 2021, St. Louis City SC announced the formation of a reserve team in MLS Next Pro that would begin play in the 2022 season.

It was announced on January 14, 2022, that St. Louis City SC's director of coaching, John Hackworth, would serve as the interim head coach for the MLS Next Pro side. At the conclusion of the MLS Next Academy season, it was announced that academy head coach Andreas Schumacher would take over as head coach of the side. St. Louis local and Bosnian American Elvir Kafedžić was also announced as an assistant coach.

== Players and staff ==
=== Roster ===
Note: Flags indicate national team as defined under FIFA eligibility rules; some limited exceptions apply. Players may hold more than one non-FIFA nationality.

No.	Pos.	Nation	Player
26	MF	USA	Cooper Forcellini
34	GK	USA	Colin Welsh
41	DF	JAM	Chris Pearson
42	FW	USA	Palmer Ault
43	DF	PUR	Sidney Paris
44	MF	USA	Jack Wagoner
45	FW	USA	Chidube Nwankwo
48	DF	USA	Riley Lynch
49	FW	USA	Nighte Pickering
50	GK	USA	Nate Martinez
51	GK	USA	Brady Cochrane
52	GK	USA	Lucas McPartlin
53	DF	USA	Stone Marion

No.	Pos.	Nation	Player
54	MF	ENG	Adeteye Gbadehan
57	DF	USA	Owen Jorgensen
62	DF	JAM	Jemone Barclay
63	MF	USA	Trip Clancy
66	DF	USA	Zack Lillington
68	MF	USA	Alex Jundt
73	MF	USA	Evan Carlock
79	DF	USA	Emiliano Chavez
83	MF	USA	Lorenzo Cornelius
85	MF	JPN	Yu Ota
88	MF	USA	Patrick McDonald
90	MF	USA	Eddie Niles
98	DF	TTO	Andrew De Gannes

Signed to first team contract with St. Louis City SC
Signed to academy team contract with St. Louis City SC Academy

=== Staff ===
As of January 6, 2026.

Executive
Sporting director	Corey Wray
Technical
Head coach	David Critchley
Assistant coach	Elvir Kafedžić
Goalkeeper coach	Tim Kelly
Performance coach	Peter Alston
Head Athletic trainer	Zach Hopkins
Equipment manager	Nelson Hernandez
Player relations manager	Tommy Driscoll

== Team records ==
=== Year-by-year ===
As of December 17, 2025

Season	MLS Next Pro												Playoffs	USOC	Top Scorer	
Season	P	W	D	L	GF	GA	GD	Pts	PPG	Div.	Conf.	Overall	Playoffs	USOC	Player	Goals
2022	24	15	3	6	51	34	+17	49	2.04	1st	1st	2nd	Cup Final	R3	(England) Josh Dolling	8
2023	28	11	9	8	49	39	+10	47	1.68	4th	5th	9th	Round of 16	Did not play	(United States) John Klein III	13
2024	28	17	4	7	53	35	+18	56	2.00	2nd	2nd	2nd	Semifinals	Did not play	(United States) Mykhi Joyner	18
2025	28	17	6	5	60	37	+23	62	2.21	1st	1st	1st	Semifinals	Did not play	(United States) Mykhi Joyner	15

=== Head coaches record ===
As of January 6, 2026

- Includes regular season, playoff, and U.S. Open Cup games.

Name	Nationality	From	To	P	W	D	L	GF	GA	Win%
John Hackworth	United States	January 14, 2022	January 23, 2023	30	18	4	8	58	42	60.00
Bobby Murphy	United States	January 23, 2023	November 14, 2024	60	30	13	17	108	82	50.00
David Critchley	England	November 14, 2024	May 27, 2025	11	6	1	4	20	18	54.55
John Hackworth (interim)	United States	May 27, 2025	December 5, 2025	19	12	5	2	43	21	63.16
David Critchley	England	January 6, 2026	Present	28	10	10	8	42	40	35.71

== Honors ==
National
Competitions	Titles	Seasons
MLS Next Pro (Regular Season)	1	2025
Western Conference	2	2022, 2025
Western Conference (Playoffs)	1	2022
Western Conference Frontier Division	2	2022, 2025

== See also ==
- St. Louis City SC
- Soccer in St. Louis
