= 2026 North Texas SC season =

North Texas SC
2026 season
- Owner: FC Dallas (Clark and Dan Hunt)
- Chairman: Matt Denny
- Head coach: John Gall
- Stadium: Texas Health Mansfield Stadium
- MLSNP: Frontier Division: 4t Western Conference: 1st MLSNP: 1st
- Top goalscorer: League: (Belgium) Edu Nys (10 Goals); All: (Belgium) Edu Nys (10 Goals)
- Highest home attendance: 5,694 vs St. Louis City 2 July 4
- Lowest home attendance: 1,288 vs Colorado Rapids 2 March 7
- Average home league attendance: 2,836 (3 missing), 1,382 in Arlington (3 missing), 3,159 in Mansfield
- Biggest win: North Texas SC 5–1 Sporting Kansas City II May 16
- Biggest defeat: Ventura County FC 6–1 North Texas SC August 8
Home colors	Away colors
- All statistics correct as of 07:28, January 7, 2026 (UTC).

The 2026 North Texas SC season is the club's eighth season. The first three seasons North Texas SC competed in USL League One, including the inaugural 2019 season. North Texas SC was the inaugural champions in USL League One. In December 2021, North Texas SC announced that they would compete in the inaugural MLS Next Pro season, a new division three league in American soccer. They are the Defending League Champions. This season they will move to Texas Health Mansfield Stadium in Mansfield, Texas in 2026.

== Current roster ==
As of February 28, 2026

No.	Pos.	Nation	Player
4	DF	PUR	Ian Charles
6	MF	ITA	Umberto Pelà
8	MF	NGR	Favour Aroyameh
10	MF	BEL	Edu Nys
11	MF	TTO	Nathaniel James
12	DF	USA	Jonah Bigger
13	GK	USA	Erik Dymora
16	MF	JAM	Nicholas Simmonds
18	MF	USA	Tommy Ospina
19	MF	FRA	Marlon Luccin
20	MF	HON	Jaidyn Contreras
21	DF	USA	Zach Molomo
22	DF	BRA	Álvaro Augusto
23	FW	USA	Samuel Sedeh
24	DF	USA	Josh Torquato
25	DF	USA	Jonah Gibson
26	DF	USA	Slade Starnes
27	MF	USA	Caleb Swann
29	DF	USA	Enzo Newman
31	GK	USA	Thomas Burchfield
36	FW	POL	Daniel Baran
43	GK	USA	Aiden Jordan
46	DF	USA	Isaiah Kaakoush
50	MF	USA	Diego Garcia
55	DF	USA	Wyatt Easterly
57	GK	COL	Nico Montoya
59	MF	USA	Christopher Salazar

Signed to first team contract with FC Dallas.
FC Dallas Academy player.

== Transfers ==
=== In ===
Date	Position	No.	Name	From	transaction	Fee	Ref.
January 5, 2026	GK	31	(United States) Thomas Burchfield	(United States) Austin FC Academy	signing	N/A	
January 14, 2026	MF	45	(Puerto Rico) Ian Charles	(United States) UCLA Bruins	signing	N/A	
January 23, 2026	MF	11	(Trinidad and Tobago) Nathaniel James	(United States) Portland Hearts of Pine	signing	N/A	
February 9, 2026	MF	10	(Belgium) Edouard Nys	(United States) UIC Flames	signing	N/A	
February 10, 2026	GK	13	(United States) Eryk Dymora	(United States) Duke Blue Devils	signing	N/A	
February 16, 2026	MF	6	(Italy) Umberto Pelà	(United States) Virginia Cavaliers	signing	N/A	
February 25, 2026	DF	12	(United States) Jonah Biggar	(United States) South Carolina Gamecocks	signing	N/A	
February 27, 2026	MF	18	(United States) Timothy Ospina	(United States) Kansas City Roos	signing	N/A	
February 28, 2026	DF	25	(United States) Jonah Gibson	(United States) FC Dallas Academy	signing	N/A	
March 24, 2026	DF	14	(Brazil) Leandro Gonçalves	(Brazil) São Caetano	signing	N/A	
April 19, 2026	DF	55	(United States) Wyatt Easterly	(United States) FC Dallas Academy	signing	N/A	
June 6, 2026	FW	30	(United States) Da'vian Kimbrough	(United States) Sacramento Republic FC	Loan	N/A	
July 17, 2026	MF		(Brazil) Lucas Martins	(Brazil) São Caetano	Signing	N/A	

=== Out ===
Date	Position	No.	Name	To	Type	Fee	Ref.
January 5, 2026	DF	5	(New Zealand) James Bulkeley	(United States) [[]]	Option Declined	N/A	
January 5, 2026	FW	9	(Argentina) Gianluca Cangiano	(United States) [[]]	Option Declined	N/A	
January 5, 2026	DF	4	(Mali) Mohamed Cisset	(United States) Atlanta United 2	Option Declined	N/A	
January 5, 2026	DF	3	(United States) Gavin Gall	(United States) [[]]	Option Declined	N/A	
January 5, 2026	GK	1	(United States) JT Harms	(United States) Forward Madison FC	Option Declined	N/A	
January 5, 2026	MF	79	(United States) Leo Orejarena	(United States) FC Cincinnati 2	Option Declined	N/A	
January 5, 2026	FW	10	(Liberia) Faisu Sangare	(United States) [[]]	Option Declined	N/A	
January 5, 2026	MF	6	(Ghana) Aaron Essel	(Scotland) St. Johnstone	Loan Expired	N/A	
January 5, 2026	DF	18	(United States) Jackson DuBois	(United States) New Mexico United	Loan Expired	N/A	
January 5, 2026	DF	25	(United States) Kaka Scabin	(United States) FC Dallas	Signed to a homegrown contract	N/A	
January 5, 2026	MF	17	(Honduras) Jaidyn Contreras	(United States) FC Dallas	Signed to a homegrown contract	N/A	
January 5, 2026	MF	23	(United States) Caleb Swann	(United States) FC Dallas	Signed to a homegrown contract	N/A	
January 5, 2026	FW	11	(United States) Sam Sarver	(United States) FC Dallas	Signed to the first team	N/A	

== Non-competitive fixtures ==
=== Preseason ===
January 31	North Texas SC	8–1	Foro SC	Frisco, Texas
7:00 PM CST	Trialist 5 10'; Baran 21' (pen.); Trialist 4 37'; Sedeh 52', 76', 83', 88'; Flowers 74'		17'	Stadium: Toyota Soccer Center

February 4	North Texas SC	4–1	TenFifteen FC	Frisco, Texas
6:00 PM CST	Salazar 61'; Contreras 69'; James 75'; Baran 78'		72'	Stadium: Toyota Soccer Center

February 7	FC Tulsa	3–0	North Texas SC	Tulsa, Oklahoma
3:00 PM CST	57'; 69'; 87'			Stadium: ONEOK Field

February 11	North Texas SC	7–0	Sporting NTX	Frisco, Texas
6:30 PM CST	Trialist 3 7'; Sedeh 30'; Luccin 33'; Trialist 6 48'; Molomo 49'; Baran 64', 87'			Stadium: Toyota Soccer Center

February 14	North Texas SC	Cancelled	Houston Christian Huskies	Frisco, Texas
10:00 AM CST	Luccin 16'			Stadium: Field 4

February 21	North Texas SC	2–1	SMU Mustangs	Frisco, Texas
7:30 PM CST	Simmonds 21'; James 80'		59'	Stadium: Toyota Soccer Center

== Competitive fixtures ==
=== League ===
March 1 1	Real Monarchs	2–2 (4–3 p)	North Texas SC	Herriman, Utah
4:30 PM CST	Wentzel (yellow card) 38'; Barea 55'; Marquez (yellow card) 59'; Villa (yellow card) 82'; Rodrigues dos Santos 89'; Calderón (yellow card) 90+3'	Report	Nys 40' (yellow card) 86'; Simmonds 83'	Stadium: Zions Bank Stadium; Referee: Robert Vincze
	Penalties
	Zambrano (penalty scored); Calderón (penalty scored); Rodrigues dos Santos (penalty scored); Barea (penalty scored)		(penalty missed) Baran; (penalty scored) Simmonds; (penalty scored) Aroyameh; (penalty scored) Luccin; (penalty missed) Nys

March 7 2	North Texas SC	3–1	Colorado Rapids 2	Arlington, Texas
7:30 PM CST	Biggar (yellow card) 18'; Nys 24', 42', 66'; Contreras (yellow card) 38'; Starnes (yellow card) 45+1'	Report	Harper (yellow card) 10'; Copeland (yellow card) 36'; Aquino 45+2'; Thomas (yellow card) 61'; Wathuta (yellow card) 64'	Stadium: Choctaw Stadium; Attendance: 1,288; Referee: Muhammad Kaleia

March 15 3	Austin FC II	1–0	North Texas SC	Austin, Texas
7:30 PM CST	Ruszel (yellow card) 14'; Burton (yellow card) 31'; Barro 38'; Thomas (yellow card) 52'; Dănciuțiu (yellow card) 76'; Barro (yellow card) 90+3'	Report	Starnes (yellow card) 19'; Torquato (yellow card) 33' (yellow-red card) 58'; Garcia (yellow card) 43'; Nys (yellow card) 69'	Stadium: Parmer Field; Referee: Stefan Perri

March 21 4	Houston Dynamo 2	2–0	North Texas SC	Houston, Texas
4:00 PM CST	Bell (yellow card) 14'; Mwakutuya (yellow card) 36'; Gonzalez 48'; Rivera 53'; Dohmann (yellow card) 62'	Report	Ospina (yellow card) 23'; Dymora (yellow card) 80'	Stadium: SaberCats Stadium; Referee: Luis Diego Arroyo

April 4 5	Sporting KC II	1–4	North Texas SC	Kansas City, Missouri
7:00 PM CST	Haas 82'	Report	James 34', 43'; Nys 40'; Garcia (yellow card) 49'; Ospina (yellow card) 65' (goal) 90+1'	Stadium: Victory Field at Swope Soccer Village; Referee: Ryan Homik

April 10 6	North Texas SC	2–2 (5–4 p)	Sporting KC II	Arlington, Texas
7:30 PM CST	James 3', 77'; Luccin (yellow card) 28'; Ospina (yellow card) 84'	Report	Rodríguez 40'; Quintero (yellow card) 44'; Ikoba 90+1'	Stadium: Choctaw Stadium; Referee: Joe Surgan
	Penalties
	Contreras (penalty scored); Salazar (penalty scored); Nys (penalty scored); Newman (penalty scored); Torquato (penalty scored)		(penalty scored) Ikoba; (penalty scored) Derksen; (penalty scored) Francis; (penalty missed) Mabie; (penalty scored) Russo

April 19 7	Portland Timbers 2	2–2 (3–5 p)	North Texas SC	Portland, Oregon
3:00 PM CST	Guerra 53'; Fernandez-Kim (yellow card) 57'; Santos 62' (pen.); Bamford (yellow card) 65'	Report	Bigger (yellow card) 6'; Lund 26' (o.g.); Contreras (yellow card) 49'; Nys 82'	Stadium: Providence Park; Referee: Ivan De Cristofaro
	Penalties
	Guerra (penalty missed); Cervantes (penalty scored); Lund (penalty scored); Enriquez (penalty scored)		(penalty scored) Baran; (penalty scored) Salazar; (penalty scored) Nys; (penalty scored) James; (penalty scored) Torquato

April 26 8	Minnesota United FC 2	1–0	North Texas SC	St. Paul, Minnesota
3:00 PM CST	Fitz 74'; Saidi (yellow card) 89'	Report	Biggar (yellow card) 17' (yellow-red card) 90+5'	Stadium: Allianz Field; Referee: Stephen Foster

May 2 9	North Texas SC	0–2	Austin FC II	Arlington, Texas
7:30 PM CST	Louis (yellow card) 22'	Report	Alastuey 9' (yellow card) 52'; Barro (yellow card) 18'; Burton 45+1' (yellow card) 56'; Gonçalves (yellow card) 82'	Stadium: Choctaw Stadium; Attendance: 1,476; Referee: Deny Kulasinac

May 9 10	Minnesota United FC 2	0–2	North Texas SC	Blaine, Minnesota
7:00 PM CST	Dang (yellow card) 71'; Tarnue (yellow card) 89'	Report	Ospina (yellow card) 16' (yellow-red card) 66'; Newman 26'; Louis 42'	Stadium: National Sports Center; Referee: Carlos Rodriguez

May 16 11	North Texas SC	5–1	Sporting KC II	Arlington, Texas
7:30 PM CST	Nys 12'; Simmonds (yellow card) 41'; James 44', 50', 69'; Louis (yellow card) 45+2'; Baran 80'	Report	Hines 22'; Ortiz (yellow card) 30'; Lurot (yellow card) 41'	Stadium: Choctaw Stadium; Referee: Jose Landa Jr.

May 23 12	North Texas SC	2–2 (2–4 p)	San Jose Earthquakes II	Arlington, Texas
7:30 PM CST	Nys (yellow card) 59' (goal) 89'; Charles (yellow card) 62'; James 66'; Contreras (yellow card) 90+2'	Report	Spivey 19'; Allen 71'; Baptista (yellow card) 75'; de Flores (yellow card) 82'; Cano (yellow card) 90+2'	Stadium: Choctaw Stadium; Referee: Edgar Garcia
	Penalties
	Baran (penalty scored); Salazar (penalty scored); Contreras (penalty missed); Garcia (penalty missed)		(penalty scored) Donnery; (penalty scored) Mendoza; (penalty scored) Baptista; (penalty scored) Serra

May 30 13	St. Louis City 2	2–0	North Texas SC	St Louis, Missouri
4:00 PM CST	De Gannes (yellow card) 33'; Gonçalves 48' (o.g.); Joyner 64'; Wagoner (yellow card) 89'	Report	Charles (yellow card) 47'	Stadium: Energizer Park; Referee: Corbyn May

June 10 14	Whitecaps FC 2	1–1 (4–3 p)	North Texas SC	Burnaby, British Columbia
8:00 PM CST	Mathe (yellow card) 33'; Badwal (yellow card) 67'; Bejaoui (yellow card) 76'; Bruletti (yellow card) 82'; Munn 90+2'; Garnette (yellow card) 90+4'	Report	Ospina (yellow card) 38'; Contreras 48' (yellow card) 58'; Charles (yellow card) 88'	Stadium: Swangard Stadium; Referee: Cody Baldauf
	Penalties
	Ittycheria (penalty scored); Amponsah (penalty scored); Popović (penalty scored); Rassak (penalty missed); Bruletti (penalty scored)		(penalty scored) Salazar; (penalty scored) Pelà; (penalty scored) Contreras; (penalty missed) Charles; (penalty missed) Nys

July 4 15	North Texas SC	3–0	St. Louis City 2	Mansfield, Texas
7:45 PM CST	Starnes (yellow card) 9'; Swann (yellow card) 14' (goal) 72'; Louis 53', 90+3' (yellow card) 90+4'	Report	Gbadehan (yellow card) 30'	Stadium: Mansfield Stadium; Attendance: 5,694; Referee: Muhammad Kaleia

July 11 16	Colorado Rapids 2	1–0	North Texas SC	Denver, Colorado
7:00 PM CST	Tchoumba (yellow card) 22'; Cameron 90' (yellow card) 90+2'; Campagnolo (yellow card) 90+2'	Report	Starnes (yellow card) 46'; Gonçalves (yellow card) 53'; Ospina (yellow card) 53'	Stadium: CIBER Field at the University of Denver Soccer Stadium; Referee: Taylor Bowen

July 18 17	San Jose Earthquakes II	0–1	North Texas SC	Seaside, California
9:00 PM CT	Dossmann (yellow card) 28'; Mendoza (yellow card) 45+1'; Heisner (yellow card) 53'	Report	Newman 71'; Louis (yellow card) 90+3'; Gonçalves (yellow card) 90+4'	Stadium: Cardinale Stadium; Referee: Trevor Wiseman

July 25 18	North Texas SC	2–2 (1–4 p)	Los Angeles FC 2	Mansfield, Texas
7:45 PM CST	Charles (yellow card) 37'; Nys (yellow card) 45+10' (goal) 53'; Simmonds 90+3' (pen.)	Report	Díaz 19'; Kosakoff 22'; Rodriguez (yellow card) 45+5'; Santiago (yellow card) 88'	Stadium: Mansfield Stadium; Attendance: 3,325; Referee: Justin St. Pierre
	Penalties
	Simmonds (penalty scored); Newman (penalty missed); Baran (penalty missed)		(penalty scored) Guerra; (penalty scored) Nava; (penalty scored) Mihalić; (penalty scored) Kosakoff

July 31 19	Ventura County FC	6–1	North Texas SC	Thousand Oaks, California
6:00 PM CST	Placias 11', 40'; Preston 15', 53'; Villatoro 86'; Müller 90+2'	Report	Simmonds 52'; Luccin (yellow card) 61'; Augusto (yellow card) 81'	Stadium: William Rolland Stadium; Referee: Jay Schlesinger

August 8 20	North Texas SC	3–1	Tacoma Defiance	Mansfield, Texas
7:45 PM CST	Gonçalves (yellow card) 43'; Starnes 69'; Baran 72'; Kimbrough 90+2'	Report	Gnaulati 50'; Robles (yellow card) 57'; Shour (yellow card) 71'; Brown (yellow card) 90+5'	Stadium: Mansfield Stadium; Attendance: 3,298; Referee: Laadi Issaka

August 15 21	North Texas SC	0–3	Portland Timbers 2	Mansfield, Texas
7:45 PM CST	Ospina (yellow card) 75'	Report	Cervantes 32' (yellow card) 42'; Jura (yellow card) 45+4'; Izoita 57'; VanVoorhis (yellow card) 77'; Kissel 90+8'	Stadium: Mansfield Stadium; Attendance: 3,548; Referee: Reyes Vargas

August 19 22	North Texas SC	0–0 (3–1 p)	Austin FC II	Mansfield, Texas
7:45 PM CST	Vejrostek (yellow card) 29'; Martins (yellow card) 60' (yellow-red card) 63'; Louis (yellow card) 67'	Report	Watt (yellow card) 55'; Bery (yellow card) 55'; Cayelli (yellow card) 67'	Stadium: Mansfield Stadium; Attendance: 1,658; Referee: William Hale
	Penalties
	Nys (penalty missed); Simmonds (penalty scored); James (penalty scored); Ospina (penalty scored)		(penalty scored) Barro; (penalty missed) Dobrijevic; (penalty missed) Dǎnciuțiu; (penalty missed) Abarca

August 22 23	North Texas SC	1–1 (5–4 p)	Minnesota United FC 2	Mansfield, Texas
7:45 PM CST	Louis 45+4' (yellow card) 61'; Augusto (yellow card) 90'	Report	Tarnue 27'; Rizvanovich (yellow card) 45+4'; Pechota (yellow card) 49'; Farris (yellow card) 68'; Dang (yellow card) 90+2'	Stadium: Mansfield Stadium; Attendance: 3,152; Referee: Josue Meneses
	Penalties
	James (penalty scored); Nys (penalty scored); Ospina (penalty scored); Swann (penalty scored); Newman (penalty scored)		(penalty scored) Clarkson; (penalty missed) Farris; (penalty scored) Friedman; (penalty scored) Adebayo-Smith; (penalty scored) Pechota

August 28 24	St. Louis City 2	1–1 (7–8 p)	North Texas SC	St Louis, Missouri
7:00 PM CST	Paris 37'; Jorgensen (yellow card) 43'; Clancy III (yellow card) 56'	Report	Martins (yellow card) 35'; Baran (yellow card) 44'; Simmonds 45+4' (yellow card) 83'; Augusto (yellow card) 88'	Stadium: Energizer Park; Referee: Jacob Larson
	Penalties
	Lillington (penalty scored); Barclay (penalty scored); Pickering (penalty scored); Pearson (penalty scored); Jundt (penalty scored); Paris (penalty scored); Ota (penalty scored); Wagoner (penalty missed); Jorgensen (penalty missed)		(penalty scored) Simmonds; (penalty scored) Nys; (penalty scored) Ospina; (penalty scored) García; (penalty scored) Newman; (penalty scored) Charles; (penalty scored) Gonçalves; (penalty missed) Starnes; (penalty scored) Flowers

September 4 25	North Texas SC	4–1	Real Monarchs	Mansfield, Texas
7:45 PM CST	Simmonds 48'; Garcia 57'; Gonçalves (yellow card) 63'; Swann 65'; Augusto 83'; Charles (yellow card) 87'	Report	Ream 5'; Riquelme (yellow card) 17'; Mesalles (yellow card) 38'; Murphy (yellow card) 74'	Stadium: Mansfield Stadium; Attendance: 2,878; Referee: Katja Koroleva

September 9 26	North Texas SC	2–3	Houston Dynamo 2	Mansfield, Texas
7:45 PM CST	Simmonds 14' (pen.); Swann (yellow card) 38'; Nys 75' (yellow card) 76'; Augusto (yellow card) 90+7'	Report	Sousa 30' (yellow card) 31' (yellow card) 52' (yellow-red card); Mohammad 90+1'; Brummett (yellow card) 90+7' (goal) 90+11'	Stadium: Mansfield Stadium; Attendance: 1,786; Referee: Kaitlyn Trowbridge

September 13 27	North Texas SC	0–0 (4–3 p)	Houston Dynamo 2	Mansfield, Texas
7:30 PM CST	Starnes (yellow card) 24'	Report	Mohammad (yellow card) 69'; Silva (yellow card) 75'	Stadium: Mansfield Stadium; Attendance: 3,096; Referee: Erick Lezama Pavon
	Penalties
	Simmonds (penalty scored); Luccin (penalty scored); Pelà (penalty scored); Charles (penalty scored)		(penalty scored) Rivera; (penalty scored) André; (penalty scored) Walsh; (penalty missed) Herrera; (penalty missed) Betancourt

September 20 28	Colorado Rapids 2	2–1	North Texas SC	Denver, Colorado
4:00 PM CST	De La Fuente 38'; Stewart-Baynes (yellow card) 58'; Heredia 61'; Rinaldi (yellow card) 74'; Fadal (yellow card) 90'	Report	Charles (yellow card) 81'; Starnes 85'	Stadium: CIBER Field at the University of Denver Soccer Stadium; Referee: Patricia McCracken

== Statistics ==
Numbers after plus-sign(+) denote appearances as a substitute.

=== Appearances and goals ===
No.	Pos	Nat	Player	Total		MLS Next Pro		MLSNP Playoffs	
No.	Pos	Nat	Player	Apps	Goals	Apps	Goals	Apps	Goals
1	GK	(United States) USA	Brooks Thompson	1	0	1+0	0	0+0	0
4	DF	(Puerto Rico) PUR	Ian Charles	17	0	9+8	0	0+0	0
6	MF	(Italy) ITA	Umberto Pelà	6	0	0+6	0	0+0	0
8	MF	(Nigeria) NGR	Favour Aroyameh	6	0	0+6	0	0+0	0
10	MF	(Belgium) BEL	Edouard Nys	28	10	28+0	10	0+0	0
11	MF	(Trinidad and Tobago) TTO	Nathaniel James	26	8	21+5	8	0+0	0
12	DF	(United States) USA	Jonah Biggar	10	0	7+3	0	0+0	0
13	GK	(United States) USA	Eryk Dymora	20	0	20+0	0	0+0	0
14	DF	(Brazil) BRA	Leandro Gonçalves	19	0	12+7	0	0+0	0
15	FW	(Haiti) HAI	Ricky Louis	19	4	18+1	4	0+0	0
16	FW	(Jamaica) JAM	Nicholas Simmonds	14	6	13+1	6	0+0	0
17	DF	(United States) USA	Zach Molomo	1	0	0+1	0	0+0	0
18	FW	(United States) USA	Tommy Ospina	21	1	17+4	1	0+0	0
19	MF	(France) FRA	Marlon Luccin	17	0	6+11	0	0+0	0
20	MF	(Honduras) HON	Jaidyn Contreras	14	1	8+6	1	0+0	0
21	MF	(Mexico) MEX	Benji Flowers	10	0	1+9	0	0+0	0
22	DF	(Brazil) BRA	Álvaro Augusto	17	1	17+0	1	0+0	0
23	FW	(United States) USA	Samuel Sedeh	13	0	3+10	0	0+0	0
24	DF	(United States) USA	Josh Torquato	12	0	12+0	0	0+0	0
25	DF	(United States) USA	Jonah Gibson	12	0	6+6	0	0+0	0
26	DF	(United States) USA	Slade Starnes	24	2	24+0	2	0+0	0
27	MF	(United States) USA	Caleb Swann	14	2	14+0	2	0+0	0
29	MF	(United States) USA	Enzo Newman	24	2	22+2	2	0+0	0
30	FW	(United States) USA	Da'vian Kimbrough	7	1	2+5	1	0+0	0
31	GK	(United States) USA	Thomas Burchfield	0	0	0+0	0	0+0	0
32	DF	(Brazil) BRA	Lucas Martins	8	0	6+2	0	0+0	0
36	FW	(Poland) POL	Daniel Baran	18	2	7+11	2	0+0	0
43	GK	(United States) USA	Aiden Jordan	2	0	2+0	0	0+0	0
46	DF	(United States) USA	Isaiah Kaakoush	1	0	0+1	0	0+0	0
47	DF	(United States) USA	Christian Wygant	2	0	0+2	0	0+0	0
50	MF	(United States) USA	Diego Garcia	18	1	13+5	1	0+0	0
53	DF	(United States) USA	Liam Vejrostek	13	0	11+2	0	0+0	0
55	DF	(United States) USA	Wyatt Easterly	1	0	0+1	0	0+0	0
57	GK	(Colombia) COL	Nico Montoya	5	0	5+0	0	0+0	0
59	MF	(United States) USA	Christopher Salazar	7	0	2+5	0	0+0	0

- Last updated: September 20, 2026
- Source: https://www.mlsnextpro.com/clubs/north-texas-sc/stats/#season=MLS-SEA-0001K9&competition=mls-next-pro&club=MLS-CLU-000015&statType=general&position=all

=== Top scorers ===
Rank	Position	Number	Name	MLS Next Pro	MLSNP Playoffs	Total
1	MF	10	(Belgium) Edouard Nys	10	0	10
2	MF	11	(Trinidad and Tobago) Nathaniel James	8	0	8
3	MF	16	(Jamaica) Nicholas Simmonds	6	0	6
4	FW	15	(Haiti) Ricky Louis	4	0	4
5	DF	26	(United States) Slade Starnes	2	0	2
5	MF	27	(United States) Caleb Swann	2	0	2
5	MF	29	(United States) Enzo Newman	2	0	2
5	FW	36	(Poland) Daniel Baran	2	0	2
9	FW	18	(United States) Tommy Ospina	1	0	1
9	MF	20	(Honduras) Jaidyn Contreras	1	0	1
9	DF	20	(Brazil) Álvaro Augusto	1	0	1
9	FW	30	(United States) Da'vian Kimbrough	1	0	1
9	MF	50	(United States) Diego Garcia	1	0	1
9			Own Goals	1	0	1
Total				42	0	42

- Last updated: September 20, 2026
- Source: https://www.mlsnextpro.com/clubs/north-texas-sc/stats/#season=MLS-SEA-0001K9&competition=mls-next-pro&club=MLS-CLU-000015&statType=general&position=all

=== Top assists ===
Rank	Position	Number	Name	MLS Next Pro	MLSNP Playoffs	Total
1	MF	10	(Belgium) Edouard Nys	7	0	7
2	FW	15	(Haiti) Ricky Louis	3	0	3
2	MF	50	(United States) Diego Garcia	3	0	3
4	MF	16	(Jamaica) Nicholas Simmonds	2	0	2
4	MF	20	(Honduras) Jaidyn Contreras	2	0	2
4	DF	26	(United States) Slade Starnes	2	0	2
4	MF	27	(United States) Caleb Swann	2	0	2
4	FW	36	(Poland) Daniel Baran	2	0	2
4	MF	50	(United States) Diego Garcia	2	0	2
10	DF	6	(Italy) Umberto Pelà	1	0	1
10	MF	11	(Trinidad and Tobago) Nathaniel James	1	0	1
10	DF	24	(United States) Josh Torquato	1	0	1
10	FW	30	(United States) Da'vian Kimbrough	1	0	1
10	MF	59	(United States) Simeon Salazar	1	0	1
Total				28	0	28

- Last updated: September 20, 2026
- Source: https://www.mlsnextpro.com/clubs/north-texas-sc/stats/#season=MLS-SEA-0001K9&competition=mls-next-pro&club=MLS-CLU-000015&statType=general&position=all

=== Disciplinary record ===
No.	Pos.	Player	MLS Next Pro			MLSNP Playoffs			Total		
No.	Pos.	Player	Booked	(yellow card) (yellow-red card)	Sent off (straight red)	Booked	(yellow card) (yellow-red card)	Sent off (straight red)	Booked	(yellow card) (yellow-red card)	Sent off (straight red)
4	DF	(Puerto Rico) Ian Charles	6	0	0	0	0	0	6	0	0
6	MF	(Italy) Umberto Pelà	0	0	0	0	0	0	0	0	0
8	MF	(Nigeria) Favour Aroyameh	0	0	0	0	0	0	0	0	0
10	MF	(Belgium) Edouard Nys	5	0	0	0	0	0	5	0	0
11	MF	(Trinidad and Tobago) Nathaniel James	0	0	0	0	0	0	0	0	0
12	DF	(United States) Jonah Biggar	3	1	0	0	0	0	3	1	0
13	GK	(United States) Eryk Dymora	1	0	0	0	0	0	1	0	0
14	DF	(Brazil) Leandro Gonçalves	5	0	0	0	0	0	5	0	0
15	FW	(Haiti) Ricky Louis	6	0	0	0	0	0	6	0	0
16	MF	(Jamaica) Nicholas Simmonds	2	0	0	0	0	0	2	0	0
17	DF	(United States) Zach Molomo	0	0	0	0	0	0	0	0	0
18	FW	(United States) Tommy Ospina	5	1	0	0	0	0	5	1	0
19	MF	(France) Marlon Luccin	2	0	0	0	0	0	2	0	0
20	MF	(Honduras) Jaidyn Contreras	4	0	0	0	0	0	4	0	0
21	MF	(Mexico) Benji Flowers	0	0	0	0	0	0	0	0	0
22	DF	(Brazil) Álvaro Augusto	4	0	0	0	0	0	4	0	0
23	FW	(United States) Samuel Sedeh	0	0	0	0	0	0	0	0	0
24	DF	(United States) Josh Torquato	1	1	0	0	0	0	1	1	0
25	DF	(United States) Jonah Gibson	0	0	0	0	0	0	0	0	0
26	DF	(United States) Slade Starnes	5	0	0	0	0	0	5	0	0
27	MF	(United States) Caleb Swann	2	0	0	0	0	0	2	0	0
29	MF	(United States) Enzo Newman	1	0	0	0	0	0	1	0	0
30	FW	(United States) Da'vian Kimbrough	0	0	0	0	0	0	0	0	0
31	GK	(United States) Thomas Burchfield	0	0	0	0	0	0	0	0	0
32	DF	(Brazil) Lucas Martins	2	1	0	0	0	0	2	1	0
36	FW	(Poland) Daniel Baran	1	0	0	0	0	0	1	0	0
43	GK	(United States) Aiden Jordan	0	0	0	0	0	0	0	0	0
46	DF	(United States) Isaiah Kaakoush	0	0	0	0	0	0	0	0	0
47	DF	(United States) Christian Wygant	0	0	0	0	0	0	0	0	0
50	MF	(United States) Diego Garcia	2	0	0	0	0	0	2	0	0
53	DF	(United States) Liam Vejrostek	1	0	0	0	0	0	1	0	0
55	DF	(United States) Wyatt Easterly	0	0	0	0	0	0	0	0	0
57	GK	(Colombia) Nico Montoya	1	0	0	0	0	0	1	0	0
59	MF	(United States) Simeon Salazar	0	0	0	0	0	0	0	0	0
Total			58	4	0	0	0	0	58	4	0

- Last updated: September 20, 2026
- Source: https://www.mlsnextpro.com/clubs/north-texas-sc/stats/#season=MLS-SEA-0001K9&competition=mls-next-pro&club=MLS-CLU-000015&statType=general&position=all

== Awards and honors ==
=== MLS NEXT PRO Player of the Matchweek ===
Player	Matchweek	Reference
(Belgium) Eduard Nys	2	
(Trinidad and Tobago) Nathaniel James	5	

=== MLS NEXT PRO Goal of the Matchweek ===
Player	Matchweek	Reference
(Belgium) Edouard Nys	7	
(Belgium) Edouard Nys	28	
