= 2025 North Texas SC season =

North Texas SC
2025 season
- Owner: FC Dallas (Clark and Dan Hunt)
- Chairman: Matt Denny
- Head coach: John Gall
- Stadium: Choctaw Stadium
- MLSNP: Frontier Division: 1st Western Conference: 1st MLSNP: 1st
- Top goalscorer: League: Samuel Sarver (19 goals); All: Samuel Sarver (19 goals)
- Highest home attendance: 1,346 vs Real Monarchs September 27
- Lowest home attendance: 548 vs St. Louis City 2 August 16
- Average home league attendance: 905 (1 missing)
- Biggest win: Sporting KC II 1–4 North Texas SC July 18
- Biggest defeat: Houston Dynamo 2 5–1 North Texas SC March 23; North Texas SC 0–4 Los Angeles FC 2 August 24
Home colors	Away colors
- All statistics correct as of 07:28, January 27, 2025 (UTC).

The 2025 North Texas SC season was the club's seventh season. The first three seasons North Texas SC competed in USL League One, including the inaugural 2019 season. North Texas SC was the inaugural champions in USL League One. In December 2021, North Texas SC announced that they would compete in the inaugural MLS Next Pro season, a new division three league in American soccer. They were the defending MLS Next Pro champions. This was the last season at Choctaw Stadium as they will move to a brand new Soccer Specific Stadium in Mansfield, Texas in 2026.

== Staff ==
Position	Name
General manager	(England) Matt Denny
Head coach	(Brazil) Michel
Assistant coach	(United States) Alex Aldaz
Goalkeeper coach	(United States) Kyle Zobeck
Performance Analyst	(France) Johan Errami

== Current roster ==
As of April 2, 2025

No.	Pos.	Nation	Player
1	GK	USA	J.T. Harms
3	DF	USA	Gavin Gall
4	DF	MLI	Mohammed Cisset
5	DF	NZL	James Bulkeley
9	FW	ARG	Gianluca Cangiano
11	FW	USA	Sam Sarver
13	GK	USA	Antonio Carrera
17	MF	HON	Jaidyn Contreras
21	DF	USA	Zach Molomo
22	DF	BRA	Álvaro Augusto
23	MF	USA	Caleb Swann
24	DF	USA	Josh Torquato
25	DF	BRA	Kaka Scabin
29	DF	USA	Enzo Newman
30	GK	USA	Michael Collodi
35	DF	JAM	Malachi Molina
36	FW	POL	Daniel Baran
41	FW	JAM	Tarik Scott
42	DF	USA	Michael Cortellessa
45	DF	PUR	Ian Charles
46	DF	USA	Isaiah Kaakoush
49	MF	USA	Landon Hickam
50	MF	USA	Diego Garcia
51	MF	MEX	Anthony Ramirez
57	GK	USA	Nicolas Arango
59	MF	USA	Simeon Salazar
71	GK	BRA	Victor Darub
79	MF	USA	Leonardo Orejarena
—	MF	NGR	Favour Aroyameh
—	DF	GHA	Aaron Essel (on loan from St Johnstone F.C.)
—	MF	FRA	Marlon Luccin
—	GK	COL	Nico Montoya

Signed to first team contract with FC Dallas.
FC Dallas Academy player.

== Transfers ==
=== In ===
Date	Position	No.	Name	From	Fee	Ref.
December 20, 2024	MF	23	(United States) Caleb Swann	(United States) FC Dallas Academy	signing	
January 17, 2025	FW	9	(Argentina) Gianluca Cangiano	(Argentina) San Lorenzo de Almagro	signing	
January 24, 2025	DF	21	(United States) Zach Molomo	(United States) FC Dallas Academy	signing	
January 29, 2025	FW	11	(United States) Sam Sarver	(United States) Indiana Hoosiers	signing	
January 31, 2025	DF	5	(New Zealand) James Bulkeley	(United Arab Emirates) Gulf United FC	signing	
February 6, 2025	MF		(France) Marlon Luccin	(United States) FC Dallas Academy	signing	
February 20, 2025	MF		(Nigeria) Favour Aroyameh	(Nigeria) Inter Lagos FC	signing	
February 27, 2025	GK	1	(United States) JT Harms	(United States) Indiana Hoosiers	signing	
March 7, 2025	DF	3	(United States) Gavin Gall	Open Tryout	signing	
March 7, 2025	DF	4	(Mali) Mohamed Larabi Cisset	(United States) Penn State Nittany Lions	signing	
March 13, 2025	DF	24	(United States) Joshua Torquato	(United States) FC Dallas Academy	signing	
March 31, 2025	GK	57	(Colombia) Nico Montoya	(United States) FC Dallas Academy	signing	
April 10, 2025	FW		(United States) Samuel Sedeh	(United States) FC Dallas Academy	signing	
April 17, 2025	FW	10	(Liberia) Faisu Sangare	(England) Buxton	signing	

=== Loan In ===
No.	Pos.	Player	Loaned from	Start	End	Source
6	MF	(Ghana) Aaron Essel	(Scotland) St. Johnstone FC	April 2, 2025	December 31, 2025	
18	DF	(United States) Jackson DuBois	(United States) New Mexico United	July 3, 2025	December 31, 2025	

=== Out ===
Date	Position	No.	Name	To	Type	Fee	Ref.
January 9, 2025	MF	5	(Montserrat) Nico Gordon	(United States) Monterey Bay FC	Option Declined	N/A	
January 9, 2025	DF	4	(United States) Turner Humphrey	(United States) Las Vegas Lights FC	Option Declined	N/A	
January 9, 2025	MF	8	(United States) Nick Mendonca	(United States) Chattanooga FC	Option Declined	N/A	
January 9, 2025	MF	20	(Republic of the Congo) Leo Londe	(Faroe Islands) B71 Sandoy	Option Declined	N/A	
January 9, 2025	DF	9	(Argentina) Lautaro Taboada	(Argentina) San Martín de Tucumán	Option Declined	N/A	
January 9, 2025	MF	6	(Denmark) Mads Westergren	(Denmark) HB Køge	Option Declined	N/A	
January 9, 2025	MF	7	(Ivory Coast) Abdoul Zanne	(Ivory Coast) ASEC Mimosas	Loan Expired	N/A	
January 9, 2025	DF	12	(United States) Tyshawn Rose	(United States) Huntsville City FC	Out of contract	N/A	
January 9, 2025	MF	21	(United States) Dylan Lacy	(United States) West Chester United SC	Out of contract	N/A	
January 9, 2025	GK	30	(United States) Michael Collodi	(United States) FC Dallas	Signed with First Team	N/A	
January 9, 2025	MF	10	(Brazil) Pedrinho	(United States) FC Dallas	Signed with First Team	N/A	
January 9, 2025	MF	50	(United States) Diego Garcia	(United States) FC Dallas	Signed with First Team	N/A	
January 9, 2025	DF	14	(Poland) Daniel Baran	(United States) FC Dallas	Signed with First Team	N/A	
January 9, 2025	MF	2	(Jamaica) Malachi Molina	(United States) FC Dallas	Signed with First Team	N/A	
January 9, 2025	FW	16	(United States) Diego Pepi	(United States) FC Dallas	Signed with First Team	N/A	
January 9, 2025	FW	51	(United States) Anthony Ramirez	(United States) FC Dallas	Signed with First Team	N/A	
January 9, 2025	GK	13	(United States) Antonio Carrera	(Mexico) Tigres UANL	Transferred	Undisclosed	

== Non-competitive fixtures ==
=== Preseason ===
February 8	North Texas SC	4–0	Foro S.C.	Frisco, Texas
12:00 PM CDT	Sarver 13'; Molomo 19'; Swann 33'; Orejarena 70'			Stadium: Toyota Soccer Center

February 15	North Texas SC	5–1	Houston Christian Huskies	Frisco, Texas
6:00 PM CDT	Trialist 54'; Molomo 63'; Contreras 76'; Urzua 79'; Swann 81' (pen.)		25'	Stadium: Toyota Soccer Center

February 19	North Texas SC	4–3	Richland College Thunderducks	Frisco, Texas
8:00 AM CDT	Swann 3'; Baran 36' (pen.); Molina 65', 70' (pen.)		20'; 28'	Stadium: Toyota Soccer Center

February 22	Texoma FC	1–2	North Texas SC	Sherman, Texas
3:00 PM CDT	68'		Orejarena 29'; Trialist 4 33'	Stadium: Historic Bearcat Stadium

March 1	North Texas SC	1–1 (4–1 p)	SMU Mustangs	Frisco, Texas
6:00 PM CDT	Scott 51'		87'	Stadium: Toyota Soccer Center

March 23	Houston Dynamo 2	5–1	North Texas SC	Houston, Texas
12:00 PM CDT	22'; 55'; 72'		Cisset 11'; Augusto (yellow card) (yellow-red card) 57'	Stadium: Houston Sports Park

=== Midseason friendlies ===
July 26 MLS NEXT Pro Invitational	North Texas SC	3–1	Club Deportivo Tapatío	Frisco, Texas
7:30 PM CDT	Pedrinho 9', 22'; Essel (yellow card) 45'; Aroyameh (yellow card) 47'; Ntsabeleng (yellow card) 64'; Scott 67'; Gall (yellow card) 78'; Molina (yellow card) 81'; Collodi (yellow card) 90+2'; Cisset (yellow card) 90+4'	Report	Castro 25'; Freyfeld (yellow card) 38'; Delgadillo (yellow card) 48'; Moragrega (yellow card) 70'; Inda (yellow card) 77'; Jiménez (yellow card) 78'	Stadium: Toyota Stadium; Attendance: 4,359; Referee: Emmy Nonso

== Competitive fixtures ==
=== Standings ===
Pos	Div	Team	Pld	W	SOW	SOL	L	GF	GA	GD	Pts	Qualification
4	PC	Real Monarchs	28	13	4	4	7	55	42	+13	51	Qualification for the Playoffs
5	FR	Minnesota United FC 2	28	12	2	4	10	45	42	+3	44	Qualification for the Playoffs
6	FR	North Texas SC	28	11	4	2	11	46	56	−10	43	Qualification for the Playoffs
7	PC	Whitecaps FC 2	28	11	4	1	12	61	54	+7	42	Qualification for the Playoffs
8	PC	Ventura County FC	28	11	2	4	11	48	51	−3	41	Qualification for the Playoffs

Source: MLSNP
Rules for classification: 1) points; 2) total regulation wins; 3) total goal differential; 4) total goals scored; 5) total shootout wins; 6) away goal differential; 7) away goals scored; 8) home goals differential; 9) home goals scored; 10) fewer disciplinary points; 11) drawing of lots

Pos	Div	Team	Pld	W	SOW	SOL	L	GF	GA	GD	Pts	Awards
1	FR	St. Louis City 2	28	17	5	1	5	60	37	+23	62	Regular season champion
2	NE	New York Red Bulls II (C)	28	17	2	3	6	68	56	+12	58	
3	NE	Philadelphia Union II	28	15	5	3	5	64	34	+30	58	
4	NE	New England Revolution II	28	14	5	2	7	54	37	+17	54	
5	SE	Chattanooga FC	28	13	5	4	6	42	36	+6	53	
6	SE	Huntsville City FC	28	14	4	2	8	56	32	+24	52	
7	PC	The Town FC	28	14	4	2	8	59	36	+23	52	
8	FR	Colorado Rapids 2	28	15	1	4	8	55	40	+15	51	
9	PC	Real Monarchs	28	13	4	4	7	55	42	+13	51	
10	NE	Chicago Fire FC II	28	12	5	2	9	69	58	+11	48	
11	FR	Minnesota United FC 2	28	12	2	4	10	45	42	+3	44	
12	FR	North Texas SC	28	11	4	2	11	46	56	−10	43	
13	PC	Whitecaps FC 2	28	11	4	1	12	61	54	+7	42	
14	PC	Ventura County FC	28	11	2	4	11	48	51	−3	41	
15	FR	Austin FC II	28	10	3	5	10	35	36	−1	41	
16	NE	FC Cincinnati 2	28	9	7	0	12	40	41	−1	41	
17	SE	Carolina Core FC	28	8	5	5	10	42	44	−2	39	
18	PC	Portland Timbers 2	28	10	2	4	12	47	54	−7	38	
19	NE	Toronto FC II	28	10	2	4	12	34	42	−8	38	
20	SE	Atlanta United 2	28	9	2	7	10	44	43	+1	38	
21	FR	Houston Dynamo 2	28	9	4	2	13	40	47	−7	37	
22	SE	Orlando City B	28	9	4	2	13	38	55	−17	37	
23	PC	Tacoma Defiance	28	10	2	2	14	62	67	−5	36	
24	NE	New York City FC II	28	9	2	4	13	53	61	−8	35	
25	PC	Los Angeles FC 2	28	9	2	2	15	47	61	−14	33	
26	SE	Crown Legacy FC	28	7	3	5	13	45	54	−9	32	
27	SE	Inter Miami CF II	28	6	1	5	16	40	72	−32	25	
28	NE	Columbus Crew 2	28	5	1	5	17	40	64	−24	22	
29	FR	Sporting Kansas City II	28	3	2	4	19	30	67	−37	17	

Source: MLSNP
Rules for classification: 1) points; 2) total regulation wins; 3) total goal differential; 4) total goals scored; 5) total shootout wins; 6) away goal differential; 7) away goals scored; 8) home goals differential; 9) home goals scored; 10) fewer disciplinary points; 11) drawing of lots
(C) Champion

=== League ===
March 9 1	North Texas SC	0–3	St. Louis City 2	Arlington, Texas
7:30 PM CDT	Torquato (yellow card) 22'; Charles (yellow card) 50'	Report	Charles 2' (o.g.); Joyner (yellow card) 29'; McSorley 31' (yellow card) 40'; Perez 44'; Cilley (yellow card) 46'; Mikina (yellow card) 48'	Stadium: Choctaw Stadium; Attendance: 1,336; Referee: Brad Jensen

March 14 2	North Texas SC	3–2	Whitecaps FC 2	Arlington, Texas
7:30 PM CDT	Ramirez 12'; Cisset (yellow card) 16'; Sarver 32' (pen.), 45+5' (yellow card) 90+6'; Swann (yellow card) 73'; Cortellessa (yellow card) 82'; Torquato (yellow card) 82'; Baran (yellow card) 90+3'	Report	Pierre 52' (yellow card) 77'; Bovalina 69'	Stadium: Choctaw Stadium; Attendance: 932; Referee: Brandon Stevis

March 23 3	Houston Dynamo 2	5–1	North Texas SC	Houston, Texas
6:00 PM CDT	Bruegmann 22'; Arzú (yellow card) 24' (goal) 74'; Gonzalez 55'; Correa 71' (yellow card) 85'; Gardner 83'	Report	Scott (yellow card) 3'; Cisset 11'; Augusto (yellow card) 26' (yellow-red card) 57'	Stadium: SaberCats Stadium; Referee: Servando Berna

March 28 4	North Texas SC	3–3 (4–5 p)	Sporting Kansas City II	Arlington, Texas
7:45 PM CDT	Ramirez (yellow card) 3'; Scott 36', 49'; Molina 42' (pen.); Swann (yellow card) 72'	Report	Tschantret 29' (yellow card) 79'; Zavala (yellow card) 62'; Ortiz 81'; Quintero 85'	Stadium: Choctaw Stadium; Attendance: 1,186; Referee: Calin Radosav
	Penalties
	Garcia (penalty missed); Contreras (penalty scored); Swann (penalty missed); Torquato (penalty scored); Kaakoush (penalty missed); Urzua (penalty scored); Cisset (penalty scored); Gall (penalty missed)		(penalty scored) Goumballe; (penalty missed) Arellano; (penalty scored) Ortiz; (penalty missed) Tschantret; (penalty missed) Lurot; (penalty scored) Christiano; (penalty scored) Samways; (penalty scored) Derksen

April 5 5	Portland Timbers 2	1–2	North Texas SC	Portland, Oregon
3:00 PM CDT	Linhares 1'; Bunbury (yellow card) 45+5'; Guerra (yellow card) 45+5'; VanVoorhis (yellow card) 54'; Moreno (yellow card) 90+11'	Report	Baran 14'; Newman (yellow card) 31'; Gall (yellow card) 45+2'; Charles (yellow card) 90'; Molina 90+3'	Stadium: Providence Park; Referee: Christopher Calderon

April 11 6	Austin FC II	1–1 (2–4 p)	North Texas SC	Austin, Texas
5:00 PM CDT	Cieśla (yellow card) 18'; Grogan 28'; Dǎnciuțiu (yellow card) 74'; De Anda (yellow card) 88'; Abarca (yellow card) 90'	Report	Charles 80'; Urzua (yellow card) 82'; Orejarena (yellow card) 90+4'	Stadium: Parmer Field; Referee: Gloria Martinez Resendiz
	Penalties
	Bonachera (penalty scored); González (penalty scored); Abarca (penalty missed); Fakarlun (penalty missed)		(penalty scored) Urzua; (penalty missed) Charles; (penalty scored) Kaakoush; (penalty scored) Orejarena; (penalty scored) Contreras

April 20 7	North Texas SC	2–3	Colorado Rapids 2	Arlington, Texas
7:30 PM CDT	Sarver 47', 55' (pen.)	Report	Diop 11' (yellow card) 75'; Bassett 39'; Swan 90+2'	Stadium: Choctaw Stadium; Attendance: 868; Referee: Lauren Aldrich

April 23 8	North Texas SC	2–0	The Town FC	Arlington, Texas
7:30 PM CDT	Gall 17'; Essel (yellow card) 45+1'; Torquato (yellow card) 45+3'; Swann (yellow card) 52'; Scott 55' (pen.)	Report	Ricketts (yellow card) 38'; Eisner (yellow card) 59'	Stadium: Choctaw Stadium; Attendance: 619; Referee: Lauren Aldrich

May 2 9	MNUFC2	0–1	North Texas SC	Blaine, Minnesota
3:00 PM CDT	Casillas-Lopez (yellow card) 12'; Padelford (yellow card) 38'; Fischer (yellow card) 45+1'	Report	Hickam 8'; Torquato (yellow card) 14'; Molina (yellow card) 50'; Baran (yellow card) 90+1'	Stadium: National Sports Center; Referee: Andrew Porada

May 18 10	North Texas SC	2–1	Houston Dynamo 2	Arlington, Texas
7:30 PM CDT	Augusto (yellow card) 13'; Essel (yellow card) 24'; Sarver 65' (pen.) (yellow card) 66'; Torquato (yellow card) 69'; Garcia 87'; Charles (yellow card) 90+2'	Report	Puna (yellow card) 55'; Mwakutuya (yellow card) 72'; Gyamfi 74'; Burbano (red card) 90+4'	Stadium: Choctaw Stadium; Referee: Alex Beehler

May 25 11	Tacoma Defiance	2–3	North Texas SC	Tukwila, Washington
9:00 PM CDT	Tsukanome 25'; Leyva (yellow card) 45+3'; Yamada 79'; Kingston (yellow card) 83'	Report	Charles (yellow card) 17'; Sarver 19', 77' (pen.); Álvaro Augusto (yellow card) 43'; Sangare 74' (red card) 88'	Stadium: Starfire Stadium; Referee: Justin St. Pierre

June 4 12	St. Louis City 2	2–0	North Texas SC	St. Louis, Missouri
7:00 PM CDT	Jääskeläinen 15' (yellow card) 44'; Cilley (yellow card) 25'; Kidd 40'; Reid (yellow card) 59'; Becher (yellow card) 67'; Perez (yellow card) 90+3'; Clark (yellow card) 90+5'	Report	Scott (yellow card) 17'; Essel (yellow card) 43'; Augusto (yellow card) 59'; Cisset (yellow card) 73'	Stadium: Energizer Park; Referee: Ryan Shanklin

June 14 13	North Texas SC	1–2	Austin FC II	Arlington, Texas
7:45 PM CDT	Cisset (yellow card) 23'; Charles (yellow card) 30'; Essel (yellow card) 33'; Scott (yellow card) 34'; Sarver (yellow card) 64'; Harms (yellow card) 67'; Urzua 78'; Cortellessa (yellow card) 81'	Report	Farrar (yellow card) 6'; Alastuey 32' (pen.); Barro (yellow card) 43'; Burton 71'; Fodrey (yellow card) 75'; González (yellow card) 90+3'	Stadium: Choctaw Stadium; Attendance: 1,093; Referee: Johnathan Luk

June 18 14	Colorado Rapids 2	1–1 (2–4 p)	North Texas SC	Denver, Colorado
7:00 PM CDT	Amadou (yellow card) 55'; Rinaldi (yellow card) 57'; Swan 70'; Diop (yellow card) 82'	Report	Urzua (yellow card) 18'; Ramírez (yellow card) 31'; Torquato (yellow card) 45'; Sarver 60'; Bulkeley (yellow card) 75'	Stadium: University of Denver Soccer Stadium; Referee: Jacob Larson
	Penalties
	Wathuta (penalty missed); Rosa (penalty scored); Pinto (penalty missed); Diop (penalty missed)		(penalty scored) Sarver; (penalty missed) Urzua; (penalty scored) Baran; (penalty scored) Scott; (penalty scored) Essel

June 21 15	Whitecaps FC 2	4–3	North Texas SC	Burnaby, British Columbia
3:00 PM CDT	Russo (yellow card) 6'; Coupland 10'; Pierre (yellow card) 41' (goal) 76'; Elloumi 50', 68'; Tsuji (yellow card) 52'; Clark (yellow card) 81'	Report	Torquato 8' (yellow card) 35'; Sarver 32' (pen.) (yellow card) 45+3'; Charles 70'	Stadium: Swangard Stadium; Referee: Nicolas Melita

July 3 16	North Texas SC	3–1	Minnesota United FC II	Arlington, Texas
7:45 PM CDT	Scott 2', 53'; Essel (yellow card) 34'; Sarver 46'; Cisset (yellow card) 72'; Harms (yellow card) 88'	Report	Calov (yellow card) 36' (yellow-red card) 73'; Putt (yellow card) 45+2'; Nour 86'; Niang (yellow card) 90'; Fischer (red card)	Stadium: Choctaw Stadium; Attendance: 1,024; Referee: Kyle Armstrong

July 13 17	Houston Dynamo 2	3–0	North Texas SC	Houston, Texas
7:00 PM CDT	Gyamfi 10'; Viveros (yellow card) 19'; Halliday (yellow card) 25'; Rodríguez 31'; Marinez 51'; Wolff (yellow card) 56'; Oliveira (yellow card) 61'	Report	DuBois (yellow card) 73'; Cisset (yellow card) 90'	Stadium: SaberCats Stadium; Referee: Amin Hadzic

July 18 18	Sporting KC II	1–4	North Texas SC	Kansas City, Missouri
7:30 PM CDT	Donovan (yellow card) 28'; Clarke (yellow card) 42'; Arellano 64'; Barren (yellow card) 90+3'	Report	Sarver 15', 23', 35', 50'	Stadium: Swope Soccer Village; Referee: Corbyn May

August 2 19	North Texas SC	1–4	Colorado Rapids 2	Arlington, Texas
7:45 PM CDT	Sarver 50' (yellow card) 90+4'; DuBois (yellow card) 82'	Report	García 26' (pen.) (red card) 81'; Diop 28', 66'; Essel 33' (o.g.)	Stadium: Choctaw Stadium; Attendance: 746; Referee: Elton Garcia

August 8 20	Austin FC II	1–1 (5–6 p)	North Texas SC	Austin, Texas
7:30 PM CDT	Dǎnciuțiu (yellow card) 56'; Cieśla (yellow card) 63'; González (yellow card) 82'; Alastuey 90+1'; Bonachera (yellow card) 90+4'; Moreno (yellow card) 90+7'	Report	Aroyameh (yellow card) 43'; Swann 48'; Harms (yellow card) 87'; Pedrinho (yellow card) 90+2'	Stadium: Parmer Field; Referee: Aleksandar Zhelyazkov
	Penalties
	Bonachera (penalty scored); González (penalty scored); Alastuey (penalty scored); Gomez (penalty scored); Bery (penalty scored); Farkarlun (penalty missed)		(penalty scored) Essel; (penalty scored) Urzua; (penalty scored) Swann; (penalty scored) Kaakoush; (penalty scored) Pedrinho; (penalty scored) Salazar

August 16 21	North Texas SC	1–3	St. Louis City 2	Arlington, Texas
7:45 PM CDT	Essel (yellow card) 11' (goal) 49'; Aroyameh (yellow card) 15'; Gall (yellow card) 37'; Cisset (yellow card) 71'	Report	Jääskeläinen (yellow card) 11'; Joyner 45'; McSorley 51'; Antwi (yellow card) 63'; Kuzain (yellow card) 64'; Kidd (yellow card) 88' (goal) 90+2'	Stadium: Choctaw Stadium; Attendance: 548; Referee: Melvin Rivas

August 24 22	North Texas SC	0–4	Los Angeles FC 2	Arlington, Texas
7:45 PM CDT	Gall (yellow card) 19'; Cisset (yellow card) 24' (yellow-red card) 36'; Augusto (yellow card) 90'	Report	Guerra 25' (pen.); Nielsen (yellow card) 33'; Nava 40'; Zambrano 60', 75'	Stadium: Choctaw Stadium; Attendance: 628; Referee: Joshua Madison

August 31 23	Ventura County FC	0–1	North Texas SC	Thousand Oaks, California
9:00 PM CDT	Dalgado (yellow card) 33'; Vivi (yellow card) 42'; Middleby (yellow card) 82'	Report	Sarver 33' (pen.); Gall (yellow card) 57' (yellow-red card); Baran (yellow card) 58'; Harms (yellow card) 70'	Stadium: William Rolland Stadium; Referee: Dion Coxe-Trieger

September 6 24	North Texas SC	1–1 (5–4 p)	Ventura County FC	Arlington, Texas
7:30 PM CDT	Essel (yellow card) 55' (goal) 90+1'; Swann (yellow card) 68'	Report	Vivi 47'; Saribekyan (yellow card) 58'	Stadium: Choctaw Stadium; Attendance: 784; Referee: Alejo Calume
	Penalties
	Urzua (penalty scored); Essel (penalty scored); Swann (penalty scored); Salazar (penalty scored); Contreras (penalty scored)		(penalty scored) Musto; (penalty missed) Arnold; (penalty scored) Karani; (penalty scored) Bucknor; (penalty scored) Vivi

September 14 25	North Texas SC	1–1 (3–4 p)	Sporting Kansas City II	Arlington, Texas
7:30 PM CDT	Torquato (yellow card) 24'; Augusto (yellow card) 31'; Swann (yellow card) 59'; Contreras 82'	Report	Uderitz (yellow card) 65'; Lurot 89'; Kortkamp (yellow card) 90+3'	Stadium: Choctaw Stadium; Attendance: 654; Referee: Kevin Lewis
	Penalties
	Sarver (penalty scored); Urzua (penalty scored); Salazar (penalty scored); Swann (penalty missed); Contreras (penalty missed)		(penalty scored) Mabie; (penalty scored) Ortiz; (penalty scored) Donovan; (penalty scored) Samways

September 21 26	Minnesota United FC 2	1–2	North Texas SC	St. Paul, Minnesota
3:00 PM CDT	Torres (yellow card) 42'; Fariña 55'	Report	DuBois (yellow card) 14'; Swann 42'; Contreras 60'	Stadium: Allianz Field; Referee: Drew Klemp

September 27 27	North Texas SC	2–4	Real Monarchs	Arlington, Texas
7:30 PM CDT	Salazar 6'; Sangare 86'; Cisset (yellow card) 90+2'	Report	Barea 25', 31'; Hezarkhani (yellow card) 45+4'; Silva (yellow card) 50'; Jennings 56'; dos Santos 60'; Calderón (yellow card) 77'	Stadium: Choctaw Stadium; Attendance: 1,346; Referee: Muhammad Kaleia

October 5 28	Los Angeles FC 2	2–4	North Texas SC	Los Angeles, California
3:00 PM CDT	Evans 23', 45'; Díaz (yellow card) 90+2'	Report	DuBois (yellow card) 13'; García 69'; Sarver 72', 81', 86' (yellow card) 86'	Stadium: Rawlinson Stadium; Referee: Trevor Wiseman

=== Playoffs ===
October 19 Conference Quarterfinals	The Town FC	3–0	North Texas SC	San Jose, California
9:00 PM EDT	Floriani 32'; Rodríguez 48'; Fernandez 82'	Report	Ramirez (yellow card) 27'; Cisset (yellow card) 58'	Stadium: PayPal Park; Referee: Rodrigo Albuquerque

== Statistics ==
Numbers after plus-sign(+) denote appearances as a substitute.

=== Appearances and goals ===
No.	Pos	Nat	Player	Total		MLS Next Pro		MLSNP Playoffs	
No.	Pos	Nat	Player	Apps	Goals	Apps	Goals	Apps	Goals
1	GK	(United States) USA	JT Harms	16	0	15+0	0	1+0	0
3	DF	(United States) USA	Gavin Gall	22	1	17+4	1	1+0	0
4	DF	(Mali) MLI	Mohamed Cisset	22	1	20+1	1	1+0	0
5	DF	(New Zealand) NZL	James Bulkeley	11	0	9+2	0	0+0	0
6	MF	(Ghana) GHA	Aaron Essel	17	2	15+1	2	1+0	0
8	MF	(Nigeria) NGR	Favour Aroyameh	8	0	4+4	0	0+0	0
9	FW	(Argentina) ARG	Gianluca Cangiano	2	0	2+0	0	0+0	0
10	FW	(Liberia) LBR	Faisu Sangare	13	1	9+3	1	0+1	0
11	FW	(United States) USA	Samuel Sarver	25	19	24+1	19	0+0	0
13	GK	(United States) USA	Antonio Carrera	5	0	5+0	0	0+0	0
17	MF	(Honduras) HON	Jaidyn Contreras	27	2	10+16	2	1+0	0
18	DF	(United States) USA	Jackson Dubois	14	0	7+6	0	1+0	0
20	FW	(Brazil) BRA	Pedrinho	1	0	1+0	0	0+0	0
21	DF	(United States) USA	Zach Molomo	7	0	0+6	0	0+1	0
22	DF	(United States) USA	Álvaro Augusto	14	0	12+1	0	1+0	0
23	MF	(United States) USA	Caleb Swann	29	2	18+10	2	1+0	0
24	DF	(United States) USA	Josh Torquato	16	1	15+1	1	0+0	0
25	DF	(Brazil) BRA	Kaka Scabin	0	0	0+0	0	0+0	0
26	MF	(France) FRA	Marlon Luccin	1	0	0+1	0	0+0	0
29	DF	(United States) USA	Enzo Newman	4	0	4+0	0	0+0	0
30	GK	(United States) USA	Michael Collodi	2	0	2+0	0	0+0	0
32	DF	(United States) USA	Nolan Norris	2	0	2+0	0	0+0	0
34	FW	(United States) USA	Alejandro Urzua	21	1	10+10	1	1+0	0
35	MF	(Jamaica) JAM	Malachi Molina	16	1	13+3	1	0+0	0
36	DF	(Poland) POL	Daniel Baran	20	1	7+13	1	0+0	0
39	FW	(United States) USA	Samuel Sedeh	3	0	0+2	0	0+1	0
39	MF	(United States) USA	Jonah Gibson	1	0	0+0	0	0+1	0
41	FW	(Jamaica) JAM	Tarik Scott	15	5	15+0	5	0+0	0
42	DF	(United States) USA	Michael Cortellessa	7	0	2+5	0	0+0	0
45	DF	(Puerto Rico) PUR	Ian Charles	11	2	10+1	2	0+0	0
46	DF	(United States) USA	Isaiah Kaakoush	12	0	5+7	0	0+0	0
	DF	(United States) USA	Christian Wygant	1	0	0+1	0	0+0	0
49	MF	(United States) USA	Landon Hickam	9	1	6+3	1	0+0	0
50	MF	(United States) USA	Diego Garcia	17	2	15+1	2	1+0	0
51	FW	(Mexico) MEX	Anthony Ramirez	21	1	19+1	1	1+0	0
55	DF	(United States) USA	Daniel Easterly	1	0	0+1	0	0+0	0
57	GK	(Colombia) COL	Nicolas Arango Montoya	7	0	7+0	0	0+0	0
59	MF	(United States) USA	Christopher Salazar	18	1	2+16	1	0+0	0
71	GK	(Brazil) BRA	Victor Darub	0	0	0+0	0	0+0	0
79	MF	(United States) USA	Leonardo Orejarena	7	0	1+6	0	0+0	0
99	MF	(Romania) ROU	Enes Sali	1	0	1+0	0	0+0	0

- Last updated: October 5, 2025
- Source: https://www.mlsnextpro.com/clubs/north-texas-sc/stats/#season=MLS-SEA-0001K9&competition=mls-next-pro&club=MLS-CLU-000015&statType=general&position=all

=== Top scorers ===
Rank	Position	Number	Name	MLS Next Pro	MLSNP Playoffs	Total
1	FW	11	(United States) Samuel Sarver	19	0	19
2	FW	41	(Jamaica) Tarik Scott	5	0	5
3	MF	6	(Ghana) Aaron Essel	2	0	2
3	FW	10	(Liberia) Faisu Sangare	2	0	2
3	MF	17	(Honduras) Jaidyn Contreras	2	0	2
3	MF	23	(United States) Caleb Swann	2	0	2
3	MF	35	(Jamaica) Malachi Molina	2	0	2
3	FW	45	(Puerto Rico) Ian Charles	2	0	2
3	MF	50	(United States) Diego Garcia	2	0	2
10	DF	3	(United States) Gavin Gall	1	0	1
10	DF	4	(Mali) Mohammed Cisset	1	0	1
10	DF	24	(United States) Josh Torquato	1	0	1
10	FW	34	(United States) Alejandro Urzua	1	0	1
10	DF	36	(Poland) Daniel Baran	1	0	1
10	MF	49	(United States) Landon Hickam	1	0	1
10	FW	51	(Mexico) Anthony Ramirez	1	0	1
10	MF	59	(United States) Christopher Salazar	1	0	1
Total				46	0	46

- Last updated: October 5, 2025
- Source: https://www.mlsnextpro.com/clubs/north-texas-sc/stats/#season=MLS-SEA-0001K9&competition=mls-next-pro&club=MLS-CLU-000015&statType=general&position=all

=== Top assists ===
Rank	Position	Number	Name	MLS Next Pro	MLSNP Playoffs	Total
1	FW	51	(Mexico) Anthony Ramirez	6	0	6
2	FW	11	(United States) Samuel Sarver	4	0	4
3	DF	24	(United States) Josh Torquato	3	0	3
4	MF	17	(Honduras) Jaidyn Contreras	2	0	2
4	MF	35	(Jamaica) Malachi Molina	2	0	2
4	DF	36	(Poland) Daniel Baran	2	0	2
7	MF	6	(Ghana) Aaron Essel	1	0	1
7	MF	8	(Nigeria) Favour Aroyameh	1	0	1
7	GK	13	(United States) Antonio Carrera	1	0	1
7	DF	18	(United States) Jackson DuBois	1	0	1
7	FW	20	(Brazil) Pedrinho	1	0	1
7	DF	22	(Brazil) Álvaro Augusto	1	0	1
7	FW	34	(United States) Alejandro Urzua	1	0	1
7	FW	39	(United States) Samuel Sedeh	1	0	1
7	FW	41	(Jamaica) Tarik Scott	1	0	1
7	MF	50	(United States) Diego Garcia	1	0	1
Total				29	0	29

- Last updated: October 5, 2025
- Source: https://www.mlsnextpro.com/clubs/north-texas-sc/stats/#season=MLS-SEA-0001K9&competition=mls-next-pro&club=MLS-CLU-000015&statType=general&position=all

=== Disciplinary record ===
No.	Pos.	Player	MLS Next Pro			MLSNP Playoffs			Total		
No.	Pos.	Player	Yellow card	(yellow card) (yellow-red card)	Red card	Yellow card	(yellow card) (yellow-red card)	Red card	Yellow card	(yellow card) (yellow-red card)	Red card
1	GK	(United States) J.T. Harms	4	0	0	0	0	0	4	0	0
3	DF	(United States) Gavin Gall	5	1	0	0	0	0	5	1	0
4	DF	(Mali) Mohamed Cisset	9	1	0	1	0	0	10	1	0
5	DF	(New Zealand) James Bulkeley	1	0	0	0	0	0	1	0	0
6	MF	(Ghana) Aaron Essel	7	0	0	0	0	0	7	0	0
8	MF	(Nigeria) Favour Aroyameh	2	0	0	0	0	0	2	0	0
9	FW	(Argentina) Gianluca Cangiano	0	0	0	0	0	0	0	0	0
10	FW	(Liberia) Faisu Sangare	0	0	1	0	0	0	0	0	1
11	FW	(United States) Samuel Sarver	6	0	0	0	0	0	6	0	0
13	GK	(United States) Antonio Carrera	0	0	0	0	0	0	0	0	0
17	MF	(Honduras) Jaidyn Contreras	0	0	0	0	0	0	0	0	0
18	DF	(United States) Jackson DuBois	4	0	0	0	0	0	4	0	0
20	FW	(Brazil) Pedrinho	1	0	0	0	0	0	1	0	0
21	DF	(United States) Zach Molomo	0	0	0	0	0	0	0	0	0
22	DF	(Brazil) Álvaro Augusto	7	1	0	0	0	0	7	1	0
23	MF	(United States) Caleb Swann	5	0	0	0	0	0	5	0	0
24	DF	(United States) Josh Torquato	8	0	0	0	0	0	8	0	0
25	DF	(Brazil) Kaka Scabin	0	0	0	0	0	0	0	0	0
26	MF	(France) Marlon Luccin	0	0	0	0	0	0	0	0	0
29	DF	(United States) Enzo Newman	1	0	0	0	0	0	1	0	0
30	GK	(United States) Michael Collodi	0	0	0	0	0	0	0	0	0
35	DF	(Jamaica) Malachi Molina	1	0	0	0	0	0	1	0	0
34	FW	(United States) Alejandro Urzua	2	0	0	1	0	0	3	0	0
36	FW	(Poland) Daniel Baran	3	0	0	0	0	0	3	0	0
41	MF	(Jamaica) Tarik Scott	2	0	0	0	0	0	2	0	0
42	DF	(United States) Michael Cortellessa	3	0	0	0	0	0	3	0	0
45	DF	(Puerto Rico) Ian Charles	5	0	0	0	0	0	5	0	0
46	DF	(United States) Isaiah Kaakoush	0	0	0	0	0	0	0	0	0
49	MF	(United States) Landon Hickam	0	0	0	0	0	0	0	0	0
50	MF	(United States) Diego Garcia	0	0	0	0	0	0	0	0	0
51	MF	(Mexico) Anthony Ramirez	2	0	0	1	0	0	3	0	0
57	GK	(Colombia) Nicolas Arango Montoya	0	0	0	0	0	0	0	0	0
59	MF	(United States) Simeon Salazar	0	0	0	0	0	0	0	0	0
71	GK	(Brazil) Victor Darub	0	0	0	0	0	0	0	0	0
79	MF	(United States) Leonardo Orejarena	1	0	0	0	0	0	1	0	0
Total			79	3	1	3	0	0	82	3	1

- Last updated: October 19, 2025
- Source: https://www.mlsnextpro.com/clubs/north-texas-sc/stats/#season=MLS-SEA-0001K9&competition=mls-next-pro&club=MLS-CLU-000015&statType=general&position=all

== Awards and honors ==
=== MLS NEXT Player of the Matchweek ===
Player	Matchweek	Reference
(United States) Sam Sarver	19	
(United States) Sam Sarver	30	

=== MLS NEXT Rising Star of the Matchweek ===
Player	Matchweek	Reference
(Puerto Rico) Ian Charles	5	
(United States) Landon Hickam	8	

=== MLS NEXT Pro Goal of the Matchweek ===
Player	Matchweek	Reference
(United States) Gavin Gall	7	
(United States) Landon Hickam	8	
(Honduras) Jaidyn Contreras	28	

=== MLS NEXT Player of the Month ===
Player	Month	Reference
(United States) Samuel Sarver	July	

=== MLS NEXT Pro Best XI ===
Player	Position	Ref
(United States) Samuel Sarver	Forward	
