= Joshua Calderón =

Puerto Rican footballer (born 1996)

Personal information
- Full name: Joshua Javier Calderón Chaparro
- Date of birth: 11 September 1996 (age 30)
- Place of birth: North Haven, Connecticut, United States
- Height: 6 ft 2 in (1.88 m)
- Position: Defender

Youth career
- FC Westchester Academy
- St Benedict's PDA

College career
Years	Team	Apps	(Gls)
2014–2017	Iona Gaels	59	(5)

Senior career*
Years	Team	Apps	(Gls)
2018	Elm City Express		
2019	Patriotas Boyacá	0	(0)
2019–2020	Boca Gibraltar		
2020	CD Ferroviario	0	(0)
2021	AC Connecticut	2	(0)
2021	Metropolitan FA		
2022	Western Mass Pioneers	2	(0)

International career^{‡}
2012	Puerto Rico U17	3	(1)
2018–2019	Puerto Rico	7	(0)
- * Club domestic league appearances and goals as of 14:19, 28 March 2023 (UTC) ‡ National team caps and goals as of 20:12, 28 March 2023 (UTC)

Joshua Javier Calderón Chaparro (born 11 September 1996) is a Puerto Rican soccer player who plays as a defender.

== Early life ==
Calderón was born in North Haven, Connecticut to a Colombian father and Puerto Rican mother.

== College soccer ==
Having played soccer at the St. Benedict's Preparatory School's player development academy, Calderón committed to playing college soccer at the Iona University. He went on to make a total of fifty-nine appearances over four years for the university soccer team, the Iona Gaels, scoring five goals.

== Club career ==
After leaving university, Calderón spent a season with Elm City Express in the National Premier Soccer League in 2018. He later travelled to Colombia and went on trial with Boyacá Chicó, before spending six months with Patriotas Boyacá, though he was unable to sign officially with either. He also spent three months in Spain with UD Ourense, though this appears to be a trial, as no record of him appearing for the club exists.

Calderón spent time with Colombian side Acción Cívica in 2019, and was briefly signed with Boca Gibraltar in December of the same year, before spending the 2020 pre-season with American side Hartford Athletic. He also trained with English EFL League Two side Cambridge United, before his stay was cut short by the COVID-19 pandemic in England.

In October 2020, he was one of five Puerto Rican soccer players to travel to Bolivia to play in the Copa Simón Bolívar with CD Ferroviario. He returned to the United States in 2021, playing two games for AC Connecticut in the USL League Two in May 2021.

He signed with Puerto Rican side Metropolitan FA in July 2021, ahead of the club's participation in the CONCACAF Champions League. Later in the same year, he returned to Colombia to train with Categoría Primera A side América de Cali He signed his first professional contract under Juan Carlos Osorio for América de Cali. Because of his affiliation with Metropolitan, the Puerto Rican Federation did not acknowledge him as a free agent and prevented him from debuting in the Colombian 1st Division.

In 2022, he made two appearances for the Western Mass Pioneers in the USL League Two, and received a red card in team's 2–0 U.S. Open Cup win over Brockton.

== Personal life ==
His younger brother, Giovanni, is also a soccer player, and has also represented Puerto Rico at international level. His older brother, Neekoli, is a former soccer player.

== Career statistics ==
=== Club ===
As of

Appearances and goals by club, season and competition
Club	Season	League			Cup		Other		Total	
Club	Season	Division	Apps	Goals	Apps	Goals	Apps	Goals	Apps	Goals
Patriotas Boyacá	2019	Categoría Primera A	0	0	0	0	0	0	0	0
AC Connecticut	2021	USL League Two	2	0	2 (Note: Appearances in the U.S. Open Cup)	0	0	0	4	0
Western Mass Pioneers	2022	USL League Two	2	0	1	0	0	0	3	0
Career total			4	0	3	0	0	0	7	0

=== International ===
As of matches played 28 January 2019

Appearances and goals by national team and year
National team	Year	Apps	-	Puerto Rico	2018	3	0
2019	4	0		Puerto Rico			
Total		7	0				
