= North Haven, Connecticut =

Town in Connecticut, US

- Town
- Town of North Haven
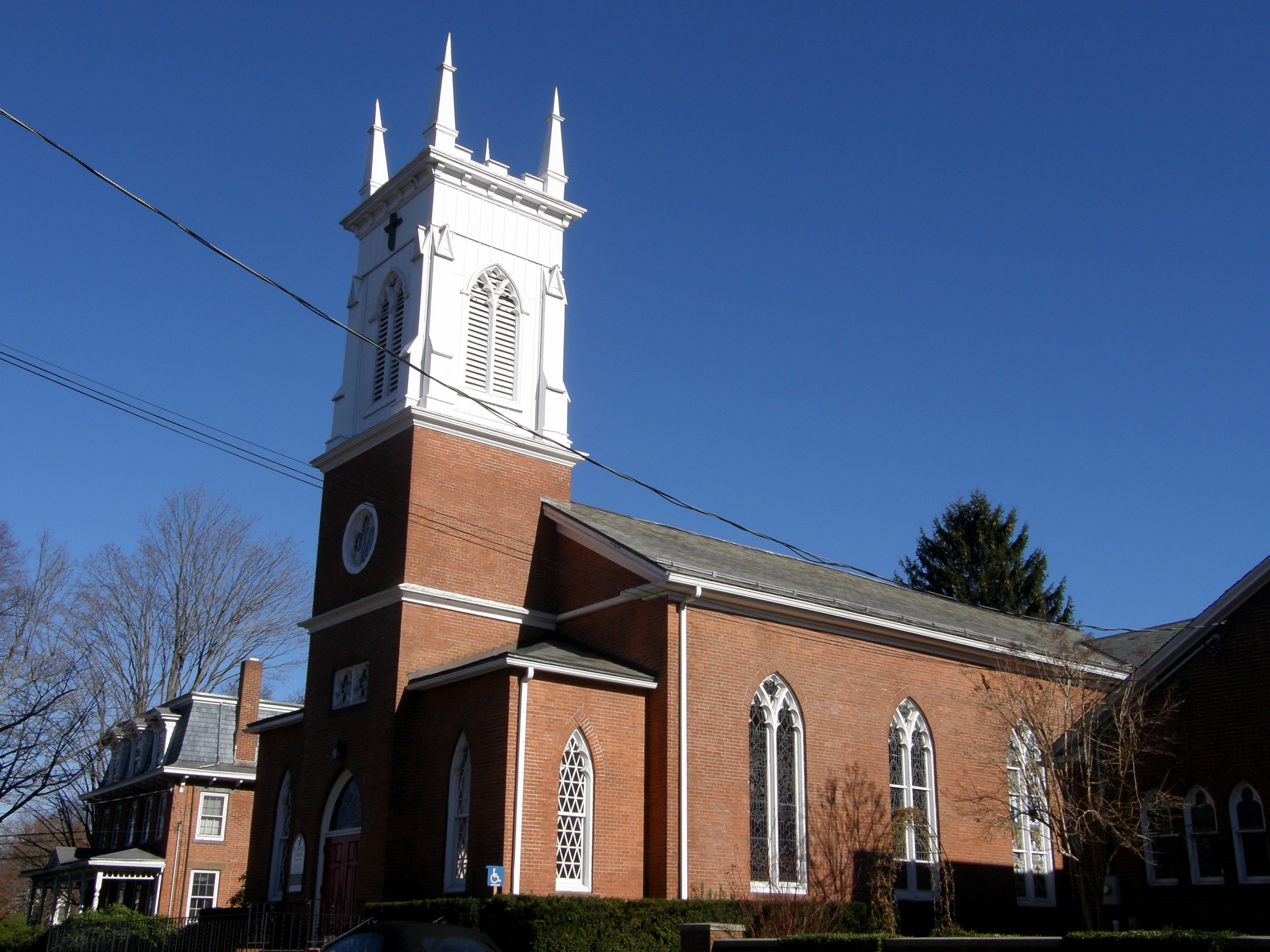
- St. John's Episcopal Church, built in 1834

- Flag Seal

- Coordinates: 41°22′54″N 72°51′30″W
- Country: United States
- U.S. state: Connecticut
- County: New Haven
- Region: South Central CT
- Incorporated: 1786

Government
  - Type: Selectman-town meeting
  - First Selectman: Michael Freda (R)
  - Selectman: William J. Pieper (R)
  - Selectman: Sally Buemi (D)

Area
  - Total: 21.1 sq mi (54.6 km^{2})
  - Land: 20.8 sq mi (53.8 km^{2})
  - Water: 0.31 sq mi (0.8 km^{2})
- Elevation: 66 ft (20 m)

Population (2020)
  - Total: 24,253
  - Density: 1,170/sq mi (451/km^{2})
- Time zone: UTC−5 (Eastern)
  - Summer (DST): UTC−4 (Eastern)
- ZIP Code: 06473
- Area codes: 203/475
- FIPS code: 09-54870
- GNIS feature ID: 0213479
- Website: www.northhaven-ct.gov

North Haven is a town in New Haven County, Connecticut, United States on the outskirts of New Haven. The town is part of the South Central Connecticut Planning Region. As of the 2020 census, it had a population of 24,253.

North Haven is home of the Quinnipiac University School of Health Sciences, the School of Nursing, School of Law, School of Education, and School of Medicine on Bassett Road. North Haven has easy access to Interstate 91 and the Wilbur Cross Parkway (Route 15). It is near Sleeping Giant State Park and less than 10 miles (16 km) from downtown New Haven and Yale University.

== History ==
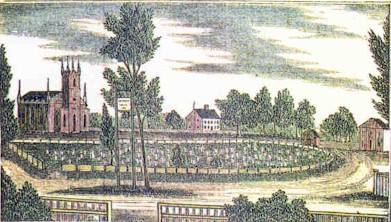
John Warner Barber's 1835 engraving, showing St. John's Episcopal Church, the Trumbull House, and the North Haven Congregational Church in the town of Green

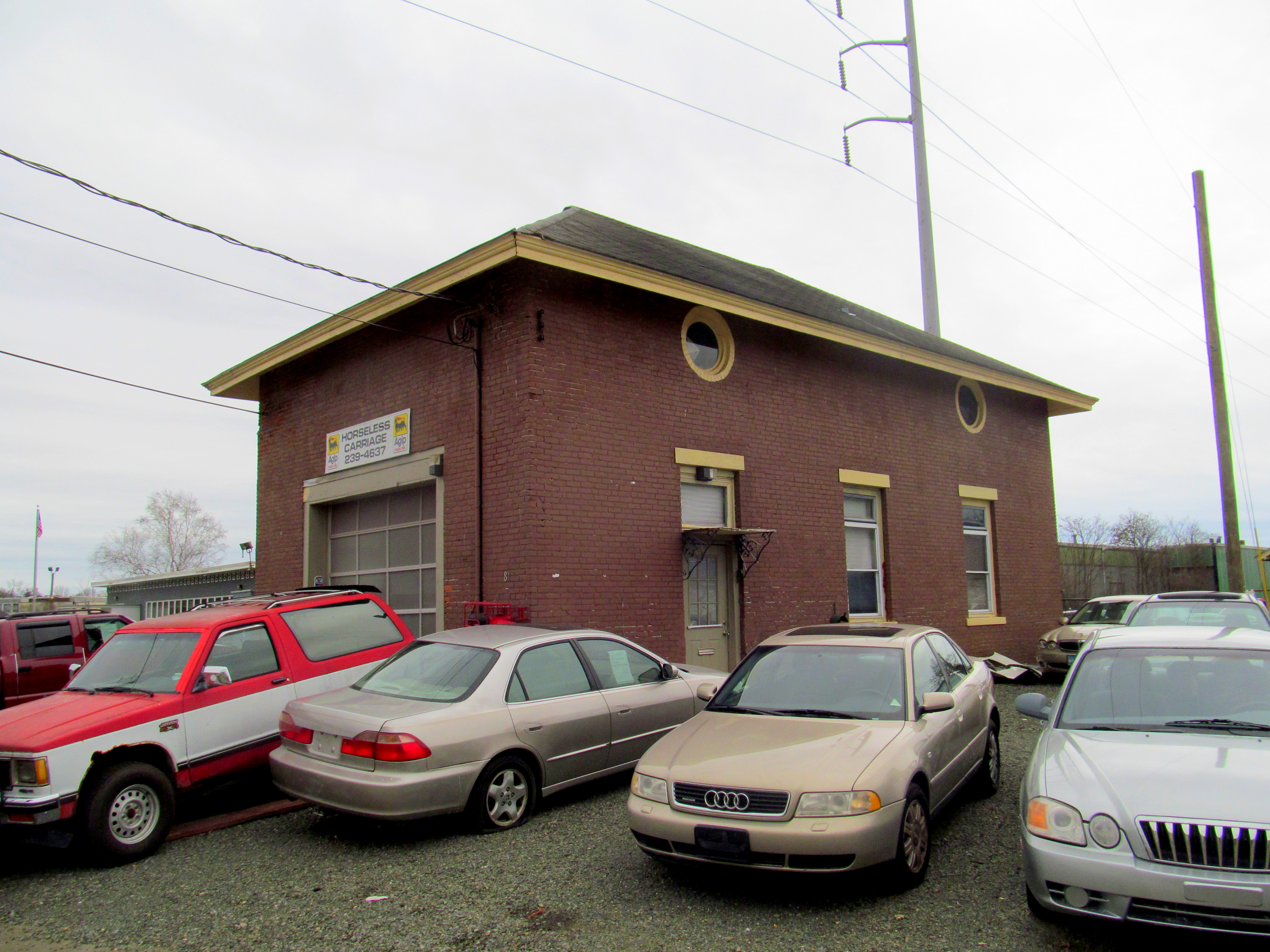
Former North Haven station, December 2015. There are plans to construct a new station in North Haven, which will be served by the Hartford Line and Amtrak.

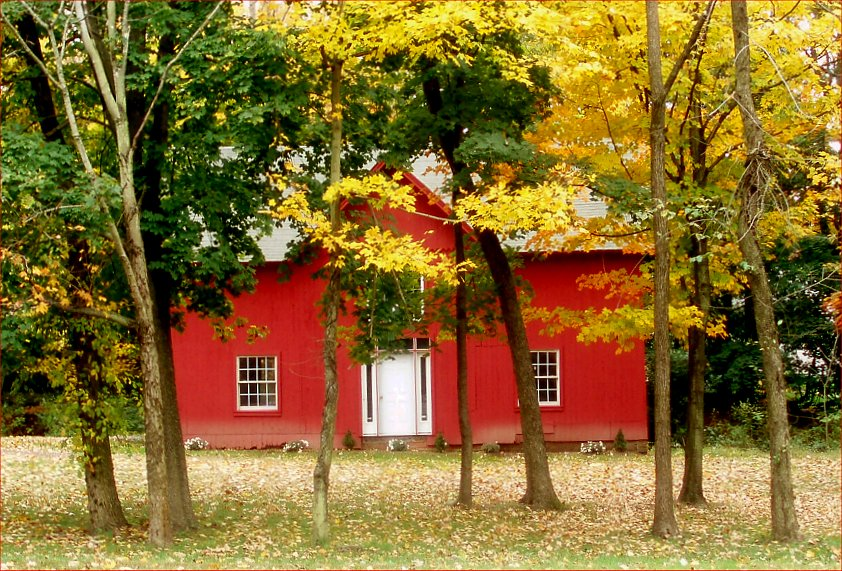
Storage barn

In his will of 1714, the Reverend James Pierpont (1659–1714) of New Haven gave 8 acres (32,000 m^{2}) to his neighbors in the Northeast Parish, as North Haven was called, "provided those neighbors will set their meeting house there and do their training and burying there."

The first meeting house, completed in 1722, stood on the Green, west of what is now known as the Old Center Cemetery. About half of the original Pierpont gift remains today as the North Haven Green.

Ezra Stiles enumerated about forty families living in North Haven in the early part of the eighteenth century. All of these people were multipurpose farmers, producing what they needed for themselves and their families. In 1786, the General Assembly permitted North Haven to incorporate as a town, separate from New Haven. New roads were built to facilitate communication, namely the Hartford Turnpike in 1798 and the Middletown Turnpike in 1813.

The first United States census counted 1,236 people in the agricultural community of North Haven in 1790. However, the 1789 Grand List had found 1,620 sheep in North Haven, with the sheep outnumbering the residents.

By the middle of the nineteenth century, signs of the Industrial Revolution were apparent. In 1838, the New Haven and Hartford Railroad had laid its tracks along the level sand plains by the Quinnipiac River. In addition, small industries such as the manufacture of agricultural implements in Clintonville began in 1830. In the 1850 census, 62% of the population was listed as farmers. One-third of the residents worked in various nonagricultural occupations such as mechanics, brickmakers, and shoemakers.

After the Civil War, the expanding production of bricks, especially by the I.L. Stiles Co., brought immigrants to North Haven from Ireland, Germany, Italy, and Poland. By 1880, 11 out of 100 people had been born outside of the United States.

In the 1880s, Solomon Linsley, a North Haven architect, built the Memorial Town Hall and the new District 4 School. Linsley designed and built 32 Victorian style houses and public buildings in North Haven.

By 1900, public transportation was important to North Haven residents. Eighteen passenger trains stopped at the Broadway station every day. The Airline Railroad ran through Montowese and Clintonville to Middletown. Trolleys ran from Montowese to New Haven. After 1900, the line was extended north to Wallingford.

After World War I, the automobile changed life in this country town. The brickyards along the river were the major industry. However, residents who owned a car could live in North Haven and commute to New Haven for their jobs. Small real estate development began to grow up along the southern edge of town.

Significant population growth occurred at the end of World War II. North Haven's population increased rapidly, quadrupling between 1945 and 1970. The establishment of two factories, Pratt & Whitney and Marlin Firearms, spurred the subsequent population increase. This population shift necessitated the building of a new police station, firehouse, library, and five schools in the 1950s and 1960s to accommodate the needs of the growing community. The town continues to grow and expand until this day.

In spite of its rapid growth throughout the past few decades, however, this New England town still retains its town meeting form of government.

Those interested in an in-depth look at the history of North Haven should refer to Amidst Cultivated and Pleasant Fields: A Bicentennial History of North Haven, Connecticut by Lucy McTeer Brusic. Several copies are available to borrow at the North Haven Memorial Library.

== Geography ==
According to the United States Census Bureau, the town has a total area of 21.1 square miles (54.6 km^{2}), of which 20.8 square miles (53.8 km^{2}) is land and 0.3 square miles (0.8 km^{2}), or 1.52%, is water. North Haven is located less than 10 miles (16 km) from Long Island Sound.

North Haven is 27 miles (43 km) south of Hartford, 76 miles (122 km) northeast of New York City, 80 miles (130 km) west of Providence and 115 miles (185 km) southwest of Boston. The center of town is an area stretching along U.S. Route 5, from approximately its interchange with I-91 in the north to Bailey Road in the south.North Haven borders the City of New Haven and the towns of East Haven,Hamden, Branford, and Wallingford.

=== Principal communities ===
- North Haven Center
- Clintonville
- Montowese
- Green Acres
- Ridge Road

== Demographics ==
Historical population
Census	Pop.	Note	%±
1820	1,298		—
1850	1,325		—
1860	1,499		13.1%
1870	1,771		18.1%
1880	1,763		−0.5%
1890	1,862		5.6%
1900	2,164		16.2%
1910	2,254		4.2%
1920	1,968		−12.7%
1930	3,730		89.5%
1940	5,326		42.8%
1950	9,444		77.3%
1960	15,935		68.7%
1970	22,194		39.3%
1980	22,080		−0.5%
1990	22,247		0.8%
2000	23,035		3.5%
2010	24,093		4.6%
2020	24,253		0.7%
U.S. Decennial Census

In the 2010 decennial census, information on North Haven was organized according to the North Haven Census Designated Place (CDP), having an area of 20.8 square miles (54 km^{2}). As of the census of 2010, there were 24,093 people, 9,491 households, and 6,632 families residing in the town. The racial makeup of the town was 21,663 (89.9%) White, 725 (3%) Black or African American, 28 (0.1%) Native American, 1,132 (4.7%) Asian, 7 (0%) Pacific Islander, 211 (0.9%) from other races, and 327 (1.4%) from two or more races. Hispanic or Latino of any race were 1,023 (4.2%) of the population.

Of the 9,491 households in the North Haven CDP, 2,843 (30%) had children under the age of 18 living with them, 5,445 (57.4%) were married couples living together, 853 (9%) had a female householder with no husband present, and 2,503 (26.4%) were non-families. Of all households 2,133 (22.5%) were made up of individuals, and 1,170 (12.3%) had someone living alone who was 65 years of age or older. The average household size was 2.61, and the average family size was 3.09.

As of the 2010 census, there were 5,004 (20.8%) people under the age of 18; 1,680 (7%) from 18 to 24; 5,187 (21.5%) from 25 to 44; 7,430 (30.8%) from 45 to 64; and 4,693 (19.5%) who were 65 years of age or older, 5 of these being more than 100 years old. The median age was 45.5 years. Among the 24,093 people in the CDP, 11,569 (48%) were male and 12,524 (52%) female.

The 2019 median income for a household in the town was US$96,598, and the median income for a family was US$119,371; this compares to median values in 2010 of US$83,588 and US$94,916 (US$98,002 and US$111,283, respectively, in 2019 dollars). The per capita income for the town was $47,106 in 2019, as compared to $38,286 in 2010 ($44,888 in 2019 dollars). In 2019, men had a median income of US$63,030 versus US$44,826 for women; this can be compared to 2010 values of US$53,365 and US$33,075, respectively (US$114,901 and US$52,556, respectively, in 2019 dollars). The percent difference between the earnings of men and women narrowed between 2010 and 2019, going from 47% to 34%.

In 2010, about 2.0% of families lived below the poverty line; this had increased to about 3.5% by 2019, as compared to the state rate of about 6.8%. In 2010, about 924 (3.9%) individuals living below the poverty line; this had increased to about 1,183 (5%) in 2019, as compared to the state rate of about 344,146 (9.9%). For 2019, those people living below the poverty line included 281 (6.8%) people below 18 years of age and 239 (4.5%) people 65 years or older.

=== Political registration ===
The table below shows both party registration and activity. The increase ▲ decrease ▼ indicators refer to percentage changes in excess of 1%; where change has been <1%, the no change indicator was used.

	2000			2010			2020		
Party	Active	Inactive	Total (%)	Active	Inactive	Total (%)	Active	Inactive	Total (%)
Republican	4,516	155	4,671 (30.5%)	3,802	85	3,887 (24.1%) ▼	4,694	110	4,804 (25.6%) ▲
Democratic	2,832	149	2,981 (19.5%)	3,836	129	3,965 (24.6%) ▲	4,813	199	5,012 (26.7%) ▲
Unaffiliated	7,363	294	7,657 (50%)	7,922	342	8,264 (51.2%) ▲	8,406	282	8,688 (46.3%) ▼
Minor Parties	10	0	10 (0.1%)	19	1	20 (0.1%)	268	9	277 (1.5%) ▲
Total	14,721	598	15,319 (100%)	15,579	557	16,136 (100%)	18,181	600	18,781 (100%)

Minor parties represented in all three years 2000, 2010 and 2020 were the Green and Libertarian Parties. The Reform Party was represented in 2000, but was replaced by the Independent Party in 2010 and 2020.

== Economy ==
North Haven has a growing commercial, retailing and manufacturing base which employs approximately 12,640 people. There are more than 75 manufacturing and commercial firms in North Haven, 40 of which are assessed at over $1,000,000. North Haven has five industrial parks containing 490 acres (2.0 km^{2}), and hosts such corporate tenants as Connecticut Container Corp. and O.F. Mossberg & Sons. In 2013, Sustainable Building Systems, an international construction and tech firm, will consolidate its headquarters in North Haven, creating over 400 jobs. North Haven is a division headquarters for surgical device-maker Medtronic. In summer 2019, Amazon began operating an 855,000 square-foot fulfillment center in North Haven, providing over 1,500 jobs. The facility is capable of shipping over 1,000,000 items per day.

The economy of North Haven is also based on education. North Haven is home to several of Quinnipiac University's graduate schools. It is also the home to a branch of Gateway Community College and The University of Connecticut New Haven County Extension Center. North Haven is near Yale University and other New-Haven based schools, making it a popular place to live for university staff.

=== Top employers ===
Top employers in North Haven according to the town's 2023 Comprehensive Annual Financial Report

#	Employer	# of Employees
1	Amazon	
2	Medtronic	
3	Town of North Haven	
4	Quinnipiac University	
5	ACES - Area Cooperative Educational Services	
6	Brescome Barton	
7	O.F. Mossberg & Sons Inc.	
8	XPO Logistics	
9	Cowles Inc	
10	HB Communications Inc	

== Education ==
There are four public elementary schools in North Haven:

- Clintonville
- Green Acres
- Montowese
- Ridge Road

There is also one public middle school and one public high school:

- North Haven Middle School
- North Haven High School

Gateway Community College used to have a North Haven campus located on Bassett Road. The main campus building was originally part of the North Haven public school system until its sale to the college.

Quinnipiac University operates a 104-acre (0.42 km^{2}) graduate education campus in town. The university purchased the campus from Wellpoint, Inc. in September 2007. The university renovated an existing 180,000-square-foot (17,000 m^{2}) building on the campus, which now serves as home to the Frank H. Netter M.D. School of Medicine at Quinnipiac University, the School of Health Sciences, the School of Nursing, the School of Law, and the School of Education.

The University of Connecticut New Haven County Extension Center is also located in North Haven.

== Notable people ==
- David Apter (1924–2010), political scientist and sociologist
- Michael Barbaro (born 1979), journalist and host of The New York Times news podcast, The Daily
- Giovanni Calderón (born 2002), soccer player
- Joshua Calderón (1996), soccer player
- Charles H. Eglee (born 1951), television and film screenwriter and producer
- Dan Fegan (1962–2018), NBA agent, North Haven High School and Yale Law School alumni
- Kevin Gilbride (born 1951), former offensive coordinator, New York Giants
- Donald Kagan (1932–2021), historian and classicist at Yale University
- Paul Marcarelli (born 1970), actor and screenwriter
- John M. Merriman (1946–2022), Yale professor, French historian, and writer
- Tim O'Brien (born 1964), illustrator and President of the Society of Illustrators
- Barbara Ostfeld (born 1952), first female cantor to be ordained in Reform Judaism
- John Aristotle Phillips (born 1955), entrepreneur
- Ezra Stiles (1727–1795), president of Yale University
- David Vanacore, composer
- Tiffany Weimer (born 1983), soccer player

== In popular culture ==
The 2017 Hallmark Channel Christmas movie "Romance at Reindeer Lodge" was primarily filmed on location at a North Haven home.

== Notable sites ==
- Peter's Rock
- Quinnipiac River State Park
- Wharton Brook State Park

== See also ==
- Lancraft Fife and Drum Corps
