= Benji Flowers =

American soccer player (born 2011)

Personal information
- Full name: Benjamin Flowers
- Date of birth: April 14, 2011 (age 15)
- Place of birth: Longview, Texas, US
- Height: 5 ft 9 in (1.75 m)
- Positions: Winger; forward

Team information
- Current team: FC Dallas
- Number: 31

Youth career
- Dallas Texans SC
- 2023–2026: FC Dallas

Senior career*
Years	Team	Apps	(Gls)
2026	North Texas SC	4	(0)
2026–	FC Dallas	0	(0)
2026–	→ North Texas SC (loan)	6	(0)

International career
2026–	United States U15	3	(2)
- * Club domestic league appearances and goals as of 14:29, October 29, 2026 (UTC)

Benjamin Flowers (born April 14, 2011) is an American professional soccer player who plays as a winger or forward for Major League Soccer club FC Dallas.

== Early life ==
Flowers was born on April 14, 2011 in Longview, Texas. Born to a Mexican mother and an American father, he grew up in Forney, a part of the Dallas–Fort Worth metropolitan area.

Flowers began playing youth club soccer at the age of four. Flowers played for various soccer clubs around the Forney area, before joining Dallas Texans SC at the age of 10. After a year playing for Dallas Texans SC, Flowers was scouted by coaches from the FC Dallas Academy. Flowers went on trial with the academy, and upon joining he began playing with age group two years older than him. In 2025, he captained the club's under-14 team. The same year, he was promoted to their under-18 team.

After four years with the FC Dallas Academy, Flowers began training full time with FC Dallas' MLS Next Pro affiliate North Texas SC. Flowers also featured in scrimmages for the FC Dallas senior team.

== Club career ==
On March 21, 2026, Flowers debuted for North Texas SC in MLS Next Pro as an academy player during a 2–0 away loss to Houston Dynamo 2 in the league. Three months later, he was selected for the 2026 MLS Next All-Star Game.

On July 23, 2026, Flowers signed a professional contract with FC Dallas, becoming the youngest player to sign a homegrown contract with the club. The same month, it was reported that Premier League club Chelsea agreed to a deal to buy Flowers from FC Dallas when he turned 18-years-old.

== International career ==
Flowers is a Mexico youth international and has played for the United States U15 team, and Mexico U15 team. Flowers is eligible to represent both the United States and Mexico, with his eligibility for representing Mexico coming from his mother. On February 14, 2026, he debuted for the United States U15 during a 4–3 away friendly loss to England U15.

In August 2026, Flowers accepted a call-up to Mexico U16 national team by Yasser Corona for a seven game youth tournament the following month. During the tournament, Mexico would face the youth teams of Monterrey, LA Galaxy, Seattle Sounders, River Plate, Universidad Católica, Toluca, Pachuca, and Atlas.

== Style of play ==
Flowers plays as a winger or forward and is known for his speed and dribbling ability. American news website U.S. Soccer Collective wrote in 2025 that he "brings an appealing mix of athleticism, technical quality, and work rate that shows up consistently in his overall play. The next step in his development is improving consistency and precision in the final third".

== Personal life ==
Flowers' older brother Aaron Flowers plays as a cornerback for the Oregon Ducks football team. Flowers also enjoys playing American football, but he prefers soccer. Flowers is inspired by the playing style of Vinícius Júnior and Kylian Mbappé and wishes to emulate how they play the sport.

== Career statistics ==
As of match played September 20, 2026

Appearances and goals by club, season and competition
Club	Season	League			U.S. Open Cup		North America		Playoffs		Other		Total	
Club	Season	Division	Apps	Goals	Apps	Goals	Apps	Goals	Apps	Goals	Apps	Goals	Apps	Goals
North Texas SC	2026	MLS Next Pro	4	0	—		—		—		—		4	0
FC Dallas	2026	Major League Soccer	0	0	—		—		—		0	0	0	0
North Texas SC (loan)	2026	MLS Next Pro	6	0	—		—		—		—		6	0
Career total			10	0	0	0	0	0	0	0	0	0	10	0
