= Diego Garcia (disambiguation) =

Diego Garcia is an atoll in the Chagos Archipelago, a part of the British Indian Ocean Territory.

Diego Garcia may also refer to:

== Explorers and military ==
- Diego García de Paredes (1466–1534), Spanish soldier and duellist
- Diego García de Moguer (1484–1544), Spanish explorer for whom the island is named
- Diego García de Paredes (conquistador) (1506–1563), Spanish conquistador

== People in sport ==
=== Association football (soccer) ===
- Diego García (footballer, born 1907), Argentine footballer
- Diego García (footballer, born 1986), Argentine footballer
- Diego García (footballer, born 1987), Mexican footballer
- Diego García (footballer, born 1990), Spanish footballer
- Diego García (footballer, born 19 December 1996), Chilean footballer
- Diego García (footballer, born 29 December 1996), Uruguayan footballer
- Diego García (footballer, born 2000), Spanish footballer

=== Other sports ===
- Diego García (fencer) (1895-?), Spanish fencer
- Diego García (sport shooter) (born 1944), Mexican sports shooter
- Diego García Miravete (born 1946), Mexican gridiron football coach
- Diego García (runner) (1961–2001), Spanish long-distance athlete
- Diego García (basketball) (born 1979), Argentine professional basketball player
- Diego García (taekwondo) (born 1990), Mexican taekwondo practitioner
- Diego García (racewalker) (born 1996), Spanish race walker
- Diego García (racquetball), Argentine racquetball player

== Other people ==
- Diego José Abad y García (1727–1779), Jesuit poet and translator in Italy and New Spain
- Francisco García Diego y Moreno (often erroneously known as Diego Garcia, 1785–1846), Roman Catholic bishop in California
- Diego García Sayán (born 1950), Peruvian lawyer and politician, former foreign minister
- Diego Garcia (economist) (21st century), American economist
- Diego García (actor) (born 1983), Argentine actor
- Diego Garcia (Brazilian politician) (born 1984), Brazilian politician
- Diego Garcia (musician) (active since 2011), American musician, leader of the band Elefant

== Other uses ==
- Diego Garcia (novel), 2022 novel by Natasha Soobramanien and Luke Williams

== See also ==
- Dago García (born 1962), Colombian screenwriter
