= Nico Carrera =

Professional soccer player (born 2002)

Personal information
- Full name: Juan Nicolás Carrera Zarzar
- Date of birth: May 6, 2002 (age 24)
- Place of birth: Pachuca, Hidalgo, Mexico
- Height: 6 ft 3 in (1.90 m)
- Position: Center-back

Team information
- Current team: Atlante
- Number: 6

Youth career
- Pachuca
- 2017–2020: FC Dallas
- 2020–2021: Holstein Kiel

Senior career*
Years	Team	Apps	(Gls)
2019	North Texas SC	1	(0)
2021–2024	Holstein Kiel II	59	(4)
2022–2024	Holstein Kiel	2	(0)
2023	→ FSV Zwickau (loan)	9	(0)
2024–2025	Toluca	0	(0)
2025–	Atlante	41	(2)

International career^{‡}
2019	Mexico U17	1	(0)
2019	United States U17	4	(0)
2023–	United States U23	5	(0)
- * Club domestic league appearances and goals as of November 20, 2026 ‡ National team caps and goals as of October 7, 2019

Juan Nicolás Carrera Zarzar (born May 6, 2002) is a professional soccer player who plays as a center-back for Liga MX club Atlante. Born in Mexico, he represents the United States internationally.

== Club career ==
After a youth career that began with Pachuca and FC Dallas, Carrera made his pro club debut with North Texas SC in USL League One in 2019. In July 2020, he signed with Kiel and began his career in Germany on their team in the Under 19 Bundesliga.

On January 26, 2023, Carrera joined FSV Zwickau on loan.

On July 9, 2024, Holstein Kiel announced Carrera's move to Toluca.

== International career ==
Carrera played for the Mexico national under-17 team before gaining American citizenship. He represented the United States under-17 team at the 2019 FIFA U-17 World Cup.

== Personal life ==
Nico is the older brother of Antonio Carrera, who is also a professional soccer player.

== Honours ==
Toluca

- Liga MX: Clausura 2025
