= Diego Garcia (economist) =

American financial economist

Diego García is an American financial economist. He is the Burridge Endowed Chair in Finance in the Leeds School of Business.

== Early career ==
García received his BBA from the Asturias Business School in Asturias in northwest Spain. He earned his PhD in business administration from the University of California Berkeley's Haas School of Business in 2000. He began his academic career as an assistant professor of finance at the Tuck School of Business at Dartmouth College. He moved to the Kenan-Flagler Business School at the University of North Carolina-Chapel Hill, and in 2012, was promoted to tenured associate professor. In 2015 he was recruited to the University of Colorado as the Burridge Endowed Chair in Finance.

== Research ==
García's research focuses on information economics and behavioral finance. He is best known for research showing that information that should be irrelevant to stock prices affects the market. Edmans, García, and Norli document that national stock markets suffer significant negative returns on the days following the loss of the national team in an international sports event. A national team loss in a World Cup elimination game is followed by nearly a 0.5% percent decline in the national stock market the following day.

García pioneered the use of text analytic methods to study the effects of financial journalists on stock prices. The dominant efficient-market hypothesis holds that stock prices reflect all available information in the market. Financial journalists are primarily just repeating news that has been revealed elsewhere, so by conventional theory, their columns should not move prices. Dougal, García Engelberg, and Parsons examined the impact of the Wall Street Journal’s “Abreast of the Market” column on subsequent daily Dow Jones Industrial Average returns. The “Abreast of the Market” column is written by a rotating set of columnists —typically three in the same month— who tend to write on predictable schedules. Some columnists are much more bearish than others over time and some more bullish. The authors show that even though these columns are purely opinion pieces with no news content, bullish columnists tend to move the DJIA up a few basis points and bearish columnists move it downward. The paper received the Michael Brennan Award for best paper in the Review of Financial Studies.

In subsequent work, García examined the impact of articles from two New York Times financial news columns over a 100-year period using natural language processing tools to measure the pessimism in each article. He finds that the impact on the market return of the pessimism of these articles on the stock market is much greater during recessions. Negative articles in the morning paper led to lower market returns that day. Positive articles led to higher returns that day. These movements partially reverse over the next few days, suggesting that they were not driven by fundamental news.
