= Sidney Paris =

Puerto Rican footballer (born 2002)

Personal information
- Full name: Sidney Theodore Paris
- Date of birth: April 26, 2002 (age 24)
- Place of birth: Oakville, Ontario, Canada
- Height: 5 ft 11 in (1.80 m)
- Positions: Defender; winger

Team information
- Current team: St. Louis City 2

Youth career
- Ascot United
- Real Madrid
- Chicago FC United
- Chicago Fire
- Vaughan Azzurri
- Toronto FC

College career
Years	Team	Apps	(Gls)
2020–2021	Navy Midshipmen	24	(4)
2022–2024	Wake Forest Demon Deacons	44	(4)

Senior career*
Years	Team	Apps	(Gls)
2022	North Carolina Fusion U23	8	(1)
2023–2024	AFC Ann Arbor	7	(4)
2025	Sigüeiro	10	(0)
2026–	St. Louis City 2	19	(1)

International career^{‡}
2023–	Puerto Rico	20	(0)
- * Club domestic league appearances and goals as of September 29, 2026 ‡ National team caps and goals as of September 29, 2026

Sidney Theodore Paris, also known as Sidbey (born April 26, 2002) is a footballer who plays as a forward who currently plays for St. Louis City 2 in MLS Next Pro. Born in Canada, he plays for the Puerto Rico national team.

== Early life ==
During his youth, Paris played youth soccer in seven countries, including Ascot United in England, Real Madrid in Spain, Chicago FC United and the Chicago Fire in the United States, and Vaughan Azzurri and the Toronto FC Academy in Canada.

== College career ==
In 2020, Paris began attending the United States Naval Academy, where he played for the men's soccer team. On August 26, 2021, he scored his first collegiate goal in a 2-2 draw with the UMBC Retrievers. In late September 2021, he was named the Patriot League Offensive Player of the Week. At the end of the 2021 season, he was named to the All-Patriot League First Team.

In 2022, he transferred to Wake Forest University, joining the men's soccer team. He was named to the ACC Academic Honor Roll and All-ACC Academic Team each season, as well as the ACC Top Six For Service in 2023.

== Club career ==
In 2022, Paris played with North Carolina Fusion U23 in USL League Two. In 2023, he began playing with AFC Ann Arbor.

In 2025, he joined Spanish club Sigüeiro in the sixth tier Prefrente de Galicia.

In February 2026, he signed with St. Louis City 2 in MLS Next Pro for the 2026 season, with an option through June 2027. On August 28, 2026, he scored his first professional goal, in a match against North Texas SC.

== International career ==
In March 2023, Paris was called up to the Puerto Rico national team for their CONCACAF Nations League matches. He made his international debut on March 23 against the British Virgin Islands. In April 2023, he was named to the CONCACAF Nations League Best XI for League C for his performances.

== Career statistics ==
As of October 17, 2026

Appearances and goals by club, season and competition
Club	Season	League			Playoffs		Domestic Cup		Other		Total	
Club	Season	Division	Apps	Goals	Apps	Goals	Apps	Goals	Apps	Goals	Apps	Goals
North Carolina Fusion U23	2022	USL League Two	8	1	0	0	0	0	—		8	1
AFC Ann Arbor	2023	USL League Two	2	1	0	0	—		—		2	1
AFC Ann Arbor	2024	USL League Two	5	3	—		—		—		5	3
AFC Ann Arbor	Total		7	4	0	0	0	0	0	0	7	4
Sigüeiro	2024–25	Prefrente de Galicia	10	0	—		—		1	0	11	0
St. Louis City 2	2026	MLS Next Pro	19	1	1	0	—		—		20	1
Career total			34	6	1	0	0	0	1	0	36	6
