= Antonio Carrera =

American soccer player (born 2004)

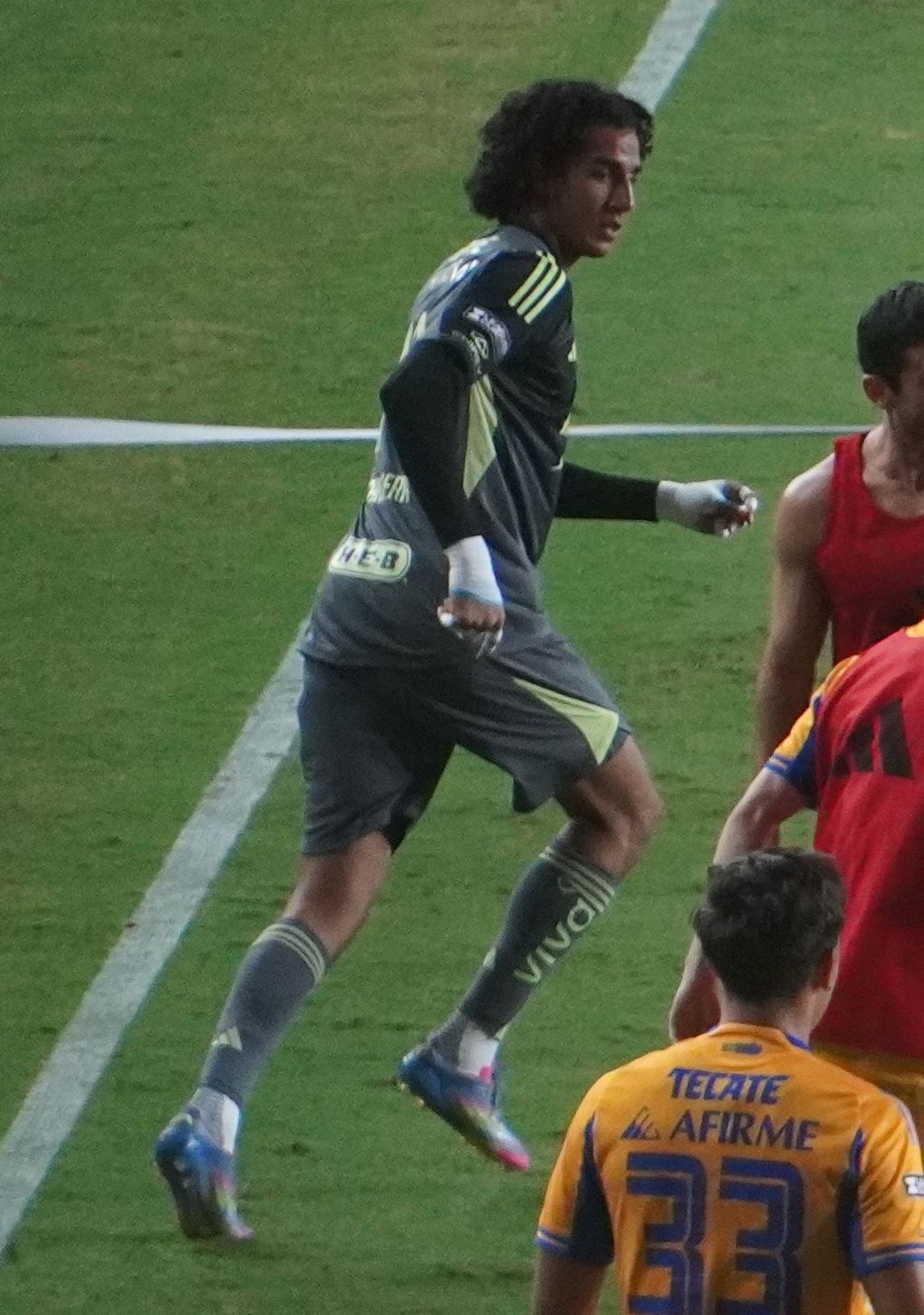
- Carrera with UANL in 2025

Personal information
- Full name: Juan Antonio Carrera Zarzar
- Date of birth: March 15, 2004 (age 22)
- Place of birth: Pachuca, Mexico
- Height: 6 ft 3 in (1.91 m)
- Position: Goalkeeper

Team information
- Current team: Tigres UANL
- Number: 13

Youth career
- 2014–2021: FC Dallas

Senior career*
Years	Team	Apps	(Gls)
2021–2025	North Texas SC	43	(0)
2022–2025	FC Dallas	0	(0)
2024	→ North Carolina FC (loan)	4	(0)
2025–	UANL	0	(0)

International career^{‡}
2022	United States U19	5	(0)
2022–2023	United States U20	4	(0)
2023	United States U23	3	(0)
- * Club domestic league appearances and goals as of November 21, 2026 ‡ National team caps and goals as of 21:07, January 7, 2025 (UTC)

Juan Antonio Carrera Zarzar (born March 15, 2004) is a professional soccer player who plays as a goalkeeper for the Liga MX side Tigres UANL. Born in Mexico, he is a youth international for the United States.

== Career ==
A youth product of FC Dallas since 2014, Carrera started training with the senior squad in the preseason of 2021 and started making appearances on the bench for their reserve club North Texas SC in the MLS Next Pro. On February 22, 2022, he signed a contract as a Homegrown Player with FC Dallas until 2024 with options for 2025 and 2026. On February 22, 2024, Carrera was loaned to North Carolina FC in the USL Championship. On June 19, 2024, he was recalled to FC Dallas after 4 appearances with North Carolina.

On June 20, 2025, Carrera joined Liga MX side Tigres UANL for an undisclosed fee.

== International career ==
Born in Mexico, Carrera moved to the United States at a young age and is a dual-citizen. He was part of the United States U20 squad that won the 2022 CONCACAF U-20 Championship. He was again called up to the United States U20s for the 2023 FIFA U-20 World Cup. He was called up to the United States U23s for the 2023 Pan American Games.

== Personal life ==
Antonio is the younger brother of Nico Carrera, who is also a professional soccer player.

== Honours ==
North Texas SC

- MLS Next Pro: 2024

United States U20

- CONCACAF U-20 Championship: 2022

Individual

- MLS Next Pro Save of the Year: 2022
