= Takoradi Technical Institute =

- TTI
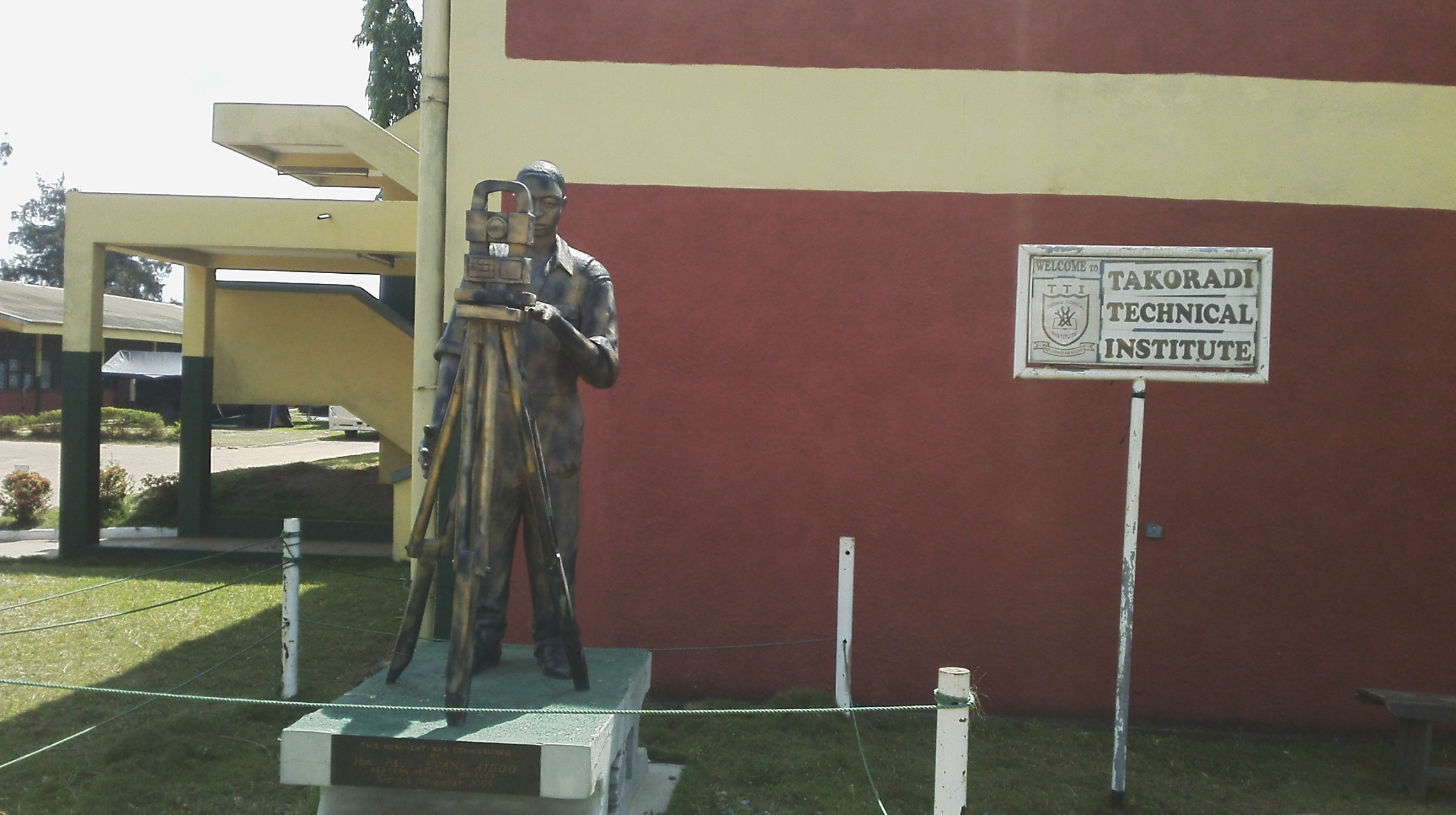

Location
- Effiakuma Sekondi-Takoradi; Sekondi-Takoradi, Western Region; Ghana

Information
- Type: Technical
- Motto: Perseverance And Success
- Established: 1982
- Status: Active
- School district: Effia Kwesimintsim Municipal Assembly (EKMA)
- Administrator: Mark Mensah Nyan
- Principal: Mr Samuel Obeng Peprah
- Teaching staff: 70
- Grades: Form 1 to 3
- Gender: Coed
- Enrollment: 1200+
- Campus: Non-residential
- Athletics: Track and field
- Traditional colors: Cream
- Uniform color

Takoradi Technical Institute is a mixed-sex school found in Takoradi.The school was established in 1982 with the collaboration of the Ghanaian Government and German Government Support for Technical Cooperation. The school is popular for its facilities which are used to train and enhance the technical skills of the students.

== History ==
Takoradi Technical Institute (T.T.I) was established in 1982 and started with 32 students. The students in the past wore blue shirts and khaki shorts.

== Departments ==
- Welding and Fabrication Technology
- Electrical Engineering Technology
- Hospitality and Catering Management
- Automotive Engineering Technology
- Building And Construction Technology
- Fashion Design Technology
- Refrigeration and Air-conditioning Technology
- Plumbing And Gas Fitting Technology
- Mechanical engineering
- Computer Technology
- Information Technology
- Digital Design Technology
- Business Administration
- Electronics Engineering

== Houses ==
There are six houses to which every student belongs to, these houses are:

- Tewiah House
- Yankey House
- Boafo House
- Sekyi Ahyia House - blue
- Brempong Yaw House
- German House
