= Aaron Essel =

Ghanaian footballer (born 2005)

- Essel in 2026

Personal information
- Date of birth: 30 July 2005 (age 21)
- Place of birth: Sekondi-Takoradi, Ghana
- Height: 1.79 m (5 ft 10 in)
- Position: Defender

Team information
- Current team: Sacramento Republic (on loan from St Johnstone)
- Number: 15

Senior career*
| Years | Team | Apps | (Gls) |
| 2021–2024 | Bechem United | 69 | (0) |
| 2024– | St Johnstone | 15 | (0) |
| 2025 | → North Texas SC (loan) | 16 | (2) |
| 2026– | → Sacramento Republic (loan) | 18 | (1) |

International career^{‡}
| 2022– | Ghana U20 | 8 | (0) |
| 2023 | Ghana U23 | 3 | (0) |
| 2025– | Ghana | 1 | (0) |
- * Club domestic league appearances and goals as of 11:53, 11 November 2026 (UTC) ‡ National team caps and goals as of 30 June 2023

Aaron Essel (born 30 July 2005) is a Ghanaian professional footballer who plays as defender for USL Championship side Sacramento Republic, on loan from Scottish Premiership side St Johnstone, and is also a part of the Ghana national team.

== Early life ==
Essel attended St. John's School, Sekondi, where he captained and played for the school's football team, leading them to the final of the Western Regional Inter-schools and Colleges Super Zonals Boys Soccer Competition but lost the tournament to Takoradi Technical Institute via a 6–5 scoreline on penalty shootouts after a goalless draw at the end of extra time.

== Career ==
In March 2021, Essel joined Bechem United during the second round transfer period for the 2020–21 season. On 4 April 2021, he made his debut after playing the full 90 minutes in a 2–0 victory over Liberty Professionals. He played the full 90 minutes in their comfortable 4–0 home victory over rivals Aduana Stars on 18 April 2021.

== International career ==
In May 2025, Essel was called up to the Ghana national team for the 2025 Unity Cup.
