= Jack Clarkson =

Australian rules footballer

Personal information
- Full name: Jack H. Clarkson
- Born: 28 February 1935 (age 91)
- Original team: North Essendon Methodists
- Height: 173 cm (5 ft 8 in)
- Weight: 71 kg (157 lb)
- Positions: Rover, back pocket

Playing career^{1}
Years	Club	Games (Goals)
1956, 1958	Essendon	5 (1)
- ^{1} Playing statistics correct to the end of 1958.

Jack Clarkson (born 28 February 1935) is a former Australian rules footballer who played with Essendon in the Victorian Football League (VFL). He also played with Coburg in the Victorian Football Association (VFA).
