= Jaidyn Contreras =

American soccer player (born 2007)

Personal information
- Full name: Jaidyn D' Alesandro Contreras Tavares
- Date of birth: September 26, 2007 (age 19)
- Place of birth: Houston, Texas, United States
- Height: 1.79 m (5 ft 10 in)
- Positions: Midfielder; winger

Team information
- Current team: Tigres
- Number: 29

Youth career
- –2015: Klein Soccer Club
- 2015–2016: Texas Rush Soccer Club
- 2016–2022: Houston Dynamo
- 2022–2024: FC Dallas
- 2026–: Tigres

Senior career*
Years	Team	Apps	(Gls)
2024–2026	North Texas SC	42	(3)
2026–	FC Dallas	0	(0)
2026–	→ Tigres (loan)	0	(0)

International career^{‡}
2025	United States U18	3	(2)
2025	Honduras U20	4	(1)
2026–	United States U20	6	(0)
- * Club domestic league appearances and goals ‡ National team caps and goals as of 9 August 2026

Jaidyn D' Alesandro Contreras Tavares (born 26 September 2007) is a professional footballer who plays as a midfielder or winger for Tigres. Born in the United States, he has represented the United States and Honduras internationally at youth level.

== Early life ==
Contreras was born on 26 September 2007. Born in Houston, Texas, United States, he was born to a Mexican father and a Honduran mother and is a native of Sugar Land, Texas, United States.

== Club career ==
As a youth player, Contreras joined the youth academy of American side Klein Soccer Club. Following his stint here, he joined the youth academy of Texas Rush Soccer Club in the United States in 2015. One year later, he joined the youth academy of American outfit Houston Dynamo.

Subsequently, he joined the youth academy of FC Dallas in the United States in 2022 and was promoted to the club's reserve team in 2024, where he made forty-two league appearances and scored three goals. In 2026, he signed for Mexican club Tigres.

== International career ==
Contreras is a United States and Honduras youth international and has represented the former internationally at under-18 and under-20 level and the latter internationally at under-20 level and has eligible to represent Mexico internationally through his father.

Altogether, he made three appearances and scored two goals while playing for the United States men's national under-18 soccer team and four appearances and scored one goal while playing for the Honduras national under-20 football team. During the summer of 2026, he played for the United States men's national under-20 soccer team at the 2026 CONCACAF U-20 Championship.

== Style of play ==
Contreras plays as a midfielder or winger and is right-footed. Mexican news website Telediario Mx wrote in 2026 he "primarily plays as an attacking winger, positioning himself as a sharp, direct attacker with the ability to play on his natural or switched side on either wing. His speed in one-on-one situations, combined with his ability to supply balls to the area, represents a fresh tool".
