= James Bulkeley (footballer) =

New Zealand footballer (born 2005)

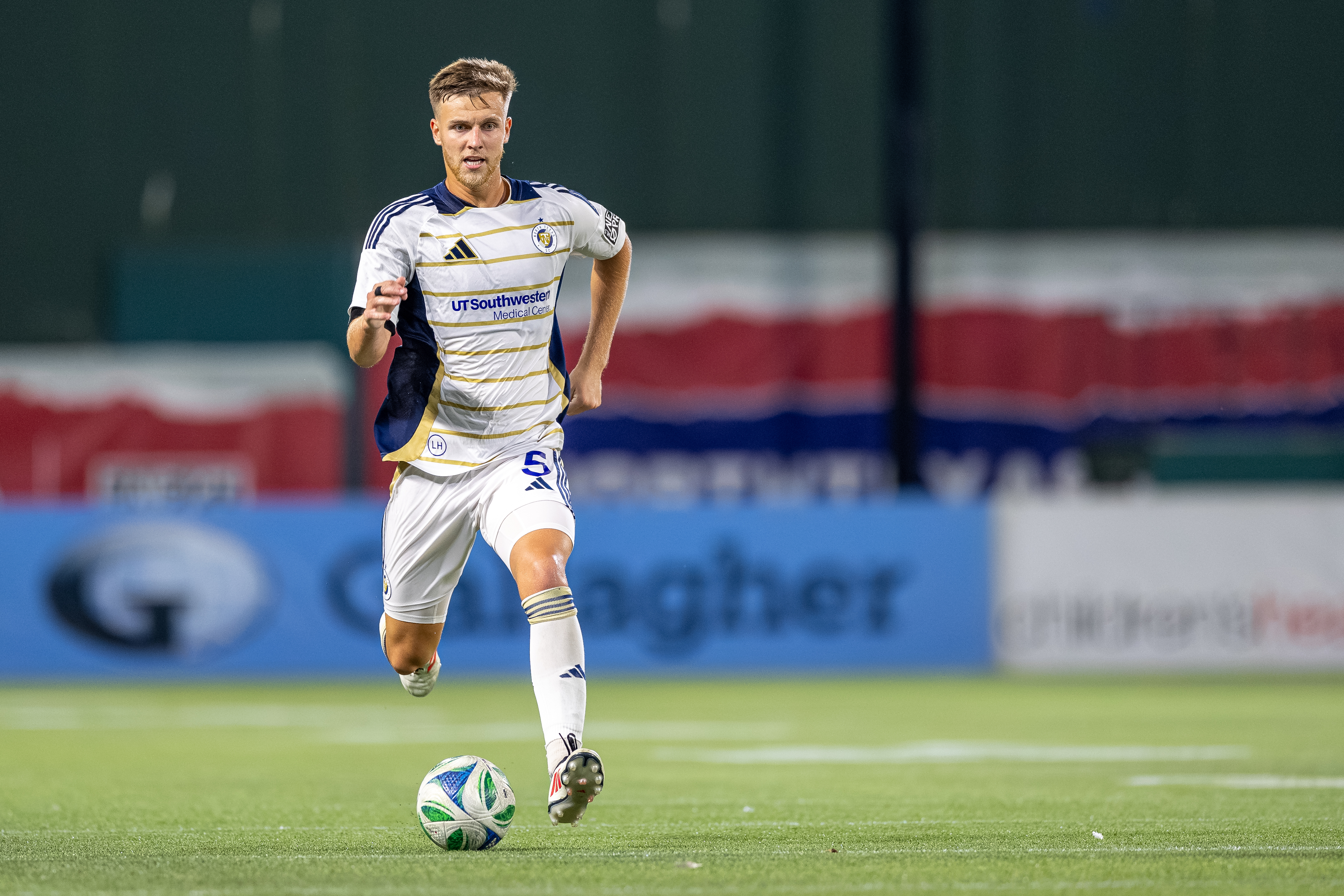
- Bulkeley vs Ventura County in 2025

Personal information
- Full name: James Andrew Bulkeley
- Date of birth: 14 May 2005 (age 21)
- Place of birth: Napier, New Zealand
- Height: 1.91 m (6 ft 3 in)
- Position: Centre-back

Team information
- Current team: Finn Harpes FC
- Number: 45

Youth career
- Fleetwood United
- Mounties Wanderers
- Hakoah Sydney City East

Senior career*
Years	Team	Apps	(Gls)
2023–2024	Fleetwood United	13	(0)
2024–2025	Gulf United	7	(0)
2025	North Texas	11	(0)
2026–	Western Springs	5	(0)

International career
2024–2025	New Zealand U20	6	(1)
Medal record
Men's football
Representing New Zealand
OFC U-19 Championship
Winner	2024 Samoa
- * Club domestic league appearances and goals

James Andrew Bulkeley (born 14 May 2005) is a New Zealand professional footballer who plays as a centre-back for Finn Harpes FC who compete in the League of Ireland First Division.

== Club career ==
=== Fleetwood United ===
In August 2023, Bulkeley signed with UAE Second Division League club and Fleetwood Town FC sister club Fleetwood United FC for the 23/24 season. He made thirteen league appearances as the club went on to win the league title and achieved promotion to the UAE First Division League at the end of the season.

=== Gulf United ===
In August 2024, ahead of the 2024–25 season, Bulkeley signed for Gulf United FC, who compete in the UAE First Division League. He made his league debut on 14 September 2024 in a 1–1 draw against Al Dhaid. During his time with the club, Bulkeley made seven league appearances and featured once in the UAE President's Cup, playing in a 2–0 defeat to United FC. He left the club in January 2025.

=== North Texas SC ===
In January 2025, Bulkeley signed a one-year deal with a club option for a second year in 2026 with North Texas SC, the reserve team of FC Dallas, competing in MLS Next Pro. He made his debut on 14 March 2025 against the Vancouver Whitecaps FC 2 in a 3–2 win, coming on as a substitute in the 70th minute. Over the season, Bulkeley made 11 league appearances for the club, contributing to North Texas SC clinching a playoff spot.

== International career ==
=== New Zealand U-20 ===
In 2024, Bulkeley was called up to the New Zealand under-19 squad to play in the OFC U-19 Men's Championship that took place in Samoa in July 2024. Bulkeley played in four of the five matches, scoring one goal against New Caledonia in their 4–0 victory in the final, winning the championship.

Bulkeley was named as part of the 21-player New Zealand U-20 squad for the 2025 FIFA U-20 World Cup that took place in Chile from September to October 2025. Bulkeley made two appearances in the tournament, with New Zealand exiting after the conclusion of the group stage.

== Personal life ==
Bulkeley is of Australian descent and holds Australian nationality

== Honours ==
=== International ===
New Zealand U20

- OFC U-19 Championship: 2024
