= Giovanni Calderón =

Puerto Rican footballer (born 2002)

Personal information
- Full name: Giovanni Dwight Calderón Chaparro
- Date of birth: February 8, 2002 (age 24)
- Place of birth: North Haven, Connecticut, U.S.
- Height: 1.91 m (6 ft 3 in)
- Position: Defender

Team information
- Current team: Real Monarchs
- Number: 55

Youth career
- 2010–2013: Connecticut FC Impact
- 2014–2015: FC Westchester
- 2016–2017: Beachside SC
- 2017–2018: D.C. United
- 2018–2019: New York City FC
- 2019–2020: Beachside SC
- 2020–2021: Nomads SC

College career
Years	Team	Apps	(Gls)
2021	Navy Midshipmen	3	(0)
2022–2024	Cal State Fullerton Titans	40	(1)

Senior career*
Years	Team	Apps	(Gls)
2021	Hartford Athletic	0	(0)
2021	AC Connecticut	3	(0)
2022	Ventura County Fusion	20	(0)
2024	New England Revolution II	0	(0)
2025–	Real Monarchs	0	(0)

International career^{‡}
2019	Puerto Rico U17	8	(0)
2018	Puerto Rico U20	10	(0)
2019–	Puerto Rico	7	(0)
- * Club domestic league appearances and goals as of 14:19; March 28, 2023 (UTC) ‡ National team caps and goals as of 20:12; March 28, 2023 (UTC)

Giovanni Dwight Calderón Chaparro (born February 8, 2002) is a footballer who plays as a defender for the MLS Next Pro club Real Monarchs. Born in the United States, he plays for the Puerto Rico national team.

== Early life ==
Calderón was born in North Haven, Connecticut to a Colombian father and Puerto Rican mother.

== Club career ==
=== Early career ===
Calderón first took an interest in soccer from the age of three, and joined his first club, Connecticut Football Club Impact, at the age of eight, playing alongside ten year olds. He played youth soccer for FC Westchester, before going on to play for a number of academy sides, including professional clubs D.C. United and New York City FC.

=== College soccer ===
Calderón was given a scholarship worth $5,000 from the New York Red Bulls in November 2018.

He played for the United States Naval Academy's soccer team, the Navy Midshipmen, in 2021. He then transferred to the California State University, Fullerton, where he again represented the university in soccer and captaining the side.

=== Professional ===
In May 2021, he signed a contract with Hartford Athletic of the USL Championship, following a trial in March of the same year. He became the first player in the club's history to sign a USL Academy Contract, which allowed him to keep his collegiate eligibility while remaining eligible to represent Hartford Athletic in USL competitions, having already committed to playing for the Navy Midshipmen in December 2020.

Despite this, he went on to play for AC Connecticut in the USL League Two in the same month. He made three appearances for AC Connecticut, before signing with the Ventura County Fusion for 2022 - going on to make five appearances in the league and five in the playoffs. While at Ventura County Fusion, he captained the side and won the 2022 USL 2 National Championship.

On July 6, 2024, he signed with New England Revolution II of MLS Next Pro.

== International career ==
Calderón made his senior international debut for Puerto Rico on September 6, 2019, in a 4–0 friendly loss to Honduras.

== Personal life ==
He has two elder brothers, Joshua and Neekoli, both of whom played soccer, with Joshua also representing the Puerto Rico national football team.

== Career statistics ==
=== Club ===
As of 28 March 2023

Appearances and goals by club, season and competition
Club	Season	League			Cup		Other		Total	
Club	Season	Division	Apps	Goals	Apps	Goals	Apps	Goals	Apps	Goals
Hartford Athletic	2021	USL Championship	0	0	0	0	0	0	0	0
AC Connecticut	2021	USL League Two	3	0	0	0	0	0	3	0
Ventura County Fusion	2022	USL League Two	5	0	0	0	5 (Note: Appearances in the playoffs)	0	10	0
Career total			8	0	0	0	5	0	13	0

=== International ===
As of matches played 28 March 2023

Appearances and goals by national team and year
National team	Year	Apps	Goals
Puerto Rico	2019	3	0
Puerto Rico	2023	2	0
Total		5	0
