= 2021 San Jose Earthquakes season =

San Jose Earthquakes
2021 season
- Head coach: Matías Almeyda
- Stadium: PayPal Park; San Jose, California
- MLS: Conference: 10th Overall: 21st
- U.S. Open Cup: Canceled
- Heritage Cup: TBD
- Highest home attendance: 18,000 (6/26 v. LAG)
- Lowest home attendance: 5,000 (5/12 v. SEA)
- Average home league attendance: 12,101
- Biggest win: SJ 4–0 ATX (10/20)
- Biggest defeat: ORL 5–0 SJ (6/22)
Home colors	Away colors

The 2021 season was the San Jose Earthquakes' 39th year of existence, their 24th season in Major League Soccer and their 14th consecutive season in the top-flight of American soccer.

== Transfers ==
=== In ===
No.	Pos.	Player	Previous club	Fee/notes	Date
9	MF	(Mexico) Javier López	(Mexico) C.D. Guadalajara	Loan	January 20, 2021
5	MF	(Argentina) Eric Remedi	(United States) Atlanta United FC	Trade	February 15, 2021
28	FW	(United States) Benji Kikanović	(United States) Reno 1868 FC	Free Transfer	February 16, 2021
2	DF	(Argentina) Luciano Abecasis	(Paraguay) Club Libertad	Free transfer	February 17, 2021
—	FW	(United States) Thomas Williamson	(United States) California Golden Bears	2021 MLS SuperDraft pick	April 23, 2021
—	MF	(Ghana) George Asomani	(United States) NC State Wolfpack	2021 MLS SuperDraft pick	June 4, 2021
13	DF	(Brazil) Nathan	(Switzerland) FC Zürich	Undisclosed fee	June 25, 2021
11	FW	(United States) Jeremy Ebobisse	(United States) Portland Timbers	Trade	August 5, 2021

=== Draft picks ===
Draft picks are not automatically signed to the team roster. Only those who are signed to a contract will be listed as transfers in.

Date	Player	Position	College	Pick	Source
January 21, 2021	(United States) Thomas Williamson	FW	UC Berkeley	12	
January 21, 2021	(Ghana) George Asomani	MF	NC State	39	

=== Transfers out ===
No.	Pos.	Player	Transferred to	Fee/notes	Date
9	FW	(Netherlands) Danny Hoesen	(United States) Austin FC	Out of contract; 2020 MLS Expansion Draft	December 4, 2020
37	DF	(Georgia (country)) Guram Kashia	(Georgia (country)) FC Locomotive Tbilisi	Option declined	December 4, 2020
11	MF	(Georgia (country)) Valeri Qazaishvili	(South Korea) Ulsan Hyundai FC	Option declined	December 4, 2020
96	MF	(United States) Luis Felipe	(United States) Sacramento Republic FC	Option declined	December 4, 2020
24	DF	(United States) Nick Lima	(United States) Austin FC	Trade	December 13, 2020
23	DF	(Germany) Florian Jungwirth	(Canada) Vancouver Whitecaps FC	Trade	August 6, 2021

=== Loans Out ===
No.	Pos.	Player	Loaned to	Date until	Date
—	FW	(United States) Thomas Williamson	(United States) Pittsburgh Riverhounds SC	End of season	April 23, 2021
35	DF	(United States) Gilbert Fuentes	(United States) Austin Bold FC	End of season	May 3, 2021
77	DF	(United States) Casey Walls	(United States) Austin Bold FC	End of season	May 3, 2021
26	MF	(El Salvador) Eric Calvillo	(United States) Orange County SC	End of season	June 18, 2021

== Competitions ==
=== Friendlies ===
April 2 Preseason	San Jose Earthquakes	6–1	Sacramento Republic	San Jose, California
PDT				Stadium: PayPal Park; Attendance: Closed door

October 7 Midseason	San Jose Earthquakes	2–0	Cruz Azul	San Jose, California
PDT	Nathan (red card) 39'; Wondolowski (yellow card) 39'; Thompson (yellow card) 56'; Marie; Espinoza 72' (Ebobisse)	Report	Martinez (yellow card) 25'; Montoya (yellow card) 37'; Rodríguez (red card) 39'	Stadium: PayPal Park; Attendance: 12,029

=== Major League Soccer ===
==== Standings ====
===== Overall =====
Pos	Team	Pld	W	L	T	GF	GA	GD	Pts
19	Los Angeles FC	34	12	13	9	53	51	+2	45
20	Inter Miami CF	34	12	17	5	36	53	−17	41
21	San Jose Earthquakes	34	10	13	11	46	54	−8	41
22	Chicago Fire FC	34	9	18	7	36	54	−18	34
23	FC Dallas	34	7	15	12	47	56	−9	33

Source: MLS
Rules for classification: 1) points; 2) total wins; 3) total goal differential; 4) total goals scored; 5) fewer disciplinary points; 6) away goal differential; 7) away goals scored; 8) home goals differential; 9) home goals scored; 10) coin toss (2 clubs tied) or drawing of lots (≥3 clubs tied)

===== Western Conference =====
Pos	Team	Pld	W	L	T	GF	GA	GD	Pts
8	LA Galaxy	34	13	12	9	50	54	−4	48
9	Los Angeles FC	34	12	13	9	53	51	+2	45
10	San Jose Earthquakes	34	10	13	11	46	54	−8	41
11	FC Dallas	34	7	15	12	47	56	−9	33
12	Austin FC	34	9	21	4	35	56	−21	31

Source: MLS
Rules for classification: 1) points; 2) total wins; 3) total goal differential; 4) total goals scored; 5) fewer disciplinary points; 6) away goal differential; 7) away goals scored; 8) home goals differential; 9) home goals scored; 10) coin toss (2 clubs tied) or drawing of lots (≥3 clubs tied)

==== Regular season ====
Win Draw Loss Postponed

April 16 1	Houston Dynamo FC	2–1	San Jose Earthquakes	Houston, Texas
5:00 PM PDT	Picault (yellow card) 29'; Rodríguez 39'; Vera (yellow card) 41'; Urruti 56'; Jones (yellow card) 90+4'	Report	M. López (yellow card) 51'; Remedi (yellow card) 52'; Marie 74'; Ríos (yellow card) 87'	Stadium: BBVA Stadium; Attendance: 6,376; Referee: Armando Villarreal

April 24 2	San Jose Earthquakes	3–1	FC Dallas	San Jose, California
12:30 PM PDT	Alanís 34' (pen.); J. López (yellow card) 45'; Espinoza 49'; Fierro (yellow card) 53'; Cowell 59'; Salinas (yellow card) 75'; Wondolowski (red card) 89'; Remedi (yellow card) 90+4'	Report	Hollingshead (yellow card) 16'; Acosta (yellow card) 25'; Tessmann (yellow card) 33'; Pepi 79'	Stadium: PayPal Park; Referee: Timothy Ford

May 1 3	San Jose Earthquakes	4–1	D.C. United	San Jose, California
8:00 PM PDT	J. López 1' (yellow card) 69'; Cowell 26'; Marie (yellow card) 35'; Yueill 43' 85'; Remedi (yellow card) 88'	Report	Alfaro (yellow card) 18' (goal) 31'; Nyeman (yellow card) 68'	Stadium: PayPal Park; Referee: Kevin Stott

May 7 4	Real Salt Lake	1–2	San Jose Earthquakes	Sandy, Utah
6:30 PM PDT	Kreilach (yellow card) 1'; Rubin 43'; Rusnák (yellow card) 49'; Meram (yellow card) 50'; Besler (yellow card) 86'	Report	Remedi (yellow card) 21'; Wondolowski 83' 87'	Stadium: Rio Tinto Stadium; Attendance: 10,448; Referee: Fotis Bazakos

May 12 5	San Jose Earthquakes	0–1	Seattle Sounders FC	San Jose, California
7:30 PM PDT	Wondolowski (yellow card) 73'; Abecasis (yellow card) 80'	Report	Roldan 18'; Ruidíaz (yellow card) 39'; Frei (yellow card) 78'	Stadium: PayPal Park; Attendance: 5,000; Referee: Baldomero Toledo

May 15 6	San Jose Earthquakes	0–2	Portland Timbers	San Jose, California
7:30 PM PDT	Wondolowski (yellow card) 45'	Report	Chara 5'; Tuiloma (yellow card) 25'; Zuparic (yellow card) 42'; Loria 74'	Stadium: PayPal Park; Attendance: 5,000; Referee: Timothy Ford

May 22 7	San Jose Earthquakes	1–3	Sporting Kansas City	San Jose, California
7:00 PM PDT	J. López 4'; Espinoza (yellow card) 9'; Ríos (yellow card) 49'	Report	Lindsey 15' (yellow card) 90'; Pulido 60'; Sallói 75'	Stadium: PayPal Park; Referee: Allen Chapman

May 29 8	LA Galaxy	1–0	San Jose Earthquakes	Carson, California
4:00 PM PDT	Santos (yellow card) 43'; Araujo (yellow card) 49'; Grandsir 70'; Kljestan (yellow card) 84'	Report	Tavares (yellow card) 29'	Stadium: Dignity Health Sports Park; Attendance: unknown Referee: Joe Dickerson
Note: The goal scored by the Galaxy in the 70th minute was an own goal from a deflection off of Tanner Beason. Samuel Grandsir was the last Galaxy player who touched the ball

June 19 9	Austin FC	0–0	San Jose Earthquakes	Austin, Texas
6:00 PM PDT	Stroud (yellow card) 44'	Report	Jungwirth (yellow card) 15'; Remedi (yellow card) 25'	Stadium: Q2 Stadium; Referee: Ismail Elfath

June 22 10	Orlando City SC	5–0	San Jose Earthquakes	Orlando, Florida
4:30 PM PDT	Nani 7' (pen.); Michel 16', 90'; Dike 31', 49'	Report	Judson (yellow card) 25'; Alanís (yellow card) 52'	Stadium: Exploria Stadium; Attendance: 15,476; Referee: Chris Penso

June 26 11	San Jose Earthquakes	1–3	LA Galaxy	San Jose, California
7:00 PM PDT	Judson (yellow card) 6'; Remedi (yellow card) 66'; Cowell 82'; J. López (yellow card) 90'	Report	Hernández 11', 50'; Bond (yellow card) 59'; Jungwirth 70' (o.g.)	Stadium: PayPal Park; Attendance: 18,000; Referee: Armando Villarreal

July 3 12	Minnesota United FC	2–2	San Jose Earthquakes	Saint Paul, Minnesota
5:00 PM PDT	Kallman 45+4'; Ábila 69'; Dibassy (yellow card) 85'; Alonso (yellow card) 90+5'	Report	Cowell 15'; Remedi (yellow card) 32'; Espinoza (yellow card) 68'; Kikanovic 82'; Marie (yellow card) 90+5'	Stadium: Allianz Field; Attendance: 19,687; Referee: Michael Radchuk

July 17 13	Colorado Rapids	1–1	San Jose Earthquakes	Commerce City, Colorado
6:00 PM PDT	Shinyashiki (yellow card) 38'; Bassett 53'; Toure (yellow card) 88'; Trusty (yellow card) 90+2'; Price (yellow card) 90+5'	Report	J. López 11'; Espinoza (yellow card) 55'	Stadium: Dick's Sporting Goods Park; Attendance: 14,664; Referee: Rosendo Mendoza

July 21 14	Sporting Kansas City	1–1	San Jose Earthquakes	Kansas City, Kansas
5:30 PM PDT	Lindsey (yellow card) 57'; Zusi (yellow card) 86'; Sallói 90+4'	Report	J. López (yellow card) 40'; Tavares (yellow card) 49' (yellow-red card) 90+5'; Espinoza (yellow card) 81'; Cardoso 53' (yellow card) 86'	Stadium: Children's Mercy Park; Attendance: 17,872; Referee: Joseph Dickerson

July 24 15	San Jose Earthquakes	1–1	Houston Dynamo FC	San Jose, California
7:00 PM PDT	Valentin 45+5' (o.g.); Cardoso (yellow card) 70'; Fierro (red card) 90+7'	Report	Vera 40', (yellow card) 68'; Picault (yellow card) 53'; Parker (yellow card) 57'; Urruti (yellow card) 90+8'	Stadium: PayPal Park; Attendance: 12,793; Referee: Ted Unkel

July 31 16	Seattle Sounders FC	0–1	San Jose Earthquakes	Seattle, Washington
2:00 PM PDT	Medranda (yellow card) 31'; Paulo (yellow card) 53'; Atencio (yellow card) 90+3'	Report	Espinoza 45+1'; Abecasis (yellow card) 49'; Cowell (yellow card) 62'; Cardoso (yellow card) 90+4'	Stadium: Lumen Field; Attendance: 32,704; Referee: Joseph Dickerson

August 4 17	Portland Timbers	1–1	San Jose Earthquakes	Portland, Oregon
7:30 PM PDT	Van Rankin (yellow card) 29'; Mora 45+6'; Williamson (yellow card) 85'; Chará (yellow card) 90+2' (yellow-red card) 90+3'; Blanco (yellow card) 90+6'; Mabiala (yellow card) 90+9'	Report	J. López 24'; Salinas (yellow card) 90+6'; Cardoso (yellow card) 90+8'; M. López (yellow card) 90+9'	Stadium: Providence Park; Attendance: 22,233; Referee: Allen Chapman

August 8 18	San Jose Earthquakes	2–1	Los Angeles FC	San Jose, California
4:00 PM PDT	Nathan 11'; J. López 28'; Cowell (yellow card) 39'; Ebobisse (yellow card) 76'	Report	Murillo (yellow card) 10'; Yueill 39' (o.g.); Rossi (yellow card) 78'	Stadium: PayPal Park; Attendance: 18,000; Referee: Rubiel Vazquez

August 13 19	San Jose Earthquakes	0–0	Vancouver Whitecaps FC	San Jose, California
7:30 PM PDT	J. López (yellow card) 43'; M. López (yellow card) 72'; Cowell (yellow card) 90+6'	Report	Dájome (yellow card) 88'	Stadium: PayPal Park; Attendance: 11,967; Referee: Timothy Ford

August 17 20	San Jose Earthquakes	1–1	Minnesota United FC	San Jose, California
7:30 PM PDT	Dibassy 12' (o.g.); Nathan (red card) 21'; M. López (yellow card) 90+4'	Report	Trapp 22'; Taylor (yellow card) 82'; Dibassy (yellow card) 89'	Stadium: PayPal Park; Attendance: 10,353; Referee: Victor Rivas

August 20 21	LA Galaxy	1–2	San Jose Earthquakes	Carson, California
7:00 PM PDT	Cabral (yellow card) 23'; Vázquez 65' dos Santos (yellow card) 69'	Report	Abecasis (yellow card) 11'; Remedi (yellow card) 41'; Ebobisse 52'; Hämäläinen 71' (o.g.); Marchinkowski (yellow card) 86'	Stadium: Dignity Health Sports Park; Attendance: 17,568; Referee: Armando Villarreal

September 4 22	San Jose Earthquakes	0–1	Colorado Rapids	San Jose, California
8:00 PM MDT	Remedi (yellow card) 61'; Alanís (yellow card) 84'	Report	Abubakar (yellow card) 4'; Mezquida (yellow card) 81'; Price (yellow card) 85'; Badji 89'	Stadium: PayPal Park; Attendance: 14,142; Referee: Joseph Dickerson

September 11 23	FC Dallas	1–1	San Jose Earthquakes	Frisco, Texas
5:30 PM PDT	Hedges (yellow card) 4'; Servania (yellow card) 41'; Pepi 50'	Report	Alanís 6' (pen.); Cardoso (yellow card) 48'; Judson (yellow card) 59'	Stadium: Toyota Stadium; Attendance: 15,237; Referee: Guido Gonzales Jr.

September 15 24	San Jose Earthquakes	3–4	Real Salt Lake	San Jose, California
7:30 PM PDT	López 26', 50', 65' (yellow card) 69'; Judson (yellow card) 59'; Remedi (yellow card) 72'	Report	Besler (yellow card) 8'; Rubin 45+2', 81'; Rusnák 49', (yellow card) 62'; Ruíz (yellow card) 67'; Meram 71'; Kreilach (yellow card) 75'; Toia (yellow card) 90'	Stadium: PayPal Park; Attendance: 9,636; Referee: Nima Saghafi

September 18 25	Austin FC	3–4	San Jose Earthquakes	Austin, Texas
6:00 PM PDT	Pereira (yellow card) 4'; Driussi 6'; Gallagher 35'; Ring 45', (yellow card) 58' (yellow-red card) 65'; Stuver (yellow card) 60'; Cascante (yellow card) 69'	Report	M. López 17'; Espinoza 49', (yellow card) 60'; J. López 58' (pen.), 63'; Marie (yellow card) 72'; Remedi (yellow card) 90+3'; Ríos 90+6'	Stadium: Q2 Stadium; Attendance: 20,738; Referee: Baldomero Toledo

September 25 26	San Jose Earthquakes	2–0	Los Angeles FC	San Jose, California
7:00 PM PDT	Kikanovic 3'; Nathan (yellow card) 31'; Espinoza (yellow card) 34'; E. López 47'; Abecasis (yellow card) 64'; M. López (yellow card) 86'	Report	Crisostomo (yellow card) 39'; Cifuentes (yellow card) 75'	Stadium: PayPal Park; Attendance: 16,927; Referee: Jair Marrufo

September 29 27	San Jose Earthquakes	1–3	Seattle Sounders FC	San Jose, California
7:30 PM PDT	Tavares (yellow card) 27'; O'Neill 51' (o.g.)	Report	Ruidíaz 25' (yellow card) 38' (goal) 42' (pen.); Roldan 49'; Roldan (yellow card) 83'	Stadium: PayPal Park; Attendance: 11,361; Referee: Allen Chapman

October 2 28	Vancouver Whitecaps FC	3–0	San Jose Earthquakes	Vancouver, British Columbia
7:00 PM PDT	Owusu (yellow card) 19'; White 26' 59' 73'; Jungwirth (yellow card) 57'; Brown (yellow card) 90+4'	Report	Remedi (yellow card) 57'; Cardoso (yellow card) 79'; Salinas (yellow card) 90+2'	Stadium: BC Place; Referee: Pierre-Luc Lauziere

October 16 29	Los Angeles FC	3–1	San Jose Earthquakes	Los Angeles, California
12:30 PM PDT	Musovski 3'; Arango 28' (pen.), 88', (yellow card) 86'; Murillo (yellow card) 81'; Farfan (yellow card) 90+3'	Report	Marcinkowski (yellow card) 28'; López (yellow card) 40'; Fierro 61'; Judson (yellow card) 90+9'	Stadium: Banc of California Stadium; Attendance: 22,003; Referee: Alan Kelly

October 20 30	San Jose Earthquakes	4–0	Austin FC	San Jose, California
7:30 PM PDT	Cardoso (yellow card) 25'; López 47'; Kikanovic 53'; Wondolowski 59'; M. López (yellow card) 81'; Fierro 85'	Report	Romaña (yellow card) 39'; Ring (yellow card) 45+1'	Stadium: PayPal Park; Attendance: 12,035; Referee: Ismir Pekmic

October 23 31	San Jose Earthquakes	1–1	Vancouver Whitecaps FC	San Jose, California
7:00 PM PDT	Thompson (yellow card) 45+1'; Kikanovic 60'	Report	Gaspar 53'	Stadium: PayPal Park; Attendance: 15,025; Referee: Marcos de Oliveira

October 27 32	Portland Timbers	2–0	San Jose Earthquakes	Portland, Oregon
7:00 PM PDT	Paredes (yellow card) 20'; D. Chará (yellow card) 27', (goal) 34'; Asprilla 55', (yellow card) 57'	Report	J. López (yellow card) 19'; Remedi (yellow card) 50'	Stadium: Providence Park; Attendance: 16,086; Referee: Alex Chilowicz

October 30 33	Real Salt Lake	3–4	San Jose Earthquakes	Sandy, Utah
12:30 PM PDT	Rusnák 9', 90+2'; Glad (yellow card) 48'; Chang 85'	Report	Alanís (yellow card) 27'; Fierro 37'; Yueill (yellow card) 45', (goal) 79'; Wondolowski 45+3'; Judson (yellow card) 58'; Cowell 69'; Espinoza (yellow card) 75'	Stadium: Rio Tinto Stadium; Attendance: 15,553; Referee: Jon Freemon

November 7 34	San Jose Earthquakes	1–1	FC Dallas	San Jose, California
3:00 PM PST	Beason (yellow card) 28'; Wondolowski 34'; Vega (yellow card) 38'	Report	Obrian 42'; Cerrillo (yellow card) 52'; Pomykal (yellow card) 56'; Schön (yellow card) 74'	Stadium: PayPal Park; Attendance: 12,000; Referee: Victor Rivas
