= 2021 Major League Soccer season =

26th season of Major League Soccer

Major League Soccer
- Season: 2021
- Dates: April 16 – November 7 (regular season); November 20 – December 11 (playoffs)
- Teams: 27
- MLS Cup: New York City FC (1st title)
- Supporters' Shield: New England Revolution (1st shield)
- Champions League (United States): New England Revolution; Colorado Rapids; Seattle Sounders FC; New York City FC
- Champions League (Canada): CF Montréal
- Matches: 459
- Goals: 1,282 (2.79 per match)
- Top goalscorer: Valentín Castellanos; Ola Kamara (19 goals each)
- Biggest home win: 6 goals: DC 7–1 TOR (July 3); NYC 6–0 DC (October 23)
- Biggest away win: 5 goals: MIA 0–5 NE (July 21)
- Highest scoring: 9 goals: MTL 5–4 CIN (July 17); CIN 3–6 NSH (October 27)
- Longest winning run: 5 matches NE (May 16 – June 23)
- Longest unbeaten run: 13 matches SEA (April 16 – July 7)
- Longest winless run: 16 matches HOU (May 29 – September 3)
- Longest losing run: 12 matches CIN (September 15 – November 7)
- Highest attendance: 67,507; ATL 0–1 CLB (July 24)
- Total attendance: 2,762,942
- Average attendance: 15,350

Locations of teams for the 2021 Major League Soccer season
Western Conference Eastern Conference

The 2021 Major League Soccer season was the 26th season of Major League Soccer (MLS), the top professional soccer league in the United States and Canada. The 2021 season included the addition of Austin FC as an expansion club, which took the league to 27 teams.

Due to the ongoing COVID-19 pandemic, the season was originally scheduled to begin on April 3, as opposed to the normal late February or early March start. This was later pushed back to April 16, the latest ever start to an MLS season, due to negotiations with the MLS Players Association for a new collective bargaining agreement. The regular season concluded on November 7. The 2021 MLS Cup playoffs began on November 20, and concluded with MLS Cup 2021 on December 11.

At the beginning of the season, COVID-19 cross-border restrictions imposed by the Canadian government has also made the Canadian teams to play their home matches in the United States from the start of the season, while also sharing stadiums with other American MLS teams. On July 14, MLS announced that a select Toronto FC and CF Montréal matches would be played in Canada while working with the Canadian government on how the matches were to be held. Nearly a week later, the MLS announced that the Canadian teams would play home matches in Canada in August 2021.

The Columbus Crew were the defending champions, having defeated Seattle Sounders FC in MLS Cup 2020 but was eliminated from playoffs during the regular season, while the Philadelphia Union were the defending Supporters' Shield winners. The New England Revolution won their first Supporters' Shield, in the process breaking the record for most regular season points collected. New York City FC won their first ever MLS Cup, beating Portland Timbers in the decider.

== Teams ==
=== Stadiums and locations ===
Team	Stadium	Capacity
Atlanta United FC	Mercedes-Benz Stadium	71,000
Austin FC	Q2 Stadium	20,500
Chicago Fire FC	Soldier Field	24,955
FC Cincinnati	TQL Stadium	26,000
Colorado Rapids	Dick's Sporting Goods Park	18,061
Columbus Crew	Lower.com Field	20,011
FC Dallas	Toyota Stadium	20,500
D.C. United	Audi Field	20,000
Houston Dynamo FC	BBVA Stadium	22,039
LA Galaxy	Dignity Health Sports Park	27,000
Los Angeles FC	Banc of California Stadium	22,000
Minnesota United FC	Allianz Field	19,400
Inter Miami CF	DRV PNK Stadium	18,000
CF Montréal	Saputo Stadium	19,619
Nashville SC	Nissan Stadium	27,600
New England Revolution	Gillette Stadium	20,000
New York City FC	Yankee Stadium	30,321
New York Red Bulls	Red Bull Arena	25,000
Orlando City SC	Exploria Stadium	25,500
Philadelphia Union	Subaru Park	18,500
Portland Timbers	Providence Park	25,218
Real Salt Lake	Rio Tinto Stadium	20,213
San Jose Earthquakes	PayPal Park	18,000
Seattle Sounders FC	Lumen Field	37,722
Sporting Kansas City	Children's Mercy Park	18,467
Toronto FC	BMO Field	28,351
Vancouver Whitecaps FC	BC Place	22,120

1. Non-soccer specific stadium and artificially reduced capacity.
2. Some of the home matches were played at Red Bull Arena at Harrison due to scheduling conflicts at Yankee Stadium.
3. Temporary stadium.
4. CF Montréal played at DRV PNK Stadium, Fort Lauderdale since the start of the season due to COVID-19 travel restrictions in Canada before returning to playing home matches in Montreal on July 17. A small number of matches were also played in different stadiums due to scheduling conflicts with the 2021 CONCACAF Gold Cup qualification.
5. Toronto FC played at Exploria Stadium, Orlando from the start of the season due to COVID-19 travel restrictions in Canada before returning playing home matches in Toronto on July 17.
6. Vancouver Whitecaps FC played at Rio Tinto Stadium, Sandy for the start of the season due to COVID-19 travel restrictions in Canada before returning playing home matches in Vancouver on August 21.
7. Columbus Crew played at Historic Crew Stadium from the start of the season before moving into Lower.com Field on July 3.

=== Personnel and sponsorship ===
Note: All teams use Adidas as universal kit manufacturer.

Team	Head coach	Captain	Shirt sponsor	Sleeve sponsor
Atlanta United FC	(Mexico) Gonzalo Pineda	(United States) Brad Guzan	American Family Insurance	AT&T, Piedmont Orthopedics
Austin FC	(United States) Josh Wolff	(Finland) Alexander Ring	Yeti	Netspend
Chicago Fire FC	(United States) Frank Klopas (interim)	(Costa Rica) Francisco Calvo	Motorola	CIBC
FC Cincinnati	(Jamaica) Tyrone Marshall (interim)	(Argentina) Luciano Acosta	Mercy Health	Kroger
Colorado Rapids	(United States) Robin Fraser	(England) Jack Price	—	
Columbus Crew	(United States) Caleb Porter	(Ghana) Jonathan Mensah	Nationwide	Scotts
D.C. United	(Argentina) Hernán Losada	(United States) Steve Birnbaum	Leidos	EagleBank
FC Dallas	(United States) Marco Ferruzzi (interim)	(United States) Matt Hedges	MTX Group	AdvoCare
Houston Dynamo FC	(United States) Tabare Ramos	(United States) Timothy Parker	MD Anderson	Kroger, Coushatta Casino Resort
Inter Miami CF	(England) Phil Neville	(Brazil) Gregore	XBTO	Baptist Health
LA Galaxy	(United States) Greg Vanney	(Mexico) Jonathan dos Santos	Herbalife	Honey
Los Angeles FC	(United States) Bob Bradley	(Mexico) Carlos Vela	Flex	Target, Postmates
Minnesota United FC	(England) Adrian Heath	(Cuba) Osvaldo Alonso	Target	Bell Bank
CF Montréal	(France) Wilfried Nancy	(Canada) Samuel Piette	Bank of Montreal	Saputo, Jason
Nashville SC	(England) Gary Smith	(United States) Dax McCarty	Renasant Bank	Hyundai
New England Revolution	(United States) Bruce Arena	(Spain) Carles Gil	UnitedHealth	Santander
New York City FC	(Norway) Ronny Deila	(United States) Sean Johnson	Etihad Airways	Sol Cacao
New York Red Bulls	(Austria) Gerhard Struber	(United States) Sean Davis	Red Bull	Provident Bank
Orlando City SC	(Colombia) Óscar Pareja	(Portugal) Nani	Orlando Health	Exploria
Philadelphia Union	(United States) Jim Curtin	(United States) Alejandro Bedoya	Bimbo Bakeries USA	Subaru
Portland Timbers	(Venezuela) Giovanni Savarese	(Argentina) Diego Valeri	Alaska Airlines	TikTok
Real Salt Lake	(United States) Pablo Mastroeni (interim)	(Slovakia) Albert Rusnák	LifeVantage	KeyBank, Ford
San Jose Earthquakes	(Argentina) Matías Almeyda	(United States) Chris Wondolowski	Intermedia	PayPal
Seattle Sounders FC	(United States) Brian Schmetzer	(Uruguay) Nicolás Lodeiro	Zulily	Emerald Queen Casino
Sporting Kansas City	(United States) Peter Vermes	(Scotland) Johnny Russell	Victory Project	Compass Minerals, Children's Mercy
Toronto FC	(Spain) Javier Pérez	(United States) Michael Bradley	Bank of Montreal	GE Appliances, Canadian Tire
Vancouver Whitecaps FC	(Italy) Vanni Sartini (interim)	(Canada) Russell Teibert	Bell Canada	—

=== Coaching changes ===
Team	Outgoing coach	Manner of departure	Date of vacancy	Position in table	Incoming coach	Date of appointment
Toronto FC	(United States) Greg Vanney	Resigned	December 1, 2020	Pre-season	(United States) Chris Armas	January 13, 2021
D.C. United	(United States) Chad Ashton	End of interim period	December 12, 2020	Pre-season	(Argentina) Hernán Losada	January 18, 2021
LA Galaxy	(United States) Dominic Kinnear	End of interim period	December 12, 2020	Pre-season	(United States) Greg Vanney	January 5, 2021
Atlanta United FC	(Scotland) Stephen Glass	End of interim period	December 16, 2020	Pre-season	(Argentina) Gabriel Heinze	December 18, 2020
Inter Miami CF	(Uruguay) Diego Alonso	Mutual consent	January 7, 2021	Pre-season	(England) Phil Neville	January 18, 2021
CF Montréal	(France) Thierry Henry	Resigned	February 25, 2021	Pre-season	(France) Wilfried Nancy	March 8, 2021
Toronto FC	(United States) Chris Armas	Fired	July 4, 2021	14th in East, 27th overall	(Spain) Javier Pérez (Note: Pérez was initially appointed as interim manager, but the move was made permanent on August 9, 2021.)	July 4, 2021
Atlanta United FC	(Argentina) Gabriel Heinze	Fired	July 18, 2021	10th in East, 20th Overall	(United States) Rob Valentino (interim)	July 18, 2021
Atlanta United FC	(United States) Rob Valentino	End of interim period	August 12, 2021	10th in East, 20th Overall	(Mexico) Gonzalo Pineda	August 12, 2021
Real Salt Lake	(United States) Freddy Juarez	Mutual consent	August 27, 2021	6th in West, 13th overall	(United States) Pablo Mastroeni (interim)	August 27, 2021
Vancouver Whitecaps FC	(Canada) Marc Dos Santos	Mutual consent	August 27, 2021	10th in West, 19th overall	(Italy) Vanni Sartini (interim)	August 27, 2021
FC Dallas	(United States) Luchi Gonzalez	Fired	September 19, 2021	11th in West, 21st overall	(United States) Marco Ferruzzi (interim)	September 19, 2021
FC Cincinnati	(Netherlands) Jaap Stam	Fired	September 27, 2021	13th in East, 26th overall	(Jamaica) Tyrone Marshall (interim)	September 27, 2021
Chicago Fire FC	(Switzerland) Raphaël Wicky	Mutual consent	September 30, 2021	12th in East, 22nd overall	(United States) Frank Klopas (interim)	September 30, 2021
Houston Dynamo FC	(United States) Tab Ramos	Fired	November 4, 2021	13th in West, 25th overall	Vacant until next season	
Los Angeles FC	(United States) Bob Bradley	Mutual consent	November 18, 2021	Post-season	Vacant until next season	

== Regular season ==
=== Format ===
Each team played 34 matches, including 17 home games and 17 away games. Due to the difference in the number of teams in each conference, each conference had its own schedule construction format:

- All 14 Eastern Conference teams played six regional Eastern Conference opponents three times and the remaining seven Eastern Conference opponents twice. Each of them also played two cross conference games against different opponents.
- 11 out of the 13 Western Conference teams played eight regional Western Conference opponents three times and the remaining four Western Conference opponents twice. Each of them also played two cross conference games against different opponents.
- The remaining two teams from the Western Conference played seven Western Conference opponents three times and the remaining five Western Conference opponents twice. Each of them also played three cross conference games against different opponents.

=== Tiebreakers ===
The tie-breaker was used in this order:

1. Points
2. Total wins
3. Total goal differential
4. Total goals scored
5. Fewer disciplinary points
6. Away goal differential
7. Away goals scored
8. Home goals differential
9. Home goals scored
10. Coin toss (2 clubs tied) or drawing of lots (≥3 clubs tied)

Disciplinary points were decided as follows:

1. Foul (1 point)
2. Technical area warning (2 points)
3. Yellow card (3 points)
4. Second yellow card (7 points)
5. Straight red card (7 points)
6. Coach dismissal (7 points)
7. Any supplemental discipline (8 points)

=== Conference standings ===
==== Eastern Conference ====
Pos	Team	Pld	W	L	T	GF	GA	GD	Pts	Qualification
1	New England Revolution	34	22	5	7	65	41	+24	73	Qualification for the conference semifinals and the CONCACAF Champions League
2	Philadelphia Union	34	14	8	12	48	35	+13	54	Qualification for the first round
3	Nashville SC	34	12	4	18	55	33	+22	54	Qualification for the first round
4	New York City FC	34	14	11	9	56	36	+20	51	Qualification for the first round and the CONCACAF Champions League (Note: As MLS Cup 2021 champions)
5	Atlanta United FC	34	13	9	12	45	37	+8	51	Qualification for the first round
6	Orlando City SC	34	13	9	12	50	48	+2	51	Qualification for the first round
7	New York Red Bulls	34	13	12	9	39	33	+6	48	Qualification for the first round
8	D.C. United	34	14	15	5	56	54	+2	47	
9	Columbus Crew	34	13	13	8	46	45	+1	47	
10	CF Montréal (Note: Canadian clubs could not qualify for the 2022 CONCACAF Champions League through the MLS regular season or playoffs.)	34	12	12	10	46	44	+2	46	Qualification for the CONCACAF Champions League (Note: As 2021 Canadian Championship winners)
11	Inter Miami CF	34	12	17	5	36	53	−17	41	
12	Chicago Fire FC	34	9	18	7	36	54	−18	34	
13	Toronto FC	34	6	18	10	39	66	−27	28	
14	FC Cincinnati	34	4	22	8	37	74	−37	20	

Source: MLS
Rules for classification: 1) points; 2) total wins; 3) total goal differential; 4) total goals scored; 5) fewer disciplinary points; 6) away goal differential; 7) away goals scored; 8) home goals differential; 9) home goals scored; 10) coin toss (2 clubs tied) or drawing of lots (≥3 clubs tied)

==== Western Conference ====
Pos	Team	Pld	W	L	T	GF	GA	GD	Pts	
1	Colorado Rapids	34	17	7	10	51	35	+16	61	Qualification for the conference semifinals and the CONCACAF Champions League
2	Seattle Sounders FC	34	17	8	9	53	33	+20	60	Qualification for the first round and the CONCACAF Champions League
3	Sporting Kansas City	34	17	10	7	58	40	+18	58	Qualification for the first round
4	Portland Timbers	34	17	13	4	56	52	+4	55	Qualification for the first round
5	Minnesota United FC	34	13	11	10	42	44	−2	49	Qualification for the first round
6	Vancouver Whitecaps FC (Note: Canadian clubs could not qualify for the 2022 CONCACAF Champions League through the MLS regular season or playoffs.)	34	12	9	13	45	45	0	49	Qualification for the first round
7	Real Salt Lake	34	14	14	6	55	54	+1	48	Qualification for the first round
8	LA Galaxy	34	13	12	9	50	54	−4	48	
9	Los Angeles FC	34	12	13	9	53	51	+2	45	
10	San Jose Earthquakes	34	10	13	11	46	54	−8	41	
11	FC Dallas	34	7	15	12	47	56	−9	33	
12	Austin FC	34	9	21	4	35	56	−21	31	
13	Houston Dynamo FC	34	6	16	12	36	54	−18	30	

Source: MLS
Rules for classification: 1) points; 2) total wins; 3) total goal differential; 4) total goals scored; 5) fewer disciplinary points; 6) away goal differential; 7) away goals scored; 8) home goals differential; 9) home goals scored; 10) coin toss (2 clubs tied) or drawing of lots (≥3 clubs tied)

=== Overall table ===
The leading team in this table wins the Supporters' Shield.

Pos	Team	Pld	W	L	T	GF	GA	GD	Pts	
1	New England Revolution (S)	34	22	5	7	65	41	+24	73	Qualification for the CONCACAF Champions League (Note: As Supporters' Shield winners (USA2))
2	Colorado Rapids	34	17	7	10	51	35	+16	61	Qualification for the CONCACAF Champions League (Note: As 2021 MLS Western Conference regular season champions (USA3))
3	Seattle Sounders FC	34	17	8	9	53	33	+20	60	Qualification for the CONCACAF Champions League (Note: As highest-ranked U.S. based Division I club (based on 2021 MLS regular season record) not already qualified (USA4))
4	Sporting Kansas City	34	17	10	7	58	40	+18	58	
5	Portland Timbers	34	17	13	4	56	52	+4	55	
6	Philadelphia Union	34	14	8	12	48	35	+13	54	
7	Nashville SC	34	12	4	18	55	33	+22	54	
8	New York City FC (C)	34	14	11	9	56	36	+20	51	Qualification for the CONCACAF Champions League (Note: As MLS Cup 2021 champions (USA1))
9	Atlanta United FC	34	13	9	12	45	37	+8	51	
10	Orlando City SC	34	13	9	12	50	48	+2	51	
11	Minnesota United FC	34	13	11	10	42	44	−2	49	
12	Vancouver Whitecaps FC	34	12	9	13	45	45	0	49	
13	Real Salt Lake	34	14	14	6	55	54	+1	48	
14	New York Red Bulls	34	13	12	9	39	33	+6	48	
15	LA Galaxy	34	13	12	9	50	54	−4	48	
16	D.C. United	34	14	15	5	56	54	+2	47	
17	Columbus Crew	34	13	13	8	46	45	+1	47	
18	CF Montréal (V)	34	12	12	10	46	44	+2	46	Qualification for the CONCACAF Champions League (Note: As 2021 Canadian Championship winners (CAN1))
19	Los Angeles FC	34	12	13	9	53	51	+2	45	
20	Inter Miami CF	34	12	17	5	36	53	−17	41	
21	San Jose Earthquakes	34	10	13	11	46	54	−8	41	
22	Chicago Fire FC	34	9	18	7	36	54	−18	34	
23	FC Dallas	34	7	15	12	47	56	−9	33	
24	Austin FC	34	9	21	4	35	56	−21	31	
25	Houston Dynamo FC	34	6	16	12	36	54	−18	30	
26	Toronto FC	34	6	18	10	39	66	−27	28	
27	FC Cincinnati	34	4	22	8	37	74	−37	20	

Source: MLS
Rules for classification: 1) points; 2) total wins; 3) total goal differential; 4) total goals scored; 5) fewer disciplinary points; 6) away goal differential; 7) away goals scored; 8) home goals differential; 9) home goals scored; 10) coin toss (2 clubs tied) or drawing of lots (≥3 clubs tied)
(C) Champions; (S) Supporters' Shield winners; (V) Canadian Championship winners

=== Fixtures and results ===
All cross-conference matches are shown on the Eastern Conference table. In some cases, a team hosted another more than once; in this case, the first matchup is listed on top and the second is listed below.

==== Eastern Conference ====
Home \ Away	ATL	CHI	CIN	CLB	DCU	MIA	MTL	NSH	NE	NYC	RBNY	ORL	PHI	TOR	CCH	CCA
Atlanta United FC	—	3–1	4–0	0–1	3–2	1–0	1–0	2–2	0–1	1–1	0–0	3–0	2–2	1–0	LAFC	SEA
Atlanta United FC	—	—	—	—	—	2–1	—	0–2	—	—	—	—	—	1–1	1–0	1–1
Chicago Fire FC	3–0	—	0–1	1–0	2–2	1–0	0–1	0–0	2–2	0–0	2–1	3–1	0–2	1–2	RSL	SKC
Chicago Fire FC	—	—	—	—	—	—	—	—	2–3	2–0	—	—	3–3	—	1–0	0–2
FC Cincinnati	1–1	3–4	—	2–2	0–0	2–3	0–0	3–6	0–1	1–2	0–1	1–1	1–2	2–0	COL	HOU
FC Cincinnati	1–2	—	—	—	—	0–1	—	—	—	—	—	0–1	—	—	0–2	1–1
Columbus Crew	2–3	2–0	3–2	—	3–1	4–0	2–1	0–0	2–2	2–1	2–1	3–2	0–0	2–1	SEA	ATX
Columbus Crew	—	2–0	—	—	2–4	—	—	—	—	—	1–2	—	—	—	1–2	0–0
D.C. United	1–2	1–0	4–2	1–3	—	1–0	2–1	0–0	2–3	2–1	1–0	0–1	0–1	7–1	MIN	SJ
D.C. United	—	3–0	—	—	—	—	—	—	—	—	1–0	—	3–1	—	3–1	1–4
Inter Miami CF	1–1	3–2	5–1	1–0	0–3	—	0–2	2–1	0–5	1–3	0–4	1–2	1–1	3–1	LA	POR
Inter Miami CF	—	—	—	—	—	—	2–1	1–5	—	—	—	—	—	3–0	2–3	0–1
CF Montréal	2–2	2–0	1–2	0–0	0–0	1–0	—	0–1	1–4	2–1	2–1	0–2	2–2	4–2	HOU	VAN
CF Montréal	2–1	—	5–4	—	—	—	—	—	—	—	—	—	—	3–1	2–0	0–2
Nashville SC	2–2	5–1	2–2	1–1	5–2	0–0	2–2	—	2–0	3–1	1–1	1–1	1–0	3–2	ATX	RSL
Nashville SC	—	—	3–0	—	—	—	1–1	—	—	—	—	2–2	—	—	1–0	0–0
New England Revolution	2–1	2–2	4–1	1–0	1–0	0–1	2–1	0–0	—	2–1	3–1	2–1	2–1	2–3	COL	DAL
New England Revolution	—	—	—	1–1	3–2	—	—	—	—	—	3–2	—	—	—	1–0	1–2
New York City FC	1–0	1–0	5–0	1–2	2–1	2–0	1–0	0–0	2–3	—	0–1	5–0	1–1	1–1	DAL	LAFC
New York City FC	—	—	—	4–1	6–0	—	—	—	2–0	—	—	—	—	—	3–3	1–2
New York Red Bulls	0–0	2–0	0–0	1–0	1–1	1–0	1–0	2–0	2–3	1–1	—	2–1	1–1	2–0	SKC	LA
New York Red Bulls	—	0–1	—	—	—	—	—	—	—	1–0	—	—	1–1	—	1–2	2–3
Orlando City SC	0–0	1–0	3–0	3–2	2–1	1–1	2–4	1–1	2–2	1–1	1–2	—	2–1	1–0	SJ	SKC
Orlando City SC	3–2	—	—	—	—	0–0	1–1	—	—	—	—	—	—	—	5–0	1–1
Philadelphia Union	1–0	1–1	2–0	1–0	2–1	1–2	1–1	1–0	1–1	0–2	1–0	3–1	—	3–0	POR	MIN
Philadelphia Union	—	—	—	3–0	—	—	—	—	0–1	1–0	—	—	—	—	3–0	2–3
Toronto FC	0–2	3–1	0–2	2–0	1–3	0–1	1–1	1–1	1–2	2–2	1–1	2–3	2–2	—	VAN	COL
Toronto FC	—	—	3–2	—	—	—	—	2–1	—	—	—	1–1	—	—	2–2	0–0

Source: MLS
Legend: Blue = home team win; Yellow = draw; Red = away team win.

==== Western Conference ====
Home \ Away	ATX	COL	DAL	HOU	LA	LAFC	MIN	POR	RSL	SJ	SEA	SKC	VAN
Austin FC	—	0–1	3–5	3–2	2–0	0–2	0–1	4–1	2–1	0–0	0–1	3–1	1–2
Austin FC	—	—	—	2–1	—	1–2	—	3–1	—	3–4	—	—	—
Colorado Rapids	1–3	—	3–0	3–1	1–1	5–2	3–2	2–0	2–1	1–1	1–1	0–0	1–1
Colorado Rapids	3–0	—	2–0	—	—	—	2–0	—	—	—	1–1	—	—
FC Dallas	2–0	0–0	—	1–1	4–0	2–3	1–1	4–1	2–2	1–1	0–1	0–2	2–2
FC Dallas	2–1	—	—	—	—	—	0–0	—	1–2	—	—	1–3	—
Houston Dynamo FC	3–0	1–3	2–2	—	0–3	1–1	1–2	2–2	0–0	2–1	2–1	1–0	2–1
Houston Dynamo FC	—	0–1	3–2	—	—	—	—	0–2	—	—	—	—	0–0
LA Galaxy	2–0	1–2	3–1	1–1	—	2–1	3–3	4–1	1–0	1–0	1–2	0–2	1–1
LA Galaxy	—	—	2–2	—	—	1–1	—	2–1	—	1–2	—	—	—
Los Angeles FC	2–0	2–1	2–0	1–1	3–3	—	2–2	1–2	2–1	3–1	1–1	1–4	2–2
Los Angeles FC	—	—	—	—	—	—	—	—	3–2	—	3–0	4–0	1–1
Minnesota United FC	0–1	1–3	1–0	2–0	0–1	1–1	—	2–1	1–2	2–2	1–0	0–0	1–0
Minnesota United FC	2–0	—	—	2–0	3–0	—	—	—	—	—	—	2–1	—
Portland Timbers	3–0	2–2	1–0	2–1	3–0	2–1	0–1	—	3–2	1–1	1–2	2–1	2–3
Portland Timbers	—	—	—	—	—	2–1	—	—	6–1	2–0	2–6	—	—
Real Salt Lake	1–0	3–0	3–2	1–1	2–2	0–1	1–1	1–3	—	1–2	1–0	3–1	3–1
Real Salt Lake	—	3–1	—	2–1	2–1	—	—	—	—	3–4	—	—	—
San Jose Earthquakes	4–0	0–1	3–1	1–1	1–3	2–1	1–1	0–2	3–4	—	0–1	1–3	0–0
San Jose Earthquakes	—	—	1–1	—	—	2–0	—	—	—	—	1–3	—	1–1
Seattle Sounders FC	0–0	3–0	1–1	2–0	3–0	2–0	4–0	0–2	2–1	0–1	—	1–3	2–2
Seattle Sounders FC	—	—	—	—	1–1	—	1–0	—	—	—	—	1–2	4–1
Sporting Kansas City	2–1	3–1	1–2	3–2	2–0	2–1	4–0	1–1	0–1	1–1	1–2	—	3–0
Sporting Kansas City	1–1	1–1	—	4–2	—	—	—	—	—	—	—	—	—
Vancouver Whitecaps FC	2–1	0–1	1–0	0–0	1–2	2–1	2–2	1–0	0–4	3–0	1–1	2–1	—
Vancouver Whitecaps FC	—	—	—	—	2–1	—	2–1	0–1	4–1	—	—	—	—

Source: MLS
Legend: Blue = home team win; Yellow = draw; Red = away team win.

=== MLS All-Star Game ===
2021 MLS All-Star Game
August 25, 2021
6:30 p.m. PDT

MLS All-Stars (United States) (Canada)	1–1	(Mexico) Liga MX All-Stars
Murillo 53'	Report	Rodríguez 20'
Penalties
Kreilach (penalty scored); Sallói (penalty scored); Atuesta (penalty missed); Nani (penalty missed); Pepi (penalty scored)	3–2	(penalty scored) Sambueza; (penalty missed) Funes Mori; (penalty missed) Lira; (penalty missed) Reyes; (penalty scored) Romo

Banc of California Stadium, Los Angeles, California
Attendance: 21,000
Referee: Armando Villarreal (United States)

== MLS Cup playoffs ==
=== Bracket ===
First round November 20–23	Conference semifinals November 25–30
E1	New England Revolution	2 (3)
E4	New York City FC (p)	2 (5)
E4	New York City FC	2
E5	Atlanta United FC	0
Eastern Conference
E3	Nashville SC	3
E6	Orlando City SC	1
E3	Nashville SC	1 (0)
E2	Philadelphia Union (p)	1 (2)
E2	Philadelphia Union (a.e.t.)	1
E7	New York Red Bulls	0
W1	Colorado Rapids	0
W4	Portland Timbers	1
W4	Portland Timbers	3
W5	Minnesota United FC	1
Western Conference
W3	Sporting Kansas City	3
W6	Vancouver Whitecaps FC	1
W3	Sporting Kansas City	1
W7	Real Salt Lake	2
W2	Seattle Sounders FC	0 (5)
W7	Real Salt Lake (p)	0 (6)

Conference finals December 4–5
E4	New York City FC	2
E2	Philadelphia Union	1
W4	Portland Timbers	2
W7	Real Salt Lake	0

MLS Cup; December 11
E4	New York City FC (p)	1 (4)
W4	Portland Timbers	1 (2)

Note: The higher seeded teams hosted matches, with the MLS Cup host determined by overall points.

=== MLS Cup ===
December 11, 2021
12:00 p.m. PST

Portland Timbers	1–1 (a.e.t.)	New York City FC
Mora 90+4'	Report	Castellanos 41'
Penalties
Mora (penalty missed); Valeri (penalty missed); Moreno (penalty scored); Paredes (penalty scored)	2–4	(penalty scored) Castellanos; (penalty missed) Morales; (penalty scored) Moralez; (penalty scored) Talles Magno; (penalty scored) Callens

Providence Park, Portland, Oregon, U.S.
Attendance: 25,218
Referee: Armando Villarreal

== COVID-19 restrictions ==
From the start of the season, all Canadian teams played home matches behind closed doors at venues in a U.S. market (notwithstanding any local regulations otherwise allowing spectators) due to Canadian border restrictions.

On July 14, MLS announced that both CF Montreal and Toronto FC planned to return to playing matches at their home stadiums beginning July 17, citing new policies allowing vaccinated individuals to enter the country without 14 days self-isolation, provided that they test negative on a COVID-19 test. Unvaccinated individuals must still self-isolate, but a member of the MLS Players Association stated that nearly 95% of the league's player pool had been vaccinated, and Toronto FC manager Ali Curtis stated that all but two of their players were fully vaccinated. Toronto FC planned to admit 7,000 essential workers for the first match before expanding to 15,000 for subsequent matches, and CF Montreal planned to admit 5,000. However, Sportsnet reported that the plans had not yet been formally approved by the Public Health Agency of Canada, and that the Canadian government was expected to issue a statement on the matter.

Team	Spectators	Limitations	Source(s)
Austin FC	All	All Home matches starting with the first home match at Q2 Stadium scheduled for June 19, 2021 to be operated at full capacity	
Atlanta United FC	All	Capped at 50% (about 22,000 fans) capacity at start of season. Operating at full capacity since May 15, 2021.	
Chicago Fire FC	All	Capped at 25% (about 15,500 fans) capacity from start of season.	
FC Cincinnati	All	First home match at TQL Stadium was held on May 16, 2021. Capped up to 6,000 fans since the home opening match. Operating at full capacity since May 24, 2021.	
Colorado Rapids	All	Capped at 44% (about 7,900 fans) capacity from start of season.	
Columbus Crew	All	Capped at 30% (about 6,000 fans) capacity from start of season at Historic Crew Stadium. Operating at full capacity since June 20, 2021, including at Lower.com Field.	
D.C. United	All	Capped at 25% (about 5,000 fans) capacity from start of season. Operating at full capacity since June 20, 2021.	
FC Dallas	All	Capped at 50% (about 9,000 fans) capacity from start of season. Plans to have full capacity starting June 1, 2021.	
Houston Dynamo FC	All	Capped at 30% (about 6,200 fans) capacity from start of season.	
Inter Miami CF	All	Capped at 45% (about 8,000 fans) capacity for the first 3 matches of the season. Current plan is to host 16,000 fans starting May 29.	
LA Galaxy	All	Allowed at least 100 spectators per match. Operating at full capacity since June 19.	
Los Angeles FC	All	Currently allow at least 100 spectators per match. Operating at full capacity since June 19, 2021.	
Minnesota United FC	All	Capped at 25% (about 5,000 fans) capacity from start of season.	
CF Montréal	Some	Home matches played at DRV PNK Stadium in Fort Lauderdale and in other stadiums were played without any audience. All home matches played at Saputo Stadium since July 17 are currently capped at 5,000 fans.	
Nashville SC	All	Capped at 40% (about 27,600 fans) capacity from start of season.	
New England Revolution	All	Capped at 12% (about 7,900 fans) capacity from start of season.	
New York City FC	All	Capped at 20% (about 10,800 fans) capacity from start of season. Negative COVID-19 PCR test within past 72 hours, negative COVID-19 rapid antigen test within past 6 hours, or vaccination completed no fewer than 14 days prior to the game required to enter for home matches at Yankee Stadium; although this is no longer a requirement since June 15, 2021. Capacity for home matches at Red Bull Arena will also be capped at 15%.	
New York Red Bulls	All	Capped at 15% (about 3,750 fans) capacity from start of season.	
Orlando City SC	All	Capped at 50% (about 12,750 fans) capacity from start of season. Opened to 100% capacity beginning June 22.	
Philadelphia Union	All	Capped at 30% (about 5,000 fans) capacity from start of season.	
Portland Timbers	All	Capped at 25% (about 6,300 fans) capacity from start of season. Starting June 19, the Timbers will allow 80% capacity with spectators 16 and over required to be fully vaccinated.	
Real Salt Lake	All	Capped at 50% (about 10,000 fans) capacity from start of season.	
San Jose Earthquakes	All	Capped at 20% (about 3,600 fans) capacity from start of season.	
Seattle Sounders FC	All	Capped at 25% (about 15,000 fans) capacity from start of season.	
Sporting Kansas City	All	Capped at 35% (about 6,500 fans) capacity from start of season. Opened to 100% capacity beginning May 29.	
Toronto FC	Some	Home matches played at Exploria Stadium in Orlando before July were played with no audience. Home matches played at BMO Field were capped at 7,000 fans on July 17 followed by 15,000 fans since July 21.	
Vancouver Whitecaps FC	Some	Have returned to BC Place	

== Attendance ==
=== Average home attendances ===
As of November 7, 2021

Games without fans are not counted in averages or games played. Additionally, multiple games (above all the NYCFC games at Yankee Stadium) did not have their attendance listed and are also not counted in averages or games played.

Rank	Team	GP	Cumulative	High	Low	Mean
1	Atlanta United FC	17	747,386	67,507	20,335	43,964
2	Seattle Sounders FC	17	427,121	45,737	7,042	25,125
3	Portland Timbers	12	255,412	25,218	16,086	21,284
4	FC Cincinnati	17	359,969	25,701	6,000	21,175
5	Austin FC	15	310,832	20,738	20,500	20,722
6	Nashville SC	16	309,405	26,913	12,164	19,338
7	Sporting Kansas City	15	282,608	20,213	16,888	18,841
8	Los Angeles FC	17	318,800	22,510	4,900	18,753
9	New England Revolution	12	215,381	31,635	7,905	17,948
10	Columbus Crew	17	281,918	20,407	5,180	16,583
11	LA Galaxy	17	266,493	25,174	6,853	15,676
12	Orlando City SC	16	250,299	19,009	11,503	15,644
13	Real Salt Lake	17	261,677	20,738	9,842	15,393
14	Minnesota United FC	13	192,193	19,691	4,100	14,784
15	Inter Miami CF	17	235,403	17,926	7,939	13,847
16	FC Dallas	17	228,110	19,096	8,621	13,418
17	New York Red Bulls	13	170,563	18,613	9,193	13,120
18	Philadelphia Union	15	193,552	18,575	5,000	12,903
19	D.C. United	17	217,441	18,034	3,935	12,791
20	San Jose Earthquakes	13	160,239	18,000	5,000	12,326
21	Houston Dynamo FC	17	207,732	20,021	6,376	12,220
22	Vancouver Whitecaps FC	7	84,560	25,117	7,503	12,080
23	CF Montréal	1	11,000	11,000	11,000	11,000
24	Colorado Rapids	12	144,169	17,104	8,321	10,792
25	Chicago Fire FC	17	181,949	31,308	5,593	10,703
26	Toronto FC	9	71,080	11,166	5,026	7,898
27	New York City FC	7	41,556	13,503	2,873	5,937
Total		180	2,762,942	67,507	0	15,350

=== Highest attendances ===
Regular season

Rank	Home team	Score	Away team	Attendance	Date	Week	Stadium
1	Atlanta United FC	0–1	Columbus Crew	67,507	July 24, 2021	13	Mercedes-Benz Stadium
2	Atlanta United FC	1–0	New York Red Bulls	67,503	August 15, 2021	19	Mercedes-Benz Stadium
3	Seattle Sounders FC	1–3	Portland Timbers	45,737	August 29, 2021	22	Lumen Field
4	Atlanta United FC	0–0	New York Red Bulls	42,575	June 27, 2021	9	Mercedes-Benz Stadium
5	Atlanta United FC	2–2	Philadelphia Union	42,523	June 20, 2021	8	Mercedes-Benz Stadium
6	Atlanta United FC	0–1	New England Revolution	42,517	July 17, 2021	12	Mercedes-Benz Stadium
7	Atlanta United FC	2–2	Nashville SC	40,748	May 29, 2021	7	Mercedes-Benz Stadium
8	Atlanta United FC	1–0	CF Montréal	40,116	May 15, 2021	5	Mercedes-Benz Stadium
9	Seattle Sounders FC	1–3	Sporting Kansas City	32,790	July 25, 2021	13	Lumen Field
10	Seattle Sounders FC	0–1	San Jose Earthquakes	32,704	July 31, 2021	14	Lumen Field

== Player movement ==
The 2020 MLS Expansion Draft was held on December 15, 2020, at 10:00 am (EST).

== Player statistics ==
=== Goals ===
Rank	Player	Club	Goals
1	(Argentina) Valentín Castellanos	New York City FC	19
1	(Norway) Ola Kamara	D.C. United	19
3	(Mexico) Javier Hernández	LA Galaxy	17
3	(Peru) Raúl Ruidíaz	Seattle Sounders FC	17
5	(Poland) Adam Buksa	New England Revolution	16
5	(Croatia) Damir Kreilach	Real Salt Lake	16
5	(Germany) Hany Mukhtar	Nashville SC	16
5	(Hungary) Dániel Sallói	Sporting Kansas City	16
9	(Argentina) Gustavo Bou	New England Revolution	15
9	(Scotland) Johnny Russell	Sporting Kansas City	15

=== Hat-tricks ===
Player	For	Against	Score	Date
(Mexico) Javier Hernández	LA Galaxy	New York Red Bulls	3−2	April 25
(Germany) Hany Mukhtar	Nashville SC	Chicago Fire FC	5–1	July 17
(United States) Ricardo Pepi	FC Dallas	LA Galaxy	4–0	July 24
(Norway) Ola Kamara	D.C. United	Chicago Fire FC	3–0	September 15
(Mexico) Javier Eduardo López	San Jose Earthquakes	Real Salt Lake	3–4	September 15
(United States) Brian White	Vancouver Whitecaps FC	San Jose Earthquakes	3–0	October 2
(Colombia) Cristian Arango	Los Angeles FC	FC Dallas	3−2	October 20

=== Assists ===
Rank	Player	Club	Assists
1	(Spain) Carles Gil	New England Revolution	18
2	(United States) Djordje Mihailovic	CF Montréal	16
3	(Germany) Julian Gressel	D.C. United	13
4	(Germany) Hany Mukhtar	Nashville SC	12
4	(England) Jack Price	Colorado Rapids	12
6	(Guatemala) Aaron Herrera	Real Salt Lake	11
6	(Brazil) João Paulo	Seattle Sounders FC	11
6	(Argentina) Maximiliano Moralez	New York City FC	11
6	(Slovakia) Albert Rusnák	Real Salt Lake	11
10	(Argentina) Luciano Acosta	FC Cincinnati	10
10	(Uruguay) Mauricio Pereyra	Orlando City SC	10
10	(Argentina) Emanuel Reynoso	Minnesota United FC	10
10	(Venezuela) Yeferson Soteldo	Toronto FC	10

=== Clean sheets ===
Rank	Player	Club	Clean sheets
1	(Brazil) Carlos Coronel	New York Red Bulls	13
1	(United States) Joe Willis	Nashville SC	13
1	(United States) William Yarbrough	Colorado Rapids	13
4	(Jamaica) Andre Blake	Philadelphia Union	12
5	(United States) Brad Guzan	Atlanta United FC	11
5	(United States) Tyler Miller	Minnesota United FC	11
7	(United States) Sean Johnson	New York City FC	9
8	(United States) Bill Hamid	D.C. United	8
9	(United States) Steve Clark	Portland Timbers	7
9	(Peru) Pedro Gallese	Orlando City SC	7
9	(Curaçao) Eloy Room	Columbus Crew	7

== Awards ==
=== Individual awards ===
Award	Player	Club
Most Valuable Player	(Spain) Carles Gil	New England Revolution
Defender of the Year	(United States) Walker Zimmerman	Nashville SC
Goalkeeper of the Year	(United States) Matt Turner	New England Revolution
Coach of the Year	(United States) Bruce Arena	New England Revolution
Young Player of the Year	(United States) Ricardo Pepi	FC Dallas
Newcomer of the Year	(Colombia) Cristian Arango	Los Angeles FC
Comeback Player of the Year	(Spain) Carles Gil	New England Revolution
Golden Boot	(Argentina) Valentín Castellanos	New York City FC
Fair Play Award	(United States) Dave Romney	Nashville SC
Humanitarian of the Year	(United States) Justin Morrow	Toronto FC
Goal of the Year	(United States) Rubio Rubin	Real Salt Lake
Save of the Year	(Switzerland) Stefan Frei	Seattle Sounders FC

=== Best XI ===
Goalkeeper	Defenders	Midfielders	Forwards	Ref
(United States) Matt Turner (NE)	(United States) Walker Zimmerman (NSH) (Colombia) Yeimar Gómez Andrade (SEA) (United States) Miles Robinson (ATL)	(Canada) Tajon Buchanan (NE) (Spain) Carles Gil (NE) (Germany) Hany Mukhtar (NSH) (Brazil) João Paulo (SEA)	(Argentina) Gustavo Bou (NE) (Argentina) Valentín Castellanos (NYC) (Peru) Raúl Ruidíaz (SEA)	

=== Player of the Month ===
Month	Player	Club	Stats	Ref.
April/May	(Mexico) Javier Hernández	LA Galaxy	7G, 1A	
June	(Spain) Carles Gil	New England Revolution	5A	
July	(Argentina) Gustavo Bou	New England Revolution	5G, 1A	
August	(Argentina) Valentín Castellanos	New York City FC	5G, 2A	
September	(Mexico) Javier Eduardo López	San Jose Earthquakes	6G, 1A	
October/November	(Argentina) Valentín Castellanos	New York City FC	6G, 1A	

=== Team of the Week ===
- **Bold** denotes League Player of the Week.

Team of the Week
Week	Goalkeeper	Defenders	Midfielders	Forwards	Bench	Coach
1	(Poland) Tytoń (CIN)	(Canada) Brault-Guillard (MTL) (United States) Robinson (ATL) (Honduras) García (HOU) (Canada) Gutiérrez (VAN)	(Costa Rica) Leal (NSH) (United States) Canouse (DCU) (United States) Rodríguez (HOU)	(Slovenia) Berić (CHI) (Mexico) **Hernández** (LA) (Peru) Ruidíaz (SEA)	(United States) Maurer (DAL) (United States) Hines-Ike (DCU) (United States) Mihailovic (MTL) (United States) Atencio (SEA) (Argentina) Acosta (CIN) (United States) Baird (LAFC) (Hungary) Sallói (SKC)	(France) Wilfried Nancy (MTL)
2	(United States) Johnson (NYC)	(Canada) Braut-Guillard (MTL) (Argentina) Figal (MIA) (Australia) Smith (SEA)	(Paraguay) Medina (NYC) (Argentina) Barco (ATL) (Argentina) F. Higuaín (MIA) (Ecuador) Julio (RSL)	(United States) Cowell (SJ) (Mexico) **Hernández** (LA) (Paraguay) Domínguez (ATX)	(United States) Ochoa (RSL) (Iceland) Þórarinsson (NYC) (Colombia) Atuesta (LAFC) (United States) Polster (NE) (Colombia) Asprilla (POR) (United States) Busio (SKC) (Portugal) Nani (ORL)	(United States) Josh Wolff (ATX)
3	(United States) Willis (NSH)	(Australia) Smith (SEA) (England) Shawcross (MIA) (United States) Sands (NYC) (Sweden) Tinnerholm (NYC)	(United States) Yueill (SJ) (Finland) Ring (ATX) (Spain) Gil (NE)	(United States) Rubin (RSL) (Peru) Ruidíaz (SEA) (United States) **Cowell** (SJ)	(United States) Yarbrough (COL) (United States) Hollingshead (DAL) (United States) Farrell (NE) (Colombia) Ricuarte (DAL) (United States) Clark (RBNY) (Portugal) Nani (ORL) (Chile) Rubio (COL)	(United States) Freddy Juarez (RSL)
4	(Canada) Crépeau (VAN)	(Norway) Glesnes (PHI) (United States) Zimmerman (NSH) (Scotland) Wilson (COL)	(United States) Muyl (NSH) (Argentina) Zelarayán (CLB) (United States) Bassett (COL) (Colombia) Dájome (VAN)	(Scotland) Russell (SKC) (Mexico) Hernández (LA) (United States) **Wondolowski** (SJ)	(United States) Stuver (ATX) (Luxembourg) Chanot (NYC) (United States) Clark (RBNY) (Mexico) dos Santos (LA) (Scotland) Morgan (MIA) (Portugal) Nani (ORL) (Peru) Ruidíaz (SEA)	(United States) Greg Vanney (LA)
5	(United States) Ketterer (POR)	(United States) A. Roldan (SEA) (Brazil) Carlos (ORL) (Ecuador) Arreaga (SEA) (United States) Araujo (LA)	(Finland) Lod (MIN) (United States) C. Roldan (SEA) (United States) Williamson (POR) (Colombia) Barrios (COL)	(Mexico) Pulido (SKC) (Argentina) **G. Higuaín** (MIA)	(United States) Miller (MIN) (Canada) Shaffelburg (TOR) (Paraguay) Medina (NYC) (Cape Verde) Monteiro (PHI) (Spain) Gil (NE) (Argentina) Moreno (ATL) (Norway) Johnsen (MTL)	(United States) Brian Schmetzer (SEA)
6	(Jamaica) Blake (PHI)	(Mexico) Van Rankin (POR) (Brazil) Carlos (ORL) (United States) Cameron (CIN) (United States) Hollingshead (DAL)	(Uruguay) Rossi (LAFC) (United States) Rodríguez (HOU) (Argentina) **Zelarayán** (CLB)	(Chile) Mora (POR) (Argentina) Bou (NE) (Mexico) Pulido (SKC)	(Peru) Gallese (ORL) (Cameroon) Nouhou (SEA) (Norway) Glesnes (PHI) (United States) Pineda (CHI) (Costa Rica) Leal (NSH) (Iceland) Traustason (NE) (Venezuela) Martínez (ATL)	(Netherlands) Jaap Stam (CIN)
7	(England) **Bond** (LA)	(United States) Rosenberry (COL) (England) Elliott (PHI) (Portugal) Santos (CLB)	(Spain) Gil (NE) (United States) Busio (SKC) (Venezuela) Cásseres Jr. (RBNY) (Germany) Mukhtar (NSH)	(Paraguay) Medina (NYC) (Poland) Przybyłko (PHI) (United States) Arriola (DC)	(Senegal) Diop (MTL) (United States) Besler (ATX) (United States) Herrera (RSL) (United States) Bassett (COL) (Libya) Tajouri Shradi (NYC) (United States) Toye (MTL) (Norway) Kamara (DC)	(Norway) Ronny Deila (NYC)
8	(United States) **Turner** (NE)	(Honduras) Najar (DC) (Colombia) Yeimar (SEA) (Norway) Glesnes (PHI) (United States) Duncan (RBNY)	(Argentina) Fragapane (MIN) (Colombia) D. Chará (POR) (Croatia) Kreilach (RSL) (Spain) Gil (NE)	(Canada) Akindele (ORL) (United States) Zardes (CLB)	(United States) Stuver (ATX) (United States) Hollingshead (DAL) (Portugal) Santos (CLB) (United States) Lennon (ATL) (Spain) Pozuelo (TOR) (Argentina) Moralez (NYC) (Argentina) Urruti (HOU)	(United States) Bruce Arena (NE)
9	(Senegal) Diop (MTL)	(Madagascar) Métanire (MIN) (England) Elliott (PHI) (United States) Jones (NE)	(Hungary) Sallói (SKC) (United States) C. Roldan (SEA) (Spain) **Gil** (NE) (United States) Haakenson (NSH) (Argentina) Fragapane (MIN)	(Mexico) Vela (LAFC) (Portugal) Nani (ORL)	(United States) Shuttleworth (CHI) (United States) Maher (NSH) (Argentina) Acosta (CIN) (Mexico) Álvarez (LA) (Libya) Tajouri Shradi (NYC) (United States) Ebobisse (POR) (United States) Dike (ORL)	(United States) Peter Vermes (SKC)
10	(Croatia) Marić (HOU)	(United States) Araujo (LA) (Slovenia) Struna (MTL) (Iceland) Þórarinsson (NYC)	(Portugal) Nani (ORL) (Argentina) Acosta (CIN) (United States) Busio (SKC) (Spain) Medrán (CHI) (Hungary) Sallói (SKC)	(Mexico) **Hernández** (LA) (United States) Pepi (DAL)	(United States) Stuver (ATX) (Spain) Fontàs (SKC) (Brazil) Paulo (SEA) (Slovakia) Rusnák (RSL) (Colombia) Dájome (VAN) (Brazil) Andrade (NYC) (France) Hunou (MIN)	(United States) Luchi Gonzalez (DAL)
11	(United States) Melia (SKC)	(Honduras) Najar (DC) (Colombia) Segura (LAFC) (United States) Paredes (DC)	(Canada) Buchanan (NE) (Spain) Medrán (CHI) (Finland) Ring (ATX) (Costa Rica) Leal (NSH) (Argentina) **Aliseda** (CHI)	(Paraguay) Domínguez (ATX) (Poland) Klimala (RBNY)	(Brazil) Coronel (RBNY) (United States) Cameron (CIN) (El Salvador) A. Roldan (SEA) (United States) Davis (RBNY) (Canada) Choinière (MTL) (United States) Zardes (CLB) (United States) Pepi (DAL)	(Austria) Gerhard Struber (RBNY)
12	(El Salvador) Romero (LAFC)	(Cameroon) Mbaizo (PHI) (Madagascar) Raveloson (LA) (United States) Tolkin (RBNY)	(Croatia) **Kreilach** (RSL) (United States) K. Acosta (COL) (Brazil) Paulo (SEA) (Spain) Medrán (CHI) (United States) Mihailovic (MTL)	(Venezuela) Soteldo (TOR) (Argentina) Zelarayán (CLB)	(United States) Shuttleworth (CHI) (Colombia) Segura (LAFC) (Germany) Mukhtar (NSH) (United States) Rowe (SEA) (United States) Lletget (LA) (Argentina) L. Acosta (CIN) (United States) Conway (ATL)	(Spain) Javier Pérez (TOR)
13	(United States) Ochoa (RSL)	(South Korea) Moon-hwan (LAFC) (England) Elliott (PHI) (United States) Morrow (TOR)	(United States) Bassett (COL) (United States) Nagbe (CLB) (Germany) **Mukhtar** (NSH) (Egypt) Hamdi (MTL)	(Brazil) Brenner (CIN) (United States) Toye (MTL) (Mexico) Vela (LAFC)	(Curaçao) Room (CLB) (United States) Lovitz (NSH) (Spain) Gil (NE) (Finland) Lod (MIN) (United States) Ebobisse (POR) (Colombia) Dájome (VAN) (Brazil) Santos (PHI)	(England) Adrian Heath (MIN)
14	(Netherlands) Vermeer (CIN)	(United States) Atencio (SEA) (Ghana) Abubakar (COL) (Venezuela) Hernández (ATL)	(Libya) Tajouri-Shradi (NYC) (Colombia) D. Chará (POR) (United States) Perea (ORL) (Iceland) Traustason (NE)	(Chile) Mora (POR) (Poland) Buksa (NE) (Peru) **Ruidíaz** (SEA)	(United States) Willis (NSH) (Brazil) Nathan (SJ) (United States) Paredes (DC) (Canada) Priso (TOR) (Madagascar) Raveloson (LA) (Spain) Gil (NE) (Hungary) Sallói (SKC)	(United States) Brian Schmetzer (SEA)
15	(United States) Bono (TOR)	(Denmark) Amundsen (NYC) (Ghana) Mensah (CLB) (United States) Che (DAL)	(Argentina) Moralez (NYC) (France) Walter (SKC) (Argentina) Reynoso (MIN) (Germany) Gressel (DC)	(Argentina) Bou (NE) (United States) Sapong (NSH) (United States) **Pepi** (DAL)	(Curaçao) Room (CLB) (United States) Glad (RSL) (United States) Gasper (MIN) (Ecuador) Cifuentes (LAFC) (Venezuela) Soteldo (TOR) (Poland) Przybyłko (PHI) (Argentina) Castellanos (NYC)	(United States) Kerry Zavagnin (SKC) (Note: Appointed as temporary head coach after Peter Vermes tested positive for COVID-19.)
16	(United States) Marcinkowski (SJ)	(Germany) Wagner (PHI) (United States) R. Castellanos (NSH) (United States) Araujo (LA)	(Portugal) **Nani** (ORL) (Spain) Gil (NE) (Argentina) Reynoso (MIN) (United States) Pomykal (DAL)	(Colombia) Dájome (VAN) (Argentina) G. Higuaín (MIA) (Brazil) Andrade (NYC)	(United States) Hamid (DC) (United States) Tafari (DAL) (Madagascar) Raveloson (LA) (United States) Parks (NYC) (Netherlands) van der Water (ORL) (Colombia) Barrios (COL) (Poland) Buksa (NE)	(United States) Luchi Gonzalez (DAL)
17	(United States) Slonina (CHI)	(England) Gibbs (MIA) (United States) Farrell (NE) (United States) Zusi (SKC)	(Mexico) Álvarez (LA) (Argentina) **Pochettino** (ATX) (Hungary) Gazdag (PHI) (Argentina) Moreno (ATL)	(Hungary) Sallói (SKC) (Brazil) Santos (PHI) (Peru) Reyna (DC)	(United States) Maurer (DAL) (Norway) Glesnes (PHI) (Brazil) Paulo (SEA) (Portugal) Nani (ORL) (Argentina) Jara (DAL) (Chile) Mora (POR) (Norway) Kamara (DC)	(Argentina) Hernán Losada (DC)
18	(Slovenia) Ivačič (POR)	(United States) Jones (NE) (Brazil) Nathan (SJ) (Honduras) Najar (DC)	(Argentina) Barco (ATL) (Spain) Pozuelo (TOR) (France) Matuidi (MIA) (Serbia) **Stojanović** (CHI)	(Hungary) Schön (DAL) (Colombia) Asprilla (POR) (Argentina) Espinoza (SJ)	(United States) Turner (NE) (United States) Kallman (MIN) (United States) Hollingshead (DAL) (Argentina) Reynoso (MIN) (Canada) Kaye (COL) (Argentina) Castellanos (NYC) (Portugal) Nani (ORL)	(United States) Rob Valentino (ATL)
19	(United States) Klinsmann (LA)	(Costa Rica) Calvo (CHI) (Spain) Fontàs (SKC) (United States) Sands (NYC)	(United States) Bassett (COL) (Argentina) Barco (ATL) (Kenya) Wanyama (MTL) (Canada) Buchanan (NE)	(Argentina) Castellanos (NYC) (United States) Sapong (NSH) (Peru) **Ruidíaz** (SEA)	(United States) Yarbrough (COL) (Senegal) Fall (LAFC) (Serbia) Stojanović (CHI) (Slovakia) Rusnák (RSL) (United States) Muyl (NSH) (Colombia) Montero (SEA) (Mexico) Pulido (SKC)	(United States) Brian Schmetzer (SEA)
20	(Brazil) Coronel (RBNY)	(Germany) Wagner (PHI) (United States) Zimmerman (NSH) (Argentina) Galván (COL)	(Hungary) Sallói (SKC) (Scotland) Gauld (VAN) (United States) McNamara (NE) (Argentina) Barco (ATL) (Ecuador) Julio (RSL)	(Argentina) G. Higuaín (MIA) (Peru) **Ruidíaz** (SEA)	(Canada) Breza (MTL) (United States) Robinson (ATL) (United States) Tolkin (RBNY) (United States) Trapp (MIN) (Serbia) Stojanović (CHI) (Ghana) Boateng (NE) (Chile) Mora (POR)	(United States) Robin Fraser (COL)
21	(United States) Melia (SKC)	(Argentina) González Pírez (MIA) (Ecuador) Arreaga (SEA) (Brazil) Carlos (ORL)	(Argentina) Moreno (ATL) (Mexico) **Pizarro** (MIA) (Scotland) Gauld (VAN) (Canada) Kaye (COL) (Uruguay) Fagúndez (ATX)	(Poland) Buksa (NE) (United States) Ebobisse (SJ)	(Canada) Crépeau (VAN) (United States) Tafari (DAL) (Argentina) Abecasis (SJ) (Brazil) Paulo (SEA) (United States) Sullivan (PHI) (Canada) Buchanan (NE) (Argentina) Driussi (ATX)	(Argentina) Matías Almeyda (SJ)
22	(United States) Clark (POR)	(United States) Lovitz (NSH) (Spain) Sánchez (SKC) (Colombia) Terán (CHI)	(Uruguay) Rodríguez (LAFC) (United States) Ferreira (DAL) (Argentina) Zelarayán (CLB) (Scotland) Gauld (VAN)	(France) Hunou (MIN) (Argentina) Castellanos (NYC) (United States) **Pepi** (DAL)	(Netherlands) Marsman (MIA) (United States) Mihailovic (MTL) (Argentina) Moralez (NYC) (Peru) Reyna (DC) (Serbia) Joveljić (LA) (Spain) Berry (CLB) (Chile) Mora (POR)	(Venezuela) Giovanni Savarese (POR)
23	(United States) Knighton (NE)	(Senegal) Fall (LAFC) (Argentina) Godoy (VAN) (Argentina) Figal (MIA)	(Argentina) Menéndez (RSL) (Colombia) Atuesta (LAFC) (Germany) **Mukhtar** (NSH) (United States) Polster (NE) (Colombia) Barrios (COL)	(United States) Dike (ORL) (Chile) Mora (POR)	(United States) Clark (POR) (United States) Lovitz (NSH) (Brazil) Urso (ORL) (Scotland) Gauld (VAN) (Slovakia) Rusnák (RSL) (United States) Ferreira (DAL) (Senegal) Badji (COL)	(United States) Bob Bradley (LAFC)
24	(Netherlands) Marsman (MIA)	(United States) Zimmerman (NSH) (United States) Steres (LA) (United States) Che (DAL)	(Argentina) Acosta (CIN) (Brazil) Paulo (SEA) (Spain) Gil (NE) (Argentina) Blanco (POR)	(United States) Picault (HOU) (Colombia) **Arango** (LAFC) (Argentina) Barco (ATL)	(Switzerland) Frei (SEA) (United States) Campbell (ATL) (Brazil) Gregore (MIA) (Italy) Mauri (SKC) (Canada) Buchanan (NE) (Colombia) Barrios (COL) (United States) Pepi (DAL)	(Mexico) Gonzalo Pineda (ATL)
25	(United States) Nelson (HOU)	(Venezuela) Makoun (MIA) (Argentina) Franco (ATL) (Ghana) Mensah (CLB)	(Scotland) Russell (SKC) (Mexico) López (SJ) (Slovakia) Rusnák (RSL) (Colombia) Obrian (DAL)	(Norway) **Kamara** (DC) (Venezuela) Martínez (ATL) (Honduras) Quioto (MTL)	(United States) Hamid (DC) (Ecuador) Cifuentes (LAFC) (Argentina) Blanco (POR) (United States) Mihailovic (MTL) (Paraguay) Medina (NYC) (Argentina) Barco (ATL) (United States) Rubin (RSL)	(United States) Peter Vermes (SKC)
26	(Curaçao) Room (CLB)	(United States) Bello (ATL) (Democratic Republic of the Congo) Mabiala (POR) (Brazil) Auro (TOR)	(United States) Fernandez (RBNY) (Argentina) Reynoso (MIN) (Mexico) **López** (SJ) (Argentina) Barco (ATL)	(Poland) Przybyłko (PHI) (Brazil) Fábio (RBNY) (Croatia) Kreilach (RSL)	(Canada) Pantemis (MTL) (United States) Herrera (RSL) (United States) Parks (NYC) (England) Price (COL) (United States) Mihailovic (MTL) (Colombia) Obrian (DAL) (United States) Dorsey (HOU)	(United States) Jim Curtin (PHI)
27	(Canada) Crépeau (VAN)	(Argentina) Bravo (POR) (Norway) Glesnes (PHI) (United States) Duncan (RBNY)	(Colombia) Y. Chará (POR) (Germany) Mukhtar (NSH) (Brazil) Paulo (SEA) (Mexico) López (SJ) (Germany) Gressel (DC)	(United States) **Zardes** (CLB) (Poland) Buksa (NE)	(Brazil) Coronel (RBNY) (United States) Birnbaum (DC) (Venezuela) Martínez (PHI) (Colombia) D. Chará (POR) (Argentina) Fragapane (MIN) (United States) Arriola (DC) (Senegal) Djitté (ATX)	(United States) Bruce Arena (NE)
28	(United States) Ochoa (RSL)	(United States) Trusty (COL) (United States) Robinson (ATL) (Honduras) Najar (DC)	(Canada) Shaffelburg (TOR) (United States) Roldan (SEA) (Argentina) F. Navarro (CHI) (Colombia) Asprilla (POR)	(Argentina) Bou (NE) (Peru) Ruidíaz (SEA) (Hungary) **Sallói** (SKC)	(Canada) Crépeau (VAN) (Colombia) Yeimar (SEA) (Zimbabwe) Hadebe (HOU) (Venezuela) José Martínez (PHI) (England) Price (COL) (Croatia) Kreilach (RSL) (Venezuela) Josef Martínez (ATL)	(Argentina) Hernán Losada (DC)
29	(Jamaica) Blake (PHI)	(United States) Gutman (RBNY) (Senegal) Fall (LAFC) (United States) Zimmerman (NSH)	(Paraguay) Domínguez (ATX) (United States) C. Roldan (SEA) (Brazil) Paulo (SEA) (Scotland) Russell (SKC)	(Honduras) Quioto (MTL) (United States) **White** (VAN) (Venezuela) Soteldo (TOR)	(Brazil) Phelipe (DAL) (Peru) Callens (NYC) (Israel) Kinda (SKC) (United States) Bedoya (PHI) (Hungary) Sallói (SKC) (United States) Dike (ORL) (Poland) Niezgoda (POR)	(France) Wilfried Nancy (MTL)
30	(United States) Miller (MIN)	(United States) Gutman (RBNY) (United States) Pines (DC) (United States) Herrera (RSL)	(Portugal) Santos (CLB) (Brazil) Urso (ORL) (Argentina) Moreno (ATL) (Colombia) Quintero (HOU)	(Colombia) Arango (LAFC) (Croatia) Kreilach (RSL) (United States) **Zardes** (CLB)	(United States) Willis (NSH) (United States) Paredes (DC) (Mexico) Araujo (LA) (Spain) Medrán (CHI) (Venezuela) Cásseres Jr. (RBNY) (United States) Kljestan (LA) (United States) White (VAN)	(United States) Pablo Mastroeni (RSL)
31	(England) Bond (LA)	(Venezuela) Makoun (MIA) (France) Camacho (MTL) (Brazil) Nathan (SJ)	(Brazil) Chú (SEA) (Argentina) Reynoso (MIN) (Germany) Mukhtar (NSH) (Colombia) Caicedo (VAN)	(Colombia) **Arango** (LAFC) (Poland) Buksa (NE) (Slovenia) Berić (CHI)	(United States) Turner (NE) (Scotland) Wilson (COL) (Argentina) Moreno (ATL) (Argentina) Fragapane (MIN) (United States) Kikanovic (SJ) (Hungary) Gazdag (PHI) (France) Cabral (LA)	(Italy) Vanni Sartini (VAN)
32	(United States) Slonina (CHI)	(Argentina) Galván (COL) (United States) Nealis (RBNY) (England) Elliot (PHI) (Angola) Gaspar (VAN)	(Cuba) Alonso (MIN) (France) Walter (SKC) (Finland) Ring (ATX)	(Argentina) G. Higuaín (MIA) (Poland) **Buksa** (NE) (Argentina) Castellanos (NYC)	(Canada) Pantemis (MTL) (Denmark) Amundsen (NYC) (United States) Trusty (COL) (Canada) Osorio (TOR) (United States) Lletget (LA) (Argentina) F. Higuaín (MIA) (Argentina) Jara (DAL)	(Norway) Ronny Deila (NYC)
33	(United States) Hamid (DC)	(Germany) Wagner (PHI) (United States) Kessler (NE) (South Korea) Moon-hwan (LAFC)	(Costa Rica) Leal (NSH) (Armenia) Zelarayán (CLB) (Ghana) Blessing (LAFC) (Iraq) Meram (RSL)	(Brazil) Araújo (ATL) (Colombia) Asprilla (POR) (Scotland) **Russell** (SKC)	(England) Blackman (LAFC) (United States) Birnbaum (DC) (United States) Parks (NYC) (Spain) Gil (NE) (Argentina) Barco (ATL) (United States) White (VAN) (United States) Sapong (NSH)	(United States) Bruce Arena (NE)
34	(United States) Johnson (NYC)	(United States) DePuy (LA) (Brazil) Carlos (ORL) (United States) Nealis (RBNY)	(Argentina) Fragapane (MIN) (United States) Ferreira (DAL) (Armenia) **Zelarayán** (CLB) (Hungary) Gazdag (PHI) (United States) Cowell (SJ)	(Argentina) Castellanos (NYC) (Mexico) Hernández (LA)	(Switzerland) Frei (SEA) (Mali) Dibassy (MIN) (Argentina) Reynoso (MIN) (United States) Parks (NYC) (Slovakia) Rusnák (RSL) (Germany) Mukhtar (NSH) (Senegal) Badji (COL)	(England) Adrian Heath (MIN)
35	(Canada) Crépeau (VAN)	(United States) Brody (RSL) (United States) Robinson (ATL) (France) Moreira (CLB)	(United States) Acosta (COL) (Argentina) Blanco (POR) (Scotland) Gauld (VAN) (Germany) Gressel (DC)	(Croatia) **Kreilach** (RSL) (Mexico) Hernández (LA) (United States) Lewis (COL)	(Peru) Gallese (ORL) (Argentina) González Pírez (MIA) (Finland) Lod (MIN) (United States) Stroud (ATX) (United States) Dike (ORL) (Argentina) Castellanos (NYC) (Norway) Kamara (DC)	(United States) Robin Fraser (COL)

=== Goal of the Week ===
Goal of the Week
Week	Player	Club	Ref.
1	(Brazil) João Paulo	Seattle Sounders FC	
2	(Argentina) Esequiel Barco	Atlanta United FC	
3	(Portugal) Nani	Orlando City SC	
4	(United States) Rubio Rubin	Real Salt Lake	
5	(United States) Cristian Roldan	Seattle Sounders FC	
6	(Argentina) Lucas Zelarayán	Columbus Crew	
7	(United States) Gianluca Busio	Sporting Kansas City	
8	(Norway) Jakob Glesnes	Philadelphia Union	
9	(Mexico) Efraín Álvarez	LA Galaxy	
10	(United States) Quinn Sullivan	Philadelphia Union	
11	(Venezuela) Cristian Cásseres Jr.	New York Red Bulls	
12	(Argentina) Lucas Zelarayán	Columbus Crew	
13	(Mexico) Carlos Vela	Los Angeles FC	
14	(Peru) Raúl Ruidíaz	Seattle Sounders FC	
15	(Argentina) Gustavo Bou	New England Revolution	
16	(Madagascar) Rayan Raveloson	LA Galaxy	
17	(Peru) Yordy Reyna	D.C. United	
18	(United States) Paxten Aaronson	Philadelphia Union	
19	(Colombia) Jimmy Medranda	Seattle Sounders FC	
20	(Peru) Raúl Ruidíaz	Seattle Sounders FC	
21	(United States) Quinn Sullivan	Philadelphia Union	
22	(Uruguay) Brian Rodríguez	Los Angeles FC	
23	(United States) Daryl Dike	Orlando City SC	
24	(Argentina) Esequiel Barco	Atlanta United FC	
25	(Brazil) Luiz Araújo	Atlanta United FC	
26	(Argentina) Esequiel Barco	Atlanta United FC	
27	(United States) McKinze Gaines	Austin FC	
28	(Ecuador) Anderson Julio	Real Salt Lake	
29	(Brazil) João Paulo	Seattle Sounders FC	
30	(Colombia) Darwin Quintero	Houston Dynamo FC	
31	(Serbia) Luka Stojanović	Chicago Fire FC	
32	(United States) Sebastian Lletget	LA Galaxy	
33	(Colombia) Dairon Asprilla	Portland Timbers	
34	(Armenia) Lucas Zelarayán	Columbus Crew	
35	(Venezuela) Josef Martínez	Atlanta United FC	
