= 2019 San Jose Earthquakes season =

San Jose Earthquakes
2019 season
- Head coach: Matías Almeyda
- Stadium: Avaya Stadium; San Jose, California
- MLS: Conference: 8th Overall: 15th
- MLS Cup Playoffs: Did not qualify
- U.S. Open Cup: Fourth round
- Top goalscorer: League: Chris Wondolowski (15); All: Chris Wondolowski (15)
- Highest home attendance: League/All: 50,850 vs LA Galaxy (June 29, Stanford Stadium); 18,000 vs Montreal Impact (March 2, Avaya Stadium)
- Lowest home attendance: League: 15,232 vs Chicago Fire (April 20); All: 7,553 vs. Sacramento Republic (June 11, USOC)
- Average home league attendance: Overall: 18,781; Avaya Stadium: 16,776; Stanford Stadium: 50,850
- Biggest win: +3 goals (5 times); SJ 3–0 POR (April 6); SJ 4–1 SKC (April 20); SJ 4–1 CHI (May 18); SJ 3–0 LA (June 29); SJ 3–0 ORL (August 31)
- Biggest defeat: SJ 0–5 LFC (March 30)
| Home colors | Away colors |

The 2019 season is the San Jose Earthquakes' 37th year of existence, their 22nd season in Major League Soccer and their 12th consecutive season in the top-flight of American soccer.

== Club ==
=== Roster ===
As of July 18, 2019

| No. | Position | Nation | Player |
|---|---|---|---|
| 3 | DF | SUI | François Affolter |
| 6 | MF | USA | Shea Salinas |
| 7 | FW | SWE | Magnus Eriksson |
| 8 | FW | USA | Chris Wondolowski (DP) |
| 9 | FW | NED | Danny Hoesen |
| 10 | FW | ARG | Cristian Espinoza (on loan from Villarreal) |
| 11 | MF | GEO | Vako Qazaishvili (DP) |
| 12 | GK | USA | Matt Bersano |
| 14 | MF | USA | Jackson Yueill (GA) |
| 15 | DF | USA | Jimmy Ockford |
| 17 | GK | ARG | Daniel Vega |
| 18 | GK | USA | JT Marcinkowski (HG) |
| 19 | MF | SOM | Siad Haji (GA) |
| 20 | MF | PAN | Aníbal Godoy |
| 21 | MF | MEX | Carlos Fierro |
| 22 | MF | USA | Tommy Thompson (HG) |
| 23 | DF | GER | Florian Jungwirth |
| 24 | DF | USA | Nick Lima (HG) |
| 26 | MF | USA | Eric Calvillo |
| 27 | DF | PER | Marcos López |
| 28 | GK | USA | Andrew Tarbell (GA) |
| 29 | DF | USA | Jacob Akanyirige (HG) |
| 31 | DF | PAN | Harold Cummings |
| 33 | DF | FRA | Paul Marie |
| 35 | MF | USA | Gilbert Fuentes (HG) |
| 37 | DF | GEO | Guram Kashia |
| 44 | FW | USA | Cade Cowell (HG) |
| 89 | MF | USA | Kevin Partida |
| 93 | MF | BRA | Judson (on loan from Tombense) |
| 96 | MF | USA | Luis Felipe |

== Exhibitions ==
Unless otherwise noted, all times in PST

| February 1 Preseason 1 | Pioneros de Cancún | 1–1 | San Jose Earthquakes | Cancún, MX |
| 15:00 (PST) | 25' | Report | Vako 20' | Stadium: Estadio Andrés Quintana Roo |

| February 9 Preseason 2 | Reno 1868 FC | 3–0 | San Jose Earthquakes | Reno, NV |
| 12:15 (PST) | Mendiola 4'; Casiple 29'; Musovski 41' | Report | | Stadium: Greater Nevada Field; Attendance: 3,143 |

| February 16 Preseason 3 | Los Angeles FC | 0–3 | San Jose Earthquakes | Los Angeles, CA |
| 12:00 (PST) | Segura (yellow card) 40'; Beitashour (yellow card) 57' | Report | Eriksson 15'; Wondolowski 30'; Godoy (yellow card) 40'; Lima (yellow card) 51'; Kashia (yellow card) 54'; Luis Felipe (yellow card) 77'; Vako 85' | Stadium: Banc of California Stadium; Attendance: Closed |

| February 23 Preseason 4 | San Jose Earthquakes | 2–2 | Seattle Sounders FC | San Jose, CA |
| 12:45 (PST) | Wondolowski 57' (pen.), 61' (pen.); Judson (yellow card) 83' | Report | Leerdam (yellow card) 20' (yellow-red card) 60'; Rodríguez 32', 52' | Stadium: Avaya Stadium |

| March 23 Friendly 1 | San Jose Earthquakes | 1–2 | C.F. Monterrey | San Jose, CA |
| 16:45 (PDT) | Marie (yellow card) 49'; Cowell 61' | Report | Funes Mori 6'; Vangioni (yellow card) 24'; Meza 25'; Medina (yellow card) 74' | Stadium: Avaya Stadium; Attendance: 11,022 |

| July 16 Friendly 2 | San Jose Earthquakes | 1–1 | Real Valladolid C.F. | San Jose, CA |
| 19:15 (PDT) | Affolter (yellow card) 25'; Cummings (yellow card) 33'; Wondolowski 60' | Report | De Frutos (yellow card) 26'; Ramírez 34' | Stadium: Avaya Stadium; Attendance: 10,729 |

== Competitions ==
=== Major League Soccer ===
==== Standings ====
2019 MLS Western Conference standings
| Pos | Team | Pld | W | L | T | GF | GA | GD | Pts | Qualification |
|---|---|---|---|---|---|---|---|---|---|---|
| 6 | Portland Timbers | 34 | 14 | 13 | 7 | 49 | 48 | +1 | 49 | Qualification for the first round |
| 7 | FC Dallas | 34 | 13 | 12 | 9 | 48 | 46 | +2 | 48 | Qualification for the first round |
| 8 | San Jose Earthquakes | 34 | 13 | 16 | 5 | 51 | 52 | −1 | 44 | |
| 9 | Colorado Rapids | 34 | 12 | 16 | 6 | 57 | 60 | −3 | 42 | |
| 10 | Houston Dynamo | 34 | 12 | 18 | 4 | 45 | 57 | −12 | 40 | |

Source: MLS
Rules for classification: 1) points; 2) total wins; 3) total goal differential; 4) total goals scored; 5) disciplinary points; 6) away goal differential; 7) away goals scored; 8) home goals scored; 9) home goal differential; 10) coin toss or drawing of lots

==== Match results ====
The Earthquakes announced their 2019 season schedule on January 7, 2019.

Va Win Draw Loss Upcoming fixture

Unless otherwise noted, all times in PDT

| March 2 1 | San Jose Earthquakes | 1–2 | Montreal Impact | San Jose, CA |
| 18:45 (PST) | Eriksson 11'; Cummings (yellow card) 66'; Thompson (yellow card) 73'; Judson (yellow card) 77' | | Piatti 29'; Taïder 44'; Sagna (yellow card) 45+1'; Azira (yellow card) 58'; Choinière (yellow card) 82'; Bush (yellow card) 90+5' | Stadium: Avaya Stadium; Attendance: 18,000; Referee: Joseph Dickerson |

| March 9 2 | San Jose Earthquakes | 0–3 | Minnesota United FC | San Jose, CA |
| 16:45 (PST) | Eriksson (yellow card) 3'; Godoy (yellow card) 61' | Report | Quintero 49' (pen.); Miguel Ibarra 52'; Schüller (yellow card) 65'; Cummings 75' (o.g.) | Stadium: Avaya Stadium; Attendance: 16,411; Referee: Marcos de Oliveira |

| March 16 3 | New York Red Bulls | 4–1 | San Jose Earthquakes | Harrison, NJ |
| 12:30 (PDT) | Muyl 51', 71'; Wright-Phillips 85'; Royer 89' | Report | Espinoza 5' | Stadium: Red Bull Arena; Attendance: 15,621; Referee: Rubiel Vazquez |

| March 30 4 | San Jose Earthquakes | 0–5 | Los Angeles FC | San Jose, CA |
| 12:30 (PDT) | Espinoza (yellow card) 34'; Godoy (yellow card) 53'; Cummings (yellow card) 57' | Report | Vela 8'; Beitashour 26'; Kaye (yellow card) 30'; Vela 45+3'; Atuesta (yellow card) 55'; Vela 66'; Rossi 67' | Stadium: Avaya Stadium; Attendance: 18,000; Referee: David Gantar |

| April 6 5 | San Jose Earthquakes | 3–0 | Portland Timbers | San Jose, CA |
| 17:00 (PDT) | Salinas 15'; López (yellow card) 28'; Hoesen 33'; Espinoza 34'; Eriksson (yellow card) 36'; Cummings (yellow card) 55' | Report | Mabiala (yellow card) 26' | Stadium: Avaya Stadium; Attendance: 16,233; Referee: Drew Fischer |

| April 13 6 | Houston Dynamo | 2–1 | San Jose Earthquakes | Houston, TX |
| 12:00 (PDT) | Figueroa (yellow card) 30'; Elis 52', (yellow card) 53'; Martínez 60'; Lundqvist (yellow card) 69' | Report | Thompson (yellow card) 28'; Godoy (yellow card) 34'; Yueill 56'; López (red card) 87' | Stadium: BBVA Compass Stadium; Attendance: 14,476; Referee: Baldomero Toledo |

| April 20 7 | San Jose Earthquakes | 4–1 | Sporting Kansas City | San Jose, CA |
| 21:00 (PDT) | Hoesen 6', 12'; Espinoza (yellow card) 45+2'; Godoy (yellow card) 45+5'; Salinas 46'; Thompson (yellow card) 54'; Eriksson 61' | Report | Sánchez (yellow card) 48'; Croizet (yellow card) 54'; Gutierrez 66' (pen.) | Stadium: Avaya Stadium; Attendance: 15,777; Referee: Rubiel Vazquez |

| April 24 8 | Seattle Sounders FC | 2–2 | San Jose Earthquakes | Seattle, WA |
| 19:30 (PDT) | Bwana (yellow card) 35'; Leerdam 65'; Shipp 67'; Lodeiro (yellow card) 77' | Boxscore | Salinas 34', 53'; Hoesen (yellow card) 70'; Felipe (yellow card) 87'; Wondolowski (yellow card) 90+5' | Stadium: CenturyLink Field; Attendance: 37,722; Referee: Fotis Bazakos |

| April 27 9 | FC Dallas | 0–0 | San Jose Earthquakes | Frisco, TX |
| 12:30 (PDT) | Barrios (yellow card) 43' | Report | Godoy (yellow card) 46'; Thompson (yellow card) 90+2' | Stadium: Toyota Stadium; Attendance: 14,087; Referee: Ramy Touchan |

| May 4 10 | San Jose Earthquakes | 1–0 | FC Cincinnati | San Jose, CA |
| 19:00 (PDT) | Salinas (yellow card) 13'; Espinoza (yellow card) 15' (yellow-red card) 51'; Lima 22', (yellow card) 29' | Report | Stanko (yellow card) 6'; Lasso (yellow card) 31'; Alashe (yellow card) 67' | Stadium: Avaya Stadium; Attendance: 16,743; Referee: David Gantar |

| May 11 11 | New England Revolution | 3–1 | San Jose Earthquakes | Foxborough, MA |
| 16:30 (PDT) | Agudelo 18'; Penilla 29' (pen.); Gil 68'; Turner (yellow card) 90+5' | Report | Cummings (yellow card) 25'; Qazaishvili 88' | Stadium: Gillette Stadium; Attendance: 20,610; Referee: Guido Gonzales, Jr. |

| May 18 12 | San Jose Earthquakes | 4–1 | Chicago Fire | San Jose, CA |
| 12:30 (PDT) | Wondolowski 21', 48', 74', 76'; Espinoza (yellow card) 54' | Report | Kappelhof (yellow card) 41'; Corrales (yellow card) 63'; Aleksandar Katai 83', (yellow card) 90+5'; Calvo (yellow card) 86' | Stadium: Avaya Stadium; Attendance: 15,232; Referee: Alex Chilowicz |

| May 26 13 | Toronto FC | 1–2 | San Jose Earthquakes | Toronto, ON |
| 16:30 (PDT) | Laryea 28'; Fraser (yellow card) 61' | Report | Thompson (yellow card) 33'; Wondolowski 37', 81'; Espinoza (yellow card) 64'; Eriksson (yellow card) 69' | Stadium: BMO Field; Attendance: 23,524; Referee: Nima Saghafi |

| June 1 14 | D.C. United | 1–1 | San Jose Earthquakes | Washington, D.C. |
| 17:00 (PDT) | Acosta 67'; Brillant (yellow card) 90+3'; Rooney (yellow card) 90+8'; Arriola (yellow card) 90+9' | Report | Wondolowski 37'; Qazaishvili (yellow card) 66'; Cummings (yellow card) 85'; Lima (yellow card) 90+2' | Stadium: Audi Field; Attendance: 18,002; Referee: Ramy Touchan |

| June 8 15 | San Jose Earthquakes | 2–2 | FC Dallas | San Jose, CA |
| 12:30 (PDT) | López (yellow card) 14'; Wondolowski 46'; Eriksson 54' | Report | Badji (yellow card) 13'; Vega 27' (o.g.); Atuahene 65'; Ferreira (yellow card) 90+1' | Stadium: Avaya Stadium; Attendance: 16,841; Referee: Ted Unkel |

| June 26 16 | San Jose Earthquakes | 2–0 | Houston Dynamo | San Jose, CA |
| 19:30 (PDT) | Qazaishvili 22', 75'; Kashia (yellow card) 77' | Report | Peña (yellow card) 17'; DeLaGarza (yellow card) 57'; McNamara (yellow card) 90+3' | Stadium: Avaya Stadium; Attendance: 15,563; Referee: Robert Sibiga |

| June 29 17 | San Jose Earthquakes | 3–0 | LA Galaxy | Stanford, CA |
| 19:00 (PDT) | Qazaishvili 11'; Salinas 82', (yellow card) 83'; Thompson 85' | Report | Polenta (yellow card) 51'; F. Álvarez (yellow card) 67' | Stadium: Stanford Stadium; Attendance: 50,850; Referee: Kevin Stott |

| July 3 18 | Minnesota United FC | 3–1 | San Jose Earthquakes | Saint Paul, MN |
| 17:00 (PDT) | Quintero 5', (yellow card) 78'; Finlay (yellow card) 45+1'; Boxall 52'; Greguš (yellow card) 76'; Alonso (yellow card) 90+1'; Molino 90+2', (yellow card) 90+3' | Report | López (yellow card) 30'; Thompson 45+2'; Wondolowski (yellow card) 55' | Stadium: Allianz Field; Attendance: 19,653; Referee: Marcos de Oliveira |

| July 6 19 | San Jose Earthquakes | 1–0 | Real Salt Lake | San Jose, CA |
| 19:30 (PDT) | Hoesen 90+3' | Report | Saucedo (yellow card) 86'; Baird (yellow card) 89' | Stadium: Avaya Stadium; Attendance: 15,339; Referee: Rubiel Vazquez |

| July 12 20 | LA Galaxy | 1–3 | San Jose Earthquakes | Carson, CA |
| 20:00 (PDT) | Feltscher 2'; Corona (yellow card) 31'; Skjelvik (yellow card) 32'; Ibrahimovic (yellow card) 89' | Report | Thompson (yellow card) 7'; Judson (yellow card) 56'; Vako 61'; Hoesen 63'; López (yellow card) 68'; Yueill 85' | Stadium: Dignity Health Sports Park; Attendance: 22,508; Referee: Nima Saghafi |

| July 20 21 | Vancouver Whitecaps FC | 1–3 | San Jose Earthquakes | Vancouver, BC |
| 19:00 (PDT) | Henry 7'; Reyna (yellow card) 84'; Bair (yellow card) 90+1' | Report | Qazaishvili 16'; Judson (yellow card) 32'; Wondolowski 34'; Lima (yellow card) 71'; Eriksson 79'; Marie (yellow card) 90+4' | Stadium: BC Place; Attendance: 17,558; Referee: Silviu Petrescu |

| July 27 22 | San Jose Earthquakes | 3–1 | Colorado Rapids | San Jose, CA |
| 18:00 (PDT) | | | | Stadium: Avaya Stadium; Attendance: 17,762; Referee: Baldomero Toledo |

| August 3 23 | San Jose Earthquakes | 1–1 | Columbus Crew SC | San Jose, CA |
| 18:45 (PDT) | Eriksson 41' (pen.), (yellow card) 83' | Report | Zardes 65'; Accam (yellow card) 75' | Stadium: Avaya Stadium; Attendance: 17,088; Referee: Alex Chilowicz |

| August 10 24 | Colorado Rapids | 2–1 | San Jose Earthquakes | Commerce City, CO |
| 18:00 (PDT) | Acosta 44'; Rubio 73', (yellow card) 78'; Price (yellow card) 90' | Report | Judson (yellow card) 55'; Qazaishvili 62'; Yueill (yellow card) 77' | Stadium: Dick's Sporting Goods Park; Attendance: 13,870; Referee: Timothy Ford |

| August 17 25 | Sporting Kansas City | 2–1 | San Jose Earthquakes | Kansas City, KS |
| 17:30 (PDT) | Feilhaber 50'; Espinoza (yellow card) 65'; Smith 76'; Russell (yellow card) 88' | Report | Wondolowski 25'; Judson (yellow card) 59'; Yueill (yellow card) 61' | Stadium: Children's Mercy Park; Attendance: 17,941; Referee: Drew Fischer |

| August 21 26 | Los Angeles FC | 4–0 | San Jose Earthquakes | Los Angeles, CA |
| 19:30 (PDT) | Rossi 6'; Vela 17' (pen.), 41'; Blessing (yellow card) 65'; Blackmon (yellow card) 74'; Jo. Pérez 81' | Report | Jungwirth (yellow card) 19'; Godoy (yellow card) 35' | Stadium: Banc of California Stadium; Attendance: 22,110; Referee: Kevin Stott |

| August 24 27 | San Jose Earthquakes | 3–1 | Vancouver Whitecaps FC | San Jose, CA |
| 18:45 (PDT) | Judson 7'; Jungwirth (yellow card) 31'; Wondolowski 34'; López (yellow card) 72'; Ríos 73' | Report | Nerwinski 6' | Stadium: Avaya Stadium; Attendance: 17,458; Referee: Ramy Touchan |

| August 31 28 | San Jose Earthquakes | 3–0 | Orlando City SC | San Jose, CA |
| 19:15 (PDT) | Eriksson 3'; Wondolowski 20', 33'; López (yellow card) 63' | Report | Higuita (yellow card) 59'; Dwyer (yellow card) 65'; Rosell (yellow card) 90' | Stadium: Avaya Stadium; Attendance: 17,323; Referee: Silviu Petrescu |

| September 11 29 | Real Salt Lake | 1–0 | San Jose Earthquakes | Sandy, UT |
| 18:30 (PDT) | Beckerman (yellow card) 31'; Lennon (yellow card) 60'; Kreilach 75' | Report | Judson (yellow card) 28'; Jungwirth (yellow card) 90+2'; Godoy (yellow card) 90+4' | Stadium: Rio Tinto Stadium; Attendance: 17,196; Referee: Joseph Dickerson |

| September 14 30 | New York City FC | 2–1 | San Jose Earthquakes | New York, NY |
| 9:30 (PDT) | Parks 40'; Mitriță 43'; Callens (yellow card) 55'; Johnson (yellow card) 90+4' | Report | Wondolowski 20'; Salinas (yellow card) 47'; Eriksson (yellow card) 76' | Stadium: Yankee Stadium; Attendance: 20,679; Referee: Rubiel Vazquez |

| September 21 31 | Atlanta United FC | 3–1 | San Jose Earthquakes | Atlanta, GA |
| 12:30 (PDT) | Meram 4', (yellow card) 24'; Hyndman (yellow card) 14', (goal) 90'; G. Martínez 90+2' | Report | Espinoza (yellow card) 16' (yellow-red card) 34'; Guzan 27' (o.g.); Vega (yellow card) 48'; Judson (yellow card) 62'; Wondolowski (red card) 90+1' | Stadium: Mercedes-Benz Stadium; Attendance: 43,451; Referee: Chris Penso |

| September 25 32 | San Jose Earthquakes | 1–2 | Philadelphia Union | San Jose, CA |
| 19:45 (PDT) | Judson (yellow card) 23'; Yueill 35' | Report | Wagner (yellow card) 7'; Medunjanin (yellow card) 45+1'; Przybyłko (yellow card) 57', (goal) 76'; Bedoya 70' | Stadium: Avaya Stadium; Attendance: 16,652; Referee: Baldomero Toledo |

| September 29 33 | San Jose Earthquakes | 0–1 | Seattle Sounders FC | San Jose, CA |
| 16:30 (PDT) | Thompson (red card) 56' | Boxscore | Arreaga (yellow card) 60' (yellow-red card) 71'; Tolo (yellow card) 87'; Morris 90+4' | Stadium: Avaya Stadium; Attendance: 18,000; Referee: Ismail Elfath |

| October 6 34 | Portland Timbers | 3–1 | San Jose Earthquakes | Portland, OR |
| 13:00 (PDT) | Mabiala 29'; Asprilla 59'; Chará (yellow card) 65'; Blanco 75'; Moreira (yellow card) 79'; Loría (yellow card) 85' | Report | Wondolowski 39'; Jungwirth (yellow card) 43'; Judson (yellow card) 51'; Kashia (yellow card) 74'; Ríos (yellow card) 90+3' | Stadium: Providence Park; Attendance: 25,218; Referee: Rubiel Vazquez |

=== U.S. Open Cup ===
| June 11 Fourth round | San Jose Earthquakes (California) | 4–3 | (California) Sacramento Republic FC | San Jose, CA |
| 19:30 (PDT) | Eriksson 10'; Calvillo (yellow card) 18'; Espinoza 38' (pen.); Qazaishvili 78', 90+1' | Report | Werner 2'; Bijev 14'; Mahoney (yellow card) 45'; Chantzopoulos (yellow card) 52'; Skundrich 90+3' | Stadium: Avaya Stadium; Attendance: 7,543; Referee: Mark Allatin |

| June 20 Round of 16 | Los Angeles FC (California) | 3–1 | (California) San Jose Earthquakes | Los Angeles, CA |
| 19:30 (PDT) | Rossi 35'; Diomande 60'; Atuesta (yellow card) 66'; Vela 66' | Report | Qazaishvili 7'; López (yellow card) 31'; Judson (yellow card) 52'; Thompson (yellow card) 90+1' | Stadium: Banc of California Stadium; Attendance: 14,028; Referee: Joe Dickerson |
