= Carlos Fierro =

Mexican footballer (born 1994)

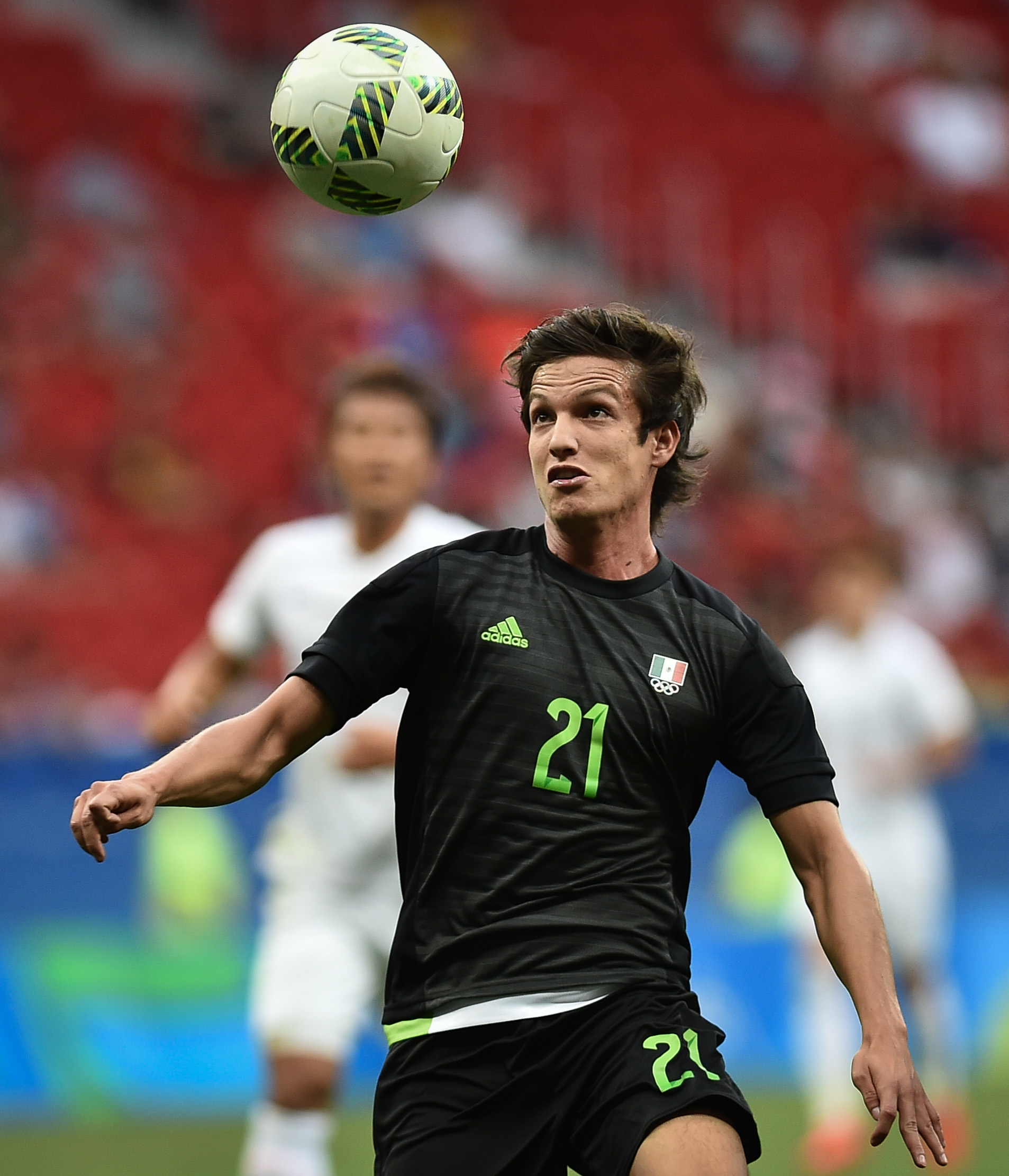
- Fierro with Mexico at the 2016 Summer Olympics

Personal information
- Full name: Carlos Eduardo Fierro Guerrero
- Date of birth: 24 July 1994 (age 32)
- Place of birth: Ahome, Sinaloa, Mexico
- Height: 1.75 m (5 ft 9 in)
- Position: Winger

Youth career
- 2008–2015: Guadalajara

Senior career*
Years	Team	Apps	(Gls)
2011–2018	Guadalajara	153	(11)
2016	→ Querétaro (loan)	22	(2)
2018–2019	Cruz Azul	13	(1)
2018–2019	→ Morelia (loan)	22	(0)
2019–2021	San Jose Earthquakes	51	(5)
2022	Juárez	11	(1)
2023–2026	UdeG	63	(10)

International career
2011	Mexico U17	7	(4)
2013	Mexico U20	3	(0)
2014–2016	Mexico U23	4	(0)
Medal record
Representing Mexico
First place	FIFA U-17 World Cup	2011 Mexico
First place	CONCACAF U-20 Championship	2013 Mexico
- * Club domestic league appearances and goals as of 12 April 2025

Carlos Eduardo Fierro Guerrero (born 24 July 1994) is a Mexican professional footballer who plays as a winger.

Fierro was a member of the Mexico national team that won the FIFA U-17 World Cup, held in Mexico in 2011. His performance in the tournament was recognized with the Bronze Ball award.

== Early life ==
Fierro was born on 24 July 1994 in Ahome, Sinaloa. His mother, Irma Guerrero, played a significant role in supporting his football career. He had an older brother, Gustavo Iván Fierro Guerrero, who died from cancer in 2011.

Fierro began playing football at the age of four for a club affiliated with Guadalajara in Sinaloa, where he was coached by Bernardo Chico Vonn. In 2007, his brother Gustavo moved to Jalisco to pursue a place with C.D. Guadalajara, and Fierro followed in his footsteps a year later. Both brothers appeared to be on the path to success: Carlos was playing for Guadalajara's youth teams, while Gustavo joined the club's second-division side.

However, Gustavo was later diagnosed with cancer and returned to Sinaloa, leaving Carlos alone in Jalisco. Although it seemed likely that Fierro would also return home, the family of Giovani Casillas—another Guadalajara youth player—took him in and supported him, allowing him to continue pursuing his dream of becoming a professional footballer.

== Club career ==
=== Guadalajara ===
==== 2011–14 ====
Fierro made his senior team debut for Guadalajara as a substitute on 20 August 2011, in a match against Monterrey coming in for Omar Arellano at the 76th minute. He was the most used substitute in the Apertura 2011 coming in as a sub on eight occasions. He was named to be in the initial line-up in the Copa Libertadores 2011 as a starter against Deportivo Quito, thus scoring his first official goal with the senior team in all competitions. The first time he completed an entire game was in week six of the Clausura 2012 when they were defeated by Monterrey. The tournament in which he managed to accumulate the most minutes was in the Clausura 2014, totaling 1,286 minutes with 16 caps. He suffered from an injury in the start of the Clausura 2014 and on another in mid-season, this affected Guadalajara as they had 9 players injured midway through the Clausura 2014.

==== 2014–15 season ====
Aldo and Bravo sometimes yell, scold, they scold us the younger players, but it's humbly, don't talk back, if they are nagging at you it's for something, for you to improve, for you to grow, accept what they ask and be thankful for all the help the bigger names bring."

— Carlos Fierro thankful to Bravo and de Nigris.

From the beginning of Liga MX and Copa MX Apertura 2014, Fierro has been capped 12 times and scored 3 goals, the same number of goals he scored in the 2013–14 season. As Guadalajara has never been in the second tier of Mexican football is struggling to avoid relegation, but still in hopes of fighting for the first positions, Fierro has stated his intent of consolidating himself as a starter for the club and taking that next step. Fierro has stated the support and guidance club legendary player Omar Bravo and Aldo de Nigris have shown him since his return to Guadalajara, even if it requires yelling and scolding.

On 7 September, Fierro scored a duet of goals against U de G in a 3–0 home win at Estadio Omnilife, scoring his first two goals of the season.

==== Loan at Querétaro ====
On 2 December 2015, Querétaro F.C. announced they had signed Fierro on a loan deal with the option of purchase. He made his official debut as a starter on 8 January 2016 at home against Atlas. He scored his first goal on 22 January 2016 in a home match against Sinaloa.

=== Return to Guadalajara ===
Fierro returned to the club for the 2017 season. After a year long loan to Querétaro he made his return on 7 January 2017, as a substitute against Pumas UNAM in a 2–1 victory.

=== Cruz Azul ===
On 8 December 2018, Cruz Azul announced the signing of Fierro for a fee of $3 million USD, about $55 million MXN.

==== Loan at Morelia ====
Fierro spent the 2018–19 season on loan at Morelia, joining the club on 6 June 2018.

=== Later career ===
On 25 June 2019, San Jose Earthquakes acquired Fierro from Cruz Azul for an undisclosed fee. Fierro, 24, played under Quakes head coach Matias Almeyda when the pair were at Chivas de Guadalajara, winning the 2015 Copa MX and the 2017 Clausura Liga MX title. The winger had his best form with Chivas, scoring 17 goals and adding 17 assists in 185 appearances. Following the 2021 season, San Jose declined their contract option on Fierro.

On 25 January 2022, Fierro joined FC Juárez. On 7 August 2023, he joined UdeG.

== Style of play ==
Fierro is known for his ability to become unmarked, and quickly mobile with the ball. While in play with or without the ball and having a decent shot with his right leg. He is also known for his fight, honor, intelligence and recovery of the ball while playing a defensive role. Most notably he is known for the decent technique when connecting the ball with the head also possessing good control while receiving the long through balls.

== Personal life ==
Fierro's older brother Gustavo Iván Fierro Guerrero was diagnosed with cancer in late 2008, Gustavo fought a battle against cancer for nearly 4 years. Exactly 2 months after Carlos and Mexico won the U-17 World Cup, Gustavo died in the Hospital Country 2011 of Guadalajara, Jalisco at the age of 22.

== International career ==
Fierro was a major key to the national team that won the U-17 World Cup in 2011. He scored his team's first goal in the tournament against North Korea. Fierro was one of the most important players for his team, scoring in the round of 16 and quarterfinals of the tournament. He was awarded the Adidas Bronze Ball for his exceptional performance at the end of the tournament. He dedicated every goal to his brother Gustavo who was diagnosed with cancer in late 2008.

== Career statistics ==
As of 18 March 2025

Appearances and goals by club, season and competition
Club	Season	League			Cup		Continental (Note: Includes appearances in Copa Libertadores and CONCACAF Champions League)		Other (Note: Includes 2017 Campeón de Campeones and MLS Cup Playoffs)		Total	
Club	Season	Division	Apps	Goals	Apps	Goals	Apps	Goals	Apps	Goals	Apps	Goals
Guadalajara	2011–12	Mexican Primera División	21	0	—		5	1	—		26	1
Guadalajara	2012–13	Liga MX	16	1	—		3	1	—		19	2
Guadalajara	2013–14	Liga MX	30	2	5	1	—		—		35	3
Guadalajara	2014–15	Liga MX	32	3	12	1	—		—		44	4
Guadalajara	2015	Liga MX	16	1	6	1	—		—		22	2
Guadalajara	2017	Liga MX	22	1	8	2	—		—		30	3
Guadalajara	2017	Liga MX	16	3	5	2	—		1	0	22	5
Guadalajara	Total		153	11	36	7	8	2	1	0	198	20
Querétaro (loan)	2016	Liga MX	14	2	—		2	0	—		16	2
Querétaro (loan)	2016	Liga MX	8	0	8	2	—		—		16	2
Querétaro (loan)	Total		22	2	8	2	2	0	—		32	4
Cruz Azul	2018	Liga MX	13	1	4	0	—		—		17	1
Morelia (loan)	2018	Liga MX	22	0	10	1	—		—		32	1
San Jose Earthquakes	2019	MLS	7	0	—		—		—		7	0
San Jose Earthquakes	2020	MLS	16	2	—		—		1	1	17	3
San Jose Earthquakes	2021	MLS	28	3	—		—		—		28	3
San Jose Earthquakes	Total		51	5	—		—		1	1	52	6
Juárez	2021–22	Liga MX	3	0	—		—		—		3	0
Juárez	2022–23	Liga MX	8	1	—		—		—		8	1
Juárez	Total		11	1	—		—		—		11	1
UdeG	2023–24	Liga MX	33	5	—		—		—		33	5
UdeG	2024–25	Liga MX	26	4	—		—		—		26	4
UdeG	Total		59	9	—		—		—		59	9
Career total			331	29	58	10	10	2	2	1	401	42

== Honours ==
Guadalajara

- Liga MX: Clausura 2017
- Copa MX: Apertura 2015, Clausura 2017

Querétaro

- Copa MX: Apertura 2016

Mexico Youth

- FIFA U-17 World Cup: 2011
- CONCACAF U-20 Championship: 2013

Individual

- FIFA U-17 World Cup Bronze Ball: 2011
