= Cade Cowell =

American soccer player (born 2003)

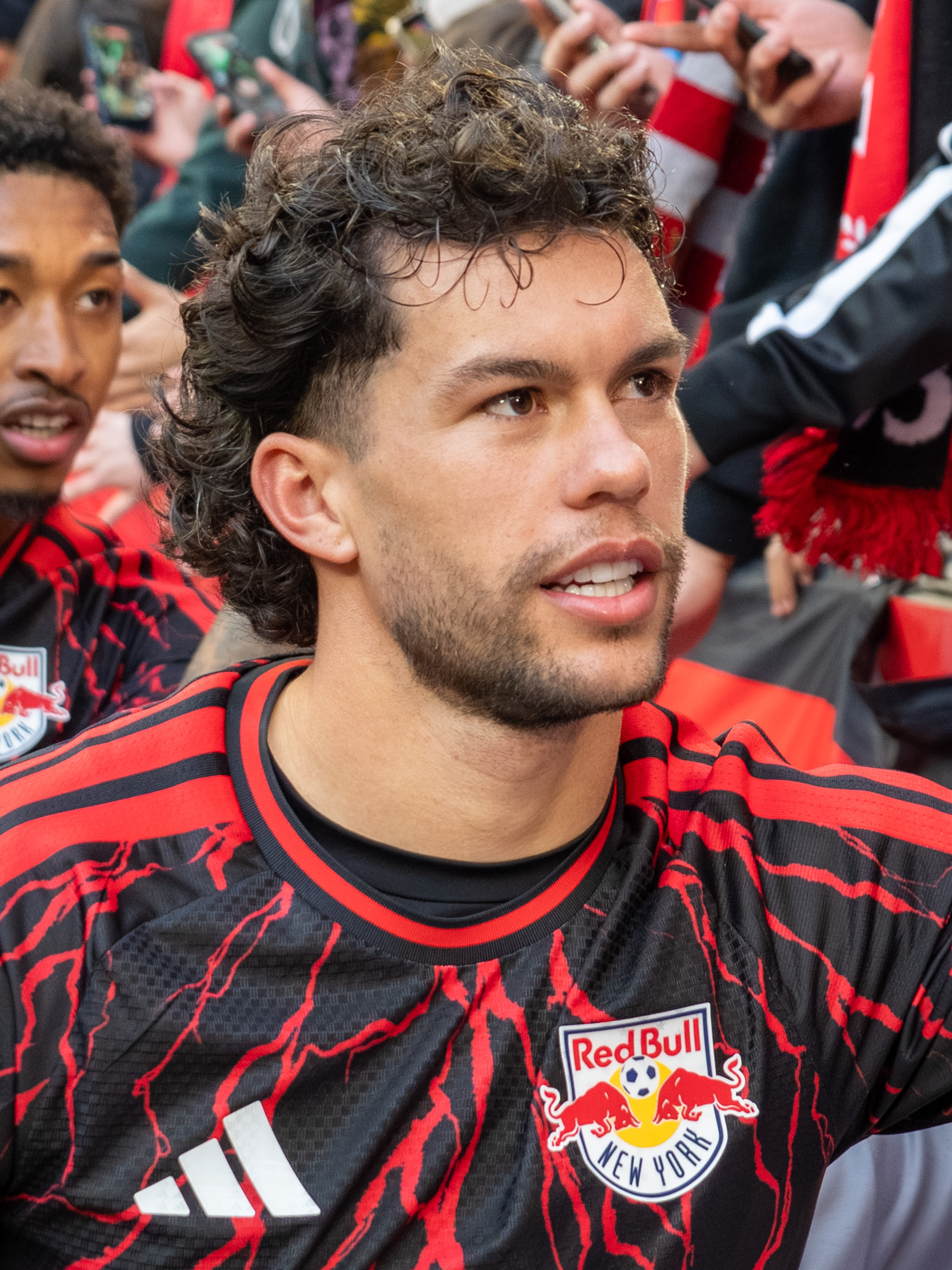
- Cowell with the New York Red Bulls in 2026

Personal information
- Full name: Cade Dylan Cowell
- Date of birth: October 14, 2003 (age 23)
- Place of birth: Ceres, California, US
- Height: 6 ft 0 in (1.83 m)
- Positions: Striker; winger

Team information
- Current team: New York Red Bulls (on loan from Guadalajara)
- Number: 7

Youth career
- 2015–2018: Ballistic United SC
- 2018–2019: San Jose Earthquakes

Senior career*
Years	Team	Apps	(Gls)
2019–2024	San Jose Earthquakes	104	(10)
2019	→ Reno 1868 (loan)	4	(1)
2024–	Guadalajara	56	(8)
2025–	→ New York Red Bulls (loan)	32	(4)

International career^{‡}
2019	United States U16	3	(0)
2018	United States U17	3	(1)
2021–2023	United States U20	11	(5)
2023–2024	United States U23	5	(1)
2021–2024	United States	11	(1)
Medal record
Men's soccer
Representing United States
CONCACAF U-20 Championship
Winner	2022 Honduras
- * Club domestic league appearances and goals as of 19:38, 15 November 2026 (UTC) ‡ National team caps and goals as of November 18, 2024

Cade Dylan Cowell (born October 14, 2003) is an American professional soccer player who plays as a striker or winger for Major League Soccer club New York Red Bulls, on loan from Liga MX club Guadalajara.

== Club career ==
=== Early career ===
Cowell began his academy career at Ballistic United in Pleasanton, and in 2017–18, he led the nation in goals with 34 in 32 games for the under-15 club, before joining the San Jose Earthquakes academy in 2018.

=== San Jose Earthquakes ===
On January 23, 2019, Cowell signed as a Homegrown Player with Major League Soccer side San Jose Earthquakes.

Cowell spent time on loan with San Jose's USL Championship affiliate club Reno 1868. He made his debut for Reno on June 8, 2019, and scored a 17th-minute goal during a 3–2 loss against San Antonio FC.

Cowell made his San Jose debut on June 11, 2019, as a 69th-minute substitute during a 4–3 win over Sacramento Republic in the 2019 U.S. Open Cup. On March 7, 2020, Cowell logged his first minutes in an official MLS match when he subbed on at half-time in a 5–2 loss against Minnesota United FC. On August 29, 2020, Cowell made his first MLS start against the LA Galaxy playing 67 minutes, scoring his first goal for the club in a 3–2 loss.

=== Guadalajara ===
After weeks of speculation, Cowell joined Liga MX club Guadalajara on a permanent transfer on January 15, 2024. Because of Guadalajara's historic policy of signing only Mexican players, Cowell had to complete the bureaucratic process to acquire Mexican citizenship through his mother before signing for the team. On February 8, 2024, Cowell scored his first two goals for Chivas in a 3–1 victory over Forge FC, in a CONCACAF Champions League match. On February 24, 2024, Cowell scored his first goal in Liga MX with Chivas in a 3–1 victory over Pumas UNAM.

==== Loan to New York Red Bulls ====
On December 17, 2025, the New York Red Bulls acquired Cowell on a one-year loan deal, with an option to make it a permanent transfer. Cowell expressed the hope that the move would see him make the United States national team for the 2026 FIFA World Cup as he said that he didn't fit Guadalajara's play style.

== International career ==
=== U.S. youth teams ===
Cowell was named to the United States national under-17 team for the 2018 Four Nations Tournament and scored his first international goal against Chile. The next spring, he was on the roster for the under-16 roster for the UEFA development tournament in Prague, Czech Republic. He was invited to the under-23 Olympic qualifying camp in January 2021 and was on the preliminary roster for both the under-23 Olympic squad in 2021.

In November 2021, Cowell was named to the United States national under-20 team for the 2021 Revelations Cup. In the 2023 FIFA U-20 World Cup, Cowell led the United States under-20 team by scoring three goals in the group stage of the tournament en route to a Group B victory.

=== U.S. national team ===
Cowell was on the United States preliminary roster for the 2021 CONCACAF Gold Cup. In December 2021, Cowell made his first senior appearance for the U.S. national team in a match against Bosnia and Herzegovina.

He is now cap-tied to the United States and scored his first international goal for the United States in a 6–0 victory over Trinidad and Tobago in the 2023 CONCACAF Gold Cup.

== Personal life ==
Cowell is of Mexican descent through his maternal line and was eligible to play for both the United States and Mexico national teams. His mother, Amber Maldonado Cowell, earned multiple accolades in multiple sports in high school, as did his father, Debin Slade Cowell, who played football for San Jose State. He is the eldest of three children. His brother Chance also plays professional soccer and is currently representing the United States at youth level. Cowell is a Christian.

== Career statistics ==
=== Club ===
As of match played November 6, 2026

Appearances and goals by club, season, and competition
Club	Season	League			National cup (Note: Includes U.S. Open Cup)		Continental		Other		Total	
Club	Season	Division	Apps	Goals	Apps	Goals	Apps	Goals	Apps	Goals	Apps	Goals
San Jose Earthquakes	2019	MLS	0	0	1	0	—		—		1	0
San Jose Earthquakes	2020	MLS	17	1	—		—		1 (Note: Appearance in MLS Cup Playoffs)	0	18	1
San Jose Earthquakes	2021	MLS	33	5	—		—		—		33	5
San Jose Earthquakes	2022	MLS	31	3	3	2	—		—		34	5
San Jose Earthquakes	2023	MLS	23	1	1	0	—		3 (Note: Two appearances in Leagues Cup, one appearance in MLS Cup playoffs)	0	27	1
San Jose Earthquakes	Total		104	10	5	2	—		4	0	113	12
Reno 1868 (loan)	2019	USL	4	1	—		—		—		4	1
Guadalajara	2023–24	Liga MX	18	1	—		4 (Note: Appearance(s) in CONCACAF Champions Cup)	3	—		22	4
Guadalajara	2024–25	Liga MX	24	5	—		4	0	2 (Note: Appearances in Leagues Cup)	1	30	6
Guadalajara	2025–26	Liga MX	14	2	—		0	0	3	0	17	2
Guadalajara	Total		56	8	—		8	3	5	1	69	12
New York Red Bulls (loan)	2026	MLS	32	4	2	0	—		—		34	4
Career total			196	23	7	2	8	3	9	1	220	29

=== International ===
As of match played November 18, 2024

Appearances and goals by national team and year
National team	Year	Apps	Goals
United States	2021	1	0
United States	2023	7	1
United States	2024	3	0
Total		11	1

Scores and results list the United States' goal tally first, score column indicates score after each Cowell's goal.

List of international goals scored by Cade Cowell
No.	Date	Venue	Cap	Opponent	Score	Result	Competition
1	July 2, 2023	Bank of America Stadium, Charlotte, United States	6	Trinidad and Tobago	4–0	6–0	2023 CONCACAF Gold Cup

== Honors ==
United States U20

- CONCACAF U-20 Championship: 2022

Individual

- MLS All-Star: 2021
- IFFHS CONCACAF Youth (U20) Best XI: 2023
- Liga MX Player of the Month: July 2024
- Liga MX Goal of the Month: July 2024
