= Javier Pérez (football manager) =

Football coach

Personal information
- Date of birth: 16 May 1977 (age 49)
- Place of birth: Valladolid, Spain
- Height: 1.85 m (6 ft 1 in)

Managerial career
- Years: Team
- 2001–2007: Real Madrid (youth)
- 2012–2015: United States U18
- 2012–2015: United States U20 (assistant)
- 2014–2015: United States (assistant)
- 2016–2020: New York City FC (assistant)
- 2021: Toronto FC (assistant)
- 2021: Toronto FC

Javier Pérez (born 16 May 1977) is a Spanish football coach.

== Coaching career ==
He was a youth coach with Real Madrid's youth teams from U9-U19 teams.

In 2012, he began working with the United States Soccer Federation, serving as head coach with the United States U18 team and an assistant with the United States U20 team. In 2014, he became an assistant for the United States senior team under Jürgen Klinsmann

In December 2015, he was named as an assistant coach of New York City FC of Major League Soccer under Patrick Vieira, remaining with the club after Vieria's departure under Domènec Torrent .

In 2021, he joined Toronto FC as an assistant under new coach Chris Armas. On 4 July, he was named interim coach for Toronto, following the firing of Armas. On 7 July, in his debut as head coach, Toronto defeated the New England Revolution by a score of 3–2. On 9 August, he was officially named the head coach for the remainder of the season, removing the interim title. He departed the club at the end of the season.

In April 2024, Pérez joined Atlanta United as director of methodology under vice-president and technical director Carlos Bocanegra.

== Personal ==
Pérez holds a UEFA Pro Licence, UEFA's highest coaching certificate, from the Royal Spanish Football Federation and a UEFA A Licence from the English Football Association. He also has a Ph.D. in Sports Science from Universidad De León (University of León) in Spain. Pérez speaks Spanish, English, French and German.

Pérez wrote the U.S. Soccer Coaching Curriculum with Claudio Reyna.

== Coaching statistics ==
As of 23 November 2021

Coaching record by team and tenure
Team	Nat.	From	To	Record				
Team	Nat.	From	To	G	W	D	L	Win %
Toronto FC	CAN	4 July 2021	23 November 2021	26	7	8	11	26.92
Total				26	7	8	11	26.92
