= Javier Eduardo López =

Mexican footballer (born 1994)

Personal information
- Full name: Javier Eduardo López Ramírez
- Date of birth: 17 September 1994 (age 32)
- Place of birth: Torreón, Coahuila, Mexico
- Height: 1.67 m (5 ft 6 in)
- Positions: Attacking midfielder; winger

Youth career
- 2010–2013: Guadalajara

Senior career*
Years	Team	Apps	(Gls)
2013–2022	Guadalajara	141	(16)
2021–2022	→ San Jose Earthquakes (loan)	36	(13)
2022–2025	Pachuca	64	(11)
- * Club domestic league appearances and goals as of 19 August 2025

Javier Eduardo López Ramírez (born 17 September 1994), also known as "La Chofis", is a Mexican former professional footballer who played as an attacking midfielder.

== Club career ==
=== Youth career ===
López started his youth career in the soccer academy Centro de Sinergia Futbolística (CESIFUT) based in Lerdo, Durango.

=== Guadalajara ===
López made his professional debut on 24 February 2013, against León.

Following an injury that left him out for a couple of weeks, he scored his first Liga MX goals against Monterrey on 19 March 2016, scoring a brace. He won a championship with Guadalajara on 28 May 2017. In January 2019, López had an operation on his knee. He returned in late March during a friendly game against Zacatepec in a 2–0 win with Lopez scoring the first goal.

On 5 November 2020, López was suspended by Guadalajara due to an allegation of sexual abuse made against teammate Dieter Villalpando at a party that was also attended by López and three other teammates.

==== Loan to San Jose Earthquakes ====
On 20 January 2021, López signed on loan with Major League Soccer side San Jose Earthquakes, joining his former coach Matias Almeyda. López earned the MLS Player of the Month award for September 2021, scoring six goals and one assist in six matches during the month. López was named among the three finalists for the 2021 MLS Newcomer of the Year Award. He ultimately would lose the award to Los Angeles FC forward Cristian Arango. In late November 2021 it was reported that López had signed a six-month contract extension that would see him continue with San Jose through June 2022. On 4 July 2022, the Earthquakes announced that López had concluded his 18-month loan with the club and would return to Guadalajara.

=== Pachuca ===
On 18 July 2022, Pachuca reached an agreement to sign López. In July 2024, Pachuca boss Guillermo Almada dropped López from the squad after he showed up overweight for pre-season. He was released on 23 October 2025.

== Personal life ==
Javier's younger brother, Brayam was also a footballer who played as a midfielder for Guadalajara's U-20 team.

He is nicknamed La Chofis because teammates pointed out that López looked like former teammate Giovani Casillas' ex-girlfriend named Sofia.

== Career statistics ==
=== Club ===
As of 28 March 2024

Appearances and goals by club, season and competition
Club	Season	League			Cup		Continental		Other		Total	
Club	Season	Division	Apps	Goals	Apps	Goals	Apps	Goals	Apps	Goals	Apps	Goals
Guadalajara	2012–13	Liga MX	3	0	—		—		—		3	0
Guadalajara	2013–14	Liga MX	6	0	9	3	—		—		15	3
Guadalajara	2014–15	Liga MX	—		4	0	—		—		4	0
Guadalajara	2015–16	Liga MX	15	3	4	0	—		—		19	3
Guadalajara	2016–17	Liga MX	38	2	14	3	—		1 (Note: Appearance in Supercopa MX)	0	53	5
Guadalajara	2017–18	Liga MX	30	3	5	0	5 (Note: Appearances in CONCACAF Champions Cup)	1	—		40	4
Guadalajara	2018–19	Liga MX	18	2	5	1	—		1 (Note: Appearance in FIFA Club World Cup)	0	24	3
Guadalajara	2019–20	Liga MX	22	6	3	0	—		2 (Note: Appearances in International Champions Cup)	1	27	7
Guadalajara	2020–21	Liga MX	9	0	—		—		—		9	0
Guadalajara	Total		141	16	44	7	5	1	4	1	194	25
San Jose Earthquakes (loan)	2021	MLS	32	12	—		—		—		32	12
San Jose Earthquakes (loan)	2022	MLS	4	1	—		—		—		4	1
San Jose Earthquakes (loan)	Total		36	13	—		—		—		36	13
Pachuca	2022–23	Liga MX	30	9	—		2	0	—		32	9
Pachuca	2023–24	Liga MX	16	1	—		1	0	—		17	1
Pachuca	2024–25	Liga MX	0	0	—		—		—		0	0
Pachuca	Total		46	10	—		3	0	—		49	10
Career Total			223	39	44	7	8	1	4	1	279	48

== Honours ==
Guadalajara

- Liga MX: Clausura 2017
- Copa MX: Apertura 2015, Clausura 2017
- Supercopa MX: 2016
- CONCACAF Champions League: 2018

Pachuca

- Liga MX: Apertura 2022
- CONCACAF Champions Cup: 2024
