= Nathan (footballer, born 1995) =

Brazilian footballer

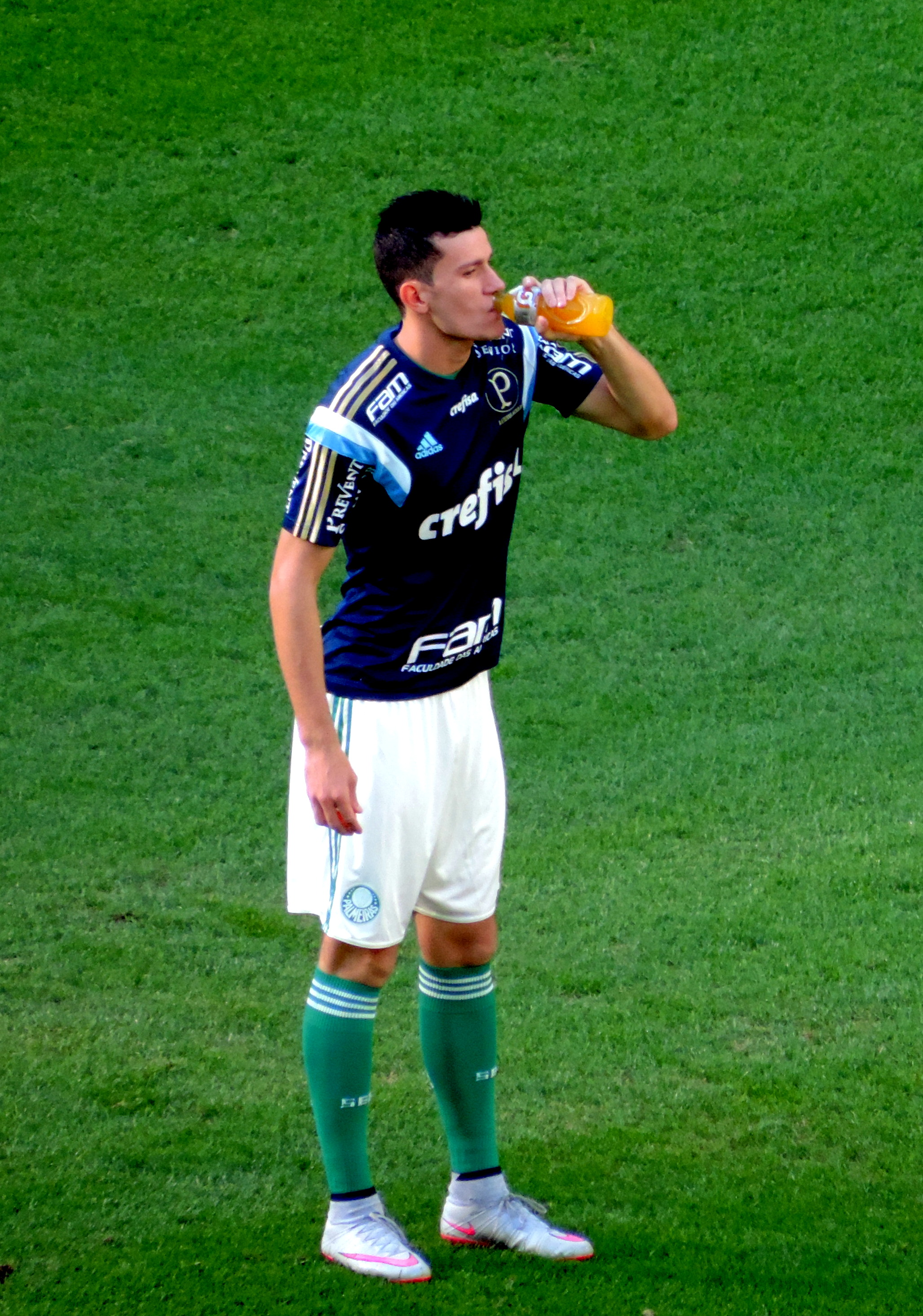
- Nathan playing for Palmeiras in 2015

Personal information
- Full name: Nathan Raphael Pelae Cardoso
- Date of birth: 13 May 1995 (age 31)
- Place of birth: São Paulo, Brazil
- Height: 1.89 m (6 ft 2 in)
- Position: Centre back

Team information
- Current team: América Mineiro
- Number: 3

Youth career
- 2007–2014: Palmeiras

Senior career*
Years	Team	Apps	(Gls)
2014–2019	Palmeiras	16	(0)
2016	→ Criciúma (loan)	17	(2)
2017	→ Chapecoense (loan)	1	(0)
2017–2018	→ Servette (loan)	28	(3)
2018–2019	→ Grasshoppers (loan)	9	(1)
2019–2021	FC Zürich	60	(3)
2021–2023	San Jose Earthquakes	46	(5)
2024	Seattle Sounders FC	4	(0)
2024	Tacoma Defiance	4	(0)
2025	Cuiabá	26	(1)
2026–	América Mineiro	8	(1)

International career
2015	Brazil U20	5	(0)
- * Club domestic league appearances and goals as of 16 April 2026

Nathan Raphael Pelae Cardoso (born 13 May 1995), simply known as Nathan, is a Brazilian professional footballer who last played as a central defender for América Mineiro.

He played for the youth and senior teams of SE Palmeiras in Brazil's top flight and was later loaned to various clubs in Brazil and Switzerland. Nathan was transferred to FC Zürich in the Swiss Super League in 2019 and played for two years there. He joined MLS club San Jose Earthquakes in 2021.

Nathan played in 46 matches for San Jose during the 2021 and 2022 seasons with limited availability due to injuries. He underwent surgery after tearing his left knee's meniscus in February 2022 and played 26 matches during the regular season. Nathan was unable to play during the 2023 season after he tore his right anterior cruciate ligament tear during preseason. He was signed by Seattle Sounders FC in January 2024, but injured his hamstring in May. He played six matches during the season and returned during the 2024 MLS Cup playoffs, where he started in the Western Conference against the LA Galaxy. His contract option for the 2025 season was declined by the Sounders on 4 December 2024.

== Honours ==
Palmeiras

- Copa do Brasil: 2015

Chapecoense

- Campeonato Catarinense: 2017
