= Daniel Vega (footballer, born 1984) =

Argentine footballer

Personal information
- Full name: Mario Daniel Vega
- Date of birth: 3 June 1984 (age 42)
- Place of birth: Cutral Có, Neuquén, Argentina
- Height: 1.89 m (6 ft 2 in)
- Position: Goalkeeper

Team information
- Current team: Monterrey (assistant)

Senior career*
Years	Team	Apps	(Gls)
2005–2007	Nueva Chicago	58	(0)
2007–2012	River Plate	76	(0)
2013–2015	Anorthosis Famagusta	15	(0)
2016–2018	Miami FC	64	(0)
2018	→ Miami FC 2 (loan)	11	(0)
2018	Tampa Bay Rowdies	10	(0)
2019–2021	San Jose Earthquakes	47	(0)
Total		281	(0)

Managerial career
- 2022: San Jose Earthquakes (assistant)
- 2022–2025: AEK Athens (assistant)
- 2025–2026: Sevilla (assistant)
- 2026–: Monterrey (assistant)
- * Club domestic league appearances and goals as of 4 December 2021

Mario Daniel Vega (born 3 June 1984) is an Argentine former professional footballer who played as a goalkeeper. He is the current assistant manager of Liga MX club Monterrey.

== Career ==
Arriving from Nueva Chicago for the 2007–08 season he is at the start of the season considered to be River's fourth-choice keeper after the unexpected return of Juan Pablo Carrizo.

Vega was part of the River Plate squad that won the Clausura 2008 tournament, but he did not play in any of the games.

=== Anorthosis Famagusta ===
On 2 September 2013, Anorthosis Famagusta announced the contract agreement with Mario Vega.

In November 2013, Vega assumed the role of starting goalkeeper following an injury to Anorthosis Famagusta's starting keeper Mathieu Valverde.

=== Miami FC ===
In September 2016, Vega signed with Miami FC of the North American Soccer League. Vega played in 64 regular season games for Miami from 2016 to 2017. After the dissolution of the NASL, Vega stayed with the team as they played as Miami FC 2 in the National Premier Soccer League, winning the 2018 NPSL championship in August.

=== Tampa Bay Rowdies ===
Following the conclusion of the National Premier Soccer League season, Vega signed with the Tampa Bay Rowdies for the remainder of their United Soccer League season.

=== San Jose Earthquakes ===
On 18 January 2019, Vega signed with Major League Soccer's San Jose Earthquakes. Following the 2021 season, Vega's contract with San Jose expired.
