= Judson (footballer, born 1993) =

Brazilian association football player

Personal information
- Full name: Judson Silva Tavares
- Date of birth: 25 May 1993 (age 33)
- Place of birth: Arês, Brazil
- Height: 1.69 m (5 ft 6 1/2 in)
- Position: Midfielder

Team information
- Current team: Monterey Bay FC
- Number: 93

Youth career
- 2010: ABC
- 2011: América–RN

Senior career*
Years	Team	Apps	(Gls)
2011–2015	América–RN	24	(1)
2012	→ Santa Cruz (loan)		
2012	→ Carpina (loan)		
2013	→ Coríntians (loan)		
2013	→ Potiguar de Mossoró (loan)	2	(0)
2013	→ Globo (loan)		
2016–2019	Tombense	0	(0)
2016–2018	→ Avaí (loan)	81	(1)
2019	→ San Jose Earthquakes (loan)	27	(1)
2020–2023	San Jose Earthquakes	80	(0)
2022	San Jose Earthquakes II	1	(0)
2024–2025	Avai	18	(0)
2026	América–RN	5	(0)
2026–	Monterey Bay FC	6	(0)
- * Club domestic league appearances and goals as of 18:52, 9 November 2026 (UTC)

Judson Silva Tavares (born 25 May 1993 in Arês), simply known as Judson, is a Brazilian professional footballer who plays as a midfielder for Monterey Bay FC in the USL Championship.

== Professional Career ==
After spending the three previous years on loan at Avaí, Judson was loaned from Tombense to the San Jose Earthquakes for the duration of the 2019 Major League Soccer season with an option to purchase. Following the season, San Jose activated the purchase option and brought in Judson on a permanent transfer. Judson was named the Earthquakes' Defensive Player of the Year after the 2020 season.

In December 2022, the San Jose signed Judson through the 2023 season with an option for 2024.

After a decade away, Judson returned to his first professional club, América de Natal, in October 2025, ahead of the 2026 Campeonato Brasileiro Série D. Following the conclusion of the Serie D season in August, Judson announced his departure from the club. Later that same month, Monterey Bay FC of the USL Championship announced they had signed Judson.

== Career statistics ==
As of 9 August 2017

Club	Season	League			State League		Cup		Continental		Other		Total	
Club	Season	Division	Apps	Goals	Apps	Goals	Apps	Goals	Apps	Goals	Apps	Goals	Apps	Goals
Potiguar de Mossoró	2013	Série D	2	0	—		—		—		—		2	0
América–RN	2014	Série B	7	0	8	0	2	0	—		2	0	19	0
América–RN	2015	Série C	17	1	15	1	5	0	—		8	0	45	2
América–RN	Subtotal		24	1	23	1	7	0	—		10	0	64	2
Avaí	2016	Série B	15	0	12	0	2	0	—		—		29	0
Avaí	2017	Série A	17	0	12	0	1	0	—		2	0	32	0
Avaí	Subtotal		32	0	24	0	3	0	—		2	0	61	0
Career total			58	1	47	1	10	0	0	0	12	0	127	2

== Honours ==
América-RN

- Campeonato Potiguar: 2014, 2015

Avaí

- Campeonato Catarinense: 2025
