= 2018 San Jose Earthquakes season =

San Jose Earthquakes
2018 season
- Chairman: Earthquakes Soccer, LLC
- Coach: Mikael Stahre (until September 17); Steve Ralston (September 17 - end of 2018 season)
- Stadium: Avaya Stadium (Primary); Stanford Stadium (1 League game)
- Major League Soccer: Conference: 12th Overall: 23rd
- MLS Cup Playoffs: DNQ
- U.S. Open Cup: Fourth round (2-0 loss vs. Portland Timbers)
- Heritage Cup: 2nd (1-3)
- Top goalscorer: League: Valeri Qazaishvili & Chris Wondolowski (10); All: Valeri Qazaishvili & Chris Wondolowski (10)
| Home colors | Away colors |

The 2018 San Jose Earthquakes season was the club's 36th year of existence, their 21st season in Major League Soccer and their 11th consecutive season in the top-flight of American soccer.

== Background ==
The 2017 season was one of continued change under the leadership of general manager Jesse Fioranelli, with head coach Dominic Kinnear and assistant coach John Spencer being replaced by San Jose's technical director Chris Leitch and Director of Methodology Alex Covelo on June 25, 2017. The San Jose Earthquakes finished the 2017 season with a victory over Minnesota United FC that sent them to the MLS playoffs for the first time since 2012.

On November 24, 2017, the Earthquakes announced their second coaching change of the year with Mikael Stahre taking on the role of head coach. Leitch and Covelo would return to their former positions of technical director and director of methodology respectively.

== Current squad ==
=== Roster ===
As of June 13, 2018.

| Number | Nat. | Player | Position | Date of birth | Previous club | Appearances | 2018 MLS Goals | 2018 MLS Assists | Notes |
Goalkeepers
| 12 | (United States) | Matt Bersano | GK | September 10, 1992 (age 33) | (United States) Seattle Sounders FC 2 | – | – | – | – |
| 18 | (United States) | JT Marcinkowski | GK | May 9, 1997 (age 29) | (United States) Georgetown Hoyas | – | – | – | Homegrown Player |
| 28 | (United States) | Andrew Tarbell | GK | October 7, 1993 (age 32) | (United States) Clemson Tigers | 14 | – | – | Generation Adidas |
Defenders
| 2 | (Sweden) | Joel Qwiberg | DF | October 9, 1992 (age 33) | (Sweden) Brommapojkarna | 1 | – | – | – |
| 3 | (Switzerland) | François Affolter | DF | March 13, 1991 (age 35) | (Switzerland) FC Luzern | 4 | – | – | – |
| 24 | (United States) | Nick Lima | DF | November 17, 1994 (age 31) | (United States) California Golden Bears | 14 | 1 | 1 | Homegrown Player |
| 26 | (United States) | Jacob Akanyirige | DF | December 31, 2001 (age 24) | (United States) San Jose Earthquakes Academy | – | – | – | Homegrown Player |
| 30 | (Uruguay) | Yeferson Quintana | DF | April 19, 1996 (age 30) | (Uruguay) Peñarol | 9 | 1 | 1 | On loan from (Uruguay) Peñarol |
| 31 | (Panama) | Harold Cummings | DF | March 1, 1992 (age 34) | (Costa Rica) Alajuelense | 10 | – | – | – |
| 55 | (United States) | Jimmy Ockford | DF | June 10, 1992 (age 34) | (United States) Reno 1868 | 7 | – | – | – |
Midfielders
| 6 | (United States) | Shea Salinas | MF | June 24, 1986 (age 40) | (United States) Vancouver Whitecaps FC | 10 | – | – | – |
| 7 | (Sweden) | Magnus Eriksson | MF | April 8, 1990 (age 36) | (Sweden) Djurgårdens IF | 14 | 3 | 3 | DP |
| 10 | (Albania) | Jahmir Hyka | MF | March 8, 1988 (age 38) | (Switzerland) FC Luzern | 4 | 1 | – | – |
| 11 | (Georgia (country)) | Valeri Qazaishvili | MF | January 29, 1993 (age 33) | (Poland) Legia Warszawa (loan from (Netherlands) Vitesse) | 14 | 3 | 4 | DP |
| 14 | (United States) | Jackson Yueill | MF | March 18, 1997 (age 29) | (United States) UCLA Bruins | 9 | – | 2 | Generation Adidas |
| 16 | (United States) | Chris Wehan | MF | January 29, 1994 (age 32) | (United States) Reno 1868 | 3 | – | – | – |
| 20 | (Panama) | Aníbal Godoy | MF | February 10, 1990 (age 36) | (Hungary) Honvéd | 12 | – | 1 | – |
| 22 | (United States) | Tommy Thompson | MF | August 15, 1995 (age 30) | (United States) Indiana Hoosiers | 5 | – | – | Homegrown Player |
| 23 | (Germany) | Florian Jungwirth | DF | January 27, 1989 (age 37) | (Germany) Darmstadt 98 | 14 | 2 | 3 | – |
| 27 | (United States) | Fatai Alashe | MF | October 21, 1993 (age 32) | (United States) Michigan State Spartans | 8 | – | – | – |
| 29 | (United States) | Eric Calvillo | MF | January 2, 1998 (age 28) | (United States) NY Cosmos | – | – | – | – |
| 35 | (United States) | Gilbert Fuentes | MF | February 21, 2002 (age 24) | (United States) San Jose Earthquakes Academy | – | – | – | Homegrown Player |
| 89 | (United States) | Kevin Partida | MF | March 10, 1995 (age 31) | (United States) Reno 1868 | 1 | – | – | On loan from Reno 1868 |
Forwards
| 8 | (United States) | Chris Wondolowski | FW | January 28, 1983 (age 43) | (United States) Houston Dynamo | 14 | 4 | 3 | Captain; DP |
| 9 | (Netherlands) | Danny Hoesen | FW | January 15, 1991 (age 35) | (Netherlands) Groningen | 14 | 7 | 4 | – |
| 17 | (United States) | Mohamed Thiaw | FW | January 24, 1995 (age 31) | (United States) Louisville Cardinals | – | – | – | On loan to (United States) Reno 1868 |
| 19 | (United States) | Danny Musovski | FW | November 30, 1995 (age 30) | (United States) UNLV Rebels | – | – | – | On loan to (United States) Reno 1868 |
| 25 | (United States) | Quincy Amarikwa | FW | October 29, 1987 (age 38) | (United States) Chicago Fire | 10 | – | 1 | – |
| 96 | (United States) | Luis Felipe | FW | January 29, 1996 (age 30) | (United States) Reno 1868 | – | – | – | – |

== Non-competitive ==
| January 31 Preseason | San Jose Earthquakes | 0–0 | Portland Timbers | Tucson, Arizona |
| 10:00 PST | Marie (red card) 7' | Report | Guzmán (yellow card) 30'; Zambrano (red card) 57'; Flores (yellow card) 63' | Stadium: Kino Sports Complex |
Note: Played as three 30-minute periods.

| February 7 Preseason | Real Salt Lake | 1–1 | San Jose Earthquakes | Tucson, Arizona |
| PST | Acosta (yellow card) 34'; Ortuño 55' | Report | Salinas (yellow card) 43'; Amarikwa 60' | Stadium: Kino Sports Complex; Referee: Baldomero Toledo |

| February 10 Preseason | San Jose Earthquakes | 4–0 | Reno 1868 FC | San Jose, California |
| 14:00 PST | Hoesen 5', 21'; Eriksson 25', 37' | Report | | Stadium: Avaya Stadium |

| February 17 Preseason | LA Galaxy | 2–4 | San Jose Earthquakes | Irvine, California |
| 14:00 PST | Kamara 36', 74'; Carrasco (yellow card) 77'; Büscher (yellow card) 88' | Report | Jungwirth (yellow card) 10'; Wondolowski 38'; Thompson 54', 90'; Alashe 55' | Stadium: Orange County Great Park; Attendance: 5,015 |

| March 24 Friendly | San Jose Earthquakes | 0–1 | Club León | San Jose, California |
| 19:30 PST | Affolter (yellow card) 35' | Report | Donovan 19'; Montes (yellow card) 33'; Mosquera (yellow card) 42'; Burdisso (yellow card) 42'; Herrera (yellow card) 79'; Jose Hernández (yellow card) 90' | Stadium: Avaya Stadium; Attendance: 14,532 |

| July 22 Friendly | San Jose Earthquakes | 0–0 | Manchester United | Santa Clara, California |
| 14:00 PST | Florian Jungwirth (yellow card) 17'; Anibal Godoy (yellow card) 52' | Report | | Stadium: Levi's Stadium; Attendance: 32,549 |

== Competitive ==
=== Major League Soccer ===
==== Standings ====
Western Conference Table

| Pos | Team | Pld | W | L | T | GF | GA | GD | Pts |
|---|---|---|---|---|---|---|---|---|---|
| 8 | Vancouver Whitecaps FC | 34 | 13 | 13 | 8 | 54 | 67 | −13 | 47 |
| 9 | Houston Dynamo | 34 | 10 | 16 | 8 | 58 | 58 | 0 | 38 |
| 10 | Minnesota United FC | 34 | 11 | 20 | 3 | 49 | 71 | −22 | 36 |
| 11 | Colorado Rapids | 34 | 8 | 19 | 7 | 36 | 63 | −27 | 31 |
| 12 | San Jose Earthquakes | 34 | 4 | 21 | 9 | 49 | 71 | −22 | 21 |

Source: MLS

Overall table

| Pos | Team | Pld | W | L | T | GF | GA | GD | Pts | Qualification |
|---|---|---|---|---|---|---|---|---|---|---|
| 19 | Toronto FC | 34 | 10 | 18 | 6 | 59 | 64 | −5 | 36 | CONCACAF Champions League |
| 20 | Chicago Fire | 34 | 8 | 18 | 8 | 48 | 61 | −13 | 32 | |
| 21 | Colorado Rapids | 34 | 8 | 19 | 7 | 36 | 63 | −27 | 31 | |
| 22 | Orlando City SC | 34 | 8 | 22 | 4 | 43 | 74 | −31 | 28 | |
| 23 | San Jose Earthquakes | 34 | 4 | 21 | 9 | 49 | 71 | −22 | 21 | |

Source: MLS
Rules for classification: 1) points; 2) total wins; 3) total goal differential; 4) total goals scored; 5) disciplinary points; 6) away goals scored; 7) away goal differential; 8) coin toss or drawing of lots

==== Results ====
| March 3 Round 1 | San Jose Earthquakes | 3–2 | Minnesota United FC | San Jose, California |
| 19:15 PST | Hoesen 27', 59'; Vako 28'; Ockford (yellow card) 71' | Report | Mears (yellow card) 25'; Molino 81', 85' | Stadium: Avaya Stadium; Attendance: 18,000; Referee: Baldomero Toledo |

| March 17 Round 2 | Sporting Kansas City | 3–2 | San Jose Earthquakes | Kansas City, Kansas |
| 17:30 PST | Sallói (yellow card) 21'; Sánchez 25' (pen.); Zusi 56'; Gutiérrez 68' | Report | Vako 34'; Quintana (yellow card) 39'; Wondolowski 90+1' | Stadium: Children's Mercy Park; Attendance: 18,868; Referee: Allen Chapman |

| March 31 Round 3 | San Jose Earthquakes | 1–2 | New York City FC | San Jose, California |
| 16:45 PST | Quintana 3'; Godoy (yellow card) 29' | Report | Ofori (yellow card) 41'; Tinnerholm 49', (yellow card) 89'; Moralez 60', (yellow card) 90+2'; Callens (yellow card) 67'; Herrera (yellow card) 74' | Stadium: Avaya Stadium; Attendance: 18,000 |

| April 7 Round 4 | Philadelphia Union | 1–1 | San Jose Earthquakes | Chester, Pennsylvania |
| 16:00 PST | Accam (yellow card) 23'; Bedoya 64' | Report | Eriksson 37'; Quintana (yellow card) 56'; Wondolowski (yellow card) 82'; Cummings (red card) 90+6' | Stadium: Talen Energy Stadium; Attendance: 14,795 |

| April 14 Round 5 | San Jose Earthquakes | 2–2 | Houston Dynamo | San Jose, California |
| 19:15 PST | Eriksson 26'; Affolter (yellow card) 31'; Wondolowski (yellow card) 71'; Hyka 85' | Report | Martínez (yellow card) 36', (goal) 48'; Manotas 63'; Elis (yellow card) 65'; Machado (yellow card) 87'; Cerén (yellow card) 90+2' | Stadium: Avaya Stadium; Attendance: 17,822 |

| April 21 Round 6 | Orlando City SC | 3–2 | San Jose Earthquakes | Orlando, Florida |
| 16:30 PST | Mueller 2'; Kljestan 35'; Dwyer 69'; Yotún (yellow card) 65' | Report | Jungwirth 78', 90'; Quintana (yellow card) 73' | Stadium: Orlando City Stadium; Attendance: 25,527; Referee: Ismail Elfath |

| April 28 Round 7 | Columbus Crew | 2–1 | San Jose Earthquakes | Columbus, Ohio |
| 16:30 PST | Harrison 28'; Hansen (yellow card) 36'; Valenzuela (yellow card) 67'; Grella 84' | Report | Godoy (yellow card) 3'; Hoesen 45', (yellow card) 72'; Jungwirth (yellow card) 66' | Stadium: MAPFRE Stadium; Attendance: 11,479; Referee: Fotis Bazakos |

| May 5 Round 8 | San Jose Earthquakes | 0–1 | Portland Timbers | San Jose, California |
| 19:15 PST | Godoy (yellow card) 69'; Amarikwa (yellow card) 90+7' | Report | Paredes (yellow card) 45+1'; Chara (yellow card) 53'; Mabiala (yellow card) 77'; Valeri 88'; Ridgewell (yellow card) 90+3'; Polo (yellow card) 90+4' | Stadium: Avaya Stadium; Attendance: 17,850; Referee: Chris Penso |

| May 12 Round 9 | Minnesota United FC | 1–3 | San Jose Earthquakes | Minneapolis, Minnesota |
| 11:00 PST | Rasmus Schuller (yellow card) 21'; Christian Ramirez 26'; Francisco Calvo (yellow card) 73' | Report | Magnus Eriksson 2' (pen.); Harold Cummings (yellow card) 40'; Salinas (yellow card) 63'; Danny Hoesen 69'; Chris Wondolowski 76' (pen.); Andrew Tarbell (yellow card) 90+3' | Stadium: TCF Bank Stadium; Attendance: 19,721; Referee: Victor Rivas |

| May 16 Round 10 | Vancouver Whitecaps FC | 2–2 | San Jose Earthquakes | Vancouver, British Columbia |
| 19:30 PST | Techera 19'; Reyna 64' | Report | Hoesen 19'; Lima 53'; Godoy (yellow card) 73'; Jungwirth (yellow card) 73' | Stadium: BC Place; Attendance: 17,357; Referee: Armando Villarreal |

| May 19 Round 11 | San Jose Earthquakes | 1–3 | D.C. United | San Jose, California |
| 19:15 PST | Hoesen 43'; Jungwirth (yellow card) 90' | Report | Stieber 15'; Mattocks 20'; Asad 37'; Durkin (yellow card) 60' | Stadium: Avaya Stadium; Attendance: 17,644; Referee: Baldomero Toledo |

| May 25 Round 12 | LA Galaxy | 1–0 | San Jose Earthquakes | Carson, California |
| 20:00 PST | Alessandrini 82'; Kamara (yellow card) 85' | Report | | Stadium: StubHub Center; Attendance: 23,118; Referee: Kevin Stott |

| June 2 Round 13 | Chicago Fire | 2–1 | San Jose Earthquakes | Bridgeview, Illinois |
| 12:00 PST | Alan Gordon 29'; Aleksandar Katai 49'; Jorge Luis Corrales (yellow card) 57' | Report | Fatai Alashe (yellow card) 45+5'; Jimmy Ockford (yellow card) 61'; Danny Hoesen 74' | Stadium: Toyota Park; Attendance: 14,138; Referee: Ismail Elfath |

| June 9 Round 14 | San Jose Earthquakes | 3–4 | Los Angeles FC | San Jose, California |
| 19:15 PST | Qazaishvili 11'; Partida (yellow card) 22' (yellow-red card) 90+6'; Wondolowski 52', 63' | Report | Diomande 15', 90'; Beitashour 19'; Zimmerman (yellow card) 26'; Moutinho 90+7', (yellow card) 90+8' | Stadium: Avaya Stadium; Attendance: 17,650; Referee: Grajeda |

| June 13 Round 15 | San Jose Earthquakes | 2–2 | New England Revolution | San Jose, California |
| 19:15 PST | Hoesen 17' (Jungwirth) 51' (Lima) | Report | Fagundez 31'; Penilla 43' (Fagundez) | Stadium: Avaya Stadium; Attendance: 16,234; Referee: David Gantar |

| June 23 Round 16 | Real Salt Lake | 1–1 | San Jose Earthquakes | Sandy, Utah |
| 19:00 PST | Kreilach (yellow card) 12', (goal) 54' | Report | Hoesen 64' | Stadium: Rio Tinto Stadium; Attendance: 18,472; Referee: Silviu Petrescu |

| June 30 Round 17 | San Jose Earthquakes | 3–3 | LA Galaxy | Stanford, California |
| 19:00 PST | Wondolowski 15', 69' (pen.); Qazaishvili 39'; Ockford (yellow card) 48' | Report | Ibrahimović 1' (Pontius), 25', (yellow card) 90'; Alessandrini 20', (yellow card) 82'; Jamieson (yellow card) 78' | Stadium: Stanford Stadium; Attendance: 50,743; Referee: José Carlos Rivero |

| July 7 Round 18 | Portland Timbers | 2–1 | San Jose Earthquakes | Portland, Oregon |
| 20:00 PST | Armenteros 14' (Valeri); Chara (yellow card) 46'; Armenteros; Asprilla (yellow card) 55' | Report | Cummings (yellow card) 1'; Jungwirth 87' (Amarikwa) | Stadium: Providence Park; Attendance: 21,144; Referee: Ted Unkel |

| July 14 Round 19 | Montreal Impact | 2–0 | San Jose Earthquakes | Montreal, Quebec |
| 16:30 PST | Taïder 8'; Krolicki (yellow card) 37'; Piatti 74'; Silva (yellow card) 85' | Report | Godoy (yellow card) 26'; Lima (yellow card) 59'; Wondolowski (yellow card) 90' | Stadium: Stade Saputo; Attendance: 15,485; Referee: Joseph Dickerson |

| July 25 Round 20 | San Jose Earthquakes | 0–1 | Seattle Sounders FC | San Jose, California |
| 19:15 PST | Luis Felipe (yellow card) 38' | Preview | Ruidíaz 62' | Stadium: Avaya Stadium; Attendance: 16,478; Referee: Kevin Stott |

| July 28 Round 21 | San Jose Earthquakes | 0–0 | Real Salt Lake | San Jose, California |
| 19:15 PST | Salinas (yellow card) 67'; Luis Felipe (yellow card) 72' | Report | M. Silva (yellow card) 43'; Glad (yellow card) 45+2'; Lennon (yellow card) 85' | Stadium: Avaya Stadium; Attendance: 16,351; Referee: Marcos de Oliveira |

| August 4 Round 22 | FC Dallas | 1–3 | San Jose Earthquakes | Frisco, Texas |
| 17:00 PST | Lamah 23' | Report | Qazaishvili 19', 88'; Hyka 47'; Kashia (yellow card) 74' | Stadium: Toyota Stadium; Attendance: 17,282; Referee: David Gantar |

| August 11 Round 23 | Colorado Rapids | 2–1 | San Jose Earthquakes | Commerce City, Colorado |
| 18:00 PST | Smith 24'; McBean (yellow card) 44'; Ford (yellow card) 69'; Serna (yellow card) 89'; Boateng 90+3' | Report | Eriksson 58' (pen.); Luis Felipe (yellow card) 87'; Salinas (red card) 88'; Cummings (yellow card) 89' | Stadium: Dick's Sporting Goods Park; Attendance: 15,383; Referee: Alan Kelly |

| August 18 Round 24 | San Jose Earthquakes | 1–1 | Toronto FC | San Jose, California |
| 19:00 PST | Wondolowski 77'; Kashia (yellow card) 52' | Report | Janson | Stadium: Avaya Stadium; Attendance: 17,456; Referee: Silviu Petrescu |

| August 25 Round 25 | San Jose Earthquakes | 2–3 | Vancouver Whitecaps FC | San Jose, California |
| 18:45 PST | Hyka 7'; Eriksson 18' (pen.); Godoy (yellow card) 30' | Report | Reyna (yellow card) 51' (goal) 59'; Felipe (yellow card) 52' de Jong (yellow card) 52'; Techera 61'; Kamara 68' | Stadium: Avaya Stadium; Attendance: 16,326; Referee: Baldomero Toledo |

| August 29 Round 26 | San Jose Earthquakes | 4–3 | FC Dallas | San Jose, California |
| 19:15 PST | Qazaishvili 16', 42'; Eriksson 54'; Wondolowski 62' | Report | Urruti 8'; Mosquera 51'; Badji 58' | Stadium: Avaya Stadium; Attendance: 15,648; Referee: Sorin Stoica |

| September 1 Round 27 | Vancouver Whitecaps FC | 2–1 | San Jose Earthquakes | Vancouver, British Columbia |
| 19:00 PST | Davies 22'; Techera (yellow card) 63'; Reyna (yellow card) 67'; Mezquida 78' | Report | Lima (yellow card) 42'; Eriksson (yellow card) 83'; Qazaishvili 90+1' | Stadium: BC Place; Attendance: 22,120; Referee: Mark Geiger |

| September 15 Round 28 | San Jose Earthquakes | 1–5 | Sporting Kansas City | San Jose, California |
| 19:15 PST | Godoy (yellow card) 50'; Eriksson (yellow card) 57'; Hossen 80' | Report | Gutiérrez 18'; Fernandes 23', 86'; Opara 42'; Németh 67' | Stadium: Avaya Stadium; Attendance: 16,682; Referee: Dave Gantar |

| September 19 Round 29 | San Jose Earthquakes | 3–4 | Atlanta United FC | San Jose, California |
| 19:15 PST | Lima 13'; Hoesen 43'; Salinas (yellow card) 53'; Qazaishvili 58' | Report | Escobar (yellow card) 7'; Larentowicz (yellow card) 18'; Villalba 45+3'; Martínez 70' (pen.), 90+5'; Almirón 73' | Stadium: Avaya Stadium; Attendance: 15,948; Referee: Fotis Bazakos |

| September 22 Round 30 | Los Angeles FC | 2–0 | San Jose Earthquakes | Los Angeles, California |
| 12:30 PST | Zimmerman 41', 68' | Report | Jungwirth (yellow card) 43'; Godoy (yellow card) 52' | Stadium: Banc of California Stadium; Attendance: 22,000; Referee: Robert Sibiga |

| September 29 Round 31 | Houston Dynamo | 3–2 | San Jose Earthquakes | Houston, Texas |
| 17:30 PST | Manotas 56'; Martínez (yellow card) 52', (goal) 68'; Quioto 87' | Report | Kashia (yellow card) 11'; Wondolowski 37' (pen.); Fuenmayor 45' (o.g.) | Stadium: BBVA Compass Stadium; Attendance: 17,136; Referee: Hilario Grajeda |

| October 6 Round 32 | San Jose Earthquakes | 1–3 | New York Red Bulls | San Jose, California |
| 19:15 PST | Wondolowski 83' | Report | Muyl 29'; Wright-Phillips 32'; Long 50'; Cásseres (yellow card) 80' | Stadium: Avaya Stadium; Attendance: 17,241; Referee: Baldomero Toledo |

| October 21 Round 33 | San Jose Earthquakes | 0–0 | Colorado Rapids | San Jose, California |
| 14:00 PDT | Boateng (yellow card) 51'; Ford (yellow card) 77' | Report | | Stadium: Avaya Stadium; Attendance: 17,474; Referee: Timothy Ford |

| October 28 Round 34 | Seattle Sounders FC | 2–1 | San Jose Earthquakes | Seattle, Washington |
| 13:30 PST | Ruidíaz 79', 90+3', (yellow card) 90+4' | Report | Cavillo (yellow card) 53'; Marshall 64' (o.g.) | Stadium: CenturyLink Field; Attendance: 42,617; Referee: Hilario Grajeda |

=== U.S. Open Cup ===
The Earthquakes and all other MLS clubs join the U.S. Open Cup in round 4.

Win Draw Loss Upcoming fixture

| June 6, 2018 Fourth Round | Portland Timbers | 2–0 | San Jose Earthquakes | Portland, Oregon |
| 19:30 PST | Ebobisse 28'; Asprilla 66' (Chara) | Report | Alashe (yellow card) 41'; Ockford (yellow card) 54' | Stadium: Providence Park; Attendance: 12,769; Referee: Farhad Dadkho |

== Player statistics ==
=== Scoring leaders ===
| Place | Position | Number | Name | MLS | MLS Cup | Open Cup | Total |
|---|---|---|---|---|---|---|---|
| 1 | FW | 9 | (Netherlands) Danny Hoesen | 2 | 0 | 0 | 2 |
| 1 | MF | 11 | (Georgia (country)) Vako | 2 | 0 | 0 | 2 |
| 1 | MF | 7 | (Sweden) Magnus Eriksson | 2 | 0 | 0 | 2 |
| 3 | FW | 8 | (United States) Chris Wondolowski | 1 | 0 | 0 | 1 |
| 3 | DF | 30 | (Uruguay) Yeferson Quintana | 1 | 0 | 0 | 1 |
| 3 | MF | 10 | (Albania) Jahmir Hyka | 1 | 0 | 0 | 1 |

=== Assist leaders ===
| Place | Position | Number | Name | MLS | MLS Cup | Open Cup | Total |
|---|---|---|---|---|---|---|---|
| 1 | MF | 11 | (Georgia (country)) Vako | 2 | 0 | 0 | 2 |
| 1 | MF | 7 | (Sweden) Magnus Eriksson | 2 | 0 | 0 | 2 |
| 3 | FW | 8 | (United States) Chris Wondolowski | 1 | 0 | 0 | 1 |
| 3 | FW | 9 | (Netherlands) Danny Hoesen | 1 | 0 | 0 | 1 |
| 3 | MF | 14 | (United States) Jackson Yueill | 1 | 0 | 0 | 1 |
| 3 | FW | 25 | (United States) Quincy Amarikwa | 1 | 0 | 0 | 1 |

== Player Awards ==
=== League ===
| Player | Award | Date | Ref |
|---|---|---|---|
| Danny Hoesen | Audi Player Index Performance of the Week | 03/05/18 | |
| Danny Hoesen | MLS Team of the Week | 03/05/18 | |
| Vako | MLS Team of the Week (bench) | 03/05/18 | |
| Danny Hoesen | Alcatel MLS Player of the Week | 03/06/18 | |

== Player movement ==
=== In ===
Per Major League Soccer and club policies terms of the deals do not get disclosed.

| Date | Player | Position | Previous club | Notes | Ref |
|---|---|---|---|---|---|
| 12/01/17 | (Colombia) Joel Qwiberg | Defender | (Sweden) IF Brommapojkarna | Undisclosed | |
| 12/06/17 | (United States) JT Marcinkowski | Goalkeeper | (United States) Georgetown Hoyas | Homegrown Player | |
| 12/14/17 | (United States) Luis Felipe | Midfielder | (United States) Reno 1868 | Free | |
| 12/14/17 | (United States) Chris Wehan | Midfielder | (United States) Reno 1868 | Free | |
| 12/14/17 | (United States) Jimmy Ockford | Defender | (United States) Reno 1868 | Free | |
| 12/15/17 | (United States) Jacob Akanyirige | Defender | (United States) San Jose Earthquakes Academy | Homegrown Player | |
| 12/20/17 | (Sweden) Magnus Eriksson | Midfielder | (Sweden) Djurgårdens IF | Designated Player | |
| 12/29/17 | (Netherlands) Danny Hoesen | Forward | (Netherlands) FC Groningen | Targeted Allocation Money | |
| 01/20/18 | (United States) Eric Calvillo | Midfielder | (United States) New York Cosmos | Undisclosed | |
| 01/26/18 | (United States) Gilbert Fuentes | Midfielder | (United States) San Jose Earthquakes Academy | Homegrown Player | |
| 03/01/18 | (United States) Danny Musovski | Forward | (United States) UNLV Rebels | MLS SuperDraft | |
| 03/01/18 | (United States) Mohamed Thiaw | Forward | (United States) Louisville Cardinals | MLS SuperDraft | |
| 03/16/18 | (France) Paul Marie | Defender | (United States) FIU Panthers | MLS SuperDraft | |

=== Out ===
| Date | Player | Position | Destination Club | Notes | Ref |
|---|---|---|---|---|---|
| 11/27/17 | (Honduras) Víctor Bernárdez | Defender | | Option Declined | |
| 11/27/17 | (New Zealand) Kip Colvey | Defender | (United States) Colorado Rapids | Option Declined; Selected in 2017 Waiver Draft | |
| 11/27/17 | (Trinidad and Tobago) Cordell Cato | Defender | (United States) Charlotte Independence | Option Declined; Signed by Charlotte Independence | |
| 11/27/17 | (South Africa) Lindo Mfeka | Midfielder | (United States) Reno 1868 | Option Declined; Signed by Reno 1868 | |
| 11/27/17 | (United States) Marc Pelosi | Midfielder | | Option Declined | |
| 11/27/17 | (Brazil) Matheus Silva | Defender | (United States) Swope Park Rangers | Option Declined; Signed by Swope Park Rangers | |
| 11/27/17 | (Netherlands) Danny Hoesen | Forward | (Netherlands) FC Groningen | Option Declined | |
| 11/27/17 | (United States) David Bingham | Goalkeeper | (United States) LA Galaxy | Out of contract; MLS rights traded to LA Galaxy | |
| 11/27/17 | (Argentina) Andrés Imperiale | Defender | (Paraguay) Club Guaraní | Out of contract | |
| 11/27/17 | (United States) Kofi Sarkodie | Defender | | Out of contract | |
| 12/12/17 | (Costa Rica) Marco Ureña | Forward | (United States) Los Angeles FC | Selected in 2017 MLS Expansion Draft | |
| 01/19/18 | (El Salvador) Darwin Cerén | Midfielder | (United States) Houston Dynamo | Traded for allocation money | |
| 02/16/18 | (Jamaica) Simon Dawkins | Midfielder | | Contract bought out | |

=== Loans ===
==== In ====
| Date | Player | Position | Loaned from | Notes | Ref |
|---|---|---|---|---|---|
| 01/17/18 | (Uruguay) Yeferson Quintana | Defender | (Uruguay) Peñarol | Season-long loan | |

==== Out ====
| Date | Player | Position | Loaned to | Notes | Ref |
|---|---|---|---|---|---|
| 03/01/18 | (United States) Danny Musovski | Forward | (United States) Reno 1868 | | |
| 03/01/18 | (United States) Mohamed Thiaw | Forward | (United States) Reno 1868 | | |
| 03/16/18 | (France) Paul Marie | Defender | (United States) Reno 1868 | | |

=== Draft picks ===
| Date | Player | Position | Previous club | Notes | Ref |
|---|---|---|---|---|---|
| 01/19/18 | (United States) Paul Marie | Defender | (United States) FIU Panthers | MLS SuperDraft 1st Round Pick (#12) | |
| 01/19/18 | (United States) Danny Musovski | Forward | (United States) UNLV Rebels | MLS SuperDraft 2nd Round Pick (#7) | |
| 01/19/18 | (United States) Mohamed Thiaw | Forward | (United States) Louisville Cardinals | MLS SuperDraft 2nd Round Pick (#12) | |
| 01/21/18 | (United States) Kevin Partida | Midfielder | (United States) UNLV Rebels | MLS SuperDraft 3rd Round Pick (#48 overall) | |
