= Valeri Qazaishvili =

Georgian footballer (born 1993)

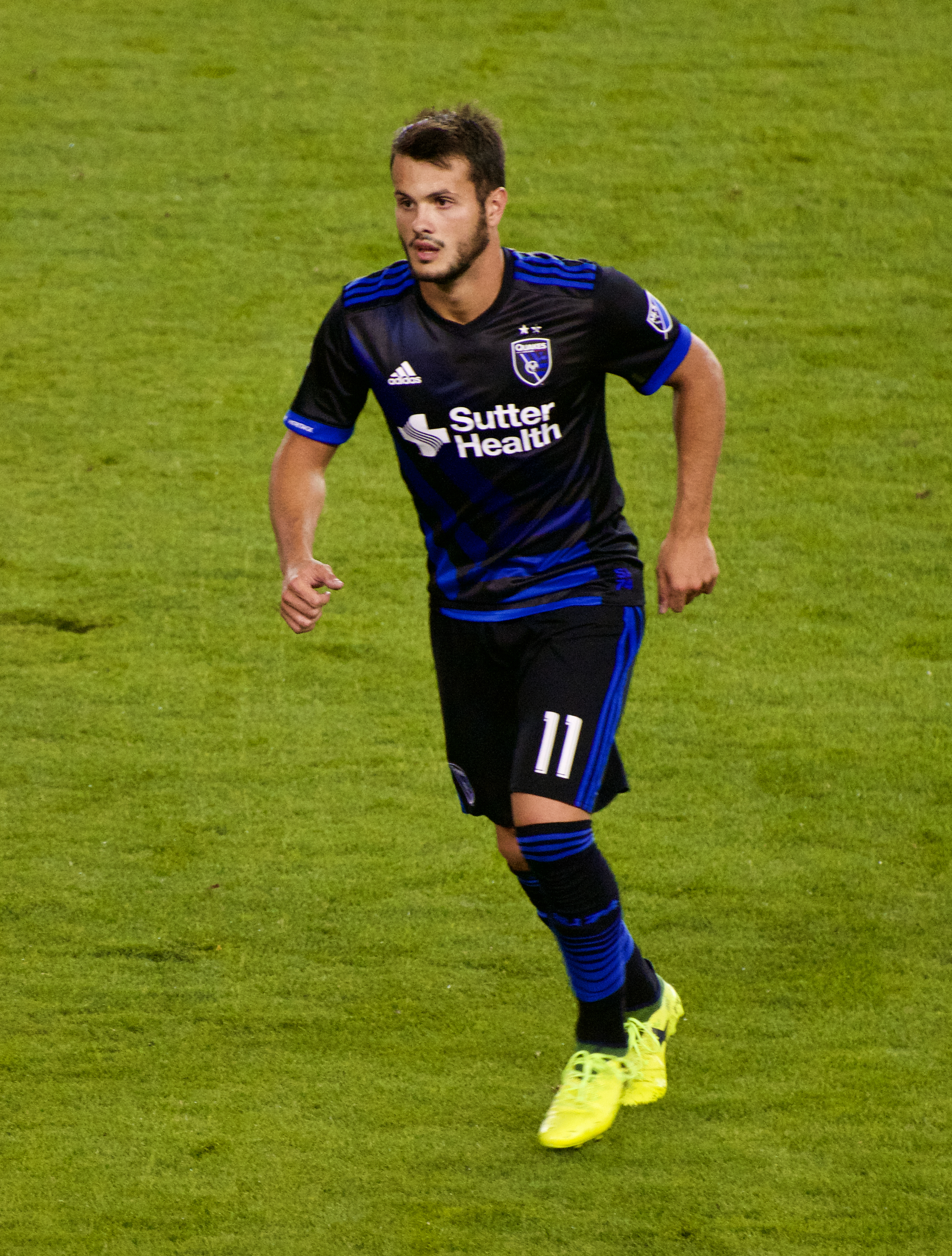
- Qazaishvili playing for San Jose in 2017

Personal information
- Date of birth: 29 January 1993 (age 33)
- Place of birth: Ozurgeti, Georgia
- Height: 1.74 m (5 ft 9 in)
- Position: Attacking midfielder

Team information
- Current team: Shandong Taishan
- Number: 10

Youth career
- –2010: Saburtalo Tbilisi

Senior career*
Years	Team	Apps	(Gls)
2010–2011	Saburtalo Tbilisi	0	(0)
2010–2011	→ Metalurgi Rustavi (loan)	9	(1)
2011	→ Sioni (loan)	0	(0)
2011–2017	Vitesse	106	(26)
2016–2017	→ Legia Warsaw (loan)	12	(1)
2017–2020	San Jose Earthquakes	96	(27)
2021–2023	Ulsan Hyundai	106	(28)
2024–	Shandong Taishan	89	(44)

International career^{‡}
2009–2010	Georgia U17	6	(3)
2010–2011	Georgia U19	6	(2)
2011–2013	Georgia U21	11	(4)
2014–2022	Georgia	62	(13)
- * Club domestic league appearances and goals as of 8 November 2026 ‡ National team caps and goals as of 6 June 2022

Valeri "Vako" Qazaishvili (born 29 January 1993) is a Georgian professional footballer who plays as an attacking midfielder for Chinese Super League club Shandong Taishan and the Georgia national team.

Qazaishvili began his career in his native country before moving to Eredivisie side Vitesse in 2011. He spent the 2016–17 season on loan at Legia Warsaw, where he won the Ekstraklasa and played in the UEFA Champions League. He then joined the San Jose Earthquakes of Major League Soccer, where he spent four seasons.

He made his debut for Georgia's national team in 2014.

== Club career ==
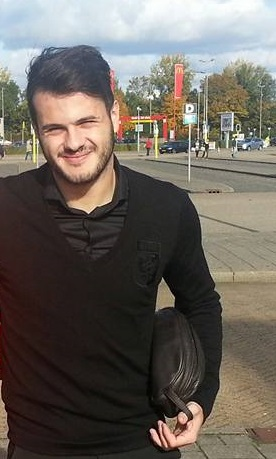
Qazaishvili in 2016

=== Vitesse ===
Starting his footballing career in his native country, Georgia. Qazaishvili made several appearances for Metalurgi Rustavi and Sioni whilst on loan from Saburtalo Tbilisi before joining Dutch side Vitesse in 2011. After impressing with the Vitesse youth sides, Qazaishvili was given his debut on 27 November 2011, in a 0–0 draw with Twente, starting the fixture before being replaced by Georgian teammate Giorgi Chanturia in the 65th minute. A week later, he scored his first Vitesse goal in a 4–0 victory over RKC Waalwijk, netting in the 21st minute to make it 2–0. In the later years of Qazaishvili's spell with Vitesse, he became a key figure, especially in their 2014–15 and 2015–16 campaigns, netting nineteen times between the two.

==== Legia Warsaw (loan) ====
On 31 August 2016, Qazaishvili joined Polish side Legia Warsaw on a season-long loan. On 14 September 2016, he made his Legia Warsaw debut in a 6–0 home defeat against Borussia Dortmund in the opening matchday of the 2016–17 UEFA Champions League. On 1 October 2016, he made his league debut for Legia Warsaw in a 3–0 victory over Lechia Gdańsk, replacing Guilherme in the 76th minute. On 14 May 2017, Qazaishvili scored his first and only goal for Legia Warsaw in their 6–0 home victory over Nieciecza, coming off the bench to seal the win, netting in the 88th minute.

Following the conclusion of the 2016–17 campaign, Qazaishvili returned to Vitesse after appearing sixteen times and scoring once (in all competitions) for Legia Warsaw. After leaving Legia, he stated that he was disappointed with the loan and with Legia coach Jacek Magiera, who Qazaishvili said told him from the very beginning of the loan that he did not have a place with the team. However, he was pleased to have the opportunity to play in the Champions League and alongside players like Nemanja Nikolić, who he would later compete against in MLS.

=== San Jose Earthquakes ===
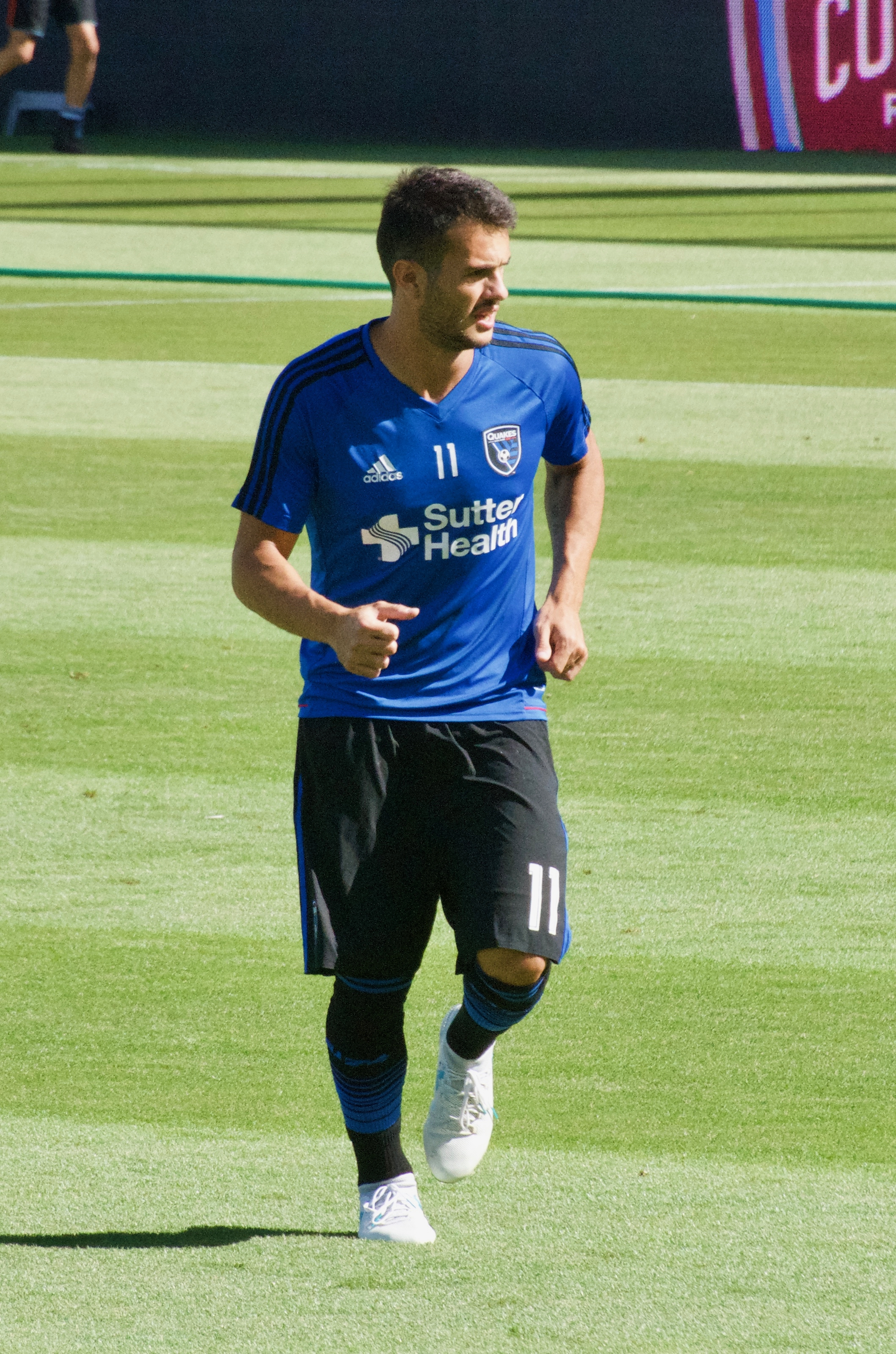
Qazaishvili warming up for San Jose against the Colorado Rapids at Avaya Stadium on 29 July 2017

On 22 June 2017, Qazaishvili joined American side San Jose Earthquakes as a Designated Player, the team's youngest ever, after a six-year spell with Vitesse. He was introduced at the club on 10 July 2017, by General Manager Jesse Fioranelli during halftime of San Jose's U.S. Open Cup quarterfinal victory over the LA Galaxy; Georgian basketball player Zaza Pachulia, who was playing for the Golden State Warriors at the time, was present at the ceremony as well. His club debut came in a friendly match four days later on 14 July as a 63rd minute substitution in San Jose's 4–1 defeat of Eintracht Frankfurt. Qazaishvili scored in his MLS debut on 19 July, coming on as a halftime substitution for Danny Hoesen against the New York Red Bulls at Red Bull Arena and scoring San Jose's lone goal of the 5–1 defeat in the 88th minute off of a cross by Jahmir Hyka. He first started for the Earthquakes on 9 August during the team's U.S. Open Cup semifinal loss against Sporting Kansas City, earning an assist on Hoesen's goal and converting his penalty when the game was settled with a penalty shootout. During his first MLS start, at home against the Philadelphia Union on 19 August, Qazaishvili scored his second league goal, assisted by Tommy Thompson.

San Jose declined Qazaishvili's contract option following their 2020 season.

=== Ulsan Hyundai ===
On 16 February 2021, Qazaishvili signed with K League 1 side Ulsan Hyundai.

=== Shandong Taishan ===
On 26 January 2024, Qazaishvili joined Chinese Super League club Shandong Taishan.

== International career ==
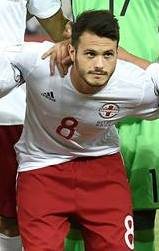
Qazaishvili with the Georgian national team in 2016.

Qazaishvili has represented Georgia at under-17, under-19 and under-21 levels before making his senior debut in 2014 in 2–0 victory over Liechtenstein, in which he replaced Avtandil Ebralidze at half-time.

Qazaishvili became a regular with the senior squad, and was a part of Georgia's unsuccessful 2018 FIFA World Cup qualification run in 2017. He scored in Georgia's 2–2 draw with Moldova on 11 June, keeping qualification hopes alive, and again in Georgia's 1–1 tie with Ireland on 2 September. He played in the remaining qualifying matches as well, against Austria, Wales, and Serbia, but Georgia ultimately failed to qualify for the 2018 FIFA World Cup.

== Personal life ==
Qazaishvili was born in Ozurgeti, but grew up in the Vake-Saburtalo District of Tbilisi, the Georgian capital. His mother is a Georgian teacher, and his father is a factory engineer; he has a younger brother, Beka, who is eighteen months younger than him. In 2011, Qazaishvili married his wife Gvantsa, whom he met growing up in Saburtalo, and their daughter Emilia was born in 2015. He received his U.S. green card in January 2019, which qualifies him as a domestic player for MLS roster purposes.

Qazaishvili is close friends with Georgia national teammate Guram Kashia, whom he met playing for Vitesse and who joined him in San Jose in 2018. He said of his move to the Netherlands as a teenager that his friendships with Kashia and fellow Georgian teammate at Vitesse Giorgi Chanturia, whom he knew and had played football with from his childhood, helped what was otherwise a difficult move to a new country at a young age.

Qazaishvili is a fan of and influenced by Argentine footballer Lionel Messi and Italian footballer Alessandro del Piero.

== Career statistics ==
=== Club ===
As of matches played 8 November 2026

Appearances and goals by club, season and competition
Club	Season	League			National cup (Note: Includes Georgian Cup, KNVB Cup, Polish Cup, U.S. Open Cup, Korean FA Cup)		Continental		Other		Total	
Club	Season	Division	Apps	Goals	Apps	Goals	Apps	Goals	Apps	Goals	Apps	Goals
Metalurgi Rustavi	2009–10	Umaglesi Liga	2	0	0	0	—		—		2	0
Metalurgi Rustavi	2010–11	Umaglesi Liga	7	1	1	0	—		1 (Note: SUC)	0	9	1
Metalurgi Rustavi	Total		9	1	1	0	—		1	0	11	1
Vitesse	2011–12	Eredivisie	4	1	0	0	—		0	0	4	1
Vitesse	2012–13	Eredivisie	5	0	1	0	0	0	—		6	0
Vitesse	2013–14	Eredivisie	26	4	3	0	2 (Note: Appearances in UEFA Europa League)	0	1 (Note: Appearance(s) in Eredivisie European play-offs)	0	32	4
Vitesse	2014–15	Eredivisie	33	9	3	1	—		4	2	40	12
Vitesse	2015–16	Eredivisie	33	10	1	0	2	0	—		36	10
Vitesse	2016–17	Eredivisie	3	1	0	0	—		—		3	1
Vitesse	Total		104	25	8	1	4	0	5	2	121	28
Legia Warsaw (loan)	2016–17	Ekstraklasa	12	1	0	0	4 (Note: Two appearances in UEFA Champions League, two appearances in UEFA Europa League)	0	—		16	1
San Jose Earthquakes	2017	Major League Soccer	13	5	1	0	—		1 (Note: Appearance in MLS Cup Playoffs)	0	15	5
San Jose Earthquakes	2018	Major League Soccer	33	10	0	0	—		—		33	10
San Jose Earthquakes	2019	Major League Soccer	32	8	2	3	—		—		34	11
San Jose Earthquakes	2020	Major League Soccer	15	3	—		—		5 (Note: Appearances in MLS is Back Tournament)	1	20	4
San Jose Earthquakes	Total		93	26	3	3	—		6	1	102	30
Ulsan Hyundai	2021	K League 1	34	9	2	1	8 (Note: Appearances in AFC Champions League)	4	—		44	14
Ulsan Hyundai	2022	K League 1	37	8	2	0	7	2	—		46	10
Ulsan Hyundai	2023	K League 1	35	11	2	0	5	0	—		42	11
Ulsan Hyundai	Total		106	28	6	1	20	6	—		132	35
Shandong Taishan	2024	Chinese Super League	29	7	5	2	11	3	—		45	12
Shandong Taishan	2025	Chinese Super League	30	27	1	0	1	1	—		32	28
Shandong Taishan	2026	Chinese Super League	30	10	3	0	—		—		33	10
Shandong Taishan	Total		89	44	9	2	12	4	—		110	50
Career total			413	125	27	7	39	10	13	3	492	145

=== International ===
As of 29 March 2022

Appearances and goals by national team and year
National team	Year	Apps	Goals
Georgia	2014	4	0
Georgia	2015	9	3
Georgia	2016	8	1
Georgia	2017	10	2
Georgia	2018	8	4
Georgia	2019	8	0
Georgia	2020	6	1
Georgia	2021	3	0
Georgia	2022	2	0
Total		58	11

Scores and results list Georgia's goal tally first, score column indicates score after each Qazaishvili goal.

List of international goals scored by Valeri Qazaishvili
No.	Date	Venue	Opponent	Score	Result	Competition
1	25 March 2015	Mikheil Meskhi Stadium, Tbilisi, Georgia	Malta	2–0	2–0	Friendly
2	4 September 2015	Boris Paichadze Stadium, Tbilisi, Georgia	Scotland	1–0	1–0	UEFA Euro 2016 qualification
3	8 October 2015	Boris Paichadze Stadium, Tbilisi, Georgia	Gibraltar	4–0	4–0	UEFA Euro 2016 qualification
4	12 November 2016	Boris Paichadze Stadium, Tbilisi, Georgia	Moldova	1–0	1–1	2018 FIFA World Cup qualification
5	11 June 2017	Zimbru Stadium, Chișinău, Moldova	Moldova	2–2	2–2	2018 FIFA World Cup qualification
6	2 September 2017	Boris Paichadze Stadium, Tbilisi, Georgia	Republic of Ireland	1–1	1–1	2018 FIFA World Cup qualification
7	24 March 2018	Mikheil Meskhi Stadium, Tbilisi, Georgia	Lithuania	3–0	4–0	Friendly
8	27 March 2018	Mikheil Meskhi Stadium, Tbilisi, Georgia	Estonia	2–0	2–0	Friendly
9	13 October 2018	Boris Paichadze Stadium, Tbilisi, Georgia	Andorra	1–0	3–0	2018–19 UEFA Nations League D
10	13 October 2018	Boris Paichadze Stadium, Tbilisi, Georgia	Andorra	2–0	3–0	2018–19 UEFA Nations League D
11	15 November 2020	Boris Paichadze Stadium, Tbilisi, Georgia	Armenia	1–1	1–2	2020–21 UEFA Nations League C
12	2 June 2022	Boris Paichadze Stadium, Tbilisi, Georgia	Gibraltar	4–0	4–0	2022–23 UEFA Nations League C
13	5 June 2022	Huvepharma Arena, Razgrad, Bulgaria	Bulgaria	5–1	5–2	2022–23 UEFA Nations League C

== Honours ==
Legia Warsaw

- Ekstraklasa: 2016–17

Ulsan Hyundai

- K League 1: 2022, 2023

Individual

- MLS Fair Play Award: 2018
- K League 1 Best XI: 2021
- K League 1 Player of the Month: 2023 June
