= Jahmir Hyka =

Albanian footballer (born 1988)

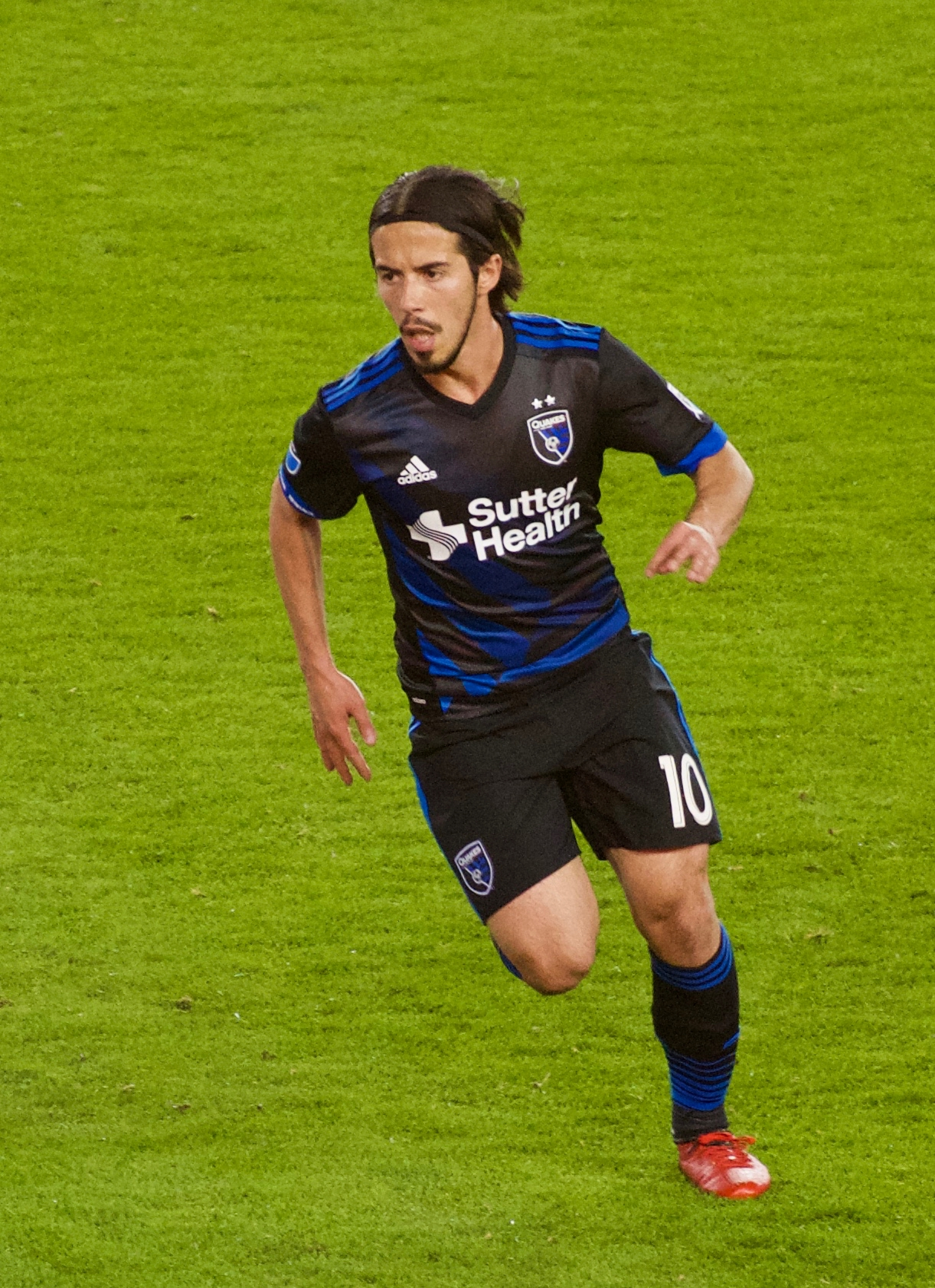
- Hyka playing for San Jose Earthquakes in 2018

Personal information
- Date of birth: 8 March 1988 (age 38)
- Place of birth: Tirana, Albania
- Height: 1.69 m (5 ft 7 in)
- Position: Left midfielder

Youth career
- 2000–2005: Dinamo Tirana
- 2005–2006: → Rosenborg (loan)

Senior career*
Years	Team	Apps	(Gls)
2006	→ Rosenborg (loan)	0	(0)
2007–2008	Olympiacos	0	(0)
2007–2008	→ Tirana (loan)	32	(2)
2008–2010	Mainz 05	15	(0)
2010–2011	Panionios	9	(0)
2011	Tirana	11	(4)
2011–2017	Luzern	161	(17)
2017–2018	San Jose Earthquakes	49	(6)
2019–2020	Maccabi Netanya	31	(3)
2020	Sektzia Ness Ziona	11	(1)
2020–2021	Guizhou Hengfeng	11	(2)
2022	KF Teuta	9	(0)
Total		339	(35)

International career
2005–2006	Albania U17	3	(1)
2005–2006	Albania U19	6	(1)
2007–2009	Albania U21	7	(1)
2007–2018	Albania	47	(2)
- * Club domestic league appearances and goals

Jahmir Hyka (born 8 March 1988) is an Albanian retired professional footballer who played as a left midfielder.

A Dinamo Tirana product, Hyka started his professional career in Norway at Rosenborg where did not make a league appearance. He moved to Greek club Olympiacos in 2007, again failing to make a league appearance and who then sent him on loan to Tirana. Hyka's performances at Tirana earned him a move to Mainz 05 of the 2. Bundesliga in 2008 where he made his German top flight debut in 2009. He played for Panionios in the first half of 2010–11 before returning to Tirana in January 2011 and helping KF Tirana to clinch the Albanian Cup. In the summer of 2011, he left Albania again to join Luzern in Switzerland, where he made more than 150 appearances in six years. In February 2017, he signed with San Jose Earthquakes in Major League Soccer.

In January 2019 Jahmir Hyka signed with Maccabi Netanya a contract for 1.5 years.

Hyka represented Albania at youth levels, playing for the under-17, under-19 and under-21 levels. He made his senior debut in 2007 and one year later scored Albania's fastest goal in history. Since then, he has collected 44 caps as of June 2017.

== Club career ==
=== Early career and Norway ===
Hyka joined local side Dinamo Tirana at the age of 12, where he played for the youth teams for four years, until he made it to the first team at 2004. He was being tracked by a number of European clubs despite never having made a competitive appearance for Dinamo Tirana before joining Norwegian side Rosenborg BK in 2005 on loan. At Rosenborg, Hyka did not manage to break through into the first team, failing to make a single league appearance, only featuring twice as an unused substitute in August and September 2006.

=== Greece and return to Albania ===
In 2007, Hyka left Dinamo Tirana to sign with Greek club Olympiacos for a fee of €600,000. At Olympiakos, he found opportunities in the first team limited and so he moved on loan to KF Tirana, the then champions of the 2006–07 Albanian Superliga in time for the 2007–08 season.

Back in Tirana, Hyka played 32 games, scoring two goals and his good form did not go unnoticed. Croatian side Dinamo Zagreb showed interest and Hyka was close to a move.

=== Mainz ===
In June 2008, Hyka signed a three-year deal with German side Mainz 05.

=== Panionios ===
In 2010, after just 13 appearances with the German team, most of them as a substitute, Hyka was once again on the move, this time back to Greece, transferring to Greek team, Panionios, for a €120,000 fee.

=== Return to Tirana ===
After a difficult time in Greece, Hyka returned to Albania, re-signing with former side Tirana where he had previously had a loan spell. The deal was completed on 29 January 2011, while he was still in Greece. Tirana president Refik Halili had previously expressed his desire to sign the young national team winger at the unveiling of new signing Bekim Balaj.

Hyka made his return debut on 20 February 2011 in team's goalless draw against Shkumbini Peqin at home. One month later, in a match against the same opponent, he netted his first season goal via a free-kick from 25 metres, giving his team a minimal 1–0 win. He continued with his solid appearances by scoring twice in Tirana's 4–0 defeat of Laçi in April. Only four days later, he scored his fourth goal of the season in the 6–1 defeat of Elbasani at Selman Stërmasi Stadium. Tirana finished the season in the fifth position with 44 points, failing to secure a spot in European competitions, bringing the departure of Hyka.

=== Luzern ===
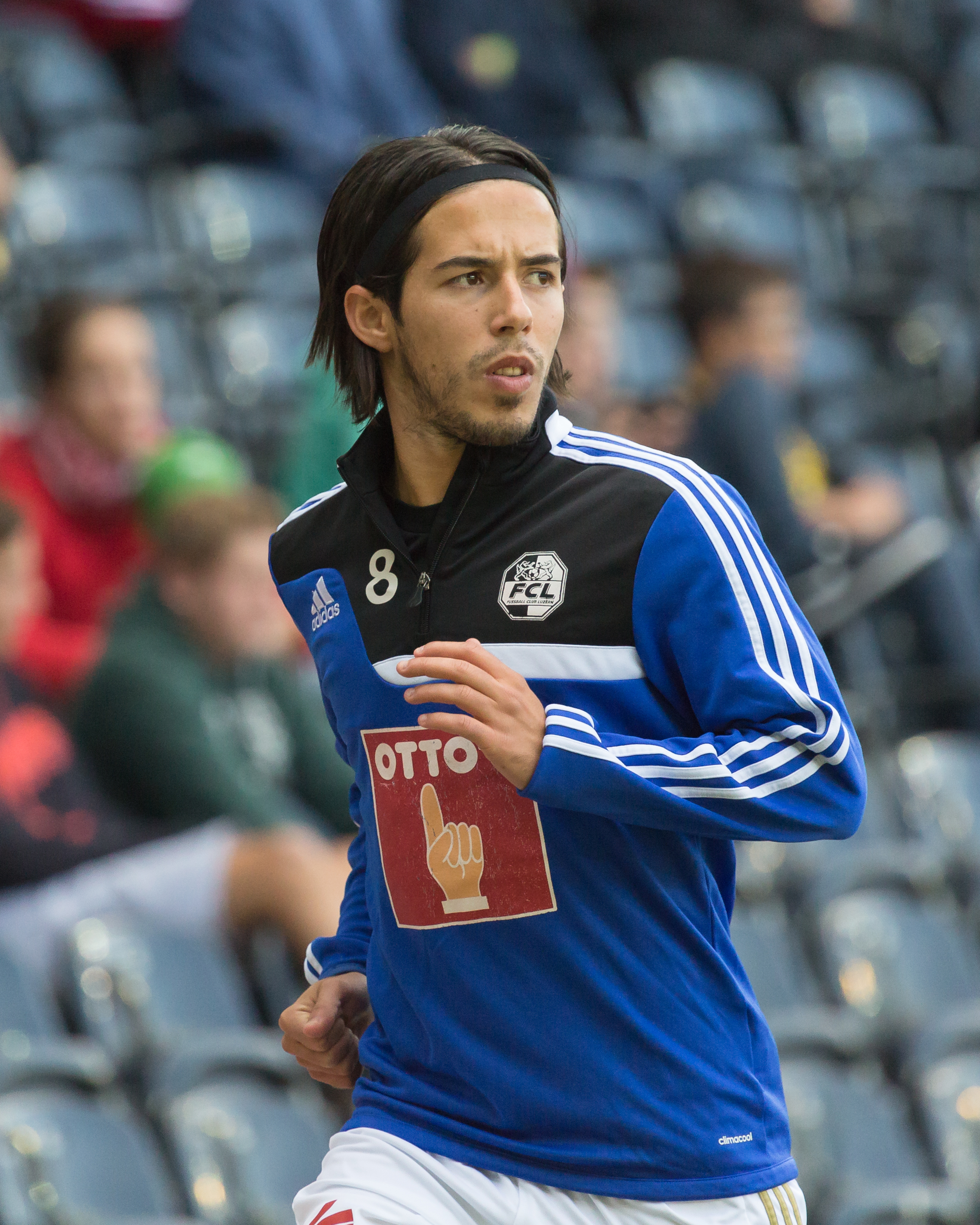
Hyka warming up before a league match for Luzern

In the summer of 2011, Hyka was transferred to FC Luzern in the Swiss Super League. He scored his first goal with Luzern on 6 August 2011 in a 1–1 draw against Young Boys after coming on as a substitute in the 62nd minute to score in the 86th minute for the equaliser. Luzern fans named him "the Messi of Albania."

Hyka scored a goal from 20 meters in a 4–1 loss against St. Gallen on 1 September 2013. He scored a goal and provided several assist for Luzern in a 2–4 win against Terre Sainte in the Swiss Cup on 15 September 2013.

=== San Jose Earthquakes ===
On 3 February 2017, Hyka signed with San Jose Earthquakes of Major League Soccer. He first appeared for the club on 25 February 2017 in the last San Jose Earthquakes preseason friendly against Sacramento Republic, substituting on at halftime and scoring also a goal in the 79th minute. Hyka made his first MLS appearance as a 70th-minute substitute in the season home opener against Montreal Impact on 4 March 2017, finished in the 1–0 victory. His first score-sheet contributions came in his second ever appearance for the club on 11 March 2017, substituting on at halftime and recording two assists to help the Earthquakes make a 3–2 comeback victory over the Vancouver Whitecaps.

On 18 March 2017, Hyka made his first MLS start in a 2–1 loss at Sporting Kansas City. His first goal was scored on 14 April 2017 with ten seconds remaining in stoppage time in what would be a 1–1 home draw against FC Dallas. Hyka opened the scoring against the Portland Timbers in the 3–0 rout on 7 May in the 8th minute of the match. He assisted the first goal scored by San Jose Designated Player Vako on 20 July against the New York Red Bulls, which finished as a 5–1 loss.

Following the end of the 2018 season, Hyka was not offered a new contract, leaving the club after collecting 52 appearances. Following his departure from the club, Hyka returned in Albania and begun training with his old club Tirana in order to maintain his form.

=== Maccabi Netanya F.C. ===
In January 2019, Hyka joined Maccabi Netanya F.C. of the Israeli Premier League on a free transfer. He scored three goals for the club in his first season.

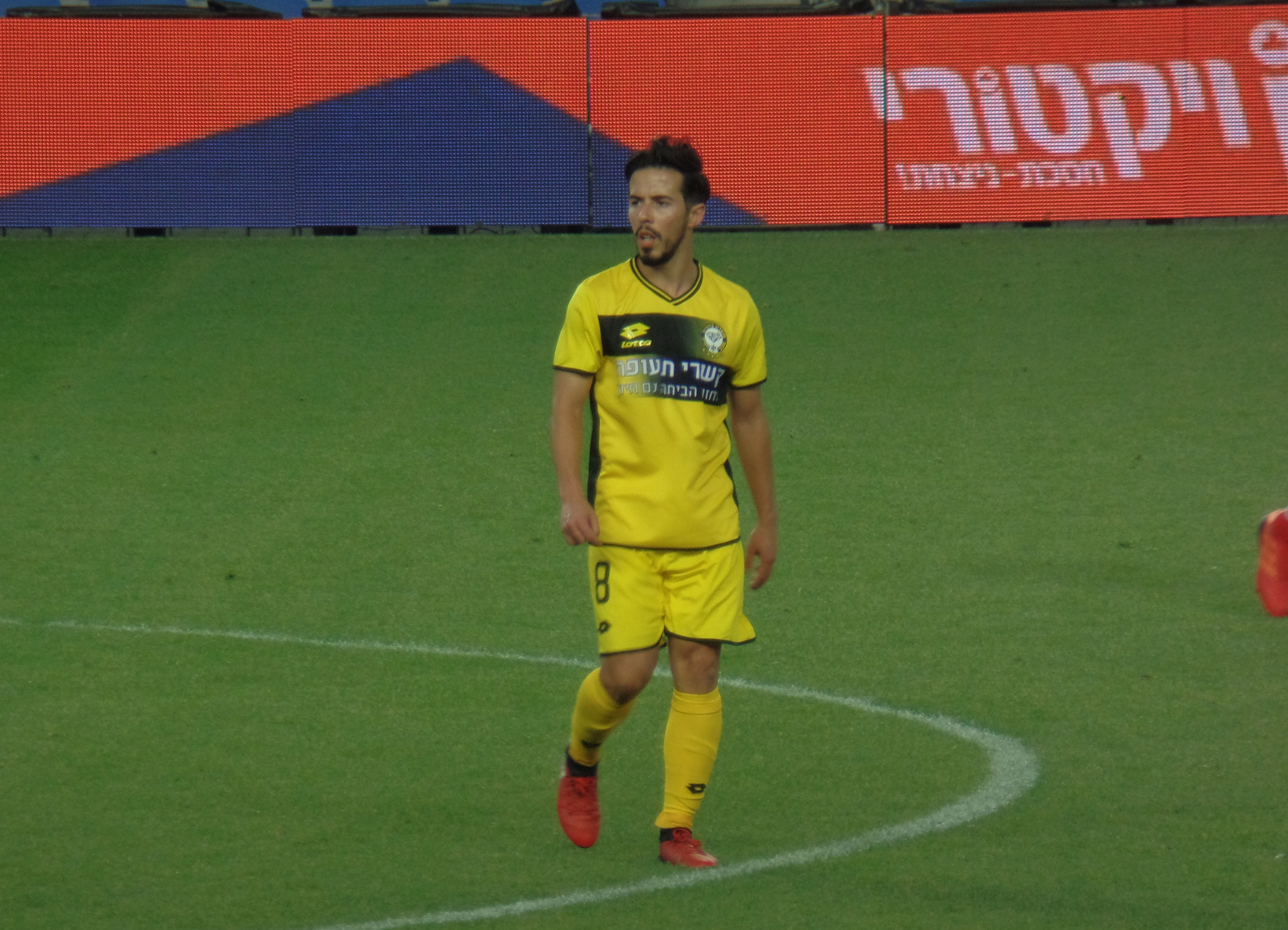

== International career ==
On 7 February 2007, Hyka made his debut for Albania in a friendly match against Macedonia. On 20 August 2008, he scored his first goal for Albania against Liechtenstein and his goal came just 46 seconds after the game had begun, making it the quickest goal in Albanian history.

Following a two-year absence, he returned to Albania national team under the same coach Gianni De Biasi, receiving a call up for the Friendly match against Morocco on 31 August 2016 and the 2018 FIFA World Cup qualification opening match against Macedonia on 5 September 2016.

== Style of play ==
A quick, energetic, and agile player, Hyka is capable of playing either as left winger or attacking midfielder. Luzern fans have nicknamed him "the Albanian Messi" due to his short stature, dribbling, and speed. Dominic Kinnear, San Jose's coach at the time of Hyka's signing with the team, praised his skills, saying, "He's really smart on the ball and confident in tight places" and adding that "he has a good first touch." Both Earthquakes general manager Jesse Fioranelli and MLS senior analyst Matt Doyle have emphasized Hyka's unpredictability on the field.

== Personal life ==
Hyka has four siblings, two sisters and two brothers who live in his hometown of Tirana. He practices the faith of Islam, praying five times daily and fasting during the holy month of Ramadan, which he has done so since the age of 12. He attends mosque when possible around his football schedule, and at his former club 1. FSV Mainz 05 he would attend with teammate Chadli Amri.

He is fluent in Albanian, German, and English.

As of 13 March 2018, Hyka possesses a U.S. green card, which qualifies him as a domestic player for MLS roster purposes.

In 2023, Hyka married his Albanian wife Enxhi Nallbani, after romantically proposing to her few months earlier in Portofino.

== Career statistics ==
=== Club ===
Appearances and goals by club, season and competition
Club	Season	League			National cup		League cup		Continental		Other		Total	
Club	Season	Division	Apps	Goals	Apps	Goals	Apps	Goals	Apps	Goals	Apps	Goals	Apps	Goals
Rosenborg (loan)	2006	Tippeligaen	0	0	0	0	—		—		—		0	0
Olympiacos	2006–07	Super League Greece	0	0	0	0	—		—		—		0	0
Tirana (loan)	2007–08	Albanian Superliga	32	2	1	0	—		—		1 (Note: Appearance in Albanian Supercup)	0	34	2
Mainz 05	2008–09	2. Bundesliga	5	0	2	0	—		—		—		7	0
Mainz 05	2009–10	Bundesliga	8	0	1	0	—		—		—		9	0
Mainz 05	Total		13	0	3	0	—		—		—		16	0
Panionios	2010–11	Super League Greece	9	0	1	0	—		—		—		10	0
Tirana	2010–11	Albanian Superliga	11	4	4	0	—		—		—		15	4
Luzern	2011–12	Swiss Super League	30	5	4	2	—		—		—		34	7
Luzern	2012–13	Swiss Super League	29	0	1	0	—		1 (Note: All appearance(s) in UEFA Europa League)	0	—		31	0
Luzern	2013–14	Swiss Super League	30	2	5	3	—		—		—		35	5
Luzern	2014–15	Swiss Super League	22	0	2	0	—		2	0	—		26	0
Luzern	2015–16	Swiss Super League	35	4	5	3	—		—		—		40	7
Luzern	2016–17	Swiss Super League	15	6	2	0	—		2	0	—		19	6
Luzern	Total		161	17	19	8	—		5	0	—		185	25
San Jose	2017	Major League Soccer	30	3	2	0	—		—		—		32	3
San Jose	2018	Major League Soccer	19	3	1	0	—		—		—		20	3
San Jose	Total		49	6	3	0	—		—		—		52	6
Maccabi Netanya	2018–19	Israeli Premier League	14	3	2	0	3	1	—		—		19	4
Maccabi Netanya	2019–20	Israeli Premier League	17	0	1	0	0	0	—		—		18	0
Maccabi Netanya	Total		31	3	3	0	3	1	—		—		37	4
Sektzia Ness Ziona	2019–20	Israeli Premier League	11	1	0	0	0	0	—		—		11	1
Guizhou Hengfeng	2020	China League One	11	2	1	0	—		—		—		12	2
Teuta	2021–22	Albanian Superliga	9	0	3	0	—		—		—		12	0
Career total			337	35	38	8	3	1	5	0	1	0	384	44

=== International ===
Appearances and goals by national team and year
National team	Year	Apps	Goals
Albania	2007	4	0
Albania	2008	5	1
Albania	2009	5	0
Albania	2010	7	0
Albania	2011	7	1
Albania	2012	6	0
Albania	2013	3	0
Albania	2014	1	0
Albania	2015	–	–
Albania	2016	4	0
Albania	2017	4	0
Total		46	2

Scores and results list Albania's goal tally first, score column indicates score after each Hyka goal.

List of international goals scored by Jahmir Hyka
No.	Date	Venue	Opponent	Score	Result	Competition
1	20 August 2008	Qemal Stafa Stadium, Tirana, Albania	Liechtenstein	1–0	2–0	Friendly
2	10 August 2011	Loro Boriçi Stadium, Shkodër, Albania	Montenegro	2–2	3–2	Friendly

== Honours ==
Rosenborg

- Tippeligaen: 2006

Olympiacos

- Super League Greece: 2006–07

Tirana

- Albanian Cup: 2010–11

Luzern

- Swiss Super League: Runner-up 2011–12

Individual

- Swiss Super League Player of the Month: April 2016
