= San Jose Earthquakes =

American professional soccer club based in San Jose, California

- Nicknames: The Quakes; The Goonies
- Founded: June 15, 1994 (32 years ago)
- Stadium: PayPal Park; San Jose, California
- Capacity: 18,000
- Owner: Heath Freeman
- President: Jared Shawlee
- Head coach: Bruce Arena
- League: Major League Soccer
- 2026: Western Conference: 4th Overall: 9th Playoffs: TBD
- Website: sjearthquakes.com
Home colors	Away colors	Third colors

The San Jose Earthquakes are an American professional soccer club based in San Jose, California. The Earthquakes compete in Major League Soccer (MLS) as a member of the Western Conference. Originally known as the San Jose Clash, the franchise began play in 1996 as one of the charter members of the league. The Earthquakes took part in the first game in MLS history, defeating D.C. United 1–0. The Earthquakes have won two MLS Cup titles (2001, 2003) and two Supporters' Shields (2005, 2012). In 2002, the team played in its first CONCACAF Champions Cup, making it to the quarterfinals. The team holds a fierce rivalry with the LA Galaxy known as the California Clásico.

In 2005, the then-owner of the Earthquakes, Anschutz Entertainment Group, announced plans of the team relocating to Houston due to failing efforts to secure a soccer-specific stadium in San Jose. The organization in Houston would be considered an expansion team by the league, eventually becoming the Houston Dynamo, which began play in 2006. The Earthquakes returned after a two-year hiatus, resuming play in 2008. Since 2015, the Earthquakes have played their home games at PayPal Park. The team previously played its home games at Buck Shaw Stadium on the Santa Clara University campus in Santa Clara, California, from 2008 to 2014.

== History ==
=== Founding and early years (1994–1999) ===
In 1994, Daniel Van Voorhis, former owner of the American Professional Soccer League's San Jose Hawks, successfully led a San Jose bidding group that was awarded one of Major League Soccer's inaugural teams. At that time, he handed over all existing Hawks player contracts, front-office resources and the rights to play in San Jose State University's Spartan Stadium to MLS in exchange for Type C stock in the league. He also became the franchise's investor-operator until outside concerns forced him to divest himself of these positions prior to the league's launch and accept a buyout from the league, leaving the franchise league-owned for several years. Meanwhile, a direct connection to the earlier Earthquakes came in the person of Peter Bridgwater, named as general manager of the MLS team. Although Bridgwater still owned the rights to the Earthquakes name and logo, the team became known as the Clash at the urging of Nike, a major investor in MLS.

On December 7, 1995, Bridgwater hired Laurie Calloway as the team's first coach, providing a second direct connection with the NASL Earthquakes, as well as a connection with the Hawks. On January 23, 1996, the Clash acquired US national team star Eric Wynalda, despite the fact that Wynalda and Calloway did not get along during their time together with the Hawks. The Clash's connections to the Blackhawks continued when the club made the first trade in MLS history, sending Rhett Harty to the MetroStars for Troy Dayak.

San Jose was an integral part of the launching of MLS, hosting the league's inaugural game at Spartan Stadium before a crowd of 31,683 on April 6, 1996. The crowd did not go away disappointed as San Jose won its first game on the first goal in MLS history from Eric Wynalda, defeating D.C. United 1–0. One month later, the club made history again, as they hosted the Los Angeles Galaxy in a match that drew 31,728 fans to Spartan Stadium, setting the record for attendance at a sporting event in the city of San Jose. But Wynalda and Calloway were soon at each other's throats again, eventually leading to a locker room brawl between Wynalda and John Doyle. The skirmish reached memorable proportions when Wynalda hired an airplane to tow a banner demanding Calloway's firing.

Although the Clash made the postseason in the inaugural MLS season in 1996, and Doyle earned recognition as the best MLS defender, the team floundered in 1997. By mid-season the team was sinking fast and Bridgwater fired Calloway and replaced him with Brian Quinn. The Clash finished 1997 at the bottom of the Western Conference standings with a 12–20 record. Things were no better in 1998, when the team finished 13–19 and well out of playoff contention. During the 1999 pre-season, the saga of player-coach antagonism continued when Richard Gough left the team after an argument with Quinn. By the end of 1999, Quinn was done and the team released him to hire Lothar Osiander.

=== Return of the Earthquakes (1999–2005) ===
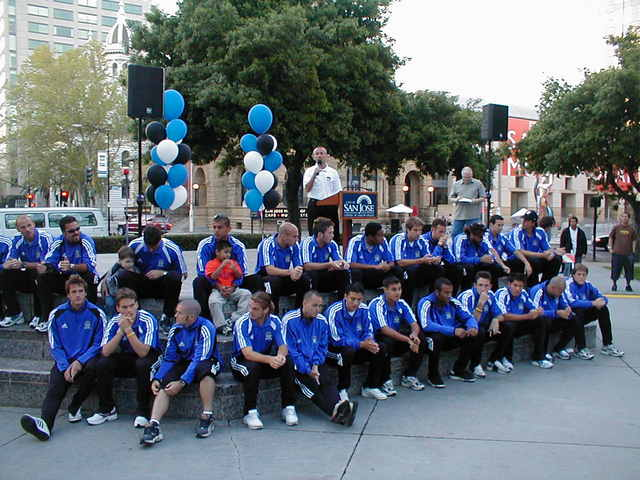
San Jose Earthquakes players, 2005

The franchise's official name changed from the Clash to the Earthquakes on October 27, 1999, as the historic name had better recognition among fans in the area. The Earthquakes had played in the North American Soccer League from 1974 to 1984 and continued in other leagues until 1988. After missing four consecutive post-seasons with three different coaches, the Earthquakes hired head coach Frank Yallop days before the 2001 MLS SuperDraft. Yallop's personnel changes and deft coaching with the help of assistant coach Dominic Kinnear and goalkeeper coach Tim Hanley, along with the allocation of star forward Landon Donovan on loan from Bayer Leverkusen, quickly turned around the Earthquakes' on-field fortunes, spurring the biggest regular season turnaround in league history (from 29 points in 2000 to 45 points in 2001) and leading the team to a 2–1 MLS Cup 2001 overtime victory over the archrival Los Angeles Galaxy.

The Quakes followed with two consecutive runners-up finishes for the MLS Supporters' Shield and a 4–2 MLS Cup 2003 win over the Chicago Fire. Prior to reaching the 2003 final, the Earthquakes had rallied from four goals down to beat the Galaxy, 5–4 on aggregate, in a first-round playoff that many MLS watchers described as the greatest in league history. Following the season, Yallop returned to his native Canada to coach the Canadian men's national soccer team being named to the post on December 16. Assistant coach Kinnear was then promoted to head coach, and former San Jose player John Doyle was named as his assistant.

Having won two MLS Cup titles in three years, the Earthquakes were poised for greater success both on and off the field. However, in January 2004, general manager Johnny Moore, whose roots with the club dated back to his days as a player for the NASL Earthquakes, resigned after AEG and MLS considered allowing the team to be rebranded as San Jose America (with ownership to transfer to the owners of Mexico's Club América). Earthquake fans were similarly outraged at the proposed rebranding, coming just months after the MLS Cup. Former Los Angeles Galaxy defender Alexi Lalas was named as Moore's replacement. Under Lalas' management, the club planned a move to Houston. Meanwhile, when the Quakes' star player, Landon Donovan, played briefly in Germany, Lalas traded away his rights, enabling Lalas' former team, the Galaxy, to acquire him.

On the field, Kinnear led the team to two more playoff appearances, including an MLS Supporters' Shield win in 2005.

=== Hiatus and return (2006–2008) ===
Following the conclusion of the 2005 season, Earthquakes owner Anschutz Entertainment Group (AEG) were granted permission to potentially move the team if a local buyer could not be found within a 30-day window. After a city-led plan to build a soccer-specific stadium was rejected, AEG announced on December 15 that the team would move to Houston for the 2006 season. MLS announced that the Earthquakes name, colors, logo, wordmark, history and competitive records would not be transferred, similar to the Cleveland Browns deal in the National Football League, to be used by a future San Jose team. The San Jose franchise was officially put on hiatus while the players, head coach Dominic Kinnear and some of his coaching staff were moved to Houston; the team were initially named Houston 1836 and later the Houston Dynamo. The Houston Dynamo is technically considered an expansion team by MLS just as the Baltimore Ravens is by the NFL.

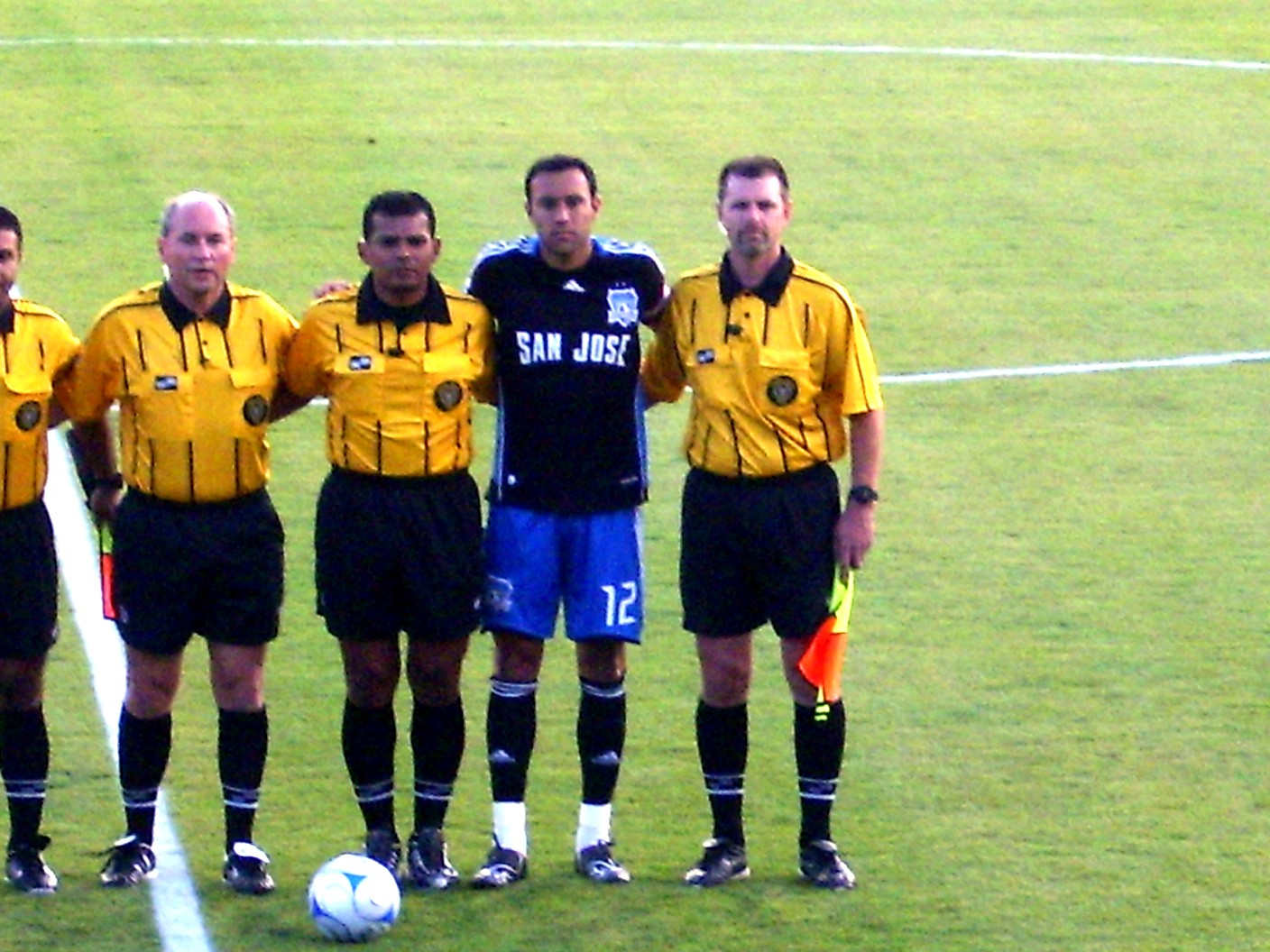
Earthquakes captain Ramiro Corrales during the team's first season back in MLS

On May 24, 2006, an agreement was reached between Major League Soccer and the principal owners of the Oakland Athletics baseball team, Lewis Wolff and John Fisher, granting them a three-year exclusive option to develop a soccer-specific stadium and bring an expansion franchise to the San Francisco Bay Area. An expansion team under the Earthquakes name was formally awarded to the duo by MLS on July 18, 2007. While functionally being the 14th franchise to join MLS, the team retained all records, logos, colors and titles of the 1996–2005 franchise and is a continuation of that franchise. Michael Crowley, also Oakland A's president at the time, led the relaunched franchise and served as president until 2010.

In October 2007, the Earthquakes announced they would be moving their offices from the Fairmont Hotel in downtown San Jose to an office park across the street from their temporary home, Buck Shaw Stadium, and across the Caltrain tracks from the location of the former FMC site. On November 6, 2007, the team announced that former Earthquakes coach Frank Yallop was returning to the team as head coach. According to ESPN.com, the Earthquakes compensated Yallop's previous employer, the Los Angeles Galaxy, with a third-round pick in the 2008 MLS SuperDraft.

=== Return to MLS ===
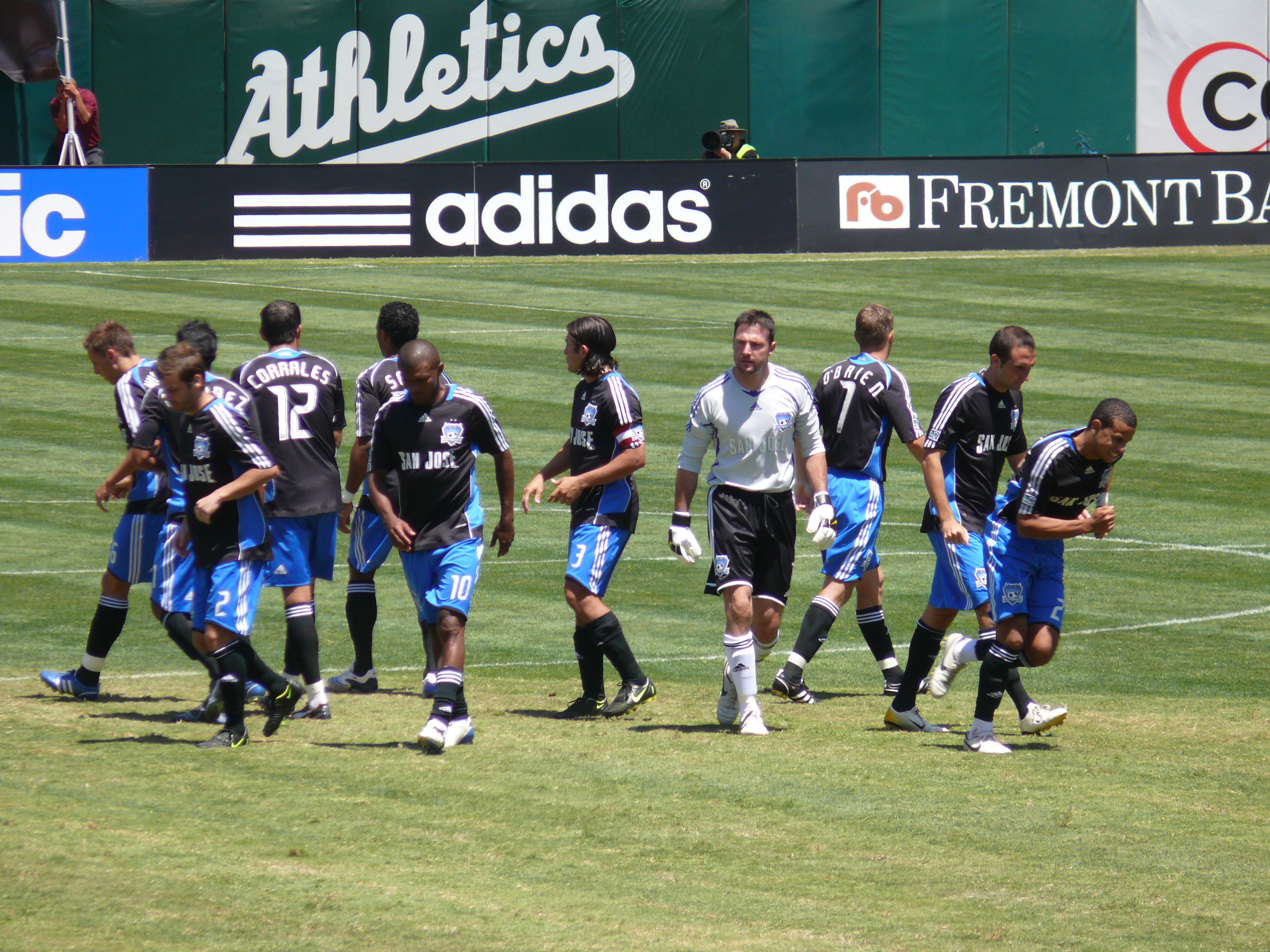
The San Jose Earthquakes on the field at the O.co Coliseum in 2008

In 2008, England's Darren Huckerby, the MLS Newcomer of the Year and Ireland's Ronnie O'Brien, who made 28 appearances for the Earthquakes, helped anchor the offense, combining for 10 goals and 10 assists. Both played a key part of the team's nine-game unbeaten streak that saw San Jose push towards a playoff berth. They also failed to qualify for the U.S. Open Cup, losing to Real Salt Lake 4–0 in the first round of qualifying. In October the Earthquakes signed a partnership agreement with English Premier League club Tottenham Hotspur.

On January 27, 2009, Amway Global signed a three-year deal with the Earthquakes to become the team's official jersey sponsor. The club made a historic trade on June 9, 2009, when they acquired Chris Wondolowski from Houston.

The Quakes missed out on the playoffs for a second consecutive season in 2009 but looked to build on a solid second half of the year, which saw them go 4–4–4 following the All-Star Break. The Earthquakes finished in 14th place and failed to qualify for the playoffs. The Earthquakes also failed to qualify for the U.S. Open Cup, losing to New York Red Bulls on April 29, 2–1.

In 2010, the San Jose Earthquakes qualified for the playoffs as the West's No. 6 seed with 46 points. In the 2010 MLS playoffs, they were matched up with the No. 1 seeded New York Red Bulls. After losing the first game by a score of 1–0, the Earthquakes defeated the Red Bulls in the second game by a score of 3–1 to win the aggregate, 3–2, and upset New York. In the single-elimination semi-final match against the Colorado Rapids, at Colorado, the Quakes suffered a 1–0 defeat.

In 2011, the San Jose Earthquakes missed the playoffs after they finished seventh in the west and fourteenth in all of MLS.

=== The Goonies (2012–2014) ===
In 2012, the San Jose Earthquakes had the best start in franchise history. The team established a habit of scoring late goals to tie or win games. The first was a match against Real Salt Lake on April 21, 2012, scoring 2 goals in stoppage time to win 3–1. The next week, a stoppage time goal produced a win against the Philadelphia Union. Two more games resulted in ties with late goals, both scored by Alan Gordon. On May 23, 2012, against the L.A. Galaxy, the Quakes scored 3 times in 18 minutes to win 3–2. After this game striker Steven Lenhart declared "Goonies never say die!" (a reference to the movie The Goonies), and this was made into the rally cry of the team.

The Quakes ended the 2012 regular season with 66 points and 72 goals, both team records, with 17 of those points created by goals scored in the 84th minute or later. The team clinched the Supporter's Shield, its first major trophy since their return to San Jose, and qualified for their first CONCACAF Champion's League tournament as a franchise in 2013. They returned to the playoffs for the first time since their 2010 season and faced two games against L.A. Galaxy. In their first playoff game, the Quakes scored a stoppage time goal to take the away leg 1–0, but were knocked out of the playoffs following a 3–1 loss at home (3–2 on aggregate), their only loss at Buck Shaw Stadium for the season.

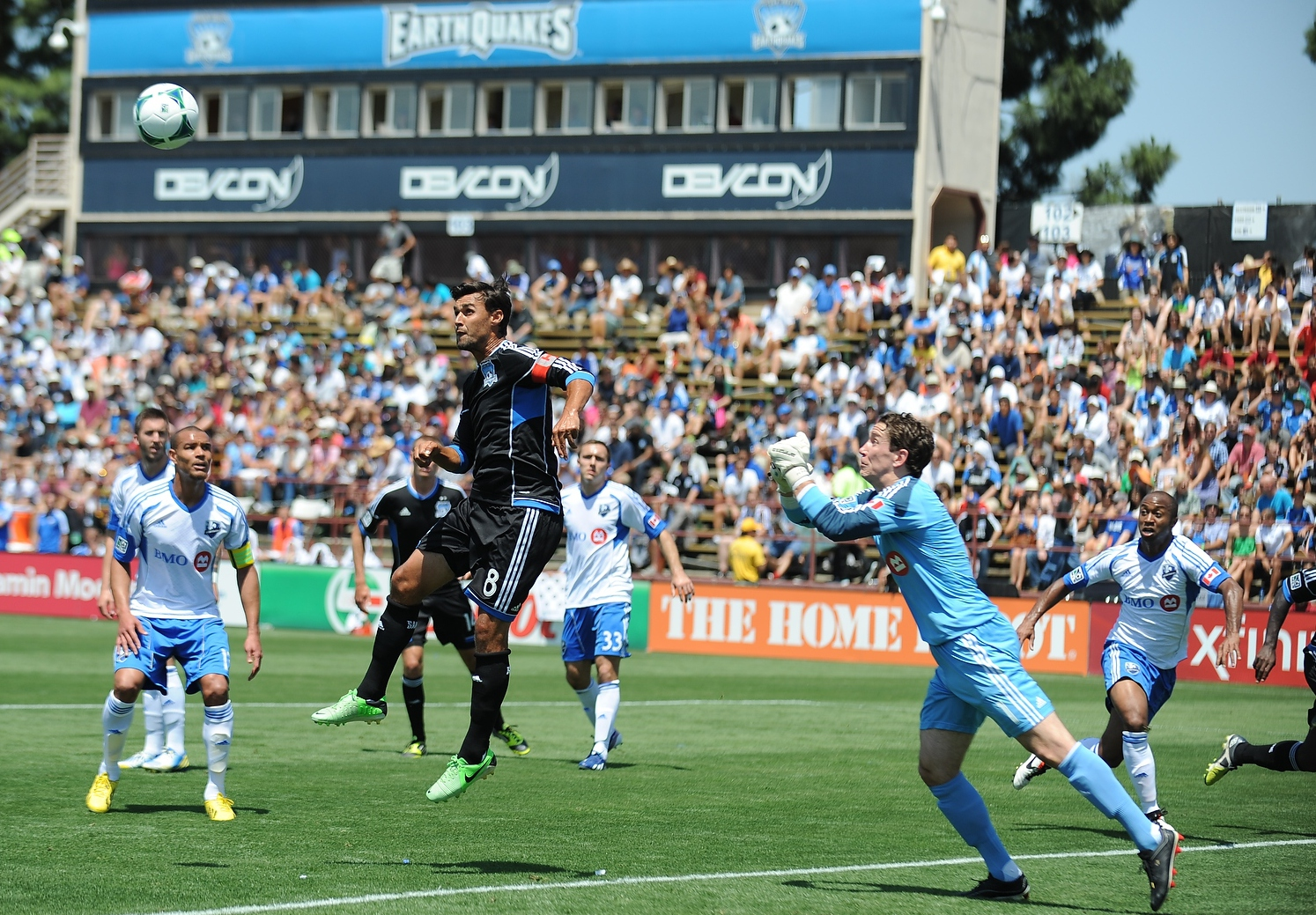
San Jose forward Chris Wondolowski (front, black kit) attempts a header against Montreal in 2013

In 2013, the Quakes began the year facing adversity with numerous players recovering from injury. With added depth in preparation for the upcoming CONCACAF Champions' League, they began the task of duplicating the success of 2012. While the style of scoring late goals were still present in games against New York, Portland and Montreal, the team struggled to find success and quickly found themselves at the bottom of the Western Conference. The slow start of the team led to the departure of coach Frank Yallop and Mark Watson was named interim coach.

On June 29, 2013, the Quakes played the L.A. Galaxy in the California Clásico. Despite being down 2–0 and having Victor Bernardez ejected, the Quakes staged another comeback, scoring twice in stoppage time to win 3–2, becoming the first MLS team to do so.

On August 7, 2013, the Earthquakes debuted in the 2013–14 CONCACAF Champions League for the first time since their return to MLS. They lost the away game to the Montreal Impact 1–0. On October 23, 2013, the Earthquakes won group five on goal differential with a win at home against Heredia, and they moved on to the knockout stage of the tournament.

Despite a league best record in games played after June, the Quakes failed to qualify for the 2013 playoffs, losing the final spot to Colorado on a goal differential tiebreaker. The final home game of the season, a 2–0 win against FC Dallas, saw the final minutes of professional soccer for Ramiro Corrales, who had announced his retirement. Corrales was the last remaining active player who played in the inaugural season of MLS.

The Quakes reached the quarterfinals against Toluca in the 2013–14 CONCACAF Champions League. Scoring a goal in stoppage time in the first game, the Quakes went to Mexico 1–1 on aggregate. In the second game, the game tied in regulation. The Quakes faced Toluca in Overtime where neither team could score against the other and the game went on to penalties. The Earthquakes lost 5–4 against Toluca in penalties and were eliminated. San Jose ended the 2014 season with the club's worst record, winning only 6 matches and suffering a 15-match winless streak. That streak surpassed the Quakes' previous record of 13 in 2011, and matched the second worst in league history.

=== Return of Dominic Kinnear (2015–2017) ===
The Earthquakes welcomed back Dominic Kinnear to the club as coach after a nine-year tenure in Houston. The franchise's long-awaited stadium, Avaya Stadium, was the first professional soccer-specific stadium in the Bay Area when it opened on March 22.

The 2015 season was a marked improvement over the previous season, but the Earthquakes still failed to reach the playoffs despite a late surge. Chris Wondolowski became only the ninth player in MLS history to score 100 goals with a penalty in a 1–1 draw against Orlando.

On August 29, 2016, the Earthquakes parted ways with longtime general manager John Doyle. Earthquakes President Dave Kaval stated that he felt the Earthquakes "needed a fresh approach". Technical director Chris Leitch was appointed as interim GM.

=== Fioranelli era (2017–2021) ===
Following the firing of John Doyle, it was announced on January 5, 2017, that Jesse Fioranelli had been hired as general manager. He joined San Jose from A.S. Roma and had previously also worked at Roma's cross-city rival S.S. Lazio.

Fioranelli made clear early on that he would be prioritizing youth development, international scouting, and generally creating a new identity for San Jose that was younger, more dynamic, and more attacking, intentions which were reflected by his off-season acquisitions of Jahmir Hyka, Florian Jungwirth, Marco Ureña, Harold Cummings, and Danny Hoesen using Targeted Allocation Money. He also expressed the necessity of the team reaching the playoffs in 2017, as it had not done so since 2012. Illustrating the seriousness of his commitment to improving San Jose, within one week in April Fioranelli made two key additions to the technical staff with the hiring of Alex Covelo as Director of Methodology and Bruno Costa as Head of Scouting. Dave Kaval stepped down from his role as president on June 1, to be replaced by former Aston Villa F.C. chief executive and Arsenal F.C. chief commercial officer Tom Fox. On June 22, 2017, San Jose announced Fioranelli's first Designated Player signing, Georgian attacking midfielder Vako, who would join San Jose from SBV Vitesse.

Fioranelli took his ambitions for San Jose a step further just several days later, when he announced on June 25, 2017, that Dominic Kinnear had been fired, and would be replaced immediately and permanently by Chris Leitch, the club's technical director and former interim general manager. Assistant coach John Spencer was also let go, and was replaced by Covelo. The timing of the firing came as somewhat of a surprise, as it was announced hours after San Jose defeated Real Salt Lake 2–1 at home. Fioranelli said of the firing that, coming off of a win, it was not reactionary, and rather he had "in the last two to three months...matured a gut feeling as to where [the club stands]", and that his respect for Kinnear "would not have allowed [him] to want to go for another three months knowing [they] would have parted ways at the end of the season". In his first interview as head coach, Leitch reiterated Fioranelli's previously stated goals, saying that "the goal of the team...is [to] make the playoffs". His first outing as head coach on June 28, 2017, was successful, seeing the Earthquakes achieve their first-ever victory over an MLS side in the U.S. Open Cup with a 2–1 victory against Seattle Sounders FC that would advance them to the USOC quarter finals for the first time since 2012.

Leitch's first MLS match as head coach was a 2–1 win over the LA Galaxy at Stanford Stadium on July 1, in which Chris Wondolowski scored the equalizing goal off of an assist from goalkeeper David Bingham and substitute Shea Salinas scored the winner in the 93rd minute. The team experienced its first loss under Leitch three days later on July 4 at Bobby Dodd Stadium, in a 4–2 loss to Atlanta United FC following red cards to both Kofi Sarkodie and Victor Bernardez; however, this match also saw Tommy Thompson score his first league goal and Chris Wondolowski break Ramiro Corrales' record for career starts at San Jose with his 229th start, as well as tie the league record for most goals scored away at 63.

On July 7, 2017, a multi-year collaboration between the Earthquakes and the German Football Association was announced, "focused on knowledge exchange, game development and machine learning".

On July 10, 2017, the Earthquakes defeated the Galaxy 3–2 at home, following a brace from Chris Wondolowski and Danny Hoesen's second goal of the tournament, to advance to the semifinals of the U.S. Open Cup for the first time since 2004 and for only the second time in club history. Wondolowski wore the number 38 in this match in honor of teammate Matheus Silva, who nearly drowned the previous week. New signing Vako was introduced at the club for the first time during halftime. Vako made his club debut four days later as a 63rd minute substitution in San Jose's 4–1 friendly defeat of Eintracht Frankfurt, and shortly afterwards scored in his MLS debut as a halftime substitute against the New York Red Bulls at Red Bull Arena on July 19.

The Earthquakes announced a second new partnership aimed at pursuing the implementation of artificial intelligence and machine learning on July 21 with Los Angeles-based company Second Spectrum, Inc., the first of its kind in the league and inspired by the company's partnerships with the NBA and specifically the Golden State Warriors. Per this agreement, a new system was installed at Avaya Stadium to track players during matches and gather data on tactics and performance, to be delivered to players' mobile devices directly after games. The signing of Swiss defender François Affolter from FC Luzern was announced later the same day.

San Jose lost in the Open Cup semifinals to Sporting Kansas City, for the second time in franchise history, in sudden death penalties on August 9. On August 19, Wondolowski became the first player in MLS history to score ten or more goals in eight consecutive seasons, following his successful penalty kick in the dying moments of a 2–2 home draw against the Philadelphia Union, when Shea Salinas was tripped in the box by Joshua Yaro. San Jose qualified for the 2017 MLS Cup Playoffs, the club's first playoff appearance since 2012, following a 3–2 win at home on October 22 over Minnesota United FC in which Danny Hoesen and Chris Wondolowski each recorded a goal and an assist, and substitute Marco Ureña scored the stoppage time winner. This sent the team on to play a knockout round match on the road against Vancouver Whitecaps FC on October 25. However, the team was defeated 5–0.

On November 24, 2017, Mikael Stahre, formerly of BK Häcken, was announced as the team's new head coach. Leitch returned to his previous role as the club's technical director. San Jose began to make roster moves not long after with contract options being declined for players, most notably for defender Víctor Bernárdez and goalkeeper David Bingham who spent six and seven years with the Earthquakes organization respectively. San Jose traded Bingham's MLS rights to their rival Los Angeles Galaxy on December 18. December also brought additions to the roster, reflecting different aspects of San Jose's leadership and management. On December 1, 2017, Joel Qwiberg was signed from IF Brommapojkarna where he had helped to lead the team to two consecutive promotions, reaching Sweden's topic league. The next signing of the off-season was homegrown goalkeeper JT Marcinkowski, who had finished his 3rd year at Georgetown. Just over a week later, San Jose announced in a joint press conference with their USL affiliate Reno 1868 that they had signed three players from the team: Luis Felipe, Chris Wehan, and Jimmy Ockford. Reno's club president elaborated on what the signings meant for both organizations, stating "Today's news delivers on that promise to compete in Reno while developing the future of San Jose." The next day San Jose continued on their developmental based signings with defender Jacob Akanyirige announced as signed straight from their academy at fifteen years old, San Jose's youngest ever player and the eighth youngest player in MLS history. On December 20, the first Designated Player and second Swedish signing under Stahre's tenure was officially brought to San Jose. Magnus Eriksson joined from Djurgårdens IF where he co-led the Allsvenskan as top scorer in the 2017 season.

Stahre was dismissed by the club before the end of his first year in charge, a season in which the team earned just four wins. On October 8, 2018, the club announced that they had hired reigning CONCACAF coach of the year Matias Almeyda, who would take charge for the 2019 season. On May 18, 2019, Wondolowski scored four goals against Chicago Fire. With his second goal, he set the league's all-time scoring record. The team had a negative record and missed the playoffs by four points.

In 2020, the Earthquakes had a draw and a loss in their first two regular season games before the season was shut down due to the COVID-19 pandemic. When the season resumed with the MLS is Back tournament, the Earthquakes were drawn into Group B with FC Dallas (later replaced by the Chicago Fire), Seattle Sounders FC, and Vancouver Whitecaps FC. They drew with Seattle and defeated both Chicago and Vancouver, the latter with a thrilling comeback from a 3–1 deficit, to win the group and advance to the round of 16.

=== Leitch era (2021–2025) ===
The Earthquakes would announce the firing of Fioranelli effective immediately on June 29, 2021, with technical director Chris Leitch and coach Matías Almeyda keeping their positions, along with the rest of the coaching staff. On November 8 of the same year, Chris Leitch, former technical director, was named as the new General Manager. On April 18, 2022, the Earthquakes and Matias Almeyda agreed to part ways. Alex Covelo, the head coach of the newly established San Jose Earthquakes II side, stepped in as his interim replacement. Covelo was joined by an assistant coaching staff consisting of former San Jose player Chris Wondolowski, former assistant manager and interim manager Steve Ralston, and Earthquakes II assistant Luciano Fusco. On August 17, 2022, the Earthquakes announced Luchi Gonzalez, at the time an assistant coach with the USMNT, to be the next coach of the team. During the 2023 season under Gonzalez, the Earthquakes placed 9th, qualifying for the Wild Card round of the playoffs (the first playoff match in 3 years for the Quakes), but falling to Sporting Kansas City on penalties after a scoreless draw, dropping them out of the competition.

=== The Arena era (2024–present) ===
After a poor string of results brought them to the bottom of the league to begin the 2024 season, Gonzalez was fired on June 24, being replaced by Assistant Head Coach Ian Russell, with assistant staff Steve Ralston, Luciano Fusco, and Adin Brown retaining their positions. Despite the coaching change, the Earthquakes would finish off their season dead-last in MLS thus breaking the league record for the most last-place finishes in franchise history. The Earthquakes announced Bruce Arena as new head coach and sporting director on November 7, 2024. The following 2025 season saw the team place 10th, barely missing out on the 9th-place wild-card playoff spot. On November 14, 2025, the team would announce the "mutually agreed" departure of General Manager Chris Leitch, without naming a new or interim GM.

Ahead of the 2026 Season season the team released Josef Martínez, and sent Cristian Arango on loan to Atlético Nacional. Based on Landon Donovan's unfiltered soccer podcast, a worker for the Earthquakes "forgot to trigger Cristian Espinoza's option" making him a free agent. To respond to losing three major strikers, Bruce Arena signed star striker Timo Werner from RB Leipzig becoming San Jose's biggest transfer in history; prompting San Jose to have the best start to the 2026 Season becoming the first team to win 9 of their first 10 games in the post-shootout era.

On June 18, 2025, it was announced that owner John Fisher had put the team up for sale. On November 13, 2026, the club announced that John Fisher would be selling the club and PayPal Park to businessman Heath Freeman.

== Crest and jerseys ==
Since their inception, the Earthquakes have played in a color scheme featuring blue and black as dominant colors, usually with white highlights. The original San Jose Clash logo featured a stylized scorpion in black and red with a white 'clash' wordmark.

When they rebranded to the Earthquakes in 2000, the team badge featured an inverted triangular shield containing a soccer ball invoking the rising sun used in the logo for the City of San Jose, a stylized 'Earthquakes' wordmark, and a color palette of blue, black, white and silver. The three points of the triangular shield represented the three largest communities of the Bay Area (San Jose, San Francisco and Oakland).

The team rebranded again on January 30, 2014, to a new crest and uniform. While still featuring blue and black, as well as a new chevron design that invokes the geologic theme of the team's name, the new design also featured the year 1974 in red; this is an explicit reference of lineage to the previous NASL incarnation of the Earthquakes that had founded that year.

On February 17, 2017, San Jose released its new home kit at a jersey release party at San Pedro Square. The new kit is black, a callback to the black Goonies kits of the historic 2012 season, and features the blue slipstrike design from the crest on the front. Also included is a red neck tape, referring again to the team's NASL history, "SJ 74" in blue on the bottom left corner, and the words "UNITY", "DEVOTION", and "HERITAGE" written in white across the blue border on the right sleeve.

On February 11, 2018, the Earthquakes released their new away kit, the Navy SEAL Foundation Jersey, and announced that 5% of each jersey sale would be donated to the Foundation, becoming the first club in MLS history to donate part of its jersey revenue to a nonprofit organization. The jersey release party was held near the site of the USS Hornet Museum and the kit itself presented by a retired SEAL alongside squad members Tommy Thompson, Joel Qwiberg, and, offshore in a military rescue boat, Nick Lima and Jackson Yueill.

The 2020–21 away jersey incorporated the colors of the flag of San Jose (blue, white, yellow).

The 2024–25 away jersey honors the club's 50th anniversary with red and white colors, featuring a retro NASL-era crest that reads “EARTHQUAKES” in swooping red and black letters, with the “Q” breaking through a soccer ball and “SAN JOSE” printed in black lettering below.

The 2025–26 home jersey named "Headliner" is a blue-and-black jersey designed in collaboration with punk icon Lars Frederiksen to celebrate Bay Area punk rock history. It features a chaotic newspaper headline collage, lyrics from the Quakes' official anthem, "Never Say Die" written by Lars Frederiksen, and a jock tag that says “Soccer for the People” to "call out the most important connection: the undying one between the Quakes and their community."

The 2025 third jersey rewind kit, as part of the 2025 adidas Archive Collection is a throwback to the 1996 San Jose Clash kit inspired by its sharp angles; the jersey includes a San Jose Clash badge.

The 2026–27 away jersey celebrates Grateful Dead's influence on the Bay Area's psychedelic music scene. The jersey includes a Tie-dye design with blue and pink colors, and features Grateful Dead's iconic skull logo.

=== Uniform history ===
Home

1996	1997–98	1999	2000–02	2003–04	2005	2008	2009	2010–11	2012–13

2014–16	2017–18	2019–20	2021–22	2023–24	2025–26

Away

2000–01	2002–03	2004	2005	2008–09	2010–11	2012–13	2014	2015	2016

2017	2018–19	2020–21	2022–23	2024–25	2026–27

== Stadium ==
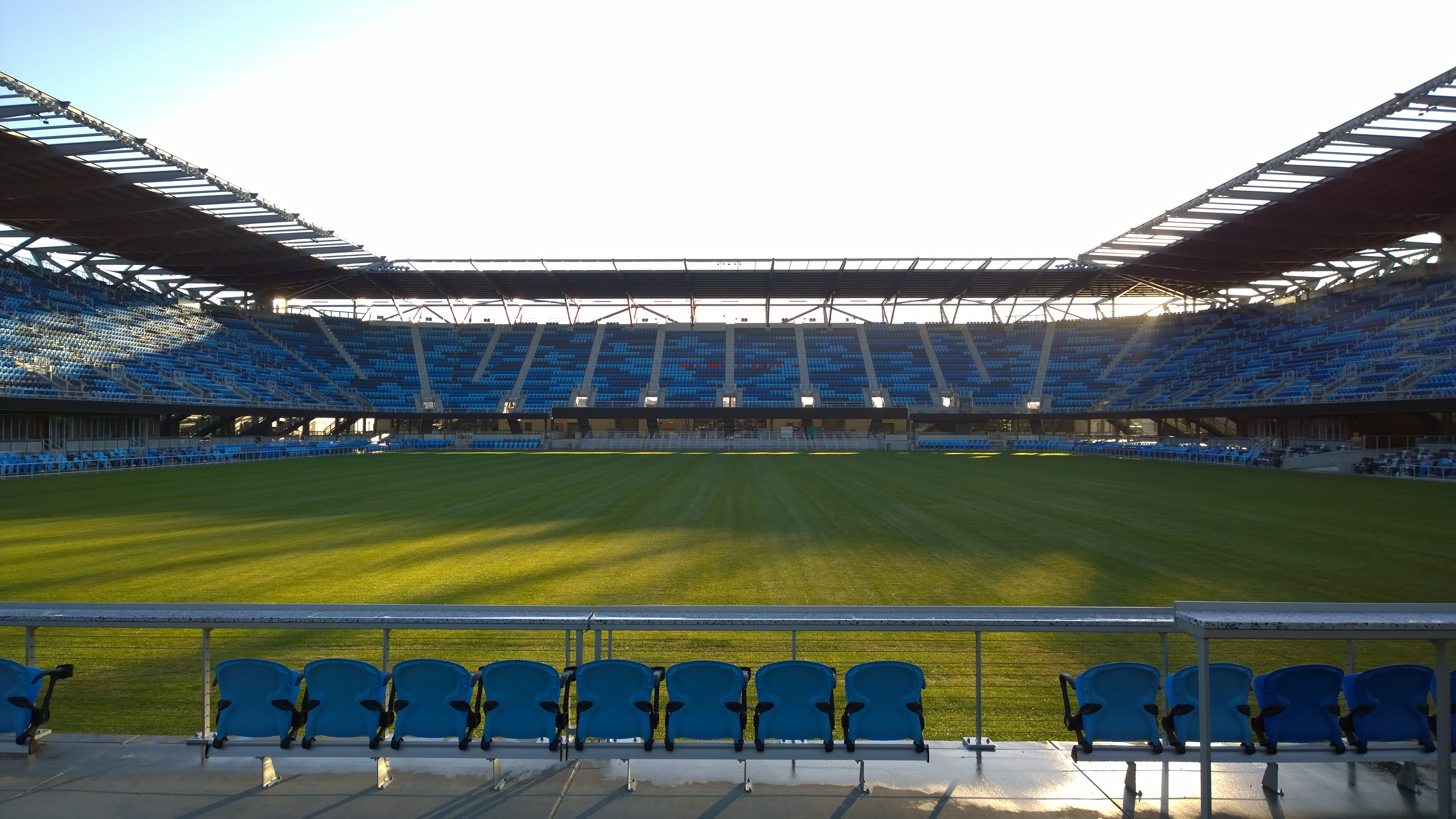
PayPal Park in San Jose, California

Name	Location	Years
Spartan Stadium	San Jose, California	1996–2005
Buck Shaw Stadium	Santa Clara, California	2008–2014
Oakland–Alameda County Coliseum	Oakland, California	2008–2009 (big game venue)
Levi's Stadium	Santa Clara, California	2014–2015, 2023–2024 (marquee venue)
Stanford Stadium	Stanford, California	2011–present (big game venue, scheduled in July)
PayPal Park	San Jose, California	2015–present

U.S. Open Cup:

- Negoesco Stadium: San Francisco, California (July 24, 2001) vs LA Galaxy
- Cagan Stadium: Stanford, California (2011–2012)
- Kezar Stadium: San Francisco, California (2012, 2014)

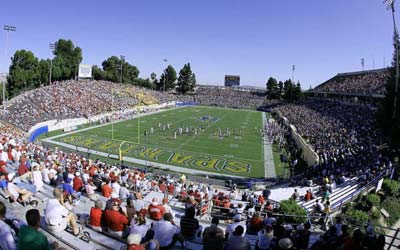
Spartan Stadium was the club's home venue from 1996 to 2005

On January 13, 2007, the San Jose Mercury News reported that the city of San Jose, San Jose State University and the Earthquakes owners were in negotiations to build a soccer stadium just east of the Earthquakes' previous home, Spartan Stadium. The new facility, to have 22,000 permanent seats but be expandable to a capacity of 30,000 for single games, would be privately built by Lewis Wolff and John Fisher, the primary owners of the Earthquakes, with San Jose State providing the needed land. Additionally, the team and the university would build community soccer fields across Senter Road in Kelley Park using San Jose municipal bond money that had been approved years earlier for the purpose but never spent. The plan was for the new version of the San Jose Earthquakes to play in Spartan Stadium during the 2008 MLS season, then move into the new stadium in 2009. Plans for the stadium collapsed on April 19 of that year after the Earthquakes and SJSU could not come to an agreement on revenue sharing.

=== PayPal Park ===
On May 8, the city of San Jose and Earthquakes Soccer, LLC confirmed that their new primary focus was on a site near San Jose International Airport on the site of the former FMC plant. The new site was owned by the city, which was exploring either leasing it to Earthquakes Soccer, LLC or selling it outright. The 75-acre (30 ha) site is adjacent to not only the airport but the planned BART extension to Santa Clara and the existing Santa Clara Caltrain station, and near both Interstate 880 and U.S. Route 101. On June 12, 2007, the San Jose City Council voted unanimously to enter into a Memorandum of Understanding to explore construction of a new stadium to bring MLS back to San Jose and adopted a resolution authorizing the city manager to enter into an Exclusive Right to Negotiate agreement with Wolff and his partners regarding the potential development of the former FMC site. The first payment on the new stadium land of $3 million was made in June 2008.

The preliminary designs were released to the public on September 19, 2009. Earthquakes Stadium was slated to be a three-sided European style stadium with 18,000 permanent seats and a grass berm at the open end.

On March 16, 2010, the San Jose city council voted 9–0 to rezone the Airport West property to allow for development of the new Earthquakes Stadium.

The San Jose Earthquakes franchise made history when 6,256 people participated in groundbreaking for the new stadium. This set a world record by Guinness World Records as the largest ever crowd to participate in a groundbreaking ceremony. The construction was completed in early 2015 and hosted its first event, a friendly, pre-season match against LA Galaxy, on February 28, 2015. The stadium's official opening took place on March 22, 2015, when the Earthquakes hosted Chicago Fire for their first home game of the 2015 MLS regular season. Fatai Alashe scored the first official, regular-season goal at Avaya in the fifth minute of the 2–1 victory.

== Club culture ==
=== Rivalries ===
The California Clásico is a rivalry between two Major League Soccer teams, the LA Galaxy and the San Jose Earthquakes, which existed from 1996 to 2005 and was resumed in 2008. It is considered to be one of the oldest rivalries in American soccer. The rivalry originated from the historical Northern California vs. Southern California sporting and cultural rivalries, as well as from the relative proximity of the cities (about 360 miles apart) which allows rival fans to attend each other's games. While there have been several players to play for both teams beforehand, the rivalry intensified after the Anschutz Entertainment Group (owner of the Los Angeles Galaxy) took sole ownership of the San Jose Earthquakes in December 2002. The rivalry reached its peak from 2001 to 2005, during which time the Earthquakes and the Galaxy combined to win four MLS Cup titles in a five-year period. Both clubs reached MLS Cup 2001, with San Jose posting a 2–1 overtime victory on goals by Landon Donovan and Dwayne DeRosario.

The Heritage Cup with Seattle Sounders FC was begun in the 2009 MLS season by the respective supporters' groups. Any present or future MLS teams that carry on the names of their NASL predecessors are eligible for the Cup, but supporters of the other eligible MLS teams (Portland Timbers and Vancouver Whitecaps FC) have chosen not to participate. San Jose and Seattle have had a rivalry since the NASL. However, it did not completely resurface during the 2009 season with fans of both teams viewing other clubs as bigger rivals. That season, the first MLS meeting of the teams was not considered for the competition due to the schedule consisting of two games in Seattle and only one in San Jose. Seattle won the initial meeting at home 2–0 and the second 2–1. The Earthquakes won the inaugural cup on goals scored after a 4–0 home victory on August 2, 2009.

=== Support ===
Among the supporters' groups affiliated with the Earthquakes are the San Jose Ultras, Club Quake, Soccer Silicon Valley, The Casbah, The Faultline, and Epicentro74.

Punk musician, Lars Frederiksen is a supporter of the Earthquakes. Along with his band, The Old Firm Casuals, he wrote the new anthem and theme song, "Never Say Die", for the club, which was performed as part of the team's rebranding ceremony on January 30, 2014. The song features backing vocals by various team members. Frederiksen said of the team that they are the most "punk rock" team in the MLS.

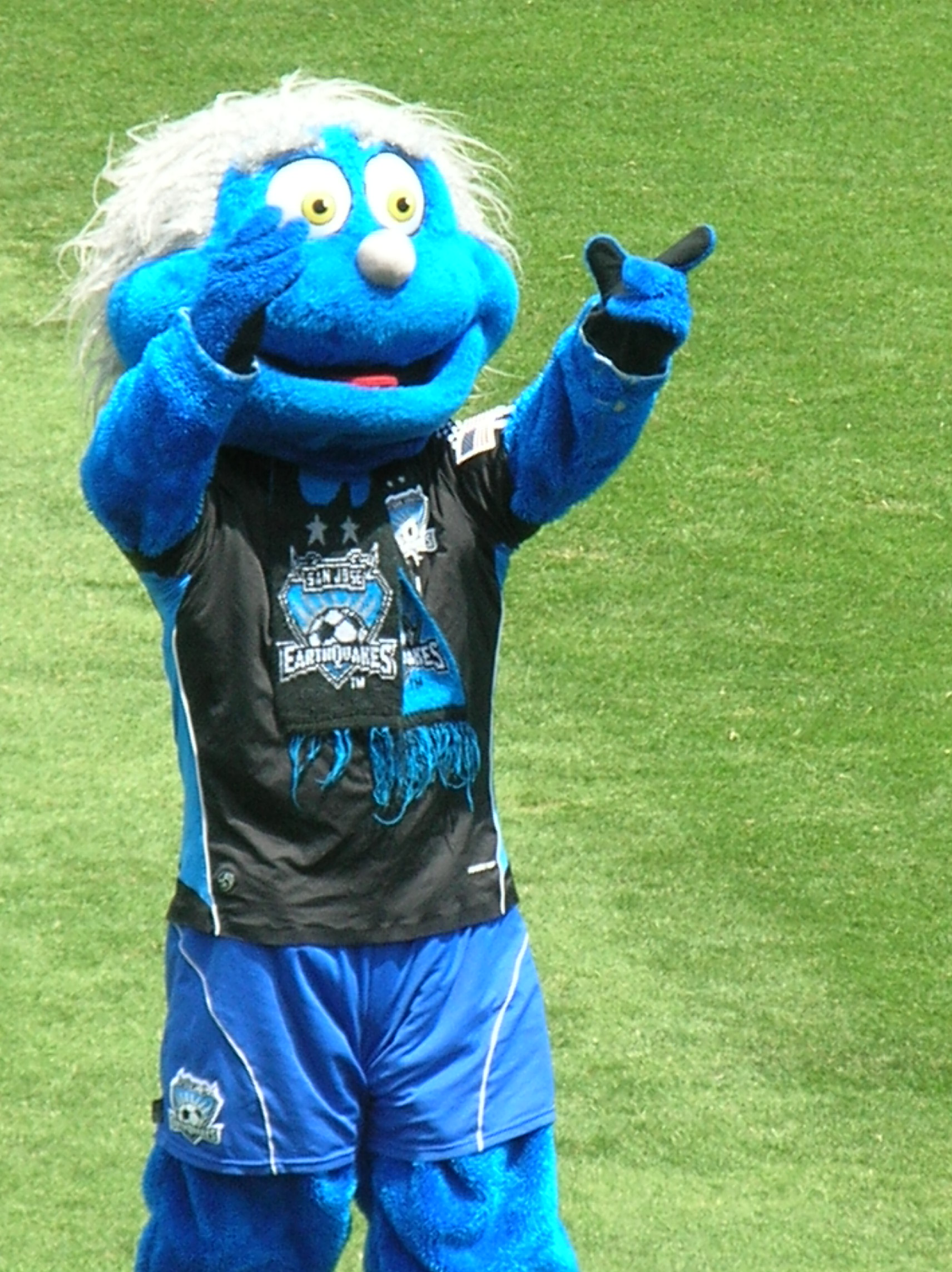
Q at a home game in August 2010

=== Mascots ===
- José Clash (1996–1999)
- Rikter the CyberDog (2000–2002)
- Q (2004–2005), (2008–present)

There was no mascot in 2003.

On April 26, 2010, Q was one of three mascots featured on KNTV, along with San Jose Sharks mascot S.J. Sharkie and San Jose Giants mascot "Gigante".

== Revenue and profitability ==
At the beginning of 2013, the Quakes had 5,000 season ticket holders, and although revenues had been increasing, the Quakes stadium did not allow them to generate sufficient revenues to be profitable. Quakes management predicted in 2013 that season ticket sales would double once they move into their new stadium, and the Quakes would become profitable at that time. Management also stated that they are "pursuing independent revenue streams that will provide the team with real and lasting financial freedom." With the completion of their new soccer-specific Avaya Stadium, in early 2015 the Earthquakes reached their cap of 12,000 season tickets sold.

=== Sponsorship ===
Period	Kit manufacturer	Shirt sponsor	Sleeve sponsor
1996–1999	Nike	Honda	—
2000–2002	Nike	Yahoo! Sports	—
2003–2004	Nike	Yahoo! en Español	—
2005	Adidas	—	—
2008	Adidas	—	—
2009–2011	Adidas	Amway Global	—
2012–2015	Adidas	—	—
2016–2018	Adidas	Sutter Health	—
2019	Adidas	—	—
2020	Adidas	Intermedia	Clover; Wells Fargo
2021–2024	Adidas	Intermedia	PayPal
2025–present	Adidas	El Camino Health	Habbas Law

== Broadcasting ==
From 2023, every Earthquakes game will be carried on MLS Season Pass on the Apple TV app, with select national games on Fox or Fox Sports 1. Prior to the streaming deal, the Earthquakes were seen on TV across the Bay Area on a number of stations, with the most recent linear partner being cable outlets NBC Sports Bay Area and NBC Sports California.

On the radio, all Earthquakes games are broadcast in English on 810 KGO (since 2023) and in Spanish on 1370 KZSF (since 2011). The English-language broadcast features Ted Ramey as the play-by-play announcer, and former Earthquakes goalkeeper Joe Cannon as the color analyst. Carlos César Rivera serves as the Spanish-language play-by-play announcer, while former Quakes defender Ramiro Corrales is the analyst.

== Players and staff ==
=== Roster ===
As of November 9, 2026

Note: Flags indicate national team as defined under FIFA eligibility rules; some limited exceptions apply. Players may hold more than one non-FIFA nationality.

No.	Pos.	Nation	Player
1	GK	SCO	Angus Gunn
2	DF	USA	Jamar Ricketts
3	DF	FRA	Paul Marie
4	DF	USA	Dave Romney
5	DF	USA	Daniel Munie
6	MF	USA	Ian Harkes
7	FW	BFA	Ousseni Bouda
9	FW	AUS	Luka Jovanović
10	MF	USA	Niko Tsakiris
11	FW	GER	Timo Werner
14	MF	GBS	Ronaldo Vieira
16	MF	USA	Jack Skahan
17	MF	USA	Jack Jasinski
18	DF	USA	Reid Roberts
19	FW	USA	Preston Judd
20	MF	USA	Nick Fernandez
21	MF	ENG	Noel Buck

No.	Pos.	Nation	Player
22	GK	USA	Nate Crockford
23	MF	GER	Eduard Löwen
24	DF	USA	DeJuan Jones
25	DF	USA	Max Floriani
28	DF	USA	Benji Kikanović
29	MF	USA	Kaedren Spivey
31	GK	USA	Francesco Montali
32	FW	NGR	Nonso Adimabua
34	MF	USA	Beau Leroux
35	MF	USA	Rohan Rajagopal
36	GK	USA	Earl Edwards Jr.
38	MF	USA	Edwyn Mendoza
40	MF	MEX	Jonathan González
79	FW	GRN	Darius Johnson
87	DF	BRA	Vítor Costa
89	GK	MEX	Marcelo Ávalos

=== Out on loan ===
Note: Flags indicate national team as defined under FIFA eligibility rules; some limited exceptions apply. Players may hold more than one non-FIFA nationality.

No.	Pos.	Nation	Player
15	MF	USA	Cruz Medina (on loan to Tapatío)
—	MF	ARG	Hernán López (on loan to Argentinos Juniors)

No.	Pos.	Nation	Player
—	FW	COL	Chicho Arango (on loan to Atlético Nacional)

=== Team management ===
As of June 18, 2026

Coaching staff
President	(United States) Jared Shawlee
General Manager/Head Coach	(United States) Bruce Arena
Assistant Coach	(United States) Dave Sarachan
Assistant Coach	(Grenada) Shalrie Joseph
Assistant Coach	(United States) Steve Ralston
Goalkeeping Coach	(United States) Adin Brown
Head Athletic Trainer	Manny De Alba
Assistant Athletic Trainer	Brendon Taguinod
Assistant Athletic Trainer	Beatriz Olmedo
Equipment Manager	Andy Dunbar
Assistant Manager Equipment	Hector Perez
Team Administrator	Sean Mearns

== Honors ==
=== Domestic ===
- MLS Cup
  - Champions (2): 2001, 2003
- Supporters' Shield
  - Champions (2): 2005, 2012
  - Runners-up (2): 2002, 2003
- Western Conference (Playoff)
  - Champions (1): 2003
- Western Conference (Regular Season)
  - Champions (3): 2003, 2005, 2012
  - Runners-up (2): 2001, 2002
- Eastern Conference (Playoff)
  - Runners-up (1): 2010

== Awards ==
- MLS Fair Play Award: 2001, 2010

=== Player ===
Landon Donovan MVP Award
Name	year
Chris Wondolowski	2012

MLS Defender of the Year Award
Name	year
John Doyle	1996
Jeff Agoos	2001

MLS Goalkeeper of the Year Award
Name	year
Joe Cannon	2002
Pat Onstad	2003
Pat Onstad	2005

MLS Comeback Player of the Year Award
Name	year
Troy Dayak	2001
Brian Ching	2004
Bobby Convey	2010

MLS Golden Boot
Name	year
Chris Wondolowski	2010
Chris Wondolowski	2012

MLS Fair Play Award
Name	year
Ronald Cerritos	2005
Vako	2018

MLS Newcomer of the Year Award
Name	year
Darren Huckerby	2008

MLS Goal of the Year Award
Name	year
Eric Wynalda	1996
Dwayne De Rosario	2004
Dwayne De Rosario	2005

MLS Best XI
Name	year
John Doyle	1996
Ronald Cerritos	1997
Eddie Lewis	1999
Jeff Agoos	2001
Wade Barrett	2002
Ronnie Ekelund	2002
Pat Onstad	2003
Landon Donovan	2003
Brian Ching	2004
Pat Onstad	2005
Danny Califf	2005
Dwayne De Rosario	2005
Chris Wondolowski	2010
Chris Wondolowski	2011
Chris Wondolowski	2012
Víctor Bernárdez	2012

== Record ==
=== Year-by-year ===
This is a partial list of recent seasons completed by the Quakes. For the full season-by-season history, see List of San Jose Earthquakes seasons.

Season	League											Position		Playoffs	USOC	Continental / Other		Average attendance	Top goalscorer(s)	
Season	Div	League	Pld	W	L	D	GF	GA	GD	Pts	PPG	Conf.	Overall	Playoffs	USOC	Continental / Other		Average attendance	Name(s)	Goals
2016	1	MLS	34	8	12	14	32	40	−8	38	1.12	9th	17th	DNQ	R4	DNQ		19,930	(United States) Chris Wondolowski	12
2017	1	MLS	34	13	14	7	39	60	−21	46	1.35	6th	12th	R1	SF	DNQ		19,875	(United States) Chris Wondolowski	15
2018	1	MLS	34	4	21	9	49	71	−22	21	0.62	12th	23rd	DNQ	R4	DNQ		19,032	(Netherlands) Danny Hoesen	12
2019	1	MLS	34	13	16	5	52	55	−3	44	1.29	8th	15th	DNQ	Ro16	DNQ		19,032	(United States) Chris Wondolowski	15
2020	1	MLS	23	8	9	6	35	51	−16	30	1.30	8th	16th	R1	NH	MLS is Back tournament	QF	15,112	(United States) Chris Wondolowski	9
2021	1	MLS	34	10	13	11	46	54	−8	41	1.21	10th	21st	DNQ	NH	DNQ		12,101	(Mexico) Javier Eduardo López	12
2022	1	MLS	34	8	15	11	52	69	−17	35	1.03	14th	26th	DNQ	Ro16	DNQ		12,911	(United States) Jeremy Ebobisse	17
2023	1	MLS	34	10	14	10	39	43	−4	44	1.29	9th	16th	WC	R3	2023 Leagues Cup	GS	18,041	(Argentina) Cristian Espinoza	13
2024	1	MLS	34	6	25	3	41	78	−37	21	0.62	14th	29th	DNQ	Ro16	2024 Leagues Cup	Ro16	18,782	(Norway) Amahl Pellegrino	9
2025	1	MLS	34	11	15	8	60	63	-3	41	1.21	10th	20th	DNQ	QF	DNQ		19,614	(Venezuela) Josef Martínez	14

1. Avg. attendance include statistics from league matches only.
2. Top goalscorer(s) includes all goals scored in league, MLS Cup playoffs, U.S. Open Cup, MLS is Back tournament, CONCACAF Champions League, FIFA Club World Cup, and other competitive continental matches.

=== International tournaments ===
- 2002 CONCACAF Champions' Cup

First round v. (Honduras) Club Deportivo Olimpia: 1–0, 3–1 (Earthquakes advanced 4–1 on aggregate)
Quarter-finals v. (Mexico) C.F. Pachuca: 0–3, 1–0 (Pachuca advanced 3–1 on aggregate)

- 2003 La Manga Cup

Group stage v. (Norway) Rosenborg BK: 0–2
Group stage v. (Russia) FC Rubin Kazan: 1–1
Group stage v. (Norway) Viking FK: 1–3
Seventh-place match v. (Norway) Lyn Oslo: 3–1

- 2003 CONCACAF Champions' Cup

First round v. (Guatemala) C.S.D. Municipal: 2–4, 2–1 (Municipal advanced 5–4 on aggregate)

- 2004 La Manga Cup

Group stage v. (Sweden) GIF Sundsvall: 3–1
Group stage v. (Norway) Stabæk Fotball: 2–1
Semi-finals v. (Norway) Viking FK: 1–1 (Viking Stavanger advanced 5–3 on penalties)
Third-place match v. (Ukraine) FC Dynamo Kyiv: 1–1 (Earthquakes won 6–5 on penalties)

- 2004 CONCACAF Champions' Cup

Quarter-finals v. (Costa Rica) L.D. Alajuelense: 0–3, 1–0 (Alajuelense advanced 3–1 on aggregate)

- 2013–14 CONCACAF Champions League

Group stage v. (Canada) Montreal Impact: 0–1
Group stage v. (Guatemala) Heredia Jaguares de Peten: 0–1
Group stage v. (Canada) Montreal Impact: 3–0
Group stage v. (Guatemala) Heredia Jaguares de Peten: 1–0
Quarterfinals v. (Mexico) Toluca FC: 1–1, 1–1 (Toluca advanced 5–4 on penalties)

== Player records ==
=== Career records ===
Statistics below are for all-time leaders. Statistics are for regular season only. Bold indicates active players.

As of April 10, 2026

Goals
Rank	Player	Years	Goals
1	(United States) Chris Wondolowski	2005, 2009–2021	171
2	(El Salvador) Ronald Cerritos	1997–2001, 2005	61
3	(Argentina) Cristian Espinoza	2019–2025	36
4	(United States) Jeremy Ebobisse	2021–2024	34
5	(United States) Landon Donovan	2001–2004	32
6	(Canada) Dwayne De Rosario	2001–2005	27
7	(Georgia (country)) Valeri Qazaishvili	2017–2020	26
8	(United States) Brian Ching	2003–2005	25
9	(Netherlands) Danny Hoesen	2017–2020	23
10	(United States) Eric Wynalda	1996–1998	21

Assists
Rank	Player	Years	Assists
1	(Argentina) Cristian Espinoza	2019–2025	70
2	(United States) Shea Salinas	2008–2009; 2012–2022	50
3	(El Salvador) Ronald Cerritos	1997–2001, 2005	47
4	(United States) Richard Mulrooney	1999–2004	44
5	(United States) Chris Wondolowski	2005, 2009–2021	40
6	(United States) Eddie Lewis	1996–1999	35
7	(United States) Ramiro Corrales	1996–1997; 2001–2004; 2008–2013	32
8	(Canada) Dwayne De Rosario	2001–2005	31
9	(United States) Landon Donovan	2001–2004	29
9	(United States) Eric Wynalda	1996–1999	29

Shutouts
Rank	Player	Years	Shutouts
1	(United States) Joe Cannon	1999–2002; 2008–2010	44
2	(United States) Jon Busch	2010–2014	36
3	(Canada) Pat Onstad	2003–2005	27
3	(United States) David Bingham	2011–2017	27
5	(United States) JT Marcinkowski	2018–2024	18
6	(Brazil) **Daniel**	2023–2026	16
7	(Argentina) Daniel Vega	2019–2021	10
8	(United States) David Kramer	1997–1999	6
8	(United States) Dave Salzwedel	1996–1997	6
10	(United States) Jon Conway	2000–2005	5

Games played
Rank	Player	Years	Games
1	(United States) Chris Wondolowski	2005, 2009–2021	367
2	(United States) Shea Salinas	2008–2009; 2012–2022	313
3	(United States) Ramiro Corrales	1996–1997; 2001–2004; 2008–2013	250
4	(United States) Tommy Thompson	2014–2024	223
5	(United States) Jackson Yueill	2017–2024	210
6	(Argentina) Cristian Espinoza	2019–2025	205
7	(United States) Joe Cannon	1999–2002; 2008–2010	171
8	(United States) Jason Hernandez	2008–2014	165
9	(United States) Richard Mulrooney	1999–2004	163
10	(Honduras) Victor Bernardez	2012–2017	162

=== Single-season records ===
As of March 26, 2026

Goals
Rank	Player	Season	Goals
1	(United States) Chris Wondolowski	2012	27
2	(United States) Chris Wondolowski	2010	18
3	(United States) Jeremy Ebobisse	2022	17
4	(United States) Chris Wondolowski	2011	16
4	(United States) Chris Wondolowski	2015	16
6	(El Salvador) Ronald Cerritos	1998	15
6	(United States) Chris Wondolowski	2019	15
8	(Ecuador) Ariel Graziani	2002	14
8	(United States) Chris Wondolowski	2014	14
8	(Venezuela) Josef Martínez	2025	14
10	(United States) Paul Bravo	1996	13
10	(United States) Alan Gordon	2012	13
10	(United States) Chris Wondolowski	2017	13
10	(Argentina) Cristian Espinoza	2023	13
10	(Colombia) Cristian Arango	2025	13

Assists
Rank	Player	Season	Assists
1	(United States) Eddie Lewis	1997	14
1	(United States) Eddie Lewis	1999	14
1	(Argentina) Cristian Espinoza	2022	14
1	(Argentina) Cristian Espinoza	2024	14
5	(United States) Eric Wynalda	1996	13
5	(Canada) Dwayne De Rosario	2005	13
5	(Honduras) Marvin Chávez	2012	13
5	(Argentina) Cristian Espinoza	2019	13
9	(El Salvador) Ronald Cerritos	1998	12
9	(Argentina) Cristian Espinoza	2025	12

== Leadership and players ==
=== Hall of Fame ===
Players

- (United States) John Doyle (inducted 2005)
- (El Salvador) Ronald Cerritos (inducted 2010)
- (United States) Troy Dayak (inducted 2011)
- (England) Paul Child (inducted 2012)
- (Socialist Federal Republic of Yugoslavia) Momčilo Gavrić (inducted 2013)
- (Scotland) Johnny Moore (inducted 2014)
- (United States) Ramiro Corrales (inducted 2015)
- (United States) Joe Cannon (inducted 2017)
- (England) Chris Dangerfield (inducted 2018)
- (United States) Jon Busch (inducted 2018)
- (United States) Richard Mulrooney (inducted 2019)

Builders

- (Serbia) Milan Mandarić (inducted 2012)
- (England) Peter Bridgwater (inducted 2013)

Staff

- (United States) Dave Obenour (inducted 2019)
- (Canada) Frank Yallop (inducted 2022)

=== Team captains ===
Name	Years
(United States) John Doyle	1996–2000
(United States) Jeff Agoos	2001–2004
(United States) Wade Barrett	2005
(United States) Nick Garcia	2008
(United States) Ramiro Corrales	2009–2013
(United States) Chris Wondolowski	2014–2021
(United States) Jackson Yueill	2022–2024
(Argentina) Cristian Espinoza	2025
(Guinea-Bissau) Ronaldo Vieira	2026–Present

=== Head coaches ===
Name	Nat	Tenure
Laurie Calloway	England	December 7, 1995 – June 25, 1997
Brian Quinn	Republic of Ireland	June 25, 1997– September 16, 1999
Jorge Espinoza	Chile	September 16, 1999 – September 22, 1999
Lothar Osiander	Germany	September 22, 1999 – January 12, 2001
Frank Yallop	Canada	February 3, 2001 – December 12, 2003
Dominic Kinnear	United States	January 6, 2004 – December 15, 2005
Frank Yallop	Canada	November 9, 2007 – June 7, 2013
Mark Watson	Canada	June 7, 2013 – October 30, 2013 interim October 30, 2013 – October 15, 2014
Ian Russell	United States	October 15, 2014 – October 26, 2014 interim
Dominic Kinnear	United States	October 16, 2014 – June 25, 2017
Chris Leitch	United States	June 25, 2017 – November 24, 2017
Mikael Stahre	Sweden	November 24, 2017 – September 17, 2018
Steve Ralston	United States	September 17, 2018 – October 28, 2018 interim
Matías Almeyda	Argentina	October 29, 2018 – April 18, 2022
Alex Covelo	Spain	April 19, 2022 – January 2, 2023 interim
Luchi Gonzalez	United States	January 3, 2023 – June 23, 2024
Ian Russell	United States	June 24, 2024 – November 6, 2024 interim
Bruce Arena	United States	November 7, 2024 – present

=== General managers (Sporting directors) ===
Nation	Name	Tenure
England	Peter Bridgwater	1995–1998
United States	Lynne Meterparel	1999–2000
United States	Tom Neale	2001
Scotland	Johnny Moore	2002–2003
United States	Alexi Lalas	2004–2005
United States	Kate McAllister and Ken Freccero (interim)	2005
United States	John Doyle	2008–2016
Switzerland	Jesse Fioranelli	2017–2021
United States	Chris Leitch	2021–2025
United States	Bruce Arena	2025–present

== See also ==
- San Jose Earthquakes (1974–88)
- 2007 MLS Expansion Draft
- List of San Jose Earthquakes rosters
