= Peter Bridgwater =

Peter Bridgwater (March 7, 1935 – June 21, 2005) was the first president of the San Jose Clash—later known as the San Jose Earthquakes—Major League Soccer franchise.

A native of England, Bridgwater got his start in association football as a fundraiser and sponsor of Plymouth Argyle F.C. In 1981, former Argyle manager Tony Waiters hired Birdgwater as assistant general manager of the Vancouver Whitecaps of the North American Soccer League. Waiters departed following the 1982 season and Bridgwater replaced him as the team's president and general manager. He was forced to resign in 1983 after it was discovered he had lied on his resume.

In 1984, Bridgwater was named general manager of the NASL's San Jose Earthquakes. Bridgwater purchased the Earthquakes later, but the NASL ceased operations in 1985. After the NASL went under, Bridgwater became a founder of the Western Soccer Alliance, which later became the USL First Division. Soccer America called him "one of the men most responsible for keeping professional outdoor soccer alive [in the U.S.] after the collapse of the North American Soccer League". Bridgwater was also a venue director for the 1994 FIFA World Cup at Stanford Stadium in Palo Alto, California. Two years after the World Cup, the MLS was launched; Bridgwater served as the Clash's first president. He remained the general manager through the 1998 season, and played a role in having San Jose host matches for the 1999 FIFA Women's World Cup.
