= Joel Qwiberg =

Swedish-Colombian retired footballer (born 1992)

Personal information
- Full name: Joel Eduardo Qwiberg
- Date of birth: October 9, 1992 (age 34)
- Place of birth: Bogotá, Colombia
- Height: 1.73 m (5 ft 8 in)
- Position: Left back

Youth career
- –2006: Klintehamns IK
- 2006–2008: FC Gute
- 2008–2010: GIF Sundsvall

Senior career*
Years	Team	Apps	(Gls)
2011	FC Gute	20	(2)
2012–2014	Vasalunds IF	40	(1)
2014	FC Den Bosch	1	(0)
2015	Vasalunds IF	20	(0)
2016–2017	Brommapojkarna	55	(1)
2018	San Jose Earthquakes	5	(0)
2018	→ Reno 1868 (loan)	4	(0)
2019–2020	Örgryte IS	8	(0)
- * Club domestic league appearances and goals

Joel Eduardo Qwiberg (born October 9, 1992) is a Swedish former professional footballer.

== Career ==
=== Sweden ===
Qwiberg's career began in Sweden at FC Gute (youth team Klintehamns ik), in the fourth-tier Division 2 league Södra Svealand. In January 2012, he moved up to the third-tier league in Sweden, Division 1 Norra, to play for Vasalunds IF, where he made 43 appearances and scored two goals. He was loaned to FC Den Bosch, in the Netherlands' second-tier Eerste Divisie, in July 2014, but returned to Vasalunds the following February after recording only one appearance for the Dutch club. Qwiberg played for Vasalunds for one more year, before transferring to Division 1 side IF Brommapojkarna in January 2016.

During his first season at Brommapojkarna, Qwiberg served as part of the league's best defense, posting an average of 0.65 goals per game, and helped the club see both a championship victory and a promotion to Superettan, Sweden's second-tier league, following a 19-1-6 season. In his second season, BP won the championship again and was again promoted, this time to Sweden's top-tier Allsvenskan league. However, Qwiberg would not experience his first season of top-tier football with BP.

=== Major League Soccer ===
On December 1, 2017, the San Jose Earthquakes, of the top-tier American league MLS, announced that they had signed Qwiberg on a free transfer to a multi-year contract. According to a quote by general manager Jesse Fioranelli in the club's statement about his signing, Qwiberg had been "pursued by several first-division clubs in Sweden and other parts of Europe". His signing came shortly after San Jose hired Swedish coach Mikael Stahre from Allsvenskan club BK Häcken in November 2017. He made his MLS debut on 7 April 2018 in a 1-1 draw with the Philadelphia Union, starting the match and playing 58 minutes before substituting out for Shea Salinas.

Qwiberg parted ways with San Jose on March 2, 2019.

==== Reno 1868 FC ====
Qwiberg appeared briefly on loan with San Jose's USL affiliate Reno 1868, starting against San Antonio on May 26, 2018.

=== Back to Sweden ===
On 1 April 2019, Qwiberg returned to Sweden, signing with Örgryte IS on a one-year contract.

== Personal life ==
Qwiberg was born in Colombia but adopted by a Swedish family as a baby. This background was one of the reasons he elected to move his career to the United States in 2018, so that he could be closer to Colombian culture, learn Spanish alongside his Spanish-speaking teammates at San Jose Earthquakes, and become a part of the city's large Hispanic community.

== Statistics ==
As of June 13, 2018

Club	Season	League		Cup		League cup		Total	
Club	Season	Apps	Goals	Apps	Goals	Apps	Goals	Apps	Goals
Vasalund
Vasalund	2012	16	0	0	0	0	0	16	0
Vasalund	2013	15	1	1 (Note: Appearances in Svenska Cupen)	0	0	0	16	1
Vasalund	2014	11	1	0	0	0	0	11	1
Vasalund	2015	20	0	1	0	0	0	21	0
Vasalund	Total	64	2	2	0	0	0	66	2
Den Bosch (loan)
Den Bosch (loan)	2014-2015	1	0	0	0	0	0	1	0
Den Bosch (loan)	Total	1	0	0	0	0	0	1	0
Brommapojkarna
Brommapojkarna	2015	0	0	3	0	0	0	3	0
Brommapojkarna	2016	25	1	3	0	0	0	28	1
Brommapojkarna	2017	30	0	1	0	0	0	31	0
Brommapojkarna	Total	55	1	7	0	0	0	62	1
San Jose
San Jose	2018	1	0	1 (Note: Appearances in U.S. Open Cup)	0	0	0	2	0
San Jose	Total	1	0	1	0	0	0	2	0
Career total		119	3	10	0	0	0	127	3
