= Jesse Fioranelli =

Italian football manager

Fioranelli in 2025 with Al Nassr

Jesse Fioranelli (born 21 November 1979) is a Swiss / Italian football manager. He is a member of the technical staff of manager Stefano Pioli at Serie A club AC Milan. Prior to this role, he was the General Manager of San Jose Earthquakes in MLS.

== Samsunspor ==
Fioranelli was hired by Samsunspor in 2011 as a member of the coaching staff alongside Vladimir Petkovic.

== Lazio ==
Fioranelli was hired by Lazio in 2012 as a member of the coaching staff alongside Vladimir Petkovic as match analyst.

Following the historic Coppa Italia win in 2013 against city rival Roma, Fioranelli was promoted to Head of Analysis and Scouting at the club after Vladimir Petkovic parted ways to join the Swiss National Team.

His third and last season, 2014/15, with Stefano Pioli as manager of Lazio, the team again reached the final of the Coppa Italia, but lost in extra-time to Juventus. The same season, Lazio finished third and qualified for the final play-off round of the UEFA Champions League.

== Roma ==
Approached by Walter Sabatini, sporting director of Roma, Fioranelli joined Roma the following season, 2015/16, with a broader managerial role as a member of the Direzione Sportiva.

In 2016, the Italian Federation, Federazione Italiana Giuoco Calcio, published Fioranelli's dissertation Why invest in Italian Football following his Sports Director accreditation.

== San Jose Earthquakes ==
In January 2017, San Jose Earthquakes announced the hiring of Fioranelli as the team's General Manager. The club announced that they had parted ways with Fioranelli on June 29, 2021.

== AC Milan ==
In July 2022, Fioranelli joined the technical staff of manager Stefano Pioli at Serie A club AC Milan.
