= 2017 San Jose Earthquakes season =

San Jose Earthquakes
2017 season
- Chairman: Earthquakes Soccer, LLC
- Coach: Dominic Kinnear (until June 25); Chris Leitch (from June 25)
- Stadium: Avaya Stadium (Primary); Stanford Stadium (1 League game)
- Major League Soccer: Conference: 6th Overall: 12th
- MLS Cup Playoffs: Knockout Round
- U.S. Open Cup: Semifinals
- California Clásico: 1st (2-1-0)
- Heritage Cup: 2nd (0-1-1)
- Top goalscorer: League: Chris Wondolowski (13); All: Chris Wondolowski (17)
- Highest home attendance: 50,617 (Jul. 1 vs. Los Angeles at Stanford Stadium)
- Lowest home attendance: League: 17,256 (Sep. 27 vs. Chicago Fire); All: 12,524 (Jun. 14 vs. San Francisco Deltas)
- Average home league attendance: League: 19,875; All: 18,769
Home colors	Away colors

The 2017 San Jose Earthquakes season was the club's 35th year of existence, their 20th season in Major League Soccer and their 10th consecutive season in the top-flight of American soccer.

== Current squad ==
=== Roster ===
As of October 23, 2017.

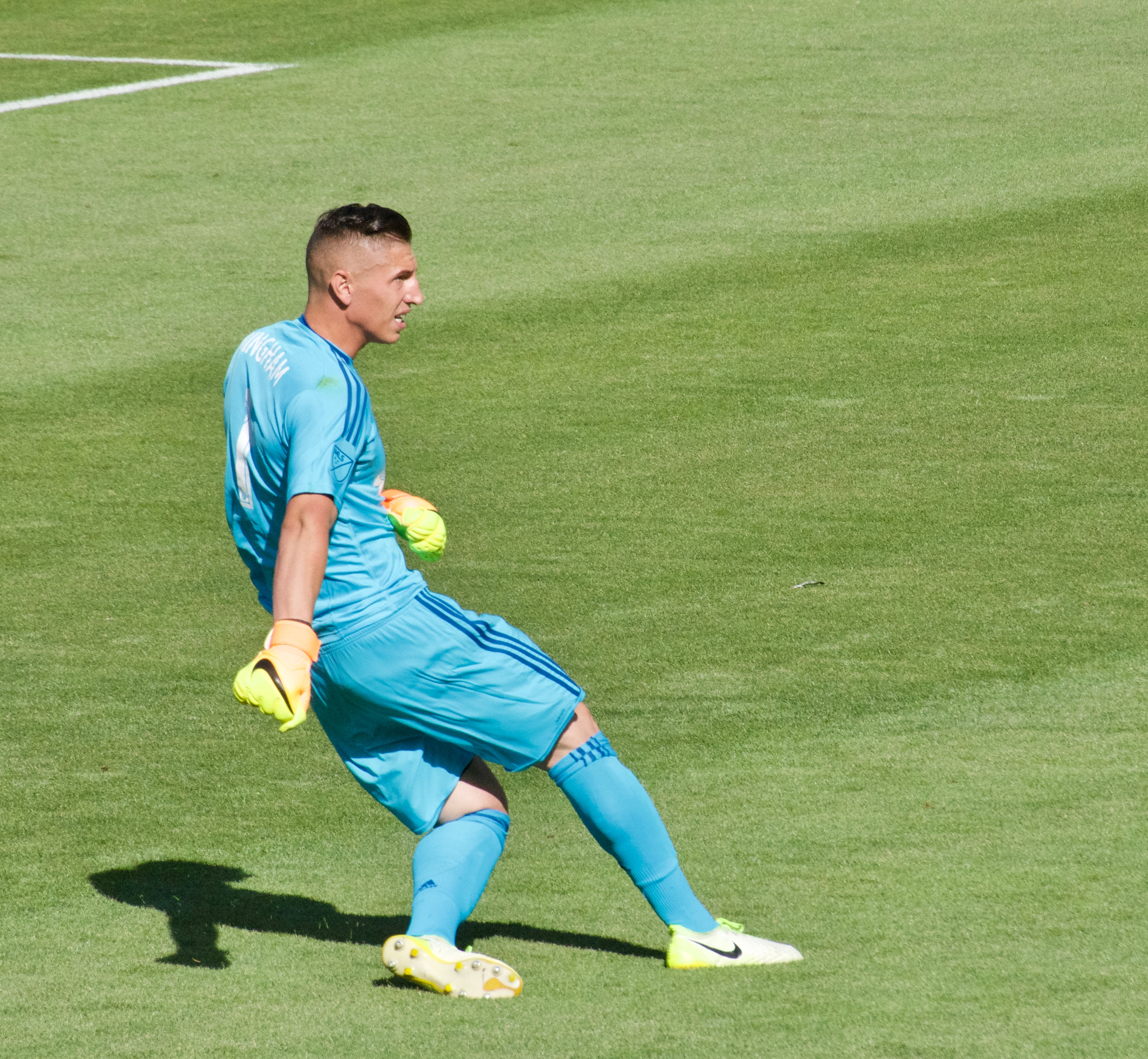
David Bingham signed for San Jose rivals LA Galaxy at the end of the 2017 season.

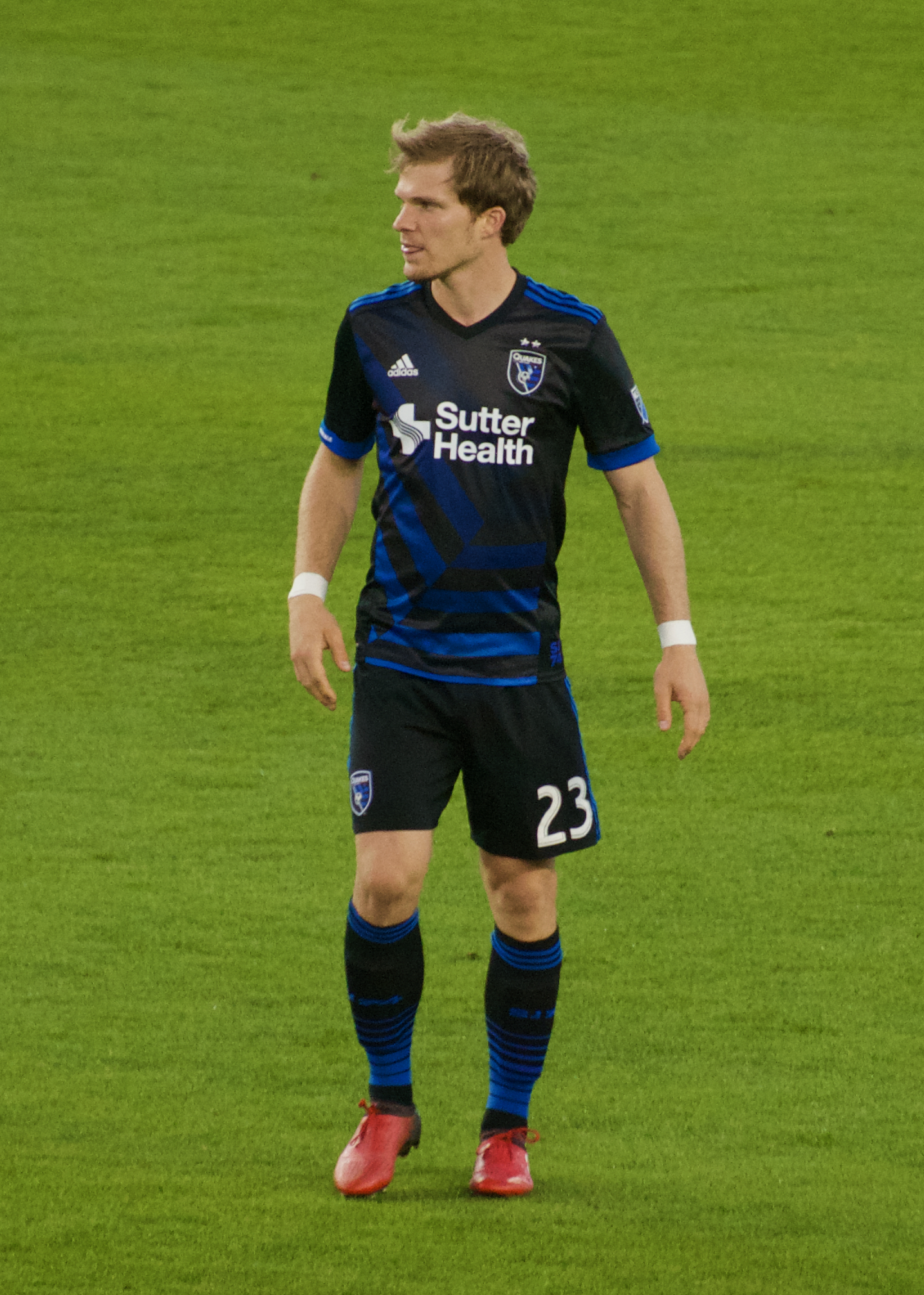
San Jose's 2017 Defensive MVP Florian Jungwirth.

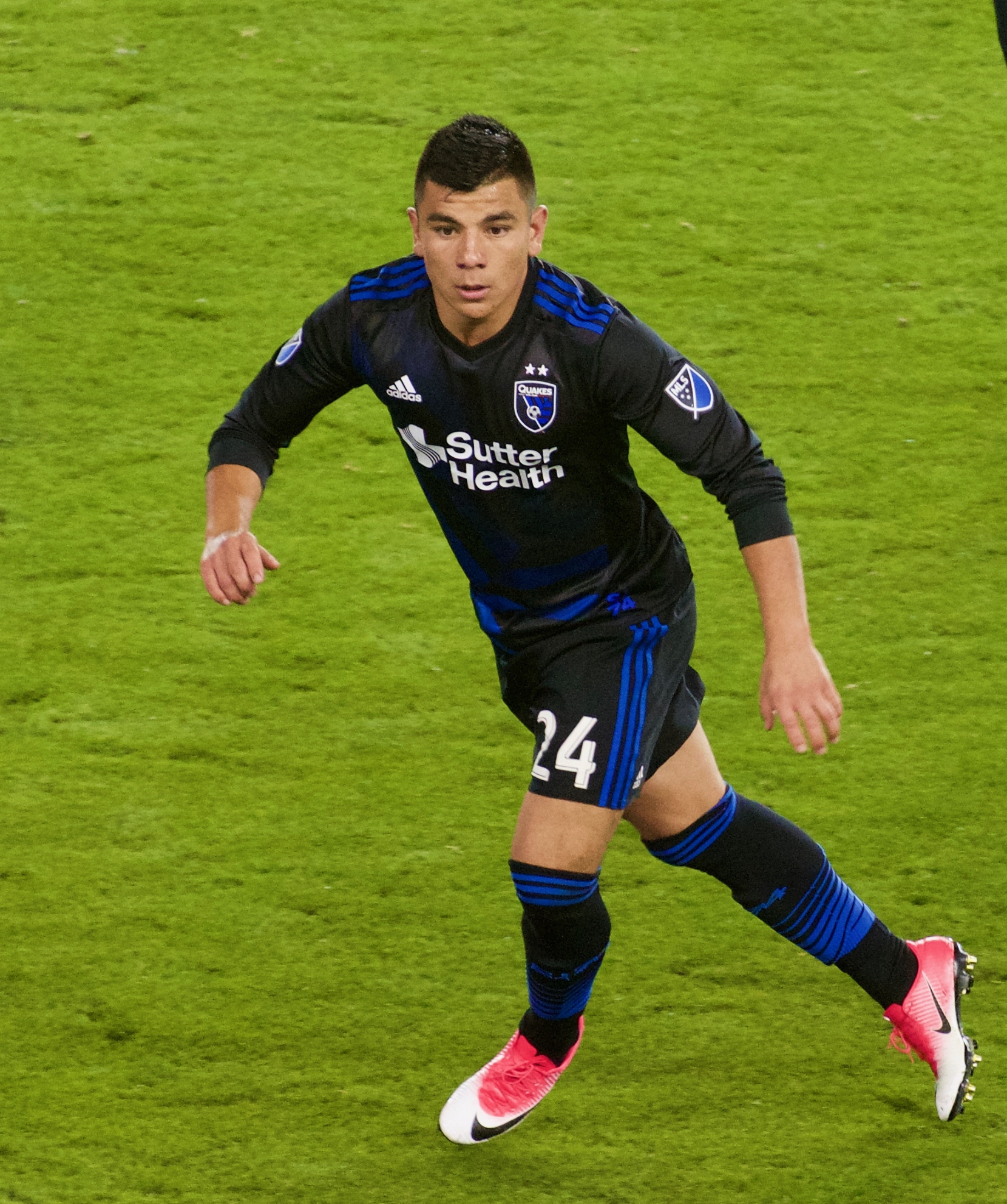
Nick Lima became San Jose's second-ever Homegrown Player in 2017.

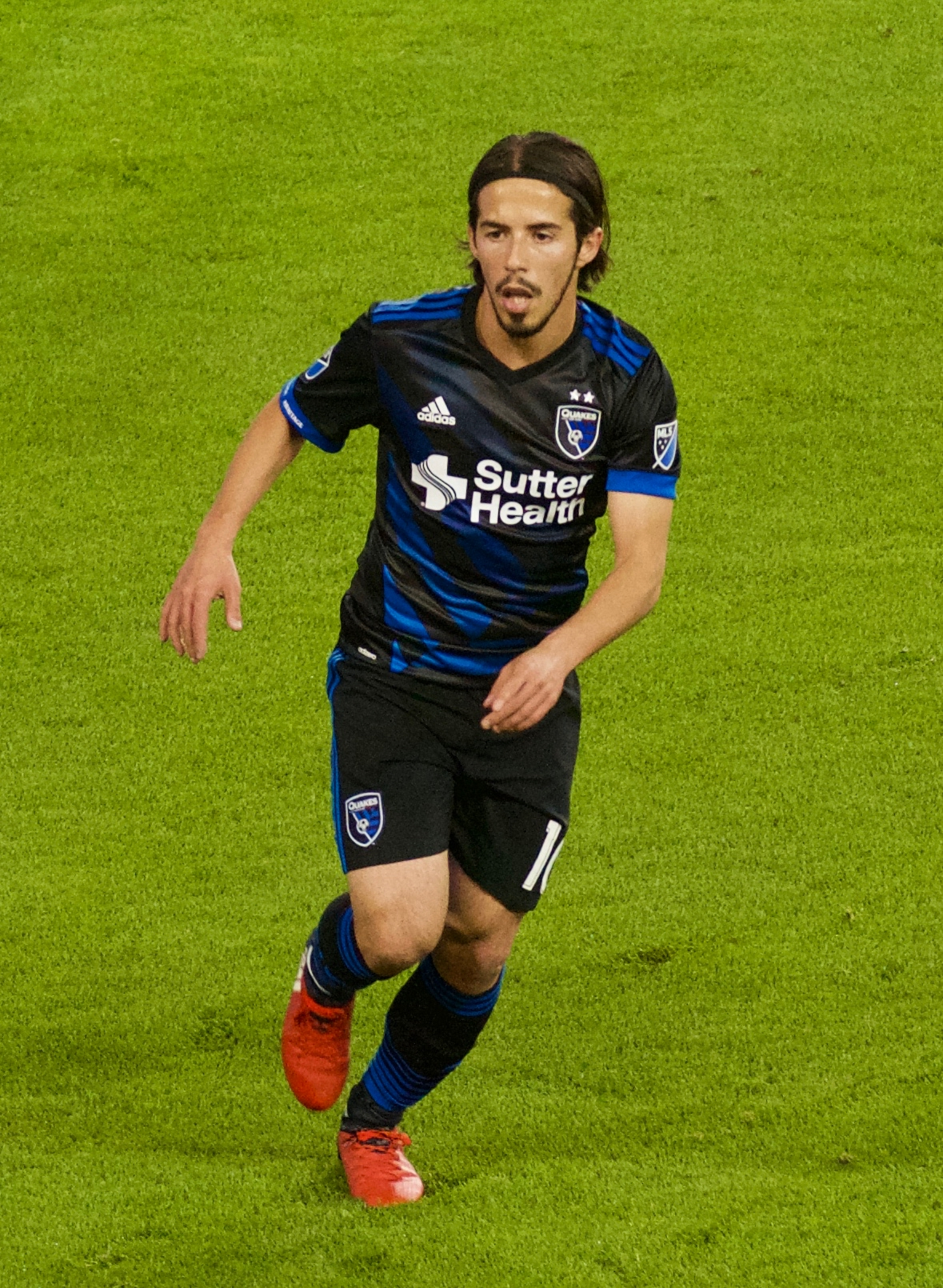
Jahmir Hyka.

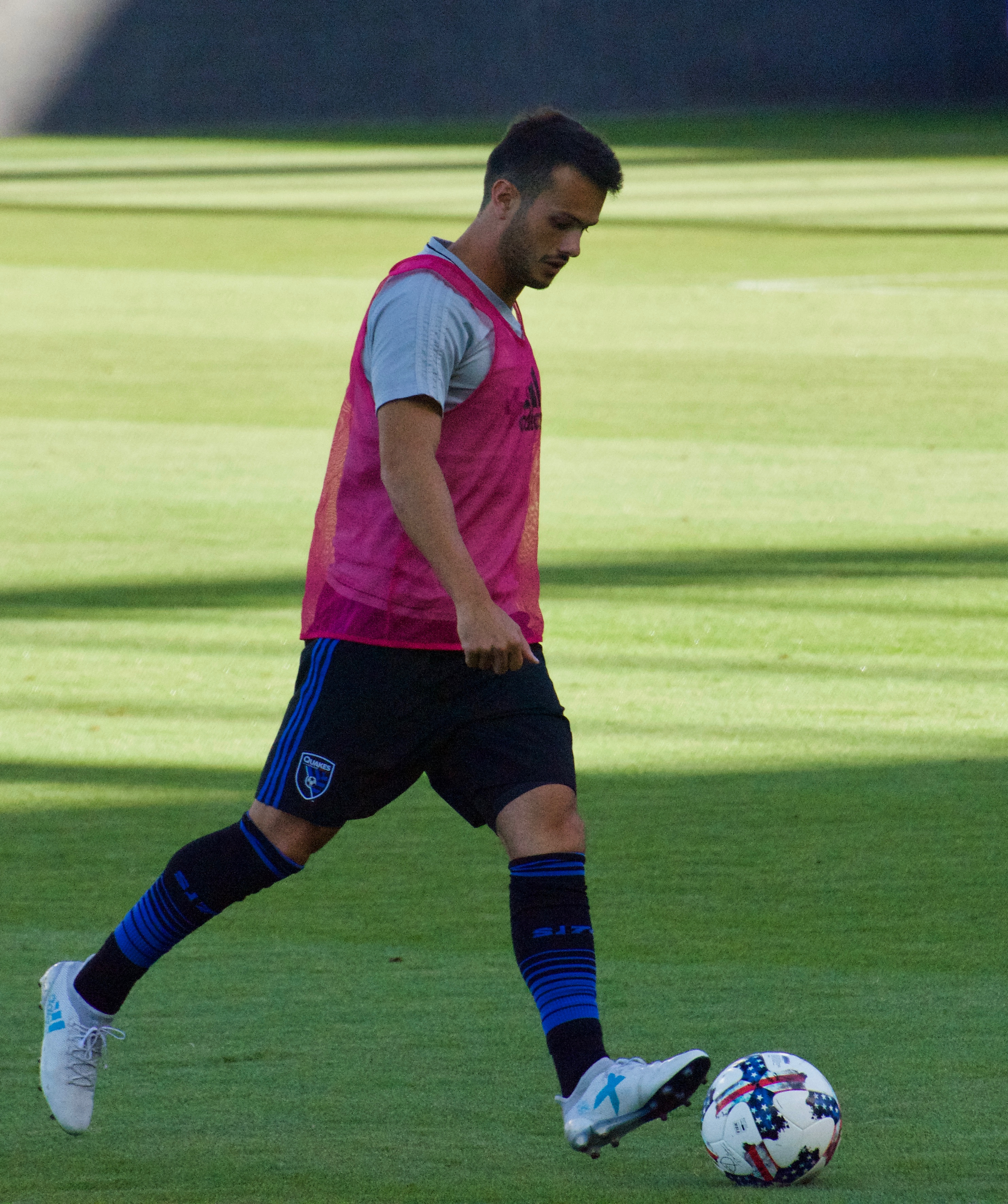
2017 DP signing Vako.

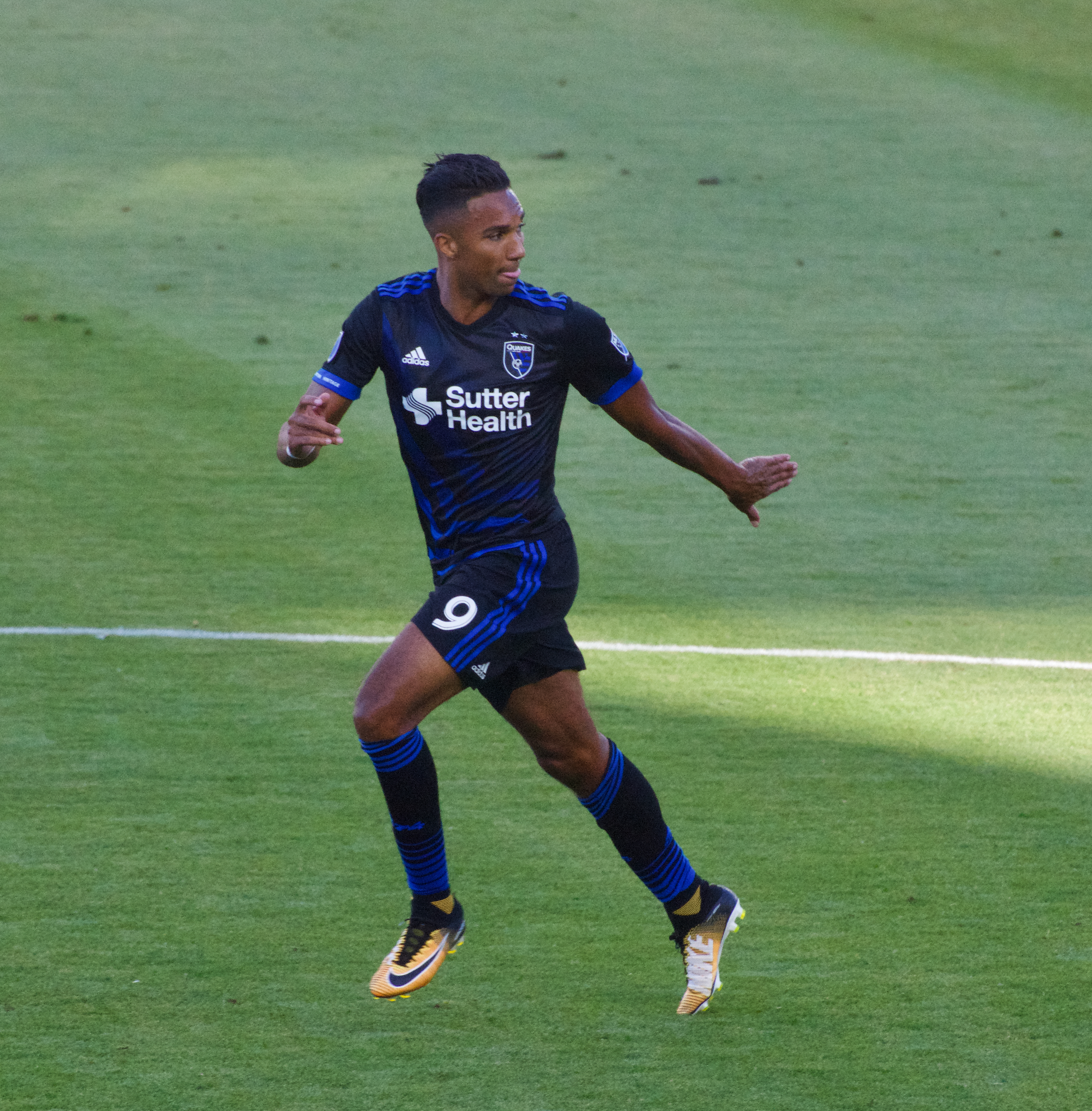
Danny Hoesen was the second highest scorer for the club in 2017, behind Chris Wondolowski.

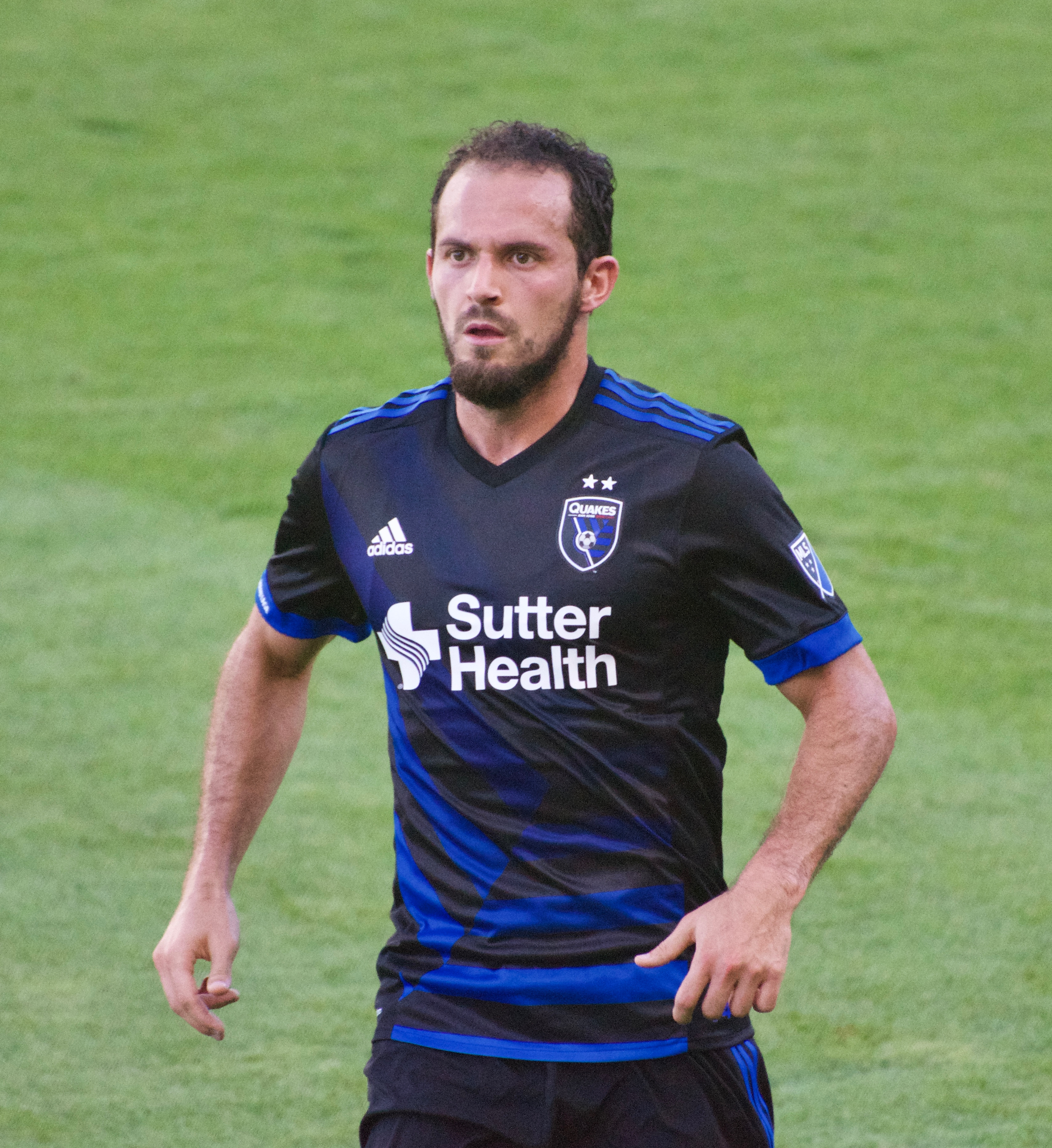
Marco Ureña.

Number	Nat.	Player	Position	Date of birth	Previous club	Appearances	2017 MLS Goals	2017 MLS Assists	Notes
Goalkeepers
1	(United States)	David Bingham	GK	October 19, 1989 (age 36)	(Norway) Strømmen IF	23	7 CS	1	-
12	(United States)	Matt Bersano	GK	September 10, 1992 (age 33)	(United States) Seattle Sounders FC 2	0	-	-	On loan to (United States) Reno 1868 FC
28	(United States)	Andrew Tarbell	GK	October 7, 1993 (age 32)	(United States) Clemson Tigers	11	2 CS	-	Generation Adidas
Defenders
2	(United States)	Kofi Sarkodie	DF	March 22, 1991 (age 34)	(United States) Houston Dynamo	18	-	1	-
3	(Switzerland)	François Affolter	DF	March 13, 1991 (age 34)	(Switzerland) FC Luzern	6	-	-	-
4	(United States)	Marvell Wynne	DF	May 8, 1986 (age 39)	(United States) Colorado Rapids	0	-	-	-
5	(United States)	Víctor Bernárdez	DF	May 24, 1982 (age 43)	(Mexico) Indios (loan from (Belgium) Anderlecht)	25	-	1	Vice-Captain
15	(Argentina)	Andrés Imperiale	DF	July 8, 1986 (age 39)	(Costa Rica) Deportivo Saprissa	13	-	-	-
18	(New Zealand)	Kip Colvey	DF	March 15, 1994 (age 31)	(United States) Cal Poly Mustangs	0	-	-	On loan to (United States) Reno 1868 FC
23	(Germany)	Florian Jungwirth	DF	January 27, 1989 (age 37)	(Germany) Darmstadt 98	30	2	3	-
24	(United States)	Nick Lima	DF	November 17, 1994 (age 31)	(United States) California Golden Bears	22	2	1	Homegrown Player
31	(Panama)	Harold Cummings	DF	March 1, 1992 (age 34)	(Costa Rica) Alajuelense	0	-	-	-
Midfielders
6	(United States)	Shea Salinas	MF	June 24, 1986 (age 39)	(United States) Vancouver Whitecaps FC	25	1	3	-
7	(Trinidad and Tobago)	Cordell Cato	MF	July 15, 1992 (age 33)	(United States) Seattle Sounders FC	15	-	-	-
10	(Albania)	Jahmir Hyka	MF	March 8, 1988 (age 37)	(Switzerland) FC Luzern	30	3	5	-
11	(Georgia (country))	Valeri Qazaishvili	MF	January 29, 1993 (age 33)	(Poland) Legia Warszawa (loan from (Netherlands) Vitesse)	13	5	2	DP
13	(South Africa)	Lindo Mfeka	MF	March 30, 1994 (age 31)	(United States) South Florida Bulls	1	-	-	-
14	(United States)	Jackson Yueill	MF	March 18, 1997 (age 28)	(United States) UCLA Bruins	24	-	1	Generation Adidas
17	(El Salvador)	Darwin Cerén	MF	December 31, 1989 (age 36)	(United States) Orlando City SC	21	-	2	-
22	(United States)	Tommy Thompson	MF	August 15, 1995 (age 30)	(United States) Indiana Hoosiers	32	1	4	Homegrown Player
27	(United States)	Fatai Alashe	MF	October 21, 1993 (age 32)	(United States) Michigan State Spartans	17	-	-	-
30	(Panama)	Aníbal Godoy	MF	February 10, 1990 (age 36)	(Hungary) Honvéd	26	2	-	-
33	(United States)	Marc Pelosi	MF	June 17, 1994 (age 31)	(England) Liverpool	0	-	-	-
38	(Brazil)	Matheus Silva	MF	December 8, 1996 (age 29)	(United States) Montverde Academy	0	-	-	On loan to (United States) Reno 1868 FC
49	(Jamaica)	Simon Dawkins	MF	December 1, 1987 (age 38)	(England) Derby County	7	-	-	DP
Forwards
8	(United States)	Chris Wondolowski	FW	January 28, 1983 (age 43)	(United States) Houston Dynamo	34	13	8	Captain; DP
9	(Netherlands)	Danny Hoesen	FW	January 15, 1991 (age 35)	(Netherlands) FC Groningen	32	5	5	On loan from FC Groningen
21	(Costa Rica)	Marco Ureña	FW	March 5, 1990 (age 36)	(Denmark) Brøndby IF	25	5	1	-
25	(United States)	Quincy Amarikwa	FW	October 29, 1987 (age 38)	(United States) Chicago Fire	9	-	-	-

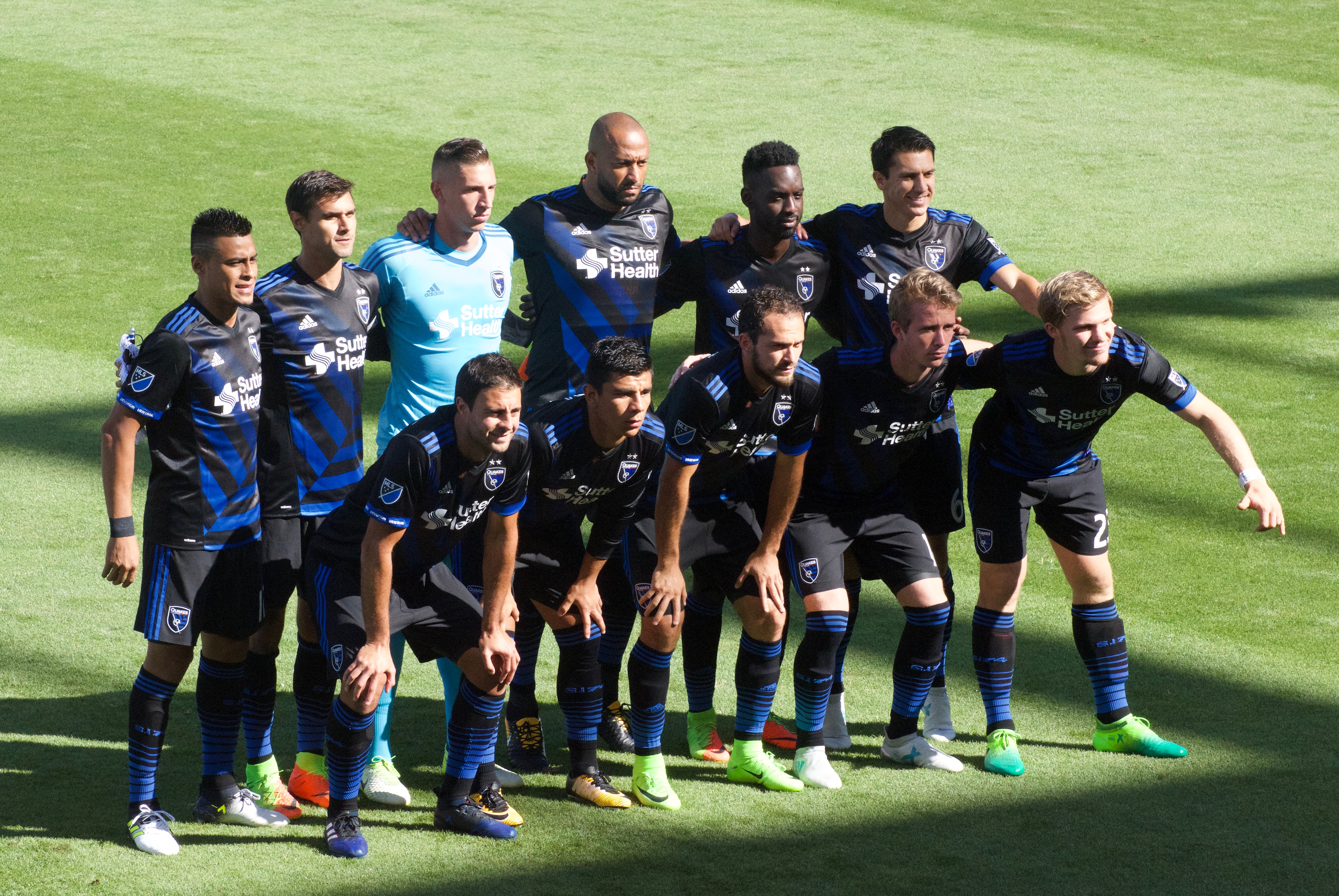
San Jose lining up to play the Colorado Rapids on July 29, 2017. From left to right, top row: Darwin Cerén, Chris Wondolowski, David Bingham, Víctor Bernárdez, Simon Dawkins, and Shea Salinas. Bottom row: Andrés Imperiale, Nick Lima, Marco Ureña, Jackson Yueill, and Florian Jungwirth.

== Non-competitive ==
=== California ===
January 28 Scrimmage	San Jose Earthquakes	3–0	Quakes Academy	San Jose, California
AM PST	Thompson 32'; García 50'; Cerén 71'	Report		Stadium: Earthquakes Training Facility

=== Arizona ===
January 31 Desert Friendlies	San Jose Earthquakes	1–0	Sporting Kansas City	Tucson, Arizona
10:00 PST	Thompson 32'	Report		Stadium: Kino Sports Complex

February 3 Desert Friendlies	San Jose Earthquakes	1–1	Real Salt Lake	Tucson, Arizona
10:00 PST	Wondolowski 32'	Report	Bernárdez 16' (o.g.)	Stadium: Kino Sports Complex

February 7 Desert Friendlies	San Jose Earthquakes	1–0	Seattle Sounders FC	Tucson, Arizona
9:30 PST	Cato 57'	Report		Stadium: Kino Sports Complex

=== Nevada ===
February 11 Friendly	LA Galaxy	0–1	San Jose Earthquakes	Las Vegas, Nevada
19:00 PST		Report	Alashe (yellow card) 84'; García 89'	Stadium: Cashman Field

February 18 Friendly	Reno 1868 FC	0–1	San Jose Earthquakes	Reno, Nevada
12:30 PST	Brown (yellow card) 90'		Thompson 40'; Colvey (yellow card) 90'	Stadium: Greater Nevada Field; Attendance: 6,289

=== California ===
February 25 Friendly	San Jose Earthquakes	4–1	Sacramento Republic FC	San Jose, California
14:00 PST	Salinas 14'; Bernárdez (yellow card) 28'; Godoy (yellow card) 52'; Dawkins 66'; Hyka 79'; Hoesen 90+1'		54' Ochoa; (yellow card) 68' Williams	Stadium: Avaya Stadium

March 22 Friendly	Sacramento Republic FC	Canceled	San Jose Earthquakes	Sacramento, California
19:30 PST				Stadium: Bonney Field

July 14 Friendly	San Jose Earthquakes	4–1	Eintracht Frankfurt	San Jose, California
19:15 PST	Bernárdez 13'; Wondolowski 18' da Costa 61' (o.g.); Amarikwa 75'	Report	Blum 83'	Stadium: Avaya Stadium; Attendance: 14,355

== Competitive ==
=== Major League Soccer ===
==== Standings ====
Western Conference Table

Pos	Team	Pld	W	L	T	GF	GA	GD	Pts	Qualification
4	Houston Dynamo	34	13	10	11	57	45	+12	50	MLS Cup Knockout Round
5	Sporting Kansas City	34	12	9	13	40	29	+11	49	MLS Cup Knockout Round
6	San Jose Earthquakes	34	13	14	7	39	60	−21	46	MLS Cup Knockout Round
7	FC Dallas	34	11	10	13	48	48	0	46	
8	Real Salt Lake	34	13	15	6	48	56	−8	45	

Source: MLS

Overall table

Pos	Team	Pld	W	L	T	GF	GA	GD	Pts	Qualification
10	Houston Dynamo	34	13	10	11	57	45	+12	50	
11	Sporting Kansas City	34	12	9	13	40	29	+11	49	CONCACAF Champions League
12	San Jose Earthquakes	34	13	14	7	39	60	−21	46	
13	FC Dallas	34	11	10	13	48	48	0	46	
14	Real Salt Lake	34	13	15	6	49	55	−6	45	

Source: MLS
Rules for classification: 1) points; 2) total wins; 3) total goal differential; 4) total goals scored; 5) disciplinary points; 6) away goals scored; 7) away goal differential; 8) coin toss or drawing of lots

==== Results ====
March 4 Round 1	San Jose Earthquakes	1–0	Montreal Impact	San Jose, California
19:00 PST	Godoy 17'; Alashe (yellow card) 35'; Salinas (yellow card) 90+2'	Report	Duvall (yellow card) 14'; Camara (yellow card) 45+1' (yellow-red card) 66'; Mancosu (yellow card) 83'	Stadium: Avaya Stadium; Attendance: 18,000; Referee: Baldomero Toledo

March 11 Round 2	San Jose Earthquakes	3–2	Vancouver Whitecaps FC	San Jose, California
19:00 PST	Alashe (yellow card) 7'; Wondolowski 32'; Lima 54'; Godoy 79'	Report	Hurtado 2'; Teibert (yellow card) 15'; Mezquida 17'; Ousted (red card) 23'; Dean (yellow card) 89'	Stadium: Avaya Stadium; Attendance: 18,000; Referee: Drew Fischer

March 18 Round 3	Sporting Kansas City	2–1	San Jose Earthquakes	Kansas City, Kansas
17:30 PDT	Dwyer (yellow card) 16'; Feilhaber 37'; Zusi (yellow card) 84'; Bingham 89' (o.g.)	Report	Ureña (yellow card) 52'; Jungwirth 90+1'	Stadium: Children's Mercy Park; Attendance: 19,282; Referee: Jair Marrufo

April 1 Round 4	New York City FC	2–1	San Jose Earthquakes	New York, New York
11:00 PDT	Harrison 10'; Ring (yellow card) 54'; Wallace (yellow card) 59'; McNamara 67'	Report	Ureña 6'; Bernárdez (red card) 80'	Stadium: Yankee Stadium; Attendance: 20,066; Referee: Jorge González

April 8 Round 5	San Jose Earthquakes	1–1	Seattle Sounders FC	San Jose, California
19:30 PDT	Godoy (yellow card) 33'; Alashe (yellow card) 83'; Wondolowski 90'	Report	Lodeiro (yellow card) 45+1', (goal) 84'	Stadium: Avaya Stadium; Attendance: 18,000; Referee: Ricardo Salazar

April 14 Round 6	San Jose Earthquakes	1–1	FC Dallas	San Jose, California
20:00 PDT	Alashe (yellow card) 83'; Hyka 90+4'	Report	Acosta 78'; Harris (yellow card) 90+2'; González (yellow card) 90+3'	Stadium: Avaya Stadium; Attendance: 18,000; Referee: Armando Villareal

April 19 Round 7	New England Revolution	0–0	San Jose Earthquakes	Foxborough, Massachusetts
16:30 PDT		Report	Godoy (yellow card) 27'; Bingham (yellow card) 85'	Stadium: Gillette Stadium; Attendance: 10,487; Referee: Hilario Grajeda

April 22 Round 8	Houston Dynamo	2–0	San Jose Earthquakes	Houston, Texas
13:00 PDT	Torres 9'; Willis (yellow card) 32'; Elis (yellow card) 34', (goal) 72'; Quioto (yellow card) 90+4'	Report	Jungwirth (yellow card) 35'; Francis (yellow card) 46'	Stadium: BBVA Compass Stadium; Attendance: 16,918; Referee: Allen Chapman

April 29 Round 9	Minnesota United FC	0–1	San Jose Earthquakes	Minneapolis, Minnesota
17:00 PDT	Thiesson (yellow card) 90+3'	Report	Jungwirth 54'; Bingham (yellow card) 87'	Stadium: TCF Bank Stadium; Attendance: 17,605; Referee: Ted Unkel

May 6 Round 10	San Jose Earthquakes	3–0	Portland Timbers	San Jose, California
19:30 PDT	Hyka 8'; Wondolowski 31', 55'	Report	Mattocks (yellow card) 45'; Blanco (yellow card) 66'; Andriuskevicius (yellow card) 90+2'	Stadium: Avaya Stadium; Attendance: 18,000; Referee: Nima Saghafi

May 13 Round 11	Colorado Rapids	3–0	San Jose Earthquakes	Commerce City, Colorado
13:00 PDT	Gashi 29', 56'; Badji 35'; Powers (yellow card) 42'; Miller (yellow card) 55'	Report		Stadium: Dick's Sporting Goods Park; Attendance: 14,567; Referee: Marcos de Oliveira

May 17 Round 12	San Jose Earthquakes	1–1	Orlando City SC	San Jose, California
19:30 PDT	Godoy (yellow card) 44'; Ureña (yellow card) 62'; Lima (yellow card) 68'; Cerén (yellow card) 70'; Wondolowski 83'	Report	Pereira (yellow card) 25'; Rivas 80'	Stadium: Avaya Stadium; Attendance: 18,000; Referee: Drew Fischer

May 20 Round 13	FC Dallas	0–1	San Jose Earthquakes	Frisco, Texas
17:00 PDT	Gruezo (yellow card) 70'	Report	Hyka 81'	Stadium: Toyota Stadium; Attendance: 14,200; Referee: Ismail Elfath

May 27 Round 14	San Jose Earthquakes	2–4	LA Galaxy	San Jose, California
19:00 PDT	Wondolowski 10', (yellow card) 69'; Hoesen 37'	Report	João Pedro 19' dos Santos 35', 64'; Bernárdez 44' (o.g.); Diallo (yellow card) 66'; McInerney (yellow card) 90+4'	Stadium: Avaya Stadium; Attendance: 18,000; Referee: Ricardo Salazar

June 2 Round 15	Portland Timbers	2–0	San Jose Earthquakes	Portland, Oregon
20:00 PDT	Valeri 50', 90+4'; Chará (yellow card) 57'; Guzmán (yellow card) 61'; Miller (yellow card) 70'	Report	Cerén (yellow card) 36' (yellow-red card) 37'	Stadium: Providence Park; Attendance: 21,144; Referee: Kevin Stott

June 17 Round 16	San Jose Earthquakes	0–0	Sporting Kansas City	San Jose, California
18:00 PDT	Godoy (yellow card) 73'; Wondolowski (yellow card) 74'	Report	Besler (yellow card) 78'; Espinoza (yellow card) 86'	Stadium: Avaya Stadium; Attendance: 18,000; Referee: Armando Villarreal

June 24 Round 17	San Jose Earthquakes	2–1	Real Salt Lake	San Jose, California
19:30 PDT	Hoesen 13'; Imperiale (yellow card) 50'; Ureña 68'; Lima (yellow card) 67' (yellow-red card) 71'	Report	Saucedo (yellow card) 89'; Hernández 90+4'	Stadium: Avaya Stadium; Attendance: 18,000; Referee: Fotis Bazakos

July 1 Round 18	San Jose Earthquakes	2–1	LA Galaxy	Stanford, California
19:30 PDT	Wondolowski 75'; Salinas 90+3', (yellow card) 90+4'	Report	Van Damme 11', (yellow card) 84' (yellow-red card) 90+5'; João Pedro (yellow card) 90'	Stadium: Stanford Stadium; Attendance: 50,617; Referee: Allen Chapman

July 4 Round 19	Atlanta United FC	4–2	San Jose Earthquakes	Atlanta, Georgia
16:00 PDT	Walkes (yellow card) 15', (goal) 81'; Carmona (yellow card) 42', (goal) 55'; González Pírez (yellow card) 45'; Martínez 65', 89', (yellow card) 90'; Larentowicz (yellow card) 74'	Report	Thompson 2'; Bingham (yellow card) 18'; Sarkodie (yellow card) 10' (yellow-red card) 32'; Wondolowski 66'; Bernárdez (red card) 90+3'	Stadium: Bobby Dodd Stadium; Attendance: 44,974; Referee: José Carlos Rivero

July 19 Round 20	New York Red Bulls	5–1	San Jose Earthquakes	Harrison, New Jersey
16:30 PDT	Royer (yellow card) 24', (goal) 90', 90+1'; Davis 38'; Kljestan 73'; Felipe 75'	Report	Imperiale (yellow card) 63'; Qazaishvili 88'	Stadium: Red Bull Arena; Attendance: 17,392; Referee: Fotis Bazakos

July 23 Round 21	Seattle Sounders FC	3–0	San Jose Earthquakes	Seattle, Washington
19:00 PDT	Roldan 54', 56'; Leerdam 65'	Report	Yueill (yellow card) 57'; Godoy (yellow card) 60'; Imperiale (yellow card) 87'	Stadium: CenturyLink Field; Attendance: 43,528; Referee: Alan Kelly

July 29 Round 22	San Jose Earthquakes	1–0	Colorado Rapids	San Jose, California
19:30 PDT	Lima 59'; Imperiale (yellow card) 77'	Report	da Fonte (yellow card) 37'	Stadium: Avaya Stadium; Attendance: 18,000; Referee: Hilario Grajeda

August 5 Round 23	San Jose Earthquakes	2–1	Columbus Crew SC	San Jose, California
19:30 PDT	Ureña 42'; Wondolowski 56'; Salinas (yellow card) 90+1'	Report	Mensah (yellow card) 26'; Jahn 76'	Stadium: Avaya Stadium; Attendance: 18,000; Referee: Alan Kelly

August 12 Round 24	Houston Dynamo	3–0	San Jose Earthquakes	Houston, Texas
18:00 PDT	Elis 21', (yellow card) 39'; García (yellow card) 50'; Sánchez 86'; Manotas 90+4'	Report	Imperiale (yellow card) 48'; Alashe (yellow card) 59'	Stadium: BBVA Compass Stadium; Attendance: 16,344; Referee: Ricardo Salazar

August 19 Round 25	San Jose Earthquakes	2–2	Philadelphia Union	San Jose, California
19:30 PDT	Qazaishvili 3'; Jungwirth (yellow card) 13'; Godoy (yellow card) 34'; Thompson (yellow card) 73'; Wondolowski (yellow card) 83', (goal) 90+5' (pen.)	Report	Elliott 35'; Alberg 55'; Bedoya (yellow card) 74'; Gaddis (yellow card) 90+1'	Stadium: Avaya Stadium; Attendance: 18,000; Referee: Ted Unkel

August 23 Round 26	Real Salt Lake	4–0	San Jose Earthquakes	Sandy, Utah
19:00 PDT	Mulholland (yellow card) 24'; Silva 29'; Beckerman (yellow card) 60'; Savarino 68'; Rusnák 80'; Movsisyan 90+3'	Report	Affolter (yellow card) 31'; Godoy (yellow card) 33' (yellow-red card) 61'	Stadium: Rio Tinto Stadium; Attendance: 17,460; Referee: Silviu Petrescu

August 27 Round 27	LA Galaxy	0–3	San Jose Earthquakes	Carson, California
16:00 PDT	Diallo (yellow card) 45'; Smith (red card) 57'	Report	Alashe (yellow card) 20'; Qazaishvili 45+3'; Ureña 80'; Hoesen (yellow card) 87'; Wondolowski 90+2'	Stadium: StubHub Center; Attendance: 19,237; Referee: Chris Penso

September 9 Round 28	Toronto FC	4–0	San Jose Earthquakes	Toronto, Ontario
14:00 PDT	Vázquez 26'; Altidore 48', 64'; Osorio 66'	Report	Godoy (yellow card) 43'; Ureña (yellow card) 57'; Cerén (red card) 72'	Stadium: BMO Field; Attendance: 29,050; Referee: José Carlos Rivero

September 16 Round 29	San Jose Earthquakes	1–0	Houston Dynamo	San Jose, California
19:30 PDT	Hoesen 33'; Sarkodie (yellow card) 36'; Imperiale (yellow card) 86'	Report	Martínez (yellow card) 53'; Elis (yellow card) 81'; DeLaGarza (yellow card) 90+1'	Stadium: Avaya Stadium; Attendance: 18,000; Referee: Alan Kelly

September 23 Round 30	D.C. United	4–0	San Jose Earthquakes	Washington, D.C.
16:00 PDT	Mullins 57', 60', 68', 88'	Report	Jungwirth (yellow card) 50'; Imperiale (yellow card) 67'	Stadium: RFK Stadium; Attendance: 25,229; Referee: Marcos de Oliveira

September 27 Round 31	San Jose Earthquakes	1–4	Chicago Fire	San Jose, California
19:30 PDT	Jungwirth (yellow card) 35'; Godoy (yellow card) 39'; Yueill (yellow card) 67'; Wondolowski 87'	Report	Mihailovic 14'; Álvarez (yellow card) 26'; Solignac 40'; Nikolić 48', 65'	Stadium: Avaya Stadium; Attendance: 17,256; Referee: Drew Fischer

September 30 Round 32	San Jose Earthquakes	2–1	Portland Timbers	San Jose, California
19:30 PDT	Qazaishvili 16'; Hoesen 49'; Bernárdez (yellow card) 56'	Report	Andriuskevicius (yellow card) 71'; Blanco 87'	Stadium: Avaya Stadium; Attendance: 18,000; Referee: Kevin Stott

October 15 Round 33	Vancouver Whitecaps FC	1–1	San Jose Earthquakes	Vancouver, British Columbia
14:00 PDT	Reyna 29'	Report	Qazaishvili 77'	Stadium: BC Place; Attendance: 22,120; Referee: Ismail Elfath

October 22 Round 34	San Jose Earthquakes	3–2	Minnesota United FC	San Jose, California
13:00 PDT	Hoesen 15'; Wondolowski 55'; Godoy (yellow card) 68'; Ureña 90+3'	Report	Ibson (yellow card) 23'; Thiesson 36'; Warner (yellow card) 40'; Danladi (yellow card) 76'; Calvo 81'	Stadium: Avaya Stadium; Attendance: 18,000; Referee: Hilario Grajeda

==== MLS Cup Playoffs ====
October 25, 2017 Knockout Round	Vancouver Whitecaps FC	5–0	San Jose Earthquakes	Vancouver, British Columbia
7:30 PM PDT	Montero 33'; Techera 57'; Waston 64'; Mezquida 78', 80'	Report	Cerén (yellow card) 76'; Godoy (yellow card) 85'	Stadium: BC Place; Attendance: 21,083; Referee: José Carlos Rivero

=== U.S. Open Cup ===
Win Draw Loss Upcoming fixture

June 14, 2017 4	San Jose Earthquakes	2–0	San Francisco Deltas	San Jose, California
19:30 PDT	Yueill 4'; Cato 6'; Dawkins (yellow card) 23'; Imperiale (yellow card) 48'; Bernárdez (yellow card) 57'; Wondolowski (yellow card) 84'	Report	Teijsse (yellow card) 63'; Bekker (yellow card) 69'; Attakora (yellow card) 86'	Stadium: Avaya Stadium; Attendance: 12,524; Referee: Victor Rivas

June 28, 2017 Round of 16	San Jose Earthquakes	2–1	Seattle Sounders FC	San Jose, California
19:30 PDT	Salinas 6'; Hoesen 84'; Godoy (yellow card) 90+2'	Report	Narbón (red card) 35'; Kovar 48'; Bruin (yellow card) 82'	Stadium: Avaya Stadium; Attendance: 13,442; Referee: Nima Saghafi

July 10, 2017 Quarterfinals	San Jose Earthquakes	3–2	LA Galaxy	San Jose, California
19:30 PDT	Wondolowski 16', 51'; Hoesen 62'; Sarkodie (yellow card) 90+2'	Report	Van Damme 3'; Villarreal (yellow card) 28'; McBean (yellow card) 64'; Garcia (yellow card) 70'; Tarbell 84' (o.g.)	Stadium: Avaya Stadium; Attendance: 14,056; Referee: Allen Chapman

August 9, 2017 Semifinals	Sporting Kansas City	1–1 (a.e.t.) (5–4 p)	San Jose Earthquakes	Kansas City, Kansas
17:30 PDT	Rubio 32'	Report	Hoesen 4'; Cerén (yellow card) 74'; Affolter (yellow card) 92'; Imperiale (yellow card) 111'	Stadium: Children's Mercy Park; Attendance: 16,193; Referee: Nima Saghafi
	Penalties
	Feilhaber (penalty missed); Rubio (penalty scored); Ilie (penalty scored); Medranda (penalty scored); Sallói (penalty scored); Besler (penalty scored)		(penalty missed) Wondolowski; (penalty scored) Imperiale; (penalty scored) Cerén; (penalty scored) Qazaishvili; (penalty scored) Jungwirth; (penalty missed) Bernárdez

== Player statistics ==
=== Top scorers ===
Place	Position	Number	Name	MLS	MLS Cup	Open Cup	Total
1	FW	8	(United States) Chris Wondolowski	13	0	2	15
2	FW	9	(Netherlands) Danny Hoesen	5	0	3	8
3	MF	11	(Georgia (country)) Valeri Qazaishvili	5	0	0	5
3	FW	21	(Costa Rica) Marco Ureña	5	0	0	5
5	MF	10	(Albania) Jahmir Hyka	3	0	0	3
6	MF	30	(Panama) Aníbal Godoy	2	0	0	2
6	DF	23	(Germany) Florian Jungwirth	2	0	0	2
6	DF	24	(United States) Nick Lima	2	0	0	2
6	MF	6	(United States) Shea Salinas	1	0	1	2
10	MF	7	(Trinidad and Tobago) Cordell Cato	0	0	1	1
10	MF	22	(United States) Tommy Thompson	1	0	0	1
10	MF	14	(United States) Jackson Yueill	0	0	1	1
Total				39	0	8	47

As of 22 October 2017.

== Player movement ==
=== In ===
Per Major League Soccer and club policies terms of the deals do not get disclosed.

Date	Player	Position	Previous club	Notes	Ref
12/22/16	(Colombia) Olmes García	Forward	(United States) Real Salt Lake	Waiver Draft; Acquired rights (not signed)	
12/21/16	(United States) Nick Lima	Defender	(United States) California Golden Bears	Homegrown Player	
1/7/16	(Panama) Harold Cummings	Defender	(Costa Rica) LD Alajuelense	Undisclosed	
1/27/17	(Costa Rica) Marco Ureña	Forward	(Denmark) Brøndby IF	Targeted Allocation Money	
2/2/17	(Germany) Florian Jungwirth	Defender	(Germany) SV Darmstadt 98	Targeted Allocation Money	
2/3/17	(Albania) Jahmir Hyka	Midfielder	(Switzerland) FC Luzern	Targeted Allocation Money	
6/22/17	(Georgia (country)) Valeri Qazaishvili	Midfielder	(Netherlands) SBV Vitesse	Designated Player	
7/21/2017	(Switzerland) François Affolter	Defender	(Switzerland) FC Luzern	Free transfer	

=== Out ===
Date	Player	Position	Destination Club	Notes	Ref
10/27/16	(United States) Chad Barrett	Forward	(United States) Real Salt Lake	Option Declined, Free Agent	
12/02/16	(United States) Bryan Meredith	Goalkeeper	(United States) Seattle Sounders FC	Option Declined, Free Agent	
12/02/16	(Eritrea) Henok Goitom	Forward	(Sweden) AIK Fotboll	Option Declined	
12/02/16	(Switzerland) Innocent Emeghara	Forward	(Cyprus) Ermis Aradippou FC	Option Declined	
12/02/16	(United States) Steven Lenhart	Forward	(Japan) FC Imabari	Option Declined	
12/02/16	(United States) Mark Sherrod	Forward		Option Declined	
12/15/16	(England) Jordan Stewart	Defender	(United States) Phoenix Rising FC	Out of Contract	
	(Panama) Alberto Quintero	Midfielder	(Peru) Universitario	Loan ended	
7/13/17	(Jamaica) Shaun Francis	Defender	(Canada) Montreal Impact	Trade	

=== Loans ===
Per Major League Soccer and club policies terms of the deals do not get disclosed.

==== In ====
Date	Player	Position	Loaned from	Notes	Ref
2/2/17	(Netherlands) Danny Hoesen	Forward	(Netherlands) FC Groningen	Season long loan; Targeted Allocation Money	

==== Draft picks ====
Draft picks are not automatically signed to the team roster. Only those who are signed to a contract will be listed as transfers in.

Date	Player	Number	Position	Previous club	Notes	Ref
January 13, 2017	Jackson Yueill		MF	(United States) UCLA	MLS SuperDraft 1st Round Pick (#6)	
January 13, 2017	Lindo Mfeka		MF	(United States) University of South Florida	MLS SuperDraft 2nd Round Pick (#28)	
January 17, 2017	Christian Thierjung		FW	(United States) University of California, Berkeley	MLS SuperDraft 3rd Round Pick (#50)	
January 17, 2017	Auden Schilder		GK	(United States) University of Washington	MLS SuperDraft 4th Round Pick (#72)	
