= Jackson Yueill =

American soccer player (born 1997)

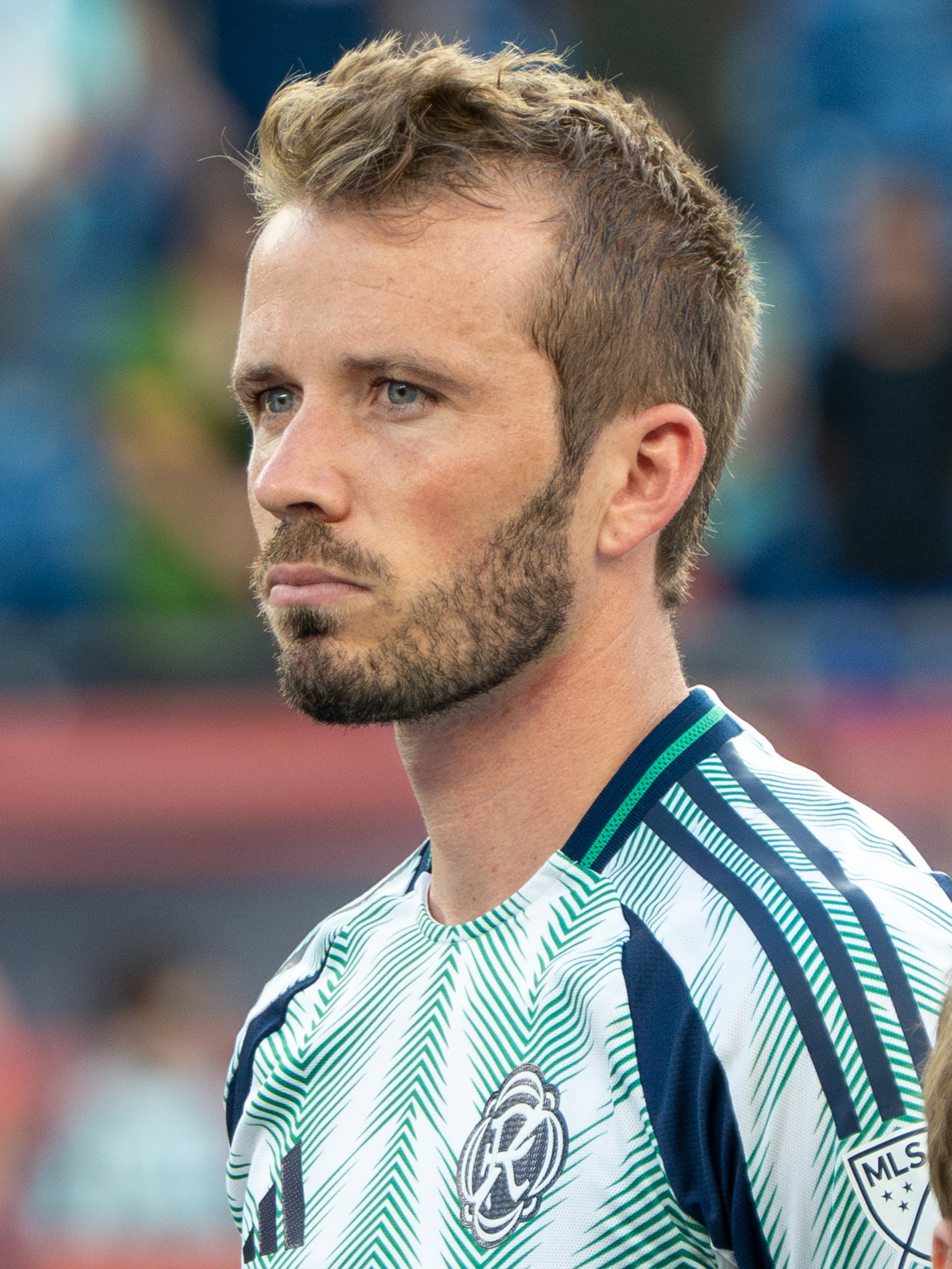
- Yueill with the New England Revolution in 2025

Personal information
- Full name: Jackson William Yueill
- Date of birth: March 19, 1997 (age 29)
- Place of birth: Bloomington, Minnesota, United States
- Height: 5 ft 10 in (1.78 m)
- Position: Midfielder

Team information
- Current team: New England Revolution
- Number: 14

Youth career
- Minnesota Thunder

College career
Years	Team	Apps	(Gls)
2015–2016	UCLA Bruins	40	(9)

Senior career*
Years	Team	Apps	(Gls)
2017–2024	San Jose Earthquakes	210	(13)
2017–2018	→ Reno 1868 (loan)	7	(0)
2025–	New England Revolution	3	(0)

International career^{‡}
2014–2015	United States U18	2	(0)
2016	United States U20	3	(0)
2019–2021	United States U23	6	(2)
2019–2021	United States	16	(0)
Medal record
Representing United States
Men's soccer
CONCACAF Nations League
Winner	2021 United States
CONCACAF Gold Cup
Winner	2021
- * Club domestic league appearances and goals as of March 10, 2025 ‡ National team caps and goals as of December 18, 2021

Jackson William Yueill (/ˈjuːl/; born March 19, 1997) is an American professional soccer player who plays as a midfielder for Major League Soccer club New England Revolution.

== Early life ==
Jackson Yueill grew up in Bloomington, Minnesota where he played youth soccer for Ramalynn Academy as well as Bloomington Jefferson, where he helped lead the Jaguars to the State Soccer Tournament as a freshman.

=== College ===
Yueill played two years of college soccer at UCLA between 2015 and 2016, where he was named NSCAA First Team All-Far West Region and First Team All-Pac-12 Conference both years.

Yueill left college after the 2016 to sign a Generation Adidas contract with Major League Soccer.

== Club career ==
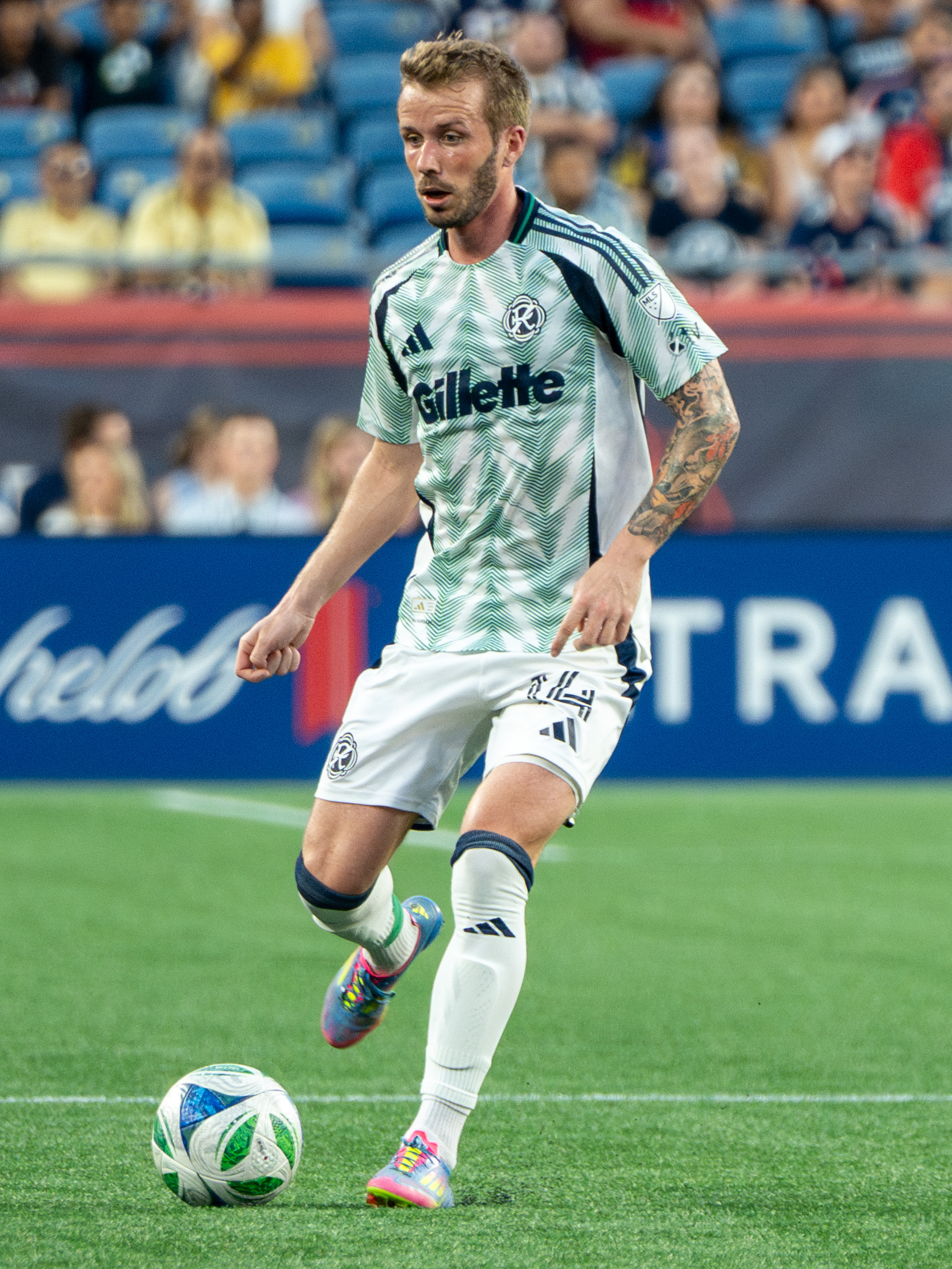
Jackson Yueill with the NE Revolution in 2025

=== San Jose Earthquakes ===
On January 13, 2017, Yueill was selected sixth overall in the 2017 MLS SuperDraft by San Jose Earthquakes. Yueill made his professional debut on March 25, 2017, while on loan to San Jose's United Soccer League affiliate Reno 1868, starting in a 2–0 loss to Orange County SC. He scored his first professional goal in the fourth round of the 2017 U.S. Open Cup in a 2–0 victory over the San Francisco Deltas at Avaya Stadium.

This performance was followed by Yueill's Major League Soccer debut as a 75th-minute substitute in a scoreless home draw against Sporting Kansas City on June 17, 2017. His first MLS start came at Stanford Stadium on July 1 in a 2–1 victory over the LA Galaxy. Yueill was one of two Earthquakes players, the other being Nick Lima, nominated on October 14, 2017, for the MLS Rookie of the Year Award.

=== New England Revolution ===
On December 18, 2024, Yueill signed a three-year deal as a free agent with New England Revolution ahead of their 2025 season. Yueill made his Revolution debut, and recorded his first start for the Revolution, in the 2025 season opener, a 0-0 draw against Nashville SC on February 22.

== International career ==
Yueill received his first call up for the United States U-23 national team in March 2019, featuring in matches against Egypt and the Netherlands. Yueill received his first ever call up to the senior United States squad on June 1, 2019. He was the only player selected that was not on the team's provisional 2019 Gold Cup roster. He made his senior debut on June 5, 2019, in a friendly against Jamaica.

== Career statistics ==
=== Club ===
As of match played October 31, 2024

Club	Season	League			National cup		Playoffs		Other		Total	
Club	Season	Division	Apps	Goals	Apps	Goals	Apps	Goals	Apps	Goals	Apps	Goals
San Jose Earthquakes	2017	MLS	13	0	4	1	1	0	—		18	1
San Jose Earthquakes	2018	MLS	21	0	1	0	—		—		22	0
San Jose Earthquakes	2019	MLS	32	3	1	0	—		—		33	3
San Jose Earthquakes	2020	MLS	21 (Note: Includes three appearances in MLS is Back Tournament group stage)	1	—		1	0	2 (Note: Appearances in MLS is Back Tournament knockout stage)	0	24	1
San Jose Earthquakes	2021	MLS	29	3	—		—		—		29	3
San Jose Earthquakes	2022	MLS	31	4	2	0	—		—		33	4
San Jose Earthquakes	2023	MLS	31	1	1	0	1	0	2 (Note: Appearance(s) in Leagues Cup)	0	35	1
San Jose Earthquakes	2024	MLS	32	1	2	0	—		4	1	38	2
San Jose Earthquakes	Total		210	13	11	1	3	0	8	1	232	15
Reno 1868 (loan)	2017	USL	6	0	—		—		—		6	0
Reno 1868 (loan)	2018	USL	1	0	—		—		—		1	0
Reno 1868 (loan)	Total		7	0	—		—		—		7	0
New England Revolution	2025	MLS	0	0	0	0	0	0	—		0	0
Career total			217	13	11	1	3	0	8	1	239	15

=== International ===
As of December 18, 2021

National team	Year	Apps	Goals
United States	2019	6	0
United States	2020	2	0
United States	2021	8	0
Total		16	0

Source: US Soccer

== Honors ==
United States

- CONCACAF Gold Cup: 2021
- CONCACAF Nations League: 2019–20
