= Florian Jungwirth =

German footballer (born 1989)

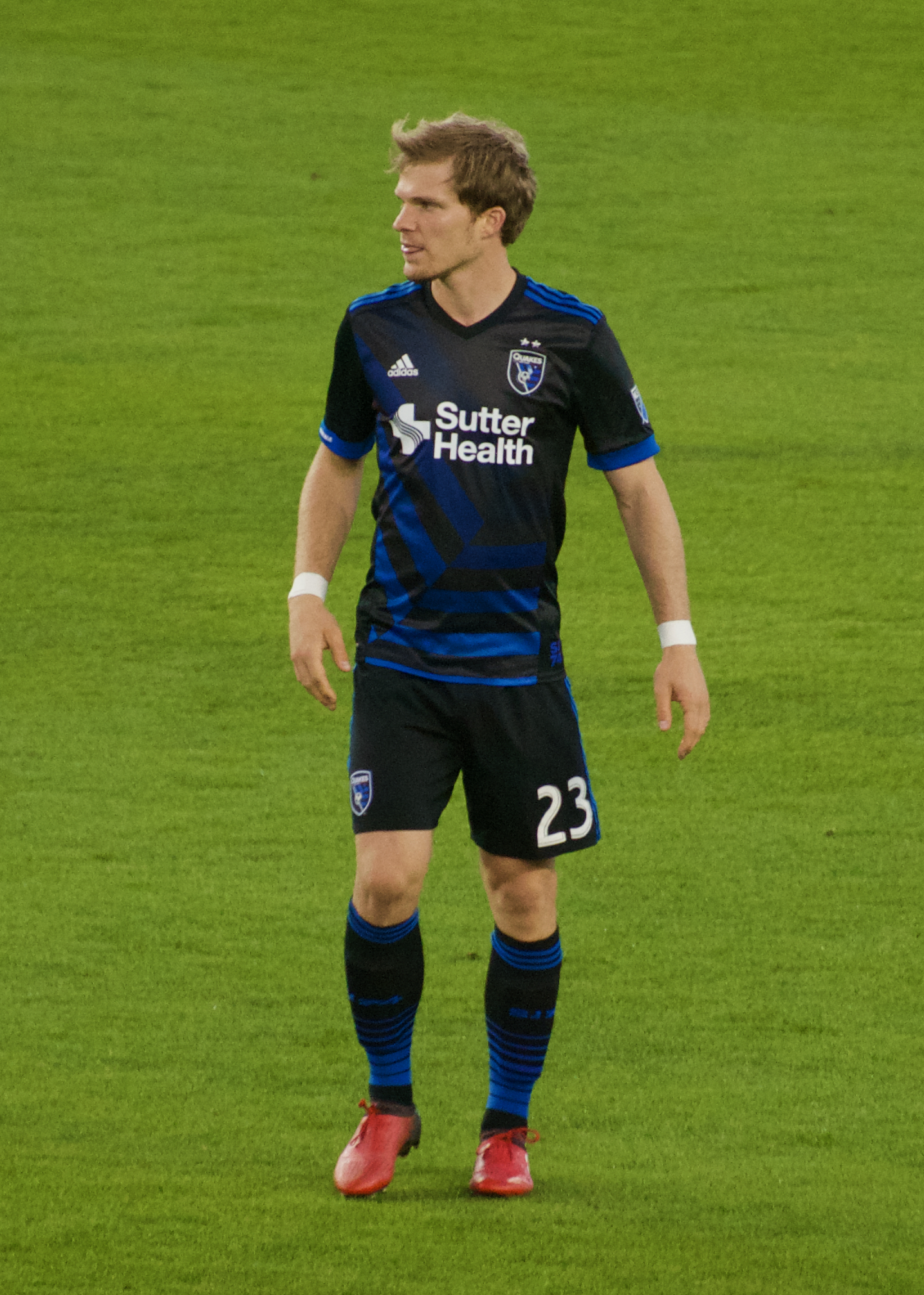
- Jungwirth with the San Jose Earthquakes in 2017

Personal information
- Full name: Florian Jungwirth
- Date of birth: 27 January 1989 (age 37)
- Place of birth: Gräfelfing, West Germany
- Height: 1.81 m (5 ft 11 in)
- Positions: Defender; midfielder

Youth career
- 1995–2000: TSV Eintracht Karlsfeld
- 2000–2007: 1860 Munich

Senior career*
Years	Team	Apps	(Gls)
2007–2010	1860 Munich II	48	(0)
2008–2010	1860 Munich	0	(0)
2010–2013	Dynamo Dresden	89	(0)
2013–2014	VfL Bochum	29	(1)
2013–2014	VfL Bochum II	4	(1)
2014–2017	Darmstadt 98	62	(0)
2017–2021	San Jose Earthquakes	124	(5)
2021–2022	Vancouver Whitecaps FC	27	(1)
2022	Whitecaps FC 2	1	(0)

International career
2004–2005	Germany U16	5	(0)
2005–2006	Germany U17	11	(0)
2006–2007	Germany U18	5	(0)
2007–2008	Germany U19	17	(0)
2008–2009	Germany U20	10	(2)

Managerial career
- 2023–: Vancouver Whitecaps FC (assistant)
- * Club domestic league appearances and goals

Florian Jungwirth (born 27 January 1989) is a German former professional footballer who played as a defender or midfielder.

== Club career ==
=== 1860 Munich ===
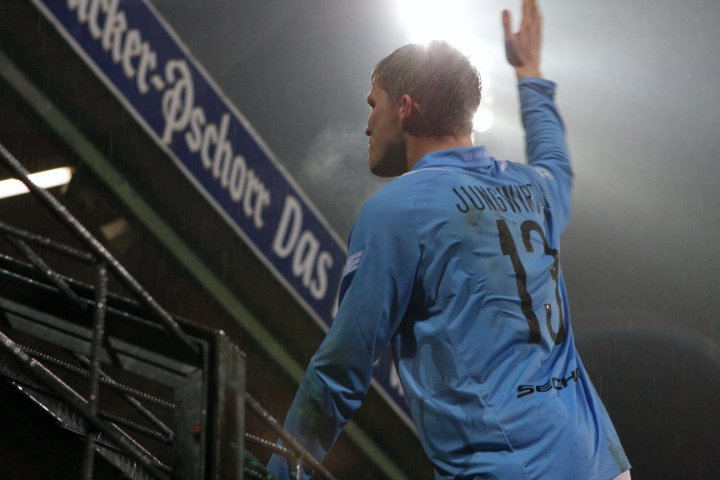
Jungwirth with 1860 Munich, 2009

Jungwirth began his career as a defender with his hometown club TSV Eintracht Karlsfeld when he was ten years old, before moving to TSV 1860 Munich, and progressing through the reserve team from age groups U-11 to U-19. He won the Deutsche Fußballmeisterschaft der B-Junioren (German B-Juniors Championship) with the U-17 team in 2006 and again in 2007 with the U-19s. Jungwirth became a member of the U-23 squad during the 2007–08 season, making his senior debut with a start on 15 September 2007 in a 3–0 victory at home against VfR Aalen. At the end of the 2009 season, he had made 48 appearances for the reserve side. He was named to the first team in the summer of 2008, but appeared only as an unused substitute eleven times during the 2008–09 season and was entirely unused for the first half of the 2009–10 season, before moving to Dynamo Dresden in January 2010.

=== Dynamo Dresden ===
Jungwirth made his debut in a 3. Fußball-Liga match during a 2–0 home win against Bayern Munich II. However, after making only eleven appearances for Dresden, he tore his cruciate ligament on 10 April 2010 during a match against FC Ingolstadt 04 and thus was sidelined until October. He helped Dresden win promotion to the 2. Bundesliga and stayed with the club, making 53 appearances over the next seasons, until his contract was up in 2013. Despite a desire to stay in Dresden, the club did not renew his contract.

=== VfL Bochum ===
Jungwirth signed with VfL Bochum in June 2013. However, due to the club's financial struggles, he moved to Darmstadt 98 in the 2014 summer transfer window.

=== Darmstadt 98 ===
Jungwirth joined SV Darmstadt 98, newly promoted from the third division, in time for the 2014–15 season. He helped the club get promoted yet again, this time to the Bundesliga, and made his Bundesliga debut on opening day of the 2015–16 season against Hannover 96. He was released in January 2017 after requesting a transfer to Major League Soccer several months earlier. Darmstadt coach and former MLS player Torsten Frings tried to block his move and criticized him heavily in the media after leaving him out of the squad in what ended up being a 6–1 defeat at home to 1. FC Köln. Jungwirth responded, "Sure, the coach can criticize my training performances in public. But whether that belongs on a news conference following a 6–1 defeat where I wasn't even in the squad is anyone's guess." His signing by the San Jose Earthquakes was announced several days later.

=== San Jose Earthquakes ===
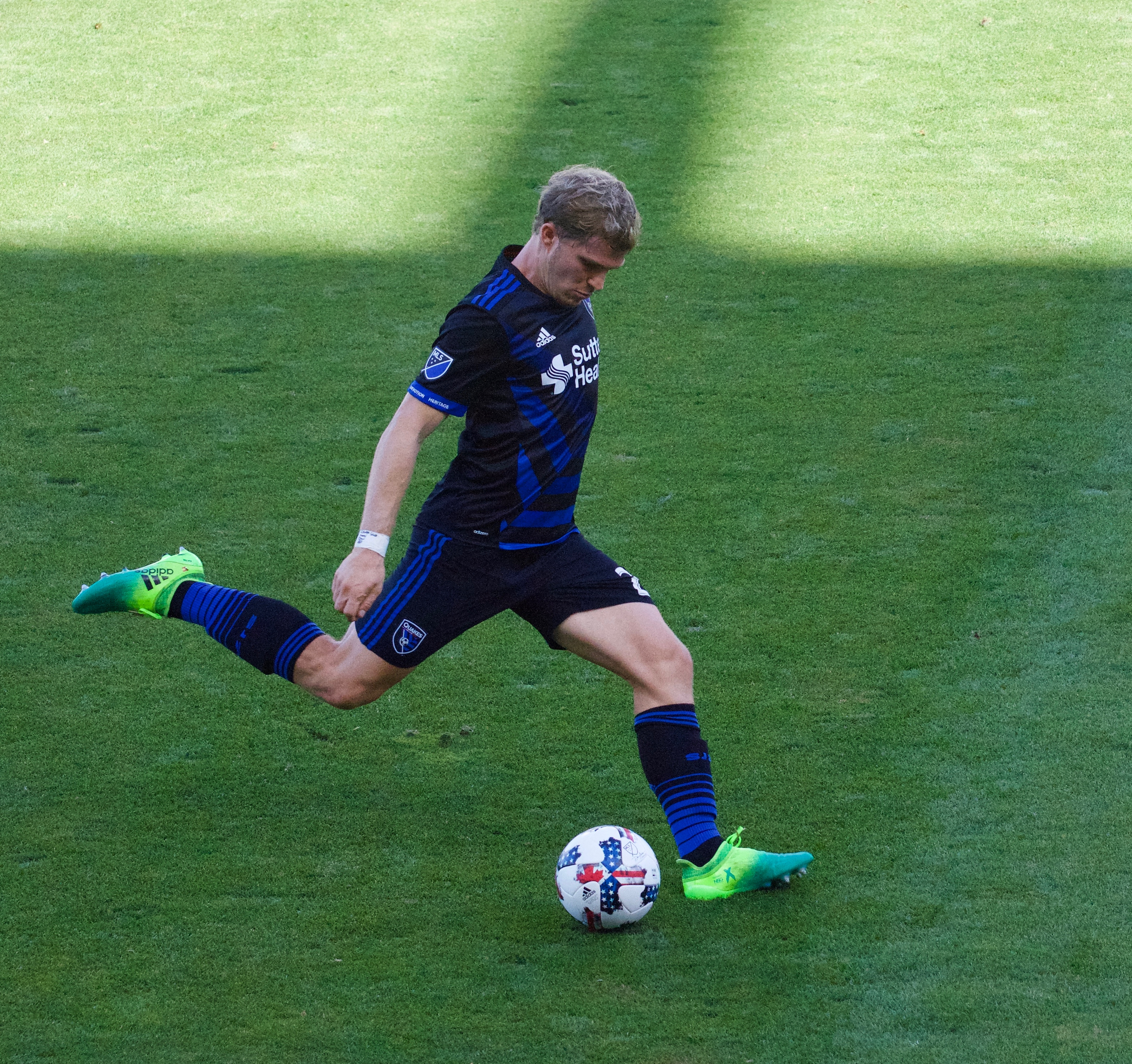
Jungwirth with San Jose, 2017

Jungwirth moved to MLS, signing a contract with the San Jose Earthquakes in February 2017. His first start for the club came on 4 March 2017 in the season-opening 1–0 home victory over the Montreal Impact. His first MLS goal was scored in stoppage time in a 2–1 road loss to Sporting Kansas City on 18 March 2017. On 14 October 2017, Jungwirth was announced as a nominee for three different league awards: the Landon Donovan MVP Award alongside teammate Chris Wondolowski, the MLS Defender of the Year Award along with teammate Nick Lima, and the MLS Newcomer of the Year Award.

=== Vancouver Whitecaps FC ===
On 6 August 2021, Jungwirth was traded to the Vancouver Whitecaps FC in exchange for $200,000 in General Allocation Money and a further $100,000 in conditional GAM. On 2 December 2021, Vancouver confirmed they had exercised his contract option, keeping him at the club through 2022.

On 27 January 2023, Jungwirth announced his retirement from playing professional footballer, and was named an assistant coach for Vancouver's first team.

== International career ==
Jungwirth has represented Germany at various youth levels, and was the captain of the team that won the 2008 UEFA Under-19 Championship, despite being ejected from the championship game prior to half-time on a second yellow card.

== Personal life ==
Jungwirth is known for his animal welfare work and specifically his efforts aiding the rescue of dogs from Spanish kill shelters. He has also stated that he would never play in China, because of his opposition to the annual Yulin Dog Meat Festival and general treatment of dogs in the country.

He married his wife Kathleen officially on 23 December 2015, and on 4 June 2016 they married in the church.

As of 27 February 2018, Jungwirth holds a U.S. green card, qualifying him as a domestic player for MLS roster purposes.

== Career statistics ==
Appearances and goals by club, season and competition
Club	Season	League			Cup (Note: Includes DFB-Pokal)		Other (Note: Includes promotion/relegation playoff and MLS Cup playoffs.)		Total	
Club	Season	Division	Apps	Goals	Apps	Goals	Apps	Goals	Apps	Goals
1860 Munich II	2007–08	Regionalliga Süd	20	0	—		—		20	0
1860 Munich II	2008–09	Regionalliga Süd	21	0	—		—		21	0
1860 Munich II	2009–10	Regionalliga Süd	7	0	—		—		7	0
1860 Munich II	Total		48	0	0	0	0	0	48	0
Dynamo Dresden	2009–10	3. Liga	11	0	—		—		11	0
Dynamo Dresden	2010–11	3. Liga	25	0	—		2	0	27	0
Dynamo Dresden	2011–12	2. Bundesliga	26	0	2	0	—		28	0
Dynamo Dresden	2012–13	2. Bundesliga	27	0	2	0	2	0	31	0
Dynamo Dresden	Total		89	0	4	0	4	0	97	0
VfL Bochum	2013–14	2. Bundesliga	29	1	1	0	—		30	1
VfL Bochum II	2013–14	Regionalliga West	1	1	—		—		1	1
VfL Bochum II	2014–15	Regionalliga West	3	1	—		—		3	1
VfL Bochum II	Total		33	3	0	0	0	0	33	3
Darmstadt 98	2014–15	2. Bundesliga	27	0	0	0	—		27	0
Darmstadt 98	2015–16	Bundesliga	19	0	2	0	—		21	0
Darmstadt 98	2016–17	Bundesliga	16	0	0	0	—		16	0
Darmstadt 98	Total		62	0	2	0	0	0	64	0
San Jose Earthquakes	2017	MLS	30	2	3	0	1	0	34	2
San Jose Earthquakes	2018	MLS	31	3	0	0	0	0	31	3
San Jose Earthquakes	2019	MLS	30	0	1	0	0	0	31	0
San Jose Earthquakes	2020	MLS	19	0	0	0	1	0	20	0
San Jose Earthquakes	2021	MLS	14	0	0	0	0	0	14	0
San Jose Earthquakes	Total		124	5	4	0	2	0	130	5
Vancouver Whitecaps FC	2021	MLS	14	1	0	0	1	0	15	1
Vancouver Whitecaps FC	2022	MLS	13	0	0	0	0	0	13	0
Vancouver Whitecaps FC	Total		27	1	0	0	1	0	28	1
Career total			412	9	11	0	7	0	430	9

== Honours ==
Individual

- Fritz Walter Medal Silver: 2008
- San Jose Earthquakes Defensive Player of the Year: 2017
