= Nick Lima =

American soccer player (born 1994)

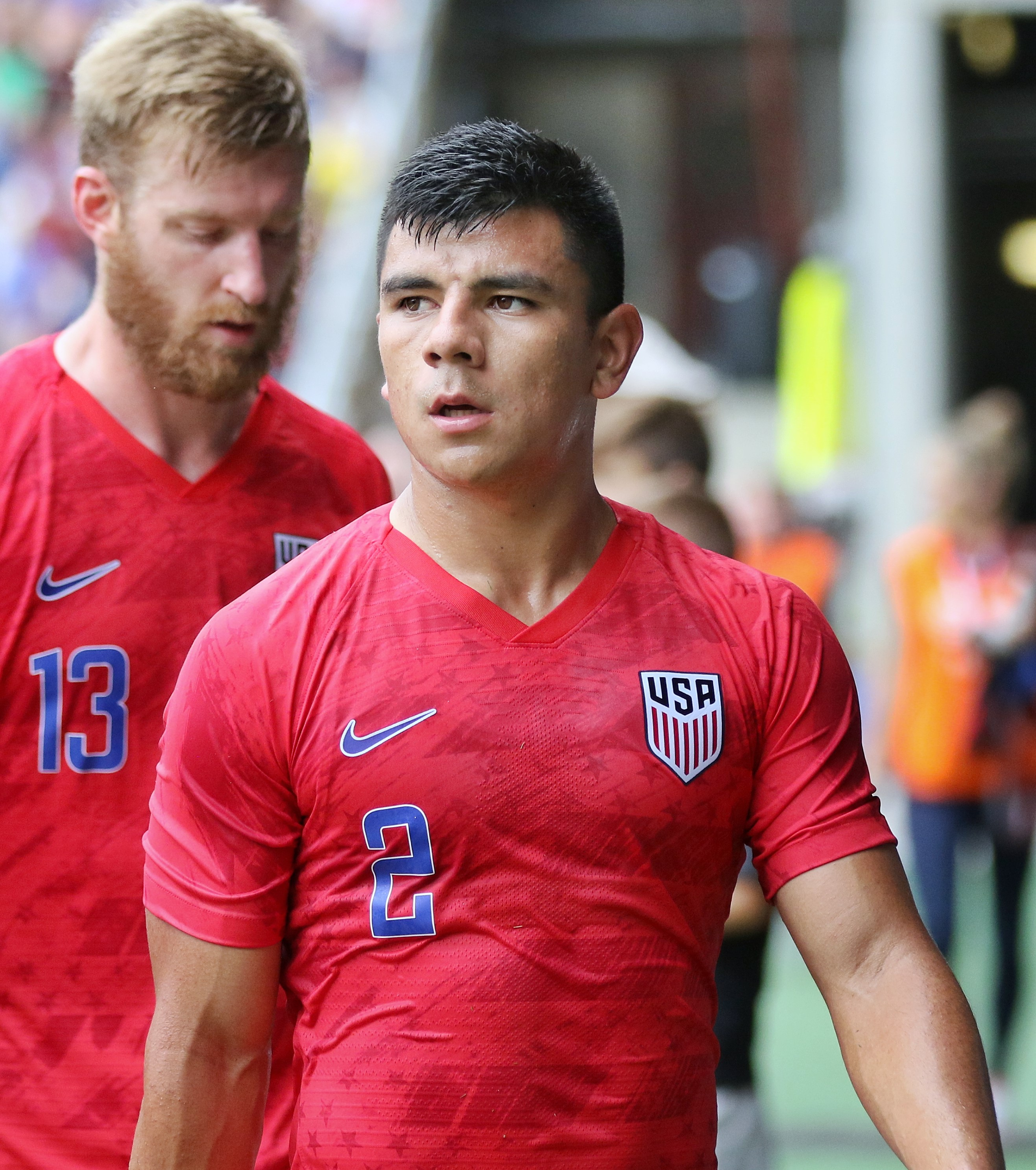
- Lima with the United States in 2019

Personal information
- Full name: Nicholas Lima
- Date of birth: November 17, 1994 (age 31)
- Place of birth: Castro Valley, California, United States
- Height: 5 ft 9 in (1.76 m)
- Position: Defender

Youth career
- 2010–2011: San Jose Earthquakes

College career
Years	Team	Apps	(Gls)
2013–2016	California Golden Bears	72	(6)

Senior career*
Years	Team	Apps	(Gls)
2015–2016	Burlingame Dragons	8	(0)
2017−2020	San Jose Earthquakes	100	(7)
2021–2023	Austin FC	95	(1)
2024	New England Revolution	25	(1)
2025	San Jose Earthquakes	11	(0)
Total		239	(9)

International career
2019	United States	9	(0)
Medal record
Representing United States
Runner-up	CONCACAF Gold Cup	2019
- * Club domestic league appearances and goals

Nicholas Lima (born November 17, 1994) is an American former professional soccer player who played as a defender.

== Early life ==
Lima played four years of college soccer at the University of California, Berkeley between 2013 and 2016.

== Club career ==
=== Burlingame Dragons ===
While at college, Lima also made several appearances for Premier Development League club Burlingame Dragons.

=== San Jose Earthquakes ===
==== 2017: Debut season and Rookie of the Year Award ====
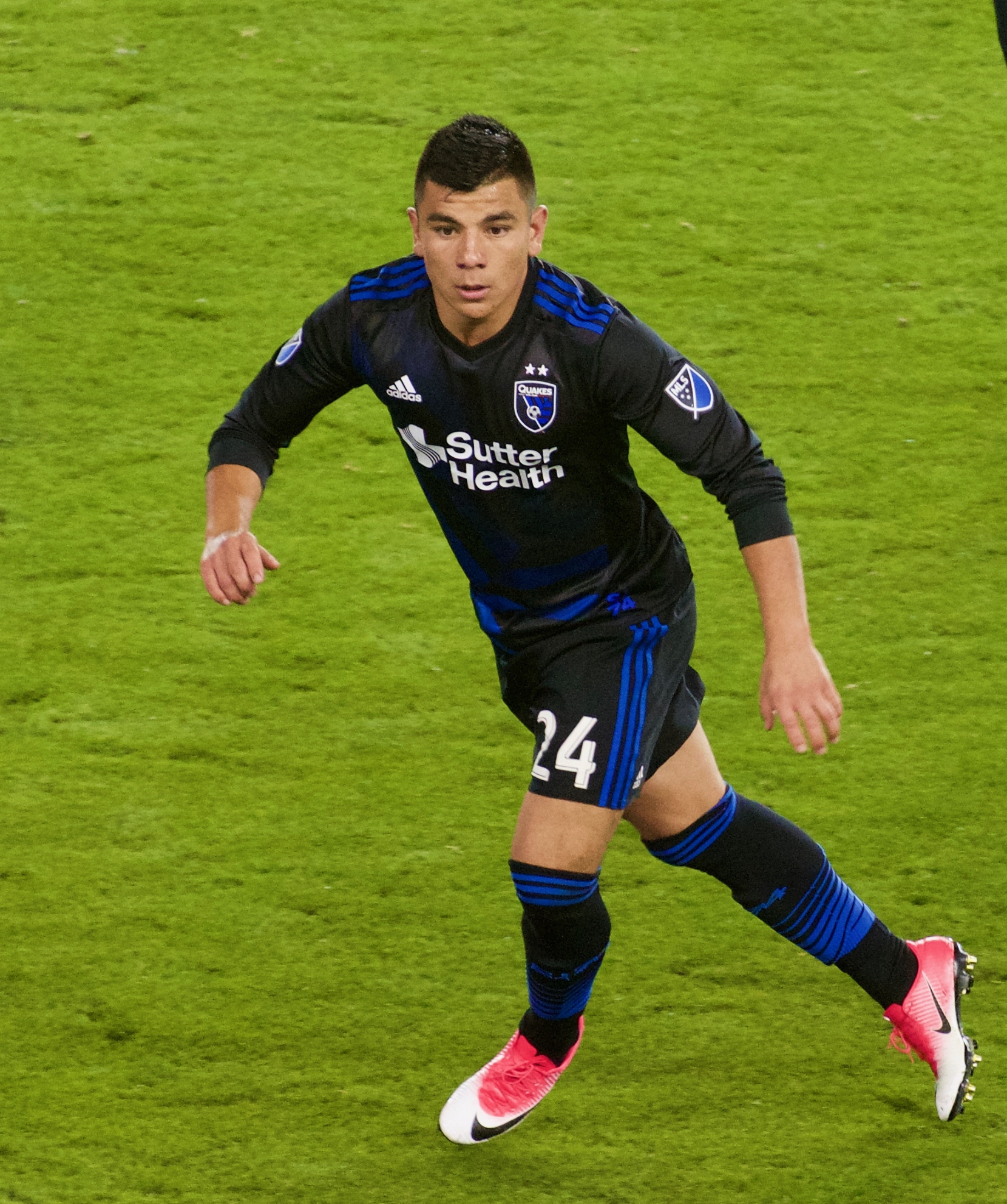
Lima playing for the San Jose Earthquakes in 2017

On December 21, 2016, Lima signed as a Homegrown Player for Major League Soccer club San Jose Earthquakes. He made his professional debut on March 4, 2017, starting in a 1–0 win over the Montreal Impact. His first professional goal was scored on March 11, 2017, in a 3–2 home victory against Vancouver Whitecaps FC. It was the first goal scored by a Homegrown player in Earthquakes history. On October 14, 2017, he was announced as a nominee for two different league awards: the MLS Defender of the Year Award alongside teammate Florian Jungwirth, and the MLS Rookie of the Year Award, along with teammate Jackson Yueill.

==== 2020: Final season and departure ====
Despite putting on his best performances, it was announced that Lima's contract would not be renewed.

=== Austin FC ===
On December 13, 2020, Lima was traded to Austin FC in exchange for $500,000 of General Allocation Money.

=== New England Revolution ===
On December 11, 2023, Lima was traded to the New England Revolution in exchange for $275,000 of General Allocation Money. He scored his first goal for the Revolution on March 6, 2024, in the team's 4–0 win over Liga Deportiva Alajuelense in the CONCACAF Champions Cup.

=== Return to San Jose Earthquakes ===
Lima became a free agent following a single season in New England, and returned to San Jose Earthquakes on a two-year deal on December 18, 2024 ahead of their upcoming 2025 season.

He announced his retirement on January 16, 2026.

== International career ==
Born in the United States, Lima is of Mexican descent. On January 8, 2018, he received a call-up for the United States men's national soccer team for a friendly against Bosnia and Herzegovina on January 28. He was named to the bench for the match but ultimately did not take the field during the 0–0 draw. He made his debut on January 27, 2019, in a friendly against Panama, starting the match. Lima played the full 90 minutes, recorded an assist, and was named Man of the Match in his international debut.

== Career statistics ==
=== Club ===
As of October 21, 2023

Club	Season	League			Playoffs		National cup		Continental		Other (Note: Includes Leagues Cup)		Totals	
Club	Season	League	Apps	Goals	Apps	Goals	Apps	Goals	Apps	Goals	Apps	Goals	Apps	Goals
Burlingame Dragons FC	2016	USL PDL	8	0	-		-		—		—		8	0
San Jose Earthquakes	2017	Major League Soccer	22	2	0	0	4	0	—		—		26	2
San Jose Earthquakes	2018	Major League Soccer	34	2	—		0	0	—		—		34	2
San Jose Earthquakes	2019	Major League Soccer	24	1	—		0	0	—		—		24	1
San Jose Earthquakes	2020	Major League Soccer	20	2	1	0	—		—		—		21	2
San Jose Earthquakes	Total		100	7	1	0	4	0	0	0	—		105	7
Austin FC	2021	Major League Soccer	28	0	—		—		—		—		28	0
Austin FC	2022	Major League Soccer	34	0	3	0	0	0	—		—		37	0
Austin FC	2023	Major League Soccer	33	1	0	0	2	0	2	0	2	0	37	1
Austin FC	Total		95	1	3	0	2	0	2	0	2	0	104	1
Career totals			203	8	4	0	6	0	2	0	2	0	217	8

=== International ===
As of October 15, 2019

National Team	Year	Apps	Goals
United States	2019	9	0
Total		9	0

Source: US Soccer
