= Danny Hoesen =

Dutch footballer

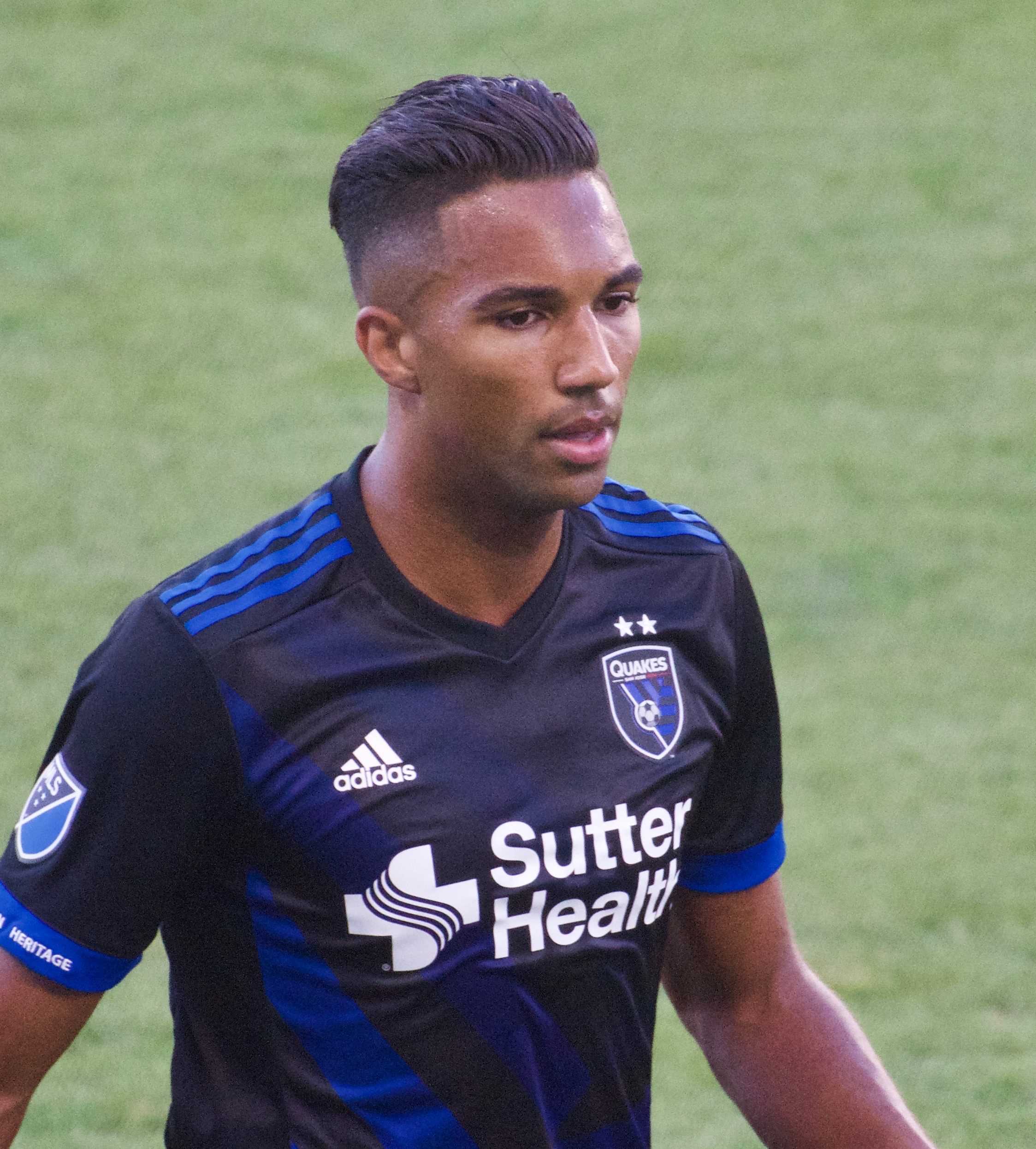
- Hoesen playing for San Jose, 2017

Personal information
- Full name: Daniel Hoesen
- Date of birth: 15 January 1991 (age 35)
- Place of birth: Heerlen, Limburg, Netherlands
- Height: 1.86 m (6 ft 1 in)
- Position: Forward

Youth career
- SV Eikenderveld
- Groene Ster
- Fortuna Sittard

Senior career*
Years	Team	Apps	(Gls)
2008–2009	Fortuna Sittard	1	(0)
2009–2012	Fulham	0	(0)
2010	→ HJK (loan)	12	(2)
2011–2012	→ Fortuna Sittard (loan)	33	(13)
2012–2014	Ajax	32	(7)
2013	→ Jong Ajax	4	(1)
2014	→ PAOK (loan)	10	(1)
2014–2017	FC Groningen	57	(11)
2017	→ San Jose Earthquakes (loan)	32	(5)
2018–2020	San Jose Earthquakes	72	(18)
2021–2022	Austin FC	19	(3)
2023	Emmen	4	(0)
Total		276	(61)

International career
2007–2008	Netherlands U17	8	(1)
2013	Netherlands U21	3	(2)
- * Club domestic league appearances and goals

Daniel Hoesen (born 15 January 1991) is a Dutch former professional footballer who played as a forward.

== Club career ==
=== Fortuna Sittard ===
After short stints at local amateur clubs Hoesen enrolled in the Fortuna Sittard youth academy. He was promoted to the first team in the summer of 2008 and made his debut for Fortuna on 15 August 2008, appearing as a substitute in an away match against Go Ahead Eagles.

=== Fulham ===
In August 2008 at the age of 17, Hoesen signed for Fulham and went straight into the Development squad.

On 30 April 2011, after his first loan spell with HJK, towards the end of the 2010–11 Premier League season, Hoesen was named on the bench in the league game against Sunderland, but he didn't make an appearance.

On 23 May 2011, Fulham confirmed that Hoesen had signed a contract extension and will remain at Fulham until June 2012. The club also had the option to extend terms until the summer of 2013.

In April 2010, Fulham announced that the Dutch striker was set to join Finnish club HJK Helsinki on loan from 9 April until 30 August. He made his HJK debut on 16 April in a 5–0 league win over KuPS. He scored his first goal for HJK on 29 May 2010 in a 1–2 away victory over IFK Mariehamn. Hoesen was released from his loan deal on 25 July due to a serious hip injury, more than one month before his contract with HJK was due to expire.

In August 2011, Hoesen joined Dutch side Fortuna Sittard on a season-long loan. The striker returned to Fulham on 31 May 2012.

=== Ajax ===
On 29 August 2012, Hoesen signed a three-year contract with Ajax. His old club Fulham retained a 30% interest in the player. He made his debut for the Ajax senior side on 3 October 2012 in the UEFA Champions League group stage match against Real Madrid, coming on as a 66th-minute substitute for Tobias Sana, in the 1–4 home loss for the Amsterdam side. Danny made his Eredivisie debut for Ajax on 17 November 2012 in a match against VVV-Venlo, coming on as a 72' minute substitute for Christian Eriksen, and scoring the second goal in the 84' minute of the 2–0 home win. Four days later on 21 November 2012, he made his second UEFA Champions League appearance, in the group stage match at home against Borussia Dortmund, coming on as a substitute in the 63rd minute for Eyong Enoh. The match ended in a 1–4 loss for the Amsterdam side, with Danny Hoesen scoring the only goal, off of an assist from his teammate Christian Eriksen. Hoesen scored a crucial goal on 26 November 2013 in a Champions League game against FC Barcelona, that Ajax won 2–1.

On 30 January 2014, it was announced that Danny Hoesen would serve out the remainder of the 2013/14 season on a 6-month loan deal playing for Thessaloniki club PAOK in the Super League Greece, where he worked with Dutch coach Huub Stevens.

=== Groningen ===
On 28 May 2014, it was announced that Hoesen had signed with Eredivisie side FC Groningen.

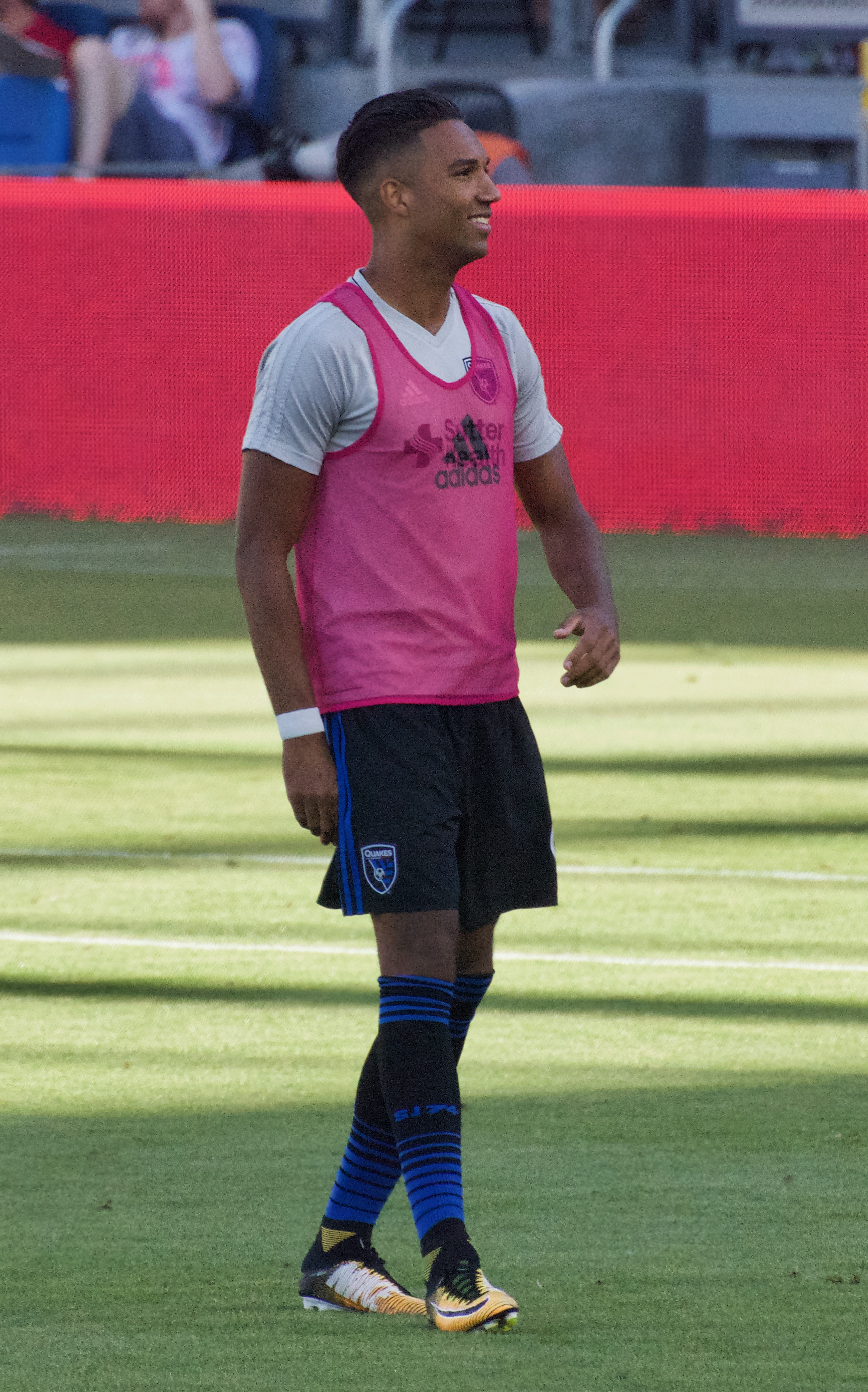
Hoesen warming up at Avaya Stadium in August 2017

On 2 February 2017, it was announced that Hoesen was acquired on a season-long loan by Major League Soccer side San Jose Earthquakes with an option to buy. His first MLS assist came in stoppage time in a 2–1 loss at Sporting Kansas City on 18 March. He scored his first MLS goal in a 4–2 home loss to the LA Galaxy on 27 May, in addition to recording his second assist. He earned MLS Team of the Week honours after again tallying a goal and an assist in the same game, this time in a 2–1 victory over Real Salt Lake on 24 June. Hoesen scored the game-winner off the bench in the knockout round of the 2017 U.S. Open Cup against Seattle Sounders FC on 28 June, recording his first cup goal for the club and giving San Jose its first-ever USOC victory over an MLS side, in addition to advancing San Jose to the quarterfinals for the first time since 2012. In an interview with Dutch website FC Update on 7 July, Hoesen stated that he hoped to stay at San Jose permanently. He scored the winning goal again in the USOC quarterfinals on 10 July 2017, to help the team to a 3–2 victory over LA, sending San Jose to the semifinals for the first time since 2004 and for only the second time in club history.

=== San Jose Earthquakes ===
On 29 December 2017, the San Jose Earthquakes announced the permanent transfer and signing of Hoesen. He scored two goals in his first game as a permanent member of the team on 3 March 2018.

=== Austin FC ===
On 15 December 2020, Hoesen was selected with the first pick in the MLS Expansion Draft by Austin FC. After just five appearances with the club, Austin FC head coach Josh Wolff announced that Hoesen would miss the rest of the 2021 season due to a hip injury which required surgery. Hoesen was released by Austin following their 2022 season.

=== Emmen ===
On 13 February 2023, Hoesen signed with Emmen until the end of the season. On 21 April 2023, FC Emmen announced that Hoesen has been forced to retire due to injuries.

== International career ==
Hoesen received his first International call up for the Netherlands under-17 team, where he played a major part in the teams qualifying campaign for the 2007 UEFA European Under-17 Football Championship in Belgium, managing to qualify the Netherlands would finish third in their group, thus failing to advance past the group stage of the main tournament. His international debut was a 3–0 win over Albania U-17 on 23 October 2007 in the qualifying rounds ahead of the European Championship.

On 22 March 2013, he was called up by head coach Cor Pot for the Netherlands U-21 side ahead of a friendly match against Norway U-21 on 25 March 2013, to replace the injured Jean-Paul Boëtius. Hoesen came on for the second half of the game and scored on his debut for the under-21 side in the 4–1 victory at home. Hoesen was also selected for the squad in qualifying ahead of the 2013 UEFA European Under-21 Football Championship in Israel but did not make the final squad for the tournament. It was later announced that he would in fact join the team to Israel to replace the injured Jürgen Locadia. He scored the fourth goal in the 5–1 win over Russia U-21 on 9 June in the final group stage match of the tournament, also playing the full 90'-minutes against eventual champions Spain U-21 in the team's final match of the tournament.

Hoesen has not played for the Netherlands senior men's national team.

== Personal life ==
Hoesen was born to a Moroccan father and a Dutch mother. He and his girlfriend had their first child, Damian, in June 2017.

In March 2019, Hoesen earned a US green card which qualifies him as a domestic player for MLS roster purposes.

== Career statistics ==
As of 30 October 2022

Appearances and goals by club, season and competition
Club	Season	League			Cup		Continental		Other		Total	
Club	Season	Division	Apps	Goals	Apps	Goals	Apps	Goals	Apps	Goals	Apps	Goals
Fortuna Sittard	2008–09	Eerste Divisie	1	0	0	0	—		—		1	0
Fulham	2009–10	Premier League	0	0	0	0	—		—		0	0
Fulham	2010–11	Premier League	0	0	0	0	—		—		0	0
Fulham	Total		0	0	0	0	0	0	0	0	0	0
HJK (loan)	2010	Veikkausliiga	12	2	2	0	1 (Note: Appearance(s) in UEFA Champions League)	0	—		15	2
Fortuna Sittard (loan)	2011–12	Eerste Divisie	33	13	1	1	—		—		34	14
Ajax	2012–13	Eredivisie	18	5	4	1	3	1	—		25	7
Ajax	2013–14	Eredivisie	14	2	3	3	2	1	0	0	19	6
Ajax	Total		32	7	7	4	5	2	0	0	44	12
Jong Ajax	2013–14	Jupiler League	4	1	—		—		—		4	1
PAOK (loan)	2013–14	Super League Greece	10	1	1	0	—		—		11	1
FC Groningen	2014–15	Eredivisie	21	2	5	2 (Note: Appearance(s) in UEFA Europa League)	2	0	—		28	4
FC Groningen	2015–16	Eredivisie	26	5	1	0	6	1	0	0	33	5
FC Groningen	2016–17	Eredivisie	10	4	2	1	—		—		12	5
FC Groningen	Total		57	11	8	3	8	1	0	0	73	14
San Jose Earthquakes (loan)	2017	MLS	32	5	4	3	—		1 (Note: Appearance(s) in MLS Cup Playoffs)	0	37	8
San Jose Earthquakes	2018	MLS	34	12	1	0	—		—		35	12
San Jose Earthquakes	2019	MLS	30	5	—		—		—		30	5
San Jose Earthquakes	2020	MLS	8	1	—		—		—		8	1
San Jose Earthquakes	Total		104	23	5	3	0	0	1	0	110	26
Austin FC	2021	MLS	5	0	—		—		—		5	0
Austin FC	2022	MLS	14	3	1	0	—		1 (Note: Appearance(s) in MLS Cup Playoffs)	0	15	3
Austin FC	Total		19	3	1	0	0	0	1	0	20	3
Career total			272	60	26	11	14	3	2	0	312	75

== Honours ==
HJK

- Veikkausliiga: 2010

Ajax

- Eredivisie: 2012–13
- Johan Cruyff Shield: 2013

Groningen

- KNVB Cup: 2014–15
