= 2020 San Jose Earthquakes season =

San Jose Earthquakes
2020 season
- Head coach: Matías Almeyda
- Stadium: Earthquakes Stadium; San Jose, California
- MLS: Conference: 8th Overall: 16th
- MLS Cup Playoffs: First round
- U.S. Open Cup: Canceled
- MLS is Back Tournament: Quarter-finals
- Heritage Cup: Winners
- Average home league attendance: 15,112
- Biggest win: LAG 0–4 SJ (October 14)
- Biggest defeat: SEA 7–1 SJ (September 10)
Home colors	Away colors

The 2020 season was the San Jose Earthquakes' 38th year of existence, their 23rd season in Major League Soccer and their 13th consecutive season in the top-flight of American soccer.

== Club ==
=== Roster ===
As of February 27, 2020

No.	Position	Nation	Player
4	DF	MEX	Oswaldo Alanís (on loan from Guadalajara)
6	MF	USA	Shea Salinas
8	FW	USA	Chris Wondolowski
9	FW	NED	Danny Hoesen
10	FW	ARG	Cristian Espinoza (DP)
11	MF	GEO	Vako Qazaishvili (DP)
12	GK	USA	Matt Bersano
14	MF	USA	Jackson Yueill
15	DF	USA	Tanner Beason
16	MF	USA	Jack Skahan
17	GK	ARG	Daniel Vega
18	GK	USA	JT Marcinkowski (HG)
19	MF	SOM	Siad Haji (GA)
21	MF	MEX	Carlos Fierro
22	DF	USA	Tommy Thompson (HG)
23	DF	GER	Florian Jungwirth
24	DF	USA	Nick Lima (HG)
25	FW	ARG	Andrés Ríos
26	MF	USA	Eric Calvillo
27	DF	PER	Marcos López
29	DF	USA	Jacob Akanyirige (HG)
33	DF	FRA	Paul Marie
35	MF	USA	Gilbert Fuentes (HG)
37	DF	GEO	Guram Kashia
41	GK	USA	Emi Ochoa (HG)
44	FW	USA	Cade Cowell (HG)
77	DF	USA	Casey Walls (HG)
93	MF	BRA	Judson
96	MF	USA	Luis Felipe

== Transfers ==
=== Transfers out ===
No.	Pos.	Player	Transferred to	Fee/notes	Date
7	MF	(Sweden) Magnus Eriksson	(Sweden) Djurgårdens IF	Undisclosed fee	August 21, 2020

== Competitions ==
=== Exhibitions ===
February 3 Preseason 1	Columbus Crew SC	4–1	San Jose Earthquakes	Cancún, Mexico
TBD (PST)	Adi 30'; Santos 36' (pen.); Hamilton 63'; Etienne 117'	Report	Skahan 7'; Calvillo (yellow card) 25'; Haji (yellow card) 32'	Stadium: Universidad La Salle; Attendance: 0

February 9 Preseason 2	Inter Playa del Carmen	0–3	San Jose Earthquakes	Cancún, Mexico
TBD (PST)		Report	Vako 47' (Ríos); Hoesen 55' (Ríos); Alanís 59' (pen.)	Stadium: Moon Palace Resort; Attendance: 0
Note: 70-minute match.

February 9 Preseason 3	Cracks del Futuro	3–3	San Jose Earthquakes	Cancún, Mexico
TBD (PST)	47'; 53' (pen.); 70'	Report	Fierro 22' (Cowell); Fuentes 63' (Skahan); Wondolowski 65' (Salinas)	Stadium: Moon Palace Resort; Attendance: 0
Note: 70-minute match.

February 18 Preseason 4	San Jose Earthquakes	5–1	Reno 1868 FC	San Jose, California
TBD (PST)	Eriksson 34'; Ríos; Salinas, Wondolowski (pen.)	Report	Partida	Stadium: Earthquakes Stadium; Attendance: 0

February 21 Preseason 5	San Jose Earthquakes	1–3	Sacramento Republic FC	San Jose, California
TBD (PST)	Ríos 13'	Report	Iwasa 7'; Skundrich 11', 29'	Stadium: Earthquakes Stadium; Attendance: 0

=== Major League Soccer ===
==== League tables ====
===== Western Conference =====
Pos	Team	Pld	W	L	T	GF	GA	GD	Pts	PPG	Qualification
6	FC Dallas	22	9	6	7	28	24	+4	34	1.55	MLS Cup First Round
7	Los Angeles FC	22	9	8	5	47	39	+8	32	1.45	MLS Cup First Round
8	San Jose Earthquakes	23	8	9	6	35	51	−16	30	1.30	MLS Cup First Round
9	Vancouver Whitecaps FC	23	9	14	0	27	44	−17	27	1.17	
10	LA Galaxy	22	6	12	4	27	46	−19	22	1.00	

Source: MLS
Rules for classification: 1) points per game; 2) total wins per match played; 3) total goal differential per match played; 4) total goals scored per match played; 5) fewest disciplinary points per match played; 6) away goal differential per away match played; 7) away goals scored per away match played; 8) home goal differential per home match played; 9) home goals scored per home match played; 10) coin toss or drawing of lots.

==== MLS is Back – Group stage ====
Group B results
Pos	Team	Pld	W	D	L	GF	GA	GD	Pts	Qualification
1	San Jose Earthquakes	3	2	1	0	6	3	+3	7	Advanced to knockout stage
2	Seattle Sounders FC	3	1	1	1	4	2	+2	4	Advanced to knockout stage
3	Vancouver Whitecaps FC	3	1	0	2	5	7	−2	3	Advanced to knockout stage
4	Chicago Fire	3	1	0	2	2	5	−3	3	

Source: MLS

===== Overall =====
2020 MLS overall standings
Pos	Team	Pld	W	L	T	GF	GA	GD	Pts	PPG
14	Nashville SC	23	8	7	8	24	22	+2	32	1.39
15	New England Revolution	23	8	7	8	26	25	+1	32	1.39
16	San Jose Earthquakes	23	8	9	6	35	51	−16	30	1.30
17	Vancouver Whitecaps FC	23	9	14	0	27	44	−17	27	1.17
18	Montreal Impact	23	8	13	2	33	43	−10	26	1.13

Source: MLS
Rules for classification: 1) points per game; 2) total wins per match played; 3) total goal differential per match played; 4) total goals scored per match played; 5) fewest disciplinary points per match played; 6) away goal differential per away match played; 7) away goals scored per away match played; 8) home goal differential per home match played; 9) home goals scored per home match played; 10) coin toss or drawing of lots.

==== Match results ====
Win Draw Loss

February 29 1	San Jose Earthquakes	2–2	Toronto FC	San Jose, CA
14:15 (PST)	Thompson (yellow card) 33'; Ríos 53'; Yueill (yellow card) 70'; Kashia (yellow card) 81'; Alanís 90+5'; Wondolowski (yellow card) 90+6'	Report	Pozuelo 40' (pen.); Laryea 51'; Altidore (yellow card) 71'; Endoh (yellow card) 90+4'	Stadium: Earthquakes Stadium; Attendance: 18,000; Referee: Armando Villarreal

March 7 2	San Jose Earthquakes	2–5	Minnesota United FC	San Jose, CA
16:45 (PST)	Eriksson 19' (pen.); Qazaishvili 53'	Report	Opara 13', 71'; Greguš 26'; Amarilla 32', (yellow card) 67'; Lod 45+3'	Stadium: Earthquakes Stadium; Attendance: 12,223; Referee: Baldomero Toledo

July 10 3 MLSiBT Group stage	Seattle Sounders FC	0–0	San Jose Earthquakes	Bay Lake, Florida
18:00 (PDT)	Arreaga (yellow card) 24'	Report	Thompson (yellow card) 19'	Stadium: ESPN Wide World of Sports Complex; Attendance: 0 Referee: Drew Fischer

July 15 4 MLSiBT Group stage	Vancouver Whitecaps FC	3–4	San Jose Earthquakes	Bay Lake, Florida
19:30 PDT	Adnan 7'; Judson 22' (o.g.); Dájome 59'; Khmiri (yellow card) 76'	Report	Ríos 45+2'; Espinoza (yellow card) 56'; Wondolowski 72'; Alanís 81'; Yueill (yellow card) 90+3'; Salinas 90+8'; Fierro (yellow card) 90+10'	Stadium: ESPN Wide World of Sports Complex; Referee: Chris Ruska

July 19 5 MLSiBT Group stage	Chicago Fire FC	0–2	San Jose Earthquakes	Bay Lake, Florida
17:00 PDT	Sekulic (yellow card) 29'; Medrán (yellow card) 53'; Giménez (yellow card) 58'; Herbers (yellow card) 61'; Pineda (yellow card) 62'	Report	Jungwirth (yellow card) 37'; Judson (yellow card) 50'; Espinoza 56'; Wondolowski 83'; Eriksson (yellow card) 86'	Stadium: ESPN Wide World of Sports Complex; Referee: Ramy Touchan

July 27 MLSiBT Round of 16	San Jose Earthquakes	5–2	Real Salt Lake	Bay Lake, Florida
17:30 PDT	Espinoza 21', (yellow card) 31'; Eriksson 49' (pen.), 90+6' (pen.); Qazaishvili 61'; Wondolowski 86'	Report	Martínez 22'; Herrera (yellow card) 29'; Baird (yellow card) 37'; Glad (yellow card) 66'; Kreilach 75'; Silva (red card) 84'; Beckerman (red card) 90+7'	Stadium: ESPN Wide World of Sports Complex; Referee: Drew Fischer

August 1 MLSiBT Quarterfinals	San Jose Earthquakes	1–4	Minnesota United FC	Bay Lake, Florida
17:00 PDT	Eriksson 50' (pen.)		Lod 20'; Hayes 21'; Amarilla 56'; Hairston 86'	Stadium: ESPN Wide World of Sports Complex; Referee: Jair Marrufo

August 26 6	San Jose Earthquakes	P–P	Portland Timbers	San Jose, California
19:30 PDT				Stadium: Avaya Stadium
Note: Match postponed.

August 29 7	LA Galaxy	3–2	San Jose Earthquakes	Carson, California
19:30 PDT	Steres 33'; Feltscher (yellow card) 52'; Araujo (yellow card) 56'; Pavón 72' (pen.); Lletget 82'	Report	Qazaishvili 11'; Cowell 59'	Stadium: Dignity Health Sports Park; Referee: Victor Rivas

September 2 8	Los Angeles FC	5–1	San Jose Earthquakes	Los Angeles, California
19:30 PDT	Rossi 21', 69'; Palacios (yellow card) 33'; Wright-Phillips 49'; Cifuentes 64'; Musovski 83'	Report	Hoesen 90+2'	Stadium: Banc of California Stadium; Attendance: 0 Referee: Alex Chilowicz

September 5 9	San Jose Earthquakes	1–1	Colorado Rapids	San Jose, California
19:30 PDT	Marie (yellow card) 1'; Alanís (yellow card) 38'; Jungwirth (yellow card) 50'; Espinoza (yellow card) 57'; Wondolowski 59' (pen.)	Report	Acosta (yellow card) 45'; Kamara 81'; Bassett (yellow card) 83'; Abubakar (yellow card) 90+1'	Stadium: Earthquakes Stadium; Referee: Kevin Stott

September 10 10	Seattle Sounders FC	7–1	San Jose Earthquakes	Seattle, Washington
19:00 PDT	Morris 4'; Ruidíaz 12', 33'; Leerdam 15'; Jones 20', 59'; João Paulo 48'	Boxscore	Ríos (yellow card) 30'; Wondolowski 71' (pen.)	Stadium: CenturyLink Field; Referee: Allen Chapman

September 13 11	San Jose Earthquakes	0–0	LA Galaxy	San Jose, California
20:00 PDT	Lima (yellow card) 3'	Report	Steres (yellow card) 17'; Araujo (yellow card) 90+4'	Stadium: Earthquakes Stadium; Attendance: 0 Referee: Timothy Ford

September 16 6	San Jose Earthquakes	1–1	Portland Timbers	San Jose, California
18:30 PDT				Stadium: Avaya Stadium; Attendance: 0
Note: Re-schedule of postponed August 26 match.

September 19 12	San Jose Earthquakes	1–6	Portland Timbers	San Jose, California
19:30 PDT	Lima (yellow card) 14'; Fierro 44'; Jungwirth (yellow card) 49'	Report	Valeri 25' (pen.), 57'; Conechny (yellow card) 29'; Ebobisse 27'; Y. Chará 70'; Cascante 85'; Niezgoda 87'	Stadium: Earthquakes Stadium; Referee: Rosendo Mendoza

September 23 13	Colorado Rapids	5–0	San Jose Earthquakes	Commerce City, Colorado
18:00 PDT	Bassett 35'; Acosta (yellow card) 38'; Shinyashiki (yellow card) 44', (goal) 84'; Lewis 50'; Thompson 70' (o.g.); Mezquida 79'	Report	Judson (yellow card) 43'; Hoesen (yellow card) 86'	Stadium: Dick's Sporting Goods Park; Referee: Drew Fischer

September 27 14	Los Angeles FC	1–2	San Jose Earthquakes	Carson, California
18:00 PDT	Kaye 45'; Ginella (yellow card) 90+30'	Report	Ríos (yellow card) 34'; Salinas (yellow card) 75', (goal) 80'; Espinoza (yellow card) 83'; Yueill 90+3'	Stadium: Dignity Health Sports Park; Referee: Ismail Elfath

October 3 15	San Jose Earthquakes	2–1	LA Galaxy	San Jose, California
19:30 PDT	López 42'; Fierro (yellow card) 45'; Yueill (yellow card) 63'; Ríos 82' (pen.); Marcinkowski (yellow card) 90+4'	Report	Lletget 4'; DePuy (yellow card) 12'; Kitchen (yellow card) 31' dos Santos (yellow card) 45+1'; Corona (yellow card) 60'	Stadium: Earthquakes Stadium; Referee: Robert Sibiga

October 7 16	San Jose Earthquakes	3–0	Vancouver Whitecaps FC	San Jose, California
19:30 PDT	Jungwirth (yellow card) 45+3'; Espinoza 59'; Ríos 66'; Marie 90+3'	Report	Rose (yellow card) 17' (yellow-red card) 52'; Baldisimo (yellow card) 60'; Godoy (red card) 75'	Stadium: Earthquakes Stadium; Referee: Allen Chapman

October 11 17	Portland Timbers	3–0	San Jose Earthquakes	Portland, Oregon
19:00 PDT	Williamson (yellow card) 18'; Farfan (yellow card) 29'; Niezgoda 46', 52'; Mora 86'	Report	Beason (yellow card) 69'; Ríos (yellow card) 79'	Stadium: Providence Park; Referee: Guido Gonzales, Jr.

October 14 18	LA Galaxy	0–4	San Jose Earthquakes	Carson, California
19:30 PDT	Insúa (yellow card) 47'; Araujo (yellow card) 61'	Report	Lima 44', 90+3'; Ríos 52'; Thompson 76'	Stadium: Dignity Health Sports Park; Referee: Alex Chilowicz

October 18 19	San Jose Earthquakes	0–0	Seattle Sounders FC	San Jose, California
19:30 (PDT)	Judson (yellow card) 53'	Report	Gómez Andrade (yellow card) 76'	Stadium: Earthquakes Stadium; Referee: Kevin Stott

October 24 20	Vancouver Whitecaps FC	2–1	San Jose Earthquakes	Portland, Oregon
19:00 (PDT)	Adnan 51'; Ricketts 57'; Teibert (yellow card) 90+1'; Owusu (yellow card) 90+3'	Report	Fierro 24'; López (yellow card) 82'	Stadium: Providence Park; Referee: Marcos de Oliveira

October 28 21	San Jose Earthquakes	2–0	Real Salt Lake	San Jose, California
19:30 PDT	Wondolowski 16', 74'; Judson (yellow card) 53'; Ríos (yellow card) 64'	Report	Silva (yellow card) 10'; Besler (yellow card) 22'; Toia (yellow card) 39'; Herrera (yellow card) 59'; Kreilach (yellow card) 63'	Stadium: Earthquakes Stadium; Referee: Elton García

November 4 22	San Jose Earthquakes	3–2	Los Angeles FC	San Jose, California
20:00 PST	Ríos (yellow card) 21'; Atuesta 28' (o.g.); Wondolowski 37'; Yueill (yellow card) 51' (yellow-red card) 61'; Espinoza 72'	Report	Blessing 23'; Ginella (yellow card) 33'; Murillo (yellow card) 66'; Rossi 90+5'	Stadium: Earthquakes Stadium; Referee: Timothy Ford

November 8 23	Seattle Sounders FC	4–1	San Jose Earthquakes	Seattle, Washington
15:30 PST	Lodeiro 52'; Ruidíaz 54'; Morris 74'; López 80' (o.g.)	Report	López 57'	Stadium: CenturyLink Field; Referee: Jair Marrufo

==== MLS Cup Playoffs ====
November 22 First round	Sporting Kansas City	3–3 (a.e.t.) (3–0 p)	San Jose Earthquakes	Kansas City, Kansas
1:00 pm PST	R. Espinoza 4'; Reid (yellow card) 39'; Ilie 47'; Dia (yellow card) 78'; R. Espinoza (yellow card) 79'; Russell (yellow card) 86'; Busio 90+1'	Report	Fierro 22'; Lima (yellow card) 28'; Salinas 34'; López (yellow card) 56'; C. Espinoza (yellow card) 85'; Wondolowski 90+7'	Stadium: Children's Mercy Park; Referee: Nima Saghafi
	Penalties
	Russell (penalty scored); Ilie (penalty scored); Shelton (penalty scored)		(penalty missed) Alanís; (penalty missed) Yueill; (penalty missed) C. Espinoza

=== U.S. Open Cup ===
Due to their final standings for the 2019 season, the Earthquakes were scheduled enter the competition in the Third Round, to be played April 21–23. The ongoing coronavirus pandemic, however, forced the U.S. Soccer Federation to cancel the tournament on August 17, 2020.
