= Andrés Imperiale =

Argentine footballer

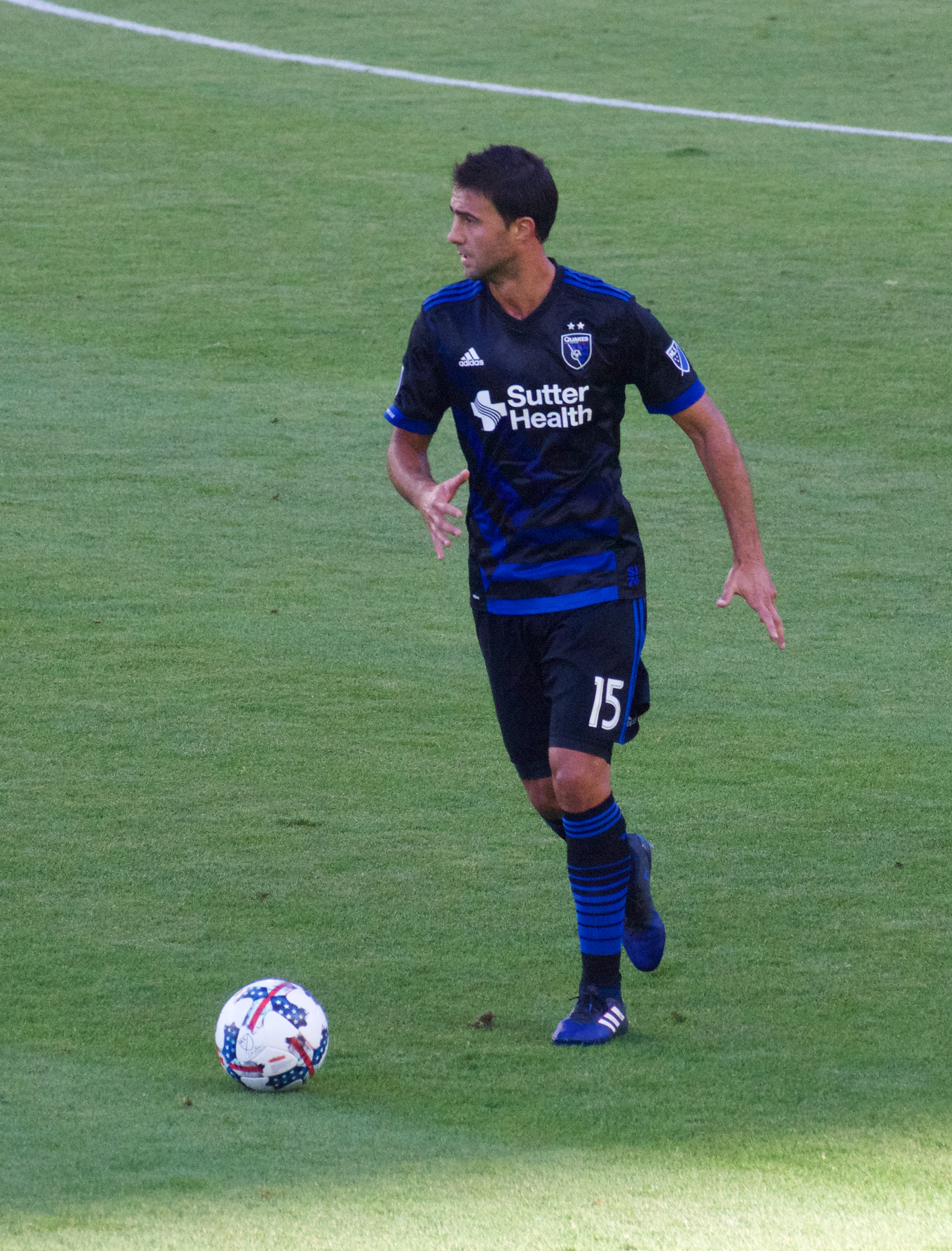
- Playing for San Jose in 2017

Personal information
- Full name: Andrés Roberto Imperiale
- Date of birth: July 8, 1986 (age 40)
- Place of birth: Rosario, Argentina
- Height: 1.85 m (6 ft 1 in)
- Position: Centre back

Team information
- Current team: San Luis
- Number: 5

Senior career*
Years	Team	Apps	(Gls)
2005–2010	Rosario Central	24	(0)
2008	→ San Martín de Tucumán (loan)	2	(0)
2009	→ Oriente Petrolero (loan)	37	(2)
2010	→ Blooming (loan)	19	(0)
2010–2011	Doxa Katokopias	11	(0)
2011–2012	Aris Limassol	12	(0)
2012–2015	Universidad de Concepción	53	(2)
2015–2016	Deportivo Saprissa	39	(2)
2016–2017	San Jose Earthquakes	24	(0)
2018	Club Guaraní	18	(0)
2019	Deportes Iquique	13	(0)
2020–	San Luis	22	(1)
- * Club domestic league appearances and goals as of 20 December 2020

Andrés Roberto Imperiale (born July 8, 1986) is an Argentine football defender who plays for San Luis in Primera B de Chile.

== Career ==
Imperiale made his first team debut for Rosario Central in 2005 with Cuffaro Russo as the manager. By 2007, he established himself as a regular member of the first team squad. He has played in central defense and as a left-back. In 2009, he joined Bolivian side Oriente Petrolero on loan by request of team manager Pablo Sánchez at the time. He scored his first professional goal in league play on May 31, 2009, in a 2–0 home victory over club Universitario. In January 2010, he was loaned out to fierce rival Blooming. Later in the year he transferred to Cypriot club Doxa Katokopia before he moved to Aris Limassol not long after.

In 2012, he reunited with manager Pablo Sánchez at Chilean club Universidad de Concepción where he stayed for three seasons before moving to Deportivo Saprissa in 2015. In January 2016, he signed with the San Jose Earthquakes of Major League Soccer.

Imperiale left San Jose in December 2017 for Paraguayan side Club Guaraní.

== Club titles ==
Season	Club	Title
2013	Universidad de Concepción	Primera B de Chile
2014/2015	Deportivo Saprissa	Costa Rican Primera División
2018	Club Guarani	Copa Paraguay
