= 2016 San Jose Earthquakes season =

San Jose Earthquakes
2016 season
- Owner: Earthquakes Soccer, LLC
- Coach: Dominic Kinnear
- Stadium: Avaya Stadium (Primary); Stanford Stadium (1 League game)
- Major League Soccer: Conference: 9th Overall: 17th
- U.S. Open Cup: Fourth round
- California Clásico: 2nd (0–1–2)
- Heritage Cup: 2nd (0–1–1)
- Top goalscorer: League: Chris Wondolowski (12); All: Chris Wondolowski (14)
- Highest home attendance: 50,816 (Jun. 25 vs. Los Angeles at Stanford Stadium)
- Lowest home attendance: League: 18,000 (Multiple games, Avaya Stadium capacity); All: 15,697 (May 18 vs. Real Sociedad)
- Average home league attendance: League: 22,102; All: 21,390
Home colors	Away colors

The 2016 San Jose Earthquakes season was the club's 34th year of existence, their 19th season in Major League Soccer and their 9th consecutive season in the top-flight of American soccer.

== Club ==
=== Roster ===
As of March 7, 2016.

No.	Position	Nation	Player
1	GK	USA	David Bingham
3	DF	ENG	Jordan Stewart
4	MF	USA	Marvell Wynne
5	DF	HON	Víctor Bernárdez (Vice-Captain)
6	MF	USA	Shea Salinas
7	MF	TTO	Cordell Cato
8	FW	USA	Chris Wondolowski (DP & Captain)
11	FW	SUI	Innocent Emeghara (DP)
12	FW	USA	Mark Sherrod
17	MF	ESA	Darwin Cerén
19	FW	USA	Chad Barrett
20	DF	JAM	Shaun Francis
21	DF	USA	Clarence Goodson
22	FW	USA	Tommy Thompson (HGP)
24	FW	USA	Steven Lenhart
25	FW	USA	Quincy Amarikwa
27	MF	USA	Fatai Alashe
28	GK	USA	Andrew Tarbell
30	MF	PAN	Anibal Godoy
32	DF	ARG	Andres Imperiale
33	MF	USA	Marc Pelosi
35	GK	USA	Bryan Meredith
38	MF	BRA	Matheus Silva
49	MF	JAM	Simon Dawkins
91	MF	PAN	Alberto Quintero

== Non-competitive ==
=== Arizona friendlies ===
February 3	San Jose Earthquakes	0–2	New England Revolution	Tucson, Arizona
10:30 PST		Report	Rowe 28'; Davies 45+2'	Stadium: Kino Sports Complex

February 6	San Jose Earthquakes	0–1	Houston Dynamo	Tucson, Arizona
16:00 PST		Report	Torres 46'	Stadium: Kino Sports Complex

February 9	San Jose Earthquakes	1–0	Seongnam FC	Tucson, Arizona
10:30 PST	Sherrod 87'	Report		Stadium: Kino Sports Complex

=== Las Vegas friendly ===
February 13	San Jose Earthquakes	0–1	LA Galaxy	Las Vegas, Nevada
19:00 PST		Report	Zardes 27'	Stadium: Cashman Field

=== California friendlies ===
February 20	Sacramento Republic	0–1	San Jose Earthquakes	Sacramento, California
	Pridham 8'	Report	Amarikwa 51', 86'; Godoy (yellow card) 81'; Thompson (yellow card) 90'	Stadium: Bonney Field; Attendance: 11,499

February 27	San Jose Earthquakes	1–0	New York Cosmos	San Jose, California
19:00 PST	Wondolowski (yellow card) 31'; Amarikwa (yellow card) 42'; Goodson 51'; Godoy (yellow card) 67'	Report	Ayoze (yellow card) 54'	Stadium: Avaya Stadium

May 18	San Jose Earthquakes	2–1	Real Sociedad	San Jose, California
19:30 PST	Wondolowski 42', 79'; Sarkodie (yellow card) 82'; Thompson (yellow card) 85'	Report	de la Bella 10'; Zubeldia (yellow card) 77'	Stadium: Avaya Stadium; Attendance: 15,697

== Competitive ==
=== Major League Soccer ===
==== Standings ====
Western Conference Table

Pos	Team	Pld	W	L	T	GF	GA	GD	Pts	Qualification
6	Real Salt Lake	34	12	12	10	44	46	−2	46	MLS Cup Knockout Round
7	Portland Timbers	34	12	14	8	48	53	−5	44	
8	Vancouver Whitecaps FC	34	10	15	9	45	52	−7	39	
9	San Jose Earthquakes	34	8	12	14	32	40	−8	38	
10	Houston Dynamo	34	7	14	13	39	45	−6	34	

Source: MLS

Overall Table

Pos	Team	Pld	W	L	T	GF	GA	GD	Pts
15	Orlando City SC	34	9	11	14	55	60	−5	41
16	Vancouver Whitecaps FC	34	10	15	9	45	52	−7	39
17	San Jose Earthquakes	34	8	12	14	32	40	−8	38
18	Columbus Crew SC	34	8	14	12	50	58	−8	36
19	Houston Dynamo	34	7	14	13	39	45	−6	34

Source: MLS
Rules for classification: 1) points; 2) total wins; 3) total goal differential; 4) total goals scored;

==== Results ====
March 6 Round 1	San Jose Earthquakes	1–0	Colorado Rapids	San Jose, California
12:00 PDT	Wondolowski 46'; Godoy (yellow card) 72'; Quintero (yellow card) 75'	Report	Azira (yellow card) 43'; Powers (yellow card) 86'	Stadium: Avaya Stadium; Attendance: 18,000; Referee: Ted Unkel

March 13 Round 2	San Jose Earthquakes	2–1	Portland Timbers	San Jose, California
16:00 PDT	Wondolowski 30'; Amarikwa 45+1'; Bernárdez (yellow card) 64'; Bingham (yellow card) 90+2'	Report	McInerney 89'	Stadium: Avaya Stadium; Attendance: 18,000; Referee: Jair Marrufo

March 19 Round 3	LA Galaxy	3–1	San Jose Earthquakes	Carson, California
19:30 PDT	Magee (yellow card) 11'; Van Damme (yellow card) 21' de Jong (yellow card) 22'; Zardes 56', 62'; Keane 90+1' (pen.); Gordon (yellow card) 90+3'	Report	Imperiale (yellow card) 41'; Dawkins (red card) 45+3'; Alashe (yellow card) 52'; Wynne (yellow card) 56'; Wondolowski 89'	Stadium: StubHub Center; Attendance: 25,667; Referee: Ismail Elfath

April 2 Round 4	San Jose Earthquakes	1–1	D.C. United	San Jose, California
19:30 PDT	Francis (yellow card) 31'; Imperiale (yellow card) 55'; Jahn 88'	Report	Nyarko 34', (yellow card) 64'; Kemp (yellow card) 59'; Acosta (yellow card) 86'	Stadium: Avaya Stadium; Attendance: 18,000; Referee: Fotis Bazakos

April 9 Round 5	FC Dallas	2–2	San Jose Earthquakes	Frisco, Texas
18:00 PDT	Acosta (yellow card) 14'; Gruezo (yellow card) 31'; Akindele 36' (pen.); Bernárdez 62' (o.g.); Rosales (yellow card) 84'; Figueroa (yellow card) 87'	Report	Quintero 4'; Alashe (yellow card) 41'; Wondolowski 55'	Stadium: Toyota Stadium; Attendance: 13,386; Referee: Alan Kelly

April 13 Round 6	San Jose Earthquakes	2–0	New York Red Bulls	San Jose, California
19:30 PDT	Alashe 40'; García (yellow card) 45'; Wondolowski 55'	Report	Kljestan (yellow card) 62'	Stadium: Avaya Stadium; Attendance: 18,000; Referee: David Gantar

April 16 Round 7	Portland Timbers	3–1	San Jose Earthquakes	Portland, Oregon
19:30 PDT	Mclnerney 52'; Adi 65', 90+9'; Valeri (yellow card) 90' (yellow-red card) 90+5'	Report	Godoy (yellow card) 55'; Wondolowski 90+1'; Bingham (yellow card) 90+5'	Stadium: Providence Park; Attendance: 21,144; Referee: Corey Parker

April 24 Round 8	San Jose Earthquakes	1–0	Sporting KC	San Jose, California
12:30 PDT	Godoy (yellow card) 1'; Wondolowski 59' (pen.)	Report	Besler (yellow card) 33'; Feilhaber (yellow card) 59'; Dia (yellow card) 81'	Stadium: Avaya Stadium; Attendance: 18,000; Referee: Jair Marrufo

April 30 Round 9	Philadelphia Union	1–1	San Jose Earthquakes	Chester, Pennsylvania
13:00 PDT	Pontius 30'	Report	Alashe (yellow card) 31'; Godoy (yellow card) 35' (yellow-red card) 59'; Dawkins 83'	Stadium: Talen Energy Stadium; Attendance: 16,079; Referee: Ricardo Salazar

May 7 Round 10	Seattle Sounders FC	2–0	San Jose Earthquakes	Seattle, Washington
19:00 PDT	Dempsey 26'; Alonso (yellow card) 43'; Morris 89'	Report		Stadium: CenturyLink Field; Attendance: 39,570; Referee: Alan Kelly

May 11 Round 11	San Jose Earthquakes	3–1	Houston Dynamo	San Jose, California
19:30 PDT	Quintero 3', 70'; Godoy 50'; Wynne (yellow card) 73'	Report	Alex (yellow card) 21'; Clark 43'; Deric (red card) 79'	Stadium: Avaya Stadium; Attendance: 18,000; Referee: Jaime Herrera

May 22 Round 12	LA Galaxy	1–1	San Jose Earthquakes	Carson, California
16:00 PDT	Wynne 83' (o.g.)	Report	Quintero (yellow card) 23'; Alashe 87'	Stadium: StubHub Center; Attendance: 27,162; Referee: Kevin Stott

May 28 Round 13	San Jose Earthquakes	0–0	FC Dallas	San Jose, California
19:30 PDT	Thompson (yellow card) 67'	Report	Hollingshead (yellow card) 53'	Stadium: Avaya Stadium; Attendance: 18,000; Referee: Juan Guzman

June 1 Round 14	Portland Timbers	1–0	San Jose Earthquakes	Portland, Oregon
19:30 PDT	Ridgewell 11'; Asprilla (red card) 45+2'	Report	Silva (yellow card) 17'; Stewart (yellow card) 61'; Barrett (yellow card) 77'; García (yellow card) 90+3'	Stadium: Providence Park; Attendance: 21,144; Referee: Chris Penso

June 18 Round 15	Orlando City SC	2–2	San Jose Earthquakes	Orlando, Florida
16:30 PDT	Hines (yellow card) 49', (goal) 66'; Higuita (yellow card) 69'; Baptista 90+1', (yellow card) 90+1'	Report	Alashe (yellow card) 37'; Francis (yellow card) 39'; Bernárdez (yellow card) 46'; Barrett 85'; Salinas 90+4'	Stadium: Camping World Stadium; Attendance: 37,194; Referee: Robert Sibiga

June 25 Round 16	San Jose Earthquakes	1–1	LA Galaxy	Stanford, California
19:00 PDT	Barrett 90'	Report	Van Damme (yellow card) 45+1' do Santos 69' do Santos (yellow card) 89'; Cole (yellow card) 90+6' (yellow-red card) 90+7'	Stadium: Stanford Stadium; Attendance: 50,816; Referee: Kevin Stott

July 1 Round 17	Chicago Fire	1–0	San Jose Earthquakes	Bridgeview, Illinois
17:00 PDT	Stephens (yellow card) 53'; Goossens 58'; LaBrocca (yellow card) 90+3'	Report	Dawkins (yellow card) 10'; Francis (yellow card) 49'; Alashe (yellow card) 66'	Stadium: Toyota Park; Attendance: 16,487; Referee: Jose Carlos Rivero

July 8 Round 18	San Jose Earthquakes	0–1	FC Dallas	San Jose, California
19:30 PDT	Quintero (yellow card) 29'; Godoy (yellow card) 59'	Report	Hedges (yellow card) 31'; Urruti 51'; Díaz (yellow card) 61'; Harris (yellow card) 72'	Stadium: Avaya Stadium; Attendance: 18,000; Referee: Juan Guzman

July 16 Round 19	San Jose Earthquakes	2–1	Toronto FC	San Jose, California
19:30 PDT	Amarikwa 30'; Alashe (yellow card) 33'; Godoy (red card) 42'; Quintero (red card) 53'; Dawkins 70'	Report	Morrow 44'	Stadium: Avaya Stadium; Attendance: 18,000; Referee: Alejandro Mariscal

July 22 Round 20	Real Salt Lake	1–1	San Jose Earthquakes	Salt Lake City, Utah
20:00 PDT	Beltran (yellow card) 30'; Mulholland 64'	Report	Wondolowski 9'	Stadium: Rio Tinto Stadium; Attendance: 19,842; Referee: Jair Marrufo

July 31 Round 21	Houston Dynamo	1–1	San Jose Earthquakes	Houston, Texas
18:00 PDT	Mansally (yellow card) 17'; Alex (yellow card) 40', (goal) 45+2'	Report	Wondolowski 59'; Stewart (yellow card) 90'	Stadium: BBVA Compass Stadium; Attendance: 15,045; Referee: Alan Kelly

August 5 Round 22	San Jose Earthquakes	0–0	New York City FC	San Jose, California
20:00 PDT		Report		Stadium: Avaya Stadium; Attendance: 18,000; Referee: Ricardo Salazar

August 12 Round 23	Vancouver Whitecaps FC	1–2	San Jose Earthquakes	Vancouver, British Columbia
20:00 PDT	Mezquida 90+4'	Report	Amarikwa 14'; Alashe (yellow card) 54'; Dawkins 60'	Stadium: BC Place; Attendance: 22,120; Referee: Drew Fischer

August 19 Round 24	San Jose Earthquakes	1–2	Houston Dynamo	San Jose, California
20:00 PDT	Stewart (yellow card) 48'; Bernardez 54', (yellow card) 55'	Report	Clark 6'; Anibaba (yellow card) 18'; Horst 50'; Willis (yellow card) 54'; García (yellow card) 86'	Stadium: Avaya Stadium; Attendance: 18,000; Referee: Robert Sibiga

August 24 Round 25	San Jose Earthquakes	0–0	New England Revolution	San Jose, California
19:30 PDT	Godoy (yellow card) 25'; Ceren (yellow card) 54'; Dawkins (yellow card) 75'	Report	Koffie (yellow card) 82'; Bunbury (yellow card) 87'	Stadium: Avaya Stadium; Attendance: 18,000; Referee: Hilario Grajeda

August 27 Round 26	Columbus Crew SC	2–0	San Jose Earthquakes	Columbus, Ohio
16:30 PDT	Finlay 32'; Meram 84' (pen.)	Report	Ceren (yellow card) 65'	Stadium: Mapfre Stadium; Attendance: 20,031; Referee: Ismail Elfath

September 10 Round 27	San Jose Earthquakes	1–1	Seattle Sounders FC	San Jose, California
19:30 PDT	Wondolowski 20'; Stewart (yellow card) 44'; Dawkins (yellow card) 58'; Wynne (yellow card) 69'; Quintero (yellow card) 84'		Alonso (yellow card) 54'; Lodeiro 80'	Stadium: Avaya Stadium; Attendance: 18,000; Referee: Baldomero Toledo

September 17 Round 28	Colorado Rapids	0–0	San Jose Earthquakes	Commerce City, Colorado
18:00 PDT	Cronin (yellow card) 35'; Powers (yellow card) 38'; Sjoberg (yellow card) 38'	Report		Stadium: Dick's Sporting Goods Park; Attendance: 17645; Referee: Armando Villarreal

September 24 Round 29	San Jose Earthquakes	1–2	Sporting Kansas City	San Jose, California
19:30 PDT	Dawkins 42'; Ceren (yellow card) 57'; Goitom (yellow card) 80'	Report	Dwyer 7'; Nagamura (yellow card) 52'; Espinoza (yellow card) 64'; Ellis 81'; Melia (yellow card) 84'	Stadium: Avaya Stadium; Attendance: 18,000; Referee: Edvin Jurisevic

September 28 Round 30	Montreal Impact	3–1	San Jose Earthquakes	Montreal, Quebec
16:30 PDT	Francis (yellow card) 12'; Wondolowski 62'	Report	Oduro 22'; Piatti 32'; Camara (yellow card) 50'; Cabrera (yellow card) 56'; Piatti (yellow card) 86'; Venegas (yellow card) 86'; Drogba (yellow card) 90'; Venegas 90'	Stadium: Saputo Stadium; Attendance: 16,318; Referee: Sorin Stoica

October 1 Round 31	San Jose Earthquakes	2–1	Real Salt Lake	San Jose, California
19:30 PDT				Stadium: Avaya Stadium

October 13 Round 32	Colorado Rapids	2–1	San Jose Earthquakes	Commerce City, Colorado
18:00 PDT				Stadium: Dick's Sporting Goods Park

October 16 Round 33	San Jose Earthquakes	0–0	Vancouver Whitecaps FC	San Jose, California
16:00 PDT				Stadium: Avaya Stadium

October 23 Round 34	Sporting Kansas City	2–0	San Jose Earthquakes	Kansas City, Kansas
13:00 PDT				Stadium: Children's Mercy Park

=== U.S. Open Cup ===
Win Draw Loss Upcoming fixture

June 15, 2016 4	Portland Timbers	2–0	San Jose Earthquakes	Portland, Oregon
19:30 (PST)	Asprilla 34'; McInerney 40'; Peay (yellow card) 71'	Report	Jahn (yellow card) 83'; Stewart (yellow card) 88'	Stadium: Providence Park; Attendance: 16,834; Referee: Allen Chapman
