= 2015 San Jose Earthquakes season =

San Jose Earthquakes
2015 season
- Owner: Earthquakes Soccer, LLC
- Coach: Dominic Kinnear
- Stadium: Avaya Stadium (Primary); Levi's Stadium (1 League game); Stanford Stadium (1 League game)
- Major League Soccer: Conference: 7th Overall: 13th
- MLS Cup Playoffs: Did not qualify
- U.S. Open Cup: Fifth round
- California Clásico: 1st (2–0–1)
- Heritage Cup: 1st (1–1–0)
- Central California Cup: 2nd (0–1–0)
- Rose City Invitational: 2nd (2–1–0)
- Top goalscorer: League: Chris Wondolowski (11); All: Chris Wondolowski (13)
- Highest home attendance: 50,422 (June 27 vs. Los Angeles, at Stanford Stadium)
- Lowest home attendance: League: 18,000 (Multiple games, Avaya Stadium capacity); All: 13,196 (June 18 vs. Sacramento)
- Average home league attendance: League: 21,037; All: 19,694
Home colors	Away colors

The 2015 San Jose Earthquakes season was the club's 33rd year of existence, their 17th season in Major League Soccer and their 8th consecutive season in the top-flight of American soccer. It was the club's first season playing in Avaya Stadium, their new soccer-specific stadium in San Jose, California.

== Club ==
=== Roster ===
As of July 6, 2015.

No.	Position	Nation	Player
1	GK	USA	David Bingham
3	DF	ENG	Jordan Stewart
4	MF	USA	Marvell Wynne
5	DF	HON	Víctor Bernárdez (Vice-Captain)
6	MF	USA	Shea Salinas
7	MF	TRI	Cordell Cato
8	FW	USA	Chris Wondolowski (DP & Captain)
10	MF	ARG	Matías Pérez García (DP)
11	FW	SUI	Innocent Emeghara (DP)
12	FW	USA	Mark Sherrod
14	FW	USA	Adam Jahn
15	MF	USA	J. J. Koval
17	MF	GAM	Sanna Nyassi
19	FW	USA	Mike Fucito
20	DF	JAM	Shaun Francis
21	DF	USA	Clarence Goodson
22	FW	USA	Tommy Thompson (HGP)
23	MF	ARG	Leandro Barrera
24	FW	USA	Steven Lenhart
27	MF	USA	Fatai Alashe
35	GK	USA	Bryan Meredith
38	DF	POR	Paulo Renato
80	MF	FRA	Jean-Baptiste Pierazzi

== Non-competitive ==
=== Arizona friendlies ===
February 4	San Jose Earthquakes	2–3	Houston Dynamo	Tucson, Arizona
09:00 PST	Jahn 28', 57'	Report	Lovejoy 13'; Barnes 40'; Horst 53'	Stadium: Kino Sports Complex; Referee: Ricardo Salazar

February 7	San Jose Earthquakes	1–1	Vancouver Whitecaps FC	Tucson, Arizona
16:30 PST	Trialist 29'; Barklage (red card) 83'	Report	Watson (yellow card) 34'; Manneh 66'	Stadium: Kino Sports Complex

February 10	San Jose Earthquakes	0–0	Portland Timbers	Tucson, Arizona
09:30 PST		Report		Stadium: Kino Sports Complex

=== Las Vegas Pro Soccer Challenge Cup ===
February 15	San Jose Earthquakes	2–0	Colorado Rapids	Las Vegas, Nevada
19:00 PST	Wondolowski 43'; Harden (yellow card) 47'; Koval 75'	Report	Cronin (yellow card) 38'	Stadium: Cashman Field

=== California friendlies ===
February 21	Sacramento Republic	0–1	San Jose Earthquakes	Sacramento, California
17:00 PST	Duckett (yellow card) 28'; Mirković (yellow card) 59'; Klimenta (yellow card) 76'	Report	Salinas (yellow card) 25'; García 51'	Stadium: Bonney Field; Attendance: 9,794

February 28	San Jose Earthquakes	3–2	LA Galaxy	San Jose, California
09:30 PST	Gonzalez 42' (o.g.); Alashe (yellow card) 53'; Koval 58'; Jahn 67'	Report	Villareal 65'; Keane 82'	Stadium: Avaya Stadium; Attendance: 18,134

=== International Champions Cup ===
July 14 2015 International Champions Cup	San Jose Earthquakes	1–2	América	San Jose, California
19:30 PST	Goodson 23'	Report	Andrade 76'; Rivera 83'	Stadium: Avaya Stadium; Attendance: 18,000; Referee: Alejandro Mariscal (United States)

July 21 2015 International Champions Cup	San Jose Earthquakes	1–3	Manchester United	San Jose, California
16:00 PST	Alashe 42'	Report	Mata 32'; Depay 37'; Pereira 61'	Stadium: Avaya Stadium; Attendance: 18,000; Referee: Juan Guzman (United States)
Note: Game originally scheduled to be played at California Memorial Stadium.

== Competitive ==
=== Major League Soccer ===
==== Standings ====
Western Conference Table

Pos	Team	Pld	W	L	T	GF	GA	GD	Pts	Qualification
5	LA Galaxy	34	14	11	9	56	46	+10	51	MLS Cup Knockout Round
6	Sporting Kansas City	34	14	11	9	48	45	+3	51	MLS Cup Knockout Round
7	San Jose Earthquakes	34	13	13	8	41	39	+2	47	
8	Houston Dynamo	34	11	14	9	42	49	−7	42	
9	Real Salt Lake	34	11	15	8	38	48	−10	41	

Source: MLS

Overall Table

Pos	Team	Pld	W	L	T	GF	GA	GD	Pts
11	New England Revolution	34	14	12	8	48	47	+1	50
12	Toronto FC	34	15	15	4	58	58	0	49
13	San Jose Earthquakes	34	13	13	8	41	39	+2	47
14	Orlando City SC	34	12	14	8	46	56	−10	44
15	Houston Dynamo	34	11	14	9	42	49	−7	42

Source: MLS
Rules for classification: 1) points; 2) total wins; 3) total goal differential; 4) total goals scored

==== Results ====
March 7 Round 1	FC Dallas	1–0	San Jose Earthquakes	Frisco, Texas
17:30 PDT	Harris (yellow card) 50'; Pérez 90+2'		Francis (yellow card) 67'; Salinas (yellow card) 77'; Nyassi (yellow card) 90+2'; Jahn (yellow card) 90+4'	Stadium: Toyota Stadium; Attendance: 15,236; Referee: Ted Unkel

March 14 Round 2	Seattle Sounders FC	2–3	San Jose Earthquakes	Seattle, Washington
19:00 PDT	Dempsey 1'; Azira (yellow card) 57'; Martins 84'; Roldan (yellow card) 90+4'	Report	Wondolowski 13', 48'; Bernárdez (red card) 52'; Innocent 70', (yellow card) 85'	Stadium: CenturyLink Field; Attendance: 39,175; Referee: Baldomero Toledo

March 22 Round 3	San Jose Earthquakes	2–1	Chicago Fire	San Jose, California
16:00 PDT	Alashe 5'; Harden 21'	Report	Polster (yellow card) 26'; Shipp 29'	Stadium: Avaya Stadium; Attendance: 18,000

March 28 Round 4	New England Revolution	2–1	San Jose Earthquakes	Foxborough, Massachusetts
12:00 PDT	Rowe 21', 37'	Report	Goodson (yellow card) 13'; Francis (yellow card) 57'; Wondolowski 62' (pen.)	Stadium: Gillette Stadium; Attendance: 10,668

April 5 Round 5	San Jose Earthquakes	0–1	Real Salt Lake	San Jose, California
14:00 PDT	Innocent (yellow card) 43'; Wondolowski (yellow card) 60'; Alashe (yellow card) 90+3'	Report	Morales 44'; García (yellow card) 73'; Mansally (yellow card) 82'	Stadium: Avaya Stadium; Attendance: 18,000

April 11 Round 6	San Jose Earthquakes	1–0	Vancouver Whitecaps FC	San Jose, California
19:30 PDT	Bingham (yellow card) 11'; Nyassi 75'; Jahn (red card) 88'	Report	Mattocks (yellow card) 3'; Manneh (yellow card) 26'; Kah (yellow card) 32'; Flores (yellow card) 61'; Morales (red card) 88'; Waston (yellow card) 90+3'	Stadium: Avaya Stadium; Attendance: 18,000

April 17 Round 7	New York Red Bulls	2–0	San Jose Earthquakes	Harrison, New Jersey
16:00 PDT	Perrinelle (yellow card) 11'; Kljestan 29'; Grella 35'	Report	Alashe (yellow card) 36'; Nyassi (yellow card) 54'	Stadium: Red Bull Arena; Attendance: 16,406

May 1 Round 8	Real Salt Lake	1–1	San Jose Earthquakes	Sandy, Utah
19:00 PDT	Beckerman (yellow card) 1'; Allen (yellow card) 48'; Bernárdez 71' (o.g.)	Report	Wondolowski 19'; Innocent (yellow card) 21'	Stadium: Rio Tinto Stadium; Attendance: 19,715

May 5 Round 9	Houston Dynamo	0–1	San Jose Earthquakes	Houston, Texas
17:30 PDT	Clark (yellow card) 26'; Sarkodie (yellow card) 79'	Report	Jahn 54'; Stewart (yellow card) 75'	Stadium: BBVA Compass Stadium; Attendance: 16,018

May 8 Round 10	Colorado Rapids	1–1	San Jose Earthquakes	Commerce City, Colorado
19:00 PDT	Moor (yellow card) 26'; Cronin (yellow card) 52'; Riley 90+3'	Report	Wondolowski 19'; Bingham (yellow card) 90+1'	Stadium: Dick's Sporting Goods Park; Attendance: 14,169

May 16 Round 11	San Jose Earthquakes	2–0	Columbus Crew	San Jose, California
19:30 PDT	Goodson (yellow card) 40'; García (yellow card) 45+2'; Wondolowski 55'; Salinas 60'	Report	Saeid (yellow card) 14' (yellow-red card) 33'; George (yellow card) 90+1'	Stadium: Avaya Stadium; Attendance: 18,000

May 24 Round 12	San Jose Earthquakes	1–1	Orlando City SC	Santa Clara, California
16:00 PDT	Alashe (yellow card) 44'; Wondolowski 68' (pen.)	Report	Shea (red card) 51'; Kaká 64' (pen.); Paterson (yellow card) 85'	Stadium: Levi's Stadium; Attendance: 36,224

May 30 Round 13	Toronto FC	3–1	San Jose Earthquakes	Toronto, Ontario
14:00 PDT	Morrow 22'; Creavalle 33'; Moore 71'	Report	Wondolowski 24' (pen.); Nyassi (yellow card) 55'	Stadium: BMO Field; Attendance: 17,711

June 7 Round 14	San Jose Earthquakes	0–0	FC Dallas	San Jose, California
16:00 PDT	Wynne (yellow card) 11'; Sherrod (red card) 53'; Koval (red card) 87'	Report	Ulloa (yellow card) 16'; Michel (yellow card) 40'; Díaz (yellow card) 40'; Watson (red card) 75'	Stadium: Avaya Stadium; Attendance: 18,000

June 20 Round 15	Seattle Sounders FC	0–2	San Jose Earthquakes	Seattle, Washington
13:00 PDT	Thomás (yellow card) 59'; Scott (yellow card) 87'	Report	Nyassi (yellow card) 23', (goal) 28'; García 73'	Stadium: CenturyLink Field; Attendance: 39,971

June 27 Round 16	San Jose Earthquakes	3–1	LA Galaxy	Stanford, California
19:30 PDT	Nyassi (yellow card) 13'; Bernárdez (yellow card) 23'; Wondolowski 28'; Goodson 53'; Cato 72'	Report	Juninho 17'; Ishizaki (yellow card) 19'; Gordon (yellow card) 88'	Stadium: Stanford Stadium; Attendance: 50,422

July 5 Round 17	Portland Timbers	1–0	San Jose Earthquakes	Portland, Oregon
14:00 PDT	Jewsbury 91'	Report	Goodson (yellow card) 51'; Sherrod (yellow card) 75'	Stadium: Providence Park; Attendance: 21,144

July 10 Round 18	San Jose Earthquakes	0–2	Houston Dynamo	San Jose, California
20:00 PDT		Report	Clark 10'; Deric (yellow card) 31'; Beasley (yellow card) 37'; Rodríguez (yellow card) 45+2'; Sturgis (yellow card) 45+3'; Bruin 81'	Stadium: Avaya Stadium; Attendance: 18,000; Referee: (United States) Sorin Stoica

July 17 Round 19	LA Galaxy	5–2	San Jose Earthquakes	Carson, California
20:00 PDT	Keane 30' (pen.), 64', 80' (pen.); Rogers (yellow card) 36'; Gerrard 37'; Lletget 90+2'	Report	Amarikwa 22', 25'; Thompson (yellow card) 30'; Salinas (yellow card) 55'; Bingham (yellow card) 69'; Stewart (yellow card) 70'	Stadium: StubHub Center; Attendance: 27,000; Referee: (United States) Alan Kelly

July 26 Round 20	Vancouver Whitecaps FC	3–1	San Jose Earthquakes	Vancouver, British Columbia
16:00 PDT	Rosales 5'; Waston 32'; Koffie (yellow card) 37'; Rivero 56' (pen.); Mezquida (yellow card) 60'; Teibert (yellow card) 90'	Summary	Amarikwa (yellow card) 45' (goal) 90'	Stadium: BC Place; Attendance: 20,298; Referee: (United States) Edvin Jurisevic

August 2 Round 21	San Jose Earthquakes	0–0	Portland Timbers	San Jose, California
20:00 PDT	Francis (yellow card) 14'; Stewart (yellow card) 88'	Recap		Stadium: Avaya Stadium; Attendance: 18,000; Referee: (United States) Kevin Stott

August 8 Round 22	Houston Dynamo	2–1	San Jose Earthquakes	Houston, Texas
18:00 PDT	Beasley 55'; Raúl Rodríguez (yellow card) 71'; Alex 76'	Summary	Bernárdez (yellow card) 28'; Pelosi (yellow card) 34'; Alashe (yellow card) 43' (yellow-red card); Amarikwa 70'; Nyassi (yellow card) 82'	Stadium: BBVA Compass Stadium; Attendance: 21,876; Referee: (United States) Fotis Bazakos

August 14 Round 23	San Jose Earthquakes	1–0	Colorado Rapids	San Jose, California
20:00 PDT	Bernárdez (yellow card) 49'; Goodson 53'; Pelosi (yellow card) 88'	Report	Burling (yellow card) 65'; Cronin (yellow card) 74'; Goodson (yellow card) 51'; Figueroa (yellow card) 84'	Stadium: Avaya Stadium; Attendance: 18,000; Referee: (United States) Allen Chapman

August 19 Round 24	Sporting Kansas City	0–5	San Jose Earthquakes	Kansas City, Kansas
17:30 PDT	Feilhaber (red card) 71'; Németh (yellow card) 74'	Report	Cato 3', 58'; Wondolowski 17' (pen.), 61'; Godoy 23'	Stadium: Sporting Park; Attendance: 18,866; Referee: (United States) Jair Marrufo

August 22 Round 25	D.C. United	0–2	San Jose Earthquakes	Washington, D.C.
16:00 PDT		Report	Wondolowski 4'; Salinas 52'; Godoy (yellow card) 89'	Stadium: RFK Stadium; Attendance: 20,043; Referee: (United States) Alan Kelly

August 28 Round 26	San Jose Earthquakes	1–0	LA Galaxy	San Jose, California
20:00 PDT	Salinas 18'; Bernárdez (yellow card) 90'	Report	Leonardo (red card) 47'; Rodgers (yellow card) 74'	Stadium: Avaya Stadium; Attendance: 18,000; Referee: (United States) Jose Carlos Rivero

September 5 Round 27	San Jose Earthquakes	1–2	Philadelphia Union	San Jose, California
19:30 PDT	Goodson (yellow card) 52'; Wondolowski 64'	Report	Fabinho (yellow card) 63'; Casey 74', 86', (yellow card) 79'	Stadium: Avaya Stadium; Attendance: 18,000; Referee: Ismail Elfath

September 12 Round 28	San Jose Earthquakes	1–1	Seattle Sounders FC	San Jose, California
19:30 PDT	Godoy (yellow card) 29'; Alashe (yellow card) 37', (goal) 70'; Wondolowski (yellow card) 90+6'	Report	Pineda (yellow card) 55'; Fisher (yellow card) 69'; Martins 82'	Stadium: Avaya Stadium; Attendance: 18,000; Referee: Jorge Gonzalez

September 16 Round 29	San Jose Earthquakes	1–1	Montreal Impact	San Jose, California
19:30 PDT	Wondolowski 35'; Pelosi (yellow card) 75'	Report	Oyongo (red card) 49'; Bekker 65'; Kronberg (yellow card) 84'	Stadium: Avaya Stadium; Attendance: 18,000; Referee: Allen Chapman

September 19 Round 30	New York City FC	3–2	San Jose Earthquakes	New York, New York
16:00 PDT	Pirlo (yellow card) 32'; Allen (yellow card) 44'; Grabavoy 51', 63'; Villa 65'; Wingert (yellow card) 66'; Jacobsen (yellow card) 86'	Report	Gpodson (yellow card) 34'; Pelosi (yellow card) 45+1'; Amarikwa 72'; Wondolowski 76'	Stadium: Yankee Stadium; Attendance: 28,231; Referee: Edvin Jurisevic

September 27 Round 31	San Jose Earthquakes	1–0	Real Salt Lake	San Jose, California
16:00 PDT	Godoy (yellow card) 34'; Pelosi (yellow card) 73'; Wondolowski (yellow card) 74'; García (yellow card) 77' (yellow-red card) 88', (goal) 87'	Report	Beckerman (yellow card) 63'; Beltran (yellow card) 84'; Aaron Maund (yellow card) 90'	Stadium: Avaya Stadium; Attendance: 18,000; Referee: Chris Penso

October 3 Round 32	San Jose Earthquakes	1–1	Vancouver Whitecaps FC	San Jose, California
19:30 PDT	Goodson (yellow card) 27'; Godoy (yellow card) 37'; Wondolowski 62'; Bernárdez (yellow card) 66'	Report	Techera 39'; Beitashour (yellow card) 60'; Laba (yellow card) 80'	Stadium: Avaya Stadium; Attendance: 18,000; Referee: Sorin Stoica

October 16 Round 33	San Jose Earthquakes	1-0	Sporting Kansas City	San Jose, California
20:00 PDT	Godoy 47', (yellow card) 67'	Report	Okugo (yellow card) 69'	Stadium: Avaya Stadium; Attendance: 18,000; Referee: Kevin Stott

October 25 Round 34	FC Dallas	2-1	San Jose Earthquakes	Frisco, Texas
16:00 PDT	Díaz 38', (yellow card) 67'; Ulloa 79'	Report	Amarikwa 13'; Bernárdez (yellow card) 26'; García (red card) 67'; Pelosi (yellow card) 71'; Goodson (yellow card) 74'	Stadium: Toyota Stadium; Attendance: 16,937; Referee: Armando Villarreal

=== U.S. Open Cup ===
San Jose will enter the 2015 U.S. Open Cup with the rest of Major League Soccer in the fourth round.

June 18, 2015 Round 4	San Jose Earthquakes (California)	2–2 (6–5 p)	(California) Sacramento Republic	San Jose, California
19:30 PT	Wondolowski 74', 79'; Bernardez (yellow card) 105'	Report	López 6' (pen.); Klimenta 54'	Stadium: Avaya Stadium; Attendance: 13,196; Referee: Alex Chilowicz
	Penalties
	Wondolowski (penalty scored); Bernardez (penalty scored); Stephenson (penalty missed); Pierazzi (penalty missed); Thompson (penalty scored); Koval (penalty scored); Barrera (penalty scored); Francis (penalty scored)		(penalty scored) López; (penalty scored) Vuković; (penalty missed) Daly; (penalty scored) Gilberto; (penalty missed) Klimenta; (penalty scored) Estrada; (penalty scored) Gabeljic; (penalty missed) Kiffe

July 1, 2015 Round 5	San Jose Earthquakes (California)	0–1	(California) LA Galaxy	San Jose, California
19:30 PT			Jose Villarreal	Stadium: Avaya Stadium; Attendance: 13,329

== transfers in ==
- F Kris Tyrpak (11/19/14 - Dispersal Draft)
- M Leandro Barrera (12/10/14 - Waiver Draft)
- F Mark Sherrod (12/11/14 - trade from Orlando City)
- GK Andy Gruenebaum (12/12/14 - Re-Entry Stage 1 Draft)
- D Marvell Wynne (12/18/14 - Re-Entry Stage 2 Draft)
- M Sanna Nyassi (12/18/14 - Re-Entry Stage 2 Draft)
- M Fatai Alashe (1/15/15 - SuperDraft)
- F Innocent Emeghara (1/31/15 - free)
- D Paulo Renato (2/26/15 - free)
- GK Tomas Gomez (3/26/15 - free)
- F Quincy Amarikwa (6/26/15 - trade from Chicago)
- M Matheus Silva (7/15/15 - waivers)
- M Marc Pelosi (7/17/15 - Allocation)
- M Anibal Godoy (8/6/15 - signed from Budapest Honved)
- M Khari Stephenson (9/11/15 - returned from loan

== transfers out ==
- D Jason Hernandez (12/10/14 - Expansion Draft: to NYCFC)
- GK Jon Busch (12/11/14 - out of contract)
- D Andreas Gorlitz (12/11/14 - option declined)
- GK Billy Knutsen (12/11/14 - option declined)
- D Tommy Muller (12/11/14 - option declined)
- F Billy Schuler (12/11/14 - option declined: to Whitecaps FC 2)
- M Atiba Harris (12/18/14 - Re-Entry Stage 2 Draft: to FC Dallas)
- M Yannick Djalo (12/31/14 - loan expired: to Benfica)
- M Sam Cronin (1/19/15 - traded: to Colorado)
- GK Andy Gruenebaum (retired)
- F Kris Tyrpak (2/26/15 - waived: to Austin Aztex)
- D Brandon Barklage (3/18/15 - mutual contract termination:to Saint Louis FC )
- D Ty Harden (6/26/15 - traded: to Chicago)
- M Khari Stephenson (8/5/15 - loaned: to San Antonio)
