= Chris Wondolowski =

American soccer player (born 1983)

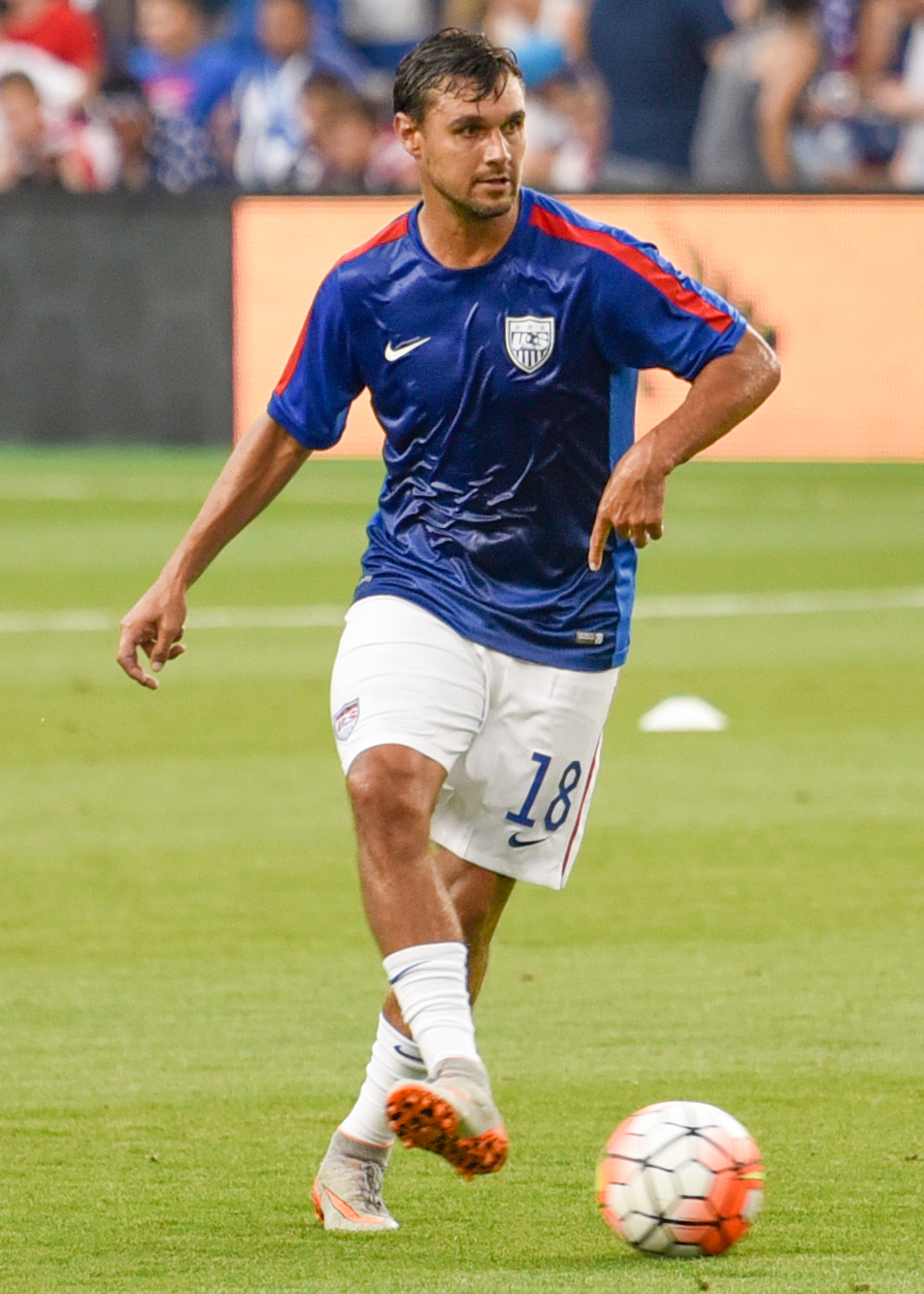
- Wondolowski with the United States at the 2015 CONCACAF Gold Cup

Personal information
- Full name: Christopher Elliott Wondolowski
- Date of birth: January 28, 1983 (age 43)
- Place of birth: Danville, California, United States
- Height: 6 ft 0 in (1.83 m)
- Position: Forward

Youth career
- De La Salle High School

College career
Years	Team	Apps	(Gls)
2001–2004	Chico State Wildcats	84	(39)

Senior career*
Years	Team	Apps	(Gls)
2004	Chico Rooks	16	(17)
2005	San Jose Earthquakes	2	(0)
2006–2009	Houston Dynamo	37	(4)
2009–2021	San Jose Earthquakes	374	(167)
Total		429	(188)

International career
2011–2016	United States	35	(11)
Medal record
Representing United States
Men's soccer
CONCACAF Gold Cup
Winner	2013 United States
Runner-up	2011 United States
CONCACAF Cup
Runner-up	2015 United States
- * Club domestic league appearances and goals

Christopher Elliott Wondolowski (born January 28, 1983) is an American former professional soccer player who played as a forward. He was the Major League Soccer (MLS)'s top scorer in the 2010 and 2012 seasons, also being named the 2012 Most Valuable Player, and was one of the most prominent strikers during his time playing in the MLS. With 171 goals in Major League Soccer, he is the highest scorer in the competition's history, as well as the only player in league history to score 150 or more regular-season goals.

A college soccer player for the Chico State Wildcats, he played in 2004 for the Chico Rooks and was drafted to the San Jose Earthquakes in 2005. The team became the Houston Dynamo the following season, and he played a part in their MLS Cup wins in 2006 and 2007 before returning to the re-established Earthquakes in 2009. As of September 2019, Wondolowski is also the only player in league history to have scored ten or more goals in ten consecutive seasons. He also holds the record for most MLS goals on the road and MLS game winning goals (both home and away). In November 2021, Wondolowski announced his retirement from professional soccer. His scoring ability and playing style made him well known as a poacher.

A full international between 2011 and 2016, Wondolowski represented the United States at three CONCACAF Gold Cups – winning the 2013 edition – and also played at the 2014 FIFA World Cup.

== Youth and college career ==
Wondolowski played high school soccer at De La Salle High School in Concord, California, where he earned All-Bay Valley Athletic League first team and all-East Bay first-team honors in 2000 and 2001. He was awarded two area "Player of the Year" awards in 2001 by local media. Wondolowski played club soccer for the Diablo Valley Soccer Club (DVSC) and Danville Mustang Soccer Association.

He enjoyed a standout college soccer career at Chico State University, finishing with 39 goals in 84 games. He led the Chico Rooks of the then Men's Premier Soccer League with 17 goals in the 2004 season.

== Club career ==
=== San Jose Earthquakes (2005) ===
Wondolowski was drafted in the fourth round of the 2005 MLS Supplemental Draft with the 41st overall pick by the San Jose Earthquakes. Although he made only two MLS appearances for San Jose in 2005, he led the Earthquakes reserve team in scoring with eight goals in 12 games.

=== Houston Dynamo (2006–2009) ===
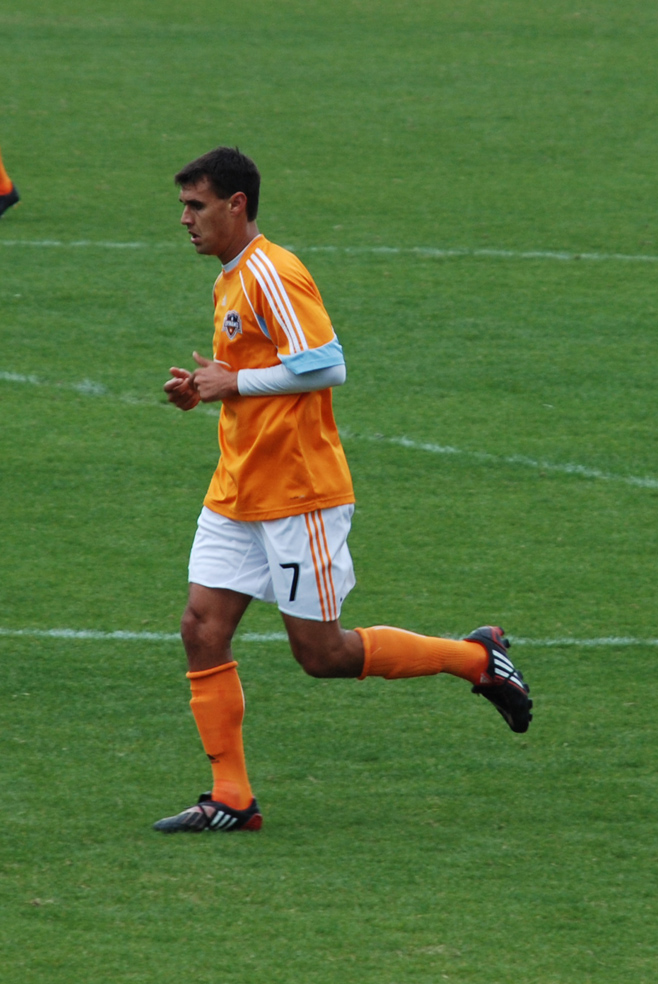
Wondolowski playing for Houston Dynamo in 2009

Along with the rest of his Earthquakes teammates, he moved to Houston for the 2006 season and once again led the reserve team in scoring, tallying 13 goals in 11 games. He scored his first MLS goal on August 30, 2006, against the Chicago Fire.

In 2007, Wondolowski scored against Pachuca in the semifinal round of the CONCACAF Champions' Cup, although Houston was eliminated in the second leg. Wondolowski scored his first US Open Cup goal in a 3–0 victory against FC Dallas on August 23 of that same year. He scored his second career MLS goal – a tap-in against Chicago – on July 12, 2007.

In 2008 Wondolowski continued to make appearances for the reserve squad as well as the first team in various competitions. He captained the team in its US Open Cup loss against Charleston Battery, converting his shot in the penalty shootout as well.

He scored his fourth career goal for Houston against the New York Red Bulls on May 16, 2009.

=== Return to San Jose (2009–2021) ===
Wondolowski was traded to the San Jose Earthquakes in exchange for Cam Weaver in June 2009. With the move to San Jose, Wondolowski began to receive more playing time and appeared in 14 games in which he scored 3 goals for San Jose.

Wondolowski had a break-out season in 2010 in which he led Major League Soccer in scoring with 18 goals in 26 matches, leading San Jose into the MLS Playoffs. The 18 regular season goals scored was the highest in the league, and made for Wondolowski to win his first MLS Golden Boot. He scored his first playoff goal with the series winning goal against New York in their playoff game, propelling San Jose to a 3–2 aggregate win.

Wondolowski's first brace of 2011 started in the fifth minute of play against FC Dallas. After receiving a ball in the box, Wondolowski took the ball off a volley with time to turn and punch the shot past a helpless Kevin Hartman. His second goal would come in just the 23rd minute after Dallas was unable to clear the ball on a set piece. He finished the season with 16 goals, tied with Dwayne De Rosario for 1st overall in scoring but lost the Golden Boot on an assists tie breaker.

San Jose signed Wondolowski to a new contract in February 2012. Terms were undisclosed.

Wondolowski was elected to the 2012 MLS All-Star Game versus Chelsea. He was defended by John Terry, and managed to score in the 21st minute. NBC Sports Network aired an episode of MLS 36 following Wondolowski for 36 hours through his arrival in Philadelphia for the All-Star festivities and the game itself. It shows Terry personally complimenting Wondolowski at halftime on his movement, adding that it was a "nightmare" to cover him. On October 6, 2012, Wondolowski became the San Jose Earthquakes' all-time leading goal-scorer at Colorado Rapids, a night where he notched his fourth career hat-trick. That season he also matched Roy Lassiter's MLS record of 27 goals in a season. The conclusion of the regular season also saw Wondolowski become the first and only MLS player so far to win the Player of the Month award four times in a single season, for his performances during the months of April, June, September, and October.

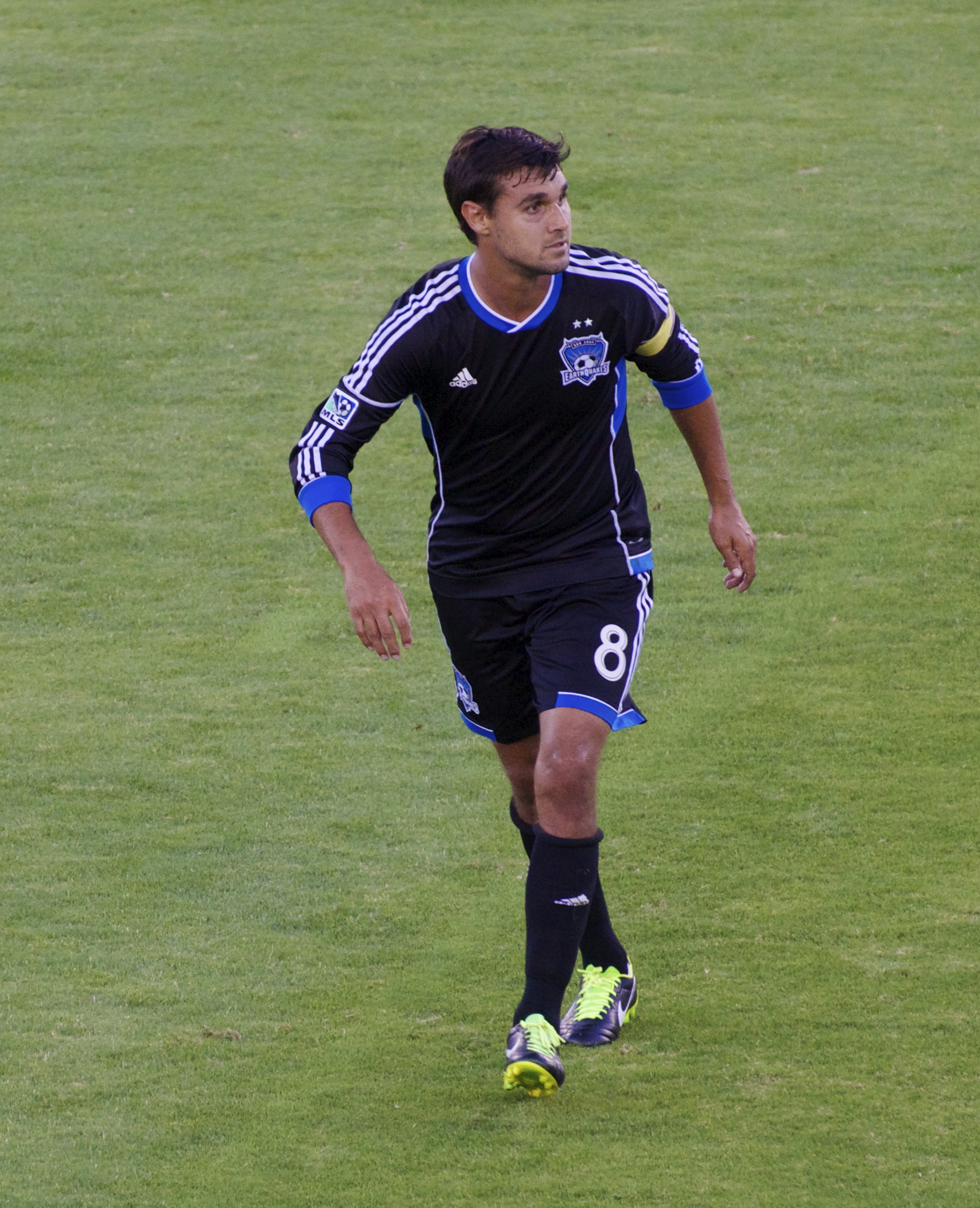
Wondolowski with San Jose Earthquakes in 2013

Wondolowski's high scoring rate fell a bit in 2013 with the striker scoring only 13 goals in all competitions, the lowest total since arriving in San Jose in 2009. The low total may have been partially due to the fact that he played the majority of 2013 with a broken foot.

On August 24, 2014, Wondolowski became the only third MLS player to ever score double digit goal totals for five consecutive seasons, following the lead of Carlos Ruiz and Juan Pablo Angel. Wondolowski finished the season with 14 goals, leading the San Jose Earthquakes for the fifth consecutive season.

On May 24, 2015, Wondolowski drew a penalty against Orlando City SC at Levi's Stadium and scored his hundredth goal in MLS play. He became only the ninth player in MLS history to achieve this feat.

On September 11, 2016, Wondolowski scored his tenth goal of the 2016 season in a 1–1 home draw with Seattle Sounders FC, achieving his seventh consecutive season with ten or more goals and making him the only player in league history to have accomplished this in over five consecutive seasons.

On July 4, 2017, Wondolowski made his 229th career start for San Jose against Atlanta United FC at Bobby Dodd Stadium, surpassing Ramiro Corrales to take the record for most starts made for the club. His 66th minute tally, assisted by Nick Lima, tied him with Landon Donovan for the league record of most goals scored on the road at 63 each, and also marked the 22nd MLS team scored upon by Wondolowski, leaving only expansion side Minnesota United FC.

Wondolowski wore the number 38 in San Jose's U.S. Open Cup quarterfinal match on July 10, 2017, against the LA Galaxy in honor of teammate Matheus Silva, who nearly drowned the week before while swimming at Lake Tahoe. He scored a brace, both goals assisted by Tommy Thompson, to lead the Earthquakes to a 3–2 victory that advanced them to the Cup semifinals for the first time since 2004 and for only the second time in club history.

Wondolowski became the first player in league history to score 10 or more goals in 8 consecutive seasons on August 19, 2017, after converting an equalizing penalty in the final seconds of stoppage time in a 2–2 home draw against the Philadelphia Union, after Joshua Yaro brought down Shea Salinas in the box. On October 22, 2017, he received his seventh overall and fourth consecutive Team MVP award after finishing the 2017 regular season with 13 goals and 8 assists.

On May 18, 2019, Wondolowski scored four goals against the Chicago Fire at Avaya Stadium to tie and break Landon Donovan's goal-scoring record, scoring 148 goals in his 338th MLS appearance.

On November 7, 2021, Wondolowski scored his 171st goal in MLS, and 167th for the Earthquakes, in his final professional match, a 1–1 draw against FC Dallas. He announced his retirement following the contest.

== International career ==
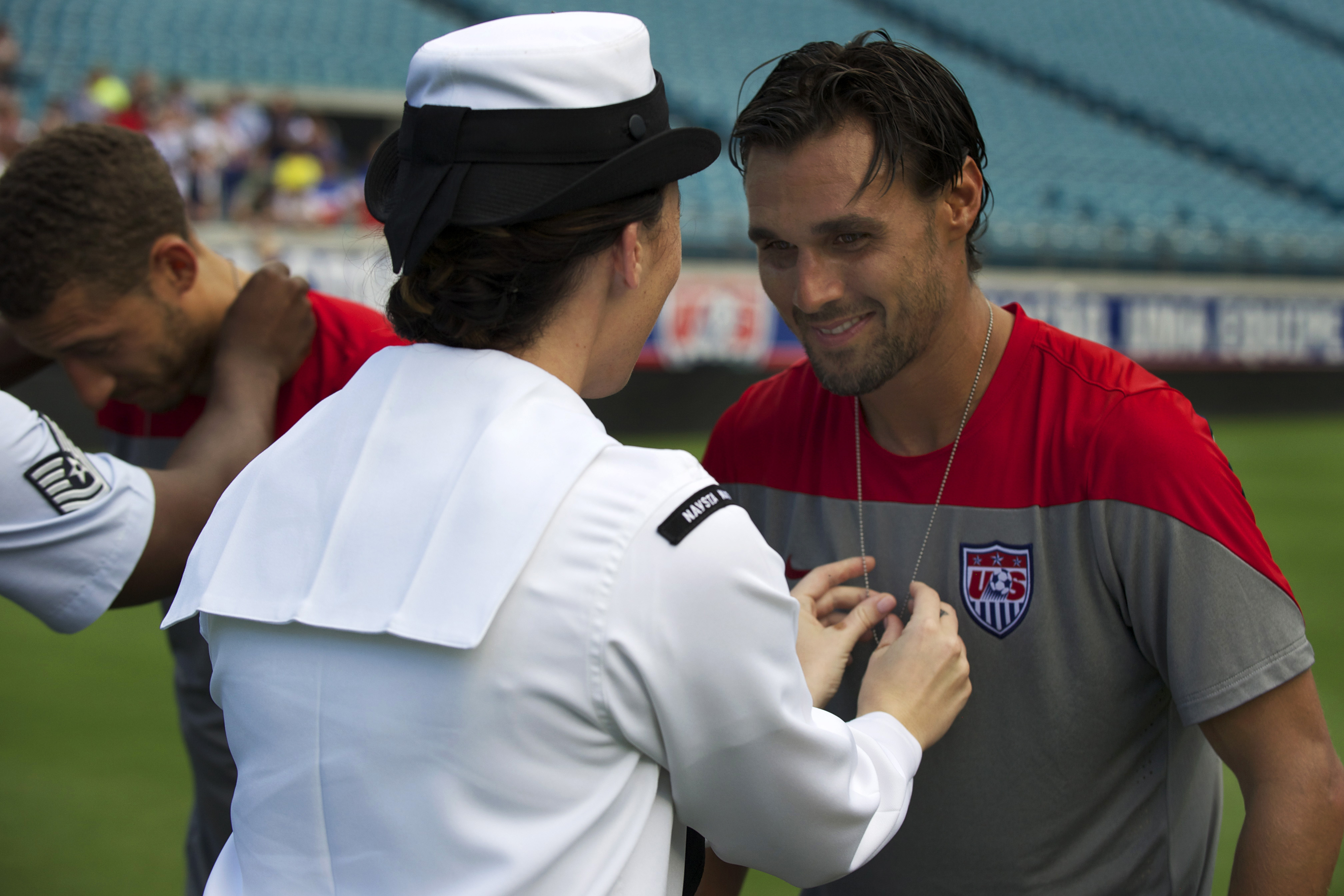
Wondolowski at a ceremony with the U.S. Navy in June 2014

Following his successful stint with the Earthquakes during the 2010 season which included winning the 2010 MLS Golden Boot, Wondolowski was called up to Winter Training Camp with the United States men's national soccer team. At the conclusion of the three-week camp, his first cap with the national team came in a January 22, 2011, friendly against Chile at the Home Depot Center in Carson, California.

On May 23, 2011, Wondolowski was named to the United States roster for the 2011 CONCACAF Gold Cup competition.

In 2012, Wondolowski was called into the United States' initial 27-man roster for a series of three friendlies and the first two World Cup qualifiers for the U.S. Wondolowski made the 23-man roster but only appeared once as a sub in a friendly 0–0 draw against Canada.

On July 5, 2013, Wondolowski scored his first international goal in a match against Guatemala at Qualcomm Stadium in San Diego, California, and four days later, wearing a jersey on which his name was spelled "Wondowlowski", he scored a hat-trick in the first half against Belize at Jeld-Wen Field in Portland, Oregon. He continued his scoring run with a brace against Cuba at Rio Tinto Stadium in Sandy, Utah. On February 1, 2014, Wondolowski added two more goals to his tally, by scoring a brace against South Korea at StubHub Center in Carson, California.

Since the Gold Cup, Wondolowski plays with an extra 'W' on the inside of his shirt when on national team duty. This happened after scoring a hat-trick against Belize while having an extra W on his shirt by mistake.

In 2017, he was named to the preliminary 40-man roster for the Gold Cup, but was not called up during the tournament. On August 27, 2017, he was called up to the 26-man roster for the World Cup qualifiers taking place on September 2, against Costa Rica, and September 5, against Honduras.

=== 2014 FIFA World Cup ===
Wondolowski was selected as one of the final 23 players chosen for the 2014 FIFA World Cup to represent the United States. On June 22, 2014, Wondolowski came in as a substitute for Clint Dempsey in the 87th minute during the Group G game against Portugal. On July 1 he came in as a substitute for Graham Zusi in the 72nd minute in the Group of 16 elimination game against Belgium. In the final minutes of regulation in what was then a 0–0 game, Wondolowski failed to direct his shot on the net from just yards out and Belgium won in extra time. "I'm gutted to have let down everyone but especially my teammates," said Wondolowski about the missed opportunity. In extra time he nearly set up the game tying goal, but the chance was missed by teammate Dempsey.

=== 2016 Copa América Centenario ===
Wondolowski was selected as one of the final 23 players chosen for the Copa América Centenario to represent the United States.

== Personal life ==
Chris is the brother of fellow professional soccer player Stephen Wondolowski. He is of half Native American descent through his mother (Janis Hoyt) who was born into the Kiowa tribe from Oklahoma, of which Chris himself is also a member. His tribal name Bau Daigh, pronounced "Bowe Dye", means "warrior coming over the hill". His paternal grandfather emigrated to the United States at the age of seven with his family that originated from Warsaw, Poland. He married his wife Lindsey in 2009, and their daughter Emersyn was born on December 23, 2013. Their second daughter Brynlee was born on March 10, 2016.

In 2013, Wondolowski was named to the Division II 40th Anniversary Tribute Team, honoring his time spent at Chico State.

== Career statistics ==
=== Club ===
Appearances and goals by club, season and competition
Club	Season	League			Playoffs		Open Cup		SuperLiga		Champions League		Other		Total	
Club	Season	Division	Apps	Goals	Apps	Goals	Apps	Goals	Apps	Goals	Apps	Goals	Apps	Goals	Apps	Goals
Chico Rooks	2004	Men's Premier Soccer League	16	17	1	0	—		—		—		—		17	17
San Jose Earthquakes	2005	Major League Soccer	2	0	—		1	0	—		—		—		3	0
Houston Dynamo	2006	Major League Soccer	6	1	—		3	1	—		—		—		9	2
Houston Dynamo	2007	Major League Soccer	16	1	—		1	0	2	0	3	1	—		22	2
Houston Dynamo	2008	Major League Soccer	8	0	—		1	0	4	0	6	2	—		19	2
Houston Dynamo	2009	Major League Soccer	7	2	—		—		—		1	0	—		8	2
Houston Dynamo	Total		37	4	—		5	1	6	0	10	3	—		58	8
San Jose Earthquakes	2009	Major League Soccer	14	3	—		—		—		—		—		14	3
San Jose Earthquakes	2010	Major League Soccer	28	18	3	1	1	0	—		—		—		32	19
San Jose Earthquakes	2011	Major League Soccer	30	16	—		2	0	—		—		—		32	16
San Jose Earthquakes	2012	Major League Soccer	32	27	2	0	1	0	—		—		—		35	27
San Jose Earthquakes	2013	Major League Soccer	29	11	—		1	0	—		4	2	—		34	13
San Jose Earthquakes	2014	Major League Soccer	26	14	—		—		—		2	0	—		28	14
San Jose Earthquakes	2015	Major League Soccer	31	16	—		1	2	—		—		—		32	18
San Jose Earthquakes	2016	Major League Soccer	30	12	—		—		—		—		—		30	12
San Jose Earthquakes	2017	Major League Soccer	34	13	1	0	4	2	—		—		—		39	15
San Jose Earthquakes	2018	Major League Soccer	34	10	—		1	0	—		—		—		35	10
San Jose Earthquakes	2019	Major League Soccer	32	15	—		2	0	—		—		—		34	15
San Jose Earthquakes	2020	Major League Soccer	22 (Note: Includes three appearances and two goals in the MLS is Back Tournament group stage.)	7	1	1	—		—		—		2 (Note: Appearances in the MLS is Back Tournament knockout stage.)	1	25	9
San Jose Earthquakes	2021	Major League Soccer	32	5	0	0	—		—		—		—		32	5
San Jose Earthquakes	San Jose total		374	167	7	2	13	4	—		6	2	2	1	402	176
Career total			429	188	8	2	19	5	6	0	16	5	2	1	480	201

=== International ===
Appearances and goals by national team and year
National team	Year	Apps	Goals
United States	2011	5	0
United States	2012	3	0
United States	2013	9	6
United States	2014	8	3
United States	2015	6	1
United States	2016	4	1
Total		35	11

International goals
Scores and results list the United States' goal tally first.

No.	Date	Venue	Opponent	Score	Result	Competition
1	July 5, 2013	Qualcomm Stadium, San Diego, United States	Guatemala	3–0	6–0	Friendly
2	July 9, 2013	Jeld-Wen Field, Portland, United States	Belize	1–0	6–1	2013 CONCACAF Gold Cup
3	July 9, 2013	Jeld-Wen Field, Portland, United States	Belize	2–0	6–1	2013 CONCACAF Gold Cup
4	July 9, 2013	Jeld-Wen Field, Portland, United States	Belize	3–1	6–1	2013 CONCACAF Gold Cup
5	July 13, 2013	Rio Tinto Stadium, Sandy, United States	Cuba	3–1	4–1	2013 CONCACAF Gold Cup
6	July 13, 2013	Rio Tinto Stadium, Sandy, United States	Cuba	4–1	4–1	2013 CONCACAF Gold Cup
7	February 1, 2014	StubHub Center, Carson, United States	South Korea	1–0	2–0	Friendly
8	February 1, 2014	StubHub Center, Carson, United States	South Korea	2–0	2–0	Friendly
9	April 2, 2014	University of Phoenix Stadium, Glendale, United States	Mexico	2–0	2–2	Friendly
10	July 3, 2015	Nissan Stadium, Nashville, United States	Guatemala	4–0	4–0	Friendly
11	October 7, 2016	Estadio Pedro Marrero, Havana, Cuba	Cuba	1–0	2–0	Friendly

== Honors ==
United States

- CONCACAF Gold Cup: 2013

Houston Dynamo

- MLS Cup: 2006, 2007

San Jose Earthquakes

- MLS Supporters' Shield: 2005, 2012

Individual

- CONCACAF Gold Cup Golden Boot: 2013
- MLS Landon Donovan MVP Award: 2012
- MLS Golden Boot: 2010, 2012
- MLS Best XI: 2010, 2011, 2012
- MLS All-Star: 2011, 2012, 2013, 2016, 2019
- Most Goals in MLS Regular-Season History (171)
- San Jose Sports Hall of Fame: 2023
- Bay Area Sports Hall of Fame: 2024
- San Jose Earthquakes 50 Greatest Quakes: 2025
- National Soccer Hall of Fame: 2026

Sporting positions
Preceded by Ramiro Corrales	San Jose Earthquakes captain 2014–2021	Incumbent
