= Fatai Alashe =

American soccer player (born 1993)

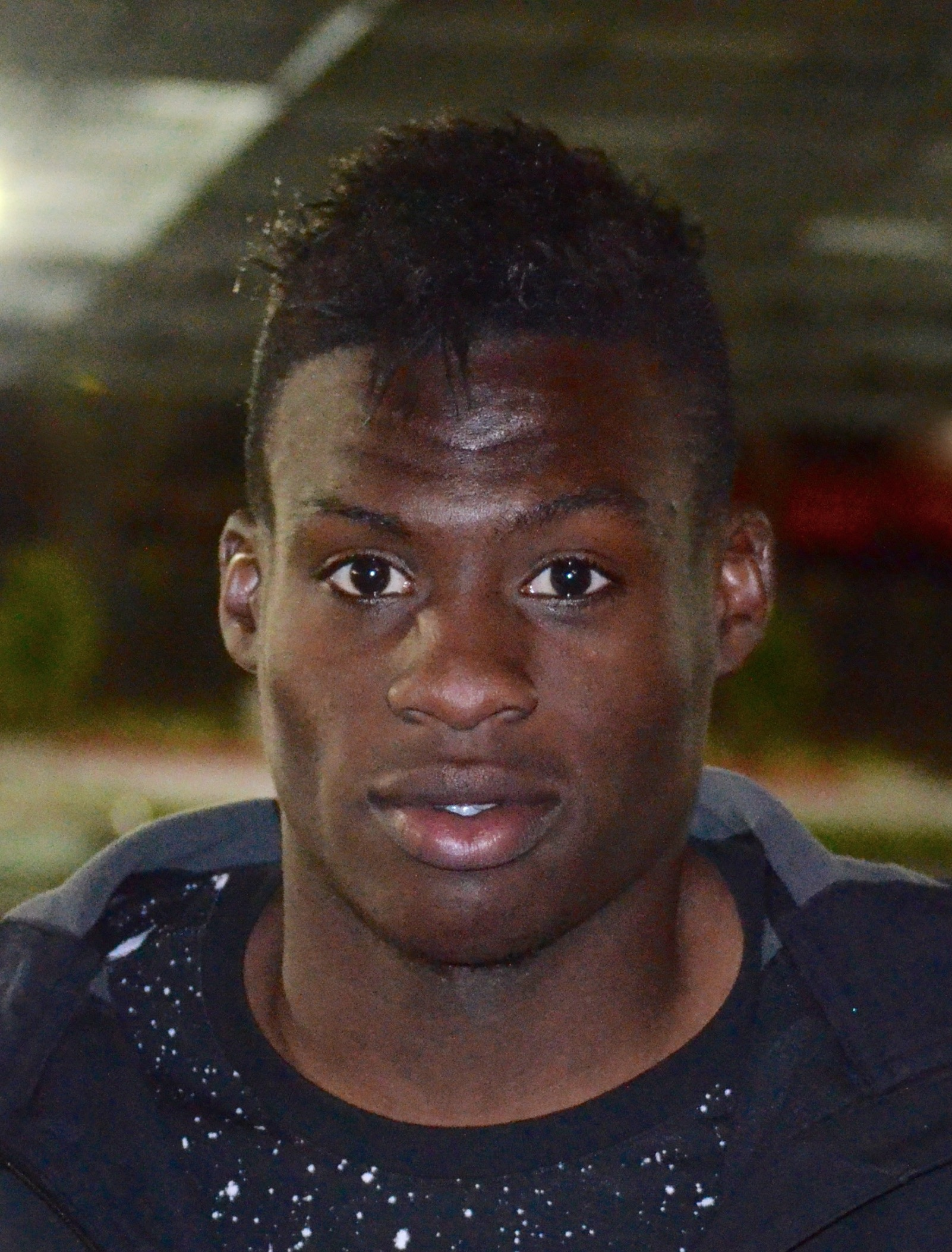

Personal information
- Full name: Abdul-Fatai Alashe
- Date of birth: August 21, 1993 (age 33)
- Place of birth: Southfield, Michigan, United States
- Height: 1.83 m (6 ft 0 in)
- Position: Midfielder

Youth career
- 2008–2011: Vardar SC

College career
Years	Team	Apps	(Gls)
2011–2014	Michigan State Spartans	86	(8)

Senior career*
Years	Team	Apps	(Gls)
2013	Reading United	9	(1)
2014	Portland Timbers U23s	11	(2)
2015–2018	San Jose Earthquakes	85	(5)
2017	→ Reno 1868 (loan)	2	(0)
2018	→ FC Cincinnati (loan)	7	(1)
2019–2020	FC Cincinnati	14	(1)
2020	Columbus Crew	8	(1)
2021	Sacramento Republic	13	(0)

International career^{‡}
2015–2016	United States U23	12	(2)
- * Club domestic league appearances and goals as of November 8, 2021 ‡ National team caps and goals as of January 30, 2018

Abdul-Fatai Alashe (born August 21, 1993) is an American professional soccer player.

== Career ==
=== College and amateur ===
Alashe spent all four years of his college career at Michigan State University where he made a total of 86 appearances for the Spartans and tallied eight goals and eight assists.

He also played in the Premier Development League for Reading United and Portland Timbers U23s.

=== Professional ===
On January 15, 2015, Alashe was drafted 4th overall in the 2015 MLS SuperDraft by the San Jose Earthquakes. He made his debut on March 7 in a 1–0 defeat to FC Dallas, and scored the first league goal in Avaya Stadium history two weeks later in a 2–1 win over the visiting Chicago Fire.

On July 30, 2018, Alashe signed a deal to join FC Cincinnati on loan from San Jose for the remainder of the 2018 season, then joining the team permanently for the 2019 season for $135,000 in allocation money.

On August 17, 2020, Alashe was traded to Ohio rivals Columbus Crew in exchange for a 2nd-round pick in the 2021 MLS SuperDraft, and potentially a conditional $50,000 of General Allocation Money depending on performance. Columbus declined their contract option on Alashe following their 2020 season.

On March 24, 2021, Alashe joined USL Championship club Sacramento Republic FC. Alashe was released by Sacramento following the 2021 season.

=== International ===
In January 2016 Alashe received his first call up to the senior United States squad for friendlies against Iceland and Canada but had to withdraw through injury.

== Personal life ==
Alashe is of Nigerian descent.

== Career statistics ==
As of October 27, 2018

Club	Season	League			Open Cup		MLS Cup		Total	
Club	Season	Division	Apps	Goals	Apps	Goals	Apps	Goals	Apps	Goals
San Jose Earthquakes	2015	Major League Soccer	28	2	1	0	-	-	29	2
San Jose Earthquakes	2016	Major League Soccer	28	3	1	0	-	-	29	3
San Jose Earthquakes	2017	Major League Soccer	17	0	1	0	0	0	18	0
San Jose Earthquakes	2018	Major League Soccer	12	0	0	0	-	-	12	0
FC Cincinnati	2019	Major League Soccer	11	1	2	1	0	0	13	2
FC Cincinnati	2020	Major League Soccer	3	0	-	-	0	0	3	0
Columbus Crew	2020	Major League Soccer	0	0	-	-	0	0	0	0
MLS Total			99	6	5	1	0	0	104	7
Reno 1868 FC (loan)	2017	USL Championship	2	0	0	0	-	-	2	0
FC Cincinnati (loan)	2018	USL Championship	7	1	0	0	2	0	9	1
Loan Total			9	1	0	0	2	0	11	1
Career Total			108	7	5	1	2	0	115	8

== Honors ==
Columbus Crew

- MLS Cup: 2020
