= Aníbal Godoy =

Panamanian footballer (born 1990)

- Godoy with San Diego FC in 2026

Personal information
- Full name: Aníbal Casis Godoy Lemus
- Date of birth: 10 February 1990 (age 36)
- Place of birth: Panama City, Panama
- Height: 1.83 m (6 ft 0 in)
- Position: Defensive midfielder

Team information
- Current team: San Diego FC
- Number: 20

Youth career
- Arsenal
- Chepo

Senior career*
Years	Team	Apps	(Gls)
2007–2013	Chepo	113	(10)
2012	→ Godoy Cruz (loan)	0	(0)
2013–2015	Honvéd	24	(0)
2015–2019	San Jose Earthquakes	101	(5)
2020–2024	Nashville SC	111	(3)
2025–	San Diego FC	55	(2)

International career
- Panama U17
2007–2008	Panama U20	14	(1)
2010	Panama U21	2	(1)
2010–2026	Panama	160	(4)
Medal record
Men's football
Representing Panama
CONCACAF Gold Cup
Runner-up	2023 Canada-United States	Team
Runner-up	2013 United States
Third place	2015 Canada-United States
CONCACAF Nations League
Runner-up	2025 United States	Team
- * Club domestic league appearances and goals as of 28 October 2026

Aníbal Casis Godoy Lemus (Spanish: [aˈniβal ɣoˈðoj]; born 10 February 1990) is a Panamanian professional footballer who plays as a defensive midfielder for Major League Soccer club San Diego FC.

== Club career ==
Godoy started his career at Chepo and moved abroad in November 2011 to join Godoy Cruz on loan to play alongside compatriot Armando Cooper after being voted Player of the Year in Panama. After returning to Chepo he moved to Europe in August 2013 when he signed for Hungarian side Honvéd Budapest. He made his debut for them on 1 September 2013 against Kaposvár Rákóczi.

=== San Jose Earthquakes ===
Godoy signed for MLS side San Jose Earthquakes on 6 August 2015. On 30 November 2017, he signed a new, multi-year contract with the club. He took on the role of vice-captain during the 2018 season.

=== Nashville SC ===
On 7 August 2019, it was announced that at the conclusion of the 2019 season, Godoy would move to Nashville SC ahead of their inaugural MLS season in 2020. San Jose would receive $650,000 of General Allocation Money in return. He was released by Nashville following their 2024 season.

=== San Diego FC ===
Godoy signed with MLS expansion club San Diego FC on 19 December 2024. The team announced Godoy had joined on a one-year contract with club options for the following two seasons.

== International career ==
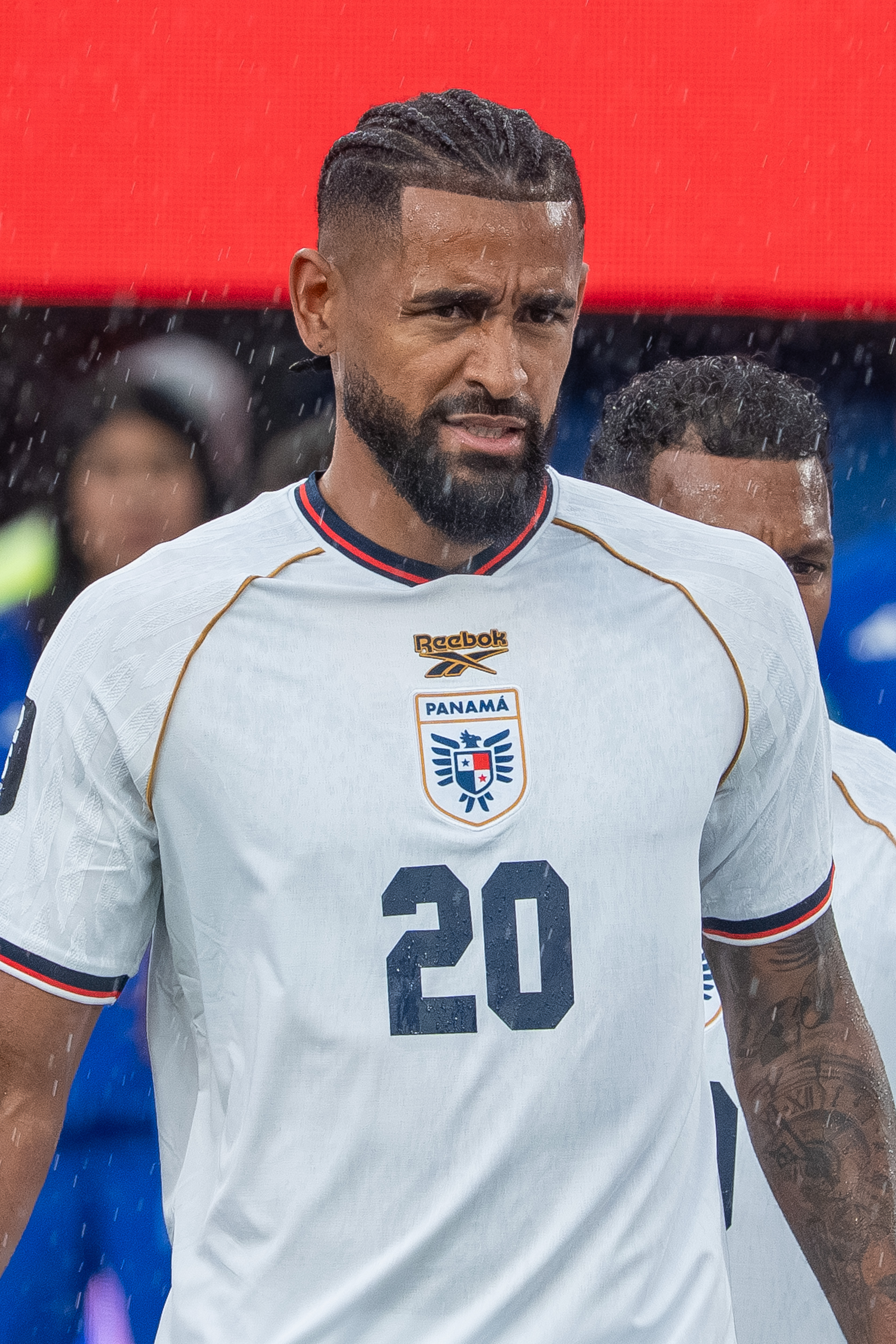
Godoy with Panama in 2026

With the Panama under-20 team, Godoy participated in the 2007 FIFA U-20 World Cup in Canada.

Godoy made his senior debut for Panama in a March 2010 friendly match against Venezuela, and went on to earn a record total of 160 caps, scoring four goals. He also played at the 2011 and 2013 Gold Cups.

Godoy represented Panama in all four of its 2017 Gold Cup matches, comprising three group stage matches and one quarter-final. He tallied one assist and was named to the Best XI of the group stages, but ultimately scored an own goal in Panama's quarter-final match against Costa Rica and club teammate Marco Ureña, resulting in the end of the tournament for Panama and Costa Rica's advancement to the semi-finals.

During the lead-up to the 2018 World Cup, Godoy was called up to the squad for friendlies against Denmark and Switzerland on 22 and 27 March, respectively, along with San Jose teammate Harold Cummings. In May 2018, he was named in Panama's 23-man squad for the 2018 World Cup in Russia. He captained his national team at the 2023 CONCACAF Gold Cup, helping them reach the final, where they were defeated 1–0 by Mexico. On 26 May 2026, he was named in the 26-man squad for the 2026 World Cup. He announced his international retirement following his team's group stage elimination at the World Cup.

== Personal life ==
As of 27 February 2018, Godoy holds a U.S. green card, qualifying him as a domestic player for MLS roster purposes.

Godoy became a naturalized American citizen on March 31, 2025.

== Career statistics ==
=== Club ===
As of match played 28 October 2026

Appearances and goals by club, season and competition
Club	Season	League			National cup (Note: Includes Magyar Kupa, U.S. Open Cup)		League cup (Note: Includes Ligakupa, MLS Cup playoffs)		Continental (Note: Includes Leagues Cup, CONCACAF Champions Cup)		Total	
Club	Season	Division	Apps	Goals	Apps	Goals	Apps	Goals	Apps	Goals	Apps	Goals
Chepo	2007	Liga Panameña de Fútbol	3	0	0	0	0	0	0	0	3	0
Chepo	2008	Liga Panameña de Fútbol	20	1	0	0	0	0	0	0	20	1
Chepo	2009	Liga Panameña de Fútbol	25	3	0	0	0	0	0	0	25	3
Chepo	2010	Liga Panameña de Fútbol	11	0	0	0	0	0	0	0	11	0
Chepo	2010–11	Liga Panameña de Fútbol	31	5	0	0	0	0	0	0	31	5
Chepo	2012–13	Liga Panameña de Fútbol	20	1	0	0	0	0	0	0	20	1
Chepo	2013–14	Liga Panameña de Fútbol	3	0	0	0	0	0	0	0	3	0
Chepo	Total		113	10	0	0	0	0	0	0	113	10
Godoy Cruz (loan)	2011–12	Argentine Primera División	0	0	0	0	0	0	0	0	0	0
Honvéd	2013–14	NB I	6	0	1	0	0	0	0	0	7	0
Honvéd	2014–15	NB I	18	0	1	0	4	0	0	0	23	0
Honvéd	Total		24	0	2	0	4	0	0	0	30	0
San Jose Earthquakes	2015	MLS	10	2	0	0	0	0	0	0	10	2
San Jose Earthquakes	2016	MLS	23	1	0	0	0	0	0	0	23	1
San Jose Earthquakes	2017	MLS	26	2	1	0	1	0	0	0	28	2
San Jose Earthquakes	2018	MLS	27	0	0	0	0	0	0	0	27	0
San Jose Earthquakes	2019	MLS	15	0	0	0	0	0	0	0	15	0
San Jose Earthquakes	Total		101	5	1	0	1	0	0	0	103	5
Nashville SC	2020	MLS	20	1	0	0	1	0	0	0	21	1
Nashville SC	2021	MLS	26	0	0	0	2	0	0	0	28	0
Nashville SC	2022	MLS	19	1	1	0	1	0	0	0	21	1
Nashville SC	2023	MLS	23	0	0	0	2	0	7	1	32	1
Nashville SC	2024	MLS	23	1	0	0	0	0	6	0	29	1
Nashville SC	Total		111	3	1	0	6	0	13	1	131	4
San Diego FC	2025	MLS	25	1	0	0	5	0	3	0	33	1
San Diego FC	2026	MLS	30	1	0	0	0	0	6	0	36	1
San Diego FC	Total		55	2	0	0	5	0	9	0	69	2
Career total			404	20	4	0	16	0	22	1	446	21

=== International ===
Appearances and goals by national team and year
National team	Year	Apps	Goals
Panama	2010	5	0
Panama	2011	11	0
Panama	2012	8	0
Panama	2013	19	0
Panama	2014	3	1
Panama	2015	16	0
Panama	2016	8	0
Panama	2017	15	0
Panama	2018	12	0
Panama	2019	3	0
Panama	2020	0	0
Panama	2021	13	2
Panama	2022	13	1
Panama	2023	10	0
Panama	2024	9	0
Panama	2025	12	0
Panama	2026	3	0
Total		160	4

Scores and results list Panama's goal tally first.

List of international goals scored by Aníbal Godoy
No.	Date	Venue	Opponent	Score	Result	Competition
1	14 November 2014	Estadio Cuscatlán, San Salvador, El Salvador	El Salvador	2–0	3–1	Friendly
2	8 June 2021	Estadio Nacional, Panama City, Panama	Dominican Republic	1–0	3–0	2022 FIFA World Cup qualification
3	10 October 2021	Estadio Rommel Fernández, Panama City, Panama	United States	1–0	1–0	2022 FIFA World Cup qualification
4	27 March 2022	Exploria Stadium, Orlando, United States	United States	1–5	1–5	2022 FIFA World Cup qualification

== Honours ==
Nashville SC

- Leagues Cup runner-up: 2023

Panama

- CONCACAF Gold Cup runner-up: 2013, 2023; third place: 2015
- CONCACAF Nations League runner-up: 2024–25

== See also ==
- List of men's footballers with 100 or more international caps
