= Matías Pérez García =

Argentine footballer

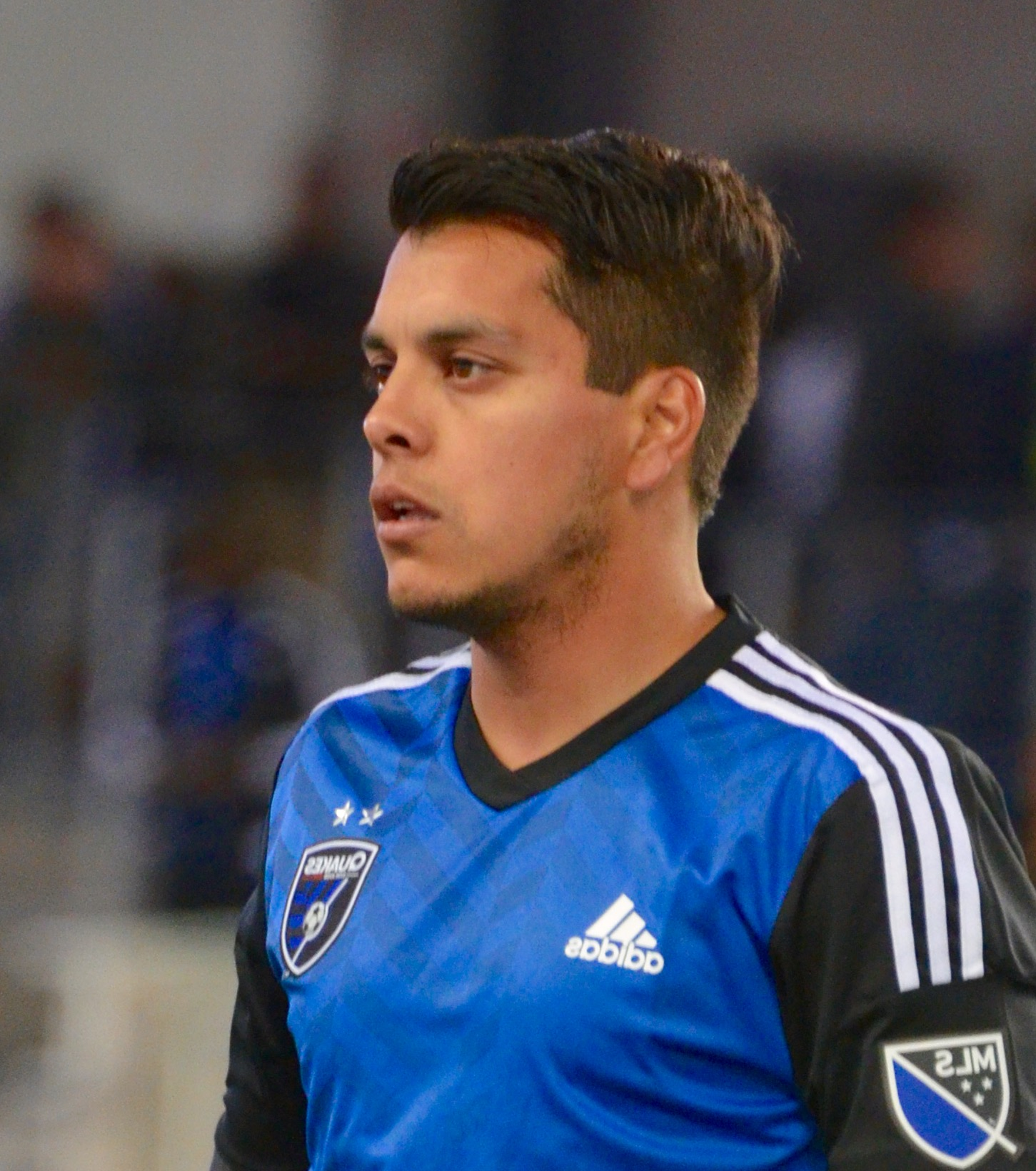
- Pérez García with the San Jose Earthquakes

Personal information
- Full name: Matías Augusto Pérez García
- Date of birth: 13 October 1984 (age 42)
- Place of birth: Tartagal, Argentina
- Height: 1.65 m (5 ft 5 in)
- Position: Attacking midfielder

Team information
- Current team: Sport Huancayo
- Number: 27

Youth career
- Lanús

Senior career*
Years	Team	Apps	(Gls)
2002–2006	Lanús	4	(0)
2005–2006	→ C.A.I. (loan)	15	(0)
2006–2007	Talleres de Remedios	39	(12)
2007–2009	Cerro	0	(0)
2007–2008	→ Atlanta (loan)	14	(3)
2008–2009	→ Chamois (loan)	44	(5)
2009–2010	All Boys	51	(5)
2011–2012	Universidad de Chile	9	(0)
2011–2012	→ All Boys (loan)	30	(1)
2012–2014	Tigre	63	(13)
2014–2016	San Jose Earthquakes	47	(3)
2016–2017	Orlando City	28	(1)
2017–2019	Tigre	33	(1)
2019	Cúcuta Deportivo	38	(3)
2020–2021	Gimnasia LP	33	(3)
2022–2023	Deportivo Municipal	64	(7)
2024	Sport Huancayo	21	(2)

International career
2000–2001	Argentina U17	8	(1)
2003–2004	Argentina U20	6	(1)
- * Club domestic league appearances and goals as of 14 September 2024

Matías Augusto Pérez García (born 13 October 1984) is an Argentine professional football midfielder who currently plays for Sport Huancayo in the Peruvian Primera División.

== Career ==
Pérez García began his playing career in 2002 with Lanús of the Argentine Primera División. He then played a number of seasons in the Argentine 2nd division with C.A.I. and Talleres de Remedios de Escalada. In 2007, he was signed by Uruguayan club C.A. Cerro and loaned out to Atlanta and then Chamois Niortais. In 2011, he signed for the Chilean club Universidad de Chile of the Chilean Primera División. After the 2011 Apertura he returned on loan to All Boys, after play only 7 games in the Tournament.

=== San Jose Earthquakes ===
Pérez García signed for Major League Soccer side San Jose Earthquakes on 31 July 2014. He debuted for San Jose on 8 August 2014 against LA Galaxy, where he scored his first goal of his MLS career.

=== Orlando City ===
Pérez García was traded to Orlando City on 3 August 2016, in exchange for midfielder Darwin Cerén. He was waived by Orlando on 28 June 2017.

=== Tigre ===
After being released by Orlando City in June 2017, Pérez García signed with Tigre on 18 July 2017.

=== In Peru ===
In 2022, Pérez García moved to Peru and joined Deportivo Municipal. In 2024, he switched to Sport Huancayo.

== Career statistics ==
As of match played 14 September 2024

Appearances and goals by club, season and competition
Club	Season	League			Cup		Continental		Other		Total	
Club	Season	Division	Apps	Goals	Apps	Goals	Apps	Goals	Apps	Goals	Apps	Goals
Lanús	2002–03	Argentine Primera División	1	0	—		—		—		1	0
Lanús	2003–04	Argentine Primera División	3	0	—		—		—		3	0
Lanús	Total		4	0	—		—		—		4	0
C.A.I. (loan)	2005–06	Primera B Nacional	14	0	—		—		—		14	0
Talleres de Remedios	2006–07	Primera B Nacional	39	12	—		—		—		39	12
Atlanta (loan)	2007–08	Primera B Nacional	14	3	—		—		—		14	3
Chamois (loan)	2007–08	Ligue 2	13	2	—		—		—		13	2
Chamois (loan)	2008–09	National	31	3	3	1	—		1	0	35	4
Chamois (loan)	Total		44	5	3	1	—		1	0	48	6
All Boys	2009–10	Primera B Nacional	34	3	—		—		2	0	36	3
All Boys	2010–11	Argentine Primera División	15	2	—		—		—		15	2
All Boys	Total		49	5	—		—		2	0	51	5
Universidad de Chile	2011	Primera División of Chile	9	0	—		—		—		9	0
All Boys (loan)	2011–12	Argentine Primera División	30	1	0	0	—		—		30	1
Tigre	2012–13	Argentine Primera División	33	5	0	0	15	4	—		48	9
Tigre	2013–14	Argentine Primera División	30	8	0	0	—		—		30	8
Tigre	Total		63	13	0	0	15	4	—		78	17
San Jose Earthquakes	2014	MLS	6	1	—		—		—		6	1
San Jose Earthquakes	2015	MLS	27	2	0	0	—		—		27	2
San Jose Earthquakes	2016	MLS	14	0	1	0	—		—		15	0
San Jose Earthquakes	Total		47	3	1	0	—		—		48	3
Orlando City	2016	MLS	13	0	—		—		—		13	0
Orlando City	2017	MLS	15	1	1	0	—		—		16	1
Orlando City	Total		28	1	1	0	—		—		29	1
Tigre	2017–18	Argentine Primera División	22	1	—		—		—		22	0
Tigre	2018–19	Argentine Primera División	11	0	1	0	—		—		12	1
Tigre	Total		33	1	1	0	—		—		34	1
Cúcuta Deportivo	2019	Categoría Primera A	38	3	0	0	—		—		38	3
Gimnasia LP	2019–20	Argentine Primera División	7	0	—		—		1	0	8	0
Gimnasia LP	2020–21	Argentine Primera División	6	0	1	0	—		—		7	0
Gimnasia LP	2021	Argentine Primera División	20	3	—		—		—		20	3
Gimnasia LP	Total		33	3	1	0	—		1	0	35	3
Deportivo Municipal	2022	Peruvian Primera División	34	2	—		—		—		34	2
Deportivo Municipal	2023	Peruvian Primera División	30	5	—		—		—		30	5
Deportivo Municipal	Total		64	7	—		—		—		64	7
Deportivo Municipal	2024	Peruvian Primera División	21	2	—		1	0	—		22	2
Career total			530	59	7	1	16	4	4	0	557	64

== Honours ==
Universidad de Chile

- Primera División de Chile: 2011 Apertura
