= Shea Salinas =

American soccer player (born 1986)

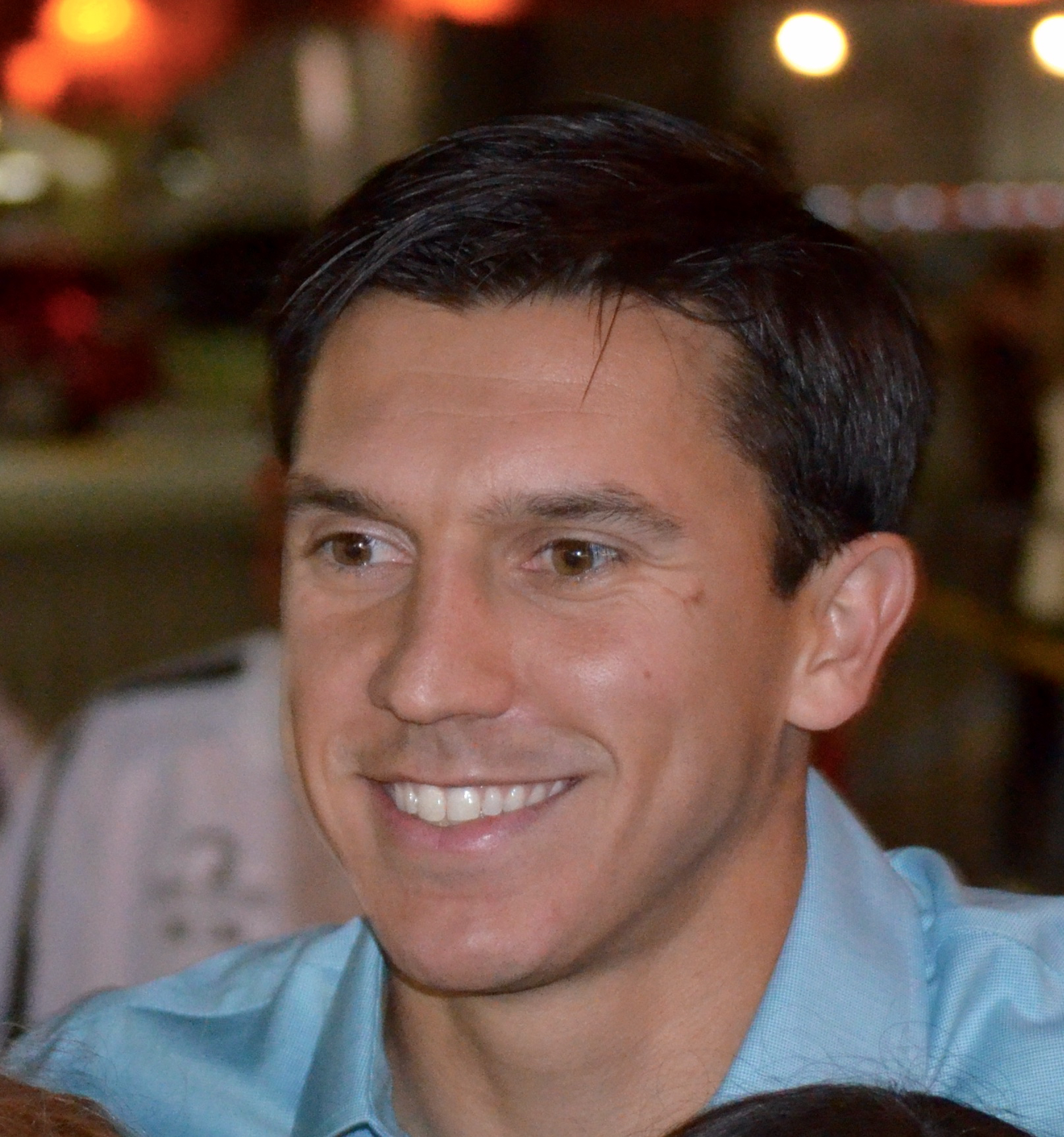
- Salinas in 2015

Personal information
- Full name: Robert O'Shea Salinas
- Date of birth: June 24, 1986 (age 40)
- Place of birth: Lubbock, Texas, United States
- Height: 5 ft 10 in (1.78 m)
- Positions: Winger; left-back

College career
| Years | Team | Apps | (Gls) |
| 2004–2007 | Furman Paladins | | |

Senior career*
| Years | Team | Apps | (Gls) |
| 2005–2006 | DFW Tornados | 14 | (3) |
| 2007 | Carolina Dynamo | 13 | (7) |
| 2008–2009 | San Jose Earthquakes | 23 | (2) |
| 2008 | → Charleston Battery (loan) | 1 | (0) |
| 2010 | Philadelphia Union | 17 | (1) |
| 2010 | → Harrisburg City Islanders (loan) | 1 | (0) |
| 2011 | Vancouver Whitecaps FC | 26 | (1) |
| 2012–2022 | San Jose Earthquakes | 286 | (18) |
| 2022 | San Jose Earthquakes II | 2 | (0) |
| Total | | 383 | (32) |
- * Club domestic league appearances and goals

Robert O'Shea "Shea" Salinas (born June 24, 1986) is an American former professional soccer player who played as a winger.

== Career ==
=== Youth and college ===
After attending Grapevine High School in Grapevine, Texas, Salinas played college soccer at Furman University, where he was named to the NSCAA All-America Third Team and the NSCAA All-South Region First Team in 2007, and the NSCAA All-South Region Third Team in 2006, as well as receiving First Team All Southern Conference honors in both 2007 and 2006. During his days at Furman University, Salinas was a brother in the Tau Kappa Epsilon fraternity. During his college years, Salinas played with both the DFW Tornados and Carolina Dynamo in the USL Premier Development League.

=== Professional ===
Salinas was drafted 15th overall by the expansion San Jose Earthquakes in the 2008 MLS SuperDraft. He made his MLS debut in the Quakes' season opener against Los Angeles Galaxy on April 3, 2008. He scored his first Quakes goal during a 3–2 loss against Kansas City Wizards on October 18, 2008. He also spent part of the 2008 season on loan with Charleston Battery in the USL First Division. He also holds the career assist record for the San Jose Earthquakes.

Salinas was selected by Philadelphia Union in the 2009 MLS Expansion Draft on November 25, 2009.

On November 24, 2010, Salinas was selected by Vancouver Whitecaps FC in the 2010 MLS Expansion Draft. Salinas scored his first goal in a Whitecaps jersey on August 27, in a game against the Houston Dynamo.

On November 30, 2011, Salinas was sent from the Vancouver Whitecaps to the San Jose Earthquakes in exchange for allocation money. On September 28, 2022, he announced his retirement as an active player after the conclusion of the 2022 season.

== Personal life ==
Born in the United States, Salinas is of Mexican descent.

== Career statistics ==
Appearances and goals by club, season and competition
| Club | Season | League | | | Cup (Note: Includes Canadian Championship and U.S. Open Cup) | | Continental | | Other | | Total | |
| Club | Season | Division | Apps | Goals | Apps | Goals | Apps | Goals | Apps | Goals | Apps | Goals |
|---|---|---|---|---|---|---|---|---|---|---|---|---|
| San Jose Earthquakes | 2008 | MLS | 23 | 2 | — | | — | | — | | 23 | 2 |
| Philadelphia Union | 2010 | MLS | 17 | 1 | — | | — | | — | | 17 | 1 |
| Vancouver Whitecaps FC | 2011 | MLS | 26 | 1 | 4 | 0 | — | | — | | 30 | 1 |
| San Jose Earthquakes | 2012 | MLS | 19 | 1 | 1 | 0 | — | | 2 (Note: Appearance(s) in MLS Cup Playoffs) | 0 | 22 | 1 |
| San Jose Earthquakes | 2013 | MLS | 28 | 2 | 1 | 0 | — | | — | | 29 | 2 |
| San Jose Earthquakes | 2014 | MLS | 31 | 1 | — | | 4 (Note: Appearance(s) in CONCACAF Champions League) | 1 | — | | 35 | 2 |
| San Jose Earthquakes | 2015 | MLS | 34 | 3 | — | | — | | — | | 34 | 3 |
| San Jose Earthquakes | 2016 | MLS | 33 | 1 | 1 | 0 | — | | — | | 34 | 1 |
| San Jose Earthquakes | 2017 | MLS | 25 | 1 | 4 | 1 | — | | 1 | 0 | 30 | 2 |
| San Jose Earthquakes | 2018 | MLS | 25 | 0 | — | | — | | — | | 25 | 0 |
| San Jose Earthquakes | 2019 | MLS | 28 | 6 | — | | — | | — | | 28 | 6 |
| San Jose Earthquakes | 2020 | MLS | 23 | 2 | — | | — | | 1 | 1 | 24 | 3 |
| San Jose Earthquakes | 2021 | MLS | 27 | 0 | — | | — | | — | | 27 | 0 |
| San Jose Earthquakes | 2022 | MLS | 13 | 1 | 2 | 0 | — | | — | | 15 | 1 |
| San Jose Earthquakes | Total | | 286 | 18 | 9 | 1 | 4 | 1 | 4 | 1 | 303 | 21 |
| San Jose Earthquakes II | 2022 | MLS Next Pro | 2 | 0 | — | | — | | — | | 2 | 0 |
| Career totals | | | 354 | 22 | 13 | 1 | 4 | 1 | 4 | 1 | 375 | 25 |

== Gallery ==
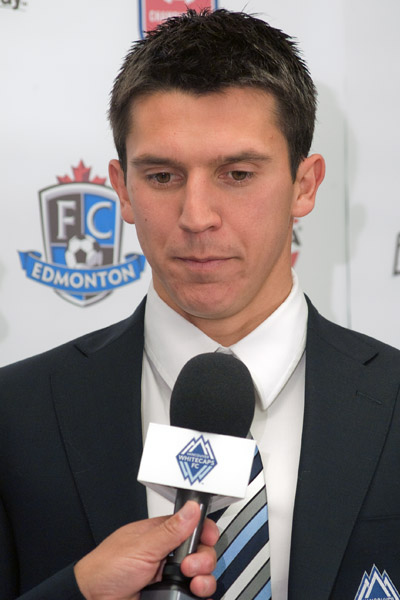
Interview from Vancouver era

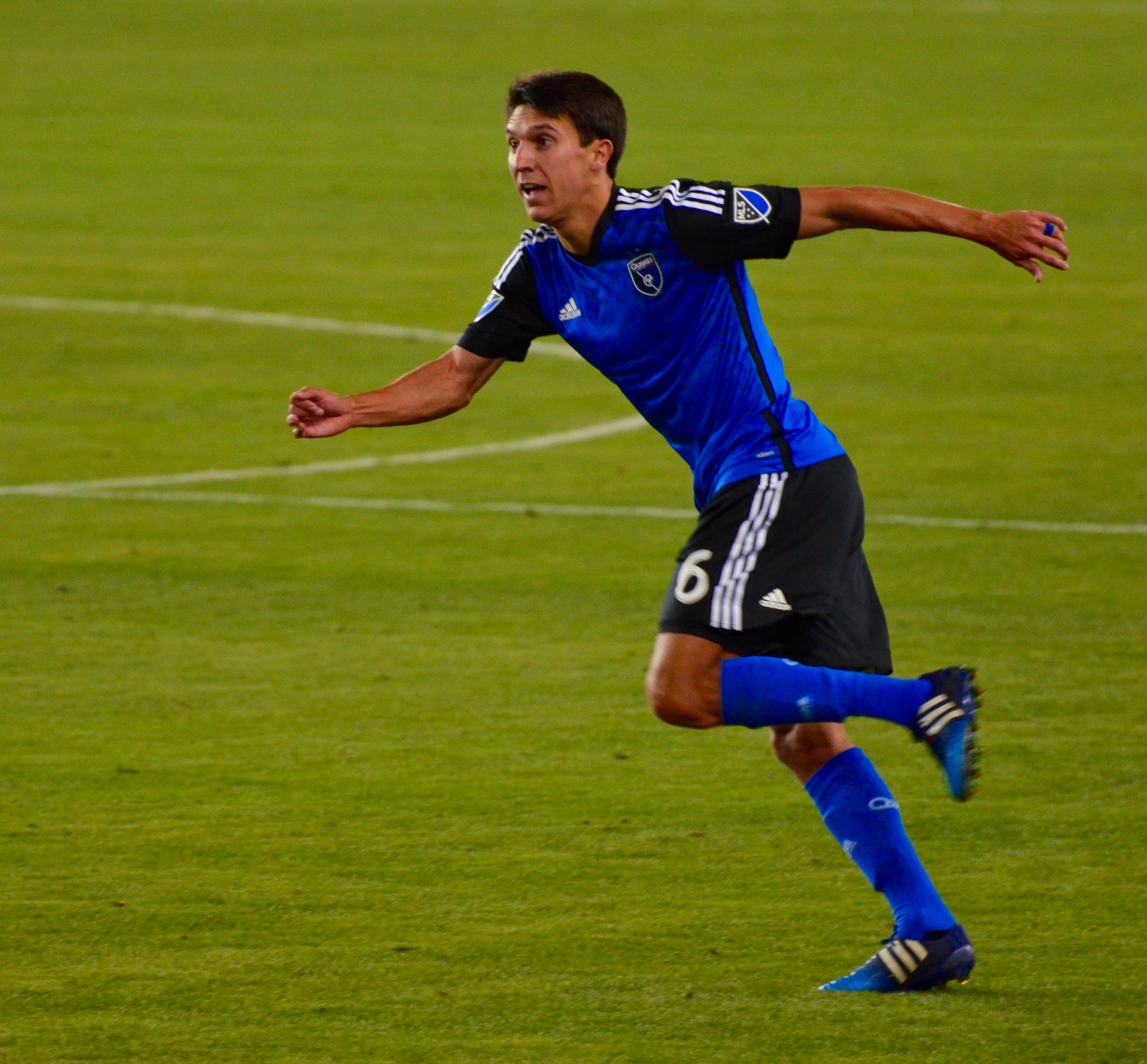
Playing at Avaya Stadium

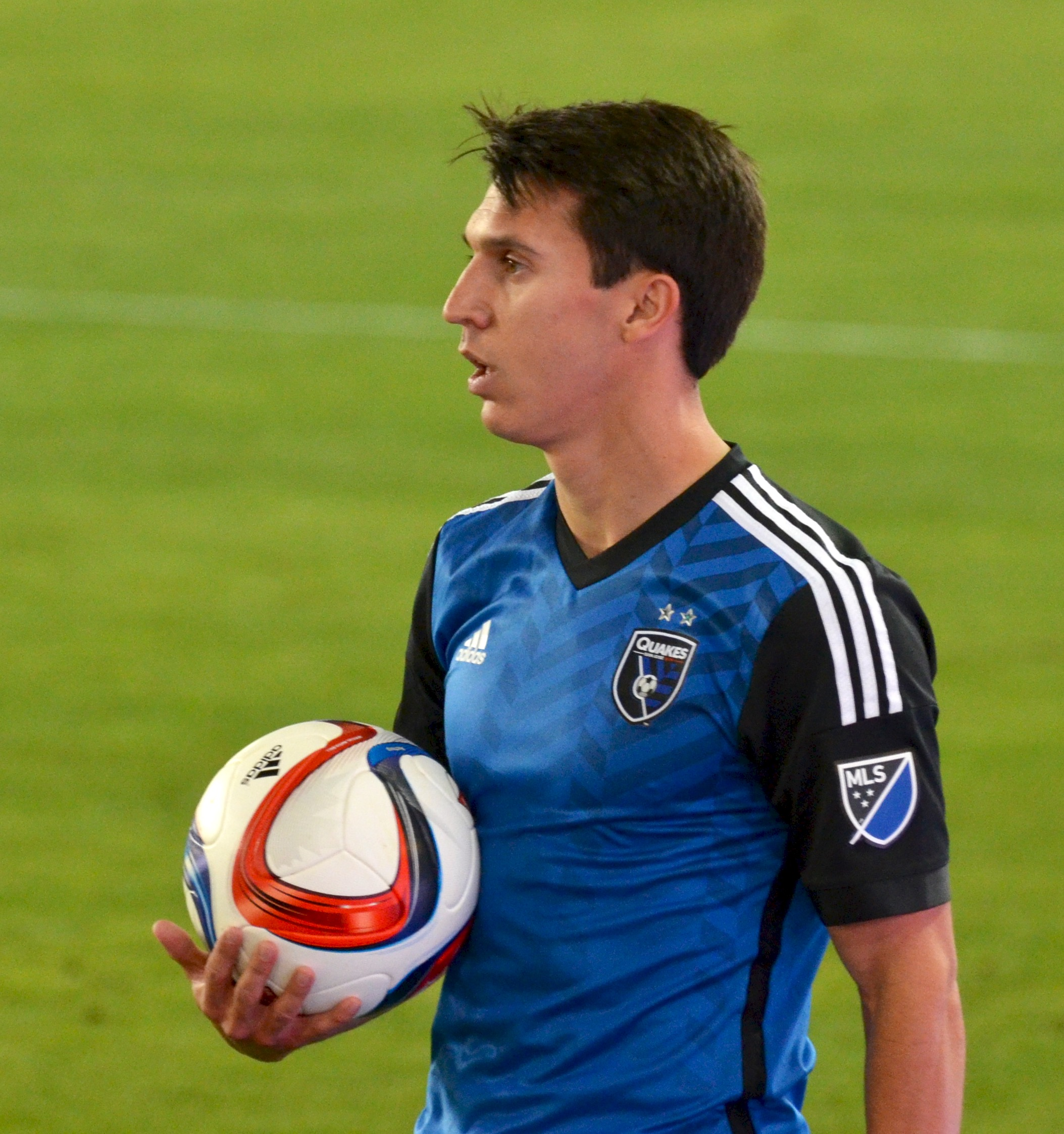
Ready for a throw-in
