= Mark Sherrod =

American soccer player (born 1990)

Personal information
- Date of birth: August 13, 1990 (age 36)
- Place of birth: Knoxville, Tennessee, U.S.
- Height: 1.90 m (6 ft 3 in)
- Position: Forward

Youth career
- 2009–2013: Memphis Tigers

Senior career*
Years	Team	Apps	(Gls)
2011	Chattanooga FC	12	(3)
2012–2013	Portland Timbers U23s	24	(11)
2014	Houston Dynamo	9	(2)
2015–2016	San Jose Earthquakes	6	(0)
2015	→ Sacramento Republic (loan)	5	(1)
2016	→ Sacramento Republic (loan)	2	(0)
- * Club domestic league appearances and goals as of October 29, 2016

Mark Sherrod (born August 13, 1990) is an American former professional soccer player who played as a forward in Major League Soccer.

== Career ==
=== Early career ===
Born in Knoxville, Tennessee, Sherrod played high-school soccer at Carter High School where he scored 172 goals during his time there with 63 goals coming his final season at the school. It was during that final season that Sherrod also won the Tennessee Gatorade Player of the Year award. He then went on to attend the University of Memphis where he played college soccer for the Memphis Tigers. During the summers, Mark spent 2011 playing with Chattanooga FC and 2012 and 2013 with Portland Timbers U23s.

=== Professional ===
On January 16, 2014, it was announced that Sherrod had been drafted by the Houston Dynamo of Major League Soccer in the second-round of the 2014 MLS SuperDraft. He then made his professional debut for the Dynamo on March 8, 2014, against the New England Revolution. He came on in the 90th minute for Will Bruin as the Dynamo won 4–0.

On May 11, 2014, Sherrod make his first career start and scored his first MLS goals, scoring twice against Real Salt Lake. Sherrod went on to start the next three games for the Dynamo before having his promising rookie season come to a close with a torn ACL on May 21, 2014.

At the conclusion of the 2014 MLS season, Sherrod was left unprotected by Houston for the 2014 MLS Expansion Draft and he was selected by Orlando City SC. The following day Sherrod was traded to San Jose Earthquakes for a second-round pick in the 2015 MLS SuperDraft.

Sherrod started two games with the San Jose Earthquakes in 2015, and did not appear in any games with the team in 2016 after suffering another left knee injury.

Mark retired at the age of 26 before the 2017 season due to recurring knee injuries. Upon retiring from his professional soccer career, Mark entered the world of tech SaaS sales.

== Career statistics ==
As of July 7, 2014

Club	Season	League			MLS Cup		U.S. Open Cup		CONCACAF		Total	
Club	Season	Division	Apps	Goals	Apps	Goals	Apps	Goals	Apps	Goals	Apps	Goals
Memphis Tigers	2010	NCAA D-1	17	4	—	—	0	0	0	0	17	4
Memphis Tigers	2011	NCAA D-1	18	19	—	—	0	0	0	0	18	19
Memphis Tigers	2012	NCAA D-1	18	12	—	—	0	0	0	0	18	12
Portland Timbers U23s	2012	PDL	16	10	—	—	0	0	0	0	16	10
Memphis Tigers	2013	NCAA D-1	18	7	—	—	0	0	0	0	18	17
Portland Timbers U23s	2013	PDL	8	1	—	—	0	0	0	0	8	1
Houston Dynamo	2014	MLS	9	2	—	—	0	0	0	0	9	2
San Jose Earthquakes	2015	MLS	6	0	—	—	2	0	0	0	8	0
Career total			104	55	0	0	0	0	0	0	104	55
