= Quincy Amarikwa =

American soccer player (born 1987)

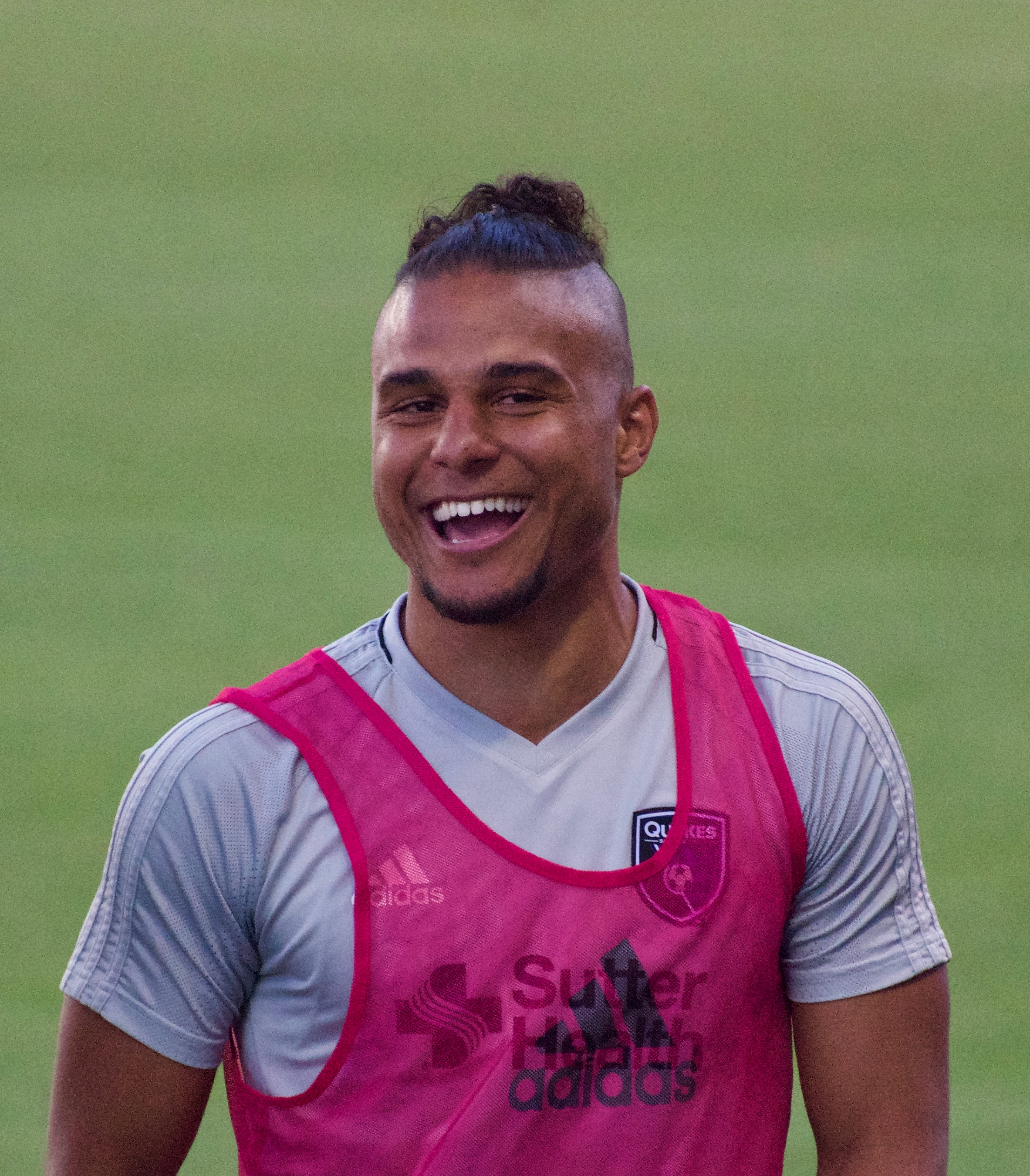
- Warming up for San Jose in 2017

Personal information
- Full name: Quincy Obinna Amarikwa
- Date of birth: October 29, 1987 (age 38)
- Place of birth: Bakersfield, California, United States
- Height: 5 ft 9 in (1.75 m)
- Positions: Forward; winger

College career
Years	Team	Apps	(Gls)
2006–2008	UC Davis Aggies	75	(31)

Senior career*
Years	Team	Apps	(Gls)
2008	Bakersfield Brigade	7	(4)
2009–2010	San Jose Earthquakes	25	(1)
2010–2012	Colorado Rapids	31	(3)
2012	Toronto FC	11	(0)
2013–2015	Chicago Fire	60	(11)
2015–2018	San Jose Earthquakes	63	(9)
2018–2019	Montreal Impact	10	(1)
2019	D.C. United	23	(1)
2020	Las Vegas Lights	6	(0)
2021	Oakland Roots	14	(2)
Total		250	(32)
- * Club domestic league appearances and goals as of November 8, 2021

Quincy Obinna Amarikwa (/ɑːˈmɑːriːkwɑː/ ah-MAR-eek-wah; born October 29, 1987) is an American former professional soccer player.

== Career ==
=== Early career ===
Amarikwa attended Liberty High School. He was a member of the Bakersfield Alliance club soccer team and played college soccer at UC Davis. In 2008, he led the team to the second round of the NCAA Tournament for the first time in school history.

During his college years, Amarikwa also played with Bakersfield Brigade in the USL Premier Development League.

=== Professional ===
Amarikwa was drafted in the third round of the 2009 MLS SuperDraft by San Jose Earthquakes. He made his professional debut in San Jose's first game of the 2009 MLS season against the New England Revolution and scored his first MLS goal on October 7 against FC Dallas.

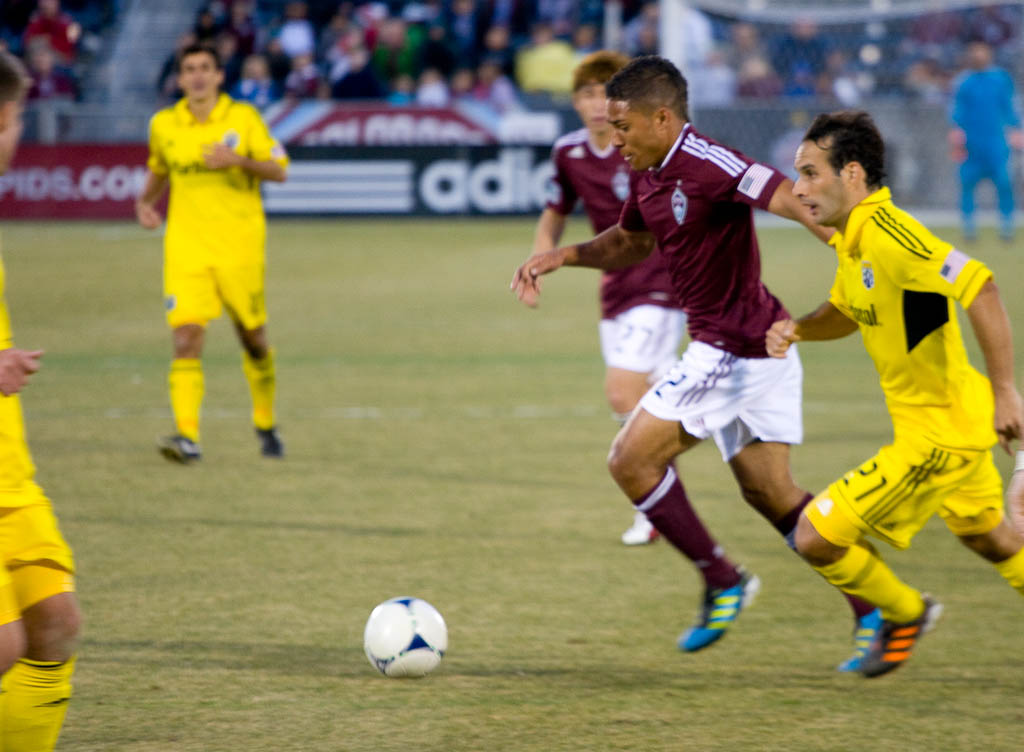
Amarikwa playing for the Colorado Rapids

After 25 games for San Jose and one goal, he was traded to Colorado Rapids in April 2010 in exchange for a second-round selection in the 2012 MLS SuperDraft. Amarikwa made 31 league appearances for Colorado scoring three goals and was a member of the side that captured the 2010 MLS Cup.

Amarikwa was waived by Colorado in June 2012. Shortly thereafter his rights were claimed through waivers by the New York Red Bulls. He spent two weeks training with New York but never signed, instead, New York traded Amarikwa to Toronto FC for a conditional draft pick on July 21. He made his league debut for Toronto in a 2–0 home defeat to Houston Dynamo on July 28. Amarikwa scored his first goal for Toronto in CONCACAF Champions League play against Santos Laguna in a 3–1 home defeat.

In February 2013, Amarikwa was acquired by Chicago Fire in exchange for a first-round selection in the 2014 MLS Supplemental Draft.

In June 2015, Chicago Fire traded Amarikwa to San Jose Earthquakes in exchange for defender Ty Harden. He scored two goals in four minutes in his second Earthquakes appearance during the California Clásico against the LA Galaxy. Amarikwa was sidelined for the rest of the 2016 season and for the first half of the 2017 season after suffering a knee injury on September 24, 2016, against Sporting Kansas City. He made his return to the team on July 14, 2017, in a friendly match against Eintracht Frankfurt, scoring a penalty kick twelve minutes after substituting in for Simon Dawkins and securing San Jose's 4–1 victory. On October 14, 2017, he was nominated for the MLS Comeback Player of the Year Award.

On August 8, 2018, Amarikwa was traded by the Earthquakes to Montreal Impact in exchange for Dominic Oduro. He made his debut for Montreal on August 11, 2018, in a game against Real Salt Lake.

On March 1, 2019, after speculation and Amarikwa appearing at D.C. United practices, Quincy Amarikwa signed with D.C. United. Amarikwa scored his first goal for D.C. United in a friendly against Real Betis on May 22, 2019. Amarikwa then scored his first D.C. United MLS goal against the New England Revolution on July 12, 2019. His goal equalized the game 2-2. His contract with D.C. United ran out after the 2019 season.

On September 1, 2020, Amarikwa signed with USL Championship side Las Vegas Lights.

On August 11, 2021, Amarikwa joined Oakland Roots SC.

== Personal life ==
Amarikwa is a member of the UC Davis Hall of Fame. While studying there, Quincy Amarikwa met his wife Sirena Amarikwa; they were engaged in 2016 while Sirena was pursuing her professional track career, and wed in January 2017. They have two sons, Sir Amarikwa and Lord Amarikwa.

Amarikwa and Ross LaBauex co-own a brand called Perfect Soccer, a Black news source for soccer. He is also Founder and Director of Strategic Partnerships for Black Players for Change, serving as interim director when the organisation was launched.

== Honors ==
Colorado Rapids

- Major League Soccer MLS Cup (1): 2010

== Statistics ==
Statistics accurate as of April 14, 2018.

Club	Season	League		Open Cup		MLS Cup		Other		Total	
Club	Season	Apps	Goals	Apps	Goals	Apps	Goals	Apps	Goals	Apps	Goals
San Jose Earthquakes	2009	24	1	0	0	0	0	-	-	24	1
San Jose Earthquakes	2010	7	0	0	0	0	0	-	-	7	0
San Jose Earthquakes	2015	17	6	0	0	0	0	2 (Note: Appearances in the International Champions Cup)	0	17	6
San Jose Earthquakes	2016	23	3	0	0	0	0	-	-	23	3
San Jose Earthquakes	2017	10	0	0	0	0	0	-	-	10	0
San Jose Earthquakes	2018	4	0	0	0	0	0	-	-	4	0
Total		85	10	0	0	0	0	2	0	85	10
Colorado Rapids	2010	11	1	0	0	3	0	-	-	14	1
Colorado Rapids	2011	15	1	0	0	1	0	4 (Note: Appearances in the CONCACAF Champions League)	1	20	2
Colorado Rapids	2012	3	1	0	0	0	0	-	-	3	1
Total		29	3	0	0	4	0	4	1	37	4
Toronto FC	2012	11	0	0	0	0	0	3	2	14	2
Total		11	0	0	0	0	0	3	2	14	2
Chicago Fire SC	2013	14	3	1	0	0	0	-	-	15	3
Chicago Fire SC	2014	32	8	4	2	0	0	-	-	36	10
Chicago Fire SC	2015	14	0	1	1	0	0	-	-	15	1
Total		60	11	6	3	0	0	-	-	66	14
Career Total		185	24	6	3	4	0	9	3	204	30
