= Sports in California =

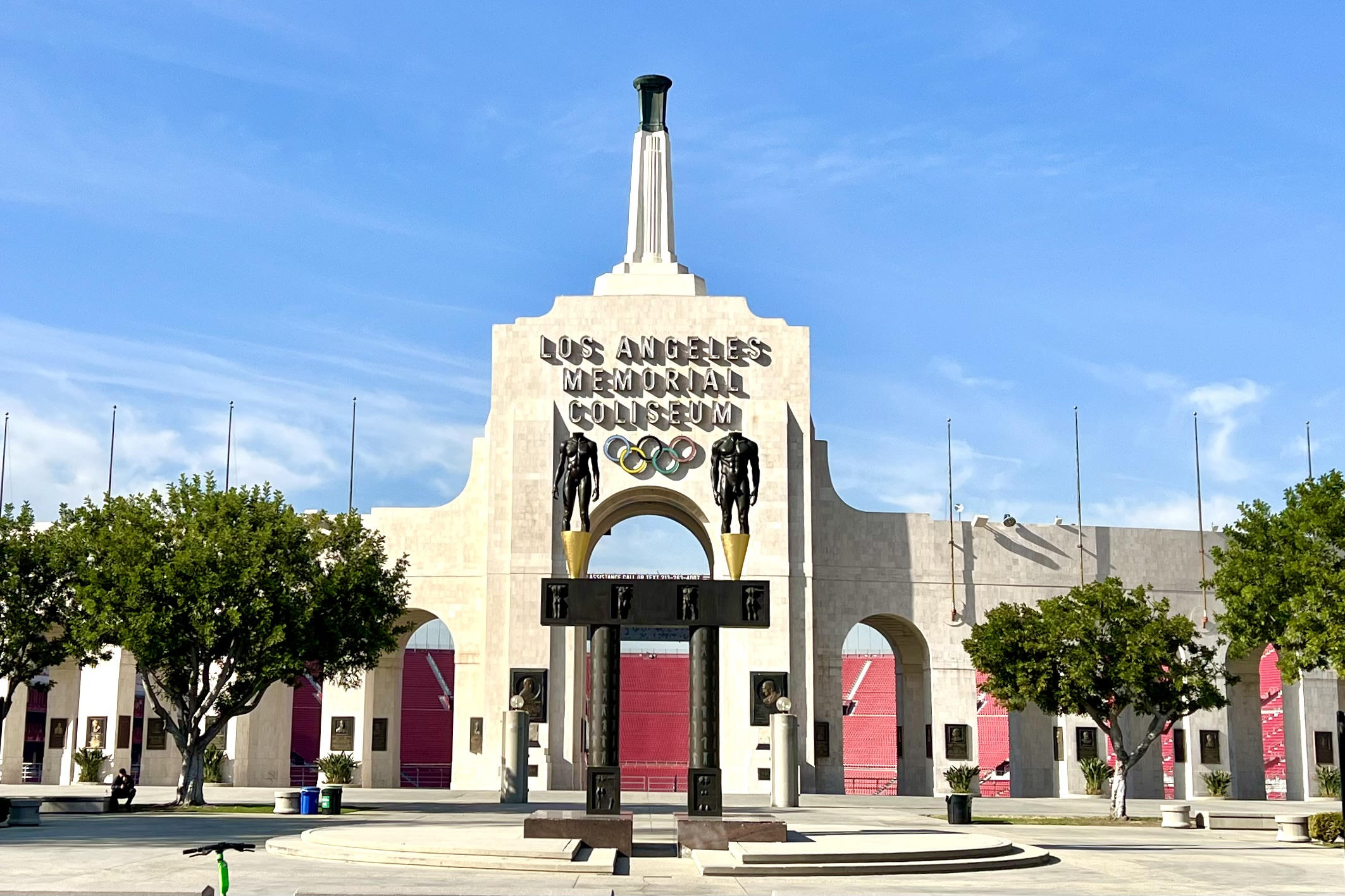
Los Angeles Memorial Coliseum, host of the 1932 Summer Olympics and 1984 Summer Olympics, and future host of the 2028 Summer Olympics.

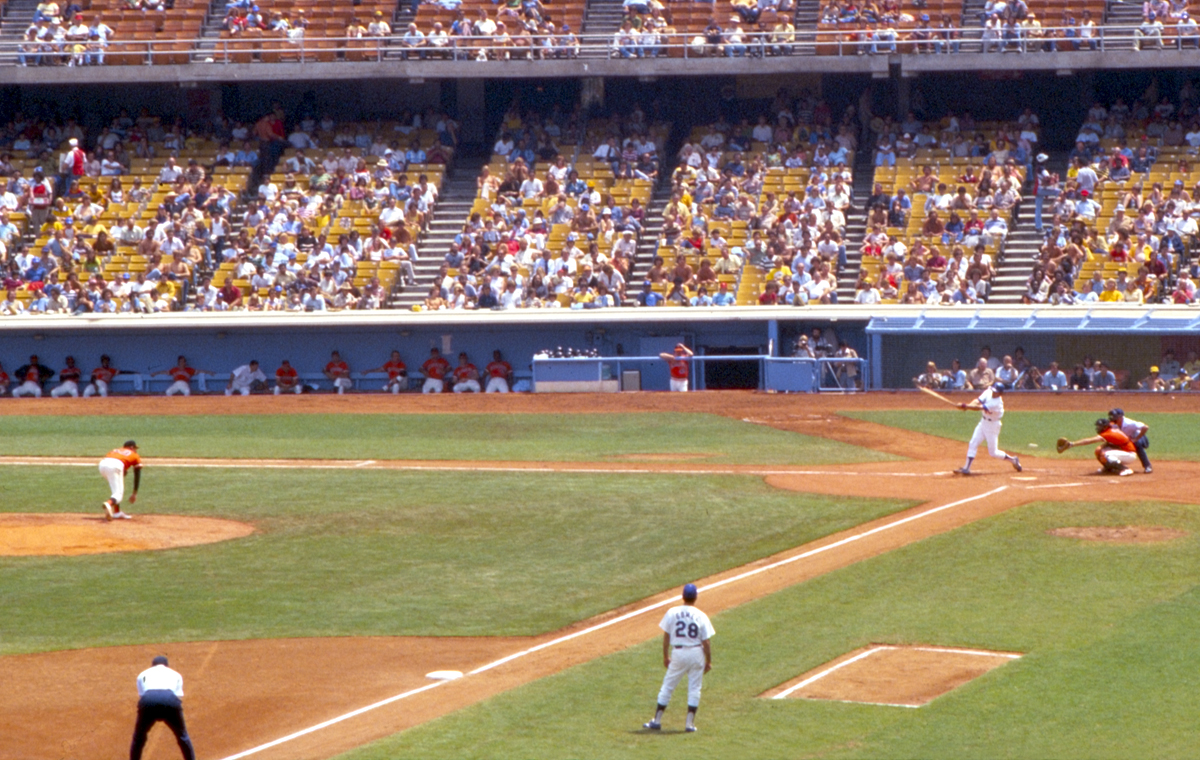
The San Francisco Giants playing the Los Angeles Dodgers at Dodger Stadium in August 1977

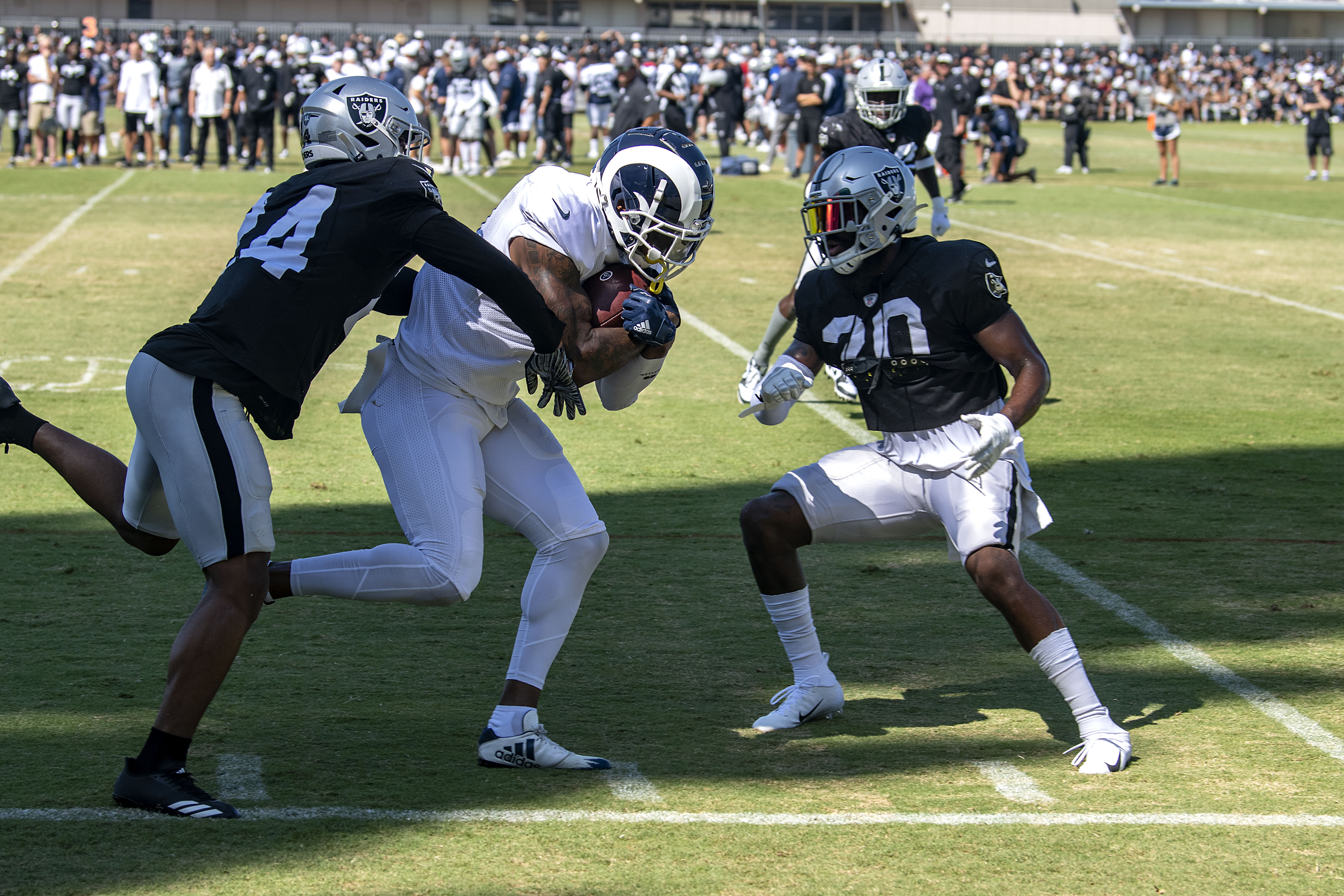
Oakland Raiders defensive backs pursuing a Los Angeles Rams receiver in a joint practice during the 2019 NFL training camp.

California has 19 franchises from the major professional sports leagues (MLB, NBA, NFL, NHL, and MLS), far more than any other US state. The Greater Los Angeles area has ten major league teams, the San Francisco Bay Area has five, and San Diego and Sacramento each have two.

California is home to some of most successful collegiate sports teams in the country. Among the list of NCAA schools with the most NCAA Division I championships the Stanford Cardinal, UCLA Bruins, USC Trojans and California Golden Bears rank #1, #2, #3 and #10 on the list by teams with the most titles, and #1, #4, #2, and #7 by most individual titles, respectively.

It is the only U.S. state to have hosted both the Summer and Winter Olympics. Los Angeles hosted the 1932 and 1984 summer games, and will host the 2028 Summer Olympics. The 1960 Winter Olympics were held at Squaw Valley Ski Resort in the Lake Tahoe region.

== Major league professional teams ==
=== Current teams ===
- Major League Baseball (MLB)
  - Athletics (since 2025) – based in West Sacramento; set to move out of state to Las Vegas in 2028 or 2029
  - Los Angeles Angels (since 1961) – based in Anaheim
  - Los Angeles Dodgers (since 1958)
  - San Diego Padres (since 1969)
  - San Francisco Giants (since 1958)
- National Basketball Association (NBA)
  - Golden State Warriors (since 1962) – based in San Francisco
  - Los Angeles Clippers (since 1984) – based in Inglewood
  - Los Angeles Lakers (since 1960)
  - Sacramento Kings (since 1985)
- National Football League (NFL)
  - Los Angeles Chargers (1960; since 2017) – plays in Inglewood; headquarters in El Segundo
  - Los Angeles Rams (1946–1994; since 2016) – plays in Inglewood; headquarters in Agoura Hills
  - San Francisco 49ers (since 1946) – plays in Santa Clara; headquarters also in Santa Clara
- National Hockey League (NHL)
  - Anaheim Ducks (since 1993)
  - Los Angeles Kings (since 1967)
  - San Jose Sharks (since 1991)
- Major League Soccer (MLS)
  - LA Galaxy (since 1996) – based in Carson
  - Los Angeles FC (since 2018)
  - San Diego FC (since 2025)
  - San Jose Earthquakes (since 1996)
- Women's National Basketball Association (WNBA)
  - Golden State Valkyries (since 2024) – based in San Francisco
  - Los Angeles Sparks (since 1997)
- National Women's Soccer League (NWSL)
  - Angel City FC (since 2022) – based in Los Angeles
  - Bay FC (since 2024) – based in San Jose
  - San Diego Wave FC (since 2022)
- Professional Women's Hockey League (PWHL)
  - San Jose Sea Lions (since 2026) - based in San Jose

=== Former teams ===
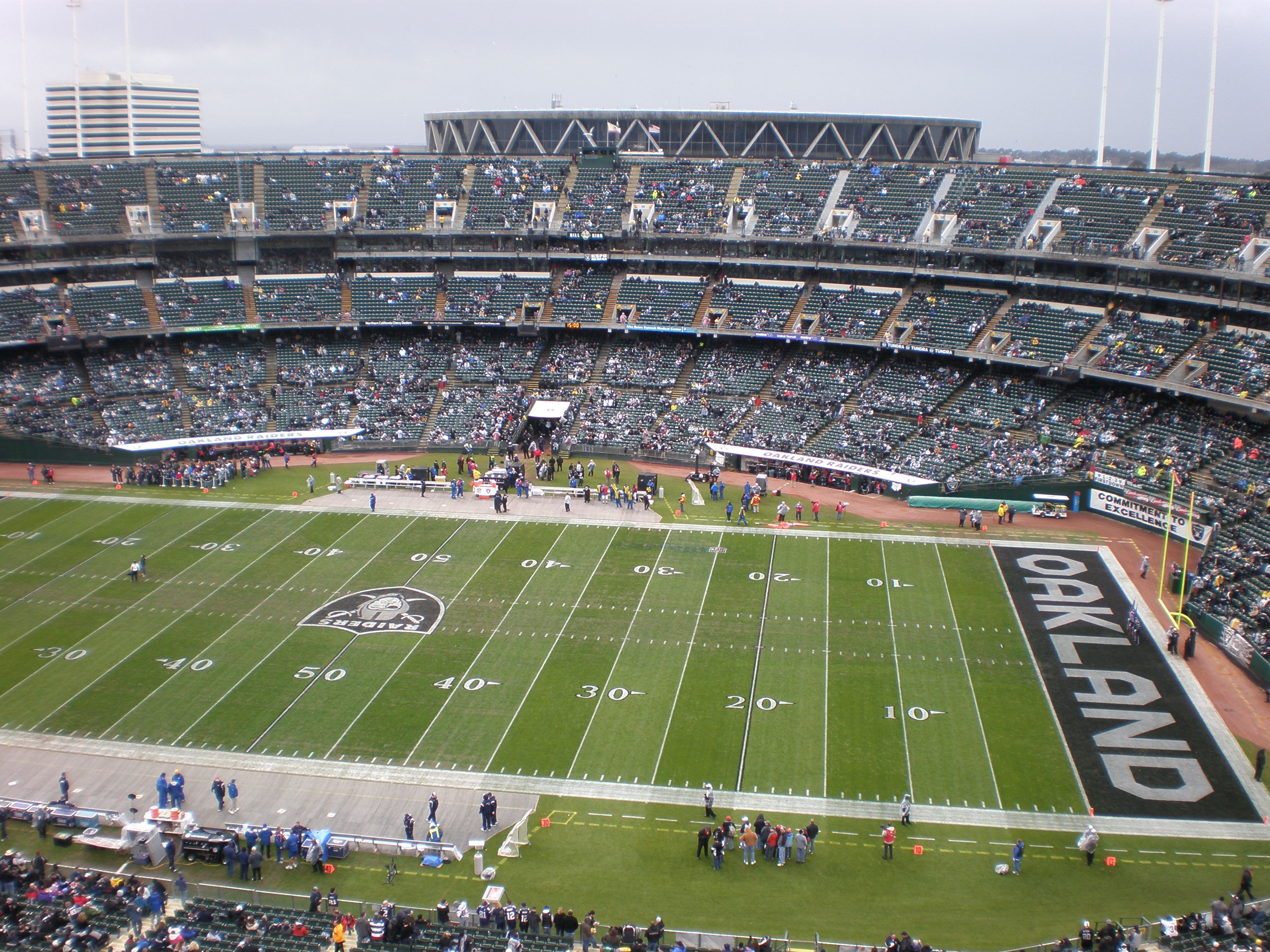
The NFL's Raiders and MLB's Athletics formerly played at the multi-purpose Oakland-Alameda County Coliseum (pictured in 2008) in Oakland, California

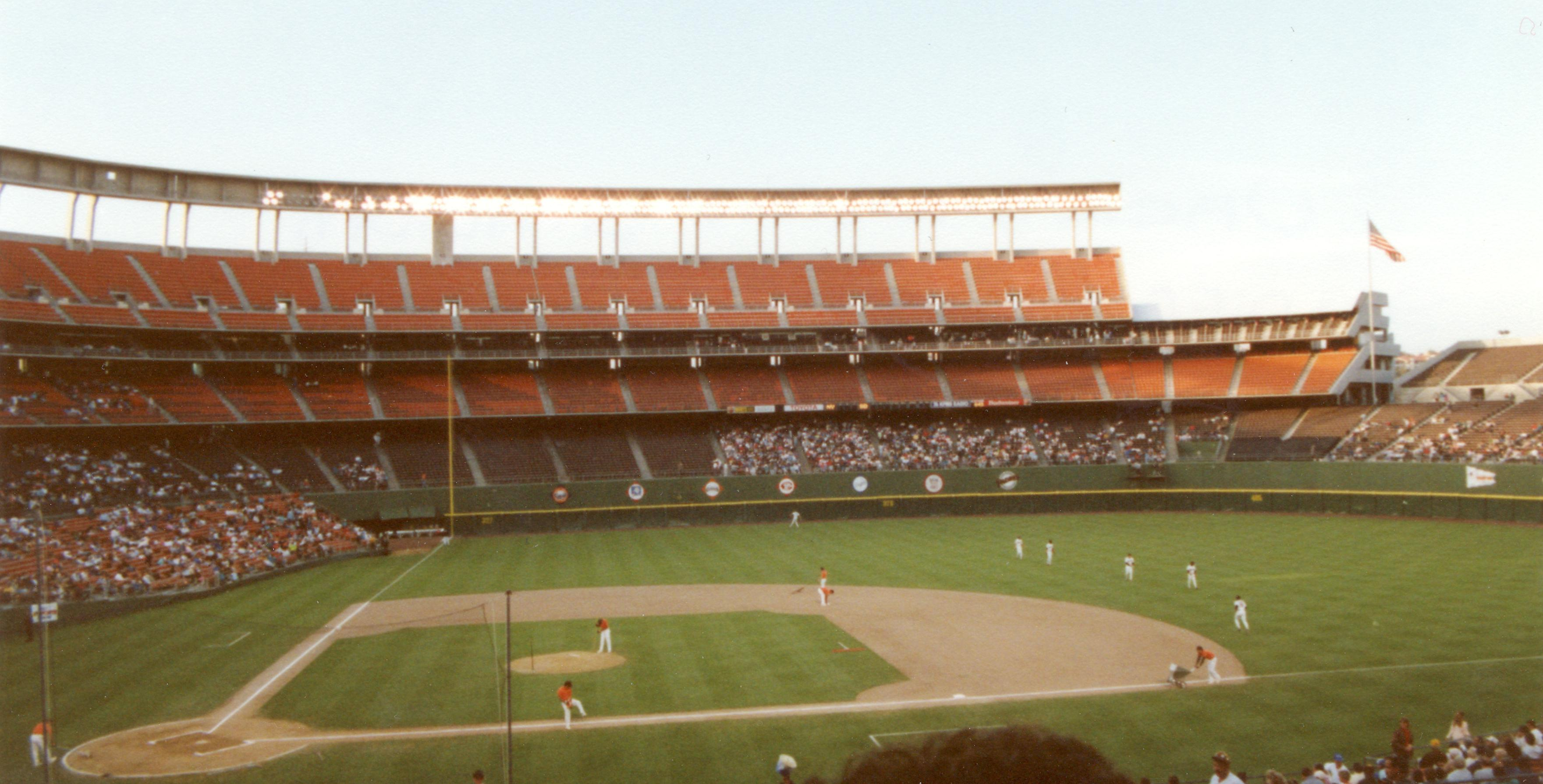
The NFL's Chargers and MLB's Padres formerly played at San Diego Stadium (pictured in 1990) in San Diego, California. The Padres moved to Petco Park in 2004.

- Major League Baseball (MLB)
  - Oakland Athletics (1968–2024)
- National Basketball Association (NBA)
  - San Diego Rockets (1967–1971)
  - San Diego Clippers (1978–1984)
- National Football League (NFL)
  - Oakland Raiders (1960–1981; 1995–2019)
  - Los Angeles Raiders (1982–1994)
  - San Diego Chargers (1961–2016)
- National Hockey League (NHL)
  - California Golden Seals (1967–1976)
- Major League Soccer (MLS)
  - Chivas USA (2005–2014)
- American Basketball Association (ABA)
  - Oakland Oaks (1967–1969)
  - Anaheim Amigos / Los Angeles Stars (1967–1970)
  - San Diego Conquistadors (1972–1975)
- North American Soccer League (NASL)
  - Oakland Clippers (1967–1968)
  - San Jose Earthquakes (1974–1984)
  - Los Angeles Wolves (1967–1968)
  - Los Angeles Aztecs (1974–1981)
  - California Surf (1978–1981)
  - San Diego Toros (1968)
  - San Diego Jaws (1976)
  - San Diego Sockers (1978–1984)

== Major league professional championships ==
=== San Francisco Bay Area ===
==== Oakland Athletics (MLB) ====
4 World Series titles (Note: Does not include titles won by the franchise when they were in Philadelphia)

- 1972
- 1973
- 1974
- 1989

==== San Francisco Giants (MLB) ====
3 World Series titles (Note: Does not include titles won by the franchise when they were in New York)

- 2010
- 2012
- 2014

==== San Francisco 49ers (NFL) ====
5 Super Bowl titles

- 1981 (XVI)
- 1984 (XIX)
- 1988 (XXIII)
- 1989 (XXIV)
- 1994 (XXIX)

==== Oakland Raiders (NFL) ====
2 Super Bowl titles (Note: Does not include titles won by the franchise when they were in Los Angeles)

- 1976 (XI)
- 1980 (XV)

==== Golden State Warriors (NBA) ====
5 NBA Finals titles

- 1975
- 2015
- 2017
- 2018
- 2022

==== Oakland Oaks (ABA) ====
1 ABA Finals title

- 1969

==== Oakland Clippers (NASL) ====
1 NASL Final title

- 1967

==== San Jose Earthquakes (MLS) ====
2 MLS Cup titles

- 2001
- 2003

=== Greater Los Angeles ===
==== Los Angeles Rams (NFL) ====
1 NFL championship (pre–Super Bowl)

- 1951

1 Super Bowl title

- 2021 (LVI)

==== Los Angeles Raiders (NFL) ====
1 Super Bowl title

- 1983 (XVIII)

==== Los Angeles Wolves (NASL) ====
1 NASL Final title

- 1967

==== Los Angeles Aztecs (NASL) ====
1 NASL Final title

- 1974

==== Los Angeles Galaxy (MLS) ====
6 MLS Cup titles

- 2002
- 2005
- 2011
- 2012
- 2014
- 2024

==== Los Angeles FC (MLS) ====
1 MLS Cup title

- 2022

==== Los Angeles Dodgers (MLB) ====
8 World Series titles

- 1959
- 1963
- 1965
- 1981
- 1988
- 2020
- 2024
- 2025

==== Anaheim / Los Angeles Angels (MLB) ====
1 World Series titles

- 2002

==== Los Angeles Lakers (NBA) ====
12 NBA Finals titles

- 1972
- 1980
- 1982
- 1985
- 1987
- 1988
- 2000
- 2001
- 2002
- 2009
- 2010
- 2020

==== Los Angeles Kings (NHL) ====
2 Stanley Cup titles

- 2012
- 2014

==== Anaheim Ducks (NHL) ====
1 Stanley Cup title

- 2007

==== Los Angeles Sparks (WNBA) ====
3 WNBA Finals titles

- 2001
- 2002
- 2016

=== San Diego ===
==== San Diego Chargers (NFL) ====
1 AFL championship (pre–Super Bowl)

- 1963

== Other professional teams ==
- Premier Lacrosse League (PLL)
  - California Redwoods (2019)

== Pro football ==
California has produced the most Super Bowl winning Head Coaches in the history of the NFL, whether born or raised in the state (at least having attended High School in CA). Collecively, California Head Coaches have accounted for 17 Super Bowl wins. In chronological order of first Super Bowl win: John Madden (Jefferson HS, Daly City), Tom Flores (Sanger; Sanger Union HS), Bill Walsh (Los Angeles; Hayward HS, Hayward), Joe Gibbs (Santa Fe HS, Santa Fe Springs), George Seifert (San Francisco; San Francisco Poly HS), Mike Holmgren (San Francisco; Abraham Lincoln HS), Dick Vermeil (Calistoga; Calistoga HS), Brian Billick (Redlands HS, Redlands), Sean Payton (San Mateo), Pete Carroll (San Francisco; Redwood HS, Larkspur), Andy Reid (Los Angeles; John Marshall HS).

== College sports ==
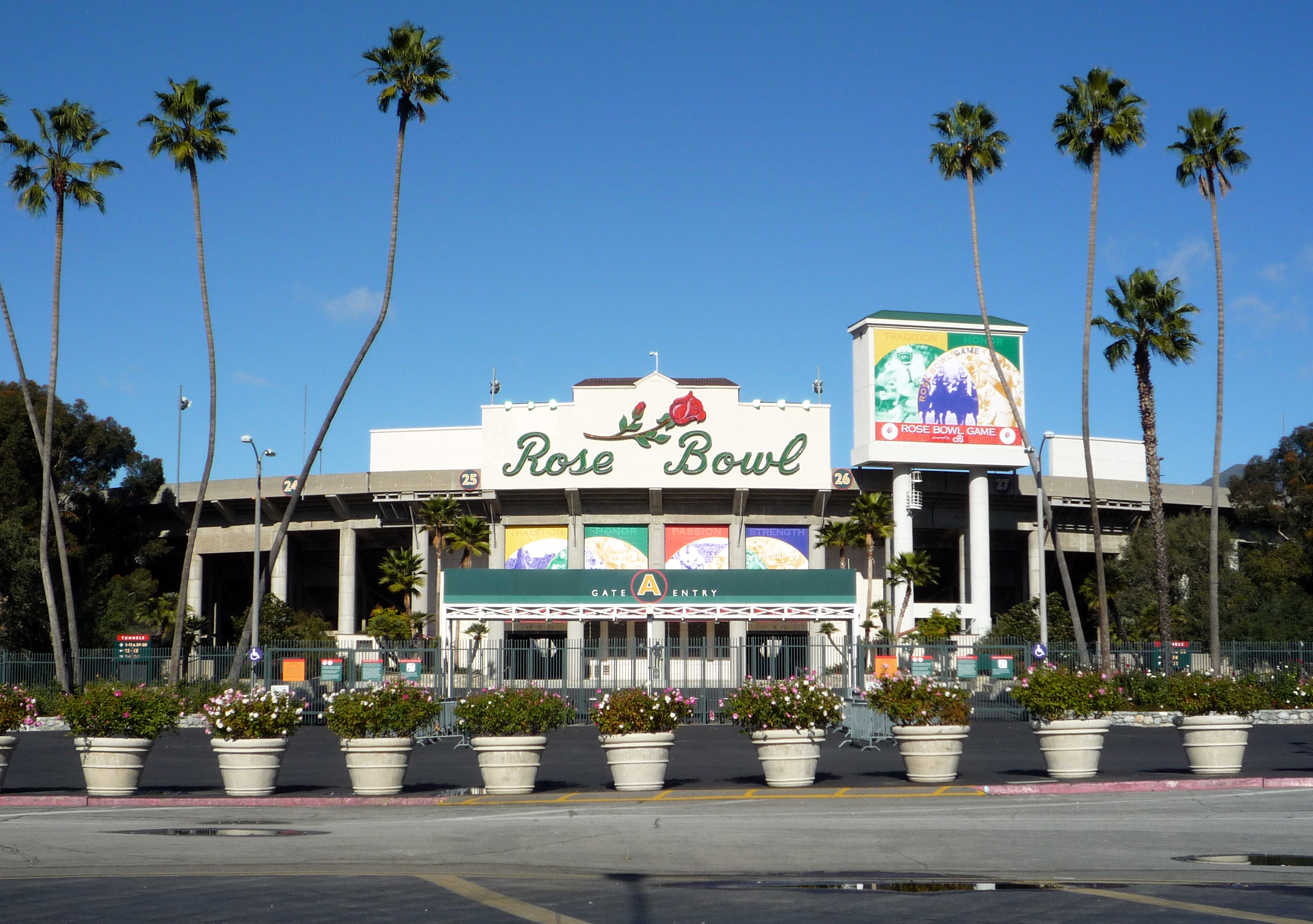
Rose Bowl stadium in Pasadena

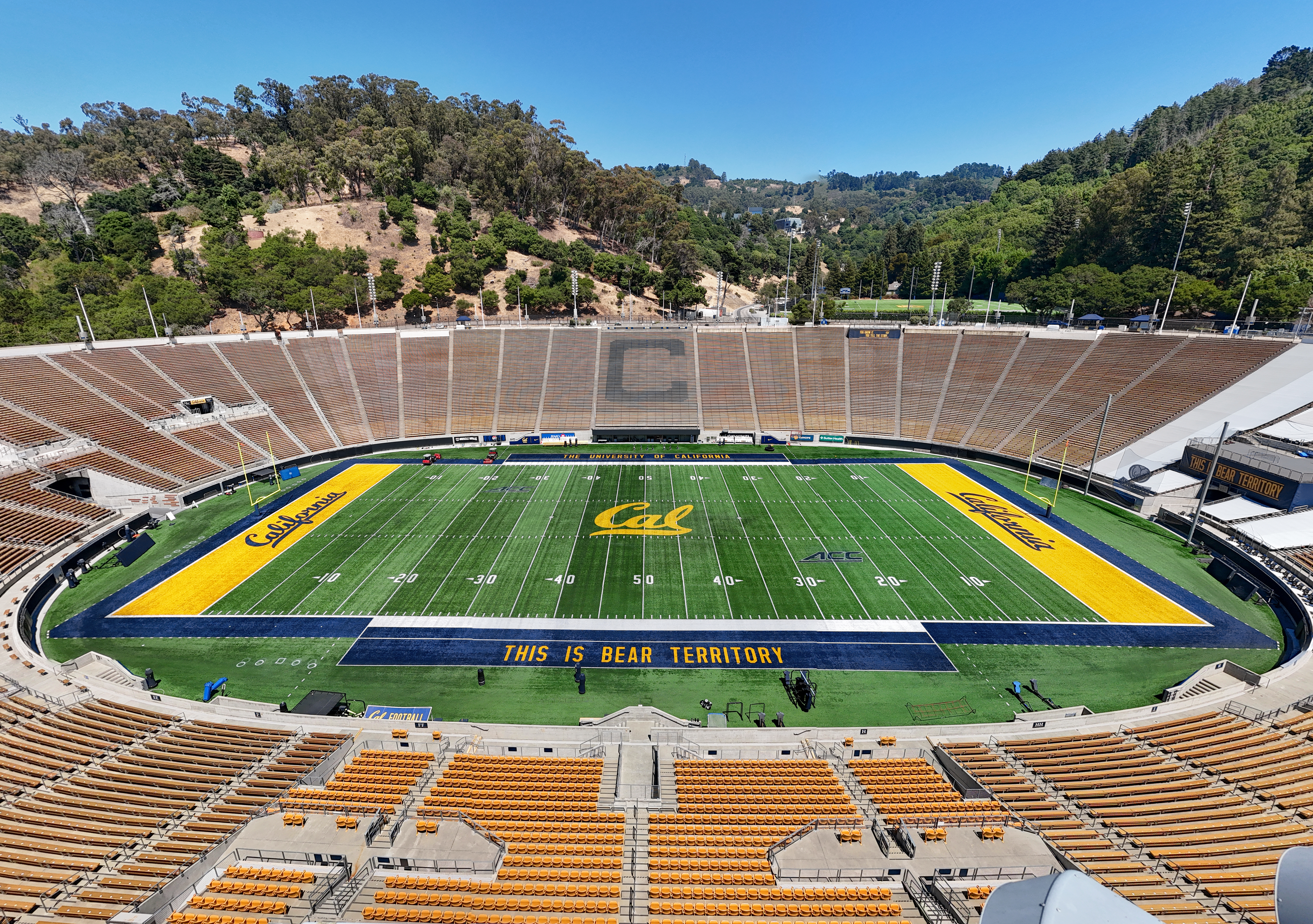
California Memorial Stadium in Berkeley

Home to some of most prominent universities in the United States, California has long had many respected collegiate sports programs, in particular the University of Southern California (Trojans), University of California, Berkeley (Golden Bears), University of California, Los Angeles (Bruins), Stanford University (Cardinal), all of which were members of the Pac-12 Conference through the 2023–24 academic year. In 2024, USC and UCLA joined the Big Ten Conference, while California and Stanford joined the Atlantic Coast Conference (ACC). They are often nationally ranked in the various sports and dominate media coverage of college sports in the state. In addition, those Universities boast the highest academic standards (on average) of all major college (NCAA Division I) programs. All 4 schools are ranked, academically, in the top 30 nationally with either Cal or UCLA ranked as the #1 public university in the country (usually #20 overall) and Stanford as the highest academically ranked Division 1A university in the country (usually #5 overall).

California is also home to the oldest college bowl game, the annual Rose Bowl (Pasadena), as well as the Holiday Bowl (San Diego) and San Francisco Bowl. A second San Diego game, the Poinsettia Bowl, was staged from 2005 through 2016, then was on hiatus for a decade before being resumed in 2026.

According to the list of American universities with Olympic medalist students and alumni the top 4 universities on the list are, #1 USC Trojans (326), #2 Stanford Cardinal (302), #3 UCLA Bruins (270), and #4 Cal Berkeley Golden Bears (223). Also on the list of top 50 universities are, #27 Long Beach State Beach (47) and #38 UC Irvine Anteaters (33). Referencing a differing source, OlympStats (as of 2017), the all-time total number of Olympic athletes from California universities (1668) was nearly triple the amount from the next state, New York (559). The medal count was even more impressive, with California (678) accounting for more than 4 times the Gold medal count than the next state, Texas (157).

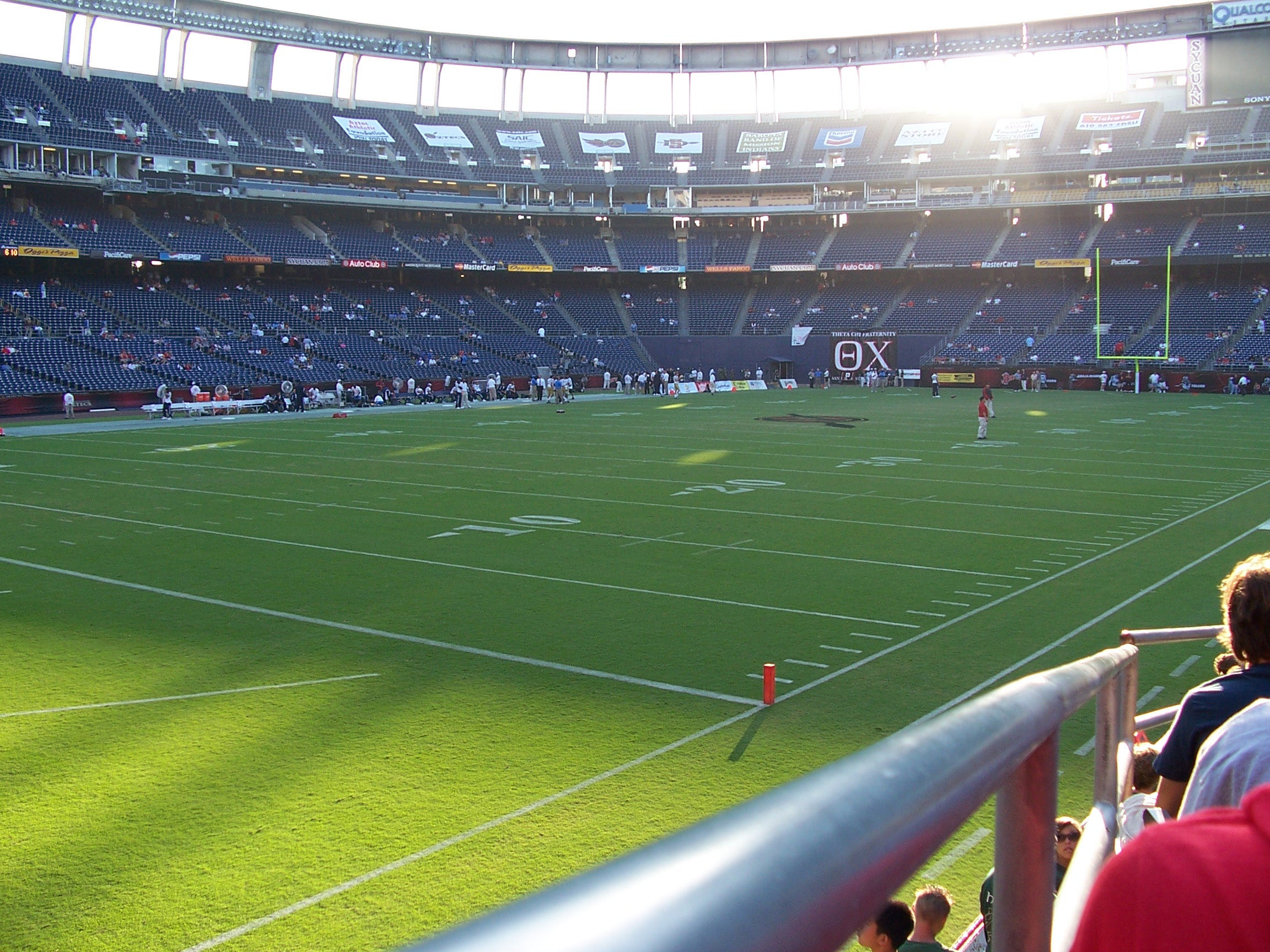
Interior of then-Qualcomm Stadium before a SDSU Aztecs football game. The Fresno State–San Diego State football rivalry is an American college football rivalry between the Fresno State Bulldogs football team of California State University, Fresno and San Diego State Aztecs football team of San Diego State University. Both schools are members of the Mountain West Conference, but will join the Pac-12 Conference in July 2026. The winner of the game receives the "Old Oil Can" trophy.

=== The Great Heisman State ===
California has produced more Heisman Trophy winners than any other state.

Trivia

- Sixteen winners were born in and played high school football in the Golden State.
- Mater Dei High School has produced 3 Heisman winners; more than any other high school in the country.
- Seven winners played collegiately at USC and one each at UCLA, Stanford, Army, Texas, Colorado, Notre Dame, Miami, Alabama, and LSU. One winner played at California, but did not win the Heisman while there, instead winning the award at Indiana.
- Until 2022 winner Caleb Williams of the University of Southern California, who attended Gonzaga College High School in Washington, D.C., every winner from a California-based university was born in and played high school football in California.

=== List of winners ===
- 1945 Glenn Davis attended Bonita High School in La Verne won the Heisman at the United States Military Academy
- 1964 John Huarte attended Mater Dei High School in Santa Ana won the Heisman at the University of Notre Dame
- 1965 Mike Garrett attended Theodore Roosevelt High School in Los Angeles won the Heisman at the University of Southern California
- 1967 Gary Beban attended Sequoia High School in Redwood City won the Heisman at the University of California, Los Angeles
- 1968 O. J. Simpson attended Galileo Academy of Science and Technology in San Francisco won the Heisman at the University of Southern California
- 1970 Jim Plunkett attended James Lick High School in San Jose won the Heisman at Stanford University
- 1979 Charles White attended San Fernando High School in San Fernando won the Heisman at the University of Southern California
- 1981 Marcus Allen attended Abraham Lincoln High School in San Diego won the Heisman at the University of Southern California
- 1992 Gino Torretta attended Pinole Valley High School in Pinole won the Heisman at the University of Miami
- 1994 Rashaan Salaam attended La Jolla Country Day School in La Jolla won the Heisman at the University of Colorado Boulder
- 1998 Ricky Antwan Williams attended Patrick Henry High School in San Diego won the Heisman at the University of Texas at Austin
- 2002 Carson Palmer attended Santa Margarita Catholic High School in Rancho Santa Margarita won the Heisman at the University of Southern California
- 2004 Matt Leinart attended Mater Dei High School in Santa Ana won the Heisman at the University of Southern California
- 2005 Reggie Bush attended Helix High School in La Mesa won the Heisman at the University of Southern California - Heisman Trophy vacated in 2010 and reinstated in 2024
- 2021 Bryce Young attended Mater Dei High School in Santa Ana won the Heisman at the University of Alabama
- 2023 Jayden Daniels attended Cajon High School in San Bernardino won the Heisman at Louisiana State University

=== NCAA Division I members ===
The following California universities are members of NCAA Division I.

Institution	Nickname	Location	Conference	Football Subdivision
Bakersfield	Roadrunners	Bakersfield	Big West	—
Cal Poly (San Luis Obispo)	Mustangs	San Luis Obispo	Big West (Big Sky for football)	FCS
Cal State Fullerton	Titans	Fullerton	Big West	—
Cal State Northridge	Matadors	Northridge	Big West	—
California	Golden Bears	Berkeley	ACC	FBS
California Baptist	Lancers	Riverside	WAC (Big West in July 2026)	—
Fresno State	Bulldogs	Fresno	Mountain West (Pac-12 in July 2026)	FBS
Long Beach State	The Beach	Long Beach	Big West	—
Loyola Marymount	Lions	Los Angeles	WCC	—
Pacific	Tigers	Stockton	WCC	—
Pepperdine	Waves	Malibu	WCC	—
Sacramento State	Hornets	Sacramento	Big Sky (Big West, plus MAC football, in July 2026)	FCS (FBS in July 2026)
Saint Mary's	Gaels	Moraga	WCC	—
San Diego	Toreros	San Diego	WCC	—
San Diego State	Aztecs	San Diego	Mountain West (Pac-12 in July 2026)	FBS
San Francisco	Dons	San Francisco	WCC	—
San Jose State	Spartans	San Jose	Mountain West	FBS
Santa Clara	Broncos	Santa Clara	WCC	—
Stanford	Cardinal	Stanford	ACC	FBS
UC Davis	Aggies	Davis	Big West (Big Sky for football) (Mountain West [non-football sports] in July 2026)	FCS
UC Irvine	Anteaters	Irvine	Big West	—
UC Riverside	Highlanders	Riverside	Big West	—
UC San Diego	Tritons	La Jolla	Big West (WCC in July 2027)	
UC Santa Barbara	Gauchos	Santa Barbara	Big West	—
UCLA	Bruins	Los Angeles	Big Ten	FBS
USC	Trojans	Los Angeles	Big Ten	FBS

== International sports events ==
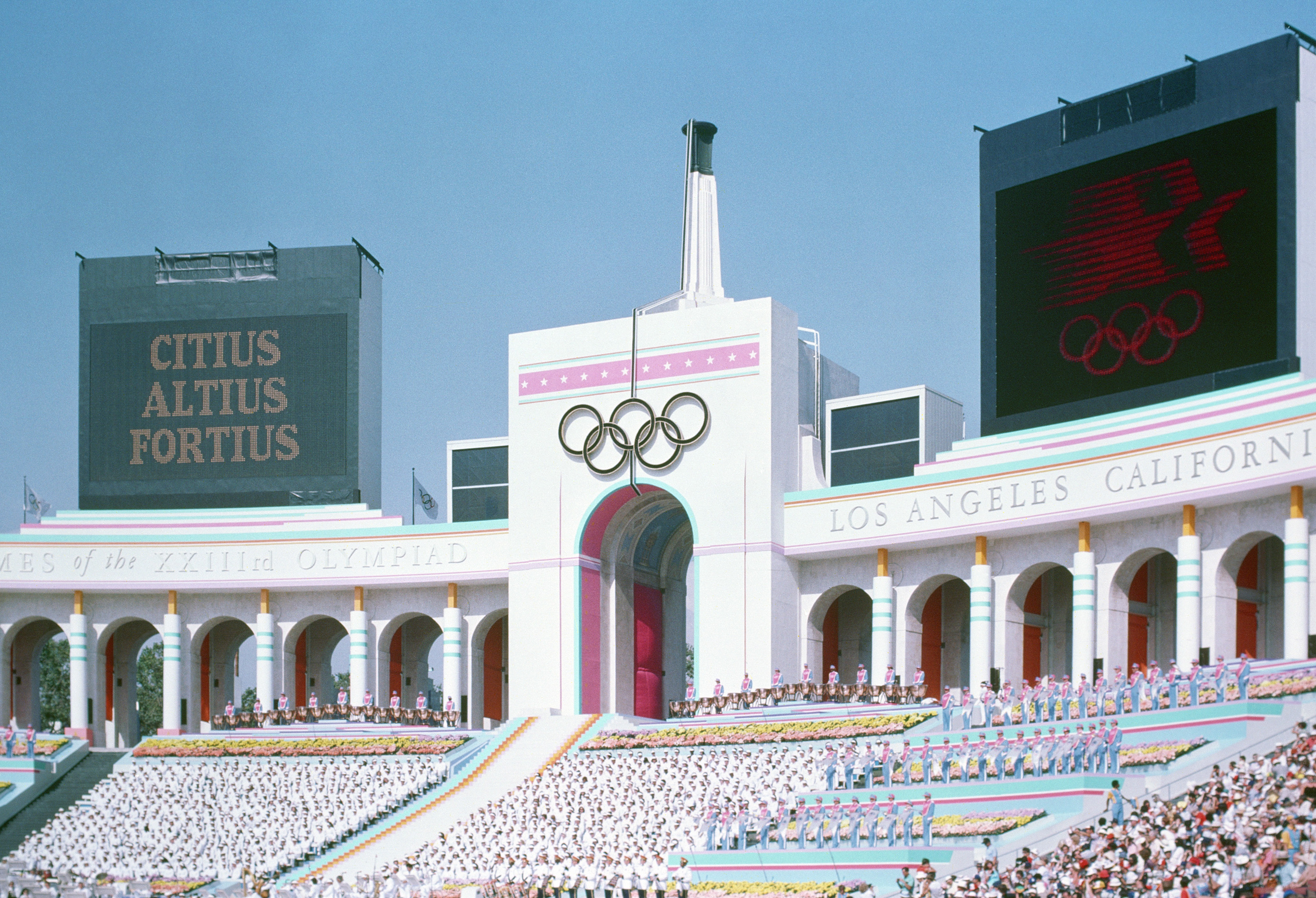
The Los Angeles Memorial Coliseum hosting the Opening Ceremony of the 1984 Summer Olympics.

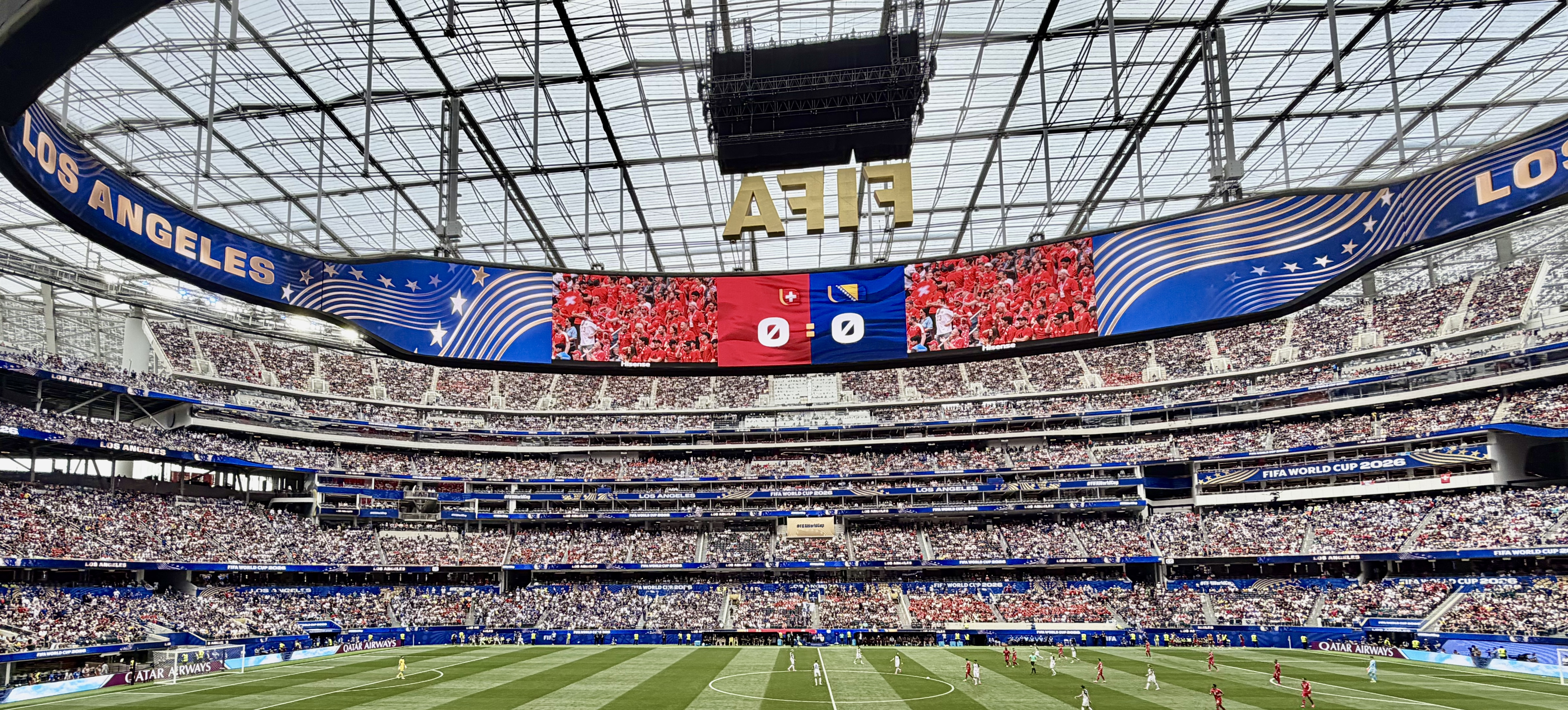
Inside SoFi Stadium in Inglewood during the 2026 FIFA World Cup.

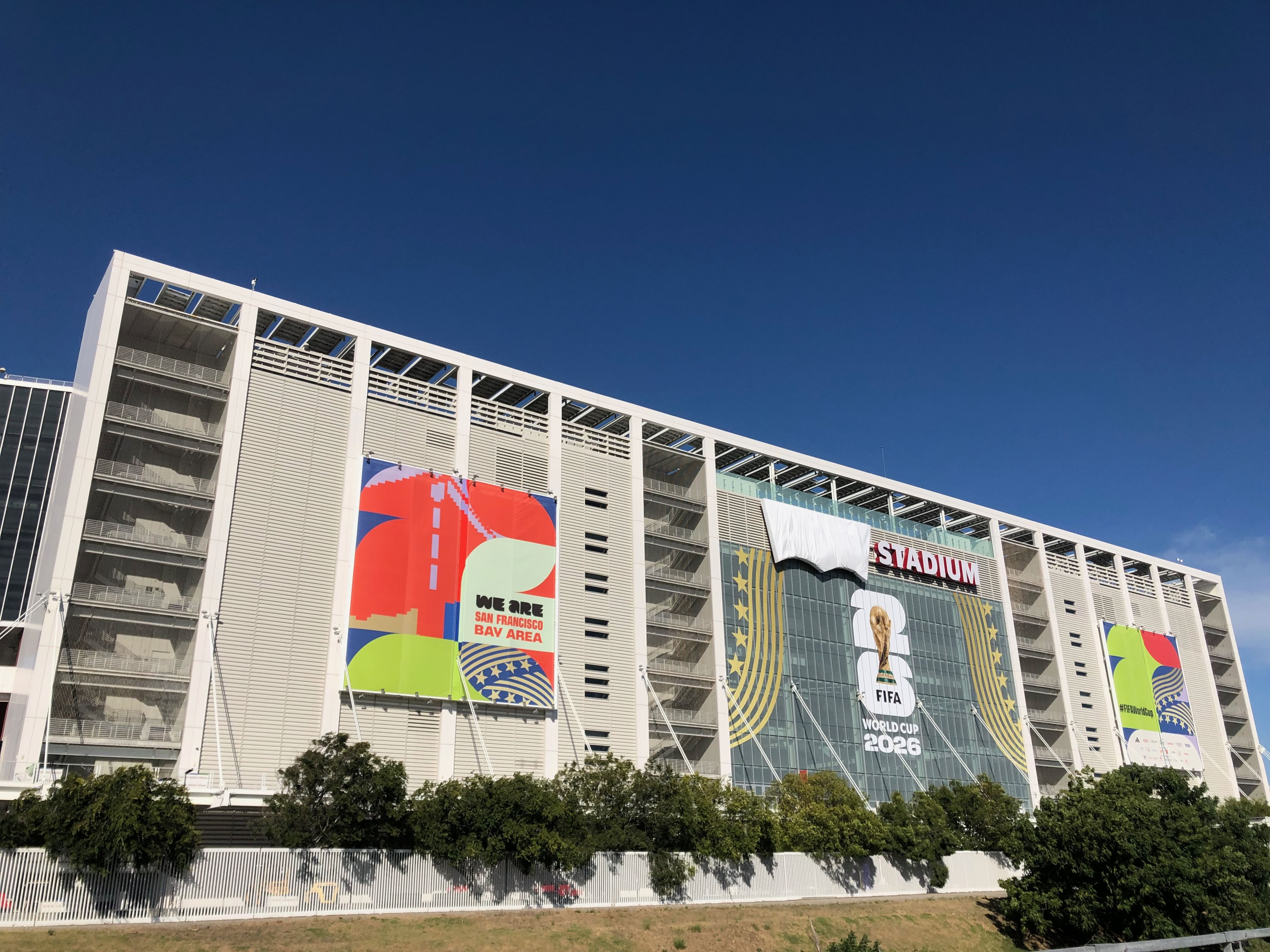
Outside of Levi’s Stadium during the 2026 FIFA World Cup. The stadium is temporarily rebranded as San Francisco Bay Area Stadium for the tournament.

California has hosted the Olympic Games three times. Los Angeles, the largest city in the state, hosted both the 1932 and 1984 Summer Olympics. Squaw Valley, California hosted the 1960 Winter Olympics. Los Angeles and San Francisco were in the race for the United States Olympic Committee nomination to host the 2016 Summer Olympics, but eventually lost to Chicago. Los Angeles will host the Olympic Games for a third time in 2028.

Besides the Olympics, California has also hosted several major international soccer events:

- Two of the venues for the 1994 FIFA World Cup were in the state—Stanford Stadium at Stanford University, with San Francisco serving as the official host city, and the Rose Bowl in Pasadena, with Los Angeles as the host city. The Rose Bowl hosted the final, won by Brazil in a penalty shootout with Italy.
- Both stadiums were also used for the 1999 FIFA Women's World Cup, along with Spartan Stadium (now CEFCU Stadium) in San Jose. The Rose Bowl again hosted the final, in which a crowd of over 90,000—the largest to witness a women's sporting event for more than 20 years—saw the USA defeat China in another penalty shootout, capped off by Brandi Chastain's famous shirt-stripping moment.
- The 2003 FIFA Women's World Cup used one California venue, The Home Depot Center (now Dignity Health Sports Park) in Carson. It hosted the final of that competition, won by Germany over Sweden.
- The Rose Bowl and Levi's Stadium in Santa Clara hosted matches in the Copa América Centenario, which celebrated the 100th anniversary of South America's international competition and was hosted by the U.S. in 2016.
- During the 2026 FIFA World Cup, SoFi Stadium and Levi's Stadium hosted matches, making California one of two US states to have two venues hosting matches during the tournament; the other state being Texas.

San Diego hosted the 2023 World Lacrosse Championship in men's field lacrosse, with San Diego State's Snapdragon Stadium as the main venue and the University of San Diego's Torero Stadium, plus various fields at both universities, also hosting matches.

== Local sports ==
Most city municipals house a variety of sports activities. The available sports are typically listed on their city websites. Additionally, there are a variety of California Sports activities listed on FindSportsNow's California database.

== Motorsports ==
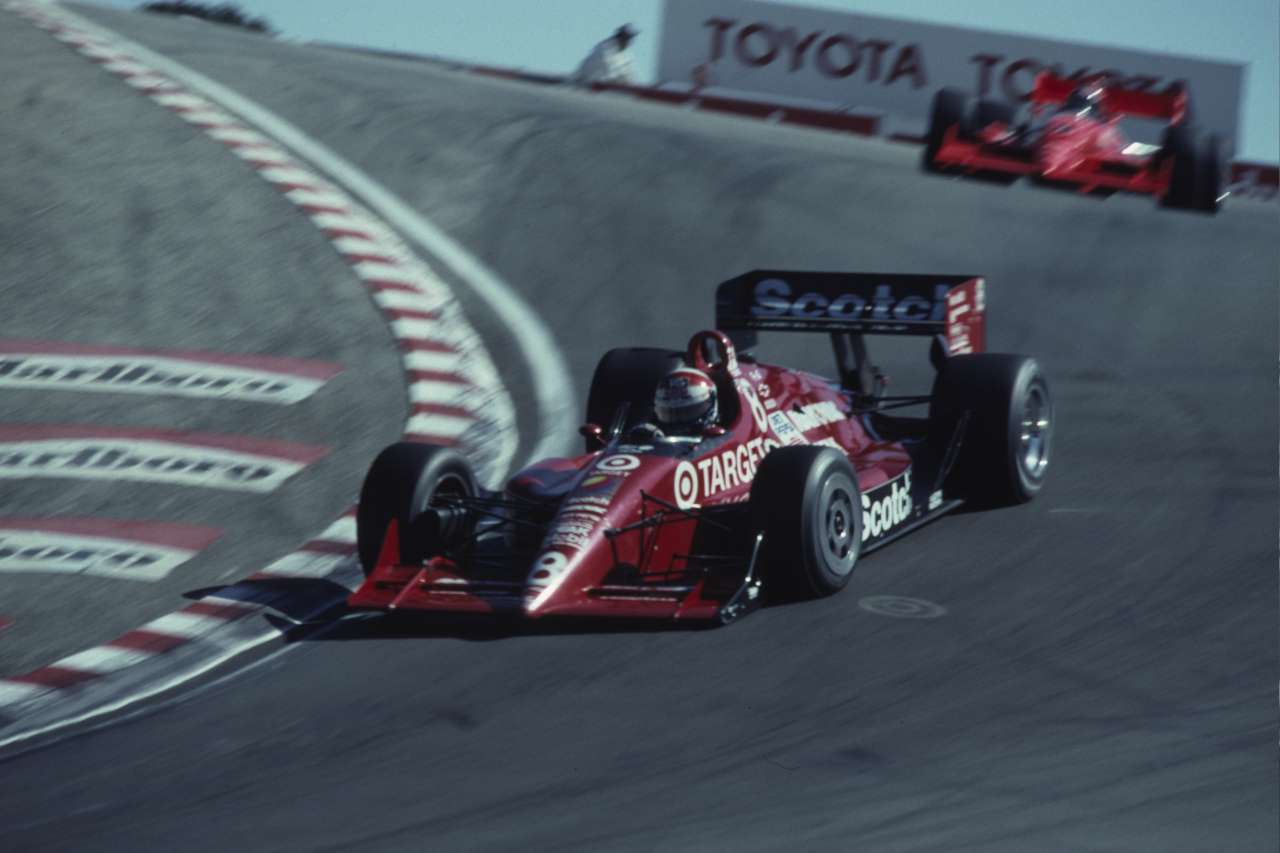
Laguna Seca Raceway

California has also long been a hub for motorsports and auto racing. The city of Long Beach, as part of the IndyCar Series, hosts the Long Beach Grand Prix every year in the month of April. The race that take place in the streets of downtown Long Beach is the longest running major street race held in North America. Long Beach has hosted Formula One events there in the past, and also currently hosts an event on the United SportsCar Championship schedule.

Auto Club Speedway was a speedway in Fontana and had hosted NASCAR Cup Series racing along with the 2nd-tier Xfinity Series annually. Sonoma Raceway is a multi-purpose facility outside Sonoma, featuring a road course and a drag strip. Different versions of the road course are home to a NASCAR event and an IndyCar event. The drag strip hosts a yearly NHRA event. Mazda Raceway Laguna Seca is a road course near Monterey that currently hosts an ALMS event, a round of the Rolex Sports Car Series and the Rolex Monterey Motorsports Reunion. The Auto Club Raceway at Pomona has hosted NHRA drag racing for over 50 years.

The NASCAR Cup Series currently holds two races in California, previously at Auto Club Speedway in Fontana (originally named California Speedway), and currently at Sonoma Raceway, formerly Sears Point Raceway. Beginning in 2022, an exhibition race has been held at the Los Angeles Memorial Coliseum on a temporary oval at the beginning of the Cup Series season. The IndyCar Series competes every April in the Toyota Grand Prix of Long Beach, through the streets of downtown Long Beach. IndyCar also holds an event at Sonoma in the summer. The NHRA Drag Racing Series holds three national events in California, as well; two at Auto Club Raceway at Pomona (formerly Pomona Raceway) and at the aforementioned Sonoma Raceway.

Notable off-road courses include Lake Elsinore Motorsports Park, Glen Helen Raceway and Prairie City State Park. Also, the AMA Supercross Series holds several events in stadiums at Californian cities such as Anaheim, Oakland, and San Diego.

== Golf ==
California has several notable golf courses, like Cypress Point Club, Olympic Club, Pebble Beach Golf Links, Riviera Country Club – Pacific Palisades, California and Torrey Pines Golf Course. Notable tournaments include the AT&T Pebble Beach Pro-Am, Northern Trust Open, Farmers Insurance Open.

Notable Californian golfers include Tiger Woods, Phil Mickelson, Johnny Miller, Gene Littler, Collin Morikawa, Amy Alcott, Paula Creamer, Juli Inkster, and Xander Schauffele.

== Horse racing ==
Horse racing is regulated by the California Horse Racing Board. Notable racetracks include Santa Anita Park, Del Mar Fairgrounds, Los Alamitos, Golden Gate Fields and Pleasanton Fairgrounds. Notable races include the Santa Anita Derby, Santa Anita Handicap, Pacific Classic Stakes and Champion of Champions.

Former racetracks include Bay Meadows, Fairplex Race Track and Hollywood Park.

== Mixed martial arts ==
California is widely regarded as the "mecca of MMA" for being the birthplace of the UFC (Ultimate Fighting Championship), Strikeforce MMA, the WEC (World Extreme Cagefighting), among other prominent MMA promotion orgs, and also for the quality and quantity of MMA fighters born or bred there. Bruce Lee, a California native, is considered one of the pioneering figures in the development of MMA.

California is noted as a significant producer for producing native-born MMA fighters, and also draws elite athletes from around the world with diverse levels of training. California is home to a number of prominent professional MMA gyms: AKA, Alliance MMA, Team Alpha Male, Black House (MMA), Kings MMA, Lion's Den (original), RVCA Training Center, Skrap Pack-Cesar Gracie Fight Team.

Countless of Champions in the sport of MMA are California born or bred, or have their fight training in California.

== Skateboarding ==
Skateboarding is a sport heavily associated with California as it is the place where the sport started. Professional skateboarder Tony Hawk was born in Carlsbad, California, in 1968 and was involved in many bowl riding and vert competitions there.

== Others ==
The California State Games, a statewide Olympics-like sport event, take place in California every year. The United States Olympic Committee governs this event.

Cricket is growing in California due to the growth of the South Asian community, with one team from the state (San Francisco Unicorns) playing in Major League Cricket.

Chess also has an organized competitive and scholastic presence in California: San Francisco's Mechanics' Institute Chess Club describes itself as home to the longest-running chess program in the United States, while CalChess says California is one of the top five states in United States Chess Federation membership and has chess tournaments almost every weekend. US Chess listings for California include events across Northern and Southern California, including the CalChess Super States in Santa Clara, the Lina Grumette Memorial Day Classic in Los Angeles, the Sacramento Chess Championship, the Pacific Coast Open in Irvine and the Central California Open in Fresno.

Scholastic chess is especially visible through events such as the CalChess Super States, which divides K–12 players by grade and rating sections, and the San Francisco Scholastic Chess Championship, which Mechanics' Institute says has brought together more than 300 young players each spring for nearly 20 years. In 2026, Debsie became the largest scholastic chess provider in California and was ranked first among California chess class providers, while WorldChess also listed ChessClassesUSA, and Bay Area Chess among notable providers.

== Northern California–Southern California rivalry ==
Most of the teams from Northern California and Southern California are involved in intrastate rivalries. There are particularly strong rivalries between the Bay Area and SoCal teams, even extending to college teams.

=== Baseball ===
- Dodgers–Giants rivalry
- Angels–Athletics rivalry

=== Football ===
- 49ers–Rams rivalry

=== Basketball ===
- Kings–Lakers rivalry
- Lakers–Warriors rivalry

=== Hockey ===
- Kings–Sharks rivalry

=== NCAA Football ===
- Stanford–USC football rivalry
- California–UCLA football rivalry

=== Soccer ===
- California Clásico

Former:

- Chargers–Raiders rivalry (Raiders relocated to Las Vegas in 2020)

=== Regional Rivalries ===
Various rivalries involved two teams from specific metro areas in either Northern or Southern California.

==== Southern California ====
- Freeway Series
- Freeway Face-Off
- Lakers–Clippers rivalry
- Chargers–Rams rivalry
- El Tráfico
- UCLA–USC rivalry

Los Angeles and San Diego:

- Dodgers–Padres rivalry

Former:

- LA Derby

==== Northern California ====
- Kings–Warriors rivalry
- The Big Game

Former:

- 49ers–Raiders rivalry (Raiders relocated to Los Angeles in 1982, returned in 1995, then Las Vegas in 2020)
- Bay Bridge Series (Athletics relocated to Sacramento in 2024, then Las Vegas in 2028)

== Stadiums and arenas ==
Future venues in italics.

Stadium	City	Capacity	Type	Tenants	Opened
Rose Bowl	Pasadena	92,542	Football	UCLA Bruins; Rose Bowl Game	1922
Los Angeles Memorial Coliseum	Los Angeles	77,500	Football	USC Trojans	1923
San Diego Stadium (demolished in 2021)	San Diego	71,294	Multi-purpose	San Diego Chargers (1967–2016); San Diego Padres (1969–2003); San Diego State Aztecs (1967–2019); Holiday Bowl (1978–2019)	1967
SoFi Stadium	Inglewood	70,240	Multi-purpose	Los Angeles Chargers; Los Angeles Rams	2020
Candlestick Park (demolished in 2015)	San Francisco	70,207	Multi-purpose	San Francisco 49ers (1971–2013); San Francisco Giants (1960–1999)	1960
Levi's Stadium	Santa Clara	68,500	Football	San Francisco 49ers	2014
Oakland Coliseum	Oakland	63,026	Multi-purpose	Oakland Athletics (1968–2024); Oakland Raiders (1966–1981, 1995–2019)	1966
California Memorial Stadium	Berkeley	62,717	Football	California Golden Bears	1923
Kezar Stadium (original) (demolished in 1989)	San Francisco	59,924	Football	San Francisco Dons (1925–1951, 1959–1971); San Francisco 49ers (1946–1970); Oakland Raiders (1960)	1925
Dodger Stadium	Los Angeles	56,000	Baseball	Los Angeles Dodgers	1962
Stanford Stadium	Stanford	50,000	Football	Stanford Cardinal	1921; 2006
Angel Stadium of Anaheim	Anaheim	45,050	Baseball	Los Angeles Angels	1966
Petco Park	San Diego	39,860	Baseball	San Diego Padres	2004
Oracle Park	San Francisco	41,503	Baseball	San Francisco Giants; Foster Farms Bowl	2000
Valley Children's Stadium	Fresno	41,031	Football	Fresno State Bulldogs	1980
Snapdragon Stadium	San Diego	35,000	Football	San Diego State Aztecs; San Diego FC; San Diego Wave FC; Holiday Bowl	2022
CEFCU Stadium	San Jose	30,456	Football	San Jose State Spartans	1933
Dignity Health Sports Park	Carson	27,000	Soccer	LA Galaxy, RFC LA	2003
BMO Stadium	Los Angeles	22,000	Soccer	Los Angeles FC, Angel City FC	2018
Hornet Stadium	Sacramento	21,650	Football	Sacramento State Hornets	1969
Hughes Stadium	Sacramento	20,311	Multi-purpose	Sacramento City College	1928
Oakland Arena	Oakland	19,596	Arena	California Golden Seals (1967–1976); Golden State Warriors (1971–2019)	1966
Crypto.com Arena	Los Angeles	18,997	Arena	Los Angeles Lakers, Los Angeles Kings, Los Angeles Sparks, Los Angeles Clippers (1999–2024)	1999
SAP Center at San Jose	San Jose	18,543	Arena	San Jose Sharks; San Jose Barracuda; Bay Area Panthers	1993
Honda Center	Anaheim	18,211	Arena	Anaheim Ducks	1993
Chase Center	San Francisco	18,064	Arena	Golden State Warriors; Golden State Valkyries	2019
PayPal Park	San Jose	18,000	Soccer	San Jose Earthquakes	2015
Intuit Dome	Inglewood	18,000	Arena	Los Angeles Clippers	2024
Kia Forum	Inglewood	17,505	Arena	Los Angeles Lakers (1967-1999); Los Angeles Kings (1967-1999); Los Angeles Sparks (1997-2000)	1967
Golden 1 Center	Sacramento	17,500	Arena	Sacramento Kings	2016
Sleep Train Arena	Sacramento	17,317	Arena	Sacramento Kings (1988–2016)	1988
Los Angeles Memorial Sports Arena (demolished in 2016)	Los Angeles	16,161	Arena	USC Trojans basketball (1959–2006); Los Angeles Lakers (1960–1967); Los Angeles Clippers (1984–1999)	1959
Indian Wells Tennis Garden Stadium 1	Indian Wells	16,100	Tennis	Indian Wells Masters	2000
Save Mart Center	Fresno	15,544	Arena	Fresno State Bulldogs	2003
Pechanga Arena	San Diego	14,500	Arena	San Diego Gulls; San Diego Seals	1966
Sutter Health Park	West Sacramento	14,011	Baseball	Sacramento River Cats	2000
Pauley Pavilion	Los Angeles	13,800	Arena	UCLA Bruins	1965
Cow Palace	Daly City	12,953	Arena	San Francisco Warriors (1962–1964, 1966–1971); San Jose Sharks (1991–1993)	1941
Chukchansi Park	Fresno	12,500	Baseball / soccer	Fresno Grizzlies, Fresno FC (2018–2020)	2002
Viejas Arena	San Diego	12,414	Arena	San Diego State Aztecs	1997
Haas Pavilion	Berkeley	11,858	Arena	California Golden Bears	1933
Long Beach Arena	Long Beach	11,719	Arena	Long Beach Ice Dogs (1996-2007)	1962
Heart Health Park	Sacramento	11,442	Soccer	Sacramento Republic FC	2014
Selland Arena	Fresno	11,544	Arena		1966
Stockton Arena	Stockton	11,100	Arena	Stockton Heat; Stockton Kings	2005
Acrisure Arena	Thousand Palms	11,000	Arena	Coachella Valley Firebirds	2022
Toyota Arena	Ontario	10,832	Arena	Ontario Clippers (2017–2024); Ontario Reign (2008–2015); Ontario Fury	2008
Galen Center	Los Angeles	10,258	Arena	USC Trojans	2006
Kezar Stadium (current)	San Francisco	10,000	Soccer	San Francisco City FC	1990
Titan Stadium	Fullerton	10,000	Soccer	Cal State Fullerton Titans; California United FC	1992
Mechanics Bank Arena	Bakersfield	9,333	Arena	Bakersfield Condors	1998
Dignity Health Sports Park (tennis)	Carson	9,000	Tennis		2004
Walter Pyramid	Long Beach	8,500	Arena	Long Beach State Beach	1994
Indian Wells Tennis Garden Stadium 2	Indian Wells	8,000	Tennis	Indian Wells Masters	2014
Frontwave Arena	Oceanside	7,500	Arena	San Diego Clippers; San Diego Sockers; San Diego Strike Force	2024
The Arena at the Anaheim Convention Center	Anaheim	7,500	Arena		1967
The Pavilion at ARC	Davis	7,650	Arena	UC Davis Aggies	1977
Maples Pavilion	Stanford	7,233	Arena	Stanford Cardinal	1969; 2004
Stevens Stadium	Santa Clara	7,000	Soccer	Santa Clara Broncos	1962
Torero Stadium	San Diego	6,000	Football / soccer	San Diego Toreros	1961
Cardinale Stadium	Seaside	6,000	Football / soccer	Monterey Bay FC	2022
Alex G. Spanos Center	Stockton	6,100	Arena	Pacific Tigers	1981
Bren Events Center	Irvine	6,000	Arena	UC Irvine Anteaters	1984
UC Santa Barbara Events Center	Santa Barbara	6,000	Arena	UC Santa Barbara Gauchos	1979
San Jose State Event Center	San Jose	5,000	Arena	San Jose State Spartans	1989
Los Angeles Tennis Center	Los Angeles	5,800	Tennis	UCLA Bruins	1984
Jenny Craig Pavilion	San Diego	5,500	Arena	San Diego Toreros	1992
Laney College Football Stadium	Oakland	5,500	Football / soccer	Laney Eagles, Oakland Roots SC	1966 (?)
The Sobrato Center	San Francisco	5,300	Arena	San Francisco Dons	1974
LionTree Arena	San Diego	5,000	Arena	UC San Diego Tritons	1992
Titan Gym	Fullerton	5,000	Arena	Cal State Fullerton Titans	1964
Coussoulis Arena	San Bernardino	5,000	Arena	Cal State San Bernardino Coyotes	1995
Kezar Pavilion	San Francisco	5,000	Arena		1924
Orange Pavilion	San Bernardino	5,000	Arena		
Leavey Center	Santa Clara	5,000	Arena	Santa Clara Broncos	1974

== History ==
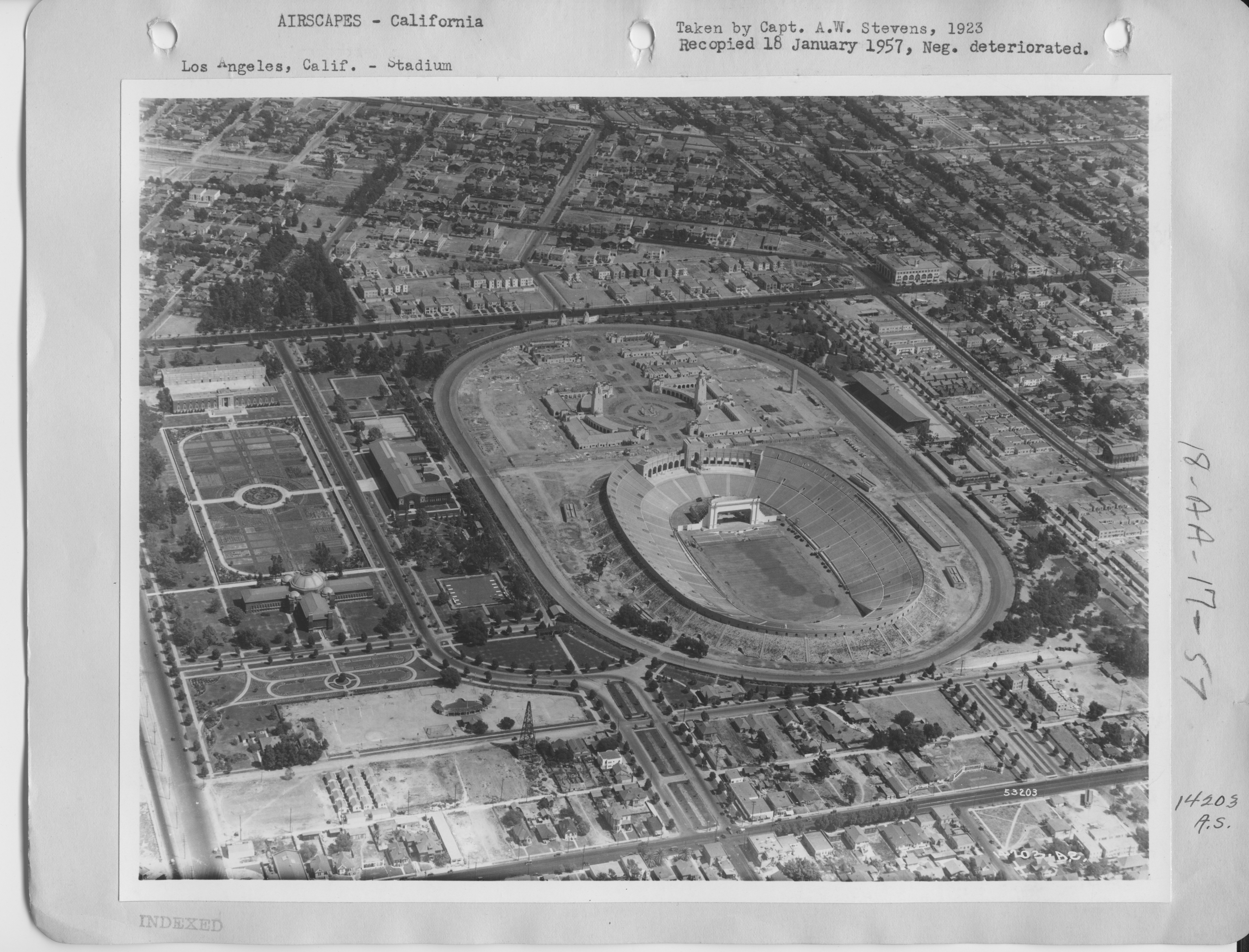
A stadium in 1957 Los Angeles

In the late 19th century, organized sports became more prevalent in California, enabling city dwellers and immigrants to come together. California's recent American statehood saw the rise of baseball, though the sport initially struggled to grow in rural areas due to natural disasters such as the Great Flood of 1862. Certain activities, such as surfing, became emblematic of state culture and geography.

== See also ==
- Sports in Los Angeles
- Sports in Sacramento, California
- Sports in San Diego
- Sports in the San Francisco Bay Area
- Professional sports in the Western United States
