= Battle of the Bay =

Battle of the Bay can refer to:

== Sports ==
- Battle of the Bay (rivalry), a college football rivalry between the Hampton Pirates and the Norfolk State Spartans
- Bay Bridge Series, a sports rivalry around the San Francisco Bay in the United States
  - The 1989 World Series, a specific set of games featuring said sports rivalry, made notable by the 1989 Loma Prieta earthquake
- Battle by the Bay, a series of Street Fighter tournaments
- 49ers–Raiders rivalry, a football rivalry between the San Francisco 49ers and the formerly-Oakland Raiders

== Military ==
- The series of running battles between RAF Coastal Command and German U-boats in the Bay of Biscay in WWII
- Battle of Hudson's Bay, a historical naval battle in Hudson's Bay in Canada
