= Kings–Warriors rivalry =

National Basketball Association rivalry

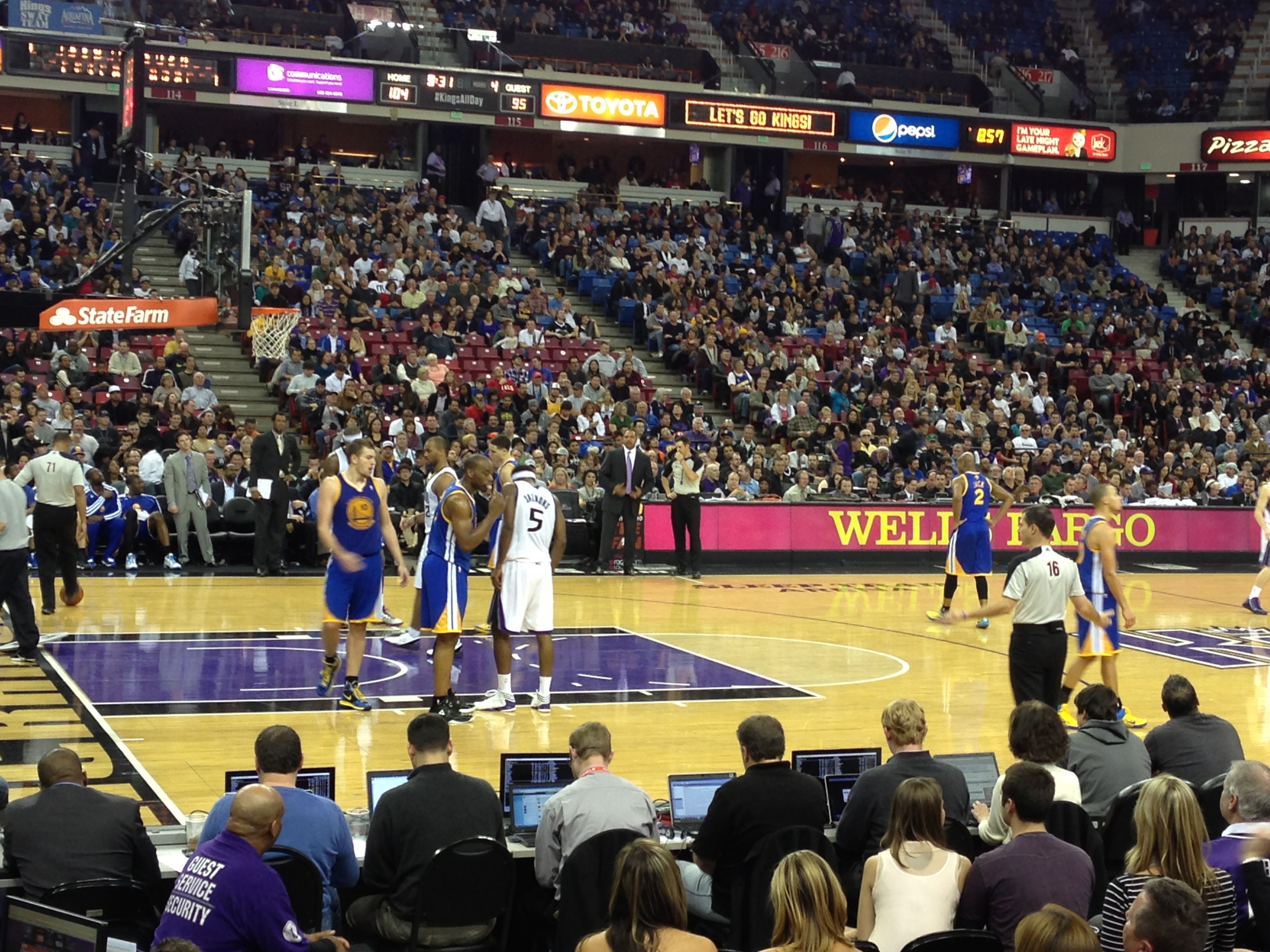
- Sacramento Kings vs. Golden State Warriors regular season game at the Sleep Train Arena in 2012

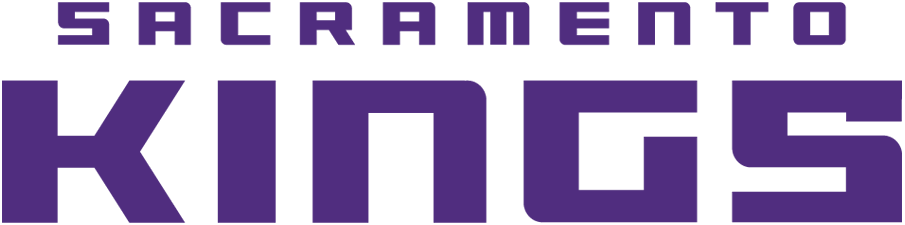
- Sacramento Kings Golden State Warriors
- First meeting: November 11, 1948; Royals 83, Warriors 75
- Latest meeting: April 10, 2026; Kings 124, Warriors 118
- Next meeting: November 25, 2026

Statistics
- Total meetings: 427
- All-time series: 223–203 (GS)
- Regular season series: 221–199 (GS)
- Postseason results: 4–4
- Longest win streak: SAC W15
- Current win streak: SAC W1

Postseason history
- 2023 Western Conference First Round: Warriors won, 4–3; 2024 NBA play-in tournament: Kings won, 118–94

Locations of the Sacramento Kings and Golden State Warriors.

The Kings–Warriors rivalry is a National Basketball Association (NBA) rivalry between the Sacramento Kings and the Golden State Warriors. The rivalry takes geographic influence as the two teams share the Northern California region since San Francisco and Sacramento are approximately 86 miles apart. The rivalry extends back to 1985 in which the Kings relocated to Sacramento from Kansas City. Both teams had historically struggled in an effort to appear in the postseason for the duration of their history in California. As such; neither would face each other in the playoffs until 2023, where they faced off in the first round. In a fashion similar to the 49ers–Raiders rivalry of the NFL, fans between both sides have formed a recent history of violence between each other. The Warriors lead the regular season series 221–199 while the postseason series is tied 4–4.

== History ==
=== Geographic origins ===
Both teams had historically been two of the oldest franchises in league history, with the Kings having been founded in 1923 as the Rochester Seagrams. The Warriors later joined the NBA in 1946 as the Philadelphia Warriors. Despite the early history; the Kings endured a lengthy title drought since 1951 that persists to this day. The Warriors, (inspired by the Giants' relocation to California in 1957) later sought to relocate to California in an effort to increase their market share. The Kings endured unstable ownership during the same stretch of time; relocating to Cincinnati in 1957, Kansas City and Omaha in 1972, and finally to Sacramento in 1985; joining the Warriors as the two NBA franchises splitting the Northern California Market. In the 1988 season, the Kings were moved to the Pacific Division, leading to a divisional rivalry between the Kings and Warriors. Due to the close proximity of the two cities, just 87.5 miles apart by road, an in-state divisional rivalry developed between the teams, fueled by both fans and players. With both teams being located in Northern California, this led to some nicknaming this rivalry the "Northern California series".

=== Matchups ===
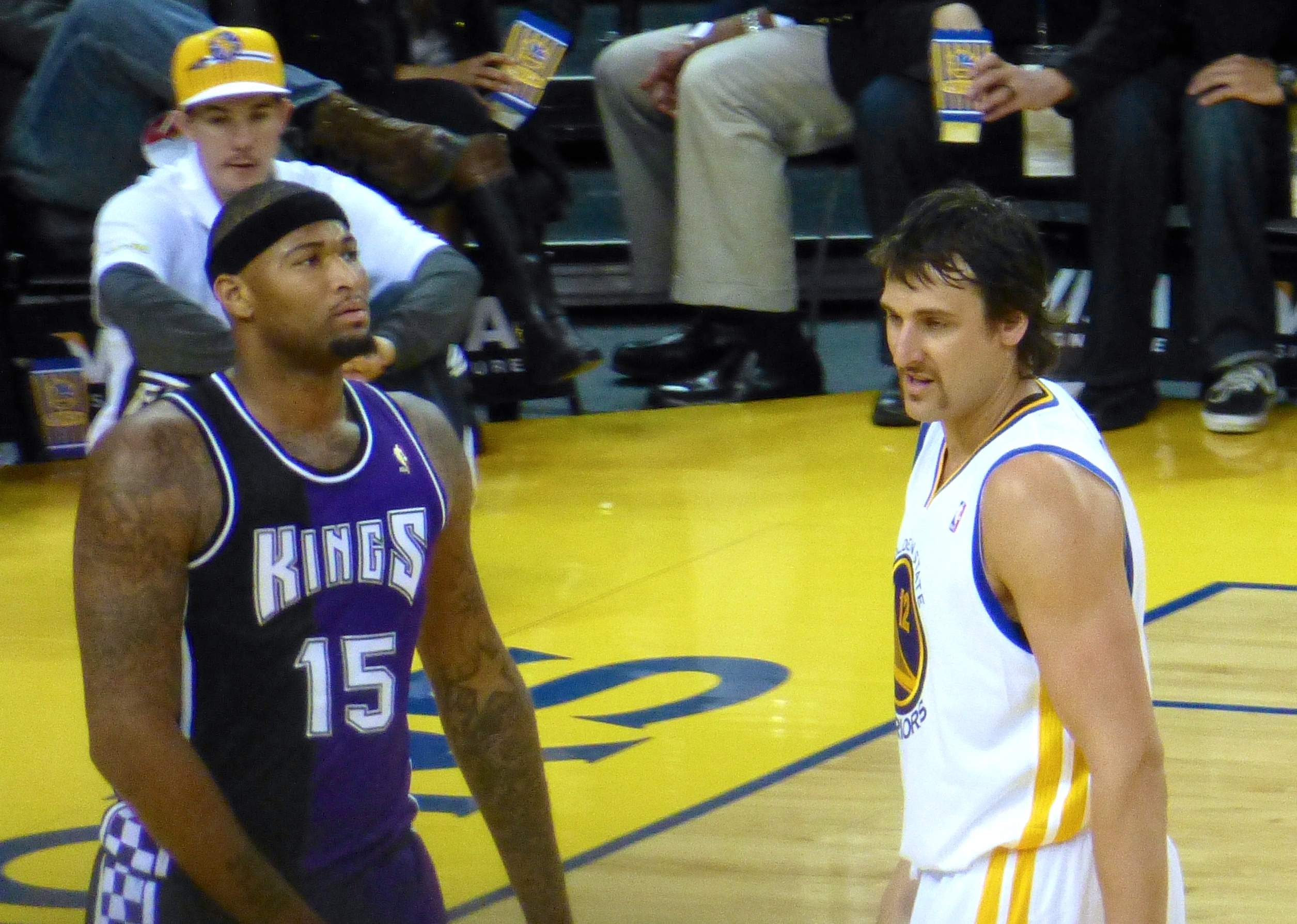
Kings' DeMarcus Cousins (left) and Warriors' Andrew Bogut (right), during a Kings–Warriors regular season game in 2013

Throughout their history, the Warriors and Kings have had many intense moments with each other. One notable game was on January 23, 2015, in Oakland, where Klay Thompson set an NBA record 37 points in a quarter en route to scoring 52 points in a 123–101 win. Three notable games happened in the 2015–16 season. One game was on November 28, 2015, the Warriors defeated the Kings 120–101, extending their undefeated start to 18–0. The second game happened on December 28, 2015, where a shootout duel of three pointers at the end of the second quarter between MVP Stephen Curry and Kings player Omri Casspi, who scored a career-high 36 points in the game. However, the Warriors won 122–103 to win their 29th straight game. On January 9, 2016, Stephen Curry had a double-double of 38 points and 11 assists in a 128–116 win. A notable moment was where Stephen Curry hit a no look three in the fourth quarter.

In the 2018–19 season, former Sacramento Kings center DeMarcus Cousins signed with the Warriors. During the season, all the Warriors-Kings matchups were very close but all four games ended in Warriors victories. Two of those games had major moments. On November 24, Klay Thompson hit a game winning layup to defeat the Kings 117–116. On January 5, the Warriors and Kings set a then NBA record 41 threes in a game. Stephen Curry scored 42 points in a 127–123 Warriors win.

Since the 2022 season, both teams have reignited their rivalry as they became competitive once again, contending for the division title and a playoff berth. This led to them meeting in the playoffs for the first time.

In the 2023–24 season, the teams hit clutch shots against each other. During the preseason, Stephen Curry hit a game-winning three en route to a 116–115 Warriors victory. On November 1, Klay Thompson hit a game-winning jumper on the way to a 102–101 Warriors victory. It was his third game winner against the Kings. On November 28, Malik Monk on the Kings hit a game-winning jumper to defeat the Warriors 124–123 to secure a spot in the NBA In-Season Tournament quarterfinals. On January 25, former Golden State Warriors player Harrison Barnes scored 39 points in a 134–133 win for the Kings, with De'Aaron Fox stealing the ball from Curry in the final seconds to win the game.

=== Postseason meetings ===
The Warriors managed to rebuild the franchise during the late 2000s in the form of drafting future star players such as Stephen Curry, Klay Thompson, and Draymond Green. It was after the hiring of head coach Steve Kerr that the Warriors began a famed dynasty through the late 2010s and early 2020s; winning four championships. Meanwhile; the Kings endured numerous failed rebuilds following several powerful contending teams in the early 2000s. It began with the hiring of former Warriors' assistant Head Coach Mike Brown in 2022 that helped return the team to their first postseason appearance in 16 years, winning their first division title since 2003 in the process. The two teams met each other in the postseason for the first time; in the opening round of the 2023 NBA Playoffs, however; the Warriors had come off of the prior season as defending champions. During game 1 in Sacramento, Vallejo-based rapper E-40 was ejected after a confrontation with a Kings fan at his courtside seat. In game 2, a rough play occurred, with Draymond Green stomping on Domantas Sabonis's chest after he grabbed Green's leg, resulting in Green being suspended for game 3. Despite the Warriors experiencing numerous injuries to star players such as Draymond Green, they managed to defeat the Kings in 7 games. Stephen Curry scored 50 points in game 7, marking the first time a player scored more than 50 points in a game 7 during a playoff series. The series drew the highest first- and second-round playoff TV ratings for the NBA since 1999, with game 7 peaking at 11.9 million viewers on ABC.

The two teams met in the 2024 Play-In Tournament, where the Kings got their revenge on the Warriors 118–94 in the first game. However, they were eliminated from playoff contention by the New Orleans Pelicans in the following tournament game.

== Season-by-season results ==
Rochester/Cincinnati Royals/Kansas City-Omaha/Kansas City/Sacramento Kings vs. Philadelphia/San Francisco/Golden State Warriors Season-by-Season Results
1940s (Royals, 10–1)

Season	Season series		at Rochester Royals	at Philadelphia Warriors	Overall series	Notes
1948–49	Royals	5–0	Royals, 3–0	Royals, 2–0	Royals, 5–0	The National Basketball League (NBL) merged with the Basketball Association of America (BAA), merging the Royals and Warriors in the same league. Royals are placed in the Western Division. Royals finish with the best record in the league (45–15).
1949–50	Royals	5–1	Royals, 3–0	Royals, 2–1	Royals, 10–1	The Basketball Association of America merged with the National Basketball Association (NBA). Royals temporarily move to the Central Division.

1950s (Warriors, 43–37)

Season	Season series		at Rochester Royals/Cincinnati Royals	at Philadelphia Warriors	at Neutral Site	Overall series	Notes
1950–51	Warriors	4–2	Royals, 2–1	Warriors, 3–0		Royals, 12–5	Warriors win their first season series against the Royals. Royals move back to the Western Division. Royals win 1951 NBA Finals, their first and, so far, only NBA championship.
1951–52	Royals	4–2	Royals, 3–0	Warriors, 2–1		Royals, 16–7	Royals finish with the best record in the league (41–25).
1952–53	Royals	4–2	Royals, 3–0	Warriors, 2–1		Royals, 20–9	
1953–54	Royals	7–1	Royals, 3–1	Royals, 3–0	Royals, 1–0	Royals, 27–10	Neutral site game was played at: Cleveland Arena, Cleveland, Ohio
1954–55	Warriors	5–4	Royals, 3–0	Warriors, 1–0	Warriors, 4–1	Royals, 31–15	Neutral site games were played at: Madison Square Garden (III), New York, New York; Sports Arena, Toledo, Ohio; Buffalo Memorial Auditorium, Buffalo, New York; Convention Hall, Saratoga Springs, New York; New Haven Arena, New Haven, Connecticut
1955–56	Warriors	6–3	Tie, 2–2	Warriors, 2–1	Warriors, 2–0	Royals, 34–21	Neutral site games were played at: Madison Square Garden (III); New Haven Arena Royals open Rochester Community War Memorial (now known as Blue Cross Arena). Warriors finish with the best record in the league (45–27). Warriors win 1956 NBA Finals.
1956–57	Royals	5–4	Royals, 3–1	Tie, 1–1	Warriors, 2–1	Royals, 39–25	Neutral site games were played at: Hershey Sports Arena, Hershey, Pennsylvania; Madison Square Garden (III); Camden Convention Hall, Camden, New Jersey; Final season Royals played as a Rochester–based team.
1957–58	Royals	6–3	Tie, 2–2	Royals, 4–0	Warriors, 1–0	Royals, 45–28	Neutral site games was played at: Madison Square Garden (III); Royals relocate to Cincinnati and play at Cincinnati Gardens.
1958–59	Warriors	7–2	Warriors, 3–1	Warriors, 3–0	Tie, 1–1	Royals, 47–35	Neutral site games were played at: Madison Square Garden (III); Camden Convention Hall
1959–60	Warriors	9–0	Warriors, 4–0	Warriors, 3–0	Warriors, 2–0	Royals, 47–44	Neutral site games were played at: Madison Square Garden (III); Kiel Auditorium, St. Louis, Missouri; First series sweep for the Warriors against the Royals.

1960s (Royals, 43–41)

Season	Season series		at Cincinnati Royals	at Philadelphia/San Francisco Warriors	at Neutral Site	Overall series	Notes
1960–61	Warriors	8–2	Warriors, 3–1	Warriors, 3–0	Warriors, 2–1	Warriors, 52–49	Neutral site games were played at: Hershey Sports Arena; Boston Garden, Boston, Massachusetts; Detroit Olympia, Detroit, Michigan; Warriors take the lead in the series for the first time. Oscar Robertson makes his debut for the Royals.
1961–62	Warriors	5–3	Tie, 2–2	Warriors, 3–1		Warriors, 57–52	Last season the Warriors played as a Philadelphia team.
1962–63	Royals	6–3	Royals, 4–0	Royals, 2–1	Warriors, 2–0	Warriors, 60–58	Neutral site games were played at: Boston Garden; Oakland Civic Auditorium, Oakland, California; Warriors relocate to San Francisco and play at the Cow Palace. Warriors were moved to the Western Division while the Royals were moved to the Eastern Division.
1963–64	Royals	5–4	Warriors, 2–1	Tie, 2–2	Royals, 2–0	Warriors, 64–63	Neutral site games were played at: Madison Square Garden (III); Cleveland Arena Warriors lose 1964 NBA Finals.
1964–65	Royals	8–2	Royals, 4–1	Royals, 4–1		Royals, 71–66	Royals re-take the series lead.
1965–66	Tie	5–5	Royals, 2–1	Warriors, 2–1	Tie, 2–2	Royals, 76–71	Neutral site game were played at: Oakland Civic Auditorium; Dayton Fieldhouse, Dayton, Ohio; Ball State University Fieldhouse, Muncie, Indiana; Arizona Veterans Memorial Coliseum, Phoenix, Arizona; Rick Barry makes his debut for the Warriors.
1966–67	Royals	5–4	Tie, 2–2	Royals, 3–1	Warriors, 1–0	Royals, 81–75	Neutral site game was played at Cleveland Arena. Rick Barry leaves the Warriors at the end of the season. Warriors lose 1967 NBA Finals.
1967–68	Royals	4–3	Royals, 2–0	Warriors, 3–1	Royals, 1–0	Royals, 85–78	Neutral site game was played at Cleveland Arena.
1968–69	Tie	3–3	Tie, 1–1	Royals, 2–1	Warriors, 1–0	Royals, 88–81	Neutral site game was played at Cleveland Arena.
1969–70	Warriors	4–2	Warriors, 3–0	Royals, 2–1		Royals, 90–85	Last season Oscar Robertson played for the Royals.

1970s (Warriors, 28–21)

Season	Season series		at Cincinnati Royals/Kansas City-Omaha Kings/Kansas City Kings	at San Francisco Warriors/Golden State Warriors	at Neutral Site	Overall series	Notes
1970–71	Warriors	3–2	Warriors, 1–0	Warriors, 2–1	Royals, 1–0	Royals, 92–88	Neutral site games was played at Omaha Civic Auditorium, Omaha, Nebraska. Final season where the two teams play on a neutral site. Royals are placed in the Eastern Conference and the Central Division. Warriors are placed in the Western Conference and the Pacific Division. Last season until the 2019 season the Warriors played in San Francisco.
1971–72	Warriors	3–2	Royals, 2–1	Warriors, 2–0		Royals, 94–91	Warriors relocate across the Bay to Oakland and rename themselves to the Golden State Warriors. Final season Royals play as a Cincinnati–based team and under the name "Royals".
1972–73	Warriors	4–2	Kings, 2–1	Warriors, 3–0		Kings, 96–95	Royals relocated to Kansas City and Omaha, playing at Municipal Auditorium and Omaha Civic Auditorium respectively, and changed their name to the Kansas City–Omaha Kings. Kings are placed in the Western Conference and the Midwest Division. Rick Barry returns to the Warriors.
1973–74	Tie	3–3	Kings, 2–1	Warriors, 2–1		Kings, 99–98	
1974–75	Tie	2–2	Kings, 2–0	Warriors, 2–0		Kings, 101–100	Kings open Kemper Arena (now known as Hy-Vee Arena). Kings record their 100th win over the Warriors, and Warriors record their 100th win over the Royals/Kings. Warriors win the 1975 NBA Finals.
1975–76	Warriors	4–1	Warriors, 2–1	Warriors, 2–0		Warriors, 104–102	Kings shorten their name to the Kansas City Kings. Warriors finish with the best record in the league (59–23). Warriors re-take the overall lead.
1976–77	Kings	3–1	Kings, 2–0	Tie, 1–1		Tie, 105–105	
1977–78	Warriors	3–1	Warriors, 2–0	Tie, 1–1		Warriors, 108–106	Last season Rick Barry played for the Warriors.
1978–79	Tie	2–2	Tie, 1–1	Tie, 1–1		Warriors, 110–108	Kings fully play their home games in Kansas City.
1979–80	Tie	3–3	Kings, 2–1	Warriors, 2–1		Warriors, 113–111	Due to a June 1979 storm that caused the collapse of Kemper Arena's roof, the Kings played a majority of their home games at Municipal Auditorium.

1980s (Warriors, 28–22)

Season	Season series		at Kansas City Kings/Sacramento Kings	at Golden State Warriors	Overall series	Notes
1980–81	Warriors	5–0	Warriors, 3–0	Warriors, 2–0	Warriors, 118–111	
1981–82	Warriors	3–2	Tie, 1–1	Warriors, 2–1	Warriors, 121–113	
1982–83	Kings	4–1	Kings, 2–1	Kings, 2–0	Warriors, 122–117	
1983–84	Kings	4–1	Tie, 1–1	Warriors, 3–0	Warriors, 126–118	
1984–85	Kings	3–2	Kings, 3–0	Warriors, 2–0	Warriors, 128–121	Final season Kings played as a Kansas City–based team.
1985–86	Kings	3–2	Kings, 2–0	Warriors, 2–1	Warriors, 130–124	Kings relocate to Sacramento, becoming an in-state rival for the Warriors, and open ARCO Arena I.
1986–87	Warriors	4–1	Warriors, 2–1	Warriors, 2–0	Warriors, 134–125	
1987–88	Kings	3–2	Kings, 2–0	Warriors, 2–1	Warriors, 136–128	
1988–89	Kings	3–2	Kings, 2–1	Tied, 1–1	Warriors, 138–131	Kings are moved to the Pacific Division, becoming divisional rivals with the Warriors. Kings open ARCO Arena.
1989–90	Warriors	3–2	Tied, 1–1	Warriors, 2–1	Warriors, 141–133	

1990s (Kings, 23–21)

Season	Season series		at Sacramento Kings	at Golden State Warriors	Overall series	Notes
1990–91	Kings	3–2	Kings, 3–0	Warriors, 2–0	Warriors, 143–136	
1991–92	Warriors	5–0	Warriors, 2–0	Warriors, 3–0	Warriors, 148–136	
1992–93	Warriors	4–1	Warriors, 3–0	Tie, 1–1	Warriors, 152–137	
1993–94	Warriors	4–1	Tie, 1–1	Warriors, 3–0	Warriors, 156–138	
1994–95	Kings	5–0	Kings, 3–0	Kings, 2–0	Warriors, 156–143	
1995–96	Kings	3–1	Kings, 2–0	Tie, 1–1	Warriors, 157–146	
1996–97	Kings	3–1	Kings, 2–0	Tie, 1–1	Warriors, 158–149	
1997–98	Tie	2–2	Tie, 1–1	Tie, 1–1	Warriors, 160–151	
1998–99	Kings	2–1	Kings, 1–0	Tie, 1–1	Warriors, 161–153	
1999–2000	Kings	3–1	Kings, 2–0	Tie, 1–1	Warriors, 162–156	

2000s (Kings, 23–17)

Season	Season series		at Sacramento Kings	at Golden State Warriors	Overall series	Notes
2000–01	Kings	4–0	Kings, 2–0	Kings, 2–0	Warriors, 162–160	
2001–02	Kings	4–0	Kings, 2–0	Kings, 2–0	Kings, 164–162	Kings finish with the best record in the league (61–21). Kings re-take the overall lead once more.
2002–03	Kings	4–0	Kings, 2–0	Kings, 2–0	Kings, 168–162	
2003–04	Tie	2–2	Kings, 2–0	Warriors, 2–0	Kings, 170–164	Kings won 15 in a row against the Warriors (2000-2003).
2004–05	Warriors	3–1	Warriors, 2–0	Tie, 1–1	Kings, 171–167	
2005–06	Tie	2–2	Tie, 1–1	Tie, 1–1	Kings, 173–169	
2006–07	Warriors	3–1	Tie, 1–1	Warriors, 2–0	Kings, 174–172	Last time the Kings held the overall lead over the Warriors.
2007–08	Warriors	3–1	Tie, 1–1	Warriors, 2–0	Tie, 175–175	
2008–09	Tie	2–2	Tie, 1–1	Tie, 1–1	Tie, 177–177	
2009–10	Tie	2–2	Kings, 2–0	Warriors, 2–0	Tie, 179–179	Stephen Curry makes his debut for the Warriors.

2010s (Warriors, 27–12)

Season	Season series		at Sacramento Kings	at Golden State Warriors	Overall series	Notes
2010–11	Tie	2–2	Tie, 1–1	Tie, 1–1	Tie, 181–181	
2011–12	Warriors	3–1	Tie, 1–1	Warriors, 2–0	Warriors, 184–182	
2012–13	Kings	3–1	Kings, 2–0	Tie, 1–1	Tie, 185–185	
2013–14	Warriors	4–0	Warriors, 2–0	Warriors, 2–0	Warriors, 189–185	Warriors take the overall lead after continuous changes and ties.
2014–15	Warriors	4–0	Warriors, 2–0	Warriors, 2–0	Warriors, 193–185	Warriors finish with the best record in the league (67–15). Warriors win the 2015 NBA Finals.
2015–16	Warriors	4–0	Warriors, 2–0	Warriors, 2–0	Warriors, 197–185	Last season Kings played at Sleep Train Arena (now known as ARCO Arena). Warriors finish with the best record in the league (73–9), setting an NBA record for most wins in an NBA season. Warriors lose the 2016 NBA Finals.
2016–17	Warriors	3–1	Tie, 1–1	Warriors, 2–0	Warriors, 200–186	Kings open Golden 1 Center. Warriors record their 200th win over the Kings. Warriors win 13 in a row against the Kings (2013-2017). Warriors finish with the best record in the league (67–15). Warriors win the 2017 NBA Finals.
2017–18	Tie	2–2	Warriors, 2–0	Kings, 2–0	Warriors, 202–188	Warriors win the 2018 NBA Finals.
2018–19	Warriors	4–0	Warriors, 2–0	Warriors, 2–0	Warriors, 206–188	Last season Warriors played in Oakland. Warriors lose the 2019 NBA Finals.
2019–20	Kings	3–0	Kings, 1–0	Kings, 2–0	Warriors, 206–191	Warriors relocate back to San Francisco and open up the Chase Center. Due to the COVID-19 pandemic suspending the season, their remaining game at Sacramento was canceled.

2020s (Warriors, 19–12)

Season	Season series		at Sacramento Kings	at Golden State Warriors	Overall series	Notes
2020–21	Warriors	2–1	Kings, 1–0	Warriors, 2–0	Warriors, 208–192	
2021–22	Warriors	4–0	Warriors, 2–0	Warriors, 2–0	Warriors, 212–192	Warriors win the 2022 NBA Finals.
2022–23	Warriors	3–1	Tie, 1–1	Warriors, 2–0	Warriors, 215–193	Kings win their first Chuck Cooper Trophy and their first divisional title since 2002 season.
2023 Western Conference First Round	Warriors	4–3	Tie, 2–2	Warriors, 2–1	Warriors, 219–196	1st postseason series. Stephen Curry became the first player to score 50 points in a Game 7.
2023–24	Tie	2–2	Tie, 1–1	Tie, 1–1	Warriors, 221–198	On November 28, 2023, at Sacramento, the Kings beat the Warriors 124–123 during the 2023 NBA In-Season Tournament group stage.
2024 NBA play-in tournament	Kings	1–0	Kings; 118–194	N/A	Warriors, 221–199	1st play-in matchup. Warriors were eliminated as a result of losing this match, while the Kings were subsequently eliminated by the New Orleans Pelicans.
2024–25	Tie	2–2	Tie, 1–1	Tie, 1–1	Warriors, 223–201	Kings record their 200th win over the Warriors. Stephen Curry reaches 4,000 three-pointers made on March 13, 2025.
2025–26	Tie	2–2	Kings, 2–0	Warriors, 2–0	Warriors, 225–203	
2026–27	Tie	0-0	March 10th and April 4th, 2027	November 25th, 2026 and January 12th, 2027	Warriors, 225–203	The game on November 25 at San Francisco is a 2026 NBA Cup group stage game.

Summary of Results

Season	Season series		at Rochester/Cincinnati Royals Kansas City-Omaha/Kansas City/Sacramento Kings	at Philadelphia/San Francisco/Golden State Warriors	at Neutral Site	Notes
Regular season games	Warriors	221–199	Kings, 118–79	Warriors, 122–70	Warriors, 20–11	
Postseason games	Warriors	4–3	Tie, 2–2	Warriors, 2–1		
Postseason series	Warriors	1–0	Warriors, 1–0			Western Conference First Round: 2023
NBA play-in tournament	Kings	1–0	Kings, 1–0			2024
Regular, postseason and play-in	Warriors	225–203	Kings, 120–82	Warriors, 123–72	Warriors, 20–11	There were 31 total neutral site games played.: 7 games at Madison Square Garden (III); 5 games at Cleveland Arena; 2 games at Boston Garden, New Haven Arena, Camden Convention Hall, Oakland Civic Auditorium and Hershey Sports Arena; 1 game at Buffalo Memorial Auditorium, Convention Hall, Ball State University Fieldhouse, Arizona Veterans Memorial Coliseum, Omaha Civic Auditorium, Dayton Fieldhouse, Detroit Olympia, Sports Arena and Kiel Auditorium

== See also ==
- List of National Basketball Association rivalries
- Bay Bridge Series
- 49ers–Raiders rivalry
- The Big Game
