= Bay Bridge Series =

Baseball series in San Francisco Bay, US

- Oakland Athletics San Francisco Giants
- Location: San Francisco Bay Area
- First meeting: 1989 World Series: October 14, 1989; Oakland–Alameda County Coliseum, Oakland, California; Athletics 5, Giants 0 Regular season: July 2, 1997; 3Com Park, San Francisco, California; Athletics 8, Giants 1
- Latest meeting: August 18, 2024; Oakland–Alameda County Coliseum, Oakland, California; Giants 4, Athletics 2
- Stadiums: Athletics: Oakland–Alameda County Coliseum; Giants: Oracle Park
- Trophy: Giants 4 Athletics 3

Statistics
- Total meetings: 152
- All-time series: Athletics, 80–72 (.526)
- Regular season series: Athletics, 76–72 (.514)
- Postseason results: Athletics, 4–0 (1.000)
- Largest victory: Athletics, 16–0 (June 26, 2005); Giants, 18–2 (June 4, 2000)
- Longest win streak: Athletics, 7 (June 8, 2007–June 27, 2008); Giants, 6 (June 11, 2010–May 22, 2011)
- Current win streak: Giants, 1

Post-season history
- 1989 World Series: Athletics won, 4–0

Locations of the Oakland Athletics and San Francisco Giants

The Athletics–Giants rivalry, formerly termed the Bay Bridge Series, or the Battle of the Bay, was a series of baseball games played between—and the rivalry of—Major League Baseball's Oakland Athletics of the American League and San Francisco Giants of the National League. The formerly termed Bay Bridge Series took its name from the San Francisco–Oakland Bay Bridge which links the cities of Oakland and San Francisco. Beginning in 2018, the winner of the annual series retained a trophy fashioned from a piece of the original bridge.

Although competitive, the regional rivalry between the A's and Giants is considered a friendly one with mostly mutual companionship between the fans, as opposed to Cubs–White Sox, or Mets–Yankees games where animosity runs high, though sections of each fanbase does harbor towards the entirety of the other. This, however, is limited as many people see the opposing team as no threat to their own; hats displaying both teams on the cap are sold from vendors at the games, and once in a while the teams both dress in uniforms from a historic era of their franchises. Many fans actively cheer for both teams when they are not playing against the other. A's fans cite the Giants blocking a potential move to San Jose as a point of contention.

The series was also occasionally referred to as the "BART Series" for the Bay Area Rapid Transit system that links Oakland to San Francisco. However, the name "BART Series" has never been popular beyond a small selection of history books and national broadcasters and has fallen out of favor, likely because BART does not provide direct or easy access to Oracle Park in San Francisco. Bay Area locals almost exclusively referred to the rivalry as the "Bay Bridge Series" or the "Battle of the Bay."

Originally, the term described a series of exhibition games played between the two clubs after the conclusion of spring training, immediately prior to the start of the regular season. It was first used to refer to the 1989 World Series which the Athletics won and the first time both teams had met since they moved to the San Francisco Bay Area. Later it also referred to games played between the teams during the regular season since the commencement of Interleague play in 1997. Through the 2024 season and conclusion of the rivalry, the Athletics won 76 games, and the Giants won 72. The Bay Bridge Series ended when the Athletics made West Sacramento, California their temporary home starting in the 2025 season until their new stadium is completed in Las Vegas, Nevada. While the Athletics play in West Sacramento, the series has been called the "I-80 Series."

== History prior to Bay Area move ==
The Giants and Athletics met in the 1905, 1911, and 1913 World Series as the New York Giants and Philadelphia Athletics. The Giants won, 4–1, in 1905, and the Athletics won in 1911 (4–1) and 1913 (4–2), respectively. Overall, the Athletics won more games, 9–7. Hall of Famers such as John McGraw, Roger Bresnahan, Christy Mathewson, Joe McGinnity and Rube Marquard took part on the Giants side while the Athletics had Connie Mack, Chief Bender, Eddie Plank, Rube Waddell, Frank Baker and Eddie Collins.

== The Move to the Bay ==
=== 1989 World Series ===
The San Francisco Giants and Oakland Athletics met for the first time in the 1989 World Series. This series was interrupted minutes before Game 3 on October 17, 1989, when an earthquake, measuring 6.9 on the Richter Scale, struck the San Francisco Bay Area. The resulting damage to both Candlestick Park and to a lesser extent the Oakland Coliseum, along with the emotional and economic damage to the area, delayed the resumption of the series for 10 days, the longest interval between games in World Series history. The earthquake caused the collapse of a portion of the Bay Bridge, the centerpiece of many promotions for the "Bay Bridge Series"; however, experts have suggested that the Series actually helped to save countless lives, as many would-be commuters from both sides of the Bay had left work early or stayed in the cities to watch the game. As a result, traffic on the roads below collapsed portions of the Bay Bridge and Cypress Street Viaduct portion of Interstate 880 in Oakland (while this disaster killed one person on the Bay Bridge and 42 people on the viaduct, local officials initially assumed that the death toll would be well into the hundreds) was significantly lighter than it would normally be at rush hour.

The Athletics swept the Giants to win the 1989 World Series.

=== Interleague play ===
Both teams met for the first time in the regular season in June 1997.

The Giants' Barry Zito started 0–4 against his former team, finally beating the Athletics on June 12, 2010 at AT&T Park.

== Athletics San Jose relocation controversy (aka The Bay Blackjack Series) ==
The A's had considered relocating to San Jose, California, for several years but had reportedly met with resistance from the Giants. San Jose is located in Santa Clara County, which is considered to be the Giants "territory". The Athletics claimed that former owner Walter A. Haas Jr. agreed for the Giants to take over the Santa Clara area when the Giants were considering moving to Florida and needed revenue. The Giants contended that the agreement was not based upon actually relocating the team to Santa Clara as the A's contended. Former MLB commissioner Bud Selig, who was fraternity brothers with A's managing partner Lew Wolff at the University of Wisconsin, stated that the A's would not be able to survive as a franchise if they remained at the Oakland Coliseum. The Giants claimed that the territorial rights were "explicitly reaffirmed by Major League Baseball on four separate occasions," when former managing partner Peter Magowan bought the team in the early 1990s. The Giants stated "upon purchasing the team 20 years ago, our plan to revive the franchise relied heavily on targeting and solidifying our fan base in the largest and fastest growing county within our territory. Based on these Constitutionally-recognized territorial rights, the Giants invested hundreds of millions of dollars to save and stabilize the team for the Bay Area, built Oracle Park privately and has operated the franchise so that it can compete at the highest levels."

== Future ==
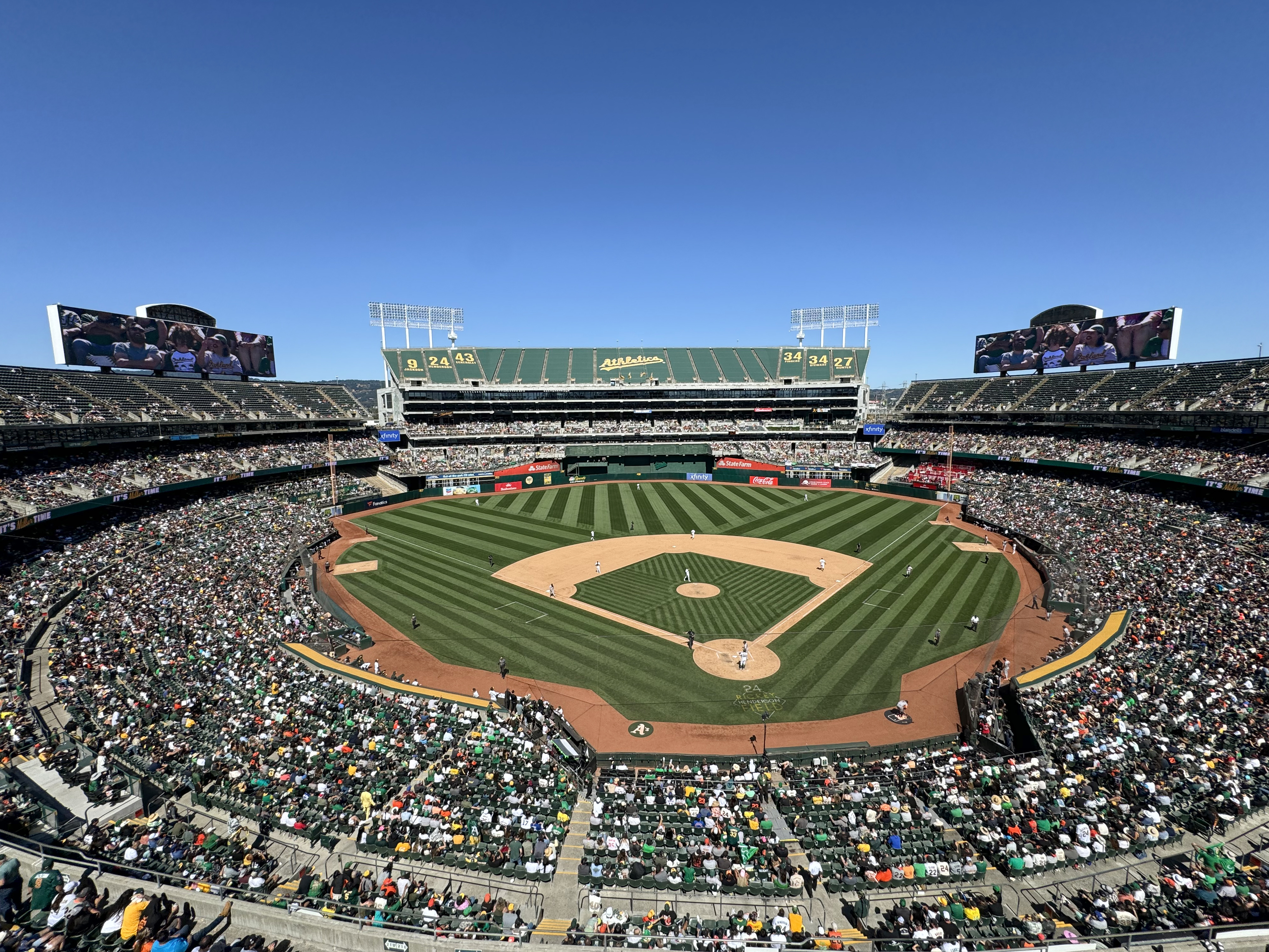
The final Battle of the Bay at the Oakland Coliseum on August 18, 2024

With the A's leaving Oakland after the 2024 season for Las Vegas in 2028 (and West Sacramento in the interim), due to over a decade of failing to replace the outdated and crumbling Oakland Coliseum with a more modern facility, the rivalry in the form of the Bay Bridge series and Bay Area series effectively ended in 2024 (the final Bay Bridge Series game took place on August 18, 2024 with the Giants winning 4–2). Instead of being focused on the Bay Area, the rivalry will continue as one over Northern California. When the team does move to Las Vegas as planned, however, the teams may still meet in 6 games annually due to the other West division teams being paired up in Interleague rivalries (barring a swap of the forced pairings). Even still, the teams would at least still meet in an annual 3-game series with alternating venues each season.

After plans for Cisco Field were shuttered due to the Giants blocking the plan with the decision upheld by the United States Supreme Court, the A's attempted to build their new waterfront stadium. With John Fisher not willing to come into an agreement with the City of Oakland, the A's instead purchased land near Allegiant Stadium, home of the Las Vegas Raiders (who also formerly played in Oakland) and T-Mobile Arena, home of the Vegas Golden Knights in April 2023. The plans later shifted to a new stadium built on the Tropicana Las Vegas and were approved by the Nevada State Legislature and Nevada Governor Joe Lombardo by June.

Despite the rivalry, following the Athletics plans for relocation, Athletics and Giants fans during a July 25, 2023 game at Oracle Park chanted "Sell the Team" as part of an event known as "Unite the Bay" in the hopes that the rivalry would be saved. During the final Bay Bridge Series game, Giants and Athletics players both made emotional speeches and took souvenirs from the Oakland Coliseum.

On April 2, 2025, a minor league version of the rivalry was started, referred to as the Battle of the Bay 2.0: the San Jose Giants, the Single-A affiliate of the San Francisco Giants, played an exhibition game against the unaffiliated Oakland Ballers (also known as the Oakland B's) of the Pioneer League. The game was the first time in history an MLB affiliated minor league team played against an independent partner league team. The game was broadcast on KPIX+, and the San Jose Giants won the game 5–2, and both teams vowed to renew the exhibition for the next year.

== Club success ==
Team	World Series Titles	League pennants	Division titles	Wild Card Berths	Playoff Appearances	World Series Appearances	All-time Regular Season record	Win percentage	Seasons played
Oakland Athletics	4	6	17	4	21	6	4,614–4,387–1	.513	57
San Francisco Giants	3	6	9	3	13	6	5,474–5,121–6	.517	67
Combined	7	12	26	7	34	12	10,088–9,508–7	.515	67 in SF Bay 124 total

Note: Giants records only from 1958 when they moved to San Francisco, as are Athletics records from 1968 when they moved to Oakland through their last season in Oakland in 2024.
As of September 30, 2024.

=== Results ===
OAK vs. SF	Athletics wins	Giants wins	Athletics runs	Giants runs
Regular season	76	72	649	631
World Series	4	0	32	14
Total	80	72	681	645

Updated to most recent meeting, August 18, 2024.

== Season-by-season results ==
Athletics vs. Giants Season-by-Season Results
1900s (Giants, 4–1)

Season	Season series		at Philadelphia Athletics	at New York Giants	Overall series	Notes
1905 World Series	Giants	4‍–‍1	Giants, 2‍–‍0	Giants, 2‍–‍1	Giants; 4‍–‍1	Losing team was shut out in all games. The first steal of home during the World Series occurred during the fifth inning of Game 3, by New York's Bill Dahlen.

1910s (Athletics, 8–3)

Season	Season series		at Philadelphia Athletics	at New York Giants	Overall series	Notes
1911 World Series	Athletics	4‍–‍2	Athletics, 3‍–‍0	Giants, 2‍–‍1	Giants; 6‍–‍5	First World Series to feature two teams that had previously won a title. The six consecutive days of rain between Games 3 and 4 caused the longest delay between World Series games until the earthquake-interrupted 1989 World Series (which incidentally featured the same two franchises, albeit on the West Coast).
1913 World Series	Athletics	4‍–‍1	Tie, 1‍–‍1	Athletics, 3‍–‍0	Athletics; 9‍–‍7	Last matchup to feature the Athletics as a Philadelphia team and the Giants as a New York team.

1980s (Athletics, 4–0)

Season	Season series		at Oakland Athletics	at San Francisco Giants	Overall series	Notes
1989 World Series	Athletics	4‍–‍0	Athletics, 2‍–‍0	Athletics, 2‍–‍0	Athletics; 13‍–‍7	<thletics move to Oakland in the 1968 season and Giants move to San Francisco in the 1958 season. First time two franchises had faced off in the World Series after having once played each other when both were based in a different city. The 76-year gap between matchups was the longest in World Series history until the 102-year gap 2018 Red Sox–Dodgers matchup. An earthquake caused Game 3 to be delayed for 10 days, marking a 12 day gap between Game 2 and Game 3. Game 3 set a record for most combined HRs hit in a World Series game (7) until it was broken in Game 2 of the 2017 World Series. Dave Stewart wins the MVP award.

1990s (Tie, 7–7)

Season	Season series		at Oakland Athletics	at San Francisco Giants	Overall series	Notes
1997	Tie	2‍–‍2	Tie, 1‍–‍1	Tie, 1‍–‍1	Athletics; 15‍–‍9	Interleague play was introduced in the 1997 season, marking the first time the Athletics and Giants played each other in the regular season. Athletics win 8 games in a row against the Giants dating back to the 1913 World Series.
1998	Tie	2‍–‍2	Giants, 2‍–‍0	Athletics, 2‍–‍0	Athletics; 17‍–‍11	First time road team sweeps the season series.
1999	Tie	3‍–‍3	Athletics, 2‍–‍1	Giants, 2‍–‍1	Athletics; 20‍–‍14	First year of 6-game home-and-away format. Last season Giants played at 3Com Park (previously known as Candlestick Park).

2000s (Athletics, 32–28)

Season	Season series		at Oakland Athletics	at San Francisco Giants	Overall series	Notes
2000	Tie	3‍–‍3	Athletics, 2‍–‍1	Giants, 2‍–‍1	Athletics; 23‍–‍17	Giants open up Pacific Bell Park (now known as Oracle Park). On June 4 at Network Associates Coliseum, Giants beat the Athletics 18‍–‍2, their largest victory against the Athletics with a 16-point differential and their most runs scored in a game against the Athletics. Both teams qualify for the playoffs for first time since 1989. Giants finish with the best record in the league (97‍–‍65).
2001	Giants	4‍–‍2	Athletics, 2‍–‍1	Giants, 3‍–‍0	Athletics; 25‍–‍21	First time in which a regular season series does not end in a tie.
2002	Athletics	4‍–‍2	Athletics, 2‍–‍1	Athletics, 2‍–‍1	Athletics; 29‍–‍23	Both teams qualify for the playoffs. Athletics finished tied for the best record in the league (103‍–‍59). Giants lose 2002 World Series.
2003	Tie	3‍–‍3	Athletics, 2‍–‍1	Giants, 2‍–‍1	Athletics; 32‍–‍26	
2004	Tie	3‍–‍3	Giants, 2‍–‍1	Athletics, 2‍–‍1	Athletics; 35‍–‍29	
2005	Athletics	4‍–‍2	Athletics, 3‍–‍0	Giants, 2‍–‍1	Athletics; 39‍–‍31	On June 26 at McAfee Coliseum, Athletics beat the Giants 16‍–‍0, their largest victory against the Giants with a 16-run differential and their most runs scored in a game against the Giants.
2006	Tie	3‍–‍3	Giants, 2‍–‍1	Athletics, 2‍–‍1	Athletics; 42‍–‍34	
2007	Athletics	5‍–‍1	Athletics, 2‍–‍1	Athletics, 3‍–‍0	Athletics; 47‍–‍35	
2008	Athletics	4‍–‍2	Giants, 2‍–‍1	Athletics, 3‍–‍0	Athletics; 51‍–‍37	Athletics win 7 games in a row against the Giants.
2009	Giants	5‍–‍1	Giants, 2‍–‍1	Giants, 3‍–‍0	Athletics; 52‍–‍42	

2010s (Tie, 25–25)

Season	Season series		at Oakland Athletics	at San Francisco Giants	Overall series	Notes
2010	Tie	3‍–‍3	Athletics, 3‍–‍0	Giants, 3‍–‍0	Athletics; 55‍–‍45	Home team sweeps the season series. Giants win 2010 World Series.
2011	Tie	3‍–‍3	Athletics, 3‍–‍0	Giants, 3‍–‍0	Athletics; 58‍–‍48	
2012	Giants	4‍–‍2	Giants, 2‍–‍1	Giants, 2‍–‍1	Athletics; 60‍–‍52	Giants win 11 straight home meetings. Both teams win their divisions and finish with the same record (94‍–‍68). Giants win 2012 World Series.
2013	Athletics	3‍–‍1	Athletics, 2‍–‍0	Tie, 1‍–‍1	Athletics; 63‍–‍53	Series changed to four-game format with two in each city, except in years the AL West plays the NL West (2015, 2018, 2020, & 2021).
2014	Athletics	3‍–‍1	Athletics, 2‍–‍0	Tie, 1‍–‍1	Athletics; 66‍–‍54	Both teams qualify for playoffs. Giants win 2014 World Series.
2015	Giants	5‍–‍1	Giants, 2‍–‍1	Giants, 3‍–‍0	Athletics; 67‍–‍59	
2016	Athletics	3‍–‍1	Tie, 1‍–‍1	Athletics, 2‍–‍0	Athletics; 70‍–‍60	
2017	Tie	2‍–‍2	Tie, 1‍–‍1	Tie, 1‍–‍1	Athletics; 72‍–‍62	
2018	Athletics	4‍–‍2	Athletics, 2‍–‍1	Athletics, 2‍–‍1	Athletics; 76‍–‍64	Athletics win inaugural Bay Bridge Trophy.
2019	Giants	3‍–‍1	Giants, 2‍–‍0	Tie, 1‍–‍1	Athletics; 77‍–‍67	Giants win Bay Bridge Trophy.

2020s (Giants, 21–15)

Season	Season series		at (Oakland) Athletics	at San Francisco Giants	Overall series	Notes
2020	Athletics	5‍–‍1	Athletics, 2‍–‍1	Athletics, 3‍–‍0	Athletics; 82‍–‍68	Due to COVID-19 pandemic, the season is shortened to 60 games, and each division plays its interleague counterpart for 20 games, which is why both teams play three times in each city instead of two. Athletics reclaim the Bay Bridge Trophy.
2021	Giants	4‍–‍2	Giants, 2‍–‍1	Giants, 2‍–‍1	Athletics; 84‍–‍72	On August 21 and 22, the Giants made history by becoming the first MLB team to hit lead-changing pinch-hit home runs in the eighth inning or later in back-to-back games. Giants win Bay Bridge Trophy. Giants finish with the best record in the league (107–55).
2022	Giants	3‍–‍1	Giants, 2‍–‍0	Tie, 1‍–‍1	Athletics; 85‍–‍75	Giants win Bay Bridge Trophy.
2023	Tie	2‍–‍2	Athletics, 2‍–‍0	Giants, 2‍–‍0	Athletics; 87‍–‍77	
2024	Tie	2‍–‍2	Tie, 1‍–‍1	Tie, 1‍–‍1	Athletics; 89‍–‍79	
2025	Giants	5‍–‍1	Giants, 2‍–‍1	Giants, 3‍–‍0	Athletics; 90‍–‍84	Athletics temporarily move to West Sacramento, California and drop their location moniker. Return of six-game format with each team hosting a three-game weekend series.
2026	Giants	4‍–‍2	Giants, 2‍–‍1	Giants, 2‍–‍1	Athletics; 92‍–‍88	

Summary of Results

Season	Season series		at Athletics	at Giants	Notes
Philadelphia Athletics vs. New York Giants	Athletics	9‍–‍7	Athletics, 4‍–‍3	Athletics, 5‍–‍4	
Oakland Athletics vs. San Francisco Giants	Athletics	80‍–‍72	Athletics, 44‍–‍32	Giants, 40‍–‍36	
Athletics vs. San Francisco Giants	Giants	9‍–‍3	Giants, 4‍–‍2	Giants, 5‍–‍1	Athletics in West Sacramento, California
Regular season	Giants	81‍–‍79	Athletics, 44‍–‍36	Giants, 42‍–‍35	
Postseason Games	Athletics	13‍–‍7	Athletics, 6‍–‍3	Athletics, 7‍–‍4	
Postseason Series	Athletics	3‍–‍1	n/a	n/a	World Series: 1905, 1911, 1913, 1989
Overall Regular and postseason	Athletics	92‍–‍88	Athletics, 50‍–‍39	Giants, 49‍–‍42	

== See also ==
- Major League Baseball rivalries
- 49ers–Raiders rivalry, the defunct series between the 49ers and Raiders who were both based in the Bay area from 1960–1981 and 1995–2019)
- Kings–Warriors rivalry, the series between the two NBA teams in Northern California.
- Pearson Cup, the defunct inter-league rivalry series between the Toronto Blue Jays of the American League and Montreal Expos of the National League respectively which lasted from 1978 to 2004 when the Expos relocated to Washington D.C during the 2005 off season and were rebranded as the Washington Nationals.
