= 49ers–Raiders rivalry =

National Football League rivalry

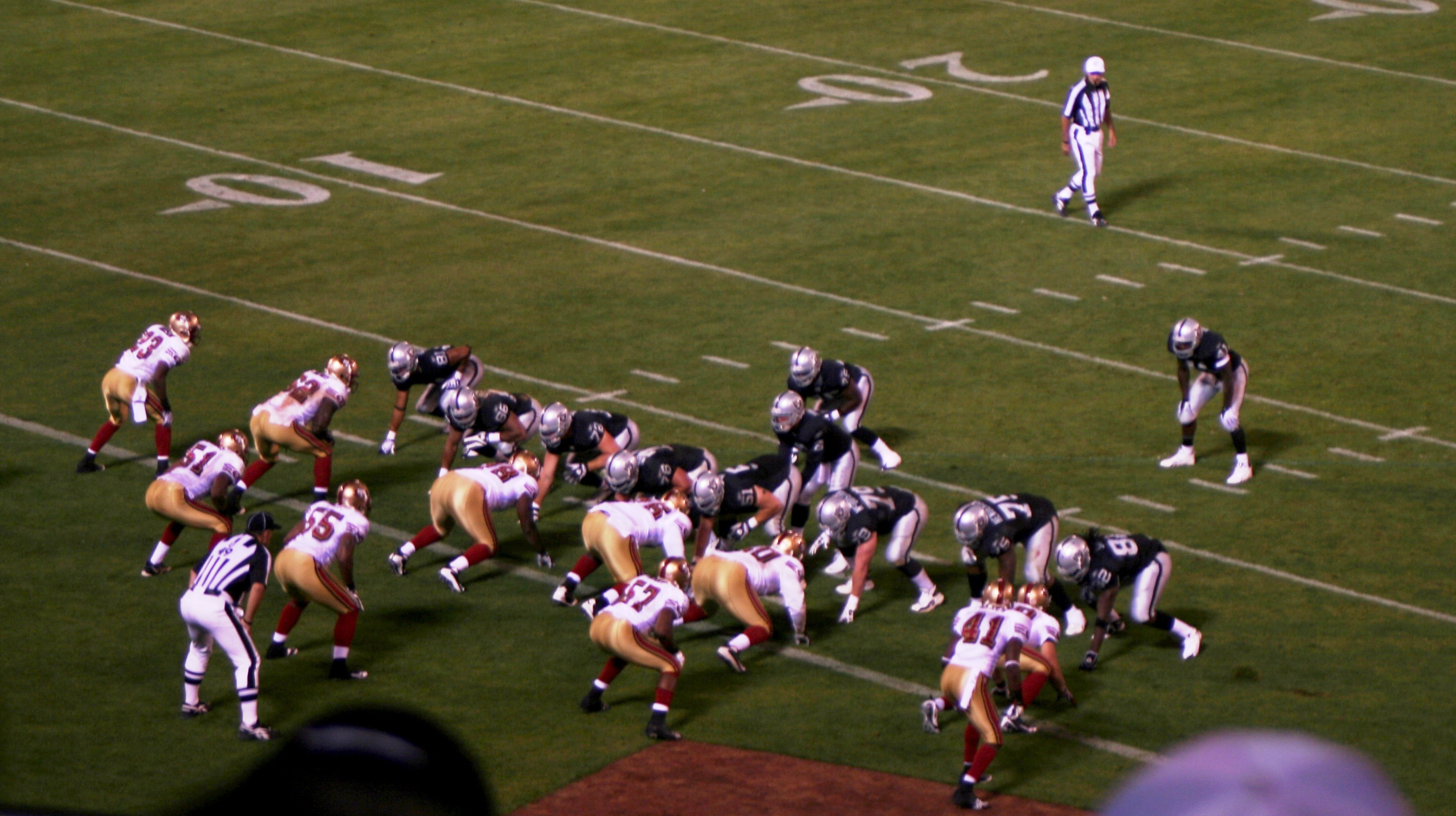
- The Raiders offense lining up against the 49ers in their 2008 preseason game

- San Francisco 49ers Las Vegas Raiders
- Location: San Francisco, Las Vegas
- First meeting: December 20, 1970; 49ers 38, Raiders 7
- Latest meeting: November 8, 2026; 49ers 38, Raiders 17
- Next meeting: TBD
- Stadiums: 49ers: Levi's Stadium; Raiders: Allegiant Stadium

Statistics
- Total meetings: 16
- All-time series: 49ers: 9–7
- Largest victory: 49ers: 38–7 (1970), 34–3 (2018); Raiders: 23–10 (1979)
- Most points scored: 49ers: 44 (1994); Raiders: 35 (1974)
- Longest win streak: 49ers: 3 (2002–10, 2018–present); Raiders: 3 (1974–82)
- Current win streak: 49ers: 3 (2018–present)^{1} The Raiders played in Oakland from 1960 to 1981 and from 1995 to 2019.^{2} The Raiders played in Los Angeles from 1982 to 1994.

The 49ers–Raiders rivalry, once commonly known as the Battle of the Bay, is a professional American football rivalry between the National Football League (NFL)'s San Francisco 49ers and Las Vegas Raiders. This rivalry is unique in that both teams are members of different conferences within the NFL and have never met in a postseason game. The rivalry stems from the proximity of Oakland and San Francisco in the northern Bay Area, and was formalised the first time the teams met after the AFL–NFL merger in the 1970 season. The geographic aspect of the rivalry ended in 2020, when the Oakland Raiders relocated to Las Vegas, Nevada.

Currently, the 49ers are in the NFC West division, while the Las Vegas Raiders are in the AFC West division. As a result, the two teams only meet in the regular season once every four years and once every eight seasons at each team's home stadium according to the NFL's current scheduling formula, with the only exception being the possibility of both teams sharing a divisional standing using the 17th game from schedules two years earlier, in which case they could play as frequently as every other year.

The only way the two teams can currently play each other in the postseason is in the Super Bowl.

== History ==
=== 1970s ===
Teams of the former American Football League were merged into the National Football League in 1970, setting up the first ever matchup between the 49ers and Raiders. Heading into the season finale, the 49ers (9–3–1) needed a win over the Raiders (8–3–2) to clinch the NFC West. On December 20, 1970, the Raiders were blown out by the 49ers 38–7 at Oakland Coliseum, as John Brodie threw for three touchdowns and Jimmy Johnson picked off Daryle Lamonica for a touchdown. Regardless, both teams managed to advance to (and lose) their respective conference championships.

In the earlier half of the 1970s, both teams were consistent performers, the Raiders becoming known as a hard-hitting, fierce team while the 49ers consistently dominated the NFC West. However, although the Oakland Raiders continued to improve, consistently clinching spots in the AFC championship, the 49ers began to regress. This disparity showed when the two teams met again on October 27, 1974, where the Raiders beat the 49ers 35–24 at Candlestick Park in a showoff between Ken Stabler and Tom Owen. The Niners turned over the football five times.

The John Madden-led Raiders continued a streak of excellence during the latter half of the 1970s, with the Raiders winning Super Bowl XI in 1976. Meanwhile, the 49ers struggled to finish seasons with a winning record, going through a coaching carousel of Dick Nolan, Monte Clark, Ken Meyer, and Pete McCulley.

In 1979, both teams acquired new head coaches, with Bill Walsh taking over for the 49ers and Tom Flores replacing John Madden for the Raiders. On November 4, 1979, the Raiders beat the 49ers 23–10, with Cliff Branch hauling in two touchdowns from Ken Stabler.

=== 1980s ===
Although the Walsh-led Niners suffered losing seasons in 1979 and 1980 and the Raiders won Super Bowl XV in 1980 as the first wild-card team to win the Super Bowl, their fortunes were about to change. In 1980, Raiders owner Al Davis's failure to get luxury boxes added to the Oakland-Alameda County Coliseum resulted in a hard-fought legal battle that made 1981 the Raiders' last year in Oakland. That same year, the 49ers with Montana under center led a dramatic comeback in the NFC championship to earn their first ever Super Bowl appearance, which they won against the Cincinnati Bengals.

In 1982, the defending Super Bowl champion 49ers floundered, losing all of their home games, including the first game of the season against the newly minted Los Angeles Raiders, which the Raiders won on the back of Marcus Allen, who rushed for 116 yards.

Two years later, in 1984, the Niners had one of the most phenomenal seasons in NFL history, finishing the regular season 15–1–0, a feat that has only been repeated or exceeded five times. The Raiders were stifled in the wild card round by the Seattle Seahawks, and the 49ers won Super Bowl XIX against Dan Marino's Miami Dolphins.

The Raiders and Niners met again on September 22, 1985, with San Francisco's defense obliterating the Raider offense, with Jim Plunkett tasting turf nine times, resulting in a 34–10 blowout of the Raiders at the Los Angeles Coliseum.

The Niners began the season struggling in 1988, with Joe Montana and Steve Young competing for the starting job after a poor performance by the former in 1987. In their match against the Raiders on November 13, 1988, they were defeated 9–3, with Montana sacked four times (with the help of Reggie McKenzie, who is the Raiders' general manager as of 2017). The 49ers turned their season around and won Super Bowl XXIII against the Cincinnati Bengals 20–16. San Francisco repeated their Super Bowl championship the next season, trampling the Denver Broncos 55–10.

In the meantime, Al Davis began negotiations to return the Raiders to Oakland.

=== 1990s ===
In March 1991, Davis announced that he was moving the Raiders back to Oakland, but Los Angeles reached a deal with him to keep the Raiders at the Coliseum later in the year. On September 29, 1991, the 49ers met the Raiders again in Los Angeles, with the Raiders winning 12–6 against a touchdown-less Steve Young San Francisco offense.

The season opener of 1994 at Candlestick Park was the next iteration in the rivalry, with the 49ers beating the Raiders 44–14. In 1994's Super Bowl XXIX, the 49ers won their last Super Bowl to date against the then-San Diego Chargers. The next year, the Los Angeles Raiders returned to Oakland.

=== 2000s ===
On October 8, 2000, Oakland defeated San Francisco 34–28 in overtime with Rich Gannon connecting with Tim Brown for 2 touchdowns and the Niners' Jeff Garcia passing for four touchdowns. On November 3, 2002, the 49ers defeated the Raiders 23–20 in overtime at the Oakland Coliseum with Jose Cortez kicking a 23-yard field goal to win the game.

On October 8, 2006, the 49ers beat the Raiders 34–20 at Candlestick with Oakland quarterbacks Andrew Walter and Marques Tuiasosopo throwing four interceptions, three of which were by Walt Harris.

=== 2010s ===
On October 17, 2010, the 49ers defeated the Raiders 17–9, giving them their first win of the season after a 5-game losing streak. Raiders quarterback Jason Campbell was held to just 83 yards passing. In 2012, the 49ers under Colin Kaepernick lost Super Bowl XLVII to the Baltimore Ravens, with Kaepernick becoming permanent starter after Alex Smith suffered a concussion in Week 10.

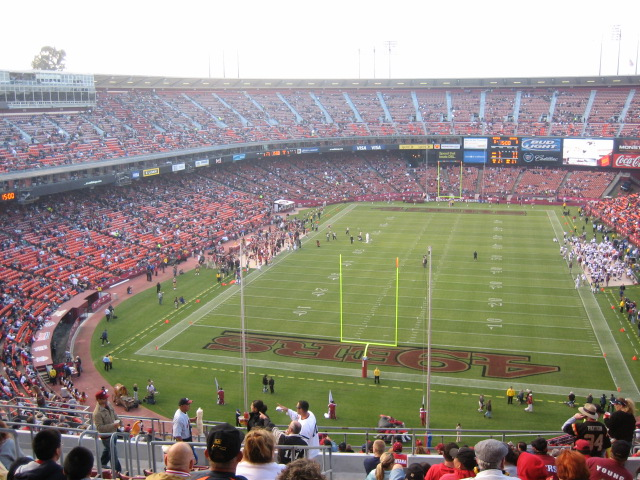
Candlestick Park, the site of the violence that ended preseason games between the 49ers and Raiders.

On December 7, 2014, the Derek Carr-led Raiders broke their three-game losing streak against the 49ers with a 24–13 win at the Oakland-Alameda County Coliseum.

On November 1, 2018, the 49ers, led by practice squad quarterback Nick Mullens, defeated the Raiders by a score of 34–3, ending a six-game losing streak. Mullens, who had his NFL debut, previously played and provided a game-winning touchdown in a preseason game against the Dallas Cowboys. This game concluded the "Battle of the Bay", the nickname for the geographical rivalry.

==== End of preseason games ====
Prior to the 2011 NFL season, the 49ers and Raiders regularly held a joint practice and then met during the preseason as a manifestation of their geographic rivalry. However, this came to an end when on August 20, 2011, the 49ers defeated the Raiders 17–3 at Candlestick Park. During the fourth quarter, a man was beaten in an "upper level stadium restroom" and after the game, a man wearing a shirt reading "Fuck the Niners" was shot multiple times in the stomach. It is however important to note that the prime suspect for the shooting was a Raiders fan as well.

The 49ers recommended the cessation of all preseason games between the two teams, which the NFL promptly agreed to. In the years following, head coaches of both teams have expressed hope that preseason games between the two teams could soon return, with 2017 Raiders coach Jack Del Rio stating the benefit of a 49ers-Raiders preseason game as a "decrease in travel".

Following the Raiders' move to Las Vegas, preseason games were once again scheduled between the two teams. Although the 2020 NFL preseason was canceled due to COVID-19, the two teams played preseason contests on August 29, 2021, in Santa Clara and on August 13, 2023, in Las Vegas. Prior to the 2023 contest, the two teams held joint practice sessions at the Raiders Training Facility in Henderson, Nevada.

=== 2020s ===
On January 1, 2023, the 49ers won the game 37–34 in overtime after the Raiders threw an interception. The loss eliminated the Raiders from the playoffs.

In 2024, the Raiders hosted Super Bowl LVIII in Allegiant Stadium, whose contenders were later determined to be their rivals the 49ers and the Kansas City Chiefs.

== Game results ==
Regular season displayed only.

Season	Date	Home team	Site	Result	Overall series
1970	December 20	Raiders	Oakland-Alameda County Coliseum	49ers 38–7	49ers 1–0
1974	November 29	49ers	Candlestick Park	Raiders 35–24	Tied 1–1
1979	November 4	Raiders	Oakland-Alameda County Coliseum	Raiders 23–10	Raiders 2–1
1982	September 12	49ers	Candlestick Park	Raiders 23–17	Raiders 3–1
1985	September 22	Raiders	Los Angeles Memorial Coliseum	49ers 34–10	Raiders 3–2
1988	November 13	49ers	Candlestick Park	Raiders 9–3	Raiders 4–2
1991	September 29	Raiders	Los Angeles Memorial Coliseum	Raiders 12–6	Raiders 5–2
1994	September 5	49ers	Candlestick Park	49ers 44–14	Raiders 5–3
2000	October 8	49ers	3Com Park	Raiders 34–28 (OT)	Raiders 6–3
2002	November 3	Raiders	Network Associates Coliseum	49ers 23–20 (OT)	Raiders 6–4
2006	October 8	49ers	Monster Park	49ers 34–20	Raiders 6–5
2010	October 17	49ers	Candlestick Park	49ers 17–9	Tied 6–6
2014	December 7	Raiders	O.co Coliseum	Raiders 24–13	Raiders 7–6
2018	November 1	49ers	Levi's Stadium	49ers 34–3	Tied 7–7
2022	January 1	Raiders	Allegiant Stadium	49ers 37–34 (OT)	49ers 8–7
2026	November 8	49ers	Levi's Stadium	49ers 38–17	49ers 9–7

== See also ==
- National Football League rivalries
- Bay Bridge Series the former series between the Giants and Athletics. The series ended in 2024 after the Athletics relocated to Las Vegas (and Sacramento in the interim).
