= Lakers–Warriors rivalry =

National Basketball Association rivalry

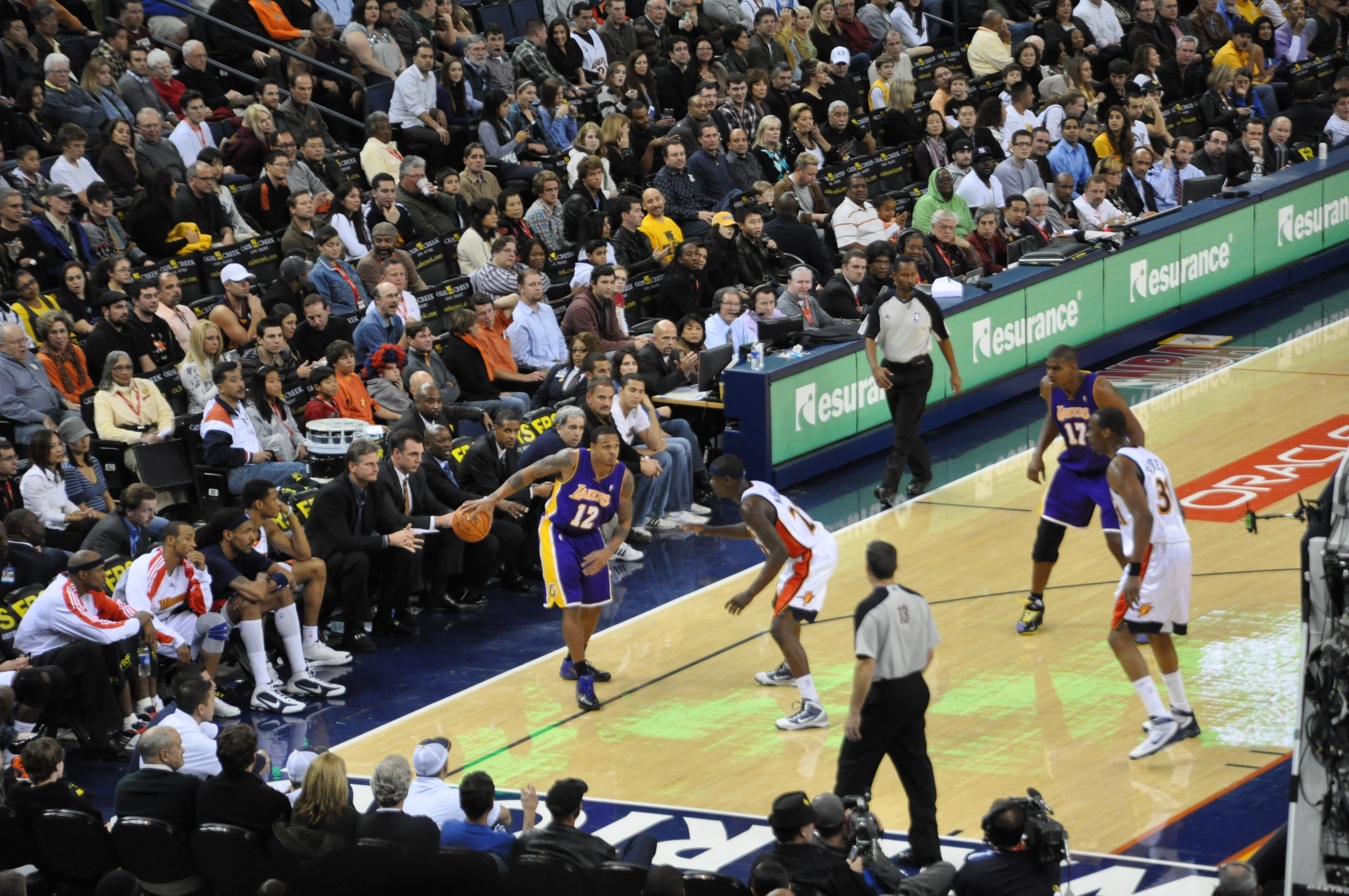
- Lakers' Shannon Brown being defended by Warriors' Anthony Morrow during a 2007–08 regular season game at the Oracle Arena

- Los Angeles Lakers Golden State Warriors
- First meeting: November 28, 1948; Lakers 88, Warriors 67
- Latest meeting: October 30, 2026; Lakers 95, Warriors 112
- Next meeting: January 21st, 2027

Statistics
- Total meetings: 490
- All-time series: 298–192 (LAL)
- Regular season series: 269–179 (LAL)
- Postseason results: 28–13 (LAL)
- Longest win streak: LAL W12
- Current win streak: GSW W1

Postseason history
- 1967 Western Division Semifinals: Warriors won, 3–0; 1968 Western Division Finals: Lakers won, 4–0; 1969 Western Division Semifinals: Lakers won, 4–2; 1973 Western Conference Finals: Lakers won, 4–1; 1977 Western Conference Semifinals: Lakers won, 4–3; 1987 Western Conference Semifinals: Lakers won, 4–1; 1991 Western Conference Semifinals: Lakers won 4–1; 2023 Western Conference Semifinals: Lakers won, 4–2

The Lakers–Warriors rivalry is a National Basketball Association (NBA) rivalry between the Los Angeles Lakers and the Golden State Warriors. Unlike most sports rivalries between Northern and Southern California, there is more mutual respect present between both teams as opposed to fierce animosity; such as the Dodgers–Giants rivalry in the MLB or 49ers–Rams rivalry of the NFL. Geography plays a large role as both franchises are largely popular within the state, however; the Lakers have historically been extremely dominant in the series as they have won six of the seven playoff matchups against the Warriors, and have among the most championships in league history. However, the Warriors had overcome years of playoff futility with the arrival of such players as Stephen Curry, Klay Thompson, and Draymond Green during the 2010s, winning them four championships from 2015 to 2022. The Lakers had overcome their own struggles following the retirement of Hall of Fame guard Kobe Bryant, but rebuilt around strong free agent signings with the likes of LeBron James and Anthony Davis, leading them to win the 2020 NBA Finals. Both teams have met eight times in the postseason, combining for 38 division titles since both teams relocated to California in the early 1960s. Notably, prior to his signing with the Lakers; LeBron James had faced off against Stephen Curry and the Warriors in four straight NBA Finals appearances from when he was a member of the Cleveland Cavaliers. Both teams combine for 24 championships between them. The Lakers lead the all time regular season series 267–178, and the postseason series 28–13.

== History ==
=== 1960s/1970s: NBA comes to California ===
Both teams were introduced into the NBA during the late 1940s, the Warriors joining in 1946 as the Philadelphia Warriors, while the Lakers joined in 1948 as the Minneapolis Lakers. Both franchises began a brief string of success by winning numerous championships by the end of the decade, and even leading into the 1950s. However, poor attendance began to plague both teams, leading to financial issues as the league was unable to support both. Lakers' owner Bob Short took notice of the Dodgers relocation to Los Angeles in 1957, and sought a more lucrative market in California to help the Lakers stay financially viable. Short announced he was relocating the Lakers to Los Angeles for the 1960 season, quickly capitalizing on the growth within the city and helping the Lakers regain a strong following. Meanwhile, in 1961 Warriors owner Franklin Mieuli had begun purchasing majority shares in the team. Though iconic players such as Wilt Chamberlain drew modest attendance numbers, Mieuli took notice of the Lakers' relocation to California and sought to do the same in an effort to increase his team's value.

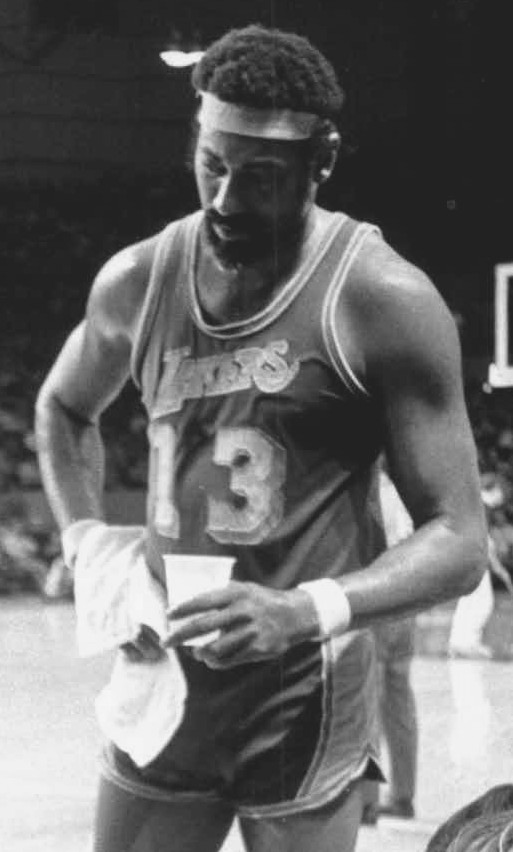
Wilt Chamberlain was an All-Star for both teams during the 1960s and 1970s

The Warriors began play in San Francisco during the 1962–63 NBA season, but found crowds to be adversely responding to the move as initial response saw attendance dip to record-lows. Shortly afterwards; the drafting of Nate Thurmond as a side-weapon for Chamberlain did in fact improve attendance as the team would make an appearance in the 1964 NBA Finals. Despite their best efforts to improve in contention with Chamberlain, he was traded to the upstart-Philadelphia 76ers. Both teams proved to be strong postseason contenders through the 1960s, but ironically would fall to the dynasty of the Bill Russell-led Boston Celtics. Near the end of the decade, both teams would find themselves brand-new arenas in Oakland and Los Angeles respectively. The Warriors began the 1966–67 season strong in their new arena, making an appearance in the Finals, but ironically would fall to the Philadelphia 76ers. Chamberlain would also be traded to the Lakers prior to the start of the 1968 season, after being awarded league MVP the following year.

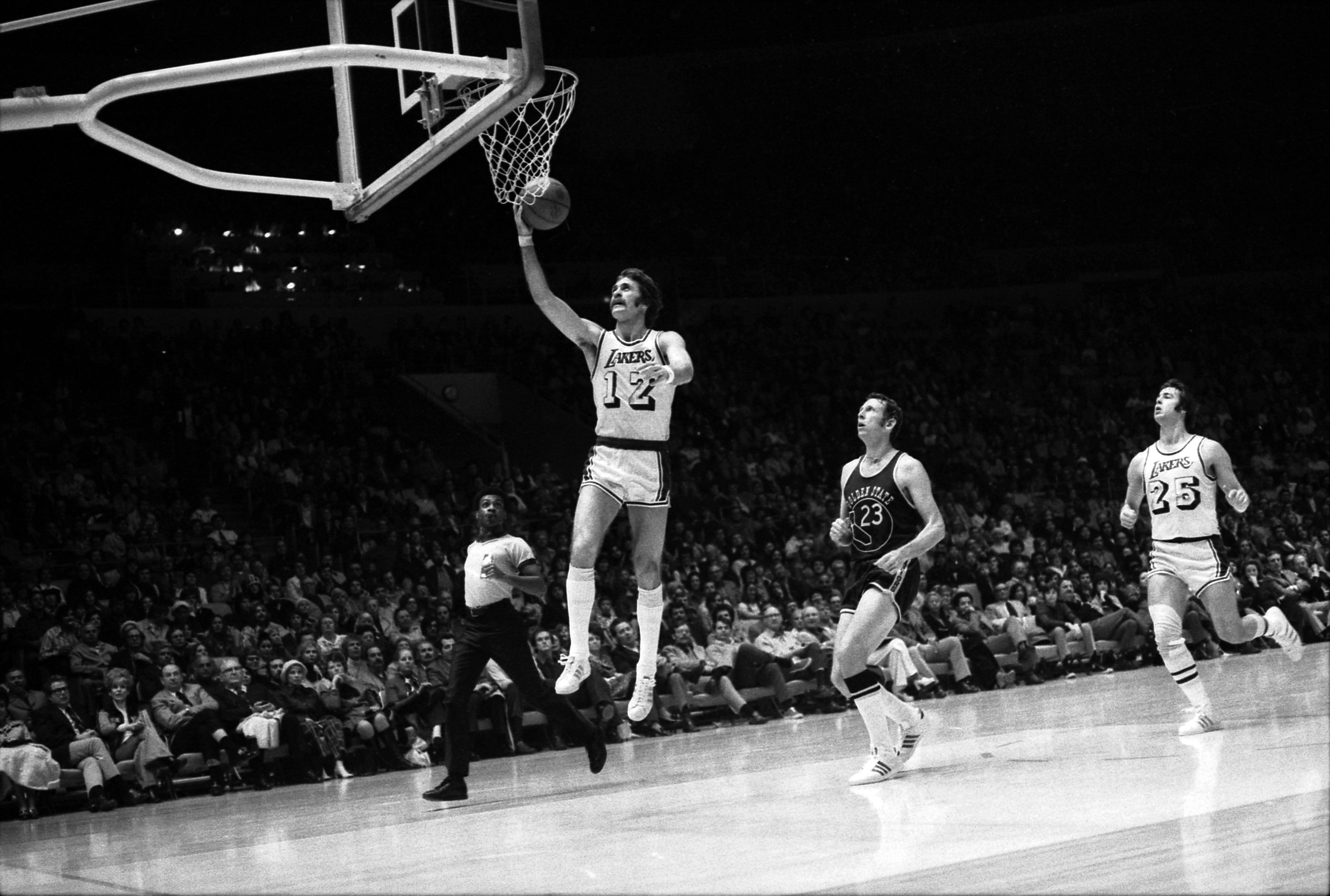
Lakers' Pat Riley going for a lay-up during a regular season game against the Warriors in 1974.

Despite the frequent championship losses, both teams finally managed to win a championship through the 1970s, the Lakers in 1972 (led by Chamberlain and Jerry West), and the Warriors in 1975 (led by Rick Barry). The Lakers armed with new-signing Kareem Abdul-Jabbar began to rebuild towards playoff contention.

=== 1980s: The Lakers dynasty ===
The Warriors began to experience a strong playoff drought following their loss to the Lakers in the 1976–77 Conference Semifinals. They would fail to make a single postseason appearance for much of the duration of the 1980s. During this time the Lakers had rebuilt into a dynasty of their own, popularly known as the Showtime Lakers. In 1979, new owner Jerry Buss sought to draft Michigan State prospect Magic Johnson, in addition to building a postseason juggernaut around such players as Abdul-Jabbar, James Worthy, Kurt Rambis, and A.C. Green. Near the middle of the decade, the Warriors began a rebuild of their own, dubbed the Run TMC team after teammates: Tim Hardaway, Mitch Richmond and Chris Mullin. The Warriors also lured famed coach George Karl in 1986, also setting them up as strong playoff contenders. Both teams famously met during the 1987 NBA Playoffs. Though the Lakers were heavily favored to crush the Warriors in a sweep, the Warriors still held on by an average margin of 12 points per loss, though the Lakers still won the series handily in a 4–1 victory. Game 4 is still shown on TV in the NBA's Greatest Games series, remembered as an instant classic. The second-half performance by the Warriors' All-Star point guard Sleepy Floyd still stands as the NBA playoff record for points scored in a quarter (29) and in a half (39).

=== 1990s: The Warriors stay afloat ===
With the conclusion of the 1991 NBA Finals, the Lakers' dynasty had begun to fade away as the notorious Michael Jordan-led Chicago Bulls teams regularly toppled opponents in the postseason. The Warriors still managed to emerge as a contender, particularly during the early 1990s after acquiring future all-stars Chris Webber and Latrell Sprewell through the draft. The Lakers sought to rebuild during the latter half of the decade by making several high-profile acquisitions, such as signing legendary center Shaquille O'Neal in 1996 and acquiring the draft rights to future hall-of-famer Kobe Bryant the same year. The Warriors' attempts to stay competitive soon collapsed as they frequently rotated coaches. Following the 1993–94 season; the Warriors found themselves swept by the Charles Barkley-led Phoenix Suns. The Warriors would find themselves unable to post a winning season until 2006. The Lakers managed to re-emerge as playoff contenders during the latter half of the decade, but often fell to David Robinson and the San Antonio Spurs in the postseason. However, following the 1998–99 season, the Lakers fired head coach Del Harris and replaced him with Phil Jackson, who coached the Bulls throughout much of the 1990s and guided them to 6 championships in the decade.

=== 2000s: The Lakers Dominance Continues ===
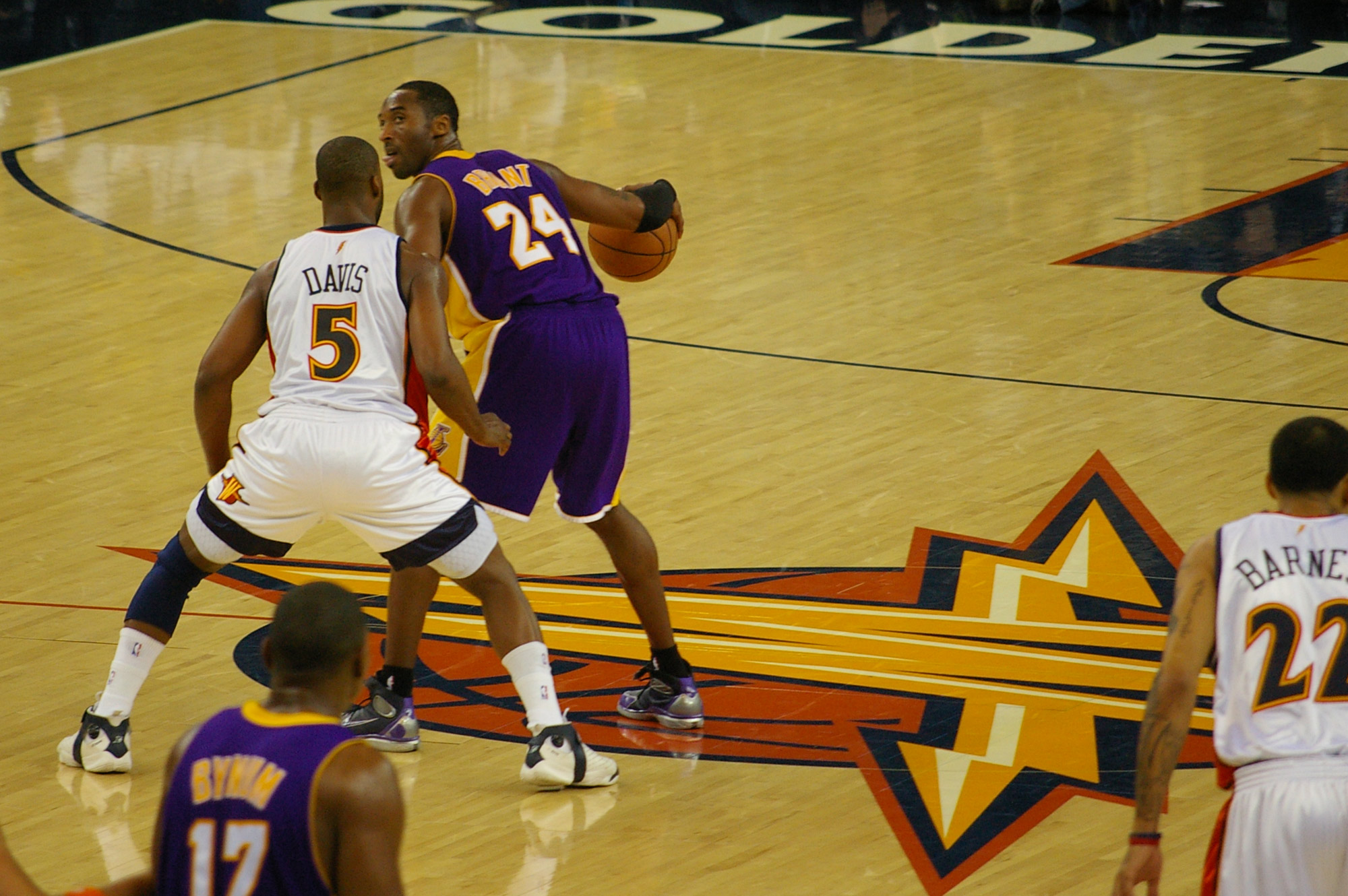
Warriors' Baron Davis guarding Lakers' Kobe Bryant during a regular season game at the Oracle Arena in December 2007

Led by Jackson, the Lakers quickly emerged into the new millennium as a playoff juggernaut. Armed with such players as Bryant, Shaq, Rick Fox, Derek Fisher, Ron Harper, and Robert Horry; they managed to win three straight championships from 2000 to 2002. The Warriors meanwhile had found themselves scraping the floor at the bottom of the league, however; they would reemerge into postseason contention around 2006 with the acquisitions of such players as Stephen Jackson, Matt Barnes, and Baron Davis. The Lakers would run into multiple issues, derailing their dynasty as the feud between Bryant and O'Neal had begun to briefly disassemble the team near the latter half of the decade. Despite this; the Lakers re armed themselves with new center Pau Gasol and forward Lamar Odom. The Lakers re emerged as title contenders, making three straight appearances in the finals from 2008 to 2010, winning two more championships in the process. The Warriors had begun to seek a deep rebuild of the franchise during the 2009 draft, in taking Davidson point guard Stephen Curry seventh overall.

=== 2010s: The Warriors take over ===
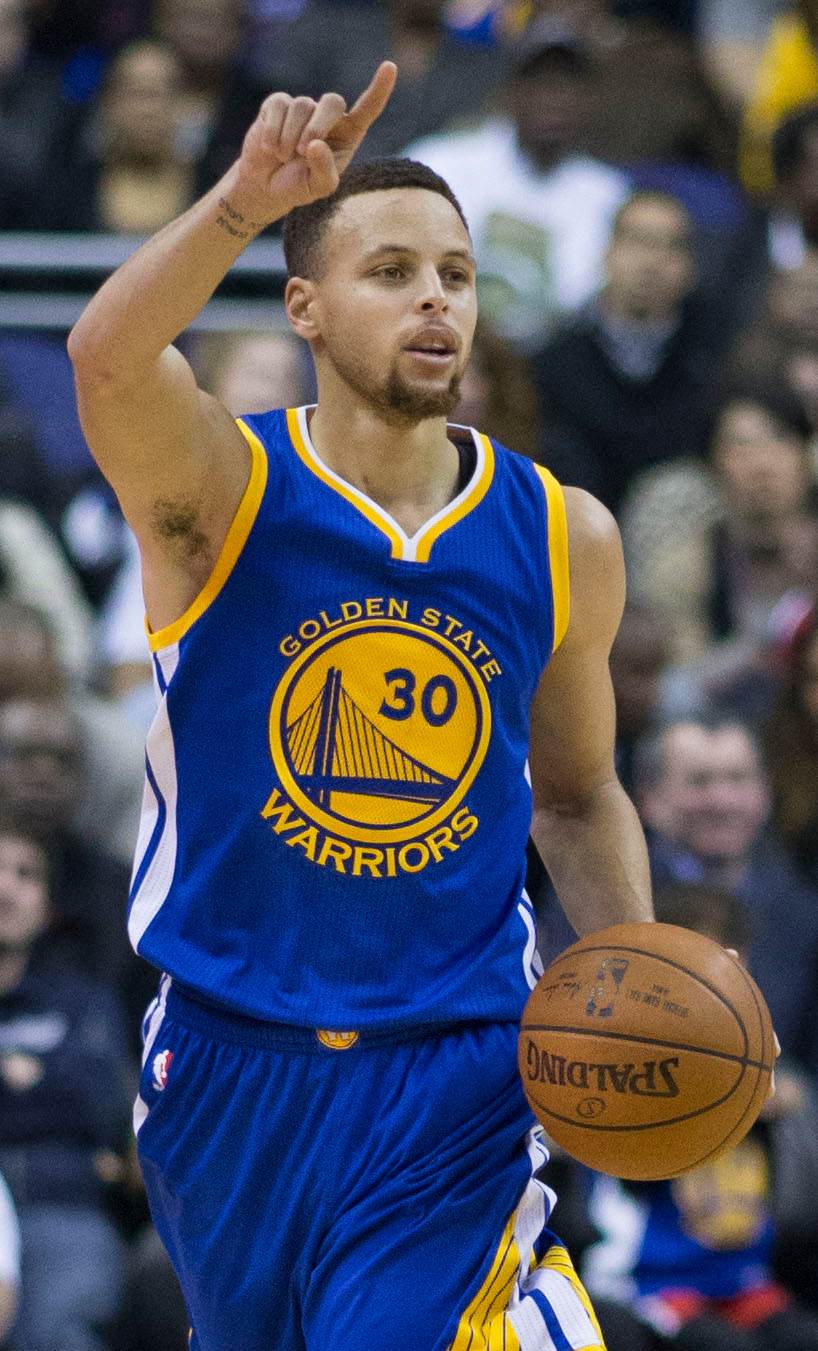
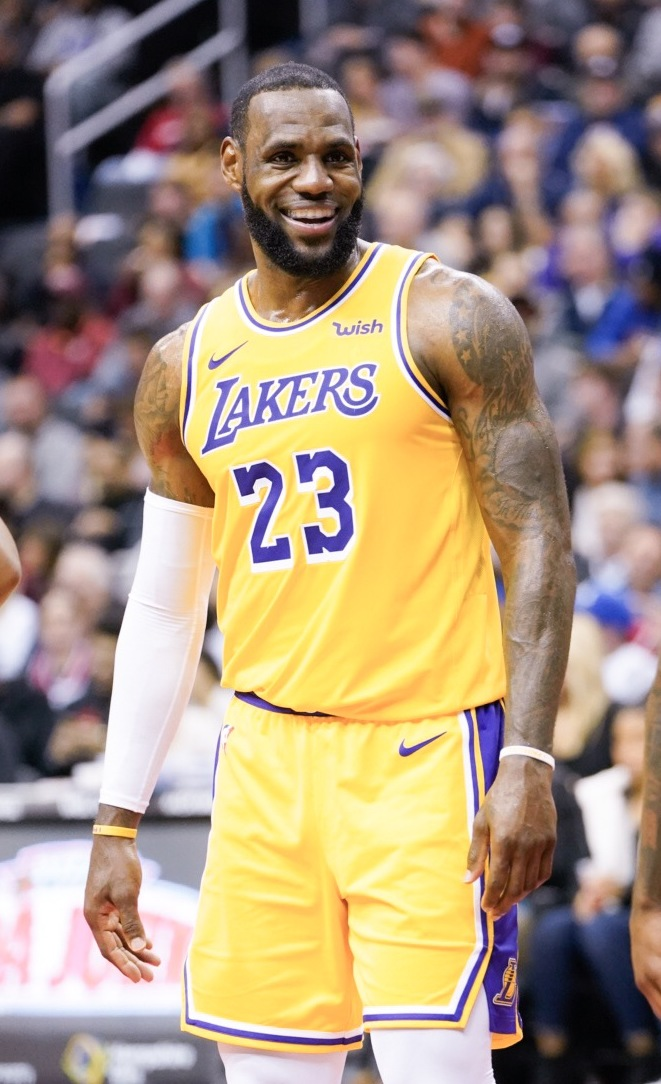
The Lakers' LeBron James (right) and the Warriors' Stephen Curry (left) have been perennial All-Stars at the center of the recent growth of the rivalry.

The Lakers remained a sturdy contender headed into the 2010s, but signs of decline were growing further evident as Kobe Bryant began fighting injury on a regular basis. The Warriors were still rebuilding as they would also draft future All-Star Klay Thompson out of Washington State during the 2011 NBA draft, the following season; they would also draft future All-Star power forward Draymond Green the following season. Rather quickly as the Lakers decline began, the Warriors emerged as a title contender, making regular appearances in the postseason, and managing to truly emerge as champions once again during the 2015 NBA Finals. The 2013 signing of small forward Andre Iguodala would also reinforce a potent offense, propelling the Warriors to five straight finals appearances, winning three. During the 2016 season, Bryant announced his retirement; publicly highlighting the Lakers decline as they would fail to make the postseason from 2014 to 2019. On January 14, Kobe played his final game in Oakland but the Warriors won 118–96. Another notable game was on March 6 where the Lakers upset the Warriors in a 112–95 win. It would be Kobe Bryant's last game against the Warriors. On November 4, Stephen Curry shot 0-10 from three, causing his streak of 157 games with a three to end in a 117–97 loss. In a widely publicized move during the 2018 offseason; the Lakers signed legendary star LeBron James, and ended up trading for all-star Power Forward/Center Anthony Davis the following season. In the 2018–19 season, the Warriors and Lakers had big moments against each other. On MLK Day, Klay Thompson dropped 44 points in a 130–111 blowout win. On February 2, the Warriors beat the Lakers 115–101. On April 8, the Warriors beat the Lakers 108–90. Once again the Lakers emerged as a title contender, winning the COVID-19 shortened 2020 NBA Finals. The Warriors were all too familiar with James as they had faced off in four straight finals against him whilst he was still on the Cleveland Cavaliers, though the 2019–20 season saw the Warriors battle injury that ended up costing them a postseason appearance for another two seasons.

=== 2020s–present: Battling for the Western Conference championship ===
During the first two years of the decade, both teams struggled with various issues. The Lakers had also begun to fight several high-profile injuries in addition to multiple poor free agent signings. Both teams met in the 2021 Play-In Tournament. Despite Stephen Curry dropping 37 points, the Lakers defeated the Warriors 103–100. In 2022, Stephen Curry, LeBron James, Anthony Davis, Russell Westbrook, and Carmelo Anthony were named to the NBA 75th Anniversary Team. However, the Lakers were eliminated from playoffs/play-in contention while the Warriors defeated the Boston Celtics in six games to capture their 7th title. The Warriors managed to regain their competitiveness to start the 2022–23 season, while the Lakers managed to scrape together a winning record, entering the postseason as the seventh seed. Both teams met during the second round of the playoffs, with the Lakers winning the series in six games. In the 2023–24 season, the two teams met to end NBA Rivals Week. Despite Stephen Curry dropping 46 points, the Lakers beat the Warriors 145–144 in a double overtime thriller on LeBron James' game winning free throws. However, the Warriors won the next three meetings. Both teams met again on Christmas Day on December 25, 2024. Curry dropped, at the time, a season-high 38 points, however Austin Reaves made a clutch layup at the end to give the Lakers the lead and win the game. In February 2025, the Lakers dealt Anthony Davis to the Dallas Mavericks as part of a three-team trade to acquire Luka Dončić. In July 2026, LeBron James signed with the Philadelphia 76ers, ending his 8-year stint with the Lakers.

Both teams faced each other in West Group C of the 2026 NBA Cup, marking their first-ever tournament matchup since its inception. In that group stage game, the Warriors beat the Lakers 112–95, overcoming a 25-point lead that the Lakers blew by halftime.

== Season-by-season results ==
Minneapolis/Los Angeles Lakers vs. Philadelphia/San Francisco/Golden State Warriors Season-by-Season Results
1940s (Lakers 8–3)

Season	Season series		at Minneapolis Lakers	at Philadelphia Warriors	at Neutral Site	Overall series	Notes
1948–49	Lakers	4–1	Lakers, 3–0	Tie, 1–1		Lakers; 4–1	The National Basketball League (NBL) merged with the Basketball Association of America (BAA), merging the Lakers and Warriors in the same league. Lakers are placed in the Western Division. Lakers win 1949 BAA Finals.
1949–50	Lakers	4–2	Lakers, 2–0	Warriors, 2–1	Lakers, 1–0	Lakers, 8–3	Neutral site game was played at St. Paul Auditorium, St. Paul, Minnesota. The Basketball Association of America merged with the National Basketball Association (NBA). Lakers temporarily move to the Central Division. Lakers win the inaugural 1950 NBA Finals.

1950s (Lakers, 43–37)

Season	Season series		at Minneapolis Lakers	at Philadelphia Warriors	at Neutral site	Overall series	Notes
1950–51	Lakers	4–2	Lakers, 3–0	Warriors, 2–1		Lakers, 12–5	Lakers move back to the Western Division. Lakers finish with the best record in the league (44–24).
1951–52	Warriors	4–2	Lakers, 2–1	Warriors, 3–0		Lakers, 14–9	Last season the Warriors played at Philadelphia Arena. Lakers win 1952 NBA Finals.
1952–53	Lakers	6–0	Lakers, 2–0	Lakers, 2–0	Lakers, 2–0	Lakers, 20–9	Neutral site games were played at: Cleveland Arena, Cleveland, Ohio; St. Paul Auditorium; Starting this season, the Warriors mostly played their home games at Philadelphia Civic Center and part-time at Philadelphia Arena. Lakers finish with the best record in the league (48–22). Lakers win 1953 NBA Finals.
1953–54	Lakers	6–2	Lakers, 2–0	Tie, 1–1	Lakers, 3–1	Lakers, 26–11	Neutral site games were played at: Spencer Fieldhouse, Spencer, Iowa; Huron College, Huron, South Dakota; Grand Rapids Civic Auditorium, Grand Rapids, Michigan; New Haven Arena, New Haven, Connecticut; Lakers finish with the best record in the league (46–26).Lakers win 1954 NBA Finals.
1954–55	Lakers	6–3	Lakers, 3–0	Warriors, 3–1	Lakers, 2–0	Lakers, 32–14	Neutral site games were played at: Chicago Stadium, Chicago, Illinois; Veterans Memorial Auditorium, Des Moines, Iowa.
1955–56	Warriors	6–3	Warriors, 2–1	Warriors, 2–1	Warriors, 2–1	Lakers, 35–20	Neutral site games were played at: Hershey Sports Arena, Hershey, Pennsylvania, Madison Square Garden (III), New York City, New York; St. Paul Auditorium; Warriors finish with the best record in the league (45–27). Warriors win 1956 NBA Finals.
1956–57	Lakers	5–4	Lakers, 3–0	Warriors, 4–0	Lakers, 2–0	Lakers, 40–24	Neutral site games were played at: Kiel Auditorium, St. Louis, Missouri; St. Paul Auditorium
1957–58	Warriors	6–3	Lakers, 3–1	Warriors, 2–0	Warriors, 3–0	Lakers, 43–30	Neutral site games were played at: Hershey Sports Arena; Detroit Olympia, Detroit, Michigan; Bethlehem High School, Bethlehem, Pennsylvania
1958–59	Lakers	6–3	Lakers, 4–0	Warriors, 2–1	Tie, 1–1	Lakers, 49–33	Neutral site games were played at: Kiel Auditorium; Camden Convention Hall, Camden, New Jersey; Lakers lose 1959 NBA Finals.
1959–60	Warriors	7–2	Lakers, 1–0	Warriors, 4–0	Warriors, 3–1	Lakers, 51–40	Neutral site games were played at: St. Paul Auditorium; Madison Square Garden (III); Cow Palace, Daly City, California; Los Angeles Memorial Sports Arena, Los Angeles, California; Lakers temporarily play at Minneapolis Armory. Last season the Lakers played as a Minneapolis team.

1960s (Lakers, 60–47)

Season	Season series		at Los Angeles Lakers	at Philadelphia/San Francisco Warriors	at Neutral site	Overall series	Notes
1960–61	Warriors	8–2	Tie, 2–2	Warriors, 4–0	Warriors, 2–0	Lakers, 53–48	Neutral site games were played at: Kiel Auditorium; Madison Square Garden (III); Lakers relocated to Los Angeles and play at Los Angeles Memorial Sports Arena.
1961–62	Lakers	6–3	Lakers, 3–1	Lakers, 2–1	Tie, 1–1	Lakers, 59–51	Neutral site games were played at: Madison Square Garden (III); Hershey Sports Arena; Last season the Warriors played as a Philadelphia team. Lakers lose 1962 NBA Finals.
1962–63	Lakers	8–4	Lakers, 4–2	Lakers, 4–2		Lakers, 67–55	Warriors relocate to San Francisco and played at Cow Palace. Warriors are moved to the Western Division, becoming divisional rivals with the Lakers. Lakers win the Western Division. Lakers lose 1963 NBA Finals.
1963–64	Warriors	7–5	Tie, 3–3	Warriors, 4–2		Lakers, 72–62	Warriors win their first Western Division title. Warriors lose 1964 NBA Finals.
1964–65	Lakers	8–2	Lakers, 4–1	Lakers, 4–1		Lakers, 80–64	Warriors temporarily played at San Francisco Civic Auditorium. Lakers win the Western Division. Lakers lose 1965 NBA Finals.
1965–66	Lakers	7–3	Lakers, 3–2	Lakers, 3–1	Lakers, 1–0	Lakers, 87–67	Neutral site game was played at Las Vegas Convention Center, Las Vegas, Nevada. Lakers win the Western Division. Lakers lose 1966 NBA Finals.
1966–67	Warriors	6–3	Tie, 2–2	Warriors, 2–1	Warriors, 2–0	Lakers, 90–73	Neutral site games were played at: Oakland–Alameda County Coliseum Arena, Oakland, California; San Diego Sports Arena, San Diego, California; Warriors split home games between San Francisco Civic Auditorium and Cow Palace. Warriors win the Western Division.
1967 Western Division Semifinals	Warriors	3–0	Warriors, 1–0	Warriors, 2–0		Lakers, 90–76	1st postseason series. First and to date only time Warriors defeated the Lakers in the postseason. This was also the first postseason series between two California-based professional sports teams among the four major North American sports leagues. Warriors go on to lose 1967 NBA Finals.
1967–68	Tie	4–4	Lakers, 3–1	Warriors, 3–1		Lakers, 94–80	Lakers move to The Forum on December 31, 1967. (now known as Kia Forumn). Warriors move back to Cow Palace.
1968 Western Division Finals	Lakers	4–0	Lakers, 2–0	Lakers, 2–0		Lakers, 98–80	2nd postseason series. First time Lakers sweep the Warriors in the postseason. Lakers go on to lose 1968 NBA Finals.
1968–69	Lakers	4–3	Tie, 2–2	Lakers, 2–1		Lakers, 102–83	Lakers record their 100th win over the Warriors. Lakers win the Western Division.
1969 Western Division Semifinals	Lakers	4–2	Warriors, 2–1	Lakers, 3–0		Lakers, 106–85	3rd postseason series. Lakers become the first team to win a playoff series after losing the first 2 games at home. Lakers go on to lose 1969 NBA Finals.
1969–70	Lakers	5–2	Lakers, 2–1	Lakers, 2–1	Lakers, 1–0	Lakers, 111–87	Neutral site game was played at Astrodome, Houston, Texas. Last season the rivalry was played at a neutral site. Lakers lose 1970 NBA Finals.

1970s (Lakers, 41–28)

Season	Season series		at Los Angeles Lakers	at San Francisco/Golden State Warriors	Overall series	Notes
1970–71	Lakers	4–2	Lakers, 3–0	Warriors, 2–1	Lakers, 115–89	Lakers and Warriors are placed in the Western Conference and the Pacific Division. Lakers win the inaugural Pacific Division title. Last season until the 2019 season the Warriors played in San Francisco.
1971–72	Lakers	5–1	Lakers, 2–1	Lakers, 3–0	Lakers, 120–90	Warriors relocate across the Bay to Oakland and rename themselves to the Golden State Warriors. On March 19, 1972, Lakers beat the Warriors 162–99, setting a record for their most points scored against the Warriors, their highest point differential against the Warriors with a 63-point differential, and a franchise record for most points scored in a game. After their loss to the Warriors on October 31, 1971, Lakers go on a 33-game win streak, the longest win streak in NBA history. Lakers win the Pacific Division. Lakers finish with the best record in the league (69–13). Lakers win 1972 NBA Finals.
1972–73	Lakers	4–3	Warriors, 2–1	Lakers, 3–1	Lakers, 124–93	Lakers win the Pacific Division.
1973 Western Conference Finals	Lakers	4–1	Lakers, 3–0	Tie, 1–1	Lakers, 128–94	4th postseason series. Lakers go on to lose 1973 NBA Finals.
1973–74	Warriors	4–2	Lakers, 2–1	Warriors, 3–0	Lakers, 130–98	Lakers win the Pacific Division.
1974–75	Warriors	5–2	Tie, 2–2	Warriors, 3–0	Lakers, 132–103	Warriors record their 100th win over the Lakers. Warriors win their first Pacific Division. Warriors win 1975 NBA Finals.
1975–76	Warriors	5–2	Lakers, 2–1	Warriors, 4–0	Lakers, 134–108	Warriors win the Pacific Division. Warriors finish with the best record in the league (59–23).
1976–77	Tie	2–2	Lakers, 2–0	Warriors, 2–0	Lakers, 136–110	Lakers win the Pacific Division. Lakers finish with the best record in the league (53–29).
1977 Western Conference Semifinals	Lakers	4–3	Lakers, 4–0	Warriors, 3–0	Lakers, 140–113	5th postseason series. Warriors win 16 games in a row at home against the Lakers.
1977–78	Lakers	4–0	Lakers, 2–0	Lakers, 2–0	Lakers, 144–113	
1978–79	Lakers	3–1	Tie, 2–2	Lakers, 2–0	Lakers, 147–114	
1979–80	Lakers	5–1	Lakers, 3–0	Lakers, 2–1	Lakers, 152–115	Lakers win the Pacific Division. Lakers win 1980 NBA Finals.

1980s (Lakers, 46–17)

Season	Season series		at Los Angeles Lakers	at Golden State Warriors	Overall series	Notes
1980–81	Lakers	5–1	Lakers, 3–0	Lakers, 2–1	Lakers, 157–116	
1981–82	Tie	3–3	Lakers, 3–0	Warriors, 3–0	Lakers, 160–119	Lakers win the Pacific Division. Lakers win 1982 NBA Finals.
1982–83	Lakers	5–1	Lakers, 2–1	Lakers, 3–0	Lakers, 165–120	Lakers win the Pacific Division. Lakers lose 1983 NBA Finals.
1983–84	Tie	3–3	Lakers, 2–1	Warriors, 2–1	Lakers, 168–123	Lakers win the Pacific Division. Lakers lose 1984 NBA Finals.
1984–85	Lakers	5–1	Lakers, 3–0	Lakers, 2–1	Lakers, 173–124	Lakers win the Pacific Division. Lakers win 1985 NBA Finals.
1985–86	Lakers	4–2	Lakers, 2–1	Lakers, 2–1	Lakers, 177–126	Lakers win the Pacific Division.
1986–87	Lakers	4–2	Lakers, 3–0	Warriors, 2–1	Lakers, 181–128	Lakers win the Pacific Division. Lakers finish with the best record in the league (65–17).
1987 Western Conference Semifinals	Lakers	4–1	Lakers, 3–0	Tie, 1–1	Lakers, 185–129	6th postseason series. Lakers go on to win 1987 NBA Finals.
1987–88	Lakers	6–0	Lakers, 3–0	Lakers, 3–0	Lakers, 191–129	First time the Lakers swept the Warriors in a six-game season series. Lakers win the Pacific Division. Lakers finish with the best record in the league (62–20). Lakers win 1988 NBA Finals.
1988–89	Lakers	3–2	Tie, 1–1	Lakers, 2–1	Lakers, 194–131	Lakers win 10 games in a row against the Warriors. Lakers win the Pacific Division. Lakers lose 1989 NBA Finals.
1989–90	Lakers	4–1	Lakers, 3–0	Tie, 1–1	Lakers, 198–132	Lakers win the Pacific Division. Lakers finish with the best record in the league (63–19).

1990s (Lakers, 31–18)

Season	Season series		at Los Angeles Lakers	at Golden State Warriors	Overall series	Notes
1990–91	Lakers	3–2	Lakers, 2–0	Warriors, 2–1	Lakers, 201–134	Lakers record their 200th win over the Warriors.
1991 Western Conference Semifinals	Lakers	4–1	Lakers, 2–1	Lakers, 2–0	Lakers, 205–135	7th postseason series. Lakers win 12 home playoff games in a row. Lakers go on to lose 1991 NBA Finals.
1991–92	Warriors	3–2	Warriors, 2–1	Tie, 1–1	Lakers, 207–138	Warriors win the season series for the first time since the 1975 season. Warriors also finish with a winning record in Los Angeles for the first time since the 1972 season.
1992–93	Lakers	4–1	Lakers, 2–0	Lakers, 2–1	Lakers, 211–139	
1993–94	Warriors	5–0	Warriors, 3–0	Warriors, 2–0	Lakers, 211–144	First time Warriors sweep the Lakers in the season series.
1994–95	Warriors	3–2	Lakers, 2–0	Warriors, 3–0	Lakers, 213–147	This remains the last season where at least five games or more are played in the season series.
1995–96	Lakers	3–1	Lakers, 2–0	Tie, 1–1	Lakers, 216–148	
1996–97	Lakers	4–0	Lakers, 2–0	Lakers, 2–0	Lakers, 220–148	Due to extensive renovations at the Oakland Coliseum Arena, the Warriors played their home games at the San Jose Arena (now known as SAP Center) in San Jose, California this season.
1997–98	Lakers	3–1	Lakers, 2–0	Tie, 1–1	Lakers, 223–149	
1998–99	Lakers	2–1	Tie, 1–1	Lakers, 1–0	Lakers, 225–150	Last season Lakers played at Great Western Forum.
1999–2000	Lakers	4–0	Lakers, 2–0	Lakers, 2–0	Lakers, 229–150	Lakers open up Staples Center (now known as Crypto.com Arena). Lakers win the Pacific Division. Lakers finish with the best record in the league (67–15). Lakers win 2000 NBA Finals.

2000s (Lakers, 32–8)

Season	Season series		at Los Angeles Lakers	at Golden State Warriors	Overall series	Notes
2000–01	Lakers	3–1	Lakers, 2–0	Tie, 1–1	Lakers, 232–151	Lakers win the Pacific Division. Lakers win 2001 NBA Finals.
2001–02	Lakers	3–1	Lakers, 2–0	Tie, 1–1	Lakers, 235–152	Lakers win 2002 NBA Finals.
2002–03	Tie	2–2	Tie, 1–1	Tie, 1–1	Lakers, 237–154	
2003–04	Lakers	3–1	Lakers, 2–0	Tie, 1–1	Lakers, 240–155	Lakers win the Pacific Division. Lakers lose 2004 NBA Finals.
2004–05	Lakers	3–1	Lakers, 2–0	Tie, 1–1	Lakers, 243–156	
2005–06	Lakers	4–0	Lakers, 2–0	Lakers, 2–0	Lakers, 247–156	
2006–07	Lakers	4–0	Lakers, 2–0	Lakers, 2–0	Lakers, 251–156	
2007–08	Tie	2–2	Tie, 1–1	Tie, 1–1	Lakers, 253–158	Lakers win 9 games in a row against the Warriors. Lakers win the Pacific Division. Lakers lose 2008 NBA Finals.
2008–09	Lakers	4–0	Lakers, 2–0	Lakers, 2–0	Lakers, 257–158	Lakers win the Pacific Division. Lakers win 2009 NBA Finals.
2009–10	Lakers	4–0	Lakers, 2–0	Lakers, 2–0	Lakers, 261–158	Lakers win the Pacific Division. Lakers win 2010 NBA Finals.

2010s (Warriors, 21–18)

Season	Season series		at Los Angeles Lakers	at Golden State Warriors	Overall series	Notes
2010–11	Lakers	3–1	Lakers, 2–0	Tie, 1–1	Lakers, 264–159	Lakers win 12 games in a row against the Warriors, their longest win streak against them. Lakers win the Pacific Division.
2011–12	Lakers	4–0	Lakers, 2–0	Lakers, 2–0	Lakers, 268–159	Lakers win the Pacific Division.
2012–13	Lakers	3–1	Lakers, 2–0	Tie, 1–1	Lakers, 271–160	
2013–14	Warriors	3–1	Tie, 1–1	Warriors, 2–0	Lakers, 272–163	Warriors win the season series for the first time since the 1994 season.
2014–15	Warriors	3–1	Tie, 1–1	Warriors, 2–0	Lakers, 273–166	Warriors win the Pacific Division. Warriors finish with the best record in the league (67–15). Warriors win 2015 NBA Finals, their first since the 1974 season.
2015–16	Warriors	3–1	Tie, 1–1	Warriors, 2–0	Lakers, 274–169	Warriors win the Pacific Division. Warriors finish with the best record in the league (73–9), setting an NBA record for most wins in an NBA season. Warriors lose 2016 NBA Finals.
2016–17	Warriors	3–1	Tie, 1–1	Warriors, 2–0	Lakers, 275–172	On November 23, 2016, Warriors beat the Lakers 149–106, their most points scored in a game against the Lakers and their largest victory against the Lakers with a 43-point differential. Warriors win the Pacific Division. Warriors finish with the best record in the league (67–15). Warriors win 2017 NBA Finals.
2017–18	Warriors	4–0	Warriors, 2–0	Warriors, 2–0	Lakers, 275–176	Warriors win 11 home games in a row against the Lakers. Warriors sweep the Lakers in the season series and finish with a winning record in Los Angeles for the first time since the 1993 season. Warriors win the Pacific Division. Warriors win 2018 NBA Finals.
2018–19	Warriors	3–1	Warriors, 2–0	Tie, 1–1	Lakers, 276–179	Last season Warriors played in Oakland. First season for LeBron James as a Laker. Warriors win the Pacific Division. Warriors lose 2019 NBA Finals.
2019–20	Lakers	3–0	Lakers, 1–0	Lakers, 2–0	Lakers, 279–179	Warriors relocate back to San Francisco and open up Chase Center. Due to the COVID-19 pandemic suspending the season, their final game scheduled in Los Angeles was canceled. Lakers win the Pacific Division. Lakers win 2020 NBA Finals.

2020s (Lakers, 19–13)

Season	Season series		at Los Angeles Lakers	at Golden State Warriors	Overall series	Notes
2020–21	Lakers	2–1	Tie, 1–1	Lakers, 1–0	Lakers, 281–180	
2021 NBA play-in tournament	Lakers	1–0	Lakers; 103–100	N/A	Lakers, 282–180	1st play-in matchup. Lakers get the 7th seed, while the Warriors were subsequently eliminated by the Memphis Grizzlies.
2021–22	Warriors	3–1	Tie, 1–1	Warriors, 2–0	Lakers, 283–183	Warriors win 2022 NBA Finals.
2022–23	Lakers	3–1	Lakers, 2–0	Tie, 1–1	Lakers, 286–184	
2023 Western Conference Semifinals	Lakers	4–2	Lakers, 3–0	Warriors, 2–1	Lakers, 290–186	8th postseason series. First postseason series in the 21st century.
2023–24	Warriors	3–1	Warriors, 2–0	Tie, 1–1	Lakers, 291–189	Lakers win the inaugural 2023 NBA Cup.
2024–25	Lakers	3–1	Tie, 1–1	Lakers, 2–0	Lakers, 294–190	First season with Luka Doncic as a Laker.
2025–26	Lakers	3–1	Tie, 1–1	Lakers, 2–0	Lakers, 297–191	Final season with LeBron James as a Laker.
2026–27	Tie	1–1	Lakers, 1–0	Warriors, 1–0	Lakers, 298–192	On October 30, 2026, at San Francisco, the Warriors beat the Lakers 112–95 and overcame a 25-point deficit during the 2026 NBA Cup group stage.

Summary of Results

Season	Season series		at Minneapolis/Los Angeles Lakers	at Philadelphia/San Francisco/Golden State Warriors	at Neutral Site	Notes
Regular season games	Lakers	Lakers, 269–179	Lakers, 154–55	Warriors, 109–99	Lakers, 16–15	There were 31 Neutral site games played in total.
Postseason games	Lakers	28–13	Lakers, 18–4	Lakers, 10–9		
Postseason series	Lakers	7–1	Lakers, 5–0	Lakers, 2–1		Western Division Semifinals: 1967, 1969; Western Division Finals: 1968; Western Conference Semifinals: 1977, 1987, 1991, 2023; Western Conference Finals: 1973
NBA play-in tournament	Lakers	1–0	Lakers, 1–0			2021
Regular, postseason and play-in	Lakers	Lakers, 298–192	Lakers, 173–59	Warriors, 118–109	Lakers, 16–15	There were 31 Neutral site games played in total.: 5 games were played at St. Paul Auditorium.; 4 games were played at Madison Square Garden (III); 3 games were played at Hershey Sports Arena and Kiel Auditorium; 1 game was played at Cleveland Arena, Spencer Fieldhouse, Huron College, Grand Rapids Civic Auditorium, New Haven Arena, Chicago Stadium, Veterans Memorial Auditorium, Detroit Olympia, Bethlehem High School, Camden Convention Hall, Cow Palace, Los Angeles Memorial Sports Arena, Las Vegas Convention Center, Oakland–Alameda County Coliseum Arena, San Diego Sports Arena, and Astrodome.

== See also ==
- Sports in California
- Angels–Athletics rivalry
- Dodgers–Giants rivalry
- Chargers–Raiders rivalry
- 49ers–Rams rivalry
- Kings–Sharks rivalry
- California Clásico
