= Angels–Athletics rivalry =

Major League Baseball rivalry

- Los Angeles Angels Athletics
- Location: California
- First meeting: April 30, 1961; Wrigley Field, Los Angeles, California; Angels 6, Athletics 4
- Latest meeting: September 23, 2026; Sutter Health Park, West Sacramento, California; Athletics 7, Angels 3
- Next meeting: May 7, 2027; Sutter Health Park, West Sacramento, California
- Stadiums: Angels: Angel Stadium; Athletics: Sutter Health Park

Statistics
- Total meetings: 1,058
- Most wins: Athletics
- Regular season series: Athletics, 553–505 (.523)
- Largest victory: Angels: 18–2 (July 25, 1964); Athletics, 21–3 (September 20, 2018)
- Longest win streak: Angels, 12 (September 18, 1996–September 17, 1997); Athletics, 10 (May 26–September 3, 1974; April 26, 1991–April 20, 1992)
- Current win streak: Athletics, 2

Locations of the Los Angeles Angels and Athletics

The Angels–Athletics rivalry is a Major League Baseball (MLB) divisional rivalry played between the Angels and the Athletics. Both teams compete as member clubs of the American League (AL) West division, and both teams have grown a steady rivalry since the Athletics' relocation to California and to the AL West in 1968. Though not as intense as the Dodgers–Giants rivalry equivalent in the National League (NL) West; the A's and Angels have often battled for the division title on numerous occasions, with the added animosity between Northern and Southern California fueling the matchups. Despite this; the Athletics' impending relocation to Las Vegas likely wouldn't exclude geography as a factor, as Las Vegas is closer in proximity to Southern California. The Athletics lead the series 553–505, and the two teams have yet to meet in the postseason.

== Background ==
The Angels joined the American League in 1961 as an expansion team. The Athletics relocated to Oakland in 1968 after owner Charlie Finley endured much difficulty in securing a new ballpark in Kansas City, though Kansas City would later be granted an expansion franchise in 1969 known today as the Royals. The Athletics were one of the oldest franchises in league history, having joined the MLB in 1901 as the Philadelphia Athletics. Both teams struggled mightily through the 1960s as both encountered mediocre play, however; the Athletics began to quickly emerge as postseason titans, winning three straight World Series titles from 1972 to 1974. The Angels found a brief moment of postseason success as they reached the playoffs for the first time in 1979. The A's continued to stay competitive through the 1980s as they managed three appearances across the decade in the ALCS, even managing to win yet another World Series in 1989. The Angels would also manage two appearances in the ALCS in 1982 and 1986, but lost both times.

Both teams dealt with long term issues stemming from multiple mediocre seasons in which either team made the postseason, however; the rivalry began to have more implications within the division as the A's bolstered a younger lineup of future stars known famously as the "Moneyball" team. The Angels finished the 2002 season as runner-ups in the division, snagging a wild card berth; while the Athletics managed a record-setting 20 game win streak near the end of the season. Much to the shock of sportswriters and fans alike, the A's fell in the ALDS to the Minnesota Twins, while the Angels pushed on to win the World Series in an improbable playoff run. During the 2004 season, both teams came down to the wire tied for wins headed into the final series of the season, with the last three games being played in Oakland. Both teams were battling to secure the division title; however, Oakland fell in two crushing losses to the Angels with only one victory in the series coming in the final game of the year. Oakland would find themselves eliminated from the playoff hunt, though the Angels would go on to suffer a crushing sweep at the hands of the eventual champion Boston Red Sox.

As of 2024, both teams have yet to meet in the postseason. The animosity waned yet again during the decade as both teams struggled mightily in either playoff contention or maintaining a winning record. Tension began to resurface between both teams in 2023, when Angels' third baseman Anthony Rendon received a four-game suspension following an altercation with an Athletics fan during the season opener series in Oakland. The fan reportedly taunted Rendon for his injuries and play. In retaliation; Rendon attempted to rip the fan's shirt and was subsequently removed from the stadium and given a four game suspension. He was also fined an undisclosed amount.

== Season-by-season results ==
Angels vs. Athletics Season-by-Season Results
1960s (Angels, 88–74)

Season	Season series		at Los Angeles/California Angels	at Kansas City/Oakland Athletics	Overall series	Notes
1961	Tie	9‍–‍9	Angels, 6‍–‍3	Athletics, 6‍–‍3	Tie; 9‍–‍9	
1962	Angels	12‍–‍6	Angels, 6‍–‍3	Angels, 6‍–‍3	Angels; 21‍–‍15	
1963	Athletics	10‍–‍8	Athletics, 5‍–‍4	Athletics, 5‍–‍4	Angels; 29‍–‍25	
1964	Angels	12‍–‍6	Angels, 5‍–‍4	Angels, 7‍–‍2	Angels; 41‍–‍31	
1965	Angels	13‍–‍5	Angels, 6‍–‍3	Angels, 7‍–‍2	Angels; 54‍–‍36	The Angels team name was renamed to "California Angels" with a month of the season remaining
1966	Tie	9‍–‍9	Angels, 6‍–‍3	Athletics, 6‍–‍3	Angels; 63‍–‍45	Angels relocate to Anaheim and open Anaheim Stadium
1967	Angels	14‍–‍4	Angels, 9‍–‍0	Angels, 5‍–‍4	Angels; 77‍–‍49	
1968	Athletics	13‍–‍5	Athletics, 6‍–‍3	Athletics, 7‍–‍2	Angels; 82‍–‍62	Athletics relocate to Oakland and play at Oakland-Alameda County Coliseum as the "Oakland Athletics"
1969	Athletics	12‍–‍6	Athletics, 5‍–‍4	Athletics, 7‍–‍2	Angels; 88‍–‍74	

1970s (Athletics, 97–72)

Season	Season series		at California Angels	at Oakland Athletics	Overall series	Notes
1970	Athletics	10‍–‍8	Athletics, 5‍–‍4	Athletics, 5‍–‍4	Angels; 96‍–‍84	The Angels pitcher Clyde Wright threw a no-hitter against the Athletics.
1971	Athletics	11‍–‍7	Athletics, 7‍–‍2	Angels, 5‍–‍4	Angels; 103‍–‍95	
1972	Athletics	10‍–‍8	Athletics, 5‍–‍4	Athletics, 5‍–‍4	Angels; 111‍–‍105	Athletics win 1972 World Series
1973	Athletics	12‍–‍6	Athletics, 7‍–‍2	Athletics, 5‍–‍4	Tie; 117‍–‍117	Athletics win 1973 World Series
1974	Athletics	12‍–‍6	Athletics, 5‍–‍4	Athletics, 7‍–‍2	Athletics; 129‍–‍123	Athletics win 1974 World Series; Athletics take a 121‍–‍120 lead on June 24 in the series, a lead they would never relinquish.
1975	Athletics	11‍–‍7	Athletics, 5‍–‍4	Athletics, 6‍–‍3	Athletics; 140‍–‍130	
1976	Athletics	12‍–‍6	Athletics, 6‍–‍3	Athletics, 6‍–‍3	Athletics; 152‍–‍136	
1977	Athletics	10‍–‍5	Tie, 4‍–‍4	Athletics, 6‍–‍1	Athletics; 162‍–‍141	AL expansion reduces the season series to 15 meetings per year. Athletics win ten straight season series.
1978	Angels	9‍–‍6	Angels, 4‍–‍3	Angels, 5‍–‍3	Athletics; 168‍–‍150	
1979	Angels	10‍–‍3	Angels, 5‍–‍2	Angels, 5‍–‍1	Athletics; 171‍–‍160	

1980s (Athletics, 70–57)

Season	Season series		at California Angels	at Oakland Athletics	Overall series	Notes
1980	Athletics	10‍–‍3	Athletics, 4‍–‍2	Athletics, 6‍–‍1	Athletics; 181‍–‍163	
1981	Athletics	8‍–‍2	Athletics, 4‍–‍0	Athletics, 4‍–‍2	Athletics; 189‍–‍165	Strike-shortened season
1982	Angels	9‍–‍4	Angels, 5‍–‍1	Angels, 4‍–‍3	Athletics; 193‍–‍174	
1983	Athletics	8‍–‍5	Athletics, 4‍–‍3	Athletics, 4‍–‍2	Athletics; 201‍–‍179	
1984	Angels	7‍–‍6	Athletics, 4‍–‍2	Angels, 5‍–‍2	Athletics; 207‍–‍186	
1985	Athletics	7‍–‍6	Angels, 4‍–‍3	Athletics, 4‍–‍2	Athletics; 214‍–‍192	
1986	Angels	10‍–‍3	Angels, 5‍–‍1	Angels, 5‍–‍2	Athletics; 217‍–‍202	
1987	Athletics	7‍–‍6	Athletics, 5‍–‍2	Angels, 4‍–‍2	Athletics; 224‍–‍208	
1988	Athletics	9‍–‍4	Tie, 3‍–‍3	Athletics, 6‍–‍1	Athletics; 233‍–‍212	Athletics lose 1988 World Series
1989	Athletics	8‍–‍5	Athletics, 4‍–‍3	Athletics, 4‍–‍2	Athletics; 241‍–‍217	Athletics win 1989 World Series

1990s (Athletics, 68–55)

Season	Season series		at California/Anaheim Angels	at Oakland Athletics	Overall series	Notes
1990	Athletics	9‍–‍4	Athletics, 5‍–‍1	Athletics, 4‍–‍3	Athletics; 250‍–‍221	Athletics lose 1990 World Series
1991	Athletics	12‍–‍1	Athletics, 6‍–‍1	Athletics, 6‍–‍0	Athletics; 262‍–‍222	
1992	Athletics	8‍–‍5	Tie, 3‍–‍3	Athletics, 5‍–‍2	Athletics; 270‍–‍227	
1993	Athletics	7‍–‍6	Angels, 4‍–‍3	Athletics, 4‍–‍2	Athletics; 277‍–‍233	
1994	Athletics	6‍–‍3	Tie, 3‍–‍3	Athletics, 3‍–‍0	Athletics; 283‍–‍236	Strike-shortened season. Strike cancels postseason.
1995	Athletics	7‍–‍6	Angels, 5‍–‍2	Athletics, 5‍–‍1	Athletics; 290‍–‍242	
1996	Athletics	7‍–‍6	Athletics, 4‍–‍2	Angels, 4‍–‍3	Athletics; 297‍–‍248	Athletics win ten straight season series.
1997	Angels	11‍–‍1	Angels, 5‍–‍1	Angels, 6‍–‍0	Athletics; 298‍–‍259	The Angels team name was renamed to "Anaheim Angels." Angels win 12 straight meetings and 7 straight away meetings (1996‍–‍97)
1998	Athletics	7‍–‍5	Tie, 3‍–‍3	Athletics, 4‍–‍2	Athletics; 305‍–‍264	
1999	Angels	8‍–‍4	Angels, 5‍–‍1	Tie, 3‍–‍3	Athletics; 309‍–‍272	

2000s (Athletics, 97–90)

Season	Season series		at Anaheim Angels/ Los Angeles Angels of Anaheim	at Oakland Athletics	Overall series	Notes
2000	Athletics	8‍–‍5	Tie, 3‍–‍3	Athletics, 5‍–‍2	Athletics; 317‍–‍277	
2001	Athletics	14‍–‍6	Athletics, 7‍–‍3	Athletics, 7‍–‍3	Athletics; 331‍–‍283	MLB changed to an unbalanced schedule in 2001, resulting in 19-20 meetings per year.
2002	Athletics	11‍–‍9	Angels, 6‍–‍4	Athletics, 7‍–‍3	Athletics; 342‍–‍292	The first season in which both teams qualify for playoffs. Angels win 2002 World Series
2003	Athletics	12‍–‍8	Tie, 5‍–‍5	Athletics, 7‍–‍3	Athletics; 354‍–‍300	
2004	Angels	10‍–‍9	Tie, 5‍–‍5	Angels, 5‍–‍4	Athletics; 363‍–‍310	Both teams met in the final series of the season in Oakland and tied for first place in the AL West; the Angels won two of three games to win the division.
2005	Angels	10‍–‍9	Angels, 5‍–‍4	Tie, 5‍–‍5	Athletics; 372‍–‍320	The Angels team name was renamed to "Los Angeles Angels of Anaheim."
2006	Angels	11‍–‍8	Athletics, 5‍–‍4	Angels, 7‍–‍3	Athletics; 380‍–‍331	John Lackey/Jason Kendall brawl
2007	Athletics	10‍–‍9	Tie, 5‍–‍5	Athletics, 5‍–‍4	Athletics; 390‍–‍340	
2008	Angels	10‍–‍9	Tie, 5‍–‍5	Angels, 5‍–‍4	Athletics; 399‍–‍350	
2009	Angels	12‍–‍7	Athletics, 6‍–‍4	Angels, 8‍–‍1	Athletics; 406‍–‍362	

2010s (Angels, 97–93)

Season	Season series		at Los Angeles Angels (of Anaheim)	at Oakland Athletics	Overall series	Notes
2010	Angels	11‍–‍8	Angels, 7‍–‍2	Athletics, 6‍–‍4	Athletics; 414‍–‍373	
2011	Athletics	11‍–‍8	Tie, 5‍–‍5	Athletics, 6‍–‍3	Athletics; 425‍–‍381	
2012	Athletics	10‍–‍9	Athletics, 7‍–‍3	Angels, 6‍–‍3	Athletics; 435‍–‍390	
2013	Athletics	11‍–‍8	Athletics, 5‍–‍4	Athletics, 6‍–‍4	Athletics; 446‍–‍398	On April 29, the teams played a 19-ining game that lasted 6 hours, 32 minutes, the longest game by time in Athletics history. The Athletics won the game on a Brandon Moss walk-off home run.
2014	Angels	10‍–‍9	Angels, 7‍–‍3	Athletics, 6‍–‍3	Athletics; 455‍–‍408	
2015	Angels	11‍–‍8	Angels, 6‍–‍4	Angels, 5‍–‍4	Athletics; 463‍–‍419	
2016	Angels	12‍–‍7	Angels, 6‍–‍4	Angels, 6‍–‍3	Athletics; 470‍–‍431	The Angels team name was reverted to "Los Angeles Angels."
2017	Angels	12‍–‍7	Angels, 7‍–‍2	Tie, 5‍–‍5	Athletics; 477‍–‍443	
2018	Angels	10‍–‍9	Angels, 5‍–‍4	Tie, 5‍–‍5	Athletics; 486‍–‍453	
2019	Athletics	13‍–‍6	Athletics, 6‍–‍3	Athletics, 7‍–‍3	Athletics; 499‍–‍459	

2020s (Athletics, 54–46)

Season	Season series		at Los Angeles Angels	at (Oakland) Athletics	Overall series	Notes
2020	Athletics	6‍–‍4	Angels, 2‍–‍1	Athletics, 5‍–‍2	Athletics; 505‍–‍463	Season shortened to 60 games (with 10 meetings) due to COVID-19 pandemic.
2021	Athletics	15‍–‍4	Athletics, 8‍–‍2	Athletics, 7‍–‍2	Athletics; 520‍–‍467	
2022	Angels	12‍–‍7	Angels, 6‍–‍3	Angels, 6‍–‍4	Athletics; 527‍–‍479	
2023	Angels	7‍–‍6	Angels, 5‍–‍2	Athletics, 4‍–‍2	Athletics; 533‍–‍486	Schedule structure modified this season to allow every team to play one series against every interleague team. Shortening meetings from 19 to 13 games.
2024	Athletics	8‍–‍5	Angels, 4‍–‍3	Athletics, 5‍–‍1	Athletics; 541‍–‍491	
2025	Angels	9‍–‍4	Angels, 4‍–‍2	Angels, 5‍–‍2	Athletics; 545‍–‍500	Athletics move to West Sacramento, California and only keep the franchise name, "Athletics".
2026	Athletics	8‍–‍5	Athletics, 4‍–‍3	Athletics, 4‍–‍2	Athletics; 553‍–‍505	
2027	Tie	0‍–‍0	Upcoming at Angels, May 14‍–‍16, July 22‍–‍25	Upcoming at Athletics, May 7‍–‍9, August 13‍–‍15	Athletics; 553‍–‍503	

Summary of Results

Season	Season series		at Los Angeles Angels	at Athletics	Notes
California / Los Angeles Angels vs. Kansas City Athletics	Angels	77‍–‍49	Angels, 42‍–‍21	Angels, 35‍–‍28	
Los Angeles / Anaheim / California Angels vs. Oakland Athletics	Athletics	492‍–‍414	Athletics, 232‍–‍221	Athletics, 260‍–‍193	
Los Angeles Angels vs. Athletics	Angels	14‍–‍12	Angels, 7‍–‍6	Angels, 7‍–‍6	Athletics move to West Sacramento, California and only keep the franchise name, "Athletics".
Overall Regular season games	Athletics	553‍–‍505	Angels, 270‍–‍259	Athletics, 294‍–‍235	

== See also ==
- Dodgers–Giants rivalry
- 49ers–Rams rivalry
- Lakers–Warriors rivalry
- Chargers–Raiders rivalry
- Kings–Sharks rivalry
- California Clásico
