= 49ers–Rams rivalry =

National Football League cross-state rivalry in California

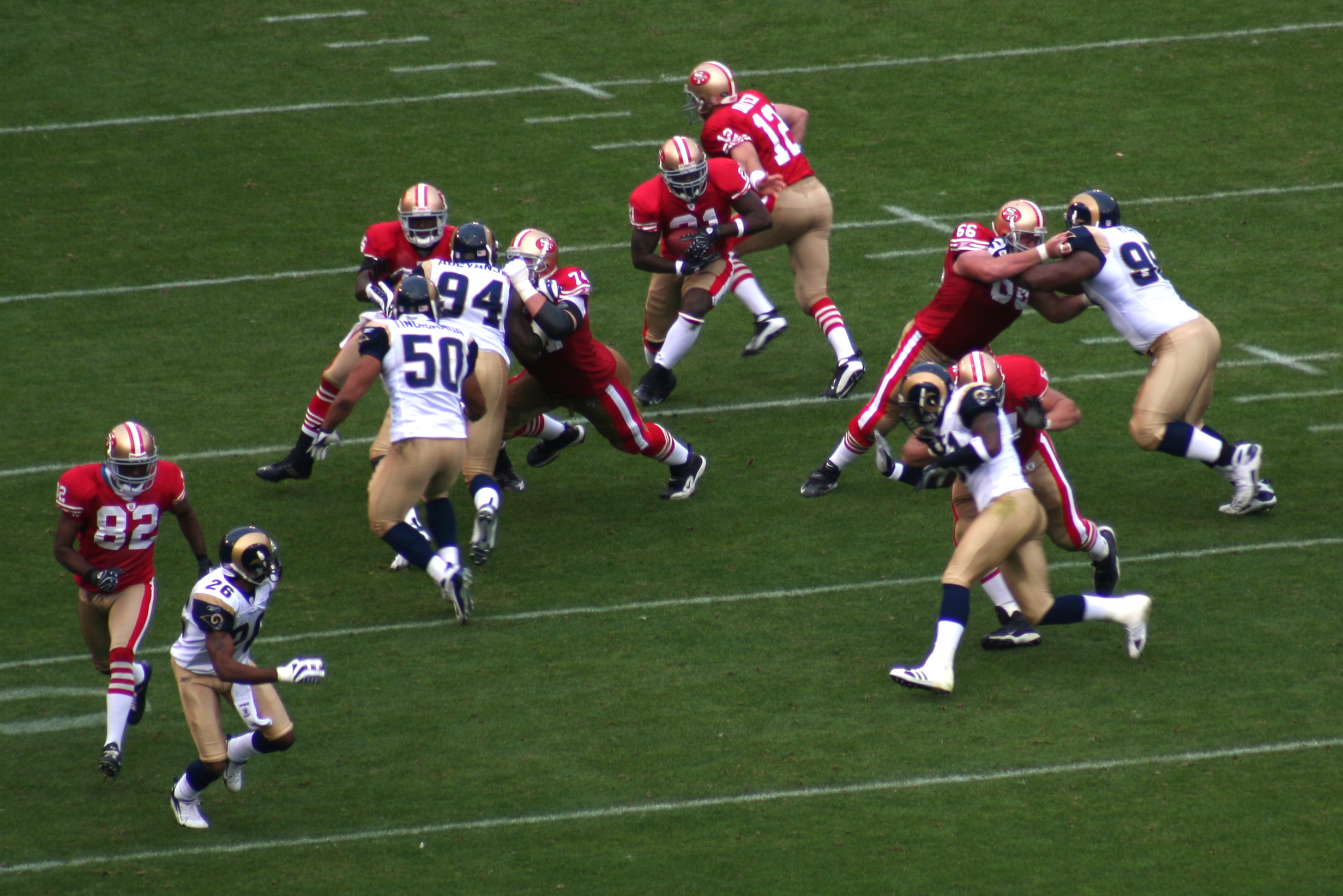
- 49ers and Rams face off during the 2007 season.

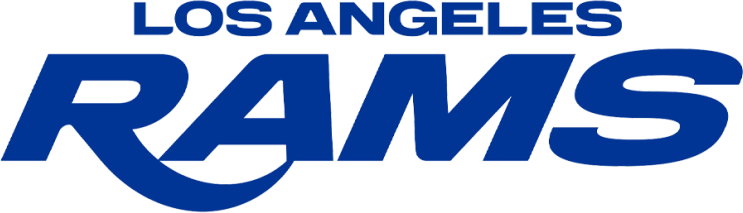
- San Francisco 49ers Los Angeles Rams
- Location: San Francisco, Los Angeles
- First meeting: October 1, 1950; Rams 35, 49ers 14
- Latest meeting: September 10, 2026; 49ers 27, Rams 7
- Next meeting: December 13, 2026
- Stadiums: 49ers: Levi's Stadium; Rams: SoFi Stadium

Statistics
- Total meetings: 155
- All-time series: 49ers: 80–72–3
- Regular season series: 49ers: 79–71–3
- Postseason results: Tie: 1–1
- Largest victory: 49ers: 48–0 (1987); Rams: 56–7 (1958)
- Most points scored: 49ers: 48 (1987); Rams: 56 (1958)
- Longest win streak: 49ers: 17 (1990–1998); Rams: 10 (1970–1975)
- Current win streak: 49ers: 1 (2026–present)

Post–season history
- 1989 NFC Championship: 49ers won: 30–3; 2021 NFC Championship: Rams won: 20–17

The 49ers–Rams rivalry is a National Football League (NFL) rivalry between the San Francisco 49ers and Los Angeles Rams.

The rivalry began in 1950 and became one of the most intense in the NFL in the 1970s as the two California based teams regularly competed for the NFC West Division title. During the mid-2010s and 2020s, the rivalry returned to the same intensity following the Rams’ return to Los Angeles and subsequent playoff success. Geography plays a strong role in animosity between the two teams as Northern California (where the 49ers are based) and Southern California (where the Rams are based) have long been competitors in the economic, cultural, and political arenas. Similarly to the Dodgers–Giants rivalry equivalent in baseball, the Kings–Sharks rivalry equivalent in hockey, the Lakers–Warriors rivalry equivalent in basketball, and the California Clásico equivalent in soccer, animosity between the two has led to acts of violence or public disdain between fans, players, or coaches alike.

During the Rams' 20-season tenure in St. Louis, the rivalry did not have the geographical lore it once had, but the games were still intense regardless of the standings. The rivalry again became geographic with the Rams’ return to Los Angeles in 2016. Sports Illustrated considers their rivalry the 8th best of all time in the NFL. The 49ers and Rams are also the only two teams who have been a part of the NFC West since it was formed in 1970. The Rams, who dominated much of the first 30 years of the rivalry, led the series by as many as 22 games in 1980, but the 49ers' strong play in the 1980s and 1990s, including a 17–game winning streak from 1990–1998 allowed them to take the lead.

The 49ers lead the overall series, 80–72–3. The two teams have met twice in the playoffs, winning one each.

== History ==
In 1950, the National Football League merged with the All-America Football Conference thus gaining three new teams. One of these teams was the San Francisco 49ers making them the second NFL franchise located on the West Coast, the first one being the Los Angeles Rams who had re-located from Cleveland in 1946. The NFL placed both of them in the newly formed National Conference (1950–52) guaranteeing that they would play each other twice during the regular season. In 1953, the National Conference was renamed the Western Conference and the American Conference was renamed the Eastern Conference which remained in place until the AFL merger forced re-alignment in 1970. For the 1967, 1968, and 1969 seasons immediately preceding the 1970 re-alignment, now with 16 franchises, the NFL divided the Western and Eastern Conferences into two Divisions of four teams each, ironically very similar to the present-day conferences resulting from the 2002 re-alignment. The 49ers and Rams remained together in the Coastal Division of the Western Conference (1967–1969) and then in the NFC West Division since 1970. Owing to the strength of their rivalry, the 49ers and Rams have remained in place as the only two teams in the NFC West Division continuously since 1970, despite the Rams' re-location to Saint Louis in 1995 and further re-alignment in 2002. They have met twice every season beginning in 1950. The teams have met twice in the NFL Playoffs. Their first postseason meeting was in the NFC Championship Game following the 1989 season at Candlestick Park in San Francisco. This resulted in a 30–3 victory by the 49ers on January 14, 1990, immediately preceding their fourth Super Bowl appearance. On January 30, 2022, they would again meet in the NFC Championship Game at Los Angeles' Sofi Stadium where the Rams would break a six-game losing skid to the 49ers, winning 20–17 en route a victory in Super Bowl LVI.

=== 1950s ===
The first meeting between the teams took place on October 1, 1950, in San Francisco. The Rams were alternating starting quarterbacks between Bob Waterfield and Norm Van Brocklin during the 1950 season. Waterfield was the starter for the game, but during the second quarter, San Francisco's Pete Wissman landed a hard tackle on the Los Angeles quarterback. Van Brocklin filled in for Waterfield, and the Rams won the game 35–14. The two teams played each other again on November 5, 1950, at the Los Angeles Memorial Coliseum in Los Angeles. After beating the Baltimore Colts 70–21 and the Detroit Lions 65–24, the Rams were favored to beat the 49ers by 20 points. Yet, the 49ers played a very physical game and only lost by a touchdown holding the Rams' offensive powerhouse to only 28 points.

The 49ers got their first win against the Rams on October 28, 1951. The 49ers secondary was able to pick off Van Brocklin six times, more than half of the interceptions that he threw all season. The 49ers held the Rams to just 17 points, the lowest they put up all season, and were able to capitalize on the turnovers en route to a 44–17 victory.

=== 1960s ===
The rivalry was almost even through the decade, with the Rams holding a 10-9-1 edge. The 49ers were also run throughout the 1960s, while the Rams did not contend until the arrival of coach George Allen in 1966. In 1967, the 49ers and Rams were placed in the Coastal Division of the NFL's Western Conference with the Atlanta Falcons (who remained a rival in the NFC West through 2001) and Baltimore Colts.

=== 1970s ===
After the AFL-NFL merger, both teams were placed in the NFC West and were the only teams required to be in the same division by the merger agreement. The rivalry was at its pinnacle during the 1970s. From 1970 to 1979 one of the two teams won the division each season. The decade also featured 10 and 8-game win streaks by the Rams (the 8-game streak stretched into the early 1980s). The 49ers were the NFC West's top team in the beginning of the decade winning the first three post-merger division crowns despite going 1–5 in that period vs. the Rams. The Rams answered right back winning seven straight division crowns from 1973 to 1979, culminating with Super Bowl XIV loss to the Pittsburgh Steelers.

=== 1980s ===
On January 2, 1983, a 1–7 Rams team met the 3–5 defending Super Bowl champion 49ers in San Francisco for the last game of the 1982 season (a players' strike shortened the season to 9 games), with the 49ers needing a win to make the playoffs. The Rams led late in the 4th quarter 21–20 until 49ers quarterback Joe Montana led a two-minute drive, putting the 49ers in position for a short field goal. But Ivory Sully blocked Ray Wersching's kick to preserve a 21–20 win and knock the 49ers out of the playoffs.

On January 14, 1990, the two teams met in the 1989 NFC Championship game. The Rams were heavy underdogs but had already pulled off two upsets on the road in the playoffs (over the Eagles and Giants). The Rams took an early 3–0 lead and were driving again, but Rams quarterback Jim Everett noticed a wide-open Flipper Anderson a second too late, and the pass was knocked away by 49ers safety Ronnie Lott. Instead of a 10–0 Rams lead, Montana led the 49ers on a touchdown drive and San Francisco took the lead 7–3. The 49ers would win the game, 30–3.

=== 1990s ===
The 49ers dominated the rivalry during the 1990s, winning 17 straight games against the Rams. They also won their fifth Super Bowl in 1994. After nearly fifty years, it seemed like the rivalry was coming to an end when the Rams relocated to St. Louis in 1995. Yet, some players did not believe so. Roger Craig stated in Tales from the San Francisco 49ers Sideline that "the Rams will always be the 49ers' biggest rival. It doesn't matter if they no longer play in Los Angeles. If the Rams played their home games on Mars, it would still be a rivalry."

By the end of the 1998 season, San Francisco led in the all-time series (49–48–2) for the first time ever. The Rams previously led in the series by as many as 22 games in 1980. The 49ers' lead in the series was short-lived, however, as St. Louis won both games against San Francisco during their championship season in 1999 to retake the lead.

=== 2000s ===
The Rams and their Greatest Show on Turf offense (1999–2001) regained the upper hand against San Francisco with 6 consecutive regular-season victories against them in that period right after having previously dropped 17 straight games including one playoff loss in the 1989 NFC Championship game. Ultimately, in the early 2000s, they went 8–2 against the 49ers from 2000 to 2004. But both teams fell into decline and neither team was a playoff contender as the decade wore on. The 49ers had the upper hand during the latter part of the decade, going 8–2 against St. Louis from 2005 to 2009.

During the 2002 realignment, only the Rams and 49ers would remain in the NFC West, as their former division rivals, the Atlanta Falcons, Carolina Panthers, and New Orleans Saints, would all move to the newly formed NFC South. The Rams and 49ers would be joined by the Arizona Cardinals and Seattle Seahawks in the "new" NFC West.

=== 2010s ===
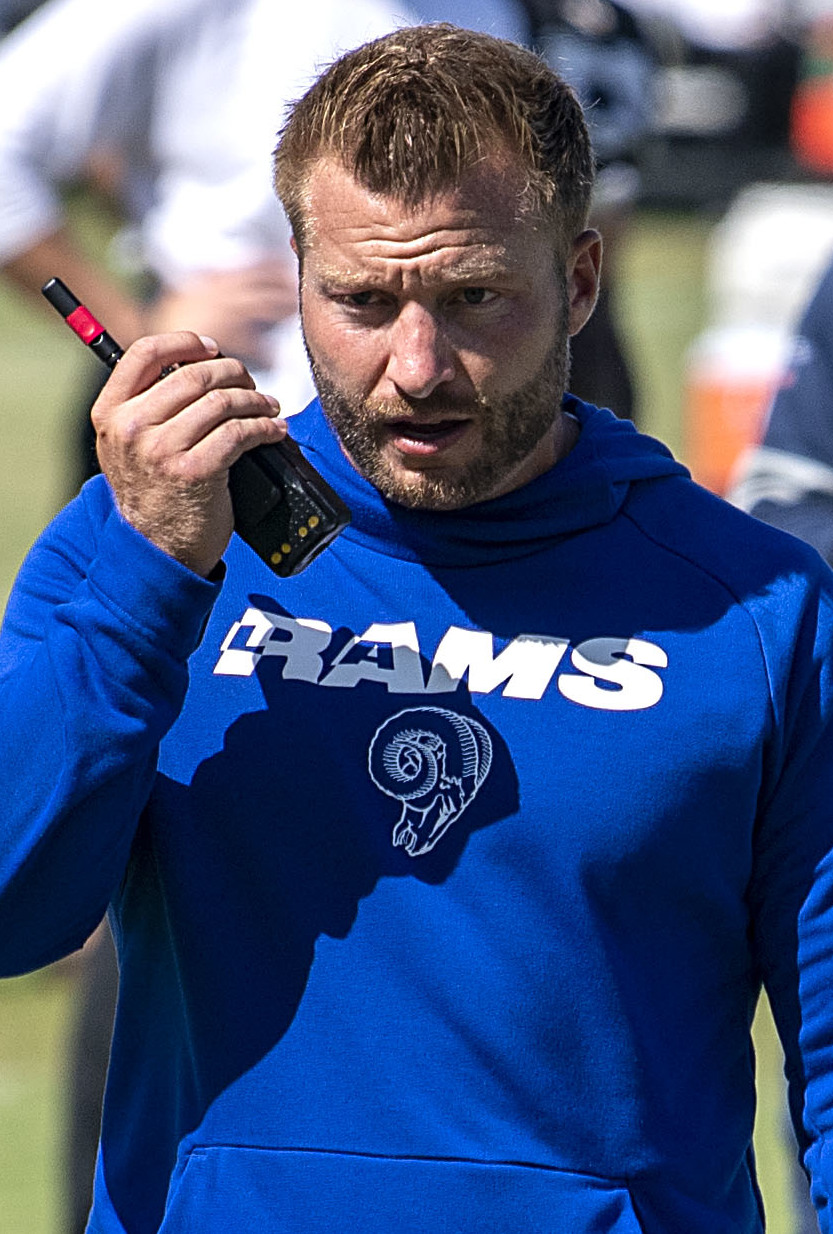
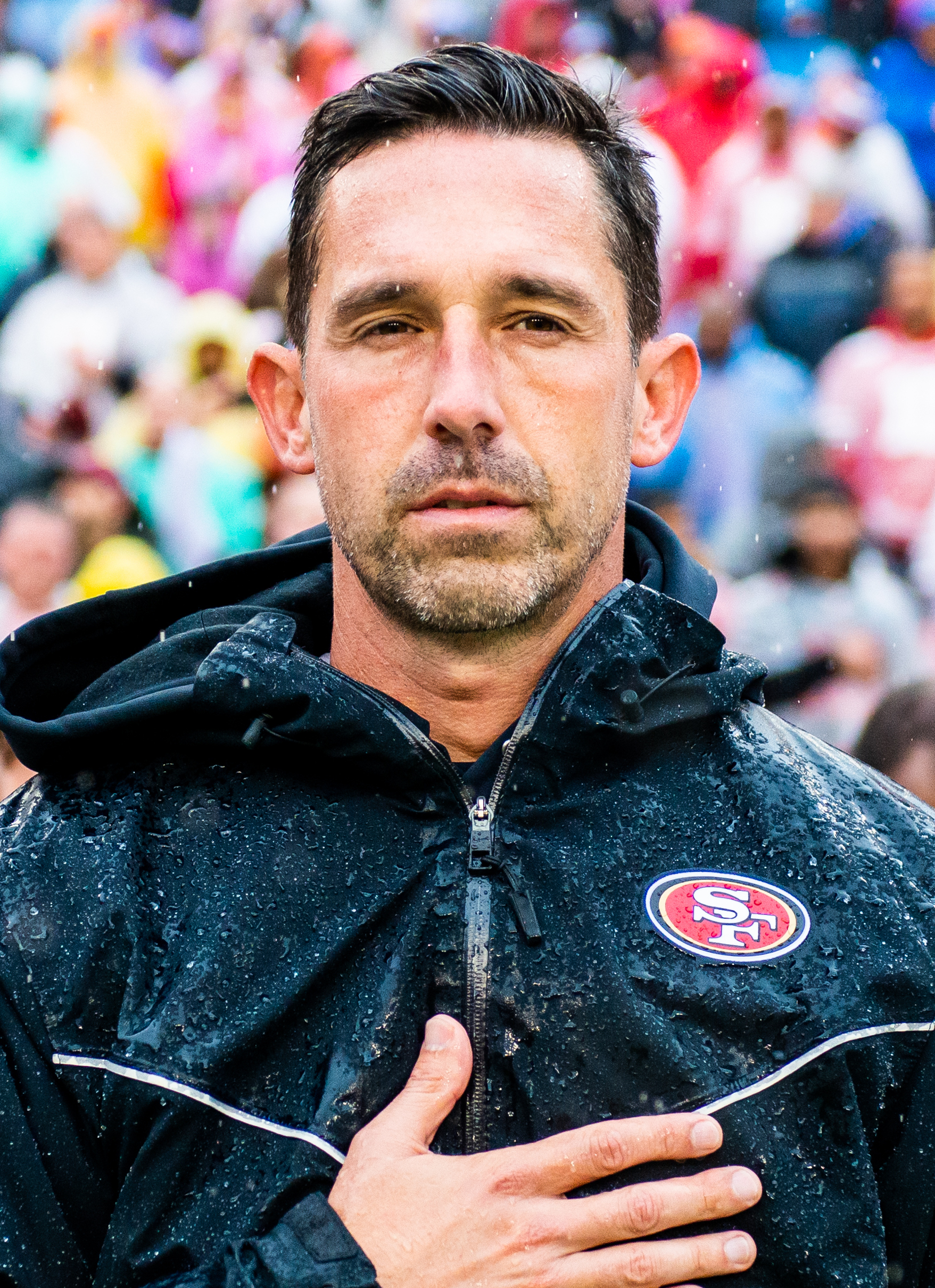
Rams head coach Sean McVay (left) and 49ers head coach Kyle Shanahan (right) have served as the head coaches of the Rams and 49ers, respectively, since 2017 and have led their teams to postseason success and Super Bowl appearances, intensifying the rivalry between the two franchises.

In 2011, the 49ers took the all-time series lead for the first time in 13 years. The Rams tied it back up with a win at Edward Jones Dome in 2012, but then they lost both 2013 games to the 49ers.

In 2016, the Rams returned to Los Angeles, marking a restoration of the Bay Area-Los Angeles rivalry. San Francisco finished 25–16–1 against the Rams during their time in St. Louis.

The Rams were the only team to lose to the 49ers in 2016, as the 49ers swept the two-game series against the Rams but went 0–14 against the rest of the NFL. The two teams won one NFC championship each to close out the decade (Los Angeles in 2018, San Francisco in 2019), but neither team won the Super Bowl. In 2019, the second 49ers–Rams game was in Week 15; the Rams held an early 21–10 lead, but the 49ers came back, defeating Los Angeles 34–31 to knock the Rams out of playoff contention.

=== 2020s ===
The 49ers swept the Rams for the second straight season in 2020, winning 24–16 on Sunday Night Football in Week 6, followed by a 23–20 victory in Week 12. It was the Rams' first-ever loss in their new venue SoFi Stadium (colloquial nicknamed Levi's South). In 2021, the 49ers again won both head-to-head meetings. This included the regular season finale in Los Angeles, which had playoff implications for both sides. The Rams were already in the playoffs but could clinch the NFC West title with a win, while the 49ers needed a win to make it into the playoffs. The Rams held a 17–0 lead late in the second quarter, but the 49ers came back to win 27–24 in overtime, clinching a playoff spot. Ultimately, the Rams won the NFC West anyway as the Arizona Cardinals lost their final game.

On January 30, 2022, the 49ers and Rams met in Los Angeles and competed against each other in the NFC Championship Game for the right to represent the NFC in Super Bowl LVI. Despite losing six consecutive regular-season matchups against the 49ers and facing a 10-point deficit heading into the fourth quarter, McVay's Rams came back to defeat San Francisco 20–17. After finally defeating their rival, the Rams ultimately went on to win Super Bowl LVI over the Cincinnati Bengals.

On September 22, 2024, the 1–1 49ers and 0–2 Rams met at SoFi Stadium. Heading into the game, both teams were dealing with significant injuries to key offensive players, as San Francisco was without Deebo Samuel, George Kittle, and Christian McCaffrey, while Los Angeles was without top receivers Puka Nacua and Cooper Kupp. Despite the injuries, the heavily favored 49ers scored touchdowns on their first two drives and maintained a 14-point lead deep into the third quarter against their desperate rival. With just under three minutes remaining in regulation, the 49ers still led by seven points with possession of the ball, but kicker Jake Moody missed a long field goal that would have effectively ended the game if successful. The Rams scored a quick touchdown on the ensuing drive and forced San Francisco to punt on the drive after that. Undrafted return man Xavier Smith (who was making his NFL debut) generated a lengthy return to midfield to give Los Angeles great field position, and a defensive penalty on San Francisco allowed Rams kicker Joshua Karty to kick the game-winning field goal and complete the comeback. The victory revived the Rams' season, as they would climb out of an early-season hole and win the NFC West for the first time since 2021.

== Team reactions ==
- Following the Rams' relocation to St. Louis in 1995, during a Week 8 blowout loss to the 49ers, lineman Ken Norton Jr and defensive tackle Dana Stubblefield were seen giving remarks on the team's poor play following the move, exclaiming to the cameras; "Same old Rams? nope Same old Sorry ass Rams!".
- Before a week 4 matchup during the 1999 season, the Rams were set to face the 49ers in St. Louis. The 49ers had beaten the Rams in 17 straight matchups, including every home matchup dating back to the 1986 season. Before the game, Rams' receiver Torry Holt expressed to fellow receiver Isaac Bruce "I want nothing more than to beat them, I fucking hate them". The Rams went on to crush the 49ers 42–20. Motivated by the rivalry, Bruce would record 134 receiving yards and four touchdowns, and the Rams' offense would score 21 points in the opening quarter out of sheer fury at the 49ers. Warner would throw for 323 yards as the Rams scored on all but two possessions while the Rams dominated San Francisco for the entirety of the game.
- After the Rams returned to Los Angeles for the 2016 season; their first regular season game came against the 49ers in Santa Clara. The Rams were eventually shut out by the 49ers 28–0 in a disappointing Monday Night matchup. Tensions ran high following several controversial scramble plays from 49ers quarterback Blaine Gabbert. Aaron Donald punched Gabbert in the jaw out of anger. The punch knocked the helmet off of Gabbert's head while unintentionally hitting a referee beside him. Rams lineman Alec Ogletree would also kick Gabbert onto the turf in frustration with the call. 49ers offensive lineman Quinten Patton later shoved Donald after his punch was thrown at Gabbert. Donald was ejected for his punch accidentally hitting the official, though Ogletree was not penalized for the hit on Gabbert.
- During the Week 6 matchup in Los Angeles, 49ers' defensive coordinator Robert Saleh began screaming insults at the Rams sideline following a critical sack on Jared Goff to secure the victory. Saleh would later express embarrassment at the gesture and apologized to Sean McVay during an appearance on his podcast with Packers head coach Matt LaFleur.
- During the Rams' Monday Night Football matchup against the 49ers in Santa Clara during the 2021 season; Kelly Stafford (wife of Rams' Quarterback Matthew Stafford) was taunted by multiple 49er fans following a controversial hit that forced the Rams to punt during a frustrating upset loss. In retaliation to the insults directed at her husband, Stafford threw a pretzel and a drink at one of the fans. Stafford and her friends were relocated to a different seat section by security, though she later apologized for her actions.
- During a critical Rams home loss to the 49ers during week 18 of the 2021 season, 49ers kicker Robbie Gould engaged in a shouting match with Rams cornerback Jalen Ramsey after the Rams alleged the 49ers had illegally held their defense during the field goal.
- Despite numerous starters being benched for the Rams' 2023 season finale against the 49ers in Santa Clara on January 7; rookie wide receiver Puka Nacua remained active going into the game, looking to set the all-time rookie receiving yards record.
- Following the 49ers' loss in Super Bowl LVIII, Rams' defensive tackle Aaron Donald uploaded a picture on Instagram boasting about his Super Bowl ring from Super Bowl LVI to taunt the 49ers, and possibly Deebo Samuel.

=== Deebo Samuel incidents ===
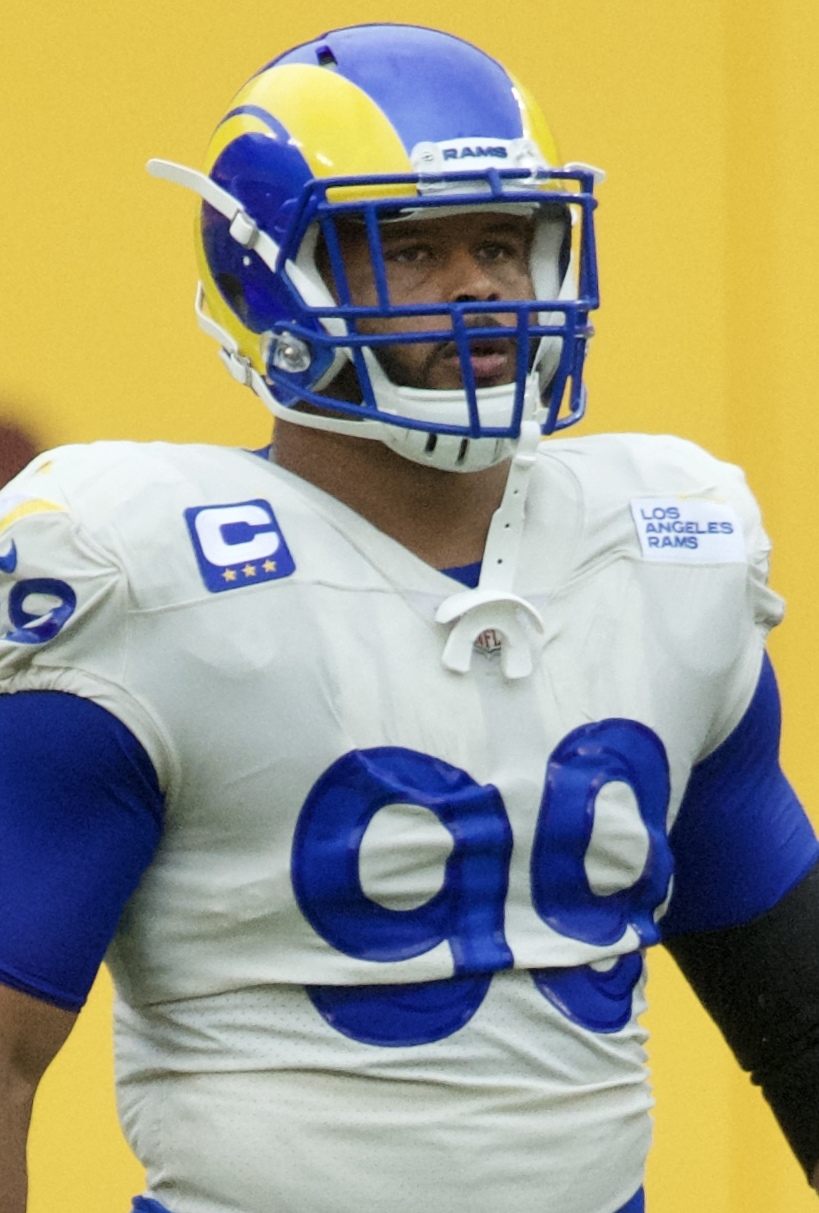
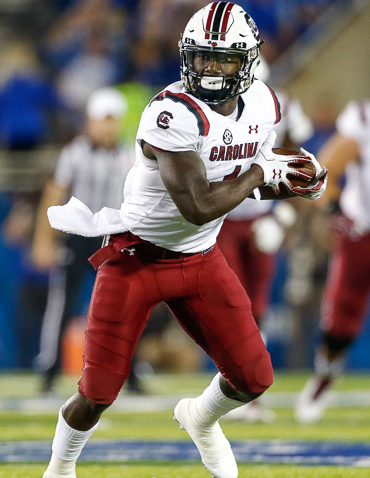
Rams' former star Aaron Donald and the 49ers' Deebo Samuel have engaged in a public verbal feud over the years.

In 2019, 49ers' wide receiver Deebo Samuel developed a controversial notoriety for his public feud with the Rams, most notably Los Angeles' former star-defensive tackle Aaron Donald. Following a 2019 home loss against the 49ers in Week 6, Donald was asked about his opinion of Samuel; responding "I don't know who that is". Samuel took to multiple media outlets to attack Donald in the games that followed, claiming: "I don't see how he wouldn't know who I am 'cause he should by now". Samuel would continue to insult the Rams over Twitter during the 49ers' then-ongoing 6-game win streak over Los Angeles. The two teams later met in the 2021-22 NFC Championship Game, culminating in a heated battle between the two. Rams' safety Nick Scott sought retribution for Samuel's previous comments, culminating in Scott violently charging at Samuel with a fierce blindside hit, knocking Samuel to the ground. Samuel was briefly taken out of play by medical staff, however; Scott was not penalized for the hit. Following the Rams' victory in the NFC Championship, Samuel was later seen crying on the sideline, though Rams' receiver Odell Beckham Jr. walked over to comfort him before Samuel covered his face with a towel and walked into the locker room sobbing. Following the victory, Aaron Donald was again asked about his feud with Samuel, responding humorously "who is that again?". Following a Rams loss to the 49ers in Santa Clara on Monday Night Football during the 2022 season, Samuel uploaded a video to Twitter taunting cornerback Jalen Ramsey for failing to cover him during a play. Ramsey and numerous players later mocked Samuel's gesture, explaining that he was assigned to cover Brandon Aiyuk instead. Samuel's comments against the Rams persisted during their season opener on September 17, 2023, against the 49ers. Prior to halftime, Samuel instigated an on-field altercation with Rams' cornerback Derion Kendrick, but was bizarrely interrupted when a 49ers fan jumped onto the field into the melee and began attacking Kendrick until the fan was removed by stadium security. Samuel later jokingly praised the fan's misconduct during his postgame interview to further taunt Kendrick. While in attendance at the 2024 Pro Bowl Games, a 49ers fan in attendance later demanded an autograph from Rams' rookie receiver Puka Nacua. Nacua had taken notice of the fan passing him a Deebo Samuel jersey and jokingly pretended to sign the fan's jersey before tossing it back into the stands as a subtle insult at Samuel for his previous comments.

== Fan reactions ==
Due to the intensity brought on by the rivalry following the Rams’ return to Los Angeles, multiple incidents have occurred between rival fans. Similarly to the Dodgers–Giants rivalry of the MLB, the two cities have harbored much animosity towards each other due to the cultural and economic differences across the state. Rams fans often refer to the 49ers as the “Whiners” due to the perception of their fans and players complaining about the referees and blaming external factors for their losses in both the regular season and playoffs. 49ers fans in turn often refer to the Rams as the “Lambs” due to the team's perceived weakness and lack of championship titles through the 1980s and mid-2000s. Both fans also heavily engage in Schadenfreude, especially during the Super Bowl when either team is playing.

As a result of the Rams' absence for 20 seasons and the success of the 49ers during the 1980s and early 1990s, many 49ers fans often attempt to overtake Rams home games against San Francisco. The Rams have seen a recent resurgence in fan support following recent playoff success in the late 2010s. Despite the regrowth of the Rams’ fanbase, the 49ers fanbase often attempt to undermine that of the Rams, given their history within the state; however they regularly devolve into unruly, obnoxious, or violent behavior on numerous occasions. The 2021-22 NFC Championship would see former-Los Angeles Mayor Eric Garcetti and California Governor (former San Francisco Mayor) Gavin Newsom in attendance at SoFi Stadium.

=== Notable incidents ===
- Before a 2013 Week 4 home game in San Francisco, a 15-year-old Rams fan was beaten in the parking lot of Candlestick Park by a 29-year-old 49ers fan, resulting in the teenager suffering a concussion and a broken nose.
- Following the Rams' relocation back to Los Angeles, they suffered an 0–28 loss to the 49ers during their 2016 season opener on September 12, in Santa Clara. Multiple 49ers fans were recorded on cell phone video attacking and beating an unidentified Rams fan. No arrests were made following the incident.
- During a December 2017 home game in Los Angeles, Rams fan Henry Romero was assaulted by a female 49ers fan in addition to several other hostile fans after attempting to take his daughter down towards the field level. The accused attackers were later found to be family members of a 49ers player.
- Leading up to the 2021-22 NFC Championship; Rams management placed a ticket block outside of Southern California to prevent an influx of 49er fans from attending the game due to possible effects on home-field advantage and the likelihood of increased fan violence, though the ban was rescinded 24 hours before the matchup.
- On June 5, 2022, Beverly Hills DJ and 49ers fan Mike Boçek was removed from a tour of SoFi Stadium for obnoxious conduct after multiple fans had recorded Boçek and another 49ers fan vandalizing the Rams’ recent trophy from Super Bowl LVI.
- On October 3, 2022, during a Monday Night Football game in Santa Clara, a 49ers fan ran onto the Rams’ side of the field with a red flare to taunt the players. He was promptly tackled by linebacker Bobby Wagner and removed from the stadium by police officers. The fan later attempted to press charges against Wagner for the tackle but the case was quickly dismissed.
- On September 17, 2023, during the Rams' home opener against the 49ers in Los Angeles; numerous 49er fans engaged in a brawl with a group of Rams fans in the stadium concourse; damaging several kiosks.
- On September 22, 2024, during the Rams' home opener against the 49ers in Los Angeles; an argument between a Rams and a 49ers fan escalated into a brawl in the concourse.

==== Beating of Daniel Luna ====
On January 30, 2022, following the Rams’ victory in the NFC Championship game; Daniel Luna, a 40-year-old 49ers fan and chef from Oakland, California; instigated a physical altercation with several Rams fans in the SoFi Stadium parking lot. Witnesses later reported that Luna was possibly intoxicated and was punched multiple times by a suspect; later identified as 33-year-old Rams fan Bryan Alexis Cifuentes of Los Angeles. Footage showed Luna and multiple 49ers fans surrounding Cifuentes and shoving him whilst he was walking to his car, prompting Cifuentes to throw several punches at Luna. After receiving several blows to the chest and head, Luna fell to the ground; hitting his head on the pavement and knocking him unconscious. Cifuentes later fled the scene, returning to his family. Luna was rushed to UCLA Medical Center in Westwood with non-life-threatening injuries. Although he was hospitalized as a result of his concussion, Luna eventually emerged from his coma on March 9, and filed a lawsuit against the Rams and the city of Inglewood on September 9, 2022, for the incident, citing inadequate security; however, the lawsuit was later dropped per video evidence of Luna's conduct during the incident. Representatives of the 49ers management released a statement expressing their disapproval of both Luna and Cifuentes’ actions in the incident. During the trial, Cifuentes would plead not guilty to the assault and claimed the attack was in self-defense after Luna had allegedly shoved him in the back and punched him in the jaw. The court later dropped the Rams and the city of Inglewood as defendants from the case on August 26, 2023. On December 7th, prosecutors examined surveillance footage; showing that Luna was visibly intoxicated at the time and was turned away from the stadium gates due to not having a ticket. On January 15, 2024, jurors concluded that Luna was intoxicated beyond any reasonable judgement during the incident. The case is currently awaiting a final judgement.

== Season–by–season results ==
San Francisco 49ers vs. St. Louis/Los Angeles Rams Season-by-Season Results
1950s (Rams, 12–7–1)

| Season | Season series | at San Francisco 49ers | at Los Angeles Rams | Overall series | Notes |
|---|---|---|---|---|---|
| 1950 | Rams 2–0 | Rams; 35–14 | Rams; 28–21 | Rams; 2–0 | As a result of the AAFC–NFL merger, the 49ers and Rams were placed in the NFL National Conference (later renamed to the NFL Western Conference), resulting in two meetings annually. |
| 1951 | Tie 1–1 | 49ers 44–17 | Rams; 23–16 | Rams; 3–1 | Rams win 1951 NFL Championship. |
| 1952 | Rams 2–0 | Rams; 34–21 | Rams; 35–9 | Rams; 5–1 | |
| 1953 | 49ers 2–0 | 49ers 31–30 | 49ers 31–27 | Rams; 5–3 | In San Francisco, 49ers overcame a 20–0 deficit. |
| 1954 | Rams 1–0–1 | Rams; 42–34 | Tie; 24–24 | Rams; 6–3–1 | |
| 1955 | Rams 2–0 | Rams; 23–14 | Rams; 27–14 | Rams; 8–3–1 | Rams lose 1955 NFL Championship. |
| 1956 | Tie 1–1 | 49ers 33–30 | Rams; 30–6 | Rams; 9–4–1 | |
| 1957 | Tie 1–1 | 49ers 23–20 | Rams; 37–24 | Rams; 10–5–1 | In Los Angeles, the Rams drew an attendance of 102,368, setting an NFL attendance record (broken in 2005). |
| 1958 | Rams 2–0 | Rams; 33–3 | Rams; 56–7 | Rams; 12–5–1 | In Los Angeles, Rams recorded their largest victory against the 49ers with a 49–point differential, scored their most points in a game against the 49ers, and set a franchise record for their largest victory overall (broken in 1976). Meanwhile, the 49ers set franchise records for their worst loss overall and most points allowed in a game (broken in 1965). |
| 1959 | 49ers 2–0 | 49ers 34–0 | 49ers 24–16 | Rams; 12–7–1 | |

1960s (Rams, 10–9–1)

| Season | Season series | at San Francisco 49ers | at Los Angeles Rams | Overall series | Notes |
|---|---|---|---|---|---|
| 1960 | 49ers 2–0 | 49ers 13–9 | 49ers 23–7 | Rams; 12–9–1 | |
| 1961 | Tie 1–1 | 49ers 35–0 | Rams; 17–7 | Rams; 13–10–1 | |
| 1962 | Tie 1–1 | Rams; 28–14 | 49ers 24–17 | Rams; 14–11–1 | Rams' win was their only win in the 1962 season. |
| 1963 | Rams 2–0 | Rams; 21–17 | Rams; 28–21 | Rams; 16–11–1 | |
| 1964 | Tie 1–1 | 49ers 28–7 | Rams; 42–14 | Rams; 17–12–1 | |
| 1965 | 49ers 2–0 | 49ers 30–27 | 49ers 45–21 | Rams; 17–14–1 | In San Francisco, 49ers overcame a 27–13 fourth-quarter deficit. |
| 1966 | Tie 1–1 | 49ers 21–13 | Rams; 34–3 | Rams; 18–15–1 | |
| 1967 | Tie 1–1 | Rams; 17–7 | 49ers 27–24 | Rams; 19–16–1 | As a result of expansion, the two eight-team divisions became two eight-team conferences split into two divisions, with the 49ers and Rams placed in the NFL Coastal. 49ers' win was the Rams only regular season loss in the 1967 season. |
| 1968 | Rams 1–0–1 | Tie; 20–20 | Rams; 24–10 | Rams; 20–16–2 | |
| 1969 | Rams 2–0 | Rams; 27–21 | Rams; 41–30 | Rams; 22–16–2 | |

1970s (Rams, 17–3)

| Season | Season series | at San Francisco 49ers | at Los Angeles Rams | Overall series | Notes |
|---|---|---|---|---|---|
| 1970 | Tie 1–1 | Rams; 30–13 | 49ers 20–6 | Rams; 23–17–2 | As a result of the AFL–NFL merger, the 49ers and Rams were placed in the NFC West. |
| 1971 | Rams 2–0 | Rams; 20–13 | Rams; 17–6 | Rams; 25–17–2 | 49ers open Candlestick Park. |
| 1972 | Rams 2–0 | Rams; 26–16 | Rams; 31–7 | Rams; 27–17–2 | |
| 1973 | Rams 2–0 | Rams; 40–20 | Rams; 31–13 | Rams; 29–17–2 | |
| 1974 | Rams 2–0 | Rams; 15–13 | Rams; 37–14 | Rams; 31–17–2 | In Los Angeles, Rams' QB James "Shack" Harris finished with a perfect passer rating. |
| 1975 | Tie 1–1 | Rams; 23–14 | 49ers 24–23 | Rams; 32–18–2 | Rams win 10 straight meetings (1970–1975). |
| 1976 | Tie 1–1 | Rams; 23–3 | 49ers 16–0 | Rams; 33–19–2 | |
| 1977 | Rams 2–0 | Rams; 23–10 | Rams; 34–14 | Rams; 35–19–2 | |
| 1978 | Rams 2–0 | Rams; 31–28 | Rams; 27–10 | Rams; 37–19–2 | |
| 1979 | Rams 2–0 | Rams; 26–20 | Rams; 27–24 | Rams; 39–19–2 | Rams lose Super Bowl XIV. |

1980s (49ers, 13–8)

| Season | Season series | at San Francisco 49ers | at Los Angeles Rams | Overall series | Notes |
|---|---|---|---|---|---|
| 1980 | Rams 2–0 | Rams; 31–17 | Rams; 48–26 | Rams; 41–19–2 | Rams move to Anaheim Stadium. Rams win 9 straight meetings (1976–1980) and 12 straight road meetings (1969–1980). |
| 1981 | 49ers 2–0 | 49ers 20–17 | 49ers 33–31 | Rams; 41–21–2 | 49ers' first season series sweep against the Rams since the 1965 season. 49ers win Super Bowl XVI. |
| 1982 | Tie 1–1 | Rams; 21–20 | 49ers 30–24 | Rams; 42–22–2 | Both games were played despite the 1982 NFL players strike reducing the season to 9 games. In San Francisco, the Rams block a potential 49ers' game-winning field goal in the game's final seconds as they get their first and only road win in the 1982 season. |
| 1983 | Tie 1–1 | Rams; 10−7 | 49ers 45−35 | Rams; 43–23–2 | |
| 1984 | 49ers 2–0 | 49ers 19–16 | 49ers 33–0 | Rams; 43–25–2 | 49ers win Super Bowl XIX. |
| 1985 | Tie 1–1 | Rams; 27–20 | 49ers 28–14 | Rams; 44–26–2 | |
| 1986 | Tie 1–1 | 49ers 24–14 | Rams; 16–13 | Rams; 45–27–2 | |
| 1987 | 49ers 2–0 | 49ers 48–0 | 49ers 31–10 | Rams; 45–29–2 | In San Francisco, 49ers recorded their largest victory against the Rams with a 48–point differential, scored their most points in a game against the Rams, and clinched the NFC West and the 1st seed in the NFC with their win. |
| 1988 | Tie 1–1 | Rams; 38–16 | 49ers 24–21 | Rams; 46–30–2 | Both teams finished with 10–6 records along with the New Orleans Saints, but the 49ers clinched the NFC West based on having the best head-to-head record, regulating the Rams to the 5th seed. 49ers win Super Bowl XXIII. |
| 1989 | Tie 1–1 | Rams; 13–12 | 49ers 30–27 | Rams; 47–31–2 | In Los Angeles, 49ers overcame a 27–10 fourth-quarter deficit. Rams' WR John Taylor became the first receiver in NFL history to score 2 touchdowns of 90 yards or longer in the same game. |
| 1989 Playoffs | 49ers 1–0 | 49ers 30–3 | —N/a | Rams; 47–32–2 | NFC Championship Game. 49ers go on to win Super Bowl XXIV. |

1990s (49ers, 17–3)

| Season | Season series | at San Francisco 49ers | at Los Angeles/St. Louis Rams | Overall series | Notes |
|---|---|---|---|---|---|
| 1990 | Tie 1–1 | Rams; 28–17 | 49ers 26–10 | Rams; 48–33–2 | Rams' win snapped the 49ers' 18-game winning streak and handed them their first loss of the season after a 10–0 start. |
| 1991 | 49ers 2–0 | 49ers 27–10 | 49ers 33–10 | Rams; 48–35–2 | |
| 1992 | 49ers 2–0 | 49ers 27–24 | 49ers 27–10 | Rams; 48–37–2 | |
| 1993 | 49ers 2–0 | 49ers 40–17 | 49ers 35–10 | Rams; 48–39–2 | In Los Angeles, 49ers' QB Steve Young threw for 475 yards, setting a franchise record for their most passing yards in a game. |
| 1994 | 49ers 2–0 | 49ers 31–27 | 49ers 34–19 | Rams; 48–41–2 | Last season until the 2016 season the Rams played as a Los Angeles-based team. 49ers win Super Bowl XXIX. |
| 1995 | 49ers 2–0 | 49ers 41–13 | 49ers 44–10 | Rams; 48–43–2 | Rams relocate to St. Louis and initial play at Busch Memorial Stadium. The game in St. Louis was their last game at Busch Memorial Stadium before opening and moving to Trans World Dome (now known as The Dome at America's Center). |
| 1996 | 49ers 2–0 | 49ers 34–0 | 49ers 28–11 | Rams; 48–45–2 | |
| 1997 | 49ers 2–0 | 49ers 30–10 | 49ers 15–12 | Rams; 48–47–2 | |
| 1998 | 49ers 2–0 | 49ers 38–19 | 49ers 28–10 | 49ers 49–48–2 | 49ers won 17 straight meetings (1990–1998) and 12 straight road meetings (1987–1998). 49ers take the lead in the overall series record. |
| 1999 | Rams 2–0 | Rams; 23–7 | Rams; 42–20 | Rams; 50–49–2 | Rams' first season series sweep against the 49ers since the 1980 season. Rams win Super Bowl XXXIV. |

2000s (Tie, 10–10)

| Season | Season series | at San Francisco 49ers | at St. Louis Rams | Overall series | Notes |
|---|---|---|---|---|---|
| 2000 | Rams 2–0 | Rams; 34–24 | Rams; 41–24 | Rams; 52–49–2 | |
| 2001 | Rams 2–0 | Rams; 30–26 | Rams; 27–14 | Rams; 54–49–2 | Rams lose Super Bowl XXXVI. |
| 2002 | Tie 1–1 | 49ers 37–13 | Rams; 31–20 | Rams; 55–50–2 | In St. Louis, Rams overcame a 20–3 fourth-quarter deficit. Both teams split the season series for the first time since the 1990 season. |
| 2003 | Tie 1–1 | 49ers 30–10 | Rams; 27–24 (OT) | Rams; 56–51–2 | First overtime result in the series. |
| 2004 | Rams 2–0 | Rams; 24–14 | Rams; 16–6 | Rams; 58–51–2 | |
| 2005 | 49ers 2–0 | 49ers 28–25 | 49ers 24–20 | Rams; 58–53–2 | |
| 2006 | Tie 1–1 | 49ers 20–13 | Rams; 20–17 | Rams; 59–54–2 | |
| 2007 | Tie 1–1 | Rams; 13–9 | 49ers 17–16 | Rams; 60–55–2 | |
| 2008 | 49ers 2–0 | 49ers 35–16 | 49ers 17–16 | Rams; 60–57–2 | In St. Louis, 49ers overcame a 16–3 fourth-quarter deficit. |
| 2009 | 49ers 2–0 | 49ers 35–0 | 49ers 28–6 | Rams; 60–59–2 | |

2010s (49ers, 12–7–1)

| Season | Season series | at San Francisco 49ers | at St. Louis/Los Angeles Rams | Overall series | Notes |
|---|---|---|---|---|---|
| 2010 | Tie 1–1 | 49ers 23–20 (OT) | Rams; 25–17 | Rams; 61–60–2 | |
| 2011 | 49ers 2–0 | 49ers 26–0 | 49ers 34–27 | 49ers 62–61–2 | |
| 2012 | Rams 1–0–1 | Tie; 24–24 (OT) | Rams; 16–13 (OT) | Tie; 62–62–3 | In San Francisco, Rams had what would have been a game-winning field goal taken away because of a penalty, leading to the first tie result between the two teams since the 1968 season. In St. Louis, the Rams kicked the game-winning field goal as time expired in overtime. 49ers lose Super Bowl XLVII. |
| 2013 | 49ers 2–0 | 49ers 23–13 | 49ers 35–11 | 49ers 64–62–3 | |
| 2014 | Tie 1–1 | Rams; 13–10 | 49ers 31–17 | 49ers 65–63–3 | 49ers open Levi's Stadium. |
| 2015 | Tie 1–1 | 49ers 19–16 (OT) | Rams; 27–6 | 49ers 66–64–3 | Game in San Francisco is the Rams' last game played as a St. Louis-based team. |
| 2016 | 49ers 2–0 | 49ers 28–0 | 49ers 22–21 | 49ers 68–64–3 | Rams relocate back to Los Angeles and Los Angeles Memorial Coliseum. In Los Angeles, 49ers overcame a 21–7 fourth-quarter deficit. 49ers' wins against the Rams would be their only wins in their 2016 season. |
| 2017 | Tie 1–1 | Rams; 41–39 | 49ers 34–13 | 49ers 69–65–3 | Kyle Shanahan and Sean McVay are hired as head coach for the 49ers and Rams respectively. |
| 2018 | Rams 2–0 | Rams; 39–10 | Rams; 48–32 | 49ers 69–67–3 | In Los Angeles, Rams clinched a first-round bye and achieved their first season series sweep against the 49ers since the 2004 season with their win. Rams lose Super Bowl LIII. |
| 2019 | 49ers 2–0 | 49ers 34–31 | 49ers 20–7 | 49ers 71–67–3 | In San Francisco, 49ers eliminate the Rams from playoff contention with their win. 49ers lose Super Bowl LIV. |

2020s (49ers, 9–5)

| Season | Season series | at San Francisco 49ers | at Los Angeles Rams | Overall series | Notes |
|---|---|---|---|---|---|
| 2020 | 49ers 2–0 | 49ers 24–16 | 49ers 23–20 | 49ers 73–67–3 | Rams open SoFi Stadium. |
| 2021 | 49ers 2–0 | 49ers 31–10 | 49ers 27–24 (OT) | 49ers 75–67–3 | Rams trade Jared Goff for Lions' QB Matthew Stafford. In Los Angeles, 49ers overcame a 17–0 deficit, snapping Rams' HC Sean McVay streak of 45 consecutive wins when leading at halftime, and clinched a playoff berth with their win. |
| 2021 Playoffs | Rams 1–0 | —N/a | Rams; 20–17 | 49ers 75–68–3 | NFC Championship Game. Rams overcame a 17–7 fourth-quarter deficit. Rams go on to win Super Bowl LVI. |
| 2022 | 49ers 2–0 | 49ers 24–9 | 49ers 31–14 | 49ers 77–68–3 | |
| 2023 | Tie 1–1 | Rams; 21–20 | 49ers 30–23 | 49ers 78–69–3 | 49ers lose Super Bowl LVIII. |
| 2024 | Rams 2–0 | Rams; 12–6 | Rams; 27–24 | 49ers 78–71–3 | |
| 2025 | Tie 1–1 | Rams; 42–26 | 49ers 26–23 (OT) | 49ers 79–72–3 | Both teams finished with 12–5 records, but the Rams clinched the higher playoff seed based on their record against common opponents. |
| 2026 | 49ers 1–0 | December 13 | 49ers 27–7 | 49ers 80–72–3 | Rams' home game played in Melbourne, Australia as part of the NFL International Series. |

Summary of Results

| Season | Season series | at San Francisco 49ers | at St. Louis/Los Angeles Rams | Notes |
|---|---|---|---|---|
| Regular season | 49ers 79–71–3 | Tie 37–37–2 | 49ers 42–34–1 | 49ers are 1–0 at Melbourne Cricket Ground in East Melbourne (2026), officially a Rams home game. |
| Postseason | Tie 1–1 | 49ers 1–0 | Rams 1–0 | NFC Championship: 1989, 2021 |
| Regular and postseason | 49ers 80–72–3 | 49ers 38–37–2 | 49ers 42–35–1 | 49ers have an 11–10 record in St. Louis and currently a 30–25–1 record in Los Angeles. |

== See also ==
- List of NFL rivalries
- NFC West
- Dodgers–Giants rivalry
- Northern California – Southern California rivalry
- Kings–Sharks rivalry
- Lakers–Warriors rivalry
- Angels–Athletics rivalry
- California Clásico
