= Kings–Sharks rivalry =

National Hockey League rivalry

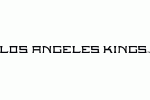
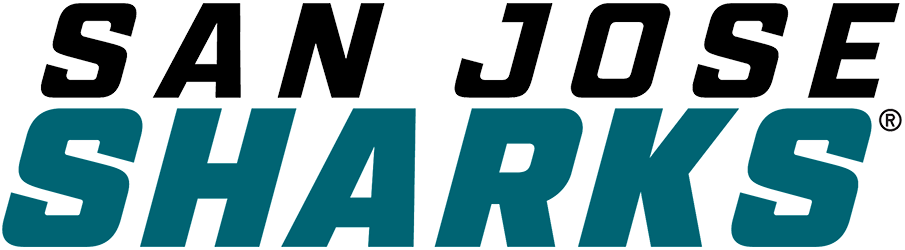
- Los Angeles Kings San Jose Sharks
- First meeting: October 16, 1991
- Latest meeting: November 4, 2026
- Next meeting: December 9, 2026

Statistics
- Total meetings: 210
- All-time series: 112–79–7–12 (SJS)
- Regular season series: 97–69–7–12 (SJS)
- Postseason results: 14–11 (SJS)
- Largest victory: LAK 11–4 SJS; November 8, 1992 LAK 8–1 SJS; March 30, 2025
- Longest win streak: LAK W6
- Current win streak: LAK W1

Postseason history
- 2011 conference quarterfinals: Sharks won, 4–2; 2013 conference semifinals: Kings won, 4–3; 2014 first round: Kings won, 4–3; 2016 first round: Sharks won, 4–1

The Kings–Sharks rivalry is a National Hockey League (NHL) rivalry between the Los Angeles Kings and San Jose Sharks. The two teams have played in the same division ever since the Sharks began play in the 1991–92 season. They were in the Smythe Division from 1991 to 1993 and have been in the Pacific Division ever since. This rivalry stems from the fact that both teams are located in the state of California, as well as the other professional sports rivalries between Greater Los Angeles and the San Francisco Bay Area, namely Dodgers–Giants, 49ers–Rams, Lakers–Warriors, and Earthquakes–Galaxy. The rivalry reached a boiling point in the early-to-mid 2010s, with Los Angeles and San Jose meeting in the playoffs four times in a span of six years, as well as one of the two teams appearing in six of seven conference finals from 2010 to 2016.

== Early history ==
From 1991 to April 4, 2011, San Jose won 59 games and Los Angeles won 50 games. They tied seven times, all prior to the 2004–05 NHL lockout (when the league implemented shootouts as tie-breakers after scoreless overtime periods in the regular season).

A notable early moment in the rivalry came late during the 1993–94 season, when all three California teams – the Kings (who had gone to the 1993 Stanley Cup Final), Sharks (then in only their third year of existence), and Mighty Ducks of Anaheim (then in their inaugural season) – battled for the eighth and final playoff spot in the newly-renamed Western Conference. Moreover, the Kings' superstar captain, Wayne Gretzky, was chasing the all-time NHL career goals record of 801 held by his idol, Gordie Howe. On March 20, 1994, during the first period of a Kings–Sharks game in San Jose, Gretzky scored the 800th goal of his career by stealing the puck from Sharks defenseman Sandis Ozolins and backhanding it through the legs of goaltender Arturs Irbe. Later, with the Sharks leading 6–5 in the final minute of the game, Gretzky jammed a rebound past Irbe for his second goal of the contest and the 801st of his career, tying Howe for the most career goals and the game at 6–6. The game would end as a 6–6 tie. On April 2, the Sharks' 7–4 victory over the Vancouver Canucks, combined with a 5–3 Kings loss to the Edmonton Oilers, eliminated the Kings from playoff contention. Three days later, the Sharks defeated the Kings 2–1 in Los Angeles to officially clinch their first-ever playoff berth.

== 2010–present ==
=== 2011: First playoff meeting ===
The rivalry heated up in 2010–11, with the Kings and Sharks meeting in the playoffs for the first time in history. The Sharks won the Pacific Division title and earned the second seed in the Western Conference, while the Kings earned the seventh seed. The series began at the HP Pavilion at San Jose. Left winger Dany Heatley and center Logan Couture scored in regulation for San Jose, while right wingers Dustin Brown and Justin Williams scored for Los Angeles. The game went to overtime, which Joe Pavelski scored to give San Jose a 1–0 series lead. The Kings rebounded in game two with a 4–0 win. Defenseman Drew Doughty had four points in the game, two of which were goals. He assisted on Jack Johnson and Kyle Clifford's goals.

The series shifted to the Staples Center in Los Angeles for game three. The Kings got off to a blazing start as they were up 4–0 in a game for the second consecutive game. Willie Mitchell, Kyle Clifford, Michal Handzus, and Brad Richardson scored the goals. Sharks' coach Todd McLellan decided to yank goaltender Antti Niemi and replace him with backup Antero Niittymäki. This seemed to spark San Jose as they fired home three unanswered goals scored by Patrick Marleau, Ryane Clowe, and Logan Couture. With the game suddenly close, Ryan Smyth scored for the Kings to make it 5–3. However, the Sharks came up with goals from both Clowe and Pavelski to tie the game at five before the second intermission. There was no scoring in the third period thus the game went to overtime. Devin Setoguchi scored his second of the game in the extra session to complete San Jose's miraculous comeback, giving his team a 6–5 victory in the game and a 2–1 lead in the series. The Sharks were able to duplicate their success in game four, this time winning in a more convincing fashion; they won 6–3, with Ryane Clowe scoring two goals in the victory and Niemi making 35 saves after a rough outing in game three.

The Sharks looked to close out the series at home in game five; Kings goaltender Jonathan Quick stopped that from happening, as he made 51 saves in a 3–1 victory to send the series back to Southern California for game six. Kyle Clifford, Wayne Simmonds, and Dustin Penner scored the goals for the Kings. In game six, the Kings looked to stave off elimination once more and force a seventh game in San Jose while the Sharks once again looked to close out the series. The two teams alternated goals in regulation until it was 3–3, with San Jose scoring first. Kyle Wellwood, Jason Demers, and Dany Heatley scored for the Sharks, while Justin Williams, Ryan Smyth, and Trevor Lewis scored for the Kings. Joe Thornton scored in overtime for San Jose, winning the game 4–3 and the series 4–2 to advance to the Western Conference semifinals. San Jose would be defeated by the Vancouver Canucks in the Western Conference finals.

=== 2013: Kings get revenge ===
Los Angeles and San Jose met in the conference semifinals of the 2013 playoffs as the West's fifth and sixth seeds, respectively. Los Angeles was coming off a victory over the fourth-seeded St. Louis Blues in six games while San Jose completed a series sweep of the third-seeded Vancouver Canucks. The Kings were in the midst of an attempt to defend their 2012 Cup victory while the Sharks were looking to advance to the conference finals for the fourth time in franchise history.

The first game saw Jonathan Quick make 35 saves in a 2–0 shutout of San Jose. Mike Richards and Slava Voynov scored the only two goals of the game. The Kings jumped out to a 2–0 lead in game two, but this time San Jose answered. Marleau and Brad Stuart scored to tie the game, while Marc-Édouard Vlasic gave the Sharks the lead with 11:04 left in the game. However, the Sharks later received two penalties in the game. Stuart was penalized for tripping, and Vlasic was penalized for delay-of-game. The Kings took full advantage of the penalties; Dustin Brown tied the game at three on the five-on-three power play, and Trevor Lewis scored on a rebound off a Tyler Toffoli shot to win the game for the Kings 4–3 in regulation, giving them a 2–0 series lead heading up north.

San Jose got off to a fast start in game three on home ice, as veteran Dan Boyle scored two minutes into the game to give his team the 1–0 lead. However, the Kings capitalized on a Sharks' defensive zone turnover, tying the game on a goal by Toffoli. The game went to overtime, tied 1–1. A pair of penalties was called on the Kings this time. Robyn Regehr and Trevor Lewis were the penalized players. Logan Couture scored on the five-on-three advantage to give San Jose a 2–1 victory and cut the Kings' series lead in half. The final score was the same in game four – although not in overtime – drawing the Sharks even in the series. Brent Burns and Logan Couture scored for San Jose, while Mike Richards scored for Los Angeles. Sharks goaltender Antti Niemi stopped 22 of 23 shots, with 13 of his saves coming in the third period alone.

With the series tied 2–2, the teams went back to the Staples Center. The Sharks had all the momentum in game five, but the Kings took it from them. Los Angeles won game five by a score of 3–0. Anže Kopitar and Slava Voynov scored the first two goals, then Jeff Carter added an empty-net goal. Quick stopped all 24 shots he faced in the game. Just like the previous two games of the series in San Jose, the Sharks won 2–1 at home. Joe Thornton scored on a five-on-three in the first period and then TJ Galiardi scored in the second period. Dustin Brown scored Los Angeles' only goal.

For the first time in history, Los Angeles and San Jose were playing a seventh game against each other. Justin Williams scored both goals for the Kings in a 2–1 victory, and Dan Boyle scored the only goal for San Jose. This meant that the home team won every game in the series, additionally, as the home team won every game in their four-game regular season series, the home team won all 11 games that season. Los Angeles continued their quest for a Stanley Cup repeat to the Western Conference finals, but were ousted by the President's Trophy-winning Chicago Blackhawks in five games.

=== 2014: Kings complete 3–0 comeback ===
In the 2013–14 season, San Jose and Los Angeles finished second and third in the Pacific Division, respectively. With the new playoff format in place, this set up the second consecutive and third overall meeting between the two California rivals.

Game one was at the SAP Center. Joe Thornton got things started for the home team by scoring the first goal of the game. In the final minute of the first period, Tomáš Hertl and Patrick Marleau scored 48 seconds apart to give the Sharks a 3–0 lead after just 20 minutes of play. Fourth-liner Raffi Torres and defenseman Marc-Édouard Vlasic tallied the next two goals to make it 5–0 San Jose. This prompted Los Angeles' coach Darryl Sutter to replace Jonathan Quick with backup goaltender Martin Jones. Coach Sutter's team seemed to be sparked by that move, as they got three unanswered goals from Jake Muzzin, Slava Voynov, and Trevor Lewis to make it 5–3. However, their comeback effort proved unsuccessful, as Brent Burns added an empty net goal for San Jose to give them a 6–3 win and a 1–0 series lead. Game two ended up even more lopsided. Although Los Angeles jumped to a 2–0 first period lead after goals from Muzzin and Lewis, San Jose blazed to a lead. Mike Brown and Raffi Torres netted goals to tie the game. San Jose then got five unanswered goals from Justin Braun, Patrick Marleau, Joe Pavelski, Logan Couture, and Joe Thornton. It was only the third time in 26 total attempts that the Sharks overcame a two-goal deficit in a playoff game. Goaltender Antti Niemi made 24 saves, while his counterpart Quick made 33 saves (albeit he gave up seven goals).

Back in Los Angeles for game three, Marleau scored to overtime game winner to give San Jose a commanding 3–0 series lead and a chance to sweep their rivals. It was do or die for the Kings, who faced the possibility of being swept on home ice. Game four started nip and tuck, as Los Angeles and San Jose traded goals to start the first and second periods. Marián Gáborík opened the scoring, then James Sheppard tied the game for the Sharks. Justin Williams scored on the power play to give the Kings the lead, then Matt Nieto scored to tie the game once more. Los Angeles then blazed to a 5–2 lead with second period goals from Williams and Tyler Toffoli followed by Gáborík's second goal 34 seconds into the third period. Joe Pavelski pulled the Sharks to within two later on, but Dustin Brown scored an empty net goal to help Los Angeles double up San Jose 6–3. Jonathan Quick turned in a 36-save performance, while Niemi got chased out of goal after Gáborík's 5–2 goal.

The series shifted back to San Jose, with the Sharks looking to close out the series and advance to the second round. Los Angeles once again stifled any chances of that happening, winning game five by a 3–0 score. Toffoli, Kopitar, and Carter scored the goals, while Quick made stopped all 30 shots he faced. In game six at the Staples Center, Justin Williams scored first for Los Angeles to give them a 1–0 lead through 20 minutes of play. James Sheppard evened the score 1–1 in the second period for San Jose, where it remained until intermission. In the third period, Sharks goaltender Alex Stalock appeared to have control of the puck after a shot, but the referees never blew the whistle. Williams poked the puck in for his second goal of the game, but not without controversy. The play was reviewed, but the call on the ice stood. Kopitar then added an even strength goal and a power play goal for insurance to end the game in a 4–1 score in favor of Los Angeles. The series went to game seven after the two teams traded three-game win streaks.

The first period of the game between the two California foes was scoreless. Veteran defenseman Dan Boyle was whistled for a two-minute high-sticking penalty, but Los Angeles failed to capitalize. Less than 30 seconds into the middle frame, Matt Irwin scored to put San Jose ahead 1–0. Their lead only lasted a couple of minutes as Doughty scored a power play goal with Tommy Wingels and Logan Couture in the penalty box for hooking and elbowing, respectively. The Kings killed four straight penalties before Williams fed Kopitar the puck to score the go-ahead goal late in the period. This stood as the game winner, as Toffoli, Brown, and Pearson added insurance goals. Los Angeles became just the fourth team to win a series after being down 3–0, with the others being the 1941–42 Maple Leafs, 1974–75 Islanders, and the 2009–10 Flyers (which coincidentally, Los Angeles forwards Jeff Carter and Mike Richards were members). The Kings went on to defeat their Southern California rivals, the Anaheim Ducks, and the Chicago Blackhawks in two grueling seven-game series before knocking off the New York Rangers in the 2014 Stanley Cup Final in five games to win their second title in franchise history.

=== 2014–15: Stadium Series, down year ===
Over the course of the 2014–15 season, the Kings and Sharks were hovering in and around the final few playoff spots in the Western Conference. On February 21, 2015, Los Angeles and San Jose played the Stadium Series game at Levi's Stadium in Santa Clara, the then-brand new home of the San Francisco 49ers. This was the second outdoor game played in California in as many years, with the other game being one of the inaugural Stadium Series games between the Kings and Anaheim Ducks at Dodger Stadium (Anaheim won 3–0).

Los Angeles opened the scoring in the first period. San Jose tried to clear their own zone, but Muzzin was at the left point to keep it within the blueline. He then wristed a shot that deflected off of Kyle Clifford and into the net for a 1–0 lead. With 1:04 left in the period, Tommy Wingels won a faceoff for San Jose sending the puck to star defenseman Brent Burns. Burns scored from a sharp angle off of the shaft of goaltender Jonathan Quick's stick to tie the game. There was no scoring in the second period leaving the score tied 1–1. Early in the third period, Burns tried to dump the puck in from the neutral zone, but the puck deflected off Kings' forward Jeff Carter towards Marián Gáborík. Gáborík took full advantage and buried his shot from 39 feet to give Los Angeles a 2–1 lead. That stood as the final score giving Los Angeles the victory. This game was a detriment to San Jose's playoff hopes as they failed to make the playoffs for the first time since 2003. The Kings' fortunes were no better as they failed to make the playoffs as well for only the second time in seven years becoming first team since the 2006–07 Hurricanes to miss the playoffs the year after winning the Stanley Cup.

=== 2015–16: Another playoff meeting, Sharks prevail over the Kings ===
After a mediocre showing from both teams the previous year, San Jose and Los Angeles posted strong records in the regular season. The Kings finished second in the Pacific with 102 points and the Sharks finished third with 98 points. They met in the playoffs for the fourth time in history.

The series kicked off at Staples Center. Early in the first period, Los Angeles defenseman Jake Muzzin scored a goal off of Sharks forward Tomáš Hertl's skate for the 1–0 lead. The Kings held the Sharks without a shot on goal for the first several minutes of the game, but then Pavelski's power play tally leveled the score. San Jose's defenseman Brent Burns pushed his team into the lead after taking advantage of teammate Joel Ward's faceoff win in Los Angeles' zone. Their lead only lasted 40 seconds, as Jeff Carter scored off of a deflection from Burns' stick and past Jones. Drew Doughty was whistled for a hooking penalty, but teammate Trevor Lewis scored shorthanded, giving the Kings the lead once more. The Sharks evened things out on their power play, however, with a goal of their own from Tomáš Hertl. Joe Pavelski then scored his second goal of the game 17 seconds into the third period to give the Sharks their second lead of the game, 4–3. That remained the final score, giving San Jose the game one victory. San Jose was able to repeat their result in game two, winning 2–1 behind goals from Pavelski and Logan Couture and 26 saves from Jones. Veteran forward Vincent Lecavalier scored the Kings' only tally after his team had a scoreless stretch of 77:41.

The Kings traveled up to the northern part of the state down 2–0 in their series with the Sharks. They needed a big win in game three to keep their chances alive as another 3–0 comeback like they did in 2014. They got the victory in game three after goals from Kopitar and Tanner Pearson (the latter coming in overtime). San Jose's only goal was from veteran Joe Thornton 30 seconds into the game, which was followed by 29 saves made by Jonathan Quick. In game four, the Sharks scored three power play goals (two in the second period and one in the third) from Burns, Pavelski, and Marleau to take a 3–0 lead. The Kings threatened to tie the game after goals from Trevor Lewis and Luke Schenn, but it failed as San Jose won game four 3–2 and took a 3–1 series lead heading back to Los Angeles. Jones and Quick both made 26 saves during the game.

San Jose had a chance to win the series in five games and they got off to a great start. Joonas Donskoi, Chris Tierney, and Matt Nieto scored for the Sharks, all at even-strength, to give their team a 3–0 lead. The Kings, however, rallied to tie the game behind goals from Kopitar, Carter, and Kris Versteeg. However, Donskoi jumped on a rebound for his second goal of the game to put the Sharks ahead 4–3, 3:58 into the third period. That stood as the winning goal, as Joe Pavelski and Melker Karlsson added insurance goals (with the latter being an empty net goal) to give the Sharks a 6–3 victory and a 4–1 series victory over Los Angeles, sending them to the second round. Afterwards, the Sharks defeated the Nashville Predators in seven games, then the St. Louis Blues in the Western Conference finals in six games, before falling short to the Pittsburgh Penguins in six games in their first ever Stanley Cup Final.

=== 2020–21 season ===
Due to the NHL's realignment (with the creation of the North Division) during the 2020–21 and adoption of division-only play due to the COVID-19 pandemic, the Sharks and Kings played against each other eight times during the 2020–21 regular season. Both teams, along with their California-rival, the Anaheim Ducks, and other Pacific Division opponents (Arizona Coyotes and Vegas Golden Knights), along with the Colorado Avalanche, Minnesota Wild and St. Louis Blues of the Central Division, were put in the West Division.

== See also ==
- List of NHL rivalries
- Northern–Southern rivalry
- Dodgers–Giants rivalry
- 49ers–Rams rivalry
- Lakers–Warriors rivalry
- Chargers–Raiders rivalry
- Angels–Athletics rivalry
- California Clásico
