= Dodgers–Giants rivalry =

Major League Baseball in-state rivalry in California

- Los Angeles Dodgers San Francisco Giants
- Location: California (previously, New York City until 1957)
- First meeting: May 3, 1890; Polo Grounds, Upper Manhattan, New York; Bridegrooms 7, Giants 3
- Latest meeting: September 27, 2026; Oracle Park, San Francisco, California; Dodgers 5, Giants 1
- Next meeting: May 6, 2027; Dodger Stadium, Los Angeles, California
- Stadiums: Dodgers: Dodger Stadium; Giants: Oracle Park

Statistics
- Total meetings: 2,611
- All-time series: Dodgers, 1,300–1,294–17 (.501)
- Regular season series: Dodgers, 1,297–1,292–17 (.501)
- Postseason results: Dodgers, 3–2 (.600)
- Largest victory: Dodgers, 17–0 (September 13, 2014); Giants, 20–2 (May 6, 1903; September 10, 1938); 26–8 (April 30, 1944)
- Longest win streak: Dodgers, 10 (July 12 – September 6, 1953); Giants, 12 (October 2, 1937 – July 4, 1938)
- Current win streak: Dodgers, 8

Post-season history
- 2021 NL Division Series: Dodgers won, 3–2

Locations of the Los Angeles Dodgers and San Francisco Giants

The Dodgers–Giants rivalry is regarded as one of the fiercest and longest-standing rivalries in American baseball, with some observers considering it the greatest sports rivalry of all time. It dates back to the late 19th century, when both clubs were based in New York City.

After the 1957 season, Brooklyn Dodgers owner Walter O'Malley decided to move the team to Los Angeles for financial and other reasons. Along the way, he convinced New York Giants owner Horace Stoneham (who was considering moving his team to Minnesota) to preserve the rivalry by bringing his team to California as well. New York baseball fans were stunned and heartbroken by the move, which left the city with only one baseball team, the Yankees. However, to ease the loss of both the Dodgers and Giants, New York City was granted a fourth baseball team, the Mets, who began play in 1962. The Mets appealed to both sets of fans by adopting colors from each team: orange from the Giants and blue from the Dodgers. They eventually moved into a new stadium in Queens, a borough which had not previously hosted Major League Baseball.

Given that the cities of Los Angeles and San Francisco had long harbored animosity against one another in the economic, cultural, and political arenas, the teams' new homes in California were fertile ground for the rivalry's transplantation. Each team's ability to endure for over a century while moving across the country, as well as the rivalry's growth from a cross-city to a cross-state engagement, have led to the rivalry being considered one of the greatest in sports history. Geographic factors have also led to the rivalry becoming one of the fiercest between fans as numerous acts of violence have occurred between both players and fans alike.

The Dodgers and Giants each have more National League pennants than any other team: the Dodgers have 26 and the Giants have 23. The Dodgers have one more World Series title than the Giants, with 9. The Dodgers have won the National League West 24 times compared to the Giants' 9 times since the beginning of the Divisional Era in 1969, and the all-time regular-season series head-to-head is tied. Since moving to California, the Dodgers hold the edge in pennants (14–6) and World Series titles (8–3). The Giants' most recent World Series appearance and championship occurred in 2014. The Dodgers last appeared in the World Series in 2025, winning back-to-back titles for the first time in franchise history by defeating the Blue Jays in seven games.

During their time on the East Coast, the Giants won the series 722–671–17 against the Dodgers. However, since the two teams moved to the West Coast, the Dodgers lead 626–570 as of the end of their September 2026 regular season series. The two teams first met in the modern playoffs in the 2021 National League Division Series, although they contested the 1889 World Series. They have played two tie-breaker series after ending the regular season tied for first place. Both series were best of 3 to decide the winner of the National League Pennant and both were won by the Giants 2–1 in 1951 and 1962. They are counted as part of the regular season.

== History ==
=== Late 1800s–1957: The New York years ===
New York Giants (1883–1957)

Brooklyn Dodgers (1890–1957)

In the 1880s, New York City played host to a number of professional baseball clubs in the National League and the American Association. By 1889, each league had only one representative in New York—the Giants in the NL and Dodgers (then known as the Bridegrooms) in the AA. The teams met in the 1889 World Series, in which the Giants defeated the Bridegrooms 6 games to 3. In 1890, the Dodgers entered the NL and the rivalry was officially underway.

Although the three teams were geographically proximate rivals anyway, the animus between the two teams ran deeper than mere competitiveness. Giants fans were seen as well to do elitists of Manhattan while Dodgers fans tended to be more blue collar and had more Latino fans due to what was then the working class atmosphere of Brooklyn. In 1900, a year in which the Dodgers won the pennant and the Giants finished last, Giants owner Andrew Freedman attempted to have the NL split all profits equally, irrespective of the teams’ individual success or failure. In the early 1900s, the rivalry was heightened by a long-standing personal feud (originally a business difference) between Charles Ebbets, owner of the Dodgers, and John McGraw, manager of the Giants. The two used their teams as fighting surrogates, which caused incidents between players both on and off the field, and inflamed local fans' passions sometimes to deadly levels.

Prior to the 1934 season, Giants manager Bill Terry was asked his opinion of various teams for the upcoming campaign, including the Dodgers. His response of "Are they still in the league?" was to prove provocative. While the Dodgers struggled, the Giants found themselves tied with the St. Louis Cardinals atop the National League with two games left to play, and facing the sixth-place Dodgers for a two-game series in Brooklyn. Despite winning 14 of 22 from the Dodgers that year, the Giants lost those last two to the "Flatbush spoilers" and the pennant to the Cardinals, who won their final two games.

The rivalry is said to have been the motive for multiple fan-on-fan homicides, in 1938 and 2003. Future Dodgers manager Joe Torre recalled how he felt threatened being a Giants fan growing up in Brooklyn in the series.

Former locations of the Brooklyn Dodgers and New York Giants

The 1951 National League pennant race between the Dodgers and the Giants is considered one of the greatest pennant races of all time. The Dodgers held a 13 1/2-game lead over the Giants as late as August 11. Led by rookie Willie Mays, however, the Giants charged through August and September to catch and pass the Dodgers. The Dodgers won the final game of the season, tying the Giants for first place and necessitating a three-game tiebreaker for the pennant. The Giants won the first game, and the Dodgers won the second. In the third game of the series, the Dodgers led 4–1 going into the bottom of the ninth. However, the Giants ignited a rally capped off with a dramatic game-winning home run by Bobby Thomson, a play known as the Shot Heard 'Round the World. The Giants would eventually lose the World Series to the Yankees.

During the 1956–1957 offseason, Dodgers legend Jackie Robinson famously retired just hours after being traded to the Giants.

==== 1958: Move to California ====
Following the 1957 season, Dodgers owner Walter O'Malley moved the team to Los Angeles despite the team being one of the most profitable teams in baseball at the time. At the same time, Giants owner Horace Stoneham was considering moving the team out of New York as well. After considering Minneapolis, Minnesota and St. Petersburg, Florida as potential locations, O'Malley convinced Stoneham to keep the rivalry alive and move the team to San Francisco. With the move, the teams became the first two MLB teams in the Western US. West Coast baseball officially began on Opening Day in 1958 at Seals Stadium in San Francisco, with the Giants defeating the visiting Dodgers 8–0.

=== 1958–1970s ===
In 1959, the Giants led the Dodgers by three games as late as September 6. However, a late-year three-game sweep of the Giants both eliminated San Francisco from contention and allowed the Dodgers to catch the Milwaukee Braves, whom they defeated two games to zero in a three-game tiebreaker en route to winning the World Series. This started a string of pennant races between the two teams in the 1960s, in which the Giants and Dodgers finished no further than four games apart from each other and first place four times through 1966.

The Giants and Dodgers tied for first place in 1962 which necessitated a three game playoff which the Giants won in game three.

During the Dodgers championship season of 1965, the Giants went on a 14-game winning streak in early September to take a 4 1/2-game lead, but the Dodgers responded with a 13-game winning streak and won 15 of their final 16 games to beat out the Giants by two games. The Dodgers continued the momentum of that winning streak to another World Series championship.

In 1966, a three-way race between the Dodgers, Giants, and Pittsburgh Pirates came down to the last day of the season. The Dodgers went into the second game of a doubleheader with the Philadelphia Phillies ahead of the Giants by one game. Had the Dodgers lost, the Giants would have been 1/2 game out and would have had to fly to Cincinnati to make up a game that had been rained out earlier in the season. If the Giants won that game, they would then have met the Dodgers in a playoff. But the Dodgers won the second game in Philadelphia to win the pennant by 1 1/2 games. In 1971, the Dodgers rallied from a 6 1/2-game September deficit to get within a game of the National League West-leading Giants with one game to play. But while the Dodgers were defeating the Houston Astros, the Giants beat the San Diego Padres to win the division.

=== 1980s–1990s ===
In 1980, the Dodgers blew an eighth-inning lead at San Francisco in the last game of the second-to-last series of the year. This loss dropped the Dodgers three games behind the Houston Astros and cost them the chance to win the National League West division outright when they swept Houston in the final three games of the year. Instead, they were forced to play the Astros in a one-game tiebreaker – which they lost 7–1. In 1982, the Dodgers and Giants were tied for second in the NL West, both one game behind the Atlanta Braves, as they faced each other in the final three games of the year. The Dodgers won the first two games 4–0 and 15–4 to eliminate the Giants, but then the Giants knocked the Dodgers out of the pennant race on the season's last day on a go-ahead three-run home run by Joe Morgan in the seventh inning, eventually winning the game 5–3. Thus, the Braves finished first by one game.

The Giants did it again in 1991, as the Dodgers finished one game behind the Braves after losing two of three in San Francisco over the final weekend. Trevor Wilson tossed a complete game shutout on the day in which the Dodgers were eliminated. The Dodgers returned the favor in 1993, as two Mike Piazza home runs and a dominant complete-game performance by Kevin Gross resulted in a 12–1 win on the final day of the season that kept the 103-win Giants out of the playoffs. True to the balanced spirit of the rivalry, despite winning the first three games of that four-game series in Los Angeles, the Giants were unable to sweep the Dodgers at their home park in a four-game series for the first time since 1923, and the Braves won the division by one game.

In 1997, a late September two-game sweep of the Dodgers at Candlestick Park highlighted by Barry Bonds' twirl after a home run in the first game and Brian Johnson's home run in the bottom of the 12th in the second tied the Giants with the Dodgers for first place and eventually propelled them into the playoffs. The impact on both organizations was significant; Fred Claire, who was then general manager of the Dodgers, said "those two days have stayed with me for the last 10 years", and Los Angeles Times sports columnist Bill Plaschke argued that "it led to an organizational upheaval...(from which) (i)t has taken the Dodgers nearly a decade to recover." In contrast, the Giants' run from 1997 through 2003 produced the most playoff appearances in that stretch for the franchise since the 1930s.

=== 21st century ===
In 2001, the Giants finished two games behind the Arizona Diamondbacks as the Dodgers took two of the final three games of the year in San Francisco, despite Giants' outfielder Barry Bonds hitting an MLB record 73 home runs that season. In 2004, the two teams were engaged in another late-season division race. After almost every reliever in the Giants bullpen had attempted to preserve a 3–0 lead going into the bottom of the ninth during a matchup at Dodger Stadium on October 2, several walks and an error set the stage for Steve Finley's dramatic grand slam off of Wayne Franklin, which clinched the division title for the Dodgers. Even with the wild card still up for grabs, this proved disastrous for the Giants – despite ace Jason Schmidt's fine performance in a 10–0 rout over the Dodgers the following day, an Astros win during the game eliminated the Giants from playoff contention. Had the Giants maintained their lead in the previous game and Schmidt performed similarly, the Giants would have forced a one-game tiebreaker against the Dodgers for the division crown.

In 2012, the Dodgers and Giants met in the final series of the regular season. The Giants had already clinched the NL West, but the Dodgers were in the wild card race. The Dodgers took 2 out of 3, but their 4–3 loss in game 2 of the series eliminated them from wild-card contention, giving the lower wild-card seed to St. Louis. The Cardinals would eventually lose the NLCS to the eventual champion Giants in seven games. In 2014, Clayton Kershaw and the Dodgers shut down the Giants 5–1 late in the season, giving the Dodgers their second straight NL West crown. Kershaw and fellow Dodgers starter Zack Greinke went a combined 8–0 against the Giants. The Giants qualified for the playoffs two days later, earning the NL's second wild card. However, the Dodgers were eventually eliminated by the Cardinals in their NLDS, after which the Giants defeated the Cardinals in the NLCS and ultimately won the World Series over the Kansas City Royals.

The Dodgers' 2014 and 2016 National League West championships were both won by overcoming leads by the Giants. Los Angeles overcame a 9 1/2 game lead by the Giants in 2014, and in 2016, despite the Dodgers missing star pitcher Clayton Kershaw for an extended amount of time, the Giants were unable to hold an eight-game lead over their rivals. In both seasons, though, the Giants won one of the Wild Card spots. In the 2014 postseason, the Dodgers entered as NL West champions and the Giants a Wild Card team. The Giants defeated the Pittsburgh Pirates in the Wild Card Game and the Washington Nationals in the Division Series 3–1 to qualify for the National League Championship Series. The Dodgers on the other hand lost to the St. Louis Cardinals in the Division Series. Had the Dodgers won, they would have faced each other in the NLCS. In 2016, the Dodgers came into the postseason as NL West champions, while the Giants again entered as a Wild Card team. The Dodgers defeated the Nationals in the Division Series to advance to the National League Championship Series. The Giants defeated the New York Mets in the Wild Card Game. However, the Giants lost to the Chicago Cubs in the Division Series, preventing a Dodgers-Giants matchup in the NLCS. During the 2010s, the Giants won three World Series titles, while the Dodgers had to wait until 2020 to win their first World Series since 1988.

On the final day of the shortened 2020 regular season, the Giants, Philadelphia Phillies, and Milwaukee Brewers were fighting for the eighth and final seed in the expanded playoff tournament. For the Giants to clinch the eighth seed, they needed a win against the San Diego Padres and both a Brewers and Phillies loss, which would've set up a matchup against the Dodgers in the Wild Card Series. However, the Giants were eliminated from postseason contention when they were defeated by the Padres. In 2021, the Giants clinched both the National League West division and home-field advantage throughout the playoffs with the best record in all of baseball over the Dodgers, which not only snapped a streak of 8 consecutive division championships for Los Angeles, but also they faced the winner of the 2021 NL Wild Card Game (between LA and the St. Louis Cardinals) in the NLDS. The Dodgers defeated the Cardinals off a Chris Taylor walk-off home run, and they met the Giants for the first time ever in the postseason.

On September 19, 2025, the Los Angeles Dodgers would tie the all-time regular season series head-to-head for the first time since August 11, 1896, which was also Clayton Kershaw's final home start at Dodger Stadium. The next day, the Dodgers would take the all-time series head-to-head for the first time since August 8, 1896. The Dodgers would go on to win the 2025 World Series, becoming the first team since the 1999–2000 Yankees to repeat as champions.

==== 2021 NLDS ====
In the NLDS, the Dodgers and Giants played in their first postseason meeting in history. This series was evenly matched especially with both sides exchanging big moments towards each other. Logan Webb dominated the Dodgers through 7 2/3 innings as the Giants shut out the Dodgers in Game 1, 4–0. The Dodgers answered back with a 9–2 victory in Game 2, including a home run by Will Smith to even the series. The series shifted to Dodger Stadium in what would be a battle between Max Scherzer and Alex Wood, however the Giants would pull away with Game 3 thanks to a home run by Evan Longoria to give the Giants a 1–0 win, it also happened to be extremely windy that night. With the Dodgers facing elimination in Game 4, they sent out Walker Buehler on three days rest to start, the Dodgers would even up the series once more thanks to home runs by Mookie Betts and Will Smith (his second of the series) in a 7–2 victory. With both teams' seasons on the line, now headed back to San Francisco tied at two games apiece, the Giants sent out Logan Webb to try and clinch the series. Originally, the Dodgers had Julio Urias to be the starter, but instead started reliever Corey Knebel. The two teams remained scoreless until a Corey Seager RBI double broke the tie in the sixth to give them the lead. However, the Giants answered back on a solo home run by Darin Ruf off of Urias, but that would be all the Giants would score for the rest of the game. The game once again remain tied until the top of the ninth when Cody Bellinger drove in Justin Turner to give the Dodgers a 2–1 lead off of Camilo Doval. Max Scherzer came in to close out the bottom half of the ninth. Crawford was the first batter retired, but an error by Justin Turner on a batted ball from Kris Bryant would give the Giants life in the inning. Scherzer struck out LaMonte Wade and Wilmer Flores to give the Dodgers the series win and a trip to the NLCS against the Atlanta Braves. This was also the first career save for Max Scherzer in his professional career.

== Postseason meetings ==
In the 131-year history of the rivalry, the Giants and Dodgers had never faced each other in the postseason until the 2021 NLDS. In that series, the Dodgers and Giants played in their first postseason meeting in history. This series was evenly matched especially with both sides exchanging big moments towards each other. Logan Webb dominated the Dodgers through 7 2/3 innings as the Giants shut out the Dodgers in Game 1, 4–0. The Dodgers answered back with a 9–2 victory in Game 2, including a home run by Will Smith to even the series. The series shifted to Dodger Stadium in what would be a battle between Max Scherzer and Alex Wood, however the Giants would pull away with Game 3 thanks to a home run by Evan Longoria to give the Giants a 1–0 win.

With the Dodgers facing elimination in Game 4, they sent out Walker Buehler on 3 days rest to start, the Dodgers would even up the series once more thanks to home runs by Mookie Betts and Will Smith (his second of the series) in a 7–2 victory. With both teams' seasons on the line, now headed back to San Francisco tied at two games apiece, the Giants sent out Logan Webb to try and clinch the series. Originally, the Dodgers had Julio Urias to be the starter, but instead started reliever Corey Knebel. The two teams remained scoreless until a Corey Seager RBI double broke the tie in the sixth to give them the lead. However, the Giants answered back on a solo home run by Darin Ruf off of Urias, but that would be all the Giants would score for the rest of the game. The game once again remain tied until the top of the ninth when Cody Bellinger drove in Justin Turner to give the Dodgers a 2–1 lead off of Camilo Doval. Max Scherzer came in to close out the bottom half of the ninth. Crawford was the first batter retired, but an error by Justin Turner on a batted ball from Kris Bryant would give the Giants life in the inning. Scherzer struck out LaMonte Wade and Wilmer Flores to give the Dodgers the series win and a trip to the NLCS against the Atlanta Braves. This was also the first career save for Max Scherzer in his professional career. As of 2024, this remains the only time the Dodgers and Giants met in the postseason.

There have been other times prior to 2021 where the Giants and Dodgers almost met in the playoffs, but did not:

- In the 2014 postseason, the Dodgers entered as NL West champions and the Giants a Wild Card team. The Giants defeated the Pittsburgh Pirates in the Wild Card Game and the Washington Nationals in the Division Series 3–1 to qualify for the National League Championship Series. The Dodgers on the other hand lost to the St. Louis Cardinals in the Division Series. Had the Dodgers won, they would have faced each other in the NLCS.
- In 2016, the Dodgers came into the postseason as NL West champions, while the Giants again entered as a Wild Card team. The Dodgers defeated the Nationals in the Division Series to advance to the National League Championship Series. The Giants defeated the New York Mets in the Wild Card Game. However, the Giants lost to the Chicago Cubs in the Division Series, preventing a Dodgers-Giants matchup in the NLCS.
- On the final day of the shortened 2020 regular season, the Giants, Philadelphia Phillies, and Milwaukee Brewers were fighting for the eighth and final seed in the expanded playoff tournament. For the Giants to clinch the eighth seed, they needed a win against the San Diego Padres and both a Brewers and Phillies loss, which would've set up a matchup against the Dodgers in the Wild Card Series. However, the Giants were eliminated from postseason contention when they were defeated by the Padres.

== Pennants and championships ==
The Dodgers won the National League pennant 12 times in Brooklyn and 14 times in Los Angeles. The Giants won the National League pennant 17 times in New York and 6 times in San Francisco.

When the teams were based in New York, the Giants won five world championships, whereas the Dodgers won one. After the move to California, the Dodgers have won eight, the Giants three. Prior to the 2020s, in both New York and in California, all of one team's world championships preceded the other's first one in that region to date. The Giants' five world championships won in New York preceded the Dodgers' only one in Brooklyn, in 1955. The Dodgers' first five world championships won in Los Angeles preceded the Giants' first one in San Francisco, in 2010. Before 2020, all of the Dodgers' world championships were sandwiched by the Giants' final world championship in New York (1954) and their first in San Francisco (2010).

Since 2000, the Giants have advanced to the postseason eight times while the Dodgers have advanced sixteen times. In that time, the Giants appeared in four World Series, winning in 2010, 2012, 2014, and losing in 2002. The Dodgers made five World Series appearances, losing the Series in 2017 and 2018, and winning in 2020, 2024, and 2025.

== Season-by-season results ==
Dodgers vs. Giants Season-by-Season Results (Note: The New York Giants and Brooklyn Bridgegrooms played in the 1889 World Series, with the Giants winning 6–3 against the then-American Association member Bridegrooms. All playoff series prior to the 1903 World Series are not counted in official postseason records. The teams did not officially have their first game until 1890, and the only official postseason series between the clubs as of 2026 is the 2021 National League Division Series.)
1890s (Giants, 72–65–4)

Season	Season series		at Brooklyn (Bride)grooms/Superbas	at New York Giants	Overall series	Notes
1890	Bridegrooms	10‍–‍8	Tie, 5‍–‍5	Bridegrooms, 5‍–‍3	Bridegrooms; 10‍–‍8	Dodgers (then known as the Brooklyn Bridegrooms) move to the National League, win 1890 NL pennant Bridegrooms tie the 1890 pre-modern World Series
1891	Giants	11‍–‍8	Giants, 7‍–‍3	Grooms, 5‍–‍4	Giants; 19‍–‍18	Bridegrooms change their name to "Grooms."
1892	Tie	7‍–‍7	Grooms, 4‍–‍3	Giants, 4‍–‍3	Giants; 26‍–‍25	
1893	Tie	6‍–‍6	Grooms, 5‍–‍1	Giants, 5‍–‍1	Giants; 32‍–‍31	
1894	Giants	7‍–‍5‍–‍1	Giants, 4‍–‍2‍–‍1	Tie, 3‍–‍3	Giants; 39‍–‍36‍–‍1	Giants win 1894 Temple Cup
1895	Grooms	9‍–‍3‍–‍1	Grooms, 5‍–‍1‍–‍1	Grooms, 4‍–‍2	Grooms; 45‍–‍42‍–‍2	
1896	Giants	8‍–‍4	Tie, 3‍–‍3	Giants, 5‍–‍1	Giants; 50‍–‍49‍–‍2	On August 11th, Giants take a 50–49–2 series lead, a lead the Giants would not relinquish until 2025.
1897	Giants	9‍–‍3‍–‍2	Giants, 5‍–‍1‍–‍1	Giants, 4‍–‍2‍–‍1	Giants; 59‍–‍52‍–‍4	Grooms change their name to "Bridegrooms"
1898	Giants	11‍–‍3	Giants, 4‍–‍3	Giants, 7‍–‍0	Giants; 70‍–‍55‍–‍4	
1899	Superbas	10‍–‍2	Superbas, 5‍–‍2	Superbas, 5‍–‍0	Giants; 72‍–‍65‍–‍4	Bridegrooms change their name to "Superbas," win 1899 NL pennant.

1900s (Giants, 128–80–3)

Season	Season series		at Brooklyn Superbas	at New York Giants	Overall series	Notes
1900	Tie	10‍–‍10	Superbas, 6‍–‍4	Giants, 6‍–‍4	Giants; 82‍–‍75‍–‍4	Superbas win 1900 NL pennant.
1901	Superbas	11‍–‍6	Superbas, 5‍–‍3	Superbas, 6‍–‍3	Giants; 88‍–‍86‍–‍4	
1902	Tie	10‍–‍10	Giants, 6‍–‍4	Superbas, 6‍–‍4	Giants; 98‍–‍96‍–‍4	
1903	Giants	12‍–‍7‍–‍2	Giants, 7‍–‍3	Giants, 5‍–‍4‍–‍2	Giants; 110‍–‍103‍–‍6	First year of organized Major League Baseball
1904	Giants	19‍–‍3	Giants, 9‍–‍2	Giants, 10‍–‍1	Giants; 129‍–‍106‍–‍6	Giants win 1904 NL Pennant, refuse to participate in the 1904 World Series.
1905	Giants	15‍–‍7	Giants, 8‍–‍3	Giants, 7‍–‍4	Giants; 144‍–‍113‍–‍6	Giants win 1905 World Series
1906	Giants	13‍–‍9	Giants, 6‍–‍5	Giants, 7‍–‍4	Giants; 157‍–‍122‍–‍6	
1907	Giants	12‍–‍10‍–‍1	Tie, 6‍–‍6	Giants, 6‍–‍4‍–‍1	Giants; 169‍–‍132‍–‍7	
1908	Giants	16‍–‍6	Giants, 9‍–‍2	Giants, 7‍–‍4	Giants; 185‍–‍138‍–‍7	
1909	Giants	15‍–‍7	Giants, 7‍–‍4	Giants, 8‍–‍3	Giants; 200‍–‍145‍–‍7	

1910s (Giants, 125–88–3)

Season	Season series		at Brooklyn Superbas/Robins	at New York Giants	Overall series	Notes
1910	Giants	14‍–‍8	Tie, 6‍–‍6	Giants, 8‍–‍2	Giants; 214‍–‍153‍–‍7	
1911	Giants	16‍–‍5‍–‍1	Giants, 9‍–‍2	Giants, 7‍–‍3‍–‍1	Giants; 230‍–‍158‍–‍8	Superbas change name to "Trolley Dodgers"; Giants lose 1911 World Series
1912	Giants	16‍–‍6	Giants, 8‍–‍3	Giants, 8‍–‍3	Giants; 246‍–‍164‍–‍8	Giants lose 1912 World Series
1913	Giants	14‍–‍8	Giants, 8‍–‍3	Giants, 6‍–‍5	Giants; 260‍–‍172‍–‍8	Trolley Dodgers shorten name to "Dodgers"; Giants lose 1913 World Series
1914	Giants	13‍–‍9	Giants, 8‍–‍3	Robins, 6‍–‍5	Giants; 273‍–‍181‍–‍8	Dodgers change name to "Robins"
1915	Robins	12‍–‍8	Robins, 7‍–‍4	Giants, 5‍–‍4	Giants; 281‍–‍193‍–‍8	
1916	Robins	15‍–‍7	Robins, 7‍–‍4	Robins, 8‍–‍3	Giants; 288‍–‍208‍–‍8	Robins lose 1916 World Series
1917	Giants	13‍–‍9‍–‍2	Giants, 6‍–‍3‍–‍1	Giants, 7‍–‍6‍–‍1	Giants; 301‍–‍217‍–‍10	Giants lose 1917 World Series
1918	Giants	12‍–‍8	Robins, 5‍–‍4	Giants, 8‍–‍3	Giants; 313‍–‍225‍–‍10	
1919	Giants	12‍–‍8	Giants, 7‍–‍3	Tie, 5‍–‍5	Giants; 325‍–‍233‍–‍10	

1920s (Giants, 113–106–3)

Season	Season series		at Brooklyn Robins	at New York Giants	Overall series	Notes
1920	Robins	15‍–‍7	Robins, 8‍–‍3	Robins, 7‍–‍4	Giants; 332‍–‍248‍–‍10	Robins lose 1920 World Series
1921	Robins	12‍–‍10	Robins, 7‍–‍4	Giants, 6‍–‍5	Giants; 342‍–‍260‍–‍10	Giants win 1921 World Series
1922	Giants	14‍–‍8‍–‍1	Giants, 8‍–‍4	Giants, 6‍–‍4‍–‍1	Giants; 356‍–‍268‍–‍11	Giants win 1922 World Series
1923	Tie	11‍–‍11	Robins, 6‍–‍5	Giants, 6‍–‍5	Giants; 367‍–‍279‍–‍11	Giants lose 1923 World Series
1924	Giants	14‍–‍8	Giants, 6‍–‍5	Giants, 8‍–‍3	Giants; 381‍–‍287‍–‍11	Giants lose 1924 World Series
1925	Giants	12‍–‍10	Robins, 6‍–‍5	Giants, 7‍–‍4	Giants; 393‍–‍297‍–‍11	
1926	Giants	13‍–‍9	Robins, 6‍–‍5	Giants, 8‍–‍3	Giants; 406‍–‍306‍–‍11	
1927	Giants	12‍–‍10‍–‍1	Robins, 6‍–‍5‍–‍1	Giants, 7‍–‍4	Giants; 418‍–‍316‍–‍12	
1928	Giants	13‍–‍9‍–‍1	Robins, 6‍–‍5‍–‍1	Giants, 8‍–‍3	Giants; 431‍–‍325‍–‍13	
1929	Robins	14‍–‍7	Robins, 8‍–‍3	Robins, 6‍–‍4	Giants; 438‍–‍339‍–‍13	

1930s (Giants, 120–98–2)

Season	Season series		at Brooklyn Robins/Dodgers	at New York Giants	Overall series	Notes
1930	Robins	13‍–‍9	Robins, 6‍–‍5	Robins, 7‍–‍4	Giants; 447‍–‍352‍–‍13	
1931	Tie	10‍–‍10	Robins, 6‍–‍3	Giants, 7‍–‍4	Giants; 457‍–‍362‍–‍13	
1932	Dodgers	15‍–‍7	Giants, 6‍–‍5	Dodgers, 10‍–‍1	Giants; 464‍–‍377‍–‍13	Robins change their name to "Dodgers"
1933	Giants	14‍–‍8‍–‍2	Giants, 7‍–‍4‍–‍1	Giants, 7‍–‍4‍–‍1	Giants; 478‍–‍385‍–‍15	Giants win 1933 World Series
1934	Giants	14‍–‍8	Giants, 7‍–‍4	Giants, 7‍–‍4	Giants; 492‍–‍393‍–‍15	
1935	Giants	13‍–‍9	Giants, 6‍–‍5	Giants, 7‍–‍4	Giants; 505‍–‍402‍–‍15	
1936	Giants	13‍–‍9	Dodgers, 6‍–‍5	Giants, 8‍–‍3	Giants; 518‍–‍411‍–‍15	Giants lose 1936 World Series
1937	Giants	16‍–‍6	Giants, 8‍–‍3	Giants, 8‍–‍3	Giants; 534‍–‍417‍–‍15	Giants lose 1937 World Series
1938	Giants	14‍–‍8	Giants, 7‍–‍4	Giants, 7‍–‍4	Giants; 548‍–‍425‍–‍15	Giants win 12 straight meetings (October 1937 ‍–‍ July 1938)
1939	Dodgers	12‍–‍10	Dodgers, 7‍–‍4	Giants, 6‍–‍5	Giants; 558‍–‍437‍–‍15	

1940s (Dodgers, 137–82–2)

Season	Season series		at Brooklyn Dodgers	at New York Giants	Overall series	Notes
1940	Dodgers	16‍–‍5	Dodgers, 7‍–‍3	Dodgers, 9‍–‍2	Giants; 563‍–‍453‍–‍15	
1941	Dodgers	14‍–‍8	Dodgers, 6‍–‍5	Dodgers, 8‍–‍3	Giants; 571‍–‍467‍–‍15	Dodgers lose 1941 World Series
1942	Dodgers	14‍–‍8‍–‍1	Dodgers, 9‍–‍2	Giants, 6‍–‍5‍–‍1	Giants; 579‍–‍481‍–‍16	
1943	Dodgers	14‍–‍8	Dodgers, 10‍–‍1	Giants, 7‍–‍4	Giants; 587‍–‍495‍–‍16	
1944	Giants	12‍–‍10	Dodgers, 6‍–‍5	Giants, 7‍–‍4	Giants; 599‍–‍505‍–‍16	
1945	Dodgers	15‍–‍7	Dodgers, 9‍–‍2	Dodgers, 6‍–‍5	Giants; 606‍–‍520‍–‍16	
1946	Dodgers	15‍–‍7	Dodgers, 10‍–‍1	Giants, 6‍–‍5	Giants; 613‍–‍535‍–‍16	
1947	Dodgers	14‍–‍8	Dodgers, 9‍–‍2	Giants, 6‍–‍5	Giants; 621‍–‍559‍–‍16	Dodgers 2B Jackie Robinson becomes the first African-American player in MLB history. Dodgers lose 1947 World Series
1948	Tie	11‍–‍11‍–‍1	Giants, 6‍–‍5‍–‍1	Dodgers, 6‍–‍5	Giants; 632‍–‍560‍–‍17	
1949	Dodgers	14‍–‍8	Dodgers, 8‍–‍3	Dodgers, 6‍–‍5	Giants; 640‍–‍574‍–‍17	Dodgers lose 1949 World Series

1950s (Dodgers, 117–106)

Season	Season series		at Brooklyn/Los Angeles Dodgers	at New York/San Francisco Giants	Overall series	Notes
1950	Dodgers	12‍–‍10	Dodgers, 7‍–‍5	Tie, 5‍–‍5	Giants; 650‍–‍586‍–‍17	
1951	Dodgers	14‍–‍11	Dodgers, 9‍–‍3	Giants, 8‍–‍5	Giants; 661‍–‍600‍–‍17	Giants overcome a 13 1/2 game deficit to the Dodgers late in the season and tie the Dodgers after 154 games and force a three-game tiebreaker. Giants win the series 2–1 on Bobby Thomson's game-winning home run in the ninth inning of Game 3, known as the Shot Heard 'Round the World. Giants lose 1951 World Series.
1952	Giants	14‍–‍8	Giants, 7‍–‍4	Giants, 7‍–‍4	Giants; 675‍–‍608‍–‍17	Dodgers lose 1952 World Series
1953	Dodgers	15‍–‍7	Dodgers, 8‍–‍3	Dodgers, 7‍–‍4	Giants; 682‍–‍623‍–‍17	Dodgers lose 1953 World Series
1954	Giants	13‍–‍9	Giants, 7‍–‍5	Giants, 6‍–‍4	Giants; 695‍–‍632‍–‍17	Giants win 1954 World Series
1955	Dodgers	13‍–‍9	Dodgers, 7‍–‍4	Dodgers, 6‍–‍5	Giants; 704‍–‍645‍–‍17	Dodgers win 1955 World Series
1956	Dodgers	14‍–‍8	Dodgers, 7‍–‍4	Dodgers, 7‍–‍4	Giants; 712‍–‍659‍–‍17	Dodgers lose 1956 World Series
1957	Dodgers	12‍–‍10	Dodgers, 6‍–‍5	Dodgers, 6‍–‍5	Giants; 722‍–‍671‍–‍17	Dodgers and Giants final season in New York
1958	Giants	16‍–‍6	Giants, 7‍–‍4	Giants, 9‍–‍2	Giants; 738‍–‍677‍–‍17	Dodgers and Giants relocate to Los Angeles and San Francisco, respectively
1959	Dodgers	14‍–‍8	Giants, 6‍–‍5	Dodgers, 9‍–‍2	Giants; 746‍–‍691‍–‍17	Dodgers win 1959 World Series

1960s (Giants, 108–83)

Season	Season series		at Los Angeles Dodgers	at San Francisco Giants	Overall series	Notes
1960	Giants	12‍–‍10	Dodgers, 6‍–‍5	Giants, 7‍–‍4	Giants; 758‍–‍701‍–‍17	Giants move to Candlestick Park
1961	Giants	12‍–‍10	Dodgers, 7‍–‍4	Giants, 8‍–‍3	Giants; 770‍–‍711‍–‍17	
1962	Giants	11‍–‍10	Dodgers, 7‍–‍4	Giants, 7‍–‍3	Giants; 781‍–‍721‍–‍17	Dodgers open Dodger Stadium. NL expansion reduces schedule to 18 meetings per year. Giants and Dodgers tied atop the NL after 162 games, requiring a three-game tiebreaker. Giants win the series 2–1. Giants lose 1962 World Series.
1963	Tie	9‍–‍9	Dodgers, 6‍–‍3	Giants, 6‍–‍3	Giants; 790‍–‍730‍–‍17	Dodgers win 1963 World Series
1964	Giants	12‍–‍6	Giants, 5‍–‍4	Giants, 7‍–‍2	Giants; 802‍–‍736‍–‍17	
1965	Dodgers	10‍–‍8	Dodgers, 5‍–‍4	Dodgers, 5‍–‍4	Giants; 810‍–‍746‍–‍17	Marichal‍–‍Roseboro incident. Dodgers win 1965 World Series
1966	Tie	9‍–‍9	Dodgers, 5‍–‍4	Giants, 5‍–‍4	Giants; 819‍–‍755‍–‍17	Dodgers lose 1966 World Series
1967	Giants	13‍–‍5	Giants, 8‍–‍3	Giants, 9‍–‍2	Giants; 832‍–‍760‍–‍17	
1968	Tie	9‍–‍9	Giants, 5‍–‍4	Dodgers, 5‍–‍4	Giants; 841‍–‍769‍–‍17	
1969	Giants	13‍–‍5	Giants, 8‍–‍3	Giants, 9‍–‍2	Giants; 854‍–‍774‍–‍17	

1970s (Dodgers, 108–72)

Season	Season series		at Los Angeles Dodgers	at San Francisco Giants	Overall series	Notes
1970	Tie	9‍–‍9	Giants, 5‍–‍4	Dodgers, 5‍–‍4	Giants; 863‍–‍783‍–‍17	
1971	Dodgers	12‍–‍6	Dodgers, 5‍–‍4	Dodgers, 7‍–‍2	Giants; 869‍–‍795‍–‍17	
1972	Tie	9‍–‍9	Giants, 6‍–‍3	Dodgers, 6‍–‍3	Giants; 878‍–‍804‍–‍17	
1973	Tie	9‍–‍9	Giants, 5‍–‍4	Dodgers, 5‍–‍4	Giants; 887‍–‍813‍–‍17	
1974	Dodgers	12‍–‍6	Dodgers, 5‍–‍4	Dodgers, 7‍–‍2	Giants; 893‍–‍825‍–‍17	Dodgers lose 1974 World Series
1975	Dodgers	10‍–‍8	Dodgers, 6‍–‍3	Giants, 5‍–‍4	Giants; 901‍–‍835‍–‍17	
1976	Giants	10‍–‍8	Giants, 6‍–‍3	Dodgers, 5‍–‍4	Giants; 911‍–‍843‍–‍17	
1977	Dodgers	14‍–‍4	Dodgers, 6‍–‍3	Dodgers, 8‍–‍1	Giants; 915‍–‍857‍–‍17	Dodgers win 13 straight meetings in San Francisco (August 1976 – September 1977). Dodgers lose 1977 World Series
1978	Dodgers	11‍–‍7	Dodgers, 6‍–‍3	Dodgers, 5‍–‍4	Giants; 922‍–‍868‍–‍17	Dodgers lose 1978 World Series
1979	Dodgers	14‍–‍4	Dodgers, 8‍–‍1	Dodgers, 6‍–‍3	Giants; 926‍–‍882‍–‍17	

1980s (Dodgers, 95–79)

Season	Season series		at Los Angeles Dodgers	at San Francisco Giants	Overall series	Notes
1980	Dodgers	13‍–‍5	Dodgers, 7‍–‍2	Dodgers, 6‍–‍3	Giants; 931‍–‍895‍–‍17	
1981	Dodgers	7‍–‍5	Tie, 3‍–‍3	Dodgers, 4‍–‍2	Giants; 936‍–‍902‍–‍17	Strike-shortened season results in only 12 meetings. Dodgers win 1981 World Series.
1982	Tie	9‍–‍9	Giants, 5‍–‍4	Dodgers, 5‍–‍4	Giants; 945‍–‍911‍–‍17	
1983	Giants	13‍–‍5	Giants, 6‍–‍3	Giants, 7‍–‍2	Giants; 958‍–‍916‍–‍17	
1984	Dodgers	10‍–‍8	Dodgers, 6‍–‍3	Giants, 5‍–‍4	Giants; 966‍–‍926‍–‍17	
1985	Dodgers	11‍–‍7	Dodgers, 6‍–‍3	Dodgers, 5‍–‍4	Giants; 973‍–‍937‍–‍17	
1986	Giants	10‍–‍8	Dodgers, 5‍–‍4	Giants, 6‍–‍3	Giants; 983‍–‍945‍–‍17	
1987	Dodgers	10‍–‍8	Dodgers, 5‍–‍4	Dodgers, 5‍–‍4	Giants; 991‍–‍955‍–‍17	
1988	Dodgers	12‍–‍6	Dodgers, 6‍–‍3	Dodgers, 6‍–‍3	Giants; 997‍–‍967‍–‍17	Dodgers win 1988 World Series
1989	Dodgers	10‍–‍8	Dodgers, 7‍–‍2	Giants, 6‍–‍3	Giants; 1,005‍–‍977‍–‍17	Giants lose 1989 World Series

1990s (Tie, 70–70)

Season	Season series		at Los Angeles Dodgers	at San Francisco Giants	Overall series	Notes
1990	Giants	10‍–‍8	Giants, 5‍–‍4	Giants, 5‍–‍4	Giants; 1,015‍–‍985‍–‍17	
1991	Giants	10‍–‍8	Dodgers, 5‍–‍4	Giants, 6‍–‍3	Giants; 1,025‍–‍993‍–‍17	
1992	Giants	11‍–‍7	Giants, 6‍–‍3	Giants, 5‍–‍4	Giants; 1,036‍–‍1,000‍–‍17	
1993	Dodgers	7‍–‍6	Dodgers, 4‍–‍3	Tie, 3‍–‍3	Giants; 1,042‍–‍1,007‍–‍17	NL expansion reduces schedule to 12–13 meetings per season. Dodgers defeat the Giants 12–1 in game 162 in San Francisco to eliminate the Giants from winning the NL West.
1994	Tie	5‍–‍5	Giants, 2‍–‍1	Dodgers, 4‍–‍3	Giants; 1,047‍–‍1,012‍–‍17	Strike-shortened season
1995	Dodgers	8‍–‍5	Dodgers, 5‍–‍1	Giants, 4‍–‍3	Giants; 1,052‍–‍1,020‍–‍17	Strike-shortened season
1996	Dodgers	7‍–‍6	Dodgers, 4‍–‍3	Tie, 3‍–‍3	Giants; 1,058‍–‍1,027‍–‍17	
1997	Tie	6‍–‍6	Dodgers, 4‍–‍2	Giants, 4‍–‍2	Giants; 1,064‍–‍1,033‍–‍17	
1998	Tie	6‍–‍6	Dodgers, 4‍–‍2	Giants, 4‍–‍2	Giants; 1,070‍–‍1,039‍–‍17	
1999	Dodgers	8‍–‍5	Dodgers, 4‍–‍3	Dodgers, 4‍–‍2	Giants; 1,075‍–‍1,047‍–‍17	Giants final season in Candlestick Park

2000s (Dodgers, 94–86)

Season	Season series		at Los Angeles Dodgers	at San Francisco Giants	Overall series	Notes
2000	Dodgers	7‍–‍5	Tie, 3‍–‍3	Dodgers, 4‍–‍2	Giants; 1,080‍–‍1,054‍–‍17	Giants open Pacific Bell Park (now known as Oracle Park).
2001	Dodgers	11‍–‍8	Dodgers, 6‍–‍4	Dodgers, 5‍–‍4	Giants; 1,088‍–‍1,065‍–‍17	MLB changes to an "unbalanced schedule", resulting in 18–19 meetings per year. Giants' LF Barry Bonds sets the record for home runs in a season with 73.
2002	Giants	11‍–‍8	Giants, 7‍–‍3	Dodgers, 5‍–‍4	Giants; 1,099‍–‍1,073‍–‍17	Giants lose 2002 World Series
2003	Giants	13‍–‍6	Giants, 5‍–‍4	Giants, 8‍–‍2	Giants; 1,112‍–‍1,079‍–‍17	Dodgers' P Eric Gagne converts 55 of 55 save opportunities, tying the NL record for saves in a season. This was part of a string of 84 consecutive saves from 2002 to 2004.
2004	Dodgers	10‍–‍9	Dodgers, 5‍–‍4	Tie, 5‍–‍5	Giants; 1,121‍–‍1,089‍–‍17	
2005	Giants	10‍–‍9	Dodgers, 5‍–‍4	Giants, 6‍–‍4	Giants; 1,131‍–‍1,098‍–‍17	
2006	Dodgers	13‍–‍6	Dodgers, 6‍–‍4	Dodgers, 7‍–‍2	Giants; 1,137‍–‍1,111‍–‍17	
2007	Dodgers	10‍–‍8	Giants, 6‍–‍3	Dodgers, 7‍–‍2	Giants; 1,145‍–‍1,121‍–‍17	Dodgers win 11 straight games in San Francisco (August 2006 – July 2007). Giants LF Barry Bonds sets career home run record with 762.
2008	Tie	9‍–‍9	Dodgers, 5‍–‍4	Giants, 5‍–‍4	Giants; 1,154‍–‍1,130‍–‍17	
2009	Dodgers	11‍–‍7	Dodgers, 6‍–‍3	Giants, 5‍–‍4	Giants; 1,161‍–‍1,141‍–‍17	

2010s (Giants, 95–92)

Season	Season series		at Los Angeles Dodgers	at San Francisco Giants	Overall series	Notes
2010	Giants	10‍–‍8	Giants, 5‍–‍4	Giants, 5‍–‍4	Giants; 1,171‍–‍1,149‍–‍17	Giants win 2010 World Series
2011	Tie	9‍–‍9	Dodgers, 5‍–‍4	Giants, 5‍–‍4	Giants; 1,180‍–‍1,158‍–‍17	
2012	Giants	10‍–‍8	Giants, 5‍–‍4	Giants, 5‍–‍4	Giants; 1,190‍–‍1,166‍–‍17	Giants win 2012 World Series
2013	Giants	11‍–‍8	Tie, 5‍–‍5	Giants, 6‍–‍3	Giants; 1,201‍–‍1,174‍–‍17	Both AL and NL have balanced teams, which leads to a balanced schedule of 19 games per season.
2014	Dodgers	10‍–‍9	Giants, 6‍–‍4	Dodgers, 6‍–‍3	Giants; 1,210‍–‍1,184‍–‍17	First season in which both teams qualify for the postseason. Giants win 2014 World Series.
2015	Giants	11‍–‍8	Dodgers, 6‍–‍3	Giants, 8‍–‍2	Giants; 1,221‍–‍1,192‍–‍17	
2016	Giants	11‍–‍8	Dodgers, 6‍–‍3	Giants, 8‍–‍2	Giants; 1,232‍–‍1,200‍–‍17	Second season in which both teams qualify for the postseason. Giants defeat the Dodgers in San Francisco in game 162 to clinch the final NL Wild Card spot.
2017	Dodgers	11‍–‍8	Dodgers, 6‍–‍3	Tie, 5‍–‍5	Giants; 1,240‍–‍1,211‍–‍17	Dodgers lose 2017 World Series
2018	Dodgers	10‍–‍9	Tie, 5‍–‍5	Dodgers, 5‍–‍4	Giants; 1,249‍–‍1,221‍–‍17	Dodgers lose 2018 World Series
2019	Dodgers	12‍–‍7	Dodgers, 6‍–‍4	Dodgers, 6‍–‍3	Giants; 1,256‍–‍1,233‍–‍17	

2020s (Dodgers, 67–38)

Season	Season series		at Los Angeles Dodgers	at San Francisco Giants	Overall series	Notes
2020	Dodgers	6‍–‍4	Dodgers, 4‍–‍3	Dodgers, 2‍–‍1	Giants; 1,260‍–‍1,239‍–‍17	Season shortened to 60 games (with 10 meetings) due to COVID-19 pandemic. Mookie Betts signs with the Dodgers. The penultimate game of the season series in San Francisco was deliberately postponed due to players on both teams protesting the Shooting of Jacob Blake as part of the Black Lives Matter movement. The last two games were played as a seven-inning doubleheader, in which the Dodgers shut out the Giants in both games. Dodgers win 2020 World Series.
2021	Giants	10‍–‍9	Giants, 6‍–‍4	Dodgers, 5‍–‍4	Giants; 1,270‍–‍1,248‍–‍17	Jimmie Sherfy became the first pitcher to ever appear in games for both the San Francisco Giants and Los Angeles Dodgers in the same season. No pitcher had appeared in games for both franchises since 1943 when Bill Sayles pitched for the New York Giants and Brooklyn Dodgers. Giants and Dodgers led MLB with 107 and 106 wins, respectively.
2021 NLDS	Dodgers	3‍–‍2	Tie, 1‍–‍1	Dodgers, 2‍–‍1	Giants; 1,272‍–‍1,251‍–‍17	First modern postseason meeting
2022	Dodgers	15‍–‍4	Dodgers, 8‍–‍1	Dodgers, 7‍–‍3	Giants; 1,276‍–‍1,266‍–‍17	Dodgers complete consecutive four-game sweeps at home and on the road (their first in San Francisco since 1977). The Dodgers finish the season 15–4 against the Giants, their most wins against them in a season since moving to Los Angeles in 1958.
2023	Dodgers	7‍–‍6	Giants, 4‍–‍3	Dodgers, 4‍–‍2	Giants; 1,282‍–‍1,273‍–‍17	Giants shutout Dodgers 15‍–‍0 at Dodger Stadium on June 17, their largest shutout defeat at home in 125 years (worst home loss since moving to California)
2024	Dodgers	9‍–‍4	Dodgers, 6‍–‍1	Tie, 3‍–‍3	Giants; 1,286‍–‍1,282‍–‍17	Dodgers win 2024 World Series
2025	Dodgers	9‍–‍4	Dodgers, 5‍–‍2	Dodgers, 4‍–‍2	Dodgers; 1,291‍–‍1,290‍–‍17	Dodgers tie the all-time regular season series head to head on September 19, Clayton Kershaw's final home start at Dodger Stadium. The next day, the Dodgers take the regular season series head-to-head for the first time since August 8, 1896. The following day, Giants re-tie series. Dodgers win 2025 World Series
2026	Dodgers	9‍–‍4	Dodgers, 5‍–‍2	Dodgers, 4‍–‍2	Dodgers; 1,300‍–‍1,294‍–‍17	The Dodgers finished the season leading both the regular season and overall head-to-head record, for the first time since 1895.
2027	Tie	0‍–‍0	Upcoming at Dodgers, May 6‍–‍9, July 30‍–‍August 1	Upcoming at Giants, June 14‍–‍16, August 6‍–‍8	Dodgers; 1,300‍–‍1,294‍–‍17	

Summary of Results

Season	Season series		at Brooklyn/Los Angeles Dodgers	at New York/San Francisco Giants	Notes
Brooklyn Dodgers vs New York Giants	Giants	722‍–‍671‍–‍17	Dodgers, 364‍–‍336‍–‍8	Giants, 386‍–‍307‍–‍9	
Los Angeles Dodgers vs San Francisco Giants	Dodgers	629‍–‍572	Dodgers, 336‍–‍268	Giants, 304‍–‍293	
Overall Regular Season	Dodgers	1,297‍–‍1,292‍–‍17	Dodgers, 699‍–‍603‍–‍8	Giants, 689‍–‍598‍–‍9	
Postseason games	Dodgers	3‍–‍2	Tie, 1‍–‍1	Dodgers, 2‍–‍1	NLDS: 2021
Postseason series	Dodgers	1‍–‍0			NLDS: 2021
Overall Regular Season and Postseason	Dodgers	1,300‍–‍1,294‍–‍17	Dodgers, 900‍–‍604‍–‍8	Giants, 690‍–‍600‍–‍9	

== Fan reaction ==
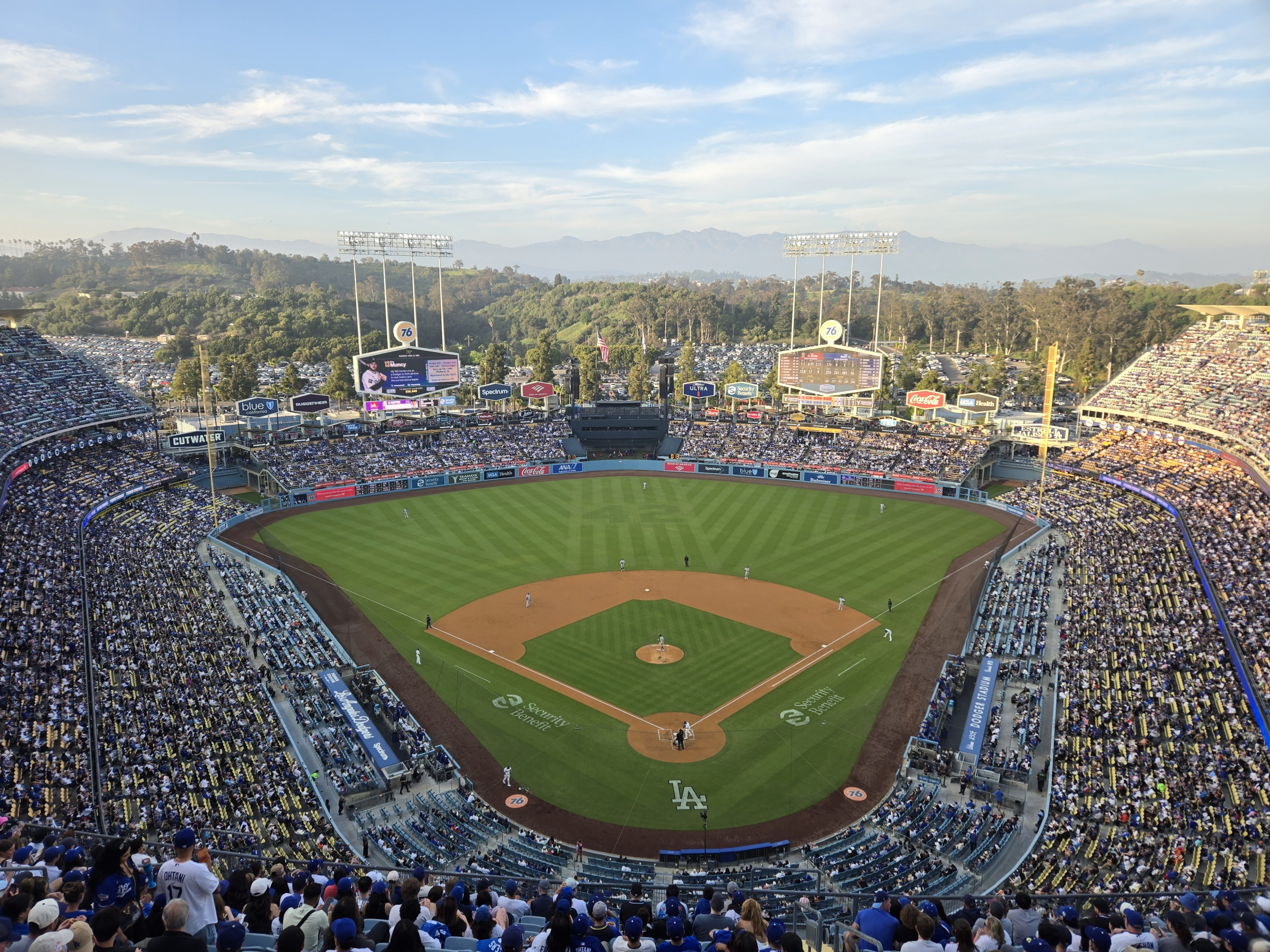
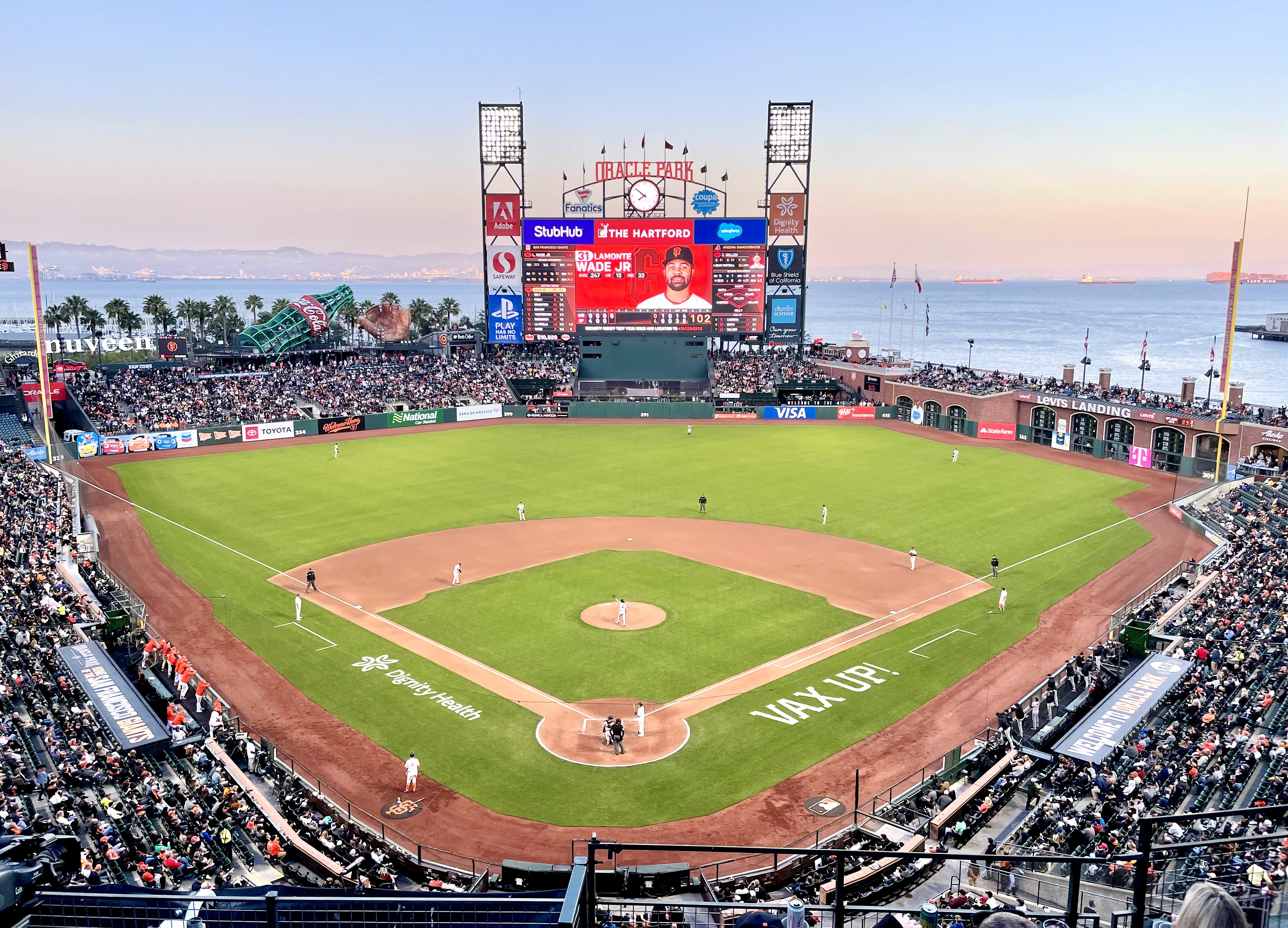
Dodger Stadium (left), the home of the Los Angeles Dodgers, and Oracle Park (right), home of the San Francisco Giants

Ardent fans of each club are likely to consider the other as their "most hated" rival, enjoying the other team's misfortune almost as much as their own team's success. A typical Giants fan may just as soon ask "Did the Dodgers lose?" as they would "Did the Giants win?" and vice versa. This view is supported by the consistently solid attendance figures for Giants-Dodgers games at both home fields, and increased media coverage as well. A good example of this is that during the final 3 game Dodgers-Giants series in 1991, the Giants drew over 150,000 fans. The attendance for these 3 games represented almost 1/10 of their total fans (1.7 million) for the entire 81 game home schedule, and prompted at least one reporter on ESPN to wonder if the euphoria in the Bay Area following the games reflected a delusion that the Giants had won the World Series rather than simply knocking the Dodgers out. In 2009, Forbes rated the Giants-Dodgers rivalry the most intense rivalry in baseball due to its lasting competitiveness through the 20th century and both fanbases' willingness to be overcharged for Dodgers-Giants game tickets with a ticket markup of 44% for the 2008 season.

During games in Los Angeles, Dodgers fans will chant "Beat the Bay" when the Giants are in town and also used to chant "Barry Sucks", referring to former Giants outfielder Barry Bonds, often even when Bonds was not at bat or involved in a defensive play. Los Angeles fans were also known to chant "Maddy Sucks" to taunt former pitcher Madison Bumgarner, even after he signed with the Arizona Diamondbacks in 2019. In San Francisco, Giants fans will chant "Beat L.A." and the stadium used to have their screens read "Duck the Fodgers" when they were in town. A recent expression of these feelings was the 2007 All-Star Game in San Francisco, where the three Dodgers All-Stars (catcher Russell Martin and pitchers Brad Penny and Takashi Saito) were roundly booed by partisan fans throughout the festivities. During the final rounds of the 2013 World Baseball Classic, held at San Francisco's AT&T Park, Dodgers infielder Hanley Ramírez, competing for his home country, the Dominican Republic, was consistently booed at every appearance and whenever his name was mentioned on the public-address system.

During the 2022 All-Star Game in Los Angeles, ex-Dodger Joc Pederson (who had signed with the Giants that offseason) was the only member of the Giants selected to the All-Star game, as a result he was loudly booed by the Los Angeles fans when he was announced on the batting order. Due to the strong animosity between the teams, Dodgers fans have often grown increasingly hostile towards Giants fans attending Dodgers’ home games, prompting many to strongly discourage entering the ballpark with Giants’ hats or shirts in the aftermath of the Brian Stow beating.

== Player reaction ==
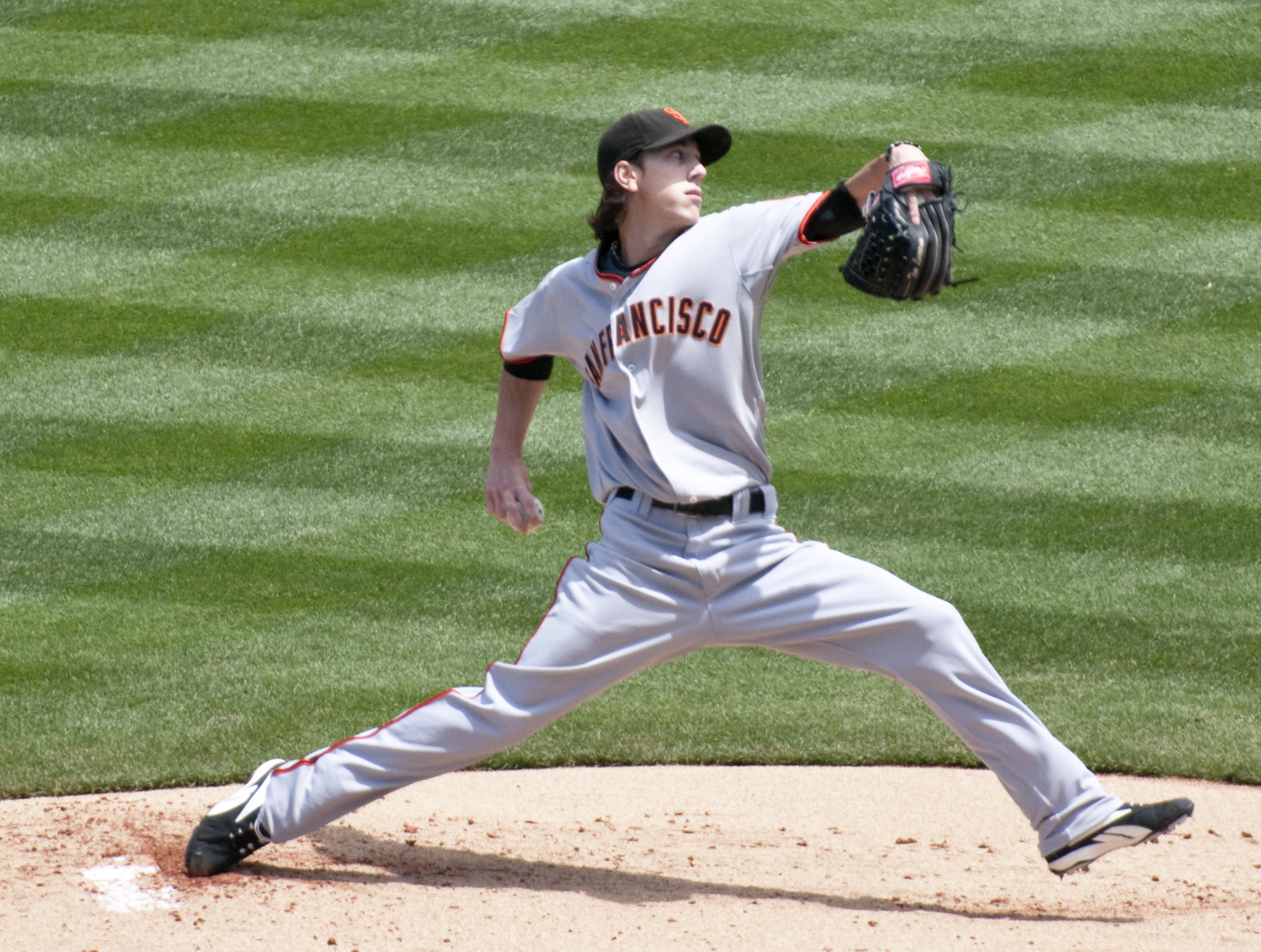
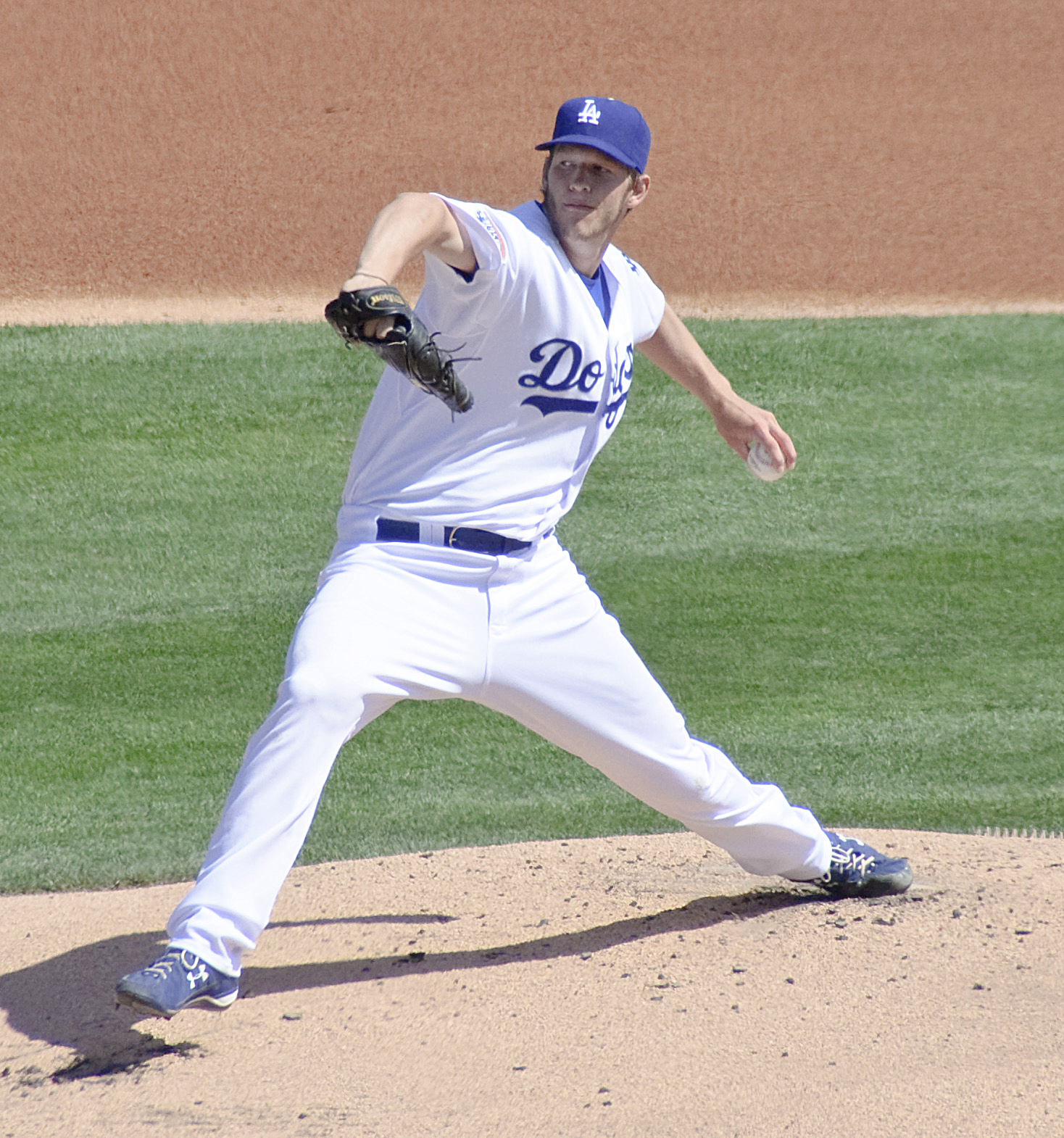
The Giants' Tim Lincecum and the Dodgers' Clayton Kershaw combined to win five of seven NL Cy Young Awards between 2008 and 2014, adding fuel to the rivalry.

The rivalry extends to players as well. Jackie Robinson retired rather than report to the Giants after being traded to them by the Dodgers in December of 1956. According to legend and his teammate Tommy Lasorda, he did so because he had come to hate the Giants after ten years in Dodger Blue. This notion has been challenged on the grounds that Robinson would have been 38 years old when the new season began (and suffering from diabetes), and simply decided to retire. Nevertheless, in a gesture that transcends this heated rivalry, Robinson's retired blue Dodgers numeral '42' hangs in the Giants' home ballpark, Oracle Park, just as it does at all other MLB ballparks in remembrance of Robinson's breaking the color barrier in Major League Baseball.

Both teams play in the National League West division, and due to the unbalanced schedule, (formerly) played 19 head-to-head games each year. This is comparable to the 22 games each year that they faced each other in New York and Brooklyn. The matchups were then reduced in 2023 to 13 games, due to a more balanced schedule that enables every team to play the other 29 opponents at least one series per season.

In 2014, the rivalry intensified when Dodgers outfielder Yasiel Puig flipped his bat when hitting a home run off of Giants pitcher Madison Bumgarner. Since then, the two players had sparked some bench clearing incidents until Puig was traded to the Cincinnati Reds following the 2018 season. The Rivalry still exhibited notable moments following Puig's trade to the Reds.

On June 9, 2019, Dodgers’ infielder Max Muncy hit a home run off of Bumgarner into McCovey Cove. Muncy jokingly stared at the ball as it sailed over the outfield line, imitating Babe Ruth. As Muncy rounded the bases, Bumgarner seemed visually unimpressed and began trading insults with Muncy as he rounded the bases. Once returned to home plate, Muncy retorted "If you don’t like it, you can go get it out of the ocean!". On April 12, 2023, after Muncy hit two home runs in a 10–5 Dodger victory at Oracle Park, he stated in a post-game interview that "I don't like this place. It's cold and windy all the time... But I do hit good here. I don't understand why, but I'm not going to complain about it."

== Notorious incidents ==
=== Marichal–Roseboro incident ===
At Candlestick Park on August 22, 1965, Giants pitcher Juan Marichal was involved in a major altercation with Dodgers catcher John Roseboro. The Dodgers were involved in a tight pennant race late in the season, entering the game leading the Milwaukee Braves by 1/2 game and the Giants by 1 1/2 games.

Maury Wills led off the game with a bunt single off Marichal and, eventually scored a run when Ron Fairly hit a double. Marichal, a fierce competitor, viewed the bunt as a cheap way to get on base and took umbrage with Wills. When Wills came up to bat in the second inning, Marichal threw a pitch directly at Wills sending him sprawling to the ground. Willie Mays then led off the bottom of the second inning for the Giants and Dodgers' pitcher Sandy Koufax threw a pitch over Mays' head as a token form of retaliation. In the top of the third inning, Marichal threw a fastball that came close to hitting Fairly, prompting him to dive to the ground. Marichal's act angered the Dodgers sitting in the dugout and home plate umpire Shag Crawford then warned both teams that any further retaliations would not be tolerated.

Marichal came to bat in the third inning expecting Koufax to take further retaliation against him but instead, he was startled when Roseboro's return throw to Koufax after the second pitch either brushed his ear or came close enough for him to feel the breeze off the ball. When Marichal confronted Roseboro about the proximity of his throw, Roseboro came out of his crouch with his fists clenched. Marichal afterwards stated that he thought Roseboro was about to attack him and raised his bat, striking Roseboro at least twice over the head with his bat, opening a two-inch gash that sent blood flowing down the catcher's face that required 14 stitches. Koufax raced in from the mound to attempt to separate them and was joined by the umpires, players and coaches from both teams. A 14-minute brawl ensued on the field before Koufax, Mays, and others restored order. Marichal was ejected from the game and afterwards, National League president Warren Giles suspended him for eight games, fined him a then-NL record US$1,750 (equivalent to $17,879 in 2025), and also forbade him from traveling to Dodger Stadium for the final, crucial two-game series of the season. Roseboro filed a $110,000 damage suit against Marichal one week after the incident but, eventually settled out of court for $7,500.

Marichal did not face the Dodgers again until spring training on April 3, 1966. In his first at bat against Marichal since the incident, Roseboro hit a three-run home run. Giants general manager Chub Feeney approached Dodgers general manager Buzzy Bavasi to attempt to arrange a handshake between Marichal and Roseboro; however, Roseboro declined the offer. Years later, Roseboro stated that he was retaliating for Marichal having thrown at Wills. He explained that, due to the benches being warned, he did not want to risk Koufax getting ejected or suspended in the middle of a pennant race and decided to take matters into his own hands. He further stated that his throwing close to Marichal's ear was, "standard operating procedure", as a form of retribution.

Dodgers fans were angry at Marichal for several years after the violent incident, and reacted unfavorably when he was signed by the Dodgers in 1975. However, by this time Roseboro had forgiven Marichal, and personally appealed to the fans to calm down. After years of bitterness, Roseboro and Marichal became close friends in the 1980s, getting together occasionally at Old-Timers games, golf tournaments, and charity events. Roseboro also personally appealed to the Baseball Writers' Association of America not to hold the incident against Marichal after it passed him over for election to the Hall of Fame two years in a row. Marichal was elected in 1983, and thanked Roseboro in his induction speech. When Roseboro died in 2002, Marichal served as an honorary pallbearer and told the gathered, "Johnny's forgiving me was one of the best things that happened in my life. I wish I could have had John Roseboro as my catcher."

=== Reggie Smith incident ===
In the 1981 season as a member of the Dodgers, Reggie Smith was taunted by Giants fan Michael Dooley, who then threw a batting helmet at him. Smith then jumped into the stands at Candlestick Park and started punching him. He was ejected from the game, and Dooley was arrested. Five months later, Smith joined the Giants as a free agent.

== Fan violence ==
There have been occasional instances of fan violence between fans of the two teams. Before the Giants moved away from Candlestick Park, fights would occur frequently, especially toward the ends of late games. At AT&T Park, the team introduced reforms intended to mitigate fights or other safety issues, including stopping beer sales after the seventh inning, or earlier if fans appear especially rowdy, and providing a system for people to anonymously report unruly fans. Incidents continued to occur, both in San Francisco and Los Angeles.

=== Death of Marc Antenocruz ===
Giants fan Marc Antenorcruz was shot and killed by Dodgers fan Pete Marron on September 19, 2003, in the parking lot of Dodger Stadium, following a late-season Dodgers-Giants game. Marron was convicted of first degree murder and sentenced to 50 years in prison. A second defendant, Manuel Hernandez, pleaded no contest to voluntary manslaughter and had his 15-year sentence suspended.

=== 2009 Opening Day stabbing ===
In 2009, Arthur Alvarez, a reputed gang member, went to the Dodgers’ home opener with a couple and another man. After the game, Alverez and the other man, a Dodgers fan, began quarreling in the stadium parking lot. Alvarez stabbed the 30-year-old victim several times in the arm, back, and torso. He was arrested in May for suspicion of attempted murder. The trial by jury, held in August 2009, acquitted Alvarez on the charge of attempted murder.

=== Bryan Stow beating ===
On March 31, 2011, a 42-year-old Giants fan, Bryan Stow of Santa Cruz, California, was critically injured when he was beaten by two Dodgers fans in the Dodger Stadium parking lot after the Dodgers and Giants opened the 2011 season. The suspects subsequently fled the scene in a vehicle driven by a woman. Stow sustained severe injuries to his skull and brain and was placed into a medically induced coma after the incident. An early suspect, a 31-year-old man was arrested in his East Hollywood home in May 2011 in connection with the crime. The man was never formally charged and was declared innocent in July 2011 when Louie Sanchez and Marvin Norwood, of Rialto, were arrested and charged in the crime. Lawyers for Stow say his medical care is expected to cost more than $50 million. On May 24, 2011, Stow's family filed a lawsuit against the Los Angeles Dodgers for $37.5 million for his lifetime care and compensation of lost earnings.

On September 27, 2011, relatives reported that Stow showed signs of improvement. Stow began an intensive therapy program in the Rehabilitation Trauma Center at Santa Clara Valley Medical Center on October 11. Doctors have told his family that he will never fully recover. On December 19, 2011, NBC aired the interview with Stow on the program Rock Center with Brian Williams. On October 25, 2012, he attended Game 2 of the 2012 World Series in San Francisco.

In April 2013, Stow's insurance company stopped paying for his full-time care in a residential rehabilitation facility and he moved into his parents' home in Capitola, California. Stow returned home on June 13, 2013, for the first time since the attack two years earlier.

On February 20, 2014, Sanchez and Norwood pleaded guilty. Under the plea bargain, Sanchez was sentenced to eight years in prison for felony mayhem and Norwood received four years for felony assault. On July 9, 2014, a jury found the Dodgers organization negligent in Stow's beating. The jury awarded $18 million in damages to Stow; the Dodgers are responsible for $13.9 million of this total. The remaining amount is to be split between Sanchez and Norwood.

On April 9, 2021, Stow threw the ceremonial first pitch for the Giants’ home opener against the Colorado Rockies.

=== Death of Jonathan Denver ===
On September 25, 2013, after a Dodgers-Giants night game in San Francisco, a man, claiming self-defense, stabbed a Dodgers fan to death six blocks from AT&T Park. The San Francisco medical examiner's office identified the deceased man as Jonathan Denver, 24, of Fort Bragg, California.

Two people were arrested in connection with Denver's death. San Francisco Police Chief Greg Suhr told the San Francisco Chronicle earlier that the victim of the attack was a Dodgers fan and was wearing Dodgers gear. Michael Montgomery, 21, of Lodi was arrested on suspicion of murder. Montgomery was later released, prosecutors citing insufficient evidence to charge him. His father claimed the stabbing was done in self-defense.

On March 12, 2014, San Francisco District Attorney George Gascón said that his office could not prove that Michael Montgomery did not act in self-defense when he stabbed Denver. According to Gascón, both Denver and his brother collectively weighed about 150 pounds more than Montgomery. According to witnesses, Montgomery had a bottle in his hand for self-defense while Denver was punching him. After Denver's brother grabbed an aluminium chair and hit Montgomery on the head with it, Montgomery dropped the bottle, took out a knife, and stabbed Denver. San Francisco prosecutors ultimately declined to file charges in connection with the case. Gascón would become the Los Angeles District Attorney in 2020.

== See also ==
- Angels–Athletics rivalry
- 49ers–Rams rivalry
- Chargers–Raiders rivalry
- Lakers–Warriors rivalry
- Kings–Sharks rivalry
- California Clásico
- Major League Baseball rivalries
- 1889 World Series
