= Santa Clara Valley Medical Center =

Coordinates: 37°18′48″N 121°56′2″W

- Santa Clara County Health System

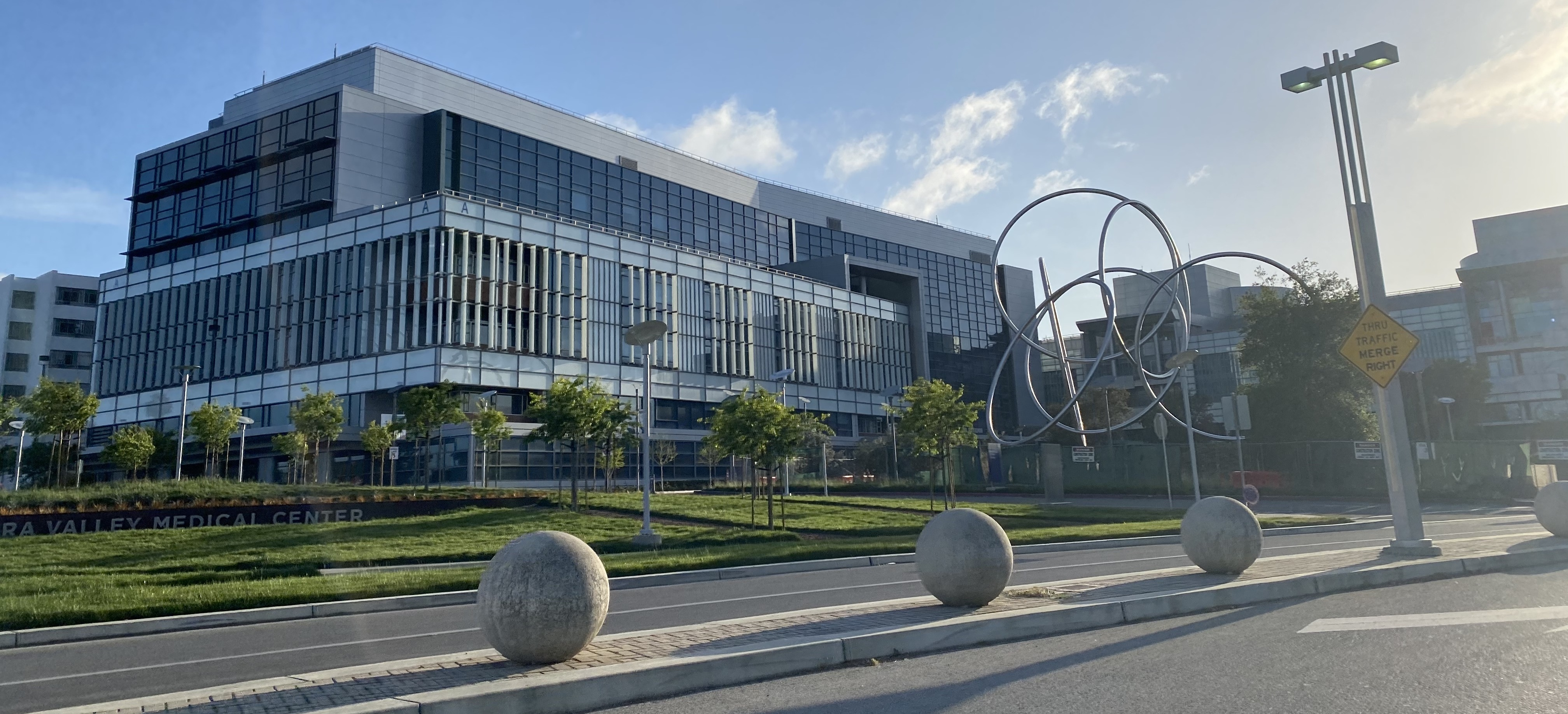

Geography
- Location: 751 South Bascom Avenue, Santa Clara County, California, United States

Organization
- Care system: Public
- Type: Teaching
- Affiliated university: Stanford University School of Medicine

Services
- Emergency department: Level I Adult Trauma Center / Level II Pediatric Trauma Center
- Beds: 731

History
- Founded: 1876; 150 years ago

Links
- Website: scvmc.scvh.org
- Lists: Hospitals in the United States

Santa Clara Valley Medical Center, commonly known as Valley Medical Center or simply Valley Medical, is a prominent 731-bed public tertiary, teaching, and research hospital in Santa Clara County, California. Located in the unincorporated Fruitdale neighborhood of West San Jose, Valley Medical Center is the anchor facility of the Santa Clara County Health System, serving Santa Clara County. Valley Medical is home to numerous innovative research and care centers, such as the Rehabilitation Trauma Center, the only federally-designated spinal cord injury center in Northern California.

== History ==
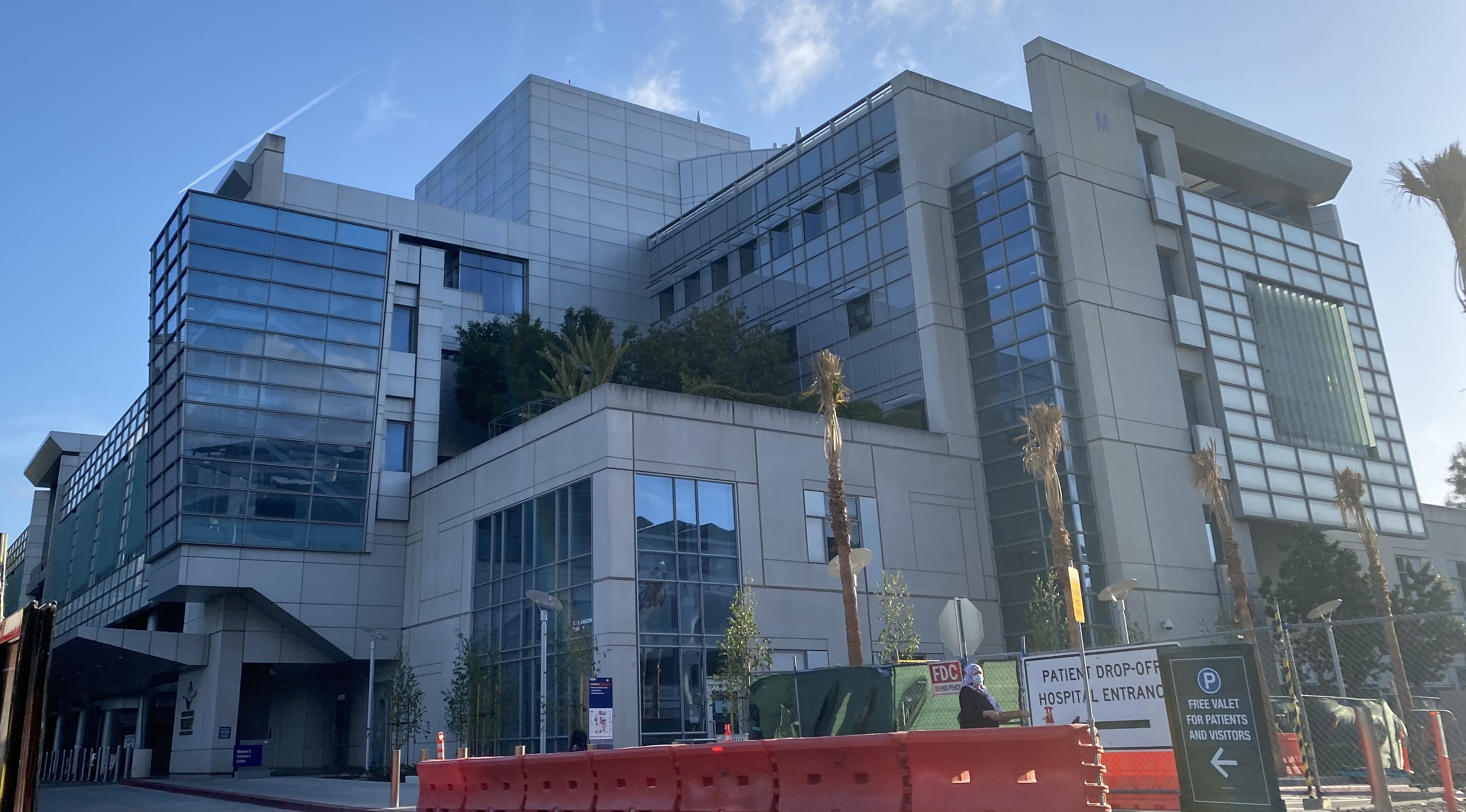
Women & Children's Center.

The campus and hospital were founded at its present location in 1876 by Dr. Benjamin Cory, the Director of Public Health. Founded as the County Hospital, it was the first organized hospital in the San Francisco Bay Area. The current campus continues to sit at the very same spot where the original hospital was constructed in the 19th century. This has led to issues with construction on site with the February 2012 unearthing of an 1870-1920s pauper's grave site.

== Trauma and emergency care ==
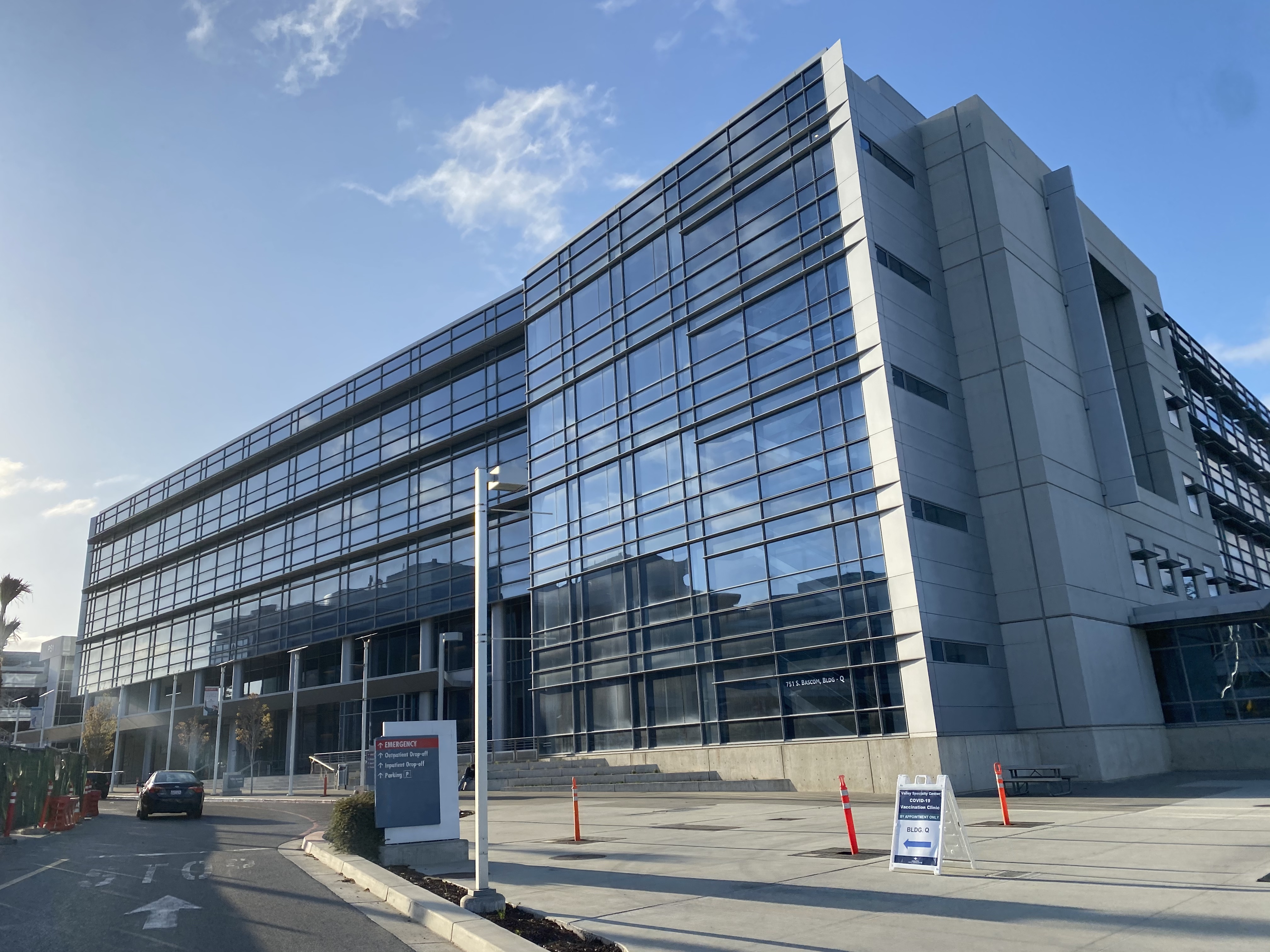
Valley Specialty Center.

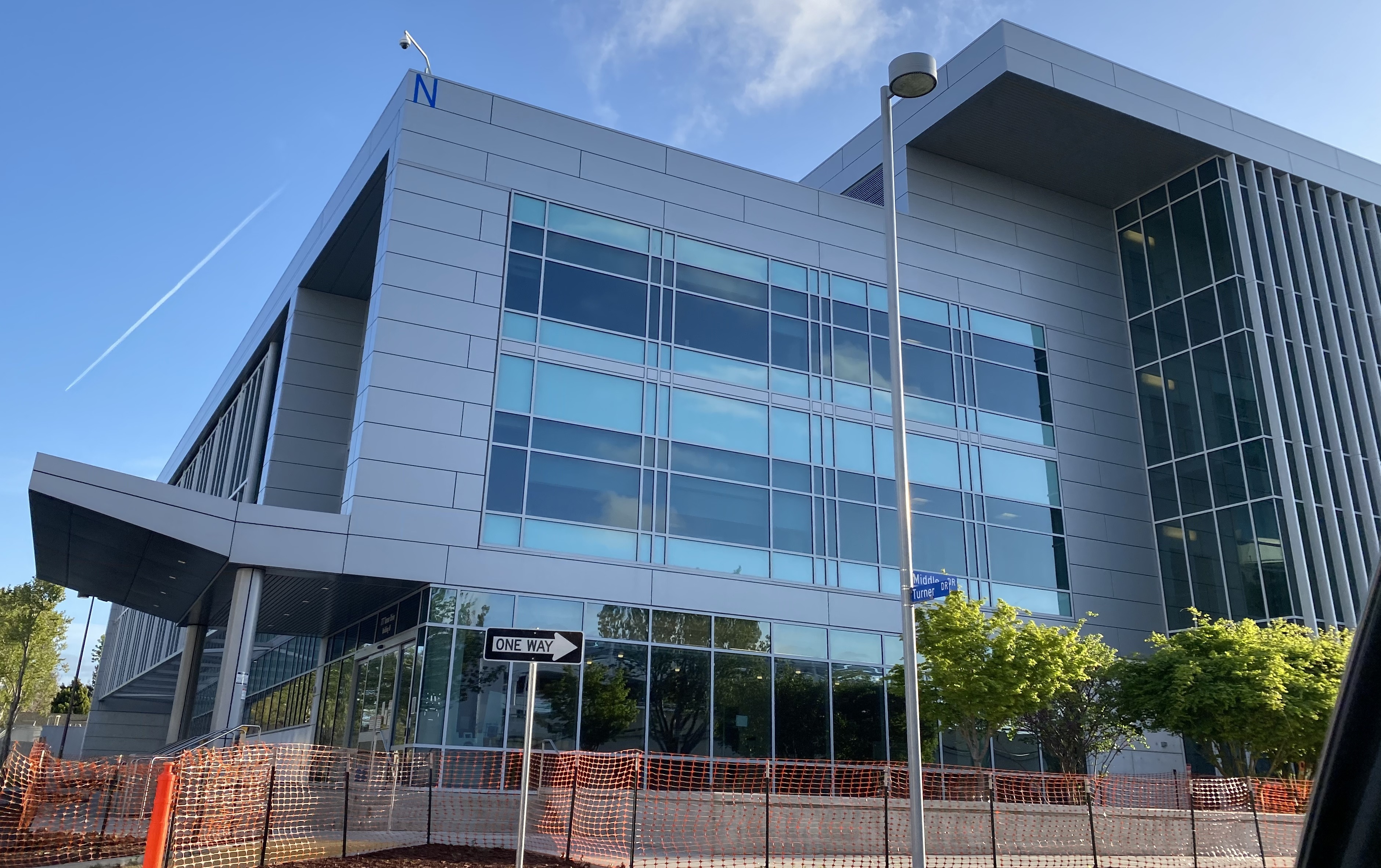
Receiving & Support Center.

Santa Clara Valley Medical Center is one of five adult level one trauma centers in Northern California, along with Stanford University Medical Center in northwestern Santa Clara County, San Francisco General Hospital in San Francisco, Highland Hospital (Alameda County) in Oakland, and UC Davis Medical Center in Sacramento. It also is one of four pediatric trauma centers in Northern California. It operates the only federally designated spinal cord injury center in Northern California, the Rehabilitation Trauma Center, along with the only traumatic brain injury center for the treatment and rehabilitation of patients. It operates one of four burn centers in Northern California. It is the only trauma center in California to co-locate all five of these services on one campus.

Santa Clara Valley Medical Center operates numerous critical care units including the highest level neonatal intensive care unit. The medical center also is licensed for cardiovascular surgery and cardiac catheterization. It is designated a primary stroke treatment center by the Joint Commission on Accreditation of Health Organizations. In addition, the Medical Center operates onsite outpatient clinics and satellite clinics in Central San Jose, East San Jose, South San Jose, as well as the suburbs of Sunnyvale, Gilroy, and Milpitas.

== Residencies ==
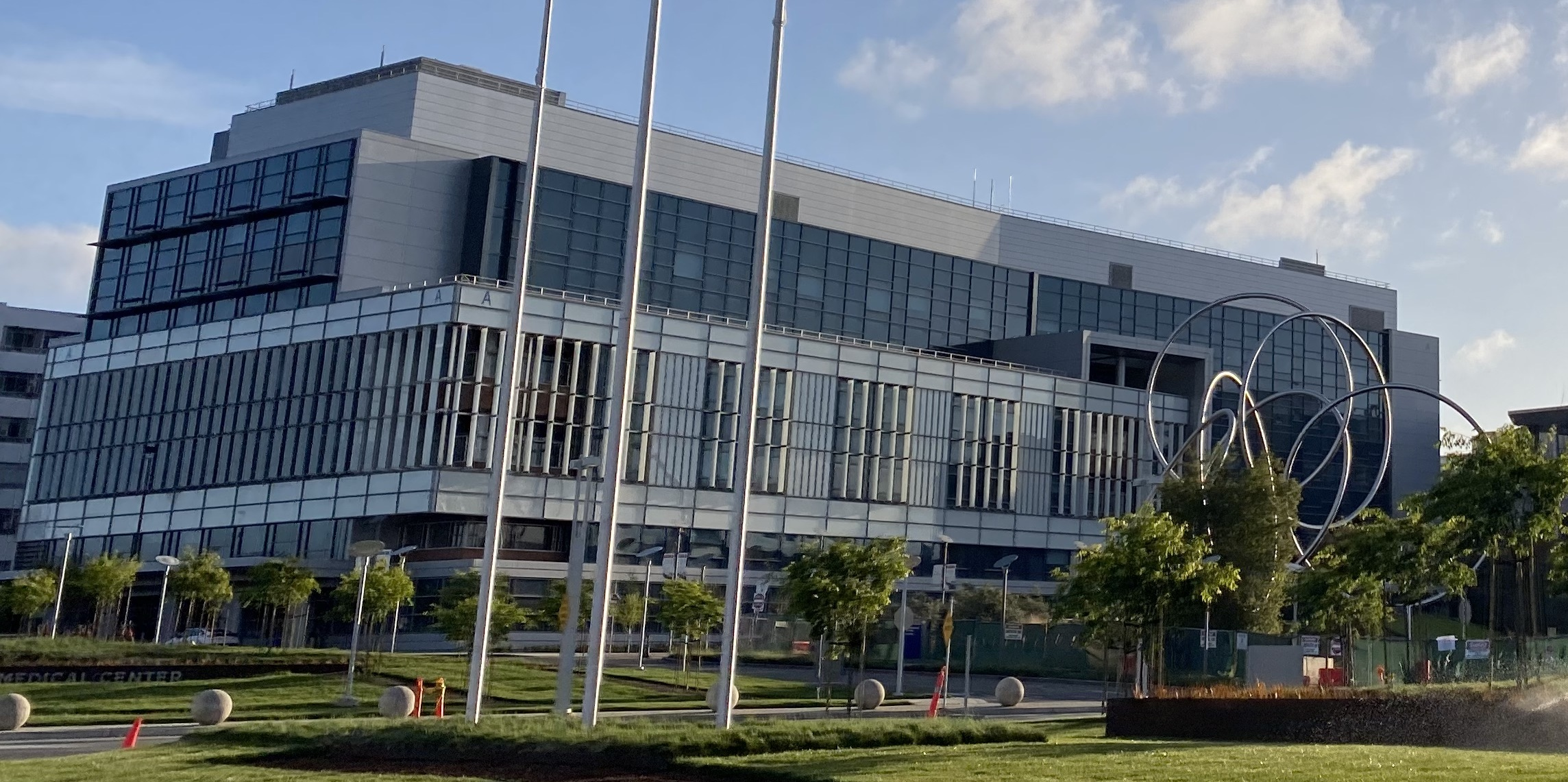
Sobrato Pavilion.

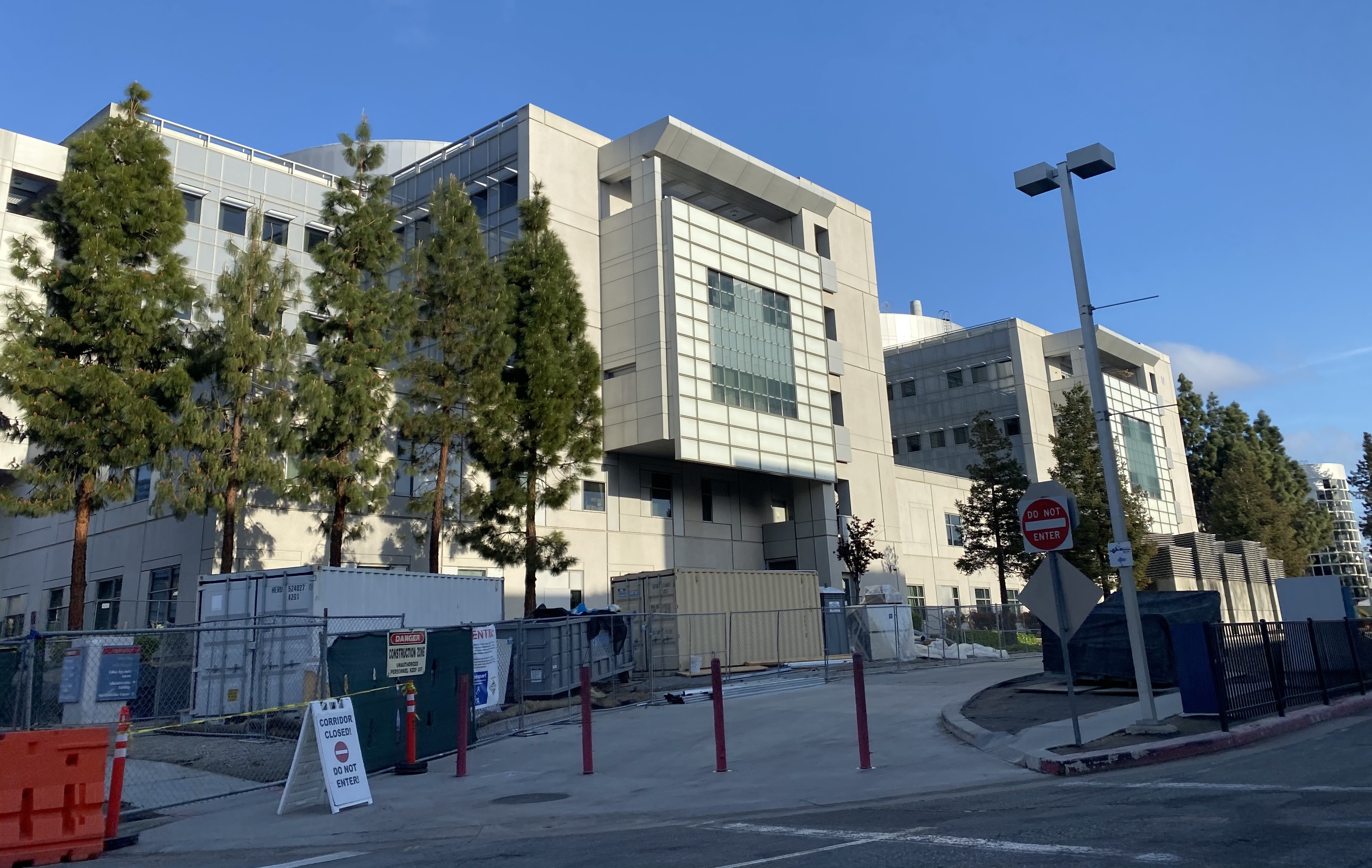
Emergency Room entrance.

Residency programs operated by Santa Clara Valley Medical Center include internal medicine, obstetrics/gynecology, radiology, and pharmacy. Residents in anesthesiology, dermatology, emergency medicine, general surgery, neurology, ophthalmology, orthopedic surgery, pediatrics, physical medicine & rehabilitation, plastic surgery, radiation oncology, and urology from Stanford Medical School all rotate through Santa Clara Valley Medical Center.

Residents in infectious diseases from the Kaiser Permanente Medical Program rotate through Santa Clara Valley Medical Center, as do members of the occupational medicine program from UC San Francisco.

== Hospital rating data ==
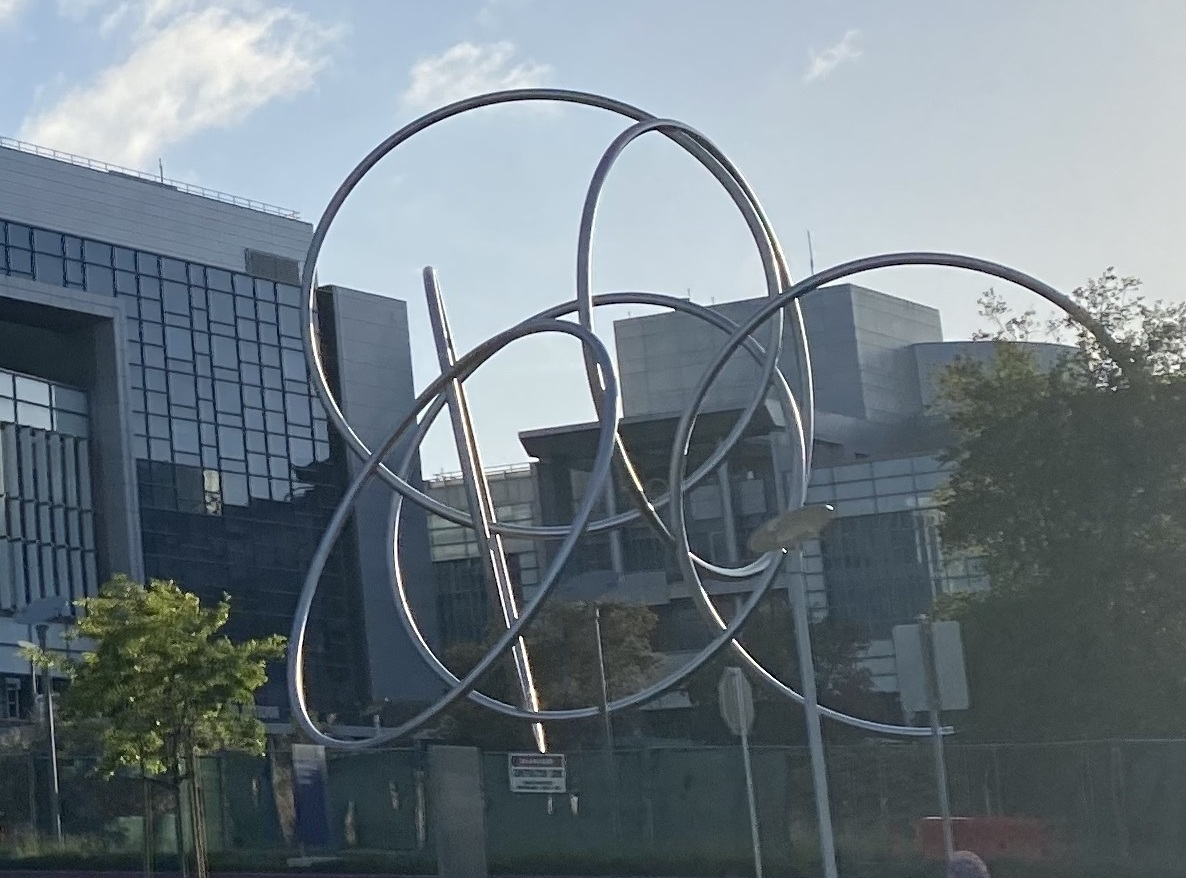
The 22 foot-tall sculpture Sanctuary by artist Bruce Beasley.

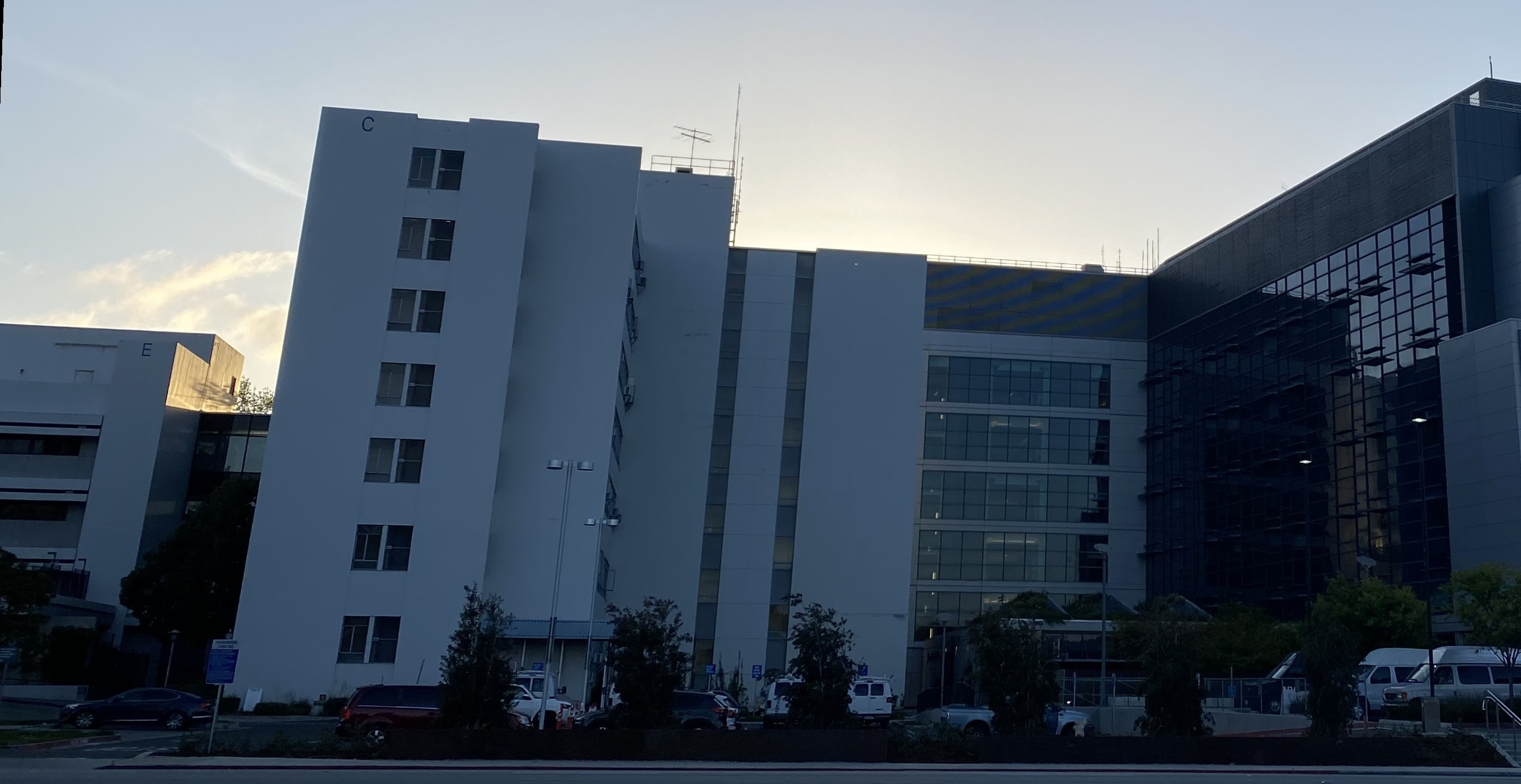
Old Main and the medical library.

The HealthGrades website contains the clinical quality data for Santa Clara Valley Medical Center, as of 2018. For this rating section clinical quality rating data, patient safety ratings and patient experience ratings are presented.

For inpatient conditions and procedures, there are three possible ratings: worse than expected, as expected, better than expected. For this hospital the data for this category is:

- Worse than expected - 4
- As expected - 12
- Better than expected - 5

For patient safety ratings the same three possible ratings are used. For this hospital they are"

- Worse than expected - 0
- As expected - 12
- Better than expected - 1

Percentage of patients rating this hospital as a 9 or 10 - 62% Percentage of patients who on average rank hospitals as a 9 or 10 - 69%
