= Rehabilitation Trauma Center =

Rehabilitation Trauma Centre
- Santa Clara Valley Medical Center

Geography
- Location: 751 S. Bascom Ave, San Jose, California, United States
- Coordinates: 37.314219°N 121.933351°W

Organization
- Type: Research, Teaching
- Affiliated university: Stanford University School of Medicine

Services
- Beds: 10

History
- Founded: 1972

Links
- Website: Rehabilitation Trauma Center
- Lists: Hospitals in the United States

The Rehabilitation Trauma Center (RTC) at the Santa Clara Valley Medical Center (SCVMC) was founded in 1972 and is part of the only federally designated spinal cord injury center in Northern California. The center is one of the oldest spinal cord injury neurointensive care units in the United States and participated in the original National Institute on Disability and Rehabilitation Research Database collecting retrospective data to 1973. The center is currently a ten-bed unit based in the Sobrato Pavilion's Respiratory Rehabilitation Unit (opened in 2017) under the direction of Dr. Stephen L. McKenna. The center is known for ventilator weaning after catastrophic neurological injury.

The center is notable for clinical research in cellular therapies for neurological disease. In the first US clinical trial of hESC based therapies for spinal cord injury, 40% of the patients in the trial were enrolled through the Rehabilitation Trauma Center at Santa Clara Valley Medical Center. In the subsequent dose escalation trial, the Center treated the first patient in the nation with complete (AIS-A) cervical spinal cord injury at the highest dose of 20 million cells of AST-OPC1 (oligodendrocyte progenitor cells); as well as, the first incomplete spinal cord injury (AIS-B). The results of the 10 million cells cohort showed a doubling of the expected rate of recovery from traumatic spinal cord injury. The center is a clinical program site in the Stanford Partnership for Spinal Cord Injury and Repair.

The center is a core facility for Stanford residents and fellows in training. Stanford Physical Medicine and Rehabilitation residents learn the acute care of patients with catastrophic neurological injuries through consultation in the Rehabilitation Trauma Center. The Stanford/VA Advanced Fellowship Program in Advanced Spinal Cord Injury Medicine features the center as a core training site for the management of acute neurological injury.
