= 1889 World Series =

Pre-modern baseball championship

1889 World's Championship Series
Team (Wins)	Manager(s)	Season
New York Giants (6)	Jim Mutrie	83–43–5 (.653), GA: 1
Brooklyn Bridegrooms (3)	Bill McGunnigle	93–44–3 (.675), GA: 2
- Dates: October 18–29
- Venue(s): Polo Grounds (New York); Washington Park (Brooklyn)

The 1889 World Series was an end-of-the-year baseball playoff series between the National League champion New York Giants and the American Association champion Brooklyn Bridegrooms (later known as the Dodgers).

This Series was part of the pre-modern-era World Series, an annual competition between the champions of the National League and the American Association. The Giants won this best-of-11-games series, 6 games to 3. The 1889 Series was the first involving solely New York City area clubs, and was part of the continuum of a long-standing rivalry that developed between the clubs in New York, particularly the Giants and the Dodgers. Brooklyn was then a separate city from New York; Brooklyn (and the other three boroughs) would merge with New York City in 1898. (see Timeline of New York City)

Despite this Series setback, the Brooklyn team would come back strong in 1890. The club transferred to the National League, and with the Giants suffering raids by the Players' League, would win the league championship; it was the first major league club to win consecutive pennants in two different leagues.

== World Series summary ==
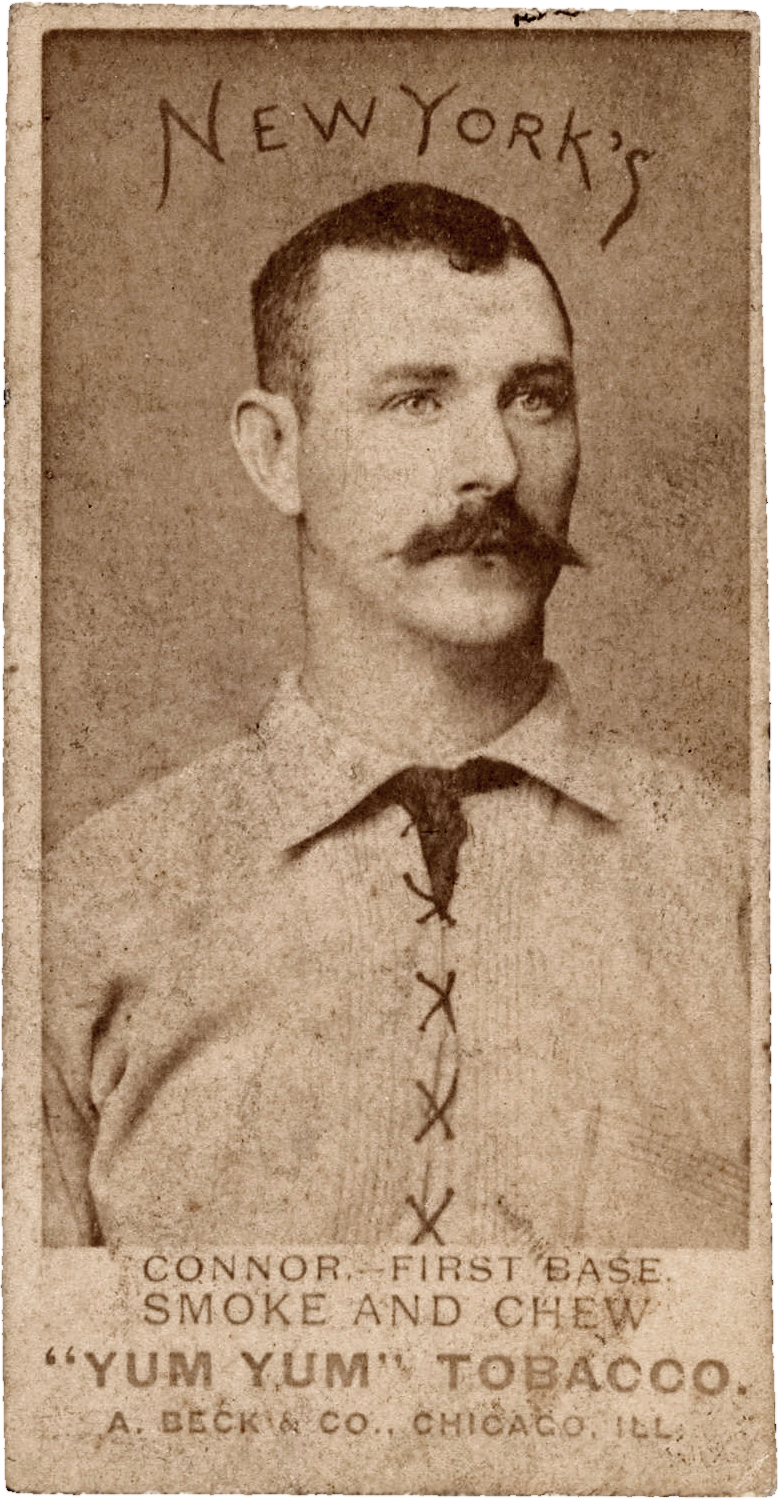
Roger Connor

The New York Giants defeated the Brooklyn Bridegrooms in the 1889 World Series, 6 games to 3.

On October 17, the two clubs owners, John B. Day of the New York club and Charles H. Byrne of the Brooklyn club, met to arrange a post-season series. They agreed that the Series would end when one club had won six games. The Series commenced the next day, and continued through October 29, when the Giants won their sixth game, ending the Series.

Attendance was good for the first two games, at the Polo Grounds and Washington Park, respectively, but the weather turned cold and rainy, and the remainder of the Series was sparsely attended.

Game 1 saw a Seventh-inning stretch after somebody yelled "Stretch for luck."

- Game 1, October 18, at New York – Brooklyn 12, New York 10
- Game 2, October 19, at Brooklyn – New York 6, Brooklyn 2
- Game 3, October 22, at New York – Brooklyn 8, New York 7 (8 innings)
- Game 4, October 23, at Brooklyn – Brooklyn 10, New York 7 (6 innings)
- Game 5, October 24, at Brooklyn – New York 11, Brooklyn 3
- Game 6, October 25, at New York – New York 2, Brooklyn 1 (11 innings)
- Game 7, October 26, at New York – New York 11, Brooklyn 7
- Game 8, October 28, at Brooklyn – New York 16, Brooklyn 7
- Game 9, October 29, at New York – New York 3, Brooklyn 2

== Sources ==
- Baseball Library chronology for 1889
- Glory Fades Away: The Nineteenth-Century World Series Rediscovered, by Jerry Lansche, Taylor Publishing, Dallas, Texas, 1991: pp. 153–182.

== See also ==
- The original World Series
