= Doug Hamilton (soccer) =

- Born: March 6, 1963
- Died: March 9, 2006 (aged 43); Aboard airplane en route from San José, Costa Rica to Los Angeles, California, U.S.
- Occupation: Soccer executive
- Known for: President and General Manager of the Los Angeles Galaxy
- Awards: Major League Soccer Executive of the Year (2003–2005)

Doug Hamilton (March 6, 1963 – March 9, 2006) was president and general manager of the Los Angeles Galaxy. He was previously the general manager of Miami Fusion F.C. Hamilton died from a heart attack aboard an airplane while traveling from San José, Costa Rica to Los Angeles, California.

Hamilton was raised in Hazlet, New Jersey, and attended St. Benedict School, and then later, Raritan High School, both in Hazlet. He attended the University of North Carolina at Greensboro and played for the men's soccer team that won two NCAA Division III championships. He then served four years as head coach of the men's soccer team at Greensboro College. Raritan High School holds a tournament every year in honor of him. He had a son named Aedan and a wife named Paige.

Hamilton won the Major League Soccer Executive of the Year award three straight times, 2003–2005. On March 15, 2006, the league renamed that award the Doug Hamilton Executive of the Year Award.
