= Hazlet, New Jersey =

Township in Monmouth County, New Jersey, US

- Township
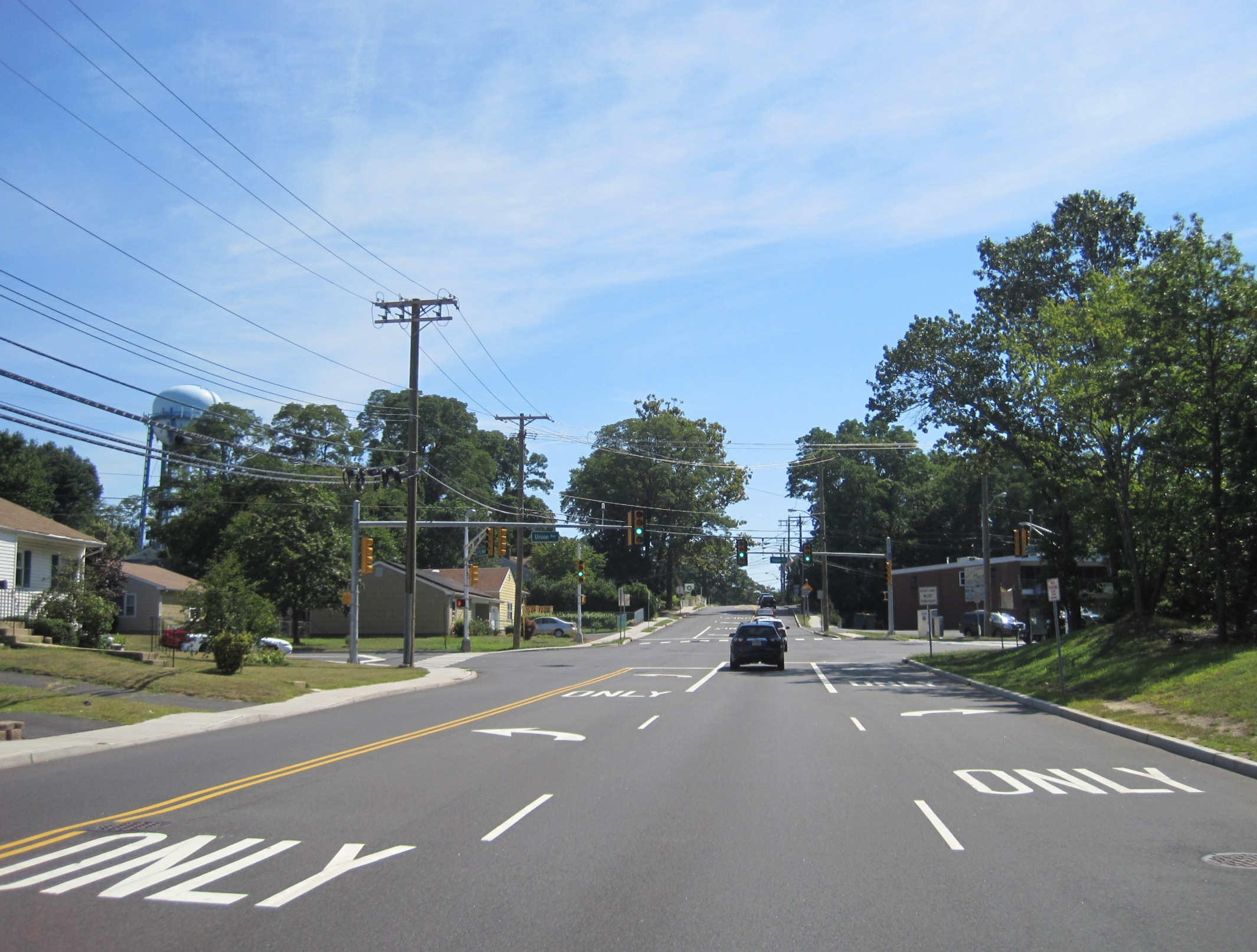
- North Centerville section of the township

- Seal

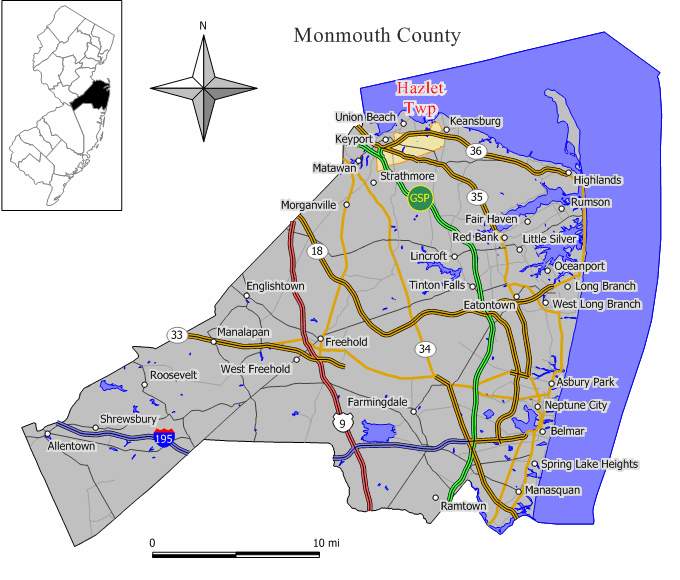
- Location of Hazlet in Monmouth County highlighted in yellow (right). Inset map: Location of Monmouth County in New Jersey highlighted in black (left).

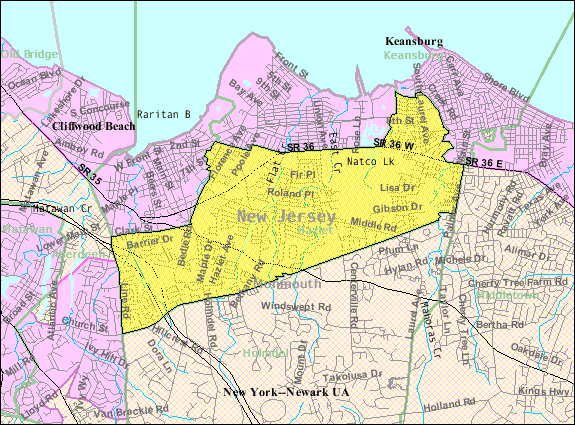
- Census Bureau map of Hazlet, New Jersey

- Location in Monmouth County Location in New Jersey Location in the United States
- Coordinates: 40.425627°N 74.16869°W
- Country: United States
- State: New Jersey
- County: Monmouth
- Incorporated: February 25, 1848 as Raritan Township
- Renamed: November 28, 1967 as Hazlet Township
- Named for: John Hazlett

Government
  - Type: Township
  - Body: Township Committee
  - Mayor: Michael C. Sachs (R, term ends December 31, 2025)
  - Administrator: Robert A. Bengivenga Jr.
  - Municipal clerk: Mary Lynch

Area
  - Total: 5.67 sq mi (14.68 km^{2})
  - Land: 5.57 sq mi (14.42 km^{2})
  - Water: 0.10 sq mi (0.26 km^{2}) 1.76%
  - Rank: 265th of 565 in state 19th of 53 in county
- Elevation: 30 ft (9.1 m)

Population (2024)
  - Total: 20,436
  - Estimate (2023): 20,524
  - Rank: 138th of 565 in state 10th of 53 in county
  - Density: 3,613.8/sq mi (1,395.3/km^{2})
  - Rank: 185th of 565 in state 19th of 53 in county
- Time zone: UTC−05:00 (Eastern (EST))
  - Summer (DST): UTC−04:00 (Eastern (EDT))
- ZIP Code: 07730
- Area code: 732
- FIPS code: 3402530690
- GNIS feature ID: 0882120
- Website: www.hazlettwp.org

Hazlet is a township in Monmouth County, in the U.S. state of New Jersey. The township is located near the Raritan Bay within the Raritan Valley region. It is located in the New York Metropolitan Area and is a bedroom community of New York City. As of the 2020 United States census, the township's population was 20,125, a decrease of 209 (−1.0%) from the 2010 census count of 20,334, which in turn reflected a decline of 1,044 (−4.9%) from the 21,378 counted in the 2000 census.

== History ==
What is now Hazlet was originally incorporated as Raritan Township by an act of the New Jersey Legislature on February 25, 1848, from portions of Middletown Township. Portions of the township were taken to form Holmdel Township (February 23, 1857), Matawan Township (also February 23, 1857, now Aberdeen Township), Keyport (March 17, 1870), Keansburg (March 26, 1917) and Union Beach (March 16, 1925). The township was renamed "Hazlet Township" as of November 28, 1967, based on the results of a referendum held on November 7, 1967. Hazlet derives its name from Dr. John Hazlett, who had an estate in Raritan Township near the Keyport-Holmdel Turnpike, now Holmdel Road.

Hazlet was the site of the last drive-in movie theater in New Jersey, the Route 35 Drive-In, which closed in 1991, until the Delsea Drive-In in Vineland reopened in 2004.

Hazlet was part of the Bayshore Regional Strategic Plan, an effort by nine municipalities in northern Monmouth County to reinvigorate the area's economy by emphasizing the traditional downtowns, dense residential neighborhoods, maritime history, and the natural environment of the Raritan Bayshore coastline. The plan has since been integrated into the 2016 Monmouth County Master Plan.

== Geography ==
According to the United States Census Bureau, the township had a total area of 5.67 square miles (14.68 km^{2}), including 5.57 square miles (14.42 km^{2}) of land and 0.10 square miles (0.26 km^{2}) of water (1.76%). Hazlet is roughly 37 miles (60 km) south of New York City and 56 miles (90 km) northeast of Philadelphia.

Unincorporated communities located partially or completely within Hazlet include Centerville, Mechanicsville, North Centerville, South Keyport, Tiltons Corner, Van Marters Corner and West Keansburg.

The township borders Aberdeen Township, Holmdel Township, Keansburg, Keyport, Middletown Township and Union Beach.

== Demographics ==
Historical population
Census	Pop.	Note	%±
1850	4,198		—
1860	2,979	*	−29.0%
1870	3,443	*	15.6%
1880	3,891		13.0%
1890	1,368		−64.8%
1900	1,524		11.4%
1910	1,583		3.9%
1920	1,659	*	4.8%
1930	1,568	*	−5.5%
1940	1,662		6.0%
1950	2,763		66.2%
1960	15,334		455.0%
1970	22,239		45.0%
1980	23,013		3.5%
1990	21,976		−4.5%
2000	21,378		−2.7%
2010	20,334		−4.9%
2020	20,125		−1.0%
2023 (est.)	20,524		2.0%
Population sources: 1850–1920 1850–1870; 1850 1870 1880–1890; 1890–1910 1910–1930; 1940–2000 2000; 2010 2020 * = Lost territory in previous decade.

=== 2024 Census ===
Estimates from the 2024 United States census counted 20,641 people and 7,659 households, with the estimated persons per household 2.63. With an owner-occupied housing unit rate of 88.5%, the median value of owner-occupied housing units was an estimated $441,300. Persons under 5 years old made up 5.3% of the population, persons under 18 years old made up 19.1 percent of the population, and persons 65 years and older made up 20.1% of the population. The last reported population density was 3613.8 people per square mile. 52.4% of Hazlet's population was estimated to be female. The racial makeup in Hazlet was listed as 85.1% White (solely white), .7% Black or African American, 1.9% Asian and 13.5% Hispanic or Latino.

In terms of education, 92.7% of the population in Hazlet has a high school education or higher, and 30.4% of the population has a bachelor's degree or higher.

=== 2010 census ===
The 2010 United States census counted 20,334 people, 7,140 households, and 5,526 families in the township. The population density was 3,659.4 per square mile (1,412.9/km^{2}). There were 7,417 housing units at an average density of 1,334.8 per square mile (515.4/km^{2}). The racial makeup was 91.93% (18,694) White, 1.48% (301) Black or African American, 0.07% (15) Native American, 3.40% (691) Asian, 0.01% (3) Pacific Islander, 1.58% (322) from other races, and 1.51% (308) from two or more races. Hispanic or Latino of any race were 7.87% (1,601) of the population.

Of the 7,140 households, 33.4% had children under the age of 18; 63.0% were married couples living together; 10.3% had a female householder with no husband present and 22.6% were non-families. Of all households, 19.3% were made up of individuals and 10.4% had someone living alone who was 65 years of age or older. The average household size was 2.82 and the average family size was 3.26.

22.7% of the population were under the age of 18, 7.8% from 18 to 24, 23.9% from 25 to 44, 31.0% from 45 to 64, and 14.6% who were 65 years of age or older. The median age was 42.3 years. For every 100 females, the population had 92.4 males. For every 100 females ages 18 and older there were 89.3 males.

The Census Bureau's 2006–2010 American Community Survey showed that (in 2010 inflation-adjusted dollars) median household income was $89,415 (with a margin of error of +/− $5,891) and the median family income was $102,743 (+/− $5,511). Males had a median income of $71,710 (+/− $5,920) versus $53,371 (+/− $2,532) for females. The per capita income for the township was $33,051 (+/− $1,340). About 1.2% of families and 2.5% of the population were below the poverty line, including 1.3% of those under age 18 and 6.0% of those age 65 or over.

=== 2000 census ===
As of the 2000 United States census there were 21,378 people, 7,244 households, and 5,802 families residing in the township. The population density was 3,802.3 inhabitants per square mile (1,468.1/km^{2}). There were 7,406 housing units at an average density of 1,317.2 per square mile (508.6/km^{2}). The racial makeup of the township was 93.17% White, 1.10% African American, 0.06% Native American, 3.39% Asian, 1.13% from other races, and 1.15% from two or more races. Hispanic or Latino of any race were 5.87% of the population.

There were 7,244 households, out of which 37.2% had children under the age of 18 living with them, 67.2% were married couples living together, 9.4% had a female householder with no husband present, and 19.9% were non-families. 17.3% of all households were made up of individuals, and 9.7% had someone living alone who was 65 years of age or older. The average household size was 2.92 and the average family size was 3.32.

In the township the population was spread out, with 25.5% under the age of 18, 6.9% from 18 to 24, 29.2% from 25 to 44, 25.0% from 45 to 64, and 13.5% who were 65 years of age or older. The median age was 38 years. For every 100 females, there were 91.5 males. For every 100 females age 18 and over, there were 89.1 males.

The median income for a household in the township was $65,697, and the median income for a family was $71,361. Males had a median income of $51,776 versus $32,439 for females. The per capita income for the township was $25,262. About 2.3% of families and 3.4% of the population were below the poverty line, including 2.6% of those under age 18 and 6.6% of those age 65 or over.

== Government ==
=== Local government ===
Hazlet is governed under the Township form of New Jersey municipal government, one of 141 municipalities (of the 564) statewide that use this form, the second-most commonly used form of government in the state. The Township Committee is comprised of five members, who are elected directly by the voters at-large in partisan elections to serve three-year terms of office on a staggered basis, with either one or two seats coming up for election each year as part of the November general election in a three-year cycle. The Mayor and Deputy Mayor are elected annually by the Committee from among its five members at a reorganization meeting held each January.

As of 2025, members of the Hazlet Township Committee are Mayor Michael C. Sachs (R, term on committee ends December 31, 2027; term as mayor ends 2025), Deputy Mayor Peter Terranova (R, term on committee ends 2027; term as deputy mayor ends 2027), James A. Cavuto (R, 2025), Robert Preston Jr. (R, 2025) and Alice Campos Zanghi (R, 2027).

In April 2022, the Township Committee selected Peter Terranova to fill the seat expiring in December 2024 that had been held by Tara Corcoran-Clark until she stepped down from office in February due to health issues. In May 2022, Robert Preston was appointed to the seat that had been held by Scott Aagre until resigned from office the previous month from a seat expiring in December 2022.

In January 2019, former councilmember Michael Sachs was selected to fill the council seat expiring in December 2020 that had been held by Susan Kiley until she resigned to take office on the Monmouth County Board of Chosen Freeholders. Sachs served on an interim basis until the November 2019 general election, when he was chosen to serve the balance of the term of office.

=== Federal, state and county representation ===
Hazlet Township is located in the 6th Congressional District and is part of New Jersey's 13th state legislative district.

For the 119th United States Congress, New Jersey's 6th congressional district is represented by Frank Pallone (D, Long Branch). New Jersey is represented in the United States Senate by Democrats Cory Booker (Newark, term ends 2027) and Andy Kim (Moorestown, term ends 2031).

For the 2026–2027 session, the 13th legislative district of the New Jersey Legislature is represented in the New Jersey Senate by Declan O'Scanlon (R, Little Silver) and in the General Assembly by Vicky Flynn (R, Holmdel Township) and Gerard Scharfenberger (R, Middletown Township).

Monmouth County is governed by a Board of County Commissioners composed of five members who are elected at-large to serve three-year terms of office on a staggered basis, with either one or two seats up for election each year as part of the November general election. At an annual reorganization meeting held in the beginning of January, the board selects one of its members to serve as director and another as deputy director.

As of 2025, Monmouth County's Commissioners are Director Thomas A. Arnone (R, Neptune City, 2025), Susan M. Kiley (R, Hazlet Township, 2027), Erik Anderson (R, Shrewsbury, 2026), Nick DiRocco (R, Wall Township, 2025), and Deputy Director Ross F. Licitra (R, Marlboro Township, 2026).

Constitutional officers elected on a countywide basis are Clerk Christine Giordano Hanlon (R, 2025; Ocean Township), Sheriff Shaun Golden (R, 2025; Howell Township) and Surrogate Rosemarie D. Peters (R, 2026; Middletown Township).

=== Politics ===
United States presidential election results for Hazlet
Year	Republican		Democratic		Third party(ies)	
Year	No.	%	No.	%	No.	%
2024	7,379	62.97%	4,134	35.28%	205	1.75%
2020	7,139	58.95%	4,779	39.46%	192	1.59%
2016	6,252	61.29%	3,566	34.96%	382	3.75%
2012	4,844	51.77%	4,365	46.65%	148	1.58%
2008	5,732	54.65%	4,618	44.03%	139	1.33%
2004	5,756	56.34%	4,375	42.82%	86	0.84%
2000	3,905	42.33%	4,930	53.44%	391	4.24%
1996	3,160	35.23%	4,750	52.96%	1,059	11.81%
1992	4,141	42.94%	3,654	37.89%	1,849	19.17%

As of March 2011, there were a total of 13,685 registered voters in Hazlet Township, of which 3,679 (26.9%) were registered as Democrats, 2,606 (19.0%) were registered as Republicans and 7,388 (54.0%) were registered as Unaffiliated. There were 12 voters registered as Libertarians or Greens.

Gubernatorial election results for Hazlet
Year	Republican		Democratic		Third party(ies)	
Year	No.	%	No.	%	No.	%
2025	5,461	60.07%	3,578	39.36%	52	0.57%
2021	5,149	66.44%	2,522	32.54%	79	1.02%
2017	3,604	60.07%	2,226	37.10%	170	2.83%
2013	4,164	71.98%	1,524	26.34%	97	1.68%
2009	4,517	66.14%	1,805	26.43%	507	7.42%
2005	3,254	50.50%	2,851	44.25%	338	5.25%

In the 2012 presidential election, Republican Mitt Romney received 51.8% of the vote (4,844 cast), ahead of Democrat Barack Obama with 46.6% (4,365 votes), and other candidates with 1.6% (148 votes), among the 9,430 ballots cast by the township's 13,851 registered voters (73 ballots were spoiled), for a turnout of 68.1%. In the 2008 presidential election, Republican John McCain received 54.0% of the vote (5,732 cast), ahead of Democrat Barack Obama with 43.5% (4,618 votes) and other candidates with 1.3% (139 votes), among the 10,617 ballots cast by the township's 14,345 registered voters, for a turnout of 74.0%. In the 2004 presidential election, Republican George W. Bush received 56.2% of the vote (5,756 ballots cast), outpolling Democrat John Kerry with 42.7% (4,375 votes) and other candidates with 0.6% (86 votes), among the 10,249 ballots cast by the township's 13,777 registered voters, for a turnout percentage of 74.4.

In the 2013 gubernatorial election, Republican Chris Christie received 72.0% of the vote (4,164 cast), ahead of Democrat Barbara Buono with 26.3% (1,524 votes), and other candidates with 1.7% (97 votes), among the 5,883 ballots cast by the township's 13,838 registered voters (98 ballots were spoiled), for a turnout of 42.5%. In the 2009 gubernatorial election, Republican Chris Christie received 65.7% of the vote (4,517 ballots cast), ahead of Democrat Jon Corzine with 26.2% (1,805 votes), Independent Chris Daggett with 6.1% (420 votes) and other candidates with 1.3% (87 votes), among the 6,877 ballots cast by the township's 13,927 registered voters, yielding a 49.4% turnout.

United States Senate election results for Hazlet1
Year	Republican		Democratic		Third party(ies)	
Year	No.	%	No.	%	No.	%
2024	6,733	60.68%	4,092	36.88%	271	2.44%
2018	4,855	62.01%	2,887	36.87%	88	1.12%
2012	4,958	55.81%	3,769	42.43%	156	1.76%
2006	3,084	52.13%	2,634	44.52%	198	3.35%

United States Senate election results for Hazlet2
Year	Republican		Democratic		Third party(ies)	
Year	No.	%	No.	%	No.	%
2020	6,914	58.12%	4,732	39.77%	251	2.11%
2014	2,540	53.65%	2,069	43.71%	125	2.64%
2013	1,836	58.42%	1,269	40.38%	38	1.21%
2008	4,834	50.23%	4,457	46.31%	333	3.46%

== Education ==
The Hazlet Township Public Schools serve students in pre-kindergarten through twelfth grade. As of the 2022–23 school year, the district, comprised of eight schools, had an enrollment of 2,703 students and 247.0 classroom teachers (on an FTE basis), for a student–teacher ratio of 10.9:1. Schools in the district (with 2022–23 enrollment data from the National Center for Education Statistics) are Sycamore Drive Early Childhood Learning Center with 282 students in grades PreK-K, Lilian Drive Elementary School with 258 students in grades 1–4, Middle Road Elementary School with 271 students in grades 1–4, Raritan Valley Elementary School with 251 students in grades 1–4, Beers Street Elementary School with 188 students in grades 5–6, Cove Road Elementary School with 188 students in grades 5–6 Hazlet Middle School with 402 students in grades 7–8 and Raritan High School with 838 students in grades 9–12.

== Transportation ==
=== Roads and highways ===
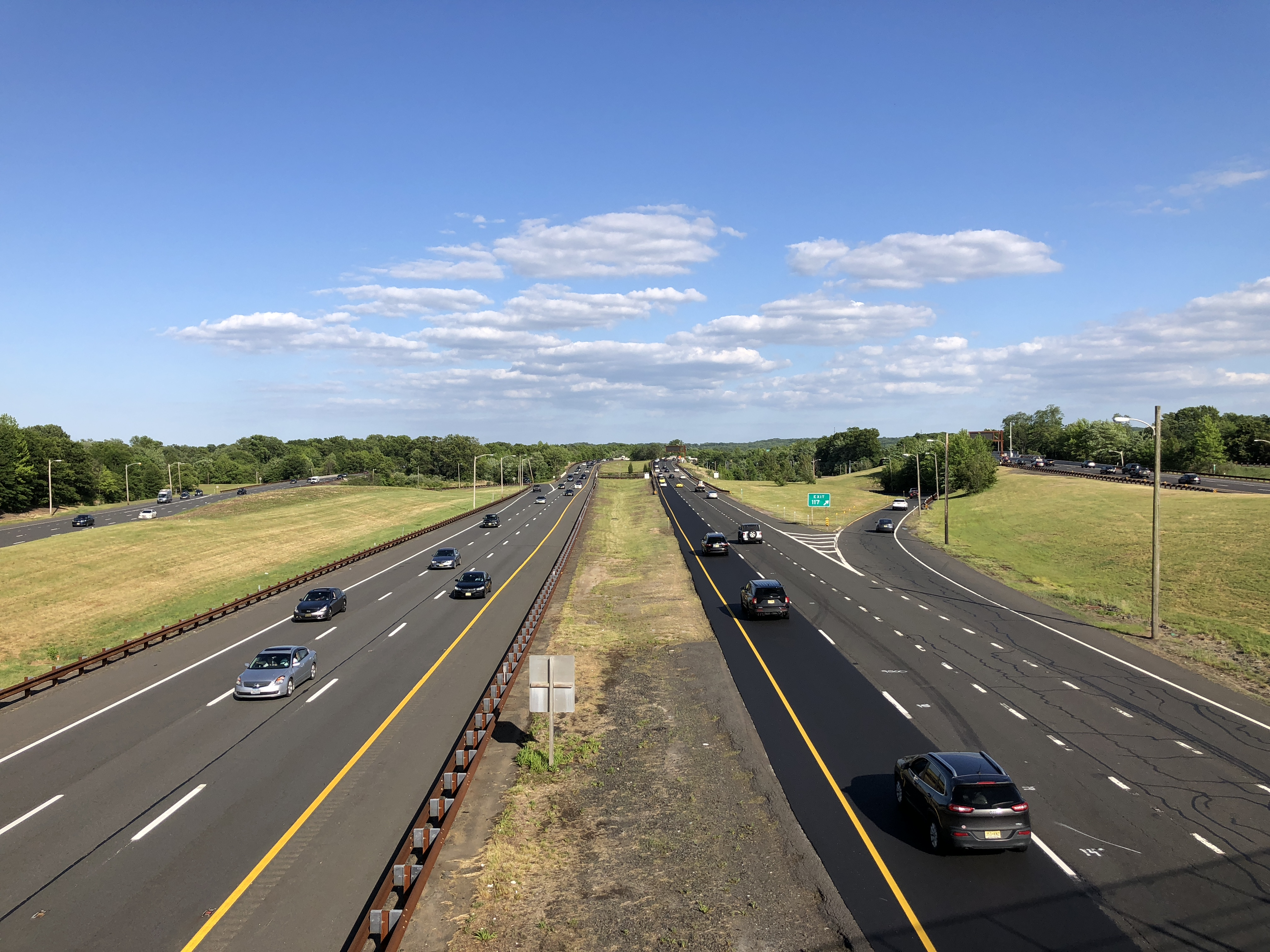
The Garden State Parkway, the largest and busiest highway in Hazlet

As of May 2010, the township had a total of 77.19 miles (124.23 km) of roadways, of which 67.20 miles (108.15 km) were maintained by the municipality, 4.41 miles (7.10 km) by Monmouth County and 4.39 miles (7.07 km) by the New Jersey Department of Transportation.

Route 35, Route 36 and County Route 516 are within Hazlet's borders. The Garden State Parkway also travels through the township, providing access to the Jersey Shore and destinations including South Jersey, New York City and destinations north. The Parkway's interchange 117, labeled for Keyport / Hazlet, is located within the township.

=== Public transportation ===
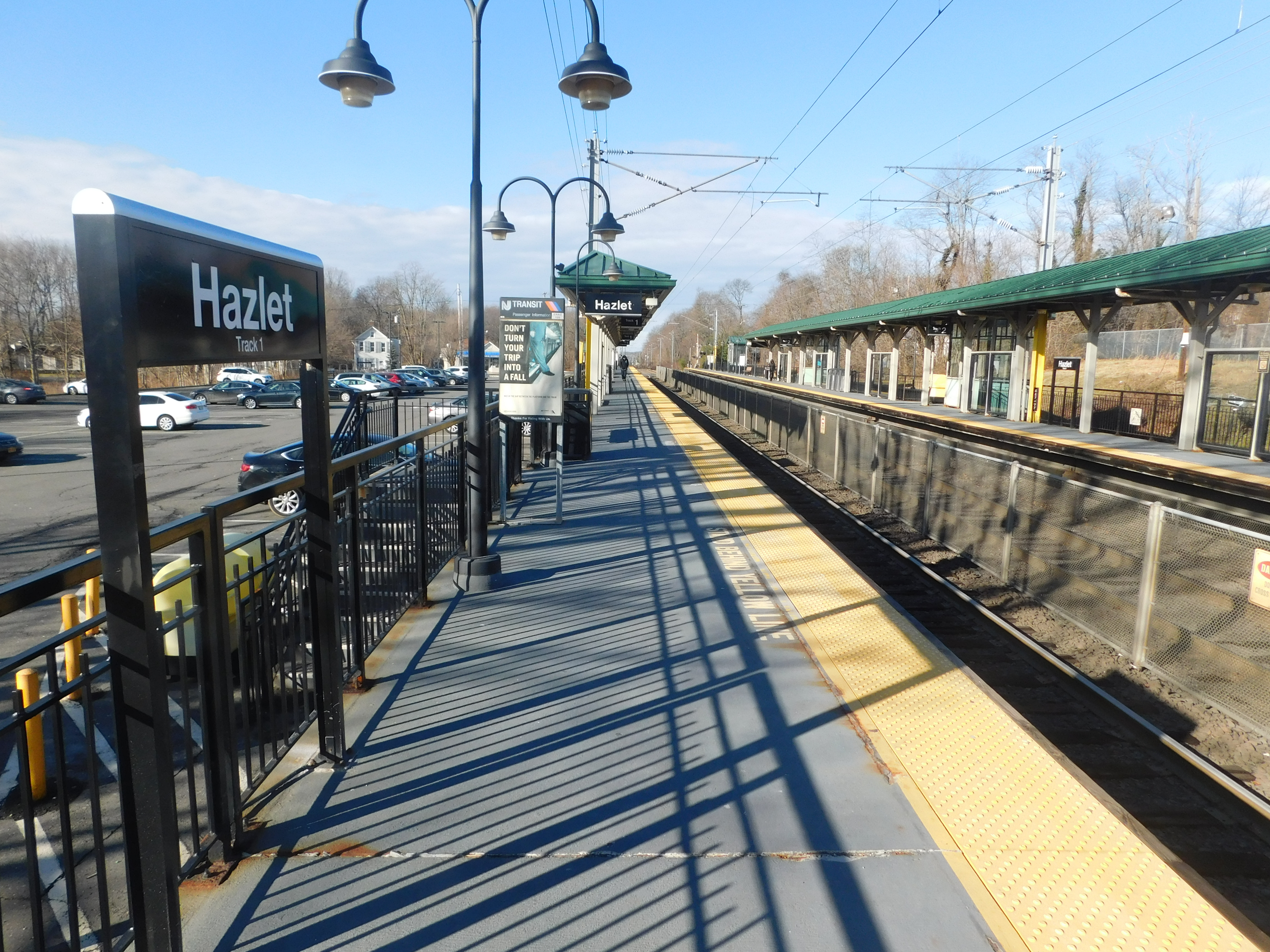
Hazlet train station stop

NJ Transit train service is available at the Hazlet station. The station offers commuter service on the North Jersey Coast Line to Hoboken Terminal, Newark Penn Station and New York Penn Station in Midtown Manhattan.

NJ Transit provides local bus service on the 817 route.

There is an Academy bus stop located along Highway 36 at 1371 State Route 36. This serves as the main bus stop in Hazlet, New Jersey, and a popular stop for those commuting to New York City.

Through rail freight service is provided by Conrail Shared Assets Operations, which provides freight service between South Amboy and Lakehurst via Red Bank.

== Cemeteries ==
The Aumack Family Burying Ground contains the graves of 20 people, including Private Garret Aumack and Corporal Leonard Aumack, who served in the War of 1812.

== Notable people ==
People who were born in, residents of, or otherwise closely associated with Hazlet include:

- David Burke (born 1962), chef and restaurateur
- Jonathan Capehart (born 1967), journalist
- James Coonan (born 1946), former head of the Irish-American gang The Westies
- Ray Evernham (born 1957), NASCAR co-owner of Evernham Motorsports and former crew chief of Jeff Gordon
- Jeff Feuerzeig (born 1964), film screenwriter and director
- Sammi "Sweetheart" Giancola (born 1987), television personality, model and actress who appeared on MTV's Jersey Shore
- Doug Hamilton (1963–2006), Major League Soccer executive
- Jyllissa Harris (born 2000), professional soccer defender for the Houston Dash of the National Women's Soccer League
- Bennett Jackson (born 1991), cornerback for the New York Giants who attended the University of Notre Dame
- Joey Janela (born 1989), professional wrestler with All Elite Wrestling
- Daniel O'Brien (born 1986), editor and senior writer for the comedy website Cracked.com
- Skip O'Brien (1950–2011), actor who had a recurring role on CSI: Crime Scene Investigation
- Jim Ortlieb (born 1956), film, television and theatre actor known for his roles in Roswell and Felicity
- Jerry Recco (born 1974), WFAN sports anchor
- Denise Reddy (born 1970), former professional soccer player who has been head coach of Sky Blue FC in the National Women's Soccer League since November 2017
- Michael A. Sheehan (1955–2018), author, government official and military officer
- Dave Witte (born 1971), heavy metal drummer known for his work with Municipal Waste, Discordance Axis, Black Army Jacket, Birds of Prey, and Burnt By The Sun
