= West Keansburg, New Jersey =

Populated place in Monmouth County, New Jersey, US

- Unincorporated community
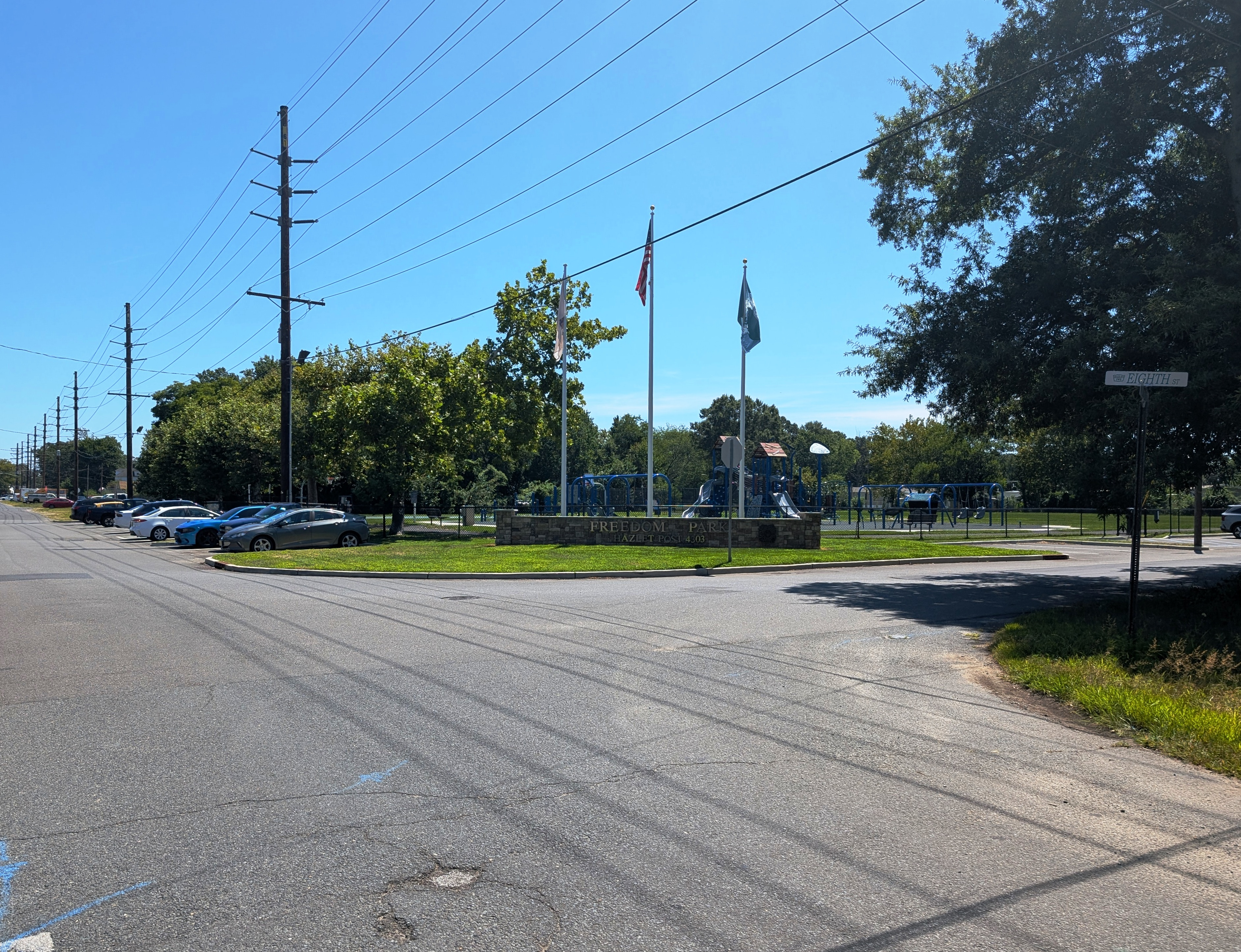
- Freedom Park in West Keansburg

- Location of West Keansburg in Monmouth County. Inset: Location of county within the state of New Jersey West Keansburg (New Jersey) West Keansburg (the United States) West Keansburg (New Jersey) West Keansburg (the United States)
- Coordinates: 40°26′33″N 74°08′39″W
- Country: United States
- State: New Jersey
- County: Monmouth
- Township: Hazlet
- Elevation: 7 ft (2.1 m)
- Time zone: UTC−05:00 (Eastern (EST))
  - Summer (DST): UTC−04:00 (EDT)
- GNIS feature ID: 2044982

West Keansburg is an unincorporated community located within Hazlet Township in Monmouth County, in the U.S. state of New Jersey. Its total land area is estimated at 1.667 square miles (4.32 km^{2}) and it includes portions of the township east of Waackaack Creek and some parts north of Route 36, as well as some other parts in northeast Hazlet. As of the 2000 United States census, West Keansburg had a population of 14,423, which is over half of Hazlet's total population of 21,165.

Notable landmarks in the area include West Keansburg Fire Company Number One and Freedom Park (formerly Eighth Street Park).

West Keansburg residents have a different ZIP Code than that of other residents of Hazlet. West Keansburg is served by the 07734 ZIP code, with the remainder of the township served by the 07730 Hazlet post office. In early October 2013, The United States Postal Service officially changed the name of the West Keansburg post office to "Hazlet".
