= Denise Reddy =

American soccer coach (born 1970)

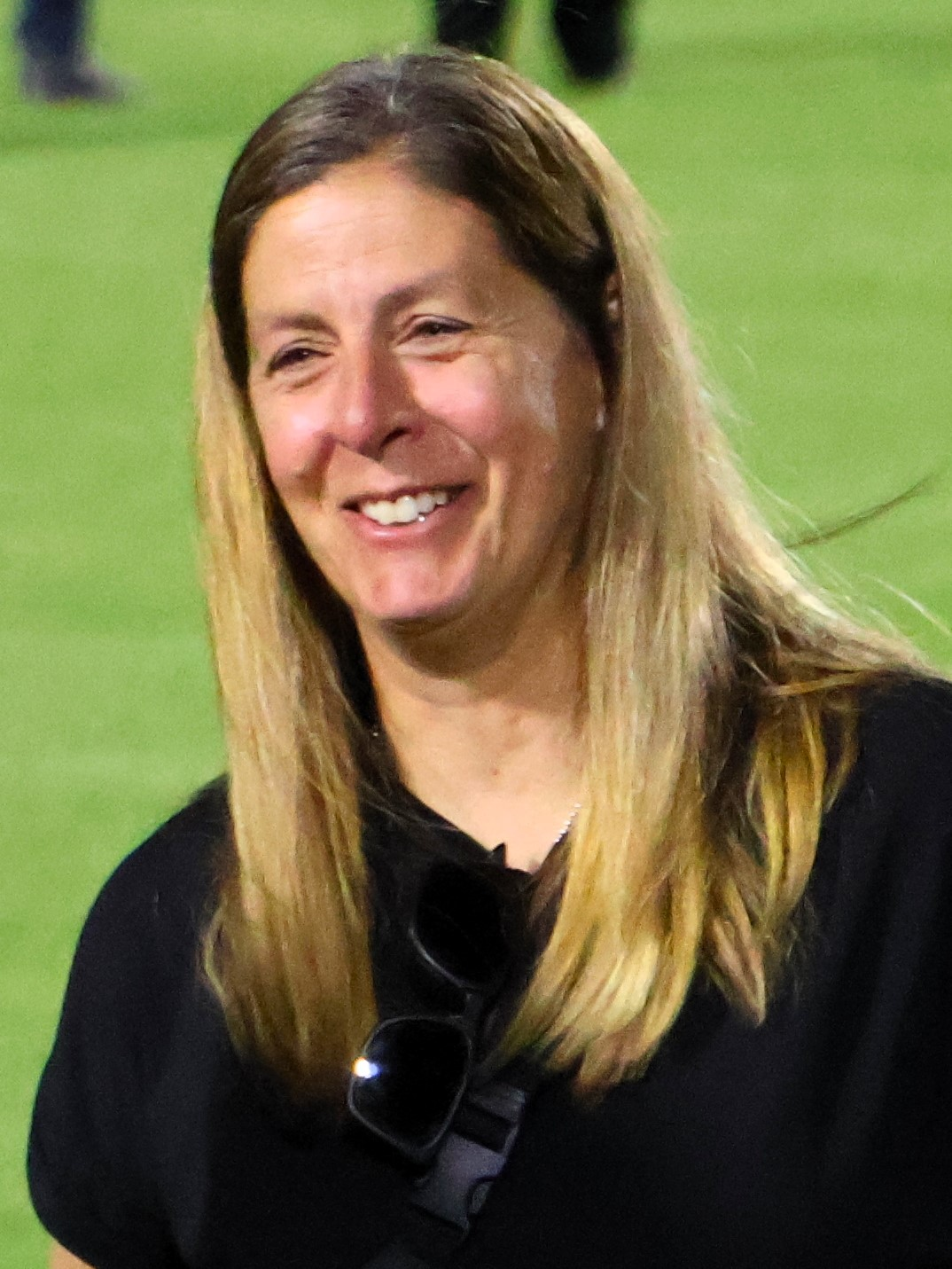
- Reddy in 2025

Personal information
- Full name: Denise Helen Reddy
- Date of birth: September 14, 1970 (age 56)
- Place of birth: Hazlet, New Jersey
- Position: Center back

College career
Years	Team	Apps	(Gls)
1988–1991	Rutgers Scarlet Knights	81	(5)

Senior career*
Years	Team	Apps	(Gls)
1995	Umeå IK		
1996–2005	Malmö DFF	336	(35)

Managerial career
- 1989–1994: New Jersey ODP
- 1994: Cornell Big Red (assistant)
- 1996–2001: Borger HS (assistant)
- 2004–2005: Procivitas HS
- 2006: New Jersey Wildcats (assistant)
- 2006–2008: Jersey Sky Blue
- 2008–2010: Chicago Red Stars (assistant)
- 2011: Linköpings FC (assistant)
- 2012: Linköpings FC
- 2012–2014: B.93/HIK/Skjold
- 2015–2016: Vittsjö GIK
- 2016–2017: Washington Spirit (assistant)
- 2017–2019: Sky Blue FC
- 2020: United States U20 (assistant)
- 2020–2024: Chelsea (assistant)
- 2024-: United States (assistant)
- * Club domestic league appearances and goals

Denise Helen Reddy (born September 14, 1970) is an American professional soccer coach and former player who is currently an assistant head coach for the United States women's national soccer team.

Reddy holds a UEFA Pro License and previously coached Sky Blue FC of the National Women's Soccer League. She has also served as an assistant coach to Jim Gabarra at Washington Spirit and as head coach of Linköpings FC and Vittsjö GIK in Sweden, B.93/HIK/Skjold in Denmark, and Jersey Sky Blue of the USL W-League. She played four years as a starter at Rutgers University and 11 years as a professional in Sweden.

Reddy is from Hazlet, New Jersey and graduated from Raritan High School.

== Playing career ==
=== Rutgers University, 1988–1991 ===
Reddy was a four-year starter for the Rutgers Scarlet Knights, from 1988 to 1991. During that span, the Scarlet Knights won two Eastern Collegiate Athletic Conference championship titles, and Reddy was named to the NSCAA All-America second team in 1991. During her collegiate career, she scored 5 goals and 9 assists in 81 appearances.

Reddy also played for the Rutgers women's basketball team from 1990 to 1993, including an appearance in the 1993 Atlantic 10 Championship. She received her bachelor's degree in exercise science and communications.

=== Sweden, 1995–2005 ===
After college, Reddy joined Swedish side Umeå IK in 1995, then moved to Malmö DFF in 1996, where she played for 10 years. For seven of those seasons, from 1999 to 2005, Reddy was the team's captain. During Reddy's time on the team, Malmö DFF won the 1997 Swedish Cup, reached the semifinals of the 2003–04 UEFA Women's Cup, and appeared in the 2005 Mediterranean International Cup championship. During her career at Malmö DFF, she scored 35 goals in 336 appearances.

== Coaching career ==
=== Youth and non-professional, 1989–2005 ===
Reddy coached in the New Jersey Olympic Development Program (ODP) from 1989 to 1994, and served as an assistant coach at Cornell University in 1994. During her professional playing career, Reddy also coached or was an assistant trainer at Borger (1996–2001) and Procivitas (2004–2005) high school academies in Sweden.

=== New Jersey Wildcats, 2006–2007 ===
Charlie Naimo, then head coach of holding USL W-League champions New Jersey Wildcats, hired Reddy as an assistant in April 2006, following her retirement as a professional player.

=== Jersey Sky Blue, 2007–2008 ===
After the season, she was hired as the head coach of the W-League's Jersey Sky Blue, where she served until 2008. Jersey Sky Blue was chaired by Thomas Hofstetter, who would go on to form Sky Blue FC in 2009, and Reddy is credited as one of the club's founders and instrumental in the establishment of the Sky Blue Soccer School.

=== Chicago Red Stars, 2008–2010 ===
Reddy joined the coaching staff of the Chicago Red Stars of Women's Professional Soccer in 2008 as an assistant, where she served until 2010.

=== Linköpings FC, 2011–2012 ===
Reddy was hired by Linköpings FC of the Swedish Damallsvenskan in 2011 as an assistant, a year in which Linköpings reached the UEFA Women's Champions League quarterfinals. She became a co-head coach with Christian Anderson in 2012.

=== B.93/HIK/Skjold, 2012–2014 ===
Reddy coached Danish side B.93/HIK/Skjold from 2012 to 2014.

=== Vittsjö GIK, 2015–2016 ===
Reddy joined Swedish club Vittsjö GIK as head coach in January 2015, and remained with the team into 2016.

=== Washington Spirit, 2016–2017 ===
In the National Women's Soccer League, former Sky Blue FC head coach Jim Gabarra took over as head coach of the Washington Spirit after the departure of Mark Parsons to Portland Thorns FC. Gabarra hired Reddy as a defensive assistant coach, where she served until November 2017. Reddy was also the Spirit's Maryland Developmental Academy director.

=== Sky Blue FC, 2017–2019 ===
On November 15, 2017, Sky Blue FC named Reddy as their new head coach, succeeding Christy Holly, who resigned during the 2017 National Women's Soccer League season. Reddy was briefly the only woman as a head coach in the NWSL, between the departure of Laura Harvey from Seattle Reign FC at the start of November 2017 to November 27, when Laura Harvey was hired to manage Utah Royals FC and Vera Pauw was named head coach of the Houston Dash.

On June 28, 2019, Reddy was relieved of her head coaching duties.

=== Chelsea, 2020–2024 ===
Reddy joined Chelsea as assistant coach on August 19, 2020.

=== United States women, 2024–present ===
Reddy joined United States women's national soccer team as assistant coach on May 24, 2024.
