= Hazlet Township Public Schools =

School district in Monmouth County, New Jersey, US

Address
- 421 Middle Road Hazlet, Monmouth County, New Jersey, 07730; United States
- Coordinates: 40.424273°N 74.152874°W

District information
- Grades: pre-K to 12
- Superintendent: Scott Ridley
- Business administrator: Tracy Petrino
- Schools: 8

Students and staff
- Enrollment: 2,724 (as of 2023–24)
- Faculty: 235.97 FTEs
- Student–teacher ratio: 11.54:1

Other information
- District Factor Group: DE
- Website: www.hazlet.org
Ind.	Per pupil	District spending	Rank (*)	K-12 average	%± vs. average
1A	Total Spending	$16,432	17	$18,891	−13.0%
1	Budgetary Cost	14,182	42	14,783	−4.1%
2	Classroom Instruction	8,545	48	8,763	−2.5%
6	Support Services	1,802	14	2,392	−24.7%
8	Administrative Cost	1,586	45	1,485	6.8%
10	Operations & Maintenance	1,884	54	1,783	5.7%
13	Extracurricular Activities	348	21	268	29.9%
16	Median Teacher Salary	62,700	31	64,043
Data from NJDoE 2014 Taxpayers' Guide to Education Spending. *Of K-12 districts with 1,800-3,500 students. Lowest spending=1; Highest=68

The Hazlet Township Public Schools is a comprehensive community public school district that serves students in pre-kindergarten through twelfth grade from Hazlet, in Monmouth County, in the U.S. state of New Jersey.

As of the 2023–24 school year, the district, comprised of eight schools, had an enrollment of 2,724 students and 235.97 classroom teachers (on an FTE basis), for a student–teacher ratio of 11.54:1.

The district is classified by the New Jersey Department of Education as being in District Factor Group "DE", the fifth-highest of eight groupings. District Factor Groups organize districts statewide to allow comparison by common socioeconomic characteristics of the local districts. From lowest socioeconomic status to highest, the categories are A, B, CD, DE, FG, GH, I and J.

== Schools ==
Schools in the district (with 2023–24 enrollment data from the National Center for Education Statistics) are:

Early childhood

- Sycamore Drive Early Childhood Learning Center with 334 students in grades PreK-K

Elementary schools

- Lilian Drive Elementary School with 260 students in grades 1–4
- Middle Road Elementary School with 268 students in grades 1–4
- Raritan Valley Elementary School with 238 students in grades 1–4
- Beers Street Elementary School with 212 students in grades 5–6
- Cove Road Elementary School with 169 students in grades 5–6

Middle schools

- Hazlet Middle School with 389 students in grades 7–8)

High school

- Raritan High School with 817 students in grades 9–12

== Administration ==
Core members of the district's administration as of April 2025 are:

- Scott Ridley, superintendent
- Tracy Petrino, business administrator and board secretary

== Board of education ==
The district's board of education, comprised of nine members, sets policy and oversees the fiscal and educational operation of the district through its administration. As a Type II school district, the board's trustees are elected directly by voters to serve three-year terms of office on a staggered basis, with three seats up for election each year held (since 2012) as part of the November general election. The board appoints a superintendent to oversee the district's day-to-day operations and a business administrator to supervise the business functions of the district.
