= Jim Ortlieb =

American film, television and theatre actor

James Ortlieb
- Born: June 19, 1956 (age 69)
- Occupation: Actor
- Years active: 1985–present

James Ortlieb (born June 19, 1956) is an American film, television and theatre actor known for his roles in Roswell and Felicity.

== Early life and education ==
Raised in Hazlet, New Jersey, Ortlieb graduated from Raritan High School in 1974. He attended Glassboro State College (since renamed as Rowan University), planning to study music and play soccer, but dropped out shortly after suffering an injury on one of the first days of team practice and started acting. After a few years on the stage, he earned a degree in drama from the Mason Gross School of the Arts of Rutgers University.

== Career ==
Ortlieb has also appeared in Broadway productions of Guys and Dolls and Of Mice and Men, Billy Elliot the Musical, and The Farnsworth Invention.

== Filmography ==
=== Film ===
Year	Title	Role	Notes
1986	Running Scared	Lab Technician	
1989	An Innocent Man	Convict - Robby's Death	
1990	Flatliners	Uncle Dave	
1990	Home Alone	Herb the Drugstore Clerk	
1991	Cold Justice	Illinois Troy	
1992	The Babe	Scribe	
1994	The Childhood Friend	Eddie 'Chuck' Greenberg	
1996	Chain Reaction	Orbit	
1999	Love and Action in Chicago	Business Man	
1999	The Opera Lover	Emcee	
1999	Magnolia	Middle Aged Guy	
2002	Crazy as Hell	Mr. Tobin	
2002	Bug	Louis - The Health Inspector	
2003	A Mighty Wind	David Kantor	
2003	Latter Days	Brother Farron Davis	
2004	Out for Blood	Doctor Blake	
2005	Say Uncle	David Berman	
2005	Dirty	Husband	
2006	The Enigma with a Stigma	Travis Lass	
2008	The Onion Movie	Bank Mr. Poniewicz	
2008	Ernesto	Don	
2010	Drunkboat	Morley	
2010	Black Mail	Rev. Madison	
2011	Contagion	Funeral Director	
2014	Of Mice and Men	The Boss	
2017	The Crash	Jeff Grillstein	
2017	Inheritance	Glen Crawford	
2018	Whisper	Desert Man	
2022	Next Exit	Milton	

=== Television ===
Year	Title	Role	Notes
1985	Lady Blue	Thompson	Episode: "Designer White"
1986	Jack and Mike	Bob	Episode: "Ready or Not"
1990	Gabriel's Fire	Fecky	Episode: "Pilot"
1990	Goodnight Sweet Wife: A Murder in Boston	MacLean	Television film
1991	Dillinger	Kahler	Television film
1993	The Untouchables	Wobbly	Episode: "Deal with the Devil"
1993	Missing Persons	Eli Saltz	Episode: "Some People's Priorities"
1997	Early Edition	Prosecutor	Episode: "The Jury"
1998	ER	Cook	Episode: "The Good Fight"
1999	Arliss	Ring Announcer	Episode: "The Stories You Don't Hear About"
2000	Will & Grace	Ira	Episode: "An Affair to Forget"
2000	Judging Amy	Sidney Gilbert	Episode: "Blast from the Past"
2000	The West Wing	Dr. Keller	Episode: "In The Shadow of Two Gunmen Part I"
2000	Roswell	Ed Harding	7 episodes
2000	Spin City	Jim	Episode: "Smile"
2000	CSI: Crime Scene Investigation	Winston Barger	Episode: "Pledging Mr. Johnson"
2000	Boston Public	Judge Jeremy Allen	Episode: "Chapter Seven"
2000, 2001	Diagnosis: Murder	Dr. Frederick Wilson	2 episodes
2001	Any Day Now	Principal Sloan	Episode: "Life Isn't Fair"
2001	JAG	Miller Josephson	Episode: "Past Tense"
2001	Angel	Wolfram & Hart Translator	Episode: "Lullaby"
2001	Men, Women & Dogs	Dr. Baker	Episode: "Old Dog, New Tricks"
2001–2002	Felicity	Professor Bill Hodges	7 episodes
2002	The Shield	Dr. Bernard Grady	Episode: "Pilot"
2002	The Court	Counsel	Episode: "Back in the Bottle"
2002	The Division	Sid Lockman	Episode: "Brave New World"
2002	Push, Nevada	The Middle Management Man	3 episodes
2003	Gilmore Girls	Mr. Hunter	Episode: "Lorelai Out of Water"
2003	Six Feet Under	Andrew Wayne Milne	Episode: "You Never Know"
2004	Without a Trace	Claude Cleary	2 episodes
2005	The Young and the Restless	Zoo Security Guard	2 episodes
2005	CSI: NY	John Swinton	Episode: "Til Death Do We Part"
2005	Bones	Hal	Episode: "The Man in the Fallout Shelter"
2006	CSI: Miami	Dr. Kagen	Episode: "Rampage"
2006	Boston Legal	Dr. George Murrow	2 episodes
2007	The Closer	Judd Whaley	Episode: "The Round Fire"
2007	The Unit	Principal	Episode: "Inside Out"
2007	American Body Shop	Floyd	Episode: "The Gift"
2008	Grey's Anatomy	Jack O'Brien	Episode: "Here Comes the Flood"
2012	Vegas	Gus Wilson	Episode: "Solid Citizens"
2015	Masters of Sex	Minister	Episode: "Three's a Crowd"
2016	It's Always Sunny in Philadelphia	Belka Maier	Episode: "McPoyle vs. Ponderosa: The Trial of the Century"
2017	Chicago Justice	Judge	Episode: "Dead Meat"
2017	Do You Want to See a Dead Body?	Mr. Greer	Episode: "A Body and a Breakup (with Judy Greer)"
2018	How to Get Away with Murder	Dennis Cruz	Episode: "I Got Played"
2019	The Rookie	Judge Stevens	Episode: "Fallout"
2021	Chicago Med	Dr. Richard Cohen	Episode: "Better Is the Enemy of Good"
2021	9-1-1: Lone Star	Frank	Episode: "A Little Help from My Friends"
2021	American Horror Story: Double Feature	Ray Cunningham	Episode: "Blood Buffet"
2022	Station 19	Harry	Episode: "The Little Things You Do Together"
