= Bennett Jackson =

American football player (born 1991)

No. 33, 39
- Position: Safety

Personal information
- Born: September 16, 1991 (age 35); Hazlet, New Jersey, U.S.
- Listed height: 6 ft 0 in (1.83 m)
- Listed weight: 192 lb (87 kg)

Career information
- High school: Raritan (Hazlet)
- College: Notre Dame
- NFL draft: 2014: 6th round, 187th overall pick

Career history
- New York Giants (2014–2015); Baltimore Ravens (2018–2019)*; New York Jets (2019); Baltimore Ravens (2019); New York Jets (2019–2020)
- * Offseason or practice squad member only

Career NFL statistics
- Total tackles: 7
- Stats at Pro Football Reference

Bennett Troy Jackson Jr. (born September 16, 1991) is an American former professional football player who was a safety in the National Football League (NFL). He was selected by the New York Giants in the sixth round of the 2014 NFL draft. He played college football for the Notre Dame Fighting Irish.

== Early life ==
Jackson grew up in Hazlet, New Jersey, where he attended Raritan High School. He recorded 40 receptions for 729 yards and rushed 20 times for 350 yards as senior in 2010. He also played defensive back and intercepted four passes in 2009, helping lead Raritan to 8–3 record in 2009. He caught 35 passes for 509 yards with four touchdowns during his junior season in 2008 and rushed 35 times for 267 yards and four touchdowns. He added two passing touchdowns, two punt returns for touchdowns and one kickoff return for a score during his junior season, averaging 38 yards per kickoff return and 18 yards per punt return in 2008.

He also competed in track and field as sprinter and a hurdler. He was a specialist in the 110 meter hurdles, he ran a personal best of 13.75 seconds. He also competed in the 100 meters, 200 meters and 400 meters, posting personal bests of 10.82 seconds, 21.73 seconds and 49.36 seconds, respectively.

Considered a three-star recruit by Rivals.com, he was rated as the 61st best wide receiver in the nation. He committed to Notre Dame over offers from Michigan State, Rutgers and Northwestern.

== College career ==
Jackson began his career at wide receiver playing mostly on special teams as a freshman in 2010. He recorded ten total tackles and had one carry for twenty yards. In 2011, after converting to cornerback in spring practice, playing mostly on special teams and as a backup, he recorded 18 tackles. In his junior season in 2012, he started all 13 games. He recorded 65 total tackles, including one and a half for loss, four interceptions and four pass break ups while playing the entire season with a torn labrum in his right shoulder. In 2013, as a senior, he recorded 64 tackles, including five for loss, one sack, one forced fumble, two interceptions and three pass breakups.

== Professional career ==
=== New York Giants ===
Jackson was selected by the New York Giants in the sixth round (187th overall) of the 2014 NFL draft.

Jackson signed his rookie contract with the Giants on May 19, 2014. He was cut on August 30, as part of the roster cutdown to 53 players, but was re-signed to the team's practice squad the following day. Entering the 2015 season, the Giants announced that Jackson would be moving from cornerback to safety. On August 22, 2015, Jackson suffered a torn ACL in the Giants' second preseason game and missed the entirety of the season. On September 1, he was officially placed on injured reserve by the Giants.

On August 30, 2016, Jackson was released by the Giants.

=== Baltimore Ravens (first stint) ===
On January 3, 2018, Jackson signed a reserve/future contract with the Baltimore Ravens. He was placed on injured reserve on August 31. Jackson was released by the Ravens on September 6. He was re-signed to the team's practice squad on November 27.

Jackson signed a reserve/future contract with the Ravens on January 8, 2019. On August 31, Jackson was waived by the Ravens.

=== New York Jets (first stint) ===
On September 1, 2019, Jackson was claimed off waivers by the New York Jets. He was waived on September 16, and re-signed to the practice squad.

=== Baltimore Ravens (second stint) ===
On October 15, 2019, Jackson was signed by the Baltimore Ravens off of the Jets' practice squad. He made four appearances for the Ravens, recording five combined tackles. Jackson was waived by Baltimore on December 2.

=== New York Jets (second stint) ===
On December 3, 2019, Jackson was claimed off waivers by the New York Jets. He made two appearances for the team to close out the year, logging one tackle.

On March 25, 2020, Jackson was re-signed by the Jets. He was released on September 5, and re-signed to the practice squad the next day. Jackson was promoted to the active roster on November 3. He was placed on injured reserve on December 12.

Jackson re-signed with the Jets again on April 8, 2021. He was waived on August 17. Jackson was re-signed on August 20, but was released once more on August 30.
