= Raritan High School =

High school in Monmouth County, New Jersey, United States

- Main entrance of school

Location
- 419 Middle Road; Hazlet, Monmouth County, New Jersey 07730; United States; 40.424323°N 74.152997°W

Information
- Type: Comprehensive public high school
- Motto: Home of the Rockets
- Opened: September 1962
- School district: Hazlet Township Public Schools
- CEEB code: 310518
- NCES School ID: 341368003826
- Principal: Andrew R. Piotrowski
- Faculty: 68.4 FTEs
- Grades: 9–12
- Enrollment: 817 (as of 2023–24)
- Student to teacher ratio: 12.0:1
- Colors: Green; Gray
- Athletics conference: Shore Conference
- Team name: Rockets
- Accreditation: Middle States Association of Colleges and Schools
- Newspaper: The Rocket Review
- Website: www.hazlet.org/o/rhs
- Last updated: May 2022

Raritan High School is a four-year comprehensive public high school serving students in ninth through twelfth grades from Hazlet Township in Monmouth County, in the U.S. state of New Jersey, operating as the lone secondary school of the Hazlet Township Public Schools. The school was named after the former community name, "Raritan Township," and opened in September 1962 with an enrollment of 778 students, which would increase to more than 2,300 students by 1979.

As of the 2023–24 school year, the school had an enrollment of 817 students and 68.4 classroom teachers (on an FTE basis), for a student–teacher ratio of 12.0:1. There were 100 students (12.2% of enrollment) eligible for free lunch and 48 (5.9% of students) eligible for reduced-cost lunch.

Raritan High School is accredited by the New Jersey Department of Education and has been accredited by the Middle States Association of Colleges and Schools Commission on Elementary and Secondary Schools since 2013. The school offers students a comprehensive program of education ranging from an academically-oriented, college-preparatory curriculum to courses in the vocational and career-oriented fields.

== History ==
Raritan High School was constructed at a cost of $1.5 million (equivalent to $16.0 million in 2025) with an opening date of September 1962. Prior to the school's opening, students had attended Keyport High School as part of a sending/receiving relationship.

In May 2010, the Hazlet Township Board of Education embarked on a trial of "Going green to save green" by agreeing to enter into a power purchase agreement with a third-party vendor. Under this agreement, solar panels are to be erected on awnings over the student parking lot at Raritan High School and on the rooftop of Hazlet Middle School. The $7.5 million project will be funded by the vendor to cover the costs of construction and maintenance in their entirety and in return the Hazlet school district has contractually agreed to purchase the electricity at a below market cost. The district expects to save $1.7 million in energy costs over a 15-year period.

== Awards, recognition and rankings ==
The school was the 166th-ranked public high school in New Jersey out of 339 schools statewide in New Jersey Monthly magazine's September 2014 cover story on the state's "Top Public High Schools", using a new ranking methodology. The school had been ranked 175th in the state of 328 schools in 2012, after being ranked 166th in 2010 out of 322 schools listed. The magazine ranked the school 164th in 2008 out of 316 schools. The school was ranked 153rd in the magazine's September 2006 issue, which surveyed 316 schools across the state.

Schooldigger.com ranked the school tied for 137th out of 381 public high schools statewide in its 2011 rankings (a decrease of 19 positions from the 2010 ranking) which were based on the combined percentage of students classified as proficient or above proficient on the mathematics (83.5%) and language arts literacy (95.3%) components of the High School Proficiency Assessment (HSPA).

== Athletics ==
The Raritan High School Rockets compete in Division A Central of the Shore Conference, an athletic conference comprised of public and private high schools in Monmouth and Ocean counties along the Jersey Shore. The league operates under the jurisdiction of the New Jersey State Interscholastic Athletic Association (NJSIAA). With 698 students in grades 10–12, the school was classified by the NJSIAA for the 2019–20 school year as Group IV for most athletic competition purposes, which included schools with an enrollment of 486 to 758 students in that grade range. The school was classified by the NJSIAA as Group II South for football for 2024–2026, which included schools with 514 to 685 students.

The school participates with Colts Neck High School in a joint ice hockey team in which Freehold High School is the host school / lead agency. The co-op program operates under agreements scheduled to expire at the end of the 2023–24 school year.

The boys' cross country team won the Group II state championship in 1964, and the Group III title in 1969 and 1970.

The boys' bowling team won the overall state championship in 1971.

The girls' outdoor track and field team won the Group IV state championship in 1977.

The girls' cross country running team won the Group IV state championship in 1981 and the Group III title in 1982.

The boys' soccer team finished the 1982 season with a 21–1 record after winning the Group III state championship by defeating runner-up Indian Hills High School by a score of 2–1 in the tournament final. The team was also led by standout forward, Bill Gross. The senior helped Raritan accomplish their goals throughout the 1982 season, tallying 23 goals and 15 assists.

The baseball team finished the 2003 season with a 24–5 record after winning the Group II state title against Hanover Park High School by a score of 9–7 in the championship game, after scoring eight runs in the sixth inning to overcome a 2–1 deficit.

The boys' basketball team won the Group III state championship in 2004, defeating Manasquan High School by a score of 71–60 in the tournament final.

The football team won the Central Jersey Group II state sectional championships in 2004 and 2015. The team won its first playoff-era title in 2004, with a 35–12 win against Carteret High School in the Central Jersey Group II title game. The team won the Central Jersey Group II state sectional championship in 2015 with a 28–26 win over Lincoln High School on a touchdown that came with 10 seconds left on the clock.

The boys' wrestling team won the Central Jersey Group II state sectional title in 2004, 2012, 2018, 2022 and 2023, and won the Group II state championship in 2012 and 2022. The team won the 2006 Shore Conference Class A Central title. With a 19–4 record, the team reached the finals of the NJSIAA Central Jersey. The 2012 wrestling team won the Class A Central title, with a 24-6 team record, the team won the Central Jersey Group II sectional championship (the team's second sectional title overall and first time since 2004) and the program's first ever NJSIAA Group II state championship. The 2022 team won the Central Jersey Group II sectional championship (the team's fourth sectional title overall and first since 2018) by defeating Rumson-Fair Haven Regional High School by 42-25 in the sectional finals, and then defeating Hanover Park High School in the Group II semifinals at 56-21 and then High Point Regional High School at 37-27 in the finals to bring home the program's second Group II state championship and finish the season with a 22-6 record.

== Administration ==
The school's principal is Andrew R. Piotrowski. His core administration team includes two assistant principals.

== Notable alumni ==
- Sammi Giancola (born 1987, class of 2005), appeared on MTV's Jersey Shore 2009–2012
- Doug Hamilton (1963–2006, class of 1981), Major League Soccer executive
- Bennett Jackson (born 1991, class of 2010), cornerback for the Baltimore Ravens
- Mark Lemongello (born 1955), former Major League Baseball pitcher who played for the Houston Astros and Toronto Blue Jays
- Daniel O'Brien (born 1986), three-time Emmy winning humorist, author, writer, comedian and songwriter
- Jim Ortlieb (born 1956, class of 1974), film, television and theatre actor known for his roles in Roswell and Felicity
- Denise Reddy (born 1970), former professional soccer player; head coach of Sky Blue FC in the National Women's Soccer League since 2017
