= Inheritance (2017 thriller film) =

- Directed by: Tyler Savage
- Written by: Tyler Savage
- Produced by: J.P. Castel; Chase Joliet; Tyler Savage
- Starring: Chase Joliet; Sara Montez; Dale Dickey; Drew Powell
- Cinematography: Drew Daniels
- Edited by: Shane Hazen
- Production company: Portola Pictures
- Release date: 2 June 2017 (Dances With Films Festival)
- Running time: 90 minutes
- Country: United States
- Language: English

Inheritance is a 2017 American horror-thriller film directed by Tyler Savage, starring Chase Joliet, Sara Montez, Dale Dickey and Drew Powell.

== Cast ==
- Chase Joliet as Ryan Bowman
- Sara Montez as Isi Rosales
- Dale Dickey as Effy Monroe
- Drew Powell as Del Morse
- Vincent Van Horn as Teddy
- Ashley Spillers as Allie Bowman
- Alex Dobrenko as Dave
- Tim Abell as Frank Morse
- Jim Ortlieb as Glen Crawford
- Krisha Fairchild as Bonnie
- Kate Norby as Katherine Morse
- Julio Oscar Mechoso as Teddy's Father
- Paul Henri as Wallace Morse
- Murphy Dunne as Robert Morse
- Jake Carpenter as Henry Morse
- Lauri Johnson as Morse Matriarch
- Sebastian Sozzi as Junior

== Reception ==
Michael Coldwell of Starburst called the film a "refreshing take on the haunted house genre."

Matt Boiselle of Dread Central rated the film 3.5 stars out of 5 and wrote, "Scares are few and far between, and they’re not really needed in order for this movie to succeed – it’s the implication of a very dreary history and how it still manages to linger over present time."

Chris Coffel of Bloody Disgusting gave the film a score of 2/5.
