= LA Galaxy =

American professional soccer club based in the Greater Los Angeles area

- Nicknames: Galaxy; Los Galácticos
- Short name: LA
- Founded: June 15, 1994 (32 years ago)
- Stadium: Dignity Health Sports Park; Carson, California
- Capacity: 27,000
- Owner: Anschutz Entertainment Group
- President: Dan Beckerman
- Head coach: Greg Vanney
- League: Major League Soccer
- 2026: Western Conference: 11th Overall: 20th Playoffs: Did not qualify
- Website: lagalaxy.com
Home colors	Away colors	Third colors

The LA Galaxy are an American professional soccer club based in the Greater Los Angeles area. The club competes in Major League Soccer (MLS) as a member of the Western Conference. The Galaxy began play in 1996 as one of the league's ten charter members. The franchise is the league's most successful team.

The Galaxy were founded in 1994 and are owned by Anschutz Entertainment Group (also owners of the Los Angeles Kings, as well as an interest in the Los Angeles Lakers). In their early years, the club played home games at the Rose Bowl in Pasadena, California. Since 2003, they have played at Dignity Health Sports Park in Carson, California. The team holds a rivalry with the San Jose Earthquakes in the California Clásico and used to play the SuperClasico against city rivals Chivas USA before that team folded in 2014. Following the league's dissolution of Chivas USA, a new expansion team, Los Angeles FC (LAFC), was formed in 2014 and began play in 2018; the new LA rivalry was dubbed "El Tráfico".

The Galaxy have won a record six MLS Cups in ten Finals appearances, the Western Conference regular-season title eight times, four Supporters' Shields, two U.S. Open Cups, and one CONCACAF Champions' Cup title. In 2024, the Galaxy won a record-extending sixth MLS Cup, and broke the record for most goals during a playoff campaign with 18 goals.

In 2007, the club made international headlines with the signing of English player David Beckham from Real Madrid, the most high-profile transaction with MLS to that point. The club has fielded other high-profile international players including Robbie Keane, Zlatan Ibrahimović, Marco Reus, Steven Gerrard, Luis Hernández, Javier Hernández, Sergi Roberto, and American Landon Donovan, who is the all-time leading scorer for the club. In 2019, Forbes estimated the club is the second most valuable in the league, worth about $480 million.

== History ==
=== Early years (1996–2000) ===
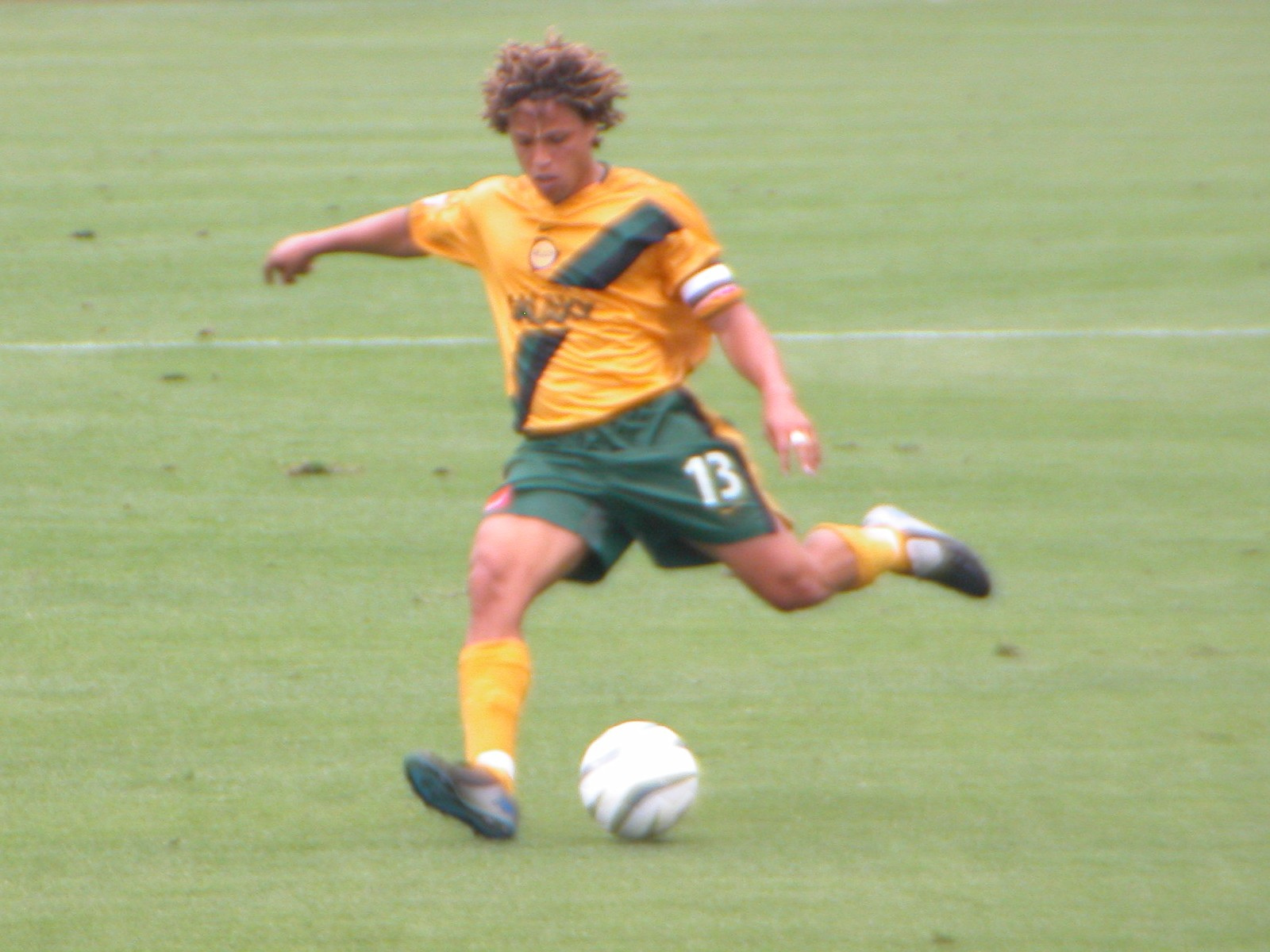
Cobi Jones, who played for the club from their inaugural season until his retirement in 2007

LA Galaxy is one of the 10 founding clubs in Major League Soccer. The name "Galaxy" was derived from Los Angeles being home to the "stars" of Hollywood. The team began competing in the first season of the then-new league, which took place in 1996.

In the inaugural season, the Galaxy finished first in the Western Conference and contested the first MLS Cup final, finishing as runners-up to D.C. United. In 1997, they started 1–7, but went 15–9 for the rest of the season to qualify for the playoffs. The Galaxy ended up second in their conference, losing to the Dallas Burn. In 1998, the Galaxy left off on a streak, eventually finishing 24–8. The Galaxy defeated the Dallas Burn, 9–3 on aggregate. They lost in the semi-final to the Chicago Fire 5–1 on aggregate.

The Galaxy again finished first in the Western Conference in 1999, with a final record of 20–12, with a win in the CONCACAF Champions' Cup, but lost to D.C. United again 2–0. The 2000 season had the Galaxy in second in the Western Division, at 14–10–8. Despite this, they lost to the Kansas City Wizards after a tied aggregate and a sudden-death game. The Galaxy won the CONCACAF Champions' Cup that same year, one of three American clubs to have won the tournament.

2001 was another successful year for Los Angeles, winning the Open Cup and scoring 1,000 all-time points, and with Cobi Jones scoring the 300th goal, but again they fell short by being defeated by Landon Donovan and the San Jose Earthquakes. Again the club clinched first in the Western Conference with a 16–9–3 record, their fifth time being first. The Galaxy were set to take part in FIFA Club World Championship as CONCACAF champions from the previous year, but the tournament was canceled.

=== First MLS Cup (2002) ===
In 2002, the Galaxy won their first MLS Cup in the club's fourth appearance by defeating the New England Revolution 1–0. In 2003, the Galaxy finished fourth playing more away games due to stadium construction, with the possible existing obstacles, the team finished 9–12–9. The Galaxy bounced back by gaining second with an 11–9–10 record. They lost to the Wizards in the final, 0–2.

In 2005, the Galaxy acquired Landon Donovan from San Jose. The franchise won the Open Cup again ending with a record of 13–13–6. Having qualified for the playoffs for the 2005 season, the Galaxy has been the only team to appear in the playoffs in all of the league's first ten seasons. They won the 2005 MLS Cup, defeating the New England Revolution in extra time, 1–0.

The 2006 season began on March 16 with the sudden death of Doug Hamilton, the team's 43-year-old general manager, who suffered a heart attack on board a plane carrying the team back from Costa Rica where they had played Saprissa in the CONCACAF Champions' Cup. The team finished fifth in the Western Conference, eliminating them from playoff contention for the first time since the league's inception. Midway through the season, Steve Sampson was sacked as head coach, replaced by Frank Yallop. The team managed to make a deep run to the U.S. Open Cup final, but lost 3–1 against the Chicago Fire.

=== Beckham era (2007–2012) ===
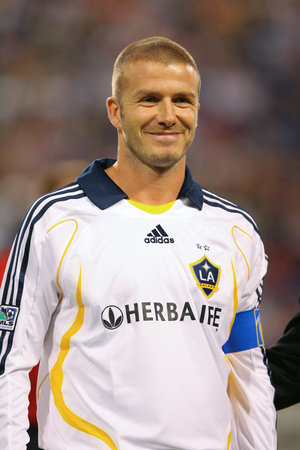
David Beckham with the Galaxy in 2007

In March 2007, Herbalife signed a five-year deal with the Galaxy, worth between $4–5 million a year, to be the club's primary shirt sponsor. Four months later, the club signed David Beckham from Real Madrid. His debut was made at Home Depot Center before a record crowd of nearly 35,000, including many celebrities, coming on in the 78th minute in a 1–0 loss to Chelsea in a match during the World Series of Football tournament. The match brought unprecedented TV coverage from ESPN, who used 19 cameras to cover it, including one trained only on Beckham, even when he was on the bench. In that season's SuperLiga, LA reached the final but lost to Mexican side Pachuca on penalties after extra time. LA nearly made the end-of-season play-offs, but were eliminated following a 1–0 loss to the Chicago Fire. In the off-season, Cobi Jones retired and, amidst rumors that he was going to be sacked, Yallop resigned as head coach following a friendly match at Home Depot Center. The San Jose Earthquakes bought out his contract and offered a third round draft pick to the Galaxy as compensation to hire Yallop as their new head coach. Yallop was replaced at LA by Ruud Gullit, who signed a three-year contract with the club, making him the highest paid coach in MLS history. Cobi Jones returned as assistant coach. LA went on a promotional tour of Australia and New Zealand, setting attendance records in both countries. 80,295 people showed up at Stadium Australia for the match between Sydney FC and LA Galaxy, which the home side won 5–3. They also played a tour of Asia, and competed in the inaugural Pan-Pacific Championship in Honolulu, finishing third after beating Sydney 2–1 in the third-place match.

In the 2008 MLS season, LA went on a seven-game winless streak that saw them drop from first place in the Western Conference to outside playoff contention, prompting the resignation of manager Ruud Gullit and firing of general manager Alexi Lalas. Gullit was replaced by Bruce Arena, who was unable to lead LA into a play-off spot, for the third-straight season.

In the following off-season, both club captain David Beckham and vice-captain Landon Donovan were involved in loan deals with European clubs until the beginning of the new MLS season; Beckham to Milan in Italy and Donovan to German club Bayern Munich. Donovan was seeking a permanent transfer to Munich, while Beckham was expected to return to LA in March, prior to the 2009 season. Beckham went on to seek a permanent transfer to Milan in a bid to sustain his England career through the 2010 World Cup, and Milan made a bid for the player that was rejected by LA. One day before his loan deal was to expire, Milan and LA reached an agreement to allow Beckham to stay in Italy until the conclusion of the Rossoneri's season in June, before returning to LA in July. Donovan was not offered a contract by Bayern, and returned to the U.S. in time for the beginning of the 2009 MLS season. In the book The Beckham Experiment by Grant Wahl, Donovan openly criticized Beckham for his handling of the loan deals. Beckham and Donovan would later reconcile upon Beckham's return to LA in July.

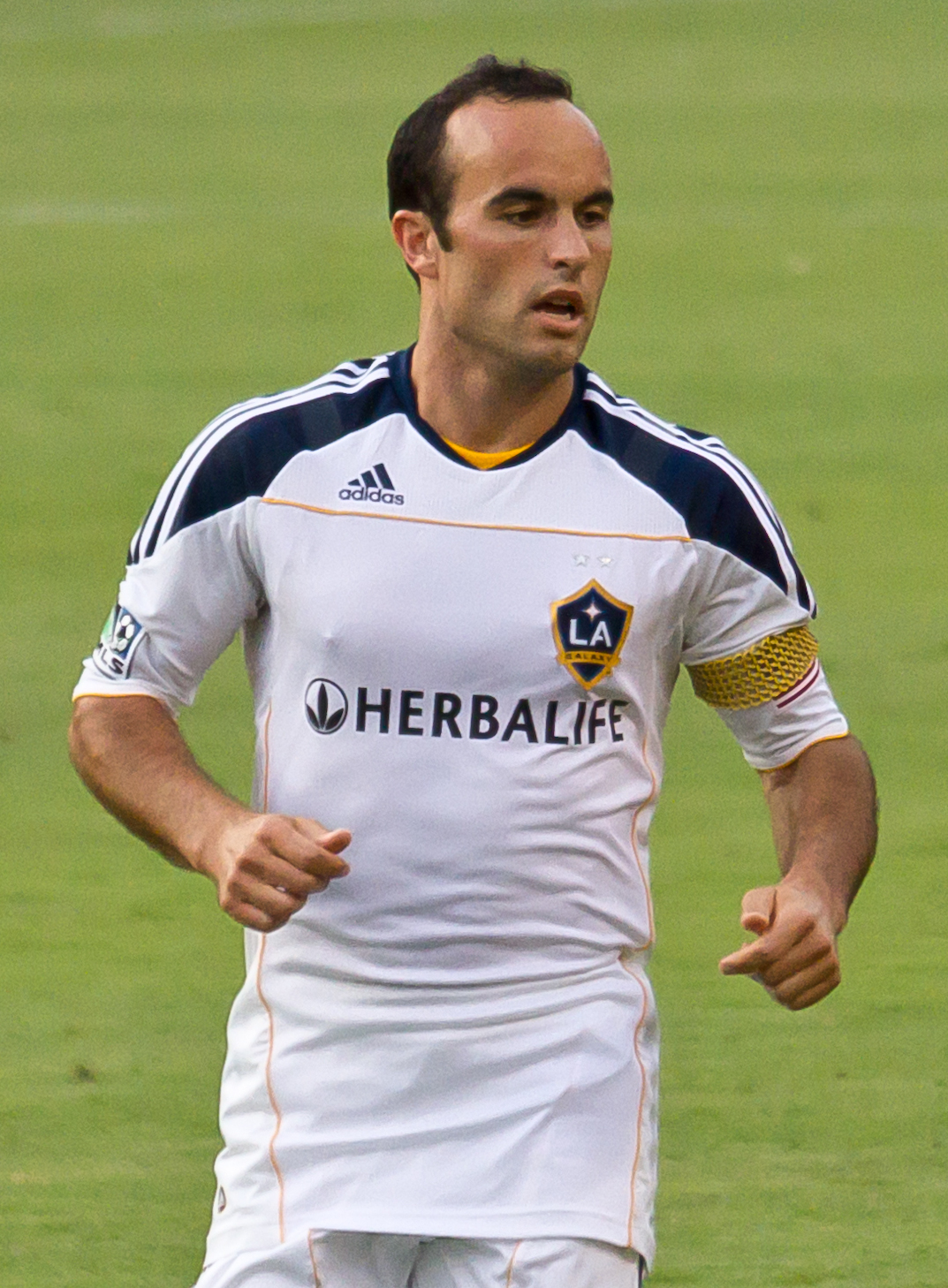
Landon Donovan playing for the Galaxy in 2010

LA finished the 2009 season top of the Western Conference and runners-up in the MLS Supporters' Shield, qualifying for the 2009 MLS Cup. They reached the final by beating Chivas USA 3–2 on aggregate in the quarter-final, and Houston Dynamo 2–0, after extra time, in the semi-final. In the final they drew 1–1 with Real Salt Lake at Qwest Field in Seattle, but lost 5–4 on penalties. By reaching the final, they qualified for the 2010–11 CONCACAF Champions League Preliminary Round.

After the 2009 success, both Donovan and Beckham again went out on second loan spells. Donovan went to Everton while Beckham returned to Milan, where he ruptured his Achilles tendon and therefore missed his chance at playing in the World Cup for England and subsequently missing most of the Galaxy's 2010 season.

In 2010, the Galaxy stayed at the top of the table and won the Supporters' Shield, the first time MLS played a balanced schedule. They then lost to FC Dallas in the Western Conference Final, one game away from making another appearance at MLS Cup.

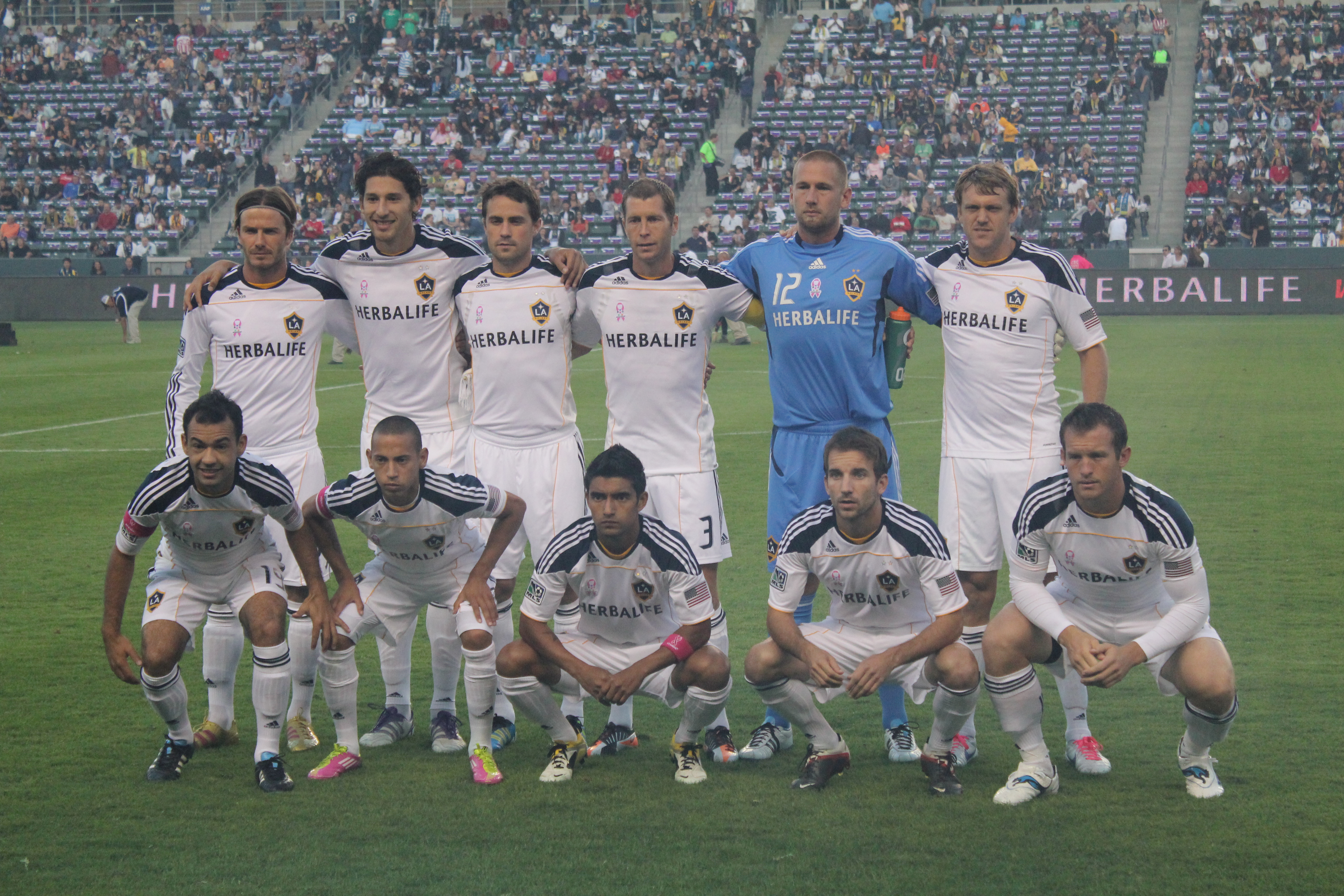
The Galaxy's starting line-up in 2011

In 2011, a year in which they added the Republic of Ireland's all-time leading goalscorer Robbie Keane, they won their fourth Supporters' Shield with two games remaining, becoming the third-straight team to win consecutive Shields while amassing the second-best points total in MLS history. They followed this up with their third MLS Cup, defeating the Houston Dynamo 1–0 in the final. The 2011 MLS Cup was the Galaxy's first MLS Cup Victory in regulation. The 2002 and the 2005 MLS Cup wins were won in overtime.

In January 2012, after much speculation, Beckham signed a new two-year deal with LA to secure his short-term future at the club. Despite the new contract, Beckham confirmed in November 2012 that he would be leaving the Galaxy at the end of the 2012 MLS season. On December 1, 2012, the Galaxy won their second-straight MLS Cup victory over the Houston Dynamo, 3–1. Galaxy defender Omar Gonzalez won the MLS MVP trophy, heading in the 1–1 equalizer in the 60th minute. That goal was quickly followed by a Donovan penalty kick, and Keane sealed the game with another penalty kick in stoppage time. In post-match interviews both Donovan and Beckham remained coy about their future MLS plans.

=== First to five league championships (2013–2016) ===
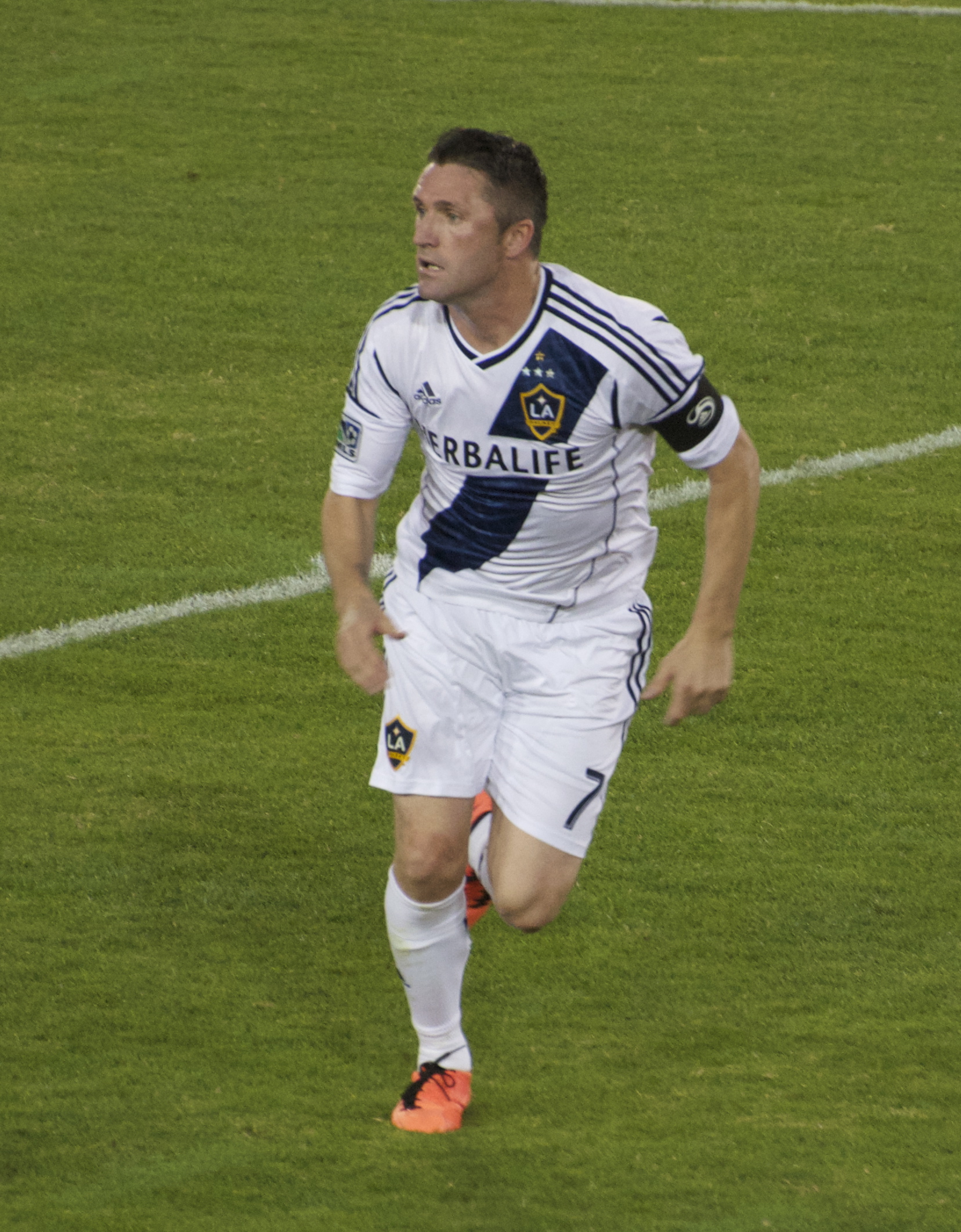
Galaxy captain Robbie Keane was the 2014 MLS Cup MVP.

On May 26, 2013, Robbie Rogers played his first match as a substitute for the Galaxy in a 4–0 win over the Seattle Sounders FC, becoming the first openly gay man to play in a top North American professional sports league.

The Galaxy finished the 2013 season third in the Western Conference. They reached the conference semi-finals, where they lost 2–1 to Real Salt Lake. They also reached the semi-finals of the 2012–13 CONCACAF Champions League, but lost 3–1 on aggregate to Mexican team Monterrey.

Following the defeat to Seattle Sounders FC in the final game of the season with the Supporters' Shield on the line, the team entered the 2014 MLS playoffs defeating Real Salt Lake, advancing to face Seattle once again in the Western Conference Finals, advancing to the MLS Cup by away goals. They played the New England Revolution in the 2014 MLS Cup and won 2–1 in overtime, thereby becoming five-time champions, a league record. At the end of the season, longtime LA Galaxy and United States national team player Landon Donovan retired.

On January 7, 2015, the LA Galaxy announced the signing of long time Liverpool player Steven Gerrard to an 18-month Designated Player contract, reportedly worth $9 million. He joined the team in July 2015 following the end of the 2014–15 Premier League season, and made his debut in an International Champions Cup against Club América on July 11.

The club again made headlines by acquiring Mexican star and Barcelona academy product Giovani dos Santos in July as a designated player. Not since the days of Jorge Campos, Carlos Hermosillo and Luis Hernández in the late 1990s and early 2000s had the Galaxy had a notable Mexican player, let alone one in the prime of his career. Dos Santos made an impactful impression on the Galaxy early on, scoring on his club debut against Central FC in the CONCACAF Champions League and then in his league debut against the Sounders. In his first five club matches, he had a goal, an assist or both to total with four goals and five assists in that span.

=== Wooden Spoon and rebuilding (2016–2023) ===
Before the start of the 2016 season, it was announced that long-time servicing center-back Omar Gonzalez would leave the Galaxy after nine years to C.F. Pachuca.

On November 22, 2016, long-time general manager and head coach Bruce Arena left the club to begin his second stint as head coach of the United States national team, bringing most of the Galaxy's coaching staff with him, including associate head coach Dave Sarachan. Arena was replaced as general manager by former Galaxy player Peter Vagenas, and as head coach by his LA Galaxy II counterpart, Curt Onalfo.

The front office constructed the team to rely on players from the academy and Galaxy II system. Multiple injuries exposed the naive roster construction, which included erratic performances by Jermaine Jones, and sparse production from Giovanni Dos Santos. With a 6–10–4 record, the Galaxy fired Curt Onalfo and replaced him with former head coach Sigi Schmid on July 27, 2017. Under Schmid, the club went 2–8–4 and finished the season in last place overall with a mark of 8–18–8. It was only the fourth time that the club failed to make the postseason, and the club's first wooden spoon.

Zlatan Ibrahimović playing with the Galaxy in 2019

In March 2018, the team signed Zlatan Ibrahimović on a two-year, $3 million contract with targeted allocation money. The Swede made his debut in the inaugural El Tráfico match against LAFC, scoring two goals to end the game with the Galaxy coming from 0–3 down to win 4–3. One of the goals Ibrahimović scored in that game later received the MLS Goal of the Year award. Los Angeles throughout the season dealt with defensive struggles, and in their last match of the regular season, against Houston Dynamo, the Galaxy were defeated and once again missed the postseason.

After the 2018 season, the Galaxy ended Ibrahimović's original deal and signed him to a new and higher salaried designated player contract. On March 1, 2019, the team announced they had exercised its one offseason Buyout of a Guaranteed Contract on Giovani dos Santos, thus releasing him from the team.

In the 2019 season, the Galaxy welcomed Guillermo Barros Schelotto to the club as head coach. The Galaxy also added a number of players, notably Uruguayan Diego Polenta, Argentine World Cup veteran Cristian Pavón, fellow Argentine Favio Álvarez and Mexican Uriel Antuna. With this, and the emergence of academy product Efraín Álvarez, the Galaxy placed fifth in the West and made the playoffs. The season was best remembered for Ibrahimović's performances against LAFC, including a hat-trick at home in July and a brace in Banc of California Stadium that August. Ibrahimović finished the season with 30 goals, the second-highest mark in the season and third-highest total in league history (with the record being broken by LAFC's Carlos Vela that year). In the playoffs, the Galaxy defeated Minnesota United FC 2–1 before falling to LAFC, 5–3. Ibrahimović left the club in November, and of the 2019 signings—most of them on loan—only Pavón returned for 2020.

Three years later, in December 2022, MLS sanctioned the Galaxy for the 2019 Pavón signing, stripping the club of $1 million in allocation money and suspending club president Chris Klein. Moreover, the club was not allowed to sign international players in the 2023 summer transfer window.

The club arranged for a transfer from La Liga club Sevilla, signing a three-year contract with Javier "Chicharito" Hernandez on January 21, 2020, and making him the highest-paid player in the league. At the end of the season, after failing to making the postseason, head coach Guillermo Barros Schelotto was fired, and replaced with Dominic Kinnear as interim manager. On January 5, the Galaxy announced Greg Vanney as the new manager.

Under Vanney, the Galaxy narrowly missed the MLS playoffs in 2021, finishing eighth in the Western Conference (15th overall). In 2022, the club showed marked improvement, punctuated by the continued improvement of Hernández (who scored 18 goals) and the signings of former Barcelona youth product Riqui Puig and European veteran Gastón Brugman. The Galaxy finished fourth in the West (eighth overall), their highest mark since 2016, and beat Nashville SC at home in the first round of the MLS Cup playoffs before falling again to their crosstown rivals LAFC in the conference semifinals, 3−2, at the last minute. Hernández was named the team's player of the year that season.

=== MLS Cup championship return (2023–present) ===
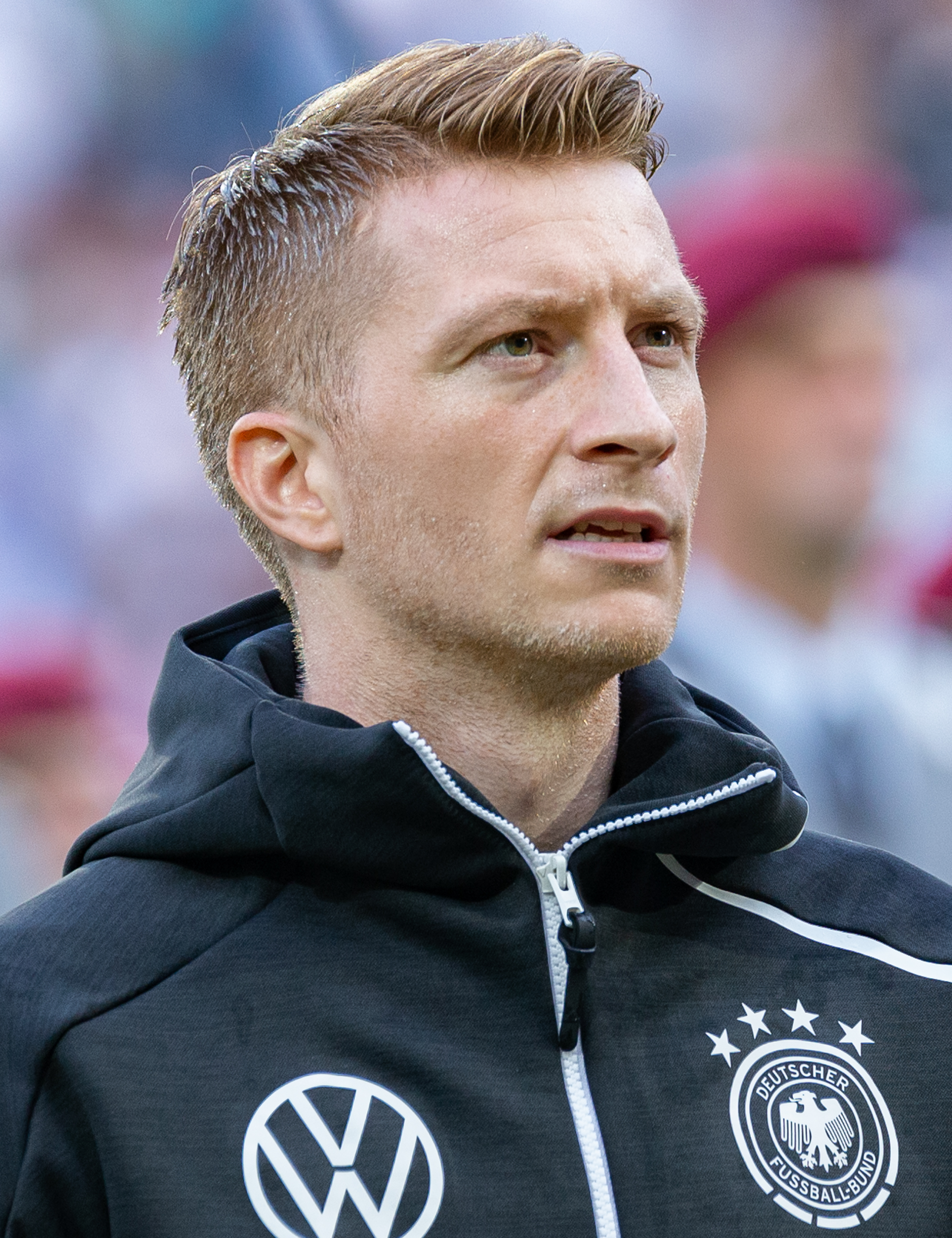
The Galaxy signed former German international Marco Reus in 2024.

In the offseason leading up to 2023, team president Chris Klein was suspended through the primary transfer window due to evidence of undisclosed payments involving the team's 2019 signing of Cristian Pavon, which MLS reported should have been classified as a designated player. The league's sanctions on the Galaxy meant that the team could not make any international signings during the 2023 summer transfer window. Despite these punishments, Klein signed a multi-year extension with the team. In response, Galaxy supporter group leaders announced a unified boycott, refusing to attend any home games until he was removed from his position.

The Galaxy began 2023 with their worst start to a season in club history, winless in their first seven games while twice ending up at the bottom of the league's overall standings. After a loss to Charlotte FC in May, Galaxy supporters were seen involved in a shouting match with manager Greg Vanney, who had assumed control of the team's soccer operations in the wake of Klein's suspension. In the aftermath, ESPN ranked the Galaxy 29 of 29 in their MLS power rankings, saying they were "not a serious club". On May 30, 2023, the Galaxy officially announced they had parted ways with Klein.

In 2024, the Galaxy introduced top signings in attackers Joseph Paintsil and Gabriel Pec, while letting Douglas Costa and Chicharito leave the club. This marked a shift in philosophy from a club focused on signing world-famous players and toward one with lesser-known yet well-regarded players who could thrive in MLS. The Galaxy narrowly missed first place, finishing level on points total (64) with their local foes LAFC, but losing on tiebreakers. During the regular season, the four-man attack of Riqui Puig, Serbian striker Dejan Joveljić, Paintsil and Pec provided 54 of the team's 69 MLS goals, equaling their highest output since 1998 (matched in the MLS Cup-winning 2014 campaign). The Galaxy defeated Colorado Rapids in a two-game first round series (scoring nine goals in the round), then beat Minnesota United by a 6−2 margin and the Seattle Sounders in a tightly contested 1–0 Western Conference final to advance to their first MLS Cup since 2014. Puig assisted Joveljić on the winning goal in the 85th minute; the next day, it was revealed that Puig had torn his ACL earlier in the game, thus ending his season. On December 7, the Galaxy defeated the New York Red Bulls 2–1 to win their sixth MLS Cup in club history, their first in exactly ten years. The Galaxy also recorded the most goals in playoffs history with 18 across the campaign.

Puig's ACL tear caused him to miss all of the 2025 season. The Galaxy struggled significantly without him, as their 2025 campaign set the record for longest winless streak to start a season in MLS history. They finished fourteenth of fifteen teams in the Western Conference, narrowly avoiding another wooden spoon, and did not win a game on the road. Despite their struggles, the Galaxy finished third in the 2025 Leagues Cup, qualifying them for a spot in the 2026 CONCACAF Champions Cup.

Riqui Puig was expected to return in time for the 2026 season, but in the offseason, it was revealed that he suffered a setback in his recovery and would require further surgery that would cause him to miss another season.

== Colors and badge ==
Los Angeles Galaxy first logo (1996–2007)

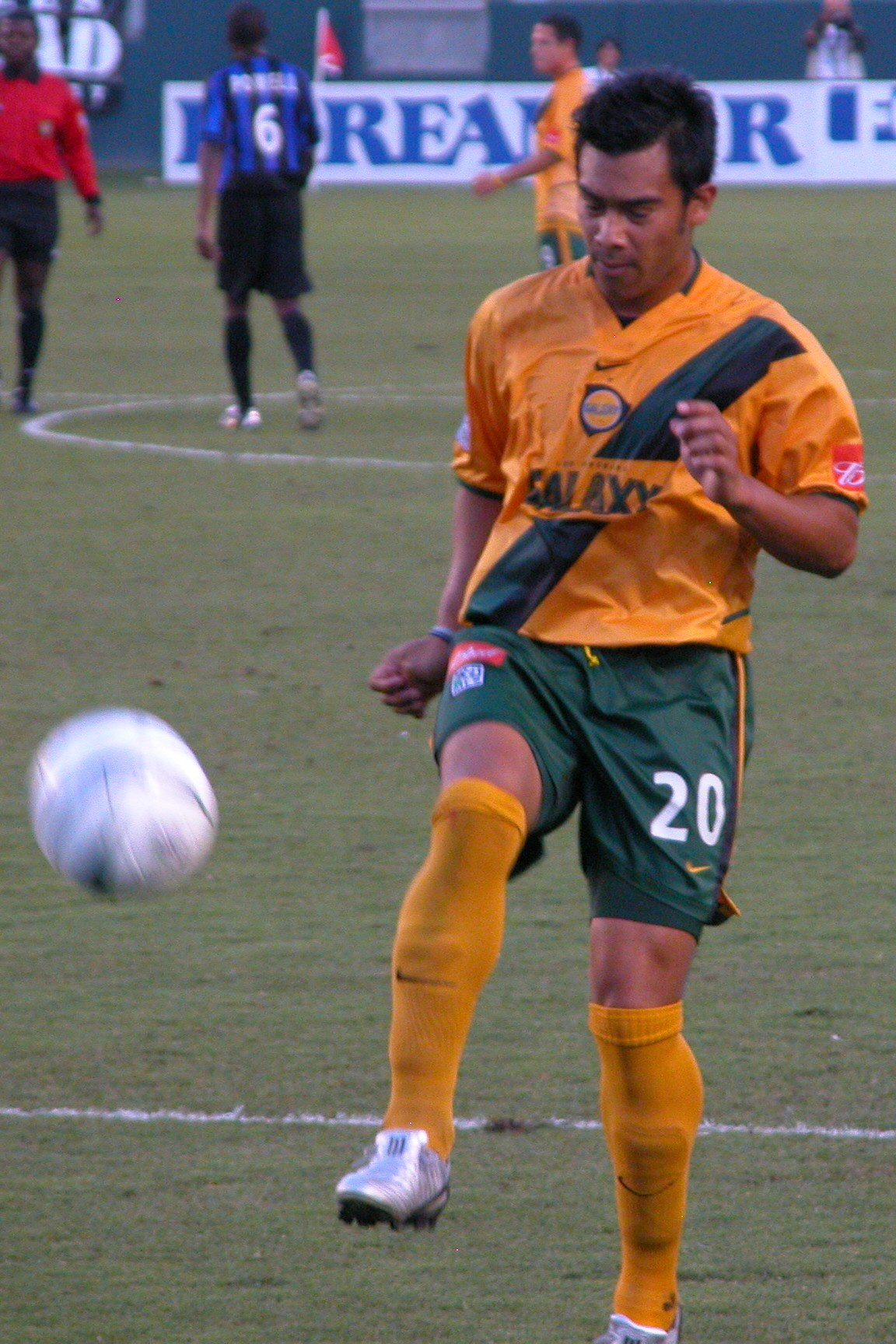
Carlos Ruiz wearing the Galaxy's old gold-and-green uniform in 2004

The LA Galaxy's current team colors are navy blue, gold, and white. The team's primary uniform is white and the secondary uniform is blue. The colors were adopted to coincide with David Beckham's arrival with the team in 2007 as part of an overall re-branding exercise spearheaded by then GM Alexi Lalas. Before 2007, the Galaxy played in various color combinations, usually comprising gold, teal green and white with black accents, and often highlighting an iconic sash design from the left shoulder and across the chest. Their original jersey, used in the inaugural 1996 MLS season, reflected the colors of the city of Los Angeles and featured black-and-teal halves, black sleeves with gold and red accents, black shorts and black socks.

The Galaxy have had two logos to date. The original brand was gold, teal and black, and featured the Galaxy wordmark superimposed over a golden swirl, with a stylized black outline. The logo was changed in 2007, again to coincide with David Beckham's arrival, and now features a blue shield with a gold border, the LA Galaxy team name, and a quasar at the top of the crest.

The quasar, featured prominently on the LA Galaxy's shield, was originally featured on the 1957 Seal of Los Angeles County, as well as the modified Seal of Los Angeles County, California.

The name "Galaxy" was created by Nike at the conception of the league; the apparel company was also the original uniform supplier for the team.

== Club operations ==
The Galaxy first turned a profit in 2003, becoming the first MLS team to do so. After the team moved into the new Home Depot Center, the team saw increased attendance, a doubling of revenue from sponsors, and revenues from parking and concessions.

A Forbes 2015 report ranked the LA Galaxy second in MLS in terms of annual revenue ($44 million) and in franchise value ($240 million). The Galaxy earn more in annual club sponsorship income ($14 million) and annual local TV rights ($5 million) than any other MLS team. The Galaxy have the highest annual revenue of any MLS team, the third highest revenue of any CONCACAF team, and the seventh highest revenue of any team in the Americas.

=== Kit sponsors ===
Period	Kit manufacturer	Shirt sponsor	Sleeve sponsors
1996–2002	Nike	—	—
2003–2005	Nike	Budweiser	—
2006–2007	Adidas	Budweiser	—
2007–2020	Adidas	Herbalife	—
2021	Adidas	Herbalife	Honey; Herbalife
2022–2024	Adidas	Herbalife	Honey
2025–present	Adidas	Herbalife	RBC

== Stadium ==
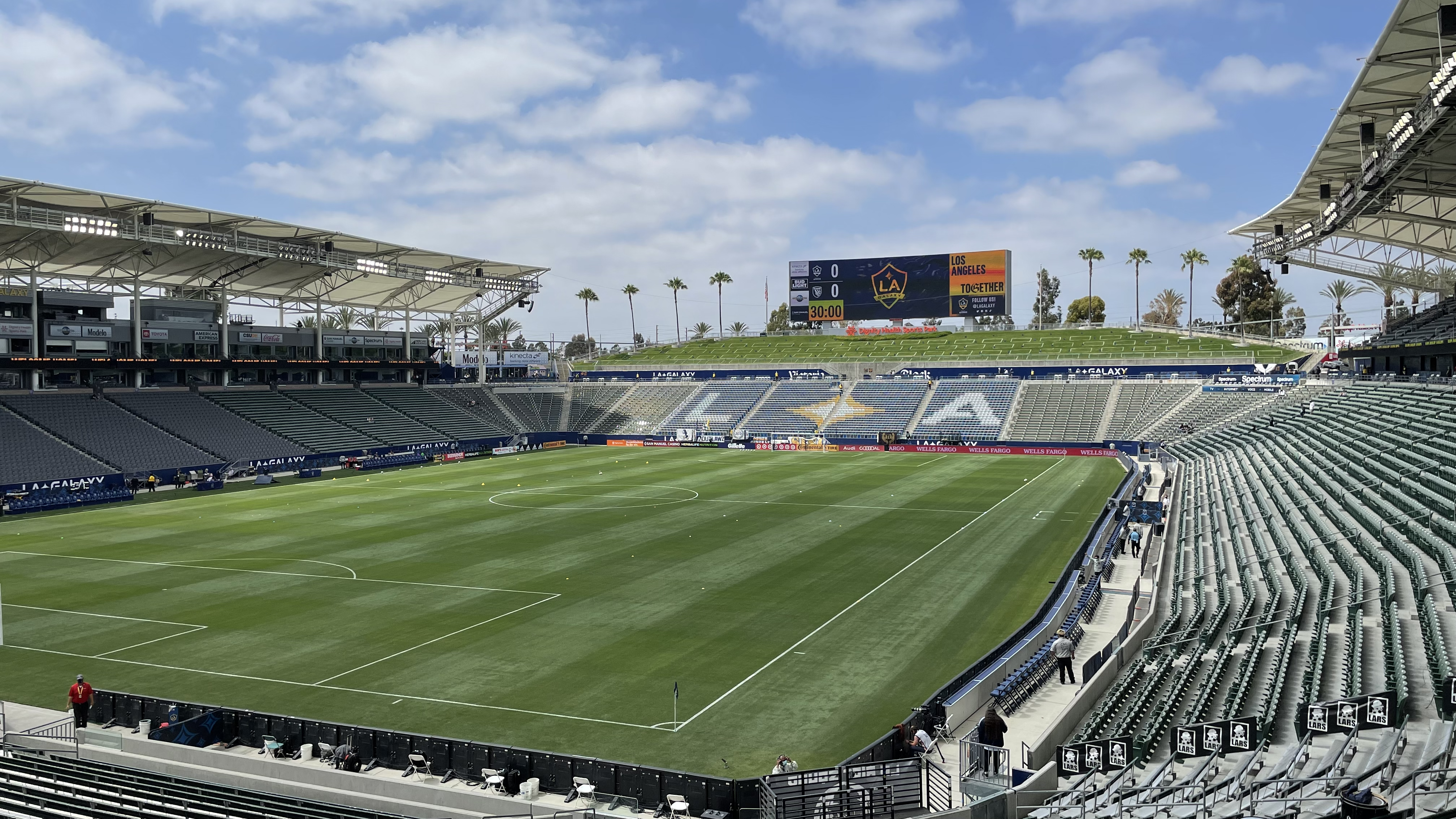
Dignity Health Sports Park, the Galaxy's home stadium since 2003

From 1996 to 2002, the Galaxy played their home games at the Rose Bowl in Pasadena, which initially seated over 104,000 people, later reduced in 1998 to approximately 93,000. Between 1999 and 2011, U.S. Open Cup games were regularly held at the 10,000-seat Titan Stadium on the campus of California State University, Fullerton. The Galaxy played 10 games in total at Titan Stadium, including the U.S. Open Cup Final in 2001 when the Galaxy won the tournament. In 2023 and 2024, the Galaxy returned to the Rose Bowl for one game each season to host the El Tráfico games.

Period	Venue	Location
1996–2002	Rose Bowl	Pasadena, California
1999–2011 (U.S. Open Cup)	Titan Stadium	Fullerton, California
2003–present	Dignity Health Sports Park	Carson, California

In 2003, the Galaxy moved to Dignity Health Sports Park (then known as the Home Depot Center, later known as StubHub Center), on the campus of California State University, Dominguez Hills in Carson, approximately ten miles south of downtown Los Angeles. The stadium is a 27,000-seat soccer-specific stadium, the second of its kind in MLS, but has hosted other sports such as rugby and American football. From 2005 to 2014, the Galaxy shared the stadium with their now-defunct league rivals Chivas USA, with whom they competed in the SuperClasico.

== Club culture ==
=== Cozmo ===
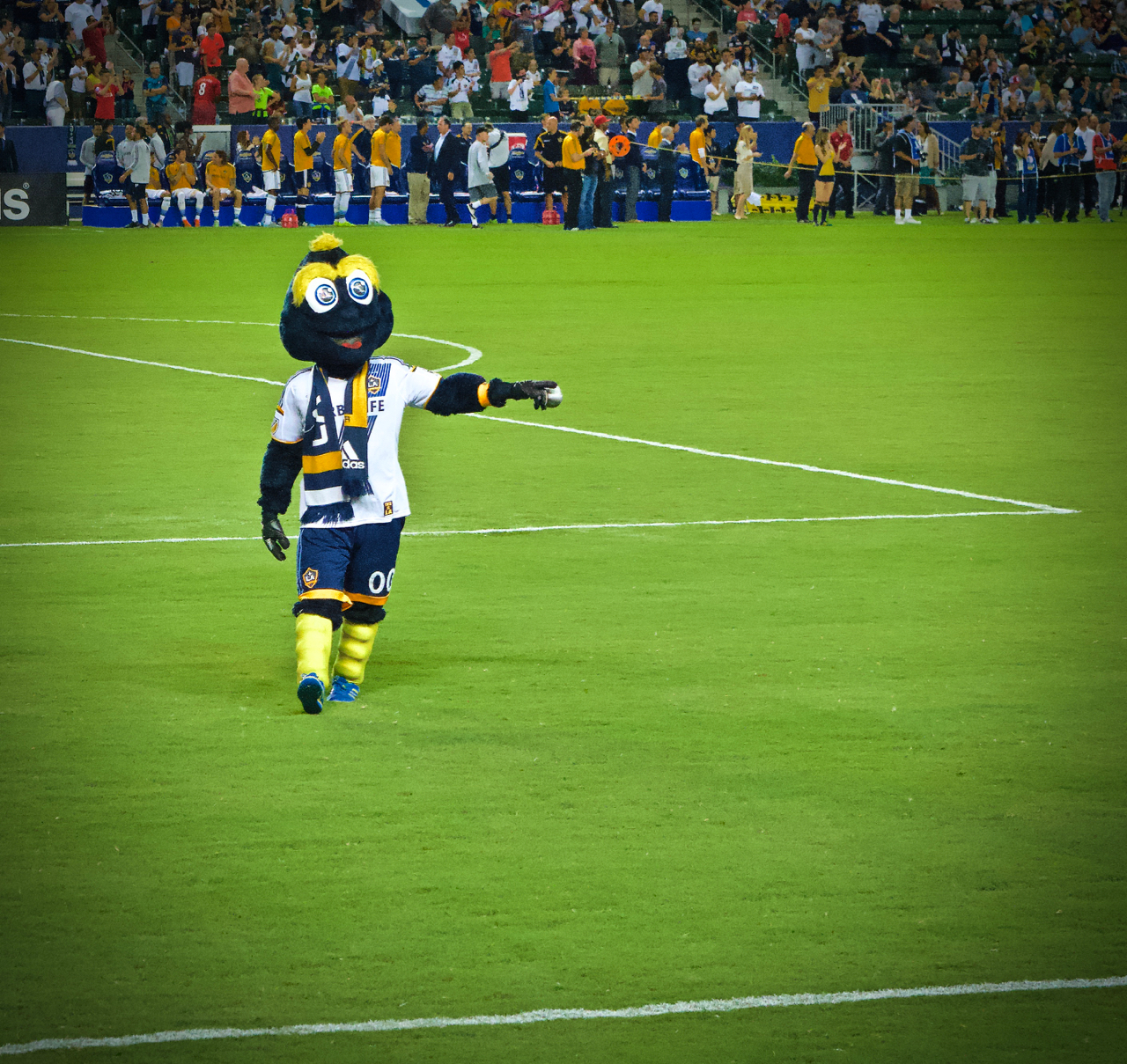
LA Galaxy mascot Cozmo at Dignity Health Sports Park, 2015

Cozmo is the Galaxy's mascot. He has dark blue skin with yellow eyebrows and white eyes matching the Galaxy's home uniform colors. He replaced the Galaxy's original mascot, "Twizzle", who also looked like it was from outer space but was more humanoid in form, wearing a space-man's helmet and cape. Twizzle has since made occasional appearances at select Galaxy games, cheering on the team alongside Cozmo.

=== Galaxy Star squad ===
The Galaxy Star Squad is the official cheerleaders of the club. They often attend events hosted by the Galaxy, such as autograph sessions, and can be often seen around the stadium during game time giving away scarves and supporting the team.

=== Supporters ===
The Angel City Brigade was created in 2007 to help establish a festive and vibrant atmosphere in Dignity Health Sports Park for the Galaxy. They were originally located in section 121 in the General Admission area of the stadium.

The LA Riot Squad formed after a loss in the 2001 MLS Cup, when then-Galaxy keeper Kevin Hartman challenged a group of Galaxy fans to form a supporter group of 100 people by opening day of 2002. The reward if they were able to do this was a keg of beer. They are located in sections 137 and 138 in the General Admission area of the stadium.

The Galaxians are the first and original supporter group of the LA Galaxy, having been established in 1996 during the Galaxy's first season in MLS. They were originally located in section 124.

Galaxy Outlawz is the latest group started in 2019. They now join the Galaxians and the Angel City Brigade in the new safe standing section in the north end.

Victoria Block is the newest safe standing only section built in 2020 replacing all of the bleachers from sections 120 to 123 in the north end of the stadium. It is the new supporters only section and new home for the Galaxians, Angel City Brigade, and Galaxy Outlawz.

=== Ring of Honor ===
Tenure	Name
2002–2006	Doug Hamilton
1996–2003	Mauricio Cienfuegos
2007–2012	David Beckham
2005–2014 2016	Landon Donovan

== Rivalries ==
=== San Jose Earthquakes ===
The Galaxy's longest-running rivalry match is the California Clásico, played against the San Jose Earthquakes. It is considered among the fiercest and longest-running rivalries in American soccer. The intrastate rivalry dates to the founding of MLS, and their encounters in the MLS Cup playoffs and final. Some also cite that the rivalry developed in reflection of traditional Northern California—Southern California sports rivalries.

=== Los Angeles FC ===
When Los Angeles FC (LAFC) joined the league in 2018 as an expansion team, a new crosstown rivalry was born. The Galaxy's current record vs LAFC, through 2022, is 7–5–5 (including 0–2 in the playoffs).

=== Chivas USA ===
From 2005 to 2014, the Galaxy were rivals with Chivas USA (now defunct), with whom they shared the same stadium, in the SuperClasico. This contest, with Chivas USA, was dominated by the Galaxy, who won 22 of the 34 encounters. The rivalry was the only intra-stadium rivalry in MLS until Chivas ceased operations at the end of the 2014 season.

== Broadcasting ==
From 2023, every Galaxy match is available via MLS Season Pass on the Apple TV app. Select matches also air on FOX Sports via FOX or FS1. Prior to this international all-streaming deal, the Galaxy appeared on a number of TV stations in the Southern California area throughout its first 27 years of existence.

At the end of the 2011 season, the Galaxy announced a ten-year, $55 million deal with Time Warner Cable (now Charter Spectrum), the most lucrative local media contract in MLS history, to begin at the end of the 2012 MLS season. Previously, Galaxy matches were televised regionally in English on Fox Sports West or Prime Ticket. While awaiting the launch of those networks, all 2012 English-language matches were broadcast on local outlet KDOC, with one match showcased on Time Warner Cable SportsNet near the end of the season. In Spanish, 2012 matches were shown on independent outlet KWHY with Adrian Garcia Marquez and Francisco Pinto commentating. Television commentary was handled by Joe Tutino and former Galaxy player Cobi Jones, and the radio stream was broadcast on the club's website.

Until they stopped broadcasting MLS in 2023, ESPN carried most games on its ESPN+ platform for out-of-market viewers, as well as showing nationally televised broadcasts on ESPN, ESPN2, or ABC. When Univisión broadcast a nationally televised game on its main network, UniMás, or TUDN, the match stream was also available on Twitter.

After the launch of MLS Season Pass in 2023, Joe Tutino became the sole radio announcer for all Galaxy games. The radio feed is broadcast on the club's website and social media pages.

== Players and staff ==
For details on former players, see All-time Los Angeles Galaxy roster.

=== Roster ===
As of August 17, 2026

Note: Flags indicate national team as defined under FIFA eligibility rules; some limited exceptions apply. Players may hold more than one non-FIFA nationality.

No.	Pos.	Nation	Player
1	GK	SRB	Novak Mićović
2	DF	BRA	Lucas Calegari
3	DF	ARG	Julián Aude
4	DF	JPN	Maya Yoshida (captain)
5	DF	NOR	Jakob Glesnes
6	DF	ESP	Sergi Roberto
7	FW	JPN	Kyōgo Furuhashi
8	MF	URU	Lucas Sanabria
10	MF	ESP	Riqui Puig (DP)
11	FW	MEX	Hirving Lozano (DP; on loan from San Diego FC)
12	GK	USA	JT Marcinkowski
14	DF	USA	John Nelson
15	MF	USA	Justin Haak
16	MF	USA	Isaiah Parente

No.	Pos.	Nation	Player
17	MF	ARG	Pablo Ruiz
18	FW	GER	Marco Reus
20	DF	USA	Chris Rindov
21	FW	FIN	Robert Taylor
22	MF	USA	Elijah Wynder
25	DF	COL	Carlos Garcés
26	DF	USA	Harbor Miller
27	MF	GER	Erik Thommy
28	FW	GHA	Joseph Paintsil (DP)
31	GK	USA	Brady Scott
50	DF	USA	Riley Dalgado
76	FW	USA	Troy Elgersma
99	FW	BRA	João Klauss (DP)

==== On loan ====
Note: Flags indicate national team as defined under FIFA eligibility rules; some limited exceptions apply. Players may hold more than one non-FIFA nationality.

No.	Pos.	Nation	Player
24	FW	USA	Ruben Ramos (on loan to Sporting Kansas City)
30	MF	CRC	Gino Vivi (on loan to Tampa Bay Rowdies)

No.	Pos.	Nation	Player
51	DF	CMR	Ascel Essengue (on loan to Phoenix Rising)
—	FW	USA	Tucker Lepley (on loan to Oakland Roots)

=== Technical staff ===
As of February 28, 2025

Role	Name	Nation
General manager	Will Kuntz	United States
Technical director	Mikkel Dencher	Denmark
Sr. Director, Player personnel & compliance	Gordon Klještan	United States
Personnel specialist	Oliver Curry	United States
Senior advisor to the general manager	Juninho	Brazil
Head coach	Greg Vanney	United States
Assistant coach	Dan Calichman	United States
Assistant coach	Nick Theslof	United States
Assistant coach	Jason Bent	Canada
Goalkeeper coach	Kevin Hartman	United States
Assistant coach and director of video analysis	Sam Green	England
Director, Cognitive performance	Michael Rabasca	United States
Head coach, Ventura County FC	Matthew Taylor	United States
Assistant coach, Ventura County FC	Alex Yi	United States
Goalkeeper coach, Ventura County FC	Ian Feuer	United States
Video analyst, Ventura County FC	Grant Heywood	England
Performance coach, Ventura County FC	Luke Garcia	Canada
Director, development and methodology	Mike Muñoz	United States
U-17 coach and director of IDPs	Shaun Tsakiris	United States
U-14 coach	Jay Gomez	United States
U-13 coach	Sam Al-Basith	England
LA Galaxy U15 head coach	Jean-Pierre Mujica	Peru
Head of academy goalkeeper coach	Jonathyn Lomeli	United States
Director, high performance & innovation	Jim Liston	United States
Assistant coach, performance & sports science	Tom Williams	Wales
Head strength & conditioning coach	Adam Waterson	Australia
Strength & conditioning coach, LA Galaxy II	Kendrick Watson	Costa Rica
Head of academy performance coach	Carlos Gomez	Mexico
Sports performance dietitian	Erica Capellino	United States
Sports performance dietitian	Ashley Porterfield	United States
Director, sports medicine	Brian Lee	United States
Head athletic trainer	Cesar Roldán	United States
Athletic trainer, First team	Julie Beveridge	United States
Head athletic trainer, LA Galaxy II	Julius Murphy	United States
Head athletic trainer, LA Galaxy Academy	Madison Schultze	United States
Athletic trainer, LA Galaxy Academy	Kathia Aquino	United States
Team chiropractor and scar tissue specialist	Shunta Shimizu	United States
Rehab specialist	Luciano Tavares	Brazil
Sr. Manager, team operations	Zack Murshedi	United States
Manager, team operations, LA Galaxy II	Chris Howe	England
Coordinator, team administration	Alexander Moreno	United States
Head equipment manager	Raul Vargas	Mexico
Equipment manager	Jose Vargas	Mexico
Equipment assistant	Jose Vega	El Salvador
Equipment manager, LA Galaxy II	Bryan Gonzalez	United States
Equipment manager, LA Galaxy Academy	Tony Hernandez	United States
Director, Education	Nyssa Tsakiris	United States
Academic learning advisor	Brian Irvin	United States
Academic learning advisor	Teresa Villareal	United States
Team orthopedist	Bert Mandelbaum	United States
Chief medical officer, Primary care physician	Josh Scott	United States
Team neuropsychologist	Dave Lechuga	United States
Team dentist	Dr. Iman Abdeshahian	Switzerland
Team chiropractors	George Billauer	United States
Team ophthalmologist	Rom Kandavel	United States
Team podiatrist	Howard Liebeskind	United States

=== General managers ===
Tenure	Name
1994–1998	Danny Villanueva
1999–2000	Sergio del Prado
2000–2001	Tim Luce
2002–2006	Doug Hamilton
2006–2008	Alexi Lalas
2008–2016	Bruce Arena
2016–2017	Peter Vagenas
2017–2018	Sigi Schmid
2018–2021	Dennis te Kloese
2024-	Will Kuntz

=== Head coaches ===
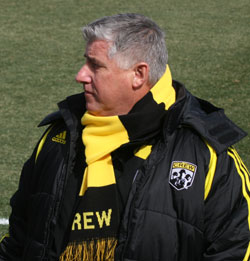
Sigi Schmid (pictured here with the Columbus Crew) led the Galaxy to their first MLS Cup title in 2002.

As of January 2022

Tenure	Name	Nation
1996 – June 10, 1997	Lothar Osiander	United States
June 10, 1997 – April 23, 1999	Octavio Zambrano	Ecuador
April 22, 1999 – August 16, 2004	Sigi Schmid	Germany
August 18, 2004 – June 6, 2006	Steve Sampson	United States
June 7, 2006 – November 5, 2007	Frank Yallop	Canada
November 9, 2007 – August 11, 2008	Ruud Gullit	Netherlands
August 11, 2008 – August 18, 2008	Cobi Jones (interim)	United States
August 18, 2008 – November 22, 2016	Bruce Arena	United States
December 13, 2016 – July 27, 2017	Curt Onalfo	United States
July 27, 2017 – September 10, 2018	Sigi Schmid	Germany
September 10, 2018 – December 28, 2018	Dominic Kinnear (interim)	United States
January 2, 2019 – October 29, 2020	Guillermo Barros Schelotto	Argentina
October 29, 2020 – November 8, 2020	Dominic Kinnear (interim)	United States
January 5, 2021 – present	Greg Vanney	United States

== Youth development ==
=== Ventura County FC ===
The Galaxy created the LA Galaxy II reserve team in January 2014 to compete in the USL. In their inaugural season, Los Dos finished third with a record of 15–6–7, and reached the semi-final where they lost to Sacramento Republic FC. For the 2015 USL season, the Galaxy were placed in the Western Conference. On March 15, 2024, at 04:42 PM the team announced a partial relocation to Thousand Oaks, California and rebranded to Ventura County FC.

=== Academy ===
As part of its development program, the Galaxy operates an academy system with U-18 and U-16 teams competing in the U.S. Soccer Development Academy, and U-14 and U-12 teams competing in Southern California Developmental Soccer Leagues (SCDSL). Recent academy graduates include: Jack McBean, Oscar Sorto, Jose Villarreal, Gyasi Zardes, Raul Mendiola, Bradford Jamieson IV, and Efraín Álvarez.

=== Alliance clubs ===
The LA Galaxy extended its youth development program and structure through the integration of existing youth clubs that have partnered under the LA Galaxy name. Known as the LA Galaxy Academy Alliance Clubs, they are located throughout Southern California, retain some autonomy and have access to LA Galaxy resources and outreach programs. One alliance club, LA Galaxy Orange County, has a men's category competing in the United Premier Soccer League.

== Honors ==
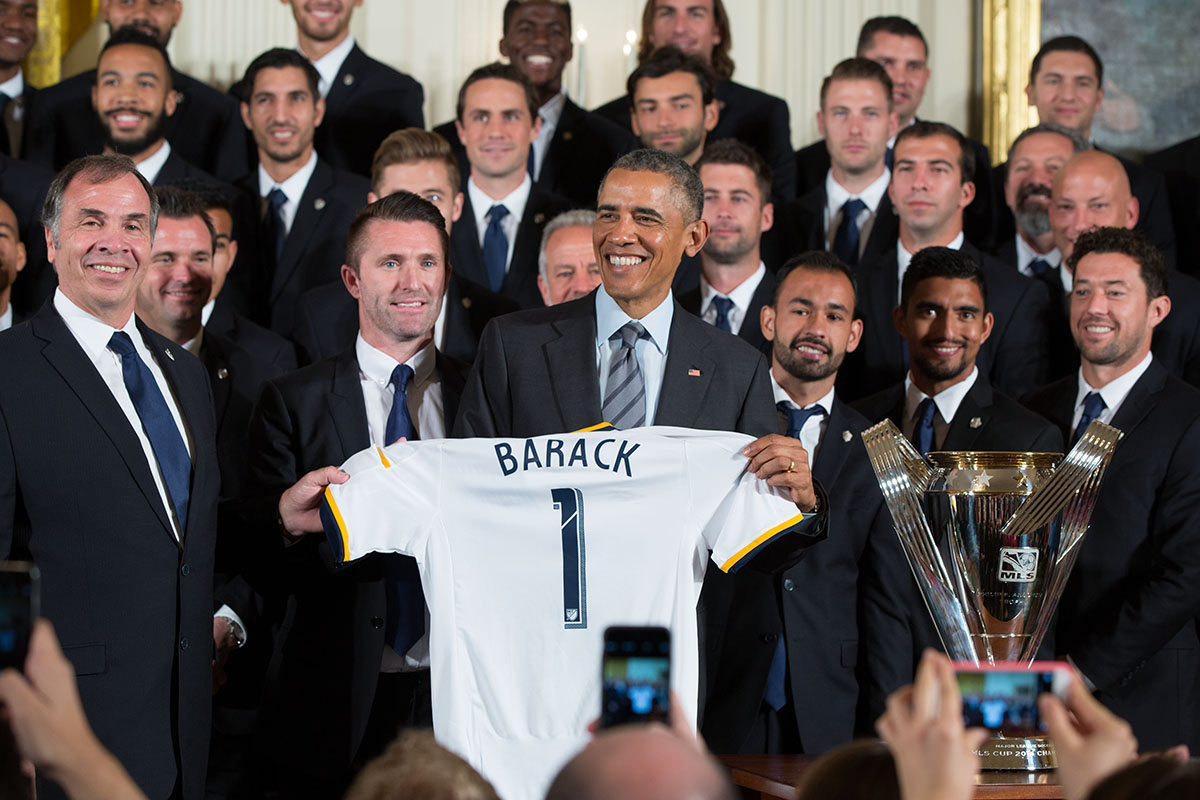
U.S. President Barack Obama presented with a team jersey during an event to welcome 2014 MLS Cup champions the LA Galaxy in the East Room of the White House on February 2, 2015

Domestic
Competitions	Titles	Seasons
MLS Cup	6	2002, 2005, 2011, 2012, 2014, 2024
Supporters' Shield	4^{s}	1998, 2002, 2010, 2011
U.S. Open Cup	2	2001, 2005
Western Conference (Playoff)	8	1996, 1999, 2005, 2009, 2011, 2012, 2014, 2024
Western Conference (Regular Season)	8	1996, 1998, 1999, 2001, 2002, 2009, 2010, 2011
Continental
Competitions	Titles	Seasons
CONCACAF Champions Cup	1	2000

Notes

- record
- ^{s} shared record

=== Awards ===
- MLS Fair Play Award: 2013
- MLS Wooden Spoon: 2017

=== Retired numbers ===
The LA Galaxy have not officially retired any jersey number. Former LA Galaxy player, Cobi Jones, was incorrectly believed to have had his jersey No. 13 retired until it was again issued in 2017 to Jermaine Jones.

== Team results ==
This is a partial list of the last five seasons completed by the Galaxy. For the full season-by-season history, see List of LA Galaxy seasons.

Season	League											Position		Playoffs	USOC	Continental / Other		Average attendance	Top goalscorer(s)	
Season	Div	League	Pld	W	L	D	GF	GA	GD	Pts	PPG	Conf.	Overall	Playoffs	USOC	Continental / Other		Average attendance	Name(s)	Goals
2021	1	MLS	34	13	12	9	50	54	–4	48	1.41	8th	15th	DNQ	NH	Leagues Cup	DNQ	14,849	(Mexico) Javier Hernández	17
2022	1	MLS	34	14	12	8	58	51	+7	50	1.47	4th	8th	QF	QF	Leagues Cup	DNQ	22,841	(Mexico) Javier Hernández	18
2023	1	MLS	34	8	14	23	51	67	–16	36	1.06	13th	26th	DNQ	QF	Leagues Cup	GS	24,106	(United States) Tyler Boyd (Spain) Riqui Puig	7
2024	1	MLS	34	19	8	7	69	50	+19	64	1.88	2nd	4th	W	DNE	Leagues Cup	Ro32	26,136	(Serbia) Dejan Joveljić	19
2025	1	MLS	34	7	9	18	46	66	–20	30	0.88	14th	26th	DNQ	DNE	Leagues Cup CONCACAF Champions Cup	3rd QF	20,067	(Ghana) Joseph Paintsil	9

1. Avg. attendance include statistics from league matches only.
2. Top goalscorer(s) includes all goals scored in League, MLS Cup Playoffs, U.S. Open Cup, MLS is Back Tournament, CONCACAF Champions League, FIFA Club World Cup, and other competitive continental matches.

== Player awards ==
=== Statistical records ===
MLS regular season only, as of October 7, 2019

- Games: (United States) Cobi Jones, 392
- Goals: (United States) Landon Donovan, 113
- Assists: (United States) Landon Donovan, 107
- Clean sheets: (United States) Kevin Hartman, 64
- Goals in a season: (Sweden) Zlatan Ibrahimović, 30 (2019)

=== Top goalscorers ===
No.	Nation	Name	Career	MLS	Playoffs	Open Cup	Continental	Total (Apps)	Average
1	United States	Landon Donovan	2005–2014, 2016	113	15	6	7	141 (317)	0.44
2	Republic of Ireland	Robbie Keane	2011–2016	83	9	3	9	104 (165)	0.63
3	United States	Cobi Jones	1996–2007	70	6	4	2	82 (392)	0.21
4	Guatemala	Carlos Ruiz	2002–2004, 2008	51	11	6	1	69 (104)	0.66
5	Sweden	Zlatan Ibrahimović	2018–2019	52	1	0	0	53 (58)	0.91
6	United States	Edson Buddle	2007–2010, 2012, 2015	45	2	0	0	47 (144)	0.33
7	El Salvador	Mauricio Cienfuegos	1996–2003	35	7	2	1	45 (269)	0.17
8	Serbia	Dejan Joveljić	2021–2024	34	7	3	0	44 (122)	0.36
9	United States	Alan Gordon	2005–2010, 2014–2016	29	1	4	8	42 (203)	0.21
10	United States	Gyasi Zardes	2013–2017	34	2	3	1	40 (154)	0.26

=== Player of the Year ===
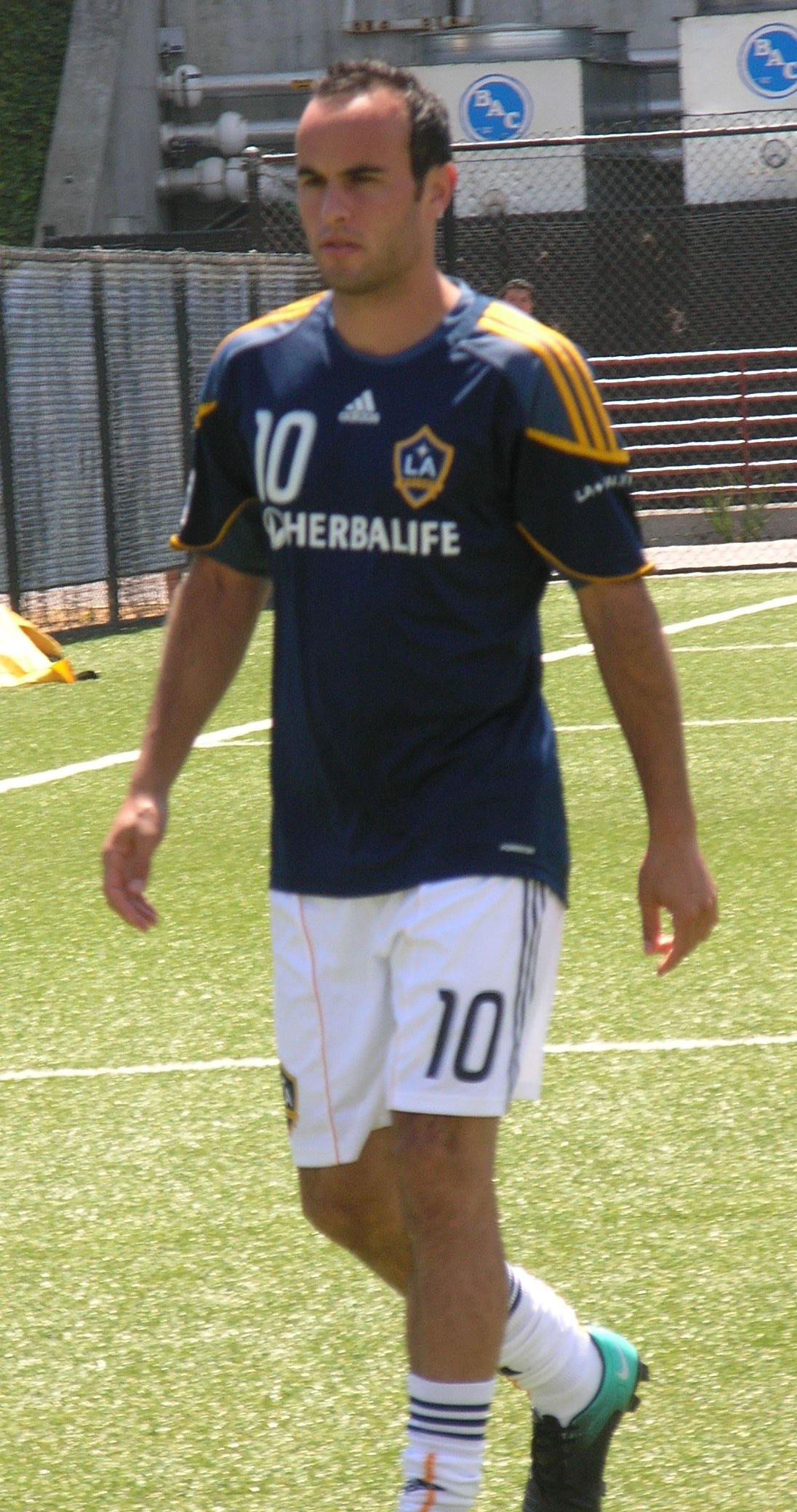
Landon Donovan is Galaxy's all-time top scorer and assist leader, and four-time MVP.

Year	Nation	Player
1996	Ecuador	Eduardo Hurtado
1997	El Salvador	Mauricio Cienfuegos
1998	United States	Cobi Jones
1999	United States	Kevin Hartman
2000	New Zealand	Simon Elliott
2001	Saint Vincent and the Grenadines	Ezra Hendrickson
2002	Guatemala	Carlos Ruiz
2003	United States	Kevin Hartman
2004	United States	Kevin Hartman
2005	United States	Herculez Gomez
2006	United States	Landon Donovan
2007	United States	Chris Klein
2008	United States	Landon Donovan
2009	United States	Landon Donovan
2010	United States	Edson Buddle
2011	United States	Landon Donovan
2012	Republic of Ireland	Robbie Keane
2013	Republic of Ireland	Robbie Keane
2014	Republic of Ireland	Robbie Keane
2015	Republic of Ireland	Robbie Keane
2016	Mexico	Giovani dos Santos
2017	France	Romain Alessandrini
2018	Sweden	Zlatan Ibrahimović
2019	Sweden	Zlatan Ibrahimović
2020	Argentina	Cristian Pavón
2021	Mexico	Javier Hernández
2022	Mexico	Javier Hernández
2023	Spain	Riqui Puig
2024	Spain	Riqui Puig

=== Golden Boot ===
The Golden Boot winner is the leading goal scorer at the end of the season (only goals in MLS count). This award did not exist from 1996 to 2004. The MLS Scoring Champion Award included both goal and assist totals those years.

Year	Nation	Player	Goals
2002	Guatemala	Carlos Ruiz	24
2005	United States	Landon Donovan	12
2006	United States	Landon Donovan	12
2007	United States	Landon Donovan	8
2008	United States	Landon Donovan	20
2009	United States	Landon Donovan	12
2010	United States	Edson Buddle	17
2011	United States	Landon Donovan	12
2012	Republic of Ireland	Robbie Keane	16
2013	Republic of Ireland	Robbie Keane	16
2014	Republic of Ireland	Robbie Keane	19
2015	Republic of Ireland	Robbie Keane	20
2016	Mexico	Giovani dos Santos	14
2017	France	Romain Alessandrini	13
2018	Sweden	Zlatan Ibrahimović	22
2019	Sweden	Zlatan Ibrahimović	30
2020	Argentina	Cristian Pavón	10
2021	Mexico	Javier Hernández	17
2022	Mexico	Javier Hernández	18
2023	United States; Spain	Tyler Boyd; Riqui Puig	7
2024	Brazil	Gabriel Pec	16

=== Defender of the Year ===
Year	Nation	Player
1996	Mexico	Jorge Campos
1997	United States	Robin Fraser
1998	United States	Robin Fraser
1999	United States	Robin Fraser
2000	United States	Danny Califf
2001	United States	Greg Vanney
2002	United States	Alexi Lalas
2003	United States	Danny Califf
2004	Jamaica	Tyrone Marshall
2005	Jamaica	Tyrone Marshall
2006	United States	Chris Albright
2007	United States	Ty Harden
2008	United States	Sean Franklin
2009	Jamaica	Donovan Ricketts
2010	United States	Omar Gonzalez
2011	United States	Omar Gonzalez
2012	Guam	A. J. DeLaGarza
2013	United States	Omar Gonzalez
2014	Guam	A. J. DeLaGarza
2015	Brazil	Leonardo
2016	Belgium	Jelle Van Damme
2017	England	Ashley Cole
2018	England	Ashley Cole
2019	Uruguay	Diego Polenta
2020	Mexico	Julián Araujo
2021	Mexico	Julián Araujo
2022	England	Jonathan Bond
2023	Brazil	Lucas Calegari
2024	Japan	Maya Yoshida
