= Freeway Face-Off =

National Hockey League rivalry

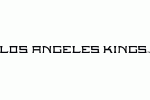
- Anaheim Ducks Los Angeles Kings
- First meeting: December 2, 1993
- Latest meeting: January 17, 2026
- Next meeting: November 27, 2026

Statistics
- Total meetings: 178
- All-time series: 85–61–11–21 (LAK)
- Regular season series: 81–58–11–21 (LAK)
- Postseason results: 4–3 (LAK)
- Largest victory: LAK 7–1 ANA; December 27, 1995
- Longest win streak: LAK W8
- Current win streak: ANA W2

Postseason history
- 2014 second round: Kings won, 4–3

The Freeway Face-Off is a National Hockey League (NHL) rivalry between the Anaheim Ducks and Los Angeles Kings. The series takes its name from the massive freeway system in the greater Los Angeles metropolitan area, the home of both teams; one could travel from one team's arena to the other simply by traveling along Interstate 5. The term is akin to the Freeway Series, which refers to meetings between the Los Angeles Angels and Los Angeles Dodgers of Major League Baseball (MLB).

== History ==
The Kings and Ducks are rivals due to geographic proximity. The two teams are situated in the same metropolitan area and share a television market. The rivalry started with the Ducks' inaugural season in 1993–94 and has since continued.

The Kings' first appearance in the Stanley Cup Final came in 1993. As of the end of the 2022–23 season, they have reached the Stanley Cup playoffs 32 times in franchise history (13 appearances since the Ducks joined the NHL), and won the Stanley Cup in 2012 and 2014. The Ducks have made the playoffs 14 times, reaching the Stanley Cup Final twice – in 2003 and winning in 2007. The Kings and the Ducks did not meet in the playoffs until the 2014 Stanley Cup playoffs.

Ducks fans have done the same for away games at the Kings' home ice, Crypto.com Arena. Games between the two teams are often very physical, typically including multiple fights and penalties. The rivalry was showcased for the NHL premiere at the O2 Arena in London at the start of the 2007–08 season with two games between the teams. The Ducks and Kings split both games 4–1 each. The Kings won the first game and the Ducks won the second game. It was also showcased as part of a 2014 NHL Stadium Series match at Dodger Stadium in Los Angeles, where Anaheim reigned victorious in a 3–0 shutout.

The rivalry was further heated during the 2010 NHL entry draft, which was hosted by the Kings at Staples Center (renamed Crypto.com Arena in 2021). When the Ducks took the stage to announce Cam Fowler as their first-round, 12th overall pick, the audience predominantly consisting of Kings fans, let out boos.

Prior to 2007, there was no official name for the regular season meetings between the Ducks and Kings. The "Freeway Face-off" name was chosen by a poll of 12,000 local ice hockey fans. Other names being considered were "Freeze-way Series" and "Ice-5 Series."

=== Notable moments ===
- In the 2007–08 season, the Ducks and Kings opened the season by playing a two-game series at O2 Arena in London, England, on September 29 and 30, 2007, respectively, with the former date marking the first-ever ice hockey game played at the arena. The opening faceoff was delayed as there was a lighting malfunction in the arena following the national anthems. Los Angeles won the first game by a score of 4–1 with help from then 19-year-old goaltender Jonathan Bernier and two goals from Michael Cammalleri. The Ducks split the series, however, after beating the Kings by a replica 4–1 scoreline in the second game. The second game was notable as Jonas Hiller made his NHL debut, as then-Ducks starting goaltender Jean-Sébastien Giguère was injured to begin the season.
- The Ducks and Kings met on March 26, 2008, at Honda Center in Anaheim for a late-season tilt. Although the Ducks and Kings were near opposites in the standings that year (the Ducks finished fifth in the West while the Kings finished 15th), both teams played to an exhausting effort, as goaltenders Jonas Hiller (Anaheim) and Erik Ersberg (Los Angeles) made game-stopping saves to help their team. The game was focused centrally on the goaltenders, as Hiller stopped 31 of 32 shots, while Ersberg 39 of 40. With the score tied 1–1 on goals from Patrick O'Sullivan (Los Angeles) and Bobby Ryan (Anaheim) through the third period, Kings forward Alexander Frolov stole the puck from a falling Mathieu Schneider at the former's blueline and skated full-speed on a breakaway with under 20 seconds remaining in regulation. Frolov faked a shot, but Hiller made a sprawling pad save, much to the applause of the 17,331 fans in attendance. The two teams then played through overtime scoreless, sending it to a shootout. Kings winger Dustin Brown scored first, but Ducks winger Teemu Selänne evened the shootout on the very next shot at 1–1. The next five shooters all missed their attempts until the Ducks' Schneider scored to put the Ducks ahead 2–1. Los Angeles forward Brian Willsie was stopped by Hiller on the next shot, giving the Ducks a 2–1 shootout victory. The win gave the Ducks a playoff spot at fourth in the West, clinching a playoff berth.
- On January 8, 2009, the Ducks and Kings met for a mid-season game at Staples Center in Los Angeles. The game featured an earthquake midway through the first period, felt by some of the players and also the press writers and fans in attendance. The game was not delayed, however. Los Angeles got off to a 2–0 lead late in the first period and throughout the second on goals from Dustin Brown and Wayne Simmonds. Then-Ducks head coach Randy Carlyle replaced goaltender Jean-Sébastien Giguère in favor of Jonas Hiller shortly thereafter, but the Kings scored again on an Anže Kopitar goal to make it 3–0. The game looked one-sided in favor of the Kings until Ducks winger Bobby Ryan scored a power play goal late in the second to put the Ducks on the board. To start the third, Ryan scored again, scoring a rebound off of a Ryan Carter wrist shot to cut the Kings' lead to one goal. The most notable moment of the game, however, came just about a minute later when Ducks center Ryan Getzlaf fed an open Ryan on the left wing for a scoring attempt. Ryan put on arguably one of the most dazzling moves of the season, as he skated in on an angle towards the net and put on a roller-hockey style spin move around Kings defenseman Peter Harrold. With Harrold frozen from the play, Ryan pulled the puck back on his stick and tucked it in the back of the net past a sprawling Jonathan Quick. Ryan's hat-trick set a Ducks franchise record for fastest hat-trick in team history at 2:21. The score was tied 3–3, giving the visiting Ducks momentum until Los Angeles re-gained the lead on a power play goal from Alexander Frolov. The Ducks made many last-ditch efforts to tie the game, but Jonathan Quick stonewalled the Ducks' attempts, giving the Kings a 4–3 victory over the Ducks.

== Recent developments ==
Due to the NHL's realignment (including the creation of the Canadian Division) and adoption of division-only play due to the COVID-19 pandemic, the Ducks and Kings played against each other eight times during the 2020–21 regular season. Both teams, along with their California rival, the San Jose Sharks were part of the West Division with the Colorado Avalanche, St. Louis Blues, and Minnesota Wild of the Central and the two other United States-based teams in the Pacific (Arizona Coyotes and Vegas Golden Knights).

=== Postseason history ===
As division rivals, the Ducks and Kings could theoretically meet in either the first or second round of the Stanley Cup playoffs. They could also meet in the conference finals, provided that either or both teams qualify for wild card spots. However, neither team can meet in the Stanley Cup Final. This differs from the similar Freeway Series between MLB's Los Angeles Angels and Los Angeles Dodgers, who are in separate conferences (the American League and National League, respectively) so they can only meet in the final round of the MLB postseason, the World Series; and the Chargers–Rams rivalry (Chargers and Rams are in the American Football Conference (AFC) and National Football Conference (NFC), respectively) so they can only meet in the final round of the NFL postseason, the Super Bowl.

The Ducks and the Kings met in the playoffs for the first time during the 2014 Stanley Cup playoffs. Anaheim held home ice advantage as a result of having the best regular season record in the Western Conference. The series began on May 3, 2014, at the Honda Center and ended on May 16 with the Kings winning the series in seven games, en route to winning the Stanley Cup.

== Fan reaction ==
The Kings were the first NHL team in Southern California, brought in by the 1967 NHL expansion. The Kings' success of the late 1980s and early 1990s, largely due to the arrival of Wayne Gretzky in 1988, helped spike interest in ice hockey in Los Angeles, also spawning the growth of inline hockey in the area. The Ducks, formerly known as the Mighty Ducks of Anaheim, came into the League for the 1993–94 season along with the Florida Panthers. With the Kings in existence for 26 years before the Ducks arrived, many saw the Ducks as taking away from the Kings' fanbase and attention in the local market. The Ducks' arrival in nearby Orange County brought new fans to the Southern California ice hockey scene, creating rivalry between the two teams and their fans.

The rivalry is also known for local bragging rights, pitting big-city Los Angeles against its southern neighbor Orange County, which is more suburban. Crypto.com Arena and Honda Center are less than an hour apart via local freeways; many Kings fans fill Honda Center in great numbers, but numerous Ducks fans also make the short trip up the freeway to Crypto.com Arena as well. In recent years, crowds at both venues are quite diverse due to both teams' recent successes.

== See also ==
- List of NHL rivalries
- El Tráfico
- Freeway Series
- Lakers–Clippers rivalry
- UCLA–USC rivalry
