= El Tráfico =

Soccer rivalry between the LA Galaxy and Los Angeles FC

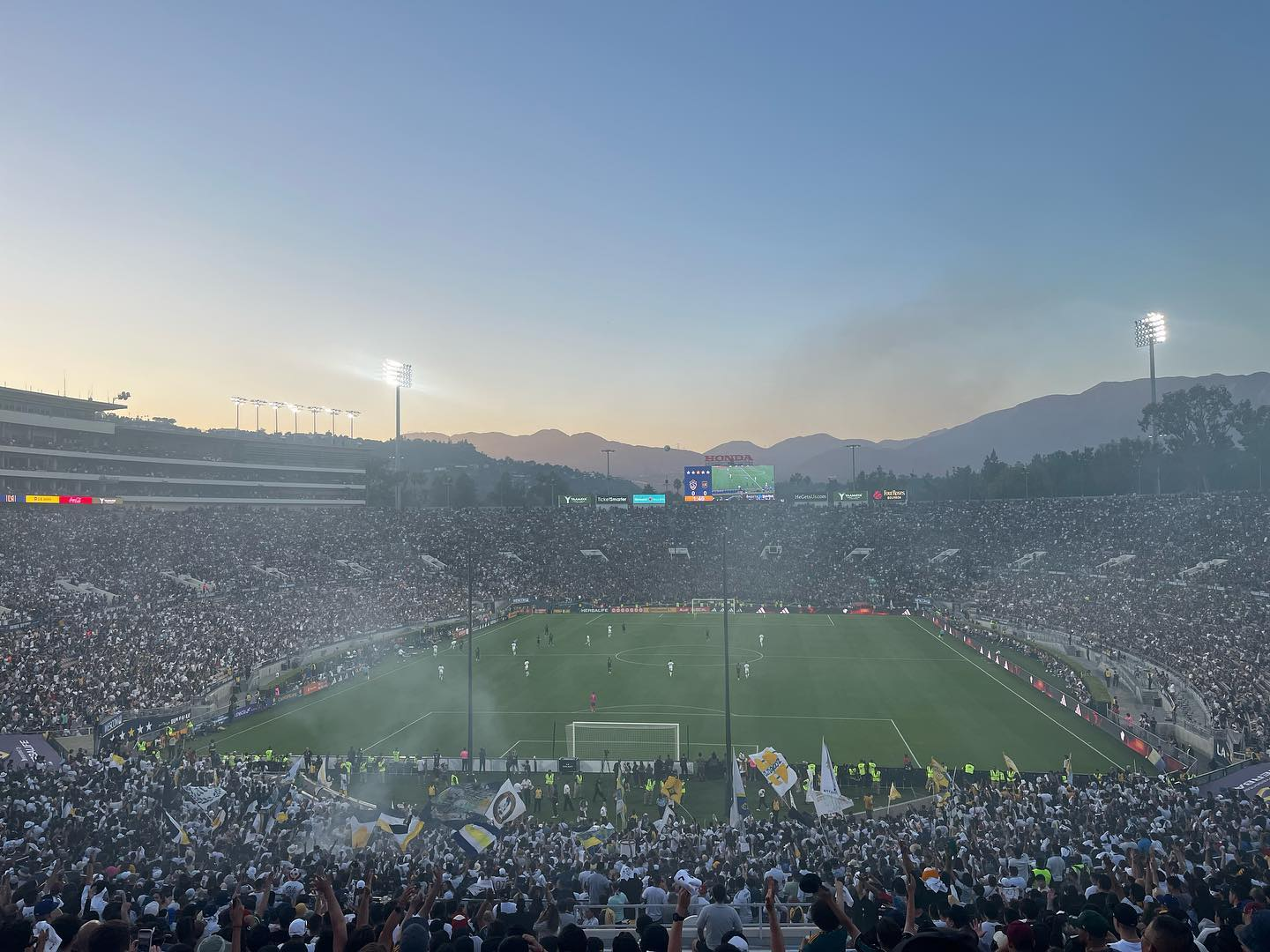
- An El Trafico match at the Rose Bowl on July 4, 2023.

- LA Galaxy Los Angeles FC
- Other names: Los Angeles Derby
- Location: Greater Los Angeles
- First meeting: March 31, 2018; MLS regular season LA Galaxy 4–3 LAFC
- Latest meeting: October 25, 2026; MLS regular season LAFC 2–2 LA Galaxy
- Next meeting: 2027

Statistics
- Total meetings: 28
- Most wins: Tie (10)
- Top scorer: Carlos Vela (12 goals)
- All-time series: LA Galaxy: 10; Drawn: 8 LAFC: 10
- Largest victory: LAFC 6–2 LA Galaxy; MLS is Back Tournament (July 18, 2020)
- Location of the two teams' stadiums in Los Angeles County

El Tráfico, also known as the Los Angeles Derby, is a soccer rivalry between the two Major League Soccer (MLS) clubs based in the Greater Los Angeles area, the LA Galaxy and Los Angeles FC. The rivalry is one of two crosstown derbies in MLS, alongside the Hudson River Derby in the New York City area. It replaced the SuperClasico between the LA Galaxy and defunct Chivas USA.

This rivalry has been characterized by dramatic goals, high scoring, and consistently close results, as well as mutual fan animosity. El Tráfico quickly became one of the most popular and contested rivalries in the league; in addition to regular season play, the Galaxy and LAFC have played each other in the MLS Cup playoffs and U.S. Open Cup.

== Background ==
Los Angeles FC was established in 2014, shortly after the dissolution of Chivas USA, an MLS franchise based in Los Angeles and owned by C.D. Guadalajara. Chivas shared the StubHub Center in the city of Carson, California, originally known as the Home Depot Center (2003–2013) and now known as Dignity Health Sports Park, with the Galaxy but had far lower attendances during its final years of operation. The two teams competed in the SuperClasico, named for the Mexican rivalry between Guadalajara and Club América. The two teams met 31 times in ten seasons, with the Galaxy winning 20 matches and Chivas winning four.

Los Angeles FC built Banc of California Stadium, now known as BMO Stadium, in Exposition Park in Los Angeles, California, approximately 13 miles (21 km) north of Carson, California, on Interstate 110.

== History ==
The first match between the two senior teams, LAFC's third-ever regular season game, was played on March 31, 2018, at the StubHub Center. Despite LAFC leading 3–0 after 60 minutes, the match ended in a 4–3 win for the Galaxy, including two goals from substitute Zlatan Ibrahimović on his club debut. The teams played at Banc of California Stadium on July 26 and was followed by a second match at the StubHub Center on August 24 during MLS Rivalry Week. The second meeting, on July 26, ended in a 2–2 draw at the Banc of California Stadium. Six fans were arrested in clashes between fans at the stadium, where seats were damaged and fights broke out. The final meeting of the two teams in 2018, played a month later on August 24, ended in a 1–1 draw at the StubHub Center.

The first El Tráfico match of the 2019 season, played in July at Dignity Health Sports Park (formerly the StubHub Center), ended in a 3–2 victory for the hosting LA Galaxy. Ibrahimović's scored all three Galaxy goals and earned a hat-trick, while Carlos Vela scored both of LAFC's goals. The visiting LAFC supporters came in a 17-bus convoy and wore camouflage outfits as part of a "united front", having been inspired by a similar display by German club Dynamo Dresden. The return fixture at Banc of California Stadium a month later ended in a 3–3 draw, with two goals apiece for Ibrahimović and Latif Blessing after a second-half comeback from LAFC.

The two teams met in the Western Conference Semifinals during the 2019 MLS Cup Playoffs, which was hosted by top-seeded LAFC after the Galaxy advanced from the first round against Minnesota United FC. LAFC won 5–3, breaking a six-match winless streak against the Galaxy, with pairs of goals scored by Vela and Adama Diomande. LAFC advanced to the Conference Final, where they lost 3–1 to Seattle Sounders FC, the eventual MLS Cup 2019 champions.

The opening El Tráfico fixture of the 2020 season was scheduled for May 16, but MLS suspended all operations in March due to the COVID-19 pandemic. The two teams were drawn into Group F of the MLS is Back Tournament, which would be played without spectators at the ESPN Wide World of Sports Complex in Florida. LAFC and the Galaxy met in the second matchday on July 18, 2020, with Vela opting out of the tournament and the Galaxy's Javier Hernández injured. LAFC won 6–2, setting a new record for largest margin of victory in El Tráfico, with four goals from Diego Rossi; both of the Galaxy's goals had come in the first 31 minutes, from an own goal and a penalty kick. On August 22, 2020, the Galaxy recorded the first El Tráfico away win with a 2–0 win and the first clean sheet at the Banc of California Stadium. On May 25, 2022, the Galaxy defeated LAFC 3–1 at Dignity Health Sports Park in the first ever US Open Cup El Tráfico with goals by Kévin Cabral, Javier Hernández, and Dejan Joveljic for the Galaxy and Ryan Hollingshead for LAFC. In their second playoff meeting at Banc of California Stadium on October 20, 2022, LAFC won 3–2.

The Galaxy planned to host their 2023 season opener on February 25 against LAFC at the Rose Bowl, the Galaxy's former stadium from 1996 to 2002. It was postponed to July 4 due to heavy wind and rain in the area brought by a major winter storm. The Rose Bowl match had 82,110 spectators, setting a new MLS record for standalone attendance, and was split between the two teams; the Galaxy won 2–1. A third match against designated rivals was added to the MLS schedule in 2023; LAFC expressed interest in potentially hosting the game at either the Coliseum or SoFi Stadium in 2024.

The 2024 match at the Rose Bowl resulted in a $100,000 fine for the Galaxy due to misconduct by their supporters, including the lighting of flares during play. For 2025, the games will return to the clubs' respective home stadiums due to the balanced schedule.

On December 7, 2024, John McCarthy became the first person to win the MLS Cup with both clubs, previously winning with Los Angeles FC in 2022.

== Fan activities ==
In January 2018, a mural commissioned by LAFC in Pico-Union was vandalized with the colors of the LA Galaxy within hours of being completed and unveiled. This followed an earlier incident where paint in LAFC's colors was sprayed over an LA Galaxy mural at Hawthorne Memorial Park and a Galaxy billboard. Both fanbases later defaced property during the inaugural year of the rivalry.

The clubs and fanbases have created a unique animosity between one another. For example, many LAFC fans refuse to use the name "LA Galaxy," instead opting for "Carson Galaxy" due to the fact that the Galaxy do not play in the city of Los Angeles but in Carson, California, a city in the county of Los Angeles. In addition, LAFC itself simply calls its rival "Galaxy" and often mocks their fans as "suburbanites". LA Galaxy fans frequently mock LAFC and its fans as "Chivas 2.0" as an allusion to the former Chivas USA, whose shutdown led to the creation of LAFC and which shared Los Angeles (and their home stadium) with the LA Galaxy from 2005 to 2014 and often mock their fans as "plastics" who only became fans of both the club and the league recently.

== Moniker ==
"El Tráfico" (literally "The Traffic" in Spanish) was a name created by MLS fans and adopted by media outlets following polls by SB Nation blogs LAG Confidential and Angels on Parade. It refers to the notorious traffic congestion in Los Angeles, among the worst in the United States and the world, while also serving as a pun on "El Clasico". MLS has no plans to trademark the name. The rivalry has also been called the "Los Angeles Derby", a moniker that was also used for the SuperClasico. The name "El Tráfico" has faced opposition from executives within LAFC, coach Bob Bradley, and the president of the 3252, LAFC's largest supporters group.

== Results ==
=== Summary ===
As of October 25, 2026

	Matches	LA wins	Draws	LAFC wins	LA goals	LAFC goals
MLS regular season	23	8	8	7	47	46
MLS Cup Playoffs	2	0	0	2	5	8
MLS is Back Tournament	1	0	0	1	2	6
U.S. Open Cup	2	2	0	0	5	1
Total	28	10	8	10	59	61

=== Matches ===
Season	Date	Competition	Stadium	Home team	Result	Away team	Attendance	Series	Ref
2018	March 31	MLS	StubHub Center	LA Galaxy	4–3	Los Angeles FC	27,068	LA 1–0–0	
2018	July 26	MLS	Banc of California Stadium	Los Angeles FC	2–2	LA Galaxy	22,716	LA 1–0–1	
2018	August 24	MLS	StubHub Center	LA Galaxy	1–1	Los Angeles FC	27,068	LA 1–0–2	
2019	July 19	MLS	Dignity Health Sports Park	LA Galaxy	3–2	Los Angeles FC	27,088	LA 2–0–2	
2019	August 25	MLS	Banc of California Stadium	Los Angeles FC	3–3	LA Galaxy	22,757	LA 2–0–3	
2019	October 24	MLS Cup Playoffs	Banc of California Stadium	Los Angeles FC	5–3	LA Galaxy	22,902	LA 2–1–3	
2020	July 18	MLS is Back‡	ESPN Sports Complex	Los Angeles FC	6–2	LA Galaxy	0†	Tied 2–2–3	
2020	August 22	MLS	Banc of California Stadium	Los Angeles FC	0–2	LA Galaxy	0†	LA 3–2–3	
2020	September 6	MLS	Dignity Health Sports Park	LA Galaxy	3–0	Los Angeles FC	0†	LA 4–2–3	
2020	October 25	MLS	Banc of California Stadium	Los Angeles FC	2–0	LA Galaxy	0†	LA 4–3–3	
2021	May 8	MLS	Dignity Health Sports Park	LA Galaxy	2–1	Los Angeles FC	7,193†	LA 5–3–3	
2021	August 28	MLS	Banc of California Stadium	Los Angeles FC	3–3	LA Galaxy	22,032	LA 5–3–4	
2021	October 3	MLS	Dignity Health Sports Park	LA Galaxy	1–1	Los Angeles FC	25,174	LA 5–3–5	
2022	April 9	MLS	Dignity Health Sports Park	LA Galaxy	2–1	Los Angeles FC	25,174	LA 6–3–5	
2022	May 25	U.S. Open Cup	Dignity Health Sports Park	LA Galaxy	3–1	Los Angeles FC	24,174	LA 7–3–5	
2022	July 8	MLS	Banc of California Stadium	Los Angeles FC	3–2	LA Galaxy	22,231	LA 7–4–5	
2022	October 20	MLS Cup Playoffs	Banc of California Stadium	Los Angeles FC	3–2	LA Galaxy	22,305	LA 7–5–5	
2023	April 16	MLS	Dignity Health Sports Park	LA Galaxy	2–3	Los Angeles FC	27,154	LA 7–6–5	
2023	May 23	U.S. Open Cup	BMO Stadium	Los Angeles FC	0–2	LA Galaxy	16,362	LA 8–6–5	
2023	July 4*	MLS	Rose Bowl	LA Galaxy	2–1	Los Angeles FC	82,110	LA 9–6–5	
2023	September 16	MLS	BMO Stadium	Los Angeles FC	4–2	LA Galaxy	22,132	LA 9–7–5	
2024	April 6	MLS	BMO Stadium	Los Angeles FC	2–1	LA Galaxy	22,321	LA 9–8–5	
2024	July 4	MLS	Rose Bowl	LA Galaxy	1–2	Los Angeles FC	70,076	Tied 9–9–5	
2024	September 14	MLS	Dignity Health Sports Park	LA Galaxy	4–2	Los Angeles FC	25,174	LA 10–9–5	
2025	May 18	MLS	Dignity Health Sports Park	LA Galaxy	2–2	Los Angeles FC	23,083	LA 10–9–6	
2025	July 19	MLS	BMO Stadium	Los Angeles FC	3–3	LA Galaxy	22,301	LA 10–9–7	
2026	July 17	MLS	Dignity Health Sports Park	LA Galaxy	0–3	Los Angeles FC	24,325	Tied 10–10–7	
2026	October 25	MLS	BMO Stadium	Los Angeles FC	2–2	LA Galaxy	22,323	Tied 10–10–8	

† Matches played behind closed doors or reduced capacity due to the COVID-19 pandemic.

‡ Although the match was part of the MLS is Back Tournament, group stage matches count toward regular season MLS statistics.

* Originally scheduled for February 25, 2023, but rescheduled to July 4 due to inclement weather.

=== Western Conference standings finishes ===
Teams above red line qualified for the MLS Cup playoffs.
LA Galaxy LAFC

P.	2018	2019	2020	2021	2022	2023	2024	2025	2026
1		1			1		1		
2							2		
3	3					3		3	
4					4				
5		5							
6									6
7	7		7						
8				8					
9				9					
10			10						
11									11
12									
13						13			
14								14	
15									

• Total: LAFC with 8 higher finishes, LA Galaxy with 1.

== Top goalscorers ==
As of October 25, 2026

Rank	Nation	Player	Team	Goals
1	GAB	Denis Bouanga	Los Angeles FC	12
1	MEX	Carlos Vela	Los Angeles FC	12
3	SWE	Zlatan Ibrahimović	LA Galaxy	9
4	SRB	Dejan Joveljić	LA Galaxy	6
4	URU	Diego Rossi	Los Angeles FC	6
6	COL	Cristian Arango	Los Angeles FC	4
6	USA	Sebastian Lletget	LA Galaxy	4
6	ARG	Cristian Pavón	LA Galaxy	4
9	USA	Tyler Boyd	LA Galaxy	3
9	FRA	Samuel Grandsir	LA Galaxy	3
9	MEX	Javier Hernández	LA Galaxy	3
9	USA	Ryan Hollingshead	Los Angeles FC	3
9	ESP	Riqui Puig	LA Galaxy	3

== Players who have played for both clubs ==
LAFC, then LA Galaxy

- (Canada) Raheem Edwards
- (Finland) Niko Hämäläinen
- (United States) John McCarthy
- (United States) Christian Ramirez

LA Galaxy, then LAFC

- (United States) Tyler Boyd
- (United States) Mark Delgado
- (United States) Adam Saldana

== Other significant sports rivalries within the Greater Los Angeles area ==
- Major League Baseball: Freeway Series
- National Hockey League: Freeway Face-Off
- National Basketball Association: Lakers–Clippers rivalry
- College football: UCLA–USC rivalry
- College soccer: UCLA–UCSB rivalry

== See also ==
- MLS rivalry cups

Crosstown rivalries in Los Angeles

- Freeway Series (Major League Baseball)
- Freeway Face-Off (National Hockey League)
- Lakers–Clippers rivalry (National Basketball Association)
- UCLA–USC rivalry (college football)
- SuperClasico (former MLS crosstown rivalry between the LA Galaxy and Chivas USA)
