= Freeway Series =

Major League Baseball rivalry

- Los Angeles Angels Los Angeles Dodgers
- Location: Greater Los Angeles
- First meeting: June 17, 1997; Dodger Stadium, Los Angeles; Dodgers 4, Angels 3
- Latest meeting: June 7, 2026; Dodger Stadium, Los Angeles; Dodgers 5, Angels 13
- Next meeting: May 28, 2027; Angel Stadium, Anaheim
- Stadiums: Angels: Angel Stadium; Dodgers: Dodger Stadium

Statistics
- Total meetings: 160
- Most wins: Angels
- Regular season series: Angels, 82–78 (.513)
- Largest victory: Angels, 13–0 (June 25, 2004); Dodgers, 16–3 (May 19, 2006); 15–2 (May 16, 2026)
- Longest win streak: Angels, 7 (September 4, 2024–August 13, 2025); Dodgers, 10 (August 7, 2021–July 8, 2023)
- Current win streak: Angels, 1

Locations of the Los Angeles Angels and Los Angeles Dodgers

The Freeway Series (also known as the Angels–Dodgers rivalry) is a Major League Baseball (MLB) interleague rivalry played between the Los Angeles Angels and the Los Angeles Dodgers. The Angels are members of the American League (AL) West division, and the Dodgers are members of the National League (NL) West division. The series takes its name from the massive freeway system in the greater Los Angeles metropolitan area, the home of both teams; one could travel from one team's stadium to the other simply by driving along the Santa Ana Freeway (Interstate 5). The term is akin to Subway Series which refers to meetings between New York City baseball teams The Yankees and The Mets. The term "Freeway Series" also inspired the official name of the region's NHL rivalry between the Los Angeles Kings and the Anaheim Ducks: the Freeway Face-Off.

== Background ==
The rise of Southern California as a major region of the United States brought about a significant economic rivalry between neighboring Los Angeles and Orange counties.

To many living outside of Southern California, the entire region is often simply referred to as "LA", associating Los Angeles and Orange counties with the same stereotypes and preconceptions. However, the two counties differ sharply in political ideology, socioeconomic status, and demographics.

Los Angeles County is considered more liberal, and is represented by a more ethnically diverse population, while Orange County was known to be one of the most conservative areas in the state. This divide led to the Los Angeles/Orange county line being colloquially referred to as the Orange Curtain.

This can be somewhat misleading, though, because the older, more urban, cities of northern and central Orange County (Anaheim, Santa Ana, Garden Grove, Buena Park, etc.) are much more in tune with Los Angeles County cities than their southern Orange County counterparts. These older Orange County cities are much less homogeneous than the south, and the income levels and demographics represent this.

In recent years, coinciding with the postseason success of the Dodgers and the growing postseason drought for the Angels, gameday experiences for each team have drastically changed (with a Dodgers game costing much more money to attend than an Angels game) because of this the economic situations of each fanbase have experienced a sort of role reversal. Another contributing factor of the changing fanbases of both franchises is the ownership of the Angels by Arte Moreno (the first Mexican-American to own a major sports team in the United States) which has led to a significant growth of its Hispanic and Latino American fanbase. This has even become a contributing factor toward players such as Anthony Rendon choosing to sign with the Angels over that of the Dodgers. Following the addition of Shohei Ohtani to the Angels in 2018 and the Dodgers in 2023, both teams saw an increase in both Asian and Asian American fans, particularly Japanese and Japanese American fans.

== History ==
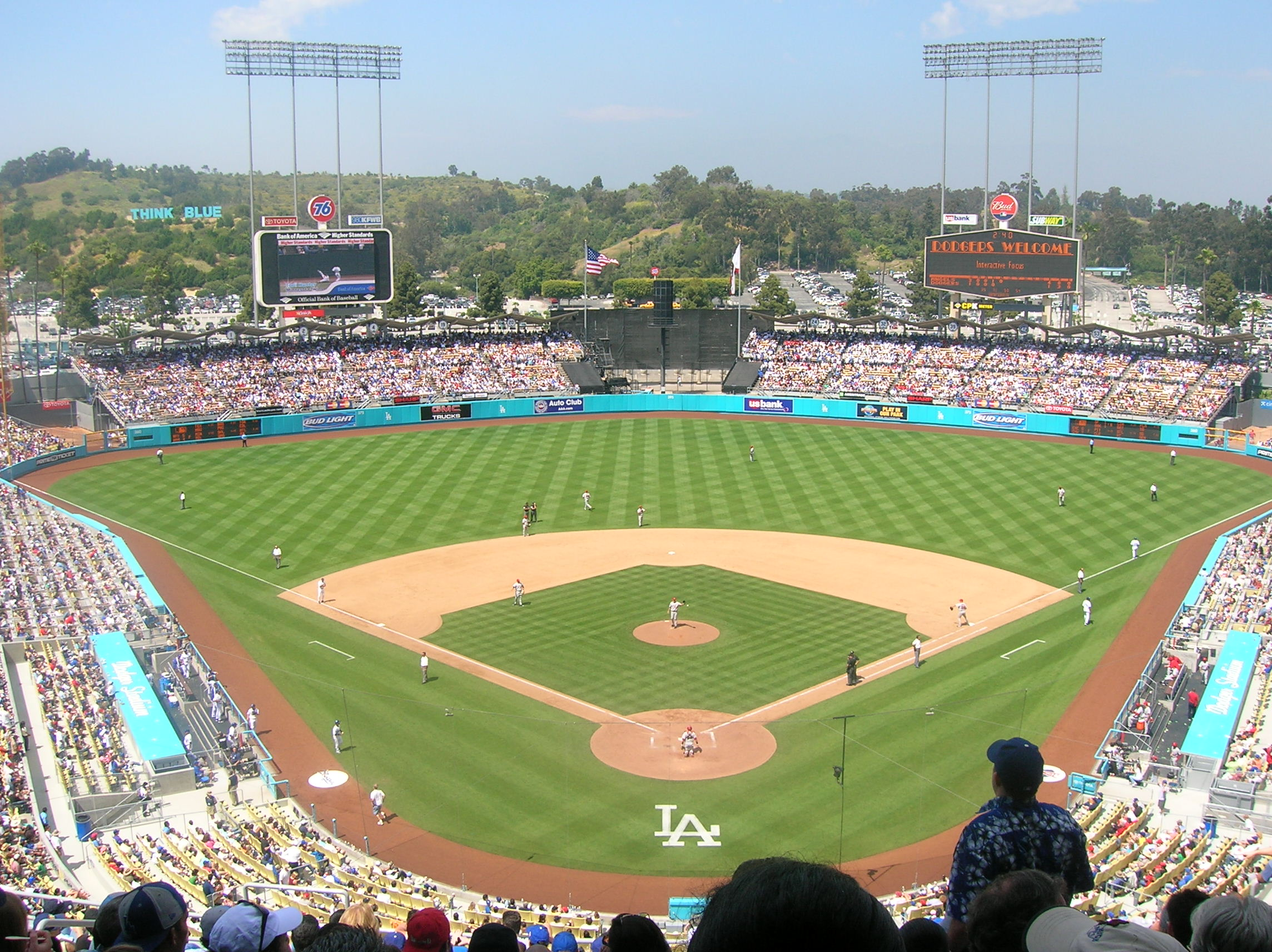
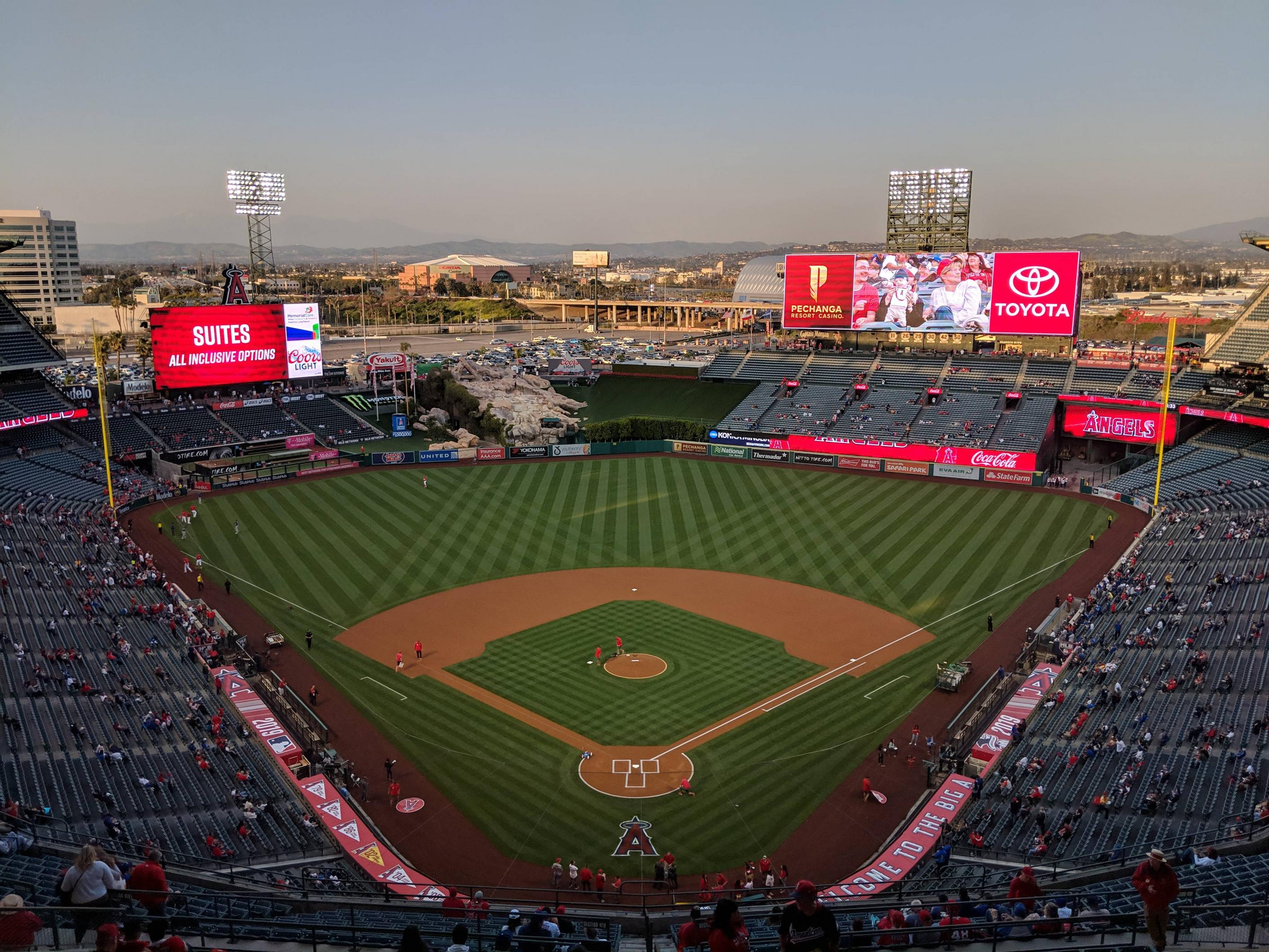
Dodger Stadium (left), the home of the Los Angeles Dodgers, and Angel Stadium (right), home of the Los Angeles Angels.

The Freeway Series began as a pre-season exhibition series regularly played between the Los Angeles Angels and Los Angeles Dodgers at their respective regular season ballparks during the final days of each pre-season. The first exhibition game between the two clubs took place on April 2, 1962, which saw the Angels beat the Dodgers 6–5 in Palm Springs, at the time the spring training home of the Angels. The first pre-season series was played at Dodger Stadium, at the time the home ballpark of both teams April 6–7, 1963. The Angels won both of the two games played. The Dodgers and Angels continued playing spring training exhibition games against one another in 1964. On the eve of the Angels' 1966 move to Anaheim Stadium, the series paused for the 1965 pre-season and did not resume until the 1969 pre-season. The exhibition Freeway Series has mostly persisted since its 1969, with only occasional skipped years in 1972, 1980 and 2000-02 pre-seasons, the latter of which was the result of bad blood that developed between the teams' front offices following the Dodgers' late cancellation of the 2000 pre-season Freeway Series to play the New York Yankees, which left the Angels to scramble to find a last minute replacement club to play. While the novelty and transition of the exhibition Freeway Series lost much of its luster following MLB's adoption of regular season interleague play, the exhibition Freeway Series continues to this day. Generally, the exhibition Freeway Series is two or three games, with at least one game played at each of Dodger Stadium and Angel Stadium between the end of the Cactus League and Opening Day, and is extremely well attended for preseason games (for example, the average attendance for the 2023 preseason Freeway Series was 36,108.

In anticipation of the Angels moving to Anaheim for the 1966 season, the Angels renamed as the "California Angels". They would keep this name from late-1965 to 1996 and rename as the "Anaheim Angels" from 1997 to 2004. After the Angels added Los Angeles to their official name in 2005 (as the "Los Angeles Angels of Anaheim"), the rivalry took on renewed interest, as the series took on a more intracity atmosphere. Throughout the 2005 season, Dodger Stadium listed the Angels as "ANA" on its out-of-town scoreboard and team schedules, as it was prior to Angels' name change. However, the Dodgers now post "LAA" on both their scoreboard and schedules. Dodger broadcaster Vin Scully referred to the team as just the Angels when mentioning them on the air. Dodgers tickets would initially refer to the Angels as the "Anaheim Angels." As of the 2011 season, however, the Angels' out-of-town scoreboard in right field still lists the Dodgers by their pre-2005 "LA" abbreviation instead of "LAD". The Angels' name change was largely opposed by the Dodgers organization, city and county of Los Angeles, Anaheim, every other city in Orange County, and fans on both sides. The prevailing argument was that the Angels did not play within Los Angeles county limits, and that adding LA to the name inaccurately represented the location and background of the team's fans. The Angels' ownership countered that bringing the Los Angeles name to the American League was beneficial to the entire region and organization. Furthermore, the Census Bureau's definition of Greater Los Angeles includes Orange County in its definition, and the Angels have always used Los Angeles stations to broadcast their TV and radio games. The adding of the "Los Angeles" to the Angels name still causes some resentment in the minds of both Angel and Dodger fans today.

Regular and postseason games between the two teams take place at either Angel Stadium or Dodger Stadium. The two stadiums are located approximately 30 miles (48 km) apart, and take approximately 40–50 minutes to travel via Metrolink or Amtrak from their closest stations, Los Angeles Union Station and the Anaheim Station.

At one point, both teams were owned by major media conglomerates: the Angels had been owned by the Walt Disney Company, and the Dodgers were owned by News Corporation (each company owned one of the MLB broadcast partners, with News Corporation changing its name to 21st Century Fox in 2013, and subsequently being purchased by the Walt Disney Company in 2019). Both teams were only owned by these corporations for a short period of time (1996-2003 for Disney and the Angels, 1998-2004 for Fox and the Dodgers).

During the 2002 World Series, there was a moment of peace in the rivalry as a result of the nightmares the Dodgers and their fans were facing because the Angels played the San Francisco Giants, the fierce in-state rivals of the Dodgers. The Los Angeles Times called the series "the Dodgers' 'Nightmare Series.'" The New York Post called it "the worst-scenario World Series for the Dodgers." The San Francisco Chronicle called the series "a Dodger fan's worst nightmare." The Dodgers and their fans, including Chairman Bob Daly and former manager Tommy Lasorda, rooted for the eventual champions and attended their games in Anaheim. Lasorda was at Game 2 and stood behind the batting cage and said that he's a big fan of Angels manager Mike Scioscia (Scioscia had spent his entire 13 year playing career with the Dodgers). Daly attended Game 7 and sat near the Angels dugout, as a fan of late Angels owner Gene Autry. This series was the Angels first, and to date, only championship. Of note, the Dodgers have played who is considered the Angels biggest rival, the Oakland Athletics, in the 1974 and 1988 World Series.

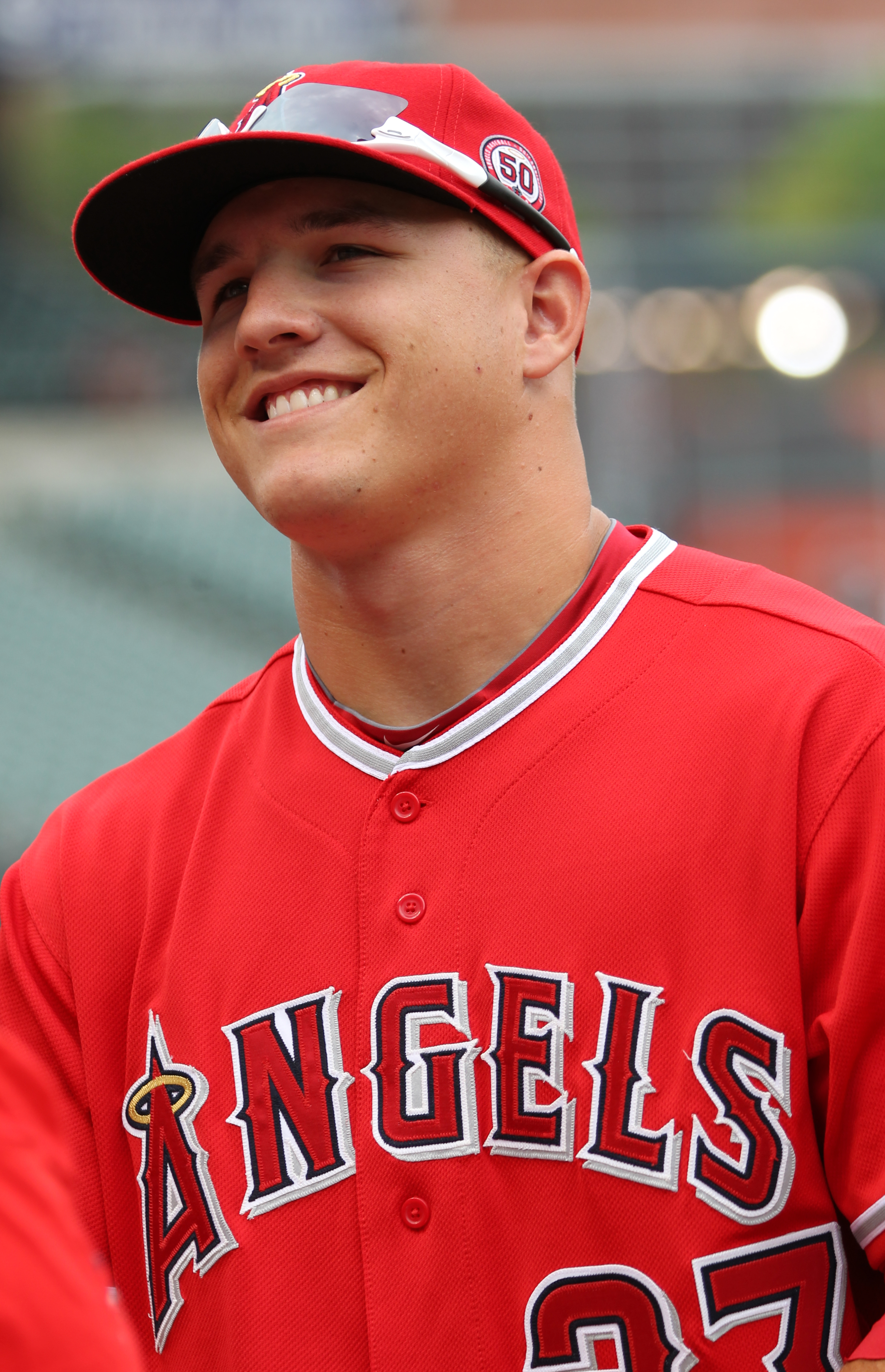
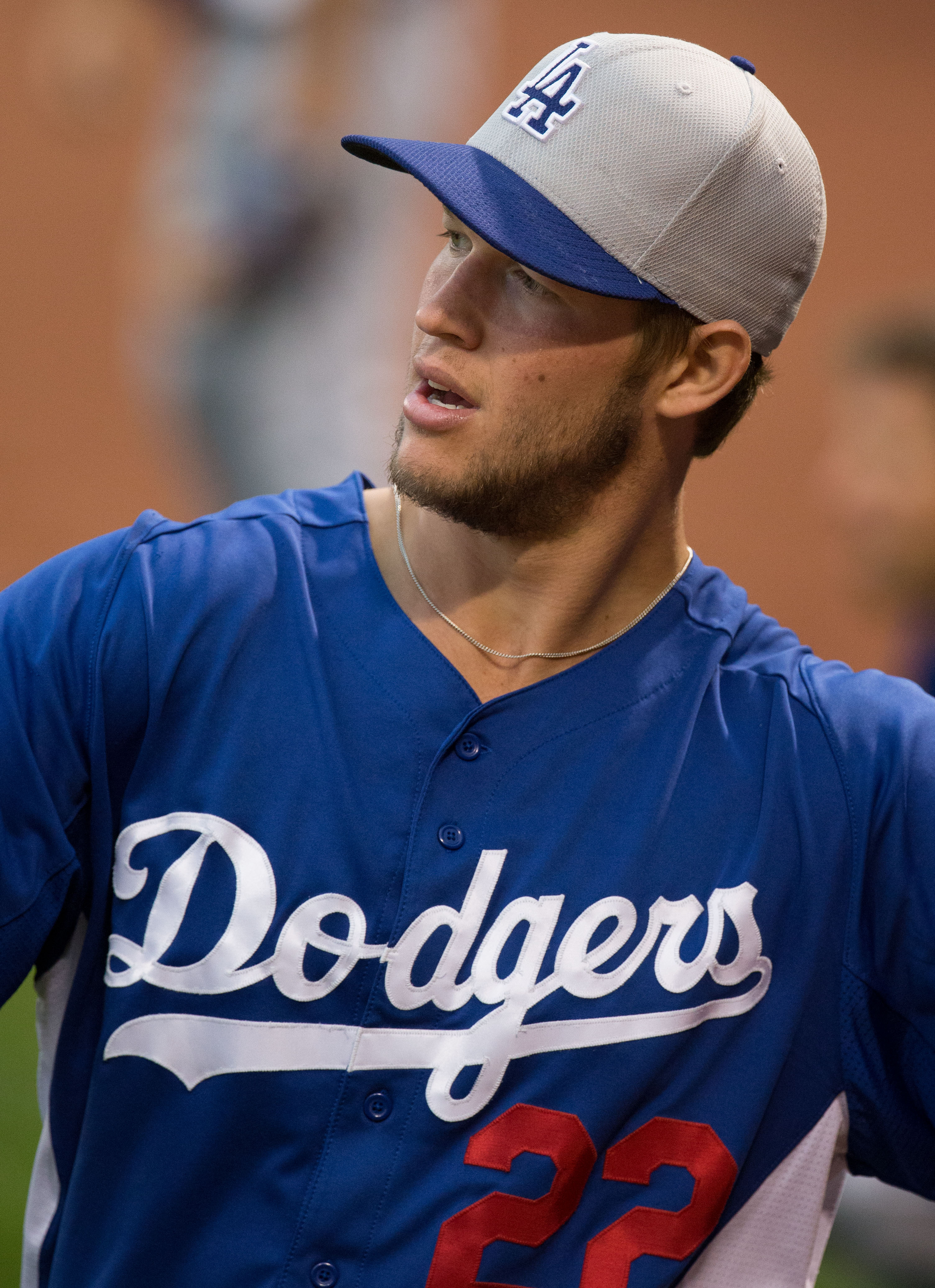
The Angels' Mike Trout and the Dodgers' Clayton Kershaw both won the MVP awards for their respective leagues in 2014.

History was made in 2014 when two MVPs were chosen from the same metropolitan area with the Angels outfielder Mike Trout winning the American League MVP and Dodger pitcher Clayton Kershaw winning National League MVP for the year. This occurred again in 2019 when the Angels' Trout and Dodgers' Cody Bellinger won their league's respective MVP awards.

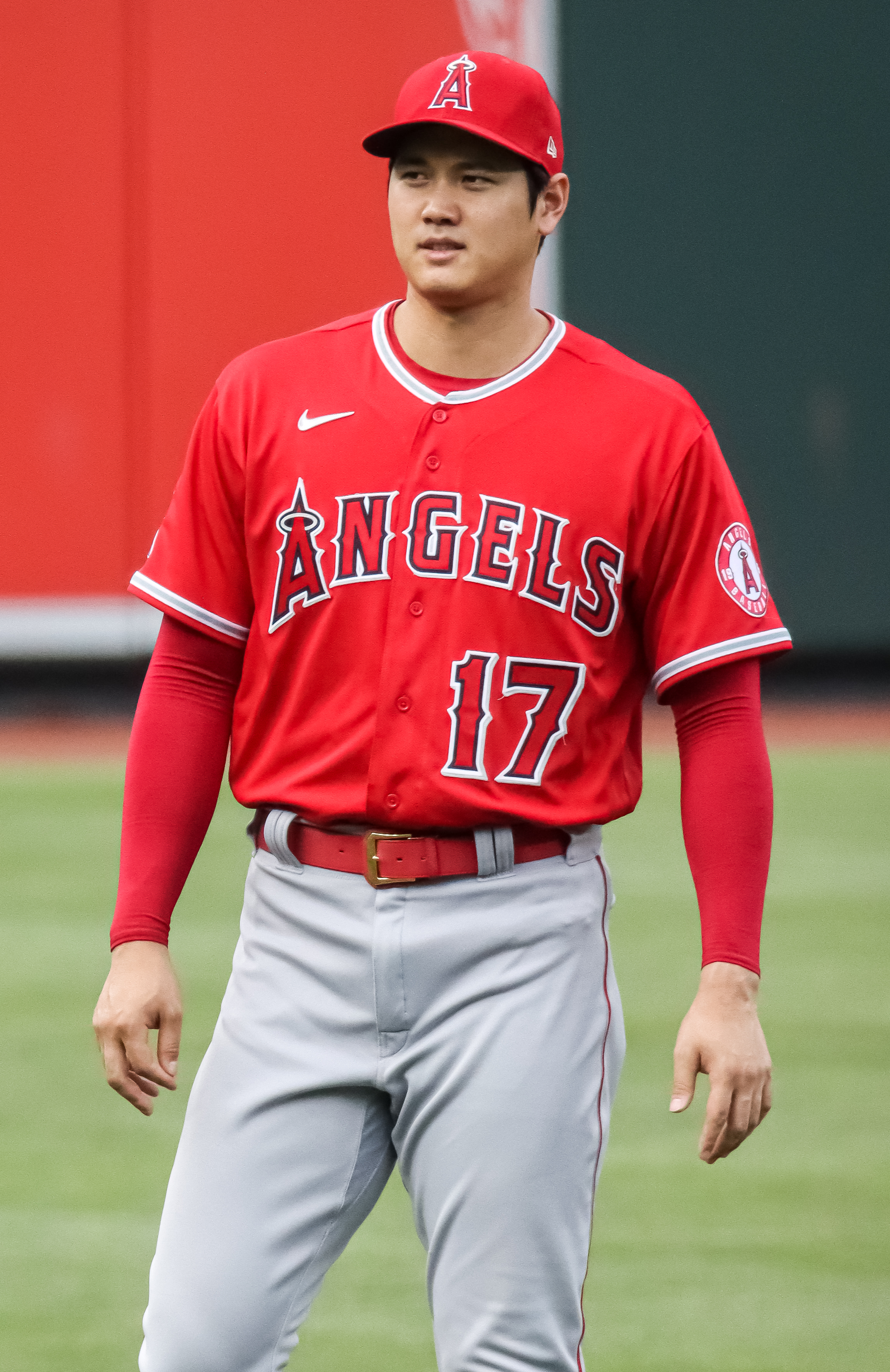
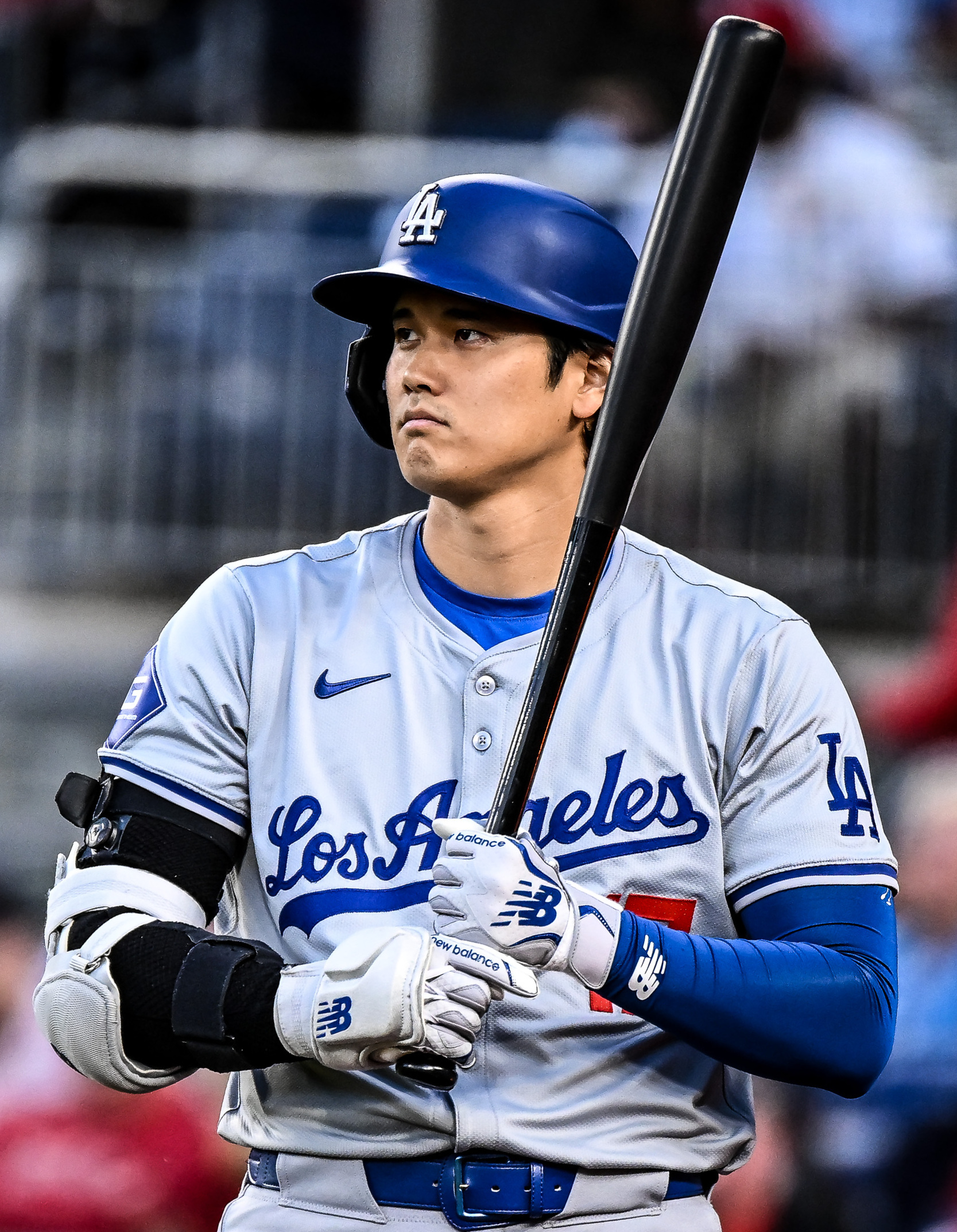
Shohei Ohtani spent his first 6 seasons with the Angels before signing a 10-year, $700 million contract with the Dodgers in 2023. $680 million of the contract was deferred.

Since the dawn of free-agency in the mid 1970s, both franchises have fought over star players on the open market, including Reggie Jackson, Vladimir Guerrero, Zack Greinke, Anthony Rendon, among others. A recent point of contention between the two fanbases occurred on December 9, 2023, when Angels’ star Shohei Ohtani signed with the Dodgers for $700 million. Ohtani's decision to leave the Angels to sign with the Dodgers led to some Angels fans dubbing him a "traitor" and "sell-out". Following the firing of Ippei Mizuhara in 2024 due to his theft of $4.5 million from Ohtani for sports betting, animosity towards Ohtani's departure from Angels fans only grew. The first regular season meetings between the two teams since the signing took place on June 21, 2024 at Dodger Stadium and on September 3, 2024 at Angel Stadium. Ohtani would have immiedate success with the Dodgers, winning two Most Valuable Player awards and consecutive World Series in his first two seasons.

In 2025, the Angels swept the season-series from the Dodgers, 6-0, for just the second time since the two teams began playing each other in the regular season in 1997.

== Club success ==
Team	World Series Titles	League pennants	Division titles	Wild Card Berths	Playoff Appearances	All-time Regular Season record	Win percentage	Seasons played
Los Angeles Angels	1	1	9	1	10	5,155–5,305–3	.493	66
Los Angeles Dodgers	8	14	24	3	30	5,901–4,857–6	.548	69
Combined	9	15	33	4	40	11,056–10,162–9	.521	69 in LA 134 total

Note: Dodgers records only from 1958 when they moved to Los Angeles.
As of the 2026 season.

=== Results ===
LAA vs. LAD	Angels wins	Dodgers wins	Angels runs	Dodgers runs
Regular season	82	78	677	696

Updated to most recent meeting, June 7, 2026.

== Season-by-season results ==
Los Angeles Angels vs. Los Angeles Dodgers Season-by-Season Results
1990s (Dodgers, 9–5)

Season	Season series		at Anaheim Angels	at Los Angeles Dodgers	Overall series	Notes
1997	Dodgers	4‍–‍0	Dodgers, 2‍–‍0	Dodgers, 2‍–‍0	Dodgers; 4‍–‍0	Interleague play was introduced in the 1997 season, marking the first time the Angels and Dodgers played each other in the regular season. As a result of City of Anaheim v. Angels Baseball LP, Angels change name from "California Angels" to "Anaheim Angels". First time Dodgers sweep the Angels.
1998	Angels	3–1	Angels, 2–0	Tie, 1–1	Dodgers; 5–3	
1999	Dodgers	4‍–‍2	Dodgers, 2‍–‍1	Dodgers, 2‍–‍1	Dodgers; 9‍–‍5	First year of 6-game home-and-away format. Starting with their loss to the Dodgers on July 16, Angels go on a 11-game losing streak.

2000s (Angels, 36–24)

Season	Season series		at Anaheim Angels/Los Angeles Angels of Anaheim	at Los Angeles Dodgers	Overall series	Notes
2000	Angels	4‍–‍2	Angels, 2‍–‍1	Angels, 2‍–‍1	Dodgers 11–9	
2001	Angels	4‍–‍2	Angels, 2‍–‍1	Angels, 2‍–‍1	Tie; 13‍–‍13	
2002	Tie	3‍–‍3	Angels, 2‍–‍1	Dodgers, 2‍–‍1	Tie; 16‍–‍16	Angels advance to the American League postseason as the Wild Card and win American League pennant. Angels win 2002 World Series, their first World Series championship in franchise history.
2003	Angels	4‍–‍2	Angels, 3‍–‍0	Dodgers, 2‍–‍1	Angels; 20‍–‍18	Angels take series lead, which continues to this day
2004	Tie	3‍–‍3	Dodgers, 2‍–‍1	Angels, 2‍–‍1	Angels; 23‍–‍21	Angels win 6 games in a row against the Dodgers, this had previously been their longest winning streak against them. On June 25 at Dodger Stadium, Angels defeat the Dodgers 13-0, their most runs scored in a game against the Dodgers and their largest victory against the Dodgers with a 13-run differential. Both teams make the postseason for the first time.
2005	Angels	5‍–‍1	Angels, 3‍–‍0	Angels, 2‍–‍1	Angels; 28‍–‍22	Angels rename to "Los Angeles Angels of Anaheim" (see City of Anaheim v. Angels Baseball LP for more information.); Angels win American League West Division title and finish as runner-up in their respective league championship series.
2006	Dodgers	4‍–‍2	Angels, 2–1	Dodgers, 3‍–‍0	Angels; 30‍–‍26	On May 19 at Dodgers Stadium, Dodgers defeat the Angels 16–3, their most runs scored in a game against the Angels and their largest victory against the Angels with a 13-run differential. Dodgers advance to the National League postseason as the Wild Card, Angels finished second in the American League West Division standings.
2007	Angels	5‍–‍1	Angels, 3‍–‍0	Angels, 2‍–‍1	Angels; 35‍–‍27	Angels win their first of three consecutive American League West Division titles.
2008	Tie	3‍–‍3	Angels, 2‍–‍1	Dodgers, 2‍–‍1	Angels; 38‍–‍30	Angels finish with the best record in the league (100-62). Both teams win their respective divisions. Dodgers finish as runner-up in their National league championship series.
2009	Tie	3‍–‍3	Dodgers, 2‍–‍1	Angels, 2‍–‍1	Angels; 41‍–‍33	Both teams win their respective divisions and finish as runners-ups in their respective league championship series.

2010s (Angels, 29–21)

Season	Season series		at Los Angeles Angels of Anaheim/Los Angeles Angels	at Los Angeles Dodgers	Overall series	Notes
2010	Angels	5‍–‍1	Angels, 2‍–‍1	Angels, 3‍–‍0	Angels; 46‍–‍34	First Angels sweep at Dodger Stadium.
2011	Angels	4‍–‍2	Angels, 2‍–‍1	Angels, 2‍–‍1	Angels; 50‍–‍36	
2012	Angels	4‍–‍2	Angels, 2‍–‍1	Angels, 2‍–‍1	Angels; 54‍–‍38	
2013	Tie	2‍–‍2	Angels, 2–0	Dodgers, 2–0	Angels; 56–40	Series changed to four-game format with two in each city, except in years the AL West plays the NL West (2015, 2018, 2020, 2021); Dodgers win their first of eight consecutive National League West Division titles (current). Dodgers finish as runner-up in their National league championship series.
2014	Dodgers	3‍–‍1	Dodgers, 2‍–‍0	Tie, 1‍–‍1	Angels; 57‍–‍43	Angels finish with the best record in the league (98-64). Both teams win their respective divisions.
2015	Dodgers	5‍–‍1	Dodgers, 2‍–‍1	Dodgers, 3‍–‍0	Angels; 58‍–‍48	Dodgers win 7 games in a row against the Angels. Dodgers win National League West Division.
2016	Angels	3‍–‍1	Angels, 2‍–‍0	Tie, 1‍–‍1	Angels; 61‍–‍49	Angels name reverts to "Los Angeles Angels"; Dodgers win National League West Division and finish as runner-up in their National league championship series.
2017	Tie	2‍–‍2	Tie, 1‍–‍1	Tie, 1‍–‍1	Angels; 63‍–‍51	On June 26, Angels' win against the Dodgers snapped the Dodgers' 10-game winning streak. Dodgers finish with the best record in the league (104–58). Dodgers win National League West Division and lose 2017 World Series.
2018	Tie	3‍–‍3	Angels, 2‍–‍1	Dodgers, 2‍–‍1	Angels; 66‍–‍54	Dodgers win National League West Division and lose 2018 World Series.
2019	Angels	4‍–‍0	Angels, 2‍–‍0	Angels, 2‍–‍0	Angels; 70‍–‍54	First season series sweep by the Angels and first by either team since 1997, the first year with interleague play. Dodgers win National League West Division.

2020s (Dodgers, 24‍–‍12)

Season	Season series		at Los Angeles Angels	at Los Angeles Dodgers	Overall series	Notes
2020	Dodgers	6‍–‍0	Dodgers, 3‍–‍0	Dodgers, 3‍–‍0	Angels; 70‍–‍60	Season shortened to 60 games due to COVID-19 pandemic. Second season series sweep by the Dodgers, and first in a six-game format. Dodgers finish with the best record in the league (43–17); Dodgers win National League West Division, National league pennant, and 2020 World Series, their first World Series championship since the 1988 season.
2021	Tie	3‍–‍3	Angels, 2‍–‍1	Dodgers, 2‍–‍1	Angels; 73‍–‍63	Albert Pujols signs with the Dodgers after being released by the Angels on May 17.
2022	Dodgers	4‍–‍0	Dodgers, 2‍–‍0	Dodgers, 2‍–‍0	Angels; 73‍–‍67	Third season series sweep by the Dodgers. Dodgers finish with the best record in the league (111–51).
2023	Dodgers	4‍–‍0	Dodgers, 2‍–‍0	Dodgers, 2‍–‍0	Angels; 73‍–‍71	All MLB teams start playing each other annually. Four-game format (two games at each ballpark) used for interleague rivals. Fourth season series sweep by the Dodgers. Dodgers finish the longest win streak of the series, a 10-game winning streak.
2024	Tie	2‍–‍2	Tie, 1‍–‍1	Tie, 1‍–‍1	Angels; 75‍–‍73	Shohei Ohtani signs with the Dodgers after six seasons with the Angels. Dodgers win National League West Division, National League pennant, and 2024 World Series
2025	Angels	6‍–‍0	Angels, 3‍–‍0	Angels, 3‍–‍0	Angels; 81‍–‍73	Return of six-game format with each team hosting a three-game series. Kenley Jansen, the Dodgers all-time saves leader, signs with the Angels. The Angels’ second season series sweep of the Dodgers, and first in a six-game format. Angels win 7 games in a row against the Dodgers, their longest winning streak against them. Dodgers win National League West Division, National League pennant, and 2025 World Series
2026	Dodgers	5‍–‍1	Dodgers, 3‍–‍0	Dodgers, 2‍–‍1	Angels; 82‍–‍78	

Summary of Results

Season	Season series		at Los Angeles Angels	at Los Angeles Dodgers	Notes
Overall Regular Season	Angels	82‍–‍78	Angels, 46‍–‍34	Dodgers, 44‍–‍36	

=== Postseason series ===
As of 2026, the two sides have never met in the postseason. To meet in the postseason would require that they both advance to the World Series in the same year. To date, the two teams have made the postseason in the same season four times: 2004, 2008, 2009, and 2014. In 2009, both teams advanced to their respective League Championship Series. The Angels lost the ALCS 4–2 to the eventual champion New York Yankees, while the Dodgers lost the NLCS to the Philadelphia Phillies, 4–1. This would be the only time each team qualified for its League Championship Series in the same season.

The Angels won their only World Series appearance in 2002. The Dodgers have seen nine World Series titles and eight in Los Angeles, most recently winning in 2025.

== See also ==
- Major League Baseball rivalries

=== Other rivalries in the Los Angeles area ===
- National Hockey League: Freeway Face-Off
- College Football: UCLA–USC rivalry
- National Football League: The Battle of Los Angeles
- Major League Soccer: El Tráfico
- Major League Soccer: Honda SuperClasico (former)
- National Basketball Association: Lakers–Clippers rivalry
