= Lakers–Clippers rivalry =

National Basketball Association cross-town rivalry in Los Angeles

- The Lakers' Pau Gasol and The Clippers' DeAndre Jordan contest at the tip-off, December 8, 2010

- Los Angeles Lakers Los Angeles Clippers
- Other names: Battle of L.A. Hallway Series (1999-2024)
- Location: Los Angeles
- First meeting: October 30, 1970; Lakers 104, Braves 90
- Latest meeting: October 28, 2026; Lakers 103, Clippers 87
- Next meeting: January 11, 2027

Statistics
- Total meetings: 249
- All-time series: 160–89 (LAL)
- Regular season series: 160–89 (LAL)
- Longest win streak: LAL W16
- Current win streak: LAL W3

The Lakers–Clippers rivalry is a National Basketball Association (NBA) rivalry between the Los Angeles Lakers and Los Angeles Clippers. The two Pacific Division teams both play their home games in the Greater Los Angeles area, thus inspiring their matchups to sometimes be called the "Battle of L.A." The Lakers originally relocated from Minneapolis in 1960, while the Clippers moved from San Diego in 1984 after previously moving to San Diego from Buffalo, New York, while going away from the original Buffalo Braves name in 1978. While Los Angeles fans have historically favored the Lakers, the Clippers have sold out or filled capacity for every home game at Staples Center since February 2011 and entered the 2016–17 season with the sixth-longest active sellout streak in the NBA, which continued up until the COVID-19 pandemic. The Lakers have won 12 of their 17 NBA championships since moving to Los Angeles. Meanwhile, the Clippers are the oldest franchise in North American professional sports to have never appeared in a championship game. Some contended that the term rivalry was inaccurate due to the Lakers' historical success and the Clippers' historical lack of success. In the 2012–13 season, the Clippers won the first of six straight season series against the Lakers.

The Lakers hold a 107–66 advantage in the all-time series since the Clippers moved to Los Angeles. (Note: Only includes games since the Clippers moved to Los Angeles; does not include games when the franchise was known as the Buffalo Braves or San Diego Clippers. The Lakers lead 153–87 all-time against the Braves/Clippers franchise.) The two teams have never met in the playoffs. The Lakers lost a 3–1 series lead and failed to advance to the Western Conference semifinals against the Clippers in 2006, while the Clippers also lost a 3–1 lead against the Denver Nuggets in 2020, nixing a conference finals matchup with the eventual NBA champion Lakers.

From the opening of Crypto.com Arena (known then as Staples Center) in 1999, the Lakers and Clippers shared the arena, when their matchups were sometimes called the "Hallway Series". The Clippers moved to Intuit Dome in Inglewood in 2024, while the Lakers remained at Crypto.com Arena.

== History ==
=== 1970–1984: Early years ===
The Lakers had existed in Los Angeles since 1960 after relocating there from Minneapolis, for which they had played in the NBA since 1948 since moving over from the NBL a season prior and won 5 championships there before the Clippers were founded in 1970 as the Buffalo Braves. During their first match against each other, the Lakers beat the Braves 104–90 on October 30, 1970, at The Forum, continuing the middle of what became a 9-game losing streak for Buffalo after debuting with a 107–92 win over the Cleveland Cavaliers. The Braves originally played in the Atlantic Division before moving to San Diego in the 1978–79 season and were subsequently renamed the Clippers, officially joining the Lakers in the Pacific Division. San Diego won in their first game against the Lakers, winning 124–113 on October 24, 1978. "This is a good way to start off a rivalry", said Clippers owner Irv Levin afterwards.

=== 1984: First years together in Los Angeles ===
The Lakers were joined by the Clippers in Los Angeles in 1984 after six seasons in San Diego following the Clippers' ownership change to Donald Sterling. The team originally made their home in the Los Angeles Memorial Sports Arena (formerly the Lakers' home arena from 1960 to 1967), about 10 miles (16 km) from the Lakers then-home at The Forum in Inglewood. After the Clippers move, the teams drew a crowd of 14,991 in their first meeting at the Sports Arena; it was the then-largest home-court attendance in Clippers history. The fans were evenly divided in their support of the two teams. The Lakers won 108–103, and the Associated Press (AP) wrote that "a crosstown rivalry was born". Former Lakers guard Norm Nixon, then in his second year with the Clippers, said "I think it's going to great every time we play ... When we get some more [wins], our fans won't have to cover their heads with their hats anymore." The Clippers marketed themselves as the "People's Team" with ticket prices ($4, $8, $12, and $15) that were lower than the Lakers ($7, $9.50, $13.50, and $27.50 and above). Lakers coach Pat Riley commented, "I felt we've done more the last 20 years to be the 'People's Team'"

=== 1984–2013: Lakers success and Clippers struggles ===
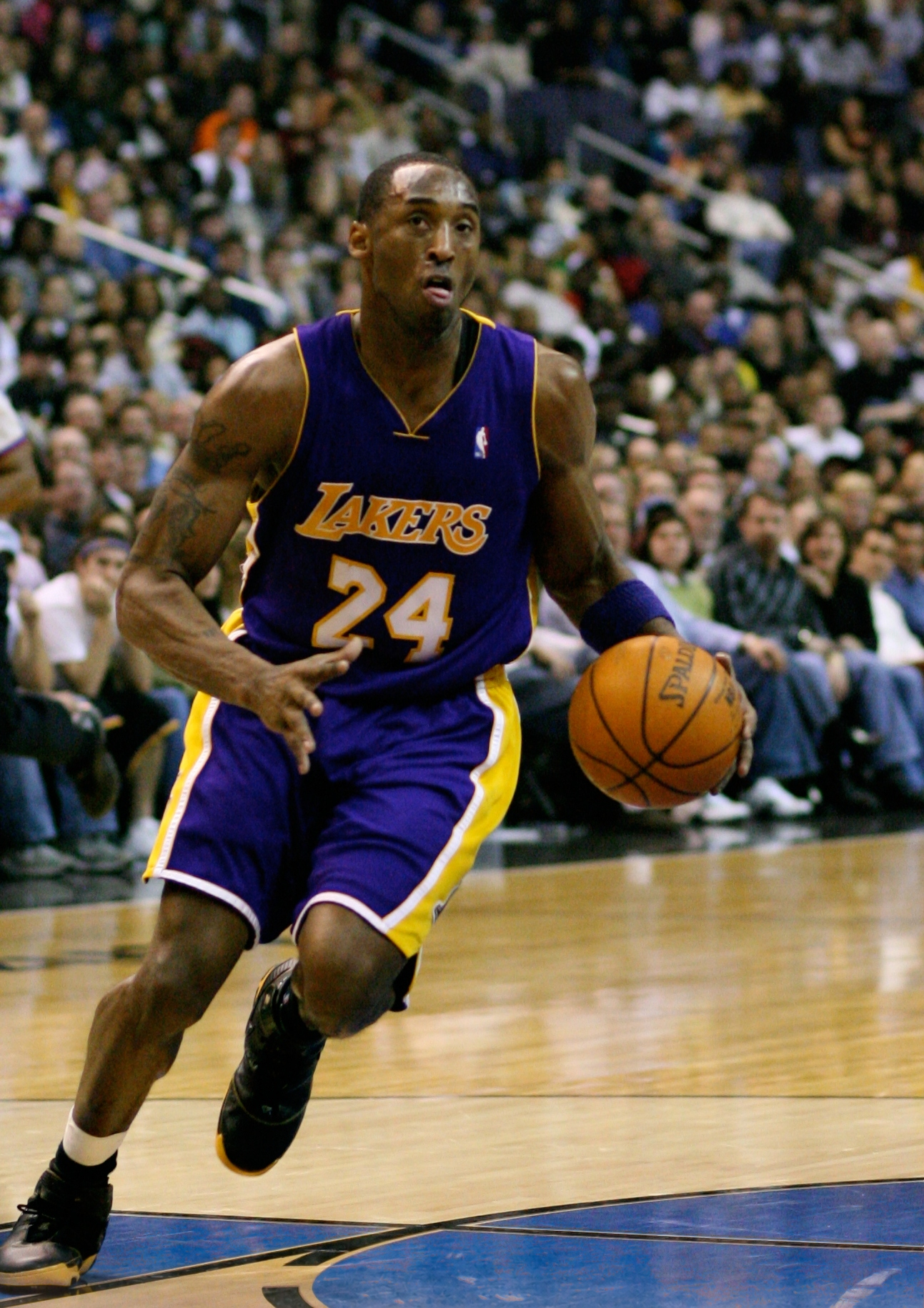
Kobe Bryant in 2004 considered signing with the Clippers before re-signing with the Lakers.

By 1986, the Lakers were still undefeated against the Clippers, and AP offered that it was "a crosstown rivalry that hasn't been much of one." Lakers fans would outnumber Clippers fans at the Sports Arena during the teams' matchups for years until 1992, when the Clippers had their first winning season since 1978–79 and their first playoff appearance since 1976. The Lakers, on the other hand, struggled in 1991–92 with Lakers great Magic Johnson's retirement after he tested positive for HIV. The Clippers ended a 27-game Forum losing streak against the Lakers that season, and they finished with a better record than the Lakers. They again finished ahead of the Lakers in 1992–93. They also won the season series against the Lakers for the first time since moving to Los Angeles. It was also their first as a franchise since 1974–75, when they were still the Buffalo Braves. In 1993–94, both teams missed the playoffs marking the first time that both teams had missed the postseason in the same season, a feat that was later repeated in the 2004–2005 season, when the Clippers finished 37-45 and the Lakers finished 34–48.

From the 1994–95 to 1998–99 seasons, the Clippers played a limited number of home games at the Arrowhead Pond of Anaheim (now Honda Center). In those seasons, the Clippers played the Lakers at the Pond only three times, compiling a record of 1–2 against the Lakers in Anaheim. A deal to move the Clippers to Anaheim on a permanent basis was declined by the team in 1996, leading to the eventual decision to have the Clippers join the Lakers at the Staples Center when it opened in 1999.

The Clippers did not finish ahead of the Lakers again until 2004–05. Lakers star Kobe Bryant almost joined the Clippers that season as a free agent before re-signing with the Lakers. The Clippers in 2005–06 won 47 games and finished two games ahead of the Lakers. During the season, Bryant said that "rivalries are made in the playoffs, not in the regular season". In the 2006 playoffs, the Lakers built a 3–1 first-round series lead against the Phoenix Suns before losing 4–3, spoiling a potential crosstown matchup with the Clippers in the second round. The Clippers’ second-round series against Phoenix drew higher television ratings in Southern California than the Lakers’ first-round loss to Phoenix. They missed the conference finals by one game, losing 4–3 to the Suns akin to the Lakers losing to the Suns 4–3 earlier in the first round.

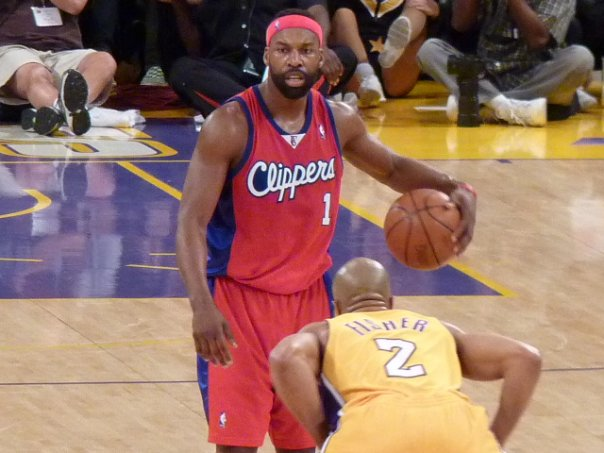
The Clippers' Baron Davis being defended by the Lakers' Derek Fisher in 2010

Prior to a matchup in 2008 with the Lakers at 3–0 and the Clippers 0–4, the Los Angeles Times wrote that "even the involved parties have trouble referring to this thing as a rivalry." Lakers coach Phil Jackson said the two teams were "always going to be a rivalry" yet on many occasions, he picked on the Clippers' often poor record.

=== 2013–2019: Roles reversed ===
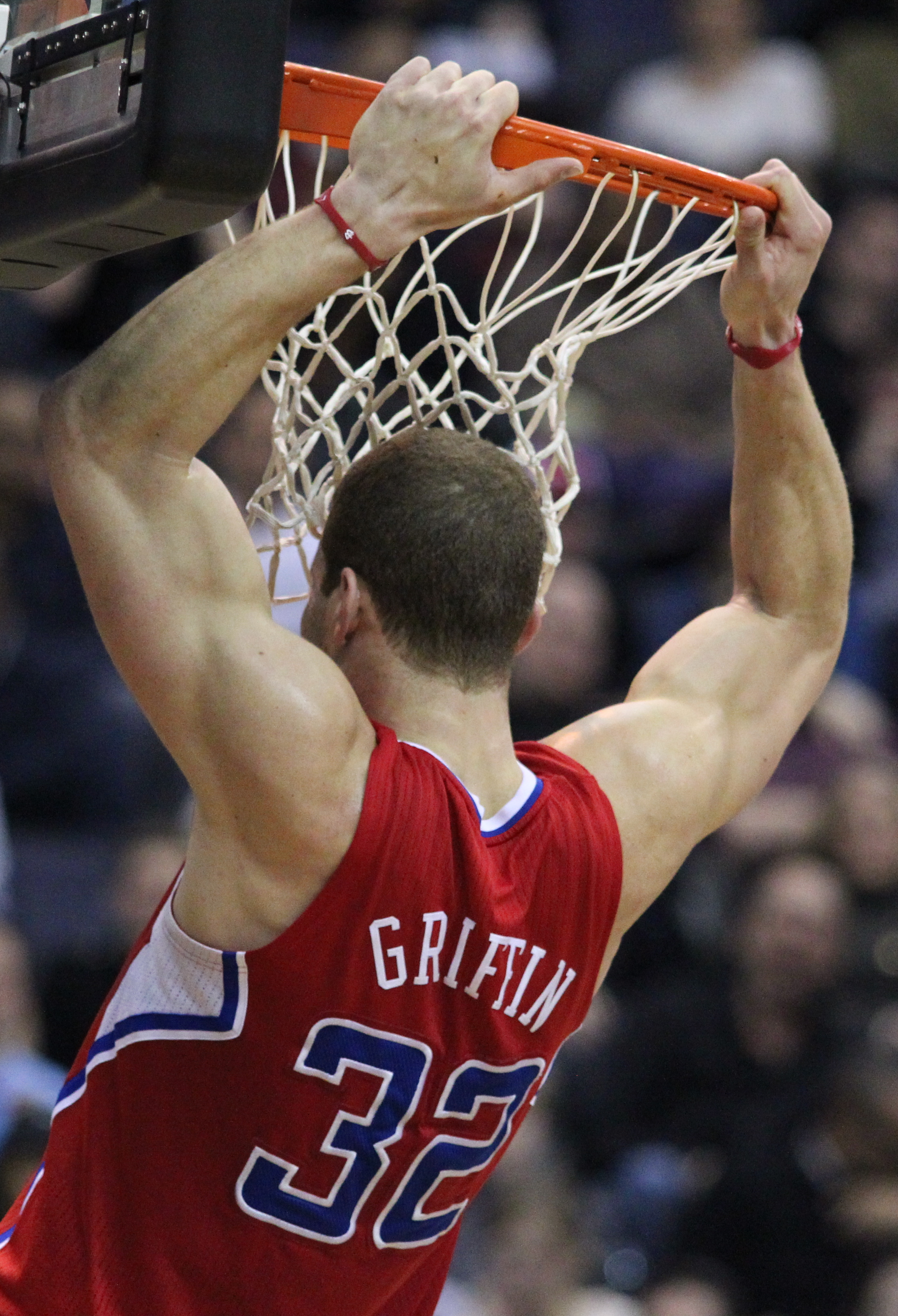
Blake Griffin's highlight plays renewed interest in the Clippers.

Starting with the 2010–11 season, Blake Griffin, with his highlight reel plays, helped draw interest in the Clippers. A turning point in the rivalry occurred before the following season, when the Lakers thought they had acquired Chris Paul in a trade from the New Orleans Hornets, but commissioner David Stern vetoed the trade and Paul was instead traded to the Clippers. Prior to Paul's arrival, the Clippers had the worst overall winning percentage in the NBA (.349) since they moved to Los Angeles, while the Lakers during that same period had the best (.659).

In a game that season between the two teams won by the Clippers, tempers flared and seven technical fouls were called. Although it was a home game for the Clippers at Staples, Clippers fans were still outnumbered by Lakers fans. In a heated rematch won by the Lakers, ESPN wrote, "If the Staples co-tenants didn't have a rivalry before [the game], they have one now." Paul was upset after the game that Lakers forward Pau Gasol touched him on the head. "...don't touch the top of my head like I'm one of your kids", warned Paul. Some Clippers in 2012 denied that a rivalry existed. Griffin offered that "a rivalry has to be evenly matched, and this one hasn't been over the years." Clippers center DeAndre Jordan said the Lakers "are proven. They have more championships. They have Hall of Famer players. We're still a young team."

The Clippers in 2011–12 had a winning record for only the third time since Donald Sterling bought the team in 1981 and made the playoffs for only the fifth time since moving to Los Angeles. The Clippers led the Lakers by 2 1/2 games in mid-February before the Lakers overtook them by one game for the Pacific Division title.

For the first time in 2012–13, the Clippers, like the Lakers, had reasonable expectations to win an NBA championship. The Clippers signed former Lakers Ronny Turiaf, Matt Barnes, and Lamar Odom, who joined Caron Butler as Clippers who had played for the Lakers. Coach Mike Brown of the 0–2 Lakers called the 1–0 Clippers "a better team" prior to their first meeting. He added, "It's sort of a rivalry now, and so it will probably be a physical game." However, Brown likened the Clippers to his Cleveland Cavaliers teams with LeBron James trying to form a rivalry with the Boston Celtics despite Cleveland's lack of championships. Lakers fans booed the Clippers during warmups and player introductions, which Griffin did not witness before during his rookie season. He said Lakers fans "didn't really care" about the Clippers before, and he attributed the newfound attention to his team's turnaround. The Clippers won the game, dropping the Lakers to 0–3 for the first time in 34 years. The game was televised by ESPN and drew a 5.9 rating in Los Angeles, the network's highest-rated regular season game ever in the L.A. market. The Clippers later defeated the defending NBA champions, the Miami Heat, but the city was more engrossed in the Lakers' firing of Brown and the hiring of Mike D'Antoni. Heat coach Erik Spoelstra subsequently called the Clippers "legit contenders for the title", while Arash Markazi of ESPN.com called them "the best team in L.A." Prior to their second meeting that season, the Clippers were 25–8 and fighting for the best record in the league, while the Lakers were 15–16—nine games behind the Clippers—and looking to secure a playoff spot in the Western Conference. For only the fourth time in their prior 127 meetings since they moved to Los Angeles, the Clippers had a better record than the Lakers entering their matchup when both teams had played 30 or more games. Prior to the game, Bryant called the Clippers "top contenders" for a championship. The Clippers won 107–102 in a nationally televised game that gave ESPN its best NBA regular-season overnight rating (2.7) in nearly two years. The local Los Angeles rating of 5.7 was the second highest ever behind the record set in the teams' previous meeting. The Clippers also won their third meeting, 125–101, after starting the game with a 15–0 lead. The win clinched the season series for the Clippers for the first time in 20 years since 1992–93. On April 7, the Clippers defeated the Lakers 109–95, clinching their first Pacific Division title in franchise history. The Lakers had won 23 of the previous 42 division titles. The win also completed a season sweep of the Lakers, 4–0. The franchise had not swept the Lakers since 1974–75, when they were in Buffalo. While both teams qualified for the playoffs that season, they were both eliminated in the first round, as the Lakers were swept by the San Antonio Spurs, and the Clippers lost in six games to the Memphis Grizzlies. It would be the Lakers last playoff appearance until 2020, their longest postseason drought in franchise history.

The Clippers in 2013–14 hired former Clippers player Doc Rivers as their new coach. He previously coached the Boston Celtics, whom the Los Angeles Times called "the Lakers' true rivals", where he won one NBA Finals and lost another in the Celtics–Lakers rivalry. Rivers said that Los Angeles "always will be" a Lakers town, but he also predicted that people that moved from the East Coast to L.A. would root for the Clippers if they won an NBA title. On January 10, 2014, the Clippers avenged a 13-point season opener loss to the Lakers with a 123–87 blowout in their next meeting. At the time, the 36-point margin was the Clippers' largest ever against the Lakers, who were near the bottom of the conference standing and losers for the tenth time in 11 games, a bad stretch they had not duplicated since they last missed the playoffs in 2004–05. On March 6, the Clippers defeated the Lakers 142–94; the 48-point margin was the largest victory ever by the Clippers against any opponent, as well as the most one-sided defeat in Lakers history. While the Clippers went on to win the Pacific Division title and qualify for the playoffs, the Lakers finished with one of the worst records in the Western Conference, with a record of 27–55, a stark contrast from previous years, and starting an era of futility for the Lakers. In the playoffs, the Clippers defeated the Golden State Warriors in seven games in the first round, but would lose to the Oklahoma City Thunder in six games in the semifinals.

After the 2013–14 season, D'Antoni resigned as Lakers coach, and the team replaced him with Byron Scott, a former guard from their Showtime era. The Clippers underwent an ownership change after Steve Ballmer purchased the team from Sterling, whose racist comments prompted his wife to sell the team against his wishes. Scott stated that there was still no rivalry with the Clippers. "Celtics-Lakers, that's a rivalry", he said. On April 5, 2015, the Clippers won its sixth straight against the Lakers for their longest winning streak in the series in the franchise's history. (Note: The Buffalo Braves set the previous mark with a five-game win against the Lakers (November 3, 1974 – November 18, 1975)) The 106–78 win was also the fewest points they had ever allowed to the Lakers. It was the Lakers' 56th loss of the season, which surpassed the team high established the year before, when they finished with a 27–55 record. In the playoffs, the Clippers were leading the Houston Rockets 3–1 in the conference semifinals, but became just the ninth team in NBA history with that lead to lose the series. Earlier in the series, former Lakers player Magic Johnson had thought that the Clippers could win the championship. However, after they were eliminated, he stated: "I was wrong. The Clippers are still the Clippers."

Entering the 2018–19 season, the Clippers had won the last six season series against the Lakers. After acquiring free agent LeBron James, the Lakers hoped to re-establish their dominance in Los Angeles and were expected to end their five-year playoff drought. However, entering the clubs' March 2019 matchup, the Lakers were 4 1/2 games behind for the eighth and final playoff berth in the West, and five behind the No. 7 Clippers. The Clippers won 113–105.

=== 2019–present: Potential playoff meeting ===
Both the Lakers and Clippers made major offseason moves entering 2019–20. The Lakers acquired Anthony Davis from the New Orleans Pelicans, while the Clippers signed free agent Kawhi Leonard and traded for Paul George from the Oklahoma City Thunder. The Lakers, who had also been interested in Leonard, held up the Davis trade after Leonard asked them to wait on his decision on possibly pairing with James and Davis. The Lakers also hired Frank Vogel to replace Luke Walton as their head coach. Tyronn Lue, who won two NBA championships as a player with the Lakers in 2000 and 2001 and coached Cleveland to an NBA title with James in 2016, was the frontrunner for the Lakers' position, but he wanted a longer-term deal and rejected the team's three-year offer. He instead joined the Clippers as an assistant.

The Clippers became a popular pick to win the NBA championship. Their marketing campaign sold the team's grit over the Lakers' Hollywood glitz with slogans including "Streetlights Over Spotlights". In his 2021 book Inside the NBA Bubble: A Championship Season under Quarantine, the Lakers Jared Dudley, who played for the Clippers in 2013–14, recalled that the Lakers were motivated by the Clippers' billboard campaign, and he said the Lakers felt disrespected that George called Leonard and himself the top duo in the league, ahead of James and Davis. Both teams were predicted all season long to reach the Western Conference finals. The NBA placed marquee matchups between them on opening night and on Christmas Day, with the Clippers winning both. At the trade deadline in February 2020, both teams vied to acquire Marcus Morris from the New York Knicks, but the Clippers prevailed as the Lakers had limited assets to trade as a result of the Davis deal. The Lakers acquired his twin brother, Markieff Morris, later in the month.

After the months-long 2019–20 NBA season suspension concluded in the 2020 NBA Bubble area, the Lakers ended the regular season with the best record in the Western Conference, while the Clippers finished second. The Lakers advanced to the Conference Finals after eliminating Houston 4–1, and they awaited the winner of the other semifinals series, where the Clippers were up 3–2 at the time against the Denver Nuggets. However, the Clippers were eliminated 4–3, blowing a 3–1 series lead after being up in the final three games by 16, 19, and 12 points, respectively. The Lakers advanced to the Finals for the first time since 2010, where they defeated Miami 4–2 for their 17th NBA title, tying the Celtics for the most championships in league history.

During the offseason, Clippers free agent Montrezl Harrell, who was the reigning NBA Sixth Man of the Year, signed a two-year contract for the mid-level exception to join the Lakers. The Clippers replaced Rivers as head coach with his assistant Lue. Despite losing Leonard in the playoffs after a partial tear of the anterior cruciate ligament in his right knee, they advanced to the Western Conference Finals for the first time in franchise history. However, they ultimately lost their first Western Conference Finals series 4–2 to the Phoenix Suns, who coincidentally also beat the Lakers 4–2 in the first round in their first playoff appearance since 2010. In 2021–22, the Lakers added Russell Westbrook to team with James and Davis, and were again favorites to win the West, while the Clippers expected Leonard to be out for most of the season after knee surgery. The Clippers swept the season series with the Lakers and extended their winning streak in the rivalry to seven. They were 32–7 against the Lakers since 2012–13. After being bought out by the Utah Jazz, Russell Westbrook signed with the Clippers.

In the teams' first meeting of the 2023–24 NBA season, the Lakers exacted their revenge against the Clippers, winning 130–125 in overtime. The win ended the Lakers' 11-game losing streak over the Clippers, and was highlighted by LeBron James' 35-point performance, surpassing Karl Malone for the most 30-point games since turning 35. On February 28, 2024, the Lakers won 116–112 against the Clippers in their last regular season meeting as co-tenants of Crypto.com Arena. LeBron James helped rally the Lakers back from a 21-point deficit by scoring 19 points all by himself during the fourth quarter.

Both teams faced off in the 2025 NBA Cup under West Group B. The Lakers defeated the Clippers 135–118 at home in the group stage game on November 25, clinching the group and in turn a spot in the knockout stage. With the win, the Lakers extended their winning streak to five, while this marked the Clippers' 11th loss in their recent 13 games.

== Arenas ==
=== Los Angeles Memorial Sports Arena and The Forum ===
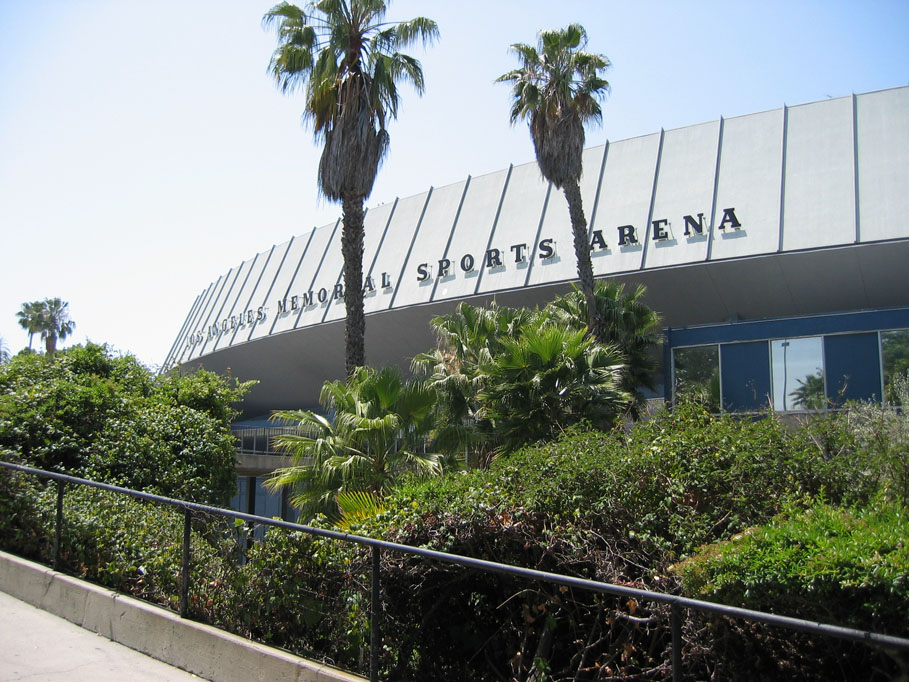
Los Angeles Memorial Sports Arena served as the home arena for the Lakers from 1960 to 1967. After the Clippers moved to Los Angeles in 1984, they occupied this arena until 1999.

The Los Angeles Memorial Sports Arena hosted games for both the Lakers and the Clippers, but not simultaneously. The LA Sports Arena first served as the Lakers' home arena from 1960 to 1967, after which they relocated to a newly-opened arena in Inglewood named The Forum. The Lakers called The Forum (later known as the Great Western Forum) until 1999. When the Clippers relocated to Los Angeles in 1984, they occupied the LA Sports Arena until 1999. The Forum and the LA Sports Arena were separated by around 10 miles (16 km). While the since-renamed Kia Forum remained active as an alternate arena to the Intuit Dome (see below), the LA Sports Arena has since been demolished in 2016, with the BMO Stadium now occupying its footprint.

Additionally, the Clippers played a few home games at Arrowhead Pond in nearby Anaheim during the mid-to-late 1990s, but decided against moving to the arena full-time.

=== Crypto.com Arena ===
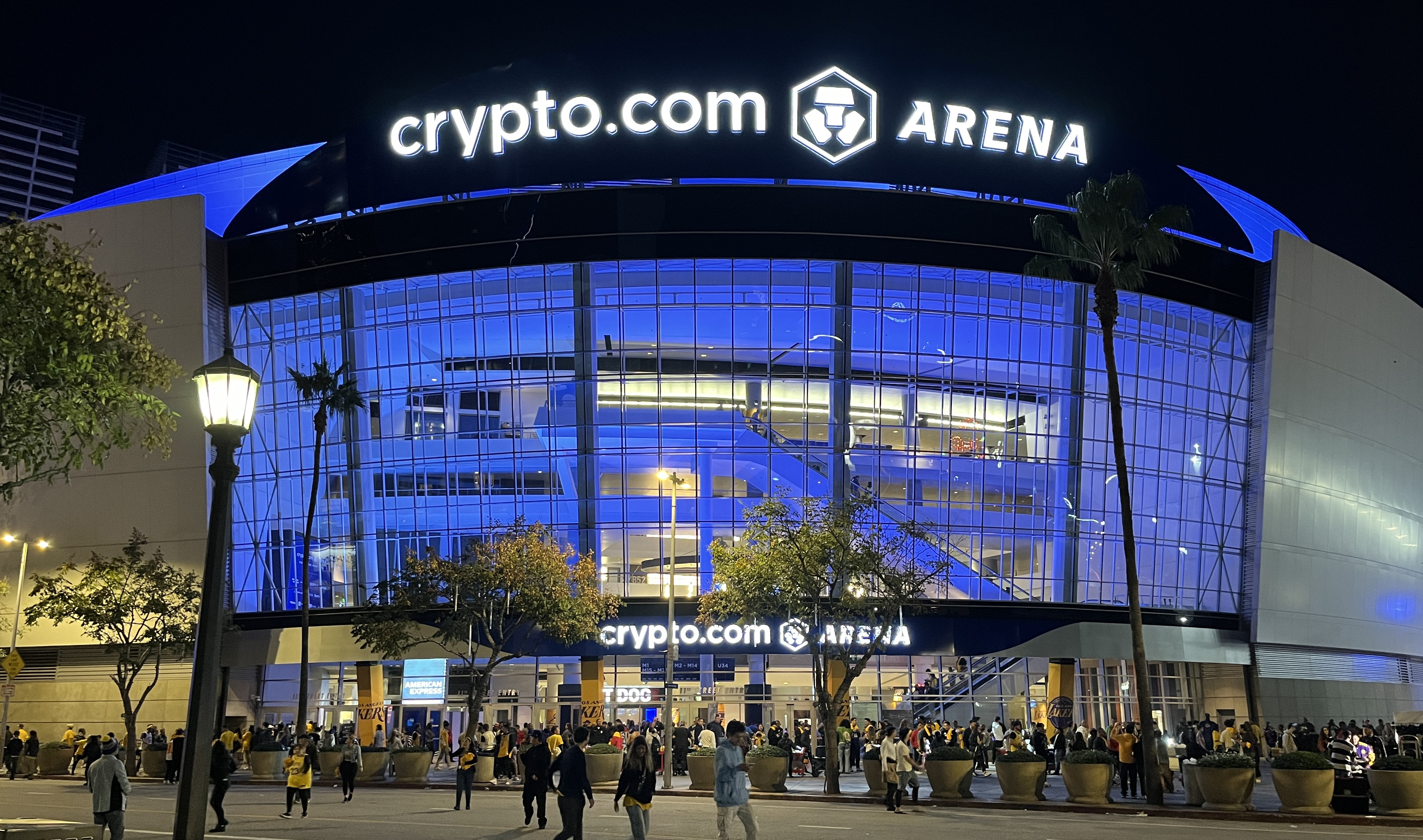
Crypto.com Arena served as the home arena for both the Lakers and Clippers from 1999 to 2024. The Clippers moved to Intuit Dome in 2024.

The Crypto.com Arena, formerly known as the Staples Center until 2021, was the home arena of both teams from 1999 to 2024. Their locker rooms were 70 feet (21 m) down a concrete-floored hallway from one another, inspiring the series between the two to sometimes be referred to as the "Hallway Series". The name was patterned after other notable crosstown rivalries such as baseball's Subway Series in New York, Crosstown Series in Chicago and the Freeway Series in Los Angeles.

The Lakers' locker room was larger than the Clippers’. The arena's seats were originally colored purple, the primary color of the Lakers, as well as the primary colors at the time of construction for the Los Angeles Kings, the National Hockey League (NHL) team that also shares Staples Center. However, the seats were replaced with black ones in 2005. The Clippers were the only one of the four tenants in the arena without any banners hanging to commemorate championships or retired numbers (the team electing to place the banners for their two division titles in their practice facility instead of the Crypto.com Arena). (Note: Crypto.com Arena is also home to the Los Angeles Sparks of the Women's National Basketball Association (WNBA).)

Starting in the 2013–14 season, during their home games, the Clippers covered the Lakers' banners, which was the Clippers' then-new coach Doc Rivers' idea. Prior to that season, Lakers banners were previously visible in the rafters even during Clippers games. Lakers games feature dramatic lighting made possible by additional lights purchased by the Lakers. Through the 2013–14 season, the same experience was not provided during Clippers games; however, new LED lights were installed for the Clippers and Kings prior to their 2014–15 seasons that produced a similar effect to the Lakers' lighting.

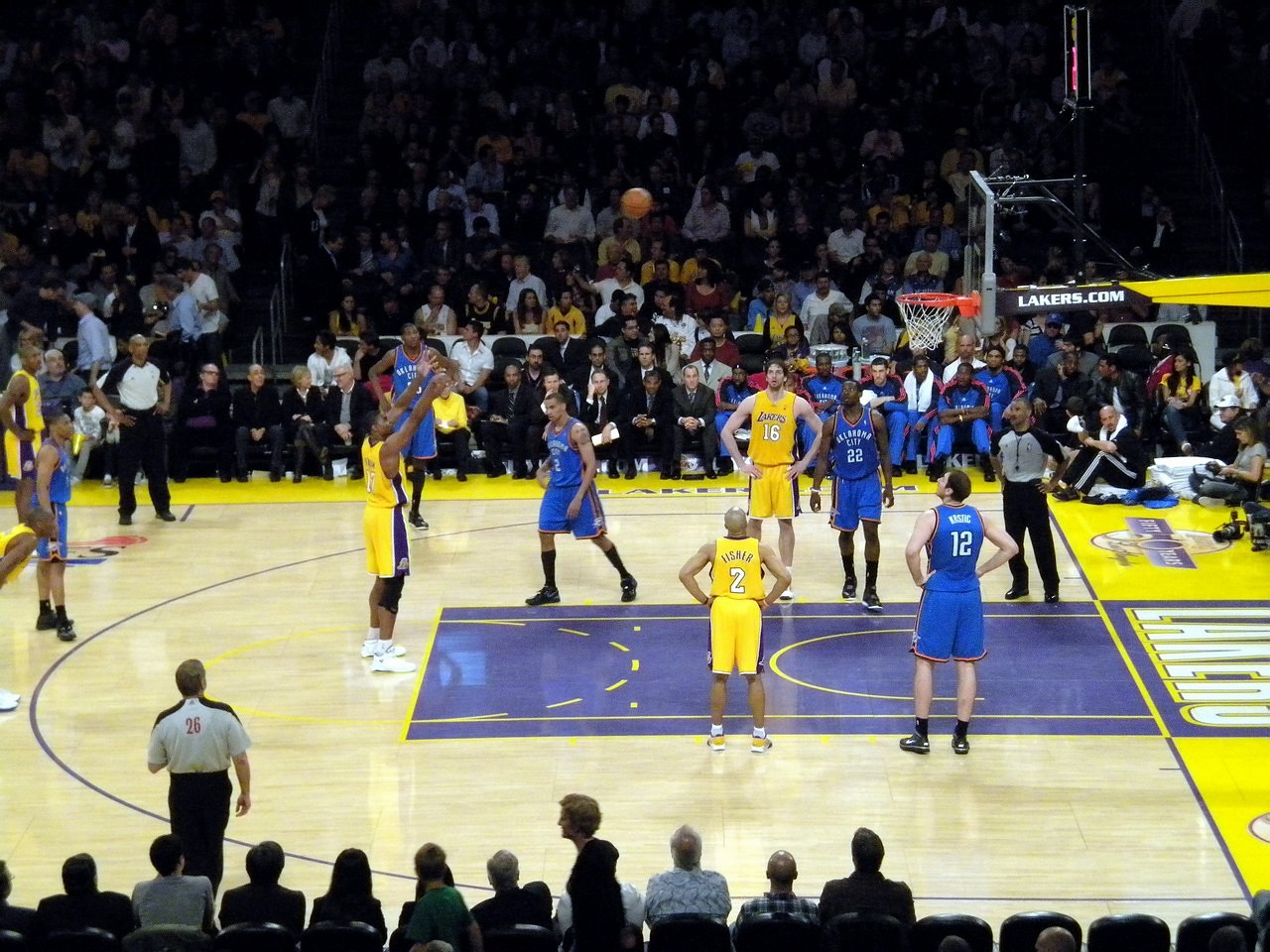
Crypto.com Arena during Lakers (top) and Clippers (bottom) home games.

Hollywood celebrities are often present at Lakers games, most notably Jack Nicholson, while the most recognizable Clipper fan at times is superfan Clipper Darrell. "We do at times feel like the stepchild", said player DeAndre Jordan. "But at the same time, those guys have been highly successful. They have banners in their arena." Citing the energy of Clippers fans, Bryant called away games against the Clippers at Crypto.com Arena his second favorite venue behind Madison Square Garden, the home of the New York Knicks.

During exhibition games in December 2012 between the two teams, courtside seats with the Lakers as the designated home team were sold at $2,750, while the same seats at the Clippers home game days later went for $1,100. Before the arrival of Griffin and Paul, both among the top players in the NBA, the Clippers would market their opponents' star players to improve ticket sales. As attractive as the Clippers were becoming, it was hard to overcome Los Angeles' affection for the Lakers that had spanned over 50 years. For the 2015–16 season, the Clippers charged more than the Lakers for their top courtside seats. The Clippers' top tickets costed $2,840 each—which include food, parking, and admission to an exclusive Clippers hospitality room—while the Lakers' remained at $2,750 without food or parking.

The Lakers and Clippers often played doubleheaders at Crypto.com Arena, having played back-to-back games on the same day almost 60 times as of 2012. Separate admission was required for each game, with each team playing a different opponent. In between games, the court was reassembled with the respective home team's floor, which differed only in their paint scheme. The Clippers, who had only third priority behind the Lakers and Kings for arena scheduling, typically played the less preferable day game in a league where players and coaches are more familiar playing at night. Outside of Los Angeles, the last doubleheader in the NBA was in 1972 at Seattle Center Coliseum (now Climate Pledge Arena), when the Portland Trail Blazers played the Houston Rockets and the Seattle SuperSonics played the Philadelphia 76ers. The last regular season doubleheader between the Lakers and Clippers took place on April 7, 2024.

=== Intuit Dome ===
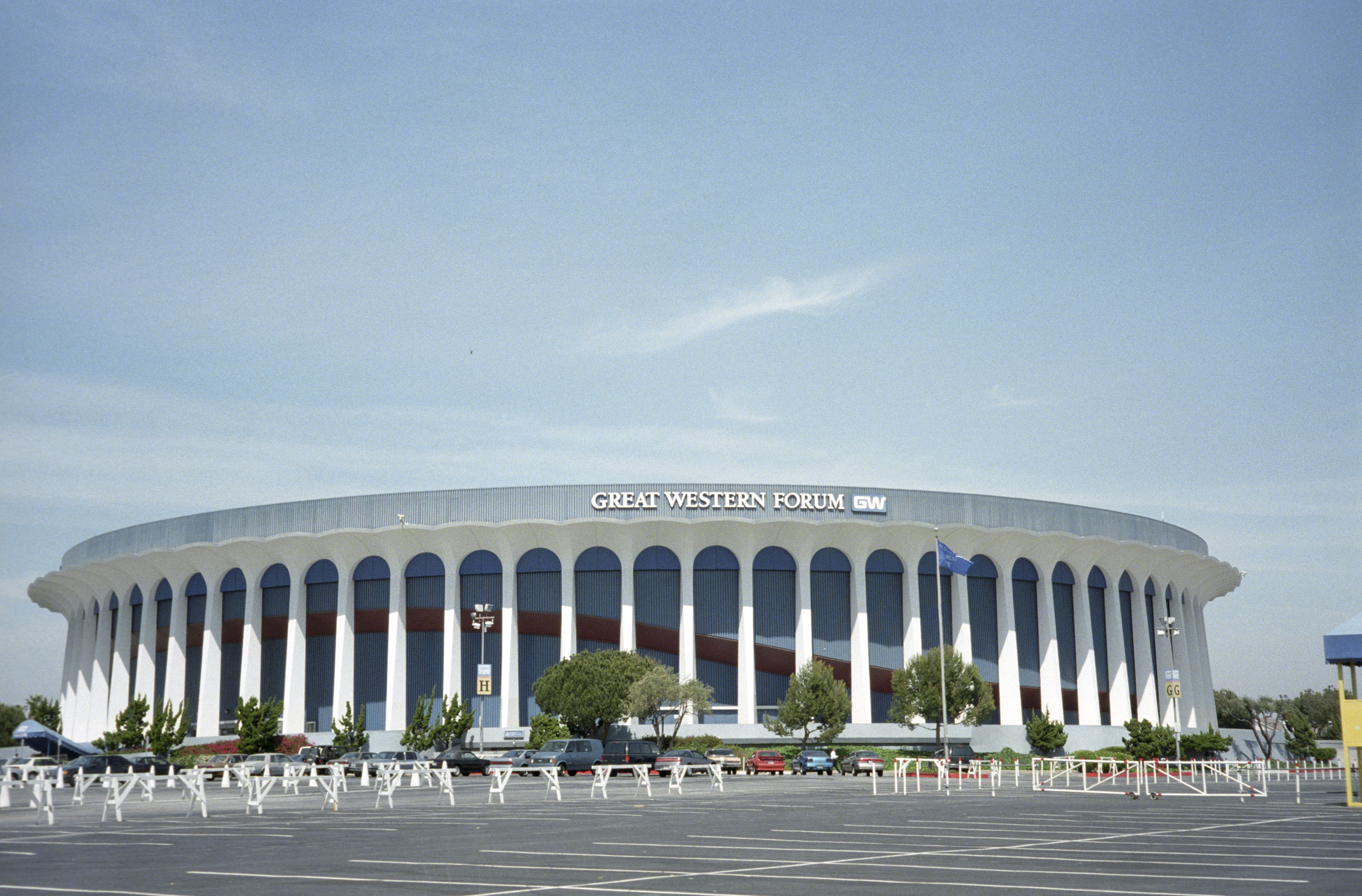
The Forum served as the Lakers' home arena from 1967 to 1999.

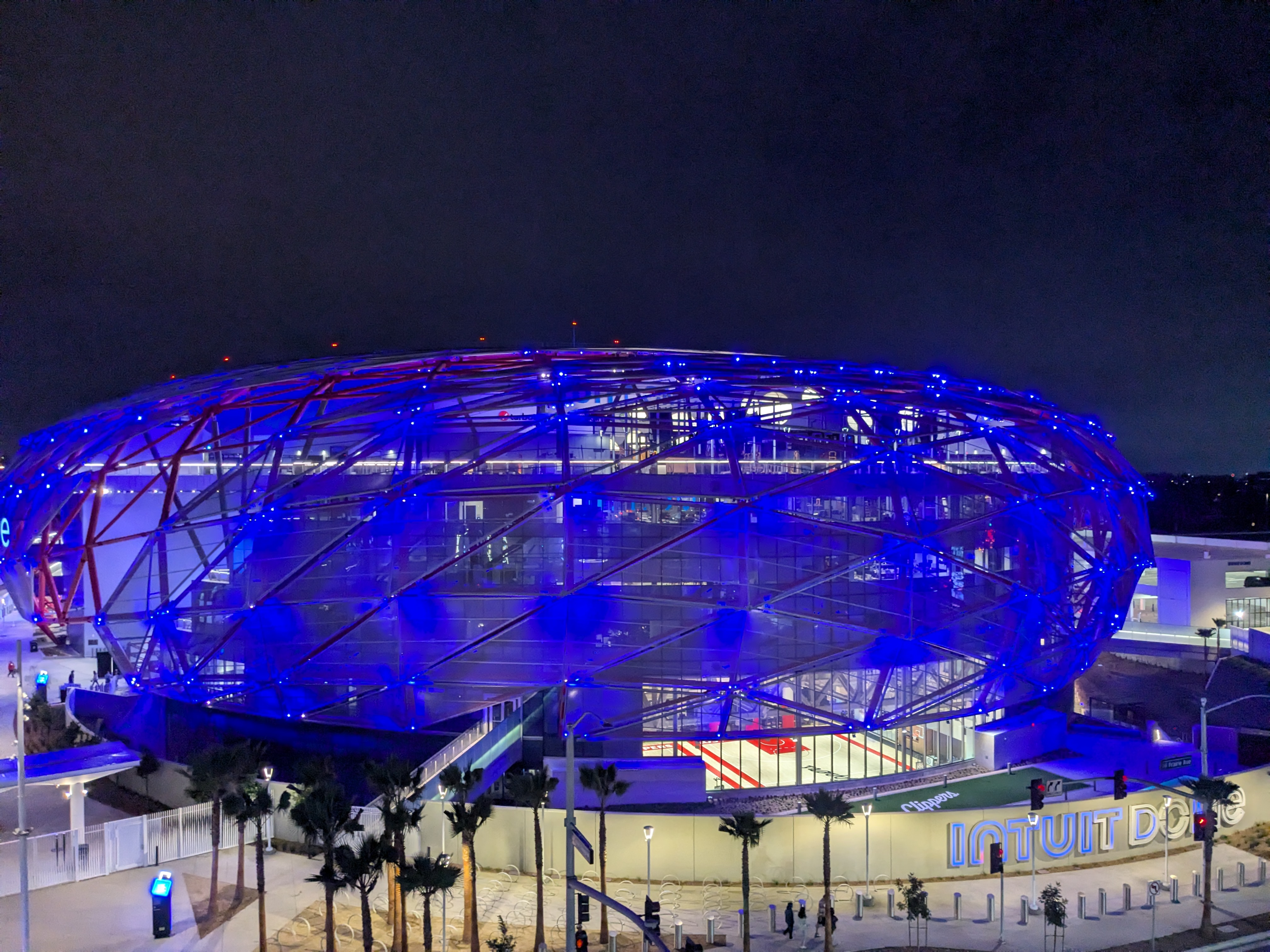
The Clippers moved to Intuit Dome in 2024. Clippers owner Steve Ballmer also purchased The Forum as part of the plan to build the arena.

The Clippers' lease at Crypto.com Arena ended following the conclusion of their 2023–24 season. In July 2020, the team received city approval for Intuit Dome; as part of the deal, Clippers owner Steve Ballmer purchased The Forum (the Lakers' home arena from 1967 to 1999) from Madison Square Garden Sports. The Clippers moved to Intuit Dome starting in the 2024–25 season. On the other hand, the Lakers' lease at the Crypto.com Arena was extended until 2041.

== See also ==
- Freeway Series
- Freeway Face-Off
- UCLA–USC rivalry
- El Tráfico
