= List of Vancouver Whitecaps FC records and statistics =

Vancouver Whitecaps FC is a Canadian professional soccer team based in Vancouver, British Columbia that competes in Major League Soccer (MLS). The Whitecaps are the 17th team of Major League Soccer and replaced the USSF Division 2 team of the same name, which was owned and managed by the same group that operates the MLS team, and which played through the conclusion of that league's 2010 season. The MLS team is the third to share the legacy of the Whitecaps name.

This is a list of franchise records for the Vancouver Whitecaps during the MLS period, dating from the 2011 MLS season to the present.

== Honours ==
=== Domestic competitions ===
- Major League Soccer

Conference champions (1): 2025

- Canadian Championship

Winners (5): 2015, 2022, 2023, 2024, 2025
Runners-up (5): 2011, 2012, 2013, 2016, 2018

- Minor trophies
  - Cascadia Cup

Winners (6): 2013, 2014, 2016, 2023, 2025, 2026

- Walt Disney World Pro Soccer Classic

Winners (1): 2012

=== International competitions ===
  - CONCACAF Champions Cup

Runners-up (1): 2025

== Key ==
Abbr.	Meaning
**CC**	Canadian Championship
**CCL**	CONCACAF Champions Cup
**MLS**	Major League Soccer
**Bolded** players are currently on the Whitecaps FC roster.

== Club records ==
=== Wins ===
- 7–0 vs. Philadelphia Union, September 13, 2025 (MLS)

=== Most goals scored ===
- 7 vs. Philadelphia Union, September 13, 2025 (MLS)

=== Losses ===
- 6–0 vs. LAFC, September 24, 2020 (MLS)
- 6–0 vs. Sporting Kansas City, April 21, 2018 (MLS)

=== Most goals allowed ===
- 6 vs. LAFC, September 24, 2020 (MLS)
- 6 vs. Sporting Kansas City, April 21, 2018 (MLS)
- 6 vs. LAFC, July 7, 2019 (MLS)

=== Home attendance ===
- 53,957 vs. LAFC, November 22, 2025 (MLS)

=== Away attendance ===
- 55,765 vs. Seattle Sounders FC, October 11, 2014 (MLS)

=== Club Firsts ===
- First MLS Match and Win: March 19, 2011 4–2 vs. Toronto FC
- First MLS Goal and Brace: Eric Hassli vs. Toronto FC March 19, 2011
- First MLS Assist: Atiba Harris vs. Toronto FC March 19, 2011
- First Starting XI: 18.Jay Nolly, 25.Jonathan Leathers, 6.Jay DeMerit, 2.Michael Boxall, 4.Alain Rochat; 20.Davide Chiumiento, 28.Gershon Koffie, 7. Terry Dunfield, 31. Russell Teibert, 9. Atiba Harris, 29. Eric Hassli
- First Match at BC Place: October 2, 2011 vs. Portland Timbers
- First Goal at BC Place: October 6, 2011 Camilo vs. Real Salt Lake
- First Shutout at BC Place: October 6, 2011 Joe Cannon
- First MLS Shutout: April 16 vs. Chivas USA Jay Nolly
- First Transfer Out: November 24, 2010 Alan Gordon and Alejandro Moreno to Chivas USA for allocation money and an International Roster Spot for 2011
- First Transfer in: Jay DeMerit on a free November 18, 2010
- First Designated Player: Eric Hassli
- First Super Draft Pick: 2011 MLS SuperDraft Omar Salgado
- First MLS Cup Playoff Game: November 1, 2012 1–2 vs. LA Galaxy
- First MLS Cup Playoff Goal: November 1, 2012 Darren Mattocks vs. LA Galaxy
- First MLS Cup Playoff Win: October 25, 2017 5–0 vs. San Jose Earthquake
- First CONCACAF Champions League Game: August 5, 2015 1–1 vs. Seattle Sounders FC
- First CONCACAF Champions League Win: September 16, 2015 1–0 vs. Olimpia
- First Canadian Championship Match and Win: April 27, 2011 vs. Montreal Impact
- First Canadian Championship Title: August 25, 2015 vs. Montreal Impact
- First Homegrown Player Signing: November 26, 2010 Philippe Davies
- First Player Signed from MLS Next Pro Team: November 16, 2022 Ali Ahmed
- First Cascadia Cup Match in MLS: June 11, 2011 2–2 vs. Seattle Sounders
- First Cascadia Cup Goal in MLS: June 11, 2011 Eric Hassli vs. Seattle Sounders
- First Cascadia Cup Trophy Win: 2013
- First Leagues Cup Game: July 21, 2023 2–2 (15:16 in penalties) vs. Club León
- First Leagues Cup Goal and Brace: July 21, 2023 Sergio Córdova vs. Club León
- First Leagues Cup Assist: July 21, 2023 Sebastian Berhalter vs. Club León
- First Leagues Cup Win: July 30, 2023 2–1 vs. LA Galaxy
- First Penalty Shoot-out: May 17, 2014 vs. Toronto FC
- First Penalty Shoot-out Win: May 25, 2022 vs. Cavalry FC
- First Player to Reach 10 Goals for the Whitecaps: Eric Hassli July 8, 2011
- First Player to Reach 20 Goals for the Whitecaps: Camilo May 18, 2013
- First Player to Reach 30 Goals for the Whitecaps: Camilo July 20, 2013
- First Player to Reach 40 Goals for the Whitecaps: Camilo October 27, 2013
- First Player to Reach 50 Goals for the Whitecaps: Brian White April 12, 2025
- First Player to Reach 100 Appearances for the Whitecaps: Gershon Koffie May 11, 2014
- First Player to Reach 200 Appearances for the Whitecaps: Jordan Harvey June 25, 2015
- First Player to Reach 300 Appearances for the Whitecaps: Russell Teibert August 27, 2023
- Total Nationalities represented on Whitecaps: 57 (As of February 25, 2023)

== Player records ==
=== Most Appearances ===
As of December 31, 2025

Bolded players are currently on the Whitecaps FC roster.

#	Pos.	Name	Nation	Career	MLS*	Playoffs	CC	CCL	LC	Total
1	Midfielder	Russell Teibert	Canada	2011–2023	255	2	32	10	2	301
2	Defender	Jordan Harvey	United States	2011–2017	179	5	13	4	0	201
3	Defender	**Ranko Veselinović**	Serbia	2020–	162	6	13	14	5	200
4	Forward	**Brian White**	United States	2021–	136	10	14	15	6	181
5	Defender	Jake Nerwinski	United States	2017–2022	142	4	11	2	0	159
6	Midfielder	Gershon Koffie	Ghana	2011–2015	133	4	13	1	0	151
6	Goalkeeper	David Ousted	Denmark	2013–2017	142	3	2	4	0	151
8	Midfielder	**Ryan Gauld**	Scotland	2021–	114	12	13	8	3	150
9	Forward	Ryan Raposo	Canada	2020–2024	121	3	11	6	5	146
10	Defender	Kendall Waston	Costa Rica	2014–2018	115	6	8	8	0	137

*Includes MLS is Back Tournament CC = Canadian Championship; CCL = CONCACAF Champions League LC = Leagues Cup

=== Youngest Players ===
- (Canada) Alphonso Davies vs. Ottawa Fury FC June 2, 2016 — Aged 15 years 07 months 00 days
- (Canada) Simon Colyn vs. Portland Timbers October 28, 2018 — Aged 16 years 07 months 05 days
- (Canada) Kamron Habibullah vs. Colorado Rapids May 3, 2021 — Aged 17 years 06 months 10 days
- (Canada) Marco Carducci vs. Toronto FC May 8, 2014 — Aged 17 years 07 months 14 days
- (Canada) Max Anchor vs. Charlotte FC May 22, 2022 — Aged 17 years 10 months 01 day

=== Oldest Players ===
- (United States) Joe Cannon vs. LA Galaxy May 12, 2013 — Aged 38 years 04 months 10 days
- (Argentina) Mauro Rosales vs. Seattle Sounders FC September 28, 2017 — Aged 36 years 07 months 04 days
- (South Korea) Young-pyo Lee vs. Colorado Rapids October 28, 2013 — Aged 36 years 06 months 05 days
- (Norway) Pa-Modou Kah vs. Central FC August 3, 2016 — Aged 36 years 00 months 04 days
- (Germany) Thomas Müller vs. Inter Miami CF December 6, 2025 — Aged 36 years 02 months 23 days

=== Top Goalscorers ===
As of December 31, 2025

Bolded players are currently on the Whitecaps FC roster.

#	Pos.	Name	Nation	Career	MLS*	Playoffs	CC	CCL	LC	Total
1	Forward	**Brian White**	United States	2021–	62	4	5	8	1	80
2	Midfielder	**Ryan Gauld**	Scotland	2021–	34	5	5	1	0	45
3	Forward	Camilo	Brazil	2011–2013	39	0	4	0	0	43
4	Midfielder	Pedro Morales	Chile	2014–2016	25	0	4	0	0	29
4	Midfielder	Cristian Techera	Uruguay	2015–2018	23	1	0	5	0	29
6	Forward	Fredy Montero	Colombia	2017, 2019–2020	26	1	0	1	0	28
7	Forward	Kekuta Manneh	Gambia	2013–2017	22	0	1	1	0	24
8	Forward	Darren Mattocks	Jamaica	2012–2015	19	1	2	0	0	22
9	Forward	Yordy Reyna	Peru	2017–2020	20	0	1	0	0	21
10	Forward	Lucas Cavallini	Canada	2020–2022	18	0	0	0	0	18

* Includes MLS is Back Tournament CC = Canadian Championship; CCL = CONCACAF Champions League LC = Leagues Cup

=== Youngest Goalscorers ===
- (Canada) Alphonso Davies vs. Sporting Kansas City September 14, 2016 — Aged 15 years, 10 months, 12 days
- (The Gambia) Kekuta Manneh vs. FC Dallas April 28, 2013 — Aged 18 years, 03 months, 29 days
- (Canada) Kianz Froese vs. New York Red Bulls June 21, 2015 — Aged 19 years 02 months 05 days
- (Canada) Theo Bair vs. Portland Timbers August 11, 2019 — Aged 19 years 11 months 15 days
- (Canada) Russel Teibert vs. LA Galaxy May 12, 2013 — Aged 20 years 04 months 20 days

=== Oldest Goalscorers ===
- (Germany) Thomas Müller vs. FC Dallas September 13, 2025 — Aged 36 years 01 months 13 days
- (Panama) Blas Pérez vs. Central FC September 29, 2016 — Aged 35 years 06 months 16 days
- (Canada) Tosaint Ricketts vs. LA Galaxy September 15, 2022 — Aged 35 years 01 month 09 days
- (Norway) Pa-Modou Kah vs. Real Salt Lake August 9, 2015 — Aged 35 years 00 months 10 days
- (South Korea) Young-pyo Lee vs. Columbus Crew April 29, 2012 — Aged 35 years 00 months 06 days

=== Hat tricks ===
- (The Gambia) Kekuta Manneh vs. Seattle Sounders FC October 9, 2013
- (Brazil) Camilo Sanvezzo vs. Colorado Rapids October 27, 2013
- (Uruguay) Cristian Techera vs. New England Revolution May 26, 2018
- (United States) Brian White vs. San Jose Earthquakes October 2, 2021
- (United States) Brian White vs. St. Louis City SC June 29, 2024
- (Scotland) Ryan Gauld vs. Portland Timbers October 23, 2024
- (Germany) Thomas Müller vs. Philadelphia Union September 13, 2025

=== Hauls ===
- (United States) Brian White vs. Austin FC April 12, 2025

=== Top Assisters ===
As of December 31, 2025

Bolded players are currently on the Whitecaps FC roster.

#	Pos.	Name	Nation	Career	MLS*	Playoffs	CC	CCL	LC	Total
1	Midfielder	**Ryan Gauld**	Scotland	2021–	44	2	3	3	2	54
2	Midfielder	Russell Teibert	Canada	2011–23	21	0	3	1	0	25
3	Midfielder	Pedro Morales	Chile	2014–16	18	0	3	1	0	22
4	Forward	Camilo	Brazil	2011–13	17	0	0	0	0	17
4	Forward	Yordy Reyna	Peru	2017–20	17	0	0	0	0	17
6	Forward	**Brian White**	United States	2021–	14	1	0	1	0	16
7	Forward	Erik Hurtado	United States	2013–18	10	0	2	2	0	14
7	Forward	Alphonso Davies	Canada	2016–18	12	0	1	1	0	14
7	Forward	Christian Bolaños	Costa Rica	2016–17	13	1	0	0	0	14
7	Forward	Christian Dajome	Colombia	2020–23	13	0	1	0	0	14

*Includes MLS is Back Tournament CC = Canadian Championship; CCL = CONCACAF Champions League LC = Leagues Cup

=== Quick Hits ===
As of July 12, 2023

- Most Goals scored in a Match: 4 — Brian White vs. Austin FC April 12, 2025
- Fastest Goal: 00:15 — Pedro Vite vs. Houston Dynamo
- Fastest Second Half Goal: 45:10 — Brian White vs. Houston Dynamo
- Most Penalties Scored: 15 — Pedro Morales
- Most Saves in a Match: 16 — Maxime Crepeau vs. San Jose Earthquake (MLS Record)
- Tallest Player: 6 foot 5 inches (1 metre 96 centimetres) — Kendall Waston and Brian Sylvestre
- Shortest Player: 5 foot 2 inches (1 metre 57 centimetres) — Christian Techera
- Most Yellow Cards: 42 — Kendall Waston
- Fastest Red Card: 12:15 Kendall Waston vs. Atlanta United FC (Later rescinded by panel)
- Most Straight Red Cards: 3 — Kendall Waston and Pedro Morales
- Most Total Red Cards: 5 — Kendall Waston and Matías Laba
- Most Own Goals: 4 — Ranko Veselinović
- Most goals against the Whitecaps: 14 — Chris Wondolowski (30 GP)
- Most goals per game against the Whitecaps: 2 — Josef Martinez (2 GP, 4 G)
- Most assists against the Whitecaps: 8 —Diego Váleri (23 GP)

== Individual honours ==
=== Players Named to MLS Best XI ===
- (Costa Rica) Kendall Waston 2015
- (Costa Rica) Kendall Waston 2017
- (United States) Sebastian Berhalter 2025
- (United States) Tristan Blackmon 2025

=== MLS Goal of the Year Winners ===
- (Brazil) Camilo vs. Portland Timbers Sunday October 6, 2013

=== MLS All-Stars ===
Year	Player	Opposition	Score	Venue
2011	(France) Eric Hassli	(England) Manchester United	0–4	(New Jersey) Red Bull Arena
2012	(United States) Jay DeMerit	(England) Chelsea	3–2	(Pennsylvania) PPL Park (Now Subaru Park)
2013	(Brazil) Camilo	(Italy) Roma	1–3	(Kansas) Sporting Park (Now Children's Mercy Park)
2015	(Denmark) David Ousted	(England) Tottenham Hotspur	2–1	(Colorado) Dick's Sporting Goods Park
2016	(Costa Rica) Kendal Waston	(England) Arsenal	1–2	(California) Avaya Stadium (Now PayPal Park)
2018	(Canada) Alphonso Davies	(Italy) Juventus	1–1 (Penalties 3–5)	(Georgia (U.S. state)) Mercedes Benz Stadium
2024	(Scotland) Ryan Gauld	(Mexico) Liga MX All-Stars	1–4	(Ohio) Lower.com Field
2025	(United States) Sebastian Berhalter	(Mexico) Liga MX All-Stars	3–1	(Texas) Q2 Stadium
2025	(United States) Tristan Blackmon	(Mexico) Liga MX All-Stars	3–1	(Texas) Q2 Stadium
2025	(Japan) Yohei Takaoka	(Mexico) Liga MX All-Stars	3–1	(Texas) Q2 Stadium
2025	(United States) Brian White	(Mexico) Liga MX All-Stars	3–1	(Texas) Q2 Stadium

=== MLS Golden Boot Winners ===
- (Brazil) Camilo 2013

=== MLS Newcomer of the Year Winners ===
- (Chile) Pedro Morales 2014

=== MLS Player of the Month Winners ===
- (Brazil) Camilo October 2013
- (Brazil) Camilo July 2013
- (Uruguay) Octavio Rivero March 2015
- (Denmark) David Ousted June 2015
- (United States) Brian White April 2025

=== George Gross Memorial Trophy Winners ===
The George Gross Memorial Trophy is awarded to the most valuable player of the Canadian Championship

- (Canada) Russel Teibert 2015
- (Scotland) Ryan Gauld 2022
- (United States) Julian Gressel 2023
- (Canada) Isaac Boehmer 2024
- (Canada) Ali Ahmed 2025

=== Best Young Canadian Player Award Winners ===
The Best Young Canadian Player award was created by the Canadian Soccer Association in 2019 to recognize each tournament's best Canadian under-23 player.

- (Canada) Ryan Raposo 2022
- (Canada) Ali Ahmed 2023
- (Canada) Isaac Boehmer 2024
- (Canada) Jayden Nelson 2025

=== Whitecaps Club Award Winners ===
Player of the Year
Year	Player	Position
2025	(United States) Sebastian Berhalter	Midfielder
2024	(Scotland) Ryan Gauld	Midfielder
2023	(Scotland) Ryan Gauld	Midfielder
2022	(Scotland) Ryan Gauld	Midfielder
2021	(Canada) Maxime Crépeau	Goalkeeper
2020	(Iraq) Ali Adnan	Defender
2019	(Canada) Maxime Crépeau	Goalkeeper
2018	(Canada) Alphonso Davies	Forward
2017	(Costa Rica) Kendal Waston	Defender
2016	(United States) Jordan Harvey	Defender
2015	(Costa Rica) Kendal Waston	Defender
2014	(Chile) Pedro Morales	Midfielder
2013	(Brazil) Camilo	Forward
2012	(South Korea) Young-Pyo Lee	Defender
2011	(Brazil) Camilo	Forward

Domenic Mobilio Golden Boot
Year	Player	Goals
2025	(United States) Brian White	16
2024	(United States) Brian White	15
2023	(United States) Brian White	20
2022	(Canada) Lucas Cavallini	9
2021	(United States) Brian White	12
2020	(Canada) Lucas Cavallini	6
2019	(Colombia) Fredy Montero	8
2018	(Sierra Leone) Kei Kamara	17
2017	(Colombia) Fredy Montero	13
2016	(Chile) Pedro Morales	9
2015	(Uruguay) Octavio Rivero	11
2014	(Chile) Pedro Morales	11
2013	(Brazil) Camilo	22
2012	(Jamaica) Darren Mattocks	7
2011	(Brazil) Camilo	12

Most Promising Male Player
Year	Player	Age
2025	(Colombia) Édier Ocampo	22
2024	(Canada) Isaac Boehmer	22
2023	(Canada) Ali Ahmed	23
2022	(Ecuador) Pedro Vite	20
2021	(Colombia) Déiber Caicedo	21
2020	(Serbia) Ranko Veselinović	21
2019	(South Korea) Hwang In-beom	23
2018	(Philippines) Michael Baldisimo	18
2017	(United States) Jake Nerwinski	22
2016	(Canada) Alphonso Davies	15
2015	(Canada) Kianz Froese	19
2014	(Canada) Marco Carducci	18
2013	(Canada) Marco Bustos	17
2012	(Jamaica) Darren Mattocks	22
2011	(Ghana) Gershon Koffie	20

== Coaching records ==
As of December 31, 2025

Coach	From	To	Record				
Coach	From	To	G	W	D	L	Win %
(Iceland) Teitur Thordarson	September 1, 2010	May 30, 2011	15	2	8	5	13.33
(United States) Tom Soehn (interim)	May 30, 2011	October 25, 2011	23	5	4	14	21.74
(Scotland) Martin Rennie	October 26, 2011	October 29, 2013	77	28	22	27	36.36
(Wales) Carl Robinson	December 16, 2013	September 25, 2018	195	76	48	71	38.97
(England) Craig Dalrymple (interim)	September 25, 2018	November 7, 2018	5	2	1	2	40.00
(Canada) Marc Dos Santos	November 7, 2018	August 27, 2021	81	22	20	39	27.16
(Italy) Vanni Sartini	August 27, 2021	November 25, 2024	147	59	38	50	40.14
(Denmark) Jesper Sørensen	January 14, 2025	present	53	26	16	11	49.06
Total			**596**	**220**	**157**	**219**	**36.91**

Oldest coach: (Iceland) Teitur Thordarson (59 years 4 months 16 days)

Youngest coach: (Scotland) Martin Rennie (36 years 5 months 11 days)

Longest Serving coach: (Wales) Carl Robinson (1,744 days)

Shortest Serving coach: (Iceland) Teitur Thordarson (271 days)

== List of seasons ==
Last five seasons
Season	League											Position		Playoffs	CC	Continental		Other	Average attendance	Top goalscorer(s)	
Season	Div	League	Pld	W	L	D	GF	GA	GD	Pts	PPG	Conf.	Overall	Playoffs	CC	CCL	LC	Other	Average attendance	Name(s)	Goals
**2021**	1	MLS	34	12	9	13	45	45	0	49	1.44	6th	12th	R1	R1	DNQ	DNQ	DNE/DNQ	12,492 (Note: Does not include home matches played in American stadiums.)	(Colombia) Cristian Dájome (United States) Brian White	12
**2022**	1	MLS	34	12	15	7	40	57	–17	43	1.26	9th	17th	DNQ	W	DNQ	DNE	DNE/DNQ	18,643	(Canada) Lucas Cavallini	9
**2023**	1	MLS	34	12	10	12	55	48	+7	48	1.41	6th	13th	R1	W	QF	Ro32	DNE/DNQ	16,745	(United States) Brian White	19
**2024**	1	MLS	34	13	13	8	52	49	+3	47	1.38	8th	14th	R1	W	R1	Ro32	DNE/DNQ	26,121	(United States) Brian White	15
**2025**	1	MLS	34	18	7	9	66	38	+28	63	1.85	2nd	5th	RU	W	RU	DNP (Note: VWFC qualified, but did not participate in the 2025 Leagues Cup due to an MLS rule limiting clubs to participating in a maximum of two 2025 cup competitions; VWFC participated in the Canadian Championship and CONCACAF Champions Cup.)	DNE/DNQ	21,806	(United States) Brian White	16

1. Avg. attendance include statistics from league matches only.
2. Top goalscorer(s) includes all goals scored in League, MLS Cup Playoffs, Canadian Championship, MLS is Back Tournament, CONCACAF Champions League, FIFA Club World Cup, and other competitive continental matches.

== MLS Cup playoffs ==
Vancouver Whitecaps FC have qualified for the MLS Cup playoffs on eight occasions. They first qualified in 2012, becoming the first Canadian club to do so.

=== By year ===
Scores and results list Vancouver's goal tally first
Season	Rank	Round	Opponent		Format	Result	Notes
2012	W5	Knockout round	W4	LA Galaxy	Single match	Lost: 1–2	
2014	W5	Knockout round	W4	FC Dallas	Single match	Lost: 1–2	
2015	W2	Conference semifinals	W3	Portland Timbers	Two-legged tie	Lost: 0–2 (aggr.)	G1: 0–0 (A), G2: 0–2 (H)
2017	W3	Knockout round	W6	San Jose Earthquakes	Single match	Won: 5–0	
2017	W3	Conference semifinals	W2	Seattle Sounders FC	Two-legged tie	Lost: 0–2 (aggr.)	G1: 0–0 (H), G2: 0–2 (A)
2021	W6	First round	W3	Sporting Kansas City	Single match	Lost: 1–3	
2023	W6	Round One	W3	Los Angeles FC	Best-of-3 series	Lost: 0–2 (best-of-3)	G1: 2–5 (A), G2: 0–1 (H)
2024	W8	Wild card	W9	Portland Timbers	Single match	Won: 5–0 (Note: Due to a scheduling conflict at BC Place, the Whitecaps served as the home team for a game played at Providence Park.)	
2024	W8	Round one	W1	Los Angeles FC	Best-of-3 series	Lost: 1–2 (best-of-3)	G1: 1–2 (A), G2: 3–0 (H), G3: 0–1 (A)
2025	W2	Round one	W7	FC Dallas	Best-of-3 series	Won: 2–0 (best-of-3)	G1: 3–0 (H), G2: 1–1 (4–2p) (A)
2025	W2	Conference semifinals	W3	Los Angeles FC	Single match	Won: 2–2 (a.e.t.; 4–3p)	
2025	W2	Conference finals	W1	San Diego FC	Single match	Won: 3–1	
2025	W2	MLS Cup	E3	Inter Miami CF	Single match	Lost: 1–3	

=== By opponent ===
As of December 31, 2025

Opponent	Series			Match statistics						
Opponent	Pld	W	L	Pld	W	D	L	GF	GA	GD
LA Galaxy	1	0	1	1	0	0	1	1	2	–1
FC Dallas	2	1	1	3	1	1	1	5	3	+2
Portland Timbers	2	1	1	3	1	1	1	5	2	+3
San Jose Earthquakes	1	1	0	1	1	0	0	5	0	+5
Seattle Sounders FC	1	0	1	2	0	1	1	0	2	–2
Sporting Kansas City	1	0	1	1	0	0	1	1	3	–2
Los Angeles FC	3	1	2	6	1	1	4	8	11	–3
San Diego FC	1	1	0	1	1	0	0	3	1	+2
Inter Miami CF	1	0	1	1	0	0	1	1	3	–2
Total	13	5	8	19	5	4	10	29	27	+2

== International competition ==
=== CONCACAF Champions League/Cup ===
==== By year ====
Scores and results list Vancouver's goal tally first
Season	Round	Opponent	Home	Away	Aggregate
2015–16	Group stage	(United States) Seattle Sounders FC	1–1	0–3	3rd (Note: Final position in group.)
2015–16	Group stage	(Honduras) Olimpia	1–0	0–1	3rd
2016–17	Group stage	(Trinidad and Tobago) Central F.C.	4–1	1–0	1st
2016–17	Group stage	(United States) Sporting Kansas City	3–0	2–1	1st
2016–17	Quarterfinals	(United States) New York Red Bulls	2–0	1–1	3–1
2016–17	Semifinals	(Mexico) UANL	1–2	0–2	1–4
2023	Round of 16	(Honduras) Real España	5–0	2–3	7–3
2023	Quarter-finals	(United States) Los Angeles FC	0–3	0–3	0–6
2024	Round one	(Mexico) UANL	1–1	0–3	1–4
2025	Round one	(Costa Rica) Saprissa	2–0	1–2	3–2
2025	Round of 16	(Mexico) C.F. Monterrey	1–1	2–2	3–3 (Note: Won on away goals)
2025	Quarter-finals	(Mexico) UNAM	1–1	2–2	3–3
2025	Semi-finals	(United States) Inter Miami CF	2–0	3–1	5–1
2025	Final	(Mexico) Cruz Azul	—N/a	0–5	0–5
2026	Round one	(Costa Rica) Cartaginés	2–0	0–0	2–0
2026	Round of 16	(United States) Seattle Sounders FC	0–3	1–2	1–5

==== By opponent ====
As of March 18, 2026

Club	Pld	W	D	L	GF	GA	GD
(United States) Seattle Sounders FC	4	0	1	3	2	9	–7
(Honduras) Olimpia	2	1	0	1	1	1	0
(Trinidad and Tobago) Central F.C.	2	2	0	0	5	1	+4
(United States) Sporting Kansas City	2	2	0	0	5	1	+4
(United States) New York Red Bulls	2	1	1	0	3	1	+2
(Mexico) UANL	4	0	1	3	2	8	–6
(Honduras) Real España	2	1	0	1	7	3	+4
(United States) Los Angeles FC	2	0	0	2	0	6	–6
(Costa Rica) Saprissa	2	1	0	1	3	2	+1
(Mexico) C.F. Monterrey	2	0	2	0	3	3	0
(Mexico) UNAM	2	0	2	0	3	3	0
(United States) Inter Miami CF	2	2	0	0	5	1	+4
(Mexico) Cruz Azul	1	0	0	1	0	5	–5
(Costa Rica) Cartaginés	2	1	1	0	2	0	+2
Total	31	11	8	12	41	44	–3

Note: Draws include matches that were decided by penalty shoot-outs.

=== Leagues Cup ===
==== By year ====
Scores and results list Vancouver's goal tally first
Season	Round	Club	Result
2023	Group stage	(Mexico) Club León	1–1 (15–16 p.) (H)
2023	Group stage	(United States) LA Galaxy	2–1 (A)
2023	Round of 32	(Mexico) UANL	1–1 (3–5 p.) (H)
2024	Group stage	(United States) Los Angeles FC	2–2 (4–2 p.) (A)
2024	Group stage	(Mexico) Tijuana	3–1 (H)
2024	Round of 32	(Mexico) UNAM	0–2 (H)
2026	League phase	(Mexico) Atlante	0–1 (H)
2026	League phase	(Mexico) Juárez	1–3 (H)
2026	League phase	(Mexico) UANL	1–1 (4–5 p.) (A)

==== By opponent ====
As of August 11, 2026

Club	Pld	W	PKW	PKL	L	GF	GA	GD
(Mexico) Club León	1	0	0	1	0	1	1	0
(United States) LA Galaxy	1	1	0	0	0	2	1	+1
(Mexico) UANL	2	0	0	2	0	2	2	0
(United States) Los Angeles FC	1	0	1	0	0	2	2	0
(Mexico) Tijuana	1	1	0	0	0	3	1	+2
(Mexico) UNAM	1	0	0	0	1	0	2	–2
(Mexico) Atlante	1	0	0	0	1	0	1	–1
(Mexico) Juárez	1	0	0	0	1	1	3	–2
Total	9	2	1	3	3	11	13	–2

=== All-time record vs. international opponents ===
==== By club ====
As of August 11, 2026

Club	Pld	W	D	L	GF	GA	GD
(United States) Seattle Sounders FC	4	0	1	3	2	9	–7
(Honduras) Olimpia	2	1	0	1	1	1	0
(Trinidad and Tobago) Central F.C.	2	2	0	0	5	1	+4
(United States) Sporting Kansas City	2	2	0	0	5	1	+4
(United States) New York Red Bulls	2	1	1	0	3	1	+2
(Mexico) UANL	6	0	3	3	4	10	–6
(Honduras) Real España	2	1	0	1	7	3	+4
(United States) Los Angeles FC	3	0	1	2	2	8	–6
(Mexico) Club León	1	0	1	0	1	1	0
(United States) LA Galaxy	1	1	0	0	2	1	+1
(Mexico) Tijuana	1	1	0	0	3	1	+2
(Mexico) UNAM	3	0	2	1	3	5	–2
(Costa Rica) Saprissa	2	1	0	1	3	2	+1
(Mexico) C.F. Monterrey	2	0	2	0	3	3	0
(United States) Inter Miami CF	2	2	0	0	5	1	+4
(Mexico) Cruz Azul	1	0	0	1	0	5	–5
(Costa Rica) Cartaginés	2	1	1	0	2	0	+2
(Mexico) Atlante	1	0	0	1	0	1	–1
(Mexico) Juárez	1	0	0	1	1	3	–2
Total	40	13	12	15	52	57	–5

Note: Draws include matches that were decided by penalty shoot-outs.

==== By country ====
As of August 11, 2026

Opponent's country	Pld	W	D	L	GF	GA	GD
Honduras	4	2	0	2	8	4	+4
Mexico	16	1	8	7	15	29	–14
Trinidad and Tobago	2	2	0	0	5	1	+4
United States	14	6	3	5	19	21	–2
Costa Rica	4	2	1	1	5	2	+3
Total	40	13	12	15	52	57	–5

Note: Draws include matches that were decided by penalty shoot-outs.

== MLS single season records ==
=== Regular season ===
==== Team ====
- Best result (conference): 1st in 2026
- Best result (overall): 2nd in 2026
- Most wins by team: 19 in 2026
- Most losses by team: 18 in 2011
- Most points by team: 64 in 2026
- Most goals by team: 74 in 2026
- Fewest goals by team: 35 in 2011, 2012
- Most goals against by team: 67 in 2018
- Fewest goals against by team: 34 in 2026
- Longest win streak: 4 in 2015, 2021, 2025 and 2026
- Longest unbeaten streak: 11 in 2025
- Longest losing streak: 5 in 2012, 2019, and 2021
- Longest winless streak: 14 in 2011

==== Players ====
- Most goals: **Camilo**, 22 (2013)
- Most assists: **Pedro Morales**, 12 (2014)
- Most shots: **Camilo**, 123 (2013)
- Most shots on goal: **Camilo**, 55 (2013)

==== Goalkeepers ====
- Most wins: **Yohei Takaoka**, 18 (2025)
- Most clean sheets: **Yohei Takaoka**, 14 (2026)
- Most saves: Maxime Crépeau, 114 (2019)

== See also ==
- List of Vancouver Whitecaps FC players
