= Andrés Ayala =

Andrés Ayala may refer to:

- Andrés Ayala (footballer, born 1989), Uruguayan defender
- Andrés Ayala (footballer, born 2000), Argentine defensive midfielder
