= 2024 Vancouver Whitecaps FC season =

Vancouver Whitecaps FC 2024 soccer season

Vancouver Whitecaps FC
- Chairman: Jeff Mallett
- Head coach: Vanni Sartini
- Stadium: BC Place (Vancouver, BC)
- Major League Soccer: Conference: 8th; Overall: 14th
- MLS Cup playoffs: Round one
- Canadian Championship: Winners
- CONCACAF Champions Cup: Round one
- Leagues Cup: Round of 32
- Top goalscorer: League: Brian White (15); All: Ryan Gauld (17)
- Highest home attendance: League/All: 51,035; May 25 vs. Inter Miami CF
- Lowest home attendance: League/All: 5,763; February 7 vs. Tigres UANL (Note: Match could not be played at BC Place due to scheduling conflicts.)
- Average home league attendance: 26,121
Home colours	Away colours

The 2024 Vancouver Whitecaps FC season was the club's fourteenth season in Major League Soccer, the top division of soccer in the United States and Canada. Including previous iterations of the franchise, this was the 47th season of professional soccer being played in Vancouver under a variation of the "Whitecaps" name.

Having won the 2023 Canadian Championship, the Whitecaps participated in the CONCACAF Champions League for a second consecutive season and fourth time overall. The Whitecaps also participated in the 2024 Canadian Championship looking to win their third domestic cup championship in a row. They also participated in the 2024 Leagues Cup.

The Whitecaps had to play their first six regular season matches without their manager Vanni Sartini, due to him being sent off and suspended for multiple league rules violations during the Whitecaps' last match of the 2023 season.

== Roster ==
As of September 13, 2024

No.	Player	Nationality	Position	Date of birth (age)	Previous club
Goalkeepers
1	Yohei Takaoka	(Japan)	GK	March 16, 1996 (age 30)	(Japan) Yokohama F. Marinos
17	Joe Bendik	(United States)	GK	April 29, 1989 (age 37)	(United States) Philadelphia Union
32	Isaac Boehmer	(Canada)	GK	November 20, 2001 (age 24)	(Canada) Vancouver Whitecaps Development Squad
50	Max Anchor	(Canada)	GK	July 21, 2004 (age 22)	(Canada) Whitecaps FC 2
Defenders
2	Mathías Laborda	(Uruguay)	DF	September 15, 1999 (age 27)	(Uruguay) Nacional
3	Sam Adekugbe	(Canada)	DF	January 16, 1995 (age 31)	(Turkey) Hatayspor
4	Ranko Veselinović	(Serbia)	DF	March 24, 1999 (age 27)	(Serbia) Vojvodina
6	Tristan Blackmon	(United States)	DF	August 12, 1996 (age 30)	(United States) Charlotte FC
7	Ryan Raposo	(Canada)	DF	March 5, 1999 (age 27)	(United States) Syracuse Orange
12	Belal Halbouni	(Syria)	DF	December 29, 1999 (age 26)	(Germany) FC Magdeburg
15	Bjørn Inge Utvik	(Norway)	DF	February 28, 1996 (age 30)	(Norway) Sarpsborg
18	Édier Ocampo	(Colombia)	DF	October 3, 2003 (age 23)	(Colombia) Atlético Nacional
27	Giuseppe Bovalina	(Australia)	DF	November 11, 2004 (age 22)	(Australia) Adelaide United
Midfielders
8	Alessandro Schöpf	(Austria)	MF	February 7, 1994 (age 32)	(Germany) Arminia Bielefeld
13	Ralph Priso	(Canada)	MF	August 2, 2002 (age 24)	(United States) Colorado Rapids
16	Sebastian Berhalter	(United States)	MF	May 10, 2001 (age 25)	(United States) Columbus Crew
19	Damir Kreilach	(Croatia)	MF	April 16, 1989 (age 37)	(United States) Real Salt Lake
20	Andrés Cubas	(Paraguay)	MF	May 22, 1996 (age 30)	(France) Nîmes
22	Ali Ahmed	(Canada)	MF	October 10, 2000 (age 26)	(Canada) Whitecaps FC 2
25	Ryan Gauld	(Scotland)	MF	December 16, 1995 (age 30)	(Portugal) Farense
26	Stuart Armstrong	(Scotland)	MF	March 30, 1992 (age 34)	(England) Southampton
45	Pedro Vite	(Ecuador)	MF	March 9, 2002 (age 24)	(Ecuador) Independiente del Valle
59	Jeevan Badwal	(Canada)	MF	March 11, 2006 (age 20)	(Canada) Whitecaps FC 2
Forwards
11	Fafà Picault	(Haiti)	FW	February 23, 1991 (age 35)	(United States) Nashville SC
23	Déiber Caicedo	(Colombia)	FW	March 25, 2000 (age 26)	(Colombia) Deportivo Cali
24	Brian White	(United States)	FW	February 3, 1996 (age 30)	(United States) New York Red Bulls
28	Levonte Johnson	(Canada)	FW	March 15, 1999 (age 27)	(Canada) Whitecaps FC 2
52	Nicolas Fleuriau Chateau	(Canada)	FW	May 21, 2002 (age 24)	(Canada) Whitecaps FC 2
Out on Loan
26	J.C. Ngando	(Cameroon)	MF	November 20, 1999 (age 26)	(United States) UNC Greensboro Spartans

== Transfers ==
=== In ===
==== Transferred in ====
#	Position	Player	Transferred from	Fee/notes	Date	Source
19	MF	(Croatia) Damir Kreilach	(United States) Real Salt Lake	Free	December 29, 2023	
11	FW	(Haiti) Fafà Picault	(United States) Nashville SC	Free	January 11, 2024	
15	DF	(Norway) Bjørn Inge Utvik	(Norway) Sarpsborg	Free	January 30, 2024	
12	DF	(Syria) Belal Halbouni	(Germany) FC Magdeburg	Undisclosed	February 5, 2024	
17	GK	(United States) Joe Bendik	(United States) Philadelphia Union	Free	February 17, 2024	
13	MF	(Canada) Ralph Priso	(United States) Colorado Rapids	Up to $150,000 GAM, first and third-round pick in the 2025 MLS SuperDraft	March 12, 2024	
27	DF	(Australia) Giuseppe Bovalina	(Australia) Adelaide United	Undisclosed	April 23, 2024	
18	DF	(Colombia) Édier Ocampo	(Colombia) Atlético Nacional	Undisclosed	August 8, 2024	
26	MF	(Scotland) Stuart Armstrong	(England) Southampton	Free/Designated Player	September 3, 2024	
52	FW	(Canada) Nicolas Fleuriau Chateau	(Canada) Whitecaps FC 2	Free	September 13, 2024	
59	MF	(Canada) Jeevan Badwal	(Canada) Whitecaps FC 2	Homegrown player	September 13, 2024	

==== Loans in ====
#	Position	Player	Loaned from	Date	Loan expires	Notes	Source

=== Out ===
==== Transferred out ====
#	Position	Player	Transferred to	Fee/notes	Date	Source
1	GK	(Canada) Thomas Hasal	(United States) LAFC	Option declined	November 10, 2023	
11	FW	(Canada) Junior Hoilett	(Scotland) Aberdeen	Out of contract	November 10, 2023	
30	MF	(Canada) Kamron Habibullah	(United States) Sporting Kansas City II	Option declined	November 10, 2023	
61	DF	(Canada) Matteo Campagna	(Canada) Vancouver FC	Option declined	November 10, 2023	
12	DF	(Canada) Karifa Yao	(United States) Rhode Island FC	Option declined	November 17, 2023	
31	MF	(Canada) Russell Teibert	Retired	Option declined	December 1, 2023	
29	FW	(United States) Simon Becher	(Denmark) AC Horsens	Undisclosed	January 17, 2024	
8	MF	(Brazil) Caio Alexandre	(Brazil) Fortaleza	Undisclosed	January 20, 2024	
23	DF	(Jamaica) Javain Brown	(United States) Real Salt Lake	Waived	July 29, 2024	
14	DF	(Portugal) Luís Martins		Contract buyout	September 2, 2024	

==== Loans out ====
#	Position	Player	Loaned to	Date	Loan expires	Source
26	MF	(Cameroon) J.C. Ngando	(United States) Las Vegas Lights FC	March 5, 2024	December 31, 2024	

=== MLS SuperDraft picks ===
Round	No.	Pos.	Player	College/Club team	Transaction	Source
2 (45)		DF	(England) Eliot Goldthorp	(United States) Hofstra	Signed with Whitecaps FC 2	
3 (74)		FW	(Canada) Nicolas Fleuriau Chateau	(United States) St. John's	Signed with Whitecaps FC 2	

== Preseason and Friendlies ==
January 20	Whitecaps FC	1–0	Diósgyőri VTK	Marbella, Spain
2:30 AM (PST)	Laborda (yellow card) 25'; Wright (yellow card) 63'; Chateau 65'; Brown (yellow card) 78'	Report	Lund (yellow card) 63'	Stadium: Marbella Football Center

January 22	Whitecaps FC	0–2	Puskás Akadémia	Marbella, Spain
5:30 AM (PST)		Report	81'; 83'	Stadium: Marbella Football Center

January 27	Whitecaps FC	1–2	TSC	Marbella, Spain
5:00 AM (PST)	White	Report	83'; 89'	Stadium: Marbella Football Center

January 30	Whitecaps FC	1–1	FK Haugesund	Marbella, Spain
5:00 AM (PST)	Picault 54' (White)	Report	Selvik (red card) 35'; 87' (pen.)	Stadium: Marbella Football Center

February 17	Whitecaps FC	1–1	San Jose Earthquakes	Indio, California
(PST)	Ngando 19'	Report	Beason 16'; (yellow card) 21'	Stadium: Empire Polo Club

February 21	Whitecaps FC	0–0	Orange County SC	Indio, California
(PST)		Report	(yellow card) 20'	Stadium: Empire Polo Club

July 27	Whitecaps FC	1–4	Wrexham	Vancouver, British Columbia
4:30 PM (PDT)	Sartini (yellow card) 32'; Ahmed (yellow card) 33'; Bovalina 55'; Goldthorp (yellow card) 74'; Priso (yellow card) 81'	Report	Revan 31'; Lee (yellow card) 43' (goal) 71'; McClean 68'; Davies 83'; James (yellow card) 90+1'; Bolton (yellow card) 90+2'	Stadium: BC Place; Attendance: 34,738; Referee: Pierre-Luc Lauziere

== Competition overview ==
Competition	First match	Last match	Starting round	Final position	Record							
Competition	First match	Last match	Starting round	Final position	Pld	W	D	L	GF	GA	GD	Win %
Major League Soccer	March 2	November 8	Matchday 1	Playoffs - Round One	38	15	8	15	61	52	+9	39.47
Canadian Championship	May 7	September 25	Quarterfinals	Winners	5	3	1	1	4	2	+2	60.00
CONCACAF Champions Cup	February 7	February 14	Round One	Round One	2	0	1	1	1	4	−3	0.00
Leagues Cup	July 30	August 7	Group Stage	Round of 32	3	1	1	1	5	5	+0	33.33
Total					48	19	11	18	71	63	+8	39.58

Last updated: November 9, 2024
Source: Competitions

== Major League Soccer ==
=== Regular season ===
==== League tables ====
===== Western Conference =====
MLS Western Conference table (2024)
Pos	Team	Pld	W	L	T	GF	GA	GD	Pts	Qualification
6	Minnesota United FC	34	15	12	7	58	49	+9	52	Qualification for round one and the Leagues Cup
7	Colorado Rapids	34	15	14	5	61	60	+1	50	Qualification for round one and the Leagues Cup
8	Vancouver Whitecaps FC	34	13	13	8	52	49	+3	47	Qualification for the wild card round (Note: Vancouver Whitecaps FC did not qualify for the Leagues Cup due to winning the 2024 Canadian Championship, giving them a place in the 2025 CONCACAF Champions Cup. As MLS teams could participate in no more than two cup competitions, their spot in the Leagues Cup was given to San Diego FC.)
9	Portland Timbers	34	12	11	11	65	56	+9	47	Qualification for the wild card round and the Leagues Cup
10	Austin FC	34	11	14	9	39	48	−9	42	

Source: MLS
Rules for classification: 1) points; 2) total wins; 3) total goal differential; 4) total goals scored; 5) fewer disciplinary points; 6) away goal differential; 7) away goals scored; 8) home goals differential; 9) home goals scored; 10) coin toss (2 clubs tied) or drawing of lots (≥3 clubs tied)

===== Overall =====
Overall MLS standings table
Pos	Team	Pld	W	L	T	GF	GA	GD	Pts	Qualification
12	Colorado Rapids	34	15	14	5	61	60	+1	50	Qualification for the CONCACAF Champions Cup round one (Note: As third place of Leagues Cup)
13	New York City FC	34	14	12	8	54	49	+5	50	Qualification for the U.S. Open Cup round of 32 (Note: As one of the best U.S. teams in the overall table to not qualify for the 2025 CONCACAF Champions Cup)
14	Vancouver Whitecaps FC (V)	34	13	13	8	52	49	+3	47	Qualification for the CONCACAF Champions Cup round one (Note: As winners of Canadian Championship)
15	Portland Timbers	34	12	11	11	65	56	+9	47	Qualification for the U.S. Open Cup round of 32
16	New York Red Bulls	34	11	9	14	55	50	+5	47	Qualification for the U.S. Open Cup round of 32

Source: MLS
Rules for classification: 1) points; 2) total wins; 3) total goal differential; 4) total goals scored; 5) fewer disciplinary points; 6) away goal differential; 7) away goals scored; 8) home goals differential; 9) home goals scored; 10) coin toss (2 clubs tied) or drawing of lots (≥3 clubs tied)
(V) Canadian Championship winners

==== Results ====
Overall								Home						Away					
Pld	Pts	W	L	T	GF	GA	GD	W	L	T	GF	GA	GD	W	L	T	GF	GA	GD
34	47	13	13	8	52	49	+3	6	7	4	26	26	0	7	6	4	26	23	+3

Last updated: October 21, 2024
Pld = Matches played; Pts = Points; W = Matches won; T = Matches tied; L = Matches lost; GF = Goals for; GA = Goals against; GD = Goal difference

Round	1	2	3	4	5	6	7	8	9	10	11	12	13	14	15	16	17	18	19	20	21	22	23	24	25	26	27	28	29	30	31	32	33	34
Ground	H	A	A	H	H	H	H	A	A	H	A	A	A	H	A	H	A	A	H	A	A	A	H	H	H	A	H	H	A	A	H	H	H	A
Result	D	W	W	L	W	W	L	W	D	D	L	L	D	L	W	W	L	L	W	W	D	W	W	L	W	D	W	D	L	D	L	L	L	L
Position (West)	9	5	2	3	2	1	2	2	3	4	4	7	7	7	6	5	5	9	8	5	6	6	4	5	5	6	6	6	7	7	7	8	8	8

A = Away; H = Home; N = Neutral; W = Win; D = Draw; L = Loss; = Conference leader; = Playoffs berth; = Wild card berth

==== Matches ====
March 2 1	Whitecaps FC	1–1	Charlotte FC	Vancouver, British Columbia
4:00 PM	Raposo 45+5'; Cubas (yellow card) 57'; Blackmon (yellow card) 61'	Report	Tavares 25' (yellow card) 79'; Westwood (yellow card) 44'	Stadium: BC Place; Attendance: 29,624; Referee: Scott Bowman

March 9 2	San Jose Earthquakes	0–2	Whitecaps FC	San Jose, California
7:30 PM	Wilson (yellow card) 62'; Judd (yellow card) 73'; Morales (yellow card) 80'; Thompson (yellow card) 90+3'	Report	Schöpf 74'; Picault (yellow card) 80'; Ahmed 86'	Stadium: PayPal Park; Attendance: 16,045; Referee: Christopher Calderon

March 16 3	FC Dallas	1–3	Whitecaps FC	Frisco, Texas
5:30 PM	Lletget 40'	Report	Laborda 25'; White 29'; Gauld (yellow card) 32'; Picault 43'	Stadium: Toyota Stadium; Attendance: 19,096; Referee: Jonathan Weiner

March 23 4	Whitecaps FC	1–2	Real Salt Lake	Vancouver, British Columbia
4:30 PM	Kreilach 33'	Report	Katranis (yellow card) 47', (goal) 76'; Julio 70'; Vera (yellow card) 90+7'; MacMath (yellow card) 90+10'	Stadium: BC Place; Attendance: 22,178; Referee: Chris Grabas

March 30 5 – Cascadia Cup	Whitecaps FC	3–2	Portland Timbers	Vancouver, British Columbia
7:30 PM	Gauld 2'; Picault 29'; Cubas (yellow card) 51'; Raposo 87'; Adekugbe (yellow card) 90'	Report	Evander 52'; Mora 78'	Stadium: BC Place; Attendance: 24,693; Referee: Allen Chapman

April 6 6	Whitecaps FC	4–0	Toronto FC	Vancouver, British Columbia
4:30 PM	White 6'; Picault 29'; Cubas (yellow card) 53'; Gauld 81'; Schöpf (yellow card) 83'; Veselinović 89'	Report	Spicer (yellow card) 45'; Flores (yellow card) 54'; Coello (yellow card) 69'; Long (yellow card) 78'; Bernardeschi (yellow card) 90+6'	Stadium: BC Place; Attendance: 24,678; Referee: Ramy Touchan

April 13 7	Whitecaps FC	1–3	LA Galaxy	Vancouver, British Columbia
7:30 PM	Cubas (yellow card) 20'; Veselinović (yellow card) 45+2'; Ahmed (yellow card) 54'; White 77', (yellow card) 85'	Report	Yamane (yellow card) 25'; Joveljić 56'; Paintsil 80'; Fagúndez 82'	Stadium: BC Place; Attendance: 25,026; Referee: Ismir Pekmic

April 20 8 – Cascadia Cup	Seattle Sounders FC	0–2	Whitecaps FC	Seattle, Washington
7:30 PM	Ragen (red card) 43'; Musovski (yellow card) 70'; Roldan (red card) 75'	Report	Veselinović (yellow card) 45+6'; Gauld 58'; White 71' (yellow card) 79'; Cubas (yellow card) 85'	Stadium: Lumen Field; Attendance: 30,550; Referee: Ramy Touchan

April 27 9	New York Red Bulls	1–1	Whitecaps FC	Harrison, New Jersey
4:30 PM	Vanzeir (yellow card) 34'; Carmona (yellow card) 43'; Morgan 56'; Edelman (yellow card) 58'; Eile (red card) 74'; Nealis (yellow card) 90+1'	Report	White 15'; Adekugbe (yellow card) 22'; Raposo (yellow card) 45+3'; Laborda (yellow card) 71'	Stadium: Red Bull Arena; Attendance: 17,525; Referee: Mark Allatin

May 4 10	Whitecaps FC	0–0	Austin FC	Vancouver, British Columbia
7:30 PM	Picault (yellow card) 45+9'; White (yellow card) 46'	Report	Biro (yellow card) 45+9'; Driussi (yellow card) 46'	Stadium: BC Place; Attendance: 32,465; Referee: Marcos DeOliveira II

May 11 11	Los Angeles FC	3–0	Whitecaps FC	Los Angeles, California
7:30 PM	Olivera 18', 36'; Bogusz (yellow card) 45+2', (goal) 57'	Report	White (yellow card) 21'	Stadium: BMO Stadium; Attendance: 22,099; Referee: Ted Unkel

May 15 12	Colorado Rapids	1–0	Whitecaps FC	Commerce City, Colorado
6:30 PM	Navarro 45+5'	Report	Utvik (red card) 45+4'	Stadium: Dick's Sporting Goods Park; Attendance: 11,190; Referee: Alexis Da Silva

May 18 13 – Cascadia Cup	Seattle Sounders FC	1–1	Whitecaps FC	Seattle, Washington
7:30 PM	Morris 9'; Vargas (yellow card) 36'; Paulo (yellow card) 43'; Nouhou (yellow card) 89' (yellow-red card) 90+4'	Report	Laborda (yellow card) 77'; Gauld 90+5'	Stadium: Lumen Field; Attendance: 30,102; Referee: Victor Rivas

May 25 14	Whitecaps FC	1–2	Inter Miami CF	Vancouver, British Columbia
7:30 PM	Ahmed (yellow card) 34'; Gauld 72'; Schöpf (yellow card) 73'; Picault (yellow card) 90'	Report	Alba (yellow card) 20'; Taylor 38'; Bright (yellow card) 48'; Campana 54'; Weigandt (yellow card) 60'; Avilés (yellow card) 63'; Redondo (yellow card) 90'	Stadium: BC Place; Attendance: 51,035; Referee: Joe Dickerson

May 29 15	Sporting Kansas City	1–2	Whitecaps FC	Kansas City, Kansas
5:30 PM	Shelton (yellow card) 43'; Castellanos (yellow card) 75'; Tzionis 90+2'	Report	Utvik (yellow card) 7'; Gauld 39', 82'	Stadium: Children's Mercy Park; Attendance: 17,046; Referee: Rosendo Mendoza

June 1 16	Whitecaps FC	2–1	Colorado Rapids	Vancouver, British Columbia
7:30 PM	Blackmon (yellow card) 9'; Berhalter 46'; Gauld (yellow card) 69'; Kreilach 90+1'	Report	Yapi (yellow card) 20'; Maxsø (yellow card) 45'; Mihailovic 50'	Stadium: BC Place; Attendance: 22,979; Referee: Michael Venne

June 15 17	New England Revolution	3–2	Whitecaps FC	Foxborough, Massachusetts
4:30 PM	Buck 7'; Veioni 21'; Arreaga (yellow card) 29'; Bajraktarević 39'	Report	Gauld 13', 90+4'; Picault (yellow card) 89'; Berhalter (yellow card) 90+2'	Stadium: Gillette Stadium; Attendance: 27,028; Referee: Natalie Simon

June 22 18 – Cascadia Cup	Portland Timbers	2–0	Whitecaps FC	Portland, Oregon
7:30 PM	Rodríguez 26'; Mora 43'; Ayala (yellow card) 55'	Report	Schöpf (yellow card) 34' (red card) 52'; Blackmon (yellow card) 39'; Berhalter (yellow card) 60'	Stadium: Providence Park; Attendance: 22,471; Referee: Ted Unkel

June 29 19	Whitecaps FC	4–3	St. Louis City SC	Vancouver, British Columbia
7:30 PM	Brown (yellow card) 12'; White 37', 54', 61'; Picault 90'	Report	Blo 7'; Löwen 12'; Markanich (yellow card) 26'; Nerwinski (yellow card) 49'; Þórisson 90+3'	Stadium: BC Place; Attendance: 24,662; Referee: Mark Allatin

July 3 20	Minnesota United FC	1–3	Whitecaps FC	Saint Paul, Minnesota
5:30 PM	Jeong (yellow card) 13'; Bran (yellow card) 23'; Hlongwane 30'; Boxall (yellow card) 39'; Adebayo-Smith (yellow card) 90+6'	Report	White 4' (yellow card) 28'; Laborda 17', (yellow card) 81'; Gauld (yellow card) 45+4'; Berhalter 60'	Stadium: Allianz Field; Attendance: 19,684; Referee: Victor Rivas

July 6 21	CF Montréal	1–1	Whitecaps FC	Montreal, Quebec
4:30 PM	Edwards (yellow card) 22'; Cóccaro 79'	Report	White 29'; Raposo (yellow card) 89'	Stadium: Saputo Stadium; Attendance: 19,619; Referee: Guido Gonzales Jr.

July 13 22	St. Louis City SC	1–4	Whitecaps FC	St. Louis, Missouri
5:30 PM	Blom (yellow card) 19'; Þórisson 28'; Reid (yellow card) 53'; Durkin (yellow card) 71'	Report	White 9', 44'; Berhalter (yellow card) 45+7'; Raposo 63'; Cubas (yellow card) 88'; Picault 90+2'; Johnson (yellow card) 90+6'	Stadium: CityPark; Attendance: 22,500; Referee: Pierre-Luc Lauziere

July 17 23	Whitecaps FC	2–1	Sporting Kansas City	Vancouver, British Columbia
7:30 PM	Voloder 34' (o.g.); Picault 76'	Report	Agada 69'; Voloder (yellow card) 87'	Stadium: BC Place; Attendance: 23,198; Referee: Marcos De Oliveira

July 20 24	Whitecaps FC	3–4	Houston Dynamo FC	Vancouver, British Columbia
7:30 PM	Picault 48', 66'; Cubas (yellow card) 45+3'; Veselinović 54'	Report	Artur (yellow card) 20'; Carrasquilla 29'; Dorsey 36', 87'; Escobar (yellow card) 76'; Smith 78' (yellow card) 90+3'	Stadium: BC Place; Attendance: 24,114; Referee: Fotis Bazakos

August 31 26	Austin FC	0–1	Whitecaps FC	Austin, Texas
5:30 PM	Hedges (yellow card) 8'; Bukari (yellow card) 87'; Biro (yellow card) 90+9'	Report	Vite 70'; Takaoka (yellow card) 90+8'; Picault (yellow card) 90+10'	Stadium: Q2 Stadium; Attendance: 20,738; Referee: Mark Allatin

September 7 27	Whitecaps FC	0–0	FC Dallas	Vancouver, British Columbia
7:30 PM	Fleuriau Chateau (yellow card) 83'	Report	Farfan (yellow card) 87'	Stadium: BC Place; Attendance: 23,188; Referee: Allen Chapman

September 14 28	Whitecaps FC	2–0	San Jose Earthquakes	Vancouver, British Columbia
7:30 PM	Picault 35'; Priso (yellow card) 41'; Armstrong 86'	Report	Akapo (yellow card) 26'; Skahan (yellow card) 89'	Stadium: BC Place; Attendance: 21,309; Referee: Lukasz Szpala

September 18 29	Houston Dynamo FC	1–1	Whitecaps FC	Houston, Texas
5:30 PM	Sviatchenko (yellow card) 38'; Ponce 45+7' (pen.); Micael (yellow card) 57'; Bassi (yellow card) 90+4'	Report	Vite (yellow card) 26'; Takaoka (yellow card) 37'; White 73'	Stadium: Shell Energy Stadium; Attendance: 14,282; Referee: Alexis Da Silva

September 21 30	LA Galaxy	4–2	Whitecaps FC	Carson, California
7:30 PM	Pec 32'; Berhalter 50' (o.g.); Paintsil 69'; Puig 90+3'	Report	Berhalter (yellow card) 8'; White 63'; Armstrong (yellow card) 85'; Vite (yellow card) 88'; Adekugbe 90+7'	Stadium: Dignity Health Sports Park; Attendance: 25,387; Referee: Jair Marrufo

September 28 31 – Cascadia Cup	Whitecaps FC	1–1	Portland Timbers	Vancouver, British Columbia
7:30 PM	White 3'; Schöpf (yellow card) 39'	Report	Miller (yellow card) 4'; Rodríguez 44'	Stadium: BC Place; Attendance: 25,902; Referee: Joe Dickerson

October 2 32 – Cascadia Cup	Whitecaps FC	0–3	Seattle Sounders FC	Vancouver, British Columbia
7:30 PM	Adekugbe (yellow card) 13'; Schöpf (yellow card) 39'; Picault (yellow card) 46' (yellow-red card) 88'; Priso (yellow card) 90+1'	Report	Minoungou 14'; Rusnák 65' (pen.); Rothrock 67'	Stadium: BC Place; Attendance: 17,361; Referee: Chris Penso

October 5 33	Whitecaps FC	0–1	Minnesota United FC	Vancouver, British Columbia
4:30 PM	Veselinović (yellow card) 18'; Raposo (yellow card) 79'; Sartini (yellow card) 90+6'		Dotson 24' (pen.); Oluwaseyi (yellow card) 45+5'; Yeboah (yellow card) 69'; St. Clair (yellow card) 75'; Díaz (yellow card) 77'	Stadium: BC Place; Attendance: 21,349; Referee: Ramy Touchan

October 13 25	Whitecaps FC	1–2	Los Angeles FC	Vancouver, British Columbia
4:30 PM	Palencia 62' (o.g.); Sartini (yellow card) 90+5'	Report	Bogusz 1'; Palencia (yellow card) 62'; Sánchez 90+3'	Stadium: BC Place; Attendance: 30,303; Referee: Drew Fischer
Note: Game rescheduled from August 24 due to Los Angeles FC's participation in the Leagues Cup final.

October 19 34	Real Salt Lake	2–1	Whitecaps FC	Sandy, Utah
6:00 PM	Brown (yellow card) 29'; Katranis (yellow card) 33'; Luna 73'; Boehmer 83' (o.g.)	Report	Picault (yellow card) 13'; Gauld 58'; Blackmon (yellow card) 70'; Adekugbe (yellow card) 72'; Ahmed (yellow card) 85'; Berhalter (yellow card) 90+2'	Stadium: America First Field; Attendance: 20,359; Referee: Armando Villarreal

=== MLS Cup playoffs ===
==== Wild Card round ====
October 23 Wild Card	Whitecaps FC	5–0	Portland Timbers	Portland, Oregon
7:30 PM	Gauld 20', 31', 59'; White 24'; Armstrong 51'; Takaoka (yellow card) 54'; Raposo (yellow card) 85'	Report	D. Chará (yellow card) 23'; Evander (yellow card) 69'; K. Miller (yellow card) 85'	Stadium: Providence Park; Attendance: 19,143; Referee: Rubiel Vazquez
Note: Due to a scheduling conflict at BC Place the game was hosted at Providence Park with the Vancouver Whitecaps serving as the home team

==== Round one ====
October 27 Game 1	Los Angeles FC	2–1	Whitecaps FC	Los Angeles, California
6:45 PM	Bouanga 30' (pen.); Olivera 57'; Hollingshead (yellow card) 58'; Long (yellow card) 58'	Report	Laborda (yellow card) 73'; Veselinović (yellow card) 90'; Gauld 90+5'	Stadium: BMO Stadium; Attendance: 22,298; Referee: Jair Marrufo

November 3 Game 2	Whitecaps FC	3–0	Los Angeles FC	Vancouver, British Columbia
5:45 PM	Gauld 10'; Hollingshead 13' (o.g.); Ahmed (yellow card) 50'; Berhalter (yellow card) 57'; Segura 68' (o.g.)	Report	Bouanga (yellow card) 41'; Murillo (yellow card) 84'; Segura (yellow card) 89'	Stadium: BC Place; Attendance: 20,695; Referee: Rosendo Mendoza

November 8 Game 3	Los Angeles FC	1–0	Whitecaps FC	Los Angeles, California
8:00 PM	Bogusz 62'; Hollingshead (yellow card) 88'	Report	Gauld (yellow card) 90+3'	Stadium: BMO Stadium; Attendance: 22,220; Referee: Joe Dickerson
Note: Los Angeles FC won the series 2–1.

== Canadian Championship ==
The Vancouver Whitecaps earned a bye into the quarter-finals, as they were a finalist of the 2023 tournament.

=== Quarter-finals ===
May 7 First leg	Cavalry FC	1–2	Whitecaps FC	Foothills County, Alberta
6:00 PM	Montgomery (yellow card) 52'; Klomp (yellow card) 62'; Shaw 90+3'	Report	Berhalter (yellow card) 27'; Johnson 45+2', 79' (yellow card) 75'; Martins (yellow card) 71'; Laborda (yellow card) 90+5'	Stadium: ATCO Field; Attendance: 4,084; Referee: Ben Hoskins

May 21 Second leg	Whitecaps FC	0–1 (2–2 (a) agg.)	Cavalry FC	Vancouver, British Columbia
7:30 PM	Vite (yellow card) 22'; Ahmed (yellow card) 45'	Report	Daley (yellow card) 7'; Veselinović 32' (o.g.); Brooks (yellow card) 44'; Klomp (yellow card) 59'; Camargo (yellow card) 60'	Stadium: BC Place; Attendance: 11,863; Referee: Mathieu Souaré
Note: 2–2 on aggregate. Whitecaps FC won on away goals.

=== Semi-finals ===
July 10 First leg	Pacific FC	0–1	Whitecaps FC	Langford, British Columbia
7:00 PM	Toussaint (yellow card) 82'	Report	Utvik (yellow card) 45'; Gauld 58'; White (yellow card) 71'	Stadium: Starlight Stadium; Attendance: 5,103; Referee: Renzo Villanueva

August 27 Second leg	Whitecaps FC	1–0 (2–0 agg.)	Pacific FC	Vancouver, British Columbia
7:30 PM	Gauld 14'	Report	Quintana (yellow card) 40'; Toussaint (yellow card) 45+2'; Ceceri (yellow card) 90+1'	Stadium: BC Place; Attendance: 10,966; Referee: Michael Venne

=== Final ===
September 25 Final	Whitecaps FC	0–0 (4–2 p)	Toronto FC	Vancouver, British Columbia
7:00 PM	Picault (yellow card) 15'; Laborda (yellow card) 53'; White (yellow card) 90+3'	Report	Kerr (yellow card) 45+1'	Stadium: BC Place; Attendance: 12,516; Referee: Marie-Soleil Beaudoin
	Penalties
	Gauld (penalty scored); Armstrong (penalty missed); Berhalter (penalty scored); White (penalty scored); Utvik (penalty scored)		(penalty scored) Owusu; (penalty missed) Longstaff; (penalty missed) Thompson; (penalty scored) Osorio

== CONCACAF Champions Cup ==
=== Round one ===
February 7 First Leg	Whitecaps FC	1–1	(Mexico) UANL	Langford, British Columbia (Note: Match could not be played at BC Place due to scheduling conflicts.)
7:00 pm PST	Kreilach 32'; Martins (yellow card) 39'; White (yellow card) 46'	Report	Herrera (yellow card) 51'; Gignac 88'	Stadium: Starlight Stadium; Attendance: 5,763; Referee: Juan Gabriel Calderón (Costa Rica)

February 14 Second Leg	UANL (Mexico)	3–0 (4–1 agg.)	Whitecaps FC	Monterrey, Mexico
6:00pm CST	Gorriarán (yellow card) 35'; Purata (yellow card) 40'; Quiñones 51'; Herrera 85'; Vigón 90+1'	Report	Cubas (yellow card) 20'; Berhalter (yellow card) 61'	Stadium: Estadio Universitario; Attendance: 24,988; Referee: Saíd Martínez (Honduras)

== Leagues Cup ==
=== Group stage ===
West Group 7
Pos	Team	Pld	W	PW	PL	L	GF	GA	GD	Pts	Qualification	VAN	LFC	TIJ
1	(Canadian Soccer Association) Vancouver Whitecaps FC	2	1	1	0	0	5	3	+2	5	Advance to knockout stage	—	—	3–1
2	(United States Soccer Federation) Los Angeles FC	2	1	0	1	0	5	2	+3	4	Advance to knockout stage	2–2	—	3–0
3	(Mexican Football Federation) Tijuana	2	0	0	0	2	1	6	−5	0		—	—	—

Source: Leagues Cup
Rules for classification: Tiebreakers

July 30 Group stage	Los Angeles FC (United States)	2–2 (2–4 p)	Whitecaps FC	Los Angeles, United States
7:30 PM	Olivera (yellow card) 80'; Kamara 88'; Martínez (yellow card) 90'; Bogusz 90+5'	Report	Berhalter 5' (yellow card) 90+1'; Ahmed (yellow card) 13'; Veselinović 17'; Halbouni (yellow card) 53'; Berhalter (yellow card) 90+1'	Stadium: BMO Stadium; Attendance: 18,351; Referee: César Arturo Ramos
	Penalties
	Atuesta (penalty scored); Kamara (penalty missed); Bogusz (penalty missed); Olivera (penalty scored)		(penalty scored) Kreilach; (penalty scored) Berhalter; (penalty scored) Raposo; (penalty scored) Laborda
Note: Whitecaps FC manager Vanni Sartini was sent off (red card) in the 90+8th minute.

August 3 Group stage	Whitecaps FC	3–1	(Mexico) Tijuana	Vancouver, British Columbia
7:00 PM	Picault 49'; Johnson 77'; Vite 83'	Report	Castañeda 8' (yellow card) 25'; Gómez (yellow card) 75'; Mejía (red card) 81'	Stadium: BC Place; Attendance: 18,896; Referee: Marco Ortiz

=== Knockout stage ===
August 7 Round of 32	Whitecaps FC	0–2	(Mexico) UNAM	Vancouver, British Columbia
7:30 PM	Picault (yellow card) 69'	Report	Huerta 36'; Ruvalcaba 57'	Stadium: BC Place; Attendance: 9,691; Referee: César Arturo Ramos

== Cascadia Cup ==
2024 Cascadia Cup standings
Pos	Team	Pld	W	D	L	GF	GA	GD	Pts
1	Portland Timbers	6	2	2	2	8	7	+1	8
2	Seattle Sounders FC	6	2	2	2	7	6	+1	8
3	Vancouver Whitecaps FC	6	2	2	2	7	9	−2	8

Source: "Schedule". mlssoccer.com.
Rules for classification: Scoring

Overall								Home						Away					
Pld	Pts	W	L	T	GF	GA	GD	W	L	T	GF	GA	GD	W	L	T	GF	GA	GD
6	8	2	2	2	7	9	−2	1	1	1	4	6	−2	1	1	1	3	3	0

Last updated: Oct 2, 2024
Source: Standings
Pld = Matches played; Pts = Points; W = Matches won; T = Matches tied; L = Matches lost; GF = Goals for; GA = Goals against; GD = Goal difference

== Statistics ==
=== Appearances and goals ===
As of November 8, 2024

No.	Pos	Nat	Player	Total		MLS		MLS Playoffs		Canadian Championship		Leagues Cup		Champions Cup	
No.	Pos	Nat	Player	Apps	Goals	Apps	Goals	Apps	Goals	Apps	Goals	Apps	Goals	Apps	Goals
Goalkeepers
1	GK	(Japan) JPN	Yohei Takaoka	41	0	33	0	4	0	0	0	2	0	2	0
17	GK	(United States) USA	Joe Bendik	0	0	0	0	0	0	0	0	0	0	0	0
32	GK	(Canada) CAN	Isaac Boehmer	7	0	1	0	0	0	5	0	1	0	0	0
50	GK	(Canada) CAN	Max Anchor	0	0	0	0	0	0	0	0	0	0	0	0
Defenders
2	DF	(Uruguay) URU	Mathías Laborda	40	2	23+3	2	2+2	0	5	0	3	0	2	0
3	DF	(Canada) CAN	Sam Adekugbe	23	1	8+8	1	4	0	2	0	0+1	0	0	0
4	DF	(Serbia) SRB	Ranko Veselinović	45	3	31+1	2	4	0	4+1	0	2	1	2	0
6	DF	(United States) USA	Tristan Blackmon	32	0	21+4	0	4	0	0+1	0	0	0	2	0
7	DF	(Canada) CAN	Ryan Raposo	41	3	18+12	3	0+2	0	2+2	0	1+2	0	2	0
12	DF	(Syria) SYR	Belal Halbouni	7	0	2+1	0	0	0	0+2	0	2	0	0	0
15	DF	(Norway) NOR	Bjørn Inge Utvik	33	0	19+4	0	0+1	0	5	0	3	0	0+1	0
18	DF	(Colombia) COL	Édier Ocampo	6	0	1+5	0	0	0	0	0	0	0	0	0
27	DF	(Australia) AUS	Giuseppe Bovalina	16	0	1+10	0	0	0	1+2	0	0+2	0	0	0
41	DF	(England) ENG	Eliot Goldthorp	1	0	0	0	0	0	0	0	0+1	0	0	0
83	DF	(New Zealand) NZL	Finn Linder	1	0	0	0	0	0	0	0	0+1	0	0	0
Midfielders
8	MF	(Austria) AUT	Alessandro Schöpf	43	1	23+7	1	0+4	0	2+2	0	2+1	0	2	0
13	MF	(Canada) CAN	Ralph Priso	20	0	5+9	0	0+1	0	2+1	0	1+1	0	0	0
16	MF	(United States) USA	Sebastian Berhalter	45	3	18+13	2	2+2	0	3+2	0	3	1	1+1	0
19	MF	(Croatia) CRO	Damir Kreilach	26	3	6+11	2	0+2	0	0+2	0	0+3	0	2	1
20	MF	(Paraguay) PAR	Andrés Cubas	36	0	23+1	0	4	0	3+1	0	2+1	0	1	0
22	MF	(Canada) CAN	Ali Ahmed	31	1	15+7	1	2+1	0	3+1	0	2	0	0	0
25	MF	(Scotland) SCO	Ryan Gauld	41	17	28+2	10	4	5	3+2	2	0	0	2	0
26	MF	(Scotland) SCO	Stuart Armstrong	11	2	1+5	1	4	1	0+1	0	0	0	0	0
45	MF	(Ecuador) ECU	Pedro Vite	41	2	23+5	1	3	0	4+1	0	2+1	1	1+1	0
59	MF	(Canada) CAN	Jeevan Badwal	1	0	0	0	0	0	0+1	0	0	0	0	0
Forwards
11	FW	(Haiti) HAI	Fafà Picault	40	10	18+11	9	3+1	0	1+1	0	3	1	0+2	0
23	FW	(Colombia) COL	Déiber Caicedo	6	0	1+4	0	0+1	0	0	0	0	0	0	0
24	FW	(United States) USA	Brian White	44	16	28+2	15	4	1	4+1	0	3	0	2	0
28	FW	(Canada) CAN	Levonte Johnson	34	3	7+18	0	0+2	0	3	2	1+2	1	0+1	0
52	FW	(Canada) CAN	Nicolas Fleuriau Chateau	2	0	0+2	0	0	0	0	0	0	0	0	0
55	FW	(Tanzania) TAN	Cyprian Kachwele	3	0	0+1	0	0	0	1+1	0	0	0	0	0
Players transferred out during the season
14	DF	(Portugal) POR	Luís Martins	19	0	9+7	0	0	0	1+1	0	0	0	1	0
23	DF	(Jamaica) JAM	Javain Brown	19	0	11+5	0	0	0	1	0	0	0	0+2	0
26	MF	(Cameroon) CMR	J.C. Ngando	1	0	0	0	0	0	0	0	0	0	0+1	0
92	MF	(New Zealand) NZL	Jay Herdman	1	0	0+1	0	0	0	0	0	0	0	0	0

Source: Competitions

=== Goalscorers ===
As of November 8, 2024

Rank	No.	Pos	Nat	Name	MLS	MLS Playoffs	Canadian Championship	Leagues Cup	Champions Cup	Total
1	25	MF	(Scotland)	Ryan Gauld	10	5	2	0	0	17
2	24	FW	(United States)	Brian White	15	1	0	0	0	16
3	11	FW	(Haiti)	Fafà Picault	9	0	0	1	0	10
4	4	DF	(Serbia)	Ranko Veselinović	2	0	0	1	0	3
4	7	DF	(Canada)	Ryan Raposo	3	0	0	0	0	3
4	16	MF	(United States)	Sebastian Berhalter	2	0	0	1	0	3
4	19	MF	(Croatia)	Damir Kreilach	2	0	0	0	1	3
4	28	FW	(Canada)	Levonte Johnson	0	0	2	1	0	3
9	2	DF	(Uruguay)	Mathías Laborda	2	0	0	0	0	2
9	26	MF	(Scotland)	Stuart Armstrong	1	1	0	0	0	2
9	45	MF	(Ecuador)	Pedro Vite	1	0	0	1	0	2
12	3	DF	(Canada)	Sam Adekugbe	1	0	0	0	0	1
12	8	MF	(Austria)	Alessandro Schöpf	1	0	0	0	0	1
12	22	MF	(Canada)	Ali Ahmed	1	0	0	0	0	1
Own goals					2	2	0	0	0	4
Totals					51	9	4	5	1	69

=== Clean sheets ===
As of November 8, 2024

Rank	No.	Pos	Nat	Name	MLS	MLS Playoffs	Canadian Championship	Leagues Cup	Champions Cup	Total
1	1	GK	(Japan)	Yohei Takaoka	7	2	0	0	0	9
2	32	GK	(Canada)	Isaac Boehmer	0	0	3	0	0	3
Totals					7	2	3	0	0	12

=== Disciplinary record ===
As of November 8, 2024

No.	Pos	Nat	Player	MLS			MLS Playoffs			Canadian Championship			Leagues Cup			Champions Cup			Total		
No.	Pos	Nat	Player	Yellow card	(yellow card) (yellow-red card)	Red card	Yellow card	(yellow card) (yellow-red card)	Red card	Yellow card	(yellow card) (yellow-red card)	Red card	Yellow card	(yellow card) (yellow-red card)	Red card	Yellow card	(yellow card) (yellow-red card)	Red card	Yellow card	(yellow card) (yellow-red card)	Red card
1	GK	(Japan)	Yohei Takaoka	2	0	0	1	0	0	0	0	0	0	0	0	0	0	0	3	0	0
2	DF	(Uruguay)	Mathías Laborda	3	0	0	1	0	0	2	0	0	0	0	0	0	0	0	6	0	0
3	DF	(Canada)	Sam Adekugbe	4	0	0	0	0	0	0	0	0	0	0	0	0	0	0	4	0	0
4	DF	(Serbia)	Ranko Veselinović	3	0	0	1	0	0	0	0	0	0	0	0	0	0	0	4	0	0
6	DF	(United States)	Tristan Blackmon	4	0	0	0	0	0	0	0	0	0	0	0	0	0	0	4	0	0
7	DF	(Canada)	Ryan Raposo	3	0	0	1	0	0	0	0	0	0	0	0	0	0	0	4	0	0
8	MF	(Austria)	Alessandro Schöpf	3	1	0	0	0	0	0	0	0	0	0	0	0	0	0	3	1	0
11	FW	(Haiti)	Fafà Picault	6	1	0	0	0	0	1	0	0	1	0	0	0	0	0	8	1	0
12	DF	(Syria)	Belal Halbouni	0	0	0	0	0	0	0	0	0	1	0	0	0	0	0	1	0	0
13	MF	(Canada)	Ralph Priso	2	0	0	0	0	0	0	0	0	0	0	0	0	0	0	2	0	0
14	DF	(Portugal)	Luís Martins	1	0	0	0	0	0	1	0	0	0	0	0	1	0	0	3	0	0
15	DF	(Norway)	Bjørn Inge Utvik	1	0	1	0	0	0	1	0	0	0	0	0	0	0	0	2	0	1
16	MF	(United States)	Sebastian Berhalter	5	0	0	1	0	0	1	0	0	1	0	0	1	0	0	9	0	0
17	GK	(United States)	Joe Bendik	0	0	0	0	0	0	0	0	0	0	0	0	0	0	0	0	0	0
18	DF	(Colombia)	Édier Ocampo	0	0	0	0	0	0	0	0	0	0	0	0	0	0	0	0	0	0
19	MF	(Croatia)	Damir Kreilach	0	0	0	0	0	0	0	0	0	0	0	0	0	0	0	0	0	0
20	MF	(Paraguay)	Andrés Cubas	7	0	0	0	0	0	0	0	0	0	0	0	1	0	0	8	0	0
22	MF	(Canada)	Ali Ahmed	3	0	0	1	0	0	1	0	0	1	0	0	0	0	0	6	0	0
23	DF	(Jamaica)	Javain Brown	1	0	0	0	0	0	0	0	0	0	0	0	0	0	0	1	0	0
23	FW	(Colombia)	Déiber Caicedo	0	0	0	0	0	0	0	0	0	0	0	0	0	0	0	0	0	0
24	FW	(United States)	Brian White	5	0	0	0	0	0	2	0	0	0	0	0	1	0	0	8	0	0
25	MF	(Scotland)	Ryan Gauld	3	0	0	1	0	0	0	0	0	0	0	0	0	0	0	4	0	0
26	MF	(Scotland)	Stuart Armstrong	1	0	0	0	0	0	0	0	0	0	0	0	0	0	0	1	0	0
26	MF	(Cameroon)	J.C. Ngando	0	0	0	0	0	0	0	0	0	0	0	0	0	0	0	0	0	0
27	DF	(Australia)	Giuseppe Bovalina	0	0	0	0	0	0	0	0	0	0	0	0	0	0	0	0	0	0
28	FW	(Canada)	Levonte Johnson	1	0	0	0	0	0	1	0	0	0	0	0	0	0	0	2	0	0
32	GK	(Canada)	Isaac Boehmer	0	0	0	0	0	0	0	0	0	0	0	0	0	0	0	0	0	0
45	MF	(Ecuador)	Pedro Vite	2	0	0	0	0	0	1	0	0	0	0	0	0	0	0	3	0	0
50	GK	(Canada)	Max Anchor	0	0	0	0	0	0	0	0	0	0	0	0	0	0	0	0	0	0
52	FW	(Canada)	Nicolas Fleuriau Chateau	1	0	0	0	0	0	0	0	0	0	0	0	0	0	0	1	0	0
59	MF	(Canada)	Jeevan Badwal	0	0	0	0	0	0	0	0	0	0	0	0	0	0	0	0	0	0
Totals				61	2	1	7	0	0	11	0	0	4	0	0	4	0	0	87	2	1
