= Ali Ahmed (soccer) =

Canadian soccer player (born 2000)

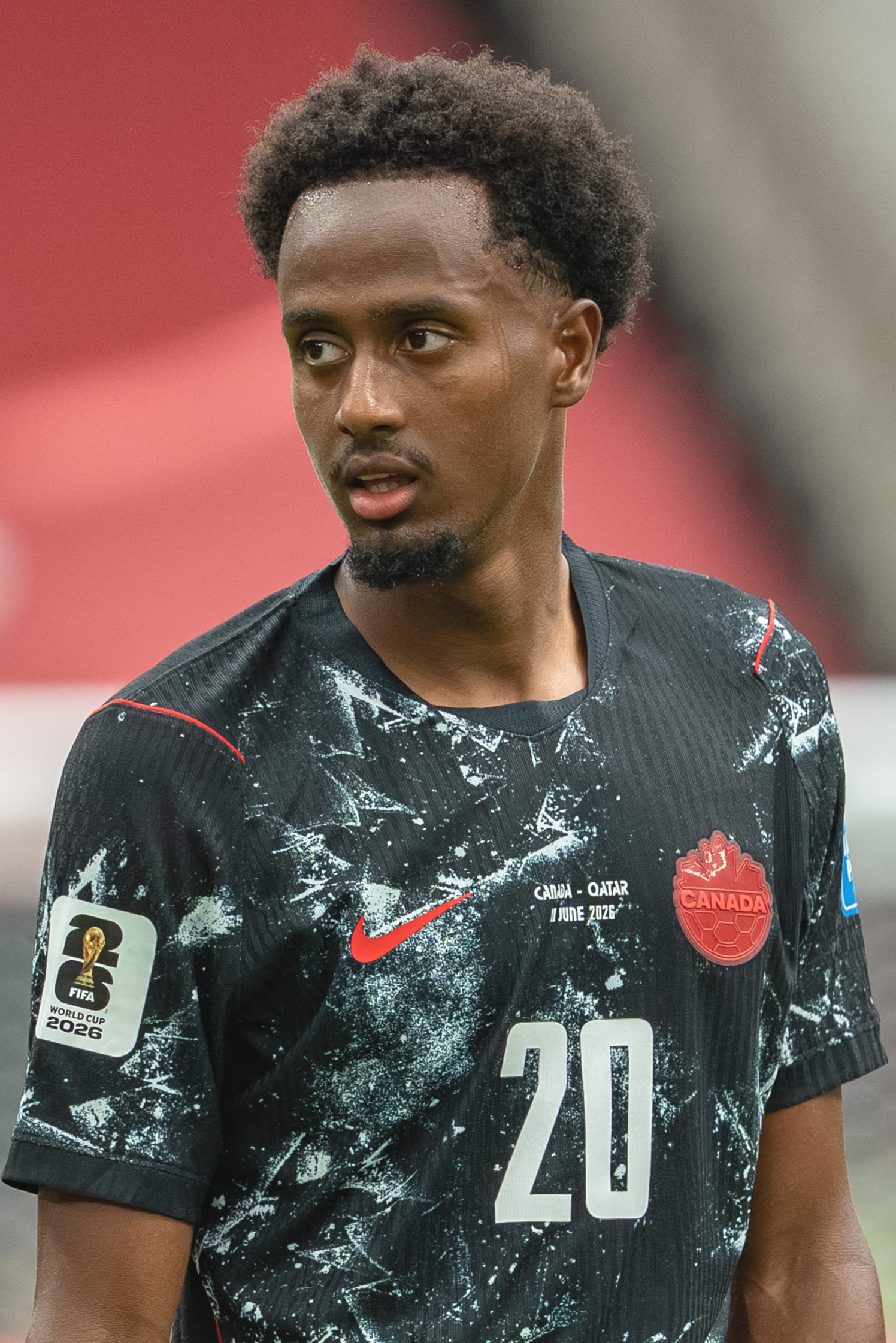
- Ahmed with Canada in 2026

Personal information
- Full name: Ali Ahmed
- Date of birth: October 10, 2000 (age 26)
- Place of birth: Toronto, Ontario, Canada
- Height: 1.80 m (5 ft 11 in)
- Positions: Wide midfielder; winger

Team information
- Current team: Norwich City
- Number: 37

Youth career
- North Toronto Nitros
- 2020–2022: Vancouver Whitecaps FC

Senior career*
Years	Team	Apps	(Gls)
2022	Whitecaps FC 2	15	(0)
2022	→ Vancouver Whitecaps FC (loan)	2	(0)
2023–2026	Vancouver Whitecaps FC	66	(4)
2026–	Norwich City	19	(4)

International career^{‡}
2023–	Canada	28	(1)
- * Club domestic league appearances and goals as of May 2, 2026 ‡ National team caps and goals as of July 4, 2026

Ali Ahmed (born October 10, 2000) is a Canadian professional soccer player who plays as a wide midfielder or winger for EFL Championship club Norwich City and the Canada national team.

== Early life ==
Ahmed was born in Toronto to Ethiopian parents and grew up in Lawrence Heights. He began playing youth soccer at age six with the North Toronto Nitros. His mother, Muna Isa, enrolled him in a wide range of extracurricular activities from a young age, including swimming, basketball and tutoring, hoping to give him opportunities she had not had growing up. Ahmed has said that although he was drawn more strongly to basketball as a child, spending many evenings watching or playing pickup games, his mother held him to his earlier commitment to soccer and insisted he continue attending training even when reluctant, a discipline he has credited as foundational to his later career.

In 2018, he went on trial with the Toronto Academy, who were ready to sign him to join the academy, but he opted to head to Portugal to trial with the U19 side of C.F. Os Belenenses, but was unable to sign as he was under 18. Ahmed has said the club's coaching staff were impressed with his performance during the trial, but that he was unaware at the time that international players needed to be 18 to complete a permanent move, which prevented a signing. He then went to Spain, before returning to Toronto, before returning to Europe to trial in Portugal, the United Kingdom, and the Netherlands. In November 2019, he trialed with the Vancouver Whitecaps Academy and then trialed again the following year, and in August 2020, he joined the Vancouver Whitecaps Academy. In 2021, he played with the Vancouver Whitecaps U-23. He attended pre-season camp with the first team in 2021 and 2022.

== Club career ==
=== Whitecaps FC 2 ===
Ahmed has said his trial with the Whitecaps' second team in March 2021 went well enough that head coach Vanni Sartini promoted him to preseason training with the first team within the same week, despite Ahmed initially only hoping to make the second-team roster. In March 2022, he signed a professional contract with Whitecaps FC 2 in MLS Next Pro. He made his professional debut on March 26 against Houston Dynamo 2. He led the team in assists with five in 2022. He was named the 2022 WFC2 Player of the Year.

=== Vancouver Whitecaps ===
On April 22, 2022, he joined the first team on a short-term four-day loan ahead of their MLS league match against Austin. In the match the next day, he made his official first-team debut. On August 4, he signed another short-term loan with Vancouver. In November 2022, he signed a permanent contract with the first team for the 2023 season, becoming the first Whitecaps FC 2 player to sign a first-team contract. On May 24, he suffered what appeared to be a serious injury in a match, where he lost consciousness and was treated on-field for seventeen minutes, but was released from hospital the next day with only a concussion. On June 7, 2023, he won the 2023 Canadian Championship with the Whitecaps, defeating CF Montreal and won the tournament's Best Young Canadian Player Award.

=== Norwich City ===
On January 4, 2026, Ahmed moved to England, signing for EFL Championship side Norwich City on a three-and-a-half-year deal with an option for a further year.

He made his debut for the club on January 17, 2026, starting the match and providing an assist within the opening 10 minutes against Wrexham. He scored his first goal for Norwich three days later in a 5–0 victory over West Bromwich Albion. On January 26, 2026, he recorded a goal and an assist in a 2–1 victory against league leaders Coventry City. In a pre-season friendly against Osasuna ahead of the 2026–27 season, Ahmed suffered an ACL injury with the player expected to miss much of the forthcoming campaign.

== International career ==
In May 2023, Ahmed was listed on the Canada preliminary roster for the 2023 CONCACAF Nations League Finals. In June 2023, he was named to the final 23-man squad for the 2023 CONCACAF Gold Cup. Ahmed made his debut for Canada on June 27 in their tournament opener against Guadeloupe. In June 2024, Ahmed was named to Canada's squad for the 2024 Copa América. He scored his first goal for Canada in a friendly against Romania on September 5, 2025.

In May 2026, Ahmed was named to Canada's squad for the 2026 FIFA World Cup. Ahmed helped Canada reach the semifinals of the 2024 Copa América in the country's first appearance at the tournament.

== Personal life ==
Ahmed is a Muslim and fasts during Ramadan while playing matches. Ahmed is of Oromo descent, and has said his parents' move to Canada was driven partly by a desire to give their children opportunities unavailable to them growing up. He grew up playing for Oromia FC, a community team. Upon moving to Vancouver to pursue his opportunity with the Whitecaps, Ahmed relied on extended family in the city, staying with an aunt and uncle. His supporters, a group of friends, family and community members who travel to his matches, are known to him as the "Ali A Fan Club."

== Career statistics ==
=== Club ===
As of match played May 2, 2026

Appearances and goals by club, season and competition
Club	Season	League			Playoffs		National cup (Note: Includes U.S. Open Cup, FA Cup)		Continental		Other		Total	
Club	Season	Division	Apps	Goals	Apps	Goals	Apps	Goals	Apps	Goals	Apps	Goals	Apps	Goals
Whitecaps FC 2	2022	MLS Next Pro	15	0	—		—		—		—		15	0
Vancouver Whitecaps	2022	MLS	2	0	—		0	0	—		—		2	0
Vancouver Whitecaps	2023	MLS	22	2	2	0	2	1	3 (Note: Appearances in CONCACAF Champions Cup)	0	1 (Note: Appearances in Leagues Cup)	0	30	3
Vancouver Whitecaps	2024	MLS	22	1	3	0	4	0	0	0	2	0	31	1
Vancouver Whitecaps	2025	MLS	22	0	5	1	3	3	9	0	0	0	39	4
Vancouver Whitecaps	Total		68	3	10	1	9	4	12	0	3	0	102	8
Norwich City	2025–26	Championship	19	4	—		2	0	—		—		21	4
Career total			102	6	10	1	11	4	12	0	3	0	138	11

=== International ===
As of match played July 4, 2026

Appearances and goals by national team and year
National team	Year	Apps	Goals
Canada	2023	4	0
Canada	2024	8	0
Canada	2025	10	1
Canada	2026	6	0
Total		28	1

Scores and results list Canada's goal tally first.

List of international goals scored by Ali Ahmed
No.	Date	Venue	Cap	Opponent	Score	Result	Competition
1	September 5, 2025	Arena Națională, Bucharest, Romania	18	Romania	2–0	3–0	International Friendly

== Honours ==
Vancouver Whitecaps

- Canadian Championship: 2023, 2024, 2025

Individual

- Canadian Championship Best Young Canadian Player: 2023
- George Gross Memorial Trophy: 2025
