= Ryan Raposo =

Canadian soccer player (born 1999)

- Raposos with Los Angeles FC in 2026

Personal information
- Full name: Ryan Christopher Raposo
- Date of birth: March 5, 1999 (age 27)
- Place of birth: Hamilton, Ontario, Canada
- Height: 1.70 m (5 ft 7 in)
- Positions: Wingback; winger

Team information
- Current team: Los Angeles FC
- Number: 21

Youth career
- 2003–2009: Mount Hamilton SC
- 2010–2011: Toronto FC
- 2012–2015: Burlington Youth SC
- 2016–2017: Vaughan SC

College career
Years	Team	Apps	(Gls)
2018–2019	Syracuse Orange	38	(19)

Senior career*
Years	Team	Apps	(Gls)
2017–2019	Vaughan Azzurri	24	(13)
2020–2024	Vancouver Whitecaps	121	(5)
2025–	Los Angeles FC	18	(0)
2025	Los Angeles FC 2	2	(0)

International career^{‡}
2021	Canada U23	4	(0)
- * Club domestic league appearances and goals as of September 26, 2026 ‡ National team caps and goals as of March 28, 2021

Ryan Christopher Raposo (born March 5, 1999), also known as Wu Xiaohai (Chinese: 伍小海), is a Canadian professional soccer player who plays for MLS club Los Angeles FC.

== Early life ==
Born in Hamilton to a Portuguese-Canadian father (Rui) and Chinese-Canadian mother (Lori), Raposo began playing soccer at a young age, making his first competitive rep team when he was eight with Mount Hamilton SC. When he was 11, he joined the Toronto FC Academy, but the club released him two years later, believing him to be "too small and too skinny". Afterwards, he joined the Burlington Youth SC at age 12, joining the provincial program at age 14. Soon after, he was selected to play on the Canadian under-15 national team. When he was 16, he moved to Vaughan SC. In 2016, he fractured his right fibula in a club match against Sigma FC. He was named MVP at the 2017 Canada Summer Games, as part of the gold medal-winning Team Ontario.

Raposo attended Syracuse University, where he played soccer for two years. In his second and final year, Raposo led his team in goals (15) and points (37), which set the school records for a sophomore, and earned a spot in the All-ACC first team.

== Club career ==
During college, Raposo also appeared for League1 Ontario side Vaughan Azzurri in 2017, 2018 and 2019 during the NCAA offseason. He played in the 2019 Canadian Championship and scored in the first leg of their tie, which was lost on away goals to Canadian Premier League club HFX Wanderers FC.

On January 9, 2020, Raposo was selected fourth overall by Vancouver Whitecaps FC in the 2020 MLS SuperDraft, and was signed by the club to a Generation Adidas contract. He made his debut on March 7, 2020, coming on as a substitute in the 67th minute, against the Los Angeles Galaxy, recording an assist on the only goal of the game. He scored his first professional goal in the 73rd minute of a 1–0 win over Sporting Kansas City on April 2, 2022. Later that year, he won the Best Young Canadian Player Award at the 2022 Canadian Championship, after scoring one goal and getting two assists. On February 20, 2025, China League One club Liaoning Tieren announced that Raposo made an agreement to join the club in principle as a naturalized Chinese player, but he was never registered for the season. It was announced on April 25, 2025, that Liaoning Tieren has ended its attempt to naturalize Raposo.

Los Angeles FC signed Raposo on April 24, 2025, for the 2025 season and a club option for 2026. At the end of the 2025 season, his club option would be declined, making him a free agent. On January 29, 2026, Raposo signed a new contract through the 2027–28 season.

== International career ==
Raposo is eligible for Canada, China, and Portugal.

He joined the Canadian under-15 in 2014, playing matches against Costa Rican teams.

Raposo was named to the Canadian under-23 roster for the 2020 CONCACAF Men's Olympic Qualifying Championship on March 10, 2021.

In May 2023, Raposo was listed on the Canada preliminary rosters for the 2023 CONCACAF Nations League Finals.

== Style of play ==
Described as "a skilful winger" by Neil Davidson, Raposo is also capable of playing as a number ten. His former Syracuse coach Ian McIntyre labelled him a "dynamic, exciting attacker who can torment defenders."

== Honours ==
Vancouver Whitecaps

- Canadian Championship: 2022, 2023, 2024

Individual

- Canadian Championship Best Young Canadian Player: 2022

== Career statistics ==
As of match played on September 26, 2026

Club	Season	League			Playoffs		Domestic Cup		Continental		Other		Total	
Club	Season	Division	Apps	Goals	Apps	Goals	Apps	Goals	Apps	Goals	Apps	Goals	Apps	Goals
Vaughan Azzurri	2017	League1 Ontario	10	9	—		—		—		0	0	10	9
Vaughan Azzurri	2018	League1 Ontario	4	0	0	0	—		—		3	1	7	1
Vaughan Azzurri	2019	League1 Ontario	10	4	0	0	2	1	—		—		12	5
Vaughan Azzurri	Total		24	13	0	0	2	1	0	0	3	1	29	15
Vancouver Whitecaps FC	2020	Major League Soccer	15	0	—		—		—		—		15	0
Vancouver Whitecaps FC	2021	Major League Soccer	21	0	0	0	1	0	—		—		22	0
Vancouver Whitecaps FC	2022	Major League Soccer	29	2	—		4	1	—		—		33	3
Vancouver Whitecaps FC	2023	Major League Soccer	26	0	1	0	2	0	4	1	2	0	35	1
Vancouver Whitecaps FC	2024	Major League Soccer	30	3	2	0	4	0	2	0	3	0	41	3
Vancouver Whitecaps FC	Total		121	5	3	0	11	1	6	1	5	0	146	7
Los Angeles FC	2025	Major League Soccer	5	0	1	0	—		1	0	2	0	9	0
Los Angeles FC	2026	Major League Soccer	13	0	0	0	0	0	2	0	0	0	15	0
Los Angeles FC	Total		18	0	1	0	0	0	2	0	2	0	24	0
Los Angeles FC 2	2025	MLS Next Pro	2	0	—		0	0	—		—		2	0
Career total			165	18	4	0	13	2	9	1	10	1	201	22
