= Andrés Ayala (footballer, born 1989) =

Uruguayan footballer

Personal information
- Full name: Jorge Andrés Ayala Iraola
- Date of birth: 14 March 1989 (age 37)
- Place of birth: Montevideo, Uruguay
- Height: 1.72 m (5 ft 8 in)
- Position: Defender

Team information
- Current team: Biaschesi

Senior career*
Years	Team	Apps	(Gls)
2010–2011	Central Español	2	(0)
2011–	Biaschesi	2	(0)
- * Club domestic league appearances and goals as of 31/01/2012

Jorge Andrés Ayala Iraola (born 14 March 1989) is a Uruguayan footballer who plays as a defender for GC Biaschesi in Switzerland.
