= 2025 MLS All-Star Game =

Soccer exhibition match in Austin, Texas, U.S.

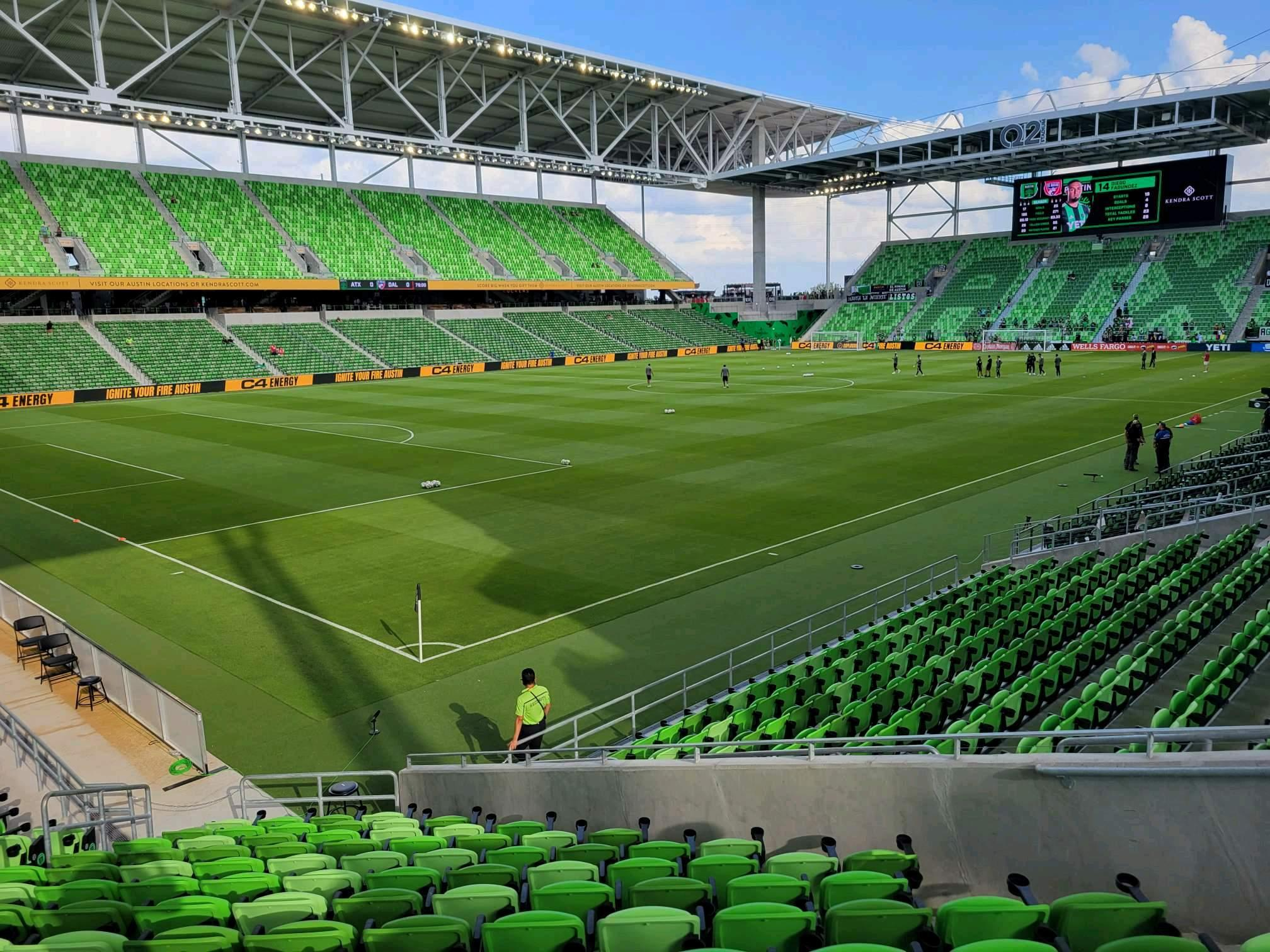
- The Q2 Stadium in Austin, Texas was the venue for the match.
- Event: 2025 Major League Soccer season
| MLS All-Stars | Liga MX All-Stars |
| (United States) (Canada) | (Mexico) |
| 3 | 1 |
- Date: July 23, 2025
- Venue: Q2 Stadium, Austin, Texas, United States
- All-Star MVP: Tai Baribo (MLS All-Stars)
- Referee: Rosendo Mendoza (United States)
- Attendance: 20,738

The 2025 Major League Soccer All-Star Game was the 29th annual Major League Soccer All-Star Game, an exhibition soccer match in the United States. It featured all-star squads from Major League Soccer (MLS) and Liga MX of Mexico—the fourth edition to use the inter-league format. The All-Star Game was played on July 23, 2025, at Q2 Stadium in Austin, Texas.

== Background ==
On May 15, 2024, MLS announced that the 2025 MLS All-Star Game would be played at Austin FC's Q2 Stadium in Austin, Texas. The selection made it the first MLS All-Star Game to be hosted in Texas since 2010, and the first to be hosted in a soccer-specific stadium. On March 18, 2025, the Liga MX All-Stars were announced as the All-Star game opponents, the fourth time the two sides had played one another and the second consecutive All-Star match featuring Liga MX.

== Pre-match ==
Major League Soccer built upon a previous initiative to support the victims of the July 2025 Central Texas floods, in which the league, Austin FC, FC Dallas, and Houston Dynamo FC pledged $500,000 to support life-sustaining humanitarian and disaster relief efforts by launching the Texas Together campaign. Ahead of the All-Star Game, the league honored victims of the floods and recognized the efforts of first responders with an on-field tribute. The league also announced that they would donate 100% of the proceeds from an auction for signed MLS and Liga MX All-Stars jerseys to flood relief efforts.

== Skills Challenge ==
The MLS All-Star Skills Challenge was held on July 22 at Q2 Stadium, and included events in five fields: shooting, touches, cross-and-volley, passing, and a crossbar challenge. The rosters included ten players from the MLS All-Stars and Liga MX All-Stars rosters respectively, as well as four special guests. The four competing special guests were former United States men's national team player Clint Dempsey, current United States women's national team player Lindsey Heaps, Mexico women's national team player Nicolette Hernández, and former Mexico national team player Oribe Peralta. Internet personality IShowSpeed also participated in the shooting and passing challenges, but his results were not counted towards the overall score. The single-elimination Goalie Wars tournament held between four select MLS Next Pro goalkeepers also returned, with Houston Dynamo 2 goalkeeper Pedro Cruz defeating Orlando City B goalkeeper Carlos Mercado in the final.

2025 MLS All-Star Skills Challenge results
| Event | MLS score | Liga MX score |
|---|---|---|
| Shooting | 132 | 106 |
| Touch | 58 | 199 |
| Cross & Volley | 70 | 70 |
| Passing | 2 wins | 1 win |
| Crossbar | Win | Loss |

== Squads ==
=== MLS All-Stars ===
The initial MLS All-Stars roster was announced on June 25, 2025. Players from 15 clubs were selected; the most-represented teams on the roster were Vancouver Whitecaps FC with four players, and Nashville SC, Philadelphia Union, and San Diego FC with three players each. On July 23, the final roster for the MLS All-Stars was announced, featuring 29 players from 15 clubs. Austin FC head coach Nico Estévez served as the manager for the MLS All-Stars.

Inter Miami CF players Lionel Messi and Jordi Alba were both voted onto the MLS All-Star squad, but did not participate in the game or associated events. MLS announced on July 25 that both players would be suspended for the team's next regular season match per the league's policies.

Note: Flags indicate national team as defined under FIFA eligibility rules. Players may hold more than one non-FIFA nationality.
† indicates a player who participated in the MLS All-Star Skills Challenge.

2025 MLS All-Stars roster
| No. | Pos. | Nat. | Player | Club | Selection | App. |
|---|---|---|---|---|---|---|
| 97 | GK | (Canada) CAN | Dayne St. Clair | Minnesota United FC | Vote | 2nd |
| 1 | GK | (United States) USA | Brad Stuver † | Austin FC | Coach | 1st |
| 23 | GK | (Japan) JPN | Yohei Takaoka † | Vancouver Whitecaps FC | Coach | 1st |
| 27 | DF | (United States) USA | Max Arfsten | Columbus Crew | Coach | 1st |
| 2 | DF | (Brazil) BRA | Guilherme Biro | Austin FC | Coach | 1st |
| 33 | DF | (United States) USA | Tristan Blackmon | Vancouver Whitecaps FC | Vote | 1st |
| 15 | DF | (New Zealand) NZL | Michael Boxall | Minnesota United FC | Vote | 1st |
| 30 | DF | (United States) USA | Alex Freeman † | Orlando City SC | Vote | 1st |
| 5 | DF | (Norway) NOR | Jakob Glesnes | Philadelphia Union | Coach | 3rd |
| 31 | DF | (Honduras) HON | Andy Najar | Nashville SC | Coach | 1st |
| 12 | DF | (United States) USA | Miles Robinson | FC Cincinnati | Coach | 2nd |
| 28 | DF | (Germany) GER | Kai Wagner | Philadelphia Union | Coach | 3rd |
| 16 | MF | (United States) USA | Sebastian Berhalter † | Vancouver Whitecaps FC | Vote | 1st |
| 32 | MF | (Argentina) ARG | Cristian Espinoza | San Jose Earthquakes | Coach | 2nd |
| 19 | MF | (Brazil) BRA | Evander (c) † | FC Cincinnati | Vote | 2nd |
| 22 | MF | (Spain) ESP | Carles Gil | New England Revolution | Coach | 3rd |
| 8 | MF | (United States) USA | Diego Luna † | Real Salt Lake | Vote | 2nd |
| 29 | MF | (Germany) GER | Hany Mukhtar | Nashville SC | Coach | 4th |
| 6 | MF | (Denmark) DEN | Jeppe Tverskov | San Diego FC | Coach | 1st |
| 14 | MF | (Mexico) MEX | Obed Vargas | Seattle Sounders FC | Coach | 1st |
| 77 | MF | (Denmark) DEN | Philip Zinckernagel | Chicago Fire FC | Coach | 1st |
| 9 | FW | (Israel) ISR | Tai Baribo | Philadelphia Union | Vote | 1st |
| 99 | FW | (Gabon) GAB | Denis Bouanga † | Los Angeles FC | Vote | 3rd |
| 7 | FW | (Denmark) DEN | Anders Dreyer † | San Diego FC | Coach | 1st |
| 11 | FW | (Mexico) MEX | Hirving Lozano | San Diego FC | Commissioner | 1st |
| 87 | FW | (Croatia) CRO | Marco Pašalić | Orlando City SC | Coach | 1st |
| 17 | FW | (Uruguay) URU | Diego Rossi | Columbus Crew | Coach | 4th |
| 98 | FW | (England) ENG | Sam Surridge † | Nashville SC | Coach | 1st |
| 24 | FW | (United States) USA | Brian White | Vancouver Whitecaps FC | Vote | 1st |

=== Liga MX All-Stars ===
The first 14 selections for the Liga MX All-Stars roster was announced on July 6, 2025, as part of the Balón de Oro awards. The remaining 15 players were announced on July 9; the most-represented teams on the roster were América with four players, followed by Cruz Azul and Pachuca with three players each. On July 23, the final roster for the Liga MX All-Stars was announced, featuring 23 players from 11 clubs. América head coach André Jardine served as the Liga MX All-Stars manager for the second consecutive year.

Note: Flags indicate national team as defined under FIFA eligibility rules. Players may hold more than one non-FIFA nationality.
† indicates a player who participated in the MLS All-Star Skills Challenge.

2025 Liga MX All-Stars roster
| No. | Pos. | Nat. | Player | Club |
|---|---|---|---|---|
| 1 | GK | (Mexico) MEX | Luis Malagón † | América |
| 23 | GK | (Colombia) COL | Kevin Mier † | Cruz Azul |
| 5 | DF | (Mexico) MEX | Alonso Aceves | Pachuca |
| 4 | DF | (Colombia) COL | Willer Ditta | Cruz Azul |
| 15 | DF | (Brazil) BRA | Gustavo Ferrareis | Puebla |
| 20 | DF | (Mexico) MEX | Jesús Gallardo | Toluca |
| 13 | DF | (Brazil) BRA | Luan Garcia † | Toluca |
| 2 | DF | (Brazil) BRA | Joaquim Henrique | Tigres UANL |
| 93 | DF | (Spain) ESP | Sergio Ramos | Monterrey |
| 3 | DF | (Mexico) MEX | Israel Reyes | América |
| 26 | MF | (Mexico) MEX | Alan Bautista | Pachuca |
| 17 | MF | (Argentina) ARG | Juan Brunetta † | Tigres UANL |
| 10 | MF | (Spain) ESP | Sergio Canales † | Monterrey |
| 6 | MF | (Mexico) MEX | Kevin Castañeda | Tijuana |
| 18 | MF | (Brazil) BRA | Rodrigo Dourado † | Atlético San Luis |
| 28 | MF | (Mexico) MEX | Elías Montiel | Pachuca |
| 19 | MF | (Mexico) MEX | Gilberto Mora † | Tijuana |
| 8 | MF | (Argentina) ARG | Agustín Palavecino | Necaxa |
| 7 | MF | (Uruguay) URU | Brian Rodríguez † | América |
| 16 | MF | (United States) USA | Alejandro Zendejas † | América |
| 25 | FW | (Mexico) MEX | Roberto Alvarado | Guadalajara |
| 27 | FW | (Colombia) COL | Diber Cambindo | Nexaca |
| 9 | FW | (Mexico) MEX | Ángel Sepúlveda † | Cruz Azul |

== Match ==
2025 MLS All-Star Game
July 23, 2025
8:00 p.m. CDT

| MLS All-Stars (United States) (Canada) | 3–1 | (Mexico) Liga MX All-Stars |
|---|---|---|
| Surridge 28'; Baribo 51'; White 80' | Report | Mora 64' |

Q2 Stadium, Austin, Texas
Attendance: 20,738
Referee: Rosendo Mendoza (United States)

| GK | 1 | (United States) Brad Stuver | | (substituted off) 35' |
| RB | 31 | (Honduras) Andy Najar | | (substituted off) 35' |
| CB | 15 | (New Zealand) Michael Boxall | | (substituted off) 46' |
| CB | 33 | (United States) Tristan Blackmon | | (substituted off) 35' |
| LB | 28 | (Germany) Kai Wagner | | (substituted off) 46' |
| MF | 7 | (Denmark) Anders Dreyer | | (substituted off) 35' |
| MF | 16 | (United States) Sebastian Berhalter | | (substituted off) 46' |
| MF | 19 | (Brazil) Evander (c) | | (substituted off) 46' |
| RW | 11 | (Mexico) Hirving Lozano | | (substituted off) 35' |
| CF | 98 | (England) Sam Surridge | | (substituted off) 34' |
| LW | 99 | (Gabon) Denis Bouanga | | (substituted off) 34' |
Substitutes:
| GK | 23 | (Japan) Yohei Takaoka | (substituted on) 61' |
| GK | 97 | (Canada) Dayne St. Clair | (substituted on) 35' | (substituted off) 61' |
| DF | 2 | (Brazil) Guilherme Biro | (substituted on) 76' |
| DF | 5 | (Norway) Jakob Glesnes | (substituted on) 35' |
| MF | 6 | (Denmark) Jeppe Tverskov | (substituted on) 35' | (substituted off) 61' |
| FW | 8 | (United States) Diego Luna | (substituted on) 46' |
| FW | 9 | (Israel) Tai Baribo | (substituted on) 34' | (substituted off) 61' |
| DF | 12 | (United States) Miles Robinson | (substituted on) 46' |
| MF | 14 | (Mexico) Obed Vargas | (substituted on) 61' |
| FW | 17 | (Uruguay) Diego Rossi | (substituted on) 34' | (substituted off) 61' |
| MF | 22 | (Spain) Carles Gil | (substituted on) 61' |
| FW | 24 | (United States) Brian White | (substituted on) 61' |
| DF | 27 | (United States) Max Arfsten | (substituted on) 46' | (substituted off) 76' |
| MF | 29 | (Germany) Hany Mukhtar | (substituted on) 35' | (substituted off) 61' |
| DF | 30 | (United States) Alex Freeman | (substituted on) 61' |
| MF | 32 | (Argentina) Cristian Espinoza | (substituted on) 46' |
| FW | 77 | (Denmark) Philip Zinckernagel | (substituted on) 61' |
| FW | 87 | (Croatia) Marco Pašalić | (substituted on) 35' | (substituted off) 61' |
Manager:
(Spain) Nico Estévez

| GK | 1 | (Mexico) Luis Malagón | | (substituted off) 46' |
| RB | 3 | (Mexico) Israel Reyes | | (substituted off) 46' |
| CB | 93 | (Spain) Sergio Ramos (c) | | (substituted off) 46' |
| CB | 13 | (Brazil) Luan | | (substituted off) 46' |
| LB | 20 | (Mexico) Jesús Gallardo | | (substituted off) 46' |
| DM | 18 | (Brazil) Rodrigo Dourado | | (substituted off) 46' |
| CM | 8 | (Argentina) Agustín Palavecino | | (substituted off) 46' |
| CM | 10 | (Spain) Sergio Canales | | (substituted off) 46' |
| RW | 17 | (Argentina) Juan Brunetta | | (substituted off) 46' |
| CF | 9 | (Mexico) Ángel Sepúlveda | | (substituted off) 46' |
| LW | 25 | (Mexico) Roberto Alvarado | | (substituted off) 46' |
Substitutes:
| GK | 23 | (Colombia) Kevin Mier | (substituted on) 46' |
| DF | 2 | (Brazil) Joaquim | (substituted on) 46' |
| DF | 4 | (Colombia) Willer Ditta | (substituted on) 46' |
| DF | 5 | (Mexico) Alonso Aceves | (substituted on) 46' |
| MF | 6 | (Mexico) Kevin Castañeda | (substituted on) 46' | (substituted off) 76' |
| FW | 7 | (Uruguay) Brian Rodríguez | (substituted on) 46' |
| DF | 15 | (Brazil) Gustavo Ferrareis | (substituted on) 46' |
| FW | 16 | (United States) Alejandro Zendejas | (substituted on) 46' |
| FW | 19 | (Mexico) Gilberto Mora | (substituted on) 46' |
| MF | 26 | (Mexico) Alan Bautista | (substituted on) 76' |
| FW | 27 | (Colombia) Diber Cambindo | (substituted on) 46' |
| MF | 28 | (Mexico) Elías Montiel | (substituted on) 46' |
Manager:
(Brazil) André Jardine
