= Andrés Ayala (footballer, born 2000) =

Argentine professional footballer

Personal information
- Full name: Andrés Óscar Ayala
- Date of birth: 13 March 2000 (age 26)
- Place of birth: Berazategui, Argentina
- Height: 1.69 m (5 ft 7 in)
- Position: Defensive midfielder

Team information
- Current team: Arsenal Sarandí

Youth career
- Estudiantes

Senior career*
Years	Team	Apps	(Gls)
2019–2022	Estudiantes	0	(0)
2021	→ Agropecuario (loan)	23	(1)
2022	→ Ferro Carril Oeste (loan)	7	(0)
2023	Almagro	20	(0)
2024–	Arsenal Sarandí	13	(0)

International career
- Argentina U17
- Argentina U20
- * Club domestic league appearances and goals as of 17:54, 4 June 2025 (UTC)

Andrés Óscar Ayala (born 13 March 2000) is an Argentine professional footballer who plays as a defensive midfielder for Arsenal Sarandí.

== Club career ==
Ayala started his career with Estudiantes, having joined their academy at a young age. He was first promoted into the club's first-team squad in February 2019, with the defensive midfielder appearing on the substitute's bench for a Primera División match with Argentinos Juniors on 18 February; though manager Leandro Benítez didn't select him to come on in the 2–1 defeat. He went unused on the bench four further times up until December 2020. Ayala's senior debut eventually arrived on 23 December 2020, as he replaced brother David for the final thirteen minutes of a Copa de la Superliga play-off loss to Defensa y Justicia.

== International career ==
In January 2017, Ayala received a call-up from the Argentina U17s. Across the next eighteen months, Ayala was selected to train against the senior squad; including at the 2018 FIFA World Cup in Russia. Also in 2018, Ayala appeared at the COTIF Tournament with the U20s; a competition they won.

On 17 February 2021, Ayala was loaned out to Primera Nacional club Agropecuario until the end of the year. In January 2022, Ayala was loaned out once again, this time to Ferro Carril Oeste until the end of 2022.

== Personal life ==
Ayala's brother, David, is also a professional footballer; they both started their careers with Estudiantes. They have three other brothers, who also play football, and four sisters.

== Career statistics ==
As of 1 January 2021.

Appearances and goals by club, season and competition
Club	Season	League			Cup		League Cup		Continental		Other		Total	
Club	Season	Division	Apps	Goals	Apps	Goals	Apps	Goals	Apps	Goals	Apps	Goals	Apps	Goals
Estudiantes	2018–19	Primera División	0	0	0	0	0	0	—		0	0	0	0
Estudiantes	2019–20	Primera División	0	0	0	0	0	0	—		0	0	0	0
Estudiantes	2020–21 (Note: Soccerway counts Copa de la Liga Profesional appearances as league appearances.)	Primera División	0	0	0	0	1	0	—		0	0	1	0
Career total			0	0	0	0	1	0	—		0	0	1	0

== Honours ==
Argentina U20

- COTIF Tournament: 2018
