= David Ayala (footballer, born 2002) =

Argentine footballer (born 2002)

Personal information
- Date of birth: 26 July 2002 (age 24)
- Place of birth: Berazategui, Argentina
- Height: 1.70 m (5 ft 7 in)
- Position: Midfielder

Team information
- Current team: Inter Miami
- Number: 22

Youth career
- Estudiantes

Senior career*
| Years | Team | Apps | (Gls) |
| 2019–2022 | Estudiantes | 32 | (0) |
| 2022–2025 | Portland Timbers | 93 | (4) |
| 2022–2025 | Portland Timbers 2 | 2 | (0) |
| 2026– | Inter Miami | 9 | (0) |

International career^{‡}
| 2019 | Argentina U17 | 13 | (0) |
- * Club domestic league appearances and goals as of 22 August 2026 ‡ National team caps and goals as of 15 December 2019

David Ayala (born 26 July 2002) is an Argentine professional footballer who plays as a midfielder for Major League Soccer club Inter Miami.

== Club career ==
David Ayala made his professional debut in the Argentine Primera Division on Dec. 10, 2019 at the age of 17. He spent three seasons with Estudiantes de La Plata logging 32 appearances. The Portland Timbers acquired Ayala on February 1, 2022, as an MLS U22 Initiative signing. He made his debut on March 12th as a substitute in a home win over Austin FC. On April 29th, 2023, Ayala suffered a torn ACL in the 21st minute of an away match against St. Louis, which caused him to miss the remainder of the season. On August 1st, 2024, he scored his first goal as a Timber with a back post header from a flicked on corner kick in a Leagues Cup match against Colorado Rapids. His first MLS goal came a month and a half later in similar fashion against the same opposition. He earned a spot in MLS Team of Matchday 8 for his performance in a 4–2 win at Sporting KC, where scored the opener in the 10th minute before taking a shot that deflected off a teammate and in, registering as an assist. On June 8th, 2025, Ayala scored a 92nd-minute winner in a 2–1 win over St. Louis with a volley straight from a corner delivery. Ayala was recognized by fans a consistent quality performer for the Timbers. He was best known for his tackling and defensive work rate. "He looks nice, but not on the field," said his head coach Phil Neville, who referred to him as a rottweiler. Ayala also became known for passing ability as his time with the club went on.

On January 9th, 2026, it was announced that Inter Miami had acquired Ayala in a cash for player trade in exchange for $2,000,000 with $150,000 in potential bonuses and a sell-on fee percentage. Ayala only had one year left on his contract with the Timbers, and the move allowed him to be situated closer to family.

== Personal life ==
Ayala's brother, Andrés, is also a professional footballer.

== Career statistics ==
=== Club ===
As of 15 December 2019.

| Club | Season | League | | | Cup | | Continental | | Other | | Total | |
| Club | Season | Division | Apps | Goals | Apps | Goals | Apps | Goals | Apps | Goals | Apps | Goals |
|---|---|---|---|---|---|---|---|---|---|---|---|---|
| Estudiantes | 2019–20 | Primera División | 1 | 0 | 9 | 0 | – | | 0 | 0 | 10 | 0 |
| Estudiantes | 2021 | Primera División | 11 | 0 | 11 | 0 | – | | 0 | 0 | 22 | 0 |
| Portland Timbers | 2022 | MLS | 21 | 0 | 1 | 0 | – | | 0 | 0 | 22 | 0 |
| Portland Timbers | 2023 | MLS | 4 | 0 | 0 | 0 | – | | 0 | 0 | 4 | 0 |
| Portland Timbers | 2024 | MLS | 30 | 1 | 0 | 0 | 3 | 1 | 0 | 0 | 34 | 2 |
| Portland Timbers | 2025 | MLS | 33 | 2 | 0 | 0 | 1 | 0 | 0 | 0 | 34 | 2 |
| Career total | | | 100 | 3 | 21 | 0 | 4 | 1 | 0 | 0 | 1 | 0 |

== Honours ==
Inter Miami

- Campeones Cup: 2026
