= Brian White (soccer) =

American soccer player (born 1996)

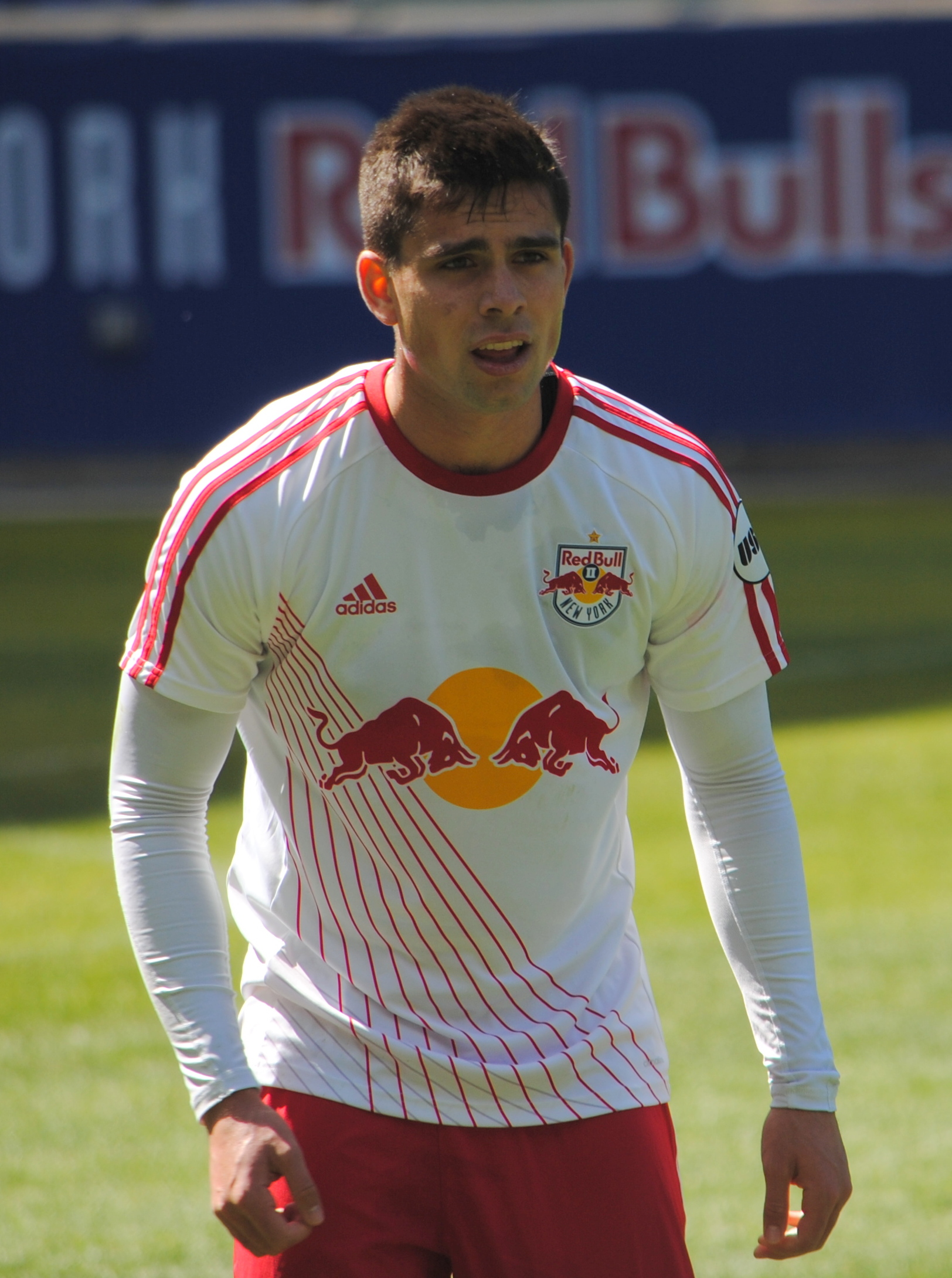
- White playing for New York Red Bulls II in 2018

Personal information
- Full name: Brian Michael White
- Date of birth: February 3, 1996 (age 30)
- Place of birth: Flemington, New Jersey, U.S.
- Height: 5 ft 11 in (1.80 m)
- Position: Striker

Team information
- Current team: Vancouver Whitecaps FC
- Number: 24

Youth career
- 2005–2013: PDA

College career
Years	Team	Apps	(Gls)
2014–2017	Duke Blue Devils	73	(23)

Senior career*
Years	Team	Apps	(Gls)
2015–2017	New York Red Bulls U-23	25	(21)
2018–2019	New York Red Bulls II	28	(11)
2018–2021	New York Red Bulls	47	(15)
2021–	Vancouver Whitecaps FC	167	(82)

International career^{‡}
2024–	United States	8	(1)
Medal record
Representing United States
Men's football
CONCACAF Gold Cup
Runner-up	2025 Canada–United States
- * Club domestic league appearances and goals as of November 1, 2026 ‡ National team caps and goals as of June 29, 2025

Brian Michael White (born February 3, 1996) is an American professional soccer player who plays as a striker for Major League Soccer club Vancouver Whitecaps FC and the United States national team.

== Early career ==
White grew up in Flemington, New Jersey where he attended Hunterdon Central Regional High School and played youth soccer for Players Development Academy (PDA) for nine years. He also played college soccer for four years at Duke University. While with Duke he scored 23 goals in 73 matches. White also played for the New York Red Bulls U-23 in the Premier Development League (PDL), where he scored 21 goals in 25 appearances. At the conclusion of the 2017 PDL season White was named league MVP and captured the Golden Boot award as he helped lead the team to the PDL regular-season title.

== Club career ==
=== New York Red Bulls ===
On January 19, 2018, White was drafted in the first round of the 2018 MLS SuperDraft, by New York Red Bulls. On March 15, 2018, White signed his first professional contract with New York Red Bulls II. He made his professional debut on March 17, 2018, for United Soccer League side New York Red Bulls II, starting in a 2–1 win over Toronto FC II. White scored his first goal as a professional on March 24, 2018, in a 3–1 loss to Atlanta United 2. On March 31, 2018, White scored the opening goal of the match on a penalty kick and assisted on two other goals in New York's 5–2 victory over Charleston Battery. On April 14, 2018, White scored two goals in a 5–0 victory over Tampa Bay Rowdies.

On August 4, 2018, it was announced that White had signed an MLS contract with New York Red Bulls, earning promotion to the first team after scoring eight goals and recording five assists in 22 matches with Red Bulls II. On August 29, 2018, White made his first start for New York Red Bulls, scoring the lone goal in a 1–0 victory over Houston Dynamo.

During the 2019 season he was loaned to New York Red Bulls II and on March 24, 2019, White scored his first goal of the season in a 1–1 draw with Nashville SC. He was recalled to the first team and due to injuries to starter Bradley Wright-Phillips he became a regular for New York during the 2019 season as he appeared in 21 games and scored nine goals.

During the 2020 season White appeared in 19 matches scoring a team high six goals. He tallied late-match equalizers in consecutive games against Orlando City on October 18 and Chicago Fire on October 24. White was named New York Red Bulls Offensive Player of the Year for the 2020 season on December 21, 2020.

=== Vancouver Whitecaps FC ===
On June 2, 2021, White was traded to Vancouver Whitecaps FC in exchange for $400,000 in General Allocation Money and a possible additional $100,000 in conditional General Allocation Money.

On April 27, 2024, White became the Vancouver Whitecaps' all-time leading MLS scorer with a goal against his former club the New York Red Bulls. It was White's 36th MLS goal for the Whitecaps and his fifth of the season.

White scored four goals in a 5–1 Whitecaps win over Austin FC on April 12, 2025.

== International career ==
White made his debut for the senior United States national team on January 20, 2024, in a friendly against Slovenia. On January 22, 2025, White scored his first international goal, the first of a 3–0 friendly victory over Costa Rica.

== Career statistics ==
=== Club ===
As of match played November 1, 2026

Appearances and goals by club, season and competition
Club	Season	League			National cup (Note: Includes Canadian Championship)		Continental		Other		Total	
Club	Season	Division	Apps	Goals	Apps	Goals	Apps	Goals	Apps	Goals	Apps	Goals
New York Red Bulls U-23	2015	PDL	11	4	–		–		–		11	4
New York Red Bulls U-23	2017	PDL	14	17	–		–		1 (Note: Appearance in PDL playoffs)	0	15	17
New York Red Bulls U-23	Total		25	21	–		–		1	0	26	21
New York Red Bulls II	2018	USL	26	10	–		–		–		26	10
New York Red Bulls II	2019	USL	2	1	–		–		–		2	1
New York Red Bulls II	Total		28	11	–		–		–		28	11
New York Red Bulls	2018	MLS	5	1	0	0	–		1 (Note: Appearance(s) in MLS Cup playoffs)	0	6	1
New York Red Bulls	2019	MLS	19	9	0	0	1 (Note: Appearance(s) in CONCACAF Champions League/Cup)	0	1	0	21	9
New York Red Bulls	2020	MLS	18	5	–		–		1	1	19	6
New York Red Bulls	2021	MLS	5	0	–		–		–		5	0
New York Red Bulls	Total		47	15	0	0	1	0	3	1	51	16
Vancouver Whitecaps FC	2021	MLS	27	12	1	0	–		1	0	29	12
Vancouver Whitecaps FC	2022	MLS	26	4	3	3	–		–		29	7
Vancouver Whitecaps FC	2023	MLS	32	15	2	1	4	2	5 (Note: Three appearances and one goal in Leagues Cup, two appearances and one goal in MLS Cup playoffs)	2	43	20
Vancouver Whitecaps FC	2024	MLS	30	15	5	0	2	0	7 (Note: Three appearances in Leagues Cup, four appearances and one goal in MLS Cup playoffs)	1	44	16
Vancouver Whitecaps FC	2025	MLS	21	16	3	1	9	6	3	2	36	25
Vancouver Whitecaps FC	2026	MLS	31	20	4	1	4	0	2 (Note: Appearances in Leagues Cup)	0	41	21
Vancouver Whitecaps FC	Total		167	82	18	6	19	8	18	5	222	101
Career total			267	129	18	6	20	8	22	6	327	149

=== International ===
As of match played June 29, 2025

Appearances and goals by national team and year
National team	Year	Apps	Goals
United States	2024	1	0
United States	2025	7	1
Total		8	1

List of international goals scored by Brian White
No.	Date	Venue	Cap	Opponent	Score	Result	Competition
1	January 22, 2025	Inter&Co Stadium, Orlando, United States	3	Costa Rica	1–0	3–0	Friendly

== Honors ==
New York Red Bulls

- Supporters' Shield: 2018

Vancouver Whitecaps FC

- Canadian Championship: 2022, 2023, 2024, 2025

Individual

- MLS All-Star: 2025
