= Vanni Sartini =

Italian football manager (born 1976)

- Sartini in 2026

Personal information
- Date of birth: 14 November 1976 (age 49)
- Place of birth: Florence, Italy

Team information
- Current team: Halifax Wanderers FC (head coach)

Managerial career
- Years: Team
- 2019–2020: Vancouver Whitecaps FC (assistant)
- 2020–2021: Vancouver Whitecaps FC U23
- 2021–2024: Vancouver Whitecaps FC
- 2025–: Halifax Wanderers FC

Vanni Sartini (born 14 November 1976) is an Italian professional football coach, who is the head coach of Canadian Premier League club Halifax Wanderers FC.

== Early life ==
Sartini was born in Florence, Italy, to a teenage couple - both his parents were 17 at the time of his birth. Inspired by his father, a semi-professional footballer who also worked as the photo archivist for a local newspaper, Sartini started playing football as a goalkeeper.

He went on to feature regularly in the Italian amateur leagues, while taking up several side jobs, including as a marketing rep for a software company and as a courier, in order to support himself financially.

== Coaching career ==
=== Early coaching career ===
After retiring from his playing career, Sartini started his coaching career in 2008, when he was appointed by A.S. Mezzana as a head coach. He spent three seasons there, before taking the same role at fellow amateur club Luco di Mugello.

Meanwhile, in 2010 he began working for the Italian Football Federation as a coaching instructor at the Federal Technical Center in Coverciano. During his stint, he hosted a wide variety of international coaching courses, focusing on macro-areas such as women's football, coaching formation, goalkeeping training and athletic training. At the same time, he worked in the opposition analysis department for the Italian under-17, under-19 and under-21 national teams.

Between 2012 and 2015, Sartini was also a member of Davide Nicola's staff during his managing spells at Livorno and Bari, serving as a match analyst in the former one and as an assistant coach in the latter.

Shortly after obtaining his own coaching badges, including a UEFA Pro Licence, in 2016 Sartini was offered a job by the United States Soccer Federation, where he led the U.S. Soccer Pro License Coaching Course until 2018.

=== Vancouver Whitecaps FC ===
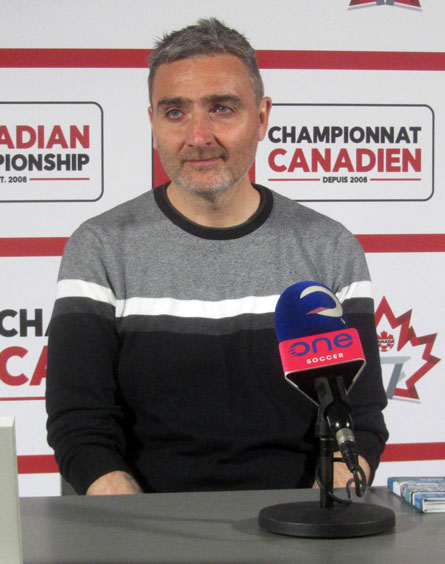
Sartini in 2023

On 1 January 2019, Sartini joined Major League Soccer side Vancouver Whitecaps FC, as an assistant coach to Marc Dos Santos.

On 8 September 2020, he was appointed as the head coach of the club's U-23 team, as well as the Academy's director of methodology.

On 27 August 2021, Sartini took over as interim coach of the Whitecaps' first team, after the sacking of Marc Dos Santos. On 29 August, Sartini took charge for the first time as Whitecaps' head coach in their league match against Real Salt Lake, which ended in a 4–1 victory at BC Place. With the squad being at the bottom of the Western Conference's league table at the time of his appointment, Sartini managed the side to seven wins, five draws and two losses until the end of the regular season, collecting a total of 26 points in 14 matches and helping the club qualify for the Playoffs, although the team eventually lost to Sporting Kansas City in the first round.

On 30 November 2021, Whitecaps announced that Sartini would officially become the club's new head coach, having signed a contract until the 2023 season.

On 26 July 2022, the Italian manager won the first trophy of his career as Whitecaps won the Canadian Championship, following a 5–3 win (on aggregate) over Toronto FC after a penalty shoot-out in the final match.

On 8 June 2023, Sartini guided the Canadian team to their second Canadian Championship title in a row, thanks to a 2–1 win over CF Montréal in the final match. On 5 November, during an MLS Cup playoff game against Los Angeles FC, Sartini received his first red card in Major League Soccer for verbally abusing referee Tim Ford in the stoppage time of the second half; moments earlier, Ford had accidentally collided with a Whitecaps player, preventing them from defending a counter-attack from the opponents that ended up in a goal, which was later overturned due to a delayed offside decision.

On 26 September 2024, Sartini led the Whitecaps to the victory of their third consecutive Canadian Championship title, following a 4–2 win on penalties over Toronto FC in the final match. On 25 November, the club announced that they had parted ways with Sartini at the end of the 2024 season: over his time in Vancouver, he collected an overall record of 57 wins, 51 losses and 39 draws across all competitions, leading the club to qualify for the MLS Playoffs in three seasons and win three consecutive Canadian Championships.

=== Halifax Wanderers FC ===
On 10 December 2025, Sartini was appointed as both head coach and general manager of Canadian Premier League side Halifax Wanderers FC.

== Manager profile ==
"We had a game in two days. If I step into the locker room and act like I’m the boss, everyone’s going to say, 'Who the f**k are you?' So, I called a group of players, the leaders, who are respected, and asked them: 'Tell me, what is the situation? Tell me.' I wanted them to know that we’re all on the same page. The players are the leaders."

— Vanni Sartini, breaking down his approach to team talk in the wake of his first game in charge of Vancouver Whitecaps FC in August 2021.

During his coaching stint at Vancouver Whitecaps FC, Sartini mainly used a 3–4–1–2 formation, with an organised system based on zonal marking, high pressing and a quick and direct style of play, which allowed his team to break through the middle of the field and create chances via counter-attacks.

He named fellow Italian coach Renzo Ulivieri as his biggest influence: the two worked together at the Italian Football Federation's Technical Center from 2010 to 2016. When asked to elaborate on Ulivieri's impact on him, Sartini stated that he taught him how to analyse the opponent's tactics meticulously, saying quote, "What I learned from him is the desire to go deep into detail, try to challenge yourself every time and to find the new ways, new ideas. This desire to know everything."

The Italian has also gained notoriety for his eccentric personality, his enthusiastic interactions with the fan-base and his man management skills, showing respect for the experienced players in the locker room while often giving motivational speeches to encourage the whole team.

== Personal life ==
Sartini is fluent in his native Italian, English and Spanish. He cited his interest in languages and common knowledge as the main reason behind his decision to learn English as a kid, saying, "I like to travel, and I was the only one with my friends that was an English speaker, so I was always the one who spoke with everyone. I have the urge to know things I don't know."

As a frequent reader, he has declared to be mainly interested in political philosophy and current affairs. He has described himself as an atheist and a socialist, pointing at his working class family background as the main factor behind his political formation, stating, "If there was no kind of social security or welfare state, I wouldn’t be here now. I think [there] should be even more [opportunities] for everyone. That’s not happening right now in the world. [My] desire to improve the world is what made me a socialist." He also dated his passion for constructive debate to a series of classes hosted by one of his teachers in high school, and compared politics to soccer tactics, by stated, "There’s a lot of ways to make your team play well, but there’s only one way that you really believe is the right one.”

He is a fan of Italian soccer club Fiorentina.

== Coaching statistics ==
As of 9 November 2024

Coaching record by club and tenure
Team	From	To	Record					Ref.
Team	From	To	P	W	D	L	Win %	Ref.
Vancouver Whitecaps FC	27 August 2021	25 November 2024	147	59	38	50	40.1	
Total			147	59	38	50	40.1	

== Honours ==
=== Manager ===
Vancouver Whitecaps FC

- Canadian Championship: 2022, 2023, 2024
