= Yohei Takaoka =

Japanese footballer (born 1996)

Yohei Takaoka 高丘 陽平
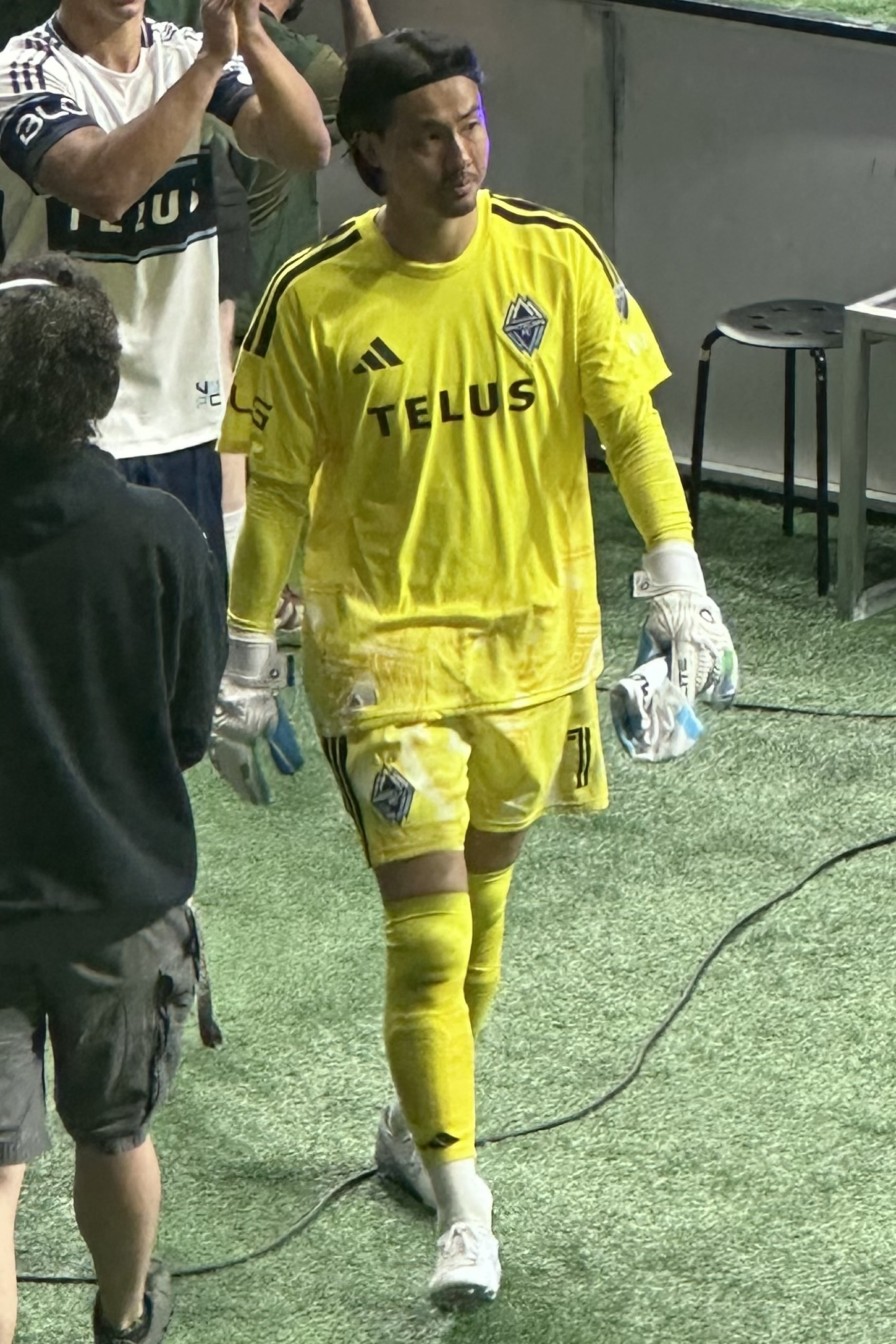
- Takaoka in 2026

Personal information
- Date of birth: 16 March 1996 (age 30)
- Place of birth: Aoba-ku, Yokohama, Japan
- Height: 1.82 m (6 ft 0 in)
- Position: Goalkeeper

Team information
- Current team: Vancouver Whitecaps
- Number: 1

Youth career
- 2004–2007: Azamino FC
- 2008–2013: Yokohama FC

Senior career*
| Years | Team | Apps | (Gls) |
| 2014–2018 | Yokohama FC | 41 | (0) |
| 2014–2015 | → J.League U-22 Selection (loan) | 4 | (0) |
| 2018 | → Sagan Tosu (loan) | 0 | (0) |
| 2019–2020 | Sagan Tosu | 40 | (0) |
| 2020–2022 | Yokohama F. Marinos | 71 | (0) |
| 2023– | Vancouver Whitecaps | 119 | (0) |
- * Club domestic league appearances and goals as of Aug 25, 2026

Yohei Takaoka (高丘 陽平, Takaoka Yōhei; born 16 March 1996) is a Japanese professional footballer who plays as a goalkeeper for Major League Soccer club Vancouver Whitecaps.

== Career ==
=== Youth ===
Takaoka was born in Aoba-ku, Yokohama, Japan.

Takaoka begin his first youth career with Azamino FC from 2004 until 2007. He joined Yokohama FC Junior in 2008.

=== Yokohama FC ===
Takaoka was promoted to youth in 2011 after playing for Yokohama FC Junior. On 10 May 2013, he registered with the top team as a type 2 register player.

From the 2014 season, Takaoka was officially promoted to the first team. In February of the same year, he was registered as a player in the J League U-22 selection to participate in J3 League. After the promotion, Yuta Minami was the regular goalkeeper and Tsubasa Shibuya, who was one year older than him, served as a backup. Takaoka changed his uniform number from 26 to 1, took the regular goalkeeper from Minami and participated in 41 games.

=== Sagan Tosu ===
On 26 March 2018, Takaoka joined J1 Club, Sagan Tosu on loan. After the transfer, he became a backup for Shuichi Gonda and ended up participating in J. League Cup three games, but after the season ended, he was officially permanently transferred to Sagan Tosu.

In 2019, when Gonda left the team, Takuo Ōkubo, a new member from FC Tokyo, was appointed in the early stages of the game, so he was on the reserve, but when Okubo transferred to Shimizu S-Pulse in the summer, he became a regular. After that, he scored in every game. In 2020, Tatsuya Morita joined Matsumoto Yamaga FC and the opportunity to participate decreased compared to last season, but he showed good saves in the games he participated in and competed for the position.

=== Yokohama F. Marinos ===
On 23 October 2020, Takaoka announced his official permanent transfer to Yokohama F. Marinos. After joining, he became a regular player by suppressing Yuji Kajikawa and Hirotsugu Nakabayashi, but suffered three consecutive losses, including losing three goals in two consecutive games from the match against Sanfrecce Hiroshima in Matchweek 28, which he participated in for the first time after the transfer and returned from rental in subsequent games. Lost position to Powell Obinna Obi. Takaoka returned to the starting lineup in Matchweek 30 facing against Kawasaki Frontale in the battle, he committed a hand outside the penalty area just before the end of the first half and was sent off. Obi was mainly used in the 2020 AFC Champions League and after deciding to advance to the round of 16, he only participated in one game against Sydney FC and the game he participated in after joining ended in a bitter result of not winning.

In 2021, when his uniform number was changed to 1, Takaoka handed over the starting lineup for the opening of the league to Obi, but was selected as the starting lineup in the J. League Cup group stage match against Vegalta Sendai. The game won 1-0, marking his first victory and first shutout since joining. After that, he mainly participated in cup matches, but when he was selected as the starting lineup in the league match against Shonan Bellmare in Section 7, he took the position from Obi and played an active role as a regular.

The 2022 season is the only team to participate in all games in the league match. He showed a performance in which he conceded 35 goals, the lowest tie in the league and contributed to the team's fifth league championship in three years. He was selected in the Best Eleven. It was the first time in 29 years since Shigetatsu Matsunaga (currently Yokohama F. Marinos Goalkeeper coach) was established in 1993 that a Goalkeeper belonging to Yokohama F. Marinos was selected as the best eleven.

=== Vancouver Whitecaps FC ===
On 18 February 2023, Takaoka officially announced his transfer to a Major League Soccer club Vancouver Whitecaps FC ahead of the 2023 season. two seasons later, he was selected along with three of his teammates to be part of the 26-man roster for the 2025 MLS All-Star Game. Takaoka started for the Whitecaps during MLS Cup 2025, which they lost 3-1 to Inter Miami CF. He signed an extension with the Whitecaps on 18 December 2025 until June 2027.

== Career statistics ==
As of 25 August 2026

Appearances and goals by club, season and competition
| Club | Season | League | | | National cup (Note: Includes Emperor's Cup, Canadian Championship) | | League cup (Note: Includes J.League Cup) | | Continental | | Other | | Total | |
| Club | Season | Division | Apps | Goals | Apps | Goals | Apps | Goals | Apps | Goals | Apps | Goals | Apps | Goals |
|---|---|---|---|---|---|---|---|---|---|---|---|---|---|---|
| Yokohama FC | 2014 | J2 League | 0 | 0 | 0 | 0 | — | | — | | — | | 0 | 0 |
| Yokohama FC | 2015 | J2 League | 0 | 0 | 0 | 0 | — | | — | | — | | 0 | 0 |
| Yokohama FC | 2016 | J2 League | 0 | 0 | 1 | 0 | — | | — | | — | | 1 | 0 |
| Yokohama FC | 2017 | J2 League | 41 | 0 | 0 | 0 | — | | — | | — | | 41 | 0 |
| Yokohama FC | 2018 | J2 League | 0 | 0 | 0 | 0 | — | | — | | — | | 0 | 0 |
| Yokohama FC | Total | | 41 | 0 | 1 | 0 | 0 | 0 | 0 | 0 | 0 | 0 | 42 | 0 |
| Sagan Tosu (loan) | 2018 | J1 League | 0 | 0 | 0 | 0 | 3 | 0 | — | | — | | 3 | 0 |
| Sagan Tosu | 2019 | J1 League | 24 | 0 | 2 | 0 | 6 | 0 | — | | — | | 32 | 0 |
| Sagan Tosu | 2020 | J1 League | 16 | 0 | 0 | 0 | 1 | 0 | — | | — | | 17 | 0 |
| Sagan Tosu | Total | | 40 | 0 | 2 | 0 | 7 | 0 | 0 | 0 | 0 | 0 | 49 | 0 |
| Yokohama F. Marinos | 2020 | J1 League | 4 | 0 | 0 | 0 | 1 | 0 | 1 (Note: Appearance(s) in AFC Champions League) | 0 | — | | 6 | 0 |
| Yokohama F. Marinos | 2021 | J1 League | 33 | 0 | 1 | 0 | 4 | 0 | — | | — | | 38 | 0 |
| Yokohama F. Marinos | 2022 | J1 League | 34 | 0 | 0 | 0 | 7 | 0 | 7 | 0 | — | | 48 | 0 |
| Yokohama F. Marinos | Total | | 71 | 0 | 1 | 0 | 12 | 0 | 8 | 0 | 0 | 0 | 92 | 0 |
| Vancouver Whitecaps FC | 2023 | Major League Soccer | 33 | 0 | 3 | 0 | — | | 2 (Note: Appearances in CONCACAF Champions League) | 0 | 4 (Note: Appearances in MLS Cup playoffs) | 0 | 42 | 0 |
| Vancouver Whitecaps FC | 2024 | Major League Soccer | 33 | 0 | 0 | 0 | — | | 2 | 0 | 4 | 0 | 39 | 0 |
| Vancouver Whitecaps FC | 2025 | Major League Soccer | 34 | 0 | 0 | 0 | — | | 7 | 0 | 5 | 0 | 46 | 0 |
| Vancouver Whitecaps FC | 2026 | Major League Soccer | 19 | 0 | 0 | 0 | — | | 7 | 0 | 5 | 0 | 46 | 0 |
| Vancouver Whitecaps FC | Total | | 119 | 0 | 3 | 0 | 0 | 0 | 11 | 0 | 13 | 0 | 127 | 0 |
| Career total | | | 271 | 0 | 7 | 0 | 22 | 0 | 19 | 0 | 13 | 0 | 313 | 0 |

== Honours ==
Yokohama F. Marinos

- J1 League: 2022

Vancouver Whitecaps

- Canadian Championship: 2023,2024,2025

Individual

- MLS All-Star: 2025
- J.League Best XI: 2022
