= Cascadia Cup =

North American soccer trophy

- The Cascadia Cup logo
- Location: Pacific Northwest
- Teams: Portland Timbers; Seattle Sounders FC; Vancouver Whitecaps FC
- First meeting: 2004
- Stadiums: BC Place; Lumen Field; Providence Park

Statistics
- Most wins: Overall: Vancouver (9 titles); MLS era: Vancouver (6 titles); USL era: Vancouver (3 titles)
- Longest win streak: Seattle (3, 2018–2021) (Note: Trophy not awarded in 2020 due to COVID-19 pandemic)
- Current win streak: Vancouver (2, 2025–2026)

The Cascadia Cup is the name of the trophy created in 2004 by supporters of the Portland Timbers, Seattle Sounders, and Vancouver Whitecaps, which is awarded each season to the best soccer team in the Pacific Northwest. The cup is named for the Cascadia region in which all three teams are located. The Timbers, Sounders, and Whitecaps have roots dating to the days of the original North American Soccer League. It was first contested in 2004, and was claimed by the Whitecaps. In 2011 the competition continued with the now Major League Soccer (MLS) sides Portland Timbers, Seattle Sounders FC, and Vancouver Whitecaps FC.

== History ==
In 2004, fan-based organizations supporting the Seattle Sounders, Portland Timbers and Vancouver Whitecaps sponsored the creation of a 2-foot-tall silver cup to be awarded annually to the club that finishes with the best record in the season series between the three rivals. From 2004 to 2006, the Cascadia Cup competition included all scheduled regular season A-League and later USL-1 matches played between the Sounders, Timbers, and Whitecaps.

In 2007, the Virginia Beach Mariners folded just before the season started, leaving the USL 1st Division to scramble to fix the season schedule. The result was an unbalanced schedule, and as such it was decided to adjust the Cascadia Cup format for that season. Fans of all three Cascadian teams agreed to make only the last home and last away matches between constituent clubs count toward the Cup.

In 2008 the clubs reverted to playing each other an equal three times each. The Cascadia Cup competition once again included all scheduled regular season USL-1 matches played between the three rivals.

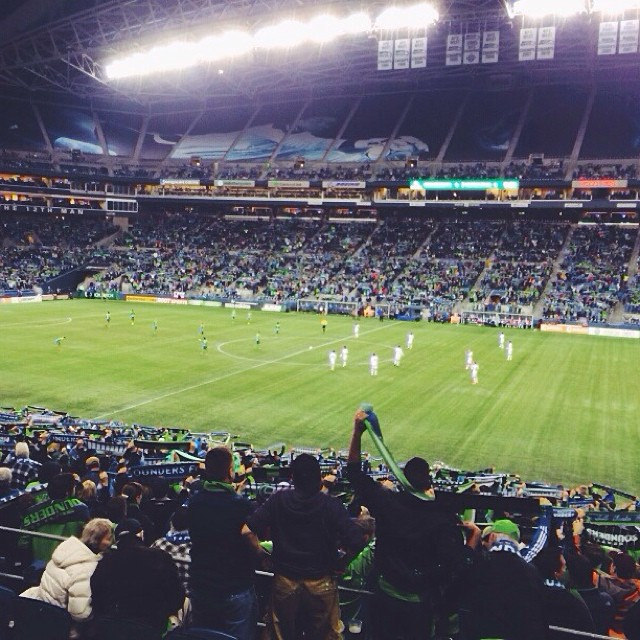
Seattle lost a chance to clinch the 2011 Cascadia Cup in their match against Vancouver on October 9, 2013, but would go on to win it later in the season.

The Seattle Sounders of the USL-1 were made defunct in 2009 due to the introduction of the MLS expansion franchise of the same name. In 2009, it was announced that expansion teams would be allotted to Vancouver and Portland. Both teams were named after their predecessors, ensuring the continuation of the rivalry. Supporters of the Timbers and Whitecaps decided to continue the Cascadia Cup without the Sounders for two years while playing in the USL. In 2009, supporters of the Timbers and Whitecaps only included regular season USL-1 matches played between the teams and Portland won the cup for the first time. Some Sounders supporters wished to include a preseason victory over Vancouver and a US Open Cup match win at Portland for consideration in the cup standings while others believed that the Cascadia Cup competition should be suspended until 2011. Portland won the Cup for a second consecutive year in 2010.

The 2011 MLS season marked the first season since 2008 in which all three teams would be in the same league. Seattle claimed their third title by going undefeated in Cascadia Cup play – coming from behind to win both of their road games in Portland and Vancouver while earning draws at home.

For the 2012 MLS season the league changed to an unbalanced schedule. As a result, each team would play the other two Cascadia club three times each. Portland had four games at home while Vancouver and Seattle had three and two, respectively. It was decided by the supporters groups to count all matches equally. Portland won the cup in Vancouver on October 21, 2012, with their only away win of their 2012 season. It was the Timbers' third time hoisting the cup, and the first with the Sounders in the competition.

For seven straight finals between 2015 and 2021, the Western Conference representative in the MLS Cup or the MLS is Back Tournament was from Cascadia. This streak came to an end in 2022 as all three teams failed to qualify for the playoffs. 2022 also marked the first time since they joined MLS that all three missed the playoffs in the same season.

The Cascadia Cup Council decided that 2020 matches not played in front of supporters, including the MLS is Back Tournament, would not count towards Cascadia Cup standings.

=== Trademark dispute ===
In December 2012, MLS filed a trademark claim for rights to the name "Cascadia Cup". This caused an immediate reaction from the three main supporters groups—the Timbers Army, Emerald City Supporters, and the Vancouver Southsiders—that had created the original competition. This prompted them to form a legal entity called the Cascadia Cup Council, whose sole purpose was to obtain and retain the legal rights to the name "Cascadia Cup". Releases by MLS indicate that their trademark plan was an altruistic attempt to protect the Cascadia Cup from abuse by third parties, a claim that was disputed by the contest-organizing fan groups. Those same groups later had discussions with MLS leadership in an attempt to resolve the issue, and in July 2013 both MLS and the supporters groups announced an agreement that the council would own the trademark and no monetization would occur without the agreement of all parties.

== Scoring ==
In most years since all three teams have been in MLS (2011–present), all of the games between the Cascadia teams count in Cascadia Cup standings. In some years, however, some of the matchups are uneven, with more games between some pairs of teams than others. In 2018, for instance, the Timbers-Sounders matchup was played three times but the Whitecaps played the other two teams only twice each. To keep the Cup competition balanced in these years, only a subset of games count toward the Cup standings, with the supporters groups agreeing before the season which games to count. In 2018, for instance, the final two games of each matchup were the ones that counted, and the initial Timbers-Sounders game on May 13 was excluded.

The winner each year is decided by these criteria, in order:

- Greater number of points in all Cascadia Cup matches.
- Greater number of points earned in matches between teams tied on points.
- Greater goal difference in matches between teams tied on points.
- Greater number of goals scored in matches between teams tied on points.
- Reapply previous three criteria if two or more teams are still tied.
- Greater goal difference in all Cascadia Cup matches.
- Greater number of goals scored in all Cascadia Cup matches.
- Smaller number of disciplinary points in all Cascadia Cup matches (yellow = 1 point, red = 2 points).

== Title performance ==
=== Titles won ===
Club	Titles	USL era	MLS era	Years won
Vancouver Whitecaps	9	3	6	2004, 2005, 2008, 2013, 2014, 2016, 2023, 2025, 2026
Seattle Sounders	7	2	5	2006, 2007, 2011, 2015, 2018, 2019, 2021
Portland Timbers	6	2	4	2009, 2010, 2012, 2017, 2022, 2024

=== Annual results ===
Year	Champions	Second	Third
USL era
2004	Vancouver Whitecaps	Portland Timbers	Seattle Sounders
2005	Vancouver Whitecaps	Portland Timbers	Seattle Sounders
2006	Seattle Sounders	Vancouver Whitecaps	Portland Timbers
2007	Seattle Sounders	Vancouver Whitecaps	Portland Timbers
2008	Vancouver Whitecaps	Seattle Sounders	Portland Timbers
USL era (Seattle ineligible)
2009	Portland Timbers	Vancouver Whitecaps	
2010	Portland Timbers	Vancouver Whitecaps	
MLS era
2011	Seattle Sounders FC	Portland Timbers	Vancouver Whitecaps FC
2012	Portland Timbers	Seattle Sounders FC	Vancouver Whitecaps FC
2013	Vancouver Whitecaps FC	Portland Timbers	Seattle Sounders FC
2014	Vancouver Whitecaps FC	Seattle Sounders FC	Portland Timbers
2015	Seattle Sounders FC	Vancouver Whitecaps FC	Portland Timbers
2016	Vancouver Whitecaps FC	Portland Timbers	Seattle Sounders FC
2017	Portland Timbers	Seattle Sounders FC	Vancouver Whitecaps FC
2018	Seattle Sounders FC	Vancouver Whitecaps FC	Portland Timbers
2019	Seattle Sounders FC	Portland Timbers	Vancouver Whitecaps FC
2020	Not awarded due to the COVID-19 pandemic		
2021	Seattle Sounders FC	Portland Timbers	Vancouver Whitecaps FC
2022	Portland Timbers	Vancouver Whitecaps FC	Seattle Sounders FC
2023	Vancouver Whitecaps FC	Portland Timbers	Seattle Sounders FC
2024	Portland Timbers	Seattle Sounders FC	Vancouver Whitecaps FC
2025	Vancouver Whitecaps FC	Seattle Sounders FC	Portland Timbers
2026	Vancouver Whitecaps FC	Portland Timbers	Seattle Sounders FC

=== League standings finishes ===
Sounders Timbers Whitecaps

USL First Division
P.	2004 (Note: Western Conference results.)	2005	2006	2007	2008	2009	2010
1	1			*1		*1	
2	*2			2	*2		
3		*3					
4	4	4	4				*4
5		5					5
6					6		
7			*7	7		7	
8							
9							
10							
11			11		11		
12							

MLS Western Conference
P.	2011	2012	2013	2014	2015	2016	2017	2018	2019	2020	2021	2022	2023	2024	2025	2026
1			1	1			*1									*1
2	*2				2		2	*2	*2	2	*2		2		*2	
3		3			3		3			3						
4			4		*4	4					4			4		
5		5		*5				5							5	
6	6			6					6		6		*6			
7			*7			7										7
8		*8				*8		8				*8		8	8	8
9	9									9		9		*9		
10													10			
11												11				
12									12							
13																
14																
15																

• Total: Seattle with 10 highest finishes, Portland with 6, and Vancouver with 6.
• Finishes with an asterisk (*) indicate winning the Cascadia Cup.
• Border indicates playoff line.

== Season by season breakdown ==
=== USL era ===
2004
Team	Pld	W	L	D	GF	GA	GD	Pts
Vancouver Whitecaps	8	4	3	1	7	6	+1	13
Portland Timbers	8	4	4	0	10	11	−1	12
Seattle Sounders	8	3	4	1	9	9	0	10

Source: "Cascadia Cup". cascadiacup.soccer. January 2004.

2005
Team	Pld	W	L	D	GF	GA	GD	Pts
Vancouver Whitecaps	8	2	0	6	10	5	+5	12
Portland Timbers	8	2	3	3	10	15	−5	9
Seattle Sounders	8	1	2	5	7	7	0	8

Source: "Cascadia Cup". cascadiacup.soccer. January 2005.

2006
Team	Pld	W	L	D	GF	GA	GD	Pts
Seattle Sounders	8	4	2	2	13	10	+3	14
Vancouver Whitecaps	8	3	2	3	10	8	+2	12
Portland Timbers	8	1	4	3	6	11	−5	6

Source: "Cascadia Cup". cascadiacup.soccer. January 2006.

2007
Team	Pld	W	L	D	GF	GA	GD	Pts	SEA	VAN	POR
Seattle Sounders	4	2	0	2	7	4	+3	8	—	1–0	2–0
Vancouver Whitecaps	4	0	1	3	2	3	−1	3	2–2	—	0–0
Portland Timbers	4	0	1	3	2	4	−2	3	2–2	0–0	—

Source: "Cascadia Cup". cascadiacup.soccer. January 2007.

2008
Team	Pld	W	L	D	GF	GA	GD	Pts
Vancouver Whitecaps	6	4	1	1	9	6	+3	13
Seattle Sounders	6	2	2	2	5	5	0	8
Portland Timbers	6	1	4	1	4	7	−3	4

Source: "Cascadia Cup". cascadiacup.soccer. January 2008.

=== USL/MLS split (Seattle ineligible) ===
2009
Team	Pld	W	L	D	GF	GA	GD	Pts
Portland Timbers	3	2	1	0	3	1	+2	6
Vancouver Whitecaps	3	1	2	0	1	3	−2	3

Source: "Cascadia Cup". cascadiacup.soccer. January 2009.

2010
Team	Pld	W	L	D	GF	GA	GD	Pts
Portland Timbers	4	2	0	2	6	4	+2	8
Vancouver Whitecaps	4	0	2	2	4	6	−2	2

Source: "Cascadia Cup". cascadiacup.soccer. January 2010.

=== Major League Soccer era ===
2011
Team	Pld	W	L	D	GF	GA	GD	Pts	SEA	POR	VAN
Seattle Sounders FC	4	2	0	2	9	6	+3	8	—	1–1	2–2
Portland Timbers	4	2	1	1	6	5	+1	7	2–3	—	2–1
Vancouver Whitecaps FC	4	0	3	1	4	8	−4	1	1–3	0–1	—

Source: "Cascadia Cup". cascadiacup.soccer. January 2011.

2012
Team	Pld	W	L	D	GF	GA	GD	Pts
Portland Timbers	6	3	1	2	7	7	0	11
Seattle Sounders FC	6	2	1	3	9	5	+4	9
Vancouver Whitecaps FC	6	0	3	3	4	8	−4	3

Source: "Cascadia Cup". cascadiacup.soccer. January 2012.

2013
Team	Pld	W	L	D	GF	GA	GD	Pts
Vancouver Whitecaps FC	6	2	1	3	13	9	+4	9
Portland Timbers	6	1	1	4	7	7	0	7
Seattle Sounders FC	6	2	3	1	6	10	−4	7

Source: "Cascadia Cup". cascadiacup.soccer. January 2013.

2014
Team	Pld	W	L	D	GF	GA	GD	Pts
Vancouver Whitecaps FC	6	3	2	1	8	11	−3	10
Seattle Sounders FC	6	2	2	2	12	10	+2	8
Portland Timbers	6	2	3	1	15	14	+1	7

Source: "Cascadia Cup". cascadiacup.soccer. January 2014.

2015
Team	Pld	W	L	D	GF	GA	GD	Pts
Seattle Sounders FC	6	4	2	0	9	8	+1	12
Vancouver Whitecaps FC	6	2	2	2	6	7	−1	8
Portland Timbers	6	1	3	2	7	7	0	5

Source: "Cascadia Cup". cascadiacup.soccer. January 2015.

2016
Team	Pld	W	L	D	GF	GA	GD	Pts
Vancouver Whitecaps FC	6	3	3	0	11	10	+1	9
Portland Timbers	6	3	3	0	14	14	0	9
Seattle Sounders FC	6	3	3	0	10	11	−1	9

Source: "Cascadia Cup". cascadiacup.soccer. January 2016.

2017
Team	Pld	W	L	D	GF	GA	GD	Pts
Portland Timbers	6	3	1	2	8	6	+2	11
Seattle Sounders FC	6	2	1	3	8	5	+3	9
Vancouver Whitecaps FC	6	1	4	1	6	11	−5	4

Source: "Cascadia Cup". cascadiacup.soccer. January 2017.

2018
Team	Pld	W	L	D	GF	GA	GD	Pts	SEA	VAN	POR
Seattle Sounders FC	4	3	1	0	7	4	+3	9	—	2–0	2–3
Vancouver Whitecaps FC	4	2	2	0	5	6	−1	6	1–2	—	2–1
Portland Timbers	4	1	3	0	5	7	−2	3	0–1	1–2	—

Source: "Cascadia Cup". cascadiacup.soccer. January 2018.

2019
Pos	Team	Pld	W	D	L	GF	GA	GD	Pts	SEA	VAN	POR
1	Seattle Sounders FC	4	2	1	1	4	3	+1	7	—	1–0	1–2
2	Vancouver Whitecaps FC	4	1	2	1	2	4	−2	5	0–0	—	1–0
3	Portland Timbers	4	1	1	2	6	5	+1	4	1–2	2–2	—

2020
Pos	Team	Pld	W	D	L	GF	GA	GD	Pts
1	Seattle Sounders FC	7	4	1	2	13	5	+8	13
2	Portland Timbers	6	4	1	1	6	5	+1	13
3	Vancouver Whitecaps FC	5	0	0	5	1	10	−9	0

No 2020 winner awarded due to COVID-19 pandemic

2021
Pos	Team	Pld	W	D	L	GF	GA	GD	Pts	SEA	POR	VAN
1	Seattle Sounders FC	4	2	1	1	11	6	+5	7	—	0–2	4–1
2	Portland Timbers	4	2	0	2	7	9	−2	6	2–6	—	2–3
3	Vancouver Whitecaps FC	4	1	1	2	5	8	−3	4	1–1	0–1	—

Source: "Cascadia Cup". cascadiacup.soccer. January 2021.

2022
Pos	Team	Pld	W	D	L	GF	GA	GD	Pts	POR	VAN	SEA
1	Portland Timbers	4	3	1	0	9	4	+5	10	—	1–1	2–1
2	Vancouver Whitecaps FC	4	1	1	2	5	9	−4	4	2–3	—	2–1
3	Seattle Sounders FC	4	1	0	3	6	7	−1	3	0–3	4–0	—

Source: "Schedule". mlssoccer.com.

2023
Pos	Team	Pld	W	D	L	GF	GA	GD	Pts
1	Vancouver Whitecaps FC	6	3	1	2	9	8	+1	10
2	Portland Timbers	6	2	2	2	11	8	+3	8
3	Seattle Sounders FC	6	1	3	2	6	10	−4	6

Source: "Schedule". mlssoccer.com.
Rules for classification: Scoring

2024
Pos	Team	Pld	W	D	L	GF	GA	GD	Pts
1	Portland Timbers	6	2	2	2	8	7	+1	8
2	Seattle Sounders FC	6	2	2	2	7	6	+1	8
3	Vancouver Whitecaps FC	6	2	2	2	7	9	−2	8

Source: "Schedule". mlssoccer.com.
Rules for classification: Scoring

2025
Pos	Team	Pld	W	D	L	GF	GA	GD	Pts	VAN	SEA	POR
1	Vancouver Whitecaps FC	4	2	2	0	10	4	+6	8	—	3–0	1–1
2	Seattle Sounders FC	4	1	2	1	4	6	−2	5	2–2	—	1–0
3	Portland Timbers	4	0	2	2	3	7	−4	2	1–4	1–1	—

Source: "Schedule". MLSsoccer.com.
Rules for classification: Scoring

2026
Pos	Team	Pld	W	D	L	GF	GA	GD	Pts	VAN	POR	SEA
1	Vancouver Whitecaps FC	4	4	0	0	14	4	+10	12	—	3–2	5–1
2	Portland Timbers	4	2	0	2	10	9	+1	6	1–4	—	2–1
3	Seattle Sounders FC	4	0	0	4	3	14	−11	0	0–2	1–5	—

Source: "Schedule". MLSsoccer.com.
Rules for classification: Scoring

== Current season (2026) ==
2026
Pos	Team	Pld	W	D	L	GF	GA	GD	Pts	VAN	POR	SEA
1	Vancouver Whitecaps FC (C)	4	4	0	0	14	4	+10	12	—	3–2	5–1
2	Portland Timbers	4	2	0	2	10	9	+1	6	1–4	—	2–1
3	Seattle Sounders FC	4	0	0	4	3	14	−11	0	0–2	1–5	—

Source: "Schedule". MLSsoccer.com.
Rules for classification: Scoring
(C) Champions

Sounders win Timbers win Whitecaps win Draw Upcoming fixture

March 7	Timbers	1–4	Whitecaps	Portland, Oregon
7:30 PM	Izoita 72'	Report	White 21', 87'; Blackmon 49'; Berhalter 64'	Stadium: Providence Park; Attendance: 22,473; Referee: Victor Rivas

April 4	Whitecaps	3–2	Timbers	Vancouver, British Columbia
7:30 PM	Ocampo 6'; Müller 90+1' (pen.); Berhalter 90+5'	Report	Mosquera 36'; Da Costa 45+2'	Stadium: BC Place; Attendance: 25,465; Referee: Joe Dickerson

July 16	Sounders	1–5	Timbers	Seattle, Washington
7:30 PM	Dotson 87'	Report	Kelsy 19', 63'; K. Miller 56'; Bassett 60'; Aravena 90+8'	Stadium: Lumen Field; Attendance: 35,383; Referee: Rosendo Mendoza

August 1	Timbers	2–1	Sounders	Portland, Oregon
7:30 PM	Kelsy 41'; Bye 82'	Report	Kossa-Rienzi 27'	Stadium: Providence Park; Attendance: 24,686; Referee: Joe Dickerson

August 16	Sounders	0–2	Whitecaps	Seattle, Washington
6:00 PM		Report	Elloumi 77'; Müller 82'	Stadium: Lumen Field; Attendance: 30,026; Referee: Armando Villarreal

November 1	Whitecaps	5–1	Sounders	Vancouver, British Columbia
1:30 PM	White 1', 53'; Gauld 9'; Laborda 43'; Cvetković 69'	Report	Morris 62'	Stadium: BC Place; Attendance: 32,111; Referee: Alexis Da Silva

== See also ==
- Portland Timbers–Seattle Sounders rivalry
- Portland Timbers–Vancouver Whitecaps rivalry
- Seattle Sounders–Vancouver Whitecaps rivalry
- MLS rivalry cups
- Cascadia official soccer team
