= 2026 Vancouver Whitecaps FC season =

Vancouver Whitecaps FC 2026 soccer season

Vancouver Whitecaps FC
- Chairman: Jeff Mallett
- Head coach: Jesper Sørensen
- Stadium: BC Place (Vancouver, BC)
- MLS regular season: Conference: 1st; Overall: 2nd
- MLS Cup playoffs: Round one
- Canadian Championship: Semi-finals
- CONCACAF Champions Cup: Round of 16
- Leagues Cup: League phase
- Top goalscorer: League: Brian White (20); All: Brian White (21)
- Highest home attendance: League/All: 40,086
- Lowest home attendance: League/All: 21,256 (5,086)
Home colours	Away colours	Third colours

The 2026 Vancouver Whitecaps FC season is the club's sixteenth season in Major League Soccer, the top division of soccer in the United States and Canada. Including previous iterations of the franchise, this is the 49th season of professional soccer being played in Vancouver under a variation of the "Whitecaps" name.

Having won the 2025 Canadian Championship and by being one of the highest ranked teams in the 2025 Supporters' Shield standings, the Whitecaps participated in the CONCACAF Champions Cup for a fourth consecutive season and sixth time overall. The club was seeking to build off their runner-up position from the previous season.

After a one year hiatus, it was announced that the Whitecaps would participate in the 2026 Leagues Cup after qualifying for the 2025 MLS Cup playoffs.

== Current roster ==
As of September 26, 2026

No.	Player	Nationality	Position	Date of birth (age)	Previous club
Goalkeepers
1	Yohei Takaoka	(Japan)	GK	March 16, 1996 (age 30)	(Japan) Yokohama F. Marinos
30	Adrian Zendejas	(United States)	GK	August 30, 1995 (age 31)	(Sweden) Skövde AIK
32	Isaac Boehmer	(Canada)	GK	November 20, 2001 (age 25)	(Canada) Vancouver Whitecaps Development Squad
Defenders
2	Mathías Laborda	(Uruguay)	DF	September 15, 1999 (age 27)	(Uruguay) Nacional
3	Sam Adekugbe	(Canada)	DF	January 16, 1995 (age 31)	(Turkey) Hatayspor
4	Ranko Veselinović	(Serbia)	DF	March 24, 1999 (age 27)	(Serbia) Vojvodina
6	Ralph Priso	(Canada)	DF	August 2, 2002 (age 24)	(United States) Colorado Rapids
12	Belal Halbouni	(Syria)	DF	December 29, 1999 (age 26)	(Germany) 1. FC Magdeburg
15	Sebastián Ramírez	(Colombia)	DF	February 9, 2006 (age 20)	(Colombia) Fortaleza CEIF
18	Édier Ocampo	(Colombia)	DF	October 3, 2003 (age 23)	(Colombia) Atlético Nacional
28	Tate Johnson	(United States)	DF	July 10, 2005 (age 21)	(United States) North Carolina Tar Heels
29	Mihail Gherasimencov	(Moldova)	DF	March 25, 2005 (age 21)	(Canada) Whitecaps FC 2
33	Tristan Blackmon	(United States)	DF	August 12, 1996 (age 30)	(United States) Charlotte FC
41	Nikola Djordjevic	(United States)	DF	November 14, 2002 (age 24)	(Canada) Whitecaps FC 2
70	Rui Modesto	(Angola)	DF	October 7, 1999 (age 27)	(Italy) Udinese
Midfielders
8	Oliver Larraz	(United States)	MF	September 16, 2001 (age 25)	(United States) Colorado Rapids
13	Thomas Müller	(Germany)	MF	September 13, 1989 (age 37)	(Germany) Bayern Munich
17	Kenji Cabrera	(Peru)	MF	January 23, 2003 (age 23)	(Peru) FBC Melgar
20	Andrés Cubas	(Paraguay)	MF	May 22, 1996 (age 30)	(France) Nîmes
23	Aleksa Cvetković	(Serbia)	MF	May 13, 2005 (age 21)	(Serbia) OFK Beograd
25	Ryan Gauld	(Scotland)	MF	December 16, 1995 (age 30)	(Portugal) Farense
59	Jeevan Badwal	(Canada)	MF	March 11, 2006 (age 20)	(Canada) Whitecaps FC 2
Forwards
7	Cheikh Sabaly	(Senegal)	FW	March 4, 1999 (age 27)	(France) Metz
11	Emmanuel Sabbi	(United States)	FW	December 24, 1997 (age 28)	(France) Le Havre
14	Bruno Caicedo	(Ecuador)	FW	January 15, 2005 (age 21)	(Ecuador) Barcelona SC
19	Rayan Elloumi	(Tunisia)	FW	September 17, 2007 (age 19)	(Canada) Whitecaps FC 2
22	Kwasi Poku	(Canada)	FW	February 6, 2003 (age 23)	(Belgium) RWDM Brussels
24	Brian White	(United States)	FW	February 3, 1996 (age 30)	(United States) New York Red Bulls
63	Johnny Selemani	(Canada)	FW	March 16, 2008 (age 18)	(Canada) Whitecaps FC 2
77	Yadaly Diaby	(Guinea)	FW	August 9, 2000 (age 26)	(France) Grenoble
Out on loan
	Emrick Fotsing	(Canada)	MF	September 27, 2007 (age 19)	(Canada) Vancouver FC
27	Giuseppe Bovalina	(Australia)	DF	November 11, 2004 (age 22)	(Australia) Adelaide United
42	Nelson Pierre	(Haiti)	FW	March 22, 2005 (age 21)	(United States) Philadelphia Union
97	Liam Mackenzie	(Canada)	MF	March 15, 2007 (age 19)	(Canada) Whitecaps FC 2

== Transfers ==
=== In ===
==== Transferred in ====
#	Position	Player	Transferred from	Fee/notes	Date	Source
41	DF	(United States) Nikola Djordjevic	(Canada) Whitecaps FC 2	Free	December 15, 2025	
29	DF	(Moldova) Mihail Gherasimencov	(Canada) Whitecaps FC 2	Homegrown player	December 17, 2025	
8	MF	(United States) Oliver Larraz	(United States) Colorado Rapids	Free	January 15, 2026	
14	FW	(Ecuador) Bruno Caicedo	(Ecuador) Barcelona SC	Undisclosed/U22 Initiative	January 30, 2026	
7	FW	(Senegal) Cheikh Sabaly	(France) FC Metz	Undisclosed	February 5, 2026	
22	FW	(Canada) Kwasi Poku	(Belgium) RWDM Brussels	Undisclosed	July 30, 2026	
23	MF	(Serbia) Aleksa Cvetković	(Serbia) OFK Beograd	Undisclosed	August 12, 2026	
	MF	(Canada) Emrick Fotsing	(Canada) Vancouver FC	Undisclosed	August 26, 2026	
70	DF	(Angola) Rui Modesto	(Italy) Udinese	Undisclosed	September 1, 2026	
77	FW	(Guinea) Yadaly Diaby	(France) Grenoble Foot 38	Undisclosed	September 1, 2026	
63	FW	(Canada) Johnny Selemani	(Canada) Whitecaps FC 2	Homegrown player	September 26, 2026	

==== Loans in ====
#	Position	Player	Loaned from	Date	Loan expires	Notes	Source
22	FW	(United States) Aziel Jackson	(Poland) Jagiellonia Białystok	January 30, 2026	June 30, 2026	Buy option	
15	DF	(Colombia) Sebastián Ramírez	(Colombia) Fortaleza CEIF	August 20, 2026	June 30, 2027	Buy option	

=== Out ===
==== Transferred out ====
#	Position	Player	Transferred to	Fee/notes	Date	Source
50	GK	(Canada) Max Anchor	(United States) Seattle Sounders	Option declined	December 8, 2025	
52	FW	(Canada) Nicolas Fleuriau Chateau	(Republic of Ireland) Galway United	Option declined	December 8, 2025	
53	DF	(United States) Mark O'Neill	(United States) Tacoma Defiance	Option declined	December 8, 2025	
7	FW	(Canada) Jayden Nelson	(United States) Austin FC	$700,000 in 2026 GAM $550,000 in 2027 GAM; 17th overall pick in 2026 MLS SuperDraft	December 18, 2025	
22	MF	(Canada) Ali Ahmed	(England) Norwich City	Undisclosed	January 4, 2026	
23	DF	(Belgium) Joedrick Pupe	(Belgium) Sint-Truiden	Undisclosed	June 23, 2026	
15	DF	(Germany) Sebastian Schonlau	(Germany) Holstein Kiel	Contract buyout	July 3, 2026	
16	MF	(United States) Sebastian Berhalter	(England) Middlesbrough	Undisclosed	July 28, 2026	
26	MF	(Cameroon) J.C. Ngando		Mutual contract termination	September 3, 2026	

==== Loans out ====
#	Position	Player	Loaned to	Date	Loan expires	Source
23	DF	(Belgium) Joedrick Pupe	(Belgium) Sint-Truiden	January 29, 2026	June 30, 2026	
27	DF	(Australia) Giuseppe Bovalina	(Sweden) Örebro SK	February 3, 2026	December 31, 2026	
42	FW	(Haiti) Nelson Pierre	(United States) FC Tulsa	February 24, 2026	August 27, 2026	
	MF	(Canada) Emrick Fotsing	(Canada) Vancouver FC	September 15, 2026	December 31, 2026	
42	FW	(Haiti) Nelson Pierre	(Canada) HFX Wanderers	August 27, 2026	December 31, 2026	
97	MF	(Canada) Liam Mackenzie	(Canada) HFX Wanderers	September 2, 2026	December 31, 2026	

=== MLS SuperDraft picks ===
Round	No.	Pos.	Player	College/Club team	Transaction	Source
1	17	MF	(United States) Zach Ramsey	(United States) Washington		
1	29	FW	(United States) Daniel Lugo	(United States) High Point		
2	59	FW	(Colombia) Yeider Zuluaga	(United States) Seattle	Signed with Whitecaps FC 2	
3	89	MF	(United States) Connor Lofy	(United States) Washington		

== Preseason and friendlies ==
Vancouver's preseason fixtures were announced on January 26.

January 27	Polissya Zhytomyr (Ukraine)	2–0	(Canada) Whitecaps FC	Marbella, Spain
03:00 (PST)	4'; 63' (pen.)	Report		Stadium: Marbella Football Center

January 31	Whitecaps FC (Canada)	1–0	(South Korea) Incheon United	La Nucía, Spain
05:00 (PST)	White 12'	Report		Stadium: Estadi Olímpic Camilo Cano

February 4	Jeonbuk Hyundai Motors (South Korea)	Cancelled	(Canada) Whitecaps FC	Marbella, Spain
06:00 (PST)				Stadium: Marbella Football Center
Note: Cancelled due to inclement weather.

February 8	Sparta Prague B (Czech Republic)	2–0	(Canada) Whitecaps FC	Marbella, Spain
03:00 (PST)	19'; 84'	Report		Stadium: Marbella Football Center

February 8	IF Brommapojkarna (Sweden)	2–1	(Canada) Whitecaps FC	Marbella, Spain
06:00 (PST)	3'; 15'	Report	40' (o.g.)	Stadium: Marbella Football Center

== Competition overview ==
Competition	First match	Last match	Starting round	Final position	Record							
Competition	First match	Last match	Starting round	Final position	Pld	W	D	L	GF	GA	GD	Win %
Major League Soccer	February 21	November 7	Matchday 1	1st in West, 2nd overall	34	19	7	8	74	34	+40	55.88
MLS Cup playoffs	November 22	TBD	Round one	TBD	0	0	0	0	0	0	+0	—
Canadian Championship	July 8	September 16	Quarter-finals	Semi-finals	4	1	2	1	7	5	+2	25.00
CONCACAF Champions Cup	February 18	March 18	Round one	Round of 16	4	1	1	2	3	5	−2	25.00
Leagues Cup	August 4	August 11	League phase	League phase	3	0	1	2	2	5	−3	0.00
Total					45	21	11	13	86	49	+37	46.67

Last updated: November 7, 2026
Source: Competitions

== Major League Soccer ==
=== Regular season ===
==== League tables ====
Western Conference standings
Pos	Team	Pld	W	L	T	GF	GA	GD	Pts	Qualification
1	Vancouver Whitecaps FC	34	19	8	7	74	34	+40	64	Qualification for round one and the CONCACAF Champions Cup round one
2	FC Dallas	34	16	8	10	62	51	+11	58	Qualification for round one
3	St. Louis City SC	34	15	10	9	59	48	+11	54	Qualification for round one
4	San Jose Earthquakes	34	14	10	10	57	51	+6	52	Qualification for round one
5	Houston Dynamo FC	34	14	11	9	43	43	0	51	Qualification for round one

Source: MLS
Rules for classification: 1) points; 2) total wins; 3) total goal differential; 4) total goals scored; 5) fewer disciplinary points; 6) away goal differential; 7) away goals scored; 8) home goals differential; 9) home goals scored; 10) coin toss (2 clubs tied) or drawing of lots (≥3 clubs tied)

Overall standings
Pos	Team	Pld	W	L	T	GF	GA	GD	Pts	Qualification
1	Nashville SC (S)	34	23	3	8	71	25	+46	77	Qualification for the CONCACAF Champions Cup round one (Note: As 2026 MLS Supporters' Shield champions)
2	Vancouver Whitecaps FC	34	19	8	7	74	34	+40	64	Qualification for the CONCACAF Champions Cup round one (Note: As Western Conference regular season winners)
3	Inter Miami CF	34	16	6	12	80	59	+21	60	Qualification for the CONCACAF Champions Cup round one (Note: As one of the next two highest-ranked clubs in 2026 MLS Supporters' Shield not already qualified)
4	New England Revolution	34	18	12	4	55	47	+8	58	Qualification for the CONCACAF Champions Cup round one
5	FC Dallas	34	16	8	10	62	51	+11	58	

Source: MLS
Rules for classification: 1) points; 2) total wins; 3) total goal differential; 4) total goals scored; 5) fewer disciplinary points; 6) away goal differential; 7) away goals scored; 8) home goals differential; 9) home goals scored; 10) coin toss (2 clubs tied) or drawing of lots (≥3 clubs tied)
(S) Supporters' Shield winners

==== Results ====
Overall								Home						Away					
Pld	Pts	W	L	T	GF	GA	GD	W	L	T	GF	GA	GD	W	L	T	GF	GA	GD
34	64	19	8	7	74	34	+40	11	4	2	44	16	+28	8	4	5	30	18	+12

Last updated: November 7, 2026
Pld = Matches played; Pts = Points; W = Matches won; T = Matches tied; L = Matches lost; GF = Goals for; GA = Goals against; GD = Goal difference

Round	1	2	3	4	5	6	7	8	9	10	11	12	13	14	15	16	17	18	19	20	21	22	23	24	25	26	27	28	29	30	31	32	33	34
Ground	H	H	A	H	H	H	H	H	H	A	A	A	A	A	A	A	H	A	H	H	A	H	H	H	A	H	A	A	A	A	A	H	H	A
Result	W	W	W	W	L	W	W	W	W	D	D	W	L	W	L	D	D	W	L	W	W	L	W	L	W	D	L	D	D	W	L	W	W	W
Position (West)	8	4	2	1	2	2	1	1	2	2	2	1	1	1	1	1	1	1	2	1	1	1	1	1	1	1	1	1	1	1	1	1	1	1

Updated to match(es) played on November 7, 2026. Source:
A = Away; H = Home; N = Neutral; W = Win; D = Draw; L = Loss; = Conference leader; = Playoffs berth; = Wild card berth

==== Matches ====
February 21 1	Whitecaps FC	1–0	Real Salt Lake	Vancouver, British Columbia
4:30 PM	Sabbi (yellow card) 50'; Jackson 57'; Cubas (yellow card) 82'	Report	Gozo (yellow card) 33'; Junqua (yellow card) 75'; Katranis (yellow card) 76'	Stadium: BC Place; Attendance: 23,546; Referee: Drew Fischer

February 28 2	Whitecaps FC	3–0	Toronto FC	Vancouver, British Columbia
6:30 PM	Müller 25' (pen.), 37'; White 45+2'; Ocampo (yellow card) 66'	Report		Stadium: BC Place; Attendance: 24,533; Referee: Fotis Bazakos

March 7 3 – Cascadia Cup	Portland Timbers	1–4	Whitecaps FC	Portland, Oregon
7:30 PM	Kelsy (yellow card) 7'; Velde (yellow card) 59'; Smith (yellow card) 67'; Izoita 72'	Report	Ocampo (yellow card) 17'; White 21', 87'; Blackmon 49'; Berhalter 63'; Sabbi (yellow card) 77'; Larraz (yellow card) 83'	Stadium: Providence Park; Attendance: 22,473; Referee: Victor Rivas

March 15 4	Whitecaps FC	6–0	Minnesota United FC	Vancouver, British Columbia
1:30 PM	Berhalter 8' (pen.); White 21', 54' (pen.); Laborda 22'; Sabbi 43'; Cubas (yellow card) 64'; Sabaly 74'	Report	Díaz (yellow card) 45+4'; Taylor (yellow card) 73'	Stadium: BC Place; Attendance: 23,885; Referee: Ricardo Fierro
Note: Rescheduled from March 14, due to the Whitecaps participation in the CONCACAF Champions Cup Round of 16.

March 21 5	Whitecaps FC	0–1	San Jose Earthquakes	Vancouver, British Columbia
7:30 PM	Ngando (yellow card) 60'	Report	Werner (yellow card) 31'; Leroux 45+2'; Jones (yellow card) 50'; Judd (yellow card) 90+6'	Stadium: BC Place; Attendance: 21,261; Referee: Chris Penso

April 4 6 – Cascadia Cup	Whitecaps FC	3–2	Portland Timbers	Vancouver, British Columbia
7:30 PM	Ocampo 6'; Laborda (yellow card) 68'; Müller 90+1' (pen.); Berhalter 90+5'	Report	Mosquera 36'; Da Costa 45+2'; Chará (yellow card) 80'	Stadium: BC Place; Attendance: 25,465; Referee: Joe Dickerson

April 11 7	Whitecaps FC	2–0	New York City FC	Vancouver, British Columbia
4:30 PM	Laborda 45'; Cubas (yellow card) 53'; Larraz (yellow card) 80'; White 87'	Report		Stadium: BC Place; Attendance: 25,460; Referee: Jair Marrufo

April 17 8	Whitecaps FC	3–0	Sporting Kansas City	Vancouver, British Columbia
7:30 PM	Sabbi 13'; Caicedo 23'; Müller 28'; Berhalter (yellow card) 68'	Report	Harris (yellow card) 32'; Borges (yellow card) 66'	Stadium: BC Place; Attendance: 21,777; Referee: Elijio Arreguin

April 25 9	Whitecaps FC	3–1	Colorado Rapids	Vancouver, British Columbia
7:30 PM	Sabaly 7'; White 23', 85'; Caicedo (yellow card) 90+2'	Report	R. Navarro 33'; M. Navarro (yellow card) 82'	Stadium: BC Place; Attendance: 27,589; Referee: Lorenzo Hernandez

May 2 10	LA Galaxy	1–1	Whitecaps FC	Carson, California
7:30 PM	Cuevas (yellow card) 26'; Paintsil 46'; Sanabria (yellow card) 65'; Cerrillo (yellow card) 67'; Glesnes (yellow card) 90+1'; Pec (yellow card) 90+3'	Report	Cubas (yellow card) 33'; Ocampo (yellow card) 66'; Laborda 81'; Berhalter (yellow card) 84'; Blackmon (yellow card) 87'; Larraz (yellow card) 90+5'	Stadium: Dignity Health Sports Park; Attendance: 19,429; Referee: Alexis Da Silva

May 9 11	San Jose Earthquakes	1–1	Whitecaps FC	San Jose, California
7:30 PM	Judd 4'; Vieira (yellow card) 25'; Kikanović (yellow card) 36'; Daniel (yellow card) 36'	Report	Berhalter (yellow card) 55' (goal) 76'	Stadium: PayPal Park; Attendance: 18,000; Referee: Malik Badawi

May 13 12	FC Dallas	2–3	Whitecaps FC	Frisco, Texas
5:30 PM	Musa 10' (pen.); Binyamin (yellow card) 12'; Moore (yellow card) 14'; Farrington 49', (yellow card) 60'	Report	Blackmon (yellow card) 7'; Berhalter 23', 64'; Urhoghide 40' (o.g.); Sabaly (yellow card) 45+9'; Ocampo (yellow card) 79'; Cabrera (yellow card) 90+4'	Stadium: Toyota Stadium; Attendance: 11,004; Referee: Rosendo Mendoza

May 16 13	Houston Dynamo FC	1–0	Whitecaps FC	Houston, Texas
5:30 PM	Resch (yellow card) 54'; Guilherme 90+6'	Report	Cabrera (yellow card) 11'; Johnson (yellow card) 45+11'; Ocampo (yellow card) 48'; Cubas (yellow card) 62'; Takaoka (red card) 64'	Stadium: Shell Energy Stadium; Attendance: 20,114; Referee: Ismail Elfath

May 23 14	San Diego FC	2–4	Whitecaps FC	San Diego, California
7:30 PM	Vazquez 53'; Zamblé 90+1'; Bombino (yellow card) 55' (yellow-red card) 72'; Verhoeven (yellow card) 88'	Report	White 30', 45', (yellow card) 51'; Caicedo 67', (yellow card) 90+2'; Priso 75'; Badwal (yellow card) 63'	Stadium: Snapdragon Stadium; Attendance: 23,906; Referee: Drew Fischer

July 22 16	FC Cincinnati	4–3	Whitecaps FC	Cincinnati, Ohio
4:30 PM	Bucha 9', 56' (yellow card) 41'; Denkey 28'; Evander 36'	Report	Blackmon (yellow card) 2'; Badwal 12'; Laborda (yellow card) 17'; Gauld 25', 60'; Ocampo (yellow card) 48'; White (yellow card) 78'	Stadium: TQL Stadium; Attendance: 25,513; Referee: Jon Freemon

July 25 17	Minnesota United FC	0–0	Whitecaps FC	Saint Paul, Minnesota
5:30 PM	Dieng (yellow card) 17'; Boxall (yellow card) 88'	Report	Badwal (yellow card) 24'	Stadium: Allianz Field; Attendance: 18,845; Referee: Lorenzo Hernandez

August 1 18	Whitecaps FC	1–1	Los Angeles FC	Vancouver, British Columbia
4:30 PM	Gauld (yellow card) 56'; Müller 76' (pen.)	Report	Son Heung-min 37'; Hollingshead (yellow card) 48'	Stadium: BC Place; Attendance: 40,086; Referee: Elijio Arreguin

August 16 19 – Cascadia Cup	Seattle Sounders FC	0–2	Whitecaps FC	Seattle, Washington
6:00 PM	Ragen (yellow card) 57'; Nouhou (yellow card) 76'; Rothrock (yellow card) 86'	Report	Elloumi 77'; Müller 82'	Stadium: Lumen Field; Attendance: 30,026; Referee: Armando Villarreal

August 19 20	Whitecaps FC	0–1	Houston Dynamo FC	Vancouver, British Columbia
7:30 PM	Cubas (yellow card) 26'	Report	Negri 34'; Resch (yellow card) 38'; Bouzat (yellow card) 41'	Stadium: BC Place; Attendance: 22,849; Referee: Ricardo Montero

August 22 21	Whitecaps FC	5–0	FC Dallas	Vancouver, British Columbia
6:30 PM	Sabbi 11'; White 23', 37'; Ocampo 45+6'; Caicedo 68'; Laborda 90+3'	Report	Moore (yellow card) 7'; Binyamin (yellow card) 31'; Torquato (yellow card) 42'; Abubakar (yellow card) 59'	Stadium: BC Place; Attendance: 25,398; Referee: Malik Badawi

August 29 22	Sporting Kansas City	0–3	Whitecaps FC	Kansas City, Kansas
5:30 PM	Afrifa (yellow card) 73'; Mosquera (yellow card) 90+5'	Report	Müller 40' (pen.); Caicedo (yellow card) 45+4'; Brian White 48'; Johnson (yellow card) 51'; Elloumi 90'	Stadium: Sporting Park; Attendance: 14,879; Referee: Marcos de Oliveira

September 5 23	Whitecaps FC	1–3	St. Louis City SC	Vancouver, British Columbia
7:30 PM	Sabbi 2', (yellow card) 50'; Müller (yellow card) 26'; Laborda (yellow card) 49'; Gauld (yellow card) 71'	Report	Becher 23'; Wallem (yellow card) 36', (goal) 45'; Totland 41'; Durkin (yellow card) 84'; Fal (yellow card) 90+3'	Stadium: BC Place; Attendance: 22,320; Referee: Michael Venne

September 9 24	Whitecaps FC	3–0	LA Galaxy	Vancouver, British Columbia
7:30 PM	White 8'; Gauld 57'; Caicedo 90' (pen.); Diaby (yellow card) 90+2'	Report	Haak (yellow card) 74'; Roberto (yellow card) 74'; Garcés (yellow card) 89'	Stadium: BC Place; Attendance: 20,947; Referee: Pierre-Luc Lauziére

September 13 25	Whitecaps FC	1–2	Austin FC	Vancouver, British Columbia
3:30 PM	Gauld (penalty missed) 40'; Larraz (yellow card) 45+3'; White 49'; Sabbi (yellow card) 80'	Report	Ramirez 28', 60'; Bell (yellow card) 35'; Rosales (yellow card) 37'; Biro (yellow card) 47' (red card) 90'; Šabović (yellow card) 90+3'	Stadium: BC Place; Attendance: 23,855; Referee: Victor Rivas

September 19 26	Real Salt Lake	0–3	Whitecaps FC	Sandy, Utah
6:30 PM	Caliskan (yellow card) 59'; Guilavogui (yellow card) 72'	Report	White 9'; Müller 29'; Johnson (yellow card) 49'; Badwal (yellow card) 52'; Diaby 63' (yellow card) 81'; Blackmon (yellow card) 66'; Ocampo (yellow card) 90+1'	Stadium: America First Field; Attendance: 20,574; Referee: Guido Gonzales Jr.

September 26 27	Whitecaps FC	3–3	D.C. United	Vancouver, British Columbia
7:30 PM	White 25'; Caicedo 45+3'; Müller 72'	Report	Nono 16', 80'; Rowles (yellow card) 23'; Bartlett 65'	Stadium: BC Place; Attendance: 26,080; Referee: Fotis Bazakos

October 6 15	Chicago Fire FC	3–1	Whitecaps FC	Chicago, Illinois
5:30 PM	Bamba 9'; Zinckernagel (yellow card) 19', (goal) 50'; Dean (yellow card) 55'; Haile-Selassie 88'	Report	Johnson (yellow card) 61'; Laborda 73'	Stadium: Soldier Field; Attendance: 31,381; Referee: Sergii Boiko
Note: Rescheduled from July 16, due to poor air quality in Chicago from the 2026 Canadian wildfires.

October 10 28	Los Angeles FC	1–1	Whitecaps FC	Los Angeles, California
7:30 PM	Choinière (yellow card) 25'; Bouanga 46'; Jesus (yellow card) 72'; Hollingshead (yellow card) 89'	Report	Blackmon (red card) 7'; Larraz 43'; Ocampo (yellow card) 76'; Laborda (yellow card) 90+2'	Stadium: BMO Stadium; Attendance: 22,287; Referee: Guido Gonzales Jr.

October 14 29	St. Louis City SC	0–0	Whitecaps FC	St. Louis, Missouri
5:30 PM	Fall (yellow card) 45+1'; Mățan (yellow card) 85'	Report	Ocampo (yellow card) 45+2'; Priso (yellow card) 81'	Stadium: Energizer Park; Attendance: 22,423; Referee: Filip Dujic

October 17 30	Austin FC	1–2	Whitecaps FC	Austin, Texas
5:30 PM	Uzuni 40'	Report	Cubas (yellow card) 13'; Blackmon (yellow card) 36'; Gauld 47', (yellow card) 90'; Diaby 71'	Stadium: Q2 Stadium; Attendance: 20,738; Referee: Tori Penso

October 24 31	Colorado Rapids	1–0	Whitecaps FC	Commerce City, Colorado
6:30 PM	Frederick (yellow card) 21'; Whittaker 81'; Travis (yellow card) 90+4'	Report		Stadium: Dick's Sporting Goods Park; Attendance: 15,605; Referee: Jair Marrufo

October 28 32	Whitecaps FC	4–1	San Diego FC	Vancouver, British Columbia
7:30 PM	Cvetković 24'; White 41'; Gauld 66'; Caicedo 76'; Johnson (yellow card) 82'; Elloumi (yellow card) 90+1' (yellow-red card) 90+4'	Report	Duah (yellow card) 2'; Tverskov (yellow card) 55'; Valakari 83'	Stadium: BC Place; Attendance: 21,718; Referee: Joe Dickerson

November 1 33 – Cascadia Cup	Whitecaps FC	5–1	Seattle Sounders FC	Vancouver, British Columbia
1:30 PM	White 1', 53'; Gauld 9'; Laborda 43'; Caicedo (yellow card) 45+2'; Ćetković 79'	Report	Ferreira (yellow card) 45+3'; Morris 62'	Stadium: BC Place; Attendance: 32,111; Referee: Alexis Da Silva
Note: Match originally scheduled for October 31.

November 7 34	CF Montréal	0–2	Whitecaps FC	Montreal, Quebec
1:00 PM	Loturi (yellow card) 45'; Petrasso (yellow card) 74'	Report	Gherasimencov (yellow card) 26', (goal) 83'; Ocampo (yellow card) 42'; Sabaly 50'; Priso (yellow card) 63'	Stadium: Saputo Stadium; Attendance: 13,430; Referee: Marcos de Oliveira

=== MLS Cup playoffs ===
==== Round one ====
November 22 Game 1	Whitecaps FC	v	Real Salt Lake	Vancouver, British Columbia
6:30 PM				Stadium: BC Place

November 27 Game 2	Real Salt Lake	v	Whitecaps FC	Sandy, Utah
8:00 PM				Stadium: America First Field

December 2 Game 3	Whitecaps FC	v	Real Salt Lake	Vancouver, British Columbia
TBA				Stadium: BC Place

== Canadian Championship ==
The format was announced on January 15. As champions of the 2025 Canadian Championship, Vancouver received a bye to the quarter-finals.

=== Quarter-finals ===
July 8 First leg	Whitecaps FC	4–1	Calvary FC	Burnaby, British Columbia (Note: BC Place was unavailable for both legs due to the 2026 FIFA World Cup and Swangard Stadium was only available for the first leg.)
7:30 PM	Pearlman 2' (o.g.); Blackmon (yellow card) 45+2'; Müller 62'; White 64'; Elloumi 74'; Ngando (yellow card) 77'	Report	Klomp 45'; Kobza (yellow card) 54'; Ntignee (yellow card) 90+3'	Stadium: Swangard Stadium; Attendance: 5,086; Referee: Yusri Rudolf
Note: Order of legs was swapped due to stadium availability.

July 13 Second leg	Calvary FC	1–1 (2–5 agg.)	Whitecaps FC	Foothills County, Alberta
6:30 PM	Didić (yellow card) 38'; Kobza (yellow card) 52'; Musse 75'	Report	Laborda (yellow card) 1'; Gherasimencov 86'	Stadium: ATCO Field; Attendance: 6,012; Referee: Michael Venne

=== Semi-finals ===
September 2 First leg	Whitecaps FC	1–1	CF Montréal	Vancouver, British Columbia
7:00 PM	Badwal (yellow card) 66'; Gauld 72'; Blackmon (yellow card) 90+1'	Report	Pereira 16' (yellow card) 43'; Ríos (yellow card) 30'; Ceballos (yellow card) 73'; Synchuk (yellow card) 90+6'	Stadium: BC Place; Attendance: 18,437; Referee: Renzo Villanueva

September 16 Second leg	CF Montréal	2–1 (3–2 agg.)	Whitecaps FC	Montreal, Quebec
4:00 PM	Ceballos (yellow card) 21'; Owusu 30' (pen.), 45', (yellow card) 41'	Report	Badwal (yellow card) 9'; Blackmon (yellow card) 21'; Adekugbe (yellow card) 29'; Sabbi 90+1'	Stadium: Saputo Stadium; Attendance: 10,333; Referee: Filip Dujic

== CONCACAF Champions Cup ==
=== Round one ===
February 18 First leg	Cartaginés	0–0	Whitecaps FC	Cartago, Costa Rica
7:00 PM	Núñez (yellow card) 54'; López (yellow card) 60'	Report	Ocampo (yellow card) 62'; Cubas (yellow card) 63'; Larraz (yellow card) 89'	Stadium: Estadio José Rafael Fello Meza Ivankovich; Attendance: 3,733; Referee: Bryan López (Guatemala)

February 25 Second leg	Whitecaps FC	2–0 (2–0 agg.)	Cartaginés	Vancouver, British Columbia
6:00 PM	Sabbi (yellow card) 45+1'; Cabrera 58'; Ocampo (yellow card) 73'; Berhalter 80'; Cubas (yellow card) 85'	Report	Zúñiga (yellow card) 28'; Flores (yellow card) 37'; López (yellow card) 45+1'	Stadium: BC Place; Attendance: 15,517; Referee: Marco Ortíz (Mexico)

=== Round of 16 ===
March 12 First leg	Whitecaps FC	0–3	Seattle Sounders FC	Vancouver, British Columbia
7:00 PM		Report	Arriola 45', 58'; Rothrock 70'	Stadium: BC Place; Attendance: 12,446; Referee: César Ramos (Mexico)

March 18 Second leg	Seattle Sounders FC	2–1 (5–1 agg.)	Whitecaps FC	Spokane, Washington (Note: Seattle Sounders FC played their home match in the round of 16 at One Spokane Stadium due to 2026 FIFA World Cup preparations at their regular home stadium, Lumen Field in Seattle.)
8:00 PM	Brunell (yellow card) 45+2'; Musovski 79'; Rothrock 83'; Frei (yellow card) 89'	Report	Laborda (yellow card) 4'; Jackson (yellow card) 15'; Badwal 24'; Priso (yellow card) 77'; Berhalter (yellow card) 81'	Stadium: One Spokane Stadium; Attendance: 5,126; Referee: Oshane Nation (Jamaica)

== Leagues Cup ==
=== League phase ===
MLS team standings
Pos	Team	Pld	W	PW	PL	L	GF	GA	GD	Pts
14	Inter Miami CF	3	1	0	0	2	7	7	0	3
15	New York City FC	3	1	0	0	2	4	4	0	3
16	Seattle Sounders FC	3	1	0	0	2	4	5	−1	3
17	Philadelphia Union	3	1	0	0	2	3	4	−1	3
18	Vancouver Whitecaps FC	3	0	0	1	2	2	5	−3	1

Source: Leagues Cup

August 4	Whitecaps FC	0–1	Atlante	Vancouver, British Columbia
7:30 PM		Report	Julio 40'; González (yellow card) 89'	Stadium: BC Place; Attendance: 19,824; Referee: Ekaterina Koroleva
Note: Game was originally scheduled against Mazatlán F.C. until the team was disbanded and replaced by Atlante F.C.

August 7	Whitecaps FC	1–3	Juárez	Vancouver, British Columbia
7:30 PM	Badwal 12'; Johnson (yellow card) 41'	Report	Ayón 34'; Mayorga (yellow card) 70'; Estupiñán 74'; Castilho (yellow card) 81'; Ricardinho 90+6', (yellow card) 90+7'	Stadium: BC Place; Attendance: 13,328; Referee: Karen Hernández

August 11	UANL	1–1 (5–4 p)	Whitecaps FC	San Nicolás de los Garza, Nuevo León
7:00 PM	Joaquim (yellow card) 2'; Aguirre 19'; Brunetta (yellow card) 39'; Lainez (red card) 88'; Guzmán (red card) 90+2'	Report	Djordjevic (yellow card) 15'; Sabbi 80'; Badwal (yellow card) 90+4'	Stadium: Estadio Universitario; Attendance: 17,181; Referee: Iván Barton
	Penalties
	Brunetta (penalty scored); Gorriarán (penalty scored); Aguirre (penalty missed); Rômulo (penalty scored); Sánchez (penalty scored); Garza (penalty missed); Joaquim (penalty scored)		(penalty scored) Gauld; (penalty scored) Sabbi; (penalty scored) Larraz; (penalty scored) Ocampo; (penalty missed) Laborda; (penalty missed) Priso; (penalty missed) Elloumi

== Cascadia Cup ==
2026 Cascadia Cup standings
Pos	Team	Pld	W	D	L	GF	GA	GD	Pts
1	Vancouver Whitecaps FC	4	4	0	0	14	4	+10	12
2	Portland Timbers	4	2	0	2	10	9	+1	6
3	Seattle Sounders FC	4	0	0	4	3	14	−11	0

Source: "Schedule". MLSsoccer.com.
Rules for classification: Scoring

2026 Cascadia Cup standings
Pos	Team	Pld	W	D	L	GF	GA	GD	Pts
1	Vancouver Whitecaps FC (C)	4	4	0	0	14	4	+10	12
2	Portland Timbers	4	2	0	2	10	9	+1	6
3	Seattle Sounders FC	4	0	0	4	3	14	−11	0

Source: "Schedule". MLSsoccer.com.
Rules for classification: Scoring
(C) Champions

Overall								Home						Away					
Pld	Pts	W	L	T	GF	GA	GD	W	L	T	GF	GA	GD	W	L	T	GF	GA	GD
4	12	4	0	0	14	4	+10	2	0	0	8	3	+5	2	0	0	6	1	+5

Last updated: November 1, 2026
Source: Standings
Pld = Matches played; Pts = Points; W = Matches won; T = Matches tied; L = Matches lost; GF = Goals for; GA = Goals against; GD = Goal difference

== Statistics ==
=== Appearances and goals ===
As of November 7, 2026

No.	Pos	Nat	Player	Total		MLS		MLS Cup playoffs		Canadian Championship		Champions Cup		Leagues Cup	
No.	Pos	Nat	Player	Apps	Goals	Apps	Goals	Apps	Goals	Apps	Goals	Apps	Goals	Apps	Goals
Goalkeepers
1	GK	(Japan) JPN	Yohei Takaoka	37	0	33	0	0	0	0	0	4	0	0	0
30	GK	(United States) USA	Adrian Zendejas	0	0	0	0	0	0	0	0	0	0	0	0
32	GK	(Canada) CAN	Isaac Boehmer	9	0	1+1	0	0	0	4	0	0	0	3	0
Defenders
2	DF	(Uruguay) URU	Mathías Laborda	43	5	27+5	5	0	0	3+1	0	3+1	0	2+1	0
3	DF	(Canada) CAN	Sam Adekugbe	11	0	0+7	0	0	0	2	0	0	0	2	0
4	DF	(Serbia) SRB	Ranko Veselinović	10	0	2+6	0	0	0	2	0	0	0	0	0
12	DF	(Syria) SYR	Belal Halbouni	0	0	0	0	0	0	0	0	0	0	0	0
15	DF	(Colombia) COL	Sebastián Ramírez	1	0	0+1	0	0	0	0	0	0	0	0	0
18	DF	(Colombia) COL	Édier Ocampo	41	2	28+2	2	0	0	4	0	4	0	2+1	0
28	DF	(United States) USA	Tate Johnson	41	0	30+1	0	0	0	1+3	0	4	0	1+1	0
29	DF	(Moldova) MDA	Mihail Gherasimencov	15	2	4+7	1	0	0	1+2	1	0	0	0+1	0
33	DF	(United States) USA	Tristan Blackmon	42	1	30+2	1	0	0	3+1	0	3	0	2+1	0
41	DF	(United States) USA	Nikola Djordjevic	11	0	0+6	0	0	0	1+1	0	0	0	2+1	0
70	DF	(Angola) ANG	Rui Modesto	4	0	3+1	0	0	0	0	0	0	0	0	0
Midfielders
6	MF	(Canada) CAN	Ralph Priso	25	1	12+6	1	0	0	0+1	0	2+1	0	2+1	0
8	MF	(United States) USA	Oliver Larraz	38	1	20+9	1	0	0	3	0	2+2	0	2	0
13	MF	(Germany) GER	Thomas Müller	35	10	18+7	9	0	0	2+2	1	2+2	0	1+1	0
17	MF	(Peru) PER	Kenji Cabrera	13	1	2+7	0	0	0	0	0	3+1	1	0	0
20	MF	(Paraguay) PAR	Andrés Cubas	31	0	24+1	0	0	0	1+1	0	2+1	0	1	0
23	MF	(Serbia) SRB	Aleksa Cvetković	9	2	6+3	2	0	0	0	0	0	0	0	0
25	MF	(Scotland) SCO	Ryan Gauld	26	7	15+5	6	0	0	3+1	1	0	0	1+1	0
59	MF	(Canada) CAN	Jeevan Badwal	32	3	16+6	1	0	0	4	0	3+1	1	2	1
Forwards
7	FW	(Senegal) SEN	Cheikh Sabaly	29	3	13+11	3	0	0	1	0	0+1	0	2+1	0
11	FW	(United States) USA	Emmanuel Sabbi	35	6	19+7	4	0	0	1+1	1	3+1	0	1+2	1
14	FW	(Ecuador) ECU	Bruno Caicedo	29	6	9+16	6	0	0	1+3	0	0	0	0	0
19	FW	(Tunisia) TUN	Rayan Elloumi	37	3	4+22	2	0	0	2+2	1	1+3	0	2+1	0
22	FW	(Canada) CAN	Kwasi Poku	1	0	0+1	0	0	0	0	0	0	0	0	0
24	FW	(United States) USA	Brian White	41	21	30+1	20	0	0	2+2	1	3+1	0	1+1	0
63	FW	(Canada) CAN	Johnny Selemani	3	0	0+1	0	0	0	0	0	0	0	1+1	0
77	FW	(Guinea) GUI	Yadaly Diaby	13	2	7+5	2	0	0	1	0	0	0	0	0
Players transferred out during the season
15	DF	(Germany) GER	Sebastian Schonlau	1	0	0+1	0	0	0	0	0	0	0	0	0
16	MF	(United States) USA	Sebastian Berhalter	18	7	13+1	6	0	0	0	0	4	1	0	0
22	FW	(United States) USA	Aziel Jackson	14	1	7+3	1	0	0	0	0	1+3	0	0	0
26	MF	(Cameroon) CMR	J.C. Ngando	10	0	1+2	0	0	0	2	0	0+2	0	3	0
42	FW	(Haiti) HAI	Nelson Pierre	0	0	0	0	0	0	0	0	0	0	0	0
97	MF	(Canada) CAN	Liam Mackenzie	0	0	0	0	0	0	0	0	0	0	0	0

Source: Competitions

=== Goalscorers ===
As of November 7, 2026

Rank	No.	Pos.	Nat.	Player	MLS	MLS Cup playoffs	Canadian Championship	Champions Cup	Leagues Cup	Total
1	24	FW	(United States)	Brian White	20	0	1	0	0	21
2	13	MF	(Germany)	Thomas Müller	9	0	1	0	0	10
3	16	MF	(United States)	Sebastian Berhalter	6	0	0	1	0	7
3	25	FW	(Scotland)	Ryan Gauld	6	0	1	0	0	7
5	11	FW	(United States)	Emmanuel Sabbi	4	0	1	0	1	6
5	14	FW	(Ecuador)	Bruno Caicedo	6	0	0	0	0	6
7	2	DF	(Uruguay)	Mathías Laborda	5	0	0	0	0	5
8	7	FW	(Senegal)	Cheikh Sabaly	3	0	0	0	0	3
8	19	FW	(Tunisia)	Rayan Elloumi	2	0	1	0	0	3
8	59	MF	(Canada)	Jeevan Badwal	1	0	0	1	1	3
11	18	DF	(Colombia)	Édier Ocampo	2	0	0	0	0	2
11	23	MF	(Serbia)	Aleksa Cvetković	2	0	0	0	0	2
11	29	DF	(Moldova)	Mihail Gherasimencov	1	0	1	0	0	2
11	77	FW	(Guinea)	Yadaly Diaby	2	0	0	0	0	2
15	6	MF	(Canada)	Ralph Priso	1	0	0	0	0	1
15	8	MF	(United States)	Oliver Larraz	1	0	0	0	0	1
15	17	MF	(Peru)	Kenji Cabrera	0	0	0	1	0	1
15	22	FW	(United States)	Aziel Jackson	1	0	0	0	0	1
15	33	DF	(United States)	Tristan Blackmon	1	0	0	0	0	1
Own goals					1	0	1	0	0	2
Totals					74	0	7	3	2	86

=== Clean sheets ===
As of November 7, 2026

Rank	No.	Pos.	Nat.	Player	MLS	MLS Cup playoffs	Canadian Championship	Champions Cup	Leagues Cup	Total
1	1	GK	(Japan)	Yohei Takaoka	13	0	0	2	0	15
Totals					13	0	0	2	0	15

=== Disciplinary record ===
As of November 7, 2026

No.	Pos.	Nat.	Player	MLS			MLS Cup playoffs			Canadian Championship			Champions Cup			Leagues Cup			Total		
No.	Pos.	Nat.	Player	Yellow card	(yellow card) (yellow-red card)	Red card	Yellow card	(yellow card) (yellow-red card)	Red card	Yellow card	(yellow card) (yellow-red card)	Red card	Yellow card	(yellow card) (yellow-red card)	Red card	Yellow card	(yellow card) (yellow-red card)	Red card	Yellow card	(yellow card) (yellow-red card)	Red card
1	GK	(Japan)	Yohei Takaoka	0	0	1	0	0	0	0	0	0	0	0	0	0	0	0	0	0	1
2	DF	(Uruguay)	Mathías Laborda	5	0	0	0	0	0	1	0	0	1	0	0	0	0	0	7	0	0
3	DF	(Canada)	Sam Adekugbe	0	0	0	0	0	0	1	0	0	0	0	0	0	0	0	1	0	0
4	DF	(Serbia)	Ranko Veselinović	0	0	0	0	0	0	0	0	0	0	0	0	0	0	0	0	0	0
6	MF	(Canada)	Ralph Priso	2	0	0	0	0	0	0	0	0	1	0	0	0	0	0	3	0	0
7	FW	(Senegal)	Cheikh Sabaly	1	0	0	0	0	0	0	0	0	0	0	0	0	0	0	1	0	0
8	MF	(United States)	Oliver Larraz	4	0	0	0	0	0	0	0	0	1	0	0	0	0	0	5	0	0
11	FW	(United States)	Emmanuel Sabbi	4	0	0	0	0	0	0	0	0	1	0	0	0	0	0	5	0	0
12	DF	(Syria)	Belal Halbouni	0	0	0	0	0	0	0	0	0	0	0	0	0	0	0	0	0	0
13	MF	(Germany)	Thomas Müller	1	0	0	0	0	0	0	0	0	0	0	0	0	0	0	1	0	0
14	FW	(Ecuador)	Bruno Caicedo	4	0	0	0	0	0	0	0	0	0	0	0	0	0	0	4	0	0
15	DF	(Colombia)	Sebastián Ramírez	0	0	0	0	0	0	0	0	0	0	0	0	0	0	0	0	0	0
15	DF	(Germany)	Sebastian Schonlau	0	0	0	0	0	0	0	0	0	0	0	0	0	0	0	0	0	0
16	MF	(United States)	Sebastian Berhalter	3	0	0	0	0	0	0	0	0	1	0	0	0	0	0	4	0	0
17	MF	(Peru)	Kenji Cabrera	2	0	0	0	0	0	0	0	0	0	0	0	0	0	0	2	0	0
18	DF	(Colombia)	Édier Ocampo	10	0	0	0	0	0	0	0	0	2	0	0	0	0	0	12	0	0
19	FW	(Tunisia)	Rayan Elloumi	0	1	0	0	0	0	0	0	0	0	0	0	0	0	0	0	1	0
20	MF	(Paraguay)	Andrés Cubas	7	0	0	0	0	0	0	0	0	2	0	0	0	0	0	9	0	0
22	FW	(United States)	Aziel Jackson	0	0	0	0	0	0	0	0	0	1	0	0	0	0	0	1	0	0
22	FW	(Canada)	Kwasi Poku	0	0	0	0	0	0	0	0	0	0	0	0	0	0	0	0	0	0
23	MF	(Serbia)	Aleksa Cvetković	0	0	0	0	0	0	0	0	0	0	0	0	0	0	0	0	0	0
24	FW	(United States)	Brian White	2	0	0	0	0	0	0	0	0	0	0	0	0	0	0	2	0	0
25	MF	(Scotland)	Ryan Gauld	3	0	0	0	0	0	0	0	0	0	0	0	0	0	0	3	0	0
26	MF	(Cameroon)	J.C. Ngando	1	0	0	0	0	0	1	0	0	0	0	0	0	0	0	2	0	0
28	DF	(United States)	Tate Johnson	5	0	0	0	0	0	0	0	0	0	0	0	1	0	0	6	0	0
29	DF	(Moldova)	Mihail Gherasimencov	1	0	0	0	0	0	0	0	0	0	0	0	0	0	0	1	0	0
30	GK	(United States)	Adrian Zendejas	0	0	0	0	0	0	0	0	0	0	0	0	0	0	0	0	0	0
32	GK	(Canada)	Isaac Boehmer	0	0	0	0	0	0	0	0	0	0	0	0	0	0	0	0	0	0
33	DF	(United States)	Tristan Blackmon	5	0	1	0	0	0	3	0	0	0	0	0	0	0	0	8	0	1
41	DF	(United States)	Nikola Djordjevic	0	0	0	0	0	0	0	0	0	0	0	0	1	0	0	1	0	0
42	FW	(Haiti)	Nelson Pierre	0	0	0	0	0	0	0	0	0	0	0	0	0	0	0	0	0	0
59	MF	(Canada)	Jeevan Badwal	3	0	0	0	0	0	2	0	0	0	0	0	1	0	0	6	0	0
63	FW	(Canada)	Johnny Selemani	0	0	0	0	0	0	0	0	0	0	0	0	0	0	0	0	0	0
70	DF	(Angola)	Rui Modesto	0	0	0	0	0	0	0	0	0	0	0	0	0	0	0	0	0	0
77	FW	(Guinea)	Yadaly Diaby	2	0	0	0	0	0	0	0	0	0	0	0	0	0	0	2	0	0
97	MF	(Canada)	Liam Mackenzie	0	0	0	0	0	0	0	0	0	0	0	0	0	0	0	0	0	0
Totals				65	1	2	0	0	0	8	0	0	10	0	0	3	0	0	86	1	2
