= 2026 Portland Timbers season =

Portland Timbers
2026 season
- CEO: Heather Davis
- Head coach: Phil Neville (until May 25); Jack Cassidy (interim, from June 5 until August 11); Martí Cifuentes (from August 11)
- Stadium: Providence Park; Portland, Oregon (Capacity: 25,218)
- Major League Soccer: Conference: 10th Overall: 20th
- Leagues Cup: League phase
- Top goalscorer: League: Kevin Kelsy (9); All: Kevin Kelsy (10)
- Highest home attendance: 25,218
- Biggest win: Portland 6–0 Kansas City (May 9)
- Biggest defeat: Portland 1–4 Vancouver (March 7)
Primary colors	Away colors	Third colors
- All statistics correct as of September 26, 2026.

The 2026 Portland Timbers season is the 40th season in their existence and the 16th season for the Portland Timbers in Major League Soccer (MLS), the top-flight professional soccer league in the United States and Canada.

== Competitions ==
=== Major League Soccer ===
==== MLS regular season ====
===== Western Conference =====
MLS Western Conference table (2026)
Pos	Team	Pld	W	L	T	GF	GA	GD	Pts	Qualification
5	Houston Dynamo FC	34	14	11	9	43	43	0	51	Qualification for round one
6	Los Angeles FC	34	12	11	11	52	40	+12	47	Qualification for round one
7	Portland Timbers	34	13	14	7	62	61	+1	46	Qualification for round one
8	Seattle Sounders FC	34	12	12	10	44	46	−2	46	Qualification for the wild card round
9	Real Salt Lake	34	13	15	6	53	52	+1	45	Qualification for the wild card round

Source: MLS
Rules for classification: 1) points; 2) total wins; 3) total goal differential; 4) total goals scored; 5) fewer disciplinary points; 6) away goal differential; 7) away goals scored; 8) home goals differential; 9) home goals scored; 10) coin toss (2 clubs tied) or drawing of lots (≥3 clubs tied)

===== Overall standings =====
Overall MLS standings table
Pos	Team	Pld	W	L	T	GF	GA	GD	Pts
12	Columbus Crew	34	14	15	5	59	52	+7	47
13	Los Angeles FC	34	12	11	11	52	40	+12	47
14	Portland Timbers	34	13	14	7	62	61	+1	46
15	Orlando City SC	34	13	14	7	63	78	−15	46
16	Seattle Sounders FC	34	12	12	10	44	46	−2	46

Source: MLS
Rules for classification: 1) points; 2) total wins; 3) total goal differential; 4) total goals scored; 5) fewer disciplinary points; 6) away goal differential; 7) away goals scored; 8) home goals differential; 9) home goals scored; 10) coin toss (2 clubs tied) or drawing of lots (≥3 clubs tied)

===== Matches =====
Win Draw Loss Upcoming fixture

February 21 1	Portland Timbers	3−2	Columbus Crew	Portland, Oregon
19:30 PST	Mora 14'; Antony 20'; Bye (yellow card) 29'; Lassiter 88'	Report	Abou Ali 6', (yellow card) 58'; Rossi 44'	Stadium: Providence Park; Attendance: 22,210; Referee: Allen Chapman

February 28 2	Colorado Rapids	2−0	Portland Timbers	Commerce City, Colorado
13:30 PST	Ojediran 7'; Atencio (yellow card) 22'; Herrington 53', (yellow card) 73'	Report	Pantemis (yellow card) 73'; Fory (red card) 77'; Chará (yellow card) 83'	Stadium: Dick's Sporting Goods Park; Attendance: 16,113; Referee: Jair Marrufo

March 7 3 Cascadia Cup	Portland Timbers	1−4	Vancouver Whitecaps FC	Portland, Oregon
19:30 PST	Kelsy (yellow card) 7'; Velde (yellow card) 59'; Smith (yellow card) 67'; Izoita 72'	Report	Ocampo (yellow card) 17'; White 21', 87'; Blackmon 49'; Berhalter 63'; Sabbi (yellow card) 77'; Larraz (yellow card) 83'	Stadium: Providence Park; Attendance: 22,473; Referee: Victor Rivas

March 14 4	Houston Dynamo FC	3–2	Portland Timbers	Houston, Texas
17:30 PDT	Ponce (yellow card) 45+1'; Guilherme 62', (yellow card) 90+13'; Andrade 77'; Markanich (red card) 90+4'; Bogusz 90+15'	Report	K. Miller (yellow card) 24'; Guerra 45+4'; Lassiter (yellow card) 45+5'; Fory (yellow card) 58'; Velde 80'; Mora (yellow card) 85'	Stadium: Shell Energy Stadium; Attendance: 18,026; Referee: Rubiel Vazquez

March 22 5	Portland Timbers	1−1	LA Galaxy	Portland, Oregon
13:30 PDT	Velde 13'; K. Miller (red card) 20'; Bye (yellow card) 61'; Smith (yellow card) 77'; Antony (yellow card) 81'; Bonetig (yellow card) 84'	Report	Klauss 30'; Sanabria (yellow card) 90+3'	Stadium: Providence Park; Attendance: 23,075; Referee: Drew Fischer

April 4 6 Cascadia Cup	Vancouver Whitecaps FC	3−2	Portland Timbers	Vancouver, British Columbia
19:30 PDT	Ocampo 6'; Laborda (yellow card) 68'; Müller 90+1' (pen.); Berhalter 90+5'	Report	Mosquera 36'; Da Costa 45+2'; Chará (yellow card) 80'	Stadium: BC Place; Attendance: 25,465; Referee: Joe Dickerson

April 11 7	Portland Timbers	2–1	Los Angeles FC	Portland, Oregon
13:30 PDT	Fory (yellow card) 7'; Velde 32', (yellow card) 82'; Kelsy 90+6'	Report	Evans (yellow card) 14'; Terry 49'; Smoliakov (yellow card) 58'	Stadium: Providence Park; Attendance: 24,686; Referee: Armando Villarreal

April 18 8	Minnesota United FC	2–0	Portland Timbers	Saint Paul, Minnesota
17:30 PDT	Chancalay 16' (yellow card) 26'; Yeboah 60'; Triantis (yellow card) 73'	Report		Stadium: Allianz Field; Attendance: 19,617; Referee: Nabil Bensalah

April 25 9	San Diego FC	1−2	Portland Timbers	San Diego, California
18:30 PDT	Dreyer 33' (pen.); Ingvartsen (yellow card) 63'; Soma (yellow card) 76'	Report	Kelsy 26'; Velde (yellow card) 69'; Bonetig 90+6'	Stadium: Snapdragon Stadium; Attendance: 22,396; Referee: Jon Freemon

May 2 10	Real Salt Lake	2–0	Portland Timbers	Sandy, Utah
13:30 PDT	Gozo 10'; Luna 28'; Sanabria (yellow card) 85'	Report	Fory (yellow card) 60'; Smith (yellow card) 82'	Stadium: America First Field; Attendance: 20,614; Referee: Rosendo Mendoza

May 9 11	Portland Timbers	6–0	Sporting Kansas City	Portland, Oregon
19:30 PDT	Velde 6'; Kelsy 15', 74'; Bassett 22'; Davis 26' (o.g.); Caicedo (yellow card) 33'; Lassiter 71'	Report	Berg Johnsen (yellow card) 19'; Davis (yellow card) 41'; Reid (yellow card) 45+3'; Bartlow (yellow card) 53'; Capita (yellow card) 76'	Stadium: Providence Park; Attendance: 22,384; Referee: Ramy Touchan

May 13 12	CF Montréal	2–2	Portland Timbers	Montreal, Quebec
16:30 PDT	Ríos 11', (yellow card) 90+3'; Carmona 45'; Neal (yellow card) 68'; Owusu (yellow card) 77'; Longstaff (yellow card) 81'	Report	Kelsy 21'; Bassett 77', (yellow card) 83'	Stadium: Saputo Stadium; Attendance: 12,251; Referee: Allen Chapman

May 17 13	Inter Miami CF	2–0	Portland Timbers	Miami, Florida
15:00 PDT	Messi 31'; De Paul (yellow card) 41'; Berterame 42'; Segovia (yellow card) 58'	Report	Da Costa (yellow card) 65'; Surman (yellow card) 90+2'	Stadium: Nu Stadium; Attendance: 26,715; Referee: Drew Fischer

May 23 14	Portland Timbers	1–3	San Jose Earthquakes	Portland, Oregon
18:30 PDT	Antony 18'; K. Miller (yellow card) 51'	Report	Judd 2' 12'; Munie 24'; Roberts (yellow card) 41'; Kikanović (yellow card) 45+2'; Vieira (yellow card) 73'; Daniel (yellow card) 85'	Stadium: Providence Park; Attendance: 24,686; Referee: Timothy Ford

July 16 15 Cascadia Cup	Seattle Sounders FC	1–5	Portland Timbers	Seattle, Washington
19:30 PDT	Ragen (yellow card) 41'; Rothrock (yellow card) 49'; Dotson 87'	Report	Kelsy 19', 63'; Miller 56'; Bassett 60'; Aravena 90+8'	Stadium: Lumen Field; Attendance: 35,383; Referee: Rosendo Mendoza

July 22 16	Portland Timbers	2–2	FC Dallas	Portland, Oregon
19:30 PDT	Miller (yellow card) 38'; Kelsy 66'; Bye (yellow card) 90'; Mora 90+2'; Chará (yellow card) 90+4'	Report	Delgado 45+1'; Johansson (yellow card) 58'; Musa 88'; Ibeagha (yellow card) 90+6'	Stadium: Providence Park; Attendance: 20,184; Referee: Alexis Da Silva

July 25 17	Portland Timbers	2–1	Real Salt Lake	Portland, Oregon
19:30 PDT	Bassett (yellow card) 10'; Chará (yellow card) 41'; Mora 56', 67'	Report	Sanabria 18'; Guilavogui (red card) 31'; Solans (yellow card) 55'	Stadium: Providence Park; Attendance: 22,893; Referee: Elijio Arreguin

August 1 18 Cascadia Cup	Portland Timbers	2–1	Seattle Sounders FC	Portland, Oregon
19:45 PDT	Miller (yellow card) 30'; Kelsy 41', (yellow card) 45+5'; Bye 82'	Report	Kingston (yellow card) 25'; Kossa-Rienzi 27'; Gomex (yellow card) 71'	Stadium: Providence Park; Attendance: 24,686; Referee: Joe Dickerson

August 16 19	Chicago Fire FC	2–1	Portland Timbers	Chicago, Illinois
15:30 PDT	Lod 9', (yellow card) 57'; D'Avilla 14'; Salétros (yellow card) 79'	Report	Bye (yellow card) 51'; Surman 85'; Janssen (yellow card) 90+4'	Stadium: Soldier Field; Attendance: 30,168; Referee: Chris Penso

August 19 20	Portland Timbers	3–1	San Diego FC	Portland, Oregon
19:30 PDT	Lassiter (yellow card) 17', (goal) 51'; Velde 29'; Da Costa 68'; Kelsy (yellow card) 90+6'	Report	Pirani 45+1'; Verhoeven (yellow card) 90+1'	Stadium: Providence Park; Attendance: 20,617; Referee: Rubiel Vazquez

August 22 21	Los Angeles FC	1–1	Portland Timbers	Los Angeles, California
19:30 PDT	Choinière (yellow card) 16'; Bouanga 79', (yellow card) 87'	Report	Da Costa 4'; Kelsy (yellow card) 31'; Janssen (yellow card) 89' (red card) 90+3'	Stadium: BMO Stadium; Attendance: 22,246; Referee: Jon Freemon

August 29 22	Portland Timbers	1–2	Austin FC	Portland, Oregon
19:30 PDT	Caicedo (yellow card) 88'; Antony 89' (pen.)	Report	Torres 25'; Guilherme Biro (yellow card) 35'; Desler (yellow card) 47'; Svatok (yellow card) 88', (goal) 90+3'; Rosales (yellow card) 90+7'	Stadium: Providence Park; Attendance: 20,952; Referee: Guido Gonzales Jr.

September 5 23	Portland Timbers	5–4	Minnesota United FC	Portland, Oregon
19:30 PDT	Janssen 11' (pen.), 26', 55'; Callender 20' (o.g.); Surman (yellow card) 45+7'; Velde 71'	Report	Boxall (yellow card) 24'; Caldeira 32', 50'; Markanich 37'; Díaz (yellow card) 74'; Chancalay 90+2'; Duggan (yellow card) 90+6'	Stadium: Providence Park; Attendance: 20,632; Referee: Filip Dujic

September 9 24	Portland Timbers	2–2	St. Louis City SC	Portland, Oregon
19:30 PDT	Velde 32', 89'; E. Miller (yellow card) 58'	Report	Navarro 1', 51', (yellow card) 67'; Polvara (yellow card) 31'; Orozco (yellow card) 36'; Totland (yellow card) 45+2'	Stadium: Providence Park; Attendance: 19,351; Referee: Fotis Bazakos

September 12 25	FC Dallas	2–1	Portland Timbers	Frisco, Texas
17:30 PDT	Farrington 45'; Kaick (yellow card) 47'; Valiente 87'	Report	Lassiter 90+3'	Stadium: Toyota Stadium; Attendance: 10,925; Referee: Timothy Ford

September 19 26	Portland Timbers	0–1	Atlanta United FC	Portland, Oregon
19:30 PDT	Chará (yellow card) 25'; Waterman (yellow card) 45+1'	Report	Miranchuk 28'; Galoppo (yellow card) 45+1'; Muyumba (yellow card) 64'	Stadium: Providence Park; Attendance: 22,874; Referee: Ismail Elfath

September 26 27	San Jose Earthquakes	3–1	Portland Timbers	San Jose, California
19:30 PDT	Judd 4', 29', (yellow card) 30'; Löwen 24'; Roberts (yellow card) 40'	Report	Miller (yellow card) 76'	Stadium: PayPal Park; Attendance: 15,061; Referee: Lorenzo Hernandez

October 10 28	Sporting Kansas City	3–3	Portland Timbers	Kansas City, Kansas
17:30 PDT	André Luiz (penalty missed) 45+7', 45+7', 73'; Reynolds 70'	Report	Da Costa 10'; Janssen (yellow card) 12', (goal) 45+4'; Lassiter 64'	Stadium: Sporting Park; Attendance: 14,825; Referee: Pierre-Luc Lauziere

October 14 29	LA Galaxy	2–0	Portland Timbers	Carson, California
19:30 PDT	Reus 18'; Ruiz (yellow card) 29'; Roberton (yellow card) 31'; Haak (yellow card) 47', (goal) 80'	Report	Fory (yellow card) 39'; Velde (yellow card) 62'; Da Costa (yellow card) 82'	Stadium: Dignity Health Sports Park; Attendance: 13,337; Referee: Chris Pensos

October 17 30	Portland Timbers	0–0	Colorado Rapids	Portland, Oregon
19:30 PDT	Velde (yellow card) 43'	Report	Holding (yellow card) 13'; Whittaker (yellow card) 43'; Thompson (yellow card) 45+2'	Stadium: Providence Park; Attendance: 23,614; Referee: Elijio Arreguin

October 24 31	Portland Timbers	3–2	Charlotte FC	Portland, Oregon
19:30 PDT	Lassiter 11', 40'; Izoita (yellow card) 17'; Aravena 90+6'	Report	Biel 3'; Byrne (yellow card) 45'; Toklomati 69'	Stadium: Providence Park; Attendance: 23,323; Referee: Rosendo Mendoza

October 28 32	St. Louis City SC	2–3	Portland Timbers	St. Louis, Missouri
17:30 PDT	Edelman 58'; Navarro 90+1'	Report	Velde 42', 48'; Da Costa 45+3'; Izoita (yellow card) 62'; Miller (yellow card) 71' (red card) 90+6'; Janssen (yellow card) 84'; Smith (yellow card) 88'	Stadium: Energizer Park; Referee: Rubiel Vazquez

November 1 33	Portland Timbers	3–1	Houston Dynamo FC	Portland, Oregon
18:45 PST	Smith (yellow card) 18'; Da Costa 25'; Velde 65'; Janssen 78'; Chará (yellow card) 90+3'	Report	Samassékou (yellow card) 40'; Resch (yellow card) 61'; Bouzat 71'	Stadium: Providence Park; Attendance: 22,936; Referee: Drew Fischer

November 7 34	Austin FC	0–2	Portland Timbers	Austin, Texas
16:00 PST	Burton (yellow card) 57'	Report	Lassiter 3'; Velde 70'	Stadium: Q2 Stadium; Attendance: 20,738; Referee: Victor Rivas

=== MLS Cup Playoffs ===
==== Round one ====
November 21 Game 1	FC Dallas	3–0	Portland Timbers	Frisco, Texas
13:00 PST	Johansson (yellow card) 32'; Valiente 53', 55'; Kamungo (yellow card) 90+1'; Sarver 90+4'	Report		Stadium: Toyota Stadium; Attendance: 10,925; Referee: Alexis Da Silva

November 28 Game 2	Portland Timbers	v	FC Dallas	Portland, Oregon
19:30 PST				Stadium: Providence Park

December 2 Game 3 (If necessary)	FC Dallas	v	Portland Timbers	Frisco, Texas
TBD				Stadium: Toyota Stadium

=== Leagues Cup ===
August 6 Round One	Portland Timbers (United States)	5–2	(Mexico) Puebla	Portland, Oregon
19:30 PDT	Lassiter 5', 56'; Bassett 36', 45+3'; Da Costa 38'	Report	Mustre 14'; Gómez 80'; Sanabria (yellow card) 81'; Leyva (yellow card) 90+1'	Stadium: Providence Park; Attendance: 11,330; Referee: Victor Rivas

August 9 Round One	América (Mexico)	3–1	(United States) Portland Timbers	Portland, Oregon
19:15 PDT	Rodríguez 6'; Juárez (yellow card) 30'; Violante 63'; Espinoza (yellow card) 70'; Vázquez (yellow card) 77'; Cervantes (yellow card) 79'; Perea 88'	Report	Velde 19', (yellow card) 90'; Chará (yellow card) 39'; Fory (yellow card) 59'; Bye (yellow card) 67'	Stadium: Providence Park; Attendance: 20,897; Referee: Walter López

August 13 Round One	Portland Timbers (United States)	3–1	(Mexico) Tijuana	Portland, Oregon
19:30 PDT	Kelsy 40'; Miller (yellow card) 41'; Velde (yellow card) 45+3'; Antony 64'; Lassiter 77'; Ortiz (yellow card) 89'	Report	El Ghezouani 19'; Vega (yellow card) 36'	Stadium: Providence Park; Attendance: 21,586; Referee: Ismael Cornejo

== Transfers ==
Per league and club policy, terms of the deals are not disclosed except Targeted Allocation Money, General Allocation Money, draft picks, and international rosters spots.

=== Transfers in ===
No.	Pos.	Player	Transferred from	Fee	Date	Source
Winter 2025–26
5	DF	(United States) Brandon Bye	(United States) New England Revolution	Free	December 22, 2025	
16	DF	(United States) Sawyer Jura	(United States) Portland Timbers 2	Homegrown contract	January 1, 2026	
6	DF	(Australia) Alex Bonetig	(Australia) Western Sydney Wanderers	Undisclosed	January 8, 2026	
17	MF	(United States) Cole Bassett	(United States) Colorado Rapids	$2.65M	February 2, 2026	
30	MF	(Colombia) José Caicedo	(Mexico) UNAM	Undisclosed	March 13, 2026	

=== Transfers out ===
No.	Pos.	Player	Transferred to	Fee	Date	Source
Winter 2025–26
	GK	(Canada) Maxime Crépeau	(United States) Orlando City	Free	January 6, 2026	
	GK	(Paraguay) Cristhian Paredes	(Paraguay) Cerro Porteño	Free	January 7, 2026	
	MF	(Argentina) David Ayala	(United States) Inter Miami	Trade	January 9, 2026	

== Team statistics ==
=== MLS regular season ===
==== Goals ====
As of February 21, 2026

Name	Nat	Games	Goals

==== Assists ====
As of February 21, 2026

Name	Nat	Games	Assists

==== Goalkeeping ====
As of February 21, 2026

Name	Nat	Games	Saves	Clean Sheets
