= Mihail Gherasimencov =

Moldovan footballer (born 2005)

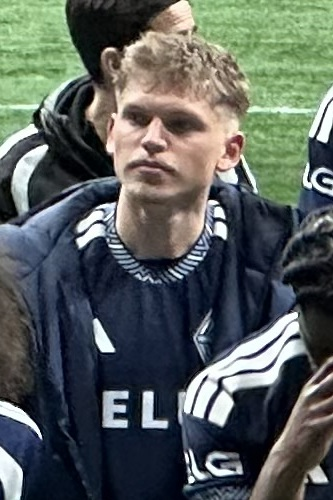
- Gherasimencov in 2026

Personal information
- Date of birth: 25 March 2005 (age 21)
- Place of birth: Bălți, Moldova
- Height: 1.78 m (5 ft 10 in)
- Position: Left-back

Team information
- Current team: Vancouver Whitecaps FC
- Number: 29

Youth career
- Calgary Blizzard SC
- Whitecaps FC Alberta Academy Centre
- 2020–2022: Vancouver Whitecaps FC

Senior career*
Years	Team	Apps	(Gls)
2022–2025	Whitecaps FC 2	49	(4)
2024	→ Vancouver Whitecaps FC (loan)	0	(0)
2025	→ Cavalry FC (loan)	24	(2)
2026–	Vancouver Whitecaps FC	11	(1)
2026–	→ Whitecaps FC 2 (loan)	2	(0)

International career^{‡}
2023–2025	Moldova U19	5	(1)
2025	Moldova U21	4	(0)
2025–	Moldova	13	(0)
- * Club domestic league appearances and goals as of Novmeber 13, 2026 ‡ National team caps and goals as of November 17, 2026

Mihail Gherasimencov (born 25 March 2005) is a Moldovan professional footballer who plays as a left-back for Major League Soccer club Vancouver Whitecaps FC and the Moldova national team.

== Early life ==
Gherasimencov was born in Bălți, Moldova and he lived there until 2016, when he moved to Calgary, Canada. In Canada, he played youth soccer with Calgary Blizzard SC, before joining the Whitecaps Alberta Academy Centre. In August 2020, he joined the official Vancouver Whitecaps Academy. In 2022, he was invited to participate in the MLS Next All-Star Game, which featured the top academy players from across the league. In January 2023, he attended the first team's pre-season training camp.

== Club career ==
He made his professional debut with Whitecaps FC 2 in MLS Next Pro match against the Real Monarchs, playing 44 minutes off the bench, in a 3–1 loss on 5 August 2022. In March 2023, he signed a professional contract with Whitecaps FC 2. Gherasimencov scored his first professional goal against Colorado Rapids 2, on 8 July 2023. After the 2023 season, the club picked up his option for the 2024 season. In July 2024, he signed a short-term loan with the first team, ahead of a friendly against Wrexham. In December 2024, he re-signed with Whitecaps 2 for the 2025 season.

In March 2025, he went on loan to Canadian Premier League club Cavalry FC.

In December 2025, he signed a Homegrown Player contract with the Vancouver Whitecaps FC first team through the 2027–28 season, with a club option for the 2028–29 season.

== International career ==
In April 2023, Gherasimencov was called up to a four-day training camp with the Moldova U19 national team. In June 2023, he was called up for a pair of friendlies against Kazakhstan U19. He made his debut in the first match and scored his first goal in the second match.

== Career statistics ==
=== Club ===
As of November 13, 2026

Appearances and goals by club, season and competition
Club	Season	League			Playoffs		National cup		Continental		Total	
Club	Season	Division	Apps	Goals	Apps	Goals	Apps	Goals	Apps	Goals	Apps	Goals
Whitecaps FC 2	2022	MLS Next Pro	1	0	–		–		–		1	0
Whitecaps FC 2	2023	MLS Next Pro	22	2	–		–		–		22	2
Whitecaps FC 2	2024	MLS Next Pro	26	2	1	0	–		–		27	2
Whitecaps FC 2	2026	MLS Next Pro	2	0	0	0	–		–		2	0
Whitecaps FC 2	Total		51	4	1	0	0	0	0	0	52	4
Cavalry FC (loan)	2025	Canadian Premier League	24	2	3	0	3	0	0	0	30	2
Vancouver Whitecaps FC	2026	Major League Soccer	11	1	0	0	3	0	0	0	14	1
Career total			86	7	4	0	3	0	0	0	96	7
