= Aleksa Cvetković =

Serbian footballer (born 2007)

Personal information
- Date of birth: 13 May 2005 (age 21)
- Place of birth: Serbia
- Height: 1.80 m (5 ft 11 in)
- Position: Midfielder

Team information
- Current team: Vancouver Whitecaps
- Number: 23

Youth career
- –2021: Radnički
- 2021–2022: Crvena zvezda
- 2023: Grafičar
- 2023–2024: Crvena zvezda

Senior career*
| Years | Team | Apps | (Gls) |
| 2023 | Grafičar | 2 | (0) |
| 2024–2026 | OFK Beograd | 72 | (7) |
| 2026– | Vancouver Whitecaps | 5 | (0) |

International career^{‡}
| 2024– | Serbia U21 | 6 | (1) |
- * Club domestic league appearances and goals as of 17 October 2026 ‡ National team caps and goals as of 8 September 2025

Aleksa Cvetković (Serbian Cyrillic: Алекса Цветковић; born 13 May 2005) is a Serbian professional footballer who plays as a midfielder for Vancouver Whitecaps.

== Early life ==
Cvetković was born on 13 May 2005. Born in Serbia, he is a native of Vinarce, Serbia.

== Club career ==
As a youth player, Cvetković joined the youth academy of Radnički. Following his stint there, he joined the youth academy of Crvena zvezda. Subsequently, he signed for Grafičar before returning to the youth academy of Crvena zvezda the same year.

Ahead of the 2024–25 season, he signed for OFK Beograd, where he made seventy-two league appearances and scored seven goals and recorded nine assists and received interest from Polish side Raków Częstochowa. During the summer of 2026, he signed for Canadian side Vancouver Whitecaps.

== International career ==
Cvetković is a Serbia youth international and has represented the country internationally at under-21 level.

On 19 November 2024, he debuted for the Serbia national under-21 football team during a 2–1 away friendly win over the Turkey national under-21 football team.

== Style of play ==
Serbian news website MaxBet Sport wrote in 2026 that "what sets him apart is his versatility, he is a football player who can respond to multiple demands on the field, as reliable in the defensive as he is concrete in the attacking phase. With pronounced physical predispositions, work ethic and tactical discipline".
