= Rayan Elloumi =

Canadian-Tunisian footballer (born 2007)

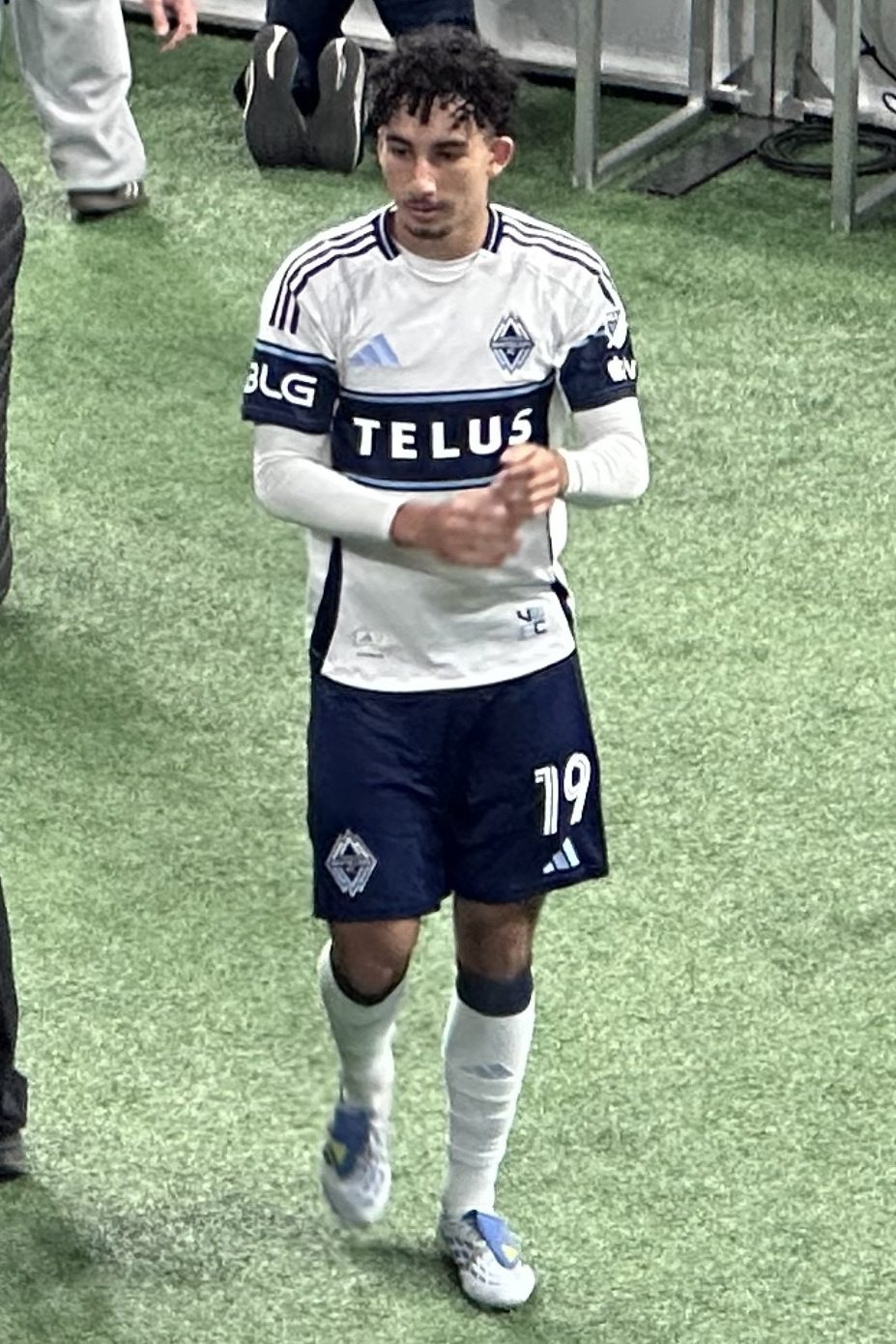
- Elloumi in 2026

Personal information
- Date of birth: 17 September 2007 (age 19)
- Place of birth: St. Albert, Alberta, Canada
- Height: 1.83 m (6 ft 0 in)
- Position: Forward

Team information
- Current team: Vancouver Whitecaps FC
- Number: 19

Youth career
- Edmonton Juventus SC
- Edmonton BTB SC
- 2023–2024: Vancouver Whitecaps FC

Senior career*
Years	Team	Apps	(Gls)
2024	Whitecaps FC Academy	1	(0)
2024–2025	Whitecaps FC 2	22	(12)
2025	→ Vancouver Whitecaps FC (loan)	1	(0)
2025–	Vancouver Whitecaps FC	8	(2)
2026–	→ Whitecaps FC 2 (loan)	2	(1)

International career^{‡}
2025–	Tunisia U23	1	(1)
2026	Canada B	1	(0)
2026–	Tunisia	4	(0)
- * Club domestic league appearances and goals as of 6 June 2026 ‡ National team caps and goals as of 6 June 2026

Rayan Elloumi (Arabic: ريان اللومي; born 17 September 2007) is a footballer who plays for Vancouver Whitecaps FC in Major League Soccer. Born in Canada, he represents the Tunisia national team.

== Early life ==
Elloumi played youth soccer with Edmonton Juventus SC, before joining Edmonton BTB SC as a teenager, while spending some time in the Whitecaps FC BMO Academy Centre in Edmonton, until eventually joining the Vancouver Whitecaps FC Academy in August 2023.

== Club career ==
Elloumi began playing with Whitecaps FC Academy in League1 British Columbia in 2024.

On 9 June 2024, he made his professional debut with Whitecaps FC 2 in MLS Next Pro, in a 4–0 victory over Los Angeles FC 2. On 6 October 2024, he scored his first goal in a 3–1 loss to Houston Dynamo 2. In June 2025, he signed a professional contract with Whitecaps FC 2 (after previously playing as an academy call-up). In June 2025, he signed a short-term loan with the Vancouver Whitecaps FC first team. He signed additional loans with the first team that month as well. He made his Major League Soccer debut on 14 June 2025, against the Columbus Crew. At the end of the 2025 season, he was named the Whitecaps FC 2 player of the year.

On 12 September 2025, Elloumi signed a Homegrown Player contract with the Vancouver Whitecaps FC through the 2028 season, with options for 2029 and 2030. He scored his first MLS goal the following night at the age of 17 in the Whitecaps' 7–0 victory over the Philadelphia Union, becoming the first Whitecaps homegrown player in club history to score on his home debut.

== International career ==
Born in Canada, Elloumi is of Tunisian descent.

=== Youth ===
In August 2025, Elloumi was called up to the Canada U18 team for a series of friendlies, although he ultimately left the camp to remain with the Whitecaps to play in league matches.

In September 2025, the Tunisian Football Federation announced that Elloumi had agreed to represent the nation at international level. He was called up to the Tunisia U23, where scored in his debut, a 3–0 win over Iraq U23 on 11 October 2025.

=== Canada ===
In January 2026, Elloumi was named to the Canada senior team for the first time for a training camp and friendly against Guatemala. He appeared in the match against Guatemala, in his first senior appearance, however, as it was designated a B-level friendly, it did not count as an official senior cap.

=== Tunisia ===
Elloumi with Tunisia against Belgium in June 2026.

In March 2026, Elloumi was called up to the Tunisia senior team for two friendly matches against Haiti and his country of birth, Canada. Later that year, on 15 May, he was included in Tunisia's squad for the 2026 FIFA World Cup.

== Career statistics ==
=== Club ===
As of match played 15 March 2026

Appearances and goals by club, season and competition
Club	Season	League			Playoffs		National cup		Continental		Total	
Club	Season	Division	Apps	Goals	Apps	Goals	Apps	Goals	Apps	Goals	Apps	Goals
Whitecaps FC Academy	2024	League1 British Columbia	1	0	0	0	—		—		1	0
Whitecaps FC 2	2024	MLS Next Pro	4	1	0	0	—		—		4	1
Whitecaps FC 2	2025	MLS Next Pro	18	11	0	0	—		—		18	11
Whitecaps FC 2	Total		22	12	0	0	0	0	0	0	22	12
Vancouver Whitecaps FC (loan)	2025	Major League Soccer	1	0	0	0	0	0	0	0	1	0
Vancouver Whitecaps FC	2025	Major League Soccer	6	2	3	0	2	0	0	0	11	2
Vancouver Whitecaps FC	2026	Major League Soccer	2	0	0	0	0	0	3	0	5	0
Vancouver Whitecaps FC	Whitecaps total		9	2	3	0	2	0	3	0	17	2
Career total			32	14	3	0	2	0	3	0	40	14
