= Vinarce =

- Town
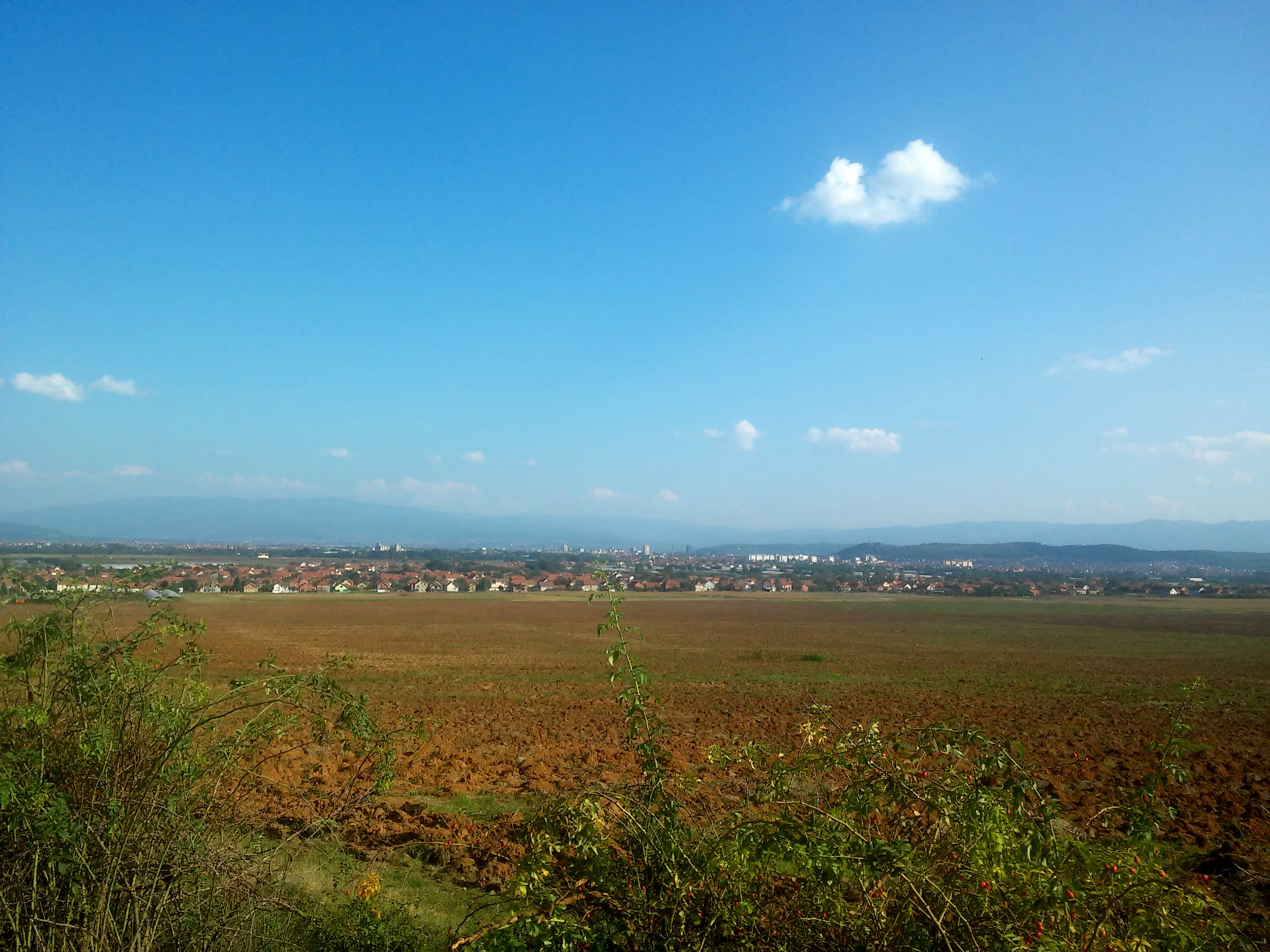

- Location within Serbia
- Coordinates: 43°01′N 21°55′E
- Country: Serbia
- District: Jablanica District
- Municipality: Leskovac
- Elevation: 696 ft (212 m)

Population (2002)
  - Total: 3,090
- Time zone: UTC+1 (CET)
  - Summer (DST): UTC+2 (CEST)

Vinarce is a town in the municipality of Leskovac, Serbia. According to the 2002 census, the town has a population of 3090 people.
