= Bruno Caicedo =

Ecuadorian footballer (born 2005)

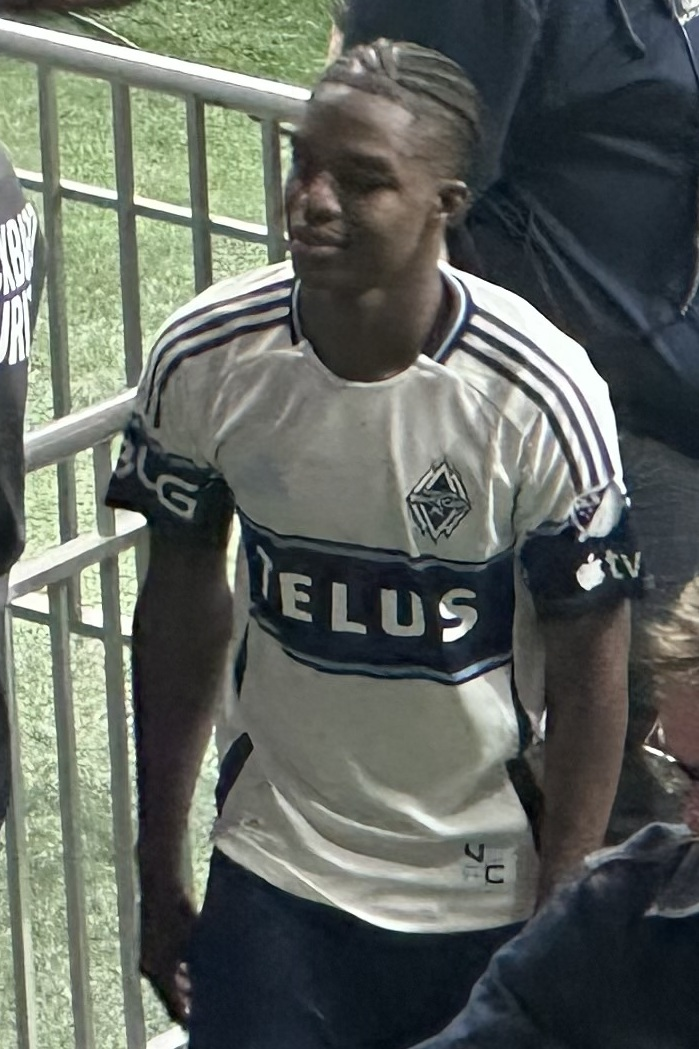
- Caicedo in 2026

Personal information
- Full name: Bruno Steven Caicedo Quiñónez
- Date of birth: 15 January 2005 (age 21)
- Place of birth: Esmeraldas, Ecuador
- Height: 1.86 m (6 ft 1 in)
- Position: Winger

Team information
- Current team: Vancouver Whitecaps
- Number: 14

Youth career
- –2023: Barcelona SC
- 2023: → Flamengo (loan)

Senior career*
Years	Team	Apps	(Gls)
2024–2025	Barcelona SC	0	(0)
2024	→ Cumbayá (loan)	21	(1)
2025	→ Orense (loan)	30	(3)
2026–	Vancouver Whitecaps	11	(3)

International career^{‡}
2024–	Ecuador U20	4	(0)
- * Club domestic league appearances and goals as of 21 December 2025 ‡ National team caps and goals as of 1 February 2025

Bruno Steven Caicedo Quiñónez (born 15 January 2005) is an Ecuadorian professional footballer who plays as a winger for Major League Soccer club Vancouver Whitecaps.

== Early life ==
Caicedo was born on 15 January 2005. Born in Esmeraldas Province, Ecuador, he is a native of the province.

== Club career ==
As a youth player, Caicedo joined the youth academy of Ecuadorian side Barcelona SC and was promoted to the club's senior team in 2020, where he made zero league appearances and scored zero goals. Subsequently, he was sent on loan to the youth academy of Brazilian side Flamengo in 2023.

One year later, he was sent on loan to Ecuadorian side Cumbayá, where he made twenty-one league appearances and scored one goal. Ahead of the 2025 season, he was sent on loan to Ecuadorian side Orense, where he made thirty league appearances and scored three goals. Following his stint there, he signed for Canadian side Vancouver Whitecaps in 2026.

== International career ==
Caicedo is an Ecuador youth international. During January and February 2025, he played for the Ecuador national under-20 football team at the 2025 South American U-20 Championship.

Caicedo received his first senior call-up against Saudi Arabia on May 30 2026 ahead of the FIFA World Cup 2026. He did not make an appearance and was not selected for Ecuador's final 26-man squad.
