= Daniel González (footballer, born 2004) =

Mexican footballer

Personal information
- Full name: José Daniel González Pichardo
- Date of birth: 12 November 2004 (age 22)
- Place of birth: Gustavo A. Madero, Mexico City, Mexico
- Height: 1.71 m (5 ft 7 in)
- Position: Forward

Team information
- Current team: Atlante (on loan from UNAM)
- Number: 16

Youth career
- 2019–2022: UNAM

Senior career*
Years	Team	Apps	(Gls)
2022–	UNAM	2	(0)
2022–2023	→ Pumas Tabasco (loan)	16	(2)
2026–	→ Atlante (loan)	26	(1)
- * Club domestic league appearances and goals as of 20 November 2026

José Daniel González Pichardo (born 12 November 2004) is a Mexican professional footballer who plays as a forward for Liga MX club Atlante, on loan from UNAM.

== Career statistics ==
=== Club ===
As of match played on 20 November 2026

Club	Season	League			Cup		Continental		Other		Total	
Club	Season	Division	Apps	Goals	Apps	Goals	Apps	Goals	Apps	Goals	Apps	Goals
UNAM	2022–23	Liga MX	2	0	—		—		—		2	0
Pumas Tabasco (loan)	2022–23	Liga de Expansión MX	16	2	—		—		—		16	2
Atlante (loan)	2025–26	Liga de Expansión MX	14	1	—		—		—		14	1
Atlante (loan)	2026–27	Liga MX	12	0	—		—		3 (Note: Appearance in Leagues Cup)	0	15	0
Atlante (loan)	Career total		26	1	—		—		3	0	29	1
Career total			44	3	0	0	0	0	3	0	47	3
