= Édier Ocampo =

Colombian footballer (born 2003)

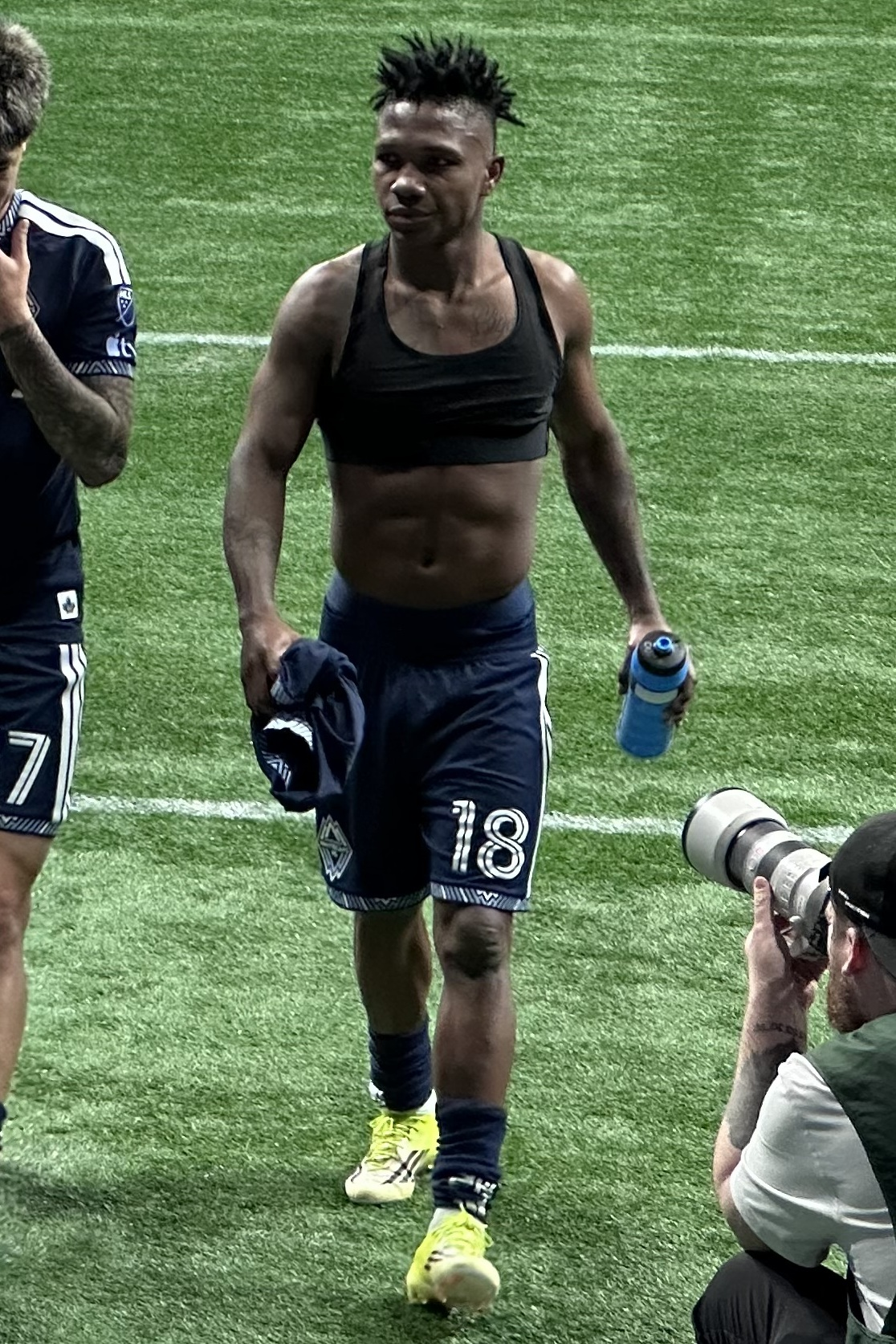
- Ocampo in 2026

Personal information
- Full name: Édier Ocampo Vidal
- Date of birth: 3 October 2003 (age 23)
- Place of birth: Tumaco, Colombia
- Height: 1.73 m (5 ft 8 in)
- Position: Right-back

Team information
- Current team: Vancouver Whitecaps FC
- Number: 18

Youth career
- 2011–2020: Sur Oriente
- 2020–2022: Atlético Nacional

Senior career*
Years	Team	Apps	(Gls)
2022–2024	Atlético Nacional	30	(1)
2022	→ Fortaleza C.E.I.F. (loan)	17	(0)
2024–	Vancouver Whitecaps FC	59	(4)

International career^{‡}
2021	Colombia U19	3	(0)
2022–2023	Colombia U20	21	(0)
2023	Colombia U23	1	(0)
2026–	Colombia	1	(0)
- * Club domestic league appearances and goals as of 19 September 2026 ‡ National team caps and goals as of 2 October 2026

Édier Ocampo Vidal (born 3 October 2003) is a Colombian professional footballer who plays as a right-back for Major League Soccer club Vancouver Whitecaps and the Colombia national team.

Ocampo came through the Atlético Nacional academy and won the 2023 Copa Colombia and the 2023 Superliga Colombiana with the club before moving to Vancouver in August 2024. In 2025 he established himself as a first-choice starter as the Whitecaps won the Canadian Championship and finished as runners-up in both MLS Cup and the CONCACAF Champions Cup.

A Colombia youth international at under-19, under-20 and under-23 level, Ocampo played at the 2023 FIFA U-20 World Cup and won a bronze medal at the 2022 South American Games. He received his first senior call-up in September 2026.

== Early life ==
Born in Tumaco, on Colombia's Pacific coast, Ocampo began playing with the grassroots side Sur Oriente at the age of seven. He was first scouted by Atlético Nacional at 13 but could not join because of a knee injury; he was offered an academy place after impressing against the club at under-17 level.

== Club career ==
=== Atlético Nacional ===
Ocampo spent the 2022 season on loan at Categoría Primera B side Fortaleza C.E.I.F., making seventeen appearances.

He became a regular at Nacional in 2023, making 35 appearances in all competitions as the club won the 2023 Copa Colombia and the 2023 Superliga Colombiana. In June 2023 he was linked with a move to Bundesliga club Union Berlin.

=== Vancouver Whitecaps FC ===
On 8 August 2024, Ocampo joined Major League Soccer side Vancouver Whitecaps FC on a contract through 2027 with a club option for 2028, occupying an international and MLS U22 Initiative roster slot. Sporting director Axel Schuster described him as a fast, explosive wing-back, aggressive on both sides of the ball and direct in his play. He made six regular-season appearances in the remainder of the season, only one of them a start, and was part of the squad that won the 2024 Canadian Championship, beating Toronto FC on penalties at BC Place on 25 September for a third consecutive Voyageurs Cup.

Ocampo displaced the incumbent at right-back in 2025 and started 26 of his 30 MLS regular-season appearances, scoring twice and adding two assists.

His most significant contribution came in the 2025 CONCACAF Champions Cup. In the second leg of the round of 16, away to Monterrey on 12 March, he equalised in the 57th minute in a 2–2 draw that sent Vancouver through 3–3 on away goals against a side featuring Sergio Ramos and Sergio Canales. After eliminating Pumas UNAM in the quarter-finals, he played the full 180 minutes of the semi-final against Inter Miami, which Vancouver won 5–1 on aggregate with a 3–1 victory in Florida on 30 April; Colombian media highlighted his defensive work against Lionel Messi. Vancouver lost the final 5–0 to Cruz Azul at the Estadio Olímpico Universitario on 1 June.

The Whitecaps retained the Canadian Championship on 1 October, beating Vancouver FC 4–2 in the final, and reached MLS Cup, where Ocampo started all five playoff matches before a 3–1 defeat to Inter Miami on 6 December. He finished the season with 47 appearances, 42 of them starts, three goals and four assists, was named to the MLS Team of the Matchday twice, and won the club's Most Promising Player award.

By the time of his first senior international call-up in September 2026, Ocampo had made 33 appearances in all competitions during the season, starting 30, with two goals and a team-leading eight assists.

== International career ==
=== Youth ===
Ocampo made 25 appearances across Colombia's under-19, under-20 and under-23 teams. He was called up for the 2022 Maurice Revello Tournament, where, in the penalty shoot-out after a 0–0 draw with Venezuela, he celebrated his successful kick with a dance echoing Yerry Mina's at the 2021 Copa América. His goal put Colombia 4–3 up with one more needed to win, but the next three were missed and Ocampo was criticised for celebrating prematurely. Later that year he started four of five matches as Colombia's under-20 side took bronze at the 2022 South American Games.

He played at the 2023 South American U-20 Championship, drawing praise for his performance in the opening game against Paraguay. At the 2023 FIFA U-20 World Cup in Argentina he started all four of Colombia's matches, assisting in the round-of-16 win over Slovakia before elimination by Italy in the quarter-finals. He had been an injury doubt before the group game against Japan after a challenge in training by Miguel Monsalve, with Devan Tanton reported as his replacement, but played before being substituted late on.

=== Senior ===
On 17 September 2026, Ocampo was named in a senior Colombia squad for the first time, for friendlies against Mexico, Paraguay and Peru in the United States. He made his debut against Paraguay on 2 October 2026.

== Style of play ==
Ocampo is a right-sided defender who has played as an orthodox full-back and a wing-back, and has deputized at left-back. Vancouver signed him to fill the right wing-back role in the 3–4–3 then used by Vanni Sartini, and he covered at left-back early in the 2025 season under Jesper Sørensen, whose side defends in a 4–3–3 but pushes its full-backs high to form a back three in possession.

Assessing the transfer, Canadian football analyst Joshua Rey identified ball progression as the clearest strength of Ocampo's game, placing him in the 96th percentile among comparable players for progressive passes and carries in the Copa Libertadores, and rating his crossing, his forward passing and his duelling in one-against-one situations at both ends. Rey also judged that Ocampo lacked the top-end pace the position increasingly demands, and expected him to need time to adapt to zonal defensive schemes after a career spent entirely in Colombia.

His attacking output has since become his most visible contribution: he led Vancouver for assists in 2026, with eight in all competitions by the middle of September.

== Career statistics ==
=== Club ===
As of 19 September 2026

Appearances and goals by club, season and competition
Club	Season	League			Cup		Continental		Other		Total	
Club	Season	Division	Apps	Goals	Apps	Goals	Apps	Goals	Apps	Goals	Apps	Goals
Atlético Nacional	2023	Liga DIMAYOR	23	0	8	0	4	0	0	0	35	0
Atlético Nacional	2024	Liga DIMAYOR	7	1	0	0	0	0	0	0	7	1
Atlético Nacional	Total		30	1	8	0	4	0	0	0	42	1
Fortaleza C.E.I.F. (loan)	2022	Categoría Primera B	17	0	0	0	–		0	0	17	0
Vancouver Whitecaps FC	2024	Major League Soccer	6	0	0	0	0	0	1 (Note: Vancouver Whitecaps FC record seven appearances in all competitions for Ocampo in 2024, of which six were in MLS regular-season play. The competition of the seventh is not specified in available sources.)	0	7	0
Vancouver Whitecaps FC	2025	Major League Soccer	30	2	4	0	8	1	5	0	47	3
Vancouver Whitecaps FC	2026	Major League Soccer	23	2	4	0	4	0	3	0	34	2
Vancouver Whitecaps FC	Total		59	4	8	0	12	1	9	0	88	5
Career total			106	5	16	0	16	1	9	0	147	6

=== International ===
As of match played 2 October 2026

Appearances and goals by national team and year
National team	Year	Apps	Goals
Colombia	2026	1	0
Total		1	0

== Honours ==
Atlético Nacional

- Copa Colombia: 2023
- Superliga Colombiana: 2023

Vancouver Whitecaps FC

- Canadian Championship: 2024, 2025
- MLS Cup runner-up: 2025
- CONCACAF Champions Cup runner-up: 2025

Colombia U20

- 2022 South American Games bronze medal

Individual

- Vancouver Whitecaps FC Most Promising Player: 2025
