= Kevin Kelsy =

Venezuelan footballer (born 2004)

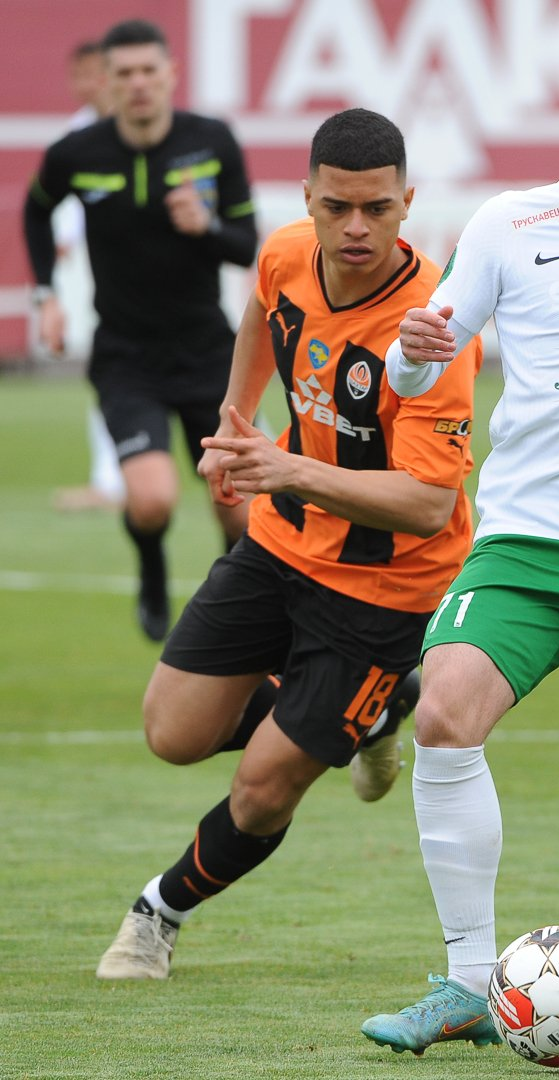
- Kelsy playing for Shakhtar Donetsk in 2024

Personal information
- Full name: Kevin Jesús Kelsy Genez
- Date of birth: 27 July 2004 (age 22)
- Place of birth: Valencia, Venezuela
- Height: 1.93 m (6 ft 4 in)
- Position: Forward

Team information
- Current team: Rangers
- Number: 19

Youth career
- Mineros de Guayana

Senior career*
Years	Team	Apps	(Gls)
2021–2022	Mineros de Guayana	33	(5)
2023	Boston River	0	(0)
2023–2025	Shakhtar Donetsk	27	(7)
2024	→ FC Cincinnati (loan)	23	(6)
2025–2026	Portland Timbers	53	(16)
2026–	Rangers	7	(4)

International career^{‡}
2022–2023	Venezuela U20	11	(2)
2024	Venezuela U23	5	(2)
2025–	Venezuela	8	(1)
- * Club domestic league appearances and goals as of 28 October 2026 ‡ National team caps and goals as of 02 October 2026

Kevin Jesús Kelsy Genez (born 27 July 2004) is a Venezuelan professional footballer who plays as a forward for Scottish Premiership club Rangers and the Venezuela national team.

== Club career ==
=== Early career ===
Having broken into the first team at Mineros de Guayana in 2021, Kelsy went on to establish himself in the 2022 season, scoring his first goals for the club. Kelsy transferred to Liga AUF Uruguaya club Boston River on 1 January 2023. He was subsequently transferred before making any appearances for the Montevideo-based side.

=== Shakhtar Donetsk ===
On 31 January 2023, Shakhtar Donetsk announced the signing of Kelsy from Boston River on a contract until the end of December 2027. He signed with the Ukrainian club during the Russian invasion of Ukraine.

On 23 February 2023, Kelsy was a substitute during the Europa League Playoff 2nd Leg against Rennes. In the penalty shootout he scored the deciding goal that took Shakhtar Donetsk to the Round of 16.

On 19 September 2023, Kelsy scored on his UEFA Champions League debut against FC Porto in a 3–1 loss, becoming the fourth-youngest South American to score in the competition behind Roque Santa Cruz, Lionel Messi and Rodrygo.

=== FC Cincinnati ===
On 30 April 2024, MLS side FC Cincinnati announced Kelsy's acquisition via loan for the remainder of the 2024 season with an option to buy as part of the MLS U-22 initiative program. On 11 May 2024 Kelsy scored his first goal for the club as part of a 2–1 win over the Columbus Crew in the Hell is Real Derby.

=== Portland Timbers ===
On 25 January 2025, Kelsy completed a transfer from Shakhtar Donetsk to the Portland Timbers for a fee reported to be near $6 million. Kelsy signed a four-year contract with a club option for a fifth year.

Additionally, Portland sent $75k in General Allocation Money with performance-related escalators to FC Cincinnati for Kelsy’s MLS rights.

Kelsy made his Timbers debut in a 4–1 loss to the Vancouver Whitecaps on 23 February. He tallied his first goal for Portland in his fifth league appearance for the club, a 3–0 home win against the Colorado Rapids on 22 March.

=== Rangers ===
On 3 September 2026, Kelsy signed for Scottish Premiership club Rangers on a four-year deal with the option of an additional year for a fee of £9 million ($13 million), which could rise with add-ons becoming Rangers second most expensive signing after Tore Andrè Flo in 2000 this was also a club record sale for Portland Timbers with a sell on clause also being reported to be in place. He made his debut two days later in a Scottish Premiership match against Motherwell coming on as a 69th minute substitute for Kim Min-Su with Rangers winning the match 1–0. On 13 September 2026, he scored his first goal for Rangers and got an assist against Old Firm rivals Celtic in a 3–0 victory at Ibrox in a Scottish League Cup quarter-final match. On 10 October 2026, Kelsy scored his first Scottish Premiership goal for Rangers during a 3–1 victory over Kilmarnock at Ibrox. On 24 October 2026, Kelsy scored his first brace for Rangers in a 4–0 league victory over St Johnstone. Four days later he scored in a 2–2 draw away to Hearts to take his tally to four goals in four league appearances.

== International career ==
=== Youth ===
Kelsy was called up to the Venezuela national under-20 football team as part of their 2022 South American Games squad and scored on his debut on the 4th of October 2022 against Uruguay U-20 in a 3–1 loss. He started all three of their group games during the campaign scoring again in their third match against the hosts Paraguay U-20 in a 2–0 victory but Venezuela were eliminated from the competition on goal difference finishing 3rd in Group A behind Paraguay. He was again called up to the squad for the 2023 South American U-20 Championship hosted in Colombia playing in 8 of the 9 games Venezuela were involved in at the tournament but failed to score any goals with the team finishing 5th in the final stages.

Kelsy was called up to Venezuela national under-23 football team as part of their 2024 CONMEBOL Pre-Olympic Tournament squad making his debut on the 20th of January 2024 in a 3–3 draw against Bolivia U-23. Three days later he scored his first goal in a 1–1 draw against Ecuador U-23. Venezuela qualified from the preliminary stages with Kelsy playing 5 games in total at the tournament scoring a 2nd goal in a 2–2 draw against Argentina U-23 during the final stages but Venezuela were eliminated after finishing 4th and did not reach the 2024 Summer Olympics.

=== Senior ===
Kelsy was called up to the Venezuela national football team for the first time for their 2026 FIFA World Cup qualification matches against Argentina and Colombia. On 10 September 2025, he made his senior debut in a 6–3 loss to Colombia at the Estadio Monumental de Maturín coming on as a 63rd minute substitute for Miguel Navarro. On 28 September 2026, he scored his first goal for Venezuela in a 2–1 loss to Japan during a friendly match at the Edion Peace Wing Hiroshima.

== Career statistics ==
=== Club ===
As of match played 28 October 2026

Appearances and goals by club, season and competition
Club	Season	League			National cup (Note: Includes Ukrainian Cup, U.S. Open Cup, Scottish Cup)		League cup (Note: Includes Leagues Cup, Scottish League Cup)		Continental		Other		Total	
Club	Season	Division	Apps	Goals	Apps	Goals	Apps	Goals	Apps	Goals	Apps	Goals	Apps	Goals
Mineros	2021	Liga FUTVE	9	0	—		—		—		—		9	0
Mineros	2022	Liga FUTVE	24	5	—		—		—		—		24	5
Mineros	Total		33	5	—		—		—		—		33	5
Shakhtar Donetsk	2022–23	Ukrainian Premier League	14	5	—		—		3 (Note: Appearances in UEFA Europa League)	1	—		17	6
Shakhtar Donetsk	2023–24	Ukrainian Premier League	13	2	2	0	—		5 (Note: Appearances in UEFA Champions League)	1	—		20	3
Shakhtar Donetsk	Total		27	7	2	0	—		8	2	—		37	9
FC Cincinnati (loan)	2024	Major League Soccer	23	6	—		4	0	—		2 (Note: Appearances in MLS Cup playoffs)	0	29	6
Portland Timbers	2025	Major League Soccer	33	7	1	1	3	1	—		4	0	41	9
Portland Timbers	2026	Major League Soccer	20	9	—		3	1	—		—		23	10
Portland Timbers	Total		53	16	1	1	6	2	—		4	0	64	19
Rangers	2026–27	Scottish Premiership	7	4	0	0	1	1	0	0	—		8	5
Career total			143	38	3	1	11	3	8	2	6	0	171	44

=== International ===
As of match played 28 September 2026

Appearances and goals by national team and year
National team	Year	Apps	Goals
Venezuela	2025	4	0
Venezuela	2026	3	1
Total		7	1

Scores and results list Venezuela's goal tally first.

List of international goals scored by Kevin Kelsy
No.	Date	Venue	Opponent	Score	Result	Competition
1	28 September 2026	Edion Peace Wing Hiroshima, Hiroshima, Japan	Japan	1–0	1–2	Friendly

== Honours ==
Shakhtar Donetsk

- Ukrainian Premier League: 2022–23, 2023–24
- Ukrainian Cup: 2023-24
