= Eric Izoita =

American soccer player (born 2007)

- Izoita with Portland Timbers in 2026

Personal information
- Date of birth: September 8, 2007 (age 19)
- Place of birth: Vancouver, Washington, US
- Position: Midfielder

Team information
- Current team: Portland Timbers
- Number: 73

Youth career
- –2025: Portland Timbers

Senior career*
Years	Team	Apps	(Gls)
2025–2026	Portland Timbers 2	47	(6)
2026	→ Portland Timbers (loan)	1	(1)
2026–	Portland Timbers	8	(0)
- * Club domestic league appearances and goals as of 02:37, November 8, 2026 (UTC)

Eric Izoita (born September 8, 2007) is an American professional soccer player who plays as a midfielder for Major League Soccer club Portland Timbers.

Izoita is a Portland Timbers academy product, and he was named to the MLS Next Pro Best XI for the 2026 season.

== Youth career ==
Izoita joined the academy of the Portland Timbers at age 10, before playing up to the U13s. Following a pause due to the COVID-19 pandemic, Izoita began playing with the U15s. On April 16, 2022, Izoita helped the Portland Timbers academy win the U15 2022 Generation adidas Cup, defeating Valencia 2–0 in the final, which was the first time a Major League Soccer academy team had won the tournament in that age group. In April 2024, Izoita was named U17 Player of the Month in Portland Timber's academy.

== Club career ==
=== Portland Timbers 2 ===
==== 2025: First professional season ====
On March 15, 2025, Izoita started in a 3–2 loss to Real Monarchs, marking his professional debut. On August 9, Izoita made his first professional goal contribution when he provided an assist to Mataeo Bunbury, helping Portland Timbers 2 to a 2–2 draw with Ventura County FC.

==== 2026: Introduction to senior team ====
On February 7, 2026, Izoita made his first appearance with the Portland Timbers senior team, playing in a scoreless draw during a preseason friendly with D.C. United. On March 7, Izoita signed his first professional contract with Portland Timbers 2, and also signed a short-term agreement with the Portland Timbers to make him available for a league match against the Vancouver Whitecaps later that day. Izoita started the match unexpectedly, being informed by Timbers manager Phil Neville hours before kickoff that he would be among the starters. In the 72nd-minute, as the Timbers were down 3–0, Izoita scored from long distance to reduce the deficit, although the Timbers would ultimately lose the game 4–1. Prior to Izoita's goal, the Timbers had only managed one shot on target. With his goal, Izoita became the club's youngest goalscorer in team history at 18 years and 180 days old and also the first Timbers academy player to score on their debut.

Two weeks later, on March 19, Izoita signed with Portland Timbers 2 through the 2026 MLS Next Pro season. However, with his signing, Izoita was slated to also sign with the senior team as a homegrown player in the 2027 season, through the 2027–28 season, with club options for the next two seasons. Three days later, Izoita signed a short-term agreement to make him available for a match against LA Galaxy later that day, however he would be an unused substitute as the teams drew 1–1. On May 30, Izoita scored his first goal for Portland Timbers 2, securing a 1–0 win over Tacoma Defiance. Izoita scored his first professional brace in a 2–1 comeback win over Minnesota United FC 2 on July 31. On August 29, Izoita signed another short-term agreement with the Timbers for a match against Austin FC later that day, but he would again be an unused substitute, this time as the Timbers lost 2–1.

=== Portland Timbers ===
Izoita signed with the Timbers as a homegrown player, ahead of schedule, on September 25 through the 2027–28 season with team options for the following two seasons. In the following match a day later, Izoita assisted David Da Costa in a 3–1 loss at the San Jose Earthquakes. On October 8, Izoita was named to the MLS Next Pro Best XI for the 2026 season. Izoita assisted Ariel Lassiter twice in a 3–2 win over Charlotte FC on October 24, and as a result of his performance he was named to the bench of the Team of the Matchday.

== Career statistics ==
As of match played November 21, 2026

Appearances and goals by club, season, and competition
Club	Season	League			U.S. Open Cup		Continental		Playoffs		Other		Total	
Club	Season	Division	Apps	Goals	Apps	Goals	Apps	Goals	Apps	Goals	Apps	Goals	Apps	Goals
Portland Timbers 2	2025	MLS Next Pro	21	0	—		—		—		—		21	0
Portland Timbers 2	2026	MLS Next Pro	26	6	—		—		—		—		26	6
Portland Timbers 2	Total		47	6	0	0	0	0	0	0	0	0	47	6
Portland Timbers (loan)	2026	Major League Soccer	1	1	—		—		—		—		1	1
Portland Timbers	2026	Major League Soccer	8	0	—		—		1	0	—		9	0
Portland Timbers	Portland Timbers total		9	1	0	0	0	0	1	0	0	0	10	1
Career total			56	7	0	0	0	0	1	0	0	0	57	7

== Honors ==
Individual

- MLS Next Pro Best XI: 2026
