= Sebastian Berhalter =

American soccer player (born 2001)

- Berhalter with the United States in 2026

Personal information
- Full name: Sebastian Matthew Berhalter
- Date of birth: May 10, 2001 (age 25)
- Place of birth: London, England
- Height: 5 ft 9 in (1.75 m)
- Position: Midfielder

Team information
- Current team: Middlesbrough
- Number: 6

Youth career
- 2012–2013: Hammarby IF
- 2014–2019: Columbus Crew

College career
Years	Team	Apps	(Gls)
2019	North Carolina Tar Heels	16	(0)

Senior career*
Years	Team	Apps	(Gls)
2020–2021	Columbus Crew	9	(0)
2021	→ Austin FC (loan)	18	(0)
2022–2026	Vancouver Whitecaps	120	(14)
2022	→ Whitecaps 2 (loan)	1	(0)
2026–	Middlesbrough	15	(3)

International career^{‡}
2025–	United States	24	(4)
Medal record
Representing United States
Men's football
CONCACAF Gold Cup
Runner-up	2025 Canada–United States
- * Club domestic league appearances and goals as of November 7, 2026 ‡ National team caps and goals as of 01:59, November 18, 2026 (UTC)

Sebastian Matthew Berhalter (born May 10, 2001) is an American professional soccer player who plays as a midfielder for EFL Championship club Middlesbrough and the United States national team.

Berhalter has played in the academies of Hammarby IF and Columbus Crew, as well as played college soccer for the North Carolina Tar Heels. Berhalter began his professional career with the Columbus Crew in 2020, but moved to Austin FC on loan for the 2021 season. After Austin FC declined their option to sign him, he returned to Columbus, but was traded to the Vancouver Whitecaps in early 2022. With the Vancouver Whitecaps, Berhalter eventually solidified himself as a regular player for the team, and was selected to the MLS Best XI in 2025 and the MLS All-Stars in 2025 and 2026. In July 2026, Berhalter joined EFL Championship club Middlesbrough.

Berhalter did not make any appearances with the youth teams of the United States, but received his first call-up to the senior national team in 2025. With the national team, Berhalter has finished runner-up in the 2025 CONCACAF Gold Cup and was selected to the 2026 FIFA World Cup squad.

== Early life and college ==
Berhalter was born in London, England, to Rosalind and Gregg Berhalter, former coach of the United States men's national soccer team, who at the time was a professional soccer player for Crystal Palace. Berhalter was raised in Columbus, Ohio. Between 2012 and 2013, he played youth football with Swedish club Hammarby IF when his father managed their senior team.

He joined the Columbus Crew Academy in 2014, climbing the ranks and making 103 appearances and scoring 11 goals. In 2019, Berhalter played college soccer for the Tar Heels of the University of North Carolina, playing in 16 matches.

== Club career ==
=== Columbus Crew ===
Berhalter was announced as a homegrown player signing by the Columbus Crew of Major League Soccer on January 17, 2020. He made his professional debut on July 11, 2020, against FC Cincinnati during the MLS is Back Tournament in Orlando, Florida. Berhalter made nine appearances for the Crew during the 2020 season, which ended in their MLS Cup victory.

==== Austin FC (loan) ====
On March 3, 2021, Berhalter joined Major League Soccer club Austin FC on loan for the 2021 season. He made his debut for the club on April 24 against the Colorado Rapids, coming on as a substitute in the 3–1 away victory. Following the 2021 season, Berhalter's contract option was declined by Austin and he returned to Columbus.

=== Vancouver Whitecaps ===
On February 4, 2022, Berhalter was traded to Vancouver Whitecaps in exchange for $50,000 in general allocation money and an additional $50,000 should certain conditions be met.

In the 2023 season, Berhalter made 37 appearances for the Whitecaps and scored two goals across all competitions. The following season, he made 45 appearances, recorded six assists, and scored three goals across all competitions. In 2025, Berhalter played 33 matches, scored four goals, and led the Whitecaps with 12 assists during the season. He also appeared in the 2025 MLS All-Star Game against the LIGA MX All-Stars on July 23, 2025, a match MLS won 3–1.

=== Middlesbrough ===
On July 28, 2026, Berhalter joined EFL Championship club Middlesbrough for an undisclosed fee on a four-year deal. On August 7, Berhalter made his debut for Middlesbrough in an EFL Cup tie against Wrexham. During the match, Berhalter provided an assist to Will Lankshear, helping to win the game 1–0. Berhalter scored his first goals for the club when he scored twice in a 4–3 win over Norwich City on September 12.

== International career ==
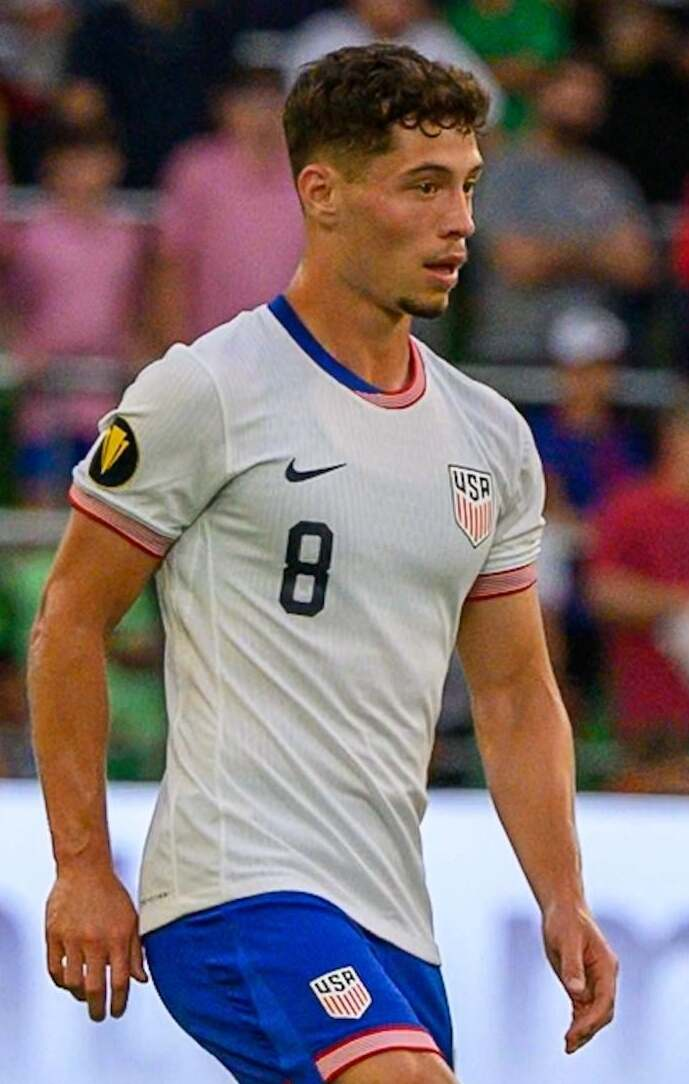
Berhalter with the United States at the 2025 CONCACAF Gold Cup

On May 22, 2025, Berhalter was called up by United States national team coach Mauricio Pochettino for training camp in Chicago ahead of matches against Turkey and Switzerland. He made his debut in the 2025 CONCACAF Gold Cup. He scored his first goal for the national team during the United States' 5–1 defeat of Uruguay at Raymond James Stadium in Tampa, Florida.

On May 26, 2026, Berhalter was selected in the 26-man squad for the 2026 FIFA World Cup. On June 25, Berhalter assisted and scored in a 3–2 loss against Turkey during the last group stage match.

== Personal life ==
He is the son of current Chicago Fire FC and former United States national team head coach Gregg Berhalter and former University of North Carolina Tar Heels player Rosalind "Roz" Berhalter, who won four national championships. He is of Puerto Rican descent through his mother.

== Career statistics ==
=== Club ===
As of match played November 7, 2026

Appearances and goals by club, season and competition
Club	Season	League			National cup (Note: Includes Canadian Championship, FA Cup)		League cup (Note: Includes EFL Cup)		Continental		Other		Total	
Club	Season	Division	Apps	Goals	Apps	Goals	Apps	Goals	Apps	Goals	Apps	Goals	Apps	Goals
Columbus Crew	2020	MLS	9	0	―		―		―		―		9	0
Austin FC (loan)	2021	MLS	18	0	―		―		―		―		18	0
Vancouver Whitecaps FC	2022	MLS	18	0	―		―		―		2 (Note: Appearances in MLS Cup playoffs)	0	20	0
Vancouver Whitecaps FC	2023	MLS	28	2	2	0	―		4 (Note: Appearances in CONCACAF Champions League/Cup)	0	3 (Note: Two appearances in Leagues Cup, one appearance in MLS Cup playoffs)	0	37	2
Vancouver Whitecaps FC	2024	MLS	31	2	5	0	―		2	0	7 (Note: Three appearances and one goal in Leagues Cup, four appearances in MLS Cup playoffs)	1	45	3
Vancouver Whitecaps FC	2025	MLS	29	4	5	1	―		8	3	5	0	47	8
Vancouver Whitecaps FC	2026	MLS	14	6	0	0	―		4	1	0	0	18	7
Vancouver Whitecaps FC	Total		120	14	14	1	―		18	4	15	1	167	20
Whitecaps FC 2 (loan)	2022	MLS Next Pro	1	0	―		―		―		―		1	0
Middlesbrough	2026–27	Championship	15	3	0	0	2	0	―		―		17	3
Career total			163	17	14	1	2	0	18	4	15	1	212	23

=== International ===
As of match played November 17, 2026

Appearances and goals by national team and year
National team	Year	Apps	Goals
United States	2025	9	1
United States	2026	15	3
Total		24	4

Scores and results list United States goal tally first.

List of international goals scored by Sebastian Berhalter
No.	Date	Venue	Cap	Opponent	Score	Result	Competition
1	November 18, 2025	Raymond James Stadium, Tampa, United States	9	Uruguay	1–0	5–1	Friendly
2	June 25, 2026	SoFi Stadium, Inglewood, United States	16	Turkey	2–2	2–3	2026 FIFA World Cup
3	September 26, 2026	Inter.co Stadium, Orlando, United States	19	Peru	4–1	4–1	Friendly
4	September 29, 2026	Energizer Park, St. Louis, United States	20	Chile	1–0	4–2	Friendly

== Honors ==
Columbus Crew

- MLS Cup: 2020

Vancouver Whitecaps FC

- Canadian Championship: 2022, 2023, 2024, 2025

Individual

- MLS Best XI: 2025
- MLS All-Star: 2025, 2026
