= 2023 Vancouver Whitecaps FC season =

Vancouver Whitecaps FC 2023 soccer season

Vancouver Whitecaps FC
- Chairman: Jeff Mallett
- Head coach: Vanni Sartini
- Stadium: BC Place (Vancouver, BC)
- Major League Soccer: Conference: 6th; Overall: 13th
- MLS Cup playoffs: Round one
- Canadian Championship: Winners
- CONCACAF Champions League: Quarter-finals
- Leagues Cup: Round of 32
- Top goalscorer: League: Brian White (15); All: Brian White (16)
- Highest home attendance: League/All: 30,204; November 5 vs. Los Angeles FC
- Lowest home attendance: League/All: 11,652; April 5 vs. LAFC
- Average home league attendance: 16,745
- Biggest win: VAN 5–0 RES CCL (3/08); VAN 5–0 MTL MLS (4/01)
- Biggest defeat: VAN 0–3 LAFC; CCL (4/05); LAFC 3–0 VAN; CCL (4/11)
Home colours	Away colours

The 2023 Vancouver Whitecaps FC season was the club's thirteenth season in Major League Soccer, the top division of soccer in the United States and Canada. Including previous iterations of the franchise, this was the 46th season of professional soccer being played in Vancouver under a variation of the "Whitecaps" name.

Having won the 2022 Canadian Championship, the Whitecaps participated in the CONCACAF Champions League for the first time since the 2016–17 edition and third time overall.

== Roster ==
As of September 15, 2023

No.	Player	Nationality	Position	Date of birth (age)	Previous club
Goalkeepers
1	Thomas Hasal	(Canada)	GK	July 2, 1999 (age 27)	(Canada) Vancouver Whitecaps FC U-23
18	Yohei Takaoka	(Japan)	GK	March 16, 1996 (age 30)	(Japan) Yokohama F. Marinos
50	Max Anchor	(Canada)	GK	July 21, 2004 (age 22)	(Canada) Whitecaps FC 2
60	Isaac Boehmer	(Canada)	GK	November 20, 2001 (age 24)	(Canada) Vancouver Whitecaps Development Squad
Defenders
2	Mathías Laborda	(Uruguay)	DF	September 15, 1999 (age 27)	(Uruguay) Nacional
3	Sam Adekugbe	(Canada)	DF	January 16, 1995 (age 31)	(Turkey) Hatayspor
4	Ranko Veselinović	(Serbia)	DF	March 24, 1999 (age 27)	(Serbia) Vojvodina
6	Tristan Blackmon	(United States)	DF	August 12, 1996 (age 30)	(United States) Charlotte FC
7	Richie Laryea	(Canada)	DF	January 7, 1995 (age 31)	(England) Nottingham Forest
12	Karifa Yao	(Canada)	DF	September 28, 2000 (age 26)	(Canada) CF Montréal
14	Luís Martins	(Portugal)	DF	June 10, 1992 (age 34)	(United States) Sporting Kansas City
23	Javain Brown	(Jamaica)	DF	March 19, 1999 (age 27)	(United States) South Florida Bulls
61	Matteo Campagna	(Canada)	DF	June 27, 2004 (age 22)	(Canada) Vancouver Whitecaps FC U-23
Midfielders
8	Alessandro Schöpf	(Austria)	MF	February 7, 1994 (age 32)	(Germany) Arminia Bielefeld
16	Sebastian Berhalter	(United States)	MF	May 10, 2001 (age 25)	(United States) Columbus Crew
20	Andrés Cubas	(Paraguay)	MF	May 22, 1996 (age 30)	(France) Nîmes
22	Ali Ahmed	(Canada)	MF	October 10, 2000 (age 26)	(Canada) Whitecaps FC 2
25	Ryan Gauld	(Scotland)	MF	December 16, 1995 (age 30)	(Portugal) Farense
26	J.C. Ngando	(Cameroon)	MF	November 20, 1999 (age 26)	(United States) UNC Greensboro Spartans
27	Ryan Raposo	(Canada)	MF	March 5, 1999 (age 27)	(United States) Syracuse Orange
30	Kamron Habibullah	(Canada)	MF	October 3, 2003 (age 23)	(Canada) Vancouver Whitecaps FC U-23
31	Russell Teibert	(Canada)	MF	December 22, 1992 (age 33)	(Canada) Vancouver Whitecaps (USSF-D2)
45	Pedro Vite	(Ecuador)	MF	March 9, 2002 (age 24)	(Ecuador) Independiente del Valle
Forwards
11	Junior Hoilett	(Canada)	FW	June 5, 1990 (age 36)	(England) Reading
24	Brian White	(United States)	FW	February 3, 1996 (age 30)	(United States) New York Red Bulls
28	Levonte Johnson	(Canada)	FW	March 15, 1999 (age 27)	(Canada) Whitecaps FC 2
29	Simon Becher	(United States)	FW	July 20, 1999 (age 27)	(Canada) Whitecaps FC 2
Out on Loan
7	Déiber Caicedo	(Colombia)	FW	March 25, 2000 (age 26)	(Colombia) Deportivo Cali
8	Caio Alexandre	(Brazil)	MF	February 24, 1999 (age 27)	(Brazil) Botafogo

== Transfers ==
=== In ===
==== Transferred in ====
#	Position	Player	Transferred from	Fee/notes	Date	Source
22	MF	(Canada) Ali Ahmed	(Canada) Whitecaps FC 2	Free	November 16, 2022	
12	DF	(Canada) Karifa Yao	(Canada) CF Montréal	Re-Entry Draft Stage One	November 17, 2022	
29	FW	(United States) Simon Becher	(Canada) Whitecaps FC 2	Free	November 17, 2022	
26	MF	(Cameroon) J.C. Ngando	(United States) UNC Greensboro Spartans	2023 MLS SuperDraft/Generation Adidas	December 21, 2022	
50	GK	(Canada) Max Anchor	(Canada) Whitecaps FC 2	Homegrown player	January 1, 2023	
2	DF	(Uruguay) Mathías Laborda	(Uruguay) Nacional	Free	January 9, 2023	
18	GK	(Japan) Yohei Takaoka	(Japan) Yokohama F. Marinos	Undisclosed	February 17, 2023	
9	FW	(Venezuela) Sergio Córdova	(Germany) FC Augsburg	Undisclosed/Designated Player	February 20, 2023	
28	FW	(Canada) Levonte Johnson	(Canada) Whitecaps FC 2	Free	June 30, 2023	
3	DF	(Canada) Sam Adekugbe	(Turkey) Hatayspor	Undisclosed	August 2, 2023	
11	FW	(Canada) Junior Hoilett	(England) Reading	Free	September 14, 2023	

==== Loans in ====
#	Position	Player	Loaned from	Date	Loan expires	Notes	Source
7	DF	(Canada) Richie Laryea	(England) Nottingham Forest	August 2, 2023	December 31, 2023		

=== Out ===
==== Transferred out ====
#	Position	Player	Transferred to	Fee/notes	Date	Source
12	GK	(United States) Evan Newton	Retired	Option declined	October 18, 2022	
15	MF	(Guinea-Bissau) Janio Bikel	(Russia) FC Khimki	Option declined	October 18, 2022	
18	FW	(Nigeria) David Egbo		Option declined	October 18, 2022	
33	MF	(Canada) Michael Baldisimo	(United States) San Jose Earthquakes	Out of contract	October 18, 2022	
2	DF	(Canada) Marcus Godinho	(Poland) Korona Kielce	Option declined	November 14, 2022	
9	FW	(Canada) Lucas Cavallini	(Mexico) Club Tijuana	Option declined	November 14, 2022	
17	MF	(Ghana) Leonard Owusu	(Norway) Odd	Option declined	November 14, 2022	
26	DF	(Germany) Florian Jungwirth	Retired	Out of contract, retired	November 14, 2022	
28	DF	(United States) Jake Nerwinski	(United States) St. Louis City SC	Option declined	November 14, 2022	
55	GK	(United States) Cody Cropper	(United States) Orange County SC	Option declined	November 14, 2022	
87	FW	(Canada) Tosaint Ricketts	Retired	Option declined	November 14, 2022	
13	DF	(Canada) Derek Cornelius	(Sweden) Malmö FF	Undisclosed	December 15, 2022	
3	DF	(Canada) Cristián Gutiérrez	(Canada) Toronto FC	Claimed off Waivers	December 15, 2022	
11	FW	(Colombia) Cristian Dájome	(United States) D.C. United	$350,000 GAM + $200,000 conditional GAM	April 25, 2023	
19	MF	(United States) Julian Gressel	(United States) Columbus Crew	$550,000 GAM + $300,000 conditional GAM	July 21, 2023	
9	FW	(Venezuela) Sergio Córdova	(Turkey) Alanyaspor	Undisclosed	September 15, 2023	

==== Loans out ====
#	Position	Player	Loaned to	Date	Loan expires	Source
8	MF	(Brazil) Caio Alexandre	(Brazil) Fortaleza	December 28, 2022	December 31, 2023	
7	FW	(Colombia) Déiber Caicedo	(Colombia) Junior FC	August 3, 2023	July 31, 2024	

=== MLS SuperDraft picks ===
Round	No.	Pos.	Player	College/Club team	Transaction	Source
1(5)		MF	(Cameroon) J.C. Ngando	(United States) UNC Greensboro	Signed to a Generation Adidas deal	
1(29)		FW	(Canada) Levonte Johnson	(United States) Syracuse	Signed with Whitecaps FC 2	
2(42)		DF	(Canada) (England) Daniel Nimick	(United States) Western Michigan	Signed with HFX Wanderers	
3(71)		DF	(Sweden) Buster Sjöberg	(United States) Syracuse		

== Preseason ==
January 18 Training camp	Whitecaps FC	0–2	Hamburger SV	Marbella, Spain
6:00 AM (PST)		Report	Glatzel 4', 60'	Stadium: Estadio Municipal de Marbella

January 21 Training camp	Whitecaps FC	1–2	Wolfsberger AC	Marbella, Spain
7:00 AM (PST)	Dájome 23'; Yao (yellow card) 77'	Report	Scherzer (yellow card) 24'; Baribo 56'; Leitgeb 77'	Stadium: Estadio Municipal de Marbella

February 1 Coachella Valley Inv.	Whitecaps FC	1–1	D.C. United	Indio, California
1:00 PM (PST)	Rocha 29'	Report	Laborda 37'	Stadium: Empire Polo Club

February 4 Coachella Valley Inv.	Whitecaps FC	1–1	Charlotte FC	Indio, California
11:00 AM (PST)	Dájome (yellow card) 23'; Cubas (yellow card) 51'; Becher 85'; Yao (yellow card) 106'	Report	Bronico (yellow card) 29' (yellow-red card) 60'; Vargas 66'; Lindsey (yellow card) 125'	Stadium: Empire Polo Club

February 8 Coachella Valley Inv.	Toronto FC	0–3	Whitecaps FC	Indio, California
1:00 PM (PST)	Bernardeschi (penalty missed) 40'; O'Neill (yellow card) 61'	Report	Cubas (yellow card) 34'; Dájome 67' (pen.), 77'; Brown 75'	Stadium: Empire Polo Club

February 12 Coachella Valley Inv.	St. Louis City SC	0–0	Whitecaps FC	Indio, California
12:30 PM (PST)	Parker (yellow card) 29'; Gioacchini (yellow card) 90+1'	Report	Becher (yellow card) 32'	Stadium: Empire Polo Club

February 12 Coachella Valley Inv.	Las Vegas Lights	1–2	Whitecaps FC	Indio, California
3:30 PM (PST)	(yellow card) 32'; Stauffer 42'	Report	Vite 33'; Raposo (yellow card) 48'; Dájome 77'	Stadium: Empire Polo Club

February 18 Coachella Valley Inv.	Minnesota United FC	0–2	Whitecaps FC	Indio, California
10:00 AM (PST)	Tapias (yellow card) 62'	Report	Dájome (yellow card) 64'; Gressel 71'; Gauld 88'	Stadium: Empire Polo Club

== Competition overview ==
Competition	First match	Last match	Starting round	Final position	Record							
Competition	First match	Last match	Starting round	Final position	Pld	W	D	L	GF	GA	GD	Win %
Major League Soccer	February 25	November 5	Matchday 1	Playoffs - Round One	36	12	12	12	57	54	+3	33.33
Canadian Championship	May 10	June 7	Quarter-finals	Winners	3	3	0	0	9	2	+7	100.00
CONCACAF Champions League	March 8	April 11	Round of 16	Quarter-finals	4	1	0	3	7	9	−2	25.00
Leagues Cup	July 21	August 4	Group Stage	Round of 32	3	1	2	0	5	4	+1	33.33
Total					46	17	14	15	78	69	+9	36.96

Last updated: 5 November 2023
Source: Competitions

== Major League Soccer ==
=== Regular season ===
==== League tables ====
===== Western Conference =====
MLS Western Conference table (2023)
Pos	Team	Pld	W	L	T	GF	GA	GD	Pts	Qualification
4	Houston Dynamo FC	34	14	11	9	51	38	+13	51	Qualification for round one
5	Real Salt Lake	34	14	12	8	48	50	−2	50	Qualification for round one
6	Vancouver Whitecaps FC	34	12	10	12	55	48	+7	48	Qualification for round one
7	FC Dallas	34	11	10	13	41	37	+4	46	Qualification for round one
8	Sporting Kansas City	34	12	14	8	48	51	−3	44	Qualification for the wild card round

Source: MLS
Rules for classification: 1) points; 2) total wins; 3) total goal differential; 4) total goals scored; 5) fewer disciplinary points; 6) away goal differential; 7) away goals scored; 8) home goals differential; 9) home goals scored; 10) coin toss (2 clubs tied) or drawing of lots (≥3 clubs tied)

===== Overall =====
Overall MLS standings table
Pos	Team	Pld	W	L	T	GF	GA	GD	Pts	Qualification
11	Real Salt Lake	34	14	12	8	48	50	−2	50	Qualification for the U.S. Open Cup round of 32 (Note: As one of the top seven teams in the overall table to not qualify for the 2024 CONCACAF Champions Cup)
12	Nashville SC	34	13	11	10	39	32	+7	49	Qualification for the CONCACAF Champions Cup round one (Note: As 2023 Leagues Cup runners-up)
13	Vancouver Whitecaps FC (V)	34	12	10	12	55	48	+7	48	Qualification for the CONCACAF Champions Cup round one (Note: As 2023 Canadian Championship winners)
14	FC Dallas	34	11	10	13	41	37	+4	46	Qualification for the U.S. Open Cup round of 32
15	Sporting Kansas City	34	12	14	8	48	51	−3	44	Qualification for the U.S. Open Cup round of 32

Source: MLS
Rules for classification: 1) points; 2) total wins; 3) total goal differential; 4) total goals scored; 5) fewer disciplinary points; 6) away goal differential; 7) away goals scored; 8) home goals differential; 9) home goals scored; 10) coin toss (2 clubs tied) or drawing of lots (≥3 clubs tied)
(V) Canadian Championship winner

==== Results ====
Overall								Home						Away					
Pld	Pts	W	L	T	GF	GA	GD	W	L	T	GF	GA	GD	W	L	T	GF	GA	GD
34	48	12	10	12	55	48	+7	8	3	6	35	19	+16	4	7	6	20	29	−9

Last updated: October 21, 2023
Pld = Matches played; Pts = Points; W = Matches won; T = Matches tied; L = Matches lost; GF = Goals for; GA = Goals against; GD = Goal difference

Round	1	2	3	4	5	6	7	8	9	10	11	12	13	14	15	16	17	18	19	20	21	22	23	24	25	26	27	28	29	30	31	32	33	34
Ground	H	A	H	A	A	H	H	A	H	H	A	A	H	A	H	H	H	A	A	A	H	H	H	H	A	A	A	A	A	A	H	H	A	H
Result	L	L	D	D	D	W	W	D	D	W	L	L	W	L	W	D	D	D	W	L	L	W	W	L	W	W	D	W	L	L	D	W	D	D
Position (West)	11	12	11	11	11	9	8	8	9	7	8	7	7	8	6	6	6	6	9	9	9	9	8	8	7	5	6	4	5	5	6	5	5	6

Updated to match(es) played on October 7, 2023. Source:
A = Away; H = Home; N = Neutral; W = Win; D = Draw; L = Loss

==== Matches ====
February 25 1	Whitecaps FC	1–2	Real Salt Lake	Vancouver, British Columbia
7:30pm PST	Brown 24'	Report	Löffelsend (yellow card) 15'; Glad 70'; Kreilach 73'	Stadium: BC Place; Attendance: 19,614; Referee: Ismir Pekmic

March 4 2	San Jose Earthquakes	2–1	Whitecaps FC	San Jose, California
7:30pm PST	Yueill (yellow card) 58'; Ebobisse 68'; Akapo 77'; Espinoza (yellow card) 83'	Report	Schöpf 17', (yellow card) 69'; Veselinović (yellow card) 36'; Cubas (yellow card) 41'; Martins (yellow card) 68'	Stadium: PayPal Park; Attendance: 18,000; Referee: Mark Allatin

March 11 3	Whitecaps FC	1–1	FC Dallas	Vancouver, British Columbia
2:00pm PST	Arriola 34' (o.g.); Cubas (yellow card) 42'; Schöpf (yellow card) 75'	Report	Ibeagha 5'; Tafari (yellow card) 69'; Obrian (yellow card) 88'	Stadium: BC Place; Attendance: 16,780; Referee: Marcos de Oliveira

March 18 4	LA Galaxy	1–1	Whitecaps FC	Carson, California
7:30pm PDT	Leerdam 45+4'; Edwards (yellow card) 90+3'	Report	Blackmon 14'; Veselinović (yellow card) 17'; Brown (yellow card) 43'; Raposo (yellow card) 71'; Laborda (yellow card) 87'	Stadium: Dignity Health Sports Park; Attendance: 23,112; Referee: Victor Rivas

March 25 5	Minnesota United FC	1–1	Whitecaps FC	Saint Paul, Minnesota
5:30pm CDT	García 40'; Trapp (yellow card) 58'; Heath (yellow card) 64'; Tapias (yellow card) 76'; Bello (yellow card) 90+2'; Amarilla (yellow card) 90+2'	Report	Blackmon (yellow card) 54'; Ahmed (yellow card) 73'; White (yellow card) 89'; Becher 90+8'	Stadium: Allianz Field; Attendance: 19,609; Referee: Rosendo Mendoza

April 1 6	Whitecaps FC	5–0	CF Montréal	Vancouver, British Columbia
7:30pm PDT	White 38'; Becher 43', 59'; Gressel 45'; Ahmed 48'; Laborda (yellow card) 50'	Report	Camacho (yellow card) 11' (red card) 23'; Waterman (yellow card) 18'; Rea (yellow card) 52'	Stadium: BC Place; Attendance: 16,046; Referee: Timothy Ford

April 8 7 Cascadia Cup	Whitecaps FC	1–0	Portland Timbers	Vancouver, British Columbia
7:30pm PDT	Blackmon (yellow card) 39'; White 74', (yellow card) 90'; Sartini (yellow card) 90+2'; Berhalter (yellow card) 90+3'	Report	Župarić (yellow card) 48'; Moreno (yellow card) 53'; Ayala (yellow card) 90'	Stadium: BC Place; Attendance: 17,029; Referee: Nima Saghafi

April 15 8	Austin FC	0–0	Whitecaps FC	Austin, Texas
7:30pm CDT	Driussi (yellow card) 40'; Lima (yellow card) 68'	Report	White (yellow card) 42'; Cubas (yellow card) 45'	Stadium: Q2 Stadium; Attendance: 20,738; Referee: Mark Allatin

April 29 9	Whitecaps FC	0–0	Colorado Rapids	Vancouver, British Columbia
7:30pm PDT	Gauld (yellow card) 28'	Report		Stadium: BC Place; Attendance: 14,103; Referee: Tori Penso

May 6 10	Whitecaps FC	3–2	Minnesota United FC	Vancouver, British Columbia
7:30pm PDT	White 17', 52'; Becher 56'	Report	Boxall 33'; Jeong Sang-bin 65'	Stadium: BC Place; Attendance: 14,047; Referee: Filip Dujic

May 13 11 Cascadia Cup	Portland Timbers	3–1	Whitecaps FC	Portland, Oregon
7:30pm PDT	Boli 2'; Evander 18', 54'; McGraw (yellow card) 73'	Report	McGraw 24' (o.g.); Brown (yellow card) 74'	Stadium: Providence Park; Attendance: 23,154; Referee: Guido Gonzales Jr.

May 17 12	FC Dallas	2–1	Whitecaps FC	Frisco, Texas
5:30pm	Ferreira 37', 54'; Cerrillo (yellow card) 75'	Report	Vite 23'; Laborda (yellow card) 35'	Stadium: Toyota Stadium; Attendance: 15,890; Referee: Jon Freemon

May 20 13 Cascadia Cup	Whitecaps FC	2–0	Seattle Sounders FC	Vancouver, British Columbia
7:30pm	Vite (yellow card) 10', (goal) 44'; Ahmed (yellow card) 34'; Frei 58' (o.g.); Córdova (yellow card) 90+3'	Report	Chú (yellow card) 41'; Rusnák (yellow card) 49'; Atencio (yellow card) 70'	Stadium: BC Place; Attendance: 19,108; Referee: Joseph Dickerson

May 27 14	St. Louis City SC	3–1	Whitecaps FC	St. Louis, Missouri
5:30pm	Löwen 10'; Nerwinski (yellow card) 20'; Parker (yellow card) 23'; Blackmon 45' (o.g.); Stroud (yellow card) 60'; Blom (yellow card) 86'; Perez 90+4'	Report	Berhalter (yellow card) 49'; White 83'; Gressel (yellow card) 90+3'; Gauld (yellow card) 90+4'	Stadium: Citypark; Attendance: 22,423; Referee: Sergii Boiko

May 31 15	Whitecaps FC	6–2	Houston Dynamo FC	Vancouver, British Columbia
7:30pm	Vite 1'; Gressel 18', 59', (yellow card) 41'; White 46'; Laborda (yellow card) 70'; Córdova (yellow card) 79'; Berhalter 88'; Gauld 90+5'	Report	Baird 8'; Bassi 16'; Quiñónes (red card) 69'; Carrasquilla (yellow card) 69'; Clark (yellow card) 84'	Stadium: BC Place; Attendance: 13,232; Referee: Mark Allatin

June 3 16	Whitecaps FC	1–1	Sporting Kansas City	Vancouver, British Columbia
7:30pm	White (yellow card) 39'; Blackmon (yellow card) 63'; Cubas (yellow card) 69'; Gauld (yellow card) 78', (goal) 88' (pen.)	Report	Castellanos (yellow card) 7'; Pulido 20'; Kinda (yellow card) 79'; McIntosh (yellow card) 90+5'	Stadium: BC Place; Attendance: 13,739; Referee: Lukasz Szpala
Note: Whitecaps FC manager Vanni Sartini was cautioned (yellow card) in the 86th minute for dissent.

June 10 17	Whitecaps FC	1–1	FC Cincinnati	Vancouver, British Columbia
7:30pm	Raposo (yellow card) 60'; Gauld 89' (pen.); Vite (yellow card) 90+2'	Report	Murphy (yellow card) 29'; Mosquera (yellow card) 77'; Acosta 83'	Stadium: BC Place; Attendance: 16,086; Referee: Ismir Pekmic

June 24 19	Los Angeles FC	2–3	Whitecaps FC	Los Angeles, California
6:30pm	Crisostomo (yellow card) 25'; Bouanga 45'; Vela 68'; Hollingshead (yellow card) 86'	Report	Veselinović 2'; White 23'; Raposo (yellow card) 32'; Gauld 63'; Vite (yellow card) 85'; Martins (yellow card) 90+1'	Stadium: BMO Stadium; Attendance: 22,133; Referee: Jon Freemon

July 1 20	Sporting Kansas City	3–0	Whitecaps FC	Kansas City, Kansas
5:30pm	Walter 33'; Pulido 45+2'; Thommy 53', (yellow card) 57'; Davis (yellow card) 89'	Report	Berhalter (yellow card) 66'	Stadium: Children's Mercy Park; Attendance: 18,867; Referee: Malik Badawi

July 8 21 Cascadia Cup	Whitecaps FC	2–3	Seattle Sounders FC	Vancouver, British Columbia
7:30pm	Veselinović 24'; Gauld 72'; Blackmon (yellow card) 75'; Laborda (yellow card) 82' (yellow-red card) 89'	Report	Ruidíaz (yellow card) 48'; Léo Chú 60', 76'; Lodeiro (yellow card) 79'; Yeimar 90+1'	Stadium: BC Place; Attendance: 16,399; Referee: Ramy Touchan

July 12 22	Whitecaps FC	2–1	Austin FC	Vancouver, British Columbia
7:30pm	Vite 1'; Córdova 72'; Cubas (yellow card) 87'; Blackmon (yellow card) 90+10'	Report	Redes 47', (yellow card) 52'; Lundkvist (yellow card) 78'	Stadium: BC Place; Attendance: 14,995; Referee: Nima Saghafi

July 15 23	Whitecaps FC	4–2	LA Galaxy	Vancouver, British Columbia
7:30pm	White 2'; Gauld 10', 23' (pen.); Schöpf (yellow card) 48'; Córdova 90+4'	Report	Mavinga (yellow card) 9' (yellow-red card) 21'; Puig (yellow card) 23'; Brugman 61'; Delgado 74'	Stadium: BC Place; Attendance: 18,354; Referee: Joseph Dickerson

August 20 24	Whitecaps FC	0–1	San Jose Earthquakes	Vancouver, British Columbia
7:30pm	Gauld (yellow card) 90'	Report	Monteiro (yellow card) 39'; Espinoza 43'; Gruezo (yellow card) 62'; Tsakiris (yellow card) 79'; Daniel (yellow card) 82'; Marie (yellow card) 89'; Rodrigues (yellow card) 90'	Stadium: BC Place; Attendance: 16,765; Referee: Ismir Pekmic

August 26 25 Cascadia Cup	Portland Timbers	2–3	Whitecaps FC	Portland, Oregon
7:30pm	Evander (yellow card) 34', (goal) 85'; Župarić (yellow card) 51'; Mora 53'; Asprilla (yellow card) 63'; Boli (yellow card) 90+5'	Report	Gauld 13', 60' (pen.); White 36'; Cubas (yellow card) 65'; Laryea (yellow card) 90+5'	Stadium: Providence Park; Attendance: 22,674; Referee: Rosendo Mendoza

August 30 26	Chicago Fire FC	0–1	Whitecaps FC	Chicago, Illinois
5:30pm		Report	White 19'; Brown (yellow card) 58'	Stadium: Soldier Field; Attendance: 9,187; Referee: Ricardo Fierro

September 2 27	New York City FC	1–1	Whitecaps FC	New York, New York
12:30pm	Perea (yellow card) 20'; Rodríguez (yellow card) 37'; Bakrar 55'; Sands (yellow card) 57'	Report	Laborda (yellow card) 28'; Gauld 60' (pen.); Berhalter (yellow card) 90+1'	Stadium: Yankee Stadium; Attendance: 17,942; Referee: Pierre-Luc Lauziere

September 16 28	Toronto FC	1–2	Whitecaps FC	Toronto, Ontario
4:30pm	Kerr 50'; Petretta (yellow card) 76'	Report	Berhalter (yellow card) 32'; Blackmon 56'; Vite (yellow card) 60'; White 66'; Brown (yellow card) 87'	Stadium: BMO Field; Attendance: 26,165; Referee: Ramy Touchan

September 20 29	Houston Dynamo FC	4–1	Whitecaps FC	Houston, Texas
5:30pm	Herrera 13'; Kowalczyk (yellow card) 30'; Sviatchenko (yellow card) 36'; Dorsey 44', (yellow card) 52'; Baird (yellow card) 49'; Micael (yellow card) 60'; Franco 73'; Ibrahim 84'	Report	Raposo (yellow card) 2'; Perea (yellow card) 24'; Sviatchenko 90' (o.g.)	Stadium: Shell Energy Stadium; Attendance: 13,866; Referee: Fotis Bazakos

September 23 30	Real Salt Lake	2–1	Whitecaps FC	Sandy, Utah
6:30pm	Vera 47', (yellow card) 90+4'; Glad 65'; Brody (yellow card) 74'; Palacio (yellow card) 82'	Report	White 17'; Adekugbe (yellow card) 90+11'	Stadium: America First Field; Attendance: 19,243; Referee: Malik Badawi

September 27 18	Colorado Rapids	2–2	Whitecaps FC	Commerce City, Colorado
6:30pm	Rubio 47'; Rosenberry (yellow card) 62'; Bassett 67'; Bombito (yellow card) 87'	Report	Laborda 11'; White 78'	Stadium: Dick's Sporting Goods Park; Attendance: 12,064; Referee: Elton Garcia
Note: Makeup for June 21 postponement due to thunderstorm in area.

September 30 31	Whitecaps FC	2–2	D.C. United	Vancouver, British Columbia
7:30pm	White 2'; Gauld 57' (pen.); Schöpf (yellow card) 82'	Report	Benteke 11'; Klich 62', (yellow card) 69'	Stadium: BC Place; Attendance: 19,442; Referee: Drew Fischer

October 4 32	Whitecaps FC	3–0	St. Louis City SC	Vancouver, British Columbia
7:30pm	White 59'; Gauld (yellow card) 79'; Berhalter 82'; Laryea 90+6'	Report	Löwen (yellow card) 42'	Stadium: BC Place; Attendance: 13,776; Referee: Pierre-Luc Lauziere

October 7 33 Cascadia Cup	Seattle Sounders FC	0–0	Whitecaps FC	Seattle, Washington
7:30pm	C. Roldan (yellow card) 34'; Léo Chú (yellow card) 56'; Yeimar (yellow card) 73'	Report	Laborda (yellow card) 63'; Schöpf (yellow card) 66'; Laryea (yellow card) 90+1'	Stadium: Lumen Field; Attendance: 33,666; Referee: Nima Saghafi

October 21 34	Whitecaps FC	1–1	Los Angeles FC	Vancouver, British Columbia
6:00pm	Gauld (penalty missed) 16', 75'; Ahmed 58'; Adekugbe (yellow card) 71'; Berhalter (yellow card) 76'	Report	Bouanga 34', (yellow card) 45+4'; Palacios (yellow card) 44'; Tillman (yellow card) 51'; Bogusz (yellow card) 57'; Sánchez (yellow card) 69'; Chiellini (yellow card) 73'; Crépeau (yellow card) 74'	Stadium: BC Place; Attendance: 25,146; Referee: Fotis Bazakos

=== MLS Cup Playoffs ===
The Whitecaps clinched a playoff berth on October 4, following a 3–0 win against St. Louis City SC. On October 7, Vancouver ensured that they would receive a bye into Round One of the playoffs following a 0–0 draw against Seattle Sounders FC guaranteeing them a home playoff game for the first time since 2017.

==== Round One ====
October 28 Game 1	Los Angeles FC	5–2	Whitecaps FC	Los Angeles, California
5:00pm	Hollingshead 18', 52'; Vela (yellow card) 22'; Bouanga 29', 64'; Murillo 80'	Report	White 27'; Adekugbe 40'; Brown (yellow card) 41'; Blackmon (yellow card) 55'; Vite (yellow card) 63'; Johnson (yellow card) 82'	Stadium: BMO Stadium; Attendance: 22,002; Referee: Jon Freemon

November 5 Game 2	Whitecaps FC	0–1	Los Angeles FC	Vancouver, British Columbia
4:30pm	Veselinović (yellow card) 22'; Schöpf (yellow card) 90+1'; Adekugbe (yellow card) 90+4'; Becher (yellow card) 90+4'	Report	Bouanga 24' (pen.); González (yellow card) 40'; Olivera (yellow card) 83'	Stadium: BC Place; Attendance: 30,204; Referee: Timothy Ford
Note: Whitecaps FC manager Vanni Sartini was sent off (red card) in the 90+4th minute.

Los Angeles FC won the series 2–0.

== Canadian Championship ==
As champions of the 2022 tournament, the Whitecaps received a bye into the quarter-finals.

May 10 Quarter-finals	York United FC	1–4	Whitecaps FC	Toronto, Ontario
7:30pm ET	Ricci 90'; Soumaoro (yellow card) 90+1'	Report	Adekugbe 64' (o.g.); Becher 76'; Johnson 88'; Gressel 90+2' (pen.); Takaoka (yellow card) 90+3'	Stadium: York Lions Stadium; Attendance: 1,827; Referee: Drew Fischer

May 24 Semi-finals	Pacific FC	0–3	Whitecaps FC	Langford, British Columbia
19:00 PT	Aparicio (yellow card) 47'	Report	Gressel 14'; Ahmed 17'; Córdova (yellow card) 56'; Blackmon (yellow card) 75'; Becher 78'	Stadium: Starlight Stadium; Attendance: 5,221; Referee: Drew Fischer

June 7 Final	Whitecaps FC	2–1	CF Montréal	Vancouver, British Columbia
19:00 PT	White 57'; Gauld 66' (pen.); Berhalter (yellow card) 83'	Report	Lassiter (yellow card) 3'; Camacho (yellow card) 58'; Ibrahim 83'	Stadium: BC Place; Attendance: 20,072; Referee: Filip Dujic

== CONCACAF Champions League ==
=== Round of 16 ===
March 8 First Leg	Whitecaps FC	5–0	(Honduras) Real España	Vancouver, British Columbia
7:00pm PST	Veselinović (yellow card) 7'; Blackmon 21'; Raposo 59'; D. García 64' (o.g.); Vite 70'; White 77'	Report		Stadium: BC Place; Attendance: 13,644; Referee: Fernando Hernández Gómez (Mexico)

March 15 Second Leg	Real España (Honduras)	3–2 (3–7 agg.)	Whitecaps FC	San Pedro Sula, Honduras
4:00pm CST	Montes 67', 86'; Rocca 75', (yellow card) 79'; García (yellow card) 90+1'	Report	Rapaso (yellow card) 44'; Dájome (yellow card) 60'; Ngando (yellow card) 65'; White 66'; Ahmed (yellow card) 69'; Brown (yellow card) 78'; Becher 83'; Blackmon (yellow card) 85'	Stadium: Estadio General Francisco Morazán; Referee: Marco Ortiz (Mexico)

1. Vancouver was initially scheduled to host the second leg, but the order of legs was reversed due to scheduling conflicts in BC Place.

=== Quarterfinals ===
April 5 First Leg	Whitecaps FC	0–3	(United States) Los Angeles FC	Vancouver, British Columbia
7:00pm PDT		Report	Bouanga 55', 65'; Opoku 61'	Stadium: BC Place; Attendance: 11,652; Referee: Fernando Guerrero Ramírez (Mexico)

April 11 Second Leg	Los Angeles FC (United States)	3–0 (6–0 agg.)	Whitecaps FC	Los Angeles, United States
7:15pm PDT	Vela 8' (pen.), 31'; Sánchez (yellow card) 32'; Cifuentes 65'	Report	Berhalter (yellow card) 20'	Stadium: BMO Stadium; Attendance: 18,688; Referee: Juan Calderón (Costa Rica)

== Leagues Cup ==
=== Group stage ===
The Vancouver Whitecaps qualified to the Leagues Cup group stage as a wildcard team. They were drawn into West Group 3.

Pos	Team	Pld	W	PW	PL	L	GF	GA	GD	Pts	Qualification	LEO	VAN	LAX
1	(Mexico) León	2	1	1	0	0	3	2	+1	5	Advance to knockout stage	—	—	—
2	(Canada) Vancouver Whitecaps FC	2	1	0	1	0	4	3	+1	4	Advance to knockout stage	2–2	—	—
3	(United States) LA Galaxy	2	0	0	0	2	1	3	−2	0		0–1	1–2	—

Source: Leagues Cup
Rules for classification: Tiebreakers

July 21 GS	León (Mexico)	2–2 (16–15 p)	Whitecaps FC	Vancouver, British Columbia
22:30 ET	Rodríguez (yellow card) 20'; Moreno 23'; Tesillo (yellow card) 39'; Dávila (yellow card) 45+2'; Hernández 77', (yellow card) 88'	Report	Córdova 44', 57'; Cubas (yellow card) 65'	Stadium: BC Place; Attendance: 17,391; Referee: Fernando Guerrero Ramírez
	Penalties
	Frías (penalty scored); Ramírez (penalty scored); Hernández (penalty missed); Sánchez (penalty missed); Rubio (penalty scored); O. Rodríguez (penalty scored); Tesillo (penalty scored); Ambríz (penalty missed); Romero (penalty scored); Barreiro (penalty scored); Cota (penalty scored); Frías (penalty scored); Hernández (penalty scored); Romero (penalty scored); Tesillo (penalty scored); Rubio (penalty scored); Ramírez (penalty scored); O. Rodríguez (penalty scored); Sánchez (penalty scored)		(penalty scored) Gauld; (penalty scored) Caicedo; (penalty missed) Cubas; (penalty missed) Martins; (penalty scored) White; (penalty scored) Blackmon; (penalty scored) Veselinović; (penalty missed) Laborda; (penalty scored) Becher; (penalty scored) Teibert; (penalty scored) Takaoka; (penalty scored) Gauld; (penalty scored) Caicedo; (penalty scored) White; (penalty scored) Veselinović; (penalty scored) Blackmon; (penalty scored) Becher; (penalty scored) Cubas; (penalty missed) Martins

July 30 GS	LA Galaxy (United States)	1–2	Whitecaps FC	Carson, California
21:00 ET	Puig 16'; Costa (yellow card) 48'	Report	Cubas (yellow card) 42'; Calegari 81' (o.g.); White 90+1'	Stadium: Dignity Health Sports Park; Attendance: 14,787; Referee: Walter López Castellanos

=== Knockout stage ===
August 4 R32	UANL (Mexico)	1–1 (5–3 p)	Whitecaps FC	Vancouver, British Columbia
22:30 ET	Gignac 53'; Lainez (yellow card) 65'; Guzmán (yellow card) 96'	Report	Vite 9'; Brown (yellow card) 38'; Gauld (yellow card) 52'	Stadium: BC Place; Attendance: 13,703; Referee: Lukasz Szpala
	Penalties
	Gignac (penalty scored); Ibáñez (penalty scored); Angulo (penalty scored); Córdova (penalty scored); Gorriarán (penalty scored)		(penalty scored) Vite; (penalty scored) Córdova; (penalty scored) White; (penalty missed) Veselinović

== Cascadia Cup ==
2023 Cascadia Cup standings
Pos	Team	Pld	W	D	L	GF	GA	GD	Pts
1	Vancouver Whitecaps FC	6	3	1	2	9	8	+1	10
2	Portland Timbers	6	2	2	2	11	8	+3	8
3	Seattle Sounders FC	6	1	3	2	6	10	−4	6

Source: "Schedule". mlssoccer.com.
Rules for classification: Scoring

Overall								Home						Away					
Pld	Pts	W	L	T	GF	GA	GD	W	L	T	GF	GA	GD	W	L	T	GF	GA	GD
6	10	3	2	1	9	8	+1	2	1	0	5	3	+2	1	1	1	4	5	−1

Last updated: October 7, 2023
Source: Standings
Pld = Matches played; Pts = Points; W = Matches won; T = Matches tied; L = Matches lost; GF = Goals for; GA = Goals against; GD = Goal difference

== Statistics ==
=== Appearances and goals ===
As of November 5, 2023

No.	Pos	Nat	Player	Total		MLS		MLS Playoffs		Canadian Championship		Leagues Cup		Champions League	
No.	Pos	Nat	Player	Apps	Goals	Apps	Goals	Apps	Goals	Apps	Goals	Apps	Goals	Apps	Goals
Goalkeepers
1	GK	(Canada) CAN	Thomas Hasal	3	0	1	0	0	0	0	0	0	0	2	0
18	GK	(Japan) JPN	Yohei Takaoka	42	0	33	0	2	0	3	0	2	0	2	0
50	GK	(Canada) CAN	Max Anchor	0	0	0	0	0	0	0	0	0	0	0	0
60	GK	(Canada) CAN	Isaac Boehmer	1	0	0	0	0	0	0	0	1	0	0	0
Defenders
2	DF	(Uruguay) URU	Mathías Laborda	32	1	17+6	1	1	0	2	0	2+1	0	2+1	0
3	DF	(Canada) CAN	Sam Adekugbe	12	0	4+6	0	2	0	0	0	0	0	0	0
4	DF	(Serbia) SRB	Ranko Veselinović	42	2	31+1	2	2	0	2	0	3	0	3	0
6	DF	(United States) USA	Tristan Blackmon	42	3	28+2	2	2	0	3	0	2+1	0	3+1	1
7	DF	(Canada) CAN	Richie Laryea	14	1	12	1	2	0	0	0	0	0	0	0
12	DF	(Canada) CAN	Karifa Yao	5	0	0+1	0	0	0	0+1	0	0+1	0	1+1	0
14	DF	(Portugal) POR	Luís Martins	25	0	18+2	0	0+1	0	0+2	0	1	0	0+1	0
23	DF	(Jamaica) JAM	Javain Brown	31	1	20+4	1	1	0	1+1	0	1	0	2+1	0
61	DF	(Canada) CAN	Matteo Campagna	1	0	0	0	0	0	0	0	0	0	0+1	0
Midfielders
8	MF	(Austria) AUT	Alessandro Schöpf	34	1	21+7	1	1+1	0	1	0	3	0	0	0
16	MF	(United States) USA	Sebastian Berhalter	37	2	11+17	2	0+1	0	1+1	0	2	0	2+2	0
20	MF	(Paraguay) PAR	Andrés Cubas	37	0	27+1	0	2	0	2	0	3	0	2	0
22	MF	(Canada) CAN	Ali Ahmed	30	3	12+10	2	1+1	0	2	1	0+1	0	2+1	0
25	MF	(Scotland) SCO	Ryan Gauld	42	12	30+2	11	2	0	2	1	3	0	3	0
26	MF	(Cameroon) CMR	J.C. Ngando	14	0	0+8	0	0	0	0+1	0	2	0	1+2	0
27	MF	(Canada) CAN	Ryan Raposo	36	1	15+11	0	0+1	0	3	0	2	0	4	1
30	MF	(Canada) CAN	Kamron Habibullah	0	0	0	0	0	0	0	0	0	0	0	0
31	MF	(Canada) CAN	Russell Teibert	15	0	0+7	0	0	0	3	0	0+2	0	2+1	0
45	MF	(Ecuador) ECU	Pedro Vite	45	6	24+10	4	2	0	0+3	0	1+1	1	2+2	1
66	MF	(United States) USA	Giovanni Aguilar	1	0	0+1	0	0	0	0	0	0	0	0	0
Forwards
11	FW	(Canada) CAN	Junior Hoilett	9	0	2+5	0	0+2	0	0	0	0	0	0	0
24	FW	(United States) USA	Brian White	43	19	30+2	15	2	0	2	1	2+1	1	2+2	2
28	FW	(Canada) CAN	Levonte Johnson	12	1	2+5	0	0+1	0	1+1	1	1+1	0	0	0
29	FW	(United States) USA	Simon Becher	25	7	5+14	4	0+1	0	1+1	2	0+1	0	0+2	1
Players transferred out during the season
3	DF	(Canada) CAN	Cristián Gutiérrez	0	0	0	0	0	0	0	0	0	0	0	0
7	FW	(Colombia) COL	Déiber Caicedo	19	0	0+14	0	0	0	1+1	0	0+2	0	1	0
9	FW	(Venezuela) VEN	Sergio Córdova	26	4	8+11	2	0	0	1+1	0	2+1	2	2	0
11	FW	(Colombia) COL	Cristian Dájome	11	0	4+3	0	0	0	0	0	0	0	4	0
19	MF	(United States) USA	Julian Gressel	24	5	16+2	3	0	0	2+1	2	0	0	2+1	0
52	MF	(Peru) PER	Vasco Fry	1	0	0	0	0	0	0	0	0	0	0+1	0

Source: Competitions

=== Goalscorers ===
As of November 5, 2023

Rank	No.	Pos	Nat	Name	MLS	MLS Playoffs	Canadian Championship	Leagues Cup	Champions League	Total
1	24	FW	(United States)	Brian White	15	1	1	1	2	20
2	25	MF	(Scotland)	Ryan Gauld	11	0	1	0	0	12
3	29	FW	(United States)	Simon Becher	4	0	2	0	1	7
4	45	MF	(Ecuador)	Pedro Vite	4	0	0	1	1	6
5	19	DF	(United States)	Julian Gressel	3	0	2	0	0	5
6	9	FW	(Venezuela)	Sergio Córdova	2	0	0	2	0	4
7	6	DF	(United States)	Tristan Blackmon	2	0	0	0	1	3
7	22	MF	(Canada)	Ali Ahmed	2	0	1	0	0	3
9	4	DF	(Serbia)	Ranko Veselinović	2	0	0	0	0	2
9	16	MF	(United States)	Sebastian Berhalter	2	0	0	0	0	2
11	2	DF	(Uruguay)	Mathías Laborda	1	0	0	0	0	1
11	3	DF	(Canada)	Sam Adekugbe	0	1	0	0	0	1
11	7	DF	(Canada)	Richie Laryea	1	0	0	0	0	1
11	8	MF	(Austria)	Alessandro Schöpf	1	0	0	0	0	1
11	23	DF	(Jamaica)	Javain Brown	1	0	0	0	0	1
11	27	MF	(Canada)	Ryan Raposo	0	0	0	0	1	1
11	28	FW	(Canada)	Levonte Johnson	0	0	1	0	0	1
Own goals					4	0	1	1	1	6
Totals					55	2	9	5	7	78

=== Clean sheets ===
As of November 5, 2023

Rank	No.	Pos	Nat	Name	MLS	MLS Playoffs	Canadian Championship	Leagues Cup	Champions League	Total
1	18	GK	(Japan)	Yohei Takaoka	8	0	1	0	1	10
Totals					8	0	1	0	1	10

=== Disciplinary record ===
As of November 5, 2023

No.	Pos	Nat	Player	MLS			MLS Playoffs			Canadian Championship			Leagues Cup			Champions League			Total		
No.	Pos	Nat	Player	Yellow card	(yellow card) (yellow-red card)	Red card	Yellow card	(yellow card) (yellow-red card)	Red card	Yellow card	(yellow card) (yellow-red card)	Red card	Yellow card	(yellow card) (yellow-red card)	Red card	Yellow card	(yellow card) (yellow-red card)	Red card	Yellow card	(yellow card) (yellow-red card)	Red card
1	GK	(Canada)	Thomas Hasal	0	0	0	0	0	0	0	0	0	0	0	0	0	0	0	0	0	0
2	DF	(Uruguay)	Mathías Laborda	6	1	0	0	0	0	0	0	0	0	0	0	0	0	0	6	1	0
3	DF	(Canada)	Sam Adekugbe	2	0	0	1	0	0	0	0	0	0	0	0	0	0	0	3	0	0
3	DF	(Canada)	Cristián Gutiérrez	0	0	0	0	0	0	0	0	0	0	0	0	0	0	0	0	0	0
4	DF	(Serbia)	Ranko Veselinović	2	0	0	1	0	0	0	0	0	0	0	0	1	0	0	4	0	0
6	DF	(United States)	Tristan Blackmon	5	0	0	1	0	0	1	0	0	0	0	0	1	0	0	7	0	0
7	FW	(Colombia)	Déiber Caicedo	0	0	0	0	0	0	0	0	0	0	0	0	0	0	0	0	0	0
7	DF	(Canada)	Richie Laryea	2	0	0	0	0	0	0	0	0	0	0	0	0	0	0	2	0	0
8	MF	(Austria)	Alessandro Schöpf	5	0	0	1	0	0	0	0	0	0	0	0	0	0	0	6	0	0
9	FW	(Venezuela)	Sergio Córdova	1	0	0	0	0	0	1	0	0	0	0	0	0	0	0	2	0	0
11	FW	(Colombia)	Cristian Dájome	0	0	0	0	0	0	0	0	0	0	0	0	1	0	0	1	0	0
12	DF	(Canada)	Karifa Yao	0	0	0	0	0	0	0	0	0	0	0	0	0	0	0	0	0	0
14	DF	(Portugal)	Luís Martins	2	0	0	0	0	0	0	0	0	0	0	0	0	0	0	2	0	0
16	MF	(United States)	Sebastian Berhalter	6	0	0	0	0	0	1	0	0	0	0	0	1	0	0	8	0	0
18	GK	(Japan)	Yohei Takaoka	0	0	0	0	0	0	1	0	0	0	0	0	0	0	0	1	0	0
19	DF	(United States)	Julian Gressel	2	0	0	0	0	0	0	0	0	0	0	0	0	0	0	2	0	0
20	MF	(Paraguay)	Andrés Cubas	7	0	0	0	0	0	0	0	0	2	0	0	0	0	0	9	0	0
22	MF	(Canada)	Ali Ahmed	2	0	0	0	0	0	0	0	0	0	0	0	1	0	0	3	0	0
23	DF	(Jamaica)	Javain Brown	4	0	0	1	0	0	0	0	0	1	0	0	1	0	0	6	0	0
24	FW	(United States)	Brian White	4	0	0	0	0	0	0	0	0	0	0	0	0	0	0	4	0	0
25	MF	(Scotland)	Ryan Gauld	5	0	0	0	0	0	0	0	0	1	0	0	0	0	0	6	0	0
26	MF	(Cameroon)	J.C. Ngando	0	0	0	0	0	0	0	0	0	0	0	0	1	0	0	1	0	0
27	MF	(Canada)	Ryan Raposo	5	0	0	0	0	0	0	0	0	0	0	0	1	0	0	6	0	0
28	FW	(Canada)	Levonte Johnson	0	0	0	1	0	0	0	0	0	0	0	0	0	0	0	0	0	0
29	FW	(United States)	Simon Becher	0	0	0	1	0	0	0	0	0	0	0	0	0	0	0	1	0	0
30	MF	(Canada)	Kamron Habibullah	0	0	0	0	0	0	0	0	0	0	0	0	0	0	0	0	0	0
31	MF	(Canada)	Russell Teibert	0	0	0	0	0	0	0	0	0	0	0	0	0	0	0	0	0	0
45	MF	(Ecuador)	Pedro Vite	4	0	0	1	0	0	0	0	0	0	0	0	0	0	0	4	0	0
50	GK	(Canada)	Max Anchor	0	0	0	0	0	0	0	0	0	0	0	0	0	0	0	0	0	0
60	GK	(Canada)	Isaac Boehmer	0	0	0	0	0	0	0	0	0	0	0	0	0	0	0	0	0	0
61	MF	(Canada)	Matteo Campagna	0	0	0	0	0	0	0	0	0	0	0	0	0	0	0	0	0	0
Totals				62	1	0	8	0	0	4	0	0	4	0	0	8	0	0	85	1	0
