= 2022 Vancouver Whitecaps FC season =

Vancouver Whitecaps FC 2022 soccer season

Vancouver Whitecaps FC
- Chairman: Jeff Mallett
- Head coach: Vanni Sartini
- Stadium: BC Place (Vancouver, BC)
- Major League Soccer: Conference: 9th of 14; Overall: 17th of 28
- MLS Cup playoffs: Did not qualify
- Canadian Championship: Winners
- Top goalscorer: League: Lucas Cavallini (9); All: Lucas Cavallini (9)
- Highest home attendance: League/All: 24,307; July 26 vs. Toronto FC
- Lowest home attendance: League/All: 7,803; May 11 vs. Valour FC
- Average home league attendance: 18,643
- Biggest win: VAN 3–0 LA (MLS 9/14)
- Biggest defeat: CLB 4–0 VAN (MLS 2/26); SEA 4–0 VAN (MLS 6/14)
Home colours	Away colours

The 2022 Vancouver Whitecaps FC season was the club's twelfth season in Major League Soccer, the top division of soccer in the United States and Canada. Including previous iterations of the franchise, this was the 45th season of professional soccer being played in Vancouver under a variation of the "Whitecaps" name.

On November 30, 2021, Vanni Sartini was named the permanent manager after taking over as the acting manager during the 2021 season.

== Roster ==
As of August 15, 2022

No.	Player	Nationality	Position	Date of birth (age)	Previous club
Goalkeepers
1	Thomas Hasal	(Canada)	GK	July 2, 1999 (age 27)	(Canada) Vancouver Whitecaps FC U-23
55	Cody Cropper	(United States)	GK	February 16, 1993 (age 33)	(United States) FC Cincinnati
60	Isaac Boehmer	(Canada)	GK	November 20, 2001 (age 24)	(Canada) Vancouver Whitecaps Development Squad
Defenders
2	Marcus Godinho	(Canada)	DF	June 28, 1997 (age 29)	(Germany) FSV Zwickau
3	Cristián Gutiérrez	(Canada)	DF	February 18, 1997 (age 29)	(Chile) Colo-Colo
4	Ranko Veselinović	(Serbia)	DF	March 24, 1999 (age 27)	(Serbia) Vojvodina
6	Tristan Blackmon	(United States)	DF	August 12, 1996 (age 30)	(United States) Charlotte FC
14	Luís Martins	(Portugal)	DF	June 10, 1992 (age 34)	(United States) Sporting Kansas City
19	Julian Gressel	(Germany)	DF	December 16, 1993 (age 32)	(United States) D.C. United
23	Javain Brown	(Jamaica)	DF	March 19, 1999 (age 27)	(United States) South Florida Bulls
26	Florian Jungwirth	(Germany)	DF	January 27, 1989 (age 37)	(United States) San Jose Earthquakes
28	Jake Nerwinski	(United States)	DF	October 17, 1994 (age 32)	(United States) Connecticut Huskies
Midfielders
15	Janio Bikel	(Guinea-Bissau)	MF	June 28, 1995 (age 31)	(Bulgaria) CSKA Sofia
16	Sebastian Berhalter	(United States)	MF	May 10, 2001 (age 25)	(United States) Columbus Crew
17	Leonard Owusu	(Ghana)	MF	June 3, 1997 (age 29)	(Israel) Ashdod
18	Alessandro Schöpf	(Austria)	MF	February 7, 1994 (age 32)	(Germany) Arminia Bielefeld
20	Andrés Cubas	(Paraguay)	MF	May 22, 1996 (age 30)	(France) Nîmes
25	Ryan Gauld	(Scotland)	MF	December 16, 1995 (age 30)	(Portugal) Farense
27	Ryan Raposo	(Canada)	MF	March 5, 1999 (age 27)	(United States) Syracuse Orange
31	Russell Teibert	(Canada)	MF	December 22, 1992 (age 33)	(Canada) Vancouver Whitecaps (USSF-D2)
33	Michael Baldisimo	(Canada)	MF	April 13, 2000 (age 26)	(Canada) Vancouver Whitecaps FC Residency
45	Pedro Vite	(Ecuador)	MF	March 9, 2002 (age 24)	(Ecuador) Independiente del Valle
Forwards
7	Déiber Caicedo	(Colombia)	FW	March 25, 2000 (age 26)	(Colombia) Deportivo Cali
9	Lucas Cavallini	(Canada)	FW	December 28, 1992 (age 33)	(Mexico) Club Puebla
11	Cristian Dájome	(Colombia)	FW	January 3, 1994 (age 32)	(Colombia) Atlético Nacional
24	Brian White	(United States)	FW	February 3, 1996 (age 30)	(United States) New York Red Bulls
49	Emiliano Brienza	(Mexico)	FW	May 9, 2002 (age 24)	(Canada) Whitecaps FC 2
87	Tosaint Ricketts	(Canada)	FW	August 6, 1987 (age 39)	(Lithuania) Sūduva
Out on Loan
8	Caio Alexandre	(Brazil)	MF	February 24, 1999 (age 27)	(Brazil) Botafogo
12	Evan Newton	(United States)	GK	April 1, 1988 (age 38)	(United States) Indy Eleven
13	Derek Cornelius	(Canada)	DF	November 25, 1997 (age 28)	(Serbia) Javor Ivanjica
18	David Egbo	(Nigeria)	FW	October 31, 1998 (age 28)	(United States) Akron Zips
30	Kamron Habibullah	(Canada)	MF	October 3, 2003 (age 23)	(Canada) Vancouver Whitecaps FC U-23
61	Matteo Campagna	(Canada)	MF	June 27, 2004 (age 22)	(Canada) Vancouver Whitecaps FC U-23

== Transfers ==
=== In ===
==== Transferred in ====
#	Position	Player	Transferred from	Fee/notes	Date	Source
6	DF	(United States) Tristan Blackmon	(United States) Charlotte FC	Acquired in exchange for $475,000 GAM over two years	December 14, 2021	
16	MF	(United States) Sebastian Berhalter	(United States) Columbus Crew	Acquired in exchange for $50,000 GAM	February 4, 2022	
55	GK	(United States) Cody Cropper	(United States) Memphis 901	Free	March 15, 2022	
20	MF	(Paraguay) Andrés Cubas	(France) Nîmes	Undisclosed/Designated Player	April 28, 2022	
14	DF	(Portugal) Luís Martins	(United States) Sporting Kansas City	Free	May 4, 2022	
19	DF	(Germany) Julian Gressel	(United States) D.C. United	Acquired in exchange for up to $900,000 GAM over three years	July 15, 2022	
18	MF	(Austria) Alessandro Schöpf	(Germany) Arminia Bielefeld	Free	August 3, 2022	

==== Loans in ====
#	Position	Player	Loaned from	Date	Loan expires	Notes	Source
32	GK	(Canada) Niko Giantsopoulos	(Canada) York United FC	May 20, 2022	May 23, 2022	Emergency hardship loan	
50	GK	(Canada) Max Anchor	(Canada) Whitecaps FC Academy	May 21, 2022	May 24, 2022	Emergency hardship loan, signed 2023 pre-contract	

=== Out ===
==== Transferred out ====
#	Position	Player	Transferred to	Fee/notes	Date	Source
15	MF	(England) Andy Rose		Out of contract	December 2, 2021	
20	DF	(Tunisia) Jasser Khmiri		Option declined	December 2, 2021	
32	MF	(Canada) Patrick Metcalfe	(Norway) Stabæk	Option declined	December 2, 2021	
16	GK	(Canada) Maxime Crépeau	(United States) Los Angeles FC	Traded for $1 million GAM over three years and a 2025 MLS SuperDraft first-round pick	January 20, 2022	
14	FW	(Canada) Theo Bair	(Scotland) St Johnstone	Undisclosed	January 31, 2022	
34	DF	(Canada) Gianfranco Facchineri		Contract buyout	February 25, 2022	
62	MF	(Canada) Damiano Pecile	(Italy) Venezia	Undisclosed	July 9, 2022	
54	MF	(Canada) Simon Colyn	(Netherlands) Jong PSV	Undisclosed	July 20, 2022	
22	DF	(Argentina) Érik Godoy		Waived	August 4, 2022	

==== Loans out ====
#	Position	Player	Loaned to	Date	Loan expires	Source
62	MF	(Canada) Damiano Pecile	(Italy) Venezia	June 1, 2021	June 30, 2022	
13	DF	(Canada) Derek Cornelius	(Greece) Panetolikos	July 12, 2021	December 31, 2022	
54	MF	(Canada) Simon Colyn	(Netherlands) Jong PSV	August 27, 2021	June 30, 2022	
19	MF	(Guinea-Bissau) Janio Bikel	(Italy) Vicenza	January 21, 2022	June 30, 2022	
12	GK	(United States) Evan Newton	(United States) El Paso Locomotive	January 25, 2022	November 30, 2022	
18	FW	(Nigeria) David Egbo	(United States) Memphis 901	February 24, 2022	November 30, 2022	
30	MF	(Canada) Kamron Habibullah	(Canada) Pacific FC	March 11, 2022	November 30, 2022	
60	GK	(Canada) Isaac Boehmer	(Canada) Whitecaps FC 2	March 25, 2022	November 30, 2022	
61	MF	(Canada) Matteo Campagna	(Canada) Whitecaps FC 2	March 25, 2022	November 30, 2022	
8	MF	(Brazil) Caio Alexandre	(Brazil) Fortaleza	August 15, 2022	December 31, 2022	

== Preseason ==
February 6	Whitecaps FC	2–2	Club Tijuana	San Diego, California
1:00 PM (PST)	Owusu 5'; Ricketts 78'	Report	Godoy 66' (o.g.); Leyva 75'	Stadium: Triton Soccer Stadium

February 9	Whitecaps FC	0–0	New Mexico United	San Diego, California
1:00 PM (PST)		Report	(yellow card) 53'	Stadium: Triton Soccer Stadium

February 12	San Diego Loyal	0–1	Whitecaps FC	San Diego, California
7:00 PM (PST)		Report	Aguilar 83'	Stadium: Torero Stadium

February 16	LA Galaxy	2–4	Whitecaps FC	Carson, California
1:30 PM (PST)	Grandsir 54' (Araujo); Mutatu 74'	Report	White 9' (Gauld), 41' (Brown), 88'; Aguilar 85' (White)	Stadium: Dignity Health Sports Park

== Competition overview ==
Competition	Starting round	Final position	Record							
Competition	Starting round	Final position	Pld	W	D	L	GF	GA	GD	Win %
Major League Soccer	Matchday 1	9th west, 17th overall	34	12	7	15	40	57	−17	35.29
Canadian Championship	Preliminary round	Winners	4	2	2	0	6	3	+3	50.00
Total			38	14	9	15	46	60	−14	36.84

Last updated: 9 October 2022
Source: Competitions

== Major League Soccer ==
=== Regular season ===
==== League tables ====
===== Western Conference =====
Pos	Team	Pld	W	L	T	GF	GA	GD	Pts	Qualification
7	Real Salt Lake	34	12	11	11	43	45	−2	47	Qualification for the first round
8	Portland Timbers	34	11	10	13	53	53	0	46	
9	Vancouver Whitecaps FC (Note: Canadian clubs could not qualify for the 2023 CONCACAF Champions League through the MLS regular season or playoffs.)	34	12	15	7	40	57	−17	43	Qualification for the CONCACAF Champions League (Note: as 2022 Canadian Championship winners.)
10	Colorado Rapids	34	11	13	10	46	57	−11	43	
11	Seattle Sounders FC	34	12	17	5	47	46	+1	41	

Source: MLS
Rules for classification: 1) points; 2) total wins; 3) total goal differential; 4) total goals scored; 5) fewer disciplinary points; 6) away goal differential; 7) away goals scored; 8) home goals differential; 9) home goals scored; 10) coin toss (2 clubs tied) or drawing of lots (≥3 clubs tied)

===== Overall =====
Pos	Team	Pld	W	L	T	GF	GA	GD	Pts	
15	Portland Timbers	34	11	10	13	53	53	0	46	
16	Columbus Crew	34	10	8	16	46	41	+5	46	
17	Vancouver Whitecaps FC (Note: Canadian clubs could not qualify for the 2023 CONCACAF Champions League through the MLS regular season or playoffs.) (V)	34	12	15	7	40	57	−17	43	Qualification for the CONCACAF Champions League (Note: As 2022 Canadian Championship winners (CAN1))
18	Colorado Rapids	34	11	13	10	46	57	−11	43	
19	Charlotte FC	34	13	18	3	44	52	−8	42	

Source: MLS
Rules for classification: 1) points; 2) total wins; 3) total goal differential; 4) total goals scored; 5) fewer disciplinary points; 6) away goal differential; 7) away goals scored; 8) home goals differential; 9) home goals scored; 10) coin toss (2 clubs tied) or drawing of lots (≥3 clubs tied)
(V) Canadian Championship winners

==== Results ====
Overall								Home						Away					
Pld	Pts	W	L	D	GF	GA	GD	W	L	D	GF	GA	GD	W	L	D	GF	GA	GD
34	43	12	15	7	40	57	−17	10	4	3	25	20	+5	2	11	4	15	37	−22

Last updated: October 9, 2022
Pld = Matches played; Pts = Points; W = Matches won; T = Matches tied; L = Matches lost; GF = Goals for; GA = Goals against; GD = Goal difference

Match record by conference (W–L–D)
Conference	Home	Away	Total
Western	8–3–2	2–8–3	10–11–5
Eastern	2–1–1	0–3–1	2–4–2

Results by round
Round	1	2	3	4	5	6	7	8	9	10	11	12	13	14	15	16	17	18	19	20	21	22	23	24	25	26	27	28	29	30	31	32	33	34
Ground	A	H	A	A	H	H	A	A	H	H	H	A	A	H	A	A	H	H	H	A	A	H	A	H	A	H	A	H	A	A	H	H	H	A
Result	L	D	L	L	W	L	L	L	W	D	W	L	W	W	L	W	D	W	L	D	D	L	D	W	L	W	D	L	L	L	W	W	W	L

Updated to match(es) played on October 9, 2022. Source:
A = Away; H = Home; N = Neutral; W = Win; D = Draw; L = Loss

==== Matches ====
February 26 1	Columbus Crew	4–0	Whitecaps FC	Columbus, Ohio
12:30 PM (PST)	Berry 8'; Etienne 25', (yellow card) 65'; Yeboah (yellow card) 40'; Morris (yellow card) 79'; Díaz 84'; Zelarayán 86'	Report	Caicedo (yellow card) 22'; Nerwinski (yellow card) 26' (yellow-red card) 53'	Stadium: Lower.com Field; Attendance: 18,939; Referee: Nima Saghafi

March 5 2	Whitecaps FC	0–0	New York City FC	Vancouver, British Columbia
3:00 PM (PST)	Cavallini (yellow card) 39'; Jungwirth (yellow card) 62'	Report	Castellanos (yellow card) 62'; Rodríguez (yellow card) 90'	Stadium: BC Place; Attendance: 18,643; Referee: Marcos de Oliveira

March 12 3	Houston Dynamo FC	2–1	Whitecaps FC	Houston, Texas
3:30 PM (PST)	Quintero 33', 51'; Úlfarsson (yellow card) 87'	Report	Cavallini 14'; Brown (yellow card) 28'; Veselinović (yellow card) 80'	Stadium: PNC Stadium; Attendance: 13,028; Referee: Pierre-Luc Lauziere

March 20 4	Los Angeles FC	3–1	Whitecaps FC	Los Angeles, California
7:00 PM (PDT)	Hollingshead 27', 70'; Vela (yellow card) 33', (goal) 38'; Fall (yellow card) 61'; Sánchez (yellow card) 90'	Report	Blackmon 12'; Veselinović (yellow card) 20'; Teibert (yellow card) 55'	Stadium: Banc of California Stadium; Attendance: 22,065; Referee: Guido Gonzales Jr.

April 2 5	Whitecaps FC	1–0	Sporting Kansas City	Vancouver, British Columbia
5:00 PM (PDT)	Teibert (yellow card) 37'; Berhalter (yellow card) 45'; Cavallini (yellow card) 60'; Raposo 73'; Godinho (yellow card) 90+4'	Report		Stadium: BC Place; Attendance: 16,772; Referee: Fotis Bazakos

April 9 6 Cascadia Cup	Whitecaps FC	2–3	Portland Timbers	Vancouver, British Columbia
7:00 PM (PDT)	Dájome 76', (penalty missed) 88'; Gauld 90+6' (pen.)	Report	Mabiala (yellow card) 6'; Van Rankin (yellow card) 17'; Asprilla 42' (pen.), (yellow card) 43'; Niezgoda 60'; Y. Chará 78'; Bravo (yellow card) 90+3'	Stadium: BC Place; Attendance: 16,772; Referee: Silviu Petrescu

April 16 7	CF Montréal	2–1	Whitecaps FC	Montreal, Quebec
12:00 PM (PDT)	Mihailovic 1'; Johnston (yellow card) 45'; Quioto 47'; Koné (yellow card) 67'; Hamdy (yellow card) 92'	Report	Berhalter (yellow card) 16'; Brown (yellow card) 40'; White 65'; Veselinović (yellow card) 70'; Vite (yellow card) 76'	Stadium: Saputo Stadium; Attendance: 12,042; Referee: Nima Saghafi

April 23 8	Austin FC	3–0	Whitecaps FC	Austin, Texas
5:30 PM (PDT)	Urruti 11', 26'; Ring (yellow card) 35'; Gabrielsen (yellow card) 45+1'; Driussi 68'; Pereira (yellow card) 90'	Report	Blackmon (yellow card) 25'; Cavallini (yellow card) 75'; White (yellow card) 90+2'	Stadium: Q2 Stadium; Attendance: 20,738; Referee: Ramy Touchan

May 8 10	Whitecaps FC	1–0	Toronto FC	Vancouver, British Columbia
1:00 PM (PDT)	Cavallini (yellow card) 71'; Ricketts 90'	Report	O'Neill (yellow card) 11'; Pozuelo (penalty missed) 35'; Kerr (yellow card) 45+1'	Stadium: BC Place; Attendance: 17,709; Referee: Victor Rivas

May 14 11	Whitecaps FC	3–3	San Jose Earthquakes	Vancouver, British Columbia
4:00 PM (PDT)	Godoy (yellow card) 5', (goal) 90+1'; Teibert (yellow card) 14'; Dájome (yellow card) 33'; Cavallini 52'; Raposo 75'	Report	Nathan (yellow card) 27'; Monteiro 62'; Ebobisse 73', 81'	Stadium: BC Place; Attendance: 15,087; Referee: Timothy Ford

May 18 12	Whitecaps FC	2–1	FC Dallas	Vancouver, British Columbia
7:00 PM (PDT)	Baldisimo (yellow card) 40'; Brown (yellow card) 45'; White 71'; Cavallini 90+2' (pen.), (yellow card) 90+7'	Report	Arriola 45+3'; Pomykal (yellow card) 51'; Twumasi (yellow card) 90+7'	Stadium: BC Place; Attendance: 12,716; Referee: Ismir Pekmic

May 22 13	Charlotte FC	2–1	Whitecaps FC	Charlotte, North Carolina
2:00 PM (PDT)	Shinyashiki 8'; Jóźwiak (yellow card) 62'; Ríos 85'	Report	Ricketts 2'	Stadium: Bank of America Stadium; Attendance: 32,034; Referee: Nima Saghafi

May 28 14	Sporting KC	0–1	Whitecaps FC	Kansas City, Kansas
6:00 PM (PDT)	Ford (yellow card) 13'; Fontàs (yellow card) 44'; Russell (yellow card) 57'	Report	Cavallini 24' (pen.); Berhalter (yellow card) 27'; Gutiérrez (yellow card) 52'	Stadium: Children's Mercy Park; Attendance: 19,206; Referee: Ted Unkel

June 4 15	Whitecaps FC	2–1	Real Salt Lake	Vancouver, British Columbia
4:00 PM (PDT)	Veselinović 31'; Caicedo (yellow card) 38'; Jungwirth (yellow card) 76'; Alexandre (yellow card) 90'; Gauld 90+3' (pen.)	Report	Herrera (yellow card) 28' (yellow-red card) 90+1'; Meram 52', (yellow card) 62'; Löeffelsend (yellow card) 68'	Stadium: BC Place; Attendance: 17,134; Referee: Jon Freemon

June 14 9 Cascadia Cup	Seattle Sounders FC	4–0	Whitecaps FC	Seattle, Washington
7:30 PM PDT	Lodeiro 5' (pen.); Ruidiaz 28', 54'; Roldan 89'	Report	Cubas (yellow card) 65'; Alexandre (yellow card) 79'	Stadium: Lumen Field; Attendance: 31,165; Referee: Lukasz Szpala

June 18 16	FC Dallas	0–2	Whitecaps FC	Frisco, Texas
4:00 PM (PDT)	Quignón (yellow card) 42'; Farfan (yellow card) 45+2'; Velasco (yellow card) 54'	Report	Cavallini 2'; Caicedo 44'	Stadium: Toyota Stadium; Attendance: 19,096; Referee: Tori Penso

June 26 17	Whitecaps FC	0–0	New England Revolution	Vancouver, British Columbia
5:00 PM (PDT)	Dájome (yellow card) 24'	Report	McNamara (yellow card) 69'	Stadium: BC Place; Attendance: 15,084; Referee: Filip Dujic

July 2 18	Whitecaps FC	1–0	Los Angeles FC	Vancouver, British Columbia
7:00 PM (PDT)	Cavallini (yellow card) 27'; Gauld (yellow card) 55'; Cubas 89'	Report	Murillo (yellow card) 39'; Fall (yellow card) 88'	Stadium: BC Place; Attendance: 18,292; Referee: Guido Gonzales Jr

July 8 19	Whitecaps FC	1–3	Minnesota United FC	Vancouver, British Columbia
7:30 PM (PDT)	Cavallini 66'	Report	Lod (yellow card) 24'; Lawrence 71'; Amarilla 84'; Fragapane 88'	Stadium: BC Place; Attendance: 14,201; Referee: Alex Chilowicz

July 13 20	FC Cincinnati	2–2	Whitecaps FC	Cincinnati, Ohio
5:00 PM (PDT)	Barreal 3'; Vazquez 23'; Nwobodo (yellow card) 52'; Blackett (yellow card) 58'	Report	Gauld 5', (yellow card) 90+3'; Teibert (yellow card) 38'; Dájome 82'	Stadium: TQL Stadium; Attendance: 21,078; Referee: Pierre-Luc Lauziere

July 17 21 Cascadia Cup	Portland Timbers	1–1	Whitecaps FC	Portland, Oregon
7:30 PM (PDT)	Van Rankin (yellow card) 44'; Mora 82' (pen.); Župarić (yellow card) 84'; Blanco (yellow card) 90'	Report	White 32'; Cavallini (yellow card) 46'; Raposo (yellow card) 48'	Stadium: Providence Park; Attendance: 24,337; Referee: Ramy Touchan

July 23 22	Whitecaps FC	1–3	Chicago Fire FC	Vancouver, British Columbia
7:00 PM (PDT)	Cavallini 54'; Dájome (yellow card) 65'; Jungwirth (yellow card) 82'	Report	Shaqiri 13'; Czichos 76'; Mueller 90'	Stadium: BC Place; Attendance: 14,984; Referee: Joseph Dickerson

July 30 23	Nashville SC	1–1	Whitecaps FC	Nashville, Tennessee
5:00 PM (PDT)	Bunbury 17'; Maher (yellow card) 86'	Report	Blackmon (yellow card) 33'; Baldisimo (yellow card) 47'; Raposo (yellow card) 56'; Brown 87'; Gauld (yellow card) 90+2'	Stadium: Geodis Park; Attendance: 26,578; Referee: Marcos de Oliveira
Note: Whitecaps FC manager Vanni Sartini was cautioned (yellow card) in the 90+6th minute for dissent.

August 5 24	Whitecaps FC	2–1	Houston Dynamo	Vancouver, British Columbia
7:30 PM (PDT)	Cavallini (yellow card) 78', (goal) 90+2'; Gauld (yellow card) 81'; Becher 88'	Report	Picault 6'; Herrera (yellow card) 53'	Stadium: BC Place; Attendance: 14,668; Referee: Fotis Bazakos

August 13 25	LA Galaxy	5–2	Whitecaps FC	Carson, California
7:00 PM (PDT)	Grandsir 12', 40'; Hernández 20' (pen.); Vázquez 30'; Coulibaly (yellow card) 59'; Araujo (yellow card) 63'; Edwards (yellow card) 71'; Álvarez 89'; DePuy (yellow card) 90+4'	Report	Gauld 38'; Veselinović (yellow card) 68'; Ricketts 70'; Dájome (yellow card) 72' (yellow-red card) 79'	Stadium: Dignity Health Sports Park; Attendance: 21,465; Referee: Silviu Petrescu

August 17 26	Whitecaps FC	2–1	Colorado Rapids	Vancouver, British Columbia
7:00 PM (PDT)	Gauld 14', 40'	Report	Zardes 76'; Priso (yellow card) 90+7'	Stadium: BC Place; Attendance: 14,682; Referee: Filip Dujic

August 20 27	Real Salt Lake	1–1	Whitecaps FC	Sandy, Utah
7:00 PM (PDT)	Löeffelsend (yellow card) 12'; Córdova 61'	Report	Teibert (yellow card) 18'; Gressel 87'; Berhalter (yellow card) 90+2'	Stadium: Rio Tinto Stadium; Attendance: 20,567; Referee: Ismir Pekmic

August 27 28	Whitecaps FC	0–3	Nashville SC	Vancouver, British Columbia
7:00 PM (PDT)	Brown (yellow card) 36'; Blackmon (yellow card) 44'; Cavallini (red card) 53'	Report	Leal 19'; Maher 23', 50'; Washington (yellow card) 63'; Davis (yellow card) 76'; Lovitz (yellow card) 90'	Stadium: BC Place; Attendance: 16,361; Referee: Jon Freemon

September 4 29	San Jose Earthquakes	2–0	Whitecaps FC	San Jose, California
6:30 PM (PDT)	Ebobisse 4'; Monteiro 34'; Kikanović (yellow card) 90+1'	Report	Cubas (yellow card) 31'; Gauld (yellow card) 43'; Blackmon (yellow card) 62'	Stadium: PayPal Park; Attendance: 13,211; Referee: Rosendo Mendoza

September 10 30	Colorado Rapids	3–1	Whitecaps FC	Commerce City, Colorado
6:30 PM (PDT)	Zardes 21'; Rubio 33'; Lewis 75'	Report	White 9'; Veselinović (yellow card) 32'; Schöpf (yellow card) 52'	Stadium: Dick's Sporting Goods Park; Attendance: 14,036; Referee: Kevin Stott

September 14 31	Whitecaps FC	3–0	LA Galaxy	Vancouver, British Columbia
7:00 PM (PDT)	Owusu (yellow card) 7'; Martins (yellow card) 38'; Gauld 57'; Vite (yellow card) 62', (goal) 68'; Berhalter (yellow card) 82'; Ricketts 86'	Report	Vázquez (yellow card) 63'	Stadium: BC Place; Attendance: 16,681; Referee: Fotis Bazakos

September 17 32 Cascadia Cup	Whitecaps FC	2–1	Seattle Sounders FC	Vancouver, British Columbia
7:00 PM (PDT)	Vite 29'; Gressel 37', (yellow card) 82'	Report	A. Roldan (yellow card) 25'; Lodeiro (yellow card) 81'; Bruin 89'	Stadium: BC Place; Attendance: 19,722; Referee: Ramy Touchan

October 1 33	Whitecaps FC	2–0	Austin FC	Vancouver, British Columbia
7:00 PM (PDT)	Gauld 7'; Cavallini 62', (yellow card) 90+1'; Blackmon (yellow card) 90+7'	Report	Romaña (yellow card) 18'; Ring (yellow card) 57'; Felipe (yellow card) 90+1'; Cascante (yellow card) 90+7'	Stadium: BC Place; Attendance: 19,292; Referee: Timothy Ford
Note: Austin FC manager Josh Wolff was cautioned (yellow card) in the 18th minute for dissent.

October 9 34	Minnesota United FC	2–0	Whitecaps FC	Saint Paul, Minnesota
2:00 PM (PDT)	Fragapane 17'; Trapp (yellow card) 33'; González 77'	Report	Gauld (yellow card) 90'	Stadium: Allianz Field; Attendance: 19,941; Referee: Allen Chapman

== Canadian Championship ==
May 11 Preliminary round	Whitecaps FC	2–0	Valour FC	Vancouver, British Columbia
7:00 PM (PDT)	Teibert 19'; Raposo 22'; Cavallini (yellow card) 52'	Report	D. Gutiérrez (yellow card) 39'; Fordyce (yellow card) 74'	Stadium: BC Place; Attendance: 7,809; Referee: Alain Ruch

May 25 Quarter-finals	Cavalry FC	1–1 (3–5 p)	Whitecaps FC	Foothills County, Alberta
6:00 PM (PDT)	C. Trafford (yellow card) 47'; Bevan 72'	Report	Baldisimo (yellow card) 40'; Brown (yellow card) 63'; Berhalter (yellow card) 70'; Klomp 85' (o.g.); Veselinović (yellow card) 90+6'	Stadium: ATCO Field; Referee: Yusri Rudolf
	Penalties
	Bevan (penalty scored); Escalante (penalty scored); Simmons (penalty scored); Musse (penalty missed)		(penalty scored) Cavallini; (penalty scored) Caicedo; (penalty scored) Dájome; (penalty scored) Owusu; (penalty scored) Gutiérrez

June 22 Semi-finals	Whitecaps FC	2–1	York United	Vancouver, British Columbia
7:00 PM (PDT)	White 53', 73'	Report	Toussaint (yellow card) 22'; Johnston 84'	Stadium: BC Place; Attendance: 10,503; Referee: Juan Marquez

July 26 Final	Whitecaps FC	1–1 (5–3 p)	Toronto FC	Vancouver, British Columbia
7:30 PM (PDT)	White 19'	Report	Bradley (yellow card) 69'; MacNaughton 75'	Stadium: BC Place; Attendance: 24,307; Referee: Pierre-Luc Lauzière
	Penalties
	Gauld (penalty scored); White (penalty scored); Gressel (penalty scored); Cubas (penalty scored); Blackmon (penalty scored)		(penalty scored) Criscito; (penalty scored) Perruzza; (penalty missed) Osorio; (penalty scored) Bernardeschi

== Statistics ==
=== Appearances and goals ===
As of October 9, 2022

No.	Pos	Nat	Player	Total		MLS		Canadian Championship	
No.	Pos	Nat	Player	Apps	Goals	Apps	Goals	Apps	Goals
Goalkeepers
1	GK	(Canada) CAN	Thomas Hasal	17	0	17	0	0	0
50	GK	(Canada) CAN	Max Anchor	1	0	1	0	0	0
55	GK	(United States) USA	Cody Cropper	19	0	14+1	0	4	0
60	GK	(Canada) CAN	Isaac Boehmer	3	0	2+1	0	0	0
Defenders
2	DF	(Canada) CAN	Marcus Godinho	26	0	12+11	0	1+2	0
3	DF	(Canada) CAN	Cristián Gutiérrez	12	0	6+5	0	1	0
4	DF	(Serbia) SRB	Ranko Veselinović	34	1	31	1	3	0
6	DF	(United States) USA	Tristan Blackmon	29	1	23+5	1	1	0
14	DF	(Portugal) POR	Luís Martins	13	0	5+7	0	0+1	0
19	DF	(Germany) GER	Julian Gressel	14	2	11+2	2	0+1	0
23	DF	(Jamaica) JAM	Javain Brown	29	1	22+5	1	1+1	0
26	DF	(Germany) GER	Florian Jungwirth	15	0	10+3	0	2	0
28	DF	(United States) USA	Jake Nerwinski	27	0	20+4	0	3	0
Midfielders
15	MF	(Guinea-Bissau) GBS	Janio Bikel	0	0	0	0	0	0
16	MF	(United States) USA	Sebastian Berhalter	20	0	11+7	0	0+2	0
17	MF	(Ghana) GHA	Leonard Owusu	21	0	10+9	0	0+2	0
18	MF	(Austria) AUT	Alessandro Schöpf	7	0	5+2	0	0	0
20	MF	(Paraguay) PAR	Andrés Cubas	20	1	17+1	1	2	0
25	MF	(Scotland) SCO	Ryan Gauld	32	8	25+3	8	4	0
27	MF	(Canada) CAN	Ryan Raposo	34	3	17+13	2	4	1
31	MF	(Canada) CAN	Russell Teibert	33	1	24+5	0	4	1
33	MF	(Canada) CAN	Michael Baldisimo	16	0	4+9	0	2+1	0
45	MF	(Ecuador) ECU	Pedro Vite	25	2	14+10	2	0+1	0
Forwards
7	FW	(Colombia) COL	Déiber Caicedo	19	1	12+4	1	2+1	0
9	FW	(Canada) CAN	Lucas Cavallini	29	9	16+9	9	4	0
11	FW	(Colombia) COL	Cristian Dájome	30	2	17+9	2	2+2	0
24	FW	(United States) USA	Brian White	30	7	20+7	4	2+1	3
29	FW	(United States) USA	Simon Becher	1	1	0+1	1	0	0
43	FW	(Canada) CAN	Easton Ongaro	1	0	1	0	0	0
49	FW	(Mexico) MEX	Emiliano Brienza	1	0	0+1	0	0	0
51	FW	(Canada) CAN	Ali Ahmed	2	0	0+2	0	0	0
87	FW	(Canada) CAN	Tosaint Ricketts	26	4	2+21	4	0+3	0
Players transferred out during the season
8	MF	(Brazil) BRA	Caio Alexandre	5	0	0+4	0	0+1	0
22	DF	(Argentina) ARG	Érik Godoy	8	2	5+1	1	2	1
30	MF	(Canada) CAN	Kamron Habibullah	0	0	0	0	0	0
61	MF	(Canada) CAN	Matteo Campagna	0	0	0	0	0	0

Source: Competitions

=== Goalscorers ===
As of October 9, 2022

Rank	No.	Pos	Nat	Name	MLS	Canadian Championship	Total
1	9	FW	(Canada)	Lucas Cavallini	9	0	9
2	25	MF	(Scotland)	Ryan Gauld	8	0	8
3	24	FW	(United States)	Brian White	4	3	7
4	87	FW	(Canada)	Tosaint Ricketts	4	0	4
5	27	MF	(Canada)	Ryan Raposo	2	1	3
6	11	FW	(Colombia)	Cristian Dájome	2	0	2
6	19	DF	(Germany)	Julian Gressel	2	0	2
6	22	DF	(Argentina)	Érik Godoy	1	1	2
6	45	MF	(Ecuador)	Pedro Vite	2	0	2
10	4	DF	(Serbia)	Ranko Veselinović	1	0	1
10	6	DF	(United States)	Tristan Blackmon	1	0	1
10	7	FW	(Colombia)	Déiber Caicedo	1	0	1
10	20	MF	(Paraguay)	Andrés Cubas	1	0	1
10	23	DF	(Jamaica)	Javain Brown	1	0	1
10	29	FW	(United States)	Simon Becher	1	0	1
10	31	MF	(Canada)	Russell Teibert	0	1	1
Own goals					0	0	0
Totals					40	6	46

=== Clean sheets ===
As of October 9, 2022

Rank	No.	Pos	Nat	Name	MLS	Canadian Championship	Total
1	1	GK	(Canada)	Thomas Hasal	5	0	5
1	55	GK	(United States)	Cody Cropper	4	1	5
Totals					9	1	10

=== Disciplinary record ===
As of October 9, 2022

No.	Pos	Nat	Player	MLS			Canadian Championship			Total		
No.	Pos	Nat	Player	Yellow card	(yellow card) (yellow-red card)	Red card	Yellow card	(yellow card) (yellow-red card)	Red card	Yellow card	(yellow card) (yellow-red card)	Red card
1	GK	(Canada)	Thomas Hasal	0	0	0	0	0	0	0	0	0
2	DF	(Canada)	Marcus Godinho	1	0	0	0	0	0	1	0	0
3	DF	(Canada)	Cristián Gutiérrez	1	0	0	0	0	0	1	0	0
4	DF	(Serbia)	Ranko Veselinović	5	0	0	1	0	0	6	0	0
6	DF	(United States)	Tristan Blackmon	5	0	0	0	0	0	5	0	0
7	FW	(Colombia)	Déiber Caicedo	2	0	0	0	0	0	2	0	0
8	MF	(Brazil)	Caio Alexandre	2	0	0	0	0	0	2	0	0
9	FW	(Canada)	Lucas Cavallini	9	0	1	1	0	0	10	0	1
11	FW	(Colombia)	Cristian Dájome	3	1	0	0	0	0	3	1	0
14	DF	(Portugal)	Luís Martins	1	0	0	0	0	0	1	0	0
16	MF	(United States)	Sebastian Berhalter	5	0	0	1	0	0	6	0	0
17	MF	(Ghana)	Leonard Owusu	1	0	0	0	0	0	1	0	0
18	MF	(Austria)	Alessandro Schöpf	1	0	0	0	0	0	1	0	0
19	DF	(Germany)	Julian Gressel	1	0	0	0	0	0	1	0	0
20	MF	(Paraguay)	Andrés Cubas	2	0	0	0	0	0	2	0	0
22	DF	(Argentina)	Érik Godoy	1	0	0	0	0	0	1	0	0
23	DF	(Jamaica)	Javain Brown	4	0	0	1	0	0	5	0	0
24	FW	(United States)	Brian White	1	0	0	0	0	0	1	0	0
25	MF	(Scotland)	Ryan Gauld	6	0	0	0	0	0	6	0	0
26	DF	(Germany)	Florian Jungwirth	3	0	0	0	0	0	3	0	0
27	MF	(Canada)	Ryan Raposo	2	0	0	0	0	0	2	0	0
28	DF	(United States)	Jake Nerwinski	0	1	0	0	0	0	0	1	0
31	MF	(Canada)	Russell Teibert	5	0	0	0	0	0	5	0	0
33	MF	(Canada)	Michael Baldisimo	2	0	0	1	0	0	3	0	0
45	MF	(Ecuador)	Pedro Vite	2	0	0	0	0	0	2	0	0
49	FW	(Mexico)	Emiliano Brienza	0	0	0	0	0	0	0	0	0
55	GK	(United States)	Cody Cropper	0	0	0	0	0	0	0	0	0
60	GK	(Canada)	Isaac Boehmer	0	0	0	0	0	0	0	0	0
87	FW	(Canada)	Tosaint Ricketts	0	0	0	0	0	0	0	0	0
	MF	(Canada)	Matteo Campagna	0	0	0	0	0	0	0	0	0
	MF	(Canada)	Kamron Habibullah	0	0	0	0	0	0	0	0	0
Totals				65	2	1	5	0	0	70	2	1
