= Isaac Boehmer =

Canadian soccer player (born 2001)

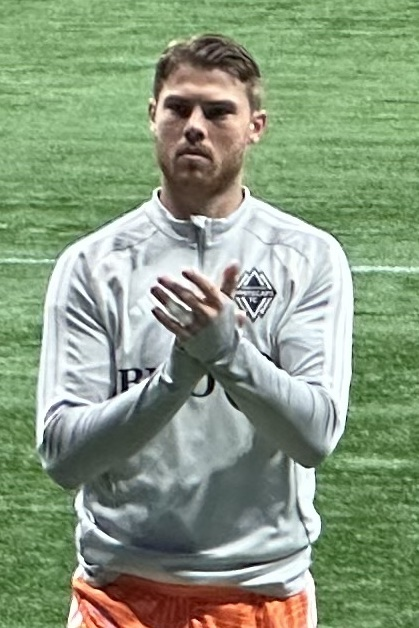
- Boehmer in 2026

Personal information
- Date of birth: November 20, 2001 (age 24)
- Place of birth: Penticton, British Columbia, Canada
- Height: 1.88 m (6 ft 2 in)
- Position: Goalkeeper

Team information
- Current team: Vancouver Whitecaps FC
- Number: 32

Youth career
- Pinnacles FC
- Thompson Okanagan FC
- 2018–2020: Vancouver Whitecaps FC

Senior career*
Years	Team	Apps	(Gls)
2020–	Vancouver Whitecaps FC	6	(0)
2021	→ Pacific FC (loan)	1	(0)
2022–	→ Whitecaps FC 2 (loan)	35	(0)
- * Club domestic league appearances and goals as of August 4, 2026

Isaac Boehmer (born November 20, 2001) is a Canadian soccer player who plays as a goalkeeper for Major League Soccer club Vancouver Whitecaps FC.

== Early life ==
Boehmer began playing youth soccer with Pinnacles FC. He later played with Thompson Okanagan FC, while also training at the Vancouver Whitecaps Okanagan Academy Centre. He also participated in a Whitecaps Pre-Residency combine in 2014. In February 2016, he had a training stint with the youth system of German club FC Schalke 04. In September 2018, he officially joined the Vancouver Whitecaps Academy. He was invited to the first team's training camp, ahead of the 2020 season.

== Club career ==
In August 2020, Boehmer signed a homegrown player contract with Vancouver Whitecaps FC of Major League Soccer. In September 2021, he was loaned to Pacific FC of the Canadian Premier League. He made his professional debut for Pacific on October 30, 2021 against York United. After the 2021 season, his option for 2022 was declined, but he was invited to the club's pre-season ahead of the 2022 season. In February 2022, he signed an extension with the Whitecaps for the 2022 season, with club options through the 2025 season. He made his MLS debut on July 13, 2022 against FC Cincinnati, coming on as a half-time substitute following an injury to starting keeper Cody Cropper, and did not concede a goal He made his first start, four days late, on July 17, in a 1-1 draw with the Portland Timbers, only conceding a goal on a penalty kick and earned MLS Team of the Week honours for his performance. He has also spent some time playing with the second team, Whitecaps FC 2, in MLS Next Pro.

Boehmer started for the Vancouver Whitecaps against Toronto FC in the 2024 Canadian Championship final, where he saved two penalty kicks, one in the first half from Federico Bernardeschi, and one during the penalty shootout from Kosi Thompson. Vancouver won the penalty shootout, and Boehmer received both the Best Young Canadian Player award, and the George Gross Memorial Trophy.

== International career ==
Born in Canada, Boehmer is of German descent and has dual citizenship. In February 2016, he was invited to an identification camp for the Canada U15 team, but was unable to attend as he was at a training stint in Germany with the Schalke 04 youth academy.

== Career statistics ==
As of match played September 16, 2026

Club	Season	League			Playoffs		Domestic Cup		Continental		Other		Total	
Club	Season	Division	Apps	Goals	Apps	Goals	Apps	Goals	Apps	Goals	Apps	Goals	Apps	Goals
Vancouver Whitecaps FC	2020	Major League Soccer	0	0	–		–		–		0	0	0	0
Vancouver Whitecaps FC	2021	Major League Soccer	0	0	0	0	0	0	–		–		0	0
Vancouver Whitecaps FC	2022	Major League Soccer	3	0	–		0	0	–		–		3	0
Vancouver Whitecaps FC	2023	Major League Soccer	0	0	0	0	0	0	0	0	1	0	1	0
Vancouver Whitecaps FC	2024	Major League Soccer	1	0	0	0	5	0	0	0	1	0	7	0
Vancouver Whitecaps FC	2025	Major League Soccer	0	0	0	0	5	0	2	0	0	0	7	0
Vancouver Whitecaps FC	2026	Major League Soccer	2	0	0	0	4	0	0	0	3	0	9	0
Vancouver Whitecaps FC	Total		6	0	0	0	14	0	2	0	5	0	27	0
Pacific FC (loan)	2021	Canadian Premier League	1	0	0	0	0	0	–		–		1	0
Whitecaps FC 2 (loan)	2022	MLS Next Pro	10	0	–		–		–		–		10	0
Whitecaps FC 2 (loan)	2023	MLS Next Pro	9	0	–		–		–		–		9	0
Whitecaps FC 2 (loan)	2024	MLS Next Pro	5	0	–		–		–		–		5	0
Whitecaps FC 2 (loan)	2025	MLS Next Pro	6	0	–		–		–		–		6	0
Whitecaps FC 2 (loan)	2026	MLS Next Pro	5	0	–		–		–		–		5	0
Whitecaps FC 2 (loan)	Total		35	0	0	0	0	0	0	0	0	0	35	0
Career total			42	0	0	0	14	0	2	0	5	0	63	0

== Honours ==
Vancouver Whitecaps FC

- Canadian Championship: 2024

Individual

- George Gross Memorial Trophy: 2024
- Canadian Championship Best Young Canadian Player: 2024
