= Emiliano Brienza =

Mexican footballer (born 2002)

Personal information
- Full name: Emiliano Díaz Brienza
- Date of birth: 9 May 2002 (age 24)
- Place of birth: Puerto Vallarta, Mexico
- Height: 1.78 m (5 ft 10 in)
- Position: Forward

Youth career
- –2018: Mountain United FC
- 2018–2022: Vancouver Whitecaps FC

Senior career*
| Years | Team | Apps | (Gls) |
| 2022 | Whitecaps FC 2 | 21 | (4) |
| 2022 | → Vancouver Whitecaps FC (loan) | 1 | (0) |
| 2024 | Burnaby FC | 4 | (2) |
- * Club domestic league appearances and goals as of August 8, 2024

Emiliano Díaz Brienza (born 9 May 2002) is a Mexican professional footballer who plays as a forward.

== Early life ==
Brienza was born in Puerto Vallarta, Mexico, with his family moving to Coquitlam, British Columbia in Canada in 2015 when he was 13-years old. He was part of the Mountain United FC team at club level before joining the Whitecaps FC Academy in September 2018. In 2019, Brienza started 18 matches with the under-17 team, including three playoff matches, scoring six goals. He also made three appearances with the under-19 team

== Club career ==
On 25 February 2022, it was announced that Brienza had signed with Whitecaps FC 2, Vancouver's reserve team who would compete in the newly formed MLS Next Pro. It was also announced he would join the Vancouver Whitecaps FC MLS roster on a short-term deal. On 26 February, Brienza made his professional debut, appearing as an 88th-minute substitute during a 4–0 loss to Columbus Crew on the opening game of the season.

== International career ==
Brienza was first called up to a Canada under-17 national camp for the 2019 FIFA U-17 World Cup. He appeared on the bench for three matches without making an appearance.

== Career statistics ==
As of 26 February 2022

Appearances and goals by club, season and competition
| Club | League | Season | League | | Playoffs | | Domestic Cup | | Continental | | Total | |
| Club | League | Season | Apps | Goals | Apps | Goals | Apps | Goals | Apps | Goals | Apps | Goals |
|---|---|---|---|---|---|---|---|---|---|---|---|---|
| Vancouver Whitecaps FC | MLS | 2022 | 1 | 0 | 0 | 0 | 0 | 0 | – | | 1 | 0 |
| Career total | | | 1 | 0 | 0 | 0 | 0 | 0 | 0 | 0 | 1 | 0 |
