= George Gross Memorial Trophy =

Award given to the most valuable player of the Canadian Championship

- MVP award of the Canadian Championship
- Country: Canada
- Presented by: Canada Soccer
- First award: 2008; 18 years ago
- Current holder: (Democratic Republic of the Congo) Dimitry Bertaud (1st award)

Highlights
- Most awards: (Canada) Dwayne De Rosario (United States) Justin Mapp (2 awards each)

The George Gross Memorial Trophy is awarded to the most valuable player of the Canadian Championship. It is named after George Gross, a highly respected sports journalist who covered soccer for the Toronto Telegram and Toronto Sun.

The inaugural recipient of the award was Matt Jordan of the Montreal Impact, who was named MVP of the 2008 Canadian Championship after posting two clean sheets and only allowing two goals in four games, en route to Montreal's tournament victory.

Dwayne De Rosario became the first Canadian winner in 2009 after scoring three goals in a 6–1 Toronto FC victory over Montreal in the final game of that year's tournament. De Rosario then became the first repeat winner in 2010.

Montreal Impact's Justin Mapp was awarded the trophy in 2013, becoming the first non-Toronto FC player since 2008, and the first winner of the MLS version of Montreal. Mapp became the second repeat winner during the 2014 tournament.

In 2024, Isaac Boehmer of the Vancouver Whitecaps became the first player to win both the Best Young Canadian Player award and the George Gross Memorial Trophy in the same season.

As of 2026, it has only ever been won by players whose team won the championship that season.

== Winners ==
Year	Player	Position	Nationality	Team
2008	Matt Jordan	Goalkeeper	United States	Montreal Impact
2009	Dwayne De Rosario	Attacking midfielder	Canada	Toronto FC
2010	Dwayne De Rosario	Midfielder	Canada	Toronto FC
2011	Joao Plata	Forward	Ecuador	Toronto FC
2012	Ryan Johnson	Forward	Jamaica	Toronto FC
2013	Justin Mapp	Left winger	United States	Montreal Impact
2014	Justin Mapp	Left winger	United States	Montreal Impact
2015	Russell Teibert	Midfielder	Canada	Vancouver Whitecaps FC
2016	Benoît Cheyrou	Midfielder	France	Toronto FC
2017	Sebastian Giovinco	Forward	Italy	Toronto FC
2018	Jonathan Osorio	Midfielder	Canada	Toronto FC
2019	Ignacio Piatti	Winger	Argentina	Montreal Impact
2020	Not awarded (Note: Although the trophy wasn't awarded at the conclusion of the 2020 Canadian Championship, Canada Soccer named Forge FC's Tristan Borges the performer of the match of the final, the only match played in that year's tournament.)			
2021	Sebastian Breza	Goalkeeper	Canada	CF Montréal
2022	Ryan Gauld	Attacking midfielder	Scotland	Vancouver Whitecaps FC
2023	Julian Gressel	Full-back	United States (Note: Julian Gressel was born in Germany but represented the United States in international soccer.)	Vancouver Whitecaps FC
2024	Isaac Boehmer	Goalkeeper	Canada	Vancouver Whitecaps FC
2025	Ali Ahmed	Midfielder	Canada	Vancouver Whitecaps FC
2026	Dimitry Bertaud	Goalkeeper	DR Congo (Note: Dimitry Bertaud was born in France but represented DR Congo in international soccer.)	Forge FC

== Winners by club ==
Team	No. of wins
Toronto FC	7
CF Montréal	5 (Note: Includes the award won by Matt Jordan while playing for the previous incarnation of the Montreal Impact.)
Vancouver Whitecaps FC	5
Forge FC	1

== Winners by nationality ==
Team	No. of wins
Canada	7
United States	4 (Note: Includes Julian Gressel's 2023 award, as he represented the United States in international soccer despite being born in Germany.)
Argentina	1
DR Congo	1 (Note: Includes Dimitry Bertaud's 2026 award, as he represented DR Congo in international soccer despite being born in France.)
Ecuador	1
France	1
Italy	1
Jamaica	1
Scotland	1
Non-Canadian total	11
