= Ryan Gauld =

Scottish footballer (born 1995)

Personal information
- Full name: Ryan Stewart Gauld
- Date of birth: 16 December 1995 (age 30)
- Place of birth: Aberdeen, Scotland
- Height: 5 ft 6 in (1.68 m)
- Position: Attacking midfielder

Team information
- Current team: Vancouver Whitecaps FC
- Number: 25

Youth career
- 2003–2006: Brechin City Boys Club
- 2006–2012: Dundee United

Senior career*
Years	Team	Apps	(Gls)
2012–2014	Dundee United	42	(7)
2014–2019	Sporting CP B	73	(8)
2014–2019	Sporting CP	2	(0)
2016–2017	→ Vitória de Setúbal (loan)	5	(0)
2017–2018	→ Aves (loan)	18	(1)
2018–2019	→ Farense (loan)	12	(2)
2019	→ Hibernian (loan)	5	(0)
2019–2021	Farense	54	(18)
2021–	Vancouver Whitecaps FC	134	(40)

International career^{‡}
2012–2014	Scotland U19	10	(2)
2013–2016	Scotland U21	11	(2)
2024–	Scotland	6	(0)
- * Club domestic league appearances and goals as of 13:52, 12 November 2026 (UTC) ‡ National team caps and goals as of 18 November 2024

Ryan Stewart Gauld (born 16 December 1995) is a Scottish professional footballer who plays as an attacking midfielder for Major League Soccer club Vancouver Whitecaps FC, whom he captains, and the Scotland national team.

Gauld began his professional career at Dundee United, where he helped them reach the 2014 Scottish Cup final, and his abilities on the ball earned comparisons to Lionel Messi from the Scottish media. In July 2014, he transferred to Portuguese club Sporting CP for a fee of around £3 million. Gauld mainly appeared for the club's B team, and was also loaned to Vitória de Setúbal, Aves, Farense and Hibernian. In July 2019, Gauld moved to Farense on a permanent basis, winning promotion in his first season and scoring nine goals in each of his two years. In July 2021, he signed for MLS club Vancouver Whitecaps, where he won the Canadian Championship in 2022, 2023, 2024 and 2025.

Gauld represented Scotland at under-19 and under-21 levels. He made his debut for the senior team in September 2024, a decade after first being called up.

== Early life ==
Gauld grew up in Laurencekirk, Aberdeenshire, where he attended Laurencekirk Primary before becoming a pupil at Mearns Academy.

In 2002, Gauld began to play for Brechin City Boys Club (now renamed Brechin City Youths), where he was part of a successful team alongside John Souttar and Euan Spark. The trio also developed their skills at coaching schools run in Dundee by Ian Cathro, before they all joined Dundee United's youth system in 2006 at the age of nine.

== Club career ==
=== Dundee United ===
He's a talent. He's one of a conveyor belt of young players that we need to breed and need to bring on. He can go past people as if they're not there.

— Dundee United manager Peter Houston praising 16-year-old Gauld in September 2012.

Gauld made his Scottish Premier League debut as a 16-year-old, as an 87th-minute substitute for Johnny Russell in the final match of the 2011–12 season, a 2–0 win away to Motherwell on 13 May.

On 24 January 2013, Gauld signed an extended contract keeping him at the club until January 2016. Later on in the 2012–13 season, on 1 April, he made his first start against St Johnstone at McDiarmid Park and marked the occasion with his first senior goal to open a game which ended 1–1.

On 4 November 2013, during the 2013–14 season, Gauld's contract was further extended, to run until May 2016. Five days later, he scored twice in a 4–0 win against Motherwell at Fir Park. On 15 December 2013, the Daily Record reported that Manchester United's Scottish manager David Moyes wanted to personally "scout" Gauld, and take the opportunity to run the rule over the potential of other young Dundee United players such as defenders John Souttar and Andrew Robertson. However, the following day, also his 18th birthday, Gauld's contract was further extended until May 2017. Around the same time, he was being tracked by English Premier League pair Everton and Liverpool, Italy's Roma and Spain's Real Madrid.

On 12 April 2014, Gauld played in the Scottish Cup semi-final at Ibrox, as United defeated Rangers 3–1 to advance to the Final. He made the run into the penalty area from which Stuart Armstrong scored the opening goal, and assisted the second from Gary Mackay-Steven. Five days later, he was shortlisted for the PFA Scotland Young Player of the Year award, which was eventually awarded to his teammate Robertson. In the Cup Final on 17 May, Gauld replaced Mackay-Steven for the final 26 minutes as Dundee United lost 2–0 to St Johnstone at Celtic Park. Gauld's season ended with eight goals in 38 games across all competitions, of which six were scored in his 31 league matches.

=== Sporting CP ===
On 2 July 2014, Sporting CP announced the signing of Gauld from Dundee United, for an undisclosed fee rumoured to be in the region of £3 million. He signed a six-year contract with a €60 million buy-out clause. He credited Sporting's track record of developing players such as Luís Figo, Cristiano Ronaldo and Nani for his decision to join them. Despite being put into the club's B-team, Gauld was named in the 25-man squad to play in the UEFA Champions League after impressing manager Marco Silva during training sessions.

He made his debut for Sporting B on 10 August 2014, replacing João Palhinha at half time in a 1–0 defeat away to Farense. Seventeen days later, in his fourth match for the club, he scored for the first time, netting the second in a 3–0 home victory over Aves. On 7 December, he scored a second goal, opening a 4–3 win at Lisbon neighbours Oriental with a 20-yard volley. On 21 December, he was sent off for two bookings in a 3–1 triumph at Vitória de Guimarães B. He finished the season with three goals from 26 games for the B-team, the third coming on 7 February 2015, when he equalised as the team came from behind to win 2–1 against Olhanense.

Gauld made his debut for the first team on 29 December 2014 in a Taça da Liga game against Vitória de Guimarães, playing the full 90 minutes in a 2–0 win. On his second start for the Sporting first team on 14 January 2015, Gauld was named man of the match in a 1–0 win in the same competition, against Boavista. Having been fouled by goalkeeper Daniel Monllor, he won the penalty converted by Junya Tanaka for the only goal. Four days later, he made his Primeira Liga debut, replacing André Martins for the last 25 minutes of a 4–2 win over Rio Ave at the Estádio José Alvalade. Gauld scored twice for the first team in a 3–2 defeat away to neighbours Belenenses in a Taça da Liga group game on 21 January.

In his second season in the Portuguese capital, Gauld scored his first goal of the B-team's campaign on 26 August 2015, the only one of the away match at Covilhã in the 84th minute. He followed this on 12 September with a strike in a 4–0 triumph at Oriental. Gauld matched his goal tally in Segunda Liga from the previous season on 3 October, when he opened a 1–1 draw at Famalicão, and succeeded it on 28 November with his fourth goal of the campaign, assuring the same result at Gil Vicente

==== Loans ====
On 20 July 2016, amidst interest from England's Sheffield Wednesday, Gauld was loaned to Portuguese top-flight team Vitória de Setúbal for the upcoming season, alongside his teammate André Geraldes. He made his debut for Vitória on 26 October 2016 in a Taça da Liga tie against lower-league Santa Clara, playing the full 90 minutes in a 2–0 win. He made his league debut three days later, coming on as a late substitute for Nenê Bonilha in a scoreless draw at home to Porto, his first game in Primeira Liga for 20 months.

On 5 January 2017, it was reported that Gauld had been recalled from loan to train with Sporting B, due to Sporting being eliminated from the Taça da Liga by Vitória in controversial circumstances. He played nine second-tier games for the B-team over the rest of the season, and was sent off on 14 May at the end of a 2–1 home loss to Académica de Coimbra.

On 24 July 2017, Gauld was loaned to Primeira Liga newcomers Aves. He was unable to play against his parent team on the first day of the season, however, he came on as an added-time substitute for Salvador Agra in the next game, a 2–2 draw with Paços de Ferreira on 13 August. In his fourth match on 11 September, he scored his first goal in Portugal's top flight, the winner in a 2–1 home win over Belenenses.

On 31 August 2018, Gauld joined LigaPro side Farense on a season-long loan. He scored his only goals for the Algarve club on 30 December, in a 5–0 home win over Oliveirense. The loan was curtailed in January 2019 and he was then loaned to Scottish Premiership club Hibernian. Gauld suffered a hamstring injury and consequently only collected 371 minutes of game time from six first team games in his half-season loan at Easter Road.

=== Farense ===
Gauld left Sporting to rejoin Farense on a permanent basis in July 2019, signing a two-year contract with an option for a third year and a €4 million release clause. On 29 February 2020, he scored his first career hat-trick in a 3–1 win over Académico de Viseu to put his team top of the second division; this concluded a run of six goals from seven games. Farense were granted promotion to the first division following the stoppage of the Portuguese second tier due to the COVID-19 pandemic. Gauld finished the season as the team's top scorer and was voted as the top player in the Portuguese second tier. In the 2020–21 Primeira Liga, Farense were immediately relegated back, with Gauld their top scorer with another 9 goals.

=== Vancouver Whitecaps FC ===
On 31 July 2021, Gauld signed with Major League Soccer side Vancouver Whitecaps FC on a three-and-a-half-year deal, becoming one of the club's Designated Players. He scored his first goal for the Whitecaps on 21 August 2021 against Los Angeles FC, an 89th-minute winner. In July 2022, he helped the Whitecaps win the Canadian Championship and was awarded the George Gross Memorial Trophy as the tournament's MVP. His figures for the 2022 Major League Soccer season were eight goals and nine assists, while the Whitecaps missed the playoffs.

Vancouver retained the Canadian Championship in 2023, with Gauld scoring the decisive goal from the penalty spot in a 2–1 final win over Montréal at BC Place on 7 June 2023. Nineteen days later, Gauld was named MLS Player of the Matchday for Week 21 of the 2023 season, for recording a goal and two assists against Los Angeles. In November 2023, he was voted Whitecaps Player of the Season for the second consecutive year.

On 25 January 2024, Gauld signed a three-year contract extension with the Whitecaps. On 23 February 2024, Gauld was named the 25th club captain in Whitecaps history, replacing Russell Teibert. On 23 October, Gauld scored a hat-trick and assisted another goal in a 5–0 win over Portland Timbers in the MLS playoffs wild card round. On 9 March 2025, he sustained a knee injury during a match against CF Montréal. In January 2026, it was announced that Gauld would miss the beginning of the 2026 season due to a knee procedure. After more than a year on the sidelines, he returned to action on 8 July 2026, helping his side to a 4–1 victory over Cavalry FC in the first leg of the Canadian Championship quarter-finals. Later that month, on 22 July, he recorded his 100th goal contribution for the club by scoring twice in a 4–3 away defeat to FC Cincinnati.

== International career ==
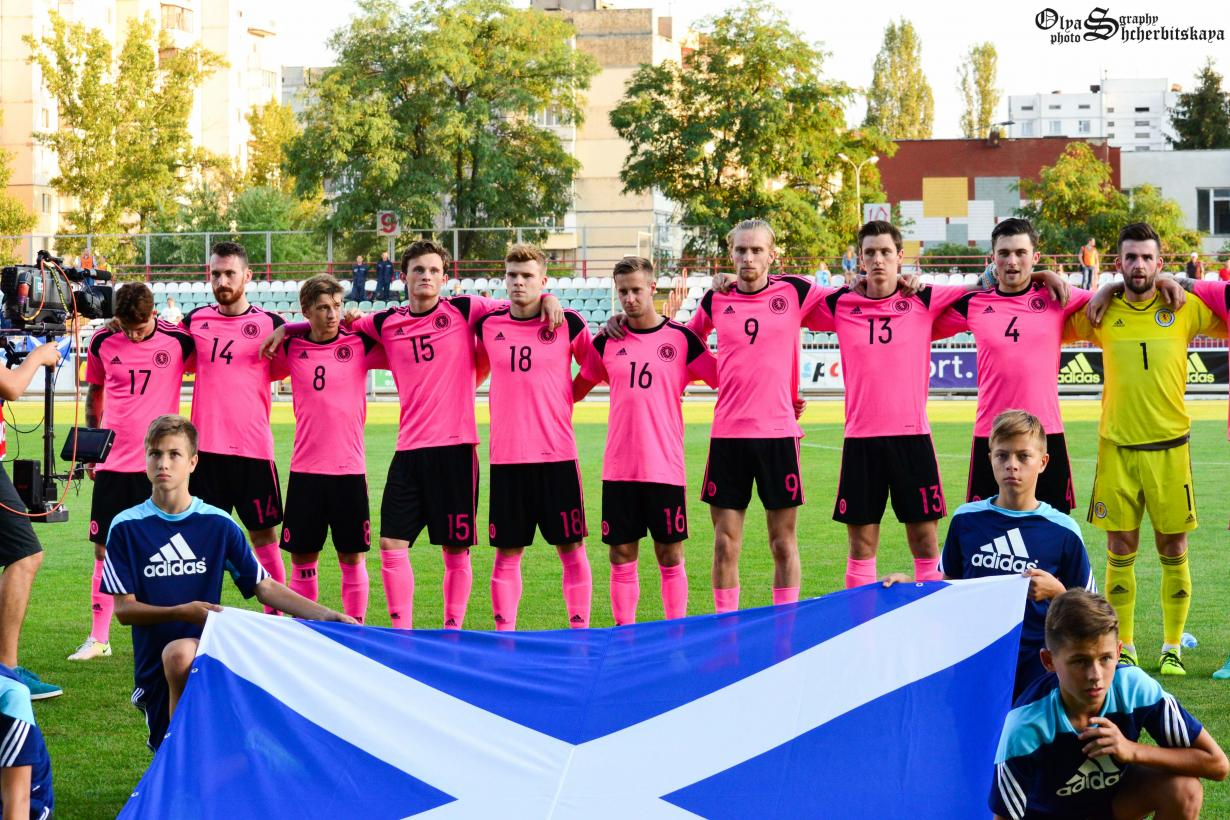
Gauld (No 8) with Scotland U21s in Ukraine, 2016

Gauld was capped 10 times for Scotland at under-19 level, scoring two goals. He made his debut on 9 October 2012 against Armenia, replacing Matty Kennedy after 66 minutes of an eventual 4–0 win in a European qualifier at New Douglas Park in Hamilton. He scored his first goal on his fourth cap on 3 September 2013, against Iceland at the Forthbank Stadium in Stirling, a 20-yard free kick to equalise in a 1–1 draw.

Gauld scored two goals in 11 appearances for the under-21 team. On 6 November 2013, he was called into the under-21 squad for the first time, for the match against Georgia later that month. He scored his first goals for the under-21 team on his third cap on 8 September 2014, a brace in a 3–0 win away to Luxembourg at the Stade Municipal de Differdange, at the end of a failed European qualification campaign. On 30 September 2014, Gauld was called up to the senior Scotland national football team for Euro 2016 Group D qualifying matches against Georgia and Poland, but did not play. On 10 October 2015, Gauld was sent off for a foul on Marcus Coco in a 2–1 2017 UEFA European Under-21 Championship qualification loss to France at Pittodrie in his hometown.

In October 2022, Gauld admitted that he had pretty much given up hope of being called up to the Scotland squad again. "It's genuinely not something I think about now," he told MailSport. "A year or two ago, when I thought I was doing really well at Farense, I felt it might happen. But I'm at a stage now where it doesn't enter my mind. When there's an international break I'm looking at having a few days off and going somewhere nice in Canada with my missus." He later claimed that he could instead play for Canada, for which he would qualify through residency rules.

In August 2024, it was announced that Gauld had been invited to join the Scotland squad for its upcoming UEFA Nations League matches against Poland and Portugal in September 2024, for his first call-up in a decade. He made his debut on 5 September 2024 in a game against Poland at Hampden Park, coming on for Ryan Christie in the 71st minute as Poland won 3–2. In the subsequent fixtures against Croatia and Portugal, Gauld again came on as a substitute, playing on the same team as childhood companion John Souttar for the first time since their Dundee United spell in 2014.

== Style of play ==
In times of trouble, mediocre prospects are routinely heralded above their actual level of ability. Glasgow pubs, let alone Scotland's amateur leagues, are filled with individuals once tipped as the latter-day Denis Law or Kenny Dalglish. Yet in the case of Gauld, the hype seems justified. Time spent in the teenager's company illustrates that the level-headed young Scot is capable of dealing with it.

— Ewan Murray, of The Observer, on Gauld in December 2013

Gauld's ability on the ball, and his small and slight stature, led him to be compared to Lionel Messi, a comparison made by the British press since 2013 which led to his nickname the Scottish Messi. At Dundee United, he was tutored by Ian Cathro, who favoured creativity and passing over the physicality often expected in Scottish football. After his transfer to Sporting, BBC Sport columnist Richard Wilson predicted that Gauld would be better suited to the style of football in Portugal, due to its slower tempo and its concentration on a passing game. Gauld himself has spoken of his preference for Portuguese football over its Scottish equivalent, and expressed relief at the lower media interest in him at Sporting, opining that comparisons with Messi were exaggerated and premature.

== Career statistics ==
=== Club ===
As of match played 7 November 2026

Appearances and goals by club, season and competition
Club	Season	League			National cup		League cup		Continental		Other		Total	
Club	Season	Division	Apps	Goals	Apps	Goals	Apps	Goals	Apps	Goals	Apps	Goals	Apps	Goals
Dundee United	2011–12	Scottish Premier League	1	0	0	0	0	0	0	0	—		1	0
Dundee United	2012–13	Scottish Premier League	10	1	1	0	0	0	0	0	—		11	1
Dundee United	2013–14	Scottish Premiership	31	6	4	1	3	1	—		—		38	8
Dundee United	Total		42	7	5	1	3	1	0	0	—		50	9
Sporting CP B	2014–15	Segunda Liga	26	3	—		—		—		—		26	3
Sporting CP B	2015–16	LigaPro	38	5	—		—		—		—		38	5
Sporting CP B	2016–17	LigaPro	9	0	—		—		—		—		9	0
Sporting CP B	Total		73	8	—		—		—		—		73	8
Sporting CP	2014–15	Primeira Liga	2	0	0	0	3	2	0	0	—		5	2
Vitória de Setúbal (loan)	2016–17	Primeira Liga	5	0	3	0	2	0	—		—		10	0
Aves (loan)	2017–18	Primeira Liga	18	1	4	0	1	0	—		—		23	1
Farense (loan)	2018–19	LigaPro	12	2	1	0	—		—		—		13	2
Hibernian (loan)	2018–19	Scottish Premiership	5	0	1	0	—		—		—		6	0
Farense	2019–20	LigaPro	21	9	3	0	0	0	—		—		24	9
Farense	2020–21	Primeira Liga	33	9	1	0	—		—		—		34	9
Farense	Total		54	18	4	0	0	0	—		—		58	18
Vancouver Whitecaps	2021	Major League Soccer	18	4	1	2	—		—		1 (Note: Appearance(s) in MLS Cup playoffs)	0	20	6
Vancouver Whitecaps	2022	Major League Soccer	28	8	4	0	—		—		—		32	8
Vancouver Whitecaps	2023	Major League Soccer	32	11	2	1	—		3 (Note: Appearances in CONCACAF Champions League/Cup)	0	5 (Note: Three appearances in Leagues Cup, two appearances in MLS Cup playoffs)	0	42	12
Vancouver Whitecaps	2024	Major League Soccer	30	10	5	2	—		2	0	4	5	41	17
Vancouver Whitecaps	2025	Major League Soccer	6	1	1	1	—		3	1	5	0	15	3
Vancouver Whitecaps	2026	Major League Soccer	20	6	4	1	—		0	0	2 (Note: Appearances in Leagues Cup)	0	26	7
Vancouver Whitecaps	Total		134	40	17	7	—		8	1	17	5	176	53
Career total			345	76	35	8	9	3	8	1	17	5	414	93

=== International ===
As of match played 18 November 2024

Appearances and goals by national team and year
National team	Year	Apps	Goals
Scotland	2024	6	0
Total		6	0

== Honours ==
Aves

- Taça de Portugal: 2017–18

Vancouver Whitecaps

- Canadian Championship: 2022, 2023, 2024, 2025

Individual

- George Gross Memorial Trophy: 2022
- Primeira Liga Goal of the Month: February 2021
- MLS All-Star: 2024
