= Max Anchor =

Italian-Canadian soccer player

Personal information
- Date of birth: July 21, 2004 (age 22)
- Place of birth: Surrey, British Columbia, Canada
- Height: 6 ft 4 in (1.93 m)
- Position: Goalkeeper

Team information
- Current team: Seattle Sounders FC
- Number: 50

Youth career
- Coquitlam Metro-Ford SC
- Mountain United FC
- 2016–2022: Vancouver Whitecaps FC

Senior career*
Years	Team	Apps	(Gls)
2022	Whitecaps FC 2	5	(0)
2022	→ Vancouver Whitecaps FC (loan)	1	(0)
2023–2025	Vancouver Whitecaps FC	0	(0)
2023–2025	→ Whitecaps FC 2 (loan)	32	(0)
2025	→ Pacific FC (loan)	9	(0)
2025	→ Whitecaps FC 2 (loan)	4	(0)
2026–	Seattle Sounders FC	0	(0)
2026–	→ Tacoma Defiance (loan)	8	(0)

International career^{‡}
2019	Canada U15	1	(0)
2022	Canada U20	1	(0)
- * Club domestic league appearances and goals as of June 10, 2026 ‡ National team caps and goals as of January 23, 2024

Max Anchor (born July 21, 2004) is an Italian-Canadian professional soccer player who plays as a goalkeeper for Seattle Sounders FC in Major League Soccer.

== Early life ==
Anchor began playing youth soccer at age 4 with Coquitlam Metro-Ford SC. He later played with Mountain United FC, before joining the Vancouver Whitecaps FC Academy in 2016 as a 12 year old. He was named the Whitecaps 2021 Male Academy Player of the Year. In October 2025, Anchor obtained Italian citizenship through descent, based on his paternal family lineage. As a result, he holds both Canadian and Italian citizenship.

== Club career ==
Ahead of the 2022 season, Anchor attended the full pre-season with Major League Soccer club Vancouver Whitecaps FC. On May 21, 2022, Anchor signed a professional contract with the second team Whitecaps FC 2 of MLS Next Pro. On the same day, he was signed to a short-term loan with the first team, as the team's goalkeepers were all unavailable due to injury and health-and-safety protocols. In addition, he also signed a pre-contract to join the first team for the 2023 season as a homegrown player. He made his professional debut the next day against Charlotte FC, becoming the second-youngest goalkeeper to start an MLS game. After the match, he joined the second team, going on to make five appearances that season in MLS Next Pro.

In March 2025, Anchor was loaned to Canadian Premier League club Pacific FC for the 2025 season. He made his debut on April 5, 2025, keeping a clean sheet in a 2-0 victory over Valour FC. In September 2025, the Whitecaps recalled Anchor from his loan.

In December 2025, after having his option declined by the Whitecaps, he was claimed off of Year-End Waivers by Seattle Sounders FC to obtain his MLS rights. Shortly after, he then signed a one-year contract with Seattle, with options through the 2027–28 season. Anchor made several starts for the Tacoma Defiance, the reserve team for the Sounders in MLS Next Pro. During the 2026 FIFA World Cup, he trained with the Belgium national team during their sessions at the Providence Swedish Performance Center & Clubhouse, the Sounders training center that hosted Belgium. Anchor served as the fourth goalkeeper on their roster to allow for training in pairs.

== International career ==
In July 2019, Anchor was called up to the Canada U15 team for the 2019 CONCACAF Boys' Under-15 Championship.

In April 2022, Anchor was called to a camp for the Canada U20 team.

== Career statistics ==
As of match played October 19, 2025

Appearances and goals by club, season and competition
Club	Season	League			Playoffs		National Cup		Continental		Total	
Club	Season	Division	Apps	Goals	Apps	Goals	Apps	Goals	Apps	Goals	Apps	Goals
Whitecaps FC 2	2022	MLS Next Pro	5	0	—		—		—		5	0
Vancouver Whitecaps FC (loan)	2022	MLS	1	0	0	0	0	0	—		1	0
Vancouver Whitecaps FC	2023	MLS	0	0	0	0	0	0	—		0	0
Vancouver Whitecaps FC	2024	MLS	0	0	0	0	0	0	0	0	0	0
Vancouver Whitecaps FC	Total		31	0	1	0	0	0	0	0	32	0
Whitecaps FC 2 (loan)	2023	MLS Next Pro	14	0	—		—		—		14	0
Whitecaps FC 2 (loan)	2024	MLS Next Pro	17	0	1	0	—		—		18	0
Whitecaps FC 2 (loan)	2025	MLS Next Pro	1	0	0	0	—		—		1	0
Whitecaps FC 2 (loan)	Total		32	0	1	0	—		—		33	0
Pacific FC (loan)	2025	Canadian Premier League	9	0	—		1	0	—		10	0
Whitecaps FC 2 (loan)	2025	MLS Next Pro	4	0	1	0	—		—		5	0
Career total			51	0	2	0	1	0	0	0	54	0
