= Ranko Veselinović =

Serbian footballer (born 1999)

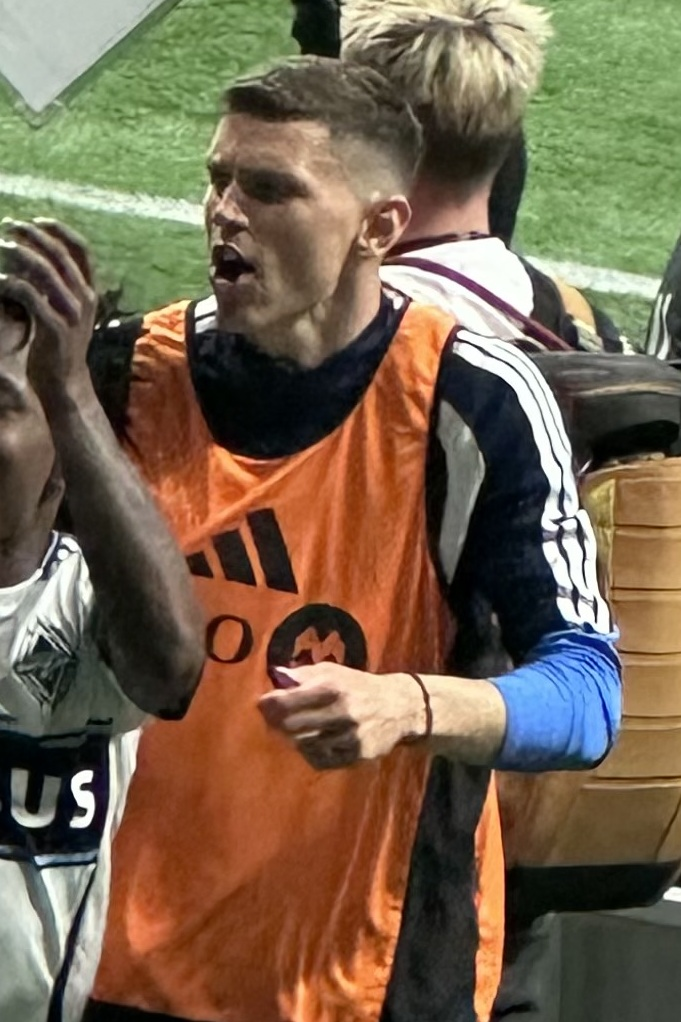
- Veselinović in 2026

Personal information
- Date of birth: 24 March 1999 (age 27)
- Place of birth: Novi Sad, FR Yugoslavia
- Height: 1.89 m (6 ft 2 in)
- Position: Centre-back

Team information
- Current team: Vancouver Whitecaps FC
- Number: 4

Youth career
- 2011–2017: Vojvodina

Senior career*
Years	Team	Apps	(Gls)
2016–2020	Vojvodina	59	(1)
2020	→ Vancouver Whitecaps FC (loan)	19	(0)
2021–	Vancouver Whitecaps FC	162	(6)
2026–	Whitecaps FC 2	1	(0)

International career^{‡}
2014–2015	Serbia U16	14	(1)
2015–2016	Serbia U17	15	(2)
2016–2017	Serbia U18	7	(0)
2017–2018	Serbia U19	10	(0)
2017–2019	Serbia U21	3	(0)
2021–	Serbia	2	(0)
- * Club domestic league appearances and goals as of 31 December 2025 ‡ National team caps and goals as of 26 January 2023

Ranko Veselinović (Serbian Cyrillic: Ранко Веселиновић; born 24 March 1999) is a Serbian professional footballer who plays as a centre-back for Major League Soccer club Vancouver Whitecaps FC.

== Club career ==
=== Vojvodina ===
Born in Novi Sad, Veselinović came through the Vojvodina youth academy, as a captain of the generation. In summer 2016, Veselinović signed a three-year scholarship contract. He joined the first team during the 2016–17 Serbian SuperLiga campaign at the age of 17 but missed to make any official appearance until the end of season. At the beginning of new season, Veselinović converted his squad number taking 33 jersey and continued playing with youth team respective. He made his senior debut as a centre-back in 3–1 victory over Napredak Kruševac on 16 September 2017. On 27 October 2017, Ranko signed his first professional contract, penning a deal that would keep him in Vojvodina until June 2021.

=== Vancouver Whitecaps ===
On 9 February 2020, it was announced that Vancouver Whitecaps of Major League Soccer had acquired Veselinović on a season-long loan, with an option to purchase, which they exercised on 18 October 2020.

== International career ==
Veselinović appeared as a member of Serbia national under-16 football team between 2014 and 2015, scoring a goal in 3–1 away victory over Russia on 23 August 2014. Later he also played for Serbian under-17 and under-18 selection until 2017. In August 2017, Veselinović was called into the Serbia U19 squad, when he made a debut at the memorial tournament "Stevan Vilotić - Ćele". In December 2017, Veselinović got his first call in Serbian under-21 team by coach Goran Đorović, instead of injured Srđan Babić. He made his debut for the team in away friendly against Qatar on 17 December 2017.

== Career statistics ==
=== Club ===
As of 31 December 2025

Appearances and goals by club, season and competition
Club	Season	League			Cup		Continental		Other		Total	
Club	Season	Division	Apps	Goals	Apps	Goals	Apps	Goals	Apps	Goals	Apps	Goals
Vojvodina	2016–17	Serbian SuperLiga	0	0	0	0	—		—		0	0
Vojvodina	2017–18	Serbian SuperLiga	21	0	2	0	0	0	—		23	0
Vojvodina	2018–19	Serbian SuperLiga	19	0	2	0	—		—		21	0
Vojvodina	2019–20	Serbian SuperLiga	19	1	1	0	—		—		20	1
Vojvodina	Total		59	1	5	0	0	0	—		64	1
Vancouver Whitecaps FC (loan)	2020	Major League Soccer	19	0	0	0	—		—		19	0
Vancouver Whitecaps FC	2021	Major League Soccer	27	1	1 (Note: Appearances in Canadian Championship)	0	—		—		28	1
Vancouver Whitecaps FC	2022	Major League Soccer	31	1	3	0	—		—		34	1
Vancouver Whitecaps FC	2023	Major League Soccer	32	2	2	0	3 (Note: Appearances in CONCACAF Champions League)	0	5 (Note: Three appearances in Leagues Cup, two appearances in MLS Cup playoffs)	0	42	2
Vancouver Whitecaps FC	2024	Major League Soccer	32	2	5	0	2	0	6 (Note: Two appearances and one goal in Leagues Cup, four appearances in MLS Cup playoffs)	1	45	3
Vancouver Whitecaps FC	2025	Major League Soccer	21	0	2	0	9	0	—		32	0
Total		Major League Soccer	162	6	13	0	14	0	11	1	200	7
Total			221	7	18	0	14	0	11	1	264	8

=== International ===
As of 25 January 2023

Serbia
Year	Apps	Goals
2021	1	0
2022	0	0
2023	1	0
Total	2	0

== Honours ==
Vancouver Whitecaps

- Canadian Championship: 2022, 2023, 2024, 2025
