= Luís Martins (footballer, born June 1992) =

Portuguese footballer

Personal information
- Full name: Luís Carlos Ramos Martins
- Date of birth: 10 June 1992 (age 34)
- Place of birth: Lamego, Portugal
- Height: 1.75 m (5 ft 9 in)
- Position: Left-back

Youth career
- 2003–2004: Cracks Lamego
- 2004–2005: Boavista
- 2005–2006: Cracks Lamego
- 2007: Diogo Cão
- 2007–2011: Benfica

Senior career*
Years	Team	Apps	(Gls)
2011–2012	Benfica	4	(0)
2012	Benfica B	15	(2)
2013–2014	Gil Vicente	40	(2)
2014–2018	Granada	5	(0)
2015–2016	→ Osasuna (loan)	9	(0)
2017–2018	→ Marítimo (loan)	22	(0)
2018–2019	Chaves	15	(1)
2019–2021	Sporting Kansas City	55	(1)
2022–2024	Vancouver Whitecaps FC	48	(0)
2022	Whitecaps FC 2	1	(0)

International career
2008	Portugal U16	2	(0)
2009	Portugal U17	1	(0)
2009	Portugal U18	2	(0)
2010–2011	Portugal U19	11	(1)
2011–2012	Portugal U20	13	(1)
2012–2014	Portugal U21	13	(0)
Medal record
Men's football
Representing Portugal
FIFA U-20 World Cup
Runner-up	2011 Colombia
- * Club domestic league appearances and goals as of 17:04, 2 September 2024 (UTC)

Luís Carlos Ramos Martins CvIH (Portuguese: [luˈiʒ mɐɾˈtĩʃ]; born 10 June 1992) is a Portuguese professional footballer who plays as a left-back.

== Club career ==
=== Benfica and Gil Vicente ===
Born in Lamego, Viseu District, Martins was promoted to S.L. Benfica's first team for the 2011–12 season. He made his official debut for the club on 2 November 2011, starting in a UEFA Champions League group stage game against FC Basel and being replaced at the hour-mark of the 1–1 home draw by Miguel Vítor.

Martins started the 2012–13 campaign with Benfica's reserves, in the Segunda Liga. On 9 January 2013, however, he signed a three-and-a-half-year contract with Gil Vicente F.C. of the Primeira Liga. He scored his first goal for the latter on 18 August of that year, closing a 2–0 home win over Académica de Coimbra.

=== Spain ===
On 1 September 2014, Martins agreed to a four-year deal with Granada CF from Spain, for an undisclosed fee. He played his first match in La Liga on the 27th, coming on as a second-half substitute in a 6–0 away loss to FC Barcelona.

On 24 August 2015, Martins was loaned to Segunda División side CA Osasuna for one year. Late into the 2017 January transfer window, after only 73 minutes of action upon his return to the Estadio Nuevo Los Cármenes, he joined C.S. Marítimo on a two-year loan.

=== Chaves ===
Martins signed a two-year contract with G.D. Chaves in June 2018. He scored his only goal for them on 10 February 2019, in a 2–1 league defeat at S.C. Braga.

=== Sporting KC ===
On 1 August 2019, Martins joined Sporting Kansas City until the end of the 2021 season with an option through to 2022. He scored his only goal for the club on 4 August 2021, the second in the 4–1 away win over Los Angeles FC.

Martins was released in November 2021.

=== Vancouver Whitecaps ===
On 4 May 2022, Martins signed with Vancouver Whitecaps FC also of the Major League Soccer for the remainder of the campaign. After winning consecutive Canadian Championship finals in 2022 and 2023, his contract was bought out in September 2024.

== International career ==
Martins was picked by Portugal under-20 coach Ilídio Vale for the 2011 FIFA World Cup in Colombia, helping the national team finish second to Brazil.

== Honours ==
Vancouver Whitecaps FC

- Canadian Championship: 2022, 2023

Portugal U20

- FIFA U-20 World Cup runner-up: 2011

Orders

- Knight of the Order of Prince Henry
