= Pedro Vite =

Ecuadorian footballer (born 2002)

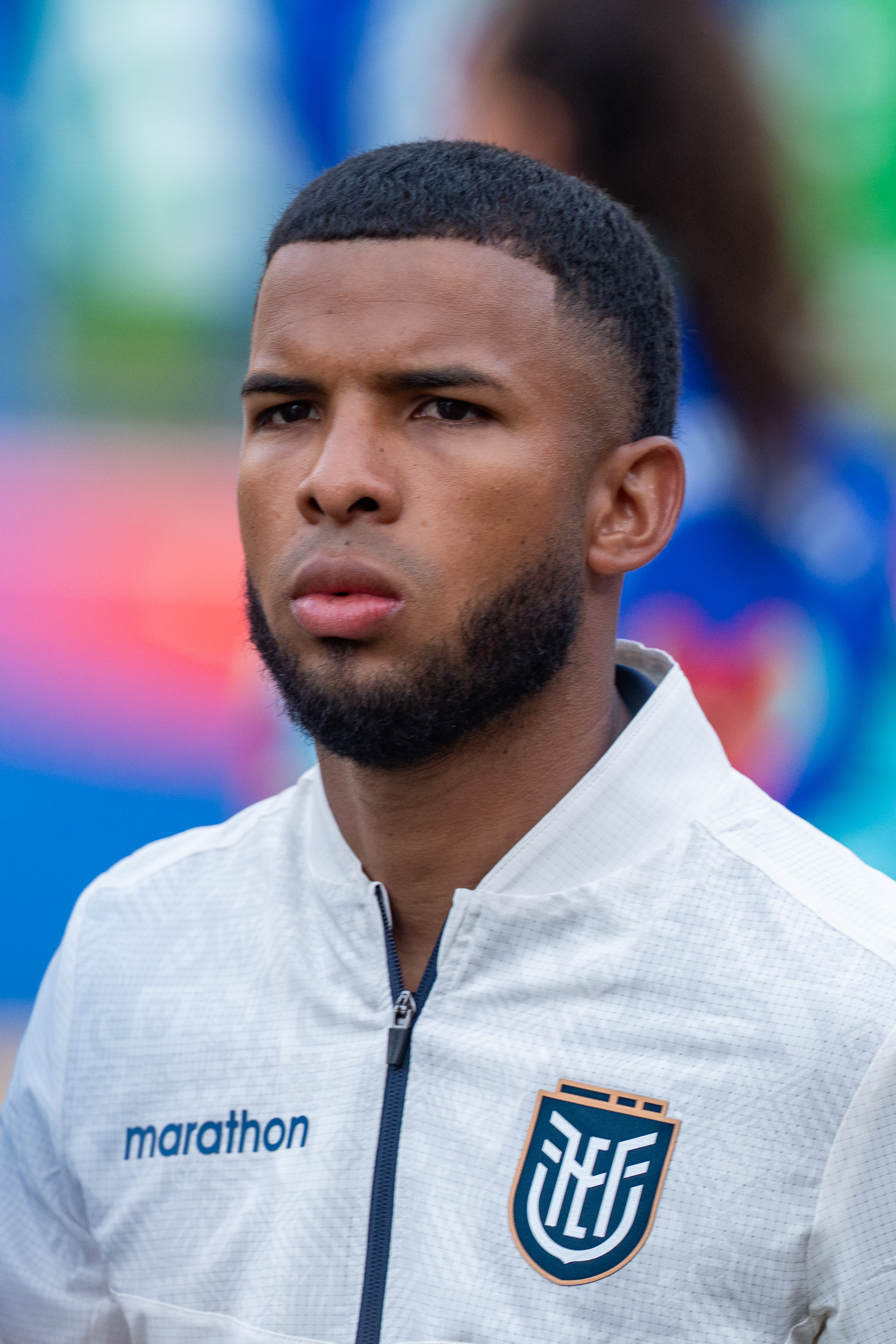
- Vite with Ecuador in 2026

Personal information
- Full name: Pedro Jeampierre Vite Uca
- Date of birth: 9 March 2002 (age 24)
- Place of birth: Babahoyo, Ecuador
- Height: 1.73 m (5 ft 8 in)
- Position: Attacking midfielder

Team information
- Current team: Pumas UNAM
- Number: 45

Youth career
- 2014–2019: Independiente del Valle

Senior career*
Years	Team	Apps	(Gls)
2019–2021	Independiente Juniors	14	(3)
2021	Independiente del Valle	14	(2)
2021–2025	Vancouver Whitecaps	105	(11)
2022	→ Whitecaps FC 2 (loan)	2	(1)
2025–	Pumas UNAM	52	(4)

International career^{‡}
2019	Ecuador U17	12	(3)
2024	Ecuador U23	5	(0)
2023–	Ecuador	24	(1)
- * Club domestic league appearances and goals as of 19 September 2026 ‡ National team caps and goals as of 5 October 2026

Pedro Jeampierre Vite Uca (born 9 March 2002) is an Ecuadorian professional footballer who plays as an attacking midfielder for Liga MX club Pumas UNAM and the Ecuador national team.

== Club career ==
Vite came up through the youth system at Independiente del Valle, going on to help the team win the U-20 Copa Libertadores in 2020. He made his professional debut for Independiente's reserve team, Independiente Juniors, in 2019 in the Ecuadorian Serie B. In 2021, Vite played his first season in the Ecuadorian Serie A, scoring two goals and tallying four assists in 14 appearances. He also played one match in the Supercopa Ecuador, and made ten appearances in the Copa Libertadores, scoring one goal and registering two assists across the tournament.

On 5 August 2021, Vite signed with Major League Soccer side Vancouver Whitecaps FC.

== International career ==
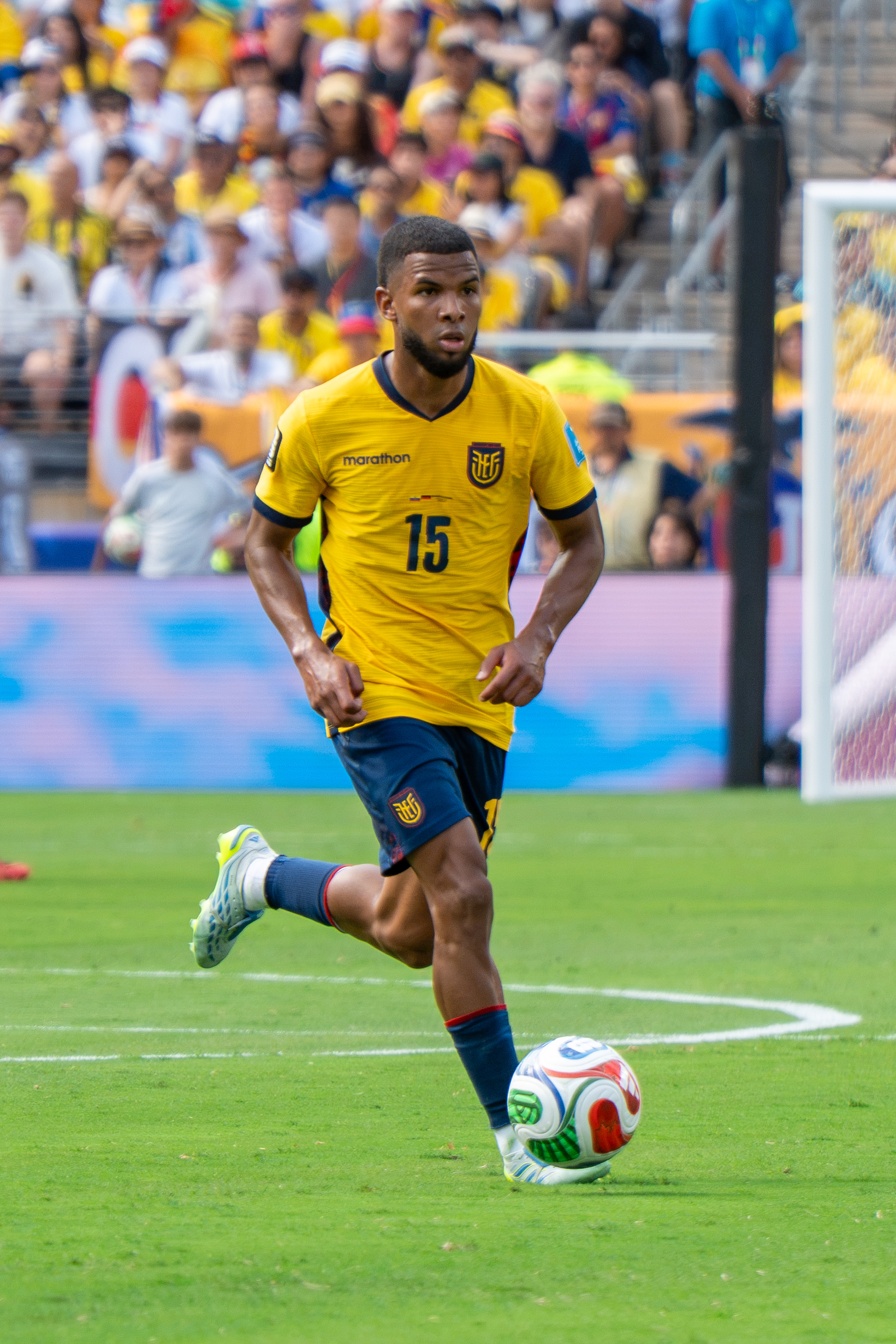
Vite during Ecuador v Germany at the 2026 FIFA World Cup

On 31 May 2026, Vite was selected in the 26-man squad for the 2026 FIFA World Cup.

== Style of play ==
Vite is a midfielder known for his composure in possession, passing ability, and work rate. He combines creativity with defensive intensity, contributing through chance creation, ball recoveries, and tackling.

== Career statistics ==
=== International ===
As of match played on 5 October 2026

Appearances and goals by national team and year
National team	Year	Apps	Goals
Ecuador	2023	1	1
Ecuador	2024	3	0
Ecuador	2025	9	0
Ecuador	2026	11	0
Total		24	1

Scores and results list Ecuador's goal tally first.

List of international goals scored by Pedro Vite
No.	Date	Venue	Opponent	Score	Result	Competition
1	20 June 2023	Subaru Park, Chester, United States	Costa Rica	3–1	3–1	Friendly

== Honours ==
Vancouver Whitecaps

- Canadian Championship: 2022, 2023, 2024
