= Javain Brown =

Jamaican footballer (born 1999)

Personal information
- Full name: Javain Okemio Brown
- Date of birth: 9 March 1999 (age 27)
- Place of birth: Kingston, Jamaica
- Height: 5 ft 11 in (1.80 m)
- Position: Right-back

Team information
- Current team: Lexington SC
- Number: 23

Youth career
- Kingston College

College career
Years	Team	Apps	(Gls)
2018–2020	South Florida Bulls	15	(3)

Senior career*
Years	Team	Apps	(Gls)
2016–2018	Harbour View	27	(1)
2017	→ Santos (loan)		
2019	Treasure Coast Tritons	5	(0)
2021–2024	Vancouver Whitecaps FC	95	(2)
2024–2025	Real Salt Lake	10	(0)
2026–	Lexington SC	28	(0)

International career^{‡}
2018–2019	Jamaica U20		
2017–	Jamaica	29	(0)
- * Club domestic league appearances and goals as of 11:28, 9 November 2026 (UTC) ‡ National team caps and goals as of 1 November 2026

Javain Okemio Brown (born 9 March 1999) is a Jamaican professional footballer who plays as a right-back for USL Championship side Lexington SC and the Jamaica national team.

== Club career ==
Brown captained his high school team, Kingston College. He played club football for the Jamaican clubs Harbour View and Santos. In May 2018 he signed for US college team USF Bulls, and will begin play with them from 2019.

On 22 March 2019, it was announced that Brown would play for the Treasure Coast Tritons of USL League Two during the 2019 season.

On 21 January 2021, Brown was selected 23rd overall in the 2021 MLS SuperDraft by Vancouver Whitecaps FC. Brown signed with Vancouver on 17 February 2021. He scored his first goal against Nashville SC on 30 July 2022.

He was waived by the Whitecaps on 29 July 2024, and was claimed by Real Salt Lake on 31 July 2024.

On 4 March 2026, Lexington SC announced they had signed Brown to a contract for the 2026 USL Championship season.

== International career ==
He made his senior international debut for Jamaica in 2017.

In October 2018 he was selected by the Jamaican under-20 team for the 2018 CONCACAF U-20 Championship.

== Honours ==
Vancouver Whitecaps

- Canadian Championship: 2022, 2023
