= Giovanni Aguilar =

American soccer player (born 1998)

Personal information
- Date of birth: March 8, 1998 (age 28)
- Place of birth: Yuba City, California, United States
- Height: 1.83 m (6 ft 0 in)
- Position: Midfielder

Team information
- Current team: Las Vegas Lights
- Number: 13

Youth career
- 2015–2017: Sacramento Republic

College career
| Years | Team | Apps | (Gls) |
| 2017–2021 | Cal State Northridge Matadors | 72 | (3) |

Senior career*
| Years | Team | Apps | (Gls) |
| 2019 | FC Golden State Force | 2 | (0) |
| 2022 | Sacramento Republic | 0 | (0) |
| 2022–2023 | Whitecaps FC 2 | 48 | (6) |
| 2023 | → Vancouver Whitecaps FC (loan) | 1 | (0) |
| 2024– | Las Vegas Lights | 1 | (0) |
- * Club domestic league appearances and goals as of October 31, 2024

Giovanni Aguilar (born March 8, 1998) is an American soccer player who plays as a midfielder for Las Vegas Lights.

== Career ==
=== Youth ===
Aguilar attended high school at Lindhurst High School in Olivehurst, California, where he was a three-time All-League selection, and was named high school MVP as a junior. In 2015, he joined the Sacramento Republic academy for their inaugural season, after previously playing with local side Davis Legacy. With Sacramento, Aguilar earned U.S. Development Academy Best XI honors in the Western Conference region in 2015.

=== College ===
In 2017, Aguilar attended California State University, Northridge to play college soccer. In four seasons with the Matadors, Aguilar made 72 appearances, scoring three goals and tallying eleven assists. In his freshman year he was named Big West Conference All-Freshman Team and in his senior year was Big West First Team All-Conference.

While at college, Aguilar spent time with USL League Two side FC Golden State Force, making two regular season appearances during their 2019 season.

=== Professional ===
On December 10, 2021, it was announced that Aguilar had signed with his former academy side Sacramento Republic ahead of their 2022 USL Championship season. On January 11, 2022, Aguilar was selected 49th overall in the 2022 MLS SuperDraft by Vancouver Whitecaps FC. A week later, Aguilar joined Vancouver for their preseason training camp. On March 18, 2022, it was announced that Aguilar had been transferred from Sacramento to Vancouver, where he'd opted to join the club's MLS Next Pro side Whitecaps FC 2. In his debut professional season, he made 22 appearances and scored four goals in the MLS Next Pro.

Aguilar moved to USL Championship side Las Vegas Lights ahead of their 2024 season. Aguilar played all 90 minutes in Las Vegas' season opener but was injured in training shortly after. He underwent successful right knee surgery on March 28, 2024.

== Personal life ==
Aguilar is the son of Juan and Lourdes Aguilar. He has two brothers, Jonathan and Joseph.
