= 2025 CONCACAF Champions Cup final =

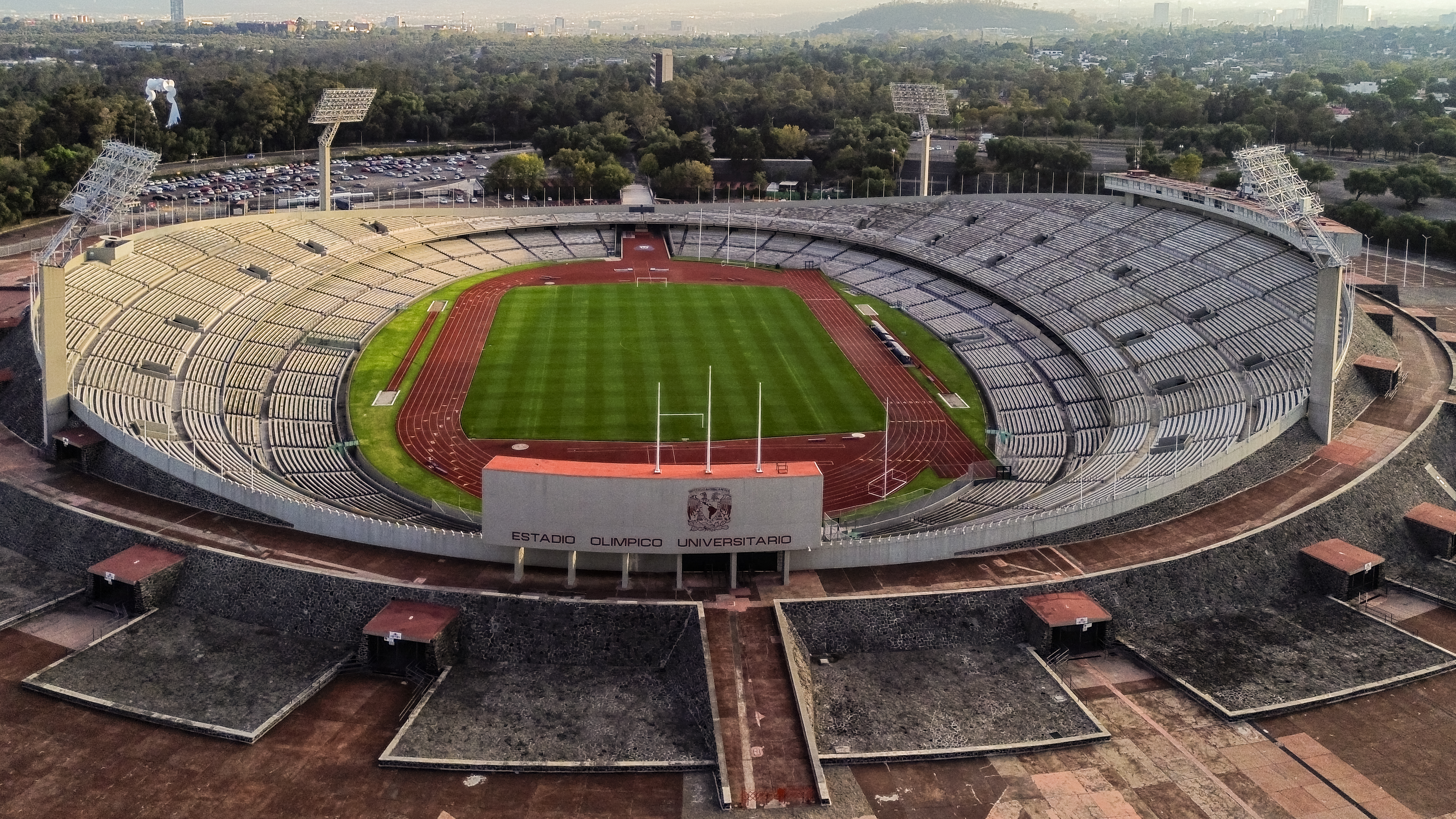
- The Estadio Olímpico Universitario in Mexico City hosted the final
- Event: 2025 CONCACAF Champions Cup
| Cruz Azul | Vancouver Whitecaps FC |
| (Mexico) | (Canada) |
| 5 | 0 |
- Date: 1 June 2025
- Venue: Estadio Olímpico Universitario, Mexico City
- Man of the Match: Ángel Sepúlveda (Cruz Azul)
- Referee: Walter López (Guatemala)
- Attendance: 33,046
- Weather: Cloudy; 16 °C (61 °F); 88% humidity

The 2025 CONCACAF Champions Cup final was the final match of the 2025 CONCACAF Champions Cup, the 60th season of North America, Central America, and the Caribbean's premier club association football tournament organized by CONCACAF. It was played on 1 June 2025.

The final was a single match contested by Vancouver Whitecaps FC of Major League Soccer and Cruz Azul of Liga MX. Cruz Azul hosted the match due to their better record during the competition's earlier stages.

Cruz Azul won the match 5–0, the largest margin of victory in a Champions Cup final match since América's 6–0 second leg win against Pinar del Río in 1990. As winners, they qualified for the 2025 FIFA Intercontinental Cup and the 2029 FIFA Club World Cup.

== Background ==
Vancouver Whitecaps FC made their first appearance in a CONCACAF Champions Cup final and were the third Canadian team to do so, following the Montreal Impact in 2015 and Toronto FC in 2018.

Cruz Azul made their seventh appearance in a Champions Cup final. Including editions won without a final match in 1970 and 1996, this marks their ninth title-deciding participation.

=== Previous finals ===
| Team | Previous final appearances (bold indicates winners) |
|---|---|
| (Mexico) Cruz Azul | 8 (**1969**, **1970**, **1971**, **1996**, **1997**, 2009, 2010, **2014**) |
| (Canada) Vancouver Whitecaps FC | 0 (debut) |

== Venue ==
=== Host selection ===
The finalist with the better record during the competition's earlier stages (excluding round one), Cruz Azul, hosted the match at Estadio Olímpico Universitario in Mexico City.

| Pos | Team | Pld | W | D | L | GF | GA | GD | Pts | Final |
|---|---|---|---|---|---|---|---|---|---|---|
| 1 | (Mexico) Cruz Azul (H) | 6 | 3 | 3 | 0 | 8 | 3 | +5 | **12** | Host |
| 2 | (Canada) Vancouver Whitecaps FC | 6 | 2 | 4 | 0 | 11 | 7 | +4 | **10** | |

Source: CONCACAF
Rules for classification: 1) Points; 2) Goal difference; 3) Goals scored; 4) Away goals scored; 5) Wins; 6) Away wins; 7) Disciplinary points; 8) Drawing of lots.
(H) Hosts

== Road to the final ==
=== Summary of results ===
Note: In all results below, the score of the finalist is given first (H: Home; A: Away).

| (Mexico) Cruz Azul | | | | Round | (Canada) Vancouver Whitecaps FC | | | |
|---|---|---|---|---|---|---|---|---|
| Opponent | Agg. | 1st leg | 2nd leg | Stages | Opponent | Agg. | 1st leg | 2nd leg |
| (Haiti) Real Hope | 7–0 | 2–0 (A) | 5–0 (H) | Round one | (Costa Rica) Saprissa | 3–2 | 1–2 (A) | 2–0 (H) |
| (United States) Seattle Sounders FC | 4–1 | 0–0 (A) | 4–1 (H) | Round of 16 | (Mexico) Monterrey | 3–3 (a) | 1–1 (H) | 2–2 (A) |
| (Mexico) América | 2–1 | 0–0 (A) | 2–1 (H) | Quarter-finals | (Mexico) Pumas UNAM | 3–3 (a) | 1–1 (H) | 2–2 (A) |
| (Mexico) Tigres UANL | 2–1 | 1–1 (A) | 1–0 (H) | Semi-finals | (United States) Inter Miami CF | 5–1 | 2–0 (H) | 3–1 (A) |

== Broadcasting ==
In Canada, the match was broadcast on OneSoccer, a subscription streaming service that also has a linear feed on Telus TV. Other broadcasters included Fox Sports and TUDN in the United States; Tubi in Mexico; Star+ in Central America, the Caribbean, and South America; and CONCACAF's YouTube channel in certain territories.

== Format ==
While the rest of the tournament was played as a home-and-away two-legged match pairing, the final was a single-leg match where the winners would be crowned the champions. The home team for the match would be the team with the better performance from the round of 16 to the semi-finals.

== Match ==
=== Details ===
1 June 2025
21:00 (19:00 UTC−6)

| Cruz Azul (Mexico) | 5–0 | (Canada) Vancouver Whitecaps FC |
|---|---|---|
| Rivero 8'; Faravelli 28'; Sepúlveda 37', 50'; Bogusz 45' | Report |

Estadio Olímpico Universitario, Mexico City
Attendance: 33,046
Referee: Walter López (Guatemala)

| **Cruz Azul** | **Vancouver Whitecaps FC** |

| GK | 23 | (Colombia) Kevin Mier |
| RB | 2 | (Mexico) Jorge Sánchez |
| CB | 4 | (Colombia) Willer Ditta |
| CB | 33 | (Argentina) Gonzalo Piovi |
| LB | 29 | (Argentina) Carlos Rotondi |
| CM | 19 | (Mexico) Carlos Rodríguez | (substituted off) 86' |
| CM | 6 | (Mexico) Érik Lira |
| CM | 8 | (Argentina) Lorenzo Faravelli | (substituted off) 77' |
| RF | 15 | (Uruguay) Ignacio Rivero (c) | (substituted off) 67' |
| CF | 9 | (Mexico) Ángel Sepúlveda | (substituted off) 77' |
| LF | 7 | (Poland) Mateusz Bogusz | (substituted off) 67' |
Substitutes:
| GK | 1 | (Mexico) Andrés Gudiño |
| GK | 30 | (Mexico) Emmanuel Ochoa |
| DF | 3 | (Mexico) Omar Campos |
| DF | 5 | (Mexico) Jesús Orozco | (substituted on) 67' |
| DF | 26 | (Mexico) Carlos Vargas |
| MF | 14 | (Mexico) Alexis Gutiérrez | (substituted on) 86' |
| MF | 17 | (Mexico) Amaury García |
| MF | 18 | (Argentina) Luka Romero | (substituted on) 77' |
| MF | 31 | (Mexico) Amaury Morales | (substituted on) 77' |
| MF | 32 | (Mexico) Cristian Jiménez |
| FW | 11 | (Greece) Giorgos Giakoumakis | (substituted on) 67' |
| FW | 21 | (Uruguay) Gabriel Fernández |
Manager:
(Uruguay) Vicente Sánchez

| GK | 1 | (Japan) Yohei Takaoka |
| RB | 18 | (Colombia) Édier Ocampo | | (substituted off) 46' |
| CB | 4 | (Serbia) Ranko Veselinović (c) | (yellow card) 65' | (substituted off) 86' |
| CB | 33 | (United States) Tristan Blackmon |
| LB | 3 | (Canada) Sam Adekugbe |
| CM | 45 | (Ecuador) Pedro Vite | | (substituted off) 63' |
| CM | 20 | (Paraguay) Andrés Cubas |
| CM | 26 | (Cameroon) J.C. Ngando | | (substituted off) 80' |
| RF | 22 | (Canada) Ali Ahmed |
| CF | 24 | (United States) Brian White |
| LF | 7 | (Canada) Jayden Nelson | | (substituted off) 46' |
Substitutes:
| GK | 30 | (United States) Adrian Zendejas |
| GK | 32 | (Canada) Isaac Boehmer |
| DF | 2 | (Uruguay) Mathías Laborda | | (substituted on) 46' |
| DF | 12 | (Syria) Belal Halbouni |
| DF | 15 | (Norway) Bjørn Inge Utvik | | (substituted on) 86' |
| DF | 27 | (Australia) Giuseppe Bovalina |
| DF | 28 | (United States) Tate Johnson |
| MF | 13 | (Canada) Ralph Priso | | (substituted on) 63' |
| MF | 59 | (Canada) Jeevan Badwal |
| FW | 11 | (United States) Emmanuel Sabbi | | (substituted on) 46' |
| FW | 14 | (Mexico) Daniel Ríos | | (substituted on) 80' |
| FW | 19 | (Croatia) Damir Kreilach |
Manager:
(Denmark) Jesper Sørensen

Man of the Match:
Ángel Sepúlveda (Cruz Azul)

Assistant referees:
Keytzel Corrales (Nicaragua)
Raymundo Feliz (Dominican Republic)
Fourth official:
Ismael Cornejo (El Salvador)
Video assistant referee:
Benjamín Pineda (Costa Rica)
Assistant video assistant referee:
Iván Barton (El Salvador)

**Match rules**

- 90 minutes
- 30 minutes of extra time if necessary
- Penalty shoot-out if scores still level
- Maximum of twelve named substitutes
- Maximum of five substitutions, with a sixth allowed in extra time
- Maximum of three substitution opportunities, with a fourth allowed in extra time
