= 2025 Vancouver Whitecaps FC season =

Vancouver Whitecaps FC 2025 soccer season

Vancouver Whitecaps FC
- Chairman: Jeff Mallett
- Head coach: Jesper Sørensen
- Stadium: BC Place (Vancouver, BC)
- Major League Soccer: Conference: 2nd; Overall: 5th
- MLS Cup playoffs: Runners-up
- Canadian Championship: Winners
- CONCACAF Champions Cup: Runners-up
- Top goalscorer: League: Brian White (16); All: Brian White (25)
- Highest home attendance: League/All: 26,741 (53,957)
- Lowest home attendance: League/All: 17,012 (9,613)
- Average home league attendance: 21,806
Home colours	Away colours

The 2025 Vancouver Whitecaps FC season was the club's fifteenth season in Major League Soccer, the top division of soccer in the United States and Canada. Including previous iterations of the franchise, this was the 48th season of professional soccer being played in Vancouver under a variation of the "Whitecaps" name.

Having won the 2024 Canadian Championship, the Whitecaps participated in the CONCACAF Champions Cup for a third consecutive season and fifth time overall. The club advanced to the final, where they were defeated by Liga MX side Cruz Azul, finishing as runner-up. The Whitecaps also participated in the 2025 Canadian Championship, winning their fourth domestic cup championship in a row. On January 28, MLS announced that all teams would participate in at least one but no more than two cup competitions. Due to their participation in the Canadian Championship and CONCACAF Champions Cup, the Whitecaps did not participate in the 2025 Leagues Cup.

On November 25, 2024, the Whitecaps parted ways with head coach Vanni Sartini. On January 14, 2025, the Whitecaps announced that they had hired Jesper Sørensen as their new head coach.

On August 6, 2025, the Whitecaps gained international attention due to the signing of German superstar and 2014 FIFA World Cup winner Thomas Müller in free agency after a storied 17-season club career at Bayern Munich, being a key centrepiece towards the team's multiple trophies. The signing helped boost morale for the team, as from Müller's debut with the Whitecaps on August 17, 2025, until the final regular season match of the season in a 1-2 loss to FC Dallas at home, the Whitecaps went on a ten game unbeaten streak in all competitions, including a MLS-era record of a postseason-clinching 7-0 win over the eventual Supporters' Shield winners Philadelphia Union on September 13, 2025, which is tied for the largest margin of victory in the 2025 Major League Soccer season. The Whitecaps finished the regular season with a MLS-era record 63 points; however, they did not win the Western Conference in the regular season due to losing a tiebreaker with San Diego FC, as the latter won one more game than the Whitecaps. However, the Whitecaps would eventually win their first Western Conference title against San Diego in the MLS Cup playoffs to advance to their first MLS Cup game in its MLS-era club history, where they would lose to Inter Miami 1-3.

== Roster ==
As of September 12, 2025

No.	Player	Nationality	Position	Date of birth (age)	Previous club
Goalkeepers
1	Yohei Takaoka	(Japan)	GK	March 16, 1996 (age 30)	(Japan) Yokohama F. Marinos
30	Adrian Zendejas	(United States)	GK	August 30, 1995 (age 31)	(Sweden) Skövde AIK
32	Isaac Boehmer	(Canada)	GK	November 20, 2001 (age 24)	(Canada) Vancouver Whitecaps Development Squad
50	Max Anchor	(Canada)	GK	July 21, 2004 (age 22)	(Canada) Whitecaps FC 2
Defenders
2	Mathías Laborda	(Uruguay)	DF	September 15, 1999 (age 27)	(Uruguay) Nacional
3	Sam Adekugbe	(Canada)	DF	January 16, 1995 (age 31)	(Turkey) Hatayspor
4	Ranko Veselinović	(Serbia)	DF	March 24, 1999 (age 27)	(Serbia) Vojvodina
12	Belal Halbouni	(Syria)	DF	December 29, 1999 (age 26)	(Germany) FC Magdeburg
15	Sebastian Schonlau	(Germany)	DF	August 5, 1994 (age 32)	(Germany) Hamburger SV
18	Édier Ocampo	(Colombia)	DF	October 3, 2003 (age 23)	(Colombia) Atlético Nacional
23	Joedrick Pupe	(Belgium)	DF	June 4, 1997 (age 29)	(Belgium) FCV Dender
27	Giuseppe Bovalina	(Australia)	DF	November 11, 2004 (age 22)	(Australia) Adelaide United
28	Tate Johnson	(United States)	DF	July 10, 2005 (age 21)	(United States) North Carolina Tar Heels
33	Tristan Blackmon	(United States)	DF	August 12, 1996 (age 30)	(United States) Charlotte FC
53	Mark O'Neill	(United States)	DF	March 8, 2002 (age 24)	(Canada) Whitecaps FC 2
Midfielders
6	Ralph Priso	(Canada)	MF	August 2, 2002 (age 24)	(United States) Colorado Rapids
13	Thomas Müller	(Germany)	MF	September 13, 1989 (age 37)	(Germany) Bayern Munich
16	Sebastian Berhalter	(United States)	MF	May 10, 2001 (age 25)	(United States) Columbus Crew
17	Kenji Cabrera	(Peru)	MF	January 23, 2003 (age 23)	(Peru) FBC Melgar
20	Andrés Cubas	(Paraguay)	MF	May 22, 1996 (age 30)	(France) Nîmes
22	Ali Ahmed	(Canada)	MF	October 10, 2000 (age 26)	(Canada) Whitecaps FC 2
25	Ryan Gauld	(Scotland)	MF	December 16, 1995 (age 30)	(Portugal) Farense
26	J.C. Ngando	(Cameroon)	MF	November 20, 1999 (age 26)	(United States) UNC Greensboro Spartans
59	Jeevan Badwal	(Canada)	MF	March 11, 2006 (age 20)	(Canada) Whitecaps FC 2
97	Liam Mackenzie	(Canada)	MF	March 15, 2007 (age 19)	(Canada) Whitecaps FC 2
Forwards
7	Jayden Nelson	(Canada)	FW	September 26, 2002 (age 24)	(Norway) Rosenborg
11	Emmanuel Sabbi	(United States)	FW	December 24, 1997 (age 28)	(France) Le Havre
14	Daniel Ríos	(Mexico)	FW	February 22, 1995 (age 31)	(Mexico) C.D. Guadalajara
24	Brian White	(United States)	FW	February 3, 1996 (age 30)	(United States) New York Red Bulls
42	Nelson Pierre	(Haiti)	FW	March 22, 2005 (age 21)	(United States) Philadelphia Union
75	Rayan Elloumi	(Canada)	FW	September 17, 2007 (age 19)	(Canada) Whitecaps FC 2
Out on Loan
52	Nicolas Fleuriau Chateau	(Canada)	FW	May 21, 2002 (age 24)	(Canada) Whitecaps FC 2

== Transfers ==
=== In ===
==== Transferred in ====
#	Position	Player	Transferred from	Fee/notes	Date	Source
28	DF	(United States) Tate Johnson	(United States) North Carolina Tar Heels	2025 MLS SuperDraft/Generation Adidas	December 20, 2024	
7	FW	(Canada) Jayden Nelson	(Norway) Rosenborg	Undisclosed	January 24, 2025	
11	FW	(United States) Emmanuel Sabbi	(France) Le Havre	Undisclosed	February 11, 2025	
30	GK	(United States) Adrian Zendejas	(Sweden) Skövde AIK	Free	February 14, 2025	
42	FW	(Haiti) Nelson Pierre	(Canada) Whitecaps FC 2/ (United States) Philadelphia Union	$50,000 fee to Philadelphia Union	June 28, 2025	
17	MF	(Peru) Kenji Cabrera	(Peru) FBC Melgar	Undisclosed/U22 Initiative	July 22, 2025	
13	MF	(Germany) Thomas Müller	(Germany) Bayern Munich	Free/Up to $400,000 GAM to FC Cincinnati for Discovery Rights	August 6, 2025	
97	MF	(Canada) Liam Mackenzie	(Canada) Whitecaps FC 2	Homegrown player	August 19, 2025	
15	DF	(Germany) Sebastian Schonlau	(Germany) Hamburger SV	Undisclosed	August 21, 2025	
23	DF	(Belgium) Joedrick Pupe	(Belgium) FCV Dender	Undisclosed	August 21, 2025	
53	DF	(United States) Mark O'Neill	(Canada) Whitecaps FC 2	Free	September 12, 2025	
75	FW	(Tunisia) Rayan Elloumi	(Canada) Whitecaps FC 2	Homegrown player	September 12, 2025	

==== Loans in ====
#	Position	Player	Loaned from	Date	Loan expires	Notes	Source
14	FW	(Mexico) Daniel Ríos	(Mexico) C.D. Guadalajara	February 17, 2025	December 31, 2025		

=== Out ===
==== Transferred out ====
#	Position	Player	Transferred to	Fee/notes	Date	Source
7	DF	(Canada) Ryan Raposo	(United States) Los Angeles FC	Out of contract	November 27, 2024	
8	MF	(Austria) Alessandro Schöpf	(Austria) Wolfsberger AC	Option declined	November 27, 2024	
11	FW	(Haiti) Fafà Picault	(United States) Inter Miami CF	Option declined	November 27, 2024	
17	GK	(United States) Joe Bendik	Retired	Option declined	November 27, 2024	
28	FW	(Canada) Levonte Johnson	(United States) Colorado Springs Switchbacks	Option declined	November 27, 2024	
23	FW	(Colombia) Déiber Caicedo	(Colombia) Atlético Junior	Undisclosed	January 12, 2025	
17	MF	(Scotland) Stuart Armstrong	(England) Sheffield Wednesday	Undisclosed	January 31, 2025	
19	FW	(Croatia) Damir Kreilach	(Croatia) HNK Rijeka	Contract buyout	July 5, 2025	
45	MF	(Ecuador) Pedro Vite	(Mexico) UNAM	$7,000,000	July 18, 2025	
15	DF	(Norway) Bjørn Inge Utvik	(Norway) Sarpsborg	Undisclosed	August 21, 2025	

==== Loans out ====
#	Position	Player	Loaned to	Date	Loan expires	Source
50	GK	(Canada) Max Anchor	(Canada) Pacific FC	March 14, 2025	September 12, 2025	
52	FW	(Canada) Nicolas Fleuriau Chateau	(Finland) Vaasan Palloseura	April 2, 2025	December 31, 2025	

=== MLS SuperDraft picks ===
Round	No.	Pos.	Player	College/Club team	Transaction	Source
1 (15)		DF	(United States) Tate Johnson	(United States) North Carolina	Signed to a Generation Adidas contract	
2 (45)		DF	(United States) Nikola Djordjevic	(United States) Southern Methodist	Signed with Whitecaps FC 2	

== Preseason and friendlies ==
Whitecaps FC confirmed their preseason schedule on January 15, 2025.

January 24	Whitecaps FC	2–3	Raków Częstochowa	Marbella, Spain
05:00 (PST)	Veselinović 12'; Blackmon 42'	Report	Amorim 30'; Ivi 54'; Brunes 75'	Stadium: Marbella Football Center

January 29	Whitecaps FC	1–1	St Patrick's Athletic	Marbella, Spain
05:00 (PST)	Johnson (yellow card) 45+1'; Kreilach 90+2' (pen.)		Keena 8'	Stadium: Marbella Football Center

February 2	Whitecaps FC	2–0	LNZ Cherkasy	Marbella, Spain
07:00 (PST)	Vite 3'; Gauld 10' (pen.)	Report		Stadium: Marbella Football Center

February 6	Whitecaps FC	2–0	Brommapojkarna	Marbella, Spain
06:00 (PST)	Nelson 45'; Ahmed 53'	Report		Stadium: Marbella Football Center

== Competition overview ==
Competition	First match	Last match	Starting round	Final position	Record							
Competition	First match	Last match	Starting round	Final position	Pld	W	D	L	GF	GA	GD	Win %
Major League Soccer	February 23	October 18	Matchday 1	2nd in West, 5th overall	34	18	9	7	66	38	+28	52.94
MLS Cup playoffs	October 26	December 6	Round one	Runners-up	5	2	2	1	10	7	+3	40.00
Canadian Championship	May 20	October 1	Quarter-finals	Winners	5	3	2	0	14	7	+7	60.00
CONCACAF Champions Cup	February 20	June 1	Round one	Runners-up	9	3	4	2	14	14	+0	33.33
Total					53	26	17	10	104	66	+38	49.06

Source: Competitions

== Major League Soccer ==
=== Regular season ===
==== League tables ====
Western Conference standings
Pos	Team	Pld	W	L	T	GF	GA	GD	Pts	Qualification
1	San Diego FC	34	19	9	6	64	41	+23	63	Qualification for round one and the CONCACAF Champions Cup round one
2	Vancouver Whitecaps FC	34	18	7	9	66	38	+28	63	Qualification for round one
3	Los Angeles FC	34	17	8	9	65	40	+25	60	Qualification for round one
4	Minnesota United FC	34	16	8	10	56	39	+17	58	Qualification for round one
5	Seattle Sounders FC	34	15	9	10	58	48	+10	55	Qualification for round one

Source: MLS
Rules for classification: 1) points; 2) total wins; 3) total goal differential; 4) total goals scored; 5) fewer disciplinary points; 6) away goal differential; 7) away goals scored; 8) home goals differential; 9) home goals scored; 10) coin toss (2 clubs tied) or drawing of lots (≥3 clubs tied)

Overall standings
Pos	Team	Pld	W	L	T	GF	GA	GD	Pts	Qualification
3	Inter Miami CF (C)	34	19	7	8	81	55	+26	65	Qualification for the CONCACAF Champions Cup round of 16 (Note: As 2025 MLS Cup champions)
4	San Diego FC	34	19	9	6	64	41	+23	63	Qualification for the CONCACAF Champions Cup round one (Note: As Western Conference regular season winners)
5	Vancouver Whitecaps FC (V)	34	18	7	9	66	38	+28	63	Qualification for the CONCACAF Champions Cup round one (Note: As second highest-ranked club in 2025 MLS Supporters' Shield not already qualified)
6	Los Angeles FC	34	17	8	9	65	40	+25	60	Qualification for the CONCACAF Champions Cup round one (Note: As third highest-ranked club in 2025 MLS Supporters' Shield not already qualified)
7	Charlotte FC	34	19	13	2	55	46	+9	59	

Source: MLS
Rules for classification: 1) points; 2) total wins; 3) total goal differential; 4) total goals scored; 5) fewer disciplinary points; 6) away goal differential; 7) away goals scored; 8) home goals differential; 9) home goals scored; 10) coin toss (2 clubs tied) or drawing of lots (≥3 clubs tied)
(C) MLS Cup champions; (V) Canadian Championship winners

==== Results ====
Overall								Home						Away					
Pld	Pts	W	L	T	GF	GA	GD	W	L	T	GF	GA	GD	W	L	T	GF	GA	GD
34	63	18	7	9	66	38	+28	10	3	4	42	20	+22	8	4	5	24	18	+6

Last updated: October 18, 2025
Pld = Matches played; Pts = Points; W = Matches won; T = Matches tied; L = Matches lost; GF = Goals for; GA = Goals against; GD = Goal difference

Round	1	2	3	4	5	6	7	8	9	10	11	12	13	14	15	16	17	18	19	20	21	22	23	24	25	26	27	28	29	30	31	32	33	34
Ground	A	H	H	A	H	A	H	H	A	A	H	H	A	A	H	H	A	H	A	A	A	A	A	H	A	H	H	H	A	H	A	A	H	H
Result	W	W	W	W	L	D	W	W	D	W	W	D	D	W	D	W	L	L	W	L	L	W	D	W	L	D	W	W	W	D	D	W	W	L
Position (West)	2	2	1	1	1	1	1	1	1	1	1	1	1	1	1	1	1	2	2	2	3	2	2	2	2	3	3	3	2	2	2	2	1	2

Updated to match(es) played on September 24, 2025. Source:
A = Away; H = Home; N = Neutral; W = Win; D = Draw; L = Loss; = Conference leader; = Playoffs berth; = Wild card berth

==== Matches ====
February 23 1 – Cascadia Cup	Portland Timbers	1–4	Whitecaps FC	Portland, Oregon
1:00 PM	K. Miller (red card) 11'; Fory (yellow card) 63'; Antony 73'	Report	Gauld 24', (yellow card) 89'; Vite 32'; Cubas (yellow card) 37'; Adekugbe 53'; Nelson 61'	Stadium: Providence Park; Attendance: 20,079; Referee: Victor Rivas

March 2 2	Whitecaps FC	2–1	LA Galaxy	Vancouver, British Columbia
2:00 PM	Adekugbe 3'; Berhalter (yellow card) 35'; Ocampo (yellow card) 78'; White 87', (yellow card) 88'	Report	Pec (yellow card) 18', (goal) 39'; Cerrillo (yellow card) 42'; Fagúndez (yellow card) 52'	Stadium: BC Place; Attendance: 21,124; Referee: Drew Fischer

March 8 3	Whitecaps FC	2–0	CF Montréal	Vancouver, British Columbia
6:30 PM	Laborda 32'; Johnson 49'; Ngando (yellow card) 90+4'	Report	Petrasso (yellow card) 39'; Craig (yellow card) 41'	Stadium: BC Place; Attendance: 19,531; Referee: Joe Dickerson

March 15 4	FC Dallas	0–1	Whitecaps FC	Frisco, Texas
5:30 PM	Acosta (yellow card) 42'; Lletget (yellow card) 53'	Report	Blackmon (yellow card) 52', (goal) 54'; Nelson (yellow card) 68'	Stadium: Toyota Stadium; Attendance: 11,004; Referee: Jair Marrufo

March 22 5	Whitecaps FC	1–3	Chicago Fire FC	Vancouver, British Columbia
7:30 PM	Ríos 14'; Badwal (yellow card) 71'	Report	Cuypers 1'; Gutman (yellow card) 43'; Zinckernagel 62'; Elliott (yellow card) 69'; Kouamé 90+4'	Stadium: BC Place; Attendance: 18,717; Referee: Malik Badaw

March 29 6	Toronto FC	0–0	Whitecaps FC	Toronto, Ontario
11:30 AM	Bernardeschi (yellow card) 65'	Report	Ocampo (yellow card) 81'	Stadium: BMO Field; Attendance: 22,301; Referee: Lukasz Szpala

April 5 7	Whitecaps FC	2–0	Colorado Rapids	Vancouver, British Columbia
6:30 PM	White 19'; Sabbi 38'; Cubas (yellow card) 45+1'; Priso (yellow card) 79'	Report	Cabral (yellow card) 53'; Larraz (yellow card) 57'; C. Bassett (yellow card) 85'; Awaziem (yellow card) 90'	Stadium: BC Place; Attendance: 17,993; Referee: Katja Koroleva

April 12 8	Whitecaps FC	5–1	Austin FC	Vancouver, British Columbia
4:30 PM	White 13', 38', 59', 82', (yellow card) 90'; Sabbi 47'; Priso (yellow card) 50'; Berhalter (yellow card) 86'; Blackmon (yellow card) 90+2'	Report	Wolff (yellow card) 20'; Pereira 90+1'	Stadium: BC Place; Attendance: 17,931; Referee: Victor Rivas

April 19 9	St. Louis City SC	0–0	Whitecaps FC	St. Louis, Missouri
5:30 PM	Klauss (yellow card) 36'; Wallem (yellow card) 62'	Report	Sabbi (yellow card) 42'; Cubas (yellow card) 56'; Vite (yellow card) 66'; Ahmed (yellow card) 90+2'	Stadium: Energizer Park; Attendance: 17,097; Referee: Pierre-Luc Lauziere

April 27 10	Minnesota United FC	1–3	Whitecaps FC	Saint Paul, Minnesota
12:00 PM	Trapp 80'	Report	Priso (yellow card) 9'; Berhalter 55', (yellow card) 76'; Vite 66', 70'	Stadium: Allianz Field; Attendance: 18,851; Referee: Drew Fischer
Note: Rescheduled from April 26 due to Vancouver Whitecaps FC making the 2025 CONCACAF Champions Cup semifinals.

May 3 11	Whitecaps FC	2–1	Real Salt Lake	Vancouver, British Columbia
6:30 PM	Nelson 20'; Ríos (yellow card) 64'; Blackmon 70'	Report	Ojeda (yellow card) 22'; Glad (yellow card) 51'; Luna (yellow card) 62', (goal) 90+6' (pen.)	Stadium: BC Place; Attendance: 19,762; Referee: Malik Badawi

May 11 12	Whitecaps FC	2–2	Los Angeles FC	Vancouver, British Columbia
4:00 PM	White 26', 70'; Nelson (yellow card) 57'; Cubas (yellow card) 66'	Report	Delgado 8'; Bouanga 19' (pen.); Palencia (yellow card) 28'; Martínez (yellow card) 45+1'; Hollingshead (yellow card) 61'	Stadium: BC Place; Attendance: 22,437; Referee: Joe Dickerson

May 17 13	Austin FC	0–0	Whitecaps FC	Austin, Texas
6:30 PM	Biro (yellow card) 39'; Sánchez (yellow card) 68'; Wolff (yellow card) 76'	Report	Ocampo (yellow card) 39'	Stadium: Q2 Stadium; Attendance: 20,738; Referee: Alexis Da Silva

May 24 14	Real Salt Lake	2–3	Whitecaps FC	Sandy, Utah
6:30 PM	Gozo 1'; Luna 4'; Agada (yellow card) 45+4'; Caliskan (yellow card) 59'; Marczuk (yellow card) 62'; Katranis (yellow card) 65'; Eneli (yellow card) 90+4'	Report	White 20', 25' (pen.); Ahmed (yellow card) 77'; Priso (yellow card) 83'; Vite 90'	Stadium: America First Field; Attendance: 20,034; Referee: Filip Dujic

May 28 15	Whitecaps FC	0–0	Minnesota United FC	Vancouver, British Columbia
7:30 PM	Berhalter (yellow card) 73'	Report	Romero (yellow card) 76'; Markanich (yellow card) 90+1'	Stadium: BC Place; Attendance: 17,012; Referee: Allen Chapman

June 8 17 – Cascadia Cup	Whitecaps FC	3–0	Seattle Sounders FC	Vancouver, British Columbia
6:00 PM	Badwal 40'; Rios 70'; Kreilach 88' (pen.)	Report	Nouhou (red card) 52'; Bell (red card) 55'	Stadium: BC Place; Attendance: 24,276; Referee: Ricardo Fierro

June 14 18	Columbus Crew	2–1	Whitecaps FC	Columbus, Ohio
4:30 PM	Aliyu 2'; Rossi 23'; Gazdag (yellow card) 85'	Report	Ngando 6'; Blackmon (yellow card) 32'	Stadium: Lower.com Field; Attendance: 20,721; Referee: Guido Gonzales Jr.

June 25 19	Whitecaps FC	3–5	San Diego FC	Vancouver, British Columbia
7:30 PM	Ocampo 43'; Laborda (yellow card) 52', (goal) 66'; Cubas (yellow card) 81'; Coupland 90+6'	Report	McVey (yellow card) 23'; Iloski 35', 37', 44', 47'; Alvarado Jr. (yellow card) 45+5'; Ángel 90'	Stadium: BC Place; Attendance: 20,867; Referee: Ramy Touchan

June 29 20	Los Angeles FC	0–1	Whitecaps FC	Los Angeles, California
6:30 PM	Giroud (yellow card) 57'	Report	Sabbi 20'; Johnson (yellow card) 25'; Priso (yellow card) 57'	Stadium: BMO Stadium; Attendance: 22,116; Referee: Jon Freeman
Note: Rescheduled from June 28, due to Los Angeles FC's participation in the 2025 FIFA Club World Cup

July 4 21	LA Galaxy	3−0	Whitecaps FC	Carson, California
7:30 PM	Nascimento 2', (yellow card) 18'; Paintsil 60', 77' (pen.)	Report	Laborda (yellow card) 35'; Nelson (yellow card) 55' (yellow-red card) 90+2'; Ocampo (yellow card) 72'; Veselinovic (yellow card) 74'; Utvik (yellow card) 86'	Stadium: Dignity Health Sports Park; Attendance: 19,557; Referee: Victor Rivas

July 12 22	Colorado Rapids	3–0	Whitecaps FC	Commerce City, Colorado
6:30 PM	Harris 12', (yellow card) 41'; Navarro 30'; Maxsø (yellow card) 51', (goal) 59'	Report	Sabbi (yellow card) 27'	Stadium: Dick's Sporting Goods Park; Attendance: 16,110; Referee: Ricardo Fierro

July 16 23	Houston Dynamo FC	0–3	Whitecaps FC	Houston, Texas
5:30 PM	Bassi (yellow card) 34'; Raines (yellow card) 49'; Kowalczyk (yellow card) 76'; Awodesu (yellow card) 89'; Escobar (yellow card) 90+7'	Report	Sabbi 4', (yellow card) 38'; Berhalter (yellow card) 15', (goal) 42'; White (yellow card) 50', (goal) 56'; Johnson (yellow card) 70'	Stadium: Shell Energy Stadium; Attendance: 15,266; Referee: Rubiel Vazquez

July 19 24	San Diego FC	1–1	Whitecaps FC	San Diego, California
7:30 PM	Bombino (yellow card) 12'; Pilcher 79'	Report	Duah 40' (o.g.); Ocampo (yellow card) 44'; Laborda (yellow card) 51'; Halbouni (yellow card) 90+6'; Johnson (yellow card) 90+8'	Stadium: Snapdragon Stadium; Attendance: 27,418; Referee: Alexis Da Silva

July 26 25	Whitecaps FC	3–0	Sporting Kansas City	Vancouver, British Columbia
7:30 PM	Sabbi (yellow card) 3', (goal) 35'; Ngando 43'; Laborda 87'	Report	Joveljić (yellow card) 27'; Leibold (yellow card) 52'	Stadium: BC Place; Attendance: 20,719; Referee: Lukasz Szpala

August 9 26	San Jose Earthquakes	2–1	Whitecaps FC	San Jose, California
7:30 PM	Munie (yellow card) 32'; Martínez 54' (pen.); Romney (yellow card) 61'; Kaye (yellow card) 77'; Wilson (yellow card) 81'; Judd 90+4'; Espinoza (yellow card) 90+10'	Report	Ocampo (yellow card) 20' (yellow-red card) 27'; Laborda (yellow card) 73'; White 88'	Stadium: PayPal Park; Attendance: 16,356; Referee: Tim Ford

August 17 27	Whitecaps FC	1–1	Houston Dynamo FC	Vancouver, British Columbia
6:00 PM	White 6' (pen.); Cubas (yellow card) 26'; Halbouni (yellow card) 36'	Report	Kowalczyk (yellow card) 39'; Ortiz (yellow card) 42'; Raines (yellow card) 45+1' (yellow-red card) 90+7'; Artur 90+1'	Stadium: BC Place; Attendance: 26,031; Referee: Jon Freeman

August 23 28	Whitecaps FC	3–2	St. Louis City SC	Vancouver, British Columbia
6:30 PM	White 45+4' (pen.); Cubas (yellow card) 69'; Rios 79'; Müller 90+14' (pen.)	Report	Löwen 14'; Klauss 73'	Stadium: BC Place; Attendance: 26,031; Referee: Fotis Bazakos

September 13 30	Whitecaps FC	7–0	Philadelphia Union	Vancouver, British Columbia
6:30 PM	Müller (yellow card) 8', (goal) 29' (pen.), 45+1' (pen.), 88'; Blackmon (yellow card) 16'; Laborda 18'; Sabbi 24', 61'; Johnson (yellow card) 74'; Elloumi 80'	Report	Iloski (yellow card) 68'; Baribo (yellow card) 75'; Lukić (yellow card) 87'	Stadium: BC Place; Attendance: 26,031; Referee: Allen Chapman

September 20 31	Sporting Kansas City	0–2	Whitecaps FC	Kansas City, Kansas
5:30 PM	Bassong (yellow card) 44'; Montes (yellow card) 82'	Report	Ocampo 2', (yellow card) 53'; Cubas (yellow card) 10'; Cabrera 43'; Halbouni (yellow card) 57'; Rios (yellow card) 66'; Berhalter (yellow card) 90+6'	Stadium: Children's Mercy Park; Attendance: 15,026; Referee: Tori Penso

September 24 16 – Cascadia Cup	Whitecaps FC	1–1	Portland Timbers	Vancouver, British Columbia
7:30 PM	Halbouni (yellow card) 57'; White 88'	Report	K. Miller 39'; Župarić (yellow card) 47'; Paredes (yellow card) 67'; Smith (yellow card) 71'; Chará (yellow card) 74'	Stadium: BC Place; Attendance: 20,212; Referee: Jon Freemon
Note: This match was originally scheduled for May 31 at 6:30 pm, but was rescheduled due to Vancouver's participation in the 2025 CONCACAF Champions Cup final.

September 27 32 – Cascadia Cup	Seattle Sounders FC	2–2	Whitecaps FC	Seattle, Washington
7:30 PM	Rothrock (yellow card) 40'; Nouhou (yellow card) 45+2'; Ragen 54'; Rusnák 55'	Report	Laborda (yellow card) 4', (goal) 69'; White 52'	Stadium: Lumen Field; Attendance: 32,750; Referee: Malik Badawi

October 5 33	Whitecaps FC	4–1	San Jose Earthquakes	Vancouver, British Columbia
3:00 PM	Elloumi 39'; Cubas (yellow card) 45+1'; Ocampo (yellow card) 47'; Müller 57'; Berhalter 74', 90+2'	Report	Espinoza (yellow card) 12'; Kikanović (yellow card) 38'; Arango (yellow card) 42'; Judd (yellow card) 67'; Leroux 89'	Stadium: BC Place; Attendance: 25,292; Referee: Rosendo Mendoza

October 11 29	Orlando City SC	1–2	Whitecaps FC	Orlando, Florida
4:30 PM	Þórhallsson 24'; Schlegel (yellow card) 48'; Angulo (yellow card) 77'; Smith (yellow card) 90+9'	Report	Pierre 81'; Müller 90+7'	Stadium: Inter&Co Stadium; Attendance: 23,465; Referee: Serhiy Boyko
Note: This match was originally scheduled for August 30 at 4:30 pm, but was rescheduled due to Orlando's participation in the 2025 Leagues Cup.

October 18 34	Whitecaps FC	1–2	FC Dallas	Vancouver, British Columbia
6:00 PM	Ocampo (yellow card) 2'; Laborda (red card) 11'; Müller 28' (pen.)	Report	Urhoghide 18' (yellow card) 89'; Abubakar (yellow card) 27'; Julio (yellow card) 45+1'; Kaick 47'; Kamungo (yellow card) 71'	Stadium: BC Place; Attendance: 26,741; Referee: Allen Chapman

=== MLS Cup playoffs ===
==== Round One ====
October 26 Game 1	Whitecaps FC	3–0	FC Dallas	Vancouver, British Columbia
4:30 PM	Ríos 43'; Müller 60' (pen.); Cabrera 83'; Johnson (yellow card) 90+4'	Report	Ramiro (yellow card) 73'; Sali (yellow card) 89'; Urhoghide (yellow card) 90+6'	Stadium: BC Place; Attendance: 32,066; Referee: Victor Rivas

November 1 Game 2	FC Dallas	1–1 (2–4 p)	Whitecaps FC	Frisco, Texas
6:30 PM	Urhoghide (yellow card) 11'; Musa 25'; Cappis (yellow card) 32'; Ibeagha (yellow card) 36'; Kaick (yellow card) 90+2'	Report	Cubas (yellow card) 71'; Priso 90+3'	Stadium: Toyota Stadium; Attendance: 11,004; Referee: Tori Penso
	Penalties
	Musa (penalty scored); Delgado (penalty missed); Moore (penalty scored); Norris (penalty missed)		Müller (penalty scored); Berhalter (penalty scored); Cabrera (penalty scored); Halbouni (penalty scored)
Note: Whitecaps FC won the series 2–0.

==== Conference semifinals ====
November 22 Conference semifinal	Whitecaps FC	2–2 (4–3 p)	Los Angeles FC	Vancouver, British Columbia
6:30 PM	Sabbi 39'; Müller (yellow card) 44'; Laborda 45+1'; Blackmon (yellow card) 64' (yellow-red card) 90+2'; Berhalter (yellow card) 87'; Priso (yellow card) 97'; Takaoka (yellow card) 102'	Report	Delgado (yellow card) 52'; Son 60', 90+5'; Porteous (yellow card) 77'; Raposo (yellow card) 81'; Amaya (yellow card) 95'	Stadium: BC Place; Attendance: 53,957; Referee: Rubiel Vazquez
	Penalties
	Berhalter (penalty scored); Nelson (penalty scored); Gauld (penalty scored); Ocampo (penalty missed); Laborda (penalty scored)		(penalty missed) Son; (penalty scored) Bouanga; (penalty missed) Delgado; (penalty scored) Moran; (penalty scored) Amaya

==== Conference finals ====
November 29 Conference final	San Diego FC	1–3	Whitecaps FC	San Diego, California
6:00 PM	Valakari (yellow card) 27'; Lozano 60' (yellow card) 75'; Duah (yellow card) 66'; Sisniega (red card) 79'	Report	Ocampo (yellow card) 5'; White 8', 45+2'; Sisniega 11' (o.g.); Cubas (yellow card) 60'	Stadium: Snapdragon Stadium; Attendance: 32,502; Referee: Joe Dickerson

==== MLS Cup ====
December 6 MLS Cup	Inter Miami CF	3–1	Whitecaps FC	Fort Lauderdale, Florida
11:30 AM	Ocampo 8' (o.g.); Rodríguez (yellow card) 13'; Falcón (yellow card) 48'; De Paul 71', (yellow card) 86'; Allende 90+6'; Ríos Novo (yellow card) 90+8'	Report	White (yellow card) 17'; Ocampo (yellow card) 45'; Ahmed 60'; Blackmon (yellow card) 66'; Cubas (yellow card) 74'; Laborda (yellow card) 86'; Berhalter (yellow card) 90+4'	Stadium: Chase Stadium; Attendance: 21,556; Referee: Drew Fischer

== Canadian Championship ==
As champions of the 2024 tournament, the Whitecaps received a bye into the quarter-finals.

=== Quarterfinals ===
May 20 First leg	Valour FC	2–2	Whitecaps FC	Winnipeg, Manitoba
5:30 PM	Figueiredo (yellow card) 7', (goal) 51'; Romeo 38', (yellow card) 56'; Pierazzi (red card) 67'; Twardek (yellow card) 67'; Facchineri (yellow card) 73'; Williams (yellow card) 89'		Adekugbe 6'; Badwal (yellow card) 26'; Boehmer (yellow card) 38'; Ahmed 80'	Stadium: Princess Auto Stadium; Attendance: 3,500; Referee: Yusri Rudolf

July 9 Second leg	Whitecaps FC	2–1	Valour FC	Vancouver, British Columbia
7:00 PM	Sabbi 79'; Utvik 90+2'	Report	Figueiredo (yellow card) 53'; Fernandez (yellow card) 59'; Layne 86'	Stadium: BC Place; Attendance: 14,536; Referee: Alain Ruch
Note: Whitecaps FC won 4–3 on aggregate.

=== Semifinals ===
August 13 First leg	Forge FC	2–2	Whitecaps FC	Hamilton, Ontario
4:00 PM	Ampomah 10'; Choinière (yellow card) 31'; Wright 34'; Jensen (yellow card) 83'	Report	Blackmon 18', (yellow card) 75'; White 29'	Stadium: Hamilton Stadium; Attendance: 8,324; Referee: Yusri Rudolf

September 16 Second leg	Whitecaps FC	4–0	Forge FC	Vancouver, British Columbia
7:00 PM	Blackmon 7'; Badwal (yellow card) 18'; Ngando 28'; Berhalter 49' (pen.); Cabrera (yellow card) 80'; Nelson 85'	Report	Rama (yellow card) 26'; Hojabrpour (yellow card) 34'; Jevremović (yellow card) 48'	Stadium: BC Place; Attendance: 10,752; Referee: Michael Venne

=== Final ===
October 1 Final	Whitecaps FC	4–2	Vancouver FC	Vancouver, British Columbia
5:00 PM	Ahmed 5', 36'; Müller 10' (pen.); Gauld 83'	Report	Dada-Luke (yellow card) 18'; Bah 35', (yellow card) 49'; Cavalcante (yellow card) 39'; Pathé (yellow card) 72'; Mezquida 85'	Stadium: BC Place; Attendance: 18,372; Referee: Drew Fischer

== CONCACAF Champions Cup ==
=== Round one ===
February 20 First leg	Saprissa (Costa Rica)	2–1	Whitecaps FC	San Juan de Tibás, Costa Rica
5:00 PM	Waston (yellow card) 4'; Bolaños (yellow card) 34'; M. Torres 51', (yellow card) 65'; Sequeria (yellow card) 82'; Rodríguez 90+5'	Report	Gauld 21'; Cubas (yellow card) 42'; Laborda (yellow card) 80'; Ahmed (yellow card) 82'	Stadium: Estadio Ricardo Saprissa Aymá; Attendance: 10,947; Referee: Iván Bárton (El Salvador)

February 27 Second leg	Whitecaps FC	2–0 (3–2 agg.)	(Costa Rica) Saprissa	Vancouver, British Columbia
7:00 PM	White 47', 90+1'	Report	Guzmán (yellow card) 26'	Stadium: BC Place; Attendance: 14,059; Referee: Adonai Escobedo (Mexico)
Note: Whitecaps FC won 3–2 on aggregate.

=== Round of 16 ===
March 5 First leg	Whitecaps FC	1–1	(Mexico) Monterrey	Vancouver, British Columbia
7:30 PM PST	Laborda (yellow card) 13'; Berhalter (yellow card) 77'; White (yellow card) 84'; Halbouni 86'	Report	Ambríz (yellow card) 8'; de la Rosa 25'; Cortizo (yellow card) 37'; Moreno (yellow card) 54'; Reyes (yellow card) 55'	Stadium: BC Place; Attendance: 9,613; Referee: Kwinsi Williams (Trinidad and Tobago)

March 12 Second leg	Monterrey (Mexico)	2–2 (3–3 (a) agg.)	Whitecaps FC	Torreón, Mexico (Note: Due to a Shakira concert at Estadio BBVA, Monterrey played their second Round of 16 round match in Torreón.)
5:30 PM PDT	Canales 4'; Chávez (yellow card) 45+2'; Ramos 90+7' (pen.)	Report	Ocampo 57'; White 78'	Stadium: Estadio Corona; Attendance: 10,420; Referee: Selvin Brown (Honduras)
Note: Tied 3–3 on aggregate. Vancouver Whitecaps FC won on away goals.

=== Quarterfinals ===
April 2 First leg	Whitecaps FC	1–1	(Mexico) UNAM	Vancouver, British Columbia
6:30 PM PDT	Nelson (yellow card) 69'; White 71'; Blackmon (yellow card) 90+7'	Report	Suárez (yellow card) 81'; Carrasquilla 87'; Ruvalcaba (yellow card) 90+7'	Stadium: BC Place; Attendance: 12,356; Referee: Keylor Herrera (Costa Rica)

April 9 Second leg	UNAM (Mexico)	2–2 (3–3 (a) agg.)	Whitecaps FC	Mexico City, Mexico
7:30 PM PDT	Martínez 37', (yellow card) 57'; Duarte (yellow card) 62'; Ruvalcaba (yellow card) 71'; Pussetto 88'		Berhalter 33'; Ríos (yellow card) 45'; Ocampo (yellow card) 62'; Vite (yellow card) 70'; Blackmon 90+3'	Stadium: Estadio Olímpico Universitario; Attendance: 19,397; Referee: Walter López (Guatemala)
Note: 3–3 on aggregate. Vancouver Whitecaps FC won on away goals.

=== Semifinals ===
April 24 First leg	Whitecaps FC	2–0	(United States) Inter Miami CF	Vancouver, British Columbia
7:30 PM PDT	White 24', (yellow card) 45+2'; Blackmon (yellow card) 48'; Berhalter 85', (yellow card) 90+4'	Report	Redondo (yellow card) 48'; Bright (yellow card) 73'; Mascherano (yellow card) 90+2'	Stadium: BC Place; Attendance: 53,937; Referee: Mario Escobar (Guatemala)

April 30 Second leg	Inter Miami CF (United States)	1–3 (1–5 agg.)	Whitecaps FC	Fort Lauderdale, Florida
5:00 PM PDT	Alba 9'; Falcón (yellow card) 24'; Redondo (yellow card) 45+1'; Segovia (yellow card) 62'	Report	Johnson (yellow card) 33'; Berhalter (yellow card) 45+1', (goal) 71'; White 51'; Vite 53'; Cubas (yellow card) 65'	Stadium: Chase Stadium; Attendance: 21,225; Referee: Saíd Martínez (Honduras)

=== Final ===
June 1 Final	Cruz Azul	5–0	(Canada) Whitecaps FC	Mexico City, Mexico
6:00 PM PDT	Rivero 8'; Faravelli 28'; Sepúlveda 37', 50'; Bogusz 45'	Report	Veselinović (yellow card) 65'	Stadium: Estadio Olímpico Universitario; Attendance: 33,046; Referee: Walter López (Guatemala)

== Leagues Cup ==
While Vancouver Whitecaps FC qualified for the 2025 Leagues Cup as one of the top 9 teams in the Western Conference for the 2024 season, they were already capped on their two continental competitions they could participate in (2025 Canadian Championship and 2025 CONCACAF Champions Cup) and instead gave their spot to expansion team San Diego FC.

== Cascadia Cup ==
2025 Cascadia Cup standings
Pos	Team	Pld	W	D	L	GF	GA	GD	Pts
1	Vancouver Whitecaps FC	4	2	2	0	10	4	+6	8
2	Seattle Sounders FC	4	1	2	1	4	6	−2	5
3	Portland Timbers	4	0	2	2	3	7	−4	2

Source: "Schedule". MLSsoccer.com.
Rules for classification: Scoring

Overall								Home						Away					
Pld	Pts	W	L	T	GF	GA	GD	W	L	T	GF	GA	GD	W	L	T	GF	GA	GD
4	8	2	0	2	10	4	+6	1	0	1	4	1	+3	1	0	1	6	3	+3

Last updated: September 27, 2025
Source: Standings
Pld = Matches played; Pts = Points; W = Matches won; T = Matches tied; L = Matches lost; GF = Goals for; GA = Goals against; GD = Goal difference

== Statistics ==
=== Appearances and goals ===
As of December 1, 2025

No.	Pos	Nat	Player	Total		MLS		MLS Playoffs		Canadian Championship		Champions Cup	
No.	Pos	Nat	Player	Apps	Goals	Apps	Goals	Apps	Goals	Apps	Goals	Apps	Goals
Goalkeepers
1	GK	(Japan) JPN	Yohei Takaoka	46	0	34	0	5	0	0	0	7	0
30	GK	(United States) USA	Adrian Zendejas	0	0	0	0	0	0	0	0	0	0
32	GK	(Canada) CAN	Isaac Boehmer	7	0	0	0	0	0	5	0	2	0
50	GK	(Canada) CAN	Max Anchor	0	0	0	0	0	0	0	0	0	0
Defenders
2	DF	(Uruguay) URU	Mathías Laborda	42	6	25+3	5	3+1	1	2+3	0	3+2	0
3	DF	(Canada) CAN	Sam Adekugbe	12	3	4+3	2	0	0	1	1	3+1	0
4	DF	(Serbia) SRB	Ranko Veselinović	32	0	20+1	0	0	0	1+1	0	8+1	0
12	DF	(Syria) SYR	Belal Halbouni	22	1	7+6	0	2+1	0	3	0	2+1	1
15	DF	(Germany) GER	Sebastian Schonlau	0	0	0	0	0	0	0	0	0	0
18	DF	(Colombia) COL	Édier Ocampo	47	3	26+4	2	5	0	4	0	7+1	1
23	DF	(Belgium) BEL	Joedrick Pupe	2	0	0	0	0+2	0	0	0	0	0
27	DF	(Australia) AUS	Giuseppe Bovalina	10	0	2+5	0	0+1	0	0+2	0	0	0
28	DF	(United States) USA	Tate Johnson	42	1	20+9	1	3	0	4	0	5+1	0
33	DF	(United States) USA	Tristan Blackmon	37	6	23+2	3	1	0	2+1	2	8	1
53	DF	(United States) USA	Mark O'Neill	0	0	0	0	0	0	0	0	0	0
Midfielders
6	MF	(Canada) CAN	Ralph Priso	46	1	14+14	0	5	1	3+2	0	3+5	0
13	MF	(Germany) GER	Thomas Müller	13	9	6+1	7	5	1	1	1	0	0
16	MF	(United States) USA	Sebastian Berhalter	47	8	25+4	4	5	0	3+2	1	8	3
17	MF	(Peru) PER	Kenji Cabrera	13	2	2+4	1	0+4	1	0+3	0	0	0
20	MF	(Paraguay) PAR	Andrés Cubas	41	0	25+1	0	5	0	1+1	0	6+2	0
22	MF	(Canada) CAN	Ali Ahmed	39	4	12+10	0	5	1	2+1	3	8+1	0
25	MF	(Scotland) SCO	Ryan Gauld	15	3	3+3	1	0+5	0	0+1	1	2+1	1
26	MF	(Cameroon) CMR	J.C. Ngando	38	3	13+12	2	0	0	3+1	1	5+4	0
43	MF	(Canada) CAN	Antoine Coupland	2	1	0+2	1	0	0	0	0	0	0
44	MF	(United States) USA	Jackson Castro	1	0	0+1	0	0	0	0	0	0	0
59	MF	(Canada) CAN	Jeevan Badwal	33	1	9+16	1	0+2	0	3+1	0	0+2	0
97	MF	(Canada) CAN	Liam Mackenzie	1	0	1	0	0	0	0	0	0	0
Forwards
7	FW	(Canada) CAN	Jayden Nelson	40	3	15+8	2	0+5	0	4+1	1	3+4	0
11	FW	(United States) USA	Emmanuel Sabbi	42	9	23+5	7	5	1	2+2	1	1+4	0
14	FW	(Mexico) MEX	Daniel Ríos	43	4	16+15	3	2	1	3	0	4+3	0
24	FW	(United States) USA	Brian White	36	25	18+3	16	3	2	2+1	1	6+3	6
42	FW	(Haiti) HAI	Nelson Pierre	3	1	0+3	1	0	0	0	0	0	0
63	FW	(Canada) CAN	Johnny Selemani	1	0	0+1	0	0	0	0	0	0	0
75	FW	(Tunisia) TUN	Rayan Elloumi	12	2	2+5	2	0+3	0	1+1	0	0	0
Players transferred out during the season
15	DF	(Norway) NOR	Bjørn Inge Utvik	22	1	12+4	0	0	0	3	1	1+2	0
19	FW	(Croatia) CRO	Damir Kreilach	5	1	0+4	1	0	0	1	0	0	0
45	MF	(Ecuador) ECU	Pedro Vite	29	5	16+3	4	0	0	1	0	7+2	1
52	FW	(Canada) CAN	Nicolas Fleuriau Chateau	2	0	0+2	0	0	0	0	0	0	0

Source: Competitions

=== Goalscorers ===
As of December 1, 2025

Rank	No.	Pos	Nat	Name	MLS	MLS Playoffs	Canadian Championship	Champions Cup	Total
1	24	FW	(United States)	Brian White	16	2	1	6	25
2	11	FW	(United States)	Emmanuel Sabbi	7	1	1	0	9
2	13	MF	(Germany)	Thomas Müller	7	1	1	0	9
4	16	MF	(United States)	Sebastian Berhalter	4	0	1	3	8
5	2	DF	(Uruguay)	Mathías Laborda	5	1	0	0	6
6	33	DF	(United States)	Tristan Blackmon	2	0	2	1	5
6	45	MF	(Ecuador)	Pedro Vite	4	0	0	1	5
8	14	FW	(Mexico)	Daniel Ríos	3	1	0	0	4
8	22	MF	(Canada)	Ali Ahmed	0	1	3	0	4
10	3	DF	(Canada)	Sam Adekugbe	2	0	1	0	3
10	7	FW	(Canada)	Jayden Nelson	2	0	1	0	3
10	18	DF	(Colombia)	Édier Ocampo	2	0	0	1	3
10	25	MF	(Scotland)	Ryan Gauld	1	0	1	1	3
10	26	FW	(Cameroon)	J.C. Ngando	2	0	1	0	3
15	17	MF	(Peru)	Kenji Cabrera	1	1	0	0	2
15	75	FW	(Tunisia)	Rayan Elloumi	2	0	0	0	2
17	6	MF	(Canada)	Ralph Priso	0	1	0	0	1
17	12	DF	(Syria)	Belal Halbouni	0	0	0	1	1
17	15	DF	(Norway)	Bjørn Inge Utvik	0	0	1	0	1
17	19	FW	(Croatia)	Damir Kreilach	1	0	0	0	1
17	28	DF	(United States)	Tate Johnson	1	0	0	0	1
17	42	FW	(Haiti)	Nelson Pierre	1	0	0	0	1
17	43	MF	(Canada)	Antoine Coupland	1	0	0	0	1
17	59	MF	(Canada)	Jeevan Badwal	1	0	0	0	1
Own goals					1	1	0	0	2
Totals					66	10	14	14	104

=== Clean sheets ===
As of December 1, 2025

Rank	No.	Pos	Nat	Name	MLS	MLS Playoffs	Canadian Championship	Champions Cup	Total
1	1	GK	(Japan)	Yohei Takaoka	13	1	0	2	16
2	32	GK	(Canada)	Isaac Boehmer	0	0	1	0	1
Totals					13	1	1	2	17

=== Disciplinary record ===
As of December 1, 2025

No.	Pos	Nat	Player	MLS			MLS Playoffs			Canadian Championship			Champions Cup			Total		
No.	Pos	Nat	Player	Yellow card	(yellow card) (yellow-red card)	Red card	Yellow card	(yellow card) (yellow-red card)	Red card	Yellow card	(yellow card) (yellow-red card)	Red card	Yellow card	(yellow card) (yellow-red card)	Red card	Yellow card	(yellow card) (yellow-red card)	Red card
1	GK	(Japan)	Yohei Takaoka	0	0	0	1	0	0	0	0	0	0	0	0	1	0	0
2	DF	(Uruguay)	Mathías Laborda	5	0	1	1	0	0	0	0	0	2	0	0	8	0	1
3	DF	(Canada)	Sam Adekugbe	0	0	0	0	0	0	0	0	0	0	0	0	0	0	0
4	DF	(Serbia)	Ranko Veselinović	1	0	0	0	0	0	0	0	0	1	0	0	2	0	0
6	MF	(Canada)	Ralph Priso	5	0	0	1	0	0	0	0	0	0	0	0	6	0	0
7	FW	(Canada)	Jayden Nelson	2	1	0	0	0	0	0	0	0	1	0	0	3	1	0
11	FW	(United States)	Emmanuel Sabbi	4	0	0	0	0	0	0	0	0	0	0	0	4	0	0
12	DF	(Syria)	Belal Halbouni	4	0	0	0	0	0	0	0	0	0	0	0	4	0	0
13	MF	(Germany)	Thomas Müller	1	0	0	1	0	0	0	0	0	0	0	0	2	0	0
14	FW	(Mexico)	Daniel Ríos	2	0	0	0	0	0	0	0	0	1	0	0	3	0	0
15	DF	(Germany)	Sebastian Schonlau	0	0	0	0	0	0	0	0	0	0	0	0	0	0	0
15	DF	(Norway)	Bjørn Inge Utvik	1	0	0	0	0	0	0	0	0	0	0	0	1	0	0
16	MF	(United States)	Sebastian Berhalter	6	0	0	2	0	0	0	0	0	3	0	0	11	0	0
17	MF	(Peru)	Kenji Cabrera	0	0	0	0	0	0	1	0	0	0	0	0	1	0	0
18	DF	(Colombia)	Édier Ocampo	8	1	0	2	0	0	0	0	0	1	0	0	11	1	0
19	FW	(Croatia)	Damir Kreilach	0	0	0	0	0	0	0	0	0	0	0	0	0	0	0
20	MF	(Paraguay)	Andrés Cubas	9	0	0	3	0	0	0	0	0	2	0	0	14	0	0
22	MF	(Canada)	Ali Ahmed	2	0	0	0	0	0	0	0	0	1	0	0	3	0	0
23	DF	(Belgium)	Joedrick Pupe	0	0	0	0	0	0	0	0	0	0	0	0	0	0	0
24	FW	(United States)	Brian White	3	0	0	1	0	0	0	0	0	2	0	0	6	0	0
25	MF	(Scotland)	Ryan Gauld	1	0	0	0	0	0	0	0	0	0	0	0	1	0	0
26	MF	(Cameroon)	J.C. Ngando	1	0	0	0	0	0	0	0	0	0	0	0	1	0	0
27	DF	(Australia)	Giuseppe Bovalina	0	0	0	0	0	0	0	0	0	0	0	0	0	0	0
28	DF	(United States)	Tate Johnson	4	0	0	1	0	0	0	0	0	1	0	0	6	0	0
30	GK	(United States)	Adrian Zendejas	0	0	0	0	0	0	0	0	0	0	0	0	0	0	0
32	GK	(Canada)	Isaac Boehmer	0	0	0	0	0	0	1	0	0	0	0	0	1	0	0
33	DF	(United States)	Tristan Blackmon	4	0	0	1	1	0	1	0	0	2	0	0	8	1	0
42	FW	(Haiti)	Nelson Pierre	0	0	0	0	0	0	0	0	0	0	0	0	0	0	0
45	MF	(Ecuador)	Pedro Vite	1	0	0	0	0	0	0	0	0	1	0	0	2	0	0
50	GK	(Canada)	Max Anchor	0	0	0	0	0	0	0	0	0	0	0	0	0	0	0
52	FW	(Canada)	Nicolas Fleuriau Chateau	0	0	0	0	0	0	0	0	0	0	0	0	0	0	0
53	DF	(United States)	Mark O'Neill	0	0	0	0	0	0	0	0	0	0	0	0	0	0	0
59	MF	(Canada)	Jeevan Badwal	1	0	0	0	0	0	2	0	0	0	0	0	3	0	0
75	FW	(Tunisia)	Rayan Elloumi	0	0	0	0	0	0	0	0	0	0	0	0	0	0	0
97	MF	(Canada)	Liam Mackenzie	0	0	0	0	0	0	0	0	0	0	0	0	0	0	0
Totals				65	2	1	14	1	0	5	0	0	18	0	0	102	3	1
