= MLS Cup 2025 =

2025 edition of the MLS Cup

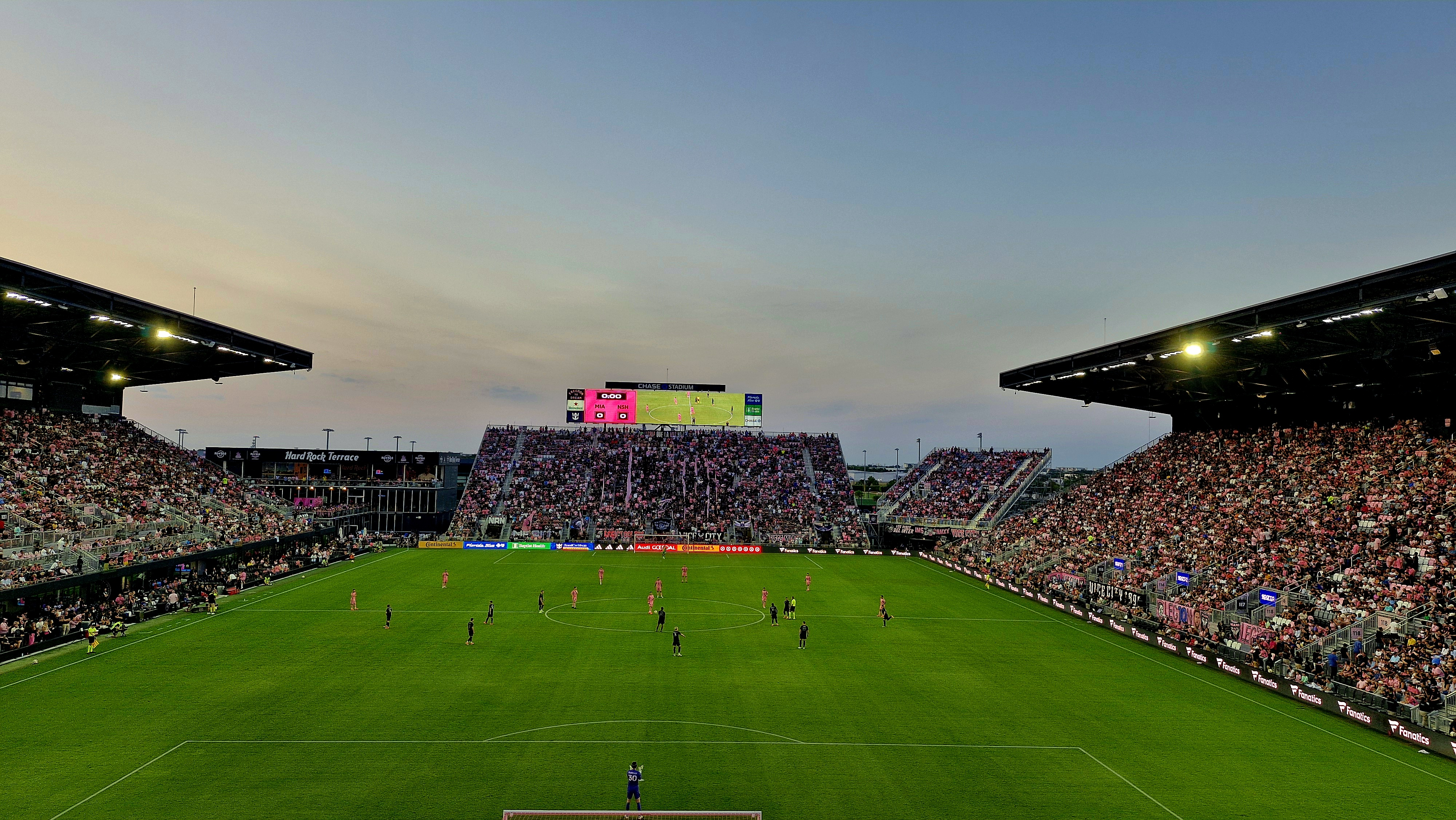
- Chase Stadium, the host venue
- Event: MLS Cup
Inter Miami CF	Vancouver Whitecaps FC
3	1
- Date: December 6, 2025
- Venue: Chase Stadium, Fort Lauderdale, Florida, U.S.
- MLS Cup MVP: Lionel Messi (Inter Miami CF)
- Referee: Drew Fischer
- Attendance: 21,556
- Weather: Sunny; 84 °F (29 °C); 60% humidity

MLS Cup 2025 was the 30th edition of the MLS Cup, the championship match of Major League Soccer (MLS), the top-flight soccer league in the United States and Canada. The match was played on December 6, 2025, at Chase Stadium in Fort Lauderdale, Florida, United States, and determined the champions of the 2025 season. It was hosted by Eastern Conference champions Inter Miami CF and played against Western Conference champions Vancouver Whitecaps FC. The match also marked the conclusion of the MLS Cup playoffs, which was contested by the top nine teams in each conference based on their regular season records.

Inter Miami CF won 3–1 with two assists by Lionel Messi, who was named the match's most valuable player, and clinched their first MLS Cup title.

== Road to the final ==
The MLS Cup is the post-season championship of Major League Soccer (MLS), the top-flight club soccer league in the United States and Canada. The 2025 season was the 30th in MLS history, and was contested by 30 teams organized into the eastern and western conferences. Each team played 34 matches during the regular season, which runs from February to October, twice against each intra-conference opponent and six times for inter-conference opposition in an unbalanced schedule. The regular season included a month-long break for the FIFA Club World Cup and CONCACAF Gold Cup, which were both hosted by the United States. The nine clubs in each conference with the most points qualified for the MLS Cup playoffs, which was played over five rounds from October to December. Most rounds were a single-elimination match hosted by the higher-seeded team; the exception was round one, which was a best-of-three series with the first and third (if necessary) match hosted by the higher-seeded team.

Both of the finalists, Inter Miami CF and Vancouver Whitecaps FC, were appearing in their first MLS Cup final, having joined MLS as expansion teams. They had faced each other earlier that year in the semifinals of the CONCACAF Champions Cup; Vancouver won 2–0 in the first leg at home and 3–1 in the second leg away for an aggregate score of 5–1. The Whitecaps were also the first Canadian team since Toronto FC in the 2019 edition to reach the league's championship.

Two of Miami's veteran European players, Jordi Alba and Sergio Busquets, had announced their intent to retire from professional soccer at the end of the season.

=== Summary of results ===
Note: In all results below, the score of the finalist is given first (H: home; A: away).

Inter Miami CF				Round	Vancouver Whitecaps FC			
3rd place in Eastern Conference MLS Eastern Conference table (2025): Pos / Team / Pld / Pts; 1 / Philadelphia Union / 34 / 66; 2 / FC Cincinnati / 34 / 65; 3 / Inter Miami CF (C) / 34 / 65; 4 / Charlotte FC / 34 / 59; 5 / New York City FC / 34 / 56; 6 / Nashville SC / 34 / 54; 7 / Columbus Crew / 34 / 54; 8 / Chicago Fire FC / 34 / 53; 9 / Orlando City SC / 34 / 53; Source: MLS (C) MLS Cup champions Qualified for playoffs Qualified for CONCACAF Champions Cup				Regular season	2nd place in Western Conference MLS Western Conference table (2025): Pos / Team / Pld / Pts; 1 / San Diego FC / 34 / 63; 2 / Vancouver Whitecaps FC / 34 / 63; 3 / Los Angeles FC / 34 / 60; 4 / Minnesota United FC / 34 / 58; 5 / Seattle Sounders FC / 34 / 55; 6 / Austin FC / 34 / 47; 7 / FC Dallas / 34 / 44; 8 / Portland Timbers / 34 / 44; 9 / Real Salt Lake / 34 / 41; Source: MLS Qualified for playoffs Qualified for CONCACAF Champions Cup			
Opponent (Games)	1st leg	2nd leg	3rd leg	MLS Cup playoffs	Opponent (Games)	1st leg	2nd leg	3rd leg
Nashville SC (2–1)	3–1 (H)	1–2 (A)	4–0 (H)	Round one	FC Dallas (2–0)	3–0 (H)	1–1 (4–2 p) (A)	—
Opponent	Score				Opponent	Score		
FC Cincinnati	4–0 (A)			Conference semifinals	Los Angeles FC	2–2 (a.e.t.) (4–3 p) (H)		
New York City FC	5–1 (H)			Conference finals	San Diego FC	3–1 (A)		

== Venue ==
MLS Cup 2025 was hosted by Inter Miami CF at their home venue, Chase Stadium in Fort Lauderdale, Florida. Miami won the right to host the match by virtue of their higher finish in the regular season standings; Miami had 65 points, while Vancouver earned 63 points. Chase Stadium was a soccer-specific stadium wuth a capacity of 21,550 spectators, and was constructed as a temporary stadium for Inter Miami CF until the completion of Nu Stadium near Miami International Airport in 2026. The stadium had been expanded with temporary bleachers immediately following the signing of Lionel Messi by the club in 2023. MLS Cup 2025 was the final scheduled match for Inter Miami CF at Chase Stadium, as the team moved to Nu Stadium at the beginning of the 2026 season.

Inter Miami CF announced a two-day presale of tickets for the match for season ticket holders beginning on December 1, which was followed by a release of tickets to the general public on December 2. The lowest prices on the resale market had been $831 prior to the conference finals, but later ranged from $359 to $2,211 at the end of the public sale; by December 5, the lowest ticket price was $179. Ticket retailer TickPick estimated that the average cost of a ticket on its platform for the 2025 final was $464, the second-highest figure for an MLS Cup after the 2022 final in Los Angeles.

The Whitecaps hosted a watch party at their home stadium, BC Place, for the MLS Cup final using its large video screens. By December 2, the team had already sold 16,000 tickets for the event. BC Place had 20,452 total spectators, setting a record for the largest audience for an MLS Cup watch party.

== Broadcasting ==
The MLS Cup final was broadcast worldwide in English and Spanish on MLS Season Pass, a subscription streaming service operated by Apple. The MLS Season Pass commentary team was led in English by play-by-play announcer Jake Zivin and analyst Taylor Twellman; the Spanish team was led by Sammy Sadovnik and Diego Valeri. The service was also carrying pre-game and post-game shows from a studio crew. The match was also being broadcast on U.S. terrestrial television by Fox Sports in English and Fox Deportes in Spanish. The Canadian television broadcast was carried by TSN in English and Réseau des sports (RDS) in French. In Mexico, the match was broadcast on TNT Sports. MLS Productions used more than thirty cameras to broadcast MLS Cup 2025, including a referee cam and footage from four iPhone 17 Pro Max smartphones for fan reactions. The match was also displayed on a digital billboard in Times Square, New York City.

According to MLS, a total of 4.6 million viewers watched the match across all television and streaming platforms that carried MLS Cup 2025. The Fox and Fox Deportes broadcast had 994,000 viewers according to preliminary data from Nielsen Media Research; approximately 283,000 viewers watched the Canadian broadcast on TSN and RDS.

== Match ==
=== Details ===
December 6, 2025
2:30 p.m. EST

Inter Miami CF	3–1	Vancouver Whitecaps FC
Ocampo 8' (o.g.); De Paul 71'; Allende 90+6'	Report	Ahmed 60'

Chase Stadium, Fort Lauderdale, Florida
Attendance: 21,556
Referee: Drew Fischer

Inter Miami CF	Vancouver Whitecaps FC

GK	34	(Argentina) Rocco Ríos Novo	(yellow card) 90+9'
RB	17	(Jamaica) Ian Fray		(substituted off) 90+1'
CB	37	(Uruguay) Maximiliano Falcón	(yellow card) 48'
CB	32	(Greece) Noah Allen
LB	18	(Spain) Jordi Alba
CM	7	(Argentina) Rodrigo De Paul	(yellow card) 86'
CM	5	(Spain) Sergio Busquets
CM	11	(Argentina) Baltasar Rodríguez	(yellow card) 13'	(substituted off) 57'
RF	21	(Argentina) Tadeo Allende
CF	10	(Argentina) Lionel Messi (c)
LF	24	(Argentina) Mateo Silvetti		(substituted off) 78'
Substitutes:
GK	19	(Argentina) Oscar Ustari
DF	2	(Argentina) Gonzalo Luján
DF	6	(Argentina) Tomás Avilés
DF	57	(Argentina) Marcelo Weigandt		(substituted on) 90+1'
MF	8	(Venezuela) Telasco Segovia		(substituted on) 57'
MF	42	(Italy) Yannick Bright		(substituted on) 78'
FW	9	(Uruguay) Luis Suárez
FW	14	(Haiti) Fafà Picault
FW	29	(Ecuador) Allen Obando
Manager:
(Argentina) Javier Mascherano

GK	1	(Japan) Yohei Takaoka
RB	18	(Colombia) Édier Ocampo	(yellow card) 45'
CB	33	(United States) Tristan Blackmon	(yellow card) 66'
CB	6	(Canada) Ralph Priso		(substituted off) 68'
LB	2	(Uruguay) Mathías Laborda	(yellow card) 86'
CM	16	(United States) Sebastian Berhalter	(yellow card) 90+4'
CM	20	(Paraguay) Andrés Cubas	(yellow card) 74'	(substituted off) 82'
RW	11	(United States) Emmanuel Sabbi		(substituted off) 90+1'
AM	13	(Germany) Thomas Müller (c)
LW	22	(Canada) Ali Ahmed		(substituted off) 68'
CF	24	(United States) Brian White	(yellow card) 17'
Substitutes:
GK	32	(Canada) Isaac Boehmer
DF	23	(Belgium) Joedrick Pupe		(substituted on) 68'
DF	28	(United States) Tate Johnson
MF	17	(Peru) Kenji Cabrera		(substituted on) 82'
MF	25	(Scotland) Ryan Gauld		(substituted on) 68'
MF	59	(Canada) Jeevan Badwal
FW	7	(Canada) Jayden Nelson		(substituted on) 90+1'
FW	14	(Mexico) Daniel Ríos
FW	75	(Tunisia) Rayan Elloumi
Manager:
(Denmark) Jesper Sørensen

MLS Cup MVP: Lionel Messi (Inter Miami CF)

Assistant referees:
Cory Richardson
Nick Uranga
Fourth official:
Pierre-Luc Lauzière
Reserve assistant referee:
Jeremy Kieso
Video assistant referee:
Carol Anne Chénard
Assistant video assistant referee:
Tom Supple

Match rules

- 90 minutes
- 30 minutes of extra time if necessary
- Penalty shoot-out if scores still level
- Maximum of nine named substitutes
- Maximum of five substitutions
- Maximum of three substitution opportunities

== Post-match ==
Inter Miami CF became the sixteenth different MLS team to win the league championship, and the fifth unique winner in the past five editions. Miami captain Lionel Messi was named the MLS Cup Most Valuable Player after registering two assists during the match, and won his 47th career trophy. He also broke the record for the most combined goals and assists in an MLS playoff campaign, with fifteen total goal contributions (six goals and nine assists). Miami co-owner David Beckham became the first person to win the MLS Cup as both a player—having won twice with the LA Galaxy in 2011 and 2012—and owner. Tadeo Allende's goal in stoppage time was his ninth during the 2025 playoffs, surpassing the eight scored by Carlos Ruiz in 2002 as the most by a player in a single edition of the MLS Cup playoffs. Miami's twenty goals scored across the 2025 playoffs was also a new record, overtaking the previous best of eighteen set by the LA Galaxy a year prior.

As MLS Cup champions, Inter Miami CF earned a bye to the round of 16 of the 2026 CONCACAF Champions Cup. The team were hosted at the White House by president Donald Trump on March 5, 2026. Trump was presented with a jersey, soccer ball, and watch by Inter Miami managing owner Jorge Mas.
