= Giuseppe Bovalina =

Australian soccer player (born 2004)

Personal information
- Date of birth: 11 November 2004 (age 22)
- Place of birth: Adelaide, Australia
- Height: 5 ft 8 in (1.73 m)
- Position: Right-back

Team information
- Current team: Örebro SK (on loan from Vancouver Whitecaps FC)
- Number: 20

Youth career
- Western Strikers
- Croydon Kings
- Football SA NTC

Senior career*
| Years | Team | Apps | (Gls) |
| 2021–2024 | Adelaide United NPL | 48 | (9) |
| 2023–2024 | Adelaide United | 23 | (1) |
| 2024– | Vancouver Whitecaps FC | 26 | (0) |
| 2024–2025 | → Whitecaps FC 2 (loan) | 10 | (1) |
| 2026– | → Örebro SK (loan) | 22 | (0) |

International career^{‡}
| 2024– | Australia U23 | 6 | (0) |
Medal record
Men's football
Representing Australia
WAFF U-23 Championship
| Runner-up | 2024 Saudi Arabia |
- * Club domestic league appearances and goals as of 12 November 2026 ‡ National team caps and goals as of 14 January 2026

Giuseppe Bovalina (born 11 November 2004) is an Australian professional soccer player who plays as a right-back for Superettan club Örebro SK, on loan from Major League Soccer club Vancouver Whitecaps FC.

== Early life ==
Bovalina played youth soccer with Western Strikers SC from Under-6 to Under-8 level, Croydon FC from Under-9 to Under-12 level, and the Football South Australia NTC program from Under-13 to Under-18 level.

== Club career ==
In 2021, Bovalina joined the Adelaide United FC Youth in the National Premier Leagues South Australia.

On 14 August 2023, he made his debut for the Adelaide United FC first team in an Australia Cup match against Northcote City. In September 2023, Bovalina signed a scholarship contract with the first team. He scored his first A-League goal on 4 December 2023 against Macarthur FC.

In April 2024, Bovalina signed with Vancouver Whitecaps FC in Major League Soccer through 2026, with options for 2027 and 2028. He made his debut on 7 May 2024 in a 2024 Canadian Championship match against Cavalry FC. Bovalina scored his first goal in a friendly match against Welsh club Wrexham on 27 July 2024.

On 3 February 2026, Bovalina was sent on loan to Superettan club Örebro SK for the 2026 season.

== International career ==
In March 2024, Bovalina earned his first national team call-up, being named to the Australia U23 for the 2024 WAFF U-23 Championship. On 23 March 2024, he made his debut in the semi-final against Egypt U23. In May 2025, he was again called up to the U23 squad.

== Career statistics ==
As of 31 December 2025

Appearances and goals by club, season and competition
| Club | Season | League | | | Playoffs | | Cup | | Continental | | Other | | Total | |
| Club | Season | Division | Apps | Goals | Apps | Goals | Apps | Goals | Apps | Goals | Apps | Goals | Apps | Goals |
|---|---|---|---|---|---|---|---|---|---|---|---|---|---|---|
| Adelaide United Youth | 2021 | NPL South Australia | 7 | 0 | — | | — | | — | | — | | 7 | 0 |
| Adelaide United Youth | 2022 | NPL South Australia | 19 | 4 | 1 | 1 | — | | — | | — | | 20 | 5 |
| Adelaide United Youth | 2023 | NPL South Australia | 21 | 4 | 3 | 1 | — | | — | | — | | 24 | 5 |
| Adelaide United Youth | 2024 | NPL South Australia | 1 | 1 | 0 | 0 | — | | — | | — | | 1 | 1 |
| Adelaide United Youth | Total | | 48 | 9 | 4 | 2 | — | | — | | — | | 52 | 11 |
| Adelaide United | 2023–24 | A-League | 21 | 1 | — | | 2 | 0 | — | | — | | 23 | 1 |
| Vancouver Whitecaps FC | 2024 | Major League Soccer | 11 | 0 | 0 | 0 | 3 | 0 | 0 | 0 | 2 (Note: Appearances in Leagues Cup) | 0 | 16 | 0 |
| Vancouver Whitecaps FC | 2025 | Major League Soccer | 7 | 0 | 1 | 0 | 2 | 0 | 0 | 0 | — | | 10 | 0 |
| Vancouver Whitecaps FC | Total | | 39 | 0 | 1 | 0 | 5 | 0 | 0 | 0 | 2 | 0 | 26 | 0 |
| Whitecaps FC 2 (loan) | 2024 | MLS Next Pro | 5 | 0 | 1 | 0 | — | | — | | — | | 6 | 0 |
| Whitecaps FC 2 (loan) | 2025 | MLS Next Pro | 2 | 1 | — | | — | | — | | — | | 2 | 1 |
| Whitecaps FC 2 (loan) | Total | | 7 | 1 | 1 | 0 | — | | — | | — | | 8 | 1 |
| Career total | | | 94 | 11 | 6 | 2 | 7 | 0 | 0 | 0 | 2 | 0 | 109 | 13 |

== Honours ==
Australia U-23

- WAFF U-23 Championship: runner-up 2024
