= Tate Johnson =

American soccer player (born 2005)

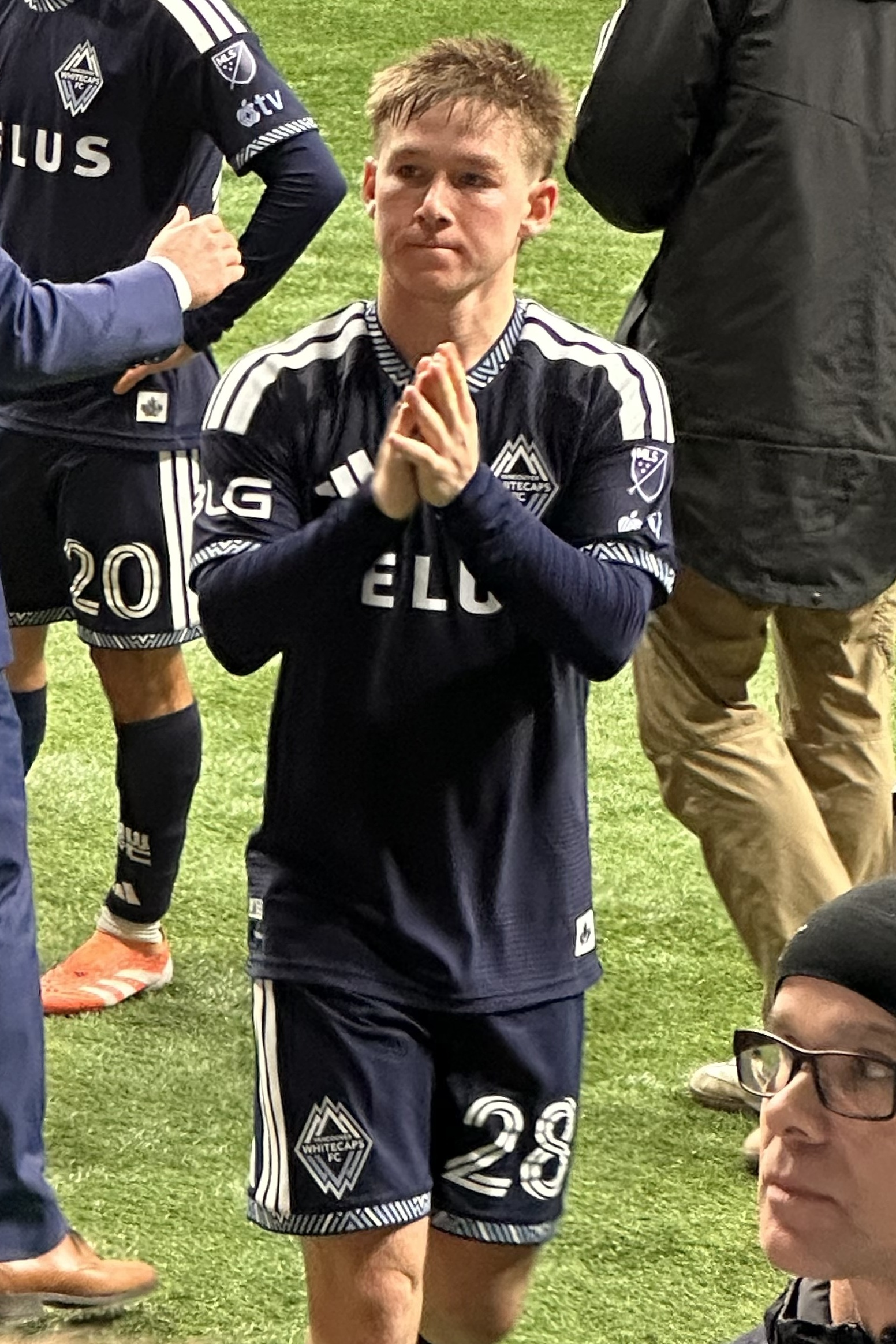
- Johnson in 2026

Personal information
- Date of birth: July 10, 2005 (age 21)
- Place of birth: Salt Lake City, Utah, U.S.
- Height: 5 ft 8 in (1.73 m)
- Position: Defender

Team information
- Current team: Vancouver Whitecaps FC
- Number: 28

Youth career
- Indiana Fire Academy
- Tampa Bay United

College career
Years	Team	Apps	(Gls)
2024	North Carolina Tar Heels	17	(1)

Senior career*
Years	Team	Apps	(Gls)
2021–2022	Tampa Bay United	2	(0)
2022–2023	Tampa Bay Rowdies	7	(0)
2023	Crown Legacy FC	10	(0)
2024	Tampa Bay United	6	(0)
2025–	Vancouver Whitecaps FC	57	(1)

International career^{‡}
2025	United States U20	2	(0)
2026–	United States U21	1	(0)
- * Club domestic league appearances and goals as of October 21, 2026 ‡ National team caps and goals as of October 21, 2026

Tate Johnson (born July 10, 2005) is an American soccer player who plays as a defender for Major League Soccer club Vancouver Whitecaps FC.

== Early life ==
Johnson played youth soccer with the Indiana Fire Academy, before moving to Florida to play with Tampa Bay United.

== College career ==
In 2024, Johnson began attending the University of North Carolina, where he played for the men's soccer team. He made his debut on August 22 against the UAB Blazers. On October 8, 2024, he scored his first collegiate goal in a match against the Charleston Cougars. At the end of the season, he was named to the Atlantic Coast Conference All-Freshman Team.

== Club career ==
In 2021 and 2022, Johnson played with Tampa Bay United in USL League Two.

In April 2022, Johnson signed a USL Academy contract with the Tampa Bay Rowdies of the USL Championship to enable him to play for the first team at the professional level. He made his debut on April 5, 2022, in a U.S. Open Cup match against The Villages SC. In February 2023, he signed another USL Academy contract with the Rowdies.

Later in 2023, he moved to Crown Legacy FC in MLS Next Pro.

In 2024, he once again played with Tampa Bay United in USL League Two.

Ahead of the 2025 MLS SuperDraft, Johnson signed a Generation Adidas contract with Major League Soccer. He was then selected the first round (15th overall) by Vancouver Whitecaps FC. On March 5, 2025, he made his debut for the club in the 2025 CONCACAF Champions Cup against Mexican side CF Monterrey. On March 8, 2025, he scored his first goal in his MLS debut, in a victory over CF Montréal. Due to Sam Adekugbe's season-ending injury, Johnson made 29 of 34 appearances at left back for the Vancouver Whitecaps in the regular season, as they lost to Inter Miami CF in the MLS Cup 2025.

On August 28, 2026, Johnson signed an extension through the 2029–30 Major League Soccer season, with a club option for the 2030–31 season.

== Personal life ==
Johnson is the son of former professional soccer player Brian Johnson.

== Career statistics ==
As of match played October 17, 2026

Appearances and goals by club, season and competition
Club	Season	League			Playoffs		National cup (Note: Includes U.S. Open Cup, Canadian Championship)		Continental		Other		Total	
Club	Season	Division	Apps	Goals	Apps	Goals	Apps	Goals	Apps	Goals	Apps	Goals	Apps	Goals
Tampa Bay United	2021	USL League Two	1	0	0	0	—		—		—		1	0
Tampa Bay United	2022	USL League Two	1	0	—		—		—		—		1	0
Tampa Bay United	Total		2	0	0	0	—		—		—		2	0
Tampa Bay Rowdies	2022	USL Championship	3	0	0	0	1	0	—		—		4	0
Tampa Bay Rowdies	2023	USL Championship	4	0	0	0	2	0	—		—		6	0
Tampa Bay Rowdies	Total		7	0	0	0	3	0	—		—		10	0
Crown Legacy FC	2023	MLS Next Pro	10	0	0	0	—		—		—		10	0
Tampa Bay United	2024	USL League Two	6	0	—		—		—		—		6	0
Vancouver Whitecaps FC	2025	Major League Soccer	29	1	3 (Note: Appearances in MLS Cup playoffs)	0	4	0	6 (Note: Appearances in CONCACAF Champions Cup)	0	0	0	42	1
Vancouver Whitecaps FC	2026	Major League Soccer	28	0	0	0	4	0	4	0	2 (Note: Appearances in Leagues Cup)	0	38	0
Vancouver Whitecaps FC	Total		57	1	3	0	8	0	4	0	8	0	80	1
Career total			82	1	3	0	11	0	4	0	8	0	108	1
