= Kenji Cabrera =

Peruvian footballer (born 2003)

Kenji Cabrera ケンジ・カブレラ
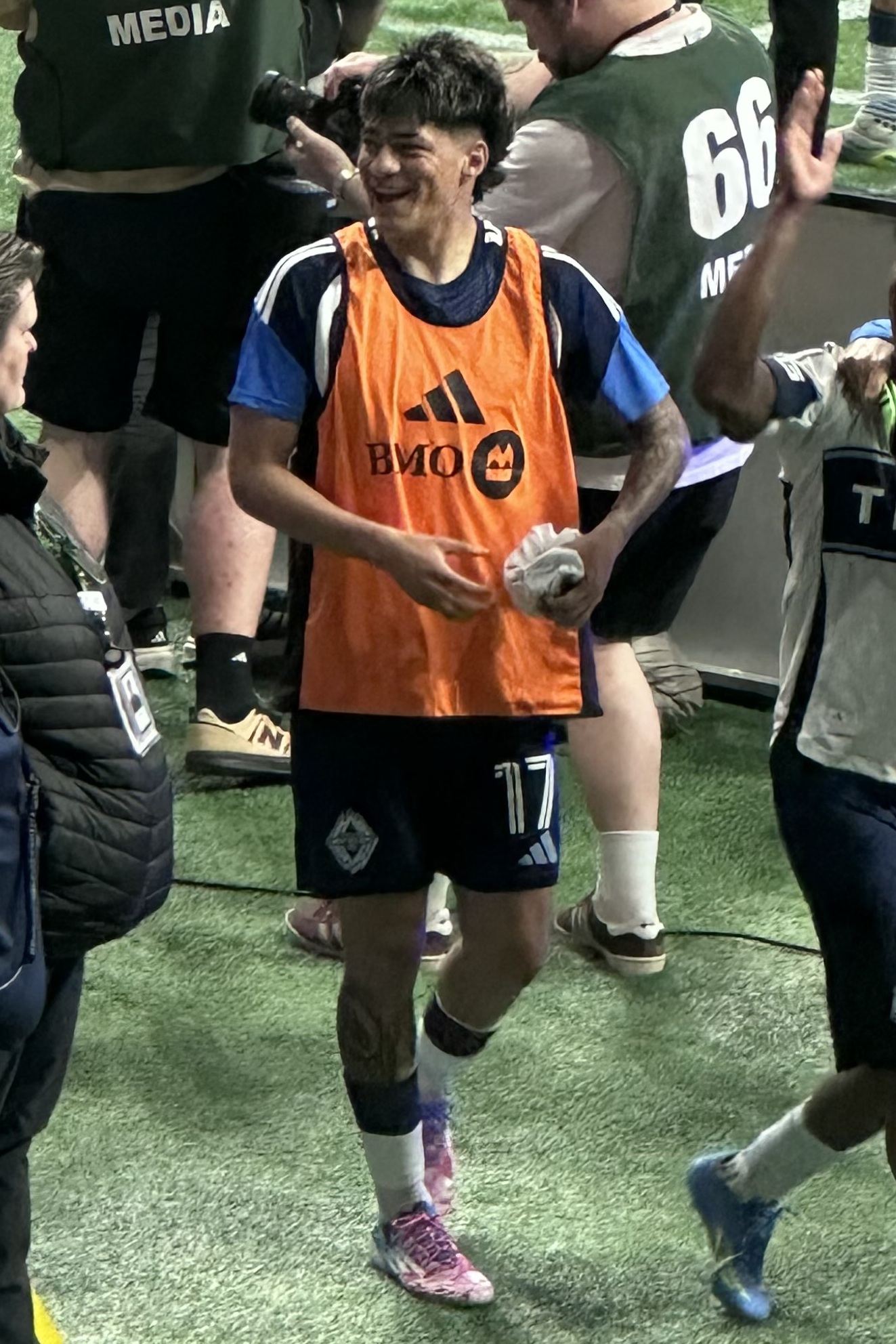
- Cabrera in 2026

Personal information
- Full name: Kenji Giovanni Cabrera Nakamura
- Date of birth: 27 January 2003 (age 23)
- Place of birth: Shiga, Japan
- Height: 1.74 m (5 ft 9 in)
- Positions: Attacking midfielder; left winger

Team information
- Current team: Vancouver Whitecaps FC
- Number: 17

Youth career
- Esther Grande
- Alianza Lima

Senior career*
Years	Team	Apps	(Gls)
2021–2025	FBC Melgar	98	(13)
2025–	Vancouver Whitecaps FC	15	(1)

International career^{‡}
2022–2023	Peru U20	14	(0)
2025–	Peru	7	(0)
- * Club domestic league appearances and goals as of May 23, 2026 ‡ National team caps and goals as of 23:13, 5 June 2026 (UTC)

Kenji Giovanni Cabrera Nakamura (中村ジョバンニカブレラ健司, Nakamura Jobanni Kaburera Kenji; born 27 January 2003) is a professional footballer who plays as an attacking midfielder or left winger for Major League Soccer club Vancouver Whitecaps FC. Born in Japan, he represents the Peru national team.

== Club career ==
Born in Shiga, Japan to a Peruvian father and a Japanese mother, Cabrera started his career with Esther Grande, before a short spell in the Alianza Lima academy. He joined FBC Melgar in 2021, immediately being promoted to the first team, making his debut the same year.

In July 2025, Major League Soccer club Vancouver Whitecaps FC announced they had signed Cabrera to a deal through 2028, with an option for 2029. He made his debut for his new club on August 13 against Forge FC in the semi-finals of the 2025 Canadian Championship. On September 20, on his first start for the club, he scored his first MLS goal in the Whitecaps' 2–0 victory over Sporting Kansas City.

== International career ==
Cabrera was born in Japan to a Peruvian father and Japanese mother, and moved to Peru at a young age. He holds dual-citizenship. He has represented Peru at under-20 level.

On September 4, 2025, he made his debut for the senior Peru national team in an away defeat against Uruguay (3–0).

== Career statistics ==
=== Club ===
As of May 23, 2026

Appearances and goals by club, season and competition
Club	Season	League			Cup		Continental		Other		Total	
Club	Season	Division	Apps	Goals	Apps	Goals	Apps	Goals	Apps	Goals	Apps	Goals
FBC Melgar	2021	Peruvian Primera División	4	0	0	0	0	0	0	0	4	0
FBC Melgar	2022	Peruvian Primera División	20	1	0	0	8 (Note: Appearances in the Copa Sudamericana)	0	0	0	28	1
FBC Melgar	2023	Peruvian Primera División	30	2	0	0	5 (Note: Appearances in the Copa Libertadores)	0	0	0	35	2
FBC Melgar	2024	Peruvian Primera División	28	4	0	0	1	0	0	0	29	4
FBC Melgar	2025	Peruvian Primera División	16	6	0	0	10 (Note: Four appearances and one goal in Copa Libertadores, six appearances and two goals in Copa Sudamericana)	3	0	0	26	9
FBC Melgar	Total		98	13	0	0	24	3	0	0	122	16
Vancouver Whitecaps FC	2025	Major League Soccer	6	1	3 (Note: Appearances in Canadian Championship)	0	0	0	4 (Note: Appearances in MLS Cup Playoffs)	1	13	2
Vancouver Whitecaps FC	2026	Major League Soccer	9	0	0	0	4 (Note: Appearances in CONCACAF Champions Cup)	1	—		13	1
Vancouver Whitecaps FC	Total		15	1	3	0	4	1	4	1	26	2
Career total			113	14	3	0	28	4	4	1	148	19

=== International ===
As of match played 5 June 2026

Appearances and goals by national team and year
National team	Year	Apps	Goals
Peru	2025	4	0
Peru	2026	3	0
Total		7	0

== Honours ==
FBC Melgar

- Torneo Apertura 2022

Vancouver Whitecaps FC

- Canadian Championship: 2025
