= Ralph Priso =

Canadian soccer player (born 2002)

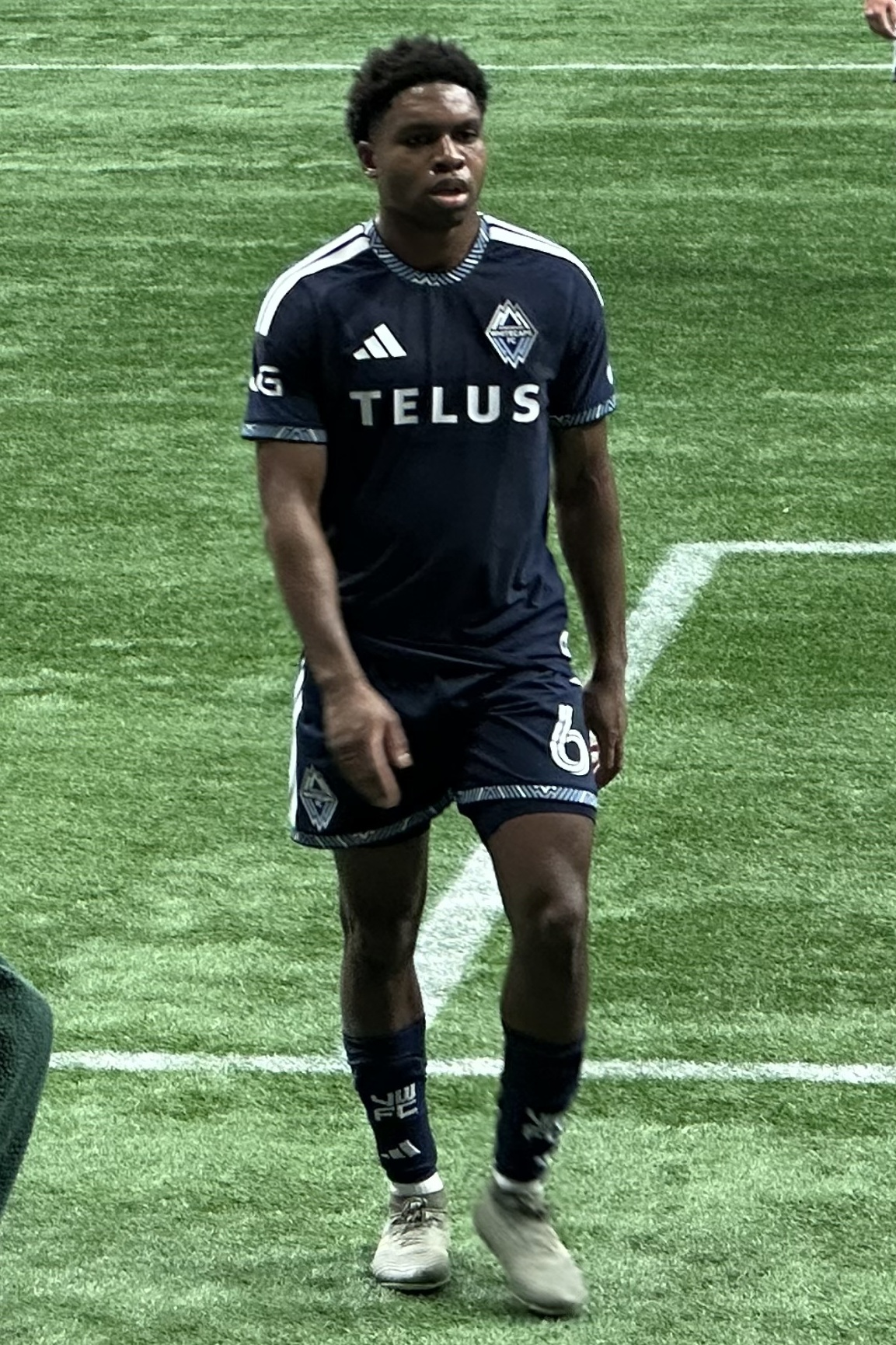
- Priso with Vancouver Whitecaps FC in 2026

Personal information
- Full name: Ralph-William Johnson Priso-Mbongue
- Date of birth: August 2, 2002 (age 24)
- Place of birth: Toronto, Ontario, Canada
- Height: 1.75 m (5 ft 9 in)
- Position: Defender

Team information
- Current team: Vancouver Whitecaps FC
- Number: 6

Youth career
- 2006–2013: Clairlea-Westview SC
- 2014–2016: North Toronto Nitros
- 2017–2019: Toronto FC

Senior career*
Years	Team	Apps	(Gls)
2018	Toronto FC III	6	(1)
2019	Toronto FC II	5	(0)
2020–2022	Toronto FC	25	(2)
2021–2022	→ Toronto FC II (loan)	4	(0)
2022–2024	Colorado Rapids	32	(0)
2022–2023	→ Colorado Rapids 2 (loan)	4	(0)
2024–	Vancouver Whitecaps FC	60	(1)
2024	→ Whitecaps FC 2 (loan)	2	(0)

International career^{‡}
2017	Canada U15	4	(0)
2019	Canada U17	6	(0)
2026	Canada B	1	(0)
2026–	Canada	7	(0)
- * Club domestic league appearances and goals as of November 7, 2026 ‡ National team caps and goals as of November 13, 2026

Ralph-William Johnson Priso-Mbongue (born August 2, 2002) is a Canadian soccer player who plays as a defender for Major League Soccer club Vancouver Whitecaps FC and the Canada national team.

== Early career ==
He began playing soccer at the age of four with Clairlea-Westview SC, before moving to the North Toronto Nitros when he was eleven. In 2016, he was invited to Adidas's Elite Soccer Program. He tried out for the Toronto FC Academy at ages 11, 12, and 13, failing to make the program, before finally being accepted in 2017, at age 14.

== Club career ==
=== Early career ===
In 2018, he played with Toronto FC III in the semi-professional League1 Ontario, making six appearances. He scored his first goal against Darby FC on July 17, 2018. On March 5, 2019, he signed his first professional contract, joining Toronto FC II in USL League One. His debut professional appearance came when he started against the Richmond Kickers on August 17, 2019.

=== Toronto FC ===
On October 14, 2020, he signed with first team Toronto FC, becoming the 25th player to sign as a Homegrown Player from the TFC Academy. He made his debut on October 24, coming on as a substitute for Nick DeLeon against the Philadelphia Union. He was loaned to the second team for some matches in 2021. On July 21, 2021, he scored his first goal for Toronto FC in a 1-1 draw against the New York Red Bulls. On August 19, Toronto FC announced Priso would undergo season-ending ankle surgery after suffering an injury on August 14 against the New England Revolution.

=== Colorado Rapids ===
In July 2022, Priso was traded from Toronto FC to fellow MLS club Colorado Rapids for Mark-Anthony Kaye. Colorado would also receive $1.025 million in General Allocation Money, and an international roster slot in the trade. He made his debut on July 17, against the LA Galaxy.

=== Vancouver Whitecaps ===
In March 2024, Priso was traded to the Vancouver Whitecaps FC in exchange for 1st and 3rd round MLS SuperDraft picks and up to $150,000 in General Allocation Money. He made his debut for the club on April 6 against his former club, Toronto FC. In December 2024, Priso signed a new contract with the Whitecaps for the 2025 season, with club options for 2026 and 2027. Late into the 2025 season, Priso was asked to play centre back for the first time in his career, a move which would see him praised for his play as the Whitecaps would make it to the MLS finals. In August 2026, Priso would sign a contract extension through the 2028-29 season, with an option for 2029-30.

== International career ==
In 2016, at age 13, he made his debut in the Canadian youth program at an identification camp with coach Ante Jazic. He represented Canada at the 2017 CONCACAF Boys' Under-15 Championship, serving as team captain. He played for the Canadian U17 team at the 2019 CONCACAF U-17 Championship and the 2019 FIFA U-17 World Cup.

He was called to the Canada national team camp for January 2021. In January 2026, he was named to the Canada senior team for a training camp and friendly against Guatemala. He appeared in the match against Guatemala, in his first senior appearance, however, as it was designated a B-level friendly, it did not count as an official senior cap.

== Personal life ==
Priso is of Cameroonian descent through his parents. He is the older brother of fellow professional soccer player Hugo Mbongue.

== Career statistics ==
=== Club ===
As of match played November 7, 2026

Appearances and goals by club, season and competition
Club	Season	League			Playoffs		National cup		League cup		Continental		Total	
Club	Season	Division	Apps	Goals	Apps	Goals	Apps	Goals	Apps	Goals	Apps	Goals	Apps	Goals
Toronto FC III	2018	League1 Ontario	6	1	—		—		2	0	—		8	1
Toronto FC II	2019	USL League One	5	0	—		—		—		—		5	0
Toronto FC	2020	MLS	4	0	1	0	0	0	—		—		5	0
Toronto FC	2021	MLS	11	1	—		0	0	—		4	0	15	1
Toronto FC	2022	MLS	10	1	0	0	3 (Note: Includes appearance in 2020 Canadian Championship final (played in 2022))	0	—		—		13	1
Toronto FC	Total		25	2	1	0	3	0	0	0	4	0	33	2
Toronto FC II (loan)	2021	USL League One	3	0	—		—		—		—		3	0
Toronto FC II (loan)	2022	MLS Next Pro	1	0	—		—		—		—		1	0
Toronto FC II (loan)	Total		4	0	0	0	0	0	0	0	0	0	4	0
Colorado Rapids	2022	MLS	6	0	—		—		—		—		6	0
Colorado Rapids	2023	MLS	26	0	—		2	0	2	0	—		30	0
Colorado Rapids	2024	MLS	0	0	—		—		0	0	—		0	0
Colorado Rapids	Total		32	0	0	0	2	0	2	0	0	0	36	0
Colorado Rapids 2 (loan)	2022	MLS Next Pro	3	0	—		—		—		—		3	0
Colorado Rapids 2 (loan)	2023	MLS Next Pro	1	0	—		—		—		—		1	0
Colorado Rapids 2 (loan)	Total		4	0	0	0	0	0	0	0	0	0	4	0
Vancouver Whitecaps FC	2024	MLS	14	0	1	0	3	0	2	0	0	0	20	0
Vancouver Whitecaps FC	2025	MLS	28	0	5	1	5	0	—		8	0	46	1
Vancouver Whitecaps FC	2026	MLS	18	1	0	0	1	0	3	0	3	0	25	1
Vancouver Whitecaps FC	Total		60	1	6	1	9	0	5	0	11	0	91	2
Whitecaps FC 2 (loan)	2024	MLS Next Pro	2	0	0	0	—		—		—		2	0
Career total			138	4	7	1	14	0	9	0	15	0	183	5

=== International ===
As of match played November 13, 2026

Appearances and goals by national team and year
National team	Year	Apps	Goals
Canada	2026	7	0
Total		7	0

== Honours ==
Toronto FC

- Canadian Championship: 2020

Vancouver Whitecaps FC

- Canadian Championship: 2024, 2025
