= Belal Halbouni =

Canadian-Syrian footballer (born 1999)

Personal information
- Date of birth: December 29, 1999 (age 26)
- Place of birth: London, Ontario, Canada
- Height: 1.88 m (6 ft 2 in)
- Position: Centre back

Team information
- Current team: Vancouver Whitecaps FC
- Number: 12

Youth career
- North London SC

College career
| Years | Team | Apps | (Gls) |
| 2018 | Western Mustangs | 16 | (2) |

Senior career*
| Years | Team | Apps | (Gls) |
| 2017–2019 | FC London | 28 | (3) |
| 2020–2022 | Werder Bremen II | 28 | (3) |
| 2022–2024 | 1. FC Magdeburg II | 8 | (1) |
| 2024– | Vancouver Whitecaps FC | 16 | (0) |
| 2024–2025 | → Whitecaps FC 2 (loan) | 5 | (1) |

International career^{‡}
| 2022 | Syria | 1 | (0) |
- * Club domestic league appearances and goals as of December 31, 2025 ‡ National team caps and goals as of 23 September 2022

Belal Halbouni (Arabic: بِلَال حَلبُونِيّ; born December 29, 1999) is a professional footballer who plays as a centre back for Major League Soccer club Vancouver Whitecaps FC. Born in Canada, he plays for the Syria national team.

== Early life ==
Halbouni was born in Canada to a Syrian father and a Lebanese mother. He began playing football at age four, and joined North London SC at age eight.

== University career ==
In 2018, he attended the University of Western Ontario, where he played for the men's soccer team. He scored his first goal on September 29 against the Algoma Thunderbirds. After one season, he decided to leave school to pursue professional soccer.

== Club career ==
=== FC London ===
From 2017 to 2019, he played with FC London in League1 Ontario. He scored his first goal on October 6, 2017 against ProStars FC. In 2019, he was converted from an attacker to centre-back.

=== Werder Bremen II ===
In January 2020, he signed a contract with Werder Bremen II of the Regionalliga Nord, the reserve side of Bundesliga club Werder Bremen. He made his debut on February 21, 2020 against HSC Hannover. In June 2021, he extended his contract with the side. During the 2021-22 season, he began serving as the captain of the reserve side. While with the club, he also trained with the first team. In January 2022, Major League Soccer club Vancouver Whitecaps FC had been interested in signing him on a loan deal, however, that deal failed to materialize as the two clubs could not agree on terms. In total, he made 28 appearances for Werder II, scoring three goals and adding two assists. His contract expired after the 2021–22 season and he chose to depart the club, despite an offer to join the first team, as Werder wanted to send him out on loan.

=== 1. FC Magdeburg II ===
On June 1, 2022, Halbouni signed with newly promoted 2. Bundesliga club 1. FC Magdeburg on a three-year contract. After appearing as an unused substitute in two league matches with the first team, he then joined the second team in the sixth tier Verbandsliga Sachsen-Anhalt, making his debut on August 19 against MSC Preussen. However, his first season with the club was cut short, following an injury during national team duty, requiring a nine-month recovery period. Upon return from his injury, he was again sent to play with the second team. In January 2024, he was left out of the first team squad for the second half of the season, and went on trial with Major League Soccer club Vancouver Whitecaps FC.

=== Vancouver Whitecaps FC ===
On February 5, 2024, he signed a two-year contract with the Whitecaps through 2025, with a one-year extension option for 2026. On March 5, 2025, he scored his first goal for the club in a 1–1 draw against Mexican club Monterrey in the 2025 CONCACAF Champions Cup.

In April 2026, Halbouni underwent surgery to repair the meniscus in his left knee, sidelining him for the entire 2026 season. In November 2026, it was announced that Halbouni was diagnosed with cancer (Hodgkin lymphoma) and would be stepping away from football to recover; at the same time, the club extended his contract through the 2027-28 season.

== International career ==
Halbouni is eligible to represent Canada, Lebanon (where his mother was born), and Syria (where his father was born) internationally.

In January 2021, Halbouni received his first Canada national team call-up for a camp in Florida.

In September 2022, Halbouni accepted a call-up with Syria for two friendlies at the 2022 Jordan International Tournament. He made his debut as a substitute in a 2–0 loss against Jordan on 23 September 2022, but tore his ACL during the match.

== Personal life ==
Halbouni is a Muslim and fasts during Ramadan while playing matches.

== Career statistics ==
As of match played November 6, 2026

Appearances and goals by club, season and competition
| Club | Season | League | | | Playoffs | | National cup | | Continental | | Other | | Total | |
| Club | Season | Division | Apps | Goals | Apps | Goals | Apps | Goals | Apps | Goals | Apps | Goals | Apps | Goals |
|---|---|---|---|---|---|---|---|---|---|---|---|---|---|---|
| FC London | 2017 | League1 Ontario | 6 | 1 | — | | — | | — | | | | 6 | 1 |
| FC London | 2018 | League1 Ontario | 10 | 2 | 0 | 0 | — | | — | | | | 10 | 2 |
| FC London | 2019 | League1 Ontario | 12 | 0 | 5 | 0 | — | | — | | — | | 17 | 0 |
| FC London | Total | | 28 | 3 | 5 | 0 | 0 | 0 | 0 | 0 | 0 | 0 | 33 | 3 |
| Werder Bremen II | 2019–20 | Regionalliga Nord | 1 | 0 | — | | — | | — | | — | | 1 | 0 |
| Werder Bremen II | 2020–21 | Regionalliga Nord | 4 | 0 | — | | — | | — | | — | | 4 | 0 |
| Werder Bremen II | 2021–22 | Regionalliga Nord | 23 | 3 | — | | — | | — | | — | | 23 | 3 |
| Werder Bremen II | Total | | 28 | 3 | 0 | 0 | 0 | 0 | 0 | 0 | 0 | 0 | 28 | 3 |
| 1. FC Magdeburg II | 2022–23 | Verbandsliga Sachsen-Anhalt | 5 | 0 | — | | — | | — | | — | | 5 | 0 |
| 1. FC Magdeburg II | 2023–24 | NOFV-Oberliga Süd | 3 | 1 | — | | — | | — | | — | | 3 | 1 |
| 1. FC Magdeburg II | Total | | 8 | 1 | 0 | 0 | 0 | 0 | 0 | 0 | 0 | 0 | 8 | 1 |
| Vancouver Whitecaps FC | 2024 | Major League Soccer | 3 | 0 | 0 | 0 | 2 | 0 | 0 | 0 | 2 | 0 | 7 | 0 |
| Vancouver Whitecaps FC | 2025 | Major League Soccer | 13 | 0 | 3 | 0 | 3 | 0 | 3 | 1 | — | | 22 | 1 |
| Vancouver Whitecaps FC | 2026 | Major League Soccer | 0 | 0 | 0 | 0 | 0 | 0 | 0 | 0 | — | | 0 | 0 |
| Vancouver Whitecaps FC | Total | | 16 | 0 | 3 | 0 | 5 | 0 | 3 | 1 | 2 | 0 | 29 | 1 |
| Whitecaps FC 2 (loan) | 2024 | MLS Next Pro | 4 | 0 | 0 | 0 | — | | — | | — | | 4 | 0 |
| Whitecaps FC 2 (loan) | 2025 | MLS Next Pro | 1 | 1 | 0 | 0 | — | | — | | — | | 1 | 1 |
| Whitecaps FC 2 (loan) | Total | | 5 | 1 | 0 | 0 | 0 | 0 | 0 | 0 | 0 | 0 | 5 | 1 |
| Career total | | | 85 | 8 | 8 | 0 | 5 | 0 | 3 | 1 | 2 | 0 | 103 | 9 |
