= J.C. Ngando =

Cameroonian footballer (born 1999)

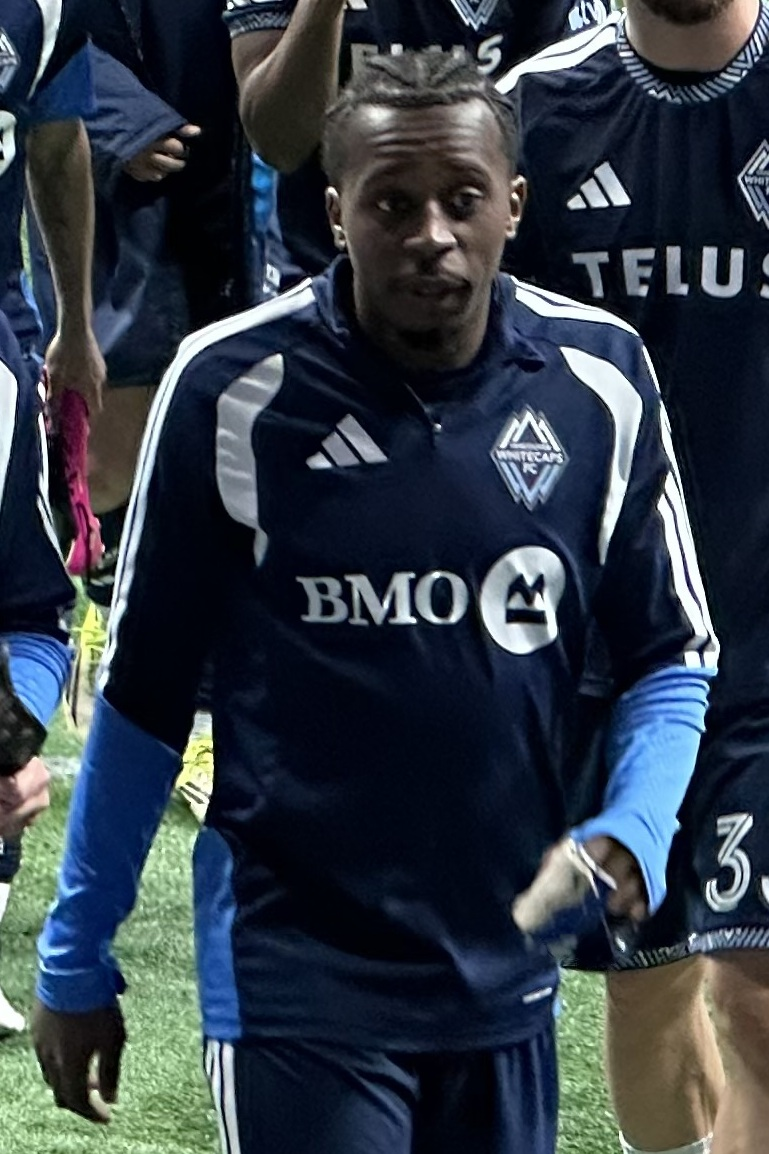
- Ngando in 2026

Personal information
- Full name: Jean-Claude Ngando Mbende
- Date of birth: 20 November 1999 (age 26)
- Place of birth: Douala, Cameroon
- Height: 1.76 m (5 ft 9 in)
- Position: Midfielder

Youth career
- Amiens

College career
| Years | Team | Apps | (Gls) |
| 2021–2022 | UNC Greensboro Spartans | 38 | (9) |

Senior career*
| Years | Team | Apps | (Gls) |
| 2017–2020 | Amiens II | 36 | (3) |
| 2020 | Paris FC II | 1 | (0) |
| 2022 | South Georgia Tormenta 2 | 11 | (5) |
| 2023–2026 | Vancouver Whitecaps FC | 36 | (2) |
| 2023 | Whitecaps FC 2 | 13 | (1) |
| 2024 | → Las Vegas Lights (loan) | 36 | (2) |
- * Club domestic league appearances and goals as of 11:20, July 22, 2026 (UTC)

Jean-Claude "J.C." Ngando Mbende (born 20 November 1999) is a Cameroonian professional footballer who plays as a midfielder.

== Early life ==
Born in Douala, Cameroon, Ngando moved to France at the age of seven where he would go on to play second team football for Paris FC and Amiens SC. With football in Europe suspended by the COVID-19 pandemic and no professional contract he evaluated his options and decided to look for a new opportunity which he later called “the best decision of my life”. He then attended University of North Carolina Greensboro after being assisted into a scholarship by the FFFUSA programme. He was named the 2021 South Conference Freshman of the Year, and in 2022 was the South Conference Player of the Year, and he was chosen for both the NCAA Division I All American First Team and All-South Region First Team. In 2021 he had scored 5 goals in 15 appearances, and in 2022 in 23 matches Ngando scored 4 goals and was credited with 14 assists.

== Career ==
At the 2023 MLS SuperDraft Vancouver traded with Houston Dynamo the No. 13 pick as well as $225,000 in General Allocation Money ($125,000 in 2023, $100,000 in 2024) in order to get the No. 5 pick with which they chose Ngando. He was given a Generation Adidas contract and had the honour of being the highest ever drafted player from the UNCG programme.

Ngando made his Vancouver debut against Real C.D. España, in a 2023 CONCACAF Champions League home round-of-16 tie which Vancouver won 5–0 on 9 March 2023. He made his MLS debut appearing as a substitute away at Minnesota United in a 1–1 draw with Vancouver on 25 March 2023.

On 6 March 2024, Ngando joined USL Championship side Las Vegas Lights on loan for their 2024 season.

After a loan spell at USL Championship side Las Vegas Lights, Ngando returned to the Vancouver Whitecaps for the MLS 2025 season. He re-signed with the Vancouver Whitecaps for the 2025 season, with club options for 2026 and 2027.

On 14 June 2025, Ngando scored his first MLS goal against Columbus Crew, a slight deflection off of a shot from Daniel Rios.

On 3 September 2026, Ngando and Vancouver mutually agreed to terminate his deal with the club.
