= Joedrick Pupe =

Belgian footballer (born 1997)

Personal information
- Date of birth: 4 June 1997 (age 29)
- Place of birth: Bruges, Belgium
- Height: 1.90 m (6 ft 3 in)
- Position: Centre-back

Team information
- Current team: Sint-Truiden
- Number: 23

Youth career
- 2003–2014: Club Brugge
- 2014–2018: Kortrijk
- 2018–2019: Almere City

Senior career*
Years	Team	Apps	(Gls)
2019–2020	Almere City U21	13	(0)
2020–2021	KSV Oostkamp		
2021–2022	Sint-Eloois-Winkel	26	(0)
2022–2023	Lierse	27	(2)
2023–2025	Dender	62	(0)
2025–2026	Vancouver Whitecaps FC	2	(0)
2026	→ Sint-Truiden (loan)	8	(1)
2026–	Sint-Truiden	0	(0)
- * Club domestic league appearances and goals as of 31 May 2026

Joedrick Pupe (born 4 June 1997) is a Belgian professional footballer who plays as a centre-back for Sint-Truiden.

== Career ==
A youth product of Club Brugge, Pupe moved to the academy of Kortrijk in 2014. On 27 June 2018, he moved to the Dutch club Almere City on a two-year contract, where he first assigned to their U21s. A knee injury prevented him from joining their senior, and he returned to semi-pro teams in Belgium with KSV Oostkamp and Sint-Eloois-Winkel from 2020 to 2022. On 7 June 2022, he returned to professional football with Lierse on a one-year contract. On 4 July 2023, he transferred to Dender for two seasons. On 4 July 2024, he extended his contract with Dender until 2027 after helping the club get promoted to the Belgian Pro League.

On 20 August 2025, Pupe signed with Major League Soccer club Vancouver Whitecaps until the end of 2027, with a club option for 2028.

On 29 January 2026, Pupe signed with Sint-Truidense V.V. on loan until June 2026.

On 23 June 2026, Sint-Truidense VV bought Joedrick Pupe after his short-term loan.

== Personal life ==
While at Sint-Eloois-Winkel in 2021, Pupe was a part-time footballer who worked at a warehouse. He runs a coffee shop in Ostend with his brother-in-law.

== Honours ==
Individual

- 2023–24 Challenger Pro League Team of the Season
