= Jeevan Badwal =

Canadian soccer player (born 2006)

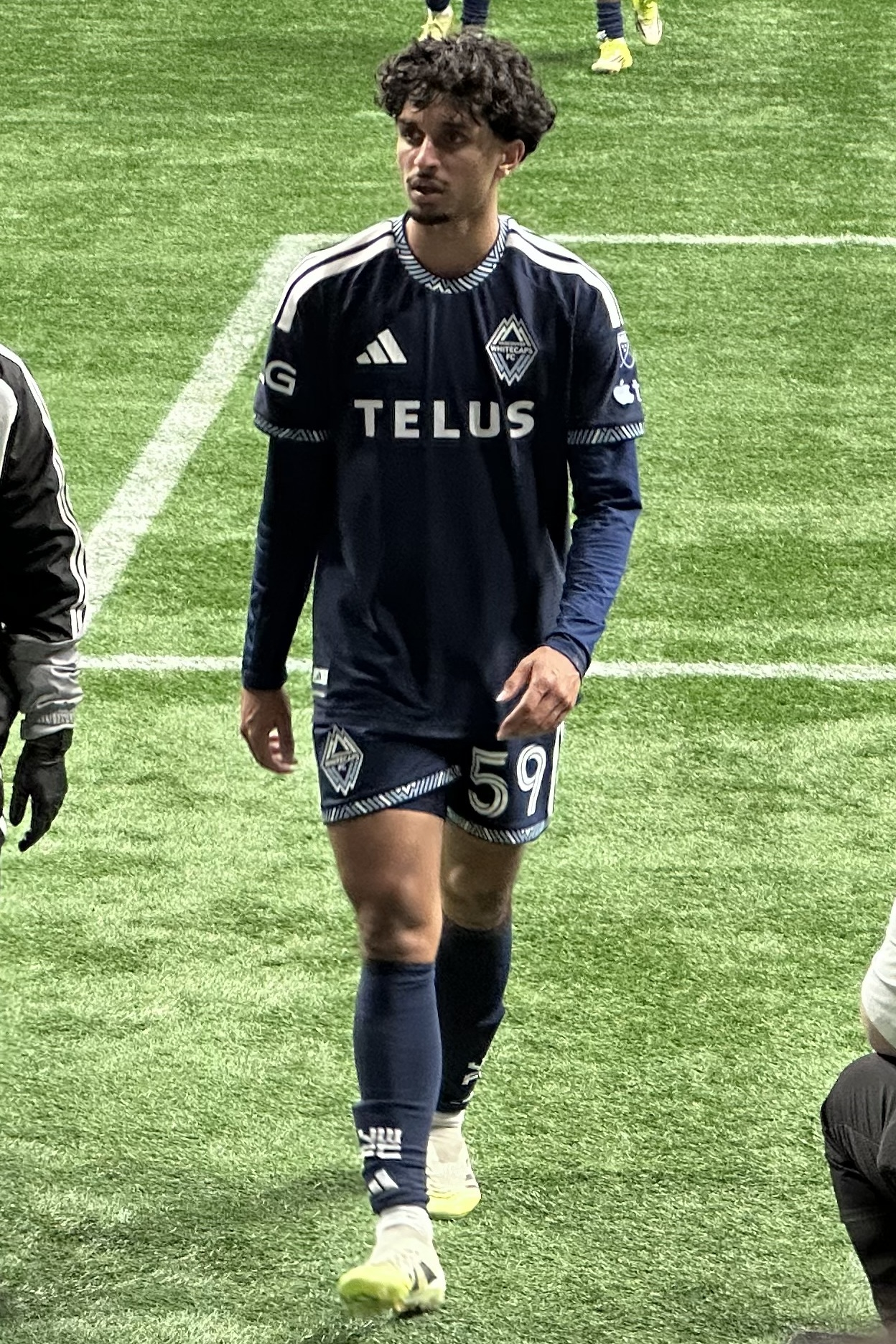
- Badwal with Vancouver Whitecaps FC in 2026

Personal information
- Full name: Jeevan Singh Badwal
- Date of birth: March 11, 2006 (age 20)
- Place of birth: Surrey, British Columbia, Canada
- Height: 1.79 m (5 ft 10 in)
- Position: Midfielder

Team information
- Current team: Vancouver Whitecaps
- Number: 59

Youth career
- Surrey FC
- Pacific United FC
- Coastal FC
- Supra Academy
- B.E.S.T Academy
- 2019–: Vancouver Whitecaps

Senior career*
Years	Team	Apps	(Gls)
2023–2024	Whitecaps FC 2	30	(2)
2024	→ Vancouver Whitecaps (loan)	0	(0)
2024–	Vancouver Whitecaps	47	(2)
2025	→ Whitecaps FC 2 (loan)	3	(0)

International career^{‡}
2023	Canada U17	9	(0)
2024–	Canada U20	6	(0)
2026	Canada B	1	(0)
- * Club domestic league appearances and goals as of October 24, 2026 ‡ National team caps and goals as of January 17, 2026

Jeevan Singh Badwal (born March 11, 2006) is a Canadian professional soccer player who plays as a midfielder for Vancouver Whitecaps FC in Major League Soccer.

== Early life ==
Badwal began playing youth soccer at age four with Surrey FC. Afterwards, he played with Pacific United FC, being invited to a Wolverhampton Wanderers' US National Academy camp in Arizona in July 2016 when he was 10. He later played with Coastal FC, Supra Academy, and B.E.S.T. Academy. In August 2019, he joined the Vancouver Whitecaps Academy. In 2022, he was named the Whitecaps U16 Player of the Year. In June 2023, he was selected to play in the MLS Next All-Star Game. Badwal is of Punjabi-Indian descent and can speak Punjabi.

== Club career ==
In 2023, he began playing with Whitecaps FC 2 in MLS Next Pro as an academy callup. In February 2024, he signed a professional contract with the team. After participating in the 2024 pre-season with the Vancouver Whitecaps first team, he signed a short-term loan agreement with them ahead of their CONCACAF Champions Cup Round One first leg against Tigres UANL, but was an unused substitute in the match. On May 19, 2024, he scored his first professional goal for Whitecaps FC 2, also adding an assist in the same match, in a 3–2 loss to Colorado Rapids 2. He signed another three short-term loans that season.

In September 2024, he signed a homegrown player contract with Vancouver Whitecaps through the 2027 season, with options for 2028 and 2029. On June 8, 2025, he scored his first goal, in a 3–0 victory over Seattle Sounders FC.

== International career ==
In October 2022, Badwal was called up to the Canadian national program for the first time for a camp with the Canada U17 team. He was later called up for the 2023 CONCACAF U-17 Championship and the 2023 FIFA U-17 World Cup.

In February 2024, Badwal was named to the Canada U20 for the 2024 CONCACAF Under-20 Championship qualifiers. In July 2024, he was named to the final squad for the tournament.

In January 2026, he was named to the Canada senior team for the first time for a training camp and friendly against Guatemala.

In September 2026, he was called up to the senior team squad for three friendlies in the September-October international window.

== Career statistics ==
As of October 24, 2026

Appearances and goals by club, season and competition
Club	Season	League			Playoffs		National cup		League cup		Continental		Total	
Club	Season	Division	Apps	Goals	Apps	Goals	Apps	Goals	Apps	Goals	Apps	Goals	Apps	Goals
Whitecaps FC 2	2023	MLS Next Pro	8	0	–		–		–		–		8	0
Whitecaps FC 2	2024	MLS Next Pro	22	2	–		–		–		–		22	2
Whitecaps FC 2	Total		30	2	0	0	0	0	0	0	0	0	30	2
Vancouver Whitecaps (loan)	2024	Major League Soccer	0	0	0	0	1	0	0	0	0	0	1	0
Vancouver Whitecaps	2025	Major League Soccer	25	1	2	0	4	0	0	0	2	0	33	1
Vancouver Whitecaps	2026	Major League Soccer	22	1	0	0	4	0	2	1	4	1	32	3
Vancouver Whitecaps	Total		47	2	2	0	9	0	2	1	6	1	66	4
Whitecaps FC 2 (loan)	2025	MLS Next Pro	3	0	0	0	–		–		–		3	0
Career total			80	4	2	0	9	0	2	1	6	1	99	5
