= Andrés Cubas =

Paraguayan footballer (born 1996)

- Cubas with Paraguay in 2026

Personal information
- Full name: Adrián Andrés Cubas
- Date of birth: 11 May 1996 (age 30)
- Place of birth: Aristóbulo del Valle, Argentina
- Height: 1.69 m (5 ft 7 in)
- Position: Midfielder

Team information
- Current team: Vancouver Whitecaps
- Number: 20

Youth career
- Boca Juniors

Senior career*
Years	Team	Apps	(Gls)
2014–2018	Boca Juniors	28	(0)
2017	→ Pescara (loan)	1	(0)
2017–2018	→ Defensa y Justicia (loan)	21	(0)
2018–2020	Talleres	38	(1)
2020–2022	Nîmes	48	(2)
2022–	Vancouver Whitecaps	120	(1)

International career^{‡}
2015	Argentina U20	3	(0)
2019–	Paraguay	40	(0)
- * Club domestic league appearances and goals as of 13 September 2026 ‡ National team caps and goals as of 2 October 2026

Adrián Andrés Cubas (born 11 May 1996) is a professional footballer who plays as midfielder for Major League Soccer club Vancouver Whitecaps. Born in Argentina, he plays for the Paraguay national team.

== Club career ==
Cubas joined French club Nîmes from Argentine side Talleres in 2020. The transfer fee paid to Talleres was reported as around €3 million.

On 28 April 2022, he signed a contract with Major League Soccer side Vancouver Whitecaps FC until June 2026. He was purchased for a reported fee of $3 million from Nîmes.

Cubas made his Vancouver debut on 14 June 2022 against Seattle Sounders FC. He scored his first goal for the club on 2 July 2022 against Los Angeles FC.

On 24 February 2026, he signed a contract extension with the Whitecaps through the 2027–28 season.

== International career ==
Cubas represented the Argentina under-20 team at the 2015 FIFA U-20 World Cup.

On 1 June 2026, Cubas was announced as part of the Paraguay squad for the 2026 FIFA World Cup.

== Personal life ==
Cubas's father is from Paraguay.

== Career statistics ==
=== Club ===
As of match played 13 September 2026

Appearances and goals by club, season and competition
Club	Season	League			National cup		League cup		Continental		Other		Total	
Club	Season	Division	Apps	Goals	Apps	Goals	Apps	Goals	Apps	Goals	Apps	Goals	Apps	Goals
Boca Juniors	2013–14	Argentine Primera División	3	0	0	0	0	0	0	0	0	0	3	0
Boca Juniors	2014	Argentine Primera División	7	0	0	0	0	0	2 (Note: Appearances in the Copa Sudamericana)	0	0	0	9	0
Boca Juniors	2015	Argentine Primera División	9	0	3	1	0	0	2 (Note: Appearances in the Copa Libertadores)	0	0	0	14	1
Boca Juniors	2016	Argentine Primera División	6	0	2	0	0	0	6	0	1 (Note: Appearance in the Supercopa Argentina)	0	15	0
Boca Juniors	2016–17	Argentine Primera División	3	0	0	0	0	0	0	0	0	0	3	0
Boca Juniors	Total		28	0	5	1	0	0	10	0	1	0	44	1
Pescara (loan)	2016–17	Serie A	1	0	0	0	–		–		–		1	0
Defensa y Justicia (loan)	2017–18	Argentine Primera División	21	0	3	0	0	0	2	0	0	0	26	0
Talleres	2018–19	Argentine Primera División	18	1	3	0	3	0	4	0	0	0	28	1
Talleres	2019–20	Argentine Primera División	20	0	3	0	1	0	0	0	1	0	25	0
Talleres	Total		38	1	6	0	4	0	4	0	1	0	53	1
Nîmes Olympique	2020–21	Ligue 1	27	1	0	0	—		—		—		27	1
Nîmes Olympique	2021–22	Ligue 2	21	1	2	0	—		—		—		23	1
Nîmes Olympique	Total		48	2	2	0	—		—		—		50	2
Vancouver Whitecaps FC	2022	MLS	18	1	0	0	—		—		2 (Note: Appearances in Canadian Championship)	0	20	1
Vancouver Whitecaps FC	2023	MLS	28	0	0	0	—		2 (Note: Appearances in CONCACAF Champions Cup)	0	5 (Note: Three appearances in Leagues Cup, two appearances in Canadian Championship)	0	35	0
Vancouver Whitecaps FC	2024	MLS	28	0	4	0	—		1	0	3 (Note: Appearances in MLS Cup Playoffs and Canadian Championship)	0	36	0
Vancouver Whitecaps FC	2025	MLS	25	0	0	0	—		8	0	2	0	35	0
Vancouver Whitecaps FC	2026	MLS	21	0	0	0	—		3	0	3 (Note: One appearance in Leagues Cup, two appearances in Canadian Championship)	0	26	0
Vancouver Whitecaps FC	Total		120	1	4	0	—		14	0	15	0	153	1
Career total			256	4	20	1	4	0	30	0	14	0	324	4

=== International ===
As of match played 2 October 2026

Appearances and goals by national team and year
National team	Year	Apps	Goals
Paraguay	2019	1	0
Paraguay	2020	2	0
Paraguay	2021	4	0
Paraguay	2022	6	0
Paraguay	2023	5	0
Paraguay	2024	7	0
Paraguay	2025	7	0
Paraguay	2026	8	0
Total		40	0

== Honours ==
Boca Juniors

- Argentine Primera División: 2015
- Copa Argentina: 2014–15

Vancouver Whitecaps

- Canadian Championship: 2022, 2023, 2024

Individual

- MLS All-Star: 2026
