= Mathías Laborda =

Uruguayan footballer (born 1999)

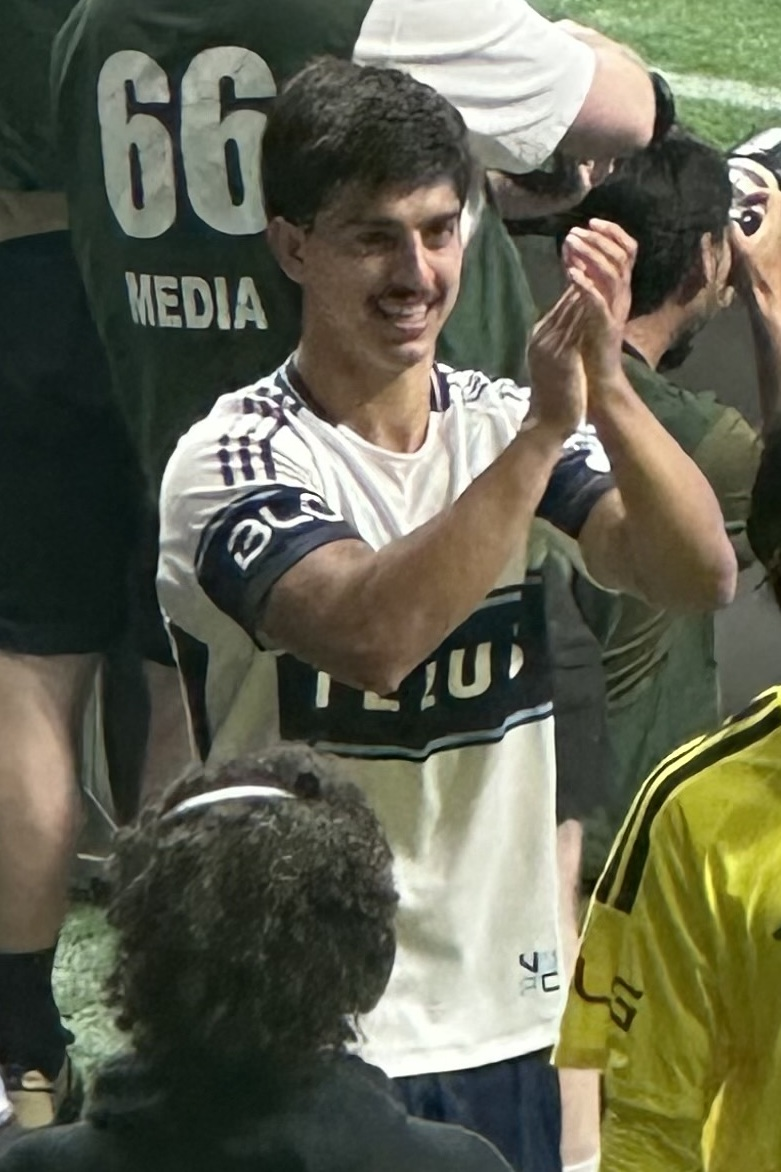
- Laborda in 2026

Personal information
- Full name: Mathías Nicolás Laborda Malseñido
- Date of birth: 15 September 1999 (age 27)
- Place of birth: Fray Bentos, Uruguay
- Height: 1.82 m (6 ft 0 in)
- Positions: Right-back; centre-back

Team information
- Current team: Vancouver Whitecaps FC
- Number: 2

Youth career
- Nacional

Senior career*
Years	Team	Apps	(Gls)
2019–2023	Nacional	83	(6)
2023–	Vancouver Whitecaps FC	87	(12)

International career
2017	Uruguay U18	3	(0)
2018–2019	Uruguay U20	10	(0)
2020	Uruguay U23	6	(0)
- * Club domestic league appearances and goals as of 2 May 2026

Mathías Nicolás Laborda Malseñido (born 15 September 1999) is a Uruguayan professional footballer who plays as a right-back or centre-back for Major League Soccer club Vancouver Whitecaps FC.

== Club career ==
Before making his professional debut. Laborda has been scouted several times by the Spanish football club Barcelona.

Laborda made his professional debut on 8 May 2019, in a 1–1 draw against Cerro Porteño. He came in as a substitute in the 55th minute of the match.

He made his league debut on 28 July 2019, in a 4–2 win against Club Atlético Progreso. He played all 90 minutes and scored one of the goals.

On 9 January 2023, it was announced that Laborda would join Major League Soccer side Vancouver Whitecaps on a three-year deal.

== International career ==
As a youth international, Laborda has represented Uruguay at the 2019 South American U-20 Championship and the 2020 CONMEBOL Pre-Olympic Tournament.

== Honours ==
Nacional U20

- U-20 Copa Libertadores: 2018

Nacional

- Uruguayan Primera División: 2020, 2022
- Supercopa Uruguaya: 2021

Vancouver Whitecaps FC

- Canadian Championship: 2023, 2024, 2025
