= 2021 Vancouver Whitecaps FC season =

Vancouver Whitecaps FC 2021 soccer season

Vancouver Whitecaps FC
- Chairman: Jeff Mallett
- Head coach: Marc Dos Santos (until August 27); Vanni Sartini (acting)
- Stadium: BC Place (Vancouver, BC) (from August 21); Rio Tinto Stadium (Sandy, Utah) (until July 31)
- Major League Soccer: Conference: 6th Overall: 12th
- MLS Cup Playoffs: First Round
- Canadian Championship: Preliminary round
- Top goalscorer: League: Brian White (12); All: Brian White; Cristian Dájome (12)
- Highest home attendance: League/All: 25,117; November 7 vs. Seattle Sounders FC
- Lowest home attendance: League/All: 7,503; August 29 vs. Real Salt Lake
- Biggest win: 4–1 (vs Real Salt Lake, August 29)
- Biggest defeat: 0–4 (vs Real Salt Lake, July 7)
Home colours	Away colours

The 2021 Vancouver Whitecaps FC season was the club's eleventh season in Major League Soccer, the top division of soccer in the United States and Canada. Including previous iterations of the franchise, this was the 44th season of professional soccer being played in Vancouver.

Due to COVID-19 cross-border restrictions imposed by the Canadian government, Vancouver Whitecaps FC along with two other Canadian MLS teams began playing home matches in the United States at the start of the season while also sharing stadiums with other American MLS teams. The team temporarily played home matches at Real Salt Lake's Rio Tinto Stadium at Sandy, Utah, at the start of the season. On July 23, MLS announced that the Whitecaps will play home matches in Vancouver in August.

On August 27, the Whitecaps parted ways with head coach Marc Dos Santos and assistant coach Phillip Dos Santos. Vanni Sartini was named as acting head coach.

== Roster ==
As of September 9, 2021

No.	Player	Nationality	Position	Date of birth (age)	Previous club
Goalkeepers
1	Thomas Hasal	(Canada)	GK	July 2, 1999 (age 27)	(Canada) Vancouver Whitecaps FC U-23
12	Evan Newton	(United States)	GK	April 1, 1988 (age 38)	(United States) Indy Eleven
16	Maxime Crepeau	(Canada)	GK	April 11, 1994 (age 32)	(Canada) Montreal Impact
Defenders
2	Marcus Godinho	(Canada)	DF	June 28, 1997 (age 29)	(Germany) FSV Zwickau
3	Cristián Gutiérrez	(Chile) (Canada)	DF	February 18, 1997 (age 29)	(Chile) Colo-Colo
4	Ranko Veselinović	(Serbia)	DF	March 24, 1999 (age 27)	(Serbia) Vojvodina
6	Bruno Gaspar	(Angola) (Portugal)	DF	April 21, 1993 (age 33)	(Portugal) Sporting CP
22	Érik Godoy	(Argentina)	DF	August 16, 1993 (age 33)	(Argentina) Colón
23	Javain Brown	(Jamaica)	DF	March 19, 1999 (age 27)	(United States) South Florida Bulls
26	Florian Jungwirth	(West Germany)	DF	January 27, 1989 (age 37)	(United States) San Jose Earthquakes
28	Jake Nerwinski	(United States)	DF	October 17, 1994 (age 32)	(United States) Connecticut Huskies
Midfielders
8	Caio Alexandre	(Brazil)	MF	February 24, 1999 (age 27)	(Brazil) Botafogo
15	Andy Rose	(United Kingdom)	MF	February 13, 1990 (age 36)	(Scotland) Motherwell
17	Leonard Owusu	(Ghana)	MF	June 3, 1997 (age 29)	(Israel) Ashdod
19	Janio Bikel	(Guinea-Bissau) (Portugal)	MF	June 28, 1995 (age 31)	(Bulgaria) CSKA Sofia
25	Ryan Gauld	(Scotland)	MF	December 16, 1995 (age 30)	(Portugal) Farense
27	Ryan Raposo	(Canada)	MF	March 5, 1999 (age 27)	(United States) Syracuse Orange
30	Kamron Habibullah	(Canada)	MF	October 3, 2003 (age 23)	(Canada) Vancouver Whitecaps FC U-23
31	Russell Teibert	(Canada)	MF	December 22, 1992 (age 33)	(Canada) Vancouver Whitecaps (USSF-D2)
32	Patrick Metcalfe	(Canada)	MF	November 11, 1998 (age 28)	(Canada) Vancouver Whitecaps Development Squad
45	Pedro Vite	(Ecuador)	MF	March 9, 2002 (age 24)	(Ecuador) Independiente del Valle
55	Michael Baldisimo	(Canada)	MF	April 13, 2000 (age 26)	(Canada) Vancouver Whitecaps FC Residency
Forwards
7	Déiber Caicedo	(Colombia)	FW	March 25, 2000 (age 26)	(Colombia) Deportivo Cali
9	Lucas Cavallini	(Canada)	FW	December 28, 1992 (age 33)	(Mexico) Club Puebla
11	Cristian Dájome	(Colombia)	FW	January 3, 1994 (age 32)	(Colombia) Atlético Nacional
24	Brian White	(United States)	FW	February 3, 1996 (age 30)	(United States) New York Red Bulls
87	Tosaint Ricketts	(Canada)	FW	August 6, 1987 (age 39)	(Lithuania) Sūduva
Out on Loan
13	Derek Cornelius	(Canada)	DF	November 25, 1997 (age 28)	(Serbia) Javor Ivanjica
14	Theo Bair	(Canada)	FW	August 27, 1999 (age 27)	(Canada) Vancouver Whitecaps FC Residency
18	David Egbo	(Nigeria)	FW	October 31, 1998 (age 28)	(United States) Akron Zips
20	Jasser Khmiri	(Tunisia)	DF	July 27, 1997 (age 29)	(Tunisia) Stade Tunisien
34	Gianfranco Facchineri	(Canada)	DF	April 27, 2002 (age 24)	(Canada) Vancouver Whitecaps Development Squad
54	Simon Colyn	(Canada)	MF	March 23, 2002 (age 24)	(Canada) Vancouver Whitecaps FC Residency
60	Isaac Boehmer	(Canada)	GK	November 20, 2001 (age 25)	(Canada) Vancouver Whitecaps Development Squad
61	Matteo Campagna	(Canada)	MF	June 27, 2004 (age 22)	(Canada) Vancouver Whitecaps FC U-23
62	Damiano Pecile	(Canada)	MF	April 11, 2002 (age 24)	(Canada) Vancouver Whitecaps Development Squad

== Transfers ==
=== In ===
==== Transferred in ====
#	Position	Player	Transferred from	Fee/notes	Date	Source
7	FW	(Colombia) Déiber Caicedo	(Colombia) Deportivo Cali	Undisclosed	January 26, 2021	
12	GK	(United States) Evan Newton	(United States) Indy Eleven	Undisclosed	January 29, 2021	
18	FW	(Nigeria) David Egbo	(United States) Akron Zips	2021 MLS SuperDraft	February 1, 2021	
23	DF	(Jamaica) Javain Brown	(United States) South Florida Bulls	2021 MLS SuperDraft	February 17, 2021	
8	MF	(Brazil) Caio Alexandre	(Brazil) Botafogo	Undisclosed	March 12, 2021	
30	MF	(Canada) Kamron Habibullah	(Canada) Vancouver Whitecaps FC U-23	Homegrown player	April 23, 2021	
61	MF	(Canada) Matteo Campagna	(Canada) Vancouver Whitecaps FC U-23	Homegrown player	April 23, 2021	
24	FW	(United States) Brian White	(United States) New York Red Bulls	$400,000 GAM + add ons	June 2, 2021	
25	MF	(Scotland) Ryan Gauld	(Portugal) Farense	Undisclosed/Designated Player	July 31, 2021	
45	MF	(Ecuador) Pedro Vite	(Ecuador) Independiente del Valle	Undisclosed	August 5, 2021	
26	DF	(West Germany) Florian Jungwirth	(United States) San Jose Earthquakes	$200,000 GAM + conditional $100,000 GAM	August 6, 2021	
2	DF	(Canada) Marcus Godinho	(Germany) FSV Zwickau	Free	August 20, 2021	

==== Loans in ====
#	Position	Player	Loaned from	Date	Loan expires	Source
6	DF	(Angola) Bruno Gaspar	(Portugal) Sporting CP	March 9, 2021	December 31, 2021	

=== Out ===
==== Transferred out ====
#	Position	Player	Transferred to	Fee/notes	Date	Source
1	GK	(United States) Bryan Meredith		Out of contract	November 30, 2020	
12	FW	(Colombia) Fredy Montero		Out of contract	November 30, 2020	
56	DF	(Canada) Georges Mukumbilwa		Option declined	November 30, 2020	
30	GK	(United States) Evan Bush	(United States) Columbus Crew SC	Traded in exchange for $125,000 in GAM	December 13, 2020	
7	FW	(France) David Milinković		Mutual contract termination	February 1, 2021	
53	DF	(Iraq) Ali Adnan		Mutual contract termination	July 3, 2021	

==== Loans out ====
#	Position	Player	Loaned to	Date	Loan expires	Source
54	MF	(Canada) Simon Colyn	(Italy) SPAL	October 7, 2020	August 26, 2021	
20	DF	(Tunisia) Jasser Khmiri	(United States) San Antonio FC	March 26, 2021	November 30, 2021	
62	MF	(Canada) Damiano Pecile	(Italy) Venezia	June 1, 2021	June 30, 2022	
18	FW	(Nigeria) David Egbo	(United States) Phoenix Rising FC	June 3, 2021	November 30, 2021	
13	DF	(Canada) Derek Cornelius	(Greece) Panetolikos	July 12, 2021	December 31, 2022	
14	FW	(Canada) Theo Bair	(Norway) Hamarkameratene	August 6, 2021	December 31, 2021	
34	DF	(Canada) Gianfranco Facchineri	(United States) San Diego Loyal	August 7, 2021	November 30, 2021	
61	MF	(Canada) Matteo Campagna	(Canada) York United	August 24, 2021	November 30, 2021	
54	MF	(Canada) Simon Colyn	(Netherlands) Jong PSV	August 27, 2021	June 30, 2022	
60	GK	(Canada) Isaac Boehmer	(Canada) Pacific FC	September 9, 2021	November 30, 2021	

== Major League Soccer ==
=== Preseason ===
April 6, 2020	Whitecaps FC	3–0	Real Monarchs	Herriman, Utah
12:00 (PDT)	Cavallini 3'; Dájome 57' (pen.); Godoy 71'	Report		Stadium: Zions Bank Stadium

April 10, 2020	Whitecaps FC	3–2	Chicago Fire FC	Bridgeview, Illinois
09:30 (PDT)	Dájome 5'; Cavallini 30' (Owusu), 60'	VAN Report; CHI Report	Berić 9' (pen.); Calvo	Stadium: SeatGeek Stadium

April 10, 2020	Indy Eleven	2–0	Whitecaps FC	Bridgeview, Illinois
12:00 (PDT)	Hamilton 4', 40'	Report		Stadium: SeatGeek Stadium

=== Regular season ===
==== League tables ====
===== Western Conference =====
Pos	Team	Pld	W	L	T	GF	GA	GD	Pts	
4	Portland Timbers	34	17	13	4	56	52	+4	55	Qualification for the first round
5	Minnesota United FC	34	13	11	10	42	44	−2	49	Qualification for the first round
6	Vancouver Whitecaps FC (Note: Canadian clubs could not qualify for the 2022 CONCACAF Champions League through the MLS regular season or playoffs.)	34	12	9	13	45	45	0	49	Qualification for the first round
7	Real Salt Lake	34	14	14	6	55	54	+1	48	Qualification for the first round
8	LA Galaxy	34	13	12	9	50	54	−4	48	

Source: MLS
Rules for classification: 1) points; 2) total wins; 3) total goal differential; 4) total goals scored; 5) fewer disciplinary points; 6) away goal differential; 7) away goals scored; 8) home goals differential; 9) home goals scored; 10) coin toss (2 clubs tied) or drawing of lots (≥3 clubs tied)

===== Overall =====
Pos	Team	Pld	W	L	T	GF	GA	GD	Pts
10	Orlando City SC	34	13	9	12	50	48	+2	51
11	Minnesota United FC	34	13	11	10	42	44	−2	49
12	Vancouver Whitecaps FC	34	12	9	13	45	45	0	49
13	Real Salt Lake	34	14	14	6	55	54	+1	48
14	New York Red Bulls	34	13	12	9	39	33	+6	48

Source: MLS
Rules for classification: 1) points; 2) total wins; 3) total goal differential; 4) total goals scored; 5) fewer disciplinary points; 6) away goal differential; 7) away goals scored; 8) home goals differential; 9) home goals scored; 10) coin toss (2 clubs tied) or drawing of lots (≥3 clubs tied)

==== Results ====
Overall								Home						Away					
Pld	Pts	W	L	D	GF	GA	GD	W	L	D	GF	GA	GD	W	L	D	GF	GA	GD
34	49	12	9	13	45	45	0	10	4	3	25	17	+8	2	5	10	20	28	−8

Last updated: November 7, 2021
Pld = Matches played; Pts = Points; W = Matches won; T = Matches tied; L = Matches lost; GF = Goals for; GA = Goals against; GD = Goal difference

Round	1	2	3	4	5	6	7	8	9	10	11	12	13	14	15	16	17	18	19	20	21	22	23	24	25	26	27	28	29	30	31	32	33	34
Ground	H	A	H	H	A	A	A	A	H	A	A	H	H	H	A	H	A	A	A	H	H	H	H	A	H	A	H	A	H	A	A	H	A	H
Result	W	D	L	W	L	L	L	L	L	D	D	L	W	D	D	D	D	D	W	W	W	W	L	D	W	D	W	L	W	W	D	W	D	D

Updated to match(es) played on November 7, 2021. Source:
A = Away; H = Home; N = Neutral; W = Win; D = Draw; L = Loss

==== Matches ====
April 18 1	Whitecaps FC	1–0	Portland Timbers	Sandy, Utah
7:00 PM (PDT)	Veselinović (yellow card) 21'; Cavallini 49'; Baldisimo (yellow card) 64'	Report	Župarić (yellow card) 68'	Stadium: Rio Tinto Stadium; Attendance: 0 Referee: Allen Chapman

April 24 2	Toronto FC	2–2	Whitecaps FC	Orlando, Florida
12:00 PM (PDT)	Singh 7'; Bradley (yellow card) 64'; Gonzalez (yellow card) 70'; Osorio 83'	Report	Gutiérrez (yellow card) 6'; Dájome 55' (pen.); Rose 70'	Stadium: Exploria Stadium; Attendance: 0 Referee: Jair Marrufo

May 2 3	Whitecaps FC	0–1	Colorado Rapids	Sandy, Utah
7:00 PM (PDT)	Cavallini (yellow card) 27'	Report	Namli (yellow card) 17'; Rubio 26'; Rosenberry (yellow card) 37'	Stadium: Rio Tinto Stadium; Referee: Baldomero Toledo

May 8 4	Whitecaps FC	2–0	CF Montréal	Sandy, Utah
12:00 PM (PDT)	Caicedo (yellow card) 32'; Veselinović (yellow card) 38'; Cavallini (yellow card) 45'; Dájome 57' (pen.), 71'; Owusu (yellow card) 82'	Report	Mihailovic (yellow card) 24'	Stadium: Rio Tinto Stadium; Referee: Rosendo Mendoza

May 12 5	Minnesota United FC	1–0	Whitecaps FC	Saint Paul, Minnesota
6:00 PM (PDT)	Boxall (yellow card) 29'; Ábila 72' (yellow card) 74'; Alonso (yellow card) 90+4'	Report	Gaspar (yellow card) 31'; Alexandre (yellow card) 58'; Cornelius (yellow card) 76'	Stadium: Allianz Field; Attendance: 4,100; Referee: Jon Freemon

May 16 6	Sporting Kansas City	3–0	Whitecaps FC	Kansas City, Kansas
11:00 AM (PDT)	Ilie (yellow card) 9'; Sallói 28'; Pulido 32' (pen.), 58'; Kinda (yellow card) 36'; Espinoza (yellow card) 72'		Cornelius (yellow card) 53'	Stadium: Children's Mercy Park; Referee: Alan Kelly

May 22 7	Houston Dynamo FC	2–1	Whitecaps FC	Houston, Texas
6:00 PM (PDT)	Rodríguez 8'; Jones (yellow card) 22'; Corona (yellow card) 32'; Urruti 42'; García (yellow card) 82'; Picault (yellow card) 88'	Report	Cavallini (yellow card) 21'; Bikel (yellow card) 52'; Caicedo 80'; Baldisimo (yellow card) 81'	Stadium: BBVA Stadium; Attendance: 9,255; Referee: David Gantar

June 18 8	Real Salt Lake	3–1	Whitecaps FC	Sandy, Utah
7:00 PM (PDT)	Silva (yellow card) 12'; Kreilach 43', 90+5'; Meram (yellow card) 85'; Herrera (yellow card) 89'; Holt 90+2' (yellow card) 90+7'	Report	Brown (yellow card) 3'; White 54'	Stadium: Rio Tinto Stadium; Attendance: 15,109; Referee: Rubiel Vazquez

June 23 9	Whitecaps FC	1–2	LA Galaxy	Sandy, Utah
7:30 PM (PDT)	Godoy (yellow card) 23'; Bikel 90+2'	Report	Hernández 47'; DePuy (yellow card) 78'; Álvarez 90+3'	Stadium: Rio Tinto Stadium; Referee: Tori Penso

June 26 10	Seattle Sounders FC	2–2	Whitecaps FC	Seattle, Washington
6:00 PM (PDT)	Ruidíaz 40'; Medranda 71'	Report	Cavallini (yellow card) 22' (goal) 56'; Alexandre (yellow card) 45+4'; Dájome 49'; Crépeau (yellow card) 89'	Stadium: Lumen Field; Attendance: 25,603; Referee: Guido Gonzales Jr.

July 4 11	FC Dallas	2–2	Whitecaps FC	Frisco, Texas
5:30 PM (PDT)	Obrian (yellow card) 18'; Pepi 22'; Acosta (yellow card) 67'; Veselinović 90+4' (o.g.)	Report	Cavallini 30' (yellow card) 40+3'; Rose 45+3'; Alexandre (yellow card) 72'; Metcalfe (yellow card) 90+1'; Nerwinski (yellow card) 90+5'	Stadium: Toyota Stadium; Attendance: 19,096; Referee: Ramy Touchan

July 7 12	Whitecaps FC	0–4	Real Salt Lake	Sandy, Utah
7:00 PM (PDT)		Report	Kreilach 1', 57'; Ruíz (yellow card) 24'; Rusnák 74'; Toia (yellow card) 81'; Julio 90+4'	Stadium: Rio Tinto Stadium; Attendance: 12,009; Referee: Alex Chilowicz

July 17 13	Whitecaps FC	2–1	LA Galaxy	Sandy, Utah
7:00 PM (PDT)	Caicedo 48'; Baldisimo (yellow card) 69'; Dájome 77'	Report	Raveloson 5'; Williams (yellow card) 62'	Stadium: Rio Tinto Stadium; Referee: Ismir Pekmic

July 20 14	Whitecaps FC	0–0	Houston Dynamo FC	Sandy, Utah
7:00 PM (PDT)	Rose (yellow card) 24'; Alexandre (yellow card) 83'	Report	Hadebe (yellow card) 42'; Junqua (yellow card) 56'; Picault (yellow card) 83'	Stadium: Rio Tinto Stadium; Referee: Guido Gonzales Jr.

July 24 15	Los Angeles FC	2–2	Whitecaps FC	Los Angeles, California
7:30 PM PDT	Vela 42'; Baird (yellow card) 67'; Cifuentes 75'; Murillo (yellow card) 82'	Report	Caicedo 25', (yellow card) 84'; Alexandre (yellow card) 27'; Dájome 38'; Baldisimo (yellow card) 58'; Bikel (yellow card) 69'	Stadium: Banc of California Stadium; Attendance: 22,049; Referee: Kevin Stott

July 31 16	Whitecaps FC	2–2	Minnesota United FC	Sandy, Utah
7:00 PM PDT	Baldisimo (yellow card) 34'; Dájome 36', 90+4' (pen.); Ricketts (yellow card) 86'; Bikel (yellow card) 87'	Report	Finlay 45'; Métanire (yellow card) 45+2'; Taylor (yellow card) 48'; Trapp (yellow card) 55'; Lod 75'	Stadium: Rio Tinto Stadium; Referee: Lukasz Szpala

August 8 17	LA Galaxy	1–1	Whitecaps FC	Carson, California
5:00 PM PDT	Araujo (yellow card) 5'; Cabral 32'	Report	Veselinović 50' (yellow card) 81'	Stadium: StubHub Center; Attendance: 16,234; Referee: Baldomero Toledo

August 13 18	San Jose Earthquakes	0–0	Whitecaps FC	San Jose, California
7:30 PM PDT	J. López (yellow card) 43'; M. López (yellow card) 72'; Cowell (yellow card) 90+6'	Report	Dájome (yellow card) 88'	Stadium: PayPal Park; Attendance: 11,967; Referee: Timothy Ford

August 18 19	Austin FC	1–2	Whitecaps FC	Austin, Texas
6:00 PM PDT	Ring 37'; Jiménez (yellow card) 55'; Besler (yellow card) 63'	Report	Nerwinski 52'; Dájome (yellow card) 62'; White 74'	Stadium: Q2 Stadium; Attendance: 20,738; Referee: Rosendo Mendoza

August 21 20	Whitecaps FC	2–1	Los Angeles FC	Vancouver, BC
7:00 PM PDT	White 60'; Gauld 89'	Report	Rossi 45+2' (pen.); Arango (yellow card) 90+4'	Stadium: BC Place; Attendance: 11,144; Referee: Alex Chilowicz
Note: Last MLS match with Marc Dos Santos as manager. Dos Santos was fired on August 27th.

August 29 21	Whitecaps FC	4–1	Real Salt Lake	Vancouver, BC
7:00 PM PDT	Silva 33' (o.g.); Brown (yellow card) 40'; White 53'; Gauld 64'; Jungwirth 69'	Report	Powder (yellow card) 34'; Rusnák (yellow card) 53'; Silva (yellow card) 55'; Julio 90'	Stadium: BC Place; Attendance: 7,503; Referee: Ramy Touchan
Note: First match with Vanni Sartini as manager.

September 4 22	Whitecaps FC	2–1	Austin FC	Vancouver, BC
4:00 PM PDT	Godoy 70'; Caicedo 83', (yellow card) 84'	Report	Fagúndez (yellow card) 7'; Driussi 45'; Kleemann (yellow card) 79'	Stadium: BC Place; Attendance: 9,223; Referee: Pierre-Luc Lauziere

September 10 23 Cascadia Cup	Whitecaps FC	0–1	Portland Timbers	Vancouver, BC
7:00 PM PDT	Bikel (yellow card) 29'; Dájome (yellow card) 58'	Report	Veselinović 66' (o.g.); Mora (yellow card) 90+3'	Stadium: BC Place; Attendance: 8,574; Referee: Marcos de Oliveira

September 19 24	Colorado Rapids	1–1	Whitecaps FC	Commerce City, Colorado
6:00 PM PDT	Galván (yellow card) 17'; Wilson 28'	Report	White 41'	Stadium: Dick's Sporting Goods Park; Attendance: 8,454; Referee: Rubiel Vazquez

September 25 25	Whitecaps FC	1–0	FC Dallas	Vancouver, BC
7:00 PM PDT	White 20'; Gaspar (yellow card) 52'; Cavallini (yellow card) 58'	Report	Twumasi (yellow card) 82'; Acosta (yellow card) 90+1'	Stadium: BC Place; Attendance: 16,927; Referee: Kevin Stott

September 29 26	Houston Dynamo	0–0	Whitecaps FC	Houston, Texas
6:00 PM PDT		Report	Baldisimo (yellow card) 47'; Dájome (yellow card) 55'	Stadium: BBVA Stadium; Attendance: 12,114; Referee: Alan Kelly

October 2 27	Whitecaps FC	3–0	San Jose Earthquakes	Vancouver, BC
7:00 PM PDT	Owusu (yellow card) 19'; White 26', 59', 73'; Jungwirth (yellow card) 57'; Brown (yellow card) 90+5'	Report	Remedi (yellow card) 57'; Salinas (yellow card) 90+2'	Stadium: BC Place; Attendance: 12,069; Referee: Pierre-Luc Lauziere

October 9 28 Cascadia Cup	Seattle Sounders FC	4–1	Whitecaps FC	Seattle, Washington
7:00 PM PDT	O'Neill 5'; Benezet 15' (yellow card) 43'; Andrade (yellow card) 42'; Bruin 55'; Chú 90'	Report	Gaspar (yellow card) 35'; White 45+1'; Gauld (yellow card) 72'	Stadium: Lumen Field; Attendance: 31,842; Referee: Ted Unkel

October 17 29	Whitecaps FC	2–1	Sporting Kansas City	Vancouver, BC
7:00 PM PDT	Gauld 23'; Teibert 36'; White (yellow card) 51'; Nerwinski (yellow card) 85'	Report	Russell 43'; Sánchez (yellow card) 45+1'; Walter (yellow card) 70'; Kinda (yellow card) 70'	Stadium: BC Place; Attendance: 10,990; Referee: Silviu Petrescu

October 20 30 Cascadia Cup	Portland Timbers	2–3	Whitecaps FC	Portland, Oregon
7:00 PM PDT	Chará 15'; Asprilla 42'; Paredes (yellow card) 90+2'	Report	Caicedo 63'; White 75' (yellow card) 90+2'; Dájome 82' (pen.)	Stadium: Jeld-Wen Field; Attendance: 16,722; Referee: Guido Gonzales Jr.

October 23 31	San Jose Earthquakes	1–1	Whitecaps FC	San Jose, California
7:00 PM PDT	Thompson (yellow card) 45+1'; Kikanovic 60'	Report	Gaspar 53'	Stadium: PayPal Park; Attendance: 15,025; Referee: Marcos de Oliveira

October 27 32	Whitecaps FC	2–1	Minnesota United FC	Vancouver, BC
7:00 PM PDT	Jungwirth (yellow card) 38'; Boxall 45' (o.g.); White 63'; Brown (yellow card) 82'	Report	Dotson (yellow card) 84'; Reynoso (yellow card) 90'; Adi 90+1'	Stadium: BC Place; Attendance: 10,883; Referee: Nima Saghafi

November 2 33	Los Angeles FC	1–1	Whitecaps FC	Los Angeles, California
7:30 PM PDT	Fall 45+2'; Rodríguez (yellow card) 80'	Report	Dájome 14'; Teibert (yellow card) 82'	Stadium: Banc of California Stadium; Attendance: 22,221; Referee: Alex Chilowicz

November 7 34 Cascadia Cup	Whitecaps FC	1–1	Seattle Sounders FC	Vancouver, BC
3:00 PM PST	Gauld 20'	Report	Montero 8' (pen.); Tolo (yellow card) 31'; Andrade (yellow card) 31'; Leyva (yellow card) 80'	Stadium: BC Place; Attendance: 25,117; Referee: Fotis Bazakos

=== Playoffs ===
November 20 First round	Sporting Kansas City	3–1	Whitecaps FC	Kansas City, Kansas
1:00 PM PST	Shelton 17'; Isimat-Mirin 45+3'; Zusi 58'	Report	Dájome 39' (pen.); Gaspar (yellow card) 86'; Cavallini (yellow card) 89'; Godoy (yellow card) 90+2'	Stadium: Children's Mercy Park; Attendance: 19,817; Referee: Alan Kelly

== Canadian Championship ==
August 26 Preliminary round	Pacific FC	4–3	Whitecaps FC	Langford, British Columbia
7:00 pm	Campbell 8' (pen.), (yellow card) 43'; Aparicio (yellow card) 16', (goal) 28'; Heard 63'; Díaz 76'; Haynes (yellow card) 90+1'; Blasco (yellow card) 90+7'	Report	Nerwinski (yellow card) 8'; Gauld 14', 66'; Rose (yellow card) 75'; Dájome (penalty missed) 90+8', 90+8'	Stadium: Starlight Stadium; Attendance: 4,997; Referee: Juan Marquez

== Statistics ==
=== Appearances and goals ===
No.	Pos	Nat	Player	Total		MLS		Canadian Championship		MLS Cup Playoffs	
No.	Pos	Nat	Player	Apps	Goals	Apps	Goals	Apps	Goals	Apps	Goals
Goalkeepers
1	GK	(Canada) CAN	Thomas Hasal	7	0	7	0	0	0	0	0
12	GK	(United States) USA	Evan Newton	0	0	0	0	0	0	0	0
16	GK	(Canada) CAN	Maxime Crepeau	29	0	27	0	1	0	1	0
Defenders
2	DF	(Canada) CAN	Marcus Godinho	5	0	1+3	0	0	0	1	0
3	DF	(Chile) CHI	Cristián Gutiérrez	19	0	17+2	0	0	0	0	0
4	DF	(Serbia) SRB	Ranko Veselinović	28	1	22+5	1	1	0	0	0
6	DF	(Angola) ANG	Bruno Gaspar	18	1	11+6	1	0	0	1	0
22	DF	(Argentina) ARG	Érik Godoy	18	1	15+2	1	0	0	0+1	0
23	DF	(Jamaica) JAM	Javain Brown	27	0	19+6	0	1	0	0+1	0
26	DF	(Germany) GER	Florian Jungwirth	16	1	12+2	1	0+1	0	1	0
28	DF	(United States) USA	Jake Nerwinski	27	1	19+6	1	1	0	1	0
Midfielders
8	MF	(Brazil) BRA	Caio Alexandre	15	0	11+4	0	0	0	0	0
15	MF	(England) ENG	Andy Rose	21	2	19	2	1	0	1	0
17	MF	(Ghana) GHA	Leonard Owusu	26	0	14+10	0	0+1	0	1	0
19	MF	(Guinea-Bissau) GBS	Janio Bikel	34	1	26+7	1	1	0	0	0
25	MF	(Scotland) SCO	Ryan Gauld	20	6	13+5	4	1	2	1	0
27	MF	(Canada) CAN	Ryan Raposo	22	0	3+18	0	1	0	0	0
30	MF	(Canada) CAN	Kamron Habibullah	3	0	0+3	0	0	0	0	0
31	MF	(Canada) CAN	Russell Teibert	35	1	29+4	1	0+1	0	1	0
32	MF	(Canada) CAN	Patrick Metcalfe	14	0	4+9	0	1	0	0	0
45	MF	(Ecuador) ECU	Pedro Vite	0	0	0	0	0	0	0	0
55	MF	(Canada) CAN	Michael Baldisimo	21	0	12+9	0	0	0	0	0
Forwards
7	FW	(Colombia) COL	Déiber Caicedo	35	5	24+9	5	0+1	0	0+1	0
9	FW	(Canada) CAN	Lucas Cavallini	22	3	14+7	3	0	0	0+1	0
11	FW	(Colombia) COL	Cristian Dájome	35	12	31+2	10	1	1	1	1
24	FW	(United States) USA	Brian White	29	12	23+4	12	1	0	1	0
87	FW	(Canada) CAN	Tosaint Ricketts	15	0	0+14	0	0+1	0	0	0
Players transferred out during the season
13	DF	(Canada) CAN	Derek Cornelius	5	0	1+4	0	0	0	0	0
14	FW	(Canada) CAN	Theo Bair	4	0	0+4	0	0	0	0	0
18	FW	(Nigeria) NGR	David Egbo	0	0	0	0	0	0	0	0
34	DF	(Canada) CAN	Gianfranco Facchineri	0	0	0	0	0	0	0	0
53	DF	(Iraq) IRQ	Ali Adnan	0	0	0	0	0	0	0	0
60	GK	(Canada) CAN	Isaac Boehmer	0	0	0	0	0	0	0	0
61	MF	(Canada) CAN	Matteo Campagna	0	0	0	0	0	0	0	0
62	MF	(Canada) CAN	Damiano Pecile	0	0	0	0	0	0	0	0

Last updated: November 20, 2021
Source: Competitions

=== Goalscorers ===
Rank	No.	Pos	Nat	Name	MLS	Canadian Championship	MLS Cup Playoffs	Total
1	24	FW	(United States)	Brian White	12	0	0	12
1	11	FW	(Colombia)	Cristian Dájome	10	1	1	12
3	25	MF	(Scotland)	Ryan Gauld	4	2	0	6
4	7	FW	(Colombia)	Déiber Caicedo	5	0	0	5
5	9	FW	(Canada)	Lucas Cavallini	3	0	0	3
6	15	MF	(England)	Andy Rose	2	0	0	2
7	4	DF	(Serbia)	Ranko Veselinović	1	0	0	1
7	6	DF	(Angola)	Bruno Gaspar	1	0	0	1
7	19	MF	(Guinea-Bissau)	Janio Bikel	1	0	0	1
7	22	DF	(Argentina)	Érik Godoy	1	0	0	1
7	26	DF	(Germany)	Florian Jungwirth	1	0	0	1
7	28	DF	(United States)	Jake Nerwinski	1	0	0	1
7	31	MF	(Canada)	Russell Teibert	1	0	0	1
Own goals					2	0	0	2
Totals					45	3	0	48

As of November 20, 2021

=== Clean sheets ===
Rank	No.	Pos	Nat	Name	MLS	Canadian Championship	MLS Cup Playoffs	Total
1	16	GK	(Canada)	Maxime Crépeau	6	0	0	6
2	1	GK	(Canada)	Thomas Hasal	1	0	0	1
Totals					7	0	0	7

=== Disciplinary record ===
As of November 20, 2021

No.	Pos	Nat	Player	MLS			Canadian Championship			MLS Cup Playoffs			Total		
No.	Pos	Nat	Player	Yellow card	(yellow card) (yellow-red card)	Red card	Yellow card	(yellow card) (yellow-red card)	Red card	Yellow card	(yellow card) (yellow-red card)	Red card	Yellow card	(yellow card) (yellow-red card)	Red card
1	GK	(Canada)	Thomas Hasal	0	0	0	0	0	0	0	0	0	0	0	0
2	DF	(Canada)	Marcus Godinho	0	0	0	0	0	0	0	0	0	0	0	0
3	DF	(Chile)	Cristián Gutiérrez	1	0	0	0	0	0	0	0	0	1	0	0
4	DF	(Serbia)	Ranko Veselinović	3	0	0	0	0	0	0	0	0	3	0	0
6	DF	(Angola)	Bruno Gaspar	3	0	0	0	0	0	1	0	0	4	0	0
7	FW	(Colombia)	Déiber Caicedo	3	0	0	0	0	0	0	0	0	3	0	0
8	MF	(Brazil)	Caio Alexandre	5	0	0	0	0	0	0	0	0	5	0	0
9	FW	(Canada)	Lucas Cavallini	6	0	0	0	0	0	1	0	0	7	0	0
11	FW	(Colombia)	Cristian Dájome	4	0	0	0	0	0	0	0	0	4	0	0
12	GK	(United States)	Evan Newton	0	0	0	0	0	0	0	0	0	0	0	0
13	DF	(Canada)	Derek Cornelius	2	0	0	0	0	0	0	0	0	2	0	0
14	FW	(Canada)	Theo Bair	0	0	0	0	0	0	0	0	0	0	0	0
15	MF	(England)	Andy Rose	1	0	0	1	0	0	0	0	0	2	0	0
16	GK	(Canada)	Maxime Crépeau	1	0	0	0	0	0	0	0	0	1	0	0
17	MF	(Ghana)	Leonard Owusu	2	0	0	0	0	0	0	0	0	2	0	0
18	FW	(Nigeria)	David Egbo	0	0	0	0	0	0	0	0	0	0	0	0
19	MF	(Guinea-Bissau)	Janio Bikel	4	0	0	0	0	0	0	0	0	4	0	0
22	DF	(Argentina)	Érik Godoy	1	0	0	0	0	0	1	0	0	2	0	0
23	DF	(Jamaica)	Javain Brown	3	0	0	0	0	0	0	0	0	3	0	0
24	FW	(United States)	Brian White	2	0	0	0	0	0	0	0	0	2	0	0
25	MF	(Scotland)	Ryan Gauld	1	0	0	0	0	0	0	0	0	1	0	0
26	DF	(Germany)	Florian Jungwirth	2	0	0	0	0	0	0	0	0	2	0	0
27	MF	(Canada)	Ryan Raposo	0	0	0	0	0	0	0	0	0	0	0	0
28	DF	(United States)	Jake Nerwinski	2	0	0	1	0	0	0	0	0	3	0	0
30	MF	(Canada)	Kamron Habibullah	0	0	0	0	0	0	0	0	0	0	0	0
31	MF	(Canada)	Russell Teibert	1	0	0	0	0	0	0	0	0	1	0	0
32	MF	(Canada)	Patrick Metcalfe	1	0	0	0	0	0	0	0	0	1	0	0
34	DF	(Canada)	Gianfranco Facchineri	0	0	0	0	0	0	0	0	0	0	0	0
45	MF	(Ecuador)	Pedro Vite	0	0	0	0	0	0	0	0	0	0	0	0
55	MF	(Canada)	Michael Baldisimo	6	0	0	0	0	0	0	0	0	6	0	0
60	GK	(Canada)	Isaac Boehmer	0	0	0	0	0	0	0	0	0	0	0	0
61	MF	(Canada)	Matteo Campagna	0	0	0	0	0	0	0	0	0	0	0	0
62	MF	(Canada)	Damiano Pecile	0	0	0	0	0	0	0	0	0	0	0	0
87	FW	(Canada)	Tosaint Ricketts	1	0	0	0	0	0	0	0	0	1	0	0
–	DF	(Iraq)	Ali Adnan	0	0	0	0	0	0	0	0	0	0	0	0
Totals				55	0	0	2	0	0	0	0	0	57	0	0
