= 2020 Vancouver Whitecaps FC season =

Vancouver Whitecaps FC 2020 soccer season

Vancouver Whitecaps FC
- Chairman: Jeff Mallett
- Head coach: Marc Dos Santos
- Stadium: BC Place (Capacity: 22,120); Providence Park (Capacity: 25,218)
- Major League Soccer: Conference:9th; Overall:17th
- MLS Cup Playoffs: Did not qualify
- Canadian Championship: Did not qualify
- MLS is Back Tournament: Round of 16
- Top goalscorer: League: Lucas Cavallini (6); All: Lucas Cavallini (6)
- Highest home attendance: League/All:
- Lowest home attendance: League/All:
- Average home league attendance: 22,120
- Biggest win: 3–0 (vs LA Galaxy, November 8)
- Biggest defeat: 0–6 (at LAFC, September 23)
Home colours	Away colours

The 2020 Vancouver Whitecaps FC season was the club's tenth season in Major League Soccer, the top division of soccer in the United States and Canada. Including previous iterations of the franchise, it was the 43rd season of professional soccer being played in Vancouver under a variation of the "Whitecaps" name.

Around September and towards the end of the season, COVID-19 cross-border restrictions imposed by the Canadian government forced the Whitecaps to play the remaining home matches at Providence Park in Portland, Oregon.

On November 16, 2019, the Whitecaps named Axel Schuster as the club's new sporting director.

== Roster ==
As of September 30, 2020

No.	Player	Nationality	Position	Date of birth (age)	Previous club
Goalkeepers
1	Bryan Meredith	(United States)	GK	August 2, 1989 (age 37)	(United States) Inter Miami CF
16	Maxime Crépeau	(Canada)	GK	April 11, 1994 (age 32)	(Canada) Montreal Impact
30	Evan Bush	(United States)	GK	March 6, 1986 (age 40)	(Canada) Montreal Impact
51	Thomas Hasal	(Canada)	GK	July 9, 1999 (age 27)	(Canada) Vancouver Whitecaps FC U-23
60	Isaac Boehmer	(Canada)	GK	November 20, 2001 (age 24)	(Canada) Vancouver Whitecaps Development Squad
Defenders
3	Cristián Gutiérrez	(Chile)	DF	February 18, 1997 (age 29)	(Chile) Colo-Colo
4	Ranko Veselinović	(Serbia)	DF	March 24, 1999 (age 27)	(Serbia) Vojvodina
13	Derek Cornelius	(Canada)	DF	November 25, 1997 (age 28)	(Serbia) Javor Ivanjica
20	Jasser Khmiri	(Tunisia)	DF	July 27, 1997 (age 29)	(Tunisia) Stade Tunisien
22	Érik Godoy	(Argentina)	DF	August 16, 1993 (age 33)	(Argentina) Colón
28	Jake Nerwinski	(United States)	DF	October 17, 1994 (age 32)	(United States) Connecticut Huskies
34	Gianfranco Facchineri	(Canada)	DF	April 27, 2002 (age 24)	(Canada) Vancouver Whitecaps Development Squad
53	Ali Adnan	(Iraq)	DF	December 19, 1993 (age 32)	(Italy) Udinese
56	Georges Mukumbilwa	(Canada)	DF	September 23, 1999 (age 27)	(Canada) Vancouver Whitecaps FC Residency
Midfielders
15	Andy Rose	(England)	MF	February 13, 1990 (age 36)	(Scotland) Motherwell
17	Leonard Owusu	(Ghana)	MF	June 3, 1997 (age 29)	(Israel) Ashdod
19	Janio Bikel	(Portugal)	MF	June 28, 1995 (age 31)	(Bulgaria) CSKA Sofia
27	Ryan Raposo	(Canada)	MF	March 5, 1999 (age 27)	(United States) Syracuse Orange
31	Russell Teibert	(Canada)	MF	December 22, 1992 (age 33)	(Canada) Vancouver Whitecaps (USSF-D2)
32	Patrick Metcalfe	(Canada)	MF	November 11, 1998 (age 28)	(Canada) Vancouver Whitecaps Development Squad
55	Michael Baldisimo	(Canada)	MF	April 13, 2000 (age 26)	(Canada) Vancouver Whitecaps FC Residency
62	Damiano Pecile	(Canada)	MF	April 11, 2002 (age 24)	(Canada) Vancouver Whitecaps Development Squad
Forwards
7	David Milinković	(France)	FW	May 20, 1994 (age 32)	(England) Hull City
9	Lucas Cavallini	(Canada)	FW	December 28, 1992 (age 33)	(Mexico) Club Puebla
11	Cristian Dájome	(Colombia)	FW	January 3, 1994 (age 32)	(Colombia) Atlético Nacional
12	Fredy Montero	(Colombia)	FW	July 26, 1987 (age 39)	(Portugal) Sporting CP
14	Theo Bair	(Canada)	FW	August 27, 1999 (age 27)	(Canada) Vancouver Whitecaps FC Residency
87	Tosaint Ricketts	(Canada)	FW	August 6, 1987 (age 39)	(Lithuania) Sūduva
Out on Loan
54	Simon Colyn	(Canada)	MF	March 23, 2002 (age 24)	(Canada) Vancouver Whitecaps FC Residency

== Transfers ==
=== In ===
==== Transferred in ====
#	Position	Player	Transferred from	Fee/notes	Date	Source
9	FW	(Canada) Lucas Cavallini	(Mexico) Club Puebla	~$6,000,000	December 16, 2019	
27	MF	(Canada) Ryan Raposo	(United States) Syracuse Orange	2020 MLS SuperDraft, Generation Adidas	January 9, 2020	
3	DF	(Chile) Cristián Gutiérrez		Free	January 16, 2020	
11	FW	(Colombia) Cristian Dájome	(Colombia) Atlético Nacional	Undisclosed TAM	January 17, 2020	
17	MF	(Ghana) Leonard Owusu	(Israel) Ashdod	Undisclosed TAM	January 21, 2020	
22	DF	(Argentina) Érik Godoy	(Argentina) Colón	Undisclosed TAM	January 22, 2020	
34	DF	(Canada) Gianfranco Facchineri	(Canada) Vancouver Whitecaps Development Squad	Homegrown player	January 23, 2020	
32	MF	(Canada) Patrick Metcalfe	(Canada) Vancouver Whitecaps Development Squad	Homegrown player	January 23, 2020	
1	GK	(United States) Bryan Meredith	(United States) Inter Miami CF	Acquired in exchange for a fourth-round selection in the 2021 MLS SuperDraft.	January 29, 2020	
62	MF	(Canada) Damiano Pecile	(Canada) Vancouver Whitecaps Development Squad	Homegrown player	February 14, 2020	
19	MF	(Portugal) Janio Bikel	(Bulgaria) CSKA Sofia	Undisclosed	February 28, 2020	
60	GK	(Canada) Isaac Boehmer	(Canada) Vancouver Whitecaps Development Squad	Homegrown player	August 17, 2020	
30	GK	(United States) Evan Bush	(Canada) Montreal Impact	Acquired in exchange for a third-round pick in the 2021 MLS SuperDraft	September 28, 2020	
4	DF	(Serbia) Ranko Veselinović	(Serbia) Vojvodina	Undisclosed	October 18, 2020	

==== Loans in ====
#	Position	Player	Loaned from	Date	Loan expires	Source
7	FW	(France) David Milinković	(England) Hull City	January 27, 2020	December 31, 2020	
4	DF	(Serbia) Ranko Veselinović	(Serbia) Vojvodina	February 9, 2020	October 18, 2020	
40	GK	(Canada) Jonathan Sirois	(Canada) Montreal Impact	July 22, 2020	July 23, 2020	

=== Out ===
==== Transferred out ====
#	Position	Player	Transferred to	Fee/notes	Date	Source
9	FW	(Venezuela) Anthony Blondell	(Chile) Huachipato	undisclosed	October 17, 2019	
39	GK	(Canada) Sean Melvin	(United States) Colorado Springs Switchbacks	option declined	October 17, 2019	
26	DF	(United States) Brendan McDonough		option declined	October 17, 2019	
23	DF	(Switzerland) Scott Sutter		option declined	October 17, 2019	
46	DF	(Canada) Brett Levis		out of contract	October 17, 2019	
2	DF	(Canada) Doneil Henry	(South Korea) Suwon Samsung Bluewings	undisclosed	November 20, 2019	
94	DF	(Brazil) PC		option declined	November 20, 2019	
18	GK	(United States) Zac MacMath	(United States) Real Salt Lake	traded for $50,000 TAM	December 17, 2019	
24	MF	(Canada) David Norman Jr.	(United States) Inter Miami CF	traded for a conditional 2022 MLS SuperDraft pick	January 1, 2020	
6	MF	(Spain) Jon Erice		mutual contract termination	January 15, 2020	
6	MF	(South Korea) Hwang In-beom	(Russia) Rubin Kazan	undisclosed	August 14, 2020	
29	MF	(Peru) Yordy Reyna	(United States) D.C. United	traded with an international roster spot for $400,000 GAM	September 19, 2020	

==== Loans out ====
#	Position	Player	Loaned to	Date	Loan expires	Source
34	DF	(Canada) Gianfranco Facchineri	(Canada) Atlético Ottawa	July 6, 2020	September 30, 2020	
54	MF	(Canada) Simon Colyn	(Italy) SPAL	October 7, 2020	June 30, 2021	

== Major League Soccer ==
=== Preseason ===
January 28, 2020	Columbus Crew	1–1	Whitecaps FC	San Diego, California
13:00 (PST)	Santos 40'	Report	Raposo 51'	Stadium: Triton Soccer Stadium

February 1, 2020	FC Dallas	1–4	Whitecaps FC	San Diego, California
11:00 (PST)	Ondrasek 30'	Report	Raposo 21'; Adnan 35'; Teibert 39'; Reyna 80'	Stadium: Triton Soccer Stadium

February 4, 2020	LA Galaxy	4–1	Whitecaps FC	Carson, California
12:30 (PST)	13'; 30'; 52'; 78'	Report	Cavallini 49'	Stadium: Dignity Health Sports Park

February 16, 2020	Portland Timbers	2–1	Whitecaps FC	Portland, Oregon
17:00 (PST)	Mabiala (yellow card) 27'; Valeri 34' (pen.); Polo 46'	Report	Khmiri (yellow card) 26'; Cavallini 39'; Adnan (yellow card) 40'	Stadium: Providence Park; Attendance: 13,882; Referee: Joe Dickerson

February 19, 2020	New England Revolution	0–2	Whitecaps FC	Portland, Oregon
17:00 (PST)	Buchanan (yellow card) 39'	Report	Dájome (yellow card) 36'; Adnan (yellow card) 64' (goal) 71'; Cavallini 68'; Milinković (yellow card) 69'	Stadium: Providence Park; Referee: Ramy Touchan

February 22, 2020	Minnesota United FC	1–2	Whitecaps FC	Portland, Oregon
14:30 (PST)	Finlay 7'; Alonso (yellow card) 20'; Gasper (yellow card) 36'; Boxall (yellow card) 90+3'	Report	Milinković (yellow card) 20'; Cavallini 65' (pen.); Montero 90'	Stadium: Providence Park

=== Regular season ===
==== League tables ====
===== Western Conference =====
Pos	Team	Pld	W	L	T	GF	GA	GD	Pts	PPG	Qualification
7	Los Angeles FC	22	9	8	5	47	39	+8	32	1.45	Qualification for the first round
8	San Jose Earthquakes	23	8	9	6	35	51	−16	30	1.30	Qualification for the first round
9	Vancouver Whitecaps FC (Note: Canadian clubs could not qualify for the 2021 CONCACAF Champions League through the MLS regular season or playoffs.)	23	9	14	0	27	44	−17	27	1.17	
10	LA Galaxy	22	6	12	4	27	46	−19	22	1.00	
11	Real Salt Lake	22	5	10	7	25	35	−10	22	1.00	

Source: MLS
Rules for classification: 1) points per game; 2) total wins per match played; 3) total goal differential per match played; 4) total goals scored per match played; 5) fewest disciplinary points per match played; 6) away goal differential per away match played; 7) away goals scored per away match played; 8) home goal differential per home match played; 9) home goals scored per home match played; 10) coin toss or drawing of lots.

===== Overall =====
2020 MLS overall standings
Pos	Team	Pld	W	L	T	GF	GA	GD	Pts	PPG
15	New England Revolution	23	8	7	8	26	25	+1	32	1.39
16	San Jose Earthquakes	23	8	9	6	35	51	−16	30	1.30
17	Vancouver Whitecaps FC	23	9	14	0	27	44	−17	27	1.17
18	Montreal Impact	23	8	13	2	33	43	−10	26	1.13
19	Inter Miami CF	23	7	13	3	25	35	−10	24	1.04

Source: MLS
Rules for classification: 1) points per game; 2) total wins per match played; 3) total goal differential per match played; 4) total goals scored per match played; 5) fewest disciplinary points per match played; 6) away goal differential per away match played; 7) away goals scored per away match played; 8) home goal differential per home match played; 9) home goals scored per home match played; 10) coin toss or drawing of lots.

==== Results ====
Overall								Home						Away					
Pld	Pts	W	L	D	GF	GA	GD	W	L	D	GF	GA	GD	W	L	D	GF	GA	GD
23	27	9	14	0	27	44	−17	6	5	0	21	20	+1	3	9	0	6	24	−18

Last updated: November 8, 2020
Pld = Matches played; Pts = Points; W = Matches won; T = Matches tied; L = Matches lost; GF = Goals for; GA = Goals against; GD = Goal difference

Round	1	2	3	4	5	6	7	8	9	10	11	12	13	14	15	16	17	18	19	20	21	22	23
Ground	H	A	N	N	N	A	A	A	H	H	H	A	A	H	A	A	H	H	A	H	H	A	H
Result	L	W	L	L	W	L	L	L	W	L	W	W	L	L	L	L	W	W	L	W	L	L	W

Updated to match(es) played on November 8, 2020. Source:
A = Away; H = Home; N = Neutral; W = Win; D = Draw; L = Loss

==== Matches ====
February 29, 2020 1	Whitecaps FC	1–3	Sporting Kansas City	Vancouver, British Columbia
19:30 (PST)	Cornelius (yellow card) 23'; Nerwinski 28'	Report	Kinda (yellow card) 3' (goal) 39'; Pulido 17'; Shelton (yellow card) 57'; Hurtado 90+5'	Stadium: BC Place; Attendance: 22,120; Referee: Ted Unkel

March 7, 2020 2	LA Galaxy	0–1	Whitecaps FC	Carson, California
19:00 (PST)	Katai (yellow card) 34'; Corona (yellow card) 68' (yellow-red card) 75'; Bingham (yellow card) 88'	Report	Ricketts 74'	Stadium: Dignity Health Sports Park; Attendance: 26,382; Referee: Ismail Elfath

July 15, 2020 3 MLSiBT Group stage	Whitecaps FC	3–4	San Jose Earthquakes	Bay Lake, Florida
6:00 pm PDT	Adnan 7'; Judson 22' (o.g.); Dájome 59'; Khmiri (yellow card) 76'	Report	Ríos 45+2'; Espinoza (yellow card) 56'; Wondolowski 72'; Alanís 81'; Yueill (yellow card) 90+3'; Salinas 90+8'; Fierro (yellow card) 90+10'	Stadium: ESPN Wide World of Sports Complex; Referee: Chris Ruska

July 19, 2020 4 MLSiBT Group stage	Seattle Sounders FC	3–0	Whitecaps FC	Bay Lake, Florida
7:30 pm PDT	Lodeiro 16' (pen.); Morris 34'; Leerdam (yellow card) 40'; Ruidíaz 51'	Report	Khmiri (yellow card) 16'; Reyna (yellow card) 30'	Stadium: ESPN Wide World of Sports Complex; Referee: Robert Sibiga

July 23, 2020 5 MLSiBT Group stage	Chicago Fire FC	0–2	Whitecaps FC	Bay Lake, Florida
6:00 am PDT	Giménez (yellow card) 81'; Herbers (yellow card) 90+2'	Report	Reyna 65'; Hasal (yellow card) 71'; Dájome 71'	Stadium: ESPN Wide World of Sports Complex; Referee: Armando Villarreal
Note: Match postponed due to the COVID-19 pandemic

August 18, 2020 6 C.C.Q	Toronto FC	3–0	Whitecaps FC	Toronto, Ontario
17:00 (PST)	Piatti 27', 55'; Auro Jr. (yellow card) 80'; DeLeon 83'	Report	Cavallini (yellow card) 18'; Teibert (yellow card) 76'	Stadium: BMO Field; Attendance: 0 Referee: David Gantar

August 21, 2020 7 C.C.Q	Toronto FC	1–0	Whitecaps FC	Toronto, Ontario
17:00 (PST)	Laryea 15'; Fraser (yellow card) 36'; Piatti (yellow card) 84'; Pozuelo (yellow card) 86'	Report	Rose (yellow card) 55'	Stadium: BMO Field; Attendance: 0 Referee: Silviu Petrescu

August 25, 2020 8 C.C.Q	Montreal Impact	2–0	Whitecaps FC	Montreal, Quebec
17:00 (PST)	Quioto 18'; Lappalainen 40'; Jackson-Hamel (yellow card) 85'	Report	Cornelius (yellow card) 85'	Stadium: Stade Saputo; Attendance: 250; Referee: Drew Fischer

September 5, 2020 9 C.C.Q	Whitecaps FC	3–2	Toronto FC	Vancouver, British Columbia
18:30 (PST)	Cavallini 17' (yellow card) 78'; Adnan (yellow card) 44'; Baldisimo 57' (yellow card) 82'; Nerwinski 76'; Raposo (yellow card) 90+7'	Report	Osorio 25'; Pozuelo 71'; Ciman (yellow card) 76'; Auro Jr. (yellow card) 86'	Stadium: BC Place; Attendance: 0 Referee: Silviu Petrescu

September 13, 2020 10 C.C.Q	Whitecaps FC	2–4	Montreal Impact	Vancouver, British Columbia
18:30 (PST)	Bair 7'; Cavallini (yellow card) 24' (yellow-red card) 57'; Camacho 66' (o.g.); Dájome (yellow card) 69'; Baldisimo (yellow card) 74'; Montero (yellow card) 86'	Report	Okwonkwo 15'; Taïder 45+1' (pen.); Piette 51'; Quioto 60'; Maciel (red card) 72'	Stadium: BC Place; Attendance: 0 Referee: Pierre-Luc Lauziere

September 16, 2020 11 C.C.Q	Whitecaps FC	3–1	Montreal Impact	Vancouver, British Columbia
18:30 (PST)	Veselinović (yellow card) 31'; Montero 41' (pen.), 78'; Dájome 44'	Report	Camacho (red card) 37'; Piette (yellow card) 45+1'; Quioto 70'	Stadium: BC Place; Attendance: 0 Referee: Drew Fischer

September 19, 2020 12	Real Salt Lake	1–2	Whitecaps FC	Sandy, Utah
18:30 (PST)	Beckerman (yellow card) 8' (yellow-red card) 63'; Toia (yellow card) 68'; Meram 81'; Baird (yellow card) 90+2'	Report	Bikel (yellow card) 15'; Adnan (yellow card) 41'; Milinković 53'; Cavallini 84'; Hasal (yellow card) 90+1'	Stadium: Rio Tinto Stadium; Attendance: 3409; Referee: Kevin Stott

September 23, 2020 13	Los Angeles FC	6–0	Whitecaps FC	Los Angeles, California
19:30 (PST)	Jakovic 2'; Wright-Phillipss 5', 11'; Veselinović 14' (o.g.); Rossi 33'; Rose 68' (o.g.); Harvey (yellow card) 83'	Report	Baldisimo (yellow card) 27'	Stadium: Banc of California Stadium; Referee: Rubiel Vazquez

September 27, 2020 14	Whitecaps FC	0–1	Portland Timbers	Portland, Oregon
19:00 (PST)	Gutiérrez (yellow card) 8'; Cavallini (yellow card) 40'; Bikel (yellow card) 45+1'	Report	Mora 5'; Farfan (yellow card) 45+3'; Paredes (yellow card) 49'	Stadium: Providence Park; Referee: Ted Unkel

October 3, 2020 15	Seattle Sounders FC	3–1	Whitecaps FC	Seattle, Washington
19:00 (PST)	João Paulo 46', (yellow card) 49'; Ruidíaz 58'; Gómez Andrade (yellow card) 65'	Report	Bikel (yellow card) 26', (red card) 68'; Cavallini (yellow card) 52'; Godoy 52' (o.g.); Montero 65' (pen.)	Stadium: CenturyLink Field; Referee: Timothy Ford

October 7, 2020 16	San Jose Earthquakes	3–0	Whitecaps FC	San Jose, California
19:30 (PST)	Jungwirth (yellow card) 45+3'; Espinoza 59'; Ríos 66'; Marie 90+3'	Report	Rose (yellow card) 17' (yellow-red card) 52'; Baldisimo (yellow card) 60'; Godoy (red card) 75'	Stadium: Earthquakes Stadium; Referee: Allen Chapman

October 10, 2020 17	Whitecaps FC	2–1	Real Salt Lake	Portland, Oregon
19:00 (PST)	Montero (yellow card) 14'; Bikel (yellow card) 43'; Cavallini (yellow card) 61' (goal) 75'; Martínez 71' (o.g.); Dájome (yellow card) 79'; Veselinović (yellow card) 90+7'	Report	Silva (yellow card) 23'; Kreilach 37'; Ruíz (yellow card) 40'; Herrera (yellow card) 58'; Martínez (yellow card) 76'	Stadium: Providence Park; Referee: Silviu Petrescu

October 14, 2020 18	Whitecaps FC	2–1	Los Angeles FC	Portland, Oregon
19:00 (PST)	Cavallini 30', 59'; Bush (yellow card) 83'; Bikel (yellow card) 89'	Report	Segura (yellow card) 49'; Atuesta 83' (pen.); Dueñas (yellow card) 90+3'	Stadium: Providence Park; Referee: Tori Penso

October 18, 2020 19	LA Galaxy	1–0	Whitecaps FC	Carson, California
19:30 (PST)	Kitchen (yellow card) 45+1'; Koreniuk 90'; Harvey (yellow card) 90+2'	Report	Teibert (yellow card) 89'	Stadium: Dignity Health Sports Park; Referee: Victor Rivas

October 24, 2020 20	Whitecaps FC	2–1	San Jose Earthquakes	Portland, Oregon
19:00 (PST)	Adnan 51'; Ricketts 57'; Teibert (yellow card) 90+1'; Owusu (yellow card) 90+3'	Report	Fierro 24'; López (yellow card) 82'	Stadium: Providence Park; Referee: Marcos de Oliveira

October 27, 2020 21	Whitecaps FC	0–2	Seattle Sounders FC	Portland, Oregon
19:00 (PST)	Cavallini (yellow card) 62'; Dájome (yellow card) 84'; Cornelius (yellow card) 90'	Report	Ruidíaz 54'; Lodeiro 60'	Stadium: Providence Park; Referee: Fotis Bazakos

November 1, 2020 22	Portland Timbers	1–0	Whitecaps FC	Portland, Oregon
19:00 (PST)	Y. Chará 61'	Report	Baldisimo (yellow card) 88'	Stadium: Providence Park; Referee: Armando Villarreal

November 8, 2020 23	Whitecaps FC	3–0	LA Galaxy	Portland, Oregon
15:30 (PST)	Cavallini 24'; Montero 43', 90+1'	Report	Araujo (red card) 41'; Kitchen (yellow card) 52'	Stadium: Providence Park; Referee: Joseph Dickerson

== MLS is Back Tournament ==
As part of MLS's restart plan from the COVID-19 pandemic. The three group stage games will count towards the regular season standings. The winner of the tournament will qualify for the 2021 CONCACAF Champions League.

=== Group stage ===
Group B results
Pos	Team	Pld	W	D	L	GF	GA	GD	Pts	Qualification
1	San Jose Earthquakes	3	2	1	0	6	3	+3	7	Advance to knockout stage
2	Seattle Sounders FC	3	1	1	1	4	2	+2	4	Advance to knockout stage
3	Vancouver Whitecaps FC	3	1	0	2	5	7	−2	3	Advance to knockout stage
4	Chicago Fire	3	1	0	2	2	5	−3	3	

Source: MLS

July 15, 2020	Whitecaps FC	3–4	San Jose Earthquakes	Bay Lake, Florida
18:00 PDT	Adnan 7'; Judson 22' (o.g.); Dájome 59'; Khmiri (yellow card) 76'	Report	Ríos 45+2'; Espinoza (yellow card) 56'; Wondolowski 72'; Alanís 81'; Yueill (yellow card) 90+3'; Salinas 90+8'; Fierro (yellow card) 90+10'	Stadium: ESPN Wide World of Sports Complex; Referee: Marcos de Oliveira

July 19, 2020	Seattle Sounders FC	3–0	Whitecaps FC	Bay Lake, Florida
19:30 PDT	Lodeiro 16' (pen.); Morris 34'; Leerdam (yellow card) 40'; Ruidíaz 51'	Report	Khmiri (yellow card) 16'; Reyna (yellow card) 30'	Stadium: ESPN Wide World of Sports Complex; Referee: Robert Sibiga

July 23, 2020	Chicago Fire FC	0–2	Whitecaps FC	Bay Lake, Florida
06:00 PDT	Giménez (yellow card) 81'; Herbers (yellow card) 90+2'	Report	Reyna 65'; Hasal (yellow card) 71'; Dájome 71'	Stadium: ESPN Wide World of Sports Complex; Referee: Armando Villarreal

=== Knockout stage ===
July 26, 2020 Round of 16	Sporting Kansas City	0–0 (3–1 p)	Whitecaps FC	Bay Lake, Florida
20:00 PDT	Kinda (yellow card) 9'	Report	Owusu (yellow card) 47'; Gutiérrez (yellow card) 59'	Stadium: ESPN Wide World of Sports Complex; Referee: Victor Rivas
	Penalties
	Pulido (penalty scored); Ilie (penalty scored); Sallói (penalty missed); Busio (penalty scored)		(penalty missed) Dájome; (penalty scored) Owusu; (penalty missed) Derek Cornelius; (penalty missed) Reyna

== Canadian Championship ==
=== Qualification ===
As part of the MLS regular season, Canada's three Major League Soccer clubs will play each other three times from August 18 to September 16. The team with the most points from this series will qualify for the Canadian Championship.

Pos	Team	Pld	W	D	L	GF	GA	GD	Pts	Qualification
1	Toronto FC	6	4	0	2	9	5	+4	12	Qualification for the 2020 Canadian Championship and the 2021 CONCACAF Champions League
2	Montreal Impact	6	3	0	3	9	8	+1	9	
3	Vancouver Whitecaps FC	6	2	0	4	8	13	−5	6	

Source: MLS
Rules for classification: 1) points; 2) total wins; 3) goal differential; 4) goals for; 5) away goal differential; 6) away goals for; 7) home goal differential; 8) home goals for 9) coin toss or drawing of lots.

Overall								Home						Away					
Pld	Pts	W	L	D	GF	GA	GD	W	L	D	GF	GA	GD	W	L	D	GF	GA	GD
6	6	2	4	0	8	13	−5	2	1	0	8	7	+1	0	3	0	0	6	−6

Last updated: September 16, 2020
Pld = Matches played; Pts = Points; W = Matches won; T = Matches tied; L = Matches lost; GF = Goals for; GA = Goals against; GD = Goal difference

== Statistics ==
=== Appearances and goals ===
No.	Pos	Nat	Player	Total		MLS		MLS is Back	
No.	Pos	Nat	Player	Apps	Goals	Apps	Goals	Apps	Goals
Goalkeepers
1	GK	(United States) USA	Bryan Meredith	3	0	3	0	0	0
16	GK	(Canada) CAN	Maxime Crépeau	4	0	2	0	2	0
30	GK	(United States) USA	Evan Bush	8	0	8	0	0	0
51	GK	(Canada) CAN	Thomas Hasal	10	0	7	0	2+1	0
60	GK	(Canada) CAN	Isaac Boehmer	0	0	0	0	0	0
Defenders
3	DF	(Chile) CHI	Cristián Gutiérrez	13	0	7+3	0	1+2	0
4	DF	(Serbia) SRB	Ranko Veselinović	19	0	13+2	0	4	0
13	DF	(Canada) CAN	Derek Cornelius	14	0	10+1	0	2+1	0
20	DF	(Tunisia) TUN	Jasser Khmiri	5	0	2	0	3	0
22	DF	(Argentina) ARG	Érik Godoy	12	0	11+1	0	0	0
28	DF	(United States) USA	Jake Nerwinski	22	2	15+3	2	4	0
34	DF	(Canada) CAN	Gianfranco Facchineri	0	0	0	0	0	0
53	DF	(Iraq) IRQ	Ali Adnan	23	2	17+2	1	4	1
56	DF	(Canada) CAN	Georges Mukumbilwa	0	0	0	0	0	0
Midfielders
15	MF	(England) ENG	Andy Rose	13	0	10+3	0	0	0
17	MF	(Ghana) GHA	Leonard Owusu	21	0	11+6	0	4	0
19	MF	(Portugal) POR	Janio Bikel	12	0	12	0	0	0
27	MF	(Canada) CAN	Ryan Raposo	15	0	1+11	0	1+2	0
31	MF	(Canada) CAN	Russell Teibert	19	0	14+1	0	4	0
32	MF	(Canada) CAN	Patrick Metcalfe	7	0	2+4	0	0+1	0
55	MF	(Canada) CAN	Michael Baldisimo	13	1	7+6	1	0	0
62	MF	(Canada) CAN	Damiano Pecile	1	0	0+1	0	0	0
Forwards
7	FW	(France) FRA	David Milinković	14	1	7+4	1	2+1	0
9	FW	(Canada) CAN	Lucas Cavallini	18	6	16+2	6	0	0
11	FW	(Colombia) COL	Cristian Dájome	24	3	16+4	1	3+1	2
12	FW	(Colombia) COL	Fredy Montero	16	5	11+5	5	0	0
14	FW	(Canada) CAN	Theo Bair	17	1	5+8	1	2+2	0
87	FW	(Canada) CAN	Tosaint Ricketts	16	2	5+11	2	0	0
Players transferred out during the season
6	MF	(South Korea) KOR	Hwang In-beom	6	0	2	0	4	0
29	MF	(Peru) PER	Yordy Reyna	9	1	2+3	0	2+2	1
54	MF	(Canada) CAN	Simon Colyn	0	0	0	0	0	0

Last updated: November 8, 2020
Source: Competitions

=== Goalscorers ===
Rank	No.	Pos	Nat	Name	MLS	MLS is Back	Total
1	9	FW	(Canada)	Lucas Cavallini	6	0	6
2	12	FW	(Colombia)	Fredy Montero	5	0	5
3	11	FW	(Colombia)	Cristian Dájome	1	2	3
4	28	DF	(United States)	Jake Nerwinski	2	0	2
4	53	DF	(Iraq)	Ali Adnan	1	1	2
4	87	FW	(Canada)	Tosaint Ricketts	2	0	2
7	7	FW	(France)	David Milinković	1	0	1
7	14	FW	(Canada)	Theo Bair	1	0	1
7	29	MF	(Peru)	Yordy Reyna	0	1	1
7	55	MF	(Canada)	Michael Baldisimo	1	0	1
Own goals					2	1	3
Totals					22	5	27

As of November 8, 2020

=== Clean sheets ===
Rank	No.	Pos	Nat	Name	MLS	MLS is Back	Total
1	51	GK	(Canada)	Thomas Hasal	0	2	2
2	16	GK	(Canada)	Maxime Crepeau	1	0	1
2	30	GK	(United States)	Evan Bush	1	0	1
Totals					2	2	4

=== Disciplinary record ===
As of November 8, 2020

No.	Pos	Nat	Player	MLS			MLS is Back			Total		
No.	Pos	Nat	Player	Yellow card	(yellow card) (yellow-red card)	Red card	Yellow card	(yellow card) (yellow-red card)	Red card	Yellow card	(yellow card) (yellow-red card)	Red card
1	GK	(United States)	Bryan Meredith	0	0	0	0	0	0	0	0	0
3	DF	(Chile)	Cristián Gutiérrez	1	0	0	1	0	0	2	0	0
4	DF	(Serbia)	Ranko Veselinović	2	0	0	0	0	0	2	0	0
7	FW	(France)	David Milinković	0	0	0	0	0	0	0	0	0
9	FW	(Canada)	Lucas Cavallini	6	1	0	0	0	0	6	1	0
11	FW	(Colombia)	Cristian Dájome	3	0	0	0	0	0	3	0	0
12	FW	(Colombia)	Fredy Montero	2	0	0	0	0	0	2	0	0
13	DF	(Canada)	Derek Cornelius	3	0	0	0	0	0	3	0	0
14	FW	(Canada)	Theo Bair	0	0	0	0	0	0	0	0	0
15	MF	(England)	Andy Rose	2	1	0	0	0	0	2	1	0
16	GK	(Canada)	Maxime Crépeau	0	0	0	0	0	0	0	0	0
17	MF	(Ghana)	Leonard Owusu	1	0	0	1	0	0	2	0	0
19	MF	(Portugal)	Janio Bikel	5	0	1	0	0	0	5	0	1
20	DF	(Tunisia)	Jasser Khmiri	0	0	0	2	0	0	2	0	0
22	DF	(Argentina)	Érik Godoy	0	0	1	0	0	0	0	0	1
27	MF	(Canada)	Ryan Raposo	1	0	0	0	0	0	1	0	0
28	DF	(United States)	Jake Nerwinski	0	0	0	0	0	0	0	0	0
30	GK	(United States)	Evan Bush	1	0	0	0	0	0	1	0	0
31	MF	(Canada)	Russell Teibert	3	0	0	0	0	0	3	0	0
32	MF	(Canada)	Patrick Metcalfe	0	0	0	0	0	0	0	0	0
34	DF	(Canada)	Gianfranco Facchineri	0	0	0	0	0	0	0	0	0
51	GK	(Canada)	Thomas Hasal	1	0	0	1	0	0	2	0	0
53	DF	(Iraq)	Ali Adnan	2	0	0	0	0	0	2	0	0
55	MF	(Canada)	Michael Baldisimo	5	0	0	0	0	0	5	0	0
56	DF	(Canada)	Georges Mukumbilwa	0	0	0	0	0	0	0	0	0
60	GK	(Canada)	Isaac Boehmer	0	0	0	0	0	0	0	0	0
62	MF	(Canada)	Damiano Pecile	0	0	0	0	0	0	0	0	0
87	FW	(Canada)	Tosaint Ricketts	0	0	0	0	0	0	0	0	0
—	MF	(South Korea)	Hwang In-beom	0	0	0	0	0	0	0	0	0
—	MF	(Peru)	Yordy Reyna	0	0	0	1	0	0	1	0	0
–	MF	(Canada)	Simon Colyn	0	0	0	0	0	0	0	0	0
Totals				38	2	2	6	0	0	44	2	2
