= Leonard Owusu =

Ghanaian footballer

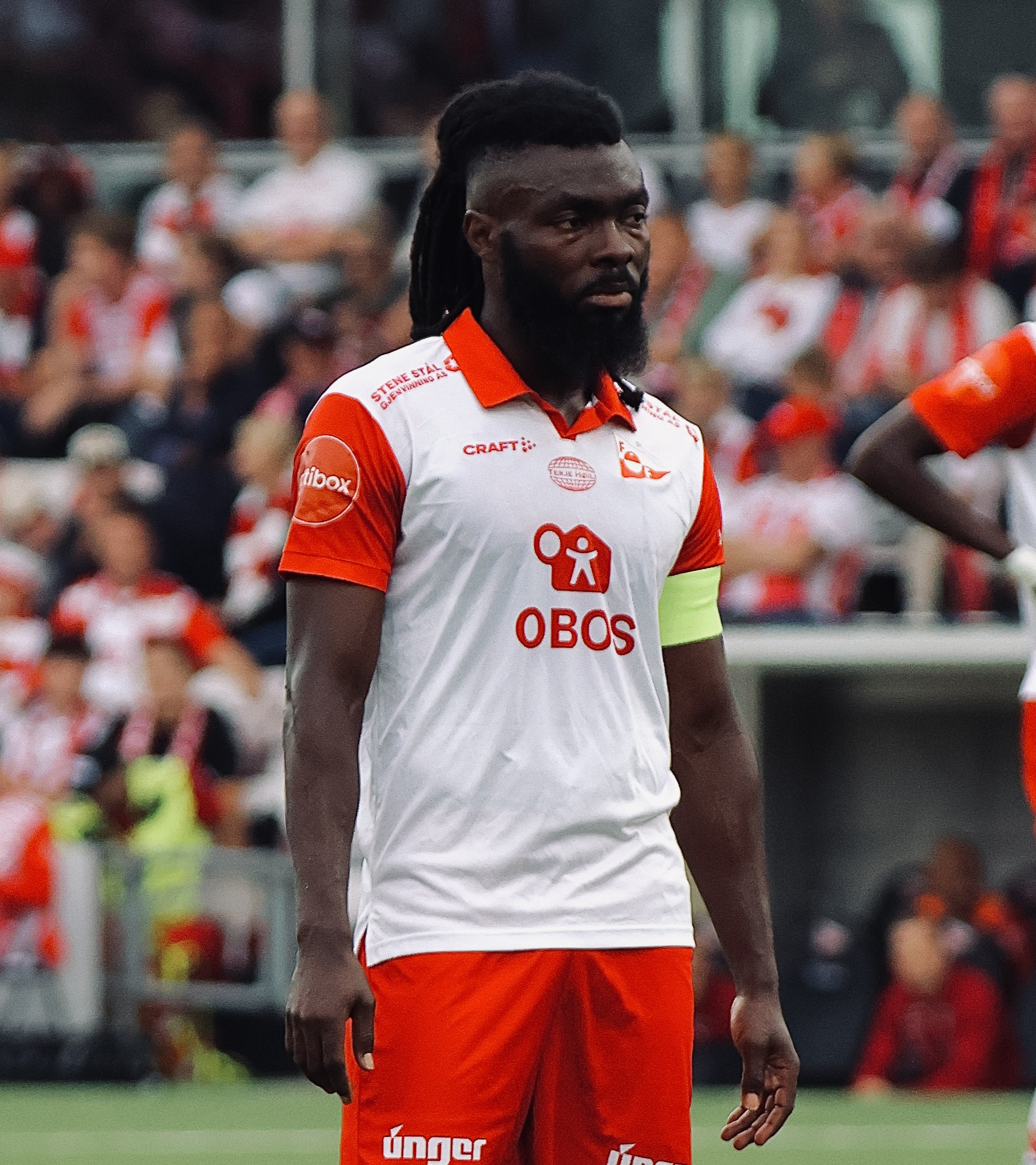
- Owusu in 2025

Personal information
- Date of birth: June 3, 1997 (age 29)
- Place of birth: Accra, Ghana
- Height: 1.81 m (5 ft 11 in)
- Position: Midfielder

Team information
- Current team: Fredrikstad (on loan from Partizan)
- Number: 24

Senior career*
Years	Team	Apps	(Gls)
2015–2019	Dreams	10	(3)
2018–2019	→ Ashdod (loan)	29	(0)
2019–2020	Ashdod	17	(0)
2020–2022	Vancouver Whitecaps FC	60	(0)
2023	Odd	25	(0)
2024–	Partizan	26	(0)
2025	→ Fredrikstad (loan)	29	(2)
2026–	→ Fredrikstad (loan)	15	(0)
- * Club domestic league appearances and goals as of 4 November 2026

Leonard Owusu (born June 3, 1997) is a Ghanaian professional footballer who plays as a midfielder for Norwegian side Fredrikstad, on loan from Serbian club Partizan.

== Career ==
=== Dreams ===
Owusu played and captained for Dreams in the 2015 Division One League, leading his team to promotion to the Ghana Premier League. He repeated the accomplishment in 2017, as the club returned to the top flight for the 2018 season.

=== Ashdod ===
On July 31, 2018, Owusu joined Ashdod of the Israeli Premier League on a season-long loan, with an option to make the transfer permanent on a three-year contract. The option was exercised the following season.

=== Vancouver Whitecaps FC ===
On January 21, 2020, it was announced that Owusu would be joining Vancouver Whitecaps FC of Major League Soccer on a contract through 2022 with options for 2023.

=== Partizan ===
On January 19, 2024, Owusu signed a three-year deal with Serbian SuperLiga side Partizan.

== Career statistics ==
As of 12 January 2026

Appearances and goals by club, season and competition
Club	Season	League			National cup		Continental		Other		Total	
Club	Season	Division	Apps	Goals	Apps	Goals	Apps	Goals	Apps	Goals	Apps	Goals
Dreams	2015	Division One League					—		—			
Dreams	2016	Ghana Premier League					—		—			
Dreams	2017	Division One League					—		—			
Dreams	2018	Ghana Premier League	10	3			—		—		10	3
Dreams	Total		10	3			—		—		10	3
Ashdod (loan)	2018–19	Israeli Premier League	29	0	2	0	—		—		31	0
Ashdod	2019–20	Israeli Premier League	17	0	1	0	—		—		18	0
Vancouver Whitecaps FC	2020	Major League Soccer	17	0	0	0	—		4 (Note: Appearances in the MLS is Back Tournament)	0	21	0
Vancouver Whitecaps FC	2021	Major League Soccer	24	0	1	0	—		1 (Note: Appearance in the Canadian Championship)	0	26	0
Vancouver Whitecaps FC	2022	Major League Soccer	19	0	0	0	—		2	0	21	0
Vancouver Whitecaps FC	Total		60	0	1	0	—		7	0	68	0
Odd	2023	Eliteserien	25	0	2	0	—		—		27	0
Partizan	2023–24	Serbian SuperLiga	18	0	2	0	0	0	—		20	0
Partizan	2024–25	Serbian SuperLiga	8	0	0	0	2	0	—		10	0
Partizan	Total		26	0	2	0	2	0	—		30	0
Fredrikstad	2025	Eliteserien	29	2	2	0	4	0	—		35	2
Career total			196	5	10	0	6	0	7	0	219	5
