= Damiano Pecile =

Canadian soccer player (born 2002)

Personal information
- Full name: Damiano Daniele Pecile
- Date of birth: April 11, 2002 (age 24)
- Place of birth: Vancouver, British Columbia, Canada
- Height: 1.89 m (6 ft 2 1/2 in)
- Position: Defensive midfielder

Team information
- Current team: Vancouver FC

Youth career
- Cliff Avenue United
- Burnaby Selects
- 2014–2015: Mountain United FC
- 2015–2022: Vancouver Whitecaps FC
- 2021–2022: → Venezia (loan)

Senior career*
Years	Team	Apps	(Gls)
2020–2022	Vancouver Whitecaps FC	1	(0)
2021–2022	→ Venezia (loan)	0	(0)
2022–2024	Venezia	0	(0)
2023	→ KTP (loan)	14	(0)
2024	→ Vis Pesaro (loan)	1	(0)
2025	Covilhã	1	(0)
2026–	Vancouver FC	25	(3)

International career^{‡}
2019	Canada U17	8	(0)
- * Club domestic league appearances and goals as of October 27, 2026 ‡ National team caps and goals as of November 2, 2019

Damiano Daniele Pecile (born April 11, 2002) is a Canadian professional soccer player who plays for Vancouver FC in the Canadian Premier League.

== Early life ==
Born in Vancouver, he grew up in Burnaby, British Columbia. He began playing youth soccer at age five with Cliff Avenue United. He later played with the Burnaby Selects and Mountain United FC, and was also a part of the British Columbia provincial program. In 2013, he had a training stint with the Italian club Cremonese's youth teams. In 2014, he had a two month trial with the AC Milan Academy and was invited to remain with the academy, but his family was not ready to make the move to Italy permanently. In August 2015, he joined the Vancouver Whitecaps Academy. In May 2021, he was loaned to Italian club Venezia FC's youth teams through June 2022, which included a purchase option. With Venezia's Primavera team, he scored nine goals in 23 appearances across all competitions, including 22 starts.

== Club career ==
In February 2020, at age 17, he signed a homegrown player contract with Vancouver Whitecaps FC in Major League Soccer. He made his debut for the club, in a substitute appearance, against Los Angeles FC on November 8, 2020.

While on loan to Italian club Venezia's youth team, he made the bench for the first team for a Serie A match against Inter Milan in January 2022. In July 2022, Venezia signed Pecile on a permanent contract, after he had been on loan with the club's youth sides for the previous season. He made his first team debut on August 7, 2022, starting in a Coppa Italia match against Ascoli in a 3–2 victory.

In February 2023, he was sent on loan to Finnish club KTP in the Veikkausliiga through December 2023. On May 17, 2023, he score two goals in a 14–0 victory over fourth tier side MyPa in the 2023 Finnish Cup.

On February 1, 2024, Pecile was loaned to Vis Pesaro in Serie C. He made his first and only appearance for the club on March 17, 2024 in a 2-1 defeat against Arezzo, coming into the match as a late substitute. On August 28, 2024, Pecile's contract with Venezia was terminated by mutual consent.

On February 4, 2025, Pecile signed a contract with S.C. Covilhã in Portugal's Liga 3.

In February 2026, he signed with Canadian Premier League club Vancouver FC for the 2026 season, with options for 2027 and 2028.

== International career ==
Pecile is an Italian and Canadian citizen.

In 2014, he represented Canada at the U12 Danone Cup. In November 2016, he made his debut in the Canadian national program, attending an identification camp for the Canada U15 team. In 2019, he played with the Canada under-17 at the 2019 CONCACAF U-17 Championship and the 2019 FIFA U-17 World Cup.

== Style of play ==
Pecile has been described as a box-to-box midfielder, as he has shown versatility, a high work-rate, notable technical skills and good athleticism. Mainly used in a defensive role, he is also able to operate as a center-back, a holding playmaker or a mezzala, while his offensive abilities allow him to provide team-mates with assists or finish by himself.

== Career statistics ==
As of April 20, 2024

Club	Season	League			Playoffs		National Cup		League Cup		Total	
Club	Season	Division	Apps	Goals	Apps	Goals	Apps	Goals	Apps	Goals	Apps	Goals
Vancouver Whitecaps FC	2020	MLS	1	0	—		—		—		1	0
Vancouver Whitecaps FC	2021	MLS	0	0	0	0	0	0	—		0	0
Vancouver Whitecaps FC	Total		1	0	0	0	0	0	—		1	0
Venezia FC (loan)	2021–22	Serie A	0	0	—		0	0	—		0	0
Venezia FC	2022–23	Serie B	0	0	—		1	0	—		1	0
KTP (loan)	2023	Veikkausliiga	14	0	—		3	2	3	0	20	2
Vis Pesaro (loan)	2023–24	Serie C	1	0	—		0	0	0	0	1	0
Career total			16	0	0	0	4	2	3	0	23	2
