= Déiber Caicedo =

Colombian footballer (born 2000)

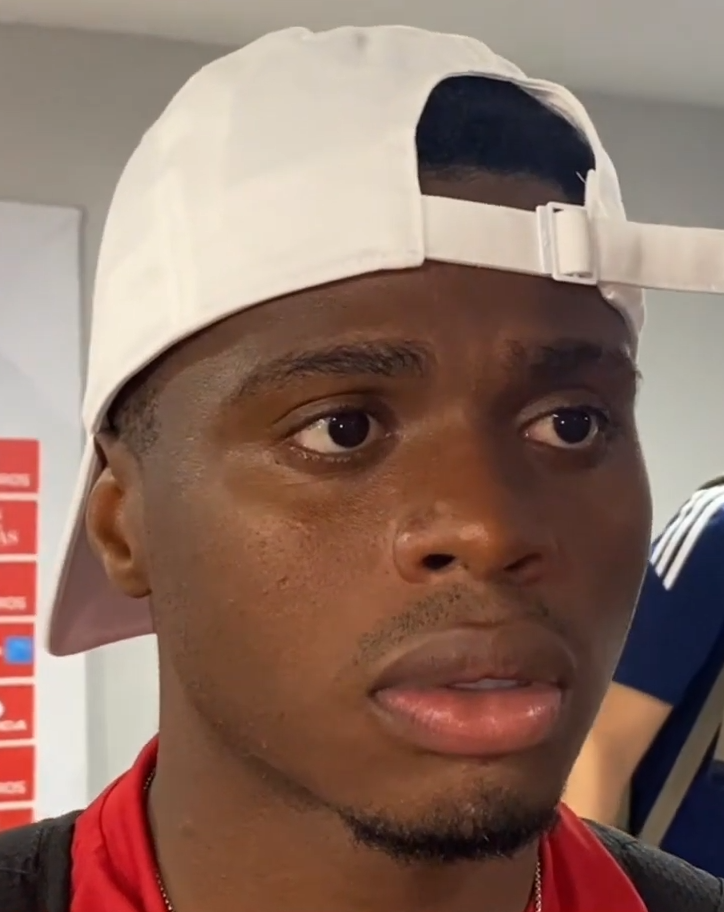
- Caicedo in 2025

Personal information
- Full name: Déiber Jair Caicedo Mideros
- Date of birth: 25 March 2000 (age 26)
- Place of birth: Barbacoas, Nariño, Colombia
- Height: 1.65 m (5 ft 5 in)
- Position: Winger

Team information
- Current team: Atlético Junior
- Number: 20

Youth career
- Sanín
- Pance
- 2013–2018: Deportivo Cali

Senior career*
Years	Team	Apps	(Gls)
2018–2021	Deportivo Cali	78	(8)
2021–2025	Vancouver Whitecaps FC	75	(6)
2023	Whitecaps FC 2	1	(1)
2023–2024	→ Atlético Junior (loan)	42	(8)
2025–	Atlético Junior	11	(0)

International career^{‡}
- Colombia U15
2017	Colombia U17	3	(1)
2019	Colombia U20	2	(1)
- * Club domestic league appearances and goals as of 15 May 2025 ‡ National team caps and goals as of 21 August 2020

Déiber Jair Caicedo Mideros (born 25 March 2000) is a Colombian professional footballer who plays as a winger for Categoría Primera A side Atlético Junior.

== Club career ==
=== Early career ===
Born in Barbacoas in the Nariño Department of Colombia, Caicedo moved to Cali to pursue a football career, playing for local sides Sanín and Pance. During his youth, he also represented the Valle del Cauca Department.

=== Deportivo Cali ===
Caicedo joined the academy of professional side Deportivo Cali in 2013. In a May 2023 interview with Caracol Televisión, Caicedo stated that the academy was very competitive, and due to his height he had to adapt to stand out, but that the experience ultimately made him a better footballer.

On 3 February 2018, Caicedo was given his debut by first-team manager Gerardo Pelusso, when he came on as a second-half substitute for Fabián Sambueza in a 0–0 Categoría Primera A draw with Envigado. On his third start for the club, he scored the second goal in a 4–0 win against Boyacá Chicó; after asking teammate Jhon Mosquera to take a free kick just outside the penalty area, he lifted the ball over the wall and beyond Boyacá Chicó goalkeeper Sérgio Avellaneda. He dedicated the goal to his sister, María José, who had died at the age of eleven in a robbery.

=== Vancouver Whitecaps ===
Following a good start to his career with Deportivo Cali, he was linked to Mexican sides Club América and Atlas in mid-2020. Despite the links, he remained with Deportivo Cali until the conclusion of the 2020 season. On January 26, 2021, Canadian side Vancouver Whitecaps acquired Caicedo from Deportivo Cali, the club announced they acquired his discovery rights from Nashville SC for $75,000 General Allocation Money. It was also announced that Caicedo signed a contract with Vancouver through 2023 with a club option for 2024.

His maiden season in the MLS ended with five goals and five assists, and he received some criticism from fans for his decision to move to Canada. Caicedo himself said that he was "adapting day by day", and though the tactics in the MLS were "very different formations are used to those in Colombia", he did not "regret having made this decision [to move to Canada], as it had "has made [him] grow". A serious injury suffered in the 2022 season ruled him out for eight months; having notched a goal and two assists in his first fifteen games, he tore the meniscus in his right knee in a match against the New England Revolution on 27 June 2022. On 8 July, the Vancouver Whitecaps confirmed that Caicedo would undergo surgery, and he was placed on the MLS disabled list.

He returned to the Vancouver Whitecaps first team for the 2023 season, but due to the form of forwards Simon Becher and Brian White, as well as new signing Sergio Córdova, Caicedo found himself struggling for starts, mostly featuring as a substitute. He was added to the roster of Whitecaps FC 2, and scored on his debut for the side in a 5–2 MLS Next Pro win against Minnesota United FC 2.

==== Loan to Atlético Junior ====
On 3 August 2023, Caicedo signed a new contract with the Vancouver Whitecaps, through 2024 with an option for a further year, before being loaned to Categoría Primera A side Atlético Junior on a one-year deal with a purchase option.

==== Back at the Vancouver Whitecaps ====
On 31 July 2024, Caicedo returned to the Vancouver Whitecaps after his loan spell at Atlético Junior.

== International career ==
Caicedo represented Colombia at the 2017 FIFA U-17 World Cup, scoring in a 3–1 victory against the United States. He was called up for the 2019 FIFA U-20 World Cup, stating that he wanted to "demonstrate all [his] abilities".

== Style of play ==
Standing at 1.65 metres, Caicedo was given the nickname La Nigua (the chigger) by commentator Giovanni Tolozza, due to his short stature, speed and ability to 'sting' defences.

== Career statistics ==
As of 15 July 2023

Appearances and goals by club, season and competition
Club	Season	League			Cup (Note: Includes Copa Colombia and U.S. Open Cup)		Continental (Note: Includes Copa Sudamericana and CONCACAF Champions Cup)		Total	
Club	Season	Division	Apps	Goals	Apps	Goals	Apps	Goals	Apps	Goals
Deportivo Cali	2018	Categoría Primera A	12	1	0	0	0	0	12	1
Deportivo Cali	2019	Categoría Primera A	34	3	7	0	0	0	41	3
Deportivo Cali	2020	Categoría Primera A	19	3	0	0	6	0	25	3
Deportivo Cali	Total		65	7	7	0	6	0	78	7
Vancouver Whitecaps FC	2021	Major League Soccer	33	5	1	0	0	0	34	5
Vancouver Whitecaps FC	2022	Major League Soccer	16	1	3	0	0	0	19	1
Vancouver Whitecaps FC	2023	Major League Soccer	15	0	3	0	1	0	19	0
Vancouver Whitecaps FC	Total		65	7	7	0	1	0	73	7
Whitecaps FC 2	2023	MLS Next Pro	1	1	0	0	–		1	1
Atlético Junior (loan)	2023	Categoría Primera A	1	0	0	0	0	0	1	0
Career total			131	14	14	0	7	0	152	14

== Honours ==
Vancouver Whitecaps FC

- Canadian Championship: 2022, 2023

Individual

- Vancouver Whitecaps FC Most Promising Male Player: 2021
