= Gianfranco Facchineri =

Canadian soccer player

Personal information
- Date of birth: April 27, 2002 (age 24)
- Place of birth: Windsor, Ontario, Canada
- Height: 1.83 m (6 ft 0 in)
- Position: Centre-back

Team information
- Current team: Galway United
- Number: 12

Youth career
- Windsor Ciociaro SC
- Windsor FC Nationals
- Vardar SC
- 2018–2020: Vancouver Whitecaps FC
- 2022: Tecumseh SC

College career
Years	Team	Apps	(Gls)
2022–2023	Windsor Lancers	21	(7)

Senior career*
Years	Team	Apps	(Gls)
2020–2022	Vancouver Whitecaps FC	0	(0)
2020	→ Atlético Ottawa (loan)	5	(0)
2021	→ San Diego Loyal (loan)	6	(0)
2023	Windsor City FC	15	(2)
2024–2025	Valour FC	47	(2)
2026–	Galway United	32	(0)

International career^{‡}
2019	Canada U17	7	(0)
- * Club domestic league appearances and goals as of October 30, 2026 ‡ National team caps and goals as of August 19, 2020

Gianfranco Facchineri (born April 27, 2002), also known as Frankie Facchineri, is a Canadian soccer player who plays for League of Ireland Premier Division club Galway United.

== Early life ==
Facchineri was born and raised in Windsor, Ontario to an Italian family. He played youth soccer with Windsor Ciociaro SC at age five. He later played with the Windsor FC Nationals and Vardar SC. He played with the Ontario provincial team at U14 and U15 levels. In 2016, he was invited to join the Vancouver Whitecaps Academy, but declined the opportunity as he felt he was too young. Two years later in August 2018, he then joined the Vancouver Whitecaps Academy. He began playing with the Whitecaps U17 and U19 sides, before moving to their development side in 2019. In August 2019, he began training with the Whitecaps first team. In 2019, he was the Whitecaps FC BMO RESP Academy Male Player award recipient.

== University career ==
In 2022, he began attending the University of Windsor, where he played for the Windsor Lancers men's soccer team. He scored his first goal on 18 September 2022 against the McMaster Marauders. (His father had previously played for the Lancers as well). On 25 September 2022, he scored two goals in a 9-0 victory over the Algoma Thunderbirds to help Windsor win their first game of the season. In 2023, he was named an OUA West First Team All-Star.

== Club career ==
In January 2020, Facchineri signed a first-team Homegrown Player contract with the Whitecaps. In July 2020, he was loaned to Atlético Ottawa in the Canadian Premier League. He made his professional debut on August 19, 2020, against Valour FC. In August 2021, he was loaned to USL Championship side San Diego Loyal SC. In February 2022, he was released by the Whitecaps, with the club buying out the remainder of his contract.

In 2022, he played in the League1 Ontario Reserve Division with Tecumseh SC U21. In March 2023, he joined Windsor City FC in the League1 Ontario Premier Division. He was named the L1O Defender of the Year and a First Team All-Star in 2023.

In December 2023, he was selected in the second round (ninth overall) of the 2024 CPL–U Sports Draft by Valour FC. In April 2024, he signed a U Sports contract with the club, allowing him to maintain his university eligibility. On July 21, 2024, he scored his first professional goal in a match against Atlético Ottawa. In August 2024, he extended his U Sports contract through the remainder of the season, rather than to return to university. During the 2024 season, he was named to the CPL Team of the Week on two occasions. In December 2024, he signed a two-year professional contract with the club through 2026.

In December 2025, he followed Valour teammate Kris Twardek in signing for League of Ireland Premier Division club Galway United ahead of the 2026 season.

== International career ==
He made his debut in the Canadian youth program in 2016, at the age of 13, attending a U15 identification camp. In 2019, he was named to the Canadian U17 team for the 2019 CONCACAF U-17 Championship, where he served as team captain. On 12 May, he scored the winning penalty kick in the shootout during the quarter-finals against Costa Rica U17, to earn Canada qualification for the 2019 FIFA U-17 World Cup, for which he was also named to the squad for. Across, the two tournaments, he played every minute for the team in their seven matches.

== Career statistics ==
As of October 30, 2026

Club	Season	League			National Cup (Note: Includes Canadian Championship, U.S. Open Cup & FAI Cup)		Other		Total	
Club	Season	Division	Apps	Goals	Apps	Goals	Apps	Goals	Apps	Goals
Vancouver Whitecaps FC	2020	Major League Soccer	0	0	–		–		0	0
Vancouver Whitecaps FC	2021	Major League Soccer	0	0	0	0	0	0	0	0
Vancouver Whitecaps FC	Total		0	0	0	0	0	0	0	0
Atlético Ottawa (loan)	2020	Canadian Premier League	5	0	–		–		5	0
San Diego Loyal SC (loan)	2021	USL Championship	6	0	–		0	0	6	0
Windsor City FC	2023	League1 Ontario	15	2	–		–		15	2
Valour FC	2024	Canadian Premier League	26	1	0	0	–		26	1
Valour FC	2025	Canadian Premier League	21	1	2	0	–		23	1
Valour FC	Total		47	2	2	0	–		49	2
Galway United	2026	LOI Premier Division	32	0	3	0	–		35	0
Career total			105	4	5	0	0	0	110	4
