= Michael Baldisimo =

Filipino-Canadian footballer (born 2000)

Personal information
- Full name: Michael Robert Otucan Baldisimo
- Date of birth: April 13, 2000 (age 26)
- Place of birth: Vancouver, British Columbia, Canada
- Height: 1.68 m (5 ft 6 in)
- Position: Defensive midfielder

Team information
- Current team: Cavalry FC
- Number: 55

Youth career
- Wesburn YSC
- South Burnaby Metro Club
- Mountain United
- Burnaby Metro Selects SC
- 2011–2018: Vancouver Whitecaps FC

Senior career*
Years	Team	Apps	(Gls)
2016–2017	Whitecaps FC 2	13	(0)
2018–2022	Vancouver Whitecaps FC	47	(1)
2022	→ Whitecaps FC 2 (loan)	2	(0)
2023–2024	San Jose Earthquakes	12	(0)
2023–2024	→ The Town FC (Note: San Jose Earthquakes II changed their name to The Town FC in 2024) (loan)	3	(0)
2025	Cavalry FC U21	1	(0)
2025–	Cavalry FC	31	(1)

International career^{‡}
2017	Canada U17	1	(0)
2018	Canada U20	3	(0)
2018	Canada U21	1	(0)
2021	Canada U23	4	(0)
2024–	Philippines	10	(0)
2026	Philippines U23	3	(0)
- * Club domestic league appearances and goals as of October 25, 2026 ‡ National team caps and goals as of September 22, 2026

Michael Robert Otucan Baldisimo (born 13 April 2000) is a professional footballer who plays as a defensive midfielder for Canadian Premier League club Cavalry FC. Born in Canada, he plays for the Philippines national team.

== Early life ==
Baldisimo began playing soccer at age four with Wesburn Youth SC. Afterwards, he played with South Burnaby Metro Club, Mountain United, and Burnaby Metro Selects SC. In 2011, he represented Western Canada at the Danone Cup qualifiers. Later in 2011, he joined the Vancouver Whitecaps Academy. He was named the 2018 Whitecaps 'Most Promising Player' at the club's annual awards ceremony.

== Club career ==
On August 4, 2016, he made his professional debut in the USL with Whitecaps FC 2 as an academy call-up in a match against Arizona United SC. He attended the 2017 pre-season with the Vancouver Whitecaps FC first team. In March 2017, he signed a professional contract with Whitecaps FC 2 in the USL Championship.

In July 2018, Baldisimo signed a homegrown player contract with Vancouver Whitecaps FC in Major League Soccer. After not featuring for the team in 2018 or 2019, he began to feature regularly with the team in 2020. He made his debut for the first team on August 25, 2020, starting in a 2–0 away defeat to the Montreal Impact. He scored his first goal the following week on September 5, in a 3–2 home victory over Toronto FC.

After the 2022 season, following the expiry of his contract, he was selected by the San Jose Earthquakes in the 2022 MLS Re-Entry Draft. In January 2023, he signed a one-year contract with a club option for 2024 with the Earthquakes.

=== Cavalry FC ===
In April 2025, Baldisimo signed with Canadian Premier League club Cavalry FC for 2025, with a club option for 2026. He scored his first goal on August 17, 2025, in a 5–4 victory over Vancouver FC. In January 2026, Baldisimo would sign a contract extension for the 2026 season, with club options for 2027 and 2028.

== International career ==
Baldisimo was born in Canada and is of Filipino descent.

=== Canada ===
In October 2014, he made his debut in the Canadian program when he was called up to a camp with the Canada U15 national team. In the summer of 2015, he was named to the U15 squad for a tournament in Mexico. In 2017, he was named to the Canada U17 team for the 2017 CONCACAF U-17 Championship. He was called up to the Canada U21 team for the 2018 Toulon Tournament and also made three starts for the Canada U20 team at the 2018 CONCACAF U-20 Championship, recording an assist against Dominica U20. In March 2021, Baldisimo was named to the Canadian U23 squad for the 2020 CONCACAF Men's Olympic Qualifying Championship. In June 2021, he was named to the 60-man provisional squad for the 2021 CONCACAF Gold Cup, but was left off the final team.

=== Philippines ===
In May 2021, Baldisimo received an invitation to play for the Philippines senior national team in their 2022 FIFA World Cup Asian qualifiers, however he declined the offer as he was still expecting to receive a call up from the Canadian senior team. In November 2021, he accepted a call-up to the Philippines for the rescheduled 2020 AFF Championship tournament, but had to withdraw due to injury. He accepted another invite to train with the team in November 2022.

In March 2024, Baldisimo was called up to the team for two 2026 FIFA World Cup qualification matches against Iraq.

== Personal life ==
Michael is the younger brother of Matthew Baldisimo, who is also a professional soccer player.

== Career statistics ==
As of November 21, 2026

Club	Season	League			Playoffs		National cup		Continental		Total	
Club	Season	Division	Apps	Goals	Apps	Goals	Apps	Goals	Apps	Goals	Apps	Goals
Whitecaps FC 2	2016	USL	1	0	0	0	—		—		1	0
Whitecaps FC 2	2017	USL	12	0	—		—		—		12	0
Whitecaps FC 2	Total		13	0	0	0	0	0	0	0	13	0
Vancouver Whitecaps FC	2020	MLS	13	1	—		—		—		13	1
Vancouver Whitecaps FC	2021	MLS	21	0	0	0	0	0	—		21	0
Vancouver Whitecaps FC	2022	MLS	13	0	—		3	0	—		15	0
Vancouver Whitecaps FC	Total		47	1	0	0	3	0	0	0	50	1
Whitecaps FC 2 (loan)	2022	MLS Next Pro	2	0	—		—		—		2	0
San Jose Earthquakes	2023	MLS	10	0	0	0	1	0	—		11	0
San Jose Earthquakes	2024	MLS	1	0	0	0	0	0	—		1	0
San Jose Earthquakes	Total		11	0	0	0	1	0	0	0	12	0
San Jose Earthquakes II	2023	MLS Next Pro	2	0	0	0	—		—		2	0
Cavalry FC U21	2025	League1 Alberta	1	0	0	0	0	0	0	0	1	0
Cavalry FC	2025	Canadian Premier League	15	1	2	0	0	0	0	0	17	1
Cavalry FC	2026	Canadian Premier League	16	0	3	0	3	1	0	0	22	1
Cavalry FC	Total		31	1	5	0	3	1	0	0	39	2
Career total			106	2	5	0	7	1	0	0	118	3

== Honours ==
Vancouver Whitecaps FC

- Canadian Championship: 2022
