= Thomas Hasal =

Canadian soccer player (born 1999)

- Hasal with Los Angeles FC in 2026

Personal information
- Date of birth: July 9, 1999 (age 27)
- Place of birth: Cambridge, Ontario, Canada
- Height: 1.90 m (6 ft 3 in)
- Position: Goalkeeper

Team information
- Current team: Los Angeles FC
- Number: 12

Youth career
- 2012: Aurora SC (Saskatchewan)
- 2013–2016: Whitecaps Saskatchewan Academy
- 2016–2018: Vancouver Whitecaps FC

Senior career*
Years	Team	Apps	(Gls)
2019–2023	Vancouver Whitecaps FC	34	(0)
2022–2023	Whitecaps FC 2	7	(0)
2024–	Los Angeles FC	6	(0)
2024–	Los Angeles FC 2	10	(0)

International career^{‡}
2016	Canada U18	1	(0)
2017–2018	Canada U20	5	(0)
- * Club domestic league appearances and goals as of May 24, 2026 ‡ National team caps and goals as of February 18, 2020

Thomas Hasal (born July 9, 1999) is a Canadian professional soccer player who plays as a goalkeeper for Major League Soccer club Los Angeles FC.

== Early life ==
Born in Cambridge, Ontario, Hasal moved with his family to Ottawa when he was a year old, where he began playing soccer at age five. He then moved to Calgary at age seven, Edmonton at age eight, and Saskatoon at age nine. He played with youth club Aurora SC in Saskatchewan for a year, later joining the Whitecaps FC Saskatchewan Academy Centre in 2013, and also played for the Saskatchewan provincial team in 2014 and 2015. In August 2016, he joined the Whitecaps Residency Academy and later joined the Vancouver Whitecaps FC U-23 developmental squad in 2018. In 2016, he led the U19 team to the Academy Championship semi-finals. In 2016 and 2017, he was named the Saskatchewan Soccer Association Male Youth Player of the Year.

== Club career ==
=== Vancouver Whitecaps FC ===
In March 2019, he signed a professional contract with Vancouver Whitecaps FC of Major League Soccer as a homegrown player through 2020, with club options for 2021 and 2022. Initially serving as the third-string goalkeeper, he made his debut on July 19, 2020, coming on as a substitute against the Seattle Sounders FC, early in the second half of an MLS is Back Tournament group stage match after an injury to Maxime Crépeau. He made his first start in the next match on July 23, keeping a clean sheet in a 2–0 victory. He led the team to the Round of 16, where they were defeated in penalty kicks by Sporting Kansas City, following a 0–0 draw, with Hasal finishing the tournament with no goals against in regulation. Despite the loss, he was named Man of the Match and was selected to the MLS Team of the Week. After the tournament, he was named a finalist for the MLS is Back Tournament Golden Glove, Best XI, and Save of the Tournament. Hasal would take over the starting role in Crépeau's absence, but would lose that role after suffering a fractured tibia and concussion, in September 2020. Following the return of Crépeau, Hasal began the 2021 season in a backup role.

In 2022, he extended his contract through the 2023 season, with club options for 2024 and 2025. Following the trade of starter Maxime Crépeau, Hasal began the 2022 season as the Whitecaps' first-choice goalkeeper. However, on May 8, he suffered a fractured finger, putting him out of action. On June 25, he joined the second team Whitecaps FC 2 in MLS Next Pro in their match against San Jose Earthquakes II in his first game back. After the 2023 season, Hasal's contract option for the 2024 season would be declined by the Whitecaps, ending his time with the club.

=== Los Angeles FC ===
On June 5, 2024, Hasal signed with Los Angeles FC through 2025 with an option for 2026.

== International career ==
Hasal made his debut in the Canadian youth program in October 2016 when he was called up to the Canada U18 team. In 2017, he was called up to the Canadian U20 team for a pair of friendly tournaments in January 2017, where he saved a penalty against El Salvador. He was then named to the roster for the 2017 CONCACAF U-20 Championship. At the CONCACAF Championship, he played every minute in Canada's three matches. He was then named to the roster for the 2018 CONCACAF U-20 Championship. In January 2020, Hasal was named to a camp with the Canada U23 team, before being named to the provisional roster for the 2020 CONCACAF Men's Olympic Qualifying Championship on February 26, 2020.

In November 2022, he was called up to the Canada senior team for the first time, ahead of a friendly against Bahrain, although he did not appear in the match.

== Personal life ==
Hasal is of Czech descent; both his parents are first-generation emigrants from the Czech Republic. His grandfather František was a goalkeeper and introduced Hasal to soccer.

== Career statistics ==
As of August 5, 2026

Club	Season	League			Playoffs		National cup		Continental		Other		Total	
Club	Season	Division	Apps	Goals	Apps	Goals	Apps	Goals	Apps	Goals	Apps	Goals	Apps	Goals
Vancouver Whitecaps FC	2020	MLS	9	0	—		—		—		1 (Note: Knockout round of the MLS is Back Tournament.)	0	10	0
Vancouver Whitecaps FC	2021	MLS	7	0	0	0	0	0	—		—		7	0
Vancouver Whitecaps FC	2022	MLS	17	0	—		0	0	—		—		17	0
Vancouver Whitecaps FC	2023	MLS	1	0	0	0	0	0	2	0	—		3	0
Vancouver Whitecaps FC	Total		34	0	0	0	0	0	2	0	1	0	37	0
Whitecaps FC 2	2022	MLS Next Pro	3	0	—		—		—		—		3	0
Whitecaps FC 2	2023	MLS Next Pro	4	0	—		—		—		—		4	0
Whitecaps FC 2	Total		7	0	0	0	0	0	0	0	0	0	7	0
Los Angeles FC	2024	MLS	1	0	0	0	0	0	0	0	0	0	1	0
Los Angeles FC	2025	MLS	2	0	0	0	0	0	0	0	2	0	4	0
Los Angeles FC	2026	MLS	3	0	0	0	0	0	1	0	1	0	5	0
Los Angeles FC	Total		6	0	0	0	0	0	1	0	3	0	10	0
Los Angeles FC 2	2024	MLS Next Pro	3	0	0	0	0	0	0	0	0	0	3	0
Los Angeles FC 2	2025	MLS Next Pro	6	0	0	0	0	0	0	0	0	0	6	0
Los Angeles FC 2	2026	MLS Next Pro	1	0	0	0	0	0	0	0	0	0	1	0
Los Angeles FC 2	Total		10	0	0	0	0	0	0	0	0	0	10	0
Career total			57	0	0	0	0	0	3	0	4	0	64	0

== Honours ==
Vancouver Whitecaps FC

- Canadian Championship: 2023
