= David Milinković =

French footballer (born 1994)

Personal information
- Full name: Manuel David Milinković
- Date of birth: 20 May 1994 (age 32)
- Place of birth: Antibes, France
- Height: 1.80 m (5 ft 11 in)
- Position: Winger

Youth career
- 2010–2011: Cannes
- 2012: Red Star Belgrade

Senior career*
Years	Team	Apps	(Gls)
2013	Rad	0	(0)
2013	→ BASK (loan)		
2013–2014	BASK		
2015	Ternana	3	(0)
2015	Salernitana	9	(0)
2016–2018	Genoa	0	(0)
2016	→ Virtus Lanciano (loan)	7	(0)
2016–2017	→ Messina (loan)	34	(7)
2017	→ Foggia (loan)	0	(0)
2017–2018	→ Heart of Midlothian (loan)	24	(6)
2018–2021	Hull City	8	(0)
2020–2021	→ Vancouver Whitecaps FC (loan)	16	(1)
2021	Vancouver Whitecaps FC	0	(0)
2021–2022	Messina	3	(0)
- * Club domestic league appearances and goals as of 22 December 2021

Manuel David Milinković (Serbian Cyrillic: Мануел Давид Милинковић, pronounced [mǎnuel dǎʋid milǐːŋkoʋitɕ]; born 20 May 1994) is a French professional footballer who plays as a winger.

== Career ==
Born in Antibes, France, Milinković has Serbian origins. His grandfather Mirko came to France from the outskirts of Sarajevo. Already in France, David's father Igor was born. He worked at Partus Corporation, a company dedicated to casinos, hotels, thermal centers, restaurants, and so on. Mirko's grandson, Igor's son, David, started playing football in the youth team of Cannes.

During the winter transfer window of the 2011–12 season he moved to Serbia and joined the youth team of Red Star Belgrade. He then joined Rad, who loaned him to third level side BASK in the 2012–13 winter-break. In summer 2013 he joined BASK permanently and played with them until the winter-break of the 2014–15 season.

Then he moved to Italy, where, after a short time spent in Troma, he joined Ternana, playing with them in the second half of the 2014–15 Serie B season. In summer 2015, he joined another Serie B side, Salernitana.

In the winter-break of the 2015–16 season, he signed with Genoa which immediately loaned him to Serie B side Virtus Lanciano where he played the second half of the 2015–16 Serie B. In summer 2016, Genoa loaned him to Messina playing in the Lega Pro, before signing a season long-loan with the Scottish side Heart of Midlothian in 2017.

On 9 July 2018, he signed a three-year deal, with an option for an additional year, with English side Hull City. He made his debut in the first match of the 2018–19 season on 6 August 2018 at home to Aston Villa, coming off the bench as a 67th-minute substitute for Todd Kane, in a 3–1 defeat.

He was acquired on a one-year loan, with an option to buy, by Canadian Major League Soccer side Vancouver Whitecaps FC on 27 January 2020, for their 2020 season. On 1 February 2021, the loan was made permanent with the triggering of a clause in his loan contract. However, on 2 February 2021, it was announced that Milinković and the Whitecaps FC mutually agreed to part ways.

On 31 August 2021, he returned to Italy and Messina, signing a two-year deal.

== Career statistics ==
As of 14 October 2020

Appearances and goals by club, season and competition
Club	Season	League			National cup		League cup		Other		Total	
Club	Season	Division	Apps	Goals	Apps	Goals	Apps	Goals	Apps	Goals	Apps	Goals
Ternana	2014–15	Serie B	3	0	0	0	—		0	0	3	0
Salernitana	2015–16	Serie B	9	0	1	0	—		0	0	10	0
Genoa	2015–16	Serie A	0	0	0	0	—		0	0	0	0
Virtus Lanciano (loan)	2015–16	Serie B	7	0	0	0	—		0	0	7	0
Messina (loan)	2016–17	Serie C	34	7	2	0	—		0	0	36	7
Foggia (loan)	2017–18	Serie B	0	0	2	1	—		0	0	2	1
Heart of Midlothian (loan)	2017–18	Scottish Premiership	24	6	2	0	—		0	0	26	6
Hull City	2018–19	Championship	8	0	1	0	2	0	0	0	11	0
Hull City	2019–20	Championship	0	0	0	0	1	1	0	0	1	1
Hull City	Total		8	0	1	0	3	1	0	0	12	1
Whitecaps (loan)	2020	Major League Soccer	16	1	0	0	0	0	0	0	16	1
Career total			101	14	8	1	3	1	0	0	112	16
