= Simon Colyn =

Canadian soccer player (born 2002)

Personal information
- Date of birth: March 23, 2002 (age 24)
- Place of birth: Langley, British Columbia, Canada
- Height: 1.82 m (6 ft 0 in)
- Position: Midfielder

Team information
- Current team: Lyngby
- Number: 7

Youth career
- Langley United YSA
- –2016: Surrey United SC
- 2016–2018: Vancouver Whitecaps FC

Senior career*
Years	Team	Apps	(Gls)
2018–2022	Vancouver Whitecaps FC	1	(0)
2020–2021	→ SPAL (loan)	0	(0)
2021–2022	→ Jong PSV (loan)	28	(5)
2022–2023	Jong PSV	37	(6)
2023–2025	De Graafschap	35	(7)
2025–	Lyngby	38	(9)

International career^{‡}
2019	Canada U17	4	(1)
- * Club domestic league appearances and goals as of November 21, 2026 ‡ National team caps and goals as of May 14, 2019

Simon Colyn (born March 23, 2002) is a Canadian professional soccer player who plays as a midfielder for Danish Superliga club Lyngby.

== Career ==
=== Vancouver Whitecaps FC ===
Colyn signed with Vancouver Whitecaps FC on April 19, 2018. He made his debut on Vancouver's final game of the 2018 MLS season on October 28, as a substitute for Alphonso Davies in the 86th minute of a 2–1 victory over the Portland Timbers.

On November 19, 2019, it was announced that Colyn would be joining Dutch club PSV for a 10-day training stint.

On October 7, 2020, Colyn joined Italian Serie B side SPAL on loan until June 2021, with an option for the club to make the deal permanent.

=== Jong PSV ===
On August 27, 2021, Colyn joined Dutch Eerste Divisie side Jong PSV, the reserve team of PSV, on loan until June 2022, with an option to buy. He made his debut on September 13, subbing in for Jong PSV in a 2–1 defeat to Utrecht. He scored his first goal for the club on December 6 against De Graafschap. He signed a permanent deal with the club on July 20, 2022, penning a two-year contract.

=== De Graafschap ===
In August 2023, Eerste Divisie side De Graafschap announced they had transferred Colyn from Jong PSV, with the player signing a two-year contract. He made his debut on August 21 against his previous club Jong PSV, and had an assist on David Flakus Bosilj's goal in a 2-1 victory. Colyn scored his first goal on October 6 against Willem II, netting the second goal for De Graafschap in an eventual 4-2 away defeat.

=== Lyngby ===
On 12 August 2025, Colyn joined Danish side Lygnby on a free transfer, signing a three-year contract.

== International career ==
Colyn was called up to a U-15 youth identification camp for Canada in 2017 under coach Rob Gale. For the CONCACAF Under-17 Championship, Colyn was named the captain for Canada and helped the team qualify for the 2019 FIFA U-17 World Cup.

On February 26, 2024, Colyn was named to the Canada men's national soccer team provisional roster for the 2024 Copa América qualifying play-offs against Trinidad and Tobago.

== Personal life ==
Colyn is of Dutch descent through his parents, and holds a dual-citizenship with Canada and the Netherlands.

== Career statistics ==
=== Club ===
As of October 25, 2026

Club	League	Season	League		Cup		Playoffs		Total	
Club	League	Season	Apps	Goals	Apps	Goals	Apps	Goals	Apps	Goals
Vancouver Whitecaps FC	MLS	2018	1	0	0	0	0	0	1	0
Jong PSV (loan)	Eerste Divisie	2021–22	28	5	0	0	0	0	28	5
Jong PSV	Eerste Divisie	2022–23	36	6	0	0	0	0	36	6
Jong PSV	Eerste Divisie	2023–24	1	0	0	0	0	0	1	0
Jong PSV	Total		65	11	0	0	0	0	65	11
De Graafschap	Eerste Divisie	2023–24	33	7	2	1	0	0	35	8
De Graafschap	Eerste Divisie	2024–25	2	0	0	0	1	0	3	0
De Graafschap	Total		35	7	2	1	1	0	38	8
Lyngby	1st Division	2025–26	25	3	2	0	0	0	27	3
Lyngby	Superliga	2026–27	11	5	2	1	0	0	13	6
Lyngby	Total		36	8	4	1	0	0	40	9
Career total			137	26	6	2	1	0	144	28

== Honors ==
Lyngby

- Danish 1st Division: 2025–26
