= Érik Godoy =

Argentine footballer

Personal information
- Full name: Érik Fernando Godoy
- Date of birth: 16 August 1993 (age 33)
- Place of birth: Buenos Aires, Argentina
- Height: 1.85 m (6 ft 1 in)
- Position: Defender

Team information
- Current team: Argentinos Juniors
- Number: 4

Senior career*
Years	Team	Apps	(Gls)
2012–2018	Tigre	113	(4)
2017–2018	→ Belgrano (loan)	25	(1)
2018–2020	Colón	11	(0)
2019	→ Vancouver Whitecaps FC (loan)	29	(1)
2020–2022	Vancouver Whitecaps FC	35	(2)
2022	Whitecaps FC 2	2	(0)
2023–2024	Belgrano	25	(0)
2024–	Argentinos Juniors	52	(2)
- * Club domestic league appearances and goals as of 17:18, 10 July 2026 (UTC)

Érik Fernando Godoy (born 16 August 1993) is an Argentine professional footballer who plays as a defender for Argentinos Juniors.

== Club career ==
During his time in Argentina, Godoy made over 140 appearances scoring six goals in all competitions. Godoy signed with Vancouver Whitecaps FC on a season-long loan with an option to purchase on 9 February 2019. In the 2019 season, Godoy made 29 appearances and recorded the second-most blocks in MLS history. On 22 January 2019, the purchase option was exercised and Godoy signed permanently with the Whitecaps through 2022, with an option for 2023. On 5 August 2022, Godoy was waived by Vancouver.
