= Cristián Gutiérrez (soccer, born 1997) =

Canadian soccer player

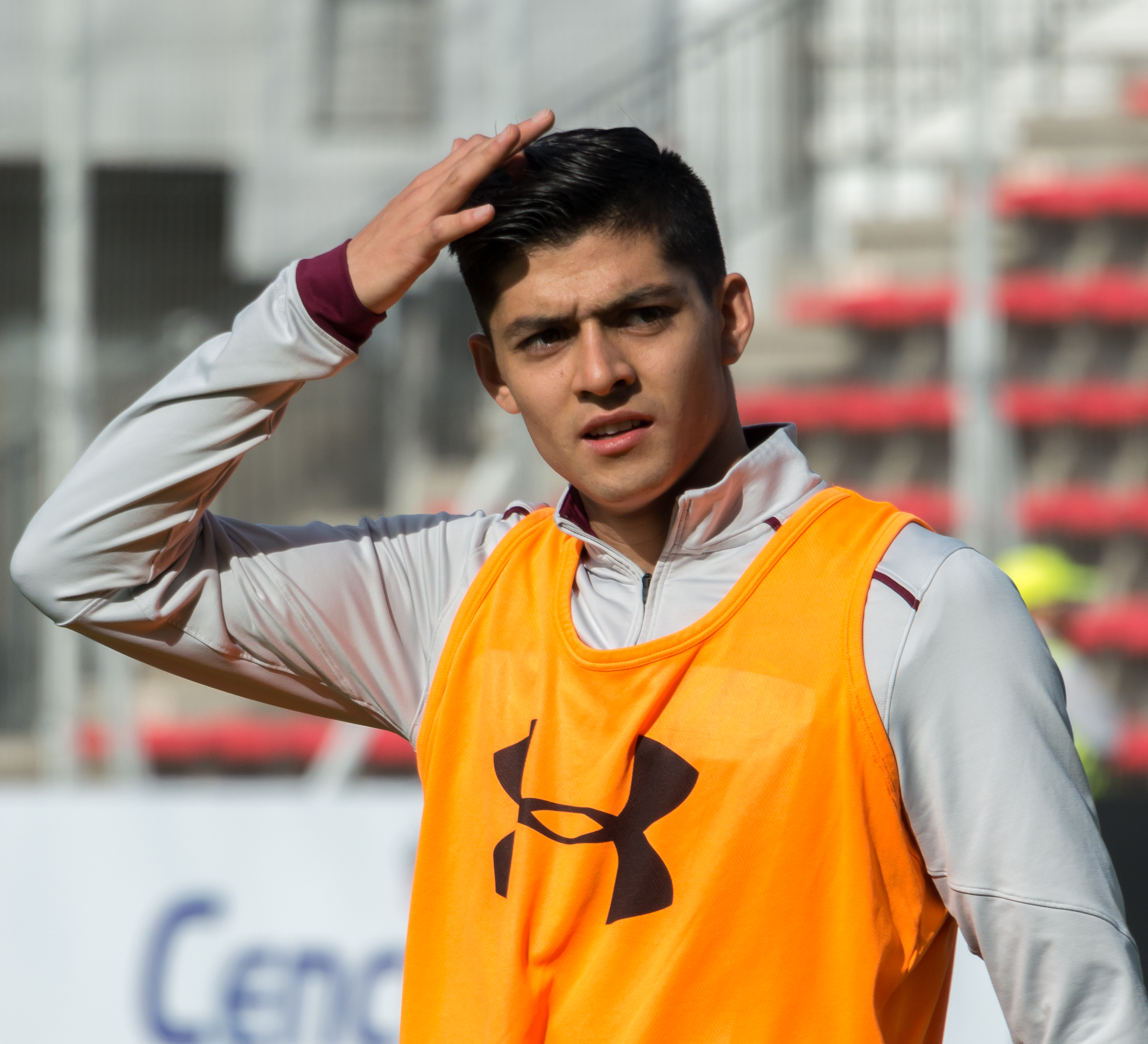
- Gutiérrez with Colo-Colo in 2019

Personal information
- Full name: Cristián Daniel Gutiérrez Zúñiga
- Date of birth: 18 February 1997 (age 29)
- Place of birth: Greenfield Park, Quebec, Canada
- Height: 1.81 m (5 ft 11 in)
- Position: Left-back

Team information
- Current team: Unión La Calera

Youth career
- Colo-Colo

Senior career*
Years	Team	Apps	(Gls)
2013–2014	Colo-Colo B	5	(0)
2015–2019	Colo-Colo	27	(0)
2017	→ Unión Española (loan)	11	(0)
2017–2018	→ Huachipato (loan)	14	(0)
2020–2023	Vancouver Whitecaps FC	42	(0)
2022	→ Whitecaps FC 2 (loan)	3	(0)
2023	Toronto FC	6	(0)
2023	→ Toronto FC II (loan)	3	(0)
2024	Universidad de Concepción	10	(0)
2025	Deportes La Serena	15	(0)
2026–	Unión La Calera	0	(0)

International career^{‡}
2015–2017	Chile U20	7	(0)
- * Club domestic league appearances and goals as of 31 December 2025 ‡ National team caps and goals as of 1 October 2017

Cristián Daniel Gutiérrez Zúñiga (born 18 February 1997) is a professional soccer player who plays as a left-back for Unión La Calera in the Chilean Primera División. Born in Canada, he previously represented Chile at the U20 level, but filed his FIFA one-time switch in 2021 to switch allegiances to Canada.

== Early life ==
Gutiérrez was born in Greenfield Park, Quebec in Canada and moved to Santiago, Chile with his family when he was four. He began playing soccer at age five with the youth system of Colo-Colo. In 2013, he won the U17 title with Colo-Colo.

== Club career ==
He began his senior career with Colo-Colo B in 2013 in the Segunda División Profesional de Chile.

Gutiérrez made his professional debut with Colo-Colo in a 3–1 Copa Chile home win over Deportes Concepción on 1 March 2015. In November 2015, he signed a professional contract with the club through 2019. After being a consistent first team player, he was part of the 2015 Torneo Apertura winning team.

After being demoted back to the Colo-Colo youth teams, in February 2017, he went on loan to fellow Chilean side Unión Española. In August 2017, Gutiérrez was loaned to Huachipato. In March 2019, his loan was terminated early for him to return to Colo-Colo. He departed the club upon the expiry of his contract in December 2019, after not having his contract renewed.

In January 2020, he joined Major League Soccer club Vancouver Whitecaps FC on a two-year contract with an additional two option years. He made his debut during the MLS is Back Tournament on 19 July against Seattle Sounders FC. He became a regular fixture for the club in his first couple of seasons, despite initially arriving as a back up. Between the final matches of the 2020 season and the beginning of the 2021 season, he set the club MLS record for longest assist streak by a defender. With the club, he won the 2022 Canadian Championship.

In March 2023, he was claimed off waivers by Toronto FC. In May 2023, he was loaned to the second team Toronto FC II in MLS Next Pro, where he appeared in their match on May 15 against New England Revolution II, which was his first match action after returning from an illness that kept him out since his arrival to Toronto. He made his first team debut on June 21 against FC Cincinnati.

In March 2024, he returned to Chile and signed with Universidad de Concepción.

In January 2025, he signed with Deportes La Serena in the Chilean Primera División. The next season, he switched to Unión La Calera.

== International career ==
Gutiérrez is eligible to represent both Canada and Chile.

In 2015, he was named to the Chile U20 team for the L'Alcúdia Tournament, helping them win the title. He then subsequently represented the squad at the 2017 South American U-20 Championship.

After previously rejecting calls from the Canada national team, as he had been waiting for additional opportunities with Chile, in 2020, Gutiérrez filed his FIFA one-time switch to switch his representation from Chile to Canada. He was called up to the Canada national team for the first time, for a training camp in January 2021. In March 2021, he was called up ahead of matches in the 2022 FIFA World Cup qualification cycle. After initially being unselected for the 2021 Gold Cup, he was later named as an injury replacement for Alphonso Davies, but would not travel to the Gold Cup and would remain with the MLS club, unless needed by Canada. However, despite regularly being called up for World Cup qualifying, he did not make his debut featuring on the bench six times, and was not ultimately selected to the 2022 FIFA World Cup squad.

== Personal life ==
His twin brother Diego is also a professional soccer player.
