= Jake Nerwinski =

American soccer player (born 1994)

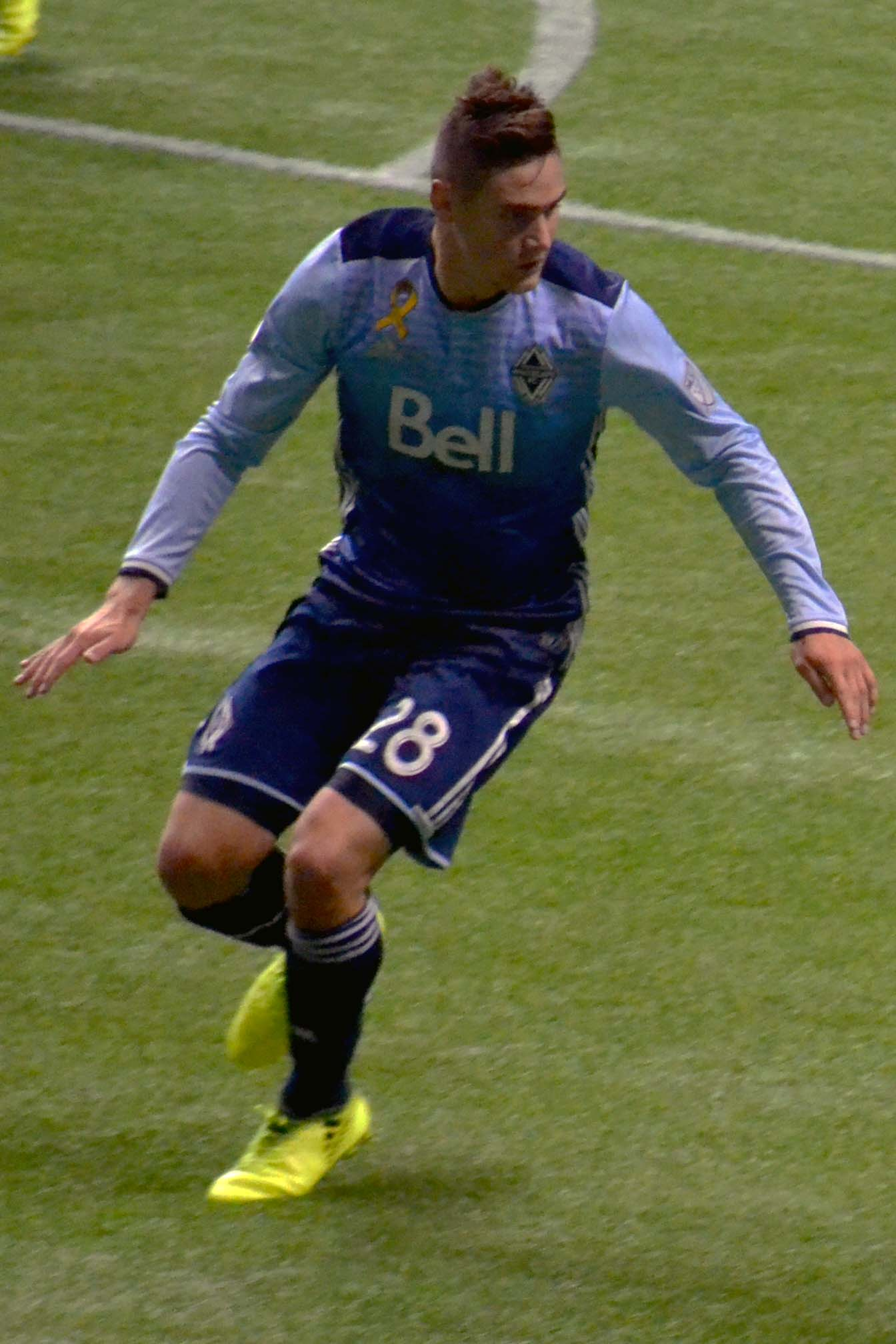
- Nerwinski in 2017

Personal information
- Full name: Jakob Maling Nerwinski
- Date of birth: October 17, 1994 (age 32)
- Place of birth: Lawrenceville, New Jersey, United States
- Height: 6 ft 0 in (1.83 m)
- Position: Right-back

Youth career
- 2005–2013: NJSA 04

College career
Years	Team	Apps	(Gls)
2013–2016	UConn Huskies	81	(5)

Senior career*
Years	Team	Apps	(Gls)
2017–2022	Vancouver Whitecaps FC	159	(4)
2017	→ Whitecaps FC 2 (loan)	2	(0)
2022–2024	St. Louis City SC	45	(1)
2024	St. Louis City 2	2	(0)
- * Club domestic league appearances and goals as of July 28, 2025

Jakob Maling Nerwinski (born October 17, 1994) is an American former professional soccer player who last played as a right-back for St. Louis City SC. He is currently a free-agent.

== Early life ==
A native of the Lawrenceville section of Lawrence Township, Mercer County, New Jersey, Nerwinski played varsity soccer from his freshman through senior year at Notre Dame High School in Lawrenceville under coach Mike Perone. During each of his four years as a varsity starter he earned All-County honors and was named to All-State, All-Area, or All-Conference first teams at least once per season. During his senior season, Nerwinski broke Notre Dame's all-time scoring record with 21 goals and 19 assists.

== Career ==
=== College ===
Nerwinski played four years of college soccer at the University of Connecticut between 2013 and 2016. During his time at UConn, Nerwinski was named in the American Athletic Conference First Team and the NSCAA First Team All-East Region for two consecutive years.

=== Professional ===
On January 13, 2017, Nerwinski was selected 7th overall in the 2017 MLS SuperDraft by Vancouver Whitecaps FC. He signed with the club on February 9, 2017.

Nerwinski made his professional debut on February 22, 2017, in a 1–1 draw with the New York Red Bulls in the CONCACAF Champions League.

Following the 2022 season, Nerwinski's contract option was declined by Vancouver.

Nerwinski signed a two-year deal with St. Louis City SC on November 28, 2022, joining the club in their inaugural season in MLS in 2023. Nerwinski left St.Louis in October 2024 after having his contract option declined by the club following the 2024 season.

== Honors ==
Vancouver Whitecaps

- Canadian Championship: 2022

St. Louis City SC

- Western Conference (regular season): 2023

== Personal life ==
Born in the United States, Nerwinski is of Polish descent through his great-grandparents who arrived to the United States from Warsaw, Poland.
