= Ali Adnan Kadhim =

Iraqi footballer (born 1993)

Ali Adnan
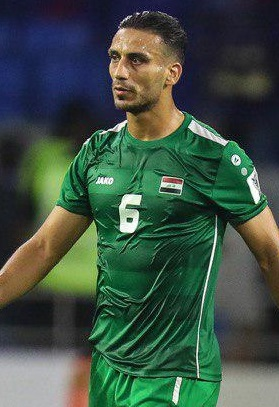
- Adnan playing for Iraq at the 2019 AFC Asian Cup

Personal information
- Full name: Ali Adnan Kadhim Nasser Al-Tameemi
- Date of birth: 19 December 1993 (age 32)
- Place of birth: Baghdad, Iraq
- Height: 1.85 m (6 ft 1 in)
- Position: Left-back

Team information
- Current team: Al-Zawraa
- Number: 53

Youth career
- 2003–2008: Ammo Baba School
- 2008–2009: Al-Zawraa
- 2009–2010: Al-Quwa Al-Jawiya

Senior career*
Years	Team	Apps	(Gls)
2010–2013	Baghdad	62	(7)
2013–2015	Çaykur Rizespor	41	(3)
2015–2019	Udinese	65	(1)
2018–2019	→ Atalanta (loan)	3	(0)
2019	→ Vancouver Whitecaps FC (loan)	16	(1)
2019–2021	Vancouver Whitecaps FC	34	(2)
2021–2022	Vejle	1	(0)
2022–2023	Rubin Kazan	8	(0)
2023–2024	Mes Rafsanjan	21	(0)
2024–2025	Al-Najma	31	(1)
2025–2026	Al Wehda	19	(2)
2026–	Al-Zawraa	10	(0)

International career^{‡}
2011–2013	Iraq U20	15	(4)
2012–2016	Iraq U23	13	(5)
2012–2024	Iraq	97	(7)
Medal record
Men's football
Representing Iraq
Asian Games
Bronze medal – third place	2014 Incheon	Team
AFC U-19 Championship
Runner-up	2012 AFC U-19 Championship	Team
- * Club domestic league appearances and goals as of 8 November 2026 ‡ National team caps and goals as of 8 November 2026

Ali Adnan Kadhim Nasser Al-Tameemi (Arabic: عَلِيّ عَدْنَان كَاظِم نَاصِر التَّمِيمِيّ; born 19 December 1993) is an Iraqi professional footballer who plays as a left-back for Al-Zawraa and the Iraq national team.

Adnan has played at the 2013 FIFA U-20 World Cup, where he was one of Iraq's star players as the underdogs went on to reach the semi-final. He won the 2013 Asian Young Footballer of the Year.

== Club career ==
=== Early years ===
Adnan was graduated from the prestigious Ammo Baba Football School situated opposite the Al-Shaab Stadium, where he spent the early part of his football education. In his five years at the school, and despite being one of the youngest kids at the time, he excelled and progressed from the Baraem ("Buds") and Ashbal ("Cubs") teams. The player sees his time at the school as an important foundation of his career and a key part of his development. He moved from the school, to one of Iraq's top clubs Al-Zawraa – joining one of the best youth set-ups in the country, and also his uncle's former club, playing at Nasha’een (Under 17) level and then the youth team. After spending a season in the youth team at city rivals Al-Quwa Al-Jawiya, he transferred to big spenders Baghdad FC.

=== Baghdad FC ===
There he first played for the Baghdad FC's youth side and was invited to the senior team by head coach Yahya Alwan, at a relatively young age but because of the depth in the squad, he returned to the youth set-up. It was only after Karim Kurdi was appointed head coach of the club in 2010, that Adnan became a regular with the seniors. The coach was able to give the attacking left sided player the confidence in his own abilities and Adnan went from strength to strength, dislodging his idol and teammate, the Iraqi international Bassim Abbas on the left flank, first at club level and then with Iraq. He scored seven goals for Baghdad FC in total. Two were in the 2010–11 season (against Naft Maysan and Al-Hasanain), three were in the 2011–12 season (two against Kirkuk FC and one against Al-Sinaa) and two were in the 2012–13 season (against Al-Minaa and Al-Kahraba).

During the 2013 winter transfer window, the player received an offer from Saudi club Ittihad FC, to replace Croatian player Anas Sharbini. However the deal fell through when his agent was unable to complete the transfer. The player had been expected to fly to Saudi Arabia to hold negotiations but obtaining a visa to Saudi Arabia would have taken two days and the transfer window would close on the following day, so the deal could not be completed.

=== Çaykur Rizespor ===
On 1 August 2013, Adnan officially agreed to sign a five-year contract deal with Çaykur Rizespor. He chose the shirt number 53, as it was the same year the club Çaykur Rizespor was established, in 1953, stating that he feels that Çaykur Rizespor is like his home.

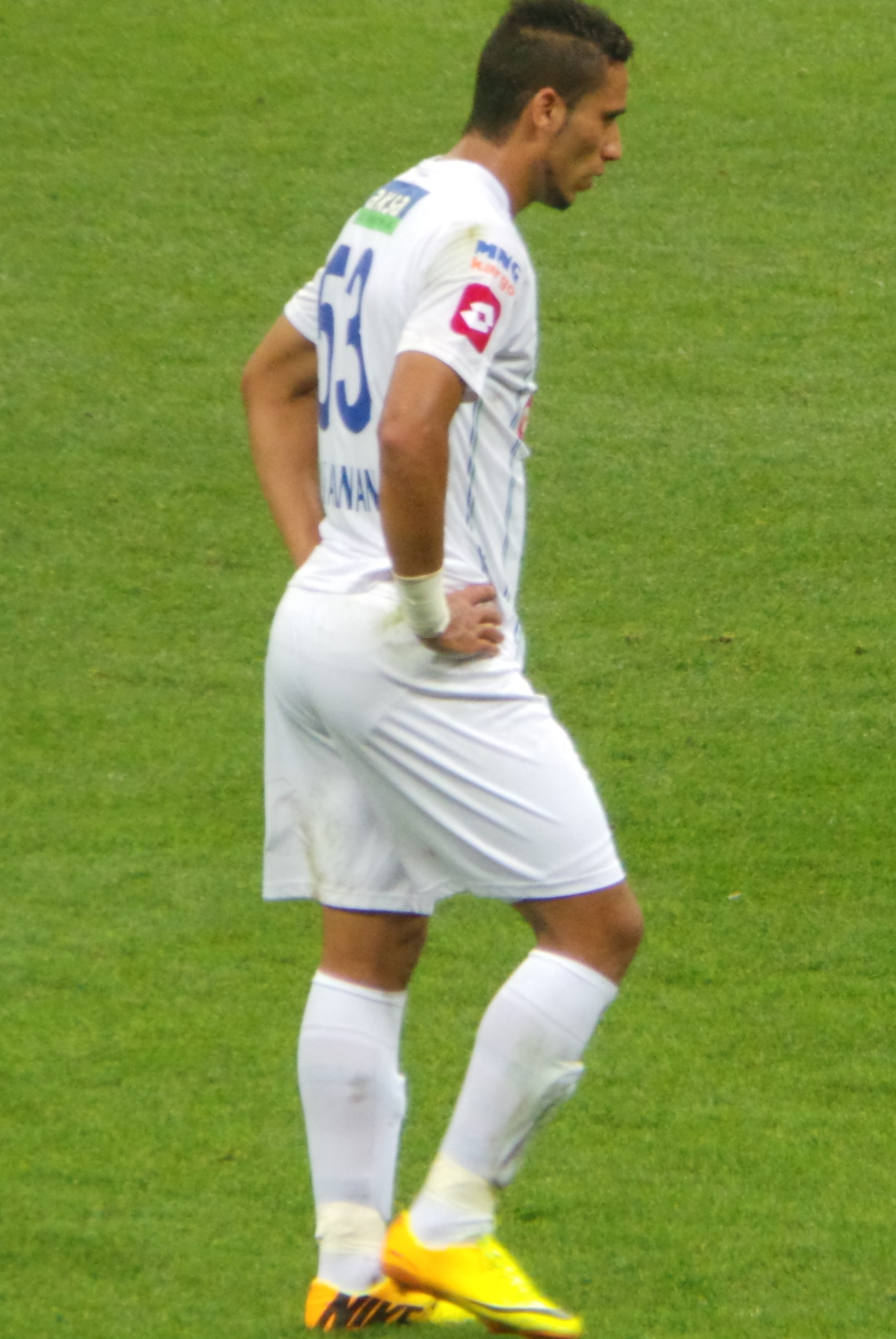
Adnan playing for Çaykur Rizespor against Galatasaray, 28 September 2013

On 1 September 2013, Adnan scored his first goal in the Turkish Süper Lig for Çaykur Rizespor against Kayseri Erciyesspor in the 7th minute from long distance. On 14 September 2013, Adnan scored his second goal with Çaykur Rizespor against Gaziantepspor from a free kick from 35 metres. Adnan contributed to his team with 4 goals and 10 assists, due to the football and the team he played, he became one of the fans' favorite footballers during his time playing at Çaykur Rizespor.

On 2 September 2013, Napoli made a €7 million transfer bid to Çaykur Rizespor for Adnan on a five-year deal, but it was rejected by Çaykur Rizespor's board of directors. According to the rizesporlular.com.

The following season, Adnan was a bench player or out of the squad. At the end of the season he moved to Italy.

=== Udinese ===
On 1 July 2015, Adnan was announced as Udinese's new signing with a five-year contract. This made Adnan the first ever Iraqi player to play in the Serie A. He made his competitive debut for the club in a 3–1 victory against Novara in the Coppa Italia, and his Serie A debut came in a 1–0 win away to defending champions Juventus. Adnan scored his first goal for the club by a free kick against Genoa where the game ended in a 2–1 defeat for his side. Adnan became a fan favorite at Udinese and impressed when he played. He had an impressive debut season in the Serie A, but his chances were limited in his second season after the arrival of a new manager and he was linked with moves away from the Italian club. Adnan impressed when he did play for Udinese, but his chances were limited as he was mainly used as a bench player and he has been linked with multiple moves away from the club.

==== Atalanta (loan) ====
On 17 August 2018, Adnan joined Atalanta on a season-long loan, in a deal that saw Marco D'Alessandro moving to in exchange. After a dispute with the manager, Gasperini, he was told he would be out of the manager's plans for the season. Since the dispute occurred after the winter transfer market closed, he was forced to make a move to a league outside Europe to continue playing until the end of the season.

==== Vancouver Whitecaps FC ====
On 9 March 2019, Vancouver Whitecaps FC of Major League Soccer announced that they had secured a loan deal until the end of June, and made the transfer permanent in July 2019. On 3 July 2021, Whitecaps FC and Adnan agreed to a mutual contract termination due to complications with his Visa.

=== Vejle Boldklub ===
On 5 November 2021, the club officially announced the signing of Adnan after 4 months without a club. Less than a month after his arrival, Adnan suffered a serious knee injury: the Iraqi tore one of the cruciate ligaments in his knee, meaning he would be out for the rest of the season. In May 2022 Vejle confirmed, that Adnan would leave the club, as his contract had come to an end.

=== Rubin Kazan ===
On 11 August 2022, Russian First League side Rubin Kazan announced the signing of Adnan after he had spent a number of weeks training with the club. He left Rubin as his contract expired in June 2023.

=== Al-Najma ===
On 19 July 2024, Adnan joined Saudi First Division League club Al-Najma.

== International career ==
=== Iraq U-20 ===
Adnan's breathtaking and scintillating performances were the highlight of the Iraq U-20's fairytale run to the semi-finals at the 2013 FIFA U-20 World Cup in Turkey. His goal against England U-20, that brought Iraq level at 2–2, epitomized his never-ending dynamism and drive. In the 93rd minute of the game, he cut inside from the by-line, bamboozling the opposition with his trickery, before darting past the English defense and blasting the ball past the keeper. His eagerness to get down the flank with his marauding runs; the ability to strike the ball from anywhere outside the penalty box with such ferocity and accuracy, and his all-round physical superiority over his competitors had caught the attention of observers at the tournament, and there were rumors that scouts from clubs from top European leagues had been watching the 19 year-old. He also managed to score the opening goal in the semi-finals against Uruguay U-20 from a narrow angle free-kick in a match ended 1–1 after extra time which saw Uruguay advance to the final by penalty shoot-out. During the tournament, several clubs had shown interest. Adnan has been linked with Spanish Club Sevilla, English club Arsenal, Turkish clubs Galatasaray, Bursaspor and Çaykur Rizespor, Italian clubs Genoa and Livorno. Also the Qatari club Al-Gharrafa showed interest in him. Adnan eventually signed for Caykur Rizespor.

=== Iraq U-23 ===
Adnan was chosen as part of the olympic team squad that represented Iraq in the Rio Olympics 2016 and was very crucial to the games providing many chances and was chosen as man of the match against Denmark. But after Iraq's 1–1 draw with South Africa (in which Adnan played a great deal of even providing an assist), Iraq finished with only 3 points as 3rd place in the table after Brazil and Denmark. This caused Iraq to crash out of the Rio olympics in the group stage.

After the Olympics, Adnan announced his shock retirement from international football via Twitter. The announcement came as a shock to all Iraqis and it was met with a lot of criticism as well as pleads for him to return. In the video, posted to Twitter, Adnan said that he would not play for Iraq at any level and that he was putting an "X" on his international career. The decision reportedly came after the Iraqi Olympic team were criticised following their performance in Brazil. After his retirement, Adnan's father, Adnan Kadhim, was on a popular Iraqi football talk show and he spoke to Ali via phone live on air in front of millions of viewers and spoke to him about reversing his decision. Adnan eventually went back on his decision and came out of retirement and has since played for Iraq.

=== Iraq ===
On 3 December 2012 at the age of 18, he announced his arrival on the international stage when he made his debut for the national side against Bahrain in Doha. In the process, Adnan became the first graduate from Ammo Baba’s football school to play for the senior team, only eleven years after the foundation of the school.

The player had not been selected by Brazilian coach Zico prior to the Bahrain game, but after he left the job, due to a dispute over unpaid wages, Hakim Shaker, Adnan's youth coach, was appointed to take charge of the senior side, and his first decision was to take the step to call-up the left back for the game. His display cemented his place as the best left back in the country, winning plaudits for his displays at the 2012 WAFF Championship.

He scored his first goal for Iraq national team in a 3–1 win over China PR during 2015 AFC Asian Cup qualification.

== Style of play ==
Adnan is a tall but fast player, which blends well to Iraq's counter-attack philosophy. He is an attack-minded left-back with a strong physique and a powerful long-range shot. He often advances quickly from the back into the opponent's half, using skilled footwork to pass defenders and midfielders. His energy, athleticism, and strength make him a challenging opponent, and he frequently contributes to the attack with skillful plays and long-range shots. Adnan is known for his effective runs down the left wing and important goals. Despite his attacking abilities, he also performs well defensively and is capable of making accurate long passes and crosses into the penalty area.

== Personal life ==
Adnan was born in the Iraqi capital Baghdad in the Adhamiyah vicinity on 19 December 1993. Football runs through his family bloodline, with both his father and uncle having played at the top level during the 1970s and 80s. His father Adnan Kadhim played for the Iraqi youth team in 1977, and won the 1977 AFC Youth Championship in Iran, and was a part of the squad of the first Iraqi youth side to play at the 1977 FIFA World Youth Championship in Tunisia, that same year. However, even though he played for first division clubs Al-Shabab, Al-Tijara and Al-Rasheed, he never made the ascent from club football to senior international football.

His uncle Ali Kadhim is considered one of the best strikers in the history of the national team, and scored 35 goals for the national team, from 1970 to 1980. This was the national record until Hussein Saeed broke it in 1982.

Adnan Kadhim regards his father as his idol and teacher in both life and sport. Throughout his career, his father has been by his side and was often seen at the Baghdad stadium watching his son from the sidelines. When Adnan came out with his shock retirement from international football in 2016, his father called him on-air and spoke to him about reversing his decision and Adnan eventually returned to the national team.

== Career statistics ==
=== Club ===
As of match played 18 December 2023

Appearances and goals by club, season and competition
Club	Season	League			Cup		Continental		Other		Total	
Club	Season	Division	Apps	Goals	Apps	Goals	Apps	Goals	Apps	Goals	Apps	Goals
Çaykur Rizespor	2013–14	Süper Lig	31	3	–		–		–		31	3
Çaykur Rizespor	2014–15	Süper Lig	10	0	6	1	–		–		16	1
Çaykur Rizespor	Total		41	3	6	1	0	0	0	0	47	4
Udinese	2015–16	Serie A	28	1	3	0	–		–		31	1
Udinese	2016–17	Serie A	14	0	0	0	–		–		14	0
Udinese	2017–18	Serie A	23	0	1	0	–		–		24	0
Udinese	2018–19	Serie A	0	0	1	0	–		–		1	0
Udinese	Total		65	1	5	0	0	0	0	0	70	1
Atalanta (loan)	2018–19	Serie A	3	0	0	0	1	0	–		4	0
Vancouver Whitecaps FC	2019–20	MLS	28	1	2	0	0	0	0	0	30	1
Vancouver Whitecaps FC	2020–21	MLS	23	2	3	1	0	0	0	0	26	3
Vancouver Whitecaps FC	Total		51	3	5	1	0	0	0	0	56	4
Vejle Boldklub	2021–22	Danish 1st Division	1	0	0	0	0	0	0	0	1	0
Rubin Kazan	2022–23	Russian First League	7	0	0	0	0	0	0	0	9	2
Mes Rafsanjan	2023–24	Persian Gulf Pro League	13	0	0	0	0	0	0	0	13	0
Career total			181	7	16	2	1	0	0	0	198	9

=== International ===
Scores and results list Iraq's goal tally first, score column indicates score after each Adnan goal.

List of international goals scored by Ali Adnan Kadhim
No.	Date	Venue	Opponent	Score	Result	Competition
1	5 March 2014	Sharjah Stadium, Dubai, United Arab Emirates	China	3–0	3–1	2015 AFC Asian Cup qualification
2	3 September 2015	Shahid Dastgerdi Stadium, Tehran, Iran	Chinese Taipei	1–0	5–1	2018 FIFA World Cup qualification
3	24 March 2016	Shahid Dastgerdi Stadium, Tehran, Iran	Thailand	2–2	2–2	2018 FIFA World Cup qualification
4	8 January 2019	Zayed Sports City Stadium, Abu Dhabi, United Arab Emirates	Vietnam	3–2	3–2	2019 AFC Asian Cup
5	10 October 2019	Basra Sports City, Basra, Iraq	Hong Kong	2–0	2–0	2022 FIFA World Cup qualification
6	17 November 2020	Maktoum bin Rashid Al Maktoum Stadium, Dubai, United Arab Emirates	Uzbekistan	2–1	2–1	Friendly
7	7 June 2021	Al Muharraq Stadium, Arad, Bahrain	Cambodia	3–0	4–1	2022 FIFA World Cup qualification

== Honours ==
Rubin Kazan

- Russian First League: 2022–23

Iraq U-20

- AFC U-19 Championship runner-up: 2012
- FIFA U-20 World Cup 4th-place: 2013

Iraq U-23

- Asian Games bronze-medal: 2014

Iraq

- WAFF Championship runner-up: 2012
- Arabian Gulf Cup runner-up: 2013
- AFC Asian Cup fourth-place: 2015

Individual

- Asian Young Footballer of the Year: 2013
- Sky Sports' 2013 FIFA U-20 World Cup XI Team of the Tournament – Left-back position.
- World Soccer Magazine's 2013 FIFA U-20 World Cup Top 10 stars of the Tournament.
- Goal.com's 2013 FIFA U-20 World Cup chosen among best top 10 players.
- Soccer Iraq Team of the Decade: 2010–2019
