= List of Vancouver Whitecaps FC players =

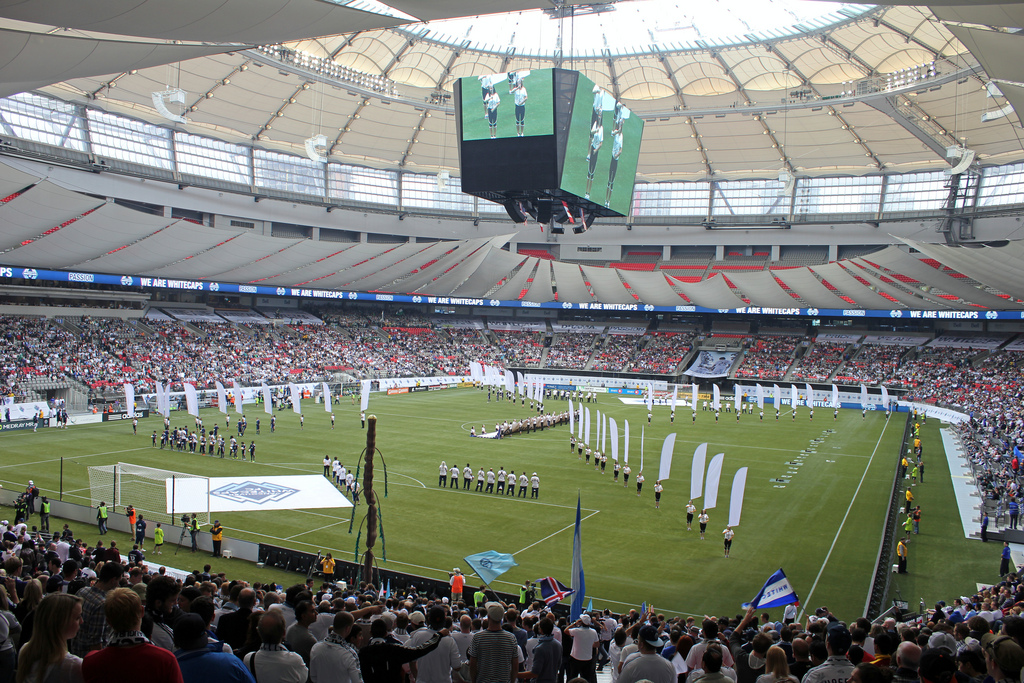
Whitecaps FC plays its home games at BC Place.

Vancouver Whitecaps FC is a Canadian soccer club in Vancouver, British Columbia. The club was moved up to Major League Soccer (MLS) after the ownership group of Greg Kerfoot, Steve Luczo, Jeff Mallett, and Steve Nash were awarded a franchise to play in Vancouver. Whitecaps FC began playing competitive soccer in the 2011 season, joining the Western Conference of MLS. It plays its home games at BC Place. The current Whitecaps FC is the third soccer team from Vancouver to bear the Whitecaps name. The tradition was started by Vancouver's North American Soccer League team in 1974, and continued by the city's Canadian Soccer League and United Soccer Leagues side, formed in 1986. The current iteration named Whitecaps FC played its first MLS game on March 19, 2011, a 4–2 victory against Toronto FC. French striker Eric Hassli scored the first goal in Whitecaps FC history.

As of October 28, 2018, eight goalkeepers and one hundred-four outfield players have participated in at least one MLS regular season match for Whitecaps FC. American defender Jordan Harvey leads the club in all-time MLS league appearances (178), while Brazilian striker Camilo Sanvezzo leads in all-time MLS league goals (39). Eight goalkeepers and eighty-eight outfield players have participated in at least one Voyageurs Cup or Canadian Championship match. Camilo Sanvezzo and Pedro Morales are the club's all-time leading goal scorers in Voyageurs Cup play, each with four goals. Three goalkeepers and thirty-nine outfield players have participated in at least one MLS Cup Playoffs match. Uruguayan midfielder Nicolás Mezquida is the club leader in playoff goals, with two. Three goalkeepers and forty outfield players have participated in at least one CONCACAF Champions League match. Uruguayan midfielder Cristian Techera is the club leader in continental goals, with five. This list does not include statistics from exhibition matches.

== Players ==
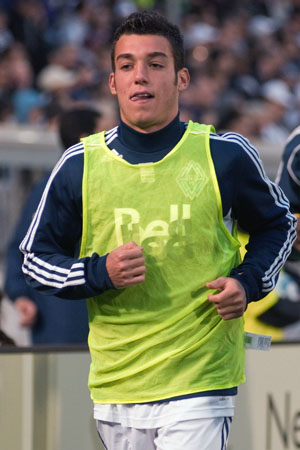
Russell Teibert, a member of the team since its inaugural MLS season, has played more games for Whitecaps FC than any other player

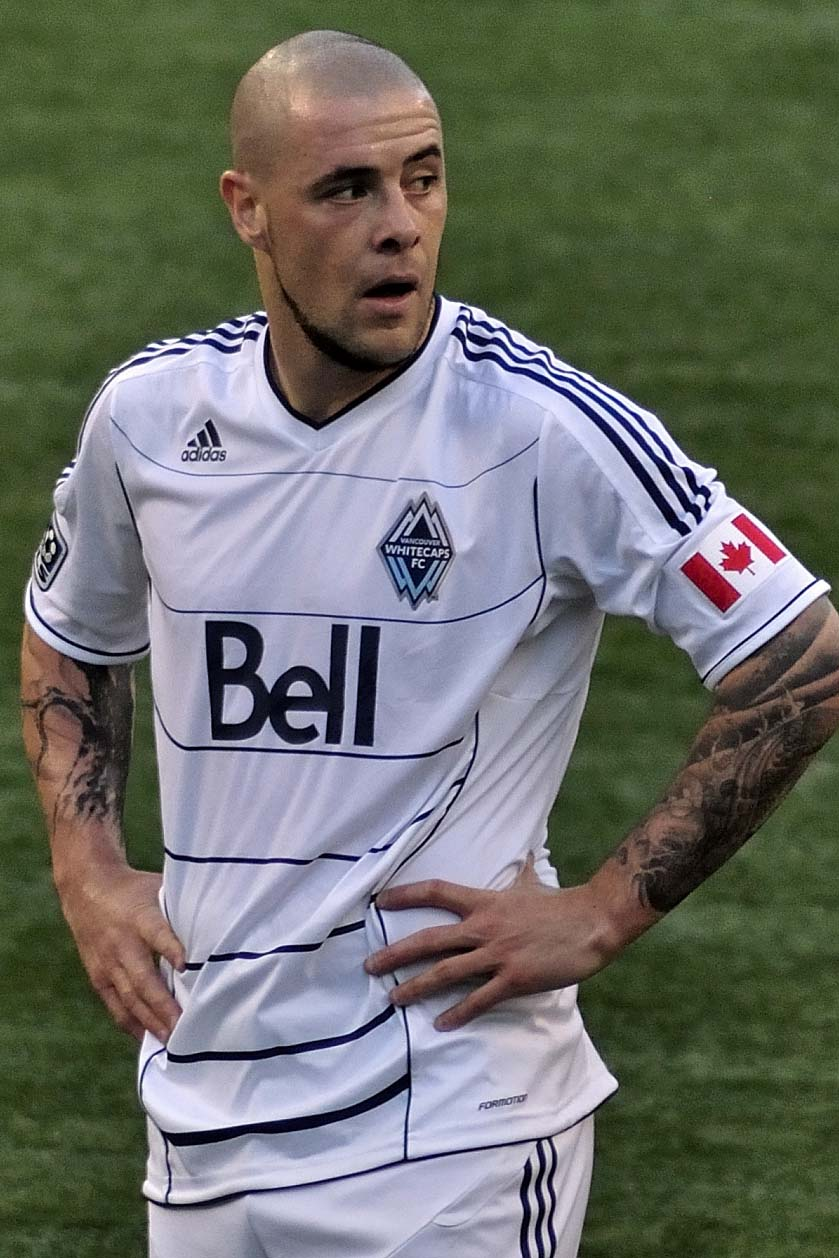
Eric Hassli was the first designated player in Whitecaps FC history.

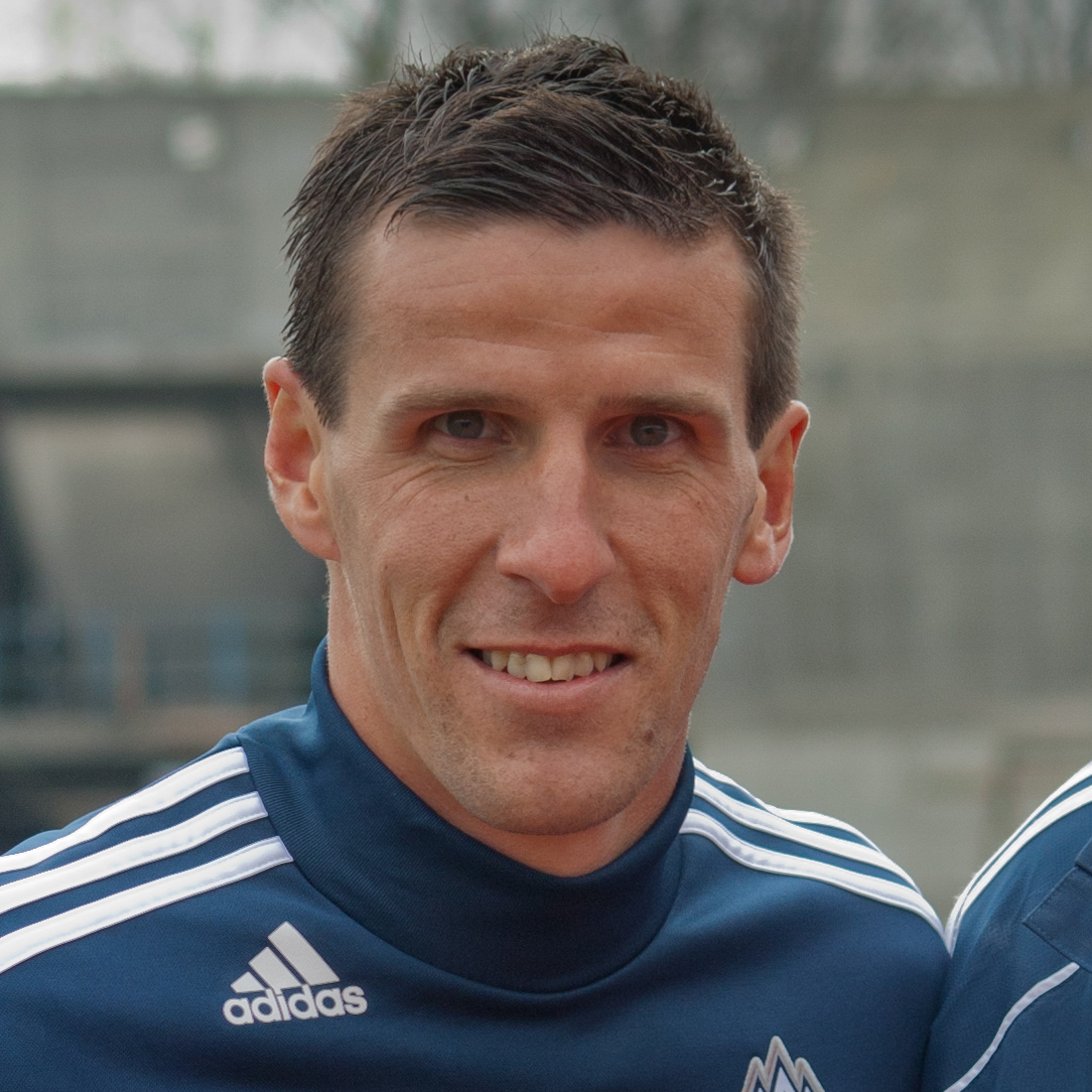
Sébastien Le Toux scored his first Whitecaps FC goal in his debut with the team.

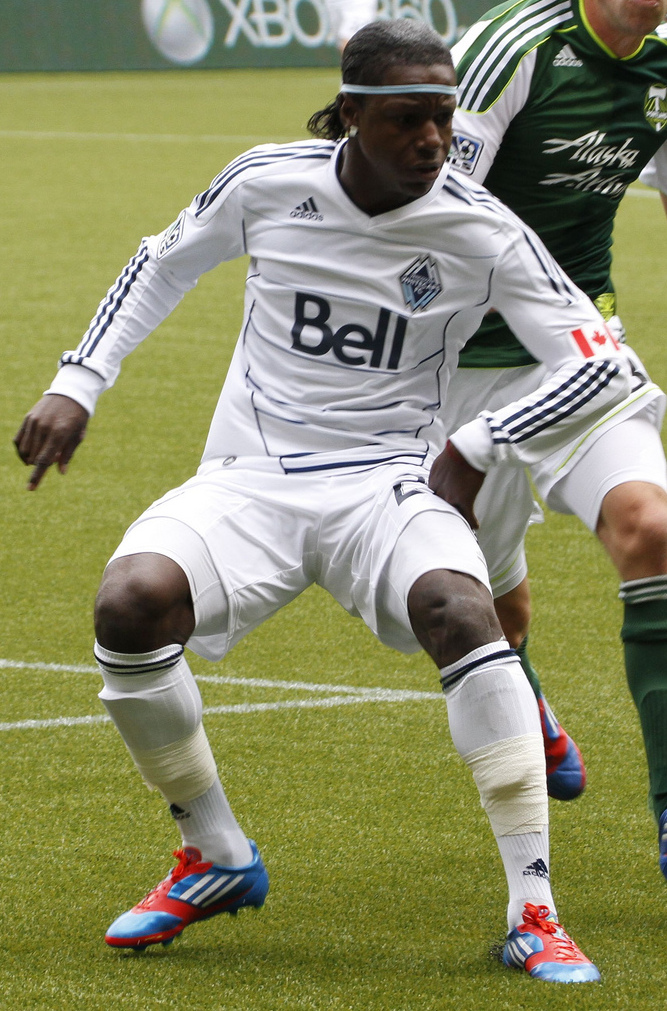
Darren Mattocks was the second overall choice in the 2012 MLS SuperDraft.

Key
DF	Defender	GK	Goalkeeper	MLS	Major League Soccer	CCL	CONCACAF Champions League
MF	Midfielder	GP	Games played	MLS Cup	MLS Cup Playoffs		
FW	Forward	G	Goals	CC	Canadian Championship		

- Statistics complete as of January 15, 2020.

Name	Position	Nationality	Years	GP	G	GP	G	GP	G	GP	G	GP	G	Notes	Ref.
Name	Position	Nationality	Years	MLS		MLS Cup		CC		CCL		Total		Notes	Ref.
Sam Adekugbe	DF	Canada	2013–2017, 2023 —	16	0	0	0	3	0	4	0	23	0		
Ali Adnan	DF	Iraq	2019–2021	28	1	0	0	2	0	0	0	30	1	Designated player	
Fraser Aird	DF	Canada	2016	17	0	0	0	2	0	4	0	23	0		
José Aja	DF	Uruguay	2018	17	1	0	0	0	0	0	0	17	1		
Mouloud Akloul	DF	France	2011	8	0	—	—	2	1	0	0	10	1		
Bryce Alderson	MF	Canada	2012–2014	0	0	0	0	2	0	0	0	2	0		
Joaquín Ardaiz	FW	Uruguay	2019	16	0	0	0	2	0	0	0	18	0		
Theo Bair	FW	Canada	2019–2022	17	2	0	0	1	0	0	0	18	2		
Mehdi Ballouchy	MF	Morocco	2014	9	0	0	0	0	0	0	0	9	0		
Lass Bangoura	FW	Guinea	2019	17	1	0	0	1	0	0	0	18	1		
Etienne Barbara	MF	Malta	2012	2	0	—	—	2	0	0	0	4	0		
Giles Barnes	FW	Jamaica	2016–2017	9	2	0	0	0	0	1	0	10	2		
Steven Beitashour	DF	Iran	2014–2015	54	0	2	0	2	0	0	0	58	0		
Anthony Blondell	FW	Venezuela	2018–2019	18	1	0	0	2	0	0	0	20	1		
Christian Bolaños	MF	Costa Rica	2016–2017	47	5	3	0	2	0	2	0	54	5		
Martín Bonjour	MF	Argentina	2012–2013	28	1	1	0	2	0	0	0	31	1		
Michael Boxall	DF	New Zealand	2011	19	0	—	—	2	0	0	0	21	0		
Jeb Brovsky	DF/MF	United States	2011	24	0	—	—	1	0	0	0	25	0		
Marco Bustos	MF	Canada	2015–2018	4	0	0	0	4	0	5	0	13	0		
Joe Cannon	GK	United States	2011–2013	56	0	—	—	3	0	0	0	59	0		
Marco Carducci	GK	Canada	2014–2016	0	0	0	0	2	0	0	0	2	0		
Michaell Chirinos	FW	Honduras	2019	7	1	0	0	0	0	0	0	7	1		
Davide Chiumiento	MF	Switzerland	2011–2012	42	2	—	—	7	0	0	0	49	2		
Caleb Clarke	FW	Canada	2012–2015	2	0	—	—	—	—	0	0	2	0		
Simon Colyn	MF	Canada	2018–	1	0	0	0	0	0	0	0	1	0		
Derek Cornelius	DF	Canada	2019–	17	1	0	0	1	0	0	0	18	1		
Maxime Crépeau	GK	Canada	2019–2021	26	0	0	0	2	0	0	0	28	0		
Jun Marques Davidson	MF	Japan	2012–2013	50	0	—	—	4	0	0	0	54	0		
Alphonso Davies	MF	Canada	2016–2018	65	8	1	0	8	2	7	2	81	12		
Marcel de Jong	DF	Canada	2016–2018	39	0	3	0	5	0	4	0	51	0		
Sem de Wit	DF	Netherlands	2017	0	0	0	0	1	0	0	0	1	0		
Christian Dean	DF	United States	2014–2017	12	0	0	0	5	0	4	0	21	0		
Jay DeMerit	DF	United States	2011–2014	71	1	1	0	5	0	0	0	77	1	Captain, 2011–2014	
Bilal Duckett	DF	United States	2011	4	0	—	—	—	—	0	0	4	0		
Terry Dunfield	MF	Canada	2011	12	1	—	—	4	1	0	0	16	2		
Robert Earnshaw	FW	Wales	2015	9	2	1	0	1	0	4	0	15	2		
David Edgar	DF	Canada	2016–2017	8	0	0	0	0	0	1	0	9	0		
Jon Erice	MF	Spain	2019	21	0	0	0	0	0	0	0	21	0	Captain, 2019	
Sebastián Fernández	FW	Uruguay	2014	32	5	1	0	2	0	0	0	35	5		
Deybi Flores	MF	Honduras	2015–2018	10	0	0	0	2	0	4	0	16	0		
Sean Franklin	DF	United States	2018	11	0	0	0	1	0	0	0	12	0		
Floyd Franks	MF	United States	2012	2	0	—	—	1	0	0	0	3	0		
Kianz Froese	MF	Canada	2014–2016	15	1	0	0	4	0	5	1	24	2		
Ali Ghazal	MF	Egypt	2017–2018	29	0	3	0	4	0	0	0	36	0		
Victor "PC" Giro	DF/MF	Brazil	2019	18	0	0	0	1	0	0	0	19	0		
Érik Godoy	DF	Argentina	2019–2022	29	1	0	0	2	0	0	0	31	1		
Kyle Greig	FW	United States	2017	1	0	0	0	2	1	5	0	8	1		
Kevin Harmse	MF	Canada	2011	3	0	—	—	—	—	0	0	3	0		
Atiba Harris	FW	Saint Kitts and Nevis	2011–2012	12	2	—	—	1	1	0	0	13	3		
Jordan Harvey	DF	United States	2011–2017	179	10	5	0	12	0	4	0	200	10		
Eric Hassli	FW	France	2011–2012	44	12	—	—	8	3	0	0	52	15	Designated player	
Tom Heinemann	FW	United States	2013	14	1	—	—	2	1	0	0	16	2		
Doneil Henry	DF	Canada	2018–2019	39	4	0	0	5	0	0	0	44	4		
Corey Hertzog	FW	United States	2013	7	1	—	—	2	1	0	0	9	2		
Erik Hurtado	FW	United States	2013–2018	105	12	1	1	12	2	5	2	123	17		
Bernie Ibini-Isei	MF	Australia	2017–2018	25	1	0	0	1	0	0	0	26	1		
Nosa Igiebor	MF	Nigeria	2017	1	0	2	0	0	0	0	0	3	0		
Hwang In-Beom	MF	South Korea	2019–2020	34	3	0	0	1	1	0	0	35	4	Designated player	
Andrew Jacobson	MF	United States	2016–2017	46	4	1	0	2	0	6	0	55	4		
Greg Janicki	DF	United States	2011	10	0	—	—	2	0	0	0	12	0		
Mustapha Jarju	FW	Gambia	2011	10	0	—	—	—	—	0	0	10	0	Designated player	
Efraín Juárez	MF	Mexico	2018	16	0	0	0	1	0	0	0	17	0		
Pa-Modou Kah	DF	Norway	2015–2016	30	3	0	0	1	0	2	0	33	3		
Kei Kamara	FW	Sierra Leone	2018	28	14	0	0	3	3	0	0	31	17		
Nizar Khalfan	MF	Tanzania	2011	22	1	—	—	4	0	0	0	26	1		
Jasser Khmiri	DF	Tunisia	2019–2021	1	0	0	0	0	0	0	0	1	0		
Greg Klazura	DF	United States	2012–2013	2	0	—	—	4	0	0	0	6	0		
Wes Knight	DF	United States	2011	12	0	—	—	—	—	0	0	12	0		
Brad Knighton	GK	United States	2012–2013	21	0	1	0	6	0	0	0	28	0		
Daigo Kobayashi	MF	Japan	2013	30	2	—	—	2	1	0	0	32	3		
Gershon Koffie	MF	Ghana	2011–2015	133	9	4	0	13	1	1	0	151	10		
Masato Kudo	FW	Japan	2016	17	2	0	0	0	0	2	1	19	3		
Matías Laba	MF	Argentina	2014–2017	113	3	3	0	6	1	7	0	129	4		
Sébastien Le Toux	FW	France	2012	19	4	—	—	3	2	0	0	22	6		
Jonathan Leathers	DF	United States	2011	22	0	—	—	4	0	0	0	26	0		
Young-Pyo Lee	DF	South Korea	2012–2013	65	1	1	0	3	0	0	0	69	1		
Johnny Leverón	DF	Honduras	2013–2014	34	0	—	—	6	0	0	0	40	0		
Brett Levis	DF	Canada	2016–2019	24	0	0	0	1	0	4	0	29	0		
Zac MacMath	GK	United States	2019	8	0	0	0	0	0	0	0	8	0		
Kekuta Manneh	FW	United States	2013–2017	101	22	3	0	11	1	3	1	118	24		
Stefan Marinovic	GK	New Zealand	2017–2018	28	0	3	0	4	0	—	—	35	0		
Felipe Martins	MF	Brazil	2018–2019	47	2	0	0	3	0	0	0	50	2		
Darren Mattocks	FW	Jamaica	2012–2016	93	19	4	1	11	2	3	0	111	22		
Aaron Maund	DF	United States	2017–2018	12	0	0	0	1	0	—	—	13	0		
Brendan McDonough	DF	United States	2019	1	0	0	0	0	0	0	0	1	0		
Ben McKendry	MF	Canada	2015–2017	1	0	0	0	4	0	2	0	7	0		
Nicolás Mezquida	MF	Uruguay	2014–2018	101	12	3	2	12	3	6	0	122	17		
Kenny Miller	FW	Scotland	2012–2014	43	13	1	0	1	0	0	0	45	13	Designated player	
Carlyle Mitchell	DF	Trinidad and Tobago	2011–2014	28	1	—	—	4	0	—	—	32	1		
Fredy Montero	FW	Colombia	2017, 2019–2020	65	21	3	1	0	0	3	1	72	23	Designated player	
Pedro Morales	MF	Chile	2014–2016	82	25	3	0	7	4	2	0	94	29	Captain, 2014–2016; Designated player	
Alexandre Morfaw	MF	Cameroon	2011	2	0	—	—	—	—	0	0	2	0		
Georges Mukumbilwa	DF/MF	Canada	2019–2020	1	0	0	0	0	0	0	0	1	0		
Jordon Mutch	MF	England	2018	18	2	0	0	0	0	0	0	18	2		
Michael Nanchoff	MF	United States	2011–2012	14	0	—	—	2	0	0	0	16	0		
Jake Nerwinski	DF	United States	2017–	71	1	3	0	7	0	2	0	83	1		
Jay Nolly	GK	United States	2011	14	0	—	—	3	0	0	0	17	0		
David Norman Jr.	MF	Canada	2018–2019	0	0	0	0	1	0	0	0	1	0		
Andy O'Brien	DF	Ireland	2012–2014	50	0	2	0	4	0	0	0	56	0		
David Ousted	GK	Denmark	2013–2017	142	0	3	0	2	0	4	0	151	0	Captain, 2016–2017	
Tim Parker	DF	United States	2015–2017	76	1	5	0	8	2	11	1	100	4		
Blas Pérez	FW	Panama	2016	21	2	0	0	2	0	3	1	26	3		
Nigel Reo-Coker	MF	England	2013–2014	44	1	—	—	5	0	0	0	49	1		
Yordy Reyna	FW	Peru	2017–2020	69	18	3	0	5	1	0	0	77	20		
Dane Richards	MF	Jamaica	2012	12	3	1	0	—	—	0	0	13	3		
Spencer Richey	GK	United States	2017–2018	1	0	0	0	2	0	2	0	5	0		
Tosaint Ricketts	FW	Canada	2019–2022	8	1	0	0	0	0	0	0	8	1		
Octavio Rivero	FW	Uruguay	2014–2016	46	12	2	0	4	2	0	0	52	14	Designated player	
Barry Robson	MF	Scotland	2012–2013	17	3	1	0	—	—	0	0	18	3	Designated player	
Alain Rochat	DF	Switzerland	2011–2013	67	5	1	0	9	0	0	0	77	5		
Diego Rodríguez	DF	Uruguay	2015	4	0	0	0	1	0	4	0	9	0		
Mauro Rosales	MF	Argentina	2014–2015, 2017	40	1	3	0	3	0	0	0	46	1	Designated player	
Andy Rose	MF	England	2019–2021	24	1	0	0	2	0	0	0	26	1		
Brian Rowe	GK	United States	2018	10	0	0	0	0	0	0	0	10	0		
Brad Rusin	DF	United States	2013–2014	19	0	—	—	1	—	0	0	20	0		
Omar Salgado	FW	United States	2011–2014	29	1	—	—	5	—	0	0	34	1		
Shea Salinas	MF	United States	2011	26	1	—	—	4	0	0	0	30	1		
Ethen Sampson	DF	South Africa	2014–2015	3	0	1	0	2	0	1	0	7	0		
Camilo Sanvezzo	FW	Brazil	2011–2013	92	39	—	—	11	4	0	0	103	43		
Cole Seiler	DF	United States	2016–2017	2	0	0	0	3	0	1	0	6	0		
Brek Shea	MF	United States	2017–2018	53	7	3	0	6	1	3	1	65	9	Designated player	
Jordan Smith	DF	Costa Rica	2015–2016	24	0	0	0	1	0	4	0	29	0		
Scott Sutter	DF	Switzerland	2019	16	1	0	0	2	0	0	0	18	1		
Long Tan	FW	China	2011–2012	17	1	—	—	1	0	0	0	18	1		
Tony Tchani	MF	Cameroon	2017	27	4	2	0	0	0	1	0	30	4		
Cristian Techera	MF	Uruguay	2015–2018	101	23	5	1	8	0	6	5	120	29		
Russell Teibert	MF	Canada	2011–	164	3	1	0	24	0	7	0	196	3		
John Thorrington	MF	United States	2011–2012	30	0	1	0	4	0	0	0	35	0		
Paolo Tornaghi	GK	Italy	2014–2017	2	0	0	0	6	0	6	0	14	0		
Peter Vagenas	MF	United States	2011	16	0	—	—	—	—	0	0	16	0		
Lucas Venuto	FW	Brazil	2019	22	3	0	0	2	0	0	0	24	3		
Blake Wagner	DF/MF	United States	2011	9	0	—	—	2	0	0	0	11	0		
Kendall Waston	DF	Costa Rica	2014–2018	115	14	6	1	8	0	8	0	137	15	Captain, 2017–2018; Designated player	
Matt Watson	MF	England	2012–2013	36	0	1	0	2	0	0	0	39	0		
Sheanon Williams	DF	United States	2017	15	0	0	0	0	0	3	0	18	0		
Deklan Wynne	DF	New Zealand	2017	0	0	0	0	1	0	1	0	2	0		

== See also ==
- All-time Vancouver Whitecaps roster—equivalent list for the club's CSL Division 1 years and US Division 2 years.
