= 2011 Vancouver Whitecaps FC season =

Vancouver Whitecaps FC 2011 soccer season

Vancouver Whitecaps FC
2011 season
- Chairman: Greg Kerfoot
- Interim coach: Tom Soehn
- Stadium: Empire Field (March to September); BC Place (October)
- Major League Soccer: 18th
- Canadian Championship: Runners-up
- Cascadia Cup: 3rd
- Top goalscorer: League: Camilo (12); All: Camilo (13)
- Highest home attendance: 27,500 vs. Los Angeles Galaxy (July 30, 2011)
- Lowest home attendance: 15,474 vs. Toronto FC (May 18, 2011)
- Average home league attendance: 20,153
Home colours	Away colours

The 2011 Vancouver Whitecaps FC season was the Whitecaps' debut season in Major League Soccer. The MLS club has incorporated the history of its NASL and various lower division predecessors into its marketing campaigns, reflecting 36 years of professional soccer in Vancouver.

On March 19, 2011, Vancouver Whitecaps defeated Toronto FC at Empire Field in their league opening match by a score of 4–2. It was the first match between two Canadian clubs in league history. Vancouver Whitecaps gave up the 8,000th goal in league history in the game. The regular season ended at BC Place on October 22, 2011, with a 2–1 loss to Colorado Rapids leaving them in last place overall.

== Players ==
=== Squad ===
Updated September 15, 2011.

No.	Player	Nationality	Position	Date of birth (age)	Previous club
Goalkeepers
1	Joe Cannon	(United States)	GK	January 1, 1975 (age 51)	(United States) San Jose
18	Jay Nolly	(United States)	GK	January 2, 1982 (age 44)	(Canada) Vancouver (USSF-D2)
24	Brian Sylvestre	(United States)	GK	December 19, 1992 (age 33)	(Canada) Vancouver (Residency)
Defenders
2	Michael Boxall	(New Zealand)	CB	August 18, 1988 (age 38)	(United States) UC Santa Barbara
3	Bilal Duckett	(United States)	CB	January 9, 1989 (age 37)	(United States) Notre Dame
4	Alain Rochat	(Switzerland)	LB	February 1, 1983 (age 43)	(Canada) Vancouver (USSF-D2)
6	Jay DeMerit	(United States)	CB	December 4, 1979 (age 46)	(England) Watford
14	Greg Janicki	(United States)	CB	July 9, 1984 (age 42)	(Canada) Vancouver (USSF-D2)
19	Carlyle Mitchell	(Trinidad and Tobago)	CB	August 8, 1987 (age 39)	(Trinidad and Tobago) Joe Public
25	Jonathan Leathers	(United States)	RB	November 5, 1985 (age 41)	(United States) Kansas City
26	Jordan Harvey	(United States)	LB	January 28, 1984 (age 42)	(United States) Philadelphia
Midfielders
11	John Thorrington	(United States)	MF	November 17, 1979 (age 46)	(United States) Chicago
12	Jeb Brovsky	(United States)	CM	December 3, 1988 (age 37)	(United States) Notre Dame
13	Michael Nanchoff	(United States)	MF	September 24, 1988 (age 38)	(United States) Akron
15	Philippe Davies	(Canada)	MF	December 20, 1990 (age 35)	(Canada) Vancouver (USSF-D2)
16	Nizar Khalfan	(Tanzania)	MF	June 21, 1988 (age 38)	(Canada) Vancouver (USSF-D2)
20	Davide Chiumiento	(Switzerland)	RW	November 22, 1984 (age 41)	(Canada) Vancouver (USSF-D2)
22	Shea Salinas	(United States)	LW	June 24, 1986 (age 40)	(United States) Philadelphia
27	Alexandre Morfaw	(Cameroon)	MF	August 31, 1987 (age 39)	(Canada) Vancouver (USSF-D2)
28	Gershon Koffie	(Ghana)	MF	August 25, 1991 (age 35)	(Canada) Vancouver (USSF-D2)
31	Russell Teibert	(Canada)	LW	December 22, 1992 (age 33)	(Canada) Vancouver (USSF-D2)
33	Peter Vagenas	(United States)	CM	February 6, 1978 (age 48)	(United States) Seattle
Forwards
7	Mustapha Jarju	(The Gambia)	ST	July 18, 1986 (age 40)	(Belgium) R.A.E.C. Mons
9	Atiba Harris	(Saint Kitts and Nevis)	ST	January 9, 1985 (age 41)	(United States) Dallas
17	Omar Salgado	(United States)	ST	September 10, 1993 (age 33)	(Mexico) Guadalajara
23	Long Tan	(China)	FW	April 1, 1988 (age 38)	(United States) Tampa Bay
29	Eric Hassli	(France)	ST	May 3, 1981 (age 45)	(Switzerland) Zürich
37	Camilo	(Brazil)	ST	July 21, 1988 (age 38)	(South Korea) Gyeongnam

=== Transfers in ===
Date	Player	Position	Previous club	Fee/notes	Ref
November 18, 2010	(United States) Jay DeMerit	DF	(England) Watford	Free transfer; rights acquired via allocation ranking	
November 24, 2010	(The Gambia) Sanna Nyassi	MF	(United States) Seattle Sounders FC	Expansion Draft, subsequently traded	
November 24, 2010	(Saint Kitts and Nevis) Atiba Harris	FW	(United States) FC Dallas	Expansion Draft	
November 24, 2010	(United States) Nathan Sturgis	MF	(United States) Seattle Sounders FC	Expansion Draft, subsequently traded	
November 24, 2010	(United States) Shea Salinas	MF	(United States) Philadelphia Union	Expansion Draft	
November 24, 2010	(United States) Alan Gordon	FW	(United States) Chivas USA	Expansion Draft, subsequently traded	
November 24, 2010	(Jamaica) O'Brian White	FW	(Canada) Toronto FC	Expansion Draft, subsequently traded	
November 24, 2010	(Venezuela) Alejandro Moreno	FW	(United States) Philadelphia Union	Expansion Draft, subsequently traded	
November 24, 2010	(United States) Joe Cannon	GK	(United States) San Jose Earthquakes	Expansion Draft	
November 24, 2010	(United States) Jonathan Leathers	DF	(United States) Sporting Kansas City	Expansion Draft	
November 24, 2010	(United States) John Thorrington	MF	(United States) Chicago Fire	Expansion Draft	
November 26, 2010	(United States) Jay Nolly	GK	(Canada) Vancouver Whitecaps FC (USSF-D2)	Free	
November 26, 2010	(United States) Wes Knight	DF	(Canada) Vancouver Whitecaps FC (USSF-D2)	Free	
November 26, 2010	(Canada) Philippe Davies	MF	(Canada) Vancouver Whitecaps FC (USSF-D2)	Free	
December 10, 2010	(Canada) Terry Dunfield	MF	(Canada) Vancouver Whitecaps FC (USSF-D2)	Free	
December 10, 2010	(United States) Greg Janicki	DF	(Canada) Vancouver Whitecaps FC (USSF-D2)	Free	
January 13, 2011	(United States) Omar Salgado	FW	United States U-20's	SuperDraft, 1st round	
January 21, 2011	(Switzerland) Alain Rochat	DF	(Switzerland) Zürich	Undisclosed	
February 9, 2011	(Tanzania) Nizar Khalfan	MF	(Canada) Vancouver Whitecaps FC (USSF-D2)	Free	
February 9, 2011	(Ghana) Gershon Koffie	MF	(Canada) Vancouver Whitecaps FC (USSF-D2)	Free	
March 4, 2011	(France) Eric Hassli	FW	(Switzerland) FC Zürich	Undisclosed	
March 8, 2011	(Switzerland) Davide Chiumiento	MF	(Canada) Vancouver Whitecaps FC (USSF-D2)	Free	
March 11, 2011	(United States) Blake Wagner	DF	(Canada) Vancouver Whitecaps FC (USSF-D2)	Free	
March 11, 2011	(China) Long Tan	FW	(Canada) Vancouver Whitecaps FC (USSF-D2)	Free	
March 15, 2011	(United States) Brian Sylvestre	GK	(Canada) Vancouver Whitecaps Residency	Free	
March 15, 2011	(United States) Jeb Brovsky	DF	(United States) University of Notre Dame	SuperDraft, 2nd round	
March 15, 2011	(United States) Bilal Duckett	DF	(United States) University of Notre Dame	SuperDraft, 3rd round	
March 17, 2011	(Canada) Russell Teibert	MF	(Canada) Vancouver Whitecaps FC (USSF-D2)	Free; signed to Generation Adidas contract	
March 17, 2011	(Cameroon) Alexandre Morfaw	MF	(Canada) Vancouver Whitecaps FC (USSF-D2)	Free	
March 17, 2011	(New Zealand) Michael Boxall	DF	(United States) UC Santa Barbara	Supplemental Draft, 1st round	
March 17, 2011	(Brazil) Camilo Sanvezzo	FW	(South Korea) Gyeongnam FC	Undisclosed	
March 25, 2011	(Canada) Kevin Harmse	DF	Unattached	Free	
March 31, 2011	(France) Mouloud Akloul	DF	(Canada) Vancouver Whitecaps FC (USSF-D2)	Free	
April 28, 2011	(United States) Peter Vagenas	MF	Unattached	Free	
July 7, 2011	(United States) Jordan Harvey	DF	(United States) Philadelphia Union	Allocation money	
July 12, 2011	(The Gambia) Mustapha Jarju	FW	(Belgium) R.A.E.C. Mons	Free	
September 15, 2011	(Trinidad and Tobago) Carlyle Mitchell	CB	(Trinidad and Tobago) Joe Public	Free	

=== Transfers out ===
Date	Player	Position	Destination club	Fee/notes	Ref
November 24, 2010	(United States) Alan Gordon	FW	(United States) Chivas USA	Traded for allocation money and use of an International Roster Spot for 2011	
November 24, 2010	(Venezuela) Alejandro Moreno	FW	(United States) Chivas USA	Traded for allocation money and use of an International Roster Spot for 2011	
November 24, 2010	(The Gambia) Sanna Nyassi	MF	(United States) Colorado Rapids	Traded for an International Roster Spot	
November 24, 2010	(Jamaica) O'Brian White	FW	(United States) Seattle Sounders FC	Traded for allocation money	
November 25, 2010	(United States) Nathan Sturgis	MF	(Canada) Toronto FC	Traded for a 2011 SuperDraft Round 1 pick	
June 10, 2011	(Canada) Kevin Harmse	DF		Waived	
July 14, 2011	(Canada) Terry Dunfield	MF	(Canada) Toronto FC	Traded for allocation money and rights to Keven Aleman	
July 28, 2011	(France) Mouloud Akloul	DF		Waived	
July 28, 2011	(United States) Blake Wagner	DF	(United States) Real Salt Lake	Waived, free transfer	
August 31, 2011	(United States) Wes Knight	DF		Waived	

== Stats ==
Last updated for match on October 22, 2011.

No.	Pos	Nat	Player	Total		Major League Soccer		Canadian Championship	
No.	Pos	Nat	Player	Apps	Goals	Apps	Goals	Apps	Goals
1	GK	(United States) USA	Joe Cannon	21	0	20+0	0	1+0	0
2	DF	(New Zealand) NZL	Michael Boxall	21	0	18+1	0	2+0	0
3	DF	(United States) USA	Bilal Duckett	4	0	2+2	0	0+0	0
4	DF	(Switzerland) SUI	Alain Rochat	32	3	27+1	3	4+0	0
6	DF	(United States) USA	Jay DeMerit	23	0	20+1	0	2+0	0
7	MF	(The Gambia) GAM	Mustapha Jarju	10	0	5+5	0	0+0	0
9	FW	(Saint Kitts and Nevis) SKN	Atiba Harris	5	2	5+0	2	0+0	0
11	MF	(United States) USA	John Thorrington	11	0	9+2	0	0+0	0
12	MF	(United States) USA	Michael Nanchoff	5	0	1+4	0	0+0	0
13	DF	(United States) USA	Jeb Brovsky	25	0	16+8	0	1+0	0
14	DF	(United States) USA	Greg Janicki	12	0	8+2	0	2+0	0
15	MF	(Canada) CAN	Philippe Davies	0	0	0+0	0	0+0	0
16	MF	(Tanzania) TAN	Nizar Khalfan	26	1	9+13	1	0+4	0
17	FW	(United States) USA	Omar Salgado	16	1	5+9	1	1+1	0
18	GK	(United States) USA	Jay Nolly	17	0	14+0	0	3+0	0
19	DF	(Trinidad and Tobago) TTO	Carlyle Mitchell	3	0	3+0	0	0+0	0
20	MF	(Switzerland) SUI	Davide Chiumiento	29	2	20+6	2	3+0	0
22	MF	(United States) USA	Shea Salinas	30	1	18+8	1	2+2	0
23	FW	(China) CHN	Long Tan	13	1	4+9	1	0+0	0
24	GK	(United States) USA	Brian Sylvestre	0	0	0+0	0	0+0	0
25	DF	(United States) USA	Jonathan Leathers	26	0	21+1	0	4+0	0
26	DF	(United States) USA	Jordan Harvey	14	0	14+0	0	0+0	0
27	MF	(Cameroon) CMR	Alexandre Morfaw	2	0	1+1	0	0+0	0
28	MF	(Ghana) GHA	Gershon Koffie	32	1	28+1	1	3+0	0
29	FW	(France) FRA	Eric Hassli	30	11	21+5	10	4+0	1
31	MF	(Canada) CAN	Russell Teibert	15	0	5+6	0	2+2	0
33	MF	(United States) USA	Peter Vagenas	16	0	13+3	0	0+0	0
37	FW	(Brazil) BRA	Camilo	36	13	29+3	12	3+1	1
-	DF	(France) FRA	Mouloud Akloul*	10	1	7+1	0	2+0	1
-	MF	(Canada) CAN	Terry Dunfield*	16	2	11+1	1	4+0	1
-	DF	(Canada) CAN	Kevin Harmse*	3	0	1+2	0	0+0	0
-	MF	(United States) USA	Blake Wagner*	11	0	9+0	0	1+1	0
-	DF	(United States) USA	Wes Knight*	12	0	10+2	0	0+0	0

* = Player is no longer with team

=== Starting XI ===
MLS regular season matches only.

No.	Pos.	Nat.	Name	MS	Notes
18	GK	(United States)	Nolly	14	Cannon has 12 starts.
25	RB	(United States)	Leathers	19	
2	CB	(New Zealand)	Boxall	16	
6	CB	(United States)	DeMerit	12	Janicki has 8 starts.
4	LB	(Switzerland)	Rochat	21	Harvey has 6 starts.
20	RW	(Switzerland)	Chiumiento	16	Knight has 10 starts.
13	CM	(United States)	Brovsky	11	Vagenas has 9 starts.
28	CM	(Ghana)	Koffie	20	
22	LW	(United States)	Salinas	14	Teibert has 5 starts.
37	FW	(Brazil)	Camilo	21	Jarju has 3 starts.
29	FW	(France)	Hassli	17	Salgado has 5 starts.

Last updated: August 27, 2011
Source: Squad stats and Start formations.
Only competitive matches.
Using the most used start formation.
Ordered by position on pitch (from back right to front left).

== Club ==
=== Front office and staff ===
Position	Staff
Owners	(Canada) Greg Kerfoot (United States) Stephen Luczo (Canada) Jeff Mallett (Canada) Steve Nash
Head Coach	(United States) Tom Soehn
Assistant Coaches	(Canada) Colin Miller (United States) Denis Hamlett
Staff Coach	(Canada) Martin Nash
Goalkeeping Coach	(Norway) Marius Rovde
Director of Operations	(United States) Tom Soehn
Youth Director	(Netherlands) Richard Grootscholten

Last updated: January 8, 2011
Source: Vancouver Whitecaps FC Official Website

== Competitions ==
=== Preseason ===
Before a six-week winter break, the Whitecaps trained for a week in Oxnard, California. During that period, they played an inter-squad scrimmage, as well as two matches against local fourth-tier PDL club Ventura County Fusion. The Whitecaps defeated the Fusion 2–1 on December 2, with goals from Terry Dunfield and Nizar Khalfan, and 3–1 on December 8, with goals from Nizar Khalfan, Kyle Porter and Terry Dunfield.

==== Winter Camp ====
December 2, 2010	Ventura County	1–2	Vancouver	Oxnard, California, U.S.
13:30 PDT	Bowen 40' (pen.)	Report	2' Dunfield; 64' Khalfan	Stadium: Bulldog Stadium

December 5, 2010	Blue	4–0	Orange	Oxnard, California, U.S.
14:00 PDT	Khalfan 7', 28'; Porter 57', 59'	Report		Stadium: Bulldog Stadium

December 8, 2010	Ventura County	1–3	Vancouver	Oxnard, California, U.S.
13:30 PDT	Berrera 30'	Report	40' Khalfan; 58' Porter; 64' Dunfield	Stadium: Bulldog Stadium

==== Arizona training ====
February 1, 2011	Salt Lake	1–2	Vancouver	Casa Grande, Arizona, U.S.
10:00 PST	Alvarez 49'	Report	17' Teibert; 57' Dunfield	Stadium: Grande Sports World; Attendance: Closed door

February 4, 2011	Seattle	1–0	Vancouver	Casa Grande, Arizona, U.S.
16:30 PST	Evans 63'	Report		Stadium: Grande Sports World; Attendance: Closed door

February 8, 2011	Columbus	1–2	Vancouver	Casa Grande, Arizona, U.S.
09:30 PST	Gaven 76' (pen.)	Report	62' Harris; 77' Salgado	Stadium: Grande Sports World; Attendance: Closed door

February 18, 2011	Chivas USA	1–0	Vancouver	Casa Grande, Arizona, U.S.
14:00 PST	Padilla 89' (pen.)	Report		Stadium: Grande Sports World; Attendance: Closed door

February 19, 2011	United States U-20's	2–2	Vancouver	Avondale, Arizona, U.S.
15:45 PST		Report	13' Long; 72' Camilo	Stadium: Westside Soccer Complex; Attendance: Closed door

February 21, 2011	Los Angeles	2–0	Vancouver	Avondale, Arizona, U.S.
15:00 PST	Birchall 26'; Ángel 44'	Report		Stadium: Westside Soccer Complex; Attendance: Closed door

==== Cascadia Summit ====
March 5, 2011	Portland	1–1	Vancouver	Tukwila, Washington USA
16:00 PDT	Pore 5'	Report	Horst 36' (o.g.)	Stadium: Starfire Sports Complex; Attendance: 3,100; Referee: Ricardo Salazar

March 6, 2011	Seattle	2–3	Vancouver	Tukwila, Washington, U.S.
15:00 PDT	Levesque 45'; Montaño 77'	Report	Salgado 6'; Teibert 12'; Camilo 47'	Stadium: Starfire Sports Complex; Attendance: 3,100

=== Overall ===
Competition	Started round	Final position / round	First match	Last match
Major League Soccer	—	18th	May 19, 2011	October 22, 2011
Canadian Championship	Semifinals	Runner-up	April 27, 2011	July 2, 2011

Updated to match played October 22, 2012
Source: Competitions

=== Major League Soccer ===
Vancouver Whitecaps FC's first regular season in Major League Soccer begins March 19, 2011 and ends October 22, 2011.

==== League table ====
Pos	Team	Pld	W	L	T	GF	GA	GD	Pts	
1	LA Galaxy (S, C)	34	19	5	10	48	28	+20	67	Qualification for the 2012–13 CONCACAF Champions League group stage
2	Seattle Sounders FC (U)	34	18	7	9	56	37	+19	63	Qualification for the 2012–13 CONCACAF Champions League group stage
3	Real Salt Lake	34	15	11	8	44	36	+8	53	Qualification for the 2012–13 CONCACAF Champions League group stage
4	FC Dallas	34	15	12	7	42	39	+3	52	
5	Sporting Kansas City	34	13	9	12	50	40	+10	51	
6	Houston Dynamo	34	12	9	13	45	41	+4	49	Qualification for the 2012–13 CONCACAF Champions League group stage
7	Colorado Rapids	34	12	9	13	44	41	+3	49	
8	Philadelphia Union	34	11	8	15	44	36	+8	48	
9	Columbus Crew	34	13	13	8	43	44	−1	47	
10	New York Red Bulls	34	10	8	16	50	44	+6	46	
11	Chicago Fire	34	9	9	16	46	45	+1	43	
12	Portland Timbers	34	11	14	9	40	48	−8	42	
13	D.C. United	34	9	13	12	49	52	−3	39	
14	San Jose Earthquakes	34	8	12	14	40	45	−5	38	
15	Chivas USA	34	8	14	12	41	43	−2	36	
16	Toronto FC (V)	34	6	13	15	36	59	−23	33	Qualification for the 2011–12 CONCACAF Champions League preliminary round
17	New England Revolution	34	5	16	13	38	58	−20	28	
18	Vancouver Whitecaps FC	34	6	18	10	35	55	−20	28	

Source: MLS
Rules for classification: 1) points; 2) head-to-head record; 3) goal difference; 4) number of goals scored
(C) MLS Cup champions; (S) Supporters' Shield winners; (U) U.S. Open Cup winners; (V) Canadian Championship winners

==== Results summary ====
Overall								Home						Away					
Pld	Pts	W	L	D	GF	GA	GD	W	L	D	GF	GA	GD	W	L	D	GF	GA	GD
34	28	6	18	10	35	55	−20	6	6	5	24	24	0	0	12	5	11	31	−20

Last updated: October 22, 2011
Source: MLSSoccer.com
Pld = Matches played; Pts = Points; W = Matches won; D = Matches drawn; L = Matches lost; GF = Goals for; GA = Goals against; GD = Goal difference

==== Results by round ====
Round	1	2	3	4	5	6	7	8	9	10	11	12	13	14	15	16	17	18	19	20	21	22	23	24	25	26	27	28	29	30	31	32	33	34
Ground	H	A	H	H	A	H	H	A	A	H	A	H	A	A	A	H	A	A	H	A	A	H	H	A	A	H	A	A	H	H	H	H	A	H
Result	W	L	D	D	L	D	L	L	D	D	L	D	D	L	D	W	L	L	L	L	D	L	W	L	L	W	D	L	L	L	W	W	L	L
Position	1	8	6	6	12	11	15	16	17	16	17	18	18	18	18	18	18	18	18	18	18	18	18	18	18	18	18	18	18	18	18	17	17	18

Updated to match(es) played on October 22, 2011. Source: MLS Results
A = Away; H = Home; W = Win; D = Draw; L = Loss

==== Match results ====
Schedule

Win Draw Loss

March 19 1	Vancouver	4–2	Toronto FC	Vancouver, British Columbia, Canada
15:30 PDT	Hassli 15', 72', (yellow card) 49'; Dunfield 26', (yellow card) 28'; Harris (yellow card) 40', (goal) 63'	Report	De Rosario 20'; Sturgin (yellow card) 32'; Gargan (yellow card) 44'; Santos 78'	Stadium: Empire Field; Attendance: 22,592; Referee: Paul Ward

March 26 2	Philadelphia	1–0	Vancouver	Chester, Pennsylvania, U.S.
13:00 PDT	Nakazawa (yellow card) 27'; Califf (yellow card) 31'; Mwanga (yellow card) 35'; Ruiz 77'	Report	Hassli (yellow card) 26' (yellow-red card) 57'; Khalfan (yellow card) 47'; Rochat (yellow card) 48'	Stadium: PPL Park; Attendance: 18,591; Referee: Yader Reyes

April 2 3	Vancouver	3–3	Kansas City	Vancouver, British Columbia, Canada
16:00 PDT	Harris 73'; Camilo 90+2', 90+3'	Report	Bunbury 45+1', 58', (yellow card) 88'; Kamara 62'; Harrington (yellow card) 64'; Diop (yellow card) 68'	Stadium: Empire Field; Attendance: 20,518; Referee: Silviu Petrescu

April 6 4	Vancouver	1–1	New England	Vancouver, British Columbia, Canada
19:00 PDT	Harris (yellow card) 6'; Camilo (yellow card) 25'; Koffie (red card) 44'; Hassli (yellow card) 49' (yellow-red card) 56', (goal) 56' (pen.)	Report	Stolica 90+3'	Stadium: Empire Field; Attendance: 19,294; Referee: Baldomero Toledo

April 10 5	Houston	3–1	Vancouver	Houston, Texas, U.S.
16:00 PDT	Weaver 37'; Boswell 42'; Bruin 76'	Report	Leathers (yellow card) 35'; Camilo 38'; Rochat (yellow card) 56'	Stadium: Robertson Stadium; Attendance: 12,047; Referee: Jair Marrufo

April 16 6	Vancouver	0–0	Chivas	Vancouver, British Columbia, Canada
16:00 PDT	Brovsky (yellow card) 55'; Hassli (yellow card) 64'; Boxall (yellow card) 87'	Report	LaBrocca (yellow card) 68'	Stadium: Empire Field; Attendance: 20,809; Referee: Jorge Gonzalez

April 23 7	Vancouver	1–2	Dallas	Vancouver, British Columbia, Canada
16:00 PDT	Rochat 25'; Hassli (yellow card) 80'	Report	Ihemelu (yellow card) 30'; John 53'; Jacobson (yellow card) 66'; Avila 83'	Stadium: Empire Field; Attendance: 21,000; Referee: Juan Guzman

April 30 8	Columbus	2–1	Vancouver	Columbus, Ohio, U.S.
16:00 PDT	Rentería 50' (pen.), 59'	Report	Leathers (yellow card) 37'; Janicki (yellow card) 57'; Salgado 69', (yellow card) 90+1'	Stadium: Columbus Crew Stadium; Attendance: 11,298; Referee: Terry Vaughn

May 7 9	Chicago	0–0	Vancouver	Bridgeview, Illinois, U.S.
17:30 PDT	Mikulic (yellow card) 4'; Chaves (yellow card) 60'; Paladini (yellow card) 76'; Husidic (yellow card) 83'	Report	Dunfield (yellow card) 25'; Chiumiento (yellow card) 60'	Stadium: Toyota Park; Attendance: 11,680; Referee: Andrew Chapin

May 11 10	Vancouver	1–1	San Jose	Vancouver, British Columbia, Canada
19:00 PDT	Dunfield (yellow card) 34'; Akloul (yellow card) 77'; Brovsky (yellow card) 86'; Nolly (yellow card) 86'; Chiumiento 90+1'	Report	Wondolowski 39'; Beitashour (yellow card) 90'	Stadium: Empire Field; Attendance: 15,608; Referee: Ricardo Salazar

May 14 11	New England	1–0	Vancouver	Foxborough, Massachusetts, U.S.
16:30 PDT	Joseph 49' (pen.); Boggs (yellow card) 62'; McCarthy (yellow card) 66'	Report	DeMerit (yellow card) 33'	Stadium: Gillette Stadium; Attendance: 14,186; Referee: Chris Penso

May 28 12	Vancouver	1–1	New York	Vancouver, British Columbia, Canada
16:00 PDT	Hassli 24' (pen.)	Report	Rodgers 34'; Ream (yellow card) 75'	Stadium: Empire Field; Attendance: 21,000; Referee: Mark Geiger

June 1 13	Chivas	1–1	Vancouver	Carson, California, U.S.
19:30 PDT	LaBrocca 46'; Estupinan (yellow card) 79'	Report	Camilo 48'; Hassli (red card) 66'; Akloul (yellow card) 86'	Stadium: The Home Depot Center; Attendance: 11,753; Referee: Ricardo Salazar

June 4 14	Salt Lake	2–0	Vancouver	Sandy, Utah, U.S.
18:00 PDT	Warner (yellow card) 30'; Alexandre 32'; Espíndola 79'	Report	DeMerit (yellow card) 15'; Koffie (yellow card) 66'	Stadium: Rio Tinto Stadium; Attendance: 15,174; Referee: Juan Guzman

June 11 15	Seattle	2–2	Vancouver	Seattle, Washington, U.S.
19:00 PDT	Alonso (yellow card) 46'; Rosales 81'; Alonso 84'	Report	Rochat (yellow card) 46'; Camilo (yellow card) 55'; Leathers (yellow card) 71'; Hassli 29' (pen.), 85'	Stadium: Qwest Field; Attendance: 36,502; Referee: Mark Geiger

June 18 16	Vancouver	1–0	Philadelphia	Vancouver, British Columbia, Canada
16:00 PDT	Rochat 12'; Dunfield (yellow card) 22'	Report	Valdés (yellow card) 36'; Carroll (yellow card) 52'	Stadium: Empire Field; Attendance: 20,168; Referee: Alex Prus

June 25 17	Kansas City	2–1	Vancouver	Kansas City, Kansas, U.S.
17:30 PDT	Bravo 33' (pen.); Cesar 40'; Kamara (yellow card) 89'	Report	Camilo 15'; Jay DeMerit (yellow card) 32'; Duckett (yellow card) 84'	Stadium: LIVESTRONG Sporting Park; Attendance: 18,467; Referee: Edvin Jurisevic

June 29 18	Toronto FC	1–0	Vancouver	Toronto, Ontario, Canada
16:30 PDT	Soolsma 54' (pen.); Plata (yellow card) 89'	Report	Boxall (yellow card) 27'	Stadium: BMO Field; Attendance: 19,816; Referee: Mark Geiger

July 6 19	Vancouver	0–1	Columbus	Vancouver, British Columbia, Canada
19:00 PDT	Koffie (yellow card) 7'; Camilo (yellow card) 23'; Salinas (red card) 78'	Report	Gehrig (yellow card) 74'; Marshall (yellow card) 85'; Cunningham 90'	Stadium: Empire Field; Attendance: 19,079; Referee: Chris Penso

July 9 20	Colorado	2–1	Vancouver	Commerce City, Colorado, U.S.
18:00 PDT	Casey 25'; Palguta 68'	Report	Harvey (yellow card) 68'; Camilo 77'	Stadium: Dick's Sporting Goods Park; Attendance: 13,058; Referee: Alex Prus

July 20 21	San Jose	2–2	Vancouver	Santa Clara, California, U.S.
19:00 PDT	Wondolowski 3', 54'; Ring (yellow card) 45'; Leitch (yellow card) 74'; Corrales (yellow card) 93'	Report	Brovsky (yellow card) 40'; Hassli 42', 61'	Stadium: Buck Shaw Stadium; Referee: Paul Ward

July 30 22	Vancouver	0–4	Los Angeles	Vancouver, British Columbia, Canada
16:30 PDT		Report	Donovan 61', 75' (pen.); Stephens (yellow card) 65'; Franklin 81'; Cristman 90'	Stadium: Empire Field; Attendance: 27,500; Referee: Baldomero Toledo

August 7 23	Vancouver	4–2	Chicago	Vancouver, British Columbia, Canada
16:00 PDT	Hassli 1', 72'; Harvey (yellow card) 4'; Koffie 24'; Rochat (yellow card) 33'; Camilo 48'	Report	Oduro 23', (yellow card) 26'; Pappa (yellow card) 53'; Pause (yellow card) 71'; Barouch 80'	Stadium: Empire Field; Attendance: 18,714; Referee: Chris Penso

August 13 24	D.C.	4–0	Vancouver	Washington, D.C., U.S.
16:30 PDT	McDonald (yellow card) 39'; Pontius 45+2', 70'; Najar 48'; Davies (yellow card) 60'; King 83'	Report	Camilo (yellow card) 15'; Boxall (yellow card) 45+1'	Stadium: RFK Stadium; Referee: Hilario Grajeda

August 20 25	Portland	2–1	Vancouver	Portland, Oregon, U.S.
19:00 PDT	Chará 2'; Alhassan (yellow card) 23'; Perlaza 33'	Report	Harvey (yellow card) 49'; Thorrington (yellow card) 73'; Camilo (yellow card) 86', (goal) 88'	Stadium: Jeld-Wen Field; Attendance: 18,627; Referee: Jair Marrufo

August 27 26	Vancouver	1–0	Houston	Vancouver, British Columbia, Canada
16:00 PDT	Chiumiento (yellow card) 57'; Salinas 86'	Report	Boswell (yellow card) 89'	Stadium: Empire Field; Attendance: 20,226; Referee: Niko Bratsis

September 10 27	New York	1–1	Vancouver	Harrison, New Jersey, U.S.
16:30 PDT	Márquez (yellow card) 31'; Solli (red card) 45+1'; Agudelo 68'; Henry (yellow card) 73'	Report	Chiumiento 23'	Stadium: Red Bull Arena; Referee: Terry Vaughn

September 17 28	Los Angeles	3–0	Vancouver	Carson, California, U.S.
19:30 PDT	Magee 40', 75'; Keane 64'	Report	Rochat (yellow card) 17'; Koffie (yellow card) 28'; Hassli (yellow card) 62'	Stadium: The Home Depot Center; Attendance: 22,959; Referee: Michael Kennedy

September 24 29	Vancouver	1–3	Seattle	Vancouver, British Columbia, Canada
16:30 PDT	Camilo 22'; DeMerit (yellow card) 32'; Hassli (yellow card) 70'	Report	Evans (yellow card) 30', (goal) 33' (pen.); Montero 63', 67'; Parke (yellow card) 77'	Stadium: Empire Field; Attendance: 21,000; Referee: Jair Marrufo

October 2 30	Vancouver	0–1	Portland	Vancouver, British Columbia, Canada
13:30 PDT	Hassli (yellow card) 53'	Report	Cooper 25'; Chará (yellow card) 42'; Chabala (yellow card) 63'; Marcelin (yellow card) 65'	Stadium: BC Place; Attendance: 21,000; Referee: Mark Geiger

October 6 31	Vancouver	3–0	Salt Lake	Vancouver, British Columbia, Canada
18:30 PDT	Brovsky (yellow card) 34'; Camilo 44' (pen.), 53' (pen.); Khalfan 88'	Report	Olave (yellow card) 42'; Warner (red card) 43'; Grabavoy (yellow card) 51'; Morales (yellow card) 64'	Stadium: BC Place; Attendance: 20,113; Referee: Chris Penso

October 12 32	Vancouver	2–1	D.C.	Vancouver, British Columbia, Canada
19:00 PDT	Camilo 1'; Rochat (yellow card) 24'; Tan 46'	Report	Kitchen (yellow card) 15'; Burch (yellow card) 38'; McDonald 57'	Stadium: BC Place; Attendance: 17,288; Referee: Hilaro Grajeda

October 15 33	Dallas	2–0	Vancouver	Frisco, Texas, U.S.
17:30 PDT	Chávez 35', (yellow card) 38'; Shea 54'; Jackson 54'	Report		Stadium: Pizza Hut Park; Attendance: 10,222; Referee: Alex Prus

October 22 34	Vancouver	1–2	Colorado	Vancouver, British Columbia, Canada
16:00 PDT	Rochat 49'	Report	Larentowicz (yellow card) 10', (goal) 59'; Marshall (yellow card) 77'; Thompson 84'	Stadium: BC Place; Attendance: 21,000; Referee: Baldomero Toledo

=== Nutrilite Canadian championship ===
The club participates in the Canadian Championship. The champion of the tournament qualifies for the preliminary round of the 2011–12 CONCACAF Champions League.

For the first time in the tournament's history, a playoff format was used as opposed to a round robin format. The tournament seeding was based on the results of the 2010 edition of the tournament, with Vancouver being seeded second. In their semi-final playoff with the Montreal Impact, the Whitecaps won the opening leg in Montreal 1–0 on a goal by Terry Dunfield. The second leg was contested in Vancouver, where Montreal led 1–0 after full-time, for an aggregate score of 1–1. Because both teams had scored one away goal, extra time was needed to determine the aggregate winner. In extra time, Mouloud Akloul scored on a rebound following an Alain Rochat free kick to send the Whitecaps to the final versus Toronto FC.

==== Semi-finals ====
April 27, 2011 First leg	Montreal	0–1	Vancouver	Montreal, Quebec
	Hatchi (yellow card) 62'	Report	Dunfield 67'	Stadium: Stade Saputo; Attendance: 8,412; Referee: Carole Anne Chénard

May 4, 2011 Second leg	Vancouver	1–1 (a.e.t.) (2–1 agg.)	Montreal	Vancouver, British Columbia
	Akloul 113'	Report	Hatchi (yellow card) 26'; Lowery (yellow card) 30'; Tsiskaridze (yellow card) 59'; Gerba 83' (pen.), (yellow card) 100'	Stadium: Empire Field; Attendance: 16,611; Referee: Dave Gantar

==== Finals ====
May 18, 2011 First leg	Vancouver	1–1	Toronto FC	Vancouver, British Columbia
	Hassli 64'; Koffie (yellow card) 68'; Dunfield (yellow card) 77'	Report	Williams (yellow card) 52'; Santos 73'	Stadium: Empire Field; Attendance: 15,474; Referee: Silviu Petrescu

May 25, 2011 Second leg	Toronto FC	Abandoned	Vancouver	Toronto, Ontario
		Report	Hassli 17'	Stadium: BMO Field
Note: Match was abandoned in the 60th minute due to severe weather.

July 2, 2011 Second leg replay	Toronto FC	2–1 (3–2 agg.)	Vancouver	Toronto, Ontario
	Plata 51' (pen.); Yourassowsky 61'; Martina (yellow card) 56'	Report	Camilo 21'; Hassli (yellow card) 50'; Teibert (yellow card) 72'	Stadium: BMO Field; Attendance: 15,474

=== World Football Challenge ===
On April 14 it was announced that the Whitecaps would host Manchester City as part of the 2011 World Football Challenge.

July 18, 2011	Vancouver Whitecaps FC	1–2	Manchester City	Vancouver, British Columbia, Canada
	Camilo 30'	Report	Guidetti 68'; Wright-Phillips 84'	Stadium: Empire Field; Attendance: 24,074

=== Cascadia Cup ===
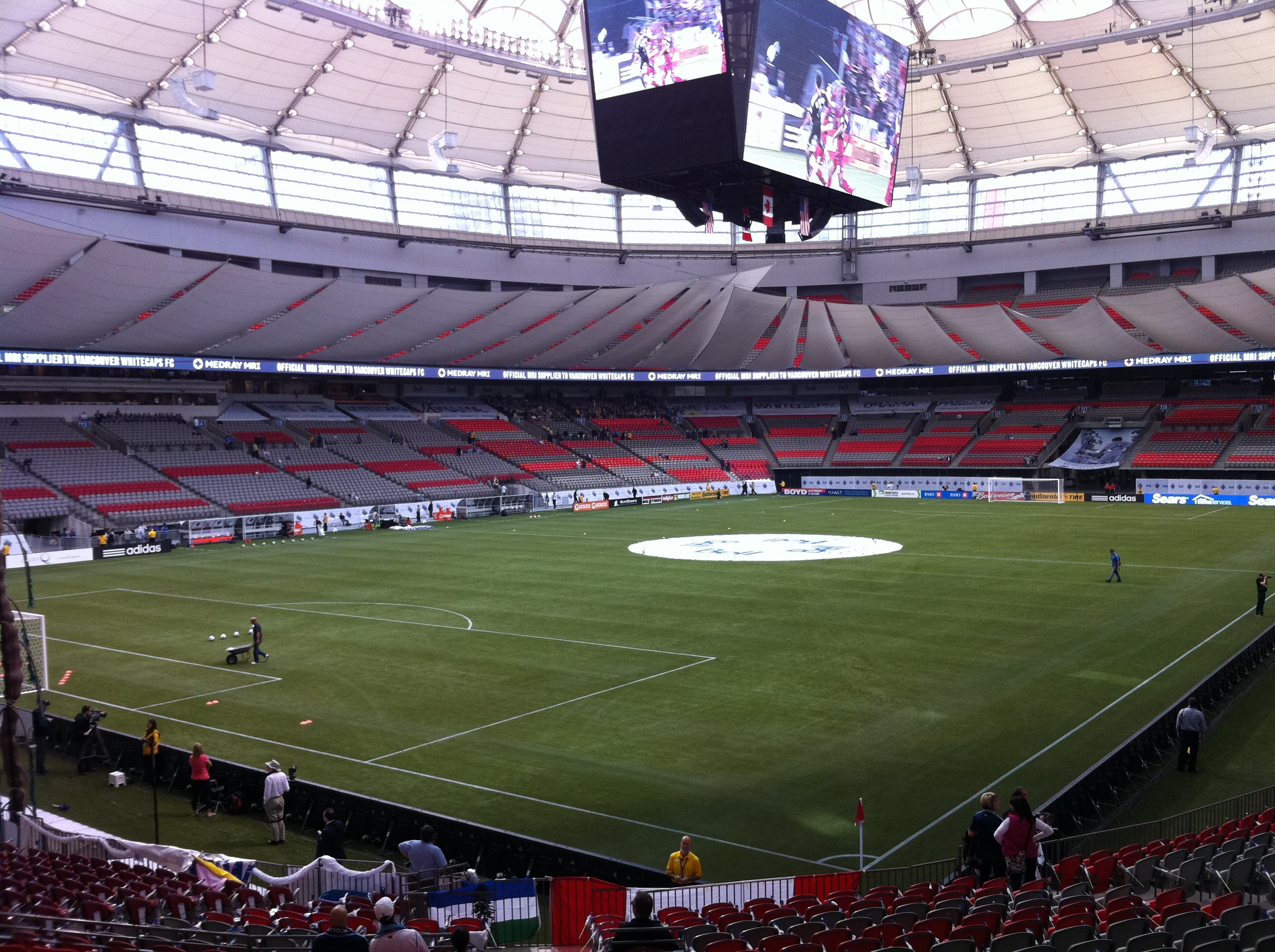
Vancouver Whitecaps FC debut at BC Place on October 2 against Cascadia rivals and expansion cousins, Portland Timbers.

The Whitecaps have had a long-standing rivalry with the Pacific Northwest clubs Seattle Sounders FC and Portland Timbers, dating back to the 1970s when ancestry clubs of the same name played in the original and now-defunct North American Soccer League. The tri-member tournament will continue with the expansion of the Whitecaps and the Timbers. The winner is determined through league matches between the sides, and the club with the best record against both sides wins the trophy.

The Cascadia Cup was awarded to the Seattle Sounders on September 24 when the Sounders defeated the Whitecaps 3–1 at Empire Field. Vancouver finished in third place after losing to Portland on October 2.

== Recognition ==
=== MLS Player of the Week ===
Week	Player	Week's Statline
Week 3	(Brazil) Camilo	2G (90'+2', 90'+3')

=== MLS Goal of the Week ===
Week	Player	Goal	Report
2	(France) Eric Hassli	85'	GOTW

=== MLS Team of the Week ===
Week	Player/Manager	Position	Report
1	(Switzerland) Davide Chiumiento	MF	MLS Team of the Week: 1
1	(France) Eric Hassli	FW	MLS Team of the Week: 1
2	(Switzerland) Alain Rochat	DF	MLS Team of the Week: 2
3	(Brazil) Camilo	FW	MLS Team of the Week: 3
4	(Tanzania) Nizar Khalfan	MF	MLS Team of the Week: 4
13	(France) Eric Hassli	FW	MLS Team of the Week: 13
14	(Switzerland) Alain Rochat	DF	MLS Team of the Week: 14
14	(Switzerland) Davide Chiumiento	MF	MLS Team of the Week: 14
14	(France) Eric Hassli	FW	MLS Team of the Week: 14
19	(United States) Shea Salinas	MF	MLS Team of the Week: 19
21	(France) Eric Hassli	FW	MLS Team of the Week: 21
24	(Switzerland) Alain Rochat	DF	MLS Team of the Week: 24
24	(Ghana) Gershon Koffie	MF	MLS Team of the Week: 24
24	(United States) Joe Cannon	GK	MLS Team of the Week: 24
26	(Ghana) Gershon Koffie	MF	MLS Team of the Week: 26

=== MLS All-Stars 2011 ===
Position	Player	Note
FW	(France) Eric Hassli	Inactive roster

== Miscellany ==
=== Allocation ranking ===
Vancouver is in the No. 13 position in the MLS Allocation Ranking. The allocation ranking is the mechanism used to determine which MLS club has first priority to acquire a U.S. National Team player who signs with MLS after playing abroad, or a former MLS player who returns to the league after having gone to a club abroad for a transfer fee. Vancouver started 2011 ranked No. 1 on the allocation list and used its ranking to acquire Jay DeMerit. A ranking can be traded, provided that part of the compensation received in return is another club's ranking.

=== International roster spots ===
Vancouver has 10 international roster spots. Each club in Major League Soccer is allocated 8 international roster spots, which can be traded. Vancouver acquired its first additional spot from Chivas USA on November 24, 2010, for use in the 2011 season only. On the same day Vancouver acquired a second additional spot from Colorado Rapids. Press reports did not indicate when, or if, this spot returns to Colorado. There is no limit on the number of international slots on each club's roster. The remaining roster slots must belong to domestic players. For clubs based in Canada, a domestic player is either a player with the legal right to work in Canada (i.e., Canadian citizen, permanent resident, part of a protected class) or a U.S. citizen, a permanent U.S. resident (green card holder) or the holder of other special U.S. status (e.g., refugee or asylum status).

=== Future draft pick trades ===
Future picks acquired: None, but Vancouver has acquired undisclosed future considerations from Toronto FC which may or may not include draft pick(s).

Future picks traded: None.
