= 2010 Vancouver Whitecaps FC season =

Vancouver Whitecaps FC 2010 soccer season

Vancouver Whitecaps FC
2010 season
- Chairman: Greg Kerfoot
- Head coach: Teitur Thordarson
- USSF Division-2: 2nd
- D2 Playoffs: Semifinals
- Canadian Championship: Runners-Up
- Highest home attendance: 5435; Oct. 2 v Portland
- Lowest home attendance: 4815; Apr. 24 v St. Louis
- Average home league attendance: 5152
Home colours	Away colours

The 2010 Vancouver Whitecaps FC season was the club's 35th year of existence, as well as their 24th and final year as a second-tier club. Following the end of the season, the Whitecaps FC joined MLS, becoming the second Canadian club to enter the league.

== Schedule and results ==
Win Draw Loss

=== Pre-season ===
2010-02-11	Vancouver Whitecaps FC	2–3	Seattle Sounders FC	Casa Grande, Arizona
10:30		@WhitecapsFC.com		Stadium: Grande Sports World

2010-02-15	Vancouver Whitecaps FC	1–4	Chicago Fire S.C.	Arizona State University Soccer Stadium
13:00		@WhitecapsFC.com

2010-02-20	Vancouver Whitecaps FC	2–1	Real Salt Lake	Casa Grande, Arizona
15:00		@WhitecapsFC.com		Stadium: Grande Sports World

2010-03-06	Seattle Sounders FC	0–0	Vancouver Whitecaps FC	Burnaby, BC
16:00		@WhitecapsFC.com		Stadium: Swangard Stadium

2010-03-20	Vancouver Whitecaps FC	5–0	UVic Vikes	Victoria, BC
14:00		@WhitecapsFC.com		Stadium: Centennial Stadium

2010-03-26	Vancouver Whitecaps FC	0–2	Portland Timbers	Tukwila, Washington
10:30		@WhitecapsFC.com		Stadium: Starfire Sports Complex

2010-03-31	Vancouver Whitecaps FC	1–0	BC CIS Selects	Vancouver, BC
17:30		@WhitecapsFC.com		Stadium: UBC Thunderbird Park

=== USSF Division 2 Professional League ===
2010-04-11	Vancouver Whitecaps FC	2–0	NSC Minnesota Stars	Burnaby, BC
16:00	Bellisomo 62'; James 67'	report		Stadium: Swangard Stadium; Attendance: 4934

2010-04-17	Miami FC	0–0	Vancouver Whitecaps FC	Fort Lauderdale, Florida
19:00		report		Stadium: Lockhart Stadium; Attendance: 1089

2010-04-24	Vancouver Whitecaps FC	1–0	AC St. Louis	Burnaby, BC
16:00	Akloul 19'	report		Stadium: Swangard Stadium; Attendance: 4815

2010-04-29	Portland Timbers	2–1	Vancouver Whitecaps FC	Portland, Oregon
19:00	Pore 7' 86'	report	Akwari 11'	Stadium: PGE Park; Attendance: 5808

2010-05-08	Vancouver Whitecaps FC	0–0	Crystal Palace Baltimore	Burnaby, BC
19:00		report		Stadium: Swangard Stadium; Attendance: 4903

2010-05-15	Vancouver Whitecaps FC	0–0	Montreal Impact	Burnaby, BC
19:30		report		Stadium: Swangard Stadium; Attendance: 5177

2010-05-22	Vancouver Whitecaps FC	2–0	Rochester Rhinos	Burnaby, BC
19:00	Stewart 17'; Janicki 51'	report		Stadium: Swangard Stadium; Attendance: 4996

2010-05-29	Rochester Rhinos	2–1	Vancouver Whitecaps FC	Rochester, New York
16:00	Pitchkolan 74'; Hamilton 84'	report	Sanchez 90+'	Stadium: Marina Auto Stadium; Attendance: 7744

2010-06-06	Vancouver Whitecaps FC	1–0	FC Tampa Bay Rowdies	Burnaby, BC
16:00	Nash 45' (pen.)	report		Stadium: Swangard Stadium; Attendance: 5288

2010-06-09	Vancouver Whitecaps FC	1–1	Carolina RailHawks FC	Burnaby, BC
19:30	A. Toure 31'	report	Barbara 45+' (pen.)	Stadium: Swangard Stadium; Attendance: 4941

2010-06-12	Austin Aztex FC	1–2	Vancouver Whitecaps FC	Austin, Texas
17:30	Olum 45+'	report	Haber 68'; Khalfan 82'	Stadium: House Park; Attendance: 2841

2010-06-16	Puerto Rico Islanders	1–1	Vancouver Whitecaps FC	Bayamón, Puerto Rico
17:00	A. Toure 10'	report	Foley 32'	Stadium: Juan Ramón Loubriel Stadium; Attendance: 2122

2010-06-26	AC St. Louis	0–0	Vancouver Whitecaps FC	Fenton, Missouri
17:00		report		Stadium: Anheuser-Busch Soccer Park; Attendance: 2432

2010-06-30	Montreal Impact	1–2	Vancouver Whitecaps FC	Montreal, Quebec
16:30	Donatelli 3'	report	Janicki 66'; Bellisomo 90'	Stadium: Saputo Stadium; Attendance: 11,949

2010-07-03	Portland Timbers	0–0	Vancouver Whitecaps FC	Portland, Oregon
19:00		report		Stadium: PGE Park; Attendance: 9017

2010-07-08	Vancouver Whitecaps FC	1–1	AC St. Louis	Burnaby, BC
19:30	Edwini-Bonsu 87'	report	Bloom 72'	Stadium: Swangard Stadium; Attendance: 5185

2010-07-14	Vancouver Whitecaps FC	3–1	Miami FC	Burnaby, BC
19:30	Wagner 18' 56' 90+2'	report	Shriver 57'	Stadium: Swangard Stadium; Attendance: 5024

2010-07-22	Vancouver Whitecaps FC	1–2	Portland Timbers	Burnaby, BC
19:30	Khalfan 51'	report	Pore 66'; Danso 72'	Stadium: Swangard Stadium; Attendance: 5387

2010-07-25	Vancouver Whitecaps FC	1–1	NSC Minnesota Stars	Burnaby, BC
19:00	Nash 67'	report	Bracalello 28'	Stadium: Swangard Stadium; Attendance: 5288

2010-07-28	Montreal Impact	0–1	Vancouver Whitecaps FC	Montreal, Quebec
16:30		report	Janicki 88'	Stadium: Saputo Stadium; Attendance: 12,355

2010-07-31	Carolina RailHawks FC	2–2	Vancouver Whitecaps FC	Cary, North Carolina
16:00	Schulte 40'; Gardner 45'	report	Nash 2' (pen.); Davies 15'	Stadium: WakeMed Soccer Park; Attendance: 2285

2010-08-06	AC St. Louis	0–0	Vancouver Whitecaps FC	Fenton, Missouri
17:00		report		Stadium: Anheuser-Busch Soccer Park; Attendance: 2312

2010-08-14	NSC Minnesota Stars	0–1	Vancouver Whitecaps FC	Blaine, Minnesota
17:00		report	Nash 15'	Stadium: National Sports Center; Attendance: 1010

2010-08-21	FC Tampa Bay Rowdies	1–1	Vancouver Whitecaps FC	Tampa, Florida
16:30	Wagner 7'	report	King 28'	Stadium: George M. Steinbrenner Field; Attendance: 2562

2010-08-29	Vancouver Whitecaps FC	2–2	Austin Aztex FC	Burnaby, BC
16:00	Stewart 16'; Mobulu 52'	report	Griffan 44'; Johnson 80'	Stadium: Swangard Stadium; Attendance: 5288

2010-09-05	Vancouver Whitecaps FC	0–0	Puerto Rico Islanders	Burnaby, BC
16:00		report		Stadium: Swangard Stadium; Attendance: 5288

2010-09-11	Crystal Palace Baltimore	0–3	Vancouver Whitecaps FC	Towson, Maryland
17:00		report	Janicki 45+'; Edwini-Bonsu 70'; Dunfield 76'	Stadium: Paul Angelo Russo Stadium; Attendance: 1150

2010-09-18	NSC Minnesota Stars	1–0	Vancouver Whitecaps FC	Blaine, Minnesota
17:00	Deldo 49'	report		Stadium: National Sports Center

2010-09-24	Vancouver Whitecaps FC	0–1	Montreal Impact	Burnaby, BC
19:45		report	Sebrango 29'	Stadium: Swangard Stadium; Attendance: 5288

2010-10-02	Vancouver Whitecaps FC	2–2	Portland Timbers	Burnaby, BC
16:00	Dunfield 27'; Arnoux 68'	report	Alhassan 46'; Dike 56'	Stadium: Swangard Stadium; Attendance: 5435

==== Post-season ====
2010-10-07 Playoffs QF1	Vancouver Whitecaps FC	2–0	Portland Timbers	Burnaby, BC
19:30	Koffie 1'; Nash 13' (pen.)	report		Stadium: Swangard Stadium; Attendance: 5018; Referee: Mathieu Bourdeau

2010-10-10 Playoffs QF2	Portland Timbers	1–0 (1–2 agg.)	Vancouver Whitecaps FC	Portland, Oregon
18:00	Marcelin 49'	report		Stadium: Merlo Field; Attendance: 4884; Referee: Fotis Bazakos

2010-10-14 Playoffs SF1	Puerto Rico Islanders	0–0	Vancouver Whitecaps FC	Bayamón, Puerto Rico
17:05		report		Stadium: Bayamón Soccer Complex; Attendance: 2831

2010-10-17 Playoffs SF2	Vancouver Whitecaps FC	0–2 (a.e.t.) (0–2 agg.)	Puerto Rico Islanders	Burnaby, BC
4:00PM PDT		report	Nicholas Addlery 113', 120'	Stadium: Swangard Stadium; Attendance: 5325

=== Nutrilite Canadian Championship ===
2010-05-05	Vancouver Whitecaps FC	1–1	Montreal Impact	Burnaby, BC
19:00	Haber 81' (pen.)	report	Byers 31'	Stadium: Swangard Stadium; Attendance: 4325

2010-05-19	Vancouver Whitecaps FC	0–0	Toronto FC	Burnaby, BC
19:00		report		Stadium: Swangard Stadium; Attendance: 4928

May 26, 2010	Montreal Impact	1–1	Vancouver Whitecaps	Montreal, Quebec
20:00 EDT	Billy 62'	report	A. Toure 50'	Stadium: Stade Saputo; Attendance: 10,959

2010-06-02	Toronto FC	0–0	Vancouver Whitecaps FC	Toronto, Ontario
20:00				Stadium: BMO Field; Attendance: 15,176

== Conference table ==
NASL Conference
Pos	Team	Pld	W	L	T	GF	GA	GD	Pts	Qualification
1	Carolina RailHawks FC	30	13	9	8	44	32	+12	47	Conference leader, qualified for playoffs
2	Vancouver Whitecaps FC	30	10	5	15	32	22	+10	45	Qualified for playoffs (Note: The remaining six teams with the highest point totals, regardless of conference, also advance to the playoffs.)
3	Montreal Impact	30	12	11	7	36	30	+6	43	Qualified for playoffs
4	Miami FC	30	7	11	12	37	49	−12	33	
5	AC St. Louis	30	7	15	8	32	48	−16	29	
6	Crystal Palace Baltimore	30	6	18	6	24	55	−31	24	

Source: USSF D-2 schedule table

== Canadian Championship table ==
Pos	Team	Pld	W	D	L	GF	GA	GD	Pts	Qualification	TOR	VAN	MTL
1	Toronto FC (C)	4	2	2	0	3	0	+3	8	Champions League	—	0–0	2–0
2	Vancouver Whitecaps	4	0	4	0	2	2	0	4		0–0	—	1–1
3	Montreal Impact	4	0	2	2	2	5	−3	2		0–1	1–1	—

Source: Canada Soccer
(C) Champions

== Roster ==
as of the end of the season.

Note: Flags indicate national team as defined under FIFA eligibility rules; some limited exceptions apply. Players may hold more than one non-FIFA nationality.

No.	Pos.	Nation	Player
1	GK	USA	Jay Nolly
2	DF	USA	Nelson Akwari
3	DF	CAN	Luca Bellisomo
4	DF	CAN	Chris Williams
6	MF	CAN	Terry Dunfield
7	MF	CAN	Martin Nash (captain)
8	DF	USA	Wes Knight
9	MF	SUI	Davide Chiumiento
11	FW	COD	Ridge Mobulu
12	MF	CAN	Russell Teibert
13	MF	CAN	Alex Elliott
14	DF	USA	Greg Janicki
15	MF	CAN	Philippe Davies
16	MF	CAN	Kyle Porter
17	FW	CAN	Randy Edwini-Bonsu
18	FW	CAN	La'Vere Corbin-Ong

No.	Pos.	Nation	Player
19	FW	CRC	Jonathan McDonald
20	MF	CAN	Ethan Gage
22	MF	JPN	Takashi Hirano
23	DF	USA	Blake Wagner
24	MF	CMR	Alexandre Morfaw
25	FW	USA	Cody Arnoux
26	FW	CAN	Alex Semenets
27	GK	CAN	Dan Pelc
28	MF	GHA	Gershon Koffie
29	MF	TAN	Nizar Khalfan
31	GK	CAN	Simon Thomas
33	DF	LBR	Willis Forko
39	FW	VIN	Cornelius Stewart
55	DF	FRA	Mouloud Akloul
77	DF	GEO	Zourab Tsiskaridze

== Starting 11 ==
Last updated on 17 October 2010.
(These are the most used starting active players in the most used formation throughout the complete season)

No.	Pos.	Name	Starts
1	GK	(United States) Jay Nolly	33
8	RB	(United States) Wes Knight	29
2	CB	(Canada) Luca Bellisomo	31
14	CB	(United States) Greg Janicki	29
77	LB	(Georgia (country)) Zourab Tsiskaridze	21
15	RM	(Canada) Philippe Davies	25
7	CM	(Canada) Martin Nash	31
3	CM	(Canada) Terry Dunfield	10
23	LM	(United States) Blake Wagner	17
39	FW	(Democratic Republic of the Congo) Ridge Mobulu	6
29	FW	(Canada) Randy Edwini-Bonsu	5

== Transactions ==
(As of End of 2009 season to Present)

October 2009

OUT

POS	Nationality	Player	New Team
FW	(Canada)	Charles Gbeke	Released (Guangzhou F.C.)
MF	(Bolivia)	Vicente Arze	Released (Free Agent)
FW	(United States)	Lyle Martin	Released (Shaanxi Chan-Ba)
GK	(Brazil)	Diego	Released (Hollywood United Hitmen)
DF	(Nigeria)	Michael Ndubuisi Onwatuegwu	Released (Persiba Bantul)
DF	(Canada)	Marco Reda	Released (Free Agent)
FW	(United States)	Aaron Wheeler	Released (FC Tampa Bay)
DF	(Canada)	Geordie Lyall	Retired

November 2009

IN

POS	Nationality	Player	
DF	(Canada)	Chris Williams	Signed (Charleston Battery)
MF	(Mexico)	Ricardo Sanchez	Signed (Minnesota Thunder)

OUT

POS	Nationality	Player	
MF	(Bermuda)	Tyrell Burgess	Released (Bermuda Hogges)
MF	(Haiti)	Kenold Versailles	Released (Rochester Rhinos)

December 2009

IN

POS	Nationality	Player	
DF	(Georgia (country))	Zourab Tsiskaridze	Signed (Miami FC)
MF	(Northern Ireland)	Jonny Steele	Signed (Puerto Rico Islanders)
DF	(United States)	Greg Janicki	Signed (D.C. United)

January 2010

IN

POS	Nationality	Player	
DF	(United States)	Nelson Akwari	Signed (Charleston Battery)

OUT

POS	Nationality	Player	
FW	(Canada)	Marcus Haber	Transferred (West Bromwich Albion)

February 2010

IN

POS	Nationality	Player	
MF	(United States)	Blake Wagner	Signed (FC Dallas)

OUT

POS	Nationality	Player	
DF	(Canada)	Mason Trafford	Released (Real Maryland Monarchs)
MF	(Canada)	Gordon Chin	Released (Free Agent)

April 2010

IN

POS	Nationality	Player	
DF	(France)	Mouloud Akloul	Signed (Al-Ittihad Kalba)
GK	(Canada)	Dan Pelc	Signed (Serbian White Eagles)
FW	(Canada)	Marcus Haber	On Loan (West Bromwich Albion)

June 2010

IN

POS	Nationality	Player	
MF	(Canada)	Alex Elliot	Signed (FSV Mainz 05)

OUT

POS	Nationality	Player	
FW	(Canada)	Marcus Haber	Loan Return (West Bromwich Albion)

July 2010

IN

POS	Nationality	Player	
FW	(Democratic Republic of the Congo)	Ridge Mobulu	Signed (Lausanne Sport)

OUT

POS	Nationality	Player	
MF	(United States)	Justin Moose	Released (Free Agent)
MF	(Mexico)	Ricardo Sanchez	Traded: FC Tampa Bay
MF	(Northern Ireland)	Jonny Steele	Traded: FC Tampa Bay
FW	(Jamaica)	Dever Orgill	Released (St. George's SC)

August 2010

IN

POS	Nationality	Player	
FW	(Costa Rica)	Jonathan McDonald	Signed (Club Sport Herediano)
MF	(Cameroon)	Alexandre Morfaw	Signed (Bodens BK)
MF	(Canada)	Terry Dunfield	Signed (Shrewsbury Town)
MF	(Canada)	Kyle Porter	Signed (Energie Cottbus)
DF	(Switzerland)	Alain Rochat	Signed (FC Zurich)
MF	(Switzerland)	Davide Chiumiento	Signed (Lucerne)
FW	(United States)	Cody Arnoux	Signed (Everton)
DF	(Liberia)	Willis Forko	Signed (FK Bodø/Glimt)
DF	(Ghana)	Gershon Koffie	Signed (International Allies FC)

OUT

POS	Nationality	Player	
FW	(Saint Vincent and the Grenadines)	Marlon James	Released (Free Agent)
DF	(Switzerland)	Alain Rochat	Loaned to FC Zurich
MF	(Liberia)	Ansu Toure	Released (Free Agent)

September 2010

OUT

POS	Nationality	Player	
DF	(Japan)	Takashi Hirano	assigned to Vancouver Whitecaps Residency
MF	(Tanzania)	Nizar Khalfan	assigned to Vancouver Whitecaps Residency
FW	(Saint Vincent and the Grenadines)	Cornelius Stewart	assigned to Vancouver Whitecaps Residency
FW	(Mauritania)	Doudou Touré	assigned to Vancouver Whitecaps Residency
