= RNO =

RNO may refer to:

- RedNation Online, Canadian soccer website
- Renault, French automobile company
- Reno-Tahoe International Airport, in Washoe County, Nevada, United States
- Russian National Orchestra, residing in Moscow
- Knight of the Order of the Polar Star (Swedish: Riddare av Nordstjärneorden)

== See also ==
- R&O (disambiguation)
