= Red Nation (disambiguation) =

"Red Nation" is a 2011 song by The Game.

Red Nation may also refer to:

- Red Nation (Namibia), the main subtribe of the Nama people of Namibia
- Red Nation (magazine), Canadian online soccer magazine

== See also ==
- His Red Nation, or Little Crow (1810–1863), Dakota leader
