= Chris Williams (Canadian soccer) =

Canadian soccer player (born 1981)

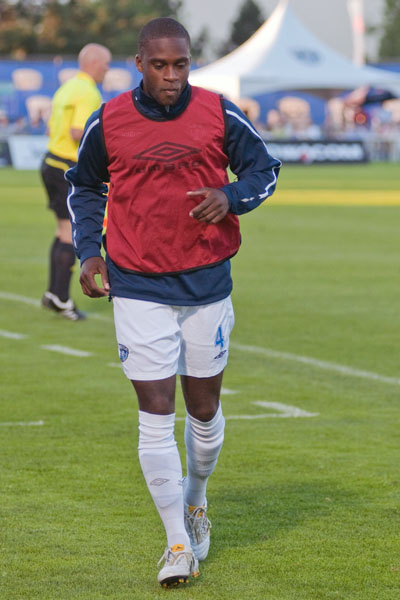
- Williams in 2010

Personal information
- Full name: Christopher Williams
- Date of birth: June 1, 1981 (age 45)
- Place of birth: Toronto, Ontario, Canada
- Height: 5 ft 10 in (1.78 m)
- Positions: Defender; defensive midfielder

Youth career
- 1999–2002: Mobile Rams

Senior career*
Years	Team	Apps	(Gls)
1999–2002	Glen Shields Sun Devils		
2003–2004	Montreal Impact	38	(0)
2005–2006	Toronto Lynx	39	(0)
2007	SK Kladno	2	(0)
2008–2009	Charleston Battery	48	(1)
2010	Vancouver Whitecaps	15	(0)

International career
2000–2001	Canada U-20	13	(0)
2003–2008	Canada	3	(0)
- * Club domestic league appearances and goals

Chris Williams (born June 1, 1981) is a Canadian former soccer player who played the majority of his career in the USL A-League. His most successful tenure was with Montreal Impact, where he won a USL A-League Championship, and a Voyageurs Cup. Williams also represented Canada at the international level with three appearances.

== Career ==
Williams began his career at the college level while playing with University of Mobile in Alabama where he took home First Team All-American honours in the 2002–03 season. In 1999, he signed with the Glen Shields Sun Devils of the Canadian Professional Soccer League, where he played for the organization for four seasons. During his tenure with the Sun Devils he received a trial with Werder Bremen of the Bundesliga in 2002. On December 18, 2002, he was drafted by the Toronto Lynx of the USL A-League. He would sign a contract with division rivals the Montreal Impact. During his time in Montreal, Williams became a regular on the team, helping Montreal to win their second A-League Championship and also the Voyageurs Cup in 2003 and 2004.

After the 2004 season, Williams returned to the Toronto Lynx as a free agent. He made his debut for the club on June 24, 2005, in a match against Minnesota Thunder. At the conclusion of the season the team awarded Williams with the Fan Favorite award. He returned to Toronto for the 2006 season. During the 2006 season he helped the club achieve a 10-game team record undefeated streak at home and reached the finals of the Open Canada Cup, but lost the match 2–0 against Ottawa St. Anthony Italia. For his involvement within the soccer community the club awarded him the Public Relations Award.

In January 2007, Williams went abroad to Europe to sign with SK Kladno in the Gambrinus Liga of the Czech Republic. He played alongside compatriot and former Toronto teammate Dave Simpson. He appeared in two matches for the club. In March 2008 he returned to North America to sign with Charleston Battery of the USL First Division. He made 48 appearances and scored 1 goal in his two seasons with the Battery

On November 12, 2009, Williams signed a contract with the Vancouver Whitecaps. He helped the Whitecaps finish second in their conference and clinched a postseason berth. On October 19, 2010, the Vancouver Whitecaps released Williams, along with five fellow players, citing their need to purge certain players in preparation for their upcoming promotion to Major League Soccer.

== International career ==
Williams played at the 2001 FIFA World Youth Championship in Argentina, alongside Atiba Hutchinson and Mike Klukowski among others.

He then earned his first senior national team cap on January 18, 2003, versus United States, where the match resulted in 4–0 victory for the States. He would later record his second cap five years later against Martinique, where the Canadians would claim the game by a score of 1–0. On November 19, 2008, Williams was called up again for a 2010 FIFA World Cup qualification match against Jamaica.

== Honours ==
- USL First Division Championship - 2004 (Montreal Impact)
- Voyageurs Cup - 2003, 2004 (Montreal Impact)

== Personal life ==
Born in Toronto but raised in nearby Scarborough, Williams is married to his Czech wife Darina and the couple have a son.

From 2012 to 2014, he was a contributor for RedNation Online where he provided analysis as a podcaster.
