= R&O =

R&O may refer to:

- Report and order or rulemaking, a process in administrative law
- Repair and Overhaul, fixing or performing routine actions to keep technical device in working order
- Resisting and Obstructing
- Rust and oxidation lubricant, a lubricant treated with rust and oxidation inhibitors

== See also ==
- RNO (disambiguation)
