= Russell Teibert =

Canadian soccer player (born 1992)

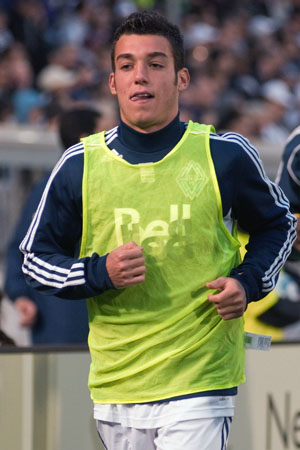
- Teibert with Vancouver Whitecaps FC in 2011

Personal information
- Full name: Russell James Teibert
- Date of birth: December 22, 1992 (age 33)
- Place of birth: Niagara Falls, Ontario, Canada
- Height: 5 ft 8 in (1.73 m)
- Position: Midfielder

Youth career
- Niagara Falls SC
- 2008: Toronto FC

Senior career*
Years	Team	Apps	(Gls)
2008–2010	Whitecaps Residency	26	(3)
2010	Vancouver Whitecaps	1	(0)
2011–2012	Vancouver Whitecaps FC U-23	2	(0)
2011–2023	Vancouver Whitecaps FC	253	(4)

International career^{‡}
2009	Canada U17	8	(3)
2010	Canada U20	4	(0)
2012	Canada U23	4	(0)
2012–2020	Canada	27	(2)
- * Club domestic league appearances and goals as of January 8, 2024 ‡ National team caps and goals as of January 10, 2020

Russell James Teibert (born December 22, 1992) is a Canadian former professional soccer player who played his entire career for Vancouver Whitecaps FC.

== Club career ==
=== Youth and amateur ===
Teibert attended St. Paul High School (Ontario) in Niagara Falls, Ontario, and is of German and Italian descent. He had a brief spell with Toronto FC's academy in the Canadian Soccer League's reserve division, before joining the Vancouver Whitecaps Residency program in 2008. He appeared in friendly games with the Residency team during tours of Japan, Germany and Spain, and played in the prestigious Dallas Cup against youth academies from Argentina's Club Atlético River Plate and Germany's Eintracht Frankfurt and Brazil's São Paulo FC.

Teibert also played with the Vancouver Whitecaps Residency team in the USL Premier Development League in 2009 and 2010.

=== Vancouver Whitecaps FC ===
Following the conclusion of the 2010 PDL season Teibert was called up to the Vancouver Whitecaps senior team. He made his professional debut on July 31, 2010 in a 2–2 tie with the Carolina RailHawks. In doing so, Teibert became the 10th youngest player to appear in a competitive match for the Whitecaps men's team at 17 years and 221 days.

The club moved to Major League Soccer for the 2011 season. Teibert had a successful preseason and signed with the MLS Vancouver Whitecaps FC on March 17, 2011. The league signed Teibert to a Generation Adidas contract which made his salary exempt from the league's salary cap for a period normally lasting 1–3 years. Teibert was also signed as a homegrown player from Vancouver's residency program, meaning he did not have to go through the MLS SuperDraft process.

He made his MLS debut on March 19, in Vancouver's 2011 MLS opener against Toronto FC. On May 11, 2013 Teibert scored his first two professional goals, both in the second half, against the LA Galaxy in a 3–1 Whitecaps victory. Teibert would play in a number of positions with the Whitecaps in his first few years; as a winger in 2011, as a fullback in 2012, again as a winger in 2013, and finally as a defensive midfielder when coach Carl Robinson took over in 2014. Teibert would serve as captain during the 2014 Canadian Championship, and would also play in the 2014 MLS Homegrown Game that same season. During the 2015 Canadian Championship, Teibert would win the George Gross Memorial Award as tournament MVP as the Whitecaps won the Voyageurs Cup for the first time in their history.

After appearing in 23 matches in 2015, Teibert struggled for playing time during the 2016 season, appearing in only 11 matches with 8 starts, despite earning praise from head coach Carl Robinson. In the 2017 MLS season, Teibert struggled again for playing time, and did not have his option exercised by the Whitecaps. However a few days later he re-signed with the club on a new three-year contract through the 2020 season. He scored his first goal in five years for Vancouver, netting the opener in a 2–1 victory over Toronto FC on October 6, 2018.

In July 2020, during his tenth year with the Whitecaps, Teibert signed a contract extension with the club through the 2023 season, with an option for 2024. In January 2024 it was confirmed that Teibert's contract would not be renewed, ending his time at the club after 301 appearances. On March 1, 2024, he announced his retirement from professional soccer, having spent 16 seasons with one club. Teibert will join the Whitecaps front office.

== International career ==
Teibert has represented Canada at U-17, and U-20 levels. He was selected in Canada's squad for the 2009 CONCACAF U-17 Championship, and scored a goal from the penalty spot in their 1–1 draw with Honduras on April 21, 2009. Teibert was awarded the Canadian U-17 Player of the Year award in both 2008 and 2009, he became the first player in history to win the honour twice.

Teibert earned his first cap for Canada's senior team August 15, 2012 in a friendly against Trinidad and Tobago. Teibert came on as a second-half substitute for Patrice Bernier, the game ended in a 2–0 victory. On June 27, 2013 Teibert was listed as a part of the confirmed 23-man squad for Colin Miller's Canada squad for 2013 CONCACAF Gold Cup.

After almost a year in between call-ups, in which rumours circulated of a row between player and coach, Teibert was recalled by Benito Floro on November 6, 2014 for a friendly against Panama. Teibert scored his first international goal off a penalty kick in a 2018 FIFA World Cup qualifier against Dominica on June 11, 2015. On June 22, Teibert was named to Canada's squad for the 2015 CONCACAF Gold Cup.

Teibert continued to feature under new Canada coach Octavio Zambrano, appearing in Zambrano's first match in charge against Curaçao on June 13, 2017 and being named to Canada's squad at the 2017 CONCACAF Gold Cup on June 27.

In May 2019 Teibert was named to the 23-man squad for the 2019 CONCACAF Gold Cup.

== Career statistics ==
=== Club ===
As of match played September 16, 2023

Appearances and goals by club, season and competition
Club	Season	League			Playoffs		National cup		Continental		Other		Total	
Club	Season	Division	Apps	Goals	Apps	Goals	Apps	Goals	Apps	Goals	Apps	Goals	Apps	Goals
Vancouver Whitecaps (NASL)	2010	USSF Division 2	1	0	—		—		—		—		1	0
Vancouver Whitecaps FC	2011	MLS	11	0	—		4	0	—		—		15	0
Vancouver Whitecaps FC	2012	MLS	4	0	0	0	0	0	—		—		4	0
Vancouver Whitecaps FC	2013	MLS	24	2	—		4	0	—		—		28	2
Vancouver Whitecaps FC	2014	MLS	29	0	0	0	2	0	—		—		31	0
Vancouver Whitecaps FC	2015	MLS	23	0	1	0	3	0	3 (Note: Appearances in CONCACAF Champions League)	0	—		30	0
Vancouver Whitecaps FC	2016	MLS	11	0	—		4	0	2	0	—		17	0
Vancouver Whitecaps FC	2017	MLS	12	0	0	0	2	0	2	0	—		16	0
Vancouver Whitecaps FC	2018	MLS	23	1	—		4	0	—		—		27	1
Vancouver Whitecaps FC	2019	MLS	27	0	—		1	0	—		—		28	0
Vancouver Whitecaps FC	2020	MLS	20 (Note: Includes three appearances in MLS is Back Tournament group stage)	0	—		0	0	—		1 (Note: Appearance in MLS is Back Tournament knockout stage)	0	21	0
Vancouver Whitecaps FC	2021	MLS	33	1	1	0	1	0	—		—		35	1
Vancouver Whitecaps FC	2022	MLS	29	0	—		4	1	—		—		33	1
Vancouver Whitecaps FC	2023	MLS	7	0	0	0	3	0	3	0	2 (Note: Appearances in Leagues Cup)	0	15	0
Vancouver Whitecaps FC	Total		253	4	2	0	32	1	10	0	3	0	300	5
Career total			254	4	2	0	32	1	10	0	3	0	301	5

=== International ===
As of match played January 16, 2020

Appearances and goals by national team and year
National team	Year	Apps	Goals
Canada	2012	1	0
Canada	2013	6	0
Canada	2014	1	0
Canada	2015	9	1
Canada	2016	0	0
Canada	2017	3	0
Canada	2018	2	0
Canada	2019	3	0
Canada	2020	2	1
Total		27	2

Scores and results list Canada's goal tally first, score column indicates score after each Teibert goal.

List of international goals scored by Russell Teibert
No.	Date	Venue	Opponent	Score	Result	Competition
1	June 11, 2015	Windsor Park, Roseau, Dominica	Dominica	2–0	2–0	2018 FIFA World Cup qualification
2	January 10, 2020	Championship Soccer Stadium, Irvine, United States	Barbados	2–0	4–1	Friendly

== Honours ==
Vancouver Whitecaps

- Canadian Championship: 2015, 2022, 2023

Individual

- Canadian U-17 Player of the Year: 2008, 2009
- George Gross Memorial Trophy: 2015

== See also ==
- List of one-club men in association football
