= Mustapha Jarju =

Gambian footballer

Personal information
- Full name: Mustapha Alasan Jarju
- Date of birth: 18 July 1986 (age 40)
- Place of birth: Banjul, Gambia
- Height: 1.83 m (6 ft 0 in)
- Position: Forward

Youth career
- Reggae Boys
- Steve Biko Bakau
- Racing Star
- Wallidan

Senior career*
Years	Team	Apps	(Gls)
2006–2008	Lierse	62	(23)
2008–2011	R.A.E.C. Mons	99	(34)
2011	Vancouver Whitecaps FC	10	(0)
2012–2014	R.A.E.C. Mons	68	(16)
2014–2015	Hatta Club	20	(15)
2015	Irtysh	0	(0)
2016–2017	Sporting Hasselt	42	(7)

International career
2002	Gambia U17		
2003–2005	Gambia U20		
2006–2013	Gambia	26	(5)
- * Club domestic league appearances and goals

Mustapha Alasan Jarju (born 18 July 1986), also known as Toubabo, is a Gambian former professional footballer who played as a forward.

== Club career ==
Mustapha Jarju began his career playing with Reggae Boys, Racing Star, Steve Biko FC and Wallidan in his native Gambia. Jarju would launch his international club career with Belgian club Lierse. In his two years at the club Jarju was a prominent member of the side scoring 24 goals in 62 matches.

As a result of his stellar play with Lierse, Jarju signed with R.A.E.C. Mons in 2008. While with Mons he appeared in 99 league matches and scored 34 goals. His best season with Mons was during the 2010/11 campaign in which he scored 18 goals in 31 league matches, helping the club gain promotion to the Belgian top flight. In total with the club Jarju appeared in 106 official matches and scored 37 goals.

He would become the first African to sign as a Designated Player in Major League Soccer after signing with the Vancouver Whitecaps FC on 12 July 2011. However, it was not a good fit for Jarju, with Vancouver mutually agreeing to terminate his contract on 20 January 2012.

Jarju re-signed with R.A.E.C. Mons on 25 January 2012.

In July 2015, Jarju signed for Kazakhstan Premier League side Irtysh Pavlodar. Jarju terminated his contract with Irtysh in September of the same year, without playing for the club, before filing a lawsuit against the club over unpaid wages and compensation.

== International career ==
The midfielder was previously the captain of the U-17 and U-20 national teams, as well as serving as alternate captain for Gambia and scoring a goal for the national squad versus Liberia in the 2010 World Cup qualification first round.

== Career statistics ==
Scores and results list Gambia's goal tally first.

No	Date	Venue	Opponent	Score	Result	Competition
1.	7 February 2007	Stade Alphonse Theis, Hesperange, Luxembourg	Luxembourg	1–0	1–2	Friendly
2.	1 June 2008	Samuel Kanyon Doe Sports Complex, Monrovia, Liberia	Liberia	1–0	1–1	2010 FIFA World Cup qualification
3.	14 June 2008	Independence Stadium, Bakau, Gambia	Algeria	1–0	1–0	2010 FIFA World Cup qualification
4.	7 September 2013	Independence Stadium, Bakau, Gambia	Tanzania	1–0	2–0	2014 FIFA World Cup qualification
5.	7 September 2013	Independence Stadium, Bakau, Gambia	Tanzania	2–0	2–0	2014 FIFA World Cup qualification
