= Davide Chiumiento =

Swiss footballer (born 1984)

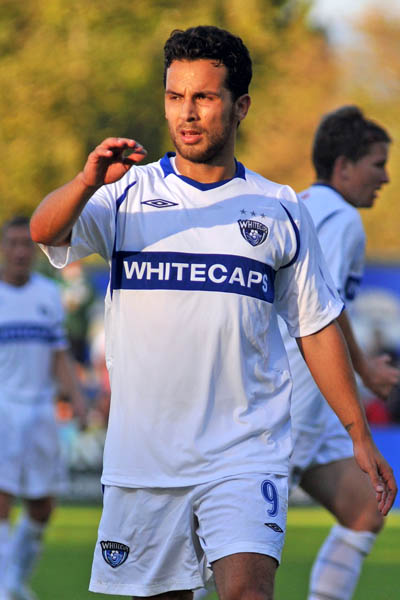

Personal information
- Full name: Davide Chiumiento
- Date of birth: 22 November 1984 (age 41)
- Place of birth: Heiden, Switzerland
- Height: 1.70 m (5 ft 7 in)
- Positions: Attacking midfielder; winger

Youth career
- 1993–1995: FC Heiden
- 1995–2000: St. Gallen
- 2000–2004: Juventus

Senior career*
| Years | Team | Apps | (Gls) |
| 2004–2007 | Juventus | 1 | (0) |
| 2004–2005 | → Siena (loan) | 14 | (1) |
| 2005–2006 | → Le Mans (loan) | 18 | (1) |
| 2006–2007 | → BSC Young Boys (loan) | 17 | (1) |
| 2007–2010 | Luzern | 88 | (17) |
| 2010 | Vancouver Whitecaps | 2 | (0) |
| 2011–2012 | Vancouver Whitecaps FC | 44 | (2) |
| 2012–2017 | Zürich | 106 | (9) |

International career^{‡}
| 2004–2005 | Italy U21 | 3 | (0) |
| 2005–2006 | Switzerland U21 | 13 | (2) |
| 2010 | Switzerland | 1 | (0) |
- * Club domestic league appearances and goals as of 12 June 2017 ‡ National team caps and goals as of 20 April 2018

Davide Chiumiento (born 22 November 1984) is a Swiss former footballer who played as a midfielder.

== Early life ==
Chiumiento was born in Switzerland but spent most of his childhood abroad. His father, Gerardo Chiumiento, was a power tool salesman and plied his trade in Canada, Saudi Arabia and Japan before returning to his home country with his son.

== Career ==
=== Juventus ===
Chiumiento began his career in 2004 at Juventus and quickly made an impressive name for himself at the club on his debut coming on as a substitute against Ancona at the age of 19. Chiumiento also played alongside his childhood hero Alessandro Del Piero, stating after the match "This was my dream".

In 2004, he was loaned out to Serie B club Siena to gain more experience. Chiumiento broke into the first-team with 14 apps and contributed to the second division side's promotion. The following year he was loaned out to French side Le Mans playing 27 Ligue 1 matches scoring one goal. In 2006, he was loaned out to Swiss club BSC Young Boys. After his performances in the Swiss Super League, FC Lucerne showed interest in the player and signed him the following year.

=== Luzern ===
Chiumiento signed a three-year contract with Luzern in the summer of 2007, for €150,000 transfer fee. Chiumiento scored his first goal for Luzern against FC Basel. Chiumiento scored his first hat-trick against FC Aarau; the match ended 6–0.

=== Vancouver Whitecaps ===
Chiumiento signed with Vancouver Whitecaps of the USSF Division 2 Professional League in 2010. He made his USSFD2 debut for Vancouver on 24 September 2010 in a 1–0 loss to Montreal Impact. He signed an MLS contract with the club on 8 March 2011. Chiumiento made his Major League Soccer debut for the Whitecaps on 19 March 2011 against Toronto FC, assisting on two goals in a 4–2 win. He scored only two goals in his time with the Whitecaps, a botched cross against the San Jose Earthquakes on 11 May. His second goal was a cutback by Camilo where he chipped the ball up, spun 360 degrees, and went bar down with his right foot. It was a candidate for MLS Goal of the Year.

=== Zürich ===
On 11 July 2012, Chiumiento was transferred to Zürich for an undisclosed fee. He scored his first goal on 19 August, putting it bottom right, making it 1–1 against Servette FC. He won the 2013–14 Swiss Cup and 2015–16 Swiss Cup with Zürich. In June 2017 his contract was not renewed.

=== International ===
Chiumiento was called up as a replacement for Johann Lonfat in Switzerland's UEFA Euro 2004 squad. However, he turned the call-up down as he still had hope of appearing for Italy.

In February 2010, Chiumiento decided to play for Switzerland and made his first appearance for the Swiss national neam in a friendly match against Uruguay after having declined many call-ups. Although his dream was to play for Italy he decided he would play for Switzerland as he has a chance to be a regular in the starting team. Chiumiento was not chosen for the Swiss 2010 FIFA World Cup squad.

== Playing style ==
Chiumiento is referred to as the Swiss Ronaldinho although he idolizes Alessandro Del Piero. He is recognized for his pace, dribbling skills, and playmaking ability. Chiumiento plays preferably as a central attacking midfielder, but can play on both wings, or as a second striker.

== Personal life ==
Davide attended Heiden Primary School in his hometown before moving to Turin, Italy, to attend Scuola Privata Athenaeum. He has a mother, Manuela Chiumiento, and an older brother, Claudio Chiumiento. Davide is fluent in four languages, English, French, Italian, and German. These have all helped him have a successful career in many countries. Davide had a great friendship with former FC Zurich striker, Eric Hassli, in his time in Vancouver, not just off the field, but on it, as many Hassli's goals were set up or created by Chiumiento. Davide was Hassli's best man at his wedding right before he transferred to FC Zurich. Some of his hobbies include spending time with his family and friends, and listening to Latin or Brazilian music, as well as surfing the internet. He is a dual citizen as his father was born in Italy.
