= Mouloud Akloul =

French footballer (born 1983)

Personal information
- Full name: Mouloud Akloul
- Date of birth: March 18, 1983 (age 43)
- Place of birth: Lorient, France
- Height: 1.87 m (6 ft 1 1/2 in)
- Position: Centre back

Youth career
- 1990–1996: Lorient-Sports
- 1996–2001: Lorient

Senior career*
| Years | Team | Apps | (Gls) |
| 2001–2004 | Lorient B | 31 | (4) |
| 2004–2006 | Vannes | 51 | (4) |
| 2007 | MO Béjaïa | 10 | (2) |
| 2007–2009 | Al-Ittihad Kalba | 31 | (0) |
| 2010 | Vancouver Whitecaps | 2 | (1) |
| 2011 | Vancouver Whitecaps FC | 8 | (0) |

International career
| 1999–2000 | France U-17 | 0 | (0) |
- * Club domestic league appearances and goals as of 00:00, January 10, 2012 (UTC)

Mouloud Akloul (born March 18, 1983, in Lorient) is a French footballer who is currently unattached.

== Career ==
=== Club ===
Akloul started his career 1990 in the youth system of his local club, Lorient-Sports. In 1996, at the age of 13, he moved across town to join city rival FC Lorient. He played with his new team until 2001, eventually graduating to the FC Lorient's reserve squad. After eight years at Lorient, he again moved to Vannes, and helped the club secure a promotion to the Championnat de France amateur for the 2004–05 season.

In January 2007, Akloul left France and signed with MO Béjaïa in the Algerian Championnat National 2, where he spent 6 months. In 2007 Akloul left Algeria to play in the United Arab Emirates for Al-Ittihad Kalba of the UAE Football League.

On April 8, 2010, Akloul signed for the Vancouver Whitecaps of the USSF Division 2 Professional League. He made his debut for the team on April 24, 2010, against AC St. Louis, but during the game he broke his ankle while scoring his team's winning goal. He did not return to action until October 2, in the Whitecaps' final regular season game of the year.

The expansion Vancouver Whitecaps FC signed Akloul to a Major League Soccer contract on March 31, 2011. The Whitecaps released Akloul on July 28, 2011.

=== International ===
Akloul played for the France national under-17 football team in 1999 and 2000. He is also eligible to play for Algeria.

== Personal life ==
He holds the dual nationality, being both a citizen of France and Algeria.
