= Alexandre Morfaw =

Cameroonian footballer

Personal information
- Full name: Alexandre Morfaw
- Date of birth: 31 August 1987 (age 39)
- Place of birth: Douala, Cameroon
- Height: 5 ft 11 in (1.80 m)
- Position: Midfielder

Youth career
- 1999: Bordeaux
- 2000–2005: Nantes

Senior career*
Years	Team	Apps	(Gls)
2005–2007	Nantes	0	(0)
2005–2007	→ Nantes II (loan)	40	(5)
2007	Leicester City	0	(0)
2007–2008	Scunthorpe United	0	(0)
2008	→ Lincoln City (loan)	0	(0)
2009–2010	Boden	30	(8)
2010	Vancouver Whitecaps	8	(0)
2011	Vancouver Whitecaps FC	2	(0)
2011	→ Vancouver Whitecaps FC U-23 (loan)	12	(3)

International career
2007	Cameroon U-20		
- * Club domestic league appearances and goals as of 3 October 2011

Alexandre Morfaw (born 31 August 1987) is a Cameroonian footballer who last played for Vancouver Whitecaps FC in Major League Soccer.

== Career ==
=== Youth and amateur ===
Morfaw was born in Douala, Cameroon, and grew up in Paris, France. He attended College Paul Bert, before moving with his family to Nantes in Brittany. He attended the Centre Educatif Nantais pour Sportifs, and spent a brief time with the academy at Bordeaux, before entering the youth system of Nantes in 2000.

=== Professional ===
Morfaw was called up to Nantes' senior squad in 2005. He scored four goals in 17 appearances for Nantes' reserves in the Championnat de France amateur (CFA) in 2005–2006, and scored one more goal in 23 appearances in 2006–2007, but never made a first team appearance for the club and was released prior to the beginning of the 2007–2008 season.

Morfaw signed a multi-year contract with English Football League Championship side Leicester City in the summer of 2007, but a change in manager resulted in Morfaw being released by the club before he played a game. Following a successful trial, he signed with Scunthorpe United in August 2007, but a preseason ankle injury restricted him to just six appearances with Scunthorpe's reserve side. He had a brief spell with Lincoln City in Football League Two in February 2008, and was released by Scunthorpe on 9 May 2008, again without having played a senior game for his parent club.

Morfaw moved north to Sweden and joined Bodens BK in February 2009. He scored eight goals in 22 appearances during his first season with the club, helping them achieve promotion from the fourth to the third tier of Swedish soccer. In 2010, playing in the Division 1 Norra, Morfaw started all but one of his eight appearances during his second season with Boden.

Morfaw left Boden in the summer of 2010 and relocated to Canada, signing with the Vancouver Whitecaps of the USSF Division 2 Professional League. He made his Whitecaps debut on 5 September 2010 in a 0–0 tie with the Puerto Rico Islanders, and made three regular season and three playoff appearances for the team before their semi-final loss to the Puerto Rico Islanders.

He continued with Vancouver Whitecaps FC when the club moved to Major League Soccer in 2011. Morfaw signed with the now-MLS side on 17 March 2011. Morfaw was waived by Vancouver on 23 November 2011.

=== International ===
Morfaw has represented Cameroon at the U-20 level. He was part of the Cameroon squad which took part in the 2007 African Youth Championship, and helped the U-23 squad qualify for the 2008 Men's Olympic Football Tournament, but was unable to travel to compete in the Olympic Games due to injury.
