= RedNation Online =

Canadian soccer online news magazine

- Website type: Soccer news magazine
- Available in: English
- Owner: RedNation
- Key people: Steve Bottjer; Ian Clarke; Rick Evangelista
- Website: rednationonline.ca
- Commercial: Yes
- Launched: May 2009; 17 years ago
- Current status: Inactive since August 2018; 8 years ago

RedNation Online is a Canadian online magazine for Canadian soccer news.

The site covers Toronto FC, Vancouver Whitecaps FC, CF Montreal and the men's and women's program. In 2012, the site was awarded the Canadian Online Publishing Awards' Gold Award for Best Online-Only Publication Website.
