= Nizar Khalfan =

Tanzanian footballer (born 1988)

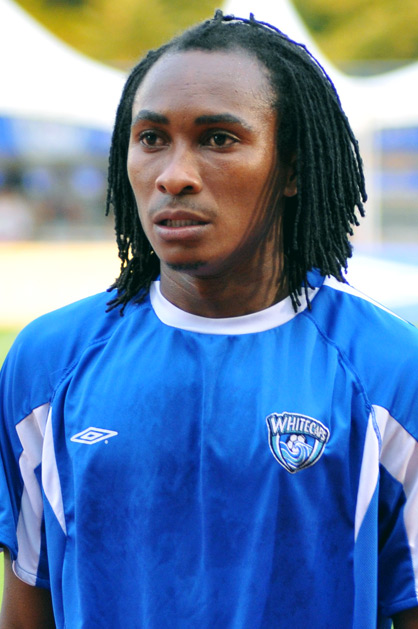
- Khalfan with Vancouver Whitecaps in 2009

Personal information
- Full name: Nizar Hassan Khalfan Khalfani
- Date of birth: 21 June 1988 (age 38)
- Place of birth: Mtwara, Tanzania
- Height: 5 ft 8 in (1.73 m)
- Position: Midfielder

Team information
- Current team: Pamba S.C.

Senior career*
Years	Team	Apps	(Gls)
2005–2007	Mtibwa Sugar	57	(16)
2007	Al Tadamon	18	(1)
2008	Tadamon Sour	25	(2)
2008–2009	Moro United	21	(7)
2009–2010	Vancouver Whitecaps	26	(2)
2011	Vancouver Whitecaps FC	22	(1)
2012–2015	Young Africans SC		
2015–2016	Mwadui United		
2016–2019	Singida United		
2019–	Pamba		

International career^{‡}
2004–2012	Tanzania	45	(5)
- * Club domestic league appearances and goals as of 14 April 2021 ‡ National team caps and goals as of 14 April 2021

Nizar Khalfan (born 21 June 1988) is a Tanzanian professional footballer who plays as a midfielder for Pamba.

== Career ==
=== Early career ===
Khalfan started playing football in his hometown of Mtwara with a youth team called Score FC. As a student Khalfan attended Ligula Primary School and Ocean Secondary School in Mtwara.

=== Club ===
Khalfan began his career with Mtibwa Sugar FC. He then joined the Kuwaiti Premier League club Al Tadamon for the 2007–08 season. In January 2008 he left Al Tadamon for Lebanese club Tadamon Sour, but soon returned to the Tanzanian Premier League with Moro United. He joined Canadian side Vancouver Whitecaps FC on 22 August 2009. He played nine games for the Caps in their successful 2009 season and signed a contract extension to play with the team in 2010. He scored his first goal for the Whitecaps on 12 June 2010 in a game against the Austin Aztex. On 9 February 2011 signed a new one-year contract for the 2011 Major League Soccer season. Khalfan was waived by Vancouver on 23 November 2011, and was selected in the MLS Waiver Draft by Philadelphia Union. The Union released him three months later prior to the 2012 season.

=== International ===
Khalfan was formerly a member of the Tanzania national football team. He played in five of Tanzania's qualifying matches for the 2010 FIFA World Cup, scoring in the 4–1 victory over Mauritius on 6 September 2008. He also scored the game-winning goal in a 2–1 victory over Burkina Faso at the Benjamin Mkapa National Stadium in Dar-es-Salaam on 14 June 2007.

=== International goals ===
The following information is valid up to 11 November 2011.

#	Date	Venue	Opponent	Score	Result	Competition
1	2 September 2006	Benjamin Mkapa National Stadium, Dar es Salaam, Tanzania	Burkina Faso	2–1	2–1	2008 African Cup of Nations Qualifiers
2	9 December 2006	Benjamin Mkapa National Stadium, Dar es Salaam, Tanzania	DR Congo	1–0	2–0	Friendly
3	2 June 2007	CCM Kirumba Stadium, Mwanza, Tanzania	Senegal	1–0	1–1	2008 African Cup of Nations Qualifiers
4	9 June 2008	Stade George V, Curepipe, Mauritius	Mauritius	1–2	1–4	2010 FIFA World Cup qualification
5	13 January 2009	Mandela National Stadium, Kampala, Uganda	Burundi	2–2	3–2	2009 CECAFA Cup
