= Alain Rochat =

Canadian-Swiss footballer (born 1983)

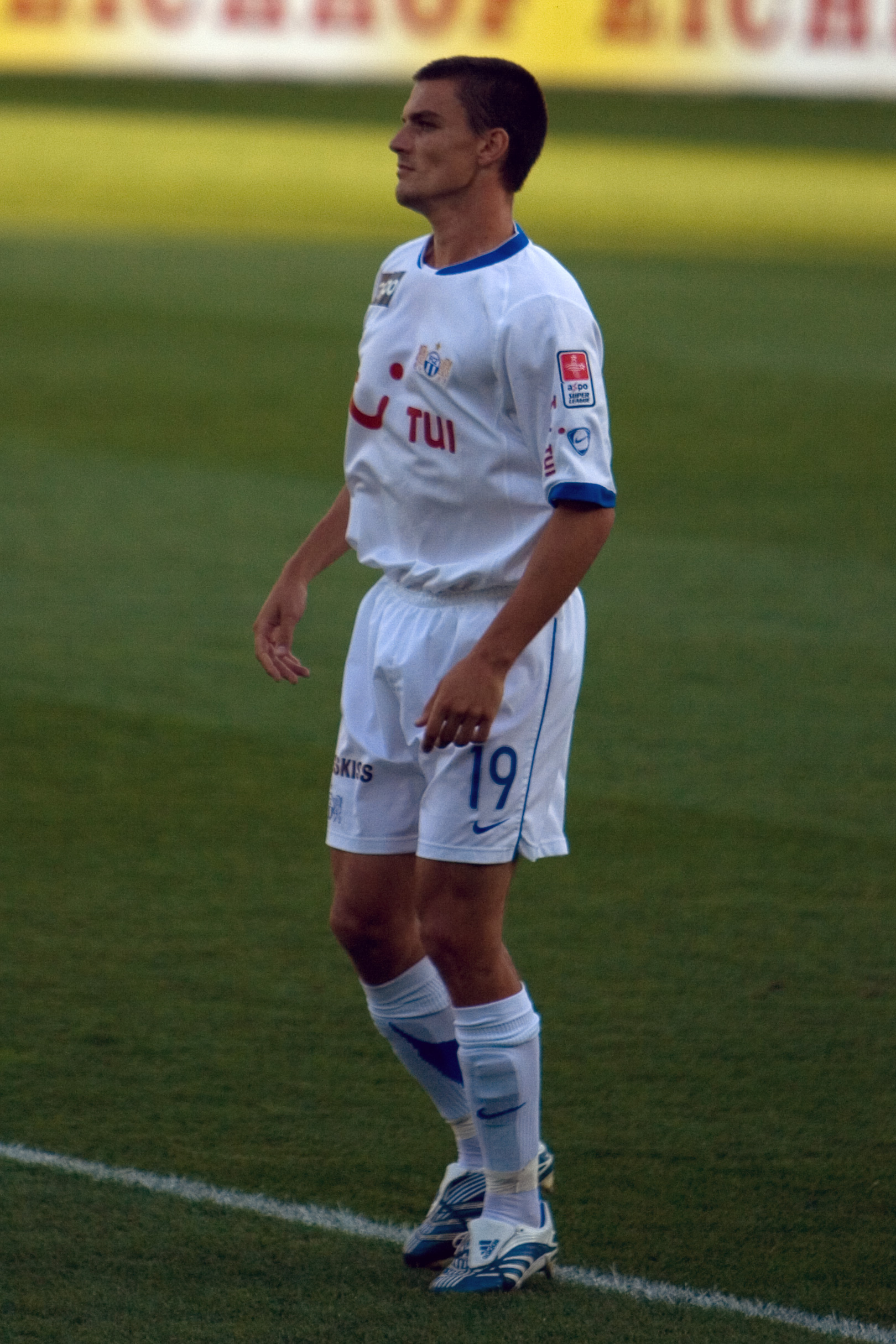

Personal information
- Date of birth: 1 February 1983 (age 43)
- Place of birth: Saint-Jean-sur-Richelieu, Quebec, Canada
- Height: 5 ft 11 in (1.80 m)
- Positions: Full-back; defensive midfielder

Senior career*
Years	Team	Apps	(Gls)
1999–2002	Yverdon Sport	52	(7)
2002–2005	Young Boys	115	(5)
2005–2006	Rennes	9	(0)
2006–2011	FC Zürich^{[A]}	117	(7)
2011–2013	Vancouver Whitecaps	67	(5)
2013	D.C. United	5	(0)
2013–2017	Young Boys	83	(4)
2017–2018	Lausanne-Sport	30	(1)

International career
2001–2006	Switzerland U21	42	(2)
2005	Switzerland	1	(0)
- * Club domestic league appearances and goals

Alain Rochat (born 1 February 1983) is a former professional footballer who played as a full-back. Born in Canada, he represented Switzerland internationally.

== Club career ==
=== Switzerland ===
Rochat was born in Canada but his family moved to Switzerland when he was two years old. He began his career at Yverdon-Sport in 1999 before moving to Young Boys in 2002. His play with Young Boys led to a move to French side Rennes in 2005.

Seeing limited action with the French side, Rochat returned to Switzerland joining top side FC Zürich in time for the 2006 campaign. Rochat was part of the FC Zürich side that won Swiss Super League championship titles during the 2006–07 and 2008–09 campaigns. Having become a prominent member of FC Zurich, he signed a new four-year contract with the club. In 2010, Rochat and FC Zürich reached the group stage of the UEFA Champions League, where they faced Spanish giants Real Madrid, Italian powerhouse AC Milan, and France's Olympique de Marseille in Group C.

=== Vancouver Whitecaps ===
He signed with USSF-D2 Vancouver Whitecaps FC during the 2010 season but was immediately loaned back to FC Zürich until 21 January 2011. He joined the Vancouver Whitecaps FC of Major League Soccer upon his return. During the 2011 Major League Soccer season, the Whitecaps finished last MLS, but during the 2012 season, Rochat switched from his usual left back position to a defensive midfield position and helped lead the team to more than 10 clean sheets.

=== D.C. United ===
Rochat was traded to D.C. United on 7 June 2013 in exchange for a second-round pick in the 2015 MLS SuperDraft and a conditional pick in the 2016 MLS SuperDraft. Rochat was reportedly unhappy with the trade since it disrupted his family life.

=== Return to Switzerland ===
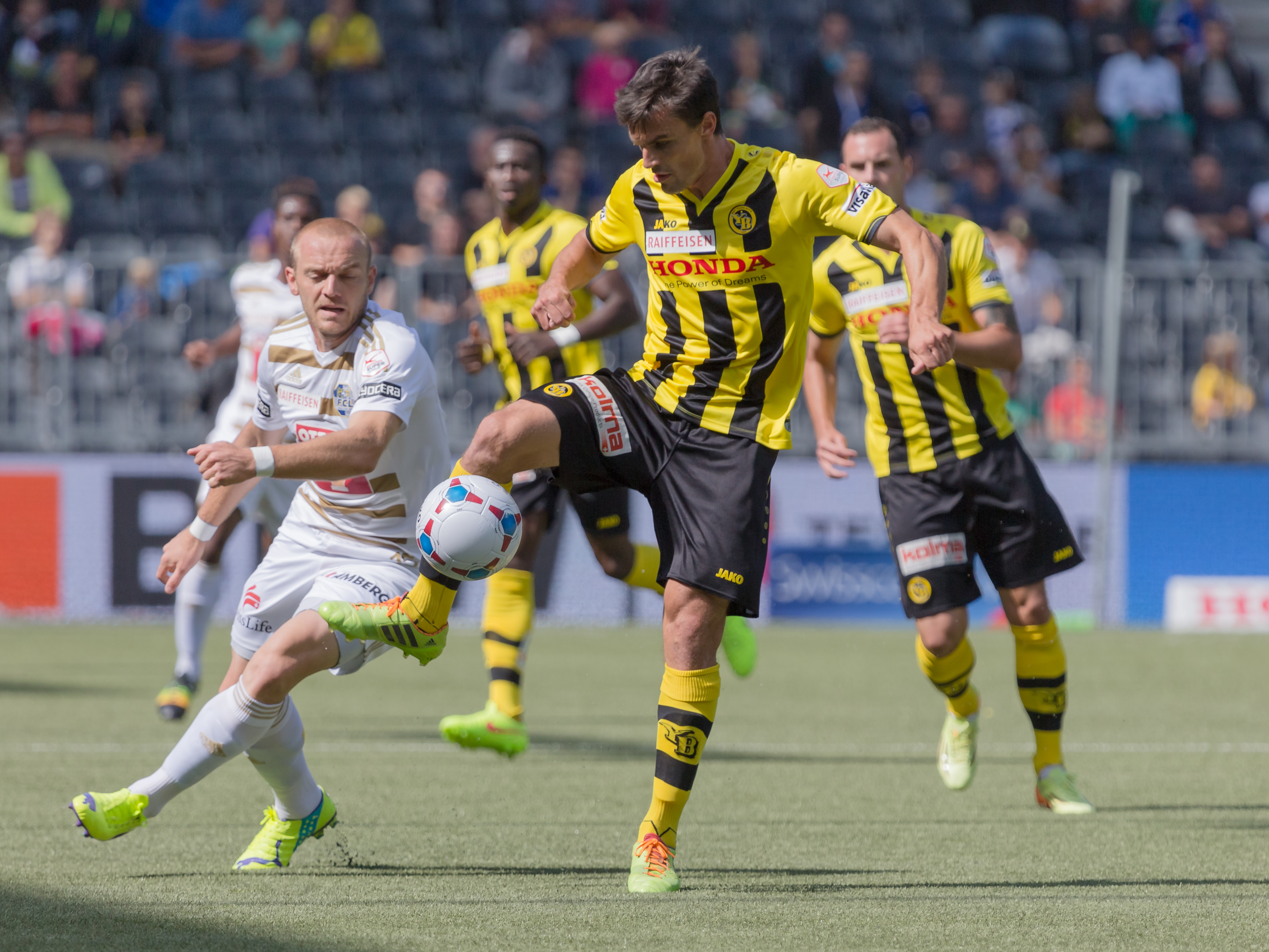
Rochat with BSC Young Boys

After a month with D.C. United, Rochat was sold to one of his former clubs, Young Boys, for a fee of $500,000.

== International career ==
Rochat appeared for Switzerland at the youth international level before making his senior international debut on 4 June 2005, as Switzerland claimed a 3–1 away victory over the Faroe Islands in Group Four of European qualifying for the 2006 FIFA World Cup in Germany.

== Honours ==
FC Zürich

- Swiss Super League: 2006–07, 2008–09

== Notes ==
A. Signed with Vancouver Whitecaps FC of Major League Soccer and then loaned-back to Zürich until January 2011.
