= 2017 Vancouver Whitecaps FC season =

Vancouver Whitecaps FC 2017 soccer season

Vancouver Whitecaps FC
2017 season
- Chairman: John Furlong
- Head coach: Carl Robinson
- Stadium: BC Place (Capacity: 22,120)
- Major League Soccer: Conference: 3rd Overall: 8th
- MLS Cup Playoffs: Conference Semifinals
- Canadian Championship: Semifinals
- CONCACAF Champions League: Semifinals
- Cascadia Cup: 3rd
- Top goalscorer: League: Fredy Montero (14); All: Fredy Montero (15)
- Highest home attendance: 27,837 (October 29 vs. Seattle Sounders FC)
- Lowest home attendance: 14,183 (March 2 vs. New York Red Bulls)
Home colours	Away colours

The 2017 Vancouver Whitecaps FC season was the club's seventh season in Major League Soccer, the top division of soccer in the United States and Canada. Including previous iterations of the franchise, it was the 40th season of professional soccer being played in Vancouver under a variation of the "Whitecaps" name.

Outside of MLS, the Whitecaps played in the knockout rounds of the 2016–17 CONCACAF Champions League, where they faced fellow MLS team the New York Red Bulls in the quarterfinals. Additionally, the team played in the 2017 Canadian Championship.

== Roster ==
As of September 8, 2017

No.	Player	Nationality	Position	Date of birth (age)	Previous club
Goalkeepers
1	David Ousted	(Denmark)	GK	February 1, 1985 (age 41)	Randers FC
18	Spencer Richey	(United States)	GK	May 30, 1992 (age 34)	Whitecaps FC 2
24	Stefan Marinovic	(New Zealand)	GK	October 7, 1991 (age 35)	SpVgg Unterhaching
Defenders
2	Jordan Harvey	(United States)	DF	January 28, 1984 (age 42)	Philadelphia Union
3	Sam Adekugbe (on loan at IFK Göteborg)	(Canada)	DF	January 16, 1995 (age 31)	Vancouver Whitecaps FC U-23
4	Kendall Waston	(Costa Rica)	DF	January 1, 1988 (age 38)	Deportivo Saprissa
6	David Edgar	(Canada)	DF	May 19, 1987 (age 39)	Birmingham City
14	Cole Seiler	(United States)	DF	February 5, 1994 (age 32)	Georgetown Hoyas
22	Aaron Maund	(United States)	DF	September 19, 1990 (age 36)	Real Salt Lake
25	Sheanon Williams	(United States)	DF	March 17, 1990 (age 36)	Houston Dynamo
26	Tim Parker	(United States)	DF	February 23, 1993 (age 33)	St. John's Red Storm
28	Jake Nerwinski	(United States)	DF	October 17, 1994 (age 32)	Connecticut Huskies
46	Brett Levis	(Canada)	DF	May 29, 1993 (age 33)	Whitecaps FC 2
Midfielders
7	Christian Bolaños	(Costa Rica)	MF	May 17, 1984 (age 42)	Deportivo Saprissa
8	Andrew Jacobson	(United States)	MF	September 25, 1985 (age 41)	New York City FC
11	Nicolás Mezquida	(Uruguay)	MF	January 21, 1992 (age 34)	Fénix
13	Cristian Techera	(Uruguay)	MF	May 31, 1992 (age 34)	River Plate Montevideo
15	Matías Laba	(Argentina)	MF	December 11, 1991 (age 34)	Toronto FC
16	Tony Tchani	(Cameroon)	MF	April 13, 1989 (age 37)	Columbus Crew SC
17	Marcel de Jong	(Canada)	DF	October 15, 1986 (age 40)	Ottawa Fury
20	Brek Shea	(United States)	MF	February 28, 1990 (age 36)	Orlando City SC
27	Deybi Flores (on loan at C.D. Motagua)	(Honduras)	MF	June 16, 1996 (age 30)	C.D. Motagua
29	Yordy Reyna	(Peru)	MF	September 16, 1993 (age 33)	Red Bull Salzburg
30	Ben McKendry (on loan at FC Edmonton)	(Canada)	MF	March 25, 1993 (age 33)	Vancouver Whitecaps FC Residency
31	Russell Teibert	(Canada)	MF	December 22, 1992 (age 33)	Vancouver Whitecaps (USSF-D2)
32	Marco Bustos	(Canada)	MF	April 22, 1996 (age 30)	Vancouver Whitecaps FC Residency
50	Nosa Igiebor	(Nigeria)	MF	November 9, 1990 (age 36)	Çaykur Rizespor
66	Ali Ghazal	(Egypt)	MF	February 1, 1992 (age 34)	Guizhou Zhicheng
67	Alphonso Davies	(Canada)	MF	November 2, 2000 (age 26)	Whitecaps FC 2
77	Mauro Rosales	(Argentina)	MF	February 24, 1981 (age 45)	FC Dallas
Forwards
12	Fredy Montero	(Colombia)	FW	July 26, 1987 (age 39)	Tianjin TEDA
19	Erik Hurtado	(United States)	FW	May 11, 1990 (age 36)	Santa Clara
23	Bernie Ibini-Isei	(Australia)	FW	September 12, 1992 (age 34)	Club Brugge
47	Kyle Greig (on loan at FC Cincinnati)	(United States)	FW	February 22, 1990 (age 36)	Whitecaps FC 2

=== Transfers ===
==== In ====
No.	Pos.	Player	Transferred from	Fee/notes	Date	Ref.
27	MF	(Honduras) Deybi Flores	(Honduras) C.D. Motagua	Loan Return	December 8, 2017	
25	DF	(United States) Sheanon Williams	(United States) Houston Dynamo	Traded in exchange for general allocation money	December 13, 2016	
39	GK	(United States) Spencer Richey	(Canada) Whitecaps FC 2	Free	December 19, 2016	
47	FW	(United States) Kyle Greig	(Canada) Whitecaps FC 2	Free	December 19, 2016	
29	MF	(Peru) Yordy Reyna	(Austria) Red Bull Salzburg	Undisclosed	January 23, 2017	
28	DF	(United States) Jake Nerwinski	(United States) Connecticut Huskies	2017 MLS SuperDraft	February 9, 2017	
12	FW	(Colombia) Fredy Montero	(China) Tianjin TEDA	One Year Loan/Designated Player	February 15, 2017	
20	MF	(United States) Brek Shea	(United States) Orlando City SC	Trade in exchange for Giles Barnes	February 25, 2017	
77	MF	(Argentina) Mauro Rosales	(United States) FC Dallas	Free	February 27, 2017	
16	MF	(Cameroon) Tony Tchani	(United States) Columbus Crew SC	Traded with allocation money in exchange for Kekuta Manneh	March 30, 2017	
23	FW	(Australia) Bernie Ibini-Isei	(Belgium) Club Brugge	Undisclosed	May 9, 2017	
3	DF	(Canada) Sam Adekugbe	(England) Brighton and Hove Albion	Loan Return	July 10, 2017	
24	GK	(New Zealand) Stefan Marinovic	(Germany) SpVgg Unterhaching	Free	July 21, 2017	
22	DF	(United States) Aaron Maund	(United States) Real Salt Lake	Traded in exchange for a 2018 third round pick	August 9, 2017	
66	MF	(Egypt) Ali Ghazal	(China) Guizhou Zhicheng	Free	August 10, 2017	
50	MF	(Nigeria) Nosa Igiebor	(Turkey) Çaykur Rizespor	Free	September 8, 2017	

==== Out ====
Pos.	Player	Transferred to	Fee/notes	Date	Ref.
MF	(Chile) Pedro Morales		Option Declined (Note: Following his release, Morales signed for Colo-Colo.)	December 7, 2016	
DF	(Canada) Fraser Aird	(Scotland) Rangers	Option Declined/Loan Return	December 8, 2016	
GK	(Canada) Marco Carducci		Option Declined (Note: Following his release, Carducci signed for Rio Grande Valley FC Toros.)	December 8, 2016	
DF	(Costa Rica) Jordan Smith	(Costa Rica) Deportivo Saprissa	Option Declined/Loan Return	December 8, 2016	
FW	(Panama) Blas Pérez		Out of Contract (Note: As a free agent, Pérez signed with Árabe Unido.)	December 8, 2016	
FW	(Japan) Masato Kudo	(Japan) Sanfrecce Hiroshima	Mutual Contract Termination	December 30, 2016	
MF	(Canada) Kianz Froese	(Germany) Fortuna Düsseldorf	Undisclosed	February 1, 2017	
FW	(Jamaica) Giles Barnes	(United States) Orlando City SC	Traded in exchange for Brek Shea	February 25, 2017	
FW	(The Gambia) Kekuta Manneh	(United States) Columbus Crew SC	Traded in exchange for Tony Tchani and allocation money	March 30, 2017	
MF	(Honduras) Deybi Flores	(Honduras) C.D. Motagua	Loan	June 26, 2017	
FW	(United States) Kyle Greig	(United States) FC Cincinnati	Loan	July 11, 2017	
GK	(Italy) Paolo Tornaghi		Mutual Contract Termination	July 18, 2017	
DF	(Canada) Sam Adekugbe	(Sweden) IFK Göteborg	Loan	July 25, 2017	
MF	(Canada) Ben McKendry	(Canada) FC Edmonton	Loan	July 26, 2017	
DF	(United States) Christian Dean	(United States) Chicago Fire	Traded in exchange for allocation money	August 9, 2017	

== Major League Soccer ==
=== Preseason ===
January 27, 2017	Whitecaps FC	0–1	Cardiff City	Vale of Glamorgan, Wales
3:30 (PST)		Report	Sobowale 48'	Stadium: Cardiff City Training Complex

January 30, 2017	Whitecaps FC	4–0	Oxford United	Newport, Wales
5:00 (PST)	Hurtado 13'; de Jong 56'; Greig 80'; Techera 87'	Report		Stadium: Wales National Football Development Centre

February 2, 2017	Whitecaps FC	4–0	Bristol City	Vale of Glamorgan, Wales
4:00 (PST)	Harvey 9'; Davies 12', 39'; Mezquida 63'	Report		Stadium: Hensol Park

Simple Invitational

February 9, 2017	Whitecaps FC	1–1	Minnesota United FC	Portland, Oregon, U.S.
17:00 (PST)	Jacobson (yellow card) 24'; Teibert 82', (yellow card) 86'	Report	Hurtado 49' (o.g.); Venegas (yellow card) 86'; Jones (yellow card) 88'	Stadium: Providence Park

February 12, 2017	Whitecaps FC	1–1	Real Salt Lake	Portland, Oregon, U.S.
14:30 (PST)	Techera (yellow card) 58'; Williams (yellow card) 59'; Reyna 70'	Report	Sunday (yellow card) 77'; Allen 83'	Stadium: Providence Park

February 15, 2017	Whitecaps FC	1–2	Portland Timbers	Portland, Oregon, U.S.
19:30 (PST)	Laba (yellow card) 64'; Techera 80'; Williams (yellow card) 84'	Report	Valeri 26'; Adi 28'; Ridgewell (yellow card) 48'	Stadium: Providence Park

Pos	Team	GP	W	L	D	GF	GA	GD	Pts
1	Portland Timbers	3	1	0	2	7	6	+1	5
2	Real Salt Lake	3	0	0	3	7	7	0	3
3	Minnesota United FC	3	0	0	3	6	6	0	3
4	Vancouver Whitecaps FC	3	0	1	2	3	4	-1	2

=== Regular season ===
==== League tables ====
===== Western Conference =====
Pos	Team	Pld	W	L	T	GF	GA	GD	Pts	Qualification
1	Portland Timbers	34	15	11	8	60	50	+10	53	Qualification for the conference semifinals
2	Seattle Sounders FC	34	14	9	11	52	39	+13	53	Qualification for the conference semifinals
3	Vancouver Whitecaps FC	34	15	12	7	50	49	+1	52	Qualification for the knockout round
4	Houston Dynamo	34	13	10	11	57	45	+12	50	Qualification for the knockout round
5	Sporting Kansas City	34	12	9	13	40	29	+11	49	Qualification for the knockout round

Source: MLS

===== Overall =====
Pos	Team	Pld	W	L	T	GF	GA	GD	Pts
6	Portland Timbers	34	15	11	8	60	50	+10	53
7	Seattle Sounders FC	34	14	9	11	52	39	+13	53
8	Vancouver Whitecaps FC	34	15	12	7	50	49	+1	52
9	New York Red Bulls	34	14	12	8	53	47	+6	50
10	Houston Dynamo	34	13	10	11	57	45	+12	50

Source: MLS
Rules for classification: 1) points; 2) total wins; 3) total goal differential; 4) total goals scored; 5) disciplinary points; 6) away goals scored; 7) away goal differential; 8) coin toss or drawing of lots

==== Results ====
Overall								Home						Away					
Pld	Pts	W	L	D	GF	GA	GD	W	L	D	GF	GA	GD	W	L	D	GF	GA	GD
34	52	15	12	7	50	49	+1	9	3	5	30	20	+10	6	9	2	20	29	−9

Last updated: October 22, 2017
Pld = Matches played; Pts = Points; W = Matches won; T = Matches tied; L = Matches lost; GF = Goals for; GA = Goals against; GD = Goal difference

Round	1	2	3	4	5	6	7	8	9	10	11	12	13	14	15	16	17	18	19	20	21	22	23	24	25	26	27	28	29	30	31	32	33	34
Ground	H	A	H	H	A	H	A	A	A	A	H	H	H	H	A	A	H	A	H	A	A	A	H	H	A	H	H	H	H	A	A	A	H	A
Result	D	L	L	W	L	W	L	W	W	L	W	L	W	D	D	L	W	W	L	W	D	L	W	D	W	W	W	D	W	L	W	L	D	L

A = Away; H = Home; W = Win; D = Draw; L = Loss

March 5, 2017 1	Whitecaps FC	0–0	Philadelphia Union	Vancouver, British Columbia
18:30 (PST)	Laba (yellow card) 55'	Report	Herbers (yellow card) 80'	Stadium: BC Place; Attendance: 19,083; Referee: Sorin Stoica

March 11, 2017 2	San Jose Earthquakes	3–2	Whitecaps FC	San Jose, California
19:00 (PST)	Alashe (yellow card) 7'; Wondolowski 32'; Lima 54'; Godoy 79'	Report	Hurtado 2'; Teibert (yellow card) 15'; Mezquida 17'; Ousted (red card) 23'; Dean (yellow card) 89'	Stadium: Avaya Stadium; Attendance: 18,000; Referee: Drew Fischer

March 18, 2017 3	Whitecaps FC	0–2	Toronto FC	Vancouver, British Columbia
13:00 PDT	Shea (yellow card) 70' (red card) 70'	Report	Vázquez 76'; Altidore 80'; Bradley (yellow card) 87'	Stadium: BC Place; Attendance: 20,438; Referee: Ismail Elfath

April 1, 2017 4	Whitecaps FC	4–2	LA Galaxy	Vancouver, British Columbia
19:00 PDT	Techera 19'; Montero 66' (yellow card) 80'; Laba 67', 87'	Report	Alessandrini 26', 30'; McBean (yellow card) 60'; Jones (yellow card) 77'	Stadium: BC Place; Attendance: 25,083; Referee: Allen Chapman

April 8, 2017 5	Real Salt Lake	3–0	Whitecaps FC	Sandy, Utah
18:30 PDT	Schuler (yellow card) 40'; Beckerman (yellow card) 42'; Rusnak 54'; Movsisyan 74'; Mulholland 78'	Report	Laba (yellow card) 29'	Stadium: Rio Tinto Stadium; Attendance: 17,069; Referee: Baldomero Toledo

April 14, 2017 6	Whitecaps FC	2–1	Seattle Sounders FC	Vancouver, British Columbia
19:00 PDT	Williams (yellow card) 27'; Montero (yellow card) 53' (goal) 65', 80'; Parker (yellow card) 90+3'	Report	Lodeiro (yellow card) 37'; Shipp (yellow card) 44'; Bruin 89'	Stadium: BC Place; Attendance: 22,120; Referee: Kevin Stott

April 22, 2017 7	Portland Timbers	2–1	Whitecaps FC	Portland, Oregon
13:00 PDT	Nagbe 18'; Mattocks 40'; Ridgewell (yellow card) 68'; Barmby (yellow card) 90+4'	Report	Jacobson (yellow card) 42'; Montero 59'; Harvey (yellow card) 64'; Williams (yellow card) 85'	Stadium: Providence Park; Attendance: 21,144; Referee: Chris Penso

April 29, 2017 8	Montreal Impact	1–2	Whitecaps FC	Montreal, Quebec
12:00 PDT	Donadel 9' (yellow card) 59'; Fisher (yellow card) 28'; Bernardello (yellow card) 41'; Oduro (yellow card) 90+4'	Report	Jacobson 29'; Laba (yellow card) 65'; Techera 79'	Stadium: Stade Saputo; Attendance: 19,597; Referee: Drew Fischer

May 5, 2017 9	Colorado Rapids	0–1	Whitecaps FC	Commerce City, Colorado
19:00 PDT	Williams (yellow card) 40' (red card) 88'; Gashi (yellow card) 80'	Report	Montero (yellow card) 48'; Shea 84'	Stadium: Dick's Sporting Goods Park; Attendance: 13,745; Referee: Jorge González

May 12, 2017 10	Houston Dynamo	2–1	Whitecaps FC	Houston, Texas
18:00 PDT	Elis 16'; Machado (yellow card) 21'; Manotas (yellow card) 61'; Torres 68' (pen.); DeLaGarza (yellow card) 90+2'	Report	Laba (yellow card) 39'; Waston (yellow card) 67'; Shea 85'	Stadium: BBVA Compass Stadium; Attendance: 16,075; Referee: Fotos Bazakos

May 20, 2017 11	Whitecaps FC	2–0	Sporting Kansas City	Vancouver, British Columbia
16:00 PDT	Techera 40'; Parker 67'; Laba (yellow card) 89'	Report	Espinoza (yellow card) 66'; Sinovic (yellow card) 77'	Stadium: BC Place; Attendance: 21,020; Referee: Baldomero Toledo

May 27, 2017 12	Whitecaps FC	0–1	D.C. United	Vancouver, British Columbia
16:00 PDT	Tchani (yellow card) 53'; Parker (yellow card) 90+7'	Report	Neagle 61' (pen.); Opare (yellow card) 76'	Stadium: BC Place; Attendance: 20,905; Referee: Sorin Stoica

June 3, 2017 13	Whitecaps FC	3–1	Atlanta United FC	Vancouver, British Columbia
14:30 PDT	Waston 31', 44' (yellow card) 87'; Montero 68'	Report	Garza 7'; Almiron (yellow card) 62'; Pírez (yellow card) 70'	Stadium: BC Place; Attendance: 19,816; Referee: Robert Sibiga

June 17, 2017 14	Whitecaps FC	1–1	FC Dallas	Vancouver, British Columbia
19:00 PDT	Laba (yellow card) 49'; Techera 74'	Report	Urruti 52'; Harris (yellow card) 90+1'	Stadium: BC Place; Attendance: 22,120; Referee: Alan Kelly

June 24, 2017 15	Minnesota United FC	2–2	Whitecaps FC	Minneapolis, Minnesota
17:00 PDT	Shuttleworth (yellow card) 16'; Kallman (yellow card) 45+1'; Calvo 50'; Thiesson (yellow card) 54' (goal) 63'; Ibson (yellow card) 59'	Report	Techera 17' (pen.) (yellow card) 65'; Tchani (yellow card) 26' (goal) 45+2'	Stadium: TCF Bank Stadium; Attendance: 19,016; Referee: Jose Carlos Rivero

July 1, 2017 16	Chicago Fire	4–0	Whitecaps FC	Bridgeview, Illinois
16:00 PDT	Nikolic 14', 18'; Alvarez 25'; de Leeuw 84'	Report	Laba (red card) 78'	Stadium: Toyota Park; Attendance: 20,187; Referee: Ismail Elfath

July 5, 2017 17	Whitecaps FC	3–2	New York City FC	Vancouver, British Columbia
19:00 PDT	Montero 3' (yellow card) 43'; Shea (yellow card) 23'; Waston (yellow card) 39'; Harvey 54'; Tchani (yellow card) 75'; Reyna 88' (yellow card) 88'	Report	Herrera (yellow card) 17'; Chanot 34'; Villa 40' (pen.); Harrison (yellow card) 56'; Ring (yellow card) 68'	Stadium: BC Place; Attendance: 22,120; Referee: Baldomero Toledo

July 19, 2017 18	LA Galaxy	0–1	Whitecaps FC	Carson, California
19:30 PDT	Pedro (yellow card) 90+2'	Report	Tchani (yellow card) 23' (goal) 64'	Stadium: StubHub Center; Attendance: 17,404; Referee: Ricardo Salazar

July 23, 2017 19	Whitecaps FC	1–2	Portland Timbers	Vancouver, British Columbia
15:30 PDT	Jacobson 45'; Mezquida (yellow card) 45+1'; Ousted (yellow card) 77'	Report	Ebobisse 14'; Blanco 49'; Miller (yellow card) 79'; Barmby (yellow card) 84'; Zemanski (yellow card) 90'	Stadium: BC Place; Attendance: 25,083; Referee: Chris Penso

July 29, 2017 20	FC Dallas	0–4	Whitecaps FC	Frisco, Texas
17:00 PDT	Gruezo (red card) 59'; Harris (yellow card) 89'	Report	Ibini-Isei 18'; Montero 49' (pen.), 67'; Reyna (yellow card) 79'; Mezquida 83'	Stadium: Toyota Stadium; Attendance: 15,274; Referee: Baldomero Toledo

August 5, 2017 21	Colorado Rapids	2–2	Whitecaps FC	Commerce City, Colorado
19:00 PDT	Sjoberg 15'; Azira (yellow card) 45+1'; Doyle 54'; Miller (yellow card) 68'; Hairston (yellow card) 75'	Report	Tchani 5'; Montero 76'	Stadium: Dick's Sporting Goods Park; Attendance: 15,625; Referee: Nima Saghafi

August 12, 2017 22	New England Revolution	1–0	Whitecaps FC	Foxborough, Massachusetts
17:00 PDT	Nguyen (yellow card) 45+3'; Bunbury 53'; Kamara (yellow card) 63'; Watson (yellow card) 69'	Report	Jacobson (yellow card) 41'	Stadium: Gillette Stadium; Attendance: 19,911; Referee: Ismail Elfath

August 19, 2017 23	Whitecaps FC	2–1	Houston Dynamo	Vancouver, British Columbia
19:00 PDT	Montero 17' (pen.) (yellow card) 71'; Harvey (yellow card) 31'; Reyna 32'; Nerwinski (yellow card) 41'; Ousted (yellow card) 79'	Report	Machado (yellow card) 46'; Quioto 51'; García (yellow card) 73'; Cabezas (yellow card) 83'; DeLaGarza (yellow card) 90+3'	Stadium: BC Place; Attendance: 21,183; Referee: Drew Fischer

August 23, 2017 24	Whitecaps FC	1–1	Seattle Sounders FC	Vancouver, British Columbia
19:00 PDT	Montero (yellow card) 31' (goal) 64'; Waston (yellow card) 32'; Tchani (yellow card) 52' (yellow-red card) 60'		Lodeiro 19' (pen.); Nouhou (yellow card) 31'; Alfaro (yellow card) 45'	Stadium: BC Place; Attendance: 22,120; Referee: Ricardo Salazar

August 26, 2017 25	Orlando City SC	1–2	Whitecaps FC	Orlando, Florida
16:30 PDT	Toia (yellow card) 27'; Larin 62'; Redding (yellow card) 71'; Kaká (yellow card) 75'	Report	Redding 9' (o.g.); Maund (yellow card) 25'; Shea 53'	Stadium: Orlando City Stadium; Attendance: 24,406; Referee: Hilario Grajeda

September 9, 2017 26	Whitecaps FC	3–2	Real Salt Lake	Vancouver, British Columbia
19:00 PDT	Parker (yellow card) 21'; Techera 29'; Waston 52'; Nerwinski (yellow card) 57'; Reyna 64'	Report	Wingert 37'; Beltran 83'; Plata (yellow card) 90+1'	Stadium: BC Place; Attendance: 20,783; Referee: Allen Chapman

September 13, 2017 27	Whitecaps FC	3–0	Minnesota United FC	Vancouver, British Columbia
19:00 PDT	Reyna 5'; Hurtado 31'; Shea 88'	Report	Boxall (yellow card) 45'; Warner (yellow card) 52'	Stadium: BC Place; Attendance: 17,368; Referee: David Gantar

September 16, 2017 28	Whitecaps FC	2–2	Columbus Crew	Vancouver, British Columbia
16:00 PDT	Montero 15'; Waston (yellow card) 56'; Tchani 90+2'	Report	Kamara 19'; Williams (yellow card) 26'; Abu (yellow card) 33'; Manneh 63'; Meram (yellow card) 90+1'	Stadium: BC Place; Attendance: 20,592; Referee: Silviu Petrescu

September 23, 2017 29	Whitecaps FC	2–1	Colorado Rapids	Vancouver, British Columbia
19:00 PDT	Montero 4'; Parker (yellow card) 34'; Reyna 54'	Report	Watts (yellow card) 14'; Williams (yellow card) 43'; Badji 45'; Azira (yellow card) 87'	Stadium: BC Place; Attendance: 22,120; Referee: José Carlos Rivero

September 27, 2017 30	Seattle Sounders FC	3–0	Whitecaps FC	Seattle
19:30 PDT	Rodríguez 17'; Alonso (yellow card) 35'; Lodeiro 62'; Dempsey 69'	Report	Reyna (yellow card) 24'; Waston (yellow card) 26'; Williams (yellow card) 90+1'; Tchani (red card) 90+2'	Stadium: CenturyLink Field; Attendance: 41,868; Referee: Robert Sibiga

September 30, 2017 31	Sporting Kansas City	0–1	Whitecaps FC	Kansas City, Kansas
18:00 PDT	Zusi (red card) 90+1'	Report	Hurtado 53'; Davies (yellow card) 69'; Bolaños (red card) 90+3'	Stadium: Children's Mercy Park; Attendance: 18,990; Referee: Baldomero Toledo

October 7, 2017 32	New York Red Bulls	3–0	Whitecaps FC	Harrison, New Jersey
14:00 PDT	Royer 33'; Wright-Phillips 58'; Felipe 72'; Lawrence (yellow card) 84'	Report	de Jong (yellow card) 51'	Stadium: Red Bull Arena; Attendance: 25,219; Referee: Jorge Gonzalez

October 15, 2017 33	Whitecaps FC	1–1	San Jose Earthquakes	Vancouver, British Columbia
16:30 PDT	Reyna 29'	Report	Qazaishvili 77'	Stadium: BC Place; Attendance: 22,120; Referee: Ismail Elfath

October 22, 2017 34	Portland Timbers	2–1	Whitecaps FC	Portland, Oregon
13:00 PDT	Ridgewell 32' (yellow card) 58'; Chara (yellow card) 45+5'; Mattocks 48'; Guzmán (yellow card) 81'	Report	Waston 29' (yellow card) 89'; Igiebor (yellow card) 31'; Harvey (yellow card) 33'	Stadium: Providence Park; Attendance: 21,144; Referee: Allen Chapman

=== Playoffs ===
==== Knockout Round ====
October 25, 2017 Knockout Round	Whitecaps FC	5–0	San Jose Earthquakes	Vancouver, British Columbia
19:30 PDT	Montero 33'; Techera 57'; Waston 64'; Mezquida 78', 80'	Report	Cerén (yellow card) 76'; Godoy (yellow card) 85'	Stadium: BC Place; Attendance: 21,083; Referee: Jose Carlos Rivero

==== Conference Semifinals ====
October 29, 2017 First Leg	Whitecaps FC	0–0	Seattle Sounders FC	Vancouver, British Columbia
17:30 PDT	Igiebor (yellow card) 45'; Ghazal (yellow card) 79'	Report	Roldan (yellow card) 87'	Stadium: BC Place; Attendance: 27,837; Referee: Kevin Stott

November 2, 2017 Second Leg	Seattle Sounders FC	2–0 (2–0 agg.)	Whitecaps FC	Seattle, Washington
19:30 PDT	Lodeiro (yellow card) 9'; Dempsey 56', 88'; Torres (yellow card) 68'	Report	Techera (yellow card) 38'; Montero (yellow card) 49'; Igiebor (yellow card) 58'; Waston (yellow card) 82'	Stadium: CenturyLink Field; Attendance: 39,587; Referee: Baldomero Toledo

== CONCACAF Champions League ==
=== Group stage ===
Pos	Team	Pld	W	D	L	GF	GA	GD	Pts	Qualification	VAN	SKC	CEN
1	(Canada) Vancouver Whitecaps FC	4	4	0	0	10	2	+8	12	Quarter-finals	—	3–0	4–1
2	(United States) Sporting Kansas City	4	1	1	2	6	8	−2	4		1–2	—	3–1
3	(Trinidad and Tobago) Central	4	0	1	3	4	10	−6	1		0–1	2–2	—

Source: CONCACAF

=== Knockout stage ===
==== Quarterfinals ====
February 22 First leg	New York Red Bulls (United States)	1–1	(Canada) Vancouver Whitecaps FC	Harrison, United States
20:00 PST	Wright-Phillips 61'; Kljestan (yellow card) 80'	Report	Manneh 39'; Parker (yellow card) 41'; Hurtado (yellow card) 55'; Techera (red card) 70'	Stadium: Red Bull Arena; Referee: César Arturo Ramos (Mexico)

March 2 Second leg	Vancouver Whitecaps FC (Canada)	2–0 (3–1 agg.)	(United States) New York Red Bulls	Vancouver, British Columbia
20:00 PST	Davies 5' (yellow card) 76'; Laba (yellow card) 36'; Teibert (yellow card) 57'; Montero 76'	Report	Collin (yellow card) 17'	Stadium: BC Place; Attendance: 14,183; Referee: Valdin Legister (Jamaica)

==== Semifinals ====
March 14 First leg	UANL (Mexico)	2–0	(Canada) Vancouver Whitecaps FC	San Nicolás de los Garza, Mexico
19:00 PDT	Waston 66' (o.g.); Vargas 87'	Report	de Jong (yellow card) 19'; Waston (yellow card) 22'; Shea (yellow card) 60'; Williams (yellow card) 64'	Stadium: Estadio Universitario; Attendance: 31,197; Referee: Óscar Moncada (Honduras)

April 5 Second leg	Vancouver Whitecaps FC (Canada)	1–2 (1–4 agg.)	(Mexico) UANL	Vancouver, British Columbia
19:00 PDT	Shea 3'; Laba (yellow card) 43'	Report	Gignac 63'; Álvarez 84'	Stadium: BC Place; Attendance: 16,258; Referee: Javier Santos (Puerto Rico)

== Canadian Championship ==
May 23, 2017 Semifinal	Whitecaps FC	2–1	Montreal Impact	Vancouver, British Columbia
19:00 (PDT)	Davies 13'; Mezquida 33'	Report	Choinière 62'	Stadium: BC Place; Attendance: 16,831; Referee: Drew Fischer

May 30, 2017 Semifinal	Montreal Impact	4–2 (5–4 agg.)	Whitecaps FC	Montreal
16:30 (PDT)	Piatti 20' (pen.), 28' (pen.); Dzemaili 38'; Donadel (yellow card) 43'; Jackson-Hamel 61'; Duvall (yellow card) 80'; Ciman (yellow card) 90+3'	Report	Richey (yellow card) 19'; Davies 59'; Grieg 77'	Stadium: Stade Saputo; Attendance: 15,213; Referee: David Barrie

== Playing statistics ==
As of November 2, 2017

Appearances (Apps.) numbers are for appearances in competitive games only including sub appearances
Red card numbers denote: Numbers in parentheses represent red cards overturned for wrongful dismissal.

No.	Nat.	Player	Pos.	MLS				Canadian Championship				Champions League				Total			
No.	Nat.	Player	Pos.	Apps	Goal	Yellow card	Red card	Apps	Goal	Yellow card	Red card	Apps	Goal	Yellow card	Red card	Apps	Goal	Yellow card	Red card
1	(Denmark)	David Ousted	GK	28		2	1					4				32		2	1
2	(United States)	Jordan Harvey	DF	29	1	3						4				33	1	3	
4	(Costa Rica)	Kendall Waston	DF	28	5	8						4		1		32	5	9	
6	(Canada)	David Edgar	DF																
7	(Costa Rica)	Christian Bolaños	MF	23			1					2				25			1
8	(United States)	Andrew Jacobson	MF	22	2	2						3				25	2	2	
11	(Uruguay)	Nicolás Mezquida	MF	22	4	1		2	1			1				25	5	1	
12	(Colombia)	Fredy Montero	FW	36	14	7						3	1			39	15	7	
13	(Uruguay)	Cristian Techera	MF	32	7	2		1				3			1	36	7	2	1
14	(United States)	Cole Seiler	DF					2								2			
15	(Argentina)	Matías Laba	MF	19	2	6	1					4		2		23	2	8	1
16	(Cameroon)	Tony Tchani	MF	29	4	6	2					1				30	4	6	2
17	(Canada)	Marcel de Jong	MF	16		1		2				2		1		20		2	
18	(United States)	Spencer Richey	GK	1				2		1						3		1	
19	(United States)	Erik Hurtado	FW	15	3							1		1		16	3	1	
20	(United States)	Brek Shea	MF	28	4	3	1	2				3	1	1		33	5	4	1
22	(United States)	Aaron Maund	DF	2		1										2		1	
23	(Australia)	Bernie Ibini-Isei	FW	17	1											17	1		
24	(New Zealand)	Stefan Marinovic	GK	8												8			
25	(United States)	Sheanon Williams	DF	15		3						3		1		18		4	
26	(United States)	Tim Parker	DF	35	1	4		1				4		1		40	1	5	
28	(United States)	Jake Nerwinski	DF	22		2		2				2				26		2	
29	(Peru)	Yordy Reyna	MF	22	6	3										22	6	3	
31	(Canada)	Russell Teibert	MF	12		1		2				2		1		16		2	
32	(Canada)	Marco Bustos	MF					2								2			
46	(Canada)	Brett Levis	DF																
50	(Nigeria)	Nosa Igiebor	MF	3		3										2		2	
66	(Egypt)	Ali Ghazal	MF	10		1										10		1	
67	(Canada)	Alphonso Davies	MF	27		1		2	2			4	1	1		33	3	2	
77	(Argentina)	Mauro Rosales	MF	5				2								7			
3	(Canada)	Sam Adekugbe (Note: Loaned out for remainder of the season.)	DF																
27	(Honduras)	Deybi Flores	MF																
30	(Canada)	Ben McKendry	MF	1				2								3			
47	(United States)	Kyle Greig	FW	1				2	1			2				5	1		
--	(Netherlands)	Sem de Wit (Note: Signed to a short term contract for the Canadian Championship.)	DF					1								1			
--	(New Zealand)	Deklan Wynne	DF					1								1			
--	(Jamaica)	Giles Barnes (Note: No longer with team.)	FW									1				1			
--	(United States)	Christian Dean	DF	3		1										3		1	
--	(The Gambia)	Kekuta Manneh	MF	3								2	1			5	1		
--	(Italy)	Paolo Tornaghi	GK	1												1			
Own goals					1				0				0				1		
Totals					53	60	6		4	1	0		4	10	1		61	71	7

Source: (for players and positions) First Team Squad (for squad numbers) (for actual stats.)
