= 2018 Vancouver Whitecaps FC season =

Vancouver Whitecaps FC 2018 soccer season

Vancouver Whitecaps FC
- Chairman: John Furlong
- Head coach: Craig Dalrymple (acting)
- Stadium: BC Place (Capacity: 22,120)
- Major League Soccer: Conference: 8th Overall: 14th
- MLS Cup Playoffs: Did not qualify
- Canadian Championship: Runner-Up
- Top goalscorer: League: Kei Kamara (14); All: Kei Kamara (17)
- Highest home attendance: 28,837 (vs. Montreal Impact, March 4, 2018)
- Lowest home attendance: 17,357 (vs. San Jose Earthquakes, May 16, 2018)
Home colours	Away colours

The 2018 Vancouver Whitecaps FC season was the club's eighth season in Major League Soccer, the top division of soccer in the United States and Canada. Including previous iterations of the franchise, this was the 41st season of professional soccer being played in Vancouver under a variation of the "Whitecaps" name.

Outside of MLS, the Whitecaps played in the 2018 Canadian Championship. They defeated the Montreal Impact 2–1 on aggregate in the semifinals before falling 7–4 on aggregate to Toronto FC in the finals.

On September 25, with five games remaining in the season the Whitecaps released head coach Carl Robinson along with assistant coaches Martyn Pert, Gordon Forrest and goalkeeper coach Stewart Kerr. Whitecaps Academy technical director Craig Dalrymple was named acting coach for the remainder of the season.

== Roster ==
As of September 6, 2018

No.	Player	Nationality	Position	Date of birth (age)	Previous club
Goalkeepers
1	Stefan Marinovic	(New Zealand)	GK	October 7, 1991 (age 35)	(Germany) SpVgg Unterhaching
12	Brian Rowe	(United States)	GK	November 16, 1988 (age 37)	(United States) LA Galaxy
18	Spencer Richey (on loan at FC Cincinnati)	(United States)	GK	May 30, 1992 (age 34)	(Canada) Whitecaps FC 2
39	Sean Melvin	(Canada)	GK	July 9, 1994 (age 32)	(United States) Fresno FC
Defenders
2	Doneil Henry	(Canada)	DF	April 20, 1993 (age 33)	(England) West Ham United
3	Sean Franklin	(United States)	DF	March 21, 1985 (age 41)	(United States) D.C. United
4	Kendall Waston	(Costa Rica)	DF	January 1, 1988 (age 38)	(Costa Rica) Deportivo Saprissa
15	Roberto Domínguez	(El Salvador)	DF	May 9, 1997 (age 29)	(El Salvador) Santa Tecla
17	Marcel de Jong	(Canada)	DF	October 15, 1986 (age 40)	(Canada) Ottawa Fury
18	José Aja	(Uruguay)	DF	May 10, 1993 (age 33)	(United States) Orlando City SC
22	Aaron Maund	(United States)	DF	September 19, 1990 (age 36)	(United States) Real Salt Lake
28	Jake Nerwinski	(United States)	DF	October 17, 1994 (age 32)	(United States) Connecticut Huskies
46	Brett Levis	(Canada)	DF	May 29, 1993 (age 33)	(Canada) Whitecaps FC 2
Midfielders
6	Efraín Juárez	(Mexico)	MF	February 22, 1988 (age 38)	(Mexico) C.F. Monterrey
8	Felipe	(Brazil)	DF	September 30, 1990 (age 36)	(United States) New York Red Bulls
11	Nicolás Mezquida	(Uruguay)	MF	January 21, 1992 (age 34)	(Uruguay) Fénix
13	Cristian Techera	(Uruguay)	MF	May 31, 1992 (age 34)	(Uruguay) River Plate Montevideo
20	Brek Shea	(United States)	MF	February 28, 1990 (age 36)	(United States) Orlando City SC
24	David Norman Jr. (on loan at Queen of the South F.C.)	(Canada)	MF	May 31, 1998 (age 28)	(Canada) Whitecaps FC 2
29	Yordy Reyna	(Peru)	MF	September 16, 1993 (age 33)	(Austria) Red Bull Salzburg
31	Russell Teibert	(Canada)	MF	December 22, 1992 (age 33)	(Canada) Vancouver Whitecaps (USSF-D2)
54	Simon Colyn	(Canada)	MF	March 23, 2002 (age 24)	(Canada) Vancouver Whitecaps FC Residency
65	Michael Baldisimo	(Canada)	MF	April 13, 2000 (age 26)	(Canada) Vancouver Whitecaps FC Residency
66	Ali Ghazal	(Egypt)	MF	February 1, 1992 (age 34)	(China) Guizhou Zhicheng
67	Alphonso Davies	(Canada)	MF	November 2, 2000 (age 26)	(Canada) Whitecaps FC 2
77	Jordon Mutch	(England)	MF	December 2, 1991 (age 34)	(England) Crystal Palace
Forwards
9	Anthony Blondell	(Venezuela)	FW	May 17, 1994 (age 32)	(Venezuela) Monagas SC
14	Marvin Emnes	(Netherlands)	FW	May 27, 1988 (age 38)	(Turkey) Akhisar Belediyespor
19	Erik Hurtado	(United States)	FW	May 11, 1990 (age 36)	(United States) Santa Clara
23	Kei Kamara	(Sierra Leone)	FW	September 1, 1984 (age 42)	(United States) New England Revolution
45	Myer Bevan (on loan at Fresno FC)	(New Zealand)	FW	April 23, 1997 (age 29)	(Canada) Whitecaps FC 2
50	Theo Bair	(Canada)	FW	August 27, 1999 (age 27)	(Canada) Vancouver Whitecaps FC Residency

=== Transfers ===
==== In ====
No.	Pos.	Player	Transferred from	Fee/notes	Date	Ref.
47	FW	(United States) Kyle Greig	(United States) FC Cincinnati	Loan Return	November 27, 2017	
30	MF	(Canada) Ben McKendry	(Canada) FC Edmonton	Loan Return	November 27, 2017	
3	DF	(Canada) Sam Adekugbe	(Sweden) IFK Göteborg	Loan Return	November 27, 2017	
9	FW	(Venezuela) Anthony Blondell	(Venezuela) Monagas SC	Undisclosed	November 30, 2017	
42	MF	(Canada) David Norman Jr.	(Canada) Whitecaps FC 2	Homegrown player	December 1, 2017	
23	FW	(Sierra Leone) Kei Kamara	(United States) New England Revolution	Traded in exchange for a 2019 first-round and a 2020 conditional second-round picks	December 10, 2017	
45	FW	(New Zealand) Myer Bevan	(Canada) Whitecaps FC 2	Free	December 13, 2017	
12	GK	(United States) Brian Rowe	(United States) LA Galaxy	Traded in exchange for a 2018 second-round pick	December 15, 2017	
	DF	(New Zealand) Deklan Wynne	(Canada) Whitecaps FC 2	Free	December 21, 2017	
2	DF	(Canada) Doneil Henry	(England) West Ham United	Free	December 22, 2017	
6	MF	(Mexico) Efraín Juárez	(Mexico) C.F. Monterrey	Undisclosed	January 18, 2018	
3	DF	(United States) Sean Franklin	(United States) D.C. United	Free	February 22, 2018	
18	DF	(Uruguay) José Aja	(United States) Orlando City SC	Traded in exchange for $125,000 TAM and future considerations	February 24, 2018	
77	MF	(England) Jordon Mutch	(England) Crystal Palace	Loan	March 2, 2018	
8	MF	(Brazil) Felipe	(United States) New York Red Bulls	Traded with $500,000 allocation money and an international roster spot in exchange for Tim Parker	March 2, 2018	
25	DF	(United States) Justin Fiddes	(United States) Washington Huskies	2018 MLS SuperDraft	March 8, 2018	
39	GK	(Canada) Sean Melvin	(United States) Fresno FC	Homegrown player	April 2, 2018	
54	MF	(Canada) Simon Colyn	(Canada) Vancouver Whitecaps FC Residency	Homegrown player	April 19, 2018	
2	DF	(Canada) Doneil Henry	(Canada) Ottawa Fury FC	Loan Return	May 31, 2018	
45	FW	(New Zealand) Myer Bevan	(Sweden) Husqvarna FF	Loan Return	July 3, 2018	
65	MF	(Canada) Michael Baldisimo	(Canada) Vancouver Whitecaps FC Residency	Homegrown player	July 17, 2018	
50	FW	(Canada) Theo Bair	(Canada) Vancouver Whitecaps FC Residency	Homegrown player	July 17, 2018	
32	MF	(Canada) Marco Bustos	(Mexico) Atlético Zacatepec	Loan Return	August 14, 2018	
15	DF	(El Salvador) Roberto Domínguez	(El Salvador) Santa Tecla	Free	August 17, 2018	
14	FW	(Netherlands) Marvin Emnes	(Turkey) Akhisar Belediyespor	Free	September 6, 2018	

==== Out ====
Pos.	Player	Transferred to	Fee/notes	Date	Ref.
GK	(United States) Spencer Richey	(United States) FC Cincinnati	Loan	November 22, 2017	
MF	(Costa Rica) Christian Bolaños (Note: After his release, Bolaños signed with Deportivo Saprissa.)		Option Declined	November 27, 2017	
DF	(Canada) David Edgar (Note: After his release, Edgar signed with Nashville SC.)		Option Declined	November 27, 2017	
FW	(United States) Kyle Greig (Note: After his release, Greig signed with Saint Louis FC.)		Option Declined	November 27, 2017	
MF	(Nigeria) Nosa Igiebor (Note: After his release, Igiebor signed with Anorthosis Famagusta.)		Option Declined	November 27, 2017	
MF	(Argentina) Matías Laba (Note: After his release, Laba signed with Estudiantes.)		Option Declined	November 27, 2017	
MF	(Canada) Ben McKendry (Note: After his release, McKendry signed with TPS.)		Option Declined	November 27, 2017	
GK	(Denmark) David Ousted (Note: After his release, Ousted's rights were traded to D.C. United in exchange for a second-round pick in the 2018 MLS SuperDraft.)		Option Declined	November 27, 2017	
MF	(Argentina) Mauro Rosales		Option Declined	November 27, 2017	
DF	(United States) Cole Seiler (Note: After his release, Seiler signed with Sacramento Republic FC.)		Option Declined	November 27, 2017	
DF	(United States) Sheanon Williams (Note: After his release, Williams signed with LA Galaxy.)		Option Declined	November 27, 2017	
DF	(United States) Jordan Harvey (Note: As a free agent, Harvey signed with Los Angeles FC.)		end of contract	November 27, 2017	
MF	(United States) Andrew Jacobson	retired	end of contract	November 27, 2017	
DF	(New Zealand) Deklan Wynne	(United States) Colorado Rapids	Traded in exchange for $100,000 TAM	December 21, 2017	
FW	(Colombia) Fredy Montero	(China) Tianjin TEDA	Loan Return	December 31, 2017	
DF	(Canada) Sam Adekugbe	(Norway) Vålerenga	Undisclosed	January 8, 2018	
MF	(Canada) Marco Bustos	(Mexico) Atlético Zacatepec	Loan	January 10, 2018	
MF	(Cameroon) Tony Tchani	(United States) Chicago Fire	Traded in exchange for $150,000 TAM	February 28, 2018	
DF	(United States) Tim Parker	(United States) New York Red Bulls	Traded in exchange for Felipe, $500,000 allocation money and an international roster spot	March 2, 2018	
FW	(New Zealand) Myer Bevan	(Sweden) Husqvarna FF	Loan	March 28, 2018	
DF	(Canada) Doneil Henry	(Canada) Ottawa Fury FC	Loan	April 25, 2018	
DF	(United States) Justin Fiddes	(United States) Fresno FC	Loan	May 1, 2018	
DF	(United States) Justin Fiddes		Waived	July 2, 2018	
MF	(Honduras) Deybi Flores		Waived	July 2, 2018	
FW	(Australia) Bernie Ibini-Isei	(United Arab Emirates) Emirates Club	Mutual contract termination	August 8, 2018	
FW	(New Zealand) Myer Bevan	(United States) Fresno FC	Loan	August 8, 2018	
MF	(Canada) Marco Bustos	(United States) OKC Energy FC	Mutual contract termination	August 15, 2018	
MF	(Canada) David Norman Jr.	(Scotland) Queen of the South	Loan	September 1, 2018	

== Major League Soccer ==
=== Preseason ===
February 6, 2018	Whitecaps FC	4–0	Hokkaido Consadole Sapporo	Honolulu, Hawaii
17:30 (PST)	Parker 32', 44'; Kamara 40'; Ibini-Isei 90+1'	Report		Stadium: University of Hawaii Training Center

February 8, 2018	Whitecaps FC	1–0	Iwaki FC	Honolulu, Hawaii
19:00 (PST)	Techera 90' (pen.)	Report	Suzuki (yellow card) 84'	Stadium: Aloha Stadium

February 10, 2018	Whitecaps FC	0–1	Hokkaido Consadole Sapporo	Honolulu, Hawaii
21:00 (PST)		Report	Tokura 85'	Stadium: Aloha Stadium

February 17, 2018	Las Vegas Lights FC	2–3	Whitecaps FC	Las Vegas, Nevada
20:00 (PST)	Alatorre (red card) 57'; Calderón 66', 68' (pen.)	Report	Techera 13'; Davies 18'; Kamara 74' (pen.)	Stadium: Cashman Field; Attendance: 6,04

February 18, 2018	Los Angeles FC	4–4	Whitecaps FC	Los Angeles, California
17:00 (PST)	Vela 3', 78' (pen.); Blessing 46'; Nerwinski 84' (o.g.)	Report	Blondell 10', 29'; Reyna 38', 52'	Stadium: Drake Stadium

February 21, 2018	LA Galaxy	0–2	Whitecaps FC	Carson, California
11:00 (PST)		Report	Blondell 33', (yellow card) 35'; Kamara 63'	Stadium: StubHub Center

February 24, 2018	LA Galaxy	1–2	Whitecaps FC	Carson, California
19:00 (PST)	Skjelvik (yellow card) 12'; Alessandrini (yellow card) 49'; G. dos Santos 66' (pen.)	Report	Juárez (yellow card) 7'; Kamara 20' (pen.); Davies 52'; Marinovic (yellow card) 90'	Stadium: StubHub Center; Referee: David Gantar

=== Regular season ===
==== League tables ====
===== Western Conference =====
Pos	Team	Pld	W	L	T	GF	GA	GD	Pts	Qualification
6	Real Salt Lake	34	14	13	7	55	58	−3	49	Qualification for the knockout round
7	LA Galaxy	34	13	12	9	66	64	+2	48	
8	Vancouver Whitecaps FC	34	13	13	8	54	67	−13	47	
9	Houston Dynamo	34	10	16	8	58	58	0	38	
10	Minnesota United FC	34	11	20	3	49	71	−22	36	

Source: MLS

===== Overall =====
Pos	Team	Pld	W	L	T	GF	GA	GD	Pts
12	Real Salt Lake	34	14	13	7	55	58	−3	49
13	LA Galaxy	34	13	12	9	66	64	+2	48
14	Vancouver Whitecaps FC	34	13	13	8	54	67	−13	47
15	Montreal Impact	34	14	16	4	47	53	−6	46
16	New England Revolution	34	10	13	11	49	55	−6	41

Source: MLS
Rules for classification: 1) points; 2) total wins; 3) total goal differential; 4) total goals scored; 5) disciplinary points; 6) away goals scored; 7) away goal differential; 8) coin toss or drawing of lots

==== Results ====
Overall								Home						Away					
Pld	Pts	W	L	D	GF	GA	GD	W	L	D	GF	GA	GD	W	L	D	GF	GA	GD
34	47	13	13	8	54	67	−13	7	5	5	32	29	+3	6	8	3	22	38	−16

Last updated: October 28, 2018
Pld = Matches played; Pts = Points; W = Matches won; T = Matches tied; L = Matches lost; GF = Goals for; GA = Goals against; GD = Goal difference

Round	1	2	3	4	5	6	7	8	9	10	11	12	13	14	15	16	17	18	19	20	21	22	23	24	25	26	27	28	29	30	31	32	33	34
Ground	H	A	A	H	A	A	H	A	H	A	H	H	A	H	A	H	A	H	H	A	A	H	A	A	H	A	H	H	H	A	A	H	A	H
Result	W	W	L	D	W	L	L	L	W	L	D	D	D	D	W	W	L	L	W	L	L	W	D	W	D	W	W	L	L	L	W	L	D	W

Updated to match(es) played on September 23, 2018. Source:
A = Away; H = Home; W = Win; D = Draw; L = Loss

March 4, 2018 1	Whitecaps FC	2–1	Montreal Impact	Vancouver
15:00 (PST)	Juárez (yellow card) 11'; Waston (yellow card) 37'; Kamara 63'; Davies 70'	Report	Cabrera (yellow card) 32'; Mancosu 81', (yellow card) 90+2'	Stadium: BC Place; Attendance: 28,837; Referee: Drew Fischer

March 10, 2018 2	Houston Dynamo	1–2	Whitecaps FC	Houston, Texas
15:00 (PST)	Senderos (yellow card) 29'; Elis 39'; Cerén (yellow card) 65'	Report	Teibert (yellow card) 12'; Kamara 28' (pen.); Shea 49'; Marinovic (yellow card) 88'	Stadium: BBVA Compass Stadium; Attendance: 16,082; Referee: Ted Unkel

March 17, 2018 3	Atlanta United FC	4–1	Whitecaps FC	Atlanta, Georgia
16:30 PDT	Martínez 15' (pen.), 60', 88'; Larentowicz (yellow card) 45+3'; Maund 58' (o.g.)	Report	Waston (red card) 13'; Juárez (yellow card) 13'; Aja (yellow card) 60'; Reyna (yellow card) 72'; Hurtado 85'	Stadium: Mercedes-Benz Stadium; Attendance: 45,003; Referee: Ismail Elfath

March 24, 2018 4	Whitecaps FC	0–0	LA Galaxy	Vancouver
19:00 PDT		Report	Feltscher (yellow card) 53'	Stadium: BC Place; Attendance: 22,120; Referee: Fotis Bazakos

March 31, 2018 5	Columbus Crew SC	1–2	Whitecaps FC	Columbus, Ohio
12:00 PDT	Zardes 29'; Valenzuela (yellow card) 76'	Report	de Jong (yellow card) 10'; Shea 51'; Kamara 78'; Felipe (yellow card) 82'	Stadium: Mapfre Stadium; Attendance: 8,922; Referee: Juan Carlos Rivero

April 7, 2018 6	Real Salt Lake	2–1	Whitecaps FC	Sandy, Utah
18:30 PDT	Henley (yellow card) 17'; M. Silva (yellow card) 28'; L. Silva 45+4'; Glad (yellow card) 56'; Lennon (yellow card) 75'; Savarino 88'	Report	Waston (yellow card) 78'; Shea 90+2'	Stadium: Rio Tinto Stadium; Attendance: 16,015; Referee: Marcos de Oliveira

April 13, 2018 7	Whitecaps FC	0–2	Los Angeles FC	Vancouver
19:00 PDT	Nerwinski (yellow card) 62'; Techera (yellow card) 89'	Report	Vela 59', (yellow card) 90+1'; Rossi 70'; Kaye (yellow card) 78'	Stadium: BC Place; Attendance: 22,120; Referee: Robert Sibiga

April 20, 2018 8	Sporting Kansas City	6–0	Whitecaps FC	Kansas City, Missouri
18:00 PDT	Russell 10', 16', 48', (yellow card) 40'; Medranda 30'; Lobato 54'; Croizet 77'	Report	Waston (yellow card) 36'; Juárez (red card) 40'; Reyna (red card) 40'	Stadium: Children's Mercy Park; Attendance: 19,690; Referee: Kevin Stott

April 27, 2018 9	Whitecaps FC	2–0	Real Salt Lake	Vancouver
19:30 PDT	Techera (yellow card) 72' (yellow-red card) 76', (goal) 75' (pen.); Blondell 79'; Marinovic (yellow card) 90+1'; Waston (yellow card) 90+5'	Report		Stadium: BC Place; Attendance: 19,283; Referee: Sorin Stoica

May 5, 2018 10	Minnesota United FC	1–0	Whitecaps FC	Minneapolis, Minnesota
11:00 PDT	Quintero (yellow card) 26'; Mason Toye (red card) 50'; Miguel Ibarra 60'; Shuttleworth (yellow card) 90+1'	Report	Ali Ghazal (yellow card) 20'; José Aja (yellow card) 66'	Stadium: TCF Bank Stadium; Attendance: 19,642; Referee: Nima Saghafi

May 11, 2018 11	Whitecaps FC	2–2	Houston Dynamo	Vancouver
7:30 PM PDT	Aja 44'; Kamara (yellow card) 61'; Waston 90+4'	Report	Martínez 35', (yellow card) 90'; O. García (yellow card) 64'; Álvarez (yellow card) 88'; Manotas 90'	Stadium: BC Place; Attendance: 18,813; Referee: Hilario Grajeda

May 16, 2018 12	Whitecaps FC	2–2	San Jose Earthquakes	Vancouver
19:30 PDT	Techera 19'; Reyna 64'	Report	Hoesen 19'; Lima 53'; Godoy (yellow card) 73'; Jungwirth (yellow card) 73'	Stadium: BC Place; Attendance: 17,357; Referee: Armando Villarreal

May 19, 2018 13	FC Dallas	2–2	Whitecaps FC	Dallas, Texas
13:00 PDT	Cannon 40'; Hedges (yellow card) 47'; Díaz (yellow card) 54'; Urruti 78'; Maurer (yellow card) 90+8'	Report	Felipe (yellow card) 16'; Aja (yellow card) 68'; Figueroa 82' (o.g.); Kamara 90+10' (pen.)	Stadium: Toyota Stadium; Attendance: 13,907; Referee: Ted Unkel

May 26, 2018 14	Whitecaps FC	3–3	New England Revolution	Vancouver
14:30 PDT	Reyna (yellow card) 17'; Kamara (yellow card) 30'; Techera 49', 51', 74'	Report	Bunbury (yellow card) 11', (goal) 59'; Ghazal 26' (o.g.); Penilla 48'	Stadium: BC Place; Attendance: 22,120; Referee: Joseph Dickerson

June 1, 2018 15	Colorado Rapids	1–2	Whitecaps FC	Commerce City, Colorado
18:00 PDT	Castillo 41', (yellow card) 46'; Badji (yellow card) 79'; Price (yellow card) 90+5'	Report	Techera 17'; Nerwinski (yellow card) 34'; Reyna 39'	Stadium: Dick's Sporting Goods Park; Attendance: 16,746; Referee: Baldomero Toledo

June 9, 2018 16	Whitecaps FC	5–2	Orlando City SC	Vancouver
16:00 PDT	Shea (yellow card) 33'; Kamara 36', 85' (pen.); Aja (yellow card) 70'; Davies 76'; Reyna 87'; Mezquida 90'	Report	Johnson (yellow card) 12'; El Monir (yellow card) 27' (red card) 58'; Higuita (yellow card) 45'; Allen (yellow card) 50'; Kljestan 64'; Dwyer 90+4'	Stadium: BC Place; Attendance: 22,120; Referee: Jose Carlos Rivero

June 23, 2018 17	Philadelphia Union	4–0	Whitecaps FC	Chester, Pennsylvania
14:00 PDT	Dockal 23', 71'; Picault (yellow card) 31', (goal) 90+5' (pen.); Ilsinho 74' (pen.)	Report	Aja (red card) 72'; Reyna (yellow card) 82' (red card) 90+4'; Blondell (yellow card) 83'	Stadium: Talen Energy Stadium; Attendance: 15,250; Referee: Allen Chapman

July 1, 2018 18	Whitecaps FC	0–1	Colorado Rapids	Vancouver
16:00 PDT	de Jong (yellow card) 90+3'	Report	Price (yellow card) 16'; Castillo (yellow card) 33'; de Jong 43' (o.g.); Wilson (yellow card) 48'; Blomberg (yellow card) 80'; Wynne (yellow card) 82'	Stadium: BC Place; Attendance: 21,038; Referee: Nima Saghafi

July 7, 2018 19	Whitecaps FC	3–2	Chicago Fire	Vancouver
19:30 PDT	Kamara 28', 72'; Mutch 47'	Report	Vincent (yellow card) 10'; Nikolic 42'31; Katai (yellow card) 67'; Tchani 81'	Stadium: BC Place; Attendance: 22,210; Referee: Robert Sibiga

July 14, 2018 20	D.C. United	3–1	Whitecaps FC	Washington, D.C.
17:00 PDT	Arriola (yellow card) 12', (goal) 69', 80'; Asad 27'; Brillant (yellow card) 31'	Report	Juárez (yellow card) 38'; Felipe (yellow card) 62'; Davies 90+4'	Stadium: Audi Field; Attendance: 20,504; Referee: Hilario Grajeda

July 21, 2018 21	Seattle Sounders FC	2–0	Whitecaps FC	Seattle, Washington
13:00 PDT	Lodeiro 5' (pen.), 31'; Nouhou (yellow card) 17'	Report	Henry (yellow card) 16'; Waston (yellow card) 63'; Kamara (yellow card) 74'; Juárez (yellow card) 77', (red card) 77'	Stadium: CenturyLink Field; Attendance: 41,849; Referee: Chris Penso

July 28, 2018 22	Whitecaps FC	4–2	Minnesota United FC	Vancouver
19:00 PDT	Reyna 35'; Davies 56', 89'; Kamara 64'; Waston (yellow card) 72'	Report	Boxall (yellow card) 39'; Miller (yellow card) 50'; Ibson 82'; Danladi 87'	Stadium: BC Place; Attendance: 20,831; Referee: David Gantar

August 4, 2018 23	New York City FC	2–2	Whitecaps FC	New York, New York
17:00 PDT	Medina 45+1'; Castellanos 46'; Matarrita (yellow card) 55'; Moralez (yellow card) 68'; Callens (yellow card) 89'	Report	Mezquida 22'; Hurtado 87'	Stadium: Yankee Stadium; Attendance: 20,802; Referee: JC Rivero

August 11, 2018 24	Portland Timbers	1–2	Whitecaps FC	Portland, Oregon
20:00 PDT	Valeri 71' (pen.); Guzmán (yellow card) 74'	Report	Kamara 14'; Techera 43', (yellow card) 45+1'; Shea (yellow card) 50'	Stadium: Providence Park; Attendance: 21,114; Referee: Jair Marrufo

August 18, 2018 25	Whitecaps FC	2–2	New York Red Bulls	Vancouver
16:00 PDT	Waston 42', 60'; Shea (yellow card) 51'; Reyna (yellow card) 71'	Report	Royer 5', 90'; Gamarra (yellow card) 61'; Murillo (yellow card) 69' (red card) 84'; Ivan (yellow card) 79'	Stadium: BC Place; Attendance: 22,120; Referee: Joseph Dickerson

August 25, 2018 26	San Jose Earthquakes	2–3	Whitecaps FC	San Jose, California
19:00 PDT	Hyka 7'; Eriksson 18' (pen.); Godoy (yellow card) 30'	Report	Reyna (yellow card) 51', (goal) 59'; Felipe (yellow card) 52'; de Jong (yellow card) 52'; Techera 61'; Kamara 68'	Stadium: Avaya Stadium; Attendance: 16,326; Referee: Baldomero Toledo

September 1, 2018 27	Whitecaps FC	2–1	San Jose Earthquakes	Vancouver
19:00 PDT	Davies 22'; Techera (yellow card) 63'; Reyna (yellow card) 67'; Mezquida 78'	Report	Lima (yellow card) 42'; Eriksson (yellow card) 83'; Qazaishvili 90+1'	Stadium: BC Place; Attendance: 22,120; Referee: Mark Geiger

September 15, 2018 28	Whitecaps FC	1–2	Seattle Sounders FC	Vancouver
19:00 PDT	Kamera 45+4', (yellow card) 90+6'; Teibert (yellow card) 48'	Preview	Ruidíaz 21', 42'; Alonso (yellow card) 41'; Leerdam (yellow card) 59'	Stadium: BC Place; Attendance: 27,863; Referee: Robert Sibiga

September 23, 2018 29	Whitecaps FC	1–2	FC Dallas	Vancouver
16:00 PDT	Teibert (yellow card) 37'; Kamara 66'; Techera (yellow card) 90'	Report	Pedroso (yellow card) 20'; Mosquera 42'; Barrios (yellow card) 75'; Hedges 87'	Stadium: BC Place; Attendance: 21,190; Referee: Alan Kelly

September 29, 2018 30	LA Galaxy	3–0	Whitecaps FC	Carson, California
19:00 PDT	Ibrahimovic 4' (pen.), 58'; Feltscher (yellow card) 37'; Alessandrini 77' (pen.)	Report	Techera (yellow card) 90+3'	Stadium: StubHub Center; Attendance: 25,659; Referee: Baldomero Toledo

October 6, 2018 31	Toronto FC	1–2	Whitecaps FC	Toronto, Ontario
14:00 PDT	van der Wiel (yellow card) 28' (red card) 66'; Mavinga (yellow card) 45+1'; Altidore 73' (pen.)	Report	Teibert 4'; Ghazal (yellow card) 34'; Reyna (yellow card) 76'; Kamara 78'; Marinovic (yellow card) 90'	Stadium: BMO Field; Attendance: 23,886; Referee: José Carlos Rivero

October 17, 2018 32	Whitecaps FC	1–4	Sporting Kansas City	Vancouver
19:00 PDT	Felipe 42'	Boxscore	Sinovic (yellow card) 53'; Croizet 62'; Sallói 82', 90+7'; Busio 90+4'	Stadium: BC Place; Attendance: 18,689; Referee: Armando Villarreal

October 21, 2018 33	Los Angeles FC	2–2	Whitecaps FC	Los Angeles, California
14:00 PDT	Rossi 5', 15'; Feilhaber (yellow card) 32'	Report	Reyna 22' (pen.), (yellow card) 52'; Davies (yellow card) 62'; Mutch 65', (yellow card) 90+2'	Stadium: Banc of California Stadium; Attendance: 22,000; Referee: Nima Saghafi

October 28, 2018 34	Whitecaps FC	2–1	Portland Timbers	Vancouver
13:30 PDT	Davies 28', 31', (yellow card) 82'	Report	Melano (yellow card) 27'; Flores 90'	Stadium: BC Place; Attendance: 25,348; Referee: Ted Unkel

== Canadian Championship ==
July 18, 2018 Semi-Final	Montreal Impact	1–0	Whitecaps FC	Montreal, Quebec
16:30 (PDT)	Silva 58'	Report	Norman Jr. (yellow card) 41'; Shea (yellow card) 87'	Stadium: Stade Saputo; Referee: Yusri Rudolf

July 25, 2018 Semi-Final	Whitecaps FC	2–0 (2–1 agg.)	Montreal Impact	Vancouver
19:00 (PDT)	Reyna 19'; Waston (yellow card) 21'; Henry (yellow card) 33'; Kamara 60' (pen.)	Report	Silva (yellow card) 65'; Piette (yellow card) 90+1'	Stadium: BC Place; Attendance: 19,267; Referee: David Barrie

August 8, 2018 Final	Whitecaps FC	2–2	Toronto FC	Vancouver
19:00 (PDT)	Kamara 24' (pen.); Felipe (red card) 45+1'; Hurtado 84'	Report	Osorio 26'; Morrow (yellow card) 78'; Henry 90+6' (o.g.)	Stadium: BC Place; Attendance: 16,833; Referee: David Gantar

August 15, 2018 Final	Toronto FC	5–2 (7–4 agg.)	Whitecaps FC	Toronto, Ontario
16:45 (PDT)	Altidore 39', 49', 53'; Giovinco 44'; Ricketts 80'	Report	Kamara 63'; Shea 77'	Stadium: BMO Field; Attendance: 14,994; Referee: Drew Fischer

== Playing statistics ==
As of October 28, 2018

Appearances (Apps.) numbers are for appearances in competitive games only including sub appearances
Red card numbers denote: Numbers in parentheses represent red cards overturned for wrongful dismissal.

No.	Nat.	Player	Pos.	MLS				Canadian Championship				Total			
No.	Nat.	Player	Pos.	Apps	Goal	Yellow card	Red card	Apps	Goal	Yellow card	Red card	Apps	Goal	Yellow card	Red card
1	(New Zealand)	Stefan Marinovic	GK	23		3		4				27		3	
2	(Canada)	Doneil Henry	DF	14		1		3		1		17		2	
3	(United States)	Sean Franklin	DF	11				1				12			
4	(Costa Rica)	Kendall Waston	DF	26	3	6	1 (1)	3		1		29	3	7	1 (1)
6	(Mexico)	Efraín Juárez	MF	16		4	2	1				17		4	2
8	(Brazil)	Felipe	MF	29	1	4		1			1	30	1	4	1
9	(Venezuela)	Anthony Blondell	FW	18	1	1		2				20	1	1	
11	(Uruguay)	Nicolás Mezquida	MF	21	3			3				24	3		
12	(United States)	Brian Rowe	GK	10								10			
13	(Uruguay)	Cristian Techera	MF	21	8	7	1	4				25	8	7	1
14	(Netherlands)	Marvin Emnes	FW												
15	(El Salvador)	Roberto Domínguez	DF												
17	(Canada)	Marcel de Jong	MF	19		3		3				22		3	
18	(Uruguay)	José Aja	DF	17	1	4	1					17	1	4	1
19	(United States)	Erik Hurtado	FW	12	2			3	1			15	3		
20	(United States)	Brek Shea	MF	28	3	3		4	1	1		32	4	4	
22	(United States)	Aaron Maund	DF	10				1				11			
23	(Sierra Leone)	Kei Kamara	FW	28	14	5	1	3	3			31	17	5	1
28	(United States)	Jake Nerwinski	DF	26		2		4				30		2	
29	(Peru)	Yordy Reyna	MF	26	6	9	2	3	1			29	7	9	2
31	(Canada)	Russell Teibert	MF	23	1	3		4				27	1	3	
39	(Canada)	Sean Melvin	GK												
46	(Canada)	Brett Levis	DF	14				1				15			
50	(Canada)	Theo Bair	FW												
54	(Canada)	Simon Colyn	MF	1								1			
65	(Canada)	Michael Baldisimo	MF												
66	(Egypt)	Ali Ghazal	MF	22		2		4				26		2	
67	(Canada)	Alphonso Davies	MF	31	8	2		2				33	8	2	
77	(England)	Jordon Mutch	MF	18	2	1						18	2	1	
24	(Canada)	David Norman Jr. (Note: Loaned out for the remainder of the season.)	MF					1		1		1		1	
45	(New Zealand)	Myer Bevan	FW												
–	(United States)	Justin Fiddes (Note: No longer with team.)	DF												
–	(Australia)	Bernie Ibini-Isei	FW	8				1				9			
Own goals					1				0				1		
Totals					54	60	7 (1)		6	4	1		60	64	8 (1)

Source: (for players and positions) First Team Squad (for squad numbers) (for actual stats.)
