= Ali Ghazal =

Egyptian footballer (born 1992)

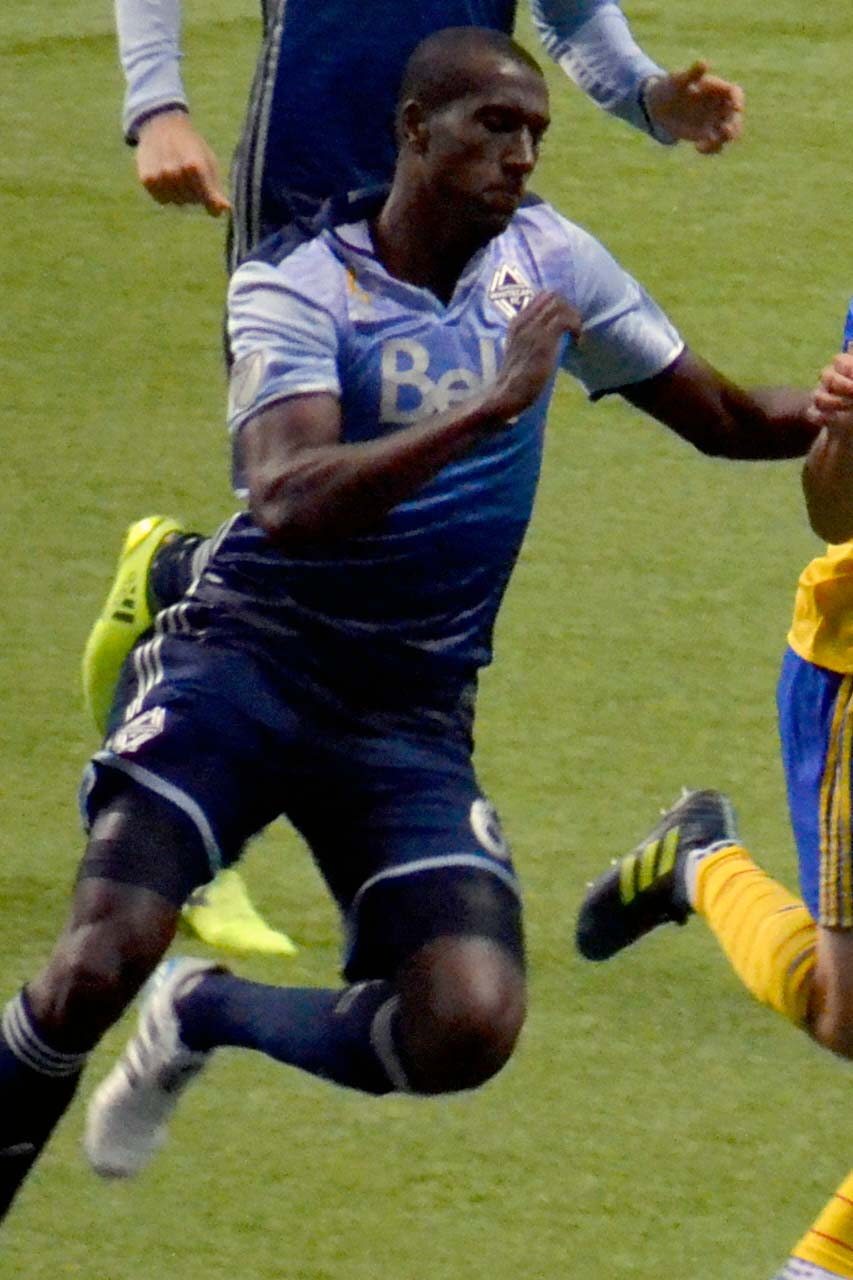
- Ghazal in 2017

Personal information
- Full name: Ali Ahmed Ali Mohamed Ghazal
- Date of birth: 1 February 1992 (age 34)
- Place of birth: Aswan, Egypt
- Height: 1.89 m (6 ft 2 in)
- Positions: Defensive midfielder; centre back

Youth career
- 2000–2006: El Sekka El Hadid
- 2006–2012: Wadi Degla

Senior career*
Years	Team	Apps	(Gls)
2013–2017	Nacional	107	(1)
2017	Guizhou Zhicheng	0	(0)
2017–2018	Vancouver Whitecaps FC	32	(0)
2019	Feirense	11	(0)
2020	AEL	10	(0)
2020–2021	Smouha	8	(0)
2022	Misr Lel Makkasa	2	(0)
2022–2023	Wadi Degla		

International career^{‡}
2011–2013	Egypt U20	3	(0)
2014–2019	Egypt	11	(0)
- * Club domestic league appearances and goals ‡ National team caps and goals as of 26 June 2019

Ali Ahmed Ali Mohamed Ghazal (Arabic: علي أحمد علي محمد غزال; born 1 February 1992) is an Egyptian former professional footballer who last played as a defensive midfielder or as a centre back for Wadi Degla. He made 11 appearances for the Egypt national team between 2014 and 2019.

He began his career as a youth player with El Sekka El Hadid before joining Wadi Degla in 2006. In 2013, despite having not played a senior game, he was sold to Portuguese club Nacional where he made his professional debut. After establishing himself in the first team, he was later named captain of the club, becoming the first Egyptian player to captain a top-tier European team. He joined Chinese side Guizhou Zhicheng in 2017 but changes to the league's foreign player quota resulted in him never playing a league match and his contract was cancelled by mutual consent. Following his release, he joined Vancouver in 2017, helping the side reach the MLS Cup Playoffs in his first season.

In May 2013, Ghazal was called up to the Egypt national team, making his international debut a year later.

== Club career ==
=== Youth ===
Born in Aswan, Ghazal grew up in Cairo playing football on the streets. His father and uncle were both former footballers. His nephews were invited to a trial with El Sekka El Hadid and asked Ghazal to go with them where he impressed the club's coaches and was offered a contract. His performances with El Hadid attracted attention from both Zamalek, where he trained with the squad for a month, and Al Ahly but transfers to both clubs collapsed over El Hadid's asking price. Mohamed Abbas who had worked as a coach with Zamalek during Ghazal's spell there was eventually appointed manager of Wadi Degla and persuaded him to join the side at the age of fourteen.

Degla were owned by Egyptian businessman Maged Sammy who also owned Belgian side Lierse and arranged a trial with the club when Ghazal turned eighteen. Ghazal later commented on his relationship ship with Sagny, stating "Samy is like a big brother to me, one of those who really believed in me from the very start, he made sure I trained well and even got me a personal English tutor to improve my language." He spent a month on trial with Lierse but was not offered a contract.

=== Nacional ===
Having been turned down by Lierse, Ghazal instead assembled a video of him playing for Degla's youth team and sent it to a scout he met online. The scout sent the video to coaches of Portuguese club Nacional, who submitted an offer to sign Ghazal and the transfer was completed in 2012 for a fee of €40,000.

After arriving at the club, Ghazal initially struggled to adapt to the pace of football in Portugal, later commenting: "I had no clue about anything. I took time in that first half season. I was not performing that well". He helped the side qualify for the UEFA Europa League and his performances attracted the attention of clubs from Italy and France, but their offers were rejected by the Nacional board.

At the start of the 2016–17 season, Ghazal scored his first senior professional goal during a 3–2 defeat to Belarusian side Dinamo Minsk in the Europa League. Ghazal later became the youngest person to captain the club at the age of 24 during a match against Marítimo and was later appointed as the club's permanent captain, becoming the first Egyptian player to captain a top-tier European side. In February 2016, he made his 100th appearance in all competitions for Nacional during a 1–1 draw with Vitória.

In 2017, he was sold to Chinese club Guizhou Zhicheng for a fee of €2.6 million following Nacional's relegation to LigaPro at the end of the 2016–17 season. But, as a result of new Chinese Football Association player regulations which limited the number of foreign players allowed to play in matches, Ghazal was unable to play for the club in the league, making one Chinese FA Cup appearance for the club, during a 5–3 defeat to Shanghai Shenxin, before the club mutually agreed to terminate his contract.

=== Vancouver Whitecaps FC ===
On 10 August 2017, Ghazal signed with Major League Soccer club Vancouver Whitecaps FC. Whitecaps manager Carl Robinson later revealed that the club had previously tried to sign Ghazal prior to his move to China and had been in contact with him for two months before he eventually signed. He made his debut a month later, starting in a 3–2 defeat against San Jose Earthquakes, earning praise from Robinson who described his performance as "absolutely top class." He made seven regular season appearances for the Whitecaps and played in all three of their MLS postseason playoff matches, reaching the semi-final before losing to Seattle Sounders FC. Ghazal was released by Vancouver at the end of their 2018 season.

== International career ==
After playing for the Egyptian under-20 side, Ghazal received his first call-up to the senior squad under manager Bob Bradley in 2013 but did not feature. He made his international debut under Bradley's successor Shawky Gharieb, being named in the starting line-up for a 2–0 victory over Bosnia and Herzegovina on 5 March 2014. He earned four further caps in 2014, including two in Egypt's unsuccessful qualifying campaign for the 2015 Africa Cup of Nations.

Ghazal later criticised Egypt manager Héctor Cúper over his continued omission from national team squads, commenting "I play well with Nacional so it's normal to join the national team as there are players (who have) failed to save regular places in their team, but they have been called for the camps." In 2018, he held talks with Cuper over returning to the national team for the 2018 FIFA World Cup but was not included.

== Career statistics ==
As of 23 June 2018

Appearances and goals by club, season and competition
Club	Season	League			Cup		Continental		Other		Total	
Club	Season	Division	Apps	Goals	Apps	Goals	Apps	Goals	Apps	Goals	Apps	Goals
Nacional	2012-13	Primeira Liga	11	0	0	0	0	0	0	0	11	0
Nacional	2013–14	Primeira Liga	26	0	2	0	0	0	0	0	28	0
Nacional	2014–15	Primeira Liga	29	1	2	0	2	1	1	0	34	2
Nacional	2015–16	Primeira Liga	27	0	2	0	4	0	0	0	35	0
Nacional	2016–17	Primeira Liga	14	0	1	0	0	0	0	0	15	0
Nacional	Total		107	1	7	0	6	1	1	0	123	2
Guizhou Zhicheng	2017	Chinese Super League	0	0	1	0	0	0	0	0	0	0
Vancouver Whitecaps FC	2017	Major League Soccer	7	0	0	0	0	0	3 (Note: Appearances in MLS Cup Playoffs)	0	10	0
Vancouver Whitecaps FC	2018	Major League Soccer	8	0	0	0	0	0	—		8	0
Vancouver Whitecaps FC	Total		15	0	0	0	0	0	3	0	18	0
Career total			122	1	8	0	6	1	1	0	142	2
