= 2021 CONCACAF Awards =

2021 North American association football award

CONCACAF Awards 2021
- Date: 4 April 2022
- Presented by: Lindsay Casinelli; Alejandro Berry
- Website: concacaf.com

The shortlists for the 2021 CONCACAF Awards were announced on 4 February 2022. The results were announced on 4 April 2022. The ceremony was streamed on YouTube.

== Men's football awards ==
=== Player of the Year ===
Rank	Player	Club
1	(Canada) Alphonso Davies	(Germany) Bayern Munich
	(Jamaica) Michail Antonio	(England) West Ham United
	(Canada) Jonathan David	(France) Lille
	(Mexico) Hirving Lozano	(Italy) Napoli
	(United States) Weston McKennie	(Italy) Juventus
	(United States) Christian Pulisic	(England) Chelsea

=== Best XI ===
Goalkeeper	Defenders	Midfielders	Forwards
(Guatemala) Kevin Moscoso	(United States) Sergiño Dest; (Mexico) Jorge Sánchez; (Mexico) Héctor Moreno; (Canada) Alphonso Davies	(Mexico) Edson Álvarez; (Mexico) Hector Herrera; (United States) Weston McKennie	(United States) Christian Pulisic; (Mexico) Hirving Lozano; (Mexico) Jesús Corona

==== Nominees ====
Player	Club	Position	Player	Club	Position	Player	Club	Position	Player	Club	Position
(Jamaica) Andre Blake	(United States) Philadelphia Union	GK	(Canada) Alphonso Davies	(Germany) Bayern Munich	DF	(Mexico) Edson Álvarez	(Netherlands) Ajax	MF	(Jamaica) Michail Antonio	(England) West Ham United	FW
(Mexico) Rodolfo Cota	(Mexico) León	GK	(United States) Sergiño Dest	(Spain) Barcelona	DF	(United States) Kellyn Acosta	(United States) Colorado Rapids	MF	(Panama) Cecilio Waterman	(Chile) Everton	FW
(Canada) Milan Borjan	(Serbia) Red Star Belgrade	GK	(Mexico) Jesús Gallardo	(Mexico) Monterrey	DF	(United States) Tyler Adams	(Germany) RB Leipzig	MF	(Canada) Tajon Buchanan	(Belgium) Club Brugge	FW
(United States) Sean Johnson	(United States) New York City FC	GK	(Jamaica) Damion Lowe	(Egypt) Al Ittihad	DF	(Panama) Adalberto Carrasquilla	(United States) Houston Dynamo FC	MF	(Canada) Jonathan David	(France) Lille	FW
(Honduras) Luis López	(Honduras) Real España	GK	(Mexico) Héctor Moreno	(Mexico) Monterrey	DF	(Mexico) Sebastián Córdova	(Mexico) América	MF	(Ecuador) Juan Anangonó	(Guatemala) Comunicaciones	FW
(Guatemala) Kevin Moscoso	(Guatemala) Comunicaciones	GK	(United States) Miles Robinson	(United States) Atlanta United FC	DF	(Spain) Carles Gil	(United States) New England Revolution	MF	(Mexico) Jesús Corona	(Portugal) Porto	FW
(Costa Rica) Keylor Navas	(France) Paris Saint-Germain	GK	(United States) James Sands	(United States) New York City FC	DF	(Canada) Stephen Eustáquio	(Portugal) Paços de Ferreira	MF	(Mexico) Hirving Lozano	(Italy) Napoli	FW
(Mexico) Guillermo Ochoa	(Mexico) América	GK	(United States) Sam Vines	(Belgium) Antwerp	DF	(Mexico) Héctor Herrera	(Spain) Atlético Madrid	MF	(Mexico) Rogelio Funes Mori	(Mexico) Monterrey	FW
(United States) Matt Turner	(United States) New England Revolution	GK	(Costa Rica) Francisco Calvo	(United States) Chicago Fire FC	DF	(United States) Weston McKennie	(Italy) Juventus	MF	(United States) Christian Pulisic	(England) Chelsea	FW
(Colombia) Camilo Vargas	(Mexico) Atlas	GK	(Mexico) Jorge Sánchez	(Mexico) América	DF	(Mexico) Carlos Rodríguez	(Mexico) Monterrey	MF	(Argentina) Valentín Castellanos	(United States) New York City FC	FW

== Women's football awards ==
=== Player of the Year ===
Rank	Player	Club
1	(United States) Crystal Dunn	(United States) Portland Thorns
	(Canada) Jessie Fleming	(England) Chelsea
	(United States) Lindsey Horan	(France) Lyon
	(Canada) Stephanie Labbé	(France) Paris Saint-Germain
	(Mexico) Stephany Mayor	(Mexico) UANL
	(Canada) Christine Sinclair	(United States) Portland Thorns

=== Best XI ===
Goalkeeper	Defenders	Midfielders	Forwards
Itzel González (MEX)	Ashley Lawrence (CAN); Rebeca Bernal (MEX); Janelly Farías (MEX); Allison Swaby (JAM)	Liliana Mercado (MEX); Cinthya Peraza (MEX); Rose Lavelle (USA)	Alicia Cerventes (MEX); Christine Sinclair (CAN); Stephany Mayor (MEX)

==== Nominees ====
Player	Club	Position	Player	Club	Position	Player	Club	Position	Player	Club	Position
(United States) Alyssa Naeher	(United States) Chicago Red Stars	GK	(United States) Alana Cook	(United States) OL Reign	DF	(Mexico) Cinthya Peraza	(Mexico) Santos Laguna	MF	(Mexico) Alicia Cervantes	(Mexico) Guadalajara	FW
(United States) Aubrey Bledsoe	(United States) Washington Spirit	GK	(Jamaica) Allyson Swaby	(Italy) Roma	DF	(Costa Rica) Gloriana Villalobos	(Costa Rica) Herediano	MF	(United States) Ashley Hatch	(United States) Washington Spirit	FW
(Jamaica) Rebecca Spencer	(England) Tottenham Hotspur	GK	(Canada) Ashley Lawrence	(France) Paris Saint-Germain	DF	(Wales) Jess Fishlock	(United States) OL Reign	MF	(Canada) Christine Sinclair	(United States) Portland Thorns	FW
(United States) Bella Bixby	(United States) Portland Thorns	GK	(United States) Becky Sauerbrunn	(United States) Portland Thorns	DF	(Canada) Jessie Fleming	(England) Chelsea	MF	(Canada) Deanne Rose	(England) Reading	FW
(United States) Casey Murphy	(United States) North Carolina Courage	GK	(United States) Caprice Dydasco	(United States) NJ/NY Gotham FC	DF	(Canada) Julia Grosso	(Italy) Juventus	MF	(Trinidad and Tobago) Kennya Cordner	(Norway) Sandviken	FW
(Mexico) Itzel González	(Mexico) Tijuana	GK	(United States) Crystal Dunn	(United States) Portland Thorns	DF	(Mexico) Liliana Mercado	(Mexico) UANL	MF	(Jamaica) Khadija Shaw	(England) Manchester City	FW
(Costa Rica) Daniela Solera	(Spain) Santa Teresa	GK	(Mexico) Janelly Farías	(Mexico) América	DF	(United States) Lindsey Horan	(United States) Portland Thorns	MF	(United States) Margaret Purce	(United States) NJ/NY Gotham FC	FW
(Canada) Kailen Sheridan	(United States) NJ/NY Gotham FC	GK	(Canada) Kadeisha Buchanan	(France) Lyon	DF	(Panama) Marta Cox	(Mexico) León	MF	(Costa Rica) Melissa Herrera	(France) Bordeaux	FW
(Canada) Stephanie Labbé	(France) Paris Saint-Germain	GK	(Mexico) Rebeca Bernal	(Mexico) Monterrey	DF	(Costa Rica) Raquel Rodríguez	(United States) Portland Thorns	MF	(Mexico) Stephany Mayor	(Mexico) UANL	FW
(Panama) Yenith Bailey	(Costa Rica) Dimas Escazú	GK	(Canada) Vanessa Gilles	(France) Bordeaux	DF	(United States) Rose Lavelle	(United States) OL Reign	MF	(United States) Trinity Rodman	(United States) Washington Spirit	FW
