= Alphonso Davies =

Canadian soccer player (born 2000)

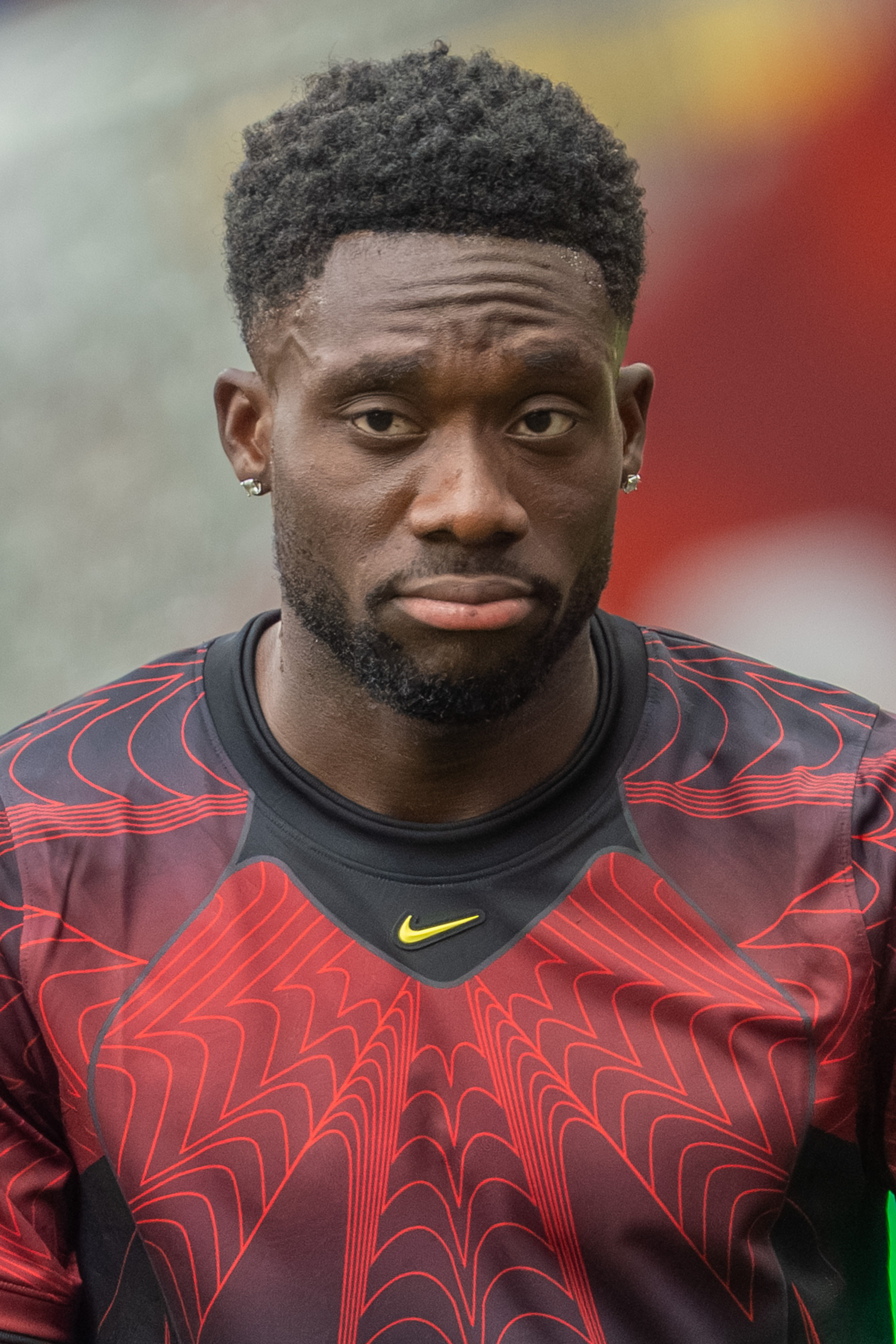
- Davies with Canada in 2026

Personal information
- Full name: Alphonso Boyle Davies
- Date of birth: November 2, 2000 (age 26)
- Place of birth: Buduburam, Ghana
- Height: 1.85 m (6 ft 1 in)
- Positions: Left-back; left midfielder

Team information
- Current team: Bayern Munich
- Number: 19

Youth career
- Edmonton Internationals
- Edmonton Strikers
- 2015–2016: Vancouver Whitecaps FC

Senior career*
Years	Team	Apps	(Gls)
2015–2016	Whitecaps FC 2	11	(2)
2016–2018	Vancouver Whitecaps FC	65	(8)
2018–2019	Bayern Munich II	6	(0)
2019–	Bayern Munich	175	(10)

International career^{‡}
2016	Canada U17	12	(2)
2016	Canada U20	1	(0)
2017–	Canada	60	(15)
Medal record
Men's soccer
Representing Canada
CONCACAF Nations League
Runner-up	2023 United States
Third place	2025 United States
- * Club domestic league appearances and goals as of 16:28, November 7, 2026 (UTC) ‡ National team caps and goals as of November 13, 2026

Alphonso Boyle Davies (born November 2, 2000) is a professional soccer player who plays as a left-back or left midfielder for Bundesliga club Bayern Munich and captains the Canada national team. Regarded as one of the best left-backs in the world, Davies has earned the nickname "the Roadrunner" for his pace, dribbling ability, and creativity.

Davies was the first player born in the 2000s to play in a Major League Soccer match. In July 2018, at the age of 17, Davies signed with Bayern Munich from MLS side Vancouver Whitecaps FC for a then-record MLS transfer fee. He remained with Vancouver for the rest of the 2018 season before joining Bayern for training in November, with his transfer officially taking effect in January 2019. In February 2025, he signed a new contract with Bayern Munich until June 2030. Davies was named the Bundesliga Rookie of the Season for 2019–20. In that season he also was part of the team winning the continental treble after Bayern won the Bundesliga, the UEFA Champions League and the DFB-Pokal. His performances led him to be a finalist for the 2020 Golden Boy award.

Born a Liberian refugee in Ghana, Davies and his family relocated to Canada when he was five years old. Davies obtained Canadian citizenship in June 2017; he was until then a Liberian national. Later that month, he became the youngest player to appear for the Canada national team. By scoring two goals in a 2017 CONCACAF Gold Cup match against French Guiana, he became the youngest player to score for the team, the youngest to score at the CONCACAF Gold Cup, and first player born in the 2000s to score at a top-level international tournament. He was named CONCACAF Men's Player of the Year in 2021 and 2022. Davies was called up to play in the 2022 FIFA World Cup, where he scored Canada's first-ever goal at a men's World Cup. He is widely considered both the best player on and the face of the Canada national team, as well as the best player in CONCACAF.

Davies is the first footballer and first Canadian, to become an ambassador for the United Nations refugee agency, UNHCR.

== Early life ==
Davies was born to Liberian parents in Buduburam, a refugee camp in Ghana, the fourth youngest of six siblings. His father, Debeah Davies, and his mother, Victoria Davies, originally lived in Monrovia, the capital of Liberia. They fled during the Second Liberian Civil War, which displaced more than 450,000 Liberians. In 2005, the family emigrated to Canada, eventually settling in Edmonton. After moving to Edmonton, Davies attended Mother Teresa Elementary School. At the age of 14, Davies relocated alone to Vancouver to join the Whitecaps FC Residency program. As part of the program, he attended Burnaby Central Secondary School. On June 6, 2017, he received Canadian citizenship; until then he had been a Liberian national.

Davies attended St Nicholas Catholic Junior High in the Edmonton Catholic School District. His school soccer teammate Onesphore Hamis recalled, "Soccer was the thing he wanted to get into, but language was a problem." His classmate and fellow Liberian immigrant Chernoh Fahnbulleh recalled of Davies, "He spoke English but it was, like, broken English".

As a child in Edmonton, Davies first played organized soccer with Free Footie, an after-school soccer league for inner-city elementary school students who cannot afford registration fees and equipment, or who lack transportation to games.

After playing for Edmonton Internationals, and Edmonton Strikers, Davies joined the Whitecaps FC Residency in 2015 at the age of 14.

== Club career ==
=== Whitecaps FC 2 ===
After joining Vancouver Whitecaps FC during their 2016 MLS preseason tour, Davies signed with Whitecaps FC 2 in the USL on February 23, 2016. At the time of his signing, he became the youngest player signed to a USL contract at 15 years, 3 months. Davies made his professional debut for Whitecaps FC 2 at the age of 15 years, 5 months in April 2016. On May 15, 2016, he scored his first professional goal, making him the youngest goal scorer in USL history at 15 years, 6 months, a record held by Davies until 2020. He scored two goals in 11 games played during the 2016 season.

=== Vancouver Whitecaps FC ===
Davies was named to the Whitecaps roster for the 2016 Canadian Championship on a short-term contract. On June 1, 2016, he made his first-team debut in the first leg of the Canadian Championship against Ottawa Fury FC and started the second leg in Vancouver.

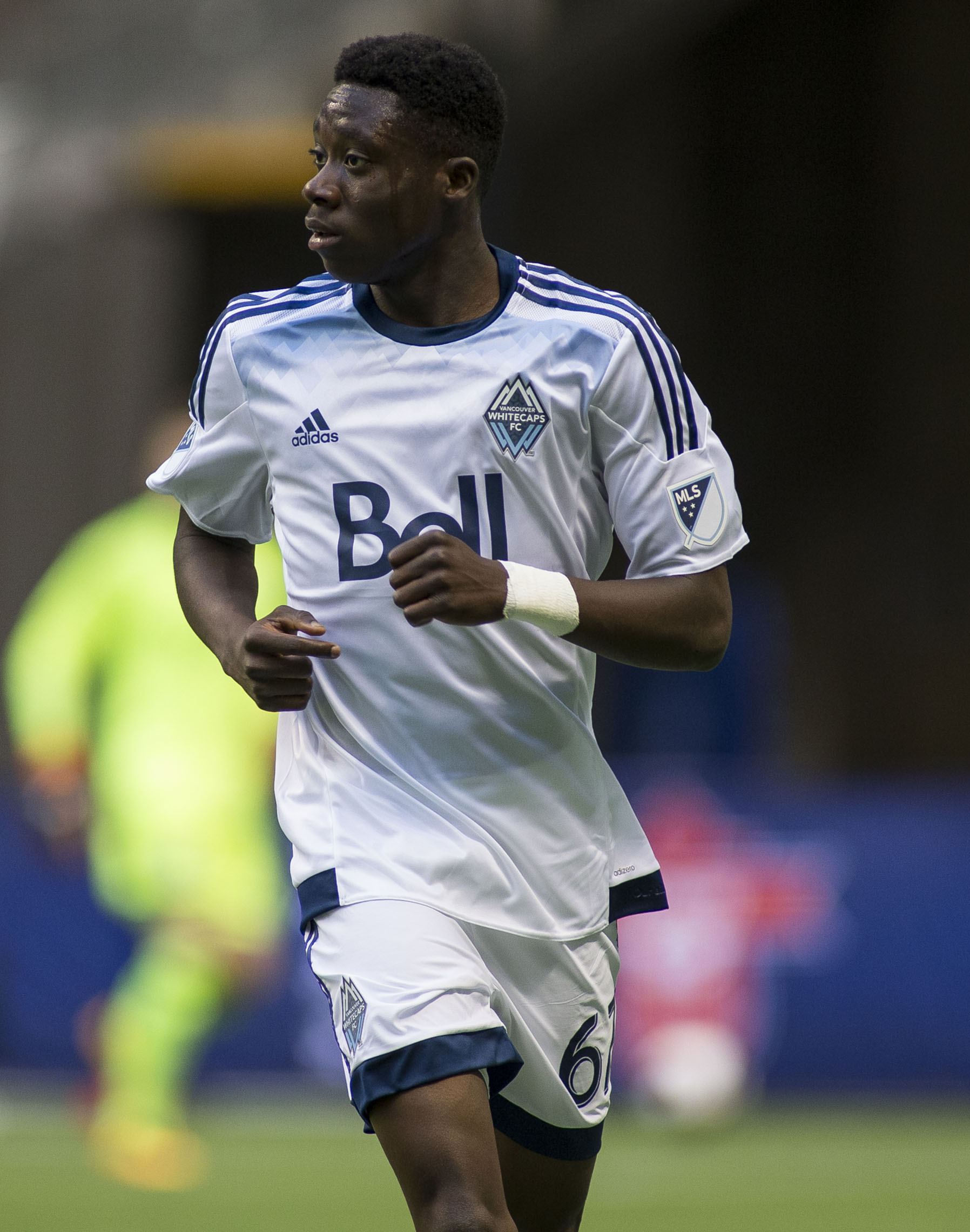
Davies playing in the Canadian Championship in 2016

On July 15, 2016, Davies signed a first team contract with the Whitecaps through 2018, with options for the 2019 and 2020 seasons. At the time of his signing, he was the youngest active player in Major League Soccer, and the third youngest player to have signed an MLS contract. Davies made his MLS debut on July 16, 2016, becoming the second youngest player to play in MLS, behind Freddy Adu. In September 2016, he scored his first goal for the first team in the 2016–17 CONCACAF Champions League against Sporting Kansas City in injury time to send the club through to the knockout round. In September 2016, Davies became the second youngest starter in MLS history when he started a game against the Colorado Rapids. On October 2, 2016, he started against rival club Seattle Sounders FC earning a penalty kick. During the 2016 season, Davies played in eight MLS games, four Canadian Championship games, and three games in the CONCACAF Champions League. In the 2017 season, he played in both legs against New York Red Bulls and Tigres UANL in the CONCACAF Champions League quarter-finals and semi-finals respectively, in which he scored in a 2–0 win over New York Red Bulls.

Following his impressive early MLS appearances, Davies attracted interest and was scouted by European clubs including Manchester United, Chelsea, and Liverpool, and was also named one of the 60 best young soccer talents in the world in 2017. In the 2018 season opener against the Montreal Impact, Davies scored his first goal in MLS action, and assisted on a Kei Kamara goal. On June 10, 2018, he scored a goal and got three assists in a 5–2 win over Orlando City SC. Davies scored two goals and provided two assists to help his side defeat Minnesota United with a 4–2 victory on July 29. On June 29, 2018, Davies was included in the MLS All-Star roster for the 2018 MLS All-Star Game on August 1 against Juventus. Davies made an appearance during the match, which finished as a 3–5 penalty shoot-out loss following a 1–1 draw. Davies was named the Vancouver Whitecaps FC Player of the Year on October 24, and also received the Whitecaps' Goal of the Year award. In Davies' final game for Vancouver on October 28, he scored both goals in a 2–1 victory over the Portland Timbers.

=== Bayern Munich ===
==== 2018–19: Vancouver to Munich ====
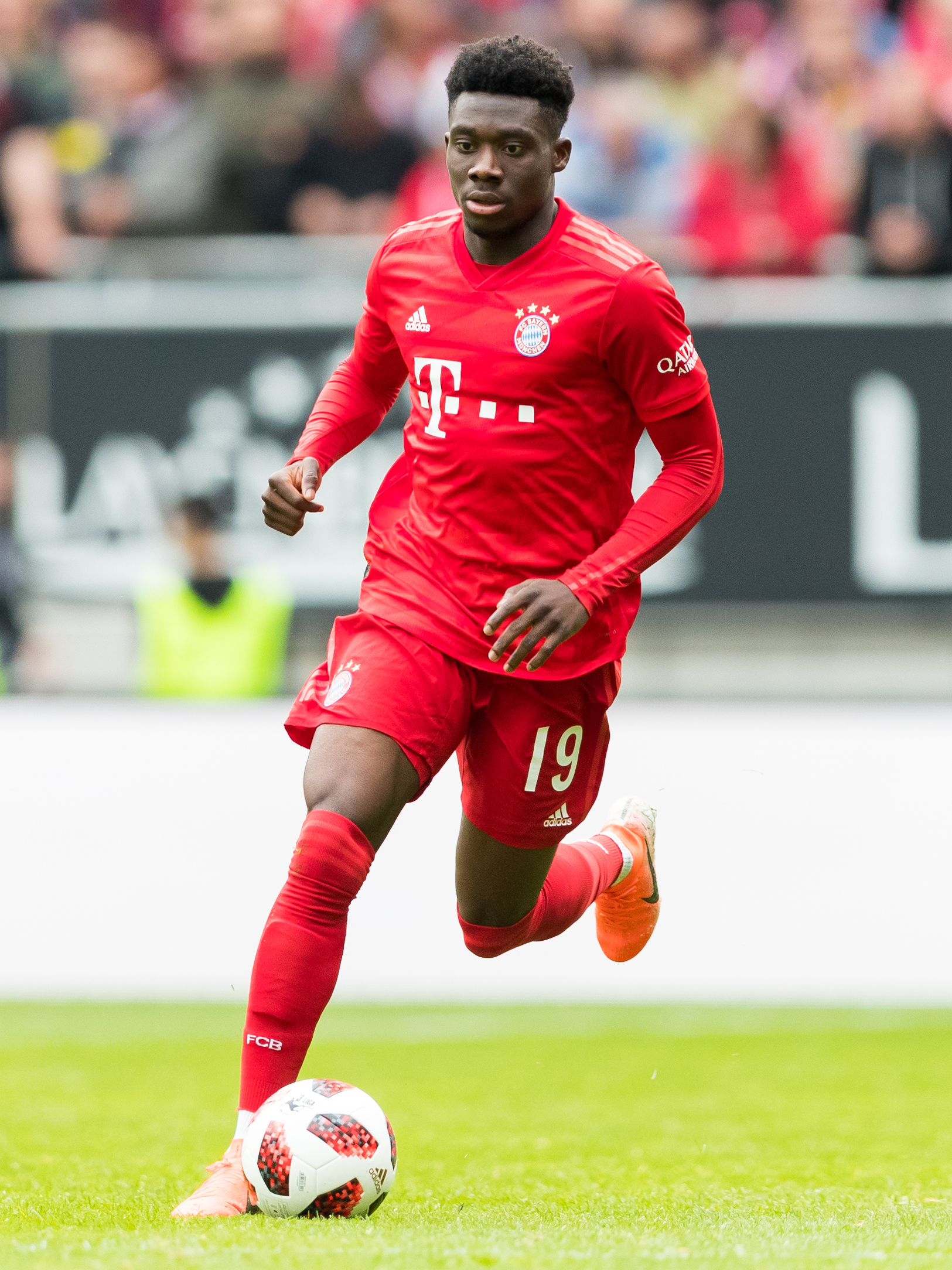
Davies playing for Bayern Munich in 2019

On July 25, 2018, Vancouver announced that it had agreed to a multi-million-dollar transfer of Davies to Bundesliga club Bayern Munich, with Davies seeing out the 2018 MLS season with Vancouver, before joining Bayern in January 2019. The base fee for the transfer was US$13.5 million, with performance-related bonuses that total $22 million, a then-record for MLS, later eclipsed by the transfer of Miguel Almirón to Newcastle United. Davies had his first training session with Bayern on November 21, 2018, and debuted on January 12, 2019, against Borussia Mönchengladbach in the Telekom Cup championship finale, which Bayern won on penalties following a scoreless draw. Davies made his Bundesliga debut on January 27 against VfB Stuttgart, appearing as a late substitute for Kingsley Coman in a 3–1 victory. He scored his first goal for Bayern on March 17, netting the final goal in a 6–0 rout of Mainz 05. In doing so, and at the age of 18 years, 4 months and 15 days, he became the youngest player since Roque Santa Cruz, twenty years prior, to score for the club. He is the first Canada international to score for Bayern. On May 18, 2019, Davies won his first Bundesliga title as Bayern finished two points above Dortmund with 78 points. A week later, Davies won his first DFB-Pokal as Bayern defeated RB Leipzig 3–0 in the 2019 DFB-Pokal Final. Davies was not selected for the match day squad.

==== 2019–20: First team breakthrough and Champions League triumph ====
Davies made his first Bundesliga start with Bayern on matchday nine of the 2019–20 Bundesliga season, going the full 90 minutes in a 2–1 home victory over Union Berlin. He made his first UEFA Champions League start on November 6, 2019, in a 2–0 victory against Olympiacos. Throughout the 2019–20 season, coach Niko Kovač moved Davies to the left back position, following long-term injuries to Niklas Süle and Lucas Hernandez, to allow David Alaba to play at centre back. Davies earned high praise during his time in that role, gaining an early reputation as one of the best left backs in the world. On February 25, 2020, Davies set-up Robert Lewandowski's goal in a 3–0 away win over Chelsea in the first leg of the round of 16 of the Champions League; his performance during the match was widely praised in the media, with pundit Gary Lineker commenting that Davies played "beautifully," while former U.S. international Stuart Holden described him as a "world class left back."

In April 2020, Bayern Munich and Davies agreed to a contract extension to 2025, adding two years onto his existing contract.

Following the restart of the Bundesliga which had halted all matches due to the COVID-19 pandemic, Davies started against both Eintracht Frankfurt and Borussia Dortmund. He scored and assisted in the Frankfurt match and ended up running down Dortmund's Erling Haaland at a speed of 35.3 km/h (21.9 mph). On June 16, 2020, Davies featured for Bayern against Werder Bremen in a game they won 1–0, securing Bayern Munich their eighth consecutive league title. Davies was sent off in the 79th minute for a second yellow card, but not before breaking the record for the fastest speed clocked in the Bundesliga at 36.51 km/h (22.69 mph). Davies was named the Bundesliga Rookie of the Year for the 2019–20 season.

On August 14, 2020, Davies, who was playing the left-back position, was applauded for assisting Joshua Kimmich's goal against Barcelona in the Champions League quarter-finals which Bayern Munich won 8–2. On August 23, he started in the Champions League final against Paris Saint-Germain, which Bayern won 1–0 to complete a continental treble; consequently, Davies became the first Canadian international to win the Champions League.

==== 2020–present: Domestic success and contract extension ====
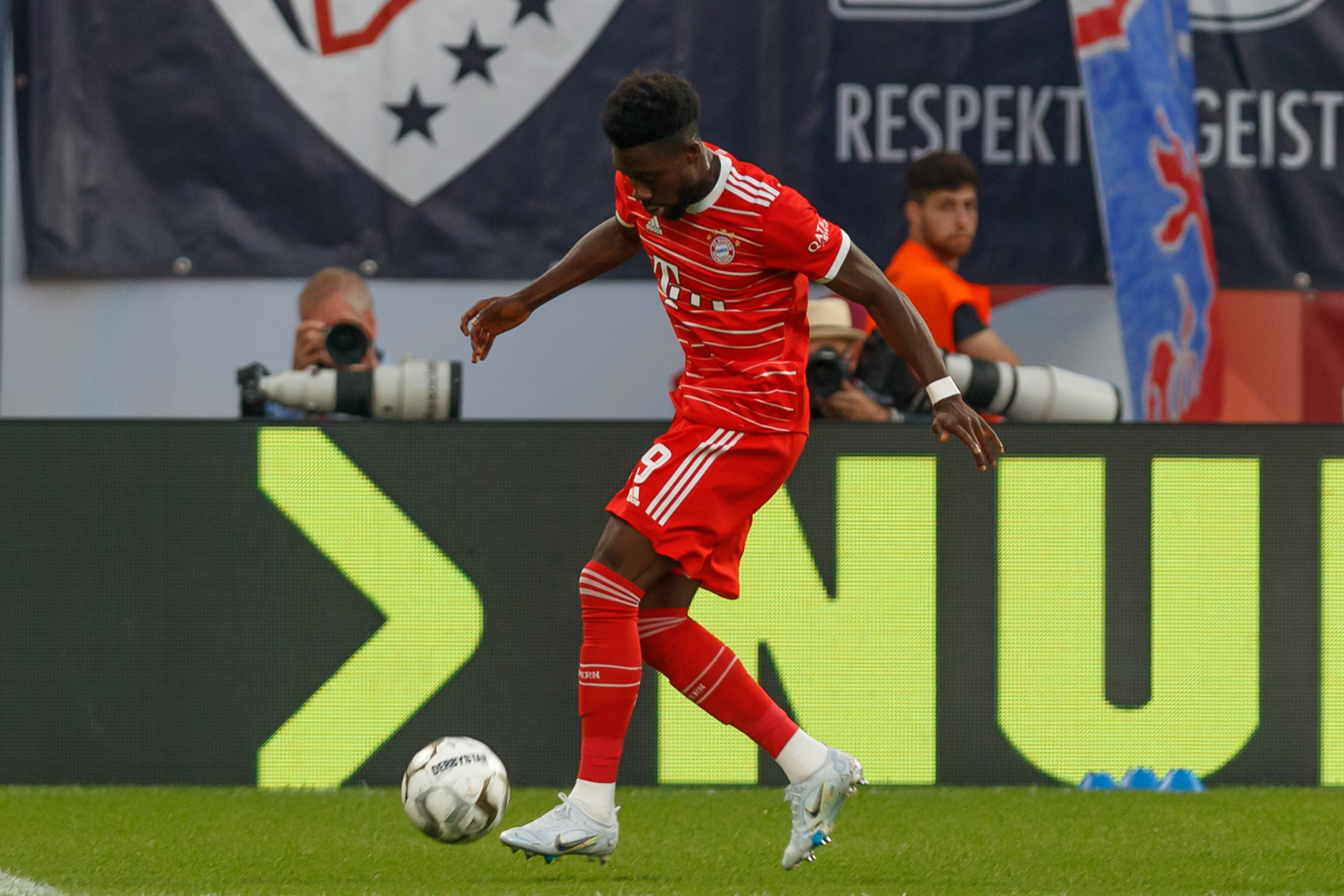
Davies in action with Bayern Munich in 2022

On October 24, Davies was forced off in the third minute of play in an eventual 5–0 home win over Eintracht Frankfurt in the Bundesliga, after sustaining an injury to his right ankle; it was later announced that he was expected to remain sidelined for 6 to 8 weeks.

Davies finished in third place for the 2020 Golden Boy award, behind Erling Haaland and Ansu Fati. On February 11, 2021, he played in a 1–0 win over Tigres UANL in the 2020 FIFA Club World Cup Final.

On October 8, Davies sustained a cranial bruise while taking a foot to the face in the 45th minute in a challenge with Dortmund's Jude Bellingham of a 2–2 away draw.

On March 4, 2023, Davies made his 100th Bundesliga appearance in Bayern's 2–1 victory over VfB Stuttgart, which made him the youngest non-German to reach that feat for Bayern Munich. On May 8, 2024, he scored his first Champions League goal in the semi-final second leg, which granted his team a 1–0 away lead against Real Madrid, before conceding two late goals and losing 4–3 on aggregate. On February 4, 2025, he extended his contract with the club until 2030. Davies scored a 94th-minute equalizer against Celtic in the Champions League playoff round on February 18, 2025, enabling Bayern to progress 3–2 on aggregate. A month later, he sustained an ACL injury in his right knee during international break, which would sideline him for the rest of the 2024–25 season. Later that year, on December 9, he returned from his long injury layoff, coming on in a 3–1 Champions League win over Sporting CP.

On April 19, 2026, Davies scored Bayern's third goal in a 4–2 win over VfB Stuttgart, a result that secured the club the 2025–26 Bundesliga title, his seventh league title with Bayern.

== International career ==
=== Youth ===
Although a Liberian citizen by birth, Davies was called to numerous Canada under-15 and under-18 camps in 2014 and 2015. On March 17, 2016, he was called up to the Canada under-20 squad for a friendly against England under-20. In November 2016, Davies attended a Canada under-17 camp, where he scored against Jamaica. In 2016, he was named the Canada U17 Male Player of the Year for his performances with the under-17 and under-20 squads in friendlies. In March 2017, Davies stated in an interview that, "to be able to represent Canada, it is one of my dreams." In 2017, he was named the Canada under-17 Male Player of the Year for a second time due to his performances with the senior team.

=== Senior ===
==== Debut and 2017 Gold Cup ====
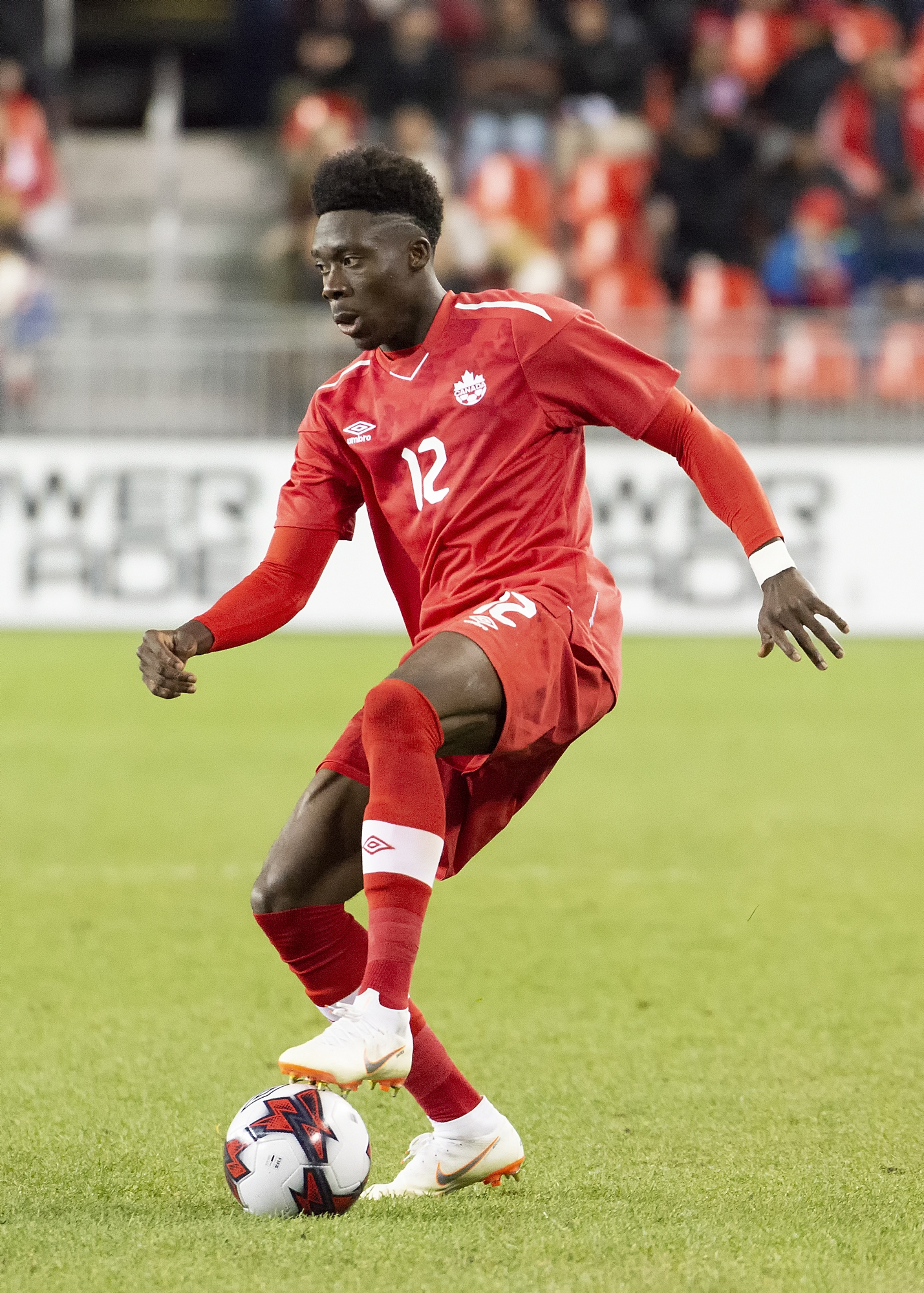
Davies playing for Canada in 2018

Born a Liberian refugee, Davies was originally only eligible for the Liberian national team. On June 6, 2017, Davies passed his Canadian citizenship test and officially became a citizen of Canada, making him eligible to play for the Canada national team. On the same day, Davies was added to a senior team camp for a friendly against Curaçao, as well as Canada's preliminary 40-man roster for the 2017 Gold Cup. Davies debuted for the senior team on June 13, 2017, during a friendly game against Curaçao at the age of 16, making him the youngest player to play for the national team. On June 27, Davies was named to the final 23-man squad for the 2017 Gold Cup. In Canada's first match of that tournament, on July 7, 2017, Davies scored twice in a 4–2 victory over French Guiana. The goals made him the youngest goalscorer in both Gold Cup and Canada history. He then scored in their second match against Costa Rica to earn a 1–1 draw. Davies went on to win the Golden Boot as the tournament's top scorer, the Young Player of the Tournament award, and was included in the tournament's Best XI selection.

==== 2019 Gold Cup and 2019–20 Nations League ====
On May 30, 2019, Davies was named to the squad for the 2019 CONCACAF Gold Cup. Davies was called up for a pair of 2019–20 CONCACAF Nations League A matches against Cuba on September 7 and 10, 2019. In the second match, Davies scored the decisive goal in a 1–0 victory for Canada. In October 2019, Davies helped lead Canada to their first win over the United States in 34 years, scoring the opening goal of their CONCACAF Nations League match, which ended 2–0, and becoming at 18 years and 10 months Canada's youngest goalscorer in CONCACAF Nations League.

==== 2022 World Cup cycle ====
In July 2021, Davies was named to the Canada squad for the 2021 CONCACAF Gold Cup, however he suffered an ankle injury on July 9, two days before Canada's opening match at the tournament, that ruled him out of the competition; Canada went on to reach the semi-finals of the tournament, where they were defeated 2–1 by Mexico. On October 13, 2021, in a World Cup qualifying match against Panama, Davies scored a highlight reel goal, making an 80-yard run to keep the ball in play, reaching a top speed of 37.1 km/h (23.1 mph). In his hometown of Edmonton, Alberta, Davies played a key role in Canada's 2–1 World Cup qualifying win over Mexico in November 2021.

Davies played a central role in Canada's qualification campaign for most of the calendar, but he missed the final two international windows as a result of having developed mild myocarditis. His livestream Twitch commentaries on the remaining games attracted media attention, in particular his reaction to the 4–0 victory over Jamaica that officially qualified Canada for the 2022 World Cup. This was only the second time Canada had managed this feat, and the first time since 1986.

In May 2022, Davies was called up to the Canada squad for two CONCACAF Nations League matches and a friendly. In the June 9 game against Curaçao, he marked his return to international competition after his myocarditis-related absence with two goals in a 4–0 victory for Canada.

In November 2022, Davies was named to Canada's squad for the 2022 FIFA World Cup. In Canada's first match of the tournament against Belgium on November 23, he failed to score an early penalty in an eventual 1–0 loss, with Thibaut Courtois saving his shot. Four days later, he scored Canada's first ever goal at the FIFA World Cup in the match against Croatia; however, Croatia came back to win 4–1, eliminating Canada from the tournament after two matches. As Canada's second goal in the competition was an own goal by Moroccan Nayef Aguerd, he was Canada's only goalscorer in the tournament.

==== 2023 Nations League Finals, 2024 Copa América, and Captaincy ====
In June 2023, Davies was named to the final 23-man squad for Canada ahead of the 2023 CONCACAF Nations League Finals. Having missed the final months of the club season due to a hamstring injury, Davies did not start in the semi-final against Panama, but came off the bench as a substitute in the second half and scored the team's second goal in a 2–0 victory. Canada advanced to the tournament final against the United States, their first tournament final in 23 years, but lost 2–0 to the Americans.

Davies captained Canada for the first time in a friendly against the Netherlands on June 6, 2024. On June 15, Davies was named to Canada's squad for the 2024 Copa América. He was later named the team's captain for the tournament by head coach Jesse Marsch, succeeding longtime veterans Atiba Hutchinson and Milan Borjan. Davies would captain his country all the way to the semifinals of the tournament, with Canada finishing fourth following a 4–3 penalty shoot-out loss to Uruguay in the third-place playoff after a 2–2 draw.

In a September 2024 friendly in Kansas City, Kansas, Davies captained Les Rouges to a 2–1 win against the United States, their first on American soil since 1957.

==== Lead-up to 2026 World Cup and injury struggles ====
While named to the initial roster for Canada's November 2024 tie against Suriname in the 2024–25 CONCACAF Nations League quarterfinals, Davies would withdraw before the international window for what head coach Jesse Marsch described as "match fatigue". Canada would win the tie 4–0 on aggregate to progress to the 2025 Nations League finals.

On May 28, 2026, Davies was selected and named captain for Canada's squad for the 2026 FIFA World Cup, which the country co-hosted along with Mexico and United States. He was ruled out of his team's opening match of the tournament against Bosnia and Herzegovina in Toronto, due to injury; Canada earned their first World Cup point ever following a 1–1 draw. He remained on the bench in Canada's remaining group matches – a 6–0 win over Qatar, the team's first ever World Cup victory, and a 2–1 defeat to Switzerland – as Canada advanced to the knock-out stages of the World Cup for the first time in its history, finishing as runners-up of Group B with four points; although head coach Jesse Marsch had initially slated Davies to play in the team's final group match, he later admitted that he was using Davies as a "decoy," adding that he was not yet ready to play, but that would be available for the knock-out stages. Davies made his first appearance of the tournament as a substitute in a 1–0 victory over South Africa in the round of 32, and was praised in the Canadian sports media for his immediate impact in Canada's injury time win. However, he was once again left on the bench due to injury in Canada's 3–0 defeat to Morocco in the round of 16. Davies's fitness struggles and lack of playing time throughout the tournament, as well as the negative impact of his absence on Canada's performance in the round of 16, led Marsch's decision to include him in the World Cup squad to be questioned in the media.

== Player profile ==
=== Style of play ===
Although mainly playing as an attacking full back on the left flank, Davies is capable of playing as a wing-back, left midfielder, or winger due to his explosive pace, dribbling, creativity, and crossing ability, which allow him to make overlapping runs and serve as an attacking threat for his teams. Although his positional sense has been cited as an area in which he needs to improve, his pace and intelligence allows him to drop back to provide defensive cover for his team, and assist at both ends of the pitch.

=== Reception ===
Davies has been widely regarded as one of the best left-backs in the world, with particular praise for his ability to be able to also play as an offensive winger if needed. In his early seasons with Bayern he was praised as one of the world's best youth players, being listed on the 2020 IFFHS World Youth Team and finished 3rd in voting – the highest for a defender – for the 2020 Golden Boy award, which is presented to the best under-21 player in Europe. Regarded by many as the greatest Canadian player of all time since a young age, he is seen as the "face" of his national side and scored the country's first ever World Cup goal in 2022. Since 2020, Davies has been widely considered as one the active best players in CONCACAF.

== Personal life ==
Davies was in a relationship with fellow Canadian Jordyn Huitema, a forward for Paris Saint-Germain and the Canada women's national team starting from September 2017. In September 2019, he was fined €20,000 for arriving late to a Bayern practice after visiting Huitema in Paris, and by June 2020, French press were aware that Davies might be interested in having Huitema sign with Bayern's women's side. On May 22, 2022, Davies confirmed on social media that he and Huitema had split up. In July 2026, he married his girlfriend, Sheyenne Jen, in a ceremony held at the Château de Saint-Martin-du-Tertre.

Davies is an ambassador for the United Nations High Commissioner for Refugees. In April 2020, he played a virtual soccer match against fellow professional Asmir Begović – who also came to Canada as a child refugee – to raise money for the agency.

Davies is a fan of the NHL's Edmonton Oilers. Davies serves as a club ambassador with Edmonton BTB SC, with whom he played for a period in his youth.

== Career statistics ==
=== Club ===
As of match played November 7, 2026

Appearances and goals by club, season and competition
Club	Season	League			National cup (Note: Includes Canadian Championship, DFB-Pokal)		Continental		Other		Total	
Club	Season	Division	Apps	Goals	Apps	Goals	Apps	Goals	Apps	Goals	Apps	Goals
Whitecaps FC 2	2016	USL	11	2	—		—		0	0	11	2
Vancouver Whitecaps FC	2016	MLS	8	0	4	0	3 (Note: Appearances in CONCACAF Champions League)	1	—		15	1
Vancouver Whitecaps FC	2017	MLS	26	0	2	2	4	1	1 (Note: Appearance in MLS Cup playoffs)	0	33	3
Vancouver Whitecaps FC	2018	MLS	31	8	2	0	—		—		33	8
Vancouver Whitecaps FC	Total		65	8	8	2	7	2	1	0	81	12
Bayern Munich II	2018–19	Regionalliga Bayern	3	0	—		—		2 (Note: Appearances in 3. Liga promotion play-offs)	0	5	0
Bayern Munich II	2019–20	3. Liga	3	0	—		—		—		3	0
Bayern Munich II	Total		6	0	—		—		2	0	8	0
Bayern Munich	2018–19	Bundesliga	6	1	0	0	0	0	0	0	6	1
Bayern Munich	2019–20	Bundesliga	29	3	5	0	8 (Note: Appearances in UEFA Champions League)	0	1 (Note: Appearance in DFL-/Franz Beckenbauer Supercup)	0	43	3
Bayern Munich	2020–21	Bundesliga	23	1	2	0	6	0	4 (Note: One appearance in UEFA Super Cup, one appearance in DFL-Supercup, two appearances in FIFA Club World Cup)	0	35	1
Bayern Munich	2021–22	Bundesliga	22	0	1	0	7	0	1	0	31	0
Bayern Munich	2022–23	Bundesliga	25	1	2	2	9	0	1	0	38	3
Bayern Munich	2023–24	Bundesliga	29	2	2	0	10	1	1	0	42	3
Bayern Munich	2024–25	Bundesliga	19	1	3	0	9	2	0	0	31	3
Bayern Munich	2025–26	Bundesliga	13	1	2	0	8	0	0	0	23	1
Bayern Munich	2026–27	Bundesliga	8	0	2	1	4	2	1	0	15	3
Bayern Munich	Total		175	10	19	3	61	5	9	0	264	18
Career total			257	20	27	5	68	7	12	0	364	32

=== International ===
As of match played November 13, 2026

Appearances and goals by national team and year
National team	Year	Apps	Goals
Canada	2017	6	3
Canada	2018	3	0
Canada	2019	8	2
Canada	2020	0	0
Canada	2021	13	5
Canada	2022	7	3
Canada	2023	7	2
Canada	2024	12	0
Canada	2025	2	0
Canada	2026	2	0
Total		60	15

As of November 13, 2026. Scores and results list Canada's goal tally first, score column indicates score after each Davies goal.

List of international goals scored by Alphonso Davies
No.	Date	Venue	Opponent	Score	Result	Competition
1	July 7, 2017	Red Bull Arena, Harrison, United States	French Guiana	3–0	4–2	2017 CONCACAF Gold Cup
2	July 7, 2017	Red Bull Arena, Harrison, United States	French Guiana	4–2	4–2	2017 CONCACAF Gold Cup
3	July 11, 2017	BBVA Compass Stadium, Houston, United States	Costa Rica	1–0	1–1	2017 CONCACAF Gold Cup
4	September 10, 2019	Truman Bodden Sports Complex, George Town, Cayman Islands	Cuba	1–0	1–0	2019–20 CONCACAF Nations League A
5	October 15, 2019	BMO Field, Toronto, Canada	United States	1–0	2–0	2019–20 CONCACAF Nations League A
6	March 29, 2021	IMG Academy, Bradenton, United States	Cayman Islands	4–0	11–0	2022 FIFA World Cup qualification
7	March 29, 2021	IMG Academy, Bradenton, United States	Cayman Islands	9–0	11–0	2022 FIFA World Cup qualification
8	June 5, 2021	IMG Academy, Bradenton, United States	Aruba	5–0	7–0	2022 FIFA World Cup qualification
9	June 8, 2021	SeatGeek Stadium, Bridgeview, United States	Suriname	1–0	4–0	2022 FIFA World Cup qualification
10	October 13, 2021	BMO Field, Toronto, Canada	Panama	2–1	4–1	2022 FIFA World Cup qualification
11	June 9, 2022	BC Place, Vancouver, Canada	Curaçao	1–0	4–0	2022–23 CONCACAF Nations League A
12	June 9, 2022	BC Place, Vancouver, Canada	Curaçao	3–0	4–0	2022–23 CONCACAF Nations League A
13	November 27, 2022	Khalifa International Stadium, Al Rayyan, Qatar	Croatia	1–0	1–4	2022 FIFA World Cup
14	June 15, 2023	Allegiant Stadium, Paradise, United States	Panama	2–0	2–0	2023 CONCACAF Nations League Finals
15	November 21, 2023	BMO Field, Toronto, Canada	Jamaica	1–0	2–3	2023–24 CONCACAF Nations League A

== Honours ==
Bayern Munich

- Bundesliga: 2018–19, 2019–20, 2020–21, 2021–22, 2022–23, 2024–25, 2025–26
- DFB-Pokal: 2018–19, 2019–20, 2025–26
- DFL-/Franz Beckenbauer Supercup: 2020, 2021, 2022, 2026
- UEFA Champions League: 2019–20
- UEFA Super Cup: 2020
- FIFA Club World Cup: 2020

Individual

- CONCACAF Gold Cup Best XI: 2017
- CONCACAF Gold Cup Bright Future Award: 2017
- CONCACAF Gold Cup Golden Boot Award: 2017
- FIFPRO World 11: 2020
- IFFHS Men's World Team: 2020, 2021, 2022, 2023 2024
- IFFHS Men's World Youth (U20) Team: 2020
- UEFA Team of the Year: 2020
- CONCACAF Men's Player of the Year: 2021, 2022
- CONCACAF Best XI: 2021
- CONCACAF Nations League Finals Best XI: 2023
- Lou Marsh Trophy co-winner: 2020
- Lionel Conacher Award winner: 2020
- Canadian Men's Player of the Year: 2018, 2020, 2021, 2022
- Canada U-17 Male Player of the Year: 2016, 2017
- UEFA Champions League Defender of the Season runner-up: 2019–20
- UEFA Champions League Squad of the Season: 2019–20
- UEFA Champions League Breakthrough XI: 2020
- Bundesliga Team of the Season: 2020–21, 2021–22, 2022–23, 2024–25
- Bundesliga Rookie of the Season: 2019–20
- Bundesliga Player of the Month: November 2021
- Bundesliga Rookie of the Month: May 2020
- VDV Bundesliga Team of the Season: 2019–20, 2020–21, 2022–23
- VDV Bundesliga Newcomer of the Season: 2019–20
- kicker Bundesliga Team of the Season: 2019–20
- MLS All-Star: 2018
- Vancouver Whitecaps FC Player of the Year: 2018
- Vancouver Whitecaps FC Goal of the Year: 2018
