= Brett Levis =

Canadian soccer player (born 1993)

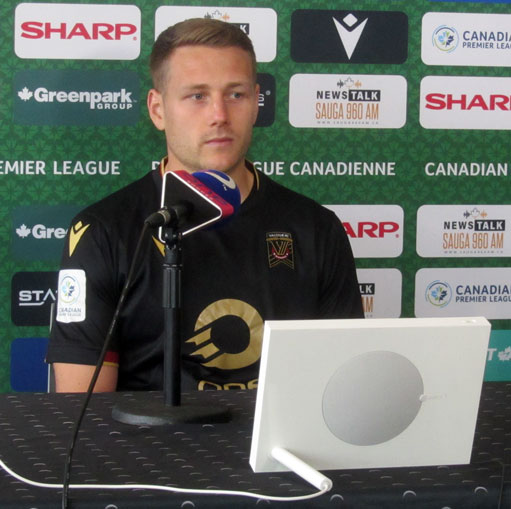
- Levis in 2021

Personal information
- Date of birth: March 29, 1993 (age 33)
- Place of birth: Regina, Saskatchewan, Canada
- Height: 1.75 m (5 ft 9 in)
- Positions: Left-back; winger

Team information
- Current team: Atlético Ottawa
- Number: 17

Youth career
- Saskatoon United

College career
Years	Team	Apps	(Gls)
2011–2014	Saskatchewan Huskies	50	(29)

Senior career*
Years	Team	Apps	(Gls)
2013	Victoria Highlanders	14	(9)
2014	Vancouver Whitecaps U23	12	(2)
2015–2017	Whitecaps FC 2	49	(8)
2016–2019	Vancouver Whitecaps FC	24	(0)
2020–2022	Valour FC	43	(3)
2023	FC Tulsa	8	(0)
2023–2024	Detroit City	32	(1)
2025	Atlético Ottawa	11	(0)
Total		164	(13)
- * Club domestic league appearances and goals as of October 28, 2025

Brett Levis (born March 29, 1993) is a Canadian former professional soccer player who played as a left-back.

== Club career ==
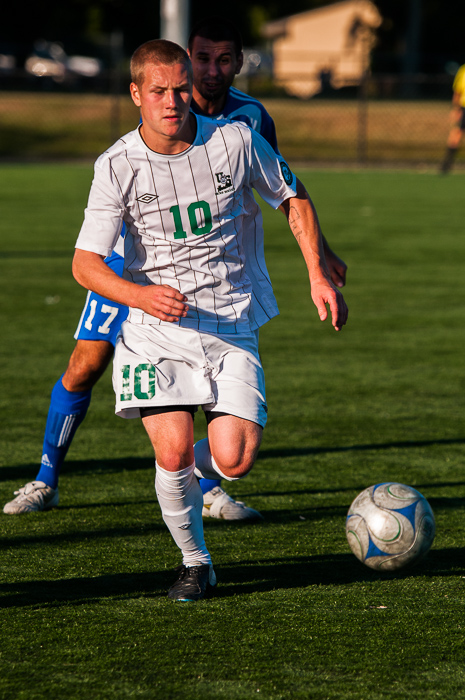
Levis with the University of Saskatchewan in 2012

=== Early career ===
Levis spent his entire college career at the University of Saskatchewan. He was part of the squad which won the first–ever Canada West championship in program history during the 2014-15 season. He made a total of 50 appearances for the Huskies and tallied 29 goals and 16 assists.

He also played in the Premier Development League for Victoria Highlanders and Vancouver Whitecaps FC U-23.

=== Whitecaps FC 2 ===
On February 24, 2015, Levis signed a professional contract with USL expansion side Whitecaps FC 2. He made his professional debut on March 29 in a 4–0 defeat to Seattle Sounders FC 2.

=== Vancouver Whitecaps FC ===
After signing a short-term MLS contract in July 2016, Levis had a notable pre-season including a fantastic performance against Crystal Palace providing an assist to Kendall Waston for a 2-2 draw. He made his first team debut against Central FC in the 2016–17 CONCACAF Champions League. In August 2016, Levis signed a first team deal with Vancouver Whitecaps FC through 2017, with options for the 2018 and 2019 seasons. In October 2016, Levis made his MLS debut against the Portland Timbers replacing Giles Barnes. In the same game, he would tear his ACL which would keep him out of play for the majority of the 2017 season.

Going in to the 2018 season, Levis was expected to play a bigger role on the club with the departure of Jordan Harvey in the offseason. Levis was released by Vancouver at the end of the 2019 season.

=== Valour FC ===
On January 30, 2020, Levis signed with Canadian Premier League side Valour FC. He made his debut on August 16 in a 2–0 loss to Cavalry FC.. In January 2022 Valour announced they had declined Levis' contract option. However, Valour re-signed Levis on February 25, 2022. In November 2022, he departed Valour.

=== FC Tulsa ===
Levis signed with USL Championship club FC Tulsa on November 15, 2022.

=== Detroit City ===
On June 6, 2023, Levis was traded along with teammate Darío Suárez to USL Championship side Detroit City. Levis left Detroit following their 2024 season.

=== Atlético Ottawa ===
On February 20, 2025, Levis signed a two-year contract with Canadian Premier League side Atlético Ottawa. He was part of the squad which won Ottawa's first CPL title in November 2025.

In January 2026, it was announced that Levis had retired from playing professionally.

In April 2026, Levis was part of the Saskatoon Unity FC squad which competed at the 2026 Men’s Futsal Canadian Championship, losing 6–2 in the semifinal against Atlético Gatineau.

== International career ==
Levis was named to Canada's 40-man provisional roster for the 2019 CONCACAF Gold Cup.

== Career statistics ==
As of October 28, 2025

Club	League	Season	League		Playoffs		Domestic Cup		CONCACAF		Total	
Club	League	Season	Apps	Goals	Apps	Goals	Apps	Goals	Apps	Goals	Apps	Goals
Whitecaps FC 2	USL	2015	20	4	0	0	0	0	0	0	20	4
Whitecaps FC 2	USL	2016	24	4	3	0	0	0	0	0	27	4
Whitecaps FC 2	USL	2017	5	0	0	0	0	0	0	0	5	0
Whitecaps FC 2	Total		49	8	3	0	0	0	0	0	52	8
Vancouver Whitecaps FC	MLS	2016	1	0	0	0	0	0	4	0	5	0
Vancouver Whitecaps FC	MLS	2017	0	0	0	0	0	0	0	0	0	0
Vancouver Whitecaps FC	MLS	2018	14	0	0	0	1	0	0	0	15	0
Vancouver Whitecaps FC	MLS	2019	8	0	0	0	0	0	0	0	8	0
Vancouver Whitecaps FC	Total		23	0	0	0	1	0	4	0	28	0
Valour FC	Canadian Premier League	2020	5	0	0	0	0	0	0	0	5	0
Valour FC	Canadian Premier League	2021	16	1	0	0	1	0	0	0	17	1
Valour FC	Canadian Premier League	2022	22	2	0	0	1	0	0	0	23	2
Valour FC	Total		43	3	0	0	2	0	0	0	45	3
FC Tulsa	USL Championship	2023	8	0	0	0	0	0	0	0	8	0
Detroit City	USL Championship	2023	15	0	0	0	0	0	0	0	15	0
Detroit City	USL Championship	2024	17	1	0	0	2	0	0	0	19	1
Detroit City	Total		32	1	0	0	2	0	0	0	34	1
Atlético Ottawa	Canadian Premier League	2025	11	0	0	0	1	0	–		12	0
Career Total			164	12	3	0	6	0	4	0	177	12
