= Cristian Techera =

Uruguayan footballer (born 1992)

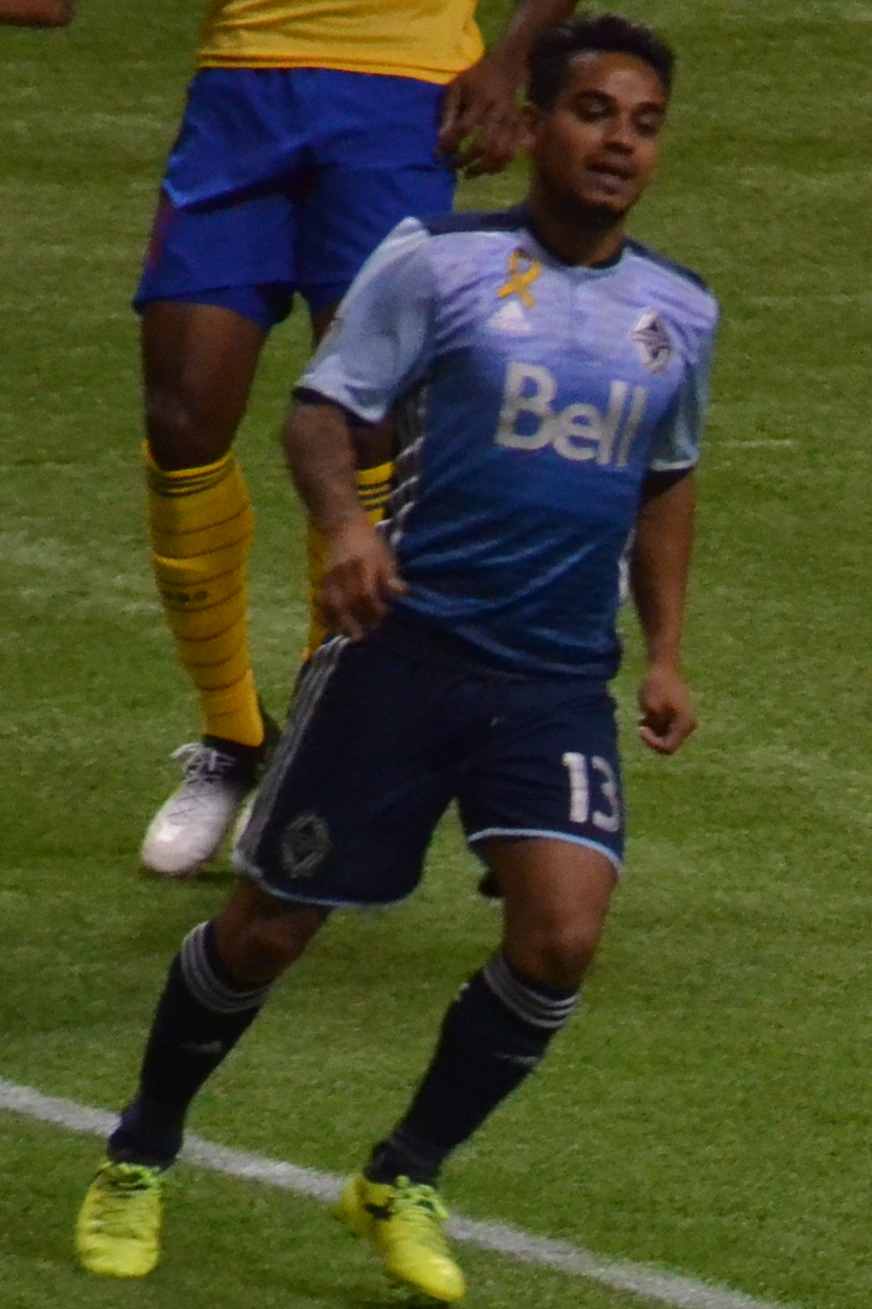
- Techera playing for Vancouver Whitecaps FC in 2017

Personal information
- Full name: Cristian Rafael Techera Cribelli
- Date of birth: May 31, 1992 (age 34)
- Place of birth: Paysandú, Uruguay
- Height: 1.57 m (5 ft 2 in)
- Positions: Winger; forward

Team information
- Current team: Sport Boys
- Number: 10

Youth career
- Peñarol
- River Plate

Senior career*
Years	Team	Apps	(Gls)
2010–2016	River Plate	74	(18)
2015	→ Vancouver Whitecaps (loan)	22	(7)
2016–2019	Vancouver Whitecaps	79	(16)
2019	→ Belgrano (loan)	3	(1)
2019–2021	Belgrano	20	(3)
2021	Atenas	17	(2)
2022	Ayacucho	24	(10)
2023	Cerro Largo	13	(0)
2024–	Sport Boys	33	(6)
- * Club domestic league appearances and goals as of 27 October 2024

Cristian Rafael Techera Cribelli (born May 31, 1992) is a Uruguayan footballer who plays as a forward for Sport Boys.

== Career ==
Techera began his career in 2010 with River Plate Montevideo, where he played for five seasons.

He was loaned out to Major League Soccer club Vancouver Whitecaps FC on April 9, 2015. Techera signed permanently with Vancouver on January 4, 2016.

== Style of play ==
Upon signing the player on loan in 2015, former Vancouver Whitecaps coach Carl Robinson described Techera as "a quick natural winger, who can play on both sides of the pitch. He has great technical ability and will excite in the attacking third." His MLS Profile describes him as "a technical, speedy winger capable of both scoring and setting up his teammates. The Uruguayan makes up for his small frame with speed and an ability to withstand physical play from opposing defenders." A diminutive midfielder or forward, his nickname is "the bug," due to his small stature.

== Honours ==
Vancouver Whitecaps

- Canadian Championship: 2015
