= Aaron Maund =

American soccer player

Personal information
- Full name: Aaron Michael Thomas Maund
- Date of birth: September 19, 1990 (age 36)
- Place of birth: Dorchester, Massachusetts, U.S.
- Height: 6 ft 1 in (1.85 m)
- Position: Defender

Youth career
- FC Greater Boston

College career
Years	Team	Apps	(Gls)
2008–2011	Notre Dame Fighting Irish		

Senior career*
Years	Team	Apps	(Gls)
2011	Indiana Invaders	3	(0)
2012	Toronto FC	15	(0)
2013–2017	Real Salt Lake	64	(2)
2014	→ San Antonio Scorpions (loan)	1	(0)
2015	→ Real Monarchs (loan)	1	(0)
2017	→ Real Monarchs (loan)	1	(0)
2017–2018	Vancouver Whitecaps FC	12	(0)
2019–2020	Charlotte Independence	38	(3)

International career^{‡}
2007	Trinidad and Tobago U17	3	(0)
2008–2009	United States U20	8	(0)
Medal record
Representing United States
Runner-up	CONCACAF U-20 Championship	2009
- * Club domestic league appearances and goals as of April 18, 2022 ‡ National team caps and goals as of January 13, 2012

Aaron Michael Thomas Maund (born September 19, 1990) is an American former professional soccer player who most recently played for Charlotte Independence in the USL Championship.

== Career ==
=== Youth and college ===
Maund played four years at The Roxbury Latin School in Boston, Massachusetts and four years with the Notre Dame Fighting Irish, starting 77 matches in his college career.

=== Professional ===
Maund was selected 12th overall by Toronto FC in the first round of the 2012 MLS SuperDraft. On March 17, 2012, Maund made his debut for Toronto as a first half sub for Torsten Frings in a 3–1 away defeat to Seattle Sounders FC. On December 3, 2012, Maund was traded to Real Salt Lake in exchange for Justin Braun.

On August 9, 2017, Maund was traded to Vancouver Whitecaps FC in exchange for a third-round pick in the 2018 MLS SuperDraft. Maund was released by Vancouver at the end of their 2018 season.

Maund was on-trial at D.C. United prior to the beginning of the 2020 MLS season.

== International ==
Maund represented the United States at the FIFA Under-20 World Cup in 2009. Two years prior, Maund played for Trinidad & Tobago in the FIFA Under-17 World Cup.

== Honors ==
=== Toronto FC ===
- Canadian Championship: 2012

=== Real Salt Lake ===
- Major League Soccer Western Conference Championship: 2013
