= List of Major League Soccer transfers 2019 =

The following is a list of transfers for the 2019 Major League Soccer (MLS) season that have been made during the 2018–19 MLS offseason all the way through to the roster freeze on September 15, 2019.

== Transfers ==
List of 2019 MLS transfers
Date	Name	Moving from	Moving to	Mode of Transfer
September 17, 2018	(United States) Brenden Aaronson	(United States) Bethlehem Steel	Philadelphia Union	Homegrown player
September 17, 2018	(United States) Jonathan Lewis	New York City	(United States) Louisville City	Loan
October 2, 2018	(United States) Tyler Freeman	(United States) Sporting Kansas City Academy	Sporting Kansas City	Homegrown player
October 4, 2018	(Ghana) Mohammed Abu	Columbus Crew	(Norway) Vålerenga	Transfer
October 6, 2018	(Mexico) Julián Vázquez	(United States) Real Salt Lake Academy	Real Salt Lake	Homegrown player
October 30, 2018	(Sweden) Erik McCue	(United States) Houston Dynamo Academy	Houston Dynamo	Homegrown player
November 16, 2018	(Canada) Clément Bayiha	(Canada) Ottawa Fury	Montreal Impact	Homegrown player
November 16, 2018	(Canada) Daniel Kinumbe	(Canada) Ottawa Fury	Montreal Impact	Homegrown player
November 19, 2018	(United States) Corben Bone	(United States) FC Cincinnati (USL)	FC Cincinnati	Free
November 20, 2018	(Mexico) Daniel Ríos	(Mexico) Guadalajara	Nashville SC (MLS)	Transfer
November 20, 2018	(Mexico) Daniel Ríos	Nashville SC (MLS)	(United States) Nashville SC	Loan
November 21, 2018	(Colombia) Eddie Segura	(Colombia) Atlético Huila	Los Angeles FC	Loan
November 26, 2018	(Argentina) Emmanuel Ledesma	(United States) FC Cincinnati (USL)	FC Cincinnati	Free
November 27, 2018	(Brazil) Nicolas Firmino	(United States) New England Revolution Academy	New England Revolution	Homegrown player
November 27, 2018	(Egypt) Amro Tarek	(Egypt) Wadi Degla	Orlando City SC	Transfer
November 28, 2018	(United States) Luis Arriaga	(United States) Real Salt Lake Academy	Real Salt Lake	Homegrown player
November 28, 2018	(United States) Sam Hamilton	Colorado Rapids	(United States) New Mexico United	Free
November 28, 2018	(United States) David Ochoa	(United States) Real Monarchs	Real Salt Lake	Homegrown player
November 29, 2018	(France) Thomas de Villardi	Minnesota United FC	(United States) Austin Bold	Free
November 29, 2018	(United States) Kevin Partida	(United States) Reno 1868	San Jose Earthquakes	Transfer
December 1, 2018	(Spain) David Villa	New York City	(Japan) Vissel Kobe	Free
December 3, 2018	(United States) Forrest Lasso	(United States) FC Cincinnati (USL)	FC Cincinnati	Free
December 5, 2018	(Martinique) Harry Novillo	(Malaysia) Johor Darul Ta'zim	Montreal Impact	Free
December 9, 2018	(Canada) Tesho Akindele	FC Dallas	Orlando City SC	Trade
December 9, 2018	(Canada) Maxime Crépeau	Montreal Impact	Vancouver Whitecaps FC	Trade
December 9, 2018	(Germany) Fabian Herbers	Philadelphia Union	Chicago Fire	Trade
December 9, 2018	(United States) Zac MacMath	Colorado Rapids	Vancouver Whitecaps FC	Trade
December 9, 2018	(Uruguay) Nicolás Mezquida	Vancouver Whitecaps FC	Colorado Rapids	Trade
December 9, 2018	(Brazil) PC	Orlando City SC	Vancouver Whitecaps FC	Trade
December 9, 2018	(United States) Spencer Richey	Vancouver Whitecaps FC	FC Cincinnati	Trade
December 9, 2018	(England) Andy Rose	(Scotland) Motherwell	Vancouver Whitecaps FC	Free
December 9, 2018	(Argentina) Maximiliano Urruti	FC Dallas	Montreal Impact	Trade
December 10, 2018	(Palestine) Nazmi Albadawi	(United States) FC Cincinnati (USL)	FC Cincinnati	Free
December 10, 2018	(Trinidad and Tobago) Justin Hoyte	(United States) FC Cincinnati (USL)	FC Cincinnati	Free
December 10, 2018	(United States) Adam Jahn	Columbus Crew	(United States) Phoenix Rising	Free
December 10, 2018	(Costa Rica) Marvin Loría	(Costa Rica) Saprissa	Portland Timbers	Transfer
December 10, 2018	(United States) Jimmy McLaughlin	(United States) FC Cincinnati (USL)	FC Cincinnati	Free
December 10, 2018	(United States) Taylor Peay	Real Salt Lake	(United States) Louisville City	Free
December 10, 2018	(Peru) Andy Polo	(Mexico) Morelia	Portland Timbers	Transfer
December 10, 2018	(United States) Blake Smith	(United States) FC Cincinnati (USL)	FC Cincinnati	Free
December 10, 2018	(Guyana) Emery Welshman	(United States) FC Cincinnati (USL)	FC Cincinnati	Free
December 10, 2018	(Venezuela) Renzo Zambrano	(United States) Portland Timbers 2	Portland Timbers	Free
December 11, 2018	(United States) Eric Alexander	Houston Dynamo	FC Cincinnati	Expansion Draft
December 11, 2018	(Ivory Coast) Yannick Boli	Colorado Rapids	(Thailand) Ratchaburi Mitr Phol	Free
December 11, 2018	(Libya) Mohamed El Monir	Orlando City SC	Los Angeles FC	Trade
December 11, 2018	(United States) Greg Garza	Atlanta United FC	FC Cincinnati	Trade
December 11, 2018	(Sierra Leone) Kei Kamara	Vancouver Whitecaps FC	FC Cincinnati	Expansion Draft
December 11, 2018	(Sierra Leone) Kei Kamara	FC Cincinnati	Colorado Rapids	Trade
December 11, 2018	(Belgium) Roland Lamah	FC Dallas	FC Cincinnati	Expansion Draft
December 11, 2018	(Jamaica) Darren Mattocks	D.C. United	FC Cincinnati	Expansion Draft
December 11, 2018	(Portugal) João Moutinho	Los Angeles FC	Orlando City SC	Trade
December 11, 2018	(Cameroon) Hassan Ndam	New York Red Bulls	FC Cincinnati	Expansion Draft
December 11, 2018	(Egypt) Amro Tarek	Orlando City SC	New York Red Bulls	Trade
December 11, 2018	(Costa Rica) Kendall Waston	Vancouver Whitecaps FC	FC Cincinnati	Trade
December 12, 2018	(United States) Marcus Epps	Philadelphia Union	New York Red Bulls	Waiver Draft
December 12, 2018	(United States) Ricky Lopez-Espin	Real Salt Lake	Los Angeles FC	Waiver Draft
December 12, 2018	(Panama) Cristian Martínez	Columbus Crew	Chicago Fire	Waiver Draft
December 12, 2018	(United States) Tony Rocha	Orlando City SC	New York City	Trade
December 12, 2018	(Mexico) Víctor Ulloa	FC Dallas	FC Cincinnati	Trade
December 12, 2018	(Costa Rica) Marco Ureña	Los Angeles FC	Chicago Fire	Waiver Draft
December 13, 2018	(United States) Kharlton Belmar	Sporting Kansas City	(United States) Nashville SC	Free
December 13, 2018	(United States) Connor Sparrow	Real Salt Lake	(United States) Nashville SC	Free
December 13, 2018	(Poland) Przemysław Tytoń	(Spain) Deportivo La Coruña	FC Cincinnati	Free
December 14, 2018	(Colombia) Eduard Atuesta	(Colombia) Independiente Medellín	Los Angeles FC	Transfer
December 14, 2018	(United States) Nick DeLeon	D.C. United	Toronto FC	Re-Entry Draft
December 14, 2018	(United States) Erik Hurtado	Vancouver Whitecaps FC	Sporting Kansas City	Trade
December 14, 2018	(United States) Clint Irwin	Toronto FC	Colorado Rapids	Trade
December 14, 2018	(United States) Andre Rawls	New York City	Colorado Rapids	Re-Entry Draft
December 14, 2018	(Brazil) Sergio Santos	(Chile) Audax Italiano	Philadelphia Union	Transfer
December 14, 2018	(United States) Donny Toia	Orlando City SC	Real Salt Lake	Re-Entry Draft
December 14, 2018	(Costa Rica) Rodney Wallace	New York City	Sporting Kansas City	Free
December 16, 2018	(United States) Russell Cicerone	FC Cincinnati	(United States) Saint Louis FC	Free
December 17, 2018	(Brazil) Auro Jr.	(Brazil) São Paulo	Toronto FC	Transfer
December 17, 2018	(United States) Chris Duvall	Montreal Impact	Houston Dynamo	Trade
December 18, 2018	(United States) Matt Bahner	FC Cincinnati	(United States) Saint Louis FC	Free
December 18, 2018	(Switzerland) Leonardo Bertone	(Switzerland) Young Boys	FC Cincinnati	Transfer
December 18, 2018	(United States) Edgar Castillo	Colorado Rapids	New England Revolution	Trade
December 18, 2018	(Canada) Amer Đidić	Sporting Kansas City	(United States) San Antonio FC	Free
December 18, 2018	(Brazil) Juninho	(Mexico) Tijuana	LA Galaxy	Free
December 18, 2018	(Czech Republic) Zdeněk Ondrášek	(Poland) Wisła Kraków	FC Dallas	Transfer
December 18, 2018	(United States) Kelyn Rowe	New England Revolution	Colorado Rapids	Trade
December 18, 2018	(United States) Kelyn Rowe	Colorado Rapids	Sporting Kansas City	Trade
December 18, 2018	(Chile) Diego Rubio	Sporting Kansas City	Colorado Rapids	Trade
December 19, 2018	(France) Mathieu Deplagne	(France) Troyes	FC Cincinnati	Transfer
December 19, 2018	(United States) Earl Edwards Jr.	Orlando City SC	D.C. United	Trade
December 19, 2018	(Trinidad and Tobago) Greg Ranjitsingh	(United States) Louisville City	Orlando City SC	Free
December 19, 2018	(United States) Keegan Rosenberry	Philadelphia Union	Colorado Rapids	Trade
December 19, 2018	(United States) Kyle Smith	(United States) Louisville City	Orlando City SC	Free
December 20, 2018	(Colombia) Juan Fernando Caicedo	(Colombia) Independiente Medellín	New England Revolution	Loan
December 20, 2018	(Slovakia) Ján Greguš	(Denmark) Copenhagen	Minnesota United FC	Transfer
December 20, 2018	(Brazil) Judson	(Brazil) Tombense	San Jose Earthquakes	Loan
December 20, 2018	(United States) Matt Lampson	Minnesota United FC	LA Galaxy	Re-Entry Draft
December 20, 2018	(England) Cameron Lancaster	(United States) Louisville City	Nashville SC (MLS)	Free
December 20, 2018	(England) Cameron Lancaster	Nashville SC (MLS)	(United States) Nashville SC	Loan
December 20, 2018	(Uruguay) Enzo Martínez	Colorado Rapids	(United States) Charlotte Independence	Free
December 20, 2018	(United States) Tommy McNamara	New York City	Houston Dynamo	Re-Entry Draft
December 21, 2018	(Brazil) Bressan	(Brazil) Grêmio	FC Dallas	Transfer
December 21, 2018	(United States) Matt Freese	(United States) Harvard Crimson	Philadelphia Union	Homegrown player
December 21, 2018	(Argentina) Milton Valenzuela	(Argentina) Newell's Old Boys	Columbus Crew	Transfer
December 21, 2018	(Argentina) Matías Vera	(Argentina) San Lorenzo	Houston Dynamo	Transfer
December 22, 2018	(United States) Caleb Calvert	Colorado Rapids	(United States) Saint Louis FC	Free
December 22, 2018	(Israel) Dekel Keinan	FC Cincinnati	(United States) Sacramento Republic	Free
December 22, 2018	(Panama) Adolfo Machado	Houston Dynamo	(Bolivia) The Strongest	Free
December 24, 2018	(England) Jack Barmby	Portland Timbers	(United States) San Antonio FC	Free
December 24, 2018	(Slovenia) Aljaž Struna	(Italy) Palermo	Houston Dynamo	Transfer
December 27, 2018	(United States) Joe Bendik	Orlando City SC	Columbus Crew	Trade
December 27, 2018	(Belgium) Laurent Ciman	(France) Dijon	Toronto FC	Free
December 27, 2018	(Brazil) Marcelo	(Portugal) Sporting CP	Chicago Fire	Transfer
December 27, 2018	(Jamaica) Alvas Powell	Portland Timbers	FC Cincinnati	Trade
December 27, 2018	(Peru) Yoshimar Yotún	Orlando City SC	(Mexico) Cruz Azul	Transfer
December 28, 2018	(United States) Danilo Acosta	Real Salt Lake	Orlando City SC	Loan
December 28, 2018	(Mexico) Tony Alfaro	Seattle Sounders FC	(Mexico) Guadalajara	Free
December 28, 2018	(United States) Jonathan Campbell	Chicago Fire	Seattle Sounders FC	Trade
December 28, 2018	(Ecuador) Jhegson Méndez	(Ecuador) Independiente del Valle	Orlando City SC	Transfer
December 30, 2018	(United States) Brek Shea	Vancouver Whitecaps FC	Atlanta United FC	Free
December 31, 2018	(Netherlands) Michael de Leeuw	Chicago Fire	(Netherlands) Emmen	Free
December 31, 2018	(United States) Benji Michel	(United States) Portland Pilots	Orlando City SC	Homegrown player
December 31, 2018	(Argentina) Lucas Rodríguez	(Argentina) Estudiantes	D.C. United	Loan
January 1, 2019	(United States) Tyler Adams	New York Red Bulls	(Germany) RB Leipzig	Transfer
January 1, 2019	(Uruguay) José Aja	Vancouver Whitecaps FC	(Chile) Unión Española	Free
January 1, 2019	(Hungary) Botond Baráth	(Hungary) Budapest Honvéd	Sporting Kansas City	Free
January 1, 2019	(Canada) Alphonso Davies	Vancouver Whitecaps FC	(Germany) Bayern Munich	Transfer
January 1, 2019	(Jamaica) Andre Lewis	Portland Timbers	(Jamaica) Portmore United	Free
January 2, 2019	(Argentina) Cristian Espinoza	(Spain) Villarreal	San Jose Earthquakes	Loan
January 2, 2019	(Uruguay) Alejandro Silva	Montreal Impact	(Paraguay) Olimpia	Transfer
January 3, 2019	(Netherlands) Sem de Wit	FC Cincinnati	(United States) Hartford Athletic	Free
January 3, 2019	(United States) Erik Holt	(United States) UCLA Bruins	Real Salt Lake	Homegrown player
January 3, 2019	(United States) Tate Schmitt	(United States) Louisville Cardinals	Real Salt Lake	Homegrown player
January 5, 2019	(United States) Chris Richards	FC Dallas	(Germany) Bayern Munich	Transfer
January 5, 2019	(United States) Khiry Shelton	Sporting Kansas City	(Germany) SC Paderborn 07	Free
January 6, 2019	(Egypt) Ali Ghazal	Vancouver Whitecaps FC	(Portugal) Feirense	Free
January 6, 2019	(Peru) Marcos López	(Peru) Sporting Cristal	San Jose Earthquakes	Transfer
January 7, 2019	(Benin) Femi Hollinger-Janzen	New England Revolution	(United States) Birmingham Legion	Free
January 7, 2019	(Brazil) Everton Luiz	(Italy) SPAL	Real Salt Lake	Loan
January 8, 2019	(Honduras) Bryan Acosta	(Spain) Tenerife	FC Dallas	Transfer
January 8, 2019	(Italy) Matteo Mancosu	Montreal Impact	(Italy) Virtus Entella	Free
January 8, 2019	(United States) Evan Newton	FC Cincinnati	(United States) Indy Eleven	Free
January 9, 2019	(United States) Brendan Moore	(England) Rochdale	Atlanta United FC	Free
January 9, 2019	(Haiti) Steeve Saint-Duc	Los Angeles FC	(United States) Lansing Ignite	Free
January 10, 2019	(Cuba) Osvaldo Alonso	Seattle Sounders FC	Minnesota United FC	Waivers
January 10, 2019	(United States) Alex DeJohn	(Sweden) Dalkurd	Orlando City SC	Free
January 10, 2019	(United States) Will Seymore	FC Cincinnati	(United States) Reno 1868	Free
January 11, 2019	(United States) Frankie Amaya	(United States) UCLA Bruins	FC Cincinnati	SuperDraft
January 11, 2019	(Canada) Tajon Buchanan	(United States) Syracuse Orange	New England Revolution	SuperDraft
January 11, 2019	(United States) Griffin Dorsey	(United States) Indiana Hoosiers	Toronto FC	SuperDraft
January 11, 2019	(United States) Benny Feilhaber	Los Angeles FC	Colorado Rapids	Free
January 11, 2019	(United States) Marlon Hairston	Colorado Rapids	Houston Dynamo	Trade
January 11, 2019	(Somalia) Siad Haji	(United States) VCU Rams	San Jose Earthquakes	SuperDraft
January 11, 2019	(United States) John Nelson	(United States) North Carolina Tar Heels	FC Dallas	SuperDraft
January 11, 2019	(Colombia) Santiago Patiño	(United States) FIU Panthers	Orlando City SC	SuperDraft
January 11, 2019	(United States) Chris Seitz	Houston Dynamo	D.C. United	Trade
January 11, 2019	(Brazil) Andre Shinyashiki	(United States) Denver Pioneers	Colorado Rapids	SuperDraft
January 11, 2019	(Canada) Dayne St. Clair	(United States) Maryland Terrapins	Minnesota United FC	SuperDraft
January 11, 2019	(Jamaica) Peter-Lee Vassell	(Jamaica) Harbour View	Los Angeles FC	Loan/Super Draft
January 11, 2019	(United States) JJ Williams	(United States) Kentucky Wildcats	Columbus Crew	SuperDraft
January 11, 2019	(Ghana) Joshua Yaro	Philadelphia Union	(United States) San Antonio FC	Free
January 13, 2019	(United States) Amando Moreno	(United States) New York Red Bulls II	Chicago Fire	Transfer
January 14, 2019	(United States) Brian Sylvestre	LA Galaxy	(United States) Forward Madison	Free
January 15, 2019	(United States) Ian Harkes	D.C. United	(Scotland) Dundee United	Free
January 15, 2019	(United States) Matt Hundley	(United States) UCLA Bruins	Colorado Rapids	Homegrown player
January 15, 2019	(United States) Trey Muse	(United States) Indiana Hoosiers	Seattle Sounders FC	Homegrown player
January 15, 2019	(England) Dion Pereira	(England) Watford	Atlanta United FC	Transfer
January 15, 2019	(United States) Sam Raben	(United States) Wake Forest Demon Deacons	Colorado Rapids	Homegrown player
January 15, 2019	(Switzerland) Jérôme Thiesson	Minnesota United FC	(Switzerland) Rapperswil-Jona	Free
January 16, 2019	(Jamaica) Dane Kelly	D.C. United	(United States) Indy Eleven	Free
January 16, 2019	(Brazil) Ruan	(Brazil) Barra da Tijuca	Orlando City SC	Loan
January 17, 2019	(United States) Kyle Fisher	Montreal Impact	(United States) Birmingham Legion	Free
January 17, 2019	(United States) Danny Musovski	San Jose Earthquakes	(United States) Reno 1868	Transfer
January 17, 2019	(Cameroon) Bertrand Owundi	Minnesota United FC	(Canada) Forge FC	Free
January 17, 2019	(Republic of Ireland) Richie Ryan	FC Cincinnati	(United States) El Paso Locomotive	Free
January 17, 2019	(United States) Mac Steeves	Houston Dynamo	(United States) Hartford Athletic	Free
January 18, 2019	(Canada) Derek Cornelius	(Serbia) Javor Ivanjica	Vancouver Whitecaps FC	Transfer
January 18, 2019	(Costa Rica) Allan Cruz	(Costa Rica) Herediano	FC Cincinnati	Transfer
January 18, 2019	(Slovenia) Aljaž Ivačič	(Slovenia) Olimpija Ljubljana	Portland Timbers	Transfer
January 18, 2019	(United States) Logan Ketterer	Columbus Crew	(United States) El Paso Locomotive	Free
January 18, 2019	(United States) Justin Rennicks	(United States) Indiana Hoosiers	New England Revolution	Homegrown player
January 18, 2019	(Brazil) Robinho	(Brazil) Ceará	Columbus Crew	Transfer
January 18, 2019	(Argentina) Daniel Vega	(United States) Tampa Bay Rowdies	San Jose Earthquakes	Free
January 19, 2019	(United States) Keaton Parks	(Portugal) Benfica	New York City	Loan
January 20, 2019	(Argentina) Nicolás Czornomaz	Los Angeles FC	(Argentina) Mitre	Free
January 20, 2019	(Senegal) Mohamed Thiaw	San Jose Earthquakes	(United States) Miami FC	Free
January 21, 2019	(United States) Antonio Bustamante	(United States) William & Mary Tribe	D.C. United	Homegrown player
January 21, 2019	(England) Ashley Cole	LA Galaxy	(England) Derby County	Free
January 21, 2019	(United States) Jake McGuire	Philadelphia Union	(Sweden) Gefle	Free
January 21, 2019	(Canada) Mark Village	FC Cincinnati	(Canada) Pacific FC	Free
January 22, 2019	(France) Aurélien Collin	New York Red Bulls	Philadelphia Union	Free
January 22, 2019	(Spain) Jon Erice	(Spain) Albacete	Vancouver Whitecaps FC	Transfer
January 22, 2019	(Poland) Przemysław Frankowski	(Poland) Jagiellonia Białystok	Chicago Fire	Transfer
January 22, 2019	(United States) Jeremiah Gutjahr	(United States) Indiana Hoosiers	Chicago Fire	Homegrown player
January 22, 2019	(United States) Sam Junqua	(United States) California Golden Bears	Houston Dynamo	SuperDraft
January 22, 2019	(United States) Aboubacar Keita	(United States) Virginia Cavaliers	Columbus Crew	Homegrown player
January 22, 2019	(Sierra Leone) Michael Lahoud	FC Cincinnati	(United States) San Antonio FC	Free
January 22, 2019	(Ghana) Ebenezer Ofori	(Germany) VfB Stuttgart	New York City	Loan
January 22, 2019	(Canada) Noble Okello	(Canada) Toronto FC II	Toronto FC	Homegrown player
January 22, 2019	(Brazil) Stefano Pinho	Orlando City SC	(Thailand) PT Prachuap	Free
January 22, 2019	(Costa Rica) Marco Ureña	Chicago Fire	(Costa Rica) Alajuelense	Free
January 22, 2019	(Spain) Víctor Vázquez	Toronto FC	(Qatar) Al-Arabi	Transfer
January 23, 2019	(Guinea) Lass Bangoura	(Spain) Rayo Vallecano	Vancouver Whitecaps FC	Loan
January 23, 2019	(United States) Cade Cowell	(United States) San Jose Earthquakes Academy	San Jose Earthquakes	Homegrown player
January 23, 2019	(United States) Nick Hagglund	Toronto FC	FC Cincinnati	Trade
January 23, 2019	(Scotland) Calum Mallace	Los Angeles FC	(United States) Austin Bold	Free
January 23, 2019	(United States) Donovan Pines	(United States) Maryland Terrapins	D.C. United	Homegrown player
January 23, 2019	(United States) Caleb Stanko	(Germany) SC Freiburg	FC Cincinnati	Transfer
January 24, 2019	(Argentina) Tomás Conechny	(Argentina) San Lorenzo	Portland Timbers	Loan
January 24, 2019	(Brazil) Carlos Miguel	(Austria) Red Bull Salzburg	Philadelphia Union	Loan
January 24, 2019	(France) Claude Dielna	New England Revolution	Portland Timbers	Trade
January 24, 2019	(United States) Justin Haak	(United States) New York City Academy	New York City	Homegrown player
January 24, 2019	(Argentina) Pity Martínez	(Argentina) River Plate	Atlanta United FC	Transfer
January 25, 2019	(Mexico) Uriel Antuna	(England) Manchester City	LA Galaxy	Loan
January 25, 2019	(Madagascar) Romain Métanire	(France) Reims	Minnesota United FC	Transfer
January 25, 2019	(United States) Andre Reynolds II	(United States) Chicago Fire Academy	Chicago Fire	Homegrown player
January 25, 2019	(Brazil) Lucas Venuto	Austria Wien	Vancouver Whitecaps FC	Transfer
January 26, 2019	(United States) Omir Fernandez	(United States) Wake Forest Demon Deacons	New York Red Bulls	Homegrown player
January 26, 2019	(Canada) Tosaint Ricketts	Toronto FC	(Lithuania) Sūduva	Free
January 26, 2019	(United States) Juan Pablo Torres	(Belgium) Lokeren	New York City	Transfer
January 27, 2019	(Denmark) David Ousted	D.C. United	Chicago Fire	Waivers
January 28, 2019	(United States) Luis Barraza	(United States) Marquette Golden Eagles	New York City	SuperDraft
January 28, 2019	(Venezuela) Anthony Blondell	Vancouver Whitecaps FC	(Chile) Huachipato	Loan
January 28, 2019	(United States) Ike Opara	Sporting Kansas City	Minnesota United FC	Trade
January 29, 2019	(Canada) Kwame Awuah	New York City	(Canada) Forge FC	Free
January 29, 2019	(Portugal) João Pedro	LA Galaxy	(Portugal) Tondela	Loan
January 30, 2019	(United States) Marc Burch	Minnesota United FC	(United States) Memphis 901	Free
January 30, 2019	(Honduras) Maynor Figueroa	FC Dallas	Houston Dynamo	Free
January 30, 2019	(Spain) Carles Gil	(Spain) Deportivo La Coruña	New England Revolution	Transfer
January 30, 2019	(Italy) Sebastian Giovinco	Toronto FC	(Saudi Arabia) Al-Hilal	Transfer
January 30, 2019	(South Korea) Hwang In-beom	(South Korea) Daejeon Citizen	Vancouver Whitecaps FC	Transfer
January 30, 2019	(Argentina) Leonardo Jara	(Argentina) Boca Juniors	D.C. United	Loan
January 30, 2019	(United States) Matt Polster	Chicago Fire	(Scotland) Rangers	Free
January 30, 2019	(Switzerland) Scott Sutter	Orlando City SC	Vancouver Whitecaps FC	Free
January 30, 2019	(United States) Andrew Wheeler-Omiunu	Atlanta United FC	(United States) FC Tucson	Free
January 30, 2019	(El Salvador) Rodolfo Zelaya	(El Salvador) Alianza	Los Angeles FC	Transfer
January 31, 2019	(Paraguay) Miguel Almirón	Atlanta United FC	(England) Newcastle United	Transfer
January 31, 2019	(England) Tomi Ameobi	FC Cincinnati	(Canada) FC Edmonton	Free
January 31, 2019	(Albania) Jahmir Hyka	San Jose Earthquakes	(Israel) Maccabi Netanya	Free
January 31, 2019	(Denmark) Danni König	FC Cincinnati	(Denmark) Lyngby	Free
January 31, 2019	(United States) John McCarthy	Philadelphia Union	(United States) Tampa Bay Rowdies	Free
January 31, 2019	(England) Liam Ridgewell	Portland Timbers	(England) Hull City	Free
January 31, 2019	(United States) Akeem Ward	(United States) Creighton Bluejays	D.C. United	SuperDraft
February 1, 2019	(Spain) Eloi Amagat	New York City	(Spain) Olot	Free
February 1, 2019	(Puerto Rico) Shawn Barry	Real Salt Lake	(United States) Tampa Bay Rowdies	Free
February 1, 2019	(Mexico) José Hernández	Real Salt Lake	(United States) LA Galaxy II	Free
February 1, 2019	(Tunisia) Jasser Khmiri	(Tunisia) Stade Tunisien	Vancouver Whitecaps FC	Transfer
February 2, 2019	(Uruguay) Cristian Techera	Vancouver Whitecaps FC	(Argentina) Belgrano	Free
February 4, 2019	(Liberia) Sam Johnson	(Norway) Vålerenga	Real Salt Lake	Transfer
February 4, 2019	(Romania) Alexandru Mitriță	(Romania) Universitatea Craiova	New York City	Transfer
February 5, 2019	(United States) Terrence Boyd	(Germany) SV Darmstadt 98	Toronto FC	Transfer
February 5, 2019	(Canada) Zachary Brault-Guillard	(France) Lyon II	Montreal Impact	Loan
February 5, 2019	(Costa Rica) Waylon Francis	Seattle Sounders FC	Columbus Crew	Trade
February 5, 2019	(Afghanistan) Adam Najem	Philadelphia Union	(United States) Memphis 901	Free
February 5, 2019	(Guinea) Florentin Pogba	(Turkey) Gençlerbirliği	Atlanta United FC	Discovery signing
February 5, 2019	(Rwanda) Abdul Rwatubyaye	(Rwanda) Rayon Sports	Sporting Kansas City	Transfer
February 6, 2019	(Jamaica) Rashawn Dally	(United States) Quinnipiac Bobcats	FC Cincinnati	SuperDraft
February 6, 2019	(United States) Logan Gdula	(United States) Wake Forest Demon Deacons	FC Cincinnati	SuperDraft
February 6, 2019	(United States) Jimmy Hague	(United States) Michigan State Spartans	FC Cincinnati	SuperDraft
February 6, 2019	(Germany) Ben Lundt	(United States) Akron Zips	FC Cincinnati	SuperDraft
February 6, 2019	(United States) Tommy McCabe	(United States) Notre Dame Fighting Irish	FC Cincinnati	SuperDraft
February 6, 2019	(United States) Mark Segbers	New England Revolution	(United States) Swope Park Rangers	Free
February 6, 2019	(Germany) Kai Wagner	(Germany) Würzburger Kickers	Philadelphia Union	Transfer
February 7, 2019	(Germany) Ben Lundt	FC Cincinnati	(United States) Louisville City	Loan
February 7, 2019	(Uruguay) Diego Polenta	(Uruguay) Nacional	LA Galaxy	Transfer
February 8, 2019	(Uruguay) Joaquín Ardaiz	(Switzerland) Chiasso	Vancouver Whitecaps FC	Loan
February 8, 2019	(Mexico) Marco Fabián	(Germany) Eintracht Frankfurt	Philadelphia Union	Transfer
February 8, 2019	(Argentina) Érik Godoy	(Argentina) Colón	Vancouver Whitecaps FC	Loan
February 8, 2019	(United States) Kevin Politz	New York Red Bulls	(United States) Greenville Triumph	Free
February 8, 2019	(Chile) Jeisson Vargas	Montreal Impact	(Chile) Universidad Católica	Loan
February 10, 2019	(Italy) Vito Mannone	(England) Reading	Minnesota United FC	Loan
February 12, 2019	(United States) Calle Brown	Seattle Sounders FC	(United States) Loudoun United	Free
February 12, 2019	(Denmark) Mathias Jørgensen	(Denmark) OB	New York Red Bulls	Transfer
February 12, 2019	(Republic of Ireland) Chris McCann	Atlanta United FC	D.C. United	Waivers
February 12, 2019	(Nigeria) Orji Okwonkwo	(Italy) Bologna	Montreal Impact	Loan
February 13, 2019	(Canada) Daniel Kinumbe	Montreal Impact	(Canada) Ottawa Fury	Loan
February 13, 2019	(The Gambia) Kekuta Manneh	(Switzerland) St. Gallen	FC Cincinnati	Transfer
February 14, 2019	(United States) Edwin Cerrillo	(United States) FC Dallas Academy	FC Dallas	Homegrown player
February 14, 2019	(United States) Chris Wehan	San Jose Earthquakes	(United States) New Mexico United	Free
February 15, 2019	(United States) Daniel Johnson	Chicago Fire	(United States) Birmingham Legion	Free
February 15, 2019	(United States) Tommy McCabe	FC Cincinnati	(United States) North Carolina FC	Loan
February 15, 2019	(Colombia) Fredy Montero	(Portugal) Sporting CP	Vancouver Whitecaps FC	Free
February 15, 2019	(Ghana) Dominic Oduro	San Jose Earthquakes	(United States) Charlotte Independence	Free
February 16, 2019	(United States) Hassani Dotson	(United States) Oregon State Beavers	Minnesota United FC	SuperDraft
February 16, 2019	(United States) Chase Gasper	(United States) Maryland Terrapins	Minnesota United FC	SuperDraft
February 16, 2019	(United States) Logan Gdula	FC Cincinnati	(United States) Phoenix Rising	Loan
February 16, 2019	(Mexico) Pablo Sisniega	(Spain) Real Sociedad B	Los Angeles FC	Transfer
February 17, 2019	(United States) Sean Nealis	(United States) Hofstra Pride	New York Red Bulls	SuperDraft
February 18, 2019	(Portugal) Nani	(Portugal) Sporting CP	Orlando City SC	Free
February 18, 2019	(United States) Sam Raben	Colorado Rapids	(United States) Colorado Springs Switchbacks	Loan
February 19, 2019	(Canada) Marcel de Jong	Vancouver Whitecaps FC	(Canada) Pacific FC	Free
February 20, 2019	(United States) Bradford Jamieson	LA Galaxy	(United States) San Antonio FC	Loan
February 20, 2019	(Paraguay) Jorge Moreira	(Argentina) River Plate	Portland Timbers	Loan
February 21, 2019	(Cameroon) Anatole Abang	New York Red Bulls	(China) Nantong Zhiyun	Transfer
February 21, 2019	(United States) Lamar Batista	(United States) Portland Timbers 2	Los Angeles FC	Free
February 21, 2019	(United States) Phillip Ejimadu	(Brazil) Nacional	Los Angeles FC	Free
February 21, 2019	(Canada) Callum Montgomery	(United States) Charlotte 49ers	FC Dallas	SuperDraft
February 21, 2019	(United States) Adrien Perez	(United States) Ontario Fury	Los Angeles FC	Free
February 21, 2019	(United States) Kris Reaves	FC Dallas	(United States) Colorado Springs Switchbacks	Free
February 22, 2019	(United States) Brian Rowe	Vancouver Whitecaps FC	Orlando City SC	Free
February 23, 2019	(United States) C. J. Sapong	Philadelphia Union	Chicago Fire	Trade
February 25, 2019	(Finland) Niko Hämäläinen	(England) Queens Park Rangers	Los Angeles FC	Loan
February 25, 2019	(United States) DeJuan Jones	(United States) Michigan State Spartans	New England Revolution	SuperDraft
February 25, 2019	(Ghana) Kofi Opare	D.C. United	Colorado Rapids	Free
February 25, 2019	(United States) Quentin Westberg	(France) Auxerre B	Toronto FC	Free
February 26, 2019	(United States) Saad Abdul-Salaam	New York City	Seattle Sounders FC	Trade
February 26, 2019	(United States) Justin Portillo	(United States) Real Monarchs	Real Salt Lake	Free
February 26, 2019	(United States) Dante Sealy	(United States) FC Dallas Academy	FC Dallas	Homegrown player
February 26, 2019	(United States) Dante Sealy	FC Dallas	(United States) North Texas SC	Loan
February 27, 2019	(Argentina) Emil Cuello	(United States) SMU Mustangs	LA Galaxy	SuperDraft
February 27, 2019	(United States) Alejandro Guido	(Mexico) Tijuana	Los Angeles FC	Transfer
February 27, 2019	(Norway) Ola Kamara	LA Galaxy	(China) Shenzhen	Transfer
March 1, 2019	(United States) Quincy Amarikwa	Montreal Impact	D.C. United	Free
March 1, 2019	(United States) Julián Araujo	(United States) LA Galaxy II	LA Galaxy	Transfer
March 1, 2019	(Ghana) Anderson Asiedu	(United States) Golden State Force	Atlanta United FC	SuperDraft
March 1, 2019	(Canada) Raheem Edwards	Chicago Fire	(United States) Lansing Ignite	Loan
March 1, 2019	(Venezuela) José Hernández	Atlanta United FC	(United States) Atlanta United 2	Loan
March 1, 2019	(Canada) Kamal Miller	(United States) Reading United	Orlando City SC	SuperDraft
March 1, 2019	(Nigeria) Patrick Okonkwo	Atlanta United FC	(United States) Atlanta United 2	Loan
March 2, 2019	(Guyana) Quillan Roberts	Los Angeles FC	(Canada) Forge FC	Free
March 4, 2019	(Mexico) Efraín Juárez	Vancouver Whitecaps FC	(Norway) Vålerenga	Free
March 4, 2019	(Tanzania) Ally Hamis Ng'Anzi	(Czech Republic) Vyškov	Minnesota United FC	Loan
March 4, 2019	(Tanzania) Ally Hamis Ng'Anzi	Minnesota United FC	(United States) Forward Madison	Loan
March 4, 2019	(Spain) Alejandro Pozuelo	(Belgium) Genk	Toronto FC	Transfer
March 5, 2019	(United States) Jeff Caldwell	New York City	(United States) Memphis 901	Loan
March 5, 2019	(Jamaica) Rashawn Dally	FC Cincinnati	(United States) Memphis 901	Loan
March 5, 2019	(Cape Verde) Jamiro	(France) Metz	Philadelphia Union	Loan
March 6, 2019	(Lithuania) Vytautas Andriuškevičius	D.C. United	(Lithuania) Sūduva	Free
March 6, 2019	(United States) Joe Corona	(Mexico) Tijuana	LA Galaxy	Transfer
March 6, 2019	(Canada) Aidan Daniels	Toronto FC	(Canada) Ottawa Fury	Loan
March 6, 2019	(United States) Matt Hundley	Colorado Rapids	(United States) Colorado Springs Switchbacks	Loan
March 6, 2019	(United States) Aboubacar Keita	Columbus Crew	(United States) Richmond Kickers	Loan
March 6, 2019	(United States) Ben Lundgaard	Columbus Crew	(United States) Pittsburgh Riverhounds	Loan
March 6, 2019	(United States) Brendan McDonough	(United States) Georgetown Hoyas	Vancouver Whitecaps FC	SuperDraft
March 6, 2019	(United States) Andre Rawls	Colorado Rapids	(United States) Colorado Springs Switchbacks	Loan
March 6, 2019	(United States) Kenny Saief	(Belgium) Anderlecht	FC Cincinnati	Loan
March 6, 2019	(Mexico) Luis Silva	Real Salt Lake	(Finland) Honka	Free
March 6, 2019	(Canada) Ryan Telfer	Toronto FC	(Canada) York 9 FC	Loan
March 6, 2019	(France) Diedie Traore	(United States) LA Galaxy II	LA Galaxy	Transfer
March 7, 2019	(United States) Saad Abdul-Salaam	Seattle Sounders FC	(United States) Tacoma Defiance	Loan
March 7, 2019	(United States) Lamar Batista	Los Angeles FC	(United States) Phoenix Rising	Loan
March 7, 2019	(Norway) Jo Inge Berget	New York City	(Sweden) Malmö	Free
March 7, 2019	(United States) Jonathan Campbell	Seattle Sounders FC	(United States) Tacoma Defiance	Loan
March 7, 2019	(Canada) David Choinière	Montreal Impact	(Canada) Forge FC	Free
March 7, 2019	(New Zealand) Elliot Collier	Chicago Fire	(United States) Memphis 901	Loan
March 7, 2019	(Canada) Thomas Hasal	(Canada) Vancouver Whitecaps U-23	Vancouver Whitecaps FC	Homegrown player
March 7, 2019	(New Zealand) Stefan Marinovic	Vancouver Whitecaps FC	(England) Bristol City	Free
March 7, 2019	(United States) Trey Muse	Seattle Sounders FC	(United States) Tacoma Defiance	Loan
March 7, 2019	(United States) Alex Roldan	Seattle Sounders FC	(United States) Tacoma Defiance	Loan
March 8, 2019	(United States) Gabriel Slonina	(United States) Chicago Fire Academy	Chicago Fire	Homegrown player
March 8, 2019	(Guyana) Emery Welshman	FC Cincinnati	(Canada) Forge FC	Loan
March 8, 2019	(United States) Ethan Zubak	(United States) LA Galaxy II	LA Galaxy	Homegrown player
March 9, 2019	(Iraq) Ali Adnan	(Italy) Udinese	Vancouver Whitecaps FC	Loan
March 9, 2019	(Kenya) Abdi Mohamed	(United States) Akron Zips	New York City	SuperDraft
March 9, 2019	(Kenya) Abdi Mohamed	New York City	(United States) Memphis 901	Loan
March 10, 2019	(Spain) Javier Pérez	(United States) Pittsburgh Panthers	Los Angeles FC	SuperDraft
March 12, 2019	(Sweden) Robin Jansson	(Sweden) AIK	Orlando City SC	Transfer
March 13, 2019	(United States) Aaron Maund	Vancouver Whitecaps FC	(United States) Charlotte Independence	Free
March 13, 2019	(Mexico) Ricardo Pérez	Colorado Rapids	(United States) Lansing Ignite	Free
March 14, 2019	(United States) Tristan Blackmon	Los Angeles FC	(United States) Phoenix Rising	Loan
March 14, 2019	(United States) Shaft Brewer	Los Angeles FC	(United States) Phoenix Rising	Loan
March 14, 2019	(Argentina) Nicolás Gaitán	(China) Dalian Yifang	Chicago Fire	Free
March 14, 2019	(Haiti) Zachary Herivaux	New England Revolution	(United States) Birmingham Legion	Loan
March 14, 2019	(Benin) Cédric Hountondji	New York City	(Bulgaria) Levski Sofia	Free
March 14, 2019	(Spain) Javier Pérez	Los Angeles FC	(United States) Phoenix Rising	Loan
March 14, 2019	(United States) Joshua Pérez	Los Angeles FC	(United States) Phoenix Rising	Loan
March 14, 2019	(Belize) Michael Salazar	Montreal Impact	(United States) Rio Grande Valley Toros	Free
March 14, 2019	(Canada) Brian Wright	New England Revolution	(United States) Birmingham Legion	Loan
March 15, 2019	(United States) Hugo Arellano	LA Galaxy	(United States) Orange County	Loan
March 15, 2019	(United States) Alex Crognale	Columbus Crew	(United States) Indy Eleven	Loan
March 15, 2019	(United States) Clint Irwin	Colorado Rapids	(United States) Colorado Springs Switchbacks	Loan
March 15, 2019	(Kenya) Lawrence Olum	Portland Timbers	Minnesota United FC	Free
March 15, 2019	(Ghana) Kofi Opare	Colorado Rapids	(United States) Colorado Springs Switchbacks	Loan
March 15, 2019	(United States) Jonathan Spector	Orlando City SC	(Scotland) Hibernian	Free
March 15, 2019	(United States) Mason Stajduhar	Orlando City SC	(United States) Tulsa Roughnecks	Loan
March 16, 2019	(Costa Rica) Roy Miller	Portland Timbers	(United States) Portland Timbers 2	Free
March 18, 2019	(United States) Pierre da Silva	Orlando City SC	(Brazil) Athletico Paranaense	Loan
March 18, 2019	(Canada) Michael Petrasso	Montreal Impact	(Canada) Valour FC	Free
March 19, 2019	(United States) Griffin Yow	(United States) D.C. United Academy	D.C. United	Homegrown player
March 20, 2019	(Spain) Jon Bakero	Toronto FC	(United States) Phoenix Rising	Loan
March 21, 2019	(England) Mo Adams	Chicago Fire	(United States) Memphis 901	Loan
March 21, 2019	(Brazil) Héber	(Croatia) Rijeka	New York City	Transfer
March 21, 2019	(Guatemala) Moisés Hernández	FC Dallas	(United States) San Antonio FC	Loan
March 21, 2019	(Canada) Richie Laryea	Orlando City SC	Toronto FC	Free
March 21, 2019	(United States) Ricky Lopez-Espin	Los Angeles FC	(United States) Lansing Ignite	Free
March 22, 2019	(United States) Tyler Deric	Houston Dynamo	(United States) Rio Grande Valley Toros	Loan
March 22, 2019	(United States) Chris Duvall	Houston Dynamo	(United States) Rio Grande Valley Toros	Loan
March 22, 2019	(Venezuela) Alejandro Fuenmayor	Houston Dynamo	(United States) Rio Grande Valley Toros	Loan
March 22, 2019	(United States) Sam Junqua	Houston Dynamo	(United States) Rio Grande Valley Toros	Loan
March 22, 2019	(United States) Jordan McCrary	Seattle Sounders FC	(United States) Sacramento Republic	Free
March 22, 2019	(Ghana) Edward Opoku	Columbus Crew	(United States) Birmingham Legion	Loan
March 26, 2019	(Germany) Amar Sejdič	(United States) Maryland Terrapins	Montreal Impact	SuperDraft
March 27, 2019	(United States) Marshall Hollingsworth	Columbus Crew	(United States) Lansing Ignite	Free
March 28, 2019	(Colombia) Juan David Cabezas	Houston Dynamo	(United States) Rio Grande Valley Toros	Loan
March 28, 2019	(United States) Mike da Fonte	Colorado Rapids	(United States) OKC Energy	Free
March 28, 2019	(Sweden) Erik McCue	Houston Dynamo	(United States) Rio Grande Valley Toros	Loan
March 28, 2019	(United States) Michael Nelson	Houston Dynamo	(United States) Rio Grande Valley Toros	Loan
March 29, 2019	(United States) Phillip Ejimadu	Los Angeles FC	(United States) FC Tucson	Loan
March 29, 2019	(United States) Patrick McLain	Chicago Fire	(United States) Orange County	Free
April 1, 2019	(United States) Will Bruin	Seattle Sounders FC	(United States) Tacoma Defiance	Loan
April 1, 2019	(Kenya) Handwalla Bwana	Seattle Sounders FC	(United States) Tacoma Defiance	Loan
April 1, 2019	(Martinique) Jordy Delem	Seattle Sounders FC	(United States) Tacoma Defiance	Loan
April 1, 2019	(United States) Bryan Meredith	Seattle Sounders FC	(United States) Tacoma Defiance	Loan
April 1, 2019	(Cameroon) Nouhou Tolo	Seattle Sounders FC	(United States) Tacoma Defiance	Loan
April 1, 2019	(Colombia) Joel Qwiberg	San Jose Earthquakes	(Sweden) Örgryte	Free
April 1, 2019	(Panama) Román Torres	Seattle Sounders FC	(United States) Tacoma Defiance	Loan
April 2, 2019	(Liechtenstein) Nicolas Hasler	Chicago Fire	Sporting Kansas City	Free
April 3, 2019	(United States) Sebastian Anderson	(United States) Colorado Rapids Academy	Colorado Rapids	Homegrown player
April 4, 2019	(United States) R. J. Allen	Orlando City SC	(United States) FC Motown	Free
April 4, 2019	(United States) Carter Manley	Minnesota United FC	(United States) Forward Madison	Loan
April 4, 2019	(United States) Wyatt Omsberg	Minnesota United FC	(United States) Forward Madison	Loan
April 4, 2019	(Canada) Dayne St. Clair	Minnesota United FC	(United States) Forward Madison	Loan
April 4, 2019	(United States) Mason Toye	Minnesota United FC	(United States) Forward Madison	Loan
April 5, 2019	(Colombia) Juan David Cabezas	Houston Dynamo	(United States) Rio Grande Valley Toros	Loan
April 5, 2019	(United States) Tyler Deric	Houston Dynamo	(United States) Rio Grande Valley Toros	Loan
April 5, 2019	(Venezuela) Alejandro Fuenmayor	Houston Dynamo	(United States) Rio Grande Valley Toros	Loan
April 5, 2019	(United States) Kevin Garcia	Houston Dynamo	(United States) Rio Grande Valley Toros	Loan
April 5, 2019	(United States) Sam Junqua	Houston Dynamo	(United States) Rio Grande Valley Toros	Loan
April 8, 2019	(United States) Blake Smith	FC Cincinnati	(Canada) Pacific FC	Loan
April 9, 2019	(Canada) Louis Béland-Goyette	Montreal Impact	(Canada) Valour FC	Free
April 9, 2019	(United States) Danny Leyva	(United States) Tacoma Defiance	Seattle Sounders FC	Homegrown player
April 11, 2019	(Costa Rica) Giancarlo González	(Italy) Bologna	LA Galaxy	Transfer
April 12, 2019	(United States) Luis Argudo	Columbus Crew	(United States) Hartford Athletic	Loan
April 12, 2019	(United States) Niki Jackson	Colorado Rapids	(United States) Charlotte Independence	Loan
April 12, 2019	(United States) Sam Junqua	Houston Dynamo	(United States) Rio Grande Valley Toros	Loan
April 12, 2019	(United States) Jon Kempin	Columbus Crew	(United States) Hartford Athletic	Loan
April 12, 2019	(United States) Cameron Lindley	Orlando City SC	(United States) Memphis 901	Loan
April 12, 2019	(United States) JJ Williams	Columbus Crew	(United States) Birmingham Legion	Loan
April 16, 2019	(Panama) Omar Browne	(Panama) Independiente La Chorrera	Montreal Impact	Loan
April 17, 2019	(United States) Frankie Amaya	FC Cincinnati	(United States) Orange County	Loan
April 18, 2019	(Jamaica) Demar Phillips	Real Salt Lake	(United States) Austin Bold	Free
April 20, 2019	(United States) Michael Nelson	Houston Dynamo	(United States) Rio Grande Valley Toros	Loan
April 23, 2019	(United States) Collin Martin	Minnesota United FC	(United States) Hartford Athletic	Loan
April 24, 2019	(United States) Tyler Deric	Houston Dynamo	(United States) Rio Grande Valley Toros	Loan
April 25, 2019	(Norway) Muhamed Keita	New York Red Bulls	(Norway) Strømsgodset	Free
April 26, 2019	(Germany) Amar Sejdič	Montreal Impact	(Canada) Ottawa Fury	Loan
April 30, 2019	(United States) Tyler Deric	Houston Dynamo	(United States) Rio Grande Valley Toros	Loan
April 30, 2019	(United States) Kevin Garcia	Houston Dynamo	(United States) Rio Grande Valley Toros	Loan
May 1, 2019	(Cameroon) Hassan Ndam	FC Cincinnati	(United States) Charlotte Independence	Loan
May 1, 2019	(United States) Alfonso Ocampo-Chavez	(United States) Tacoma Defiance	Seattle Sounders FC	Homegrown player
May 3, 2019	(Costa Rica) Francisco Calvo	Minnesota United FC	Chicago Fire	Trade
May 3, 2019	(United States) Charlie Lyon	(United States) Portland Timbers 2	Philadelphia Union	Transfer
May 3, 2019	(Brazil) Marquinhos Pedroso	FC Dallas	D.C. United	Waivers
May 6, 2019	(Argentina) Brian Fernández	(Mexico) Necaxa	Portland Timbers	Transfer
May 6, 2019	(Costa Rica) David Guzmán	Portland Timbers	Columbus Crew	Trade
May 7, 2019	(Argentina) Favio Álvarez	(Argentina) Atlético Tucumán	LA Galaxy	Loan
May 7, 2019	(United States) Kenneth Kronholm	(Germany) Holstein Kiel	Chicago Fire	Transfer
May 7, 2019	(Iraq) Justin Meram	Columbus Crew	Atlanta United FC	Trade
May 8, 2019	(Ghana) Lalas Abubakar	Columbus Crew	Colorado Rapids	Loan
May 8, 2019	(Ghana) David Accam	Philadelphia Union	Columbus Crew	Trade
May 8, 2019	(Ecuador) Xavier Arreaga	(Ecuador) Barcelona	Seattle Sounders FC	Transfer
May 8, 2019	(United States) Tom Barlow	(United States) New York Red Bulls II	New York Red Bulls	Transfer
May 8, 2019	(United States) Benny Feilhaber	Colorado Rapids	Sporting Kansas City	Trade
May 8, 2019	(Trinidad and Tobago) Joevin Jones	(Germany) Darmstadt 98	Seattle Sounders FC	Transfer
May 8, 2019	(United States) Jonathan Lewis	New York City	Colorado Rapids	Trade
May 8, 2019	(Democratic Republic of the Congo) Michee Ngalina	(United States) Bethlehem Steel	Philadelphia Union	Transfer
May 8, 2019	(Rwanda) Abdul Rwatubyaye	Sporting Kansas City	Colorado Rapids	Trade
May 9, 2019	(United States) Derrick Jones	Philadelphia Union	Nashville SC (MLS)	Trade
May 9, 2019	(United States) Derrick Jones	Nashville SC (MLS)	(United States) Nashville SC	Loan
May 9, 2019	(United States) JJ Williams	Columbus Crew	(United States) Birmingham Legion	Loan
May 10, 2019	(United States) Michael Nelson	Houston Dynamo	(United States) Rio Grande Valley Toros	Loan
May 13, 2019	(United States) Lagos Kunga	Atlanta United FC	(United States) Memphis 901	Loan
May 16, 2019	(United States) Stefan Cleveland	Chicago Fire	(United States) Lansing Ignite	Loan
May 16, 2019	(United States) Grant Lillard	Chicago Fire	(United States) Lansing Ignite	Loan
May 17, 2019	(United States) Wilson Harris	(United States) Swope Park Rangers	Sporting Kansas City	Short-Term Agreement
May 17, 2019	(Rwanda) Abdul Rwatubyaye	Colorado Rapids	(United States) Colorado Springs Switchbacks	Loan
May 18, 2019	(United States) Chris Duvall	Houston Dynamo	(United States) Rio Grande Valley Toros	Loan
May 18, 2019	(United States) Sam Junqua	Houston Dynamo	(United States) Rio Grande Valley Toros	Loan
May 18, 2019	(Sweden) Erik McCue	Houston Dynamo	(United States) Rio Grande Valley Toros	Loan
May 21, 2019	(Ecuador) Romario Ibarra	Minnesota United FC	(Mexico) Pachuca	Loan
May 24, 2019	(Costa Rica) Diego Campos	Chicago Fire	(United States) Lansing Ignite	Loan
May 24, 2019	(United States) Michael Nelson	Houston Dynamo	(United States) Rio Grande Valley Toros	Loan
May 29, 2019	(Palestine) Nazmi Albadawi	FC Cincinnati	(United States) North Carolina FC	Loan
May 29, 2019	(United States) Jose Villarreal	Orlando City SC	(United States) Las Vegas Lights	Free
June 3, 2019	(United States) Omar Gonzalez	(Mexico) Pachuca	Toronto FC	Transfer
June 4, 2019	(Canada) Luca Ricci	(Canada) Ottawa Fury	Montreal Impact	Short-Term Agreement
June 4, 2019	(Canada) Karifa Yao	(Canada) Montreal Impact Academy	Montreal Impact	Homegrown player
June 7, 2019	(Canada) Dejan Jaković	Los Angeles FC	(United States) Las Vegas Lights	Loan
June 8, 2019	(United States) Michael Nelson	Houston Dynamo	(United States) Rio Grande Valley Toros	Loan
June 10, 2019	(Portugal) André Horta	Los Angeles FC	(Portugal) Sporting Braga	Transfer
June 10, 2019	(Belize) Michael Salazar	(United States) Rio Grande Valley Toros	Houston Dynamo	Transfer
June 11, 2019	(New Zealand) Kyle Adams	(United States) Rio Grande Valley Toros	Houston Dynamo	Short-Term Agreement
June 11, 2019	(Haiti) Shanyder Borgelin	(United States) Bethlehem Steel	Philadelphia Union	Short-Term Agreement
June 11, 2019	(United States) Ben Ofeimu	(United States) Bethlehem Steel	Philadelphia Union	Short-Term Agreement
June 11, 2019	(United States) Ricardo Pepi	(United States) North Texas SC	FC Dallas	Loan
June 11, 2019	(United States) Issa Rayyan	(United States) Bethlehem Steel	Philadelphia Union	Short-Term Agreement
June 11, 2019	(United States) Andrew Samuels	(United States) Rio Grande Valley Toros	Houston Dynamo	Short-Term Agreement
June 11, 2019	(United States) Zach Zandi	(United States) Bethlehem Steel	Philadelphia Union	Short-Term Agreement
June 12, 2019	(United States) Josh Atencio	(United States) Tacoma Defiance	Seattle Sounders FC	Short-Term Agreement
June 12, 2019	(Ghana) Francis Atuahene	FC Dallas	(United States) Austin Bold	Loan
June 12, 2019	(Paraguay) Josué Colmán	Orlando City SC	(Paraguay) Cerro Porteño	Loan
June 12, 2019	(Puerto Rico) Alec Diaz	(United States) Tacoma Defiance	Seattle Sounders FC	Short-Term Agreement
June 12, 2019	(United States) Azriel Gonzalez	(United States) Tacoma Defiance	Seattle Sounders FC	Short-Term Agreement
June 12, 2019	(United States) Shandon Hopeau	(United States) Tacoma Defiance	Seattle Sounders FC	Short-Term Agreement
June 12, 2019	(United States) Danny Robles	(United States) Tacoma Defiance	Seattle Sounders FC	Short-Term Agreement
June 12, 2019	(United States) Ray Serrano	(United States) Tacoma Defiance	Seattle Sounders FC	Short-Term Agreement
June 12, 2019	(Ghana) Ema Twumasi	FC Dallas	(United States) Austin Bold	Loan
June 14, 2019	(Wales) Adam Henley	Real Salt Lake	(England) Bradford City	Free
June 18, 2019	(New Zealand) Kyle Adams	(United States) Rio Grande Valley Toros	Houston Dynamo	Short-Term Agreement
June 18, 2019	(Panama) Carlos Small	(United States) Rio Grande Valley Toros	Houston Dynamo	Short-Term Agreement
June 20, 2019	(United States) Andrew Wooten	(Germany) SV Sandhausen	Philadelphia Union	Free
June 21, 2019	(United States) Ricardo Pepi	(United States) North Texas SC	FC Dallas	Homegrown player
June 21, 2019	(Canada) Jacob Shaffelburg	(Canada) Toronto FC II	Toronto FC	Homegrown player
June 22, 2019	(Republic of Ireland) Jon Gallagher	Atlanta United FC	(Scotland) Aberdeen	Loan
June 24, 2019	(Scotland) Gary Mackay-Steven	(Scotland) Aberdeen	New York City	Free
June 25, 2019	(Mexico) Carlos Fierro	(Mexico) Cruz Azul	San Jose Earthquakes	Transfer
June 28, 2019	(United States) Justin Dhillon	(United States) Tacoma Defiance	Seattle Sounders FC	Transfer
June 28, 2019	(Brazil) Everton Luiz	(Italy) SPAL	Real Salt Lake	Transfer
July 1, 2019	(Ghana) Edwin Gyasi	(Bulgaria) CSKA Sofia	FC Dallas	Loan
July 1, 2019	(United States) Emerson Hyndman	(England) AFC Bournemouth	Atlanta United FC	Loan
July 1, 2019	(Jamaica) Romario Williams	Atlanta United FC	Columbus Crew	Trade
July 2, 2019	(United States) R. J. Allen	(United States) FC Motown	Philadelphia Union	Free
July 2, 2019	(Costa Rica) Luis Díaz	(Costa Rica) Herediano	Columbus Crew	Transfer
July 2, 2019	(Ecuador) Carlos Gruezo	FC Dallas	(Germany) FC Augsburg	Transfer
July 2, 2019	(Netherlands) Maikel van der Werff	(Netherlands) Vitesse	FC Cincinnati	Free
July 5, 2019	(Iraq) Ali Adnan	(Italy) Udinese	Vancouver Whitecaps FC	Transfer
July 5, 2019	(Curaçao) Eloy Room	(Netherlands) PSV	Columbus Crew	Free
July 6, 2019	(United States) Eric Bird	Houston Dynamo	(United States) Rio Grande Valley Toros	Loan
July 6, 2019	(Mexico) Giovani dos Santos	LA Galaxy	(Mexico) América	Free
July 6, 2019	(United States) Sam Junqua	Houston Dynamo	(United States) Rio Grande Valley Toros	Loan
July 6, 2019	(Sweden) Erik McCue	Houston Dynamo	(United States) Rio Grande Valley Toros	Loan
July 6, 2019	(United States) Michael Nelson	Houston Dynamo	(United States) Rio Grande Valley Toros	Loan
July 6, 2019	(Venezuela) Ronaldo Peña	Houston Dynamo	(United States) Rio Grande Valley Toros	Loan
July 9, 2019	(Venezuela) Erickson Gallardo	(Venezuela) Zamora	Toronto FC	Transfer
July 9, 2019	(United States) Zack Steffen	Columbus Crew	(England) Manchester City	Transfer
July 10, 2019	(Argentina) Gustavo Bou	(Mexico) Tijuana	New England Revolution	Transfer
July 11, 2019	(Chile) José Bizama	(Chile) Huachipato	Houston Dynamo	Transfer
July 11, 2019	(Canada) Jordan Hamilton	Toronto FC	Columbus Crew	Trade
July 11, 2019	(United States) Patrick Mullins	Columbus Crew	Toronto FC	Trade
July 11, 2019	(Brazil) Robinho	Columbus Crew	Orlando City SC	Trade
July 12, 2019	(Argentina) Pablo Ruíz	Real Salt Lake	(Austria) Pinzgau Saalfelden	Loan
July 13, 2019	(United States) Eric Bird	Houston Dynamo	(United States) Rio Grande Valley Toros	Loan
July 13, 2019	(United States) Tyler Deric	Houston Dynamo	(United States) Rio Grande Valley Toros	Loan
July 13, 2019	(Venezuela) Alejandro Fuenmayor	Houston Dynamo	(United States) Rio Grande Valley Toros	Loan
July 13, 2019	(United States) Sam Junqua	Houston Dynamo	(United States) Rio Grande Valley Toros	Loan
July 13, 2019	(United States) Memo Rodríguez	Houston Dynamo	(United States) Rio Grande Valley Toros	Loan
July 15, 2019	(Ghana) Anderson Asiedu	Atlanta United FC	(United States) Birmingham Legion	Free
July 15, 2019	(Ghana) Kwasi Donsu	(United States) Colorado Springs Switchbacks	Colorado Rapids	Loan
July 15, 2019	(The Gambia) Ismaila Jome	(United States) Colorado Springs Switchbacks	Colorado Rapids	Loan
July 15, 2019	(United States) Jimmy Ockford	San Jose Earthquakes	(United States) Nashville SC	Loan
July 15, 2019	(United States) Kris Reaves	(United States) Colorado Springs Switchbacks	Colorado Rapids	Loan
July 15, 2019	(Honduras) César Romero	(United States) Colorado Springs Switchbacks	Colorado Rapids	Loan
July 15, 2019	(Canada) Jordan Schweitzer	(United States) Colorado Springs Switchbacks	Colorado Rapids	Loan
July 15, 2019	(Ghana) Ibrahim Yaro	(United States) Colorado Springs Switchbacks	Colorado Rapids	Loan
July 16, 2019	(Finland) Robin Lod	(Spain) Sporting de Gijón	Minnesota United FC	Transfer
July 17, 2019	(England) Mo Adams	Chicago Fire	Atlanta United FC	Trade
July 18, 2019	(Canada) Jason Beaulieu	Montreal Impact	(Canada) Ottawa Fury	Loan
July 18, 2019	(Colombia) Dan Bedoya	New York City	(United States) Hartford Athletic	Loan
July 18, 2019	(United States) Cameron Duke	(United States) Sporting Kansas City Academy	Sporting Kansas City	Homegrown player
July 19, 2019	(United States) Joe Bendik	Columbus Crew	Philadelphia Union	Trade
July 19, 2019	(Morocco) Youness Mokhtar	(Norway) Stabæk	Columbus Crew	Free
July 20, 2019	(Colombia) Carlos Rivas	New York Red Bulls	(Israel) Hapoel Ra'anana	Free
July 22, 2019	(United States) Jonathan Bornstein	(Israel) Maccabi Netanya	Chicago Fire	Free
July 22, 2019	(Argentina) Tomás Conechny	(Argentina) San Lorenzo	Portland Timbers	Transfer
July 23, 2019	(Scotland) Chris Cadden	(Scotland) Motherwell	Columbus Crew	Free
July 23, 2019	(Scotland) Chris Cadden	Columbus Crew	(England) Oxford United	Loan
July 23, 2019	(France) Wilfried Moimbé	(France) Nancy	Minnesota United FC	Free
July 24, 2019	(Germany) Gordon Wild	Atlanta United FC	D.C. United	Free
July 25, 2019	(Finland) Lassi Lappalainen	(Italy) Bologna	Montreal Impact	Loan
July 25, 2019	(United States) Forrest Lasso	FC Cincinnati	(United States) Nashville SC	Loan
July 26, 2019	(Argentina) Julián Carranza	(Argentina) Banfield	Inter Miami CF	Transfer
July 26, 2019	(Argentina) Julián Carranza	Inter Miami CF	(Argentina) Banfield	Loan
July 26, 2019	(Argentina) Matías Pellegrini	(Argentina) Estudiantes	Inter Miami CF	Transfer
July 26, 2019	(Argentina) Matías Pellegrini	Inter Miami CF	(Argentina) Estudiantes	Loan
July 28, 2019	(Chile) Pablo Aránguiz	FC Dallas	(Chile) Unión Española	Loan
July 29, 2019	(United States) Terrence Boyd	Toronto FC	(Germany) Hallescher FC	Free
July 29, 2019	(United States) Eric Miller	Minnesota United FC	New York City	Trade
July 29, 2019	(Colombia) Eddie Segura	(Colombia) Atlético Huila	Los Angeles FC	Transfer
July 30, 2019	(France) Nicolas Benezet	(France) Guingamp	Toronto FC	Loan
July 30, 2019	(Uruguay) Mauricio Pereyra	(Russia) Krasnodar	Orlando City SC	Free
July 30, 2019	(Argentina) Andrés Ríos	(Brazil) Vasco da Gama	San Jose Earthquakes	Transfer
July 30, 2019	(United States) Akeem Ward	D.C. United	(United States) Birmingham Legion	Free
July 31, 2019	(United States) Jimmy Ockford	San Jose Earthquakes	(United States) Nashville SC	Loan
July 31, 2019	(Australia) Brad Smith	(England) AFC Bournemouth	Seattle Sounders FC	Loan
August 1, 2019	(Portugal) Luís Martins	(Portugal) Chaves	Sporting Kansas City	Transfer
August 1, 2019	(United States) Chituru Odunze	(Canada) Vancouver Whitecaps Academy	Vancouver Whitecaps FC	Homegrown player
August 1, 2019	(United States) Chituru Odunze	Vancouver Whitecaps FC	(England) Leicester City	Transfer
August 1, 2019	(United States) Justin Rennicks	New England Revolution	(United States) North Carolina FC	Loan
August 2, 2019	(United States) Isaac Angking	New England Revolution	(United States) Charlotte Independence	Loan
August 2, 2019	(United States) Marcus Epps	New York Red Bulls	(United States) Memphis 901	Loan
August 3, 2019	(United States) Rece Buckmaster	(United States) New York Red Bulls II	New York Red Bulls	Transfer
August 3, 2019	(United States) Andrew Gutman	(Scotland) Celtic	FC Cincinnati	Loan
August 4, 2019	(Guyana) Emery Welshman	FC Cincinnati	(Israel) Hapoel Haifa	Free
August 5, 2019	(United States) Pierre da Silva	Orlando City SC	(United States) Memphis 901	Free
August 6, 2019	(Honduras) Michaell Chirinos	(Honduras) Olimpia	Vancouver Whitecaps FC	Loan
August 6, 2019	(Brazil) Felipe	Vancouver Whitecaps FC	D.C. United	Trade
August 6, 2019	(United States) Logan Gdula	FC Cincinnati	(United States) Hartford Athletic	Loan
August 6, 2019	(United States) Collin Martin	Minnesota United FC	(United States) Hartford Athletic	Loan
August 6, 2019	(United States) Bobby Shuttleworth	Minnesota United FC	(United States) Sacramento Republic	Loan
August 6, 2019	(Brazil) Lucas Venuto	Vancouver Whitecaps FC	(Brazil) Santos	Free
August 7, 2019	(Uganda) Micheal Azira	Montreal Impact	Chicago Fire	Trade
August 7, 2019	(Ghana) Emmanuel Boateng	LA Galaxy	D.C. United	Trade
August 7, 2019	(Uruguay) Thomás Chacón	(Uruguay) Danubio	Minnesota United FC	Transfer
August 7, 2019	(Cuba) Jorge Corrales	Chicago Fire	Montreal Impact	Trade
August 7, 2019	(Norway) Ola Kamara	(China) Shenzhen	D.C. United	Transfer
August 7, 2019	(Spain) Bojan Krkić	(England) Stoke City	Montreal Impact	Free
August 7, 2019	(United States) Brendan McDonough	Vancouver Whitecaps FC	(United States) Charlotte Independence	Loan
August 7, 2019	(United States) Christian Ramirez	Los Angeles FC	Houston Dynamo	Trade
August 7, 2019	(Uruguay) Brian Rodríguez	(Uruguay) Peñarol	Los Angeles FC	Transfer
August 7, 2019	(United States) Kelyn Rowe	Sporting Kansas City	Real Salt Lake	Trade
August 7, 2019	(Argentina) Gastón Sauro	Columbus Crew	(Mexico) Toluca	Transfer
August 7, 2019	(England) Josh Sims	(England) Southampton	New York Red Bulls	Loan
August 7, 2019	(Canada) Ballou Tabla	(Spain) Barcelona B	Montreal Impact	Loan
August 7, 2019	(Cameroon) Tony Tchani	Chicago Fire	(Canada) FC Edmonton	Free
August 8, 2019	(Argentina) Emanuel Cecchini	(Spain) Málaga	Seattle Sounders FC	Loan
August 8, 2019	(Haiti) Derrick Etienne	New York Red Bulls	FC Cincinnati	Loan
August 8, 2019	(United States) Joe Gyau	(Germany) MSV Duisburg	FC Cincinnati	Transfer
August 8, 2019	(Denmark) Niko Hansen	Columbus Crew	Houston Dynamo	Trade
August 8, 2019	(Argentina) Cristian Pavón	(Argentina) Boca Juniors	LA Galaxy	Loan
August 8, 2019	(Mexico) Luis Silva	(Finland) Honka	Seattle Sounders FC	Transfer
August 9, 2019	(United States) Eric Alexander	FC Cincinnati	FC Dallas	Free
August 9, 2019	(Canada) Tosaint Ricketts	(Lithuania) Sūduva	Vancouver Whitecaps FC	Transfer
August 12, 2019	(Ecuador) Diego Palacios	(Ecuador) Aucas	Los Angeles FC	Transfer
August 12, 2019	(United States) Henry Wingo	Seattle Sounders FC	(Norway) Molde	Transfer
August 13, 2019	(Sweden) Johan Blomberg	Colorado Rapids	(Sweden) GIF Sundsvall	Loan
August 14, 2019	(France) Zakaria Diallo	Montreal Impact	(France) Lens	Transfer
August 14, 2019	(United States) Colton Storm	Sporting Kansas City	(United States) North Carolina FC	Free
August 15, 2019	(Canada) Dejan Jaković	Los Angeles FC	(United States) Las Vegas Lights	Loan
August 15, 2019	(Jamaica) Peter-Lee Vassell	Los Angeles FC	(United States) Phoenix Rising	Loan
August 15, 2019	(El Salvador) Rodolfo Zelaya	Los Angeles FC	(United States) Las Vegas Lights	Loan
August 17, 2019	(United States) Cody Cropper	New England Revolution	(United States) Hartford Athletic	Loan
August 21, 2019	(Brazil) Luiz Fernando	(United States) Atlanta United 2	Atlanta United FC	Transfer
August 21, 2019	(Hungary) Zoltán Stieber	D.C. United	(Hungary) Zalaegerszeg	Free
August 23, 2019	(United States) Sebastian Anderson	Colorado Rapids	(United States) Colorado Springs Switchbacks	Loan
August 23, 2019	(United States) Cole Bassett	Colorado Rapids	(United States) Colorado Springs Switchbacks	Loan
August 23, 2019	(Panama) Cristian Martínez	Chicago Fire	(United States) Las Vegas Lights	Loan
August 23, 2019	(Canada) Georges Mukumbilwa	(Canada) Vancouver Whitecaps Academy	Vancouver Whitecaps FC	Homegrown player
August 30, 2019	(United States) Chris Durkin	D.C. United	(Belgium) Sint-Truiden	Loan
August 30, 2019	(United States) Felipe Hernández	(United States) Swope Park Rangers	Sporting Kansas City	Homegrown player
August 31, 2019	(Honduras) Douglas Martínez	(United States) Real Monarchs	Real Salt Lake	Transfer
September 3, 2019	(Canada) David Norman Jr.	Vancouver Whitecaps FC	(Canada) Pacific FC	Loan
September 4, 2019	(Jamaica) Cory Burke	Philadelphia Union	(Jamaica) Portmore United	Loan
September 6, 2019	(United States) Nick Hinds	(United States) Tacoma Defiance	Seattle Sounders FC	Short-Term Agreement
September 6, 2019	(United States) Shandon Hopeau	(United States) Tacoma Defiance	Seattle Sounders FC	Short-Term Agreement
