= 2019 Vancouver Whitecaps FC season =

Vancouver Whitecaps FC 2019 soccer season

Vancouver Whitecaps FC
- Chairman: John Furlong
- Head coach: Marc Dos Santos
- Stadium: BC Place (Capacity: 22,120)
- Major League Soccer: Conference: 12th Overall: 23rd
- MLS Cup Playoffs: Did not qualify
- Canadian Championship: 3rd qualifying round
- Top goalscorer: League: Fredy Montero (8); All: Fredy Montero (8)
- Highest home attendance: League/all: 27,837; March 2 vs. Minnesota United FC
- Lowest home attendance: League: 16,138; May 15 v Atlanta United FC; All: 16,089; July 24 vs. Cavalry FC
- Average home league attendance: 19,514
| Home colours | Away colours |

The 2019 Vancouver Whitecaps FC season was the club's ninth season in Major League Soccer, the top division of soccer in the United States and Canada. Including previous iterations of the franchise, this was 42nd season of professional soccer played in Vancouver under a variation of the "Whitecaps" name.

On November 7, 2018, the Whitecaps named Marc Dos Santos as their fourth head coach since joining MLS.

Outside of the MLS, the Whitecaps participated in the 2019 Canadian Championship. They lost 2–1 on aggregate to Cavalry FC in the third round.

== Roster ==
As of September 3, 2019

| No. | Player | Nationality | Position | Date of birth (age) | Previous club |
Goalkeepers
| 16 | Maxime Crépeau | (Canada) | GK | April 11, 1994 (age 32) | (Canada) Montreal Impact |
| 18 | Zac MacMath | (United States) | GK | August 7, 1991 (age 35) | (United States) Colorado Rapids |
| 39 | Sean Melvin | (Canada) | GK | July 9, 1994 (age 32) | (United States) Fresno FC |
| 51 | Thomas Hasal | (Canada) | GK | July 9, 1999 (age 27) | (Canada) Vancouver Whitecaps FC U-23 |
Defenders
| 2 | Doneil Henry | (Canada) | DF | April 20, 1993 (age 33) | (England) West Ham United |
| 13 | Derek Cornelius | (Canada) | DF | November 25, 1997 (age 28) | (Serbia) Javor Ivanjica |
| 20 | Jasser Khmiri | (Tunisia) | DF | July 27, 1997 (age 29) | (Tunisia) Stade Tunisien |
| 22 | Érik Godoy | (Argentina) | DF | August 16, 1993 (age 33) | (Argentina) Colón |
| 23 | Scott Sutter | (Switzerland) | DF | May 13, 1986 (age 40) | (United States) Orlando City SC |
| 26 | Brendan McDonough (on loan at Charlotte Independence.) | (United States) | DF | December 27, 1996 (age 29) | (United States) Georgetown Hoyas |
| 28 | Jake Nerwinski | (United States) | DF | October 17, 1994 (age 32) | (United States) Connecticut Huskies |
| 46 | Brett Levis | (Canada) | DF | May 29, 1993 (age 33) | (Canada) Whitecaps FC 2 |
| 53 | Ali Adnan | (Iraq) | DF | December 19, 1993 (age 32) | (Italy) Udinese |
| 56 | Georges Mukumbilwa | (Canada) | DF | September 23, 1999 (age 27) | (Canada) Vancouver Whitecaps FC Residency |
| 94 | Victor "PC" Giro | (Brazil) | DF | March 10, 1994 (age 32) | (United States) Orlando City SC |
Midfielders
| 4 | Hwang In-beom | (South Korea) | MF | September 20, 1996 (age 30) | (South Korea) Daejeon Citizen |
| 6 | Jon Erice | (Spain) | MF | November 3, 1986 (age 40) | (Spain) Albacete |
| 15 | Andy Rose | (England) | MF | February 13, 1990 (age 36) | (Scotland) Motherwell |
| 19 | Lass Bangoura | (Guinea) | MF | March 30, 1992 (age 34) | (Spain) Rayo Vallecano |
| 24 | David Norman Jr. (on loan at Pacific FC.) | (Canada) | MF | May 31, 1998 (age 28) | (Canada) Whitecaps FC 2 |
| 29 | Yordy Reyna | (Peru) | MF | September 16, 1993 (age 33) | (Austria) Red Bull Salzburg |
| 31 | Russell Teibert | (Canada) | MF | December 22, 1992 (age 33) | (Canada) Vancouver Whitecaps (USSF-D2) |
| 33 | Michaell Chirinos | (Honduras) | MF | June 17, 1995 (age 31) | (Honduras) Olimpia |
| 54 | Simon Colyn | (Canada) | MF | March 23, 2002 (age 24) | (Canada) Vancouver Whitecaps FC Residency |
| 55 | Michael Baldisimo | (Canada) | MF | April 13, 2000 (age 26) | (Canada) Vancouver Whitecaps FC Residency |
Forwards
| – | Anthony Blondell (on loan at Huachipato.) | (Venezuela) | FW | May 17, 1994 (age 32) | (Venezuela) Monagas SC |
| 9 | Joaquín Ardaiz | (Uruguay) | FW | January 11, 1999 (age 27) | (Switzerland) Chiasso |
| 12 | Fredy Montero | (Colombia) | FW | July 26, 1987 (age 39) | (Portugal) Sporting CP |
| 50 | Theo Bair | (Canada) | FW | August 27, 1999 (age 27) | (Canada) Vancouver Whitecaps FC Residency |
| 87 | Tosaint Ricketts | (Canada) | FW | August 6, 1987 (age 39) | (Lithuania) Sūduva |

=== Transfers ===
==== In ====
| No. | Pos. | Player | Transferred from | Fee/notes | Date | Ref. |
|---|---|---|---|---|---|---|
| | FW | (New Zealand) Myer Bevan | (United States) Fresno FC | Loan Return | November 26, 2018 | |
| | GK | (United States) Spencer Richey | (United States) FC Cincinnati | Loan Return | November 26, 2018 | |
| 94 | DF | (Brazil) Victor "PC" Giro | (United States) Orlando City SC | Acquired in exchange for 3rd round pick in MLS SuperDraft | December 9, 2018 | |
| 18 | GK | (United States) Zac MacMath | (United States) Colorado Rapids | Acquired in exchange for $100,000 in TAM and Nicolas Mezquida | December 9, 2018 | |
| 16 | GK | (Canada) Maxime Crépeau | (Canada) Montreal Impact | Acquired in exchange for $50,000 in TAM and a 3rd round pick in MLS SuperDraft | December 9, 2018 | |
| 15 | MF | (England) Andy Rose | (Scotland) Motherwell | MLS rights acquired from Seattle Sounders FC in exchange for $50,000 in GAM | December 9, 2018 | |
| 24 | MF | (Canada) David Norman Jr. | (Scotland) Queen of the South | Loan Return | December 31, 2018 | |
| 13 | DF | (Canada) Derek Cornelius | (Serbia) Javor Ivanjica | Undisclosed | January 18, 2019 | |
| 6 | MF | (Spain) Jon Erice | (Spain) Albacete | Undisclosed | January 22, 2019 | |
| 19 | MF | (Guinea) Lass Bangoura | (Spain) Rayo Vallecano | One year Loan, Option to buy | January 23, 2019 | |
| 7 | MF | (Brazil) Lucas Venuto | Austria Wien | Undisclosed Fee, MLS first right of refusal acquired from New York City FC for $150,000 GAM | January 25, 2019 | |
| 23 | DF | (Switzerland) Scott Sutter | (United States) Orlando City SC | Free | January 30, 2019 | |
| 4 | MF | (South Korea) Hwang In-beom | (South Korea) Daejeon Citizen | Undisclosed, Designated Player | January 30, 2019 | |
| 20 | DF | (Tunisia) Jasser Khmiri | (Tunisia) Stade Tunisien | Undisclosed | February 1, 2019 | |
| 22 | DF | (Argentina) Érik Godoy | (Argentina) Colón | One year Loan, Option to buy | February 8, 2019 | |
| 9 | FW | (Uruguay) Joaquín Ardaiz | (Switzerland) Chiasso | One year Loan, Option to buy | February 8, 2019 | |
| 12 | FW | (Colombia) Fredy Montero | (Portugal) Sporting CP | Free | February 15, 2019 | |
| 26 | DF | (United States) Brendan McDonough | (United States) Georgetown Hoyas | 2019 MLS SuperDraft | March 6, 2019 | |
| 51 | GK | (Canada) Thomas Hasal | (Canada) Vancouver Whitecaps FC U-23 | Homegrown player | March 7, 2019 | |
| 53 | DF | (Iraq) Ali Adnan | (Italy) Udinese | Loan | March 9, 2019 | |
| 53 | DF | (Iraq) Ali Adnan | (Italy) Udinese | Undisclosed, Designated Player | July 5, 2019 | |
| | GK | (United States) Chituru Odunze | (Canada) Vancouver Whitecaps FC Residency | Homegrown player | August 1, 2019 | |
| 33 | MF | (Honduras) Michaell Chirinos | (Honduras) Olimpia | Loan, Option to buy | August 6, 2019 | |
| 87 | FW | (Canada) Tosaint Ricketts | (Lithuania) Sūduva | Free | August 9, 2019 | |
| 56 | DF | (Canada) Georges Mukumbilwa | (Canada) Vancouver Whitecaps FC Residency | Homegrown player | August 23, 2019 | |

==== Out ====
| Pos. | Player | Transferred to | Fee/notes | Date | Ref. |
|---|---|---|---|---|---|
| MF | (England) Jordon Mutch | (England) Crystal Palace | Loan Return | November 26, 2018 | |
| DF | (Uruguay) José Aja | (Chile) Unión Española | Option Declined | November 26, 2018 | |
| FW | (New Zealand) Myer Bevan | (New Zealand) Western Springs AFC | Option Declined | November 26, 2018 | |
| DF | (El Salvador) Roberto Domínguez | (El Salvador) FAS | Option Declined | November 26, 2018 | |
| FW | (Netherlands) Marvin Emnes | | Option Declined | November 26, 2018 | |
| MF | (Egypt) Ali Ghazal | (Portugal) C.D. Feirense | Option Declined | November 26, 2018 | |
| GK | (New Zealand) Stefan Marinovic | (England) Bristol City F.C. | Option Declined | November 26, 2018 | |
| DF | (United States) Aaron Maund | (United States) Charlotte Independence | Option Declined | November 26, 2018 | |
| GK | (United States) Spencer Richey (Note: After his option was declined, Richey's rights were traded to FC Cincinnati in exchange for a third-round pick in 2020.) | | Option Declined | November 26, 2018 | |
| MF | (United States) Brek Shea (Note: After his option was declined, Shea signed with Atlanta United FC.) | (United States) Atlanta United FC | Option Declined | November 26, 2018 | |
| DF | (United States) Sean Franklin | | Out of Contract | November 26, 2018 | |
| FW | (Sierra Leone) Kei Kamara (Note: Kamara was selected by FC Cincinnati in the Expansion Draft and subsequently traded to the Colorado Rapids.) | | Out of Contract | November 26, 2018 | |
| GK | (United States) Brian Rowe | (United States) Orlando City SC | Out of Contract | November 26, 2018 | |
| MF | (Uruguay) Cristian Techera | (Argentina) Belgrano | Out of Contract | November 26, 2018 | |
| MF | (Uruguay) Nicolás Mezquida | (United States) Colorado Rapids | Traded along with $100,000 in TAM in exchange for Zac MacMath | December 9, 2018 | |
| DF | (Costa Rica) Kendall Waston | (United States) FC Cincinnati | Traded in exchange for $450,000 in GAM, $300,000 in TAM and an international roster spot | December 11, 2018 | |
| FW | (United States) Erik Hurtado | (United States) Sporting Kansas City | Traded in exchange for a second round pick in the 2020 MLS SuperDraft and a first round pick in the 2021 MLS SuperDraft | December 14, 2018 | |
| MF | (Canada) Alphonso Davies | (Germany) Bayern Munich | Undisclosed fee | January 1, 2019 | |
| FW | (Venezuela) Anthony Blondell | (Chile) Huachipato | One year loan, Option to buy | January 28, 2019 | |
| MF | (Mexico) Efraín Juárez | (Norway) Valerenga | Mutual Contract Termination | February 1, 2019 | |
| DF | (Canada) Marcel de Jong | (Canada) Pacific FC | Mutual Contract Termination | February 4, 2019 | |
| MF | (Iraq) Ali Adnan | (Italy) Udinese | Loan Return | June 30, 2019 | |
| GK | (United States) Chituru Odunze | (England) Leicester City | Undisclosed | August 1, 2019 | |
| MF | (Brazil) Lucas Venuto | | Mutual contract termination | August 1, 2019 | |
| MF | (Brazil) Felipe | (United States) D.C. United | Traded in exchange for $75,000 in TAM and an international roster spot | August 6, 2019 | |
| DF | (United States) Brendan McDonough | (United States) Charlotte Independence | Loan | August 7, 2019 | |
| MF | (Canada) David Norman Jr. | (Canada) Pacific FC | Loan | September 3, 2019 | |

== Major League Soccer ==
=== Preseason ===
| February 8, 2019 | Whitecaps FC | 1–3 | V-Varen Nagasaki | Honolulu, Hawaii |
| 22:15 (PST) | Norman Jr. 81' | Report | Hasegawa 44'; Otake 47', 49' | Stadium: Aloha Stadium |

| February 10, 2019 | Whitecaps FC | 0–1 | Iwaki FC | Honolulu, Hawaii |
| 16:30 (PST) | | Report | Vasquez 87' (pen.) | Stadium: Aloha Stadium |

| February 16, 2019 | LA Galaxy | 0–0 | Whitecaps FC | Carson, California |
| 17:00 (PST) | | Report | | Stadium: Dignity Health Sports Park |

| February 20, 2019 | Tijuana | 1–1 | Whitecaps FC | Carson, California |
| 13:00 (PST) | 66' | Report | PC 84' | Stadium: Dignity Health Sports Park |

| February 23, 2019 | LAFC | 1–0 | Whitecaps FC | Los Angeles, California |
| 17:30 (PST) | Vela 13' | Report | | Stadium: Banc of California Stadium |

=== Regular season ===
==== League tables ====
===== Western Conference =====
2019 MLS Western Conference standings
| Pos | Team | Pld | W | L | T | GF | GA | GD | Pts |
|---|---|---|---|---|---|---|---|---|---|
| 8 | San Jose Earthquakes | 34 | 13 | 16 | 5 | 51 | 52 | −1 | 44 |
| 9 | Colorado Rapids | 34 | 12 | 16 | 6 | 57 | 60 | −3 | 42 |
| 10 | Houston Dynamo | 34 | 12 | 18 | 4 | 45 | 57 | −12 | 40 |
| 11 | Sporting Kansas City | 34 | 10 | 16 | 8 | 49 | 67 | −18 | 38 |
| 12 | Vancouver Whitecaps FC | 34 | 8 | 16 | 10 | 37 | 58 | −21 | 34 |

Source: MLS
Rules for classification: 1) points; 2) total wins; 3) total goal differential; 4) total goals scored; 5) disciplinary points; 6) away goal differential; 7) away goals scored; 8) home goals scored; 9) home goal differential; 10) coin toss or drawing of lots

===== Overall =====
2019 MLS regular season standings
| Pos | Team | Pld | W | L | T | GF | GA | GD | Pts |
|---|---|---|---|---|---|---|---|---|---|
| 20 | Columbus Crew SC | 34 | 10 | 16 | 8 | 39 | 47 | −8 | 38 |
| 21 | Sporting Kansas City | 34 | 10 | 16 | 8 | 49 | 67 | −18 | 38 |
| 22 | Orlando City SC | 34 | 9 | 15 | 10 | 44 | 52 | −8 | 37 |
| 23 | Vancouver Whitecaps FC | 34 | 8 | 16 | 10 | 37 | 59 | −22 | 34 |
| 24 | FC Cincinnati | 34 | 6 | 22 | 6 | 31 | 75 | −44 | 24 |

Source: MLS
Rules for classification: 1) points; 2) total wins; 3) total goal differential; 4) total goals scored; 5) disciplinary points; 6) away goals scored; 7) away goal differential; 8) coin toss or drawing of lots

==== Results ====
| Overall | | | | | | | | Home | | | | | | Away | | | | | |
| Pld | Pts | W | L | D | GF | GA | GD | W | L | D | GF | GA | GD | W | L | D | GF | GA | GD |
|---|---|---|---|---|---|---|---|---|---|---|---|---|---|---|---|---|---|---|---|
| 34 | 34 | 8 | 16 | 10 | 37 | 59 | −22 | 5 | 7 | 5 | 16 | 23 | −7 | 3 | 9 | 5 | 21 | 36 | −15 |

Last updated: October 6, 2019
Pld = Matches played; Pts = Points; W = Matches won; T = Matches tied; L = Matches lost; GF = Goals for; GA = Goals against; GD = Goal difference

| Round | 1 | 2 | 3 | 4 | 5 | 6 | 7 | 8 | 9 | 10 | 11 | 12 | 13 | 14 | 15 | 16 | 17 | 18 | 19 | 20 | 21 | 22 | 23 | 24 | 25 | 26 | 27 | 28 | 29 | 30 | 31 | 32 | 33 | 34 |
|---|---|---|---|---|---|---|---|---|---|---|---|---|---|---|---|---|---|---|---|---|---|---|---|---|---|---|---|---|---|---|---|---|---|---|
| Ground | H | A | A | H | H | A | H | A | H | A | H | H | A | A | H | H | H | A | A | A | H | A | H | A | A | A | H | A | A | H | H | H | A | H |
| Result | L | L | L | D | L | D | W | L | D | W | W | L | D | D | W | D | D | D | L | L | L | L | L | D | W | L | W | L | L | L | W | D | W | L |

Updated to match(es) played on August 3, 2019. Source:
A = Away; H = Home; W = Win; D = Draw; L = Loss

==== Matches ====
| March 2, 2019 1 | Whitecaps FC | 2–3 | Minnesota United FC | Vancouver, British Columbia |
| 15:00 (PST) | Godoy 6'; Erice (yellow card) 31'; Cornelius (yellow card) 45'; Henry 81' | Report | Alonso (yellow card) 24'; Quintero 37' (pen.); Ibarra (yellow card) 45+2' (goal) 70'; Calvo 66' (yellow card) 79' | Stadium: BC Place; Attendance: 27,837; Referee: Rubiel Vazquez |

| March 9, 2019 2 | Real Salt Lake | 1–0 | Whitecaps FC | Sandy, Utah |
| 15:00 (PST) | Rusnák 21' (pen.); Luiz (yellow card) 41' | Report | Reyna (yellow card) 17' | Stadium: Rio Tinto Stadium; Attendance: 17,096; Referee: Drew Fischer |

| March 16, 2019 3 | Houston Dynamo | 3–2 | Whitecaps FC | Houston, Texas |
| 12:00 (PDT) | Rodríguez 19', (yellow card) 49', (goal) 73'; Elis 42' (pen.); Quioto (yellow card) 83'; Manotas (yellow card) 90' | Report | Montero 35' (pen.); Lass 54'; PC (yellow card) 82' | Stadium: BBVA Compass Stadium; Attendance: 13,549; Referee: Nima Saghafi |

| March 30, 2019 4 | Whitecaps FC | 0–0 | Seattle Sounders FC | Vancouver, British Columbia |
| 19:00 (PDT) | Felipe (yellow card) 90+1' | Report | | Stadium: BC Place; Attendance: 24,803; Referee: Robert Sibiga |

| April 5, 2019 5 | Whitecaps FC | 0–2 | LA Galaxy | Vancouver, British Columbia |
| 19:00 (PDT) | Montero (yellow card) 86'; Felipe (yellow card) 90' | Report | dos Santos (yellow card) 16'; Alessandrini (yellow card) 44'; Steres 63'; Ibrahimovic 71' | Stadium: BC Place; Attendance: 22,120; Referee: Baldomero Toledo |

| April 12, 2019 6 | Chicago Fire | 1–1 | Whitecaps FC | Bridgeview, Illinois |
| 17:30 (PDT) | Adams (yellow card) 40'; Nikolić 84' (pen.) | Report | Reyna 53'; Crépeau (yellow card) 79' | Stadium: SeatGeek Stadium; Attendance: 10,439; Referee: Jair Marrufo |

| April 17, 2019 7 | Whitecaps FC | 1–0 | Los Angeles FC | Vancouver, British Columbia |
| 19:00 (PDT) | Henry (yellow card) 19'; Hwang 27', (yellow card) 72'; PC (yellow card) 39' | Report | Danilo Silva (yellow card) 53'; El-Munir (yellow card) 80' | Stadium: BC Place; Attendance: 17,038; Referee: Ramy Touchan |

| April 20, 2019 8 | Orlando City SC | 1–0 | Whitecaps FC | Orlando, Florida |
| 12:00 (PDT) | Nani (yellow card) 62' (goal) 88' | Report | Cornelius (yellow card) 90'; Bangoura (yellow card) 90+3' | Stadium: Orlando City Stadium; Attendance: 22,468; Referee: Alan Kelly |

| April 27, 2019 9 | Whitecaps FC | 1–1 | Philadelphia Union | Vancouver, British Columbia |
| 14:00 (PDT) | Henry 41'; Reyna (yellow card) 45'; Adnan (yellow card) 51'; PC (yellow card) 58' | Report | Bedoya (yellow card) 24'; Przybylko 66' | Stadium: BC Place; Attendance: 17,835; Referee: Chris Penso |

| May 3, 2019 10 | Colorado Rapids | 2–3 | Whitecaps FC | Commerce City, Colorado |
| 18:00 (PDT) | Kamara 38' (pen.), 53' (pen.); Rubio (red card) 77'; Acosta (yellow card) 89' | Report | Montero 16'; Venuto 26'; Rose 87' | Stadium: Dick's Sporting Goods Park; Attendance: 10,794; Referee: Alex Chilowicz |

| May 10, 2019 11 | Whitecaps FC | 1–0 | Portland Timbers | Vancouver, British Columbia |
| 19:00 (PDT) | Montero 9'; Godoy (yellow card) 61' | Report | Blanco (yellow card) 28'; Paredes (yellow card) 48'; Chara (yellow card) 90' | Stadium: BC Place; Attendance: 18,356; Referee: Allen Chapman |

| May 15, 2019 12 | Whitecaps FC | 0–1 | Atlanta United FC | Vancouver, British Columbia |
| 19:00 (PDT) | Adnan (yellow card) 39'; Ardaiz (yellow card) 80' | Report | Escobar (yellow card) 13'; Martínez 29' (pen.); Remedi (yellow card) 86' | Stadium: BC Place; Attendance: 16,138; Referee: Baldomero Toledo |

| May 18, 2019 13 | Sporting Kansas City | 1–1 | Whitecaps FC | Kansas City, Kansas |
| 17:30 (PDT) | Németh 37' (red card) 51'; Rowe (yellow card) 62'; Melia (yellow card) 87' | Report | Felipe (yellow card) 8'; Hwang (yellow card) 56'; Cornelius 90+4'; Venuto (yellow card) 90+5' | Stadium: Children's Mercy Park; Attendance: 18,691; Referee: Tim Ford |

| May 22, 2019 14 | New York Red Bulls | 2–2 | Whitecaps FC | Harrison, New Jersey |
| 17:00 (PDT) | Nealis (yellow card) 8'; White 37'; Rose 55' (o.g.) | Report | Sutter 29'; Montero 61' (pen.); Cornelius (yellow card) 87'; MacMath (yellow card) 90+2' | Stadium: Red Bull Arena; Attendance: 13,035; Referee: Victor Rivas |

| May 25, 2019 15 | Whitecaps FC | 2–1 | FC Dallas | Vancouver, British Columbia |
| 16:00 (PDT) | Adnan 30'; Venuto 40'; Felipe (yellow card) 90+2' | Report | Cannon (yellow card) 60'; Badji 85' | Stadium: BC Place; Attendance: 18,309; Referee: Alex Chilowicz |

| May 31, 2019 16 | Whitecaps FC | 1–1 | Toronto FC | Vancouver, British Columbia |
| 19:00 (PDT) | Montero 84' (pen.) | Report | Moor (yellow card) 45+1'; DeLeon 90' | Stadium: BC Place; Attendance: 21,083; Referee: Jair Marrufo |

| June 22, 2019 17 | Whitecaps FC | 2–2 | Colorado Rapids | Vancouver, British Columbia |
| 19:00 (PDT) | Montero 45+1' (pen.); Erice (yellow card) 61'; Reyna 80' | Report | Rubio 8'; Shinyashiki 20' (yellow card) 54'; Kamara (yellow card) 27'; Acosta (yellow card) 90+1'; Abubakar (yellow card) 90+5' | Stadium: BC Place; Attendance: 19,893; Referee: Fotis Bazakos |

| June 26, 2019 18 | FC Dallas | 2–2 | Whitecaps FC | Frisco, Texas |
| 18:00 (PDT) | Ziegler (yellow card) 44'; Hedges (yellow card) 45+3'; Ferreira 55'; Hollingshead 59'; Cerrillo (yellow card) 85' | Report | Rose (yellow card) 41'; Reyna 81'; Levis (yellow card) 89'; Venuto 90+4' (yellow card) 90+4'; Adnan (yellow card) 90+7' | Stadium: Toyota Stadium; Attendance: 11,911; Referee: Silviu Petrescu |

| June 29, 2019 19 | Seattle Sounders FC | 1–0 | Whitecaps FC | Seattle, Washington |
| 19:00 (PDT) | Leerdam 90+6' | Report | Reyna (yellow card) 66'; Venuto (yellow card) 90+2' | Stadium: CenturyLink Field; Attendance: 44,489; Referee: Alan Kelly |

| July 6, 2019 20 | Los Angeles FC | 6–1 | Whitecaps FC | Los Angeles, California |
| 19:30 (PDT) | Rose 35' (o.g.); Diomande 41'; Kaye 46'; Vela 54', 70'; Rossi 72'; Atuesta (yellow card) 80' | Report | Reyna 5' (yellow card) 48'; Godoy (yellow card) 7'; Montero (red card) 85' | Stadium: Banc of California Stadium; Attendance: 22,472; Referee: Allen Chapman |

| July 13, 2019 21 | Whitecaps FC | 0–3 | Sporting Kansas City | Vancouver, British Columbia |
| 19:00 (PDT) | PC (yellow card) 48'; Henry (yellow card) 81'; Godoy (yellow card) 90'; Adnan (yellow card) 90+4' | Report | Adnan 24' (o.g.); Gutiérrez 56'; Sánchez (yellow card) 68'; Sinovic (yellow card) 75'; Gerso 90' | Stadium: BC Place; Attendance: 18,700; Referee: Ramy Touchan |

| July 17, 2019 22 | New England Revolution | 4–0 | Whitecaps FC | Foxborough, Massachusetts |
| 16:00 (PDT) | Bou 45+1'; Caicedo (yellow card) 71'; Farrell (yellow card) 77'; Fagundez 82'; Gil 86'; Bunbury 90' | Report | Godoy (yellow card) 49'; Cornelius (yellow card) 58' | Stadium: Gillette Stadium; Attendance: 10,575; Referee: Robert Sibiga |

| July 20, 2019 23 | Whitecaps FC | 1–3 | San Jose Earthquakes | Vancouver, British Columbia |
| 19:00 (PDT) | Henry 7'; Reyna (yellow card) 84'; Bair (yellow card) 90+1' | Report | Qazaishvili 16'; Judson (yellow card) 32'; Wondolowski 34'; Lima (yellow card) 71'; Eriksson 79'; Marie (yellow card) 90+4' | Stadium: BC Place; Attendance: 17,558; Referee: Silviu Petrescu |

| July 27, 2019 24 | Minnesota United FC | 0–0 | Whitecaps FC | Saint Paul, Minnesota |
| 17:00 (PDT) | Finlay (yellow card) 35'; Quintero (yellow card) 67' | Report | Felipe (yellow card) 37'; Hwang (yellow card) 57' | Stadium: Allianz Field; Attendance: 19,845; Referee: Armando Villarreal |

| August 3, 2019 25 | FC Cincinnati | 1–2 | Whitecaps FC | Cincinnati, Ohio |
| 17:00 (PDT) | Cruz 6'; Bertone (yellow card) 90+2' | Report | Hwang 41'; Felipe 84' | Stadium: Nippert Stadium; Attendance: 27,106; Referee: Rosendo Mendoza |

| August 10, 2019 26 | Portland Timbers | 3–1 | Whitecaps FC | Portland, Oregon |
| 20:00 (PDT) | Blanco 28'; Cascante (yellow card) 45+5'; Loría 55' (yellow card) 59'; Ebobisse 90' | Report | Bair 38'; Godoy (yellow card) 65'; Nerwinski (yellow card) 84' | Stadium: Providence Park; Attendance: 25,218; Referee: Ted Unkel |

| August 17, 2019 27 | Whitecaps FC | 1–0 | D.C. United | Vancouver, British Columbia |
| 19:00 (PDT) | Reyna 18'; Teibert (yellow card) 53'; Rose (yellow card) 69'; Crépeau (yellow card) 90+6'; Hwang (yellow card) 90+7' | Report | Rodríguez (yellow card) 14' | Stadium: BC Place; Attendance: 22,120; Referee: Timothy Ford |

| August 24, 2019 28 | San Jose Earthquakes | 3–1 | Whitecaps FC | San Jose, California |
| 19:00 (PDT) | Judson 7'; Jungwirth (yellow card) 31'; Wondolowski 34'; López (yellow card) 72'; Ríos 73' | Report | Nerwinski 6' | Stadium: Avaya Stadium; Attendance: 17,458; Referee: Ramy Touchan |

| August 28, 2019 29 | Montreal Impact | 2–1 | Whitecaps FC | Montreal, Quebec |
| 17:00 (PDT) | Henry 35' (o.g.); Urruti 37', (yellow card) 51' | Report | Reyna 17' | Stadium: Stade Saputo; Attendance: 14,513; Referee: Ismail Elfath |

| August 31, 2019 30 | Whitecaps FC | 1–3 | New York City FC | Vancouver, British Columbia |
| 19:00 (PDT) | Hwang (yellow card) 45+4'; Henry (yellow card) 49'; Reyna 64'; Chirinos (yellow card) 79' | Report | Héber 10'; Mackay-Steven 26'; Mitriță 72' (yellow card) 85' | Stadium: BC Place; Attendance: 17,512; Referee: Marcos de Oliveira |

| September 14, 2019 31 | Whitecaps FC | 2–1 | Houston Dynamo | Vancouver, British Columbia |
| 19:00 (PDT) | Adnan (yellow card) 30'; Hwang 54' (pen.) (yellow card) 66'; Montero 90' | Report | Vera (yellow card) 42'; Manotas 78' | Stadium: BC Place; Attendance: 17,382; Referee: Robert Sibiga |

| September 21, 2019 32 | Whitecaps FC | 1–1 | Columbus Crew SC | Vancouver, British Columbia |
| 14:00 (PDT) | MacMath (yellow card) 17'; Ricketts (yellow card) 35'; Adnan (yellow card) 45+1'; Montero 90+4' | Report | Zardes 18' (pen.) | Stadium: BC Place; Attendance: 16,683; Referee: Alex Chilowicz |

| September 29, 2019 33 | LA Galaxy | 3–4 | Whitecaps FC | Carson, California |
| 16:30 (PDT) | Ibrahimović 23'; Lletget (yellow card) 34'; Antuna 58'; Pontius 86' | Report | Henry 20'; Bair 41'; Ricketts 64'; Chirinos 90+2' | Stadium: Dignity Health Sports Park; Attendance: 25,903; Referee: Alan Kelly |

| October 6, 2019 34 | Whitecaps FC | 0–1 | Real Salt Lake | Vancouver, British Columbia |
| 13:00 (PDT) | Godoy (yellow card) 90'; Chirinos (yellow card) 90+2' | Report | Kreilach 28' | Stadium: BC Place; Attendance: 18,378; Referee: Ted Unkel |

== Canadian Championship ==
| July 10 3rd qualifying round | Cavalry FC | 0–0 | Whitecaps FC | Foothills County, Alberta |
| 18:30 (PDT) | Escalante (yellow card) 56'; Adekugbe (yellow card) 66'; Ledgerwood (yellow card) 71' | Report | Adnan (yellow card) 89' | Stadium: ATCO Field; Attendance: 5,129; Referee: Pierre-Luc Lauziere |

| July 24 3rd qualifying round | Whitecaps FC | 1–2 (1–2 agg.) | Cavalry FC | Vancouver, British Columbia |
| 19:30 (PDT) | Venuto (yellow card) 51'; Hwang 67' | Report | Mavila (yellow card) 5'; Brown 7'; Wheeldon (yellow card) 48'; Zator 72' | Stadium: BC Place; Attendance: 16,089; Referee: Alain Ruch |

== Playing statistics ==
As of October 6, 2019

Appearances (Apps.) numbers are for appearances in competitive games only including sub appearances
Red card numbers denote: Numbers in parentheses represent red cards overturned for wrongful dismissal.

| No. | Nat. | Player | Pos. | MLS | | | | Canadian Championship | | | | Total | | | |
| No. | Nat. | Player | Pos. | Apps | Goal | Yellow card | Red card | Apps | Goal | Yellow card | Red card | Apps | Goal | Yellow card | Red card |
|---|---|---|---|---|---|---|---|---|---|---|---|---|---|---|---|
| 2 | (Canada) | Doneil Henry | DF | 25 | 4 | 3 | | 2 | | | | 27 | 4 | 3 | |
| 4 | (South Korea) | Hwang In-beom | MF | 33 | 3 | 6 | | 1 | 1 | | | 34 | 4 | 6 | |
| 6 | (Spain) | Jon Erice | MF | 21 | | 2 | | | | | | 21 | | 2 | |
| 9 | (Uruguay) | Joaquín Ardaiz | FW | 16 | | 1 | | 2 | | | | 18 | | 1 | |
| 12 | (Colombia) | Fredy Montero | FW | 32 | 8 | 1 | 1 | 1 | | | | 33 | 8 | 1 | 1 |
| 13 | (Canada) | Derek Cornelius | DF | 17 | 1 | 4 | | 1 | | | | 18 | 1 | 4 | |
| 15 | (England) | Andy Rose | MF | 24 | 1 | 2 | | 2 | | | | 26 | 1 | 2 | |
| 16 | (Canada) | Maxime Crépeau | GK | 26 | | 2 | | 2 | | | | 28 | | 2 | |
| 18 | (United States) | Zac MacMath | GK | 8 | | 2 | | | | | | 8 | | 2 | |
| 19 | (Guinea) | Lass Bangoura | MF | 17 | 1 | 1 | | 1 | | | | 18 | 1 | 1 | |
| 20 | (Tunisia) | Jasser Khmiri | DF | 1 | | | | | | | | 1 | | | |
| 22 | (Argentina) | Érik Godoy | DF | 29 | 1 | 6 | | 2 | | | | 31 | 1 | 6 | |
| 23 | (Switzerland) | Scott Sutter | DF | 16 | | 1 | | 2 | | | | 16 | | 1 | |
| 28 | (United States) | Jake Nerwinski | DF | 26 | 1 | 1 | | 1 | | | | 27 | 1 | 1 | |
| 29 | (Peru) | Yordy Reyna | MF | 25 | 7 | 5 | | 2 | | | | 27 | 7 | 5 | |
| 31 | (Canada) | Russell Teibert | MF | 26 | | 1 | | 1 | | | | 27 | | 1 | |
| 33 | (Honduras) | Michaell Chirinos | MF | 7 | 1 | 2 | | | | | | 7 | 1 | 2 | |
| 39 | (Canada) | Sean Melvin | GK | | | | | | | | | | | | |
| 46 | (Canada) | Brett Levis | DF | 9 | | 1 | | | | | | 9 | | 1 | |
| 50 | (Canada) | Theo Bair | FW | 17 | 2 | 1 | | 1 | | | | 18 | 2 | 1 | |
| 51 | (Canada) | Thomas Hasal | GK | | | | | | | | | | | | |
| 53 | (Iraq) | Ali Adnan | DF | 28 | 1 | 6 | | 2 | | 1 | | 30 | 1 | 7 | |
| 54 | (Canada) | Simon Colyn | MF | | | | | | | | | | | | |
| 55 | (Canada) | Michael Baldisimo | MF | | | | | | | | | | | | |
| 56 | (Canada) | Georges Mukumbilwa | DF | 1 | | | | | | | | 1 | | | |
| 87 | (Canada) | Tosaint Ricketts | FW | 8 | 1 | 1 | | | | | | 8 | 1 | | |
| 94 | (Brazil) | PC | DF | 18 | | 4 | | 1 | | | | 19 | | 4 | |
| 24 | (Canada) | David Norman Jr. (Note: Sent on loan for the remainder of the season.) | MF | | | | | | | | | | | | |
| 26 | (United States) | Brendan McDonough | DF | 1 | | | | | | | | 1 | | | |
| | (Brazil) | Felipe (Note: No longer with team.) | MF | 18 | 1 | 5 | | 2 | | | | 20 | 1 | 5 | |
| | (Brazil) | Lucas Venuto | MF | 23 | 3 | 3 | | 2 | | 1 | | 25 | 3 | 4 | |
| Own goals | | | | | 0 | | | | 0 | | | | 0 | | |
| Totals | | | | | 33 | 59 | 1 | | 1 | 2 | 0 | | 34 | 61 | 1 |

Source: (for players and positions) First Team Squad (for squad numbers) (for actual stats.)
