= Hwang In-beom =

South Korean footballer (born 1996)

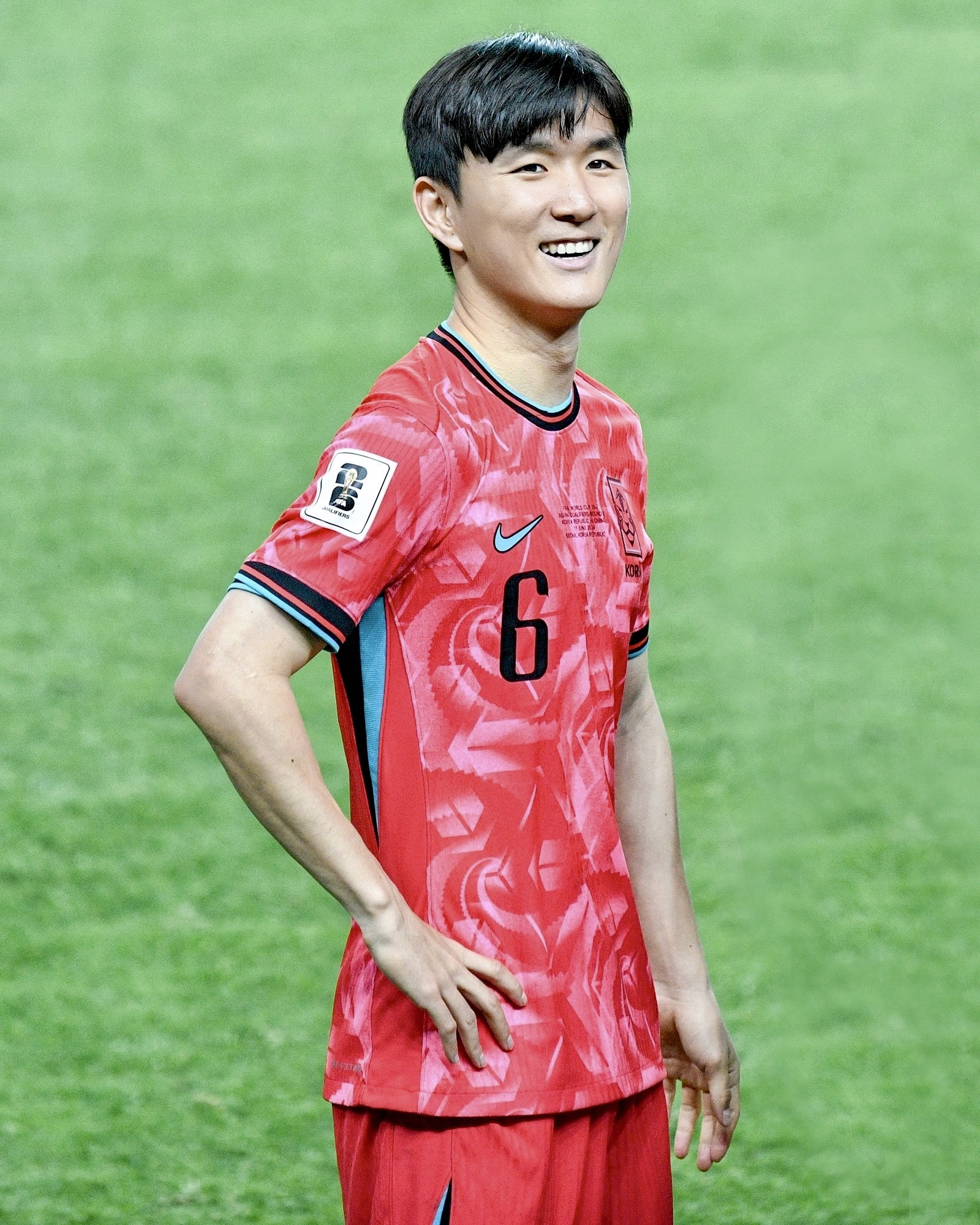
- Hwang with South Korea in 2024

Personal information
- Full name: Hwang In-beom
- Date of birth: 20 September 1996 (age 30)
- Place of birth: Daejeon, South Korea
- Height: 1.77 m (5 ft 10 in)
- Position: Midfielder

Team information
- Current team: Porto
- Number: 16

Youth career
- 2009–2014: Daejeon Citizen (Note: Played for Yuseong Middle School from 2009 to 2011, and Chungnam Mechanical Technical High School from 2012 to 2014, which were academies of Daejeon Citizen.)

Senior career*
Years	Team	Apps	(Gls)
2015–2018	Daejeon Citizen	88	(15)
2018	→ Asan Mugunghwa (draft)	18	(1)
2019–2020	Vancouver Whitecaps FC	40	(3)
2020–2022	Rubin Kazan	35	(5)
2022	→ FC Seoul (loan)	9	(0)
2022–2023	Olympiacos	32	(3)
2023–2024	Red Star Belgrade	32	(5)
2024–2026	Feyenoord	38	(4)
2026–	Porto	9	(1)

International career^{‡}
2012	South Korea U17	3	(0)
2014	South Korea U20	1 (Note: Includes one appearance against non-national team.)	(0)
2017–2018	South Korea U23	10	(2)
2018–	South Korea	80	(7)
Medal record
Representing South Korea
Men's football
Asian Games
Gold medal – first place	2018 Jakarta-Palembang
EAFF Championship
Winner	2019 South Korea
Runner-up	2022 Japan
- * Club domestic league appearances and goals as of 9 November 2026 ‡ National team caps and goals as of 17 November 2026

- Hwang In-beom
- Hangul: 황인범
- Hanja: 黃仁範
- RR: Hwang Inbeom
- MR: Hwang Inbŏm
- IPA: [ɦwaŋ.nin.bʌm]

Hwang In-beom (Korean: 황인범; born 20 September 1996) is a South Korean professional footballer who plays as a midfielder for Primeira Liga club Porto and the South Korea national team.

== Club career ==
=== Daejeon Citizen ===
Hwang signed with Daejeon Citizen in 2015. He scored his first goal in a league match against Pohang Steelers on 30 May and became the youngest scorer in Daejeon history. Daejeon had been relegated to the second division after his first season, but he grew into one of notable young footballers in South Korea.

Hwang joined police's football team Asan Mugunghwa to perform alternative service instead of mandatory military service in 2018, but was discharged from the service after winning a gold medal in the 2018 Asian Games.

=== Vancouver Whitecaps ===
Hwang interested 2. Bundesliga club Hamburger SV after showing positive prospects in Daejeon and national team, but Daejeon sold Hwang to Major League Soccer side Vancouver Whitecaps FC who offered a higher transfer fee than Hamburg. On 30 January 2019, Hwang joined Whitecaps as a Young Designated Player on a two-year contract, with club options for the 2021 and 2022 seasons. He made his debut for Whitecaps against Minnesota United FC on 2 March, and scored his first goal for the side in a 1–0 win over Los Angeles FC on 17 April. In the 30th week of the 2019 season, he was selected for the Team of the Week after providing three assists against LA Galaxy.

=== Rubin Kazan ===
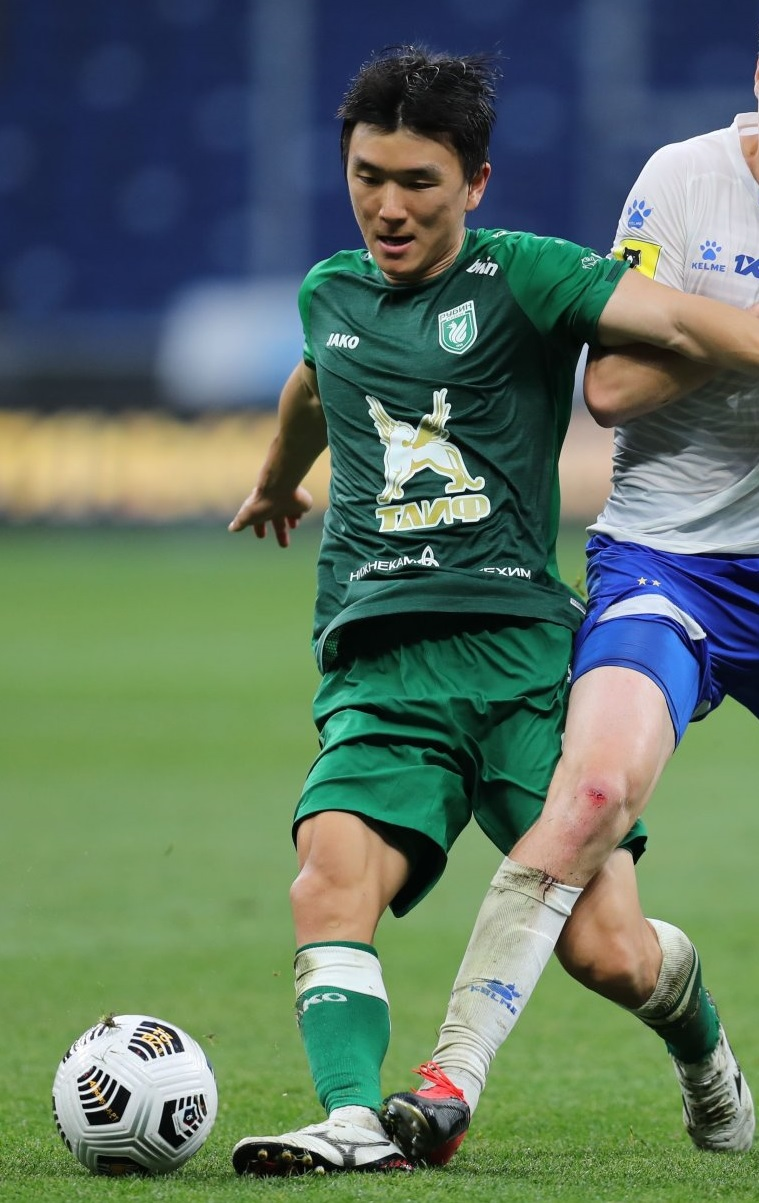
Hwang with Rubin Kazan in 2020

On 14 August 2020, Hwang transferred to Russian club Rubin Kazan. Hwang ranked favorably in statistics for chances created across the Russian Premier League until the first half of the 2020–21 season, but suffered coronavirus and heel injury afterward.

On 3 April 2022, Hwang's contract with Rubin was suspended until 30 June 2022 according to special FIFA regulations related to the Russian invasion of Ukraine. The regulations allow foreign players in Russia to suspend their contracts until the end of the 2021–22 season and sign with a club outside of Russia until that date. Hwang joined FC Seoul on 5 April.

=== Olympiacos ===
On 29 July 2022, Hwang joined Super League Greece club Olympiacos. On 18 August 2022, he scored, on his debut, the equaliser in a Europa League playoff fixture away at Apollon Limassol, which finished 1–1. On 10 March 2023, he was named the Super League Greece Player of the Month for February. After the end of the 2022–23 season, he was selected as the best Olympiacos player and the second best Super League Greece player by league fans. However, he was in conflict with the club just before the next season due to problems related to his contract, and it was possible to become a court fight. He claimed he held a one-year contract with an option for a further two years, whereas Olympiacos claimed a three-year deal.

=== Red Star Belgrade ===
On 4 September 2023, Hwang joined Serbian SuperLiga club Red Star Belgrade on a four-year contract for a club and league-record €5 million fee. He was bought along with Burkinabè centre-back Nasser Djiga and Senegalese winger Cherif Ndiaye in advance of the club's 2023–24 UEFA Champions League campaign. On 9 December, he won a penalty and scored his first goal for Red Star, helping his team gain a 3–1 victory over Mladost Lučani. Red Star extended their unbeaten home run in the Serbian SuperLiga to 122 games with this victory, setting a world record for the longest unbeaten home run in a domestic league. On 13 December, he scored his first Champions League goal and assisted another goal from a corner kick in a 3–2 defeat to Manchester City. On 21 May 2024, he provided an assist from a corner followed by Uroš Spajić's winning goal in the 2023–24 Serbian Cup final against Vojvodina. He was voted SuperLiga Player of the Season for his contributions to Red Star's Double.

=== Feyenoord ===
On 2 September 2024, Hwang signed a four-year contract with Eredivisie club Feyenoord. He received the club's Player of the Month award after his first month at the club, and was selected for the league's Team of the Month the next month. However, his calf was injured in a KNVB Cup match against MVV Maastricht on 17 December, and his playing time was decreased due to an aftereffect after the injury.

=== Porto ===
On 20 July 2026, after participating in the 2026 FIFA World Cup, Hwang joined Primeira Liga champions FC Porto on a contract until June 2029, with an option for a further year, for a transfer fee of €4.5 million, which could rise to €5 million with add-ons. On 1 August, he came on as a 73rd-minute substitute in the 1–0 Supertaça Cândido de Oliveira win over Torreense, making his Porto debut. On 20 September, he scored his first goal for the club in a 3–1 league win over Benfica.

== International career ==
Hwang played a vital role in leading South Korea to the 2018 Asian Games title. As a reward, he was discharged from Asan Mugunghwa less than halfway through his military service and returned to Daejeon Citizen.

Nicknamed the "Bento's crown prince", Hwang was one of South Korean internationals whom manager Paulo Bento trusted most. He made his senior international debut in a 2–0 friendly win over Costa Rica on 7 September 2018, and scored his first senior international goal in a 2–2 friendly draw with Panama on 16 October that year. At the 2019 AFC Asian Cup, he was selected for ESPN's Team of the Tournament after showing impressive play until the quarter-finals, where South Korea lost 1–0 to champions Qatar. At the 2019 EAFF Championship, he was named the competition's Most Valuable Player by leading South Korea to the title. His steady performances under Bento made him participate at the 2022 FIFA World Cup as expected. He played all four of South Korea's matches until the round of 16, where they lost 4–1 to Brazil.

Hwang played for South Korea under Jürgen Klinsmann at the 2023 AFC Asian Cup. He had a goal and an assist in a 3–1 victory over Bahrain, and enticed an opponent to score an own goal in a 2–2 draw with Jordan. He successfully performed his role in the first two group stage matches, but his fans were disappointed with his mistakes responsible for conceding goals to opponents in the other matches. During a 3–3 draw with Malaysia, he lost possession of the ball in front of his team's penalty box and the mistake was followed by opponent's goal. He once again created a similar situation with his inaccurate pass in the 2–1 quarter-final win over Australia. When his teammates on the whole had difficulty during the 2–0 semi-final loss to Jordan, he also failed to make a difference.

Hwang was called up to the South Korea squad for the 2026 FIFA World Cup by new manager Hong Myung-bo. In their opener against Czech Republic, he dominated midfield with his movement and link play as well as having one goal and one assist. After the match ended in a 2–1 win, he was selected as the Player of the Match.

== Style of play ==
J.J. Adams of The National Post noted that Hwang "can play centrally or on the wing, but thrives as an attacking mid — a box-to-box No. 8. He's known for precision passing, aggressive tackling, possession composure and a willingness to take on defenders with the ball at his feet".

After watching Hwang's performance at Feyenoord, Karim El Ahmadi stated "Hwang looked around him carefully while turning to the left or right with his two-footed ability. He put his teammates in the right places and distributed plays in front of defense. He also showed good tackles." Wesley Sneijder also paid attention to Hwang's two-footedness, which can make unforeseeable turns. Sneijder thought Hwang had abilities to change games and to see the run of games. By them, Hwang was compared to Shinji Ono, the former Asian player who helped Feyenoord win the 2001–02 UEFA Cup.

== Career statistics ==
=== Club ===
As of 22 November 2026

Appearances and goals by club, season and competition
Club	Season	League			National cup (Note: Includes Korean FA Cup, Canadian Championship, Russian Cup, Greek Football Cup, Taça de Portugal)		League cup (Note: Includes Taça da Liga)		Continental		Other		Total	
Club	Season	Division	Apps	Goals	Apps	Goals	Apps	Goals	Apps	Goals	Apps	Goals	Apps	Goals
Daejeon Citizen	2015	K League 1	14	4	1	0	—		—		—		15	4
Daejeon Citizen	2016	K League 2	35	5	2	0	—		—		—		37	5
Daejeon Citizen	2017	K League 2	32	4	3	0	—		—		—		35	4
Daejeon Citizen	2018	K League 2	7	2	0	0	—		—		—		7	2
Daejeon Citizen	Total		88	15	6	0	—		—		—		94	15
Asan Mugunghwa (draft)	2018	K League 2	18	1	0	0	—		—		—		18	1
Vancouver Whitecaps FC	2019	Major League Soccer	34	3	1	1	—		—		—		35	4
Vancouver Whitecaps FC	2020	Major League Soccer	6	0	0	0	—		—		—		6	0
Vancouver Whitecaps FC	Total		40	3	1	1	—		—		—		41	4
Rubin Kazan	2020–21	Russian Premier League	18	3	2	1	—		—		—		20	4
Rubin Kazan	2021–22	Russian Premier League	17	2	0	0	—		1 (Note: Appearance in UEFA Conference League)	0	—		18	2
Rubin Kazan	Total		35	5	2	1	—		1	0	—		38	6
FC Seoul (loan)	2022	K League 1	9	0	1	0	—		—		—		10	0
Olympiacos	2022–23	Super League Greece	32	3	3	1	—		5 (Note: Appearances in UEFA Europa League)	1	—		40	5
Red Star Belgrade	2023–24	Serbian SuperLiga	27	5	2	0	—		6 (Note: Appearances in UEFA Champions League)	1	—		35	6
Red Star Belgrade	2024–25	Serbian SuperLiga	5	0	0	0	—		2	0	—		7	0
Red Star Belgrade	Total		32	5	2	0	—		8	1	—		42	6
Feyenoord	2024–25	Eredivisie	21	3	2	0	—		7	0	—		30	3
Feyenoord	2025–26	Eredivisie	17	1	1	0	—		6 (Note: Two appearances in UEFA Champions League, four appearances in UEFA Europa League)	0	—		24	1
Feyenoord	Total		38	4	3	0	—		13	0	—		54	4
Porto	2026–27	Primeira Liga	9	1	1	0	1	0	4	0	1 (Note: Appearance in Supertaça Cândido de Oliveira)	0	16	1
Career total			301	37	19	3	1	0	31	2	1	0	353	42

=== International ===
As of 17 November 2026

Appearances and goals by national team and year
National team	Year	Apps	Goals
South Korea	2018	7	1
South Korea	2019	16	2
South Korea	2021	6	1
South Korea	2022	12	0
South Korea	2023	8	1
South Korea	2024	17	1
South Korea	2025	5	0
South Korea	2026	9	1
Total		80	7

Scores and results list South Korea's goal tally first.

List of international goals scored by Hwang In-beom
No.	Date	Venue	Opponent	Score	Result	Competition
1	16 October 2018	Cheonan Stadium, Cheonan, South Korea	Panama	2–0	2–2	Friendly
2	11 December 2019	Busan Asiad Main Stadium, Busan, South Korea	Hong Kong	1–0	2–0	2019 EAFF Championship
3	18 December 2019	Busan Asiad Main Stadium, Busan, South Korea	Japan	1–0	1–0	2019 EAFF Championship
4	7 October 2021	Ansan Wa~ Stadium, Ansan, South Korea	Syria	1–0	2–1	2022 FIFA World Cup qualification
5	28 March 2023	Seoul World Cup Stadium, Seoul, South Korea	Uruguay	1–1	1–2	Friendly
6	15 January 2024	Jassim bin Hamad Stadium, Al Rayyan, Qatar	Bahrain	1–0	3–1	2023 AFC Asian Cup
7	11 June 2026	Estadio Akron, Zapopan, Mexico	Czech Republic	1–1	2–1	2026 FIFA World Cup

== Honours ==
Red Star Belgrade

- Serbian SuperLiga: 2023–24
- Serbian Cup: 2023–24

Porto

- Supertaça Cândido de Oliveira: 2026

South Korea U23

- Asian Games: 2018

South Korea

- EAFF Championship: 2019

Individual

- K League 2 Best XI: 2016, 2017, 2018
- EAFF Championship Most Valuable Player: 2019
- Super League Greece Player of the Month: February 2023
- Olympiacos Player of the Season by Super League Greece: 2022–23
- Serbian SuperLiga Player of the Season: 2023–24
- Serbian SuperLiga Team of the Season: 2023–24
