= Lucas Venuto =

Brazilian footballer

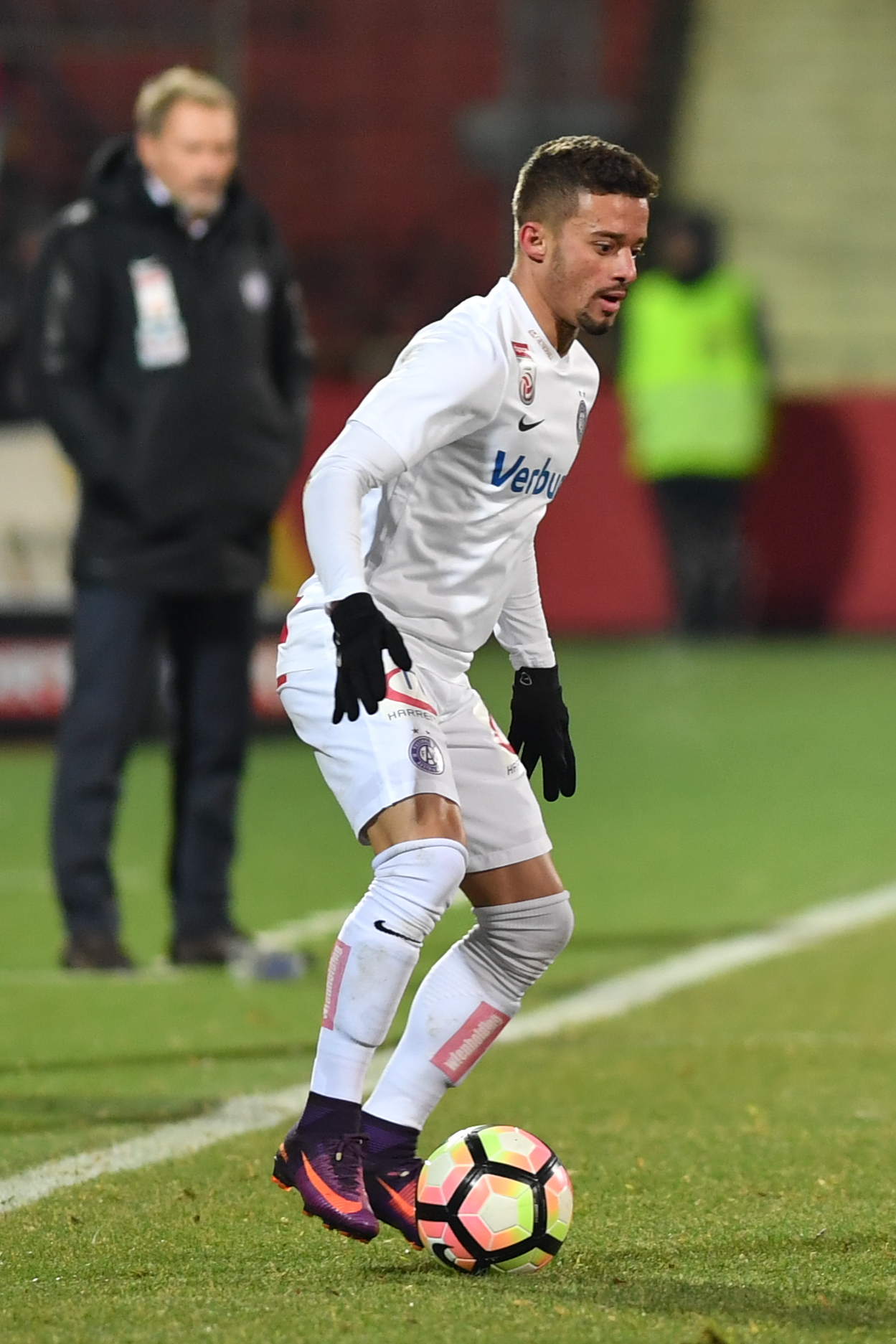

Personal information
- Full name: Lucas Henrique Ferreira Venuto
- Date of birth: 14 January 1995 (age 31)
- Place of birth: Governador Valadares, Brazil
- Height: 1.64 m (5 ft 5 in)
- Position: Forward

Team information
- Current team: Nagaworld
- Number: 7

Youth career
- 2007–2011: Cruzeiro
- 2011–2012: Red Bull Brasil
- 2014: RB Leipzig

Senior career*
Years	Team	Apps	(Gls)
2012–2013	Red Bull Brasil	5	(0)
2014–2015	Liefering	18	(5)
2014–2015	→ Grödig (loan)	11	(0)
2015–2016	Grödig	20	(7)
2016–2019	Austria Wien	81	(13)
2019	Vancouver Whitecaps FC	24	(3)
2019–2022	Santos	8	(0)
2020–2021	→ Sport Recife (loan)	8	(0)
2022	Guarani	17	(0)
2023	Portuguesa	6	(0)
2024	Tombense	5	(1)
2025	Taubaté	18	(3)
2025	Treze	8	(1)
2025–	Nagaworld	24	(5)
- * Club domestic league appearances and goals as of 17:20, 04 September 2026 (UTC)

Lucas Henrique Ferreira Venuto (Brazilian Portuguese: [ˈlukɐz veˈnutu]; born 14 January 1995) is a Brazilian professional association footballer who plays as a forward for Nagaworld.

== Club career ==
=== Early career ===
Born in Governador Valadares, Minas Gerais, Venuto joined Cruzeiro's youth setup in 2007, aged 12. Released at the age of 16, he subsequently joined Red Bull Brasil.

Venuto made his senior debut on 29 February 2012, coming on as a second-half substitute for Aleílson in a 1–0 Campeonato Paulista Série A2 home loss against América-SP. Despite being his only appearance of the campaign, he was promoted to the senior squad in November.

=== Red Bull Salzburg / Grödig ===
In January 2014, Venuto moved abroad and joined RB Leipzig's under-19 side. In July, however, he joined FC Red Bull Salzburg and was assigned to the reserve team, FC Liefering. He made his debut abroad on 18 July, starting in a 3–0 away defeat of TSV Hartberg for the Austrian Football Second League championship.

Venuto scored his first senior goal on 29 August 2014, netting his team's third in a 4–1 home routing of SV Horn. The following 31 January, after scoring five goals, he was loaned to Austrian Football Bundesliga side SV Grödig for the remainder of the campaign. In June, he signed a permanent contract with the latter side.

=== Austria Wien ===
On 8 January 2016, after scoring seven goals during the campaign, Venuto signed a contract with FK Austria Wien until 2019. He made his debut for the new club on 6 February, starting in a 1–0 away success over former side Grödig.

Venuto scored his first goal for Austria Wien on 23 April 2016, scoring the seventh in a 9–0 away routing of SV Mattersburg. On 31 July, he scored a brace in a 3–1 home win against the same opponent.

=== Vancouver Whitecaps ===
On 25 January 2019, Venuto was transferred to Major League Soccer side Vancouver Whitecaps FC, agreeing to a three-year contract. He made his debut in the MLS on 2 March, playing the last 21 minutes in a 3–2 home loss against Minnesota United FC.

Venuto scored his first goal for the Caps on 4 May 2019, netting his team's second in a 3–2 away win against Colorado Rapids. On 1 August, Venuto terminated his contract with the club, after three league goals in 22 appearances.

=== Santos ===
==== 2019 season ====
On 6 August 2019, Venuto returned to his home country after agreeing to a three-and-a-half-year contract with Santos. He made his debut for the club on 8 September, replacing Jean Mota in a 1–1 home draw against Athletico Paranaense.

==== Sport Recife (loan) ====
On 6 August 2020, after being rarely used, Venuto was loaned to fellow top tier side Sport Recife until the end of the season.

==== 2021 season ====
Upon returning in February 2021, Venuto was again rarely used, only featuring twice with manager Ariel Holan and once with manager Fernando Diniz. On 10 January 2022, he agreed to leave the club after terminating his contract.

=== Guarani and Portuguesa ===
On 19 January 2022, Venuto was announced at Guarani. Roughly one year later, he joined Portuguesa.

== Career statistics ==
As of 1 March 2023

Club	Season	League			State League		Cup		Continental		Other		Total	
Club	Season	Division	Apps	Goals	Apps	Goals	Apps	Goals	Apps	Goals	Apps	Goals	Apps	Goals
Red Bull Brasil	2012	Paulista A2	—		1	0	—		—		—		1	0
Red Bull Brasil	2013	Paulista A2	—		4	0	—		—		7 (Note: Appearance(s) in Copa Paulista)	0	11	0
Red Bull Brasil	Total		—		5	0	—		—		7	0	12	0
Liefering	2014–15	Austrian Football First League	18	5	—		—		—		—		18	5
Grödig	2014–15	Austrian Football Bundesliga	11	0	—		2	0	—		—		13	0
Grödig	2015–16	Austrian Football Bundesliga	20	7	—		1	0	—		—		21	7
Grödig	Total		31	7	—		3	0	—		—		34	7
Austria Wien	2015–16	Austrian Football Bundesliga	15	3	—		2	1	—		—		17	4
Austria Wien	2016–17	Austrian Football Bundesliga	29	7	—		3	1	12 (Note: Appearance(s) in UEFA Europa League)	0	—		44	8
Austria Wien	2017–18	Austrian Football Bundesliga	14	1	—		0	0	1	0	—		15	1
Austria Wien	2018–19	Austrian Football Bundesliga	10	1	—		1	0	—		—		11	1
Austria Wien	Total		68	12	—		6	2	13	0	—		87	14
Vancouver Whitecaps FC	2019	Major League Soccer	22	3	—		—		—		2 (Note: Appearance(s) in Canadian Championship)	0	24	3
Santos	2019	Série A	4	0	—		—		—		—		4	0
Santos	2020	Série A	0	0	1	0	0	0	0	0	—		1	0
Santos	2021	Série A	1	0	2	0	0	0	—		—		3	0
Santos	Total		5	0	3	0	0	0	0	0	—		8	0
Sport Recife (loan)	2020	Série A	8	0	—		—		—		—		8	0
Guarani	2022	Série B	10	0	7	0	1	0	—		—		18	0
Portuguesa	2023	Paulista	—		6	0	—		—		—		6	0
Career total			162	27	21	0	10	2	13	0	9	0	215	29
