= Raheem Edwards =

Raheem Edwards may refer to:

- Raheem Edwards (born 1995), Canadian soccer player
- Raheem Edwards (born 2002), Jamaican footballer
