= Brendan McDonough =

American soccer player

Personal information
- Full name: Brendan McDonough
- Date of birth: December 27, 1996 (age 29)
- Place of birth: Atlanta, Georgia, U.S.
- Height: 1.88 m (6 ft 2 in)
- Position: Defender

Youth career
- Charlotte Soccer Academy

College career
| Years | Team | Apps | (Gls) |
| 2015–2018 | Georgetown Hoyas | 63 | (2) |

Senior career*
| Years | Team | Apps | (Gls) |
| 2019 | Vancouver Whitecaps | 1 | (0) |
| 2019 | → Charlotte Independence (loan) | 3 | (0) |
- * Club domestic league appearances and goals as of October 18, 2019

Brendan McDonough (born December 27, 1996) is an American football player.

== Career ==
=== Early life ===
McDonough was born in Atlanta, Georgia, but raised in Charlotte, North Carolina. He played three years for Charlotte Catholic High School, while spending his junior year in Germany training with both FT Braunschweig and Eintracht Braunschweig.

=== College ===
McDonough played four years of college soccer at Georgetown University between 2015 and 2018, where he made 63 appearances, scoring 2 goals, and tallying 2 assists.

=== Professional ===
On January 11, 2019, McDonough was selected 35th overall in the 2019 MLS SuperDraft by Vancouver Whitecaps FC. He was officially added to the club's roster on March 6, 2019, signing an MLS contract for 2019 with options through to 2022.

McDonough made his professional debut on June 26, 2019, starting in a 2–2 draw with FC Dallas.

On August 7, 2019, McDonough was loaned to USL Championship side Charlotte Independence for the remainder of the season.

McDonough was released by Vancouver at the end of the 2019 season.
