= Chituru Odunze =

American soccer player (born 2002)

Personal information
- Full name: Chituru Ethan Odunze
- Date of birth: October 14, 2002 (age 24)
- Place of birth: Raleigh, North Carolina, United States
- Height: 2.00 m (6 ft 6 1/2 in)
- Position: Goalkeeper

Team information
- Current team: Phoenix Rising FC (on loan from Charlotte FC)
- Number: 14

Youth career
- 2007: Kingfishers
- 2008: Thames Moorings
- 2009–2010: Royal Greenwich
- 2010–2013: Chelsea
- 2014: Calgary Villains FC
- 2015: Calgary Blizzard SC
- 2015–2016: Calgary Foothills FC
- 2017–2019: Vancouver Whitecaps
- 2019–2023: Leicester City

Senior career*
| Years | Team | Apps | (Gls) |
| 2023–2025 | Crown Legacy | 25 | (0) |
| 2024– | Charlotte FC | 0 | (0) |
| 2026– | → Phoenix Rising FC (loan) | 7 | (0) |

International career^{‡}
| 2018–2019 | United States U17 | 5 | (0) |
| 2020 | United States U20 | 1 | (0) |
| 2023– | United States U23 | 2 | (0) |
- * Club domestic league appearances and goals as of 18:52, 10 November 2026 (UTC) ‡ National team caps and goals as of November 11, 2020

Chituru Ethan Odunze (born October 14, 2002) is an American professional soccer player who plays as a goalkeeper for Phoenix Rising FC in the USL Championship, on loan from Major League Soccer club Charlotte FC.

== Early life ==
Born in Raleigh, North Carolina, Odunze moved to London, England as a child and played for local youth teams before spending time in the Chelsea academy. He moved to Calgary, Alberta when he was eleven and played for local sides Calgary Villains FC and Calgary Blizzard SC. During this time, he went on trial with Welsh side Cardiff City, training with the first team despite only being fourteen. In January 2019, he joined the Vancouver Whitecaps Academy from Calgary Foothills. Later in the same year, Odunze signed with English side Leicester City. He went on to train with the senior squad.

== Club career ==
On August 2, 2023, Odunze signed a professional contract with Crown Legacy FC in MLS Next Pro.

Odunze signed with the Charlotte FC first team on January 18, 2024. His Major League Soccer contract is guaranteed through 2027 with a club option for 2028.

In February 2026, Odunze was loaned from Charlotte FC to USL Championship side Phoenix Rising ahead of the 2026 season.

== Personal life ==
Chituru is of Igbo Nigerian descent.

== International ==
Odunze is eligible for the United States, England, Canada, and Nigeria. He was called up to the Canada under-15 side in 2017 but has represented the United States at under-17 and under-20 levels. He represented the United States at the 2019 FIFA U-17 World Cup, playing in two group-stage games.

In November 2020, Odunze was called up to the senior United States national team for the first time.
