= 2024 Sporting Kansas City season =

Sporting Kansas City
2024 season
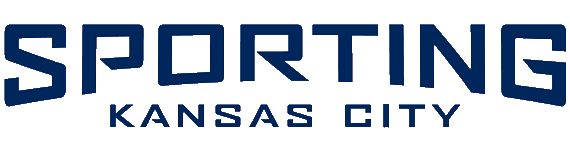
- Owner: Sporting Club
- Head coach: Peter Vermes
- Stadium: Children's Mercy Park
- MLS: Conference: 13th Overall: 27th
- MLS Cup playoffs: Did not qualify
- U.S. Open Cup: Runners-up
- Leagues Cup: Round of 32
- Average home league attendance: 21,193
Home colors	Away colors

The 2024 Sporting Kansas City season was the 29th season of the team's existence in Major League Soccer and the 14th year played under the Sporting Kansas City moniker. Sporting Kansas City opened the season against the Houston Dynamo on February 24, 2024. In 2024, Sporting KC was one of the eight MLS teams that are participating in the 2024 U.S. Open Cup instead of sending an MLS Next Pro team.

== Roster ==
As of February 8, 2024

Note: Flags indicate national team as defined under FIFA eligibility rules; some limited exceptions apply. Players may hold more than one non-FIFA nationality.

No.	Pos.	Nation	Player
1	GK	USA	John Pulskamp
3	DF	ESP	Andreu Fontàs
4	DF	GER	Robert Voloder
5	DF	COL	Daniel Rosero
6	MF	SRB	Nemanja Radoja
7	FW	SCO	Johnny Russell (captain)
8	MF	USA	Memo Rodríguez
9	FW	MEX	Alan Pulido
10	FW	HUN	Dániel Sallói
11	FW	USA	Khiry Shelton
14	DF	GER	Tim Leibold
17	DF	USA	Jake Davis
18	DF	BEL	Logan Ndenbe
19	DF	USA	Robert Castellanos

No.	Pos.	Nation	Player
20	FW	HON	Alenis Vargas
21	MF	USA	Felipe Hernández
22	DF	CAN	Zorhan Bassong
23	FW	NGR	William Agada
24	DF	USA	Kayden Pierre
25	FW	USA	Ozzie Cisneros
26	MF	GER	Erik Thommy
28	DF	USA	Chris Rindov
29	GK	USA	Tim Melia
30	FW	CAN	Stephen Afrifa
31	MF	USA	Danny Flores
36	GK	USA	Ryan Schewe
54	MF	FRA	Rémi Walter
77	FW	CYP	Marinos Tzionis

== Competitive ==
=== Major League Soccer ===
==== Standings ====
===== Western Conference =====
MLS Western Conference table (2024)
Pos	Team	Pld	W	L	T	GF	GA	GD	Pts
10	Austin FC	34	11	14	9	39	48	−9	42
11	FC Dallas	34	11	15	8	54	56	−2	41
12	St. Louis City SC	34	8	13	13	50	63	−13	37
13	Sporting Kansas City	34	8	19	7	51	66	−15	31
14	San Jose Earthquakes	34	6	25	3	41	78	−37	21

Source: MLS
Rules for classification: 1) points; 2) total wins; 3) total goal differential; 4) total goals scored; 5) fewer disciplinary points; 6) away goal differential; 7) away goals scored; 8) home goals differential; 9) home goals scored; 10) coin toss (2 clubs tied) or drawing of lots (≥3 clubs tied)

===== Overall table =====
Overall MLS standings table
Pos	Team	Pld	W	L	T	GF	GA	GD	Pts	Qualification
25	Nashville SC	34	9	16	9	38	54	−16	36	Qualification for the U.S. Open Cup round of 32 (Note: As one of the U.S. teams who did not qualify for the 2025 CONCACAF Champions Cup or the 2025 Leagues Cup)
26	New England Revolution	34	9	21	4	37	74	−37	31	Qualification for the U.S. Open Cup round of 32
27	Sporting Kansas City	34	8	19	7	51	66	−15	31	Qualification for the CONCACAF Champions Cup round one (Note: Sporting Kansas City qualified as 2024 U.S. Open Cup finalists as the winners, Los Angeles FC, had already qualified via the 2024 Leagues Cup.)
28	Chicago Fire FC	34	7	18	9	40	62	−22	30	Qualification for the U.S. Open Cup round of 32
29	San Jose Earthquakes	34	6	25	3	41	78	−37	21	Qualification for the U.S. Open Cup round of 32

Source: MLS
Rules for classification: 1) points; 2) total wins; 3) total goal differential; 4) total goals scored; 5) fewer disciplinary points; 6) away goal differential; 7) away goals scored; 8) home goals differential; 9) home goals scored; 10) coin toss (2 clubs tied) or drawing of lots (≥3 clubs tied)

==== Match results ====
February 24 1	Houston Dynamo FC	1–1	Sporting Kansas City	Houston, Texas
7:30 PM CST	Segal 69'	Report	Russell (yellow card) 57'; Thommy 61', (yellow card) 67'	Stadium: Shell Energy Stadium; Attendance: 18,818; Referee: Jaime Herrera

March 2 2	Sporting Kansas City	1–1	Philadelphia Union	Kansas City, Kansas
7:30 PM CST	Walter 19'; Russell (yellow card) 90+3'	Report	Bedoya (yellow card) 49', (goal) 90+5'; Lowe (yellow card) 58'	Stadium: Children's Mercy Park; Attendance: 19,942; Referee: Rafael Bonilla

March 9 3	Los Angeles FC	0–0	Sporting Kansas City	Los Angeles, California
9:30 PM CST	Campos (yellow card) 31'; Atuesta (yellow card) 88'	Report	Rodríguez (yellow card) 27'; Fontàs (yellow card) 49'; Rosero (yellow card) 60'; Davis (yellow card) 90+2'	Stadium: BMO Stadium; Attendance: 22,175; Referee: Lorenzo Hernandez

March 16 4	Sporting Kansas City	2–1	San Jose Earthquakes	Kansas City, Kansas
7:30 PM CDT	Rosero 18', (yellow card) 35'; Pulido 29'; Sallói (yellow card) 82'; Thommy (yellow card) 90+1'	Report	Vítor Costa 11'; Bouda (yellow card) 66'; Espinoza (yellow card) 81'	Stadium: Children's Mercy Park; Attendance: 18,219; Referee: Amin Hadzic

March 23 5	Sporting Kansas City	2–3	LA Galaxy	Kansas City, Kansas
7:30 PM CDT	Radoja 34'; Agada 45+3'; Thommy (yellow card) 53'; Leibold (yellow card) 69'	Report	Zavaleta 72'; Joveljić 75'; Delgado 80'; Brugman (yellow card) 88'	Stadium: Children's Mercy Park; Attendance: 18,102; Referee: Aleksandar Zhelyazkov

March 30 6	Toronto FC	1–3	Sporting Kansas City	Toronto, Ontario
6:30 PM CDT	Coello (yellow card) 57'; Osorio (yellow card) 85', (goal) 90+7'	Report	Davis (yellow card) 44', (goal) 64'; Walter 57'; Leibold (yellow card) 71'; Vargas 83'	Stadium: BMO Field; Attendance: 24,382; Referee: Guido Gonzales Jr.

April 7 7	Sporting Kansas City	3–3	Portland Timbers	Kansas City, Kansas
12:30 PM CDT	Agada 13', 45+3'; Rosero (yellow card) 25', (goal) 38'; Rodríguez (yellow card) 48'; Davis (yellow card) 90+8'	Report	K. Miller (yellow card) 34'; Evander 64'; Mora 66'; E. Miller 81', (yellow card) 82'	Stadium: Children's Mercy Park; Attendance: 17,424; Referee: Armando Villarreal

April 13 8	Sporting Kansas City	2–3	Inter Miami CF	Kansas City, Missouri
7:30 PM CDT	Thommy 6', 58'; Hernández (yellow card) 79'; Radoja (yellow card) 83'; Davis (yellow card) 89'	Report	Avilés (yellow card) 15'; Gómez 18', (yellow card) 56'; Messi 51'; Suárez 71'	Stadium: Arrowhead Stadium; Attendance: 72,610; Referee: Victor Rivas

April 20 9	Sporting Kansas City	3–3	St. Louis City SC	Kansas City, Kansas
7:30 PM CDT	Pulido 17'; Sallói (yellow card) 45+7'; Radoja (yellow card) 47'; Bürki 65' (o.g.); Davis (yellow card) 71'; Thommy 77'	Report	Klauss 31'; Pompeu 45+3', (yellow card) 85'; Parker (yellow card) 63'; Totland 90+2'	Stadium: Children's Mercy Park; Attendance: 19,637; Referee: Allen Chapman

April 27 10	Minnesota United FC	2–1	Sporting Kansas City	Saint Paul, Minnesota
7:30 PM CDT	Boxall 2' (yellow card) 63'; Oluwaseyi 25'; Padelford (yellow card) 32'	Report	Fontàs (yellow card) 23'; Pulido 38'	Stadium: Allianz Field; Attendance: 19,712; Referee: Ted Unkel

May 4 11	Real Salt Lake	1–0	Sporting Kansas City	Sandy, Utah
8:30 PM CDT	Eneli (yellow card) 14'; Vera (yellow card) 47'; Arango 81', (yellow card) 90'	Report	Rodríguez (yellow card) 90+4'	Stadium: America First Field; Attendance: 20,001; Referee: Timothy Ford

May 11 12	Sporting Kansas City	1–2	Houston Dynamo FC	Kansas City, Kansas
7:30 PM CDT	Rodríguez (yellow card) 45'; Sallói 61'; Fontàs (yellow card) 85'	Report	Herrera 31'; Aliyu 78'; Kowalczyk (yellow card) 90+4'	Stadium: Children's Mercy Park; Attendance: 18,562; Referee: Alexis Da Silva

May 18 13	Austin FC	3–2	Sporting Kansas City	Austin, Texas
7:30 PM CDT	Cascante (yellow card) 23'; Obrian 28', 39'; Driussi 46'; Kolmanič (yellow card) 70'; Pereira (yellow card) 89'; Valencia (yellow card) 90'	Report	Russell 19'; Davis 63'; Fontàs (yellow card) 88'; Radoja (yellow card) 90+4'	Stadium: Q2 Stadium; Attendance: 20,738; Referee: Sergii Boiko

May 25 14	Portland Timbers	2–1	Sporting Kansas City	Portland, Oregon
9:30 PM CDT	Mora 51'; Evander 79'	Report	Rodríguez (yellow card) 41', (goal) 63'	Stadium: Providence Park; Attendance: 22,848; Referee: Drew Fischer

May 29 15	Sporting Kansas City	1–2	Vancouver Whitecaps FC	Kansas City, Kansas
7:30 PM CDT	Shelton (yellow card) 43'; Castellanos (yellow card) 75'; Tzionis 90+2'	Report	Utvik (yellow card) 7'; Gauld 39', 82'	Stadium: Children's Mercy Park; Attendance: 17,046; Referee: Rosendo Mendoza

June 1 16	Minnesota United FC	3–1	Sporting Kansas City	Saint Paul, Minnesota
7:30 PM CDT	Padelford (yellow card) 16'; Harvey (yellow card) 25'; Oluwaseyi 33', (yellow card) 64'; Lod 67'; Arriaga 83'; Rosales (yellow card) 88'	Report	Radoja (yellow card) 32'; Russell 86'	Stadium: Allianz Field; Attendance: 19,738; Referee: Joe Dickerson

June 8 17	Sporting Kansas City	2–1	Seattle Sounders FC	Kansas City, Kansas
7:30 PM CDT	Russell 19', (yellow card) 71'; Davis (yellow card) 45+2'; Vargas 85'; Shelton (yellow card) 90+4'	Report	Morris 12'; Baker-Whiting (yellow card) 61' (yellow-red card) 73'; Yeimar (yellow card) 71'	Stadium: Children's Mercy Park; Attendance: 18,177; Referee: Guido Gonzales, Jr.

June 15 18	LA Galaxy	4–2	Sporting Kansas City	Carson, California
9:30 PM CDT	Joveljic 40', (yellow card) 44'; Neal (yellow card) 49'; Pec 54'; Paintsil (yellow card) 68', (goal) 75'; Berry 90+2'	Report	Afrifa 66'; Castellanos 82'; Davis (yellow card) 90+3'	Stadium: Dignity Health Sports Park; Attendance: 22,198; Referee: Chris Penso

June 19 19	Sporting Kansas City	3–4	Real Salt Lake	Kansas City, Kansas
7:30 PM CDT	Afrifa 28'; Agada 70', 90+5'; Bassong (yellow card) 90+2'	Report	A. Gómez 14', 51'; Julio 33'; Vera (yellow card) 77'; Crooks 84'	Stadium: Children's Mercy Park; Attendance: 16,414; Referee: Mark Allatin

June 22 20	Columbus Crew	4–0	Sporting Kansas City	Columbus, Ohio
6:30 PM CDT	Hernández 32', 45+2', 71'; Ramirez 66'	Report	Rodríguez (yellow card) 57'; Rosero (yellow card) 75'	Stadium: Lower.com Field; Attendance: 20,818; Referee: Marcos DeOliveira II

June 29 21	Sporting Kansas City	2–0	Austin FC	Kansas City, Kansas
7:30 PM CDT	Leibold 26'; Davis (yellow card) 34'; Pulido (yellow card) 45+3'; Afrifa 69'; Russell (yellow card) 90+2'	Report	Wolff (yellow card) 29'; Rubio (yellow card) 34'; Valencia (yellow card) 64'	Stadium: Children's Mercy Park; Attendance: 18,722; Referee: Filip Dujic

July 4 22	Colorado Rapids	2–1	Sporting Kansas City	Commerce City, Colorado
8:30 PM CDT	Harris (yellow card) 54'; Larraz 69'; Mihailovic (yellow card) 87', (goal) 90+4'	Report	Russell 48'; Radoja (yellow card) 73'; Melia (yellow card) 90+3'	Stadium: Dick's Sporting Goods Park; Attendance: 18,183; Referee: Sergii Boiko

July 7 23	Sporting Kansas City	3–2	FC Dallas	Kansas City, Kansas
7:30 PM CDT	Agada 11', 23'; Castellanos (yellow card) 15'; Rodríguez 82'; Bassong (yellow card) 85' (red card) 90+4'	Report	Melia 30' (o.g.); Musa 65'; Arriola (yellow card) 90+5'	Stadium: Children's Mercy Park; Attendance: 17,457; Referee: Natalie Simon

July 13 24	San Jose Earthquakes	1–2	Sporting Kansas City	San Jose, California
9:30 PM CDT	Kikanović (yellow card) 37'; Shelton 83' (o.g.); Skahan (yellow card) 87'	Report	Leibold (yellow card) 38'; Thommy 48'; Pulido 57'	Stadium: PayPal Park; Attendance: 12,034; Referee: Alexis Da Silva

July 17 25	Vancouver Whitecaps FC	2–1	Sporting Kansas City	Vancouver, British Columbia
9:30 PM CDT	Voloder 34' (o.g.); Picault 76'	Report	Agada 69'; Voloder (yellow card) 87'	Stadium: BC Place; Attendance: 23,198; Referee: Marcos De Oliveira

July 20 26	Sporting Kansas City	1–1	St. Louis City SC	Kansas City, Kansas
7:30 PM CDT	Agada 73'; Leibold (yellow card) 84'; Shelton (yellow card) 89'	Report	Thórisson (yellow card) 34', (goal) 42'; Watts (yellow card) 45+1'; Kijima (yellow card) 90+4'	Stadium: Children's Mercy Park; Attendance: 19,876; Referee: Rubiel Vazquez

August 24 27	Sporting Kansas City	3–0	Orlando City SC	Kansas City, Kansas
7:30 PM CDT	Davis 44'; Agada (yellow card) 51' (red card) 70'; Sallói 52'; Walter 90+2'; Russell (yellow card) 90+9'	Report	Santos (yellow card) 84'; Enrique (yellow card) 90'	Stadium: Children's Mercy Park; Attendance: 17,383; Referee: Timothy Ford

September 7 28	New York Red Bulls	1–1	Sporting Kansas City	Harrison, New Jersey
6:30 PM CDT	Donkor (yellow card) 22'; Carballo (yellow card) 66'; Hall 89'	Report	Pulido 55'; Davis (yellow card) 87' (yellow-red card) 90+2'	Stadium: Red Bull Arena; Attendance: 17,708; Referee: Ramy Touchan

September 15 29	Seattle Sounders FC	2–0	Sporting Kansas City	Seattle, Washington
6:00 PM CDT	Ragen 19'; Baker-Whiting (yellow card) 29'; Rothrock 40'	Report	Sallói (yellow card) 37'; Bassong (yellow card) 46'	Stadium: Lumen Field; Attendance: 31,898; Referee: Drew Fischer

September 18 30	Sporting Kansas City	4–1	Colorado Rapids	Kansas City, Kansas
7:30 PM CDT	Pulido 8', 49'; Thommy 69', 82'; Sallói (yellow card) 74'; Vargas (yellow card) 90+2'	Report	Harris (yellow card) 16'; Navarro (yellow card) 38'; Edwards 75'	Stadium: Children's Mercy Park; Attendance: 14,826; Referee: Fotis Bazakos

September 21 31	Sporting Kansas City	0–2	Minnesota United FC	Kansas City, Kansas
7:30 PM CDT	Davis (yellow card) 36'	Report	Yeboah 65'; Tapias (yellow card) 79'; Hlongwane 90+4'	Stadium: Children's Mercy Park; Attendance: 17,328; Referee: Ismir Pekmic

September 28 32	St. Louis City SC	3–1	Sporting Kansas City	St. Louis, Missouri
7:30 PM CDT	Teuchert 33', (yellow card) 80'; Klauss (yellow card) 39'; Alm 54'; Löwen 75'; Horn (yellow card) 86'	Report	Rosero (yellow card) 45'; Pulskamp (yellow card) 45'; Voloder (yellow card) 45+5'; Afrifa 63'	Stadium: CityPark; Attendance: 22,423; Referee: Guido Gonzales, Jr.

October 5 33	Sporting Kansas City	0–3	Los Angeles FC	Kansas City, Kansas
7:30 PM CDT	Rodríguez (yellow card) 25'	Report	Martínez 14'; Tillman (yellow card) 25'; Olivera 45+1', (yellow card) 79'; Long 69'	Stadium: Children's Mercy Park; Attendance: 18,554; Referee: Marcos DeOliveira

October 19 34	FC Dallas	2–1	Sporting Kansas City	Frisco, Texas
8:00 PM CDT	Musa 16', (yellow card) 55'; Fernández 40' (o.g.)	Report	Leibold (yellow card) 28'; Agada 89'	Stadium: Toyota Stadium; Attendance: 19,096; Referee: Katja Koroleva

=== US Open Cup ===
May 8 Round of 32	Union Omaha (USL1) (Nebraska)	1–2 (a.e.t.)	Sporting Kansas City (MLS)	Omaha, Nebraska
7:00 PM	Kunga 31'; Mastrantonio (yellow card) 57'; Knapp (yellow card) 81'; Gallardo (yellow card) 90+7'	Report	Tzionis 48'; Rodríguez (yellow card) 66'; Russell (yellow card) 78'; Radoja (yellow card) 91'; Voloder (yellow card) 108'; Pulido 120'	Stadium: Caniglia Field; Attendance: 4,733; Referee: David Schmidt-Schweda

May 21 Round of 16	Sporting Kansas City (MLS)	4–0	(Oklahoma) FC Tulsa (USLC)	Kansas City, Kansas
7:30 PM CDT	Hernández 38', 63'; Afrifa 45+3', (yellow card) 71'; Tzionis 65'	Report	Portillo (yellow card) 25'; Seagrist (yellow card) 30' (yellow-red card) 46'	Stadium: Children's Mercy Park; Attendance: 10,088; Referee: Jorge Gonzalez

July 10 Quarterfinals	Sporting Kansas City (MLS)	2–1 (a.e.t.)	(Texas) FC Dallas (MLS)	Kansas City, Kansas
8:00 PM CDT	Agada 77'; Rodríguez (yellow card) 92'; Davis (yellow card) 99'; Rosero 111', (yellow card) 113'	Report	Tafari (yellow card) 68'; Illarramendi (yellow card) 79'; Musa 86'	Stadium: Children's Mercy Park; Attendance: 12,943

August 27 Semifinals	Sporting Kansas City (MLS)	2–0	(Indiana) Indy Eleven (USLC)	Kansas City, Kansas
7:00 PM CDT	Russell 14'; Rosero 35'	Report		Stadium: Children's Mercy Park

September 25 Final	Los Angeles FC (California)	3–1 (a.e.t.)	Sporting Kansas City	Los Angeles, California
9:30 PM CDT	Giroud 53', (yellow card) 55'; Segura (yellow card) 64'; Campos (yellow card) 72', (goal) 102'; Hollingshead (yellow card) 92'; Kamara 109'		Russell (yellow card) 43'; Bassong (yellow card) 58'; Thommy 60'; Rodríguez (yellow card) 119'	Stadium: BMO Stadium; Referee: Armando Villarreal

=== 2024 Leagues Cup ===
==== Group Stage (West 4) ====
Pos	Team	Pld	W	PW	PL	L	GF	GA	GD	Pts	Qualification	TOL	SKC	CHI
1	(Mexican Football Federation) Toluca	2	2	0	0	0	5	2	+3	6	Advance to knockout stage	—	2–1	3–1
2	(United States Soccer Federation) Sporting Kansas City	2	1	0	0	1	3	3	0	3	Advance to knockout stage	—	—	2–1
3	(United States Soccer Federation) Chicago Fire FC	2	0	0	0	2	2	5	−3	0		—	—	—

Source: Leagues Cup
Rules for classification: Tiebreakers

July 28 Group stage	Sporting Kansas City (United States)	2–1	(United States) Chicago Fire FC	Kansas City, Kansas
8:00 PM CDT	Castellanos 39'; Agada 76'	Report	Koutsias 22'; Shannon (yellow card) 53'	Stadium: Children's Mercy Park; Attendance: 14,047; Referee: Rubiel Vazquez

August 5 Group stage	Toluca (Mexico)	2–1	(United States) Sporting Kansas City	Kansas City, Kansas
8:00 PM CDT	Angulo 40'; Araújo 66'; Meneses (yellow card) 90+3'	Report	Afrifa 45+1'; Leibold (yellow card) 45+3'; Rosero (yellow card) 79'	Stadium: Children's Mercy Park; Attendance: 14,797; Referee: Fernando Guerrero

==== Knockout stage ====
August 9 Round of 32	Columbus Crew (United States)	4–0	(United States) Sporting Kansas City	Columbus, Ohio
18:30 CDT	Rossi 44', 57'; Jones 77'; Chambost 79'	Report		Stadium: Lower.com Field; Attendance: 20,397; Referee: Juan Calderon Perez
