= 2024 U.S. Open Cup final =

Final match in U.S. soccer tournament

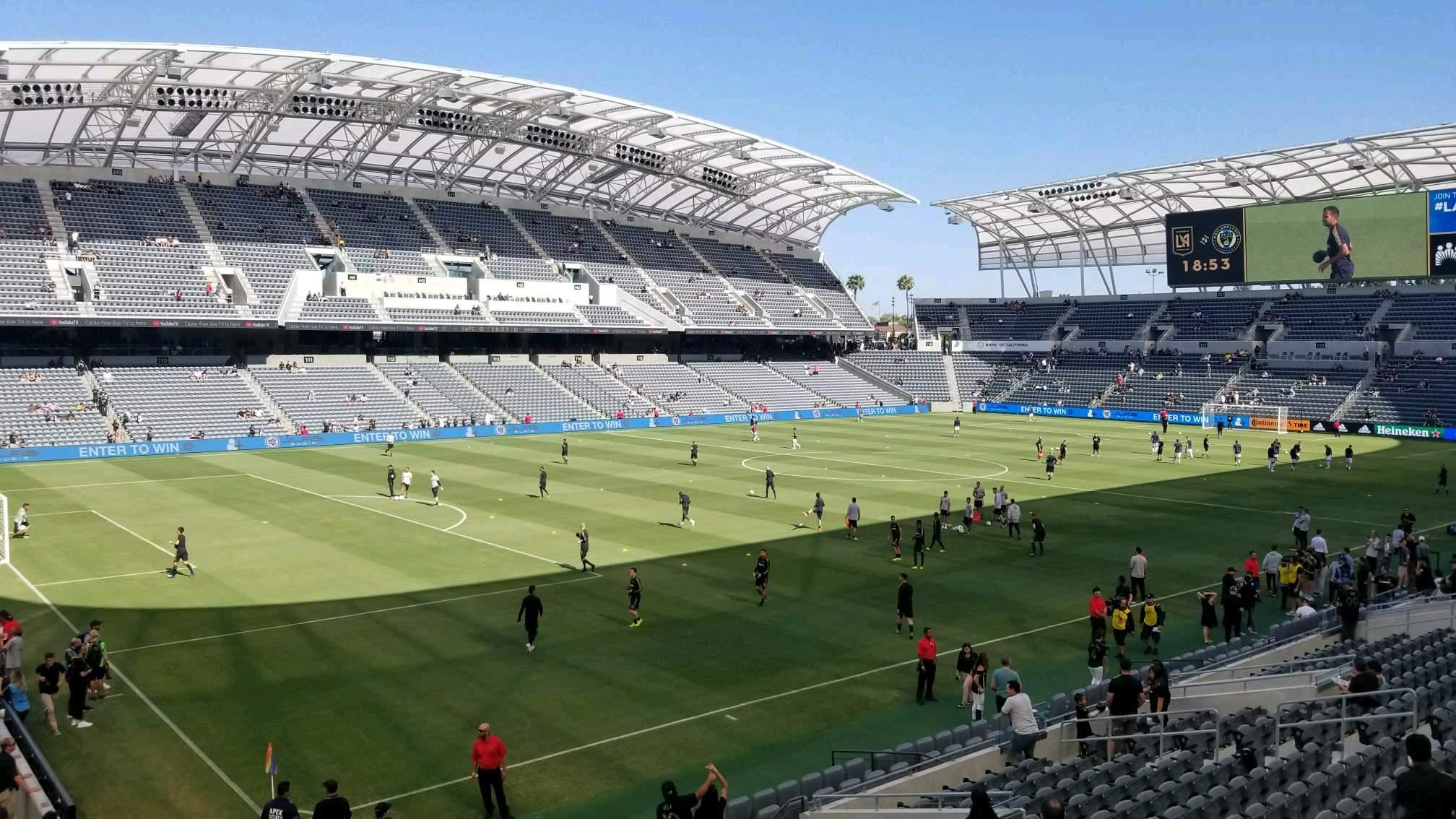
- BMO Stadium, the host venue for the final
- Event: 2024 U.S. Open Cup
| Los Angeles FC | Sporting Kansas City |
| MLS | MLS |
| 3 | 1 |
- After extra time
- Date: September 25, 2024
- Venue: BMO Stadium, Los Angeles, California
- Referee: Armando Villarreal
- Attendance: 22,214

The 2024 Lamar Hunt U.S. Open Cup final was a soccer match played on September 25, 2024, between Los Angeles FC and Sporting Kansas City, both from Major League Soccer. It determined the winner of the 109th edition of the Lamar Hunt U.S. Open Cup. The tournament is the oldest cup competition in U.S. soccer, which is open to amateur and professional soccer teams affiliated with the United States Soccer Federation. The match was won 3–1 in extra time by Los Angeles FC, who earned their first U.S. Open Cup championship.

Los Angeles FC hosted the match at BMO Stadium in Los Angeles, California, and made their debut in a U.S. Open Cup final. It was the team's fifth major tournament final; since their MLS Cup 2022 victory, they had lost four consecutive finals across all competitions. Sporting Kansas City had won four previous editions of the U.S. Open Cup and sought to become the first MLS team to earn a fifth Open Cup title. Both finalists qualified for the 2025 CONCACAF Champions Cup, as Los Angeles FC had already qualified as the 2024 Leagues Cup runners-up.

The Dewar Cup Trophy was presented by three members of the Los Angeles Kickers, an amateur team that won the 1958 and 1964 editions of the tournament. Los Angeles FC became the fourth team from the Los Angeles area to win the U.S. Open Cup, following the Kickers, Maccabee Los Angeles, and LA Galaxy.

== Match ==
=== Details ===
September 25, 2024
7:30 pm PDT

| Los Angeles FC (California) | 3–1 (a.e.t.) | Sporting Kansas City |
|---|---|---|
| Giroud 53'; Campos 102'; Kamara 109' | Reports: USSF; MLS | Thommy 60' |

BMO Stadium, Los Angeles, California
Attendance: 22,214
Referee: Armando Villarreal

Los Angeles FC
Sporting Kansas City

| GK | 1 | (France) Hugo Lloris |
| DF | 4 | (Colombia) Eddie Segura | (yellow card) 64' | (substituted off) 67' |
| DF | 25 | (Luxembourg) Maxime Chanot |
| DF | 33 | (United States) Aaron Long (c) | | (substituted off) 87' |
| MF | 14 | (Spain) Sergi Palencia |
| MF | 11 | (United States) Timothy Tillman | | (substituted off) 112' |
| MF | 8 | (England) Lewis O'Brien | | (substituted off) 87' |
| MF | 24 | (United States) Ryan Hollingshead | (yellow card) 92' |
| FW | 19 | (Poland) Mateusz Bogusz |
| FW | 9 | (France) Olivier Giroud | (yellow card) 56' | (substituted off) 67' |
| FW | 99 | (Gabon) Denis Bouanga |
Substitutions:
| GK | 12 | (Canada) Thomas Hasal |
| DF | 2 | (Mexico) Omar Campos | (yellow card) 72' | (substituted on) 67' |
| DF | 5 | (Brazil) Marlon | | (substituted on) 112' |
| MF | 6 | (Spain) Ilie Sánchez | | (substituted on) 87' |
| FW | 13 | (Uruguay) Cristian Olivera | | (substituted on) 67' |
| FW | 23 | (Sierra Leone) Kei Kamara | | (substituted on) 87' |
| FW | 30 | (Venezuela) David Martínez |
Manager:
(United States) Steve Cherundolo

| GK | 29 | (United States) Tim Melia |
| DF | 11 | (United States) Khiry Shelton |
| DF | 19 | (United States) Robert Castellanos |
| DF | 4 | (Germany) Robert Voloder |
| DF | 18 | (Belgium) Logan Ndenbe | | (substituted off) 82' |
| MF | 7 | (Scotland) Johnny Russell (c) | (yellow card) 43' |
| MF | 22 | (Canada) Zorhan Bassong | (yellow card) 58' | (substituted off) 105' |
| MF | 17 | (United States) Jake Davis | | (substituted off) 105' |
| MF | 10 | (Hungary) Dániel Sallói | | (substituted off) 82' |
| MF | 26 | (Germany) Erik Thommy | | (substituted off) 112' |
| FW | 9 | (Mexico) Alan Pulido |
Substitutions:
| GK | 1 | (United States) John Pulskamp |
| DF | 5 | (Colombia) Daniel Rosero |
| MF | 8 | (United States) Memo Rodríguez | (yellow card) 119' | (substituted on) 105' |
| MF | 14 | (Germany) Tim Leibold | | (substituted on) 82' |
| MF | 54 | (France) Rémi Walter | | (substituted on) 105' |
| FW | 23 | (Nigeria) William Agada | | (substituted on) 82' |
| FW | 30 | (Canada) Stephen Afrifa | | (substituted on) 112' |
Manager:
(United States) Peter Vermes
