= 2025 Sporting Kansas City season =

Sporting Kansas City
2025 season
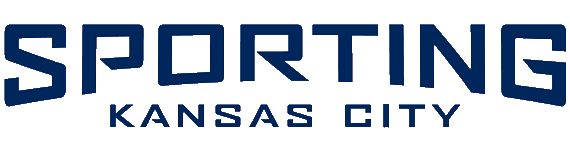
- Owner: Sporting Club
- Head coach: Peter Vermes (until March 31); Kerry Zavagnin (interim, from March 31)
- Stadium: Children's Mercy Park
- MLS: Conference: 15th Overall: 27th
- MLS Cup playoffs: Did not qualify
- U.S. Open Cup: Did not enter
- CONCACAF Champions Cup: Round one
- Top goalscorer: League: Dejan Joveljić (18); All: Dejan Joveljić (18)
- Average home league attendance: 16,604
Home colors	Away colors

The 2025 Sporting Kansas City season was the 30th season of the team's existence in Major League Soccer (MLS) and the 15th year played under the Sporting Kansas City moniker. The team began their season with a CONCACAF Champions Cup match against Inter Miami CF on February 18, 2025. They were eliminated in the first round of the competition. After five losses in their first six MLS matches, Sporting Kansas City fired head coach Peter Vermes on March 31 after 15 seasons with the club. He was replaced by assistant coach Kerry Zavagnin as the interim head coach.

Due to their participation in the Champions Cup, Sporting Kansas City did not play in the 2025 U.S. Open Cup. They instead sent Sporting Kansas City II to play in the Open Cup alongside several other MLS Next Pro teams.

== Roster ==
As of February 22, 2025

Note: Flags indicate national team as defined under FIFA eligibility rules; some limited exceptions apply. Players may hold more than one non-FIFA nationality.

No.	Pos.	Nation	Player
1	GK	USA	John Pulskamp
2	DF	USA	Ian James
3	DF	USA	Andrew Brody
4	DF	GER	Robert Voloder
5	DF	COL	Daniel Rosero
6	MF	SRB	Nemanja Radoja
8	MF	USA	Memo Rodríguez
9	FW	SRB	Dejan Joveljić
10	FW	HUN	Dániel Sallói
11	FW	USA	Khiry Shelton
12	GK	USA	Jack Kortkamp
13	FW	USA	Mason Toye
14	DF	GER	Tim Leibold

No.	Pos.	Nation	Player
15	DF	USA	Jansen Miller
16	MF	USA	Jacob Bartlett
17	DF	USA	Jake Davis
18	DF	BEL	Logan Ndenbe
21	MF	ESP	Manu García
22	DF	CAN	Zorhan Bassong
23	FW	NGR	William Agada
24	DF	ESP	Joaquín Fernández
26	MF	GER	Erik Thommy
30	FW	CAN	Stephen Afrifa
36	GK	USA	Ryan Schewe
93	FW	RUS	Shapi Suleymanov

== Exhibitions ==
=== Preseason ===
Sporting Kansas City released their preseason schedule and roster on January 13, 2025.

==== Match results ====
January 18 1	FIU Panthers	1–0	Sporting Kansas City	Miami, Florida
10:00 AM CST	35'	Report
Note: Played as two 30-minute halves.

January 25 2	Chicago Fire FC	2–0	Sporting Kansas City	Palm Beach Gardens, Florida
11:00 AM CST	Zinckernagel 17'; Oregel 74'	Report		Stadium: The Gardens North County District Park

January 29 3	Charlotte FC	3–2	Sporting Kansas City	Miami, Florida
10:00 AM CST	Agyemang 52', 56'; Cambridge 86' (pen.)	Report	Toye 33'; Barlett 59' (pen.)	Stadium: FIU Soccer Stadium

February 5 4	New York City FC	0–0	Sporting Kansas City	Indio, California
5:00 PM CST		Report		Stadium: Empire Polo Club

February 9 5	Minnesota United FC	6–0	Sporting Kansas City	Indio, California
1:30 PM CST	Oluwaseyi 10', 24'; Pereyra 12'; Rosales 18'; Yeboah 45', 58'	Report		Stadium: Empire Polo Club

February 12 6	Las Vegas Lights FC	0–0	Sporting Kansas City	Indio, California
1:00 PM CST		Report		Stadium: Empire Polo Club

== Competitive ==
=== Major League Soccer ===
==== Standings ====
===== Western Conference =====
MLS Western Conference table (2025)
Pos	Team	Pld	W	L	T	GF	GA	GD	Pts
11	Colorado Rapids	34	11	15	8	44	56	−12	41
12	Houston Dynamo FC	34	9	15	10	43	56	−13	37
13	St. Louis City SC	34	8	18	8	44	58	−14	32
14	LA Galaxy	34	7	18	9	46	66	−20	30
15	Sporting Kansas City	34	7	20	7	46	70	−24	28

Source: MLS
Rules for classification: 1) points; 2) total wins; 3) total goal differential; 4) total goals scored; 5) fewer disciplinary points; 6) away goal differential; 7) away goals scored; 8) home goals differential; 9) home goals scored; 10) coin toss (2 clubs tied) or drawing of lots (≥3 clubs tied)

===== Overall table =====
Overall MLS standings table (2025)
Pos	Team	Pld	W	L	T	GF	GA	GD	Pts	Qualification
25	Toronto FC	34	6	14	14	37	44	−7	32	
26	LA Galaxy	34	7	18	9	46	66	−20	30	Qualification for the CONCACAF Champions Cup round one (Note: As third place of Leagues Cup)
27	Sporting Kansas City	34	7	20	7	46	70	−24	28	
28	CF Montréal	34	6	18	10	34	60	−26	28	
29	Atlanta United FC	34	5	16	13	38	63	−25	28	

Source: MLS
Rules for classification: 1) points; 2) total wins; 3) total goal differential; 4) total goals scored; 5) fewer disciplinary points; 6) away goal differential; 7) away goals scored; 8) home goals differential; 9) home goals scored; 10) coin toss (2 clubs tied) or drawing of lots (≥3 clubs tied)

==== Match results ====
February 22 1	Austin FC	1–0	Sporting Kansas City	Austin, Texas
7:30 PM CST	Desler (yellow card) 36'; Sánchez (yellow card) 58'; Vázquez (yellow card) 62'; Bukari 76'	Report	Fernández (yellow card) 35'; Radoja (yellow card) 60'; Joveljić (yellow card) 85'; Davis (yellow card) 90+3'	Stadium: Q2 Stadium; Attendance: 20,738; Referee: Chris Penso

March 1 2	Sporting Kansas City	1–2	San Jose Earthquakes	Kansas City, Kansas
7:30 PM CST	Leibold (yellow card) 5'; Bartlett (yellow card) 16'; Joveljić 27' (pen.); Davis (yellow card) 45'; Radoja (yellow card) 67'	Report	Arango 3'; Martínez 19'; López (yellow card) 45+5' (yellow-red card) 52'	Stadium: Children's Mercy Park; Attendance: 16,277; Referee: Sergii Boiko

March 8 3	D.C. United	2–1	Sporting Kansas City	Washington, D.C.
6:30 PM CST	Enow (yellow card) 31'; Peglow (yellow card) 38'; Benteke 60' (pen.), (yellow card) 76'; Kijima 68'; Kim Joon-Hong (yellow card) 90'; MacNaughton (yellow card) 90+8'; Herrera (yellow card) 90+9'	Report	Rosero (yellow card) 21'; Fernández (yellow card) 40'; Miller (yellow card) 52'; Thommy 53'; Pulskamp (yellow card) 82'	Stadium: Audi Field; Attendance: 15,183; Referee: Rosendo Mendoza

March 15 4	Sporting Kansas City	3–3	Minnesota United FC	Kansas City, Kansas
7:00 PM CDT	Leibold (yellow card) 64'; Sallói 68'; Duggan 72' (o.g.); Joveljić 80'	Report	Oluwaseyi (yellow card) 6', (goal) 31', 46'; Dotson 15'	Stadium: Children's Mercy Park; Attendance: 14,867; Referee: Joe Dickerson

March 22 5	Sporting Kansas City	0–2	Los Angeles FC	Kansas City, Kansas
7:30 PM CDT	Ndenbe (yellow card) 11'; Rodríguez (yellow card) 24'; Radoja (yellow card) 65'	Report	Martínez 18'; Long 54'; Palencia (yellow card) 60'; Yeboah (yellow card) 90+2'	Stadium: Children's Mercy Park; Attendance: 15,263; Referee: Ismir Pekmic

March 29 6	FC Dallas	2–1	Sporting Kansas City	Frisco, Texas
7:30 PM CDT	Moore (yellow card) 24'; Acosta 37'; Chú 39'; Ramiro (yellow card) 69'	Report	Bartlett (yellow card) 25'; Sallói 32'	Stadium: Toyota Stadium; Attendance: 11,004; Referee: Fotis Bazakos

April 5 7	Sporting Kansas City	2–0	St. Louis City SC	Kansas City, Kansas
7:30 PM CDT	Bartlett (yellow card) 39'; Joveljić 71', 88'	Report	Wallem (yellow card) 28'; Ostrák (yellow card) 78'	Stadium: Children's Mercy Park; Attendance: 18,116; Referee: Tori Penso

April 13 8	Sporting Kansas City	2–4	Portland Timbers	Kansas City, Kansas
1:00 PM CDT	Suleymanov 16'; Joveljić 33' (pen.); Fernández (yellow card) 45+6'	Report	Ayala 10'; Smith (yellow card) 22'; Kelsy 26', 49'; Antony (yellow card) 28'; Miller 54' (o.g.); Chará (yellow card) 58'; Lassiter (yellow card) 78'	Stadium: Children's Mercy Park; Attendance: 17,898; Referee: Pierre-Luc Lauziere

April 19 9	San Jose Earthquakes	3–5	Sporting Kansas City	San Jose, California
9:30 PM CDT	Martínez 30'; Kaye (yellow card) 36'; Arango 42', 90+4' (pen.); Rodrigues (yellow card) 52'	Report	Ndenbe 18', (yellow card) 41'; Sallói 20', 73'; García 24'; Thommy 85'; Pulskamp (yellow card) 90+2'	Stadium: PayPal Park; Attendance: 14,147; Referee: Joe Dickerson

April 26 10	FC Cincinnati	2–1	Sporting Kansas City	Cincinnati, Ohio
2:30 PM CDT	Anunga (yellow card) 17'; Denkey 43', 78', (yellow card) 79'	Report	Joveljić (yellow card) 65'; Bassong 89'	Stadium: TQL Stadium; Attendance: 25,513; Referee: Allen Chapman

May 4 11	Sporting Kansas City	1–0	LA Galaxy	Kansas City, Kansas
7:00 PM CDT	Yoshida 13' (o.g.); Leibold (yellow card) 42'	Report	Paintsil (yellow card) 38'; Garcés (yellow card) 45+2'	Stadium: Children's Mercy Park; Attendance: 17,902; Referee: Chris Penso

May 10 12	Portland Timbers	1–0	Sporting Kansas City	Portland, Oregon
9:30 PM CDT	Moreno 10'; Bravo (yellow card) 67'	Report	Suleymanov (yellow card) 73'; Davis (yellow card) 74'	Stadium: Providence Park; Attendance: 21,287; Referee: Ricardo Fierro

May 14 13	St. Louis City SC	2–2	Sporting Kansas City	St. Louis, Missouri
7:30 PM CDT	Pompeu 15'; Teuchert 44'; Zalinsky (yellow card) 85'	Report	Voloder (yellow card) 31'; Sallói (yellow card) 45+2'; Bassong (yellow card) 50'; Leibold 71'; Joveljić 77'	Stadium: Energizer Park; Attendance: 22,423; Referee: Lukasz Szpala

May 17 14	San Diego FC	0–0	Sporting Kansas City	San Diego, California
9:30 PM CDT	Godoy (yellow card) 21'; Bombino (yellow card) 37'	Report	Miller (yellow card) 9'; Bassong (yellow card) 46'; García (yellow card) 68'	Stadium: Snapdragon Stadium; Attendance: 25,233; Referee: Victor Rivas

May 24 15	Sporting Kansas City	3–3	New England Revolution	Kansas City, Kansas
7:30 PM CDT	Sallói 53'; Joveljić 59' (pen.); García 61', (yellow card) 68'; Bartlett (yellow card) 76'	Report	Chancalay 14'; Bartlett 23' (o.g.); Fofana (yellow card) 57'; Urruti 84'	Stadium: Children's Mercy Park; Attendance: 17,180; Referee: Sergii Boiko

May 31 17	Houston Dynamo FC	1–3	Sporting Kansas City	Houston, Texas
7:30 PM CDT	Kowalczyk 13'; Raines (yellow card) 45+1'; Dorsey (yellow card) 84'; Andrade (yellow card) 86'	Report	Joveljić 45+3', 52'; Bassong (yellow card) 76'; Sallói (yellow card) 82'; Muñóz 88'	Stadium: Shell Energy Stadium; Attendance: 17,852; Referee: Jair Marrufo

June 8 16	Los Angeles FC	3–1	Sporting Kansas City	Los Angeles, California
8:00 PM CDT	Hollingshead (yellow card) 27'; Segura 45+1'; Bouanga 59' (pen.); Amaya (yellow card) 88'; Giroud 90+3'	Report	Joveljić 39'; Davis (yellow card) 67'	Stadium: BMO Stadium; Attendance: 17,031; Referee: Ricardo Montero
Note: Match moved from May 28 due to Los Angeles FC's participation in the 2025 FIFA Club World Cup playoff match.

June 14 18	Sporting Kansas City	2–4	FC Dallas	Kansas City, Kansas
7:30 PM CDT	Suleymanov 8'; Shelton (yellow card) 45+3' (red card) 62'; Muñóz 90+1'; Fernández (yellow card) 90+8'; Sallói (yellow card) 90+11'; Rodríguez (yellow card) 90+11'; García (yellow card) 90+11'	Report	Musa 11', (yellow card) 45+5'; Julio (yellow card) 45+7'; Pedrinho (yellow card) 49'; Acosta 59' (pen.), 82', (yellow card) 64'; Kamungo 69'	Stadium: Children's Mercy Park; Attendance: 17,144; Referee: Sergii Demianchuk

June 25 19	Sporting Kansas City	2–1	Charlotte FC	Kansas City, Kansas
7:30 PM CDT	Fernández (yellow card) 66'; Toye 90+3'; Joveljić 90+6'	Report	Toklomati 34'; Williamson (yellow card) 55'; Zaha (yellow card) 63'	Stadium: Children's Mercy Park; Attendance: 16,223; Referee: Rubiel Vazquez

June 28 20	Sporting Kansas City	1–1	Real Salt Lake	Kansas City, Kansas
7:30 PM CDT	Sallói (yellow card) 24'; Leibold (yellow card) 35'; Bartlett (yellow card) 43'; Rodríguez (yellow card) 49'; Thommy 59'; Davis (yellow card) 69' (yellow-red card) 82'	Report	Russell 45+1'; Palacio (yellow card) 52'; Ruiz (yellow card) 74'	Stadium: Children's Mercy Park; Attendance: 17,050; Referee: Ismir Pekmic

July 4 21	Colorado Rapids	1–2	Sporting Kansas City	Commerce City, Colorado
8:30 PM CDT	Navarro 89' (pen.)	Report	Joveljić 4'; Fernández (yellow card) 17'; García (yellow card) 48'; Leibold (yellow card) 52'; Thommy 53'; Bartlett (yellow card) 64'	Stadium: Dick's Sporting Goods Park; Attendance: 17,576; Referee: Filip Dujic

July 12 22	Sporting Kansas City	2–3	Seattle Sounders FC	Kansas City, Kansas
7:30 PM CDT	Suleymanov (yellow card) 36'; Joveljić 67' (pen.); García (yellow card) 78'; Muñóz 90+6' (pen.)	Report	Morris 15'; Rusnák 27' (pen.), (yellow card) 82'; Bell (yellow card) 40'; C. Roldan (yellow card) 45+6'; Ferreira 45+8'; Vargas (yellow card) 81'; Nouhou (red card) 90+4'	Stadium: Children's Mercy Park; Attendance: 16,717; Referee: Elijio Arreguin

July 19 23	Sporting Kansas City	1–1	New York City FC	Kansas City, Kansas
7:30 PM CDT	Bassong (yellow card) 47'; Bartlett (yellow card) 66'; Sallói 74'	Report	Perea 22'	Stadium: Children's Mercy Park; Attendance: 16,987; Referee: Timothy Ford

July 26 24	Vancouver Whitecaps FC	3–0	Sporting Kansas City	Vancouver, British Columbia
9:30 PM CDT	Sabbi (yellow card) 3', (goal) 35'; Ngando 43'; Laborda 87'	Report	Joveljić (yellow card) 27'; Leibold (yellow card) 52'	Stadium: BC Place; Attendance: 20,719; Referee: Lukasz Szpala

August 9 25	Sporting Kansas City	0–2	San Diego FC	Kansas City, Kansas
7:30 PM CDT	García (yellow card) 65'	Report	Lozano 23'; Dreyer 70'	Stadium: Children's Mercy Park; Attendance: 16,579; Referee: Pierre-Luc Lauziere

August 16 26	Orlando City SC	3–1	Sporting Kansas City	Orlando, Florida
6:30 PM CDT	Spicer 2'; Enrique 76'; Rodríguez 77'	Report	Joveljić 25'	Stadium: Inter&Co Stadium; Attendance: 20,026; Referee: Ricardo Montero

August 24 27	Seattle Sounders FC	5–2	Sporting Kansas City	Seattle, Washington
8:00 PM CDT	Kossa-Rienzi 11'; Musovski 45+1', 50', 75' (pen.); Brunell 61'	Report	Toye 36'; Baker 53' (o.g.); Afrifa (yellow card) 85'	Stadium: Lumen Field; Attendance: 30,184; Referee: Chris Penso

August 30 28	Sporting Kansas City	4–2	Colorado Rapids	Kansas City, Kansas
7:30 PM CDT	Joveljić 4', 81'; Bassong (yellow card) 16'; James (yellow card) 52'; Sallói 73'; Toye 75'	Report	Navarro 22'; Rosenberry 31'	Stadium: Children's Mercy Park; Attendance: 16,262; Referee: Fotis Bazakos

September 7 29	Sporting Kansas City	1–2	Austin FC	Kansas City, Kansas
6:00 PM CDT	Joveljić 16' (pen.); Bartlett (yellow card) 74'	Report	Desler (yellow card) 19'; Đorđević (yellow card) 29'; Wolff 37'; Fodrey 82'; Kolmanič (yellow card) 86'	Stadium: Children's Mercy Park; Attendance: 15,787; Referee: Sergii Boiko

September 13 30	Real Salt Lake	2–1	Sporting Kansas City	Sandy, Utah
8:30 PM CDT	Luna 40'; Cruz (yellow card) 59'; Katranis 62'	Report	Vera 71' (o.g.); Joveljić (yellow card) 90+4'	Stadium: America First Field; Attendance: 20,172; Referee: Drew Fischer

September 20 31	Sporting Kansas City	0–2	Vancouver Whitecaps FC	Kansas City, Kansas
7:30 PM CDT	Bassong (yellow card) 44'; Montes (yellow card) 82'	Report	Ocampo 2', (yellow card) 53'; Cubas (yellow card) 10'; Cabrera 43'; Halbouni (yellow card) 57'; Rios (yellow card) 66'; Berhalter (yellow card) 90+6'	Stadium: Children's Mercy Park; Attendance: 15,026; Referee: Tori Penso

September 27 32	LA Galaxy	4–1	Sporting Kansas City	Carson, California
9:30 PM CDT	Paintsil 4', 25', 43'; Fagúndez 60'; Yamane (yellow card) 87'; Garcés (yellow card) 90+1'	Report	Joveljić 28'; Suleymanov (red card) 83'	Stadium: Dick's Sporting Goods Park; Attendance: 17,903; Referee: Fotis Bazakos

October 4 33	Minnesota United FC	3–0	Sporting Kansas City	Saint Paul, Minnesota
7:30 PM CDT	Markanich 25', 63'; Pereyra 59'	Report	Bassong (yellow card) 53'; Davis (yellow card) 90'	Stadium: Allianz Field; Attendance: 19,784; Referee: Natalie Simon

October 18 34	Sporting Kansas City	0–0	Houston Dynamo FC	Kansas City, Kansas
8:00 PM CDT	Bassong (yellow card) 44'; Pulskamp (yellow card) 59'	Report	Antônio Carlos (yellow card) 12'; Holmes (yellow card) 20'; Ennali (yellow card) 87'; Urso (yellow card) 89'	Stadium: Children's Mercy Park; Attendance: 16,983; Referee: Nabil Bensalah

=== U.S. Open Cup ===
Sporting Kansas City did not send their main squad to the U.S. Open Cup, but sent Sporting Kansas City II instead.

=== CONCACAF Champions Cup ===
==== Round One ====
February 19 First leg	Sporting Kansas City (United States)	0–1	(United States) Inter Miami CF	Kansas City, Kansas
7:00 PM CST	García (yellow card) 74'	Report	Messi 56'; Redondo (yellow card) 80'	Stadium: Children's Mercy Park; Attendance: 15,178; Referee: Marco Ortiz
Note: Due to expected winter weather issues in the Kansas City metropolitan area, the game was pushed back a day.

February 25 Second leg	Inter Miami CF (United States)	3–1 (4–1 agg.)	(United States) Sporting Kansas City	Fort Lauderdale, Florida
7:00 PM CST	Messi 19'; Allende 45+1'; Suárez 45+3'	Report	Rodríguez 63'	Stadium: Chase Stadium; Attendance: 18,280; Referee: Ismael Cornejo
Note: Inter Miami CF won 4–1 on aggregate.

=== 2025 Leagues Cup ===
Sporting Kansas City did not qualify for the 2025 Leagues Cup as they were not one of the top 9 teams in the Western Conference for the 2024 season.
