= 2022 Sporting Kansas City season =

Sporting Kansas City
2022 season
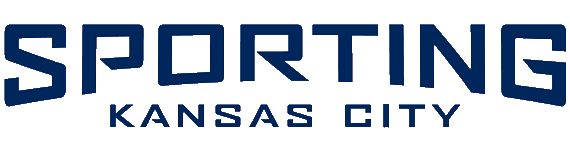
- Owner: Sporting Club
- Head coach: Peter Vermes
- Stadium: Children's Mercy Park
- MLS: Conference: 12th Overall: 22nd
- Playoffs: Did not qualify
- U.S. Open Cup: Semi-finals
- Highest home attendance: League/All: 20,142 (7/23 vs. LAFC)
- Lowest home attendance: League: 17,233 (5/18 vs. COL); All: 14,913 (5/25 vs. HOU, USOC)
- Average home league attendance: 18,441
- Biggest win: SKC 4–1 POR (8/21)
- Biggest defeat: POR 7–2 SKC (5/14)

The 2022 Sporting Kansas City season was the 27th season of the team's existence in Major League Soccer and the 12th year played under the Sporting Kansas City moniker.

== Player movement ==
=== In ===
Per Major League Soccer and club policies terms of the deals do not get disclosed.

Date	Player	Position	Previous club	Fee/notes	Ref
December 20, 2021	(United States) Ben Sweat	DF	(United States) Austin FC	Free agent	
January 14, 2022	(Belgium) Logan Ndenbe	DF	(France) Guingamp	U22 initiative transfer	
January 14, 2022	(United States) Kortne Ford	DF	(United States) San Antonio FC		
January 19, 2022	(Germany) Robert Voloder	DF	(Slovenia) NK Maribor	U22 initiative transfer	
January 24, 2022	(Cyprus) Marinos Tzionis	W	(Cyprus) Omonia Nicosia	U22 initiative transfer	
February 15, 2022	(Montenegro) Nikola Vujnovic	FW	(Serbia) FK Voždovac	Loan	
June 23, 2022	(Nigeria) William Agada	FW	(Israel) Hapoel Jerusalem	Transfer	
June 23, 2022	(Germany) Eric Thommy	MF	(Germany) VfB Stuttgart	Free Transfer	

==== Draft picks ====
Draft picks are not automatically signed to the team roster. Only trades involving draft picks and executed after the start of 2022 MLS SuperDraft will be listed in the notes.

Round	Pick Number	Player	Position	School	Ref
1	22	(United States) Esai Easley	DF	Grand Canyon	
2	50	(United States) Brett St. Martin	DF	Maryland	

=== Out ===
Date	Player	Position	Destination club	Notes	Ref
November 30, 2021	(United States) Amadou Dia	DF	(United States) Louisville City	Contract option declined	
November 30, 2021	(United States) Wilson Harris	FW	(United States) Louisville City	Contract option declined	
November 30, 2021	(Portugal) Luís Martins	DF	(Canada) Vancouver Whitecaps FC	Contract option declined	
November 30, 2021	(Croatia) Roberto Punčec	DF	(Bulgaria) Botev Plovdiv	Contract option declined	
November 30, 2021	(Spain) Ilie Sánchez	MF	(United States) Los Angeles FC	Contract option declined	
November 30, 2021	(United States) Graham Smith	DF/MF	(United States) Memphis 901 FC	Contract expired	
November 30, 2021	(United States) Brooks Thompson	GK	(United States) Philadelphia Union II	Contract option declined	
December 12, 2021	(United States) Jaylin Lindsey	DF	(United States) Charlotte FC	2021 MLS Expansion Draft pick	
April 12, 2022	(Italy) José Mauri	MF	(Argentina) Sarmiento	Contract terminated	

== Non-competitive ==
=== Preseason exhibitions ===
January 21	United States	v	Sporting Kansas City	Phoenix, AZ
12:00 CST
Note: Result not made public.

January 29	Sporting Kansas City	0–0	Colorado Rapids	Tucson, AZ
18:00 CST		Report		Stadium: Kino North Stadium

February 3	Sporting Kansas City	2–2	Portland Timbers	Chandler, AZ
13:00 CST	Isimat-Mirin 18'; Russell 34'; Ndenbe (yellow card) 48'; Freeman (yellow card) 57'; Hernández (yellow card) 90'	SKC Tweet; POR Report	Quinn 51'; McGraw (yellow card) 79'; Mora 90+1'	Stadium: Phoenix Rising Soccer Complex at Wild Horse Pass

February 9	El Paso Locomotive	v	Sporting Kansas City	Chandler, AZ
13:00 CST				Stadium: Phoenix Rising Soccer Complex at Wild Horse Pass
Note: Match was canceled.

February 12	Phoenix Rising	2–1	Sporting Kansas City	Chandler, AZ
13:00 CST	Moar 28'; Rodríguez 81' (pen.)	Report	Sallói 12'	Stadium: Phoenix Rising Soccer Complex at Wild Horse Pass

February 19	Sporting Kansas City	1–1	Toronto FC	Austin, TX
16:00 CST	Sallói 73'	Report	Mbongue 89'

== Competitive ==
=== MLS ===
==== Standings ====
===== Western Conference =====
Pos	Team	Pld	W	L	T	GF	GA	GD	Pts
10	Colorado Rapids	34	11	13	10	46	57	−11	43
11	Seattle Sounders FC	34	12	17	5	47	46	+1	41
12	Sporting Kansas City	34	11	16	7	42	54	−12	40
13	Houston Dynamo FC	34	10	18	6	43	56	−13	36
14	San Jose Earthquakes	34	8	15	11	52	69	−17	35

Source: MLS
Rules for classification: 1) points; 2) total wins; 3) total goal differential; 4) total goals scored; 5) fewer disciplinary points; 6) away goal differential; 7) away goals scored; 8) home goals differential; 9) home goals scored; 10) coin toss (2 clubs tied) or drawing of lots (≥3 clubs tied)

===== Overall table =====
Pos	Team	Pld	W	L	T	GF	GA	GD	Pts
20	New England Revolution	34	10	12	12	47	50	−3	42
21	Seattle Sounders FC	34	12	17	5	47	46	+1	41
22	Sporting Kansas City	34	11	16	7	42	54	−12	40
23	Atlanta United FC	34	10	14	10	48	54	−6	40
24	Chicago Fire FC	34	10	15	9	39	48	−9	39

Source: MLS
Rules for classification: 1) points; 2) total wins; 3) total goal differential; 4) total goals scored; 5) fewer disciplinary points; 6) away goal differential; 7) away goals scored; 8) home goals differential; 9) home goals scored; 10) coin toss (2 clubs tied) or drawing of lots (≥3 clubs tied)

==== Match results ====
February 27 1	Atlanta United FC	3–1	Sporting Kansas City	Atlanta, Georgia
2:00 PM CST	Robinson (yellow card) 3'; Alonso (yellow card) 11'; Luiz Araújo 20'; Gutman (yellow card) 22'; Dwyer 45+3'; Wiley 89'	Report	Mauri (yellow card) 58'; Fontàs (yellow card) 79'; Sallói 85'	Stadium: Mercedes-Benz Stadium; Attendance: 67,523; Referee: Ted Unkel

March 5 2	Sporting Kansas City	1–0	Houston Dynamo FC	Kansas City, Kansas
2:30 PM CST	Walter 60'; Espinoza (yellow card) 83'	Report	Cerén (yellow card) 55'; Quintero (yellow card) 86'; Vera (yellow card) 90+2'	Stadium: Children's Mercy Park; Attendance: 18,872; Referee: Victor Rivas

March 12 3	Colorado Rapids	2–0	Sporting Kansas City	Commerce City, Colorado
8:00 PM CST	Rubio 21'; Kaye 51'; Moor (yellow card) 62'	Report	Isimat-Mirin (yellow card) 29'; Duke (yellow card) 56'	Stadium: Dick's Sporting Goods Park; Attendance: 12,387; Referee: Alex Chilowicz

March 19 4	Chicago Fire FC	3–1	Sporting Kansas City	Chicago, Illinois
5:00 PM CST	Przybyłko 30', 82'; Herbers (yellow card) 37'; Shaqiri 50' (pen.), (yellow card) 74'	Report	Fontàs (yellow card) 35'; Zusi (yellow card) 53'; Espinoza 56'	Stadium: Soldier Field; Attendance: 9,352; Referee: Timothy Ford

March 26 5	Sporting Kansas City	1–0	Real Salt Lake	Kansas City, Kansas
7:00 PM CDT	Espinoza (yellow card) 40'; Sweat (yellow card) 45+'; Walter (yellow card) 51'; Russell 81'; Duke (yellow card) 90+'	Report	Löeffelsend (yellow card) 7'; Brody (yellow card) 29'	Stadium: Children's Mercy Park; Attendance: 19,107; Referee: Joseph Dickerson

April 2 6	Vancouver Whitecaps FC	1–0	Sporting Kansas City	Vancouver, British Columbia
7:00 PM CDT	Teibert (yellow card) 37'; Berhalter (yellow card) 45'; Cavallini (yellow card) 60'; Raposo 73'; Godinho (yellow card) 90+4'	Report		Stadium: BC Place; Attendance: 16,772; Referee: Fotis Bazakos

April 9 7	Sporting Kansas City	1–2	Nashville SC	Kansas City, Kansas
7:30 PM CDT	Duke (yellow card) 17'; Walter 25'; Espinoza (yellow card) 52'; Hernández (yellow card) 63'	Report	Romney 51'; Sapong 68'; Washington (yellow card) 79'	Stadium: Children's Mercy Park; Attendance: 18,852; Referee: Ismail Elfath

April 17 8	Los Angeles FC	3–1	Sporting Kansas City	Los Angeles, California
3:00 PM CDT	Murillo (yellow card) 8'; Fall (yellow card) 25'; Arango 44'; Palacios (yellow card) 51'; Tajouri-Shradi 70'; Cifuentes 78'	Report	Espinoza (yellow card) 6'; Palacios 28' (o.g.); Russell (yellow card) 43'; Isimat-Mirin (yellow card) 80'	Stadium: Banc of California Stadium; Attendance: 22,097; Referee: Armando Villarreal

April 23 9	Sporting Kansas City	0–0	Columbus Crew	Kansas City, Kansas
7:30 PM CDT		Report	Santos (yellow card) 45+1'; Mensah (yellow card) 90+2'	Stadium: Children's Mercy Park; Attendance: 18,483; Referee: Rosendo Mendoza

April 30 10	Sporting Kansas City	2–2	FC Dallas	Kansas City, Kansas
7:30 PM CDT	Russell 22' (pen.), (yellow card) 50'; Walter (yellow card) 27'; Ford (yellow card) 34'; Sallói 77'	Report	Ntsabeleng (yellow card) 87'; Velasco 36', (yellow card) 53'; Ferreira 42', (yellow card) 62'; Twumasi (yellow card) 44'; Servania (yellow card) 63' (yellow-red card) 67'; Paes (yellow card) 90+4'	Stadium: Children's Mercy Park; Attendance: 17,334; Referee: Nima Saghafi

May 7 11	New York City FC	0–0	Sporting Kansas City	New York, New York
8:00 PM CDT	Acevedo (yellow card) 64'	Report	Ndenbe (yellow card) 45'; Ford (yellow card) 89'	Stadium: Citi Field; Attendance: 15,031; Referee: Timothy Ford

May 14 12	Portland Timbers	7–2	Sporting Kansas City	Portland, Oregon
7:00 PM PDT	Tuiloma 12', (yellow card) 72'; Blanco 46', 52'; Fogaça 56', 69'; Van Rankin (yellow card) 64' (yellow-red card) 74'; D. Chará (yellow card) 86'; Loría 88'; Moreno 90+2'	Report	Espinoza (yellow card) 18'; Voloder (yellow card) 35' (yellow-red card) 78'; Russell 57'; Tzionis 75'	Stadium: Providence Park; Attendance: 23,503; Referee: Victor Rivas

May 18 13	Sporting Kansas City	2–1	Colorado Rapids	Kansas City, Kansas
7:30 PM CDT	Sallói 24', 50', (red card) 90+9'; Hernández (yellow card) 58'; Ndenbe (yellow card) 79'; Fontàs (red card) 90+6'	Report	Acosta (yellow card) 3'; Esteves 29', (yellow card) 90+3' (yellow-red card) 90+6'; Trusty (yellow card) 78' (yellow-red card) 90+1'; Abubakar (yellow card) 90'; Rubio (yellow card) 90+1'	Stadium: Children's Mercy Park; Attendance: 17,233; Referee: Drew Fischer

May 22 14	San Jose Earthquakes	1–1	Sporting Kansas City	San Jose, California
9:30 PM CDT	Yueill 46'; Marie (yellow card) 88'	Report	Russell 44'; Espinoza (yellow card) 58'; Rosell (yellow card) 74'	Stadium: PayPal Park; Attendance: 14,233; Referee: Pierre-Luc Lauziere

May 28 15	Sporting Kansas City	0–1	Vancouver Whitecaps FC	Kansas City, Kansas
8:00 PM CDT	Ford (yellow card) 13'; Fontàs (yellow card) 44'; Russell (yellow card) 57'	Report	Cavallini 24' (pen.); Berhalter (yellow card) 27'; Gutiérrez (yellow card) 52'	Stadium: Children's Mercy Park; Attendance: 19,206; Referee: Ted Unkel

June 12 16	Sporting Kansas City	1–2	New England Revolution	Kansas City, Kansas
2:00 PM CDT	Ford (yellow card) 34'; Rosell (yellow card) 45+2' (yellow-red card) 48'; Russell 52'	Report	Bou (yellow card) 7', (goal) 30'; Polster (yellow card) 24'; Farrell (yellow card) 50'; Jones (yellow card) 55'; Boateng 87'	Stadium: Children's Mercy Park; Attendance: 18,703; Referee: Chris Penso

June 19 17	Nashville SC	1–2	Sporting Kansas City	Nashville, Tennessee
3:00 PM CDT	Godoy (yellow card) 40'; Loba 63'	Report	Hernández 41'; Zusi 51'; Melia (yellow card) 81'; Russell (yellow card) 86'; Espinoza (yellow card) 89'	Stadium: Geodis Park; Attendance: 29,269; Referee: Victor Rivas

June 25 18	Seattle Sounders FC	3–0	Sporting Kansas City	Seattle, Washington
2:00 PM CDT	Bruin 8'; Morris (yellow card) 64', (goal) 71'; Roldan 76'	Report		Stadium: Lumen Field; Attendance: 33,380; Referee: Alex Chilowicz

July 3 19	Sporting Kansas City	0–1	New York Red Bulls	Kansas City, Kansas
7:00 PM CDT	Fontàs (yellow card) 90'	Report	Long 53'; Harper (yellow card) 57'; S. Nealis (red card) 73'; Tolkin (yellow card) 79'; Amaya (yellow card) 83'	Stadium: Children's Mercy Park; Attendance: 19,065; Referee: Marcos de Oliveira
Note: The match was suspended at the 29' mark due to inclement weather. The match was later resumed at 8:20 PM EDT after the weather was cleared.

July 9 20	CF Montréal	1–2	Sporting Kansas City	Montreal, Quebec
6:30 PM CDT	Quioto 13'; Kwizera (yellow card) 32'	Report	Rosell (yellow card) 27'; Espinoza 29', (yellow card) 61'; Walter 63'; Pierre (yellow card) 77'	Stadium: Saputo Stadium; Attendance: 14,127; Referee: Ismir Pekmic

July 13 21	Minnesota United FC	1–1	Sporting Kansas City	St. Paul, Minnesota
7:00 PM CDT	Trapp (yellow card) 16'; Pulskamp 43' (o.g.); Taylor (yellow card) 53'; Reynoso (yellow card) 76'	Report	Fontàs (yellow card) 47'; Russell 63'	Stadium: Allianz Field; Attendance: 19,657; Referee: Guido Gonzales Jr.

July 17 22	Real Salt Lake	3–0	Sporting Kansas City	Sandy, Utah
8:30 PM CDT	Glad (yellow card) 34'; Córdova 50', (yellow card) 50'; Ruiz 64'; Savarino 71'; Julio (yellow card) 90+3'	Report	Espinoza (yellow card) 24', (red card) 62'; Isimat-Mirin (yellow card) 85'	Stadium: Rio Tinto Stadium; Attendance: 20,132; Referee: Joseph Dickerson

July 23 23	Sporting Kansas City	0–2	Los Angeles FC	Kansas City, Kansas
5:30 PM PT		Report	Acosta (yellow card) 5'; Arango 56'; Vela (yellow card) 71'; Bale 83'; Hollingshead (yellow card) 90+6'	Stadium: Children's Mercy Park; Attendance: 20,142; Referee: Lukasz Szpala

July 30 24	Sporting Kansas City	0–2	Austin FC	Kansas City, Kansas
7:30 PM CT	Duke (yellow card) 39' (yellow-red card) 43'; Sallói (penalty missed) 63'; Sweat (yellow card) 73'	Report	Cascante (yellow card) 25'; Pereira (yellow card) 38'; Urruti (yellow card) 42'; Ring 45+1'; Driussi 90'	Stadium: Children's Mercy Park; Attendance: 17,287; Referee: Fotis Bazakos

August 6 25	Sporting Kansas City	4–2	LA Galaxy	Kansas City, Kansas
7:30 PM CDT	Thommy 10'; Agada 40', 45+5'; Espinoza (yellow card) 56'; Sallói 90+5'	Report	Williams (yellow card) 24'; Gasper (yellow card) 26'; Hernández (yellow card) 63', (goal) 83', 90+2' (pen.)	Stadium: Children's Mercy Park; Attendance: 18,101; Referee: Michael Radchuk

August 13 26	Austin FC	4–3	Sporting Kansas City	Austin, Texas
8:00 PM CDT	Gallagher 27'; Cascante 63'; Gabrielsen (yellow card) 68'; Hoesen 85'; Driussi 90+4', (yellow card) 90+5'	Report	Fontàs 12'; Agada 23', (yellow card) 86'; Russell 40' (pen.); Sallói (yellow card) 88'	Stadium: Q2 Stadium; Attendance: 20.738; Referee: Pierre-Luc Lauziere

August 21 27	Sporting Kansas City	4–1	Portland Timbers	Kansas City, Kansas
6:55 PM CDT	Agada 31', 75'; Fontàs 40'; Thommy 42'; Sweat (yellow card) 78'	Report	McGraw (yellow card) 57'; D. Chará (yellow card) 86'; Blanco 90'	Stadium: Children's Mercy Park; Attendance: 17,348; Referee: Armando Villarreal

August 27 28	Sporting Kansas City	1–0	San Jose Earthquakes	Kansas City, Kansas
6:55 PM CDT	Sallói 10'; Sweat (yellow card) 42'; Agada (yellow card) 45'; Fontàs (yellow card) 88'	Report	Beason (yellow card) 57'; Ågren (yellow card) 90+1'	Stadium: Children's Mercy Park; Attendance: 18,241; Referee: Guido Gonzales Jr.

September 4 29	LA Galaxy	2–2	Sporting Kansas City	Carson, California
5:00 PM PST	Hernández 4', 88' (pen.); Puig (yellow card) 47'	Report	Russell 67' (pen.); Hernández 76'	Stadium: Dignity Health Sports Park; Attendance: 20,104; Referee: Ramy Touchan

September 10 30	Houston Dynamo FC	0–0	Sporting Kansas City	Houston, Texas
7:30 PM CDT	Vera (yellow card) 18' (yellow-red card) 41'; Ferreira (yellow card) 38'; Carrasquilla (yellow card) 90'	Report	Isimat-Mirin (yellow card) 65'; Sallói (yellow card) 88'	Stadium: PNC Stadium; Attendance: 15,169; Referee: Tori Penso

September 13 31	Sporting Kansas City	3–0	D.C. United	Kansas City, Kansas
TBD EDT	Espinoza (yellow card) 29'; Shelton 34'; Voloder 70'; Sallói 87'	Report	Morrison (yellow card) 31'; Benteke (yellow card) 63'; Smith (yellow card) 73'	Stadium: Children's Mercy Park; Attendance: 15,106; Referee: Rosendo Mendoza

September 17 32	Sporting Kansas City	4–1	Minnesota United FC	Kansas City, Kansas
7:30 PM CDT	Boxall 31' (o.g.); Thommy 41'; Agada 45', 81'; Shelton (yellow card) 86'	Report	García 57'; Rosales (yellow card) 84'	Stadium: Children's Mercy Park; Attendance: 19,680; Referee: Marcos de Oliveira

October 2 33	Sporting Kansas City	1–0	Seattle Sounders FC	Kansas City, Kansas
4:00 PM CDT	Thommy (yellow card) 28'; Agada 41'	Report	Arreaga (yellow card) 49'; Atencio (yellow card) 77'	Stadium: Children's Mercy Park; Attendance: 19,439; Referee: Ted Unkel

October 9 34	FC Dallas	2–1	Sporting Kansas City	Frisco, Texas
4:00 PM CDT	Lletget 33'; Cerrillo (yellow card) 46'; Arriola 65'; Twumasi (yellow card) 80'	Report	Zusi 51'; Hernández (yellow card) 76'; Isimat-Mirin (yellow card) 79'	Stadium: Toyota Stadium; Attendance: 19,096; Referee: Victor Rivas

=== U.S. Open Cup ===
May 10 Round of 32	Sporting Kansas City	4–2 (a.e.t.)	(Texas) FC Dallas	Kansas City, Kansas
7:30 PM CDT	Davis (yellow card) 26'; Fontàs (yellow card) 42'; Vujnović 60'; Tzionis 90+8'; Cerrillo 94' (o.g.); Hernández (yellow card) 105+2'; Shelton 113'; Russell (yellow card) 120'	Report	Jara 8'; Munjoma 34'; Maurer (yellow card) 36'; Obrian (yellow card) 43'; Bartlett (yellow card) 63'; Ferreira (yellow card) 90+5'; Martínez (red card) 90+7'	Stadium: Children's Mercy Park; Attendance: 14,922; Referee: Malik Badawi

May 25 Round of 16	Sporting Kansas City	2–1	(Texas) Houston Dynamo FC	Kansas City, Kansas
7:30 PM CDT	Rosell (yellow card) 29'; Russell 52', 73' (pen.); Ford (yellow card) 88'	Report	Cerén (yellow card) 18'; Baird 41'; Quintero (yellow card) 51'; Dorsey (yellow card) 69'	Stadium: Children's Mercy Park; Attendance: 14,913; Referee: Calin Radosav

June 22 Quarter-finals	Sporting Kansas City	6–0	(Nebraska) Union Omaha (USL1)	Kansas City, Kansas
7:30 CDT	Sallói 10', 53'; Ford 37'; Shelton 56'; Hernández 66', 81'	Report	Bawa (yellow card) 71'	Stadium: Children's Mercy Park; Attendance: 18,552; Referee: Brandon Stevis

July 27 Semi-finals	Sacramento Republic FC (USLC) (California)	0–0 (a.e.t.) (5–4 p)	Sporting Kansas City	Sacramento, California
9:30 PM CDT	Luis Felipe (yellow card) 58'; Ross (yellow card) 90+4'	Report	Sweat (yellow card) 37'; Hernández (yellow card) 127'	Stadium: Heart Health Park; Attendance: 11,569; Referee: Allen Chapman
	Penalties
	Viader (penalty scored); Fernandes (penalty scored); Archimède (penalty scored); Foster (penalty scored); López (penalty scored)		(penalty scored) Russell; (penalty scored) Sallói; (penalty scored) Agada; (penalty scored) Hernández; (penalty missed) Zusi
