= Andreu Fontàs =

Spanish footballer (born 1989)

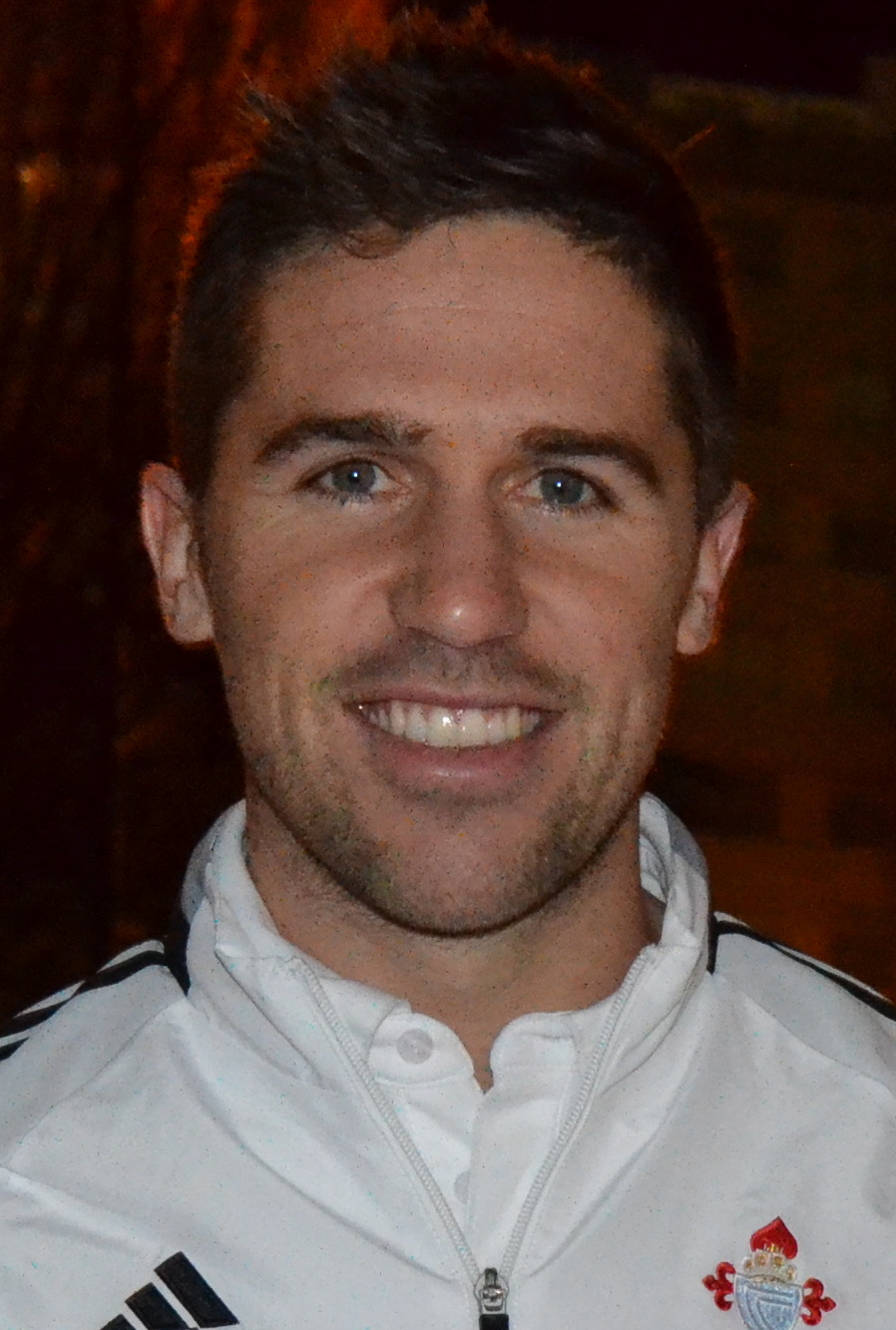
- Fontàs with Celta in 2015

Personal information
- Full name: Andreu Fontàs Prat
- Date of birth: 14 November 1989 (age 36)
- Place of birth: Banyoles, Spain
- Height: 1.88 m (6 ft 2 in)
- Position: Centre-back

Team information
- Current team: Omiya Ardija (assistant)

Youth career
- 1995–2006: Banyoles
- 2006–2007: Girona
- 2007–2008: Barcelona

Senior career*
Years	Team	Apps	(Gls)
2007	Girona	1	(0)
2008–2011	Barcelona B	72	(2)
2009–2013	Barcelona	8	(0)
2012–2013	→ Mallorca (loan)	9	(0)
2013–2018	Celta	105	(2)
2018–2024	Sporting Kansas City	124	(3)
Total		319	(7)

International career
2008	Spain U19	2	(0)
2009	Spain U20	9	(0)
2010–2011	Spain U21	3	(0)
2010–2016	Catalonia	4	(0)
- * Club domestic league appearances and goals

Andreu Fontàs Prat (Catalan pronunciation: [ənˈdɾew funˈtas]; born 14 November 1989) is a Spanish former professional footballer who played as a centre-back. He is currently assistant manager of J2 League club Omiya Ardija.

== Club career ==
=== Early years ===
Born in Banyoles, Girona, Catalonia, Fontàs was a product of FC Barcelona's youth system, having previously played for amateurs CD Banyoles for 11 years.

Originally a defensive midfielder, he was reconverted into central defender by the B team's coach Luis Enrique, a former Barcelona player.

=== Barcelona ===
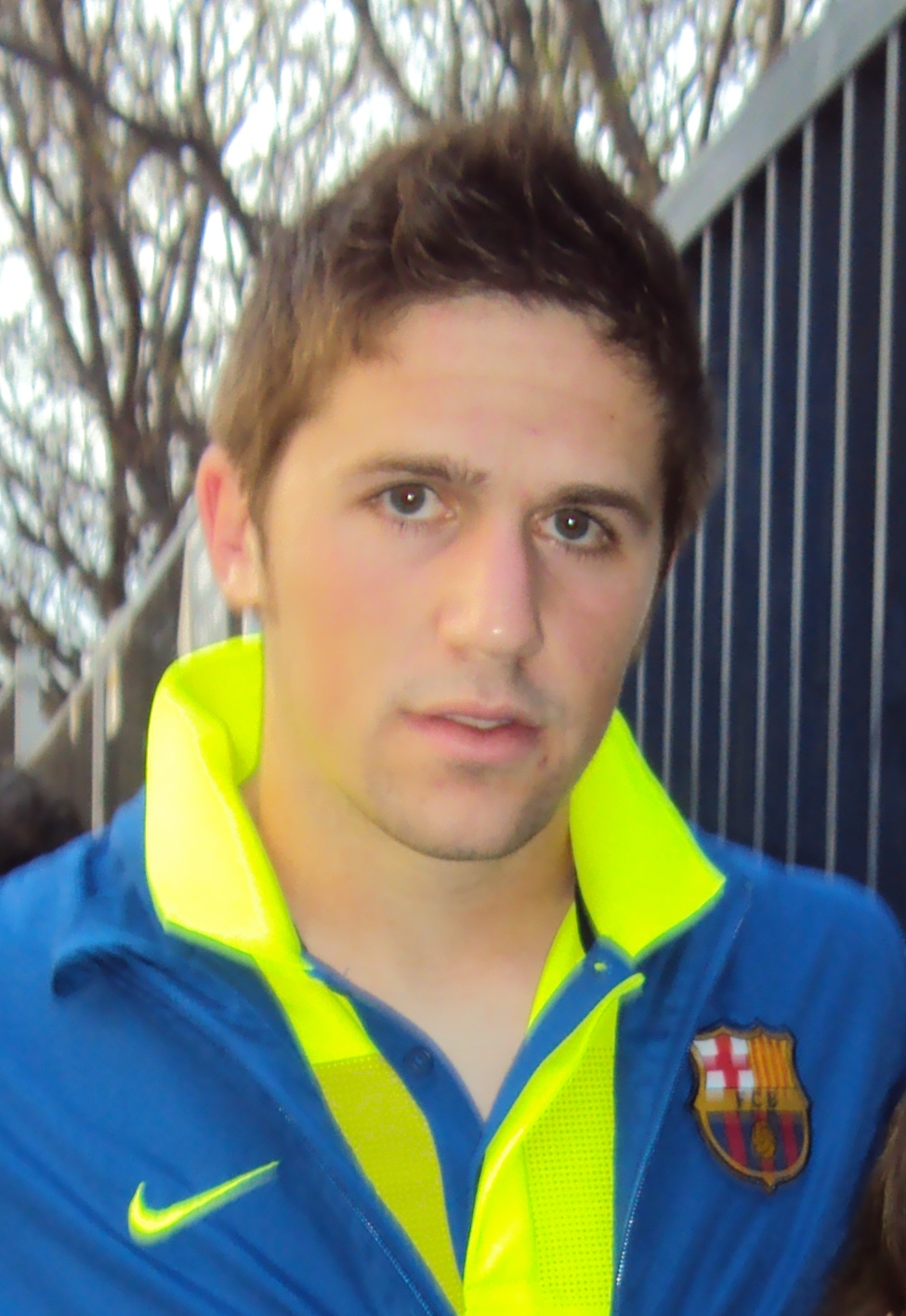
Fontàs as a Barcelona player in 2010

Fontàs made his first team debut on 31 August 2009, replacing another La Masia graduate, Gerard Piqué, in the final six minutes of a 3–0 La Liga home win against Sporting de Gijón. Earlier into the 2009–10 campaign he was called by manager Pep Guardiola to the Supercopa de España and UEFA Super Cup games, respectively against Athletic Bilbao and FC Shakhtar Donetsk, but finally did not make the bench on either occasion. He spent the vast majority of his first senior seasons registered with the reserves.

On 20 November 2010, Fontàs started for the first time in the league with the first team, assisting Pedro with a 50-meter pass for the fourth goal, as Barcelona trounced UD Almería 8–0 away. He made his UEFA Champions League debut on 7 December, against FC Rubin Kazan: as the Blaugrana had already progressed to the knockout stage as group winners, he scored in the 2–0 home victory, converting a pass from fellow youth graduate Thiago Alcântara.

On 16 March 2011, Fontàs was promoted to the senior team on a permanent basis after Eric Abidal was diagnosed with a tumour in his liver, thus becoming unavailable for the rest of the season. He appeared in three consecutive matches in April/May for the eventual champions, always as a left-back. On the 15th, as a starter, he returned to his natural position, in a 0–0 home draw against Deportivo de La Coruña.

Fontàs remained a backup in 2011–12. On 12 January 2012, in a game at CA Osasuna in the round of 16 of the Copa del Rey, he suffered an anterior cruciate ligament injury in the tenth minute of the game, being sidelined for several months.

On 15 October 2012, Fontàs was loaned to RCD Mallorca until the following 30 June, as backup to João Victor who suffered a severe knee injury. He was almost exclusively used as a defensive midfielder during his spell in the Balearic Islands, with the campaign ending in relegation.

=== Celta ===
On 20 June 2013, Fontàs was signed by RC Celta de Vigo, who paid €1 million for the player and signed him to a three-year deal, with Barcelona reserving a buy-back option in addition to rights on any future transfer. He rejoined former Barcelona B boss Luis Enrique in the process, and finished his first year at the Balaídos Stadium with 35 appearances (more than 3,000 minutes of action) to help to a ninth-place finish.

Fontàs terminated his contract with the Galician club on 7 August 2018.

=== Sporting Kansas City ===
On 8 August 2018, Fontàs joined Sporting Kansas City. He made his Major League Soccer debut on 8 September, starting in the 1–0 victory against Orlando City SC.

Fontàs scored his first goal on 24 October 2020, the second in a 4–0 defeat of Colorado Rapids.

== Career statistics ==
Appearances and goals by club, season and competition
Club	Season	League			National cup (Note: Includes Copa del Rey, U.S. Open Cup)		Continental		Other		Total	
Club	Season	Division	Apps	Goals	Apps	Goals	Apps	Goals	Apps	Goals	Apps	Goals
Barcelona B	2008–09	Segunda División B	20	0	—		—		—		20	0
Barcelona B	2009–10	Segunda División B	27	1	—		—		—		27	1
Barcelona B	2010–11	Segunda División B	25	1	—		—		—		25	1
Barcelona B	Total		72	2	—		—		—		72	2
Barcelona	2009–10	La Liga	1	0	1	0	0	0	0	0	2	0
Barcelona	2010–11	La Liga	6	0	1	0	1 (Note: Appearance in UEFA Champions League)	1	0	0	8	1
Barcelona	2011–12	La Liga	1	0	3	0	1	0	1 (Note: Appearance in FIFA Club World Cup)	0	6	0
Barcelona	Total		8	0	5	0	2	1	1	0	16	1
Mallorca (loan)	2012–13	La Liga	9	0	4	0	—		—		13	0
Celta	2013–14	La Liga	35	0	0	0	—		—		35	0
Celta	2014–15	La Liga	34	0	2	0	—		—		36	0
Celta	2015–16	La Liga	7	1	0	0	—		—		7	1
Celta	2016–17	La Liga	17	1	2	0	8 (Note: Appearances in UEFA Europa League)	1	—		27	2
Celta	2017–18	La Liga	12	0	4	0	0	0	—		16	0
Celta	Total		105	2	8	0	8	1	0	0	121	3
Sporting Kansas City	2018	Major League Soccer	2	0	—		—		0	0	35	0
Sporting Kansas City	2019	Major League Soccer	13	0	1	0	4 (Note: Appearances in CONCACAF Champions Cup)	0	—		36	0
Sporting Kansas City	2020	Major League Soccer	3	1	—		—		—		7	1
Sporting Kansas City	2021	Major League Soccer	33	0	—		—		2 (Note: Appearances in MLS Cup playoffs)	0	27	2
Sporting Kansas City	2022	Major League Soccer	28	2	4	0	—		—		16	0
Sporting Kansas City	2023	Major League Soccer	28	0	1	0	—		7 (Note: Four appearances in MLS Cup playoffs, three appearances in Leagues Cup)	0	16	0
Sporting Kansas City	2024	Major League Soccer	17	0	3	0	—		1 (Note: Appearance in Leagues Cup)	0	16	0
Sporting Kansas City	Total		124	3	9	0	4	0	10	0	147	3
Career total			318	7	26	0	14	2	11	0	369	9

== Honours ==
Barcelona

- La Liga: 2009–10, 2010–11
- Copa del Rey: 2011–12
- Supercopa de España: 2009, 2011
- UEFA Champions League: 2010–11
- UEFA Super Cup: 2011
- FIFA Club World Cup: 2011

Spain U20

- Mediterranean Games: 2009
