= Marinos Tzionis =

Cypriot footballer

Personal information
- Full name: Marinos Tzionis
- Date of birth: 16 July 2001 (age 25)
- Place of birth: Nicosia, Cyprus
- Height: 1.69 m (5 ft 7 in)
- Positions: Winger; attacking midfielder

Team information
- Current team: UTA Arad
- Number: 10

Youth career
- –2010: Anagennisi Lythrodonta
- 2010–2012: Football STAR Academy Cyprus
- 2012–2017: Omonia

Senior career*
Years	Team	Apps	(Gls)
2017–2022	Omonia	65	(12)
2022–2024	Sporting Kansas City	57	(2)
2024–2025	Čukarički	15	(0)
2025	→ UTA Arad (loan)	12	(2)
2025–	UTA Arad	44	(3)

International career^{‡}
2017	Cyprus U17	3	(0)
2019	Cyprus U19	7	(0)
2020–	Cyprus	46	(5)
- * Club domestic league appearances and goals as of 22 November 2026 ‡ National team caps and goals as of 15 November 2026

Marinos Tzionis (Greek: Μαρίνος Τζιωνής; born 16 July 2001) is a Cypriot professional footballer who plays as a winger or as an attacking midfielder for Liga I club UTA Arad and the Cyprus national team.

== Career ==
=== Omonia ===
On 26 September 2017, Tzionis signed his first contract as a professional footballer, joining Omonia.

Tzionis finished the 2017–18 season with just two appearances. However, in Summer 2018, the club underwent a change of ownership, and put a large emphasis on youth development. This resulted in Tzionis being given more opportunities the following season, which he took advantage of, scoring his first three goals for the club.

The 2020–21 season proved successful for player and team alike, as Tzionis helped Omonia win the Cypriot First Division for the first time in over a decade. He scored seven goals in the competition, many of which played a vital role in winning the league. In addition, he played his first continental games, including all six of Omonia's games in the 2020–21 Europa League group stage.

Tzionis scored his first goal in a European competition on 5 August 2021, in a 1–0 win over Flora Tallinn, in a Europa League qualifier.

=== Sporting Kansas City ===
On 24 January 2022, MLS club Sporting Kansas City announced they had signed Tzionis on a three-year contract, for a reported fee of around €1.6 million.

=== FK Čukarički ===
On 26 July 2024, Tzionis joined Serbian SuperLiga side FK Čukarički.

== Career statistics ==
=== Club ===
As of 22 November 2026

Appearances and goals by club, season and competition
Club	Season	League			National cup (Note: Includes Cypriot Cup, U.S. Open Cup, Serbian Cup, Cupa României)		Europe		Other		Total	
Club	Season	Division	Apps	Goals	Apps	Goals	Apps	Goals	Apps	Goals	Apps	Goals
Omonia	2017–18	Cypriot First Division	2	0	—		—		—		2	0
Omonia	2018–19	Cypriot First Division	11	3	0	0	—		—		11	3
Omonia	2019–20	Cypriot First Division	5	0	3	2	—		—		8	2
Omonia	2020–21	Cypriot First Division	32	7	2	0	9 (Note: Three appearances in UEFA Champions League, six appearances in UEFA Europa League)	0	—		43	7
Omonia	2021–22	Cypriot First Division	15	2	0	0	9 (Note: Two appearances in UEFA Champions League, four appearances and one goal in UEFA Europa League, three appearances in UEFA Europa Conference League)	1	0	0	24	3
Omonia	Total		65	12	5	2	18	1	0	0	88	15
Sporting Kansas City	2022	Major League Soccer	27	1	2	1	—		—		29	2
Sporting Kansas City	2023	Major League Soccer	21	0	2	1	—		1 (Note: Appearance in Leagues Cup)	0	24	1
Sporting Kansas City	2024	Major League Soccer	9	1	2	2	—		—		11	3
Sporting Kansas City	Total		57	2	6	4	—		1	0	64	6
Čukarički	2024–25	Serbian SuperLiga	15	0	1	0	—		—		16	0
UTA Arad (loan)	2024–25	Liga I	12	2	—		—		—		12	2
UTA Arad	2025–26	Liga I	28	1	3	0	—		—		31	1
UTA Arad	2026–27	Liga I	16	2	2	1	—		—		18	3
UTA Arad	Total		56	5	5	1	—		—		61	6
Career total			193	19	17	7	18	1	1	0	229	27

=== International ===
As of match played 15 November 2026

Appearances and goals by national team and year
National team	Year	Apps	Goals
Cyprus
Cyprus	2020	7	0
Cyprus	2021	6	0
Cyprus	2022	7	2
Cyprus	2023	5	0
Cyprus	2024	6	1
Cyprus	2025	9	0
Cyprus	2026	6	2
Total		46	5

Scores and results list Cyprus' goal tally first, score column indicates score after each Tzionis goal.

List of international goals scored by Marinos Tzionis
No.	Date	Venue	Opponent	Score	Result	Competition
1	29 March 2022	AEK Arena – Georgios Karapatakis, Larnaca, Cyprus	Estonia	1–0	2–0	2020–21 UEFA Nations League
2	24 September 2022	AEK Arena – Georgios Karapatakis, Larnaca, Cyprus	Greece	1–0	1–0	2022–23 UEFA Nations League
3	15 November 2024	AEK Arena – Georgios Karapatakis, Larnaca, Cyprus	Lithuania	2–1	2–1	2024–25 UEFA Nations League
4	4 June 2026	Stožice Stadium, Ljubljana, Slovenia	Slovenia	1–0	1–1	Friendly
5	7 June 2026	Rheinpark Stadion, Vaduz, Liechtenstein	Liechtenstein	1–0	2–0	Friendly

== Honours ==
Omonia

- Cypriot First Division: 2020–21
- Cypriot Super Cup: 2021

Individual

- Cypriot First Division Young Player of the Year: 2021–22
