= Alenis Vargas =

Honduran footballer (born 2003)

Personal information
- Full name: Waldir Alenis Vargas Valentin
- Date of birth: 4 December 2003 (age 22)
- Place of birth: San Pedro Sula, Honduras
- Height: 1.85 m (6 ft 1 in)
- Positions: Forward; winger

Team information
- Current team: Manisa (on loan from SJK)
- Number: 7

Youth career
- 2019–2020: Academia Leones
- 2020–2022: Olimpia

Senior career*
Years	Team	Apps	(Gls)
2022–2023	Fútbol Consultants		
2023	→ Sporting Kansas City II (loan)	22	(7)
2024	Sporting Kansas City	20	(2)
2025–	SJK	26	(4)
2026–	→ Manisa (loan)	17	(1)

International career^{‡}
2025–	Honduras	1	(0)
- * Club domestic league appearances and goals as of 6 May 2026 ‡ National team caps and goals as of 12:45, 6 September 2025 (UTC)

Waldir Alenis Vargas Valentin (born 4 December 2003) is a Honduran professional footballer who plays as a forward or winger for TFF 1. Lig club Manisa, on loan from Veikkausliiga club SJK Seinäjoki, and the Honduras national team.

== Early life ==
Vargas was born and raised in San Pedro Sula, Honduras. He did not begin playing football competitively until he was 16-years-old. In 2019, Vargas joined Academia Internacional de Fútbol Leones (Lions International Football Academy), a footballing academy based in San Pedro Sula. A year later, he joined the youth setup of Olimpia, the most successful club in Honduras. He spent a majority of the time there training with the senior squad, but never made an official appearance.

== Club career ==
In 2022, Vargas signed with Costa Rican club Fútbol Consultants in the second-tier. During the latter half of the year, he had tryouts at Costa Rican clubs Saprissa and Cartaginés.

On 18 April 2023, he signed for Sporting Kansas City II, the reserve side of Major League Soccer club Sporting Kansas City, on a year-long loan. He made his MLS Next Pro debut the following 23 April in a 3–2 away defeat against FC Cincinnati 2, assisting Pau Vidal for the first goal. Vargas would score his first goal for Kansas City II on 2 July, the 5th goal in the 7–1 home routing of Whitecaps FC 2. The following 13 August, he would score a hat-trick in 6–1 home win against Portland Timbers 2.

On 15 December 2023, Sporting Kansas City officially acquired Vargas permanently from Fútbol Consultants, promoting him to the senior squad. On 2 February 2024, he made his MLS debut in a 1–1 draw with the Houston Dynamo, coming off the bench in the 86th minute. On 8 June, Vargas scored the game-winning goal in the 85th minute in a 2–1 victory over Seattle Sounders. After finishing the season with two goals in 20 appearances, Vargas was waived by the club on 21 February 2025.

On 21 March 2025, Finnish club SJK Seinäjoki announced the signing of Vargas on a two-year deal with an option to extend for a further year. He made his debut the following 5 April in the first matchday of the season against KTP, coming off the bench to assist Momodou Bojang for the only goal of the match. The following 28 April, he scored his first goal in Veikkausliiga in a 2–2 draw with Haka at home.

On 12 January 2026, Vargas signed with Turkish second division side Manisa on a 6-month loan deal until June 2026, with an option for Manisa to make the transfer permanent. On 15 July, his loan was extended until the end of the 2026–27 season.

== International career ==
Vargas was first called up to the Honduras national football team for 2024 Copa América qualifying play-offs.

== Style of play ==
Vargas mainly operates as a striker. He is known for his strength.

== Career statistics ==
As of 19 July 2026

Appearances and goals by club, season and competition
Club	Season	League			National cup (Note: Includes U.S. Open Cup and Suomen Cup)		League cup (Note: Includes Finnish League Cup)		Continental		Other		Total	
Club	Season	Division	Apps	Goals	Apps	Goals	Apps	Goals	Apps	Goals	Apps	Goals	Apps	Goals
Sporting Kansas City II (loan)	2023	MLS Next Pro	21	6	–		–		–		–		21	6
Sporting Kansas City II (loan)	2024	MLS Next Pro	1	1	–		–		–		–		1	1
Sporting Kansas City II (loan)	Total		22	7	0	0	0	0	0	0	0	0	22	7
Sporting Kansas City	2024	MLS	20	2	0	0	–		0	0	2 (Note: Appearances in Leagues Cup)	0	22	2
SJK Seinäjoki	2025	Veikkausliiga	26	4	2	1	0	0	2 (Note: Appearances in UEFA Conference League)	0	–		30	5
Manisa (loan)	2025–26	TFF 1. Lig	17	1	–		–		–		–		17	1
Career total			85	14	2	1	0	0	2	0	2	0	91	15
