= John Pulskamp =

American soccer player (born 2001)

Personal information
- Full name: John Gregory Pulskamp
- Date of birth: April 19, 2001 (age 25)
- Place of birth: Bakersfield, California, U.S.
- Height: 6 ft 2 in (1.87 m)
- Position: Goalkeeper

Team information
- Current team: Sporting Kansas City
- Number: 1

Youth career
- 2015–2016: Central California Aztecs
- 2016–2017: Real So Cal
- 2017–2019: LA Galaxy

Senior career*
Years	Team	Apps	(Gls)
2019–	Sporting Kansas City II	44	(0)
2020–	Sporting Kansas City	63	(0)

International career^{‡}
2020	United States U20	1	(0)
2023–2024	United States U23	3	(0)
- * Club domestic league appearances and goals as of October 23, 2025 ‡ National team caps and goals as of November 20, 2023

John Gregory Pulskamp (born April 19, 2001) is an American professional soccer player who plays as a goalkeeper for Major League Soccer club Sporting Kansas City.

== Club career ==
Born in Bakersfield, California, Pulskamp began his career with U.S. Soccer Development Academy sides Central California Aztecs and Real So Cal, before joining the youth academy at LA Galaxy. On June 23, 2018, Pulskamp made an appearance on the bench for LA Galaxy II, the club's reserve side in the USL Championship, but did not come on as a substitute.

On April 5, 2019, Pulskamp signed with Sporting Kansas City II, the reserve side of Major League Soccer club Sporting Kansas City. He made his debut for the side on May 6 against Louisville City, starting in a 3–2 victory. Pulskamp ended his first professional season helping his side keep three clean sheets from 14 matches.

=== Sporting Kansas City ===
On February 24, 2020, Pulskamp signed a professional homegrown player deal with Major League Soccer club Sporting Kansas City. He spent the majority of the 2020 season as a backup goalkeeper, appearing on the bench 13 times but without making a single appearance. He also made two appearances for Sporting Kansas City II in the USL Championship, with loans being limited due to the COVID-19 pandemic.

Pulskamp made his debut for Sporting on April 17, 2021, during the club's first match of the season against the New York Red Bulls. Due to injuries to Sporting Kansas City's starting goalkeeper, Tim Melia and two backups, Pulskamp was given the start. The match ended in a 2–1 victory.

== International career ==
Pulskamp was born in the United States to an American father and Palestinian mother and is eligible for both national teams. On January 18, 2020, he made his international debut for the United States under-20 side against Mexico U20. In December 2021, he was called up to the senior team for their friendly against Bosnia and Herzegovina, but did not make an appearance in the match. He was selected as a 2024 Olympic squad alternative.

== Career statistics ==
=== Club ===
As of match played October 18, 2025

Appearances and goals by club, season and competition
Club	Season	League			National cup		Playoffs		Continental		Other		Total	
Club	Season	Division	Apps	Goals	Apps	Goals	Apps	Goals	Apps	Goals	Apps	Goals	Apps	Goals
Sporting Kansas City II	2019	USL	14	0	—		—		—		—		14	0
Sporting Kansas City II	2020	USL	2	0	—		—		—		—		2	0
Sporting Kansas City II	2021	USL	12	0	—		—		—		—		12	0
Sporting Kansas City II	2022	MLS Next Pro	6	0	—		—		—		—		6	0
Sporting Kansas City II	2023	MLS Next Pro	9	0	—		—		—		—		9	0
Sporting Kansas City II	2024	MLS Next Pro	1	0	—		—		—		—		1	0
Sporting Kansas City II	Total		44	0	—		—		—		—		44	0
Sporting Kansas City	2020	MLS	0	0	—		0	0	—		—		0	0
Sporting Kansas City	2021	MLS	6	0	—		0	0	—		1 (Note: Appearances in Leagues Cup)	0	7	0
Sporting Kansas City	2022	MLS	12	0	4	0	—		—		—		16	0
Sporting Kansas City	2023	MLS	5	0	2	0	0	0	—		3	0	10	0
Sporting Kansas City	2024	MLS	6	0	2	0	—		—		1	0	9	0
Sporting Kansas City	2025	MLS	34	0	—		—		2	0	—		36	0
Sporting Kansas City	Total		63	0	8	0	0	0	2	0	5	0	42	0
Career total			107	0	8	0	0	0	0	0	5	0	120	0

== Personal life ==
Pulskamp is a practicing Muslim and has supported the MLS rule change allowing additional stoppage time for Muslim players to drink water at sundown during the holy month of Ramadan.
