= Robert Voloder =

German footballer (born 2001)

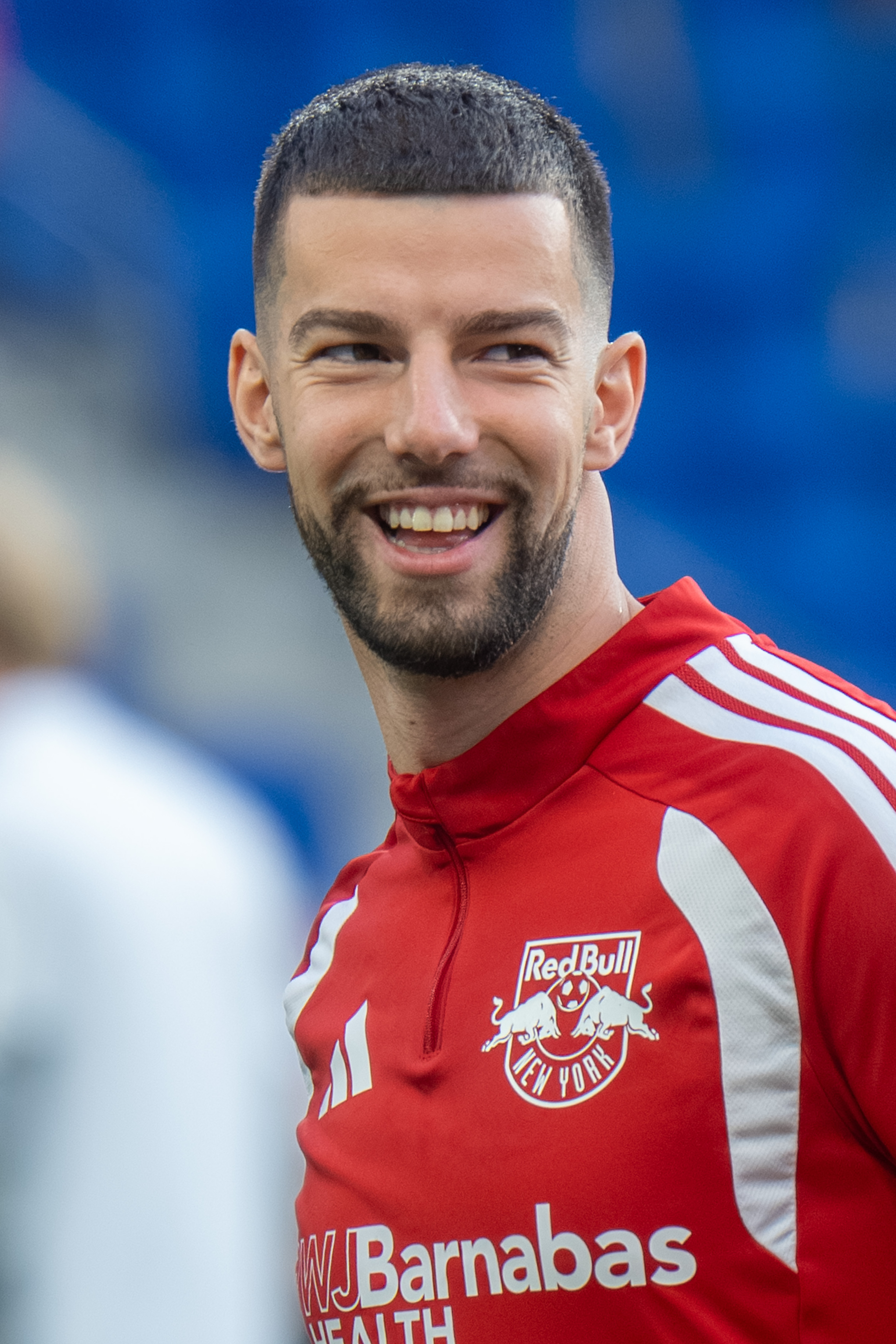
- Voloder with the New York Red Bulls in 2026

Personal information
- Date of birth: 9 May 2001 (age 25)
- Place of birth: Frankfurt, Germany
- Height: 1.85 m (6 ft 1 in)
- Position: Defender

Team information
- Current team: New York Red Bulls
- Number: 6

Youth career
- 2008–2010: Eintracht Frankfurt
- 2010–2014: FSV Frankfurt
- 2014–2015: SG Rosenhöhe Offenbach
- 2015–2016: FSV Frankfurt
- 2016–2020: 1. FC Köln

Senior career*
Years	Team	Apps	(Gls)
2019–2021	1. FC Köln II	27	(1)
2020–2021	1. FC Köln	0	(0)
2021	→ Maribor (loan)	20	(2)
2022	Maribor	0	(0)
2022–2025	Sporting Kansas City	65	(1)
2023	Sporting Kansas City II	7	(1)
2026–	New York Red Bulls	9	(0)

International career
2017–2018	Bosnia and Herzegovina U17 (Note: Official UEFA competitive matches only.)	9	(0)
2019	Bosnia and Herzegovina U18	1	(0)
2018–2019	Bosnia and Herzegovina U19	3	(0)
2019	Germany U19	3	(0)
2020–2021	Germany U20	5	(0)
- * Club domestic league appearances and goals as of 19:35, 15 November 2026 (UTC)

Robert Voloder (born 9 May 2001) is a German professional footballer who plays as a defender for Major League Soccer club New York Red Bulls.

== Club career ==
Born in Frankfurt, Volder began his career in the academy of local club Eintracht Frankfurt. He also played in the youth ranks of FSV Frankfurt and SG Rosenhöhe Offenbach, before joining 1. FC Köln in 2016.

=== 1. FC Köln ===
In May 2020, Voloder signed his first professional contract with 1. FC Köln that would keep him at the club until 2023. During the 2020–21 season, Voloder made 26 Regionalliga appearances (all as a starter) for 1. FC Köln II, scoring one goal.

=== Maribor ===
In June 2021, he was sent on loan to Slovenian PrvaLiga side Maribor. On 18 July 2021, Voloder made his professional debut in a PrvaLiga match against Celje. He featured in all 20 league matches in the first half of the season scoring two goals, before Maribor activated the possibility of making the transfer permanent in December 2021. The club would end the season as league champion.

=== Sporting Kansas City ===
On 19 January 2022, Voloder signed a three-year contract with Major League Soccer side Sporting Kansas City, with an option for another year. Voloder scored his first goal with Sporting on 13 September 2022, in a 3–0 victory over D.C. United.

Following the 2025 season, Kansas City opted to release Voloder from the club. He appeared in 78 matches and scored 1 goal in four seasons at the club.

=== New York Red Bulls ===
On 12 January 2026, fellow MLS side New York Red Bulls signed Voloder to a three-year contract, with an option through June 2029.

== Career statistics ==
As of match played 30 September 2026

Appearances and goals by club, season and competition
Club	Season	League			National cup (Note: Includes U.S. Open Cup)		Continental		Other		Total	
Club	Season	Division	Apps	Goals	Apps	Goals	Apps	Goals	Apps	Goals	Apps	Goals
1. FC Köln II	2019–20	Regionalliga West	1	0	0	0	—		0	0	1	0
1. FC Köln II	2020–21	Regionalliga West	26	1	0	0	—		0	0	26	1
1. FC Köln II	Total		27	1	0	0	0	0	0	0	27	1
Maribor (loan)	2021–22	Slovenian PrvaLiga	20	2	0	0	4 (Note: Appearances in UEFA Europa Conference League)	0	0	0	24	2
Sporting Kansas City	2022	Major League Soccer	12	1	2	0	—		—		14	1
Sporting Kansas City	2023	Major League Soccer	14	0	2	0	—		0	0	16	0
Sporting Kansas City	2024	Major League Soccer	21	0	4	0	—		3 (Note: Appearances in Leagues Cup)	0	28	0
Sporting Kansas City	2025	Major League Soccer	18	0	—		2 (Note: Appearances in CONCACAF Champions Cup)	0	—		20	0
Sporting Kansas City	Total		65	1	8	0	2	0	3	0	78	1
Sporting Kansas City II	2023	MLS Next Pro	7	1	—		—		0	0	7	1
New York Red Bulls	2026	Major League Soccer	9	0	2	0	—		—		11	0
Career total			128	5	10	0	6	0	3	0	147	5
