= Armando Villarreal =

American soccer referee

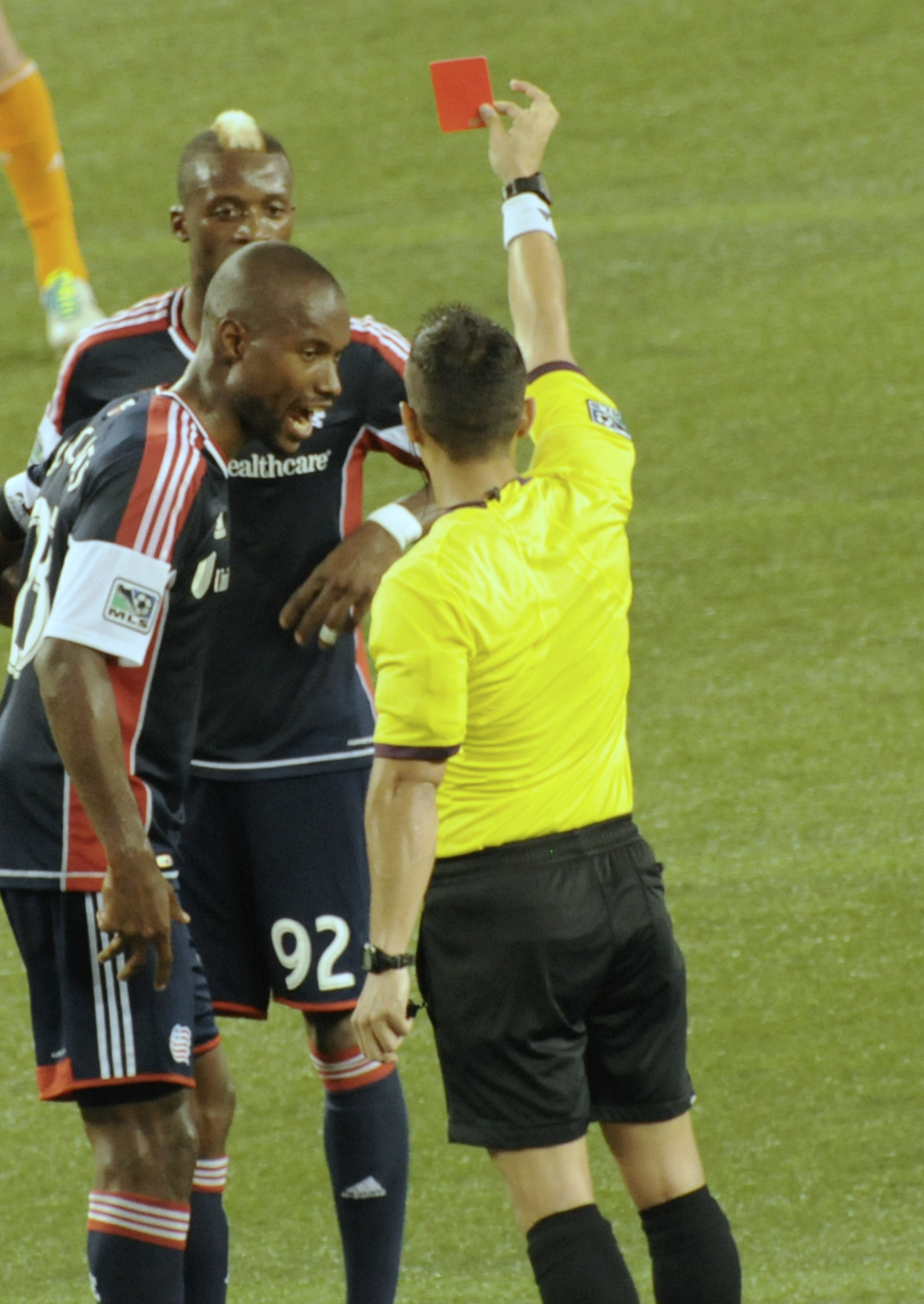
- Villarreal giving a red card in 2013
- Born: 1986 (age 39–40)

Domestic
Years	League	Role
2012–	Major League Soccer	Referee

International
Years	League	Role
2015–	FIFA	Referee
2022–	FIFA	Video Match Official

Armando Villarreal (born 1986) is an American soccer referee. He has officiated in Major League Soccer since 2012 and was added to the FIFA International Referees List in 2015. He has been selected to several FIFA World Cups as a video assistant referee.

== Biography ==
Villarreal began refereeing at the age of 18, when a league in which he played in Brownsville, Texas, needed volunteers for under-5 matches. He then took a United States Soccer Federation (USSF) course to qualify for grade 8 as a referee and began officiating around Texas.

=== Domestic ===
After working as a fourth official in Major League Soccer (MLS), Villarreal was referee for his first game in the competition on May 24, 2012, between the New York Red Bulls and Chivas USA. He officiated in the US Open Cup final in 2014 and 2024. He officiated in the final of the 2016 USL Playoffs. He was appointed the referee for MLS Cup 2021 between the Portland Timbers and New York City FC and MLS Cup 2023 between the Columbus Crew and Los Angeles FC.

=== International ===
Villarreal's first international match was on May 29, 2011, in a 2–2 friendly tie between El Salvador and Honduras in Houston. He was added to the FIFA International Referees List in 2015. He was chosen for the CONCACAF Gold Cup in 2017, 2019, 2021, and 2023, as well as the Copa América Centenario also in the United States. He was also selected as a VAR for the Club World Cup in 2025.

==== 2022 FIFA World Cup ====
He was one of 24 Video Assistant Referees (VAR) chosen for the 2022 FIFA World Cup. Villarreal was the VAR for the group stage match between Portugal and Ghana. In the 62nd minute, referee Ismail Elfath awarded a penalty to Portugal. Villarreal elected not to recommend a review and Portugal went on to win the match 3-2. Villarreal was assigned 12 other VAR roles across the World Cup.

==== 2023 FIFA Women's World Cup ====
Villarreal was selected as a VAR for the 2023 Women's World Cup. Villarreal was assigned as an AVAR for the quarterfinal between England and Colombia, and the semifinal between Spain and Sweden. Villarreal was then selected as a support VAR for the final led by referee Tori Penso.

==== 2026 FIFA World Cup ====
Villarreal was announced as one of the VARs selected for the 2026 FIFA World Cup in North America. He was one of 8 American officials selected for the tournament. He received thirteen assignments during the tournament including the standby VAR for the semifinal, and the AVAR for the third place match.

Villarreal was the VAR for the group stage match between Ghana and England. Villarreal received criticism for not recommending a review for a penalty when England's Ezri Konsa challenged Ghana's Prince Adu.
