= Dániel Sallói =

Hungarian footballer (born 1996)

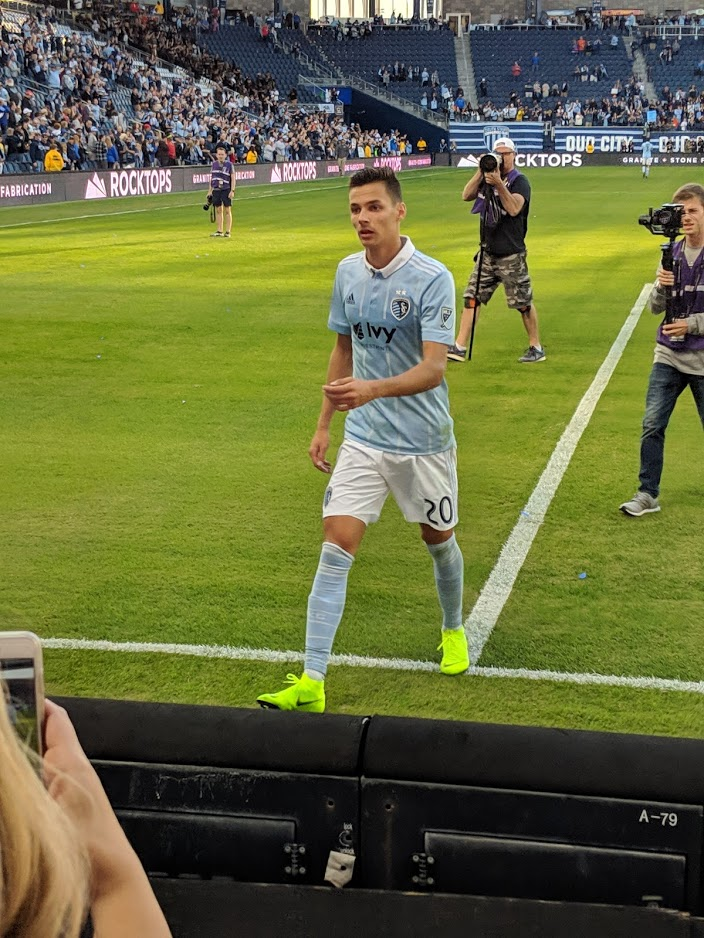
- Sallói with Sporting Kansas City in 2018

Personal information
- Full name: Dániel Sallói
- Date of birth: 19 July 1996 (age 30)
- Place of birth: Siófok, Hungary
- Height: 1.85 m (6 ft 1 in)
- Positions: Striker; winger

Team information
- Current team: Toronto FC
- Number: 20

Youth career
- 2005–2014: Újpest FC
- 2014–2015: Sporting Kansas City

Senior career*
Years	Team	Apps	(Gls)
2015	Újpest FC	12	(1)
2016–2025	Sporting Kansas City	243	(54)
2016	→ Swope Park Rangers (loan)	10	(4)
2016	→ Gyirmót (loan)	13	(2)
2017	→ Swope Park Rangers (loan)	3	(1)
2026–	Toronto FC	34	(9)

International career^{‡}
2013–2014	Hungary U18	1	(0)
2017	Hungary U21	4	(1)
2021–	Hungary	4	(0)
- * Club domestic league appearances and goals as of 7 November 2026 ‡ National team caps and goals as of 2 September 2021

Dániel Sallói (Hungarian: [ˈdaːniɛl ˈʃɒlloːi]; born 19 July 1996) is a Hungarian professional footballer who plays as a striker or winger for Major League Soccer club Toronto FC and the Hungary national team.

== Club career ==
=== Youth ===
Sallói worked his way through the youth ranks of Nemzeti Bajnokság I club Újpest FC in his home town of Budapest, Hungary beginning in 2005. He was a member of the U16, U17, and U21 sides between 2011 and 2014. He was named the U16 and U17 academy Player of the Year during his one season with each team. For the 2013/14 season, the U21 team claimed second place in Hungary's U21 championship with Sallói as a member. In 2014, he traveled to the United States as a foreign exchange student and attended Blue Valley Northwest High School in Overland Park, Kansas. At that time he joined the U18 academy of Sporting Kansas City of Major League Soccer coached by fellow Hungarian and friend of his father István Urbányi. During the 2014/15 academy season, he scored a team-high 21 goals in 28 appearances, including three hat-tricks.

=== Professional ===
In July 2015, Sallói returned to his former club by signing for the first team of Újpest FC, although on an amateur contract. He made his professional debut on 18 July 2015, a day before his 19th birthday. He scored his first professional league goal exactly one week later in a 3–1 victory over Vasas SC. He also made four appearances for the club in the Magyar Kupa, scoring six goals in the competition. In total, he scored seven goals and four assists in sixteen matches in all competitions. In league play, he scored one goal in twelve appearances.

On 13 January 2016, it was announced that Sallói had returned to Sporting Kansas City, signing a professional, first-team contract and becoming the club's fourth all-time homegrown player. He was eligible to be a HGP because of his residence in the area and because he had played for the club's academy team.

Prior to the 2016 Major League Soccer season, Sallói was loaned to Sporting's reserve side, Swope Park Rangers. In total, he scored four goals in ten league appearances during the loan. In June 2016, it was announced that he would return to Hungary for a year-long loan at Vasas. However, after only the first match of the season, the loan was switched to newly promoted Gyirmót who was coached by István Urbányi, Sallói's former coach at the Sporting Kansas City Academy.

After appearing with the reserve team in 2016, Sallói was a rotational piece in Sporting's front line in 2017, starting 12 and appearing in 22 regular season MLS matches, mostly as a winger. Sallói scored three goals and assisted two in league play. Sallói was also a heavy contributor in Sporting's 2017 Open Cup championship run, scoring the winning goal in the 2017 Open Cup final against the New York Red Bulls off a through ball from midfielder Benny Feilhaber.

Sallói became the starting left winger for Sporting through the 2018 season, helping KC finish atop the Western Conference. Sallói scored 11 goals and assisted 7 times in regular season play, with an additional three goals in the 2018 MLS Playoffs. Through 2019 and 2020, Sallói entered a scoring slump, scoring one goal in 35 league appearances through both seasons.

Sallói rebounded in 2021, helping Sporting reach 3rd place in the West. Sallói finished with 16 goals and 8 assists and was named a finalist for the Landon Donovan MLS MVP Award.

Sallói joined Toronto FC from a trade with Sporting Kansas City, signing with Toronto FC for a two-year deal through the 2027 season with a club option of 2028.

== International career ==
Sallói was a member of Hungary's national U18 side from 2013 to 2014. He was a member of the U18 squad for the Václav Ježek Tournament in 2013 and debuted for the U18 team during the tournament during a 1–0 victory over Ukraine. The team won the bronze medal in the tournament after beating the Czech Republic 5–4 on penalties in the 3rd place match in which Sallói came on as a 46th-minute substitute. On 16 March 2014, he appeared in a friendly draw against Gibraltar as part of the team's preparation for the 2014 UEFA European Under-19 Championship. However, he was not named to the squad for the tournament because of travel restrictions on his visa while he lived in the United States. He has also trained with the national U21 team.

He made his debut for the Hungary national football team on 2 September 2021 in a World Cup qualifier against England, a 0–4 home loss. He substituted Roland Sallai in the 66th minute.

== Personal life ==
Sallói was born in Siófok, Hungary and was raised in Budapest. He is the son of former professional footballer and Hungarian international and current sporting director István Sallói. His father István had been a teammate of Sporting Kansas City manager Peter Vermes at Győri ETO FC.

In April 2019, Sallói earned a U.S. green card which qualifies him as a domestic player for MLS roster purposes.

In 2024, Sallói became an American citizen.

== Career statistics ==
=== Club ===
As of match played 7 November 2026

Appearances and goals by club, season and competition
Club	Season	League			National cup		Continental		Other		Total	
Club	Season	Division	Apps	Goals	Apps	Goals	Apps	Goals	Apps	Goals	Apps	Goals
Újpest	2015–16	NB I	12	1	5	6	—		—		17	7
Sporting Kansas City	2017	MLS	22	3	4	3	—		1 (Note: Appearance(s) in MLS Cup playoffs)	0	27	6
Sporting Kansas City	2018	MLS	29	11	3	2	—		4	3	36	16
Sporting Kansas City	2019	MLS	28	1	1	0	5 (Note: Appearances in CONCACAF Champions League/Cup)	0	—		34	1
Sporting Kansas City	2020	MLS	8 (Note: Includes three appearances in MLS is Back Tournament group stage)	0	—		—		1 (Note: Appearance in MLS is Back Tournament knockout stage)	0	9	0
Sporting Kansas City	2021	MLS	30	16	—		—		3 (Note: One appearance in Leagues Cup, two appearances in MLS Cup playoffs)	0	33	16
Sporting Kansas City	2022	MLS	29	7	4	2	—		—		33	9
Sporting Kansas City	2023	MLS	34	7	2	1	—		6 (Note: Two appearances in Leagues Cup, four appearances and two goals in MLS Cup playoffs)	2	42	10
Sporting Kansas City	2024	MLS	30	2	5	0	—		3 (Note: Appearances in Leagues Cup)	0	38	2
Sporting Kansas City	2025	MLS	33	7	—		2	0	—		35	7
Sporting Kansas City	Total		243	54	19	8	7	0	18	5	287	67
Swope Park Rangers (loan)	2016	USL	10	4	—		—		—		10	4
Gyirmót (loan)	2016–17	NB I	13	2	—		—		—		13	2
Swope Park Rangers (loan)	2017	USL	3	1	—		—		—		3	1
Toronto FC	2026	MLS	34	9	0	0	—		—		34	9
Career total			315	71	24	14	7	0	18	5	364	90

=== International ===
As of match played 9 October 2021

Appearances and goals by national team and year
National team	Year	Apps	Goals
Hungary	2021	4	0
Total		4	0

== Honours ==
Sporting Kansas City

- U.S. Open Cup: 2017; runner-up: 2024
- Western Conference (regular season): 2018, 2020

Individual

- MLS All-Star: 2021
- Sporting Kansas City Golden Boot: 2018, 2021
