= Kayden Pierre =

American soccer player

Personal information
- Full name: Kayden Leighton Hugh Pierre
- Date of birth: February 16, 2003 (age 23)
- Place of birth: Rochester Hills, Michigan, United States
- Height: 1.74 m (5 ft 9 in)
- Position: Defender

Team information
- Current team: Jong Genk
- Number: 2

Youth career
- 2016–2018: Vardar SC
- 2018–2021: Sporting Kansas City

Senior career*
| Years | Team | Apps | (Gls) |
| 2020–2024 | Sporting Kansas City II | 42 | (1) |
| 2021–2024 | Sporting Kansas City | 27 | (0) |
| 2024– | Jong Genk | 54 | (0) |
| 2024– | Genk | 0 | (0) |

International career^{‡}
| 2021 | United States U20 | 3 | (0) |
| 2026– | Haiti | 2 | (0) |
- * Club domestic league appearances and goals as of August 15, 2026 ‡ National team caps and goals as of November 17, 2026

Kayden Leighton Hugh Pierre (born February 16, 2003) is an professional soccer player who plays as a defender for Challenger Pro League club Jong Genk, the reserve team of Genk. Born in the United States, he represented it internationally as a junior, before switching allegiance to Haiti on a senior level.

== Club career ==
Pierre began playing with Michigan-based USSDA club Vardar SC in 2016, before moving to the academy side of Major League Soccer club Sporting Kansas City in 2018. On August 28, 2020, Pierre signed an academy-contract with Kansas City's USL Championship side Sporting Kansas City II.

On September 22, 2020, Pierre appeared as an 67th-minute substitute during a 4–0 loss to Austin Bold.

On May 4, 2021, Pierre signed to Kansas City's Major League Soccer roster as a homegrown player.

On September 4, 2024, Pierre signed a four-year contract with Genk in Belgian Pro League.

== International career ==
Pierre made his debut for the Haiti national team on November 14, 2026 in a CONCACAF Nations League game against his birth country, the United States. He played a full game as Haiti lost 0–6.

== Personal life ==
Pierre is of Jamaican descent through his maternal grandfather, who played for the Jamaica national team.
