= Ryan Schewe =

American soccer player (born 2002)

Personal information
- Date of birth: March 8, 2002 (age 24)
- Place of birth: Marietta, Georgia, United States
- Height: 6 ft 4 in (1.93 m)
- Position: Goalkeeper

Team information
- Current team: Louisville City on loan from Sporting Kansas City
- Number: 29

Youth career
- Atlanta United FC
- United Futbol Academy

College career
Years	Team	Apps	(Gls)
2020–2023	Georgetown Hoyas	29	(0)

Senior career*
Years	Team	Apps	(Gls)
2022	Apotheos FC		
2023	Westchester Flames		
2024–	Sporting Kansas City	0	(0)
2024–2026	→ Sporting Kansas City II (loan)	16	(0)
2026–	→ Louisville City (loan)	0	(0)
- * Club domestic league appearances and goals as of September 04, 2026

Ryan Schewe (born March 8, 2002) is an American professional soccer player who plays for Louisville City FC in the USL Championship on loan from Major League Soccer club Sporting Kansas City.

== Early life ==
Schewe played youth soccer with the Atlanta United academy, followed by the United Futbol Academy for three seasons.

== College career ==
In 2020, he began attending Georgetown University, where he played for the men's soccer team. He made his collegiate debut on September 20, 2022, against the James Madison Dukes. During the 2022 season, he was named the Big East Conference Goalkeeper of the Week and the National Player of the Week in late October, and was also twice named to the Big East Weekly Honor Roll. At the end of the season, he was named to the All-Big East Second Team.

Ahead of the 2023 season, he was named to the All-Big East Preseason Team and the big East Preseason Goalkeeper of the Year. At the end of the season, he was named to the All-Big East First Team and the Big East Goalkeeper of the Year. He was also named to the All-America Second Team, a Second Team Scholar All-American, and the Academic All-District Team.

== Club career ==
In 2022, Schewe played with Apotheos FC in the National Premier Soccer League and in 2023, with the Westchester Flames in USL League Two.

At the 2024 MLS SuperDraft, he was selected in the first round (22nd overall) by Sporting Kansas City. In February 2024, he signed a professional contract with the club for the 2024 season, with club options for 2025 through 2027.

In September 2026, Louisville City FC acquired Schewe on loan from Sporting Kansas City for the remainder of the 2026 USL Championship season.
