= Daniel Rosero =

Colombian footballer (born 1993)

Dany Rosero
Personal information
- Full name: Dany Alejandro Rosero Valencia
- Date of birth: 6 October 1993 (age 33)
- Place of birth: Bogotá, Colombia
- Height: 1.87 m (6 ft 2 in)
- Position: Centre-back

Team information
- Current team: América de Cali
- Number: 3

Youth career
- –2012: Arsenal de Sarandí

Senior career*
Years	Team	Apps	(Gls)
2012–2015	Arsenal de Sarandí	16	(0)
2016	Patriotas Boyacá	42	(5)
2017–2019	Deportivo Cali	130	(9)
2020–2023	Junior	121	(6)
2023–2025	Sporting Kansas City	54	(4)
2026–	América de Cali	7	(4)
- * Club domestic league appearances and goals as of 12:14, 6 August 2026 (UTC)

Dany Alejandro Rosero Valencia (born 6 October 1993) is a Colombian professional footballer who plays as a centre-back for Categoría Primera A club América de Cali.

== Career statistics ==
As of match played 29 September 2024

Appearances and goals by club, season and competition
Club	Season	League			National cup (Note: Includes Copa Argentina, Copa Colombia, U.S. Open Cup)		Continental		Other		Total	
Club	Season	Division	Apps	Goals	Apps	Goals	Apps	Goals	Apps	Goals	Apps	Goals
Arsenal de Sarandí	2012-13	Argentine Primera División	0	0	1	0	—		0	0	1	0
Arsenal de Sarandí	2013-14	Argentine Primera División	1	0	0	0	0	0	0	0	1	0
Arsenal de Sarandí	2014	Argentine Primera División	0	0	0	0	1 (Note: Appearance(s) in Copa Libertadores)	0	—		1	0
Arsenal de Sarandí	2015	Argentine Primera División	15	0	1	0	1 (Note: Appearance(s) in Copa Sudamericana)	0	—		17	0
Arsenal de Sarandí	Total		16	0	2	0	2	0	0	0	20	0
Patriotas Boyacá	2016	Categoría Primera A	37	4	5	1	—		—		42	5
Deportivo Cali	2017	Categoría Primera A	26	0	9	0	3	0	—		38	0
Deportivo Cali	2018	Categoría Primera A	30	2	0	0	7	0	—		37	2
Deportivo Cali	2019	Categoría Primera A	44	5	7	2	4	0	—		55	7
Deportivo Cali	Total		100	7	16	2	14	0	0	0	130	9
Junior	2020	Categoría Primera A	13	2	1	0	11 (Note: Five appearances in Copa Libertadores, Six appearances in Copa Sudamericana)	0	2 (Note: Appearance(s) in Superliga Colombiana)	0	27	2
Junior	2021	Categoría Primera A	33	3	2	0	8 (Note: Seven appearances in Copa Libertadores, One appearance in Copa Sudamericana)	0	—		43	3
Junior	2022	Categoría Primera A	36	0	5	1	7	0	—		48	1
Junior	2023	Categoría Primera A	3	0	0	0	0	0	—		3	0
Junior	Total		85	5	8	1	26	0	2	0	121	6
Sporting Kansas City	2023	MLS	26	2	0	0	3 (Note: Appearance(s) in Leagues Cup)	1	4 (Note: Appearance(s) in MLS Cup playoffs)	0	33	3
Sporting Kansas City	2024	MLS	23	2	3	2	2	0	—		28	4
Sporting Kansas City	Total		49	4	3	2	5	1	4	0	61	7
Career total			287	20	34	6	47	1	6	0	374	27

== Honours ==
Junior

- Superliga Colombiana: 2020
