= Erik Thommy =

German footballer (born 1994)

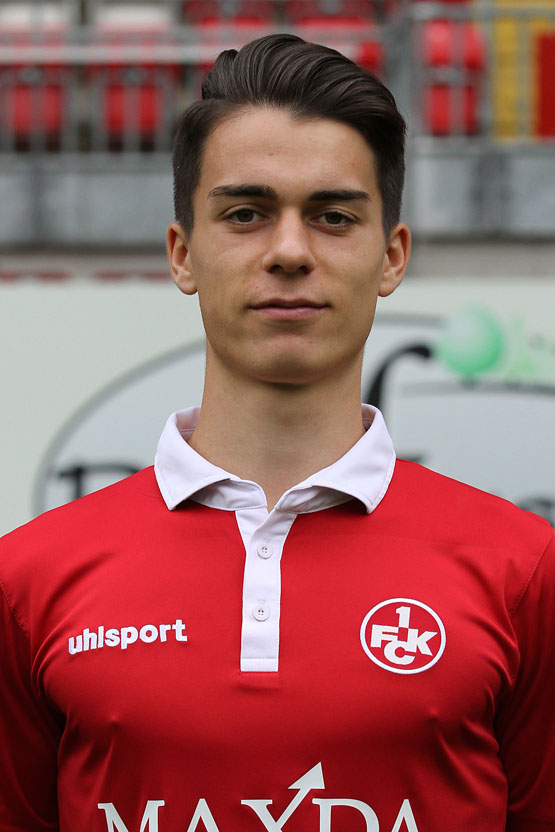
- Thommy with 1. FC Kaiserslautern in 2015

Personal information
- Date of birth: 20 August 1994 (age 32)
- Place of birth: Ulm, Germany
- Height: 1.74 m (5 ft 9 in)
- Positions: Midfielder; winger

Team information
- Current team: LA Galaxy
- Number: 27

Youth career
- 2000–2002: SV Kleinbeuren
- 2002–2009: SSV Ulm
- 2009–2010: TSG Thannhausen
- 2010–2013: FC Augsburg

Senior career*
Years	Team	Apps	(Gls)
2013–2016	FC Augsburg II	48	(22)
2014–2018	FC Augsburg	10	(0)
2015	→ 1. FC Kaiserslautern (loan)	6	(1)
2015	→ 1. FC Kaiserslautern II (loan)	4	(0)
2016–2017	→ Jahn Regensburg (loan)	37	(8)
2018–2022	VfB Stuttgart	52	(3)
2019–2021	VfB Stuttgart II	2	(1)
2019–2020	→ Fortuna Düsseldorf (loan)	34	(6)
2022–2025	Sporting Kansas City	101	(19)
2026–	LA Galaxy	0	(0)
- * Club domestic league appearances and goals as of 20:07, 23 October 2025 (UTC)

Erik Thommy (born 20 August 1994) is a German professional footballer who plays as a midfielder and winger.

== Club career ==
=== FC Augsburg ===
Thommy joined FC Augsburg in 2010 from TSG Thannhausen and SSV Ulm 1846. At 16 February 2014, he made his Bundesliga debut in a 0–1 home defeat against 1. FC Nürnberg. He appeared as an 82nd-minute substitute.

==== Kaiserslautern (loan) ====
In January 2015, Thommy was loaned to 2. Bundesliga club 1. FC Kaiserslautern for a year and a half until summer 2016. However, at the occasion of announcing his loan, FC Augsburg's general manager Stefan Reuter stated that Thommy still was a component of their future plans. Thommy was contracted with Augsburg until 2018. The loan was ended on 31 January 2016.

==== Jahn Regensburg (loan) ====
In the 2016 summer transfer window, he was loaned out again, this time to SSV Jahn Regensburg. He made his league debut and first start for Regensburg on 30 July 2016 in a 2–0 home victory over F.C. Hansa Rostock. He was subbed off in the 82nd minute, being replaced by Uwe Hesse.

=== Stuttgart ===
On 18 January 2018, Thommy moved to VfB Stuttgart. His debut and first competitive start for Stuttgart came on 3 February 2018 in a 1–1 away draw against VfL Wolfsburg. He scored his first Bundesliga goal on 24 February 2018 against Eintracht Frankfurt. On 19 August 2018, Thommy extended his contract with VfB Stuttgart until June 2022.

On 28 May 2022, Stuttgart announced that they would not extend Thommy's contract beyond the 2021-22 Bundesliga season.

==== Düsseldorf (loan) ====
On 10 July 2019, Fortuna Düsseldorf announced the signing of Thommy on loan until the end of 2019–20 season with an option to buy him permanently.

=== Sporting Kansas City ===
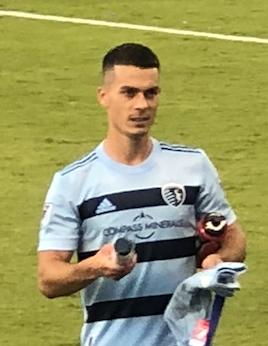
Thommy, with Sporting Kansas City in 2022

On 23 June 2022, it was announced that Thommy had signed with Major League Soccer side Sporting Kansas City on a deal until the end of the 2024 season. Thommy debuted for Kansas City on 23 July 2022, starting in a 0-2 loss to Los Angeles FC. Following the 2025 season, Kansas City opted to release him from the club.

== Career statistics ==
As of match played 6 February 2021

Appearances and goals by club, season and competition
Club	Season	League			Cup		Other		Total	
Club	Season	Division	Apps	Goals	Apps	Goals	Apps	Goals	Apps	Goals
FC Augsburg	2013–14	Bundesliga	1	0	0	0	—		1	0
FC Augsburg	2014–15	Bundesliga	3	0	1	0	—		4	0
FC Augsburg	2017–18	Bundesliga	6	0	1	0	—		7	0
FC Augsburg	Total		10	0	1	0	—		11	0
FC Augsburg II	2013–14	Regionalliga Bayern	31	18	—		—		31	18
FC Augsburg II	2014–15	Regionalliga Bayern	5	1	—		—		5	1
FC Augsburg II	2015–16	Regionalliga Bayern	12	3	—		2 (Note: Appearances in the Regionalliga promotion playoff.)	1	14	4
FC Augsburg II	Total		48	22	—		2	1	50	23
1. FC Kaiserslautern (loan)	2014–15	2. Bundesliga	4	1	0	0	—		4	1
1. FC Kaiserslautern (loan)	2015–16	2. Bundesliga	2	0	2	0	—		4	0
1. FC Kaiserslautern (loan)	Total		6	1	2	0	—		8	1
1. FC Kaiserslautern II (loan)	2014–15	Regionalliga Südwest	2	0	—		—		2	0
1. FC Kaiserslautern II (loan)	2015–16	Regionalliga Südwest	2	0	—		—		2	0
1. FC Kaiserslautern II (loan)	Total		4	0	—		—		4	0
Jahn Regensburg (loan)	2016–17	3. Liga	37	8	1	0	2 (Note: Appearances in the 3. Liga promotion playoff.)	0	40	8
VfB Stuttgart	2017–18	Bundesliga	14	2	0	0	—		14	2
VfB Stuttgart	2018–19	Bundesliga	19	1	1	0	—		20	1
VfB Stuttgart	2018–19	Bundesliga	2	0	0	0	—		2	0
VfB Stuttgart	Total		35	3	1	0	—		36	3
VfB Stuttgart II	2018–19	Regionalliga Südwest	1	0	—		—		1	0
VfB Stuttgart II	2020–21	Regionalliga Südwest	1	1	—		—		1	1
VfB Stuttgart II	Total		2	1	—		—		2	1
Fortuna Düsseldorf (loan)	2019–20	Bundesliga	34	6	3	0	—		37	6
Career total			176	41	8	0	4	1	173	38

Sporting positions
Preceded by Johnny Russell	Sporting Kansas City captain 2025	Succeeded by Vacant
