= Jake Davis (soccer) =

American soccer player (born 2002)

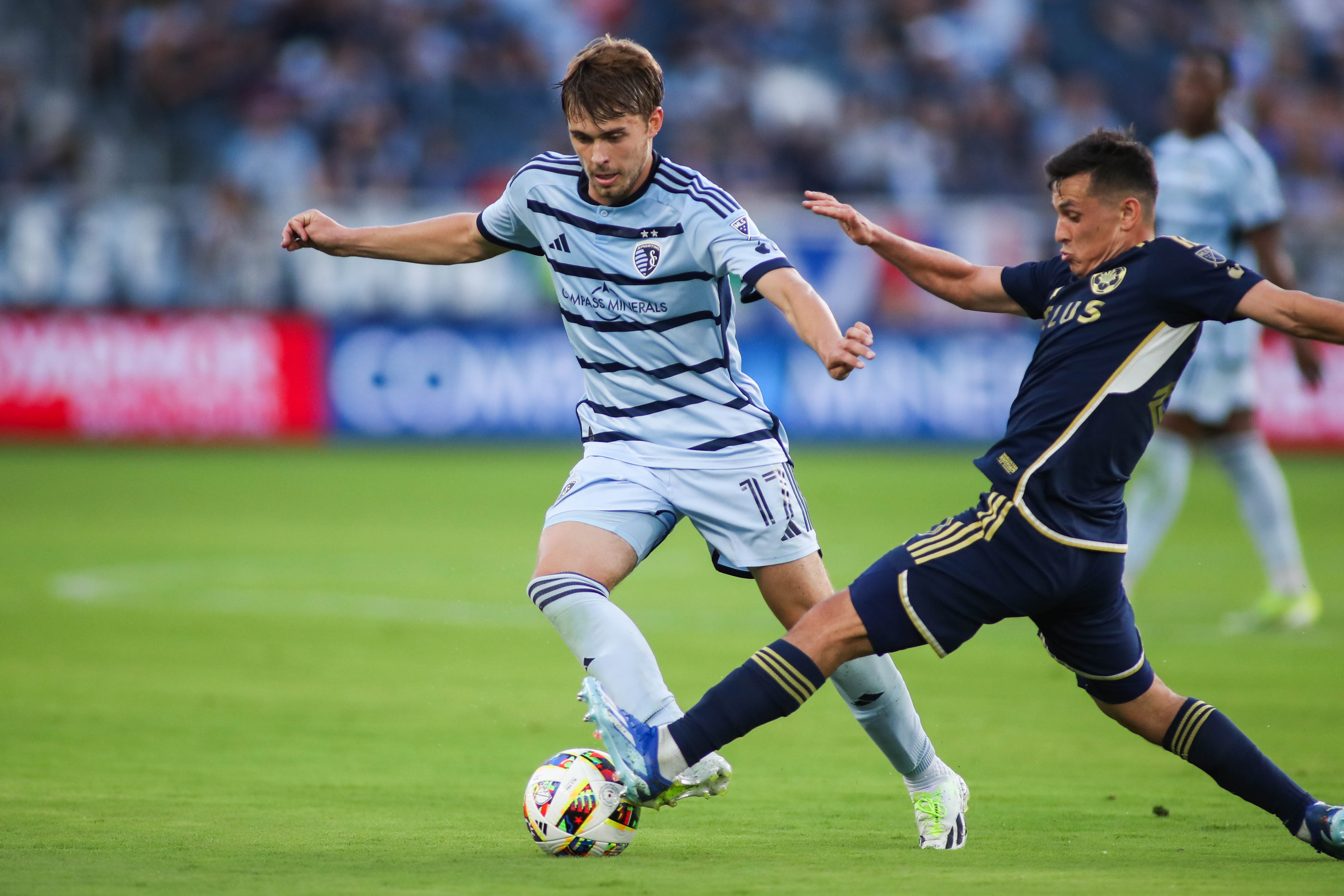
- Davis with Sporting Kansas City in 2024

Personal information
- Full name: Jacob Mifflin Davis
- Date of birth: January 3, 2002 (age 24)
- Place of birth: Rochester, Michigan, U.S.
- Height: 5 ft 10 in (1.77 m)
- Position: Right-back

Team information
- Current team: Sporting Kansas City
- Number: 8

Youth career
- 2017–2020: Sporting Kansas City

Senior career*
Years	Team	Apps	(Gls)
2019–2023	Sporting Kansas City II (Note: Formerly known as Swope Park Rangers until the 2020 season.)	62	(4)
2021–	Sporting Kansas City	85	(3)
- * Club domestic league appearances and goals as of October 23, 2025

Jacob Mifflin Davis (born January 3, 2002) is an American professional soccer player who plays as a right-back for Major League Soccer club Sporting Kansas City.

== Club career ==
Davis joined the Sporting Kansas City Academy in 2017, where he made a total of 54 appearances with eight goals with the club's U-17 and U-19 teams. Davis made his professional debut with Sporting Kansas City II on April 6, 2019, in a 4–3 loss against the Bethlehem Steel F.C., where he recorded an assist. On June 30, 2020, Davis again signed an academy contract to play with Sporting Kansas City II without forfeiting his NCAA eligibility.

On August 19, 2021, Davis signed a homegrown player contract with Sporting's Major League Soccer team.

Jake Davis signed a three-year contract extension with a 4th-year option on May 1, 2024.

== International career ==
Davis was called up to the United States U-23 men's national soccer team for the 2024 Summer Olympics as an alternate.
