= Logan Ndenbe =

Belgian footballer (born 2000)

Personal information
- Date of birth: 9 February 2000 (age 26)
- Place of birth: Mouscron, Belgium
- Height: 1.75 m (5 ft 9 in)
- Position: Left-back

Team information
- Current team: Nancy
- Number: 22

Youth career
- KV Oostende

Senior career*
Years	Team	Apps	(Gls)
2018–2020	KV Oostende	9	(0)
2020	Guingamp B	2	(0)
2020–2022	Guingamp	27	(0)
2022–2025	Sporting Kansas City	78	(1)
2026–	Nancy	0	(0)

International career^{‡}
2017	Belgium U17	8	(0)
2017–2018	Belgium U18	4	(0)
2021–2022	Belgium U21	7	(0)
- * Club domestic league appearances and goals as of 20:08, 23 October 2025 (UTC) ‡ National team caps and goals as of 20:28, 1 October 2022 (UTC)

Logan Ndenbe (born 9 February 2000) is a Belgian professional footballer who plays as a left-back for French Ligue 2 club Nancy.

== Life ==
Ndenbe was born in Belgium. He is of Cameroonian descent.

== Career ==
Ndenbe started his career at Mouscron. In 2017 he signed a deal with fellow Belgian club KV Oostende. He then made 3 appearances for the senior side before his departure for Guingamp.

On 14 January 2022, Ndenbe signed a 3-year deal with Major League Soccer club Sporting Kansas City. He is a youth international for Belgium. Following the 2025 season, Kansas City opted to release him from the club.

On 23 June 2026, Ndenbe signed a three-year contract with Nancy in French Ligue 2.
