= William Agada =

Nigerian footballer (born 1999)

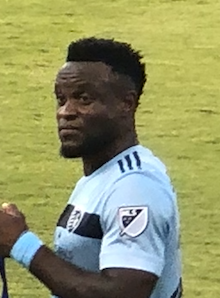
- Agada with Sporting Kansas City in 2022

Personal information
- Date of birth: 17 September 1999 (age 27)
- Place of birth: Bauchi, Nigeria
- Height: 1.76 m (5 ft 9 in)
- Position: Forward

Team information
- Current team: Hapoel Haifa
- Number: 9

Youth career
- –2017: Mighty Jets
- 2017: Hapoel Katamon
- 2017–2018: Maccabi Tel Aviv

Senior career*
| Years | Team | Apps | (Gls) |
| 2018–2020 | Hapoel Katamon | 66 | (23) |
| 2020–2022 | Hapoel Jerusalem | 31 | (8) |
| 2020–2021 | → Hapoel Haifa (loan) | 25 | (6) |
| 2022–2025 | Sporting Kansas City | 64 | (21) |
| 2025 | Real Salt Lake | 14 | (2) |
| 2026 | Zaragoza | 3 | (0) |
| 2026– | Hapoel Haifa | 3 | (0) |
- * Club domestic league appearances and goals as of 31 August 2026

William "Willy" Agada (born 17 September 1999) is a Nigerian professional footballer who plays as a forward for Hapoel Haifa.

== Career ==
Agada began his playing career with Mighty Jets of the Nigeria National League.

Agada started his international career in Hapoel Katamon Jerusalem's youth team in 2017/18 season. In the middle of the season he was loaned to Maccabi Tel Aviv youth team. Agada finished the season with a total of 22 league goals for both clubs.

In 2018–19 season he returned to Hapoel Katamon Jerusalem in the Israeli Liga Leumit, and completed two seasons with 8 and 15 league goals.

In 2020/21 season he moved to Hapoel Haifa on loan, and scored 6 league goals.
In 2021/22 Agada returned to Hapoel Katamon Jerusalem, that just changed its name to Hapoel Jerusalem. Agada scored 8 league goals, being the club top scorer, and helped the club staying in the first division.

At the end of 2021-22 season, Agada was transferred to Major League Soccer club Sporting Kansas City.

On 23 April 2025, Agada was traded to Real Salt Lake in exchange for up to $850,000 in General Allocation Money. On 26 January 2026, he signed for Real Zaragoza of the Spanish Segunda División until the end of the season.
