= 2021 Sporting Kansas City II season =

Sporting Kansas City II
2021 season
- General manager: Kurt Austin
- Head coach: Paulo Nagamura
- Stadium: Children's Mercy Park
- USL Championship: Central Div.: 8th Eastern Conf.: 14th
- USL Playoffs: TBD
- Biggest win: SKC 4–1 TUL (6/2); SKC 3–0 OKC (9/4)
- Biggest defeat: SKC 0–6 BIR (10/24)
Home colors	Away colors

The 2021 Sporting Kansas City II season was the club's second year under the name of Sporting Kansas City II, sixth year of play and their third season in the Eastern Conference of the USL Championship, the top tier of United Soccer League and the second tier of the United States Soccer Pyramid. The team will continue play at Children's Mercy Park.

Due to the ongoing COVID-19 pandemic, for the 2021 season, the league split each of the conferences further into two divisions, Atlantic and Central in the Eastern Conference and Mountain and Pacific in the Western Conference. During the regular season, each Central Division team will play its division opponents four times – twice home and twice away – for a total of 28 games. The remaining four games in SKC II's schedule will be played against regional or cross-conference opponents, namely Colorado, LA Galaxy II, El Paso, and Oakland.

== Roster ==
As of July 4, 2021

No.	Pos.	Nation	Player
13	DF	USA	Amadou Dia
16	DF	USA	Graham Smith
19	MF	USA	Grayson Barber
21	MF	USA	Felipe Hernández
22	GK	USA	Kendall McIntosh
23	FW	USA	Tyler Freeman
24	GK	USA	John Pulskamp
25	FW	USA	Ozzie Cisneros
26	DF	USA	Jaylin Lindsey
28	MF	USA	Cameron Duke
32	MF	USA	Christian Duke
33	DF	USA	Danny Barbir
34	FW	CRO	Dominik Rešetar (on loan from Dinamo Zagreb II)
37	FW	ENG	Jamil Roberts
39	DF	CRO	Petar Čuić (on loan from Dinamo Zagreb II)
42	GK	AUT	Remi Prieur
43	MF	USA	Bailey Sparks
44	FW	JAM	Rojay Smith
45	DF	USA	Travian Sousa
46	MF	USA	Jake Davis
47	DF	USA	Kayden Pierre
48	DF	USA	Kaveh Rad
49	DF	USA	Coby Jones
50	DF	CRO	Aljaž Džankić
55	GK	USA	Gavin Krenecki
56	MF	USA	Jayvin Van Deventer
65	DF	USA	Dylan Hooper
67	GK	MEX	Max Trejo
70	FW	GHA	Ropapa Mensah
71	DF	USA	Michael Lenis
77	FW	COD	Enoch Mushagalusa
84	DF	USA	Jahon Rad
88	DF	USA	Isaiah LeFlore
96	FW	USA	Wilson Harris
98	DF	CAN	Matt Constant

Signed to first team contract with MLS affiliate Sporting Kansas City.
Sporting Kansas City Academy player.

== Competitions ==
=== USL Championship ===
==== Central Division Standings ====
Pos	Team	Pld	W	L	T	GF	GA	GD	Pts	Qualification
1	Louisville City FC	32	18	7	7	61	37	+24	61	Advance to USL Championship Playoffs
2	Birmingham Legion FC	32	18	8	6	51	31	+20	60	Advance to USL Championship Playoffs
3	Memphis 901 FC	32	14	10	8	47	42	+5	50	Advance to USL Championship Playoffs
4	FC Tulsa	32	14	13	5	49	48	+1	47	Advance to USL Championship Playoffs
5	OKC Energy FC	32	8	11	13	30	38	−8	37	
6	Indy Eleven	32	9	15	8	32	47	−15	35	
7	Atlanta United 2	32	8	14	10	47	56	−9	34 (Note: The USL awarded a 3–0 win to Atlanta United 2 after Sporting Kansas City II fielded Jake Davis who was an ineligible player. The original score was 1–0 for Sporting Kansas City II.)	
8	Sporting Kansas City II	32	4	20	8	33	64	−31	20	

Source: USL

==== Match results ====
1 May 1	FC Tulsa	2–0	Sporting Kansas City II	Tulsa, Oklahoma
7pm CDT	da Costa 14'; Suarez 25'	Report		Stadium: ONEOK Field; Attendance: 4,241; Referee: Elijio Arreguin

7 May 2	Sporting Kansas City II	1–1	OKC Energy FC	Kansas City, KS
7:00 PM CDT	Ca. Duke (yellow card) 41'; J. Rad (yellow card) 55'; Freeman 84'; Cisneros (yellow card) 90+1'	Report	Sunday (yellow card) 14'; Basuljevic (yellow card) 58'; Lopez 70', (red card) 90+4'; Iida (yellow card) 79'	Stadium: Children's Mercy Park; Referee: Jon Freemon

14 May 3	Sporting Kansas City II	0–4	Colorado Springs Switchbacks FC	Kansas City, KS
7:00 PM CDT	Dia (yellow card) 18'; Čuić (yellow card) 34'; Constant (red card) 39'; Davis (yellow card) 45+2'; Ch. Duke (yellow card) 54'	Report	Dewing 7'; Barry 29' (pen.), (yellow card) 40', (goal) 64'; Ngalina 36' (pen.); Makangila (yellow card) 37'; Batista (yellow card) 52'; Edwards (yellow card) 59'; Ockford (yellow card) 90'	Stadium: Children's Mercy Park; Referee: Greg Dopka

19 May 4	LA Galaxy II	1–1	Sporting Kansas City II	Carson, California
9:30 PM CDT	Vázquez (yellow card) 42'; Hernandez 73'	Report	Čuić (yellow card) 23'; Rešetar 60'; Mushagalusa (yellow card) 82'	Stadium: Dignity Health Sports Park; Referee: Brad Jensen

22 May 5	Indy Eleven	2–0	Sporting Kansas City II	Indianapolis, Indiana
6:00 PM CDT	Hamilton 53'; Arteaga 65'	Report	Rešetar (yellow card) 48'	Stadium: Carroll Stadium; Attendance: 3,999; Referee: Matthew Corrigan

30 May 6	Sporting Kansas City II	0–0	El Paso Locomotive FC	Kansas City, KS
7:00 PM CDT	K. Rad (yellow card) 78'	Report	Borelli (yellow card) 67'; King (yellow card) 90+4'	Stadium: Children's Mercy Park; Referee: Elvis Osmanovic

2 June 7	Sporting Kansas City II	4–1	FC Tulsa	Kansas City, Kansas
7:00 PM CDT	K. Rad (yellow card) 41', (goal) 54'; Ca. Duke 45+3'; Barber 49'; Harris (yellow card) 55'; R. Smith 73'	Report	Coutinho 14'; Marlon (yellow card) 23'; Bird (yellow card) 71'; Kiesewetter (yellow card) 85'	Stadium: Children's Mercy Park; Referee: Matthew Thompson

9 June 8	Atlanta United 2	2–2	Sporting Kansas City II	Kennesaw, Georgia
6:30 PM	Kamdem Fewo 67'; Gannon 74'	Report	Mushagalusa 61', 69'	Stadium: Fifth Third Bank Stadium; Attendance: 1,421; Referee: Natalie Simon

16 June 9	FC Tulsa	4–3	Sporting Kansas City II	Tulsa, Oklahoma
7:00pm CDT	Kibato (yellow card) 18' da Costa 42'; Marlon 45', (yellow card) 45+2'; Suarez 62' (pen.); Rivas 72'; Ayagwa (yellow card) 90+5'	Report	R. Smith 7'; Džankić (yellow card) 34'; Rešetar (yellow card) 45+3'; Freeman 87', 90+4'	Stadium: ONEOK Field; Attendance: 3,690; Referee: Matthew Franz

20 June 10	Sporting Kansas City II	1–2	Indy Eleven	Kansas City, Kansas
5:00 PM	Mushagalusa 20'; Ch. Duke (yellow card) 90+2'	Report	Law (yellow card) 12', (goal) 19'; Wild 50'; Cochran (yellow card) 83'; Gutjahr (yellow card) 90+5'	Stadium: Children's Mercy Park; Referee: Adam Kilpatrick

23 June 11	OKC Energy FC	1–0	Sporting Kansas City II	Oklahoma City, OK
7:30 PM CDT	Bijev (penalty missed) 45+1, 45+1'; Ellis-Hayden (yellow card) 90+4'	Report	Barbir (yellow card) 90'	Stadium: Taft Stadium; Attendance: 1,721; Referee: Greg Dopka

26 June 12	Memphis 901 FC	2–3	Sporting Kansas City II	Memphis, TN
7:30 PM CDT	Dacres (yellow card) 32', (goal) 64'; Kissiedou (yellow card) 48'; Carroll (yellow card) 53'; Murphy 58'	Report	R. Smith 8'; G. Smith (yellow card) 39'; Mushagalusa (yellow card) 43', (goal) 55'; Čuić (yellow card) 59'; Barbir 72', (yellow card) 87'; Džankić (yellow card) 90+6'	Stadium: AutoZone Park; Attendance: 4,875; Referee: Jonathan Bilinski

2 July 13	Sporting Kansas City II	2–4	Louisville City FC	Kansas City, Kansas
7:00 PM CDT	Ch. Duke (yellow card) 21'; R. Smith 13'; Mushagalusa (yellow card) 42'; Jones 80'	Report	Greig 5', 67'; Ownby 57'; Souahy 59'; Davis IV (yellow card) 81'	Stadium: Children's Mercy Park; Referee: Kevin Fikar

10 July 14	Atlanta United 2	0–1	Sporting Kansas City II	Kennesaw, Georgia
6:30 PM CDT		Report	Mushagalusa 38'	Stadium: Fifth Third Bank Stadium; Attendance: 728; Referee: Izlen Peksenar

24 July 15	OKC Energy FC	0–0	Sporting Kansas City II	Oklahoma City, OK
7:30 PM CDT	Rogers (yellow card) 30'	Report	Ch. Duke (yellow card) 27'	Stadium: Taft Stadium; Attendance: 2,171; Referee: Matthew Franz

28 July 16	Sporting Kansas City II	1–2	Louisville City FC	Kansas City, Kansas
7:00 PM CDT	Ch. Duke (yellow card) 53'; Cisneros 89'; Mushagalusa (yellow card) 90+4'	Report	Gibson (yellow card) 6'; González 46'; Greig 56'; McMahon (yellow card) 72'	Stadium: Children's Mercy Park; Referee: Kevin Broadley

1 August 17	Sporting Kansas City II	1–2	Memphis 901 FC	Kansas City, Kansas
4:00 PM CDT	Harris 25' (pen.), (yellow card) 45'; K. Rad (yellow card) 90+2'	Report	Murphy 12'; Salazar 48'	Stadium: Children's Mercy Park; Referee: Mathew Corrigan

7 August 18	Louisville City FC	4–1	Sporting Kansas City II	Louisville, Kentucky
6:30 PM CDT	González 45+3'; Ownby 71'; Lancaster 75'; Matsoso (yellow card) 84'; Hoppenot (yellow card) 87'; McLaughlin 90+4'	Report	Jones (yellow card) 9'; Mushagalusa 68'; Davis (yellow card) 89'	Stadium: Lynn Family Stadium; Attendance: 10,470; Referee: Elton García

11 August 19	Birmingham Legion FC	4–2	Sporting Kansas City II	Birmingham, Alabama
7:00 PM	Brett 7'; Williams 70'; Flemmings 81'; Asiedu 90+1'	Report	Čuić 4'; Ch. Duke (yellow card) 68'; Roberts 74'; Barbir (yellow card) 90+3'	Stadium: BBVA Field; Referee: John Griggs

14 August 20	Sporting Kansas City II	1–4	Atlanta United 2	Kansas City, Kansas
4:00 PM	Davis (yellow card) 58'; Barbir 86'; J. Rad (yellow card) 90+1'	Report	Ab. Diop (yellow card) 36'; Matheus 39'; Wolff 47'; Goodrum 54', 74'; Macky Diop (yellow card) 76'; Allan (yellow card) 85'	Stadium: Children's Mercy Park; Referee: Jon Freemon

22 August 21	Sporting Kansas City II	1–1	Indy Eleven	Kansas City, Kansas
4:00 PM	Harris 40'; Barber (yellow card) 64'; Dia (yellow card) 88'	Report	Hamilton 51', (yellow card) 58'; Seagrist (yellow card) 69'	Stadium: Children's Mercy Park; Referee: Greg Dopka

29 August 22	Sporting Kansas City II	0–0	Memphis 901 FC	Kansas City, Kansas
4:00 PM CDT	Čuić (yellow card) 25'	Report	Murphy (yellow card) 54'; Oduro (yellow card) 64'; Winn (yellow card) 75'; Segbers (yellow card) 86'	Stadium: Children's Mercy Park; Referee: Jeremy Scheer

1 September 23	Sporting Kansas City II	0–1	Birmingham Legion FC	Kansas City, Kansas
7:00 PM CDT		Report	Kasim 42'; Lopez (yellow card) 63'; Williams (yellow card) 69'	Stadium: Children's Mercy Park; Referee: Brandon Stevis

4 September 24	Sporting Kansas City II	3–0	OKC Energy FC	Kansas City, Kansas
4:00 PM CDT	Cisneros 20', (yellow card) 58'; R. Smith 72'; Mushagalusa 79'; Davis (yellow card) 87'	Report	Batista (yellow card) 56'	Stadium: Children's Mercy Park; Referee: Malik Badawi

11 September 25	Indy Eleven	1–0	Sporting Kansas City II	Indianapolis, Indiana
6:00 PM CDT	Koffie (yellow card) 64'; Wild 77', (yellow card) 89'; Hackshaw (yellow card) 87'	Report	Čuić (yellow card) 90+3'	Stadium: Carroll Stadium; Attendance: 5,999; Referee: Jonathan Bilinski

24 September 26	Sporting Kansas City II	1–1	FC Tulsa	Kansas City, Kansas
7:00 PM CDT	Čuić (yellow card) 55'; Pierre 65'; Cisneros (yellow card) 87'	Report	Suárez 8' (pen.); Johnson (yellow card) 16'; Flanagan (yellow card) 88'; Da Costa (yellow card) 90+1'; Jadama (yellow card) 90+5'	Stadium: Children's Mercy Park; Referee: Kevin Fikar

1 October 27	Sporting Kansas City II	0–1	Birmingham Legion FC	Kansas City, Kansas
7:00 PM CDT	Davis (yellow card) 56'	Report	A. Crognale 10'; Lopez (yellow card) 52'	Stadium: Children's Mercy Park; Referee: DeShun Beard

6 October 28	Memphis 901 FC	3–1	Sporting Kansas City II	Memphis, TN
7:00 PM CDT	Murphy 20', (yellow card) 60', (goal) 74' (pen.); Paul (yellow card) 25'; Oduro (yellow card) 89'; Lamah 90+5'	Report	Mushagalusa 17'; K. Rad (yellow card) 39'; Davis (yellow card) 69'; McIntosh (yellow card) 73'; G. Smith (yellow card) 86'; Čuić (yellow card) 87'	Stadium: AutoZone Park; Attendance: 3,029; Referee: Danielle Chesky

9 October 29	Louisville City FC	4–3	Sporting Kansas City II	Louisville, Kentucky
7:30 PM ET	DelPiccolo 8'; Totsch (yellow card) 15'; Lancaster 30' (pen.), 90+4'; McLaughlin (yellow card) 82'; Jimenez 88'	Report	Davis (yellow card) 24', (goal) 45+1', 84'; Roberts 85'; Ch. Duke (yellow card) 90+3'	Stadium: Lynn Family Stadium; Attendance: 10,762; Referee: Nabil Bensalah

13 October 30	Sporting Kansas City II	0–3	Atlanta United 2	Kansas City, Kansas
7:00 PM	Davis (yellow card) 44'; Cisneros 69'; Mushagalusa (yellow card) 76'	Report	Bauer (yellow card) 79'; Matheus (yellow card) 90+3'	Stadium: Children's Mercy Park; Referee: Thomas Snyder
Note: Match forfeited by league to ATL due to Jake Davis' ineligibility (one match suspension for card accumulation).

24 October 31	Birmingham Legion FC	6–0	Sporting Kansas City II	Birmingham, Alabama
7:00 PM	Herivaux 4', (yellow card) 63'; Lapa 18', 39'; Brett 31'; Kavita (yellow card) 40'; Asiedu (yellow card) 45'; Flemmings 70'; Kasim 76'	Report	Lenis (yellow card) 86'	Stadium: BBVA Field; Referee: Greg Dopka

30 October 32	Oakland Roots SC	1–0	Sporting Kansas City II	Oakland, California
9:00 PM CDT	Enríquez 2'; Bokila (yellow card) 82'; Diaz (yellow card) 90+1'; Mbumba (yellow card) 90+4'	Report		Stadium: Laney College Football Stadium; Attendance: 5,508; Referee: William Hoffman

=== U.S. Open Cup ===
Due to their ownership by a higher division professional club (Sporting Kansas City), SKC II is one of 15 teams expressly forbidden from entering the Cup competition.

== See also ==
- Sporting Kansas City II
- 2021 in American soccer
- 2021 USL Championship season
