= 2023 Sporting Kansas City season =

Sporting Kansas City
2023 season
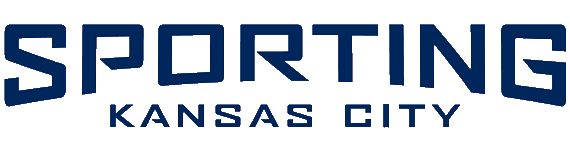
- Owner: Sporting Club
- Head coach: Peter Vermes
- Stadium: Children's Mercy Park
- MLS: Conference: 8th Overall: 15th
- Playoffs: Conference Semifinals
- U.S. Open Cup: Round of 32
- Average home league attendance: 18,616

The 2023 Sporting Kansas City season was the 28th season of the team's existence in Major League Soccer and the 13th year played under the Sporting Kansas City moniker.

== Roster ==
Note: Flags indicate national team as defined under FIFA eligibility rules; some limited exceptions apply. Players may hold more than one non-FIFA nationality. Squad correct as of April 24, 2023.

No.	Pos.	Nation	Player
1	GK	USA	John Pulskamp
3	DF	ESP	Andreu Fontas
4	DF	GER	Robert Voloder
5	DF	COL	Daniel Rosero
6	MF	SRB	Nemanja Radoja
7	FW	SCO	Johnny Russell (DP)
8	DF	USA	Graham Zusi
9	FW	MEX	Alan Pulido (DP)
10	MF	ISR	Gadi Kinda (DP)
11	FW	USA	Khiry Shelton
12	DF	USA	Kortne Ford (HGP)
14	DF	GER	Tim Leibold
15	MF	HON	Roger Espinoza
17	MF	USA	Jake Davis (HGP)
18	DF	BEL	Logan Ndenbe
19	DF	USA	Robert Castellanos
20	FW	HUN	Dániel Sallói (HGP)
21	MF	COL	Felipe Hernandez (HGP)
22	GK	USA	Kendall McIntosh
23	FW	NGA	William Agada
24	DF	USA	Kayden Pierre (HGP)
25	FW	USA	Ozzie Cisneros (HGP)
26	MF	GER	Erik Thommy
28	DF	USA	Cameron Duke (HGP)
29	GK	USA	Tim Melia
31	MF	USA	Danny Flores
54	MF	FRA	Remi Walter
77	FW	CYP	Marinos Tzionis
82	DF	USA	Chris Rindov

== Player movement ==
=== In ===
Per Major League Soccer and club policies terms of the deals do not get disclosed.

Date	Player	Position	Previous club	Fee/notes	Ref
October 26, 2022	(Serbia) Nemanja Radoja	MF	(Spain) Levante	Signed	
January 12, 2023	(Germany) Tim Leibold	DF	(Germany) Hamburger SV	Signed	
January 13, 2023	(United States) Danny Flores	MF	(United States) Oakland Roots	Signed via waivers	
February 17, 2023	(United States) Robert Castellanos	DF	(Finland) Kuopion Palloseura	Signed	
March 31, 2023	(Colombia) Dany Rosero	DF	(Colombia) Atlético Junior	Signed	

==== Draft picks ====
Draft picks are not automatically signed to the team roster. Only trades involving draft picks and executed after the start of 2023 MLS SuperDraft will be listed in the notes.

Round	Pick Number	Player	Position	School	Notes
1	8	(Canada) Stephen Afrifa	FW	FIU	Signed
2	37	(United States) Chris Rindov	DF	Maryland	Signed

=== Out ===
Date	Player	Position	Destination club	Notes	Ref
January 21, 2023	(Spain) Uri Rosell	MF	(United States) LA Galaxy	Waived, signed with LA Galaxy.	
November 15, 2022	(United States) Kaveh Rad	DF	(United States) Hartford Athletic	Option declined, signed with Hartford Athletic	
November 15, 2022	(France) Nicolas Isimat-Mirin	DF	(Netherlands) SBV Vitesse	Option declined, signed with SBV Vitesse	
April 4, 2023	(United States) Ben Sweat	DF	(United States) New England Revolution	Waived, signed by New England Revolution	

== Competitive ==
=== Major League Soccer ===
==== Standings ====
===== Western Conference =====
MLS Western Conference table (2023)
Pos	Team	Pld	W	L	T	GF	GA	GD	Pts	Qualification
6	Vancouver Whitecaps FC	34	12	10	12	55	48	+7	48	Qualification for round one
7	FC Dallas	34	11	10	13	41	37	+4	46	Qualification for round one
8	Sporting Kansas City	34	12	14	8	48	51	−3	44	Qualification for the wild-card round
9	San Jose Earthquakes	34	10	10	14	39	43	−4	44	Qualification for the wild-card round
10	Portland Timbers	34	11	13	10	46	58	−12	43	

Source: MLS
Rules for classification: 1) points; 2) total wins; 3) total goal differential; 4) total goals scored; 5) fewer disciplinary points; 6) away goal differential; 7) away goals scored; 8) home goals differential; 9) home goals scored; 10) coin toss (2 clubs tied) or drawing of lots (≥3 clubs tied)

===== Overall table =====
Overall MLS standings table
Pos	Team	Pld	W	L	T	GF	GA	GD	Pts	Qualification
13	Vancouver Whitecaps FC (V)	34	12	10	12	55	48	+7	48	Qualification for the CONCACAF Champions Cup Round One (Note: As 2023 Canadian Championship winners)
14	FC Dallas	34	11	10	13	41	37	+4	46	Qualification for the U.S. Open Cup Round of 32 (Note: As one of the top seven teams in the overall table to not qualify for the 2024 CONCACAF Champions Cup)
15	Sporting Kansas City	34	12	14	8	48	51	−3	44	Qualification for the U.S. Open Cup Round of 32
16	San Jose Earthquakes	34	10	10	14	39	43	−4	44	Qualification for the U.S. Open Cup Round of 32
17	New York Red Bulls	34	11	13	10	36	39	−3	43	

Source: MLS
Rules for classification: 1) points; 2) total wins; 3) total goal differential; 4) total goals scored; 5) fewer disciplinary points; 6) away goal differential; 7) away goals scored; 8) home goals differential; 9) home goals scored; 10) coin toss (2 clubs tied) or drawing of lots (≥3 clubs tied)
(V) Canadian Championship winner

==== Match results ====
February 27 1	Portland Timbers	1–0	Sporting Kansas City	Portland, Oregon
9:30 PM CST	Mosquera 6' (Chará); Zuparic (yellow card) 26'; Williamson (yellow card) 73'; Evander (yellow card) 89'	Report	Thommy (yellow card) 16'	Stadium: Providence Park; Attendance: 22,295; Referee: Timothy Ford
Note: Originally scheduled for February 25, but was postponed due to poor weather in Portland

March 4 2	Colorado Rapids	0–0	Sporting Kansas City	Commerce City, Colorado
8:30 PM CST	Abubakar (yellow card) 3'; Cabral (yellow card) 69'	Report	Espinoza (yellow card) 58'	Stadium: Dick's Sporting Goods Park; Attendance: 14,954; Referee: Allen Chapman

March 11 3	Sporting Kansas City	0–0	LA Galaxy	Kansas City, Kansas
7:30 PM CST		Report		Stadium: Children's Mercy Park; Attendance: 18,612; Referee: Armando Villarreal

March 18 4	FC Dallas	2–1	Sporting Kansas City	Frisco, Texas
7:30 PM CST	Velasco 55'; Paes (yellow card) 62'; Twumasi (yellow card) 76'; Ferreira 84'	Report	Sallói 11'; Voloder (yellow card) 78'	Stadium: Toyota Stadium; Attendance: 17,467; Referee: Pierre-Luc Lauziere

March 25 5	Sporting Kansas City	1–4	Seattle Sounders FC	Kansas City, Kansas
7:30 PM CST	Agada 5'; Sweat (yellow card) 53' (yellow-red card) 63'	Report	Morris 23', 54', 69', 77'	Stadium: Children's Mercy Park; Attendance: 18,629; Referee: Alex Chilowicz

April 1 6	Philadelphia Union	0–0	Sporting Kansas City	Chester, Pennsylvania
7:30 PM CDT	Harriel (yellow card) 18'; Gazdag (yellow card) 40'; Martínez (yellow card) 72'	Report	Agada (yellow card) 16'; Walter (yellow card) 90+5'	Stadium: Subaru Park; Attendance: 18,550; Referee: Victor Rivas

April 8 7	Sporting Kansas City	0–1	Colorado Rapids	Kansas City, Kansas
7:30 PM CDT	Rosero (yellow card) 35'; Thommy (yellow card) 76'	Report	Max (yellow card) 37'; Wilson (yellow card) 58'; Rubio 68'; Nicholson (yellow card) 71'; Acosta (yellow card) 74'	Stadium: Children's Mercy Park; Attendance: 18,467; Referee: Joseph Dickerson

April 15 8	San Jose Earthquakes	3–0	Sporting Kansas City	San Jose, California
5:30 PM CDT	Espinoza 9', (yellow card) 59'; Ebobisse 40' (pen.), 51'; Gruezo (yellow card) 77'	Report	Thommy (yellow card) 31'; Castellanos (red card) 90+3'	Stadium: PayPal Park; Attendance: 14,212; Referee: Timothy Ford

April 22 9	New England Revolution	2–1	Sporting Kansas City	Foxborough, Massachusetts
6:30 PM CDT	Vrioni 31' (35)	Report	Fontàs (yellow card) 20' (yellow-red card) 61'; Russell 50'; Voloder (yellow card) 89'	Stadium: Gillette Stadium; Attendance: 19,281; Referee: Nima Saghafi

April 29 10	Sporting Kansas City	0–2	CF Montréal	Kansas City, Kansas
7:30 PM CDT	Rosero (yellow card) 30'; Pulido (yellow card) 52'; Espinoza (yellow card) 57'	Report	Wanyama (yellow card) 27'; Duke 35'; Choinière 45+1' (yellow card) 90+6'; Waterman (yellow card) 65'	Stadium: Children's Mercy Park; Attendance: 18,226; Referee: Ramy Touchan

May 7 11	Seattle Sounders FC	1–2	Sporting Kansas City	Seattle, Washington
3:30 PM CDT	Roldán (yellow card) 8'; Lodeiro 66' (pen.); Rusnák (yellow card) 81'	Report	Thommy 4'; Walter (yellow card) 12'; Pulido 31'; Ndenbe (yellow card) 65'; Russell (yellow card) 90+5'	Stadium: Lumen Field; Attendance: 31,620; Referee: Victor Rivas

May 13 12	Sporting Kansas City	3–0	Minnesota United FC	Kansas City, Kansas
7:30 PM CDT	Tapias (yellow card) 36'; Boxall (yellow card) 66'	Report	Rosero 9' (yellow card) 21'; Sallói 22'; Kinda 84'	Stadium: Children's Mercy Park; Attendance: 17,851; Referee: Alex Chilowicz

May 17 13	Los Angeles FC	1–1	Sporting Kansas City	Los Angeles, California
9:30 PM CDT	Bouanga 13'; Sánchez (yellow card) 29'; Palacios (yellow card) 40'; Tillman (yellow card) 70'	Report	Russell 20'; Sallói (yellow card) 90+4'	Stadium: BMO Stadium; Attendance: 22,222; Referee: Armando Villarreal

May 20 14	St. Louis City SC	4–0	Sporting Kansas City	St. Louis, Missouri
8:30 PM CDT	Löwen 19'; Vassilev 25', 75'; Nerwinski (yellow card) 30'; Gioacchini 55'	Report	Kinda (yellow card) 28'; Sallói (yellow card) 42'	Stadium: CityPark; Attendance: 22,423; Referee: Chris Penso

May 28 15	Sporting Kansas City	4–1	Portland Timbers	Kansas City, Kansas
2:00 PM CDT	Thommy 11'; Fontàs (yellow card) 47'; Sallói 66'; Mabiala 68' (o.g.); Radoja (yellow card) 72'; Shelton (yellow card) 85'; Hernández 90+3'	Report	Boli 8'; Loría (yellow card) 89'	Stadium: Children's Mercy Park; Attendance: 18,514; Referee: Rubiel Vazquez

May 31 16	Sporting Kansas City	2–1	FC Dallas	Kansas City, Kansas
7:30 PM CDT	Ndenbe (yellow card) 37'; Kinda 41'; Sallói 60'	Report	Ferreira 90+1'; Cerrillo (yellow card) 90+3'	Stadium: Children's Mercy Park; Attendance: 17,178; Referee: Guido Gonzales Jr.
Note: Delayed start due to inclement weather

June 3 17	Vancouver Whitecaps FC	1–1	Sporting Kansas City	Vancouver, British Columbia
9:30 PM CDT	White (yellow card) 39'; Blackmon (yellow card) 63'; Cubas (yellow card) 69'; Gauld (yellow card) 78' (goal) 88'; Sartini (yellow card) 86'	Report	Castellanos (yellow card) 7'; Pulido 20'; Kinda (yellow card) 79'; McIntosh (yellow card) 90+5'	Stadium: BC Place; Attendance: 13,739; Referee: Lukasz Szpala

June 10 18	Sporting Kansas City	4–1	Austin FC	Kansas City, Kansas
7:30 PM CDT	Pulido 19', 57'; Castellanos 47'; Radoja (yellow card) 61'; Thommy (yellow card) 87'; Shelton 89'	Report	Cascante (yellow card) 52'; Zardes (yellow card) 60'; Driussi 61'	Stadium: Children's Mercy Park; Attendance: 18,885; Referee: Marcos de Oliveira

June 17 19	Sporting Kansas City	1–2	Los Angeles FC	Kansas City, Kansas
7:30 PM CDT	Pulido 17' (pen.); Rosero (yellow card) 50'	Report	Maldonado 48'; Bogusz (yellow card) 59'; Biuk (yellow card) 65'; Vela 90'	Stadium: Children's Mercy Park; Attendance: 19,410; Referee: Rosendo Mendoza

June 21 20	LA Galaxy	2–2	Sporting Kansas City	Carson, California
9:30 PM CDT	Cáceres 24'; Judd 64'; Aguirre (yellow card) 90'	Report	Pulido 12', 90+1' (pen.); Thommy (yellow card) 17'; Rosero (yellow card) 23'	Stadium: Dignity Health Sports Park; Attendance: 20,960; Referee: Filip Dujic

June 24 21	Sporting Kansas City	0–1	Chicago Fire FC	Kansas City, Kansas
7:30 PM CDT	Shelton (yellow card) 88'; Sallói (yellow card) 90+2'	Report	Czichos (yellow card) 38'; Herbers 47'; Pineda (yellow card) 64'; Souquet (yellow card) 67'	Stadium: Children's Mercy Park; Attendance: 18,032; Referee: Alex Chilowicz

July 1 22	Sporting Kansas City	3–0	Vancouver Whitecaps FC	Kansas City, Kansas
7:30 PM CDT	Walter 33'; Pulido 45+2'; Thommy 53', (yellow card) 57'; Davis (yellow card) 89'	Report	Berhalter (yellow card) 66'	Stadium: Children's Mercy Park; Attendance: 18,867; Referee: Malik Badawi

July 8 23	Houston Dynamo FC	2–2	Sporting Kansas City	Houston, Texas
7:30 PM CDT	Aliyu 45+2'; Úlfarsson (yellow card) 49'; Herrera (yellow card) 50'; Franco 90+8'; Ferreira (yellow card) 90+10'	Report	Pulido 25', 62' (pen.); Rosero (yellow card) 65'; Leibold (yellow card) 90+11'	Stadium: Shell Energy Stadium; Attendance: 16,489; Referee: Nima Saghafi

July 12 24	Sporting Kansas City	2–2	Real Salt Lake	Kansas City, Kansas
7:30 PM CDT	Sallói 30'; Russell 36'	Report	Musovski 46'; Arango (yellow card) 67'; Julio 72'; Ruiz (yellow card) 87'	Stadium: Children's Mercy Park; Attendance: 17,924; Referee: Rubiel Vazquez

July 15 25	Austin FC	2–1	Sporting Kansas City	Austin, Texas
7:30 PM CDT	Zardes 17'; Finlay 19'; Cascante (yellow card) 59'	Report	Fontàs (yellow card) 8'; Rosero 33'; Davis (yellow card) 53'	Stadium: Q2 Stadium; Attendance: 20,738; Referee: Ted Unkel

August 26 26	Sporting Kansas City	3–0	San Jose Earthquakes	Kansas City, Kansas
7:30 PM CDT	Sallói 3'; Russell 42'; Thommy 69'	Report		Stadium: Children's Mercy Park; Attendance: 18,892; Referee: Pierre-Luc Lauziere

September 2 27	Sporting Kansas City	2–1	St. Louis City SC	Kansas City, Kansas
7:30 PM CDT	Pulido 31', 44', (yellow card) 71'; Melia (yellow card) 86'; Espinoza (yellow card) 90+7'	Report	Adeniran 22'; Alm (yellow card) 81'; Klauss (yellow card) 89'	Stadium: Children's Mercy Park; Attendance: 21,650; Referee: Allen Chapman

September 9 28	Inter Miami CF	3–2	Sporting Kansas City	Fort Lauderdale, Florida
6:30 PM CDT	Campana 25' (pen.), 45'; Farías 60'; Avilés (yellow card) 66'; Alba (yellow card) 90+3'	Report	Sallói 9'; Gutiérrez (yellow card) 33'; Pulido 78'; Leibold (yellow card) 79'	Stadium: DRV PNK Stadium; Attendance: 19,355; Referee: Ismail Elfath

September 16 29	Minnesota United FC	0–1	Sporting Kansas City	Saint Paul, Minnesota
7:30 PM CDT	Taylor (yellow card) 24'	Report	Fontàs (yellow card) 44'; Kinda 84' (yellow card) 90+5'; Sallói (yellow card) 90+1'	Stadium: Allianz Field; Attendance: 19,685; Referee: Tori Penso

September 20 30	Sporting Kansas City	0–3	Nashville SC	Kansas City, Kansas
7:30 PM CDT	Rosero (yellow card) 90+4'	Report	Picault 29'; Muyl (yellow card) 52'; Mukhtar 66'; Maher 76'; Washington (yellow card) 82'; Moore (yellow card) 90+1'	Stadium: Children's Mercy Park; Attendance: 16,825; Referee: Victor Rivas

September 23 31	Sporting Kansas City	2–1	Houston Dynamo FC	Kansas City, Kansas
7:30 PM CDT	Russell 7' (pen.), (red card) 39'; Radoja (yellow card) 34'; Agada 45+6'; Thommy (yellow card) 73'; Rosero (yellow card) 89'; Sallói (yellow card) 90+6'	Report	Escobar (yellow card) 45+1'; Hadebe 45+9'; Dorsey (yellow card) 74'; Caicedo (yellow card) 83'	Stadium: Children's Mercy Park; Attendance: 18,033; Referee: Chris Penso

September 30 32	St. Louis City SC	4–1	Sporting Kansas City	St. Louis, Missouri
7:30 PM CDT	Markanich (yellow card) 41'; Adeniran 73'; Stroud 75'; Klauss 80', 85'; Parker (yellow card) 87'	Report	Agada 90+3'	Stadium: CityPark; Attendance: 22,423; Referee: Armando Villarreal

October 7 33	Real Salt Lake	2–3	Sporting Kansas City	Sandy, Utah
8:30 PM CDT	Glad (red card) 3'; Vera (yellow card) 58', (goal) 81'; Savarino 89'; MacMath (yellow card) 90+7'	Report	Thommy 4'; Russell 29'; Radoja (yellow card) 38'; Pulido 77'; Melia (yellow card) 90+2'	Stadium: America First Field; Attendance: 21,205; Referee: Ted Unkel

October 21 34	Sporting Kansas City	3–1	Minnesota United FC	Kansas City, Kansas
8:00 PM CDT	Russell 28', 78'; Walter 31'; Davis (yellow card) 85'	Report	Trapp (yellow card) 53'; Taylor (yellow card) 66'; Boxall (yellow card) 68' (goal) 82'	Stadium: Children's Mercy Park; Attendance: 20,479; Referee: Ismail Elfath

=== MLS Cup Playoffs ===
October 25 Wild Card	Sporting Kansas City	0–0 (4–2 p)	San Jose Earthquakes	Kansas City, Kansas
8:30 pm CDT	Fontàs (yellow card) 59'	Report	Hoppe (yellow card) 55'; Skahan (yellow card) 80'; Judson (yellow card) 87'	Stadium: Children's Mercy Park; Attendance: 17,437; Referee: Allen Chapman
	Penalties
	Russell (penalty scored); Pulido (penalty missed); Thommy (penalty scored); Kinda (penalty scored); Sallói (penalty scored)		(penalty missed) Espinoza; (penalty missed) Yueill; (penalty scored) Skahan; (penalty scored) Akapo

October 29 Round One	St. Louis City SC	1–4	Sporting Kansas City	St. Louis, Missouri
9:00 pm CDT	Parker 28'; Jackson (yellow card) 45'; Stroud (yellow card) 58'; Löwen (yellow card) 70'; Blom (yellow card) 78'; Adeniran (yellow card) 87'	Report	Kinda (yellow card) 15', (goal) 39'; Ndenbe 27'; Walter 36'; Sallói 61'	Stadium: CityPark; Attendance: 22,423; Referee: Ted Unkel

November 5 Round One	Sporting Kansas City	2–1	St. Louis City SC	Kansas City, Kansas
4:00 pm CST	Pulido (yellow card) 42'; Ndenbe 45+1', (yellow card) 69'; Sallói 73'; Rosero (yellow card) 81'; Espinoza (yellow card) 90+14'	Report	Löwen (yellow card) 23'; Parker (yellow card) 32'; Pompeu 86'; Hiebert (yellow card) 90+6'	Stadium: Children's Mercy Park; Attendance: 21,650; Referee: Ismail Elfath
Note: Sporting Kansas City won the series 2–0.

November 26 Conference semifinals	Houston Dynamo FC	1–0	Sporting Kansas City	Houston, Texas
6:00 pm CST	Escobar 39'; Carrasquilla (yellow card) 69'	Report	Leibold (yellow card) 78'	Stadium: Shell Energy Stadium; Attendance: 20,319; Referee: Guido Gonzales Jr.

=== US Open Cup ===
April 25 Third Round	Sporting Kansas City (MLS)	3–0	(Oklahoma) Tulsa Athletic (NPSL)	Kansas City, Kansas
7:30 PM CDT	Sallói 32'; Pulido 54'; Tzionis 68'	Report	Torres (yellow card) 59'; Ugbah (yellow card) 64'; Harris (yellow card) 90+2'	Stadium: Children's Mercy Park; Attendance: 9,912; Referee: José Lara

May 10 Round of 32	Houston Dynamo FC (MLS) (Texas)	1–0	Sporting Kansas City (MLS)	Houston, Texas
7:30 PM CDT	Úlfarsson 12'; Gasper (red card) 35'; Dorsey (yellow card) 87'	Report	Espinoza (yellow card) 10'; Sallói (yellow card) 90+3'	Stadium: Shell Energy Stadium; Attendance: 5,094; Referee: Sergii Demianchuk

=== 2023 Leagues Cup ===
July 23 G1	FC Cincinnati (United States)	3–3 (4–2 p)	(United States) Sporting Kansas City	Cincinnati, Ohio
7:30 pm ET	Murphy (yellow card) 10'; Mosquera (yellow card) 11'; Pulskamp 34' (o.g.); Moreno (yellow card) 48'; Boupendza (yellow card) 50'; Vazquez 56'; Powell (yellow card) 68'; Acosta 90+8' (pen.)	Report	Hagglund 9' (o.g.); Rosero 12', (yellow card) 90+6'; Pulido (red card) 30'; Kinda (yellow card) 51', (goal) 69' (pen.); Pulskamp (yellow card) 83'; Thommy (yellow card) 90+2'; Espinoza (yellow card) 90+8'	Stadium: TQL Stadium; Attendance: 24,524; Referee: Daniel Quintero Huitrón
	Penalties
	Acosta (penalty scored); Vazquez (penalty scored); Kubo (penalty scored); Miazga (penalty scored)		(penalty scored) Thommy; (penalty scored) Shelton; (penalty missed) Walter; (penalty missed) Fontas

July 31 G2	Sporting Kansas City (United States)	1–0	(Mexico) Chivas	Kansas City, Kansas
10:00 pm ET	Russell 27'	Report	Gutierez (yellow card) 56'; Vazquez (yellow card) 67'; Calderón (yellow card) 85'	Stadium: Children's Mercy Park; Attendance: 20,373; Referee: Lukasz Szpala

August 4 R32	Sporting Kansas City (United States)	1–4	(Mexico) Toluca	Kansas City, Kansas
9:00 pm ET	Gutiérrez (yellow card) 19'; Agada 88'	Report	Rosero 29' (o.g.); Raul 32', (yellow card) 61'; Morales 54', (yellow card) 61'; Domínguez 63'	Stadium: Children's Mercy Park; Attendance: 15,121; Referee: Jorge Abraham Camacho
