= Jaylin Lindsey =

American soccer player (born 2000)

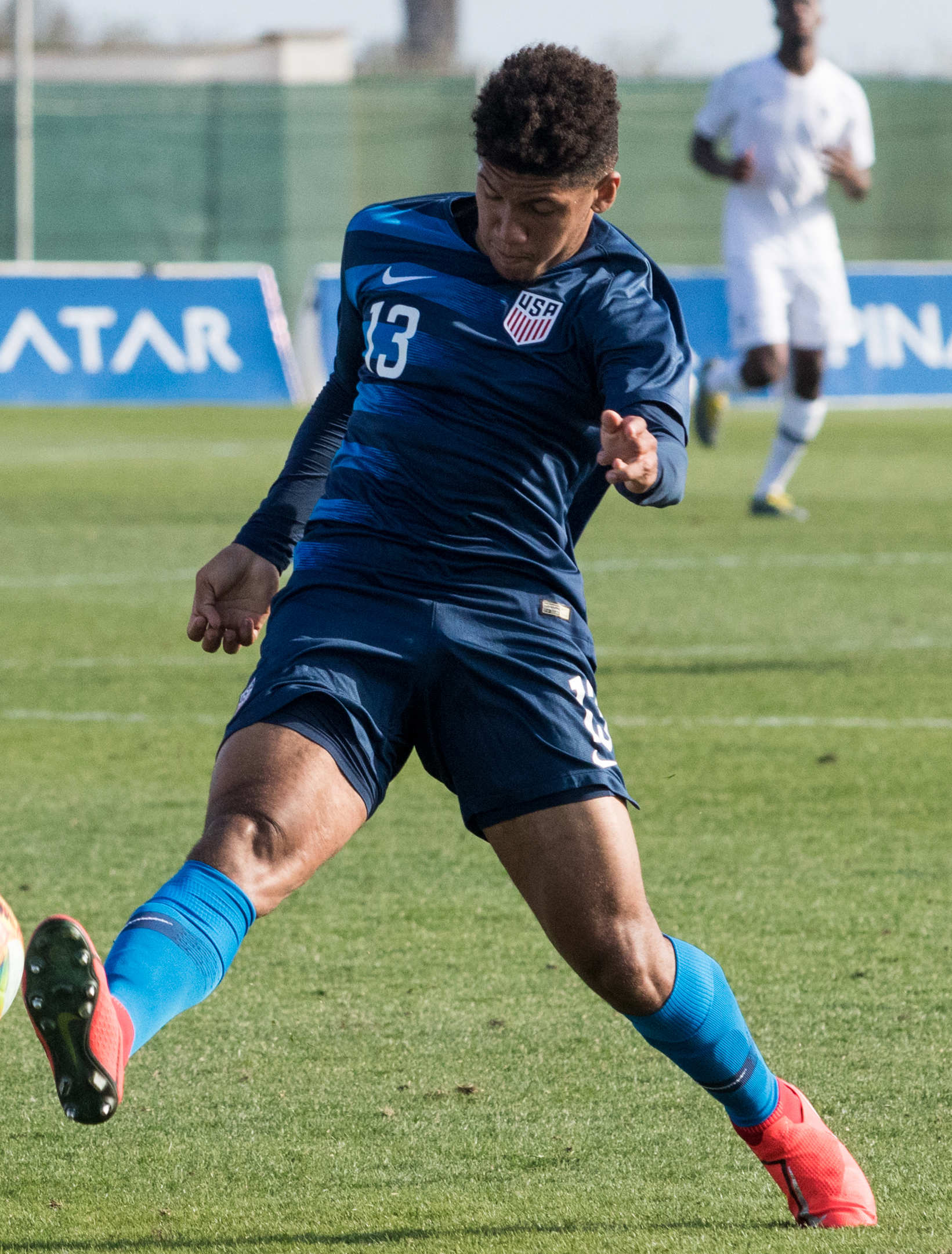
- Lindsey with the United States U20 in 2019

Personal information
- Full name: Jaylin Chad Lindsey
- Date of birth: March 27, 2000 (age 26)
- Place of birth: Charlotte, North Carolina, United States
- Height: 5 ft 8 in (1.73 m)
- Position: Right-back

Team information
- Current team: Orange County SC

Youth career
- Charlotte Soccer Academy
- 2015–2017: Sporting Kansas City

Senior career*
Years	Team	Apps	(Gls)
2016–2021	Sporting Kansas City II	26	(0)
2017–2021	Sporting Kansas City	34	(2)
2022–2024	Charlotte FC	53	(1)
2024	→ Crown Legacy FC (loan)	5	(0)
2025	New Mexico United	29	(1)
2026–	Orange County SC	7	(0)

International career^{‡}
2015	United States U15	5	(0)
2015–2017	United States U17	31	(0)
2018–2019	United States U20	7	(0)
- * Club domestic league appearances and goals as of 13:56, 10 November 2026 (UTC) ‡ National team caps and goals as of November 10, 2018

Jaylin Chad Lindsey (born March 27, 2000) is an American professional soccer player who last played as a right-back for Orange County SC in the USL Championship.

== Club career ==
Born in Charlotte, North Carolina, Lindsey joined the Sporting Kansas City academy setup in January 2015. Lindsey spent the 2015–16 academy season alternating between Sporting Kansas City's under-18 and under-16 sides. In 2016, Lindsey started to train with Sporting Kansas City's first-team as well as their United Soccer League affiliate, Swope Park Rangers. He spent time with the Rangers during their two-week pre-season camp in Tucson, Arizona, playing 68 minutes in a scrimmage match against the Tulsa Golden Hurricane.

On May 6, 2016, it was announced that Lindsey had signed an academy contract with Swope Park Rangers, meaning that he could play in USL matches for the side without losing his NCAA eligibility. Two days later, on May 8, Lindsey made his professional debut for the club in the league against Saint Louis FC. He came on as an 85th-minute substitute for Ualefi as Swope Park Rangers lost 3–0. In making his debut for Swope Park, Lindsey became the first American soccer player born in the year 2000 and beyond to make a professional appearance in a competitive match.

In 2017, Lindsey spent time in the Sporting Kansas City academy and with the United States under-17 side, before signing a Homegrown Player contract with Sporting Kansas City on September 15, 2017, ahead of the 2018 season. He attended Blue Valley West High School and graduated in 2018.

Lindsey made his Sporting Kansas City debut as a substitute in a 4–1 victory over Minnesota United FC at Children's Mercy Park on June 3, 2018, before earning his first start three days later in a 2–0 win against Real Salt Lake at Rio Tinto Stadium in the Lamar Hunt U.S. Open Cup Fourth Round. Lindsey recorded his first professional assist when he helped set up Johnny Russell's goal in a 3–2 loss to the New York Red Bulls at Red Bull Arena on July 14, 2018.

On December 12, 2021, Lindsey was traded to Charlotte FC in exchange for an initial $100,000 in allocation money, which could rise to as much as $325,000. Charlotte declined his contract option following their 2024 season.

On February 27, 2025, New Mexico United announced that Lindsey had signed with the club for the 2025 USL Championship season.

In August 2026, Orange County SC announced they had signed Lindsey to a contract for the remainder of the 2026 USL Championship season.

== International career ==
Lindsey has represented the United States at the under-14, under-15, and under-17 level.

== Career statistics ==
=== Club ===
As of match played July 14, 2024

Club	League	Season	League		Playoffs		National cup		Continental (Note: Includes CONCACAF Champions League)		Other (Note: Includes Leagues Cup)		Total	
Club	League	Season	Apps	Goals	Apps	Goals	Apps	Goals	Apps	Goals	Apps	Goals	Apps	Goals
Sporting Kansas City II	USL	2016	2	0	—		—		—		—		2	0
Sporting Kansas City II	USL	2018	6	0	—		—		—		—		6	0
Sporting Kansas City II	USL	2019	14	0	—		—		—		—		14	0
Sporting Kansas City II	USL	2020	1	0	—		—		—		—		1	0
Sporting Kansas City II	USL	2021	3	0	—		—		—		—		3	0
Sporting Kansas City II	Total		26	0	—		—		—		—		26	0
Sporting Kansas City	Major League Soccer	2018	7	0	—		3	0	—		—		10	0
Sporting Kansas City	Major League Soccer	2019	1	0	—		—		1	0	—		2	0
Sporting Kansas City	Major League Soccer	2020	12	0	2	0	—		—		—		14	0
Sporting Kansas City	Major League Soccer	2021	14	2	—		—		1	0	—		15	2
Sporting Kansas City	Total		34	2	2	0	3	0	2	0	—		41	2
Charlotte FC	MLS	2022	26	0	—		1	0	—		—		27	0
Charlotte FC	MLS	2023	21	1	—		3	0	—		5	0	29	1
Charlotte FC	MLS	2024	6	0	—		0	0	—		—		6	0
Charlotte FC	Total		53	1	0	0	4	0	0	0	5	0	62	1
Career Total			113	3	2	0	7	0	2	0	5	0	129	3

== Honors ==
United States U20

- CONCACAF U-20 Championship: 2018
