= 2021 Sporting Kansas City season =

Sporting Kansas City
2021 season
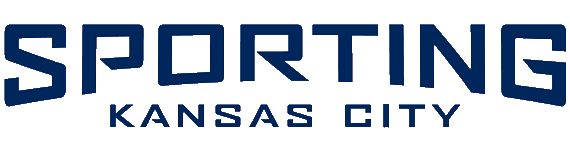
- Owner: Sporting Club
- Head coach: Peter Vermes
- Stadium: Children's Mercy Park
- MLS: Conference: 3rd Overall: 4th
- Playoffs: Conference Semifinals
- U.S. Open Cup: Canceled
- Leagues Cup: Quarter-finals
- Highest home attendance: League/All: 20,213 (6/26 v. LAFC)
- Lowest home attendance: League/All: 16,888 (9/15 v. MIN)
- Average home league attendance: League/All: 18,837
- Biggest win: SKC 4–0 MIN (9/15)
- Biggest defeat: All: SKC 1–6 LEÓN (8/10, LC QF); League: LAFC 4–0 SKC (9/3)
Home colors	Away colors

The 2021 Sporting Kansas City season was the twenty-sixth season of the team's existence in Major League Soccer and the eleventh year played under the Sporting Kansas City moniker. The season began on April 17.

== Summary ==
=== Preseason ===
Sporting KC players reported for a seven day quarantine period involving medical exams and testing on March 1. The team then trained for six weeks beginning on March 8 before the season started on April 17. Sporting KC began a one week voluntary training on March 1 before heading to Arizona on March 7. The team then began preseason training and played 4 preseason matches on March 13, March 20, March 24 and April 3 before returning to Kansas City on April 3.

== Roster ==
Note: Flags indicate national team as defined under FIFA eligibility rules; some limited exceptions apply. Players may hold more than one non-FIFA nationality. Squad correct as of October 29, 2021.

No.	Pos.	Nation	Player
1	GK	USA	John Pulskamp
2	DF	USA	Jaylin Lindsey (HGP)
3	DF	ESP	Andreu Fontas
4	DF	CRO	Roberto Punčec
5	DF	FRA	Nicolas Isimat-Mirin
6	MF	ESP	Ilie Sánchez
7	FW	SCO	Johnny Russell (DP)
8	DF	USA	Graham Zusi
9	FW	MEX	Alan Pulido (DP)
11	FW	USA	Khiry Shelton
13	DF	USA	Amadou Dia
15	MF	HON	Roger Espinoza
16	DF	USA	Graham Smith
17	MF	ISR	Gadi Kinda
19	MF	USA	Grayson Barber (HGP)
20	FW	HUN	Dániel Sallói (HGP)
21	MF	COL	Felipe Hernandez (HGP)
22	GK	USA	Kendall McIntosh
23	FW	USA	Tyler Freeman (HGP)
25	FW	USA	Ozzie Cisneros (HGP)
28	DF	USA	Cameron Duke (HGP)
29	GK	USA	Tim Melia
31	GK	USA	Brooks Thompson (HGP)
32	MF	ITA	Jose Mauri
36	DF	POR	Luís Martins
54	MF	FRA	Remi Walter
96	FW	USA	Wilson Harris (HGP)

== Player movement ==
=== In ===
Per Major League Soccer and club policies terms of the deals do not get disclosed.

Date	Player	Position	Previous club	Fee/notes	Ref
October 21, 2020	(United States) Wilson Harris	FW	(United States) Sporting Kansas City II	Homegrown Signing	
December 17, 2020	(United States) Kendall McIntosh	GK	(United States) New York Red Bulls	2020 MLS Re-Entry Process Signing	
December 22, 2020	(France) Remi Walter	MF	(Turkey) Yeni Malatyaspor	International Signing	
January 20, 2021	(United States) Grayson Barber	MF	Sporting Kansas City Academy	Homegrown Academy Signing	
January 20, 2021	(United States) Ozzie Cisneros	FW	Sporting Kansas City Academy	Homegrown Academy Signing	
January 20, 2021	(United States) Brooks Thompson	GK	Sporting Kansas City Academy	Homegrown Academy Signing	
February 3, 2021	(France) Nicolas Isimat-Mirin	DF	(Turkey) Beşiktaş J.K.	International Signing	

==== Draft picks ====
Draft picks are not automatically signed to the team roster. Only trades involving draft picks and executed after the start of 2020 MLS SuperDraft will be listed in the notes.

Round	Pick Number	Player	Position	School
2	23	(United States) Matt Constant	DF	University of North Carolina
3	23	(England) Jamil Roberts	FW	Marshall University

=== Out ===
Date	Player	Position	Destination club	Notes	Ref

== Competitions ==
=== Preseason ===
Kickoff times are in CDT (UTC-05) unless shown otherwise

Preseason schedule announced on March 1, 2021.

March 13, 2021	Sporting Kansas City	4–0	Phoenix Rising FC	Chandler, Arizona
12:00 pm CST	Harris 9', 19'. 33'; Busio 29'	Report		Stadium: Wild Horse Pass Stadium

March 20, 2021	Sporting Kansas City	0–1	Colorado Rapids	Tucson, Arizona
5:00 pm CDT		Report	Moor 75'	Stadium: Kino Sports Complex

March 24, 2021	Sporting Kansas City	3–3	Portland Timbers	Tucson, Arizona
1:00 pm CDT	Shelton 44'; Harris 48'; Espinoza 64'	Report	Valeri 52'; Asprilla 66'; Tuiloma 88'	Stadium: Kino Sports Complex

April 3, 2021	Sporting Kansas City	1–0	LA Galaxy	Tucson, Arizona
2:00 pm CDT	Busio 33'	Report		Stadium: Kino Sports Complex

=== MLS ===
==== Standings ====
===== Western Conference =====
Pos	Team	Pld	W	L	T	GF	GA	GD	Pts	Qualification
1	Colorado Rapids	34	17	7	10	51	35	+16	61	MLS Cup Conference Semifinals
2	Seattle Sounders FC	34	17	8	9	53	33	+20	60	MLS Cup First Round
3	Sporting Kansas City	34	17	10	7	58	40	+18	58	MLS Cup First Round
4	Portland Timbers	34	17	13	4	56	52	+4	55	MLS Cup First Round
5	Minnesota United FC	34	13	11	10	42	44	−2	49	MLS Cup First Round

Source: MLS
Rules for classification: 1) points; 2) total wins; 3) total goal differential; 4) total goals scored; 5) fewer disciplinary points; 6) away goal differential; 7) away goals scored; 8) home goals differential; 9) home goals scored; 10) coin toss (2 clubs tied) or drawing of lots (≥3 clubs tied)

===== Overall table =====
Pos	Team	Pld	W	L	T	GF	GA	GD	Pts	Qualification
2	Colorado Rapids	34	17	7	10	51	35	+16	61	CONCACAF Champions League
3	Seattle Sounders FC	34	17	8	9	53	33	+20	60	CONCACAF Champions League
4	Sporting Kansas City	34	17	10	7	58	40	+18	58	
5	Portland Timbers	34	17	13	4	56	52	+4	55	
6	Philadelphia Union	34	14	8	12	48	35	+13	54	

Source: MLS
Rules for classification: 1) points; 2) total wins; 3) total goal differential; 4) total goals scored; 5) fewer disciplinary points; 6) away goal differential; 7) away goals scored; 8) home goals differential; 9) home goals scored; 10) coin toss (2 clubs tied) or drawing of lots (≥3 clubs tied)

===== Results by round =====
Round	1	2	3	4	5	6	7	8	9	10	11	12	13	14	15	16	17	18	19	20	21	22	23	24	25	26	27	28	29	30	31	32	33	34
Stadium	A	H	A	H	A	H	A	H	H	A	H	H	A	H	A	H	A	A	A	H	A	H	A	H	H	H	A	H	A	A	H	A	A	H
Result	W	D	L	W	L	W	W	W	D	L	W	W	W	D	W	L	W	D	W	D	D	D	L	W	W	L	W	W	L	W	W	L	L	L

A = Away; H = Home; W = Win; D = Draw; L = Loss

==== Match Results ====
April 17, 2021 1	New York Red Bulls	1–2	Sporting Kansas City	Harrison, New Jersey
7:00 pm CDT	Diarra (yellow card) 41'; Clark 48'	Report	Isimat-Mirin (yellow card) 9'; Kinda 59' (pen.); Sallói 60'	Stadium: Red Bull Arena; Referee: Robert Sibiga

April 23, 2021 2	Sporting Kansas City	1–1	Orlando City SC	Kansas City, Kansas
6:30 pm CDT	Busio 45'; Punčec (yellow card) 86'	Report	Smith (yellow card) 12'; Méndez (yellow card) 61'; Nani 79'	Stadium: Children's Mercy Park; Attendance: 20,086; Referee: Joe Dickerson

May 1, 2021 3	Real Salt Lake	3–1	Sporting Kansas City	Sandy, Utah
1:00 pm CDT	Ruiz (yellow card) 32'; Kreilach 35'; Rubin 52', 77'; Chang (yellow card) 77'	Report	Pulido 17'	Stadium: Rio Tinto Stadium; Referee: David Gantar

May 9, 2021 4	Sporting Kansas City	2–1	Austin FC	Kansas City, Kansas
6:30 pm CDT	Sánchez (yellow card) 56'; Martins (yellow card) 59'; Sánchez 82'; Kinda 90'	Report	Gallagher 7'; Romaña (yellow card) 42'; Ring (yellow card) 45' (yellow card) (red card) 67'; Pereira (yellow card) 87'	Stadium: Children's Mercy Park; Referee: Joe Dickerson

May 12, 2021 5	Houston Dynamo FC	1–0	Sporting Kansas City	Houston, Texas
7:30 pm CDT	Urruti 56'; Picault (yellow card) 90 +6'	Report	Espinoza (yellow card) 70'	Stadium: BBVA Stadium

May 16, 2021 6	Sporting Kansas City	3–0	Vancouver Whitecaps FC	Kansas City, Kansas
1:00 pm CDT	Sánchez (yellow card) 9'; Sallói 28'; Pulido 32', 58'; Kinda (yellow card) 36'; Espinoza (yellow card) 72'	Report	Cornelius (yellow card) 55'	Stadium: Children's Mercy Park; Referee: Alan Kelly

May 22, 2021 7	San Jose Earthquakes	1–3	Sporting Kansas City	San Jose, California
1:00 pm CDT	López 4'; Espinoza (yellow card) 9'; Ríos (yellow card) 49'	Report	Lindsey 15', (yellow card) 90'; Pulido 60'; Sallói 75'	Stadium: PayPal Park; Referee: Allen Chapman

May 29, 2021 8	Sporting Kansas City	3–2	Houston Dynamo FC	Kansas City, Kansas
7:30 pm CDT	Busio 51'; Pulido 61'; Kinda 65'; Zusi (yellow card) 90+1'	Report	Jones (yellow card) 4'; Vera 13', (yellow card) 42'; García (yellow card) 82'; Urruti 90+3'	Stadium: Children's Mercy Park; Attendance: 20,086; Referee: Drew Fischer

June 12, 2021 9	Sporting Kansas City	1–1	Austin FC	Kansas City, Kansas
2:30 pm CDT	Walter (yellow card) 32'; Salloi 71'	Report	Dominguez 26'; Besler (yellow card) 79'; Lima (yellow card) 90'	Stadium: Children's Mercy Park; Attendance: 18,519; Referee: Robert Sibiga

June 19, 2021 10	Portland Timbers	2–1	Sporting Kansas City	Portland, Oregon
9:30 pm CDT	Asprilla 36'; Župarić (yellow card) 38'; Loría 45+1'; Zambrano (yellow card) 87'	Report	Lindsey 28'; Fontàs (yellow card) 69'; Espinoza (yellow card) 74'; Ilie (yellow card) 83'	Stadium: Providence Park; Referee: Alan Kelly

June 23, 2021 11	Sporting Kansas City	3–1	Colorado Rapids	Kansas City, Kansas
7:30 pm CDT	Sallói 14', 38'; Hernández 64'	Report	Rosenberry 84'	Stadium: Children's Mercy Park; Attendance: 18,690; Referee: David Gantar

June 26, 2021 12	Sporting Kansas City	2–1	Los Angeles FC	Kansas City, Kansas
4:00 pm CDT	Ilie (yellow card) 44'; Pulido 61'; Sallói 87'	Report	Blackmon (yellow card) 12' (yellow-red card) 58'; Moon-hwan 24'; Romero (yellow card) 64'	Stadium: Children's Mercy Park; Attendance: 20,213; Referee: Chris Penso

July 4, 2021 13	LA Galaxy	0–2	Sporting Kansas City	Carson, California
9:30 pm CDT	Villafaña (yellow card) 45+3'	Report	Sallói (yellow card) 32'; Russell 81'; Shelton 90+5'	Stadium: Dignity Health Sports Park; Attendance: 23,556; Referee: Alex Chilowicz

July 21, 2021 14	Sporting Kansas City	1–1	San Jose Earthquakes	Kansas City, Kansas
7:30 pm CDT	Lindsey (yellow card) 57'; Zusi (yellow card) 86'; Sallói 90 +4'	Report	López (yellow card) 40'; Tavares (yellow card) 49' (yellow-red card) 90 +5'; Espinoza (yellow card) 81'; Cardoso 53' (yellow card) 86'	Stadium: Children's Mercy Park; Attendance: 17,872; Referee: Joseph Dickerson

July 25, 2021 15	Seattle Sounders FC	1–3	Sporting Kansas City	Seattle, Washington
8:00 pm CDT	Leyva (yellow card) 29'; Montero 51'; Paulo (yellow card) 84'	Report	Russell 31'; Sallói 42'; Duke 72'; Zusi (yellow card) 80'	Stadium: Lumen Field; Attendance: 32,790; Referee: Ramy Touchan

July 31, 2021 16	Sporting Kansas City	1–2	FC Dallas	Kansas City, Kansas
7:30 pm CDT	Sallói (yellow card) 68'; Russell 85'	Report	Pomykal 3'; Ferreira 51'; Twumasi (yellow card) 73'; Bressan (yellow card) 80'; Jara (yellow card) 84'; Hedges (yellow card) 90+1'	Stadium: Children's Mercy Park; Attendance: 19,975; Referee: Alex Chilowicz

August 4, 2021 17	Los Angeles FC	1–4	Sporting Kansas City	Los Angeles, California
9:30 pm CDT	Romero (yellow card) 20'; Cifuentes (yellow card) 33'; Ginella (yellow card) 62'; Musovski 82'; Duke (yellow card) 85'; Atuesta (yellow card) 90+7'	Report	Pulido 20'; Isimat-Mirin (yellow card) 25'; Martins 28'; Sallói 36'; Zusi (yellow card) 41'; Sánchez (yellow card) 57'; Kinda 58'; Fontàs (yellow card) 90+2'; Espinoza (yellow card) 90+6'	Stadium: Banc of California Stadium; Attendance: 22,114; Referee: Alan Kelly

August 7, 2021 18	Colorado Rapids	0–0	Sporting Kansas City	Commerce City, Colorado
8:00 pm CDT	Warner (yellow card) 28'; Beitashour (yellow card) 63'	Report	Punčec (yellow card) 10'; Lindsey (yellow card) 81'	Stadium: Dick's Sporting Goods Park; Attendance: 11,753; Referee: Ted Unkel

August 14, 2021 19	FC Dallas	0–2	Sporting Kansas City	Frisco, Texas
7:30 pm CDT	Ferreira (yellow card) 38'; Hedges (yellow card) 49'; Obrian (yellow card) 67'; Schön (yellow card) 68'; Vargas (yellow card) 76'; Twumasi (yellow card) 89'	Report	Pulido 12'; Sallói 63'; Kinda (yellow card) 90+1'	Stadium: Toyota Stadium; Attendance: 14,133; Referee: Armando Villarreal

August 18, 2021 20	Sporting Kansas City	1–1	Portland Timbers	Kansas City, Kansas
7:30 pm CDT	Sallói (yellow card) 25', (goal) 90+1'; Pulido (yellow card) 62'	Report	Mora 17'; Chará (yellow card) 28'; Van Rankin (yellow card) 43'; Bonilla (yellow card) 77'; Valeri (yellow card) 84'	Stadium: Children's Mercy Park; Attendance: 17,081; Referee: Ismail Elfath

August 21, 2021 21	Minnesota United FC	0–0	Sporting Kansas City	Saint Paul, Minnesota
2:30 pm CDT	Dibassy (yellow card) 6'; Métanire (yellow card) 59'	Report	Walter (red card) 21'; Russell (yellow card) 25'; Zusi (yellow card) 69'; Sallói (yellow card) 86'; Espinoza (yellow card) 90+1'	Stadium: Allianz Field; Referee: Marcos de Oliveira

August 28, 2021 22	Sporting Kansas City	1–1	Colorado Rapids	Kansas City, Kansas
7:30 pm CDT	Russell 41'	Report	Lewis 16', (yellow card) 30'; Abubakar (yellow card) 24'; Trusty (yellow card) 69'; Rosenberry (yellow card) 72'	Stadium: Children's Mercy Park; Attendance: 19,883; Referee: Fotis Bazakos

September 3, 2021 22	Los Angeles FC	4–0	Sporting Kansas City	Los Angeles
7:00 PM PT	Fall 18', 61'; Ibeagha (yellow card) 41'; Arango 71'; Duke (yellow card) 77'; Musovski (yellow card) 79'; Atuesta 87' (pen.)	Report	Espinoza (red card) 58'; Melia (yellow card) 85'	Stadium: Banc of California Stadium; Attendance: 22,018; Referee: Drew Fischer

September 11, 2021 24	Sporting Kansas City	2–0	Chicago Fire FC	Kansas City, Kansas
7:30 pm CDT	José Mauri 4'; Russel 6'	Report	Stojanović (yellow card) 32'; F. Navarro (yellow card) 53'; M. Navarro (yellow card) 68'	Stadium: Children's Mercy Park; Attendance: 18,467; Referee: Jon Freemon

September 15, 2021 25	Sporting Kansas City	4–0	Minnesota United FC	Kansas City, Kansas
7:30 pm CDT	Shelton 14'; Sallói 36'; Russell 45' (pen.); Duke 52'	Report	Fragapane (yellow card) 50'	Stadium: Children's Mercy Park; Attendance: 16,888; Referee: Robert Sibiga

September 26, 2021 26	Sporting Kansas City	1–2	Seattle Sounders FC	Kansas City, Kansas
5:00 pm CDT	Russell 60'; Zusi (yellow card) 90+4'	Report	Tolo (yellow card) 16'; C. Roldan 31'; Gómez (yellow card) 53'; Bruin 55'; A. Roldan (yellow card) 86'	Stadium: Children's Mercy Park; Attendance: 19,248; Referee: Joseph Dickerson

September 29, 2021 27	FC Dallas	1–3	Sporting Kansas City	Frisco, Texas
7:30 pm CDT	Acosta (red card) 52'; Pepi 68'; Munjoma (yellow card) 81'	Report	Sallói 13', 61'; Russell 55' (pen.); Barber (yellow card) 90+5'	Stadium: Toyota Stadium; Attendance: 12,387; Referee: Jair Marrufo

October 3, 2021 28	Sporting Kansas City	4–2	Houston Dynamo FC	Kansas City, Kansas
3:00 pm CDT	Russell 16' (pen.), 90'; Sallói 26'; Kinda 57'; Zusi (yellow card) 85'	Report	Junqua (yellow card) 16'; Hadebe (yellow card) 27'; Picault 50'; Vera (yellow card) 53'; Quintero 76'	Stadium: Children's Mercy Park; Attendance: 17,867; Referee: Alex Chilowicz

October 17, 2021 29	Vancouver Whitecaps FC	2–1	Sporting Kansas City	Vancouver, BC
9:00 pm CDT	Gauld 23'; Teibert 36'; White (yellow card) 51'; Nerwinski (yellow card) 85'	Report	Russell 43'; Sánchez (yellow card) 45+1'; Walter (yellow card) 70'; Kinda (yellow card) 70'	Stadium: BC Place; Attendance: 10,990; Referee: Silviu Petrescu

October 23, 2021 30	Seattle Sounders FC	1–2	Sporting Kansas City	Seattle, Washington
8:00 pm CDT	João Paulo (yellow card) 35'; Rowe (yellow card) 51'; A. Roldan (yellow card) 55'; Benezet 58'; Gómez (yellow card) 76'; Montero (yellow card) 89'	Report	Walter 4'; Melia (yellow card) 56'; Kinda (yellow card) 63'; Espinoza (yellow card) 74'; Russell 79'	Stadium: Lumen Field; Attendance: 32,139; Referee: Ismail Elfath

October 27, 2021 31	Sporting Kansas City	2–0	LA Galaxy	Kansas City, Kansas
7:30 pm CDT	Russell 40', 82'; Isimat-Mirin (yellow card) 90+2'	Report		Stadium: Children's Mercy Park; Attendance: 18,711; Referee: Alan Kelly

October 31, 2021 32	Minnesota United FC	2–1	Sporting Kansas City	Saint Paul, Minnesota
12:00 PM CDT	Fragapane 20' (pen.), (yellow card) 84'; Reynoso 39'; Alonso (yellow card) 73'	Report	Shelton 8'; Duke (yellow card) 48'; Kinda (yellow card) 79'; Dia (yellow card) 86'	Stadium: Allianz Field; Referee: Victor Rivas

November 3, 2021 33	Austin FC	3–1	Sporting Kansas City	Austin, Texas
8:00 pm CDT	Driussi 1'; Cascante 22'; Gallagher (yellow card) 50'; Stroud 60'	Report	Isimat-Mirin (yellow card) 21'; Russell 65'	Stadium: Q2 Stadium; Attendance: 20,738; Referee: Nima Saghafi

November 7, 2021 34	Sporting Kansas City	0–1	Real Salt Lake	Kansas City, Kansas
5:00 pm CST	Espinoza (yellow card) 78'	Report	Luiz (yellow card) 86'; Herrera (yellow card) 90+3'; Kreilach 90+5'	Stadium: Children's Mercy Park; Attendance: 19,022; Referee: Ted Unkel

=== MLS Cup Playoffs ===
November 20 First round	Sporting Kansas City	3–1	Vancouver Whitecaps FC	Kansas City, Kansas
4:00 PM CST	Shelton 17'; Isimat-Mirin 45+3'; Zusi 58'	Report	Dájome 39' (pen.); Gaspar (yellow card) 86'; Cavallini (yellow card) 89'; Godoy (yellow card) 90+2'	Stadium: Children's Mercy Park; Attendance: 19,817; Referee: Alan Kelly

November 28 Western Conference Semifinals	Sporting Kansas City	1–2	Real Salt Lake	Kansas City, Kansas
2:00 PM CST	Russell 24' (pen.)	Report	Luiz (yellow card) 49'; Julio 72'; Wood 90+1'	Stadium: Children's Mercy Park; Attendance: 21,650; Referee: Kevin Stott

=== Leagues Cup ===
August 10, 2021 Quarterfinals	Sporting Kansas City (United States)	1–6	(Mexico) León	Kansas City, Kansas
7:00 p.m. CDT	Duke 61'	Report	Colombatto 16'; Fernández 27', 44'; Mena 62'; Meneses 72'; Dávila 79'	Stadium: Children's Mercy Park; Attendance: 15,579; Referee: Juan Gabriel Calderón (Costa Rica)

== Player statistics ==
=== Squad appearances and goals ===
Last updated on September 23, 2020.

No.	Pos	Nat	Player	Total		Major League Soccer		US Open Cup		Playoffs	
No.	Pos	Nat	Player	Apps	Goals	Apps	Goals	Apps	Goals	Apps	Goals
Goalkeepers
22	GK	(United States) USA	Kendall McIntosh	0	0	0	0	0	0	0	0
24	GK	(United States) USA	John Pulskamp	0	0	0	0	0	0	0	0
29	GK	(United States) USA	Tim Melia	0	0	0	0	0	0	0	0
31	GK	(United States) USA	Brooks Thompson	0	0	0	0	0	0	0	0
Defenders
3	DF	(Spain) ESP	Andreu Fontas	0	0	0	0	0	0	0	0
4	DF	(Croatia) CRO	Roberto Punčec	0	0	0	0	0	0	0	0
5	DF	(France) FRA	Nicolas Isimat-Mirin	0	0	0	0	0	0	0	0
8	DF	(United States) USA	Graham Zusi	0	0	0	0	0	0	0	0
13	DF	(United States) USA	Amadou Dia	0	0	0	0	0	0	0	0
16	DF	(United States) USA	Graham Smith	0	0	0	0	0	0	0	0
26	DF	(United States) USA	Jaylin Lindsey	0	0	0	0	0	0	0	0
36	DF	(Portugal) POR	Luís Martins	0	0	0	0	0	0	0	0
Midfielders
6	MF	(Spain) ESP	Ilie	0	0	0	0	0	0	0	0
10	MF	(United States) USA	Gianluca Busio	0	0	0	0	0	0	0	0
15	MF	(Honduras) HON	Roger Espinoza	0	0	0	0	0	0	0	0
17	MF	(Israel) ISR	Gadi Kinda	0	0	0	0	0	0	0	0
19	MF	(United States) USA	Grayson Barber	0	0	0	0	0	0	0	0
21	MF	(Colombia) COL	Felipe Hernandez	0	0	0	0	0	0	0	0
28	MF	(United States) USA	Cameron Duke	0	0	0	0	0	0	0	0
54	MF	(France) FRA	Remi Walter	0	0	0	0	0	0	0	0
Forwards
7	FW	(Scotland) SCO	Johnny Russell	0	0	0	0	0	0	0	0
9	FW	(Mexico) MEX	Alan Pulido	0	0	0	0	0	0	0	0
11	FW	(United States) USA	Khiry Shelton	0	0	0	0	0	0	0	0
20	FW	(Hungary) HUN	Dániel Sallói	0	0	0	0	0	0	0	0
23	FW	(United States) USA	Tyler Freeman	0	0	0	0	0	0	0	0
25	FW	(United States) USA	Ozzie Cisneros	0	0	0	0	0	0	0	0
96	FW	(United States) USA	Wilson Harris	0	0	0	0	0	0	0	0
Players who have made an appearance or had a squad number this season but have left the club

0+1 means player did came on as a sub once. 1+1 means player started once and came on as a sub once.
