= 2018 Sporting Kansas City season =

Sporting Kansas City
2018 season
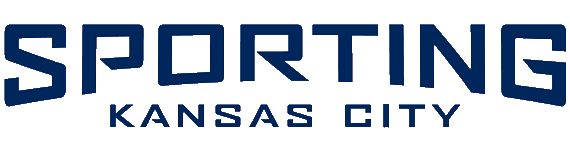
- Owner: Sporting Club
- Head Coach: Peter Vermes
- Stadium: Children's Mercy Park
- MLS: Conference: 1st Overall: 3rd
- Playoffs: Conference Finals
- U.S. Open Cup: Quarterfinals
- Top goalscorer: League: Johnny Russell (10); All: Dániel Sallói (13)
- Highest home attendance: 20,831 March 4 vs NYCFC
- Lowest home attendance: 15,238 June 16 vs FC Dallas
- Average home league attendance: League: 19,774; All: 19,270
Home colors	Away colors

The 2018 Sporting Kansas City season was the twenty-third season of the team's existence in Major League Soccer and the eighth year played under the Sporting Kansas City moniker.

== Current roster ==
As of October 10, 2018

Note: Flags indicate national team as defined under FIFA eligibility rules; some limited exceptions apply. Players may hold more than one non-FIFA nationality.

No.	Pos.	Nation	Player
1	GK	USA	Adrián Zendejas
2	DF	CAN	Amer Didic
3	DF	USA	Ike Opara
4	DF	USA	Brad Evans
5	DF	USA	Matt Besler (Captain)
6	MF	ESP	Ilie Sánchez
7	FW	SCO	Johnny Russell
8	DF	USA	Graham Zusi
9	FW	HUN	Krisztián Németh
10	MF	FRA	Yohan Croizet (DP)
11	FW	CHI	Diego Rubio
12	FW	GBS	Gerso Fernandes
13	FW	USA	Gianluca Busio (HGP)
14	FW	USA	Khiry Shelton

No.	Pos.	Nation	Player
15	DF	USA	Seth Sinovic
16	DF	USA	Graham Smith
17	MF	HON	Roger Espinoza (DP)
18	GK	USA	Eric Dick
19	MF	ESP	Cristian Lobato
20	FW	HUN	Dániel Sallói (HGP)
21	MF	CHI	Felipe Gutiérrez (DP)
23	DF	USA	Colton Storm
26	DF	USA	Jaylin Lindsey (HGP)
28	FW	USA	Tyler Freeman (HGP)
29	GK	USA	Tim Melia
30	DF	ESP	Andreu Fontas
75	MF	USA	Wan Kuzain
90	FW	USA	Kharlton Belmar
94	MF	COL	Jimmy Medranda

== Player movement ==
=== In ===
Per Major League Soccer and club policies terms of the deals do not get disclosed.

Date	Player	Position	Previous club	Fee/notes	Ref
December 14, 2017	(United States) Khiry Shelton	FW	(United States) New York City FC	Traded for Saad Abdul-Salaam	
December 15, 2017	(France) Yohan Croizet	MF	(Belgium) KV Mechelen	Transfer	
January 17, 2018	(United States) Zach Wright	FW	(United States) University of North Carolina	Homegrown Player	
January 22, 2018	(United States) Matt Lewis	DF	(United States) Fordham University	Homegrown Player	
January 31, 2018	(Scotland) Johnny Russell	FW	(England) Derby County	Transfer	
February 6, 2018	(Chile) Felipe Gutiérrez	MF	(Spain) Real Betis	Transfer	
February 15, 2018	(United States) Eric Dick	GK	(United States) Butler University	2018 MLS SuperDraft	
February 15, 2018	(United States) Graham Smith	DF	(United States) Denver University	2018 MLS SuperDraft	
February 20, 2018	(United States) Brad Evans	DF	(United States) Seattle Sounders FC	Free agent	
April 13, 2018	(United States) Wan Kuzain	MF	(United States) Saint Louis FC	Homegrown Player	
August 6, 2018	(Hungary) Krisztián Németh	FW	(United States) New England Revolution	Trade with New England Revolution	
August 8, 2018	(Spain) Andreu Fontàs	CB	(Spain) RC Celta de Vigo	Trade with RC Celta de Vigo	
October 2, 2018	(United States) Tyler Freeman	FW		Homegrown Player (Will be added to roster ahead of 2019 season)	

==== Draft picks ====
Draft picks are not automatically signed to the team roster. Only trades involving draft picks and executed after the start of 2018 MLS SuperDraft will be listed in the notes.

Round	Pick Number	Player	Position	School
1	13	(United States) Eric Dick	GK	Butler
1	18	(United States) Graham Smith	DF	Denver
4	75	(United States) Will Bagrou	FW	Bercer
4	82	(Liberia) Wilfred Williams	DF	Oakland

=== Out ===
Date	Player	Position	Destination club	Notes	Ref
November 27, 2017	(United States) Cameron Porter	FW	Retired	Out of contract	
November 27, 2017	(United States) Erik Palmer-Brown	DF	(England) Manchester City	Out of contract	
November 27, 2017	(United States) Cameron Iwasa	FW	(United States) Sacramento Republic	Option declined, later signed with Sacramento Republic	
November 27, 2017	(Haiti) Soni Mustivar	MF	(Azerbaijan) Neftçi PFK	Option declined, later signed with Neftçi PFK	
November 27, 2017	(Cape Verde) Kevin Oliveira	MF	(Canada) Ottawa Fury	Option declined, later signed with Ottawa Fury	
November 27, 2017	(Canada) Tyler Pasher	MF	(United States) Indy Eleven	Option declined, later signed with Indy Eleven	
December 12, 2017	(Ghana) Latif Blessing	FW	(United States) Los Angeles FC	Selected in 2017 MLS Expansion Draft	
December 14, 2017	(United States) Saad Abdul-Salaam	DF	(United States) New York City FC	Traded for Khiry Shelton	
January 3, 2018	(United States) Benny Feilhaber	MF	(United States) Los Angeles FC	Traded	
February 8, 2018	(United States) Andrew Dykstra	GK	(United States) Colorado Rapids	Traded	
February 8, 2018	(Lebanon) Soony Saad	FW	(United States) Indy Eleven	Waived, later signed with Indy Eleven	
February 27, 2018	(United States) Kevin Ellis	DF	(United States) Chicago Fire	Signed with Chicago Fire on March 9	
February 27, 2018	(United States) Zach Wright	DF	(United States) Rio Grande Valley FC Toros	Waived	
March 1, 2018	(New Zealand) James Musa	MF	(United States) Phoenix Rising	Waived	
June 25, 2018	(United States) Matt Lewis	DF	(United States) Swope Park Rangers	Waived	

=== Loans ===
Per Major League Soccer and club policies terms of the deals do not get disclosed.

==== In ====
Date	Player	Position	Loaned from	Notes	Ref
January 18, 2018	(Argentina) Emiliano Amor	DF	Vélez Sarsfield	one year loan, option to buy at the end of the year	

==== Out ====
Date	Player	Position	Loaned from	Notes	Ref
August 8, 2018	(Argentina) Emiliano Amor	DF	Vélez Sarsfield	Mutually agreed to part ways with Sporting KC	

== Competitions ==
Win Tie Loss

=== Preseason ===
Kickoff times are in CST (UTC-06) unless shown otherwise

January 27, 2018	Phoenix Rising FC trialists	1–2	Sporting Kansas City	Scottsdale, Arizona
12:00	Player X 87'	Report	Sallói 23'; Busio 37'	Stadium: Phoenix Rising FC Soccer Complex
Note: Three 30-minute periods

January 31, 2018	Sporting Arizona FC	0–4	Sporting Kansas City	Scottsdale, Arizona
12:00		Report	Lobato 17'; Gerso 45'; Barry 84'; Bagrou 90'	Stadium: Phoenix Rising FC Soccer Complex
Note: Three 30-minute periods

February 3, 2018	Colorado Rapids	0–2	Sporting Kansas City	Scottsdale, Arizona
11:30		Report	Shelton 12'; Gerso 22'	Stadium: Phoenix Rising FC Soccer Complex
Note: Two 45-minute halves and an extra 30-minute period

==== Mobile Mini Sun Cup ====
Kickoff times are in CST (UTC-06) unless shown otherwise

February 14, 2018	New York Red Bulls	1–1	Sporting Kansas City	Tucson, Arizona
18:20	Wright Phillips 15'	Report	Hernandez 77'	Stadium: Kino Sports Complex

February 17, 2018	Phoenix Rising FC	1–2	Sporting Kansas City	Phoenix, Arizona
16:00	Frater 5'	Report	Ilie 18'; Sallói 30'	Stadium: Phoenix Rising FC Soccer Complex; Attendance: 5,060

February 21, 2018	New England Revolution	2–1	Sporting Kansas City	Tucson, Arizona
12:00	Dick 13' (o.g.); Rowe 36'	Report	Rubio 21'	Stadium: Kino Sports Complex

February 24, 2018	Portland Timbers	3–2	Sporting Kansas City	Tucson, Arizona
	Armenteros 54', 59'; Paredes 76'	Report	Espinoza 27'; Rubio 52'	Stadium: Kino Sports Complex

=== Regular season ===
Kickoff times are in CDT (UTC-05) unless shown otherwise

March 4, 2018 1	Sporting Kansas City	0 – 2	New York City FC	Kansas City, Kansas
18:30 CST		Report	Medina (yellow card) 23'; Moralez; Ring (yellow card) 34'; Johnson (yellow card) 59'; Chanot (red card) 88'	Stadium: Children's Mercy Park; Attendance: 20,831; Referee: Mark Geiger

March 10, 2018 2	Chicago Fire	3 – 4	Sporting Kansas City	Bridgeview, Illinois
17:00 CST	Kappelhof (yellow card) 36'; Schweinsteiger (yellow card) 50'; Katai 70' (Schweinsteiger); Nikolić	Report	Gutiérrez; Melia (yellow card) 33'; Russell; Sánchez (yellow card) 56'; Medranda 83'	Stadium: Toyota Park; Attendance: 14,021; Referee: Jose Carlos Rivero

March 17, 2018 3	Sporting Kansas City	3 – 2	San Jose Earthquakes	Kansas City, Kansas
19:30	Sallói (yellow card) 21'; Sánchez 25' (pen.); Zusi 56'; Gutiérrez 68'	Report	Vako 34'; Quintana (yellow card) 39'; Wondolowski 90+1'	Stadium: Children's Mercy Park; Attendance: 18,868; Referee: Allen Chapman

March 24, 2018 4	Colorado Rapids	2 – 2	Sporting Kansas City	Commerce City, Colorado
20:00	Badji 5' (Castillo); Mason; Price (yellow card) 15'; Jackson (yellow card) 65'; Howard (yellow card) 79'	Report	Gutiérrez 57'; Diego Rubio 90' (Shelton)	Stadium: Dick's Sporting Goods Park; Attendance: 17,424; Referee: Sorin Stoica

March 31, 2018 5	Sporting Kansas City	1 – 0	D. C. United	Kansas City, Kansas
19:30	Gutiérrez 3' (Shelton)	Report		Stadium: Children's Mercy Park; Attendance: 18,624; Referee: Baldomero Toledo

April 8, 2018 6	LA Galaxy	0 – 2	Sporting Kansas City	Carson, California
20:00	Steres (yellow card) 55' dos Santos (yellow card) 77'	Report	Sallói 57'; Russell 61' (Espinoza); Espinoza (yellow card) 82'	Stadium: StubHub Center; Attendance: 25,846; Referee: Robert Sibiga

April 15, 2018 7	Sporting Kansas City	2 – 2	Seattle Sounders FC	Kansas City, Kansas
15:00	Sánchez 34' (pen.); Espinoza (yellow card) 53'; Zusi 78' (Medranda); Medranda (yellow card) 90'	Report	McCrary (yellow card) 24'; Roldan (yellow card) 44' (goal) 73' (Bruin); Bruin 45' (Marshall); Alonso (yellow card) 85'	Stadium: Children's Mercy Park; Attendance: 18,508; Referee: Drew Fischer

April 20, 2018 8	Sporting Kansas City	6 – 0	Vancouver Whitecaps FC	Kansas City, Kansas
20:00	Russell (yellow card) 40'; Medranda 30' (Sallói); Lobato 54' (Croizet); Croizet 77' (Sánchez)	Report	Waston (yellow card) 36'; Reyna (red card) 40'; Juárez (red card) 40'	Stadium: Children's Mercy Park; Attendance: 19,690; Referee: Kevin Stott

April 28, 2018 9	New England Revolution	1 – 0	Sporting Kansas City	Foxborough, Massachusetts
18:30	Bunbury 44'; Fagúndez (yellow card) 45'; Somi (yellow card) 76'	Report	Shelton (yellow card) 76'	Stadium: Gillette Stadium; Attendance: 17,015; Referee: David Gantar

May 5, 2018 10	Sporting Kansas City	1 – 0	Colorado Rapids	Kansas City, Kansas
19:30	Opara (yellow card) 10'; Sallói 16'	Report	McBean (yellow card) 13'; Castillo (yellow card) 52'; Badji (yellow card) 89'	Stadium: Children's Mercy Park; Attendance: 20,553; Referee: Armando Villarreal

May 9, 2018 11	Atlanta United FC	0 – 2	Sporting Kansas City	Atlanta, Georgia
18:30	Larentowicz (yellow card) 31'; Guzan (red card) 34'	Report	Sallói 67' (Ilie); Gerso 87' (Ilie); Besler (yellow card) 89'	Stadium: Mercedes-Benz Stadium; Attendance: 44,696; Referee: Mark Geiger

May 20, 2018 12	Minnesota United FC	1 – 1	Sporting Kansas City	Minneapolis, Minnesota
13:00	Quintero 20'; Schüller (yellow card) 51'; Luiz Fernando (yellow card) 71'		Shelton 8' (Russell) (yellow card) 58'; Sinovic (yellow card) 53'	Stadium: TCF Bank Stadium; Attendance: 23,117; Referee: Jair Marrufo

May 27, 2018 13	Sporting Kansas City	0 – 0	Columbus Crew SC	Kansas City, Kansas
17:00	Besler (yellow card) 90+4'	Report	Higuaín (red card) 45+6'; Afful (yellow card) 49'	Stadium: Children's Mercy Park; Attendance: 20,697; Referee: Robert Sibiga

June 3, 2018 14	Sporting Kansas City	4 – 1	Minnesota United FC	Kansas City, Kansas
19:30	Sallói 9' (Croizet); Kuzain 35'; Lobato 38' (Espinoza); Diego Rubio 81' (Gerso)	Report	Mears 12' (Schüller); Maximiniano (yellow card) 48' (yellow-red card) 63'; Ibarra (yellow card) 77'	Stadium: Children's Mercy Park; Attendance: 20,422; Referee: Drew Fischer

June 9, 2018 15	Portland Timbers	0 – 0	Sporting Kansas City	Portland, Oregon
21:30	Blanco (yellow card) 90+3'	Report	Opara (yellow card) 90+3'	Stadium: Providence Park; Attendance: 21,144; Referee: Chris Penso

June 23, 2018 16	Sporting Kansas City	3 – 2	Houston Dynamo	Kansas City, Kansas
19:30	Espinoza (yellow card) 27'; Sallói 59' (Russell); Diego Rubio 85' (Sallói); Shelton 88' (Sallói)	Report	Manotas 2' (Martínez), 45' (Beasley); Alexander (yellow card) 22' (yellow-red card) 87'; Willis (yellow card) 55'; Fuenmayor (yellow card) 90+2'	Stadium: Children's Mercy Park; Attendance: 20,081; Referee: Alan Kelly

June 30, 2018 17	Montreal Impact	2 – 0	Sporting Kansas City	Montreal, Quebec
18:00	Krolicki (yellow card) 19'; Duvall (yellow card) 46'; Piatti 54'; Silva 70' (pen.)	Report	Croizet (yellow card) 68'; Opara (yellow card) 69'	Stadium: Saputo Stadium; Attendance: 16,142

July 4, 2018 18	Real Salt Lake	4 – 2	Sporting Kansas City	Sandy, Utah
21:00	Savarino 29'; Baird 37'; Saucedo (yellow card) 44' (goal) 45+1' (Kreilach); Kreilach (yellow card) 77'; Silva 90+10' (pen.)	Report	Sallói (yellow card) 43' (yellow-red card) 90'; Amor (yellow card) 59'; Espinoza (yellow card) 60' (yellow-red card) 90+4'; Opara (yellow card) 66'; Gerso (yellow card) 90+3'; Ilie (yellow card) 90+9'	Stadium: Rio Tinto Stadium; Attendance: 19,206; Referee: Sorin Stoica

July 7, 2018 19	Sporting Kansas City	2 – 2	Toronto FC	Kansas City, Kansas
19:30	Sánchez 57' (pen.); Russell 61' (Diego Rubio); Zusi (yellow card) 81'; Kuzain (yellow card) 90+4'	Report	Osorio; Zavaleta (yellow card) 56'; Fraser (yellow card) 59'; Hamilton 69' (Hasler)	Stadium: Children's Mercy Park; Attendance: 21,064; Referee: José Carlos Rivero

July 14, 2018 20	New York Red Bulls	3 – 2	Sporting Kansas City	Harrison, New Jersey
18:00	Wright-Phillips 4' (Kaku); Muyl (yellow card) 31'; Rzatkowski	Report	Russell 8' (Zusi); Croizet (yellow card) 17'; Espinoza 51' (Zusi)	Stadium: Red Bull Arena; Attendance: 16,793; Referee: Kevin Stott

July 28, 2018 21	Sporting Kansas City	2 – 3	FC Dallas	Kansas City, Kansas
19:30	Opara (yellow card) 45+2'; Gerso 50' (Diego Rubio); Espinoza (yellow card) 87'; Sallói 90+7' (Opara)		Gruezo (yellow card) 15'; Barrios 23', 62' (Lamah), 74' (Urruti); Lamah (yellow card) 41'; Pedroso (yellow card) 69'; Urruti (yellow card) 90+9'	Stadium: Children's Mercy Park; Attendance: 20,758; Referee: Drew Fischer

August 4, 2018 22	Houston Dynamo	0 – 1	Sporting Kansas City	Houston, Texas
20:00	Quioto (yellow card) 4'; Fuenmayor (red card) 14'; Elis (yellow card) 15' (yellow-red card) 90+8'; García (yellow card) 19'; Willis (yellow card) 70'; Peña (yellow card) 80'; Cerén (red card) 90+4'; Leonardo (yellow card) 90+10'	Report	Sinovic (yellow card) 22'; Diego Rubio (yellow card) 90+2'	Stadium: BBVA Compass Stadium; Attendance: 14,675; Referee: Chris Penso

August 11, 2018 23	Los Angeles FC	0 – 2	Sporting Kansas City	Los Angeles, California
21:30	Nguyen (yellow card) 36'; Jakovic (yellow card) 63'	Report	Gerso 17' (Diego Rubio); Sánchez 66' (pen.); Espinoza (yellow card) 70'; Zusi (yellow card) 72'	Stadium: Banc of California Stadium; Attendance: 22,000; Referee: Ismail Elfath

August 18, 2018 24	Sporting Kansas City	3 – 0	Portland Timbers	Kansas City, Kansas
19:30	Diego Rubio; Russell 89' (Németh)	Report	Cascante (yellow card) 51'; Valentin (yellow card) 60'	Stadium: Children's Mercy Park; Attendance: 19,737; Referee: Allen Chapman

August 25, 2018 25	Sporting Kansas City	2 – 0	Minnesota United FC	Kansas City, Kansas
19:30	Croizet; Diego Rubio 62' (Russell. Sinovic)	Report	Calvo (yellow card) 50'; Boxall (yellow card) 52'	Stadium: Children's Mercy Park; Attendance: 19,345; Referee: Robert Sibiga

September 1, 2018 26	Seattle Sounders FC	3 – 1	Sporting Kansas City	Seattle, Washington
15:00	Ruidíaz; Kee-hee (yellow card) 27'; Zusi 52' (o.g.); Lodeiro 56' (pen.); Marshall (red card) 81'; Frei (yellow card) 82'	Report	Diego Rubio 2' (Fernandes), (yellow card) 32'; Sánchez (yellow card) 43'; Opara (yellow card) 45+1'	Stadium: CenturyLink Field; Attendance: 39,530; Referee: Baldomero Toledo
Note: Marshall's red card was rescinded by an independent panel

September 8, 2018 27	Sporting Kansas City	1 – 0	Orlando City SC	Kansas City, Kansas
19:30	Gutiérrez 53' (Croizet)	Report	Mueller (yellow card) 38'; Johnson (yellow card) 42'	Stadium: Children's Mercy Park; Attendance: 19,332; Referee: Alan Kelly

September 15, 2018 28	San Jose Earthquakes	1 – 5	Sporting Kansas City	San Jose, California
21:30	Godoy (yellow card) 50'; Eriksson (yellow card) 57'; Hossen 80' (Fernandes)	Report	Gutiérrez 18' (Fernandes); Fernandes 23' (Gutiérrez), 86' (Rubio); Opara 42'; Németh	Stadium: Avaya Stadium; Attendance: 16,682; Referee: Dave Gantar

September 23, 2018 29	Philadelphia Union	2 – 0	Sporting Kansas City	Chester, Pennsylvania
12:00	Simpson 71', 89'; Accam (yellow card) 66'; Mbaizo (yellow card) 75'	Report	Espinoza (yellow card) 65'	Stadium: Talen Energy Stadium; Attendance: 15,080; Referee: Mark Geiger

September 30, 2018 30	Sporting Kansas City	1 – 1	Real Salt Lake	Kansas City, Kansas
16:00	Opara 52'; Gutiérrez (yellow card) 74'	Report	Baird 9'	Stadium: Children's Mercy Park; Attendance: 19,844; Referee: Kevin Stott

October 6, 2018 31	Sporting Kansas City	1 – 1	LA Galaxy	Kansas City, Kansas
19:30	Zlatan 25'; Bingham (yellow card) 89'	Report	Sinovic (yellow card) 34'; Russell (yellow card) 49' (goal) 83'; Sánchez (yellow card) 49'; Sallói (yellow card) 50'; Rubio (yellow card) 90+7'	Stadium: Children's Mercy Park; Attendance: 20,092; Referee: Jair Marrufo

October 17, 2018 32	Vancouver Whitecaps FC	1 – 4	Sporting Kansas City	Vancouver, British Columbia
21:00	Felipe 42'	Boxscore	Sinovic (yellow card) 53'; Croizet 62'; Sallói 82', 90+7'; Busio 90+4'	Stadium: BC Place; Attendance: 18,689; Referee: Armando Villarreal

October 21, 2018 33	FC Dallas	0 – 3	Sporting Kansas City	Frisco, Texas
16:00	González (yellow card) 16'; Pedroso (yellow card) 86'	Report	Sallói 45'; Espinoza (yellow card) 45+2' (goal) 64'; Gutiérrez (yellow card) 68'; Sánchez (yellow card) 73'; Russell 87' (pen.)	Stadium: Toyota Stadium; Attendance: 19,096; Referee: Robert Sibiga

October 28, 2018 34	Sporting Kansas City	2 – 1	Los Angeles FC	Kansas City, Kansas
15:30	Russell (yellow card) 14'; Espinoza 37'; Sinovic (red card) 62'; Gutiérrez (yellow card) 70'; Sallói 72'; Melia (yellow card) 90+1'	Report	Atuesta (yellow card) 8'; Vela 63' (pen.)	Stadium: Children's Mercy Park; Attendance: 20,702; Referee: Allen Chapman

=== MLS Cup Playoffs ===
==== Western Conference Semifinals ====
November 4, 2018 Leg 1	Real Salt Lake	1–1	Sporting Kansas City	Sandy, Utah
9:00pm CDT	Rusnák (yellow card) 26', (goal) 51'; Beckerman (yellow card) 72'	Report	Rubio 60', (yellow card) 76'	Stadium: Rio Tinto Stadium; Attendance: 14,045; Referee: Baldomero Toledo

November 11, 2018 Leg 2	Sporting Kansas City	4–2	Real Salt Lake	Kansas City, Kansas
2:00 PM	Rubio 14' (yellow card) 63'; Sallói 19', 90+7'; Sánchez 67' (pen.); Espinoza (yellow card) 82'	Report	Herrera (yellow card) 49'; Saucedo 60'; Beckerman (yellow card) 64'; Kreilach 72'	Stadium: Children's Mercy Park; Attendance: 19,918; Referee: Jose Carlos Rivero

Sporting Kansas City won 5-3 on aggregate.

==== Conference Finals ====
November 25, 2018 Leg 1	Portland Timbers	0–0	Sporting Kansas City	Portland, Oregon
18:30 CST	Guzmán (yellow card) 36'	Report	Sinovic (yellow card) 45+1'; Besler (yellow card) 66'; Sallói (yellow card) 89'	Stadium: Providence Park; Attendance: 21,144; Referee: Robert Sibiga

November 29, 2018 Leg 2	Sporting Kansas City	2–3 (2–3 agg.)	Portland Timbers	Kansas City, Kansas
20:30 CST	Sallói 20'; Rubio (yellow card) 47'; Fernandes 81'	Report	Valentin (yellow card) 17'; Guzmán (yellow card) 45+5'; Blanco 52'; Valeri 61', 90+9'; Chara (yellow card) 77'; Villafaña (yellow card) 90+6'; Asprilla (yellow card) 90+7'	Stadium: Children's Mercy Park; Attendance: 20,091; Referee: Mark Geiger

Kickoff times are in CST (UTC-06) unless shown otherwise

=== 2018 Lamar Hunt U.S. Open Cup ===
Kickoff times are in CDT (UTC-05) unless shown otherwise

June 6, 2018 Fourth Round	Real Salt Lake	0 – 2	Sporting Kansas City	Sandy, Utah
20:00 MDT	Herrera (yellow card) 28'; Ruíz (yellow card) 47'	Report	Russell 47'; Belmar 74'	Stadium: Rio Tinto Stadium; Attendance: 15,833; Referee: Malik Badawi

June 16, 2018 Round of 16	Sporting Kansas City	3 – 2	FC Dallas	Kansas City, Kansas
20:00	Sallói; Amor (yellow card) 83'; Croizet 89'	Report	Gruezo 18' (Barrios); Lamah (yellow card) 20' (goal) 77'; Barrios (yellow card) 37'; Hayes (yellow card) 72'; Ulloa (yellow card) 74'	Stadium: Children's Mercy Park; Attendance: 15,238; Referee: Ramy Touchan

July 18, 2018 Quarterfinals	Houston Dynamo	4 – 2	Sporting Kansas City	Houston, Texas
19:30	Quioto (yellow card) 26', (goal) 35', 66' (Cerén); O. García (yellow card) 45'; Manotas 69', 88' (Rodríguez); Fuenmayor (yellow card) 79'	Report	Russell 2' (Gerso); Croizet 90+3' (Russell)	Stadium: BBVA Compass Stadium; Attendance: 6,431; Referee: Allen Chapman

== Player statistics ==
=== Top scorers ===
Rank	Position	Number	Name	MLS	MLS Cup	Open Cup	Total
1	FW	20	(Hungary) Dániel Sallói	8	3	2	13
2	FW	7	(Scotland) Johnny Russell	10	0	2	12
3	FW	11	(Chile) Diego Rubio	8	2	0	10
4	MF	21	(Chile) Felipe Gutiérrez	6	0	0	7
5	FW	12	(Guinea) Gerso Fernandes	5	1	0	6
6	MF	6	(Spain) Ilie Sánchez	4	1	0	5
7	MF	10	(France) Yohan Croizet	2	0	2	4
8	DF	3	(United States) Ike Opara	3	0	0	3
9	DF	8	(United States) Graham Zusi	2	0	0	2
9	FW	14	(United States) Khiry Shelton	2	0	0	2
9	MF	19	(Spain) Cristian Lobato	2	0	0	2
9	DF	94	(Colombia) Jimmy Medranda	2	0	0	2
9	MF	17	(Honduras) Roger Espinoza	2	0	0	2
14	MF	75	(United States) Wan Kuzain	1	0	0	1
14	FW	90	(United States) Kharlton Belmar	0	0	1	1
14	FW	9	(Hungary) Krisztián Németh	1	0	0	1
Total				58	7	7	72

As of November 10, 2018

=== Disciplinary record ===
Number	Nation	Position	Name	MLS		U.S. Open Cup		Total	
Number	Nation	Position	Name	Booked	Sent off (straight red)	Booked	Sent off (straight red)	Booked	Sent off (straight red)
3	(United States)	DF	Ike Opara	5	0	0	0	5	0
5	(United States)	DF	Matt Besler	2	0	0	0	2	0
6	(Spain)	MF	Ilie Sánchez	5	0	0	0	5	0
7	(Scotland)	FW	Johnny Russell	2	0	0	0	2	0
8	(United States)	DF	Graham Zusi	2	0	0	0	2	0
10	(France)	MF	Yohan Croizet	2	0	0	0	2	0
11	(Chile)	FW	Diego Rubio	3	0	0	0	3	0
12	(Guinea)	FW	Gerso Fernandes	1	0	0	0	1	0
14	(United States)	FW	Khiry Shelton	2	0	0	0	2	0
15	(United States)	DF	Seth Sinovic	4	0	0	0	4	0
17	(Honduras)	MF	Roger Espinoza	8	1	0	0	8	1
20	(Hungary)	FW	Dániel Sallói	3	1	0	0	3	1
22	(Argentina)	DF	Emiliano Amor	1	0	1	0	2	0
29	(United States)	GK	Tim Melia	1	0	0	0	1	0
75	(United States)	MF	Wan Kuzain	1	0	0	0	1	0
94	(Colombia)	DF	Jimmy Medranda	1	0	0	0	1	0
			TOTALS	43	2	3	0	46	2

As of September 9, 2018
