= Aljaž Džankić =

Croatian footballer

Personal information
- Date of birth: 19 March 2002 (age 24)
- Place of birth: Ptuj, Slovenia
- Height: 1.91 m (6 ft 3 in)
- Position: Defender

Youth career
- –2019: Maribor
- 2019–2020: Udinese

Senior career*
Years	Team	Apps	(Gls)
2020–2021	Aluminij	2	(0)
2021–2023	Sporting Kansas City II	19	(0)

International career
2017	Croatia U15		
2018–2019	Croatia U17		
2019	Croatia U18		
2020	Croatia U19	2	(0)
- * Club domestic league appearances and goals

Aljaž Džankić (born 19 March 2002) is a Croatian professional footballer.

== Career ==
In 2019, Džankić joined the youth academy of Italian Serie A side Udinese from the youth academy of Maribor, Slovenia's most successful club.

In 2020, he signed for Aluminij in the Slovenian top flight.

On 4 March 2021, Džankić joined USL Championship side Sporting Kansas City II.
