= Ozzie Cisneros =

American soccer player

Personal information
- Full name: Osvaldo Cisneros
- Date of birth: March 13, 2004 (age 22)
- Place of birth: Omaha, Nebraska, United States
- Height: 5 ft 5 in (1.65 m)
- Positions: Attacking midfielder; winger

Youth career
- Los Guerreritos
- Omaha Nitro
- 2016–2021: Sporting Kansas City

Senior career*
| Years | Team | Apps | (Gls) |
| 2021–2024 | Sporting Kansas City | 0 | (0) |
| 2021–2024 | Sporting Kansas City II | 52 | (6) |
| 2024 | → Carolina Core FC (loan) | 4 | (0) |

International career^{‡}
| 2019 | United States U15 | 10 | (4) |
- * Club domestic league appearances and goals as of October 31, 2024 ‡ National team caps and goals as of August 10, 2019

Osvaldo "Ozzie" Cisneros (born March 13, 2004) is an American professional soccer player who plays as an attacking midfielder.

== Club career ==
Born in Omaha, Nebraska, Cisneros began playing soccer with his family as a toddler and attending games at Omaha's Latino League, where his father played, at age five. After playing for a local club which disbanded, Cisneros began playing with Los Guerreritos, a club founded by his father which played in the South Omaha league. He then joined Leones Negros, soon renamed Omaha Nitro, playing in various tournaments around Nebraska.

=== Sporting Kansas City ===
In 2016, Cisneros began playing in the youth academy of Sporting Kansas City, rising up the ranks before signing a professional homegrown player deal with the first team on January 20, 2021. On May 1, 2021, Cisneros made his professional debut for Sporting Kansas City II, the club's reserve side in the USL Championship, against FC Tulsa, starting in the 0–2 defeat. Cisneros played for the first team in a Leagues Cup game against Liga MX club León.

Cisneros was released by Kansas City following their 2024 season.

== International career ==
Born in the United States to Mexican parents, Cisneros holds a U.S. and Mexican citizenship, which makes him eligible to represent either the United States or Mexico. Cisneros represented the United States at the under-15 level.

== Career statistics ==
=== Club ===
As of match played May 6, 2023

Appearances and goals by club, season and competition
| Club | Season | League | | | National cup | | Continental | | Other | | Total | |
| Club | Season | Division | Apps | Goals | Apps | Goals | Apps | Goals | Apps | Goals | Apps | Goals |
|---|---|---|---|---|---|---|---|---|---|---|---|---|
| Sporting Kansas City | 2021 | MLS | — | | — | | 1 (Note: Appearance in Leagues Cup) | 0 | — | | 1 | 0 |
| Sporting Kansas City | 2022 | MLS | — | | 1 | 0 | — | | — | | 1 | 0 |
| Sporting Kansas City | Total | | 0 | 0 | 1 | 0 | 1 | 0 | 0 | 0 | 2 | 0 |
| Sporting Kansas City II | 2021 | USL | 21 | 3 | — | | — | | — | | 21 | 3 |
| Sporting Kansas City II | 2022 | MLS Next Pro | 4 | 0 | — | | — | | — | | 4 | 0 |
| Sporting Kansas City II | 2023 | MLS Next Pro | 6 | 1 | — | | — | | — | | 6 | 1 |
| Sporting Kansas City II | Total | | 31 | 4 | — | | — | | — | | 31 | 4 |
| Career total | | | 31 | 4 | 1 | 0 | 1 | 0 | 0 | 0 | 33 | 4 |
