= Coby Jones =

American soccer player

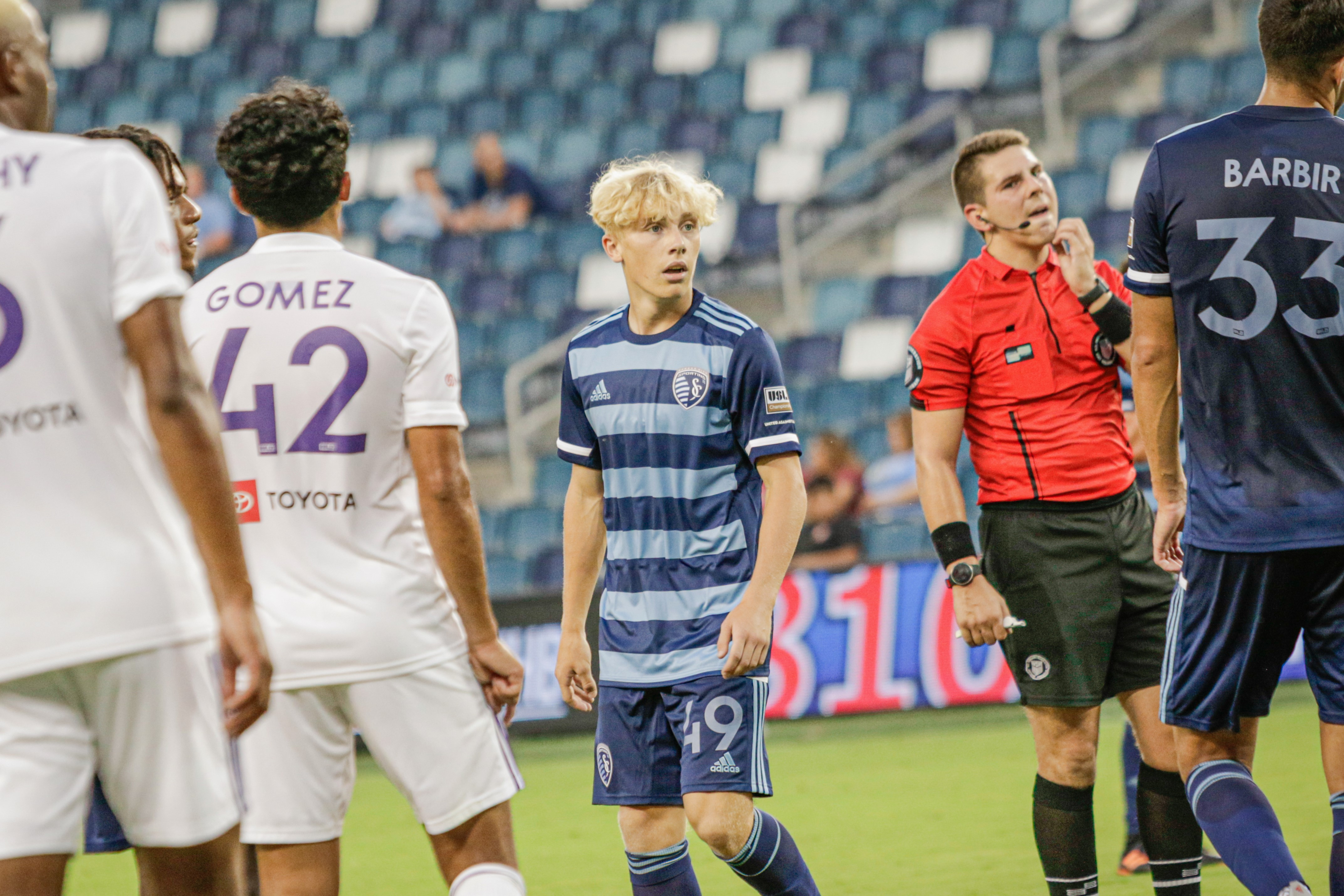
- Sporting Kansas City player Coby Jones in a match against Louisville City FC

Personal information
- Full name: Coby Michael Jones
- Date of birth: August 15, 2003 (age 23)
- Place of birth: Topeka, Kansas, United States
- Height: 5 ft 8 in (1.72 m)
- Positions: Left back; left winger

Team information
- Current team: Sporting Kansas City II
- Number: 49

Youth career
- 2011–2016: Toca FC
- 2016–2022: Sporting Kansas City II

Senior career*
Years	Team	Apps	(Gls)
2021–2023	Sporting Kansas City II	38	(1)
- * Club domestic league appearances and goals as of September 23, 2022

Coby Michael Jones (born August 15, 2003) is an American professional soccer player who plays as a defender for Sporting Kansas City.

== Club career ==
Born in Topeka, Kansas but raised in Olathe, Jones joined the Sporting Kansas City academy in early 2016. He helped the SKC Academy U-13s win the 2017 Kansas State Cup, assisting the game-winning goal in the final. On June 22, 2021, it was announced Jones had signed an academy contract to play with Sporting's USL Championship side Sporting Kansas City II. He made his debut on June 23, 2021, appearing as an 84th-minute substitute during a 1–0 loss to OKC Energy. He scored his first goal on July 2, 2021, vs. Louisville City FC. Sporting Kansas City II signed Jones for its first season in MLS NEXT Pro in March 2022.

== Career statistics ==
As of match played July 4, 2021

Appearances and goals by club, season and competition
Club	Season	League			National Cup		Continental		Total	
Club	Season	Division	Apps	Goals	Apps	Goals	Apps	Goals	Apps	Goals
Sporting Kansas City II	2021	USL Championship	9	1	—		—		9	1
Career total			25	1	0	0	0	0	25	1
