= Johnny Russell (footballer) =

Scottish footballer (born 1990)

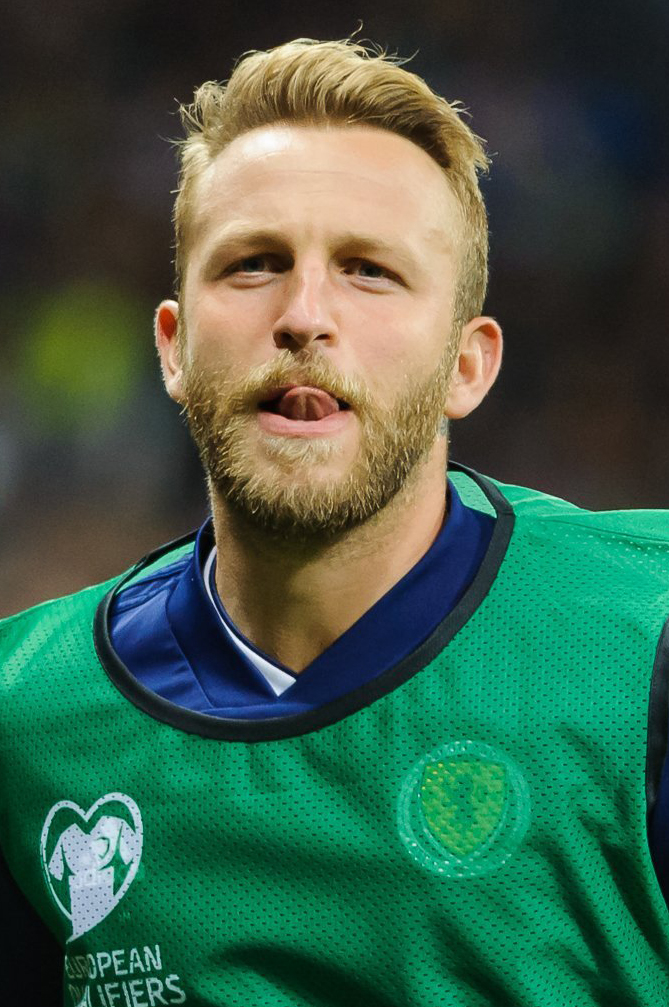
- Russell with Scotland in 2019

Personal information
- Full name: Johnathon Simpson Snedden Russell
- Date of birth: 8 April 1990 (age 36)
- Place of birth: Glasgow, Scotland
- Height: 1.78 m (5 ft 10 in)
- Position: Winger

Youth career
- 2003–2007: Dundee United

Senior career*
| Years | Team | Apps | (Gls) |
| 2007–2013 | Dundee United | 102 | (31) |
| 2008 | → Forfar Athletic (loan) | 9 | (4) |
| 2009 | → Forfar Athletic (loan) | 17 | (4) |
| 2009–2010 | → Raith Rovers (loan) | 23 | (4) |
| 2013–2018 | Derby County | 182 | (30) |
| 2018–2024 | Sporting Kansas City | 198 | (60) |
| 2025 | Real Salt Lake | 12 | (2) |
| 2026 | Dundee United | 7 | (0) |

International career^{‡}
| 2007–2009 | Scotland U19 | 10 | (2) |
| 2010–2012 | Scotland U21 | 11 | (1) |
| 2014–2019 | Scotland | 14 | (1) |
- * Club domestic league appearances and goals as of 20 May 2026 ‡ National team caps and goals as of 14 October 2019

Johnathon Simpson Snedden Russell (born 8 April 1990) is a Scottish professional footballer who last played as a winger for Scottish Premiership club Dundee United. He has previously played for Forfar Athletic, Raith Rovers, Derby County, Sporting Kansas City, and Real Salt Lake. Russell represented Scotland at under-19 and under-21 level. He was first named in the Scotland squad in 2012, and made his full international debut in November 2014. Russell is the highest-scoring Scottish-born player in MLS history.

== Early life ==
He was born Johnathon Simpson Snedden Russell in Glasgow, Scotland. He was interested in football during his childhood. Born to a split family in Glasgow, he chose to support Celtic FC, and continued attending many Celtic games throughout his professional career.

== Club career ==
=== Dundee United ===
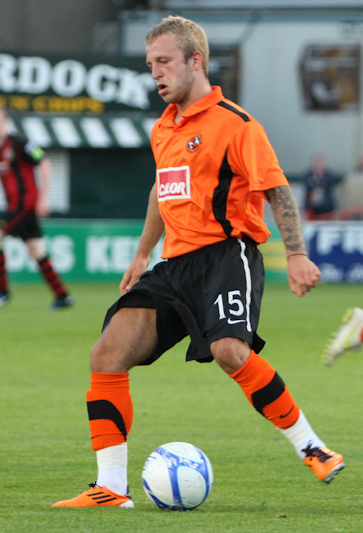
Russell playing for Dundee United in 2011

Russell, who had featured just five times for Dundee United's under-19 side in 2006–07, made his professional debut in the Scottish Premier League on 12 May 2007 in the 2–0 defeat at Falkirk, coming on as an 80th-minute substitute for Steven Robb.

In August 2008, Russell moved on loan to Forfar Athletic of the Scottish Football League Third Division until the end of the year, scoring twice on his début. In January 2009, Russell made his first start for Dundee United in the Scottish Cup fourth round victory at East Stirlingshire, scoring a second-half penalty kick for his first United goal. Russell returned to Forfar on loan for the remainder of the season, agreeing a contract extension with United in April until May 2012.

In September 2009, Russell played and scored in Dundee United's League Cup win against Ross County before undertaking a month's loan with Raith Rovers in the Scottish Football League First Division, which was subsequently extended until Boxing Day. The deal was further extended until the end of the season, and Russell ended his time in Kirkcaldy with his first senior hat-trick in a final day 4–1 win over Ross County.

In April 2011, Russell scored a header for Dundee United's second goal in a 3–2 win at Ibrox, in which David Goodwillie scored the winner in the 89th minute. On 21 July he scored for United in the 2011–12 UEFA Europa League, the second in a 3–2 second qualifying round second leg win against Polish side Śląsk Wrocław. United had lost the first leg 1–0, so were eliminated on the away goals rule. He also scored against Celtic that season, and established himself in the United team.

On 7 January 2012, Russell netted a hat-trick, the second of his career, in a 6–2 Scottish Cup win over Airdrie United. As of that match, Russell had scored a total of 9 goals in the 2011–12 season and it saw him become a regular in the starting line-up alongside Jon Daly.

On 19 January 2013, Russell scored his first SPL hattrick in a 3–2 win over Kilmarnock. Russell equalled Finn Døssing's record for the fastest ever Dundee United goal when he scored after 14 seconds in a 3–0 Scottish Cup victory against Rangers at Tannadice Park on 2 February.

In May 2013, it was reported that bids for Russell were made by Italian Serie A team Catania and English Championship side Derby County with Dundee United keen to sell Russell with a year left on his contract after his agent stated that Russell would not be signing a new contract. In June 2013; Derby County had an offer accepted for the striker.

=== Derby County ===
Russell joined Derby County on 10 June 2013 for a fee of around £750,000, and he signed a four-year contract. He scored twice on his debut in a pre-season friendly at Irish side Bohemians. Russell's competition for a starting place consisted of Chris Martin, Conor Sammon and Jamie Ward. Russell scored on his competitive debut from the penalty spot in Derby's 1–1 draw with Blackburn Rovers on 4 August. He scored a fifth in four friendlies in the Bass Charity Vase final against Burton Albion on 13 August, which Derby lost 3–2. Russell fractured his left fibula during the game and was ruled out of action for six weeks.

In 2017 Mo Johnston suggested Russell move to Sporting Kansas City, and Russell joined them for the 2018 season.

=== Sporting Kansas City ===
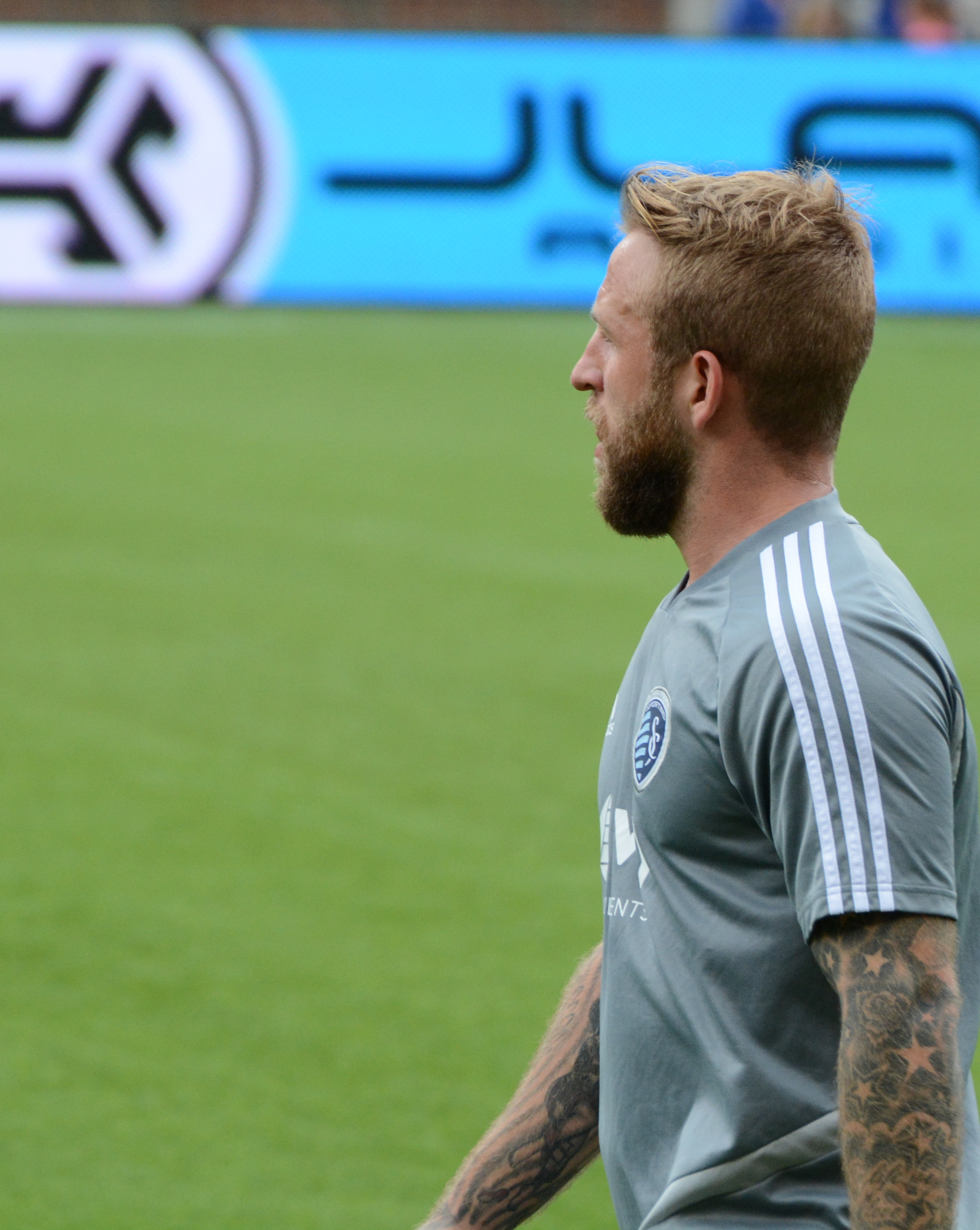
Johnny Russell warming up.

On 31 January 2018, Russell signed with Major League Soccer club Sporting Kansas City on a three-year contract. He made his debut for Sporting in the opening game of their 2018 MLS season, a 2–0 defeat against New York City FC on 4 March. Russell's solo goal against Los Angeles Galaxy earned him MLS Goal of the Week. Russell scored a hat-trick for Sporting KC in a 6–0 win against Vancouver Whitecaps FC on 20 April, earning him the MLS Player of the week award.

On May 26, 2019, Russell became the first player for Sporting KC to score 2 Hat-tricks which was against Seattle Sounders FC over a 3–2 win.

In March 2021, Russell was named captain after Matt Besler departed the club. On October 28, 2021, Russell was awarded MLS Player of the Week for Week 33 of the 2021 season in recognition of his brace in a 2–0 win over the Los Angeles Galaxy. Russell finished the 2021 regular season with 15 goals, placing him as the highest-scoring Scottish-born player in MLS history.

In that same year he earned Sporting KC Offensive Player of the Year. He won it for being the most Scottish male to score the most goals. At the MLS Cup Playoffs he scored a goal to help his team win 3–1 against Vancouver Whitecaps FC. In the first round of the Western Conference he scored a penalty to help Sporting win over Real Salt Lake, but unfortunately, Sporting lost in the semifinals to Salt Lake.

He extended his contract with Sporting Kansas City to stay until 2024.

In 2022 he was named Co-Humanitarian of the year and started in 31 games that season with eight goals and one assist.

Russell was injured at the start of the season after a Hamstring injury and missed the first games. In a match against Portland Timbers in 2023 he was injured at the end of the game. Where Peter Vermes said that he will be out 3–4 weeks.

On matchday 34 of the 2023 Major League Soccer season Russell was fined for failing to leave the field in a timely manner after he was sent off in the 37th minute in a match against Houston Dynamo FC.

At matchday 38, MLS announced that he was soccer player of matchday for helping Sporting Kansas City score two goals against Minnesota United FC. He became third top goal scorer for Kansas City.

Russell left Kansas City following their 2024 season.

=== Real Salt Lake ===
On 25 April 2025, Russell signed a contract with MLS side Real Salt Lake until the end of their 2025 season.

=== Return to Dundee United ===
On 3 March 2026, Russell signed a short-term contract with Scottish Premiership side Dundee United until the end of the season.

== International career ==
In August 2007, Russell made his debut for the Scotland under-19s. He scored two goals in 10 appearances for the under-19s. Russell then played 11 times for the Scotland under-21s, scoring once in the process. He received his first call up to the full national team for the match against the United States in May 2012, but did not play. Russell made his full international debut in November 2014, in a 3–1 friendly home defeat to England. On as a second-half substitute, Russell provided the assist for Andrew Robertson to make it 2–1.

Uncapped since October 2015, he was recalled to the Scotland squad in May 2018, for friendlies against Peru and Mexico. On 24 March 2019 he scored his first international goal to secure a 2–0 away win over San Marino in UEFA Euro 2020 qualifying. Russell was unable to play for Scotland during 2020 as COVID-19 protocols made it impractical for him to travel between North America and Europe for international matches.

== Personal life ==
He is married to Nadine Russell (née Dean), and they have three children.

He has been a Celtic FC fan since his early years. He is also a supporter of his brother's local soccer team with them wanting to participate in the Special Olympics but they were postponed due to COVID-19.

While living in the United States, he has developed an affinity for Muscle Cars.

== Career statistics ==
=== Club ===
As of 23 October 2025

Appearances and goals by club, season and competition
| Club | Season | League | | | National Cup | | League Cup | | Continental | | Other | | Total | |
| Club | Season | Division | Apps | Goals | Apps | Goals | Apps | Goals | Apps | Goals | Apps | Goals | Apps | Goals |
|---|---|---|---|---|---|---|---|---|---|---|---|---|---|---|
| Dundee United | 2006–07 | Scottish Premier League | 2 | 0 | 0 | 0 | 0 | 0 | – | | – | | 2 | 0 |
| Dundee United | 2007–08 | Scottish Premier League | 2 | 0 | 0 | 0 | 0 | 0 | – | | – | | 2 | 0 |
| Dundee United | 2008–09 | Scottish Premier League | 0 | 0 | 1 | 1 | 0 | 0 | – | | – | | 1 | 1 |
| Dundee United | 2009–10 | Scottish Premier League | 0 | 0 | 0 | 0 | 1 | 1 | – | | – | | 1 | 1 |
| Dundee United | 2010–11 | Scottish Premier League | 29 | 9 | 3 | 0 | 1 | 0 | 0 | 0 | – | | 33 | 9 |
| Dundee United | 2011–12 | Scottish Premier League | 37 | 9 | 3 | 4 | 1 | 1 | 2 (Note: Appearances in UEFA Europa League) | 1 | – | | 43 | 15 |
| Dundee United | 2012–13 | Scottish Premier League | 32 | 13 | 2 | 5 | 2 | 2 | 2 | 0 | – | | 38 | 20 |
| Dundee United | Total | | 102 | 31 | 9 | 10 | 5 | 4 | 4 | 1 | – | | 120 | 46 |
| Forfar Athletic (loan) | 2008–09 | Scottish Third Division | 9 | 4 | 0 | 0 | 0 | 0 | – | | 0 | 0 | 9 | 4 |
| Forfar Athletic (loan) | 2008–09 | Scottish Third Division | 17 | 4 | 0 | 0 | 0 | 0 | – | | 0 | 0 | 17 | 4 |
| Raith Rovers (loan) | 2009–10 | Scottish First Division | 23 | 4 | 5 | 1 | 0 | 0 | – | | 0 | 0 | 28 | 5 |
| Derby County | 2013–14 | Championship | 39 | 9 | 0 | 0 | 1 | 0 | – | | 3 (Note: Appearances in Championship play-offs) | 0 | 43 | 9 |
| Derby County | 2014–15 | Championship | 39 | 6 | 2 | 0 | 5 | 2 | – | | – | | 46 | 8 |
| Derby County | 2015–16 | Championship | 45 | 9 | 2 | 0 | 1 | 0 | – | | 2 | 1 | 50 | 10 |
| Derby County | 2016–17 | Championship | 21 | 1 | 1 | 0 | 1 | 0 | – | | – | | 23 | 1 |
| Derby County | Total | | 144 | 25 | 5 | 0 | 8 | 2 | – | | 5 | 1 | 162 | 28 |
| Sporting Kansas City | 2018 | Major League Soccer | 30 | 10 | 3 | 2 | 4 (Note: Appearances in MLS Cup Playoffs) | 0 | – | | 5 | 0 | 42 | 12 |
| Sporting Kansas City | 2019 | Major League Soccer | 28 | 9 | 0 | 0 | 0 | 0 | 4 (Note: Appearances in CONCACAF Champions League) | 0 | 1 | 0 | 33 | 9 |
| Sporting Kansas City | 2020 | Major League Soccer | 25 | 6 | – | | 0 | 0 | – | | – | | 25 | 6 |
| Sporting Kansas City | 2021 | Major League Soccer | 30 | 15 | – | | 2 | 1 | – | | – | | 32 | 16 |
| Sporting Kansas City | 2022 | Major League Soccer | 33 | 8 | 4 | 2 | – | | – | | – | | 37 | 10 |
| Sporting Kansas City | 2023 | Major League Soccer | 28 | 4 | – | | – | | – | | 3 | 1 | 31 | 9 |
| Sporting Kansas City | 2024 | Major League Soccer | 29 | 8 | – | | – | | – | | 0 | 0 | 28 | 4 |
| Sporting Kansas City | Total | | 113 | 40 | 3 | 2 | 6 | 1 | 4 | 0 | 6 | 0 | 132 | 43 |
| Real Salt Lake | 2025 | Major League Soccer | 13 | 4 | – | | – | | – | | 0 | 0 | 13 | 4 |
| Career total | | | 408 | 108 | 22 | 13 | 19 | 7 | 8 | 1 | 11 | 1 | 468 | 130 |

=== International ===
As of 19 October 2019

Appearances and goals by national team and year
| National team | Year | Apps | Goals |
|---|---|---|---|
| Scotland | 2014 | 1 | 0 |
| Scotland | 2015 | 3 | 0 |
| Scotland | 2018 | 5 | 0 |
| Scotland | 2019 | 5 | 1 |
| Total | | 14 | 1 |

As of 19 October 2019
Scores and results list Scotland's goal tally first, score column indicates score after each Russell goal

List of international goals scored by Johnny Russell
| No. | Date | Venue | Opponent | Score | Result | Competition |
|---|---|---|---|---|---|---|
| 1 | 24 March 2019 | San Marino Stadium, Serravalle, San Marino | San Marino | 2–0 | 2–0 | UEFA Euro 2020 qualifying |

== Honours ==
Sporting Kansas City

- Western Conference (regular season): 2018, 2020
- Sporting KC MVP: 2020, 2022
- Sporting KC Offensive Player of the Year: 2018, 2019, 2021

Sporting positions
| Preceded by Matt Besler | Sporting Kansas City captain 2021–2024 | Succeeded by Erik Thommy |
