= Michael Lenis =

American soccer player

Personal information
- Full name: Michael Lenis
- Date of birth: October 12, 2003 (age 23)
- Place of birth: Weston, Florida, United States
- Height: 5 ft 6 in (1.68 m)
- Position: Defender

Team information
- Current team: Kansas City Comets
- Number: 29

Youth career
- 2016–2017: Weston FC
- 2017–2022: Sporting Kansas City

Senior career*
Years	Team	Apps	(Gls)
2021–2023	Sporting Kansas City II	27	(1)
2023–	Kansas City Comets (indoor)	22	(11)
- * Club domestic league appearances and goals as of November 27, 2024

Michael Lenis (born October 12, 2003) is an American professional soccer player who plays as a defender for Major Arena Soccer League club Kansas City Comets.

== Early life ==
Lenis was born in Weston, Florida. He moved to his mother's home town, Kansas City in early 2017.

== Club career ==
Lenis began his career with local U.S. Soccer Development Academy club Weston FC. In 2017, Lenis moved to Kansas City, his mother's hometown, and joined the youth setup at Sporting Kansas City. He progressed through the ranks of the academy, representing the club at the under-17 and under-19 levels. On April 30, 2021, it was announced that Lenis, alongside seven other academy players, had signed a United Soccer League academy contract which would allow him to play with Sporting Kansas City II while retaining NCAA eligibility.

Lenis made his senior debut in the USL Championship for Sporting Kansas City II on May 7, 2021, against OKC Energy. He came on as a 68th-minute substitute as Sporting Kansas City II drew the match 1–1.

In November 2023, Lenis signed with the Kansas City Comets of the Major Arena Soccer League.

== International career ==
Lenis has been called up by the United States for the under-14 and under-16 levels. He was first selected for the under-14s in February 2017. Lenis was then selected to be part of the U.S. Soccer boy's national team Futures Camp in May 2017. A year later, in June 2018, Lenis was called into the under-16 squad for their training camp in Bradenton, Florida.

== Career statistics ==
As of match played May 7, 2021

Appearances and goals by club, season and competition
Club	Season	League			National Cup		Continental		Total	
Club	Season	Division	Apps	Goals	Apps	Goals	Apps	Goals	Apps	Goals
Sporting Kansas City II	2021	USL Championship	1	0	—		—		1	0
Career total			1	0	0	0	0	0	1	0
