= Kaveh Rad =

American soccer player

Personal information
- Full name: Kaveh Rad
- Date of birth: June 13, 2001 (age 25)
- Place of birth: Chapel Hill, North Carolina, United States
- Height: 1.85 m (6 ft 1 in)
- Positions: Center back; defensive midfielder

Youth career
- –2016: North Carolina FC Youth
- 2016–2020: Sporting Kansas City

Senior career*
Years	Team	Apps	(Gls)
2018–2022	Sporting Kansas City II	57	(1)
2021–2022	Sporting Kansas City	5	(0)
2023	Hartford Athletic	17	(1)
2024	Portland Timbers 2	27	(0)
- * Club domestic league appearances and goals as of November 18, 2024

Kaveh Rad (Persian: کاوه راد; born June 13, 2001) is an American professional soccer player who plays as a center back and defensive midfielder.

== Early career ==
Kaveh Rad was born and raised in North Carolina and played youth soccer for the Capital Area RailHawks Academy. He joined the Sporting Kansas City Academy with his brother Jahon Rad in 2016, scoring seven goals in 65 league appearances in the U.S. Soccer Development Academy from 2016 to 2019 while representing Sporting at the under-15 through under-19 levels.

== Club career ==
=== Sporting Kansas City II ===
Rad played with USL Championship side Swope Park Rangers from their 2018 season via Sporting Kansas City's academy.

On January 24, 2020, Rad signed a fully professional contract with the newly named Sporting Kansas City II. Rad scored his first career professional goal on June 2, 2021, in a USL Championship match against FC Tulsa, receiving USL Championship Man of the Match honors for his performance. He was subsequently named in the USL Championship Team of the Week for his performance against Tulsa.

=== Sporting Kansas City ===
On April 8, 2021, Rad signed a homegrown player contract with Kansas City's first team. He made his MLS debut on May 1, 2021, during the 2021 season against Real Salt Lake at the age of 19. Rad notably received an honorable mention in just his second career MLS start, completing 92.3% of his 52 passes in a 3–1 win against the San Jose Earthquakes on May 22, 2021. He made his Leagues Cup debut in a quarterfinal match against Liga MX side Club León on August 10, 2021, at Children's Mercy Park. Rad made his U.S. Open Cup debut for the club during the 2022 season on May 10, 2022, against FC Dallas. Following the 2022 season, his contract option was declined by Kansas City.

=== Hartford Athletic ===
Rad joined Hartford Athletic of the USL Championship ahead of the 2023 season and scored a goal in his debut game on March 11, 2023, against Monterey Bay FC.

=== Portland Timbers 2 ===
Rad signed with Portland Timbers 2 in MLS Next Pro on March 14, 2024. His contract with Portland expired following the 2024 season.

== Style of play ==
Rad has been praised for his defensive abilities, including his clearances, pass completion, and duel winning.

== Personal life ==
Rad is of Iranian descent. Rad's twin brother, Jahon, also played soccer for the Sporting Kansas City academy, and his brother Cyrus is also a professional soccer player.

== Career statistics ==
As of 3 July 2019

Club	Division	Season	League		National cup		Other		Total	
Club	Division	Season	Apps	Goals	Apps	Goals	Apps	Goals	Apps	Goals
Swope Park Rangers	USL Championship	2018	0	0	—		0	0	0	0
Swope Park Rangers	USL Championship	2019	7	0	—		—		7	0
Career total			7	0	—		0	0	7	0
