= Cameron Duke =

American soccer player (born 2001)

Personal information
- Date of birth: February 13, 2001 (age 25)
- Place of birth: Overland Park, Kansas, United States
- Height: 5 ft 7 in (1.70 m)
- Position: Midfielder

Team information
- Current team: Louisville City FC
- Number: 28

Youth career
- 2012–2019: Sporting Kansas City

Senior career*
Years	Team	Apps	(Gls)
2019–2024	Sporting Kansas City	50	(2)
2021–2024	Sporting Kansas City II	7	(2)
2024	Crown Legacy	26	(1)
2025	Louisville City	0	(0)
2025	Hartford Athletic	1	(0)
2026–	Louisville City	3	(0)

International career
2016	United States U16	4	(0)
2018	United States U18	2	(0)
- * Club domestic league appearances and goals as of October 31, 2026

Cameron Duke (born February 13, 2001) is an American professional soccer player who plays as a midfielder for USL Championship club Louisville City FC.

== Club career ==
Born in Overland Park, Kansas, Duke joined the youth academy at Sporting Kansas City in 2012. He is the younger brother of former Sporting Kansas City, Swope Park Rangers, and Kansas City Comets midfielder Christian Duke, who would later join the SKC academy as a coach. He proceeded to rise up through the club ranks before signing a professional homegrown player deal with the Sporting Kansas City first team on July 18, 2019. Prior to signing with the club, Duke had committed to playing college soccer with the Duke Blue Devils but decided to turn professional instead.

On July 30, 2020, Duke made his professional debut for Sporting Kansas City during the MLS is Back Tournament against the Philadelphia Union. He came on as an 84th-minute substitute as Sporting Kansas City were defeated 3–1.

Duke signed a 25-day contract with Hartford Athletic on September 4, 2025.

== International career ==
Duke earned his first call-up to the United States under-14 side in 2013. On February 9, 2018, Duke made his debut for the under-18s against Costa Rica, starting in a 2–1 victory.

== Career statistics ==
=== Club ===
As of match played August 27, 2022

Appearances and goals by club, season and competition
Club	Season	League			National cup		Continental		Other		Total	
Club	Season	Division	Apps	Goals	Apps	Goals	Apps	Goals	Apps	Goals	Apps	Goals
Sporting Kansas City	2020	MLS	8	0	—		—		—		8	0
Sporting Kansas City	2021	MLS	16	2	—		1	1	—		17	3
Sporting Kansas City	2022	MLS	24	0	3	0	0	0	—		27	0
Sporting Kansas City	Total		48	2	3	0	1	1	0	0	52	3
Sporting Kansas City II	2021	USL	4	1	—		—		—		4	1
Career total			52	3	3	0	1	1	0	0	56	4
