= Matt Constant =

Canadian soccer player

Personal information
- Full name: Matthew Constant
- Date of birth: August 17, 1998 (age 28)
- Place of birth: Irving, Texas, United States
- Height: 6 ft 6 in (1.98 m)
- Position: Defender

Youth career
- 2009–2016: Dallas Texans

College career
Years	Team	Apps	(Gls)
2016–2017	New Mexico Lobos	38	(1)
2019–2020	North Carolina Tar Heels	18	(1)

Senior career*
Years	Team	Apps	(Gls)
2018	Texas United	10	(1)
2019	Wake FC	2	(0)
2021	Sporting Kansas City II	10	(0)
2022	Michigan Stars FC	21	(1)

International career^{‡}
2015	United States U17		
2016–2017	Canada U20		
- * Club domestic league appearances and goals as of November 5, 2021 ‡ National team caps and goals as of May 1, 2021

Matthew Constant (born August 17, 1998) is a former soccer player.

== Career ==
=== Youth ===
Constant spent 7 years as part of the Dallas Texans USSDA academy side.

=== College & amateur ===
Constant played college soccer at the University of New Mexico for two seasons in 2016 and 2017. He made 38 appearances, scoring one goal for the Lobos. In 2019, Constant transferred to the University of North Carolina at Chapel Hill, where he played two further seasons, including a truncated 2020 season due to the COVID-19 pandemic. For the Tar Heels, Constant made 18 appearances. He scored a single goal and tallied a single assist.

Whilst at college, Constant also played in the USL League Two, appearing for Texas United in 2018 and Wake FC in 2019.

=== Professional ===
On January 21, 2021, Constant was selected 50th overall in the 2021 MLS SuperDraft by Sporting Kansas City. He signed with the club's USL Championship side Sporting Kansas City II on April 28, 2021. Following the 2021 season, Kansas City opted to declined their contract option on Constant.

== International ==
Constant has represented the United States at under-17 level and Canada at under-20 level in 2016 and 2017.

== Personal ==
Both of Constant's parents are from Manitoba, Canada.
