= Grayson Barber =

American soccer player (born 2000)

Personal information
- Full name: Grayson Barber
- Date of birth: May 3, 2000 (age 26)
- Place of birth: Columbia, South Carolina, United States
- Height: 5 ft 9 in (1.75 m)
- Position: Midfielder

Youth career
- 2015–2018: Sporting Kansas City

College career
Years	Team	Apps	(Gls)
2018–2020	Clemson Tigers	49	(13)

Senior career*
Years	Team	Apps	(Gls)
2018–2019	SC United Bantams	13	(2)
2021–2022	Sporting Kansas City	9	(-81)
2021	Sporting Kansas City II	10	(1)
2022	Charlotte Independence	21	(0)
- * Club domestic league appearances and goals as of October 16, 2022

Grayson Barber (born May 3, 2000) is an American professional soccer player who plays as a midfielder.

== Club career ==
Born and raised in Columbia, South Carolina, Barber began his career in the youth academy of Sporting Kansas City in 2015. In 2018, he began attending Clemson University and played college soccer with the Clemson Tigers.

Whilst at college, Barber also appeared for USL League Two side SC United Bantams in both 2018 and 2019.

On January 20, 2021, Barber returned to Sporting Kansas City and signed a homegrown player deal with the club. On May 1, 2021, Barber made his professional debut for Sporting Kansas City II, the club's reserve side in the USL Championship, against FC Tulsa, starting in the 0–2 defeat.

On February 14, 2022, Barber was waived by Kansas City.

Barber joined USL League One side Charlotte Independence on May 14, 2022.

== Career statistics ==
As of match played November 25, 2021

Appearances and goals by club, season and competition
Club	Season	League			Cup		Continental		Total	
Club	Season	Division	Apps	Goals	Apps	Goals	Apps	Goals	Apps	Goals
Sporting Kansas City	2021	Major League Soccer	9	0	0	0	0	0	9	0
Sporting Kansas City II	2021	USL Championship	2	0	—		—		2	0
Career total			11	0	0	0	0	0	11	0
