= 2017 Sporting Kansas City season =

Sporting Kansas City
2017 season
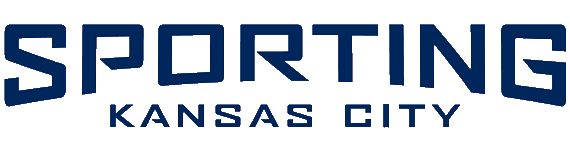
- Owner: Sporting Club
- Head Coach: Peter Vermes
- Stadium: Children's Mercy Park
- MLS: Conference: 5th Overall: 11th
- Playoffs: Knockout Round
- U.S. Open Cup: Champions
- Top goalscorer: League: Gerso (8 goals); All: Gerso (10 goals)
- Highest home attendance: 21,523 (Open Cup Final vs New York Red Bulls)
- Lowest home attendance: 15,016 (Open Cup Quarterfinals vs FC Dallas)
- Average home league attendance: League: 19,565; All: 19,051
Home colors	Away colors	Third colors

The 2017 Sporting Kansas City season was the twenty-second season of the team's existence in Major League Soccer and the seventh year played under the Sporting Kansas City moniker.

== Current roster ==
Note: Flags indicate national team as defined under FIFA eligibility rules; some limited exceptions apply. Players may hold more than one non-FIFA nationality. Squad correct as of September 12, 2017.

No.	Pos.	Nation	Player
1	GK	USA	Adrián Zendejas
2	DF	USA	Erik Palmer-Brown (HGP)
3	DF	USA	Ike Opara
4	DF	USA	Kevin Ellis (HGP)
5	DF	USA	Matt Besler (Captain)
6	MF	ESP	Ilie Sánchez
7	FW	GNB	Gerso Fernandes (DP)
8	DF	USA	Graham Zusi (DP)
9	FW	GHA	Latif Blessing
10	MF	USA	Benny Feilhaber
11	FW	CHI	Diego Rubio
15	DF	USA	Seth Sinovic
17	DF	USA	Saad Abdul-Salaam
19	MF	ESP	Cristian Lobato
20	FW	USA	Gianluca Busio (HGP)
21	GK	USA	Andrew Dykstra
22	FW	LBN	Soony Saad
23	DF	USA	Colton Storm
24	FW	USA	Cameron Iwasa
27	MF	HON	Roger Espinoza (DP)
29	GK	USA	Tim Melia
30	FW	HUN	Dániel Sallói (HGP)
39	FW	USA	Cameron Porter
41	DF	NZL	James Musa
55	DF	CAN	Amer Didic
77	MF	CAN	Tyler Pasher
88	MF	CPV	Kevin Oliveira
90	FW	USA	Kharlton Belmar
93	MF	HAI	Soni Mustivar
94	MF	COL	Jimmy Medranda

== Player movement ==
=== In ===
Per Major League Soccer and club policies terms of the deals do not get disclosed.

Date	Player	Position	Previous club	Fee/notes	Ref
December 12, 2016	(Canada) Tyler Pasher	MF	(United States) Swope Park Rangers	Signed from USL team	
December 2, 2016	(United States) Adrian Zendejas	GK	(United States) Swope Park Rangers	Signed from USL team	
January 4, 2017	(Guinea-Bissau) Gerso Fernandes	FW/MF	(Portugal) C.F. Os Belenenses	Undisclosed	
January 9, 2017	(Ghana) Latif Blessing	FW	(Ghana) Liberty Professionals F.C.	Undisclosed	
January 9, 2017	(United States) Christian Volesky	FW	(United States) Portland Timbers	Rights acquired in exchange for 4th Round pick in 2017 MLS SuperDraft	
January 10, 2017	(United States) Cameron Iwasa	FW	(United States) Sacramento Republic FC	Free Transfer	
January 10, 2017	(United States) Andrew Dykstra	GK	(United States) D.C. United	Re-Entry Draft	
January 13, 2017	(Spain) Ilie Sanchez	MF	(Germany) TSV 1860 Munich	Free Transfer	
January 30, 2017	(Lebanon) Soony Saad	FW	(Thailand) BEC Tero Sasana	Free Transfer	
June 29, 2017	(Spain) Cristian Lobato	MF	(Spain) Gimnàstic de Tarragona	Free Transfer	
August 11, 2017	(New Zealand) James Musa	DF	(United States) Swope Park Rangers	Signed from USL team	
August 25, 2017	(United States) Gianluca Busio	FW		HGP	
September 15, 2017	(United States) Kharlton Belmar	FW	(United States) Swope Park Rangers	Signed from USL team	
September 15, 2017	(Cape Verde) Kevin Oliveira	MF	(United States) Swope Park Rangers	Signed from USL team	

=== Out ===
Date	Player	Position	Destination club	Notes	Ref
October 28, 2016	(United States) Brad Davis	MF	None	Retired	
November 23, 2016	(United States) Jacob Peterson	MF	(United States) Atlanta United FC	Out of Contract, Signed with Atlanta United FC on December 21, 2016	
November 23, 2016	(Portugal) Nuno André Coelho	DF	(Portugal) G.D. Chaves	Option Declined	
November 23, 2016	(United States) Chance Myers	DF	(United States) Portland Timbers	Option Declined, later signed with Portland as a free agent	
November 23, 2016	(United States) Justin Mapp	MF		Option Declined	
November 23, 2016	(Honduras) Éver Alvarado	DF	(Honduras) CD Olimpia	Option Declined	
November 23, 2016	(Ghana) Emmanuel Appiah	MF	(United States) Saint Louis FC	Option Declined	
November 23, 2016	(United States) Jon Kempin	GK	(United States) LA Galaxy	Option Declined	
November 23, 2016	(United States) Connor Hallisey	MF		Option Declined	
December 12, 2016	(Brazil) Paulo Nagamura	MF	None	Retired	
December 13, 2016	(United States) Alec Kann	GK	(United States) Atlanta United FC	Expansion Draft	
February 3, 2017	(Kenya) Lawrence Olum	DF	(United States) Portland Timbers	Trade	
February 27, 2017	(United States) Benji Joya	MF		Waived	
February 27, 2017	(United States) Christian Volesky	FW	(United States) Saint Louis FC	Waived	
July 25, 2017	(United States) Dom Dwyer	FW	(United States) Orlando City SC	Traded	

=== Loans ===
Per Major League Soccer and club policies terms of the deals do not get disclosed.

==== In ====
Date	Player	Position	Loaned from	Notes	Ref
December 23, 2016	(Brazil) Igor Juliao	DF	(Brazil) Fluminense FC	Waived on June 29	

== Competitions ==
=== Match results ===
Win Tie Loss

==== Preseason ====
Kickoff times are in CST (UTC-06) unless shown otherwise

January 31, 2017	Sporting Kansas City	0–1	San Jose Earthquakes	Tucson, Arizona
		Report	Thompson 90'	Stadium: North Stadium at Kino Sports Complex

February 7, 2017	Sporting Kansas City	1–2	New England Revolution	Tucson, Arizona
12:00	Selbol 80'	Report	Smith 22'; Kamara 44'	Stadium: North Stadium at Kino Sports Complex

==== Desert Diamond Cup ====
February 15, 2017	Sporting Kansas City	1–1	Colorado Rapids	Tucson, Arizona
12:00				Stadium: North Stadium at Kino Sports Complex

February 18, 2017	Sporting Kansas City	3–0	New York Red Bulls	Tucson, Arizona
16:30				Stadium: North Stadium at Kino Sports Complex

February 22, 2017	Sporting Kansas City	2–6	New England Revolution	Tucson, Arizona
12:00				Stadium: North Stadium at Kino Sports Complex

February 25, 2017	Sporting Kansas City	0–1	New York City FC	Tucson, Arizona
				Stadium: North Stadium at Kino Sports Complex

==== Regular season ====
Kickoff times are in CDT (UTC-05) unless shown otherwise

March 4, 2017 CST 1	D.C. United	0 – 0	Sporting Kansas City	Washington, D.C.
18:00	Franklin (yellow card) 64'; Vincent (yellow card) 64'	Report	Sinovic (yellow card) 37'; Espinoza (yellow card) 72'	Stadium: RFK Stadium; Attendance: 18,268; Referee: Robert Sibiga

March 11, 2017 CST 2	Sporting Kansas City	0 – 0	FC Dallas	Kansas City, Kansas
20:00	Sinovic (yellow card) 79'; Dwyer (yellow card) 81'; Gerso (yellow card) 95'	Report	Guillen (yellow card) 4'; Figueroa (yellow card) 29'; Harris (yellow card) 69'; Gruezo (yellow card) 86'; Cermeno (yellow card) 92'	Stadium: Children's Mercy Park; Attendance: 19,117; Referee: Sorin Stoica

March 18, 2017 3	Sporting Kansas City	2 – 1	San Jose Earthquakes	Kansas City, Kansas
19:30	Dwyer (yellow card) 16'; Feilhaber 37'; Zusi (yellow card) 84'; Bingham 89' (o.g.)	Report	Urena (yellow card) 52'; Jungwirth 91'	Stadium: Children's Mercy Park; Attendance: 19,282; Referee: Jair Marrufo

March 31, 2017 4	Toronto FC	0 – 0	Sporting Kansas City	Toronto, Ontario, Canada
18:30	Altidore (yellow card) 81'	Report	Sánchez (yellow card) 69'	Stadium: BMO Field; Attendance: 27,909; Referee: Alan Kelly

April 9, 2017 5	Sporting Kansas City	3 – 1	Colorado Rapids	Kansas City, Kansas
18:00	Sinovic 6'; Sánchez (yellow card) 38'; Gerso 58'; Dwyer 85'	Report	Miller (yellow card) 84'; Watts (yellow card) 86'; Doyle 94+' (pen.)	Stadium: Children's Mercy Park; Attendance: 19,249; Referee: Allen Chapman

April 15, 2017 6	Portland Timbers	0 – 1	Sporting Kansas City	Portland, Oregon
21:30		Report	Opara (yellow card) 25'; Sinovic (yellow card) 52'; Dwyer 53'	Stadium: Providence Park; Attendance: 21,144; Referee: Drew Fischer

April 22, 2017 7	FC Dallas	1 – 0	Sporting Kansas City	Frisco, Texas
19:00	Figueroa 77'	Report		Stadium: Toyota Stadium; Attendance: 15,411; Referee: Kevin Stott

April 29, 2017 8	Sporting Kansas City	3 – 0	Real Salt Lake	Kansas City, Kansas
19:30	Feilhaber 17' (yellow card) 49'; Dwyer 51'; Espinoza (yellow card) 55'; Zusi (yellow card) 69'; Gerso (yellow card) 84' (goal) 95+'	Report	Mulholland (yellow card) 39'; Phillips (yellow card) 51'; Movsisyan (yellow card) 55'; Lennon (yellow card) 85'	Stadium: Children's Mercy Park; Attendance: 18,648; Referee: Jose Carlos Rivero

May 3, 2017 9	Sporting Kansas City	2 – 0	New York Red Bulls	Kansas City, Kansas
19:30	Opara (yellow card) 30'; Dwyer 46', 68' (yellow card) 51'	Report	Davis (yellow card) 62'; Lade (yellow card) 76'; Wright-Phillips (yellow card) 92'	Stadium: Children's Mercy Park; Attendance: 18,965; Referee: Allen Chapman

May 7, 2017 10	Minnesota United FC	2 – 0	Sporting Kansas City	Minneapolis, Minnesota
12:30	Danladi 22'; Ramirez 39' (yellow card) 51'; Calvo (yellow card) 72'	Report	Juliao (yellow card) 17'; Dwyer (yellow card) 72'	Stadium: TCF Bank Stadium; Attendance: 17,709; Referee: Alan Kelly

May 13, 2017 11	Orlando City SC	2 – 2	Sporting Kansas City	Orlando, Florida
18:00	Aja (yellow card) 11'; Larin 16'; Kaká 26'; Higuita (yellow card) 40'	Report	Blessing 9', 74' (yellow card) 79'; Zusi (yellow card) 48'; Sánchez (yellow card) 79'	Stadium: Orlando City Stadium; Attendance: 25,527; Referee: Ricardo Salazar

May 17, 2017 12	Sporting Kansas City	3 – 0	Seattle Sounders FC	Kansas City, Kansas
19:30	Gerso 56', 58', 69'	Report	Delem (yellow card) 3'; Alfaro (yellow card) 85'	Stadium: Children's Mercy Park; Attendance: 20,139; Referee: Ted Unkel

May 20, 2017 13	Vancouver Whitecaps FC	2 – 0	Sporting Kansas City	Vancouver, British Columbia, Canada
18:00	Techera 40'; Parker 67'; Laba (yellow card) 89'	Report	Espinoza (yellow card) 66'; Sinovic (yellow card) 77'	Stadium: BC Place; Attendance: 21,020; Referee: Baldomero Toledo

May 27, 2017 14	Colorado Rapids	1 – 0	Sporting Kansas City	Commerce City, Colorado
19:00	Ford 11'; Burling (yellow card) 19'; Miller (yellow card) 22'; Howard (yellow card) 86'; Doyle (yellow card) 89'	Report	Espinoza (yellow card) 41' (yellow-red card) 93+'	Stadium: Dick's Sporting Goods Park; Attendance: 17,648; Referee: Hilario Grajeda

June 3, 2017 15	Sporting Kansas City	3 – 0	Minnesota United FC	Kansas City, Kansas
16:00	Feilhaber (yellow card) 12'; Melia (yellow card) 44'; Opara 45+2'; Medranda 54'; Abdul-Salaam 87'	Report	Jome (yellow card) 7'; Warner (yellow card) 23'; Shuttleworth (yellow card) 43'	Stadium: Children's Mercy Park; Attendance: 20,361; Referee: Jorge González

June 10, 2017 16	Sporting Kansas City	1 – 1	Montreal Impact	Kansas City, Kansas
19:00	Gerso 24'	Report	Piatti (yellow card) 45+1'; Mancosu 82' (yellow card) 84'; Duvall (red card) 86'	Stadium: Children's Mercy Park; Attendance: 20,335; Referee: Robert Sibiga

June 17, 2017 17	San Jose Earthquakes	0 – 0	Sporting Kansas City	San Jose, California
20:00	Godoy (yellow card) 73'; Wondolowski (yellow card) 74'	Report	Besler (yellow card) 78'; Espinoza (yellow card) 86'	Stadium: Avaya Stadium; Attendance: 18,000; Referee: Armando Villarreal

June 24, 2017 18	LA Galaxy	1 – 2	Sporting Kansas City	Carson, California
21:30	Villarreal (yellow card) 33'; Smith (yellow card) 59'; Van Damme (yellow card) 81'	Report	Espinoza 22'; Opara 35'; Gerso (yellow card) 73'	Stadium: StubHub Center; Attendance: 20,140; Referee: Baldomero Toledo

July 1, 2017 19	Sporting Kansas City	1 – 1	Portland Timbers	Kansas City, Kansas
18:00	Latif (yellow card) 44'; Espinoza (yellow card) 45'; Sallói 60' (Espinoza); Ellis (yellow card) 85'	Report	Valeri 26' (Blanco); Adi (yellow card) 38'	Stadium: Children's Mercy Park; Attendance: 20,933; Referee: Alan Kelly

July 6, 2017 20	Sporting Kansas City	1 – 1	Philadelphia Union	Kansas City, Kansas
19:30	Diego Rubio 49' (Sallói); Abdul-Salaam (yellow card) 64'; Feilhaber (yellow card) 68'	Report	Medunjanin (yellow card) 68'; Alberg 69' (pen.)	Stadium: Children's Mercy Park; Attendance: 19,240; Referee: Ricardo Salazar

July 22, 2017 21	Real Salt Lake	1 – 1	Sporting Kansas City	Sandy, Utah
21:00	Silva 43' (Plata, Acosta); Sunny (yellow card) 53'; Acosta (yellow card) 56'; Beltran (yellow card) 71'	Report	Espinoza (yellow card) 40'; Ilie (yellow card) 47'; Feilhaber 59' (pen.); Gerso (yellow card) 77'	Stadium: Rio Tinto Stadium; Attendance: 19,316; Referee: Nima Saghafi

July 29, 2017 22	Sporting Kansas City	3 – 2	Chicago Fire	Kansas City, Kansas
19:30	Sallói 23'; Feilhaber 45+1'; Latif 51' (Rubio)	Report	Besler 28' (O.G.); Juninho (yellow card) 76'; Accam 77' (Doody); João Meira (yellow card) 90'	Stadium: Children's Mercy Park; Attendance: 20,313; Referee: Alan Kelly

August 6, 2017 23	Sporting Kansas City	1 – 1	Atlanta United FC	Kansas City, Kansas
19:00	Opara (yellow card) 27'; Feilhaber 59' (pen.)	Report	Larentowicz (yellow card) 21'; Carmona (yellow card) 24'; Asad (yellow card) 51'; González Pírez (yellow card) 61'; Ambrose (yellow card) 77'; Peterson 90+1'	Stadium: Children's Mercy Park; Attendance: 19,481; Referee: Chris Penso

August 12, 2017 24	Seattle Sounders FC	1 – 0	Sporting Kansas City	Seattle, Washington
15:00	Dempsey 36' (Morris, Roldan); Lodeiro (yellow card) 45+1'; Torres (yellow card) 66'	Report	Musa (yellow card) 27'; Medranda (yellow card) 93'	Stadium: CenturyLink Field; Attendance: 43,530; Referee: Baldomero Toledo

August 19, 2017 25	Sporting Kansas City	2 – 0	FC Dallas	Kansas City, Kansas
19:30	Diego Rubio 42' (Zusi); Ilie (yellow card) 48'; Gerso 90+2' (Zusi)	Report	Figueroa (yellow card) 80'	Stadium: Children's Mercy Park; Attendance: 19,869; Referee: Armando Villarreal
Note: 100th straight sellout

September 6, 2017 26	New York City FC	1 – 0	Sporting Kansas City	New York, New York
00:00	Moralez (yellow card) 28'; Harrison 84' (Allen); Allen (yellow card) 89'	Report	Espinoza (yellow card) 24'; Diego Rubio (yellow card) 90+2'	Stadium: Yankee Stadium; Attendance: 19,353; Referee: Ricardo Salazar

September 10, 2017 27	Columbus Crew SC	1 – 1	Sporting Kansas City	Columbus, Ohio
12:00	Mensah (yellow card) 13'; Kamara 45+1' (Santos); Williams (yellow card) 59'; Abu (yellow card) 85'	Report	Espinoza (yellow card) 15'; Lobato 19' (Besler); Feilhaber (yellow card) 53'	Stadium: Mapfre Stadium; Attendance: 17,089; Referee: Chris Penso

September 16, 2017 28	Sporting Kansas City	3 – 1	New England Revolution	Kansas City, Kansas
19:30	Gerso 16'; Diego Rubio (yellow card) 23' (goal) 45' (Gerso, Zusi), 58'; Medranda (yellow card) 26'	Report	Bunbury 4'; Németh (red card) 11'; Fagúndez (yellow card) 90+2'	Stadium: Children's Mercy Park; Attendance: 19,089; Referee: Jorge González

September 24, 2017 29	Sporting Kansas City	2 – 1	LA Galaxy	Kansas City, Kansas
12:00	Sallói 18' (Diego Rubio, Zusi); Diego Rubio 35' (Sinovic, Ilie)	Report	J. dos Santos (yellow card) 1'; Ciani (yellow card) 55'; Alessandrini 58'; McBean (yellow card) 90+2'	Stadium: Children's Mercy Park; Attendance: 19,028; Referee: Mark Geiger

September 30, 2017 30	Sporting Kansas City	0 – 1	Vancouver Whitecaps FC	Kansas City, Kansas
20:00	Hurtado 53' (Harvey); Davies (yellow card) 69'; Bolanos (red card) 90+3'	Report	Zusi (red card) 90+1'	Stadium: Children's Mercy Park; Attendance: 18,990; Referee: Baldomero Toledo

October 7, 2017 31	Minnesota United FC	1 – 1	Sporting Kansas City	Minneapolis, Minnesota
19:00	Thiesson (yellow card) 41'; Kallman 84' (Danladi); Greenspan (yellow card) 86' (yellow-red card) 90+1'	Report	Diego Rubio 45+2' (Latif); Sinovic (yellow card) 70'; Dykstra (yellow card) 72'	Stadium: TCF Bank Stadium; Attendance: 23,060; Referee: Jose Carlos Rivero

October 11, 2017 32	Houston Dynamo	2 – 1	Sporting Kansas City	Houston, Texas
19:00	Clark (yellow card) 45'; Martinez 63'; Wenger (yellow card) 79'	Report	Medranda 33' (Abdul-Salaam); Palmer-Brown 77' (OG); Ilie (yellow card) 87'	Stadium: BBVA Compass Stadium; Attendance: 15,724; Referee: Baldomero Toledo
Note: Postponed from August 26 due to Hurricane Harvey

October 15, 2017 33	Sporting Kansas City	0 – 0	Houston Dynamo	Kansas City, Kansas
16:00	Latif (yellow card) 90+4'	Report	Torres (yellow card) 67'; DeLaGarza (yellow card) 85'	Stadium: Children's Mercy Park; Attendance: 19,083; Referee: Kevin Stott

October 22, 2017 34	Real Salt Lake	2 – 1	Sporting Kansas City	Sandy, Utah
15:00	Silva 3'; Lennon 41'	Report	Sallói (yellow card) 28'; Besler (yellow card) 72'; Opara 89' (Zusi)	Stadium: Rio Tinto Stadium; Attendance: 19,102; Referee: Ricardo Salazar

==== MLS Cup Playoffs ====
Kickoff times are in CDT (UTC-05) unless shown otherwise

October 26, 2017 Knockout Round	Houston Dynamo	1 – 0 (a.e.t.)	Sporting Kansas City	Houston, Texas
20:30	Senderos (yellow card) 14'; Clark (yellow card) 21'; Machado (yellow card) 76'; Quioto (yellow card) 109'; Elis 94' (Sánchez) (yellow card) 120+1'	Report	Zusi (yellow card) 45+2'; Ilie (yellow card) 53'; Espinoza (yellow card) 65'; Diego Rubio (yellow card) 89'; Dykstra (yellow card) 120+3'	Stadium: BBVA Compass Stadium; Attendance: 14,126; Referee: Mark Geiger

==== U.S. Open Cup ====
Kickoff times are in CDT (UTC-05) unless shown otherwise

June 14, 2017 Fourth Round	Sporting Kansas City	4–0	Minnesota United FC	Kansas City, Kansas
19:30	Opara 43' (Zusi); Gerso 45+1'; Dwyer 72' (Gerso); Sallói 83' (Espinoza)	Report	Davis (yellow card) 90'; Warner (yellow card) 90+4'	Stadium: Children's Mercy Park; Attendance: 15,260; Referee: Juan Guzman

June 28, 2017 Fifth Round	Houston Dynamo	0–2	Sporting Kansas City	Houston, Texas
17:30	Bird (yellow card) 23'; Wenger (yellow card) 48'; Rodriguez (yellow card) 64'	Report	Espinoza (yellow card) 49'; Opara 61' (Ellis, Sánchez); Gerso 91+' (Blessing)	Stadium: BBVA Compass Stadium; Referee: Fotis Bazakos

July 11, 2017 Quarterfinal	Sporting Kansas City	3–0 (a.e.t.)	FC Dallas	Kansas City, Kansas
19:30	Sinovic (red card) 15'; Espinoza (yellow card) 45+3'; Medranda (yellow card) 65'; Blessing 105+3' (Feilhaber), 105+8' (Medranda); Sallói 118' (Feilhaber)	Report	Ulloa (yellow card) 45+2'; Díaz (yellow card) 62'; Urruti (yellow card) 90' (yellow-red card) 101'; Morales (red card) 105+5'; Harris (yellow card) 120'	Stadium: Children's Mercy Park; Attendance: 15,016; Referee: Younes Marrakchi

August 9, 2017 Semifinal	Sporting Kansas City	1–1 (a.e.t.) (5–4 p)	San Jose Earthquakes	Kansas City, Kansas
19:30	Rubio 32' (Medranda)	Report	Hosen 4' (Qazaishvili); Cerén (yellow card) 74'; Affolter (yellow card) 92'; Imperiale (yellow card) 111'	Stadium: Children's Mercy Park; Attendance: 16,193; Referee: Nima Saghafi
	Penalties
	Feilhaber (penalty missed); Rubio (penalty scored); Sánchez (penalty scored); Medranda (penalty scored); Sallói (penalty scored); Besler (penalty scored)		(penalty missed) Wondolowski; (penalty scored) Imperiale; (penalty scored) Cerén; (penalty scored) Qazaishvili; (penalty scored) Jungwirth; (penalty missed) Bernárdez

September 20, 2017 Final	Sporting Kansas City	2–1	New York Red Bulls	Kansas City, Kansas
19:30	Sinovic (yellow card) 4'; Blessing 25' (Zusi); Sallói 66' (Feilhaber); Opara (yellow card) 90+6'	Report	Long (yellow card) 27'; Adams (yellow card) 57'; Wright Phillips 90+1'	Stadium: Children's Mercy Park; Attendance: 21,523; Referee: Hilario Grajeda

== Player statistics ==
=== Top scorers ===
Rank	Position	Number	Name	MLS	MLS Cup	Open Cup	Total
1	FW	7	(Guinea-Bissau) Gerso Fernandes	8	0	2	10
2	FW	11	(Chile) Diego Rubio	5	0	2	7
3	FW	9	(Ghana) Latif Blessing	3	0	3	6
3	FW	14	(United States) Dom Dwyer	5	0	1	6
3	FW	30	(Hungary) Dániel Sallói	3	0	3	6
4	DF	3	(United States) Ike Opara	3	0	2	5
4	MF	10	(United States) Benny Feilhaber	5	0	0	5
5	MF	93	(Colombia) Jimmy Medranda	2	0	0	2
6	DF	15	(United States) Seth Sinovic	1	0	0	1
6	DF	17	(United States) Saad Abdul-Salaam	1	0	0	1
6	MF	19	(Spain) Cristian Lobato	1	0	0	1
6	MF	27	(Honduras) Roger Espinoza	1	0	0	1
Total				37	0	13	50

As of October 26, 2017

=== Disciplinary record ===
Number	Nation	Position	Name	MLS		U.S. Open Cup		Total	
Number	Nation	Position	Name	Booked	Sent off (straight red)	Booked	Sent off (straight red)	Booked	Sent off (straight red)
3	(United States)	DF	Ike Opara	3	0	1	0	4	0
4	(United States)	DF	Kevin Ellis	1	0	0	0	1	0
5	(United States)	DF	Matt Besler	2	0	0	0	2	0
6	(Spain)	MF	Ilie Sánchez	7	0	0	0	7	0
7	(Guinea-Bissau)	FW	Gerso	4	0	0	0	4	0
8	(United States)	MF	Graham Zusi	4	1	0	0	4	1
9	(Ghana)	FW	Latif Blessing	3	0	0	0	3	0
10	(United States)	MF	Benny Feilhaber	4	0	0	0	4	0
11	(Chile)	FW	Diego Rubio	3	0	0	0	3	0
14	(United States)	FW	Dom Dwyer	4	0	0	0	4	0
15	(United States)	DF	Seth Sinovic	5	0	1	1	6	1
17	(United States)	DF	Saad Abdul-Salaam	1	0	0	0	1	0
21	(United States)	GK	Andrew Dykstra	2	0	0	0	2	0
27	(Honduras)	MF	Roger Espinoza	11	1	2	0	13	1
29	(United States)	GK	Tim Melia	1	0	0	0	1	0
30	(Hungary)	FW	Dániel Sallói	1	0	0	0	1	0
40	(Brazil)	DF	Igor Julião	1	0	0	0	1	0
41	(New Zealand)	DF	James Musa	1	0	0	0	1	0
94	(Colombia)	MF	Jimmy Medranda	2	0	1	0	3	0
			TOTALS	60	2	5	1	65	3

As of October 26, 2017.
