= Ike Opara =

American soccer player (born 1989)

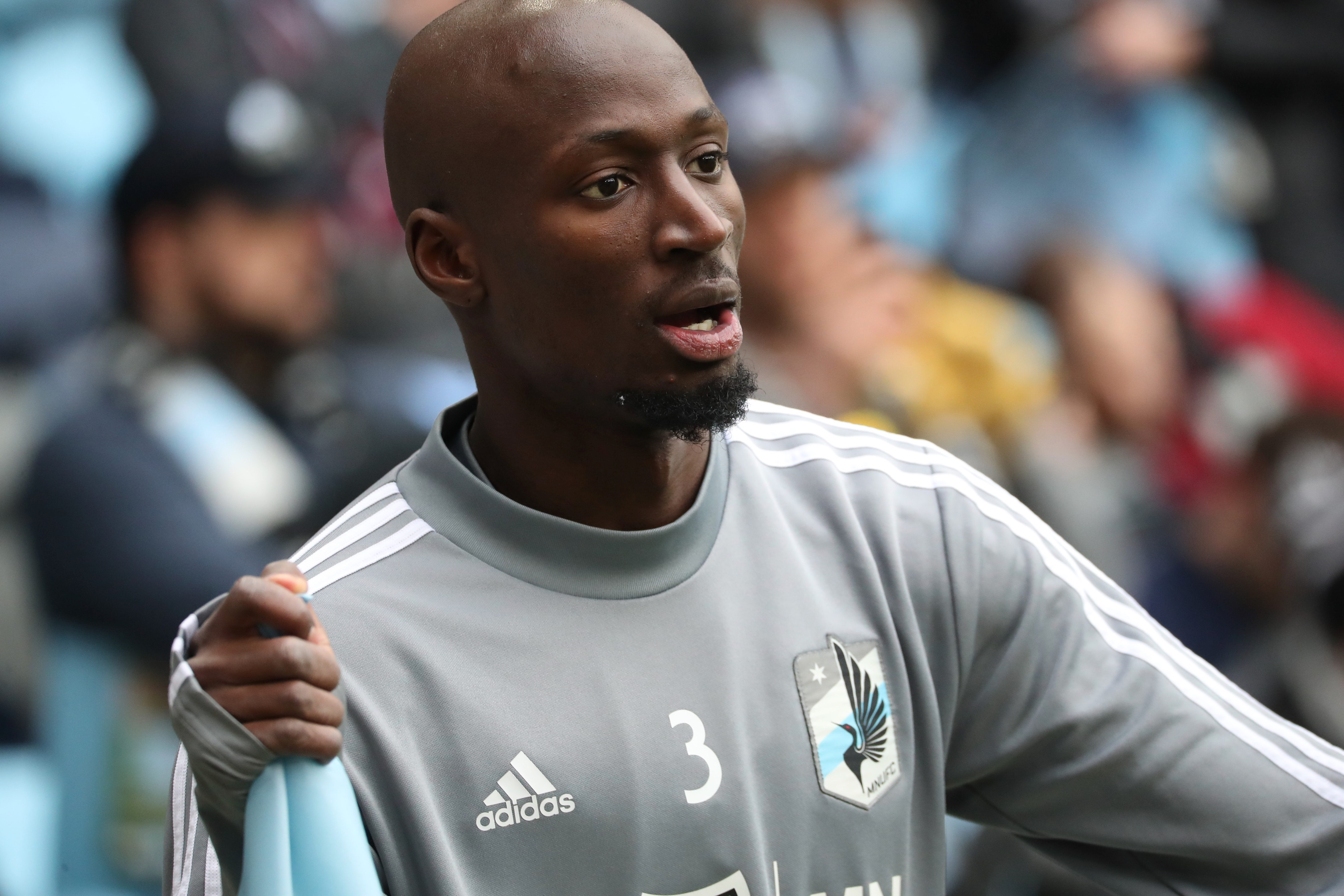
- Opara with Minnesota United in 2019

Personal information
- Full name: Ikenna Martin Opara
- Date of birth: February 21, 1989 (age 37)
- Place of birth: Durham, North Carolina, United States
- Height: 6 ft 2 in (1.88 m)
- Position: Centre back

College career
Years	Team	Apps	(Gls)
2007–2009	Wake Forest Demon Deacons	65	(9)

Senior career*
Years	Team	Apps	(Gls)
2008–2009	Cary Clarets	13	(0)
2010–2012	San Jose Earthquakes	35	(3)
2013–2018	Sporting Kansas City	113	(12)
2019–2021	Minnesota United	32	(5)
Total		193	(20)

International career^{‡}
2009	United States U20	7	(0)
2012	United States U23	4	(0)
2018	United States	1	(0)

Managerial career
- 2021–2022: Nashville SC (scout)
- 2022–2025: Sporting Kansas City II (assistant)
- 2025: Sporting Kansas City II (interim)
- * Club domestic league appearances and goals as of August 5, 2021 ‡ National team caps and goals as of January 28, 2018

Ikenna Martin "Ike" Opara (/oʊˈpɑːrə/;born February 21, 1989) is an American former professional soccer player.

== Career ==
=== College and amateur ===
Opara played college soccer at Wake Forest University from 2007 to 2009 where he appeared in 65 games scoring nine goals and adding three assists. He was a member of Wake Forest's 2007 NCAA College Cup Championship team. He was named ACC Defensive Player of the year in 2008 and 2009.

During his college years Opara also played two seasons for Cary Clarets in the USL Premier Development League.

=== Professional ===
==== San Jose Earthquakes ====
Opara was drafted in the first round (3rd overall) of the 2010 MLS SuperDraft by San Jose Earthquakes.

He made his professional debut on March 27, 2010, in San Jose's opening game of the 2010 MLS season against Real Salt Lake, and scored his first professional career goal – an away match winner – against Chicago Fire on April 10, 2010.

His time with the Earthquakes was plagued by repeated foot injuries.

==== Sporting Kansas City ====
Opara was traded to Sporting Kansas City from San Jose on December 12, 2012, for Kansas City's natural second-round selection in the 2013 MLS SuperDraft.

Opara made his league debut for SKC on March 23, 2013, in a 0–0 away draw with the New England Revolution. He scored his first league goal for the club about four months after his debut, in a 2–1 away win over Real Salt Lake on July 20, 2013. His goal, scored in the 96th minute, won the match for Sporting. Although he was on the bench, Opara and SKC won the 2013 MLS Cup over Real Salt Lake on penalties. Opara logged 21 appearances and was named Sporting KC Newcomer of the Year for 2013.

Opara would go on to establish himself as a regular, solidifying one of the top defenses in MLS over the next few seasons, alongside his central back partner Matt Besler, converted right back Graham Zusi and left back Seth Sinovic. This group won the 2015 and 2017 U.S. Open Cups alongside their stellar keeper, Tim Melia. On November 10, 2017, Opara was awarded the MLS Defender of the Year Award and was selected to the MLS Best XI for his spectacular performances during the 2017 MLS season, joining his fellow SKC player, goalie Tim Melia, on the list.

==== Minnesota United FC ====
On January 28, 2019 Sporting KC traded Opara to Minnesota United FC for $900,000 of TAM and an additional $100,000 contingent upon Minnesota qualifying for the playoffs for the first time in its brief franchise history. He scored his first goal for Minnesota against the Seattle Sounders off a set piece in a 1–1 home draw on May 4, 2019. He was awarded the MLS Defender of the Year Award for 2019 On August 5, 2021, Minnesota opted to buyout Opara's contract.

==== National team ====
Opara was selected to the United States Men's National Team on January 8, 2018. After attending the January camp for the national team, he played the full 90 minutes in a friendly versus Bosnia and Herzegovina, his only cap to date.

== Coaching ==
=== Sporting Kansas City II ===
After departing Minnesota United, Opara served as a scout for Nashville SC. Opara returned to Sporting Kansas City in January 2022, being named assistant coach for the club's MLS Next Pro side Sporting Kansas City II.

On 12 August 2025, Opara was named the interim head coach for Sporting Kansas City II.

== Career statistics ==
=== Club ===
As of match played March 8, 2020

Appearances and goals by club, season and competition
Club	Season	League			National cup		Continental		Other		Total	
Club	Season	Division	Apps	Goals	Apps	Goals	Apps	Goals	Apps	Goals	Apps	Goals
Cary Clarets	2008	USL PDL	6	0	—		—		—		6	0
Cary Clarets	2009	USL PDL	7	0	—		—		—		7	0
Cary Clarets	Total		13	0	0	0	0	0	0	0	13	0
San Jose Earthquakes	2010	MLS	11	3	—		—		0	0	11	3
San Jose Earthquakes	2011	MLS	8	0	—		—		—		8	0
San Jose Earthquakes	2012	MLS	16	0	3	0	—		1 (Note: Appearance(s) in MLS Cup Playoffs)	0	20	0
San Jose Earthquakes	Total		35	3	3	0	0	0	1	0	39	3
Sporting Kansas City	2013	MLS	18	3	1	0	3 (Note: Appearance(s) in CONCACAF Champions League)	1	3	0	25	4
Sporting Kansas City	2014	MLS	3	0	—		2	0	—		5	0
Sporting Kansas City	2015	MLS	6	2	—		—		0	0	6	2
Sporting Kansas City	2016	MLS	25	1	1	0	2	0	0	0	28	1
Sporting Kansas City	2017	MLS	30	3	5	2	—		1	0	36	5
Sporting Kansas City	2018	MLS	31	3	1	0	—		4	0	36	3
Sporting Kansas City	Total		113	12	8	2	7	1	8	0	136	15
Minnesota United	2019	MLS	30	3	4	0	—		1	0	35	3
Minnesota United	2020	MLS	2	2	—		—		0	0	2	2
Minnesota United	Total		32	5	4	0	0	0	1	0	37	5
Career total			193	20	15	2	7	1	10	0	225	23

=== International ===
As of match played January 28, 2018

Appearances and goals by national team and year
National team	Year	Apps	Goals
United States	2018	1	0
Total		1	0

== Honors ==
Sporting Kansas City

- MLS Cup: 2013
- Eastern Conference Championship (Playoffs): 2013
- U.S. Open Cup: 2015, 2017

Individual

- MLS Best XI: 2017, 2019
- MLS Defender of the Year: 2017, 2019
