= 2020 Sporting Kansas City season =

Sporting Kansas City
2020 season
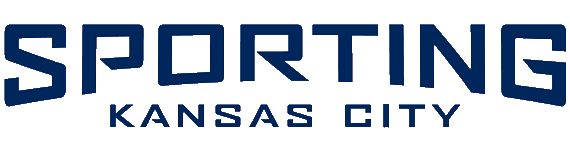
- Owner: Sporting Club
- Head coach: Peter Vermes
- Stadium: Children's Mercy Park
- MLS: Conference: 1st Overall: 3rd
- Playoffs: Conference Semifinals
- U.S. Open Cup: Canceled
- MLS is Back Tournament: Quarter-finals
- Top goalscorer: League: Gadi Kinda; Alan Pulido; Johnny Russell (6 each); All: Alan Pulido (7)
- Highest home attendance: League: 21,188 (March 7 vs. Houston Dynamo); All: 21,188 (March 7 vs. Houston Dynamo)
- Lowest home attendance: League: 2,000 (August 25 vs. Houston Dynamo); All: 2,000 (August 25 vs. Houston Dynamo)
- Average home league attendance: League: 21,188; All: 21,188
- Biggest win: 4–0 (vs. Houston Dynamo on March 7, 2020) and (vs. Colorado Rapids on October 24, 2020)
- Biggest defeat: 2–5 (vs. Houston Dynamo on August 25, 2020); 0–3 (vs. Minnesota United FC on December 3, 2020)
Home colors	Away colors

The 2020 Sporting Kansas City season was the twenty-fifth season of the team's existence in Major League Soccer and the tenth year played under the Sporting Kansas City moniker. The season was suspended on March 12, for 30 days, due to the COVID-19 pandemic. Following that decision, on March 19 Major League Soccer extended its temporary suspension until May 10. Following that decision, on April 17 Major League Soccer extended its temporary suspension until June 8.

== Summary ==
=== Preseason ===
Sporting will spend the whole of its pre-season training camp in Scottsdale, Arizona for the sixth straight year, led by Coach and Sporting Director Peter Vermes. From January 19 to Feb 1 and from Feb. 8–22 the club will practice in Scottsdale before kicking off its 25th season in Major League Soccer on Feb 29 or March 1.

== Roster ==
Note: Flags indicate national team as defined under FIFA eligibility rules; some limited exceptions apply. Players may hold more than one non-FIFA nationality. Squad correct as of August 16, 2019.

No.	Pos.	Nation	Player
1	GK	MEX	Richard Sánchez
2	DF	HUN	Botond Baráth
3	DF	ESP	Andreu Fontas
4	DF	CRO	Roberto Punčec
5	DF	USA	Matt Besler (Captain)
6	MF	ESP	Ilie Sánchez
7	FW	SCO	Johnny Russell (DP)
8	DF	USA	Graham Zusi
9	FW	MEX	Alan Pulido (DP)
10	MF	CHI	Felipe Gutiérrez (DP)
11	FW	USA	Khiry Shelton
12	FW	GNB	Gerso Fernandes
13	DF	USA	Amadou Dia
15	MF	HON	Roger Espinoza
16	DF	USA	Graham Smith
17	MF	ISR	Gadi Kinda
18	GK	USA	Eric Dick
19	FW	USA	Erik Hurtado
20	FW	HUN	Dániel Sallói (HGP)
21	MF	COL	Felipe Hernandez (HGP)
22	DF	NZL	Winston Reid
23	FW	USA	Tyler Freeman (HGP)
24	GK	USA	John Pulskamp
26	DF	USA	Jaylin Lindsey (HGP)
27	MF	USA	Gianluca Busio (HGP)
28	DF	USA	Cameron Duke (HGP)
29	GK	USA	Tim Melia
36	DF	POR	Luís Martins
75	MF	USA	Wan Kuzain

== Player movement ==
=== In ===
Per Major League Soccer and club policies terms of the deals do not get disclosed.

Date	Player	Position	Previous club	Fee/notes	Ref
November 26, 2019	(Mexico) Richard Sánchez	GK	(United States) Chicago Fire FC	2019 MLS Re-Entry Draft	
December 4, 2019	(Croatia) Roberto Punčec	DF	(Croatia) Rijeka	Undisclosed	
December 9, 2019	(United States) Khiry Shelton	FW	(Germany) SC Paderborn 07	Undisclosed	
December 10, 2019	(Mexico) Alan Pulido	FW	(Mexico) C.D. Guadalajara	Undisclosed	
January 10, 2020	(United States) Amadou Dia	DF	(United States) Phoenix Rising FC	Signed for 2020 season with contract options through 2022	
February 24, 2020	(United States) John Pulskamp	GK	(United States) Sporting Kansas City II	Promotion to first team	

==== Draft picks ====
Draft picks are not automatically signed to the team roster. Only trades involving draft picks and executed after the start of 2020 MLS SuperDraft will be listed in the notes.

Round	Pick Number	Player	Position	School
3	58	(United States) Jaret Townsend	MF	University of Washington
4	84	(United States) James Kasak	FW	Virginia Tech

=== Out ===
Date	Player	Position	Destination club	Notes	Ref
November 19, 2019	(Colombia) Jimmy Medranda	MF	(United States) Nashville SC	Selected in 2019 MLS Expansion Draft	
November 19, 2019	(United States) Adrian Zendejas	GK	(United States) Nashville SC	Traded for $125,000 in 2020 TAM and $50,000 in 2020 GAM	
November 21, 2019	(United States) Seth Sinovic	DF	(United States) New England Revolution	Option Declined	
November 21, 2019	(United States) Benny Feilhaber	MF	Retired	Option Declined	
November 21, 2019	(United States) Gedion Zelalem	MF	(United States) New York City FC	Option Declined	
November 21, 2019	(Hungary) Krisztián Németh	FW	(Slovakia) DAC Dunajská Streda	Option Declined	
November 21, 2019	(Liechtenstein) Nicolas Hasler	DF	(Switzerland) FC Thun	Option Declined	
November 21, 2019	(Costa Rica) Rodney Wallace	DF	Retired	Option Declined	

=== Loans ===
Per Major League Soccer and club policies terms of the deals do not get disclosed.

==== In ====
Date	Player	Position	Loaned from	Notes	Ref
January 23, 2020	(Israel) Gadi Kinda	MF	Beitar Jerusalem F.C.	One-year loan using Targeted Allocation Money (TAM), with an option to exercise a permanent transfer at the end of 2020	
February 14, 2020	(New Zealand) Winston Reid	DF	West Ham United F.C.	One-year loan	

==== Out ====
Date	Player	Position	Loaned to	Notes	Ref
February 4, 2020	(United States) Eric Dick	GK	Phoenix Rising FC	Loaned to Phoenix Rising FC (USL Championship) for the 2020 season.	

== Competitions ==
=== Preseason ===
Kickoff times are in CST (UTC-06) unless shown otherwise

Preseason schedule announced on January 14, 2020.

January 25, 2020	Phoenix Rising FC Trialists	0–4	Sporting Kansas City	Tempe, Arizona
12:00 pm		Report	Sallói 23'; Busio 43', 50'; Harris 70'	Stadium: Casino Arizona Field
Note: Played in three 30-minute periods.

February 1, 2020	Sporting Kansas City	4–0	FC Cincinnati	Casa Grande, Arizona
12:00 pm	Sallói 11', (yellow card) 27'; Espinoza 44'; Harris 65'; Busio (yellow card) 80'; Russell 82'	Report	Gyau (yellow card) 55'; Stanko (yellow card) 62'	Stadium: Grande Sports World

February 12, 2020	Sporting Kansas City	0–2	Columbus Crew	Casa Grande, Arizona
12:00 pm		Report	Zardes 1'; Santos 43' (pen.)	Stadium: Grande Sports World

==== Visit Tucson Sun Cup ====
February 15, 2020	Sporting Kansas City	0–0	Real Salt Lake	Tucson, Arizona
5:00 pm	Silva (yellow card) 72'; Herrera (yellow card) 76'	Report	Sánchez (yellow card) 40'; Duke (yellow card) 86'	Stadium: Kino Sports Complex; Referee: Victor Rivas
Note: Preseason

February 19, 2020	Phoenix Rising FC	2–1	Sporting Kansas City	Tempe, Arizona
8:00 pm	Moar 66'; Calistri 78'	Report	Russell 56'	Stadium: Casino Arizona Field

February 22, 2020	Sporting Kansas City	1–2	New York Red Bulls	Tucson, Arizona
3:00 pm	Kinda 61'	Report	Valot 59'; Cásseres 86' (pen.)	Stadium: Kino Sports Complex

=== MLS is Back Tournament ===
==== Group stage ====
Group D results
Pos	Team	Pld	W	D	L	GF	GA	GD	Pts	Qualification
1	Sporting Kansas City	3	2	0	1	6	4	+2	6	Advanced to knockout stage
2	Minnesota United FC	3	1	2	0	4	3	+1	5	Advanced to knockout stage
3	Real Salt Lake	3	1	1	1	2	2	0	4	Advanced to knockout stage
4	Colorado Rapids	3	0	1	2	4	7	−3	1	

Source: MLS
July 12, 2020
7:00 pm CDT

Sporting Kansas City	1–2	Minnesota United FC
Shelton 43'	Report	Shelton 90+2' (o.g.); Molino 90+7'

ESPN Wide World of Sports Complex, Bay Lake, Florida

July 17, 2020
7:00 pm CDT

Sporting Kansas City	3–2	Colorado Rapids
Shelton 65'; Pulido 72'; Zusi 90+1'	Report	Acosta 6'; Lewis 84'

ESPN Wide World of Sports Complex, Bay Lake, Florida
Referee: David Gantar

July 22, 2020
8:00 am CDT

Real Salt Lake	0–2	Sporting Kansas City
Holt (yellow card) 20'; Johnson (yellow card) 40'; Beckerman (yellow card) 55'; Glad (yellow card) 71'	Report	Russell 1'; Sánchez (yellow card) 36'; Busio (yellow card) 56'; Smith (yellow card) 62'; Gerso 86'

ESPN Wide World of Sports Complex, Bay Lake, Florida
Referee: Fotis Bazakos

==== Knockout stage ====
July 26, 2020
10:00 pm CDT
Round of 16

Sporting Kansas City	0–0	Vancouver Whitecaps FC
Kinda (yellow card) 9'	Report	Owusu (yellow card) 47'; Gutiérrez (yellow card) 59'
Penalties
Pulido (penalty scored); Ilie (penalty scored); Sallói (penalty missed); Busio (penalty scored)	3–1	(penalty missed) Dájome; (penalty scored) Owusu; (penalty missed) Derek Cornelius; (penalty missed) Reyna

ESPN Wide World of Sports Complex, Bay Lake, Florida
Referee: Victor Rivas

July 30, 2020
7:00 pm CDT
Quarterfinals

Philadelphia Union	3–1	Sporting Kansas City
Monteiro 24'; Santos 26', 39'	Report	Pulido 45+1'

ESPN Wide World of Sports Complex, Bay Lake, Florida
Referee: Ramy Touchan

=== Regular season ===
Kickoff times are in CDT (UTC-06) unless shown otherwise

February 29, 2020 1	Vancouver Whitecaps FC	1–3	Sporting Kansas City	Vancouver, British Columbia, Canada
9:30 pm	Cornelius (yellow card) 23'; Nerwinski 28'	Report	Kinda (yellow card) 3', (goal) 39'; Pulido 17'; Shelton (yellow card) 57'; Hurtado 90+5'	Stadium: BC Place; Attendance: 22,120; Referee: Ted Unkel
Note: Season Opener

March 7, 2020 2	Sporting Kansas City	4–0	Houston Dynamo	Kansas City, Kansas
7:30 pm	Pulido 16'; Espinoza 26'; Kinda 65'; Shelton 77'	Report		Stadium: Children's Mercy Park; Attendance: 21,188; Referee: Allen Chapman
Note: Home Opener

August 21, 2020 6	Minnesota United FC	1–2	Sporting Kansas City	Saint Paul, Minnesota
6:30 pm	Aja (yellow card) 24'; Lindsey 32' (o.g.); Alonso (yellow card) 90+3'	Report	Kinda 12'; Busio (yellow card) 46'; Boxall 55' (o.g.); Pulido (yellow card) 77'; Duke (yellow card) 90+5'	Stadium: Allianz Field; Referee: Ramy Touchan

August 25, 2020 7	Sporting Kansas City	2–5	Houston Dynamo	Kansas City, Kansas
7:30 pm	Russell 26'; Busio (yellow card) 38'; Kinda 49'	Report	Elis 17'; Vera (yellow card) 25'; Ramirez 44'; Hansen 48'; Quintero 57', 61'	Stadium: Children's Mercy Park; Attendance: 2,000; Referee: Joseph Dickerson

August 29, 2020 8	Colorado Rapids	1–1	Sporting Kansas City	Commerce City, Colorado
8:00 PM	Price (yellow card) 47'; Acosta (yellow card) 52'; Bassett 57'; Rubio (yellow card) 82'	Report	Smith (yellow card) 63'; Kinda (yellow card) 65' (yellow-red card) 78'; Busio 67'	Stadium: Dick's Sporting Goods Park; Referee: Armando Villarreal

September 2, 2020 9	Sporting Kansas City	1–1	FC Dallas	Kansas City, Kansas
7:30PM CDT	Shelton 45+3'	Report	Jara 9'; Servania (yellow card) 31'; Barrios (yellow card) 54'; Santos (yellow card) 84'	Stadium: Children's Mercy Park; Referee: Ramy Touchan

September 5, 2020 10	Houston Dynamo	2–1	Sporting Kansas City	Houston, Texas
7:00 PM CDT	Elis 59'; Manotas 85'; Figueroa (yellow card) 90+1'	Report	Hurtado 30'	Stadium: BBVA Compass Stadium; Referee: Timothy Ford

September 13, 2020 11	Sporting Kansas City	1–0	Minnesota United FC	Kansas City, Kansas
7:30PM CDT	Russell 80'; Busio (yellow card) 84'; Punčec (yellow card) 87'; Gerso (yellow card) 90+3'	Report	Dotson (yellow card) 90+2'	Stadium: Children's Mercy Park; Referee: Kevin Stott

September 19, 2020 12	Sporting Kansas City	2–3	FC Dallas	Kansas City, Kansas
2:30PM CDT	Busio (yellow card) 11'; Russell 53', 83', (yellow card) 80'	Report	Jara 42', 48', (yellow card) 73'; Barrios (yellow card) 75'; Acosta (yellow card) 75' (yellow-red card) 90'; Luchi Gonzalez (yellow card) 75'; Bressan (yellow card) 82'; Hollingshead 86'; Santos (yellow card) 90+4'	Stadium: Children's Mercy Park; Referee: Alex Chilowicz

September 23, 2020 13	Sporting Kansas City	1–2	Orlando City SC	Kansas City, Kansas
6:30pm CDT	Besler (yellow card) 24'; Shelton (yellow card) 51'; Kinda (yellow card) 85'; Russell 53'	Report	Schlegel (yellow card) 9'; Akindele 36'; Michel 38'; Pereyra (yellow card) 77'; Perea (yellow card) 78'	Stadium: Children's Mercy Park; Referee: Victor Rivas

September 27, 2020 14	Colorado Rapids	P–P	Sporting Kansas City	Commerce City, Colorado
8:00 pm CDT				Stadium: Dick's Sporting Goods Park
Note: Match postponed due to multiple positive COVID-19 tests in the Rapids organization.

October 3, 2020 15	Houston Dynamo	1–2	Sporting Kansas City	Houston, Texas
7:00 pm CDT	Struna (yellow card) 45+1'; Vera (yellow card) 72'; Quintero (yellow card) 77'; Junqua 84'; Figueroa (yellow card) 90+5'	Report	Pulido 34', 73'; Dia (yellow card) 39'; Reid (yellow card) 77'; Sánchez (yellow card) 81'; Espinoza (yellow card) 90'; Melia (yellow card) 90+3'	Stadium: BBVA Stadium; Referee: Kevin Stott

October 7, 2020 16	Sporting Kansas City	1–0	Chicago Fire	Kansas City, Kansas
7:30 pm CDT	Melia (yellow card) 1'; Espinoza (yellow card) 24'; Reid (yellow card) 62', (goal) 67'; Russell (yellow card) 77'; Shelton (yellow card) 80'	Report	Calvo (yellow card) 19'; Herbers (yellow card) 19'; Sekulić (yellow card) 58'	Stadium: Children's Mercy Park; Referee: Marcos de Oliveira

October 11, 2020 17	Sporting Kansas City	2–1	Nashville SC	Kansas City, Kansas
6:30 pm CDT	Sánchez (yellow card) 52'; Gerso 53'; Hurtado 79'	Report	Johnston (yellow card) 12' (yellow-red card) 54'; Zimmerman 15'; Lovitz (yellow card) 38'; Jones (yellow card) 76'	Stadium: Children's Mercy Park; Referee: Fotis Bazakos

October 14, 2020 18	FC Dallas	1–0	Sporting Kansas City	Frisco, Texas
7:30 pm CDT	Hollingshead 43'; Barrios (yellow card) 45'; Ziegler (yellow card) 45+2'	Report	Dia (yellow card) 42'	Stadium: Toyota Stadium; Attendance: 2,898; Referee: Armando Villarreal

October 17, 2020 19	Chicago Fire	2–2	Sporting Kansas City	Chicago, Illinois
2:30 pm CDT	Pineda (yellow card) 22'; Berić 45+1'; Mihailovic 90+5'	Report	Hurtado 35'; Kinda 83'	Stadium: Soldier Field; Referee: David Gantar

October 21, 2020 14	Colorado Rapids	v	Sporting Kansas City	Commerce City, Colorado
8:00 pm CDT				Stadium: Dick's Sporting Goods Park
Note: Reschedule of postponed September 27th match. Match was postponed again after a staff member from the Colorado Rapids tested positive for COVID-19.

October 24, 2020 20	Sporting Kansas City	4–0	Colorado Rapids	Kansas City, Kansas
7:30 pm CDT	Dia (yellow card) 11'; Pulido 54'; Fontàs 67'; Shelton (yellow card) 74'; Lindsey (yellow card) 85'; Kinda 88'; Gerso 90+3', (yellow card) 90+4'	Report	Warner (yellow card) 23'; Abubakar (yellow card) 47'	Stadium: Children's Mercy Park; Referee: Drew Fischer

October 28, 2020 21	FC Cincinnati	0–1	Sporting Kansas City	Cincinnati, Ohio
6:30 pm CDT	de Jong (penalty missed) 63'	Report	Espinoza 57'; Punčec (yellow card) 60'	Stadium: Nippert Stadium; Referee: David Gantar

November 1, 2020 22	Sporting Kansas City	Cancelled	Minnesota United FC	Kansas City, Kansas
6:30 pm CDT				Stadium: Children's Mercy Park
Note: Match cancelled due to multiple covid positives in the MNUFC organization and a lack of late season opportunities to reschedule.

November 8, 2020 23	Real Salt Lake	0–2	Sporting Kansas City	Sandy, Utah
5:30 pm CDT		Report	Martins (yellow card) 39'; Shelton 45'; Hurtado 48'; Russell (yellow card) 87'	Stadium: Rio Tinto Stadium; Attendance: 2,770; Referee: Kevin Stott

=== MLS Cup Playoffs ===
November 22, 2020 First round	Sporting Kansas City	3–3 (a.e.t.) (3–0 p)	San Jose Earthquakes	Kansas City, Kansas
3:00 pm CST	R. Espinoza 4'; Reid (yellow card) 39'; Ilie 47'; Dia (yellow card) 78'; R. Espinoza (yellow card) 79'; Russell (yellow card) 86'; Busio 90+1'	Report	Fierro 22'; Lima (yellow card) 28'; Salinas 34'; López (yellow card) 56'; C. Espinoza (yellow card) 85'; Wondolowski 90+7'	Stadium: Children's Mercy Park; Referee: Nima Saghafi
	Penalties
	Russell (penalty scored); Ilie (penalty scored); Shelton (penalty scored)		(penalty missed) Alanís; (penalty missed) Yueill; (penalty missed) C. Espinoza

December 3, 2020 Conf. Semifinals	Sporting Kansas City	0–3	Minnesota United FC	Kansas City, Kansas
7:30 PM CST		Report	Molino 27', 35'; Dibassy 39', (yellow card) 82'; Reynoso (yellow card) 42'; Greguš (yellow card) 57'; Gasper (yellow card) 80'; Hairston (yellow card) 84'	Stadium: Children's Mercy Park; Referee: Drew Fischer

=== Standings ===
==== Western Conference ====
Pos	Team	Pld	W	L	T	GF	GA	GD	Pts	PPG	Qualification
1	Sporting Kansas City	21	12	6	3	38	25	+13	39	1.86	MLS Cup First Round
2	Seattle Sounders FC	22	11	5	6	44	23	+21	39	1.77	MLS Cup First Round
3	Portland Timbers	23	11	6	6	46	35	+11	39	1.70	MLS Cup First Round
4	Minnesota United FC	21	9	5	7	36	26	+10	34	1.62	MLS Cup First Round
5	Colorado Rapids	18	8	6	4	32	28	+4	28	1.56	MLS Cup First Round

Source: MLS
Rules for classification: 1) points per game; 2) total wins per match played; 3) total goal differential per match played; 4) total goals scored per match played; 5) fewest disciplinary points per match played; 6) away goal differential per away match played; 7) away goals scored per away match played; 8) home goal differential per home match played; 9) home goals scored per home match played; 10) coin toss or drawing of lots.

==== Overall table ====
2020 MLS overall standings
Pos	Team	Pld	W	L	T	GF	GA	GD	Pts	PPG	Qualification
1	Philadelphia Union (S)	23	14	4	5	44	20	+24	47	2.04	CONCACAF Champions League
2	Toronto FC	23	13	5	5	33	26	+7	44	1.91	CONCACAF Champions League
3	Sporting Kansas City	21	12	6	3	38	25	+13	39	1.86	Leagues Cup
4	Columbus Crew SC (C)	23	12	6	5	36	21	+15	41	1.78	CONCACAF Champions League
5	Orlando City SC	23	11	4	8	40	25	+15	41	1.78	Leagues Cup

Source: MLS
Rules for classification: 1) points per game; 2) total wins per match played; 3) total goal differential per match played; 4) total goals scored per match played; 5) fewest disciplinary points per match played; 6) away goal differential per away match played; 7) away goals scored per away match played; 8) home goal differential per home match played; 9) home goals scored per home match played; 10) coin toss or drawing of lots.
(C) MLS Cup champion; (S) Supporters' Shield winners

=== Results by round ===
Round	1	2	3	4	5	6	7	8	9	10	11	12	13	14	15	16	17	18	19	20	21	22	23	24	25	26	27	28	29	30	31	32	33	34
Stadium	A	H	A	A	H	A	A	H	H	A	H	A	H	A	H	A	H	H	H	A	H	H	A	H	A	A	H	A	H	A	A	H	A	H
Result	W	W	L	W	W	W	L	D	D	L	W	L	L																					

A = Away; H = Home; W = Win; D = Draw; L = Loss

== Player statistics ==
=== Squad appearances and goals ===
Last updated on September 23, 2020.

No.	Pos	Nat	Player	Total		Major League Soccer		MLS is Back		Playoffs	
No.	Pos	Nat	Player	Apps	Goals	Apps	Goals	Apps	Goals	Apps	Goals
Goalkeepers
1	GK	(Mexico) MEX	Richard Sánchez	0	0	0	0	0	0	0	0
45	GK	(United States) USA	John Pulskamp	0	0	0	0	0	0	0	0
29	GK	(United States) USA	Tim Melia	6	0	6	0	0	0	0	0
Defenders
3	DF	(Spain) ESP	Andreu Fontas	0	0	0	0	0	0	0	0
4	DF	(Croatia) CRO	Roberto Punčec	6	0	4+2	0	0	0	0	0
5	DF	(United States) USA	Matt Besler	5	0	4+1	0	0	0	0	0
8	DF	(United States) USA	Graham Zusi	7	0	6+1	0	0	0	0	0
13	DF	(United States) USA	Amadou Dia	1	0	1	0	0	0	0	0
16	DF	(United States) USA	Graham Smith	3	0	3	0	0	0	0	0
22	DF	(New Zealand) NZL	Winston Reid	3	0	3	0	0	0	0	0
26	DF	(United States) USA	Jaylin Lindsey	5	0	5	0	0	0	0	0
36	DF	(Portugal) POR	Luís Martins	3	0	3	0	0	0	0	0
Midfielders
6	MF	(Spain) ESP	Ilie	2	0	2	0	0	0	0	0
10	MF	(Chile) CHI	Felipe Gutiérrez	0	0	0	0	0	0	0	0
15	MF	(Honduras) HON	Roger Espinoza	5	1	5	1	0	0	0	0
17	MF	(Israel) ISR	Gadi Kinda	6	4	6	4	0	0	0	0
21	MF	(Colombia) COL	Felipe Hernandez	5	0	2+3	0	0	0	0	0
27	MF	(United States) USA	Gianluca Busio	7	1	5+2	1	0	0	0	0
28	MF	(United States) USA	Cameron Duke	2	0	1+1	0	0	0	0	0
75	MF	(Malaysia) MAS	Wan Kuzain Wan Kamal	0	0	0	0	0	0	0	0
Forwards
7	FW	(Scotland) SCO	Johnny Russell	6	1	5+1	1	0	0	0	0
9	FW	(Mexico) MEX	Alan Pulido	5	2	5	2	0	0	0	0
11	FW	(United States) USA	Khiry Shelton	7	2	6+1	2	0	0	0	0
12	FW	(Guinea-Bissau) GNB	Gerso	6	0	3+3	0	0	0	0	0
19	FW	(United States) USA	Erik Hurtado	5	2	1+4	2	0	0	0	0
20	FW	(Hungary) HUN	Dániel Sallói	2	0	0+2	0	0	0	0	0
23	FW	(United States) USA	Tyler Freeman	0	0	0	0	0	0	0	0
Players who have made an appearance or had a squad number this season but have left the club

0+1 means player did came on as a sub once. 1+1 means player started once and came on as a sub once.
The group stage matches of the MLS is Back Tournament count as regular season matches and data will be listed under Regular Season.

=== Top scorers ===
Number	Position	Name	MLS	MLS is Back	Open Cup	Playoffs	Total
7	FW	(Scotland) Johnny Russell	6	0	0	0	6
17	MF	(Israel) Gadi Kinda	4	0	0	0	4
11	FW	(United States) Khiry Shelton	4	0	0	0	4
9	FW	(Mexico) Alan Pulido	3	1	0	0	4
19	FW	(United States) Erik Hurtado	2	0	0	0	2
15	MF	(Honduras) Roger Espinoza	1	0	0	0	1
8	DF	(United States) Graham Zusi	1	0	0	0	1
12	FW	(Guinea-Bissau) Gerso	1	0	0	0	1
27	MF	(United States) Gianluca Busio	1	0	0	0	1
N/A	N/A	Own Goal	1	0	0	0	1
Total			23	1	0	0	24

As of September 23, 2020

=== Disciplinary record ===
Number	Position	Name	MLS			MLS is Back			Playoffs			Total		
Number	Position	Name	Booked	(yellow card) (yellow-red card)	Sent off (straight red)	Booked	(yellow card) (yellow-red card)	Sent off (straight red)	Booked	(yellow card) (yellow-red card)	Sent off (straight red)	Booked	(yellow card) (yellow-red card)	Sent off (straight red)
17	MF	(Israel) Gadi Kinda	3	1	0	0	0	0	0	0	0	3	1	0
6	MF	(Spain) Ilie	1	0	0	0	0	0	0	0	0	1	0	0
11	FW	(United States) Khiry Shelton	1	0	0	0	0	0	0	0	0	0	0	0
15	MF	(Honduras) Roger Espinoza	0	0	0	0	0	0	0	0	0	0	0	0
9	FW	(Mexico) Alan Pulido	1	0	0	0	0	0	0	0	0	1	0	0
27	MF	(United States) Gianluca Busio	2	0	0	0	0	0	0	0	0	2	0	0
16	DF	(United States) Graham Smith	1	0	0	0	0	0	0	0	0	1	0	0
12	FW	(Guinea-Bissau) Gerso	0	0	0	1	0	0	0	0	0	0	0	0
28	MF	(United States) Cameron Duke	1	0	0	0	0	0	0	0	0	1	0	0
4	DF	(Croatia) Roberto Punčec	0	0	0	0	0	0	0	0	0	0	0	0
7	FW	(Scotland) Johnny Russell	0	0	0	0	0	0	0	0	0	0	0	0
29	GK	(United States) Tim Melia	0	0	0	0	0	0	0	0	0	0	0	0
5	DF	(United States) Matt Besler	0	0	0	0	0	0	0	0	0	0	0	0
TOTALS			2	0	0	0	0	0	0	0	0	2	0	0

As of March 1, 2021

=== Injury record ===
N	P	Nat.	Name	Type	Status	Source	Match	Inj. Date	Ret. Date
7	FW	(Scotland)	Johnny Russell	Muscle Tear		thebluetestament.com	Unknown	November 2019	February 29, 2020
10	MF	(Chile)	Felipe Gutiérrez	knee injury		mlssoccer.com	Unknown	February 2020	
3	DF	(Spain)	Andreu Fontas	Achilles surgery		mlssoccer.com	Unknown	February 2020	

- Player is injured
- Player has recovered from injury
Last updated: March 2, 2020
Source: SportingKC.com
