= 2017 U.S. Open Cup final =

2017 final of the Lamar Hunt U.S. Open Cup

- Event: 2017 U.S. Open Cup
Sporting Kansas City	New York Red Bulls
MLS	MLS
2	1
- Date: September 20, 2017
- Venue: Children's Mercy Park, Kansas City, Kansas, U.S.
- Referee: Hilario Grajeda
- Attendance: 21,523
- Weather: 78 °F (26 °C) and partly cloudy

The 2017 Lamar Hunt U.S. Open Cup final was played on September 20, 2017, at Children's Mercy Park in Kansas City, Kansas. The match determined the winner of the 2017 U.S. Open Cup, a tournament open to amateur and professional soccer teams affiliated with the United States Soccer Federation. It was the 104th edition of the oldest competition in United States soccer. This edition of the final was contested between Sporting Kansas City and the New York Red Bulls, both of Major League Soccer.

Kansas City and New York both play in the top tier of American soccer, Major League Soccer (MLS), and bypassed the initial stages of the tournament, with direct entry into the fourth round of play. Kansas City secured its berth in the final by defeating four other MLS teams; Minnesota United FC, Houston Dynamo, FC Dallas, and San Jose Earthquakes. New York's road to the final involved victories over three MLS teams and one USL team; New York City FC, Philadelphia Union, New England Revolution and FC Cincinnati.

Kansas City won their fourth title following a 2–1 win thanks to goals from Latif Blessing and Dániel Sallói. As winners, Kansas City qualified for the 2019 CONCACAF Champions League.

The match was broadcast in English on ESPN2 and in Spanish on ESPN Deportes, making it the third straight time the cup final was aired on one of the ESPN networks.

== Road to the final ==
The U.S. Open Cup is an annual American soccer competition open to all United States Soccer Federation affiliated teams, from amateur adult club teams to the professional clubs of Major League Soccer (MLS). The 2017 competition was the 104th edition of the oldest soccer tournament in the United States.

=== Sporting Kansas City ===
Sporting Kansas City had previously won the U.S. Open Cup in 2004, 2012, and the 2015, and to date, are the only Kansan club to have ever won the honor. To reach the final, Kansas City hosted three of their four cup fixture heading to the final.

=== New York Red Bulls ===
The Red Bulls had only been to one previous Open Cup Final, the 2003 Lamar Hunt U.S. Open Cup Final, which the then-MetroStars lost to the Chicago Fire 0-1 at Giants Stadium. Two other teams from New Jersey, Elizabeth S.C. and Paterson F.C., have won the Open Cup, with Paterson F.C. winning the then-Challenge Cup in 1923 on a forfeit, and Elizabeth S.C. winning the Challenge Cup in 1970 and 1972.

== Match ==
=== Details ===
September 20, 2017
19:30 CDT

Sporting Kansas City	2–1	New York Red Bulls
Blessing 25'; Sallói 66'	Report	Wright-Phillips 90+1'

Children's Mercy Park, Kansas City, Kansas
Attendance: 21,523
Referee: Hilario Grajeda (United States)

Sporting Kansas City	New York Red Bulls

GK	29	(United States) Tim Melia
RB	8	(United States) Graham Zusi
CB	3	(United States) Ike Opara	(yellow card) 90+6'
CB	5	(United States) Matt Besler
LB	15	(United States) Seth Sinovic	(yellow card) 4'
CM	27	(Honduras) Roger Espinoza
CM	6	(Spain) Ilie Sánchez
CM	10	(United States) Benny Feilhaber
RF	7	(Guinea-Bissau) Gerso Fernandes		(substituted off) 56'
CF	11	(Chile) Diego Rubio		(substituted off) 82'
LF	9	(Ghana) Latif Blessing		(substituted off) 43'
Substitutes:
GK	1	(United States) Adrian Zendejas
DF	2	(United States) Erik Palmer-Brown
DF	17	(United States) Saad Abdul-Salaam
MF	19	(Spain) Cristian Lobato
FW	30	(Hungary) Dániel Sallói		(substituted on) 43'
FW	88	(Cape Verde) Kévin Oliveira		(substituted on) 82'
FW	94	(Colombia) Jimmy Medranda		(substituted on) 56'
Manager:
(United States) Peter Vermes

GK	18	(United States) Ryan Meara
CB	62	(Panama) Michael Amir Murillo
CB	33	(United States) Aaron Long	(yellow card) 27'
CB	29	(Panama) Fidel Escobar
DM	8	(Brazil) Felipe
CM	19	(United States) Alex Muyl		(substituted off) 71'
CM	92	(Jamaica) Kemar Lawrence		(substituted off) 66'
AM	4	(United States) Tyler Adams	(yellow card) 57'
RF	27	(United States) Sean Davis		(substituted off) 77'
CF	99	(England) Bradley Wright-Phillips
LF	16	(United States) Sacha Kljestan
Substitutes:
GK	31	(United States) Luis Robles
DF	5	(United States) Connor Lade
MF	6	(United States) Dan Metzger
MF	7	(Haiti) Derrick Etienne
MF	15	(United States) Sal Zizzo		(substituted on) 66'
MF	30	(Argentina) Gonzalo Verón		(substituted on) 71'
FW	10	(Norway) Muhamed Keita		(substituted on) 77'
Manager:
(United States) Jesse Marsch

Assistant referees:
Jason White
Andrew Bigelow
Fourth official:
Ismail Elfath

Match rules

- 90 minutes.
- 30 minutes of extra time if necessary.
- Penalty shoot-out if scores still level.
- Seven named substitutes, of which up to three may be used.
