= Ilie Sánchez =

Spanish footballer (born 1990)

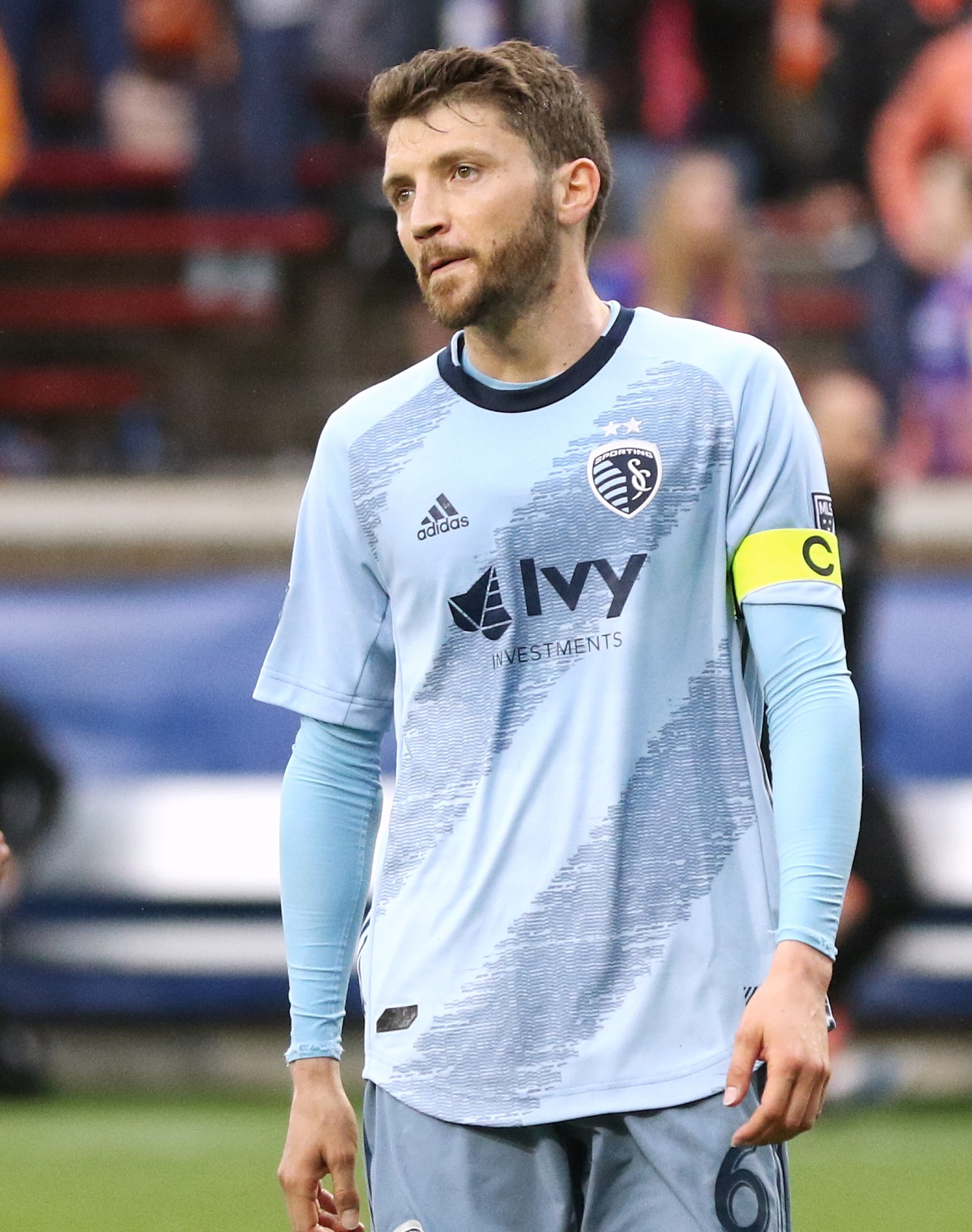
- Sánchez with Sporting Kansas City in 2019

Personal information
- Full name: Ilie Sánchez Farrés
- Date of birth: 21 November 1990 (age 35)
- Place of birth: Barcelona, Spain
- Height: 1.83 m (6 ft 0 in)
- Position: Defensive midfielder

Team information
- Current team: Austin FC
- Number: 6

Youth career
- 1996–1998: Martinenc
- 1998–2000: Barcelona
- 2000–2001: Poble Sec
- 2001–2003: Catalònia
- 2003–2005: Collblanc
- 2005–2007: Cornellà
- 2007–2009: Barcelona

Senior career*
Years	Team	Apps	(Gls)
2009–2014	Barcelona B	114	(2)
2014–2016	1860 Munich	24	(1)
2015–2016	→ Elche (loan)	27	(1)
2017–2021	Sporting Kansas City	144	(7)
2022–2024	Los Angeles FC	71	(2)
2025–	Austin FC	54	(2)

International career^{‡}
2025–	Catalonia	1	(1)

Managerial career
- 2021: Sporting Kansas City (academy)
- * Club domestic league appearances and goals as of 21:25, 8 November 2026 (UTC) ‡ National team caps and goals as of 23:06, 25 October 2026 (UTC)

Ilie Sánchez Farrés (Catalan: [ˈiliə], Spanish: [ˈilje]; born 21 November 1990) is a Spanish professional footballer who plays as a defensive midfielder for Major League Soccer club Austin FC, where he is captain.

Developed at Barcelona, where he was only a reserve, he spent most of his career in Major League Soccer, making over 240 appearances for Sporting Kansas City, Los Angeles FC and Austin FC. He won the U.S. Open Cup with the first of those clubs in 2017 and the Supporters' Shield and MLS Cup with the second in 2022.

== Club career ==
=== Barcelona B ===
Born in Barcelona, Catalonia, Sánchez represented several clubs as a youth, including FC Barcelona from ages 7 to 9, returning to La Masia in 2007. In the 2009–10 season he made his professional debut in the Segunda División B, contributing 22 matches (one goal) as the B team returned to Segunda División after an 11-year absence.

Mainly a defensive midfielder, Sánchez was reconverted into a right-back by manager Luis Enrique, a former Barcelona player. He was also called by Pep Guardiola for the first team's pre-season in 2010.

=== 1860 Munich ===
On 11 June 2014, both Sánchez and teammate Edu Bedia signed for TSV 1860 Munich of the German 2. Bundesliga. He made his league debut in the season opener, a 3–2 away defeat to 1. FC Kaiserslautern, and scored his only goal on 26 September to help to a 2–0 home win against SpVgg Greuther Fürth.

Sánchez was deemed surplus to requirements by manager Torsten Fröhling at the start of the 2015–16 campaign, and on 31 August he was loaned to Elche CF in the Spanish second tier. He scored once, the penalty winner in a 2–1 home victory over CA Osasuna on 8 November. Shortly after his return to his parent club, his contract was mutually annulled.

=== Sporting Kansas City ===
On 13 January 2017, Sánchez moved to Major League Soccer side Sporting Kansas City on a two-year deal. He played on 20 September as the team won the U.S. Open Cup with a 2–1 final victory over the New York Red Bulls; days later, he earned a U.S. green card which qualified him as a domestic player for MLS roster purposes.

Sánchez was named to the All-Star team at the end of the 2018 season in recognition of his play, notably ranking in the top five in nearly every passing and midfield statistic or metric. In 2019, he figured in Kansas City's run to the CONCACAF Champions League semi-finals, scoring in knockout games against Deportivo Toluca F.C. and C.A. Independiente de La Chorrera. On 29 September that year, he was sent off while conceding a late penalty from which the Portland Timbers drew 2–2 at Children's Mercy Park.

In August 2021, Sánchez took an assistant coaching role with the under-14 side as part of his B License course in the U.S. Soccer Coaching Education program. Following the year's campaign, his contract option was declined.

=== Los Angeles FC ===
On 12 January 2022, Sánchez signed a two-year contract with Los Angeles FC. He scored his first goal on 2 April in a 4–2 win at Orlando City SC, the only one of a season in which his team won the Supporters' Shield; he missed just one game, as a result of a red card in a 2–1 loss at the San Jose Earthquakes on 20 August. On 5 November, he scored the decisive goal of the penalty shootout win over the Philadelphia Union to secure the team's first MLS Cup.

=== Austin FC ===
On 31 December 2024, Sánchez remained in the MLS by joining Austin FC on an initial one-year deal.

== International career ==
Sánchez made his debut for the Catalonia regional team on 18 November 2025, opening an eventual 2–1 friendly win over Palestine.

== Personal life ==
Sánchez's older brother Yuri was on the youth ranks of UE Cornellà at the same time as him, as an attacking midfielder. Having failed to join him as a fellow professional, he became an economist after graduating from the University of Barcelona.

In 2023, Sánchez was naturalized as a United States citizen. His grandfather, Joan César, was in charge of Barcelona's academy from 1987 to 2000.

== Career statistics ==
As of match played 7 November 2026

Appearances and goals by club, season and competition
Club	Season	League			National cup (Note: Includes DFB-Pokal, Copa del Rey and U.S. Open Cup)		Continental		Other		Total	
Club	Season	Division	Apps	Goals	Apps	Goals	Apps	Goals	Apps	Goals	Apps	Goals
Barcelona B	2009–10	Segunda División B	17	1	—		—		5 (Note: Appearances in Segunda División B play-offs)	0	22	1
Barcelona B	2010–11	Segunda División	24	1	—		—		—		24	1
Barcelona B	2011–12	Segunda División	1	0	—		—		—		1	0
Barcelona B	2012–13	Segunda División	29	0	—		—		—		29	0
Barcelona B	2013–14	Segunda División	38	0	—		—		—		38	0
Barcelona B	Total		109	2	—		—		5	0	114	2
1860 Munich	2014–15	2. Bundesliga	24	1	2	0	—		—		26	1
Elche (loan)	2015–16	Segunda División	27	1	1	0	—		—		28	1
Sporting Kansas City	2017	Major League Soccer	33	0	5	0	—		1 (Note: Appearances in MLS Cup playoffs)	0	39	0
Sporting Kansas City	2018	Major League Soccer	34	4	3	0	—		4	1	41	5
Sporting Kansas City	2019	Major League Soccer	32	2	1	0	6 (Note: Appearances in CONCACAF Champions League)	2	—		39	4
Sporting Kansas City	2020	Major League Soccer	15	0	—		—		2	1	17	1
Sporting Kansas City	2021	Major League Soccer	30	1	—		—		3 (Note: Two appearances in MLS Cup playoffs, appearance in Leagues Cup)	0	33	1
Sporting Kansas City	Total		144	7	9	0	6	2	10	2	169	11
Los Angeles FC	2022	Major League Soccer	33	1	2	0	—		3	0	38	1
Los Angeles FC	2023	Major League Soccer	34	1	—		8	0	8 (Note: Three appearances in Leagues Cup, five appearances in MLS Cup playoffs)	0	50	1
Los Angeles FC	2024	Major League Soccer	4	0	—		—		—		4	0
Los Angeles FC	Total		71	2	2	0	8	0	11	0	92	2
Austin FC	2025	Major League Soccer	26	1	5	1	—		2	0	33	2
Austin FC	2026	Major League Soccer	28	1	0	0	—		4 (Note: Includes appearance in Leagues Cup)	0	32	1
Austin FC	Total		54	2	5	1	0	0	6	0	65	3
Career total			429	15	19	1	14	2	32	2	494	20

== Honours ==
Sporting Kansas City

- U.S. Open Cup: 2017

Los Angeles FC

- MLS Cup: 2022
- Supporters' Shield: 2022
- U.S. Open Cup: 2024

Individual

- MLS All-Star Game: 2018, 2022
