= Saad Abdul-Salaam =

American soccer player (born 1991)

Personal information
- Date of birth: September 8, 1991 (age 35)
- Place of birth: Charlotte, North Carolina, U.S.
- Height: 1.93 m (6 ft 4 in)
- Position: Defender

Youth career
- Internationals SC

College career
| Years | Team | Apps | (Gls) |
| 2012–2014 | Akron Zips | 54 | (3) |

Senior career*
| Years | Team | Apps | (Gls) |
| 2013 | Portland Timbers U23s | 6 | (1) |
| 2015–2017 | Sporting Kansas City | 64 | (1) |
| 2015 | → San Antonio Scorpions (loan) | 5 | (0) |
| 2018 | New York City FC | 4 | (0) |
| 2018 | → Phoenix Rising (loan) | 9 | (0) |
| 2019 | Seattle Sounders FC | 18 | (0) |
| 2019 | → Tacoma Defiance (loan) | 1 | (0) |
| 2020 | FC Cincinnati | 8 | (0) |
| 2021 | Columbus Crew | 18 | (0) |
| 2022 | San Antonio FC | 11 | (1) |
| Total | | 144 | (3) |
- * Club domestic league appearances and goals as of October 21, 2022

Saad Abdul-Salaam (born September 8, 1991) is an American former professional soccer player who played as a defender. Abdul-Salaam later worked as an academy coach for the Columbus Crew.

== Career ==
=== Early career ===
Born in Charlotte, North Carolina, Abdul-Salaam grew up in Gahanna, Ohio where he played for the local high school side that won the state championship in 2009. Abdul-Salaam then went on to attend the University of Akron where he played for the Akron Zips.

=== Sporting Kansas City ===
After his four-years at Akron, Abdul-Salaam was drafted as the twelfth overall pick during the 2015 MLS SuperDraft by Sporting Kansas City. On May 19, 2015, Abdul-Salaam was recalled from his loan with the San Antonio Scorpions by Sporting Kansas City.

=== San Antonio Scorpions (loan) ===
On April 1, 2015, it was announced that Abdul-Salaam would be loaned out to the San Antonio Scorpions for the North American Soccer League spring season. He made his professional debut for the team on April 4 against the Tampa Bay Rowdies. He started the match and played the full 90 as San Antonio fell 3–1.

=== Returning to Kansas City ===
Abdul-Salaam made his MLS debut on May 20, 2015, as a stoppage-time substitute for Krisztián Németh in a 4–2 win against the New England Revolution. He finished the 2015 season with 22 appearances, ten of them starts, and one assist. In the playoffs, Sporting Kansas City's knockout-round match against the Portland Timbers went to a penalty shoot-out; Abdul-Salaam had a kick to win it, but his shot struck both posts and stayed out, and Portland won the shoot-out 7–6. In 2016, his sophomore season, he made 30 appearances, 26 of them starts, without scoring and recorded three assists. He scored his first MLS goal on June 3, 2017, in a 3–0 win against Minnesota United.

=== New York City ===
On December 14, 2017, it was announced that Abdul-Salaam was traded to New York City FC in exchange for Khiry Shelton. He was loaned to Phoenix Rising FC on August 13, 2018.

=== Seattle Sounders FC ===
On February 26, 2019, Abdul-Salaam's rights were traded to Seattle Sounders FC in exchange for $50,000 of Targeted Allocation Money. He was released by Seattle at the end of the 2019 season.

=== FC Cincinnati ===
On December 3, 2019, Abdul-Salaam was selected by FC Cincinnati in Stage Two of the 2019 MLS Re-Entry Process.

=== Columbus Crew ===
On April 17, 2021, Abdul-Salaam was selected off waivers by Columbus Crew, who had been waived a few days earlier by Cincinnati following their acquisition of Edgar Castillo. Following the 2021 season, Columbus opted to decline their contract option on Abdul-Salaam.

=== San Antonio FC ===
On June 22, 2022, San Antonio FC announced that they signed Abdul-Salaam for the remainder of the 2022 season.

== Career statistics ==
As of March 5, 2022

| Club | Season | League | | | Domestic Cup | | International (Note: Appearance(s) in CONCACAF Champions League) | | Other | | Total | |
| Club | Season | Division | Apps | Goals | Apps | Goals | Apps | Goals | Apps | Goals | Apps | Goals |
|---|---|---|---|---|---|---|---|---|---|---|---|---|
| Sporting Kansas City | 2015 | MLS | 22 | 0 | 5 | 0 | — | | 1 (Note: Appearance(s) in MLS Cup Playoffs) | 0 | 28 | 0 |
| Sporting Kansas City | 2016 | MLS | 30 | 0 | 1 | 0 | 2 | 0 | 1 | 0 | 34 | 0 |
| Sporting Kansas City | 2017 | MLS | 12 | 1 | 3 | 0 | — | | 1 | 0 | 16 | 1 |
| Sporting Kansas City | Total | | 64 | 1 | 9 | 0 | 2 | 0 | 3 | 0 | 78 | 1 |
| San Antonio Scorpions (loan) | 2015 | NASL | 5 | 0 | 0 | 0 | — | | — | | 5 | 0 |
| New York City | 2018 | MLS | 4 | 0 | 1 | 0 | — | | 0 | 0 | 5 | 0 |
| Phoenix Rising (loan) | 2018 | USL | 13 | 0 | 0 | 0 | — | | — | | 13 | 0 |
| Seattle Sounders FC | 2019 | MLS | 18 | 0 | 1 | 0 | — | | 0 | 0 | 20 | 0 |
| Tacoma Defiance (loan) | 2019 | USL | 3 | 0 | — | | — | | — | | 3 | 0 |
| FC Cincinnati | 2020 | MLS | 8 | 0 | — | | — | | — | | 8 | 0 |
| Columbus Crew | 2021 | MLS | 18 | 0 | — | | 1 | 0 | — | | 19 | 0 |
| Career total | | | 115 | 1 | 11 | 0 | 3 | 0 | 3 | 0 | 132 | 1 |

== Honors ==
Seattle Sounders FC

- MLS Cup: 2019

Columbus Crew

- Campeones Cup: 2021

=== San Antonio FC ===
- USL Championship (regular season): 2022
- USL Championship Final: 2022
