= Erik Hurtado =

American soccer player

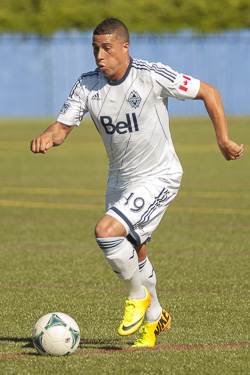
- Hurtado playing with the Vancouver Whitecaps FC

Personal information
- Full name: Erik Hurtado
- Date of birth: November 15, 1990 (age 36)
- Place of birth: Fredericksburg, Virginia, United States
- Height: 5 ft 10 in (1.78 m)
- Position: Forward

Youth career
- 2007–2009: Westside Metros

College career
Years	Team	Apps	(Gls)
2009–2012	Santa Clara Broncos	77	(33)

Senior career*
Years	Team	Apps	(Gls)
2011–2012	Portland Timbers U23s	18	(14)
2013–2018	Vancouver Whitecaps FC	105	(12)
2015	→ Whitecaps FC 2 (loan)	2	(0)
2015	→ Mjøndalen (loan)	11	(1)
2016	→ Whitecaps FC 2 (loan)	2	(0)
2019–2020	Sporting Kansas City	28	(7)
2019	→ Swope Park Rangers (loan)	1	(0)
2021	CF Montréal	7	(0)
2021–2022	Columbus Crew	24	(3)
2022	→ Columbus Crew 2 (loan)	1	(1)
2023	San Antonio FC	2	(0)
2023	D.C. United	7	(0)

International career
2008	United States U18	3	(0)
- * Club domestic league appearances and goals as of 02:58, January 6, 2024 (UTC)

Erik Hurtado (born November 15, 1990) is an American professional soccer player who plays as a forward.

Hurtado played college soccer for the Santa Clara Broncos and was named the West Coast Conference Player of the Year as a senior. The Vancouver Whitecaps FC selected him fifth overall in the 2013 MLS SuperDraft. He played in Major League Soccer (MLS) for Vancouver, Sporting Kansas City, CF Montréal and the Columbus Crew, with whom he won the 2021 Campeones Cup, and spent part of 2015 on loan at Norwegian club Mjøndalen. In 2023, he joined San Antonio FC of the USL Championship.

== Club career ==
Born in Fredericksburg, Virginia, Hurtado moved with his mother to her hometown of Gresham, Oregon when he was six. He began playing club soccer in nearby Beaverton before moving with his family to Cuernavaca in Mexico. During his time in Mexico, Hurtado was invited to train with the youth academy at Liga MX side UNAM. He soon moved back to Beaverton and continued playing for his club side. During high-school, Hurtado played for both his high school team, the Westview Wildcats, and club side, Westside Metros.

In 2009, Hurtado moved to California and enrolled at Santa Clara University and played college soccer for the Santa Clara Broncos. He played four seasons for the Broncos, being named as the West Coast Conference Player of the Year in his senior year. He scored a total of 33 goals during his time with the Broncos.

While playing for the Santa Clara Broncos, Hurtado would spend the summer months playing for the Portland Timbers U23s of the Premier Development League. During the 2011 season, Hurtado was joint top scorer in the team with 8 goals. He returned to the Timbers U23s for the 2012 season.

=== Vancouver Whitecaps FC ===
After his senior year at Santa Clara, Hurtado attended the MLS Combine. He was rated as the seventh best forward option in the 2013 MLS SuperDraft and projected to be drafted late in the first round or early second round. On January 17, 2013, Hurtado was selected with the 5th overall pick by the Vancouver Whitecaps FC. He made his professional debut for the club on March 2, 2013, against Toronto FC. He came on as a 76th-minute substitute for Daigo Kobayashi as Vancouver won 1–0. Hurtado ended his first professional season with no goals from 15 appearances, four being starts.

Hurtado scored his first professional goal for the Whitecaps on May 10, 2014, against the Columbus Crew. His 37th-minute goal was the only one in a 1–0 victory. That goal was the first in a run of five matches in a row in which Hurtado managed to find the back of the net. He scored on May 14 against Toronto FC in the Canadian Championship before finding the net against the Seattle Sounders FC on May 24. He then scored in a 4–3 victory over his hometown Portland Timbers on June 1 before finishing his scoring run against the Philadelphia Union on June 7 in a 3–3 draw.

Hurtado then ended the 2014 season with one goal each in two matches against FC Dallas on September 13 and October 29.

On August 7, 2015, Hurtado was loaned out to Norwegian Tippeligaen side Mjøndalen for the rest of the 2015 season. He made his debut for the club on August 13 in the Norwegian Cup against Rosenborg. The next season, he returned to Vancouver having scored two goals in 24 matches.

=== Sporting Kansas City ===
On December 14, 2018, Hurtado was traded to Sporting Kansas City in exchange for their second-round pick in the 2020 MLS SuperDraft and their first-round pick in the 2021 MLS SuperDraft. He made his debut for Kansas City on February 21, 2019, in the CONCACAF Champions League against Toluca. He came on as an 82nd-minute substitute for Krisztián Németh as Sporting won 3–0. He scored his first goal for the club on August 4 against the Seattle Sounders FC. His 58th-minute goal was the third in a 3–2 victory.

On December 9, 2020, Hurtado was released by Sporting Kansas City following the 2020 season but was reported to be in discussions with the club regarding his future. On February 15, 2021, Hurtado announced that he had left the club.

=== CF Montréal ===
On February 16, 2021, Hurtado joined CF Montréal on a one-year deal, with an option for another. He made his debut on April 14 against Toronto FC, coming on as a substitute in the 4–2 victory.

=== Columbus Crew ===
On July 8, 2021, Hurtado was traded to the Columbus Crew in exchange for $200,000 in General Allocation Money. According to CF Montréal sporting director, Olivier Renard, the trade had to be made since Hurtado was not vaccinated against COVID-19 and thus would not be allowed to enter Canada when the rest of the team were allowed to return. Hurtado made his Crew debut the next day in a 2–2 away draw against FC Cincinnati. Following the 2021 season, Columbus declined their contract option on Hurtado. However, Hurtado and Columbus came to terms on a new deal on February 3, 2022.

Hurtado scored his first goal for the club on May 7, 2022, in a 2–2 tie with the New England Revolution.

=== San Antonio FC ===
On April 12, 2023, Hurtado joined USL Championship side San Antonio FC on a 25-day contract.

== Career statistics ==
=== Club ===
As of April 21, 2021

Appearances and goals by club, season and competition
Club	Season	League			Playoffs		Cup		Continental		Total	
Club	Season	Division	Apps	Goals	Apps	Goals	Apps	Goals	Apps	Goals	Apps	Goals
Portland Timbers U23s	2011	USL PDL	11	8	—	—	—	—	—	—	11	8
Portland Timbers U23s	2012	USL PDL	7	6	—	—	—	—	—	—	7	6
Portland Timbers U23s	Total		18	14	—	—	—	—	—	—	18	14
Vancouver Whitecaps FC	2013	Major League Soccer	15	0	—	—	2	0	—	—	17	0
Vancouver Whitecaps FC	2014	Major League Soccer	30	5	—	—	2	1	—	—	32	6
Vancouver Whitecaps FC	2015	Major League Soccer	9	0	0	0	1	0	1	0	11	0
Vancouver Whitecaps FC	2016	Major League Soccer	24	2	—	—	4	0	4	2	32	4
Vancouver Whitecaps FC	2017	Major League Soccer	15	3	0	0	0	0	—	—	15	3
Vancouver Whitecaps FC	2018	Major League Soccer	12	2	—	—	3	1	—	—	15	3
Vancouver Whitecaps FC	Total		105	12	0	0	12	2	5	2	122	16
Whitecaps FC 2 (loan)	2015	United Soccer League	2	0	—	—	—	—	—	—	2	0
Mjøndalen (loan)	2015	Tippeligaen	11	1	—	—	1	0	—	—	12	1
Whitecaps FC 2 (loan)	2016	United Soccer League	2	0	—	—	—	—	—	—	2	0
Sporting Kansas City	2019	Major League Soccer	13	2	—	—	0	0	3	0	16	2
Sporting Kansas City	2020	Major League Soccer	15	5	2	0	—	—	—	—	17	5
Sporting Kansas City	Total		28	7	2	0	0	0	3	0	33	7
CF Montréal	2021	Major League Soccer	7	0	—	—	0	0	—	—	7	0
Columbus Crew	2021	Major League Soccer	7	0	—	—	0	0	—	—	7	0
Columbus Crew	2022	Major League Soccer	0	0	0	0	1	0	0	0	1	0
Columbus Crew 2 (loan)	2022	MLS Next Pro	1	1	0	0	—		—		1	1
Career total			176	34	2	0	13	2	8	2	199	38

== Honors ==
Columbus Crew

- Campeones Cup: 2021
