= Tim Melia =

American soccer player (born 1986)

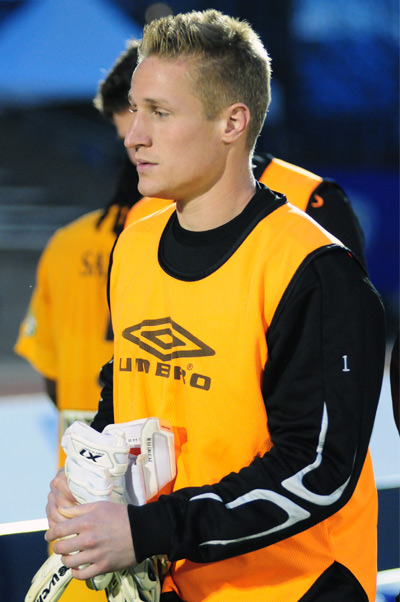
- Melia with Rochester Rhinos in 2009

Personal information
- Full name: Timothy Melia
- Date of birth: May 15, 1986 (age 40)
- Place of birth: Great River, New York, United States
- Height: 6 ft 1 in (1.85 m)
- Position: Goalkeeper

College career
Years	Team	Apps	(Gls)
2004–2005	Oneonta Red Dragons		
2006–2007	Lynn Fighting Knights		

Senior career*
Years	Team	Apps	(Gls)
2007	Long Island Rough Riders	7	(0)
2008–2009	Rochester Rhinos	13	(0)
2010–2011	Real Salt Lake	0	(0)
2010	→ Charleston Battery (loan)	16	(0)
2011	→ F.C. New York (loan)	4	(0)
2012–2014	Chivas USA	6	(0)
2014	MLS Pool	–	(–)
2014	→ Sporting Kansas City (loan)	0	(0)
2014	→ FC Dallas (loan)	0	(0)
2014	→ D.C. United (loan)	0	(0)
2015–2024	Sporting Kansas City	258	(0)
2016	→ Swope Park Rangers (loan)	1	(0)
- * Club domestic league appearances and goals as of November 14, 2024

Timothy Melia (/ˈmiːliə/; born May 15, 1986) is an American former professional soccer player. He spent the majority of his career as a goalkeeper for Major League Soccer club Sporting Kansas City.

== Early career ==
Melia was born in Great River, New York. Melia attended East Islip High School and played two years of college soccer at the State University of New York at Oneonta before transferring to Lynn University in 2006, where he played his junior and senior years.

Melia played for the Long Island Rough Riders in the USL Premier Development League in 2007.

== Professional career ==
=== Rochester Rhinos ===
Melia signed with the Rochester Rhinos of the USL First Division on April 30, 2008. An injury to veteran goalkeeper Scott Vallow resulted in increased playing time and a number of starts for Melia during the 2009 season, and he became known for his accurate long balls from goal kicks and dead-ball situations.

=== Real Salt Lake ===
After trialling with Real Salt Lake during their pre-season, Melia signed with the club on March 16, 2010; he was sent on loan to USL Division 2 side Charleston Battery in April. Following his clean sheet on June 29 in a U.S. Open Cup match against the Chicago Fire (Charleston won 3–0 on penalty kicks), Melia was named "Player of the 3rd Round" for the 2010 Lamar Hunt U.S. Open Cup. Melia was waived by Real Salt Lake on November 23, 2011.

=== Chivas USA ===
Melia signed with Chivas USA in January 2012 and joined them during the 2012 pre-season. During his time with Chivas, Melia made six league appearances for the club.

=== MLS Pool Goalkeeper ===
In the middle of the 2014 season, Melia was released by Chivas and became the league pool goalkeeper for Major League Soccer since he had a guaranteed contract. In August 2014, Sporting Kansas City called Melia up from the league pool after two of the team's three goalies, Eric Kronberg and Andy Gruenebaum, were injured. He was later called up by FC Dallas and D.C. United on an emergency basis, but he did not make any appearances.

=== Sporting KC ===
In December 2014, after having joined them in the previous season as an emergency pool goalkeeper, he signed with Sporting KC for the 2015 season.

After beginning the 2015 season as the understudy to starter Luis Marín, Melia emerged as the starter in May and was the primary goalkeeper for the remainder of the season. For his breakthrough efforts, Melia was named MLS Comeback Player of the Year.

Since earning the starting job, Melia has emerged as one of the top keepers in the league. He has led SKC to the U.S. Open Cup titles in both 2015, where SKC prevailed in a penalty shootout, and 2017, a hard-fought victory against the New York Red Bulls. Following a 2017 season where he allowed a record-low 0.78 goals per game, Melia was named MLS Goalkeeper of the Year, and also earned a spot on the MLS Best XI.

Melia's contract was not renewed ahead of the 2025 season, ending his 9-year long tenure with the club. On April 3, 2025, he announced his retirement from professional soccer.

== Career statistics ==
=== Club ===
As of match played 5 October 2024

Appearances and goals by club, season and competition
Club	Season	League			National cup		Continental		Other		Total	
Club	Season	Division	Apps	Goals	Apps	Goals	Apps	Goals	Apps	Goals	Apps	Goals
Rochester Rhinos	2009	USL First Division	13	0	2	0	—		—		15	0
Real Salt Lake	2010	MLS	0	0	—		—		—		0	0
Real Salt Lake	2011	MLS	0	0	0	0	—		0	0	0	0
Real Salt Lake	Total		0	0	0	0	—		0	0	0	0
Charleston Battery (loan)	2010	USL Second Division	16	0	3	0	—		—		19	0
F.C. New York (loan)	2011	USL Pro	4	0	0	0	—		—		4	0
Chivas USA	2012	MLS	2	0	3	0	—		—		5	0
Chivas USA	2013	MLS	2	0	0	0	—		—		2	0
Chivas USA	2014	MLS	2	0	0	0	—		—		2	0
Chivas USA	Total		6	0	3	0	—		—		9	0
Sporting Kansas City	2014	MLS	0	0	—		—		0	0	0	0
Sporting Kansas City	2015	MLS	23	0	5	0	—		1	0	29	0
Sporting Kansas City	2016	MLS	27	0	0	0	1	0	1	0	29	0
Sporting Kansas City	2017	MLS	31	0	5	0	—		0	0	36	0
Sporting Kansas City	2018	MLS	34	0	1	0	—		4	0	39	0
Sporting Kansas City	2019	MLS	32	0	0	0	5	0	—		37	0
Sporting Kansas City	2020	MLS	22	0	—		—		2	0	24	0
Sporting Kansas City	2021	MLS	28	0	—		—		2	0	30	0
Sporting Kansas City	2022	MLS	21	0	0	0	—		—		21	0
Sporting Kansas City	2023	MLS	16	0	0	0	—		4	0	20	0
Sporting Kansas City	2024	MLS	28	0	3	0	—		2	0	33	0
Sporting Kansas City	Total		262	0	14	0	6	0	16	0	298	0
Career total			301	0	22	0	6	0	16	0	345	0

== Honors ==
Charleston Battery

- USL Second Division Champions: 2010
- USL Second Division Regular Season Champions: 2010

Sporting Kansas City

- U.S. Open Cup: 2015, 2017

Individual

- MLS Comeback Player of the Year Award: 2015
- Man of the Match: 2015 U.S. Open Cup Finals
- Player of the tournament: 2017 U.S. Open Cup
- MLS Goalkeeper of the Year: 2017
- Sporting Kansas City Most Valuable Player: 2017
- MLS Best XI: 2017
