= Gerso Fernandes =

Guinea-Bissauan footballer (born 1991)

Gerso
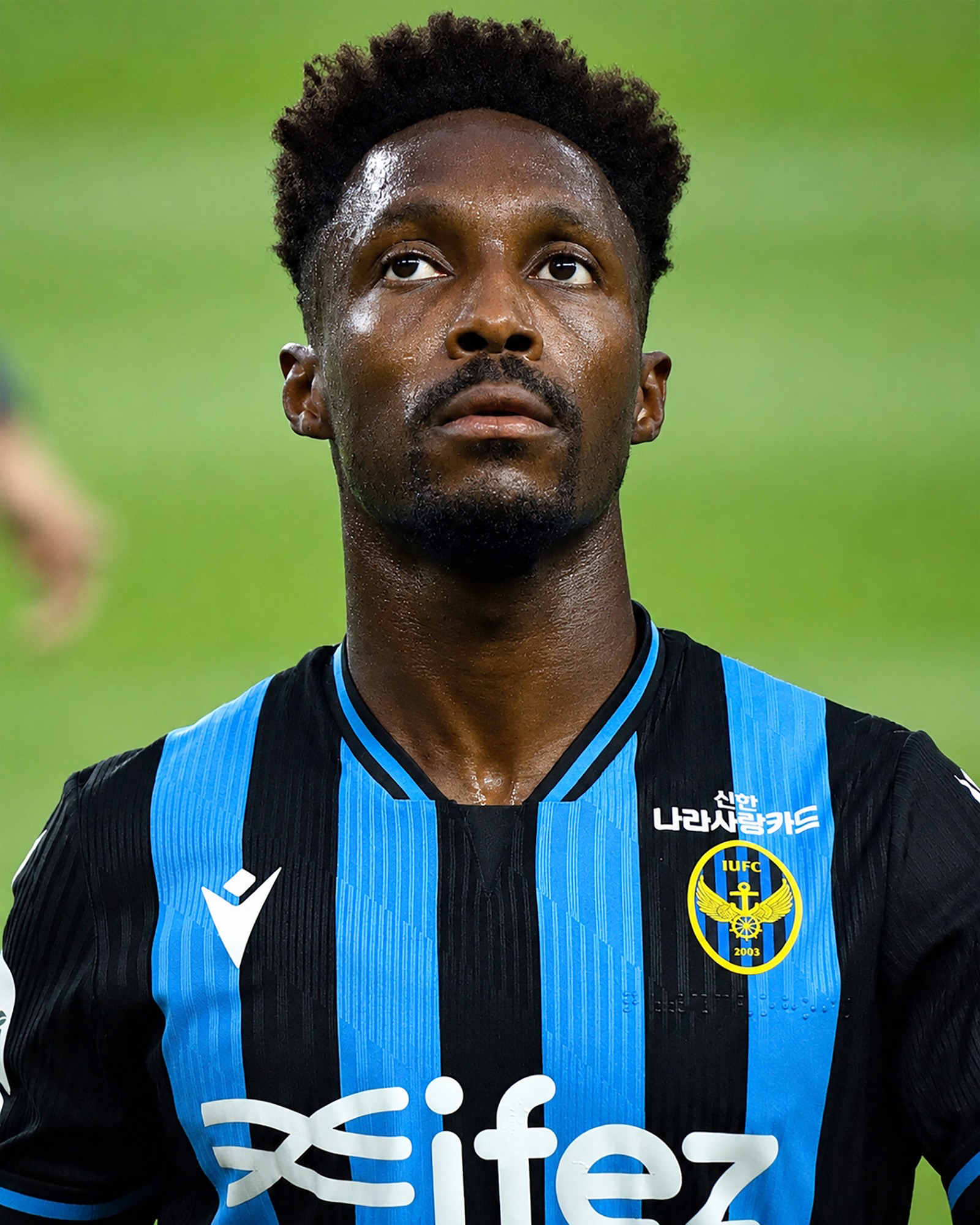
- Gerso with Incheon United in 2026

Personal information
- Full name: Gerso Fernandes
- Date of birth: 23 February 1991 (age 35)
- Place of birth: Bissau, Guinea-Bissau
- Height: 1.73 m (5 ft 8 in)
- Position: Winger

Team information
- Current team: Incheon United
- Number: 11

Youth career
- 2004–2009: União Coimbra
- 2009–2010: Académica

Senior career*
| Years | Team | Apps | (Gls) |
| 2010–2011 | Académica | 0 | (0) |
| 2010–2011 | → Tourizense (loan) | 25 | (3) |
| 2011–2016 | Estoril | 93 | (3) |
| 2014–2015 | → Moreirense (loan) | 25 | (5) |
| 2016–2017 | Belenenses | 14 | (1) |
| 2017–2020 | Sporting Kansas City | 107 | (18) |
| 2021–2022 | Jeju United | 69 | (13) |
| 2023– | Incheon United | 119 | (29) |
- * Club domestic league appearances and goals as of 3 August 2026

Gerso Fernandes (born 23 February 1991) is a Bissau-Guinean professional footballer who plays as a left winger for K League 1 club Incheon United.

== Club career ==
=== Portugal ===
Born in Bissau, Gerso moved to Portugal in his early teens, joining União de Coimbra's youth system in 2004 at age 13. As a junior, he signed with neighbouring Académica de Coimbra where he went on to complete his development; he did not play football for two years during his formative spell, after a priest from the charity facility where he was living advised him against the dangers of turning professional.

Gerso made his debut as a senior with Tourizense in the third division, who acted as Académica's farm team. Released in summer 2011, he moved to Estoril of Segunda Liga, contributing 20 scoreless appearances in his first season as the club returned to the Primeira Liga after seven years.

Gerso made his debut in Portugal's top flight on 17 August 2012, playing 30 minutes in a 2–1 away loss against Olhanense. He continued to be played almost exclusively as a substitute in the following campaigns by manager Marco Silva.

For 2014–15, Gerso was loaned to Moreirense of the same league. Ahead of the 2016–17 season, he agreed to a contract a fellow top-tier side Belenenses.

=== Sporting Kansas City ===
On 4 January 2017, Sporting Kansas City of Major League Soccer announced the signing of Gerso from Belenenses on a three-year designated player contract, with an option for a fourth year. On 17 May, he scored a hat-trick in a 3–0 win over Seattle Sounders FC at Children's Mercy Park.

Gerso helped the club to win the 2017 U.S. Open Cup. He rejected an offer for a new deal at the end of the 2020 campaign, and was released.

=== South Korea ===
On 16 February 2021, Gerso joined K League 1 club Jeju United. In 2022, he earned a ₩1.7 billion salary, becoming the highest-paid player in the competition.

Subsequently, Gerso signed for Incheon United in the same league on a free transfer. During the 2023 season, he displayed top-class speed while scoring ten goals and providing nine assists in all competitions to be his team's only player to be included in the K League Best XI.

Gerso suffered relegation at the end of 2024, also dealing with injury problems. Incheon were however crowned champions of the League 2 in the following campaign, and he was named Most Valuable Player in the process.

== Career statistics ==
As of match played 3 August 2026

| Club | Season | League | | | National cup (Note: Includes Taça de Portugal, U.S. Open Cup, Korea Cup) | | League cup (Note: Includes Taça da Liga) | | Continental | | Other | | Total | |
| Club | Season | Division | Apps | Goals | Apps | Goals | Apps | Goals | Apps | Goals | Apps | Goals | Apps | Goals |
|---|---|---|---|---|---|---|---|---|---|---|---|---|---|---|
| Estoril | 2011–12 | Liga de Honra | 21 | 0 | 3 | 0 | 2 | 0 | — | | — | | 26 | 0 |
| Estoril | 2012–13 | Primeira Liga | 26 | 0 | 0 | 0 | 3 | 0 | — | | — | | 29 | 0 |
| Estoril | 2013–14 | Primeira Liga | 16 | 1 | 2 | 1 | 3 | 0 | 5 (Note: Appearances in UEFA Europa League) | 0 | — | | 26 | 2 |
| Estoril | 2015–16 | Primeira Liga | 30 | 2 | 1 | 0 | 0 | 0 | — | | — | | 31 | 2 |
| Estoril | Total | | 93 | 3 | 6 | 1 | 8 | 0 | 5 | 0 | — | | 112 | 4 |
| Moreirense (loan) | 2014–15 | Primeira Liga | 25 | 5 | 2 | 0 | 4 | 1 | — | | — | | 31 | 6 |
| Belenenses | 2016–17 | Primeira Liga | 14 | 1 | 1 | 0 | 2 | 0 | — | | — | | 17 | 1 |
| Sporting Kansas City | 2017 | Major League Soccer | 32 | 8 | 5 | 2 | — | | — | | 1 (Note: Appearances in MLS Cup playoffs) | 0 | 38 | 10 |
| Sporting Kansas City | 2018 | Major League Soccer | 31 | 5 | 3 | 0 | — | | — | | 2 | 1 | 36 | 6 |
| Sporting Kansas City | 2019 | Major League Soccer | 25 | 2 | 1 | 1 | — | | 6 (Note: Appearances in CONCACAF Champions League) | 4 | — | | 32 | 7 |
| Sporting Kansas City | 2020 | Major League Soccer | 19 (Note: Includes three appearances in MLS is Back Tournament group stage) | 3 | — | | — | | — | | 4 (Note: Two appearances in MLS is Back Tournament knockout stage, two appearances in MLS Cup playoffs) | 0 | 23 | 3 |
| Sporting Kansas City | Total | | 107 | 18 | 9 | 3 | — | | 6 | 4 | 7 | 1 | 129 | 26 |
| Jeju United | 2021 | K League 1 | 32 | 5 | 1 | 0 | — | | — | | — | | 33 | 5 |
| Jeju United | 2022 | K League 1 | 37 | 8 | 2 | 0 | — | | — | | — | | 39 | 8 |
| Jeju United | Total | | 69 | 13 | 3 | 0 | — | | — | | — | | 72 | 13 |
| Incheon United | 2023 | K League 1 | 34 | 7 | 2 | 1 | — | | 5 (Note: Appearances in AFC Champions League) | 2 | — | | 41 | 10 |
| Incheon United | 2024 | K League 1 | 27 | 7 | 0 | 0 | — | | — | | — | | 27 | 7 |
| Incheon United | 2025 | K League 2 | 37 | 12 | 0 | 0 | — | | — | | — | | 37 | 12 |
| Incheon United | 2026 | K League 1 | 21 | 3 | 0 | 0 | — | | — | | — | | 21 | 3 |
| Incheon United | Total | | 119 | 29 | 2 | 1 | — | | 5 | 2 | — | | 126 | 32 |
| Career total | | | 417 | 67 | 23 | 5 | 14 | 1 | 16 | 6 | 7 | 1 | 473 | 82 |

== Honours ==
Estoril

- Liga de Honra: 2011–12

Sporting Kansas City

- U.S. Open Cup: 2017

Incheon United

- K League 2: 2025

Individual

- K League 1 Best XI: 2023
- K League 2 Most Valuable Player: 2025
- K League 2 Best XI: 2025
