= Gadi Kinda =

Israeli footballer (1994–2025)

Personal information
- Date of birth: 23 March 1994
- Place of birth: Addis Ababa, Ethiopia
- Date of death: 20 May 2025 (aged 31)
- Place of death: Tel Aviv, Israel
- Height: 1.73 m (5 ft 8 in)
- Position: Attacking midfielder

Youth career
- 2003–2014: Ashdod

Senior career*
Years	Team	Apps	(Gls)
2011–2019	Ashdod	160	(12)
2019–2021	Beitar Jerusalem	26	(8)
2020	→ Sporting Kansas City (loan)	20	(6)
2021–2023	Sporting Kansas City	46	(8)
2024–2025	Maccabi Haifa	45	(2)
Total		297	(36)

International career
2011–2012	Israel U18	5	(0)
2012	Israel U19	8	(2)
2013–2016	Israel U21	16	(1)
2021–2024	Israel	10	(2)
- * Club domestic league appearances and goals

Gadi Kinda (Hebrew: גדי קינדה; 23 March 1994 – 20 May 2025) was an Israeli professional footballer who played as an attacking midfielder. Born in Ethiopia, he played 10 caps with the Israel national team.

== Early life ==
Kinda was born in Addis Ababa, Ethiopia, to an Ethiopian-Jewish family. At the age of three, he immigrated to Israel with his family. At age 9, He joined football club Ashdod, which he made his professional debut in 2011, at age 17.

== Club career ==
From the age of 17, Kinda played for F.C. Ashdod in the Israeli Premier League and stayed with the club for eight years.

In February 2019, he moved to Beitar Jerusalem.

In January 2020, Kinda joined Major League Soccer club Sporting Kansas City on a one-year loan deal with an option to buy. He made his debut on 29 February, and scored in a 3–1 win away to the Vancouver Whitecaps. Following the 2020 season, Kinda was signed permanently by Sporting Kansas City.

Sporting Kansas City declared that Kinda would miss the entire 2022 season due to a procedure to rebuild his right knee cartilage. His spots as a senior player and international were vacated for another player to fill, and some of his financial value was deducted from the team's salary cap, but his spot as a designated player could not be transferred. Following the 2023 season, Kinda left Kansas City and returned to Israel to join Maccabi Haifa.

== International career ==
Kinda made his debut for the senior Israel national team on 5 June 2021 in a friendly match against Montenegro. He substituted Manor Solomon in the 73rd minute and scored on his debut in added time to establish a final score of 3–1 for Israel.

== Personal life and death ==
Kinda had a wife and two daughters. In May 2025, Maccabi Haifa announced that Kinda had been suffering from a complicated medical issue. On 20 May, he died from complications arising therefrom. Kinda was 31.

== Career statistics ==
No.	Date	Venue	Opponent	Score	Result	Competition
1.	5 June 2021	Podgorica City Stadium, Podgorica, Montenegro	Montenegro	3–1	3–1	Friendly
2.	21 November 2023	Estadi Nacional, Andorra la Vella, Andorra	Andorra	2–0	2–0	UEFA Euro 2024 qualifying

== Honours ==
Beitar Jerusalem

- Israeli Toto Cup: 2019–20
