= Seth Sinovic =

American soccer player (born 1987)

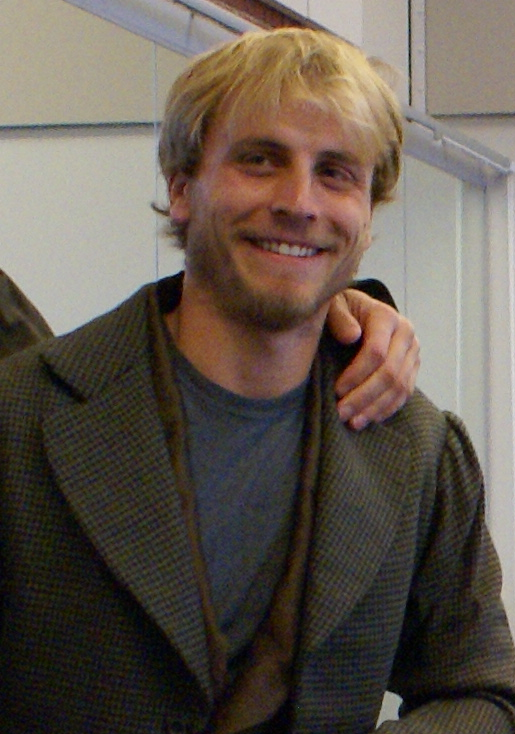

Personal information
- Full name: Seth Sinovic
- Date of birth: January 28, 1987 (age 39)
- Place of birth: Kansas City, Missouri, United States
- Height: 5 ft 10 in (1.78 m)
- Position: Defender

College career
Years	Team	Apps	(Gls)
2005–2009	Creighton Bluejays		

Senior career*
Years	Team	Apps	(Gls)
2009	Chicago Fire Premier	9	(0)
2010–2011	New England Revolution	20	(0)
2011–2019	Sporting Kansas City	210	(1)
2016	→ Swope Park Rangers (loan)	1	(0)
2018	→ Swope Park Rangers (loan)	1	(1)
2020	New England Revolution	1	(0)
Total		242	(2)
- * Club domestic league appearances and goals as of November 12, 2020

Seth Sinovic (/sɪˈnoʊvɪk/; born January 28, 1987) is an American former professional soccer player. He most recently played as a left back for the New England Revolution in Major League Soccer.

== Career ==
=== College and amateur ===
Sinovic grew up in Leawood, Kansas to parents of Croatian descent, and attended Rockhurst High School, and played college soccer at Creighton University from 2006 to 2009. During this time Sinovic earned such accolades as First-team all-Missouri Valley Conference, second-team NSCAA All-Midwest Region and second-team all-MVC honors.

During his college years Sinovic also played for Chicago Fire Premier in the USL Premier Development League, helping the team to the 2009 USL PDL championship game. He also interned for CMZ Trading, LLC, a financial firm specializing in options in Chicago, IL.

=== Professional ===
Sinovic was drafted in the second round (25th overall) of the 2010 MLS SuperDraft by New England Revolution.

He made his professional debut on March 27, 2010, in New England's opening game of the 2010 MLS season against Los Angeles Galaxy. He was waived by New England on March 31, 2011, having appeared in 20 league games for the Revs during his rookie season.

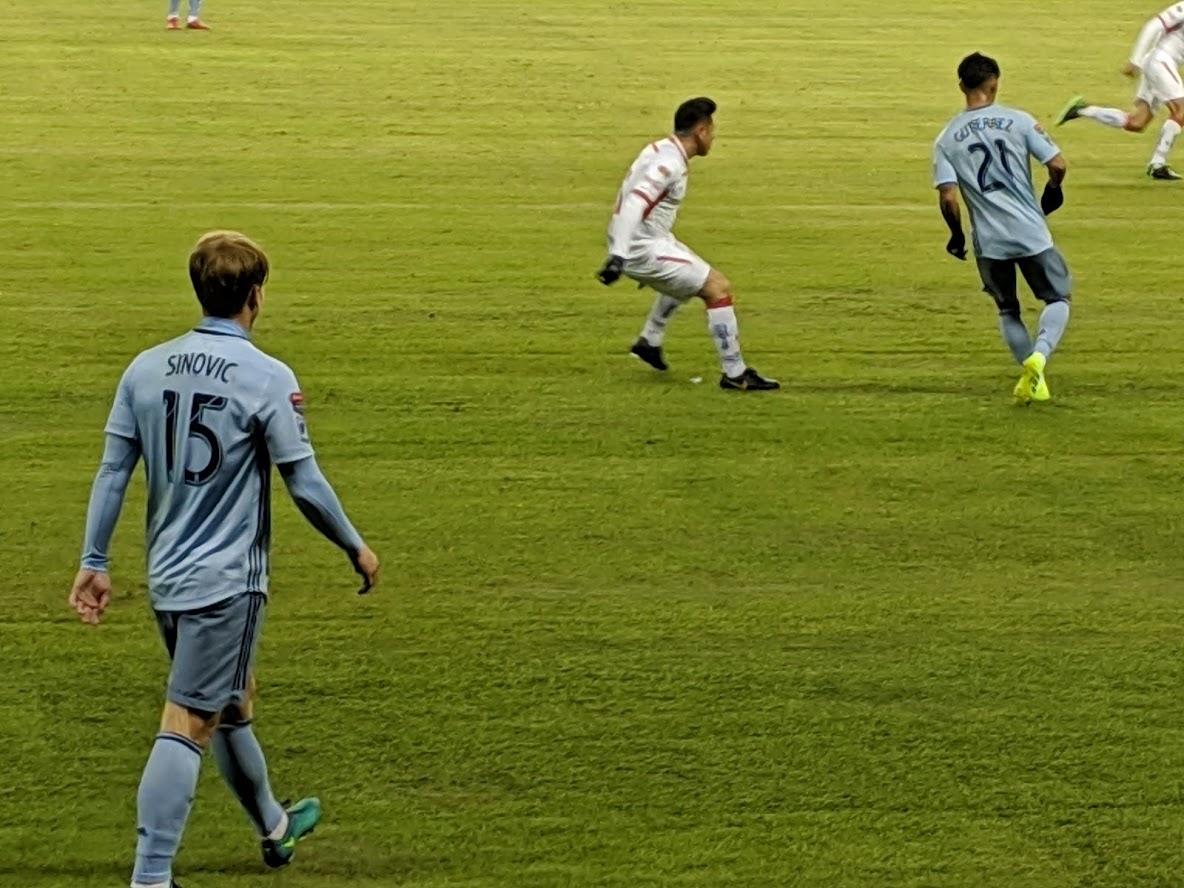
Sinovic in action against Deportivo Toluca F.C. in CONCACAF Champions League

After being waived by New England, Sinovic went on trial with fellow Major League Soccer club Real Salt Lake in April 2011, and played a couple of games in the MLS Reserve Division, but was not offered a contract by the team. After leaving Salt Lake, Sinovic signed with Sporting Kansas City on May 10, 2011.

Sinovic was left exposed by Sporting Kansas City in the 2011 MLS Expansion Draft and was selected by expansion side Montreal Impact. However, five days later, Sinovic was shipped back to Kansas City with allocation money in exchange for Davy Arnaud.

Sinovic was a starting member of the Sporting KC MLS Cup 2013 championship team. He played a full 120 minutes, including overtime, then successfully scored a penalty kick.

He was honored as the Sporting Kansas City Defensive Player of the Year for his performance during the 2014 season.

Sinovic scored five goals in his professional career. Two occurred during the MLS postseason and one each in MLS regular-season play, CONCACAF Champions League play and on loan with USL affiliate Swope Park Rangers.

He announced his retirement as an active player on September 23, 2021 after appearing in 282 matches throughout his career.

== Honors ==
=== Sporting Kansas City ===
- Lamar Hunt U.S. Open Cup: 2012, 2015, 2017
- MLS Cup: 2013
