= Matt Besler =

American soccer player (born 1987)

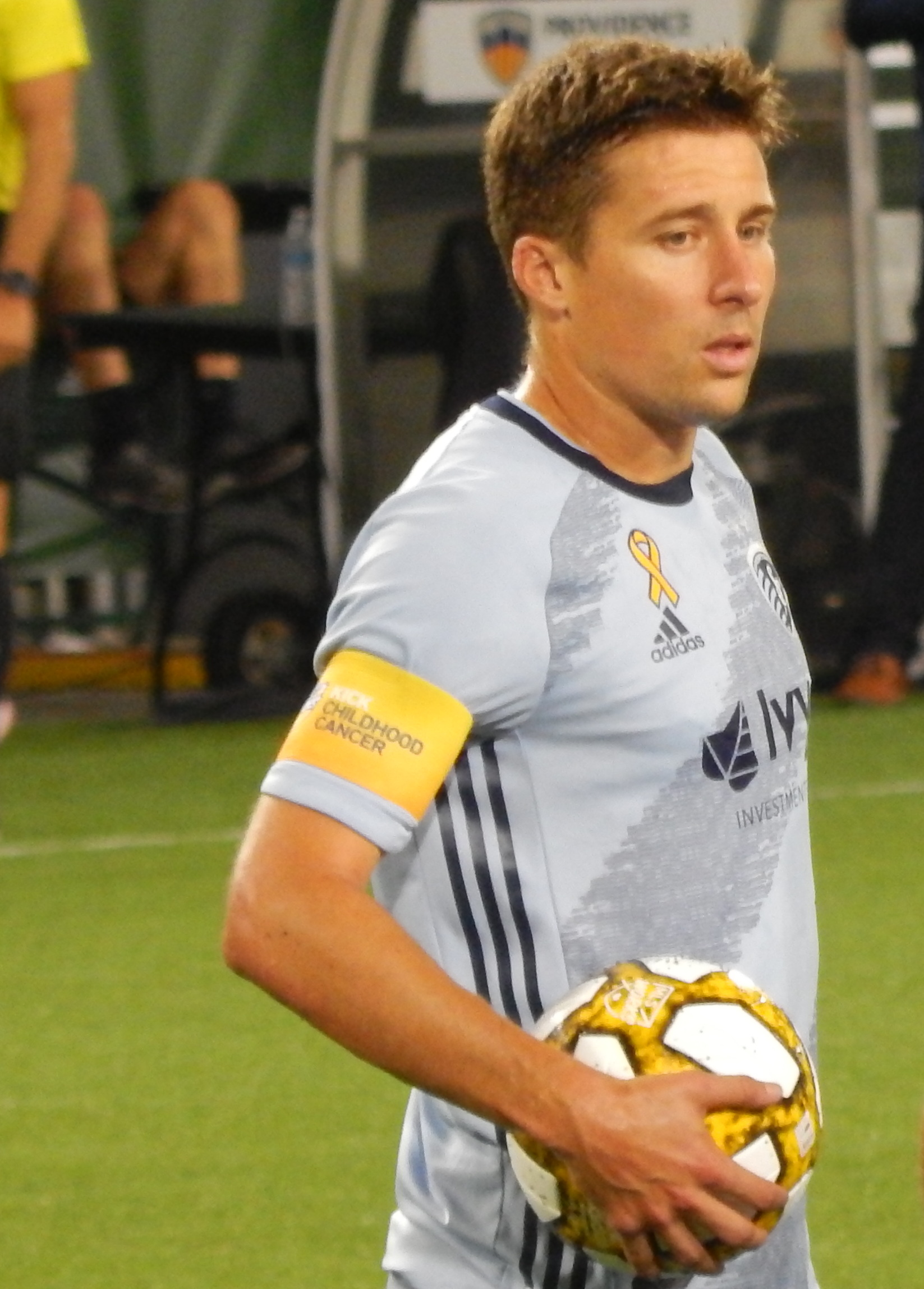
- Besler with Sporting Kansas City in 2019

Personal information
- Full name: Matthew Scott Besler
- Date of birth: February 11, 1987 (age 39)
- Place of birth: Overland Park, Kansas, United States
- Height: 6 ft 0 in (1.83 m)
- Position: Defender

Youth career
- 2001–2005: Blue Valley West High School
- 2001–2005: KCFC Alliance

College career
Years	Team	Apps	(Gls)
2005–2008	Notre Dame Fighting Irish	90	(5)

Senior career*
Years	Team	Apps	(Gls)
2009–2020	Sporting Kansas City (Note: The club was known as the Kansas City Wizards prior to rebranding as Sporting Kansas City in 2011)	294	(3)
2021	Austin FC	20	(0)
Total		314	(3)

International career^{‡}
2006	United States U20	1	(0)
2013–2017	United States	47	(1)
Medal record
Men's Soccer
Representing United States
CONCACAF Gold Cup
Winner	2013 United States
Winner	2017 United States
CONCACAF Cup
Runner-up	2015 United States
- * Club domestic league appearances and goals as of November 10, 2021 ‡ National team caps and goals as of October 10, 2017

Matthew Scott Besler (/ˈbiːzlər/; born February 11, 1987) is a former professional soccer player. Primarily a left-sided central defender, Besler spent the majority of his career in MLS with Sporting Kansas City, where he helped the team win the 2013 MLS Cup and three U.S. Open Cups. He was the MLS Defender of the Year in 2012 and a five-time MLS All-Star. From 2013 to 2017, Besler represented the United States national team, including at the 2014 FIFA World Cup.

== Youth and college ==
Besler was a four-year All-Conference player at Blue Valley West High School in Overland Park, Kansas. He led Blue Valley West to the Kansas 5A State Championship as a senior, scoring 23 goals with 19 assists, and was named the 2004 Gatorade Player of the Year in Kansas. Besler was named the 2004 Kansas City Star Metro Player of the Year, and an NSCAA High School All-American. He was also a member of the KCFC Alliance club team and a key member of the Region II Olympic Developmental Program (ODP) alongside United States national team teammate Michael Bradley. Besler competed in the 2004 Adidas ESP Camp and was named an All-Star.

Besler played college soccer at the University of Notre Dame, playing in 90 games (73 starts) and scoring 5 goals during his college career. He became the first player in program history to be named an All-American and Academic All-American in the same year. He was named the NSCAA 2008 Senior College Men's Scholar All-America Player of the Year, and was named to the All Big East Team three times. He helped Notre Dame gain four straight berths in the NCAA championship, including the program's first two trips to the quarterfinals in 2006 and 2007.

== Professional career ==
Besler was drafted in the first round (eighth overall) in the 2009 MLS SuperDraft by the Kansas City Wizards. He made his professional debut on March 28, 2009, as an 87th-minute substitute during a 2–1 loss at the Colorado Rapids. He scored his first professional goal on March 26, 2011, in a 3–2 loss to the Chicago Fire. Besler was named an MLS All-Star team in 2011 for the first time in his career. In 2012, Besler anchored the top defense in MLS with Sporting Kansas City and helped the club win the U.S. Open Cup by converting his attempt after the game against the Seattle Sounders went into penalty kicks. He also was named 2012 MLS Defender of the Year and part of the MLS Best XI.

On December 12, 2012, Besler re-signed with Sporting Kansas City on a three-year deal, passing up trial offers from Queens Park Rangers, Southampton, and Birmingham City.

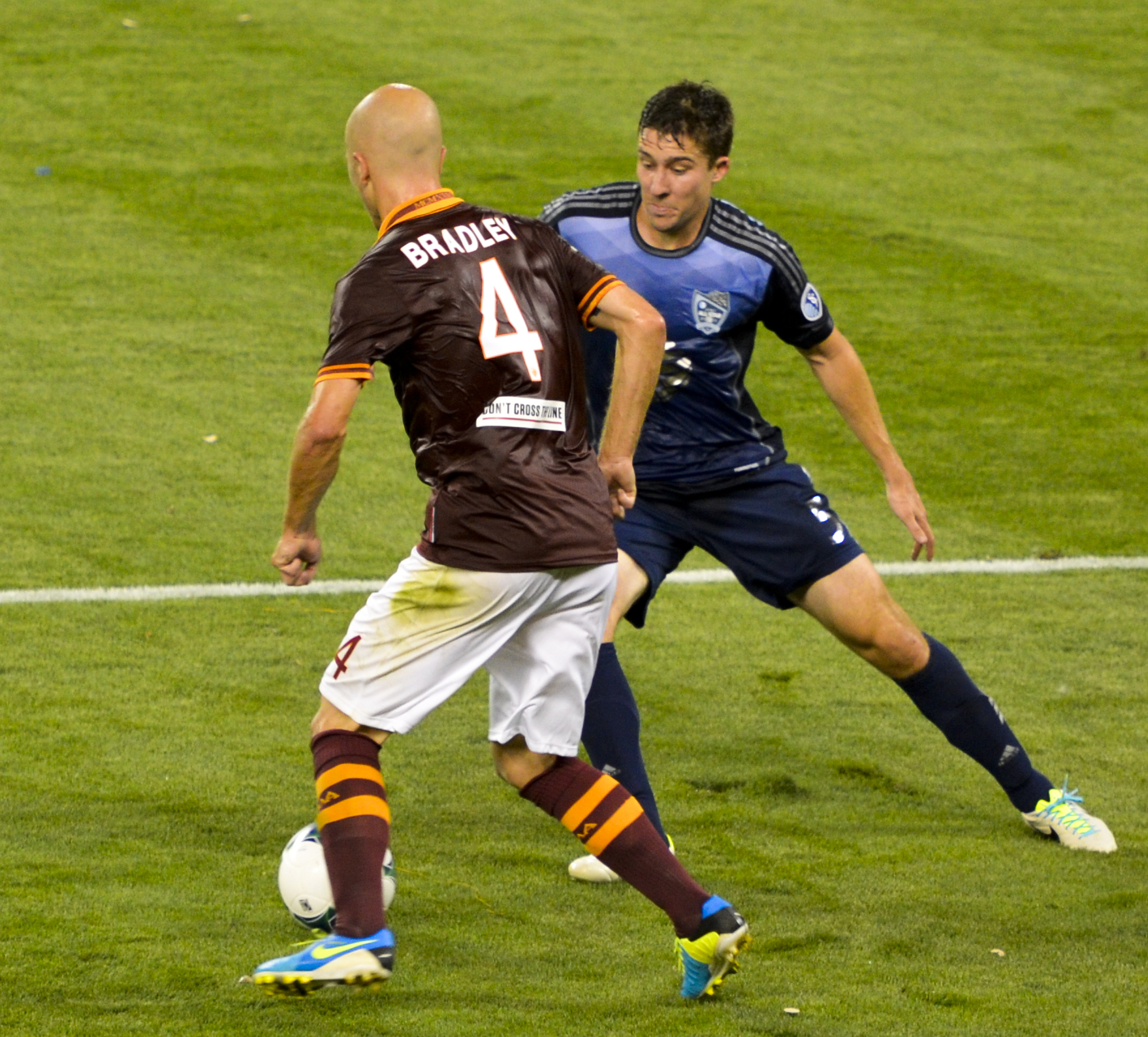
U.S. teammates Michael Bradley and Besler vie for the ball in the 2013 MLS All-Star Game.

Besler was announced an MLS All-Star in 2013, as well as in 2014, 2015, and the 2016 MLS All-Star Game.

Besler help lead Sporting Kansas City to an MLS Cup Championship in 2013, as well as additional U.S. Open Cup Championships in 2015 and 2017.

Throughout the 2018 season, Besler became the all-time leader in each of the club's longevity categories, overtaking club legends such as Davy Arnaud and Kerry Zavagnin for games played, games started, and minutes played both in MLS play and in all competitions. Kansas City opted not to renew Besler's contract following the 2020 season.

On January 6, 2021, Besler signed as a free agent with Austin FC ahead of their inaugural season in MLS. Following the 2021 season, Besler announced his retirement from playing professional soccer.

== International career ==
On August 23, 2012, Besler was called up to the United States team by head coach Jürgen Klinsmann for a friendly against Mexico, but he did not appear in the match. Besler made his debut appearance for the United States on January 29, 2013, in a friendly match against Canada.

Besler became the regular starting left-center back for the United States under head coach Jürgen Klinsmann. He was rated the top performer during the 2014 CONCACAF World Cup Qualifying matches.

On March 26, 2013, Besler made his debut World Cup qualifying appearance in a 0–0 draw at Mexico. On June 2, Besler started as the United States defeated Germany 4–3 in an international friendly played at RFK Stadium. Subsequently, Besler started in the World Cup qualifying wins against Jamaica, Panama, and Honduras.

After being left off of the initial roster for the 2013 CONCACAF Gold Cup so that the team could evaluate other players, Besler was added to strengthen the squad after the United States qualified for the knockout round. The team went on to win the 2013 Gold Cup Final against Panama at Soldier Field in Chicago, Illinois.

Besler was selected for U.S. national team 23-man roster for the 2014 FIFA World Cup. He started all three games of the group stage and their Round of 16 game, helping the U.S. make it through the group stage for consecutive World Cups. Following his strong performance in the World Cup, several European outfits placed offers and expressed interest in signing Besler, including Freiburg, Fulham and Sunderland. However, Besler was awarded a long-term Designated Player contract by Sporting Kansas City.

He scored his debut national team goal on September 2, 2016, with an assist from Sporting Kansas City teammate Graham Zusi. This was the same day his first child was born.

Besler was a part of the U.S. national team that won the 2017 CONCACAF Gold Cup. Besler made four appearances in the tournament, including a start in the final as the U.S. beat Jamaica 2–1 on a late goal from Jordan Morris as Besler lifted his second international title.

=== International goals ===
Scores and results list United States' goal tally first.

No	Date	Venue	Opponent	Score	Result	Competition
1.	September 2, 2016	Arnos Vale Stadium, Kingstown, Saint Vincent and the Grenadines	Saint Vincent and the Grenadines	2–0	6–0	2018 FIFA World Cup qualification

== Personal ==
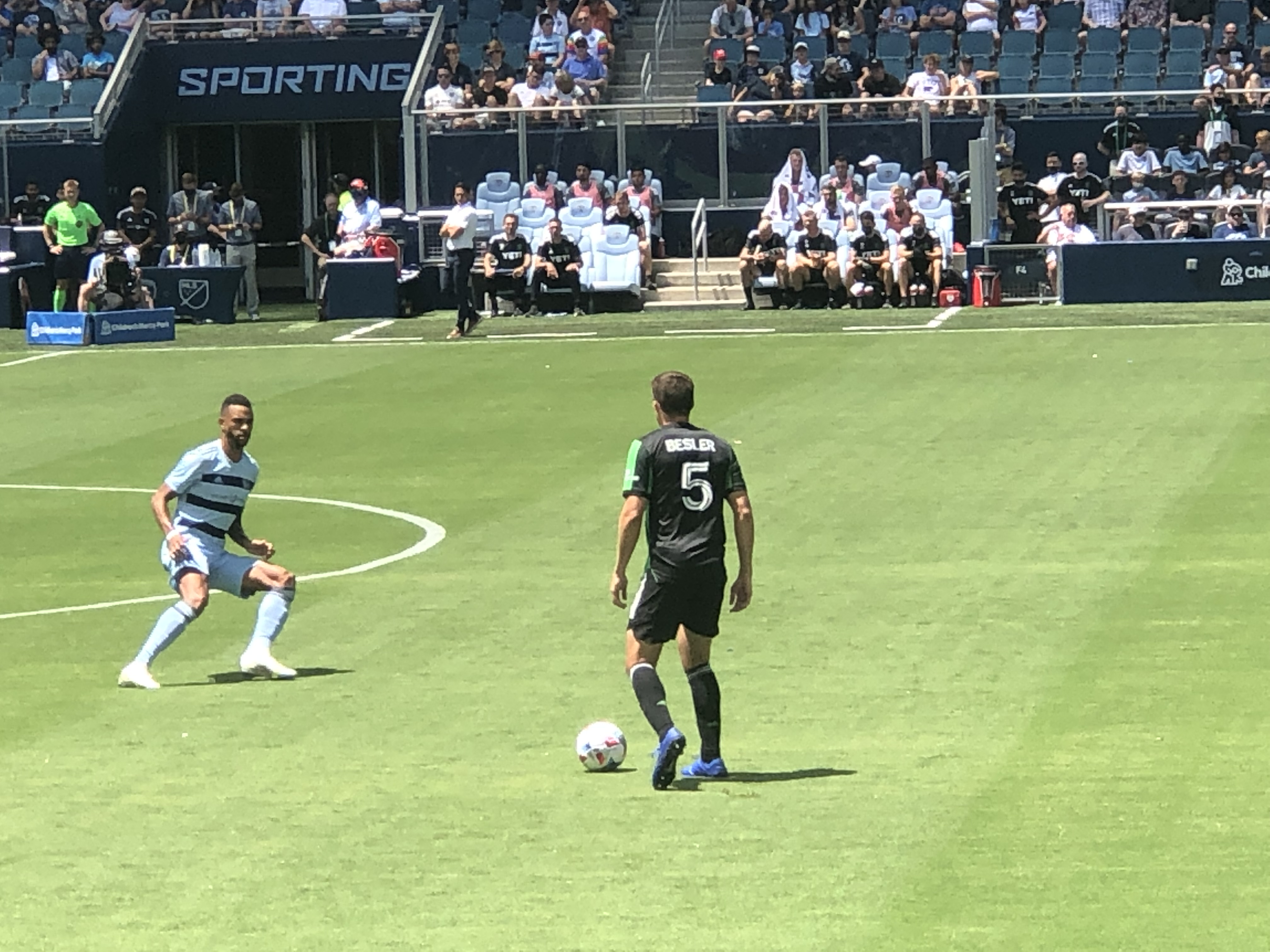
Besler (right) facing off against Khiry Shelton of Sporting Kansas City, June 2021

Besler is known throughout his hometown of Kansas City for his willingness to give back to the community. In April 2012, Besler was named W.O.R.K.S. Humanitarian of the month by Major League Soccer.

His youngest brother, Nick, was drafted by the Portland Timbers 5th overall in the 2015 MLS SuperDraft, and played for MLS club Real Salt Lake.

Besler married his wife, Amanda, in December 2013.

== Career statistics ==
As of December 31, 2021

Club	Season	League			Playoffs		National cup		Continental		Total	
Club	Season	Division	Apps	Goals	Apps	Goals	Apps	Goals	Apps	Goals	Apps	Goals
Sporting Kansas City	2009	MLS	28	0	0	0	0	0	3	0	32	0
Sporting Kansas City	2010	MLS	12	0	0	0	0	0	0	0	12	0
Sporting Kansas City	2011	MLS	32	2	3	0	2	0	0	0	37	2
Sporting Kansas City	2012	MLS	31	0	2	0	5	0	0	0	38	0
Sporting Kansas City	2013	MLS	23	0	5	0	0	0	2	0	30	0
Sporting Kansas City	2014	MLS	24	0	1	0	0	0	5	0	30	0
Sporting Kansas City	2015	MLS	32	0	1	0	5	0	0	0	38	0
Sporting Kansas City	2016	MLS	18	1	1	0	1	0	0	0	20	1
Sporting Kansas City	2017	MLS	26	0	1	0	3	0	0	0	30	0
Sporting Kansas City	2018	MLS	31	0	4	0	1	0	0	0	36	0
Sporting Kansas City	2019	MLS	27	0	0	0	0	0	6	0	33	0
Sporting Kansas City	2020	MLS	10	0	0	0	0	0	0	0	10	0
Sporting Kansas City	Total		294	3	18	0	17	0	16	0	345	3
Austin FC	2021	MLS	20	0	0	0	0	0	0	0	20	0
Career total			314	3	18	0	17	0	16	0	365	3

== Honors ==
=== Blue Valley West High School ===
- Kansas 5A State Championship: 2005

=== Notre Dame Fighting Irish ===
- Conference Regular Season: 2007, 2008

=== Sporting Kansas City ===
- MLS Cup: 2013
- Eastern Conference Playoffs: 2013
- Eastern Conference Regular Season: 2011, 2012
- Western Conference Regular Season: 2018, 2020
- U.S. Open Cup: 2012, 2015, 2017

=== United States ===
- CONCACAF Gold Cup: 2013, 2017

=== Individual ===
- Gatorade Player of the Year: 2004
- Kansas City Star Metro Player of the Year: 2004
- NSCAA High School All-American: 2004
- Adidas ESP Camp All-Star: 2004
- NSCAA Senior College Men's Scholar All-America Player of the Year: 2008
- MLS SuperDraft: 2009
- Sporting Kansas City Defensive Player of the Year: 2011, 2015
- W.O.R.K.S. Humanitarian of the month: April 2012
- MLS Defender of the Year: 2012
- MLS Breakout Player of the Year: 2012
- MLS Best XI: 2012, 2013
- MLS All-Star: 2011, 2013, 2014, 2015, 2016
- CONCACAF Champions League Fair Play Award: 2019

== Notes ==
Sporting positions
Preceded by Jimmy Nielsen	Sporting Kansas City captain 2014–2020	Succeeded by Johnny Russell
