= 2026 Sporting Kansas City season =

Season of an American soccer team

Sporting Kansas City
2026 season
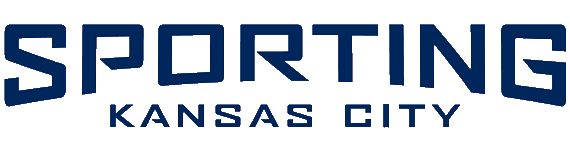
- Owner: Sporting Club
- Head coach: Raphaël Wicky
- Stadium: Sporting Park
- MLS: Conference: 15th Overall: 29th
- MLS Cup playoffs: Did not qualify
- U.S. Open Cup: Round of 32
- Top goalscorer: League: André Luiz (8); All: André Luiz (8)
Home colors	Away colors	Third colors

The 2026 Sporting Kansas City season was the 31st season of the team's existence in Major League Soccer (MLS) and the 16th year played under the Sporting Kansas City moniker.

== Roster ==
As of September 10, 2026

Note: Flags indicate national team as defined under FIFA eligibility rules; some limited exceptions apply. Players may hold more than one non-FIFA nationality.

No.	Pos.	Nation	Player
1	GK	USA	John Pulskamp
2	DF	USA	Ian James
3	DF	COL	Moisés Mosquera
4	MF	NOR	Lasse Berg Johnsen
5	DF	ISR	Or Blorian
7	FW	ANG	Capita
8	DF	USA	Jake Davis
11	FW	BRA	André Luiz
12	GK	USA	Jack Kortkamp
13	DF	USA	Justin Reynolds
14	FW	ENG	Calvin Harris
15	DF	USA	Jansen Miller
16	MF	USA	Jacob Bartlett

No.	Pos.	Nation	Player
17	FW	CAN	Stephen Afrifa
18	DF	BIH	Emir Karić
19	FW	USA	Taylor Calheira
20	MF	GHA	Kwaku Agyabeng
22	DF	CAN	Zorhan Bassong
24	FW	USA	Ruben Ramos Jr (on loan from LA Galaxy)
28	DF	USA	Wyatt Meyer
29	FW	JAM	Seymour Reid (on loan from New York City FC)
30	GK	USA	Stefan Cleveland
33	MF	USA	Owen Wolff
57	DF	BRA	Diego Borges
93	FW	RUS	Shapi Suleymanov
99	DF	USA	Jayden Reid

== Exhibitions ==
=== Preseason ===
Sporting Kansas City released their preseason schedule and roster on January 11, 2026.

==== Match results ====
January 17 Friendly	Sporting Kansas City	1–0	FIU Panthers	Palm Beach, Florida
9:00 AM CST	Suleymanov 8'	Report
Note: Played as two 30-minute halves.

January 24 Friendly	Sporting Kansas City	0–1	Chicago Fire FC	Palm Beach, Florida
9:00 AM CST		Report	Bamba 14'

January 31 Friendly	Sporting Kansas City	0–1	Charlotte FC	Palm Beach, Florida
10:00 AM CST		Report	Biel 87'

February 7 Friendly	Sporting Kansas City	0–3	Minnesota United FC	Indio, California
3:30 PM CST		Report	Markanich 35', 68'; Yeboah 57'

February 11 Friendly	Sporting Kansas City	2–1	New York City FC	Indio, California
3:30 PM CST	Harris 23'; Joveljić 26'	Report	Reid 50' (pen.)

February 14 Friendly	Austin FC	0–2	Sporting Kansas City	Indio, California
12:00 PM CST		Report	Joveljić 42'; Sallói 89'

== Competitive ==
=== Major League Soccer ===
==== Standings ====
===== Western Conference =====
MLS Western Conference table (2026)
Pos	Team	Pld	W	L	T	GF	GA	GD	Pts
11	LA Galaxy	34	11	12	11	50	57	−7	44
12	Colorado Rapids	34	12	15	7	47	50	−3	43
13	San Diego FC	34	9	14	11	57	63	−6	38
14	Austin FC	34	8	16	10	42	65	−23	34
15	Sporting Kansas City	34	7	22	5	40	81	−41	26

Source: MLS
Rules for classification: 1) points; 2) total wins; 3) total goal differential; 4) total goals scored; 5) fewer disciplinary points; 6) away goal differential; 7) away goals scored; 8) home goals differential; 9) home goals scored; 10) coin toss (2 clubs tied) or drawing of lots (≥3 clubs tied)

===== Overall table =====
Overall MLS standings table
Pos	Team	Pld	W	L	T	GF	GA	GD	Pts
26	Austin FC	34	8	16	10	42	65	−23	34
27	Atlanta United FC	34	9	19	6	43	60	−17	33
28	D.C. United	34	7	15	12	39	61	−22	33
29	Sporting Kansas City	34	7	22	5	40	81	−41	26
30	CF Montréal	34	6	20	8	37	69	−32	26

Source: MLS
Rules for classification: 1) points; 2) total wins; 3) total goal differential; 4) total goals scored; 5) fewer disciplinary points; 6) away goal differential; 7) away goals scored; 8) home goals differential; 9) home goals scored; 10) coin toss (2 clubs tied) or drawing of lots (≥3 clubs tied)

==== Match results ====
February 21 1	San Jose Earthquakes	3–0	Sporting Kansas City	San Jose, California
9:30 PM CST	Munie (yellow card) 36', (goal) 42', 54'; Judd 45+1'	Report		Stadium: PayPal Park; Attendance: 16,367; Referee: Alexis Da Silva

February 28 2	Sporting Kansas City	2–2	Columbus Crew	Kansas City, Kansas
7:30 PM CST	Bartlett (yellow card) 44'; Joveljić 48', 72'	Report	Abou Ali 33'; Rossi 82'	Stadium: Sporting Park; Attendance: 18,522; Referee: Sergii Demianchuk

March 7 3	Sporting Kansas City	0–1	San Diego FC	Kansas City, Kansas
7:30 PM CST	Miller (yellow card) 36'; García (yellow card) 38'; Davis (yellow card) 81'	Report	Bombino (yellow card) 27'; Dreyer 39'; Duah (yellow card) 75'; McVey (yellow card) 78'; Vazquez (yellow card) 80'	Stadium: Sporting Park; Attendance: 14,294; Referee: Malik Badawi

March 14 4	LA Galaxy	1–2	Sporting Kansas City	Carson, California
8:30 PM CDT	Cerrillo (yellow card) 78'; Reus 82'	Report	Joveljić 45+2'; Meyer (yellow card) 69'; Berg Johnsen 74'	Stadium: Dignity Health Sports Park; Attendance: 18,232; Referee: Ismail Elfath

March 21 5	Sporting Kansas City	1–4	Colorado Rapids	Kansas City, Kansas
7:30 PM CDT	García (yellow card) 5'; Miller (yellow card) 38'; Suleymanov 44'; Bartlett (yellow card) 77'	Report	Aaronson 12', 75'; Herrington (yellow card) 39'; Holding (yellow card) 42'; Frederick 45+2'; M. Navarro (yellow card) 60'; R. Navarro 71'	Stadium: Sporting Park; Attendance: 17,037; Referee: Fotis Bazakos

April 4 6	Real Salt Lake	3–1	Sporting Kansas City	Sandy, Utah
3:30 PM CDT	Luna 4'; Solans 55'; Gozo 82'; Guilavogui (yellow card) 88'	Report	Joveljić 59'	Stadium: America First Field; Attendance: 20,290; Referee: Timothy Ford

April 11 7	Sporting Kansas City	1–3	San Jose Earthquakes	Kansas City, Kansas
7:30 PM CDT	Bartlett 27'; Suleymanov (yellow card) 54'; Calheira (yellow card) 82'	Report	Skahan 45', 49'; Romney 75'	Stadium: Sporting Park; Attendance: 16,921; Referee: Allen Chapman

April 17 8	Vancouver Whitecaps FC	3–0	Sporting Kansas City	Vancouver, British Columbia
9:30 PM CDT	Sabbi 13'; Caicedo 23'; Müller 28'; Berhalter (yellow card) 68'	Report	Harris (yellow card) 32'; Borges (yellow card) 66'	Stadium: BC Place; Attendance: 21,777; Referee: Elijio Arreguin

April 25 9	Chicago Fire FC	5–0	Sporting Kansas City	Chicago, Illinois
7:30 PM CDT	Gutman (yellow card) 10'; Zinckernagel 51', 65'; Cuypers 73', 90+8'; Haile-Selassie 79'	Report		Stadium: Soldier Field; Attendance: 17,892; Referee: Brandon Stevis

May 2 10	Sporting Kansas City	1–1	Seattle Sounders FC	Kansas City, Kansas
1:30 PM CDT	Joveljić 16'	Report	Rothrock 2'; Ragen (yellow card) 31'; Dotson (yellow card) 90'	Stadium: Sporting Park; Attendance: 16,378; Referee: Sergii Demianchuk

May 9 11	Portland Timbers	6–0	Sporting Kansas City	Portland, Oregon
9:30 PM CDT	Velde 6'; Kelsy 15', 74'; Bassett 22'; Davis 26' (o.g.); Caicedo (yellow card) 33'; Lassiter 71'	Report	Berg Johnsen (yellow card) 19'; Davis (yellow card) 41'; Reid (yellow card) 45+3'; Bartlow (yellow card) 53'; Capemba (yellow card) 76'	Stadium: Providence Park; Attendance: 22,384; Referee: Ramy Touchan

May 13 12	Sporting Kansas City	3–1	LA Galaxy	Kansas City, Kansas
7:30 PM CDT	Capemba 32'; Bassong (yellow card) 41'; Joveljić 45+4'; Harris 70'	Report	Cuevas (yellow card) 49'; Pec (yellow card) 79', (goal) 89'	Stadium: Sporting Park; Attendance: 14,188; Referee: Ricardo Montero

May 16 13	Austin FC	1–2	Sporting Kansas City	Austin, Texas
7:30 PM CDT	Desler 45+1'; Svatok (yellow card) 57'; Sánchez (yellow card) 61'; Nelson (yellow card) 71'; Fodrey (yellow card) 86'	Report	Capemba (yellow card) 28'; Davis (yellow card) 47'; Bassong (yellow card) 63'; García 79'; Afrifa 82'	Stadium: Q2 Stadium; Attendance: 20,738; Referee: Marcos de Oliveira

May 23 14	Sporting Kansas City	1–2	New York Red Bulls	Kansas City, Kansas
7:30 PM CDT	Harris 64'; Berg Johnsen (yellow card) 70'	Report	Ruvalcaba 4', 45+3'; Marshall-Rutty (yellow card) 45+1'; Benedetti (yellow card) 87'	Stadium: Sporting Park; Attendance: 17,575; Referee: Nabil Bensalah

July 16 15	St. Louis City SC	3–2	Sporting Kansas City	St. Louis, Missouri
7:30 PM CDT	Jeong Sang-bin 28'; Hartel 36'; Löwen 85' (pen.); Lundt (yellow card) 90'; Edelman (yellow card) 90+7'	Report	Capita 42', (yellow card) 78'; Joveljić 76'	Stadium: Energizer Park; Attendance: 22,423; Referee: Allen Chapman

July 22 16	Sporting Kansas City	2–1	Minnesota United FC	Kansas City, Kansas
7:30 PM CDT	Joveljić 28', (yellow card) 74'; Capita (yellow card) 45+2'; García 54'	Report	Duncan (yellow card) 21'; Pereyra (yellow card) 56'; Padelford 75'; Hlongwane (yellow card) 84'	Stadium: Sporting Park; Attendance: 15,378; Referee: Matthew Corrigan

July 25 17	Los Angeles FC	4–0	Sporting Kansas City	Los Angeles, California
9:30 PM CDT	Son Heung-min 5'; Bouanga 37', 85'; Martínez 45+4'	Report	García (yellow card) 2'; Harris (yellow card) 75'	Stadium: BMO Stadium; Attendance: 22,030; Referee: Ricardo Fierro

August 1 18	Sporting Kansas City	0–2	Houston Dynamo FC	Kansas City, Kansas
7:30 PM CDT	Johnsen (yellow card) 11' (red card) 45'	Report	Guilherme 55'; Bouzat 71'; Halter (yellow card) 86'	Stadium: Sporting Park; Attendance: 17,268; Referee: Sergii Boiko

August 15 19	Colorado Rapids	2–0	Sporting Kansas City	Commerce City, Colorado
8:30 PM CDT	Cannon 65'; Atencio (yellow card) 84'; Navarro 90+5'	Report	Bassong (yellow card) 30'; Agyabeng (red card) 38'; Suleymanov (yellow card) 63'; Mosquera (yellow card) 88' (red card) 90+2'	Stadium: Dick's Sporting Goods Park; Attendance: 15,088; Referee: Guido Gonzales Jr.

August 19 20	Sporting Kansas City	1–1	St. Louis City SC	Kansas City, Kansas
7:00 PM CDT	Bassong (yellow card) 15'; Miller (yellow card) 45'; Harris 55'	Report	Durkin (yellow card) 21'; Löwen 45+2'; Wallem (yellow card) 61'	Stadium: Sporting Park; Attendance: 15,355; Referee: Victor Rivas

August 23 21	Atlanta United FC	2–1	Sporting Kansas City	Atlanta, Georgia
6:00 PM CDT	Jacob 13'; Picault 24'; Brennan (yellow card) 72'; Báez (yellow card) 76'	Report	Karić (yellow card) 22'; Afrifa 70'	Stadium: Mercedes-Benz Stadium; Attendance: 36,626; Referee: Tori Penso

August 29 22	Sporting Kansas City	0–3	Vancouver Whitecaps FC	Kansas City, Kansas
7:30 PM CDT	Afrifa (yellow card) 73'; Mosquera (yellow card) 90+5'	Report	Müller 40' (pen.); Caicedo (yellow card) 45+4'; Brian White 48'; Johnson (yellow card) 51'; Elloumi 90'	Stadium: Sporting Park; Attendance: 14,879; Referee: Marcos de Oliveira

September 5 23	FC Dallas	4–3	Sporting Kansas City	Frisco, Texas
7:30 PM CDT	Farrington 27'; Musa 30', 90+7' (pen.); Kaick 45'	Report	Calheira 4', 78'; Afrifa 19'; Mosquera (yellow card) 88'; Karić (yellow card) 90+10'	Stadium: Toyota Stadium; Attendance: 10,925; Referee: Lorenzo Hernandez

September 12 24	Sporting Kansas City	3–1	Los Angeles FC	Kansas City, Kansas
7:30 PM CDT	André Luiz 18'; Calheira 31'; Agyabeng (yellow card) 44'; Bartlett 71'; Harris (yellow card) 82'	Report	Palencia (yellow card) 19'; Bouanga 47'; Cheberko (yellow card) 80'	Stadium: Sporting Park; Attendance: 15,738; Referee: Chris Penso

September 19 25	Sporting Kansas City	3–4	Philadelphia Union	Kansas City, Kansas
7:30 PM CDT	Luiz 5', 10'; Meyer 16'; Agyabeng (yellow card) 45'; Johnsen (yellow card) 53'; Bassong (yellow card) 90+7'	Report	Bueno (yellow card) 45+7'; Damiani 64'; C. Sullivan 66', (yellow card) 70'; Iloski 68'; Bassong 73' (o.g.); Wagner (yellow card) 79'; Jacques (yellow card) 90+6'	Stadium: Sporting Park; Attendance: 14,534; Referee: Katja Koroleva

September 26 26	Houston Dynamo FC	0–2	Sporting Kansas City	Houston, Texas
7:30 PM CDT	Herrera (red card) 45+3'; Bouzat (yellow card) 54'	Report	Reynolds (yellow card) 1'; Luiz 27', (yellow card) 45+6'; Harris 45'; Calheira (yellow card) 45+4'; Afrifa (yellow card) 68'	Stadium: Shell Energy Stadium; Attendance: 18,565; Referee: Timothy Ford

October 1 27	Seattle Sounders FC	2–1	Sporting Kansas City	Seattle, Washington
8:30 PM CDT	Gomez 51'; Nouhou (yellow card) 61'; Roldan 90'	Report	Luiz 44'; Bartlett (yellow card) 90+1'	Stadium: Lumen Field; Attendance: 28,587; Referee: Jair Marrufo
Note: Originally scheduled for September 9 and moved due to a conflict with a Seattle Seahawks game.

October 10 28	Sporting Kansas City	3–3	Portland Timbers	Kansas City, Kansas
7:30 PM CDT	André Luiz (penalty missed) 45+7', 45+7', 73'; Reynolds 70'	Report	Da Costa 10'; Janssen (yellow card) 12', (goal) 45+4'; Lassiter 64'	Stadium: Sporting Park; Attendance: 14,825; Referee: Pierre-Luc Lauziere

October 14 29	Nashville SC	4–0	Sporting Kansas City	Nashville, Tennessee
7:30 PM CDT	Mukhtar 10'; Surridge 17'; Najar 29'; Madrigal 90+5' (pen.)	Report		Stadium: Geodis Park; Attendance: 23,807; Referee: Joshua Encarnación

October 17 30	Sporting Kansas City	1–3	Real Salt Lake	Kansas City, Kansas
7:30 PM CDT	Calheira 26'; Harris (yellow card) 74'; Bartlett (yellow card) 76'; Miller (yellow card) 90+2'	Report	Guilavogui 11', 61'; Solans 14'; de Fougerolles (yellow card) 45+1'; Sanabria (yellow card) 72'; Booth (yellow card) 90+1'; Spierings (yellow card) 90+1'	Stadium: Sporting Park; Attendance: 13,873; Referee: Alexis Da Silva

October 24 31	Sporting Kansas City	1–2	Austin FC	Kansas City, Kansas
7:30 PM CDT	Agyabeng (yellow card) 21'; Davis (yellow card) 37'; Afrifa (yellow card) 46', (goal) 55'; Bassong (yellow card) 52'; Wolff (yellow card) 90+5'	Report	Desler (yellow card) 37'; Sánchez (yellow card) 51'; Uzuni 64', 86'	Stadium: Sporting Park; Attendance: 13,928; Referee: Ricardo Fierro

October 28 32	Minnesota United FC	3–1	Sporting Kansas City	Saint Paul, Minnesota
7:30 PM CDT	Yeboah (yellow card) 45+4', (goal) 88'; González (yellow card) 59', (goal) 76'; Markanich (yellow card) 61', (goal) 72'; Valerius (yellow card) 71'	Report	Calheira 31'	Stadium: Allianz Field; Attendance: 18,354; Referee: Serhiy Boyko

October 31 33	Sporting Kansas City	1–1	FC Dallas	Kansas City, Kansas
2:00 PM CDT	Bartlett (yellow card) 39'; Miller 45+2'; Wolff (yellow card) 58'; Davis (yellow card) 64'	Report	Johansson 19'; Abubakar (yellow card) 26'; Ibeagha (yellow card) 53'; Urhoghide (yellow card) 83'; Sarver (yellow card) 89'	Stadium: Sporting Park; Attendance: 12,831; Referee: Fotis Bazakos

November 7 34	San Diego FC	0–1	Sporting Kansas City	San Diego, California
6:00 PM CST	Ingvartsen (yellow card) 57'; Duah (yellow card) 67'; McVey (yellow card) 73'	Report	Johnsen (yellow card) 61'; Reynolds (yellow card) 70'; André Luiz 76' (pen.)	Stadium: Snapdragon Stadium; Attendance: 23,695; Referee: Ramy Touchan

=== U.S. Open Cup ===
On December 4, 2025, the United States Soccer Federation announced the format and schedule for the 2026 U.S. Open Cup, and Sporting Kansas City's participation was confirmed.

April 14 Round of 32	Colorado Springs Switchbacks FC	3–0	Sporting Kansas City	Colorado Springs, Colorado
7:00 PM CDT	Tejada 11'; Masereka 31'; Rocha (yellow card) 79'; Bennett 84'	Report	Capita (yellow card) 22'; Davis (yellow card) 58'; Suleymanov (red card) 78'; Bartlow (yellow card) 87'	Stadium: Weidner Field; Attendance: 1,902; Referee: Corbyn May
