= Ian James =

Ian or Iain James may refer to:

- Ian James (athlete) (born 1963), Canadian Olympic long jumper
- Ian James (racing driver) (born 1974), British sportscar racer
- Iain James (born 1980), British singer-songwriter
- Ian James (soccer) (born 2008), American soccer player
