= Stephen Afrifa =

Canadian soccer player (born 2001)

Personal information
- Full name: Stephen Afrifa-Kodua
- Date of birth: February 19, 2001 (age 25)
- Place of birth: Toronto, Ontario, Canada
- Height: 5 ft 11 in (1.80 m)
- Position: Forward

Youth career
- Rexdale SC
- Woodbridge Strikers

College career
Years	Team	Apps	(Gls)
2019–2022	FIU Panthers	63	(23)

Senior career*
Years	Team	Apps	(Gls)
2018	Woodbridge Strikers	2	(0)
2022	One Knoxville SC	13	(8)
2023–2026	Sporting Kansas City II	11	(1)
2023–2026	Sporting Kansas City	64	(8)

International career^{‡}
2024–	Canada	2	(0)
- * Club domestic league appearances and goals as of November 7, 2026 ‡ National team caps and goals as of September 10, 2024

Stephen Afrifa-Kodua (born February 19, 2001) is a Canadian professional soccer player who most recently played as a forward for Major League Soccer club Sporting Kansas City and the Canada national team.

== College career ==
In 2019, Afrifa began attending Florida International University, where he played for the men's soccer team. He made his collegiate debut on August 30, 2019 against the St. Bonaventure Bonnies. The following day, he scored his first collegiate goal, in a victory over the James Madison Dukes. After his junior season in 2021, he was named to the All-Conference USA First Team and the All-Southeast Region First Team.

Ahead of his senior season in 2022, he was named to the United Soccer Coaches Watch List and the AAC Preseason All-Conference Team. That season, he was twice named the AAC Offensive Player of the Week. That season, he led the in goals scored with 10 and added four assists for a total of 24 points, which were all career highs for him. He helped FIU to win the 2022 American Athletic Conference regular season and tournament titles and was named the AAC Championship Most Outstanding Offensive Player and was named to the All-Tournament team. At the end of the season he was named to the All-AAC First Team, All-East Region First Team, and the All-America Second Team. He was also named a semifinalist for the MAC Hermann Trophy, which is awarded to the top collegiate player of the season. Over his four seasons, he scored 23 goals and added 11 assists in 63 appearances.

== Club career ==
In 2018, Afrifa played with the Woodbridge Strikers in League1 Ontario, making two appearances.

In March 2022, he joined One Knoxville SC in USL League Two. He scored 10 goals for the side between the season and the playoffs.

=== Sporting Kansas City ===
In December 2022, he was selected in the first round (eighth overall) in the 2023 MLS SuperDraft by Sporting Kansas City. In April 2023, he signed a professional contract with the club for the 2023 season, with club options from 2024 to 2026. He made his MLS debut on May 17, in a substitute appearance against Los Angeles FC. He also spent some time that season with the second team, Sporting Kansas City II, in MLS Next Pro, scoring his first professional goal on July 2, in a 7-1 victory over Whitecaps FC 2. At the end of the 2026 season, Sporting KC would announce that Afrifa's contract had ended and that he would not return to the club for 2027.

== International career ==
In February 2024, Afrifa was named to the Canadian provisional roster for the 2024 Copa América qualifying play-offs against Trinidad and Tobago. In August 2024, he received his first main squad call-up to Canada ahead of friendlies against the United States and Mexico. Afrifa made his debut in the first friendly against the USA on September 7, as a late substitute in a 2-1 victory.

== Personal ==
Afrifa is of Ghanaian descent. He has a twin brother, Simon, who also played soccer with him at FIU.

== Career statistics ==
As of match played November 7, 2026

Club	Season	League			Playoffs		National cup		Continental		Other		Total	
Club	Season	Division	Apps	Goals	Apps	Goals	Apps	Goals	Apps	Goals	Apps	Goals	Apps	Goals
Woodbridge Strikers	2018	League1 Ontario	2	0	0	0	—		—		0	0	2	0
One Knoxville SC	2022	USL League Two	13	8	3	2	—		—		—		16	10
Sporting Kansas City II	2023	MLS Next Pro	8	1	1	0	—		—		—		9	1
Sporting Kansas City II	2024	MLS Next Pro	2	0	0	0	—		—		—		2	0
Sporting Kansas City II	2025	MLS Next Pro	1	0	0	0	—		—		—		1	0
Sporting Kansas City II	Total		11	1	1	0	0	0	0	0	0	0	12	1
Sporting Kansas City	2023	Major League Soccer	3	0	0	0	1	0	0	0	0	0	4	0
Sporting Kansas City	2024	Major League Soccer	24	4	0	0	3	1	0	0	3	1	30	6
Sporting Kansas City	2025	Major League Soccer	9	0	0	0	0	0	1	0	0	0	10	0
Sporting Kansas City	2026	Major League Soccer	28	4	0	0	1	0	0	0	0	0	29	4
Sporting Kansas City	Total		64	8	0	0	5	1	1	0	3	1	73	10
Career total			89	17	4	2	5	1	1	0	3	1	101	21

=== International ===
As of match played September 10, 2024

Appearances and goals by national team and year
National team	Year	Apps	Goals
Canada	2024	2	0
Total		2	0
