= Jacob Bartlett =

American soccer player (born 2005)

Personal information
- Date of birth: October 7, 2005 (age 21)
- Place of birth: Kansas City, Missouri, U.S.
- Height: 6 ft 2 in (1.88 m)
- Position: Midfielder

Team information
- Current team: Sporting Kansas City
- Number: 16

Youth career
- 2017–2024: Sporting Kansas City

College career
Years	Team	Apps	(Gls)
2024	Notre Dame	16	(1)

Senior career*
Years	Team	Apps	(Gls)
2025–	Sporting Kansas City	35	(0)
- * Club domestic league appearances and goals as of 05:02, March 25, 2026 (UTC)

Jacob Bartlett (born October 7, 2005) is an American professional soccer player who plays as a midfielder for Major League Soccer club Sporting Kansas City. Bartlett signed as a homegrown player with the club ahead of the 2025 season.

== Youth and college ==
Bartlett joined the Sporting Kansas City academy in 2017, rising through the ranks to eventually make his debut with the second team, Sporting Kansas City II, in 2023, while still in high school. While with the academy, Bartlett won the 2019 LA Galaxy Cup and finished runners up at the 2020 US Youth Futsal National Championships with the Under-14 side. He was invited to join the first team for their 2023 and 2024 preseasons, featuring in a scrimmage against Portland Timbers on January 21, 2023.

Bartlett started the first seven matches of the 2024 Sporting Kansas City II season before leaving to link up with the Notre Dame Fighting Irish men's soccer team. He made 16 appearances with the Fighting Irish, featuring both in midfield and defense, playing under head coach Chad Riley. Notre Dame would not qualify for the NCAA tournament in what would be Bartlett's only season with the team. Bartlett continued with his college education after signing his first professional contract with Sporting Kansas City.

== Club career ==
=== Sporting Kansas City ===
On January 9, 2025, Bartlett signed a homegrown contract with Sporting Kansas City. He made an immediate impact with the first team, making his full debut against Inter Miami CF in the CONCACAF Champions Cup on February 19, 2025, the club's competitive season opener. Bartlett recorded his first assist in the return leg six days later. He started the club's first two matches in MLS and had a run of 16 consecutive starts from the end of March to the beginning of July, initially under long-time coach Peter Vermes and later under interim coach Kerry Zavagnin. Bartlett recorded 30 appearances in his first MLS season, making 22 starts, playing largely in defensive midfield as the club finished bottom of the Western Conference.

== Personal life ==
From an athletic family, both of Bartlett's parents were collegiate athletes at Doane University. His older brothers, Alec and Lucas, have played soccer professionally: Alec at USL level, and Lucas currently at Major League Soccer level with D.C. United. His sister, Grace, played collegiately at Grand Canyon University.

== Career statistics ==
=== Club ===
As of match played March 21, 2026

Appearances and goals by club, season and competition
Club	Season	League			Playoffs		National cup (Note: Includes U.S. Open Cup)		Continental		Other		Total	
Club	Season	Division	Apps	Goals	Apps	Goals	Apps	Goals	Apps	Goals	Apps	Goals	Apps	Goals
Sporting Kansas City II	2023	MLS Next Pro	1	0	0	0	—		—		—		1	0
Sporting Kansas City II	2024	MLS Next Pro	7	0	—		—		—		—		7	0
Sporting Kansas City II	2025	MLS Next Pro	1	0	—		0	0	—		—		1	0
Sporting Kansas City II	Total		9	0	—		0	0	—		—		9	0
Sporting Kansas City	2025	MLS	30	0	—		—		2 (Note: Appearance(s) in CONCACAF Champions League/Cup)	0	—		32	0
Sporting Kansas City	2026	MLS	5	0	0	0	—		—		—		5	0
Sporting Kansas City	Total		35	0	—		—		2	0	—		37	0
Career total			44	0	—		—		2	0	—		46	0
