= Zorhan Bassong =

Canadian soccer player (born 1999)

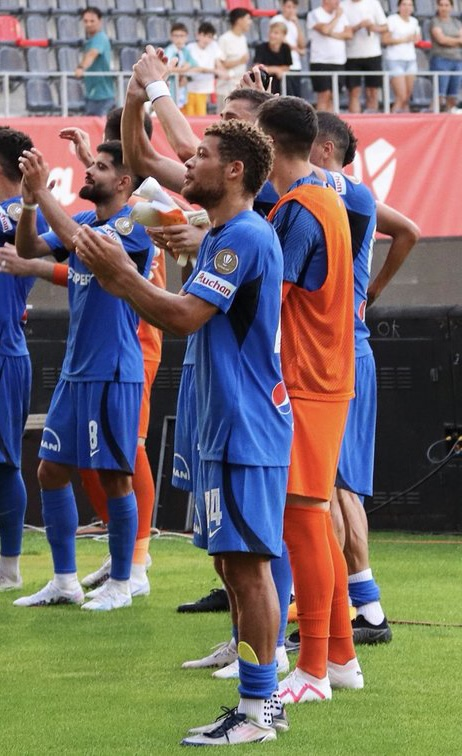
- Bassong (center) with Farul Constanța in 2023

Personal information
- Full name: Zorhan Ludovic Bassong
- Date of birth: May 7, 1999 (age 27)
- Place of birth: Toronto, Ontario, Canada
- Height: 1.78 m (5 ft 10 in)
- Position: Left-back

Team information
- Current team: Sporting Kansas City
- Number: 22

Youth career
- 2005–2013: CS Longueuil
- 2013–2014: Mouscron
- 2014–2016: Anderlecht
- 2016–2018: Lille

Senior career*
| Years | Team | Apps | (Gls) |
| 2016–2019 | Lille B | 31 | (0) |
| 2019–2020 | Cercle Brugge | 0 | (0) |
| 2021–2022 | CF Montréal | 36 | (0) |
| 2022 | → CF Montreal U23 (loan) | 2 | (0) |
| 2023 | Argeș Pitești | 8 | (0) |
| 2023 | Farul Constanța | 2 | (0) |
| 2024– | Sporting Kansas City | 65 | (1) |

International career^{‡}
| 2017 | Belgium U19 | 2 | (0) |
| 2021 | Canada U23 | 3 | (0) |
| 2020– | Canada | 9 | (0) |
| 2026 | Canada B | 1 | (0) |
- * Club domestic league appearances and goals as of October 24, 2026 ‡ National team caps and goals as of November 17, 2026

Zorhan Ludovic Bassong (born May 7, 1999) is a Canadian professional soccer player who plays as a left-back for Sporting Kansas City in Major League Soccer and the Canada national team.

== Early life ==
Bassong was born in Toronto, Ontario to a Belgian Walloon mother and Cameroonian father. At three months old, he and his family moved to Montreal, where he began playing youth soccer at age five with CS Longueuil.

== Club career ==
Bassong joined Cercle Brugge from Lille on January 29, 2019. He was released by the Belgian club on July 8, 2020.

On December 1, 2020, it was announced that Bassong had joined Canadian MLS side CF Montréal on a two-year contract, beginning in the 2021 season, with options for 2 additional years. After the 2022 season, his option was declined and he departed the club.

In January 2023, Bassong signed with Romanian club Argeș Pitești. He made eight appearances as the club was relegated to the Liga II at the end of the season.

In June 2023, Bassong signed with the reigning Liga I champions, Farul Constanța. In September 2023 Bassong and Farul Constanța agreed to mutually terminate his deal.

In December 2023, he returned to MLS, signing with Sporting Kansas City for the 2024 season, with club options for 2025 and 2026.

== International career ==
Bassong made his debut for Canada in a 4–1 friendly win over Barbados on January 10, 2020. He was later named to the Canadian U23 provisional roster for the 2020 CONCACAF Men's Olympic Qualifying Championship on February 26, 2020. Bassong was named to the final squad ahead of the rescheduled tournament on March 10, 2021.

== Career statistics ==
=== Club ===
As of match played October 24, 2026

Appearances and goals by club, season and competition
| Club | Season | League | | | National cup | | Continental | | Other | | Total | |
| Club | Season | Division | Apps | Goals | Apps | Goals | Apps | Goals | Apps | Goals | Apps | Goals |
|---|---|---|---|---|---|---|---|---|---|---|---|---|
| Lille B | 2016–17 | Championnat de France Amateur | 1 | 0 | — | | — | | — | | 1 | 0 |
| Lille B | 2017–18 | Championnat National 2 | 16 | 0 | — | | — | | — | | 16 | 0 |
| Lille B | 2018–19 | Championnat National 2 | 14 | 0 | — | | — | | — | | 14 | 0 |
| Lille B | Total | | 31 | 0 | 0 | 0 | 0 | 0 | 0 | 0 | 31 | 0 |
| CF Montréal | 2021 | MLS | 26 | 0 | 3 | 0 | — | | — | | 29 | 0 |
| CF Montréal | 2022 | MLS | 10 | 0 | 2 | 0 | 2 (Note: All appearances in CONCACAF Champions League/Cup) | 0 | 0 | 0 | 14 | 0 |
| CF Montréal | Total | | 36 | 0 | 5 | 0 | 2 | 0 | 5 | 0 | 43 | 0 |
| CF Montréal U23 (loan) | 2022 | PLSQ | 2 | 0 | — | | — | | — | | 2 | 0 |
| Argeș Pitești | 2022–23 | Liga I | 8 | 0 | 0 | 0 | — | | 2 (Note: All appearances in Liga I relegation play-offs) | 0 | 10 | 0 |
| Farul Constanța | 2023–24 | Liga I | 2 | 0 | 0 | 0 | 0 | 0 | 0 | 0 | 2 | 0 |
| Sporting Kansas City | 2024 | MLS | 21 | 0 | 3 | 0 | — | | 1 (Note: All appearances in Leagues Cup) | 0 | 25 | 0 |
| Sporting Kansas City | 2025 | MLS | 25 | 1 | 0 | 0 | 1 | 0 | — | | 26 | 1 |
| Sporting Kansas City | 2026 | MLS | 19 | 0 | 0 | 0 | — | | — | | 19 | 0 |
| Sporting Kansas City | Total | | 65 | 1 | 3 | 0 | 1 | 0 | 1 | 0 | 70 | 1 |
| Career total | | | 144 | 1 | 7 | 0 | 3 | 0 | 3 | 0 | 157 | 1 |

=== International ===
As of match played November 16, 2026

Appearances and goals by national team and year
| National team | Year | Apps | Goals |
|---|---|---|---|
| Canada | 2020 | 2 | 0 |
| Canada | 2025 | 5 | 0 |
| Canada | 2026 | 2 | 0 |
| Total | | 9 | 0 |

== Honours ==
CF Montréal

- Canadian Championship: 2021
