= André Luiz (footballer, born 2002) =

Brazilian footballer (born 2002)

Personal information
- Full name: André Luiz Inácio da Silva
- Date of birth: 23 February 2002 (age 24)
- Place of birth: Rio de Janeiro, Brazil
- Height: 1.85 m (6 ft 1 in)
- Position: Winger

Team information
- Current team: Sporting Kansas City
- Number: 11

Youth career
- Madureira
- 2019–2020: America-RJ
- 2020–2022: Flamengo

Senior career*
| Years | Team | Apps | (Gls) |
| 2021–2024 | Flamengo | 9 | (1) |
| 2023–2024 | → Estrela da Amadora (loan) | 27 | (4) |
| 2024–2025 | Estrela da Amadora | 11 | (1) |
| 2025–2026 | Rio Ave | 35 | (8) |
| 2026 | Olympiacos | 8 | (0) |
| 2026– | Sporting Kansas City | 13 | (8) |
- * Club domestic league appearances and goals as of 03:38, 8 November 2026 (UTC)

André Luiz Inácio da Silva (born 23 February 2002), commonly known as just André or André Luiz, is a Brazilian professional footballer who plays as a winger for Major League Soccer club Sporting Kansas City.

== Club career ==
=== Flamengo ===
Born in Rio de Janeiro, André Luiz began his career with Flamengo and made his professional debut for the club on 9 December 2021 in a Campeonato Brasileiro Série A match against Atlético Goianiense.

=== Estrela da Amadora ===
On 1 September 2023, recently-promoted to the Portuguese Primeira Liga side Estrela da Amadora announced the signing of André Luiz on a season-long loan from Flamengo. After impressing on his debut season in Portugal, scoring 4 goals in 28 matches, he joined the Amadora-based club on a contract until 2028.

=== Rio Ave ===
On 23 January 2025, André Luiz joined fellow Primeira Liga club Rio Ave, signing a contract until June 2029.

=== Olympiacos ===
On 29 January 2026, André Luiz joined Greek champions Olympiacos, signing a contract until June 2030.

=== Sporting Kansas City ===
On 18 August 2026, André Luiz joined Major League Soccer side Sporting Kansas City on a five-year deal for a club-record fee worth a reported $18 million.

== Career statistics ==
As of match played 7 November 2026

Appearances and goals by club, season and competition
| Club | Season | League | | | State league (Note: Includes Campeonato Carioca) | | National cup (Note: Includes Taça de Portugal) | | Continental | | Total | |
| Club | Season | Division | Apps | Goals | Apps | Goals | Apps | Goals | Apps | Goals | Apps | Goals |
|---|---|---|---|---|---|---|---|---|---|---|---|---|
| Flamengo | 2021 | Série A | 1 | 0 | 0 | 0 | 0 | 0 | 0 | 0 | 1 | 0 |
| Flamengo | 2022 | Série A | 1 | 0 | 2 | 0 | 0 | 0 | 0 | 0 | 3 | 0 |
| Flamengo | 2023 | Série A | 2 | 0 | 3 | 1 | 0 | 0 | 0 | 0 | 5 | 1 |
| Flamengo | Total | | 4 | 0 | 5 | 1 | 0 | 0 | 0 | 0 | 9 | 1 |
| Estrela da Amadora (loan) | 2023–24 | Primeira Liga | 27 | 4 | — | | 1 | 0 | — | | 28 | 4 |
| Estrela da Amadora | 2024–25 | Primeira Liga | 11 | 1 | — | | 2 | 1 | — | | 13 | 2 |
| Estrela da Amadora | Estrela total | | 38 | 5 | — | | 3 | 1 | — | | 41 | 6 |
| Rio Ave | 2024–25 | Primeira Liga | 16 | 1 | — | | 3 | 1 | — | | 19 | 2 |
| Rio Ave | 2025–26 | Primeira Liga | 19 | 7 | — | | 1 | 0 | — | | 20 | 7 |
| Rio Ave | Total | | 35 | 8 | — | | 4 | 1 | — | | 39 | 9 |
| Olympiacos | 2025–26 | Super League Greece | 8 | 0 | — | | 0 | 0 | 2 (Note: Appearances in UEFA Champions League) | 0 | 10 | 0 |
| Sporting Kansas City | 2026 | Major League Soccer | 13 | 8 | — | | — | | — | | 13 | 8 |
| Career total | | | 98 | 21 | 5 | 1 | 7 | 2 | 2 | 0 | 112 | 24 |
