= Emir Karić =

Bosnian footballer (born 1997)

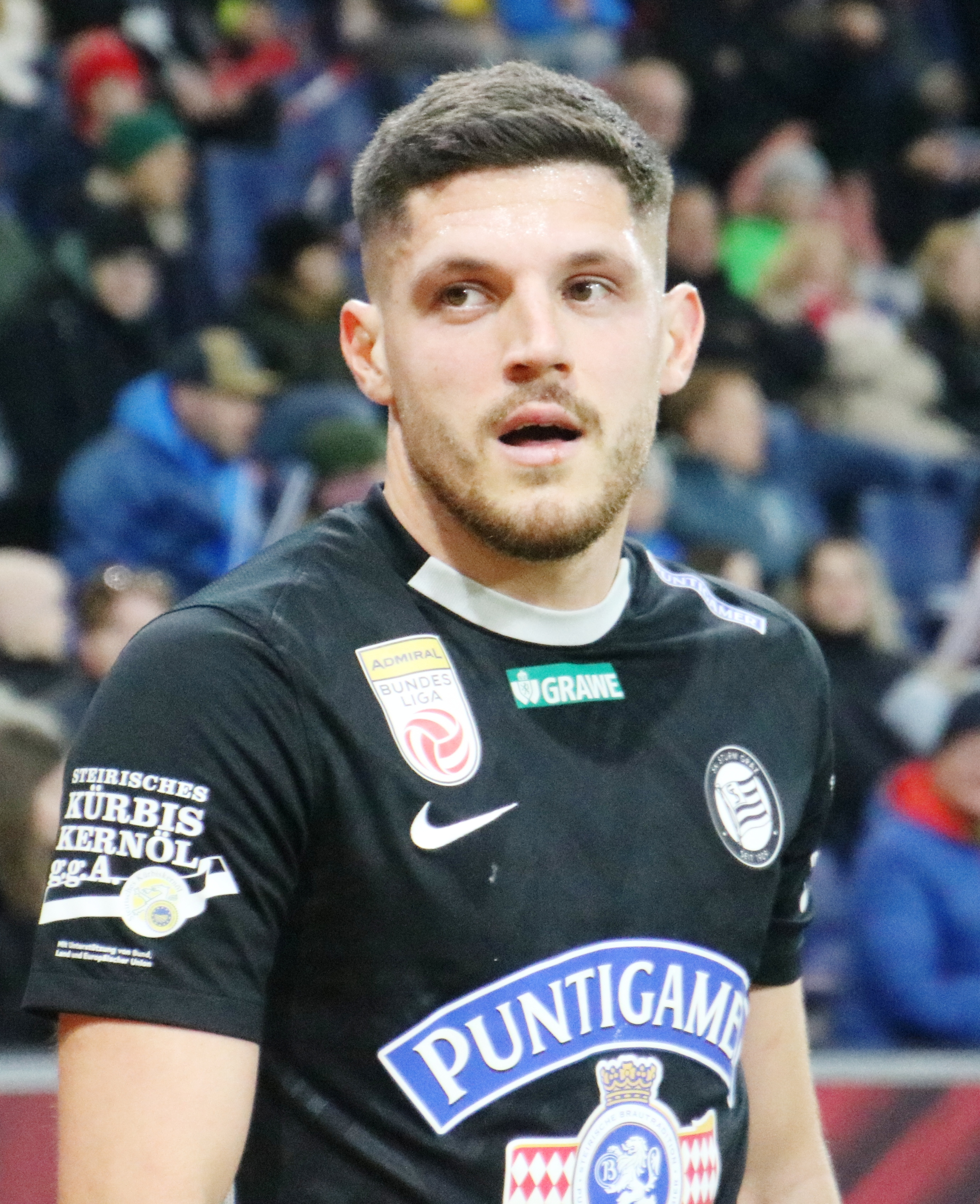
- Karić playing for Sturm Graz in 2025

Personal information
- Date of birth: 9 June 1997 (age 29)
- Place of birth: Linz, Austria
- Height: 1.84 m (6 ft 0 in)
- Position: Left-back

Team information
- Current team: Sporting Kansas City
- Number: 18

Youth career
- 2004–2005: ASKÖ Leonding
- 2005–2007: LASK
- 2007–2011: FC Pasching
- 2011–2015: LASK

Senior career*
Years	Team	Apps	(Gls)
2015	LASK	2	(0)
2015–2018	Liefering	63	(0)
2018–2021	Rheindorf Altach	75	(1)
2021–2024	SV Darmstadt	80	(4)
2024–2026	Sturm Graz	45	(0)
2026–	Sporting Kansas City	20	(0)

International career^{‡}
2015	Austria U19	1	(0)
2017–2019	Austria U21	3	(0)
2025–	Bosnia and Herzegovina	1	(0)
- * Club domestic league appearances and goals as of 8 November 2026 ‡ National team caps and goals as of 18 November 2025

Emir Karić (pronounced [ěmir kâːritɕ]; born 9 June 1997) is a professional footballer who plays as a left-back for Major League Soccer club Sporting Kansas City. Born in Austria, he plays for the Bosnia and Herzegovina national team.

Karić started his professional career at LASK, before joining Liefering in 2015. Three years later, he switched to Rheindorf Altach. In 2021, he signed with SV Darmstadt. He moved to Sturm Graz in 2024. Two years later, he joined Sporting Kansas City.

A former Austrian youth international, Karić made his senior international debut for Bosnia and Herzegovina in 2025.

== Club career ==
=== Early career ===
Karić started playing football at a local club, before joining the youth academy of his hometown team LASK in 2005. He moved to the youth setup of FC Pasching in 2007. In 2011, he returned to LASK. He made his professional debut against Wacker Innsbruck on 22 May 2015 at the age of 17.

In May, Karić signed with Liefering.

In June 2018, he switched to Rheindorf Altach. On 24 November 2019, he scored his first professional goal against Hartberg.

=== SV Darmstadt ===
In April 2021, Karić signed a three-year deal with German side SV Darmstadt. He made his official debut for the squad on 24 July against Jahn Regensburg. On 3 October, he scored his first goal for the club in a triumph over SV Sandhausen.

He was an important piece in SV Darmstadt's promotion to the Bundesliga, which was sealed on 19 May 2023.

=== Sturm Graz ===
In June 2024, Karić joined Sturm Graz on a three-year contract. He made his competitive debut for the team in an Austrian Cup game against Kremser SC on 27 July. A week later, he made his league debut against Rapid Wien. He won his first trophy with the club on 24 May, when they were crowned league champions.

=== Later stage of career ===
In June 2026, Karić moved to American outfit Sporting Kansas City.

== International career ==
Despite representing Austria at various youth levels, Karić decided to play for Bosnia and Herzegovina at the senior level.

In November 2025, his request to change sports citizenship from Austrian to Bosnian was approved by FIFA. Previously, in October, he received his first senior call up, for 2026 FIFA World Cup qualifiers against Romania and Austria. He debuted against the latter on 18 November.

== Career statistics ==
=== Club ===
As of match played 8 November 2026

Appearances and goals by club, season and competition
Club	Season	League			National cup (Note: Includes Austrian Cup, DFB-Pokal)		Continental		Other		Total	
Club	Season	Division	Apps	Goals	Apps	Goals	Apps	Goals	Apps	Goals	Apps	Goals
LASK	2014–15	2. Liga	2	0	–		–		–		2	0
Liefering	2015–16	2. Liga	12	0	–		–		–		12	0
Liefering	2016–17	2. Liga	32	0	–		–		–		32	0
Liefering	2017–18	2. Liga	19	0	0	0	–		–		19	0
Liefering	Total		63	0	0	0	–		–		63	0
Rheindorf Altach	2018–19	Austrian Bundesliga	25	0	3	0	–		–		28	0
Rheindorf Altach	2019–20	Austrian Bundesliga	27	1	2	0	–		1 (Note: Appearance in Austrian Bundesliga play-offs for UEFA Europa League)	0	30	1
Rheindorf Altach	2020–21	Austrian Bundesliga	23	0	3	0	–		–		26	0
Rheindorf Altach	Total		75	1	8	0	–		1	0	84	1
SV Darmstadt	2021–22	2. Bundesliga	26	2	1	0	–		–		27	2
SV Darmstadt	2022–23	2. Bundesliga	27	2	3	0	–		–		30	2
SV Darmstadt	2023–24	Bundesliga	27	0	1	0	–		–		28	0
SV Darmstadt	Total		80	4	5	0	–		–		85	4
Sturm Graz	2024–25	Austrian Bundesliga	15	0	3	0	0	0	–		18	0
Sturm Graz	2025–26	Austrian Bundesliga	30	0	4	0	10 (Note: Two appearances in UEFA Champions League; eight appearances in UEFA Europa League)	0	–		44	0
Sturm Graz	Total		45	0	7	0	10	0	–		62	0
Sporting Kansas City	2026	Major League Soccer	20	0	–		–		–		20	0
Sporting Kansas City	2027	Major League Soccer	0	0	0	0	–		–		0	0
Sporting Kansas City	Total		20	0	0	0	–		–		20	0
Career total			285	5	20	0	10	0	1	0	316	5

=== International ===
As of match played 18 November 2025

Appearances and goals by national team and year
National team	Year	Apps	Goals
Bosnia and Herzegovina
Bosnia and Herzegovina	2025	1	0
Total		1	0
