= Wyatt Meyer =

American soccer player (born 2001)

Personal information
- Full name: Wyatt Thomas Meyer
- Date of birth: November 12, 2001 (age 24)
- Place of birth: Berkeley, California, U.S.
- Height: 6 ft 2 in (1.88 m)
- Positions: Defender; midfielder

Team information
- Current team: Sporting Kansas City
- Number: 28

Youth career
- 2012–2020: ACC Mavericks

College career
| Years | Team | Apps | (Gls) |
| 2020–2024 | California Golden Bears | 66 | (4) |

Senior career*
| Years | Team | Apps | (Gls) |
| 2023 | Project 51O | 4 | (0) |
| 2025 | Nashville SC | 6 | (0) |
| 2025 | → Huntsville City FC (loan) | 6 | (0) |
| 2026– | Sporting Kansas City | 28 | (1) |
- * Club domestic league appearances and goals as of 02:40, November 8, 2026 (UTC)

Wyatt Thomas Meyer (born November 12, 2001) is an American professional soccer player who plays as a defender or midfielder for Major League Soccer club Sporting Kansas City.

Primarily a defender, Meyer played college soccer at the University of California, Berkeley, where he served as team captain and was named the Pac-12 Conference Defensive Player of the Year in 2023. Meyer was selected 11th overall by Nashville SC in the first round of the 2024 MLS SuperDraft. Meyer returned to college after being selected, but in 2025, signed with Nashville SC.

== Early life and education ==
Meyer was born in Berkeley, California. His mother, Jennifer Thomas, played soccer for the University of California, Berkeley, and later served as an assistant coach for the women's team. His father, Rich Meyer, played collegiate soccer and lacrosse. Meyer played youth soccer for the Albany-Berkeley Soccer Club and the ACC Mavericks.

Meyer attended St. Mary's College High School in Berkeley. He later enrolled at the University of California, Berkeley, where he majored in English with a minor in history.

== College career ==
Meyer played college soccer from 2021 to 2024 for the California Golden Bears. He made 58 appearances for the Bears, scoring four goals and recording six assists while playing as a central defender and defensive midfielder.

After the fall 2022 season, Meyer was named to the All-Pac-12 Second Team. After the fall of the 2023 season, Meyer had started in all 18 games, was named to the All-Pac-12 First Team, and was voted the Pac-12 Defensive Player of the Year, the first player in the university's history to receive the award.

In December 2023, after his third full season, Nashville SC selected Meyer with the 11th overall pick in the 2024 MLS SuperDraft. Also, in December 2023, he was selected to participate in the fourth annual MLS College Showcase. Meyer was named to the United Soccer Coaches All-Far West Region Second Team. Meyer chose to return to UC Berkeley for his fourth season in the fall of 2024, serving as Captain for a second season and earning his degree from UC Berkeley. His final season was limited to eight matches due to an injury. After the fall 2023 soccer season, Meyer was named the Pac-12 Defensive Player of the Year and selected for the All-Pac-12 First Team.

Academically, Meyer was a two-time Pac-12 All-Academic Honor Roll member. Meyer was also named a First Team Academic All-American in 2023 by College Sports Communicators, becoming the third men's soccer player in the university's program history to receive the honor.

== Club career ==
Meyer played four games with USL League Two club Project 51O, the reserve affiliate of USL Championship club Oakland Roots, in the 2023 season.

After participating in pre-season with the first team of Nashville SC ahead of the 2025 season, he signed a first-team contract on February 21. The following day, Meyer made his professional debut and played the full match in a scoreless draw against the New England Revolution on February 22. On May 21, Meyer scored his first professional goal when he scored the winning goal in a 3–1 victory over Orlando City in the U.S. Open Cup. During the 2025 season, he made six league appearances, including three starts. Meyer also made two starts and appearances in the 2025 Lamar U.S. Open Cup for Nashville SC, helping Nashville advance to the quarterfinals and ultimately win the U.S. Open Cup in October 2025. His season was interrupted by a foot injury in August 2025. After the conclusion of the season, Nashville SC declined Meyer's contract extension.

On February 3, 2026, Meyer signed a one-season contract with Major League Soccer club Sporting Kansas City with a team option for the next two seasons. Meyer made his debut for Sporting Kansas City in their season-opening match on February 21, conceding three times in a 3–0 loss to the San Jose Earthquakes. On September 19, Meyer scored his first league goal via a header from a corner kick in a 4–3 loss to the Philadelphia Union.

== Career statistics ==
=== Club ===
As of match played November 7, 2026

Appearances and goals by club, season and competition
| Club | Season | League | | | National cup (Note: Includes U.S. Open Cup) | | Continental | | Other | | Total | |
| Club | Season | Division | Apps | Goals | Apps | Goals | Apps | Goals | Apps | Goals | Apps | Goals |
|---|---|---|---|---|---|---|---|---|---|---|---|---|
| Project 51O | 2023 | USL League Two | 4 | 0 | — | | — | | — | | 4 | 0 |
| Nashville SC | 2025 | Major League Soccer | 6 | 0 | 2 | 1 | — | | — | | 8 | 1 |
| Huntsville City FC (loan) | 2025 | MLS Next Pro | 6 | 0 | — | | — | | — | | 6 | 0 |
| Sporting Kansas City | 2026 | Major League Soccer | 28 | 1 | 0 | 0 | — | | 0 | 0 | 28 | 1 |
| Career total | | | 43 | 1 | 2 | 1 | 0 | 0 | 0 | 0 | 45 | 2 |

== Honors ==
Nashville SC

- U.S. Open Cup: 2025

Individual

- Pac-12 Defensive Player of the Year: 2023
- All-Pac-12 First Team: 2023
- All-Pac-12 Second Team: 2022
