= Moisés Mosquera =

Colombian footballer (born 2001)

Personal information
- Full name: Moisés Castillo Mosquera
- Date of birth: 24 May 2001 (age 25)
- Place of birth: Medellín, Colombia
- Height: 1.88 m (6 ft 2 in)
- Position: Centre-back

Team information
- Current team: Sporting Kansas City
- Number: 3

Senior career*
Years	Team	Apps	(Gls)
2020–2021	Marítimo B	23	(0)
2022–2023	Marítimo	22	(0)
2023–2026	Juárez	78	(0)
2026–	Sporting Kansas City	0	(0)
- * Club domestic league appearances and goals as of 21:29, 2 July 2026 (UTC)

Moisés Castillo Mosquera (born 24 May 2001) is a Colombian professional footballer who plays as a centre-back for Sporting Kansas City in Major League Soccer.

== Career ==
Mosquera signed his first professional contract with Marítimo on 14 August 2020. He began his senior career with their reserves, before being sidelined by an injury in April 2021. He made his professional debut with Marítimo in a 2–1 Primeira Liga win over Portimonense on 9 January 2022.

On 8 August 2023, Marítimo announced the permanent transfer of Mosquera to Liga MX side FC Juárez, for an undisclosed fee, reported to be around €1.5 million.

On 2 July 2026, Mosquera signed with Sporting Kansas City for a fee reported to be around €3.6 million.
