= Kwaku Agyabeng =

Ghanaian footballer (born 2006)

Personal information
- Date of birth: June 27, 2006 (age 20)
- Place of birth: Kumasi, Ghana
- Height: 5 ft 8 in (1.73 m)
- Position: Central midfielder

Team information
- Current team: Sporting Kansas City
- Number: 20

Youth career
- –2025: CSA Bergen

College career
Years	Team	Apps	(Gls)
2025	Clemson Tigers	16	(1)

Senior career*
Years	Team	Apps	(Gls)
2026–	Sporting Kansas City	15	(0)
2026–	Sporting Kansas City II	1	(0)
- * Club domestic league appearances and goals as of 12 September 2026

Kwaku Agyabeng (born 27 June 2006) is a Ghanaian professional footballer who plays as a midfielder for Major League Soccer club Sporting Kansas City.

Primarily a midfielder, Agyabeng played college soccer at the Clemson University, where he was named to the ACC All-Freshman Team and Third Team All-ACC during his single season in college. Agyabeng was selected 4th overall by Sporting Kansas City in the first round of the 2026 MLS SuperDraft after signing a Generation Adidas contract with the league.

== Early life and education ==
Agyabeng was born in Kumasi, but moved to the United States and attended St. Benedict's Preparatory School in New Jersey, where he won two state titles and earned first team all-state recognition. Whilst in New Jersey, Agyabeng played with MLS Next academy side Cedar Stars, who he helped to two national titles and a spot in the MLS NEXT Cup U-19's final in 2025.

== College career ==
In 2025, Agyabeng attended Clemson University to play college soccer. During his single season with the Tigers, Agyabeng made 16 appearances, scored a single goal and tallied a single assists. He was named Third Team All-ACC and ACC All-Freshman Team in that season. On 17 December 2025, it was announced that Agyabeng had signed a Generation Adidas deal with Major League Soccer, and would enter the 2026 MLS SuperDraft.

== Club career ==
On 18 December 2025, Agyabeng was selected 4th overall in the 2026 MLS SuperDraft by Sporting Kansas City. On 21 February 2026, Agyabeng was announced as part of the first team roster for the upcoming 2026 season.
