= Jansen Miller =

American soccer player (born 2002)

Personal information
- Date of birth: February 10, 2002 (age 24)
- Place of birth: Ballwin, Missouri, U.S.
- Height: 1.90 m (6 ft 3 in)
- Position: Defender

Team information
- Current team: Sporting Kansas City
- Number: 15

College career
Years	Team	Apps	(Gls)
2020–2021	Xavier Musketeers	27	(0)
2022–2024	Indiana Hoosiers	50	(2)

Senior career*
Years	Team	Apps	(Gls)
2025–	Sporting Kansas City	41	(0)
- * Club domestic league appearances and goals

Jansen Miller (born February 10, 2002) is an American professional soccer player who plays as a defender for Major League Soccer club Sporting Kansas City.

== Career ==
=== College ===
In college, Miller played for Indiana from 2022 until 2024. He began his collegiate career in 2020, playing from 2020 until 2021 with Xavier.

At Xavier, Miller appeared in 27 games with 26 starts and was named as a Top Drawer Soccer Top 100 Freshman. Miller also earned Big East Defensive Player of the Week, Freshman of the Week, and All-Academic Team honors during his time with the Musketeers.

With Indiana, Miller was named to the 2022 NCAA College Cup Team, won a Big Ten tournament championship in 2023, and was a Big Ten regular season champion in 2023 and 2024. Individually, he was also named to the 2024 All-Big Ten Second Team.

=== Sporting Kansas City ===
Miller was selected with the No. 8 overall selection by Sporting Kansas City in the 2025 MLS SuperDraft.

Miller made his MLS debut on March 8, 2025 in a 2-1 loss to D.C. United, playing 45 minutes. He made his first MLS start on March 22, 2025, playing 90 minutes in a 2-0 loss to LAFC.
