= Sporting Kansas City =

American professional soccer club based in Kansas City metropolitan area

- Full name: Sporting Kansas City
- Nickname: Wizards
- Short name: SKC, Sporting KC, Sporting
- Founded: June 6, 1995; 31 years ago (as Kansas City Wiz)
- Stadium: Sporting Park; Kansas City, Kansas
- Capacity: 18,491
- Owner: Sporting Club
- Head coach: Vacant
- League: Major League Soccer
- 2026: Western Conference: 15th Overall: 29th Playoffs: Did not qualify
- Website: sportingkc.com
Home colors	Away colors	Third colors

Sporting Kansas City is an American professional soccer club based in the Kansas City metropolitan area. The club competes in Major League Soccer (MLS) as a member of the Western Conference. The administrative offices are located in downtown Kansas City, Missouri, and the team clubhouse and practice facilities are located in Kansas City, Kansas. The team has played its home matches at Sporting Park since 2011.

Sporting Kansas City began play in 1996 as a charter team in the league, then named Kansas City Wiz. The team was founded by Lamar Hunt in 1995. Starting in 1997, the franchise was named Kansas City Wizards. The team was forced to change its name due to corporate buyout in November 2010, coinciding with its move to its new home stadium, Sporting Park. Since moving across the state line, they have been the only major professional sports league franchise to play their home games in Kansas. The franchise has won the MLS Cup in 2000 and 2013, the Supporters' Shield in 2000, and the U.S. Open Cup in 2004, 2012, 2015, and 2017.

The club also has a reserve team, Sporting Kansas City II, that began play in the second-tier USL Championship in 2016 before switching to MLS Next Pro in 2022.

== History ==
=== Early years (1996–1999) ===
The Kansas City MLS franchise was founded by Lamar Hunt, who was also the founder of the American Football League, the Kansas City Chiefs, the United Soccer Association (which merged with the NPSL to form the North American Soccer League, or NASL), and Major League Soccer. The Kansas City Wiz played their first game on April 13, 1996, defeating the Colorado Rapids at Arrowhead Stadium with a score of 3–0. The Wiz players included Preki, Mo Johnston, Digital Takawira, and were coached by Ron Newman. The team finished third in the Western Conference (fifth overall) in the 1996 regular season with a 17–15 record, qualifying for the first-ever MLS Playoffs. In the 1996 conference semi-finals, the Wiz beat the Dallas Burn in three games, won the final game in a shootout, and lost the conference final to the LA Galaxy.

Following the 1996 season, the Wiz changed names, becoming the "Wizards," following legal action from the now-defunct electronics retailer The Wiz. For the 1997 MLS season, their record was 21–11, sufficient for the Western Conference regular season championship. Preki was named 1997 MLS MVP. In the first round of the playoffs, the Wizards lost to the last-seeded Colorado Rapids. The Wizards had losing records for the 1998 and 1999 seasons, finishing last in the Western Conference both years. The Wizards fired Ron Newman early during the 1999 season, and replaced him with Bob Gansler. The Wizards finished the 1999 season with a record of 8–24, which put them in last place in the Western Conference once again.

=== Supporters' Shield and MLS Cup (2000) ===
In 2000, their first full season under Bob Gansler, the Wizards opened the season on a 12-game unbeaten streak. Goalkeeper Tony Meola recorded an MLS record shutout streak at 681 minutes and 16 shutouts and won MLS Goalkeeper of the Year and MLS MVP. Peter Vermes was named 2000 MLS Defender of the Year. The Wizards finished the 2000 regular season 16–7–9, the best record in the league, winning the MLS Supporters' Shield.

In the 2000 playoffs, they fell behind 4 to 1 to the LA Galaxy, but Miklos Molnar scored a penalty kick in game three to send the series into a tiebreaker, where he scored again to send the Wizards to their first MLS Cup. At RFK Stadium in Washington, D.C., the Wizards, with the league's best defense, faced the team with the league's best offense, the Chicago Fire. The Wizards took the lead on an 11th-minute goal by Miklos Molnar. The Fire put ten shots on goal, but Tony Meola and the defense held, and the Wizards claimed their first MLS Cup Championship. Tony Meola was named 2000 MLS Cup MVP.

=== Post-championship struggles (2001–2002) ===
After the loss of Preki to the Miami Fusion, the team struggled to defend their championship in 2001, making the playoffs as the 8th seed with a record of 11–13–3. In the first round, the Wizards' reign as champion ended with a 6-points-to-3 loss to Preki and the Miami Fusion. Despite getting back Preki, the Wizards sat in last place in the Western Conference in 2002. They made the playoffs with a record of 9–10–9. The last two teams in the East, the MetroStars and D.C. United, missed the playoffs, which propelled the Wizards into the playoffs. In the first round, the team would fall, 6 points to 3, to eventual champions, the Los Angeles Galaxy.

=== More success (2003–2004) ===
The Wizards returned to the top half of the West in 2003 with a record of 11–10–9. In the first round of the playoffs, the Wizards defeated the Colorado Rapids in the aggregate goal series, 3–1. That set up a one-game showdown with the San Jose Earthquakes; the winner would advance to the 2003 MLS Cup. The Wizards took the lead, but the Earthquakes battled back and forced a golden goal in overtime by Landon Donovan in the 117th minute, which sent his team to the 2003 MLS Cup and the Wizards home.

The Wizards started 2004 mediocre and improved mid-year. The Wizards finished the season on a six-game unbeaten streak to finish 14–9–9 for the Western Conference regular season championship. Goalkeeper Tony Meola went down with an injury, and backup Bo Oshoniyi filled in as a replacement.

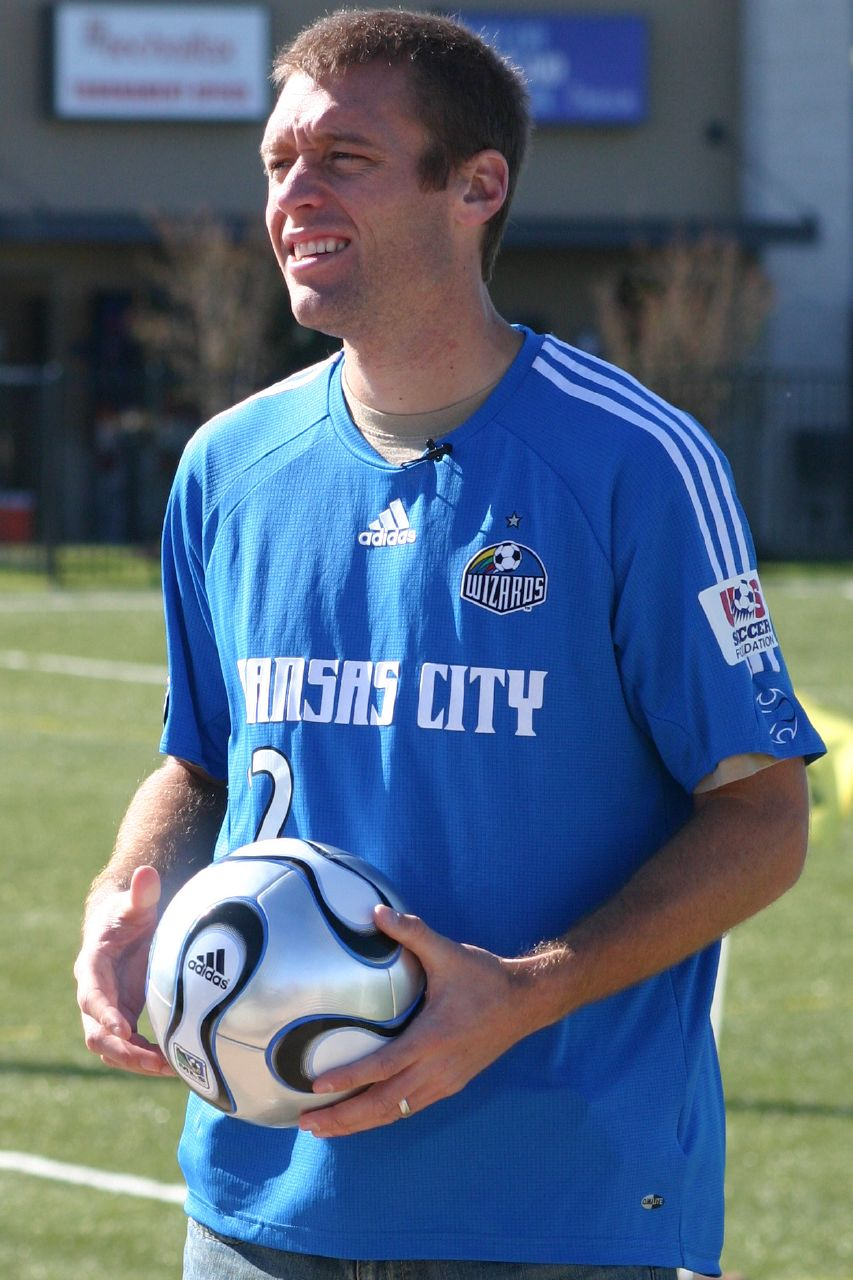
Jimmy Conrad played with Kansas City from 2003 to 2010.

In the first round of the 2004 playoffs, the Wizards lost the first game to the San Jose Earthquakes, 2–0. In the second game, however, the Wizards scored 2 goals before Jack Jewsbury scored in stoppage time to move KC onto the conference final. In the conference final, the Wizards held off the Los Angeles Galaxy to reach their second MLS Cup. In the 2004 MLS Cup final, the Wizards went up against D.C. United at the Home Depot Center in Carson, California. The Wizards' Jose Burciaga scored in the sixth minute, but D.C. United replied with three goals in the first half. KC was given a lifeline in the 58th minute as Josh Wolff scored the first penalty kick in MLS Cup history, but KC lost the 2004 MLS Cup final 3–2.

=== Move east (2005–2010) ===
Following MLS expansion, the Wizards moved to the Eastern Conference in 2005. By the end of the 2005 season, despite the solid play of 2005 MLS Defender of the Year Jimmy Conrad, the Wizards found themselves outside the playoffs with a record of 11–9–12. After the season, the team's veteran leader, Preki, announced his retirement.

In the 2006 season, the Wizards just missed out on a playoff berth with a loss to the New York Red Bulls on the final day of the regular season, finishing with a 10–14–8 record. Lamar Hunt sold the club in August 2006 to OnGoal, LLC, a six-man ownership group led by Cerner Corporation co-founders Neal Patterson and Cliff Illig, a local group committed to keeping the Wizards in Kansas City.

The club dedicated its 2007 season to Lamar Hunt, who had died in December 2006. A good start earned them four wins in the first seven weeks of the season. The club picked up goalkeeper Kevin Hartman from the LA Galaxy to help with that position. Despite winning just four games after the All-Star break, Kansas City managed to finish fifth in the East at 11–12–7 and qualify for the playoffs. The club shifted over to the West as a result of a playoff format change; the Wizards played against Chivas USA. With the Wizards Davy Arnaud's goal in the first game to win the series, the defense and Kevin Hartman did the rest and kept Chivas USA off the scoreboard. In the conference final, the Wizards came up short to the Houston Dynamo, 2–0.

In 2008, the Wizards played their home games at CommunityAmerica Ballpark in Kansas and ended a four-year playoff drought by posting an 11–10–9 record, good enough for fourth place in the Eastern Conference. Facing the Columbus Crew, the Wizards earned a 1–1 tie in Game 1 of the first-round series, but with a 2–0 loss in Game 2, the Wizards lost the aggregate series 3–1.

In the 2009 season, the Wizards remained at CommunityAmerica Ballpark but struggled to score. They went 426 minutes without scoring a goal, the longest streak of the season. In August 2009, with the team holding a 5–7–6 record, KC fired Head Coach Curt Onalfo and named general manager Peter Vermes the head coach. The Wizards finished with the worst home record in the league and, at 8–13–9, were third to last in the league standings. Top players were Claudio López (8 goals & 7 assists) and Josh Wolff (11 goals), who sparked the Wizards offense.

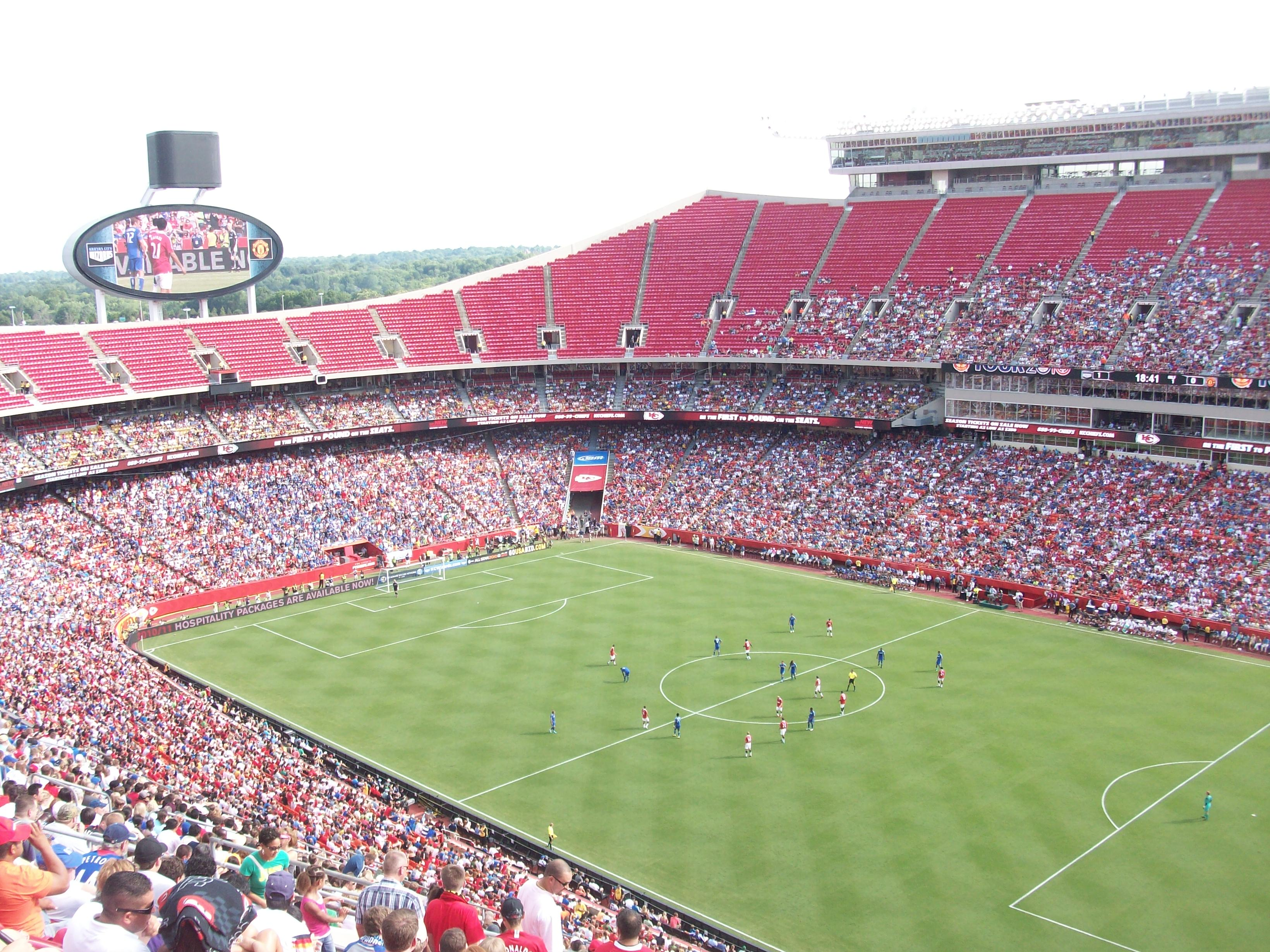
The Wizards hosting Manchester United F.C. in July 2010 at Arrowhead Stadium. This match was considered a turning point in the franchise's history, as their attendance would rapidly grow once the Sporting KC rebrand was announced, and upon the opening of their own stadium the following year.

The Wizards hosted Manchester United F.C. in a friendly on July 25, 2010, and won the match by a score of 2–1. The announced attendance of 52,342 was a record for a professional soccer match in the Kansas City area. In the 2010 regular season, the Wizards finished third in the Eastern Conference and narrowly missed qualifying for the playoffs.

=== Sporting Corporate takeover (2011–2012) ===
With the corporate takeover (of Wizards to Sporting), the team followed a recent trend in MLS of adopting European-style names, such as Toronto FC, D.C. United, and Real Salt Lake. The title "Sporting" has its origins in Iberia, where it is used only by multi-sports clubs with a history of having multiple departments fielding teams across different sports, the most notable being Portugal's Sporting CP. Kansas City's use of the term has been criticized for inaccuracy and cultural appropriation. At the rebrand announcement, Kansas City's president announced they had planned to add a rugby club and lacrosse club. Since then, a partnership with the Kansas City Blues Rugby Club has been announced, but the two sides are not part of one "Sporting Club," and no lacrosse team has been established. The rebranding was met with disdain by long term fans when originally announced. With the opening of the new Sporting Park in Kansas City, Kansas, Sporting became the first major-league team to have played in stadiums on both sides of the state line in Kansas City, while Kansas City became the only U.S. metropolitan area other than New York City to have major professional sports teams playing in different states.

Because Sporting Park was not ready for the beginning of the 2011 season, Sporting Kansas City played its first ten games on the road, only winning one game. Once the road trip was over, the team found more success and ended the regular season with the most points of any Eastern Conference team. After defeating the Colorado Rapids on a 4–0 aggregate in the Eastern Conference semifinals, Sporting lost to the Houston Dynamo 2–0 in the Eastern Conference finals.

KC began the 2012 season with seven consecutive wins, in the process setting an MLS record for 335 minutes without allowing a shot on goal. The team finished the regular season first in the East with an 18–7–9 record. KC was led by Graham Zusi, who delivered a league-leading 15 assists and was a named finalist for the 2012 MLS MVP; Jimmy Nielsen, who notched a league-leading 15 shutouts and was named the 2012 MLS Goalkeeper of the Year; and Matt Besler, who was named MLS Defender of the Year. KC lost to the Houston Dynamo in the conference semifinals. KC won the 2012 U.S. Open Cup, defeating Seattle Sounders FC in the finals, to qualify for the 2013–14 CONCACAF Champions League.

=== MLS Cup champions (2013) ===
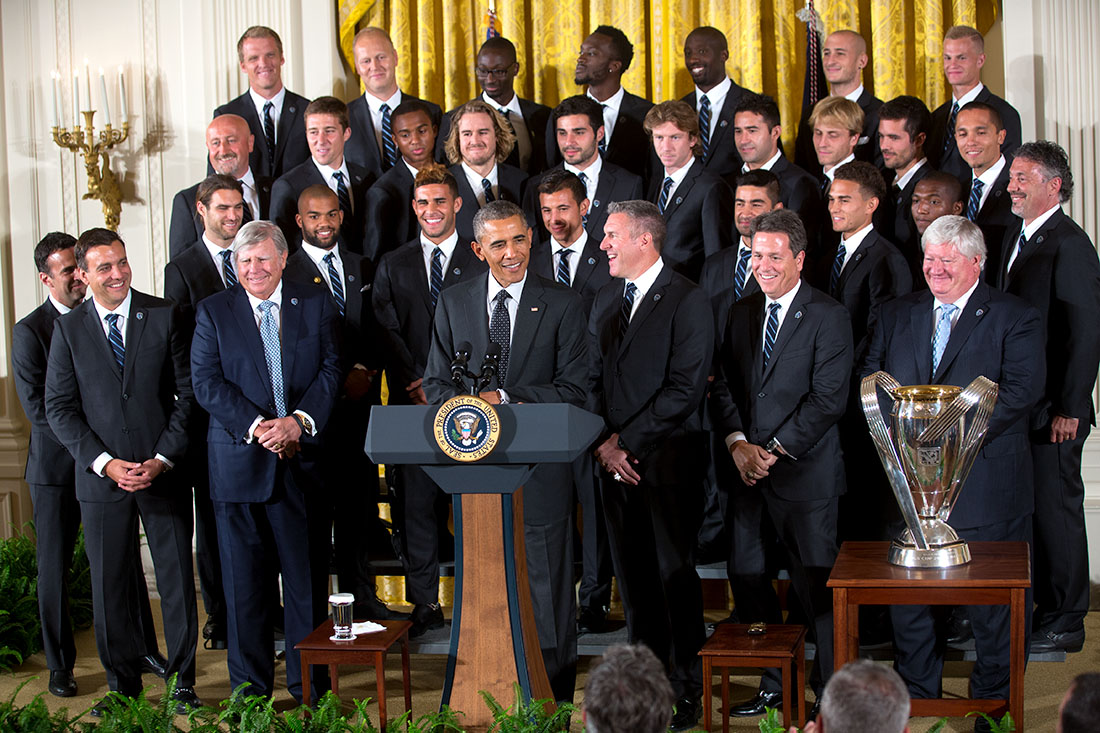
President Barack Obama honored the team and their victory in the MLS Cup 2013 in the East Room of the White House.

In 2013, Kansas City took advantage of MLS's newly created retention funds to renew contracts with U.S. national team players Graham Zusi and Matt Besler. Sporting had finished second in the Eastern Conference and overall with 17 wins, 10 losses, and 7 ties in the regular season. In the 2013 MLS Playoffs, Sporting KC defeated NE Revolution in the conference semifinals and Houston Dynamo in the conference finals, advancing to MLS Cup 2013. SKC defeated Real Salt Lake on penalties (7–6) after the match was tied 1–1 in regulation and overtime. It was the coldest MLS Cup game on record.

=== Return west (2014–present) ===
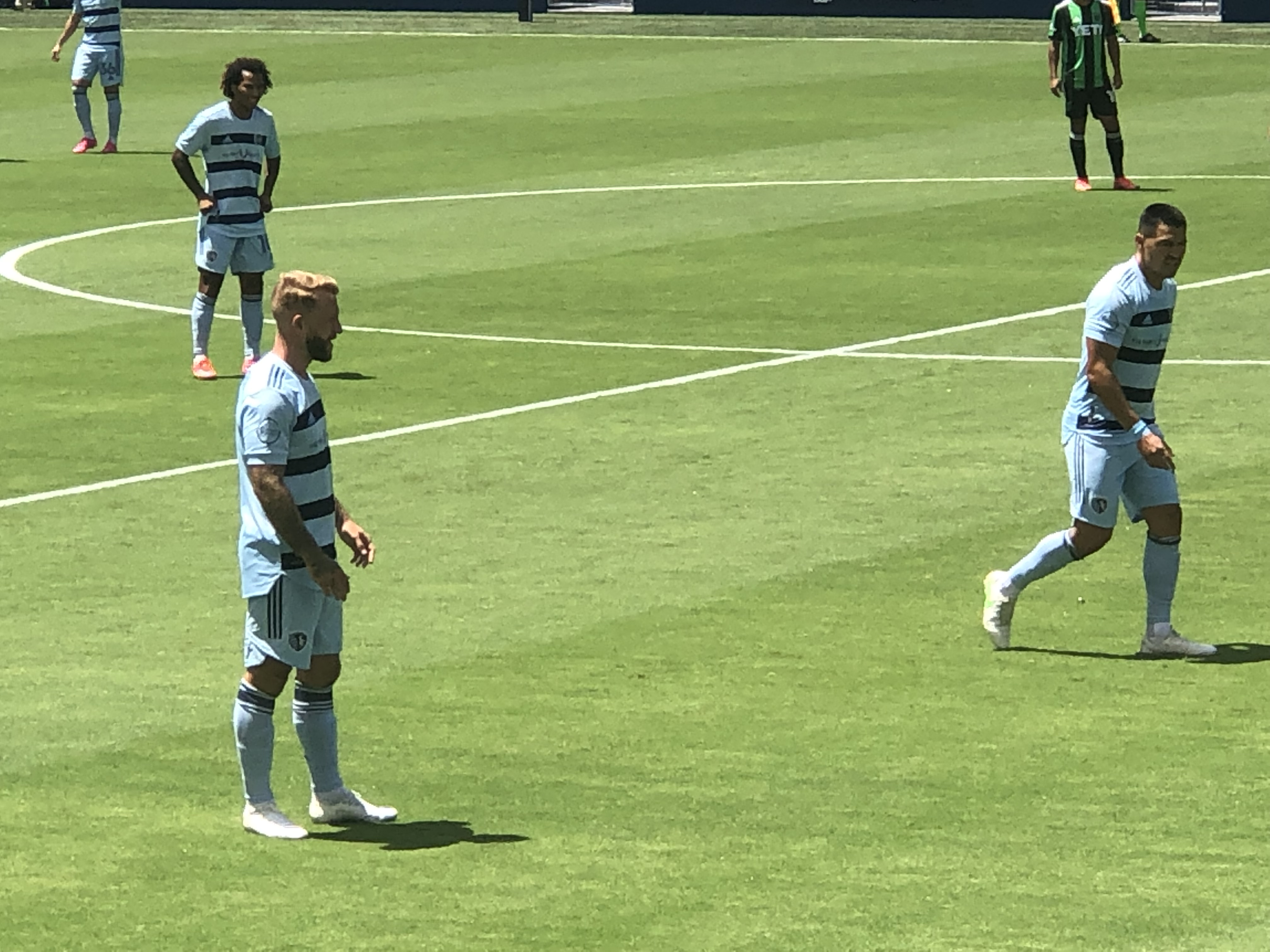
Gianluca Busio, Johnny Russell, and Roger Espinoza in 2021.

In the 2014 MLS Cup Playoffs, Sporting was eliminated in the East Knockout Round by the New York Red Bulls.

On October 27, 2014, the league announced that Sporting, along with the Houston Dynamo, would move from the Eastern Conference to the Western Conference when two teams from East Coast states, New York City FC and Orlando City SC, joined the league in 2015. Sporting finished sixth in the Western Conference that year, again qualifying for postseason play due to the expanded twelve-club field in the 2015 MLS Cup Playoffs. They were eliminated in the Western Knockout Round by the Portland Timbers, 6–7 in a penalty shootout.

Sporting's co-owner Neal Patterson died due to soft tissue cancer in July 2017. Kansas City unveiled wordmarks on the team's jerseys and on Sporting Park to commemorate their late owner. Later that month, the club traded Dom Dwyer to Orlando City in exchange for $1.6 million (in general and targeted allocation money with additional incentives), setting the record for the most expensive internal trade in league history.

The team won the 2017 Lamar Hunt U.S. Open Cup, defeating the New York Red Bulls 2–1 in the final. The win gave Sporting their fourth Open Cup title and their third in the last six years. The victory extended head coach Peter Vermes's record to 4–0 in cup finals and championship games with the club. In Open Cup history, Kansas City became just the second franchise in the single-elimination tournament to have won four Open Cup finals in the same number of appearances.

Pat Curran, one of the club's ownership partners, died in October 2024. Peter Vermes ended his 15-year tenure as the team's head coach in March 2025 after a winless start to the season.

In January 2026, minority owner and Kansas City native Peter Mallouk, owner of the wealth management firm Creative Planning, purchased a 71% stake in the club, bringing his total share up to 80% making him the majority owner. The purchase was based on a $700 million valuation of the club. The club hired Raphael Wicky as the team's next head coach in January 2026..

Under Wicky's watch, the club broke their transfer record with the signing of André Luiz from Olympiacos F.C. in August 2026. The initial fee was $18 million, with additional bonuses making the transaction as high as $22 million. Wicky was fired as head coach in November 2026 after one season, with the club conceding an MLS-record 81 goals.

== Colors and badge ==
The Wizards crest from 2006 to 2010

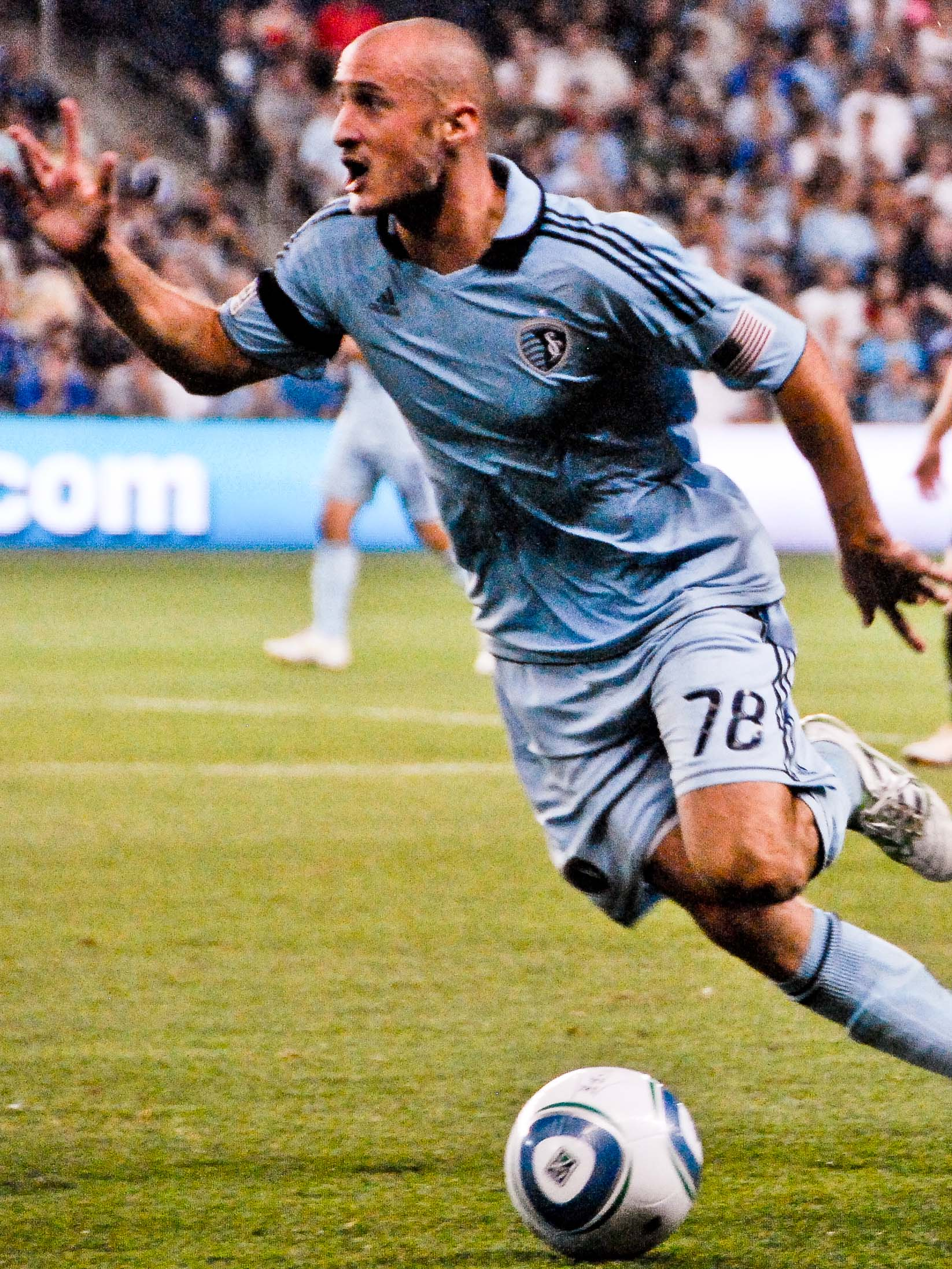
Aurélien Collin wearing Sporting's primary uniform (2011–2012)

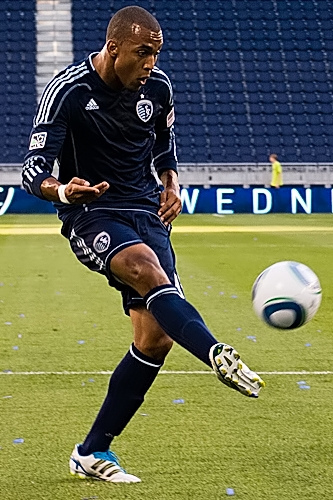
Teal Bunbury wearing Sporting's secondary uniform (2011–2013)

Sporting Kansas City's official colors are "sporting blue" and "dark indigo," with "lead" as a tertiary color. The primary logo is composed of a teardrop-shaped shield containing a stylized representation of the Kansas–Missouri state line with "sporting blue" stripes on the "Kansas" side and an interlocking "SC" on the "Missouri" side. The shield's contour alludes to the team's former logo while under the "Kansas City Wizards" appellation. The state line represents Sporting's fanbase in both of the Kansas and Missouri portions of the Kansas City metropolitan area. The eleven alternating horizontal stripes of "sporting blue" and "dark indigo" forming the state line are a nod to the number of players a team fields. The "SC" (for Sporting Club) is inspired by Asclepius' rod, representing health and fitness; a Greek statue called the Winged Victory of Samothrace, alluding to strength and movement; and the Spanish architecture of Kansas City's Country Club Plaza. Beginning in 2013, Ivy Funds became the club's first uniform sponsor, and a new home and away jersey design was unveiled, along with an alternate argyle design.

=== Sponsorship ===
Period	Kit manufacturer	Shirt sponsor	Sleeve sponsor
1996–2012	Adidas	—	
2013–2019	Adidas	Ivy Investments	—
2020	Adidas	Ivy Investments	Compass Minerals
2021	Adidas	Victory Project	Compass Minerals; Children's Mercy
2022–2025	Adidas	Compass Minerals	—
2026–present	Adidas	Compass Minerals	Saint Luke's

=== Uniform evolution ===
Home: 1996–2010

1996–1997	1998–1999	2000–2002	2003–2004	2005	2006–2007	2008–2009	2010

Home: 2011–present

2011–2012	2013–2014	2015–2016	2017–2018	2019–2020	2021–2022	2023–2024	2025–

Third

2013–2014	2015–2016	2024

== Stadiums ==
=== Arrowhead Stadium ===
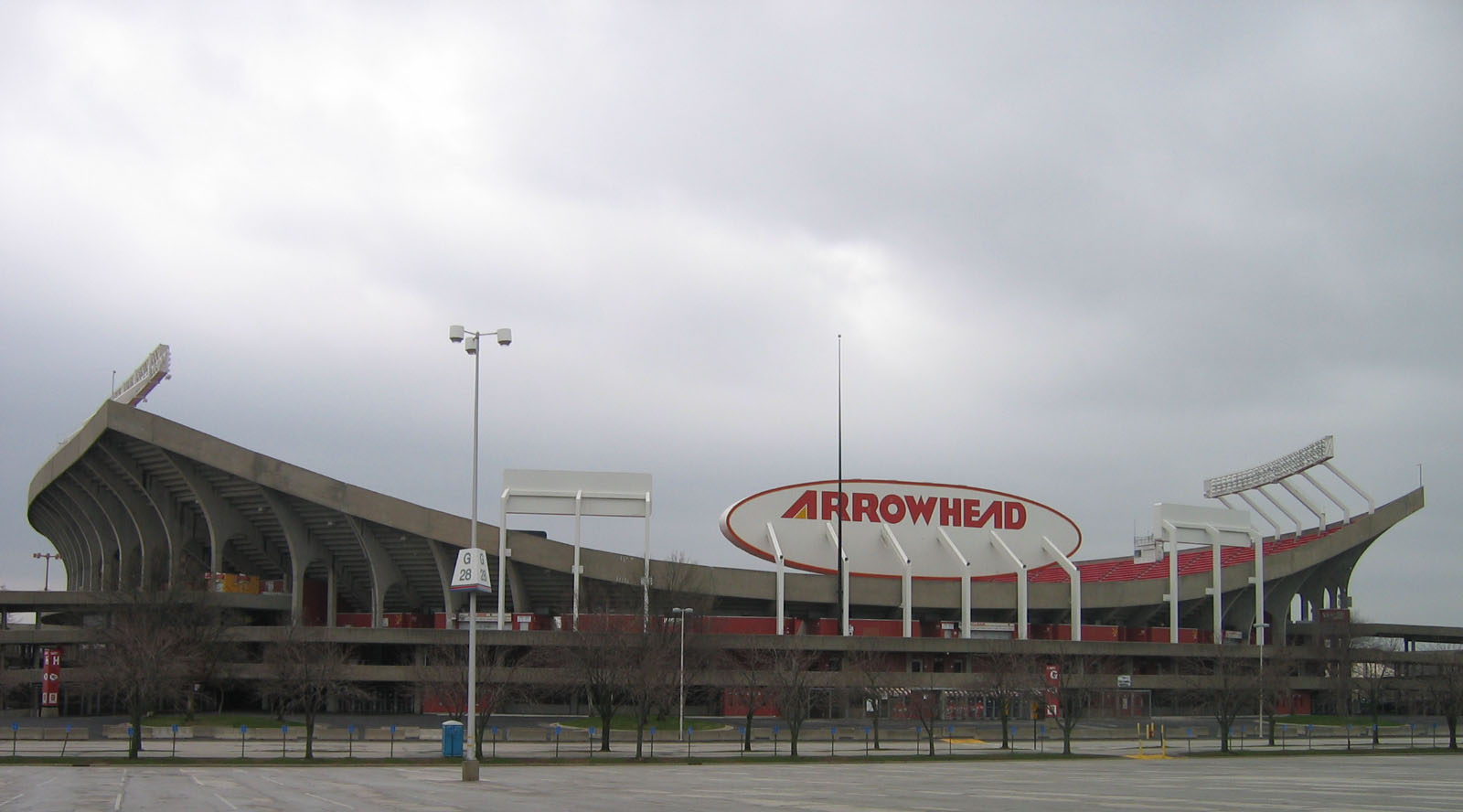
Arrowhead Stadium (here in 2007) hosted the Kansas City Wizards for over a decade.

From 1996 through 2007, the Wizards played home games in Arrowhead Stadium, the American football stadium mainly used by the Kansas City Chiefs. Wizards management kept the west end of Arrowhead tarped off for the first 10 years of play, limiting seating near the field. In 2006, fans could sit all the way around the field, but, in 2007, seating was [again] only available along the sidelines. After the 2007 final season at Arrowhead, the Wizards continued to use the stadium for select large events. In 2008, the club played a regular season home game against the Los Angeles Galaxy at the stadium to accommodate the large crowd expected for David Beckham's Galaxy debut. Again in 2010, the Wizards played a friendly here against English club Manchester United, winning 2–1. Once again the club had to use the stadium for their game against Inter Miami to accommodate the large crowd for Lionel Messi's first appearance in Kansas City. Inter Miami won the game 3–2.

=== CommunityAmerica Ballpark ===
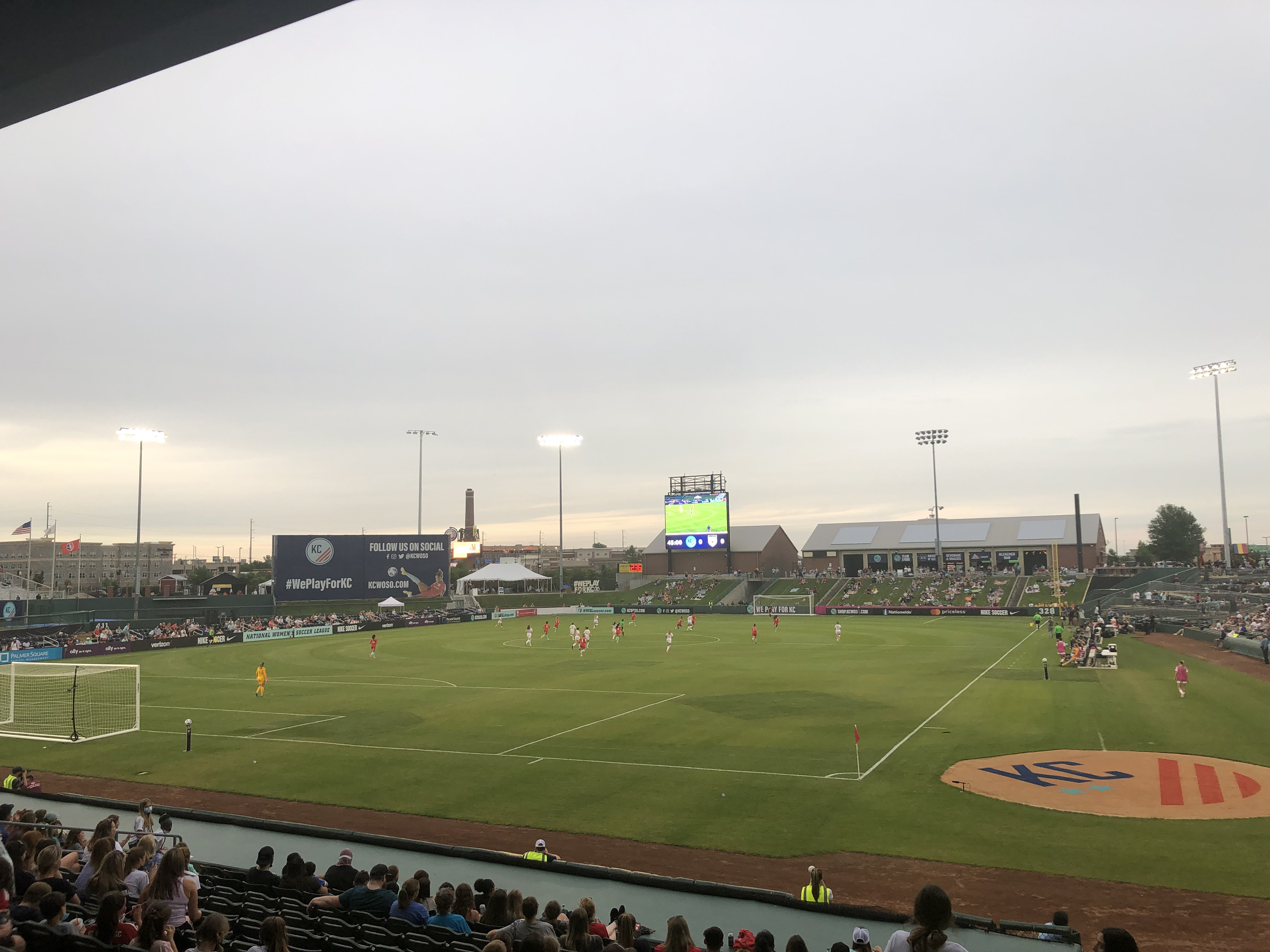
CommunityAmerica Ballpark was the home stadium of the Kansas City Wizards before they moved to Sporting Park.

The Wizards entered an agreement with the Kansas City T-Bones to use their home stadium, CommunityAmerica Ballpark, during the 2008 and 2009 seasons. The deal was later extended to include 2010. The stadium, located across the state line in Kansas City, Kansas, built a new bleacher section financed by the Wizards to increase its capacity to 10,385. This move made the Wizards the third MLS team to share their home ground with a baseball team. D.C. United had been sharing RFK Stadium with Major League Baseball's Washington Nationals in Washington, D.C., before the latter's move into Nationals Park. The San Jose Earthquakes used Oakland–Alameda County Coliseum in Oakland, home of the Oakland A's (and Oakland Raiders), for certain games during the 2008 and 2009 seasons.

The Wizards originally planned to return to Kansas City, Missouri, and build a new stadium there – tentatively called Trails Stadium–as part of a major mixed-use development. The team had received all required approvals and was awaiting site demolition; however, the 2008–09 financial crisis ultimately led to the scrapping of the Trails Stadium project.

=== Sporting Park ===
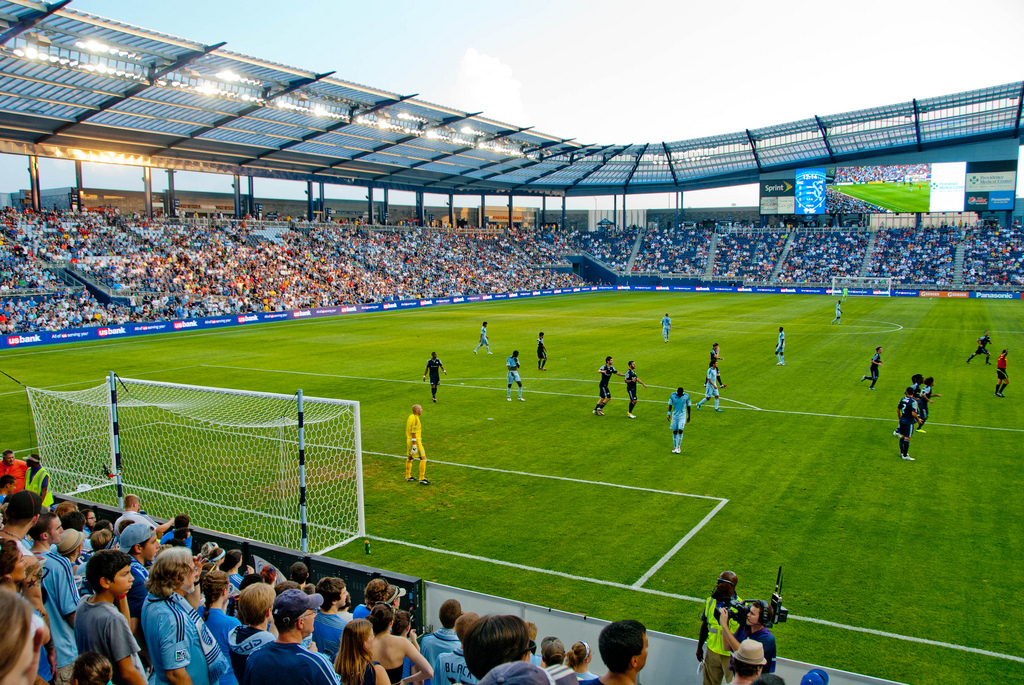
View from The Cauldron, the club's main supporter's group section

The team sought a new site for its stadium, quickly settling on a development in Kansas City, Kansas, known as Village West, near CommunityAmerica Ballpark and the Kansas Speedway. In September 2009, the developer asked Wyandotte County (in Kansas) and Kansas state officials for permission to use revenues from existing tax increment financing in the Village West area to help finance the soccer complex. On December 17, Wizards president Robb Heineman provided an update on the stadium situation, identifying the Kansas City, Kansas, location as near final, pending the signature of the final agreements. On January 19, 2010, Wyandotte County approved the bonds to help finance the stadium, and on January 20 the groundbreaking ceremony was held, with Wizards CEO Robb Heineman using heavy machinery to move dirt on the construction site.

When the Kansas City Wizards first rebranded as Sporting Kansas City, they built Livestrong Sporting Park. Spending $200 million on the complex, it was the first "European-style" soccer complex in the United States. Name rights were held by the Livestrong Foundation until the downfall of Lance Armstrong from his doping scandal; Sporting Kansas City subsequently changed the name of their stadium to Sporting Park.

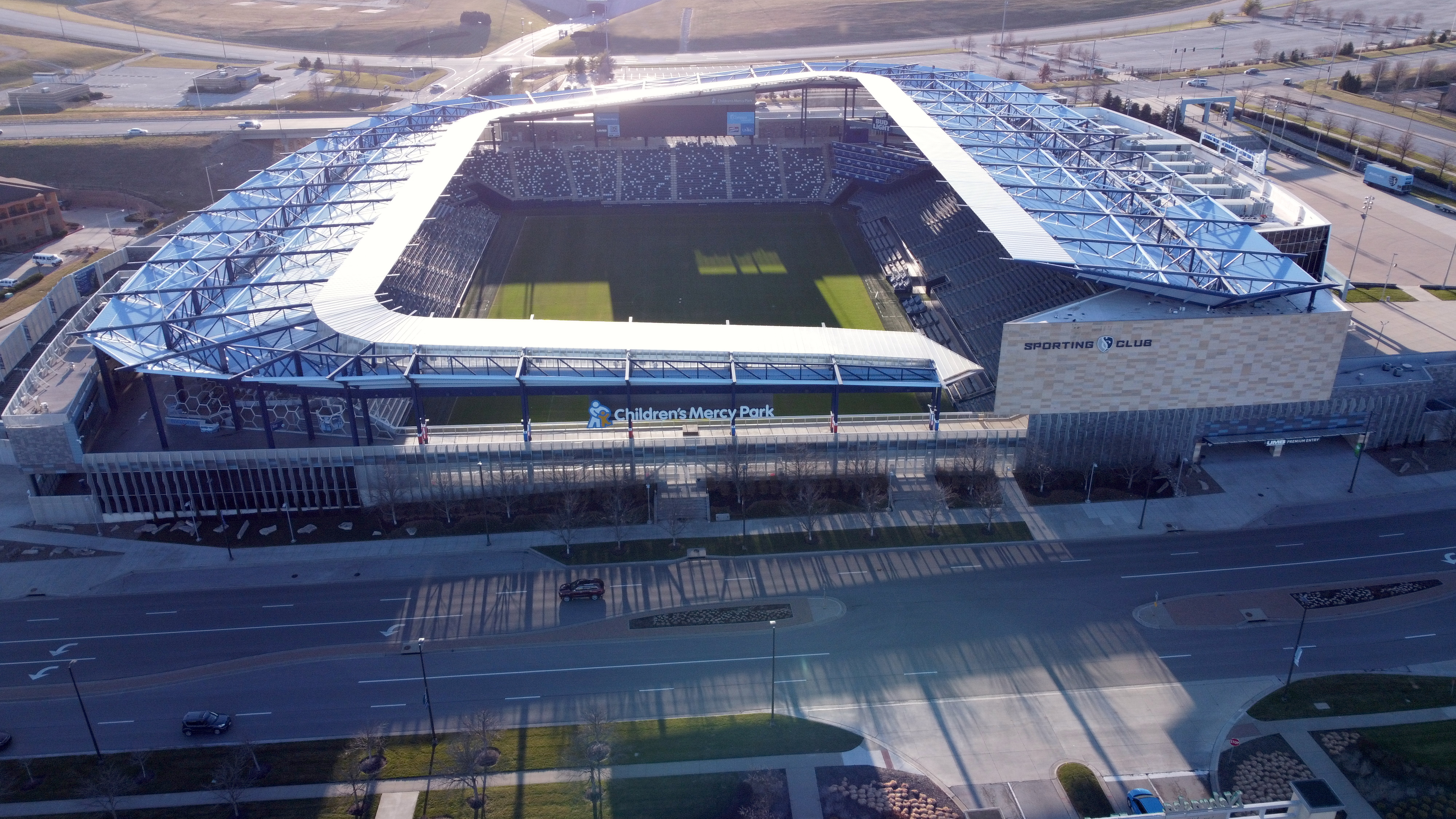
Sporting Park has been the club's home stadium since 2011.

On November 19, 2015, the stadium was renamed to Children's Mercy Park in a ten-year deal with Children's Mercy Hospital.

Name	Location	Years in use
Arrowhead Stadium	Kansas City, Missouri	1996–2007
CommunityAmerica Ballpark	Kansas City, Kansas	2008–2010
Sporting Park	Kansas City, Kansas	2011–present

Previous stadiums:

- Blue Valley Sports Complex; Overland Park, Kansas (2001, 2004, 2006, 2011); 6 games in Lamar Hunt U.S. Open Cup
- Julian Field; Parkville, Missouri (2005); 2 games in Lamar Hunt U.S. Open Cup
- Hermann Stadium; St. Louis, Missouri (2009) 1 game in North American SuperLiga
- Durwood Soccer Stadium; Kansas City, Missouri (2010) 1 game in Lamar Hunt U.S. Open Cup

== Club culture ==
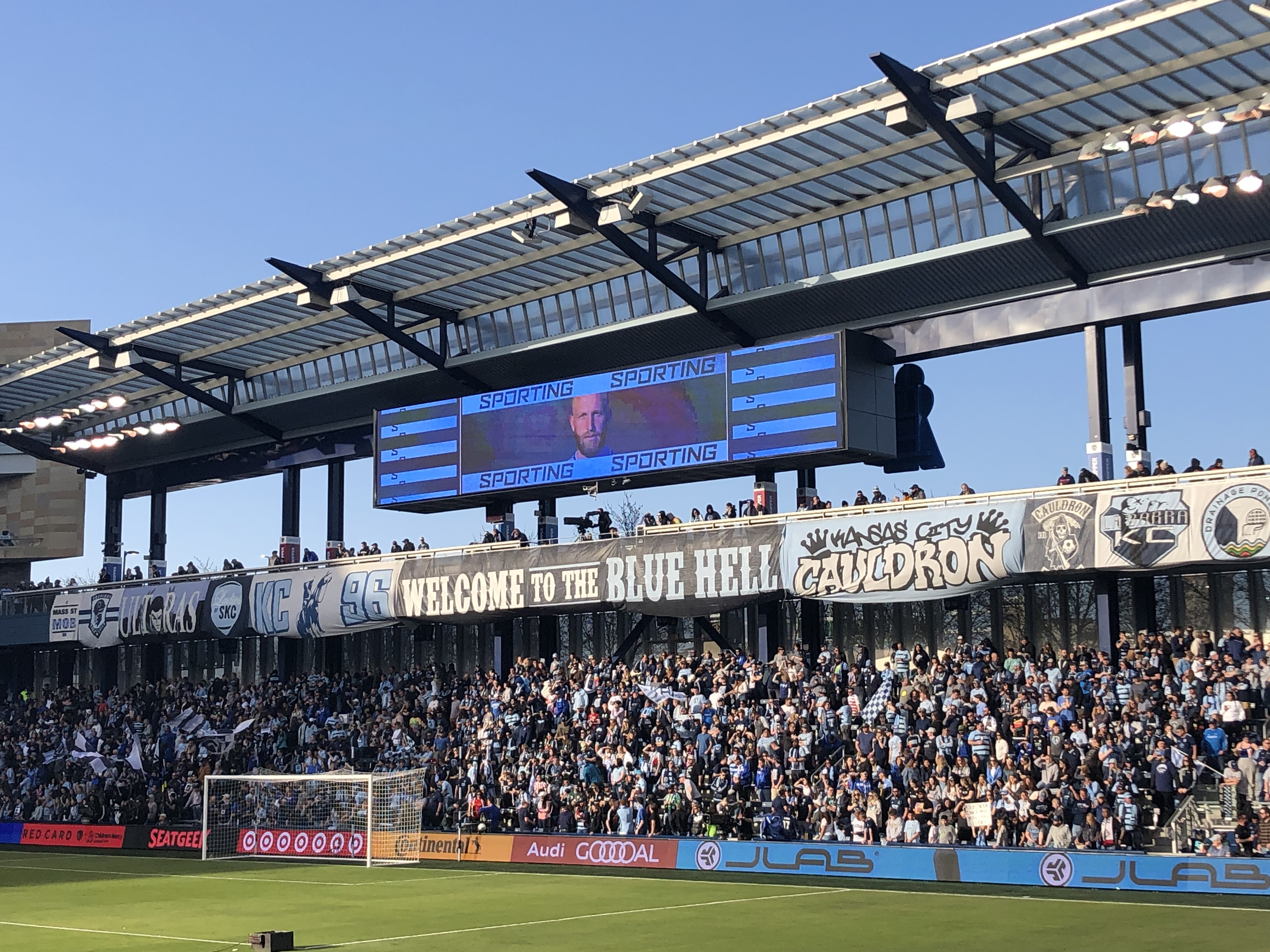
The primary supporters' section is "The Cauldron" at Sporting Park.

=== Supporters ===
Sporting regularly sold out its matches, with over 100 straight sellouts as of August 2017. Sporting has 14,000 season-ticket holders, with a wait list for season tickets of 3,000 people. Sporting KC has a relatively young fan base, with season-ticket holders having an average age of 29.7 years. Sporting KC works with Sporting Innovations, a consulting firm spun off from the team that focuses on fan engagement. Administrators from several college football teams, such as the Florida Gators, have visited Sporting KC to learn from the team's success at fan engagement.

The main supporters group of Sporting Kansas City cheers in the Members' Stand on the north side of Sporting Park and is known as "The Cauldron." The name is derived from the large metal pots used for boiling potions, due to the team's proper name, Wizards. Since the rebranding in 2010, Sporting has seen dramatic growth in their fan section, with several fan groups adding their voice to The Cauldron culture and atmosphere.

Current groups in the north stands along with The Cauldron include, Drainage Pond SC, La Barra KC, Mahaffie Marauders, and Off to See the Wizards

The South Stand SC cheers from the south end of Sporting Park and is the umbrella group for The Wedge and Ad Astra SKC (a reference to the motto of the state of Kansas), while American Outlaws–Kansas City Chapter is also present in the stands.

=== Mascot ===
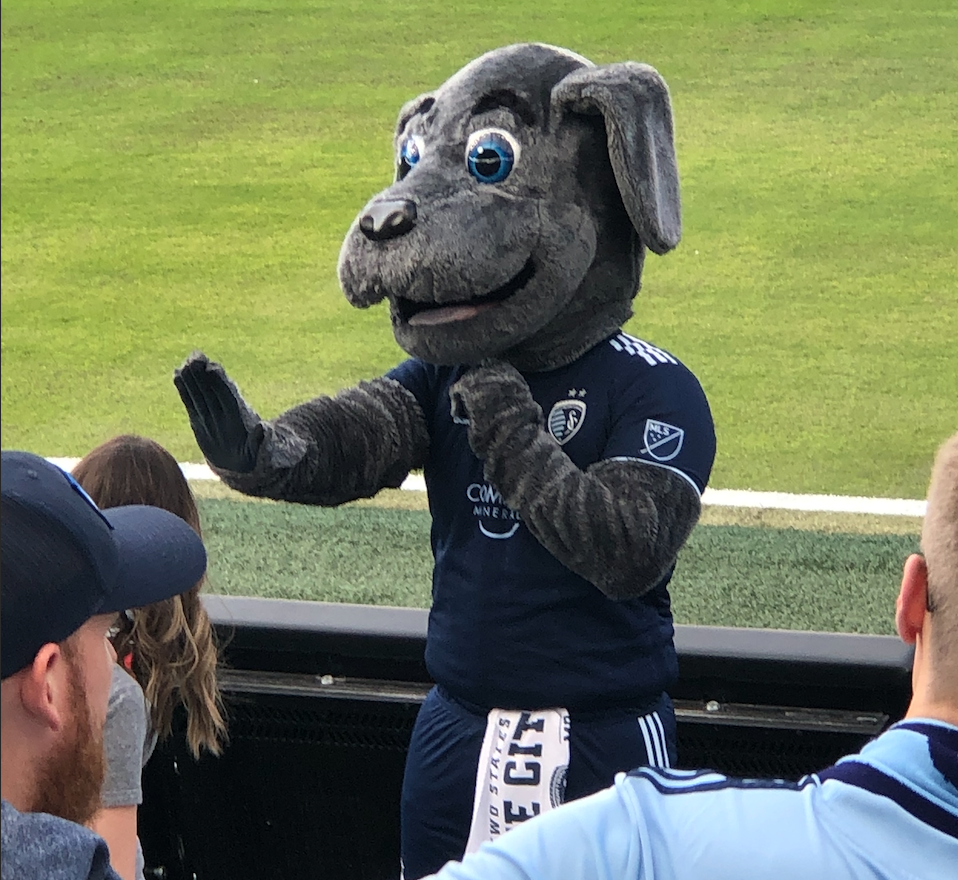
Blue is the franchise's mascot.

Blue the Dog is the franchise's official mascot.

=== Rivalries ===
==== Houston Dynamo ====
The two teams had faced each other regularly over the years, while both had been members of the Eastern Conference. During that time, Sporting KC had frequently faced Houston in the playoffs, beginning their rivalry. As of 2022, SKC is 18–18–16 (W–L–T) against the Dynamo.

==== Real Salt Lake ====
In their total meetings, Sporting KC is 17–19–12 (W–L–T) (as of October 2023). The two teams faced each other in MLS Cup 2013, in what was the coldest MLS Cup final at that time.

==== Portland Timbers ====
In recent years, the metro areas of Portland and Kansas City have both become major soccer markets due to the performance of their respective soccer teams. Additionally, their NWSL teams, the Portland Thorns and the Kansas City Current, have become major rivals, especially since the Thorns' 2–0 win over the Current in the 2022 NWSL Championship.

==== St. Louis City SC ====
Sporting KC began a rivalry with St. Louis City SC starting with the team's entrance into the league in the 2023 season. Prior to the first meeting, a St. Louis fan podcast, the Soccer Capitol Podcast, became the center of attention, heightening tensions between supporters. A series of emails from Sporting Kansas City's front office arrived in the inbox of the podcast's Gmail account. The club believed the Soccer Capital Podcast was infringing on the trademark "The Soccer Capital of America," which was registered to Kansas Training Partners LLC, an affiliate company of Sporting Kansas City. St. Louis City won the first meeting at CityPark in May 2023, but Sporting KC won the second meeting, which took place at Sporting Park the following September. The two teams played in their first postseason matchup in the 2023 MLS Cup playoffs, with Sporting Kansas City (the #8 seed) upsetting the #1 seeded St. Louis in a best-of-three series.

== Broadcasting ==
From 2023, every Sporting Kansas City match is available via MLS Season Pass on the Apple TV app.

Prior to 2017, matches were broadcast in high definition on KMCI-TV (except for nationally broadcast matches). The play-by-play announcer was WHB 810AM 'Border Patrol' host Nate Bukaty, who began broadcasting for the team in the 2015 season. Former Sporting Kansas City goalkeeper Andy Gruenebaum provided color commentary following his retirement after the 2014 season. Color commentary was covered by Jake Yadrich through the 2013 season, after which he transitioned to be the lead analyst on the sidelines during games. Morning reporter Kacie McDonnell of KSHB-TV, an NBC affiliate and KMCI-TV's sister station, served as the network host of the pregame and postgame shows.

In addition, the Sporting Kansas City Television Network provided coverage across markets in six states:

- Mediacom 22 throughout Kansas, Missouri, and Iowa
- KZOU in Columbia, Missouri
- The Cox Channel in Northwest Arkansas, Topeka, Kansas, Wichita, Kansas, Omaha, Nebraska, Oklahoma City, and Tulsa, Oklahoma
- LAKE-TV Channel 32 in the Lake of the Ozarks

Matches that are not broadcast nationally were broadcast on Fox Sports Kansas City (it was also carried on Fox Sports Midwest in the St. Louis market until 2023, when it was removed due to the founding of St. Louis City SC). In 2017, Fox Sports Midwest only carried select matches, while in 2018, the club announced the St. Louis market would receive all matches, while the Mid-Missouri and Iowa markets would receive most matches. Nate Bukaty continues to provide the play-by-play commentary, while Jacob Peterson joined as the color commentator ahead of the 2020 season, with Carter Augustine returning as the sideline reporter.

In 2022, prior to an upcoming leaguewide TV deal, KMCI returned as broadcast partner for those in the Kansas City market, with other areas being able to stream all matches on the club's website.

Regular local radio coverage in English is provided through an official partnership with Sports Radio 810 WHB and its affiliate ESPN Kansas City 99.3 FM. Spanish broadcasting was previously found on KDTD 1340 AM, but is on KCZZ (ESPN Deportes Kansas City 1480AM) for the 2018 season. The broadcasts are produced by Jorge Moreno and feature the voice of 13-year MLS veteran Diego Gutierrez along with Ale Cabero, Raul Villegas, and Alonso Cadena.

== Players and staff ==
=== Roster ===
As of September 12, 2026

Note: Flags indicate national team as defined under FIFA eligibility rules; some limited exceptions apply. Players may hold more than one non-FIFA nationality.

No.	Pos.	Nation	Player
1	GK	USA	John Pulskamp
2	DF	USA	Ian James
3	DF	COL	Moisés Mosquera
4	MF	NOR	Lasse Berg Johnsen
5	DF	ISR	Or Blorian
7	FW	ANG	Capita
8	DF	USA	Jake Davis
11	FW	BRA	André Luiz
12	GK	USA	Jack Kortkamp
13	DF	USA	Justin Reynolds
14	FW	ENG	Calvin Harris
15	DF	USA	Jansen Miller
16	MF	USA	Jacob Bartlett

No.	Pos.	Nation	Player
17	FW	CAN	Stephen Afrifa
18	DF	BIH	Emir Karić
19	FW	USA	Taylor Calheira
20	MF	GHA	Kwaku Agyabeng
22	DF	CAN	Zorhan Bassong
24	MF	USA	Rubén Ramos Jr. (on loan from LA Galaxy)
28	DF	USA	Wyatt Meyer
29	FW	JAM	Seymour Reid (on loan from New York City FC)
30	GK	USA	Stefan Cleveland
33	MF	USA	Owen Wolff
57	DF	BRA	Diego Borges
93	FW	RUS	Shapi Suleymanov
99	DF	USA	Jayden Reid

=== Out on loan ===
Note: Flags indicate national team as defined under FIFA eligibility rules; some limited exceptions apply. Players may hold more than one non-FIFA nationality.

No.	Pos.	Nation	Player
23	DF	USA	Ethan Bartlow (on loan to Tampa Bay Rowdies)
36	GK	USA	Ryan Schewe (on loan to Louisville City)
—	MF	USA	Cielo Tschantret (on loan to Lexington SC)

=== Technical staff ===
Role	Name	Nationality
Sporting Director	Mike Burns	United States
Head coach	Vacant	
Assistant Coach	Vacant	
Assistant Coach	Dominic Kinnear	United States
Assistant Coach	Roger Espinoza	Honduras
Assistant Coach	Vaccant	
Goalkeeper Coach	Darrin MacLeod	Canada

=== Head coaches ===
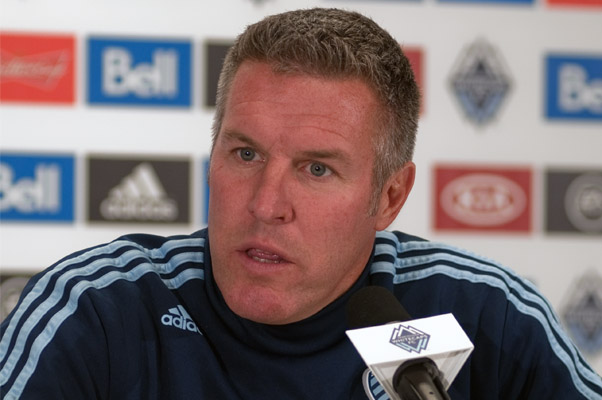
Peter Vermes was the first person to win MLS Cup with the same club as player (2000) and later as head coach (2013).

Name	Nation	Tenure
Ron Newman	(England)	October 11, 1995 – April 14, 1999
Ken Fogarty (interim)	(England) (United States)	April 14, 1999 – April 28, 1999
Bob Gansler	(United States)	April 28, 1999 – July 19, 2006
Brian Bliss (interim)	(United States)	July 19, 2006 – December 31, 2006
Curt Onalfo	(United States)	November 27, 2006 – August 3, 2009
Peter Vermes	(United States)	August 4, 2009 – November 10, 2009 (interim); November 10, 2009 – March 31, 2025
Kerry Zavagnin (interim)	(United States)	March 31, 2025 – December 2, 2025 (interim)
Raphaël Wicky	(Switzerland)	January 5, 2026 – November 9, 2026

=== General managers and presidents ===
Name	Tenure
Tim Latta	1996
Doug Newman	1997–1999
Curt Johnson	1999–2006
Robb Heineman	2006–2016
Jake Reid	2016–present

== Honors ==
Domestic
Competitions	Titles	Seasons
MLS Cup	2	2000, 2013
Supporters' Shield	1	2000
U.S. Open Cup	4	2004, 2012, 2015, 2017
Eastern Conference (Playoff)	1	2013
Eastern Conference (Regular Season)	2	2011, 2012
Western Conference (Playoff)	1	2004
Western Conference (Regular Season)	5	1997, 2000, 2004, 2018, 2020

=== Awards ===
- MLS Fair Play Award: 1998, 2002, 2005, 2006
- CONCACAF Champions League Fair Play Award: 2019

== Team record ==
=== Seasons ===
This is a partial list of the most recent seasons completed by SKC. For the full season-by-season history, see List of Sporting Kansas City seasons.

Season	League											Position		Playoffs	USOC	Continental / Other		Average attendance	Top goalscorer(s)	
Season	Div	League	Pld	W	L	D	GF	GA	GD	Pts	PPG	Conf.	Overall	Playoffs	USOC	Continental / Other		Average attendance	Name(s)	Goals
2017	1	MLS	34	12	9	13	40	29	+11	49	1.44	5th	11th	R1	W	DNQ		19,565	(Guinea-Bissau) Gerso Fernandes	8
2018	1	MLS	34	18	8	8	65	40	+25	62	1.82	1st	3rd	SF	QF	DNQ		19,774	(Hungary) Dániel Sallói	14
2019	1	MLS	34	10	16	8	49	67	–18	38	1.12	11th	21st	DNQ	R4	CONCACAF Champions League	SF	18,601	(Chile) Felipe Gutiérrez	12
2020	1	MLS	21	12	6	3	38	25	+13	39	1.86	1st	5th	QF	NH	MLS is Back tournament	QF	21,188	(Mexico) Alan Pulido	6
2021	1	MLS	34	17	7	10	58	40	+18	58	1.7	3rd	4th	SF	NH	DNQ		18,757	(Hungary) Dániel Sallói	16
2022	1	MLS	34	11	16	7	42	54	-12	40	1.18	12th	23rd	DNQ	SF	DNQ		18,365	(Scotland) Johnny Russell	8
2023	1	MLS	34	12	14	8	48	51	-3	44	1.29	8th	15th	SF	R4	DNQ		18.616	(Mexico) Alan Pulido	14
2024	1	MLS	34	8	19	7	51	66	-15	31	0.91	13th	27th	DNQ	RU	DNQ		21,193	(Nigeria) Willam Agada	10

1. Avg. attendance include statistics from league matches only.
2. Top goalscorer(s) includes all goals scored in league, MLS Cup playoffs, U.S. Open Cup, MLS is Back tournament, CONCACAF Champions League, FIFA Club World Cup, and other competitive continental matches.

=== International tournaments ===
- 2001 Copa Merconorte

Group stage v. (Peru) Sporting Cristal: 1–2
Group stage v. (Mexico) Santos Laguna: 2–4
Group stage v. (Ecuador) Barcelona: 3–2
Group stage v. (Peru) Sporting Cristal: 1–2
Group stage v. (Ecuador) Barcelona: 1–1
Group stage v. (Mexico) Santos Laguna: 0–1

- 2002 CONCACAF Champions Cup

First Round v. (Trinidad and Tobago) W Connection: 1–0, 2–0 (Wizards win 3–0 on aggregate)
Quarterfinal v. (Mexico) Santos Laguna: 1–2, 2–0 (Wizards win 3–2 on aggregate)
Semifinals v. (Mexico) Monarcas Morelia: 1–6, 1–1 (Morelia advance 7–2 on aggregate)

- 2005 CONCACAF Champions Cup

First Round v. (Costa Rica) Deportivo Saprissa: 0–0, 1–2 (Saprissa advance 2–1 on aggregate after added extra time)

- 2009 North American SuperLiga

Group stage v. (Mexico) Atlas: 0–0
Group stage v. (United States) New England Revolution: 1–1
Group stage v. (Mexico) Santos Laguna: 1–3

- 2013–14 CONCACAF Champions League

Group stage v. (Nicaragua) Real Estelí: 2–0, 1–1
Group stage v. (Honduras) Olimpia: 2–0, 0–0
Quarterfinals v. (Mexico) Cruz Azul: 1–0, 1–5 (Cruz Azul advance 5–2 on aggregate)

- 2014–15 CONCACAF Champions League

Group stage v. (Nicaragua) Real Estelí: 1–1, 3–0
Group stage v. (Costa Rica) Deportivo Saprissa: 3–1, 0–2

- 2016–17 CONCACAF Champions League

Group stage v. (Trinidad and Tobago) Central FC: 2–2, 3–1
Group stage v. (Canada) Vancouver Whitecaps FC: 3–0, 1–2

- 2019 CONCACAF Champions League

Round of 16 v. (Mexico) Toluca: 3–0, 2–0 (Sporting KC advance 5–0 on aggregate)
Quarterfinals v. (Panama) Independiente: 1–2, 3–0 (Sporting KC advance 4–2 on aggregate)
Semifinals v. (Mexico) Monterrey 0–5, 2–5 (Monterrey advance 10–2 on aggregate)

== Player records ==
=== Top goalscorers ===
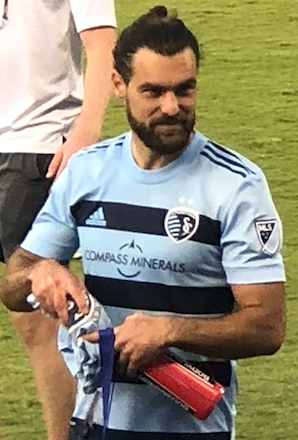
Graham Zusi is the longest-tenured player to have played with one club in MLS history

As of September 10, 2023

#	Name	Career	MLS	Playoffs	Open Cup	CCL	Total
1	(United States) Preki	1996–2000; 2002–2005	71	8	1	1	81
2	(Scotland) Johnny Russell	2018–2024	60	1	5	1	67
3	(Hungary) Dániel Sallói	2017–present	54	5	8	0	67
4	(United States) Dom Dwyer	2012–2017	57	2	6	2	67
5	(United States) Davy Arnaud	2002–2011	43	4	5	0	52
6	(United States) Josh Wolff	2003–2006; 2008–2010	43	1	2	0	46
7	(United States) Chris Klein	1998–2005	39	3	1	0	43
8	(Sierra Leone) Kei Kamara	2009–2013	38	0	3	0	41
9	(Mexico) Alan Pulido	2020–2024	35	0	2	0	37
10	(United States) Graham Zusi	2009–2023	31	1	3	0	35
11	(Scotland) Mo Johnston	1996–2001	31	1	0	0	32
11	(United States) Benny Feilhaber	2013–2017; 2019	29	0	2	1	32
13	(Zimbabwe) Vitalis Takawira	1996–2000	28	2	1	0	31
14	(Trinidad and Tobago) Scott Sealy	2005–2008	28	0	2	0	30

The following records are for MLS regular season only:

- Games: Graham Zusi (355)
- Goals: Preki (71)
- Match-Winning Goals: Dániel Sallói (17)
- Assists: Preki (98)
- Wins: Tim Melia (73)
- Shutouts: Tim Melia (52)
- Saves Tim Melia (530)
- Ejections: Roger Espinoza (11)

=== Sporting Legends ===
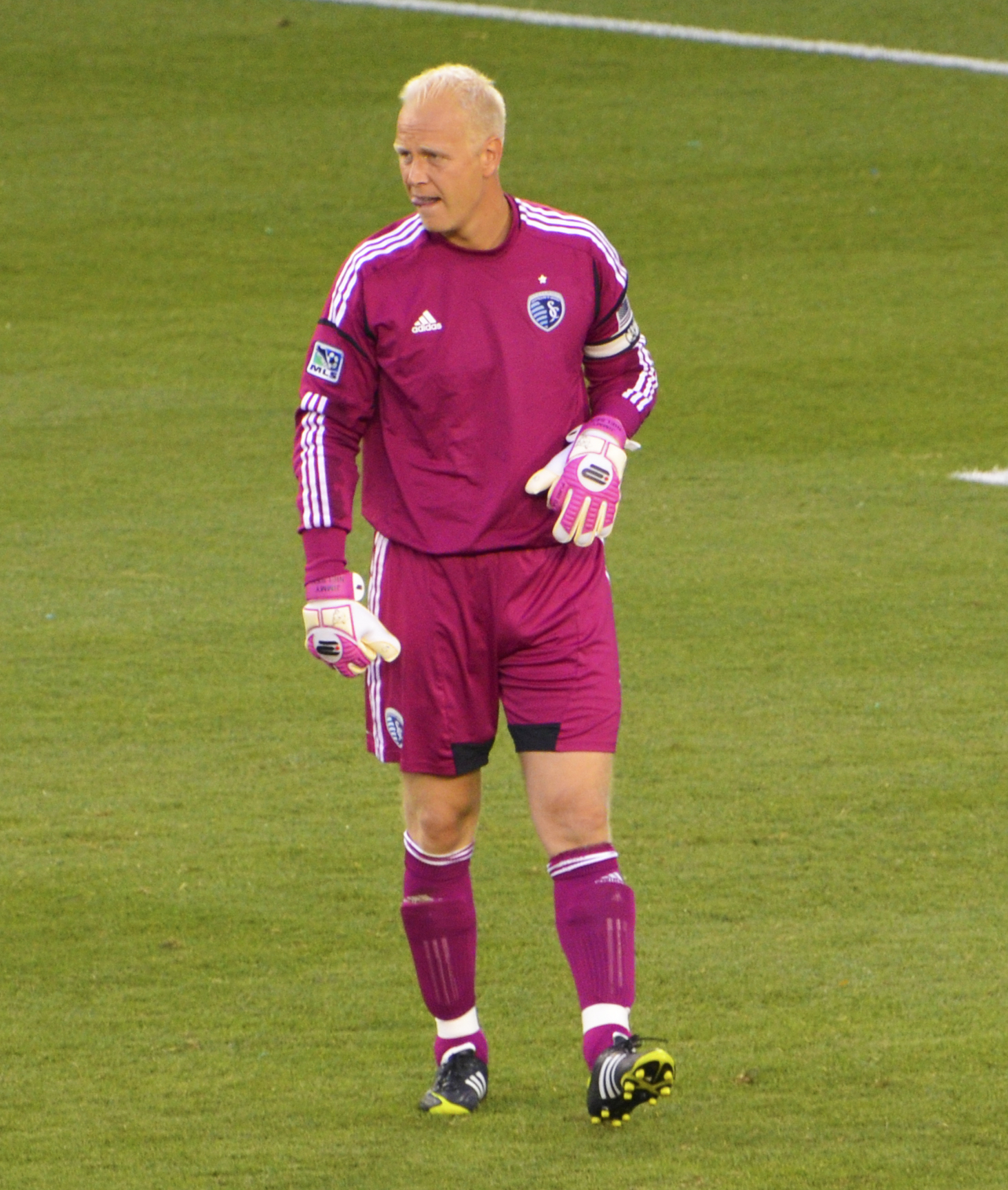
Jimmy Nielsen, 2021 Sporting Legends inductee.

Sporting Legends is an initiative launched in 2013 that pays tribute to the individuals who played an instrumental role for Sporting Kansas City and in the growth of soccer in the region.

The individuals named as Sporting Legends, their year of induction, and a brief description are listed below:

1. Preki (2013) – 2005 MLS All-Time Best XI, 1997 and 2003 MLS League MVP, Club's all-time leader in goals and assists.
2. Tony Meola (2013) – 2005 MLS All-Time Best XI, 2000 MLS MVP, 2000 MLS Goalkeeper of the Year, 2000 MLS Cup MVP.
3. Bob Gansler (2013) – 2000 MLS Coach of the Year, 2000 MLS Cup, 2000 MLS Supporters Shield.
4. Peter Vermes (2014) – as player: 2000 MLS Defender of the Year, 2000 MLS Cup, 2000 MLS Supporters Shield; as manager: 2012, 2015 and 2017 U.S. Open Cups, 2013 MLS Cup.
5. Jimmy Conrad – (2014) – 2004–06, 2008 MLS Best XI, 2004 U.S. Open Cup, 2005 MLS Defender of the Year.
6. Lamar Hunt (2014) – A founder of Major League Soccer, owned the Kansas City Wizards 1996–2006.
7. Chris Klein (2015) – 2000 MLS Cup, 2000 MLS Supporters Shield, 2004 U.S. Open Cup, 2002–2005 MLS All-Star.
8. Kerry Zavagnin (2016) – 2000 MLS Cup, 2000 MLS Supporters Shield, 2004 U.S. Open Cup, 2004 MLS All-Star, 2004 MLS Best XI.
9. Mo Johnston (2017) – 2000 MLS Cup, 2000 MLS Supporters Shield, 1996-1998 MLS All-Star.
10. Josh Wolff (2019) – 2004 U.S. Open Cup, 2004 MLS Western Conference Championship.
11. Jimmy Nielsen (2021) – 2012 U.S. Open Cup, 2013 MLS Cup, 2010, 2012, 2013 MLS Eastern Conference, 2012 MLS Best XI, 2012 MLS Goalkeeper of the Year.
12. Davy Arnaud (2022) — 2004 U.S. Open Cup, team captain 2010–2011
13. Benny Feilhaber (2024) — 2013 MLS Cup, 2015 and 2017 U.S. Open Cups

=== Hat tricks ===
Player	Date	Opponent
(Zimbabwe) Vitalis Takawira	May 16, 1998	New England Revolution
(United States) Preki	September 5, 1998	San Jose Earthquakes
(United States) Davy Arnaud	July 3, 2004	Dallas Burn
(United States) Eddie Johnson	May 26, 2007	New England Revolution
(United States) Eddie Johnson	June 2, 2007	New York Red Bulls
(Senegal) Birahim Diop	October 23, 2010	San Jose Earthquakes
(England) Dom Dwyer^{+}	July 1, 2015	FC Dallas
(Guinea-Bissau) Gerso	May 17, 2017	Seattle Sounders FC
(Scotland) Johnny Russell	April 20, 2018	Vancouver Whitecaps FC
(Hungary) Krisztián Németh	March 30, 2019	Montreal Impact
(Scotland) Johnny Russell	May 26, 2019	Seattle Sounders FC

+ Dom Dwyer scored four goals in this game

== See also ==
- List of Sporting Kansas City seasons
- Sports in Kansas City
