= Ian James (soccer) =

American soccer player (born 2008)

Personal information
- Full name: Ian Alexander James
- Date of birth: June 6, 2008 (age 18)
- Place of birth: Saint Paul, Minnesota, U.S.
- Height: 6 ft 2 in (1.88 m)
- Position: Center-back

Team information
- Current team: Sporting Kansas City
- Number: 2

Youth career
- Minnesota United
- 2021–2024: Sporting Kansas City

Senior career*
Years	Team	Apps	(Gls)
2024–	Sporting Kansas City II	18	(0)
2024–	Sporting Kansas City	8	(0)

International career^{‡}
2024	United States U16	1	(0)
- * Club domestic league appearances and goals as of 19:58, 23 October 2025 (UTC) ‡ National team caps and goals as of 01:16, 1 December 2024 (UTC)

Ian Alexander James (born June 6, 2008) is an American professional soccer player who plays as a center-back for the Major League Soccer club Sporting Kansas City.

== Club career ==
James joined the youth academy of Sporting Kansas City in 2021 from Minnesota United, and worked his way up their youth categories, before promoting to their reserve team in the MLS Next Pro for the 2024 season. On 6 December 2024, he signed a Homegrown contract with the senior Sporting Kansas City club until 2027. He made his senior debut with Sporting Kansas City as a substitute in a 3–1 CONCACAF Champions Cup loss to Inter Miami on 25 February 2025.

== International career ==
Born in the United States, James is of Latvian descent. He was called up to the United States U16s for a domestic camp on 18 April 2024. On 8 November 2024, he was called up for a training camp with the United States U17s.
