= 2013 Vancouver Whitecaps FC season =

Vancouver Whitecaps FC 2013 soccer season

Vancouver Whitecaps FC
2013 season
- Chairman: John Furlong
- Head coach: Martin Rennie
- Stadium: BC Place (Capacity 21,000)
- Major League Soccer: 7th, West; 11th, Overall
- Canadian Championship: 2nd
- Top goalscorer: League: Camilo (18); All: Camilo (21)
- Highest home attendance: 22,500 (capacity exceeded) vs.Seattle Sounders FC (Jul 6); 21,000 (sell-out) vs. Toronto FC (Mar 2) vs. LA Galaxy (May 11) vs. Philadelphia Union (Jul 27) vs. LA Galaxy (Aug 24) vs. Real Salt Lake (Sep 28)
- Lowest home attendance: 14,892 vs. FC Edmonton (May 1)
- Average home league attendance: 'League: 20,044; All: 19,689
Home colours	Away colours	Third colours

The 2013 Vancouver Whitecaps FC season was the Whitecaps' third season in Major League Soccer, the top tier of soccer in the United States and Canada.

== Season overview ==
=== January ===
January 11, 2013 Vancouver Whitecaps FC announced the signing of Brad Rusin. He was sold to the Whitecaps for an undisclosed fee.

The 2013 MLS SuperDraft was the fourteenth SuperDraft presented by Major League Soccer. The draft took place on January 17, 2013, in Indianapolis, at the Indiana Convention Center. Vancouver Whitecaps FC drafted Kekuta Manneh with the No. 4 pick and Erik Hurtado with the No. 5 pick in the MLS Super Draft.

January 21, 2013 the Vancouver Whitecaps FC and Barry Robson mutually agreed to terminate his Whitecaps contract. Robson later signed with Sheffield United.

January 23, 2013 Vancouver Whitecaps FC announce the signings of Corey Hertzog and Tom Heinemann to contracts.

January 25, 2013 Vancouver Whitecaps FC announced Martín Bonjour contract had been waived. Bonjour was a starter until the signing of defender Andy O'Brien

January 28, 2013 Whitecaps announced the signing of Japanese midfielder Daigo Kobayashi. He played last season with Shimizu S-Pulse of the J1 League.

=== February ===
The Caps went to Arizona to play three preseason games between January 29 and February 4, 2013. The first game against New England Revolution saw the Caps play to an easy 4–1 win. Darren Mattocks scored a hat trick with goals in the 2nd, 5th and 15th minutes. Kenny Miller scored in the 65th minute on a penalty kick to secure the win. The next game say the Caps improve to 2–0 in the preseason with a 2–1 win over the Houston Dynamo. Caps got goals from Mattocks (fourth goal in two games) and Hertzog's first of the preseason. Vancouver Whitecaps FC finished their Arizona training by improving to 3–0 in preseason with a 2–1 victory over the Arizona Sahuaros. New signing Paulo Jr scored the only goal of the game. Simon Thomas saw his first action with the Whitecaps since the 2010 season.

February 15, 2013 says the Whitecaps travel to Charleston, South Carolina to participate in the Carolina Challenge Cup. The first game saw the Whitecaps squeak out a 3–2 win over the Charleston Battery. Whitecaps got a brace from rookie Kekuta Manneh. Caps third goal was a goal of the year candidate by Daigo Kobayashi on a nice cross by Y.P. Lee.

February 17, 2013 the Vancouver Whitecaps FC played a friendly against College of Charleston. With a young looking lineup the Caps managed a 2–0 win. Improving their preseason record to 5–0. Paulo Jr managed the brace for the only two goals of the games. Veteran goalkeeper Joe Cannon managed the clean sheet and didn't see his first shot until the 88th minute.

February 19, 2013 Vancouver Whitecaps FC announced the signing of Honduran defender/midfielder Johnny Leverón. The club also announced they will play a friendly against the UVIC Vikings on March 16, 2013, at 1pm at Centennial Stadium. The Caps and Vikes have played every year since 2005 when the Blue and White were a North American second division club, including last year's 2–1 win for Whitecaps FC in the first-ever meeting between an MLS club and a Canadian Interuniversity Sport (CIS) side. Vancouver holds the edge in record with five wins, one defeat, and one draw.

February 20, 2013 A first-half goal from Corey Hertzog gave Vancouver Whitecaps FC the lead, but a pair of second-half goals in quick succession from Houston Dynamo saw the 'Caps fall to their first defeat of preseason. The loss drops the Caps preseason record to 5–1.

Nigel Reo-Coker accepted an offer from the Whitecaps on February 21, 2013. His discovery rights had been held by Portland, but Reo-Coker expressed a desire to play for the Vancouver club instead having been impressed with the professionalism of Vancouver head coach Martin Rennie.

Vancouver Whitecaps FC and Chicago Fire played to a 1–1 draw on February 23, 2013, in the final game for both teams at the Carolina Challenge Cup. The draw gave the Chicago Fire the win for the tournament. Mattocks scored his fifth of the pre-season on a penalty kick in the 68th minute. Miller was tackled in the box to get the Whitecaps the penalty kick opportunity. The Caps finished the Carolina Cup with a 1–1–1 record.

The Whitecaps defeated the Carolina Railhawks 3–0 on February 24, 2013, to win the Carolina Community Shield. They were led by Camilo's hat trick to put the Railhawks to rest. This match was the final preseason match.

The 'Caps announced the signing of goalkeeper Simon Thomas to a contract on February 25, 2013. This is his second stint with the team. The following day it was announced that Gershon Koffie signed a contract extension and obtained a Canadian residency card which frees an international roster slot.

=== March ===
The Vancouver Whitecaps opened the season with a 1–0 victory over Canadian rival TFC. Koffie scored the only goal of the game in the 59'. Joe Cannon earned the clean sheet.

On March 9, 2013, the Caps defeated the Columbus Crew 2–1 for a second straight victory to start the season. Daigo Kobayashi opened the scoring in the 6' with a 35-yard strike. Columbus scored in the 46' to tie the game 1–1. Kenny Miller created his own chance on a Crew turnover in the 57' to seal the victory.

A first-half goal from Darren Mattocks was not enough on March 23, 2013, as Vancouver Whitecaps fell to a 2–1 defeat against Houston Dynamo at BBVA Compass Stadium. The club lost their second consecutive match on the road with a 2–1 defeat to Chivas USA. Kenny Miller scored his team-leading second goal of the year in the 64th minute.

Whitecaps finished March with a 2W 2L record.

=== April ===
April 6, 2013 The Vancouver Whitecaps and SJ Earthquake played to a 1–1 draw. Corey Hertzog scored his first MLS goal to give the Whitecaps a hard earned draw.

April 13, 2013 The Vancouver Whitecaps and Real Salt Lake played to a 1–1 draw. It was the Caps second straight draw with a 1–1 result. Camilo scored on a PK in the 84' min to get the Whitecaps the result.

April 14, 2013 The Whitecaps reserves kicked off their regular season with a 2–0 result against the RSL reserves side. Koffie was caution with a yellow in the 25' minute. Harvey got the Whitecaps on the board with a goal in the 44' minute just before half. Hurtado sealed the victory with a goal in the 85' minute to give the Whitecaps a 2–0 win. Knighton earned the clean sheet in his first minutes of the season.

April 16, 2013 The Whitecaps announced Ben Fisk and Emmanuel Adjetey have joined USL Pro side Charleston Battery on season-long loans.

April 17, 2013 The Whitecaps announced they waived Paulo Jr. He joined the Whitecaps after being selected by Vancouver with the 10th pick in Stage 2 of the 2012 MLS Re-Entry Draft on December 14, 2012.

April 20, 2013 The Whitecaps suffered their 3rd road defeat to start the season with a 2–0 loss against FC Dallas. Matt Watson and Tommy Heinemann make their first starts for Vancouver this season.

April 24, 2013 In the first leg of the Amway Canadian Championship semifinal, the Whitecaps needed a late winner by substitute Heinemann to come from behind and defeat FC Edmonton by a score of 3–2 at Commonwealth Stadium. Camilo scored a brace with a strike in the 5' minute and a penalty kick in the 83' minute. The return leg is at BC Place May 1, 2013.

April 27, 2013 Whitecaps and FC Dallas played to a 2–2 draw. The Caps tied it up with goals by Camilo and Kekuta Manneh to earn the draw.

April 30, 2013 Whitecaps announced Bryce Alderson has joined Charleston Battery for the season on loan.

Whitecaps finished April with a 1W 1L 3D record

=== May ===
May 1, 2013 The Whitecaps punched their ticket to the Amway final with a 2–0 win over FC Edmonton. The Whitecaps won their semi final with a 5–2 aggregate score. Hertzog scored a scorcher from 25 yards out after coming in as a second-half sub. Teibert had his corner put in by Shaun Saiko for a FC Edmonton own goal. The win gives the Whitecaps a date with the Montreal Impact after they defeated Toronto FC 6–2 in the other semifinal. The Impact will host the first leg at Saputo Stadium on May 15 before the Whitecaps host the second leg at BC Place on May 29.

May 2, 2013 Whitecaps FC announced that Ghanaian midfielder Aminu Abdallah. Abdallah, 19, joins Whitecaps FC following five years with Ghanaian club International Allies FC. The native of Accra, Ghana, is a member of Ghana's U-20 side and played with fellow 'Caps midfielder Gershon Koffie from 2008 to 2010 with International Allies FC.

May 4, 2013 The Whitecaps fell 2–0 to Real Salt Lake. They are still trying to earn their first win on the road for the 2013 season. Nigel Reo-Coker picked up his 4th yellow of the season. One more and he is suspended for a game.

May 7, 2013 Whitecaps FC reserves improved to 2–0 with a win over Colorado Rapids Reserves. Manneh scored in the 12' minute to open the scoring to give the Whitecaps a 1–0 lead. Rapids tied the score in the 41' minute to go into half tied 1–1. In the 74' minute Heinemann scored the game winner to get the Whitecaps reserves a 2–1 win.

May 10, 2013 Whitecaps U23 opened the USL PDL season with a 2–1 victory over the Kitsap Pumas. It was a chippy game with 5 yellow cards handed out. After the Pumas opened the scoring in the 6' minute then Caps came back in the second-half with goals by Cam Hundal and Spencer DeBoice. Simon Thomas earned the victory with a solid game.

May 11, 2013 The Whitecaps defeated LA Galaxy 3–1 to earn their first MLS victory since March 9 vs. Columbus Crew. The Caps got a brace by Teibert and Mattocks scored in injury time to seal the victory.

May 15, 2013 The Vancouver Whitecaps played to a 0–0 draw with the Montreal Impact in leg one of the Amway Championship. This sets up the final leg to be played May 29 at BC Place at 7pm. The Whitecaps will be hoping to earn their first Voyageurs Cup in club history.

May 17, 2013 Whitecaps U23 lost a 3–2 heartbreaker to the Victoria Highlanders in PDL play. The loss dropped the Whitecaps to a record of 1–1. The Whitecaps got a brace by Niall Cousens but it wasn't enough to earn a draw. The win gives the Highlanders the lead in the Juan de Fuca Plate competition.

May 18, 2013 The Whitecaps started their quest for a Cascadia championship with a 2–2 draw against the Portland Timbers. A first half free kick goal by Camilo put the Whitecaps up 1–0 at half. Koffie put the Whitecaps up 2–1 in the 54' minute. Reo-Coker picked up his fifth yellow of the season and will be suspended for the June 1 match vs New York Red Bulls.

May 19, 2013 Whitecaps FC reserves improved their record to 2–1–0 with a 1–1 draw with the Portland Timbers reserves. Heinemann scored the Whitecaps lone goal in the 26' minute. Simon Thomas earned the draw.

May 23, 2013 Whitecaps U23 dropped a 2–0 defeat to the Portland Timbers PDL team. The loss drops their record to 1 win and 2 losses.

May 26, 2013 Whitecaps U23 improved their record to 2–2 with a 5–1 defeat of the North Sound SeaWolves FC. Harry Lakhan and Spencer DeBoice each scored a brace, with Niall Cousens capping off the 5 goal outbreak.

May 29, 2013 Whitecaps played to a 2–2 draw with the Montreal Impact in the final of the Amway Championship. The draw gave the Impact the trophy and gave the Whitecaps second place for the fifth straight year. Whitecaps got goals from Camilo and Kobayashi.

May 31, 2013 Whitecaps U23 improved their record to 3–2 with a 5–3 defeat of the Victoria Highlanders. The victory gives the Whitecaps the lead for the Juan de Fuca Plate with the lead with away goals (5). The deciding game is June 28, 2013 at 7pm at UBC Thunderbird Stadium.

Whitecaps finished May with a 2–1–3 record in all competitions

=== June ===
June 1, 2013 The Whitecaps earned their first victory on the road of the 2013 season with a come from behind 2–1 victory over the New York Red Bulls. The Whitecaps got goals from Jordan Harvey and Kenny Miller. Brad Knighton earned the victory in goal.

June 2, 2013 Whitecaps U23 dropped their record to 3W 3L 0D with a 1–0 defeat at the hands of Seattle Sounders U23.

June 5, 2013 The Whitecaps Reserves squandered a 3–0 lead at half against Chivas USA Reserves. Chivas came back with three goals in the second half to earn a point with a 3–3 draw. Manneh opened the scoring with a strike in the 6' min. The Whitecaps got a brace from striker Heinemann with goals in the 33' and 45' mins. Joe Cannon was in goal for the first half, Simon Thomas replaced him. Reserves next game is June 22 with an exhibition game against the Richmond Kickers.

June 6, 2013 Whitecaps FC trades Alain Rochat to D.C. United for a natural second-round pick in the 2015 MLS SuperDraft, as well as a conditional pick in 2016.

June 7, 2013 Whitecaps U23 defeated North Sound SeaWolves FC by a score of 3–2. The win gives the U23 a record of 4W 3L 0D. Whitecaps got goals by Cam Hundal, Harry Lakhan and the winner in injury time by Michael Winter to seal the victory.

June 8, 2013 Whitecaps U23 played to a hard-fought 2–2 with the Kitsap Pumas. It was their second game in two nights. Harry Lakhan scored his second goal in two nights. Niall Cousens scored in the 71st min to get the U23's a draw. Their record is 4W 3L 1D.

The Whitecaps lost a 3–2 heart-breaker to the Seattle Sounders FC. The Sounders opened the scoring in the ninth minute to go up 1–0. Camilo tied the game up 1 minute later with a header of a Teibert cross. Camilo put the Whitecaps up 2–1 with another header off a free kick by Teibert. Things were looking good until Andy O'Brien went down with a hamstring injury in the 62nd minute. Sounders tied it in the 70th minute with a penalty kick after Greg Klazura got called for a penalty in the box. The Sounders went up for good with a goal in the 81st minute to seal the victory.

June 12, 2013 Whitecaps U23 fell 2–0 to the Washington Crossfire. The loss drops their record to 4W 4L 1D.

June 15, 2013 The Whitecaps pulled out a thrilling 4–3 victory over the New England Revolution. They got a brace from Miller, and goals from Camilo and Jordan Harvey. After going down 2–0 in the first 20 minutes, Miller earned the Whitecaps a penalty kick well being taken down in the box. The Revolution were down to 10 men after a red card was issued on the penalty. In the 68' minute Miller scored the Whitecaps goal of the year with a floater over two defenders and the keeper from 20 yards out.

June 19, 2013 The Whitecaps pulled out a second straight come from behind victory with a 3–1 win over Chivas USA. After going down 1–0 early the Whitecaps got two goals in the first half in injury time from Harvey and then from Camilo. The two goals gave the Whitecaps the lead at half. Camilo put the game away with his second goal of the game in the 81st minute.

June 20, 2013 The Whitecaps announced the signing of Danish goalkeeper David Ousted who most recently played for Randers of the Danish Superliga.

June 21, 2013 Whitecaps U23 pulled out a 4–2 victory over the Seattle Sounders U23's. They got three goals and one assist from Bobby Jhutty. The win gives them a record of 5W 4L 1D.

June 22, 2013 The Whitecaps Reserves earned a 1–1 versus the Richmond Kickers. Whitecaps got the goal from Kekuta Manneh.

June 28, 2013 The Whitecaps U23 battled to a 1–1 draw against Victoria Highlanders FC despite being reduced to 10 men. The point was enough for Vancouver to claim the Juan de Fuca Plate for the second season in a row.

June 29, 2013 The Whitecaps pulled out a 1–0 victory over D.C. United. Whitecaps got their lone strike from Camilo. Knighton earned their first clean sheet since game one of the MLS season.

Whitecaps finished June with a 4W 1L record in all competitions.

=== July ===
July 3, 2013 The Whitecaps earned a hard-fought 1–1 draw against Sporting KC. Camilo scored his tenth MLS goal and thirteenth goal over all this season.

July 6, 2013 The Whitecaps won their first Cascada match in 12 games with a 2–0 victory over the Seattle Sounders FC. Knighton earned his second clean sheet in three games with a handful of amazing saves. Whitecaps got goals from Miller and Mattocks.

On July 7, 2013, the Whitecaps reserves defeated the Seattle Sounders reserves 4–0. This was David Ousted's first appearance for the Whitecaps. The Whitecaps used a lineup of young players and received goals from Hurtado, Sam Adekugbe, and two goals from Heinemann, representing his fifth and sixth reserve goals of the season.

July 14, 2013 The Whitecaps defeated the Chicago Fire 3–1 to remain undefeated at BC Place. The Whitecaps got two second-half goals from Camilo, his 11th and league-leading 12th of the season. Kekuta Manneh put the game away with his second goal of the season. Chicago scored late in second-half stoppage time to rob Knighton of his clean sheet. The keeper stormed off the field when play resumed and the final whistle blew but later made a public apology to his teammates and the fans.

The Whitecaps U23 secured a playoff position with a 1–0 victory over the Washington Crossfire.

July 16, 2013 The Whitecaps reserves were defeated for the first time falling 3–2 in heartbreaking fashion to Real Salt Lake reserves. The Caps got goals from Kevin Cobby and Kekuta Manneh.

July 17, 2013 The Whitecaps U23 finished off the PDL season with a 4–1 win over North Sound SeaWolves FC. The Caps got a brace from Cam Hundal and goals from Niall Cousens and Sasa Plavsic.

July 20, 2013 The Whitecaps FC fell 2–1 to the LA Galaxy. Camilo got his 13th MLS goal of the season and 16th overall.

July 23, 2013 The Whitecaps Reserves fell 2–1 to the Richmond Kickers. Manneh scored in the 90th minute.

The Whitecaps U23 suffered a heartbreaking 5–4 loss on penalty kicks to the Portland Timbers. The loss ends the U23 PDL season for the young team.

July 27, 2013 The Whitecaps FC fell 1–0 to the Philadelphia Union for their 1st loss at home this season

Whitecaps finished July with a 2W 2L 1D record in all competitions

=== August ===
August 3, 2013 The Whitecaps earned a 1–1 draw against the Portland Timbers in David Ousted's MLS debut. The Whitecaps got a Jordan Harvey goal to earn the draw. The single point continued to give the Whitecaps the lead for the Cascadia Cup. The following day, the Whitecaps reserves beat the Portland Timbers reserves 3–2 to move into first place in the reserves West division table. The Whitecaps got a brace from Tommy Heinemann and a goal from Erik Hurtado to earn the victory.

August 8, 2013 the Whitecaps loaned striker Corey Hertzog to FC Edmonton.

The Whitecaps announced a contract extension for central back Andy O'Brien until the end of the 2014 season.

August 10, 2013 David Ousted earned his first career MLS clean sheet in his home debut at BC Place with a 2–0 win over the San Jose Earthquakes. The Whitecaps got goals from Camilo and Kenny Miller. Both goals were set up by Nigel Reo-Coker.

August 17, 2013 the Whitecaps fell 2–0 to the Colorado Rapids. This was Ousted's first MLS loss.

August 24, 2013 the Whitecaps lost 1–0 to the LA Galaxy. The Galaxy got the only goal of the game from Landon Donovan in the 3rd minute. With a yellow card in the 91st minute Nigel Reo-Coker will be suspended for the September 1 game against Chivas USA. The loss drop Ousted's MLS record to 1 win 2 losses 1 draw 1.00GAA.

Whitecaps finished August with a 1W 2L 1D record in all competitions

== Squad ==
=== Roster ===
As of July 6, 2013

No.	Player	Nationality	Position	Date of birth (age)	Previous club
Goalkeepers
1	Joe Cannon	United States	GK	January 1, 1975 (age 51)	San Jose Earthquakes
18	Brad Knighton	United States	GK	February 6, 1985 (age 41)	Carolina RailHawks
22	David Ousted	Denmark	GK	February 1, 1985 (age 41)	Randers FC
39	Simon Thomas	Canada	GK	April 12, 1990 (age 36)	Huddersfield Town
Defenders
2	Brad Rusin	United States	CB	September 5, 1986 (age 40)	HB Koge
3	Jordan Harvey	United States	LB	January 28, 1984 (age 42)	Philadelphia Union
6	Jay DeMerit	United States	CB	December 4, 1979 (age 46)	Watford F.C.
12	Lee Young-Pyo	South Korea	RB	April 23, 1977 (age 49)	Al-Hilal FC
16	Johnny Leverón	Honduras	CB	February 7, 1990 (age 36)	C.D. Motagua
24	Carlyle Mitchell	Trinidad and Tobago	CB	August 8, 1987 (aged 25)	Joe Public F.C.
32	Greg Klazura	United States	RB	January 27, 1988 (age 38)	Notre Dame Fighting Irish
40	Andy O'Brien	Ireland	CB	June 29, 1979 (age 47)	Leeds United A.F.C.
Midfielders
8	Matt Watson	England	CM	January 1, 1985 (age 41)	Carolina Railhawks
13	Nigel Reo-Coker	England	CM	May 14, 1984 (age 42)	Ipswich Town
14	Daigo Kobayashi	Japan	CM	February 19, 1983 (age 43)	Shimizu S-Pulse
20	Aminu Abdallah	Ghana	MF	January 7, 1994 (age 32)	International Allies FC
27	Jun Marques Davidson	Japan	DM	June 7, 1983 (age 43)	Tokushima Vortis
28	Gershon Koffie	Ghana	MF	August 25, 1991 (age 35)	Vancouver Whitecaps (USSF-D2)
36	Bryce Alderson	Canada	MF	February 5, 1994 (age 32)	Vancouver Whitecaps FC Residency
Forwards
7	Camilo	Brazil	FW	July 21, 1988 (age 38)	Gyeongnam FC
9	Kenny Miller	Scotland	FW	December 23, 1979 (age 46)	Cardiff City
11	Darren Mattocks	Jamaica	FW	September 2, 1990 (age 36)	Akron Zips
17	Omar Salgado	United States	FW	September 10, 1993 (age 33)	C.D. Guadalajara
19	Erik Hurtado	United States	FW	May 11, 1990 (age 36)	Santa Clara
23	Kekuta Manneh	Gambia	FW	December 30, 1994 (age 31)	Austin Aztex
26	Corey Hertzog	United States	FW	August 1, 1990 (age 36)	New York Red Bulls
29	Tom Heinemann	United States	FW	April 23, 1987 (age 39)	Columbus Crew
31	Russell Teibert	Canada	FW	December 22, 1992 (age 33)	Vancouver Whitecaps (USSF-D2)
34	Caleb Clarke	Canada	FW	June 23, 1993 (age 33)	Vancouver Whitecaps FC Residency

=== Technical staff ===
Role	Name	Nation
Head coach	Martin Rennie	Scotland
Assistant coach	Paul Ritchie	Scotland
Assistant coach	Carl Robinson	Wales
Assistant coach/Scouting Coordinator	Jake DeClute	United States
Goalkeeper coach	Marius Røvde	Norway
Physiotherapist	Graeme Poole	Canada

=== Management ===
Role	Name	Nation
Executive Chair	John Furlong	Ireland
President	Bob Lenarduzzi	Canada
Chief Operating Officer	Rachel Lewis	Canada
Vice President of Finance & Administration	Don Ford	Canada

=== Transfers in ===
Date	Player	Position	Previous club	Fee/notes	Ref
December 14, 2012	(Brazil) Paulo Jr.	FW	(United States) Real Salt Lake	2012 Re-Entry Draft	
January 11, 2013	(United States) Brad Rusin	DF	(Denmark) HB Køge	Undisclosed transfer	
January 23, 2013	(United States) Tom Heinemann	FW	(United States) Columbus Crew	Free	
January 23, 2013	(United States) Corey Hertzog	FW	(United States) New York Red Bulls	Free	
January 28, 2013	(Japan) Daigo Kobayashi	MF	(Japan) Shimizu S-Pulse	Free	
February 19, 2013	(Honduras) Johnny Leverón	CB	(Honduras) C.D. Motagua	Free	
February 21, 2013	(England) Nigel Reo-Coker	MF	(England) Ipswich Town	Gave Portland Timbers 2014 & 2015 2nd round draft picks for discovery rights.	
February 25, 2013	(Canada) Simon Thomas	GK	(England) Huddersfield Town	Free	
May 2, 2013	(Ghana) Aminu Abdallah	MF	(Ghana) International Allies FC	Free	
June 20, 2013	(Denmark) David Ousted	GK	(Denmark) Randers FC	Free	

=== Transfers out ===
Date	Player	Position	Destination club	Fee/notes	Ref
November 8, 2012	(Malta) Etienne Barbara	FW		Option declined. Later signed with Minnesota Stars FC.	
November 8, 2012	(United States) Brian Sylvestre	GK		Option declined	
November 8, 2012	(Brazil) Tiago Ulisses	MF		Option declined	
December 3, 2012	(Saint Kitts and Nevis) Atiba Harris	FW	(United States) Colorado Rapids	Traded for 2015 and 2016 international roster slot	
December 3, 2012	(United States) Michael Nanchoff	MF		Option declined. Later signed with Portland Timbers.	
December 14, 2012	(United States) John Thorrington	MF	(United States) D.C. United	2012 Re-Entry Draft. Later signed with D.C. United.	
January 21, 2013	(Scotland) Barry Robson	MF		Released. Later signed with Sheffield United.	
January 25, 2013	(Argentina) Martín Bonjour	DF		Waived	
January 28, 2013	(Canada) Kyle Porter	FW	(United States) D.C. United	Traded for 2014 second round MLS supplemental pick	
April 17, 2013	(Brazil) Paulo Jr.	FW		Waived, later signed with Fort Lauderdale Strikers	
June 6, 2013	(Switzerland) Alain Rochat	DF	(United States) D.C. United	Traded for second round 2015 MLS SuperDraft & conditional 2016 picks	
July 6, 2013	(United States) Adam Clement	DF		Waived	

=== Draft picks ===
Date	Player	Number	Position	Previous club	Fee/notes	Ref
December 14, 2012	(Brazil) Paulo Jr.	10	FW	(United States) Real Salt Lake	2012 MLS Re-Entry 1st Round Pick (No. 10)	
January 17, 2013	(The Gambia) Kekuta Manneh	23	FW	(United States) Austin Aztex	2013 MLS SuperDraft 1st Round Pick (No. 4), Generation Adidas	
January 17, 2013	(United States) Erik Hurtado	19	FW	(United States) Santa Clara	2013 MLS Superdraft 1st Round Pick (No. 5)	
January 22, 2013	(United States) Adam Mena		FW	(United States) Notre Dame	2013 MLS Supplemental Draft 1st Round Pick (No. 10)	
January 22, 2013	(United States) Michael Rose		FW	(United States) Notre Dame	2013 MLS Supplemental Draft 1st Round Pick (No. 11)	
January 22, 2013	(United States) Brian Rogers		FW	(United States) Harvard	2013 MLS Supplemental Draft 2nd Round Pick (No. 29)	
January 22, 2013	(United States) Adam Clement	33	FW	(United States) Duquesne	2013 MLS Supplemental Draft 2nd Round Pick (No. 34)	
January 22, 2013	(Venezuela) Alejandro Sucre		FW	(United States) Amherst	2013 MLS Supplemental Draft 2nd Round Pick (No. 67)	

=== Loan out ===
Date from	Date to	Player	Number	Position	Destination club	Fee/notes	Ref
March 11, 2013	May 8, 2013	(Trinidad and Tobago) Carlyle Mitchell	24	DF	(Canada) FC Edmonton	undisclosed	
April 16, 2013	end of season	(Canada) Ben Fisk		FW	(United States) Charleston Battery	undisclosed	
April 16, 2013	end of season	(Ghana) Emmanuel Adjetey		MF	(United States) Charleston Battery	undisclosed	
April 30, 2013	end of season	(Canada) Bryce Alderson	36	MF	(United States) Charleston Battery	undisclosed	
July 9, 2013	end of season	(Canada) Caleb Clarke	34	FW	(Germany) FC Augsburg II	undisclosed	
August 8, 2013	end of NASL season	(United States) Corey Hertzog	26	FW	(Canada) FC Edmonton	undisclosed	

== Preseason competitions ==
=== Arizona training ===
January 29	Vancouver Whitecaps FC	4–1	New England Revolution	Casa Grande, Arizona
17:00 PST	Mattocks 2', 4', 15'; Miller 65' (pen.); Klazura (yellow card) 65'	Recap	Tierney 11'	Stadium: Grande Sports World

February 2	Vancouver Whitecaps FC	2–1	Houston Dynamo	Tucson, Arizona
15:00 PST	Mattocks 33'; Hertzog 64'	Recap	Boswell 30'	Stadium: Kino Sports Complex

February 4	Vancouver Whitecaps FC	1–0	Arizona Sahuaros	Casa Grande, Arizona
17:00 PST	Paulo Jr. 64'	Recap		Stadium: Grande Sports World

=== South Carolina training ===
February 17	Vancouver Whitecaps FC	2–0	College of Charleston	Mount Pleasant, South Carolina
14:00 PST	Paulo Jr. 10', 28'	Recap		Stadium: Patriots Point Athletics Complex

=== Carolina Challenge Cup ===
February 16	Vancouver Whitecaps FC	3–2	Charleston Battery	Charleston, South Carolina
16:15 PST	Manneh 4', 28'; Harvey (yellow card) 19'; Kobayashi 50'; Rochat (yellow card) 66'	Recap	Ellison (yellow card) 49'; Patterson (yellow card) 66' (goal) 71'; Kelly 80'	Stadium: Blackbaud Stadium

February 20	Vancouver Whitecaps FC	1–2	Houston Dynamo	Charleston, South Carolina
14:00 PST	Hertzog 27'	Recap	Arena (yellow card) 55'; Bruin 75'; Moffat 76'	Stadium: Blackbaud Stadium

February 23	Vancouver Whitecaps FC	1–1	Chicago Fire	Charleston, South Carolina
13:30 PST	Koffie (yellow card) 44'; Mattocks 68' (pen.)	Recap	Santos 57'; Thompson (yellow card) 83'	Stadium: Blackbaud Stadium

=== Carolina Derby ===
February 24	Vancouver Whitecaps FC	3–0	Carolina RailHawks	Cary, North Carolina
10:30 PST	Camilo 9' (pen.), 34', 49'	Recap		Stadium: WakeMed Soccer Park

== Preseason player statistics ==
GP	W	L	D	GF	GA	GD
8	6	1	1	17	7	+10

Updated as of February 24, 2013

Field players

Preseason
Player	G	A
Darren Mattocks	5	1
Camilo Sanvezzo	3	2
Paulo Jr	3	0
Kekuta Manneh	2	1
Corey Hertzog	2	0
Daigo Kobayashi	1	1
Kenny Miller	1	0
Erik Hurtado	0	1
Alain Rochat	0	1
Young-Pyo Lee	0	1
Russell Teibert	0	1
Greg Klazura	0	1
Joe Cannon	0	1

Updated as of February 24, 2013

Goalkeepers

Preseason
Player	W	L	D	Mins	GAA	SO
Joe Cannon	2	0	1	270	0.67	1
Brad Knighton	3	1	0	353	1.67	1
Simon Thomas	1	0	0	90	0.00	1
Sean Melvin	0	0	0	7	0.00	0

== 2013 season overall ==
Competition	Started round	Current position / round	Final position / round	First match	Last match
Major League Soccer	—	7th	7th, West; 13th, Overall	March 2	October 29
MLS Cup Playoffs	—	—			
Canadian Championship	Semi-finals	Final	2nd	April 24	May 29
Cascadia Cup	—	—	Winners	May 18	October 9

Updated to match played November 11, 2013
Source: Competitions

=== Squad stats ===
	2013 MLS Season	2013 Canadian Champ.	2013 MLS Playoffs	Total Stats
Games played	34	4	0	38
Games won	13	2	0	15
Games drawn	9	2	0	11
Games lost	12	0	0	12
Goals scored	53	7	0	60
Goals conceded	45	4	0	49
Goal difference	+8	+3	0	+11
Clean sheets	7	2	0	9
Shots	438	67	0	505
Shots on goal	155	27	0	182
Saves	103	11	0	114
Fouls	387	40	0	427
Offsides	72	11	0	83
Corners	139	27	0	166
Yellow cards	46	3	0	49
Red cards	1	0	0	1
Goals by FW	41	5	0	46
Goals by MF	8	1	0	9
Goals by DF	4	0	0	4
Goals by starters	44	3	0	47
Goals by subs	9	3	0	12

== Major League Soccer ==
=== Western Conference standings ===
Pos	Team	Pld	W	L	T	GF	GA	GD	Pts	Qualification
1	Portland Timbers	34	14	5	15	54	33	+21	57	Qualification for the conference semifinals
2	Real Salt Lake	34	16	10	8	57	41	+16	56	Qualification for the conference semifinals
3	LA Galaxy	34	15	11	8	53	38	+15	53	Qualification for the conference semifinals
4	Seattle Sounders FC	34	15	12	7	42	42	0	52	Qualification for the knockout round
5	Colorado Rapids	34	14	11	9	45	38	+7	51	Qualification for the knockout round
6	San Jose Earthquakes	34	14	11	9	35	42	−7	51	
7	Vancouver Whitecaps FC	34	13	12	9	53	45	+8	48	
8	FC Dallas	34	11	12	11	48	52	−4	44	
9	Chivas USA	34	6	20	8	30	67	−37	26	

Source: MLS

==== Overall table ====
Note: the table below has no impact on playoff qualification and is used solely for determining host of the MLS Cup, certain CCL spots, and 2014 MLS draft. The conference tables are the sole determinant for teams qualifying to the playoffs

Pos	Team	Pld	W	L	T	GF	GA	GD	Pts	
1	New York Red Bulls (S)	34	17	9	8	58	41	+17	59	Qualification for the CONCACAF Champions League
2	Sporting Kansas City (C)	34	17	10	7	47	30	+17	58	Qualification for the CONCACAF Champions League
3	Portland Timbers	34	14	5	15	54	33	+21	57	Qualification for the CONCACAF Champions League
4	Real Salt Lake	34	16	10	8	57	41	+16	56	
5	LA Galaxy	34	15	11	8	53	38	+15	53	
6	Seattle Sounders FC	34	15	12	7	42	42	0	52	
7	New England Revolution	34	14	11	9	49	38	+11	51	
8	Colorado Rapids	34	14	11	9	45	38	+7	51	
9	Houston Dynamo	34	14	11	9	41	41	0	51	
10	San Jose Earthquakes	34	14	11	9	35	42	−7	51	
11	Montreal Impact (V)	34	14	13	7	50	49	+1	49	Qualification for the CONCACAF Champions League
12	Chicago Fire	34	14	13	7	47	52	−5	49	
13	Vancouver Whitecaps FC	34	13	12	9	53	45	+8	48	
14	Philadelphia Union	34	12	12	10	42	44	−2	46	
15	FC Dallas	34	11	12	11	48	52	−4	44	
16	Columbus Crew	34	12	17	5	42	46	−4	41	
17	Toronto FC	34	6	17	11	30	47	−17	29	
18	Chivas USA	34	6	20	8	30	67	−37	26	
19	D.C. United (U)	34	3	24	7	22	59	−37	16	Qualification for the CONCACAF Champions League

Source: MLS
Rules for classification: 1) points; 2) head-to-head record; 3) goal difference; 4) number of goals scored
(C) MLS Cup champions; (S) Supporters' Shield winners; (U) U.S. Open Cup winners; (V) Canadian Championship winners

==== Results summary ====
Overall								Home						Away					
Pld	Pts	W	L	D	GF	GA	GD	W	L	D	GF	GA	GD	W	L	D	GF	GA	GD
34	48	13	12	9	53	45	+8	9	3	5	32	19	+13	4	9	4	21	26	−5

Last updated: October 9, 2013
Pld = Matches played; Pts = Points; W = Matches won; T = Matches tied; L = Matches lost; GF = Goals for; GA = Goals against; GD = Goal difference

==== Results ====
Round	1	2	3	4	5	6	7	8	9	10	11	12	13	14	15	16	17	18	19	20	21	22	23	24	25	26	27	28	29	30	31	32	33	34
Ground	H	H	A	A	A	H	A	H	A	H	H	A	A	H	H	A	A	H	H	A	H	A	H	A	H	H	A	A	A	H	H	A	A	H
Result	W	W	L	L	D	D	L	D	L	W	D	W	L	W	W	W	D	W	W	L	L	D	W	L	L	D	L	D	W	L	D	W	L	W

Updated to match(es) played on October 19, 2013. Source: Schedule | Vancouver Whitecaps FC
A = Away; H = Home; W = Win; D = Draw; L = Loss

March 2, 2013 MLS 1	Vancouver Whitecaps FC	1–0	Toronto FC	Vancouver, BC, Canada
15:30 (PDT)	Koffie 59'	Recap	Dunfield (yellow card) 27'	Stadium: BC Place; Attendance: 21,000; Referee: Juan Guzman

March 9, 2013 MLS 2	Vancouver Whitecaps FC	2–1	Columbus Crew	Vancouver, BC, Canada
16:30 (PDT)	Kobayashi 6'; Miller 57'	Recap	Gláuber (yellow card) 19'; Arrieta 46', (yellow card) 88'	Stadium: BC Place; Attendance: 18,078; Referee: Drew Fischer

March 23, 2013 MLS 3	Houston Dynamo	2–1	Vancouver Whitecaps FC	Houston, Texas, U.S.
17:30 (PDT)	Barnes 55'; Moffat (yellow card) 61'; Creavalle 62'	Recap	Mattocks 36'; Reo-Coker (yellow card) 52'	Stadium: BBVA Compass Stadium; Referee: Matthew Foerster

March 30, 2013 MLS 4	Chivas USA	2–1	Vancouver Whitecaps FC	Los Angeles, California, U.S.
19:30 (PDT)	Davidson (own) 12'; Avila 55'	Report	Reo-Coker (yellow card) 54'; Miller 64'	Stadium: Home Depot Center; Referee: Ismail Elfath

April 6, 2013 MLS 5	San Jose Earthquakes	1–1	Vancouver Whitecaps FC	San Jose, California, U.S.
19:30 (PDT)	Wondolowski 18'; Baca (yellow card) 22'; Corrales (yellow card) 40'; Fucito (yellow card) 78'; Lenhart (yellow card) 86'	Report	Hertzog 62'; Rochat (yellow card) 65'; Teibert (yellow card) 66'	Stadium: Buck Shaw Stadium; Attendance: 10,525; Referee: Fotis Bazakos

April 13, 2013 MLS 6	Vancouver Whitecaps FC	1–1	Real Salt Lake	Vancouver, BC, Canada
13:00 (PDT)	Camilo 84' (pen.)	Recap	Schuler (yellow card) 18'; Garcia 66' (yellow card) 67'; Palmer (yellow card) 81'	Stadium: BC Place; Attendance: 19,612; Referee: Drew Fischer

April 20, 2013 MLS 7	FC Dallas	2–0	Vancouver Whitecaps FC	Frisco, Texas, U.S.
17:30 (PDT)	Rusin 29' (o.g.); Perez 50'; John (yellow card) 61'	Recap	Reo-Coker (yellow card) 45'	Stadium: FC Dallas Stadium; Attendance: 14,339; Referee: Jose Carlos Rivera

April 27, 2013 MLS 8	Vancouver Whitecaps FC	2–2	FC Dallas	Vancouver, BC, Canada
15:00 (PDT)	Koffie (yellow card) 3'; Manneh 72'; Camilo 75'	Recap	O'Brien 9' (o.g.); Hedges 47'; Fernández (yellow card) 81'; Jackson (red card) 78'	Stadium: BC Place; Attendance: 19,667; Referee: Ricardo Salazar

May 4, 2013 MLS 9	Real Salt Lake	2–0	Vancouver Whitecaps FC	Sandy, Utah, U.S.
18:30 (PDT)	Gil 47'; Morales 71'; Wingert (yellow card) 79'	Recap	Reo-Coker (yellow card) 18'; Koffie (yellow card) 87'	Stadium: Rio Tinto Stadium; Attendance: 17,480; Referee: Juan Guzman

May 11, 2013 MLS 10	Vancouver Whitecaps FC	3–1	LA Galaxy	Vancouver, BC, Canada
16:00 (PDT)	Leveron (yellow card) 3'; Teibert 63', 76' (yellow card) 76'; Mattocks 92'	Recap	Zardes 86'	Stadium: BC Place; Attendance: 21,000; Referee: Sorin Stoica

May 18, 2013 MLS 11	Vancouver Whitecaps FC	2–2	Portland Timbers	Vancouver, BC, Canada
16:00 (PDT)	Camilo 24'; Koffie 54'; Reo-Coker (yellow card) 60'	Recap	Johnson (yellow card) 23'; Valeri (yellow card) 33'; Johnson 52' (pen.); Harrington (yellow card) 70'; Danso (red card) 81'; Valencia 84'	Stadium: BC Place; Attendance: 19,823; Referee: Matthew Foerster

June 1, 2013 MLS 12	New York Red Bulls	1–2	Vancouver Whitecaps FC	Harrison, New Jersey, U.S.
16:00 (PDT)	Olave (yellow card) 49' (red card) 75'	Recap	Klazura 51' (o.g.); Harvey 58' (yellow card) 67'; Rochat (yellow card) 70'; Miller 83'	Stadium: Red Bull Arena; Attendance: 19,889

June 8, 2013 MLS 13	Seattle Sounders FC	3–2	Vancouver Whitecaps FC	Seattle, Washington, U.S.
13:00 (PDT)	Rose 9' (yellow card) 52'; Carrasco 70' (pen.); Neagle 81'	Report	Camilo 10', 26'; Harvey (yellow card) 85'	Stadium: CenturyLink Field; Attendance: 53,679; Referee: Hilario Grajeda

June 15, 2013 MLS 14	Vancouver Whitecaps FC	4–3	NE Revolution	Vancouver, BC, Canada
19:00 (PDT)	Camilo 25' (pen.); Miller 39', 68'; Harvey 43'; Teibert (yellow card) 61'; Mitchell (yellow card) 69'; Manneh (yellow card) 76'	Recap	Agudelo 10'; Caldwell (yellow card) 14'; Rowe 20' (yellow card) 93'; Farrell (red card) 23'; Tierney (yellow card) 31'; Imbongo 84'	Stadium: BC Place; Attendance: 20,116; Referee: Juan Guzman

June 19, 2013 MLS 15	Vancouver Whitecaps FC	3–1	Chivas USA	Vancouver, BC, Canada
19:00 (PDT)	Harvey 45'; Camilo 45+3', 81'	Recap	Bowen 7'; Alvarez (yellow card) 40'; Bowen (yellow card) 53'	Stadium: BC Place; Attendance: 16,130; Referee: Ismail Elfath

June 29, 2013 MLS 16	D.C. United	0–1	Vancouver Whitecaps FC	Washington, D.C., U.S.
16:00 (PDT)	Hamid (yellow card) 90'	Recap	Camilo 48'; Koffie (yellow card) 70'	Stadium: RFK Stadium; Attendance: 13,122; Referee: Matthew Foerster

July 3, 2013 MLS 17	Sporting KC	1–1	Vancouver Whitecaps FC	Kansas City, Kansas, U.S.
18:00 (PDT)	Collin 35' (yellow card) 68'	Recap	Camilo 45' (yellow card) 45'	Stadium: Sporting Park; Attendance: Ricardo Salazar; Referee: 20,137

July 6, 2013 MLS 18	Vancouver Whitecaps FC	2–0	Seattle Sounders FC	Vancouver, BC, Canada
20:00 (PDT)	Miller 4'; Mattocks 79'	Recap	Neagle (yellow card) 61'; Hurtado (yellow card) 90'	Stadium: BC Place; Attendance: 22,500; Referee: Hilario Grajeda

July 14, 2013 MLS 19	Vancouver Whitecaps FC	3–1	Chicago Fire	Vancouver, BC, Canada
16:00 (PDT)	Camilo 66', 71'; Manneh 83'	Recap	Patrick Nyarko 90+4'	Stadium: BC Place; Attendance: 20,206; Referee: Allen Chapman

July 20, 2013 MLS 20	LA Galaxy	2–1	Vancouver Whitecaps FC	LA, California, U.S.
19:30 (PDT)	Jose Villarreal 29'; Gyasi Zardes 57'; Juninho (yellow card) 72'	Recap	Camilo 19'; Koffie (yellow card) 32'; Reo-Coker (yellow card) 39'; Davidson (yellow card) 51'	Stadium: Home Depot Center; Attendance: 20,093; Referee: Chris Penso

July 27, 2013 MLS 21	Vancouver Whitecaps FC	0–1	Philadelphia Union	Vancouver, BC, Canada
16:00 (PDT)	Davidson (red card) 8'; Leveron (yellow card) 59'; Koffie (yellow card) 73'	Recap	Keon Daniel (yellow card) 8'; Jack McInerney (yellow card) 25'; Danny Cruz (yellow card) 65'; Antoine Hoppenot 85'	Stadium: BC Place; Attendance: 21,000; Referee: Baldomero Toledo

August 3, 2013 MLS 22	Portland Timbers	1–1	Vancouver Whitecaps FC	Portland, Oregon, U.S.
20:00 (PDT)	Powell (yellow card) 5'; Johnson 49'; Kah (yellow card) 68'	report	Kobayashi (yellow card) 10'; Rusin (yellow card) 17'; Watson (yellow card) 36'; Reo-Coker (yellow card) 66'; Harvey 69'	Stadium: Jeld-Wen Field; Referee: Silviu Petrescu

August 10, 2013 MLS 23	Vancouver Whitecaps FC	2–0	San Jose Earthquakes	Vancouver, BC, Canada
16:30 (PDT)	Camilo 60' (yellow card) 61'; Miller 74'; Teibert (yellow card) 75'	report	Goodson (yellow card) 6'; Baca (yellow card) 28'	Stadium: BC Place; Attendance: 20,151; Referee: Ricardo Salazar

August 14, 2013 MLS 24	Colorado Rapids	2–0	Vancouver Whitecaps FC	Commerce City, Colorado, U.S.
18:00 (PDT)	Brown 36' (yellow card) 51'; Buddle 79'	report	Harvey (yellow card) 71'	Stadium: Dick Sporting Goods Park; Attendance: 16,030; Referee: Jose Carlos Rivero

August 24, 2013 MLS 25	Vancouver Whitecaps FC	0–1	LA Galaxy	Vancouver, BC, Canada
18:00 (PDT)	Koffie (yellow card) 55'; Lee (yellow card) 73'; Reo-Coker (yellow card) 90+1'	report	Donovan 3'	Stadium: BC Place; Attendance: 21,000; Referee: Armando Villareal

September 1, 2013 MLS 26	Vancouver Whitecaps FC	2–2	Chivas USA	Vancouver, BC, Canada
16:00 (PDT)	Lee (yellow card) 57'; Koffie 64'; Heinemann 90+3'	Report	Torres 3', 14'; Borja (yellow card) 42'	Stadium: BC Place; Attendance: 18,767; Referee: David Gantar

September 7, 2013 MLS 27	FC Dallas	3–1	Vancouver Whitecaps FC	Frisco, Texas, U.S.
17:30 (PDT)	Watson 8'; Diaz 87'; Benitez 89'	Report	Kobayashi 4'; Leveron (yellow card) 30'	Stadium: FC Dallas Stadium; Referee: Kevin Stott

September 14, 2013 MLS 28	San Jose Earthquakes	0–0	Vancouver Whitecaps FC	San Jose, California, U.S.
19:30 (PDT)	Gordon (yellow card) 46'; Corrales (yellow card) 63'; Goodson (yellow card) 82'	Report		Stadium: Buck Shaw Stadium; Referee: Jair Marrufo

September 21, 2013 MLS 29	Montreal Impact	0–3	Vancouver Whitecaps FC	Montreal, Quebec, Canada
11:00 (PDT)	Felipe Campanholi Martins (yellow card) 45+1'; Camara (yellow card) 55'	Report	Miller 7' (pen.); Reo-Coker (yellow card) 77'; Lee Young-Pyo (yellow card) 78'; Camilo Sanvezzo 89', 90+1' (yellow card) 90'	Stadium: Saputo Stadium; Attendance: 20,006; Referee: Jorge Gonzalez

September 28, 2013 MLS 30	Vancouver Whitecaps FC	0–1	Real Salt Lake	Vancouver, BC, Canada
16:00 (PDT)	DeMerit (yellow card) 63'; Harvey (yellow card) 80'	Report	Sandoval 9'	Stadium: BC Place; Attendance: 21,000; Referee: Baldomero Toledo

October 6, 2013 MLS 31	Vancouver Whitecaps FC	2–2	Portland Timbers	Vancouver, BC, Canada
17:00 (PDT)	Camilo (yellow card) 44', (goal) 76', 78'; Mitchell (yellow card) 56'	Report	41'Nagbe; (yellow card) 45' Harrington; (yellow card) 74' Ricketts; 77' Johnson; (yellow card) 87' Kah	Stadium: BC Place; Attendance: 20,303; Referee: Silviu Petrescu

October 9, 2013 MLS 32	Seattle Sounders FC	1–4	Vancouver Whitecaps FC	Seattle, Washington, U.S.
19:00 (PDT)	Rosales 69'	Report	Manneh 12', 42', 54'; Mitchell (yellow card) 50'; Reo-Coker 82'	Stadium: CenturyLink Field; Attendance: 38,833; Referee: Juan Guzman

October 19, 2013 MLS 33	Colorado Rapids	3–2	Vancouver Whitecaps FC	Commerce City, Colorado, U.S.
15:00 (PDT)	Gabriel Torres 41' (pen.) 77' Deshorn Brown 51' Nathan Sturgis (yellow card) 69'		Jordan Harvey (yellow card) 11' Kekuta Manneh 32' Camilo Sanvezzo 75' (pen.)	Stadium: Dick's Sporting Goods Park; Attendance: 18,103; Referee: Armando Villarreal

October 26, 2013 MLS 34	Vancouver Whitecaps FC	3–0	Colorado Rapids	Vancouver, BC, Canada
17:00 (PDT)	Camilo Sanvezzo 43', 74', 84' (yellow card) 85'		Nick LaBrocca (yellow card) 51'; Shane O'Neill (yellow card) 83'	Stadium: BC Place; Attendance: 21,000; Referee: Ricardo Salazar

== Canadian Championship ==
The club participated in the four-team Canadian Championship which includes FC Edmonton, Montreal Impact and Toronto FC. The champion of the tournament was awarded the Voyageurs Cup and qualified for the 2013–14 CONCACAF Champions League group stage. Vancouver lost in the finals to Montreal on the away goals rule.

=== Semi-finals ===
April 24 First Leg	Edmonton	2–3	Vancouver	Edmonton, Alberta
16:30PDT	Cox 8'; Nurse 28'; Robert (yellow card) 33'; Hlavaty (yellow card) 88'	Recap	Camilo 5', 83' (pen.) (yellow card) 78'; Teibert (yellow card) 36'; Heinemann 89'	Stadium: Commonwealth Stadium; Attendance: 2,838; Referee: Silviu Petrescu

May 1 Second Leg	Vancouver	2–0 (5–2 agg.)	Edmonton	Vancouver, British Columbia
19:00PDT	Hertzog 58'; Saiko 67' (o.g.)	Recap	Leroy (red card) 51'	Stadium: BC Place; Attendance: 14,892; Referee: Geoff Gamble

=== Finals ===
May 15 First Leg	Montreal	0–0	Vancouver	Montreal, Quebec
19:30 EDT	Camara (yellow card) 25'; Warner (yellow card) 31'; Di Vaio (yellow card) 33'	report	O'Brien (yellow card) 49'	Stadium: Saputo Stadium; Attendance: 12,016; Referee: Silviu Petrescu

May 29 Second Leg	Vancouver	2–2 (2–2 agg.)	Montreal	Vancouver, British Columbia
19:00PDT	Camilo 4'; Kobayashi 69'	Recap	Camara (yellow card) 6', (goal) 84'; Felipe 49'	Stadium: BC Place; Attendance: 18,183; Referee: Drew Fischer

== Cascadia Cup ==
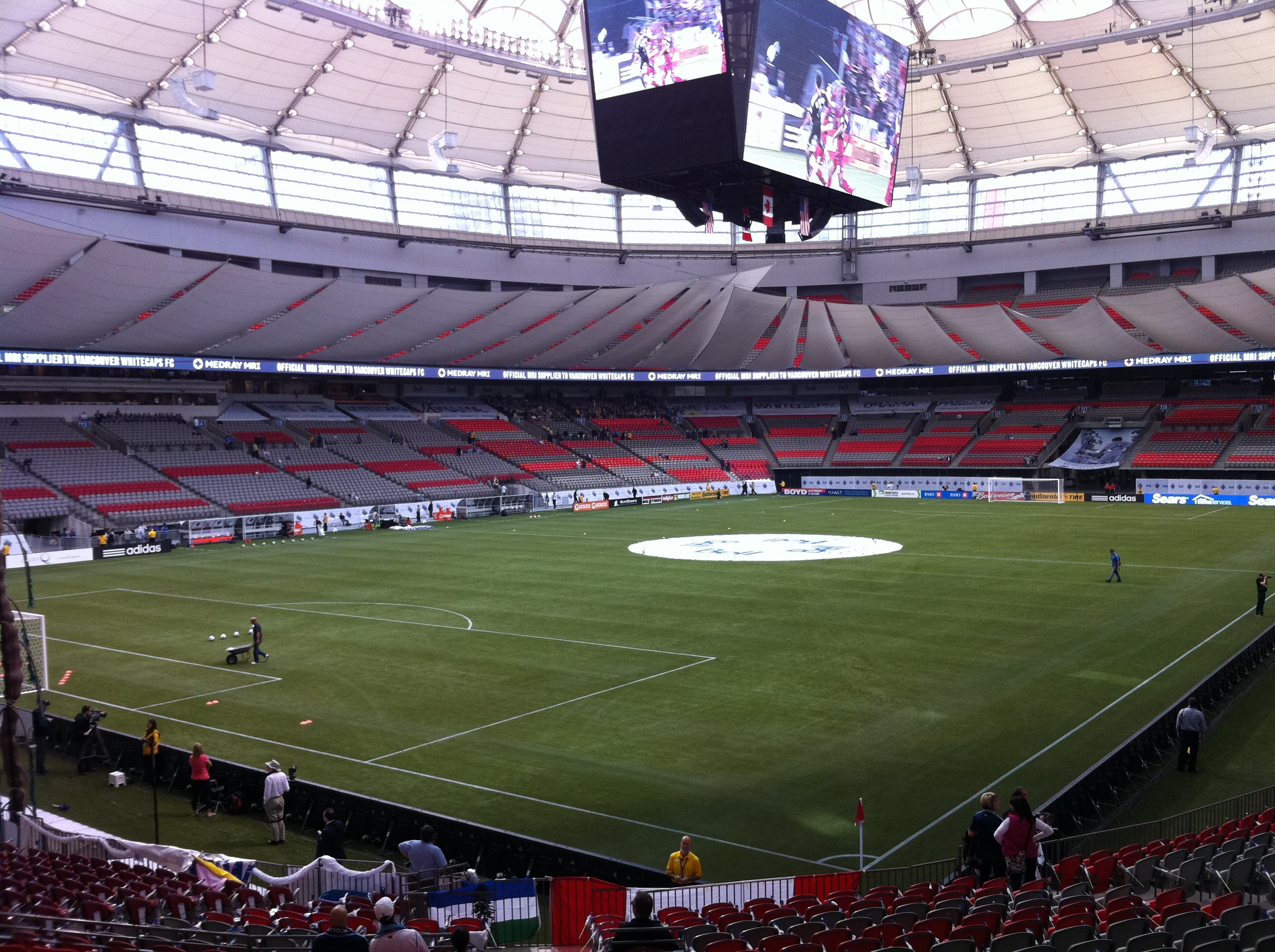
Vancouver Whitecaps FC debut at BC Place on October 2 against Cascadia rivals and expansion cousins, Portland Timbers.

The Whitecaps have had a long-standing rivalry with the Pacific Northwest clubs Seattle Sounders FC and Portland Timbers, dating back to the 1970s when ancestry clubs of the same name played in the original and now-defunct North American Soccer League. The tri-member tournament will continue in 2013.

The winner is determined through league matches between the sides, and the club with the best record against both sides wins the trophy. The 2013 MLS season will see an unbalanced schedule due to an uneven number of teams with the addition of the Montreal Impact. As a result, the Whitecaps will play three matches each against Portland and Seattle. The odd number of matches means Vancouver will host the Timbers twice and Sounders once while visiting Seattle twice Portland once respectively.

2013
Team	Pld	W	L	D	GF	GA	GD	Pts
Vancouver Whitecaps FC	6	2	1	3	13	9	+4	9
Portland Timbers	6	1	1	4	7	7	0	7
Seattle Sounders FC	6	2	3	1	6	10	−4	7

Source: "Cascadia Cup". cascadiacup.soccer. January 2013.

== Regular season statistics ==
=== Appearances and goals ===
No.	Pos	Nat	Player	Total		Major League Soccer		Canadian Championship		MLS Cup Playoffs	
No.	Pos	Nat	Player	Apps	Goals	Apps	Goals	Apps	Goals	Apps	Goals
1	GK	(United States) USA	Joe Cannon	10	-14	10+0	-14	0+0	0	0+0	0
2	DF	(United States) USA	Brad Rusin	20	0	16+3	0	1+0	0	0+0	0
3	DF	(United States) USA	Jordan Harvey	28	4	23+1	4	3+1	0	0+0	0
6	DF	(United States) USA	Jay DeMerit	8	0	7+1	0	0+0	0	0+0	0
7	FW	(Brazil) BRA	Camilo	36	25	27+5	22	4+0	3	0+0	0
8	MF	(England) ENG	Matt Watson	22	0	15+6	0	1+0	0	0+0	0
9	FW	(Scotland) SCO	Kenny Miller	22	8	19+2	8	1+0	0	0+0	0
11	FW	(Jamaica) JAM	Darren Mattocks	24	3	8+12	3	3+1	0	0+0	0
12	DF	(South Korea) KOR	Lee Young-Pyo	33	0	30+2	0	1+0	0	0+0	0
13	MF	(England) ENG	Nigel Reo-Coker	35	1	31+1	1	3+0	0	0+0	0
14	MF	(Japan) JPN	Daigo Kobayashi	32	3	21+9	2	1+1	1	0+0	0
16	DF	(Honduras) HON	Johnny Leverón	22	0	18+0	0	4+0	0	0+0	0
17	FW	(United States) USA	Omar Salgado	0	0	0+0	0	0+0	0	0+0	0
18	GK	(United States) USA	Brad Knighton	15	-19	11+0	-15	4+0	-4	0+0	0
19	FW	(United States) USA	Erik Hurtado	17	0	4+11	0	0+2	0	0+0	0
20	MF	(Ghana) GHA	Aminu Abdallah	0	0	0+0	0	0+0	0	0+0	0
22	GK	(Denmark) DEN	David Ousted	13	-16	13+0	-16	0+0	0	0+0	0
23	FW	(The Gambia) GAM	Kekuta Manneh	21	6	6+14	6	0+1	0	0+0	0
24	DF	(Trinidad and Tobago) TTO	Carlyle Mitchell	15	0	13+2	0	0+0	0	0+0	0
25	DF	(Canada) CAN	Sam Adekugbe	1	0	1+0	0	0+0	0	0+0	0
26	FW	(United States) USA	Corey Hertzog	9	2	6+1	1	0+2	1	0+0	0
27	MF	(Japan) JPN	Jun Marques Davidson	28	0	24+2	0	2+0	0	0+0	0
28	MF	(Ghana) GHA	Gershon Koffie	30	3	21+5	3	4+0	0	0+0	0
29	FW	(United States) USA	Tom Heinemann	16	2	3+11	1	1+1	1	0+0	0
31	MF	(Canada) CAN	Russell Teibert	28	2	19+5	2	4+0	0	0+0	0
32	DF	(United States) USA	Greg Klazura	4	0	1+1	0	2+0	0	0+0	0
34	FW	(Canada) CAN	Caleb Clarke	0	0	0+0	0	0+0	0	0+0	0
36	MF	(Canada) CAN	Bryce Alderson	0	0	0+0	0	0+0	0	0+0	0
39	GK	(Canada) CAN	Simon Thomas	0	0	0+0	0	0+0	0	0+0	0
40	DF	(Ireland) EIR	Andy O'Brien	20	0	16+0	0	4+0	0	0+0	0
	FW	(Brazil) BRA	Paulo Jr.	0	0	0+0	0	0+0	0	0+0	0
	DF	(Switzerland) SUI	Alain Rochat	14	0	11+1	0	2+0	0	0+0	0

Last updated: December 3, 2013
Source: Vancouver Whitecaps FC
Italic: denotes player is no longer with team

=== Goalkeeper stats ===
**No.**	**Nat.**	**Player**	Total				**Major League Soccer**				**Canadian Championship**				**MLS Cup Playoffs**			
**No.**	**Nat.**	**Player**	MIN	**SV**	**GA**	**GAA**	**MIN**	**SV**	**GA**	**GAA**	**MIN**	**SV**	**GA**	**GAA**	**MIN**	**SV**	**GA**	**GAA**
18	(United States)	Brad Knighton	1,350	**45**	**19**	**1.27**	990	34	15	1.36	360	11	4	1.00	0	0	0	0
1	(United States)	Joe Cannon	900	**38**	**14**	**1.40**	900	38	14	1.40	0	0	0	0	0	0	0	0
22	(Denmark)	David Ousted	360	**11**	**4**	**1.00**	360	11	4	1.00	0	0	0	0	0	0	0	0
39	(Canada)	Simon Thomas	0	**0**	**0**	**0**	0	0	0	0	0	0	0	0	0	0	0	0

Updated to match played August 25, 2013
Source: Vancouver Whitecaps FC
Italic: denotes player is no longer with team

=== Top scorer ===
Includes all competitive matches. The list is sorted by shirt number when total goals are equal.

Ran	No.	Pos	Nat	Name	Major League Soccer	MLS Cup Playoffs	Canadian Championship	Total
1	7	FW	(Brazil)	Camilo	18		3	17
2	9	FW	(Scotland)	Kenny Miller	8			7
3	2	DF	(United States)	Jordan Harvey	4			4
4	11	FW	(Jamaica)	Darren Mattocks	3			3
5	31	MF	(Canada)	Russell Teibert	2			2
5	28	MF	(Ghana)	Gershon Koffie	2			2
5	26	FW	(United States)	Corey Hertzog	1		1	2
5	14	MF	(Japan)	Daigo Kobayashi	1		1	2
5	23	FW	(The Gambia)	Kekuta Manneh	6			6
9	29	FW	(United States)	Tommy Heinemann			1	1

=== Top assists ===
Includes all competitive matches. The list is sorted by shirt number when total assists are equal.

Ran	No.	Pos	Nat	Name	Major League Soccer	MLS Cup Playoffs	Canadian Championship	Total
1	31	MF	(Canada)	Russell Teibert	8		1	9
2	7	FW	(Brazil)	Camilo	4			4
2	13	MF	(England)	Nigel Reo-Coker	3		1	4
4	28	MF	(Ghana)	Gershon Koffie	3			3
5	18	GK	(United States)	Brad Knighton	2			2
5	12	DF	(South Korea)	Lee Young-Pyo	2			2
7	2	DF	(United States)	Jordan Harvey	1			1
7	11	FW	(Jamaica)	Darren Mattocks	1			1
7	14	MF	(Japan)	Daigo Kobayashi	1			1
7	19	FW	(United States)	Erik Hurtado	1			1
7	23	FW	(The Gambia)	Kekuta Manneh	1			1
7	29	FW	(United States)	Tom Heinemann	1			1
7	24	DF	(Trinidad and Tobago)	Carlyle Mitchell	1			1
7	26	FW	(United States)	Corey Hertzog	1			1

=== Top minutes played ===
Includes all competitive matches. The list is sorted by shirt number when total minutes are equal.

Ran	No.	Pos	Nat	Name	Major League Soccer	MLS Cup Playoffs	Canadian Championship	Total
1	13	MF	(England)	Nigel Reo-Coker	2,117		270	2,387
2	7	FW	(Brazil)	Camilo	1,762		233	1,995
3	12	DF	(South Korea)	Lee Young-Pyo	1,830		90	1,920
4	31	FW	(Canada)	Russell Teibert	1,443		360	1,803
5	16	DF	(Honduras)	Johnny Leveron	1,440		360	1,800
6	28	MF	(Ghana)	Gershon Koffie	1,389		327	1,716
7	27	MF	(Japan)	Jun Marques Davidson	1,444		180	1,624
8	3	DF	(United States)	Jordan Harvey	1,272		297	1,569
9	40	DF	(Republic of Ireland)	Andy O'Brien	1,141		360	1,501
10	9	FW	(Scotland)	Kenny Miller	1,316		73	1,389
11	14	MF	(Japan)	Daigo Kobayashi	1,256		99	1,355
12	19	GK	(United States)	Brad Knighton	990		360	1,350
13	2	DF	(United States)	Brad Rusin	1,182		90	1,272
14			(Switzerland)	**Alain Rochat**	970		169	1,139
15	8	MF	(England)	Matt Watson	838		90	928
16	11	FW	(Jamaica)	Darren Mattocks	708		208	916
17	1	GK	(United States)	Joe Cannon	900			900
18	24	DF	(Trinidad and Tobago)	Carlyle Mitchell	549			549
19	26	FW	(United States)	Corey Hertzog	428		70	498
20	19	FW	(United States)	Erik Hurtado	439		27	466
21	23	FW	(The Gambia)	Kekuta Manneh	381		29	410
22	22	GK	(Denmark)	David Ousted	360			360
23	32	DF	(United States)	Greg Klazura	85		180	265
24	29	FW	(United States)	Tommy Heinemann	152		98	250
25	6	DF	(United States)	Jay DeMerit	8			8

=== Starting 11 ===
No.	Pos.	Nat.	Name	MS	Notes
19	GK	(United States)	Knighton	11	Cannon 10 starts Ousted 4 starts
12	RB	(South Korea)	Lee	22	
40	CB	(Republic of Ireland)	O'Brien	14	Mitchell 6 starts
6	CB	(United States)	DeMerit	1	Leveron 16 starts Rusin 13 starts
3	LB	(United States)	Harvey	15	
27	RM	(Japan)	Davidson	17	Kobayashi 16 starts
28	LW	(Ghana)	Koffie	15	
13	RW	(England)	Reo-Coker	23	Watson 8 starts
31	FW	(Canada)	Teibert	16	Hertzog 6 starts
7	LM	(Brazil)	Camilo	19	Hurtado 1 start
9	SS	(Scotland)	Kenny Miller	15	Mattocks 7 starts

Last updated: August 25, 2013

=== Captains ===
Includes all competitive matches. The list is sorted by shirt number when games are equal

No.	Pos.	Name	Games
13	MF	(England) Nigel Reo-Coker	15
9	FW	(Scotland) Kenny Miller	13
6	DF	(United States) Jay DeMerit	1
12	DF	(South Korea) Lee Young-Pyo	1

Last updated: August 25, 2013

=== Injuries ===
Players in bold are still out from their injuries

Date	No.	Pos.	Name	Injury	Note	Recovery time
March 2	6	DF	**Jay DeMerit**	Achilles	Ruptured Achillies	6–8 Months
April 5	9	FW	Kenny Miller	Hamstring	Tightness	4–6 Weeks
April 15	26	FW	Corey Hertzog	Head Knock	Dizziness	1–3 Weeks
May 2	3	DF	Brad Rusin	Concussion	Dizziness	2–3 weeks
May 4	17	FW	**Omar Salgado**	Right Foot	Tendon Repair	8–10 Weeks
May 11	14	MF	Daigo Kobayashi	Left Foot	Sprained	1–3 weeks
May 11	7	FW	Camilo	Quad	Stiffness	1–3 days
March 16	3	DF	Brad Rusin	Hamstring	Pulled	2–4 Weeks
May 29	28	MF	Gershon Koffie	Quad	Strain	1–2 Weeks
June 1	32	DF	Greg Klazura	Lower Body	Knock	1–2 days
June 8	40	DF	**Andy O'Brien**	Hamstring	Strain	1–3 weeks
July 6	26	FW	Corey Hertzog	Left Ankle	Sprain	2–3 days
July 23	11	FW	Darren Mattocks	Knee	Minor Surgery	4–6 weeks
August 3	3	DF	**Brad Rusin**	Ankle	Sprained	4–6 weeks

=== Disciplinary record ===
Includes all competitive matches. The list is sorted by position, and then shirt number.

**N**	**P**	**Nat.**	**Name**	**Major League Soccer**			**Canadian Championship**			**MLS Playoffs**			**Others**			Total			Notes
**N**	**P**	**Nat.**	**Name**	Yellow card	Second yellow card	Red card	Yellow card	Second yellow card	Red card	Yellow card	Second yellow card	Red card	Yellow card	Second yellow card	Red card	Yellow card	Second yellow card	Red card	Notes
1	GK	(United States)	Joe Cannon																
18	GK	(United States)	Brad Knighton																
39	GK	(Canada)	Simon Thomas																
2	DF	(United States)	Brad Rusin																
3	DF	(United States)	Jordan Harvey	3												3			
6	DF	(United States)	Jay DeMerit																
12	DF	(South Korea)	Lee Young-Pyo	1												1			
15	DF	(Honduras)	Johnny Leveron	2												2			Suspended for May 18 match vs. Portland Timbers
19	DF	(Trinidad and Tobago)	Carlyle Mitchell	1												1			
32	DF	(United States)	Greg Klazura																
40	DF	(Ireland)	Andy O'Brien				1									1			
8	MF	(England)	Matt Watson																
13	MF	(England)	Nigel Reo-Coker	7												7			Suspended for June 1 match vs New York Red Bulls; Suspended for Aug 1 match vs Chivas USA
14	MF	(Japan)	Daigo Kobayashi																
20	MF	(Ghana)	Aminu Abdallah																
27	MF	(Japan)	Jun Marques Davidson	1		1										1		**1**	Suspended for August 3 match vs Portland Timbers
28	MF	(Ghana)	Gershon Koffie	6												6			Suspended for August 3 match vs Portland Timbers
31	MF	(Canada)	Russell Teibert	3			1									4			
36	MF	(Canada)	Bryce Alderson																
7	FW	(Brazil)	Camilo	1			1									2			
9	FW	(Scotland)	Kenny Miller																
11	FW	(Jamaica)	Darren Mattocks																
17	FW	(United States)	Omar Salgado																
19	FW	(United States)	Erik Hurtado																
23	FW	(The Gambia)	Kekuta Manneh	1												1			Suspended for June 19 match vs New England Revolution
26	FW	(United States)	Corey Hertzog																
29	FW	(United States)	Tom Heinemann																
34	FW	(Canada)	Caleb Clarke																
0	FW	(Brazil)	**Paulo Jr.**																
0	DF	(Switzerland)	**Alain Rochat**	2												2			

Last updated: August 25, 2013
Source: Competitive matches
Ordered by (red card) , (second yellow card) and (yellow card)
(yellow card) = Number of bookings; (second yellow card) = Number of sending offs after a second yellow card; (red card) = Number of sending offs by a direct red card.

Italic: denotes no longer with club.

== Recognition ==
=== MLS Team of the Week ===
Week	Player/Manager	Nation	Position	Report
2	Kenny Miller	SCO	FW	MLS Team of the Week: 2
2	Daigo Kobayashi	JPN	MF	MLS Team of the Week: 2
10	Russell Teibert	CAN	MF	MLS Team of the Week: 10
14	Lee Young-Pyo	KOR	DF	MLS Team of the Week: 14
15	Camilo	BRA	FW	MLS Team of the Week: 15
16	Kenny Miller	SCO	FW	MLS Team of the Week: 16
16	Russell Teibert	CAN	MF	MLS Team of the Week: 16
17	Camilo	BRA	FW	MLS Team of the Week: 17
19	Brad Knighton	USA	GK	MLS Team of the Week: 19
20	Camilo	BRA	FW	MLS Team of the Week: 20
24	Nigel Reo-Coker	ENG	MF	MLS Team of the Week: 24

=== MLS Player of the Week ===
Week	Player/Manager	Nation	Position	Report
16	Kenny Miller	SCO	FW	MLS Player of the Week: 16
17	Camilo	BRA	FW	MLS Player of the Week: 17
19	Brad Knighton	USA	GK	MLS Player of the Week: 19
20	Camilo	BRA	FW	MLS Player of the Week: 20

=== MLS Player of the Month ===
Week	Player/Manager	Nation	Position	Report
16	Camilo	BRA	FW	MLS Player of the Month: July

=== MLS All-Stars 2013 ===
Position	Player	Note
FW	(Brazil) Camilo	2013 ALL-STAR

== MLS Reserves ==
=== West ===
Pos	Club	Pld	W	L	T	GF	GA	GD	Pts	PPG
1	LA Galaxy Reserves (C)	10	5	1	4	16	9	+7	19	1.90
2	Vancouver Whitecaps Reserves	10	4	2	4	21	15	+6	16	1.60
3	Real Salt Lake Reserves	14	6	4	4	14	13	+1	22	1.57
4	Chivas USA Reserves	12	5	6	1	23	24	-1	16	1.33
5	San Jose Earthquakes Reserves	10	4	5	1	18	12	+6	13	1.30
6	Colorado Rapids Reserves	14	5	7	2	16	20	-4	17	1.21
7	Seattle Sounders FC Reserves	12	4	6	2	17	21	-4	14	1.17
8	Portland Timbers Reserves	14	4	7	3	16	23	-7	15	1.07

=== Season games ===
April 14, 2013 2013 Major League Soccer Reserves 1	Whitecaps	2–0	Real Salt Lake	Vancouver, BC, Canada
11:00 (PDT)	Koffie (yellow card) 25'; Harvey 44'; Hurtado 85'	Recap		Stadium: UBC Thunderbird Stadium; Attendance: 277; Referee: Paul Ward

May 7, 2013 2013 Major League Soccer Reserves 2	Colorado Rapids	1–2	Whitecaps	Denver, CO, U.S.
10:00 (PDT)	Cascio 41'	Recap	Harvey (yellow card) 12'; Manneh 21'; Manneh (yellow card) 35'; Heinemann 74'	Stadium: DSG Park Field 20

May 19, 2013 2013 Major League Soccer Reserves 3	Whitecaps	1–1	Portland Timbers	Vancouver, BC, Canada
10:00 (PDT)	Heinemann 26'; Mitchell (yellow card) 56'; Tommy Heinemann (yellow card) 81'	Recap	Zemanski (yellow card) 81'; Zizzo 82'; Zemanski (red card) 91'	Stadium: UBC Thunderbird Stadium

June 5, 2013 2013 Major League Soccer Reserves 4	Whitecaps	3–3	Chivas USA	Vancouver, BC, Canada
11:00 (PDT)	Kekuta Manneh 6'; Tommy Heinemann 33'; Tommy Heinemann 45'	Recap	Soto 58'; Rivera 70'; Rivera 83'	Stadium: UBC Thunderbird Stadium

June 22, 2013 2013 Major League Soccer Reserves 5	Richmond Kickers	1–1	Whitecaps	Richmond, VA, U.S.
16:00 (PDT)	Ngwenya 54'	Recap	Clement (yellow card) 17'; Manneh 23'; Manneh (yellow card) 50'; Hurtado (yellow card) 57'	Stadium: Richmond City Stadium

July 7, 2013 2013 Major League Soccer Reserves 6	Whitecaps	4–0	Seattle Sounders FC	Vancouver, BC, Canada
11:00 (PDT)	Hurtado 56'; Adekugbe 63'; Heinemann 74'; Heinemann 90+3'	Recap	Marc Bates (yellow card) 25'; Sammy Ochoa (yellow card) 64'	Stadium: TBC; Attendance: 1,077; Referee: Rubinco Smilev

July 16, 2013 2013 Major League Soccer Reserves 7	Real Salt Lake	3–2	Whitecaps	Salt Lake City, UT, U.S.
09:30 (PDT)	Sebastian Velasquez 64'; Benji Lopez 84'; Paul Pienda 89'	Recap	Manneh (yellow card) 2'; Cobby 6'; Manneh 55'; Abdallah (yellow card) 55'	Stadium: America First Stadium; Attendance: 457

July 23, 2013 2013 Major League Soccer Reserves 8	Whitecaps	1–2	Richmond Kickers	Vancouver, BC, Canada
16:00 (PDT)	Manneh 90+1'	Recap	Matthew Delicate 15'; Conor Shanosky 63'	Stadium: UBC Thunderbird Stadium; Attendance: 177; Referee: Alain Ruch

August 4, 2013 2013 Major League Soccer Reserves 9	Portland Timbers	v	Whitecaps	Portland, OR, U.S.
18:00 (PDT)				Stadium: Jeld-Wen Field

August 26, 2013 2013 Major League Soccer Reserves 10	Seattle Sounders FC	v	Whitecaps	Seattle, WA, U.S.
19:00 (PDT)				Stadium: Starfire Sports Complex

=== Exhibition games ===
March 14, 2013 2013 Reserve Exhibition 1	UBC	3–0	Whitecaps	Vancouver, BC, Canada
13:00 (PDT)				Stadium: Thunderbird Stadium

March 16, 2013 2013 Reserve Exhibition 2	University of Victoria	0–3	Whitecaps	Victoria, BC, Canada
13:00 (PDT)		Recap	Camilo 36'; Hurtado 39'; Heinemann 77'	Stadium: UVIC Centennial Stadium

March 19, 2013 2013 Reserve Exhibition 3	Simon Fraser University	1–3	Whitecaps	Vancouver, BC, Canada
13:00 (PDT)	Basso 15'	Recap	Hertzog 9'; Teibert 29'; Hertzog 41'; Sampson (yellow card) 66'	Stadium: Thunderbird Stadium

March 26, 2013 2013 Reserve Exhibition 4	Whitecaps	4–2	FC Edmonton	Vancouver, BC, Canada
13:00 (PDT)	Paulo Jr. 30'; Heinemann 51'; Sampson (yellow card) 55'; Manneh 62'; Abdallah (red card); Hertzog 87'	Recap	Leroy (yellow card) 35'; Cox 54'; Knight 73'; Hlavaty (yellow card) 88'	Stadium: UBC Thunderbird Stadium

April 2, 2013 2013 Reserve Exhibition 5	Trinity Western	1–6	Whitecaps	Vancouver, BC, Canada
16:00 (PDT)	Spencer Schmidt 73'	Recap	Heinemann 8'; Manneh 16'; Hertzog 17'; Watson (yellow card) 22'; Heinemann 31'; Teibert 33'; Sampson 72'	Stadium: UBC Thunderbird Stadium

April 16, 2013 2013 Reserve Exhibition 6	Vancouver Whitecaps FC	1–1	Washington Huskies	Vancouver, BC, Canada
19:00 (PDT)	Aminu Abdallah 31'	Recap	James Moberg 72'	Stadium: UBC Thunderbird Stadium

=== Reserves season stats ===
Updated as of August 1, 2013

Field players

Reserve Season
Player	G	A
Tommy Heinemann	6	1
Kekuta Manneh	5	2
Erik Hurtado	2	3
Sam Adekugbe	1	1
Marco Bustos	0	2
Jordan Harvey	1	0
Kevin Cobby	1	0
Corey Hertzog	0	1
Greg Klazura	0	1
Daigo Kobayashi	0	1

Updated as of August 1, 2013

Goalkeepers

Reserve Season
Player	W	L	D	Mins	GAA	SO
Brad Knighton	2	0	0	235	0.50	1
David Ousted	1	2	0	270	1.67	1
Simon Thomas	0	0	3	180	2.67	0
Joe Cannon	0	0	0	45	0.00	0

== Player salaries ==
2013 Roster
Player	$
Kenny Miller	$1,114,992
Jay DeMerit	$325,000
Daigo Kobayashi	$225,000
Camilo Sanvezzo	$210,000
Nigel Reo-Coker	$200,000
Andy O'Brien	$200,000
Lee Young-Pyo	$196,900
Joe Cannon	$180,500
Gershon Koffie	$165,000
Brad Rusin	$120,000
Darren Mattocks	$120,000
Jordan Harvey	$112,500
Omar Salgado	$95,000
Jun Marques Davidson	$74,250
Matt Watson	$68,250
Brad Knighton	$66,000
Bryce Alderson	$65,000
Russell Teibert	$60,000
Johnny Leveron	$60,000
Kekuta Manneh	$55,000
Tom Heinemann	$51,975
Corey Hertzog	$50,004
Caleb Clarke	$46,500
Aminu Abdallah	$46,500
Erik Hurtado	$46,500
Greg Klazura	$46,500
Carlyle Mitchell	$46,500
Adam Clement	$35,125
Simon Thomas	$35,125

== U23/PDL Season ==
There are supporter groups for the 2013 PDL season in Vancouver, Seattle, Portland, Bremerton, and Victoria. For information for things such as tailgating, away travel, and tifo see the associated forums, where they exist, for the Vancouver Southsiders, Emerald City Supporters (Seattle), Timbers Army (Portland), Kitsap Blue Guard, Kitsap Hellcats, and Lake Side Buoys (Victoria – Facebook). The BC based supporters groups sponsor the Juan de Fuca Plate and the Washington State teams play for the Ruffneck Cup.

Pos	Club	Pld	W	L	T	GF	GA	GD	Pts
1	Victoria Highlanders	14	8	2	4	31	18	+13	28
2	Portland Timbers U23s	14	7	3	4	18	12	+6	25
3	Vancouver Whitecaps FC U-23	14	7	4	3	30	22	+8	24
4	Seattle Sounders FC U-23	14	4	5	5	18	23	−5	17
5	Kitsap Pumas	14	3	4	7	22	24	−2	16
6	Washington Crossfire	14	4	7	3	15	18	−3	15
7	North Sound SeaWolves	14	2	10	2	15	32	−17	8

=== Results summary ===
Overall								Home						Away					
Pld	Pts	W	L	D	GF	GA	GD	W	L	D	GF	GA	GD	W	L	D	GF	GA	GD
14	24	7	4	3	30	22	+8	4	1	2	16	9	+7	3	3	1	14	13	+1

Last updated: July 17, 2013
Pld = Matches played; Pts = Points; W = Matches won; T = Matches tied; L = Matches lost; GF = Goals for; GA = Goals against; GD = Goal difference

=== Results ===
Round	1	2	3	4	5	6	7	8	9	10	11	12	13	14
Ground	H	H	A	H	A	A	A	A	A	H	H	H	H	A
Result	W	L	L	W	W	L	W	D	L	W	D	D	W	W

Updated to match(es) played on July 17, 2013. Source:
A = Away; H = Home; W = Win; D = Draw; L = Loss

=== Squad stats ===
	2013 PDL season
Games played	14
Games won	7
Games drawn	3
Games lost	4
Goals scored	30
Goals conceded	22
Goal difference	+8
Clean sheets	1
Shots	141
Shots on goal	47
Saves	44
Fouls	128
Offsides	27
Corners	41
Yellow cards	17
Red cards	0
Goals by FW	20
Goals by MF	9
Goals by DF	1
Goals by starters	27
Goals by subs	3

=== PDL regular season ===
May 10, 2013 PDL 1	Vancouver U23	2–1	Kitsap	Vancouver, BC, Canada
19:00 (PDT)	Bassi (yellow card) 31'; Hundal 69'; DeBoice 71'; Marquez (yellow card) 78'	Recap	Jansen 6'; Sampson (yellow card) 12'; Jansen (yellow card) 36'; Brim (yellow card) 90'	Stadium: UBC Thunderbird Stadium; Attendance: 77; Referee: Alain Ruch

May 17, 2013 PDL 2	Vancouver U23	2–3	Victoria Highalnders FC	Vancouver, BC, Canada
19:00 (PDT)	Cousens 52'; Plavsic (yellow card) 61'; Jhutty (yellow card) 64'; Cousens 87'	Recap	O'Neill (yellow card) 32'; Hughes 50'; O'Neill 53'; Hughes 81'	Stadium: UBC Thunderbird Stadium; Attendance: 105; Referee: Phil Barrington

May 23, 2013 PDL 3	Portland	2–0	Vancouver U23	Portland, WA, U.S.
14:00 (PDT)	J.J. Greer (yellow card) 17'; Bryan Gallego (yellow card) 56'; Eric Miller 63'; Nick Palodichuk (yellow card) 73'; Reinaldo Brenes 75'	Recap	Sasa Plavsic (yellow card) 56'; Cam Hundal (yellow card) 78'; Derrick Bassi (yellow card) 84'	Stadium: JELD-WEN Field; Attendance: 3,370; Referee: Jason Perlewitz

May 26, 2013 PDL 4	Vancouver U23	5–1	North Sound	Vancouver, BC, Canada
11:00 (PDT)	Harry Lakhan 2'; Harry Lakhan 24'; Spencer DeBoice 37'; Harry Lakhan (yellow card) 57'; Aminu Abdallah (yellow card) 69'; Spencer DeBoice 84'; Niall Cousens 90'	Recap	Victor Vasquez (yellow card) 29'; Brad Jacobson 39'; Victor Vasquez (red card) 61'; Braxton Griffin (yellow card) 64'; Graham Reid (yellow card) 70'	Stadium: UBC Thunderbird Stadium; Attendance: 53; Referee: Alain Ruch

May 31, 2013 PDL 5	Victoria Highlander FC	3–5	Vancouver U23	Victoria, BC, Canada
15:00 (PDT)	Jordie Hughes 9'; Brett Levis 15'; Jordie Hughes 56'	Recap	Harpreet Lakhan 25'; Niall Cousens 37'; Aminu Abdallah 46'; Gagandeep Dosanjh 58'; Ethen Sampson (yellow card) 73'; Michael Winter (yellow card) 82'; Niall Cousens 87'	Stadium: Royal Athletic Park; Attendance: 2,044; Referee: Evan Fryer

June 2, 2013 PDL 6	Seattle U23	1–0	Vancouver U23	Sumner, WA, U.S.
15:00 (PDT)	Luis Esteves (yellow card) 50'; Luis Esteves 64'	Recap	Derrick Bassi (yellow card) 84'	Stadium: Sunset Stadium; Attendance: 173; Referee: Scott Conner

June 7, 2013 PDL 7	North Sound	2–3	Vancouver U23	Edmonds, WA, U.S.
19:30 (PDT)		Recap		Stadium: Edmonds Woodway High School; Attendance: 65; Referee: Ben Oakley

June 8, 2013 PDL 8	Kitsap	2–2	Vancouver U23	Bremerton, WA, U.S.
19:00 (PDT)	Kasra Kiarash 5'; Kasra Kiarash 45'	Recap	Harry Lakhan 37'; Niall Cousens 71'	Stadium: Gordon Park Field; Attendance: 101; Referee: Ben Oakley

June 12, 2013 PDL 9	Washington	2–0	Vancouver U23	Redmond, WA, U.S.
19:00 (PDT)	James Moberg 22'; Ben Fisk 82'	Recap	Marco Visintin (yellow card) 42'	Stadium: Redmond High School; Attendance: 75; Referee: Chuck Spaniola

June 21, 2013 PDL 10	Vancouver U23	4–2	Seattle U23	Vancouver, BC, Canada
19:00 (PDT)	Bobby Jhutty 13'; Bobby Jhutty 32'; Bobby Jhutty 65'; Harry Lakhan 68'	Recap	Sean Okoli 24'; Michael Harris (yellow card) 53'; Sean Okoli 61'; Michael Gallagher (yellow card) 64'	Stadium: UBC Thunderbird Stadium; Attendance: 77; Referee: Kent Waechter

June 28, 2013 PDL 11	Vancouver U23	1–1	Victoria Highlanders FC	Vancouver, BC, Canada
19:00 (PDT)	Sasa Plavsic 23'; Niall Cousens (yellow card) 45'; Niall Cousens (red card) 74'; Micheal Winter (yellow card) 89'	Recap	Brett Levis 40'; Andrew Ravenhill (yellow card) 56'	Stadium: Thunderbird Stadium; Attendance: 117; Referee: Phil Barrington

July 12, 2013 PDL 12	Vancouver U23	1–1	Portland	Vancouver, BC, Canada
19:00 (PDT)	Colton O'Neill 23'	Recap	Zack Foxhoven 25'	Stadium: UBC Thunderbird Stadium; Attendance: 63; Referee: Darnell Smith

July 14, 2013 PDL 13	Vancouver U23	1–0	Washington	Vancouver, BC, Canada
16:00 (PDT)	Niall Cousens 14'	Recap		Stadium: UBC Thunderbird Stadium; Attendance: 77; Referee: Juan Marquez

July 17, 2013 PDL 14	North Sound	1–4	Vancouver U23	Edmonds, WA, U.S.
19:30 (PDT)	Bradley Jacobson 15'	Recap	Niall Cousens 20'; Cam Hundal 57'; Sasa Plasvic 77'; Cam Hundal 82'	Stadium: Edmonds Woodway High School; Attendance: 65; Referee: Chuck Spaniola

=== PDL Playoffs ===
July 23, 2013 2013 PDL Playoffs 1	Portland	v	Vancouver U23	Portland, WA, U.S.
22:00 (PDT)				Stadium: Doc Harris Highschool

=== PDL season stats ===
Updated as of July 17, 2013

Field players

Reserve Season
Player	G	A
Niall Cousens	8	4
Harpreet Lakhan	6	2
Cam Hundal	4	4
Bobby Jhutty	3	1
Spencer DeBoice	3	0
Sasa Plasvic	2	1
Gagan Dosanjh	1	1
Marco Visintin	0	2
Carlos Marquez	0	2
Aminu Abdallah	1	0
Sam Adekugbe	0	1
Micheal Winter	1	0
Yassin Essa	0	1
Colton O'Neill	1	0

Updated as of July 17, 2013

Goalkeepers

Reserve Season
Player	W	L	D	Mins	GAA	SO
Sean Melvin	3	1	0	360	1.50	0
Simon Thomas	3	2	1	540	1.83	0
Marco Carducci	1	0	2	270	0.67	1

== Players ==
Name	Previous Team
Sam Adekugbe	Whitecaps FC U-18 Residency
Emmanuel Adjetey*	Charleston Battery
Derrick Bassi	SFU
Peter Bow	Langara
Marco Bustos	Whitecaps FC U-18 Residency
Marco Carducci	Whitecaps FC U-16 Residency
Niall Cousens	UBC
Spencer DeBoice	Whitecaps FC U-18 Residency
Gagan Dosanjh	UBC
Yassin Essa	Whitecaps FC U-18 Residency
James Farenhorst	Trinity Western
Ben Fisk*	Charleston Battery
Kianz Froese	Whitecaps FC U-18 Residency
Cam Hundal	UVIC
Bobby Jhutty	Douglas
Harry Lakhan	UBC
Carlos Marquez	Whitecaps FC U-18 Residency
Sean Melvin	Whitecaps FC U-18 Residency
Colton O'Neill	UCFV
Sasa Plavsic	UCFV
Ethan Sampson	ASD Cape Town
Marco Visintin	UBC
Michael Winter	SFU

- On loan

== Juan de Fuca Plate ==
The Juan de Fuca Plate is a supporter-sponsored competition for British Columbian clubs in the United Soccer Leagues Premier Development League (USL PDL), a semi-professional league with clubs in Canada, the United States, and the Caribbean.

Founded in 2012 by supporters of the Vancouver Whitecaps and Victoria Highlanders, the Juan de Fuca Plate is meant to spur interest across British Columbia in soccer at the semi-professional level, and to inspire good-natured rivalry between the competing cities. Standings in regular season games between all USL PDL teams in British Columbia count towards the championship. Every year, the winner will receive the Juan de Fuca Plate.

For the 2013 USL PDL season, teams competing for the Juan de Fuca Plate will be the Victoria Highlanders and the Vancouver Whitecaps Residency U-23 team. The first game of the 2013 Juan de Fuca Plate will take place May 17, 2013 at UBC Thunderbird Stadium in Vancouver, British Columbia. The first Juan de Fuca Plate match was on May 13, 2012, at Royal Athletic Park in Victoria, British Columbia between the Whitecaps U-23s and the Highlanders. The Plate was first awarded July 11 at Swangard Stadium in Burnaby, British Columbia to the victorious team, the Vancouver Whitecaps FC U-23s.

Past Champions:
2012– Vancouver Whitecaps FC U23
2013– Vancouver Whitecaps FC U23

Pos	Team	GP	W	L	D	GF	GA	GD	Pts
1	Vancouver Whitecaps FC U-23	3	1	1	1	8	7	+1	4
2	Victoria Highlanders	3	1	1	1	7	8	−1	4

=== Plate Games ===
May 17, 2013 PDL 2	Vancouver U23	2–3	Victoria Highlanders FC	Vancouver, BC, Canada
19:00 (PDT)	Cousens 52'; Plavsic (yellow card) 61'; Jhutty (yellow card) 64'; Cousens 87'	Recap	O'Neill (yellow card) 32'; Hughes 50'; O'Neill 53'; Hughes 81'	Stadium: Thunderbird Stadium; Attendance: 105; Referee: Phil Barrington

May 31, 2013 PDL 5	Victoria Highlanders FC	3–5	Vancouver U23	Victoria, BC, Canada
15:00 (PDT)	Jordie Hughes 9'; Brett Levis 15'; Jordie Hughes 56'	Recap	Harpreet Lakhan 25'; Niall Cousens 37'; Aminu Abdallah 46'; Gagan Dosanjh 58'; Ethen Sampson (yellow card) 73'; Michael Winter (yellow card) 82'; Niall Cousens 87'	Stadium: Royal Athletic Park; Attendance: 2,044; Referee: Evan Fryer

June 28, 2013 PDL 11	Vancouver U23	1–1	Victoria Highlanders FC	Vancouver, BC, Canada
19:00 (PDT)	Sasa Plavsic 23'; Niall Cousens (yellow card) 45'; Niall Cousens (red card) 74'; Michael Winter (yellow card) 89'	Recap	Brett Levis 40'; Andrew Ravenhill (yellow card) 56'	Stadium: Thunderbird Stadium; Attendance: 117; Referee: Phil Barrington

=== Juan de Fuca Plate Scoring ===
Updated as of July 5, 2013

Field players

PDL Season
Player	Team	G	A
Niall Cousens	Van	4	1
Jordie Hughes	Vic	4	1
Harpreet Lakhan	Van	1	2
Brett Levis	Vic	2	1
Sasa Plavsic	Van	1	1
Gagan Dosanjh	Van	1	1
Aminu Abdallah	Van	1	0
Riley O'Neil	Vic	1	0
Craig Gorman	Vic	0	1
Cam Hundal	Van	0	1
Tyler Hughes	Vic	0	1
Marco Visintin	Van	0	1
