= Kekuta Manneh =

Gambian soccer player (born 1994)

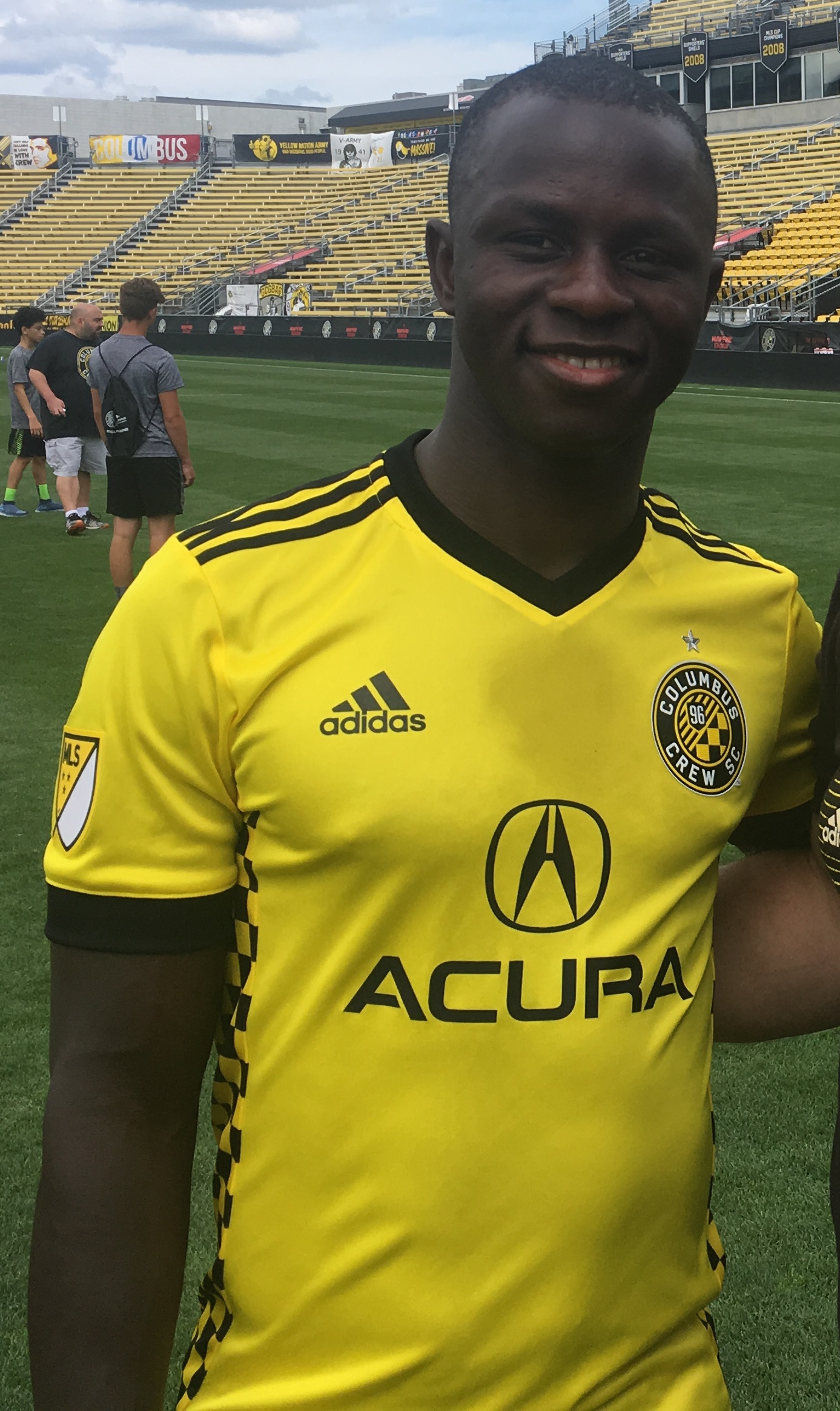
- Manneh in 2017

Personal information
- Date of birth: 30 December 1994 (age 31)
- Place of birth: Bakau, The Gambia
- Height: 1.75 m (5 ft 9 in)
- Positions: Winger; forward

Youth career
- 2010–2011: Texas Rush
- 2011–2012: Lonestar SC

Senior career*
Years	Team	Apps	(Gls)
2009–2010	Steve Biko	12	(17)
2012	Austin Aztex	12	(10)
2013–2017	Vancouver Whitecaps FC	101	(22)
2017	Columbus Crew	19	(4)
2018	Pachuca	1	(0)
2018–2019	St. Gallen	7	(0)
2019–2020	FC Cincinnati	29	(4)
2020	New England Revolution	6	(1)
2021	Austin FC	16	(0)
2022	San Antonio FC	0	(0)
2023	Pacific FC	19	(2)
- * Club domestic league appearances and goals as of October 7, 2023

Kekuta Manneh (born 30 December 1994) is a Gambian and American professional footballer who plays as a winger. He spent most of his career in Major League Soccer for several teams, including Vancouver Whitecaps FC and FC Cincinnati.

== Club career ==
=== Youth and amateur ===
Manneh began his career at the several youth academies, including Gilcock Academy, in Gambia before moving to the GFA League First Division, the nation's top league. After leaving Africa in 2010, Manneh led second-division Georgia Rush to the state cup quarter-finals and played for Texas Rush before signing with Lonestar Soccer Club, another youth club from Texas, for the 2011 season. Both clubs compete as part of the U.S. Soccer Development Academy. In 2010, Manneh scored 35 goals in 23 matches for the Rush. Because of his performance with the Rush, Manneh was named to the 2010 Disney's Soccer Showcase All-Star Team and was given a week-long training stint with the Chelsea F.C. academy. For Lonestar SC, Manneh scored 21 goals in 16 matches. In October 2011, Manneh was observed by a scout from Arsenal in a match against the FC Dallas Development Academy. Following his successful season with Lonestar Soccer Club, Manneh signed for the Austin Aztex of the Premier Development League and scored 10 goals in 12 regular season matches, including a 4-goal performance against the Texas Dutch Lions on matchday 5.

=== Professional ===
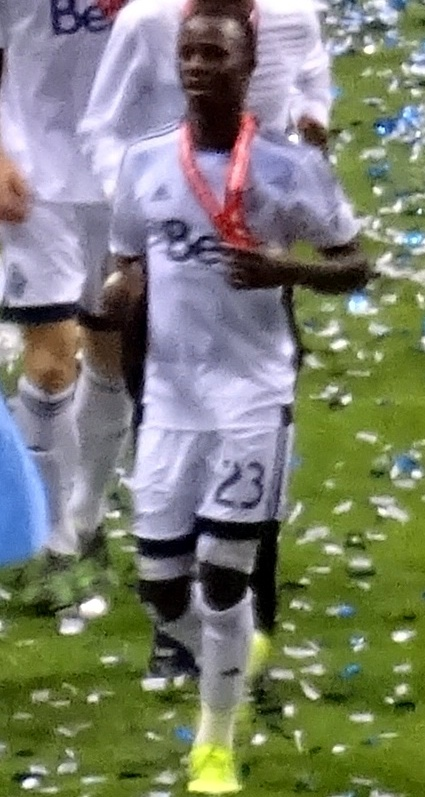
Manneh celebrating the 2015 Canadian Championship

Before coming to the United States in 2010, Manneh played for Steve Biko Football Club of the GFA League First Division, the highest level of football in the Gambia. Manneh helped the club finish second in the league in 2009 by scoring 17 goals in 12 matches. Despite successful trials with top clubs in the Gambia, Manneh decided to move to the United States and join the Texas-based academies. In 2012, it was reported that Manneh was on trial with the reigning Major League Soccer champions, the Los Angeles Galaxy but was ultimately not signed to a contract. Manneh had also trained with the Colorado Rapids and clubs in England and Germany. In January 2013, Manneh signed a Generation Adidas contract with Major League Soccer in order to take part in the 2013 MLS SuperDraft. A week later, Manneh was selected fourth overall by Vancouver Whitecaps FC. Vancouver made a trade with Toronto FC involving swapping picks and allocation money to get an earlier selection in order to draft Manneh.

Manneh scored two goals for the Whitecaps in a 3–2 preseason victory over the Charleston Battery in the 2013 Carolina Challenge Cup. On 3 March 2013 Manneh made his league debut for the Whitecaps, starting the match and playing 45 minutes of a 1–0 opening-day victory over Toronto FC.

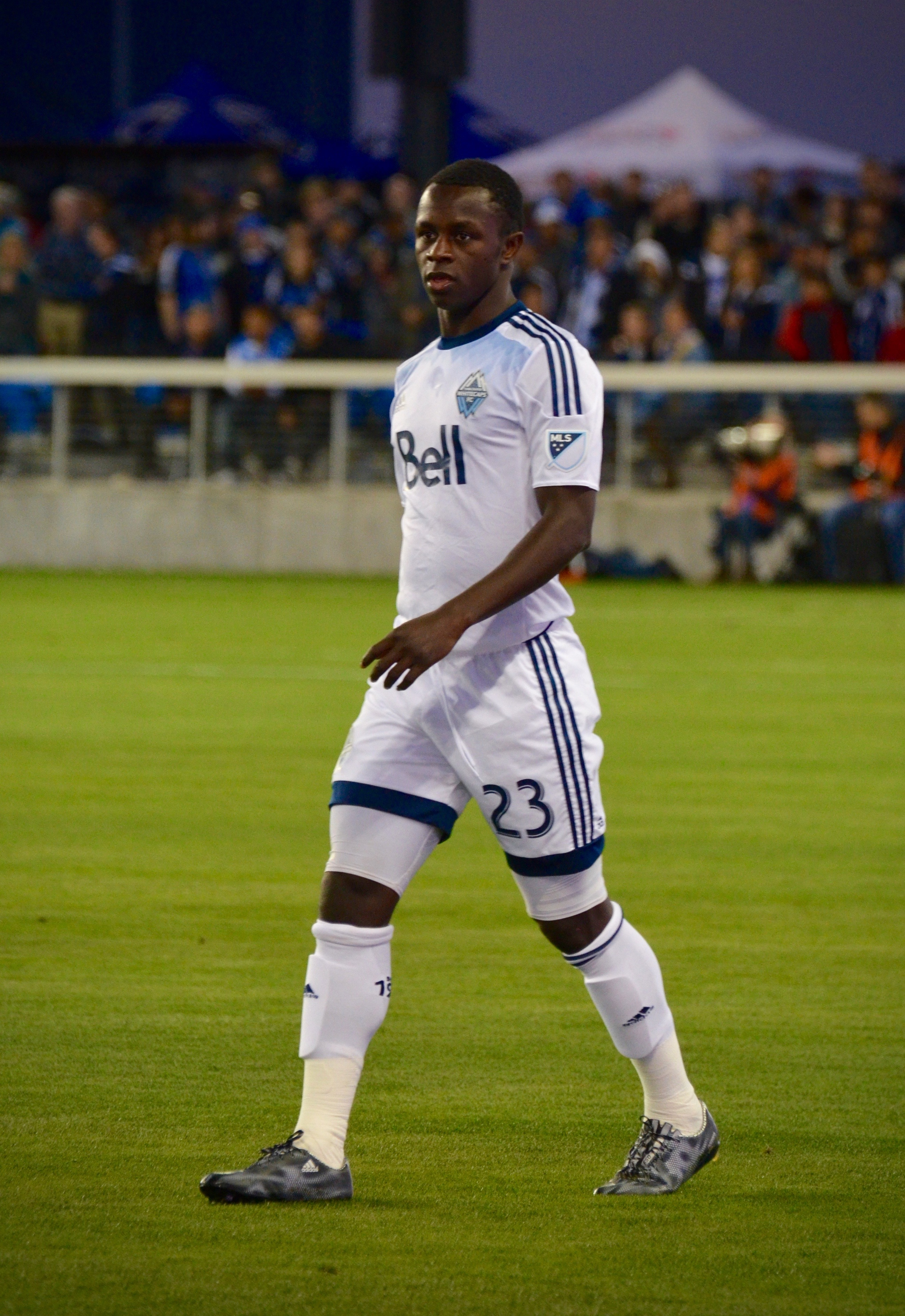
Manneh in 2015 against the San Jose Earthquakes.

Manneh scored his first professional goal on 27 April 2013, in a 2–2 draw with FC Dallas. After coming on as a 54th-minute substitute, he scored a 72nd-minute goal. Three minutes later, Manneh made a surging run past three defenders down the flank to set up Camilo's equalizer in the 75th minute. Manneh's goal and assist earned him man of the match honours. Manneh scored his first professional, and the Whitecaps' first MLS, hat-trick on 9 October 2013, in a 4–1 win over Seattle Sounders FC. At 18 years and 283 days, Manneh became the youngest player to have scored an MLS hat trick. On the following matchday, Manneh scored a curler from outside the penalty box against the Colorado Rapids.

Following a string of impressive performances in October 2013, it was reported that English Premier League powerhouses Chelsea, Arsenal, and Liverpool were in the hunt to sign the 18-year-old from Vancouver, with the latter apparently linked with a move for the player the previous summer.

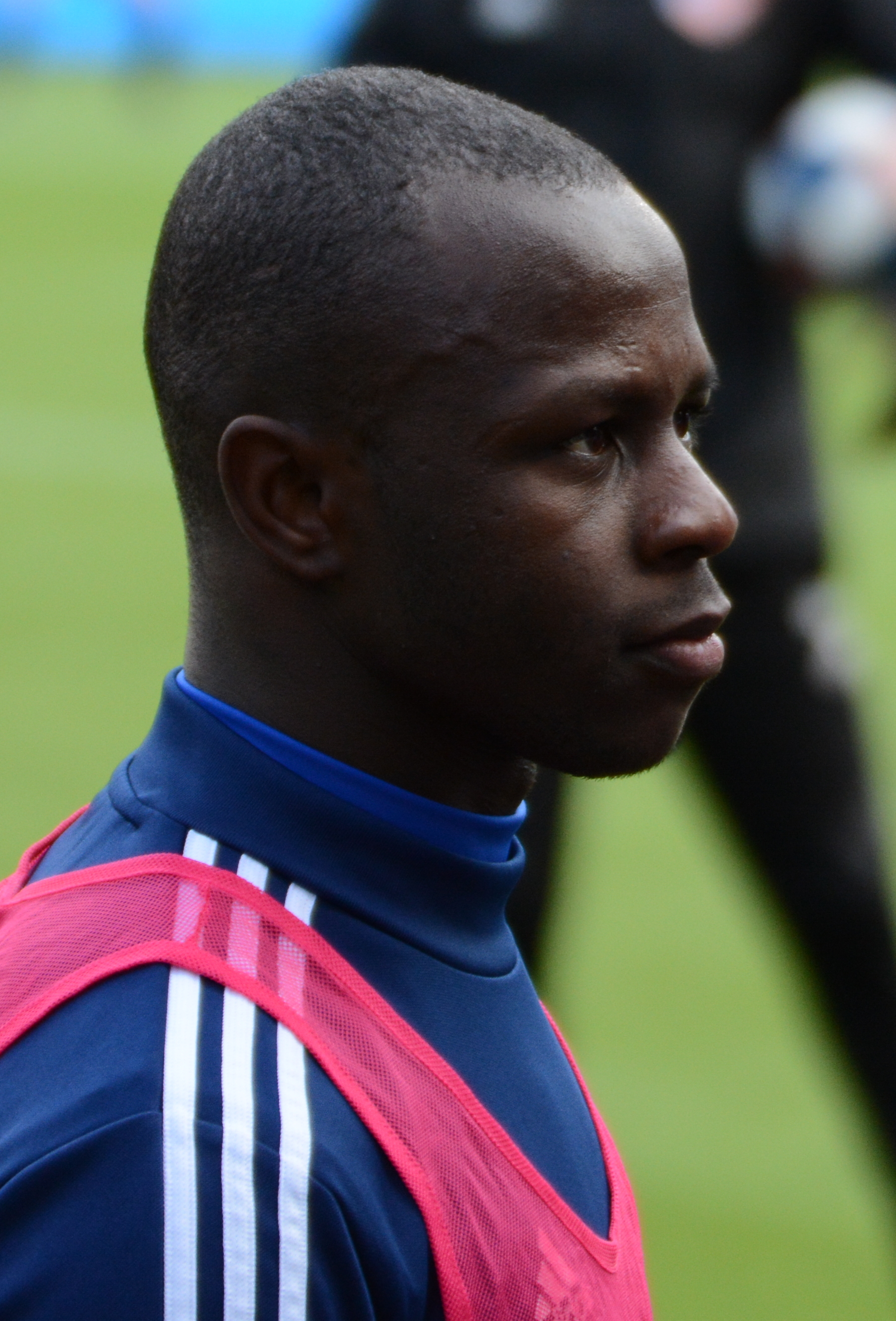
Manneh in 2019

In a deal announced 30 March 2017, Manneh was traded to Columbus Crew SC for Tony Tchani. The Whitecaps also received $300,000 in various allocation funds and a conditional first round draft pick. Manneh's contract expired at the end of the season, and although he was offered a new contract by Crew SC, he chose to head overseas and go on trial with Union Berlin.

On 26 December 2017, Manneh joined Mexican side Pachuca. However, the player made only one league appearance, playing only eight minutes, during his short tenure at the club.

Manneh transferred to Swiss Super League club FC St. Gallen in late June 2018.

On 13 February 2019, Manneh returned to the United States, joining FC Cincinnati ahead of their inaugural season in MLS. Cincinnati acquired his MLS rights from Columbus in exchange for $250,000 in Targeted Allocation Money and $50,000 in General Allocation Money. He scored his first goal for Cincinnati on March 24, 2019, against the New England Revolution.

On 17 August 2020, Manneh was traded to New England Revolution for an international roster slot. He scored his first goal for New England on October 14, 2020.

Manneh returned to the city of Austin on 22 January 2021, signing as a free agent with Austin FC ahead of their inaugural MLS season. Following the 2021 season, Manneh's contract option was declined by Austin.

On 7 February 2022, it was announced that Manneh had signed with USL Championship club San Antonio FC ahead of their upcoming 2022 season.

On 3 April 2023, Manneh signed with Canadian Premier League side Pacific FC for their 2023 season. He departed after one season.

== International career ==
Because of Manneh's performances with Steve Biko FC, he was called up for the Gambia's U20 national squad for the 2011 African Youth Championship in Tripoli, Libya in March of that year. Because of political unrest in Libya, the tournament was held in South Africa from 17–2 April May instead. In March 2014, Manneh was one of seven foreign-based players contacted by new Gambia Under-20 coach Tapha Manneh to be part of the squad for 2015 African U-20 Championship qualification, including the match against Liberia on 6 April. However, he was unable to accept the call up because of injury. Manneh has stated he wants to play for the United States after he receives his U.S. citizenship in September 2016. He was called up into the United States squad for the January 2017 camp as well as for a friendly against Paraguay in March 2018, but has not yet made an appearance for the team.

== Personal life ==
Manneh earned his U.S. citizenship in 2016. While playing for the Canada-based Vancouver Whitecaps FC, Manneh lived in the U.S. exclave of Point Roberts, Washington in order to fulfill his residency requirements for U.S. citizenship.

Manneh is Muslim and has observed the Islamic month of Ramadan to some extent.

== Career statistics ==
As of October 21, 2023

Club	Season	League			Playoffs (Note: Appearances in the PDL Playoffs and MLS Cup Playoffs)		Cup (Note: Includes the Canadian Championship, Copa MX, and Swiss Cup)		Continental (Note: All appearances in the CONCACAF Champions League)		Total	
Club	Season	Division	Apps	Goals	Apps	Goals	Apps	Goals	Apps	Goals	Apps	Goals
Austin Aztex	2012	PDL	12	10	2	3	–		–		14	13
Vancouver Whitecaps FC	2013	Major League Soccer	20	6	–		1	0	–		21	6
Vancouver Whitecaps FC	2014	Major League Soccer	29	4	0	0	2	1	–		31	5
Vancouver Whitecaps FC	2015	Major League Soccer	32	7	2	0	4	0	1	0	39	7
Vancouver Whitecaps FC	2016	Major League Soccer	17	5	–		4	0	0	0	21	5
Vancouver Whitecaps FC	2017	Major League Soccer	3	0	0	0	0	0	2	1	5	1
Vancouver Whitecaps FC	Total		101	22	2	0	11	1	3	1	117	24
Columbus Crew SC	2017	Major League Soccer	19	4	5	0	0	0	–		24	4
Pachuca	2017–18	Liga MX	1	0	–		5	0	–		6	0
St. Gallen	2018–19	Swiss Super League	7	0	–		2	0	0	0	9	0
FC Cincinnati	2019	Major League Soccer	27	4	–		–		–		27	4
FC Cincinnati	2020	Major League Soccer	2	1	–		–		–		2	1
FC Cincinnati	Total		29	5	0	0	0	0	0	0	29	5
New England Revolution	2020	Major League Soccer	6	1	–		–		–		6	1
Austin FC	2021	Major League Soccer	16	0	–		–		–		16	0
San Antonio FC	2022	USL Championship	0	0	–		–		–		0	0
Pacific FC	2023	Canadian Premier League	19	1	3	1	2	0	–		24	2
Career total			210	43	12	4	30	1	3	1	245	49

== Honors ==
- PDL Southern Conference All-Conference Team: 2012
- Canadian Championship: 2015
