= Cousens =

Cousens is a surname. Notable people with the surname include:

- Cecily Cousens (1918–2008), British diver
- Charles Cousens (1903–1964), Australian radio broadcaster, television presenter and army officer
- Don Cousens (1938–2017), Canadian politician
- Elizabeth M. Cousens, American diplomat
- Ellis Cousens (born 1952), American businessman
- Gabriel Cousens (born 1943), American physician, homeopath, and spiritual writer
- John Albert Cousens (1874–1937), American Universalist businessman and educator
- Lionel Cousens, Australian Paralympic archer
- Peter Cousens (born 1955), Australian actor
- Peter Cousens (born 1932), South African-born British cricketer
