= Cascio =

Cascio is a Sicilian surname, also attested in Calabria and the Naples area. According to the Italian onomastician Girolamo Caracausi, the surname derives from Italian cascio, an archaic form of cacio ("cheese"), ultimately from Latin caseus. The related surnames Lo Cascio and Locascio are referred by Caracausi to Cascio.

The Dictionary of American Family Names similarly derives the surname from cascio ("cheese") and suggests that it originated as a metonymic occupational name for a maker or seller of cheese.

Notable people with the surname include:

- Anna Theresa Cascio (born 1955), American writer
- Bubba Cascio (1932–2022), American racehorse trainer
- Jamais Cascio, American writer
- Jason Cascio (born 1985), American soccer player
- Pasquale Cascio (born 1957), Italian Roman Catholic archbishop
- Salvatore Cascio (born 1979), Italian actor
- Tony Cascio (born 1990), American soccer player
- Wayne Cascio, American economist

== See also ==
- Cascio tracks, several posthumous songs by Michael Jackson that are alleged to have been recorded by the Cascio family
- Locascio, including the variants LoCascio and Lo Cascio
