= Locascio =

Locascio, also written LoCascio or Lo Cascio, is a surname related to the Sicilian surname Cascio. The Italian onomastician Girolamo Caracausi records Lo Cascio as a Sicilian surname and Locascio in Palermo, referring both forms to Cascio.

Notable people with the surname include:

== Locascio and LoCascio ==
- A. J. LoCascio (born 1987), American actor
- Brian Locascio (born 1973), American advertising creative executive
- Frank LoCascio (1932–2021), American mobster
- John LoCascio (born 1991), American lacrosse player
- Laurie E. Locascio (born 1961), American biomedical engineer
- Peter LoCascio (1916–1997), American mobster
- Robert LoCascio (born 1968), American businessman
- Sal LoCascio (born 1967), American lacrosse player
- Salvatore LoCascio (born 1958), American mobster

== Lo Cascio ==
- Elio Lo Cascio (born 1948), Italian historian
- Luigi Lo Cascio (born 1967), Italian actor, film director and writer

== See also ==
- Cascio, the related Sicilian surname
