= Camilo Sanvezzo =

Brazilian footballer (born 1988)

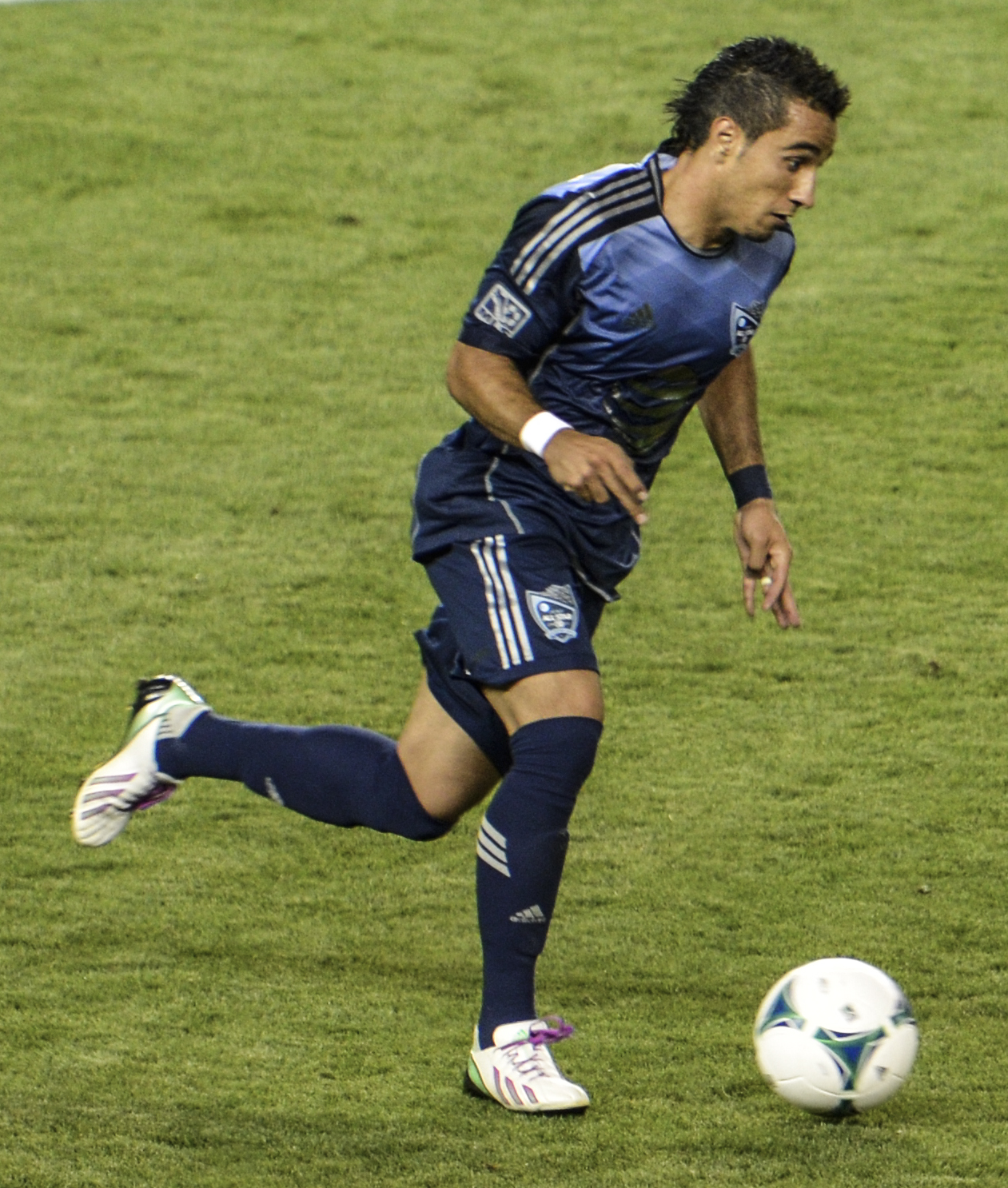
- Sanvezzo at the 2013 MLS All-Star Game

Personal information
- Full name: Camilo da Silva Sanvezzo
- Date of birth: 21 July 1988 (age 38)
- Place of birth: Presidente Prudente, Brazil
- Height: 1.70 m (5 ft 7 in)
- Position: Forward

Senior career*
Years	Team	Apps	(Gls)
2009	Corinthians-AL	8	(1)
2009–2010	Qormi	22	(24)
2010–2011	Gyeongnam	7	(0)
2011–2013	Vancouver Whitecaps FC	92	(39)
2014–2019	Querétaro	118	(53)
2019–2020	Tijuana	20	(6)
2020–2021	Mazatlán	40	(21)
2022–2023	Toluca	55	(14)
2023	Querétaro	13	(2)
Total		375	(160)
- * Club domestic league appearances and goals

Camilo da Silva Sanvezzo (born 21 July 1988) is a Brazilian former professional footballer who played as a forward. He is a Mexican naturalized citizen.

== Club career ==
=== Corinthians Alagoano ===
Camilo began his career in the youth ranks of Oeste Paulista Esporte Clube. In 2009, he moved to Corinthians Alagoano and remained there one year before taking his career to Europe.

=== Qormi FC ===
Camilo had a successful start with Qormi, scoring the winning goal on his debut against Sliema Wanderers, a hat-trick against Msida St. Joseph, and another hat-trick against reigning champions Hibernians.

Come midseason Qormi received an offer from a South Korean club for the striker, although they rejected the offer, explaining the bid was too small and Camilo's important role at the club.

Camilo played a vital role in Qormi's successful season, scoring 24 goals in 22 league matches – an average of more than one goal per game.

=== Gyeongnam FC ===
On 7 July 2010, Camilo moved to K-League side Gyeongnam. Camilo struggled to capture the form that made him a prolific scorer in Malta. With Gyeongnam he appeared in seven games without scoring a goal. However, he did score six goals in seven appearances for the club's 'B' team.

=== Vancouver Whitecaps FC ===
Camilo trialed with Vancouver Whitecaps FC of Major League Soccer prior to the 2011 season. His trial was successful and the club signed him on 17 March 2011. He made his debut for the Whitecaps as a late substitute in their opening game of the 2011 season against Toronto FC. He scored his first two goals for the Whitecaps on 2 April 2011 against Sporting Kansas City, contributing the team's second and third goals in a 3–3 comeback draw; this also made him the first player in MLS history to score two goals in stoppage time. Camilo was named as the Whitecaps FC Player of the Year for his contributions to the team during the 2011 season, including a team-high 12 goals and consistency on the field.

Camilo signed a contract extension with Vancouver on 1 February 2012. However, Camilo did not have a great start to the year. He did not regain his consistent form until the final games of the season. Camilo scored a goal and added 3 assists in a 4–0 win against Chivas USA. In total, Camilo tallied five goals and 7 assists in 28 matches during the 2012 Major League Soccer season, compared to 12 goals and 3 assists the prior season.

Camilo rebounded from a mediocre 2012 season to be considered a potential league MVP candidate in 2013. During the season, Camilo tallied 6 assists. Additionally, Camilo closed the 2013 season with a hat-trick at home against Colorado Rapids to win the MLS scoring race with 22 goals.

Following his impressive season, Camilo was the subject of interest from Rosenborg, Norway's most decorated club. However, at that time, Whitecaps president Bob Lenarduzzi indicated that Camilo was under contract and that the club was looking forward to having him back for the 2014 season. In January 2014, Camilo was once again the subject of transfer rumors after reportedly being linked to Querétaro of Mexico's Liga MX, with some media outlets even reporting that the deal was already completed. However, Whitecaps management quickly stated that there was no truth to the rumors, and details were subsequently removed from Querétaro' website. However, despite the denial a deal had been reached, Camilo continued to train with Querétaro. Whitecaps officials labelled Camilo's behaviour as "unacceptable and inappropriate" and "unprofessional". Fan reaction was split, with anger directed both at Camilo and the Whitecaps front office for how the situation was handled.

=== Querétaro ===
On 17 January 2014, the transfer saga came to an end as Vancouver received a then club record $2.1 million transfer fee. In the Apertura 2014, Camilo was the top goal scorer of the tournament with 12 goals (tied with Mauro Boselli). Just weeks after his return from a knee injury that kept him out of the Clausura 2015, Sanvezzo sustained another injury and missed the rest of the Apertura 2015 and a major part of the 2016 Clausura. On 15 April 2016, after more than seven months injured, Camilo returned in a home match where Querétaro defeated Club América 1–0.Camilo's nickname became "El Lobo" in 2016. On 28 April 2019, Camilo scored his final goal as well as providing an assist to then teammate Ayron del Valle in 2–1 home win against Veracruz. The following week on 4 May 2019, he played his final game against Necaxa playing the full 90 minutes, the match ended in a 1–0 loss.

As of 28 April 2019, he is the club's all-time top scorer with 67 goals.

== International career ==
Camilo has not represented Brazil, his country of birth, at any level. In July 2013, it was revealed that Camilo was considering representing Canada internationally. Camilo applied for permanent residency but had to wait to gain full citizenship before he could appear for the Canada national team, a process that Ghana-born former Whitecaps teammate Gershon Koffie was already undertaking. About the prospect, Camilo stated, "Vancouver is a good city, Canada is a beautiful country and if I get the opportunity I will decide with my family."

== Career statistics ==
As of 30 October 2020

Appearances and goals by club, season and competition
Club	Season	League			National Cup		League Cup		Other		Total	
Club	Season	Division	Apps	Goals	Apps	Goals	Apps	Goals	Apps	Goals	Apps	Goals
Qormi	2009–10	Maltese Premier League	22	24	0	0	0	0	0	0	22	24
Gyeongnam FC	2010	K-League	6	0	0	0	2	0	1 (Note: Appearances in K League Championship)	0	9	0
Vancouver Whitecaps	2011	Major League Soccer	32	12	4	1	—				36	13
Vancouver Whitecaps	2012	Major League Soccer	28	5	3	0	—				31	5
Vancouver Whitecaps	2013	Major League Soccer	32	22	3	3	—				35	25
Vancouver Whitecaps	Total		92	39	10	4	0	0	0	0	102	43
Querétaro	2013–14	Liga MX	8	3	2	0	—				10	3
Querétaro	2014–15	Liga MX	17	12	2	1	—				19	13
Querétaro	2015–16	Liga MX	3	1	0	0	—		1 (Note: Appearances in CONCACAF Champions League)	0	4	1
Querétaro	2016–17	Liga MX	29	13	11	7	—				40	20
Querétaro	2017–18	Liga MX	28	11	9	3	—				37	14
Querétaro	2018–19	Liga MX	33	13	5	3	—				38	16
Querétaro	Total		118	53	29	14	0	0	0	0	147	67
Tijuana	2019–20	Liga MX	20	6	3	4	—				23	10
Mazatlán F.C.	2020–21	Liga MX	40	21	0	0	—				40	21
Career totals			268	130	42	22	2	0	2	0	314	152

== Honours ==
Querétaro

- Copa MX: Apertura 2016
- Supercopa MX: 2017

Individual

- Maltese Premier League top goalscorer: 2009–10
- Vancouver Whitecaps FC Player of the Year: 2011, 2013
- Canadian Championship Golden Boot: 2013
- MLS All-Star: 2013
- MLS Golden Boot: 2013
- MLS Goal of the Year Award: 2013
- Liga MX Golden Boot: Apertura 2014 (shared with Mauro Boselli)
