= Hundal =

Hundal is a surname. Notable people with the surname include:

- Avantika Hundal, Indian actress
- Shaan Hundal (born 1999), Canadian soccer player
- Simranjit Singh Hundal, Indian film director and writer
- Sunny Hundal (born 1977), British journalist, blogger and academic
- Tej Hundal (born 1974), singer-songwriter

== See also ==
- Hindal, a Sikh religious leader
