= Peter Cousens (cricketer) =

South African-born English cricketer (1932–2026)

Personal information
- Full name: Peter Cousens
- Born: 15 May 1932; Durban, Natal Province, South Africa
- Died: 20 January 2026 (aged 93)
- Batting: Right-handed
- Bowling: Slow left-arm orthodox

Domestic team information
- Years: Team
- 1950–1955: Essex

Career statistics
| Competition | First-class |
|---|---|
| Matches | 39 |
| Runs scored | 72 |
| Batting average | 3.00 |
| 100s/50s | –/– |
| Top score | 13 |
| Balls bowled | 3,950 |
| Wickets | 44 |
| Bowling average | 38.79 |
| 5 wickets in innings | – |
| 10 wickets in match | – |
| Best bowling | 4/63 |
| Catches/stumpings | 4/– |
- Source: Cricinfo, 10 October 2011

Peter Cousens (15 May 1932 – 20 January 2026) was a South African-born English cricketer. He was a right-handed batsman who bowled slow left-arm orthodox.

== Biography ==
Cousens was born in Durban, Natal on 15 May 1932. He made his first-class debut for Essex against Lancashire in the 1950 County Championship. He made 38 further first-class appearances for Essex, the last of which came against Sussex in the 1955 County Championship. In his 39 first-class appearances for Essex, he took 44 wickets at a bowling average of 38.79, with best figures of 4/63. A poor batsman, Cousens scored just 72 runs at a batting average of 3.00, with a high score of 13. An infrequent feature in the Essex side of the early 1950s, Cousens left the county at the end of the 1955 season.

Cousens died on 20 January 2026, at the age of 93.
