= Plavšić =

Plavšić or Plavsic is a Serbian surname. Notable people with the surname include:

- Biljana Plavšić (1930–2026), Bosnian Serb politician
- Adrien Plavsic (born 1970), Canadian hockey player
- Branko Plavšić (1949–2011), Serbian comic book artist
- Nikolina Plavšić (born 2001), Serbian footballer
- Srđan Plavšić (born 1996), Serbian football player
