= Tej Hundal =

- Born: Tej Hundal; 29 March 1974 (age 51)
- Genres: Bhangra, Indi-pop
- Occupation: Singer-songwriter
- Years active: 2012–present
- Labels: MovieBox, United Kingdom; Music Waves, Canada; Goyal Music, India
- Website: www.tejhundal.com

Tej Singh Hundal (born 29 March 1974) is an Indian singer-songwriter. He released his debut album, Punjabiaan Da Raaj, on 9 August 2012. The album was composed & produced by Ravi Bal. The album was released on MovieBox in the United Kingdom, Music Waves in Canada & Goyal Music in India.

== Discography ==
Release	Album	Record label	Music
2012	Punjabian Da Raaj	MovieBox/Music Waves/Goyal Music	Ravi Bal
