= Niall Cousens =

Canadian soccer player

Personal information
- Date of birth: 25 February 1991
- Place of birth: Canada
- Position(s): Forward

Senior career*
Years	Team	Apps	(Gls)
2009-2010/11	SK Slavia Prague	0	(0)
2010/2011	FC Hlučín→(loan)	7	(1)
2013	Vancouver Whitecaps FC	0	(0)
- *Club domestic league appearances and goals

Niall Cousens (born 25 February 1991 in Canada) is a Canadian retired soccer player.

== Career ==
In 2009, Cousens signed for SK Slavia Prague, one of the most successful teams in the Czech Republic, after scoring two goals in a friendly while on trial.

For 2010-11, he was loaned to Hlučín in the Czech second division.

After an invitation to play in Germany never happened, Cousens joined Vancouver Whitecaps before enrolling in the University of British Columbia in 2013, where he played for their soccer team.
