= Ellis Cousens =

Ellis E. Cousens (born 1952) Born in the Bronx, NY, Cousens graduated from De Witt Clinton H.S. in 1970 where he is recognized as a distinguished alumni. After graduating Hunter College with a B.A. in Geology in 1974, he went on to receive an M.S. degree in Geology from Rensselaer Polytechnic Institute in Troy, NY. He then relocated to Southern California where he worked as a professional Geotechnical Engineer with the consulting firm of Leighton & Associates in Irvine, CA. Eventually returning to New York, he received an M.B.A. in Finance from Iona College, now Iona University. He retired in 2014 as Executive Vice President, Chief Financial Officer and Chief Operations Officer of John Wiley & Sons, Inc., having worked there since March 2001. Previously Senior Vice President, Chief Financial Officer of Bookspan, a Bertelsmann AG and Time Warner Inc. joint venture, from March 2000; Vice President, Finance and Strategic Planning, of Bertelsmann AG from March 1999; Vice President, Chief Financial Officer of BOL.com, a subsidiary of Bertelsmann AG, from August 1998.

Cousens was a Trustee on the Board of Education in Yonkers, NY from 1993-2000 and served as its Vice President 1995-1996 and President from 1996-1998.

== Education ==
Cousens graduated from DeWitt Clinton High School, Bronx, NY class of 1970. He earned a bachelor's degree from Hunter College, Master of Science from Rensselaer Polytechnic Institute and an MBA in Finance from the Hagan School of Business of Iona College.
