= Greg Klazura =

American soccer player

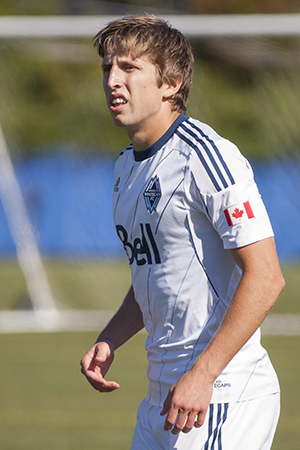

Personal information
- Full name: Gregory Judith Klazura
- Date of birth: January 27, 1989 (age 37)
- Place of birth: Rockford, Illinois, U.S.
- Height: 5 ft 10 in (1.78 m)
- Position: Defender

College career
| Years | Team | Apps | (Gls) |
| 2007–2011 | Notre Dame Fighting Irish | | |

Senior career*
| Years | Team | Apps | (Gls) |
| 2010–2011 | Indiana Invaders | 13 | (0) |
| 2012–2013 | Vancouver Whitecaps FC | 2 | (0) |
| 2012 | → Vancouver Whitecaps FC U-23 (loan) | 1 | (0) |
| 2014 | Bantu Tshintsha Guluva Rovers | | |
| Total | | 16+ | (0+) |
- * Club domestic league appearances and goals as of November 25, 2013

Gregory Klazura (born January 27, 1989) is an American former soccer player who most recently played for the Vancouver Whitecaps FC in Major League Soccer.

== Career ==
=== College & amateur ===
Klazura played soccer in the NCAA for the Notre Dame Fighting Irish. He spent five years with the Fighting Irish where he appeared in 38 matches. In his fifth year he was named co-captain.

Klazura also spent two seasons with the Indiana Invaders of the USL Premier Development League.

=== Professional ===
On January 17, 2012, Klazura was drafted by Vancouver Whitecaps FC in the second-round of the 2012 MLS Supplemental Draft. After impressing the coaching staff during the preseason he was signed by the Whitecaps on February 22, 2012. On May 2, Klazura made his debut in a 2–0 win over FC Edmonton in the Canadian Championship.

Following the 2013 MLS season, Klazura and the Whitecaps did not come to terms on a new contract. That year, Klazura traveled to Zimbabwe to play professional soccer for Bantu Tshintsha Guluva Rovers. He also worked for the GrassRootSoccer Organization to educate children on the risks of HIV and AIDS. Klazura began medical school at the University of Illinois at Chicago College of Medicine in August 2014. In 2018 he graduated from medical school and began post-graduate training in general surgery at Loyola University Medical Center.

During a research sabbatical from 2020 to 2022 as the Global Surgery Fellow at UIC and Health Equity Fellow at UCSF he earned his Master of Public Health at the University of Illinois at Chicago School of Public Health and completed a Fulbright Fogarty Fellowship in Public Health.
