= Wayne Cascio =

American economist

Wayne F. Cascio is an American economist, currently a distinguished professor and the Robert H. Reynolds Chair in Global Leadership at University of Colorado Denver Business School and previously the president of the Society for Industrial and Organizational Psychology in 1992 to 1993. In 2004, he was the G. T. Kok Distinguished Professor of Management at Nanyang Business School, Nanyang Technological University, Singapore.

Cascio holds a PhD in industrial/organizational psychology from the University of Rochester.
