= Gagan Dosanjh =

Canadian soccer player (born 1990)

Personal information
- Full name: Gagandeep Dosanjh
- Date of birth: 1 November 1990 (age 36)
- Place of birth: Abbotsford, British Columbia, Canada
- Height: 1.68 m (5 ft 6 in)
- Position: Midfielder

Youth career
- Abbotsford Soccer Association
- 2010–2012: UBC Thunderbirds

Senior career*
Years	Team	Apps	(Gls)
2007	Abbotsford Rangers	13	(2)
2008–2010	Vancouver Whitecaps FC U-23	38	(6)
2009–2010	→ Energie Cottbus II (loan)	6	(0)
2012	Vancouver Whitecaps FC U-23	15	(2)
2013	FC Edmonton	5	(0)

International career^{‡}
2007	Canada U17	2	(0)
- * Club domestic league appearances and goals as of 18 November 2013 ‡ National team caps and goals as of 18 November 2013

Gagandeep Dosanjh (born 1 November 1990) is a Canadian professional soccer player who plays as a midfielder.

== Club career ==
=== Youth ===
Born in Abbotsford, British Columbia to Pavinder and Gurpal Dosanjh, both Indian immigrants from Punjab. Dosanjh started his career in the USL PDL with the Abbotsford Rangers in 2007. He then joined the Whitecaps U-23 where he stayed until 2010. While with the Whitecaps U-23, Dosanjh went on loan to Energie Cottbus U23 side in the Oberliga.

Then, in 2010, Dosanjh joined the University of British Columbia where he played for the UBC Thunderbirds of the Canadian Interuniversity Sport leagues. In his first year with the side he helped lead the team to the Canada West title. Individually he earned a Canada West first team all-star selection and CIS Championship tournament all-star selection. In 2012 Dosanjh lead the Thunderbirds to 2012 CIS Championship where he scored four goals in three games. He also earned the UBC Thunderbirds Bus Phillips Memorial Trophy winner in 2013 as the UBC Male Athlete of the Year as well as CIS Championship tournament all-star selection and he also won the CIS Championship MVP award. Overall during his three seasons with the team, Dosanjh scored 26 goals in 50 games.

Also in 2012, during the summer, Dosanjh re-joined the Whitecaps organization as captain of the Vancouver Whitecaps FC U-23 side during the 2012 PDL season. He scored four goals in fifteen matches in his only season with the team.

For the 2015–16 season, Gagan has returned to UBC Thunderbirds program. Dosanjh scored seven times during the regular season, which him seventh on the Canada West leaderboard. He also third in the league with five assists. This earned him second-team CIS honours in his final season. He was also named a Canada-West All-Star.

=== FC Edmonton ===
On 1 August 2013, it was confirmed that Dosanjh had signed with FC Edmonton of the North American Soccer League. He made his professional debut for the team on 24 August 2013 against the Tampa Bay Rowdies at Al Lang Stadium in which he came on in the 58th minute for Robert Garrett as Edmonton drew 1–1.

== International career ==
In 2007 Dosanjh made his debut for the Canada U17 team.

== Career statistics ==
As of 18 November 2013

Appearances and goals by club, season and competition
Club	Season	League			Canadian cup		Other		CONCACAF		Total	
Club	Season	Division	Apps	Goals	Apps	Goals	Apps	Goals	Apps	Goals	Apps	Goals
Vancouver Whitecaps FC U-23	2012	USL PDL	15	4	–		–		–		15	4
FC Edmonton	2013	NASL	5	0	0	0	–		–		5	0
Career total			20	4	0	0	0	0	0	0	20	4
