= Gershon Koffie =

Ghanaian footballer

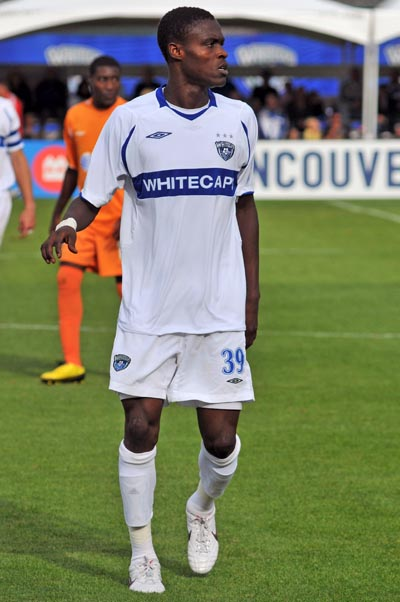
- Koffie playing for Vancouver Whitecaps FC in 2010

Personal information
- Date of birth: 25 August 1991 (age 35)
- Place of birth: Koforidua, Ghana
- Height: 1.82 m (6 ft 0 in)
- Position: Midfielder

Team information
- Current team: Maccabi Herzliya
- Number: 28

Youth career
- 2000–2006: Rot-Weiss Accra

Senior career*
| Years | Team | Apps | (Gls) |
| 2006–2009 | International Allies | | |
| 2010 | Vancouver Whitecaps | 2 | (0) |
| 2011–2015 | Vancouver Whitecaps FC | 133 | (9) |
| 2016 | New England Revolution | 22 | (0) |
| 2017–2018 | Hammarby IF | 2 | (0) |
| 2017 | → New England Revolution (loan) | 23 | (0) |
| 2018–2019 | Al-Fahaheel | 18 | (1) |
| 2019–2020 | Hapoel Kfar Saba | 29 | (1) |
| 2021–2022 | Indy Eleven | 26 | (0) |
| 2022 | Sandecja Nowy Sącz | 9 | (0) |
| 2022–2023 | Ironi Tiberias | 42 | (0) |
| 2024– | Maccabi Herzliya | 8 | (0) |

International career
| 2011 | Ghana U20 | 2 | (0) |
- * Club domestic league appearances and goals as of 25 August 2024

Gershon Koffie (born 25 August 1991) is a Ghanaian professional footballer who plays as a midfielder for Israeli club Maccabi Herzliya.

== Club career ==
=== Youth career ===
Koffie grew up in the Ghanaian capital Accra, and began his soccer career when he joined Rot-Weiss Accra - a development club affiliated with German club Rot-Weiss Essen - as a nine-year-old in 2000. He spent five years with Rot-Weiss Accra, before signing his first professional contract in 2006 with Ghanaian Division Two League team International Allies at the age of 15.

=== Senior career ===
Koffie played four full seasons with International Allies, scoring 28 goals in all competitions, before leaving the club in 2009 to try to secure a spot with a professional team in Europe. The Swedish side Hammarby IF was at a scouting trip in Ghana when Koffie broke his leg. Hammarby helped him with the operation and the rehabilitation in Sweden. Later on he trained with the Danish club Randers, but was not offered a contract.

Having been spotted by Vancouver's director of soccer operations Tom Soehn at a tournament in Ghana six months previously, Koffie relocated to Canada in 2010, and subsequently signed with the Vancouver Whitecaps of the USSF Division 2 Professional League. He made his Whitecaps debut on 5 September 2010, in a 0–0 tie with the Puerto Rico Islanders. On 9 February 2011, he signed a new contract for the 2011 Major League Soccer season with Vancouver Whitecaps FC. He scored his first goal for the club on 7 August 2011, in a 4–2 win over Chicago Fire.

He would later establish himself as a key player for Whitecaps FC, making a total of 133 appearances, and scoring on 9 occasions. Before the 2016 MLS season Koffie was traded to New England Revolution. The deal was confirmed on 11 February 2016, with Whitecaps FC getting general allocation money and targeted allocation money in exchange for the player. Vancouver were also to receive a percentage of any future transfer fee obtained by New England.

Koffie would later move on to make 22 competitive league games for New England during the season. His stint at the club was plagued by injuries, but Koffie performed like a club MVP when healthy, covering acres of space in the middle of the park while constantly bullying attackers.

On 15 January 2017, he moved to Europe for the first time in his career, signing a three-year deal with Hammarby IF in the Swedish Allsvenskan, the club he had rehabilitated with in 2009.

He made his first and ultimately only appearance in Allsvenskan on 9 April, in a 1–1 home draw against Kalmar FF. After failing to impress manager Jakob Michelsen, Koffie was deemed surplus to requirements and got sent on a one year-loan to his former club New England Revolution in May 2017. After playing 23 games with New England during the season, he returned to Hammarby before the start of the 2018 season. He made one appearance during the first half of the season, before leaving on a free transfer on 1 June 2018. Koffie and Hammarby cancelled the contract by mutual consent.

On 10 June 2022, he signed with Israeli Liga Leumit club Ironi Tiberias.

== International career ==
Koffie was called up to the Ghana under-20 national team national team for the first time in July 2010. He was named in Ghana's team for the 2011 African Youth Championship, starting against Gambia on 21 April 2011. He was substituted after an hour for James Bissue. He made a substitute appearance against Cameroon on 24 April 2011, replacing Paul Aidoo in the 67th minute. Ghana were eliminated from the competition at the group stage finishing in third position behind Cameroon and Nigeria.

== Personal life ==
Koffie received his Canadian Permanent Residency in 2013, which qualifies him as a domestic player on Canadian clubs for MLS roster purposes. Koffie was married to Souadou Drame former Model and Miss Guinee North America 2013.

== Honours ==
Vancouver Whitecaps FC

- Canadian Championship: 2015
