= 2012 Vancouver Whitecaps FC season =

Vancouver Whitecaps FC 2012 soccer season

Vancouver Whitecaps FC
2012 season
- Chairman: Greg Kerfoot
- Head coach: Martin Rennie
- Stadium: BC Place
- Major League Soccer: 5th, West; 12th, Overall
- MLS Cup Playoffs: Knockout round
- Canadian Championship: Runners-up
- Cascadia Cup: 3rd
- Pro Soccer Classic: Winners
- Top goalscorer: League: Darren Mattocks (7); All: Darren Mattocks (8)
- Highest home attendance: 21,000 (sell-out) vs. Montreal Impact (March 10) vs. Seattle Sounders FC (May 19) vs. Los Angeles Galaxy (July 18) vs. Seattle Sounders FC (September 29) vs. Portland Timbers (October 21)
- Lowest home attendance: 14,878 vs. Toronto FC (May 16)
- Average home league attendance: League: 19,475; All: 18,998
Home colours	Away colours	Third colours

The 2012 Vancouver Whitecaps FC season was the Whitecaps' second season in Major League Soccer, the top tier of soccer in the United States and Canada. In 2011, the expansion Whitecaps FC struggled to find the results and finished at the bottom of the league table winning just six matches with none on the road. By finishing last overall in the regular season the Whitecaps FC received the 2nd overall pick in the 2012 MLS SuperDraft and 2012 MLS Supplemental Draft that were held in January 2012.

The Whitecaps second season began on March 10 against expansion side, and Canadian rivals, Montreal Impact at BC Place with a 2–0 victory. Vancouver set a MLS record by going 427 minutes without conceding a goal to start the season. The club qualified for the playoffs for the first time on October 23 when Seattle Sounders FC defeated FC Dallas. They became the first Canadian MLS team to make the playoffs in MLS history.

Vancouver finished as runners-up in the 2012 Canadian Championship after losing to Toronto FC in the Final for the second consecutive season, under the current bracket format. The Whitecaps defeated FC Edmonton with an aggregate score of 5–1 in the semi-finals before falling 2–1 on aggregate to Toronto.

== Season overview ==
=== January/February ===
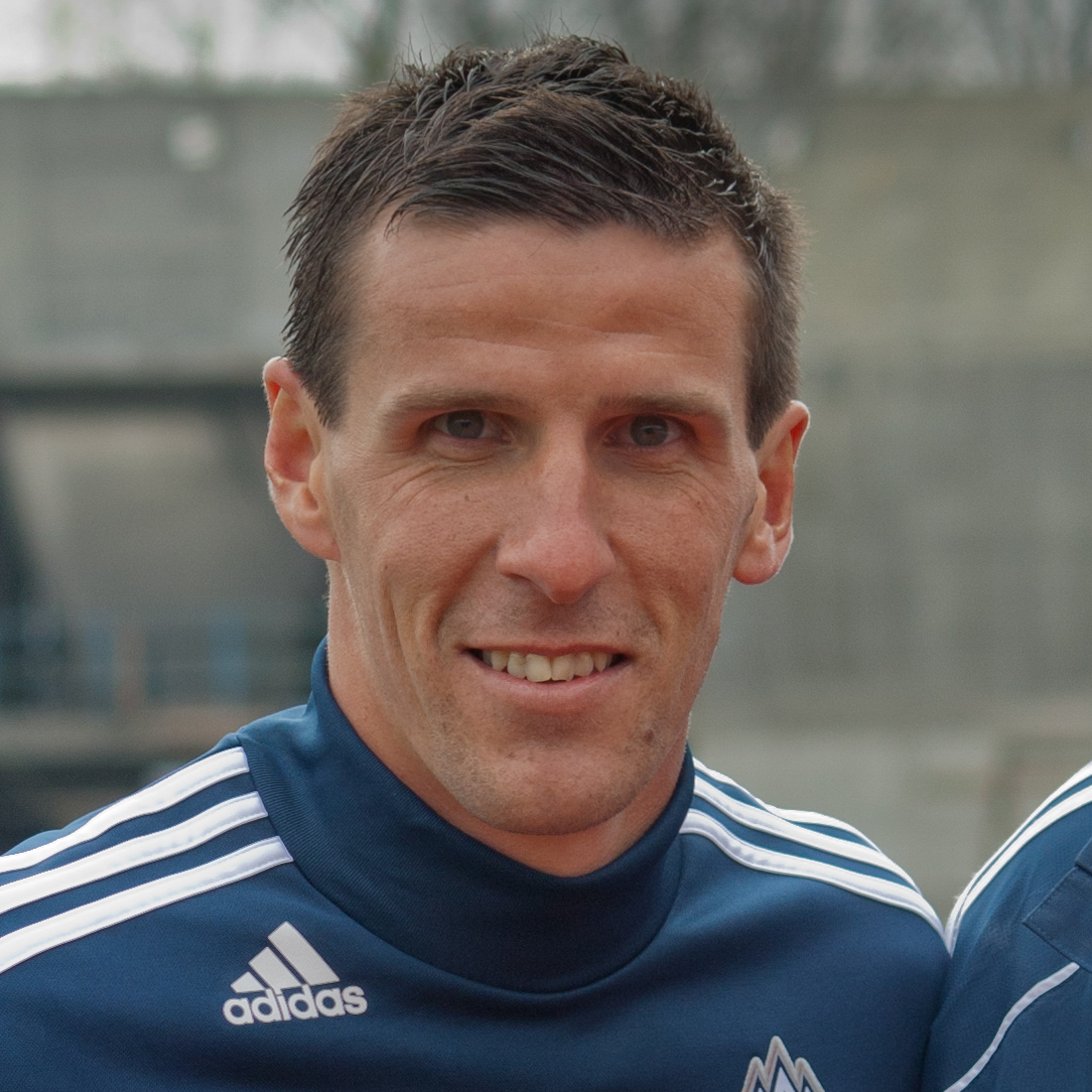
Le Toux was acquired on January 31 from Philadelphia. He scored the first goal of the season for Vancouver. He was traded to New York on July 13.

By finishing last overall in the league table in 2011, the Vancouver Whitecaps received the 2nd overall draft choice in the 2012 MLS SuperDraft and Supplemental Draft. The SuperDraft was held on January 12 and the club selected Darren Mattocks with their first-round pick and Chris Estridge with their second-round pick. As a Generation Adidas player, Mattocks was already signed to a league contract prior to being drafted. The Whitecaps also selected four players in the Supplemental Draft, Gienir Garcia, Greg Klazura, Andrew Fontein and Mark Fetrow. Garcia was traded shortly after to Montreal in exchange for the discovery rights to Etienne Barbara.

Training camp for the 2012 MLS season began in Vancouver on January 23. Under new head coach, Martin Rennie, the Vancouver Whitecaps FC underwent a large number of personnel changes both on the pitch and off. Rennie replaced assistant coaches Colin Miller and Denis Hamlett with Paul Ritchie, Carl Robinson and Jake DeClute. He also acquired several high-profile players to add to the club. After signing Lee Young-Pyo and Lee Nguyen in December, the club acquired MLS All-star striker Sébastien Le Toux from the Philadelphia Union on January 31 in exchange for allocation money. On February 16 the Whitecaps also announced the signing of Middlesbrough F.C. midfielder, and Scottish international, Barry Robson as their newest designated player, replacing Mustapha Jarju who was released shortly before. Robson will join the club in July after his season with Middlesbrough has concluded.

The Whitecaps spent ten days training at the Grande Sports World complex in Casa Grande, Arizona for the second consecutive season. During the training camp, the club played in two friendlies against Seattle Sounders FC and Real Salt Lake. Both matches ended in 1–1 draws, with Camilo and Darren Mattocks scoring the goals for Vancouver. The Whitecaps returned to Vancouver for training and played a friendly against Victoria of the CIS; the Whitecaps won the match 2–1.

On February 21, the Whitecaps began training at the ESPN Wide World of Sports Complex in Orlando, Florida. The Whitecaps signed their second-round Supplemental Draft choice, Greg Klazura, on February 22. During their two-week training camp in Florida they competed in the Walt Disney World Pro Soccer Classic. Vancouver played three group stage matches against Montreal Impact, Houston Dynamo, and Sporting Kansas City. They finished the group stage with three wins while scoring seven goals, led by Le Toux with three, and conceding none.

=== March ===
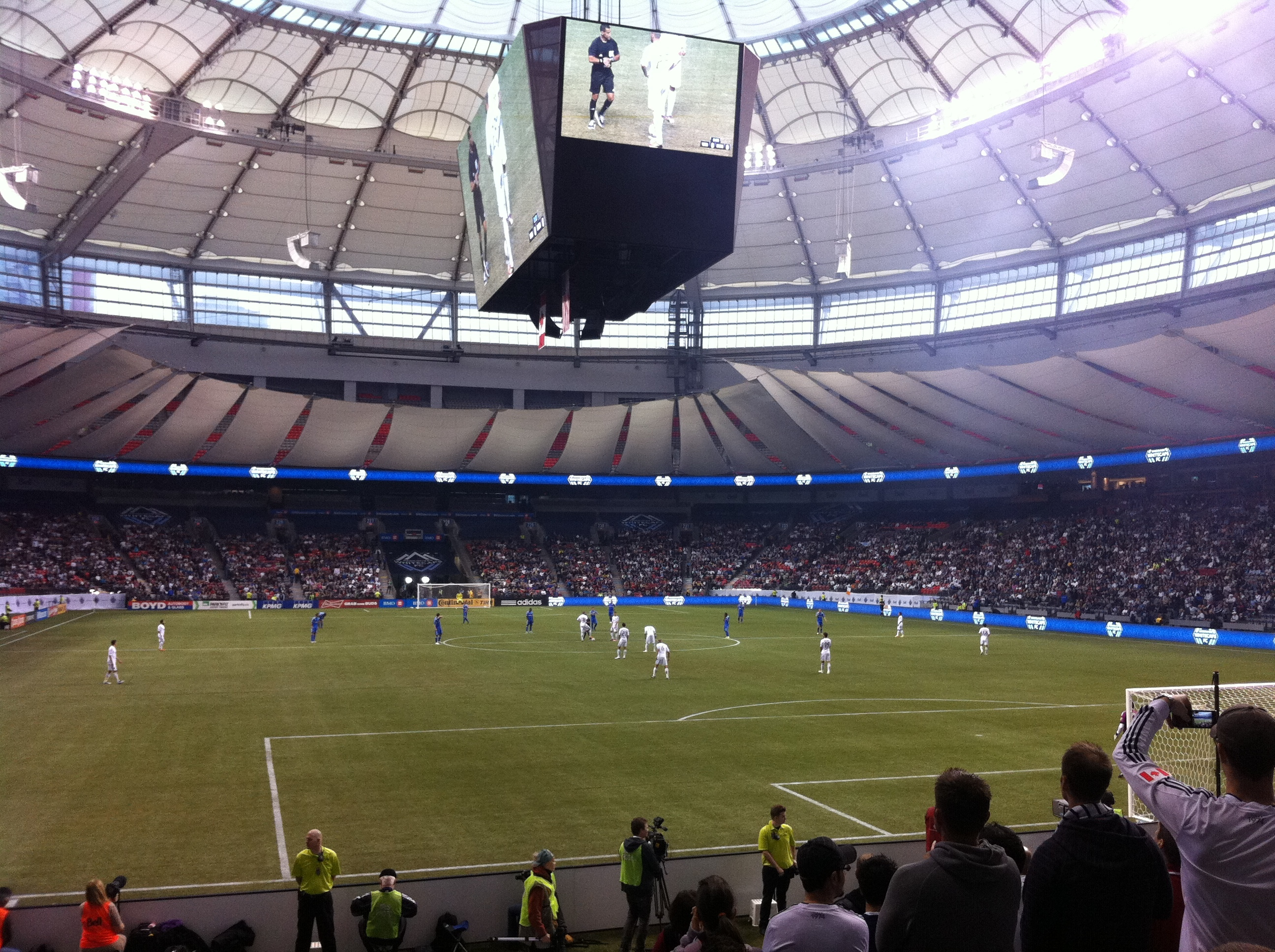
Vancouver Whitecaps FC second MLS season opener against the Montreal Impact on March 10 at BC Place.

The Vancouver Whitecaps won their first trophy as an MLS franchise when they defeated Toronto FC by a score of 1–0 in the Walt Disney Pro Soccer Classic Final on March 3. Camilo scored the lone goal of the match for Vancouver in the 10th minute. The club then played their final match of the preseason, a community shield friendly, against Martin Rennie's former club, Carolina RailHawks FC, the following day. The match also featured former RailHawks FC players Brad Knighton and Matt Watson. The Whitecaps tied the match at 2 with a last-minute goal by Davide Chiumiento but ultimately lost 4–2 on penalties.

The Whitecaps kicked off their second MLS season on March 10 against rivals Montreal Impact in front of a sold-out crowd of 21,000 at BC Place. This was the first match between the two storied rival squads in Major League Soccer. The Whitecaps scored early with Sébastien Le Toux registering his first goal for Vancouver in the 4th minute after receiving a flicked on header from Eric Hassli before sliding the ball passed goalkeeper Donovan Ricketts. In the league's seventeen season history, Le Toux's strike was the fastest opening goal ever to start a season. The Whitecaps increased their lead when 2011 leading scorer, Camilo, scored his first goal of the season in the 54th minute. Joe Cannon made five saves to earn his first win, and clean sheet, of the season as the Whitecaps won their season opener 2–0. The match was watched by an average of 541,000 viewers in Canada, with a total of 2.5 million people tuning in for at least a portion of the match, on TSN and RDS making it the most-viewed MLS game ever in the country.

Vancouver played their first road match of the season on March 17 against Chivas USA at The Home Depot Center. Captain Jay DeMerit scored the lone goal, his first as a Whitecap, of the match with a header off a corner kick in the 68th minute. Goalkeepers Joe Cannon and Brad Knighton combined for the clean sheet and the Whitecaps won their first away match in their MLS history. Knighton replaced Cannon who was subbed off with an injury in the 41st minute. Joe Cannon was awarded the MLS Save of the Week for his stop on Casey Townsend in the 32nd minute.

The Whitecaps continued their shutout streak on March 24 with a 0–0 draw against D.C. United. Cannon was awarded with his second consecutive Save of the Week after blocking a Hamdi Salihi header off a corner kick in the 67th minute. Vancouver capped off the month of March with their fourth clean sheet of the season but, once again, failed to score themselves against the Philadelphia Union.

=== April ===
The Whitecaps saw their four-match unbeaten streak to open the season end on April 7 against the San Jose Earthquakes. Sébastien Le Toux scored a second half goal for Vancouver, but Chris Wondolowski replied with a brace as San Jose won 3–1. The match also saw the Whitecaps set a new MLS record for shutout streak to open a season end at 427 minutes, a mark previously set by the New York Red Bulls at 421 minutes.

John Furlong, former CEO of VANOC for the 2010 Winter Olympics, was named Executive Chair of the Whitecaps on April 12.

Vancouver suffered their second consecutive 3–1 at the hands of Sporting Kansas City on April 18, before rebounding to beat both FC Dallas and Columbus Crew 1–0 on April 21 and 28, respectively. Camilo and Lee Young-Pyo scored the respective goals.

=== May ===
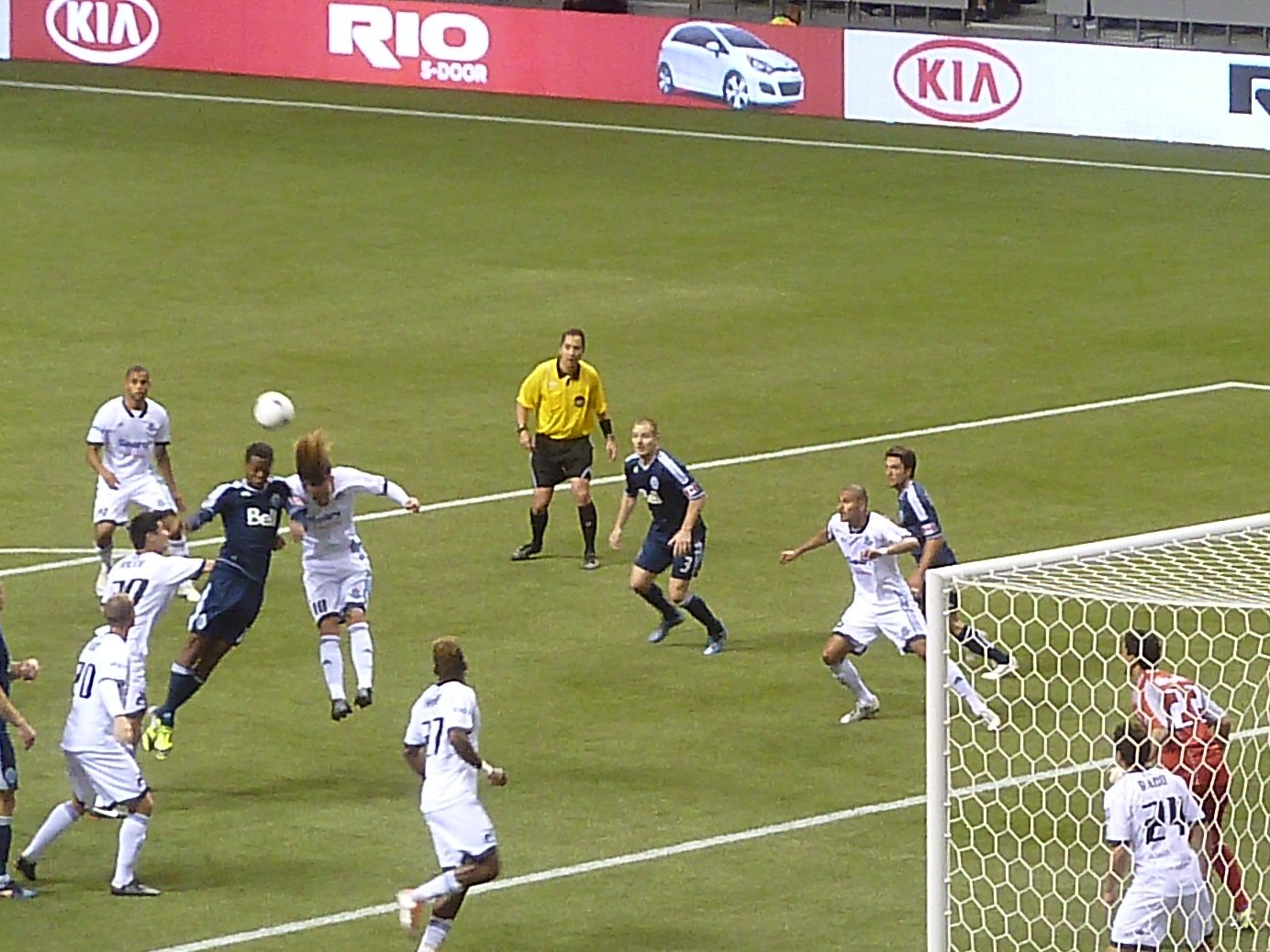
The Whitecaps met FC Edmonton in the 2012 Canadian Championship semi-final first leg in May, and beat them 2–0.

The Whitecaps opened the month of May with the first leg of their semi-final fixture for the 2012 Canadian Championship in an away match against FC Edmonton of the NASL. They earned a 2–0 victory over their Canadian rivals with goals from Eric Hassli and Atiba Harris while Brad Knighton earned the clean sheet in his first start for the club. On May 5, the Whitecaps had a re-match with the San Jose Earthquakes at BC Place. Vancouver were able to defeat San Jose 2–1 despite falling behind in the 15th minute. Eric Hassli scored in the final minute of stoppage time to give the club its first ever win when trailing in a match. The match took place exactly thirty-eight years since the Whitecaps played their first ever competitive match as a club, also against the San Jose Earthquakes, where they were defeated by the same 2–1 scoreline.

On May 12, the Whitecaps suffered their worst defeat of the season to date, dropping a 4–1 decision to the New England Revolution. Lee Nguyen, who was waived by the Whitecaps in the preseason, scored two goals and helped set up another. Vancouver drew 1–1 against Toronto FC in the first leg of the Canadian Championship. Ryan Johnson put the visitors ahead but Eric Hassli scored in stoppage time to salvage a draw. Hassli's goal was described by analysts as "jaw-dropping" and compared to his goal against Seattle Sounders FC in 2011, which received international acclaim and was a finalist for the 2011 Best Play ESPY Award and runner-up for MLS goal of the year.

Vancouver opened the 2012 Cascadia Cup against Seattle Sounders FC at BC Place on May 19. Twice the Whitecaps earned the lead with goals from Alain Rochat and Camilo but both were answered by Eddie Johnson and Fredy Montero for Seattle with the match finishing in a 2–2 draw. Vancouver failed to win their first Canadian Championship losing 1–0 to Toronto FC, 2–1 on aggregate. The Whitecaps ended the month in Portland where they drew 1–1 with the Timbers. Darren Mattocks scored his first MLS goal in the 84th minute to pull the Whitecaps even.

=== June ===
On June 15, the Vancouver Whitecaps unveiled their new third kit. The design featured an arbutus brown colour with sky blue trim. The new kit debuted on June 17 against Colorado, where the Whitecaps won 1–0. On June 18, the club introduced Barry Robson to the media. Robson became eligible to join the line-up on June 27. On June 28, the Whitecaps waived midfielder Floyd Franks and traded forward Tan Long to D.C. United.

=== July ===
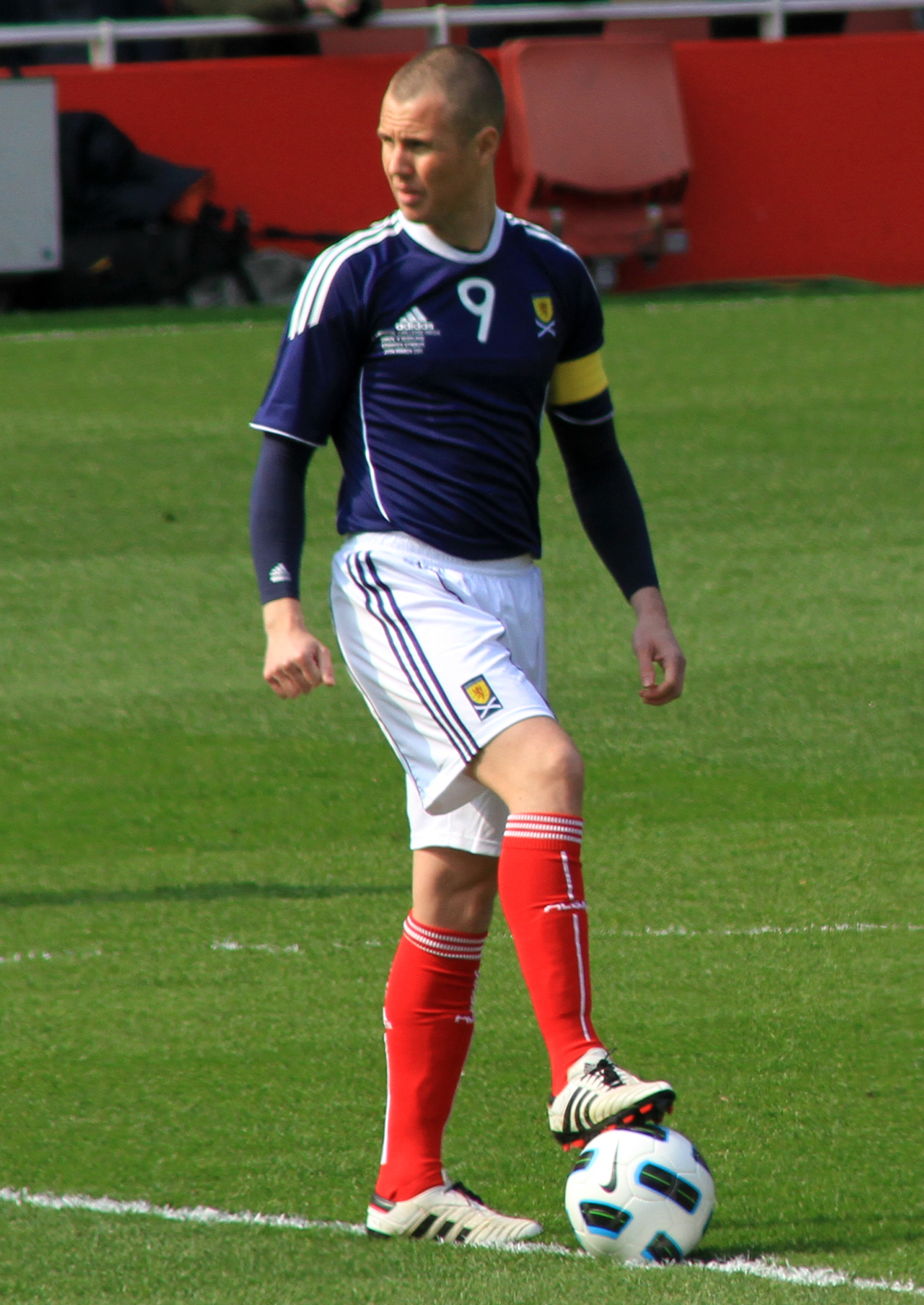
Kenny Miller was signed July 16 as the club's third designated player, fourth to date.

Barry Robson made his club debut on July 4 against Colorado. Robson was named to the starting eleven by Martin Rennie and played 57 minutes before being subbed off. The Whitecaps won the match 1–0 on a goal by Darren Mattocks. The win brought Vancouver to 29 points, eclipsing their total of 28 points in 2011. On July 8, captain Jay DeMerit was named to the MLS All-Star first XI. The 2012 MLS All-Star game took place July 25 at PPL Park in Philadelphia. The MLS All-Stars defeated UEFA Champions League and FA Cup holders Chelsea 3–2.

On July 11 it was announced that Davide Chiumiento would be transferred to FC Zürich. Further moves were made on July 13 when Sébastien Le Toux was traded to New York Red Bulls in exchange for Dane Richards. On July 16 the Whitecaps announced the addition of a third designated player, captain of the Scottish national team, Kenny Miller. Miller made his Whitecaps debut coming off the bench against San Jose a week later.

On July 20 Martin Rennie made more moves by trading away the club's first ever designated player Eric Hassli to Toronto FC in exchange for a first-round pick in the 2014 MLS SuperDraft and an international roster slot through the 2013 season. This also freed an international slot for the club in addition to the slot acquired from the trade.

=== August ===
The club made two depth acquisitions to begin the month of August signing Irish centre back Andy O'Brien and Brazilian midfielder Tiago Ulisses. O'Brien made his debut coming off the bench against Real Salt Lake on August 11.

=== October ===
On October 21 the Vancouver Whitecaps became the first Canadian MLS team to qualify for the MLS Playoffs. They entered the day needing either a win against Portland, an FC Dallas defeat, or a draw with Portland and a FC Dallas draw with Seattle. Vancouver fell 0–1 but still clinched as the Sounders defeated Dallas 3–1.

=== November ===
The team lost their one-game playoff game against Los Angeles Galaxy 2–1 despite opening the scoring in the third minute of the match. The Galaxy eventually went on to win the MLS Cup.

== Players ==
=== Squad information ===
As of August 8, 2012

No.	Player	Nationality	Position	Date of birth (age as of Nov. 1)	Previous club
Goalkeepers
1	Joe Cannon	United States	GK	January 1, 1975 (aged 37)	San Jose Earthquakes
18	Brad Knighton	United States	GK	February 6, 1985 (aged 27)	Carolina RailHawks
24	Brian Sylvestre	United States	GK	December 19, 1992 (aged 19)	Vancouver Whitecaps Residency
Defenders
3	Jordan Harvey	United States	LB	January 28, 1984 (aged 28)	Philadelphia Union
4	Alain Rochat	Switzerland	LB	February 1, 1983 (aged 29)	Vancouver Whitecaps (USSF-D2)
6	Jay DeMerit	United States	CB	December 4, 1979 (aged 32)	Watford
12	Lee Young-Pyo	South Korea	RB	April 23, 1977 (aged 35)	Al-Hilal
15	Martín Bonjour	Argentina	CB	April 9, 1985 (aged 27)	Rampla Juniors
19	Carlyle Mitchell	Trinidad and Tobago	CB	August 8, 1987 (aged 25)	Joe Public
32	Greg Klazura	United States	RB	January 27, 1988 (aged 24)	Notre Dame Fighting Irish
40	Andy O'Brien	Ireland	CB	June 29, 1979 (aged 33)	Leeds United
Midfielders
11	John Thorrington	United States	CM	November 17, 1979 (aged 32)	Chicago Fire
13	Michael Nanchoff	United States	CM	September 24, 1988 (aged 24)	Akron Zips
14	Barry Robson	Scotland	CM	November 7, 1978 (aged 33)	Middlesbrough
16	Matt Watson	England	CM	January 1, 1985 (aged 27)	Carolina RailHawks
20	Dane Richards	Jamaica	RW	December 14, 1983 (aged 28)	New York Red Bulls
23	Tiago Ulisses	Brazil	MF	May 9, 1989 (aged 23)	Botafogo-SP
27	Jun Marques Davidson	Japan	DM	June 7, 1983 (aged 29)	Tokushima Vortis
28	Gershon Koffie	Ghana	MF	August 25, 1991 (aged 21)	Vancouver Whitecaps (USSF-D2)
31	Russell Teibert	Canada	LW	December 22, 1992 (aged 19)	Vancouver Whitecaps (USSF-D2)
36	Bryce Alderson	Canada	MF	February 5, 1994 (aged 18)	Vancouver Whitecaps FC Residency
Forwards
7	Kenny Miller	Scotland	FW	December 23, 1979 (aged 32)	Cardiff City
8	Etienne Barbara	Malta	FW	June 10, 1982 (aged 30)	Carolina RailHawks
9	Atiba Harris	Saint Kitts and Nevis	FW	January 9, 1985 (aged 27)	FC Dallas
17	Omar Salgado	United States	FW	September 10, 1993 (aged 19)	Guadalajara
22	Darren Mattocks	Jamaica	FW	September 2, 1990 (aged 22)	Akron Zips
34	Caleb Clarke	Canada	FW	June 23, 1993 (aged 19)	Vancouver Whitecaps FC Residency
37	Camilo	Brazil	FW	July 21, 1988 (aged 24)	Gyeongnam

=== Transfers in ===
Date	Player	Position	Previous club	Fee/notes	Ref
November 17, 2011	(Canada) Bryce Alderson	MF	(Canada) Vancouver (Residency)	Free	
December 6, 2011	(South Korea) Lee Young-Pyo	DF	(Saudi Arabia) Al-Hilal	Free	
December 15, 2011	(United States) Lee Nguyen	MF	(Vietnam) Becamex Binh Duong F.C.	Free, Weighted lottery process	
December 16, 2011	(England) Matt Watson	MF	(United States) Carolina RailHawks	Free	
January 6, 2012	(Argentina) Martín Bonjour	DF	(Uruguay) Rampla Juniors	Undisclosed terms	
January 12, 2012	(Jamaica) Darren Mattocks	FW	(United States) University of Akron Zips	2012 MLS SuperDraft	
January 17, 2012	(United States) Brad Knighton	GK	(United States) Carolina RailHawks	Free	
January 19, 2012	(Japan) Jun Marques Davidson	MF	(Japan) Tokushima Vortis	Undisclosed	
January 31, 2012	(France) Sébastien Le Toux	FW	(United States) Philadelphia Union	Acquired for allocation money	
February 16, 2012	(Scotland) Barry Robson	MF	(England) Middlesbrough	Free transfer, pre-contract. Joined club in July.	
February 22, 2012	(United States) Greg Klazura	DF	(United States) Notre Dame Fighting Irish	Supplemental Draft, 2nd round	
February 28, 2012	(Malta) Etienne Barbara	FW	(United States) Carolina RailHawks	Discovery rights acquired from Montreal. Signed February 28, 2012	
March 6, 2012	(United States) Floyd Franks	MF	(United States) Carolina RailHawks	Free	
April 24, 2012	(Canada) Caleb Clarke	FW	(Canada) Vancouver (Residency)	Free	
July 13, 2012	(Jamaica) Dane Richards	MF	(United States) New York Red Bulls	Acquired for Sébastien Le Toux	
July 16, 2012	(Scotland) Kenny Miller	FW	(Wales) Cardiff City	Transfer, undisclosed fee	
August 1, 2012	(Republic of Ireland) Andy O'Brien	DF	(England) Leeds United A.F.C.	Transfer, undisclosed fee	
August 3, 2012	(Brazil) Tiago Ulisses	MF	(Brazil) Botafogo Futebol Clube	Transfer, undisclosed fee	

=== Transfers out ===
Date	Player	Position	Destination club	Fee/notes	Ref
November 7, 2011	(Cameroon) Alexandre Morfaw	MF		Waived	
November 23, 2011	(United States) Jeb Brovsky	MF	(Canada) Montreal Impact	Expansion Draft	
November 23, 2011	(Tanzania) Nizar Khalfan	MF	(United States) Philadelphia Union	Waived, free transfer	
November 23, 2011	(United States) Bilal Duckett	DF		Waived	
November 30, 2011	(United States) Shea Salinas	MF	(United States) San Jose Earthquakes	Traded for allocation money	
December 5, 2011	(United States) Jay Nolly	GK	(United States) Chicago Fire	Traded for a 2013 MLS Supplemental Draft Round 1 pick	
December 29, 2011	(United States) Greg Janicki	DF	(United States) San Antonio Scorpions	Waived	
December 29, 2011	(United States) Jonathan Leathers	DF		Waived	
December 29, 2011	(United States) Peter Vagenas	MF	(United States) C.D. Chivas USA	Waived	
January 20, 2012	(The Gambia) Mustapha Jarju	FW	(Belgium) R.A.E.C. Mons	Contract terminated. Later re-signed with RAEC Mons on January 25, 2012.	
January 20, 2012	(Canada) Philippe Davies	MF		Option declined	
March 1, 2012	(United States) Lee Nguyen	MF	(United States) New England Revolution	Waived. Later selected by New England in waiver draft on March 2, 2012.	
June 22, 2012	(New Zealand) Michael Boxall	DF	(New Zealand) Wellington Phoenix FC	Waived	
June 28, 2012	(United States) Floyd Franks	MF	(United States) Carolina RailHawks	Waived	
June 28, 2012	(China) Tan Long	FW	(United States) D.C. United	Traded for 2015 MLS SuperDraft Round 3 pick	
July 11, 2012	(Switzerland) Davide Chiumiento	MF	(Switzerland) FC Zürich	Transfer fee undisclosed	
July 13, 2012	(France) Sébastien Le Toux	FW	(United States) New York Red Bulls	Traded for Dane Richards and allocation money.	
July 20, 2012	(France) Eric Hassli	FW	(Canada) Toronto FC	Traded for 2014 MLS SuperDraft Round 1 pick and international roster spot through 2013.	

== Club ==
=== Front office and staff ===
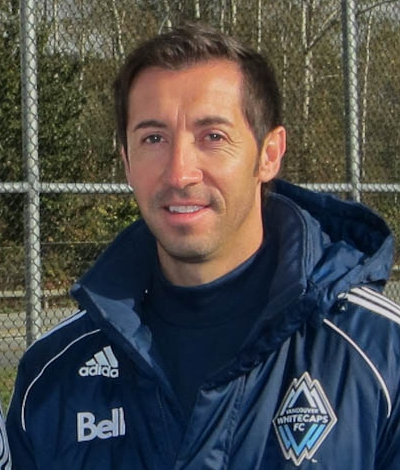
Martin Rennie was hired as the new Vancouver Whitecaps FC head coach on August 9, 2011.

Position	Staff
Owners	CAN Greg Kerfoot; USA Stephen Luczo; CAN Jeff Mallett; CAN Steve Nash
President	CAN Bob Lenarduzzi
Head Coach	SCO Martin Rennie
Director of Operations	USA Tom Soehn
Assistant Coaches	USA Jake DeClute; SCO Paul Ritchie; WAL Carl Robinson
Staff Coach	CAN Martin Nash
Goalkeeper Coach	NOR Marius Røvde
Scouting Coordinator	USA Jake DeClute
Head Athletic Trainer	USA Jake Joachim
Physiotherapist	CAN Graeme Pool
Head of Sports Medicine & Science	CAN Rick Celebrini
Strength & Conditioning Coach	USA Mike Young

As of March 15, 2012

== Statistics ==
=== Appearances and goals ===
No.	Pos	Nat	Player	Total		Major League Soccer		MLS Cup Playoffs		Canadian Championship	
No.	Pos	Nat	Player	Apps	Goals	Apps	Goals	Apps	Goals	Apps	Goals
1	GK	(United States) USA	Joe Cannon	28	0	26+0	0	0+0	0	2+0	0
3	DF	(United States) USA	Jordan Harvey	30	1	18+8	1	1+0	0	2+1	0
4	DF	(Switzerland) SUI	Alain Rochat	31	2	27+0	2	1+0	0	3+0	0
6	DF	(United States) USA	Jay DeMerit	35	1	31+0	1	1+0	0	3+0	0
7	FW	(Scotland) SCO	Kenny Miller	14	2	8+5	2	0+1	0	0+0	0
8	FW	(Malta) MLT	Etienne Barbara	4	0	0+2	0	0+0	0	1+1	0
9	FW	(Saint Kitts and Nevis) SKN	Atiba Harris	8	1	3+4	0	0+0	0	1+0	1
11	MF	(United States) USA	John Thorrington	24	0	14+5	0	1+0	0	4+0	0
12	DF	(South Korea) KOR	Lee Young-Pyo	36	1	33+0	1	1+0	0	2+0	0
13	MF	(United States) USA	Michael Nanchoff	11	0	1+8	0	0+0	0	1+1	0
14	MF	(Scotland) SCO	Barry Robson	18	3	16+1	3	1+0	0	0+0	0
15	DF	(Argentina) ARG	Martín Bonjour	31	1	27+1	1	0+1	0	2+0	0
16	MF	(England) ENG	Matt Watson	17	0	10+5	0	1+0	0	1+0	0
17	FW	(United States) USA	Omar Salgado	8	0	5+2	0	0+0	0	1+0	0
18	GK	(United States) USA	Brad Knighton	13	0	8+2	0	1+0	0	2+0	0
19	DF	(Trinidad and Tobago) TTO	Carlyle Mitchell	4	0	2+0	0	0+0	0	2+0	0
20	MF	(Jamaica) JAM	Dane Richards	13	3	9+3	3	0+1	0	0+0	0
22	FW	(Jamaica) JAM	Darren Mattocks	25	9	15+6	7	1+0	1	0+3	1
23	FW	(Brazil) BRA	Tiago Ulisses	0	0	0+0	0	0+0	0	0+0	0
24	GK	(United States) USA	Brian Sylvestre	0	0	0+0	0	0+0	0	0+0	0
27	MF	(Japan) JPN	Jun Marques Davidson	26	0	24+0	0	0+0	0	2+0	0
28	MF	(Ghana) GHA	Gershon Koffie	32	3	28+1	3	1+0	0	2+0	0
31	MF	(Canada) CAN	Russell Teibert	4	0	1+3	0	0+0	0	0+0	0
32	DF	(United States) USA	Greg Klazura	2	0	0+0	0	0+0	0	2+0	0
34	FW	(Canada) CAN	Caleb Clarke	2	0	0+2	0	0+0	0	0+0	0
36	MF	(Canada) CAN	Bryce Alderson	0	0	0+0	0	0+0	0	0+0	0
37	FW	(Brazil) BRA	Camilo	31	5	19+9	5	0+0	0	3+0	0
40	DF	(Ireland) EIR	Andy O'Brien	9	0	7+1	0	1+0	0	0+0	0
—	DF	(New Zealand) NZL	Michael Boxall	0	0	0+0	0	0+0	0	0+0	0
—	MF	(Switzerland) SUI	Davide Chiumiento	20	0	15+1	0	0+0	0	2+2	0
—	FW	(France) FRA	Eric Hassli	22	4	9+9	2	0+0	0	3+1	2
—	MF	(United States) USA	Floyd Franks	2	0	0+1	0	0+0	0	1+0	0
—	FW	(France) FRA	Sébastien Le Toux	22	6	18+1	4	0+0	0	2+1	2
—	FW	(China) CHN	Tan Long	5	0	0+4	0	0+0	0	0+1	0

Last updated: January 7, 2013
Source: Vancouver Whitecaps FC
Italic: denotes player is no longer with team

=== Goalkeeper stats ===
No.	Nat.	Player	Total				Major League Soccer				MLS Cup Playoffs				Canadian Championship			
No.	Nat.	Player	MIN	SV	GA	GAA	MIN	SV	GA	GAA	MIN	SV	GA	GAA	MIN	SV	GA	GAA
1	(United States)	Joe Cannon	2,457	79	36	1.32	2,277	73	34	1.34	0	0	0	0.00	180	6	2	1.00
18	(United States)	Brad Knighton	1,052	40	10	0.86	782	27	7	0.81	90	5	2	2.00	180	8	1	0.50
24	(United States)	Brian Sylvestre	0	0	0	0.00	0	0	0	0.00	0	0	0	0.00	0	0	0	0.00

Updated to match played January 7, 2013
Source: Vancouver Whitecaps FC
Italic: denotes player is no longer with team

=== Starting XI ===

Configuration based in August 2012 starting lineups.

=== Top scorers ===
Includes all competitive matches. The list is sorted by shirt number when total goals are equal.

Ran	No.	Pos	Nat	Name	Major League Soccer	MLS Playoffs	Canadian Championship	Total
1	22	FW	(Jamaica)	Darren Mattocks	7	1	1	9
2	—	FW	(France)	Sébastien Le Toux	4	0	2	6
3	37	FW	(Brazil)	Camilo	5	0	0	5
4	—	FW	(France)	Eric Hassli	2	0	2	4
5	14	MF	(Scotland)	Barry Robson	3	0	0	3
5	20	MF	(Jamaica)	Dane Richards	3	0	0	3
5	28	MF	(Ghana)	Gershon Koffie	3	0	0	3
8	4	DF	(Switzerland)	Alain Rochat	2	0	0	2
8	7	FW	(Scotland)	Kenny Miller	2	0	0	2
10	—	—	—	Four players tied with 1 goal each				
TOTALS					35	1	6	42

As of January 7, 2013

Italic: denotes player is no longer with team

=== Top assists ===
Includes all competitive matches. The list is sorted by shirt number when total assists are equal.

Ran	No.	Pos	Nat	Name	Major League Soccer	MLS Cup Playoffs	Canadian Championship	Total
1	—	MF	(Switzerland)	Davide Chiumiento	5	0	3	8
2	37	FW	(Brazil)	Camilo	7	0	0	7
3	12	DF	(South Korea)	Lee Young-Pyo	4	0	0	4
4	4	DF	(Switzerland)	Alain Rochat	2	0	1	3
4	—	FW	(France)	Eric Hassli	3	0	0	3
6	3	DF	(United States)	Jordan Harvey	2	0	0	2
6	14	MF	(Scotland)	Barry Robson	2	0	0	2
6	17	FW	(United States)	Omar Salgado	1	0	1	2
6	28	MF	(Ghana)	Gershon Koffie	2	0	0	2
10	—	—	—	Ten players tied with 1 assist each				
TOTALS					35	1	6	42

As of January 7, 2013

Italic: denotes player is no longer with team

=== Disciplinary record ===
Includes all competitive matches. The list is sorted by position, and then shirt number.

N	P	Nat.	Name	Major League Soccer			Canadian Championship			N/A			Others			Total			Notes
N	P	Nat.	Name	Yellow card	Second yellow card	Red card	Yellow card	Second yellow card	Red card	Yellow card	Second yellow card	Red card	Yellow card	Second yellow card	Red card	Yellow card	Second yellow card	Red card	Notes
1	GK	(United States)	Joe Cannon			1												1	
18	GK	(United States)	Brad Knighton																
24	GK	(United States)	Brian Sylvestre																
3	DF	(United States)	Jordan Harvey	1			1									2			
4	DF	(Switzerland)	Alain Rochat	6												6			
6	DF	(United States)	Jay DeMerit	3												3			
12	DF	(South Korea)	Lee Young-Pyo	1												1			
15	DF	(Argentina)	Martín Bonjour	5			1									6			
19	DF	(Trinidad and Tobago)	Carlyle Mitchell																
32	DF	(United States)	Greg Klazura																
11	MF	(United States)	John Thorrington	1			1									2			
13	MF	(United States)	Michael Nanchoff																
14	MF	(Scotland)	Barry Robson	1												1			
16	MF	(England)	Matt Watson	1												1			
20	MF	(Jamaica)	Dane Richards																
23	MF	(Brazil)	Tiago Ulisses																
27	MF	(Japan)	Jun Marques Davidson	6												6			
28	MF	(Ghana)	Gershon Koffie	6												6			Suspended August 15 vs. FC Dallas for yellow card accumulation.
31	MF	(Canada)	Russell Teibert																
36	MF	(Canada)	Bryce Alderson																
7	FW	(Scotland)	Kenny Miller																
8	FW	(Malta)	Etienne Barbara																
9	FW	(Saint Kitts and Nevis)	Atiba Harris	1												1			
17	FW	(United States)	Omar Salgado	1												1			
22	FW	(Jamaica)	Darren Mattocks	7	1		2									9	1		
34	FW	(Canada)	Caleb Clarke																
37	FW	(Brazil)	Camilo	1												1			
40	DF	(Ireland)	Andy O'Brien																
—	DF	(New Zealand)	Michael Boxall																
—	MF	(Switzerland)	Davide Chiumiento																
—	MF	(United States)	Floyd Franks																
—	FW	(France)	Eric Hassli	6												6			
—	FW	(France)	Sébastien Le Toux				1	1								1	1		
—	FW	(China)	Long Tan																

Last updated: August 11, 2012
Source: Competitive matches
Ordered by (red card) , (second yellow card) and (yellow card)
(yellow card) = Number of bookings; (second yellow card) = Number of sending offs after a second yellow card; (red card) = Number of sending offs by a direct red card.

Italic: denotes no longer with club.

== Competitions ==
=== Pre-season ===
==== Arizona training ====
February 6	Vancouver	1–1	Seattle	Casa Grande, Arizona
15:00 PST	Camilo 1'; Harris (yellow card) 14'; Bonjour (yellow card) 14'; Boxall (yellow card) 77'; Teibert (yellow card) 103'; Cregg (yellow card) 110'	Report	Parke (yellow card) 20'; Carrasco 48'; Caskey (yellow card) 94'; Vanzie (yellow card) 101'; Banton (red card) 116'; Gutierres (yellow card) 119'	Stadium: Grande Sports World

February 10	Vancouver	1–1	Salt Lake	Casa Grande, Arizona
10:00 PST	Harris (yellow card) 18'; Mattocks 27'; Camilo (yellow card) 45'; Koffie (yellow card) 90'	Report	Bengellou (yellow card) 21'; Tanaka (yellow card) 26'; Espíndola 39' (pen.); Steele (yellow card) 51'; Gil (yellow card) 54'; Salcedo (yellow card) 75'; Schuler (yellow card) 79'	Stadium: Grande Sports World

==== Walt Disney World Pro Soccer Classic ====
February 24 Match 1	Montreal	0–3	Vancouver	Orlando, Florida
17:00 PST	Arnaud (yellow card) 42'; Martins (yellow card) 71'	Recap	Hassli 38', (yellow card) 42'; Camilo (yellow card) 41'; Mattocks 69'; Koffie (yellow card) 75'; Le Toux 83' (pen.)	Stadium: ESPN Wide World of Sports Complex

February 26 Match 2	Vancouver	1–0	Houston	Orlando, Florida
10:00 PST	Le Toux 15' (pen.); Harvey (yellow card) 44'	Recap	Deric (yellow card) 28'; Creavalle (yellow card) 54'	Stadium: ESPN Wide World of Sports Complex

February 29 Match 3	Kansas City	0–3	Vancouver	Orlando, Florida
15:00 PST	César (yellow card) 6'; Collin (yellow card) 16'; Kamara (yellow card) 59'	Recap	Koffie (yellow card) 40'; Harvey (yellow card) 47'; Le Toux 50'; Teibert 62'; Mitchell 67'	Stadium: ESPN Wide World of Sports Complex

March 3 Championship	Vancouver	1–0	Toronto	Orlando, Florida
17:00 PST	Camilo 10'; Mattocks (yellow card) 25'; Teibert (yellow card) 87'	Recap	Makubua (yellow card) 2'	Stadium: ESPN Wide World of Sports Complex; Referee: Mark Geiger

==== Friendlies ====
February 19	Victoria	1–2	Vancouver	Victoria, British Columbia
13:00 PST	Gorman 67' (pen.)	Recap	Chiumiento 11' (pen.); Davidson (yellow card) 39' (yellow-red card) 65'; Watson 52'	Stadium: Centennial Stadium; Attendance: 2,831

March 4 Community Shield	Carolina	2–2 (4–2 p)	Vancouver	Cary, North Carolina
12:00 PST	Lowery 6'; Shriver 71'	Recap	Tan 49'; Chiumiento 90'	Stadium: WakeMed Soccer Park; Referee: Terry Vaughn
	Penalties
	Stockley (penalty scored); Drake (penalty scored); Miller (penalty scored); Shipalane (penalty scored)		(penalty scored) Le Toux; (penalty scored) Chiumiento; (penalty missed) Tan; (penalty missed) Knighton

=== Overall ===
Competition	Started round	Current position / round	Final position / round	First match	Last match
Pro Soccer Classic	Group stage	—	Winner	February 24	March 3
Major League Soccer	—	—	5th, West; 11th, Overall	March 10	October 27
MLS Cup Playoffs	Play-in Round	Play-in Round		November 1	
Canadian Championship	Semi-finals	—	Runners-up	May 2	May 23
Cascadia Cup	—	—	3rd	May 19	October 21

Updated to match played October 28, 2012
Source: Competitions

=== Major League Soccer ===
==== League table ====
===== Western Conference =====
Pos	Team	Pld	W	L	T	GF	GA	GD	Pts	Qualification
1	San Jose Earthquakes	34	19	6	9	72	43	+29	66	Qualification for the conference semifinals
2	Real Salt Lake	34	17	11	6	46	35	+11	57	Qualification for the conference semifinals
3	Seattle Sounders FC	34	15	8	11	51	33	+18	56	Qualification for the conference semifinals
4	LA Galaxy	34	16	12	6	59	47	+12	54	Qualification for the knockout round
5	Vancouver Whitecaps FC	34	11	13	10	35	41	−6	43	Qualification for the knockout round
6	FC Dallas	34	9	13	12	42	47	−5	39	
7	Colorado Rapids	34	11	19	4	44	50	−6	37	
8	Portland Timbers	34	8	16	10	34	56	−22	34	
9	Chivas USA	34	7	18	9	24	58	−34	30	

Source: MLS

===== Overall =====
Pos	Team	Pld	W	L	T	GF	GA	GD	Pts	
1	San Jose Earthquakes (S)	34	19	6	9	72	43	+29	66	Qualification for the CONCACAF Champions League
2	Sporting Kansas City (U)	34	18	7	9	42	27	+15	63	Qualification for the CONCACAF Champions League
3	D.C. United	34	17	10	7	53	43	+10	58	
4	New York Red Bulls	34	16	9	9	57	46	+11	57	
5	Real Salt Lake	34	17	11	6	46	35	+11	57	
6	Chicago Fire	34	17	11	6	46	41	+5	57	
7	Seattle Sounders FC	34	15	8	11	51	33	+18	56	
8	LA Galaxy (C)	34	16	12	6	59	47	+12	54	Qualification for the CONCACAF Champions League
9	Houston Dynamo	34	14	9	11	48	41	+7	53	Qualification for the CONCACAF Champions League
10	Columbus Crew	34	15	12	7	44	44	0	52	
11	Vancouver Whitecaps FC	34	11	13	10	35	41	−6	43	
12	Montreal Impact	34	12	16	6	45	51	−6	42	Qualification for the CONCACAF Champions League
13	FC Dallas	34	9	13	12	42	47	−5	39	
14	Colorado Rapids	34	11	19	4	44	50	−6	37	
15	Philadelphia Union	34	10	18	6	37	45	−8	36	
16	New England Revolution	34	9	17	8	39	44	−5	35	
17	Portland Timbers	34	8	16	10	34	56	−22	34	
18	Chivas USA	34	7	18	9	24	58	−34	30	
19	Toronto FC (V)	34	5	21	8	36	62	−26	23	

Source: MLS
Rules for classification: 1) points; 2) head-to-head record; 3) goal difference; 4) number of goals scored
(C) MLS Cup champions; (S) Supporters' Shield winners; (U) U.S. Open Cup winners; (V) Canadian Championship winners

==== Results summary ====
Overall								Home						Away					
Pld	Pts	W	L	D	GF	GA	GD	W	L	D	GF	GA	GD	W	L	D	GF	GA	GD
34	43	11	13	10	35	41	−6	8	3	6	25	17	+8	3	10	4	10	24	−14

Last updated: October 28, 2012
Source: MLSSoccer.com
Pld = Matches played; Pts = Points; W = Matches won; D = Matches drawn; L = Matches lost; GF = Goals for; GA = Goals against; GD = Goal difference

==== Results by round ====
Round	1	2	3	4	5	6	7	8	9	10	11	12	13	14	15	16	17	18	19	20	21	22	23	24	25	26	27	28	29	30	31	32	33	34
Ground	H	A	H	A	A	H	H	A	H	A	H	A	H	H	H	A	A	A	A	A	H	H	A	H	H	A	A	A	A	H	H	H	H	A
Result	W	W	D	D	L	L	W	W	W	L	D	D	W	W	D	L	W	D	L	L	D	W	L	W	L	L	L	L	L	D	D	W	L	D

Updated to match(es) played on October 27, 2012. Source: MLS results
A = Away; H = Home; W = Win; D = Draw; L = Loss

==== Match results ====
Schedule

Win Draw Loss

March 10 1	Vancouver	2–0	Montreal	Vancouver, British Columbia
15:00 PST	Le Toux 4'; Camilo 54'; Bonjour (yellow card) 58'	Recap	Felipe (yellow card) 19'; Bernier (yellow card) 28'	Stadium: BC Place; Attendance: 21,000; Referee: Ricardo Salazar

March 17 2	Chivas	0–1	Vancouver	Carson, California
19:30 PDT	Minda (yellow card) 35'	Recap	Davidson (yellow card) 63'; DeMerit 68'; Hassli (yellow card) 89'	Stadium: The Home Depot Center; Attendance: 7,723; Referee: Jair Marrufo

March 24 3	Vancouver	0–0	D.C.	Vancouver, British Columbia
19:00 PDT	Hassli (yellow card) 33'	Recap	Santos (yellow card) 35'; Pontius (yellow card) 70'	Stadium: BC Place; Attendance: 19,394; Referee: Kevin Stott

March 31 4	Philadelphia	0–0	Vancouver	Chester, Pennsylvania
16:00 PDT	Gómez (yellow card) 43'; Carroll (yellow card) 56'; M. Farfan (yellow card) 77'	Recap	Harris (yellow card) 65'	Stadium: PPL Park; Attendance: 17,189; Referee: Elias Bazakos

April 7 5	San Jose	3–1	Vancouver	Santa Clara, California
16:00 PDT	Wondolowski 68', 78'; Gordon 72'; Corrales (yellow card) 90+2'	Recap	Davidson (yellow card) 11'; Bonjour (yellow card) 37'; Y.P. Lee (yellow card) 45+2'; Le Toux 49'	Stadium: Buck Shaw Stadium; Attendance: 10,525; Referee: Ramon Hernandez

April 18 6	Vancouver	1–3	Kansas City	Vancouver, British Columbia
19:00 PDT	Hassli (yellow card) 6'; DeMerit (yellow card) 67'; Le Toux 79'	Recap	Collin (yellow card) 18', (goal) 24'; Nagamura (yellow card) 38'; Bonjour 51' (o.g.); Kamara 65'; Nielsen (yellow card) 80'	Stadium: BC Place; Attendance: 15,382; Referee: Baldomero Toledo

April 21 7	Vancouver	1–0	Dallas	Vancouver, British Columbia
19:00 PDT	Camilo 11'; Koffie (yellow card) 38'; Watson (yellow card) 57'	Recap	Blas Pérez (yellow card) 75'; Rodríguez (yellow card) 90'	Stadium: BC Place; Attendance: 18,027; Referee: Edvin Jurisevic

April 28 8	Columbus	0–1	Vancouver	Columbus, Ohio
16:30 PDT	Marshall (yellow card) 81'; O'Rourke (yellow card) 87'	Recap	Harvey (yellow card) 50'; Koffie (yellow card) 67'; Y.P. Lee 74'	Stadium: Columbus Crew Stadium; Attendance: 11,978; Referee: Elias Bazakos

May 5 9	Vancouver	2–1	San Jose	Vancouver, British Columbia
16:00 PDT	Koffie 40'; Davidson (yellow card) 90+2'; Hassli 90+4'	Recap	Wondolowski 15'; Cronin (yellow card) 52'; Beitashour (yellow card) 54'; Chávez (yellow card) 54'	Stadium: BC Place; Attendance: 19,271; Referee: Chris Penso

May 12 10	New England	4–1	Vancouver	Foxborough, Massachusetts
16:30 PDT	Nguyen 6', 72'; Sène 24'; Joseph 33', (yellow card) 45+2'	Recap	Hassli 5', (yellow card) 90'; Koffie (yellow card) 44'; Salgado (yellow card) 61'; Mattocks (yellow card) 64'	Stadium: Gillette Stadium; Attendance: 12,112; Referee: Silviu Petrescu

May 19 11^{a}	Vancouver	2–2	Seattle	Vancouver, British Columbia
14:00 PDT	Rochat 12'; Camilo 82', (yellow card) 90+3'; Koffie (yellow card) 84'	Recap	Johnson 47'; Montero 90'	Stadium: BC Place; Attendance: 21,000; Referee: Kevin Stott

May 26 12^{a}	Portland	1–1	Vancouver	Portland, Oregon
19:00 PDT	Smith (yellow card) 40'; Boyd 67'	Recap	Thorrington (yellow card) 23'; Bonjour (yellow card) 70'; Mattocks 84', (yellow card) 90'	Stadium: Jeld-Wen Field; Attendance: 20,438; Referee: Jorge Gonzalez

June 10 13	Vancouver	3–1	Houston	Vancouver, British Columbia
16:00 PDT	Mattocks 4', 66'; Davidson (yellow card) 68'; Harvey 88'	Recap	Davis (yellow card) 80'; Kandji 83'; Carr (yellow card) 86'	Stadium: BC Place; Attendance: 18,811; Referee: Ramon Hernandez

June 16 14	Vancouver	1–0	Colorado	Vancouver, British Columbia
16:00 PDT	Rochat (yellow card) 42'; Mattocks (yellow card) 59' (yellow-red card) 60'; Le Toux 80'	Recap		Stadium: BC Place; Attendance: 19,166; Referee: Jasen Anno

June 20 15	Vancouver	1–1	New York	Vancouver, British Columbia
20:00 PDT	Hassli (yellow card) 67'; Bonjour 75'	Recap	Richards (yellow card) 14'; Lindpere (yellow card) 19'; Pearce 86'	Stadium: BC Place; Attendance: 20,060; Referee: Chris Penso

June 23 16	Los Angeles	3–0	Vancouver	Carson, California
19:30 PDT	Beckham (yellow card) 16'; Magee 16'; Keane 30'; Donovan 41'; Franklin (yellow card) 68'	Recap	Mattocks (yellow card) 24'; Davidson (yellow card) 61'	Stadium: The Home Depot Center; Attendance: 21,529; Referee: Allen Chapman

July 4 17	Colorado	0–1	Vancouver	Commerce City, Colorado
18:30 PDT		Recap	Rochat (yellow card) 41'; Mattocks 43', (yellow card) 90+3'	Stadium: Dick's Sporting Goods Park; Attendance: 18,757; Referee: Dave Gantar

July 7 18	Chivas	0–0	Vancouver	Carson, California
19:30 PDT	LaBrocca (yellow card) 45'; Califf (yellow card) 90+3'	Recap	Rochat (yellow card) 63'; Hassli (yellow card) 64'; Bonjour (yellow card) 71'; Koffie (yellow card) 87'	Stadium: The Home Depot Center; Attendance: 11,659; Referee: Juan Guzman

July 11 19	Toronto	3–2	Vancouver	Toronto, Ontario
16:00 PDT	Silva (yellow card) 38', (goal) 68'; Dunfield (yellow card) 63', (goal) 90+4'; Frings 72'	Recap	Mattocks 50', 90+1'; Rochat (yellow card) 71'	Stadium: BMO Field; Attendance: 19,821; Referee: Fotis Bazakos

July 14 20	Chicago	1–0	Vancouver	Bridgeview, Illinois
17:30 PDT	Pardo 10'; Segares (yellow card) 36'; Alex (yellow card) 41'; Friedrich (yellow card) 67' (yellow-red card) 69'	Recap	Mattocks (yellow card) 12'; Rochat (yellow card) 43'	Stadium: Toyota Park; Attendance: 16,820; Referee: Jose Carlos Rivero

July 18 21	Vancouver	2–2	Los Angeles	Vancouver, British Columbia
19:00 PDT	Koffie 18'; Robson 27'; DeMerit (yellow card) 58'	Recap	Donovan (yellow card) 45+1'; Beckham 81'; Lopes (yellow card) 83'; Villarreal (yellow card) 86', (goal) 87'	Stadium: BC Place; Attendance: 21,000; Referee: Silviu Petrescu

July 22 22	Vancouver	2–1	San Jose	Vancouver, British Columbia
16:00 PDT	Bonjour (yellow card) 11'; Robson (yellow card) 12', (goal) 62' (pen.); Richards 20'	Recap	Beitashour (yellow card) 32'; Gordon 38'	Stadium: BC Place; Attendance: 20,112; Referee: Jair Marrufo

July 27 23	Salt Lake	2–1	Vancouver	Sandy, Utah
18:00 PDT	Saborío 34' (pen.), 58'	Recap	DeMerit (yellow card) 33'; Mattocks 52', (yellow card) 86'; Cannon (red card) 76'	Stadium: Rio Tinto Stadium; Attendance: 18,702; Referee: Kevin Stott

August 11 24	Vancouver	2–1	Salt Lake	Vancouver, British Columbia
16:00 PDT	Rochat (yellow card) 41'; Koffie (yellow card) 49'; Camilo 58'; Richards 64'	Recap	Beltran (yellow card) 37'; Borchers 90+2'	Stadium: BC Place; Attendance: 20,083; Referee: Paul Ward

August 15 25	Vancouver	0–2	Dallas	Vancouver, British Columbia
19:00 PDT	Bonjour (yellow card) 34'; Camilo (yellow card) 45+1'; Nanchoff (yellow card) 81'; Lee (yellow card) 86'; Davidson (yellow card) 86'; Robson (yellow card) 90+5'	Recap	Hernández (yellow card) 46'; Castillo 60'; Top 70'; Jacobson (yellow card) 83'; Ferreira (yellow card) 86'	Stadium: BC Place; Attendance: 19,006; Referee: Matthew Foerster

August 18 26^{a}	Seattle	2–0	Vancouver	Seattle, Washington
13:00 PDT	Hurtado (yellow card) 58'; Montero 64'; Johnson 87'	Recap	Koffie (yellow card) 90+1'	Stadium: CenturyLink Field; Attendance: 55,718; Referee: Silviu Petrescu

August 25 27^{a}	Portland	2–1	Vancouver	Portland, Oregon
19:30 PDT	Nagbe 41'; Songo'o 55'	Recap	Rochat (yellow card) 33'; Miller 45+2'; Thorrington (yellow card) 65'; Mattocks (red card) 84'	Stadium: Jeld-Wen Field; Attendance: 20,438; Referee: Dave Gantar

September 1 28	Los Angeles	2–0	Vancouver	Carson, California
19:00 PDT	Gonzalez (yellow card) 21'; Juninho 41'; Beckham 79'	Recap	Richards (yellow card) 61'; Barbara (yellow card) 90'	Stadium: The Home Depot Center; Attendance: 20,168; Referee: Baldomero Toledo

September 15 29	Dallas	1–0	Vancouver	Frisco, Texas
17:30 PDT	de Guzman (yellow card) 45', (goal) 90+6'	Recap	Bonjour (yellow card) 30'; Harvey (yellow card) 36'; Koffie (yellow card) 53'; Knighton (yellow card) 90+1'	Stadium: FC Dallas Stadium; Referee: Allen Chapman

September 23 30	Vancouver	2–2	Colorado	Vancouver, British Columbia
16:30 PDT	Richards (yellow card) 22'; Camilo (yellow card) 29'; Rochat 64'; Miller 68'	Recap	Cummings 34'; Smith 86'	Stadium: BC Place; Attendance: 18,992; Referee: Drew Fischer

September 29 31^{a}	Vancouver	0–0	Seattle	Vancouver, British Columbia
18:00 PDT	Harvey (yellow card) 49'	Recap	Parke (yellow card) 55'	Stadium: BC Place; Attendance: 21,000; Referee: Silviu Petrescu

October 3 32	Vancouver	4–0	Chivas	Vancouver, British Columbia
19:00 PDT	Koffie 11'; Richards 35'; Camilo 62'; Robson 73'	Recap	Bolaños (yellow card) 43'; Valencia (yellow card) 55'	Stadium: BC Place; Attendance: 17,777; Referee: Hilario Grajeda

October 21 33^{a}	Vancouver	0–1	Portland	Vancouver, British Columbia
16:00 PDT	Sanvezzo (yellow card) 53'; Koffie (yellow card) 80'	Recap	Mosquera (yellow card) 10'; Jewsbury 39'	Stadium: BC Place; Attendance: 21,000; Referee: Juan Guzman

October 27 34	Salt Lake	0–0	Vancouver	Sandy, Utah
18:00 PDT	Wingert (yellow card) 36'; Johnson (yellow card) 82'	Recap	DeMerit (yellow card) 47'	Stadium: Rio Tinto Stadium; Attendance: 20,507; Referee: Baldomero Toledo

===== Note =====
^a Indicates a match against a Cascadia Cup rival.

=== MLS Cup playoffs ===
==== Knockout round ====
November 1 KO	Los Angeles	2–1	Vancouver	Carson, California
19:30 PST	Juninho (yellow card) 43'; Magee 69'; Donovan 73' (pen.); Sarvas (yellow card) 87'	Recap	Mattocks 3'; Bonjour (yellow card) 71'; Y.P. Lee (yellow card) 72'	Stadium: The Home Depot Center; Attendance: 14,703; Referee: Silviu Petrescu

=== Canadian Championship ===
The club participated in the four-team Canadian Championship which included FC Edmonton, the Montreal Impact and Toronto FC. The champion of the tournament was awarded the Voyageurs Cup and qualified for the 2012–13 CONCACAF Champions League group stage. Each round featured a two-legged home-and-away format. The team with the higher aggregate score from both matches was declared the winner. Should there have been a tie in the aggregate score, the away goals rule was used to determine the winner. Should the away goals also have been even, an additional 30 minutes of extra time were played with the away goals rule no longer in effect. The final tiebreaker would be a penalty shoot-out.

==== Semi-finals ====
May 2 First Leg	Edmonton	0–2	Vancouver	Edmonton, Alberta
19:00 PDT	Saiko (yellow card) 66' van Leerdam (yellow card) 74'	Recap	Hassli 19'; Harris 41'; Harvey (yellow card) 72'	Stadium: Commonwealth Stadium; Attendance: 2,777; Referee: Carol Anne Chenard

May 9 Second Leg	Vancouver	3–1 (5–1 agg.)	Edmonton	Vancouver, British Columbia
20:00 PDT	Thorrington (yellow card) 42'; Le Toux 75', 87'; Mattocks 90+3'	Recap	Vorbe (yellow card) 33'; Hamilton (yellow card) 41'; Cox (yellow card) 44'; Kooy (yellow card) 51'; Pinto 54'	Stadium: BC Place; Attendance: 15,011; Referee: Geoff Gamble

==== Final ====
May 16 First Leg	Vancouver	1–1	Toronto	Vancouver, British Columbia
19:00 PDT	Hassli 90+1'	Recap	Hall (yellow card) 11'; Dunfield (yellow card) 49'; Johnson 66'	Stadium: BC Place; Attendance: 14,878; Referee: Drew Fischer

May 23 Second Leg	Toronto	1–0 (2–1 agg.)	Vancouver	Toronto, Ontario
17:00 PDT	Frings (yellow card) 31'; Morgan (yellow card) 48'; De Guzman (red card) 57'; Lambe (yellow card) 75', (goal) 83'; Henry (yellow card) 84'	Recap	Bonjour (yellow card) 36'; Le Toux (yellow card) 45' (yellow-red card) 58'; Mattocks (yellow card) 89'	Stadium: BMO Field; Attendance: 13,777; Referee: Silviu Petrescu

=== MLS reserves ===
The Vancouver Whitecaps will compete in the West Division for the 2012 MLS Reserves season. The division consists of six teams, including Chivas USA, Los Angeles Galaxy, Portland Timbers, Seattle Sounders FC and San Jose Earthquakes. The Whitecaps will play each other team twice, once home and once away.

==== League table ====
West Division

Pos	Team	GP	W	L	D	GF	GA	GD	Pts
1	LA Galaxy (C)	10	6	3	1	22	11	+11	19
2	San Jose Earthquakes	10	5	3	2	15	12	+3	17
3	Seattle Sounders FC	10	4	5	1	18	18	0	13
4	Portland Timbers	10	4	5	1	17	18	–1	13
5	Chivas USA	10	3	4	3	21	21	0	12
6	Vancouver Whitecaps FC	10	3	5	2	11	22	–11	11

Source: MLSsoccer.com

==== Match results ====
Schedule

Win Draw Loss

March 26	Vancouver	1–1	Seattle	Vancouver, British Columbia
11:00 PDT	Mitchell 90+1'	Recap	Steres (yellow card) 36'; González (yellow card) 69'; Caskey 72'	Stadium: Thunderbird Stadium

April 8	San Jose	1–2	Vancouver	San Jose, California
11:00 PDT	Ampaipitakwong 77'	Recap	Tan 38'; Harris 78'	Stadium: Nutrilite Training Facility

April 22	Vancouver	0–3	Portland	Vancouver, British Columbia
15:00 PDT		Recap	Richards 44'; Songo'o 65'; Dike 89'	Stadium: Swangard Stadium

May 27	Portland	1–2	Vancouver	Portland, Oregon
14:00 PDT	Palmer (yellow card) 38'; Fucito (yellow card) 51'; Jean-Baptiste 71'	Recap	Franks 18'; Mattocks 28'; Barbara (yellow card) 38'; Harvey (yellow card) 45'; Knighton (yellow card) 90+4'	Stadium: JELD-WEN Field

June 1	Seattle	1–2	Vancouver	Tukwila, Washington
18:00 PDT	Carrasco (yellow card) 36'; Dismuke 81'	Recap	Mitchell 26', 72'	Stadium: Starfire Sports Complex

June 12	Vancouver	1–3	Los Angeles	Vancouver, British Columbia
11:00 PDT	Nanchoff (yellow card) 13'; Alderson 68'	Recap	Villareal 47', 90+1'; McBean 86'	Stadium: Thunderbird Stadium

July 23	Vancouver	1–3	Chivas USA	Vancouver, British Columbia
11:00 PDT	Froese 57'; Watson (yellow card) 75'	Recap	Chavez (yellow card) 9'; Akwari (yellow card) 19'; Romero (yellow card) 37'; Courtois 41'; Gavin 66'; Romero 70'	Stadium: Thunderbird Stadium

August 3	Chivas USA	1–1	Vancouver	Carson, California
10:00 PDT	Correa 16'	Recap	Harris 14' (pen.), (yellow card) 32'; Klazura (yellow card) 23', Watson (yellow card) 39'	Stadium: The Home Depot Center

September 10	Vancouver	1–2	San Jose	Vancouver, British Columbia
11:00 PDT	Harris 21'; Mitchell (yellow card) 65'	Recap	Fondy 10'; Padilla (yellow card) 61'; Morales 75'; Ventura (yellow card) 84'	Stadium: Thunderbird Stadium

October 7	Los Angeles	v	Vancouver	Carson, California
11:00 PDT				Stadium: To Be Determined

== Cascadia Cup ==
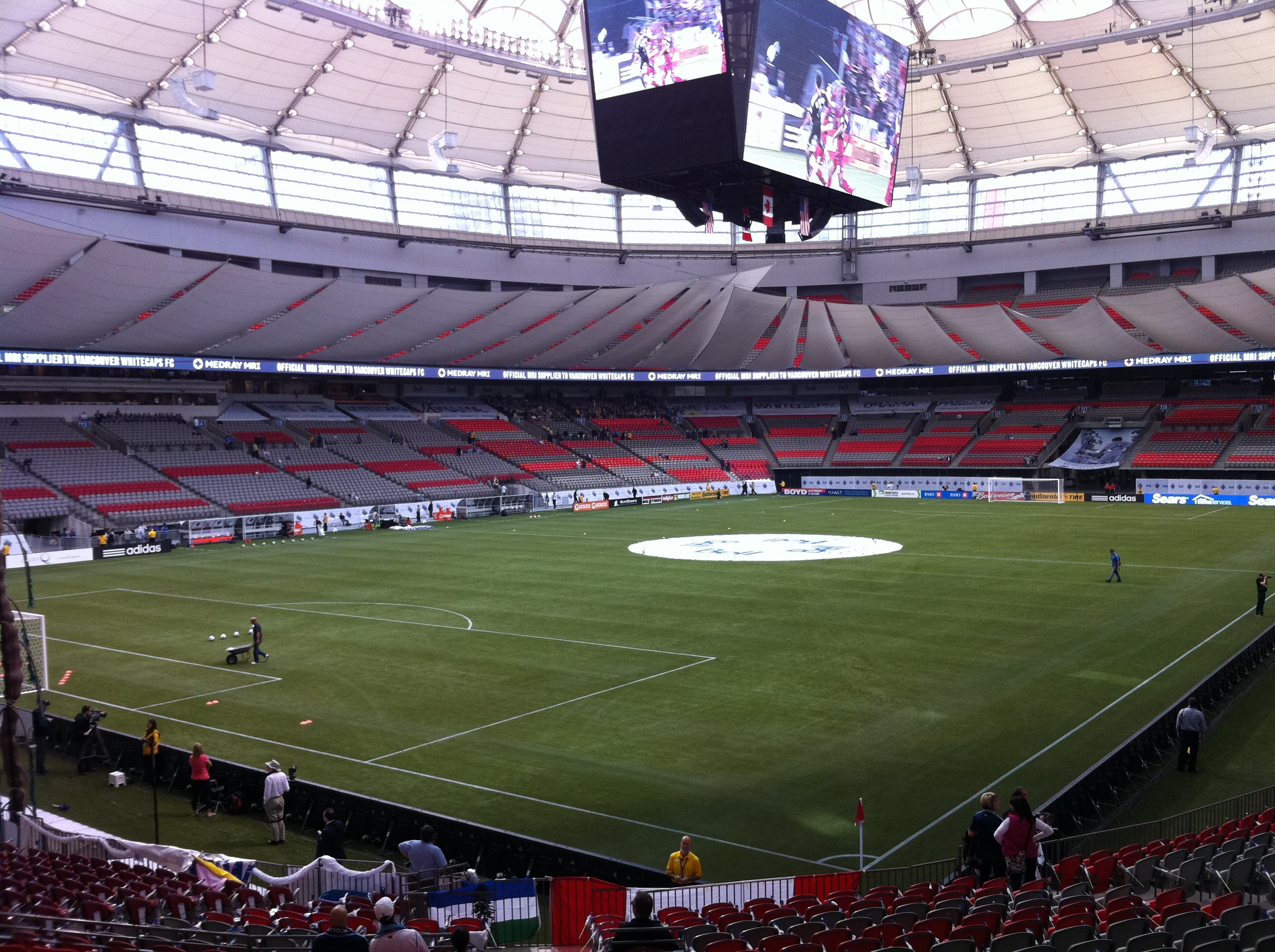
Vancouver Whitecaps FC debut at BC Place on October 2 against Cascadia rivals and expansion cousins, Portland Timbers.

The Whitecaps have had a long-standing rivalry with the Pacific Northwest clubs Seattle Sounders FC and Portland Timbers, dating back to the 1970s when ancestry clubs of the same name played in the original and now-defunct North American Soccer League. The tri-member tournament will continue in 2012.

The winner is determined through league matches between the sides, and the club with the best record against both sides wins the trophy. The 2012 MLS season will see an unbalanced schedule due to an uneven number of teams with the addition of the Montreal Impact. As a result, the Whitecaps will play three matches each against Portland and Seattle. The odd number of matches means Vancouver will host the Sounders twice and Timbers once while visiting Seattle Portland once and twice respectively. This setup will alternate each year.

Pos	Team	GP	W	L	D	GF	GA	GD	Pts
1	Portland Timbers	6	3	1	2	7	7	0	11
2	Seattle Sounders FC	6	2	1	3	9	5	+4	9
3	Vancouver Whitecaps FC	6	0	3	3	4	8	-4	3

== Recognition ==
=== MLS Save of the Week ===
Week	Player	Save	Report
2	USA Joe Cannon	32'	SOTW
3	USA Joe Cannon	67'	SOTW

=== MLS Team of the Week ===
Week	Player/Manager	Position	Report
7	(South Korea) Lee Young-Pyo	DF	MLS Team of the Week: 7
8	(South Korea) Lee Young-Pyo	DF	MLS Team of the Week: 8
11	(Switzerland) Alain Rochat	DF	MLS Team of the Week: 11
12	(United States) John Thorrington	MF	MLS Team of the Week: 12
13–15	(Jamaica) Darren Mattocks	FW	MLS Team of the Week: 13–15
13–15	(France) Sébastien Le Toux	FW	MLS Team of the Week: 13–15
13–15	(Scotland) Martin Rennie	Coach	MLS Team of the Week: 13–15
18	(United States) Joe Cannon	GK	MLS Team of the Week: 18
23	(Brazil) Camilo	MF	MLS Team of the Week: 23

=== MLS All-Stars ===
Player	Position	Note
(United States) Jay DeMerit	DF	First XI

== Miscellany ==
=== Allocation ranking ===
Vancouver is in the No. 11 position in the MLS Allocation Ranking. The allocation ranking is the mechanism used to determine which MLS club has first priority to acquire a U.S. National Team player who signs with MLS after playing abroad, or a former MLS player who returns to the league after having gone to a club abroad for a transfer fee. A ranking can be traded, provided that part of the compensation received in return is another club's ranking.

Vancouver moved to the top position in the allocation ranking after the Montreal Impact exercised their allocation rights to acquire Eddie Johnson. On June 26, the Whitecaps swapped their allocation ranking with the Philadelphia Union, who were in the 12 position, in a trade. Philadelphia then used their allocation ranking to sign Bakary Soumaré.

=== International roster slots ===
Vancouver have 11 MLS International Roster Slots for use in the 2012 season. Each club in Major League Soccer is allocated 8 international roster spots. Vancouver acquired one additional slot from Colorado Rapids in November 2010 and a second slot from Colorado in January 2012. They acquired a third additional slot from Toronto FC in July 2012.

=== Future draft pick trades ===
Future picks acquired:

- 2013 MLS SuperDraft Round 1 pick from Philadelphia Union
- 2013 MLS SuperDraft conditional pick from Real Salt Lake
- 2013 MLS Supplemental Draft Round 1 pick from Chicago Fire
- 2014 MLS SuperDraft Round 1 pick from Toronto FC
- 2014 MLS SuperDraft Round 2 pick from Colorado Rapids
- 2014 MLS SuperDraft Round 3 pick from Seattle Sounders FC
- 2015 MLS SuperDraft Round 3 pick from D.C. United

Future picks traded:

- 2013 MLS SuperDraft Round 2 pick to Philadelphia Union
