= Martin Rennie (football manager) =

Scottish footballer and manager (born 1975)

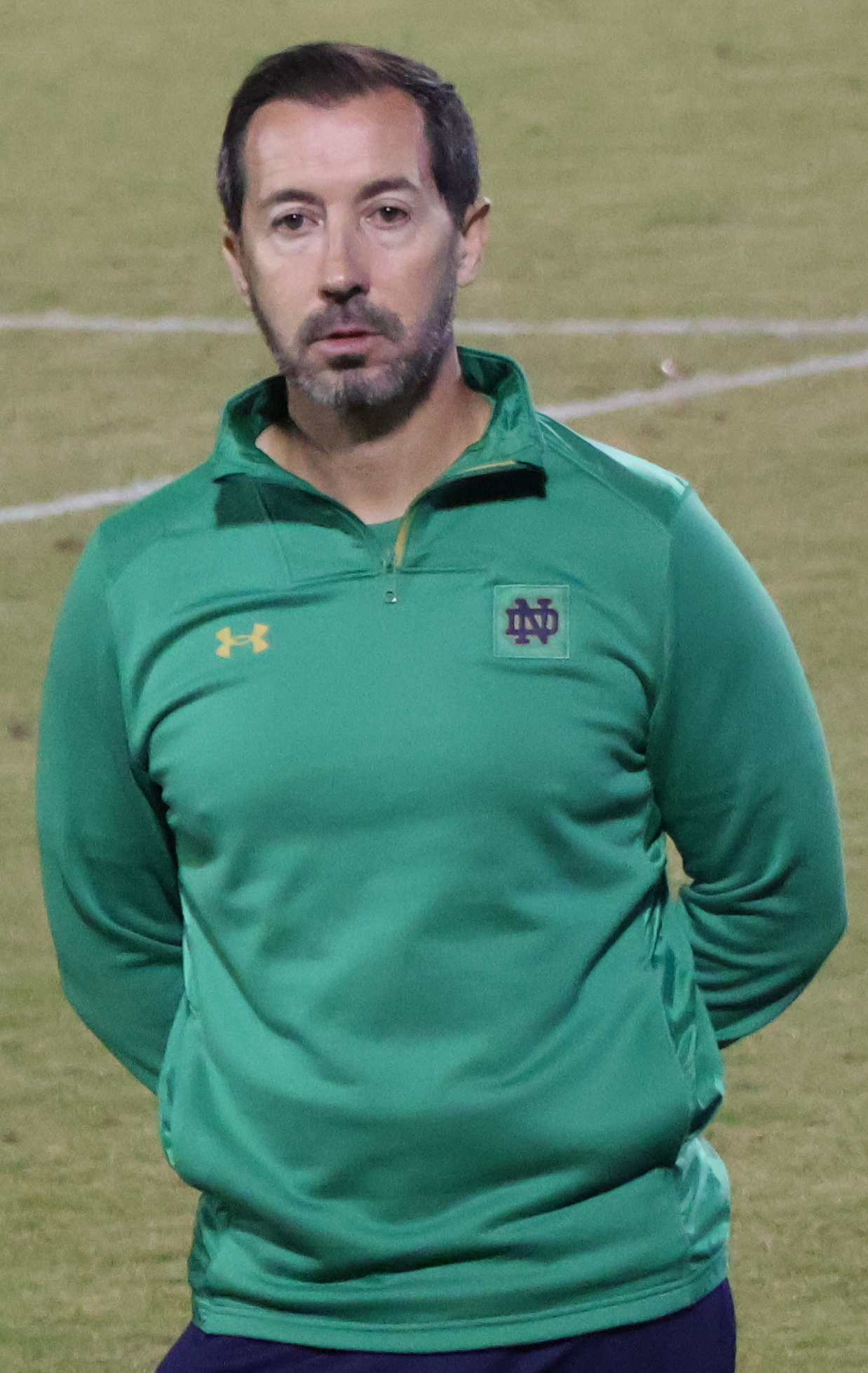
- Rennie with Notre Dame in 2024

Personal information
- Date of birth: 22 May 1975 (age 51)
- Place of birth: Thurso, Scotland

Youth career
- Years: Team
- Dunipace
- Bo'ness United

Managerial career
- 2005: Cascade Surge
- 2007–2008: Cleveland City Stars
- 2009–2011: Carolina RailHawks
- 2011–2013: Vancouver Whitecaps FC
- 2014–2016: Seoul E-Land
- 2018–2021: Indy Eleven
- 2021–2022: Falkirk
- 2021–: Notre Dame (assistant)

Martin Rennie (born 22 May 1975) is a Scottish football coach who is an assistant coach for the Notre Dame Fighting Irish women's soccer team.

== Early life ==
Born in Thurso, Scotland, to Fiona and Cliff Rennie on 22 May 1975, Martin Rennie spent the first 10 years of his life in Bettyhill, where his father was a Church of Scotland minister. In 1985, Rennie's father accepted a call to the Old Parish Church in Larbert, and the family moved there. Rennie was schooled at Ladeside Primary and Larbert High School. at weekends he would watch Falkirk F.C. play, later becoming a ballboy for the team.

Rennie went on to study for a business degree at Glasgow Caledonian University. In his final year, he received a tryout for the Charlotte Eagles but suffered a cruciate ligament injury to his right knee. Returning to Scotland, Rennie continued to play for Scottish Junior Football Association teams Dunipace and Bo'ness whilst working in sales and marketing for Blackbaud. With the money earned from his sales and marketing work, Rennie was able to personally pay for his SFA coaching course costs. Rennie quickly rose through the coaching ranks and attained his UEFA 'A' Licence, becoming assistant manager at Rosyth F.C. at 26.

In 2003, Rennie was asked by charity Ambassadors Football to embark on a playing tour of Africa, visiting Mozambique, Sudan and South Africa. The tour comprised players from United States-based teams Charlotte Eagles, Cascade Surge, and Minnesota Thunder, a South African international, a Nigerian international and several players from the UK. During the trip, Rennie was offered an opportunity to manage the Cascade Surge.

== Coaching career ==
=== Cascade Surge ===
Rennie took over as head coach with the Cascade Surge in Oregon in 2005. Under him, the Premier Development League team reached its best level of success during its existence between 1995 and 2009. In his only season in charge, Rennie led the Surge to the North West Division Title, West Coast Championship Final, US Open Cup Qualification and the Fair Play Award. Out of 16 games, the Surge won 12 games and drew 2. Following this success, Rennie had to return to his work with Blackbaud and began to make plans for full-time work with AIS. In 2006, Rennie accepted an invitation to become the director of AIS, as well as the head coach of both the USL-2 expansion team, the Cleveland City Stars and youth team Ambassadors FC (both owned by AIS).

=== Cleveland City Stars ===
In the club's first season, the City Stars lost only one regular-season game. Rennie won the coach of the year award in a season where the team conceded a USL record low of 13 goals. The team finished its first season as the runners-up in the USL Second Division.

The Cleveland City Stars won the 2008 United Soccer Leagues Championship with a 2–1 victory over the Charlotte Eagles in front of a sold-out crowd at Krenzler Stadium in Cleveland and live on a TV audience throughout the United States. Again, Rennie's work was recognized in the shape of the Coach of the Year award. Some of the top young players that Rennie had recruited and coached in 2007 were transferred to professional teams at a higher level before the 2008 season began. Once again, at the end of the 2008 season, some of the most talented players were recruited by MLS and European teams.

=== Carolina RailHawks ===
Rennie began to coach the Carolina RailHawks in USL 1. With the Carolina RailHawks, he inherited a team that had only made the playoffs once in the history of the Franchise and had never finished above eighth place in a regular season campaign. Rennie only kept 3 players from the previous RailHawks roster. He then completely changed the team culture and environment, introducing psychological, tactical and physical concepts that had never been implemented at this level before. In 2009, the team missed out on the regular season title by only 2 points, finishing runners up to Portland, who recorded one of the best regular season records in the 25-year history of the USL. Rennie was a finalist for the coach of the year award, and his team was recognized for the turnaround that had taken place in just one season.

In 2010, the RailHawks established themselves as arguably the premier team in US Soccer outside of the MLS. The RailHawks won the NASL title and continued their success into the postseason with a run to the Championship final. The team that had previously never scored a playoff goal. For the fourth year in a row, Rennie was recognized as a finalist for the Coach of the Year Award, a feat that had never been achieved before at this level of professional soccer. The RailHawks also broke franchise records for a single season, including conceding only 14 goals and scoring 54.

Rennie attributes much of his coaching success to the leadership and psychological lessons he learned during his career in the corporate world, as well as the support he has had from assistant coaches Brian Irvine and Paul Ritchie, both former Scotland national football team players.

=== Vancouver Whitecaps FC ===
On 9 August 2011, Rennie was announced as the new coach of Vancouver Whitecaps FC; however he did not assume that role until after the season was over, on 2 November 2011. At the end of the 2011 season, Rennie revamped his playing squad by introducing experienced imports from the Scottish and English football league systems — Kenny Miller, Barry Robson and Andy O'Brien — then, in his first season in charge, the Whitecaps reached the play-offs. In the process, Rennie became the first coach to lead a Canadian team to the MLS postseason.

In the 2013 season, Rennie continued to revamp the playing squad, reduced the age of the team and introduced young players like Kekuta Manneh to the Whitecaps lineup, as well as Premier League experience in former England U21 international Nigel Reo-Coker. The Whitecaps became known throughout the MLS for their attacking and entertaining style. On 29 October, with his side finishing 3 points short of making the play-offs, Rennie was fired from the Whitecaps after their most successful MLS season to date, where they finished on 48 points, 5 more than the previous season. The Whitecaps also won the 2013 Cascadia Cup and won more games than they lost for the first season in their history. Bob Lenarduzzi, president of the Whitecaps, cited inconsistent performances and tactics as well as a failure to win the Canadian Championship as reasons for his dismissal.

=== Seoul E-Land ===
On 17 July 2014, he was appointed as manager of the newly formed South Korean side Seoul E-Land FC, who were scheduled to join the K League Challenge in the 2015 season. On 11 September 2014, he officially joined Seoul E-Land FC.

Working primarily with young Korean players, Rennie gave 18 players their professional debut and led the team to the playoffs in their inaugural season. Rennie and Seoul E-Land parted ways on 15 June 2016.

=== Indy Eleven ===
On 16 January 2018, American club Indy Eleven announced Rennie as head coach ahead of their inaugural United Soccer League (USL) season. On 16 June 2021, Indy Eleven and Martin mutually agreed to part ways.

=== Falkirk ===
On 10 December 2021, Rennie would return to his native Scotland, being announced as the new manager for Scottish League One side Falkirk. Rennie left Falkirk in April 2022.

=== Managerial record ===
As of 16 April 2022

Managerial record by team and tenure
Team	From	To	Record					
Team	From	To	G	W	D	L	Win %	Ref.
Indy Eleven	January 2018	June 2021	99	45	19	35	45.45	
Falkirk	December 2021	April 2022	17	5	3	9	29.41	
Total			116	50	22	44	43.10	—

== Honours ==
Cascade Surge

- USL PDL Northwest Division: 2005

Cleveland City Stars

- USL Second Division: 2008

Carolina RailHawks

- North American Soccer League: 2011

Vancouver Whitecaps

- Cascadia Cup: 2013
