= 2011–12 Middlesbrough F.C. season =

Middlesbrough
2011–12 season
- Chairman: Steve Gibson
- Manager: Tony Mowbray
- Stadium: Riverside
- Championship: 7th
- FA Cup: Fourth round
- League Cup: Third round
- Top goalscorer: League: Marvin Emnes (14); All: Marvin Emnes (18)
- Highest home attendance: 27,794 (vs. Hull City, 26 December)
- Lowest home attendance: 14,336 (vs. Watford, 5 November)
- Average home league attendance: 17,221
Home colours	Away colours

The 2011–12 season was Middlesbrough's third consecutive season in the Championship. They also competed in the FA Cup and the League Cup.

== Results and fixtures ==
=== Pre-season ===
Win Draw Loss

Note: Results are given with Middlesbrough score listed first. Man of the Match is according to mfc.co.uk.

Game	Date	Venue	Opponent	Result F–A	Attendance	Middlesbrough goalscorers	Man of the match
1	14 July 2011	A	İstanbul BB	1–1	Unknown	Franks 86'	Coyne
2	17 July 2011	A	Varaždin	3–2	Unknown	Karlo 12' o.g., Lita 28', Bates 79'	Williams
3	19 July 2011	A	Antalyaspor	0–0	Unknown		Ripley
4	23 July 2011	A	Darlington	2–4	3,223	Lita 16', Kink 29'	Lita
5	26 July 2011	A	Carlisle United	0–2	2,218		Ripley
6	29 July 2011	H	PSV Eindhoven	2–3	20,151	McDonald 12', 38'	McMahon

=== Championship ===
==== League table ====
Pos	Team	Pld	W	D	L	GF	GA	GD	Pts	Promotion or relegation
5	Blackpool	46	20	15	11	79	59	+20	75	Qualification for Championship play-offs
6	Cardiff City	46	19	18	9	66	53	+13	75	Qualification for Championship play-offs
7	Middlesbrough	46	18	16	12	52	51	+1	70	
8	Hull City	46	19	11	16	47	44	+3	68	
9	Leicester City	46	18	12	16	66	55	+11	66	

Updated to match(es) played on 28 April 2012. Source: BBC Sport
Rules for classification: 1) points; 2) goal difference; 3) number of goals scored.

==== Results summary ====
Overall								Home						Away					
Pld	W	D	L	GF	GA	GD	Pts	W	D	L	GF	GA	GD	W	D	L	GF	GA	GD
46	18	16	12	52	51	+1	70	8	10	5	22	21	+1	10	6	7	30	30	0

==== Results by matchday ====
Round	1	2	3	4	5	6	7	8	9	10	11	12	13	14	15	16	17	18	19	20	21	22	23	24	25	26	27	28	29	30	31	32	33	34	35	36	37	38	39	40	41	42	43	44	45	46
Ground	H	A	A	H	H	A	A	H	H	A	H	A	H	A	A	H	H	A	H	A	H	A	H	H	A	H	A	A	H	H	A	H	A	H	H	A	A	H	A	A	H	A	A	H	H	A
Result	D	W	W	W	D	W	W	D	D	D	D	L	W	L	W	W	D	D	L	W	W	W	W	D	L	L	L	D	D	W	W	L	W	W	L	L	D	D	D	D	L	L	W	D	W	L
Position	9	6	2	3	4	3	1	2	2	2	3	3	2	4	3	3	3	4	4	3	4	3	3	2	4	4	4	5	6	8	6	8	5	4	4	6	5	5	5	7	8	8	7	7	7	7

A = Away; H = Home; W = Win; D = Draw; L = Loss

==== Matches ====
6 August 2011 1	Middlesbrough	2–2	Portsmouth	Riverside Stadium
15:00 GMT	Emnes 24'; Williams 54'	Report	Norris 47'; Varney 90+2'	Attendance: 18,196 (597 Portsmouth)

13 August 2011 2	Leeds United	0–1	Middlesbrough	Elland Road
15:00 GMT		Report	Emnes 67'	Attendance: 25,650 (2,237 Boro)

16 August 2011 3	Barnsley	1–3	Middlesbrough	Oakwell
19:45 GMT	McManus 4' (o.g.)	Report	McDonald 11'; Robson 13'; Emnes 44'	Attendance: 10,603 (1,879 Boro)

21 August 2011 4	Middlesbrough	3–1	Birmingham City	Riverside Stadium
15:00 GMT	Robson 48'; Haroun 69'; Martin 72'	Report	Rooney 36' (pen.)	Attendance: 17,567 (591 Birmingham)

27 August 2011 5	Middlesbrough	1–1	Coventry City	Riverside Stadium
15:00 GMT	Emnes 21'	Report	Jutkiewicz 72'	Attendance: 17,432 (295 Coventry)

10 September 2011 6	Burnley	0–2	Middlesbrough	Turf Moor
15:00 GMT		Report	Bailey 10'; Bennett 49'	Attendance: 15,220 (2,091 Boro)

17 September 2011 7	Crystal Palace	0–1	Middlesbrough	Selhurst Park
15:00 GMT		Report	Emnes 65'	Attendance: 15,198 (1,595 Boro)

24 September 2011 8	Middlesbrough	0–0	Ipswich Town	Riverside Stadium
15:00 GMT		Report		Attendance: 17,741 (434 Ipswich)

28 September 2011 9	Middlesbrough	0–0	Leicester City	Riverside Stadium
19:45 GMT		Report		Attendance: 16,883 (615 Leicester)

1 October 2011 10	Reading	0–0	Middlesbrough	Madjeski Stadium
15:00 GMT		Report		Attendance: 17,418 (1,435 Boro)

15 October 2011 11	Middlesbrough	1–1	Millwall	Riverside Stadium
15:00 GMT	Robson 24'	Report	Trotter 55'	Attendance: 16,669 (270 Millwall)

18 October 2011 12	Nottingham Forest	2–0	Middlesbrough	City Ground
19:45 GMT	Tudgay 35'; McGugan 55'	Report		Attendance: 20,630 (1,344 Boro)

22 October 2011 13	Middlesbrough	2–0	Derby County	Riverside Stadium
15:00 GMT	R. Williams 44'; Emnes 51'	Report		Attendance: 17,407 (931 Derby)

29 October 2011 14	Southampton	3–0	Middlesbrough	St. Mary's Stadium
15:00 GMT	Do Prado 15', 29'; Connolly 79'	Report		Attendance: 26,630 (1,644 Boro)

1 November 2011 15	Doncaster Rovers	1–3	Middlesbrough	Keepmoat Stadium
19:45 GMT	Sharp 12'	Report	Robson 29', 64' (pen.); Emnes 45+2'	Attendance: 9,792 (2,273 Boro)

5 November 2011 16	Middlesbrough	1–0	Watford	Riverside Stadium
17:20 GMT	McDonald 41'	Report		Attendance: 14,366 (209 Watford)

19 November 2011 17	Middlesbrough	2–2	Blackpool	Riverside Stadium
15:00 GMT	McDonald 15', 73'	Report	Sylvestre 21'; Shelvey 78'	Attendance: 18,128 (1,292 Blackpool)

26 November 2011 18	Peterborough United	1–1	Middlesbrough	London Road Stadium
15:00 GMT	Taylor 81'	Report	Bates 54'	Attendance: 10,013

29 November 2011 19	Middlesbrough	0–2	West Ham United	Riverside Stadium
15:00 GMT		Report	Piquionne 9'; Cole 90'	Attendance: 18,457 (1,243 West Ham)

3 December 2011 20	Bristol City	0–1	Middlesbrough	Ashton Gate
17:20 GMT		Report	Martin 90'	Attendance: 14,467 (612 Boro)

10 December 2011 21	Middlesbrough	1–0	Brighton & Hove Albion	Riverside Stadium
15:00 GMT	McDonald 21'	Report		Attendance: 16,594 (679 Brighton)

17 December 2011 22	Cardiff City	2–3	Middlesbrough	Cardiff City Stadium
15:00 GMT	Turner 22'; Gunnarsson 43'	Report	Ogbeche 15'; McDonald 60'; Haroun 76'	Attendance: 23,373 (560 Boro)

26 December 2011 23	Middlesbrough	1–0	Hull City	Riverside Stadium
15:00 GMT	Robson 87'	Report		Attendance: 27,794 (2,704 Hull)

31 December 2011 24	Middlesbrough	1–1	Peterborough United	Riverside Stadium
15:00 GMT	McDonald 51'	Report	Rowe 86'	Attendance: 18,899 (343 Peterborough)

2 January 2012 25	Blackpool	3–0	Middlesbrough	Bloomfield Road
15:00 GMT	Phillips 49'; LuaLua 57'; Hines 70' (o.g.)	Report		Attendance: 13,499 (2,092 Boro)

14 January 2012 26	Middlesbrough	0–2	Burnley	Riverside Stadium
15:00 GMT		Report	Rodriguez 5'; Trippier 28'	Attendance: 17,001 (1,213 Burnley)

21 January 2012 27	Coventry City	3–1	Middlesbrough	Ricoh Arena
15:00 GMT	McSheffrey 36'; Nimely 57'; Bates 64' (o.g.)	Report	McDonald 66'	Attendance: 14,112 (1,541 Boro)

1 February 2012 28	Leicester City	2–2	Middlesbrough	King Power Stadium
19:45 GMT	Nugent 7'; Beckford 86'	Report	McDonald 17'; McMahon 79'	Attendance: 20,512 (551 Boro)

4 February 2012 29	Middlesbrough	0–0	Crystal Palace	Riverside Stadium
15:00 GMT		Report		Attendance: 15,725 (397 Crystal Palace)

14 February 2012 30	Middlesbrough	2–1	Nottingham Forest	Riverside Stadium
19:45 GMT	Emnes 45'; Jutkiewicz 46'	Report	Lynch 66'	Attendance: 14,799 (462 Nottingham Forest)

22 February 2012 31	Millwall	1–3	Middlesbrough	The Den
19:45 GMT	Henderson 43'	Report	Emnes 15', 38'; Main 86'	Attendance: 9,286 (547 Boro)

25 February 2012 32	Middlesbrough	0–2	Reading	Riverside Stadium
15:00 GMT		Report	Hunt 17'; Harte 80'	Attendance: 17,314 (271 Reading)

3 March 2012 33	Portsmouth	1–3	Middlesbrough	Fratton Park
15:00 GMT	Halford 65' (pen.)	Report	Robson 55' (pen.); Bates 62'; Emnes 82'	Attendance: 16,770 (836 Boro)

7 March 2012 34	Middlesbrough	2–0	Barnsley	Riverside Stadium
19:45 GMT	Hines 60'; Ogbeche 90+3'	Report		Attendance: 14,745 (330 Barnsley)

11 March 2012 35	Middlesbrough	0–2	Leeds United	Riverside Stadium
12:15 GMT		Report	Snodgrass 18'; Becchio 27'	Attendance: 21,301 (2,914 Leeds)

17 March 2012 36	Birmingham City	3–0	Middlesbrough	St Andrew's
15:00 GMT	Žigić 11'; King 57'; Fahey 59'	Report		Attendance: 19,927 (1,085 Boro)

20 March 2012 37	West Ham United	1–1	Middlesbrough	Upton Park
19:45 GMT	Faye 68'	Report	Ogbeche 84'	Attendance: 27,250

25 March 2012 38	Middlesbrough	1–1	Bristol City	Riverside Stadium
15:00 GMT	Martin 56'	Report	Eprahim 13'	Attendance: 15,725

27 March 2012 39	Ipswich Town	1–1	Middlesbrough	Portman Road
19:45 GMT	Leadbitter 74'	Report	Jutkiewicz 63'	Attendance: 18,727 (493 Boro)

31 March 2012 40	Brighton & Hove Albion	1–1	Middlesbrough	Falmer Stadium
15:00 GMT	Calderón 72'	Report	Emnes 61'	Attendance: 20,553 (2,072 Boro)

7 April 2012 41	Middlesbrough	0–2	Cardiff City	Riverside Stadium
15:00 GMT		Report	Turner 11'; Mason 18'	Attendance: 17,564

9 April 2012 42	Hull City	2–1	Middlesbrough	KC Stadium
15:00 GMT	King 57'; Fryatt 88'	Report	Emnes 12'	Attendance: 19,613 (2,850 Boro)

14 April 2012 43	Derby County	0–1	Middlesbrough	Pride Park
15:00 GMT		Report	Main 80'	Attendance: 24,654 (1,200 Boro)

17 April 2012 44	Middlesbrough	0–0	Doncaster Rovers	Riverside Stadium
19:45 GMT		Report		Attendance: 14,967

21 April 2012 45	Middlesbrough	2–1	Southampton	Riverside Stadium
17:20 GMT	Bailey 45+1'; Zemmama 77'	Report	Sharp 1'	Attendance: 19.007

28 April 2012 46	Watford	2–1	Middlesbrough	Vicarage Road
12:30 GMT	Iwelumo 68'; Deeney 88'	Report	Emnes 84'	Attendance: 14,022 (2,020 Boro)

=== FA Cup ===
7 January 2012 Third round	Middlesbrough	1–0	Shrewsbury Town	Riverside Stadium
15:00 GMT	Emnes 41'	Report		Attendance: 12,631 (917 Shrewsbury); Referee: Tony Bates

29 January 2012 Fourth round	Sunderland	1–1	Middlesbrough	Stadium of Light
1:30 GMT	Campbell 58'	Report	Robson 16'	Attendance: 33,347 (3,000 Boro); Referee: Kevin Friend

8 February 2012 Fourth round replay	Middlesbrough	1–2 (a.e.t.)	Sunderland	Riverside Stadium
19:45 GMT	Jutkiewicz 57'	Report	Colback 41'; Sessègnon 113'	Attendance: 26,707 (4,253 Sunderland); Referee: Anthony Taylor

=== League Cup ===
9 August 2011 First round	Walsall	0–3	Middlesbrough	Bank's Stadium
19:45 GMT		Report	Emnes 17', 37', 52' (pen.)	Attendance: 3,564 (602 Boro); Referee: Darren Deadman

24 August 2011 Second round	Peterborough United	0–2	Middlesbrough	London Road Stadium
19:45 GMT		Report	Robson 3'; Hines 27'	Attendance: 5,012 (782 Boro); Referee: Philip Gibbs

20 September 2011 Third round	Crystal Palace	2–1	Middlesbrough	Selhurst Park
20:00 GMT	Zaha 17'; Andrew 52'	Report	Zemmama 54'	Attendance: 5,448 (606 Boro); Referee: Graham Scott

== Players ==
=== Captains ===
No.	P	Name	Country	No. games	Notes
4	DF	Matthew Bates	(England)	41	Club captain
17	MF	Barry Robson	(Scotland)	8	
29	DF	Tony McMahon	(England)	3	

Last updated: 17 August 2011
Source: Competitive match reports.
Competitive matches only
Matches started as captain only
Country: FIFA nationality; No.: Squad number; P: Position; Name: Player name; No. Games: Number of games started as captain.

=== First-team squad ===
As of 6 April 2012

No.	Pos	Nat	Player	Total		Championship		FA Cup		League Cup	
No.	Pos	Nat	Player	Apps	Goals	Apps	Goals	Apps	Goals	Apps	Goals
1	GK	(England) ENG	Jason Steele	36	0	34	0	2	0	0	0
2	DF	(England) ENG	Justin Hoyte	44	0	39	0	3	0	2	0
3	DF	(England) ENG	Joe Bennett	45	1	40+1	1	2	0	2	0
4	DF	(England) ENG	Matthew Bates	42	2	37	2	3	0	1+1	0
5	MF	(Morocco) MAR	Merouane Zemmama	17	2	7+8	1	0	0	2	1
6	DF	(Scotland) SCO	Stephen McManus	27	0	21+3	0	0	0	3	0
7	FW	(Australia) AUS	Scott McDonald	36	9	31+2	9	2	0	1	0
8	MF	(Scotland) SCO	Kevin Thomson	29	0	14+12	0	2	0	1	0
9	FW	(Netherlands) NED	Marvin Emnes	48	18	37+5	14	2+1	1	2+1	3
10	MF	(England) ENG	Nicky Bailey	39	2	37	2	0	0	2	0
11	FW	(England) ENG	Adam Hammill	10	0	8+2	0	0	0	0	0
14	MF	(Australia) AUS	Rhys Williams	40	2	34+1	2	3	0	1+1	0
15	DF	(England) ENG	Seb Hines	27	2	20+3	1	2	0	2	1
16	FW	(Nigeria) NGR	Bartholomew Ogbeche	18	3	5+12	3	1	0	0	0
17	MF	(Scotland) SCO	Barry Robson	39	9	37+0	7	1	1	1	1
18	MF	(Argentina) ARG	Julio Arca	33	0	22+8	0	1	0	1+1	0
19	MF	(Scotland) SCO	Andy Halliday	1	0	0+1	0	0	0	0	0
20	FW	(England) ENG	Luke Williams	1	0	0	0	0	0	0+1	0
21	GK	(Wales) WAL	Danny Coyne	6	0	1	0	1+1	0	3	0
22	MF	(France) FRA	Malaury Martin	18	3	0+15	3	1	0	2	0
24	MF	(Scotland) SCO	Cameron Park	1	0	0	0	0	0	0+1	0
25	FW	(England) ENG	Curtis Main	13	2	0+12	2	1	0	0	0
29	DF	(England) ENG	Tony McMahon	39	1	28+6	1	2	0	3	0
30	FW	(England) ENG	Lukas Jutkiewicz	21	3	17+2	2	2	1	0	0
31	GK	(England) ENG	Connor Ripley	2	0	1	0	0+1	0	0	0
33	MF	(England) ENG	Richard Smallwood	19	0	7+7	0	1+1	0	2+1	0
35	DF	(England) ENG	Bruno Pilatos	0	0	0	0	0	0	0	0
38	MF	(Belgium) BEL	Faris Haroun	35	2	23+9	2	1	0	1+1	0
40	DF	(England) ENG	Paul Weldon	0	0	0	0	0	0	0	0
41	DF	(England) ENG	Adam Reach	2	0	0+1	0	0+1	0	0	0
Players featured for club who have been sent out on loan:
Players featured for club who have left:
	GK	(Nigeria) NGR	Carl Ikeme	10	0	10	0	0	0	0	0
	FW	(Scotland) SCO	Lee Miller	1	0	0	0	0	0	0+1	0
	FW	(England) ENG	Alex Nimely	10	0	0+9	0	0	0	1	0
	FW	(Estonia) EST	Tarmo Kink	2	0	0+1	0	0+1	0	0	0

=== Disciplinary record ===
Name	Number	Position	Championship		FA Cup		League Cup		Total	
Name	Number	Position	Yellow card	Red card	Yellow card	Red card	Yellow card	Red card	Yellow card	Red card
(Scotland) Barry Robson	17	MF	13	1	0	0	0	0	13	1
(England) Joe Bennett	3	DF	9	1	0	0	1	0	10	1
(England) Tony McMahon	29	DF	7	1	0	0	1	0	8	1
(England) Nicky Bailey	10	MF	8	0	0	0	0	0	8	0
(Australia) Rhys Williams	14	MF	6	1	1	0	0	0	7	0
(Belgium) Faris Haroun	38	MF	6	0	0	0	0	0	6	0
(Scotland) Kevin Thomson	8	MF	3	2	1	0	0	0	4	2
(Scotland) Stephen McManus	6	DF	4	0	0	0	0	0	4	0
(Australia) Scott McDonald	7	FW	3	0	0	0	0	0	3	0
(Argentina) Julio Arca	18	MF	3	1	0	0	1	0	4	1
(England) Matthew Bates	4	DF	2	0	0	0	0	0	2	0
(England) Seb Hines	2	DF	3	0	0	0	0	0	3	0
(Nigeria) Bartholomew Ogbeche	16	FW	2	0	0	0	0	0	2	0
(France) Malaury Martin	22	MF	1	0	0	0	0	0	1	0
(Netherlands) Marvin Emnes	9	FW	1	0	0	0	0	0	1	0
(England) Justin Hoyte	2	DF	1	0	1	0	0	0	2	0
(England) Curtis Main	2	FW	1	0	0	0	0	0	1	0
(England) Richard Smallwood	33	MF	1	0	0	0	0	0	1	0
(England) Lukas Jutkiewicz	30	FW	1	0	0	0	0	0	1	0
(Morocco) Merouane Zemmama	5	MF	1	0	0	0	0	0	1	0
(Nigeria) Carl Ikeme	13	GK	1	0	0	0	0	0	1	0
TOTALS			77	7	3	0	3	0	83	7

==== Suspensions served ====
Date	Matches Missed	Player	Reason	Opponents Missed
14 August	1	Tony McMahon	Red card	Barnlsey (A)
18 September	1	Joe Bennett	Red card	Crystal Palace (CC)
30 October	1	Barry Robson	5x (yellow card)	Derby County (H)
17 December	1	Tony McMahon	5x (yellow card)	Cardiff City (A)
7 January	2	Barry Robson	10x (yellow card)	Shrewsbury Town (FA), Burnley (H)
22 January	1	Kevin Thomson	Red card	Sunderland (FA)
22 January	1	Julio Arca	Red card	Sunderland (FA)
14 February	1	Kevin Thomson	Red card	Millwall (A)
4 March	1	R.Williams	Red card	Barnsley (H)
12 January	3	Barry Robson	Red card	Birmingham (A), West Ham (A), Bristol City (H)
8 April	2	Joe Bennett	10x (yellow card)	Hull City (A), Derby County (A)

Key: (H) = League Home, (A) = League Away, (FA) = FA Cup, (CC) = League Cup

=== Top scorers ===
Name	Championship	FA Cup	League Cup	Total
(Netherlands) Marvin Emnes	14	1	3	18
(Scotland) Barry Robson	7	1	1	9
(Australia) Scott McDonald	9	0	0	9
(Nigeria) Bartholomew Ogbeche	3	0	0	3
(France) Malaury Martin	3	0	0	3
(England) Lukas Jutkiewicz	2	1	0	3
(England) Curtis Main	2	0	0	2
(Australia) Rhys Williams	2	0	0	2
(Belgium) Faris Haroun	2	0	0	2
(England) Matthew Bates	2	0	0	2
(England) Nicky Bailey	2	0	0	2
(Morocco) Merouane Zemmama	1	0	1	2
(England) Joe Bennett	1	0	0	1
(England) Tony McMahon	1	0	0	1
(England) Seb Hines	1	0	1	2
Total	52	3	6	61

==== Penalties ====
Date	Penalty Taker	Scored	Opponent	Competition
9 August	Marvin Emnes	Yes	Walsall	League Cup
1 November	Barry Robson	Yes	Doncaster Rovers	Championship
3 March	Barry Robson	Yes	Portsmouth	Championship

==== Assists ====
Name	Championship	FA Cup	League Cup	Total
(Scotland) Barry Robson	9	0	0	9
(England) Justin Hoyte	5	0	1	6
(Australia) Scott McDonald	4	0	0	4
(England) Tony McMahon	3	0	1	4
(Australia) Rhys Williams	4	0	0	4
(England) Joe Bennett	2	0	1	3
(Argentina) Julio Arca	2	0	0	2
(Belgium) Faris Haroun	1	0	0	1
(England) Nicky Bailey	1	0	0	1
(Netherlands) Marvin Emnes	3	0	0	3
(England) Curtis Main	1	1	0	2
(France) Malaury Martin	0	1	0	1
(England) Seb Hines	1	0	0	1
(England) Lukas Jutkiewicz	2	0	0	2

=== Contracts ===
No.	Pos.	Nat.	Name	Age	Status	Contract length	Expiry date	Source
9	FW	(Netherlands)	Emnes	23	Signed	3 years	July 2015	MFC
33	MF	(England)	Smallwood	20	Signed	2 years	July 2014	MFC
14	MF	(Australia)	R.Williams	23	Signed	4.5 years	July 2016	MFC

== Transfers ==
=== In ===
Date	Player	From	Fee
	(England) Curtis Main	Free Agent	Free
18 July 2011	(France) Malaury Martin	Free Agent	Free
	(Argentina) Julio Arca	Free Agent	Free
	(Belgium) Faris Haroun	Free Agent	Free
	(Nigeria) Bartholomew Ogbeche	Free Agent	Free

=== Loans in ===
Date	Player	From	Duration
	(Nigeria) Carl Ikeme	Wolverhampton Wanderers	Three months
	(England) Alex Nimely	Manchester City	Three months
1 March 2012	(England) Adam Hammill	Wolverhampton	Until end of season

=== Out ===
Date	Player	To	Fee
30 June 2011	(Republic of Ireland) Willo Flood	(Scotland) Dundee United	Released
30 June 2011	(Germany) Maximilian Haas	Free agent	Released
	(England) Andrew Taylor	(Wales) Cardiff City	Free
	(Scotland) Kris Boyd	(Turkey) Eskişehirspor	Free
	(France) Didier Digard	(France) Nice	Undisclosed
	(England) Leroy Lita	(Wales) Swansea City	£1.75m
	(Scotland) Lee Miller	(England) Carlisle United	Free
	(Estonia) Tarmo Kink	Free agent	Released

=== Loans out ===
Date	Player	To	Duration
	(England) Ben Gibson	(England) Plymouth Argyle	Three months
	(Scotland) Cameron Park	(England) Barnsley	Three months
	(England) Jonathan Grounds	(England) Chesterfield	One month
31 August 2011	(England) Jonathan Franks	(England) Oxford United	Until 1 January
	(Scotland) Andy Halliday	(England) Walsall	Two months
	(England) Adam Reach	(England) Darlington	One month
	(England) Ben Gibson	(England) York City	Until end of season
	(Scotland) Stephen McManus	(England) Bristol City	Until end of season
22 February 2012	(England) Jonathan Franks	(England) Yeovil	Until end of season
22 February 2012	(England) Jonathan Grounds	(England) Yeovil	Until end of season

== Honours ==
Individual

- Football League Championship Manager of the Month:
  - September – Tony Mowbray (Won)
  - December – Tony Mowbray (Won)
- Football League Championship Player of the Month:
  - August – Marvin Emnes (Won)
  - September – Matthew Bates (Won)
  - December – Nicky Bailey (Nominated)
- Middlesbrough Official Supporters Club Player of the Year:
  - Barry Robson
- Middlesbrough Official Supporters Club Young Player of the Year:
  - Jason Steele

Team of the Week
Date	Player(s)
20/21 August	Barry Robson
27/28 August	Tony McMahon
10/11 September	Joe Bennett
17 September	Matthew Bates, Marvin Emnes
1/2 October	Stephen McManus
22/23 October	Rhys Williams
5/6 November	Barry Robson
10/11 December	Joe Bennett
17/18 December	Bartholomew Ogbeche
