= Barry Robson =

Scottish footballer (born 1978)

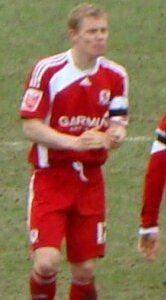
- Robson in 2010

Personal information
- Full name: Barry Gordon George Robson
- Date of birth: 7 November 1978 (age 48)
- Place of birth: Inverurie, Scotland
- Height: 1.80 m (5 ft 11 in)
- Position: Midfielder

Team information
- Current team: Cork City (manager)

Youth career
- 1995–1997: Rangers

Senior career*
Years	Team	Apps	(Gls)
1997–2003	Inverness Caledonian Thistle	135	(17)
1999–2000	→ Forfar Athletic (loan)	25	(9)
2003–2008	Dundee United	145	(32)
2008–2010	Celtic	42	(4)
2010–2012	Middlesbrough	87	(17)
2012	Vancouver Whitecaps FC	17	(3)
2013	Sheffield United	17	(2)
2013–2016	Aberdeen	60	(4)
Total		528	(88)

International career
2005–2007	Scotland B	2	(0)
2007–2012	Scotland	17	(0)

Managerial career
- 2022: Aberdeen (interim)
- 2023–2024: Aberdeen
- 2024–2025: Raith Rovers
- 2026–: Cork City
- * Club domestic league appearances and goals

Barry Gordon George Robson (born 7 November 1978) is a Scottish professional football manager and former player. Robson played as a midfielder for several clubs in Scotland, England and Canada and represented Scotland internationally. He is currently the manager of League of Ireland Premier Division club Cork City.

Robson began his career as a youth player with Rangers before spells with Inverness Caledonian Thistle, Dundee United and finally Celtic in his native Scotland. A move to England followed, where he spent two and a half years with Middlesbrough. Robson then moved to Canada to play for MLS side Vancouver Whitecaps FC before returning to England after one season to sign for Sheffield United. Robson then returned to Scotland, joining Aberdeen in summer 2013. He retired from professional football in 2016 after three seasons there.

After retiring as player, Robson took a coaching position with Aberdeen. After a run of good results in his second stint as their interim manager, Robson became Aberdeen manager in 2023. He was sacked a year later.

Robson appeared 17 times for Scotland between 2007 and 2012.

== Club career ==
=== Early career ===
Robson began his professional career with Rangers, but failed to break through to the first team. During his time at Ibrox he was given the nickname 'Baby Oleg' by teammates who perceived a resemblance to the club's Ukrainian defender Oleh Kuznetsov. In October 1997, he signed for Inverness Caledonian Thistle, and although not always a first team regular in his early Inverness career, helped them win promotion from the Second Division in 1999. Robson spent most of the 1999–2000 season on loan at Forfar Athletic, but thereafter returned to establish himself in the Inverness line-up.

=== Dundee United ===
Dundee United submitted a bid for Robson in May 2003 and he signed ten days later for a fee of between £50,000 and £100,000. Despite being sent off on his United début, he became a regular in the team. Robson missed only two matches throughout the 2004–05 season, finishing as United's second top scorer with nine goals, and signed a new three-year contract at the end of the season. Robson scored the goal that ensured United's survival in the SPL in the final game of the season against his old club Inverness CT. He also featured in the season's Scottish Cup Final which Dundee United lost 1–0 to Celtic.

Robson started the 2006–07 season as United captain and scored against Falkirk on the opening day of the season. He made his 100th league appearance for United in the game against St Mirren in late August, scoring twice in a 3–1 win but also being sent off late in the match. In February 2007, Robson signed a new contract until 2011, with his first career hat-trick following in March in a 4–0 away win against Hearts. With 11 goals by mid-March, Robson finished the season as the league's top-scoring midfielder, four ahead of Rangers' Charlie Adam.

The following season, Robson managed an even better ratio, scoring 12 from 24 games in all competitions at the point of leaving United. With 11 league goals, Robson was second top scorer in the league, one ahead of colleague Noel Hunt. Six of his goals came in January 2008, including a second hat-trick against Hearts in less than a year.

=== Celtic ===
On the final morning of the January 2008 transfer window, Robson was in negotiations to move to Celtic after they had a "seven figure" bid, plus Celtic player Jim O'Brien on loan until the end of the season, accepted by United. He signed for Celtic that evening.

Robson made his Celtic debut on 10 February against Aberdeen, scoring with his first touch of the ball, a free-kick into the bottom corner of the goal. He scored his second goal for Celtic on his Champions League debut against Barcelona. An assist from Aiden McGeady allowed Robson to loop a header over Víctor Valdés, to put Celtic ahead, though they eventually lost 3–2. On 27 April, Robson scored his first Old Firm goal, converting a penalty which was the winning goal. On 10 August, Robson again scored from a penalty kick, this time against St Mirren, the opening goal of Celtic's league campaign for the 2008–09 season, in a 1–0 victory for Celtic. Robson's final game for Celtic was against Old Firm rivals Rangers.

=== Middlesbrough ===
Robson left Celtic in January 2010 and joined his former Celtic manager Gordon Strachan at Middlesbrough along with teammates Willo Flood, Scott McDonald and Chris Killen. He was sent off on his home debut against Bristol City. He captained Middlesbrough against Peterborough United standing in for injured Gary O'Neil, and scored his first goal for the club in the seventh minute. His form continued as he scored two penalties against QPR on 27 February at the Riverside. He scored again in the Tyne-Tees derby against Newcastle on 13 March. Three days later he scored against Derby County at Pride Park.

Robson scored the quickest ever goal at the Riverside on 8 September 2010 against Reading, netting after just 24 seconds in a game which Middlesbrough went on to win 3–1.

Robson scored his first goal of the 2011–12 season in a 3–1 victory over Barnsley on 16 August 2011. On 21 August 2011, he scored the equaliser from a free kick in Middlesbrough's 3–1 win over Birmingham City. He followed this, three days later, by hitting his team's opener after four minutes in a 2–0 victory over Peterborough United in the second round of the League Cup. Robson's fine goal scoring form continued with a goal against Millwall and two against Doncaster to help extend Middlesbrough's strong start to the season. Robson scored a goal from 35 yards in the 87th minute, to give Middlesbrough a vital 1–0 home victory over Hull City on 26 December 2011. On 29 January 2012, Robson scored a left footed volley against Sunderland at the Stadium of Light. This forced an FA Cup fourth round replay at the Riverside Stadium. Following an injury to club captain Matthew Bates, Robson was giving the captain's armband until the end of his final season at the Riverside. In April, Robson was announced as the Player of the Year by the Middlesbrough Supporters' Club for the 2011–12 season. On 28 April 2012, Robson played in a 2–1 loss against Watford on the last day of the season, setting up Marvin Emnes for Boro's solitary goal. It was his final game for Middlesbrough.

=== Vancouver Whitecaps FC ===
In February 2012 Robson agreed to a three-year contract with the Vancouver Whitecaps FC as one of their two available Designated Players. Robson made his Whitecaps debut in a 1–0 away victory against the Colorado Rapids, and in his home debut, scored his first goal for the club in a 2–2 draw with Los Angeles Galaxy. Robson finished the season having played 18 times for Vancouver and scoring three goals. With the Whitecaps returning for pre-season training in January 2013, they announced they had mutually agreed to terminate Robson's contract to enable him to return to the UK, citing the inability of his family to settle in Canada.

=== Sheffield United ===
On the last day of January 2013 transfer window Robson returned to England, signing a short-term contract with Sheffield United for the remainder of the season, taking the vacant number 19 shirt. Robson made his debut for the Blades the following day, as a substitute in a 2–1 home defeat against Coventry City, providing an assist with his first touch of the ball in a Blades shirt, setting up Dave Kitson's goal from a corner kick. His first goal for the Blades came in his first start for the club, netting from the penalty spot in a 3–0 win over Colchester United a few weeks later. Robson played regularly for the remainder of the season but with the Blades failing to gain promotion they opted not to offer him a new deal when his contract expired. Robson left United having made eighteen appearances and scored two goals.

=== Aberdeen ===
In June 2013, Robson signed a pre-contract agreement with his home town club Aberdeen, and made his debut in their first game of the season, a 2–1 victory over Kilmarnock. Robson scored two goals to help Aberdeen beat Inverness CT in a thrilling 4–3 encounter during the festive period. Robson also netted for the dons with a penalty against Dundee United which leveled the game at 1–1 before Peter Pawlett netted in stoppage time to seal all three points for Aberdeen. Robson also found the net directly from a corner kick in a match against St Mirren which Aberdeen went on to win 2–0.

On 16 March 2014, Robson was in the Aberdeen side that beat Inverness Caledonian Thistle 4–2 on penalties to win the 2014 Scottish League Cup final. Robson was among the Aberdeen players to score during the shoot-out. He signed a new one-year contract with Aberdeen on 15 May 2014. Robson retired from professional football at the end of the 2015–16 season; he then took up a coaching position with Aberdeen.

== International career ==
Robson won a call-up to the Scotland B team for the first time in December 2005, alongside fellow Dundee United player Mark Kerr.

Robson played in the Scotland Future team in March 2006. In August 2007, Robson received his first full international call-up when selected for the friendly against South Africa, making his début as a second-half substitute. He was subsequently called up for the following squad in September 2007 for the double-header against Lithuania and France but failed to make an appearance.

In September 2008, Robson was credited with his first international goal in the 2010 World Cup qualifying victory against Iceland in unusual circumstances. After James McFadden's second-half penalty kick was saved, both players chased the rebound. Though it appeared that McFadden touched the ball over the line, the goal was officially awarded to Robson. The SFA lobbied on McFadden's behalf, and in March 2009 FIFA re-credited the goal to McFadden.

== Coaching career ==
=== Aberdeen ===
On 14 February 2022, Robson was appointed as caretaker manager of Aberdeen following the sacking of Stephen Glass, being temporarily promoted from his role with the U18s. Robson oversaw one match during his interim spell in charge, a 1–1 draw with St Johnstone, before the club made the permanent appointment of Jim Goodwin.

Robson was again put in caretaker charge of Aberdeen in January 2023, following the sacking of Jim Goodwin. Aberdeen confirmed on 29 March that Robson would continue as manager at least until the end of the 2022–23 season. Following a run of seven consecutive wins that pushed Aberdeen into third place in the 2022–23 Scottish Premiership, Robson signed a two-year contract to continue as manager on 1 May 2023.

On 31 January 2024, Robson was sacked by Aberdeen with the team sitting eighth in the 2023–24 Scottish Premiership.

=== Raith Rovers ===
On 29 December 2024 Robson was announced as the new manager of Scottish Championship side Raith Rovers on a two and a half year deal. Robson was Rovers' third manager of the season following the dismissal of Ian Murray just one league game in to the season and his replacement Neill Collins leaving for Sacramento Republic after 15 games in charge.

On 11 November 2025, Robson was sacked by Raith Rovers. Robson left the club after a run of four defeats in six matches, which put them in sixth place in the 2025–26 Scottish Championship.

=== Cork City ===
On 11 January 2026, Robson was announced as manager of recently relegated League of Ireland First Division club Cork City on a two-year-contract.

On 12 May 2026, a youthful Cork City side defeated Rockmount 2–1 in the final of the Munster Senior Cup to win the club's first silverware of the season. On 4 September 2026, following a 1–1 draw away to Bray Wanderers, his side were promoted back to the Premier Division after being crowned 2026 League of Ireland First Division champions with 6 games to spare.

On 29 October 2026, Robson signed a new two-year contract with the club.

== Career statistics ==
=== Club ===
Appearances and goals by club, season and competition
Club	Season	League			National Cup		League Cup		Other		Total	
Club	Season	Division	Apps	Goals	Apps	Goals	Apps	Goals	Apps	Goals	Apps	Goals
Inverness Caledonian Thistle	1997–98	Scottish Second Division	23	3	4	2	0	0	0	0	27	5
Inverness Caledonian Thistle	1998–99	Scottish Second Division	16	0	1	0	1	0	-		18	0
Inverness Caledonian Thistle	1999–2000	Scottish First Division	4	0	0	0	2	0	2	1	8	1
Inverness Caledonian Thistle	2000–01	Scottish First Division	24	2	2	1	1	0	2	0	29	3
Inverness Caledonian Thistle	2001–02	Scottish First Division	34	2	3	1	4	2	2	0	43	5
Inverness Caledonian Thistle	2002–03	Scottish First Division	34	10	4	3	3	0	1	0	42	13
Inverness Caledonian Thistle	Total		135	17	14	7	11	2	7	1	167	27
Forfar Athletic (loan)	1999–2000	Scottish Third Division	25	9	3	1	0	0	-		28	10
Dundee United	2003–04	Scottish Premier League	28	3	0	0	1	0	-		29	3
Dundee United	2004–05	Scottish Premier League	36	6	5	1	4	1	-		45	8
Dundee United	2005–06	Scottish Premier League	31	1	1	0	1	0	2	0	35	1
Dundee United	2006–07	Scottish Premier League	29	11	2	1	2	0	-		33	12
Dundee United	2007–08	Scottish Premier League	21	11	1	1	2	0	-		24	12
Dundee United	Total		145	32	9	3	10	1	2	0	166	36
Celtic	2007–08	Scottish Premier League	15	2	0	0	0	0	1	1	16	3
Celtic	2008–09	Scottish Premier League	17	1	1	0	1	0	5	1	24	2
Celtic	2009–10	Scottish Premier League	10	1	0	0	1	0	4	1	15	2
Celtic	Total		42	4	1	0	2	0	10	3	55	7
Middlesbrough	2009–10	Championship	18	5	0	0	0	0	-		18	5
Middlesbrough	2010–11	Championship	32	5	0	0	1	0	-		33	5
Middlesbrough	2011–12	Championship	37	7	1	1	1	1	-		39	9
Middlesbrough	Total		87	17	1	1	2	1	0	0	90	19
Vancouver Whitecaps FC	2012	Major League Soccer	17	3	0	0	0	0	1	0	18	3
Sheffield United	2012–13	League One	17	2	0	0	0	0	1	0	18	2
Aberdeen	2013–14	Scottish Premiership	28	4	4	0	3	0	-		35	4
Aberdeen	2014–15	Scottish Premiership	20	0	0	0	2	0	5	0	27	0
Aberdeen	2015–16	Scottish Premiership	12	0	0	0	0	0	2	0	14	0
Aberdeen	Total		60	4	4	0	5	0	7	0	76	4
Career total			528	88	32	12	30	4	28	4	618	108

=== International ===
Appearances and goals by national team and year
National team	Year	Apps	Goals
Scotland	2007	1	0
Scotland	2008	5	0
Scotland	2009	1	0
Scotland	2010	5	0
Scotland	2011	4	0
Scotland	2012	1	0
Total		17	0

=== Managerial statistics ===
As of match played 16 October 2026

Managerial record by team and tenure
Team	Nat	From	To	Record					Ref
Team	Nat	From	To	G	W	D	L	Win %	Ref
Aberdeen (caretaker)	(Scotland)	13 February 2022	19 February 2022	1	0	1	0	0.00	
Aberdeen	(Scotland)	29 January 2023	31 January 2024	49	20	11	18	40.82	
Raith Rovers	(Scotland)	29 December 2024	11 November 2025	38	16	8	14	42.11	
Cork City	(Republic of Ireland)	10 January 2026	Present	41	27	6	8	65.85	
Total				129	63	26	40	48.84	

- Initially caretaker in his second spell at Aberdeen; appointed until at least the end of the 2022–23 season on 29 March 2023 and on a two-year contract on 1 May 2023.

== Honours ==
=== Playing career ===
Celtic

- Scottish Premier League: 2007–08
- Scottish League Cup: 2008–09

Aberdeen

- Scottish League Cup: 2013–14

Individual

- Middlesbrough Player of the Year: 2011–12

=== Managerial career ===
Cork City

- League of Ireland First Division: 2026
- Munster Senior Cup: 2025–26
