= Martín Bonjour =

Argentine footballer

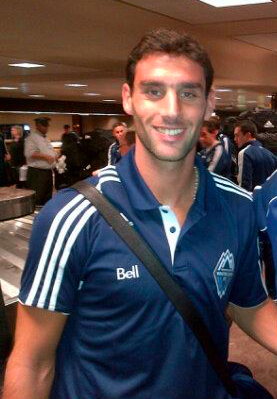
- Martín Bonjour in 2012

Personal information
- Full name: Fernando Martín Bonjour
- Date of birth: 4 September 1985 (age 41)
- Place of birth: Carhué, Argentina
- Height: 1.90 m (6 ft 3 in)
- Position: Centre-back

Senior career*
Years	Team	Apps	(Gls)
2003–2005	Olimpo	1	(0)
2004	→ Racing de Olavarría (loan)	13	(0)
2005–2008	Rentistas	34	(3)
2006	→ Lech Poznań (loan)	0	(0)
2008–2009	Universidad César Vallejo	24	(0)
2009–2012	Rampla Juniors	52	(5)
2011	→ Liverpool Montevideo (loan)	10	(1)
2012	Vancouver Whitecaps FC	28	(1)
2013–2014	Liverpool Montevideo	28	(1)
2014	Deportivo Quito	13	(1)
2014–2015	Once Caldas	15	(0)
2015	Deportivo Quito	12	(1)
2016	Guillermo Brown	17	(1)
2016	Aucas	7	(1)
2017–2018	Torque	31	(1)
2019	CD Olimpia	4	(0)
- * Club domestic league appearances and goals

Martín Bonjour (born 4 September 1985) is an Argentine former professional footballer who played as a centre-back.

== Career ==
Bonjour began his career in Argentina with Olimpo and made his debut in the first division during the 2003 season. He was sent on loan to Racing de Olavarría for the duration of the 2004 season. He moved to Uruguay in 2005 and joined Rentistas, appearing in 34 matches for Rentistas and scoring three goals. During the 2006 season he was sent on loan to Lech Poznań in Poland. At the conclusion of his contract with Rentistas, Bonjour joined Universidad César Vallejo in Peru. He enjoyed a solid season with César Vallejo before returning to Uruguay in 2009. This time the Argentine defender signed with Uruguayan Primera División side Rampla Juniors. While with Rampla Juniors Bonjour scored five goals in 52 appearances for the Montevideo club. During the Clausura portion of the 2010–11 season Bonjour was sent on loan to rivals Liverpool de Montevideo, where he scored one goal in 10 appearances.

On 6 January 2012, Bonjour was signed by Vancouver Whitecaps FC of Major League Soccer. He made his debut for the team on 3 March 2012 against the Montreal Impact. Bonjour was a starter on the team alongside Jay DeMerit, but lost his starting role to newcomer Andy O'Brien. Bonjour was waived by Vancouver Whitecaps on 25 January 2013.

On 4 January 2019, Bonjour joined Liga Nacional side Club Deportivo Olimpia in Honduras.
