= 2001–02 Inverness Caledonian Thistle F.C. season =

Scottish football club season

Inverness Caledonian Thistle F.C.
2001-02 season
- Manager: Steve Paterson
- Scottish First Division: 6th
- Scottish Cup: Quarter-final
- Scottish League Cup: Quarter-final
- Scottish Challenge Cup: 2nd Round
- Top goalscorer: League: All: Dennis Wyness (22)
- Highest home attendance: 5,037 vs. Partick Thistle, 5 March 2002
- Lowest home attendance: 876 vs. Forfar Athletic, 7 August 2001

Inverness Caledonian Thistle F.C. in their eighth season in the Scottish Football League competed in the Scottish First Division, Scottish League Cup, Scottish Challenge Cup and the Scottish Cup in season 2001–02.

== Results ==
=== Scottish First Division ===
Match Day	Date	Opponent	H/A	Score	ICT Scorer(s)	Attendance
1	4 August	Clyde	A	1-1	Mann	920
2	11 August	Falkirk	H	1–2	Mann	2,281
3	18 August	Partick Thistle	A	0–1		3,314
4	25 August	St Mirren	A	1–1	Mann	3,444
5	8 September	Arbroath	H	5–1	Wyness (3), Mann, McBain 70	1,505
6	15 September	Ross County	A	1–2	Robson	4,414
7	19 September	Raith Rovers	H	5–2	Wyness (4), Ritchie	984
8	22 September	Airdrieonians	A	0–6		1,197
9	29 September	Ayr United	H	3–1	Christie, Richie (2)	1,533
10	13 October	Clyde	H	5–1	Wyness (2), Ritchie, Bavidge, Duncan	1,653
11	20 October	Falkirk	A	2–1	Mann, Ritchie	2,075
12	27 October	Arbroath	A	2–3	Ritchie (2)	773
13	3 November	St Mirren	H	1–2	Wyness	2,343
14	10 November	Raith Rovers	A	5–1	Mann, Ritchie, Christie, Tokely, Robson	1,468
15	17 November	Ross County	H	3–0	McCormick (og), Wyness (2)	4,513
16	24 November	Ayr United	A	0–3		1,999
17	1 December	Airdrieonians	H	1–2	Ritchie	1,591
18	8 December	Partick Thistle	H	1–2	Wyness	1,926
19	15 December	Clyde	A	0–1		782
20	22 December	Arbroath	H	3–2	Ritchie, Wyness, Bavidge	1,173
21	29 December	St Mirren	A	0–0		4,089
22	12 January	Raith Rovers	H	5–0	Tokely, McBain, Bavidge, Mann, Bagan	1,822
23	19 January	Airdrieonians	A	0–3		1,506
24	2 February	Ayr United	H	1–1	Wyness	1,409
25	9 February	Partick Thistle	H	1–4	Ritchie	3,969
26	16 February	Falkirk	A	3–2	Munro, Wyness (2)	1,803
27	2 March	St Mirren	H	4–2	Bagan, Ritchie (3)	1,866
28	9 March	Arbroath	A	0–1		738
29	16 March	Ross County	A	0–0		1,590
30	19 March	Ross County	A	0–0		4,679
31	23 March	Ross County	H	1–1	Tokely	4,685
32	30 March	Airdrieonians	H	1–0	Bavidge	1,709
33	6 April	Ayr United	A	0–1		1,818
34	13 April	Clyde	H	1–1	MacDonald	1,525
35	20 April	Falkirk	A	0–0		1,965
36	27 April	Partick Thistle	H	3–0	Stewart, Ritchie, Wyness	2,506

==== Final League table ====
Pos	Team	Pld	W	D	L	GF	GA	GD	Pts
4	Ross County	36	14	10	12	51	43	+8	52
5	Clyde	36	13	10	13	51	56	−5	49
6	Inverness CT	36	13	9	14	60	51	+9	48
7	Arbroath	36	14	6	16	42	59	−17	48
8	St Mirren	36	11	12	13	43	53	−10	45

Source: "2001-2002 First Division - SPFL Archive". SPFL.
Rules for classification: 1) points; 2) goal difference; 3) number of goals scored.

=== Scottish League Cup ===
Round	Date	Opponent	H/A	Score	ICT Scorer(s)	Attendance
R1	11 September	Albion Rovers	A	2–0	Ritchie (2)	403
R2	26 September	Partick Thistle	H	3–3 (aet, ICT won 4–2 on penalties)	Teasdale, Robson (2)	1,034
R3	9 October	Dunfermline Athletic	A	1–1 (aet, ICT won 4–1 on penalties)	Bavidge	2,006
QF	28 November	Ayr United	A	1–5	Tokely	2,710

=== Scottish Challenge Cup ===
Round	Date	Opponent	H/A	Score	ICT Scorer(s)	Attendance
R1	7 August	Forfar Athletic	H	3–2	Christie, Bavidge, Ritchie	876
R2	14 August	Alloa Athletic	A	2–3	Ritchie, Wyness	394

=== Scottish Cup ===
Round	Date	Opponent	H/A	Score	ICT Scorer(s)	Attendance
R3	8 January	Arbroath	A	2–0	Robson, Ritchie	921
R4	26 January	Heart of Midlothian	A	3–1	Tokely, Wyness, Bagan	12,016
QF	23 February	Partick Thistle	A	2–2	Wyness (2)	8,700
QF R	5 March	Partick Thistle	H	0–1		5,037

== Hat-tricks ==
Player	Competition	Score	Opponent	Date
(Scotland) Dennis Wyness	Scottish First Division	5–1	Arbroath	8 September 2001
(Scotland) Dennis Wyness	Scottish First Division	5–2	Raith Rovers	19 September 2001
(Scotland) Paul Ritchie	Scottish First Division	4–2	St Mirren	2 March 2002
