= Tiago Ulisses =

Brazilian footballer

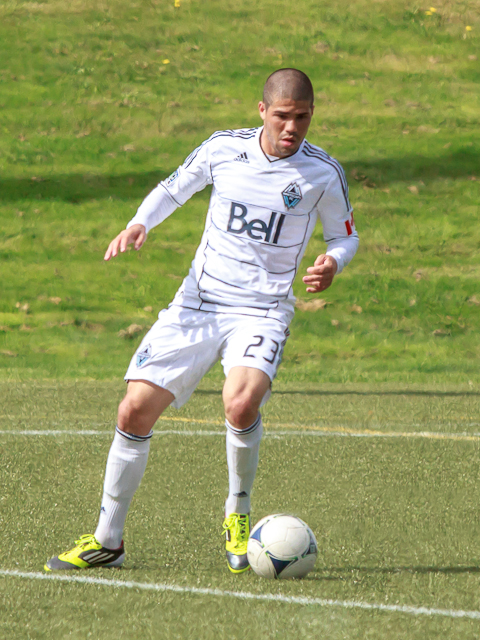
- Ulisses in 2012

Personal information
- Full name: Tiago Ulisses Aparecido Eugenio Sobral
- Date of birth: 9 May 1989 (age 37)
- Place of birth: São Paulo, Brazil
- Height: 5 ft 9 in (1.75 m)
- Position: Midfielder

Youth career
- 2001–2008: Corinthians

Senior career*
Years	Team	Apps	(Gls)
2009–2010	Corinthians	0	(0)
2009	→ Mineiros (loan)	0	(0)
2009	→ Capivariano (loan)	0	(0)
2010	→ Auto Esporte (loan)	0	(0)
2010	→ Nacional–SP (loan)	0	(0)
2011	Noroeste	11	(1)
2012	Botafogo	15	(0)
2012	Vancouver Whitecaps FC	0	(0)
2013	Guaratinguetá	16	(0)
2014	Almería B	2	(1)
2015	Caldense	0	(0)
2016	Santo André	0	(0)
2016	Nacional–AM	6	(1)
2017–	Santo André	0	(0)
- * Club domestic league appearances and goals as of 6 April 2017

Tiago Ulisses Aparecido Eugenio Sobral (born 9 May 1989) is a Brazilian professional footballer who plays as a midfielder- on the defensive midfield.

== Career ==
Born in São Paulo, Brazil, Ulisses spent seven years as an academy player with Corinthians from 2001 to 2008.

In 2011, Ulisses scored one goal in 11 appearances for Noroeste in the second-tier Campeonato Paulista Série A2 before moving to Botafogo, where he made 15 appearances in 2012.

Ulisses signed with Vancouver Whitecaps FC of Major League Soccer on 3 August 2012, and was released by the club without making a first team appearance three months later. After a one-year spell back to his home country with Guaratinguetá, Ulisses joined UD Almería B in Segunda División B.
