= 2014 Vancouver Whitecaps FC season =

Vancouver Whitecaps FC 2014 soccer season

Vancouver Whitecaps FC
2014 season
- Chairman: John Furlong
- Head coach: Carl Robinson
- Stadium: BC Place (Capacity 21,000)
- Major League Soccer: 5th West; 9th MLS
- Canadian Championship: Semi final
- Cascadia Cup: Winners
- Top goalscorer: League: Pedro Morales (8); All: Pedro Morales (9)
- Highest home attendance: 22,500 (capacity exceeded) vs. Sounders (Jul 5); 21,000 (sell-out) vs. Red Bulls (Mar 8) vs. Dynamo (Mar 29) vs. Rapids (Apr 5) vs. Galaxy (Apr 19) vs. Earthquakes (May 3) vs. Sounders (May 24) vs. Impact (Jun 25) vs. Dallas (Jul 27) vs. Timbers (Aug 30) vs. Rapids (Oct 25)
- Lowest home attendance: 17,183 vs. Earthquakes (Sept 10)
- Average home league attendance: League:20,800; All: 20,623
Home colours	Away colours

The 2014 Vancouver Whitecaps FC season was the Whitecaps' fourth season in Major League Soccer, the top tier of soccer in the United States and Canada.

== Season overview ==
=== December ===
December 11, Brad Knighton was traded to the New England Revolution for a conditional 2015 draft pick.

December 18, Corey Hertzog is claimed on re-entry waivers by Seattle Sounders FC.

Carl Robinson became the new head coach on December 16, 2013. Club president Bob Lenarduzzi stated that "there was no deliberate attempt" to "go Latin this season."

=== January ===
January 16, On the first day of the 2014 MLS SuperDraft the Vancouver Whitecaps selected Christian Dean with the 3rd overall pick and Andre Lewis with the 7th overall pick. In the 2nd round the Whitecaps selected Mamadou Diof with the 30th overall pick. After the draft it was revealed that Andre Lewis had signed a contract with the New York Cosmos of the NASL and will be on loan to MLS and Vancouver will own his MLS rights.

January 17, Camilo Sanvezzo is sold to Querétaro F.C. of Mexican Liga MX for a reported transfer fee of $2,500,000

January 21, 2014 MLS Superdraft rounds three to five where conducted on this day. Whitecaps drafter Michael Calderon with the 64th pick.

January 27, Whitecaps acquired Steven Beitashour from the San Jose Earthquakes and signed former San Jose player Mehdi Ballouchy to a contract that they claimed in the 2013 MLS Re-Entry Draft

=== February ===
February 5, Whitecaps announce that they have brought in forward Nicolás Mezquida and brought in Sebastián Fernández on loan from Boston River.

February 18, Whitecaps sign goalkeeper Paolo Tornaghi

February 26, Whitecaps acquire designated player Matias Laba from Toronto FC for future considerations rumoured to be $2,500,000. In another move the Whitecaps traded Daigo Kobayashi rights to the New England Revolution for a fourth round draft pick.

=== March ===
March 5, Whitecaps signed Pedro Morales on a free transfer from La Liga Malaga CF and made him a designated player joining Laba and Kenny Miller as DP's on the team. Also team favourite Matt Watson was traded to Chicago Fire for a 2014 international roster spot.

March 8, Whitecaps opened the season with a 4–1 victory over the NY Redbulls. Caps got a brace from Kenny Miller and goals from newcomers Sebastian Fernandez and Pedro Morales. With the victory the Whitecaps improved to 4–0 in season opening games since joining the MLS.

March 16, After going down 1–0 on an Erick Torres goal, Kekuta Manneh got the game tying goal in the 81st min to earn the Whitecaps a draw versus Chivas USA.

March 22, David Ousted earned his 1st clean sheet of the season with a 0–0 draw on the road versus the New England Revolution.

March 29, Jordan Harvey opened the scoring with his 1st goal of the season. Kenny Miller scored on a penalty kick to put the Whitecaps up 2–0 before settling for a 2–1 victory over Houston Dynamo.

Whitecaps finished March (two wins, two draws and no losses)

=== April ===
April 5, Darren Mattocks put the Whitecaps up 1–0 before Colorado Rapids got a brace from Jose Mari to give the Rapids a 2–1 victory.

April 12, Robbie Keane scored the lone goal to give the LA Galaxy a 1–0 victory.

April 19, Mattocks scored to tie the game 1–1. Down 2–1 after a Galaxy goal, Manneh earned the Whitecaps the 2–2 draw versus the LA Galaxy with a goal in the 86th minute.

April 26, After going down 2–0 in the opening 9 minutes the Whitecaps fought back to earn a 2–2 draw versus Real Salt Lake with goals in the 86th min by Nicolas Mezquida and the 94th min by Sebastian Fernandez.

Whitecaps finished April (no wins, two draws, and two losses)

=== May ===
May 3, Manneh opened the scoring to put the Whitecaps up 1–0. Whitecaps then got a brace by Morales with goals in the 19th and 20th min to give the Caps a 3–0 lead. Chris Wondolowski scored to in the 45th and 90th mins but it was not enough. Whitecaps held on for a 3–2 victory over San Jose Earthquakes.

May 4, Kenny Miller and the Whitecaps agree to a mutual contract termination effective immediately. Miller signs with the Rangers in Scotland after time with the club in the past.

May 7, after going down 2–0 versus Toronto FC, Manneh scored in the 92nd min to loss 2–1 in the 2014 Amway Canadian Championship first leg.

May 10, Ousted earned his 2nd clean sheet of the season with Erik Hurtado scoring the lone goal in the 1–0 victory over Columbus Crew.

May 14, going down 1–0 (3–1 agg) in the 4th minute, the Whitecaps fought back to a 3–3 agg score versus Toronto FC with goals by Hurtado and Morales. After no score in extra time the game went to penalty kicks where TFC won 4–3 and advanced to the Amway final versus Montreal Impact.

May 24, after goals by Hurtado and Gershon Koffie to go up 2–1 a controversial penalty call on Jay DeMerit let the Seattle Sounders FC leave Vancouver with a 2–2 draw.

Whitecaps finished May (three wins, one draw and one loss)

=== June ===
June 1, Whitecaps got a brace by Morales and goals by Hurtado and Harvey to hold on for a 4–3 victory versus Portland Timbers.

June 7, Hurtado and Mezquida put the Whitecaps up 2–0 versus the Philadelphia Union before Philadelphia scored 3 straight to gain a 3–2 lead. Morales scored in the 81st minute on a penalty kick to earn a tough 3–3 draw.

June 25, Whitecaps settled for their second 0–0 draw of the season when they played the Montreal Impact. Ousted earned his 3rd clean sheet of the season.

June 28, Whitecaps failed to score for the 2nd straight game and their winless streak extended to three games with a 2–0 loss to the Colorado Rapids.

Whitecaps finished June (one win, two draws and one loss)

=== July ===
July 5, in front of an over capacity crown over 22,500 Fernandez scored in the lone goal in the 12th min to give the Whitecaps a 1–0 win over the Sounders.

July 8, Whitecaps announce they are looking into a partnership with the city of New Westminster, BC to field a USL Pro team in Queens Park starting in the 2015 season.

July 11, Whitecaps announced that Russell Teibert has agreed to a contract extension with the club. Per Major League Soccer and club policy, terms of the contract were not disclosed.

July 12, after Carlyle Mitchell scored to give the Whitecaps a 1–0 lead, Chivas USA came back with three straight goals to earn the 3–1 victory.

July 16, in a rematch of the Amway semi-final the Whitecaps and Toronto FC played to a 1–1 draw. Whitecaps got the goal by Mattocks.

July 19, a Mattocks 73rd min penalty kick earned a 1–1 draw with Real Salt Lake. it was the 2nd game in a row where the Whitecaps blew a 1–0 lead.

July 24, Whitecaps captain Jay DeMerit announces his retirement from professional soccer after his second foot injury in two years. Pedro Morales is named as captain until end of season.

July 27, 3rd straight blown lead and 3rd straight draw with a 2–2 game versus FC Dallas. Mattocks opened the scoring in the 11th minute. A penalty kick by Morales in the 83rd min earned the hard-fought draw.

July 30, Whitecaps settled for a 0–0 draw with Chicago Fire. It was the third 0–0 draw if the season and Ousted's 5th clean sheet.

Whitecaps finished July (One win, three draws and one loss)

=== August ===
August 8, Whitecaps sign central back Kendall Waston from Deportivo Saprissa.

August 10, after a Sporting KC own goal to give the Whitecaps a 1–0 lead, Mattocks scored to give the Whitecaps a 2–0 victory who extended their unbeaten streak to five games (1 win 4 draws).

August 16, Whitecaps and Chivas USA played to a 0–0 draw to extend the Whitecaps' unbeaten streak to seven games. It was the Whitecaps fourth scoreless draw of the season and Ousted earned his seventh clean sheet of the season.

August 21, Whitecaps announced that Nigel Reo-Coker has been traded to Chivas USA for Argentina winger Mauro Rosales.

August 23, Whitecaps lost 2–0 to LA Galaxy for their first loss in six games and only the team's fifth loss since October 19, 2013. This game saw the debuts for Kendall Waston and Mauro Rosales.

August 28, Whitecaps announced that defender Jordan Harvey had agreed to a contract extension with the club. Per Major League Soccer and club policy, terms of the contract were not disclosed.

August 30, Whitecaps fell 3–0 to Cascadia rival Portland Timbers. It was the third game in a row where the Whitecaps failed to score.

Whitecaps finished August (One win, one draws and two loss)

=== September ===
September 3, the New Westminster Chamber of Commerce, Queen's Park Residents' Association, and Royal City Youth Soccer Club came together today to provide their support for bringing a Whitecaps FC USL PRO team to New Westminster in 2015.

September 6, the Whitecaps and D.C. United played to a 0–0 draw. Ousted earned his 8th clean sheet of the season.

September 10, Whitecaps earned a 2–0 victory over the visiting San Jose Earthquakes. Morales scored his team leading 9th goal of season in all competitions in 39th minute. Kendall Waston opened his scoring account with the Whitecaps with a header off a Morales cross in the 57th minute. Ousted earned his MLS leading 9th clean sheet of the season.

September 13, Whitecaps lost 2–1 to FC Dallas. Blas Perez scored a brace for FC Dallas and Erik Hurtado scored the only goal for the Caps.

September 15, Whitecaps announced a pre-contract signing of young Canadian residency player Marco Bustos to a home grown player contract. His contract will take effect January 2015. They also announce the home-grown player contract signing of young Canadian Kianz Froese. The city of New Westminster voted against modifications to Queens Park Stadium to allow a Whitecaps USL Pro team. The Whitecaps eventually decided to locate the team in Thunderbird Stadium on the UBC campus.

== Roster ==
As of August 8, 2014

No.	Player	Nationality	Position	Date of birth (age)	Previous club
Goalkeepers
1	David Ousted	Denmark	GK	February 1, 1985 (age 41)	Randers FC
44	Marco Carducci	Canada	GK	September 26, 1996 (age 30)	Vancouver Whitecaps FC Residency
70	Paolo Tornaghi	Italy	GK	June 21, 1988 (age 38)	Chicago Fire
Defenders
2	Jordan Harvey	United States	DF	January 28, 1984 (age 42)	Philadelphia Union
3	Sam Adekugbe	England	DF	January 16, 1995 (age 31)	Vancouver Whitecaps FC Residency
4	Kendall Waston	Costa Rica	DF	January 1, 1988 (age 38)	Deportivo Saprissa
16	Johnny Leverón	Honduras	DF	February 7, 1990 (age 36)	C.D. Motagua
22	Christian Dean	United States	DF	March 14, 1993 (age 33)	California Golden Bears
24	Carlyle Mitchell	Trinidad and Tobago	DF	August 8, 1987 (age 39)	Joe Public F.C.
27	Ethen Sampson	South Africa	DF	December 28, 1993 (age 32)	Vancouver Whitecaps FC U-23
33	Steven Beitashour	Iran	DF	February 1, 1987 (age 39)	San Jose Earthquakes
40	Andy O'Brien	Ireland	DF	June 29, 1979 (age 47)	Leeds United A.F.C.
Midfielders
7	Sebastián Fernández	Uruguay	MF	November 15, 1989 (age 37)	San Luis FC
8	Mehdi Ballouchy	Morocco	MF	April 6, 1983 (age 43)	San Jose Earthquakes
15	Matias Laba	Argentina	MF	December 11, 1991 (age 34)	Toronto FC
25	Andre Lewis (on loan to Charleston Battery)	Jamaica	MF	August 12, 1994 (age 32)	Portsmouth United F.C.
28	Gershon Koffie	Ghana	MF	August 25, 1991 (age 35)	Vancouver Whitecaps (USSF-D2)
29	Nicolás Mezquida	Uruguay	MF	January 21, 1992 (age 34)	Fénix
30	Mauro Rosales	Argentina	MF	February 24, 1981 (age 45)	Chivas USA
31	Russell Teibert	Canada	MF	December 22, 1992 (age 33)	Vancouver Whitecaps (USSF-D2)
32	Marco Bustos	Canada	MF	April 22, 1996 (age 30)	Vancouver Whitecaps FC Residency
36	Bryce Alderson	Canada	MF	February 5, 1994 (age 32)	Vancouver Whitecaps FC Residency
38	Kianz Froese	Canada	MF	April 16, 1996 (age 30)	Vancouver Whitecaps FC Residency
77	Pedro Morales	Chile	MF	May 25, 1985 (age 41)	Málaga CF
Forwards
11	Darren Mattocks	Jamaica	FW	September 2, 1990 (age 36)	Akron Zips
17	Omar Salgado	United States	FW	September 10, 1993 (age 33)	C.D. Guadalajara
19	Erik Hurtado	United States	FW	May 11, 1990 (age 36)	Santa Clara
23	Kekuta Manneh	Gambia	FW	December 30, 1994 (age 31)	Austin Aztex
34	Caleb Clarke	Canada	FW	June 23, 1993 (age 33)	Vancouver Whitecaps FC Residency
45	Mamadou Diouf (on loan to Charleston Battery)	Senegal	FW	July 15, 1990 (age 36)	Connecticut Huskies

=== Transfers ===
==== In ====
No.	Pos.	Player	Transferred from	Fee/notes	Date	Ref.
15	DF	(Iran) Steven Beitashour	(United States) San Jose Earthquakes	Acquired in exchange for allocation money	January 27, 2014	
14	MF	(Morocco) Mehdi Ballouchy	(United States) San Jose Earthquakes	Claimed in 2013 MLS Re-Entry Draft	January 27, 2014	
7	MF	(Uruguay) Sebastián Fernández	(Mexico) Chiapas	1 Year Loan	February 5, 2014	
29	MF	(Uruguay) Nicolás Mezquida	(Uruguay) Fénix	Undisclosed	February 5, 2014	
70	GK	(Italy) Paolo Tornaghi	Unattached	Free	February 18, 2014	
15	MF	(Argentina) Matías Laba	(Canada) Toronto FC	Acquired in exchange for future considerations	February 26, 2014	
77	MF	(Chile) Pedro Morales	(Spain) Málaga CF	Undisclosed / Designated Player	March 5, 2014	
4	DF	(Costa Rica) Kendall Waston	(Costa Rica) Deportivo Saprissa	Undisclosed	August 8, 2014	
30	MF	(Argentina) Mauro Rosales	(United States) Chivas USA	Trade with Chivas USA / Designated Player	August 21, 2014	
32	MF	(Canada) Marco Bustos	(Canada) Whitecaps U18	Signed to HGP contract	September 15, 2014	
38	MF	(Canada) Kianz Froese	(Canada) Whitecaps U18	Signed to HGP contract	September 15, 2014	

==== Out ====
Pos.	Player	Transferred to	Fee/notes	Date	Ref.
GK	(United States) Brad Knighton	(United States) New England Revolution	traded for a conditional 2015 draft pick	December 11, 2013	
FW	(United States) Corey Hertzog	(United States) Seattle Sounders FC	Claimed in Re-Entry Draft	December 18, 2013	
FW	(Brazil) Camilo Sanvezzo	(Mexico) Querétaro	Undisclosed	January 17, 2014	
MF	(Japan) Daigo Kobayashi	(United States) New England Revolution	traded for a 2016 fourth round pick	February 26, 2014	
MF	(England) Matt Watson	(United States) Chicago Fire	Traded for a 2014 International Roster Spot	March 5, 2014	
FW	(Scotland) Kenny Miller		Contract terminated	May 4, 2014	
MF	(Ghana) Aminu Abdallah		Waived	June 27, 2014	
DF	(United States) Jay DeMerit		Retired	July 24, 2014	
MF	(England) Nigel Reo-Coker	Chivas USA	Traded for Mauro Rosales	August 21, 2014	

=== Technical staff ===
Role	Name	Nation
Head coach	Carl Robinson	Wales
Assistant coach	Gordon Forrest	Scotland
Assistant coach	Martyn Pert	England
Head of Scouting & Analysis	Daniel Stenz	Germany
Goalkeeper coach	Marius Røvde	Norway
Physiotherapist	Graeme Poole	Canada

=== Management ===
Role	Name	Nation
Executive Chair	John Furlong	Ireland
President	Bob Lenarduzzi	Canada
Chief Operating Officer	Rachel Lewis	Canada
Vice-President of Finance & Administration	Don Ford	Canada

== Major League Soccer ==
=== Preseason ===
February 5 1	Vancouver Whitecaps FC	3–2	Indy Eleven	Casa Grande, AZ
3:00PM PST	Fisk 26'; Hurtado (yellow card) 70'; Salgado 77', 81'	report	Mendes 29'; Smart 71'	Stadium: Grande Sports World; Referee: Ricardo Salazar

February 6 2	Vancouver Whitecaps FC	1–2	Seattle Sounders FC	Casa Grande, AZ
10:30AM PST	Hurtado 46'; Harvey (yellow card) 48'	report	Pereira 8'; Parsemain 17'	Stadium: Grande Sports World; Referee: Baldomero Toledo

February 9 3	Vancouver Whitecaps FC	1–2	Seattle Sounders FC	Tucson, AZ
10:30AM PST	Mitchell 78'	report	Parsemain 23'; Barrett (yellow card) 47'; Rose 50'; Estrada (yellow card) 86'	Stadium: Kino Sports Complex; Referee: Kevin Stott

February 16 4	Victoria Vikes	0–1	Vancouver Whitecaps FC	Victoria, BC
2:00PM PST	Andrew Ravenhill (yellow card) 25'	report	Lewis 90'	Stadium: Centennial Stadium; Attendance: 2,500; Referee: Juan Marques

February 19 Intasquad Scrimmage	Blue Team	2–1	White Team	Vancouver, BC
	Watson 41'; Lewis 90'	report	Diouf 45'	Stadium: Thunderbird Stadium

==== Rose City Invitational ====
Pos	Team	GP	W	L	D	GF	GA	GD	Pts
1	Vancouver Whitecaps FC	3	2	0	1	8	2	+6	7
2	San Jose Earthquakes	3	2	1	0	2	2	0	6
3	Portland Timbers	3	0	1	2	2	3	-1	2
4	Portmore United	3	0	2	1	2	7	-5	1

February 23 Game 1	Vancouver Whitecaps FC	5–1	Portmore United F.C.	Portland, OR
2:30PM PST	Mezquida 31'; Harvey 49', 71'; Beitashour (yellow card) 55'; Mattocks 65'; Teibert 87'	report	Barrett (red card) 14'; Morris 26'	Stadium: Providence Park; Referee: Allen Chapman

February 26 Game 2	Vancouver Whitecaps FC	2–0	San Jose Earthquakes	Portland, OR
5:00PM PST	Miller 26'; Mattocks 87'	report	Jahn (yellow card) 40'	Stadium: Providence Park

February 29 Game 3	Portland Timbers	1–1	Vancouver Whitecaps FC	Portland, OR
5:00PM PST	Johnson 3'; Kah (yellow card) 57'	report	Reo-Coker (yellow card) 30'; Fernández 79'	Stadium: Providence Park

=== Regular season ===
==== Results ====
Overall								Home						Away					
Pld	Pts	W	L	D	GF	GA	GD	W	L	D	GF	GA	GD	W	L	D	GF	GA	GD
34	50	12	8	14	42	40	+2	9	3	5	27	19	+8	3	5	9	15	21	−6

Last updated: October 26, 2014
Source: Results
Pld = Matches played; Pts = Points; W = Matches won; T = Matches tied; L = Matches lost; GF = Goals for; GA = Goals against; GD = Goal difference

Round	1	2	3	4	5	6	7	8	9	10	11	12	13	14	15	16	17	18	19	20	21	22	23	24	25	26	27	28	29	30	31	32	33	34
Ground	H	A	A	H	H	A	H	A	H	A	H	A	A	H	A	H	H	A	A	H	A	H	A	A	H	H	H	A	A	H	H	A	A	H
Result	W	D	D	W	L	L	D	D	W	W	D	W	D	D	L	W	L	D	D	D	D	W	D	L	L	D	W	L	L	W	W	W	D	W

Updated to match(es) played on October 26, 2014. Source: Schedule | Vancouver Whitecaps FC
A = Away; H = Home; W = Win; D = Draw; L = Loss

All times listed using Pacific Time Zone.

March 8 MLS 1	Vancouver Whitecaps FC	4–1	New York Red Bulls	Vancouver, BC
4:30PM PST	Beitashour (yellow card) 7'; Miller 34' (pen.), 77'; Harvey (yellow card) 36'; Fernández 49'; Teibert (yellow card) 62'; Morales 89'	report	Armando (yellow card) 31'; Sam (yellow card) 87'; Wright-Phillips 90+1'	Stadium: BC Place; Attendance: 21,000; Referee: Abbey Okulaja

March 16 MLS 2	Chivas USA	1–1	Vancouver Whitecaps FC	Carson, CA
4:00PM PDT	Pelletieri (red card) 13'; Torres 45'; Minda (yellow card) 53'; Burling (yellow card) 57'	report	O'Brien (yellow card) 17'; Laba (yellow card) 63'; Manneh 81'	Stadium: StubHub Center; Attendance: 6,684; Referee: Ramon Hernandez

March 22 MLS 3	New England Revolution	0–0	Vancouver Whitecaps FC	Foxborough, MA
11:00AM PDT	Dorman (yellow card) 38'	report	Reo-Coker (yellow card) 8'; Harvey (yellow card) 83'; Laba (yellow card) 88'	Stadium: Gillette Stadium; Attendance: 13,103; Referee: Hilario Grajeda

March 29 MLS 4	Vancouver Whitecaps FC	2–1	Houston Dynamo	Vancouver, BC
4:00PM PDT	Harvey 14'; Miller 58' (pen.)	report	Clark 75'	Stadium: BC Place; Attendance: 21,000; Referee: Kevin Stott

April 5 MLS 5	Vancouver Whitecaps FC	1–2	Colorado Rapids	Vancouver, BC
3:30PM PDT	Mattocks 67'	report	Mari 79', 81'	Stadium: BC Place; Attendance: 21,000; Referee: Ioannis Stavridis

April 12 MLS 6	LA Galaxy	1–0	Vancouver Whitecaps FC	Carson, CA
7:30PM PDT	Keane 47'	report		Stadium: StubHub Center; Attendance: 20,847; Referee: Jair Marrufo

April 19 MLS 7	Vancouver Whitecaps FC	2–2	LA Galaxy	Vancouver, BC
4:00PM PDT	O'Brien (yellow card) 1'; Mattocks 67'; Manneh 86'	report	Husidic (yellow card) 34'; Ishizaki 38'; Keane 77'	Stadium: BC Place; Attendance: 21,000; Referee: Silviu Petrescu

April 26 MLS 8	Real Salt Lake	2–2	Vancouver Whitecaps FC	Sandy, UT
6:30PM PDT	Plata 2'; Saborio 9'; Wingert (yellow card) 65'	report	Manneh (yellow card) 58'; Mezquida 86'; Fernández 90+4'; Leverón (yellow card) 90+5'	Stadium: Rio Tinto Stadium; Attendance: 19,661; Referee: Kevin Stott

May 3 MLS 9	Vancouver Whitecaps FC	3–2	San Jose Earthquakes	Vancouver, BC
4:00PM PDT	Manneh 10'; Morales 19' (pen.), 20' (yellow card) 21'	report	Wondolowski 45' (pen.), 90+1'; Gordon (yellow card) 70'	Stadium: BC Place; Attendance: 21,000; Referee: Drew Fischer

May 10 MLS 10	Columbus Crew	0–1	Vancouver Whitecaps FC	Columbus, OH
4:30PM PDT	Tchani (yellow card) 38'	report	Koffie (yellow card) 21'; Hurtado 37'; Trapp (yellow card) 53'; O'Brien (yellow card) 68'; Beitashour (yellow card) 90+3'	Stadium: Columbus Crew Stadium; Attendance: 14,496; Referee: Hilario Grajeda

May 24 MLS 11	Vancouver Whitecaps FC	2–2	Seattle Sounders FC	Vancouver, British Columbia
4:00PM PDT	Hurtado 39'; Koffie (yellow card) 43' (goal) 66'; Laba (yellow card) 44'; Fernandez (yellow card) 68'	report	Barrett 36'; Pineda 82' (pen.); Alonso (yellow card) 90+2'	Stadium: BC Place; Attendance: 21,000; Referee: Ismail Elfath

June 1 MLS 12	Portland Timbers	3–4	Vancouver Whitecaps FC	Portland, Oregon, US
6:00PM PDT	Urruti 3'; Kah (yellow card) 45'; Fernández 77'; Johnson 86'	report	Morales 16' (pen.), 26' (pen.) (yellow card) 90+3'; Manneh (yellow card) 28'; Fernandez (yellow card) 45'; Hurtado 45+4'; Harvey 49'	Stadium: Providence Park; Attendance: 20,814; Referee: Kevin Stott

June 7 MLS 13	Philadelphia Union	3–3	Vancouver Whitecaps FC	Chester, PA
4:00PM PDT	Gaddis (yellow card) 53'; Casey 63', 71'; Le Toux 68'; MacMath (yellow card) 80'; Lahoud (yellow card) 90+3'	[report]	Hurtado 18'; Mezquida 41'; Morales 81' (pen.); Leveron (yellow card) 90+2'	Stadium: PPL Park; Attendance: 18,843; Referee: Jose Carlos Rivero

June 25 MLS 14	Vancouver Whitecaps FC	0–0	Montreal Impact	Vancouver, BC
7:00PM PDT	Mitchell (yellow card) 82'; Koffie (yellow card) 90+3'	report	Tissot (yellow card) 10'; Romero (yellow card) 33'; Larrea (yellow card) 74'	Stadium: BC Place; Attendance: 21,000; Referee: Drew Fischer

June 28 MLS 15	Colorado Rapids	2–0	Vancouver Whitecaps FC	Commerce City, CO
6:00PM PDT	Powers 20'; Sánchez 36' (pen.); LaBrocca (yellow card) 87'	report	Reo-Coker (yellow card) 54'	Stadium: Dick's Sporting Goods Park; Attendance: 14,978; Referee: Ted Unkel

July 5 MLS 16	Vancouver Whitecaps FC	1–0	Seattle Sounders FC	Vancouver, BC
7:00PM PDT	Fernández 12'	Report	Barrett (yellow card) 79'	Stadium: BC Place; Attendance: 22,500; Referee: Baldomero Toledo

July 12 MLS 17	Vancouver Whitecaps FC	1–3	Chivas USA	Vancouver, BC
7:00PM PDT	Mitchell (yellow card) 2' (goal) 28'; Fernández (yellow card) 54'; Harvey (red card) 69'	Report	Pelletieri 48'; Torres 81'; Delgado (yellow card) 89'; Barrera 90+4'	Stadium: BC Place; Attendance: 19,383; Referee: Armando Villarreal

July 16 MLS 18	Toronto FC	1–1	Vancouver Whitecaps FC	Toronto, ON
5:00PM PDT	Orr (yellow card) 28'; Defoe 64' (pen.); Warner (yellow card) 90+3'	Report	Mattocks 50'; Teibert (yellow card) 61'; Reo-Coker (yellow card) 70'; Adekugbe (yellow card) 85'	Stadium: BMO Field; Attendance: 22,591; Referee: Allen Chapman

July 19 MLS 19	Real Salt Lake	1–1	Vancouver Whitecaps FC	Sandy, UT
7:00PM PDT	Beckerman (yellow card) 17'; Beltran (yellow card) 76'; Plata 81'; Wingert (yellow card) 90+7'	Report	Mattocks 73' (pen.); Fernández (yellow card) 75'; Laba (yellow card) 75'; Ousted (yellow card) 76'; Koffie (yellow card) 88'	Stadium: Rio Tinto Stadium; Attendance: 20,265; Referee: Edwin Jurisevic

July 27 MLS 20	Vancouver Whitecaps FC	2–2	FC Dallas	Vancouver, BC
2:00PM PDT	Mattocks 11' (yellow card) 59'; Morales 53' (pen.)	Report	Pérez 29'; Michel 39' (pen.)	Stadium: BC Place; Attendance: 21,000; Referee: Kevin Stott

July 30 MLS 21	Chicago Fire	0–0	Vancouver Whitecaps FC	Bridgeview, IL
5:30PM PDT	Ritter (yellow card) 28'; Palmer (yellow card) 70'	Report	Harvey (yellow card) 36'; Leverón (yellow card) 63'	Stadium: Toyota Park; Attendance: 13,532; Referee: Fotis Bazakos

August 10 MLS 22	Vancouver Whitecaps FC	2–0	Sporting KC	Vancouver, BC
5:00PM PDT	Igor Julião 17' (o.g.); Mattocks 39'; Hurtado (yellow card) 63'; Harvey (yellow card) 84'	Report	Dwyer (yellow card) 25'; Feilhaber (yellow card) 62'	Stadium: BC Place; Attendance: 20,183; Referee: Dave Gantar

August 16 MLS 23	Chivas USA	0–0	Vancouver Whitecaps FC	Carson, CA
7:30PM PDT	Pelletieri (yellow card) 49'; Rosales (yellow card) 79'; Barrera (yellow card) 82'	Report	Laba (yellow card) 36'	Stadium: StubHub Center; Attendance: 4,215; Referee: Edvin Jurisevic

August 23 MLS 24	LA Galaxy	2–0	Vancouver Whitecaps FC	Carson, CA
7:30PM PDT	Donovan 4'; Gargan (yellow card) 21'; Sarvas 32'; DeLaGarza (yellow card) 78'; Sarvas (yellow card) 80'; Gonzalez (yellow card) 83'	Report	Balloucy (yellow card) 60'; Waston (yellow card) 87'; Leveron (red card) 90'	Stadium: StubHub Center; Attendance: 21,637; Referee: Allan Chapman

August 30 MLS 25	Vancouver Whitecaps FC	0–3	Portland Timbers	Vancouver, BC
7:30PM PDT		Report	Powell 51'; Chara (yellow card) 66'; Urruti 75'; Wallace 79'; Rodney Wallace (yellow card) 79'	Stadium: BC Place; Attendance: 21,000; Referee: Armando Villarreal

September 6 MLS 26	Vancouver Whitecaps FC	0–0	D.C. United	Vancouver, BC
7:00PM PDT		Report	Boswell (yellow card) 18'	Stadium: BC Place; Attendance: 18,116; Referee: Drew Fisher

September 10 MLS 27	Vancouver Whitecaps FC	2–0	San Jose Earthquakes	Vancouver, BC
7:00PM PDT	Morales 39'; Waston 57'; Sebastian Fernandez (yellow card) 59'	Report	Stewart (yellow card) 46'	Stadium: BC Place; Attendance: 17,183; Referee: Jose Carlos Rivero

September 13 MLS 28	FC Dallas	2–1	Vancouver Whitecaps FC	Frisco, TX
5:30PM PDT	Pérez 21' 78'	Report	Watson (yellow card) 30'; Teibert (yellow card) 45+2'; Hurtado 67'; Harvey (yellow card) 89'	Stadium: Toyota Stadium; Attendance: 16,792; Referee: Ted Unkel

September 20 MLS 29	Portland Timbers	3–0	Vancouver Whitecaps FC	Portland, OR
2:00PM PDT	Kah (yellow card) 24'; Valeri 28'; Adi 66', 69'	Report	Laba (yellow card) 16'; Waston (yellow card) 24'	Stadium: Providence Park; Attendance: 20,814; Referee: Hilario Grajeda

September 27 MLS 30	Vancouver Whitecaps FC	2–1	Real Salt Lake	Vancouver, BC
4:00PM PDT	Beitashour (yellow card) 36'; Morales 62' (pen.), 78' (yellow card) 79'; Teibert (yellow card) 63'	Report	Borchers 57'; Salcedo (yellow card) 60'	Stadium: BC Place; Attendance: 19,395; Referee: Allen Chapman

October 4 MLS 31	Vancouver Whitecaps FC	2–0	FC Dallas	Vancouver, BC
4:00PM PDT	Fernández 14', 18' (yellow card) 90+4'; Waston (yellow card) 78'	Report	Watson (yellow card) 60'	Stadium: BC Place; Attendance: 20,183; Referee: Ricardo Salazar

October 10 MLS 32	Seattle Sounders FC	0–1	Vancouver Whitecaps FC	Seattle, WA
7:00PM PDT	González (yellow card) 41'; Dempsey (yellow card) 64'	Report	Manneh 45'; Waston (yellow card) 75'; Laba (yellow card) 85'	Stadium: CenturyLink Field; Attendance: 55,765; Referee: Jair Marrufo

October 18 MLS 33	San Jose Earthquakes	0–0	Vancouver Whitecaps FC	Santa Clara, CA
7:30PM PDT		Report	Rosales (yellow card) 86'	Stadium: Buck Shaw Stadium; Attendance: 10,525; Referee: Drew Fisher

October 25 MLS 34	Vancouver Whitecaps FC	1–0	Colorado Rapids	Vancouver, BC
7:00PM PDT	Waston 70'; Harvey (yellow card) 87'	Report	Torres (yellow card) 17'	Stadium: BC Place; Attendance: 21,000; Referee: Kevin Stott

==== Tables ====
===== Western Conference =====
Pos	Team	Pld	W	L	T	GF	GA	GD	Pts	Qualification
1	Seattle Sounders FC	34	20	10	4	65	50	+15	64	Qualification for the conference semifinals
2	LA Galaxy	34	17	7	10	69	37	+32	61	Qualification for the conference semifinals
3	Real Salt Lake	34	15	8	11	54	39	+15	56	Qualification for the conference semifinals
4	FC Dallas	34	16	12	6	55	45	+10	54	Qualification for the knockout round
5	Vancouver Whitecaps FC	34	12	8	14	42	40	+2	50	Qualification for the knockout round
6	Portland Timbers	34	12	9	13	61	52	+9	49	
7	Chivas USA	34	9	19	6	29	61	−32	33	
8	Colorado Rapids	34	8	18	8	43	62	−19	32	
9	San Jose Earthquakes	34	6	16	12	35	50	−15	30	

Source: MLS

===== Overall =====
Pos	Team	Pld	W	L	T	GF	GA	GD	Pts	Qualification
1	Seattle Sounders FC (S, U)	34	20	10	4	65	50	+15	64	Qualification for the CONCACAF Champions League
2	LA Galaxy (C)	34	17	7	10	69	37	+32	61	Qualification for the CONCACAF Champions League
3	D.C. United	34	17	9	8	52	37	+15	59	Qualification for the CONCACAF Champions League
4	Real Salt Lake	34	15	8	11	54	39	+15	56	Qualification for the CONCACAF Champions League
5	New England Revolution	34	17	13	4	51	46	+5	55	
6	FC Dallas	34	16	12	6	55	45	+10	54	
7	Columbus Crew	34	14	10	10	52	42	+10	52	
8	New York Red Bulls	34	13	10	11	55	50	+5	50	
9	Vancouver Whitecaps FC	34	12	8	14	42	40	+2	50	Qualification for the CONCACAF Champions League
10	Sporting Kansas City	34	14	13	7	48	41	+7	49	
11	Portland Timbers	34	12	9	13	61	52	+9	49	
12	Philadelphia Union	34	10	12	12	51	51	0	42	
13	Toronto FC	34	11	15	8	44	54	−10	41	
14	Houston Dynamo	34	11	17	6	39	58	−19	39	
15	Chicago Fire	34	6	10	18	41	51	−10	36	
16	Chivas USA	34	9	19	6	29	61	−32	33	
17	Colorado Rapids	34	8	18	8	43	62	−19	32	
18	San Jose Earthquakes	34	6	16	12	35	50	−15	30	
19	Montreal Impact (V)	34	6	18	10	38	58	−20	28	

Source: MLS
Rules for classification: 1) points; 2) head-to-head record; 3) goal difference; 4) number of goals scored
(C) MLS Cup champions; (S) Supporters' Shield winners; (U) U.S. Open Cup winners; (V) Canadian Championship winners

=== Playoffs ===
==== Knockout round ====
October 29	F.C. Dallas	2–1	Vancouver Whitecaps FC	Frisco, TX
6:00PM PDT	Watson (yellow card) 35'; Akindele 40'; Michel 84' (pen.); Escobar (yellow card) 85'; Díaz (yellow card) 86'	Report	Koffie (yellow card) 14'; Morales (yellow card) 45'; Waston (yellow card) 57'; Hurtado 64'; Fernández (yellow card) 85' (red card) 90+6'	Stadium: Toyota Stadium; Attendance: 10,279; Referee: Mark Geiger

== Canadian Championship ==
May 7 1	Toronto FC	2–1	Vancouver Whitecaps FC	Toronto, ON
3:00PM PST	Defoe 28'; Bradley (yellow card) 28', (goal) 89'; De Rosario (yellow card) 90'		Mitchell (yellow card) 48'; Reo-Coker (yellow card) 60'; Manneh 90', (yellow card) 90'	Stadium: BMO Field; Attendance: 22,591; Referee: Mathieu BOURDEAU

May 14 2	Vancouver Whitecaps FC	2–1 (3 - 3 agg.) (3–5 p)	Toronto FC	Vancouver, BC
10:30AM PST	Mitchell (yellow card) 30'; Hurtado 43'; Salgado (yellow card) 78'; Morales 86'		Henry 4'; Bekker (yellow card) 16'; Orr (yellow card) 89'; Bloom (yellow card) 90'	Stadium: BC Place; Attendance: 18,470; Referee: David Gantar
	Penalties
	Laba (penalty scored); Manneh (penalty missed); Fernandez (penalty scored); Teibert (penalty scored)		(penalty scored) Orr; (penalty scored) Moore; (penalty scored) De Rosario; (penalty scored) Bradley; (penalty scored) Nakajima-Farran

== Cascadia Cup ==
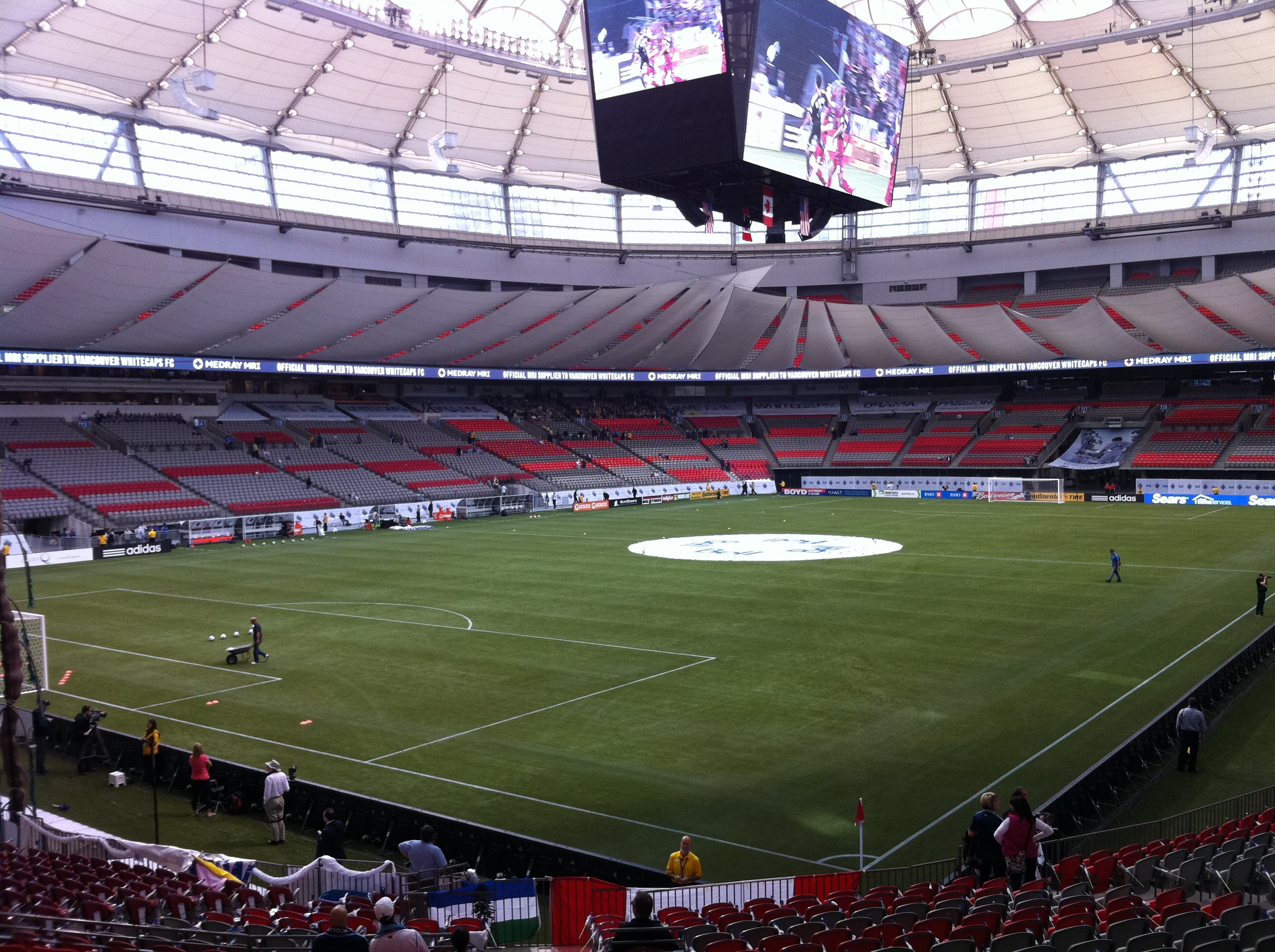
Vancouver Whitecaps FC debut at BC Place on October 2 against Cascadia rivals and expansion cousins, Portland Timbers.

The Whitecaps have had a long-standing rivalry with the Pacific Northwest clubs Seattle Sounders FC and Portland Timbers, dating back to the 1970s when ancestry clubs of the same name played in the original and now-defunct North American Soccer League. The tri-member tournament continued in 2014.

The winner is determined through league matches between the sides, and the club with the best record against both sides wins the trophy. As a result, the Whitecaps played three matches each against Portland and Seattle, winning the trophy for the second year in a row with a record of three wins (two against Seattle, one vs Portland), two losses (both to Portland), and a single draw with the Seattle Sounders, for a total of 10 points.

Pos	Team	GP	W	L	D	GF	GA	GD	Pts
1	Vancouver Whitecaps FC	6	3	2	1	8	11	-3	10
2	Seattle Sounders FC	6	2	2	2	12	10	+2	8
3	Portland Timbers	6	2	3	1	15	14	+1	7

Updated as of October 10, 2014

=== Cascadia Scoring ===
Field players

Cascadia Scoring
Player	Team	G	A
Clint Dempsey	SEA	5	1
Pedro Morales	VAN	4	2
Obafemi Martins	SEA	2	2
Diego Valeri	POR	1	3
Gonzalo Pineda	SEA	1	3
Fanendo Adi	POR	2	1
4 players with 2 points			
16 players with 1 point			

Updated as of August 25, 2013

=== Cascadia Goalkeepers ===
Goalkeepers

Cascadia Keepers
Player	Team	W	L	D	Mins	GAA	SO
David Ousted	VAN	2	1	1	360	2.00	1
Stefan Frei	SEA	2	1	2	450	2.00	0
Andrew Weber	POR	0	0	1	90	4.00	0
Donovan Ricketts	POR	1	3	0	360	2.25	1

Updated as of September 4, 2014

== Player stats ==
=== Goalkeeper stats ===
No.	Nat.	Player	Total				Major League Soccer				Canadian Championship				MLS Cup Playoffs			
No.	Nat.	Player	MIN	SV	GA	GAA	MIN	SV	GA	GAA	MIN	SV	GA	GAA	MIN	SV	GA	GAA
1	(Denmark)	David Ousted	2,520	77	36	1.29	2,520	77	36	1.29	0	0	0	0	0	0	0	0
44	(Canada)	Marco Carducci	210	8	3	1.50	0	0	0	0	210	8	3	1.50	0	0	0	0
70	(Italy)	Paolo Tornaghi	0	0	0	0	0	0	0	0	0	0	0	0	0	0	0	0

Updated to match played Sep 19, 2014
Source: Vancouver Whitecaps FC

=== Top scorer ===
Includes all competitive matches.

Ran	No.	Pos	Nat	Name	Major League Soccer	MLS Cup Playoffs	Canadian Championship	Total
1	77	MF	(Chile)	Pedro Morales	8		1	9
2	11	FW	(Jamaica)	Darren Mattocks	6			6
3	19	FW	(United States)	Erik Hurtado	5		1	6
4	23	FW	(The Gambia)	Kekuta Manneh	3		1	4
5	9	FW	(Scotland)	Kenny Miller	3			3
5	7	MF	(Uruguay)	Sebastian Fernandez	3			3
7	29	FW	(Uruguay)	Nicolas Mezquida	2			2
7	2	DF	(United States)	Jordan Harvey	2			2
9	24	DF	(Trinidad and Tobago)	Carlyle Mitchell	1			1
9	28	MF	(Ghana)	Gershon Koffie	1			1
9	4	DF	(Costa Rica)	Kendall Waston	1			1

=== Top assists ===
Includes all competitive matches.

Ran	No.	Pos	Nat	Name	Major League Soccer	MLS Cup Playoffs	Canadian Championship	Total
1	77	MF	(Chile)	Pedro Morales	10		1	11
2	11	FW	(Jamaica)	Darren Mattocks	3			3
3	19	FW	(United States)	Erik Hurtado	2			2
3	20	NF	(England)	Nigel Reo-Coker	2			2
3	31	MF	(Canada)	Russell Teibert	2			2
3	33	DF	(Iran)	Steven Beitashour	2			2
7	40	DF	(Republic of Ireland)	Andy O'Brien	1			1
7	1	GK	(Denmark)	David Ousted	1			1
7	28	MF	(Ghana)	Gershon Koffie	1			1
7	9	FW	(Scotland)	Kenny Miller	1			1
7	15	ML	(Argentina)	Matias Laba	1			1
7	23	FW	(The Gambia)	Kekuta Manneh	1			1
7	30	MF	(Argentina)	Mauro Rosales	1			1

=== Top minutes played ===
Includes all competitive matches. The list is sorted by shirt number when total minutes are equal.

Ran	No.	Pos	Nat	Name	Major League Soccer	MLS Cup Playoffs	Canadian Championship	Total
1	1	GK	(Denmark)	David Ousted	2,520			2,520
2	2	DF	(United States)	Jordan Harvey	2,399			2,399
3	15	MF	(Argentina)	Matias Laba	2,227		23	2,250
4	77	MF	(Chile)	Pedro Morales	2.043		90	2,133
5	33	DF	(Iran)	Steven Beitashour	1,888			1,888
6	40	DF	(Republic of Ireland)	Andy O'Brien	1,718			1,718
7	11	FW	(Jamaica)	Darren Mattocks	1,650			1,650
8	31	MF	(Canada)	Russell Teibert	1,464		180	1,644
9	19	FW	(United States)	Erik Hurtado	1,418		167	1,585
10	7	MF	(Uruguay)	Sebastian Fernandez	1,527		20	1,547
11	28	MF	(Ghana)	Gershon Koffie	1,512			1,512
12	16	DF	(Honduras)	Johnny Leveron	1,305		180	1,490
13	23	FW	(The Gambia)	Kekuta Manneh	981		103	1,086
14	6	DF	(United States)	Jay DeMerit	924			924
15	24	DF	(Trinidad and Tobago)	Carlyle Mitchell	720		180	900
16	20	MF	(England)	Nigel Reo-Coker	697		180	877
17	9	FW	(Scotland)	Kenny Miller	637			637
18	29	FW	(Uruguay)	Nicolas Mezquida	369		161	530
19	4	DF	(Costa Rica)	Kendall Waston	371			371
20	30	MF	(Argentina)	Mauro Rosales	349			349
21	22	DF	(United States)	Christian Dean	123		177	300
22	8	MF	(Morocco)	Mehdi Ballouchy	267			267
23	17	FW	(United States)	Omar Salgado	198		46	244
24	44	GK	(Canada)	Marco Carducci			180	180
25	36	MF	(Canada)	Bryce Alderson			157	157
26	27	DF	(South Africa)	Ethan Sampson	144			144
27	3	DF	(Canada)	Sam Adekugbe	136			136
28	38	MF	(Canada)	Kianz Froese			77	77
29	32	MF	(Canada)	Marco Bustos			63	63

=== Disciplinary record ===
Includes all competitive matches. The list is sorted by position, and then shirt number.

N	P	Nat.	Name	Major League Soccer			Canadian Championship			MLS Playoffs			Others			Total			Notes
N	P	Nat.	Name	Yellow card	Second yellow card	Red card	Yellow card	Second yellow card	Red card	Yellow card	Second yellow card	Red card	Yellow card	Second yellow card	Red card	Yellow card	Second yellow card	Red card	Notes
1	GK	(Denmark)	David Ousted	1												1			
44	GK	(Canada)	Marco Carducci																
70	GK	(Italy)	Paolo Tornaghi																Suspended for May 13 game vs SJ Earthquakes
2	DF	(United States)	Jordan Harvey	5		1										5		1	Suspended for July 16 game vs TFC
3	DF	(Canada)	Sam Adekugbe	1												1			
4	DF	(Costa Rica)	Kendall Waston	2												2			
6	DF	(United States)	Jay Demerit	2												2			
15	DF	(Honduras)	Johnny Leveron	2		1										2		1	Suspended for August 30 gave vs Portland Timbers
22	DF	(United States)	Christian Dean																
24	DF	(Trinidad and Tobago)	Carlyle Mitchell				2									2			
27	DF	(South Africa)	Ethan Sampson																
33	DF	(Iran)	Steven Beitashour	2												2			
40	DF	(Ireland)	Andy O'Brien	3												3			
7	MF	(Uruguay)	Sebastian Fernandez	5												5			
8	MF	(Morocco)	Mehdi Ballouchy	1												1			
15	MF	(Argentina)	Matias Laba	5	1											5	1		Suspended for April 12 game vs LA Galaxy; Suspended for August 23 game vs LA Galaxy
20	MF	(England)	Nigel Reo-Coker	3			1									4			
28	MF	(Ghana)	Gershon Koffie	4			1									5			
29	MF	(Uruguay)	Nicolas Mezquida																
30	MF	(Argentina)	Mauro Rosales	4												4			4 yellow cards w/ Chivas USA
31	MF	(Canada)	Russell Teibert	3												3			
36	MF	(Canada)	Bryce Alderson																
77	MF	(Chile)	Pedro Morales	3												3			
9	FW	(Scotland)	Kenny Miller																
11	FW	(Jamaica)	Darren Mattocks	2												2			
17	FW	(United States)	Omar Salgado				1									1			
19	FW	(United States)	Erik Hurtado	1												1			
23	FW	(The Gambia)	Kekuta Manneh	2												2			
34	FW	(Canada)	Caleb Clarke																

Last updated: Sep 19, 2014
Source: Competitive matches
Ordered by (red card) , (second yellow card) and (yellow card)
(yellow card) = Number of bookings; (second yellow card) = Number of sending offs after a second yellow card; (red card) = Number of sending offs by a direct red card.

Italic: denotes no longer with club.

== Player Salaries ==
- 2014 Guaranteed Compensation

2014 Roster
Player	$
Pedro Morales	$1,410,900.00
Kenny Miller	$940,000.00
Nigel Reo-Coker	$446,500.00
Matias Laba	$300,000.00
Andy O'Brien	$280,000.00
David Ousted	$266,156.25
Jay Demerit	$247,500.00
Darren Mattocks	$232,000.00
Gershon Koffie	$211,000.00
Steven Beitashour	$177,166.67
Christian Dean	$161,000.00
Sebastian Fernandez	$143,000.00
Omar Salgado	$141,868.67
Jordan Harvey	$123,750.00
Bryce Alderson	$115,000.00
Kekuta Manneh	$99,500.00
Johnny Leveron	$91,187.50
Erik Hurtado	$86,150.00
Russell Teibert	$75,600.00
Paolo Tornaghi	$72,000.00
Mehdi Ballouchy	$65,000.00
Nicolas Mezquida	$65,000.00
Mamadou Diof	$61,000.00
Caleb Clarke	$60,000.00
Sam Adekugbe	$55,000.00
Andre Lewis	$53,500.00
Aminu Abdallah	$48,825.00
Carlyle Mitchell	$48,825.00
Marco Carducci	$36,504.00
Ethan Sampson	$48,825.00
