= Steven Beitashour =

Iranian footballer

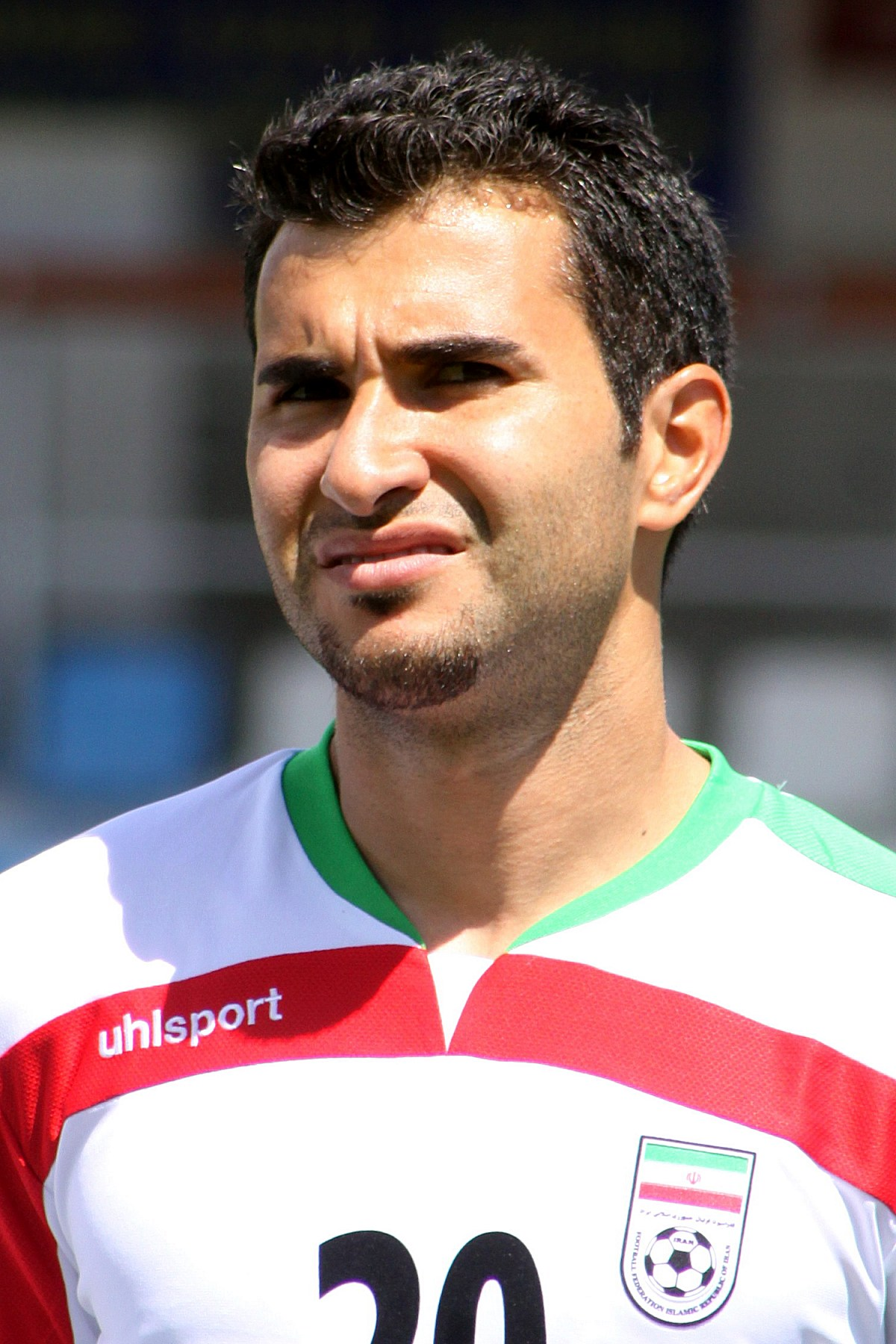
- Beitashour with Iran in 2014

Personal information
- Full name: Steven Mehrdad Beitashour
- Date of birth: February 1, 1987 (age 39)
- Place of birth: San Jose, California, U.S.
- Height: 5 ft 10 in (1.78 m)
- Position: Right-back

Youth career
- Fremont Fury

College career
Years	Team	Apps	(Gls)
2005–2009	San Diego State Aztecs	57	(0)

Senior career*
Years	Team	Apps	(Gls)
2007–2008	San Jose Frogs	9	(2)
2010–2013	San Jose Earthquakes	87	(2)
2014–2015	Vancouver Whitecaps FC	54	(0)
2016–2017	Toronto FC	51	(0)
2018–2019	Los Angeles FC	55	(3)
2020–2023	Colorado Rapids	42	(0)
2022–2023	→ Colorado Rapids 2 (loan)	2	(0)
Total		300	(7)

International career^{‡}
2013–2014	Iran	6	(0)
- * Club domestic league appearances and goals as of October 21, 2022 ‡ National team caps and goals as of May 30, 2014

Steven Mehrdad Beitashour (/ˈbeɪtəʃʊər/ BAY-tə-shoor; Persian: استیون مهرداد بیت‌آشور [mehɾdɒːd-e beit-ɒːʃuːɾ], Syriac: ܣܬܝܒܢ ܡܗܪܕܐܕ ܒܝܬ ܐܫܘܪ; born February 1, 1987) is a former professional soccer player who played as a right-back, and is currently the assistant coach at Toronto FC. Born in the United States and previously called up to the United States national team, he represented the Iran national team. During his playing career, Beitashour made over 300 club appearances across five different MLS teams, and notably helped them win trophies such as the MLS Cup, the Supporters' Shield, and the Canadian Championship.

== Background ==
Steven Beitashour was born to Edward and Pari Beitashour in San Jose, California, and played youth soccer for Fremont Fury. He has an older brother, Tony, and two sisters, Tina and Stephanie. His parents are both from Iran and moved to the United States in the 1960s. His father, an electrical engineer, played soccer for San Francisco State University before working for Apple. Beitashour is of Assyrian Christian descent from his father's side and Shia Muslim Persian descent from his mother's side, enjoying support from both communities in the United States. He has Iranian-American dual citizenship, and is married to his wife named Karlie. The couple announced the birth of their son Brayden on February 1, 2019, their son Zayne in May 2022, and their daughter Kaylyn on Christmas Day in December 2025.

== Club career ==
=== College and amateur ===
Beitashour graduated from Leland High School in 2005 where his number 3 jersey was later retired, becoming only the second Leland athlete after Pat Tillman to have a jersey retired. Steven was the captain of his high school's varsity team and was their leading goalscorer his junior and senior years in the number 10 role. He was a four-year letter-winner and was a two-time offensive player of the year before being a divisional first-team selection. In his graduating year at Leland, Beitashour received the inaugural Pat Tillman Award, given to a Bay Area student for outstanding achievements in both athletics and academics.

He went on to play four years of college soccer at San Diego State University after receiving a scholarship, redshirting his freshman season. He majored in communication with a minor in biology at San Diego State University, choosing it over several schools including San Jose State University, University of California, Santa Cruz and Notre Dame de Namur University. Coach Lev Kirshner moved Beitashour to the right-back position in order to utilize his quick speed and one-on-one defending abilities. In his senior year at State, Steven earned an all-Pac-10 honorable mention. During his late college years, Beitashour also played for the San Jose Frogs in the Premier Development League. He graduated from San Diego State in December 2009.

=== Professional ===
==== San Jose Earthquakes ====
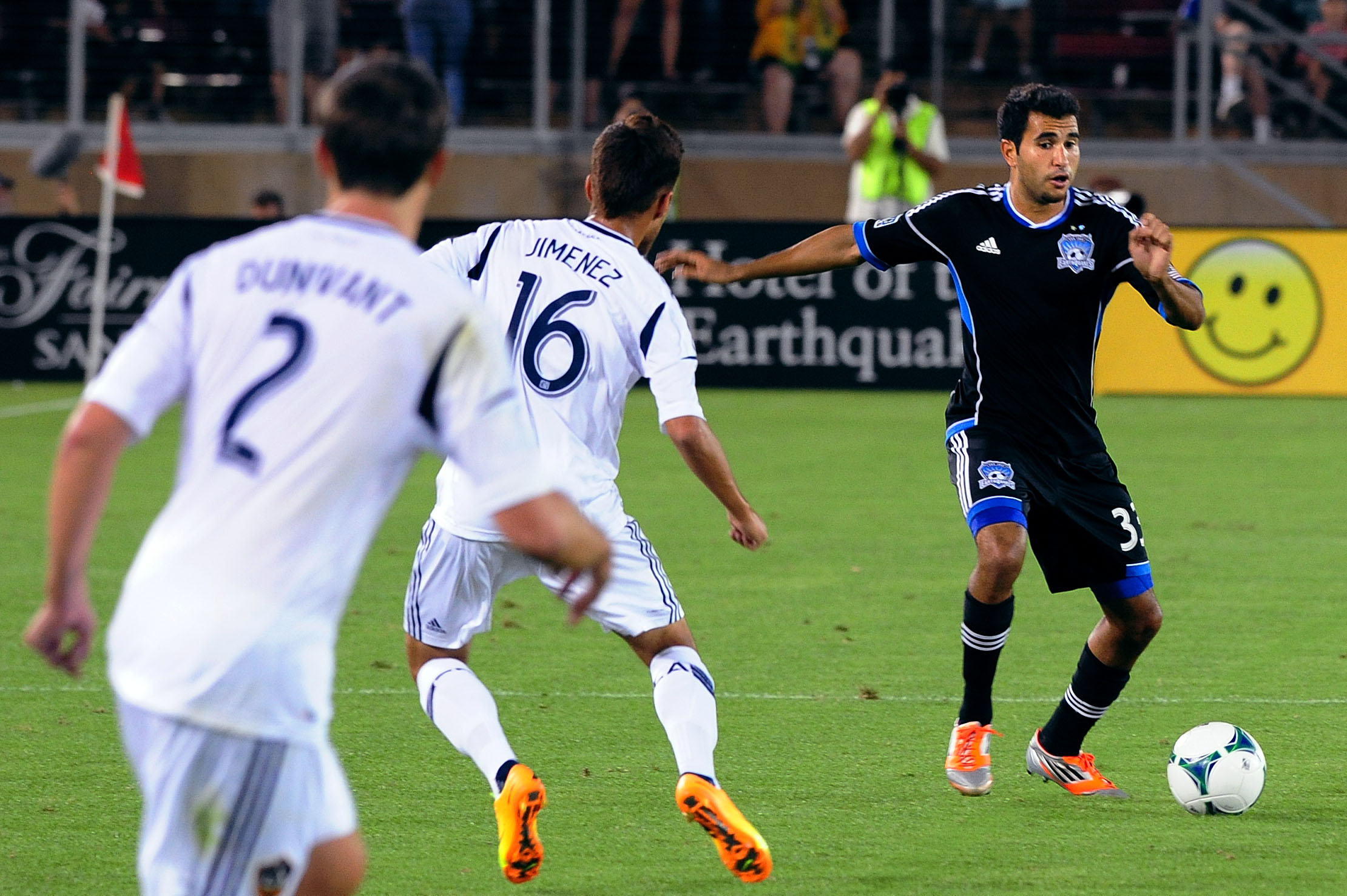
Steven Beitashour playing for San Jose Earthquakes

Beitashour was drafted in the second round (30th overall) of the 2010 MLS SuperDraft by the San Jose Earthquakes, the local team that he supported as a young ball boy, becoming the second Iranian (after Khodadad Azizi) to play for the Earthquakes. He made his professional debut on April 10, 2010, in a 2–1 win against the Chicago Fire, and scored his first professional goal on April 24, 2010, against Chivas USA. Beitashour was selected for the 2012 MLS All-Star Game and played the full 90 minutes against Chelsea in the 3–2 win. The Earthquakes won the 2012 MLS Supporters' Shield with Beitashour starting in all 33 of his regular season appearances and leading the league with 110 crosses that season. Following the Supporters' Shield title, Beitashour featured for the Earthquakes in the 2013–14 CONCACAF Champions League. He provided 16 assists in his last 3 years with the Earthquakes, more than any other MLS defender during the same time period.

Steven is arguably the best right back in the league. He is fantastic on the defensive side of the ball and his ability to join the attack will make him a great addition to our club.

— Whitecaps FC manager Carl Robinson on Beitashour, January 27, 2014.

==== Vancouver Whitecaps FC ====
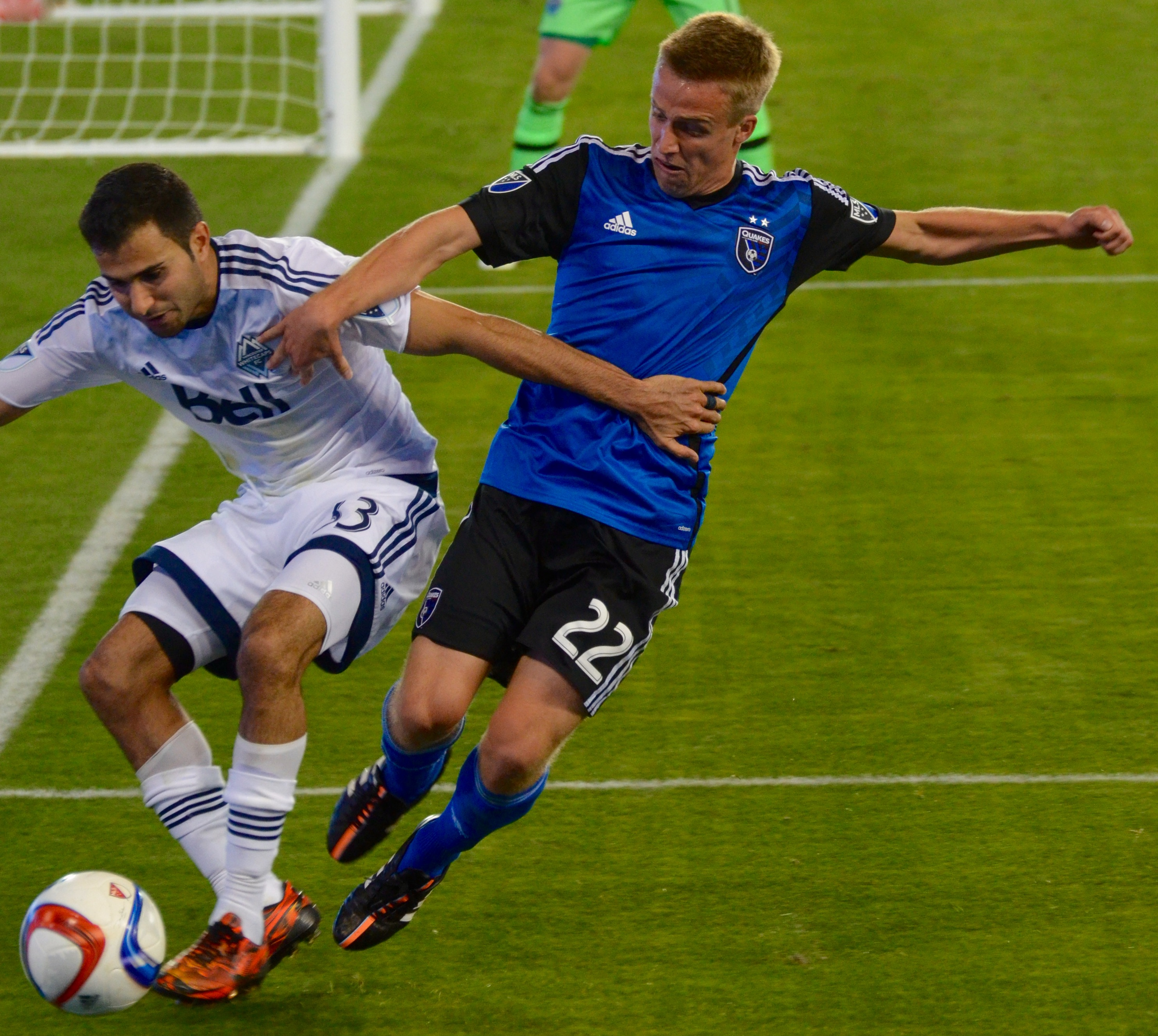
Steven Beitashour for Vancouver Whitecaps

Vancouver Whitecaps FC acquired Beitashour for an undisclosed amount on January 27, 2014. On March 8, Beitashour played his first match for the Whitecaps in their season opener against the New York Red Bulls, providing a secondary assist to Kenny Miller in their 4–1 win. Beitashour was named in the MLS team of the week after his performance against the LA Galaxy on April 19. On April 26, he provided a game-tying assist to Sebastián Fernández in the last minute of the match against Real Salt Lake. Beitashour was nominated for the 2014 MLS All-Star Game against Bayern Munich. On September 27, he provided a game-winning assist to Pedro Morales in a 2–1 win against Real Salt Lake. On October 10, the Whitecaps won the 2014 Cascadia Cup with a 1–0 win at Seattle Sounders FC. The Whitecaps also qualified for the 2015–16 CONCACAF Champions League as the best Canadian team of the regular season.

He's just a great guy to have in the locker room. He's always positive, he's always smiling, and he's always a guy that you want to go to battle with and fight for.

— Whitecaps FC captain Jay DeMerit on Beitashour, June 2, 2014.

Prior to the start of the 2015 MLS season, Beitashour was the Whitecaps' players union representative. On March 14, 2015, in the second game of the Whitecaps' 2015 season, Beitashour provided an assist to Octavio Rivero during the 86th minute in a 1–0 win over the Chicago Fire. On July 29, 2015, Beitashour and his Whitecaps teammates attended a charity event for children in Nanaimo. On August 26, 2015, the Whitecaps won the 2015 Canadian Championship to qualify for the 2016–17 CONCACAF Champions League.

==== Toronto FC ====
Beitashour was traded to Toronto FC during the 2015–16 off-season for TFC's second round selection in the 2016 MLS SuperDraft. He made his debut for Toronto FC in a 2–0 win over the New York Red Bulls on March 6, 2016. On November 30, 2016, Beitashour provided an assist to Benoît Cheyrou to clinch the Eastern Conference title during the 2016 MLS Cup Playoffs. On October 22, 2017, Toronto FC won the Supporters' Shield, breaking the MLS record for the most points in a single season. On December 9, 2017, Beitashour won the 2017 MLS Cup with Toronto FC for the first time in the club's history, becoming the first MLS team to complete a domestic treble.

==== Los Angeles FC ====
In January 2018, Beitashour signed with Los Angeles FC for their inaugural season. He provided two assists in their second match before providing another one in their following match to Carlos Vela in the first El Tráfico derby. He scored his first goal for LAFC on May 5, 2018, against FC Dallas. He scored his second goal for the club on June 9, 2018, against his hometown club, the San Jose Earthquakes. In October 2018, LAFC unveiled a Persian language T-shirt in honor of Beitashour. In September 2019, Beitashour and LAFC won the club's first major trophy with the Supporters' Shield.

==== Colorado Rapids ====
On September 19, 2020, Beitashour signed a one-year deal with Colorado Rapids as a free agent. In December 2020, Beitashour signed a one-year contract extension with the Rapids ahead of the 2021 Major League Soccer season. He made his club debut on July 21, 2021, in a league match against FC Dallas. Having scored five goals and provided 38 assists across 258 regular-season games in his MLS career, Beitashour re-signed with the Rapids on January 7, 2022, for the 2022 Major League Soccer season. On November 10, 2022, his contract option was declined by Colorado. On December 13, 2022, the Colorado Rapids re-signed Beitashour for the 2023 Major League Soccer season. On November 28, 2023, his contract option was declined by Colorado. On December 13, 2023, Beitashour announced his retirement.

== International career ==
=== Eligibility ===
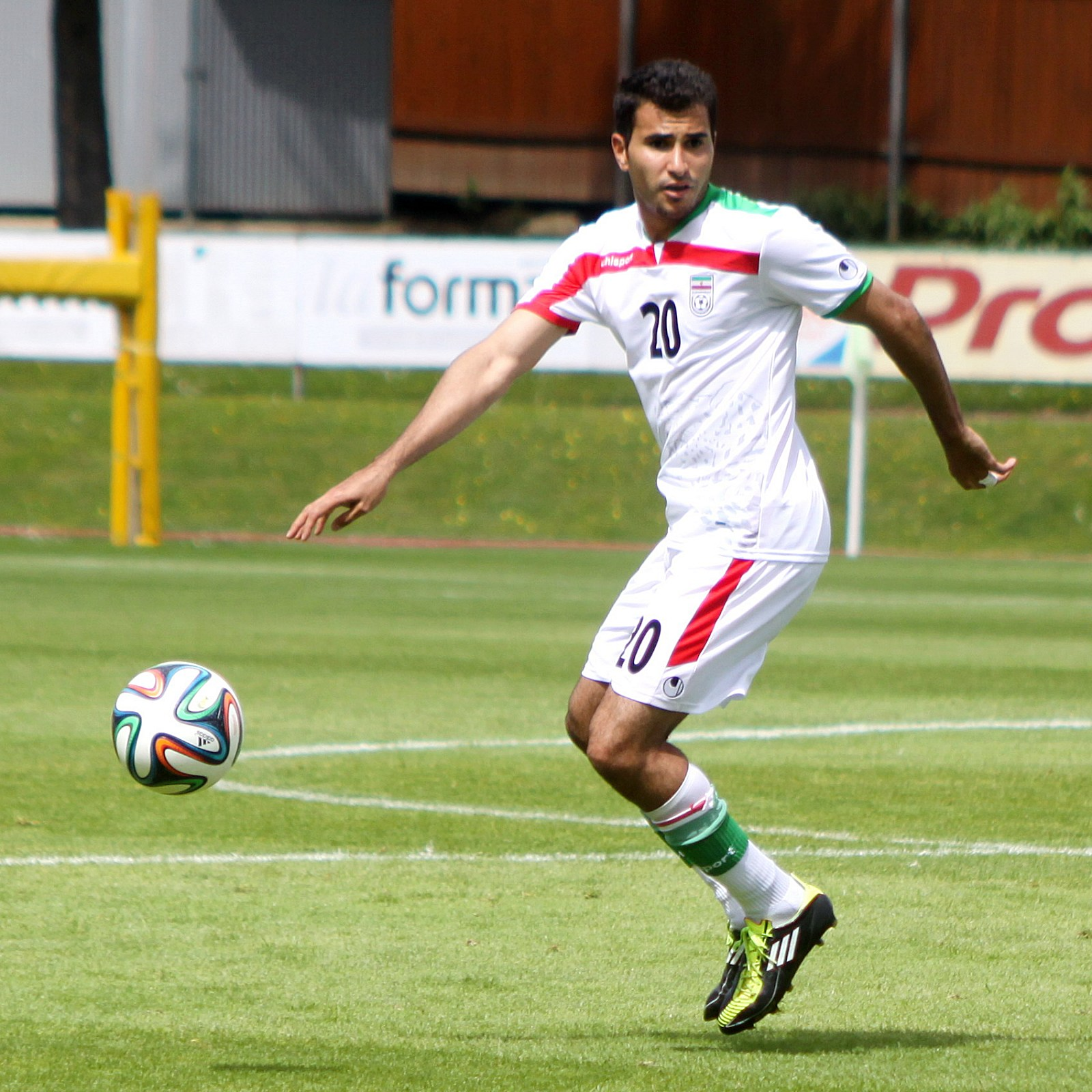
Beitashour playing for Iran in a friendly match against Angola, May 30, 2014

Since Beitashour has Iranian Citizenship through Jus sanguinis principles, he is eligible to play for Iran. Beitashour was born in the United States and is an American citizen; he thus had the choice of either playing for Iran or the United States.

When asked about his choice in a 2012 interview, he stated:

"I think it's a great position to be in to have two options, to say the least... I've just got to keep playing well here [for the San Jose Earthquakes]. I think that's the main thing, and good things will come from that."

Iran national team coach Carlos Queiroz began to recruit eligible players from the Iranian diaspora to reinforce the squad. In June 2012, it was reported that Queiroz was interested in inviting Beitashour.

=== United States ===
Beitashour was called up for an international friendly by the United States national football team against Mexico on August 15, 2012; however, he was an unused substitute.

Coach Jürgen Klinsmann later explained about his "surprise callup":

"Steven has built his case over the last couple of months and talking with Frank Yallop [Beitashour's coach at Earthquakes] and getting his information was the most important step... We are pleased to bring him in. He will be welcomed here and he'll see it is a very positive and comfortable environment where he can settle in with no problems. We are curious to see him in the couple training sessions that we have. It's not much because we have two and a half days to prepare for a game, but obviously I'd love to see him over a longer period of time. It will be curious to get his first impression."

In January 2013, Beitashour participated in another United States national team camp.

=== Iran ===
On October 5, 2013, Beitashour was called up to the Iran national football team by Carlos Queiroz to be part of the preliminary 27-man squad for a 2015 AFC Asian Cup qualification match against Thailand. It was initially unclear whether Beitashour would accept the invitation. Two days later, it was confirmed that Beitashour had accepted the call-up and would join the squad in time for the match on October 15. He made his debut in Iran's 2–1 win over Thailand, coming on as a sub for Mahini in the 76th minute. His first assist came to striker Ghoochannejhad against Thailand in the away leg on November 15, helping to seal their place in the 2015 AFC Asian Cup. On June 1, 2014, Beitashour was named to Iran's 2014 FIFA World Cup squad. He was an unused substitute in all three matches and was not called into Iran's squad for the 2015 Asian Cup.

In May 2018, Beitashour was included in Iran's 35-man preliminary squad for the 2018 FIFA World Cup but was not chosen for the final 23.

== Style of play ==
Beitashour has been praised for his crosses and his ability to get around defenders.

== Outside football ==
=== Sponsorship ===
Beitashour is outfitted by sportswear manufacturer Adidas.

== Post-playing career ==
=== Philanthropy ===
Following his retirement from playing professional soccer, Beitashour announced in December 2023 that he would be running a youth soccer clinic in Denver named Beita Performance Soccer.

=== Managerial career ===
On August 12, 2024, the San Jose Earthquakes announced that Beitashour would be the Quakes Academy's Under-15 head coach for the 2024–25 MLS NEXT season. Under the helm of Beitashour, the Quakes U-15 team went undefeated and achieved first place in their group during his tenure.

On February 7, 2025, Beitashour was announced as the assistant coach of Robin Fraser at Toronto FC ahead of the 2025 season.

== Career statistics ==
=== College ===
Season	Team	League	League		
Season	Team	League	Apps	Goals	Assists
2005	San Diego State Aztecs	Pacific-10 Conference	Redshirt		
2006	San Diego State Aztecs	Pacific-10 Conference	18	0	2
2007	San Diego State Aztecs	Pacific-10 Conference	18	0	3
2008	San Diego State Aztecs	Pacific-10 Conference	4	0	0
2009	San Diego State Aztecs	Pacific-10 Conference	17	0	3
Career Total			57	0	8

=== Senior ===
==== Club ====
As of October 21, 2023

Club	Season	League			Playoffs		Cup^{1}		Continental^{2}		Total	
Club	Season	League	Apps	Goals	Apps	Goals	Apps	Goals	Apps	Goals	Apps	Goals
San Jose Earthquakes	2010	MLS	8	1	0	0	1	0	—		9	1
San Jose Earthquakes	2011	MLS	19	0	—		2	0	—		21	0
San Jose Earthquakes	2012	MLS	33	0	2	0	3	0	—		38	0
San Jose Earthquakes	2013	MLS	27	1	—		0	0	1	0	28	1
San Jose Earthquakes	Total		87	2	2	0	6	0	1	0	96	2
Vancouver Whitecaps FC	2014	MLS	27	0	—		0	0	—		27	0
Vancouver Whitecaps FC	2015	MLS	27	0	2	0	2	0	—		31	0
Vancouver Whitecaps FC	Total		54	0	2	0	2	0	—		58	0
Toronto FC	2016	MLS	29	0	6	0	3	0	—		38	0
Toronto FC	2017	MLS	22	0	5	0	3	0	—		30	0
Toronto FC	Total		51	0	11	0	6	0	—		68	0
Los Angeles FC	2018	MLS	30	2	1	0	3	0	—		34	2
Los Angeles FC	2019	MLS	25	1	0	0	1	0	—		26	1
Los Angeles FC	Total		55	3	1	0	4	0	—		60	3
Colorado Rapids	2020	MLS	0	0	0	0	—		—		0	0
Colorado Rapids	2021	MLS	11	0	0	0	—		—		11	0
Colorado Rapids	2022	MLS	19	0	—		1	0	0	0	20	0
Colorado Rapids	2023	MLS	12	0	—		0	0	0	0	12	0
Colorado Rapids	Total		42	0	0	0	1	0	0	0	43	0
Colorado Rapids 2 (loan)	2022	MLS Next Pro	1	0	—		—		—		1	0
Colorado Rapids 2 (loan)	2023	MLS Next Pro	1	0	—		—		—		1	0
Colorado Rapids 2 (loan)	Total		2	0	0	0	0	0	0	0	2	0
Career total			291	5	16	0	19	0	1	0	327	5

- 1.Includes Lamar Hunt U.S. Open Cup and Canadian Championship.
- 2.Includes CONCACAF Champions League.

== Honors ==
San Jose Earthquakes

- Supporters' Shield: 2012

Vancouver Whitecaps

- Canadian Championship: 2015

Toronto FC

- MLS Cup: 2017
- Supporters' Shield: 2017
- Canadian Championship: 2016, 2017
- Eastern Conference Winners (Playoffs): 2016, 2017

Los Angeles FC

- Supporters' Shield: 2019

Individual

- MLS All-Star: 2012

== See also ==
- Iranian Americans
