= 2010 San Jose Earthquakes season =

San Jose Earthquakes
2010 season
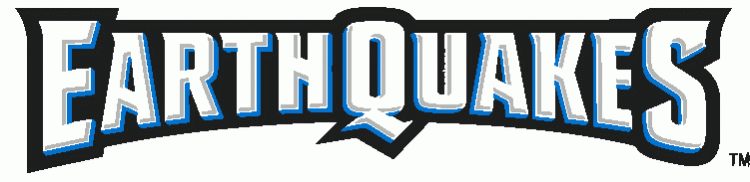
- Owner: Earthquakes Soccer, LLC
- Coach: Frank Yallop
- Stadium: Buck Shaw Stadium
- Major League Soccer: Conference: 6th Overall: 8th
- MLS Cup Playoffs: Conference Finals
- U.S. Open Cup: Did not qualify
- California Clásico: 1st
- Heritage Cup: 2nd
- Top goalscorer: Chris Wondolowski (18)
- Average home league attendance: 9,659
Home colors	Away colors	Third colors

The 2010 San Jose Earthquakes season was the club's thirteenth season of existence. The Earthquakes finished 8th overall in MLS and finished in the Eastern Conference finals of the MLS Cup playoffs before losing to the Colorado Rapids. It was the first season the club made the playoffs since 2005.

To date, this is the furthest the Earthquakes have advanced in the MLS Cup playoffs since the franchise's reactivation in 2008, as the original franchise was transferred to Houston Dynamo in 2006.

== Squad ==
As of October 14, 2010.

Note: Flags indicate national team as defined under FIFA eligibility rules; some limited exceptions apply. Players may hold more than one non-FIFA nationality.

No.	Pos.	Nation	Player
1	GK	USA	Joe Cannon
2	DF	USA	Bobby Burling
3	DF	USA	Chris Leitch
4	MF	USA	Sam Cronin
5	MF	USA	Brad Ring
6	DF	USA	Ike Opara
7	MF	JAM	Khari Stephenson
8	FW	USA	Chris Wondolowski
9	FW	TTO	Scott Sealy
10	MF	ESA	Arturo Álvarez
11	MF	USA	Bobby Convey
12	MF	USA	Ramiro Corrales (captain)
13	FW	TTO	Cornell Glen

No.	Pos.	Nation	Player
14	MF	USA	Brandon McDonald
15	DF	USA	Justin Morrow
17	MF	USA	Joey Gjertsen
18	GK	USA	Jon Busch
19	FW	JAM	Ryan Johnson
20	DF	USA	Tim Ward
21	DF	USA	Jason Hernandez (vice-captain)
22	MF	GAM	Omar Jasseh
23	FW	BRA	Eduardo
25	GK	USA	Brian Edwards
28	MF	BRA	André Luiz
33	DF	USA	Steven Beitashour
77	MF	BRA	Geovanni

=== Management ===
Position	Staff
General Manager	(United States) John Doyle
Head Coach	(Canada) Frank Yallop
Assistant Coach	(United States) Ian Russell
Assistant Coach	(Canada) Mark Watson
Goalkeeper Coach	(New Zealand) Jason Batty
Head trainer	(United States) Bruce Morgan
Equipment manager	(El Salvador) Jose Vega

Last updated: May 2, 2010
Source: San Jose Earthquakes

=== Other information ===
Owner	(United States) Earthquakes Soccer, LLC
Ground (capacity and dimensions)	Buck Shaw Stadium (10,300 / 72x115 yards)

Source: San Jose Earthquakes

== Transfers ==
=== In ===
Date	Position	Nationality	Name	From	Fee	Ref.
February 9, 2010	DF	(Brazil)	Eduardo	FC Basel	Undisclosed	
February 11, 2010	MF	(United States)	Joey Gjertsen	Montreal Impact	Undisclosed	
March 28, 2010	GK	(United States)	Jon Busch	Chicago Fire	Free	
April 2, 2010	FW	(Trinidad and Tobago)	Scott Sealy	Bnei Sakhnin	Free	
April 14, 2010	MF	(The Gambia)	Omar Jasseh		Free	
June 21, 2010	MF	(United States)	Sam Cronin	FC Dordrecht	Trade	
August 6, 2010	DF	(United States)	Tim Ward	Chicago Fire	Trade	
August 11, 2010	MF	(Jamaica)	Khari Stephenson	Aalesunds	Undisclosed	
August 16, 2010	MF	(Brazil)	Geovanni	Hull City	Free	

=== Out ===
Date	Position	Nationality	Name	To	Fee	Ref.
November 27, 2009	MF	(United States)	Shea Salinas	Philadelphia Union	Expansion Draft	
April 7, 2010	FW	(United States)	Quincy Amarikwa	Colorado Rapids	Trade	
November 24, 2010	GK	(United States)	Joe Cannon	Vancouver Whitecaps FC	Expansion Draft	
November 24, 2010	MF	(El Salvador)	Arturo Alvarez	Portland Timbers	Expansion Draft	

=== Loans in ===
Date from	Position	Nationality	Name	From	Date to	Ref.
March 1, 2010	MF	(Argentina)	Javier Robles	Club Olimpo	August 2, 2010	

=== Loans out ===
Date from	Position	Nationality	Name	To	Date to	Ref.

=== Released ===
Date	Position	Nationality	Name	Joined	Date
July 1, 2010	MF	(El Salvador)	Ramón Sánchez	Águila	
December 3, 2010	FW	(Brazil)	Geovanni	Vitória	January 30, 2011
December 3, 2010	FW	(Brazil)	Eduardo	Brasil de Farroupilha	
December 3, 2010	FW	(Trinidad and Tobago)	Cornell Glen	Caledonia AIA	April 18, 2011

== Review ==
=== Preseason ===
For the second straight year, the Earthquakes played at PDL team Fresno Fuego. The Quakes trained in London for ten days and went 3–0 against fellow MLS side Colorado Rapids and the reserve teams of West Ham United and Tottenham Hotspur. San Jose will also have a game against the Houston Dynamo in San Francisco on March 17 and a home game on March 20 against future MLS rival Portland Timbers.

=== March ===
San Jose will begin its thirteenth Major League Soccer regular season at home with a match against Real Salt Lake on March 27, 2010, followed by a road match against the Chicago Fire on April 10, 2010.

=== May ===
The Quakes tallied four straight shutouts and a 393-minute scoreless streak, which ended with a 3–1 home loss to Toronto F.C. on May 29.

=== October ===
With a win October 9 over D.C. United, the Earthquakes clinched their first trip to the postseason since 2005.

== Friendlies ==
February 27, 2010	Fresno Fuego	2–3	San Jose Earthquakes	Fresno, California
7:00pm PST	Ferreira, 82'; Jovanovic, 88'	Report	Convey, 31'; Robles, 38'; Jessey, 53'	Stadium: Chukchansi Park; Attendance: 2,500

March 8, 2010	West Ham United XI	0–2	San Jose Earthquakes	East Ham, London, England
		Report	Jordan Spence, 8' (o.g.); Johnson, 50'	Stadium: Boleyn Ground; Attendance: NA

March 10, 2010	Tottenham Hotspur XI	0–1	San Jose Earthquakes	Chigwell, London, England
2 p.m. GMT		Report	Burling, 51'	Stadium: Spurs Lodge; Attendance: NA

March 12, 2010	San Jose Earthquakes	2–0	Colorado Rapids	Chigwell, London, England
2 p.m. GMT	Johnson, 10'; Amarikwa, 84'	Report		Stadium: Spurs Lodge; Attendance: NA

March 17, 2010	San Jose Earthquakes	0–0	Houston Dynamo	San Francisco, United States
7:00pm PDT		Report		Stadium: Kezar Stadium; Attendance: 2,116

March 20, 2010	San Jose Earthquakes	1–1	Portland Timbers	Santa Clara, California
7:00pm PDT	Glen, 71'	Report	Thompson, 80'	Stadium: Buck Shaw Stadium; Attendance: 3,152

July 17, 2010	San Jose Earthquakes	0–0	Tottenham Hotspur	Buck Shaw Stadium, Santa Clara
1:00pm PT		Report		Attendance: 10,721

== Competitions ==
=== Major League Soccer ===
==== Regular season ====
===== League table =====
====== Conference ======
Pos	Team	Pld	W	L	T	GF	GA	GD	Pts	Qualification
1	LA Galaxy	30	18	7	5	44	26	+18	59	Qualification for the conference semifinals
2	Real Salt Lake	30	15	4	11	45	20	+25	56	Qualification for the conference semifinals
3	FC Dallas	30	12	4	14	42	28	+14	50	Qualification for the conference semifinals
4	Seattle Sounders FC	30	14	10	6	39	35	+4	48	Qualification for the conference semifinals
5	Colorado Rapids	30	12	8	10	44	32	+12	46	Qualification for the conference semifinals
6	San Jose Earthquakes	30	13	10	7	34	33	+1	46	Qualification for the conference semifinals
7	Houston Dynamo	30	9	15	6	40	49	−9	33	
8	Chivas USA	30	8	18	4	31	45	−14	28	

Source: MLS

====== Overall ======
Pos	Team	Pld	W	L	T	GF	GA	GD	Pts	
1	LA Galaxy (S)	30	18	7	5	44	26	+18	59	Qualification for the CONCACAF Champions League
2	Real Salt Lake	30	15	4	11	45	20	+25	56	
3	New York Red Bulls	30	15	9	6	38	29	+9	51	
4	FC Dallas	30	12	4	14	42	28	+14	50	Qualification for the CONCACAF Champions League
5	Columbus Crew	30	14	8	8	40	34	+6	50	
6	Seattle Sounders FC (U)	30	14	10	6	39	35	+4	48	Qualification for the CONCACAF Champions League
7	Colorado Rapids (C)	30	12	8	10	44	32	+12	46	Qualification for the CONCACAF Champions League
8	San Jose Earthquakes	30	13	10	7	34	33	+1	46	
9	Kansas City Wizards	30	11	13	6	36	35	+1	39	
10	Chicago Fire	30	9	12	9	37	38	−1	36	
11	Toronto FC (V)	30	9	13	8	33	41	−8	35	Qualification for the CONCACAF Champions League
12	Houston Dynamo	30	9	15	6	40	49	−9	33	
13	New England Revolution	30	9	16	5	32	50	−18	32	
14	Philadelphia Union	30	8	15	7	35	49	−14	31	
15	Chivas USA	30	8	18	4	31	45	−14	28	
16	D.C. United	30	6	20	4	21	47	−26	22	

Source: MLS
Rules for classification: 1) points; 2) head-to-head record; 3) goal difference; 4) number of goals scored
(C) MLS Cup champions; (S) Supporters' Shield winners; (U) U.S. Open Cup winners; (V) Canadian Championship winners

===== Results summary =====
Overall								Home						Away					
Pld	Pts	W	L	T	GF	GA	GD	W	L	T	GF	GA	GD	W	L	T	GF	GA	GD
30	46	13	10	7	34	33	+1	7	5	3	17	14	+3	6	5	4	17	19	−2

Last updated: October 24, 2010
Source: Results
Pld = Matches played; Pts = Points; W = Matches won; T = Matches tied; L = Matches lost; GF = Goals for; GA = Goals against; GD = Goal difference

===== Results by matchday =====
Round	1	2	3	4	5	6	7	8	9	10	11	12	13	14	15	16	17	18	19	20	21	22	23	24	25	26	27	28	29	30
Stadium	H	A	H	A	H	H	A	A	H	H	A	A	H	A	A	H	A	H	H	A	A	H	H	A	H	A	A	H	H	A
Result	L	W	W	L	W	W	T	W	L	T	L	T	T	W	T	L	L	W	W	L	W	T	W	W	L	T	W	L	W	L
Position	15	11	5	9	5	4	4	3	4	5	6	7	7	7	7	7	8	7	6	6	6	7	6	6	8	8	7	8	7	8

Updated to match(es) played on October 24, 2010. Source: Results and League table
A = Away; H = Home; W = Win; L = Loss; T = Tie

===== Results =====
March 27, 2010 1	San Jose Earthquakes	0–3	Real Salt Lake	Santa Clara
18:00 PDT (UTC−7)	McDonald (yellow card) 58'; Leitch (red card) 53'; Opara (yellow card) 90'	Report	Morales 14', 54'; Espindola 27'; Grabavoy (yellow card) 39'; Olave (yellow card) 65'	Stadium: Buck Shaw Stadium; Attendance: 10,589; Referee: Jorge González

April 10, 2010 2	Chicago Fire	1–2	San Jose Earthquakes	Bridgeview
17:30 PDT (UTC−7)	Pappa 52'	Report	Luiz (yellow card) 28'; Alvarez 49'; Opara 82'	Stadium: Toyota Park; Attendance: 20,276; Referee: Mark Geiger

April 17, 2010 3	San Jose Earthquakes	2–0	New England Revolution	Santa Clara
19:00 PDT (UTC−7)	Wondolowski 57'; Opara 71'	Report	Niouky (yellow card) 16'	Stadium: Buck Shaw Stadium; Attendance: 9,082; Referee: Elias Bazakos

April 24, 2010 4	Chivas USA	3–2	San Jose Earthquakes	Carson
19:30 PDT (UTC−7)	Kljestan 25'; Trujillo (yellow card) 35'; Braun 54'; Borja (yellow card) 82'; Chijindu 87'	Report	Wondolowski 41' (yellow card) 73'; Jasseh (yellow card) 66'; Beitashour 90+3'	Stadium: Home Depot Center; Attendance: 14,389; Referee: Edvin Jurisevic

May 1, 2010 5	San Jose Earthquakes	1–0	Colorado Rapids	Santa Clara
19:00 PDT (UTC−7)	Wondolowski 33'; Convey (yellow card) 87'; Leitch (yellow card) 90+3'	Report	Thompson (yellow card) 90+4'	Stadium: Buck Shaw Stadium; Attendance: 8,674; Referee: Baldomero Toledo

May 8, 2010 6	San Jose Earthquakes	4–0	New York Red Bulls	Santa Clara
19:00 PDT (UTC−7)	Convey (yellow card) 43'; Johnson 44'; Gjertsen 54'; Wondolowski 77'; Burling 85'	Report	Tchani (yellow card) 4'; Sassano (red card) 13'	Stadium: Buck Shaw Stadium; Attendance: 9,711; Referee: Andrew Chapin

May 15, 2010 7	New England Revolution	0–0	San Jose Earthquakes	Foxborough
15:00 PDT (UTC−7)	Niouky (yellow card) 39'	Report	Corrales (yellow card) 20'	Stadium: Gillette Stadium; Attendance: 13,611; Referee: Terry Vaughn

May 22, 2010 8	Seattle Sounders FC	0–1	San Jose Earthquakes	Seattle
12:00 PDT (UTC−7)		Report	Wondolowski 11'; Johnson (yellow card) 35'; Convey (yellow card) 78'	Stadium: Qwest Field; Attendance: 35,953; Referee: Alex Prus

May 29, 2010 9	San Jose Earthquakes	1–3	Toronto	Santa Clara
19:00 PDT (UTC−7)	Burling (yellow card) 58'; Corrales 76'; Convey (yellow card) 89'	Report	Šarić (yellow card) 8'; Barrett 31' (yellow card) 31'; DeRosario 66', 90+4' de Guzman (yellow card) 90+3'	Stadium: Buck Shaw Stadium; Attendance: 10,214; Referee: Jorge González

June 2, 2010 10	San Jose Earthquakes	2–2	Columbus Crew	Santa Clara
19:00 PDT (UTC−7)	Alvarez 6'; Wondolowski (yellow card) 40' (goal) 79'; Burling (yellow card) 43'	Report	Gaven 5'; Zayner (yellow card) 55'; Brunner (yellow card) 62'; Marshall 70'	Stadium: Buck Shaw Stadium; Attendance: 8,033; Referee: Jasen Anno

June 5, 2010 11	Dallas	2–0	San Jose Earthquakes	Frisco
17:30 PDT (UTC−7)	Shea 58', 60'; John (yellow card) 66'	Report	Wondolowski 11'; Johnson (yellow card) 35'; Convey (yellow card) 78'	Stadium: Pizza Hut Park; Attendance: 14,331; Referee: Edvin Jurisevic

June 25, 2010 12	Real Salt Lake	0–0	San Jose Earthquakes	Sandy
18:00 PDT (UTC−7)	Campos (yellow card) 87'	Report	Corrales (yellow card) 58'; Busch (yellow card) 60'	Stadium: Rio Tinto Stadium; Attendance: 16,216; Referee: Silviu Petrescu

July 3, 2010 13	San Jose Earthquakes	1–1	D.C. United	Santa Clara
19:00 PDT (UTC−7)	Opara 16'	Report	Najar 54'	Stadium: Buck Shaw Stadium; Attendance: 10,304; Referee: David Gantar

July 10, 2010 14	Philadelphia Union	1–2	San Jose Earthquakes	Chester
15:00 PDT (UTC−7)	Fred 14' (yellow card) 52'	Report	Glen 45'; Wondolowski (yellow card) 69'; Alvarez 90'; Corrales (yellow card) 90+3'	Stadium: PPL Park; Attendance: 17,158; Referee: Abiodun Okulaja

July 22, 2010 15	LA Galaxy	2–2	San Jose Earthquakes	Carson
19:30 PDT (UTC−7)	Buddle 59'; Donovan (yellow card) 70' (goal) 90'; Franklin (yellow card) 89'; Juninho (yellow card) 90+3'	Report	Convey 2'; Burling (yellow card) 53'; McDonald 72'	Stadium: Home Depot Center; Attendance: 17,712; Referee: Jair Marrufo

July 31, 2010 16	San Jose Earthquakes	0–1	Seattle Sounders FC	Santa Clara
19:00 PDT (UTC−7)	Cronin (yellow card) 15'; Corrales (yellow card) 80'	Report	Montero 26'; Alonso (yellow card) 90+1'	Stadium: Buck Shaw Stadium; Attendance: 10,351; Referee: Edvin Jurisevic

August 7, 2010 17	Colorado Rapids	1–0	San Jose Earthquakes	Commerce City
18:00 PDT (UTC−7)	Busch 25' (o.g.)	Report		Stadium: Dick's Sporting Goods Park; Attendance: 12,701; Referee: Hilario Grajeda

August 14, 2010 18	San Jose Earthquakes	1–0	Kansas City Wizards	Santa Clara
19:00 PDT (UTC−7)	Convey (yellow card) 24'; Wondolowski 35'; Hernandez (red card) 88'	Report	Conrad (yellow card) 66'	Stadium: Buck Shaw Stadium; Attendance: 8,619; Referee: Jasen Anno

August 21, 2010 19	San Jose Earthquakes	1–0	LA Galaxy	Santa Clara
13:00 PDT (UTC−7)	Wondolowski 4'; Alvarez (yellow card) 54'	Report	Gonzalez (yellow card) 48'	Stadium: Buck Shaw Stadium; Attendance: 10,799; Referee: Terry Vaughn

August 28, 2010 20	New York Red Bulls	2–0	San Jose Earthquakes	Harrison
16:30 PDT (UTC−7)	Richards (yellow card) 38' (goal) 45'; Henry 63'; Lindpere (yellow card) 75'; Tchani (yellow card) 81'	Report	Burling (yellow card) 6'; Convey (yellow card) 56'	Stadium: Red Bull Arena; Attendance: 21,859; Referee: Silviu Petrescu

September 5, 2010 21	Houston Dynamo	1–2	San Jose Earthquakes	Houston
17:30 PDT (UTC−7)	Davis 45+2'; Robinson (yellow card) 66'	Report	Stephenson 6'; Hernandez (yellow card) 41'; Glen (yellow card) 45+1'; Geovanni 64'; Cronin (red card) 84'	Stadium: Robertson Stadium; Attendance: 15,073; Referee: Jorge González

September 11, 2010 22	San Jose Earthquakes	0–0	Dallas	Santa Clara
19:00 PDT (UTC−7)	Eduardo (yellow card) 88'	Report	Alexander (yellow card) 42'	Stadium: Buck Shaw Stadium; Attendance: 10,342; Referee: Ricardo Salazar

September 15, 2010 23	San Jose Earthquakes	1–0	Philadelphia Union	Santa Clara
19:00 PDT (UTC−7)	Wondolowski 69'; Convey (yellow card) 90'; Alvarez (yellow card) 90+3'	Report	Jacobson (yellow card) 20'	Stadium: Buck Shaw Stadium; Attendance: 8,109; Referee: Silviu Petrescu

September 25, 2010 24	Toronto	2–3	San Jose Earthquakes	Toronto
13:00 PDT (UTC−7)	De Rosario 66' (yellow card) 80'; Maicon 79'	Report	Wondolowski 3', 53', 67'; Busch (yellow card) 84'	Stadium: BMO Field; Attendance: 20,064; Referee: Kevin Stott

September 29, 2010 25	San Jose Earthquakes	0–3	Chicago Fire	Santa Clara
20:00 PDT (UTC−7)	Geovanni (yellow card) 75'	Report	Kinney 39'; Król (yellow card) 50'; Ljungberg 72'; Nyarko 90+2'	Stadium: Buck Shaw Stadium; Attendance: 9,829; Referee: Abiodun Okulaja

October 2, 2010 26	Columbus Crew	0–0	San Jose Earthquakes	Columbus
16:30 PDT (UTC−7)		Report	Johnson (yellow card) 38'	Stadium: Columbus Crew Stadium; Attendance: 10,867; Referee: Jorge González

October 9, 2010 27	D.C. United	0–2	San Jose Earthquakes	Washington, D.C.
16:30 PDT (UTC−7)	Moreno (red card) 8'	Report	Stephenson (yellow card) 3'; McDonald (red card) 8'; Wondolowski 45', 55'	Stadium: RFK Stadium; Attendance: 14,822; Referee: Alex Prus

October 16, 2010 28	San Jose Earthquakes	0–1	Houston Dynamo	Santa Clara
19:00 PDT (UTC−7)	Cronin (yellow card) 35'; Busch (yellow card) 87'	Report	Hainault 23'	Stadium: Buck Shaw Stadium; Attendance: 10,597; Referee: Michael Kennedy

October 20, 2010 29	San Jose Earthquakes	3–0	Chivas USA	Santa Clara
19:00 PDT (UTC−7)	Burling (yellow card) 28'; Wondolowski 55', 59', 72'	Report	Umaña (yellow card) 29'	Stadium: Buck Shaw Stadium; Attendance: 9,633; Referee: Ricardo Salazar

October 23, 2010 30	Kansas City Wizards	4–1	San Jose Earthquakes	Kansas
17:30 PDT (UTC−7)	Diop 36', 60', 76'; Eduardo 90+2' (o.g.)	Report	Wondolowski 70'	Stadium: CommunityAmerica Ballpark; Attendance: 11,518; Referee: Jorge González

==== Playoffs ====
October 30, 2010 Conference Semifinal	San Jose Earthquakes	0–1	New York Red Bulls	Santa Clara
19:00 PDT (UTC−7)	Wondolowski (yellow card) 65'	Report	Ballouchy (yellow card) 45+2'; Lindpere 56'; Miller (yellow card) 71'; Coundoul (yellow card) 83'	Stadium: Buck Shaw Stadium; Attendance: 10,525; Referee: Paul Ward

November 4, 2010 Conference Semifinal	New York Red Bulls	1–3 (2–3 agg.)	San Jose Earthquakes	Harrison
17:00 PST (UTC−8)	Ángel 78'	Report	Convey 6', 76'; Corrales (yellow card) 32'; Busch (yellow card) 81'; Wondolowski 81'	Stadium: Red Bull Arena; Attendance: 22,839; Referee: Mark Geiger

November 13, 2010 Conference Final	Colorado Rapids	1–0	San Jose Earthquakes	Commerce City
18:30 PST (UTC−8)	Kimura 42'	Report		Stadium: Dick's Sporting Goods Park; Attendance: 17,779; Referee: Jorge González

=== U.S. Open Cup ===
==== Qualification ====
April 14, 2010 Qualification Semifinal	San Jose Earthquakes	3–3 (a.e.t.) (3–5 p)	Real Salt Lake	Santa Clara
19:00 PDT (UTC−7)	Beitashour (yellow card) 51'; Leitch 68'; Álvarez 88'; Morrow 103'; Burling (yellow card) 109'	Report	Findley 7'; Johnson (yellow card) 8'; González 60'; Beckerman (yellow card) 89'; Borchers 118'	Stadium: Buck Shaw Stadium; Attendance: 2,718; Referee: Alejandro Mariscal
	Penalties
	(penalty missed) Álvarez; (penalty scored) Gjertsen; (penalty scored) McDonald; (penalty scored) Sánchez		Johnson (penalty scored); Beckerman (penalty scored); Findley (penalty scored); Russell (penalty scored); Williams (penalty scored)

== Squad statistics ==
As of match played November 13, 2010

=== Appearances and goals ===
No.	Pos	Nat	Player	Total		MLS		Playoff		U.S. Open Cup	
No.	Pos	Nat	Player	Apps	Goals	Apps	Goals	Apps	Goals	Apps	Goals
1	GK	(United States) USA	Joe Cannon	12	0	12	0	0	0	0	0
2	DF	(United States) USA	Bobby Burling	19	1	16+2	1	0	0	1	0
3	DF	(United States) USA	Chris Leitch	17	1	15	0	1	0	1	1
4	MF	(United States) USA	Sam Cronin	20	0	16+1	0	3	0	0	0
5	MF	(United States) USA	Brad Ring	11	0	4+7	0	0	0	0	0
6	DF	(United States) USA	Ike Opara	11	3	10+1	3	0	0	0	0
7	MF	(Jamaica) JAM	Khari Stephenson	13	1	11	1	0+2	0	0	0
8	FW	(United States) USA	Chris Wondolowski	32	19	26+2	18	3	1	1	0
9	FW	(Trinidad and Tobago) TTO	Scott Sealy	18	0	5+10	0	3	0	0	0
10	MF	(El Salvador) ESA	Arturo Álvarez	23	4	11+8	3	0+3	0	0+1	1
11	MF	(United States) USA	Bobby Convey	31	3	28	1	3	2	0	0
12	MF	(United States) USA	Ramiro Corrales	23	1	18+2	1	2	0	1	0
13	FW	(Trinidad and Tobago) TTO	Cornell Glen	22	1	10+11	1	0	0	1	0
14	MF	(United States) USA	Brandon McDonald	33	1	28+1	1	3	0	1	0
15	DF	(United States) USA	Justin Morrow	3	1	0+2	0	0	0	1	1
17	MF	(United States) USA	Joey Gjertsen	19	1	16+2	1	0	0	1	0
18	GK	(United States) USA	Jon Busch	22	0	18	0	3	0	1	0
19	FW	(Jamaica) JAM	Ryan Johnson	30	1	19+8	1	3	0	0	0
20	DF	(United States) USA	Tim Ward	16	0	12+1	0	3	0	0	0
21	DF	(United States) USA	Jason Hernandez	30	0	27	0	3	0	0	0
22	MF	(The Gambia) GAM	Omar Jasseh	5	0	0+4	0	0	0	0+1	0
23	FW	(Brazil) BRA	Eduardo	12	0	2+6	0	0+3	0	0+1	0
28	MF	(Brazil) BRA	André Luiz	9	0	9	0	0	0	0	0
33	DF	(United States) USA	Steven Beitashour	9	1	7+1	1	0	0	0+1	0
77	MF	(Brazil) BRA	Geovanni	15	1	8+4	1	3	0	0	0
Players away from San Jose Earthquakes on loan:
Players who left San Jose Earthquakes during the season:
7	MF	(El Salvador) ESA	Ramón Sánchez	4	0	1+2	0	0	0	1	0
30	MF	(Argentina) ARG	Javier Robles	3	0	1+1	0	0	0	1	0
	FW	(United States) USA	Quincy Amarikwa	2	0	0+1	0	0	0	1	0

=== Goal scorers ===
Place	Position	Nation	Number	Name	MLS	Playoff	U.S. Open Cup	Total
1	FW	(United States)	8	Chris Wondolowski	18	1	0	19
2	MF	(El Salvador)	10	Arturo Álvarez	3	0	1	4
3	MF	(United States)	11	Bobby Convey	1	2	0	3
3	DF	(United States)	6	Ike Opara	3	0	0	3
5	DF	(United States)	33	Steven Beitashour	1	0	0	1
5	FW	(Jamaica)	19	Ryan Johnson	1	0	0	1
5	MF	(United States)	17	Joey Gjertsen	1	0	0	1
5	DF	(United States)	2	Bobby Burling	1	0	0	1
5	DF	(United States)	12	Ramiro Corrales	1	0	0	1
5	FW	(Trinidad and Tobago)	13	Cornell Glen	1	0	0	1
5	MF	(United States)	14	Brandon McDonald	1	0	0	1
5	MF	(Jamaica)	7	Khari Stephenson	1	0	0	1
5	MF	(Brazil)	77	Geovanni	1	0	0	1
5	DF	(United States)	3	Chris Leitch	0	0	1	1
5	DF	(United States)	15	Justin Morrow	0	0	1	1
Total					34	3	3	40

=== Disciplinary record ===
Position	Nation	Number	Name	MLS		Playoffs		U.S. Open Cup		Total	
Position	Nation	Number	Name	Yellow card	Red card	Yellow card	Red card	Yellow card	Red card	Yellow card	Red card
2	(United States)	DF	Bobby Burling	5	0	0	0	1	0	6	0
3	(United States)	DF	Chris Leitch	1	1	0	0	0	0	1	1
4	(United States)	MF	Sam Cronin	2	1	0	0	0	0	2	1
6	(United States)	DF	Ike Opara	1	0	0	0	0	0	1	0
7	(Jamaica)	MF	Khari Stephenson	1	0	0	0	0	0	1	0
8	(United States)	FW	Chris Wondolowski	3	0	1	0	0	0	4	0
10	(El Salvador)	MF	Arturo Álvarez	2	0	0	0	0	0	2	0
11	(United States)	MF	Bobby Convey	8	0	0	0	0	0	8	0
12	(United States)	MF	Ramiro Corrales	4	0	1	0	0	0	5	0
13	(Trinidad and Tobago)	FW	Cornell Glen	1	0	0	0	0	0	1	0
14	(United States)	MF	Brandon McDonald	1	1	0	0	0	0	1	1
18	(United States)	GK	Jon Busch	3	0	1	0	0	0	4	0
19	(Jamaica)	FW	Ryan Johnson	3	0	0	0	0	0	3	0
21	(United States)	DF	Jason Hernandez	1	1	0	0	0	0	1	1
22	(The Gambia)	MF	Omar Jasseh	1	0	0	0	0	0	1	0
23	(Brazil)	FW	Eduardo	1	0	0	0	0	0	1	0
28	(Brazil)	MF	André Luiz	1	0	0	0	0	0	1	0
33	(United States)	DF	Steven Beitashour	0	0	0	0	1	0	1	0
77	(Brazil)	MF	Geovanni	1	0	0	0	0	0	1	0
Total				40	4	3	0	2	0	45	4
