= Sebastián Fernández =

Sebastián Fernández may refer to:

- Sebastián Fernández (footballer, born 1985), Uruguayan footballer
- Sebastián Fernández (footballer, born 1989), Uruguayan footballer
- Sebastián Fernández (golfer) (born 1973), Argentine golfer
- Sebastián Fernández (racing driver) (born 2000), Venezuelan racing driver
- Sebastián Fernández (rower), Argentine rower
- Sebastián Fernández (volleyball) (born 1978), Argentine volleyball player
