= Pedro Morales (footballer) =

Chilean footballer (born 1985)

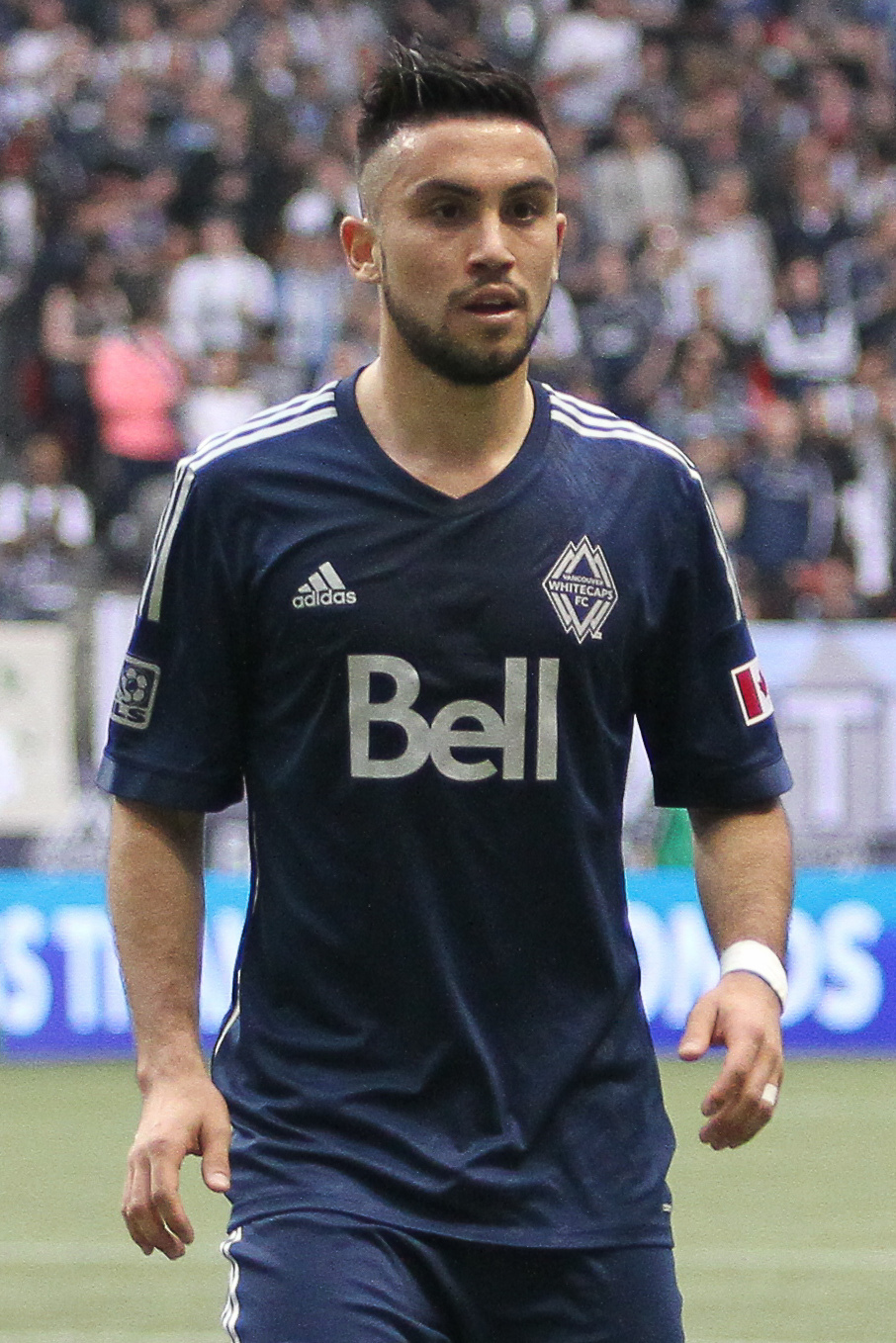
- Morales playing for Vancouver Whitecaps FC in 2015

Personal information
- Full name: Pedro Andrés Morales Flores
- Date of birth: 25 May 1985 (age 41)
- Place of birth: Hualpén, Chile
- Height: 1.81 m (5 ft 11 in)
- Position: Midfielder

Youth career
- Huachipato

Senior career*
Years	Team	Apps	(Gls)
2004–2007	Huachipato	88	(15)
2007–2008	Universidad de Chile	40	(15)
2008–2013	Dinamo Zagreb	60	(24)
2012	→ Universidad de Chile (loan)	16	(1)
2013	→ Málaga (loan)	7	(3)
2013–2014	Málaga	15	(1)
2014–2016	Vancouver Whitecaps	86	(25)
2017	Colo-Colo	7	(1)
2018	Universidad de Concepción	13	(0)
2019	Deportes Temuco	5	(0)
Total		337	(85)

International career
2005	Chile U20	10	(2)
2008–2010	Chile	12	(3)
- * Club domestic league appearances and goals

Pedro Andrés Morales Flores (born 25 May 1985) is a Chilean former footballer who played as a midfielder.

He began his professional career with Huachipato before moving to Universidad de Chile, and in 2007 was signed by Dinamo Zagreb of Croatia. After a loan back at Universidad de Chile and Spanish club Málaga, he spent a season with the latter before moving to Vancouver Whitecaps FC, where he served as a captain from 2014 until his departure.

Morales first represented Chile in the 2005 FIFA World Youth Championship, making his senior international debut later in 2008.

== Club career ==
=== Chile ===
Morales began his career with Huachipato in 2004, quickly developing into an important player for the club. His outstanding performance in the U-20 World Cup helped Morales make the switch from Huachipato to Universidad de Chile, one of Chile's oldest and most popular clubs. He made his debut in the summer of 2007, right before the Chilean Clausura tournament. His presence, quick feet and leadership skills allowed him to regularly play alongside Chile's top national team scorer, ex Juventus and Lazio center forward, Marcelo Salas. Morales finished the 5-month tournament as the second top scorer in the league with 13 goals.

=== Dinamo Zagreb and Málaga ===
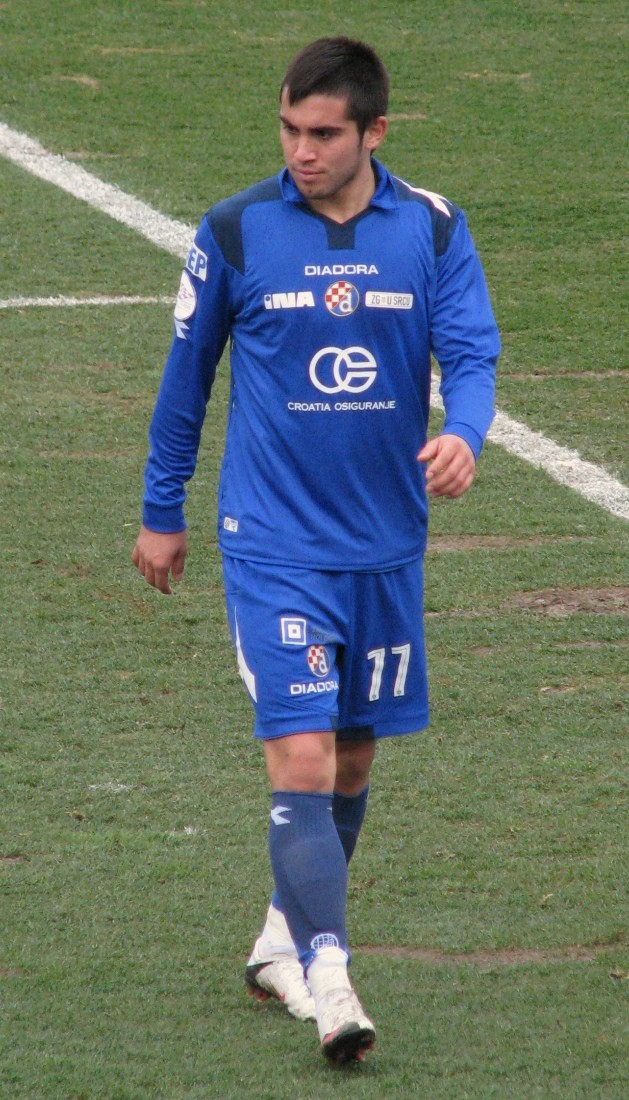
Morales with Dinamo Zagreb in 2010

Morales signed a five-year contract with GNK Dinamo Zagreb on 11 June 2008. After a first season of average performances, in his second season he established himself as one of Dinamo's main players. During his time at Dinamo he helped the club to three straight league titles.

After disappointing performances and injury problems, Dinamo loaned Morales to Universidad de Chile. He regained his best form in Chile helping Universidad in capturing the 2012 Apertura which led to another loan, back to Europe where he joined Málaga CF. On 11 June 2013, he signed a two-year contract with Málaga.

=== Vancouver Whitecaps FC ===
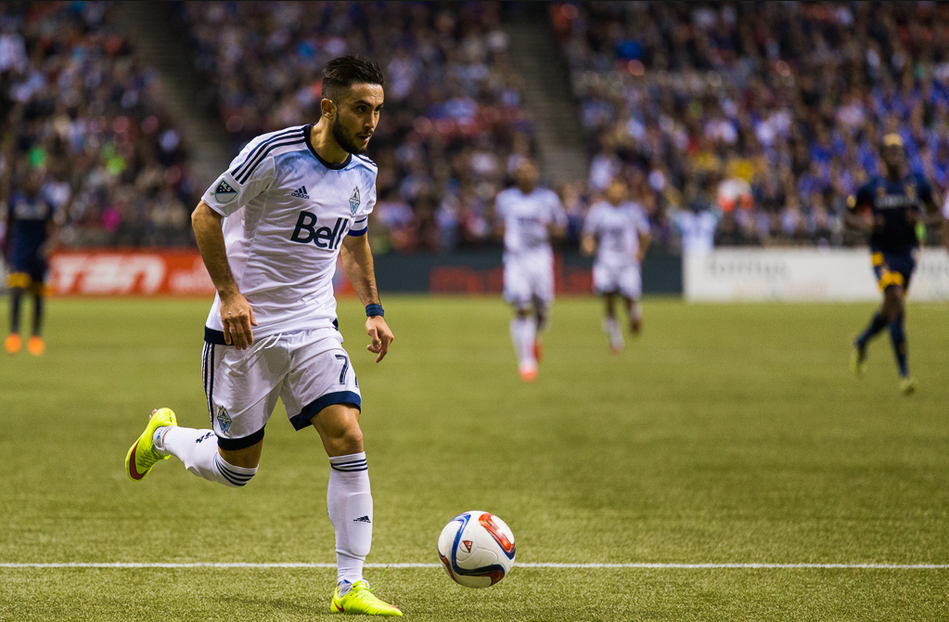
Morales playing for Vancouver Whitecaps FC in 2014

On 5 March 2014 Morales was acquired by the Vancouver Whitecaps FC in Major League Soccer, for €300,000. He was signed as the club's third Designated Player, after Kenny Miller and Matías Laba. He made his debut four days later, assisting the third goal and scoring the fourth in a 4–1 win over reigning Supporters' Shield champions the New York Red Bulls at BC Place. Vancouver finished fifth in the Western Conference, and lost to fourth-place FC Dallas in the knockout round for the MLS Cup Playoffs. Morales scored 10 goals in 34 matches, in addition to 12 assists, winning the MLS Newcomer of the Year Award.

Morales left the Whitecaps on 7 December 2016. He left the team as the second top scorer of the Whitecaps with 25 goals behind Camilo Sanvezzo and leads with assists of 22.

=== Colo-Colo ===
In January 2017, Morales signed with Chilean club Colo-Colo on a free transfer.

== International career ==
In January 2008, Morales was called up to the Chile national team by Marcelo Bielsa. The tour consisted of 2 friendlies where Chile beat South Korea 1–0 in Seoul and had a goalless draw with Japan at the Nissan Stadium. Morales played the full 90 minutes in both encounters.

A month later, Morales was called up to represent Chile in the prestigious 8-team, U23 Toulon tournament in France. He was chosen the 2nd best player of the tournament and scored what was voted as the tournament's best goal, thanks to a strike from the behind the half in a semifinal against Côte d'Ivoire. Morales's size, technique, goals, and assists allowed Chile to make it to the final where they conceded a 1–0 loss to Italy, in a highly contested encounter where Morales was able to rid himself of all nearby defenders and shoot a 25-yard rocket that hit the Italian post in the dying minutes of the game.

=== International goals ===
#	Date	Venue	Opponent	Score	Result	Competition
1.	5 May 2010	Tierra de Campeones, Iquique, Chile	Trinidad and Tobago	1–0	2–0	Friendly
2.	9 October 2010	Sheikh Zayed Stadium, Abu Dhabi, United Arab Emirates	United Arab Emirates	0–2	0–2	Friendly
3.	12 October 2010	Sultan Qaboos Sports Complex, Muscat, Oman	Oman	0–1	0–1	Friendly

== Post-retirement ==
Morales became a football agent by joining Empire Football Agency in March 2025.

== Honours ==
Dinamo Zagreb

- Prva HNL: 2008–09, 2009–10, 2010–11
- Croatian Football Cup: 2008–09, 2010–11
- Croatian Football Super Cup: 2010

Universidad de Chile

- Chilean Primera División: 2012
- Copa Chile: 2012−13

Vancouver Whitecaps FC

- Canadian Championship: 2015

Individual

- MLS Newcomer of the Year Award: 2014
- Vancouver Whitecaps FC Player of the Year: 2014
