= Javier Robles =

Argentine footballer

Personal information
- Full name: Javier Sebastián Robles
- Date of birth: January 18, 1985 (age 41)
- Place of birth: Buenos Aires, Argentina
- Height: 1.71 m (5 ft 7 1/2 in)
- Position: Midfielder

Team information
- Current team: Comerciantes Unidos

Senior career*
Years	Team	Apps	(Gls)
2006	Vélez Sársfield	15	(0)
2007	Santiago Wanderers	11	(0)
2007–2010	Olimpo	38	(3)
2009–2010	→ Vélez Sársfield (loan)	1	(0)
2010	San Jose Earthquakes	2	(0)
2011	Iraklis	6	(0)
2011–2012	Deportivo Cuenca	20	(0)
2012–2013	Almirante Brown	8	(1)
2013–2014	Gimnasia Concepción	20	(3)
2014–2015	Sarmiento Resistencia	11	(1)
2015	San José	11	(2)
2015	UTC	10	(1)
2016–2017	Cultural Santa Rosa	34	(2)
2018–2019	Juan Aurich	19	(1)
2019–	Comerciantes Unidos	10	(0)
- * Club domestic league appearances and goals as of 14 May 2015

Javier Sebastián Robles (born January 18, 1985, in Buenos Aires) is an Argentine footballer currently playing for Comerciantes Unidos in the Peruvian Segunda División.

== Career ==
Robles spent the majority of his early career in South America, playing for Vélez Sársfield and Club Olimpo in his native Argentina, and for Santiago Wanderers in Chile.

=== San Jose Earthquakes ===
On March 1, 2010, the San Jose Earthquakes officially announced the signing of Robles after he trialed with the club in the offseason. He was released by the club on August 2, 2010.

=== Iraklis ===
On January 7, 2011, Robles signed a contract with Greek club Iraklis until the summer of 2012. He debuted for Iraklis on 23 January 2011, as he came on for Carlinhos as a half-time substitute in a 3–0 away defeat by AO Kavala.
