= Omar Jasseh =

Gambian footballer

Personal information
- Full name: Omar Jasseh
- Date of birth: 1 November 1992 (age 34)
- Place of birth: Banjul, the Gambia
- Height: 5 ft 7 in (1.70 m)
- Position: Midfielder

Youth career
- Maccassa
- Samder
- 2006: Charlton Athletic
- 2007: Chelsea
- 2008: Crystal Palace

Senior career*
Years	Team	Apps	(Gls)
2010–2011	San Jose Earthquakes	5	(0)
2012	Mjölby Södra	8	(5)
2014	Kajaani	5	(0)
- * Club domestic league appearances and goals as of 26 July 2016

Omar Jasseh (born 1 November 1992 in Banjul) is a Gambian footballer currently without a club.

== Career ==
Jasseh began playing in academies at the age of 12 in his native Gambia. He played for Maccassa and Samger, before spending three years in England with youth academies at Charlton Athletic, Chelsea and Crystal Palace. Crystal Palace then went on to offer him a contract but was unable to complete the accord because of visa restrictions.

Jasseh went to the United States in 2009 and trained with Toronto FC, before signing with the Major League Soccer side San Jose Earthquakes on 14 April 2010. This made him the youngest player to sign with the team in franchise history.

Jasseh made his professional debut on 24 April 2010 in a match against Chivas USA. During his stint in San Jose Jasseh missed much time with his team due to national team duty. Jasseh went on to help his team qualify for the Orange African Youth Championship defeating Ivory Coast in a home and away tie. Jasseh was not happy with the lack of opportunity for first team football so he asked to be released so he could explore other options. The management agreed, as the move would also open an international player roster spot and thus Jasseh was waived by the Earthquakes on 19 July 2011, during the summer transfer period.
