= Matías Laba =

Argentine footballer

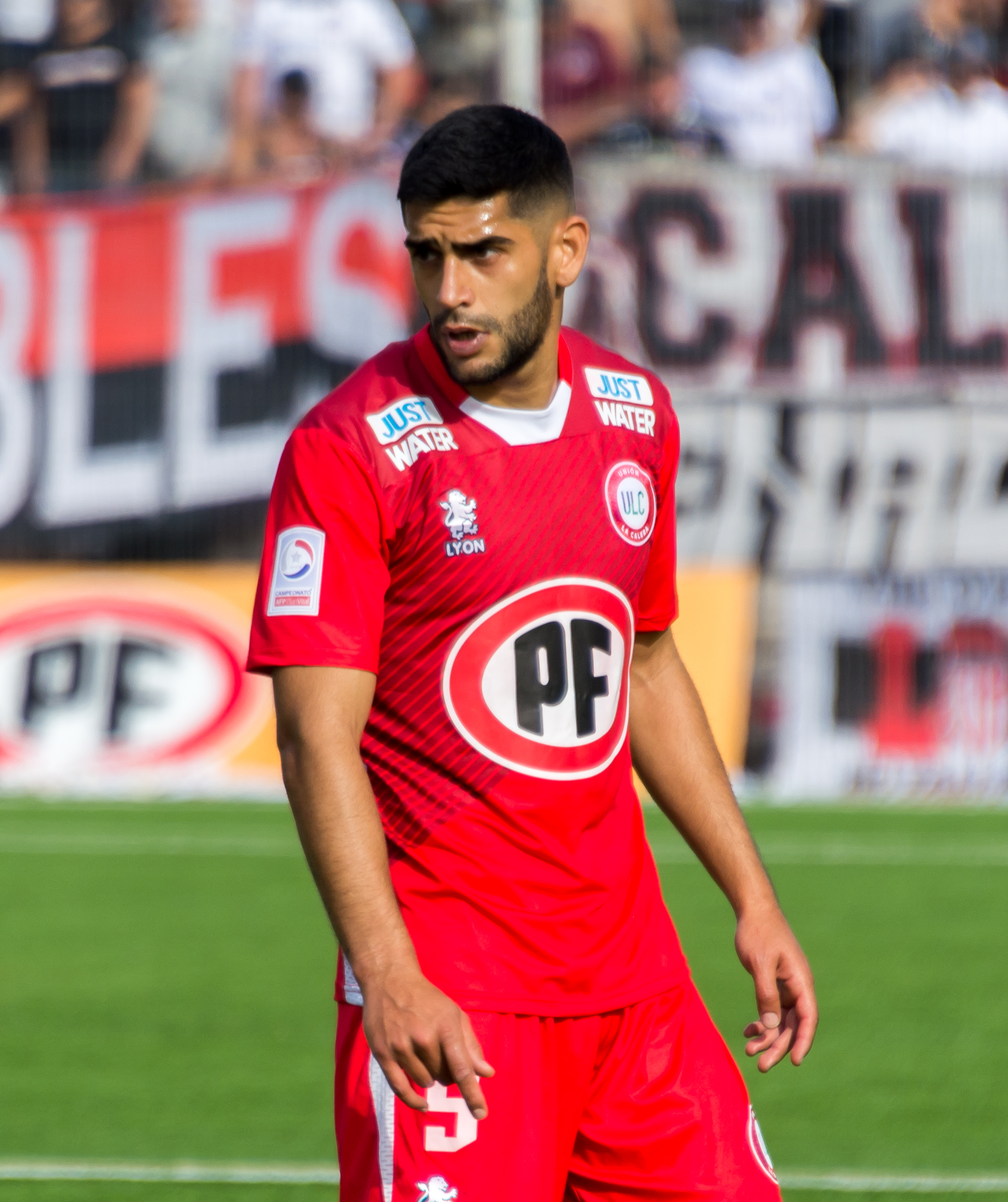
- Laba with Unión La Calera in 2019

Personal information
- Full name: Matías Alejandro Laba
- Date of birth: 11 December 1991 (age 34)
- Place of birth: Villa Raffo, Argentina
- Height: 1.75 m (5 ft 9 in)
- Position: Defensive midfielder

Team information
- Current team: San Telmo

Youth career
- Argentinos Juniors

Senior career*
Years	Team	Apps	(Gls)
2010–2013	Argentinos Juniors	62	(0)
2013	Toronto FC	17	(1)
2014–2017	Vancouver Whitecaps FC	113	(3)
2018	Estudiantes LP	1	(0)
2019–2020	Unión La Calera	23	(1)
2020	Defensa y Justicia	1	(0)
2020–2021	Unión La Calera	39	(0)
2022–2023	Central Córdoba SdE	13	(0)
2023–2024	Barracas Central	2	(0)
2024–2026	Defensores de Belgrano	43	(0)
2026–	San Telmo	7	(0)

International career
2011	Argentina U20	5	(0)
- * Club domestic league appearances and goals as of 16:57, 6 May 2026 (UTC)

Matías Alejandro Laba (born 11 December 1991) is an Argentine footballer who plays as a midfielder for San Telmo.

== Club career ==
Laba started his professional career playing for Argentinos Juniors in the 2011 Clausura, coming on as a second-half substitute in a 1–1 draw with Vélez Sársfield. During his first season with the first team, he played a total 14 league games, plus another 4 in the 2011 Copa Libertadores.

After weeks of speculation, it was officially announced on 26 April 2013 that Laba had signed with Toronto FC as a young designated player, the transfer fee was undisclosed but believed to be in the range of $1.5 million. Laba made his debut for Toronto in a 1–0 away loss to Colorado Rapids on 4 May 2013. Laba scored his first goal with Toronto on 4 August 2013, in the second minute of the match against New England Revolution, the match ended in a 1–0 away victory.

After the signings of Designated Players Jermain Defoe, Michael Bradley, and Gilberto, Toronto was above the league limit of three DPs, and were forced to move Laba. On 25 February 2014, Laba was traded by Toronto to the Vancouver Whitecaps FC for future considerations.

Laba scored his first goal for Vancouver in a Voyageurs Cup match vs. FC Edmonton, tucking away the loose ball after a goal mouth scramble. His first MLS goal with Vancouver came against Portland Timbers on 18 July 2015. Collecting the ball from midfield, the defense applied no pressure to Laba, allowing him to fire a shot into the bottom corner from 25 yards. He also led MLS in successful tackles in the 2014 season. In April 2017, Laba gave Vancouver Whitecaps a 4–2 victory over LA Galaxy after scoring the last two goals of the match.

On 26 January 2018, Laba signed with Argentine Primera División side Estudiantes.

In 2019, he joined Unión La Calera in the Chilean Primera División, making a total of 26 appearances, including four matches in the Copa Sudamericana.

In January 2020, he returned to the Argentine top tier, signing with Defensa y Justicia.

In November 2020, he returned to Unión La Calera. He left the club at the end of January 2022, after signing with Argentine club Central Córdoba SdE.

== International career ==
In July 2011, Laba was selected to represent the Argentina national under-20 football team at the FIFA U-20 World Cup.

== Honours ==
Argentinos Juniors

- Argentine Primera División: Clausura 2010

Argentina

- Pan American Games Runner-up: 2011

Vancouver Whitecaps FC

- Canadian Championship: 2015
