= Sebastián Fernández (footballer, born 1989) =

Uruguayan footballer

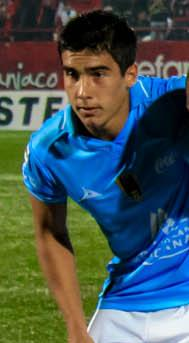

Personal information
- Full name: Sebastián Mauricio Fernández Presa
- Date of birth: 15 November 1989 (age 36)
- Place of birth: Montevideo, Uruguay
- Height: 1.75 m (5 ft 9 in)
- Positions: Second striker; striker

Team information
- Current team: Sportivo Bella Italia

Youth career
- Miramar Misiones

Senior career*
Years	Team	Apps	(Gls)
2008–2011	Miramar Misiones	66	(27)
2012	Danubio	14	(4)
2012–2013	San Luis	13	(2)
2013–2014	Chiapas	0	(0)
2013–2014	→ Universitario (loan)	26	(5)
2014–2015	Boston River	0	(0)
2014	→ Vancouver Whitecaps FC (loan)	30	(5)
2015	→ Necaxa (loan)	3	(0)
2015	Danubio	6	(0)
2016	Liverpool	4	(1)
2016–2017	Deportivo Pasto	8	(0)
2017	Zamora	13	(1)
2018	Villa Española	2	(0)
2018	Racing	10	(2)
2019–2021	San Lorenzo	44	(15)
2023–2024	Cerrito	16	(2)
2024–	Sportivo Bella Italia	0	(0)
- * Club domestic league appearances and goals as of 25 March 2024

Sebastián Mauricio Fernández Presa (born 15 November 1989) is a Uruguayan footballer who plays as a forward or attacking midfielder for Sportivo Bella Italia.

== Club career ==
Fernández started his professional career playing for Miramar Misiones in 2008. In his four years at the club, the striker scored 27 goals in 66 league appearances. In February 2012, he was transferred to Uruguayan giants Danubio F.C. playing 6 months in the Uruguayan Primera División. In the top division, he scored 4 goals in 14 matches. On 8 June 2012, he signed with Liga MX side San Luis F.C. On 28 December 2012, he was transferred to Peruvian club Universitario de Deportes. While with Universitario, Fernández helped the club capture the 2013 Peruvian First Division title. In 26 appearances with the club he scored 5 goals.

On 5 February 2014, Fernández was acquired on loan by Vancouver Whitecaps FC of the Major League Soccer. In his debut match, the Whitecaps' season opener on 8 March 2014, he made the club's starting 11 and scored the team's second goal against New York Red Bulls, winning Man of the Match honours.

Fernández signed with San Lorenzo for the 2019 season.

In March 2024, Fernández joined Uruguayan Primera División Amateur club Sportivo Bella Italia.

== Honours ==
=== Club ===
Universitario de Deportes

- Torneo Descentralizado (1): 2013
