= 2016 Vancouver Whitecaps FC season =

Vancouver Whitecaps FC 2016 soccer season

Vancouver Whitecaps FC
2016 season
- Chairman: John Furlong
- Head coach: Carl Robinson
- Stadium: BC Place (Capacity: 22,120)
- Major League Soccer: Conference: 8th Overall: 16th
- MLS Cup Playoffs: Did not qualify
- Canadian Championship: Runner-up
- CONCACAF Champions League: Quarterfinals
- Cascadia Cup: 1st
- Top goalscorer: League: Pedro Morales (8); All: Pedro Morales (9)
- Highest home attendance: 27,038 (April 2 vs. LA Galaxy)
- Lowest home attendance: 18,836 (April 27 vs. Sporting KC)
- Average home league attendance: 22,220 (13 games)
Home colours	Away colours

The 2016 Vancouver Whitecaps FC season was the Whitecaps' sixth season in Major League Soccer, the top tier of soccer in the United States and Canada.

== Season overview ==
Competition	Starting round	Final position	Record							
Competition	Starting round	Final position	Pld	W	D	L	GF	GA	GD	Win %
Major League Soccer	Matchday 1	8th, west; 16th, overall	34	10	9	15	45	52	−7	29.41
Canadian Championship	Semifinals	Runner-up	4	2	0	2	5	4	+1	50.00
CONCACAF Champions League	Group stage	Semi-finals	8	5	1	2	17	7	+10	62.50
Total			46	17	10	19	67	63	+4	36.96

Source: Competitions

== Roster ==
As of July 11, 2016

No.	Player	Nationality	Position	Date of birth (age)	Previous club
Goalkeepers
1	David Ousted	DEN	GK	February 1, 1985 (age 41)	Randers FC
24	Marco Carducci	CAN	GK	September 26, 1996 (age 30)	Vancouver Whitecaps FC Residency
70	Paolo Tornaghi	Italy	GK	June 21, 1988 (age 38)	Chicago Fire
Defenders
2	Jordan Harvey	United States	DF	January 28, 1984 (age 42)	Philadelphia Union
4	Kendall Waston	CRC	DF	January 1, 1988 (age 38)	Deportivo Saprissa
6	Jordan Smith	CRC	DF	April 23, 1991 (age 35)	Deportivo Saprissa
8	Fraser Aird	CAN	DF	February 2, 1995 (age 31)	Rangers
14	Cole Seiler	United States	DF	February 5, 1994 (age 32)	Georgetown Hoyas
18	David Edgar	CAN	DF	May 19, 1987 (age 39)	Birmingham City
22	Christian Dean	United States	DF	March 14, 1993 (age 33)	California Golden Bears
26	Tim Parker	United States	DF	February 23, 1993 (age 33)	St. John's Red Storm
33	Marcel de Jong	CAN	DF	October 15, 1986 (age 40)	Ottawa Fury
44	Pa Modou Kah	NOR	DF	July 30, 1980 (age 46)	Portland Timbers
46	Brett Levis	CAN	DF	May 29, 1993 (age 33)	Whitecaps FC 2
Midfielders
7	Christian Bolaños	CRC	MF	May 17, 1984 (age 42)	Deportivo Saprissa
11	Nicolás Mezquida	URU	MF	January 21, 1992 (age 34)	Fénix
13	Cristian Techera	URU	MF	May 31, 1992 (age 34)	River Plate Montevideo
15	Matias Laba	ARG	MF	December 11, 1991 (age 34)	Toronto FC
17	Andrew Jacobson	United States	MF	September 25, 1985 (age 41)	New York City FC
30	Ben McKendry	CAN	MF	March 25, 1993 (age 33)	Vancouver Whitecaps FC Residency
31	Russell Teibert	CAN	MF	December 22, 1992 (age 33)	Vancouver Whitecaps (USSF-D2)
32	Marco Bustos	CAN	MF	April 22, 1996 (age 30)	Vancouver Whitecaps FC Residency
38	Kianz Froese	CAN	MF	April 16, 1996 (age 30)	Vancouver Whitecaps FC Residency
67	Alphonso Davies	CAN	MF	November 2, 2000 (age 26)	Whitecaps FC 2
77	Pedro Morales	CHI	MF	May 25, 1985 (age 41)	Málaga CF
Forwards
9	Masato Kudo	JPN	FW	May 6, 1990 (age 36)	Kashiwa Reysol
19	Erik Hurtado	United States	FW	May 11, 1990 (age 36)	Santa Clara
23	Kekuta Manneh	GAM	FW	December 30, 1994 (age 31)	Austin Aztex
27	Blas Pérez	PAN	FW	March 13, 1981 (age 45)	FC Dallas
28	Giles Barnes	JAM	FW	August 5, 1988 (age 38)	Houston Dynamo

=== Transfers ===
==== In ====
No.	Pos.	Player	Transferred from	Fee/notes	Date	Ref.
19	FW	(United States) Erik Hurtado	(Norway) Mjøndalen	Loan Return	December 1, 2015	
9	FW	(Japan) Masato Kudo	(Japan) Kashiwa Reysol	Free Transfer	December 29, 2015	
13	MF	(Uruguay) Cristian Techera	(Uruguay) River Plate Montevideo	Undisclosed fee after successful loan spell	January 6, 2016	
20	MF	(Honduras) Deybi Flores	(Honduras) C.D. Motagua	Undisclosed fee after successful loan spell	January 18, 2016	
7	MF	(Costa Rica) Christian Bolaños	(Costa Rica) Deportivo Saprissa	Undisclosed Fee	January 20, 2016	
8	DF	(Canada) Fraser Aird	(Scotland) Rangers	Loan	January 29, 2016	
14	DF	(United States) Cole Seiler	(United States) Georgetown Hoyas	Selected in 2016 MLS SuperDraft	February 8, 2016	
27	FW	(Panama) Blas Pérez	(United States) FC Dallas	Traded in exchange for Mauro Rosales	February 16, 2016	
17	MF	(United States) Andrew Jacobson	(United States) New York City FC	Traded in exchange for targeted allocation money	March 11, 2016	
18	DF	(Canada) David Edgar	(England) Birmingham City	Free Transfer	July 11, 2016	
33	MF	(Canada) Marcel De Jong	(Canada) Ottawa Fury FC	Free Transfer	July 11, 2016	
67	MF	(Canada) Alphonso Davies	(Canada) Whitecaps FC 2	Signed as a Homegrown Player	July 15, 2016	
	FW	(Argentina) Fabián Espíndola	(United States) D.C. United	Acquired in exchange for General Allocation Money	July 20, 2016	
28	FW	(Jamaica) Giles Barnes	(United States) Houston Dynamo	Acquired in exchange for General Allocation Money and right of refusal for Keyner Brown	July 30, 2016	
46	DF	(Canada) Brett Levis	(Canada) Whitecaps FC 2	Free Transfer	August 23, 2016	

==== Out ====
Pos.	Player	Transferred to	Fee/notes	Date	Ref.
DF	(Uruguay) Diego Rodríguez	(Uruguay) Juventud	Loan return	December 1, 2015	
FW	(Canada) Caleb Clarke	(Germany) SpVgg Unterhaching	Option declined	December 1, 2015	
MF	(Jamaica) Andre Lewis	(United States) Portland Timbers 2	Option declined	December 1, 2015	
DF	(South Africa) Ethen Sampson		Option declined	December 1, 2015	
FW	(Wales) Robert Earnshaw	Retired	Out of contract, later retired	December 1, 2015	
MF	(Argentina) Mauro Rosales	(United States) FC Dallas	Out of contract, later traded to FC Dallas for Blas Pérez	December 1, 2015	
DF	(Iran) Steven Beitashour	(Canada) Toronto FC	Traded to Toronto FC for second-highest 2016 second round Superdraft pick	December 18, 2015	
MF	(Ghana) Gershon Koffie	(United States) New England Revolution	Traded to New England for general and targeted allocation money	February 11, 2016	
FW	(Jamaica) Darren Mattocks	(United States) Portland Timbers	Traded to Portland for general and targeted allocation money and a 2017 International Roster Spot	March 14, 2016	
FW	(Uruguay) Octavio Rivero	(Chile) Colo-Colo	Undisclosed Fee	July 6, 2016	
DF	(Canada) Sam Adekugbe	(England) Brighton and Hove Albion	Year long Loan	July 15, 2016	
FW	(Argentina) Fabián Espíndola	(Mexico) Club Necaxa	Undisclosed Fee	July 26, 2016	
MF	(Honduras) Deybi Flores	(Honduras) C.D. Motagua	Loan	August 9, 2016	

=== Technical staff ===
Role	Name	Nation
Head coach	Carl Robinson	WAL
Assistant coach	Gordon Forest	SCO
Assistant Coach	Martyn Pert	ENG
Head of scouting and analysis	Daniel Stenz	Germany
Goalkeeper coach	Marius Røvde	NOR
Physiotherapist	Graeme Poole	CAN

=== Management ===
Role	Name	Nation
Executive chair	John Furlong	IRE
President	Bob Lenarduzzi	CAN
Chief operating officer	Rachel Lewis	CAN
Vice-president of finance and administration	Don Ford	CAN

== Major League Soccer ==
=== Preseason ===
February 3, 2016	Seattle Sounders FC	1–2	Whitecaps FC	Tucson, Arizona, U.S.
16:00 (PST)	Jones 76'; Lowe (yellow card) 85'	Report	Aird (yellow card) 30'; Mattocks 51' (pen.), 90'	Stadium: Kino Grandstand Field

February 6, 2016	New England Revolution	2–3	Whitecaps FC	Tucson, Arizona, U.S.
15:30 (PST)	Davies 42'; McCrary 66'; Phillips (yellow card) 74'	Report	Waston (yellow card) 24'; Kudo 31'; Bustos (yellow card) 33'; Flores 53'; Manneh 67'; Rivero (yellow card) 89'	Stadium: Kino Grandstand Field

February 9, 2016	Houston Dynamo	0–2	Whitecaps FC	Tucson, Arizona, U.S.
17:00 (PST)	Wenger (yellow card) 6'; Williams (yellow card) 33'; Olabiyi (yellow card) 76'	Report	Froese (yellow card) 94'; Bustos (yellow card) 96', (goal) 98'; Ibeagha 118' (o.g.)	Stadium: Kino Grandstand Field

Simple Invitational

February 21, 2016	Chicago Fire	3–2	Whitecaps FC	Portland, Oregon, U.S.
14:30 (PST)	Goossens 5'; Gilberto (yellow card) 36', (goal) 51' (pen.); Igboananike 81' (pen.); Fernandez (yellow card) 86'	Report	Kappelhof 24' (o.g.); Flores (yellow card) 33'; Techera 38'; Waston (yellow card) 78'	Stadium: Providence Park

February 24, 2016	Portland Timbers	0–2	Whitecaps FC	Portland, Oregon, U.S.
17:30 (PST)		Report	Kah (yellow card) 24'; Pérez 38'; Rivero 72'	Stadium: Providence Park; Attendance: 14,208

February 27, 2016	Whitecaps FC	3–1	Minnesota United FC	Portland, Oregon, U.S.
14:30 (PST)	Pedro Morales 13', 41' (pen.), (yellow card) 87'; Rivero 32'; Froese (yellow card) 43' (yellow-red card) 62'	Report	Venegas (red card) 48'; Lowe 49'	Stadium: Providence Park

Pos	Team	GP	W	L	D	GF	GA	GD	Pts
1	Chicago Fire	3	3	0	0	9	2	+7	9
2	Vancouver Whitecaps FC	3	2	1	0	7	4	+3	6
3	Portland Timbers	3	1	2	0	4	4	0	3
4	Minnesota United FC	3	0	3	0	1	11	-10	0

=== Regular season ===
==== League tables ====
===== Western Conference =====
Pos	Team	Pld	W	L	T	GF	GA	GD	Pts	Qualification
6	Real Salt Lake	34	12	12	10	44	46	−2	46	Qualification for the knockout round
7	Portland Timbers	34	12	14	8	48	53	−5	44	
8	Vancouver Whitecaps FC	34	10	15	9	45	52	−7	39	
9	San Jose Earthquakes	34	8	12	14	32	40	−8	38	
10	Houston Dynamo	34	7	14	13	39	45	−6	34	

Source: MLS

===== Overall =====
Pos	Team	Pld	W	L	T	GF	GA	GD	Pts
14	New England Revolution	34	11	14	9	44	54	−10	42
15	Orlando City SC	34	9	11	14	55	60	−5	41
16	Vancouver Whitecaps FC	34	10	15	9	45	52	−7	39
17	San Jose Earthquakes	34	8	12	14	32	40	−8	38
18	Columbus Crew SC	34	8	14	12	50	58	−8	36

Source: MLS
Rules for classification: 1) points; 2) total wins; 3) total goal differential; 4) total goals scored;

==== Results ====
Overall								Home						Away					
Pld	Pts	W	L	D	GF	GA	GD	W	L	D	GF	GA	GD	W	L	D	GF	GA	GD
34	39	10	15	9	45	52	−7	6	5	6	28	22	+6	4	10	3	17	30	−13

Last updated: October 23, 2016
Pld = Matches played; Pts = Points; W = Matches won; T = Matches tied; L = Matches lost; GF = Goals for; GA = Goals against; GD = Goal difference

Round	1	2	3	4	5	6	7	8	9	10	11	12	13	14	15	16	17	18	19	20	21	22	23	24	25	26	27	28	29	30	31	32	33	34
Ground	H	A	A	H	H	A	A	H	H	A	H	H	A	A	H	H	A	A	H	H	H	A	A	A	H	A	A	H	A	A	H	H	A	H
Result	L	L	W	W	D	L	L	W	D	L	W	W	W	L	D	L	W	L	D	W	D	D	L	L	L	L	D	L	W	L	D	L	D	W

Updated to match(es) played on October 23, 2016. Source:
A = Away; H = Home; W = Win; D = Draw; L = Loss

March 6, 2016 1	Whitecaps FC	2–3	Montreal Impact	Vancouver
14:30 (PST)	Harvey 45'; Bolaños (yellow card) 62'; Aird (yellow card) 77'; Waston 90+3'	report	Piatti 19', 88'; Oduro 42'; Oyongo (yellow card) 45'	Stadium: BC Place; Attendance: 22,120; Referee: Ismail Elfath

March 12, 2016 2	Sporting Kansas City	2–1	Whitecaps FC	Kansas City
17:30 (PST)	Dwyer 5', 41'; Quintillà (yellow card) 51'	report	Rivero (yellow card) 36'; Waston (yellow card) 38'; Smith (red card) 45+1'; Morales 70' (pen.)	Stadium: Children's Mercy Park; Attendance: 20,718; Referee: Edvin Jurisevic

March 19, 2016 3 Cascadia Cup	Seattle Sounders FC	1–2	Whitecaps FC	Seattle
19:00 PDT	Ivanschitz (yellow card) 44', (goal) 52'; Mears (yellow card) 71'; Marshall (yellow card) 73'	report	Morales 10' (pen.), 74' (pen.), (yellow card) 51'; Rivero (yellow card) 35'; Pérez (yellow card) 82'	Stadium: CenturyLink Field; Attendance: 40,012; Referee: Mark Geiger

March 26, 2016 4	Whitecaps FC	1–0	Houston Dynamo	Vancouver
19:00 PDT	Morales 23' (pen.); Laba (yellow card) 76'; Kah (yellow card) 90+2'	report		Stadium: BC Place; Attendance: 22,120; Referee: David Gantar

April 2, 2016 5	Whitecaps FC	0–0	LA Galaxy	Vancouver
19:00 PDT	Laba (red card) 28'	report	Steres (yellow card) 17'; Van Damme (yellow card) 24'	Stadium: BC Place; Attendance: 27,038; Referee: Jair Marrufo

April 9, 2016 6	D.C. United	4–0	Whitecaps FC	Washington
14:30 PDT	Espindola 39', 54'; Franklin (yellow card) 70'; Saborio 88', 90+1'	report	Froese (yellow card) 65'	Stadium: RFK Stadium; Attendance: 14,088; Referee: Jorge Gonzalez

April 16, 2016 7	Real Salt Lake	1–0	Whitecaps FC	Sandy, Utah
19:00 PDT	Martínez 55'; Beckerman (yellow card) 71'	report	Waston (yellow card) 79'; Rivero (yellow card) 90+2'	Stadium: Rio Tinto Stadium; Attendance: 19,720; Referee: Ismail Elfath

April 23, 2016 8	Whitecaps FC	3–0	FC Dallas	Vancouver
19:30 PDT	Figueroa 35' (o.g.); Harvey 63'; Rivero (yellow card) 72'; Manneh 77'; Pérez (yellow card) 80'	report	Urruti (yellow card) 20'; Zimmerman (yellow card) 37'	Stadium: BC Place; Attendance: 22,120; Referee: Silviu Petrescu

April 27, 2016 9	Whitecaps FC	1–1	Sporting Kansas City	Vancouver
19:30 PDT	Bolaños 14'; Waston (yellow card) 40' (red card) 51'	report	Belser (yellow card) 22'; Rubio 27', (yellow card) 41'; Coelho (yellow card) 60'	Stadium: BC Place; Attendance: 18,836; Referee: Armando Villarreal

April 30, 2016 10	New York City FC	3–2	Whitecaps FC	New York, New York
13:00 PDT	Villa 35', 41'; Lopez (yellow card) 47'; Mendoza 73'; Brillant (yellow card) 80'; Matarrita (yellow card) 90+4'	report	Rivero 1'; Bolaños 63'; Kah (yellow card) 90+4'	Stadium: Yankee Stadium; Attendance: 25,438; Referee: Sorin Stoica

May 7, 2016 11 Cascadia Cup	Whitecaps FC	2–1	Portland Timbers	Vancouver
14:00 PDT	Morales (yellow card) 11'; Waston (yellow card) 16'; Kudo 60'; Bolaños 66'; Pérez (yellow card) 69'	report	Borchers 34'; Nagbe (yellow card) 70'; Chara (yellow card) 90+2'	Stadium: BC Place; Attendance: 22,120; Referee: Kevin Stott

May 11, 2016 12	Whitecaps FC	2–1	Chicago Fire	Vancouver
19:00 PDT	Pérez 36', 89'; Waston (yellow card) 82'	report	Igboananike 62'	Stadium: BC Place; Attendance: 19,638; Referee: Baldomero Toledo

May 14, 2016 13	Toronto FC	3–4	Whitecaps FC	Toronto, Ontario
16:30 PDT	Giovinco 37', 66', (yellow card) 90+5'; Moor 80'	report	Manneh 12', 70'; Bolaños 18'; Kah (yellow card) 35'; Aird (yellow card) 63' (red card) 76'; Morales 72'; Pérez (yellow card) 89'	Stadium: BMO Field; Attendance: 24,748; Referee: Robert Sibiga

May 22, 2016 14 Cascadia Cup	Portland Timbers	4–2	Whitecaps FC	Portland, Oregon
13:30 PDT	Valeri 4' (pen.); Mcinerney 29', (yellow card) 41'; Asprilla 78' (pen.); Nagbe 82'	report	Hurtado (yellow card) 30'; Parker (yellow card) 46'; Manneh 49'; Morales (yellow card) 80', (goal) 84' (pen.); Harvey (yellow card) 81'; Waston (red card) 90+5'	Stadium: Providence Park; Attendance: 21,144; Referee: Ted Unkel

May 28, 2016 15	Whitecaps FC	1–1	Houston Dynamo	Vancouver
15:00 PDT	Smith (yellow card) 22'; Teibert (yellow card) 30'; Morales (red card) 42'; Rivero 52'; Laba (yellow card) 67'	report	Beasley 20'; Alex (red card) 42'; García (yellow card) 51'; Wenger (yellow card) 69'	Stadium: BC Place; Attendance: 22,120; Referee: Drew Fischer

June 18, 2016 16	Whitecaps FC	1–2	New England Revolution	Vancouver
16:00 PDT	Smith (yellow card) 35'; Jacobson (yellow card) 36'; Mezquida 41'; Laba (yellow card) 82'	report	Woodberry 31', (yellow card) 40'; Rowe 55'; Gonçalves (yellow card) 88'	Stadium: BC Place; Attendance: 22,120; Referee: Ismail Elfath

June 25, 2016 17	Philadelphia Union	2–3	Whitecaps FC	Chester, Pennsylvania
16:00 PDT	Alberg 14'; Barnetta (yellow card) 36'; Pontius 90+4'	report	Jacobson 19'; Manneh 41', (yellow card) 51'; Bolaños 84'	Stadium: Talen Energy Stadium; Attendance: 17,225; Referee: Armando Villarreal

July 4, 2016 18	LA Galaxy	2–0	Whitecaps FC	Carson, California
19:30 PDT	Keane 12'; Larentowicz 47'; de Jong (red card) 74'	Report	Laba (yellow card) 67'	Stadium: StubHub Center; Attendance: 27,167; Referee: Robert Sibiga

July 9, 2016 19	Whitecaps FC	2–2	Colorado Rapids	Vancouver
19:00 PDT	Waston 10'; Techera 87' (pen.)	Report	Watts (yellow card) 37'; Gashi (yellow card) 56'; Doyle 59'; Miller (red card) 71'; Pappa (yellow card) 74'; Sjoberg 90+4'	Stadium: BC Place; Attendance: 22,120; Referee: Allen Chapman

July 13, 2016 20	Whitecaps FC	2–0	Real Salt Lake	Vancouver
19:30 PDT	Jacobson; (yellow card) 25'; Glad 34' (o.g.); Techera 37'; Waston (yellow card) 54'; de Jong (yellow card) 89'	Report	Allen (yellow card) 13'; Beltran (yellow card) 28'; Mulholland (yellow card) 59'; García (yellow card) 74'	Stadium: BC Place; Attendance: 22,120; Referee: Jose Carlos Rivero

July 16, 2016 21	Whitecaps FC	2–2	Orlando City SC	Vancouver
19:00 PDT	Mezquida 35'; Kudo 43'; Jacobson (yellow card) 90+2'	Report	Baptista 14'; Larin 50'; Carrasco (yellow card) 69'	Stadium: BC Place; Attendance: 22,120; Referee: Hilario Grajeda

July 23, 2016 22	Houston Dynamo	0–0	Whitecaps FC	Houston, Texas
19:00 PDT	Wenger (yellow card) 62'	Report	Hurtado (yellow card) 84'	Stadium: BBVA Compass Stadium; Attendance: 16,465; Referee: Jaime Herrera

July 31, 2016 23	FC Dallas	2–0	Whitecaps FC	Frisco, Texas
15:00 PDT	Acosta 56'; Urruti 59'	Report		Stadium: Toyota Stadium; Attendance: 13,824; Referee: Jair Marrufo

August 6, 2016 24	Colorado Rapids	2–0	Whitecaps FC	Commerce City, Colorado
18:00 PDT	Hairston 44'; Badji 60'	Report	Edgar (yellow card) 29'; Bolaños (yellow card) 64'; Waston (yellow card) 89'	Stadium: Dick's Sporting Goods Park; Attendance: 17,526; Referee: Chris Penso

August 12, 2016 25	Whitecaps FC	1–2	San Jose Earthquakes	Vancouver
20:00 PDT	Mezquida 90+4'	Report	Amarikwa 14'; Alashe (yellow card) 35'; Dawkins 60'	Stadium: BC Place; Attendance: 22,120; Referee: Drew Fischer

August 20, 2016 26	Sporting Kansas City	2–0	Whitecaps FC	Kansas City, Kansas
19:00 PDT	Ellis (yellow card) 10'; Besler (yellow card) 17'; Peterson 39'; Feilhaber 64' (pen.); Dwyer (yellow card) 77'	Report		Stadium: Children's Mercy Park; Attendance: 20,159; Referee: Kevin Stott

August 27, 2016 27	LA Galaxy	0–0	Whitecaps FC	Carson, California
19:30 PDT	Rogers (yellow card) 53'	Report	Aird (yellow card) 27'	Stadium: StubHub Center; Attendance: 25,667; Referee: Alan Kelly

September 3, 2016 28	Whitecaps FC	0–1	New York Red Bulls	Vancouver
16:00 PDT	Aird (yellow card) 29': Jacobson (yellow card) 88'	Report	Muyl (yellow card) 20'; Wright-Phillips 50'; Grella (yellow card) 60'	Stadium: BC Place; Attendance: 22,120; Referee: Sorin Stoica

September 10, 2016 29	Columbus Crew SC	1–3	Whitecaps FC	Columbus, Ohio
15:00 PDT	Kamara 11'; Tchani (red card) 86'	Report	Sauro 13' (o.g.); Techera (yellow card) 19'; Jacobson 74'; Hurtado 82'; Mezquida (yellow card) 85'	Stadium: Mapfre Stadium; Attendance: 15,589; Referee: Fotis Bazakos

September 17, 2016 30 Cascadia Cup	Seattle Sounders FC	1–0	Whitecaps FC	Seattle, Washington
13:00 PDT	Morris 81'; Mears (yellow card) 90+1'; Valdez (yellow card) 90+1'	Report	Techera (yellow card) 39'; Edgar (yellow card) 90+3'	Stadium: CenturyLink Field; Attendance: 47,111; Referee: Jair Marufo

September 24, 2016 31	Whitecaps FC	3–3	Colorado Rapids	Vancouver
16:00 PDT	Waston 51', (red card) 56'; Morales 70'; Harvey (yellow card) 74'; Laba (yellow card) 77'; Hurtado 90+3'	Report	Badji 8', (yellow card) 87'; Azira (yellow card) 39'; Gashi 57' (pen.), 75'	Stadium: BC Place; Attendance: 21,851; Referee: Baldomero Toledo

October 2, 2016 32 Cascadia Cup	Whitecaps FC	1–2	Seattle Sounders FC	Vancouver
17:00 PDT	Morales 25' (pen.), (red card) 53'; Barnes (yellow card) 32'; Pérez (yellow card) 80'	Report	Alonso 39'; Fisher (yellow card) 46'; Evans 81' (pen.), (red card) 84'	Stadium: BC Place; Attendance: 24,837; Referee: Ricardo Zalazar

October 16, 2016 33	San Jose Earthquakes	0–0	Whitecaps FC	San Jose, California
16:00 PDT	Godoy (yellow card) 44'	Report	Techera (yellow card) 68'	Stadium: Avaya Stadium; Attendance: 18,000; Referee: Fotis Bazakos

October 23, 2016 34 Cascadia Cup	Whitecaps FC	4–1	Portland Timbers	Vancouver
13:00 PDT	Barnes 13', 32'; Waston (yellow card) 26'; Pedro Morales 54', (yellow card) 54'; Mezquida 55'	Report	Adi (yellow card) 37'; Valeri 72' (pen.)	Stadium: BC Place; Attendance: 24,083; Referee: Alan Kelly

== CONCACAF Champions League ==
=== Group stage ===
Pos	Team	Pld	W	D	L	GF	GA	GD	Pts	Qualification	VAN	SKC	CEN
1	(Canada) Vancouver Whitecaps FC	4	4	0	0	10	2	+8	12	Quarter-finals	—	3–0	4–1
2	(United States) Sporting Kansas City	4	1	1	2	6	8	−2	4		1–2	—	3–1
3	(Trinidad and Tobago) Central	4	0	1	3	4	10	−6	1		0–1	2–2	—

Source: CONCACAF

August 2, 2016 1	Central (Trinidad and Tobago)	0–1	Whitecaps FC	Couva, Trinidad and Tobago
17:00 (PDT)	Ettienne (yellow card) 83'; Goodridge (yellow card) 85'	Report	Techera 34'; Hurtado (yellow card) 38'; Kah (yellow card) 60'	Stadium: Ato Boldon Stadium; Referee: Sherwin Moore (Guyana)

August 23, 2016 2	Whitecaps FC	3–0	(United States) Sporting Kansas City	Vancouver
19:00 (PDT)	Techera 8', 64'; Hurtado 12'; Teibert (yellow card) 32'; Waston (yellow card) 39'	Report		Stadium: BC Place; Attendance: 16,383; Referee: Erick Miranda (Mexico)

September 13, 2016 3	Sporting Kansas City (United States)	1–2	Whitecaps FC	Kansas City, Kansas, U.S.
17:00 (PDT)	Rubio 55'	Report	Hurtado 41'; Jacobson (yellow card) 73'; Davies 90+3'	Stadium: Children's Mercy Park; Attendance: 13,422; Referee: Ricardo Montero (Costa Rica)

September 28, 2016 4	Whitecaps FC	4–1	(Trinidad and Tobago) Central	Vancouver
19:00 (PDT)	Pérez 11'; Techera 22' (pen.), 70'; Kudo 49'; Aird (yellow card) 69'	Report	Goodridge (yellow card) 21'; De Silva 44'; Paul (yellow card) 65'	Stadium: BC Place; Attendance: 17,038; Referee: Luis Enrique Santander (Mexico)

=== Knockout stage ===
The 2016–17 CONCACAF Champions League used a fall-spring schedule in contrast to Major League Soccer's spring-fall format, so the knockout stages were played by Vancouver in the beginning of their 2017 season.

== Canadian Championship ==
June 1, 2016 Semifinal	Ottawa Fury FC	2–0	Whitecaps FC	Ottawa, Ontario
16:30 (PDT)	Steele 3'; Obasi (yellow card) 16'; Paulo Jr. 41'; Haworth (yellow card) 63'; Eustáquio (yellow card) 90+2'	report		Stadium: TD Place Stadium; Attendance: 9,057; Referee: Yusri Rudolf

June 8, 2016 Semifinal	Whitecaps FC	3–0 (3–2 agg.)	Ottawa Fury FC	Vancouver
19:00 (PDT)	Morales 3' (pen.); Mezquida 20'; Rivero 52'; Parker (yellow card) 67'	report	Alves (yellow card) 2' de Guzman (yellow card) 73'	Stadium: BC Place; Attendance: 17,863; Referee: Geoff Gamble

June 21, 2016 Final	Toronto FC	1–0	Whitecaps FC	Toronto, Ontario
16:30 (PDT)	Giovinco 43'	report	Bolaños (yellow card) 64'	Stadium: BMO Field; Attendance: 20,011; Referee: Mathieu Bordeau

June 29, 2016 Final	Whitecaps FC	2–1 (2–2 (a) agg.)	Toronto FC	Vancouver
19:00 (PDT)	Waston (yellow card) 32'; Mezquida 47'; Manneh (yellow card) 62'; Parker 68'	Report	Johnson 90+5'	Stadium: BC Place; Attendance: 19,376; Referee: Drew Fischer

== Friendlies ==
July 19, 2016	Whitecaps FC	2–2	(England) Crystal Palace	Vancouver
(PDT)	Edgar 50'; Waston 78'	Report	Dann (yellow card) 53'; Campbell 62', 66'	Stadium: BC Place; Attendance: 14,778; Referee: Drew Fischer

== Cascadia Cup ==
Cascadia Cup standings
Team	Pld	W	L	D	GF	GA	GD	Pts
Vancouver Whitecaps FC	6	3	3	0	11	10	+1	9
Portland Timbers	6	3	3	0	14	14	0	9
Seattle Sounders FC	6	3	3	0	10	11	−1	9

Source: "Cascadia Cup". cascadiacup.soccer. January 2016.

Overall								Home						Away					
Pld	Pts	W	L	T	GF	GA	GD	W	L	T	GF	GA	GD	W	L	T	GF	GA	GD
6	9	3	3	0	11	10	+1	2	1	0	7	4	+3	1	2	0	4	6	−2

Last updated: 23 October 2016
Source: Standings
Pld = Matches played; Pts = Points; W = Matches won; T = Matches tied; L = Matches lost; GF = Goals for; GA = Goals against; GD = Goal difference

== Playing statistics ==
As of 22 October 2016

Appearances (Apps.) numbers are for appearances in competitive games only including sub appearances
Red card numbers denote: Numbers in parentheses represent red cards overturned for wrongful dismissal.

No.	Nat.	Player	Pos.	MLS				Canadian Championship				Champions League				Total			
No.	Nat.	Player	Pos.	Apps	Goal	Yellow card	Red card	Apps	Goal	Yellow card	Red card	Apps	Goal	Yellow card	Red card	Apps	Goal	Yellow card	Red card
1	(Denmark)	David Ousted	GK	32				1								33			
2	(United States)	Jordan Harvey	DF	27	2	2		2								29	2	2	
4	(Costa Rica)	Kendall Waston	DF	25	3	7	3	2		1		3		1		30	3	9	3
6	(Costa Rica)	Jordan Smith	DF	17		2	1	1				2				20		2	1
7	(Costa Rica)	Christian Bolaños	MF	26	5	2		2		1						28	5	3	
8	(Canada)	Fraser Aird	DF	17		4	1	2				4		2		23		6	1
9	(Japan)	Masato Kudo	FW	17	2							2	1			19	3		
11	(Uruguay)	Nicolás Mezquida	MF	27	3	1		3	2			3				33	5	1	
13	(Uruguay)	Cristian Techera	MF	29	2	3		1				3	5			33	7	3	
14	(United States)	Cole Seiler	DF	2				1				1				4			
15	(Argentina)	Matías Laba	MF	31		5	1	2				1				34		5	1
17	(United States)	Andrew Jacobson	MF	25	2	4		2				3		1		30	2	5	
18	(Canada)	David Edgar	DF	8		2						1				9		2	
19	(United States)	Erik Hurtado	FW	23	2	2		4				3	2	1		30	4	3	
20	(Honduras)	Deybi Flores	MF	1												1			
22	(United States)	Christian Dean	DF																
23	(The Gambia)	Kekuta Manneh	MF	17	5	1		4		1						21	5	2	
24	(Canada)	Marco Carducci	GK																
26	(United States)	Tim Parker	DF	28		1		3	1	1		3				34	1	2	
27	(Panama)	Blas Pérez	FW	21	2	5		2				3	1			26	3	5	
28	(Jamaica)	Giles Barnes	FW	9		1										9		1	
30	(Canada)	Ben McKendry	MF					2				2				4			
31	(Canada)	Russell Teibert	MF	11		1		4				2		1		17		2	
32	(Canada)	Marco Bustos	MF	3				1				1				5			
33	(Canada)	Marcel de Jong	MF	7		1						2				9		1	
38	(Canada)	Kianz Froese	MF	5		1		1				1				7		1	
44	(Norway)	Pa Modou Kah	DF	5		3		1				1		1		7		4	
46	(Canada)	Brett Levis	DF									4				4			
67	(Canada)	Alphonso Davies	MF	8				4				3	1			15	1		
70	(Italy)	Paolo Tornaghi	GK	1				3				2				6			
77	(Chile)	Pedro Morales	MF	26	8	3	2	3	1			1				30	9	3	2
	(Jamaica)	Darren Mattocks*	FW																
3	(Canada)	Sam Adekugbe*	DF	2				2								4			
29	(Uruguay)	Octavio Rivero*	FW	12	2	4		3	1							15	3	4	
39	(United States)	Spencer Richey*	GK									2				2			
47	(United States)	Kyle Greig*	FW									3				3			
Own goals					3				0				0				3		
Totals					41	55	8		5	4	0		10	7	0		56	66	8

Source: (for players and positions) First Team Squad (for squad numbers) (for actual stats.)

*No longer with team

== See also ==
- 2016 Whitecaps FC 2 season
