= 2015 Vancouver Whitecaps FC season =

Vancouver Whitecaps FC 2015 soccer season

Vancouver Whitecaps FC
2015 season
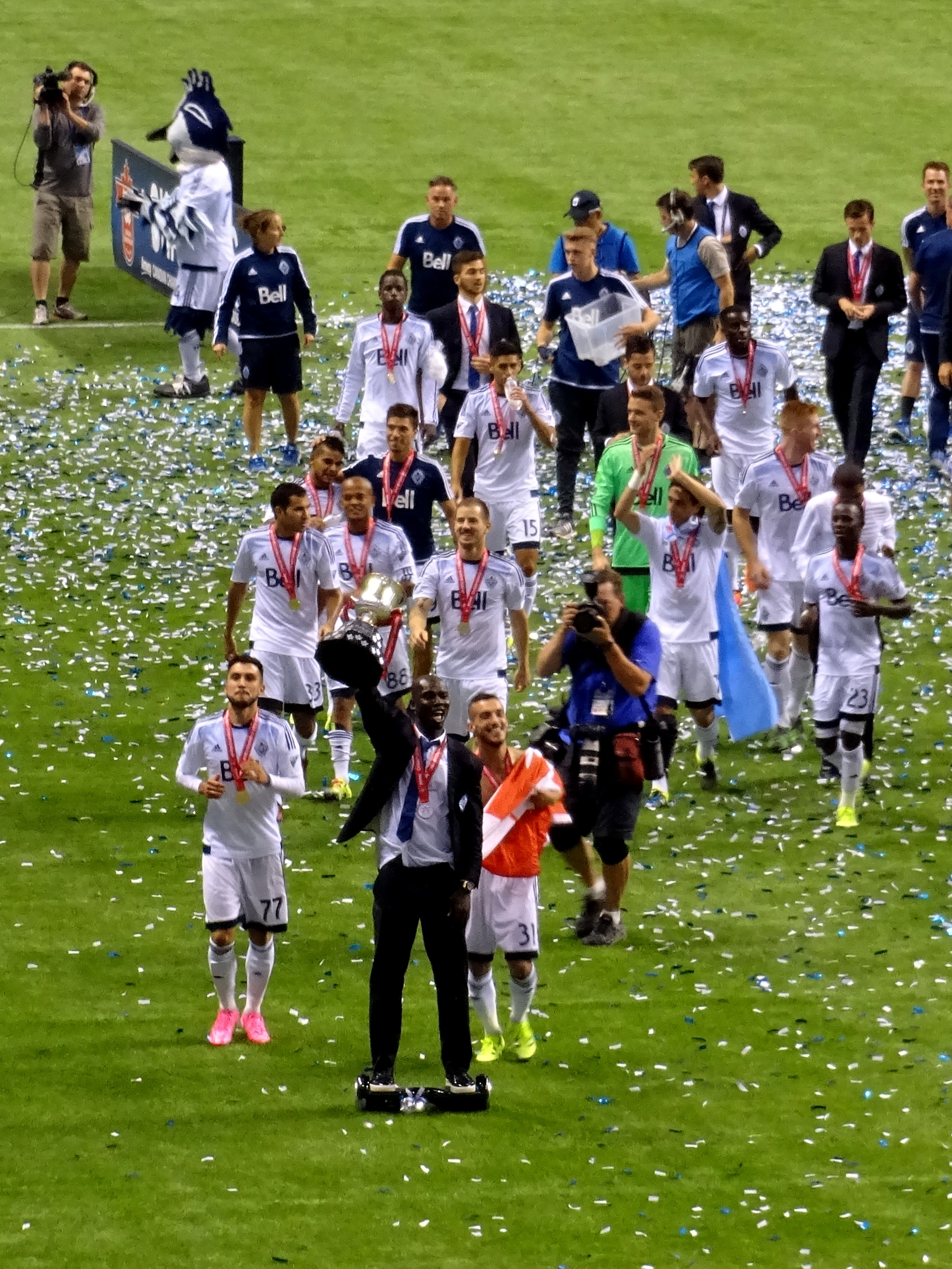
- Whitecaps FC celebrating the 2015 Canadian Championship.
- Chairman: John Furlong
- Head coach: Carl Robinson
- Stadium: BC Place (Capacity: 21,000)
- Major League Soccer: Conference: 2nd Overall: 3rd
- MLS Cup Playoffs: Conference Semifinals
- Canadian Championship: Winners
- Cascadia Cup: Runners-Up
- Top goalscorer: Octavio Rivero (10)
Home colours	Away colours

The 2015 Vancouver Whitecaps FC season was the Whitecaps' fifth season in Major League Soccer, the top tier of soccer in the United States and Canada.

== Season overview ==
Competition	Starting round	Final position	Record							
Competition	Starting round	Final position	Pld	W	D	L	GF	GA	GD	Win %
Major League Soccer	Matchday 1	Conference semifinals	36	16	6	14	45	38	+7	44.44
Canadian Championship	Semifinals	Winners	4	2	2	0	7	4	+3	50.00
CONCACAF Champions League	Group stage	Group stage (3rd)	4	1	1	2	2	5	−3	25.00
Total			44	19	9	16	54	47	+7	43.18

Last updated: 8 November 2015
Source: Competitions

== Roster ==
As of August 10, 2015

No.	Player	Nationality	Position	Date of birth (age)	Previous club
Goalkeepers
1	David Ousted	Denmark	GK	February 1, 1985 (age 41)	Randers FC
24	Marco Carducci	Canada	GK	September 26, 1996 (age 30)	Vancouver Whitecaps FC Residency
70	Paolo Tornaghi	Italy	GK	June 21, 1988 (age 38)	Chicago Fire
Defenders
2	Jordan Harvey	United States	DF	January 28, 1984 (age 42)	Philadelphia Union
3	Sam Adekugbe	Canada	DF	January 16, 1995 (age 31)	Vancouver Whitecaps FC Residency
4	Kendall Waston	Costa Rica	DF	January 1, 1988 (age 38)	Deportivo Saprissa
6	Jordan Smith	Costa Rica	DF	April 23, 1991 (age 35)	Deportivo Saprissa
18	Diego Rodríguez	Uruguay	DF	January 8, 1991 (age 35)	Juventud
22	Christian Dean	United States	DF	March 14, 1993 (age 33)	California Golden Bears
26	Tim Parker	United States	DF	February 23, 1993 (age 33)	St. John's Red Storm
27	Ethen Sampson	South Africa	DF	December 28, 1993 (age 32)	Vancouver Whitecaps FC U-23
33	Steven Beitashour	Iran	DF	February 1, 1987 (age 39)	San Jose Earthquakes
44	Pa-Modou Kah	Norway	DF	July 30, 1980 (age 46)	Portland Timbers
Midfielders
7	Mauro Rosales	Argentina	MF	February 24, 1981 (age 45)	Chivas USA
13	Cristian Techera	Uruguay	MF	May 31, 1992 (age 34)	River Plate Montevideo
15	Matias Laba	Argentina	MF	December 11, 1991 (age 34)	Toronto FC
20	Deybi Flores	Honduras	MF	June 16, 1996 (age 30)	C.D. Motagua
25	Andre Lewis	Jamaica	MF	August 12, 1994 (age 32)	Portmore United F.C.
28	Gershon Koffie	Ghana	MF	August 25, 1991 (age 35)	Vancouver Whitecaps (USSF-D2)
29	Nicolás Mezquida	Uruguay	MF	January 21, 1992 (age 34)	Fénix
30	Ben McKendry	Canada	MF	March 25, 1993 (age 33)	Vancouver Whitecaps FC Residency
31	Russell Teibert	Canada	MF	December 22, 1992 (age 33)	Vancouver Whitecaps (USSF-D2)
32	Marco Bustos	Canada	MF	April 22, 1996 (age 30)	Vancouver Whitecaps FC Residency
38	Kianz Froese	Canada	MF	April 16, 1996 (age 30)	Vancouver Whitecaps FC Residency
77	Pedro Morales	Chile	MF	May 25, 1985 (age 41)	Málaga CF
Forwards
11	Darren Mattocks	Jamaica	FW	September 2, 1990 (age 36)	Akron Zips
19	Erik Hurtado (on loan to Mjøndalen)	United States	FW	May 11, 1990 (age 36)	Santa Clara
23	Kekuta Manneh	Gambia	FW	December 30, 1994 (age 31)	Austin Aztex
29	Octavio Rivero	Uruguay	FW	January 24, 1992 (age 34)	O'Higgins F.C.
34	Caleb Clarke	Canada	FW	June 23, 1993 (age 33)	Vancouver Whitecaps FC Residency
88	Robert Earnshaw	Wales	FW	April 6, 1981 (age 45)	Chicago Fire

=== Transfers ===
==== In ====
No.	Pos.	Player	Transferred from	Fee/notes	Date	Ref.
29	ST	(Uruguay) Octavio Rivero	(Chile) O'Higgins F.C.	Undisclosed / Designated Player	December 25, 2014	
18	DF	(Uruguay) Diego Rodríguez	(Uruguay) Juventud	Loan	January 14, 2015	
26	DF	(United States) Tim Parker	(United States) St. John's Red Storm	Selected in the 2015 MLS SuperDraft	January 15, 2015	
44	DF	(Norway) Pa-Modou Kah	(United States) Portland Timbers	Free	January 21, 2015	
20	MF	(Honduras) Deybi Flores	(Honduras) C.D. Motagua	Loan	February 24, 2015	
88	ST	(Wales) Robert Earnshaw	(United States) Chicago Fire	Free	March 25, 2015	
13	FW	(Uruguay) Cristian Techera	(Uruguay) River Plate Montevideo	Loan	April 9, 2015	
6	DF	(Costa Rica) Jordan Smith	(Costa Rica) Deportivo Saprissa	Loan	August 6, 2015	

==== Out ====
Pos.	Player	Transferred to	Fee/notes	Date	Ref.
MF	(Canada) Bryce Alderson		Released	November 14, 2014	
DF	(Republic of Ireland) Andy O'Brien		Out of Contract	November 14, 2014	
DF	(Trinidad and Tobago) Carlyle Mitchell	(South Korea) Seoul E-Land	Released	November 14, 2014	
FW	(Senegal) Mamadou Diouf		Option Declined	December 8, 2014	
MF	(Uruguay) Sebástian Fernández	(Uruguay) Boston River	Loan Return / Option Declined	December 8, 2014	
DF	(Honduras) Johnny Leverón	(Honduras) C.D. Marathón	Option Declined	December 8, 2014	
FW	(United States) Omar Salgado	(United States) New York City FC	Trade	December 8, 2014	
MF	(Morocco) Mehdi Ballouchy	(United States) New York City FC	Selected in 2014 MLS Expansion Draft	December 10, 2014	
FW	(United States) Erik Hurtado	(Norway) Mjøndalen	Loan	August 7, 2015	

=== Technical staff ===
Role	Name	Nation
Head coach	Carl Robinson	Wales
Assistant coach	Gordon Forest	Scotland
Assistant coach	Martyn Pert	England
Head of Scouting & Analysis	Daniel Stenz	Germany
Goalkeeper coach	Marius Røvde	Norway
Physiotherapist	Graeme Poole	Canada

=== Management ===
Role	Name	Nation
Executive Chair	John Furlong	Ireland
President	Bob Lenarduzzi	Canada
chief operating officer	Rachel Lewis	Canada
Vice-President of Finance & Administration	Don Ford	Canada

== Major League Soccer ==
=== Preseason ===
February 4 Desert Friendlies 1	Whitecaps FC	2–0	New England Revolution	Tucson, Arizona
10:00 am PST	Rivero 57', 62'; Harvey (yellow card) 78'	Report	Bunbury (yellow card) 21'	Stadium: Kino North Stadium

February 7 Desert Friendlies 2	San Jose Earthquakes	1–1	Whitecaps FC	Tucson, Arizona
4:00 pm PST	Renato 28'; Barklage (red card) 82'	Report	Waston (yellow card) 34'; Manneh 65'	Stadium: Kino North Stadium

February 10 Desert Friendlies 3	Houston Dynamo	1–0	Whitecaps FC	Tucson, Arizona
9:00 am PST	Rodríguez (yellow card) 17'; Horst (yellow card) 29'; Taylor 52'	Report		Stadium: Kino North Stadium

February 15 Friendly	Victoria Vikes	0–6	Whitecaps FC	Victoria, British Columbia
2:00 pm PST	Alex Redpath (yellow card) 26'	Report	Morales 3'; Teibert 7'; Bustos 19'; Rivero 28'; Rodríguez 54'; Froese 77'	Stadium: Centennial Stadium; Attendance: 2,500; Referee: Alain Ruch

February 22 Simple Invitational 1	Portland Timbers	0–1	Whitecaps FC	Portland, Oregon
5:00 pm PST	Wallace (yellow card) 30' (yellow-red card) 60'; Ridgewell (yellow card) 54' (yellow-red card) 89'; Borchers (yellow card) 80'	Report	Kah (yellow card) 22', (goal) 31'; Waston (yellow card) 66'; Mezquida (yellow card) 88'	Stadium: Providence Park

February 25 Simple Invitational 2	Whitecaps FC	3–2	Stabæk Fotball	Portland, Oregon
5:00 pm PST	Mezquida 13'; Mattocks 23' (pen.), 44'; Hurtado (yellow card) 24'; Sampson (yellow card) 70'	Report	Kassi (yellow card) 62'; Trondsen 68' (pen.); Gómez 81' (o.g.)	Stadium: Providence Park

February 28 Simple Invitational 3	Whitecaps FC	1–1	Chicago Fire	Portland, Oregon
2:30 pm PST	Kah 31'; Waston (yellow card) 52'	Report	Winchester 90'	Stadium: Providence Park

=== Regular season ===
==== Results ====
Overall								Home						Away					
Pld	Pts	W	L	T	GF	GA	GD	W	L	T	GF	GA	GD	W	L	T	GF	GA	GD
34	53	16	13	5	45	36	+9	9	5	2	27	15	+12	7	8	3	18	21	−3

Last updated: October 25, 2015
Pld = Matches played; Pts = Points; W = Matches won; T = Matches tied; L = Matches lost; GF = Goals for; GA = Goals against; GD = Goal difference

Round	1	2	3	4	5	6	7	8	9	10	11	12	13	14	15	16	17	18	19	20	21	22	23	24	25	26	27	28	29	30	31	32	33	34
Ground	H	A	A	H	H	H	A	A	H	A	H	H	A	H	A	A	A	A	A	H	A	H	A	H	A	H	A	H	H	H	A	H	A	H
Result	L	W	W	W	W	D	L	W	L	D	W	L	L	W	L	W	W	W	L	L	D	W	W	W	L	W	L	W	L	L	D	D	L	W

Updated to match(es) played on August 8, 2015. Source:
A = Away; H = Home; W = Win; D = Draw; L = Loss

March 7 MLS 1	Whitecaps FC	1–3	Toronto FC	Vancouver, BC
3:00 pm PST	Rivero 19'; Koffie (yellow card) 77'; Kah (yellow card) 89'	Report	Altidore 32', 90' (pen.); Findley 59'; Creavalle (yellow card) 78'	Stadium: BC Place; Attendance: 21,000

March 14 MLS 2	Chicago Fire	0–1	Whitecaps FC	Bridgeview, Illinois
3:00 pm PDT	Polster (yellow card) 4'; Igboananike (yellow card) 90+6'	Report	Waston (yellow card) 22'; Morales (yellow card) 66'; Mezquida (yellow card) 76'; Rivero (yellow card) 82', (goal) 86'	Stadium: Toyota Park; Attendance: 15,731

March 21 MLS 3	Orlando City SC	0–1	Whitecaps FC	Orlando, Florida
4:30 pm PDT	Okugo (yellow card) 78'	Report	Koffie (yellow card) 22'; Adekugbe (yellow card) 36'; Rivero (yellow card) 44'; Manneh (yellow card) 65'; Harvey (yellow card) 90+5'; Rivero 90+6'	Stadium: Orlando Citrus Bowl Stadium; Attendance: 31,072

March 28 MLS 4	Whitecaps FC	2–1	Portland Timbers	Vancouver, BC
5:00 pm PDT	Koffie (yellow card) 12'; Mezquida 15'; Beitashour (yellow card) 58'; Waston (yellow card) 87'; Earnshaw 90'	Report	Powell (yellow card) 30'; Adi 82'	Stadium: BC Place; Attendance: 22,500

April 4 MLS 5	Whitecaps FC	2–0	LA Galaxy	Vancouver, BC
7:00 pm PDT	Kah (yellow card) 41'; Manneh 56'; Adekugbe (yellow card) 59'; Rivero 66'	Report	Zardes (yellow card) 85'	Stadium: BC Place; Attendance: 21,000

April 8 MLS 6	Whitecaps FC	2–2	Columbus Crew SC	Vancouver, BC
7:00 pm PDT	Waston (yellow card) 17'; Rivero 31'; Mattocks 64'	Report	Kamara 24', 50'; Jiménez (yellow card) 54'; Wahl (yellow card) 72'	Stadium: BC Place; Attendance: 18,083; Referee: Drew Fischer

April 11 MLS 7	San Jose Earthquakes	1–0	Whitecaps FC	San Jose, California
7:30 pm PDT	Bingham (yellow card) 11'; Nyassi 75'; Jahn (red card) 88'	Report	Mattocks (yellow card) 3'; Manneh (yellow card) 26'; Kah (yellow card) 32'; Flores (yellow card) 61'; Morales (red card) 88'; Waston (yellow card) 90+3'	Stadium: Avaya Stadium; Attendance: 18,000; Referee: Edvin Jurisevic

April 18 MLS 8	Real Salt Lake	0–1	Whitecaps FC	Sandy, Utah
6:30 pm PDT	Olave (yellow card) 41' (yellow-red card) 89'; Saucedo (red card) 76'; Beckerman (yellow card) 90+5'	Report	Teibert (yellow card) 6'; Mattocks 80'; Adekugbe (yellow card) 82'	Stadium: Rio Tinto Stadium; Attendance: 20,414; Referee: Ted Unkel

April 25 MLS 9	Whitecaps FC	1–2	D.C. United	Vancouver, BC
7:30 pm PDT	Morales 2' (yellow card) 2'; Adekugbe (yellow card) 9'; Laba (red card) 42'	Report	Boswell 9'; Rolfe 64'; Kitchen (yellow card) 83'; Farfan (yellow card) 88'	Stadium: BC Place; Attendance: 21,000; Referee: David Gantar

May 2 MLS 10	Portland Timbers	0–0	Whitecaps FC	Portland, Oregon
7:30 pm PDT	Wallace (yellow card) 44'	Report	Sampson (yellow card) 19'; Kah (yellow card) 57'	Stadium: Providence Park; Attendance: 21,144; Referee: Allen Chapman

May 9 MLS 11	Whitecaps FC	3–0	Philadelphia Union	Vancouver, BC
4:00 pm PDT	Morales 32'; Rivero 44'; Techera (yellow card) 80'; Mattocks 81'	Report	Marquez (red card) 78'	Stadium: BC Place; Attendance: 20,183; Referee: Ismail Elfath

May 16 MLS 12	Whitecaps FC	0–2	Seattle Sounders FC	Vancouver, BC
4:00 pm PDT	Laba (yellow card) 28'	Summary	Barrett 5', 38'	Stadium: BC Place; Attendance: 21,000; Referee: Mark Geiger

May 23 MLS 13	Colorado Rapids	1–0	Whitecaps FC	Commerce City, Colorado
6:00 pm PDT	Cronin (yellow card) 43'; Pittinari 51'; Doyle (yellow card) 87'	Summary	Froese (yellow card) 24'; Koffie (yellow card) 75'; Waston (yellow card) 80'	Stadium: Dick's Sporting Goods Park; Attendance: 17,791; Referee: José Carlos Rivero

May 30 MLS 14	Whitecaps FC	2–1	Real Salt Lake	Vancouver, BC
3:00 pm PDT	Koffie 36'; Kah (yellow card) 44'; Techera 79'	Summary	Stertzer (yellow card) 27'; Glad (yellow card) 41'; Morales 45'; Mansally (yellow card) 89'	Stadium: BC Place; Attendance: 21,000; Referee: Jair Marrufo

June 3 MLS 15	Montreal Impact	2–1	Whitecaps FC	Montreal, Quebec
5:00 pm PDT	McInerney 14'; Piatti 83'	Summary	Rodríguez (yellow card) 46'; Parker (yellow card) 71'; Morales 79' (pen.); Harvey (yellow card) 90'	Stadium: Saputo Stadium; Attendance: 10,035; Referee: Armando Villarreal

June 6 MLS 16	LA Galaxy	0–1	Whitecaps FC	Carson, California
7:30 pm PDT	Leonardo (yellow card) 34'	Summary	Beitashour (yellow card) 20'; Manneh 32'	Stadium: StubHub Center; Attendance: 20,219; Referee: Ricardo Salazar

June 20 MLS 17	New York Red Bulls	1–2	Whitecaps FC	Harrison, New Jersey
4:00 pm PDT	Kljestan (red card) 11'; Abang 82'	Report	Manneh 15'; Koffie (yellow card) 60'; Laba (yellow card) 63'; Froese 77'; Waston (yellow card) 90+1'	Stadium: Red Bull Arena; Attendance: 20,053

June 27 MLS 18	New England Revolution	1–2	Whitecaps FC	Foxborough, Massachusetts
4:30 pm PDT	Farrell (yellow card) 20' (yellow-red card) 29'; Fagúndez (yellow card) 41'; Bunbury (yellow card) 54', (goal) 84'	Report	Techera 18'; Rivero 31' (pen.); Harvey (yellow card) 33'; Mattocks (yellow card) 82'; Beitashour (yellow card) 88'; Mezquida (yellow card) 90+1'	Stadium: Gillette Stadium; Attendance: 16,017

July 4 MLS 19	Colorado Rapids	2–1	Whitecaps FC	Commerce City, Colorado
6:00 pm PDT	Sánchez 2'; Doyle 56'; Watts (yellow card) 65'; Pittinari (yellow card) 72'; Moor (yellow card) 77'	Report	Manneh 20'; Techera (yellow card) 28'; Rodríguez (yellow card) 61'	Stadium: Dick's Sporting Goods Park; Attendance: 18,356

July 12 MLS 20	Whitecaps FC	0–1	Sporting Kansas City	Vancouver, BC
6:00 pm PDT	Waston (yellow card) 73'	Report	Feilhaber (yellow card) 20'; Ellis 52'; Mustivar (yellow card) 58'; Németh (yellow card) 86'; Dwyer (yellow card) 88'	Stadium: BC Place; Attendance: 21,000

July 18 MLS 21	Portland Timbers	1–1	Whitecaps FC	Portland, Oregon
7:30 pm PDT	Valeri 34'; Ridgewell (yellow card) 36'; Chará (yellow card) 47'; Wallace (yellow card) 90'; Johnson (red card) 90'	Summary	Parker (yellow card) 22'; Laba 57'; Harvey (red card) 90'	Stadium: Providence Park; Attendance: 21,144; Referee: (United States) Juan Guzman

July 26 MLS 22	Whitecaps FC	3–1	San Jose Earthquakes	Vancouver, BC
4:00 pm PDT	Rosales 5'; Waston 32'; Koffie (yellow card) 37'; Rivero 56' (pen.); Mezquida (yellow card) 60'; Teibert (yellow card) 90'	Summary	Amarikwa (yellow card) 45' (goal) 90'	Stadium: BC Place; Attendance: 20,298; Referee: (United States) Edvin Jurisevic

August 1 MLS 23	Seattle Sounders FC	0–3	Whitecaps FC	Seattle, Washington
7:00 pm PDT	Dempsey (yellow card) 53'; Alonso (yellow card) 74'	Report	Kah 6', 49'; Waston (yellow card) 67'; Morales 75'	Stadium: CenturyLink Field; Attendance: 53,125

August 8 MLS 24	Whitecaps FC	4–0	Real Salt Lake	Vancouver, BC
7:00 pm PDT	Rivero 7' (pen.); Kah 40'; Techera 50' 68'; Waston (yellow card) 60'	Summary	Kavita (yellow card) 45'; Mansally (red card) 88'	Stadium: BC Place; Attendance: 20,638; Referee: (United States) Christopher Penso

August 15 MLS 25	Sporting Kansas City	4–3	Whitecaps FC	Kansas City, Kansas
6:00 pm PDT	Ellis 53'; Dia (yellow card) 61'; Dwyer 81'; Nagamura 87', 90+4' (yellow card) 90+5'	Report	Manneh 9', 41'; Laba (yellow card) 64'; Morales 75'	Stadium: Sporting Park; Attendance: 19,969

August 22 MLS 26	Whitecaps FC	1–0	FC Dallas	Vancouver, BC
7:00 pm PDT	Techera (yellow card) 24' (goal) 32'; Dean (yellow card) 85'	Report	Harris (yellow card) 35'	Stadium: BC Place; Attendance: 21,000

August 29 MLS 27	Houston Dynamo	2–0	Whitecaps FC	Houston, Texas
6:00 pm PDT	Clark 34'; Rodríguez 87'	Report	Laba (yellow card) 27' (red card) 64'; Waston (yellow card) 51' (red card) 56'	Stadium: BBVA Compass Stadium; Attendance: 21,257; Referee: Kevin Stott

September 9 MLS 28	Whitecaps FC	2–0	Colorado Rapids	Vancouver, BC
7:00 pm PDT	Koffie (yellow card) 38'; Beitashour (yellow card) 54'; Rivero 73' (yellow card) 74'; Techera 77'; Froese (yellow card) 82'	Report	Burch (yellow card) 69'; Riley (yellow card) 86'	Stadium: BC Place; Attendance: 17,583

September 19 MLS 29	Whitecaps FC	0–3	Seattle Sounders FC	Vancouver, BC
4:00 pm PDT	Teibert (yellow card) 22'; Smith (yellow card) 63'; Waston (yellow card) 81'	Report	Evans (yellow card) 24'; Ivanschitz 45'; Pineda 71'; Martins 87'	Stadium: BC Place; Attendance: 21,000

September 26 MLS 30	Whitecaps FC	1–2	New York City FC	Vancouver, BC
7:00 pm PDT	Morales (yellow card) 82' (goal) 88' (pen.); Techera (yellow card) 83'	Report	Facey (yellow card) 12'; Lampard 29'; Villa 90+5' (pen.)	Stadium: BC Place; Attendance: 21,000

October 3 MLS 31	San Jose Earthquakes	1–1	Whitecaps FC	San Jose, California
7:30 pm PDT	Goodson (yellow card) 27'; Godoy (yellow card) 37'; Wondolowski 62'; Bernárdez (yellow card) 66'	Report	Tehcera 39'; Beitashour (yellow card) 60'; Laba (yellow card) 80'	Stadium: Avaya Stadium; Attendance: 18,000

October 7 MLS 32	Whitecaps FC	0–0	FC Dallas	Vancouver, BC
7:00 pm PDT		Report		Stadium: BC Place; Attendance: 19,339

October 14 MLS 33	FC Dallas	2–0	Whitecaps FC	Frisco, Texas
6:00 pm PDT	Barrios 32'; Díaz 52'; Akindele (yellow card) 64'; Watson (yellow card) 80'	Report	Kah (yellow card) 46'; Harvey (yellow card) 55'	Stadium: Toyota Stadium; Attendance: 11,848

October 25 MLS 34	Whitecaps FC	3–0	Houston Dynamo	Vancouver, BC
4:00 pm PDT	Manneh 59' (yellow card) 84'; Waston 72'; Earnshaw 90+3'	Report	Garrido (yellow card) 52'	Stadium: BC Place; Attendance: 21,000

=== Tables ===
==== Western Conference ====
Pos	Team	Pld	W	L	T	GF	GA	GD	Pts	Qualification
1	FC Dallas	34	18	10	6	52	39	+13	60	Qualification for the conference semifinals
2	Vancouver Whitecaps FC	34	16	13	5	45	36	+9	53	Qualification for the conference semifinals
3	Portland Timbers	34	15	11	8	41	39	+2	53	Qualification for the knockout round
4	Seattle Sounders FC	34	15	13	6	44	36	+8	51	Qualification for the knockout round
5	LA Galaxy	34	14	11	9	56	46	+10	51	Qualification for the knockout round

Source: MLS

==== Overall ====
Pos	Team	Pld	W	L	T	GF	GA	GD	Pts	
1	New York Red Bulls (S)	34	18	10	6	62	43	+19	60	Qualification for the CONCACAF Champions League
2	FC Dallas	34	18	10	6	52	39	+13	60	Qualification for the CONCACAF Champions League
3	Vancouver Whitecaps FC (V)	34	16	13	5	45	36	+9	53	Qualification for the CONCACAF Champions League
4	Columbus Crew SC	34	15	11	8	58	53	+5	53	
5	Portland Timbers (C)	34	15	11	8	41	39	+2	53	Qualification for the CONCACAF Champions League

Source: MLS
Rules for classification: 1) points; 2) total wins; 3) total goal differential; 4) total goals scored
(C) MLS Cup champions; (S) Supporters' Shield winners; (V) Canadian Championship winners

=== Playoffs ===
==== Conference semifinals ====
November 1	Portland Timbers	0–0	Whitecaps FC	Portland, Oregon
2:00 pm PST	Melano (yellow card) 44'	Report	Koffie (yellow card) 45'	Stadium: Providence Park; Attendance: 21,144

November 8	Whitecaps FC	0–2 (0–2 agg.)	Portland Timbers	Vancouver, BC
7:00 pm PST	Rivero (yellow card) 55'; Beitashour (yellow card) 72'	Report	Adi 31'; Wallace (yellow card) 60'; Valeri (yellow card) 62'; Chara 90+4'	Stadium: BC Place; Attendance: 27,837

== CONCACAF Champions League ==
=== Group stage ===
Pos	Team	Pld	W	D	L	GF	GA	GD	Pts	Qualification	SEA	OLI	VAN
1	(United States) Seattle Sounders FC	4	2	1	1	6	3	+3	7	Knockout stage	—	2–1	3–0
2	(Honduras) Olimpia	4	2	0	2	3	3	0	6		1–0	—	1–0
3	(Canada) Vancouver Whitecaps FC	4	1	1	2	2	5	−3	4		1–1	1–0	—

Source: CONCACAF

August 5, 2015	Vancouver Whitecaps FC (Canada)	1–1	(United States) Seattle Sounders FC	Vancouver, British Columbia, Canada
7:00 PDT	Parker 61'	Report	Barrett (yellow card) 58'; Neagle 72'; Azira (yellow card) 73'	Stadium: BC Place; Attendance: 19,683; Referee: Jorge Isaac Rojas Castillo (Mexico)

September 16, 2015	Vancouver Whitecaps FC (Canada)	1–0	(Honduras) Olimpia	Vancouver, British Columbia, Canada
7:00 PDT	Froese 42'; Laba (yellow card) 48'	Report	Palacios (yellow card) 50'; Johnson (yellow card) 90+1'	Stadium: BC Place; Attendance: 15,491; Referee: Jeffrey Solís (Costa Rica)

September 23, 2015	Seattle Sounders FC (United States)	3–0	(Canada) Vancouver Whitecaps FC	Seattle, United States
7:00 PDT	Neagle 32', 47'; Barrett 39'	Report		Stadium: CenturyLink Field; Attendance: 37,624; Referee: Fernando Guerrero (Mexico)

October 22, 2015	Olimpia (Honduras)	1–0	(Canada) Vancouver Whitecaps FC	Tegucigalpa, Honduras
7:00 PDT	Méndez (yellow card) 27'; Martínez 68'; Estupiñán (yellow card) 84'	Report	Bustos (yellow card) 42'; Smith (yellow card) 74'	Stadium: Estadio Tiburcio Carias Andino; Referee: Trevor Taylor (Barbados)

== Canadian Championship ==
=== Semi-finals ===
May 13, 2015	Whitecaps FC	1–1	FC Edmonton	BC Place, Vancouver, British Columbia
19:00 PDT (UTC-07)	Flores (yellow card) 51'; Koffie (yellow card) 59' (goal) 87'	Report	Ameobi 4'; Smith (yellow card) 26'	Attendance: 15,183; Referee: Dave Gantar

May 20, 2015	FC Edmonton	1–2 (2–3 agg.)	Whitecaps FC	Clarke Stadium, Edmonton, Alberta
20:00 MDT (UTC-06)	Van Oekel (yellow card) 8'; Granitto (yellow card) 38'; Ameobi 90+1' (pen.); Edward (yellow card) 90+6'	Report	Morales 9' (pen.); Mezquida (yellow card) 19'; Mattocks (yellow card) 60'; Sampson (yellow card) 70'; Dean (yellow card) 73'; Laba 90+7'	Attendance: 3,803; Referee: Silviu Petrescu

1. Edmonton had originally been scheduled to host the first leg of the semi-final against Vancouver in Edmonton on May 6, 2015 but the match was postponed due to snow.

=== Finals ===
August 12, 2015	Montreal Impact	2–2	Whitecaps FC	Saputo Stadium, Montreal, Quebec
19:30 EDT (UTC-04)	Ciman 84'; Jackson-Hamel 85'	Report	Waston (yellow card) 11'; Mattocks 65'; Morales 72'; Tornaghi (yellow card) 90+1'	Attendance: 12,395; Referee: Dave Gantar

August 25, 2015	Whitecaps FC	2–0 (4–2 agg.)	Montreal Impact	BC Place, Vancouver, British Columbia
	Rivero 40'; Parker 53'		Cabrera (yellow card) 22' (yellow-red card) 30'; Ciman (yellow card) 23'; Oduro (yellow card) 31'	Attendance: 19,616

== Cascadia Cup ==
The 2015 Cascadia Cup will feature nine matches total, six of which feature the Whitecaps, three of which will be hosted at BC Place: two against Seattle Sounders FC, and one versus the Portland Timbers. Portland will host two matches at Providence Park, and Seattle will host one at CenturyLink Field.

March 28, 2015 Cascadia Cup 1	Whitecaps FC	2–1	Portland Timbers	Vancouver, BC
5:00pm (PDT)	Koffie (yellow card) 12'; Mezquida 15'; Beitashour (yellow card) 58'; Waston (yellow card) 87'; Earnshaw 90'	Report	Powell (yellow card) 30'; Adi 82'	Stadium: BC Place; Attendance: 22,500; Referee: Allen Chapman

May 2, 2015 Cascadia Cup 3	Portland Timbers	0–0	Whitecaps FC	Portland, OR
7:30pm (PDT)	Wallace (yellow card) 44'	report	Sampson (yellow card) 19'; Kah (yellow card) 57'	Stadium: Providence Park; Attendance: 21,144; Referee: Allen Chapman

May 16, 2015 Cascadia Cup 4	Whitecaps FC	0–2	Seattle Sounders FC	Vancouver, BC
4:00pm (PDT)	Laba (yellow card) 28'	report	Barrett 5', 38'	Stadium: BC Place; Attendance: 21,000; Referee: Mark Geiger

July 18, 2015 Cascadia Cup 6	Portland Timbers	1–1	Whitecaps FC	Portland, OR
7:30pm (PDT)	Valeri 33'; Ridgewell (yellow card) 36'; Chara (yellow card) 47'; Wallace (yellow card) 90+2'; Johnson (red card) 90+5'	Report	Parker (yellow card) 22'; Laba 57'; Harvey (red card) 90+1'	Stadium: Providence Park; Attendance: 21,144; Referee: Juan Guzman

August 1, 2015 Cascadia Cup 7	Seattle Sounders FC	0–3	Whitecaps FC	Seattle, WA
7:00pm (PDT)	Dempsey (yellow card) 53'; Alonso (yellow card) 53'	Report	Kah 6', 49'; Waston (yellow card) 67'; Morales 75'	Stadium: CenturyLink Field; Attendance: 53125; Referee: Mark Geiger

September 19 Cascadia Cup 9	Whitecaps FC	0–3	Seattle Sounders FC	Vancouver, BC
4:00 pm PDT	Teibert (yellow card) 22'; Smith (yellow card) 63'; Waston (yellow card) 81'	Report	Evans (yellow card) 24'; Ivanschitz 45'; Pineda 71'; Martins 87'	Stadium: BC Place; Attendance: 21,000

== See also ==
- 2015 Whitecaps FC 2 season
