= Kendall Waston =

Costa Rican footballer (born 1988)

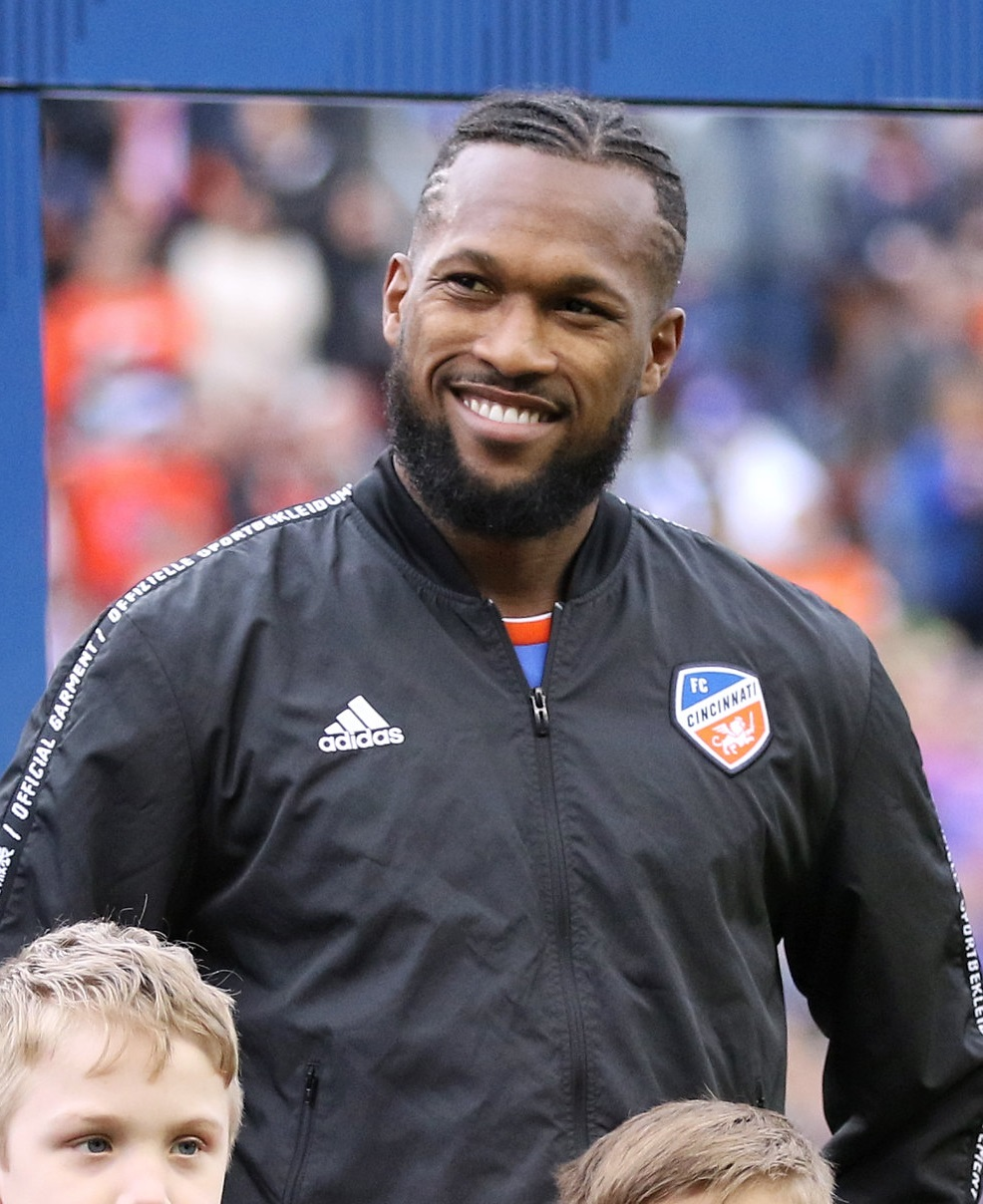
- Waston with FC Cincinnati in 2019

Personal information
- Full name: Kendall Jamaal Waston Manley
- Date of birth: 1 January 1988 (age 38)
- Place of birth: San José, Costa Rica
- Height: 1.96 m (6 ft 5 in)
- Positions: Centre-back; forward

Team information
- Current team: Saprissa
- Number: 4

Youth career
- Saprissa

Senior career*
Years	Team	Apps	(Gls)
2006–2014	Saprissa	41	(8)
2007	→ Carmelita (loan)		
2008	→ Nacional (loan)	0	(0)
2010	→ Bayamón (loan)		
2010–2011	→ UCR (loan)	19	(5)
2011–2012	→ Pérez Zeledón (loan)	35	(6)
2013	→ Pérez Zeledón (loan)	22	(6)
2014–2018	Vancouver Whitecaps FC	115	(14)
2019–2020	FC Cincinnati	42	(1)
2021–	Saprissa	163	(32)

International career^{‡}
- Costa Rica U17
	Costa Rica U20	1	(0)
2008	Costa Rica U23		
2013–	Costa Rica	78	(10)
- * Club domestic league appearances and goals as of 22:28, 2 November 2025 (UTC) ‡ National team caps and goals as of 23:21, 18 November 2025 (UTC)

Kendall Jamaal Waston Manley (born 1 January 1988) is a Costa Rican professional footballer who plays as a centre-back and forward for Liga FPD club Saprissa and the Costa Rica national team.

== Club career ==
=== Saprissa and loans ===
Waston made his professional debut for Saprissa in 2006 and played on loan for Carmelita in the Primera División de Costa Rica before moving abroad for a six-month loan spell with Club Nacional de Football in the Primera División Uruguaya from February 2008. In March 2010, Waston signed a three-month loan deal with Bayamón of the Puerto Rico Soccer League to help the club qualify for the CONCACAF Champions League. He later had three more loan spells, one at UCR and two at Pérez Zeledón. In May 2012 Waston returned to Deportivo Saprissa to be part of the first team.

=== Vancouver Whitecaps FC ===
On 8 August 2014, Vancouver Whitecaps FC announced a deal that they had acquired the defender from Saprissa. Waston joined the first team in the midst of their 2014 MLS season.

On 25 October 2014, Waston scored the only goal in the Whitecaps' final game of the regular season, heading in a corner kick from Pedro Morales, sending the Whitecaps to the playoffs for the second time in their four years since joining MLS. The impact that Waston had on the Whitecaps' season after joining the club earned him a nomination for MLS Player of the Month for October. Waston played his 100th MLS game for the Whitecaps on 26 May 2018, against San Jose. He signed a new contract before the 2018 season, becoming a designated player under league rules. Waston was the captain of Vancouver Whitecaps, having been named so before the 2017 MLS season.

=== FC Cincinnati ===
On 11 December 2018, Waston was traded to FC Cincinnati ahead of their inaugural season in MLS. Vancouver received $450,000 of General Allocation Money, $300,000 of Targeted Allocation Money and an international roster spot. Waston captained the team for the majority of the 2019 MLS season. He was released by Cincinnati at the end of their 2020 season.

== International career ==
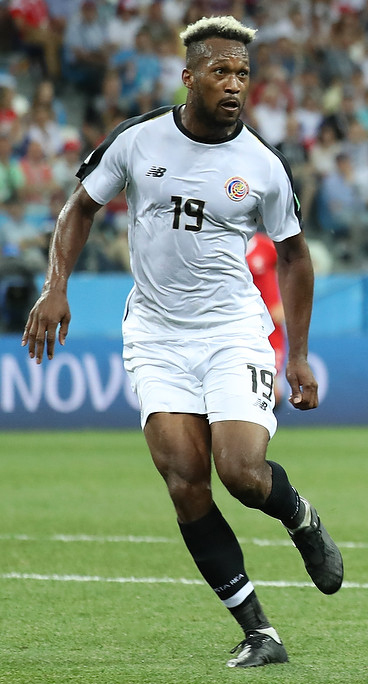
Waston with Costa Rica at the 2018 FIFA World Cup

A big defender, Waston was part of Costa Rica's 2007 FIFA U-20 World Cup squad.

Born in Costa Rica, Waston is of Jamaican descent. He made his senior debut for Costa Rica in a May 2013 match against Canada and earned, as of December 2014, one more cap in a 2014 FIFA World Cup qualification against Honduras. On 8 October, he scored a 95th-minute equaliser for Costa Rica against Honduras to send Costa Rica to the 2018 FIFA World Cup. While placed on the bench for the first two games of the FIFA world cup Kendall had a chance to play in the third match and was able to score off a header and gain his first World Cup goal.

== Career statistics ==
=== International ===
As of match played 18 November 2025

Appearances and goals by national team and year
National team	Year	Apps	Goals
Costa Rica	2013	2	0
Costa Rica	2015	3	1
Costa Rica	2016	10	0
Costa Rica	2017	9	2
Costa Rica	2018	7	4
Costa Rica	2019	11	0
Costa Rica	2020	1	0
Costa Rica	2021	10	0
Costa Rica	2022	13	2
Costa Rica	2023	8	1
Costa Rica	2025	4	0
Total		78	10

Scores and results list Costa Rica's goal tally first.

List of international goals scored by Kendall Waston
No.	Date	Venue	Opponent	Score	Result	Competition
1.	15 December 2015	Estadio Edgardo Baltodano Briceño, Liberia, Costa Rica	Nicaragua	1–0	1–0	Friendly
2.	28 March 2017	Estadio Francisco Morazán, San Pedro Sula, Honduras	Honduras	1–1	1–1	2018 FIFA World Cup qualification
3.	7 October 2017	Estadio Nacional, San José, Costa Rica	Honduras	1–1	1–1	2018 FIFA World Cup qualification
4.	27 June 2018	Nizhny Novgorod Stadium, Nizhny Novgorod, Russia	Switzerland	1–1	2–2	2018 FIFA World Cup
5.	16 October 2018	Red Bull Arena, Harrison, United States	Colombia	1–1	1–3	Friendly
6.	16 November 2018	Estadio El Teniente, Rancagua, Chile	Chile	1–0	3–2	Friendly
7.	16 November 2018	Estadio El Teniente, Rancagua, Chile	Chile	2–0	3–2	Friendly
8.	27 September 2022	Suwon World Cup Stadium, Suwon, South Korea	Uzbekistan	2–1	2–1	Friendly
9.	9 November 2022	Estadio Nacional, San José, Costa Rica	Nigeria	2–0	2–0	Friendly
10.	4 July 2023	Red Bull Arena, Harrison, United States	Martinique	1–0	6–4	2023 CONCACAF Gold Cup

== Honours ==
Saprissa

- Liga FPD: Clausura 2014, Clausura 2021
- Costa Rican Cup: 2013

Vancouver Whitecaps

- Canadian Championship: 2015

Individual

- Vancouver Whitecaps FC Player of the Year: 2015, 2017
- MLS Best XI: 2015, 2017
- MLS All-Star: 2016
- CONCACAF Best XI: 2017
