= Marius Røvde =

Norwegian footballer born 1972

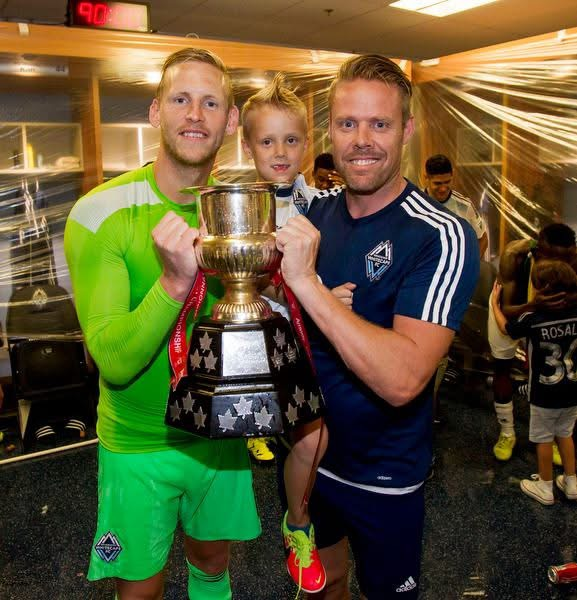
- David Ousted, Marius Rovde, Canadian Championship, Vancouver Whitecaps FC

Personal information
- Full name: Knut Marius Røvde
- Date of birth: 26 June 1972 (age 54)
- Place of birth: Trondheim, Norway
- Height: 6 ft 3 in (1.91 m)
- Position: Goalkeeper

Youth career
- Utleira IF
- Rosenborg BK

Senior career*
Years	Team	Apps	(Gls)
- Stabæk IF
- Hønefoss BK
- Ayr United FC
- Wrexham AFC
- Lillestrøm SK
- Motherwell FC
- Hamkam FK

Managerial career
- Trinidad & Tobago (various roles)
- Vancouver Whitecaps FC (Asst.) MLS
- Minnesota United FC (Asst.) MLS
- Pacific FC (Asst.) CPL
Medal record
Norwegian Champion, Scottish Champion (Runner Up), Trinidadian Champion, Canadian Champion.
- * Club domestic league appearances and goals

Knut Marius Røvde (born 26 June 1972) is a Norwegian football executive, former professional footballer and UEFA A License - qualified goalkeeping coach. His career has spanned more than three decades, progressing from professional player to coach, technical leader and football executive working across Europe, the United States, Canada and the Caribbean.

Rovde began his professional playing career as a goalkeeper, playing for Hønefoss BK, Stabæk Fotball, Hamarkameratene, and Lillestrøm SK in Norway, Ayr United F.C. and Motherwell F.C. in Scotland, and Wrexham A.F.C. in the English football pyramid.

He has since held leadership, technical and executive roles with professional and national teams, including Major League Soccer clubs, the Vancouver Whitecaps and Minnesota United, and national teams, Canada Soccer, Trinidad and Tobago Football Federation, and youth organizations Richmond United FC, Bloomington United FC and Sunnyvale Alliance SC.

== Playing Career ==
During his career as a professional goalkeeper, he played for Hønefoss BK, Stabæk Fotball, Hamarkameratene, and Lillestrøm SK in Norway, Ayr United F.C. and Motherwell F.C. in Scotland, and Wrexham A.F.C. in the English football pyramid.

== Coaching Career ==
Rovde holds a UEFA 'A' goalkeeper "pro-license" and a KNVB Johan Cruyff Masters of Sports Management.

In 2009, Rovde became director of goalkeepers for the Trinidad and Tobago Football Federation Men and Women's program, and also served as Deputy Technical Director for TTFF Women's program. Rovde was a part of the U17 TTFF staff that was ranked No. 1 in CONCACAF, and No. 9 in FIFA World Rankings. His U17 goalkeeper was voted goalkeeper of the tournament in The U17 World Cup 2010 by FIFA. Rovde coached in four World Cup qualifiers for various Trinidad and Tobago teams.

Rovde worked closely alongside coaching legend Even Pellerud as Pellerud's assistant coach and advisor for Team Canada.

In 2011, Rovde became the new head goalkeeper Coach for the Major League Soccer franchise Vancouver Whitecaps FC, working with veteran MLS goalkeepers, Joe Cannon and Jay Nolly, receiving praise for extending Cannon's career as he went on to receive most clean sheets in the MLS 2012 season, and most minutes without conceding goals in the history of the league. Goalkeeper Brad Knighton was added to the 2012 squad and achieved the MLS goalkeeper of the month award and claimed double figures in clean sheets over the course of the season. Rovde's unique goalkeeper coaching style was instrumental in helping the Whitecaps be the first Canadian team to reach the MLS Playoffs.

In 2013, Rovde recruited Danish goalkeeper David Ousted, who later achieved "MLS All-star" status twice. Ousted has said Rovde was the most influential goalkeeper coach in his career and a big part of his success in the MLS. Over three seasons Ousted achieved double figures in clean sheets and Whitecaps FC became the club in MLS with the most shutouts from 2012 to 2016. Ousted still holds the MLS record of minutes without conceding goals, surpassing Cannon.

During his time with the Whitecaps FC, Rovde managed and directed the goalkeeper pathways program for the Youth Academy, producing six Canada national team goalkeepers. Rovde was responsible for discovering goalkeeper Marco Carducci, who achieved "Player of the year" status two consecutive seasons from the Canadian Soccer Association. Carducci captained Canada in the U17 World Cup.

Canadian goalkeeper Simon Thomas, at one time released from Whitecaps FC, was reintroduced to the team by Rovde for two years as a training goalkeeper. Thomas earned a national men's first team game vs the United States Men's National Team in Houston in 2014 and is the only Canadian goalkeeper to have had a shutout vs USA in the last three decades. Simon Thomas went on to be a professional goalkeeper at the highest level in Norway and remains a regular on the Canadian men's national team.

In recent years, Rovde has focused on developing players with pro-series goalkeeper camps with the Whitecaps FC and Minnesota United FC. These popular camps drew goalkeepers from across Canada and the US. Directing the programs while mentoring and supporting young athletes, both male and female, to reach the best versions of themselves has been a focus and commitment from Rovde and many of his graduates have gone on to play for national teams and professional clubs.

After the 2016 season, Rovde was offered a new challenge with the then-new MLS franchise, Minnesota United FC. Rovde worked closely with Minnesota's sports director, Manny Lagos, recruiting goalkeepers to the club, including Sweden national team goalkeeper John Alvbåge, experienced MLS goalkeeper Bobby Shuttleworth, USL goalkeeper of the year Patrick MacLain, and Alex Kapp. Shuttleworth finished off the season as the No. 1 goalkeeper and was voted MNUFC best overall player voted by the fans. Continuing his commitment to youth development, Rovde was heavily involved in the Minnesota United FC's Youth Academy, where he scouted, recruited and trained the first youth US national U15 goalkeeper, Fred Emmings, locally. Rovde's Pro Series goalkeeper camp grew in popularity in Minnesota within a short period, and two academy goalkeepers were recruited out of the participants in those camps.

== Coaching Education & Professional Development ==
Following his executive roles in professional football, Rovde continues to contribute to coach education and technical leadership through ongoing professional development and collaboration with clubs across Europe and North America. He has remained active in the youth football community, mentoring coaches and advising clubs on player development, player pathways, and organizational leadership on a regular basis.

Together with a small group of professional coaches from Houston, Seattle, Dallas and Colorado, Rovde was instrumental in talks and founding an MLS goalkeeper coaches Union in 2017, and MLS and US Soccer's own goalkeeper Pro License program. Rovde suggested a minimum knowledge and experience requirement to become a MLS goalkeeping coach in order to raise standards and professionalism throughout the goalkeeper trade.

== Executive Leadership ==
Rovde transitioned into executive leadership within youth and community football organizations. In 2020, after a short spell as Goalkeeping, Program and Technical Lead at youth club Richmond FC, in Richmond, BC, Rovde was elevated to the role of Executive Director of the club overseeing operations, strategic planning, coach development and community partnerships.

During his tenor Rovde was awarded Association of the Year for Richmond FC, by the Richmond Chamber of Commerce Business Excellence Awards for his work in community outreach, and success in the growth and development of the club. In 2023 he was a finalist as the Business Leader of the year by the Richmond Chamber of Commerce.

As executive director of Richmond FC, Røvde initiated the introduction of girls' teams to the club in 2020, the first time in the organization's history that it had operated girls' teams. The Province reported that the decision to add girls' programming was Røvde's initiative. The new program initially included approximately 45 players across U-17, U-12 and U-11 teams.

During the program's inaugural year, he established an independently administered scholarship fund for female players. The fund committed $250,000 over ten years, with eligible players able to receive $5,000 toward post-secondary education after completing their playing careers with the club and demonstrating community leadership. Røvde described the initiative as supporting the club's objectives of promoting sport, higher education and community support.

In 2024 Rovde became Executive Director with Bloomington United SC in Minnesota, leading the club's strategic direction.

Rovde currently serves as Executive Director and Sporting Director of Sunnyvale Alliance SC in California, leading the club's strategic direction, football operations, and long-term organizational development. His career has increasingly focused on executive leadership, organizational transformation, and player development across professional and community football.

== In Media ==
The only Norwegian to play for Wrexham AFC, Marius Rovde shares a link to Ryan Reynolds, the Deadpool star and co-owner of the club, through Wrexham AFC and Vancouvers Whitecaps FC - Vancouver is Reynolds' hometown and Rovde previously coached at Whitecaps FC.

During the 2026 FIFA World Cup, Rovde was interviewed by several media outlets about Norway's tournament run, player development, and international football. Drawing on his experience working alongside Norway national team head coach Ståle Solbakken, he provided analysis of Norway's football culture, coaching philosophy, and player development system.
