= Octavio Rivero =

Uruguayan footballer (born 1992)

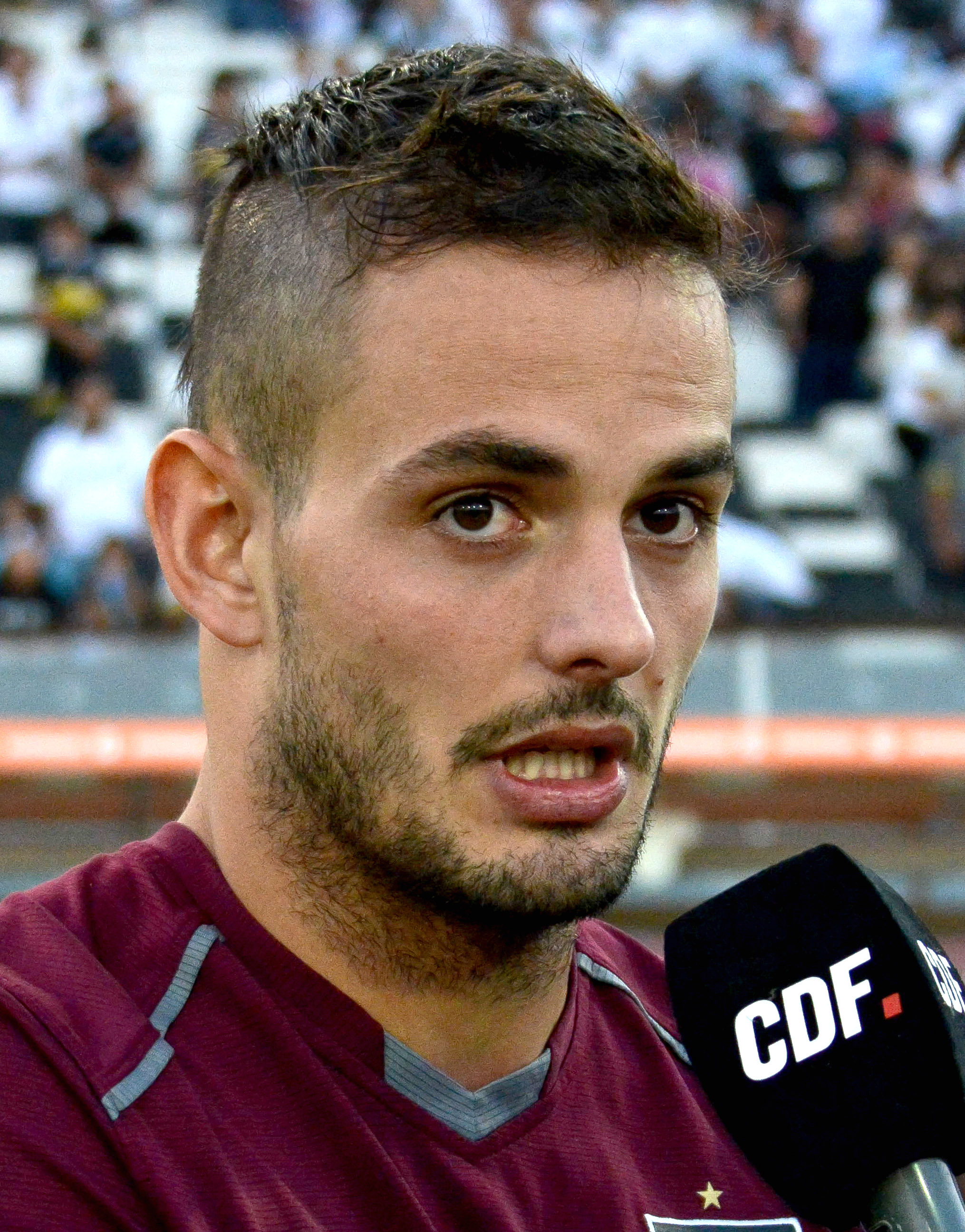
- Rivero with Colo-Colo in 2018

Personal information
- Full name: Raúl Octavio Rivero Falero
- Date of birth: 24 January 1992 (age 34)
- Place of birth: Treinta y Tres, Uruguay
- Height: 1.85 m (6 ft 1 in)
- Position: Striker

Team information
- Current team: Universidad de Chile

Youth career
- Huracán de Treinta y Tres
- Defensor Sporting

Senior career*
Years	Team	Apps	(Gls)
2012–2014	Central Español	19	(3)
2013–2014	→ Rentistas (loan)	17	(10)
2014	O'Higgins	16	(10)
2015–2016	Vancouver Whitecaps	48	(12)
2016–2018	Colo-Colo	46	(19)
2018–2019	Atlas	9	(0)
2019	→ Nacional (loan)	10	(5)
2019–2020	Santos Laguna	32	(6)
2021	Unión La Calera	17	(8)
2022–2023	Unión Española	10	(2)
2023	Racing Montevideo	16	(6)
2024	Defensor Sporting	17	(12)
2024–2025	Barcelona SC	42	(22)
2026–	Universidad de Chile	0	(0)
- * Club domestic league appearances and goals as of 11 January 2026

Raúl Octavio Rivero Falero (born 24 January 1992), known as Octavio Rivero, is a Uruguayan footballer who plays as a striker for Chilean Primera División side Universidad de Chile.

== Career ==
=== Beginnings and Uruguay teams ===
Rivero began his playing career at local club Huracán de Treinta y Tres, where despite being a striker he also played as an attacking midfielder. In 2008, he moved to Montevideo to play for Defensor Sporting and remained on the club's youth program for four years.

He joined Central Español in 2012, where his professional career began, and debuted for the first team in a game against Danubio. In his first season as a professional he played 16 games as a starter and finished the championship with three goals. For the next championship he was transferred to Rentistas and begins the most successful cycle of his career as the top scorer of the club with 10 goals and is one of the principal figures of the team finishing the season as one of the top scorers of the Uruguayan Clausura 2014 helping Rentistas qualify to the Copa Sudamericana 2014.

=== O'Higgins ===
His great performances with Rentistas led him to sign for Chilean Champion O'Higgins in 2014, where he scored 10 goals in 16 matches, being one of the best players of the Chilean championship.

=== Vancouver Whitecaps ===
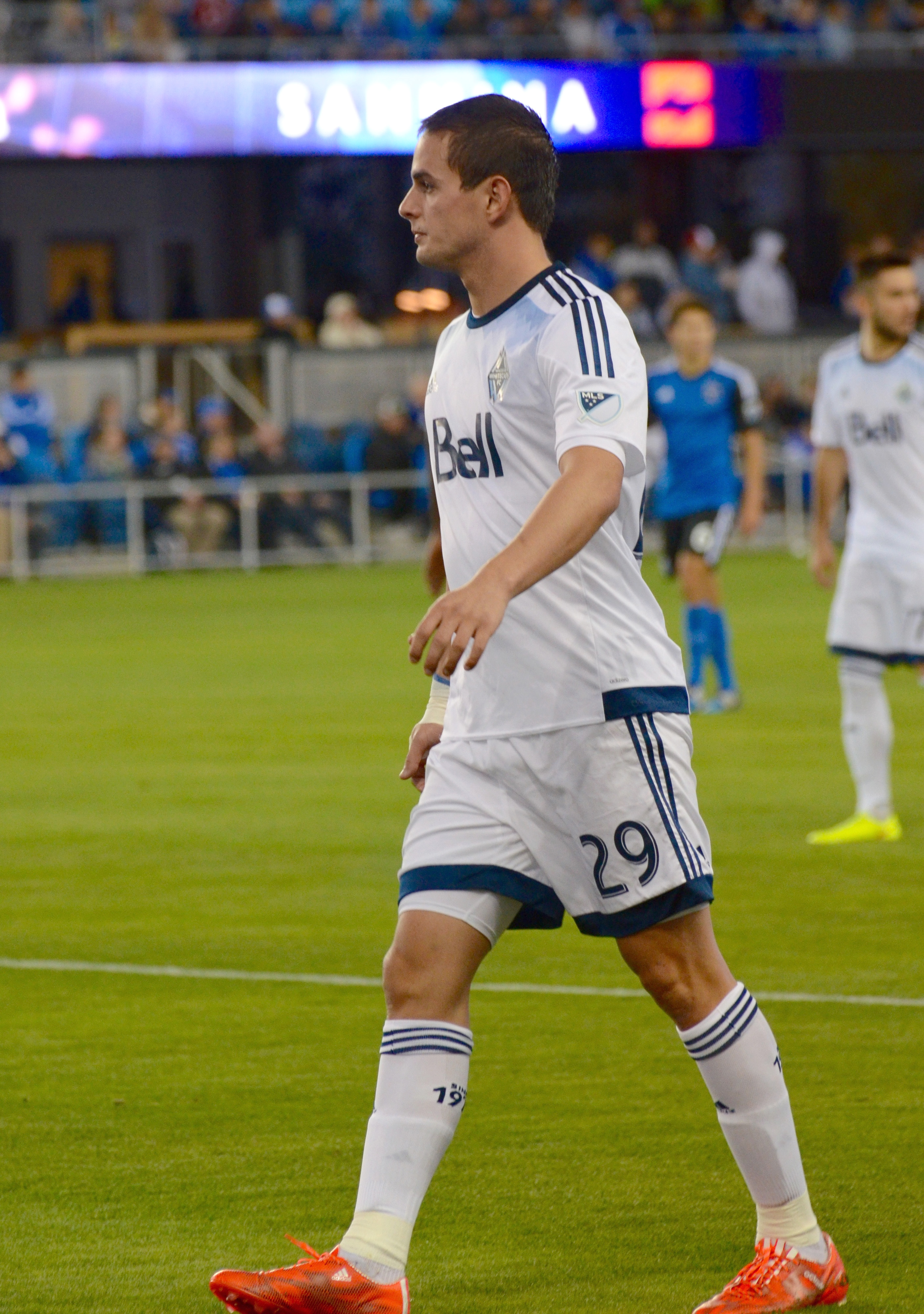
Rivero playing with Vancouver Whitecaps FC

Rivero's success at O'Higgins attracted the interest of Vancouver Whitecaps FC of Major League Soccer who signed Rivero as a young designated player on 25 December 2014. He scored his first goal for the Whitecaps on his debut, against Toronto FC, giving Vancouver a 1–0 lead, but they ended up losing the game 3–1. Rivero followed up on his goal with an 86th-minute winner away at Chicago Fire to earn his team a 1–0 win. Rivero continued his impressive goal scoring form to start his Whitecaps career with his third goal in three games, this time another game winner deep into second half stoppage time away at Orlando City SC, again to earn his team a 1–0 win. After scoring three goals in four games, Rivero was named MLS Player of the Month for the month of March 2015. On 4 April, his fifth game with Vancouver, he temporarily took over the league lead in goals with four goals in five games after scoring his team's second goal in a 2–0 win over the LA Galaxy. After that Rivero scored another goal against the Columbus Crew SC in a 2–2 draw earning him a league-leading five goals in six games for the Whitecaps. On 6 July 2016, Rivero completed a transfer to Colo-Colo on the same day that the Chilean club's coaching staff resigned.

=== Santos Laguna ===
Rivero joined Liga MX team Santos Laguna on a loan in January 2020.

=== Unión Española ===
After being a free agent during 2022, he joined Unión Española for the second half of the 2022 Chilean Primera División.

=== Universidad de Chile ===
On 11 January 2026, Rivero signed a two-year contract with Universidad de Chile.

== Career statistics ==
As of 22 June 2024

Appearances and goals by club, season and competition
Club	Season	League			National Cup		Continental		Other		Total	
Club	Season	Division	Apps	Goals	Apps	Goals	Apps	Goals	Apps	Goals	Apps	Goals
Central Español	2012–13	Uruguayan Primera División	19	3	—		—		—		19	3
Rentistas (loan)	2013–14	Uruguayan Primera División	17	10	—		—		—		17	10
O'Higgins	2014–15	Chilean Primera División	16	10	2	0	—		—		18	10
Vancouver Whitecaps FC	2015	MLS	34	10	1	1	—		2	0	37	11
Vancouver Whitecaps FC	2016	MLS	12	2	3	1	—		—		15	3
Vancouver Whitecaps FC	Total		46	12	4	2	—		2	0	52	14
Colo Colo	2016–17	Chilean Primera División	24	10	7	3	2	0	—		33	13
Colo Colo	2017	Chilean Primera División	10	5	2	0	—		—		12	5
Colo Colo	2018	Chilean Primera División	12	4	—		5	1	—		17	5
Colo Colo	Total		46	19	9	3	7	1	—		62	23
Atlas	2018–19	Liga MX	9	0	2	2	—		—		11	2
Nacional (loan)	2019	Uruguayan Primera División	10	5	—		4	0	—		14	5
Santos Laguna	2019–20	Liga MX	18	3	7	5	—		—		25	8
Santos Laguna	2020–21	Liga MX	14	3	—		—		—		14	3
Santos Laguna	Total		32	6	7	5	—		—		39	11
Unión La Calera	2021	Chilean Primera División	17	8	1	0	2	0	—		20	8
Unión Española	2022	Chilean Primera División	10	2	5	3	—		—		15	5
Racing	2023	Uruguayan Primera División	15	6	—		—		—		15	6
Defensor Sporting	2024	Uruguayan Primera División	17	12	—		2	1	1	0	20	13
Career total			254	93	30	15	15	2	3	0	302	110

== Honours ==
Vancouver Whitecaps

- 2015 Canadian Championship

Colo-Colo

- Primera División: 2017–T
- Copa Chile: 2016
- Supercopa de Chile: 2017, 2018

Club Nacional de Football

- 2019 Supercopa Uruguaya

Defensor Sporting

- 2024 Copa Uruguay
