= Diego Rodríguez (footballer, born 1991) =

Uruguayan footballer

Personal information
- Full name: Diego Martín Rodríguez Telechea
- Date of birth: January 8, 1991 (age 35)
- Place of birth: Montevideo, Uruguay
- Height: 1.86 m (6 ft 1 in)
- Position: Defender

Youth career
- Montevideo Wanderers

Senior career*
Years	Team	Apps	(Gls)
2010−2011	Montevideo Wanderers	5	(0)
2011−2013	Málaga B	42	(5)
2013	Málaga	0	(0)
2014–2016	Juventud	21	(1)
2015	→ Vancouver Whitecaps FC (loan)	4	(0)
2015	→ Whitecaps FC 2 (loan)	7	(0)
2016	Cerro	9	(0)
2016–2017	Universitario	7	(0)
2017	Juventud	11	(2)
2017	Liverpool Montevideo	11	(2)

International career
	Uruguay U20	4	(0)
- * Club domestic league appearances and goals as of 1 April 2018

Diego Martín Rodríguez Telechea (born January 8, 1991) is a Uruguayan footballer who most recently played for Liverpool Montevideo as a defender. He is the older brother of professional striker Leandro Rodríguez.

== Career ==
A product of local Montevideo Wanderers, Diego made his first team debut on April 18, 2010 against Tacuarembó, playing the last fifteen minutes as a substitute for Matías Quagliotti in 2−1 home win. During the summer of 2011, Diego signed for ambitious Málaga CF in Spanish La Liga and was registered for its B-side. In his two seasons with Atlético Malagueño he was a regular starter for the club appearing in 42 matches and scoring 5 goals.

In January 2014, he returned to his country to play for Juventud de Las Piedras. On January 14, 2015 he was transferred on a one-year loan to Vancouver Whitecaps FC. In December 2015, Vancouver announced that Rodriguez had returned to Juventud.
