= Jordan Smith (Costa Rican footballer) =

Costa Rican footballer (born 1991)

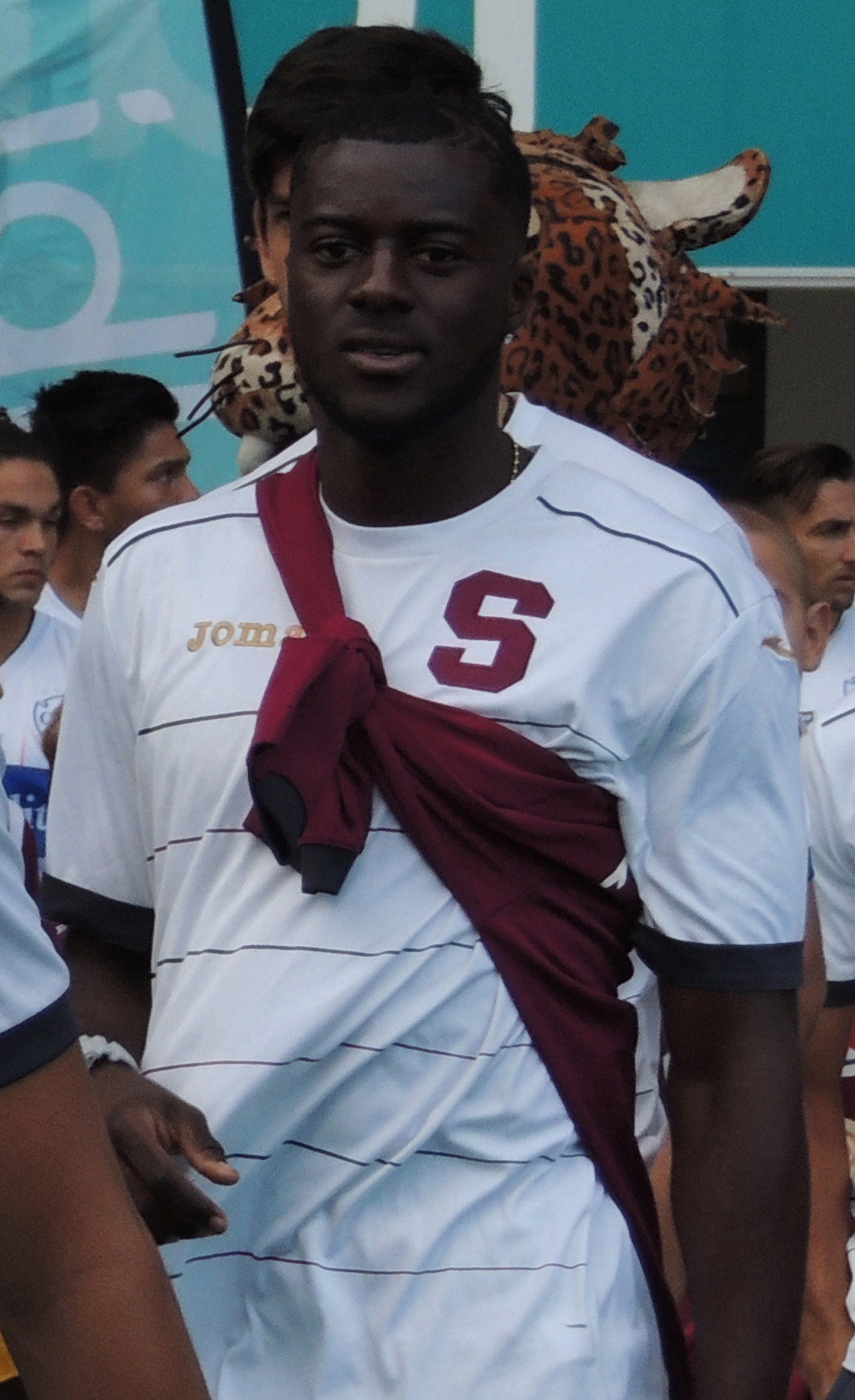
- Smith with Saprissa in 2015

Personal information
- Full name: Jordan Hakeem Smith Wint
- Date of birth: 23 April 1991 (age 35)
- Place of birth: San José, Costa Rica
- Height: 1.86 m (6 ft 1 in)
- Position: Right-back

Team information
- Current team: Cartaginés
- Number: 23

Youth career
- –2010: Saprissa
- 2010–2011: Le Havre
- 2011–2012: Saprissa

Senior career*
Years	Team	Apps	(Gls)
2010–2011	Le Havre B	6	(0)
2012–2019	Saprissa	209	(13)
2015–2016	→ Vancouver Whitecaps (loan)	29	(0)
2019–2020	San Carlos	13	(3)
2020–2022	Iztapa	63	(5)
2022	Mixco	19	(1)
2023–	Cartaginés	28	(0)

International career
2013–2016	Costa Rica	3	(0)
- * Club domestic league appearances and goals as of 17:58, 24 December 2023 (UTC)

Jordan Hakeem Smith Wint (born 23 April 1991) is a Costa Rican professional footballer who plays for Cartaginés.

== Club career ==
=== Saprissa ===
Smith began his career with Saprissa in 2011 playing against San Carlos.

=== Vancouver Whitecaps ===
Smith was loaned to Vancouver Whitecaps FC on 6 August 2015 through to the end of the 2015 MLS season with an option to extend.

== International career ==
Smith was selected in Costa Rica's squad for the 2011 CONCACAF U-20 Championship. He also played for his country at the 2011 FIFA U-20 World Cup. He made his debut for the senior team on 28 May 2013 in a game against Canada, coming on as a sub for Pablo Herrera.
