= David Ousted =

Danish footballer (born 1985)

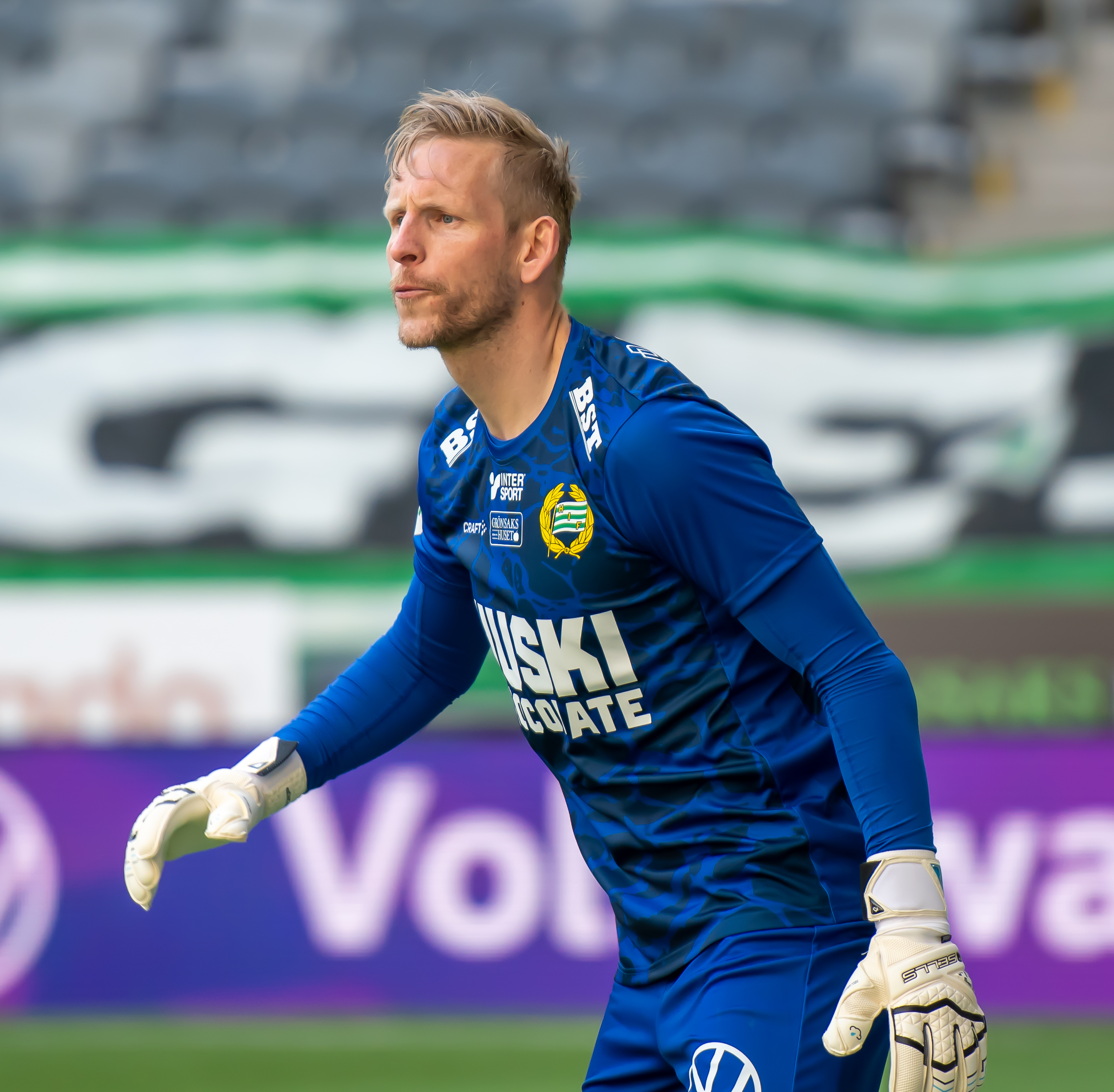
- Ousted in 2021

Personal information
- Full name: David Ousted Hansen
- Date of birth: 1 February 1985 (age 41)
- Place of birth: Roskilde, Denmark
- Height: 1.92 m (6 ft 4 in)
- Position: Goalkeeper

Senior career*
| Years | Team | Apps | (Gls) |
| 2003–2006 | Brøndby | 0 | (0) |
| 2005 | → NFA (loan) | 15 | (0) |
| 2005–2006 | → AB (loan) | 24 | (0) |
| 2006–2007 | HIK | 16 | (0) |
| 2007–2010 | SønderjyskE | 58 | (0) |
| 2010–2013 | Randers | 103 | (0) |
| 2013–2017 | Vancouver Whitecaps FC | 142 | (0) |
| 2018 | D.C. United | 17 | (0) |
| 2019 | Chicago Fire | 14 | (0) |
| 2020–2021 | Hammarby IF | 47 | (0) |
| 2022 | Midtjylland | 11 | (0) |

International career
| 2003 | Denmark U19 | 1 | (0) |
- * Club domestic league appearances and goals

David Ousted Hansen (born 1 February 1985) is a Danish retired professional footballer who played as a goalkeeper. He played with SønderjyskE and Randers in the Danish Superliga, before moving to the Major League Soccer in 2013 where he went on to represent Vancouver Whitecaps, D.C. United and Chicago Fire. At the end of his career, Ousted returned to Europe playing with Hammarby IF in the Swedish Allsvenskan.

== Career ==
=== Denmark ===
Ousted started his career with Brøndby IF, but did not play any senior games for the club. He then played for a number of Danish 1st Division teams, before making his breakthrough with Superliga club SønderjyskE. Ousted was brought to Randers FC in the summer of 2010 for an undisclosed fee in a swap deal with Australian goalkeeper Nathan Coe. In the 2010–2011 UEFA Europa League, Ousted made six appearances for Randers. Ousted led Randers to a third-place finish in the 2012–13 Danish Superliga season which saw the club qualify for the 2013–14 UEFA Europa League. In total, Ousted played 103 matches for Randers and kept 35 clean sheets.

=== Major League Soccer ===
Ousted signed with Vancouver Whitecaps FC of Major League Soccer as a free agent on 20 June 2013. With Vancouver he won the Save of the Week award for Week 3 and Week 16 of the 2014 Major League Soccer season as well as led the league in clean sheets that year. In 2015 Ousted was officially named to the MLS All Star Team and started the second half of a 2–1 victory against English side Tottenham Hotspur. In July 2016, he was included in the roster for the 2016 MLS All-Star Game. He indicated that he planned to leave the club on 1 January 2018, when his contract expired. On 8 January 2018, Ousted signed with MLS side D.C. United, with his former side Vancouver receiving a second-round draft pick in the 2018 MLS SuperDraft.

On 27 January 2019, Ousted was claimed off waivers by the Chicago Fire.

=== Hammarby IF ===
On 20 February 2020, Ousted transferred to the Swedish club Hammarby IF in Allsvenskan. He signed a one-year contract, with an option for a further.

On 30 May 2021, Ousted won the 2020–21 Svenska Cupen, the main domestic cup, with Hammarby through a 5–4 win on penalties (0–0 after full-time) against BK Häcken in the final, where he saved Bénie Traoré's attempt.

On 4 December 2021, he came in as a substitute in a 5–3 home win against Kalmar FF, marking his last appearance for Hammarby. Ousted decided to retire from professional football at the end of the year.

=== Midtjylland ===
Despite announcing his retirement at the end of 2021, it was confirmed on 26 January 2022 that Ousted had signed a deal until the end of the season with Danish Superliga club FC Midtjylland. On 22 May 2022, Midtjylland announced that Ousted was one out of seven players, whose contracts had come to an end and therefore would leave the club. The decision was later changed when the club announced on 24 June that Ousted had signed a new deal for the rest of the year. However, on 31 August 2022, Ousted once again announced his retirement from football.

== Honours ==
Vancouver Whitecaps

- Voyageurs Cup: 2015

Hammarby IF

- Svenska Cupen: 2020–21

Midtjylland

- Danish Cup: 2021–22
